= 2007–08 in Venezuelan football =

The following article presents a summary of the 2007-08 football season in Venezuela, including the top division.

== Torneo Apertura ("Opening" Tournament) ==
Pos	Team	Pld	W	D	L	GF	GA	Pts	GD
1	Caracas F.C.	17	10	7	0	31	10	37	+21
2	Deportivo Anzoátegui	17	10	4	3	31	12	34	+19
3	Deportivo Táchira F.C.	17	7	7	3	22	10	28	+12
3	U.A. Maracaibo	17	7	7	3	26	20	28	+6
5	Zamora F.C.	17	6	7	4	19	11	24	+8
6	Portuguesa F.C.	17	6	6	5	15	18	24	-3
7	Llaneros F.C.	17	6	5	6	25	23	23	+2
8	Aragua F.C.	17	6	5	6	30	30	23	0
9	A.C. Mineros de Guayana	17	6	5	6	28	28	23	0
10	Guaros F.C.	17	7	2	8	28	31	23	-3
11	Trujillanos F.C.	17	6	5	6	22	27	23	-5
12	Monagas S.C.	17	6	4	7	30	26	22	+4
13	Deportivo Italia	17	5	7	5	17	14	22	+3
14	Estudiantes de Mérida F.C.	17	5	5	7	21	28	20	-7
15	Atlético El Vigía F.C.	17	6	1	10	17	26	19	-9
16	Carabobo F.C.	17	4	3	10	13	25	15	-12
17	Unión Lara	17	3	5	9	25	32	14	-7
18	Estrella Roja F.C.	17	3	4	10	19	45	13	-26

== Torneo Clausura ("Closing" Tournament) ==
Pos	Team	Pld	W	D	L	GF	GA	Pts	GD
1	Deportivo Táchira F.C.	17	13	3	1	30	15	42	+15
2	Caracas F.C.	17	10	6	1	34	18	36	+16
3	Deportivo Anzoátegui	17	10	2	5	33	14	32	+19
4	Deportivo Italia	17	7	7	3	23	16	28	+7
5	Guaros F.C.	17	8	4	5	19	14	28	+5
6	U.A. Maracaibo	17	8	3	6	28	22	27	+6
7	Zamora F.C.	17	8	2	7	26	25	26	+1
8	Carabobo F.C.	17	6	6	5	19	16	24	+3
9	Estrella Roja F.C.	17	7	3	7	25	31	24	-6
10	Portuguesa F.C.	17	6	5	6	24	24	23	0
11	Atlético El Vigía F.C.	17	6	1	10	19	25	19	-6
12	Estudiantes de Mérida F.C.	17	4	6	7	18	26	18	-8
13	Llaneros F.C.	17	5	3	9	18	27	18	-9
14	Aragua F.C.	17	4	5	8	18	22	17	-4
15	Monagas S.C.	17	5	2	11	16	26	17	-10
16	A.C. Mineros de Guayana	17	3	7	7	18	23	16	-5
17	Unión Lara	17	3	5	9	18	20	14	-2
18	Trujillanos F.C.	17	3	4	10	18	31	13	-13

== Results ==
The home teams are read down the left hand side while the away teams are indicated along the top.

	ACM	ARA	AEV	CAR	CCS	DAN	DIT	DTÁ	ESR	EdM	GUA	LLA	MON	POR	TRU	UAM	ULR	ZAM
A.C. Mineros de Guayana		0-0	1-0	2-1	1-3	1-0	2-2	2-2	6-0	2-3	0-1	3-0	1-1	3-3	1-5	2-0	3-3	0-0
Aragua F.C.	1-1		2-1	1-1	1-2	1-0	1-0	1-1	3-2	5-2	3-1	3-1	1-2	2-3	2-0	1-1	1-2	2-2
Atlético El Vigía F.C.	3-0	3-1		1-1	0-2	1-5	1-2	1-0	1-0	2-3	0-1	0-0	2-1	2-1	2-0	0-2	2-3	1-0
Carabobo F.C.	0-1	0-2	0-1		1-1	0-1	1-0	0-1	3-1	2-1	1-1	1-0	2-0	0-1	2-0	1-0	0-0	1-2
Caracas F.C.	0-0	2-2	2-0	1-1		0-1	0-0	2-2	6-4	2-1	5-1	0-0	3-0	3-1	3-1	0-0	4-2	3-1
Deportivo Anzoátegui	1-0	5-1	1-0	1-0	2-3		1-1	2-3	7-1	3-0	3-1	2-1	4-0	0-0	4-0	1-1	2-1	5-0
Deportivo Italia	2-3	2-1	1-0	2-0	1-1	2-0		0-0	1-1	2-0	1-1	3-0	2-3	2-0	2-2	1-1	1-0	1-0
Deportivo Táchira F.C.	3-0	3-0	1-0	0-0	0-1	0-0	1-0		6-1	1-0	1-0	3-2	2-1	4-1	2-0	4-3	2-0	0-0
Estrella Roja F.C.	1-0	3-2	0-1	3-2	1-1	1-3	0-0	0-1		4-1	3-2	0-1	1-1	3-3	3-2	2-1	1-4	0-1
Estudiantes de Mérida F.C.	1-1	1-1	1-0	2-0	1-2	1-1	2-0	0-1	1-1		2-1	1-0	2-1	2-2	1-0	0-0	2-2	2-2
Guaros F.C.	3-1	1-0	1-0	3-1	0-0	0-1	1-1	1-0	3-1	1-1		4-3	2-2	1-0	4-1	2-1	2-1	0-3
Llaneros F.C.	3-2	0-2	2-1	3-1	1-2	1-0	1-0	1-1	5-1	0-0	3-2		2-1	1-0	1-1	3-6	2-0	1-1
Monagas S.C.	1-1	1-0	4-1	4-0	1-0	2-3	0-1	0-1	1-0	5-0	0-1	1-0		0-1	0-1	0-2	2-1	2-0
Portuguesa F.C.	0-3	1-0	2-3	0-0	1-1	1-0	1-0	2-2	1-2	0-0	1-0	1-0	2-1		2-1	1-1	4-0	2-1
Trujillanos F.C.	2-1	0-0	3-2	2-3	1-1	1-1	1-1	1-2	0-0	1-0	4-3	2-1	1-1	2-0		1-1	2-0	1-4
Unión Atlético Maracaibo	2-1	1-1	3-1	2-3	1-2	1-0	0-0	0-1	4-0	4-2	2-1	3-2	3-3	1-0	2-1		2-1	2-0
Unión Lara	1-1	6-4	2-3	1-1	0-2	0-3	4-4	0-0	1-2	2-1	0-1	1-1	1-3	1-1	3-0	0-1		0-0
Zamora F.C.	2-0	1-0	3-1	1-2	0-2	0-1	0-2	2-0	0-1	3-2	2-1	1-1	4-1	0-0	3-0	4-0	2-0	

Last updated: May 25, 2008
Source: Apertura 2007 Fixture
Clausura 2008 Fixture
Fixtures in green represent games played during the Apertura 2007 tournament, fixtures in red represent those played during the Clausura 2008.

== Aggregate Table ==
Pos	Team	Pld	W	D	L	GF	GA	Pts	GD	Qualification or relegation
1	Caracas F.C.	34	20	13	1	65	29	73	+36	2009 Copa Libertadores Second Stage
2	Deportivo Táchira F.C.	34	20	10	4	52	25	70	+27	2009 Copa Libertadores Second Stage
3	Deportivo Anzoátegui	34	20	6	8	64	26	66	+38	2009 Copa Libertadores First Stage
4	U.A. Maracaibo	34	15	10	9	54	42	55	+12	2008 Copa Sudamericana Preliminary
5	Guaros F.C.	34	15	6	13	47	47	51	0	
6	Deportivo Italia	34	12	14	8	40	30	50	+10	
7	Zamora F.C.	34	14	8	12	45	37	50	+8	
8	Portuguesa F.C.	34	12	11	11	39	42	47	-3	
9	Llaneros F.C.	34	11	8	15	43	50	41	-7	
10	Aragua F.C.	34	10	10	14	48	52	40	-4	2008 Copa Sudamericana First Stage^{1}
11	A.C. Mineros de Guayana	34	9	12	13	46	50	39	-4	
12	Monagas S.C.	34	11	6	17	46	52	39	-6	
13	Carabobo F.C.	34	10	9	15	32	41	39	-9	
14	Atlético El Vigía F.C.	34	12	2	20	37	51	38	-14	
15	Estudiantes de Mérida F.C.	34	9	11	14	39	54	38	-15	
16	Estrella Roja F.C.	34	10	7	17	44	76	37	-32	
17	Unión Lara	34	9	9	16	40	58	36	-18	Relegated
18	Trujillanos F.C.	34	6	10	18	43	62	28	-19	Relegated

Last updated: May 25, 2008
Source: FVF
^{1} Winner of 2007–08 Copa Venezuela
Pos = Position; Pld = Matches played; W = Matches won; D = Matches drawn; L = Matches lost; GF = Goals for; GA = Goals against; GD = Goal difference; Pts = Points.

== "Championship" playoff ==
Caracas F.C. and Deportivo Táchira F.C. ended with one championship each at the end of the Apertura and Clausura. Tournament rules establish that a playoff game is required. Deportivo Táchira won on away goal.

May 28, 2008

Caracas F.C.	1 – 1	Deportivo Táchira
Juan David Valencia 80'		Javier Villafraz 85'

Estadio Olímpico de la UCV, Caracas
Attendance: 18 000
Referee: José Argote

May 31, 2008

Deportivo Táchira	0 – 0	Caracas F.C.

Polideportivo de Pueblo Nuevo, San Cristóbal
Attendance: 38 000
Referee: Giovanny Perluzzo

Primera División Venezolana 2007-08 Winners
Deportivo Táchira F.C.
6th Title

== Venezuela national team ==
This section will cover Venezuela's games from the end of the Copa América 2007 until June 19, 2008.

Date	Venue	Opponents	Score	Comp	Venezuela scorers	Match Report(s)
August 22, 2007	Estadio Antonio Oddone Sarubbi; Ciudad del Este, Paraguay	Paraguay	1 - 1	F	Miku 57'	CONMEBOL
September 8, 2007	Estadio Polideportivo Cachamay; Puerto Ordaz, Venezuela	Paraguay	3 - 2	F	D. Arismendi 66'; G. Maldonado 75'; A. Guerra 90'	CONMEBOL
September 12, 2007	Estadio Olímpico Luis Ramos; Puerto La Cruz, Venezuela	Panama	1 - 1	F	G. Maldonado 90+5' (pen)	CONMEBOL
October 13, 2007	Estadio Olímpico Atahualpa; Quito, Ecuador	Ecuador	0 - 1	WCQ2010	J. M. Rey 67'	CONMEBOL
October 16, 2007	Estadio José Pachencho Romero; Maracaibo, Venezuela	Argentina	0 - 2	WCQ2010		CONMEBOL
November 17, 2007	Estadio El Campín; Bogotá, Colombia	Colombia	1 - 0	WCQ2010		CONMEBOL
November 20, 2007	Estadio Polideportivo de Pueblo Nuevo; San Cristóbal, Venezuela	Bolivia	5 - 3	WCQ2010	D. Arismendi 21' 40'; A. Guerra 82'; G. Maldonado 89' 90+2'	CONMEBOL
February 3, 2008	Estadio Monumental de Maturín; Maturín, Venezuela	Haiti	1 - 0	F	J. Rojas 10'	CONMEBOL
February 6, 2008	Estadio José Antonio Anzoátegui; Puerto La Cruz, Venezuela	Haiti	1 - 1	F	A. Rondón 31'	CONMEBOL
March 23, 2008	Estadio Polideportivo Cachamay; Puerto Ordaz, Venezuela	El Salvador	1 - 0	F	J.S. Rondón 33'	FVF
March 26, 2008	Estadio José A. Anzoátegui; Puerto La Cruz, Venezuela	Bolivia	0 - 1	F		CONMEBOL
April 30, 2008	Estadio Alfonso Lopez; Bucaramanga, Colombia	Colombia	5 - 2	F	G. Cichero 11'; F. Lucena 44'	CONMEBOL
May 30, 2008	Lockhart Stadium; Fort Lauderdale, Florida, United States	Honduras	1 - 1	F	G. Maldonado 78'	FVF
June 6, 2008	Gillette Stadium; Foxborough, Massachusetts, United States	Brazil	0 - 2	F	G. Maldonado 5'; R. Vargas 43'	CONMEBOL
June 9, 2008	Stadion Ergilio Hato; Willemstad, Netherlands Antilles	Netherlands Antilles	0 - 1	F	D. Arismendi 70'	FVF
June 14, 2008	Estadio Centenario; Montevideo, Uruguay	Uruguay	1 - 1	WCQ2010	R. Vargas 56'	CONMEBOL
June 19, 2008	Olímpico Luis Ramos; Puerto la Cruz, Venezuela	Chile	2 - 3	WCQ2010	G. Maldonado 59'; J. Arango 80'	CONMEBOL

KEY:

  - F = Friendly match
  - WCQ2010 = 2010 FIFA World Cup qualification
