= 2008–09 Venezuelan Primera División season =

Copa CANTV
- Season: 2008–09
- Champions: Caracas (10th title)
- Relegated: Minervén; Unión Atlético Maracaibo; Portuguesa; Estrella Roja
- Copa Libertadores: Caracas; Deportivo Italia; Deportivo Táchira
- Copa Sudamericana: Zamora
- Matches played: 308
- Goals scored: 773 (2.51 per match)
- Top goalscorer: Heatklif Castillo (17 goals)
- Biggest home win: Deportivo Táchira 9–2 Portuguesa
- Biggest away win: Mineros 1–5 Deportivo Táchira
- Highest scoring: Deportivo Táchira 9–2 Portuguesa

The 2008–09 Primera División season (officially the 2008–09 Copa CANTV for sponsorship reasons) is the 27th professional season of Venezuela's top-flight football league.

== Teams ==
Locations of the 2008-09 Primera División teams
- Aragua
- Carabobo
- Caracas
- Deportivo Anzoátegui
- Deportivo Italia
- Deportivo Táchira
- El Vigía
- Estrella Roja
- Estudiantes
- Guaros FC
- Llaneros
- Mineros
- Minervén
- Monagas
- Portuguesa
- Unión Atlético Maracaibo
- Zamora
- Zulia

== Torneo Apertura ==
=== Standings ===
Pos	Team	Pld	W	D	L	GF	GA	GD	Pts	Qualification
1	Deportivo Italia	17	10	6	1	22	11	+11	36	Serie Final and the 2010 Copa Libertadores Second Stage
2	Monagas	17	9	4	4	23	15	+8	31	
3	Caracas	17	9	3	5	29	20	+9	30	
4	Zulia	17	9	3	5	27	21	+6	30	
5	Deportivo Anzoátegui	17	8	5	4	23	15	+8	29	
6	Deportivo Táchira	17	7	7	3	35	18	+17	28	
7	Zamora	17	8	3	6	22	17	+5	27	
8	Llaneros	17	7	4	6	15	18	−3	25	
9	Aragua	17	7	3	7	21	21	0	24	
10	Minervén	17	7	2	8	24	24	0	23	
11	Atlético El Vigía	17	5	7	5	21	21	0	22	
12	Mineros de Guayana	17	6	3	8	18	24	−6	21	
13	Unión Atlético Maracaibo	17	6	2	9	22	25	−3	20	
14	Carabobo	17	5	5	7	19	24	−5	20	
15	Estudiantes de Mérida	17	6	1	10	22	28	−6	19	
16	Estrella Roja	17	3	6	8	15	23	−8	15	
17	Portuguesa	17	3	3	11	15	36	−21	12	
18	Guaros	17	1	7	9	13	25	−12	10	

Updated to match(es) played on December 17, 2008. Source: RSSSF
Rules for classification: 1) points; 2) goal difference; 3) number of goals scored.

=== Results ===
Home \ Away	ARA	ATV	CBO	CRC	DAN	DIT	DTA	ER	EME	GUA	LLA	MGU	MIN	MON	POR	MAR	ZAM	ZUL
Aragua						0–2	0–0	1–0	4–1	1–0		2–0		2–3				1–1
El Vigía	1–0		0–2	2–2	1–0						3–1		2–2		2–0	2–2	2–2	
Carabobo	1–3			2–4		2–2	1–1		3–1	1–0				2–1			1–1	1–0
Caracas	2–1					0–1	0–0		3–0	1–1				0–2			2–0	0–2
Deportivo Anzoátegui	1–1		1–0	3–1		4–0	2–4		2–0	3–1				0–0			2–1	
Deportivo Italia		2–0					1–0	1–1	1–0		1–0	2–0			1–1	1–0		2–2
Deportivo Táchira		1–1						3–2			1–1	0–1	4–0		9–2	0–1		5–2
Estrella Roja		1–1	1–1	0–2	0–0						1–2	2–1	1–0		2–2	1–0		
Estudiantes		2–1					1–3	1–0			0–1	3–0			4–1	3–1		2–2
Guaros FC		1–1				0–0	2–2	3–3	1–3			1–1			1–0			0–1
Llaneros	2–0		1–1	1–4	0–1					0–0			2–1	1–0			0–1	
Mineros		1–0	3–0	1–2	1–1						1–1		2–1		2–1	3–1		
Minervén	2–0		2–0	1–2	1–1	1–3			2–1	2–0				3–1			3–0	
Monagas		1–0				0–0	1–1	2–0	1–0	2–1		1–0						2–0
Portuguesa	2–1		1–0	0–3	1–0						0–1		0–2	1–2		1–1	1–2	
Unión Atlético Maracaibo	2–3		2–1	2–1	1–2					2–1	0–1		3–0	3–2			0–1	
Zamora	1–2					0–1	0–1	2–0	2–0	2–0		3–0		2–2				2–0
Zulia		1–2			2–0			1–0			3–0	3–1	2–1		3–1	2–1		

Updated to match(es) played on December 17, 2008. Source: RSSSF
Legend: Blue = home team win; Yellow = draw; Red = away team win.

== Torneo Clausura ==
=== Standings ===
Pos	Team	Pld	W	D	L	GF	GA	GD	Pts	Qualification
1	Caracas	17	11	4	2	32	15	+17	37	Serie Final and the 2010 Copa Libertadores Second Stage
2	Deportivo Táchira	17	10	6	1	29	15	+14	36	
3	Estudiantes de Mérida	17	10	3	4	27	18	+9	33	
4	Zamora	17	8	7	2	29	19	+10	31	
5	Guaros	17	9	3	5	19	18	+1	30	
6	Llaneros	17	7	6	4	20	17	+3	27	
7	Mineros de Guayana	17	7	3	7	18	19	−1	24	
8	Zulia	17	6	5	6	24	22	+2	23	
9	Deportivo Italia	17	4	8	5	22	19	+3	20	
10	Portuguesa	17	5	5	7	18	21	−3	20	
11	Monagas	17	4	7	6	19	21	−2	19	
12	Deportivo Anzoátegui	17	4	6	7	21	20	+1	18	
13	Minervén	17	4	6	7	17	25	−8	18	
14	Estrella Roja	17	4	5	8	17	26	−9	17	
15	Atlético El Vigía	17	3	6	8	18	25	−7	15	
16	Unión Atlético Maracaibo	17	4	3	10	18	26	−8	15	
17	Aragua	17	2	8	7	15	22	−7	14	
18	Carabobo	17	3	5	9	17	31	−14	14	

Updated to match(es) played on May 17, 2009. Source: RSSSF
Rules for classification: 1) points; 2) goal difference; 3) number of goals scored.

=== Results ===
Home \ Away	ARA	ATV	CBO	CRC	DAN	DIT	DTA	ER	EME	GUA	LLA	MGU	MIN	MON	POR	MAR	ZAM	ZUL
Aragua		2–0	1–1	1–2	1–1						1–2		0–0		1–0	2–2	0–0	
El Vigía						2–2	1–0	2–1	0–1	2–0		0–1		2–3				1–3
Carabobo		1–1			2–1			1–2			1–1	1–0	1–2		1–0	0–3		
Caracas		2–1	3–1		3–1			3–2			2–0	0–0	3–1		2–1	3–0		
Deportivo Anzoátegui		1–1						5–1			0–0	0–2	0–0		4–0	2–0		1–0
Deportivo Italia	1–1		2–0	0–0	1–1					1–2			2–2	2–0			1–1	
Deportivo Táchira	2–1		2–0	0–0	3–2	1–0			3–3	2–0				1–0			1–1	
Estrella Roja	1–0					1–4	1–1		1–2	1–1				1–1			0–0	2–0
Estudiantes	2–0		2–1	2–1	2–1	1–0				0–1			3–0	1–0			1–3	
Guaros FC	1–1		3–1	1–4	2–1						1–0		2–1	3–2		1–0	0–1	
Llaneros		1–1				1–1	2–3	1–0	3–2			1–0			2–1	3–1		1–1
Mineros	3–1					2–1	1–5	0–1	2–2	0–1				1–0			2–3	1–0
Minervén		1–1					0–1	2–1			0–1	2–1			2–1	0–1		1–4
Monagas	0–0		3–3	1–1	2–0						2–1		1–1		0–0	0–1	3–2	
Portuguesa		1–1				1–0	1–1	2–0	1–0	0–0		1–1						3–0
Unión Atlético Maracaibo		2–1				2–2	0–1	1–1	1–2			0–1			1–2			1–2
Zamora		3–1	3–0	1–3	0–0						0–0		2–2		5–3	3–2		
Zulia	4–2		2–2	2–0		1–2	2–2		1–1	1–0				1–1			0–1	

Updated to match(es) played on May 17, 2009. Source: RSSSF
Legend: Blue = home team win; Yellow = draw; Red = away team win.

== Aggregate table ==
Pos	Team	Pld	W	D	L	GF	GA	GD	Pts	Qualification or relegation
1	Caracas	34	20	7	7	61	35	+26	67	
2	Deportivo Táchira	34	17	13	4	64	33	+31	64	2010 Copa Libertadores First Stage
3	Zamora	34	16	10	8	51	36	+15	58	2009 Copa Sudamericana First Stage
4	Deportivo Italia	34	14	14	6	44	30	+14	56	
5	Zulia	34	15	8	11	51	43	+8	53	
6	Estudiantes de Mérida	34	16	4	14	49	46	+3	52	
7	Monagas	34	13	11	10	42	37	+5	50	
8	Llaneros	34	14	10	10	35	35	0	52	
9	Deportivo Anzoátegui	34	12	11	11	44	35	+9	47	2009 Copa Sudamericana First Stage (Note: As 2008 Copa Venezuela champion.)
10	Mineros de Guayana	34	13	6	15	36	43	−7	45	
11	Minervén	34	11	8	15	41	49	−8	41	Relegated to the Segunda División (Note: Minervén was relegated because they had forfeited their U-17 and U-20 teams.)
12	Guaros	34	10	10	14	32	43	−11	40	
13	Aragua	34	9	11	14	36	43	−7	38	
14	Atlético El Vigía	34	8	13	13	39	46	−7	37	
15	Unión Atlético Maracaibo	34	10	5	19	40	51	−11	35	Relegated to the Segunda División (Note: Unión Atlético Maracaibo was relegated due to financial reasons.)
16	Carabobo	34	8	10	16	36	55	−19	34	
17	Estrella Roja	34	7	11	16	32	49	−17	32	Relegated to the Segunda División
18	Portuguesa	34	8	8	18	33	57	−24	32	Relegated to the Segunda División

Updated to match(es) played on May 17, 2009. Source: RSSSF
Rules for classification: 1) points; 2) goal difference; 3) number of goals scored.

== Top goalscorers ==
Pos	Player	Club	Goals
1	(Venezuela) Heatklif Castillo	Aragua	17
2	(Venezuela) Daniel Arismendi	Maracaibo; Deportivo Táchira	11; 5
3	(Venezuela) Armando Maita	Monagas	15
3	(Venezuela) Juan Enrique García	Zamora	15
5	(Venezuela) Alexander Rondón	Deportivo Anzoátegui	13
5	(Venezuela) Andrés Buelvas	El Vigía	13
5	(Venezuela) Leandro Vargas	Minervén; Mineros	11; 2

== Serie Final ==
Caracas F.C. and Deportivo Italia ended with one championship each at the end of the Apertura and Clausura. Tournament rules establish that a playoff game is required. Caracas F.C. won by an aggregate score of 6-1.

May 23, 2009

Caracas	1 – 1	Deportivo Italia
Rentería 56'		Cásseres 50'

Estadio Olímpico de la UCV, Caracas
Referee: Mayker Gómez

May 31, 2009

Deportivo Italia	0 – 5	Caracas
		Lucena 8'; Castellín 12'; Guerra 26'; Valoyes 61'; Rey 77'

Estadio Olímpico de la UCV, Caracas
Referee: Juan Soto

Copa CANTV
2008-09 winners
Caracas
10th title

== See also ==
- 2008–09 in Venezuelan football
