= Darío Figueroa =

Argentine-born Venezuelan footballer (born 1978)

Personal information
- Full name: Darío Damián Figueroa Lissa
- Date of birth: 13 February 1978 (age 48)
- Place of birth: San Rafael, Argentina
- Height: 1.79 m (5 ft 10 in)
- Position: Attacking midfielder

Youth career
- 1991–1995: River Plate

Senior career*
| Years | Team | Apps | (Gls) |
| 1996–1998 | River Plate | 5 | (1) |
| 1996 | Yokohama Marinos | 1 | (0) |
| 1999–2000 | Quilmes | 16 | (2) |
| 2000–2001 | Aldosivi | 8 | (0) |
| 2002 | Ferro Carril Oeste | 5 | (0) |
| 2003–2008 | Maracaibo | 154 | (26) |
| 2004 | → Quindío (loan) | 16 | (4) |
| 2009–2010 | Caracas | 40 | (10) |
| 2010–2011 | Deportivo La Guaira | 17 | (5) |
| 2011–2013 | Zamora | 54 | (8) |

International career^{‡}
| 1997 | Argentina U20 | 1 | (0) |
Medal record
Men's football
Representing Argentina
FIFA U-20 World Cup
| Winner | 1997 Malaysia |
South American U-20 Championship
| Winner | 1997 Chile |
- * Club domestic league appearances and goals as of 16 September 2015 ‡ National team caps and goals as of 16 September 2015

Darío Damián Figueroa Lissa (born 13 February 1978), better known as Darío Figueroa (Spanish pronunciation: [daˈɾi.o fiɣeˈɾo.a]), is a retired professional footballer who plays as a attacking midfield. Born in Argentina, he acquired his Venezuelan passport in January 2007.

== Club career ==
Figueroa began his playing career in 1996 with River Plate. After only four appearances in the Primera División Argentina he joined Quilmes of the 2nd division, he also played for Aldosivi and Ferro Carril Oeste in the lower leagues of Argentine football.

In 2003, Figueroa resurrected his playing career in Venezuela. He played for UA Maracaibo between 2003 and 2008, also Darío Figueroa is one of the historics goalscorers of Maracaibo with 26 goals, after of Daniel Arismendi (31 goals), Cristian Cásseres (34 goals) and Guillermo Beraza (38).

In 2009, he joined Caracas FC where he scored a number of goals to help the club win their group and qualify for the knockout stages of Copa Libertadores 2009. Darío Figueroa currently is one of idols of Caracas.

== Club statistics ==
| Club | Season | League | | Cup | | League Cup | | Continental^{1} | | Total | |
| Club | Season | Apps | Goals | Apps | Goals | Apps | Goals | Apps | Goals | Apps | Goals |
|---|---|---|---|---|---|---|---|---|---|---|---|
| Yokohama Marinos | 1996 | 1 | 0 | 0 | 0 | 0 | 0 | 0 | 0 | 0 | 0 |
| Yokohama Marinos | Total | 1 | 0 | 0 | 0 | 0 | 0 | 0 | 0 | 0 | 0 |
| River Plate | 1997–98 | 5 | 1 | – | | – | | 0 | 0 | 5 | 1 |
| River Plate | Total | 5 | 1 | – | | – | | 0 | 0 | 5 | 1 |
| Quilmes | 1998–99 | 16 | 2 | – | | – | | – | | 16 | 2 |
| Quilmes | Total | 16 | 2 | – | | – | | – | | 16 | 2 |
| Aldosivi | 1999–00 | 8 | 0 | – | | – | | – | | 8 | 0 |
| Aldosivi | Total | 8 | 0 | – | | – | | – | | 8 | 0 |
| Ferro Carril Oeste | 2002–03 | 5 | 0 | – | | – | | – | | 5 | 0 |
| Ferro Carril Oeste | Total | 5 | 0 | – | | – | | – | | 5 | 0 |
| UA Maracaibo | 2003–04 | 24 | 6 | – | | – | | 4 | 0 | 28 | 6 |
| UA Maracaibo | 2004–05 | 26 | 4 | – | | – | | – | | 26 | 4 |
| UA Maracaibo | 2005–06 | 28 | 5 | – | | – | | 4 | 0 | 32 | 5 |
| UA Maracaibo | 2006–07 | 32 | 5 | – | | – | | – | | 32 | 5 |
| UA Maracaibo | 2007–08 | 30 | 3 | 3 | 0 | – | | 4 | 0 | 34 | 3 |
| UA Maracaibo | 2008–09 | 14 | 3 | 2 | 0 | – | | 2 | 1 | 16 | 4 |
| UA Maracaibo | Total | 154 | 26 | 5 | 0 | – | | 14 | 1 | 173 | 27 |
| → Quindío (loan) | 2004 | 16 | 4 | – | | – | | – | | 16 | 4 |
| → Quindío (loan) | Total | 16 | 4 | – | | – | | – | | 16 | 4 |
| Caracas | 2008–09 | 21 | 2 | 0 | 0 | – | | 10 | 5 | 31 | 7 |
| Caracas | 2009–10 | 19 | 8 | 7 | 1 | – | | 6 | 0 | 32 | 9 |
| Caracas | Total | 40 | 10 | 7 | 1 | – | | 16 | 5 | 63 | 16 |
| La Guaira | 2010–11 | 17 | 5 | 2 | 0 | – | | – | | 19 | 5 |
| La Guaira | Total | 17 | 5 | 2 | 0 | – | | – | | 19 | 5 |
| Zamora | 2011–12 | 24 | 4 | 5 | 0 | – | | 4 | 0 | 33 | 4 |
| Zamora | 2012–13 | 30 | 4 | 2 | 0 | – | | – | | 32 | 4 |
| Zamora | Total | 54 | 8 | 7 | 0 | – | | 4 | 0 | 65 | 8 |
| Career Total | | 316 | 56 | 21 | 1 | 0 | 0 | 38 | 6 | 383 | 63 |

== Honours ==
=== Club ===
River Plate

- Torneo Apertura: 1996, 1997
- Copa Libertadores: 1996
- Supercopa Sudamericana: 1997

Maracaibo

- Venezuelan Primera División: 2004–05

Caracas

- Venezuelan Primera División (2): 2008–09, 2009–10
- Copa Venezuela: 2009

Zamora

- Venezuelan Primera División: 2012-13, 2009–10

Argentina U20

- South American Youth Championship: 1997
- FIFA World Youth Championship: 1997
