= Alejandro Guerra =

Venezuelan footballer (born 1985)

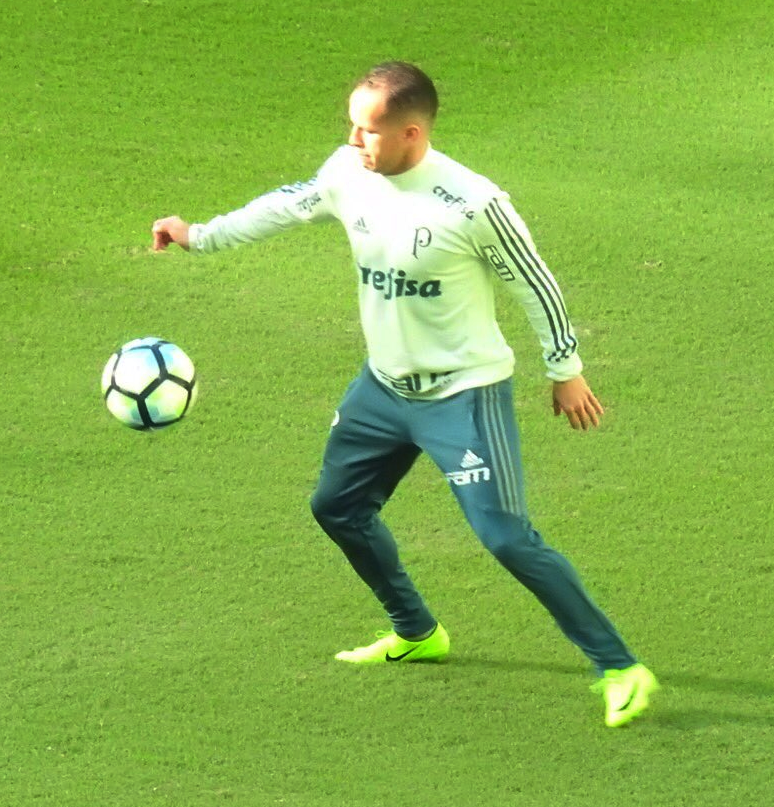
- Guerra training with Palmeiras in 2017

Personal information
- Full name: Alejandro Abraham Guerra Morales
- Date of birth: 9 July 1985 (age 41)
- Place of birth: Caracas, Venezuela
- Height: 1.72 m (5 ft 8 in)
- Position: Attacking midfielder

Youth career
- 2002–2004: Caracas

Senior career*
Years	Team	Apps	(Gls)
2003–2010	Caracas	128	(23)
2004–2005	→ Juventud Antoniana (loan)	0	(0)
2010–2011	Deportivo Anzoátegui	33	(16)
2011–2015	Mineros de Guayana	94	(18)
2014	→ Atletico Nacional (loan)	7	(0)
2015–2016	Atletico Nacional	67	(15)
2017–2020	Palmeiras	46	(7)
2019	→ Bahia (loan)	17	(1)
2021	Delfines del Este	0	(0)

International career
2005	Venezuela U20	8	(0)
2006–2017	Venezuela	59	(3)
- * Club domestic league appearances and goals

Alejandro Abraham Guerra Morales (born 9 July 1985) is a Venezuelan former professional footballer who played as an attacking midfielder.

== Club career ==
=== Caracas ===
Born in Caracas, Guerra started his senior career at hometown club Caracas FC, making his senior debut in 2003 and appearing in four matches during the campaign. He scored his first professional goal on 21 September 2003, in a 6–0 routing of Monagas.

In 2004 Guerra was loaned to Primera B Nacional club Juventud Antoniana, for one year. After failing to make a single appearance at the club, he returned to Caracas in the following year and subsequently established himself as a starter. He scored his first goal in the Copa Libertadores on 22 February 2007, netting the game's only in a home success over L.D.U. Quito.

On 1 July 2010, Guerra announced his departure from the club after having "economical disputes with the club's board".

=== Deportivo Anzoátegui ===
On 20 July 2010, Guerra signed a one-year contract with fellow top tier club Deportivo Anzoátegui. He made his debut for the club on 8 August, starting and scoring his team's second in a 2–2 home draw against Deportivo Petare.

Guerra scored his first professional hat-trick on 3 April 2011, in a 4–2 away win against Estudiantes de Mérida. He repeated the feat late in the month, in a 10–0 home thrashing of Atlético Venezuela. He finished his first and only season at the club with 16 goals, also scoring once in 2011 Copa Sudamericana.

=== Mineros de Guayana ===
In July 2011 Guerra joined Mineros de Guayana. He scored his first goals for the club on 25 September 2011, netting a brace in a 2–1 home win against Llaneros de Guanare.

Guerra was a regular starter for Mineros in the following campaigns, as his side finished second in 2013–14. He also played a key role in 2012 Copa Sudamericana, scoring three goals in only four games as his side became the first Venezuelan club to win an away match in the competition.

=== Atlético Nacional ===
On 30 June 2014 Guerra moved abroad for the first time in his career, after agreeing to a one-year loan deal at Atlético Nacional. On 5 July of the following year he was bought outright, with Mineros retaining 30% of his federative rights.

Guerra featured regularly in the following seasons, and was an important unit in the club's Libertadores winning campaign by playing in 13 matches and scoring three goals; two of them, in a 4–2 home win against Huracán on 3 May 2016, granted their qualification to the quarterfinals. By winning the tournament, he became the first Venezuelan to lift the trophy.

=== Palmeiras ===
On 27 December 2016, Brazilian club Palmeiras announced Guerra signed a three-year contract, starting in January 2017. With help from sponsors Crefisa, the club paid US$ 3.7 million for the player.

==== Bahia (loan) ====
On 5 July 2019, Palmeiras reached an agreement for Alejandro Guerra to join Bahia on loan until the end of the season.

== International career ==
After representing Venezuela at under-20 level in 2005 South American U-20 Championship, Guerra made his debut for the main squad on 5 May 2006, coming on as a second half substitute for Jorge Rojas in a 1–0 loss against Mexico at the Rose Bowl in Pasadena, California. He scored his first full international goal the following 14 January, netting the first in a 2–0 friendly win against Sweden.

Guerra was also called up for 2007 and 2015 Copa América, aside from Copa América Centenario. He made his debut in the competition on 26 June 2007 in a 1–0 win against Bolivia.

== Career statistics ==
=== Club ===
As of 25 November 2019

Appearances and goals by club, season and competition
Club	Season	League			Cup		Continental		Other		Total	
Club	Season	Division	Apps	Goals	Apps	Goals	Apps	Goals	Apps	Goals	Apps	Goals
Caracas	2002–03	Venezuelan Primera División	4	0	0	0	—		—		4	0
Caracas	2003–04	Venezuelan Primera División	4	1	0	0	—		—		4	1
Caracas	2004–05	Venezuelan Primera División	0	0	—		1 (Note: Appearance(s) in Copa Libertadores)	0	—		1	0
Caracas	2005–06	Venezuelan Primera División	25	6	—		6	0	—		31	6
Caracas	2006–07	Venezuelan Primera División	26	3	—		5	1	—		31	4
Caracas	2007–08	Venezuelan Primera División	23	4	—		1	0	—		24	4
Caracas	2008–09	Venezuelan Primera División	18	3	1	0	2	0	—		21	3
Caracas	2009–10	Venezuelan Primera División	28	6	0	0	5	0	—		33	6
Caracas	Total		128	23	1	0	20	1	0	0	149	24
Juventud Antoniana (loan)	2004–05	Primera B Nacional	0	0	0	0	—		—		0	0
Deportivo Anzoátegui	2010–11	Venezuelan Primera División	33	16	0	0	2 (Note: Appearance(s) in Copa Sudamericana)	1	—		35	17
Mineros de Guayana	2011–12	Venezuelan Primera División	31	4	—		—		—		31	4
Mineros de Guayana	2012–13	Venezuelan Primera División	36	7	0	0	4	3	—		40	10
Mineros de Guayana	2013–14	Venezuelan Primera División	27	7	0	0	4	0	—		31	7
Mineros de Guayana	Total		94	18	0	0	8	3	0	0	102	21
Atlético Nacional	2014	Categoría Primera A	10	1	5	1	5	0	—		20	2
Atlético Nacional	2015	Categoría Primera A	26	4	0	0	6	1	1 (Note: Appearance(s) in Superliga Colombiana)	0	33	5
Atlético Nacional	2016	Categoría Primera A	10	6	2	0	22 (Note: 13 appearances and three goals in Copa Libertadores, six appearances in Copa Sudamericana)	4	2	0	32	8
Atlético Nacional	Total		46	11	7	1	33	5	3	0	89	17
Palmeiras	2017	Série A	20	5	3	0	6	1	9 (Note: Appearance(s) in Campeonato Paulista)	1	38	7
Palmeiras	2018	Série A	9	1	3	0	4	0	8	0	24	1
Palmeiras	2019	Série A	0	0	0	0	0	0	0	0	0	0
Palmeiras	Total		29	6	6	0	10	1	17	1	62	8
Bahia (loan)	2019	Série A	17	1	1	0	—		—		18	1
Career total			347	75	15	1	73	11	20	1	453	88

=== International ===
As of 23 March 2017

Appearances and goals by national team and year
National team	Year	Apps	Goals
Venezuela	2006	8	0
Venezuela	2007	15	3
Venezuela	2008	5	0
Venezuela	2009	–	
Venezuela	2010	4	0
Venezuela	2011	2	0
Venezuela	2012	2	0
Venezuela	2014	3	0
Venezuela	2015	9	0
Venezuela	2016	10	0
Venezuela	2017	1	0
Total		59	3

Scores and results list Venezuela's goal tally first, score column indicates score after each Guerra goal.

List of international goals scored by Alejandro Guerra
No.	Date	Venue	Opponent	Score	Result	Competition
1	14 January 2007	José Pachencho Romero, Maracaibo, Venezuela	Sweden	1–0	2–0	Friendly
2	8 September 2007	Polideportivo Cachamay, Puerto Ordaz, Venezuela	Paraguay	3–2	3–2	Friendly
3	20 November 2007	Pueblo Nuevo, San Cristóbal, Venezuela	Bolivia	3–3	5–3	2010 FIFA World Cup qualification

== Honours ==
Caracas

- Venezuelan Primera División: 2003–04, 2005–06, 2006–07, 2008–09, 2009–10
- Copa Venezuela: 2009

Mineros de Guayana

- Copa Venezuela: 2011

Atlético Nacional

- Categoría Primera A: 2014–I, 2015–II
- Copa Colombia: 2016
- Superliga Colombiana: 2016
- Copa Libertadores: 2016

Palmeiras

- Campeonato Brasileiro Série A: 2018

Individual

- Copa Libertadores Best Player: 2016
