= 2007–08 Venezuelan Primera División season =

Venezuelan Primera División
- Season: 2007–08
- Champions: Deportivo Táchira (6th title)

The 2007–08 season of the Venezuelan Primera División, the top category of Venezuelan football, was played by 18 teams. The national champions were Deportivo Táchira.

== Torneo Apertura ==
Pos	Team	Pld	W	D	L	GF	GA	GD	Pts
1	Caracas	17	10	7	0	31	11	+20	37
2	Deportivo Anzoátegui	17	10	4	3	31	12	+19	34
3	Deportivo Táchira	17	7	7	3	22	10	+12	28
4	Unión Atlético Maracaibo	17	7	7	3	26	20	+6	28
5	Zamora	17	6	6	5	19	12	+7	24
6	Portuguesa	17	6	6	5	15	18	−3	24
7	Llaneros	17	6	5	6	25	23	+2	23
8	Mineros de Guayana	17	6	5	6	28	28	0	23
9	Aragua	17	6	5	6	30	30	0	23
10	Guaros	17	7	2	8	28	33	−5	23
11	Trujillanos	17	6	5	6	22	27	−5	23
12	Monagas	17	6	4	7	30	26	+4	22
13	Deportivo Italia	17	5	7	5	17	14	+3	22
14	Estudiantes de Mérida	17	5	5	7	21	28	−7	20
15	Atlético El Vigía	17	6	1	10	18	26	−8	19
16	Carabobo	17	4	3	10	13	25	−12	15
17	Unión Lara	17	3	5	9	25	32	−7	14
18	Estrella Roja	17	3	4	10	19	45	−26	13

== Torneo Clausura ==
Pos	Team	Pld	W	D	L	GF	GA	GD	Pts
1	Deportivo Táchira	17	13	3	1	30	15	+15	42
2	Caracas	17	10	6	1	34	18	+16	36
3	Deportivo Anzoátegui	17	10	2	5	33	14	+19	32
4	Deportivo Italia	17	7	7	3	23	16	+7	28
5	Guaros	17	8	4	5	19	14	+5	28
6	Unión Atlético Maracaibo	17	8	3	6	28	22	+6	27
7	Zamora	17	8	2	7	26	25	+1	26
8	Carabobo	17	6	6	5	19	16	+3	24
9	Estrella Roja	17	7	3	7	25	31	−6	24
10	Portuguesa	17	6	5	6	24	24	0	23
11	Atlético El Vigía	17	6	1	10	19	25	−6	19
12	Estudiantes de Mérida	17	4	6	7	18	26	−8	18
13	Llaneros	17	5	3	9	18	27	−9	18
14	Aragua	17	4	5	8	18	22	−4	17
15	Monagas	17	5	2	10	16	26	−10	17
16	Mineros de Guayana	17	3	7	7	18	22	−4	16
17	Unión Lara	17	3	5	9	18	30	−12	14
18	Trujillanos	17	3	4	10	18	31	−13	13

== Final Playoff ==
May 28, 2008

Caracas	1–1	Deportivo Táchira

May 31, 2008

Deportivo Táchira	0–0	Caracas
