= 2008 Copa Venezuela =

The 2008 Copa Venezuela was the 39th staging of the Copa Venezuela.

The competition started on August 27, 2008 and concluded on December 11, 2008 with a two leg final, in which Deportivo Anzoátegui won the trophy for the first time with a 2-1 win at home and a 1-0 win away over Estudiantes de Mérida.

== First round ==
The matches were played on 27 August 2008.

Team 1	Score	Team 2
Marineros FC	0-0; 3-4 (pen)	Centro Ítalo FC
Minasoro FC	1-0	UA Piar FC
Atlético Orinoco	1-3	UNEFA FC
Fund. CESARGER	0-1	Real Esppor
Tucanes FC	0-2	Hermandad Gallega
UCV Aragua	1-1; 3-1 (pen)	UCV FC
Acad. San José	1-2	Estrella Roja FC
UA Falcón	0-1	Yaracuyanos FC
UA Lagunillas	0-1	Baralt FC
Atl. Cojedes	1-2	Policía de Lara FC
Unión Lara FC	1-2	UCLA FC
UA San Antonio	4-3	Dvo Barinas
Atl. Córdova	1-2	Atl. Varyná CF
Acad. Emeritense	0-2	Trujillanos FC
Santa Bárbara FC	1-2	UA Trujillo

Bye: UA Maracaibo, Minervén FC, Monagas SC, Dvo. Táchira, Atl. El Vigía FC, Carabobo FC, Dep. Italia FC, Llaneros FC, Guaros de Lara FC, Estudiantes FC, Portuguesa FC, Dep. Anzoátegui SC, AC Mineros de Guayana, Caracas FC, Zamora FC, Aragua FC and Zulia FC.

== Second round ==
One leg - 2A/2B Division Teams v/s 1 Division Teams. The matches were played on 5–7 September 2008.

Team 1	Score	Team 2
UNEFA FC	4-2	Minervén FC
Real Esppor	1-0	Monagas SC
UCV Aragua	0-1	Dep. Italia FC
UCLA FC	0-2	Llaneros FC
UA Trujillo	0-3	Atl. El Vigía FC
Centro Ítalo FC	0-1	Dep. Anzoátegui SC
Minasoro FC	1-0	AC Mineros de Guayana
Hermandad Gallega	0-5	Caracas FC
Yaracuyanos FC	1-4	Aragua FC
Baralt FC	2-1	Zulia FC
Policía de Lara FC	2-0	UA Maracaibo
UA San Antonio	1-0	Dvo. Táchira
Atl. Varyná CF	2-1	Zamora FC
Trujillanos FC	1-2	Estudiantes FC

Two legs - 1 Division Teams v/s 1 Division Teams. The matches were played on 4-7 September 2008.

Team 1	Agg.	Team 2	1st leg	2nd leg
Estrella Roja FC	1-5	Carabobo FC	1-4	0-1
Portuguesa FC	2-1	Guaros de Lara FC	0-0	2-1

== Third round ==
The matches were played on 17 September-1 October 2008.

Team 1	Agg.	Team 2	1st leg	2nd leg
UNEFA FC	1-2	Carabobo FC	0-1	1-1
Atl. El Vigía FC	2-2 (a)	Llaneros FC	0-0	2-2
Dep. Anzoátegui SC	3-2	Caracas FC	2-1	1-1
Portuguesa FC	1-2	UA San Antonio	0-0	1-2
Baralt FC	2-2; 7-8 (pen)	Atl. Varyná CF	1-1	1-1
Policía de Lara FC	1-4	Estudiantes FC	0-1	1-3
Minasoro FC	1-2	Dep. Italia FC	1-0	0-2
Aragua FC	2-2; 6-7 (pen)	Real Esppor	1-1	1-1

== Quarterfinals ==
The matches were played on 8-15 October 2008.

Team 1	Agg.	Team 2	1st leg	2nd leg
Dep. Italia FC	1-2	Estudiantes FC	1-0	0-2
Carabobo FC	3-4	Atl. El Vigía FC	3-1	0-3 (awd)
Atl. Varyná CF	2-3	Dep. Anzoátegui SC	1-2	1-1
Real Esppor	2-3	UA San Antonio	2-2	0-1

== Semifinals ==
The matches were played on 22-29 October and 12-26 November 2008.

Team 1	Agg.	Team 2	1st leg	2nd leg
Estudiantes FC	5-1	UA San Antonio	3-0	2-1
Atl. El Vigía FC	1-6	Dep. Anzoátegui SC	1-3	0-3

== Finals ==
The matches were played on 3-11 December 2008.

Team 1	Agg.	Team 2	1st leg	2nd leg
Dep. Anzoátegui SC	3-1	Estudiantes FC	2-1	1-0

Dep. Anzoátegui SC champions and qualify to Copa Nissan Sudamericana 2009.
