= 2008–09 in Venezuelan football =

Football in Venezuela
- Season: 2008–09

The following article presents a summary of the 2008-09 football season in Venezuela.

== Segunda División A ==
=== Torneo Apertura ("Opening" Tournament) ===
P	Team	Pld	W	D	L	GF	GA	GD	Pts
1	Unión Atlético Trujillo	15	11	3	1	29	14	+15	36
2	Real Esppor Club	15	9	5	1	30	13	+17	32
3	Centro Italo Venezolano	15	9	4	2	31	15	+16	31
4	Trujillanos FC	15	9	2	4	33	17	+16	29
5	Policía de Lara	15	8	0	7	23	21	+2	24
6	Caracas FC B	15	5	6	4	18	13	+5	21
7	Hermandad Gallega	15	6	3	6	22	23	-1	21
8	UCV FC	15	5	5	5	20	19	-1	20
9	Deportivo Barinas	15	4	6	5	23	18	+5	18
10	Yaracuyanos FC	15	4	6	5	20	19	+1	18
11	Unión Lara	15	5	3	7	22	25	-3	18
12	Atlético Varyná	15	4	4	7	14	19	-5	16
13	Baralt FC	15	4	3	8	11	22	-11	15
14	Atlético Piar FC	15	4	2	9	11	25	-14	14
15	UNEFA FC	15	3	4	8	9	20	-11	13
16	UCLA FC	15	1	2	12	7	39	-32	5

Last updated: 14 December 2008
Source: FVF
Rules for classification: 1st points; 2nd goal difference; 3rd goals scored. P = Position; Pld = Matches played; W = Matches won; D = Matches drawn; L = Matches lost; GF = Goals for; GA = Goals against; GD = Goal difference; Pts = Points.

=== Torneo Clausura ("Closing" Tournament) ===
P	Team	Pld	W	D	L	GF	GA	GD	Pts
1	Centro Italo Venezolano	14	10	3	1	31	12	+19	33
2	Real Esppor Club	14	10	1	3	27	15	+12	31
3	Trujillanos FC	14	10	1	3	22	13	+9	31
4	Unión Atlético Trujillo	14	7	3	4	26	20	+6	24
5	Deportivo Barinas	14	7	2	5	26	21	+5	23
6	UCV FC	14	5	5	4	15	17	-2	20
7	Policía de Lara	14	5	4	5	22	20	+2	19
8	Caracas FC B	14	5	4	5	22	24	-2	19
9	Atlético Varyná	14	5	3	6	21	20	+1	18
10	Yaracuyanos FC	14	4	6	4	18	18	0	18
11	Unión Lara	14	5	2	7	17	24	-7	17
12	Hermandad Gallega	14	2	5	7	16	23	-7	11
13	Atlético Piar FC	14	3	2	9	17	27	-10	11
14	UNEFA FC	14	2	4	8	18	27	-9	13
15	UCLA FC	14	1	3	10	11	28	-17	6

Last updated: 26 May 2009
Source: FVF
Rules for classification: 1st points; 2nd goal difference; 3rd goals scored. P = Position; Pld = Matches played; W = Matches won; D = Matches drawn; L = Matches lost; GF = Goals for; GA = Goals against; GD = Goal difference; Pts = Points.

=== Aggregate Table ===
P	Team	Pld	W	D	L	GF	GA	GD	Pts	Qualification or relegation
1	Centro Italo Venezolano	29	19	7	3	52	28	+34	64	Primera División 2009-10
2	Real Esppor Club^{1}	29	19	6	4	57	28	+29	63	Primera División 2009-10
3	Trujillanos FC^{3}	29	19	3	7	55	30	+25	60	Primera División 2009-10
4	Unión Atlético Trujillo^{1}	29	18	6	5	55	34	+21	60	
5	Policía de Lara	29	13	4	12	45	41	+4	43	
6	Deportivo Barinas	29	11	8	10	49	39	+10	41	
7	Caracas FC B	29	10	10	9	40	37	+3	40	
8	UCV FC	29	10	10	9	36	36	0	40	
9	Yaracuyanos FC^{2}	29	8	12	9	38	38	0	36	Primera División 2009-10
10	Unión Lara	29	10	5	14	39	49	-10	35	
11	Atlético Varyná	29	9	7	13	35	39	-4	34	
12	Hermandad Gallega	29	8	8	13	38	46	-8	32	
13	Atlético Piar FC	29	7	4	18	28	52	-24	25	
14	UNEFA FC	29	5	8	16	27	47	-20	23	
15	Baralt FC	15	4	3	8	11	22	-11	15	Segunda División B 2009-10
16	UCLA FC	29	2	5	22	18	67	-49	11	Segunda División B 2009-10

Last updated: 26 May 2009
Source: FVF
^{1}Although the Union Atlético Trujillo qualified to the First Division, were not inscribed due to the merger with Real Esspor.
^{2}Yaracuyanos FC bought UA Maracaibo spot.
^{3}Trujillanos FC promoted.
Rules for classification: 1st points; 2nd goal difference; 3rd goals scored. P = Position; Pld = Matches played; W = Matches won; D = Matches drawn; L = Matches lost; GF = Goals for; GA = Goals against; GD = Goal difference; Pts = Points.

== Segunda División B ==
=== Grupo Centro Oriental ===
P	Team	Pld	W	D	L	GF	GA	GD	Pts
1	Minasoro FC	14	10	2	2	28	11	+17	32
2	Fundación Cesarger	14	9	1	4	24	14	+10	28
3	Tucanes de Amazonas	14	6	2	6	18	17	+1	20
4	Atlético Orinoco	14	5	5	4	21	20	+1	20
5	Academia San José	14	4	5	5	15	16	-1	17
6	Carabobo FC B	14	3	6	5	15	19	-4	15
7	Marineros Margarita	14	3	3	8	13	20	-7	12
8	UCV Aragua	14	2	3	9	11	28	-17	9

=== Grupo Centro Occidental ===
P	Team	Pld	W	D	L	GF	GA	GD	Pts
1	U.A. San Antonio	14	8	5	1	35	15	+20	29
2	Deportivo Táchira B	14	7	6	1	32	19	+13	27
3	Atlético Cojedes	14	7	4	3	28	21	+7	25
4	Atlético Córdova	14	5	8	1	24	16	+8	23
5	U.A. Lagunillas	14	5	3	6	23	22	+1	18
6	Academia Emeritense	14	5	1	8	31	26	+5	16
7	Santa Barbara FC	14	3	4	7	21	30	-9	13
8	Atlético Falcón	14	0	1	13	6	51	-45	1

Last updated: 14 December 2008
Source: FVF
Rules for classification: 1st points; 2nd goal difference; 3rd goals scored. P = Position; Pld = Matches played; W = Matches won; D = Matches drawn; L = Matches lost; GF = Goals for; GA = Goals against; GD = Goal difference; Pts = Points.

=== Promotion playoff ===
Minasoro FC and U.A. San Antonio finished the tournament as champions of the Apertura: Grupo Centro Oriental and Grupo Centro Occidental respectively, because of this they have to play a promotion playoff.

December 13, 2008

U.A. San Antonio	3 – 1	Minasoro FC
Rotman Burguillos 9' 75'; Robinson Salgado 61'		Edwin Ruiz 57'

Estadio Brígido Iriarte, Caracas

=== Grupo Centro Oriental ===
P	Team	Pld	W	D	L	GF	GA	GD	Pts
1	Fundación Cesarger	14	11	2	1	35	12	+23	35
2	Atlético Orinoco	14	9	3	2	29	12	+17	30
3	Marineros Margarita	14	7	4	3	20	12	+8	25
4	Carabobo FC B	14	6	1	7	16	24	-8	19
5	Tucanes de Amazonas	14	5	3	6	11	19	-8	18
6	Minasoro FC	14	4	4	6	21	16	+5	16
7	Academia San José	14	3	2	9	15	25	-10	11
8	UCV Aragua	14	1	1	12	8	35	-27	4

=== Grupo Centro Occidental ===
P	Team	Pld	W	D	L	GF	GA	GD	Pts
1	U.A. San Antonio	12	9	3	0	22	9	+13	30
2	Deportivo Táchira B	12	8	3	1	38	21	+17	27
3	Atlético Córdova	12	6	2	4	21	16	+5	20
4	Academia Emeritense	12	5	0	7	20	23	-3	15
5	U.A. Lagunillas	12	3	3	6	19	22	-3	12
6	Atlético Cojedes	12	2	3	7	15	22	-7	9
7	Santa Bárbara FC	12	2	0	10	13	35	-22	6

Last updated: 10 May 2009
Source: FVF
Rules for classification: 1st points; 2nd goal difference; 3rd goals scored. P = Position; Pld = Matches played; W = Matches won; D = Matches drawn; L = Matches lost; GF = Goals for; GA = Goals against; GD = Goal difference; Pts = Points.

=== Promotion playoff ===
Fundación Cesarger and U.A. San Antonio finished the tournament as champions of the Clausura: Grupo Centro Oriental and Grupo Centro Occidental respectively, because of this they have to play a promotion playoff.

May 24, 2009

U.A. San Antonio	1 – 2	Fundación Cesarger
Robinson Salgado 50'		Daniel Alvarez 57'; Jorge Bermúdez 63'

Estadio Brígido Iriarte, Caracas

=== Grupo Centro Oriental ===
P	Team	Pld	W	D	L	GF	GA	GD	Pts	Qualification or relegation
1	Fundación Cesarger	28	20	3	5	59	26	+33	63	Segunda División 2009-10
2	Atlético Orinoco	28	14	8	6	50	32	+18	50	
3	Minasoro FC	28	14	6	8	49	27	+22	48	
4	Tucanes de Amazonas	28	11	5	12	29	36	-7	38	
5	Marineros Margarita	28	10	7	11	33	32	+1	37	
6	Carabobo FC B	28	9	7	12	31	43	-12	34	
7	Academia San José	28	7	7	14	30	41	-11	28	Tercera División 2009-10
8	UCV Aragua	28	3	4	21	19	63	-44	13	Tercera División 2009-10

=== Grupo Centro Occidental ===
P	Team	Pld	W	D	L	GF	GA	GD	Pts	Qualification or relegation
1	U.A. San Antonio	26	17	8	1	57	24	+33	59	Segunda División 2009-10
2	Deportivo Táchira B	26	15	9	2	70	40	+30	54	
3	Atlético Córdova	26	11	10	5	45	32	+13	43	
4	Atlético Cojedes	26	9	7	10	43	43	0	34	
5	Academia Emeritense	26	10	1	15	51	49	+2	31	
6	U.A. Lagunillas	26	8	6	12	42	44	-2	30	
7	Santa Bárbara FC	26	5	4	17	34	65	-31	19	Tercera División 2009-10
8	Atlético Falcón	14	0	1	13	6	51	-45	1	Tercera División 2009-10

Last updated: 10 May 2009
Source: FVF
Rules for classification: 1st points; 2nd goal difference; 3rd goals scored. P = Position; Pld = Matches played; W = Matches won; D = Matches drawn; L = Matches lost; GF = Goals for; GA = Goals against; GD = Goal difference; Pts = Points.

== Venezuela national team ==
This section will cover Venezuela's games from August 19, 2008 until June 27, 2009.

Date	Venue	Opponents	Score	Comp	Venezuela scorers	Match Report(s)
August 19, 2008	Olímpico Luis Ramos; Puerto la Cruz, Venezuela	Syria	4 - 1	F	L. Vielma 13'; G. Maldonado 50'; J. Rojas 53' (pen); A. Moreno 59'	FVF
September 6, 2008	Estadio Monumental "U"; Lima, Peru	Peru	1 - 0	WCQ2010		CONMEBOL
September 9, 2008	Defensores del Chaco; Asunción, Paraguay	Paraguay	2 - 0	WCQ2010		CONMEBOL
October 11, 2008	Pueblo Nuevo; San Cristóbal, Venezuela	Brazil	0 - 4	WCQ2010		CONMEBOL
October 15, 2008	Olímpico Luis Ramos; Puerto la Cruz, Venezuela	Ecuador	3 - 1	WCQ2010	G. Maldonado 47'; A. Moreno 56'; J. Arango 67'	CONMEBOL
November 19, 2008	Estadio La Carolina; Barinas, Venezuela	Angola	0 - 0	F		FVF
February 11, 2009	Estadio Monumental de Maturín; Maturín, Venezuela	Guatemala	2 - 1	F	G. Maldonado 64'; J.S. Rondón 89'	FVF
March 28, 2009	Estadio Monumental; Buenos Aires, Argentina	Argentina	4 - 0	WCQ2010		CONMEBOL
March 31, 2009	Polideportivo Cachamay; Puerto Ordaz, Venezuela	Colombia	2 - 0	WCQ2010	Miku 78'; J. Arango 82'	CONMEBOL
May 13, 2009	Estadio José Pachencho Romero; Maracaibo, Venezuela	Costa Rica	1 - 1	F	J.M. Velásquez 25'	FVF
June 6, 2009	Estadio Hernando Siles; La Paz, Bolivia	Bolivia	0 - 1	WCQ2010	Rivero 33' (o.g.)	CONMEBOL
June 10, 2009	Polideportivo Cachamay; Puerto Ordaz, Venezuela	Uruguay	2 – 2	WCQ2010	G. Maldonado 9'; J.M. Rey 75'	FIFA
June 24, 2009	Georgia Dome; Atlanta, United States	Mexico	4 – 0	F		FVF
June 27, 2009	Estadio Ricardo Saprissa Aymá; San José, Costa Rica	Costa Rica	1 – 0	F		FVF

KEY:

  - F = Friendly match
  - WCQ2010 = 2010 FIFA World Cup qualification
