= Yonathan Del Valle =

Venezuelan footballer (born 1990)

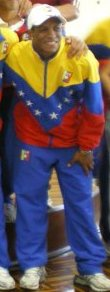
- 2009

Personal information
- Full name: Yonathan Alexander; Del Valle Rodríguez
- Date of birth: 28 May 1990 (age 36)
- Place of birth: Valencia, Venezuela
- Height: 1.77 m (5 ft 10 in)
- Position: Striker

Senior career*
Years	Team	Apps	(Gls)
2007–2008	Maracaibo	11	(0)
2008–2011	Deportivo Táchira	47	(5)
2011–2014	Auxerre	0	(0)
2012–2013	→ Rio Ave (loan)	23	(2)
2013–2014	→ Paços de Ferreira (loan)	16	(3)
2014–2017	Rio Ave	28	(5)
2015–2016	→ Kasımpaşa (loan)	33	(5)
2016–2017	→ Bursaspor (loan)	21	(1)
2017–2019	Gazişehir Gaziantep	58	(15)
2019–2020	Giresunspor	32	(7)
2020–2021	Bandırmaspor	28	(6)
2021–2023	Ümraniyespor	52	(10)
2023	Eyüpspor	15	(1)
2023–2024	Sakaryaspor	36	(16)
2024–2025	Pendikspor	27	(5)
2025	Carabobo	14	(0)

International career
2009	Venezuela U20	11	(6)
2009–	Venezuela	14	(0)
- * Club domestic league appearances and goals as of 15 June 2025

Yonathan Alexander Del Valle Rodríguez (born 28 May 1990) is a Venezuelan professional footballer.

== Club career ==
His first professional team was Carabobo FC, in which he didn't play too much due to his young age. Then he moved to Unión Atlético Maracaibo from which he exit after personal problems with the team. He signed with Deportivo Táchira on 2008, having more action and gaining more recognition to the point of being signed by Club Atlético Huracán from Argentina only to be sent back after no official matches with the team because the foreign spots in the team were already full.

In August 2011 Del Valle signed with AJ Auxerre, becoming the first Venezuelan player in Ligue 1.

Following relegation in the 2011-12 season, he moved from Auxerre on loan to the Portuguese Primeira Liga side Rio Ave on 12 July 2012.

== International career ==
On 25 September 2009 he became the first Venezuelan to score a goal in a FIFA competition, having scored against Nigeria in the 2009 FIFA U-20 World Cup. Three days later he managed a hat-trick against Tahiti in the Venezuelan 8–0 victory.

== Club statistics ==
Accurate as of 28 May 2013.

Club	Season	League		Cup		Continental		Total	
Club	Season	Apps	Goals	Apps	Goals	Apps	Goals	Apps	Goals
Maracaibo	2007–08	11	0			1	0	12	0
Maracaibo	Total	11	0			1	0	12	0
Deportivo Táchira	2008–09	14	0			2	1	16	1
Deportivo Táchira	2009–10	14	3			0	0	14	3
Deportivo Táchira	2010–11	19	2			5	0	24	2
Deportivo Táchira	Total	47	5			7	1	48	6
Auxerre	2011–12	0	0	0	0	0	0	0	0
Auxerre	Total	0	0	0	0	0	0	0	0
Rio Ave	2012–13	23	2	5	0	0	0	28	2
Rio Ave	Total	23	2	5	0	0	0	28	2
Career totals		81	7	5	0	8	1	94	8

== Honours ==
=== Club ===
Deportivo Táchira

- Venezuelan Primera División: 2010–11
