= Rafael Dudamel =

Venezuelan footballer and manager (born 1973)

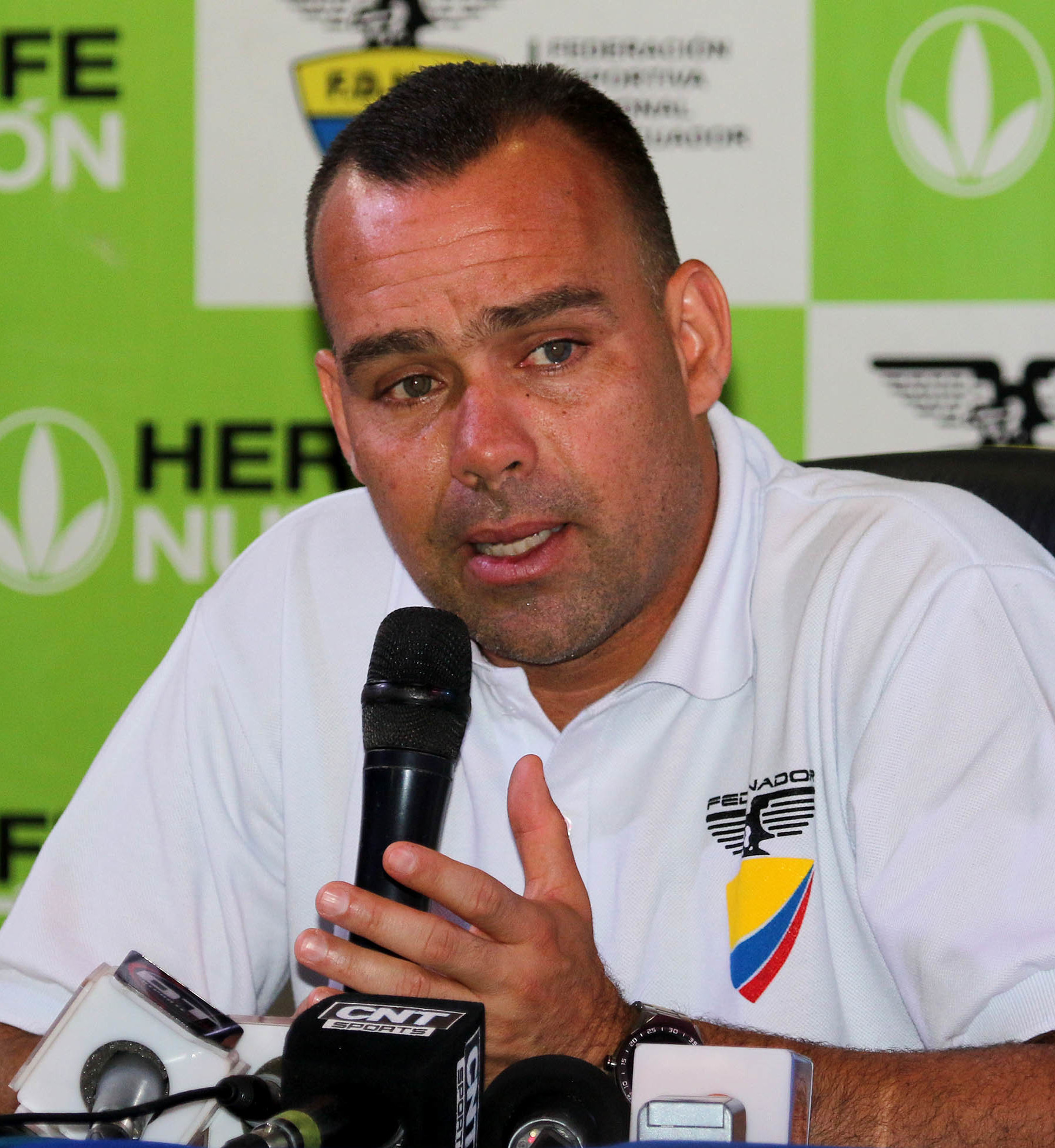
- Dudamel in 2017

Personal information
- Full name: Rafael Édgar Dudamel Ochoa
- Date of birth: January 7, 1973 (age 53)
- Place of birth: San Felipe, Yaracuy, Venezuela
- Height: 1.87 m (6 ft 2 in)
- Position: Goalkeeper

Team information
- Current team: Deportivo Cali (manager)

Youth career
- 1989–1993: Universidad Los Andes

Senior career*
Years	Team	Apps	(Gls)
1989–1994	Universidad Los Andes		
1994	Atlético Huila		
1994	El Vigía		
1995–1997	Santa Fe	88	(3)
1997–1998	Atlético Zulia	18	(1)
1998	Quilmes	17	(1)
1998–2001	Deportivo Cali	142	(11)
2001–2002	Millonarios	20	(0)
2002–2004	UA Maracaibo	35	(2)
2004	Cortuluá	17	(0)
2005	Deportivo Táchira	14	(0)
2005–2006	Mamelodi Sundowns	7	(0)
2007	Estudiantes de Mérida	20	(3)
2007–2008	América de Cali	11	(0)
2008–2009	Estudiantes de Mérida	15	(0)
2009–2010	Real Esppor		(0)
Total		404	(21)

International career
1993–2010	Venezuela	57	(1)

Managerial career
- 2010–2011: Estudiantes de Mérida
- 2012–2013: Venezuela U17
- 2014–2015: Deportivo Lara
- 2015–2019: Venezuela U20
- 2016–2020: Venezuela
- 2020: Atlético Mineiro
- 2020–2021: Universidad de Chile
- 2021–2022: Deportivo Cali
- 2023: Necaxa
- 2024: Atlético Bucaramanga
- 2025: Deportivo Pereira
- 2026–: Deportivo Cali
Medal record
Men's football
Representing Venezuela (as manager)
FIFA U-20 World Cup
Runner-up	2017
- * Club domestic league appearances and goals

Rafael Édgar Dudamel Ochoa (born January 7, 1973), is a Venezuelan football manager and former player, currently in charge of Colombian club Deportivo Cali.

A goalkeeper, Dudamel made 56 appearances for the Venezuela national team.

== Club career ==
During his career, Dudamel played for several Venezuelan and Colombian football clubs. Among the Venezuelan clubs are Universidad de Los Andes, El Vigía, Atlético Zulia, UA Maracaibo and Deportivo Táchira. Atlético Huila, Independiente Santa Fe, Deportivo Cali, Millonarios and Cortulua are the Colombian clubs where he played. He has also played for Quilmes, of Argentina. He was transferred to Mamelodi Sundowns, of South Africa in 2005. In 2007 after the Copa America, he transferred to América de Cali, a top Colombian club, alongside Venezuelan international Jorge Rojas. He left América and returned to Estudiantes de Mérida on August 29, 2008.

== International career ==
As of November 2007, Dudamel has 56 caps and one goal for the Venezuela national football team. He was capped for the first time in 1993. He scored a direct free kick in the World Cup 1998 qualifier against Argentina.

== Managerial career ==
On 18 October 2017 Dudamel is appointed manager of Venezuela's national football team.

On 5 June 2016 Dudamel gets his first win in an official tournament as national coach with a 1–0 victory over Jamaica in the 2016 Copa America. In his next match at the tournament, he upsets Uruguay 1–0. The winner was scored by Salomon Rondón, who tapped in after a long range attempt by Alejandro Guerra was saved. In the final group match, he drew against Mexico 1-1. In the knockout stages, Venezuela lost immediately, 4–1 to Argentina.

At the 2017 FIFA Under-20 World Cup, Dudamel led the U20s to the final, where they lost to England 1–0 in the final. It was the nation's best ever performance at U20 competition.

On 2 January 2020, he resigned from the Venezuela national team, and four days later signed a two-year contract with Brazilian club Atlético Mineiro. On 27 February 2020, he was sacked by Atlético, following eliminations from the Copa Sudamericana and the Copa do Brasil.

He spent time at Universidad de Chile between 2020 and 2021, and in September 2021 he was appointed as manager of Deportivo Cali, becoming Colombian champion at the end of the season.

== Career statistics ==
No.	Date	Venue	Opponent	Score	Result	Competition	Ref.
1.	October 9, 1996	Pueblo Nuevo, San Cristóbal, Venezuela	Argentina	2–4	2–5	1998 FIFA World Cup qualification	

== Managerial statistics ==
As of Match played 20 November 2026

Team	Nat	From	To	Record				
Team	Nat	From	To	G	W	D	L	Win %
Estudiantes de Mérida	(Venezuela)	17 May 2010	17 March 2011	26	6	6	14	23.08
Venezuela U17	(Venezuela)	12 May 2012	8 November 2013	13	3	5	5	23.08
Deportivo Lara	(Venezuela)	18 December 2013	25 November 2015	90	35	33	22	38.89
Venezuela U20	(Venezuela)	17 August 2015	15 August 2019	40	18	9	13	45.00
Venezuela	(Venezuela)	1 April 2016	4 January 2020	35	9	15	11	25.71
Atlético Mineiro	(Brazil)	4 January 2020	26 February 2020	10	4	3	3	40.00
Universidad de Chile	(Chile)	5 November 2020	5 June 2021	26	8	12	6	30.77
Deportivo Cali	(Colombia)	7 September 2021	1 July 2022	55	18	19	18	32.73
Necaxa	(Mexico)	16 May 2023	27 August 2023	8	0	2	6	0.00
Atlético Bucaramanga	(Colombia)	1 December 2023	27 November 2024	58	28	17	13	48.28
Deportivo Pereira	(Colombia)	9 April 2025	29 October 2025	33	13	10	10	39.39
Deportivo Cali	(Colombia)	9 March 2026	present	34	17	12	5	50.00
Total				427	159	143	125	37.24

- Official FIFA matches only.

== Honors ==
=== Player ===
Universidad de Los Andes

- Primera División Venezolana: 1990–91

Santa Fe

- Copa Conmebol runner-up: 1996

Atlético Zulia

- Primera División Venezolana: 1997–98

Deportivo Cali

- Categoría Primera A: 1998
- Copa Merconorte runner-up: 1998
- Copa Libertadores runner-up: 1999

Millonarios

- Copa Merconorte: 2001

Mamelodi Sundowns

- Premier Soccer League: 2005–06

=== Coach ===
Venezuela

- Kirin Cup: 2019

Venezuela U-20

- FIFA U-20 World Cup runner-up: 2017
- South American Youth Football Championship third place: 2017

Venezuela U-17

- South American Under-17 Football Championship runner-up: 2013

Deportivo Cali

- Categoría Primera A: 2021–II

Atlético Bucaramanga

- Categoría Primera A: 2024–I
