= Franklin Lucena =

Venezuelan footballer (born 1981)

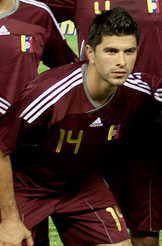
- Lucena in a 2014 World Cup qualification match.

Personal information
- Full name: Franklin José Lucena Peña
- Date of birth: 20 February 1981 (age 45)
- Place of birth: Acarigua, Venezuela
- Height: 1.81 m (5 ft 11 in)
- Position: Defensive midfielder

Youth career
- 2001–2002: Portuguesa

Senior career*
Years	Team	Apps	(Gls)
2002–2006	Deportivo Táchira	78	(2)
2006–2012	Caracas	116	(8)
2012–2015	Deportivo La Guaira	70	(10)
2015–2016	Once Caldas	39	(2)
2016–2017	Deportivo La Guaira	33	(1)
2017–2020	Portuguesa FC	73	(5)

International career
2007–2015	Venezuela	56	(2)

Managerial career
- 2021–2022: Portuguesa FC (assistant)
- 2023: Estudiantes de Mérida (assistant)
- 2023–2024: Estudiantes de Mérida
- * Club domestic league appearances and goals

Franklin José Lucena Peña (Spanish pronunciation: [ˈfraŋkliŋ xoˈse luˈsena], born 20 February 1981) is a Venezuelan football coach and former player who played as a defensive midfielder.

== Honours ==
Caracas

- Venezuelan Primera División: 2007 Apertura, 2009 Clausura, 2010 Clausura
- Copa Venezuela: 2009
