= José Manuel Velázquez =

Venezuelan footballer (born 1990)

Personal information
- Full name: José Manuel Velázquez Rodríguez
- Date of birth: 8 September 1990 (age 36)
- Place of birth: Ciudad Bolívar, Venezuela
- Height: 1.84 m (6 ft 0 in)
- Position: Centre-back

Team information
- Current team: Puerto Cabello
- Number: 4

Senior career*
Years	Team	Apps	(Gls)
2007–2008	ACD Lara	14	(0)
2008–2009	Anzoátegui	32	(4)
2009–2012	Villarreal B	0	(0)
2011–2012	→ Mineros (loan)	42	(2)
2012–2014	Panathinaikos	9	(1)
2014–2015	Mineros	26	(0)
2015–2017	Arouca	40	(3)
2017–2019	Veracruz	6	(0)
2019	Nacional	0	(0)
2020	Deportivo Táchira	9	(0)
2021–2023	Arouca	19	(0)
2023–2024	Santa Clara	6	(1)
2024–2025	Alverca	12	(1)
2025–2026	União de Leiria	1	(0)
2026–	Puerto Cabello	0	(0)

International career^{‡}
2008–2009	Venezuela U20	4	(2)
2009–	Venezuela	29	(3)
- * Club domestic league appearances and goals as of 00:12, 12 January 2026 (UTC) ‡ National team caps and goals as of 20:40, 27 January 2022 (UTC)

José Manuel "Sema" Velázquez Rodríguez, (born 8 September 1990) is a Venezuelan professional footballer who plays as a centre-back for Venezuelan Primera División club Academia Puerto Cabello and the Venezuela national team.

== Club career ==
Velázquez started his career at just six when he started to play for various youth clubs in town. He made his professional debut with ACD Lara in 2007. Having made himself a regular at the age of 17, Deportivo Anzoátegui secured his services at the beginning of 2008.

He signed for Villarreal in 2009 to play for its reserve team. However, he did not feature in any match since he joined the squad, and was loaned to Venezuelan club Mineros de Guayana for the end of the 2010–11 season and the whole 2011–12 campaign.

On 7 July 2012, he signed a three-year contract for Panathinaikos.

On 3 July 2025, Sema signed a one-season deal with União de Leiria.

In January 2026, he returned to Venezuela, joining Primera División club Academia Puerto Cabello.

== International career ==
Velázquez has played at every level from under-15 to under-20.

=== International goals ===
As of match played 13 June 2016. Venezuela score listed first, score column indicates score after each Velázquez goal.

International goals by date, venue, cap, opponent, score, result and competition
No.	Date	Venue	Cap	Opponent	Score	Result	Competition
1	13 May 2009	Estadio Polideportivo de Pueblo Nuevo, San Cristóbal, Venezuela	5	Costa Rica	1–0	1–1	Friendly
2	13 June 2016	NRG Stadium, Houston, United States	19	Mexico	1–0	1–1	Copa América Centenario
3	3 June 2017	Rio Tinto Stadium, Sandy, United States	25	United States	1–0	1–1	Friendly

=== Under 20s ===
Velázquez was selected to play for Venezuela in the 2009 South American Youth Championship by César Farías, partnering Carlos Salazar in central defence. During the Round of 16 of the 2009 FIFA U-20 World Cup held in Egypt, he play the full 90 minutes against UAE but Venezuela was eventually defeated 1–2.

=== Senior team ===
Velázquez is a member of the Venezuela national football team, having debuted on 28 March 2009 against Argentina.

== Honours ==
Deportivo Anzoátegui SC

- Copa Venezuela: 2008

AC Mineros

- Copa Venezuela: 2011
