= Llaneros FC =

Llaneros FC may refer to:

- Llaneros de Guanare, Venezuela
- Llaneros F.C., Colombia
