= 2009 Copa Venezuela =

The 2009 Copa Venezuela was the 40th staging of the Copa Venezuela.

The competition started on September 2, 2009, and concluded on December 2, 2009, with a two leg final, in which Caracas FC won the trophy for the fifth time with a 3–0 win away and a 1–0 win at home over Trujillanos FC.

== First round ==
The matches were played on 2–3 September 2009.

Team 1	Score	Team 2
Fundación CESARGER	2-3	UA Piar
UA Aragua	3-2	UCV FC
La Victoria FC	0-0; 4-2 (pen)	Tucanes de Amazonas FC
Pellícano FC	0-1	Atletico Nacional
Atlético Venezuela	0-0; 5-4 (pen)	Hermandad Gallega
UCV Aragua	0-1	Estrella Roja FC
Atlético Cojedes	2-1	Portuguesa FC
Academia Emeritense	2-2; 4-3 (pen)	Deportivo Barinas
Real Bolívar	1-0	UA Maracaibo
Atlético Córdova	1-4	UA San Antonio
Lotería del Táchira	1-0	D San Antonio
Minasoro FC	2-2; 7-6 (pen)	Caroní FC
UA Lagunillas	0-3	Lara FC
Angostura FC	bye	

== Second round ==
One leg - 2A/2B Division Teams v/s 1 Division Teams. The matches were played on 5–6 September 2009.

Team 1	Score	Team 2
Angostura FC	0-5	Mineros FC
Estrella Roja FC	1-1; 11-12 (pen)	Centro Ítalo FC
Real Bolívar	0-1	CD Lara
UA San Antonio	1-1; 2-4 (pen)	Estudiantes FC
Minasoro FC	1-2	Monagas SC
UA Piar	0-2	Dvo Anzoátegui
UA Aragua	2-3	Caracas FC
La Victoria FC	0-0; 2-4 (pen)	Real Esppor
Atletico Nacional	1-4	Dvo Italia
Atlético Venezuela	3-2	Aragua FC
Atlético Cojedes	0-3	Llaneros FC
Academia Emeritense	0-1	Zamora FC
Lotería del Táchira	0-2	Dvo. Táchira
Lara FC	1-2	Zulia FC

Two legs - 1 Division Teams v/s 1 Division Teams. The matches were played on 5–9 September 2009.

Team 1	Agg.	Team 2	1st leg	2nd leg
Carabobo FC	4-2	Yaracuyanos FC	0-2	4-0
Trujillanos FC	3-2	Atl. El Vigía FC	1-0	2-2

== Third round ==
The matches were played on 16–30 September 2009.

Team 1	Agg.	Team 2	1st leg	2nd leg
Estudiantes FC	0-6	Dvo. Táchira	0-3	0-3
Trujillanos FC	4-2	Zulia FC	2-2	2-0
Llaneros FC	1-5	Zamora FC	0-1	1-4
Carabobo FC	3-2	CD Lara	1-0	2-2
Monagas SC	2-2 (a)	Mineros FC	1-0	1-2
Centro Ítalo FC	1-7	Caracas FC	0-4	1-3
Real Esppor	2-2 (a)	Dvo Italia	1-2	1-0
Dvo Anzoátegui	2-1	Atlético Venezuela	0-1	2-0

== Quarterfinals ==
The matches were played on 7 October–4 November 2009.

Team 1	Agg.	Team 2	1st leg	2nd leg
Trujillanos FC	3-2	Carabobo FC	2-1	1-1
Dvo Italia	1-6	Caracas FC	1-5	0-1
Zamora FC	2-3	Dvo. Táchira	2-1	0-2
Dvo Anzoátegui	3-4	Monagas SC	2-3	1-1

== Semifinals ==
The matches were played on 11–18 November 2009.

Team 1	Agg.	Team 2	1st leg	2nd leg
Trujillanos FC	3-2	Dvo. Táchira	2-1	1-1
Monagas SC	1-5	Caracas FC	1-2	0-3

== Finals ==
The matches were played on 25 November–2 December 2009.

Team 1	Agg.	Team 2	1st leg	2nd leg
Trujillanos FC	0-4	Caracas FC	0-1	0-3

NB: Caracas FC qualify to Copa Sudamericana 2010 as cup winners
