= Dudamel =

Dudamel is a surname. Notable people with the surname include:

- Gustavo Dudamel (born 1981), Venezuelan conductor and violinist
- Rafael Dudamel (born 1973), Venezuelan soccer goalkeeper and manager
