= 2011 Copa Venezuela =

The 2011 Copa Venezuela was the 42nd staging of the Copa Venezuela.

Starting on August 31, 2011, the competition concluded on December 7, 2011 with a two leg final, in which AC Mineros won the trophy for the second time with a 2-1 win away and 1-0 win at home over Trujillanos FC.

== First round ==
- 1st legs played on 31 August, 1, 4 and 14 September 2011.
- 2nd legs played on 3, 4, 7 and 21 September 2011.
- Byes:
  - Trujillanos FC (2010 Copa Venezuela champion)
  - Deportivo Táchira FC (2010–11 Venezuelan Primera División champion)

Team 1	Agg.	Team 2	1st leg	2nd leg
Minasoro FC	1–14	AC Mineros	1–5	0–9
Angostura FC	2–2 (a)	Monagas SC	0–0	2–2
Universidad Central de Venezuela	0–5	Caracas FC	0–3	0–2
CA Miranda	3–6	Real Esppor Club	1–4	2–2
UA Aragua	1–5	Deportivo Petare FC	1–1	0–4
SC Guarani	0–1	Aragua FC	0–0	0–1
Arroceros de Calabozo FC	2–6	Tucanes de Amazonas FC	0–1	2–5
Atlético Socopó FC	1–2	Zamora FC	1–1	0–1
Loteria del Tachira FC	4–1	Estudiantes de Mérida FC	1–0	3–1
Ureña SC	1–2	Atlético El Vigía FC	1–1	0–1
Llaneros de Guanare Fútbol Club	4–2	Zulia FC	1–1	3–1
Carabobo FC	3–1	Yaracuyanos FC	1–0	2–1
Portuguesa FC	2–5	Club Deportivo Lara	0–4	2–1
Fundación Cesarger	1–4	Deportivo Anzoátegui SC	0–0	1–4

== Second round ==
- 1st legs played on 5 October 2011.
- 2nd legs played on 8 and 9 October 2011.

Team 1	Agg.	Team 2	1st leg	2nd leg
Deportivo Anzoátegui SC	3–4	Caracas FC	2–1	1–3
Tucanes de Amazonas FC	2–1	Angostura FC	2–1	0–0
Deportivo Petare FC	1–2	Aragua FC	1–1	0–1
AC Mineros	4–4 (a)	Real Esppor Club	2–1	2–3
Llaneros de Guanare Fútbol Club	1–2	Trujillanos FC	1–1	0–1
Club Deportivo Lara	4–4 (a)	Zamora FC	3–2	1–2
Carabobo FC	5–2	Loteria del Tachira FC	2–0	3–2
Deportivo Táchira FC	1–1 (1–3 p)	Atlético El Vigía FC	1–0	0–1

== Quarterfinals ==
- 1st legs played on 26 October 2011.
- 2nd legs played on 2 November 2011.

Team 1	Agg.	Team 2	1st leg	2nd leg
Tucanes de Amazonas FC	1–3	Caracas FC	1–2	0–1
Aragua FC	1–4	AC Mineros	0–1	1–3
Zamora FC	2–5	Trujillanos FC	1–3	1–2
Carabobo FC	1–4	Atlético El Vigía FC	1–0	0–4

== Semifinals ==
- 1st legs played on 9 November 2011.
- 2nd legs played on 13 November 2011.

Team 1	Agg.	Team 2	1st leg	2nd leg
Caracas FC	2–3	AC Mineros	1–2	1–1
Trujillanos FC	4–0	Atlético El Vigía FC	1–0	3–0

== Final ==
- 1st leg played on 30 November 2011.
- 2nd leg played on 7 December 2011.

Team 1	Agg.	Team 2	1st leg	2nd leg
Trujillanos FC	1–3	AC Mineros	1–2	0–1

AC Mineros qualify to Copa Sudamericana 2012.
