= José Manuel Rey =

Venezuelan footballer and manager (born 1975)

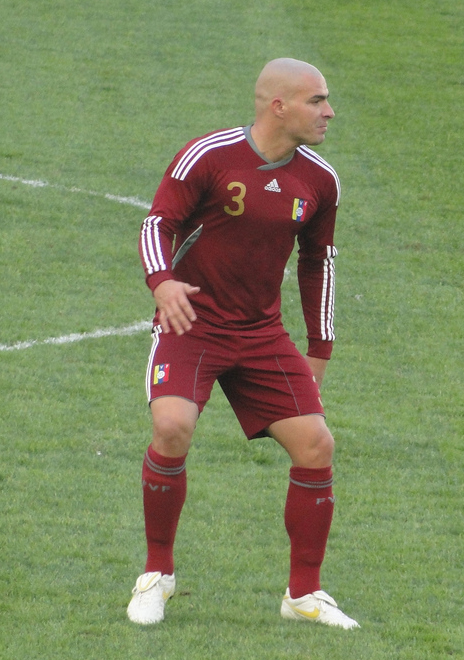
- Rey with Venezuela at the 2011 Copa América

Personal information
- Full name: José Manuel Rey Cortegoso
- Date of birth: 20 May 1975 (age 51)
- Place of birth: Caracas, Venezuela
- Height: 1.83 m (6 ft 0 in)
- Position: Centre-back

Youth career
- 1994–1995: Marítimo

Senior career*
Years	Team	Apps	(Gls)
1995–1996	Deportivo B		
1996–2002	Caracas	103	(24)
1999	→ Emelec (loan)	24	(2)
2003	Emelec	30	(1)
2004–2005	Pontevedra	21	(1)
2006	Atlético Nacional	19	(1)
2006–2010	Caracas	46	(10)
2007–2008	→ AEK Larnaca (loan)	20	(3)
2009	→ Colo-Colo (loan)	8	(0)
2011	Mineros Guayana	11	(1)
2011–2015	Deportivo Lara	100	(7)
Total		382	(50)

International career
1997–2011	Venezuela	115	(10)

Managerial career
- 2015–2016: Venezuela (assistant)
- 2017: Zamora (assistant)
- 2017–2018: Aragua
- 2018–2019: Monagas
- 2020: Zamora
- * Club domestic league appearances and goals

José Manuel Rey Cortegoso (born 20 May 1975) is a Venezuelan former footballer who played as a central defender, currently a manager.

Known as Pokémon and Tetero, and a free kick specialist, he represented mainly Caracas in a 20-year professional career.

Rey was at one time Venezuela's second-most ever capped player, surpassing 100 international appearances. He was part of the squads at six Copa América tournaments.

== Club career ==
During his career, Rey played mainly with Caracas FC, also representing several clubs in Europe and South America: C.S. Marítimo de Venezuela, C.S. Emelec (two spells), Pontevedra CF, Atlético Nacional and AEK Larnaca FC. In 1995, he had a short spell with Deportivo de La Coruña in Spain, but only appeared for the reserves. In 2000 he signed a pre-contract with Dundee FC, but ultimately failed to join to the Scottish side.

In late September 2009, Rey was sent on loan to Colo-Colo in Chile, as a replacement for injured Luis Mena. After an irregular start he established himself in the starting XI, helping them win the Primera División championship.

The loan was to be extended if Colo-Colo qualified to the Copa Libertadores, which eventually happened, but Rey returned to Caracas. In January 2011, after five spells with his main club, the 35-year-old signed for A.C.C.D. Mineros de Guayana.

Rey changed teams again in June 2011, moving to Asociación Civil Deportivo Lara. He retired four years later aged 40, and subsequently worked as manager of Aragua F.C. and Monagas S.C. but also sporting director of Deportivo Lara.

== International career ==
Rey played 115 international matches for the Venezuela national team. His debut came on 8 June 1997, in a 1998 FIFA World Cup qualifier against Bolivia in Valera (1–1 draw).

On 13 October 2007, Rey scored from a spectacular free kick in a 1–0 win over Ecuador in the 2010 World Cup qualifying stages. This signalled Ecuador's first defeat in Quito in six years.

On 6 September 2008, in a 1–0 loss to Peru at the Estadio Monumental in Lima, in another qualifier, Rey became the first player to appear 100 times for Venezuela. He also represented the nation in six Copa América tournaments.

During one year, Rey acted as second in command to Noel Sanvicente at the national side's coaching staff.

=== International goals ===
Goal	Date	Venue	Opponent	Score	Result	Competition
1.	27 January 1999	José Pachencho Romero, Maracaibo, Venezuela	Denmark	1–0	1–1	Friendly
2.	15 June 1999	Pueblo Nuevo, San Cristóbal, Venezuela	Ecuador	2–2	3–2	Friendly
3.	20 June 1999	Misael Delgado, Valencia, Venezuela	Peru	1–0	3–0	Friendly
4.	20 October 2002	Brígido Iriarte, Caracas, Venezuela	Ecuador	1–0	2–0	Friendly
5.	18 November 2003	José Pachencho Romero, Maracaibo, Venezuela	Bolivia	1–1	2–1	2006 World Cup qualification
6.	15 November 2006	Brígido Iriarte, Caracas, Venezuela	Guatemala	2–0	2–1	Friendly
7.	13 October 2007	Olímpico Atahualpa, Quito, Ecuador	Ecuador	0–1	0–1	2010 World Cup qualification
8.	10 June 2009	Polideportivo Cachamay, Puerto Ordaz, Venezuela	Uruguay	0–1	2–2	2010 World Cup qualification
9.	12 August 2009	Giants Stadium, New York City, United States	Colombia	0–1	1–2	Friendly
10.	5 September 2009	Monumental David Arellano, Santiago, Chile	Chile	1–2	2–2	2010 World Cup qualification

== Honours ==
Caracas

- Venezuelan Primera División: 1996–97, 2003–04, 2006–07, 2008–09, 2009–10; Clausura 2004, 2007 and 2009, Apertura 2003

Colo-Colo

- Chilean Primera División: Clausura 2009

Deportivo Lara

- Venezuelan Primera División: 2011–12

Individual

- Caracas FC Footballer of the Year: 2008–09

== See also ==
- List of men's footballers with 100 or more international caps
