= Guillermo Beraza =

Argentine footballer

Personal information
- Full name: Guillermo Fabián Beraza
- Date of birth: October 25, 1975 (age 51)
- Place of birth: Junín, Buenos Aires, Argentina
- Height: 1.77 m (5 ft 10 in)
- Position: Midfielder

Senior career*
Years	Team	Apps	(Gls)
1995–1997	Sarmiento de Junín	29	(7)
1998–1999	Gimnasia CdU	29	(6)
1999–2000	Central Córdoba	13	(2)
2000–2001	Deportes Antofagasta	33	(10)
2001–2002	Unión Española	21	(5)
2002–2003	Deportivo Italchacao	32	(12)
2003–2004	Deportivo Táchira	28	(12)
2004–2008	UA Maracaibo	121	(36)
2008	Deportivo Táchira	14	(5)
2009	Belgrano	0	(0)
2009–2012	Sarmiento de Junín	117	(29)
Total		391	(97)

Managerial career
- Mariano Moreno (assistant)
- * Club domestic league appearances and goals

Guillermo Fabián Beraza (born October 25, 1975, in Junín, Buenos Aires) is an Argentine former footballer who played for clubs in Argentina, Chile and Venezuela. He played as a midfielder.

== Teams ==
- (Argentina) Sarmiento de Junín 1995–1997
- (Argentina) Gimnasia y Esgrima de Concepción del Uruguay 1997–1999
- (Argentina) Central Córdoba de Rosario 1999–2000
- (Chile) Deportes Antofagasta 2000–2001
- (Chile) Unión Española 2001–2002
- (Venezuela) Deportivo Italchacao 2002–2003
- (Venezuela) Deportivo Táchira 2003–2004
- (Venezuela) Unión Atlético Maracaibo 2004–2008
- (Venezuela) Deportivo Táchira 2008
- (Argentina) Belgrano de Córdoba 2009–2010
- (Argentina) Sarmiento de Junín 2010
