= 2003–04 Venezuelan Primera División season =

Venezuelan Primera División
- Season: 2003–04
- Champions: Caracas (7th title)

The 2003–04 season of the Venezuelan Primera División, the top category of Venezuelan football, was played by 10 teams. The national champions were Caracas.

== Torneo Apertura ==
| Pos | Team | Pld | W | D | L | GF | GA | GD | Pts |
|---|---|---|---|---|---|---|---|---|---|
| 1 | Caracas | 18 | 10 | 6 | 2 | 34 | 15 | +19 | 36 |
| 2 | Deportivo Táchira | 18 | 10 | 6 | 2 | 25 | 15 | +10 | 36 |
| 3 | Mineros de Guayana | 18 | 11 | 3 | 4 | 23 | 14 | +9 | 36 |
| 4 | Unión Atlético Maracaibo | 18 | 6 | 5 | 7 | 16 | 12 | +4 | 23 |
| 5 | Deportivo Italchacao | 18 | 6 | 5 | 7 | 22 | 23 | −1 | 23 |
| 6 | Trujillanos | 18 | 5 | 5 | 8 | 14 | 18 | −4 | 20 |
| 7 | Atlético El Vigía | 18 | 4 | 7 | 7 | 18 | 28 | −10 | 19 |
| 8 | Carabobo | 18 | 4 | 6 | 8 | 21 | 26 | −5 | 18 |
| 9 | Monagas | 18 | 4 | 6 | 8 | 17 | 27 | −10 | 18 |
| 10 | Estudiantes de Mérida | 18 | 4 | 3 | 11 | 14 | 26 | −12 | 15 |

== Torneo Clausura ==
| Pos | Team | Pld | W | D | L | GF | GA | GD | Pts |
|---|---|---|---|---|---|---|---|---|---|
| 1 | Caracas | 18 | 13 | 3 | 2 | 36 | 10 | +26 | 42 |
| 2 | Deportivo Táchira | 18 | 10 | 4 | 4 | 35 | 24 | +11 | 34 |
| 3 | Carabobo | 18 | 10 | 2 | 6 | 25 | 19 | +6 | 32 |
| 4 | Mineros de Guayana | 18 | 6 | 6 | 6 | 23 | 21 | +2 | 24 |
| 5 | Monagas | 18 | 5 | 8 | 5 | 16 | 14 | +2 | 23 |
| 6 | Estudiantes de Mérida | 18 | 6 | 5 | 7 | 28 | 32 | −4 | 23 |
| 7 | Deportivo Italchacao | 18 | 5 | 5 | 8 | 19 | 27 | −8 | 20 |
| 8 | Trujillanos | 18 | 2 | 12 | 4 | 11 | 15 | −4 | 18 |
| 9 | Unión Atlético Maracaibo | 18 | 3 | 8 | 7 | 17 | 24 | −7 | 17 |
| 10 | Atlético El Vigía | 18 | 1 | 5 | 12 | 13 | 37 | −24 | 8 |

== Promotion/relegation playoff ==
May 15, 2004

| Deportivo Anzoátegui | 0–2 | Estudiantes de Mérida |

May 23, 2004

| Estudiantes de Mérida | 1–1 | Deportivo Anzoátegui |
