= Cristian Cásseres =

Venezuelan footballer (born 1977)

Personal information
- Full name: Cristian Alfonso Cásseres
- Date of birth: 29 June 1977 (age 49)
- Place of birth: Caracas, Venezuela
- Height: 1.71 m (5 ft 7 in)
- Position: Striker

Senior career*
Years	Team	Apps	(Gls)
1998–2003	ItalChacao		
1999–2000	CF Atlas	14	(7)
2001–2001	La Piedad	20	(3)
2002	Bachilleres	11	(3)
2004	CF Atlas	3	(0)
2005–2007	Maracaibo	35	(14)
2008–2010	Deportivo Italia	75	(32)
2010–2011	Real Esppor	36	(5)
2011–2012	Deportivo Táchira	31	(9)
2012–2014	Atlético Venezuela	44	(7)
2014	Metropolitanos FC	8	(2)
2015–2017	Atlántico FC	26	(4)
2017–2018	Metropolitanos FC	7	(0)

International career
1999–2008	Venezuela	28	(2)
- * Club domestic league appearances and goals

Cristian Alfonso Cásseres (born 29 June 1977) is a Venezuelan former professional footballer who played as a striker. He made a total number of 28 appearances (two goals) for the Venezuela national team between 1999 and 2008. Cásseres started his professional career at Estudiantes de Mérida in 1996. He also played in Mexico.
