= Jorge Rojas (Venezuelan footballer) =

Venezuelan footballer (born 1977)

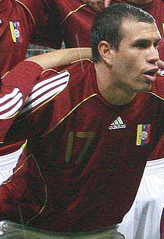
- Rojas with Venezuela in 2008

Personal information
- Full name: Jorge Alberto Rojas Méndez
- Date of birth: January 10, 1977 (age 49)
- Place of birth: Mérida, Venezuela
- Height: 1.77 m (5 ft 10 in)
- Positions: Left winger; left back

Youth career
- 1994: Universidad de Los Andes
- 1995: Unicol
- 1996: Mineros de Guayana
- 1997: Boca Juniors

Senior career*
Years	Team	Apps	(Gls)
1998–1999	Estudiantes Mérida		
1999	Universidad de Los Andes		
2000–2002	Caracas FC	27	(7)
2003	Emelec	39	(2)
2004	Caracas FC	18	(4)
2004–2006	Atlético Nacional	52	(3)
2006–2007	Caracas FC	49	(10)
2007	América de Cali	22	(4)
2008	UA Maracaibo	21	(3)
2008–2009	New York Red Bulls	32	(2)
2010–2011	Deportivo Táchira	12	(3)
2011–2013	Mineros de Guayana	85	(15)
2013	Aragua	21	(1)
2014	Metropolitanos	17	(7)
2015–2017	Deportivo Táchira	93	(20)
2018	ULA		
2018–2019	Metropolitanos	31	(7)
2019	Yaracuy FC		

International career
1999–2009	Venezuela	91	(3)
- * Club domestic league appearances and goals as of 16:59, 30 November 2019 (UTC)

Jorge Alberto Rojas Méndez (born January 10, 1977, in Mérida) is a Venezuelan former footballer.

== Career ==
=== Club ===
After playing for several small clubs in Venezuela, Rojas began to establish himself as one of the nations top players while at Caracas FC. Following his successful first stint at Caracas, which included two league titles, he joined Ecuadorean power Emelec in 2003. That season, he was selected as the top foreign player in the league. Rojas than briefly returned to Caracas before joining Colombian club Atlético Nacional. While at Nacional Rojas helped the club to the 2005 Apertura Championship, and was considered one of the top players in the league.

Following his successful stint with Nacional, Rojas returned for his third stint with Caracas FC guiding the club to back to back league titles in 2006 and 2007. At the conclusion of the 2007 campaign he returned to Colombia to play for América de Cali, while at Cali he appeared in 22 matches, notching 4 goals (3 from the penalty spot). Following the Colombian league season, Rojas was sold to Unión Atlético Maracaibo. He scored his first goal with Maracaibo in a 1-2 defeat to his former club Caracas FC. While at Maracaibo, Rojas participated in a famous 1-1 draw against Boca Juniors in the 2008 Copa Libertadores. He also led Maracaibo to the final of the Copa de Venezuela where his club would lose the series to Aragua Fútbol Club on away goals.

Rojas signed with New York Red Bulls of Major League Soccer in July 2008. He had two assists in his first game for the club against the Los Angeles Galaxy on July 19, 2008. He appeared in 11 regular season matches for New York, registering 5 assists. Following the Major League Soccer season it appeared that Rojas would go loan to Mineros de Guayana during the MLS off-season, however the move never materialized. In his next season with New York Red Bulls he would score two goals. But this form he produced would only come once. At the end of the season he was cut loose and returned to Venezuela to play for Deportivo Táchira.

He then later also played for Mineros de Guayana, Aragua and Metropolitanos.

On 27 December 2019, 42-year old Rojas announced his retirement from football.

=== International ===
Rojas started his career with the Venezuela National Team at the age of 14, when he joined the U-15 squad, coached by Ratomir Djukovic and then by Augusto Viso. Rojas went on to play at the Bolivarian Games and then to the South American Games in Colombia in 1993. Rojas continue through all the Natl Youth Teams until he finally was called up to the Senior Team. Rojas has earned 90 caps for the Venezuela national team, making him the second most capped player in the history of Venezuelan international football as of April 2009.

He made his international debut on January 27, 1999, in a friendly against Denmark. The match ended 1–1 and was played at Estadio José Pachencho Romero in Maracaibo.

==== International goals ====
#	Date	Venue	Opponent	Score	Result	Competition
1.	18 August 2004	Estadio de Gran Canaria, Las Palmas, Spain	Spain	1–1	3-2	Friendly
2.	3 February 2008	Monumental de Maturín, Maturín, Venezuela	Haiti	1–0	1-0	Friendly
3.	20 August 2008	José Antonio Anzoátegui, Puerto La Cruz, Venezuela	Syria	3–0	4-1	Friendly
Correct as of 7 October 2015

== Honors ==
Universidad de Los Andes

- Segunda División Venezolana: 1994–95

Caracas

- Primera División Venezolana: 2000–01, 2002–03, 2005–06, 2006–07
- Copa de Venezuela: 2001

Atlético Nacional

- Copa Mustang: 2005-I

Unión Atlético Maracaibo

- Copa de Venezuela runner-up: 2008

New York Red Bulls

- MLS Cup runner-up: 2008

Deportivo Táchira

- Primera División Venezolana: 2010–11

== Statistics ==
League	Appearances	Goals
Primera División Venezolana	106	23
Fútbol Profesional Colombiano	74	7
Campeonato Ecuatoriano de Fútbol	39	2
Copa Libertadores	29	3
Copa de Venezuela	6	2
Major League Soccer	31	2
US Open Cup	1	2
