= Atlético Orinoco =

- Full name: Atlético Orinoco Fútbol Club
- Founded: 2005
- Ground: Polideportivo Venalum; Ciudad Guayana, Venezuela
- Capacity: 5,000
- Manager: Del Valle Rojas
- League: Venezuelan Segunda División
Home colours	Away colours

Atlético Orinoco is a Venezuelan football club from Ciudad Guayana. It was founded in 2005 and currently plays in the Venezuelan Segunda División.
