= Polideportivo Cachamay =

Sports venue in Venezuela

Coordinates: 8°18′45″N 62°41′48″W

Estadio Cachamay
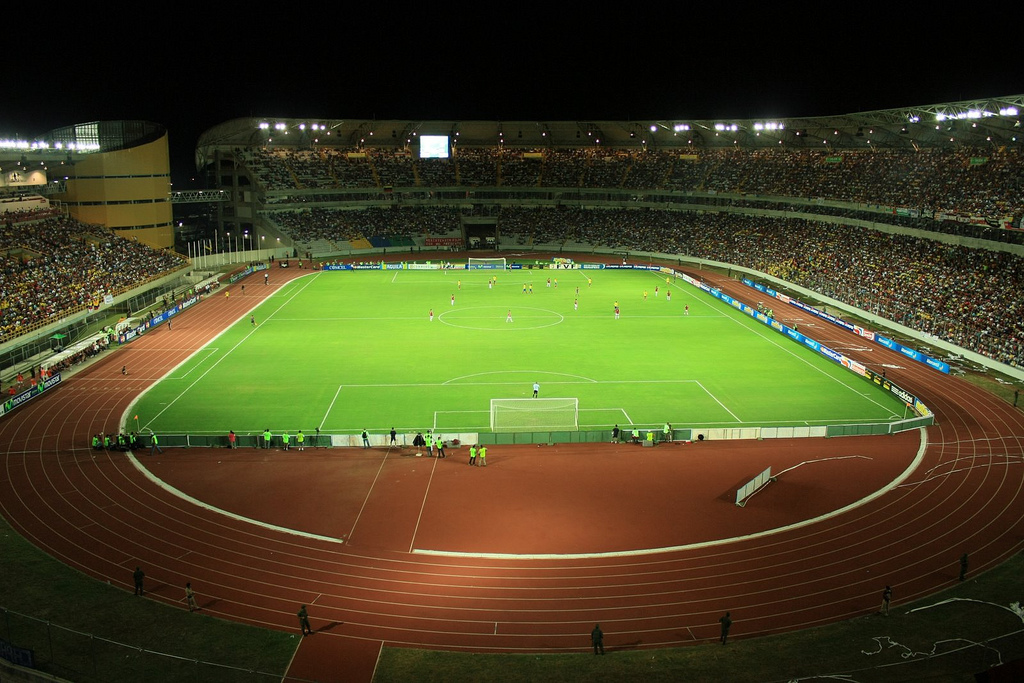
- Interactive map of Estadio Cachamay
- Full name: Centro Total de Entretenimiento Cachamay
- Former names: Estadio Gino Scaringella (1980-1990); Polideportivo Cachamay (1990-2007)
- Location: Ciudad Guayana, Venezuela
- Capacity: 41,600 (seating only)

Construction
- Built: 1980
- Opened: 1980
- Renovated: 1990, 2007
- Cost: US$74.4 million

Tenants
- Mineros de Guayana Minervén de Bolívar; Venezuela national football team

The Estadio Cachamay is part of the Centro Total de Entretenimiento Cachamay (English: The Total Entertainment Center of Cachamay). It is a multipurpose stadium located on Avenida Guayana in Puerto Ordaz (Part of Ciudad Guayana) Bolivar State, Venezuela. The old stadium was opened in 1980 and subjected to an expansion, modernization and remodeling over the years 1990 and 2006–2007, which involved the demolition of some parts and redesign of its structure to point to double its capacity before 2006, being one of the 9 host stadiums of the 2007 Copa América, when it reopened as Cachamay CTE. It is set in grounds with beautiful natural landscapes, surrounded by the mighty river Caroni and waterfalls Cachamay Park. The sports center is managed by the Cachamay Foundation, with home court advantage for soccer teams AC Mineros de Guayana and AC Minervén FC Bolivar. The CTE is known popularly as Cachamay Stadium.

== History ==
The stadium was initially inaugurated in 1980 under the name of Estadio Gino Scaringella, Named in memory of a referee of Italian descent who lost his life refereeing amateur football matches on the stadium's land years before it was built. Seeing the need to build a place where sports could be practiced properly in the region, Corporación Venezolana de Guayana began in 1988 the construction of a sports center, in the same zone of the stadium.

It was reopened in 1990 with a upgraded capacity of 14,000 spectators. It was renamed as Polideportivo Cachamay by the press in the early days of its foundation, due to its proximity to the Cachamay Park.

The stadium was chosen as of the venues for 2007 Copa América, which led to the necessity of expanding and remodeling the stadium. Because of this, the Corporacion Venezolana de Guayana handed over the stadium to the government of the State of Bolivar, through a loan of 25 years.

The company responsible for the remodeling of the Polideportivo Cachamay was the Mexican constructor ICA, responsible for having made more than 20 stadiums Mexico and Latin America, which includes the famous Estadio Azteca. The work was started in mid-April 2006, and consisted of the demolition of the old popular platform, installation of new platforms and boxes, rebuilding the main stand, administrative offices, press and backstage areas, green areas surrounding maintenance and building plazas, access and parking. The materials used for the reconstruction were reinforced concrete and metal structures. A vinyl-covered plastic canvas was used for the stadium's roof.

Despite the magnitude of the work, the original grass did not suffer any damages, it just received some enhancements to ensure quality.

After the extension and renovation work was finished, the stadium was inaugurated on June 22, 2007 under the name of Centro Total de Entretenimiento Cachamay (Cachamay Total Entertainment Center). The ceremony included an unprecedented show of fireworks, lights, presentations of artists, the Orquesta Sinfónica de Ciudad Guayana and bands alluding to the traditions, music and adjective of the Guyanese people. Next, the Bolivar State Government handed over the enclosure to the Cachamay Foundation, with the purpose of ensuring and guaranteeing the sustainability of the complex.

The first goal scored after its reopening was held on June 27, 2007, in a match between the football teams of Ecuador and Chile during the 2007 Copa América. The goal was scored by Ecuadorian midfielder Luis Antonio Valencia on the 16th minute of the first half.

== Facilities ==
By virtue of being one of the sub-headquarters of the Copa América 2007, The Venezuelan government, through the Governor of Bolivar State, Corporacion Venezolana de Guayana (CVG) and the National Sports Institute (IND), invested over 220 billion Bolivars for its expansion and renovation, becoming a leading sports scene venue. Its sports facilities meet all international football standards for FIFA and CONMEBOL.

=== Capacity ===
- Total Capacity: 41,600 spectators.
- Main Grandstand: 4,125 spectators, discriminated against in 3553 and 572 seats leather seats.
- Tribuna Popular: 37,473 spectators, divided into 3 sections, Level A: 18,731 chairs, Level B and Level C seats 9523: 9219 respectively.
- Authorities Stand: 448 people. It has leather seats, air conditioning, wireless Internet via WIFI, Toilets, meeting room and private elevator. It is located in the Main Grandstand.
- General Boxes: 154 boxes, with capacities from 9 to 24 people, have preferential access and parking, seating, private bathrooms, wooden floors, sound, air conditioning and panoramic windows sliding. They are located in central People's Tribune.

=== Visits ===
- Circulation Cylinders: 2 circular blocks access of 10,703 m^{2}, with an elevator for 25 people. They serve to communicate the Main Grandstand with the rest of the stadium.
- Ramps: 8 to ground floor level of 8 feet wide, with capacity for 15 people.
- Stories: Orinoco, Ground floor level, the location of the commercial area; Caroni, Is accessed from the Tribune A; CauraProvides access to the area of General Boxes located in the middle sector and Paragua, With which it enters the upper section of the stadium bleachers B and C. The names of the levels of the stadium are in honor of the largest rivers in the state of Bolivar.
- Parking: 5 parks covering an area of 186,233 m^{2}, with capacity for approximately 5,000 vehicles. Parking A is for media use, the parking lots B, C, D and E are intended for use by the general public.

=== Sports facilities ===
The sports center has a main field of 105 x 70 m, and an alternating field called Cachamaicito 80×45 m. The main engram is bordered by a track Athletic vulcanized rubber synthetic 8 lane, with the support of the IAAF for high-level international competitions.[4] Additionally, it has indoor areas for warming up the players, an indoor gymnasium and tennis to practice volleyball, basketball and Softball.

=== Overview of the People's Tribune Technology ===
The stadium has a surround sound system and security that encompasses all facilities, and a lighting system type Sand 200 210 lampsW intensity each, still above the requirements of FIFA for international matches nightly broadcasts. In the north and southeast of the People's Court are located color screen high resolution of 42 m^{2}, similar to those used in some stages of Europe. The lonaria located on the roof of the sports complex is illuminated by a light system, which changes color during night games.

=== Stays ===
The sports complex has 4 dressing rooms with massage area, changing rooms, showers and toilets, two dressing room work with coaches, two dressing rooms for referees, district medical services, nursing, drug-testing room, as well as the offices administrative office for the CONMEBOL and an auditorium with 110 seats.

The stadium's press room supports 170 jobs with an Internet connection and wireless as well as an interview room for 40 journalists, 54 radio booths, 10 booths for television, 300 jobs with folding tables in the Main Grandstand, 2 rooms with direct access photojournalists into the field and a recreation room for 140 journalists.

=== Commercial areas ===
The CTE Cachamay has over 140 stores, located in the Main Grandstand and People, from 20 m^{2} to 100 m^{2} and covering an approximate area of 5,700 m^{2}. Additionally, it has 4 cinemas, with a capacity of 140 persons each.

== Events ==
=== Copa América Venezuela 2007 ===
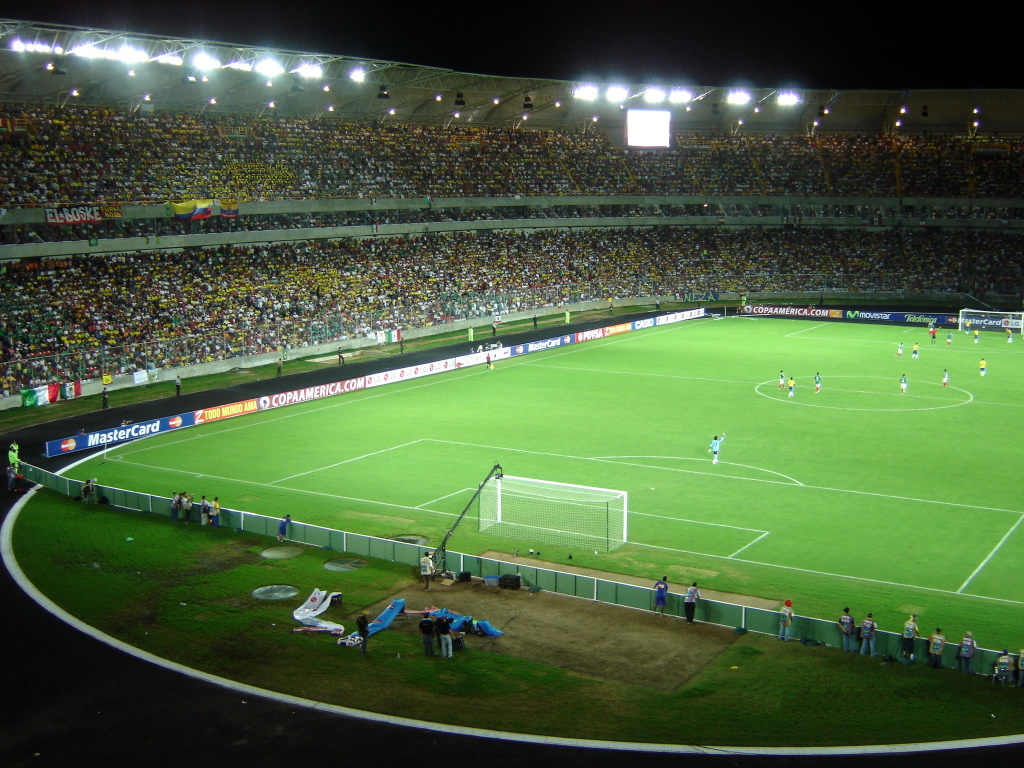

The CTE Cachamay was one of the 9 sub-venues of the Copa América Venezuela 2007, hosting first-round games in Group B (Brazil, Mexico, Chile and Ecuador) Reliza on June 27, 2007, and one semifinal, played between Argentina and Mexico, Held on July 11, 2007.

Date	Time(EDT)	Team #1	Res.	Team #2	Round
2007-06-27	18.30	Ecuador	2-3	Chile	Group B
2007-06-27	20.50	Brazil	0-2	Mexico	Group B
2007-07-11	20.50	Mexico	0-3	Argentina	Semi Final

== Matches of the Venezuela National Team ==
=== Friendly games ===
On September 9, 2007, a friendly soccer match between Venezuela and Paraguay took place. In preparation for the 2010 FIFA World Cup qualification, with a notable Venezuelan victory combined with a score of 3:2, that rallied after trailing 0:2. Remarkably, the selection of Venezuela was 14 years without playing a competitive game at the stadium.

September 9, 2007
19:00

Venezuela	3 – 2	Paraguay
Arismendi 66'; Maldonado 75'; Guerra 90'		Riveros 39', 64'

Polideportivo Cachamay, Puerto Ordaz
Attendance: 35,000
Referee: Carlos López (Colombia)

=== World Cup qualification ===
March 31, 2009

Venezuela	2 – 0	Colombia
Miku 77'; Arango 81'

Polideportivo Cachamay, Puerto Ordaz
Attendance: 35,000
Referee: Pablo Pozo (Chile)

June 10, 2009

Venezuela	2 – 2	Uruguay
Maldonado 9'; Rey 81'		Suárez 60'; Forlán 72'

Polideportivo Cachamay, Puerto Ordaz
Attendance: 42,000
Referee: Salvio Fagundes (Brazil)

October 10, 2009

Venezuela	1 – 2	Paraguay
Rondón 85'		Cabañas 56'; Cardozo 79'

Polideportivo Cachamay, Puerto Ordaz
Attendance: 42,000
Referee: Carlos Chandia (Chile)

=== Sports Interempresas ===
On campus facilities are held the opening ceremony, certain sports (mostly athletic competition) and closure of theSportsInterempresas Guiana, annual sports tournament in healthy competition that links to companies that make life in Bolivar State.

=== II All-Star Football ===
On May 7, 2008 was made the Second All-Star Football Correo del Caroni comparison that included the participation of the best players Creole and foreigners who give life to soccer, Venezuela. For the selection of representatives of each eleventh, we used a voting system through the Internet. The event ended with a score of 7:2, to the team of the Creoles.

In the middle of the event, a tribute to him Ridi Noel "Chita" Sanvicente, due to their outstanding performances as an ex-player of Minerva and his achievements as coach.

Before the implementation of the party, met in a friendly match players Mineros de Guayana legends and Minervén of Callao, collation ended with a score of 0:5 in favor of Minerva.

=== Concerts ===
The stadium has hosted the following musical events:

- December 9, 2007 Concert LazyTown.
- July 19, 2008 Concert Olga Tañón and Wisin & Yandel.
- August 22, 2008: Concert of Jesus Adrian Romero and Manny Montes.
- October 4, 2008: Concert by Oscar D'León and RBD World Tour Empezar Desde Cero.
- November 8, 2008: Concert by you and me.
- 13 December 2008: Concert by Daddy Yankee and Tito El Bambino.
- July 25, 2009: Concert of Mobile
