= Daniel Arismendi =

Venezuelan footballer (born 1982)

Personal information
- Full name: Daniel Enrique Arismendi Marchán
- Date of birth: 4 July 1982 (age 44)
- Place of birth: Cumaná, Venezuela
- Height: 1.80 m (5 ft 11 in)
- Position: Striker

Team information
- Current team: OCSS Hunters Creek

Senior career*
Years	Team	Apps	(Gls)
2004	Mineros de Guayana	16	(3)
2004–2008	UA Maracaibo	48	(20)
2005	→ Italmaracaibo (loan)	19	(4)
2006	→ Carabobo (loan)	21	(14)
2008	→ Atlante (loan)	11	(3)
2009–2010	Deportivo Táchira	30	(12)
2010–2012	Anzoátegui	60	(32)
2012–2013	Antofagasta	30	(12)
2013	Juan Aurich	15	(4)
2013–2014	Zulia	14	(5)
2014–2015	Carabobo	22	(2)
2015	Deportes Concepción	11	(0)
2016	Atlético Venezuela	27	(7)
2019–2020	Celta USA		
2020-	OCSS Hunters Creek		

International career^{‡}
2006–2011	Venezuela	30	(10)
- * Club domestic league appearances and goals as of 8 July 2020 ‡ National team caps and goals as of 13 December 2011

Daniel Enrique Arismendi Marchán (Spanish pronunciation: [daˈnjel arisˈmendi], born 4 July 1982) is a Venezuelan footballer who coaches and plays as a striker for Orlando City Soccer School Hunters Creek in the United Premier Soccer League.

== Club career ==
According to English press, Arismendi was pursued by Premier League club Wigan Athletic and has been monitored by clubs in Mexico for some time.

== International career ==
Arismendi scored two goals for his country in a 2010 FIFA World Cup qualifier against Bolivia in Maracaibo.

Also participated in the 2007 Copa América in Venezuela, where he was called by Richard Páez and reached the second round, finishing sixth in the tournament. With the new coach Cesar Farías, who arrived in 2008 Arismendi had no continuity with Richard if he had.

In 2020, Arismendi is playing for United Premier Soccer League club Celta USA. He scored the game-winning goal in a 1-0 inter-club derby win against Celta Gunners.

=== International goals ===
Goal	Date	Venue	Opponent	Score	Result	Competition
1.	September 29, 2006	José Pachencho Romero, Maracaibo, Venezuela	Uruguay	1–0	1-0	Friendly
2.	February 7, 2007	José Pachencho Romero, Maracaibo, Venezuela	Sweden	2–0	2-0	Friendly
3.	February 28, 2007	Qualcomm Stadium, San Diego, United States	Mexico	3–1	3-1	Friendly
4.	May 25, 2007	Metropolitano de Mérida, Mérida, Venezuela	Honduras	2–0	2-1	Friendly
5.	June 30, 2007	Pueblo Nuevo, San Cristóbal, Venezuela	Peru	2–0	2-0	2007 Copa América
6.	November 20, 2007	Pueblo Nuevo, San Cristóbal, Venezuela	Bolivia	1–1	5-3	2010 FIFA World Cup qualification
7.	November 20, 2007	Pueblo Nuevo, San Cristóbal, Venezuela	Bolivia	2–2	5-3	2010 FIFA World Cup qualification
8.	September 8, 2007	Polideportivo Cachamay, Puerto Ordaz, Venezuela	Paraguay	1–2	3-2	Friendly
9.	June 9, 2008	Ergilio Hato, Willemstad, Netherlands Antilles	Netherlands Antilles	0–1	0-1	Friendly
10.	March 16, 2011	Estadio del Bicentenario, San Juan, Argentina	Argentina	1–1	4-1	Friendly
11.*	June 11, 2011	Sam Boyd Stadium, Las Vegas, United States	Mexico	0–2	0-3	Unofficial Friendly
