= Guaros F.C. =

- Full name: Guaros Fútbol Club
- Nickname: Rojinegro (The Red-and-Black)
- Founded: 2006; 20 years ago
- Dissolved: 2009; 17 years ago
- Ground: Estadio Farid Richa; Barquisimeto
- Capacity: 12,480
- League: Venezuelan Primera División

Guaros Fútbol Club was a Venezuelan professional football club based in Barquisimeto. The club played from 2006 to 2009 in the Venezuelan Primera División.
