= Estadio José Antonio Anzoátegui =

Venezuelan football stadium

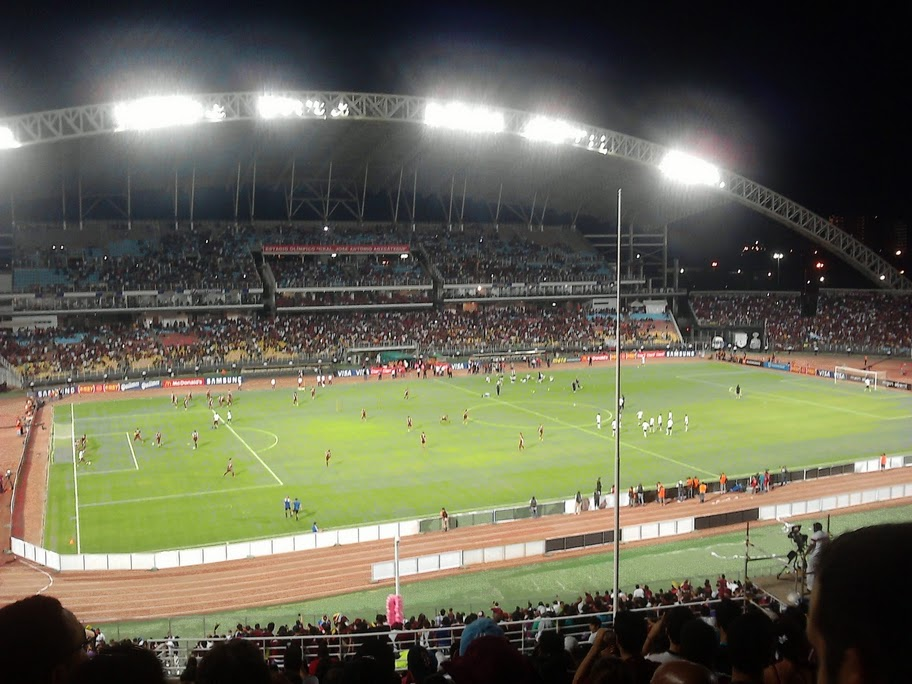
- Interactive map of Estadio José Antonio Anzoátegui
- Full name: Estadio Olímpico General José Antonio Anzoátegui
- Former names: Complejo Polideportivo Luis Ramos
- Location: Puerto la Cruz, Venezuela
- Coordinates: 10°10′48.30″N 64°39′22.02″W
- Capacity: 37,485 (seating only)

Construction
- Built: 1964–1965
- Opened: December 8, 1965
- Renovated: 2007
- Cost: US$60.4 million

Tenant
- Anzoátegui F.C.

The Estadio Olímpico General José Antonio Anzoátegui before called Estadio Luis Ramos, is a stadium located in the Venezuelan city of Puerto la Cruz, in the state of Anzoátegui. It was opened on December 8, 1965, by the former president of Venezuela, Raúl Leoni.

== Overview ==
The old stadium that occupied the area was demolished and construction for a new stadium started from scratch. A modern stadium was needed to be a venue for the Copa America 2007 soccer tournament. The stadium has a spectator capacity of 37,485 with multiple levels, a closed circuit security system, two police stations inside the stadium, four locker rooms, four temporal offices, an office for the Venezuelan Federation of football and another one for FIFA, an anti-doping room, two changing rooms for athletes, a gym, an auditorium for 200 people, eight food shops, a central control station, a nursery, a roof for the locations of television cameras, restaurant and a VIP Bar, four elevators and 24 transmission cabins.

In July 2006, the Legislative branch of Anzoátegui approved 25 hundred million bolivares to speed up the works of the stadium in which have been invested 100 million bolivares.

After the Copa América 2007 finished, the stadium started works on the final touches of the stadium. In March 2008, the roof was finally finished and the stadium was complete.

== 2007 Copa América ==
The stadium was one of the venues for the 2007 Copa América. The following tournament matches were played at the stadium:

Date	Time (EDT)	Team #1	Res.	Team #2	Round
4 July 2007	18:30	Mexico	0–0	Chile	Group B
4 July 2007	20:45	Brazil	1–0	Ecuador	Group B
7 July 2007	20:50	Chile	1–6	Brazil	Quarter-finals

== Concerts ==
The following is an incomplete list of known foreign artists who have given concerts in the stadium:

Date	Country	Artist	Tour
July 18, 2008	Puerto Rico	Wisin & Yandel	Los Extraterrestres World Tour
November 6, 2011	Venezuela	Franco de Vita	Tour Mira Más Allá
March 7, 2012	Mexico	Maná	Drama y Luz World Tour
July 4, 2012	Guatemala	Ricardo Arjona	Metamorfosis World Tour
June 13, 2012	USA	Romeo Santos	Formula, Vol. 1 World Tour
