= Unión Lara S.C. =

Unión Lara SC
- Full name: Unión Lara Sport Club
- Nickname(s): El equipo del Barrio; La máquina Roja
- Founded: 1999; 26 years ago
- Ground: Estadio Farid Richa; Barquisimeto, Venezuela
- Capacity: 12,480
- Chairman: Wilfredo Sanchez
- Manager: Jorge Aguero
- League: Tercera División Venezolana
Home colours	Away colours

Unión Lara Sports Club (Originally Unión Lara Fútbol Club) is a Venezuelan football team based in Barquisimeto, Lara State. Founded in 1999, they currently play in the Venezuelan Third Division, holding home games at the Farid Richa Stadium, with a capacity of 12,480 people.

== History ==
Union Lara FC made its debut in the Copa República Bolivariana de Venezuela in 2000, facing Caracas Fútbol Club.

The club competed in the Venezuelan Second Division 2003/04 season, clinching the 'Apertura Tournament' championship, and reaching the final against Union Deportivo Marítimo. Although they lost in regular time after a penalty shootout (4–1), the global result ended in a 2–2 draw, allowing them to stay in the silver category of Venezuelan football for another season.

In the 2004–2005 season, the team earned 35 points in 20 games in the 'Apertura Tournament' and secured a 2nd-place finish with 42 points in the ‘Closing Tournament.’ They were just 5 points behind the season's champion, Aragua Fútbol Club. This performance meant another season in the Second Division of Venezuela.

The 2005/06 season in the Second Venezuelan Division commenced with the '2005 Apertura Tournament,' where Unión Lara competed in the Central-Eastern Group. The club finished 4th with 25 points, comprising 6 wins, 7 draws, and a single defeat during the semester. Their performance enabled them to advance to the 'Closing Tournament 2006,' where they contended for promotion to the First Division of Venezuela. In the 'Closing Tournament 2006,' "The Neighborhood Team" came close to promotion, securing a third-place finish with 37 points, only one point behind the promoted Portuguesa Fútbol Club and Zamora Fútbol Club.

Before the beginning of the Copa América 2007, the FVF decided to expand both the First Division of Venezuela and the Second Division of Venezuela. As a result, the Union Lara FC played in the top category for the 2007–2008 season. The First Venezuelan Division 2007/08 started with the 'Opening Apertura 2007', a tournament national scope, where Union Lara achieved 3 victories throughout the semester and ended with 14 points, placing second to last and surpassing Red Star FC. In the 'Closing Tournament 2008,' a similar result occurred, with the club placing second to last with 14 points and a total of 9 losses in the entire tournament. It placed last in the accumulated table of the season and was demoted to the Second Division of Venezuela for the following season.

The Second Venezuelan Division 2008/09 started with the 'Opening Apertura 2008'. The Union Lara FC finished 11th in this tournament, achieving a total of 18 points in 15 matches. For the 'Clausura 2009', the club achieved a total of 5 wins and add 17 points, placing 11th once more. In the accumulated table of the season the club occupied the 10th place.

For the Second Venezuelan Division 2009/10 three Larense teams: Unión Lara FC, Lara FC Police, and UCLA FC joined to form the revival of Lara Fútbol Club. The Lara Fútbol Club was a team with a long history as the first non-capital national champion in 1965. It was also the first Larense champion in the top category and participated in the Copa Libertadores of 1966. The Lara Fútbol Club remained in the silver category and played in the Ascent Tournament in the Second Venezuelan Division 2011/12 before economic problems led to its dissolution. As the reborn Lara Fútbol Club played in the Segunda División Venezolana 2009/10 with the quota of Lara FC Police, the quota left by Unión Lara was occupied by the Club Deportivo San Antonio, the Larense image disappeared due to the aforementioned merger.

=== Rebirth of the Union ===
For the 2012–2013 Tournament and after many rumors, the Lara Union squad was reborn, now with the Sports Club name, which participates in the Third Division of Venezuela. The 2012–2013 season of the Third Division (Third Venezuelan Division 2012/13) began with the '2012 Apertura Tournament', where the Larense squad was in Central Group II, ending in 3rd with a total of 11 points, 3 wins, 2 draws, and 3 losses, having to play for staying in the category in the following semester of the season. The next tournament of the season was the 'Clausura 2013' where the teams that did not manage to qualify for the '2013 Promotion and Permanence Tournament' and those teams and institutions that wish to enter the category participate commonly called "aspirants". The team was part of the Central-Western Group, where they finished last in the group with only 6 points and only one victory in the entire semester.

For the Third Venezuelan Division 2013/14, Lara Union was part of the Central Group II of the 'Opening 2013', where it managed to add a total of 13 units, classifying the next tournament of the season as one of the best third places. The club took part in the Central Group of the 'Tournament of Promotion and Permanence 2014', a tight group that was decided on the last day, where the Larense team managed to finish in second place with 23 units and a total of 7 victories throughout the semester, thus achieving promotion to the Second Division of Venezuela for the following season.

=== Name changes ===
Year	Name
1999	Unión Lara Fútbol Club
2012	Unión Lara Sport Club

== Club Information ==
- 'Seasons in 1st: 1 (07-08)
- 'Seasons in 2nd: 5 (03-04, 04-05, 05-06, 06-07, 08-09)
- 'Seasons in 3rd: 3 (12–13, 13–14, 14–15, 15–16)

== Stadium ==
The Farid Richa Stadium is a football stadium located in the capital city of Lara State, Barquisimeto, in the center of Venezuela, it is the headquarters of the local football team of the first division 'Unión Lara Sports Club' and two other teams (Unión Deportiva Lara and Lara Fútbol Club Police), was baptized with that name in homage to a prominent player of origin Lebanese Farid Richa, was reopened in 2001, and has a capacity of approximately 12,480 spectators.

== Links ==
- Unofficial website
- Unión Lara Sport Club on Twitter
