= Estrella Roja F.C. =

Venezuelan football club

Estrella Roja
- Full name: Estrella Roja Fútbol Club
- Nicknames: Equipo Militar, Los Cívico-Militares
- Founded: 2004
- Dissolved: 2014
- Ground: Estadio Brígido Iriarte; Caracas, Venezuela
- Capacity: 15,000
- Chairman: Marisol Centeno de Mora
- Manager: Daniel Lanata
- Coach: Elio Blanco
- League: Primera División Venezolana
- Apertura 2008: 18th
Home colours

Estrella Roja Fútbol Club (commonly known called Estrella Roja) was a professional football club promoted to the Venezuelan league in 2007, based in Caracas.

== Squad ==
Note: Flags indicate national team as defined under FIFA eligibility rules; some limited exceptions apply. Players may hold more than one non-FIFA nationality.

No.	Pos.	Nation	Player
?	GK	VEN	Mauricio Lazzaro
?	DF	VEN	Carlos Moreno Oliver
?	DF	VEN	Pedro Millán
?	DF	VEN	Elio Blanco
?	MF	VEN	Darwin Peralta

No.	Pos.	Nation	Player
?	FW	VEN	Pavel Mora
?	FW	VEN	Omar Mora
?	FW	VEN	Rafael Martínez
?	FW	VEN	Cesar Rojas Hernandez
