= Atlético El Vigía F.C. =

Venezuelan football club

Atlético El Vigía
- Full name: Fundación Atlético El Vigía Fútbol Club
- Nickname: Los Plataneros
- Founded: October 31, 1987 (38 years ago)
- Ground: Estadio Ramón "Gato" Hernández; El Vigía, Venezuela
- Capacity: 12,785
- Chairman: Nelson Contreras
- Manager: Ramon Hernandez
- League: Primera División Venezolana
- 2009–2010: Copa Movilnet, 9th
Home colours	Away colours

Atlético El Vigía Fútbol Club (usually called Atlético El Vigía) is a Venezuelan professional football club based in El Vigía, Mérida State.

== Titles ==
- Primera División Venezolana: 0

Amateur Era (0):
Professional Era (0):

- Segunda División Venezolana: 3

1993, 2003, 2007

- Segunda División B Venezolana: 0
- Tercera División Venezolana: 0
- Copa de Venezuela: 0

== Current first team squad ==
Lider; Jugadores de El Vigia

Note: Flags indicate national team as defined under FIFA eligibility rules; some limited exceptions apply. Players may hold more than one non-FIFA nationality.

No.	Pos.	Nation	Player
—	GK	VEN	Adrián Rodríguez
—	GK	VEN	Víctor Rangel
—	DF	VEN	Néstor Acosta
—	DF	VEN	Alveiro Aislant
—	DF	VEN	Janner Aislant
—	DF	COL	Elkin Amador
—	DF	VEN	Ever Avendaño
—	DF	VEN	Raúl Carmona
—	DF	VEN	Emilio Guerrero
—	DF	VEN	Alonso Lopez
—	DF	VEN	José Puente
—	MF	VEN	José Acosta
—	MF	COL	Wilinton Arrieta

No.	Pos.	Nation	Player
—	MF	VEN	Jorge Guerra
—	MF	VEN	Carlos Guerra
—	MF	VEN	Hader Hurtado
—	MF	COL	Fabián Muñoz
—	MF	COL	Orlando Rengifo
—	MF	VEN	Wislintos Rentería
—	MF	VEN	William Vargas
—	FW	COL	Juan Caro
—	FW	VEN	Alfredo Contreras
—	FW	COL	Wilmer Duarte
—	FW	VEN	William García
—	MF	VEN	Rodrigo Morales
