= Llaneros Escuela de Fútbol =

Venezuelan football club

Llaneros
- Full name: Llaneros de Guanare Fútbol Club
- Nickname(s): El Batallón Santo
- Founded: 5 August 1985; 39 years ago
- Dissolved: 2022
- Ground: Estadio Rafael Calles Pinto; Guanare, Venezuela
- Capacity: 13,000
- Chairman: Ángel Luís Geretti
- Manager: Edwin Quilagury
- 2022: Segunda División, 20th of 20
Home colours	Away colours

Llaneros de Guanare Escuela de Fútbol (usually called Llaneros) was a Venezuelan professional football club based in Guanare, Portuguesa State.

== Achievements ==
- Segunda División Venezolana: 3

1996, 1999, 2011

== Current first team squad ==
Note: Flags indicate national team as defined under FIFA eligibility rules; some limited exceptions apply. Players may hold more than one non-FIFA nationality.

No.	Pos.	Nation	Player
—	GK	(Venezuela) VEN	Julio Álvarez
—	GK	(Venezuela) VEN	Carlos Salazar
—	GK	(Venezuela) VEN	Edgar Pérez
—	DF	(Venezuela) VEN	Wilfredo Alvarado
—	DF	(Venezuela) VEN	Norberto Riascos
—	DF	(Venezuela) VEN	Anderson Orozco
—	DF	(Venezuela) VEN	Carlos Torres
—	DF	(Venezuela) VEN	Brixio Pulgar
—	DF	(Venezuela) VEN	Daniel Julio
—	DF	(Venezuela) VEN	Charly Velazco
—	DF	(Venezuela) VEN	Jesús Ordóñez
—	MF	(Venezuela) VEN	Marcel Rivero
—	MF	(Venezuela) VEN	Alejandro Rivero
—	MF	(Venezuela) VEN	Ronald Erickson Mora

No.	Pos.	Nation	Player
—	MF	(Venezuela) VEN	Antonioni González
—	MF	(Venezuela) VEN	Guillermo Ramírez
—	MF	(Venezuela) VEN	Alfonso Cegarra
—	MF	(Venezuela) VEN	Hale El Halah El Halah
—	FW	(Venezuela) VEN	Jesús González
—	FW	(Venezuela) VEN	Ever Eleazar Espinoza
—	FW	(Venezuela) VEN	Gilson Ortiz
—	FW	(Colombia) COL	Leandro Vargas
—	FW	(Venezuela) VEN	Julio José Antequera Oropeza
—	FW	(Venezuela) VEN	Julio Omar Barbosa
—	FW	(Venezuela) VEN	Roberto Jiménez
—	FW	(Venezuela) VEN	Douglas Bracho

== Managers ==
- (Venezuela) Frank Piedrahita (July 1, 2009–July 1, 2011), (July 1, 2012–2012)
- (Venezuela) Miguel Acosta (Sept 20, 2011–Dec 31, 2012)
- (Venezuela) Rodrigo Piñon (2013)
