= Caracas F.C. =

Association football club in Venezuela

Caracas
- Full name: Caracas Fútbol Club
- Nickname: Los Rojos del Ávila (The Reds from Ávila)
- Founded: 5 June 1967; 59 years ago
- Ground: Estadio Olímpico de la UCV
- Capacity: 23,940
- Chairman: Phillip Valentiner
- Manager: Noel Sanvicente
- League: Liga FUTVE
- 2025: Liga FUTVE, 7th of 14
- Website: www.caracasfutbolclub.com
Home colours	Away colours	Third colours

Caracas Fútbol Club is a Venezuelan professional football team based in Caracas. The club has won twelve First Division titles making it the most successful in Venezuelan football history.

They are nicknamed Los Rojos del Ávila, or the "Reds from Ávila". This refers to their red jerseys as well as Cerro El Ávila, a mountain near Caracas.

== History ==
=== Early years ===
Caracas FC was founded in 1967 under a group of friends led by José Beracasa and Jorge Cubeddu with the name Yamaha FC. The team was entered as an amateur team to the Football Federation of the State of Miranda. The purpose of the club was to allow for Beracasa and his friends to have somewhere to enjoy their free time. As a result, Beracasa created one of the most historical and winning sports franchises in Venezuelan history.

In 1984, renamed Caracas-Yamaha FC after successful seasons in the amateur league, the team was admitted into the Second Division. Their first season in the professional league they won the division and gained promotion to the First Division.

=== Turmoil in the First Division ===
Their first season in the First Division was unstable as they barely survived relegation. After an acceptable second season in 1986, where relegation was not a huge threat, they were renamed Caracas FC when RCTV bought part of them and had joint leadership with Yamaha. Under the guidance of Manuel Plasencia and Luis Mendoza as the managers of the club, the subsequent 1987 season was their best to date.

Reaching the last set of games in the eight-team tournament, they needed a place in the top two in order to qualify for the Copa Libertadores and compete on an international level. However, they lost on the last weekend to now arch-rivals Deportivo Táchira and barely missed out on international competition. The next year brought changes for the First Division as it would now follow the European format of games being played from the Fall to Spring.

The 1988–89 season started well for Caracas FC and they even lifted the Copa de Venezuela but suspensions and injuries in the second half of the season almost led to the collapse of the team. However, even after many of the team's players left, the team was saved by the Cocodrilos Sports Organization, which was led by Guillermo Valentiner until his death, and his son, Philip Valentiner is the owner today.

=== Success in the First Division ===
Despite a primarily amateur squad, the team finished fourth in the league during the 1989–90 season. Two years later in the 1991–92 season, under manager Manuel Plasencia, who had stayed through the turmoil, Caracas FC won their first national championship. They went on to win the next two seasons, with the third title in 1993–94 being won under a new manager, Pedro Febles. However, after an unsuccessful 1994–95 season, Plasencia returned to lead the team to a title in the 1995–96 season. It is also worth noting that during this time Caracas FC won the Copa de Venezuela twice, though historically that competition has been marked by instability and anonymity.

After four years of titleless competition, they won their fifth national championship under Carlos Moreno. However, the 1999 season saw Caracas FC reach the semi-finals of the Copa Merconorte, their greatest success to date in international competition. The next year marked the appointment of the then 37-year-old Noel Sanvicente took over the club. He is Caracas' most successful manager as he was able to win five titles in 2002–03, 2003–04, 2005–06, 2006–07, and most recently in 2008–09. He also led Caracas FC to its best ever position in South America's most prestigious club competition, the Copa Libertadores.

In 2010, Noel Sanvicente stepped down from the team following which Ceferino Bencomo took over as manager. Under Ceferino Bencomo, Caracas FC won its eleventh national championship title defeating arch-rival Deportivo Táchira in a two game final.

Caracas F.C. has developed many important players through their academy that are now playing for important clubs around the World, such as Ronald Vargas (AEK Athens F.C) and Luis Manuel Seijas (Internacional de Porto Alegre).

=== Colors and Uniform ===
The club's colors are red, white and black.

- Home Uniform: A red top with black stripes down the side and on the borders. Paired with black shorts and socks.
- Away Uniform: A white top with red stripes down the side and on the borders. Paired with white shorts bordered in red and white socks.
- Third Uniform: A black top with red stripes down the side and on the borders. Paired with black shorts with red borders and black

== Stadium ==
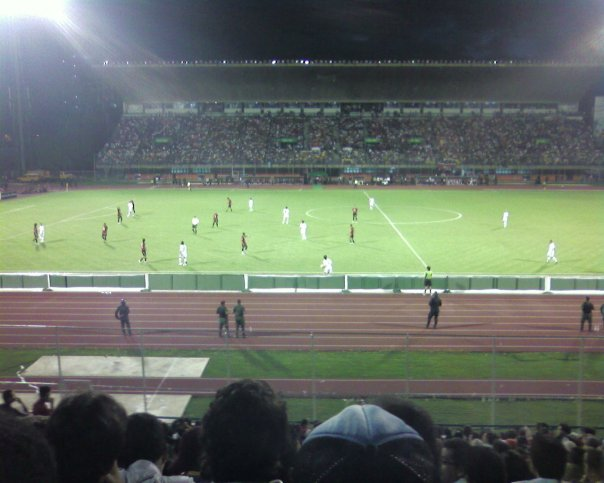
Caracas FC game, 2008–09 season; in the Estadio Olimpico de la UCV

Caracas Fútbol Club has played their home matches at Cocodrilos Sports Park since the season 2006–07. Cocodrilos Sports Park has a maximum capacity of 3,500 people, with future expansions planned to 6,000 people, and then to 15,000. The field has an artificial grass surface.

For bigger national league or international tournaments games, the club has used the Brígido Iriarte Stadium. This stadium is also used by another professional Caracas club, Deportivo Italia. It has an official capacity of 12,000 people; however, there have been crowds of 20,000 spectators in games against Deportivo Táchira (their historical rival), São Paulo and other teams.

Recently Caracas Fútbol Club has played at the Estadio Olímpico de la UCV which has a maximum capacity of 30,000 spectators. This has been used primarily for the Copa Libertadores along with important First Division matches. Since the 2007–08 season the Estadio Olímpico de la UCV will be used as the temporary home ground because of the expansion and redesign of Cocodrilos Sports Park which is being used as a training facility in the meantime. The stadium meet all the requirements to perform international games like Copa Libertadores and Copa Sudamericana.

== Honours ==
=== National ===
- Primera División
  - Winners (12): 1991–92, 1993–94, 1994–95, 1996–97, 2000–01, 2002–03, 2003–04, 2005–06, 2006–07, 2008–09, 2009–10, 2019
- Copa Venezuela
  - Winners (5): 1987, 1993, 1994, 2009, 2013
- Segunda División
  - Winners (1): 1984 (as Caracas – Yamaha)

== Performance in CONMEBOL competitions ==
- Copa Libertadores: 22 appearances

1993: First Round
1995: Round of 16 (second round)
1996: First Round
1998: Preliminary Round
2001: Preliminary Round
2002: Preliminary Round
2004: First Round
2005: First Round
2006: First Round
2007: Round of 16 (second round)

2008: First Round
2009: Quarter-finals
2010: First Round
2011: First Round
2012: Preliminary Round
2013: First Round
2014: Preliminary Round
2016: Preliminary Round
2019: Third Qualifying Stage
2020: First Round
2021: Second Qualifying Stage

2022: First Round

- Copa Sudamericana: 7 appearances

2010: Second Round
2014: Second Round
2017: First Round
2018: Round of 16
2019: Round of 16
2020: Second Round
2023: Qualifying Stage

- Recopa Sudamericana: 0 appearances

:

- Copa Merconorte: 2 appearances

1998: Group Stage
1999: Semi-finals

- Copa CONMEBOL: 1 appearance

1993: Quarter-finals

== Current roster ==
As of 14 March, 2026

Note: Flags indicate national team as defined under FIFA eligibility rules; some limited exceptions apply. Players may hold more than one non-FIFA nationality.

No.	Pos.	Nation	Player
1	GK	VEN	Frankarlos Benítez
2	DF	VEN	Eduardo Fereira
4	DF	VEN	Jesús Quintero
5	MF	VEN	Miguel Vegas
7	FW	VEN	Robert Hernández
8	MF	PAN	Irving Gudiño (on loan from Tauro)
9	FW	PAR	Adrián Fernández
10	MF	VEN	Michael Covea
11	FW	VEN	Mauricio Márquez
12	GK	VEN	Juan Vegas
13	DF	VEN	Jesús Yendis
14	DF	VEN	Francisco La Mantia (captain)
15	MF	VEN	Christian Larotonda

No.	Pos.	Nation	Player
17	FW	VEN	Lucciano Reinoso
19	DF	VEN	Luis Mago
20	MF	VEN	Luis Maestre
22	MF	VEN	Ángel Figueroa
27	FW	COL	Sebastian Gonzalez
29	FW	VEN	José Rondón
30	DF	VEN	Aytor Herrera
31	FW	VEN	José Hernández
32	MF	VEN	Marco Morigi
33	MF	VEN	Wilfred Correa
34	FW	VEN	Chris Martínez
37	MF	VEN	Charly Vegas

== Managers ==
- (Venezuela) Manuel Plasencia (Jan 1, 1993 – March, 1997)
- (Venezuela) Noel Sanvicente (Jan 1, 1998 – March 18, 2010)
- (Venezuela) Ceferino Bencomo (March 28, 2010 – May 15, 2013)
- (Venezuela) Eduardo Saragó (May 17, 2013 – 2017)
- (Venezuela) Noel Sanvicente (Jan 1, 2018 – 2021)
- (Venezuela) Francesco Stífano (Dec 27, 2021 – 2022)
- (Venezuela) Leonardo González (Nov 2022 – March 2024)
