= Unión Atlético Maracaibo =

Venezuelan football club

- Full name: Unión Atlético Maracaibo
- Nicknames: El Unión; Bicolor; Bico
- Founded: 16 January 2001; 24 years ago 2021; 5 years ago (refoundation)
- Ground: José Pachencho Romero; Maracaibo, Venezuela
- Capacity: 45,000
- League: Liga FUTVE 2
Home colours	Away colours

Club Unión Atlético Maracaibo (usually called Maracaibo) Is a professional football club based in Maracaibo, Zulia State. It played in the Venezuelan First Division and played its home matches at the José Encarnación Pachencho Romero Stadium.

It won the Venezuelan First Division title in 2004-05. Its colors from the beginning were blue and red, the colors of the Maracaibo city flag. In 2026, the club was refounded as "Unión Atlético Maracaibo" and will return to play in the Venezuelan Second Division.

== Titles ==
=== Domestic ===
- Primera División Venezolana
  - Winners (1): 2004–05
  - Runner-up (3): 2002–03, 2005–06, 2006–07

== Performance in CONMEBOL competitions ==
- Copa Libertadores: 4 appearances

2004: 2nd Group Stage, lost playoff round
2006: Group Stage
2007: Group Stage
2008: Group Stage

- Copa Sudamericana: 1 appearance

2008: First Round
