= 2018 Liga FUTVE =

Liga FUTVE
- Season: 2018
- Champions: Zamora (4th title)
- Copa Libertadores: Zamora; Deportivo Lara; Caracas; Deportivo La Guaira
- Copa Sudamericana: Zulia (cup winners); Mineros; Monagas; Estudiantes de Mérida
- Matches: 336
- Goals: 773 (2.3 per match)
- Top goalscorer: Apertura: Tommy Tobar (12 goals); Clausura: Darwin González (13 goals); Season: Anthony Uribe (16 goals)
- Biggest home win: Monagas 5–0 Atlético Venezuela; 28 July 2018; Zulia 5–0 Metropolitanos; 23 September 2018
- Biggest away win: Atlético Venezuela 0–4 Aragua; 24 February 2018; Anzoátegui 0–4 Metropolitanos; 4 August 2018
- Highest scoring: Deportivo Lara 3–3 Zulia; 11 February 2018; Mineros 3–3 Carabobo; 23 April 2018; Zulia 2–4 Aragua; 13 May 2018; Est. Mérida 4–2 Est. Caracas; 18 May 2018

The 2018 Primera División season, officially Liga de Fútbol Profesional Venezolano or Liga FUTVE, was the 37th professional season of Venezuela's top-flight football league. Monagas were the defending champions, but did not qualify to the Serie Final, after being eliminated in the regular season of the Torneo Apertura and by Caracas in the quarter-finals of the Torneo Clausura.

Zamora were the champions, defeating Deportivo Lara on the Serie Final, 5–1 on aggregate.

== Teams ==
=== Stadia and locations ===
Locations of the 2018 Primera División teams

Relegated to 2018 Segunda División: 17 / Deportivo JBL; 18 / Atlético Socopó	Promoted to 2018 Primera División: 1 / Estudiantes de Caracas; 3 / Academia Puerto Cabello

Gran Valencia reached the final of the Segunda División and earned promotion to the Primera División, but the team was suspended "temporarily" by the Honorary Council of the FVF after forfeiting the second leg of the final. On 15 January, Academia Puerto Cabello was announced as the replacement.

Team	Manager	City	Stadium	Capacity
Academia Puerto Cabello	(Venezuela) Pedro Depablos	Puerto Cabello	La Bombonerita	7,500
Aragua	(Venezuela) Enrique García	Maracay	Olímpico Hermanos Ghersi Páez	14,000
Atlético Venezuela	Vacant	Caracas	Brígido Iriarte^{c}	10,000
Carabobo	(Venezuela) Jhonny Ferreira	Valencia	Misael Delgado^{d}	10,400
Caracas	(Venezuela) Noel Sanvicente	Caracas	Olímpico de la UCV^{a}	23,940
Deportivo Anzoátegui	(Venezuela) Jobanny Rivero	Puerto La Cruz	José Antonio Anzoátegui	37,485
Deportivo La Guaira	(Venezuela) Daniel Farías	Caracas	Olímpico de la UCV^{a}	23,940
Deportivo Lara	(Venezuela) Leonardo González	Cabudare	Metropolitano de Cabudare	47,913
Deportivo Táchira	(Venezuela) Giovanny Pérez	San Cristóbal	Polideportivo de Pueblo Nuevo	38,755
Estudiantes de Caracas	(Venezuela) José María Morr	Caracas	Brígido Iriarte^{c}	10,000
Estudiantes de Mérida	(Argentina) Martín Brignani	Mérida	Metropolitano de Mérida^{b}	42,200
Metropolitanos	(Venezuela) Jhon Giraldo	Caracas	Olímpico de la UCV^{c}	23,940
Mineros	(Argentina) Horacio Matuszyczk	Ciudad Guayana	Polideportivo Cachamay	41,600
Monagas	(Venezuela) José Manuel Rey	Maturín	Monumental de Maturín	51,796
Portuguesa	(Venezuela) Raymond Páez	Acarigua	General José Antonio Páez	18,000
Trujillanos	(Venezuela) José Nabor Gavidia	Valera	José Alberto Pérez	25,000
Zamora	(Venezuela) Alí Cañas	Barinas	Agustín Tovar	29,800
Zulia	(Venezuela) Francesco Stifano	Maracaibo	José "Pachencho" Romero	40,800

a: Caracas and Deportivo La Guaira played outside of the Estadio Olímpico in Caracas until September due to maintenance works at the stadium. Caracas played its matches at Cocodrilos Sports Park and La Guaira at the Estadio José Antonio Anzoátegui in Puerto La Cruz (Torneo Apertura) and the Universidad Santa María campus in Caracas (Torneo Clausura).
b: In the Torneo Apertura, Estudiantes de Mérida played Matchday 3 (against Aragua) at the Estadio General José Antonio Páez in Acarigua and Matchday 5 (against Mineros) at the Estadio Rafael Calles Pinto in Guanare, as the Estadio Metropolitano in Mérida was suspended.
c: Atlético Venezuela, Estudiantes de Caracas and Metropolitanos played at Brígido Iriarte Stadium in Caracas until 11 March as the stadium was suspended. Atlético Venezuela is playing at the Estadio Giuseppe Antonelli in Maracay and Estudiantes de Caracas and Metropolitanos are playing at the Universidad Santa María campus in Caracas. Metropolitanos will play at the Estadio Olímpico in Caracas once the works are finished.
d: In the Torneo Clausura, Carabobo will play outside of the Estadio Misael Delgado in Valencia due to maintenance works at the stadium. Carabobo will play at the Estadio Metropolitano in Cabudare.

==== Managerial changes ====
Team	Outgoing manager	Manner of departure	Date of vacancy	Position in table	Incoming manager	Date of appointment
Torneo Apertura
Deportivo Anzoátegui	(Venezuela) Charles López			Pre-season	(Venezuela) Francisco Velásquez	24 January
Deportivo Anzoátegui	(Venezuela) Francisco Velásquez	Sacked	3 March	18th	(Venezuela) Lisandro Altieri	6 March
Atlético Venezuela	(Spain) Alex Pallarés	Mutual consent	20 March	12th	(Venezuela) Tony Franco	25 March
Deportivo La Guaira	(Venezuela) Pedro Depablos	Sacked	19 April	5th	(Venezuela) Daniel Farías	23 April
Metropolitanos	(Venezuela) Daniel de Oliveira	Mutual consent	30 April	17th	(Venezuela) Manuel Di Maio (caretaker)	2 May
Deportivo Táchira	(Venezuela) Francesco Stifano	Mutual consent	22 May	10th	(Spain) Alex Pallarés	23 May
Academia Puerto Cabello	(Venezuela) Jeremy Nowak	Mutual consent	29 May	14th	(Venezuela) Pedro Depablos	1 June
Monagas	(Venezuela) Jhonny Ferreira	Resigned	5 June	15th	(Venezuela) José Manuel Rey	25 June
Deportivo Anzoátegui	(Venezuela) Lisandro Altieri	Replaced	7 June	18th	(Venezuela) José González	7 June
Metropolitanos	(Venezuela) Manuel Di Maio	End of caretaker spell	12 June	17th	(Venezuela) Jhon Giraldo	12 June
Zulia	(Venezuela) Carlos Maldonado	Mutual consent	13 June	13th	(Venezuela) Francesco Stifano	17 June
Torneo Clausura
Estudiantes de Mérida	(Venezuela) José Nabor Gavidia	Sacked	18 June	Pre-tournament	(Argentina) Martín Brignani	19 June
Aragua	(Venezuela) José Manuel Rey	Signed by Monagas	25 June	Pre-tournament	(Colombia) Héctor Estrada	29 June
Portuguesa	(Argentina) Carlos Horacio Moreno	Resigned	2 August	17th	(Venezuela) Raúl Vargas (caretaker)	2 August
Deportivo Anzoátegui	(Venezuela) José González	Mutual consent	27 August	16th	(Venezuela) Richard Arrieta (caretaker)	27 August
Estudiantes de Caracas	(Venezuela) José Fasciana	Mutual consent	29 August	14th	(Venezuela) José María Morr	30 August
Deportivo Anzoátegui	(Venezuela) Richard Arrieta	End of caretaker spell	4 September	16th	(Venezuela) Jobanny Rivero	4 September
Carabobo	(Colombia) Wilson Gutiérrez	Resigned	6 September	15th	(Venezuela) Gustavo Caraballo	7 September
Portuguesa	(Venezuela) Raúl Vargas	Replaced	7 September	18th	(Venezuela) Raymond Páez	7 September
Atlético Venezuela	(Venezuela) Tony Franco	Sacked	2 November	13th		
Aragua	(Colombia) Héctor Estrada	Sacked	14 November	17th	(Venezuela) Enrique García	28 November
Carabobo	(Venezuela) Gustavo Caraballo	Sacked	16 November	16th	(Venezuela) Jhonny Ferreira	29 November
Deportivo Táchira	(Spain) Alex Pallarés	Resigned	20 November	3rd, SF	(Venezuela) Giovanny Pérez	3 December
Trujillanos	(Argentina) Horacio Matuszyczk	Resigned	20 November	5th, QF	(Venezuela) José Nabor Gavidia	27 November
Mineros	(Venezuela) Juan Tolisano	Resigned	22 November	11th	(Argentina) Horacio Matuszyczk	22 November

== Torneo Apertura ==
The Torneo Apertura is the first tournament of the season. The regular season started on 28 January and ended on 19 May.

=== Standings ===
Pos	Team	Pld	W	D	L	GF	GA	GD	Pts	Qualification
1	Carabobo	17	10	6	1	31	16	+15	36	Advance to knockout stage
2	Zamora	17	9	4	4	21	15	+6	31	Advance to knockout stage
3	Caracas	17	9	3	5	22	13	+9	30	Advance to knockout stage
4	Mineros	17	8	6	3	21	14	+7	30	Advance to knockout stage
5	Deportivo La Guaira	17	8	4	5	20	16	+4	28	Advance to knockout stage
6	Deportivo Lara	17	7	6	4	21	15	+6	27	Advance to knockout stage
7	Estudiantes de Mérida	17	7	6	4	24	20	+4	27	Advance to knockout stage
8	Aragua	17	6	6	5	22	16	+6	24	Advance to knockout stage
9	Portuguesa	17	6	5	6	14	22	−8	23	
10	Deportivo Táchira	17	5	7	5	20	19	+1	22	
11	Atlético Venezuela	17	6	4	7	21	21	0	22	
12	Trujillanos	17	5	6	6	15	19	−4	21	
13	Zulia	17	3	8	6	24	26	−2	17	
14	Academia Puerto Cabello	17	4	5	8	8	14	−6	17	
15	Monagas	17	3	7	7	18	19	−1	16	
16	Estudiantes de Caracas	17	3	4	10	12	29	−17	13	
17	Deportivo Anzoátegui	17	1	9	7	15	25	−10	12	
18	Metropolitanos	17	2	6	9	13	23	−10	12	

Source: Liga FUTVE, Soccerway
Rules for classification: 1) Points; 2) Goal difference; 3) Goals scored.

=== Results ===
Home \ Away	APC	ARA	AVE	CBO	CAR	ANZ	DLG	LAR	TAC	ESC	ESM	MET	MIN	MON	POR	TRU	ZAM	ZUL
Academia Puerto Cabello	—	0–1	—	—	—	0–0	1–2	—	—	1–0	2–1	—	—	1–0	0–1	—	—	0–0
Aragua	—	—	—	0–1	1–2	—	—	1–0	1–1	—	—	2–0	0–1	—	—	0–0	3–2	—
Atlético Venezuela	1–0	0–4	—	—	—	2–1	0–1	—	—	3–1	4–0	—	—	1–0	1–2	—	—	1–1
Carabobo	3–2	—	1–0	—	0–0	2–2	2–1	—	—	—	2–1	—	—	2–2	4–0	—	—	3–2
Caracas	2–0	—	0–2	—	—	4–0	2–1	—	—	—	0–0	—	—	1–2	1–0	—	—	3–1
Deportivo Anzoátegui	—	2–1	—	—	—	—	1–2	—	—	1–1	1–1	—	0–1	1–1	0–0	—	0–1	—
Deportivo La Guaira	—	0–0	—	—	—	—	—	—	1–2	2–0	1–2	1–0	2–2	0–0	1–1	—	1–2	—
Deportivo Lara	1–0	—	3–2	0–0	0–1	1–0	0–1	—	—	—	—	—	—	—	3–1	2–0	—	3–3
Deportivo Táchira	2–0	—	1–1	3–2	0–3	2–2	—	0–0	—	—	—	3–1	—	—	—	2–0	—	1–1
Estudiantes de Caracas	—	1–1	—	0–1	1–0	—	—	2–2	1–0	—	—	1–0	1–2	—	—	0–1	0–2	—
Estudiantes de Mérida	—	1–1	—	—	—	—	—	2–1	2–1	4–2	—	3–1	1–1	—	—	1–1	3–0	—
Metropolitanos	0–0	—	1–0	0–0	1–2	2–2	—	0–2	—	—	—	—	—	—	—	0–0	—	1–1
Mineros	0–1	—	2–0	3–3	2–0	—	—	1–1	1–0	—	—	2–1	—	—	—	1–0	—	1–1
Monagas	—	2–2	—	—	—	—	—	1–2	2–2	4–0	0–0	1–0	1–1	—	—	—	1–2	—
Portuguesa	—	1–0	—	—	—	—	—	—	0–0	1–1	1–0	1–3	1–0	1–0	—	—	0–3	—
Trujillanos	0–0	—	2–2	0–3	1–1	3–1	1–2	—	—	—	—	—	—	1–0	3–1	—	—	2–0
Zamora	0–0	—	1–1	0–2	1–0	—	—	0–0	1–0	—	—	2–2	1–0	—	—	3–0	—	—
Zulia	—	2–4	—	—	—	1–1	0–1	—	—	4–0	1–2	—	—	2–1	2–2	—	2–0	—

Source: Liga FUTVE, Soccerway
Legend: Blue = home team win; Yellow = draw; Red = away team win.

=== Knockout stage ===
Quarter-finals
2	Zamora	3	3	6
7	Estudiantes de Mérida	1	1	2
3	Caracas	3	2	5
6	Deportivo Lara	1	0	1
1	Carabobo	0	2	2
8	Aragua	0	0	0
4	Mineros	0	2	2
5	Deportivo La Guaira	0	0	0

Semi-finals
2	Zamora	1	3	4
3	Caracas	0	2	2
1	Carabobo	1	2	3
4	Mineros	1	3	4

Final
2	Zamora	1	1	2
4	Mineros	1	0	1

==== Quarter-finals ====
Team 1	Agg.	Team 2	1st leg	2nd leg
Aragua	0–2	Carabobo	0–0	0–2
Estudiantes de Mérida	2–6	Zamora	1–3	1–3
Deportivo Lara	1–5	Caracas	1–3	0–2
Deportivo La Guaira	0–2	Mineros	0–0	0–2

===== First leg =====
26 May 2018	Aragua	0–0	Carabobo	Maracay
17:00		Report		Stadium: Hermanos Ghersi Páez; Referee: Juan Soto

26 May 2018	Deportivo La Guaira	0–0	Mineros	Puerto La Cruz
19:30		Report		Stadium: Estadio José Antonio Anzoátegui; Referee: Ángel Arteaga

27 May 2018	Estudiantes de Mérida	1–3	Zamora	Mérida
17:00	Jaramillo 77'	Report	Romero 41'; Uribe 55'; González 66'	Stadium: Estadio Metropolitano; Referee: Jesús Valenzuela

27 May 2018	Deportivo Lara	1–3	Caracas	Cabudare
19:30	Falcón 26'	Report	Hernández 32'; Aristeguieta 35', 71'	Stadium: Estadio Metropolitano; Referee: José Luis Hoyo

===== Second leg =====
30 May 2018	Carabobo	2–0 (2–0 agg.)	Aragua	Valencia
17:00	Cova 39'; Montaña 88'	Report		Stadium: Misael Delgado; Referee: José Argote

30 May 2018	Mineros	2–0 (2–0 agg.)	Deportivo La Guaira	Ciudad Guayana
19:30	Blanco 46', 90+1'	Report		Stadium: Polideportivo Cachamay; Referee: Orlando Bracamonte

31 May 2018	Zamora	3–1 (6–2 agg.)	Estudiantes de Mérida	Barinas
17:00	Gallardo 35', 37'; Romero 49'	Report	Rivas 39'	Stadium: Agustín Tovar; Referee: Freddy Briceño

31 May 2018	Caracas	2–0 (5–1 agg.)	Deportivo Lara	Maracay
19:30	Aristeguieta 30', 76'	Report		Stadium: Hermanos Ghersi Páez; Referee: Alexis Herrera

==== Semi-finals ====
Team 1	Agg.	Team 2	1st leg	2nd leg
Mineros	4–3	Carabobo	1–1	3–2
Caracas	2–4	Zamora	0–1	2–3

===== First leg =====
2 June 2018	Mineros	1–1	Carabobo	Ciudad Guayana
19:00	Peña 40'	Report	Fernández 55'	Stadium: Polideportivo Cachamay; Referee: Francisco López

3 June 2018	Caracas	0–1	Zamora	Maracay
19:00		Report	Rojas 60'	Stadium: Hermanos Ghersi Páez; Referee: Ángel Arteaga

===== Second leg =====
6 June 2018	Carabobo	2–3 (3–4 agg.)	Mineros	Valencia
19:00	Cova 40'; Rivero 45'	Report	Peña 31'; Machado 80'; Blanco 90+5'	Stadium: Misael Delgado; Referee: Jesús Valenzuela

7 June 2018	Zamora	3–2 (4–2 agg.)	Caracas	Barinas
19:00	Osorio 3'; Pérez 24'; Romero 78'	Report	Pernía 10'; Arrieta 90+2'	Stadium: Agustín Tovar; Referee: Marlon Escalante

==== Final ====
10 June 2018
19:00

Mineros	1–1	Zamora
Gómez 71'	Report	Romero 68'

Polideportivo Cachamay, Ciudad Guayana
Referee: Alexis Herrera

13 June 2018
19:00

Zamora	1–0	Mineros
Gallardo 73'	Report

Estadio Agustín Tovar, Barinas
Referee: José Argote

Zamora won 2–1 on aggregate.

=== Top goalscorers ===
Rank	Player	Club	Goals
1	(Colombia) Tommy Tobar	Carabobo	12
2	(Venezuela) Edwuin Pernía	Caracas	11
3	(Venezuela) Fernando Aristeguieta	Caracas	8
3	(Venezuela) Manuel Arteaga	Deportivo La Guaira	8
5	(Venezuela) Jhonder Cádiz	Monagas	7
5	(Venezuela) Richard Blanco	Mineros	7
5	(Argentina) Cristian Alessandrini	Atlético Venezuela	7
5	(Venezuela) Anthony Uribe	Zamora	7
5	(Venezuela) Maurice Cova	Carabobo	7
5	(Venezuela) Danny Pérez	Zamora	7

== Torneo Clausura ==
The Torneo Clausura is the second tournament of the season. The regular season started on 21 July and ended on 28 October.

=== Standings ===
Pos	Team	Pld	W	D	L	GF	GA	GD	Pts	Qualification
1	Monagas	17	10	4	3	26	12	+14	34	Advance to knockout stage
2	Deportivo La Guaira	17	8	6	3	28	25	+3	30	Advance to knockout stage
3	Deportivo Táchira	17	8	5	4	24	15	+9	29	Advance to knockout stage
4	Deportivo Lara	17	7	8	2	20	11	+9	29	Advance to knockout stage
5	Trujillanos	17	8	5	4	23	19	+4	29	Advance to knockout stage
6	Estudiantes de Mérida	17	7	7	3	28	20	+8	28	Advance to knockout stage
7	Zamora	17	8	4	5	25	19	+6	28	Advance to knockout stage
8	Caracas	17	8	4	5	22	19	+3	28	Advance to knockout stage
9	Mineros	17	6	9	2	24	15	+9	27	
10	Zulia	17	6	5	6	25	19	+6	23	
11	Estudiantes de Caracas	17	5	4	8	18	25	−7	19	
12	Academia Puerto Cabello	17	3	9	5	21	23	−2	18	
13	Atlético Venezuela	17	4	6	7	18	25	−7	18	
14	Metropolitanos	17	4	3	10	14	25	−11	15	
15	Deportivo Anzoátegui (Note: Deportivo Anzoátegui were deducted 6 points.)	17	5	5	7	16	23	−7	14	
16	Carabobo	17	3	5	9	11	19	−8	14	
17	Aragua	17	3	4	10	8	19	−11	13	
18	Portuguesa	17	2	3	12	13	30	−17	9	

Source: Liga FUTVE, Soccerway
Rules for classification: 1) Points; 2) Goal difference; 3) Goals scored.

=== Results ===
Home \ Away	APC	ARA	AVE	CBO	CAR	ANZ	DLG	LAR	TAC	ESC	ESM	MET	MIN	MON	POR	TRU	ZAM	ZUL
Academia Puerto Cabello	—	—	0–2	2–2	2–0	—	—	2–2	0–0	—	—	1–1	2–2	—	—	1–1	2–1	—
Aragua	0–0	—	2–0	—	—	0–0	1–2	—	—	0–0	1–3	—	—	0–1	1–0	—	—	0–2
Atlético Venezuela	—	—	—	1–1	0–1	—	—	0–0	0–0	—	—	2–1	2–2	—	—	3–0	0–2	—
Carabobo	—	0–0	—	—	—	—	—	0–2	0–1	1–0	—	1–0	0–0	—	—	0–1	0–2	—
Caracas	—	2–0	—	0–3	—	—	—	0–1	1–1	1–2	—	3–0	0–0	—	—	2–0	2–2	—
Deportivo Anzoátegui	2–1	—	1–1	1–0	1–2	—	—	2–1	0–1	—	—	0–4	—	—	—	3–1	—	0–2
Deportivo La Guaira	3–2	—	2–1	2–1	1–2	0–0	—	1–1	—	—	—	—	—	—	—	2–2	—	1–1
Deportivo Lara	—	2–0	—	—	—	—	—	—	1–1	1–0	2–2	2–1	0–0	1–1	—	—	2–0	—
Deportivo Táchira	—	3–1	—	—	—	—	3–1	—	—	3–1	2–3	—	1–4	0–1	3–0	—	1–1	—
Estudiantes de Caracas	1–1	—	1–1	—	—	3–2	2–3	—	—	—	3–2	—	—	0–1	1–0	—	—	1–1
Estudiantes de Mérida	2–0	—	3–1	1–1	1–1	2–0	1–2	—	—	—	—	—	—	1–1	2–1	—	—	1–1
Metropolitanos	—	0–2	—	—	—	—	1–1	—	0–3	0–1	0–1	—	1–1	2–0	1–0	—	1–0	—
Mineros	—	1–0	—	—	—	2–0	1–1	—	—	3–0	2–1	—	—	1–2	2–2	—	2–2	—
Monagas	2–1	—	5–0	3–0	2–0	1–1	2–3	—	—	—	—	—	—	—	2–0	1–1	—	1–0
Portuguesa	1–3	—	1–3	1–0	1–2	1–1	1–2	0–0	—	—	—	—	—	—	—	1–2	—	2–1
Trujillanos	—	2–0	—	—	—	—	—	1–0	0–1	4–1	1–1	2–1	1–0	—	—	—	2–0	—
Zamora	—	1–0	—	—	—	1–2	3–1	—	—	2–1	1–1	—	—	1–0	4–1	—	—	2–1
Zulia	1–1	—	3–1	2–1	2–3	—	—	0–2	1–0	—	—	5–0	0–1	—	—	2–2	—	—

Source: Liga FUTVE, Soccerway
Legend: Blue = home team win; Yellow = draw; Red = away team win.

=== Knockout stage ===
Quarter-finals
2	Deportivo La Guaira	0	3	3
7	Zamora	1	1	2
3	Deportivo Táchira	0	3	3
6	Estudiantes de Mérida	0	1	1
4	Deportivo Lara (a)	1	1	2
5	Trujillanos	2	0	2
1	Monagas	2	1	3
8	Caracas	2	2	4

Semi-finals
2	Deportivo La Guaira	0	3	3
3	Deportivo Táchira	1	1	2
4	Deportivo Lara	1	2	3
8	Caracas	1	0	1

Final
2	Deportivo La Guaira	0	0	0
4	Deportivo Lara	0	1	1

==== Quarter-finals ====
Team 1	Agg.	Team 2	1st leg	2nd leg
Caracas	4–3	Monagas	2–2	2–1
Zamora	2–3	Deportivo La Guaira	1–0	1–3
Estudiantes de Mérida	1–3	Deportivo Táchira	0–0	1–3
Trujillanos	2–2 (a)	Deportivo Lara	2–1	0–1

===== First leg =====
3 November 2018	Estudiantes de Mérida	0–0	Deportivo Táchira	Mérida
16:00		Report		Stadium: Estadio Metropolitano; Referee: Juan Soto

3 November 2018	Zamora	1–0	Deportivo La Guaira	Barinas
19:00	Soto 18'	Report		Stadium: Agustín Tovar; Referee: José Luis Hoyo

4 November 2018	Trujillanos	2–1	Deportivo Lara	Valera
16:00	Jo. Hernández 37' (pen.), 54'	Report	A. Gómez 26'	Stadium: José Alberto Pérez; Referee: Ramón Ortega

4 November 2018	Caracas	2–2	Monagas	Caracas
19:00	Canelón 10'; Arrieta 54' (pen.)	Report	J. González 15' (pen.), 64'	Stadium: Estadio Olímpico; Referee: Jesús Valenzuela

===== Second leg =====
7 November 2018	Deportivo La Guaira	3–1 (3–2 agg.)	Zamora	Caracas
16:00	D. González 54' (pen.), 87'; H. García 90+4'	Report	Uribe 26'	Stadium: Estadio Olímpico; Referee: Francisco López

7 November 2018	Deportivo Táchira	3–1 (3–1 agg.)	Estudiantes de Mérida	San Cristóbal
19:00	Aquino 2', 37' (pen.), 62'	Report	J. Gómez 48' (pen.)	Stadium: Polideportivo de Pueblo Nuevo; Referee: Ramón Ortega

8 November 2018	Deportivo Lara (a)	1–0 (2–2 agg.)	Trujillanos	Cabudare
16:00	Je. Hernández 90+1' (pen.)	Report		Stadium: Estadio Metropolitano; Referee: Juan Carlos Cabeza

8 November 2018	Monagas	1–2 (3–4 agg.)	Caracas	Maturín
19:00	Pérez 81'	Report	Arrieta 40'; R. Hernández 51'	Stadium: Estadio Monumental; Referee: Marco Suárez

==== Semi-finals ====
Team 1	Agg.	Team 2	1st leg	2nd leg
Caracas	1–3	Deportivo Lara	1–1	0–2
Deportivo Táchira	2–3	Deportivo La Guaira	1–0	1–3

===== First leg =====
11 November 2018	Caracas	1–1	Deportivo Lara	Caracas
16:00	Quijada 63'	Report	Soto 30'	Stadium: Estadio Olímpico; Referee: Ramón Ortega

11 November 2018	Deportivo Táchira	1–0	Deportivo La Guaira	San Cristóbal
19:00	Aquino 25'	Report		Stadium: Polideportivo de Pueblo Nuevo; Referee: Emikar Caldera

===== Second leg =====
15 November 2018	Deportivo Lara	2–0 (3–1 agg.)	Caracas	Cabudare
16:00	Centeno 10'; Castellanos 52'	Report		Stadium: Estadio Metropolitano; Referee: Eduardo Mármol

15 November 2018	Deportivo La Guaira	3–1 (3–2 agg.)	Deportivo Táchira	Caracas
19:00	C. González 66'; H. García 78'; Iriberri 90+3'	Report	Pérez Greco 52'	Stadium: Estadio Olímpico; Referee: Alexis Herrera

==== Final ====
18 November 2018
19:00

Deportivo Lara	0–0	Deportivo La Guaira
	Report

Estadio Metropolitano, Cabudare
Referee: Orlando Bracamonte

25 November 2018
16:00

Deportivo La Guaira	0–1	Deportivo Lara
	Report	Je. Hernández 90'

Estadio Olímpico, Caracas
Referee: Jesús Valenzuela

Deportivo Lara won 1–0 on aggregate.

=== Top goalscorers ===
Rank	Player	Club	Goals
1	(Venezuela) Darwin González	Deportivo La Guaira	13
2	(Argentina) Gustavo Ascona	Trujillanos	10
3	(Venezuela) Anthony Uribe	Zamora	9
3	(Argentina) Enzo Maidana	Academia Puerto Cabello	9
3	(Paraguay) Víctor Aquino	Deportivo Táchira	9
6	(Venezuela) Junior Paredes	Zulia	7
6	(Venezuela) Rubén Rojas	Monagas	7
6	(Venezuela) Edder Farías	Atlético Venezuela	7
6	(Colombia) Jesús Arrieta	Caracas	7
6	(Venezuela) Robert Hernández	Caracas	7

== Serie Final ==
The Serie Final is held between the champions of the Torneo Apertura and the Torneo Clausura to determine the champions of the season. The best team of the finalists in the aggregate table chose the order of the legs.

=== First leg ===
2 December 2018
18:00

Deportivo Lara	1–1	Zamora
F. Vargas 34'	Report	Romero 31'

Estadio Metropolitano, Cabudare
Referee: Ángel Arteaga

Deportivo Lara	Zamora

GK	1	(Venezuela) Carlos Salazar
RB	29	(Venezuela) Jefre Vargas
CB	4	(Venezuela) Leonardo Aponte
CB	26	(Venezuela) Giacomo Di Giorgi (c)
LB	27	(Venezuela) Daniel Carrillo
CM	13	(Venezuela) Jesús Bueno		(substituted off) 75'
CM	5	(Venezuela) Bernaldo Manzano
CM	20	(Venezuela) Juan Castellanos		(substituted off) 69'
LW	18	(Venezuela) Freddy Vargas		(substituted off) 62'
CF	23	(Venezuela) Jesús Hernández
RW	10	(Venezuela) David Centeno	(yellow card) 74'
Substitutes:
GK	25	(Venezuela) Luis Curiel
DF	3	(Venezuela) Ignacio Anzola		(substituted on) 62'
DF	11	(Venezuela) Oswaldo Chaurant
MF	15	(Venezuela) Ricardo Andreutti
MF	24	(Venezuela) José Romero		(substituted on) 69'
FW	16	(Venezuela) Manuel Godoy
FW	28	(Venezuela) Yomber Camacaro	(yellow card) 78'	(substituted on) 75'
Manager:
(Venezuela) Leonardo González

GK	1	(Venezuela) Joel Graterol
RB	3	(Venezuela) Carlos Castro	(yellow card) 40'
CB	17	(Venezuela) Kevin de la Hoz
CB	5	(Uruguay) Ignacio González (c)	(yellow card) 90+3'
LB	12	(Venezuela) Mayker González
CM	25	(Venezuela) Maikol Quintero	(yellow card) 48'
CM	23	(Venezuela) Oscar Hernández
AM	13	(Venezuela) Pedro Ramírez		(substituted off) 72'
RW	19	(Venezuela) Antonio Romero	(yellow card) 31'	(substituted off) 90+1'
CF	21	(Venezuela) Rodolfo Marcano	(red card) 58'
LW	7	(Venezuela) Erickson Gallardo		(substituted off) 86'
Substitutes:
GK	29	(Venezuela) Daniel Valdés
MF	8	(Venezuela) José Pinto		(substituted on) 72'
MF	26	(Venezuela) Edixon Mena		(substituted on) 86'
MF	27	(Venezuela) José Soto
FW	11	(Argentina) Juan Zárate
FW	18	(Venezuela) Ángel Osorio		(substituted on) 90+1'
FW	30	(Venezuela) Darwin Matheus
Manager:
(Venezuela) Alí Cañas

Match rules

- 90 minutes.
- Seven named substitutes, of which up to three may be used.

=== Second leg ===
5 December 2018
19:00

Zamora	4–0	Deportivo Lara
Romero 5', 25', 57'; Osorio 90'	Report

Estadio Agustín Tovar, Barinas
Referee: José Argote

Zamora won 5–1 on aggregate.

Zamora	Deportivo Lara

GK	1	(Venezuela) Joel Graterol
RB	3	(Venezuela) Carlos Castro
CB	17	(Venezuela) Kevin de la Hoz
CB	5	(Uruguay) Ignacio González (c)
LB	12	(Venezuela) Mayker González
CM	25	(Venezuela) Maikol Quintero
CM	23	(Venezuela) Oscar Hernández		(substituted off) 51'
AM	13	(Venezuela) Gustavo Rojas	(yellow card) 13'
RW	19	(Venezuela) Pedro Ramírez		(substituted off) 88'
LW	7	(Venezuela) Erickson Gallardo
CF	19	(Venezuela) Antonio Romero		(substituted off) 69'
Substitutes:
GK	29	(Venezuela) Daniel Valdés
MF	8	(Venezuela) José Pinto		(substituted on) 51'
MF	26	(Venezuela) Edixon Mena		(substituted on) 88'
MF	27	(Venezuela) José Soto
FW	11	(Argentina) Juan Zárate	(yellow card) 6'
FW	18	(Venezuela) Ángel Osorio	(yellow card) 90'	(substituted on) 69'
FW	30	(Venezuela) Darwin Matheus
Manager:
(Venezuela) Alí Cañas

GK	1	(Venezuela) Carlos Salazar
RB	29	(Venezuela) Jefre Vargas
CB	4	(Venezuela) Leonardo Aponte
CB	26	(Venezuela) Giacomo Di Giorgi (c)
LB	27	(Venezuela) Daniel Carrillo
CM	13	(Venezuela) Jesús Bueno	(yellow card) 45'	(substituted off) 46'
CM	5	(Venezuela) Bernaldo Manzano
CM	10	(Venezuela) David Centeno
LW	18	(Venezuela) Freddy Vargas		(substituted off) 62'
CF	23	(Venezuela) Jesús Hernández	(yellow card) 28'
RW	7	(Venezuela) Argenis Gómez	(yellow card) 47'	(substituted off) 68'
Substitutes:
GK	25	(Venezuela) Luis Curiel
DF	3	(Venezuela) Ignacio Anzola		(substituted on) 68'
DF	11	(Venezuela) Oswaldo Chaurant
MF	15	(Venezuela) Ricardo Andreutti
MF	20	(Venezuela) Juan Castellanos		(substituted on) 46'
MF	30	(Colombia) Herlbert Soto
FW	16	(Venezuela) Manuel Godoy		(substituted on) 62'
Manager:
(Venezuela) Leonardo González

Match rules

- 90 minutes.
- If the aggregate score is level, the away goals rule is used to determine the winner.
- Penalty shoot-out if the tie persists (no extra time is played).
- Seven named substitutes, of which up to three may be used.

== Aggregate table ==
Pos	Team	Pld	W	D	L	GF	GA	GD	Pts	Qualification
1	Zamora (C)	34	17	8	9	46	34	+12	59	Qualification to Copa Libertadores group stage
2	Caracas	34	17	7	10	44	32	+12	58	Qualification to Copa Libertadores second stage
3	Deportivo La Guaira	34	16	10	8	48	41	+7	58	Qualification to Copa Libertadores first stage
4	Mineros	34	14	15	5	45	29	+16	57	Qualification to Copa Sudamericana first stage
5	Deportivo Lara	34	14	14	6	41	26	+15	56	Qualification to Copa Libertadores group stage
6	Estudiantes de Mérida	34	14	13	7	52	40	+12	55	Qualification to Copa Sudamericana first stage
7	Deportivo Táchira	34	13	12	9	44	34	+10	51	
8	Monagas	34	13	11	10	44	31	+13	50	Qualification to Copa Sudamericana first stage (Note: Monagas qualified for the Copa Sudamericana by being the 2018 Clausura classification table best team not qualified for the 2019 Copa Libertadores.)
9	Carabobo	34	13	11	10	42	35	+7	50	
10	Trujillanos	34	13	11	10	38	38	0	50	
11	Zulia	34	9	13	12	49	45	+4	40	Qualification to Copa Sudamericana first stage (Note: Zulia qualified for the Copa Sudamericana by winning the 2018 Copa Venezuela.)
12	Atlético Venezuela	34	10	10	14	39	46	−7	40	
13	Aragua	34	9	10	15	30	35	−5	37	
14	Academia Puerto Cabello	34	7	14	13	29	37	−8	35	
15	Estudiantes de Caracas	34	8	8	18	30	55	−25	32	
16	Portuguesa	34	8	8	18	27	52	−25	32	
17	Metropolitanos	34	6	9	19	27	48	−21	27	
18	Deportivo Anzoátegui (Note: Deportivo Anzoátegui were deducted 6 points.)	34	6	14	14	31	48	−17	26	

Source: FVF
Rules for classification: 1) Points; 2) Goal difference; 3) Goals scored.
(C) Champions
