= Football at the 2018 Central American and Caribbean Games – Men's team squads =

The following is a list of squads for each nation competing in football at the 2018 Central American and Caribbean Games in Barranquilla.

== Group A ==
=== Colombia ===
Head Coach: (Colombia) Arturo Reyes Montero

No.	Pos.	Player	Date of birth (age)	Club
1	GK	Manuel Arias	12 December 1997 (aged 20)	(Colombian Football Federation) Cortuluá
2	DF	Breiner Paz	27 September 1997 (aged 20)	(Colombian Football Federation) Millonarios
3	DF	Andrés Reyes	8 September 1999 (aged 18)	(Colombian Football Federation) Atlético Nacional
4	DF	Juan Palma	18 July 1999 (aged 19)	(Colombian Football Federation) Once Caldas
5	MF	Larry Vásquez	19 September 1992 (aged 25)	(Colombian Football Federation) América de Cali
6	MF	Iván Rojas	24 July 1997 (aged 20)	(Colombian Football Federation) Envigado
7	FW	Julián Quiñones	24 March 1997 (aged 21)	(Mexican Football Federation) Tigres UANL
8	MF	Yéiler Góez	1 November 1999 (aged 18)	(Colombian Football Federation) Atlético Nacional
9	FW	Leonardo Castro	14 June 1992 (aged 26)	(Colombian Football Federation) Independiente Medellín
10	MF	Yeison Tolosa	12 June 1999 (aged 19)	(Colombian Football Federation) Deportivo Cali
11	FW	Christian Mina	14 April 1997 (aged 21)	(Colombian Football Federation) Deportes Quindío
12	GK	Kevin Mier	18 May 2000 (aged 18)	(Colombian Football Federation) Atlético Nacional
13	FW	Brayan Vera	14 January 1999 (aged 19)	(Colombian Football Federation) Leones
14	MF	Hayen Palacios	8 September 1999 (aged 18)	(Colombian Football Federation) Atlético Nacional
15	DF	Léyser Chaverra	4 January 1997 (aged 21)	(Colombian Football Federation) Deportes Quindío
16	FW	Neider Barona	11 July 1997 (aged 21)	(Colombian Football Federation) La Equidad
17	MF	Michael López	8 February 1997 (aged 21)	(Colombian Football Federation) Envigado
18	FW	José Enamorado	13 January 1999 (aged 19)	(Colombian Football Federation) Orsomarso
19	FW	Luis Sandoval	1 June 1999 (aged 19)	(Colombian Football Federation) Junior
20	MF	Gustavo Carvajal	17 June 2000 (aged 18)	(Colombian Football Federation) América de Cali

=== Costa Rica ===
Head coach: (Argentina) Marcelo Herrera

No.	Pos.	Player	Date of birth (age)	Club
1	GK	Luis Diego Rivas	24 August 1997 (aged 20)	(Costa Rican Football Federation) C.S. Cartaginés
2	DF	Kevin Espinoza	2 November 1998 (aged 19)	(Costa Rican Football Federation) Guadalupe F.C.
3	DF	Pablo Arboine	3 April 1998 (aged 20)	(Costa Rican Football Federation) Santos de Guápiles F.C.
4	DF	Juan Pablo Vargas	6 June 1995 (aged 23)	(Costa Rican Football Federation) C.S. Herediano
5	MF	Juan Pablo Arguedas	21 April 1997 (aged 21)	(Costa Rican Football Federation) A.D. Carmelita
6	MF	Luis Hernández	7 February 1998 (aged 20)	(Costa Rican Football Federation) Deportivo Saprissa
7	MF	Randall Leal	14 January 1997 (aged 21)	(Royal Belgian Football Association) K.V. Mechelen
8	MF	Bernald Alfaro	26 January 1997 (aged 21)	(Costa Rican Football Federation) A.D. Carmelita
9	FW	Bryan Rojas	30 November 1997 (aged 20)	(Costa Rican Football Federation) A.D. Carmelita
10	MF	Jonathan Martinez	19 March 1998 (aged 20)	(Costa Rican Football Federation) A.D. Carmelita
11	MF	Barlon Sequeira	25 May 1998 (aged 20)	(Costa Rican Football Federation) Liga Deportiva Alajuelense
12	MF	Jimmy Marin Vilchez	8 October 1997 (aged 20)	(Costa Rican Football Federation) C.S. Herediano
13	DF	Diego Mesen	28 March 1999 (aged 19)	(Costa Rican Football Federation) Liga Deportiva Alajuelense
14	MF	Roberto Cordoba	16 July 1998 (aged 20)	(Costa Rican Football Federation) Liga Deportiva Alajuelense
15	FW	Andrés Gómez	7 May 2000 (aged 18)	(Costa Rican Football Federation) Guadalupe F.C.
16	MF	Suhander Zuñiga	15 January 1997 (aged 21)	(Costa Rican Football Federation) A.D. Carmelita
17	DF	Jose E. Espinoza Sibaja	22 November 1997 (aged 20)	(Costa Rican Football Federation) C.S. Herediano
18	GK	Patrick Sequeira	1 March 1999 (aged 19)	(Royal Spanish Football Federation) Real Unión
19	DF	Yostin Salinas	14 September 1998 (aged 19)	(Costa Rican Football Federation) Deportivo Saprissa
20	MF	Eduardo Juarez	22 September 1998 (aged 19)	(Costa Rican Football Federation) Guadalupe F.C.

=== Honduras ===
Head Coach: (Honduras) Carlos Tábora

No.	Pos.	Player	Date of birth (age)	Club
1	GK	Jordi Castro	10 April 2000 (aged 18)	(National Autonomous Federation of Football of Honduras) Real España
2	DF	Denil Maldonado	25 May 1998 (aged 20)	(National Autonomous Federation of Football of Honduras) Motagua
3	DF	Darwin Diego	14 July 1999 (aged 19)	(National Autonomous Federation of Football of Honduras) Vida
4	DF	Áxel Gómez	28 June 2000 (aged 18)	(National Autonomous Federation of Football of Honduras) Olimpia
5	MF	Jack Baptiste	20 December 1999 (aged 18)	(National Autonomous Federation of Football of Honduras) Motagua
6	DF	Éverson López	3 November 2000 (aged 17)	(National Autonomous Federation of Football of Honduras) Motagua
7	MF	Cristian Cálix	9 September 1999 (aged 18)	(National Autonomous Federation of Football of Honduras) Marathón
8	MF	Edwin Rodríguez	25 September 1999 (aged 18)	(National Autonomous Federation of Football of Honduras) Olimpia
9	FW	Patrick Palacios	29 January 2000 (aged 18)	(National Autonomous Federation of Football of Honduras) Real España
10	MF	Carlos Mejía	19 February 2000 (aged 18)	(National Autonomous Federation of Football of Honduras) Vida
11	FW	Josué Villafranca	16 December 1999 (aged 18)	(National Autonomous Federation of Football of Honduras) Motagua
12	GK	Óscar Reyes	31 January 1999 (aged 19)	(National Autonomous Federation of Football of Honduras) Vida
13	MF	Selvin Guevara	15 February 1999 (aged 19)	(National Autonomous Federation of Football of Honduras) Real España
14	MF	Séndel Cruz	13 December 1998 (aged 19)	(National Autonomous Federation of Football of Honduras) Juticalpa
15	DF	Elizon Rivas	20 November 1999 (aged 18)	(National Autonomous Federation of Football of Honduras) Real España
16	DF	José García	21 September 1998 (aged 19)	(National Autonomous Federation of Football of Honduras) Olimpia
17	DF	Wesly Decas	11 August 1999 (aged 18)	(Mexican Football Federation) Juárez
18	FW	Elvis Scott	8 January 1999 (aged 19)	(National Autonomous Federation of Football of Honduras) Platense
19	FW	Douglas Martínez	5 June 1997 (aged 21)	(National Autonomous Federation of Football of Honduras) Vida
20	MF	Gerson Chávez	31 January 2000 (aged 18)	(National Autonomous Federation of Football of Honduras) Real España

== Group B ==
=== El Salvador ===
Head Coach: (El Salvador) Alexsander Rodríguez

No.	Pos.	Player	Date of birth (age)	Club
1	GK	Walter Chiguila		(Salvadoran Football Federation) FAS
2		Josue Rivera		(Salvadoran Football Federation) FAS
3		Fernando Castillo		(Salvadoran Football Federation) FAS
4		Josue Santos		(Salvadoran Football Federation) FAS
5		Emilio Rivera		(Salvadoran Football Federation) FAS
6	DF	Roberto Domínguez		(Salvadoran Football Federation) Santa Tecla
7		Gerrardo Guirola		(Salvadoran Football Federation) Metapan
8		Amilcar Bermudez		(Salvadoran Football Federation) Firpo
9		Alexis Renderos		(Salvadoran Football Federation) Alianza F.C.
10		Bryan Landaverde		(Salvadoran Football Federation) Chalatenango
11		Kevin Cruz		(Salvadoran Football Federation) Jocoro
12		Luis Fernando Mendez		(Salvadoran Football Federation) Jocoro
13		Isai Aguilar		(Salvadoran Football Federation) Dragon
14		Marvin Marquez		(Salvadoran Football Federation) Dragon
15		Jose Alberto Guevara		(Salvadoran Football Federation) Ilopaneco
16		Osmaro Orellana		(Salvadoran Football Federation) Ilopaneco
17		Hector Osorio		(Salvadoran Football Federation) Independiente
18		Luis Canales		(Salvadoran Football Federation) Atletico Marte
19		Bryan Barrientos		(Salvadoran Football Federation) El Paraiso
20	GK	Mario Martinez	8 January 1999 (aged 19)	(Salvadoran Football Federation) C.D. Los Andes

=== Mexico ===
Head Coach: (Mexico) Marco Antonio Ruiz

No.	Pos.	Player	Date of birth (age)	Club
1	GK	Abraham Romero	18 February 1998 (aged 20)	(Mexican Football Federation) C.F. Pachuca
2	DF	Jorge Sánchez	10 December 1997 (aged 20)	(Mexican Football Federation) Santos Laguna
3	DF	José Esquivel	7 January 1998 (aged 20)	(Mexican Football Federation) C.F. Pachuca
4	DF	Carlos Vargas	14 February 1999 (aged 19)	(Mexican Football Federation) Club America
5	DF	Jair Alberto Díaz		(Mexican Football Federation) Tigres UANL
6	MF	Alan Cervantes		(Mexican Football Federation) C.D. Guadalajara
7	MF	Adrián Villalobos		(Mexican Football Federation) Leones Negros UdeG
8	MF	Francisco Córdova		(Mexican Football Federation) Club Necaxa
9	FW	Ronaldo Cisneros		(Mexican Football Federation) Zacatepec
10	FW	Eduardo Aguirre		(Mexican Football Federation) Tampico Madero F.C.
11	MF	Diego Lainez		(Mexican Football Federation) Club America
12	GK	Luis Malagón		(Mexican Football Federation) Monarcas Morelia
13	DF	Brayton Vázquez		(Mexican Football Federation) Club Atlas
14	DF	Edson García		(Mexican Football Federation) Club Atlas
15	MF	Darío Medina		(Mexican Football Federation) Querétaro F.C.
16	MF	José Ávila		(Mexican Football Federation) Club Atlas
17	MF	Paolo Yrizar		(Mexican Football Federation) Querétaro F.C.
18	FW	José Juan Macías		(Mexican Football Federation) C.D. Guadalajara
19	FW	Rafael Durán Martínez		(Mexican Football Federation) Tigres UANL
20	MF	Salvador Reyes Chávez	4 May 1998 (aged 20)	(Mexican Football Federation) Monarcas Morelia

=== Haiti ===
Head coach: (France) Jérôme Velfert

No.	Pos.	Player	Date of birth (age)	Club
		TBD		(Haitian Football Federation)
		TBD		(Haitian Football Federation)
		TBD		(Haitian Football Federation)
		TBD		(Haitian Football Federation)
		TBD		(Haitian Football Federation)
		TBD		(Haitian Football Federation)
		TBD		(Haitian Football Federation)
		TBD		(Haitian Football Federation)
		TBD		(Haitian Football Federation)
		TBD		(Haitian Football Federation)
		TBD		(Haitian Football Federation)
		TBD		(Haitian Football Federation)
		TBD		(Haitian Football Federation)
		TBD		(Haitian Football Federation)
		TBD		(Haitian Football Federation)
		TBD		(Haitian Football Federation)
		TBD		(Haitian Football Federation)
		TBD		(Haitian Football Federation)
		TBD		(Haitian Football Federation)
		TBD		(Haitian Football Federation)

=== Venezuela ===
Head coach: (Venezuela) Rafael Dudamel

No.	Pos.	Player	Date of birth (age)	Club
	GK	Joel Graterol		(Venezuelan Football Federation) Zamora
	GK	Miguel Silva		(Venezuelan Football Federation) Metropolitanos
	DF	Ronald Hernández		(Norwegian Football Federation) Stabæk
	DF	Pablo Bonilla		(Venezuelan Football Federation) Portuguesa
	DF	Jean Frank Gutiérrez		(Venezuelan Football Federation) Trujillanos
	DF	Nahuel Ferraresi		(Royal Spanish Football Federation) Girona B
	DF	Jean France Fuentes		(Venezuelan Football Federation) Estudiantes de Caracas
	DF	Luis Mago		(Venezuelan Football Federation) Carabobo
	DF	José Hernández		(United States Soccer Federation) Atlanta United
	MF	Luis Ruiz		(Venezuelan Football Federation) Aragua
	MF	Ronaldo Lucena		(Venezuelan Football Federation) Deportivo Táchira
	MF	Jorge Yriarte		(Venezuelan Football Federation) ACD Lara
	MF	Agnel Flores		(Venezuelan Football Federation) Monagas
	MF	José Baiza		(Venezuelan Football Federation) La Guaira
	MF	Herber García		(Venezuelan Football Federation) La Guaira
	MF	Daniel Saggiomo		(Venezuelan Football Federation) Caracas
	MF	Yohandry Orozco		(Colombian Football Federation) Deportes Tolima
	FW	Jesús Ramirez		(Mexican Football Federation) Veracruz
	FW	Antonio Romero		(Venezuelan Football Federation) Zamora
	FW	Ronaldo Chacón		(Venezuelan Football Federation) Caracas
