= 2017 South American U-20 Championship squads =

The 2017 South American U-20 Championship was an international association football tournament held in Ecuador. The ten national teams involved in the tournament were required to register a squad of 23 players; only players in these squads are eligible to take part in the tournament.

Each player had to have been born after 1 January 1997. All ages as of start of the tournament.

Players name marked in bold have been capped at full international level.

== Group A ==
=== Brazil ===
Head coach: Rogério Micale

No.	Pos.	Player	Date of birth (age)	Club
1	GK	Lucas Perri	10 December 1997 (aged 19)	(Brazilian Football Confederation) São Paulo
2	DF	Dodô	17 November 1998 (aged 18)	(Brazilian Football Confederation) Coritiba
3	DF	Lucas Cunha	23 January 1997 (aged 19)	(Portuguese Football Federation) Braga B
4	DF	Lyanco	1 February 1997 (aged 19)	(Brazilian Football Confederation) São Paulo
5	MF	Allan	3 March 1997 (aged 19)	(German Football Association) Hertha BSC
6	DF	**Guilherme Arana**	14 April 1997 (aged 19)	(Brazilian Football Confederation) Corinthians
7	MF	**Caio Henrique**	31 July 1997 (aged 19)	(Royal Spanish Football Federation) Atlético Madrid B
8	MF	**Douglas Luiz**	9 May 1998 (aged 18)	(Brazilian Football Confederation) Vasco da Gama
9	FW	Felipe Vizeu	12 March 1997 (aged 19)	(Brazilian Football Confederation) Flamengo
10	MF	**Lucas Paquetá**	27 August 1997 (aged 19)	(Brazilian Football Confederation) Flamengo
11	FW	**David Neres**	3 March 1997 (aged 19)	(Brazilian Football Confederation) São Paulo
12	GK	Cleiton	19 August 1997 (aged 19)	(Brazilian Football Confederation) Atlético Mineiro
13	DF	Robson Bambu	12 November 1997 (aged 19)	(Brazilian Football Confederation) Santos
14	DF	**Gabriel**	19 December 1997 (aged 19)	(Brazilian Football Confederation) Avaí
15	DF	Léo Santos	9 December 1998 (aged 18)	(Brazilian Football Confederation) Corinthians
16	DF	Rogério	13 January 1998 (aged 19)	(Italian Football Federation) Juventus Primavera
17	MF	Maycon	15 July 1997 (aged 19)	(Brazilian Football Confederation) Corinthians
18	FW	**Richarlison**	10 May 1997 (aged 19)	(Brazilian Football Confederation) Fluminense
19	FW	Léo Jabá	2 August 1998 (aged 18)	(Brazilian Football Confederation) Corinthians
20	FW	Matheus Sávio	15 April 1997 (aged 19)	(Brazilian Football Confederation) Flamengo
21	FW	Giovanny	19 July 1997 (aged 19)	(Brazilian Football Confederation) Atlético Paranaense
22	FW	Artur	15 February 1998 (aged 18)	(Brazilian Football Confederation) Palmeiras
23	GK	Caíque	31 July 1997 (aged 19)	(Brazilian Football Confederation) Vitória

=== Chile ===
Head coach: Héctor Robles

No.	Pos.	Player	Date of birth (age)	Club
1	GK	**Gonzalo Collao**	9 September 1997 (aged 19)	(Football Federation of Chile) Universidad de Chile
2	DF	Raimundo Rebolledo	14 May 1997 (aged 19)	(Football Federation of Chile) Universidad Católica
3	DF	Nicolás Ramírez	1 May 1997 (aged 19)	(Football Federation of Chile) Universidad de Chile
4	DF	Cristián Gutiérrez	18 February 1997 (aged 19)	(Football Federation of Chile) Colo-Colo
5	DF	Diego González	29 April 1998 (aged 18)	(Football Federation of Chile) O'Higgins
6	MF	**Yerko Leiva**	14 June 1998 (aged 18)	(Football Federation of Chile) Universidad de Chile
7	FW	**Víctor Dávila**	4 November 1997 (aged 19)	(Football Federation of Chile) Huachipato
8	MF	**Gabriel Suazo**	9 August 1997 (aged 19)	(Football Federation of Chile) Colo-Colo
9	FW	Richard Paredes	4 December 1997 (aged 19)	(Football Federation of Chile) Palestino
10	FW	Jeisson Vargas	15 September 1997 (aged 19)	(Argentine Football Association) Estudiantes de La Plata
11	MF	Jaime Carreño	3 March 1997 (aged 19)	(Football Federation of Chile) Universidad Católica
12	GK	Brayan Manosalva	14 January 1997 (aged 20)	(Football Federation of Chile) Huachipato
13	DF	**Francisco Sierralta**	6 May 1997 (aged 19)	(Football Federation of Chile) Palestino
14	MF	**Ángelo Araos**	6 January 1997 (aged 20)	(Football Federation of Chile) Antofagasta
15	FW	Ignacio Jara	28 January 1997 (aged 19)	(Football Federation of Chile) Cobreloa
16	FW	Felipe Fritz	23 September 1997 (aged 19)	(Football Federation of Chile) Universidad de Concepción
17	MF	Kevin Vásquez	27 June 1997 (aged 19)	(Football Federation of Chile) Santiago Wanderers
18	DF	Nozomi Kimura	23 January 1997 (aged 19)	(Football Federation of Chile) Santiago Morning
19	FW	**Iván Morales**	29 July 1999 (aged 17)	(Football Federation of Chile) Colo-Colo
20	MF	Adrián Cuadra	23 October 1997 (aged 19)	(Football Federation of Chile) Santiago Wanderers
21	MF	Carlos Lobos	21 February 1997 (aged 19)	(Football Federation of Chile) Universidad Católica
22	FW	José Luis Sierra	24 June 1997 (aged 19)	(Football Federation of Chile) Unión Española
23	GK	**Zacarías López**	30 June 1998 (aged 18)	(Football Federation of Chile) San Marcos de Arica

=== Colombia ===
Head coach: Carlos Restrepo

No.	Pos.	Player	Date of birth (age)	Club
1	GK	Luis García	20 March 1998 (aged 18)	(Royal Spanish Football Federation) Rayo Vallecano
2	DF	**Carlos Cuesta**	9 March 1999 (aged 17)	(Colombian Football Federation) Atlético Nacional
3	DF	Jorge Segura	18 January 1997 (aged 19)	(Colombian Football Federation) Envigado
4	DF	Joan Castro	13 January 1997 (aged 20)	(Colombian Football Federation) Llaneros
5	DF	Anderson Arroyo	27 September 1999 (aged 17)	(Colombian Football Federation) Fortaleza
6	MF	Daniel Rojano	25 April 1997 (aged 19)	(Colombian Football Federation) Once Caldas
7	FW	**Julián Quiñones**	24 March 1997 (aged 19)	(Mexican Football Federation) Tigres UANL
8	MF	**Kevin Balanta**	28 April 1997 (aged 19)	(Colombian Football Federation) Deportivo Cali
9	FW	Damir Ceter	2 November 1997 (aged 19)	(Colombian Football Federation) Santa Fe
10	MF	**Juan Camilo Hernández**	20 April 1999 (aged 17)	(Colombian Football Federation) América de Cali
11	FW	Michael Gómez	4 April 1997 (aged 19)	(Colombian Football Federation) Envigado
12	GK	Manuel Arias	12 December 1997 (aged 19)	(Colombian Football Federation) Cortuluá
13	MF	Éver Valencia	23 January 1997 (aged 19)	(Colombian Football Federation) Independiente Medellín
14	DF	Breiner Paz	27 September 1997 (aged 19)	(Colombian Football Federation) Millonarios
15	DF	Leyser Chaverra	1 April 1997 (aged 19)	(Colombian Football Federation) Universitario Popayán
16	MF	Christian Mina	14 April 1997 (aged 19)	(Colombian Football Federation) Deportes Quindío
17	MF	**Luis Díaz**	13 January 1997 (aged 20)	(Colombian Football Federation) Barranquilla
18	MF	Jhon Harold Balanta	16 March 1998 (aged 18)	(Colombian Football Federation) Universitario Popayán
19	FW	Jorge Obregón	29 March 1997 (aged 19)	(Colombian Football Federation) Santa Fe
20	MF	**Eduard Atuesta**	18 June 1997 (aged 19)	(Colombian Football Federation) Independiente Medellín
21	MF	Juan Pablo Ramírez	23 November 1997 (aged 19)	(Colombian Football Federation) Atlético Nacional
22	DF	Gabriel Fuentes	9 February 1997 (aged 19)	(Colombian Football Federation) Barranquilla
23	GK	Jaime Mora	12 June 1997 (aged 19)	(Colombian Football Federation) Real Santander

=== Ecuador ===
Head coach: José Javier Rodríguez Mayorga

No.	Pos.	Player	Date of birth (age)	Club
1	GK	José Gabriel Cevallos	19 March 1998 (aged 18)	(Ecuadorian Football Federation) L.D.U. Quito
2	DF	Jhonner Montezuma	11 January 1998 (aged 19)	(Ecuadorian Football Federation) Barcelona
3	DF	Joel Quintero	25 September 1998 (aged 18)	(Ecuadorian Football Federation) Emelec
4	DF	Kevin Minda	21 November 1998 (aged 18)	(Ecuadorian Football Federation) L.D.U. Quito
5	MF	Juan Nazareno	18 August 1998 (aged 18)	(Ecuadorian Football Federation) Independiente del Valle
6	DF	**Pervis Estupiñán**	21 January 1998 (aged 18)	(Royal Spanish Football Federation) Granada B
7	FW	**Washington Corozo**	9 July 1998 (aged 18)	(Ecuadorian Football Federation) Independiente del Valle
8	MF	Wilter Ayoví	17 April 1997 (aged 19)	(Ecuadorian Football Federation) Independiente del Valle
9	FW	Herlin Lino	6 February 1997 (aged 19)	(Ecuadorian Football Federation) Barcelona
10	MF	**Bryan Cabezas**	20 March 1997 (aged 19)	(Italian Football Federation) Atalanta
12	GK	Giancarlos Terreros	14 May 1998 (aged 18)	(Ecuadorian Football Federation) Barcelona
14	MF	Renny Jaramillo	12 June 1998 (aged 18)	(Ecuadorian Football Federation) Independiente del Valle
15	MF	**Jordan Sierra**	23 April 1997 (aged 19)	(Ecuadorian Football Federation) Delfín
16	MF	**Adolfo Muñoz**	12 December 1997 (aged 19)	(Ecuadorian Football Federation) El Nacional
17	MF	**Joao Rojas**	16 August 1997 (aged 19)	(Ecuadorian Football Federation) Emelec
18	DF	William Vargas	12 June 1997 (aged 19)	(Argentine Football Association) Boca Juniors
19	FW	**Jordy Caicedo**	18 November 1997 (aged 19)	(Ecuadorian Football Federation) Universidad Católica
20	MF	**Jhegson Méndez**	26 April 1997 (aged 19)	(Ecuadorian Football Federation) Independiente del Valle
21	DF	**Luis Segovia**	26 October 1997 (aged 19)	(Ecuadorian Football Federation) El Nacional
22	GK	Omar Carabalí	12 June 1997 (aged 19)	(Football Federation of Chile) Colo-Colo
23	DF	**Félix Torres**	11 January 1997 (aged 20)	(Ecuadorian Football Federation) Barcelona
11	FW	Jhon Pereira	3 September 1998 (aged 18)	(Ecuadorian Football Federation) Aucas
13	DF	**Byron Castillo**	10 November 1998 (aged 18)	(Ecuadorian Football Federation) Barcelona

Jhon Pereira (11) and Byron Castillo (13) were excluded.

=== Paraguay ===
Head coach: Pedro Sarabia

No.	Pos.	Player	Date of birth (age)	Club
1	GK	Óscar Benítez	10 July 1998 (aged 18)	(Paraguayan Football Association) Rubio Ñu
2	DF	Rodi Ferreira	29 May 1998 (aged 18)	(Paraguayan Football Association) Olimpia
3	DF	Marcelo Arce	24 March 1998 (aged 18)	(Paraguayan Football Association) Olimpia
4	DF	**Blás Riveros**	3 February 1998 (aged 18)	(Swiss Football Association) Basel
5	DF	**Saúl Salcedo**	29 August 1997 (aged 19)	(Paraguayan Football Association) Olimpia
6	MF	**Cristhian Paredes**	18 May 1998 (aged 18)	(Mexican Football Federation) América
7	FW	Julio Villalba	11 September 1998 (aged 18)	(Paraguayan Football Association) Cerro Porteño
8	MF	**Jorge Morel**	22 January 1998 (aged 18)	(Paraguayan Football Association) Guaraní
9	FW	Pedro Báez	15 January 1997 (aged 20)	(Paraguayan Football Association) Cerro Porteño
10	FW	**Josué Colmán**	25 July 1998 (aged 18)	(Paraguayan Football Association) Cerro Porteño
11	MF	**Jesús Medina**	30 April 1997 (aged 19)	(Paraguayan Football Association) Libertad
12	GK	Fabio Morán	25 January 1997 (aged 19)	(Paraguayan Football Association) Cerro Porteño
13	DF	Richard Escobar	18 January 1997 (aged 19)	(Paraguayan Football Association) Guaraní
14	DF	Ricardo Garay	7 March 1997 (aged 19)	(Paraguayan Football Association) 3 de Febrero
15	MF	Rodrigo Bogarín	24 May 1997 (aged 19)	(Paraguayan Football Association) Guaraní
16	FW	Guillermo Paiva	17 August 1997 (aged 19)	(Paraguayan Football Association) 3 de Febrero
17	FW	Leandro Flecha	5 March 1997 (aged 19)	(Paraguayan Football Association) Libertad
18	MF	**Mathías Villasanti**	24 January 1997 (aged 19)	(Paraguayan Football Association) Cerro Porteño
19	FW	**Sebastián Ferreira**	13 February 1998 (aged 18)	(Paraguayan Football Association) Olimpia
20	MF	Richard Prieto	25 January 1997 (aged 19)	(Paraguayan Football Association) General Díaz
21	DF	Sergio Ávalos	25 October 1997 (aged 19)	(Paraguayan Football Association) General Díaz
22	GK	Marino Arzamendia	19 January 1998 (aged 18)	(Paraguayan Football Association) Olimpia
23	DF	Pablo Meza	29 January 1997 (aged 19)	(Paraguayan Football Association) General Díaz

== Group B ==
=== Argentina ===
Head coach: Claudio Úbeda

No.	Pos.	Player	Date of birth (age)	Club
1	GK	Ramiro Macagno	18 March 1997 (aged 19)	(Argentine Football Association) Atlético de Rafaela
2	DF	**Cristian Romero**	27 April 1998 (aged 18)	(Argentine Football Association) Belgrano
3	DF	Milton Valenzuela	13 August 1998 (aged 18)	(Argentine Football Association) Newell's Old Boys
4	DF	**Nahuel Molina**	6 April 1998 (aged 18)	(Argentine Football Association) Boca Juniors
5	MF	**Santiago Ascacíbar**	25 February 1997 (aged 19)	(Argentine Football Association) Estudiantes
6	DF	**Lisandro Martínez**	18 January 1998 (aged 18)	(Argentine Football Association) Newell's Old Boys
7	MF	Lucas Rodríguez	27 April 1997 (aged 19)	(Argentine Football Association) Estudiantes
8	MF	Emmanuel Ojeda	5 November 1997 (aged 19)	(Argentine Football Association) Rosario Central
9	FW	**Lautaro Martínez**	22 August 1997 (aged 19)	(Argentine Football Association) Racing
10	MF	Ezequiel Barco	29 March 1999 (aged 17)	(Argentine Football Association) Independiente
11	FW	Braian Mansilla	16 April 1997 (aged 19)	(Argentine Football Association) Racing
12	GK	**Facundo Cambeses**	9 April 1997 (aged 19)	(Argentine Football Association) Banfield
13	DF	**Juan Foyth**	12 January 1998 (aged 19)	(Argentine Football Association) Estudiantes
14	DF	Nicolás Zalazar	29 January 1997 (aged 19)	(Argentine Football Association) San Lorenzo
15	MF	Franco Moyano	13 September 1997 (aged 19)	(Argentine Football Association) San Lorenzo
16	MF	Julián Chicco	13 January 1998 (aged 19)	(Argentine Football Association) Boca Juniors
17	MF	Tomás Belmonte	27 May 1998 (aged 18)	(Argentine Football Association) Lanús
18	MF	Joaquín Pereyra	1 December 1998 (aged 18)	(Argentine Football Association) Rosario Central
19	MF	**Matías Zaracho**	10 March 1998 (aged 18)	(Argentine Football Association) Racing
20	FW	Tomás Conechny	30 March 1998 (aged 18)	(Argentine Football Association) San Lorenzo
21	FW	Marcelo Torres	6 November 1997 (aged 19)	(Argentine Football Association) Boca Juniors
22	FW	Ramón Miérez	13 May 1997 (aged 19)	(Argentine Football Association) Tigre
23	GK	Franco Petroli	11 June 1998 (aged 18)	(Argentine Football Association) River Plate

=== Bolivia ===
Head coach: Marco Sandy

No.	Pos.	Player	Date of birth (age)	Club
1	GK	**Rubén Cordano**	16 October 1998 (aged 18)	(Bolivian Football Federation) Blooming
2	DF	Juan Mercado	6 January 1997 (aged 20)	(Bolivian Football Federation) Guabirá
3	MF	**José María Carrasco**	16 August 1997 (aged 19)	(Bolivian Football Federation) Blooming
4	DF	**Sebastián Reyes**	12 March 1997 (aged 19)	(Bolivian Football Federation) Petrolero
5	DF	**Luis Haquín**	15 November 1997 (aged 19)	(Bolivian Football Federation) Oriente Petrolero
6	DF	Brandon Torrico	30 September 1998 (aged 18)	(Royal Spanish Football Federation) Elche Ilicitano
7	FW	Junior Robledo	11 July 1997 (aged 19)	(Bolivian Football Federation) Blooming
8	MF	**Moisés Villarroel**	7 September 1998 (aged 18)	(Bolivian Football Federation) Bolívar
9	FW	Ronaldo Monteiro	11 January 1998 (aged 19)	(Bolivian Football Federation) Bolívar
10	MF	**Ramiro Vaca**	1 July 1999 (aged 17)	(Bolivian Football Federation) Quebracho
11	FW	**Bruno Miranda**	10 February 1998 (aged 18)	(Football Federation of Chile) Universidad de Chile
12	GK	Leonardo Claros	4 March 1998 (aged 18)	(Bolivian Football Federation) Bolívar
13	MF	Carlos Ribera	6 February 1997 (aged 19)	(Bolivian Football Federation) Guabirá
14	MF	**Carlos Daniel Roca**	11 May 1997 (aged 19)	(Bolivian Football Federation) Mariscal Sucre
15	FW	Cristhian Quintanilla	24 May 1997 (aged 19)	(Bolivian Football Federation) Aurora
16	DF	**Harry Céspedes**	21 July 1997 (aged 19)	(Bolivian Football Federation) Santa Cruz
17	MF	Marcelo Velasco	5 February 1998 (aged 18)	(Bolivian Football Federation) Blooming
18	FW	Marcos de Lima	10 June 1997 (aged 19)	(Bolivian Football Federation) Blooming
19	FW	Delfín Panique	17 February 1997 (aged 19)	(Bolivian Football Federation) Sport Boys
20	MF	**Limberg Gutiérrez**	12 June 1998 (aged 18)	(Uruguayan Football Association) Nacional
21	MF	Clovis Roca	21 September 1997 (aged 19)	(Bolivian Football Federation) Blooming
22	MF	**Henry Vaca**	27 January 1998 (aged 18)	(Football Federation of Chile) O'Higgins
23	GK	Jesús Careaga	20 May 1997 (aged 19)	(Bolivian Football Federation) San José

=== Peru ===
Head coach: (Argentina) Fernando Nogara

No.	Pos.	Player	Date of birth (age)	Club
1	GK	Pedro Ynamine	14 October 1998 (aged 18)	(Peruvian Football Federation) Universidad San Martín de Porres
2	DF	Ronaldo Andía	9 July 1997 (aged 19)	(Peruvian Football Federation) Sport Huancayo
3	DF	José Luján	12 January 1997 (aged 20)	(Peruvian Football Federation) Universidad San Martín de Porres
4	DF	**Gianfranco Chávez**	10 August 1998 (aged 18)	(Peruvian Football Federation) Sporting Cristal
5	DF	Aldair Fuentes	25 April 1998 (aged 18)	(Peruvian Football Federation) Alianza Lima
6	MF	Cristian Sánchez	5 April 1999 (aged 17)	(Peruvian Football Federation) Sporting Cristal
7	MF	**Gerald Távara**	25 March 1999 (aged 17)	(Peruvian Football Federation) Sporting Cristal
8	FW	**Bryan Reyna**	23 August 1998 (aged 18)	(Royal Spanish Football Federation) Mallorca B
9	FW	**Luis Iberico**	6 February 1998 (aged 18)	(Peruvian Football Federation) Universidad San Martín de Porres
10	MF	Raúl Tito	5 September 1997 (aged 19)	(Peruvian Football Federation) Universitario
11	MF	Roberto Siucho	7 February 1997 (aged 19)	(Peruvian Football Federation) Universitario
12	GK	Ángel Zamudio	21 April 1997 (aged 19)	(Peruvian Football Federation) Unión Comercio
13	MF	Rudy Palomino	23 July 1998 (aged 18)	(Peruvian Football Federation) Cienciano
14	MF	Miguel Castro	16 August 1997 (aged 19)	(Peruvian Football Federation) Juan Aurich
15	MF	Juan Huangal	29 January 1997 (aged 19)	(Peruvian Football Federation) Sporting Cristal
16	FW	Fernando Pacheco	26 June 1999 (aged 17)	(Peruvian Football Federation) Sporting Cristal
17	FW	**Kevin Quevedo**	22 February 1997 (aged 19)	(Peruvian Football Federation) Universitario
18	DF	Mark Estrella	1 November 1997 (aged 19)	(Peruvian Football Federation) Universidad San Martín de Porres
19	FW	**Adrián Ugarriza**	1 January 1997 (aged 20)	(Peruvian Football Federation) Universitario
20	MF	José Aldair Cotrina	8 August 1997 (aged 19)	(Peruvian Football Federation) Alianza Lima
21	GK	Carlos Gómez	18 September 1997 (aged 19)	(Peruvian Football Federation) Alianza Lima
22	FW	Rely Fernández	2 November 1997 (aged 19)	(Peruvian Football Federation) Carlos A. Mannucci
23	DF	**Marcos López**	20 November 1999 (aged 17)	(Peruvian Football Federation) Universidad San Martín de Porres

=== Uruguay ===
Head coach: Fabián Coito

No.	Pos.	Player	Date of birth (age)	Club
1	GK	**Santiago Mele**	6 September 1997 (aged 19)	(Uruguayan Football Association) Fénix
2	DF	**Santiago Bueno**	9 November 1998 (aged 18)	(Uruguayan Football Association) Peñarol
3	DF	Nicolás Rodríguez	20 August 1998 (aged 18)	(Uruguayan Football Association) Nacional
4	DF	**José Luis Rodríguez**	14 March 1997 (aged 19)	(Uruguayan Football Association) Danubio
5	DF	**Mathías Olivera**	31 October 1997 (aged 19)	(Uruguayan Football Association) Atenas
6	MF	**Marcelo Saracchi**	23 April 1998 (aged 18)	(Uruguayan Football Association) Danubio
7	FW	Joaquín Ardaiz	11 January 1999 (aged 18)	(Uruguayan Football Association) Danubio
8	MF	Carlos Benavídez	30 March 1998 (aged 18)	(Uruguayan Football Association) Defensor Sporting
9	FW	Nicolás Schiappacasse	12 January 1999 (aged 18)	(Royal Spanish Football Federation) Atlético Madrid B
10	FW	Rodrigo Amaral	25 March 1997 (aged 19)	(Uruguayan Football Association) Nacional
11	MF	**Nicolás de la Cruz**	1 June 1997 (aged 19)	(Uruguayan Football Association) Liverpool
12	GK	Francisco Tinaglini	9 November 1998 (aged 18)	(Uruguayan Football Association) River Plate
13	DF	Emanuel Gularte	30 September 1997 (aged 19)	(Uruguayan Football Association) Wanderers
14	MF	Roberto Fernández	2 March 1998 (aged 18)	(Uruguayan Football Association) Fénix
15	MF	Facundo Waller	9 April 1997 (aged 19)	(Uruguayan Football Association) Plaza Colonia
16	FW	**Diego Rossi**	5 March 1998 (aged 18)	(Uruguayan Football Association) Peñarol
17	DF	**Matías Viña**	9 November 1997 (aged 19)	(Uruguayan Football Association) Nacional
18	DF	**Agustín Rogel**	17 October 1997 (aged 19)	(Uruguayan Football Association) Nacional
19	FW	**Agustín Canobbio**	1 October 1998 (aged 18)	(Uruguayan Football Association) Fénix
20	MF	**Rodrigo Bentancur**	25 June 1997 (aged 19)	(Argentine Football Association) Boca Juniors
21	MF	Santiago Viera	4 June 1998 (aged 18)	(Uruguayan Football Association) Liverpool
22	DF	Agustín Sant'Anna	27 September 1997 (aged 19)	(Uruguayan Football Association) Cerro
23	GK	Adriano Freitas	17 June 1997 (aged 19)	(Uruguayan Football Association) Peñarol

=== Venezuela ===
Head coach: Rafael Dudamel

No.	Pos.	Player	Date of birth (age)	Club
1	GK	**Wuilker Faríñez**	18 July 1998 (aged 18)	(Venezuelan Football Federation) Caracas
2	DF	Williams Velásquez	4 April 1997 (aged 19)	(Venezuelan Football Federation) Estudiantes de Caracas
3	DF	Eduin Quero	22 April 1997 (aged 19)	(Venezuelan Football Federation) Deportivo Táchira
4	DF	**Nahuel Ferraresi**	19 November 1998 (aged 18)	(Argentine Football Association) Nueva Chicago
5	DF	José Hernández	26 June 1997 (aged 19)	(Venezuelan Football Federation) Caracas
6	MF	Christian Rivas	20 January 1997 (aged 19)	(Venezuelan Football Federation) Estudiantes de Mérida
7	FW	José Balza	10 September 1997 (aged 19)	(Venezuelan Football Federation) Carabobo
8	MF	**Yangel Herrera**	7 January 1998 (aged 19)	(Venezuelan Football Federation) Atlético Venezuela
9	FW	Ronaldo Peña	10 March 1997 (aged 19)	(Royal Spanish Football Federation) Las Palmas Atlético
10	MF	**Yeferson Soteldo**	30 June 1997 (aged 19)	(Football Federation of Chile) Huachipato
11	FW	**Ronaldo Chacón**	18 February 1998 (aged 18)	(Venezuelan Football Federation) Caracas
12	GK	**Joel Graterol**	13 February 1997 (aged 19)	(Venezuelan Football Federation) Carabobo
13	DF	Sandro Notaroberto	10 March 1998 (aged 18)	(Venezuelan Football Federation) Zulia
14	MF	Heber García	27 March 1997 (aged 19)	(Venezuelan Football Federation) Deportivo La Guaira
15	MF	Daniel Saggiomo	15 May 1997 (aged 19)	(Venezuelan Football Federation) Caracas
16	MF	**Ronaldo Lucena**	27 February 1997 (aged 19)	(Venezuelan Football Federation) Zamora
17	DF	**Josua Mejías**	9 June 1997 (aged 19)	(Venezuelan Football Federation) Carabobo
18	MF	Luis Ruiz	3 August 1997 (aged 19)	(Venezuelan Football Federation) Zulia
19	FW	Antonio Romero	16 January 1997 (aged 20)	(Venezuelan Football Federation) Deportivo Lara
20	DF	**Ronald Hernández**	21 September 1997 (aged 19)	(Venezuelan Football Federation) Zamora
21	DF	Juan García	11 October 1998 (aged 18)	(Venezuelan Football Federation) Aragua
22	GK	Rafael Sánchez	1 February 1998 (aged 18)	(Venezuelan Football Federation) Deportivo Táchira
23	MF	**Sergio Córdova**	9 August 1997 (aged 19)	(Venezuelan Football Federation) Caracas
