= Football at the 2018 Central American and Caribbean Games – Men's tournament =

2018 Central American and Caribbean Games - Men's Football Tournament
Tournament details
- Host country: Colombia
- Dates: 20 – 31 July
- Teams: 8 (from 2 confederations)
- Venue: 1 (in 1 host city)

Final positions
- Champions: Colombia (3rd title)
- Runners-up: Venezuela
- Third place: Honduras
- Fourth place: Haiti

Tournament statistics
- Matches played: 16
- Goals scored: 42 (2.63 per match)
- Top scorer(s): (Colombia) Julián Quiñones (4 goals)

The men's football tournament at the 2018 Central American and Caribbean Games was held in Barranquilla, Colombia from 20 to 31 July. Men's teams are allowed to augment their squads with three players over the age of 21.

== Participating teams ==
| Region | Tournament | Teams qualified | Number of teams |
|---|---|---|---|
| Automatically qualified | | Colombia (hosts); Mexico; Venezuela | 3 |
| Central American Football Union | 2017 Central American Games | Costa Rica; Honduras; El Salvador | 3 |
| Caribbean Football Union | 2017 CONCACAF U-20 Championship | Haiti; Trinidad and Tobago | 2 |
| Total | | | 8 |

== Squads ==
The date of birth for male athletes was from January 1, 1997 (U21). Each team could enter a maximum of three (3) male athletes without age restrictions.

== Group stage ==
Tie-breakers

- a) greatest number of points obtained in all group matches;
- b) goal difference in all group matches;
- c) greatest number of goals scored in all group matches;

If two or more teams were equal on the basis of the above three criteria, their rankings were determined as follows:

- d) greatest number of points obtained in the group matches between the teams concerned;
- e) goal difference resulting from the group matches between the teams concerned;
- f) greater number of goals scored in all group matches between the teams concerned;
- g) drawing of lots

=== Group A ===
| Pos | Team | Pld | W | D | L | GF | GA | GD | Pts | Qualification |
|---|---|---|---|---|---|---|---|---|---|---|
| 1 | Colombia (H) | 3 | 2 | 1 | 0 | 7 | 2 | +5 | 7 | Advance to knockout stage |
| 2 | Honduras | 3 | 2 | 1 | 0 | 5 | 2 | +3 | 7 | Advance to knockout stage |
| 3 | Costa Rica | 3 | 1 | 0 | 2 | 4 | 5 | −1 | 3 | |
| 4 | Trinidad and Tobago | 3 | 0 | 0 | 3 | 3 | 10 | −7 | 0 | |

Source: BAQ2018
Rules for classification: Tie-breakers
(H) Hosts
20 July 2018
16:00

| Honduras | 2–0 | Trinidad and Tobago |
|---|---|---|
| Maldonado 31'; Cruz 41' | Report |

Estadio Romelio Martínez, Barranquilla
Referee: Bryan López (Guatemala)
20 July 2018
19:00

| Colombia | 1–0 | Costa Rica |
|---|---|---|
| Mina 87' | Report |

Estadio Romelio Martínez, Barranquilla
Referee: Oshane Nation (Jamaica)

22 July 2018
16:00

| Costa Rica | 3–2 | Trinidad and Tobago |
|---|---|---|
| Leal 9', 24' (pen.); Gómez 16' | Report | Rochford 60' (pen.); Orr 67' |

Estadio Romelio Martínez, Barranquilla
Referee: Mario Escobar (Guatemala)
22 July 2018
19:00

| Colombia | 1–1 | Honduras |
|---|---|---|
| Castro 65' | Report | Martínez 40' |

Estadio Romelio Martínez, Barranquilla
Referee: Marco Ortíz (Mexico)

24 July 2018
16:00

| Costa Rica | 1–2 | Honduras |
|---|---|---|
| Gómez 7' | Report | Diego 63'; Martínez 82' |

Estadio Romelio Martínez, Barranquilla
Referee: Marco Ortíz (Mexico)
24 July 2018
19:00

| Trinidad and Tobago | 1–5 | Colombia |
|---|---|---|
| Rochford 62' | Report | Palma 44'; Sandoval 54'; Quiñones 68', 76'; Rojas 90+1' |

Estadio Romelio Martínez, Barranquilla
Referee: Gladwyn Johnson (Guyana)

=== Group B ===
| Pos | Team | Pld | W | D | L | GF | GA | GD | Pts | Qualification |
|---|---|---|---|---|---|---|---|---|---|---|
| 1 | Venezuela | 3 | 3 | 0 | 0 | 7 | 1 | +6 | 9 | Advance to knockout stage |
| 2 | Haiti | 3 | 1 | 1 | 1 | 2 | 3 | −1 | 4 | Advance to knockout stage |
| 3 | El Salvador | 3 | 1 | 0 | 2 | 1 | 4 | −3 | 3 | |
| 4 | Mexico | 3 | 0 | 1 | 2 | 2 | 4 | −2 | 1 | |

Source: BAQ2018
Rules for classification: Tie-breakers
21 July 2018
16:00

| El Salvador | 0–1 | Haiti |
|---|---|---|
| | Report | Jean Jacques 28' |

Estadio Romelio Martínez, Barranquilla
Referee: Juan Gabriel Calderón (Costa Rica)
21 July 2018
19:00

| Mexico | 1–2 | Venezuela |
|---|---|---|
| Aguirre 42' (pen.) | Report | Orozco 50'; Romero 64' |

Estadio Romelio Martínez, Barranquilla
Referee: Saíd Martínez (Honduras)

23 July 2018
16:00

| Venezuela | 2–0 | Haiti |
|---|---|---|
| Orozco 36'; Saggiomo 38' | Report |

Estadio Romelio Martínez, Barranquilla
Referee: José Kellys (Panama)
23 July 2018
19:00

| Mexico | 0–1 | El Salvador |
|---|---|---|
| | Report | Márquez 74' |

Estadio Romelio Martínez, Barranquilla
Referee: Daneon Parchment (Jamaica)

25 July 2018
16:00

| Venezuela | 3–0 | El Salvador |
|---|---|---|
| Romero 29'; Saggiomo 45'; Chacón 90' | Report |

Estadio Romelio Martínez, Barranquilla
Referee: Bryan López (Guatemala)
25 July 2018
19:00

| Haiti | 1–1 | Mexico |
|---|---|---|
| Damus 35' (pen.) | Report | Aguirre 11' |

Estadio Romelio Martínez, Barranquilla
Referee: Saíd Martínez (Honduras)

== Knockout stage ==
If necessary, extra time and a penalty shoot-out were used to decide the winner.

Semi-finals
28 July — Barranquilla (Romelio Martínez)
Colombia | 3
Haiti | 1
28 July — Barranquilla (Romelio Martínez)
Venezuela | 1
Honduras | 0

Gold medal match
31 July — Barranquilla (Romelio Martínez)
Colombia | 2
Venezuela | 1
Bronze medal match
31 July — Barranquilla (Romelio Martínez)
Haiti | 0
Honduras | 3

=== Semi-finals ===
28 July 2018
16:00

| Venezuela | 1–0 | Honduras |
|---|---|---|
| Flores 76' | Report |

Estadio Romelio Martínez, Barranquilla
Referee: Oshane Nation (Jamaica)

28 July 2018
19:00

| Colombia | 3–1 | Haiti |
|---|---|---|
| Quiñones 71', 90+1' (pen.); Sandoval 84' | Report | Damus 60' |

Estadio Romelio Martínez, Barranquilla
Referee: Mario Escobar (Guatemala)

=== Bronze medal match ===
31 July 2018
17:00

| Haiti | 0–3 | Honduras |
|---|---|---|
| | Report | Cálix 8'; Villafranca 45+2'; Martínez 76' (pen.) |

Estadio Romelio Martínez, Barranquilla
Referee: José Kellys (Panama)

=== Gold medal match ===
31 July 2018
20:00

| Colombia | 2–1 | Venezuela |
|---|---|---|
| Gutiérrez 12' (o.g.); Castro 32' | Report | Orozco 35' |

Estadio Romelio Martínez, Barranquilla
Referee: Marco Ortíz (Mexico)

== Goalscorers ==
There were 42 goals scored in 16 matches, for an average of 2.62 goals per match.

4 goals

- (Colombia) Julián Quiñones

3 goals

- (Honduras) Douglas Martínez
- (Venezuela) Yohandry Orozco

2 goals

- (Colombia) Leonardo Fabio Castro
- (Colombia) Luis Sandoval
- (Costa Rica) Andrés Gómez
- (Costa Rica) Randall Leal
- (Haiti) Ronaldo Damus
- (Mexico) Eduardo Aguirre
- (Trinidad and Tobago) John-Paul Rochford
- (Venezuela) Daniel Saggiomo
- (Venezuela) Antonio Romero

1 goal

- (Colombia) Christian Mina
- (Colombia) Juan Palma
- (Colombia) Iván Rojas
- (El Salvador) Marvin Márquez
- (Haiti) Danley Jean Jacques
- (Honduras) Cristian Cálix
- (Honduras) Séndel Cruz
- (Honduras) Darwin Diego
- (Honduras) Denil Maldonado
- (Honduras) Josué Villafranca
- (Trinidad and Tobago) Nickel Orr
- (Venezuela) Ronaldo Chacón
- (Venezuela) Agnel Flores

1 own goal

- (Venezuela) Jean Gutiérrez (against Colombia)
