= Danny Pérez =

Venezuelan footballer (born 2000)

Personal information
- Full name: Danny Marcos Pérez Valdéz
- Date of birth: 23 January 2000 (age 26)
- Place of birth: Caracas, Venezuela
- Height: 1.79 m (5 ft 10 1/2 in)
- Position: Forward

Team information
- Current team: Gnistan
- Number: 11

Youth career
- 2012–2017: Deportivo La Guaira

Senior career*
Years	Team	Apps	(Gls)
2017	Deportivo La Guaira	4	(0)
2018	Zamora	22	(7)
2018–2022	Deportes La Serena	11	(1)
2018	→ Colo-Colo (loan)	0	(0)
2019	→ Huachipato (loan)	8	(0)
2021	→ Deportivo Lara (loan)	15	(3)
2022	→ Zamora (loan)	30	(5)
2023	Academia Puerto Cabello	32	(6)
2024	Caracas	23	(1)
2025	Real Tomayapo	26	(4)
2026–	Gnistan	29	(3)

International career^{‡}
2017	Venezuela U17	8	(0)
2018	Venezuela U20	2	(1)
- * Club domestic league appearances and goals as of 13 November 2026 ‡ National team caps and goals as of 23 December 2018

Danny Marcos Pérez Valdéz (born 23 January 2000) is a Venezuelan footballer who plays as a forward for Gnistan in Veikkausliiga.

== Career statistics ==
=== Club ===
As of 23 December 2018.

Club	Season	League			Cup		Continental		Other		Total	
Club	Season	Division	Apps	Goals	Apps	Goals	Apps	Goals	Apps	Goals	Apps	Goals
Deportivo La Guaira	2017	Venezuelan Primera División	4	0	1 (Note: Appearances in the Copa Venezuela)	0	–		0	0	5	0
Zamora	2018	Venezuelan Primera División	22	7	0	0	2 (Note: Appearances in the Copa Sudamericana)	0	0	0	24	7
Deportes La Serena	2018	Primera B de Chile	0	0	0	0	–		0	0	0	0
Colo-Colo (loan)	2018	Chilean Primera División	0	0	0	0	0	0	0	0	0	0
Career total			26	7	1	0	2	0	0	0	29	7
