= Luis Ruiz =

Luis Ruiz may refer to:

- Luis Ruiz Tagle (1898–?), Chilean sports shooter
- Luis Ruiz Suárez (1913–2011), Spanish missionary
- Luis Ruiz (footballer, born 1987), Colombian footballer
- Luis Ruiz (footballer, born 1992), Spanish footballer
- Luis Ruiz (footballer, born 1997), Venezuelan footballer
- Luis Ruiz (Oz), a character on the TV series Oz
- Luis Edmundo Ruiz (died 2015), Chilean administrator and public official
