= Eduardo Herrera =

Eduardo Herrera may refer to:

- Eduardo Herrera (golfer) (born 1965), Colombian golfer
- Eduardo Herrera (footballer, born 1988), Mexican footballer
- Eduardo Mendoza Herrera (born 1993), Mexican footballer
- Eduardo Herrera (Chilean footballer) (born 1944)
- Eduardo Herrera (Venezuelan footballer) (born 1993), Venezuelan football goalkeeper
- Eduardo Lagos Herrera, Chilean politician
- Eduardo Herrera (runner) (born 1997), Mexican middle- and long-distance runner
