= Anthony Uribe =

Venezuelan footballer (born 1990)

Personal information
- Full name: Anthony Chelín Uribe Francia
- Date of birth: 24 October 1990 (age 36)
- Place of birth: La Guaira, Venezuela
- Height: 1.81 m (5 ft 11 1/2 in)
- Position: Forward

Team information
- Current team: Deportivo La Guaira
- Number: 9

Senior career*
Years	Team	Apps	(Gls)
2008–2009	Caracas B	16	(8)
2009–2017	Caracas	33	(7)
2010	→ Llaneros (loan)	4	(0)
2012–2016	→ Atlético Venezuela (loan)	109	(25)
2017–2019	Zamora	44	(20)
2019	→ Belgrano (loan)	2	(0)
2019–2021	Rionegro Águilas	35	(6)
2021–2024	Deportivo Táchira	102	(21)
2025–	Deportivo La Guaira	34	(8)
- * Club domestic league appearances and goals as of 10 March 2026

Anthony Chelín Uribe Francia (born 24 October 1990) is a Venezuelan professional footballer who plays as a forward for Deportivo La Guaira.

== Career ==
Uribe began featuring for Caracas B in the Segunda División in 2008, subsequently scoring eight goals in sixteen appearances. In 2009, Uribe moved up to the club's senior team in the Venezuelan Primera División. One goal in five matches followed in the 2009–10 campaign which Caracas ended as champions. He played for two further seasons, via a loan with Llaneros, adding six goals to his tally. In June 2012, Atlético Venezuela completed the loan signing of Uribe. He ended up remaining for five campaigns in the top-flight, notching twenty-five goals in one hundred and twenty fixtures in all competitions.

Ahead of the 2017 Venezuelan Primera División, Uribe joined reigning champions Zamora. He scored twenty-two times across 2017 and 2018, including braces against Atlético Socopó, Deportivo Táchira, Metropolitanos and, on two occasions, Portuguesa. In January 2019, Uribe departed his homeland to join Argentine Primera División side Belgrano on loan. After just three appearances in all competitions for Belgrano, Uribe went on to join Rionegro Águilas in Colombia. He scored three goals in his first three league fixtures, netting against Junior, América de Cali and Independiente Medellín in August 2019.

In June 2020, Uribe left Rionegro Águilas after the expiration of his contract. However, in the succeeding January, Uribe made a return to the club; having been without a club since his departure.

== Career statistics ==
As of 02:05, 03 April 2021 (UTC)..

Club statistics
Club	Season	League			Cup		Continental		Other		Total	
Club	Season	Division	Apps	Goals	Apps	Goals	Apps	Goals	Apps	Goals	Apps	Goals
Caracas B	2008–09	Segunda División	16	8	—		—		0	0	16	8
Caracas	2009–10	Venezuelan Primera División	5	1	0	0	0	0	0	0	5	1
Caracas	2010–11	Venezuelan Primera División	12	2	0	0	0	0	0	0	12	2
Caracas	2011–12	Venezuelan Primera División	16	4	0	0	2 (Note: Appearance(s) in the Copa Libertadores)	0	0	0	18	4
Caracas	2012–13	Venezuelan Primera División	0	0	0	0	0	0	0	0	0	0
Caracas	2013–14	Venezuelan Primera División	0	0	0	0	0	0	0	0	0	0
Caracas	2014–15	Venezuelan Primera División	0	0	0	0	0	0	0	0	0	0
Caracas	2015	Venezuelan Primera División	0	0	0	0	—		0	0	0	0
Caracas	2016	Venezuelan Primera División	0	0	0	0	0	0	0	0	0	0
Caracas	Total		33	7	0	0	2	0	0	0	35	7
Llaneros (loan)	2009–10	Venezuelan Primera División	4	0	0	0	—		0	0	4	0
Atlético Venezuela (loan)	2012–13	Venezuelan Primera División	23	3	0	0	—		0	0	23	3
Atlético Venezuela (loan)	2013–14	Venezuelan Primera División	23	4	0	0	—		2 (Note: Appearance(s) in the Venezuelan Primera División play-offs)	0	25	4
Atlético Venezuela (loan)	2014–15	Venezuelan Primera División	30	6	0	0	—		2	0	32	6
Atlético Venezuela (loan)	2015	Venezuelan Primera División	17	5	0	0	—		0	0	17	5
Atlético Venezuela (loan)	2016	Venezuelan Primera División	16	7	3	0	—		4	0	23	7
Atlético Venezuela (loan)	Total		109	25	3	0	—		8	0	120	25
Zamora	2017	Venezuelan Primera División	20	6	7	5	5	1	4	0	36	12
Zamora	2018	Venezuelan Primera División	24	14	6	3	2 (Note: Appearance(s) in the Copa Sudamericana)	0	6	2	38	19
Zamora	2019	Venezuelan Primera División	0	0	0	0	0	0	0	0	0	0
Zamora	Total		44	20	13	8	7	1	10	2	74	31
Belgrano (loan)	2018–19	Argentine Primera División	2	0	1	0	—		0	0	3	0
Rionegro Águilas	2019	Categoría Primera A	13	5	0	0	0	0	0	0	13	5
Rionegro Águilas	2020	Categoría Primera A	8	1	0	0	—		0	0	8	1
Rionegro Águilas	2021	Categoría Primera A	12	0	0	0	—		0	0	12	0
Rionegro Águilas	Total		33	6	0	0	—		0	0	33	6
Career total			241	66	17	8	9	1	18	2	285	77

== Honours ==
Caracas

- Venezuelan Primera División: 2009–10

Zamora

- Venezuelan Primera División: 2018 liberdade
