= Cristian Díaz =

Cristian Díaz may refer to:

- Cristian Díaz (footballer, born 1976), Argentine former football defender
- Cristian Díaz (footballer, born 1986), Argentine football forward
- Cristian Díaz (footballer, born 1989), Argentine former football defender
- Cristian Díaz (footballer, born 1993), Venezuelan football forward
- Christian Díaz (born 1976), Argentine former football defender and manager
