= Football at the 2018 Central American and Caribbean Games =

2018 Central American and Caribbean Games Football Tournament

Tournament details
- Host country: Colombia
- Dates: 19 – 31 July
- Teams: 8 (men's) + 8 (women's) (from 2 confederations)
- Venue: 2 (in 1 host city)

Final positions
- Champions: Colombia (men's); Mexico (women's)
- Runners-up: Venezuela (men's); Costa Rica (women's)
- Third place: Honduras (men's); Venezuela (women's)
- Fourth place: Haiti (men's); Trinidad and Tobago (women's)

The 2018 Central American and Caribbean Games football tournament was the 21st edition of the competition at the 21st edition of the Central American and Caribbean Games.

Colombia won the gold in the men's tournament, while Mexico won the gold in the women's tournament.

== Men's event ==
Although the competition is considered to be an under-21 age group competition, up to three players born before 1 January 1997 may be named in the squad. Each participating national football association will select a final squad of 20 players.

=== Group stage ===
==== Group A ====
Pos	Team	Pld	W	D	L	GF	GA	GD	Pts	Qualification
1	Colombia (H)	3	2	1	0	7	2	+5	7	Advance to knockout stage
2	Honduras	3	2	1	0	5	2	+3	7	Advance to knockout stage
3	Costa Rica	3	1	0	2	4	5	−1	3	
4	Trinidad and Tobago	3	0	0	3	3	10	−7	0	

Source: BAQ2018
Rules for classification: Tie-breakers
(H) Hosts

==== Group B ====
Pos	Team	Pld	W	D	L	GF	GA	GD	Pts	Qualification
1	Venezuela	3	3	0	0	7	1	+6	9	Advance to knockout stage
2	Haiti	3	1	1	1	2	3	−1	4	Advance to knockout stage
3	El Salvador	3	1	0	2	1	4	−3	3	
4	Mexico	3	0	1	2	2	4	−2	1	

Source: BAQ2018
Rules for classification: Tie-breakers

=== Knockout stage ===
Semi-finals
28 July — Barranquilla (Romelio Martínez)
Colombia	3
Haiti	1
28 July — Barranquilla (Romelio Martínez)
Venezuela	1
Honduras	0

Gold medal match
31 July — Barranquilla (Romelio Martínez)
Colombia	2
Venezuela	1
Bronze medal match
31 July — Barranquilla (Romelio Martínez)
Haiti	0
Honduras	3

== Women's event ==
There are no age restrictions. Each participating national football association will select a final squad of 20 players.

=== Group stage ===
==== Group A ====
Pos	Team	Pld	W	D	L	GF	GA	GD	Pts	Qualification
1	Costa Rica	3	3	0	0	5	2	+3	9	Advance to knockout stage
2	Venezuela	3	1	0	2	5	6	−1	3	Advance to knockout stage
3	Jamaica	3	1	0	2	4	5	−1	3	
4	Colombia (H)	3	1	0	2	4	5	−1	3	

Source: BAQ2018
Rules for classification: Tie-breakers
(H) Hosts

==== Group B ====
Pos	Team	Pld	W	D	L	GF	GA	GD	Pts	Qualification
1	Mexico	3	3	0	0	12	1	+11	9	Advance to knockout stage
2	Trinidad and Tobago	3	1	1	1	6	7	−1	4	Advance to knockout stage
3	Nicaragua	3	1	1	1	5	6	−1	4	
4	Haiti	3	0	0	3	0	9	−9	0	Withdrew

Source: BAQ2018
Rules for classification: Tie-breakers

=== Knockout stage ===
Semi-finals
27 July — Barranquilla (Julio Torres)
Costa Rica	2
Trinidad and Tobago	0
27 July — Barranquilla (Julio Torres)
Mexico	3
Venezuela	1

Gold medal match
30 July — Barranquilla (Julio Torres)
Costa Rica	1
Mexico	3
Bronze medal match
30 July — Barranquilla (Julio Torres)
Trinidad and Tobago	0
Venezuela	1

== Medal table ==
* Host nation (Colombia)

Rank	Nation	Gold	Silver	Bronze	Total
1	Colombia (COL)*	1	0	0	1
1	Mexico (MEX)	1	0	0	1
3	Venezuela (VEN)	0	1	1	2
4	Costa Rica (CRC)	0	1	0	1
5	Honduras (HON)	0	0	1	1
Totals (5 entries)		2	2	2	6
