= Edwuin Pernía =

Venezuelan footballer (born 1995)

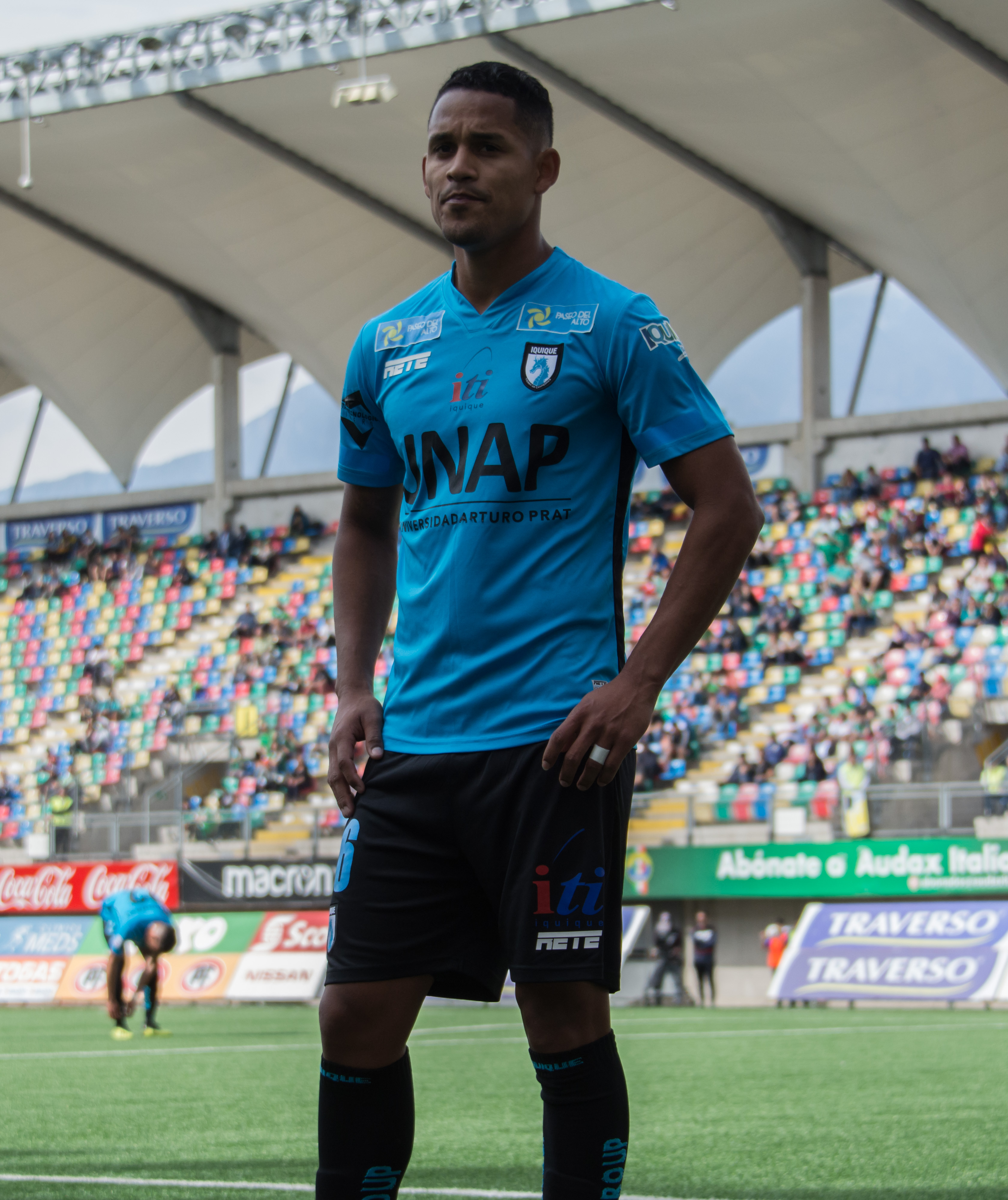
- Pernía in 2018

Personal information
- Full name: Edwuin Alexander Pernía Martínez
- Date of birth: 12 February 1995 (age 31)
- Place of birth: San Juan de los Morros, Venezuela
- Height: 1.78 m (5 ft 10 in)
- Position: Forward

Team information
- Current team: Academia Puerto Cabello

Youth career
- –2015: Ortiz

Senior career*
Years	Team	Apps	(Gls)
2015–2022	Caracas	45	(18)
2018–2019	→ Deportes Iquique (loan)	23	(11)
2019–2020	→ Emelec (loan)	17	(4)
2021–2022	→ Deportes Iquique (loan)	35	(11)
2022–2023	Deportes Santa Cruz	23	(6)
2024	Caracas	30	(14)
2025	San Martín SJ	7	(0)
2025-	Academia Puerto Cabello	0	(0)
- * Club domestic league appearances and goals as of 18:26, 15 February 2025 (UTC)

Edwuin Alexander Pernía Martínez (born 12 February 1995) is a Venezuelan footballer who plays as a forward for Academia Puerto Cabello.

== Career statistics ==
As of 23 December 2018

Appearances and goals by club, season and competition
Club	Season	League			Cup		Continental		Other		Total	
Club	Season	Division	Apps	Goals	Apps	Goals	Apps	Goals	Apps	Goals	Apps	Goals
Caracas	2015	Venezuelan Primera División	2	0	0	0	–		0	0	2	0
Caracas	2016	Venezuelan Primera División	2	0	0	0	–		0	0	2	0
Caracas	2017	Venezuelan Primera División	22	7	2 (Note: Appearances in the Copa Venezuela)	3	0	0	0	0	24	10
Caracas	2018	Venezuelan Primera División	19	11	0	0	2 (Note: Appearances in the Copa Sudamericana)	1	0	0	21	12
Caracas	Total		45	18	2	3	2	1	0	0	49	22
Deportes Iquique (loan)	2018	Chilean Primera División	14	6	0	0	–		0	0	14	6
Career total			59	24	2	3	2	1	0	0	63	28
