= Cristian Díaz (footballer, born 1993) =

Venezuelan footballer

Personal information
- Full name: Cristian Arley Díaz Rincón
- Date of birth: 18 January 1993 (age 33)
- Place of birth: Venezuela
- Position: Forward

Youth career
- 2007–2011: Deportivo Táchira

Senior career*
Years	Team	Apps	(Gls)
2011–2012	Deportivo Táchira B		
2012	Deportivo Táchira	6	(1)
2013	Lotería del Táchira		
- * Club domestic league appearances and goals

Cristian Arley Díaz Rincón (born 18 January 1993) is a Venezuelan footballer who plays as a forward. He is currently a free agent.

== Career ==
Deportivo Táchira were Díaz's first senior club, having joined their youth system in 2007. After appearing in the professional tier two with their reserve team, the forward made his debut for the first-team side on 29 April 2012 during a Venezuelan Primera División draw against Yaracuyanos. He was selected twice more in the 2011–12 season. Díaz scored his first senior goal in the following September, netting the only goal in a 1–0 win over Estudiantes de Mérida at the Estadio Polideportivo de Pueblo Nuevo. Díaz departed Deportivo Táchira in January 2013, subsequently agreeing to join Lotería del Táchira of the Venezuelan Segunda División.

== Career statistics ==
As of 4 December 2018.

Club statistics
Club	Season	League			Cup (Note: Includes the Copa Venezuela)		League Cup		Continental (Note: Includes the Copa Libertadores and Copa Sudamericana)		Other		Total	
Club	Season	Division	Apps	Goals	Apps	Goals	Apps	Goals	Apps	Goals	Apps	Goals	Apps	Goals
Deportivo Táchira	2011–12	Primera División	3	0	0	0	—		0	0	0	0	3	0
Deportivo Táchira	2012–13	Primera División	3	1	0	0	—		0	0	0	0	3	1
Career total			6	1	0	0	—		0	0	0	0	6	1
