= Pedro Depablos =

Venezuelan footballer (born 1977)

Personal information
- Full name: Pedro Javier Depablos Jacobo
- Date of birth: 2 January 1977 (age 49)
- Place of birth: San Cristóbal, Táchira
- Height: 1.80 m (5 ft 11 in)
- Position: Forward

Senior career*
Years	Team	Apps	(Gls)
1996	Deportivo Táchira		
1997	Cóndor		
1997	La Equidad		
1998–1999	Santa Fe		
2000	Cúcuta Deportivo		
2001	Zulianos		
2002–2003	Maracaibo		
2003–2004	Deportivo Táchira		
2004–2005	Italmaracaibo		
2005–2007	Caracas		
2007–2008	Aragua		
2008	Estudiantes de Mérida		
2008–2009	Guaros		
2009–2011	Deportivo Lara		
2011–2012	Atlético El Vigía		

International career
1999–2004	Venezuela	2	(0)

Managerial career
- 2012: Zamora (assistant)
- 2013: Deportivo Táchira B (assistant)
- 2014: Deportivo Táchira (assistant)
- 2017–2018: Deportivo La Guaira
- 2018–2019: Academia Puerto Cabello
- 2019: Venezuela U23 (assistant)
- 2020–2022: Bolivia (assistant)
- 2022–2023: Aucas (assistant)
- 2023: Águilas Doradas (assistant)
- 2024: América de Cali (assistant)
- 2024: Llaneros
- 2025: Águilas Doradas
- 2025: San Antonio Bulo Bulo
- * Club domestic league appearances and goals

Pedro Javier Depablos Jacobo (born 2 January 1977) is a Venezuelan football manager and former player who played as a forward.

Depablos played in one match for the Venezuela national football team in 2004. He was also part of Venezuela's squad for the 2004 Copa América tournament.
