= José Hernández (footballer, born August 1996) =

Venezuelan footballer

Personal information
- Full name: José Manuel Hernández Chávez
- Date of birth: 2 August 1996 (age 30)
- Place of birth: Zulia, Venezuela
- Height: 1.79 m (5 ft 10 in)
- Position: Winger

Team information
- Current team: Academia Puerto Cabello
- Number: 31

Senior career*
Years	Team	Apps	(Gls)
2013–2014	Aragua	2	(0)
2015–2020	Truijillanos	79	(20)
2018–2019	→ Monagas (loan)	27	(6)
2021	Envigado	33	(5)
2021–2022	Independiente Medellín	24	(0)
2022–2023	La Equidad	13	(2)
2023	Deltras	5	(1)
2024–2025	Caracas	22	(8)
2026–	Academia Puerto Cabello	15	(2)

International career^{‡}
2025–	Venezuela	2	(0)
- * Club domestic league appearances and goals as of 8 June 2026 ‡ National team caps and goals as of 18 November 2025

José Manuel Hernández Chávez (born 2 August 1996) is a Venezuelan professional footballer who plays as a winger for Academia Puerto Cabello and the Venezuela national team.

== Club career ==
=== Envigado ===
Born in Zulia, Venezuela, he joined several local Venezuelan clubs, and finally decided to go abroad for the first time to Colombia and joined Envigado in the 2021 season. He made his league debut on 3 February 2021 in a match against Jaguares de Córdoba. On 18 February 2021, he scored his first league goal for Envigado, as they drew 1–1 against Águilas Doradas Rionegro. On 23 August 2021, he scored a brace for the club in a 0–2 away win against Deportivo Pasto at Estadio Departamental Libertad.

=== Independiente Medellín ===
On 20 December 2021, Hernández signed a contract with Independiente Medellín, he was transferred from Envigado. He made his league debut on 24 January 2022 in a 1–0 win against Deportes Tolima.

=== La Equidad ===
Ahead 2023 season, it was confirmed that Hernández and other players would join La Equidad. He made his league debut on 20 February 2023 in a 0–1 home lose against Independiente Santa Fe. On 19 April 2023, He give assists a goal by Ederson Moreno in Equidad's 1–1 draw over Jaguares de Córdoba. On 6 May 2023, he scored his first league goal for La Equidad, as they drew 1–1 against Águilas Doradas Rionegro. On 13 May 2023, Hernández scored the winning goal in a 1–0 home win against Atlético Bucaramanga. He contributed with 13 league appearances, scored 2 goals.

=== Deltras ===
Ahead of the 2023–24 season, Hernández decided to Indonesia and signed a contract with Liga 2 club Deltras.

== Career statistics ==
=== International ===
As of match played 18 November 2025

Appearances and goals by national team and year
National team	Year	Apps	Goals
Venezuela	2025	2	0
Total		2	0
