= José Francisco González =

Venezuelan footballer (born 1971)

José "Patón" González (born 21 July 1971) is a Venezuelan football manager and former player who played as a defender.

== Clubs ==
- Deportivo Táchira 1990–1996
- Everton 1997
- Universidad de Concepción 1998
- Deportivo Táchira 1999–2004
- Unión Atlético Maracaibo 2005–2006
- Zamora 2006
- Estudiantes de Mérida 2007
- Deportivo Táchira 2007–2009
- Deportivo Anzoátegui 2009–2012
