= Francisco Velásquez =

Dominican painter

- Born: c. 1750-1790; Santo Domingo, Dominican Republic
- Died: 1822-1830; Dominican Republic
- Known for: Painting

Francisco Velásquez (17??-18??) was a Dominican painter during the colonial period and one of the few early colonial native artists whose works and legacy survive today. Velásquez is noted as the painter of the twelve apostles that adorn the chapel of the sacrament of the old Cathedral Primada. Known as medallions for their oval shape, his paintings represent apostles Peter, Andrew, James (the son of Zebedee), John, Philip, Bartholomew, Thomas, Matthew, James), Thaddaeus, Simon, and Judas Iscariot.

== Biography ==
Velásquez was a criollo artist born in Santo Domingo, in the last half of the 18th century and died between 1822 and 1830. Completely self-taught, he painted using crude mixtures of colors that he made using materials from the earth, excelling as a painter of portraits "that he drew without the need to have the person in view at the time of portraying them." This is from his biographer, José María Morillas who recounts that in order to make a portrait of Archbishop Valera (1814–1833), who refused to be painted, his relatives gave the artist the opportunity to see him while he prayed. Throughout his career, Velásquez painted portraits of more well-to-do and high-ranking people. His reputation as a skilled portraitist on the island led him to Haiti, where he was patroned by Henri Christophe, the ruler of the Kingdom of Haiti, between 1806 and 1820, to make portraits of himself along with members of his family and magnates of the royal court. Velásquez also decorated the palatial spaces of Sans-Souci Palace with the theme of mythological gods, reinterpreted "with Ethiopian color and features." Taking into account that Velásquez developed in the last decades of the changing colonial regime of Santo Domingo (1795–1821), it is most likely that many of his portraits from this period are preserved as anonymous paintings, considering he did not sign his works.

He is best known for painting the medallions of the apostles hung in the chapel of the Blessed Sacrament of the Primada Cathedral. They are paintings worked directly on cedar boards, without intermediate technique on the support. These paintings were specifically made for the Chapel of the Blessed Sacrament, considering twelve of them adjust their size to the side walls and the other two that complete the total of fourteen have the measurements required by the back wall.

An English chronicler, William Walton, cites Velásquez's name and his works in a book published in 1810. Walton refers to the paintings of the apostles that he saw in the chapel, "The Chapel of the Sacrament has a small ceiling or cupola painted in sections and is ornamented with large paintings of the twelve apostles by Velásquez, a native painter residing here, whose talent without the help of any school is especially noticeable in the copies of resemblances, which he achieves with the greatest precision imaginable, although his color mixing is crude."

Walton was in the territory of Hispañola, forming part of the military squads that his native England mobilized in the Caribbean, when the conflicts relating to the Saint Domingue revolution, also known as the Haitian Revolution (1789-1804), arose. He was captured by the French in Santo Domingo, which Spain had ceded to France in the Treaty of Basel (1795). It was during this time that he gathered materials regarding the eastern side of the island, the once-Spanish colony, for his essay in which he states the painter Velásquez as the creator of the paintings of the twelve apostles located in one of the chapels of the cathedral.

Due to the fact that native artists from the colonies did not sign their works regularly, many of Velasquez's works have been passed down as anonymous works. More information on colonial works and performances perhaps recorded in documents also have been lost due to different destructions that have occurred; for instance, the archives of the Cathedral of Santo Domingo were burned by Francis Drake in the sixteenth century, or disappeared in other periods due to various circumstances. Walton writes that upon the transfer to France (1795) "several convents were abandoned by its inhabitants with the change of flag, remaining in a state of abandonment for several years. The French turned many precincts into barracks, hospitals, warehouses, and a church into a theater. Later they were inhabited by poor people, whose wooden houses were burned and destroyed during the siege. Its wide patios and damp corridors, once traversed by vestals, are now littered with garbage and mold, more from carelessness than from the devastating action of time."

== Gallery ==
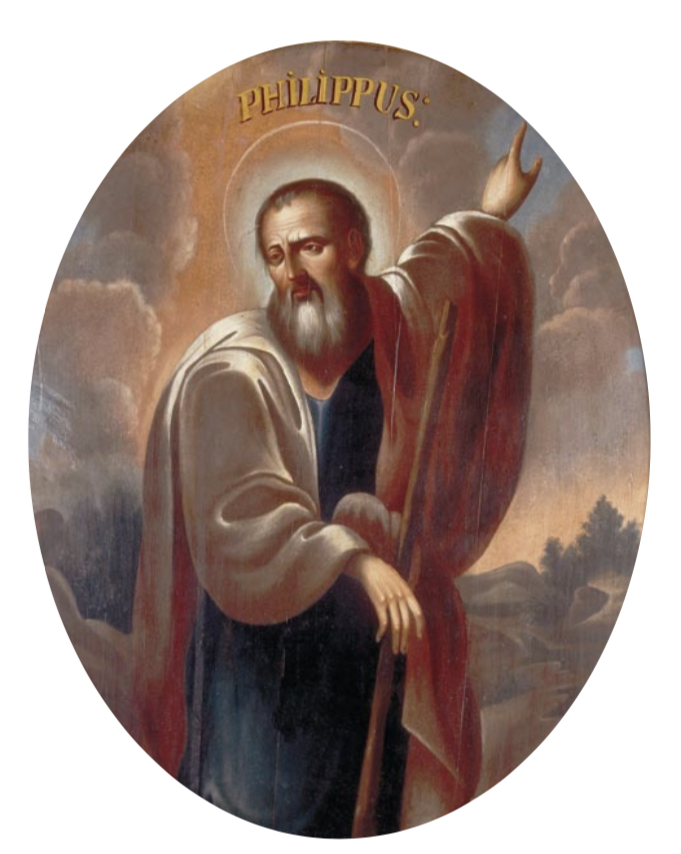
Philip the Apostle. Francisco Velásquez, 18th century

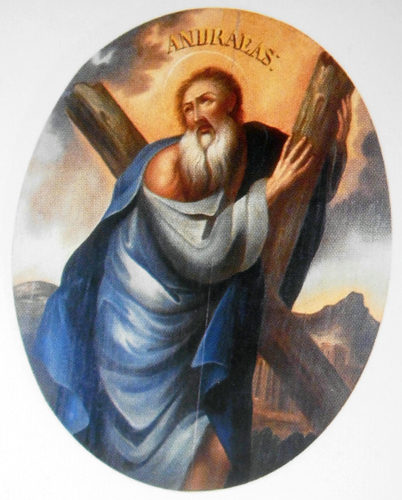
San Andrés. Velázquez, Francisco. 1700-1799

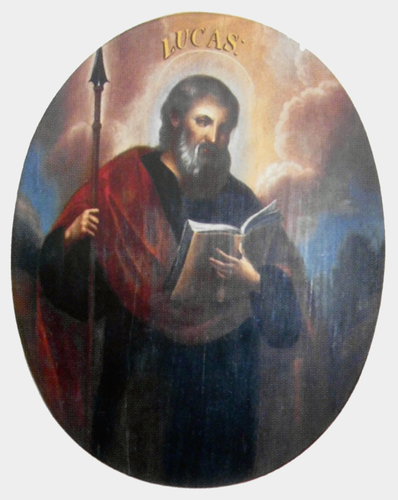
San Lucas, Velázquez, Francisco. 1700-1799
