= Nicolás Ramírez (Chilean footballer) =

Chilean footballer (born 1997)

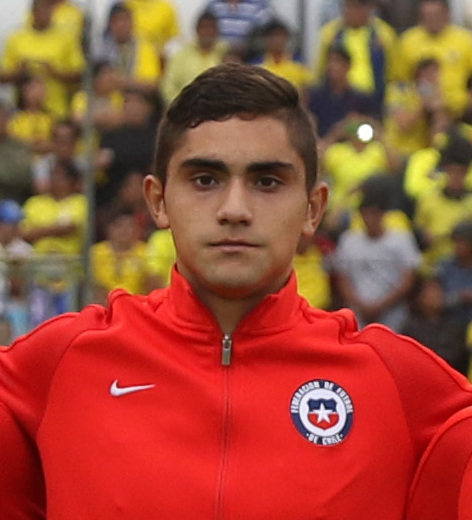
- Ramírez with Chile U20 in 2017

Personal information
- Full name: Nicolás Enrique Ramírez Aguilera
- Date of birth: May 1, 1997 (age 29)
- Place of birth: Santiago, Chile
- Height: 1.82 m (5 ft 11 1/2 in)
- Position: Centre back

Team information
- Current team: Universidad de Chile

Youth career
- Universidad de Chile

Senior career*
Years	Team	Apps	(Gls)
2014–2019	Universidad de Chile	11	(0)
2017–2018	→ Deportes Temuco (loan)	26	(0)
2019	→ Huachipato (loan)	13	(1)
2020–2023	Huachipato	95	(1)
2024	Barcelona SC	20	(0)
2025–	Universidad de Chile	0	(0)

International career^{‡}
2017	Chile U20	4	(0)
2019–2020	Chile U23	6	(0)
- * Club domestic league appearances and goals as of 15 January 2025 ‡ National team caps and goals as of 21:18, 5 March 2021 (UTC)

Nicolás Enrique Ramírez Aguilera (born 1 May 1997) is a Chilean footballer who plays as a central defender for Universidad de Chile.

== Club career ==
In 2024, Ramírez moved abroad and signed with Barcelona in the Ecuadorian Serie A.

A product of Universidad de Chile, Ramírez returned to them in 2025.

== International career ==
Ramírez represented Chile at under-20 level in the 2017 South American Championship and at under-23 level in the 2020 Pre-Olympic Tournament.

In addition, he took part of the Chile squad in the 2019 Toulon Tournament.

== Career statistics ==
=== Club ===
Club	Season	League		Continental		Cup		Total	
Club	Season	Apps	Goals	Apps	Goals	Apps	Goals	Apps	Goals
Universidad de Chile	2014–15	0	0	0	0	1	0	1	0
Universidad de Chile	2015–16	9	0	2	0	0	0	11	0
Universidad de Chile	2016–17	2	0	0	0	3	0	5	0
Universidad de Chile	Total	11	0	2	0	4	0	17	0
Career total		11	0	2	0	4	0	17	0
