= John-Paul Rochford =

Trinidadian footballer

Personal information
- Full name: John-Paul Giovanni Philippe Rochford
- Date of birth: 5 January 2000 (age 26)
- Place of birth: Arima, Trinidad and Tobago
- Height: 1.68 m (5 ft 6 in)
- Position: Midfielder

Team information
- Current team: AC POS
- Number: 15

Youth career
- 2018–2019: Portland Timbers

Senior career*
Years	Team	Apps	(Gls)
2019	Santa Rosa		
2019–2021	North East Stars		
2021	Antigua GFC	1	(0)
2022	Sure Sport FC		
2023–	AC POS		
2025–	Al-Khaburah Club		

International career^{‡}
- Trinidad and Tobago U17
2018	Trinidad and Tobago U20	7	(3)
2019–	Trinidad and Tobago	12	(2)
- * Club domestic league appearances and goals as of 28 December 2022 ‡ National team caps and goals as of 20:46, 14 January 2024 (UTC)

John-Paul Giovanni Philippe Rochford (born 5 January 2000) is a Trinidadian professional footballer currently playing as a midfielder for Al-Khaburah Club in Oman.

== Club career ==
Rochford signed a two-year deal with Guatemalan side Antigua GFC in February 2021.

In 2022, Rochford played for American club Sure Sport FC. In 2023, he moved home to Trinidad and Tobago and joined AC Port of Spain.

== Personal life ==
His brother, Jean-Luc, is a former footballer that represented Trinidad and Tobago at the 2007 FIFA U-17 World Cup and 2009 FIFA U-20 World Cup, scoring once in the latter tournament .

== Career statistics ==
=== Club ===
As of match played 28 December 2022

Appearances and goals by club, season and competition
Club	Season	League			Cup		Other		Total	
Club	Season	Division	Apps	Goals	Apps	Goals	Apps	Goals	Apps	Goals
Antigua GFC	2020–21	Liga Nacional de Guatemala	1	0	0	0	0	0	1	0
Career total			1	0	0	0	0	0	1	0

=== International ===
As of matches played 28 December 2022.

Appearances and goals by national team and year
National team	Year	Apps	Goals
Trinidad and Tobago	2019	1	0
Trinidad and Tobago	2020	— (Note: No games were played by Trinidad and Tobago in 2020.)	
Trinidad and Tobago	2021	0	0
Trinidad and Tobago	2022	9	2
Total		10	2

=== International goals ===
Scores and results list Trinidad and Tobago's goal tally first, score column indicates score after each Trinidad and Tobago goal.

List of international goals scored by Rochford
No.	Date	Venue	Opponent	Score	Result	Competition
1	25 March 2022	Hasely Crawford Stadium, Port of Spain, Trinidad and Tobago	Barbados	9–0	9–0	Friendly
2	13 June 2022	Hasely Crawford Stadium, Port of Spain, Trinidad and Tobago	Saint Vincent and the Grenadines	4–1	4–1	2022–23 CONCACAF Nations League B
