= Geremías Meléndez =

Venezuelan footballer (born 1995)

Personal information
- Full name: Geremías Meléndez Rhenals
- Date of birth: 5 May 1995 (age 31)
- Place of birth: La Concepción, Zulia, Venezuela
- Height: 1.87 m (6 ft 1 1/2 in)
- Position: Centre back

Team information
- Current team: Universidad Central

Senior career*
| Years | Team | Apps | (Gls) |
| 2016–2017 | Deportivo JBL | 19 | (0) |
| 2017–2018 | Venados | 5 | (0) |
| 2018–2019 | Deportivo JBL | | |
| 2019 | Dynamo Puerto | | |
| 2021 | Carabobo | 20 | (0) |
| 2022–2023 | Jaguares de Córdoba | 54 | (0) |
| 2024– | Universidad Central | 0 | (0) |
- * Club domestic league appearances and goals as of 18 August 2023

Geremías Meléndez Rhenals (born 5 May 1995) is a Venezuelan footballer who plays as a centre back for Universidad Central.
