= Eduardo Herrera (Venezuelan footballer) =

Venezuelan footballer (born 1993)

Personal information
- Full name: Eduardo José Herrera Alvarado
- Date of birth: 6 June 1993 (age 33)
- Place of birth: San Carlos, Venezuela
- Height: 1.90 m (6 ft 3 in)
- Position: Goalkeeper

Team information
- Current team: Academia Puerto Cabello

Senior career*
Years	Team	Apps	(Gls)
2011–2014	Carabobo	5	(0)
2012–2013	→ Atlético El Vigía (loan)	7	(0)
2014–2016	Deportivo Lara	55	(0)
2016–2021	Caracas	35	(0)
2019–2021	→ Academia Puerto Cabello (loan)	46	(0)
2021–2022	Hermanos Colmenarez	15	(0)
2022-2023	Titanes		
2024	Monagas	9	(0)
2025-	Academia Puerto Cabello	4	(0)
- * Club domestic league appearances and goals as of 22:13, 23 February 2023 (UTC)

Eduardo José Herrera Alvarado (born 6 June 1993) is a Venezuelan professional footballer who plays as a goalkeeper for Academia Puerto Cabello.
