= Jesús Hernández (footballer, born 1993) =

Venezuelan footballer

Personal information
- Full name: Jesús Isaac Hernández Córdova
- Date of birth: 6 January 1993 (age 33)
- Place of birth: Cumaná, Venezuela
- Height: 1.82 m (6 ft 0 in)
- Position: Forward

Team information
- Current team: Estudiantes de Merida

Senior career*
Years	Team	Apps	(Gls)
2004–2007	Deportivo Anzoátegui	50	(3)
2013–2014	→ Aragua (loan)	3	(0)
2014	Llaneros	15	(2)
2015	Monagas	1	(0)
2015–2018	Deportivo Lara	103	(33)
2017	→ Belenenses (loan)	5	(0)
2019	Audax Italiano	18	(4)
2020	Deportes Iquique	18	(1)
2021	Deportivo Lara	29	(7)
2022	Envigado	42	(14)
2023	Carabobo	22	(2)
2024	Deportivo Tachira	6	(1)
2024	Once Caldas	13	(1)
2024-2025	Estudiantes de Merida	24	(8)
2026	Envigado	21	(3)
2026-	Estudiantes de Merida	4	(2)
- * Club domestic league appearances and goals as of 15:58, 08 January 2021 (UTC).

Jesús Isaac Hernández Córdova (born 6 January 1993) is a Venezuelan footballer who currently plays for Estudiantes de Merida as a striker.

== Career ==
=== Youth, college and amateur ===
Hernández was born in Cumaná, Sucre, and began his career in the 2015 education tournament with ACD Lara until Torneo Clausura 2017, he accumulated 5365 minutes, in 73 games with 26 goals. He plays with Deportivo Anzoátegui, Llaneros de Guanare y Aragua FC.
