= Jefre Vargas =

Venezuelan footballer (born 1995)

Personal information
- Full name: Jefre José Vargas Belisario
- Date of birth: 12 January 1995 (age 31)
- Place of birth: Caracas, Venezuela
- Height: 1.80 m (5 ft 11 in)
- Position: Right back

Team information
- Current team: Academia Puerto Cabello

Youth career
- Caracas

Senior career*
| Years | Team | Apps | (Gls) |
| 2012–2017 | Caracas | 116 | (1) |
| 2017–2018 | → Arouca (loan) | 20 | (1) |
| 2018–2020 | Deportivo Lara | 72 | (1) |
| 2021 | Delfín | 8 | (0) |
| 2022-2023 | Metropolitanos | 72 | (1) |
| 2024-2025 | Deportivo Tachira | 20 | (0) |
| 2025- | Academia Puerto Cabello | 4 | (0) |

International career^{‡}
| 2015– | Venezuela | 3 | (0) |
- * Club domestic league appearances and goals as of 21 January 2021 ‡ National team caps and goals as of 20:45, 27 January 2022 (UTC)

Jefre José Vargas Belisario (born 12 January 1995) is a Venezuelan professional footballer who plays as a right back for Academia Puerto Cabello.

== Honours ==
He is a 2-time Venezuelan champion, who won in 2022 as part of Metropolitanos FC, and again in 2024, as part of Deportivo Táchira F.C.
