= Jhon Harold Balanta =

Colombian footballer (born 2004)

Personal information
- Full name: Jhon Harold Balanta Carabalí
- Date of birth: 16 March 1998 (age 28)
- Place of birth: Santander de Quilichao, Colombia
- Height: 1.80 m (5 ft 11 in)
- Positions: Defender; defensive midfielder

Team information
- Current team: Fortaleza
- Number: 18

Senior career*
Years	Team	Apps	(Gls)
2016–2017	Boca Juniors de Cali		
2017–2024	Deportes Quindío	91	(6)
2025–	Fortaleza	46	(2)

International career^{‡}
–2017	Colombia U20		
- * Club domestic league appearances and goals as of 13 March 2026 ‡ National team caps and goals as of 13 March 2026

Jhon Harold Balanta Carabalí (Note: In this Spanish name, the first or paternal surname is Balanta and the second or maternal family name is Carabalí.) (born 16 March 1998) is a Colombian footballer who plays for Fortaleza.

He contested the 2017 South American U-20 Championship for Colombia U20. He is a versatile player in that he can be used as a centre-back or midfielder. Following several years in Deportes Quindío, he moved to the first tier with Fortaleza in 2025.
