= Ignacio Anzola =

Venezuelan football player (born 1999)

Personal information
- Full name: Ignacio José Anzola Aguilar
- Date of birth: 28 July 1999 (age 27)
- Place of birth: Barquisimeto, Venezuela
- Height: 1.85 m (6 ft 1 in)
- Position: Centre back

Youth career
- ACD Lara

Senior career*
| Years | Team | Apps | (Gls) |
| 2017–2022 | ACD Lara | 66 | (2) |
| 2023 | Deportivo La Guaira | 4 | (0) |
| 2024 | Universidad Central | 1 | (0) |

International career^{‡}
| 2019–2020 | Venezuela U20 | 16 | (0) |
- * Club domestic league appearances and goals as of 04:28, 10 March 2021 (UTC) ‡ National team caps and goals as of 21:27, 3 February 2020 (UTC)

Ignacio Anzola (born 28 July 1999) is a Venezuelan football player as centre back.

== Career ==
=== Zamora ===
On 28 August 2019 it was confirmed, that Anzola had joined Spanish club Zamora CF. He left the club by the end of the year without playing a single game, after five months he returns to ACD Lara.
