= Juan Castellanos =

Venezuelan footballer (born 1975)

Personal information
- Date of birth: 7 January 1975 (age 51)
- Position: Midfielder

International career
Years	Team	Apps	(Gls)
1997	Venezuela	1	(0)

Juan Castellanos (born 7 January 1975) is a Venezuelan former footballer. He played in one match for the Venezuela national football team in 1997. He was also part of Venezuela's squad for the 1993 Copa América tournament.
