= Breiner Paz =

Colombian footballer (born 1997)

Personal information
- Full name: Breiner Alexander Paz Medina
- Date of birth: 27 September 1997 (age 29)
- Place of birth: Valledupar, Colombia
- Height: 1.82 m (6 ft 0 in)
- Position: Defender

Team information
- Current team: Zamora
- Number: 4

Youth career
- Millonarios

Senior career*
Years	Team	Apps	(Gls)
2016–2021	Millonarios	49	(0)
2022	Deportes Quindío	41	(0)
2023	Jaguares de Córdoba	14	(0)
2023	Independiente	2	(0)
2024	Independiente	16	(0)
2025–	Zamora	1	(0)

International career^{‡}
2017	Colombia U20	2	(0)
2018	Colombia U21	1	(0)
- * Club domestic league appearances and goals as of 9 March 2025 ‡ National team caps and goals as of 25 July 2018

Breiner Alexander Paz Medina (born 27 September 1997) is a Colombian footballer who plays for Venezuelan club Zamora.
