= Iván Rojas =

Colombian footballer (born 1997)

Personal information
- Full name: Iván Andrés Rojas Vásquez
- Date of birth: 24 July 1997 (age 29)
- Place of birth: El Espinal, Colombia
- Height: 1.77 m (5 ft 10 in)
- Position: Midfielder

Team information
- Current team: Once Caldas
- Number: 5

Senior career*
Years	Team	Apps	(Gls)
2016–2022	Envigado F.C.	197	(6)
2023	Independiente Santa Fe	34	(1)
2024–	Once Caldas	82	(1)
- * Club domestic league appearances and goals as of 12 December 2025

Iván Andrés Rojas Vásquez (24 July 1997) is a footballer from Colombia who plays as a midfielder for Once Caldas

== Career statistics ==
Club	Division	Season	League		Cup		Continental		Total	
Club	Division	Season	Apps	Goals	Apps	Goals	Apps	Goals	Apps	Goals
Envigado F.C.	Categoría Primera A	2016	24	2	6	0	-	-	30	2
Envigado F.C.	Categoría Primera A	2017	25	0	5	0	-	-	30	0
Envigado F.C.	Categoría Primera A	2018	32	1	2	0	-	-	34	1
Envigado F.C.	Categoría Primera A	2019	27	0	3	0	-	-	30	0
Envigado F.C.	Categoría Primera A	2020	10	0	0	0	-	-	10	0
Envigado F.C.	Categoría Primera A	2021	18	0	0	0	-	-	18	0
Envigado F.C.	Categoría Primera A	2022	43	1	0	0	-	-	43	1
Envigado F.C.	Total		179	4	16	0	-	-	195	4
Independiente Santa Fe	Categoría Primera A	2023	34	1	3	0	7	0	44	1
Once Caldas	Categoría Primera A	2024	24	1	2	1	-	-	26	2
Career total			237	6	21	1	7	0	265	7
