= Joel Graterol =

Venezuelan footballer (born 1997)

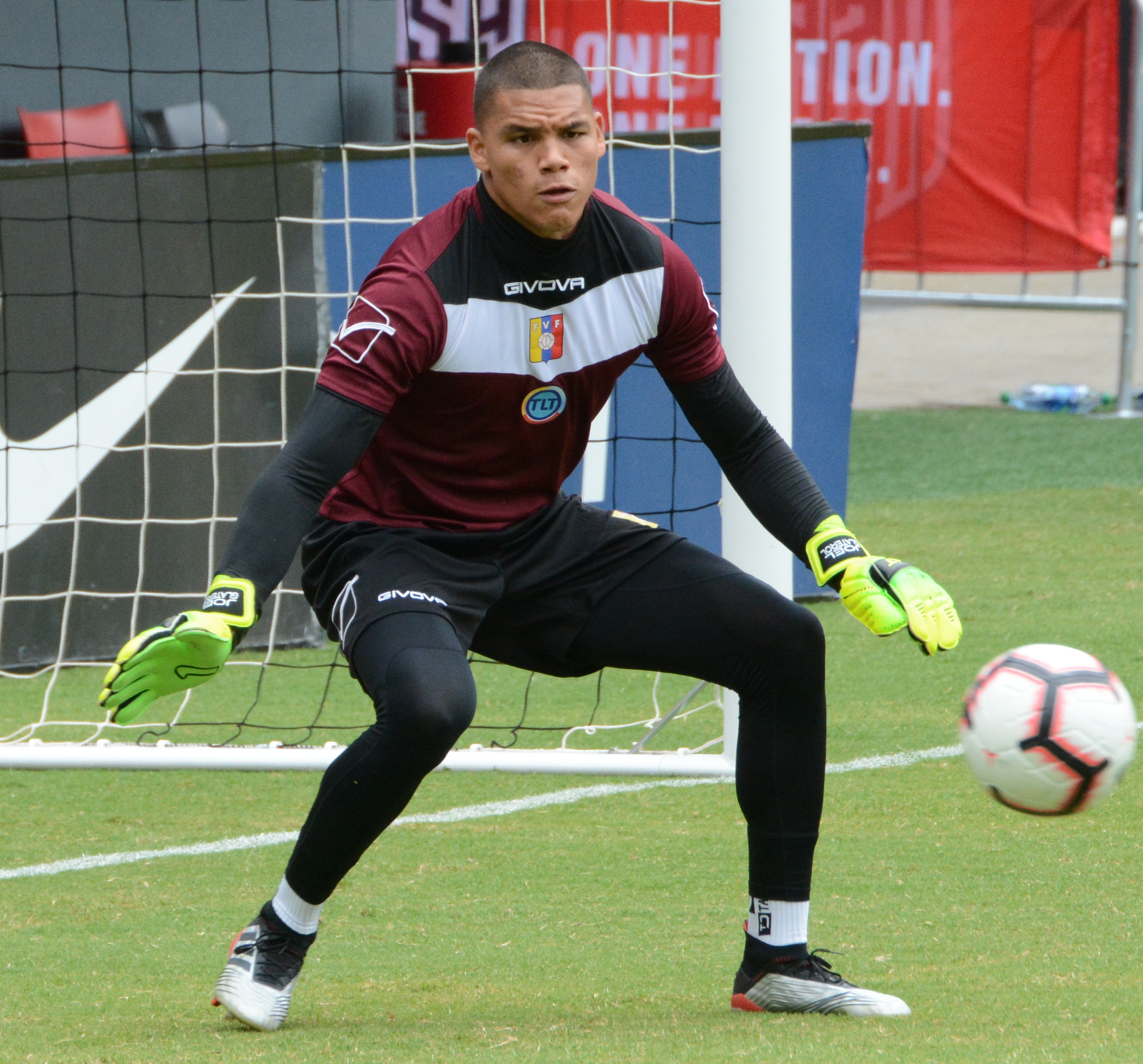
- Graterol with Venezuela in 2019

Personal information
- Full name: Joel David Graterol Nader
- Date of birth: 13 February 1997 (age 29)
- Place of birth: Valencia, Carabobo, Venezuela
- Height: 1.82 m (6 ft 0 in)
- Position: Goalkeeper

Team information
- Current team: Academia Puerto Cabello

Youth career
- –2015: Carabobo

Senior career*
Years	Team	Apps	(Gls)
2015–2017	Carabobo	2	(0)
2017–2019	Zamora	64	(0)
2020–2022	América de Cali	65	(0)
2023	Panetolikos	5	(0)
2024–2025	América de Cali	33	(0)
2026–	Academia Puerto Cabello	18	(0)

International career^{‡}
2017	Venezuela U20	1	(0)
2018	Venezuela U21	4	(0)
2021–	Venezuela	13	(0)
- * Club domestic league appearances and goals as of 15 September 2026 ‡ National team caps and goals as of 22:15, 9 June 2026 (UTC)

Joel David Graterol Nader (Spanish pronunciation: [ɟʝo'el]; born 13 February 1997) is a Venezuelan professional footballer who plays as a goalkeeper for Academia Puerto Cabello and the Venezuela national team.

== International career ==
Graterol was called up to the Venezuela under-20 side for the 2017 FIFA U-20 World Cup. He represented the senior Venezuela national team in a 3–1 2022 FIFA World Cup qualification loss to Bolivia on 3 June 2021.

== Career statistics ==
=== International ===
As of match played 9 June 2026

Appearances and goals by national team and year
National team	Year	Apps	Goals
Venezuela	2026	2	0
Total		2	0

== Honours ==
=== Club ===
Zamora

- Venezuelan Primera División: 2018
- Copa Venezuela: 2019

América de Cali

- Categoria Primera A: 2020

=== International ===
Venezuela U-20

- FIFA U-20 World Cup: Runner-up 2017
- South American Youth Football Championship: Third Place 2017
