= Academia Puerto Cabello =

Venezuelan association football team

Puerto Cabello
- Full name: Academia Puerto Cabello Club de Fútbol
- Nicknames: Los Guerreros del Fortín; La Academia; Los Porteños
- Founded: 13 June 2014; 12 years ago
- Ground: Complejo Deportivo Socialista
- Capacity: 7,000
- Chairman: Daniel Bonetti
- Manager: Eduardo Saragó
- League: Liga FUTVE
- 2025: Liga FUTVE, 5th of 14
- Website: www.academiapuertocabello.com
Home colours	Away colours	Third colours

Academia Puerto Cabello is a Venezuelan professional football club based in the city of Puerto Cabello, Carabobo state and playing in the Venezuelan Primera División. It plays its home matches at the Complejo Deportivo Socialista, also known as La Bombonerita.

== Players ==
=== Current squad ===
As of 5 July 2026

Note: Flags indicate national team as defined under FIFA eligibility rules; some limited exceptions apply. Players may hold more than one non-FIFA nationality.

No.	Pos.	Nation	Player
1	GK	VEN	Joel Graterol
4	DF	VEN	Sema Velázquez
5	MF	VEN	Gustavo González
6	MF	URU	Pablo Lima
7	FW	COL	Marlon Carabalí
8	MF	VEN	Júnior Moreno
9	FW	VEN	Andrés Ponce
11	FW	VEN	Edwuin Pernía
14	DF	URU	Gerónimo Bortagaray
15	DF	VEN	Daniel Saggiomo
16	DF	VEN	Roberto Rosales
17	FW	VEN	Jayson Martínez
19	FW	VEN	Jean Franco Castillo
20	MF	VEN	Jhon Marchán

No.	Pos.	Nation	Player
21	FW	VEN	Gerardo Padrón
22	GK	VEN	Eduardo Herrera
24	MF	VEN	Harrison Contreras
26	DF	PAN	Jiovany Ramos
27	DF	VEN	Heiber Linares
28	FW	VEN	Diego Osorio
29	DF	VEN	Jefre Vargas
30	DF	VEN	Luis Casiani
31	MF	VEN	José Hernández
44	DF	VEN	Geremías Meléndez
47	MF	SUI	Giovani Bamba (on loan from Vizela)
55	GK	VEN	Luis Romero
70	FW	VEN	Robinson Flores
77	MF	NGR	Musa Isah

== League rankings ==
Academia Puerto Cabello was promoted to the Venezuelan Primera División for the first time for the 2018 season.

- 2018: Apertura - 14th; Clausura - 12th; Overall - 14th
- 2019: Apertura - 11th; Clausura - 10th; Overall - 12th
- 2020: Group A - 3rd; Overall - 5th
- 2021: 11th
- 2022: 7th
- 2023: 4th

== CONMEBOL competitions history ==
- Copa Libertadores: 1 appearance

2024: Second Stage

- Copa Sudamericana: 2 appearances

2021: First Stage
2023: Group Stage
