= Venezuelan football league system =

Football league system

The Venezuelan football league system is a series of interconnected football leagues for clubs in Venezuela, and is organized by the Venezuelan Football Federation at the national level. The system has promotions and relegations between the different leagues in all different levels which means that even the smallest club can reach to the top level, the Primera División.

Level	Divisions
1st	Liga FUTVE; 14 clubs
	↓↑ 1 club
2nd	Liga FUTVE 2; 17 clubs
	↓↑ 1 club
3rd	Liga FUTVE 3; 39 clubs + 9 Reserve teams

Besides the current professional football league system the FVF also organize formation tournaments in which participates younger squads of professional clubs, amateur clubs and regional football associations. These tournaments are:

- Serie Nacional de Clubes Sub 20

- Serie Nacional de Clubes Sub 17

- Interregional Serie "A" Sub 20

- Interregional Serie "A" Sub 17

- Interregional Serie "B" Sub 20

- Interregional Serie "B" Sub 17

- Interregional de Clubes Sub 15

- Liga Nacional Femenina

- Nacional Femenino Sub 17

- Nacional Masculino Sub 16

- Nacional Masculino Sub 18

== Copa Venezuela ==
The Copa Venezuela (English: Venezuela Cup) is the national cup football competition of Venezuela. Organized by the Venezuelan Football Federation, is it disputed in the first half of the season by the teams in the Primera División, Segunda División and Segunda División B.

Over the years, the competition has had several names. Under its current format, the competition was revived by the FVF in 2007. The champion gets direct access to the Copa Sudamericana.
