= Antonio Romero (footballer, born 1997) =

Venezuelan footballer

Personal information
- Full name: Antonio Madreluis Romero Urquiola
- Date of birth: 16 January 1997 (age 29)
- Place of birth: Barinas, Venezuela
- Height: 1.69 m (5 ft 6 1/2 in)
- Position: Forward

Team information
- Current team: Monagas

Youth career
- 2010–2013: ACD Lara

Senior career*
Years	Team	Apps	(Gls)
2013–2018	ACD Lara	48	(7)
2017	→ Sigma Olomouc (loan)	1	(0)
2018	→ Zamora (loan)	26	(12)
2018–2022	Zamora	67	(23)
2019	→ Union SG (loan)	1	(0)
2021	Once Caldas	9	(0)
2021	Hermanos Colmenarez	9	(4)
2023	Unión Comercio	13	(2)
2023	Portuguesa	16	(3)
2024	Academia Puerto Cabello	13	(0)
2024	Zamora	13	(3)
2025	Estudiantes de Mérida	10	(4)
2025	Zamora	14	(4)
2026-	Monagas	4	(0)

International career
2013	Venezuela U17	9	(0)
2017	Venezuela U20	8	(0)
2018	Venezuela U21	5	(2)
- * Club domestic league appearances and goals as of 01:25, 30 November 2019 (UTC)

Antonio Madreluis Romero Urquiola (born 16 January 1997) is a Venezuelan footballer who plays as a forward for Monagas.

== International career ==
Romero was called up to the Venezuela under-20 side for the 2017 South American Youth Football Championship.

== Career statistics ==
=== Club ===
As of 22 August 2017

Club performance		League		Cup		Continental		Total	
Club	Season	Apps	Goals	Apps	Goals	Apps	Goals	Apps	Goals
Venezuela		Primera División		Copa Venezuela		Copa Libertadores		Total	
ACD Lara	2016	3	0	0	0	0	0	3	0
ACD Lara	2017	6	1	0	0	0	0	6	1
Total		9	1	0	0	0	0	9	1
Sigma Olomouc	2017–18	1	0	0	0	0	0	1	0
Total		1	0	0	0	0	0	1	0
Total
Total	Career total	10	1	0	0	0	0	10	1

== Honours ==
=== International ===
Venezuela

- South American Youth Football Championship: Third-Place 2017
