= Luis Ruiz (footballer, born 1997) =

Venezuelan footballer

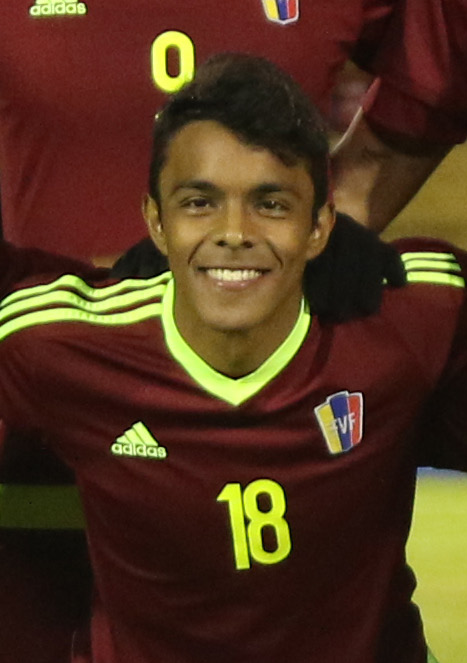

Personal information
- Full name: Luis Armando Ruiz Carmona
- Date of birth: 3 August 1997 (age 29)
- Place of birth: Caracas, Venezuela
- Height: 1.76 m (5 ft 9 1/2 in)
- Position: Midfielder

Team information
- Current team: Chrudim
- Number: 15

Youth career
- –2015: Deportivo La Guaira

Senior career*
Years	Team	Apps	(Gls)
2015–2016	Deportivo La Guaira	2	(0)
2016–2017	Zulia	17	(0)
2018–2019	Aragua	56	(0)
2020–2021	Gran Valencia	16	(0)
2021–2023	UCV	52	(0)
2023	Monagas	5	(0)
2023–2024	UCV	10	(0)
2024–	Chrudim	0	(0)

International career^{‡}
2017–	Venezuela U20	12	(0)
- * Club domestic league appearances and goals as of 20 June 2024 ‡ National team caps and goals as of 17:57, 4 June 2017 (UTC)

Luis Armando Ruiz Carmona (born 3 August 1997) is a Venezuelan footballer who plays as a defender for Czech National Football League side Chrudim.

== International career ==
Ruiz was called up to the Venezuela under-20 side for the 2017 FIFA U-20 World Cup.

== Career statistics ==
=== Club ===
As of 4 June 2017

Club performance			League		Cup		Continental		Total	
Club	Season	League	Apps	Goals	Apps	Goals	Apps	Goals	Apps	Goals
Deportivo La Guaira	2015	Primera División	2	0	1	0	0	0	3	0
Total			2	0	1	0	0	0	3	0
Zulia	2016	Primera División	16	0	4	0	0	0	20	0
Zulia	2017	Primera División	1	0	0	0	0	0	1	0
Total			17	0	4	0	0	0	21	0
Career total			19	0	5	0	0	0	24	0

== Honours ==
=== International ===
Venezuela U-20

- FIFA U-20 World Cup: Runner-up 2017
- South American Youth Football Championship: Third Place 2017
