= 2019 Liga FUTVE =

Liga FUTVE
- Season: 2019
- Dates: 26 January – 15 December 2019
- Champions: Caracas (12th title)
- Relegated: Estudiantes de Caracas; Deportivo Anzoátegui; Llaneros
- Copa Libertadores: Caracas; Estudiantes de Mérida; Deportivo Táchira; Carabobo
- Copa Sudamericana: Zamora (cup winners); Mineros; Llaneros; Aragua
- Matches: 388
- Goals: 991 (2.55 per match)
- Top goalscorer: Apertura: Edder Farías (18 goals); Clausura: Lucas Gómez (10 goals)
- Biggest home win: La Guaira 6–0 Trujillanos; 28 April 2019; Mineros 6–0 Portuguesa; 19 May 2019; Deportivo Táchira 6–0 LALA; 25 September 2019
- Biggest away win: Est. Caracas 0–6 Est. Mérida; 12 October 2019
- Highest scoring: La Guaira 5–2 Llaneros; 24 March 2019; Pto. Cabello 4–3 Est. Caracas; 31 March 2019; Metropolitanos 4–3 Trujillanos; 14 August 2019; Zamora 6–1 Est. Caracas; 9 September 2019; Est. Caracas 2–5 Zulia; 28 September 2019

The 2019 Primera División season, officially Liga de Fútbol Profesional Venezolano or Liga FUTVE, was the 38th professional season of Venezuela's top-flight football league. Zamora were the defending champions, but in the Torneo Apertura they were knocked out by Mineros in the quarter-finals and in the Torneo Clausura they failed to advance to the knockout stage. The champions were Caracas, who won the Torneo Clausura by defeating Deportivo Táchira in the final and then went on to beat Apertura winners Estudiantes de Mérida in the Serie Final on penalties to claim their twelfth league title.

== Teams ==
=== Stadia and locations ===
Locations of the 2019 Primera División teams

Relegated to 2019 Segunda División None (league expanded)	Promoted to 2019 Primera División: 1 / Llaneros; 2 / LALA

Team	Manager	City	Stadium	Capacity
Academia Puerto Cabello	(Venezuela) Carlos Maldonado	Puerto Cabello	La Bombonerita	7,500
Aragua	(Venezuela) Enrique García	Maracay	Olímpico Hermanos Ghersi Páez	14,000
Atlético Venezuela	(Venezuela) Henry Meléndez	Caracas	Brígido Iriarte^{a}	10,000
Carabobo	Vacant	Valencia	Misael Delgado^{b}	10,400
Caracas	(Venezuela) Noel Sanvicente	Caracas	Olímpico de la UCV	23,940
Deportivo Anzoátegui	(Venezuela) Juvencio Betancourt	Puerto La Cruz	José Antonio Anzoátegui	37,485
Deportivo La Guaira	(Venezuela) Daniel Farías	Caracas	Olímpico de la UCV	23,940
Deportivo Lara	(Venezuela) Leonardo González	Cabudare	Metropolitano de Cabudare	47,913
Deportivo Táchira	(Venezuela) Juan Tolisano	San Cristóbal	Polideportivo de Pueblo Nuevo	38,755
Estudiantes de Caracas	(Venezuela) Edson Rodríguez	Maracay	Olímpico Hermanos Ghersi Páez	14,000
Estudiantes de Mérida	(Argentina) Martín Brignani	Mérida	Metropolitano de Mérida; Guillermo Soto Rosa	42,200; 14,000
LALA	(Venezuela) Del Valle Rojas	Ciudad Guayana	Polideportivo Cachamay	41,600
Llaneros	(Venezuela) Edwin Quilagury	Guanare	Rafael Calles Pinto	13,000
Metropolitanos	(Venezuela) José María Morr	Caracas	Olímpico de la UCV	23,940
Mineros	(Venezuela) Richard Páez	Ciudad Guayana	Polideportivo Cachamay	41,600
Monagas	(Venezuela) May Montoya (caretaker)	Maturín	Monumental de Maturín	51,796
Portuguesa	(Venezuela) José Parada	Acarigua	General José Antonio Páez	18,000
Trujillanos	(Venezuela) Martín Carrillo	Valera	José Alberto Pérez	25,000
Zamora	(Uruguay) Rubén Benítez (caretaker)	Barinas	Agustín Tovar	29,800
Zulia	(Venezuela) Alexander Rondón	Maracaibo	José "Pachencho" Romero	40,800

a: Atlético Venezuela are playing outside the Brígido Iriarte Stadium in Caracas as the stadium was suspended. Atlético Venezuela played at the Estadio José Antonio Anzoátegui in Puerto La Cruz in the Torneo Apertura, while in the Torneo Clausura they are hosting their home matches at the Estadio Olímpico Hermanos Ghersi Páez in Maracay.
b: Carabobo are playing outside of the Estadio Misael Delgado in Valencia due to maintenance works at the stadium. Carabobo are playing their home matches at the Estadio Rafael Calles Pinto in Guanare.

==== Managerial changes ====
Team	Outgoing manager	Manner of departure	Date of vacancy	Position in table	Incoming manager	Date of appointment
Torneo Apertura
Metropolitanos	(Venezuela) Jhon Giraldo	Sacked		Pre-season	(Venezuela) José María Morr	18 December 2018
Atlético Venezuela	(Venezuela) Tony Franco	Sacked	2 November 2018	Pre-season	(Colombia) Jaime de la Pava	20 December 2018
Estudiantes de Caracas	(Venezuela) José María Morr	Mutual agreement	28 November 2018	Pre-season	(Venezuela) Daniel de Oliveira	12 December 2018
Portuguesa	(Venezuela) Raymond Páez	Sacked	9 December 2018	Pre-season	(Venezuela) Jobanny Rivero	9 December 2018
Deportivo Anzoátegui	(Venezuela) Jobanny Rivero	Signed by Portuguesa	9 December 2018	Pre-season	(Venezuela) Yoimer Segovia	9 January
Llaneros	(Venezuela) Edwin Quilagury	Mutual agreement	18 December 2018	Pre-season	(Venezuela) Julio Quintero	5 January
Llaneros	(Venezuela) Julio Quintero	Resigned	22 January	Pre-season	(Venezuela) Javier Yépez	22 January
Academia Puerto Cabello	(Venezuela) Pedro Depablos	Sacked	20 February	18th	(Venezuela) Carlos Maldonado	20 February
Deportivo Táchira	(Venezuela) Giovanny Pérez	Sacked	7 March	14th	(Venezuela) Juan Tolisano	7 March
Llaneros	(Venezuela) Javier Yépez	Resigned	19 March	17th	(Venezuela) Ramón Argüello (caretaker)	19 March
Trujillanos	(Venezuela) José Nabor Gavidia	Mutual agreement	22 March	20th	(Venezuela) Jesús Valiente	23 March
Deportivo Anzoátegui	(Venezuela) Yoimer Segovia	Sacked	27 March	20th	(Venezuela) Juvencio Betancourt	27 March
Portuguesa	(Venezuela) Jobanny Rivero	Sacked	9 April	16th	(Venezuela) José Parada	10 April
Monagas	(Venezuela) José Manuel Rey	Sacked	21 May	13th	(Argentina) Silvio Rudman	17 June
Llaneros	(Venezuela) Ramón Argüello	End of caretaker spell	18 May	18th	(Venezuela) Edwin Quilagury	11 July
Trujillanos	(Venezuela) Jesús Valiente	Replaced	16 June	19th	(Venezuela) Martín Carrillo	16 June
Torneo Clausura
Mineros	(Argentina) Horacio Matuszyczk	Resigned	16 August	7th	(Venezuela) Laydeker Navas (caretaker)	16 August
Zulia	(Venezuela) Francesco Stifano	Mutual agreement	14 September	12th	(Colombia) Alex García King (caretaker)	14 September
Estudiantes de Caracas	(Venezuela) Daniel de Oliveira	Mutual agreement	16 September	19th	(Venezuela) Edson Rodríguez	17 September
Zulia	(Colombia) Alex García King	End of caretaker spell	18 September	9th	(Venezuela) Alexander Rondón	18 September
Atlético Venezuela	(Colombia) Jaime de la Pava	Sacked	19 September	16th	(Venezuela) Henry Meléndez	20 September
Zamora	(Venezuela) Alí Cañas	Sacked	3 October	15th	(Uruguay) Rubén Benítez (caretaker)	3 October
Monagas	(Argentina) Silvio Rudman	Mutual agreement	13 October	16th	(Venezuela) May Montoya (caretaker)	14 October
Carabobo	(Venezuela) Jhonny Ferreira	Mutual agreement	11 December	13th		
Mineros	(Venezuela) Laydeker Navas	End of caretaker spell	14 December	9th	(Venezuela) Richard Páez	14 December

== Torneo Apertura ==
The Torneo Apertura is the first tournament of the season. The regular season started on 26 January and ended on 19 May.

=== Standings ===
Pos	Team	Pld	W	D	L	GF	GA	GD	Pts	Qualification
1	Carabobo	19	13	4	2	31	14	+17	43	Advance to the knockout stage
2	Caracas (Note: Zulia and Caracas were deducted one point by the Council of Honour of the FVF due to the events that occurred during the match played by both teams on March 10.)	19	10	6	3	34	15	+19	35	Advance to the knockout stage
3	Mineros de Guayana	19	10	4	5	35	23	+12	34	Advance to the knockout stage
4	Estudiantes de Mérida	19	7	9	3	24	12	+12	30	Advance to the knockout stage
5	Aragua (Note: Aragua were deducted three points for failing to pay an outstanding debt with former player Jarol Herrera.)	19	9	6	4	20	16	+4	30	Advance to the knockout stage
6	Zamora	19	8	5	6	27	24	+3	29	Advance to the knockout stage
7	Zulia	19	7	8	4	17	21	−4	28	Advance to the knockout stage
8	Atlético Venezuela	19	6	9	4	25	21	+4	27	Advance to the knockout stage
9	Deportivo Táchira	19	8	3	8	28	25	+3	27	
10	Deportivo La Guaira	19	7	5	7	36	25	+11	26	
11	Academia Puerto Cabello	19	6	8	5	32	28	+4	26	
12	Metropolitanos	19	7	5	7	21	18	+3	26	
13	Monagas	19	7	5	7	26	27	−1	26	
14	Deportivo Lara	19	6	6	7	23	21	+2	24	
15	LALA	19	5	7	7	22	33	−11	22	
16	Estudiantes de Caracas	19	5	4	10	25	36	−11	19	
17	Portuguesa	19	3	9	7	21	30	−9	18	
18	Llaneros (Note: Llaneros were deducted three points for failing to pay an outstanding debt with player Leonardo Ossa.)	19	3	5	11	27	46	−19	11	
19	Trujillanos	19	3	2	14	17	41	−24	11	
20	Deportivo Anzoátegui (Note: Deportivo Anzoátegui were deducted six points for failing to pay an outstanding debt with former player Edwin Aguilar.)	19	4	2	13	20	35	−15	8	

Source: Liga FUTVE, Soccerway
Rules for classification: 1) Points; 2) Goal difference; 3) Goals scored.

=== Results ===
Home \ Away	APC	ARA	AVE	CBO	CAR	ANZ	DLG	LAR	TAC	ESC	ESM	LAL	LLA	MET	MIN	MON	POR	TRU	ZAM	ZUL
Academia Puerto Cabello	—	—	—	—	1–0	1–3	3–3	2–0	2–2	4–3	—	—	—	1–1	—	4–0	2–0	1–1	—	—
Aragua	2–1	—	0–3	0–0	—	—	—	—	—	—	0–0	2–0	2–0	1–0	2–0	—	—	—	0–2	0–0
Atlético Venezuela	0–0	—	—	—	—	—	0–2	0–0	1–0	2–1	1–1	—	—	—	1–1	—	1–1	—	—	0–0
Carabobo	1–1	—	1–0	—	—	—	3–1	2–1	2–1	—	0–0	—	—	—	1–1	—	2–1	—	—	3–1
Caracas	—	1–1	2–2	0–2	—	—	—	—	—	—	1–0	2–2	5–0	1–0	4–2	—	—	1–0	3–0	—
Deportivo Anzoátegui	—	3–1	2–1	0–1	0–3	—	—	—	—	—	—	0–0	2–3	0–1	—	3–2	—	1–3	0–0	—
Deportivo La Guaira	—	0–0	—	—	1–4	1–0	—	—	—	3–0	—	—	5–2	—	—	2–3	2–0	6–0	4–0	—
Deportivo Lara	—	1–2	—	—	0–1	3–0	1–1	—	—	1–1	—	—	—	—	—	2–0	1–1	2–1	3–0	—
Deportivo Táchira	—	1–2	—	—	2–1	3–0	2–1	3–1	—	3–2	—	—	—	—	—	0–0	3–1	2–1	—	—
Estudiantes de Caracas	—	1–2	—	0–1	0–3	4–2	—	—	—	—	—	0–0	3–2	—	—	2–2	—	1–2	1–0	—
Estudiantes de Mérida	1–1	—	—	—	—	2–1	2–2	1–1	2–1	4–0	—	—	—	3–0	—	1–0	1–1	—	—	4–0
LALA	3–1	—	2–3	1–2	—	—	2–1	2–3	1–0	—	1–1	—	—	—	0–5	—	—	—	—	3–3
Llaneros	3–2	—	2–2	1–2	—	—	—	2–3	1–3	—	0–0	1–2	—	—	3–3	—	—	—	—	0–1
Metropolitanos	—	—	0–1	2–1	—	—	0–0	0–0	3–0	1–2	—	4–0	2–2	—	—	—	0–3	—	2–1	—
Mineros de Guayana	1–2	—	—	—	—	3–2	2–1	1–0	1–0	2–1	1–0	—	—	1–0	—	—	6–0	—	—	1–1
Monagas	—	0–1	2–1	2–4	1–1	—	—	—	—	—	—	3–0	3–0	1–1	2–1	—	—	2–1	2–0	—
Portuguesa	—	1–1	—	—	1–1	2–1	—	—	—	1–2	—	0–0	2–2	—	—	3–1	—	2–2	0–1	—
Trujillanos	—	2–1	1–3	0–3	—	—	—	—	—	—	0–1	1–2	1–3	0–2	0–3 (Note: Match awarded 3–0 to Mineros due to a lack of security personnel at the stadium, which caused the match to be cancelled.)	—	—	—	0–3	1–2
Zamora	2–2	—	3–3	1–0	—	—	—	—	2–2	—	1–0	1–1	3–0	—	3–0	—	—	—	—	4–1
Zulia	2–1	—	—	—	A (Note: The Zulia vs. Caracas match originally ended 0–0, however the Council of Honour of the FVF decided to annull this result following the events that occurred during the match. As a result, both teams had one point deducted and the match was officially registered as "played without assignment of points".)	1–0	1–0	1–0	1–0	1–1	—	—	—	0–2	—	0–0	1–1	—	—	—

Source: Liga FUTVE
Legend: Blue = home team win; Yellow = draw; Red = away team win.

=== Knockout stage ===
Quarter-finals
3	Mineros de Guayana (a)	1	1	2
6	Zamora	2	0	2
2	Caracas	2	1	3
7	Zulia	3	2	5
1	Carabobo	2	1	3
8	Atlético Venezuela	2	0	2
4	Estudiantes de Mérida	2	1	3
5	Aragua	1	1	2

Semi-finals
3	Mineros de Guayana (p)	0	0	0 (4)
7	Zulia	0	0	0 (3)
1	Carabobo	1	1	2
4	Estudiantes de Mérida (a)	0	2	2

Final
3	Mineros de Guayana	0	0	0 (0)
4	Estudiantes de Mérida (p)	0	0	0 (2)

==== Quarter-finals ====
Team 1	Agg.	Team 2	1st leg	2nd leg
Atlético Venezuela	2–3	Carabobo	2–2	0–1
Zulia	5–3	Caracas	3–2	2–1
Zamora	2–2 (a)	Mineros de Guayana	2–1	0–1
Aragua	2–3	Estudiantes de Mérida	1–2	1–1

===== First leg =====
24 May 2019	Zamora	2–1	Mineros de Guayana	Barinas
18:00	Romero 22'; Paiva 84'	Report	Camargo 87'	Stadium: Agustín Tovar; Attendance: 3,514; Referee: Juan Soto

25 May 2019	Zulia	3–2	Caracas	Maracaibo
16:00	Paz 57'; Moya 81'; Zambrano 86'	Report	Canelón 23', 38'	Stadium: José Pachencho Romero; Attendance: 2,215; Referee: Marlon Escalante

26 May 2019	Aragua	1–2	Estudiantes de Mérida	Maracay
16:00	Pérez 90+2'	Report	Mena 15'; Gómez 71'	Stadium: Hermanos Ghersi Páez; Attendance: 6,515; Referee: Ángel Arteaga

27 May 2019	Atlético Venezuela	2–2	Carabobo	Maracay
16:00	Farías 42'; Fernández 81'	Report	Ocanto 46'; González 75'	Stadium: Hermanos Ghersi Páez; Attendance: 996; Referee: José Argote

===== Second leg =====
31 May 2019	Carabobo	1–0 (3–2 agg.)	Atlético Venezuela	Cabudare
16:00	Febles 67'	Report		Stadium: Metropolitano; Attendance: 107; Referee: José Argote

1 June 2019	Mineros de Guayana (a)	1–0 (2–2 agg.)	Zamora	Ciudad Guayana
16:00	Blanco 81' (pen.)	Report		Stadium: Polideportivo Cachamay; Attendance: 813; Referee: Orlando Bracamonte

2 June 2019	Estudiantes de Mérida	1–1 (3–2 agg.)	Aragua	Mérida
17:00	Rodríguez 77'	Report	Plazas 26' (pen.)	Stadium: Metropolitano; Attendance: 16,172; Referee: Juan Soto

3 June 2019	Caracas	1–2 (3–5 agg.)	Zulia	Caracas
16:00	Arrieta 59'	Report	Moya 68', 74'	Stadium: Olímpico de la UCV; Attendance: 1,592; Referee: Ángel Arteaga

==== Semi-finals ====
Team 1	Agg.	Team 2	1st leg	2nd leg
Estudiantes de Mérida	2–2 (a)	Carabobo	0–1	2–1
Zulia	0–0 (3–4 p)	Mineros de Guayana	0–0	0–0

===== First leg =====
9 June 2019	Zulia	0–0	Mineros de Guayana	Maracaibo
16:30		Report		Stadium: José Pachencho Romero; Attendance: 10,373; Referee: Emikar Caldera

9 June 2019	Estudiantes de Mérida	0–1	Carabobo	Mérida
19:00		Report	Ocanto 67' (pen.)	Stadium: Metropolitano; Attendance: 17,806; Referee: Ramón Ortega

===== Second leg =====
16 June 2019	Carabobo	1–2 (2–2 agg.)	Estudiantes de Mérida (a)	Cabudare
17:00	González 82'	Report	Gómez 24'; Del Castillo 77'	Stadium: Metropolitano; Attendance: 646; Referee: Orlando Bracamonte

16 June 2019	Mineros de Guayana	0–0 (0–0 agg.) (4–3 p)	Zulia	Ciudad Guayana
19:30		Report		Stadium: Polideportivo Cachamay; Attendance: 1,112; Referee: Juan Soto
	Penalties
	Blanco (penalty scored); Rivero (penalty missed); Marrufo (penalty scored); Hernández (penalty scored); Gómez (penalty scored)		(penalty scored) Hernández; (penalty scored) Moya; (penalty scored) Martínez; (penalty missed) Paredes; (penalty missed) Casquete

==== Final ====
23 June 2019
17:00

Estudiantes de Mérida	0–0	Mineros de Guayana
	Report

Estadio Metropolitano, Mérida
Attendance: 37,870
Referee: Ángel Arteaga

30 June 2019
17:00

Mineros de Guayana	0–0	Estudiantes de Mérida
	Report
Penalties
Blanco (penalty missed); Marrufo (penalty missed); Camargo (penalty missed); Hernández (penalty missed)	0–2	(penalty missed) Gómez; (penalty scored) Flores; (penalty missed) Meza; (penalty scored) Manríquez

Polideportivo Cachamay, Ciudad Guayana
Attendance: 32,588
Referee: José Argote

Tied 0–0 on aggregate, Estudiantes de Mérida won on penalties.

=== Top goalscorers ===
Rank	Player	Club	Goals
1	(Venezuela) Edder Farías	Atlético Venezuela	18
2	(Venezuela) Richard Blanco	Mineros	11
2	(Venezuela) Aquiles Ocanto	Carabobo	11
4	(Venezuela) Armando Maita	LALA	10
5	(Venezuela) Luis Annese	Llaneros	9
5	(Colombia) Luis Carlos Cabezas	Deportivo La Guaira	9
5	(Honduras) Brayan Moya	Zulia	9
8	(Venezuela) Richard Celis	Caracas	8
9	(Venezuela) Armando Araque	Estudiantes de Caracas	7
9	(Venezuela) José Balza	Deportivo La Guaira	7
9	(Venezuela) José Rivas	Trujillanos	7

Source: Liga FUTVE

=== Attendances ===
#	Football club	Home games	Average attendance
1	Estudiantes de Mérida	10	4,027
2	Monagas SC	10	3,553
3	Academia Puerto Cabello	10	3,472
4	Deportivo Táchira	9	3,215
5	Aragua FC	10	2,631
6	LALA FC	9	2,453
7	Zamora FC	9	2,396
8	Mineros de Guayana	10	2,291
9	Deportivo La Guaira	9	1,743
10	Caracas FC	10	1,446
11	Deportivo Anzoátegui	10	1,430
12	Zulia FC	10	1,321
13	Deportivo Lara	8	1,136
14	Portuguesa FC	9	1,083
15	Metropolitanos FC	10	505
16	Trujillanos FC	10	475
17	Carabobo FC	9	305
18	Llaneros de Guanare	9	259
19	Estudiantes de Caracas	9	223
20	Atlético Venezuela	9	201

== Torneo Clausura ==
The Torneo Clausura is the second tournament of the season. The regular season started on 26 July and ended on 10 November.

=== Standings ===
Pos	Team	Pld	W	D	L	GF	GA	GD	Pts	Qualification
1	Deportivo Táchira	18	12	3	3	32	14	+18	39	Advance to the knockout stage
2	Caracas	18	8	6	4	22	15	+7	30	Advance to the knockout stage
3	Llaneros	18	9	3	6	27	26	+1	30	Advance to the knockout stage
4	Deportivo La Guaira	18	7	7	4	22	13	+9	28	Advance to the knockout stage
5	Trujillanos	18	8	4	6	28	25	+3	28	Advance to the knockout stage
6	Deportivo Lara	18	7	6	5	22	16	+6	27	Advance to the knockout stage
7	Aragua	18	7	6	5	19	14	+5	27	Advance to the knockout stage
8	Metropolitanos	18	7	6	5	23	20	+3	27	Advance to the knockout stage
9	Mineros de Guayana	18	6	7	5	20	18	+2	25	
10	Academia Puerto Cabello	18	5	8	5	29	27	+2	23	
11	Portuguesa	18	6	5	7	13	17	−4	23	
12	Zamora	18	5	7	6	24	18	+6	22	
13	Carabobo	18	6	4	8	27	27	0	22	
14	Zulia	18	6	4	8	27	32	−5	22	
15	Estudiantes de Mérida (Note: Estudiantes de Mérida were deducted three points for failing to pay an outstanding debt with former player Andrés Angulo.)	18	7	3	8	27	21	+6	21	
16	Estudiantes de Caracas	18	4	5	9	17	36	−19	17	
17	LALA	18	4	5	9	9	28	−19	17	
18	Monagas	18	2	9	7	21	30	−9	15	
19	Atlético Venezuela	18	3	6	9	12	24	−12	15	
20	Deportivo Anzoátegui	0	0	0	0	0	0	0	0	Withdrew from league (Note: Deportivo Anzoátegui withdrew from the league due to outstanding debts.)

Source: Liga FUTVE, Soccerway
Rules for classification: 1) Points; 2) Goal difference; 3) Goals scored.

=== Results ===
Home \ Away	APC	ARA	AVE	CBO	CAR	ANZ	DLG	LAR	TAC	ESC	ESM	LAL	LLA	MET	MIN	MON	POR	TRU	ZAM	ZUL
Academia Puerto Cabello	—	1–2	2–1	2–1	—	—	—	—	—	—	1–1	0–1	4–0	—	1–1	—	—	—	2–2	3–3
Aragua	—	—	—	—	1–0	—	0–0	2–2	1–2	3–0	—	—	—	—	—	1–1	1–0	0–1	—	—
Atlético Venezuela	—	1–1	—	2–1	0–2	—	—	—	—	—	—	1–1	1–4	0–0	—	2–1	—	1–2	0–2	—
Carabobo	—	2–1	—	—	0–2	—	—	—	—	1–3	—	0–0	3–1	1–1	—	5–1	—	2–3	2–2	—
Caracas	4–1	—	—	—	—	—	1–2	0–3 (Note: Match awarded 3–0 to Deportivo Lara due to crowd disturbances.)	0–0	2–2	—	—	—	—	—	1–0	3–1	—	—	1–2
Deportivo Anzoátegui	—	—	—	—	—	—	—	—	—	—	—	—	—	—	—	—	—	—	—	—
Deportivo La Guaira	2–2	—	1–1	2–0	—	—	—	3–1	0–1	—	2–0	4–0	—	0–1	1–1	—	—	—	—	0–0
Deportivo Lara	1–1	—	0–1	1–3	—	—	—	—	1–0	—	2–1	2–0	2–0	1–0	1–1	—	—	—	—	3–0
Deportivo Táchira	2–1	—	2–0	2–2	—	—	—	—	—	—	1–0	6–0	4–1	1–0	3–2	—	—	—	1–1	2–0
Estudiantes de Caracas	1–1	—	1–1	—	—	—	0–1	0–0	0–1	—	0–6	—	—	0–2	1–0	—	0–1	—	—	2–5
Estudiantes de Mérida	—	0–2	1–0	2–1	1–2	—	—	—	—	—	—	2–0	3–0	—	1–0	—	—	1–2	0–0	—
LALA	—	0–1	—	—	0–1	—	—	—	—	2–2	—	—	0–4	1–0	—	1–1	0–2	1–1	1–0	—
Llaneros	—	1–0	—	—	1–1	—	1–0	—	—	3–1	—	—	—	2–2	—	0–1	1–0	2–1	1–0	—
Metropolitanos	2–3	1–1	—	—	1–1	—	—	—	—	—	2–1	—	—	—	2–1	2–1	—	4–3	—	3–0
Mineros de Guayana	—	2–0	1–0	1–0	0–0	—	—	—	—	—	—	1–0	1–1	—	—	2–2	—	1–0	3–0	—
Monagas	1–1	—	—	—	—	—	2–2	1–1	2–1	0–1	2–2	—	—	—	—	—	0–2	—	—	2–2
Portuguesa	0–3 (Note: Match awarded 3–0 to Academia Puerto Cabello due to Portuguesa fielding the ineligible player Néstor Cova. The match originally ended 0–0.)	—	0–0	0–1	—	—	1–0	1–0	0–2	—	2–1	—	—	0–0	1–1	—	—	—	—	0–0
Trujillanos	2–0	—	—	—	0–0	—	1–1	1–0	3–1	1–2	—	—	—	—	—	3–2	1–1	—	—	—
Zamora	—	0–0	—	—	0–1	—	0–1	1–1	—	6–1	—	—	—	3–0	—	1–1	3–1	3–1	—	—
Zulia	—	0–2	2–0	1–2	—	—	—	—	—	—	2–4	0–1	2–4	—	4–1	—	—	3–2	1–0	—

Source: Liga FUTVE
Legend: Blue = home team win; Yellow = draw; Red = away team win.

=== Knockout stage ===
Quarter-finals
1	Deportivo Táchira	0	4	4
8	Metropolitanos	2	0	2
4	Deportivo La Guaira	1	2	3
5	Trujillanos	1	0	1
2	Caracas (a)	1	2	3
7	Aragua	3	0	3
3	Llaneros	0	1	1
6	Deportivo Lara	2	5	7

Semi-finals
1	Deportivo Táchira	0	3	3
4	Deportivo La Guaira	1	0	1
2	Caracas	1	2	3
6	Deportivo Lara	0	0	0

Final
1	Deportivo Táchira	1	2	3
2	Caracas (a)	1	2	3

==== Quarter-finals ====
Team 1	Agg.	Team 2	1st leg	2nd leg
Metropolitanos	2–4	Deportivo Táchira	2–0	0–4
Aragua	3–3 (a)	Caracas	3–1	0–2
Deportivo Lara	7–1	Llaneros	2–0	5–1
Trujillanos	1–3	Deportivo La Guaira	1–1	0–2

===== First leg =====
15 November 2019	Trujillanos	1–1	Deportivo La Guaira	Valera
16:00	Aponte 65'	Report	Silva 20'	Stadium: José Alberto Pérez; Attendance: 3,890; Referee: Jesús Valenzuela

16 November 2019	Metropolitanos	2–0	Deportivo Táchira	Caracas
16:00	Bustillo 6'; Acevedo 26'	Report		Stadium: Olímpico de la UCV; Attendance: 1,033; Referee: Ángel Arteaga

17 November 2019	Deportivo Lara	2–0	Llaneros	Cabudare
16:00	Castillo 29', 74'	Report		Stadium: Metropolitano; Attendance: 1,431; Referee: Yarcinia Correa

18 November 2019	Aragua	3–1	Caracas	Maracay
16:00	Navas 7', 50'; Plazas 37'	Report	Colmenarez 65'	Stadium: Hermanos Ghersi Páez; Attendance: 4,100; Referee: Emikar Caldera

===== Second leg =====
19 November 2019	Deportivo La Guaira	2–0 (3–1 agg.)	Trujillanos	Caracas
16:00	Marín 55'; Ortiz 65'	Report		Stadium: Olímpico de la UCV; Attendance: 1,739; Referee: José Argote

20 November 2019	Deportivo Táchira	4–0 (4–2 agg.)	Metropolitanos	San Cristóbal
16:00	Gómez 84', 90+2'; Reyes 89'; Pérez Greco 90+6'	Report		Stadium: Polideportivo de Pueblo Nuevo; Attendance: 4,161; Referee: Jesús Valenzuela

21 November 2019	Llaneros	1–5 (1–7 agg.)	Deportivo Lara	Barinas
16:00	Riascos 27' (pen.)	Report	Britos 18'; Castellanos 51'; Caraballo 56'; Castillo 72'; Arrieche 85'	Stadium: Agustín Tovar; Attendance: 1,054; Referee: Ángel Arteaga

22 November 2019	Caracas (a)	2–0 (3–3 agg.)	Aragua	Caracas
16:00	Quijada 29'; Añor 70'	Report		Stadium: Olímpico de la UCV; Attendance: 1,292; Referee: Alexis Herrera

==== Semi-finals ====
Team 1	Agg.	Team 2	1st leg	2nd leg
Deportivo La Guaira	1–3	Deportivo Táchira	1–0	0–3
Deportivo Lara	0–3	Caracas	0–1	0–2

===== First leg =====
24 November 2019	Deportivo La Guaira	1–0	Deportivo Táchira	Caracas
11:00	Flores 90+1'	Report		Stadium: Olímpico de la UCV; Attendance: 3,871; Referee: Alexis Herrera

25 November 2019	Deportivo Lara	0–1	Caracas	Cabudare
16:00		Report	Villanueva 7'	Stadium: Metropolitano; Attendance: 1,783; Referee: José Argote

===== Second leg =====
27 November 2019	Deportivo Táchira	3–0 (3–1 agg.)	Deportivo La Guaira	San Cristóbal
16:00	Ramírez 6'; Montero 48'; Pérez Greco 90+6'	Report		Stadium: Polideportivo de Pueblo Nuevo; Attendance: 6,621; Referee: José Argote

28 November 2019	Caracas	2–0 (3–0 agg.)	Deportivo Lara	Caracas
15:30	Celis 45'; Contreras 45+3'	Report		Stadium: Olímpico de la UCV; Attendance: 1,513; Referee: Ángel Arteaga

==== Final ====
1 December 2019
19:00

Caracas	1–1	Deportivo Táchira
Arrieta 11'	Report	Trejo 67'

Estadio Olímpico de la UCV, Caracas
Attendance: 10,488
Referee: José Argote

8 December 2019
19:00

Deportivo Táchira	2–2	Caracas
Camacho 6'; Cermeño 10' (pen.)	Report	Saggiomo 29' (pen.); Villanueva 90'

Estadio Polideportivo de Pueblo Nuevo, San Cristóbal
Attendance: 36,890
Referee: Ángel Arteaga

Tied 3–3 on aggregate, Caracas won on away goals.

=== Top goalscorers ===
Rank	Player	Club	Goals
1	(Argentina) Lucas Gómez	Deportivo Táchira	10
2	(Venezuela) Manuel Arteaga	Zamora	9
3	(Argentina) Gustavo Ascona	Academia Puerto Cabello	8
3	(Venezuela) Ronny Maza	Trujillanos	8
3	(Venezuela) Esli García	Deportivo Táchira	8
3	(Venezuela) Edanyilber Navas	Aragua	8
3	(Paraguay) Víctor Aquino	Deportivo La Guaira	8
3	(Colombia) Jesús Arrieta	Caracas	8
9	(Venezuela) Richard Blanco	Mineros	7
9	(Venezuela) Frank Feltscher	Zulia	7
9	(Venezuela) Luis Castillo	Estudiantes de Mérida	7
9	(Venezuela) Grenddy Perozo	Carabobo	7

Source: Liga FUTVE

== Serie Final ==
The Serie Final was held between the champions of the Torneo Apertura and the Torneo Clausura to decide the champions of the season. The team out of both finalists with the best placement in the aggregate table hosted the second leg.

=== First leg ===
11 December 2019
15:30

Estudiantes de Mérida	1–1	Caracas
Rivas 66'	Report	Espinoza 51'

Estadio Guillermo Soto Rosa, Mérida
Attendance: 13,800
Referee: Orlando Bracamonte

Estudiantes de Mérida	Caracas

GK	1	(Venezuela) Alejandro Araque
RB	20	(Venezuela) José Manríquez
CB	6	(Argentina) Oscar Sainz
CB	5	(Venezuela) William Díaz	(yellow card) 29'
LB	3	(Venezuela) Daniel Linarez
RM	7	(Venezuela) Jesús Meza (c)		(substituted off) 79'
CM	13	(Venezuela) Ayrton Páez		(substituted off) 56'
CM	15	(Venezuela) Cristian Rivas	(yellow card) 13' (yellow-red card) 49'
LM	17	(Venezuela) Christian Flores
CF	16	(Venezuela) Luis Castillo
CF	29	(Venezuela) Edson Rivas		(substituted off) 76'
Substitutes:
GK	12	(Venezuela) Aldair Peña
DF	2	(Venezuela) Omar Labrador
DF	23	(Venezuela) Galileo Del Castillo
DF	24	(Venezuela) Ronaldo Rivas		(substituted on) 56'
MF	8	(Venezuela) Yorwin Lobo
FW	9	(Mexico) Luz Rodríguez		(substituted on) 76'
FW	11	(Venezuela) Andris Herrera		(substituted on) 79'
Manager:
(Argentina) Martín Brignani

GK	1	(Venezuela) Alain Baroja
RB	30	(Venezuela) Luis Casiani	(yellow card) 77'	(substituted off) 79'
CB	3	(Venezuela) Rosmel Villanueva
CB	6	(Venezuela) Rubert Quijada (c)
LB	25	(Colombia) Juan Muriel
RM	10	(Venezuela) Daniel Saggiomo
CM	15	(Venezuela) Ricardo Andreutti		(substituted off) 72'
CM	18	(Venezuela) Anderson Contreras	(yellow card) 28' (yellow-red card) 58'
LM	21	(Venezuela) Leonardo Flores
CF	8	(Venezuela) Richard Celis
CF	9	(Venezuela) Carlos Espinoza		(substituted off) 82'
Substitutes:
GK	12	(Venezuela) Cristhian Flores
DF	4	(Venezuela) Arquímedes Hernández		(substituted on) 79'
MF	22	(Venezuela) Jorge Echeverría
MF	26	(Venezuela) Edgar Silva		(substituted on) 82'
MF	28	(Venezuela) Luis González
MF	33	(Venezuela) Diego Castillo		(substituted on) 72'
FW	32	(Venezuela) Enmanuel Moreno
Manager:
(Venezuela) Noel Sanvicente

Match rules

- 90 minutes.
- Seven named substitutes, of which up to three may be used.

=== Second leg ===
15 December 2019
19:00

Caracas	1–1	Estudiantes de Mérida
Arrieta 86'	Report	Meza 43'
Penalties
Celis (penalty scored); Saggiomo (penalty scored); Echeverría (penalty scored); Espinoza (penalty missed); Hernández (penalty scored)	4–3	(penalty scored) Flores; (penalty scored) Manríquez; (penalty missed) Linarez; (penalty scored) Díaz; (penalty missed) Araque

Estadio Olímpico de la UCV, Caracas
Referee: Alexis Herrera

Tied 2–2 on aggregate, Caracas won on penalties.

Caracas	Estudiantes de Mérida

GK	1	(Venezuela) Alain Baroja
RB	3	(Venezuela) Rosmel Villanueva
CB	25	(Colombia) Juan Muriel	(substituted off) 75'
CB	6	(Venezuela) Rubert Quijada (c)
LB	2	(Venezuela) Eduardo Fereira	(substituted off) 75'
RM	33	(Venezuela) Diego Castillo	(substituted off) 46'
CM	21	(Venezuela) Leonardo Flores
CM	10	(Venezuela) Daniel Saggiomo
LM	11	(Venezuela) Robert Hernández
CF	24	(Colombia) Jesús Arrieta
CF	8	(Venezuela) Richard Celis
Substitutes:
GK	12	(Venezuela) Cristhian Flores
DF	4	(Venezuela) Arquímedes Hernández
DF	30	(Venezuela) Luis Casiani	(substituted on) 75'
MF	15	(Venezuela) Ricardo Andreutti
MF	22	(Venezuela) Jorge Echeverría	(substituted on) 75'
MF	26	(Venezuela) Edgar Silva
FW	9	(Venezuela) Carlos Espinoza	(substituted on) 46'
Manager:
(Venezuela) Noel Sanvicente

GK	1	(Venezuela) Alejandro Araque
RB	20	(Venezuela) José Manríquez
CB	23	(Venezuela) Galileo Del Castillo
CB	6	(Argentina) Oscar Sainz
LB	3	(Venezuela) Daniel Linarez	(yellow card) 56'
RM	13	(Venezuela) Ayrton Páez		(substituted off) 61'
CM	7	(Venezuela) Jesús Meza (c)		(substituted off) 83'
CM	24	(Venezuela) Ronaldo Rivas
LM	17	(Venezuela) Christian Flores	(yellow card) 61'
CF	25	(Venezuela) Adrián Valero
CF	16	(Venezuela) Luis Castillo		(substituted off) 71'
Substitutes:
GK	12	(Venezuela) Aldair Peña
DF	4	(Venezuela) Jesús Álvarez
DF	5	(Venezuela) William Díaz		(substituted on) 71'
MF	8	(Venezuela) Yorwin Lobo		(substituted on) 83'
FW	9	(Mexico) Luz Rodríguez
FW	11	(Venezuela) Andris Herrera		(substituted on) 61'
FW	21	(Colombia) Wílson Mena
Manager:
(Argentina) Martín Brignani

Match rules

- 90 minutes.
- If the aggregate score is level, the away goals rule is used to determine the winner.
- Penalty shoot-out if the tie persists (no extra time is played).
- Seven named substitutes, of which up to three may be used.

== Aggregate table ==
Pos	Team	Pld	W	D	L	GF	GA	GD	Pts	Qualification or relegation
1	Deportivo Táchira	37	20	6	11	60	39	+21	66	Qualification for the Copa Libertadores second stage
2	Caracas (Note: Zulia and Caracas were deducted one point by the Council of Honour of the FVF due to the events that occurred during the match played by both teams on March 10.) (C)	37	18	12	7	56	30	+26	65	Qualification for the Copa Libertadores group stage
3	Carabobo	37	19	8	10	58	41	+17	65	Qualification for the Copa Libertadores first stage
4	Mineros de Guayana	37	16	11	10	55	41	+14	59	Qualification for the Copa Sudamericana first stage (Note: Mineros qualified for the Copa Sudamericana first stage as Torneo Apertura runners-up.)
5	Aragua (Note: Aragua were deducted three points for failing to pay an outstanding debt with former player Jarol Herrera.)	37	16	12	9	39	30	+9	57	Qualification for the Copa Sudamericana first stage
6	Deportivo La Guaira	37	14	12	11	58	38	+20	54	
7	Metropolitanos	37	14	11	12	44	38	+6	53	
8	Estudiantes de Mérida (Note: Estudiantes de Mérida were deducted three points for failing to pay an outstanding debt with former player Andrés Angulo.)	37	14	12	11	51	33	+18	51	Qualification for the Copa Libertadores group stage
9	Zamora	37	13	12	12	51	42	+9	51	Qualification for the Copa Sudamericana first stage (Note: Zamora qualified for the Copa Sudamericana first stage by winning the 2019 Copa Venezuela.)
10	Deportivo Lara	37	13	12	12	45	37	+8	51	
11	Zulia	37	13	12	12	44	53	−9	50	
12	Academia Puerto Cabello	37	11	16	10	61	55	+6	49	
13	Atlético Venezuela	37	9	15	13	37	45	−8	42	
14	Monagas	37	9	14	14	47	57	−10	41	
15	Portuguesa	37	9	14	14	34	47	−13	41	
16	Llaneros (Note: Llaneros were deducted three points for failing to pay an outstanding debt with player Leonardo Ossa.) (R)	37	12	8	17	54	72	−18	41	Qualification for the Copa Sudamericana first stage and relegation to Segunda División (Note: Llaneros qualified for the Copa Sudamericana first stage as the Torneo Clausura classification table best team not yet qualified. On 24 January 2020, they were administratively relegated due to a lawsuit by Leonardo Ossa.)
17	Trujillanos	37	11	6	20	45	66	−21	39	
18	LALA	37	9	12	16	31	61	−30	39	
19	Estudiantes de Caracas (R)	37	9	9	19	42	72	−30	36	Relegation to Segunda División
20	Deportivo Anzoátegui (Note: Deportivo Anzoátegui were deducted six points for failing to pay an outstanding debt with former player Edwin Aguilar.) (W, R)	19	4	2	13	20	35	−15	8	Withdrew from league (Note: Deportivo Anzoátegui withdrew from the league before the start of the Torneo Clausura due to outstanding debts.)

Source: Liga FUTVE
Rules for classification: 1) Points; 2) Goal difference; 3) Goals scored.
(C) Champions; (R) Relegated; (W) Withdrew from league
