= 2011–12 Venezuelan Primera División season =

Copa Movilnet
- Season: 2011–12
- Champions: Deportivo Lara (1st title)
- Relegated: Carabobo; Tucanes
- 2013 Copa Libertadores: Deportivo Lara; Caracas; Deportivo Anzoátegui
- 2012 Copa Sudamericana: Deportivo Lara; Monagas; Deportivo Táchira
- Top goalscorer: Rafael Castellín (20 goals)

The 2011–12 Primera División season was the 30th professional season of Venezuela's top-flight football league.

== Teams ==
Eighteen teams will participate this season, sixteen of whom remain from the previous season. Caroní and Atlético Venezuela were relegated after accumulating the fewest points in the 2010–11 season aggregate table. They will be replaced by Llaneros and Tucanes, the 2010–11 Segunda División winner and runner-up, respectively.

Locations of the 2011–12 Primera División teams

Team	City	Stadium
Aragua	Maracay	Olímpico Hermanos Ghersi Páez
El Vigía	El Vigía	Ramón "Gato" Hernández
Carabobo	Valencia	Misael Delgado
Caracas	Caracas	Olímpico de la UCV
Deportivo Anzoátegui	Puerto La Cruz	José Antonio Anzoátegui
Deportivo Lara	Barquisimeto	Metropolitano de Barquisimeto
Deportivo Petare	Caracas	Olímpico de la UCV
Deportivo Táchira	San Cristóbal	Polideportivo de Pueblo Nuevo
Estudiantes	Mérida	Metropolitano de Mérida
Mineros	Ciudad Guayana	Polideportivo Cachamay
Llaneros	Guanare	Rafael Calles Pinto
Monagas	Maturín	Monumental de Maturín
Real Esppor	Caracas	Brígido Iriarte
Trujillanos	Valera	Luis Loreto Lira
Tucanes	Puerto Ayacucho	Antonio José de Sucre
Yaracuyanos	San Felipe	Florentino Oropeza
Zamora	Barinas	Agustín Tovar
Zulia	Maracaibo	José "Pachencho" Romero

== Torneo Apertura ==
The Torneo Apertura is the first tournament of the season. It began in August 2011 and ended in December 2011.

=== Standings ===
Pos	Team	Pld	W	D	L	GF	GA	GD	Pts	Qualification
1	Deportivo Lara (C)	17	12	5	0	39	12	+27	41	Serie Final and the 2013 Copa Libertadores Second Stage
2	Caracas	17	11	3	3	27	13	+14	36	
3	Deportivo Petare	17	10	5	2	28	15	+13	35	
4	Deportivo Anzoátegui	17	9	3	5	16	11	+5	30	
5	Mineros	17	8	4	5	21	21	0	28	
6	Zulia	17	7	6	4	28	20	+8	27	
7	Yaracuyanos	17	6	6	5	24	17	+7	24	
8	Zamora	17	5	8	4	23	19	+4	23	
9	Aragua	17	5	8	4	15	19	−4	23	
10	Monagas	17	6	3	8	20	23	−3	21	
11	Trujillanos	17	5	5	7	22	21	+1	20	
12	Real Esppor	17	5	5	7	18	23	−5	20	
13	Deportivo Táchira	17	5	5	7	14	21	−7	20	
14	El Vigía	17	4	5	8	17	25	−8	17	
15	Tucanes	17	3	4	10	21	30	−9	13	
16	Llaneros	17	2	7	8	18	28	−10	13	
17	Estudiantes	17	1	8	8	15	37	−22	11	
18	Carabobo	17	1	6	10	17	27	−10	8 (Note: Carabobo deducted 1 point.)	

(C) Champions

=== Results ===
Home \ Away	ARA	ATV	CBO	CRC	DAN	DLA	DPE	DTA	EME	LLA	MGU	MON	RES	TRU	TUC	YAR	ZAM	ZUL
Aragua		3–2		0–0			0–0				1–0	0–2	1–1	2–0		0–3		1–4
El Vigía							3–2			2–1	1–2	2–0	1–0	0–2	1–1	1–1		1–1
Carabobo	1–1	1–1		1–2	0–1	2–3			2–2		2–2						0–0	
Caracas		2–1					1–4				4–0	2–1	2–0	1–0		2–0		2–1
Deportivo Anzoátegui	0–1	2–1		1–0			1–3				0–1	2–0	0–0	2–1				3–2
Deportivo Lara	1–1	3–0		0–0	0–0				3–1		5–1		4–0				4–0	1–0
Deportivo Petare			2–1			3–4		1–0	1–1	0–0		1–1		2–2	1–0	1–0		
Deportivo Táchira	2–0	0–0	2–1	2–1	0–2	1–1			3–0								0–0	
Estudiantes	1–1	1–0		0–2	0–0						1–1		0–5				1–1	2–2
Llaneros	0–0		1–0	1–2	0–1	1–2		3–0	1–1								2–2	
Mineros							0–1	2–0		2–1		3–1	1–0	2–0	1–1	1–1		0–2
Monagas			2–0			0–2		3–0	3–2	1–1					3–2	0–0	3–1	
Real Esppor			0–2				0–3	2–0		3–2		2–0		1–1	3–1	0–0		
Trujillanos			1–1			1–3		1–1	2–0	4–0		2–0			2–0	2–2		
Tucanes	0–1		1–0	1–4	0–1	1–1		1–2	5–1	1–1							1–3	
Yaracuyanos			3–2		1–0	0–2		2–0	5–1	4–0					2–3		0–0	
Zamora	2–2	3–0		0–0	1–0		1–2				1–2		4–0	3–1				1–1
Zulia			3–1				0–1	1–1		3–3		1–0	1–1	1–0	3–2	2–0		

Updated to match(es) played on December 18, 2011. Source: Soccerway
Legend: Blue = home team win; Yellow = draw; Red = away team win.

== Torneo Clausura ==
The Torneo Clausura is the second tournament of the season.

=== Standings ===
Pos	Team	Pld	W	D	L	GF	GA	GD	Pts	Qualification
1	Deportivo Lara (C)	17	13	3	1	32	12	+20	42	Serie Final and the 2013 Copa Libertadores Second Stage
2	Mineros	17	9	7	1	29	14	+15	34	
3	Deportivo Anzoátegui	17	9	5	3	21	10	+11	32	
4	Caracas	17	8	4	5	23	20	+3	28	
5	Llaneros	17	7	5	5	17	14	+3	26	
6	Zamora	17	7	4	6	23	23	0	25	
7	Zulia	17	8	1	8	13	13	0	25	
8	Trujillanos	17	5	8	4	17	16	+1	23	
9	Aragua	17	5	6	6	16	17	−1	21	
10	Carabobo	17	5	6	6	14	15	−1	21	
11	Deportivo Táchira	17	5	5	7	18	19	−1	20	
12	Monagas	17	5	5	7	14	15	−1	20	
13	Yaracuyanos	17	5	5	7	18	20	−2	20	
14	Estudiantes	17	4	7	6	17	19	−2	19	
15	Real Esppor	17	4	6	7	9	14	−5	18	
16	Deportivo Petare	17	3	7	7	16	22	−6	16	
17	El Vigía	17	4	4	9	11	24	−13	16	
18	Tucanes	17	2	2	13	15	36	−21	8	

Updated to match(es) played on 13 May 2012. Source: Standings
Rules for classification: 1) points; 2) goal difference; 3) number of goals scored.
(C) Champions

=== Results ===
Home \ Away	ARA	ATV	CBO	CRC	DAN	DLA	DPE	DTA	EME	LLA	MGU	MON	RES	TRU	TUC	YAR	ZAM	ZUL
Aragua			0–0		0–2	1–1		1–0	0–0	2–1					1–1		2–1	
El Vigía	2–1		1–0	2–3	1–0	0–2		0–0	1–1								1–2	
Carabobo							2–0	1–0		0–0		2–1	2–0	1–1	1–0	1–1		0–1
Caracas	2–1		2–1		0–0	2–3		1–1	2–1	1–0					3–0		1–0	
Deportivo Anzoátegui			0–0			1–0		2–1	3–1	1–0					6–1	2–1	1–0	
Deportivo Lara			2–0				2–1	3–1		1–0		2–1		1–1	6–1	1–0		
Deportivo Petare	1–0	0–0		1–0	0–1						2–4	0–1	0–0				2–2	1–2
Deportivo Táchira							3–3			3–1	1–2	1–0	0–1	2–0	1–0	1–1		1–0
Estudiantes			2–2			1–2	1–1	2–1		1–2		0–0		1–0	2–0	1–0		
Llaneros		2–0					1–0				1–1	1–1	2–0	1–1	2–1	2–1		1–0
Mineros	2–2	4–0	2–0	1–1	2–0	0–1			1–1								3–1	
Monagas	0–0	2–1		2–0	1–1		2–0				0–1		1–0	1–1				1–0
Real Esppor	1–1	0–0		0–1	1–1	0–0			0–0		0–1						1–2	1–0
Trujillanos	2–1	3–0		2–1	0–0		0–0				1–1		0–2				1–3	1–0
Tucanes		1–2					2–2				1–2	3–1	2–0	1–3		0–1		0–1
Yaracuyanos	1–0	2–0		3–3			0–2				2–2	1–0	1–2	0–0				1–2
Zamora			2–1			1–3		1–1	3–2	0–0		1–0			2–2	1–2		
Zulia	1–3	1–0		2–0	1–0	1–2			1–0		1–0						0–1	

Updated to match(es) played on May 13, 2012. Source: Soccerway
Legend: Blue = home team win; Yellow = draw; Red = away team win.

== Aggregate table ==
Pos	Team	Pld	W	D	L	GF	GA	GD	Pts	Qualification or relegation
1	Deportivo Lara	34	25	8	1	71	24	+47	83	2013 Copa Libertadores Second Stage and 2012 Copa Sudamericana First Stage (Note: Deportivo Lara qualified for the 2013 Copa Libertadores as the overall champion, and for the 2012 Copa Sudamericana as the best team in the aggregate table.)
2	Caracas	34	19	7	8	50	33	+17	64	2013 Copa Libertadores Second Stage (Note: Since Deportivo Lara won both the Apertura and Clausura, the next two teams in the aggregate table qualified for the 2013 Copa Libertadores.)
3	Deportivo Anzoátegui	34	18	8	8	37	21	+16	62	2013 Copa Libertadores First Stage
4	Mineros	34	17	10	7	50	37	+13	61	2012 Copa Sudamericana First Stage (Note: Mineros de Guayana qualified for 2012 Copa Sudamericana as the winners of the 2011 Copa Venezuela.)
5	Zulia	34	16	6	12	42	33	+9	54	Qualified to the Serie Sudamericana
6	Deportivo Petare	34	13	12	9	44	37	+7	51	Qualified to the Serie Sudamericana
7	Zamora	34	12	12	10	46	41	+5	48	Qualified to the Serie Sudamericana
8	Yaracuyanos	34	11	11	12	42	37	+5	44	Qualified to the Serie Sudamericana
9	Aragua	34	10	14	10	31	36	−5	44	Qualified to the Serie Sudamericana
10	Trujillanos	34	10	13	11	39	37	+2	43	Qualified to the Serie Sudamericana
11	Monagas	34	11	8	15	34	37	−3	41	Qualified to the Serie Sudamericana
12	Deportivo Táchira	34	10	10	14	32	40	−8	40	Qualified to the Serie Sudamericana
13	Llaneros	34	9	12	13	35	42	−7	39	
14	Real Esppor	34	9	11	14	27	37	−10	38	
15	El Vigía	34	8	9	17	28	49	−21	33	
16	Estudiantes	34	5	15	14	32	56	−24	30	
17	Carabobo	34	6	12	16	31	42	−11	29 (Note: Carabobo deducted 1 point.)	Relegated to the Segunda División
18	Tucanes	34	5	6	23	36	66	−30	21	Relegated to the Segunda División

Rules for classification: 1) points; 2) goal difference; 3) number of goals scored.

== Season top goalscorers ==
Rank	Player	Nationality	Club	Goals
1	Rafael Castellín	Venezuelan	Deportivo Lara	20
2	Richard Blanco	Venezuelan	Deportivo Petare	14
3	Heiber Díaz	Venezuelan	Carabobo	13
4	Víctor Renteria	Colombian	Tucanes	12
5	Alexander Rondón	Venezuelan	Aragua	11
5	Fernando Aristeguieta	Venezuelan	Caracas	11
7	Edgar Pérez Greco	Venezuelan	Deportivo Lara	10
7	Jorge Rojas	Venezuelan	Mineros	10
7	Julio Gutiérrez	Chilean	Mineros	10
7	Edder Farías	Venezuelan	Monagas	10

== Serie Final ==
Because Deportivo Lara won both the Apertura and Clausura, the Serie Final was not played, and Deportivo Lara was declared champion automatically.

== Serie Sudamericana ==
Other than the teams which already qualify for the Copa Libertadores (Apertura and Clausura champions and the best-placed team in the aggregate table) and the Copa Sudamericana (Copa Venezuela champion), the eight best-placed teams in the aggregate table will contest in the Serie Sudamericana for the remaining two berths to the Copa Sudamericana, which qualify the two winners to the First Stage.

In the first round, the matchups are:

- Match A (1 vs. 8)
- Match B (2 vs. 7)
- Match C (3 vs. 6)
- Match D (4 vs. 5)

In the second round, the matchups are:

- Winner A vs. Winner C
- Winner B vs. Winner D

For the two second round winners, the team with the better record in the aggregate table will receive the Venezuela 3 berth, while the other team will receive the Venezuela 4 berth.

=== First round ===
==== Match A ====
Pos	Team	Pld	W	D	L	GF	GA	GD	Pts	Qualification
1	Deportivo Táchira	2	1	0	1	5	3	+2	3	Second Round
2	Zulia	2	1	0	1	3	5	−2	3	

Rules for classification: 1st points; 2nd goals scored; 3rd away goals; 4th penalty shoot-out.
May 20, 2012
16:00 UTC−04:30

Deportivo Táchira	5–0	Zulia
Ángel 36'; Chourio 54'; Parra 75'; Cova 90'; Herrera 90+3'	Report

Polideportivo de Pueblo Nuevo, San Cristóbal
Attendance: 6.721
Referee: Juan Soto (Dtto Capital)

May 23, 2012
16:00 UTC−04:30

Zulia	3–0	Deportivo Táchira
Rojas 4'; Bolívar 64' (pen.); Cassiani 88'	Report

José "Pachencho" Romero, Maracaibo
Attendance: 2.000
Referee: Héctor Rojas (Monagas)

==== Match B ====
Pos	Team	Pld	W	D	L	GF	GA	GD	Pts	Qualification
1	Yaracuyanos	2	1	1	0	4	3	+1	4	Second Round
2	Aragua	2	0	1	1	3	4	−1	1	

Rules for classification: 1st points; 2nd goals scored; 3rd away goals; 4th penalty shoot-out.
May 20, 2012
15:30 UTC−04:30

Aragua	2–3	Yaracuyanos
Rondón 24', 54'	Report	Moreno 35'; Osorio 68', 82'

Giuseppe Antonelli, Maracay
Attendance: 2.018
Referee: José Argote (Zulia)

May 23, 2012
19:30 UTC−04:30

Yaracuyanos	1–1	Aragua
Aguilar 61'	Report	Febles 56'

Florentino Oropeza, San Felipe
Attendance: 5.281
Referee: José Marquina (Mérida)

==== Match C ====
Pos	Team	Pld	W	D	L	GF	GA	GD	Pts	Qualification
1	Monagas	2	1	1	0	2	1	+1	4	Second Round
2	Deportivo Petare	2	0	1	1	1	2	−1	1	

Rules for classification: 1st points; 2nd goals scored; 3rd away goals; 4th penalty shoot-out.
May 20, 2012
16:00 UTC−04:30

Monagas	1–1	Deportivo Petare
Farías 72'	Report	Márquez 90+3'

Monumental de Maturín, Maturín
Attendance: 3.024
Referee: Marlon Escalante (Táchira)

May 23, 2012
19:00 UTC−04:30

Deportivo Petare	0–1	Monagas
	Report	Farías 64'

Olímpico de la UCV, Caracas
Attendance: 610
Referee: Rafael López (Cojedes)

==== Match D ====
Pos	Team	Pld	W	D	L	GF	GA	GD	Pts	Qualification
1	Zamora	2	1	0	1	3	2	+1	3	Second Round
2	Trujillanos	2	1	0	1	2	3	−1	3	

Rules for classification: 1st points; 2nd goals scored; 3rd away goals; 4th penalty shoot-out.
May 20, 2012
16:00 UTC−04:30

Trujillanos	2–1	Zamora
España 14'; Alzáte 32'	Report	Yánez 16'

José Alberto Pérez, Valera
Attendance: 4.024
Referee: Jesús Valenzuela (Portuguesa)

May 23, 2012
19:30 UTC−04:30

Zamora	2–0	Trujillanos
J. Torres 39'; Ramírez 90+3'	Report

Agustín Tovar, Barinas
Attendance: 3.405
Referee: Edson Suárez (Lara)

=== Second round ===
==== Winner A vs. Winner C ====
Pos	Team	Pld	W	D	L	GF	GA	GD	Pts	Qualification
1	Deportivo Táchira	2	0	2	0	1	1	0	2	2012 Copa Sudamericana First Stage
2	Yaracuyanos	2	0	2	0	1	1	0	2	

Rules for classification: 1st points; 2nd goals scored; 3rd away goals; 4th penalty shoot-out.
May 27, 2012
16:00 UTC−04:30

Deportivo Táchira	0–0	Yaracuyanos
	Report

Polideportivo de Pueblo Nuevo, San Cristóbal
Attendance: 8.950
Referee: Adrian Cabello (Bolívar)

May 30, 2012
19:30 UTC−04:30

Yaracuyanos	1–1	Deportivo Táchira
Osorio 55'	Report	Ángel 40'

Florentino Oropeza, San Felipe
Attendance: 10.724
Referee: Rafael López (Cojedes)

==== Winner B vs. Winner D ====
Pos	Team	Pld	W	D	L	GF	GA	GD	Pts	Qualification
1	Monagas	2	1	0	1	2	2	0	3	2012 Copa Sudamericana First Stage
2	Zamora	2	1	0	1	2	2	0	3	

Rules for classification: 1st points; 2nd goals scored; 3rd away goals; 4th penalty shoot-out.
May 27, 2012
16:00 UTC−04:30

Monagas	2–0	Zamora
Ulloque 3'; Cabezas 88'	Report

Monumental de Maturín, Maturín
Attendance: 5.535
Referee: Yimmi García (Táchira)

May 30, 2012
19:30 UTC−04:30

Zamora	2–0	Monagas
Yánez 55'; G. Torres 71'	Report
Penalties
Yánez (penalty scored); G. Torres (penalty scored); J. Torres (penalty missed); Ramírez (penalty scored); Noriega (penalty scored)	4–5	(penalty scored) Herrera; (penalty scored) Farías; (penalty scored) Briceño; (penalty scored) Sánchez; (penalty scored) Boada

Agustín Tovar, Barinas
Attendance: 3.413
Referee: Luis Márquez (Portuguesa)
