= 2009–10 Venezuelan Primera División season =

Copa Movilnet
- Season: 2009–10
- Champions: Caracas (11th title)
- Relegated: Centro Ítalo; Llaneros
- Copa Libertadores: Deportivo Táchira; Caracas; Deportivo Italia
- Copa Sudamericana: Deportivo Lara
- Matches played: 306
- Goals scored: 817 (2.67 per match)
- Biggest home win: Estudiantes 6–0 Zamora (September 27, 2009)
- Biggest away win: El Vigía 1–6 Caracas (September 20, 2009)
- Highest scoring: Trujillanos 7–2 Carabobo (September 13, 2009)

The 2009–10 Primera División season (officially the 2009–10 Copa Movilnet for sponsorship reasons) is the 28th professional season of Venezuela's top-flight football league.

== Teams ==
Locations of the 2009-10 Primera División teams

Team	City	Stadium
Aragua	Maracay	Olímpico Hermanos Ghersi Páez
Carabobo	Valencia	Misael Delgado
Caracas	Caracas	Olímpico de la UCV
Centro Ítalo	Caracas	Brígido Iriarte
Deportivo Anzoátegui	Puerto La Cruz	José Antonio Anzoátegui
Deportivo Italia	Caracas	Olímpico de la UCV
Deportivo Lara	Barquisimeto	Metropolitano de Barquisimeto
Deportivo Táchira	San Cristóbal	Polideportivo de Pueblo Nuevo
El Vigía	El Vigía	Ramón "Gato" Hernández
Estudiantes	Mérida	Metropolitano de Mérida
Llaneros	Guanare	Rafael Calles Pinto
Mineros de Guayana	Puerto Ordaz	Polideportivo Cachamay
Monagas	Maturín	Monumental de Maturín
Real Esppor	Caracas	Brígido Iriarte
Trujillanos	Valera	Luis Loreto Lira
Yaracuyanos	San Felipe	Florentino Oropeza
Zamora	Barinas	Agustín Tovar
Zulia	Maracaibo	José "Pachencho" Romero

== Torneo Apertura ==
The Torneo Apertura opened the 2009-10 season. It began on August 9, 2009 and finished on December 13, 2009.

=== Standings ===
Pos	Team	Pld	W	D	L	GF	GA	GD	Pts	Qualification
1	Deportivo Táchira	17	11	4	2	25	7	+18	37	Serie Final and the 2011 Copa Libertadores Second Stage
2	Deportivo Italia	17	11	3	3	26	14	+12	36	
3	Caracas	17	11	2	4	35	14	+21	35	
4	Deportivo Lara	17	8	6	3	23	13	+10	30	
5	Trujillanos	17	8	4	5	31	21	+10	28	
6	Deportivo Anzoátegui	17	8	2	7	22	19	+3	26	
7	Mineros de Guayana	17	7	4	6	22	21	+1	25	
8	Zulia	17	7	3	7	27	29	−2	24	
9	Estudiantes de Mérida	17	5	8	4	21	15	+6	23	
10	Atlético El Vigía	17	7	2	8	26	31	−5	23	
11	Zamora	17	6	4	7	19	27	−8	22	
12	Monagas	17	6	3	8	32	32	0	21	
13	Yaracuyanos	17	6	3	8	20	29	−9	21	
14	Aragua	17	4	7	6	11	18	−7	19	
15	Real Esppor	17	4	5	8	12	21	−9	17	
16	Centro Ítalo	17	3	5	9	19	26	−7	14	
17	Carabobo	17	2	7	8	16	29	−13	13	
18	Llaneros	17	1	4	12	18	39	−21	7	

Updated to match(es) played on December 13, 2009. Source: RSSSF
Rules for classification: 1) points; 2) goal difference; 3) number of goals scored.

=== Results ===
Home \ Away	ARA	ATV	CBO	CRC	CIV	DAN	DIT	DLA	DTA	EME	LLA	MGU	MON	RES	TRU	YAR	ZAM	ZUL
Aragua		2–1			1–0	0–2			0–0	1–1		1–0		1–0	0–1		0–0	
El Vigía			4–2	1–6		2–0	1–3	0–2			3–1		2–2			2–2		3–1
Carabobo	1–1				2–2		0–1	2–2	0–0	0–0			3–2					2–1
Caracas	4–0		2–1				0–1	2–0			1–1		3–1			2–0		4–0
Centro Ítalo		2–3		1–3		1–0				0–0		2–2		1–1	2–1	2–3	2–0	
Deportivo Anzoátegui			1–0	2–0			0–1	1–0			4–1		2–1			2–2		4–3
Deportivo Italia	1–1				3–1			0–1	0–3	0–0		1–1		2–0	2–1			2–0
Deportivo Lara	1–1				2–1				2–0	1–1		2–0		1–0	2–2		1–1	2–1
Deportivo Táchira		2–1		1–0	1–0	2–0				3–0		4–1		0–0	0–0		2–0	
Estudiantes		2–0		1–2		0–0						3–1		0–0	3–2	1–2	6–0	
Llaneros	2–0		1–1		0–0		0–3	0–4	0–2	1–1			0–2					3–4
Mineros de Guayana		1–0	2–0	0–1		1–0					3–2		6–2			1–0	2–1	
Monagas	2–2				2–1		5–3	1–0	0–1	0–1				5–0	1–0			2–2
Real Esppor		0–1	0–0	0–3		3–2					2–1	1–1				3–0	0–1	
Trujillanos		3–1	7–2	1–1		2–1					2–1	1–0		2–1		5–1	0–0	
Yaracuyanos	1–0		2–0				0–1	0–0	0–2		3–1		2–1					0–3
Zamora		0–1	1–0	3–1		0–1	0–2				4–3		4–3			3–2		
Zulia	1–0				2–1				3–2	2–1		0–0		0–1	3–1		1–1	

Updated to match(es) played on December 13, 2009. Source: RSSSF
Legend: Blue = home team win; Yellow = draw; Red = away team win.

== Torneo Clausura ==
The Torneo Clausura closed the 2009-10 season. It began on January 17, 2010 and finished on May 16, 2010.

=== Standings ===
Pos	Team	Pld	W	D	L	GF	GA	GD	Pts	Qualification
1	Caracas	17	10	5	2	31	16	+15	35	Serie Final and the 2011 Copa Libertadores Second Stage
2	Deportivo Táchira	17	10	5	2	28	15	+13	35	
3	Deportivo Italia	17	10	3	4	36	16	+20	33	
4	Deportivo Lara	17	7	8	2	26	17	+9	29	
5	Zulia	17	9	2	6	26	21	+5	29	
6	Trujillanos	17	8	4	5	21	16	+5	28	
7	Zamora	17	8	4	5	26	22	+4	28	
8	Atlético El Vigía	17	7	3	7	26	29	−3	24	
9	Deportivo Anzoátegui	17	6	5	6	17	10	+7	23	
10	Aragua	17	7	1	9	22	27	−5	22	
11	Real Esppor	17	6	3	8	27	27	0	21	
12	Monagas	17	5	4	8	19	30	−11	19	
13	Carabobo	17	4	6	7	16	23	−7	18	
14	Estudiantes de Mérida	17	3	8	6	17	23	−6	17	
15	Mineros de Guayana	17	3	8	6	17	24	−7	17	
16	Llaneros	17	4	3	10	20	28	−8	15	
17	Yaracuyanos	17	3	5	9	20	27	−7	14	
18	Centro Ítalo	17	3	3	11	17	29	−12	12	

Updated to match(es) played on May 16, 2010. Source: FVF
Rules for classification: 1) points; 2) goal difference; 3) number of goals scored.

=== Results ===
Home \ Away	ARA	ATV	CBO	CRC	CIV	DAN	DIT	DLA	DTA	EME	LLA	MGU	MON	RES	TRU	YAR	ZAM	ZUL
Aragua				0–1				2–1			1–0		1–0					
El Vigía	4–2				4–2							1–1			2–1			
Carabobo						0–1					2–1			3–3	1–1	2–2	0–0	
Caracas		6–0			2–1							2–1			3–1			
Centro Ítalo	3–1							1–3			1–2		1–2					
Deportivo Anzoátegui	1–1	2–1							2–1	0–0				2–3			0–2	
Deportivo Italia			4–0			2–0							7–1			4–1	2–1	
Deportivo Lara		1–0		1–1							2–1		2–2					
Deportivo Táchira	2–1		2–0													4–3		2–0
Estudiantes			2–1		1–0		3–2		0–0		2–2							2–2
Llaneros		1–2		1–1								3–1			1–1			
Mineros	1–0				1–1		0–1	1–1							2–0			
Monagas		2–1		1–1							3–0	1–3						
Real Esppor							2–0		1–2	2–2			2–1		0–1			2–0
Trujillanos	3–1				0–1			1–3					3–0					
Yaracuyanos					0–0	3–1				2–0				1–3			1–2	
Zamora								1–1	1–1	2–0		1–1		3–2				2–1
Zulia		0–1	1–0			0–1	1–1	2–1								2–1		

Updated to match(es) played on March 31, 2010. Source: Apertura 2009 Fixture
Legend: Blue = home team win; Yellow = draw; Red = away team win.

== Aggregate table ==
Pos	Team	Pld	W	D	L	GF	GA	GD	Pts	Qualification or relegation
1	Deportivo Táchira	34	21	9	4	53	22	+31	72	2011 Copa Libertadores Second Stage
2	Caracas	34	21	7	6	66	30	+36	70	2011 Copa Libertadores Second Stage 2010 Copa Sudamericana Second Stage (Note: As 2009 Copa Venezuela champion and runner-up respectively.)
3	Deportivo Italia	34	21	6	7	62	31	+31	69	2011 Copa Libertadores First Stage
4	Deportivo Lara	34	15	14	5	49	30	+19	59	2010 Copa Sudamericana First Stage
5	Trujillanos	34	16	8	10	52	37	+15	56	2010 Copa Sudamericana First Stage
6	Zulia	34	16	5	13	53	50	+3	53	
7	Zamora	34	14	8	12	45	49	−4	50	
8	Deportivo Anzoátegui	34	14	7	13	39	39	0	49	
9	Atlético El Vigía	34	14	5	15	52	60	−8	47	
10	Mineros de Guayana	34	10	12	12	39	45	−6	42	
11	Aragua	34	11	8	15	33	45	−12	41	
12	Estudiantes de Mérida	34	8	16	10	38	38	0	40	
13	Monagas	34	11	7	16	51	52	−1	40	
14	Real Esppor	34	10	8	16	39	48	−9	38	
15	Yaracuyanos	34	9	8	17	40	56	−16	35	
16	Carabobo	34	6	13	15	32	52	−20	31	
17	Centro Ítalo (R)	34	6	8	20	36	55	−19	26	Relegation to the Segunda División
18	Llaneros (R)	34	5	7	22	38	67	−29	22	Relegation to the Segunda División

Updated to match(es) played on May 16, 2010. Source: FVF (in Spanish)
Rules for classification: 1) points; 2) goal difference; 3) number of goals scored.
(R) Relegated

== Serie Final ==
Deportivo Táchira and Caracas qualified to the Serie Final, which was contested on a home and away basis.

Pos	Team	Pld	W	D	L	GF	GA	GD	Pts
1	Caracas	2	2	0	0	5	1	+4	6
2	Deportivo Táchira	2	0	0	2	1	5	−4	0

Rules for classification: 1st points; 2nd goals scored; 3rd away goals; 4th penalty shoot-out.
May 23, 2010
16:30 (UTC-4:30)

Caracas	1–0	Deportivo Táchira
Romero 15'	Report

Estadio Olimpico de la UCV, Caracas
Attendance: 18,200
Referee: Rafael López

May 29, 2010
16:30 (UTC-4:30)

Deportivo Táchira	1–4	Caracas
Villafráz 37'	Report	Cichero 10'; Gómez 13'; Castellín 60'; Guerra 66'

Estadio Polideportivo de Pueblo Nuevo, San Cristóbal
Attendance: 40,000
Referee: José Argote

Primera División
2009–10 champion
Caracas
11th title

== See also ==
- 2009–10 in Venezuelan football
