= Jesús Meza =

Venezuelan footballer (born 1986)

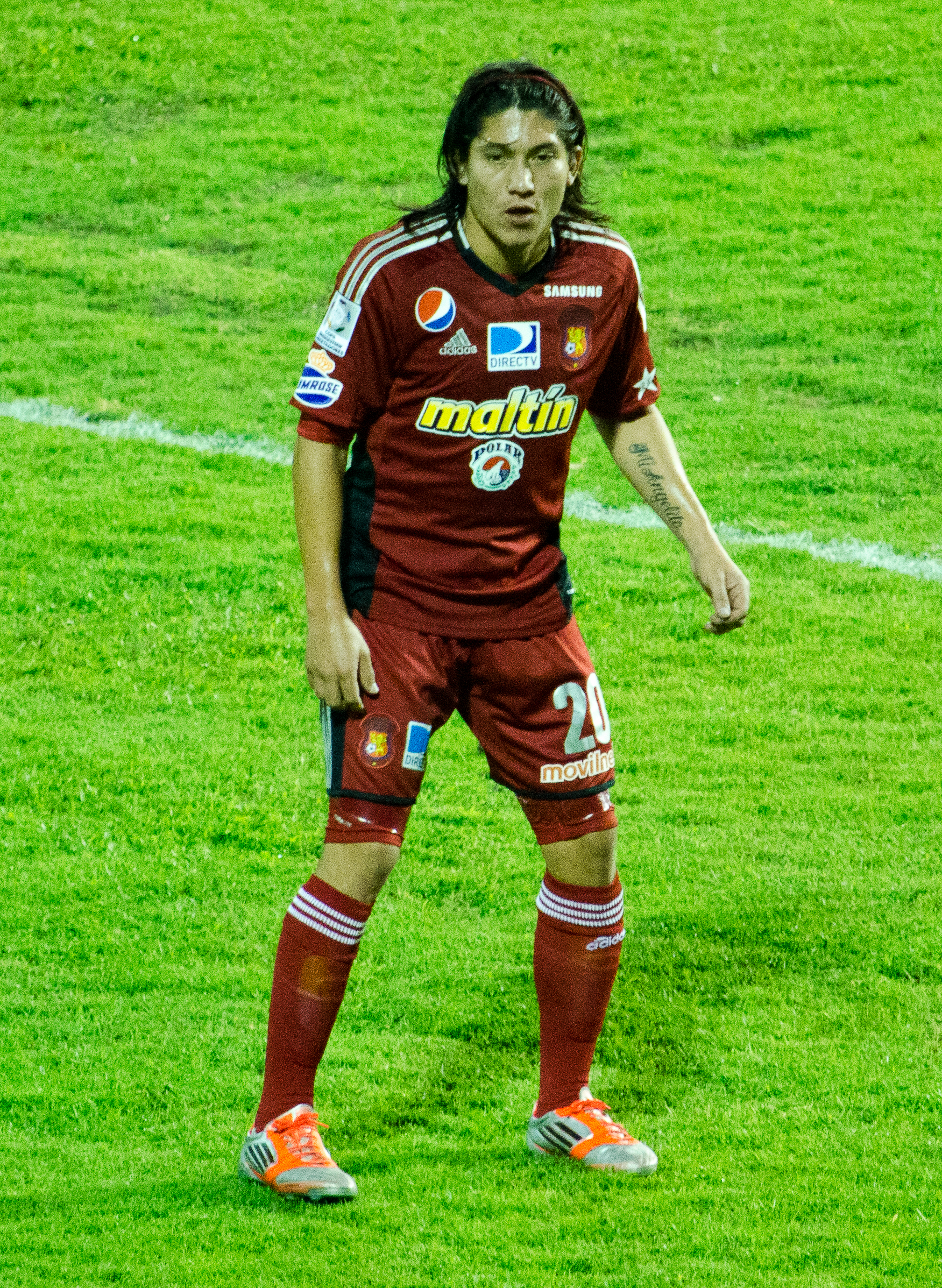
- Meza playing for Caracas in 2013

Personal information
- Full name: Jesús Manuel Meza Moreno
- Date of birth: 6 January 1986 (age 40)
- Place of birth: Mérida, Venezuela
- Height: 1.62 m (5 ft 4 in)
- Position: Attacking midfielder

Youth career
- Estudiantes

Senior career*
Years	Team	Apps	(Gls)
2004–2006	Estudiantes		
2006	Monagas		
2006–2008	Estudiantes	26	(1)
2008	Al-Ittihad	0	(0)
2008–2011	Zamora	74	(15)
2011	Atlas	4	(0)
2011–2013	Caracas	42	(7)
2013–2014	Al-Arabi	10	(3)
2013–2014	Al-Shaab	11	(1)
2014–2015	Olympiacos Volos	11	(0)
2015	Honvéd Budapest	4	(0)
2015–2016	Aragua	33	(2)
2016	Mineros de Guayana	10	(0)
2017	Barcelona Atlético	?	(?)
2018	Cibao	2	(0)
2018–2020	Estudiantes	68	(1)
2021	Academia Puerto Cabello	28	(4)
2022	Estudiantes	14	(1)
2023	Rayo Zuliano	20	(1)

International career
2007–2011	Venezuela	6	(0)
- * Club domestic league appearances and goals as of 7 May 2018

Jesús Manuel "Chiki" Meza Moreno (born 6 January 1986) is a Venezuelan footballer. He plays as an attacking midfielder.

== Club career ==
Born in Mérida, he grew up in a small neighborhood of the town. Since a boy, he showed interest in common sports like Basketball and Baseball, but his major interest was directed to Football- as his father was a great lover of that sport and influenced him to practice it. Meza started playing professionally at Estudiantes de Mérida, making his debut in the top level Venezuelan league at age 16.

After a few team changes in Venezuela, in summer 2008, he signed with Al-Ittihad Aleppo, although he never managed to play because the Syrian team had full quota for foreign players. In half season, Meza returned to Venezuela to sign for Zamora FC.

With the squad he won the 2011 Torneo Clausura, but Zamora failed to complete the national title against Deportivo Táchira. At the end of the season, he was transferred to Mexican side Club Atlas. He made his debut on 7 August 2011, in a 0–0 draw against Toluca.

However, Meza did not managed to make himself a spot in the Mexican squad, and on 26 December 2011, the team agreed a free transfer to Venezuelan giants Caracas FC. He signed a contract that will run until 2013. On 18 March 2012, he scored a goal described as "maradonian", in a league match against Aragua FC.

Meza signed on 6 June 2013 with Qatari side Al-Arabi SC.

== International career ==
He made his debut in 2007 in a friendly match against Cuba. In 2011, he was called again to play two matches in preparation for the 2011 Copa América, making the final cut in the squad.

== Club statistics ==
Accurate as of 11 January 2014. Data prior to 2006–07 season need to be confirmed.

Club	Season	League^{1}		Cup		Continental		Total	
Club	Season	Apps	Goals	Apps	Goals	Apps	Goals	Apps	Goals
Estudiantes	2006–07	1	0					1	0
Estudiantes	2007–08	25	1					25	1
Estudiantes	Total	26	1					26	1
Al-Ittihad	2008–09	0	0	0	0	0	0	0	0
Al-Ittihad	Total	0	0	0	0	0	0	0	0
Zamora	2008–09	15	3			—		15	3
Zamora	2009–10	29	4			2	0	31	4
Zamora	2010–11	30	8	8	2	—		38	10
Zamora	Total	74	15	8	2	2	0	84	17
Atlas	2011–12	4	0	0	0	0	0	4	0
Atlas	Total	4	0	0	0	0	0	4	0
Caracas	2011–12	15	3	0	0	0	0	15	3
Caracas	2012–13	27	4	5	1	0	0	32	5
Caracas	Total	42	7	5	1	0	0	47	8
Al-Arabi	2013–14	10	3	4	1	—		14	4
Al-Arabi	Total	10	3	4	1	0	0	14	4
Career totals		156	26	17	4	2	0	175	30

^{1}Includes two matches of the championship final in 2010–11 season.
