= José Maurício =

José Maurício may refer to:

Full name:

- José Maurício (Portuguese composer) (1752-1815)

Portuguese first name:

- José Maurício Nunes Garcia, Brazilian composer
- José Maurício Bustani, diplomat

== See also ==
Spanish first name without accent on Maurício:

- José Mauricio Parra, Venezuelan footballer
