= Rubert Quijada =

Venezuelan footballer (born 1989)

Personal information
- Full name: Rubert José Quijada Fasciana
- Date of birth: February 10, 1989 (age 37)
- Place of birth: Caripito, Venezuela
- Height: 1.80 m (5 ft 11 in)
- Positions: Left-back; centre-back

Senior career*
| Years | Team | Apps | (Gls) |
| 2009–2010 | Zulia | 2 | (0) |
| 2010–2012 | Monagas | 55 | (1) |
| 2012–2024 | Caracas | 301 | (28) |
| 2017–2018 | → Al-Gharafa (loan) | 20 | (1) |
| 2020–2021 | → Alianza Lima (loan) | 18 | (0) |
| 2021 | → Rionegro Águilas (loan) | 3 | (0) |

International career^{‡}
| 2012–2017 | Venezuela | 7 | (0) |
- * Club domestic league appearances and goals as of 16 November 2024 ‡ National team caps and goals as of 13 November 2017

Rubert José Quijada Fasciana (born 10 February 1989 in Maturín) is a Venezuelan footballer. as a left-back and centre-back.

== Career statistics ==
=== Club ===
As of match played 16 November 2024

Appearances and goals by club, season and competition
| Club | Season | League | | | National cup | | Continental | | Other | | Total | |
| Club | Season | Division | Apps | Goals | Apps | Goals | Apps | Goals | Apps | Goals | Apps | Goals |
|---|---|---|---|---|---|---|---|---|---|---|---|---|
| Zulia | 2009–10 | Venezuelan Primera División | 2 | 0 | — | | — | | — | | 2 | 0 |
| Monagas | 2010–11 | Venezuelan Primera División | 21 | 1 | — | | — | | — | | 21 | 1 |
| Monagas | 2011–12 | Venezuelan Primera División | 34 | 0 | — | | — | | — | | 34 | 0 |
| Monagas | Total | | 55 | 1 | — | | — | | — | | 55 | 1 |
| Caracas | 2012–13 | Venezuelan Primera División | 31 | 2 | — | | 5 | 0 | — | | 36 | 2 |
| Caracas | 2013–14 | Venezuelan Primera División | 28 | 6 | — | | 2 | 0 | — | | 30 | 6 |
| Caracas | 2014–15 | Venezuelan Primera División | 28 | 2 | — | | 3 | 1 | — | | 31 | 3 |
| Caracas | 2015 | Venezuelan Primera División | 17 | 1 | 4 | 1 | — | | — | | 21 | 2 |
| Caracas | 2016 | Venezuelan Primera División | 41 | 4 | — | | 2 | 1 | — | | 43 | 5 |
| Caracas | 2017 | Venezuelan Primera División | 21 | 2 | — | | 2 | 1 | — | | 23 | 3 |
| Caracas | 2018 | Venezuelan Primera División | 17 | 3 | — | | 4 | 0 | — | | 21 | 3 |
| Caracas | 2019 | Venezuelan Primera División | 34 | 2 | 2 | 0 | 3 | 0 | — | | 39 | 2 |
| Caracas | 2022 | Venezuelan Primera División | 28 | 1 | — | | 4 | 0 | — | | 32 | 1 |
| Caracas | 2023 | Venezuelan Primera División | 26 | 4 | — | | 1 | 0 | — | | 27 | 4 |
| Caracas | 2024 | Venezuelan Primera División | 20 | 1 | 2 | 0 | 4 | 0 | — | | 26 | 1 |
| Caracas | Total | | 291 | 28 | 8 | 1 | 30 | 3 | — | | 329 | 32 |
| Al-Gharafa (loan) | 2017–18 | Qatar Stars League | 20 | 1 | 1 | 0 | 5 | 1 | 4 | 0 | 30 | 2 |
| Alianza Lima (loan) | 2020 | Peruvian Primera División | 18 | 0 | — | | 6 | 0 | — | | 24 | 0 |
| Rionegro Águilas (loan) | 2021 | Categoría Primera A | 3 | 0 | — | | — | | — | | 3 | 0 |
| Career total | | | 389 | 30 | 9 | 1 | 41 | 3 | 4 | 0 | 443 | 35 |

=== International ===
As of match played 13 November 2017

Appearances and goals by national team and year
| National team | Year | Apps | Goals |
|---|---|---|---|
| Venezuela | 2012 | 2 | 0 |
| Venezuela | 2014 | 0 | 0 |
| Venezuela | 2016 | 1 | 0 |
| Venezuela | 2017 | 4 | 0 |
| Total | | 7 | 0 |
