= José Parra =

José Parra is the name of:

- José Parra (baseball) (born 1972), baseball player from the Dominican Republic
- José Parra (footballer) (1925–2016), Spanish footballer
- José Felipe Parra (1780–1846), Spanish painter
- José Mauricio Parra (born 1990), Venezuelan footballer
- José Miguel Parra (1780–1846), Spanish painter
