= Cristhian Rivas =

Venezuelan footballer (born 1997)

Personal information
- Full name: Cristhian Yonaiker Rivas Vielma
- Date of birth: 20 January 1997 (age 29)
- Place of birth: Mérida, Venezuela
- Height: 1.68 m (5 ft 6 in)
- Position: Midfielder

Team information
- Current team: Estudiantes de Mérida

Youth career
- Estudiantes de Mérida

Senior career*
Years	Team	Apps	(Gls)
2015–2023	Estudiantes de Mérida	170	(7)
2022	Cuiabá	2	(0)
2023–	Monagas SC	4	(0)

International career^{‡}
2017	Venezuela U20	4	(0)
- * Club domestic league appearances and goals as of 21:20, 05 Juny 2023 (UTC). ‡ National team caps and goals as of 20:20, 05 Juny 2023 (UTC).

Cristhian Yonaiker Rivas Vielma (born 20 January 1997) is a Venezuelan footballer who plays as a midfielder of Estudiantes de Mérida.

== Career statistics ==
=== Club ===
As of 9 May 2022

Club	Season	League			Cup		Continental		State League		Other		Total	
Club	Season	Division	Apps	Goals	Apps	Goals	Apps	Goals	Apps	Goals	Apps	Goals	Apps	Goals
Estudiantes de Mérida	2015	Primera División	17	1	4	1	—		—		—		21	2
Estudiantes de Mérida	2016	Primera División	25	1	0	0	—		—		—		3	1
Estudiantes de Mérida	2017	Primera División	26	3	1	0	—		—		—		27	3
Estudiantes de Mérida	2018	Primera División	25	1	0	0	1 (Note: Appearance(s) in Copa Sudamericana)	0	—		—		26	1
Estudiantes de Mérida	2019	Primera División	38	0	1	0	2	0	—		—		41	0
Estudiantes de Mérida	2020	Primera División	13	0	—		8 (Note: Six appearances in Copa Libertadores, two appearances in Copa Sudamericana)	0	—		—		21	0
Estudiantes de Mérida	2021	Primera División	26	1	—		—		—		—		26	1
Estudiantes de Mérida	Total		170	7	6	1	11	0	—		—		187	8
Cuiabá	2022	Série A	2	0	0	0	3	0	0	0	—		5	0
Career total			172	7	6	1	14	0	0	0	0	0	192	8
