= Edanyilber Navas =

Venezuelan footballer (born 2000)

Personal information
- Full name: Edanyilber José Navas Alayón
- Date of birth: 21 January 2000 (age 26)
- Place of birth: Venezuela
- Position: Midfielder

Team information
- Current team: Monagas
- Number: 10

Youth career
- –2016: Aragua

Senior career*
Years	Team	Apps	(Gls)
2016–	Aragua	85	(13)
- * Club domestic league appearances and goals as of 3 March 2020

Edanyilber José Navas Alayón (born 14 January 2000) is a Venezuelan footballer who plays as a midfielder for Venezuelan Primera División side Monagas S.C.

== Club career ==
Navas made his senior debut in the 2016 Copa Venezuela, and featured as Aragua suffered a shock defeat by Tucanes de Amazonas. He made his league debut in a 1–1 draw with Estudiantes de Mérida.

== Career statistics ==
=== Club ===
As of 11 June 2017

Club performance		League		Cup		Continental		Total	
Club	Season	Apps	Goals	Apps	Goals	Apps	Goals	Apps	Goals
Venezuela		Primera División		Copa Venezuela		Continental		Total	
Aragua	2016	0	0	2	0	0	0	2	0
Aragua	2017	12	0	0	0	0	0	12	0
Total		12	0	2	0	0	0	14	0
Total	Venezuela	12	0	2	0	0	0	14	0
Total	Career total	12	0	2	0	0	0	14	0
