= Henry Plazas =

Venezuelan footballer (born 1992)

Personal information
- Full name: Henry Junior Plazas Mendoza
- Date of birth: 12 December 1992 (age 33)
- Place of birth: Mérida, Venezuela
- Height: 1.89 m (6 ft 2 in)
- Position: Center-back

Team information
- Current team: Thrissur Magic FC
- Number: 4

Senior career*
Years	Team	Apps	(Gls)
2010–2015	Estudiantes de Mérida	47	(3)
2014–2015	→ Aragua (loan)	15	(1)
2015–2019	Zulia	74	(7)
2019	Aragua	40	(4)
2020	Estudiantes de Mérida	16	(3)
2021–2024	Boyacá Chicó	158	(25)
2025	Estudiantes de Mérida	9	(0)
2025	Cúcuta Deportivo	11	(1)
2026	Anzoátegui		
- * Club domestic league appearances and goals

Henry Junior Plazas Mendoza (born 12 December 1992) is a Venezuelan professional footballer who plays as a defender.
