= Néstor Canelón =

Venezuelan footballer (born 1991)

Personal information
- Full name: Néstor Eduardo Canelón Gil
- Date of birth: 19 August 1991 (age 35)
- Place of birth: Caracas, Venezuela
- Height: 1.70 m (5 ft 7 in)
- Position: Winger

Team information
- Current team: Dynamo Puerto
- Number: 23

Youth career
- Universidad Central

Senior career*
Years	Team	Apps	(Gls)
2012–2013	Caracas	0	(0)
2013–2015	Deportivo La Guaira	16	(2)
2015	Petare FC	18	(5)
2016–2017	Deportivo Anzoátegui	56	(7)
2017–2019	Caracas	59	(9)
2019	→ Santiago Wanderers (loan)	12	(5)
2020–2021	Santiago Wanderers	48	(4)
2022	Universidad Central	12	(2)
2022	Deportes Recoleta	14	(0)
2023–2024	Estudiantes de Mérida	49	(5)
2025–	Dynamo Puerto	17	(2)
- * Club domestic league appearances and goals as of 5 January 2026

Néstor Eduardo Canelón Gil (born 19 August 1991) is a Venezuelan footballer who plays as a winger for Dynamo Puerto.

== Career ==
As a teenager, Canelón switched from baseball to football, scoring 7 goals in his 1st game.

In 2013, he signed for Venezuelan top flight side Deportivo La Guaira after failing to make an appearance for Caracas, Venezuela's most successful club, but suffered an injury.

In 2017, he returned to Caracas.

In 2019, Canelón signed for Santiago Wanderers in Chile.

In 2022, after a brief step with Universidad Central in Venezuela, he returned to Chile and joined Deportes Recoleta.

In 2025, Canelón joined Dynamo Puerto in the Venezuelan Segunda División.
