= Jorge Echeverría =

Venezuelan footballer (born 2000)

Personal information
- Full name: Jorge Eliézer Echeverría Montilva
- Date of birth: 13 February 2000 (age 26)
- Place of birth: San Cristóbal, Venezuela
- Position: Midfielder

Team information
- Current team: Trujillanos

Youth career
- Caracas

Senior career*
| Years | Team | Apps | (Gls) |
| 2016–2021 | Caracas | 69 | (9) |
| 2022 | Aragua | 25 | (3) |
| 2023 | Mineros de Guayana | 10 | (2) |
| 2025 | Academia Puerto Cabello | 16 | (0) |
| 2026- | Trujillanos | 5 | (0) |

International career
| 2017 | Venezuela U17 | 6 | (1) |
| 2018–2019 | Venezuela U20 | 13 | (1) |
- * Club domestic league appearances and goals as of 18:13, 17 June 2021 (UTC)

Jorge Eliézer Echeverría Montilva (born 13 February 2000) is a Venezuelan football player who plays as midfielder for Trujillanos in Venezuelan Primera División.
