= Estadio Guillermo Soto Rosa =

Football stadium in Mérida, Venezuela

Coordinates: 8°36′N 71°09′W

Estadio Olímpico Guillermo Soto Rosa
- Interactive map of Estadio Olímpico Guillermo Soto Rosa
- Location: Mérida, Venezuela
- Capacity: 14,000

Construction
- Opened: September 5, 1969

Tenants
- Estudiantes de Mérida (1971-2005); University of the Andes, Venezuela

Estadio Guillermo Soto Rosa is a multi-use stadium in Mérida, Venezuela. It is currently used mostly for football matches and was the home stadium of Estudiantes de Mérida Fútbol Club until Estadio Metropolitano de Mérida opened in 2005. It currently hosts the home matches of the ULA football team. The stadium holds 14,000 spectators.
