= Anderson Contreras =

Venezuelan footballer (born 2001)

Personal information
- Full name: Anderson Rafael Contreras Pérez
- Date of birth: 30 March 2001 (age 25)
- Place of birth: Socopó, Venezuela
- Height: 1.77 m (5 ft 10 in)
- Position: Midfielder

Team information
- Current team: Monagas

Senior career*
Years	Team	Apps	(Gls)
2015–2024	Caracas	78	(4)
2021–2022	→ Universidad de Chile (loan)	0	(0)
2022	→ Audax Italiano (loan)	0	(0)
2025–	Monagas	4	(1)

International career^{‡}
2020	Venezuela U23	1	(0)
- * Club domestic league appearances and goals as of 26 September 2021 ‡ National team caps and goals as of 31 January 2020

Anderson Rafael Contreras Pérez (born Socopó, Venezuela; 30 March 2001) is a Venezuelan footballer who plays for Monagas. He has also played for the Venezuela under-23 football team.

== Career ==
After playing for Caracas, in September 2021, he was loaned to Universidad de Chile in the Chilean Primera División on a deal until the end of the 2022 season, but in 2022 he was loaned to Audax Italiano, returning to Caracas after ending his contract with Universidad de Chile.

== Career statistics ==
=== Club ===
As of 11 January 2020.

Club	Season	League			Cup		Continental		Other		Total	
Club	Season	Division	Apps	Goals	Apps	Goals	Apps	Goals	Apps	Goals	Apps	Goals
Caracas	2018	Venezuelan Primera División	0	0	2 (Note: Appearances in the Copa Venezuela)	0	0	0	0	0	2	0
Caracas	2019	Venezuelan Primera División	24	1	2	0	1 (Note: Appearances in the Copa Sudamericana)	0	0	0	27	1
Career total			24	1	4	0	1	0	0	0	29	1

== Honours ==
Caracas

- Venezuelan Primera División (1): 2019
