= Daniel Saggiomo =

Venezuelan footballer (born 1998)

Personal information
- Full name: Daniel Alessandro Saggiomo Mosquera
- Date of birth: 2 July 1998 (age 28)
- Place of birth: Caracas, Venezuela
- Height: 1.69 m (5 ft 7 in)
- Position: Forward

Team information
- Current team: Academia Puerto Cabello

Senior career*
Years	Team	Apps	(Gls)
2014–2019	Caracas	107	(8)
2020	Lorca Deportiva	5	(0)
2020–2023	Argentinos Juniors	1	(0)
2022–2023	→ Atlanta (loan)	22	(0)
2023	Deportivo La Guaira	23	(1)
2024-2025	Deportivo Tachira	51	(3)
2026-	Academia Puerto Cabello	2	(0)

International career^{‡}
2015	Venezuela U17	3	(0)
2017–2018	Venezuela U20	8	(2)
2020–	Venezuela U23	3	(0)
- * Club domestic league appearances and goals as of 14 April 2025 ‡ National team caps and goals as of 15 February 2020

Daniel Alessandro Saggiomo Mosquera (born 2 July 1998) is a Venezuelan footballer who plays for Academia Puerto Cabello.

== Career statistics ==
=== Club ===
As of 3 January 2023.

Club	Season	League			Cup		Continental		Other		Total	
Club	Season	Division	Apps	Goals	Apps	Goals	Apps	Goals	Apps	Goals	Apps	Goals
Caracas	2014–15	Venezuelan Primera División	2	0	0	0	0	0	0	0	2	0
Caracas	2015	Venezuelan Primera División	15	1	2 (Note: Appearances in the Copa Venezuela)	0	0	0	0	0	17	1
Caracas	2016	Venezuelan Primera División	17	1	0	0	0	0	0	0	17	1
Caracas	2017	Venezuelan Primera División	10	0	2	0	0	0	0	0	12	0
Caracas	2018	Venezuelan Primera División	31	0	1	1	4 (Note: Appearances in the Copa Sudamericana)	0	0	0	36	1
Caracas	2019	Venezuelan Primera División	32	6	0	0	6 (Note: Two appearances in the Copa Sudamericana, four appearances in the Copa Libertadores)	0	0	0	38	6
Caracas	Total		107	8	5	0	10	0	0	0	122	8
Lorca Deportiva	2019–20	Tercera División	5	0	0	0	0	0	0	0	5	0
Career total			112	8	5	0	10	0	0	0	127	8
