= Edson Rivas =

Venezuelan footballer (born 2001)

Personal information
- Full name: Edson Armando Rivas Vielma
- Date of birth: 23 October 2001 (age 25)
- Place of birth: Mérida, Venezuela
- Height: 1.86 m (6 ft 1 in)
- Position: Forward

Team information
- Current team: Marítimo de La Guaira
- Number: 9

Youth career
- –2018: Estudiantes de Mérida

Senior career*
| Years | Team | Apps | (Gls) |
| 2018–2021 | Estudiantes de Mérida | 77 | (10) |
| 2022 | Deportivo La Guaira | 24 | (2) |
| 2023–2024 | Caracas | 24 | (3) |
| 2024 | Universidad Central | 11 | (0) |
| 2024 | Fleetwood United | 1 | (0) |
| 2024–2025 | Emerald | | |
| 2025 | CBJ Cali | 9 | (0) |
| 2025– | Marítimo de La Guaira | 0 | (0) |
- * Club domestic league appearances and goals as of 10 November 2021

Edson Rivas (born 23 October 2001) is a Venezuelan professional footballer who plays for Marítimo de La Guaira as a forward.
