= José Maurício (Portuguese composer) =

Portuguese composer

José Maurício (Coimbra, 19 March 1752 - Figueira da Foz, 12 September 1815) was a Portuguese composer mainly known for his prolific production of sacred music.

A native of Coimbra, Mauricio began as singer and organist and rose to become both chapel master at Coimbra Cathedral, and music professor at the Universidade de Coimbra during the reforms of João VI.

== Works ==
- Requiem
- Miserere

Like many other church composers of his time he also composed secular songs, modinhas.
