= Andrés Montero =

Venezuelan football player (born 1994)

Personal information
- Full name: Andrés Eduardo Montero Cárdenas
- Date of birth: 5 March 1994 (age 32)
- Place of birth: Maracaibo, Zulia, Venezuela
- Height: 1.75 m (5 ft 9 in)
- Positions: Attacking midfielder; forward

Team information
- Current team: Rayo Zuliano
- Number: 11

Youth career
- –2014: Zulia

Senior career*
Years	Team	Apps	(Gls)
2013–2016	Zulia	62	(3)
2016	→ Luftëtari (loan)	9	(1)
2017–2018	Deportivo Lara	11	(1)
2018	→ Carabobo (loan)	36	(6)
2019	Deportivo Táchira	22	(2)
2020	Coquimbo Unido	9	(0)
2021	Deportivo Pasto	1	(0)
2021	Zamora	10	(1)
2022	Envigado	8	(0)
2023	Academia Puerto Cabello	11	(0)
2024	Portuguesa	9	(2)
2024—	Rayo Zuliano	7	(4)
- * Club domestic league appearances and goals as of 14 October 2020

Andrés Eduardo Montero Cárdenas (born 5 March 1994) is a Venezuelan footballer who plays for Rayo Zuliano as an attacking midfielder.

== Career ==
After playing for several clubs from his native country, even at the Copa Libertadores along with Carabobo on 2018, and a short-term experience in Europe playing for Albanian club Luftëtari on 2016, he joined Chilean club Coquimbo Unido on 2020 season, playing also at the 2020 Copa Sudamericana.

On 2 November 2020, he left Coquimbo Unido by mutual agreement because he decided to return to Venezuela.

== Career statistics ==
=== Club ===
As of 25 September 2020.

Club	Season	League			Cup		Continental		Other		Total	
Club	Season	Division	Apps	Goals	Apps	Goals	Apps	Goals	Apps	Goals	Apps	Goals
Zulia	2013–14	Venezuelan; Primera División	5	0	0	0	0	0	0	0	5	0
Zulia	2014–15	Venezuelan; Primera División	19	1	0	0	0	0	0	0	19	1
Zulia	2015	Venezuelan; Primera División	11	1	0	0	0	0	0	0	11	1
Zulia	2016	Venezuelan; Primera División	27	1	2	1	0	0	0	0	29	2
Zulia	Total		62	3	2 (Note: Appearances in the Copa Venezuela)	1	0	0	0	0	64	4
Luftëtari (loan)	2016	Kategoria Superiore	9	1	2 (Note: Appearances in the Kupa e Shqipërisë)	0	0	0	0	0	11	1
Deportivo Lara	2017	Venezuelan; Primera División	11	1	0	0	0	0	0	0	11	1
Carabobo (loan)	2018	Venezuelan; Primera División	36	6	3	0	2 (Note: Appearances in the Copa Libertadores)	0	0	0	41	6
Deportivo Táchira	2019	Venezuelan; Primera División	22	2	2	3	0	0	0	0	24	5
Coquimbo Unido	2020	Chilean; Primera División	9	0	0	0	2 (Note: Appearances in the Copa Sudamericana)	0	0	0	9	0
Total career			149	13	9	4	4	0	0	0	162	17

== Honours ==
=== Club ===
Deportivo Lara

- Primera División (1): 2017–C (Note: Monagas was the champion of the all 2017 season.)

Deportivo Táchira

- Friendlies (1): 2019 Cuadrangular Internacional Copa 45 Años
