= Julio Quintero =

Venezuelan footballer (born 1964)

Personal information
- Date of birth: 31 October 1964 (age 61)

International career
Years	Team	Apps	(Gls)
1987	Venezuela	1	(0)

Julio Quintero (born 31 October 1964) is a Venezuelan footballer. He played in one match for the Venezuela national football team in 1987. He was also part of Venezuela's squad for the 1987 Copa América tournament.
