= Jonathan España =

Venezuelan footballer (born 1988)

Personal information
- Full name: Jonathan Joan España Santiago
- Date of birth: 13 November 1988 (age 37)
- Place of birth: Ciudad Ojeda, Venezuela
- Height: 1.86 m (6 ft 1 in)
- Position: Centre back

Senior career*
Years	Team	Apps	(Gls)
2010–2012	Trujillanos	34	(1)
2012–2014	Zamora	59	(2)
2014–2015	AEL Limassol	8	(0)
2016–2017	Atlético Venezuela	65	(1)
2018	Deportivo Táchira	9	(0)
2019-2021	Deportivo Lara	34	(1)
2022	Zamora	15	(0)
- * Club domestic league appearances and goals as of 2 May 2018

Jonathan Joan España Santiago (born 13 November 1988) is a Venezuelan professional footballer as a defender.

== Club career ==
Born in Ciudad Ojeda, Jonathan España spent four years in Venezuelan Primera División between 2010 and 2014.

On 22 June 2014 he moved abroad for the first time, joining one compatriot at Cypriot First Division club AEL Limassol.
