= Jarol Herrera =

Colombian footballer (born 1984)

Járol Herrera
Personal information
- Full name: Járol Herrera Martínez
- Date of birth: 26 May 1984 (age 42)
- Place of birth: Cartagena, Colombia
- Height: 1.73 m (5 ft 8 in)
- Position: Midfielder

Team information
- Current team: Atlético Vega Real
- Number: 7

Youth career
- –2002: Deportivo Cali

Senior career*
Years	Team	Apps	(Gls)
2002–2009	Deportivo Cali	111	(6)
2003–2004	→ Atlético Huila (loan)	29	(1)
2005	→ Monagas (loan)	10	(1)
2010	Cúcuta Deportivo	11	(0)
2010–2013	Monagas	104	(9)
2013–2015	Trujillanos	68	(8)
2015–2017	Aragua	100	(16)
2018–2020	Atlético Pantoja		
2021–	Atlético Vega Real	17	(9)
- * Club domestic league appearances and goals as of 9 May 2022

Járol Herrera Martínez (born 26 May 1984) is a Colombian footballer who plays as a midfielder for Dominican club Atlético Vega Real.

== Honors ==
Deportivo Cali

- Categoría Primera A: Finalización 2005

Trujillanos

- Venezuelan Primera División: Apertura 2014

Atlético Pantoja

- Liga Dominicana de Fútbol: 2019
