= Jesús Valiente =

Venezuelan football manager (born 1974)

Personal information
- Full name: Jesús Alberto Valiente Briceño
- Date of birth: 28 August 1974 (age 52)
- Place of birth: Escuque, Venezuela
- Height: 1.76 m (5 ft 9 in)
- Position: Midfielder

Team information
- Current team: Trujillanos (youth coordinator)

Youth career
- Escuque FC
- Trujillanos

Senior career*
Years	Team	Apps	(Gls)
1994–1998	Trujillanos		
1998–1999	Internacional de Lara		
2000	Zulianos		
2001	Caracas		
2002–2007	Trujillanos		
2007–2008	Zamora		
2008–2009	Atlético Trujillo		
2009–2010	Trujillanos		

International career
1996–1997	Venezuela	9	(0)

Managerial career
- 2012–2013: Trujillanos (youth)
- 2014–2019: Trujillanos (assistant)
- 2016: Trujillanos (interim)
- 2019: Trujillanos
- 2019–2021: Trujillanos (assistant)
- 2021: Trujillanos
- * Club domestic league appearances and goals

Jesús Alberto Valiente Briceño (born 28 August 1974) is a Venezuelan football manager and former player who played as a midfielder. He is the current coordinator of Trujillanos' youth categories.

== Career ==
During his playing career, Rodríguez notably represented Trujillanos, while also playing for other teams in the country. He also played for the Venezuela national team on nine occasions, and represented the nation in the 1997 Copa América.
