= Jesús Gómez (footballer, born 1984) =

Venezuelan footballer

Personal information
- Full name: Jesús Javier Gómez Mercado
- Date of birth: 6 August 1984 (age 42)
- Place of birth: Maracay, Aragua, Venezuela
- Height: 1.68 m (5 ft 6 in)
- Position: Forward

Team information
- Current team: Estudiantes de Mérida (manager)

Youth career
- 2000–2003: Estudiantes de Mérida

Senior career*
Years	Team	Apps	(Gls)
2004–2006	Estudiantes de Mérida	27	(13)
2006–2007	Raja Casablanca	10	(4)
2007–2008	Al-Ittihad	35	(11)
2008–2012	Caracas	55	(10)
2011	Lierse	0	(0)
2011	Wadi Degla	5	(2)
2012	Caracas	13	(1)
2012–2013	Deportivo Lara	30	(1)
2013–2014	Delfines	30	(8)
2014–2015	Dorados	31	(3)
2015–2016	Necaxa	40	(3)
2016–2017	Atlante	15	(2)
2017–2019	Estudiantes de Mérida	86	(14)
2020	Atlético Venezuela	10	(1)
2021–2023	Estudiantes de Mérida	67	(12)

International career
2005–2011	Venezuela	16	(1)

Managerial career
- 2025: Academia Puerto Cabello (youth)
- 2026–: Estudiantes de Mérida
- * Club domestic league appearances and goals

Jesús Javier Gómez Mercado (Spanish pronunciation: [xeˈsus ˈɣomeθ], born 6 August 1984) is a Venezuelan football manager and former player who played as an attacking midfielder or also as a striker. He is the current manager of Estudiantes de Mérida.

== Club career ==
Product of Estudiantes de Mérida youth ranks, Gómez made his professional debut in 2004, breaking out the first team in the 2005–06 season, where played very well, that sealed his sale to Moroccan side Raja Casablanca. However, failing to repeat his performances, he joined Syrian club Al-Ittihad, where he had rematch. On 12 March 2008, the player made his AFC Champions League debut in a 2–0 win over Sepahan, where scored the first goal after a free kick.

In June 2008, Gómez returned to Venezuela and joined powerhouse club Caracas, where he won his first professional title (2008–09 Primera División) and was part of the Copa Libertadores' historic squad nicknamed "Los Rojos de Ávila" that was the first Venezuelan team to reach the quarterfinals of the competition. Gómez was selected by the FVF, clubs and players as Primera División most valuable player.

In early 2011, Jupiler League club Lierse signed Gómez for an undisclosed fee. However, he failed to play at the Belgian club, joining Wadi Degla of Egypt on loan, where he scored two goals in five EPL games. After a frustrating spell abroad, he returned to Caracas, joining ACD Lara in mid-2012. After one season at the Lara–based club, on 13 June 2013, he rescinded his contract, and joined Mexican club Delfines del Carmen.

After playing for Dorados de Sinaloa, Necaxa and Atlante in Mexico, Gómez returned to Venezuela in 2017 with his first club Estudiantes de Mérida. He then spent the 2020 season at Atlético Venezuela, before returning to his previous club in the following year and retiring with them in 2023, aged 39.

== International career ==
In August 2005, Gómez received a call-up to the Venezuela squad from coach Richard Paez, making his debut on 17 August in a 3–1 friendly match defeat against Ecuador, and scoring his first goal on 1 March 2006 during another friendly against Colombia in a 1–1 draw played in Maracaibo at Pachencho Romero.

== Managerial career ==
Gómez was a manager of Academia Puerto Cabello's youth sides in 2025, before being announced as manager of Estudiantes de Mérida on 30 October of that year.

== Career statistics ==
=== International ===
Appearances and goals by national team and year
National team	Year	Apps	Goals
Venezuela	2005	2	0
Venezuela	2006	6	1
Venezuela	2007	2	0
Venezuela	2008	–	
Venezuela	2009	–	
Venezuela	2010	3	0
Venezuela	2011	3	0
Total		16	1

Scores and results list Venezuela's goal tally first, score column indicates score after each Gómez goal.

List of international goals scored by Jesús Gómez
No.	Date	Venue	Opponent	Score	Result	Competition
1	1 March 2006	Estadio José Pachencho Romero, Maracaibo, Venezuela	Colombia	1–0	1–1	Friendly

== Honours ==
=== Club ===
Caracas

- Primera División (2): 2008–09, 2009–10
- Copa Venezuela (1): 2009

=== Individual ===
- Venezuelan Primera División Most Valuable Player (1): 2009–10
