= Estadio Antonio José de Sucre =

Stadium in Venezuela

Coordinates: 5°40′07″N 67°37′07″W

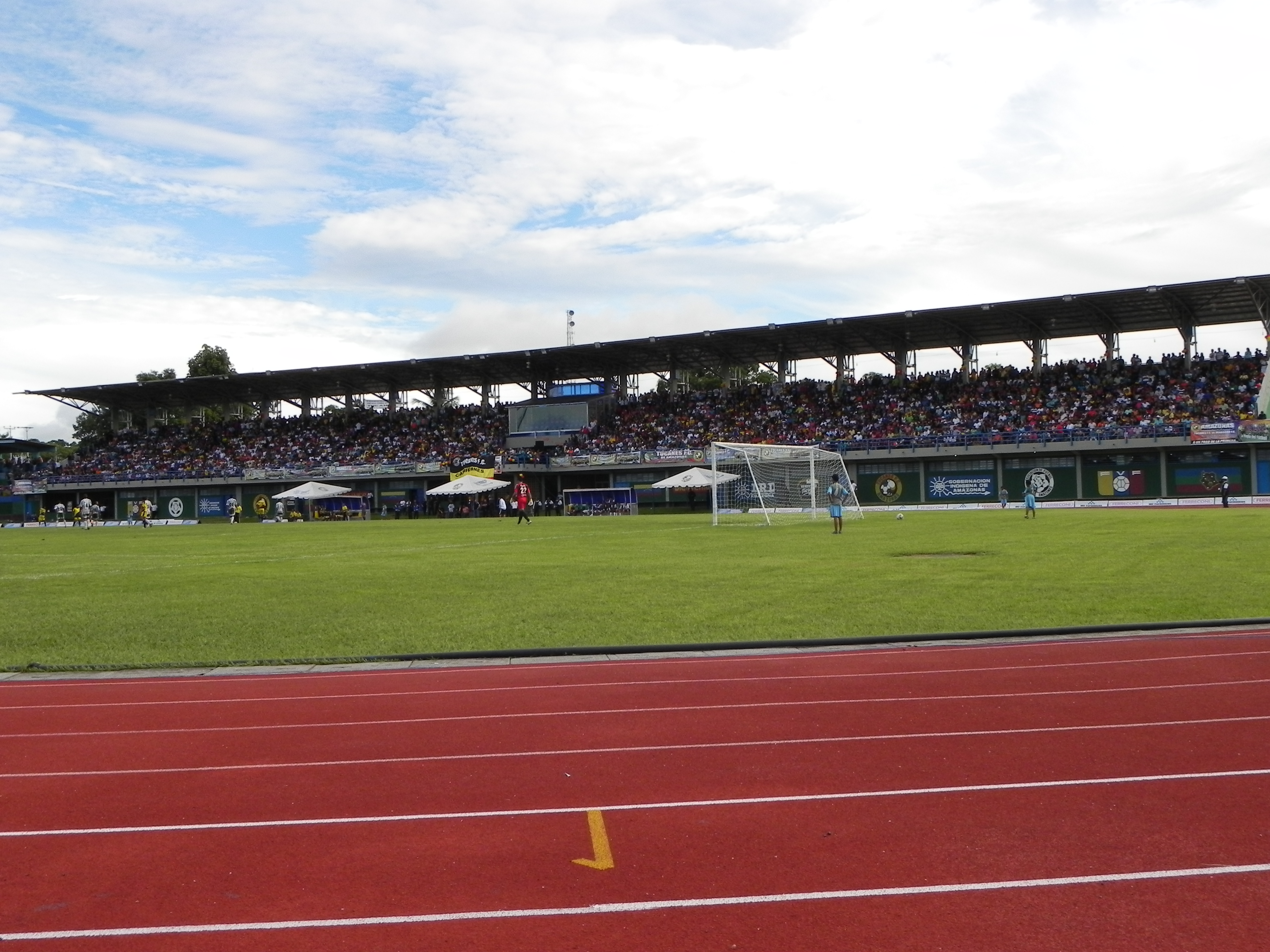
- Interactive map of Estadio Antonio José de Sucre
- Full name: Estadio Antonio José de Sucre
- Location: Puerto Ayacucho, Venezuela
- Capacity: 10,000
- Surface: Grass

Tenant
- Tucanes de Amazonas

Estadio Antonio José de Sucre is a stadium in Puerto Ayacucho, Venezuela. It has a capacity of 10,000 spectators. It is the home of Tucanes de Amazonas of the Venezuelan Segunda División.
