= Mauricio Parra =

Venezuelan footballer (born 1990)

Personal information
- Full name: José Mauricio Parra Perdomo
- Date of birth: 6 February 1990 (age 36)
- Place of birth: San Cristóbal, Táchira, Venezuela
- Height: 1.70 m (5 ft 7 in)
- Position: Centre midfielder

Youth career
- ?–?: Monagas
- ?–2008: Deportivo Táchira

Senior career*
| Years | Team | Apps | (Gls) |
| 2008–2013 | Deportivo Táchira | 78 | (5) |
| 2013–2014 | Deportivo Lara | 23 | (2) |
| 2014–2015 | Aragua | 21 | (2) |
| 2015 | Llaneros de Guanare | 16 | (3) |
| 2016 | Ureña SC | 21 | (2) |
| 2016 | Defensor La Bocana | 10 | (2) |
| 2017 | Monagas | ? | (?) |
| 2018 | Aragua | 11 | (0) |

International career
| 2007–2010 | Venezuela U-20 | ? | (?) |
| 2011– | Venezuela | 3 | (0) |
- * Club domestic league appearances and goals

José Mauricio Parra Perdomo (born 6 February 1990) is a Venezuelan footballer who most recently played for Aragua as a midfielder.

== Club ==
=== Deportivo Táchira ===
- Venezuelan Primera División (3): 2008, 2009-10, 2010-11
