= Pedro Ramírez (footballer, born 1992) =

Venezuelan footballer (born 1992)

Personal information
- Full name: Pedro Antonio Ramírez Paredes
- Date of birth: 24 August 1992 (age 34)
- Place of birth: Barrancas, Venezuela
- Height: 1.65 m (5 ft 5 in)
- Position: Attacking midfielder

Team information
- Current team: Zamora

Youth career
- –2010: Zamora

Senior career*
Years	Team	Apps	(Gls)
2010–2014	Zamora	94	(14)
2014–2016	Sion	7	(0)
2016	→ Zamora (loan)	38	(6)
2017	Deportivo Táchira	32	(5)
2018	ACD Lara	12	(0)
2018–2020	Zamora	50	(3)
2021	Inter de Barinas	18	(2)
2022–	Zamora	36	(3)

International career^{‡}
2014–	Venezuela	1	(0)
- * Club domestic league appearances and goals as of 31 May 2018 ‡ National team caps and goals as of 25 October 2014

Pedro Antonio Ramírez Paredes (born 24 August 1992) is a Venezuelan footballer who plays as an attacking midfielder for Zamora.
