= Edgar Pérez Greco =

Venezuelan footballer (born 1982)

Édgar Pérez Greco
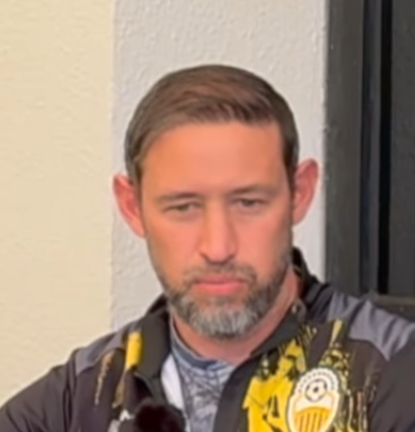
- Pérez Greco in 2025

Personal information
- Full name: Édgar Fernando Pérez Greco
- Date of birth: 16 February 1982 (age 44)
- Place of birth: San Cristóbal, Venezuela
- Height: 1.84 m (6 ft 1/2 in)
- Position: Striker

Youth career
- 2003: Cortuluá

Senior career*
Years	Team	Apps	(Gls)
2004–2011	Deportivo Táchira	89	(20)
2011–2014	Deportivo Lara	102	(30)
2015	Deportivo La Guaira	34	(3)
2016–2021	Deportivo Táchira	168	(40)

International career
2006–2012	Venezuela	11	(1)

Managerial career
- 2022–2024: Deportivo Táchira (assistant)
- 2024–2025: Deportivo Táchira
- * Club domestic league appearances and goals

Édgar Fernando Pérez Greco (born 16 February 1982) is a Venezuelan football manager and former player who played as a striker.

== International goals ==
Scores and results list Venezuela's goal tally first.

#	Date	Venue	Opponent	Score	Result	Competition
1.	25 January 2012	Reliant Stadium, Houston, United States	Mexico	1–0	1–3	Friendly
