= Estadio Olímpico Hermanos Ghersi Páez =

- Hermanos Ghersi
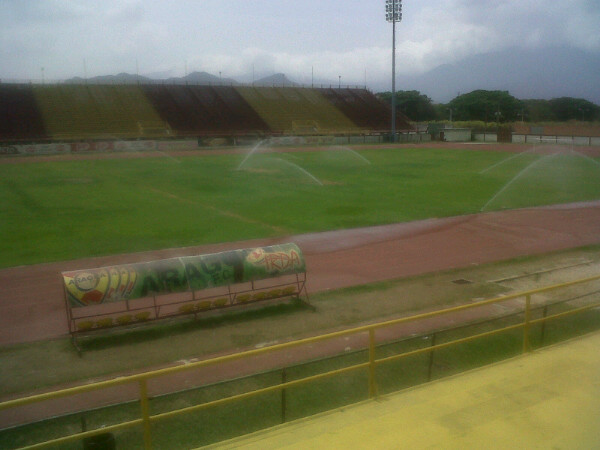
- Interactive map of Estadio Olímpico Hermanos Ghersi Páez
- Location: Maracay, Venezuela
- Coordinates: 10°15′31″N 67°36′44″W
- Owner: Girardot Municipality, Aragua
- Capacity: 14,000
- Surface: grass

Tenant
- Aragua FC

Estadio Olímpico Hermanos Ghersi Páez is a multi-use stadium in Maracay, Venezuela. It is currently used mostly for football matches and is the home stadium of Aragua Fútbol Club. The stadium holds 14,000 people.
