= Estadio Metropolitano de Cabudare =

Football stadium in Venezuela

Coordinates: 9°59′36.76″N 69°13′11.49″W

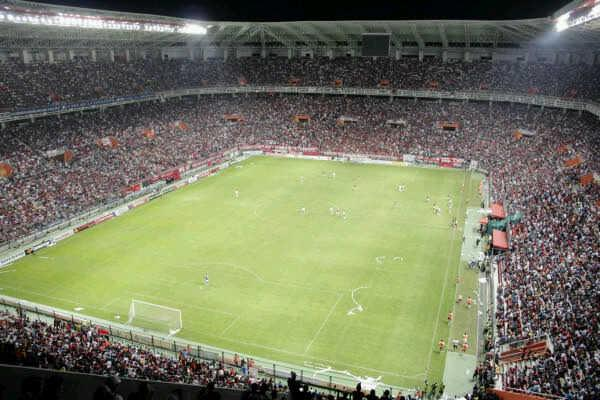
- Interactive map of Estadio Metropolitano de Cabudare
- Full name: Estadio Metropolitano de Fútbol de Lara
- Location: Cabudare, Venezuela
- Capacity: 47,913

Construction
- Built: 2005-2007
- Opened: 2007
- Cost: US$74.4 million

Tenant
- ACD Lara

The Estadio Metropolitano de Cabudare is a football stadium, located in Cabudare near the city of Barquisimeto in Lara state, in the west-central Venezuela, built between 2006 and 2009 on behalf of the Government of that country, and on the state of Lara in the Venezuelan Jantesa firm, and worked as one of the 9 venues of the 2007 Copa América, with a capacity that can reach up to 47,913 seated spectators, with 110 meters long and 70 meters wide, has grass Bermuda, has 3 parking lots with capacity for 4,000 vehicles, lifts, stage, dressing rooms for up to 4 teams, anti doping control room, dressing room for umpires, medical room and 2 big screens, press gallery, stage, VIP cabins for translation The lighting will be among the best in the country with the installation of 240 lamps (Phillips) with 2,000 watts each, suitable for television, among others. Estviera was expected to complete by the end of the first quarter of 2007. Due to delays, the stadium may definitely be inaugurated in October 2009. The field is made out of Aloha Seashore Paspalum grass and measures 110 x 70 m.

The Metropolitano de Cabudare is the only large football stadium in Venezuela with no athletics track. Therefore, the spectators are seated very close to the game action. Because of this construction, it is often compared with Old Trafford, the Manchester United Stadium in England

Lara F.C. opened Venezuela to many opportunities by playing in the Copa Libertadores in 1969. In 2005, the CONMEBOL chose the Copa América 2007 venues; in those selected Barquisimeto was not one of the venues selected. In 2006 the CONMEBOL decided to add Barquisimeto as a venue for the Copa América 2007 in honour of Lara FC.

== Copa América 2007 ==
The stadium was one of the venues for the Copa América 2007. The following games were played at the stadium during said event:

| Date | Time(EDT) | Team #1 | Res. | Team #2 | Round |
|---|---|---|---|---|---|
| 2007-07-05 | 18.35 | United States | 0-1 | Colombia | Group C |
| 2007-07-05 | 20.50 | Argentina | 1-0 | Paraguay | Group C |
| 2007-07-08 | 18.50 | Argentina | 4-0 | Peru | Quarter Final |
