= Estadio Rafael Calles Pinto =

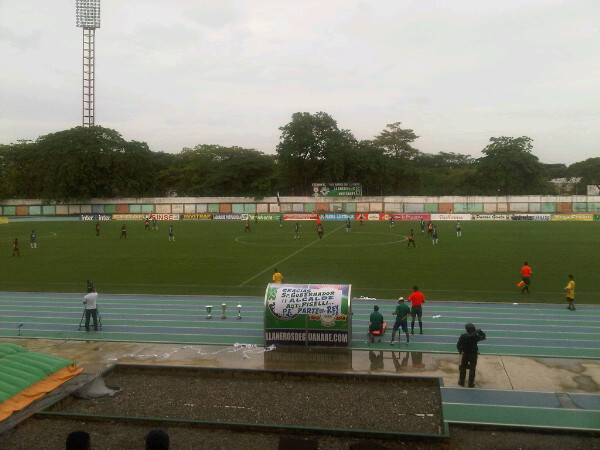
- Interactive map of Estadio Rafael Calles Pinto
- Location: Guanare, Venezuela
- Coordinates: 9°2′7″N 69°45′57″W
- Owner: Instituto Nacional de Deportes
- Capacity: 13,000
- Surface: grass

Tenant
- Llaneros de Guanare

Estadio Rafael Calles Pinto is a multi-use stadium in Guanare, Venezuela. It is mostly used for football matches and is the home stadium of Llaneros de Guanare. The stadium holds 13,000 people.
