= Estadio Agustín Tovar =

- Estadio La Carolina
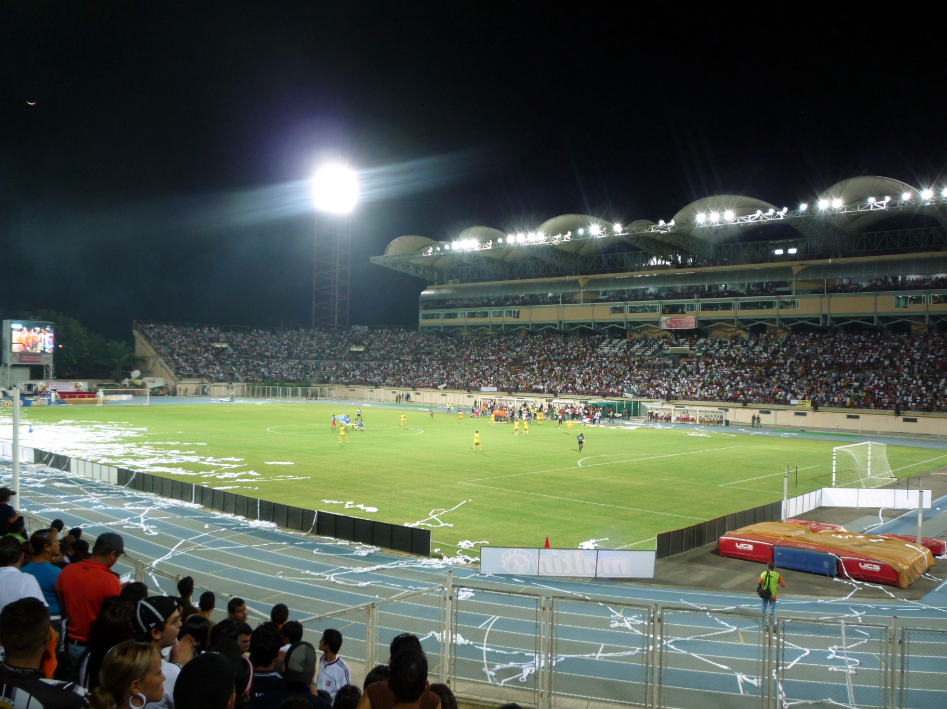
- Estadio Agustín Tovar
- Interactive map of Estadio Agustín Tovar
- Location: Barinas, Venezuela
- Coordinates: 8.62443°N 70.207401°W
- Capacity: 24,234
- Surface: grass

Construction
- Opened: June 23, 2007
- Architect: Ricardo Mazzei

Tenants
- Zamora FC; Venezuela national football team

Estadio Agustín Tovar, also known as Estadio La Carolina, is a multi-purpose stadium in Barinas, Venezuela. It is currently used mostly for football matches and it is the home stadium of Zamora FC. The stadium holds 24,234 people and was completed in 2007.

This stadium was re-built to increase its capacity from 12,000 people up to 30,000.

== Copa América 2007 ==
The stadium was one of the venues of the Copa América 2007, and held the following matches:

Date	Time (EDT)	Team #1	Res.	Team #2	Round
2007-07-02	18.30	United States	1-3	Paraguay	Group C
