= Estadio José Alberto Pérez =

Multi-use Stadium in Valera, Venezuela

- Interactive map of Estadio José Alberto Pérez
- Former names: Estadio Luis Loreto Lira
- Location: Valera, Venezuela
- Coordinates: 9°20′0.09″N 70°36′8.28″W
- Owner: Instituto Nacional de Deportes Venezuela
- Capacity: 25,000
- Surface: grass

Construction
- Opened: 1976
- Renovated: 2005

Tenants
- Trujillanos Fútbol Club; Atletico Trujillo

Estadio José Alberto Pérez (formerly known as Estadio Luis Loreto Lira) is a multi-use stadium in Valera, Venezuela. It is currently used mostly for football matches and is the home stadium of Trujillanos Fútbol Club. The stadium holds 25,000 people. It was constructed in 1976. The stadium was renovated in 2005 by the National Institute of Sports of Venezuela and the state government of Trujillo, renovating the stands, pitch and the amenities area.

== Panorama ==
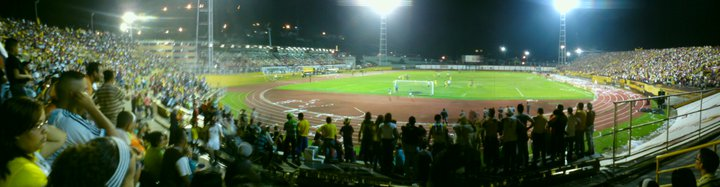
Panorama of Estadio José Alberto Pérez
