= Estadio Metropolitano de Mérida =

Football stadium in Mérida, Venezuela

Coordinates: 8°33′23″N 71°13′00″W

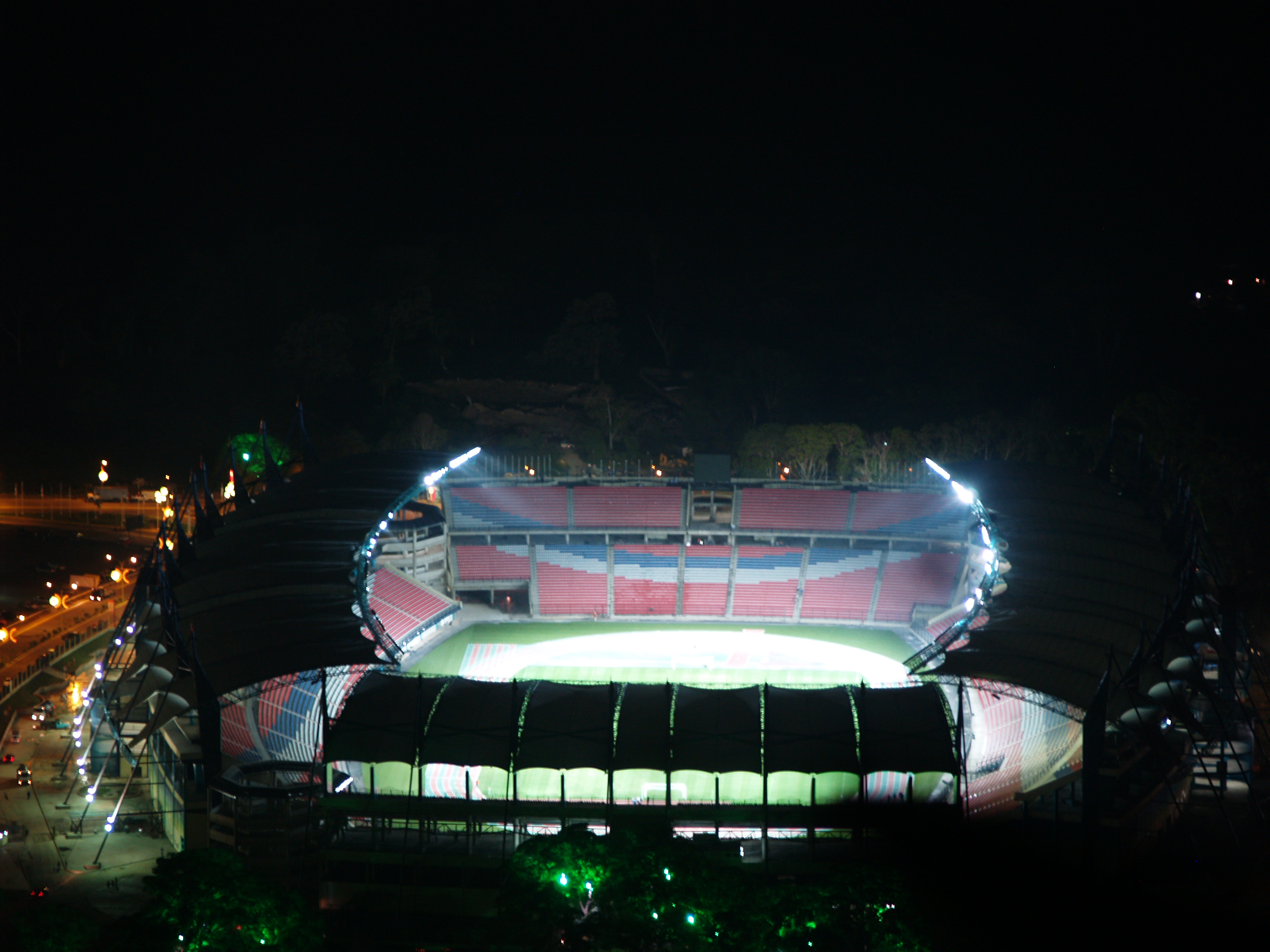
- The stadium completed, ready to host the games for the Copa America.
- Interactive map of Estadio Metropolitano de Mérida
- Full name: Estadio Olímpico Metropolitano de Mérida
- Location: Mérida, Venezuela
- Capacity: 42,200; 40,906 (international)

Construction
- Built: 2005
- Opened: 25 May 2007
- Cost: US$107 million

Tenant
- Estudiantes de Mérida FC

The Estadio Olimpico Metropolitano de Mérida or Estadio Metropolitano is a soccer stadium located in the city of Mérida in Venezuela.

It was built to be one venues of the 2007 Copa América and it would also serve as one of the venues for the National Games of Venezuela Andes 2005. The stadium is part of a major sports complex, called Cinco Águilas Blancas located in the south of the city, in a zone called Urbanizacion Hacienda.

== History ==
Its construction started in 2005 when it was decided that Mérida was going to be a subvenue for the National Venezuelan Games in that same year and for the Copa America 2007. 165 days later after construction started, the stadium was opened momentarily on December 7, 2005 for the opening of the National Games with only one seating area built, out of 4 and 2 more minor seating areas, giving the event a capacity for 16,000 people.

After the National Games finished, the stadium was temporarily closed for an inspection, then after building a big part of the stadium in so little time, the government of Mérida gave 30,000,000 bolivares to the contractors of the stadium. The government starts in January 2006 an audit to determine the costs of the stadium for the government determining that the initial cost (150,000,000 bolivares) was not enough and that it had to be raised to 230,000,000 bolivares (US$107,274,982) to finish the stadium and to be able in participate in the Copa America 2007.

== Description ==
This is the fourth largest stadium in Venezuela behind the Estadio Monumental of Maturín (52,000 persons), José Pachencho Romero of Maracaibo (46,000 persons) and the Polideportivo Cachamay in Puerto Ordaz (42,500 persons) with a capacity of 42,200, distributed in 4 stands of 50,000 m^{2}.

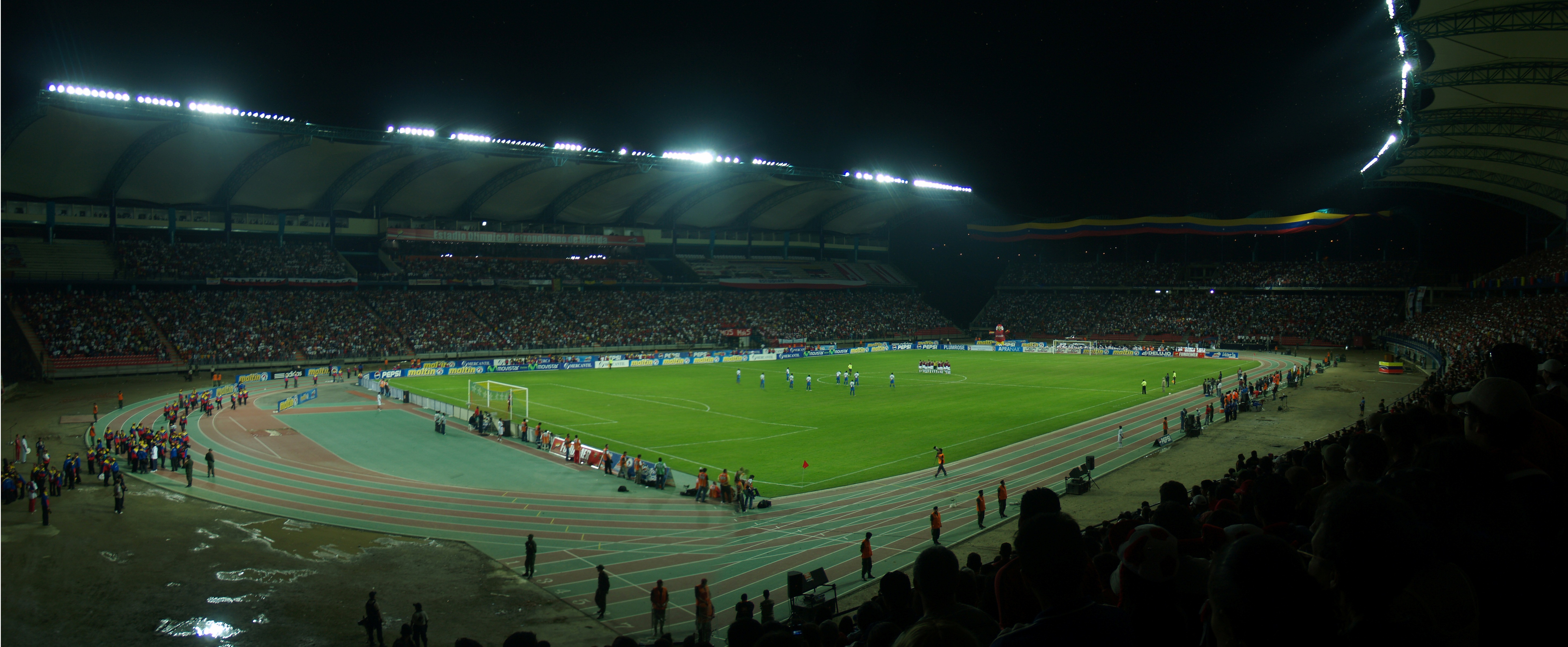
Inside the stadium.

== 2007 Copa América ==
The stadium was one of the venues for the Copa America 2007, hosting three matches from Group A of said competition.

Date	Time(EDT)	Team #1	Res.	Team #2	Round
2007-06-26	18.00	Uruguay	0-3	Peru	Group A
2007-07-03	18.30	Peru	2-2	Bolivia	Group A
2007-07-03	20.45	Venezuela	0-0	Uruguay	Group A
