= Estudiantes de Mérida F.C. =

Venezuelan football club

Estudiantes de Mérida
- Full name: Estudiantes de Mérida Fútbol Club
- Nicknames: Rojiblancos; Los Académicos
- Founded: April 4, 1971; 55 years ago
- Ground: Estadio Metropolitano de Mérida; Mérida, Venezuela
- Capacity: 42,200
- Chairman: Raúl Carreño
- Manager: Jesús Gómez
- League: Liga FUTVE
- 2025: Liga FUTVE, 12th of 14
- Website: emfc.club
Home colours	Away colours	Third colours

Estudiantes de Mérida Fútbol Club (usually called Estudiantes de Mérida, or simply Estudiantes) is a professional football club of the Venezuelan league, based in Mérida, Venezuela. It has performed well in both national and international competitions, like Copa Libertadores, and has won titles in several regional and national competitions.

== History ==
Everything began when Mérida won both Junior Championships held in this city in 1969 and 1970. This generated interest in establishing a professional football team in the city, known as a major student and tourist center of Venezuela. The late Don José Arano (of Basque origin) and Luis Ghersi Govea made the initial legal contacts with Major League Soccer authorities and the Venezuelan Football Federation (FVF). After completing the appropriate steps in Caracas, they contacted Guillermo Soto Rosa, who in turn reached out to other colleagues, including engineers Ramon Chiarelli and Gabriel Angarita. They expressed interest in the emerging project and helped promote the idea in Mérida, alongside Luis Jimenez Ron, Amadis Canizales, Daniel D 'Jesus Trejo, Eli Joseph Camacho, Fausto Ghiraldini, and others.

By then, join institutional and public efforts, the then president of the University of Los Andes, Pedro Rincón Gutiérrez and Dr. Briceno Ferrigni, then Governor of the state of Mérida, who together perform all the steps of rigor to the entities coordinating professional soccer in Venezuela. At the same time, running the works related to the improvement and expansion of the football stadium facilities most of Mérida, Guillermo Soto Rosa Stadium, located in a popular area of the city between the Santa Juana, Pie del Llano, santa Monica, Cuatricentenario and Campo de Oro. The first team's headquarters, is a modest apartment, where on April 4, 1971, meet 58 people in order to form the first Board by then stay composed by Luis A. Ron Jimenez, Amadis Canizales, Jorge Pereyra, Don José Arano, Uzcátegui Spirit, Carmelo Colella and Elio Scanu.

Membership with Antonio J. La Hoz as coach. the uniform would be a striped shirt red and white, blue pants, white socks with horizontal stripes, design inspired by the colors of the Colegio San José de Mérida, as the majority of the promoters of the team had former students of that campus. Was defined as a second uniform shirt with green and white stripes, white shorts and white socks.

The name of the institution is as Football Club Estudiantes de Mérida and the day May 17, 1971, the official request is made to the Major League Soccer for the registration of the club. The official team presentation is made on September 4, 1971, at a popular hotel in the city. Until the 12th of October of the same year at 11:00 am, appears in the programmed Guillermo Soto Rosa Stadium, the red-white currency captained by number 10 Luis Mendoza. Students counted as a godfather for release sports, Deportivo Portugues from the capital of the country, who fell 2 goals to 1, with goals scored by Uruguayan Chiazzaro José and Brazilian César Márquez.

For 1999 occupies the 5th place as the best team in South America and ranked 43 in the world. He has won two league titles (1980 and 1985), two Copa Venezuela (1971 and 1975), has been sub-national champion five times and has participated in several Copa Libertadores and Copa Conmebol, Copa Merconorte.

Later, on May 14, 2006, the team, after losing 4–2 against Deportivo Italmaracaibo, went to Second Division, after 35 years of being in the First Division. His return to the first division occurs in the month of May 2007, thanks to the expansion of First Division clubs 10–18.

== Titles ==
- Primera División Venezolana: 1980, 1985
- Copa de Venezuela: 1971, 1975

== Performance in CONMEBOL competitions ==
- Copa Libertadores: 7 appearances

1977: First Round
1978: First Round
1981: First Round
1982: First Round
1987: First Round
1999: Quarter-Finals
2003: Preliminary Round

- Copa Sudamericana: 1 appearance

2018: First stage

- Recopa Sudamericana: 0 appearances

:

- Copa CONMEBOL: 1 appearance

1999: Quarter-Finals

- Copa Merconorte: 1 appearance

2000: First Round

== Colors ==
The club's colors are red, white and blue.

== Stadium ==
The club plays their home matches at Estadio Metropolitano de Mérida, which seats 42,200 people and was inaugurated on December 7, 2005. The club previously played their home matches at Estadio Guillermo Soto Rosa, which seats 14,000 and was inaugurated on September 5, 1969.

== Current first team players ==
As of 14 March 2026

Note: Flags indicate national team as defined under FIFA eligibility rules; some limited exceptions apply. Players may hold more than one non-FIFA nationality.

No.	Pos.	Nation	Player
1	GK	VEN	Tito Rojas
2	DF	VEN	Jean Fran Gutiérrez
3	DF	VEN	Javier Marquez
4	DF	VEN	Christopher Rodríguez
5	MF	VEN	Wilken Ramírez
7	MF	VEN	Ender Albarrán
8	MF	VEN	Andrés D'Agostino
9	FW	COL	Kevin Quejada
11	MF	VEN	Andrés Montero
12	GK	PAN	Eddie Roberts
13	DF	VEN	Michael Maldonado
14	MF	PAN	Romeesh Ivey
15	MF	VEN	Cristhian Rivas

No.	Pos.	Nation	Player
16	MF	VEN	Jesús Lobo
17	FW	VEN	César Magallán
18	DF	ECU	Bryan Rivera
20	DF	VEN	José Montilla
21	FW	VEN	Angel Flores
23	MF	VEN	Yohandry Lacruz
25	DF	VEN	Héctor Acosta
26	FW	VEN	Juan Carlos Azócar
28	MF	VEN	Manuel Paez
35	FW	VEN	Elías Ajam
37	DF	VEN	Luis Vera
44	DF	ECU	Luis Caicedo

=== Out on loan ===
Note: Flags indicate national team as defined under FIFA eligibility rules; some limited exceptions apply. Players may hold more than one non-FIFA nationality.

No.	Pos.	Nation	Player
—	MF	VEN	Ander Izarra (at Atlético Morelia)

== Presidents ==
- Luis Alberto Jiménez Ron (1971–74)
- Manuel Padilla Hurtado (1974–79)
- Ramón Chiarelli Gómez (1980–81)
- Amadís Cañizales Patiño (1982–83)
- Manuel Padilla Hurtado (1983–85)
- Humberto Zambrano Román (1985–87)
- Guillermo Soto Rosa (1988–89)
- Luis Hugo Velásquez (1989–91)
- Yolanda Briceño de García (1991–94)
- Alfredo Febres Córdero (1994–96)
- Álvaro Calderón Rivas (1996–97)
- César Guillén Lamus (1997–00)
- Alcides Monsalve Cedillo (2000–03)
- Juan Carlos Lobo Serrano (2004–05)
- Jorge Segundo Cegarra (2005–07)
- Héctor Albarrán (2008–09)
- Alcides Monsalve Cedillo (2010–11)
- César Guillén Lamus (2011–13)
- Frank Castillo Salazar (2013–)

== Managers ==
- (Venezuela) Rafael Dudamel (Oct 15, 2010–Dec 15, 2013)
- (Venezuela) Manuel Plascencia (July 16, 2013–Jan 28, 2014)
- (Venezuela) Francisco "El Pacho" Moreno (201?–)
