= Aragua F.C. =

Venezuelan football club

Aragua FC
- Full name: Aragua Fútbol Club
- Nicknames: Aurirrojos (Yellow and Red); Chocolateros (Chocolatiers)
- Founded: 20 August 2002 (24 years ago)
- Ground: Estadio Olímpico Hermanos Ghersi Páez
- Capacity: 12,000
- Chairman: Luiyer Barreto
- Manager: Yoimer Segovia
- League: Segunda División
- 2024: Torneo Clausura, Western Group, 4th
- Website: http://www.araguafc.com/
Home colours	Away colours

Aragua Fútbol Club (Spanish pronunciation: [aˈɾaɣwa ˈfuðβol ˈkluβ]) is a Venezuelan football team based in the city of Maracay, in the state of Aragua. The club began their existence playing in the Venezuelan Segunda División a year after the club was founded in 2002. From 2005 to 2022, Aragua played in the Primera División Venezolana.

The club's colors are yellow and red, although they were blue and white until the mid 2000s. Home games are played at the Olímpico Hermanos Ghersi in Maracay, with a 16,000 spectator capacity.

Aragua won the 2004–05 Venezuelan Segunda División and the 2007-08 Copa Venezuela.

== History ==
For the 2002–03 season, Deportivo Galicia moved to the Estadio Olímpico Hermanos Ghersi and a new franchise named Aragua Fútbol Club was born. The team played in the Venezuelan Segunda División until the 2004–05 season, when they achieved promotion to the Venezuelan Primera División.

Aragua F.C. made their debut in Primera División with a goalless tie against Trujillanos on 5 August 2005, and remained unbeaten during the first five games of the season. Rafael Mea Vitali scored Aragua's first goal in the top flight. Aragua ended up finishing the 2005–06 season in seventh place.

At the start of the 2006–07 season, goalkeeper Renny Vega was called up by national team coach Richard Páez to represent the Venezuela national football team in a match against Colombia, making Vega the first player to receive an international call-up while playing for Aragua F.C.

In 2008, led by manager Manolo Contreras, Aragua won the Copa Venezuela and automatically qualified to participate in the 2008 edition of the Copa Sudamericana, where they were eliminated in the first round by Guadalajara. At the end of the 2007–08 season, Salomón Rondón was awarded as Youth of the Year, marking the first time that an Aragua F.C. player received the distinction.

Aragua played in Primera División until the 2022 season, in which it placed last and was relegated to Segunda División. On 3 March 2023, the club announced that it would not take part in the Segunda División season and would instead go on a one-year hiatus to solve its financial issues. On 9 March 2024, Aragua's return to the league was confirmed, joining the second tier for the 2024 season.

== Titles ==
- Venezuelan Segunda División: 1

2005

- Copa Venezuela: 1

2007

== Performance in CONMEBOL competitions ==
- Copa Sudamericana: 1 appearance

2008: First Round

== Club culture ==
=== Supporters ===
The Aragua F.C. fans are known as Los Vikingos (The Vikings), and they traditionally occupy the western stand of the stadium, known as La Popular (The Popular). They are made up of several factions that represent different cities across the state: Artillería Aurirroja (Yellow and Red Artillery), Cagua Aurirroja, Caña de Azúcar, El Limón, Turmero Aurirrojo, Santa Rita, and Santa Rosa Aurirroja. As is the case with supporter groups of other Venezuelan teams, the factions only exist in theory, and in practice all the supporters act as a unified body.

=== Rivalries ===
The club's main rival is Carabobo FC, from the neighboring state of Carabobo. The fixture is popularly known as El Clásico de la Autopista (The Highway Classic). Due to the proximity of both states' capitals, Aragua-Carabobo rivalries exist in virtually every professional sport practiced in Venezuela. The classic is currently "on hold" since Aragua was relegated to the Venezuelan Segunda División after the 2022 season.

== Notable managers ==
- (Argentina) Raúl Cavalleri
- (Venezuela) Manolo Contreras
- (Venezuela) Kike García
- (Uruguay) (Venezuela) Carlos Maldonado
- (Venezuela) Edson Rodríguez
- (Venezuela) Rafael Santana
