= Venezuela national football team results (2000–2019) =

This article details the matches played by the Venezuela national football team from 2000 to 2019.

== Fixtures and results ==
Win Draw Loss

=== 2000 ===
16 March Friendly	Venezuela	0–0	Bolivia	Maracaibo, Venezuela
		Report		Stadium: Estadio José Pachencho Romero; Attendance: 8,000

29 March 2002 FCQ	Ecuador	2–0	Venezuela	Quito, Ecuador
12:00 (UTC−5)	Delgado 18'; Aguinaga 57'	Report		Stadium: Estadio Casa Blanca; Attendance: 37,288; Referee: Eduardo Gamboa (Chile)

26 April 2002 FCQ	Venezuela	0–4	Argentina	Maracaibo, Venezuela
19:00 (UTC−4)		Report	Ayala 8'; Ortega 24', 77'; Crespo 89'	Stadium: Estadio José Pachencho Romero; Attendance: 19,355; Referee: Carlos Amarilla (Paraguay)

31 May Friendly	Venezuela	3–1	Panama	San Cristóbal, Venezuela
		Report		Stadium: Estadio Polideportivo de Pueblo Nuevo; Attendance: 3,000

4 June 2002 FCQ	Colombia	3–0	Venezuela	Bogotá, Colombia
17:45 UTC−5	Viveros 27'; Córdoba 42' (pen.); Valenciano 89'	Report		Stadium: Estadio Nemesio Camacho "El Campín"; Attendance: 20,854; Referee: Oscar Godoi (Brazil)

21 June Friendly	Panama	2–0	Venezuela	Panama City, Panama
		Report		Stadium: Estadio Rommel Fernández; Attendance: 2,500

28 June 2002 FCQ	Venezuela	4–2	Bolivia	San Cristóbal, Venezuela
19:00 (UTC−4)	Mea Vitali 24'; Morán 38'; Savarese 61'; Tortolero 68' (pen.)	Report	Moreno 49'; Baldivieso 58'	Stadium: Estadio Polideportivo de Pueblo Nuevo; Attendance: 7,000; Referee: Rogger Zambrano (Ecuador)

5 July Friendly	Mexico	2–1	Venezuela	Monterrey, Mexico
	Zepeda 42'; Abundis 50'	Report	Morán 25'	Stadium: Estadio Tecnológico; Attendance: 30,000; Referee: Benito Archundia (Mexico)

18 July 2002 FCQ	Uruguay	3–1	Venezuela	Montevideo, Uruguay
19:30 UTC−3	Olivera 28', 90+2'; Rodríguez 53'		Noriega 23'	Stadium: Estadio Centenario; Attendance: 58,000; Referee: René Ortubé (Bolivia)

25 July 2002 FCQ	Venezuela	0–2	Chile	San Cristóbal, Venezuela
20:00 (UTC−4)		Report	Tapia 70'; Zamorano 89'	Stadium: Estadio Polideportivo de Pueblo Nuevo; Attendance: 14,880; Referee: Héctor Baldassi (Argentina)

10 August Friendly	Costa Rica	1–5	Venezuela	Alajuela, Costa Rica
20:00 (UTC−6)	Robinson 14'	Report	Urdaneta 2', 25'; Rey 5'; de Ornelas 62'; Álvarez 88'	Stadium: Estadio Alejandro Morera Soto; Attendance: 6,000; Referee: Carlos Torres (Paraguay)

16 August 2002 FCQ	Peru	1–0	Venezuela	Lima, Peru
21:00 (UTC−5)	Palacios 69'	Report		Stadium: Estadio Nacional; Attendance: 41,084; Referee: Byron Moreno (Ecuador)

2 September 2002 FCQ	Paraguay	3–0	Venezuela	Asunción, Paraguay
18:00 (UTC−4)	González 30'; Cardozo 34'; Paredes 43'	Report		Stadium: Estadio Defensores del Chaco; Attendance: 40,000; Referee: Juan Paniagua (Bolivia)

8 October 2002 FCQ	Venezuela	0–6	Brazil	Maracaibo, Venezuela
15:00 (UTC−4)		Report	Euller 20'; Juninho 28'; Romário 31', 36', 38' (pen.), 63'	Stadium: Estadio José Pachencho Romero; Attendance: 6,350; Referee: Ubaldo Aquino (Paraguay)

15 November 2002 FCQ	Venezuela	1–2	Ecuador	Maracaibo, Venezuela
19:45 (UTC−4)	García 66'	Report	Kaviedes 3'; Sánchez 23'	Stadium: Estadio José Pachencho Romero; Attendance: 6,500; Referee: Eduardo Lecca (Peru)

=== 2001 ===
28 March 2002 FCQ	Argentina	5–0	Venezuela	Buenos Aires, Argentina
21:45 (UTC−3)	Crespo 13'; Sorín 31'; Verón 51'; Gallardo 60'; Samuel 85'	Report		Stadium: Estadio Monumental Antonio Vespucio Liberti; Attendance: 32,000; Referee: Gilberto Hidalgo (Peru)

19 April Friendly	Costa Rica	2–2	Venezuela	Alajuela, Costa Rica
20:00 (UTC−6)	Fonseca 35'; Díaz 82'	Report	Rondón 60'; Arias 87' (o.g.)	Stadium: Estadio Alejandro Morera Soto; Attendance: 13,000; Referee: Rónald Cedeño (Costa Rica)

24 April 2002 FCQ	Venezuela	2–2	Colombia	San Cristóbal, Venezuela
19:15 (UTC−4)	Rondón 22'; Arango 82'	Report	Bedoya 83'; Bonilla 88'	Stadium: Estadio Polideportivo de Pueblo Nuevo; Attendance: 19,000; Referee: Guido Aros (Chile)

3 June 2002 FCQ	Bolivia	5–0	Venezuela	La Paz, Bolivia
16:00 (UTC−4)	Baldivieso 32', 68'; Botero 35', 50'; Justiniano 38'	Report		Stadium: Estadio Hernando Siles; Attendance: 25,000; Referee: José Carpio (Ecuador)

11 July 2001 Copa América	Colombia	2–0	Venezuela	Barranquilla, Colombia
20:45 (UTC−5)	Grisales 15'; Aristizábal 59' (pen.)			Stadium: Estadio Metropolitano; Attendance: 50,000; Referee: René Ortube (Bolivia)

14 July 2001 Copa América	Chile	1–0	Venezuela	Barranquilla, Colombia
16:15 (UTC−5)	Montecinos 78'			Stadium: Estadio Metropolitano; Attendance: 33,000; Referee: Gilberto Alcalá (Mexico)

17 July 2001 Copa América	Ecuador	4–0	Venezuela	Barranquilla, Colombia
18:30 (UTC−5)	Delgado 19', 63'; Fernández 29'; Méndez 60'			Stadium: Estadio Metropolitano; Attendance: 20,000; Referee: Gilberto Hidalgo (Peru)

14 August 2002 FCQ	Venezuela	2–0	Uruguay	Maracaibo, Venezuela
19:00 (UTC−4)	Morán 52'; Rondón 90'			Stadium: Estadio José Pachencho Romero; Attendance: 8,500; Referee: Antonio Marrufo Mendoza (Mexico)

4 September 2002 FCQ	Chile	0–2	Venezuela	Santiago, Chile
20:00 (UTC−3)			Páez 56'; Arango 62'	Stadium: Estadio Nacional; Attendance: 30,000; Referee: René Ortubé (Bolivia)

6 October 2002 FCQ	Venezuela	3–0	Peru	San Cristóbal, Venezuela
19:30 (UTC−4)	Alvarado 54', 77'; Morán 80'			Stadium: Estadio Polideportivo de Pueblo Nuevo; Attendance: 17,220; Referee: Mario Sánchez Yanten (Chile)

8 November 2002 FCQ	Venezuela	3–1	Paraguay
19:00

14 November 2002 FCQ	Brazil	3–0	Venezuela
20:40

=== 2002 ===
3 March Friendly	Iran	1–0	Venezuela

7 May Friendly	Venezuela	0–0	Colombia

21 August Friendly	Venezuela	2–0	Bolivia

9 October Friendly	Venezuela	0–0	Ecuador

20 October Friendly	Venezuela	2–0	Ecuador

20 November Friendly	Venezuela	1–0	Uruguay

=== 2003 ===
29 March Friendly	United States	2–0	Venezuela

2 April Friendly	Venezuela	2–0	Jamaica

30 April Friendly	Venezuela	3–0	Trinidad and Tobago

7 June Friendly	Honduras	1–2	Venezuela	Miami, United States
	Velásquez 45'		Urdaneta 14'; Arango 36'	Stadium: Miami Orange Bowl; Attendance: 12,000

27 June Friendly	Peru	1–0	Venezuela

3 July Friendly	Trinidad and Tobago	2–2	Venezuela

26 July Friendly	Nigeria	1–0	Venezuela	Watford, England
	Okocha 8'	Report		Stadium: Vicarage Road; Attendance: 1,000

20 August Friendly	Venezuela	3–2	Haiti

6 September 2006 FCQ	Ecuador	2–0	Venezuela	Quito, Ecuador
16:00 UTC-5	Espinoza 5'; C. Tenorio 72'			Stadium: Estadio Olímpico Atahualpa; Attendance: 14,997; Referee: Rubén Selman (Chile)

9 September 2006 FCQ	Venezuela	0–3	Argentina	Caracas, Venezuela
19:00 UTC−4			Aimar 7'; Crespo 25'; Delgado 32'	Attendance: 24,783; Referee: Martín Vázquez (Uruguay)

15 November 2006 FCQ	Colombia	0–1	Venezuela	Barranquilla, Colombia
16:00 UTC−5			Arango 9'	Stadium: Estadio Metropolitano Roberto Meléndez; Attendance: 20,000; Referee: Carlos Chandía (Chile)

18 November 2006 FCQ	Venezuela	2–1	Bolivia	Maracaibo, Venezuela
19:00 UTC−4	Rey 90'; Arango 90+2'		Botero 60'	Stadium: Estadio José Pachencho Romero; Attendance: 30,000; Referee: Mauricio Reinoso (Ecuador)

=== 2004 ===
18 February Friendly	Venezuela	1–1	Australia	Caracas, Venezuela
	Arango 92'		Agostino 18'	Stadium: Estadio Olímpico; Attendance: 12,000; Referee: Oscar Julian Ruiz (Colombia)

10 March Friendly	Venezuela	2–1	Honduras	Maracaibo, Venezuela
18:00 VET	Vera 36' (pen.); Noriega 52'		López 39'	Stadium: Estadio José Pachencho Romero; Attendance: 15,000; Referee: Jorge Manzur (Venezuela)

31 March 2006 FCQ	Uruguay	0–3	Venezuela	Montevideo, Uruguay
19:40 UTC−3			Urdaneta 19'; H. González 67'; Arango 77'	Stadium: Estadio Centenario; Attendance: 40,094; Referee: René Ortubé (Bolivia)

28 April Friendly	Jamaica	2–1	Venezuela

1 June 2006 FCQ	Venezuela	0–1	Chile	San Cristóbal, Venezuela
19:00 UTC−4			Pinilla 83'	Stadium: Estadio Polideportivo de Pueblo Nuevo; Attendance: 23,040; Referee: Carlos Torres (Paraguay)

6 June 2006 FCQ	Peru	0–0	Venezuela	Lima, Peru
15:00 UTC−5				Stadium: Estadio Nacional; Attendance: 40,000; Referee: Jorge Larrionda (Uruguay)

6 July 2004 Copa América	Venezuela	0–1	Colombia

9 July 2004 Copa América	Peru	3–1	Venezuela

12 July 2004 Copa América	Venezuela	1–1	Bolivia

18 August Friendly	Spain	3–2	Venezuela	Las Palmas, Spain
	Morientes 40'; Tamudo 56', 66'		Rojas 45'; Castellín 90'	Stadium: Estadio Gran Canaria

5 September 2006 FCQ	Paraguay	1–0	Venezuela	Asunción, Paraguay
18:20 UTC−4	Gamarra 52'			Stadium: Estadio Defensores del Chaco; Attendance: 30,000; Referee: Gustavo Méndez (Uruguay)

9 October 2006 FCQ	Venezuela	2–5	Brazil	Maracaibo, Venezuela
21:00 UTC−4	Morán 79', 90'		Kaká 5', 34'; Ronaldo 48', 50'; Adriano 75'	Stadium: Estadio José Pachencho Romero; Attendance: 26,133; Referee: Carlos Chandía (Chile)

14 October 2006 FCQ	Venezuela	3–1	Ecuador
19:00

17 November 2006 FCQ	Argentina	3–2	Venezuela
19:00

=== 2005 ===
9 February Friendly	Venezuela	3–0	Estonia

26 March 2006 FCQ	Venezuela	0–0	Colombia
19:00

29 March 2006 FCQ	Bolivia	3–1	Venezuela
16:00

25 May Friendly	Venezuela	1–1	Panama

4 June 2006 FCQ	Venezuela	1–1	Uruguay
19:00

8 June 2006 FCQ	Chile	2–1	Venezuela
19:00

18 August Friendly	Ecuador	3–1	Venezuela

3 September 2006 FCQ	Venezuela	4–1	Peru
19:00

8 October 2006 FCQ	Venezuela	0–1	Paraguay
17:00

12 October 2006 FCQ	Brazil	3–0	Venezuela
21:30

=== 2006 ===
1 March Friendly	Venezuela	1–1	Colombia

5 May Friendly	Mexico	1–0	Venezuela

26 May Friendly	United States	2–0	Venezuela

16 August Friendly	Venezuela	0–0	Honduras	Maracay, Venezuela
				Stadium: Estadio Olímpico Hermanos Ghersi Páez; Attendance: 9,000

2 September Friendly	Switzerland	1–0	Venezuela

6 September Friendly	Austria	0–1	Venezuela

27 September Friendly	Venezuela	1–0	Uruguay

18 October Friendly	Uruguay	4–0	Venezuela

15 November Friendly	Venezuela	2–1	Guatemala

=== 2007 ===
14 January Friendly	Venezuela	2–0	Sweden

7 February Friendly	Venezuela	0–1	Chile

1 March Friendly	Mexico	3–1	Venezuela

24 March Friendly	Venezuela	3–1	Cuba

29 March Friendly	Venezuela	5–0	New Zealand

25 May Friendly	Venezuela	2–1	Honduras	Mérida, Venezuela
	Vielma 18'; Arismendi 39'		Pavón 45'	Stadium: Estadio Metropolitano de Mérida; Attendance: 42,000; Referee: Maiker Gómez (Venezuela)

1 June Friendly	Venezuela	2–2	Canada

26 June 2007 Copa América	Venezuela	2–2	Bolivia
20:50

30 June 2007 Copa América	Venezuela	2–0	Peru
18:20

3 July 2007 Copa América	Venezuela	0–0	Uruguay
20:50

7 July 2007 Copa América	Venezuela	1–4	Uruguay
18:05

22 August Friendly	Paraguay	1–1	Venezuela

8 September Friendly	Venezuela	3–2	Paraguay

12 September Friendly	Venezuela	1–1	Panama

13 October 2010 FCQ	Ecuador	0–1	Venezuela
17:50

16 October 2010 FCQ	Venezuela	0–2	Argentina
20:40

17 November 2010 FCQ	Colombia	1–0	Venezuela
16:10

20 November 2010 FCQ	Venezuela	5–3	Bolivia
18:40

=== 2008 ===
4 February Friendly	Venezuela	1–0	Haiti

6 February Friendly	Venezuela	1–1	Haiti

23 March Friendly	Venezuela	1–0	El Salvador

26 March Friendly	Venezuela	0–1	Bolivia

30 April Friendly	Colombia	5–2	Venezuela

30 May Friendly	Venezuela	1–1	Honduras

6 June Friendly	Brazil	0–2	Venezuela

9 June Friendly	Netherlands Antilles	0–1	Venezuela

14 June 2010 FCQ	Uruguay	1–1	Venezuela
16:00

19 June 2010 FCQ	Venezuela	2–3	Chile
20:00

20 August Friendly	Venezuela	4–1	Syria

6 September 2010 FCQ	Peru	1–0	Venezuela
20:30

9 September 2010 FCQ	Paraguay	2–0	Venezuela
20:00

12 October 2010 FCQ	Venezuela	0–4	Brazil
15:30

15 October 2010 FCQ	Venezuela	3–1	Ecuador
20:30

19 November Friendly	Venezuela	0–0	Angola

=== 2009 ===
11 February Friendly	Venezuela	2–1	Guatemala

28 March 2010 FCQ	Argentina	4–0	Venezuela	Buenos Aires, Argentina
19:15 UTC−3	Messi 26'; Tevez 47'; Rodríguez 51'; Agüero 73'			Stadium: Estadio Monumental Antonio Vespucio Liberti; Attendance: 46,085; Referee: Victor Hugo Rivera (Peru)

31 March 2010 FCQ	Venezuela	2–0	Colombia	Ciudad Guayana, Venezuela
20:00	Miku 78'; Arango 82'			Stadium: Estadio Polideportivo Cachamay; Attendance: 35,000; Referee: Pablo Pozo (Chile)

13 May Friendly	Venezuela	1–1	Costa Rica	San Cristóbal, Venezuela
20:00 UTC−4:30	Velázquez 24'		W. Granados 28'	Stadium: Estadio Polideportivo de Pueblo Nuevo; Referee: Marlon Escalante (Venezuela)

6 June 2010 FCQ	Bolivia	0–1	Venezuela	La Paz, Bolivia
16:50 (UTC−4)			Rivero 33' (o.g.)	Stadium: Estadio Hernando Siles; Attendance: 23,427; Referee: Carlos Vera (Ecuador)

10 June 2010 FCQ	Venezuela	2–2	Uruguay	Ciudad Guayana, Venezuela
20:30 UTC−4:30	Maldonado 9'; Rey 74'		Suárez 60'; Forlán 72'	Stadium: Estadio Polideportivo Cachamay; Attendance: 37,000; Referee: Sálvio Fagundes (Brazil)

24 June Friendly	Mexico	4–0	Venezuela

27 June Friendly	Costa Rica	1–0	Venezuela

12 August Friendly	Colombia	1–2	Venezuela

5 September 2010 FCQ	Chile	2–2	Venezuela	Santiago, Chile
21:30 (UTC−4)	Vidal 11'; Millar 53'		Maldonado 34'; Rey 45+1'	Stadium: Estadio Monumental David Arellano; Attendance: 44,000; Referee: René Ortubé (Bolivia)

9 September 2010 FCQ	Venezuela	3–1	Peru	Puerto la Cruz, Venezuela
20:30 UTC−4:30	Miku 33', 52'; Vargas 65'		Fuenmayor 41' (o.g.)	Stadium: Estadio José Antonio Anzoátegui; Attendance: 31,703; Referee: Carlos Vera (Ecuador)

10 October 2010 FCQ	Venezuela	1–2	Paraguay
17:30

14 October 2010 FCQ	Brazil	0–0	Venezuela
18:00

=== 2010 ===
2 February Friendly	Japan	0–0	Venezuela

3 March Friendly	Venezuela	1–2	Panama

6 March Friendly	Venezuela	2–1	North Korea

31 March Friendly	Chile	0–0	Venezuela

21 April Friendly	Honduras	1–2	Venezuela

20 May Friendly	Aruba	0–3	Venezuela

29 May Friendly	Venezuela	0–0	Canada

11 August Friendly	Panama	0–0	Venezuela

3 September Friendly	Venezuela	0–2	Colombia

7 September Friendly	Venezuela	1–0	Ecuador

7 October Friendly	Bolivia	1–3	Venezuela	Estadio Ramón Tahuichi Aguilera, Santa Cruz de la Sierra
				Referee: Ibrahim Chaibou (Niger)

12 October Friendly	Mexico	2–2	Venezuela

17 November Friendly	Ecuador	4–1	Venezuela
				Referee: Ibrahim Chaibou (Niger)

=== 2011 ===
9 February Friendly	Venezuela	2–2	Costa Rica	Puerto la Cruz, Venezuela
18:30 (UTC−4)	Rondón 24', 80'		Oviedo 6'; Ureña 59'	Stadium: Estadio Olímpico José Antonio Anzoátegui; Referee: Henry Gambetta (Peru)

16 March Friendly	Argentina	4–1	Venezuela	San Juan, Argentina
	Chávez 20'; Mouche 35', 53'; Aued 75'	Report	Arismendi 29'	Stadium: Estadio San Juan del Bicentenario; Attendance: 25,000; Referee: Claudio Puga (Chile)

25 March Friendly	Jamaica	0–2	Venezuela	Montego Bay, Jamaica
		Report	Fedor 64'; Moreno 67'	Stadium: Catherine Hall Sports Complex; Attendance: 6,000; Referee: Enrico Wijngaarde (Suriname)

29 March Friendly	Mexico	1–1	Venezuela	San Diego, California
				Stadium: Qualcomm Stadium; Referee: Ricardo Salazar (United States)

1 June Friendly	Guatemala	0–2	Venezuela

7 June Friendly	Venezuela	0–3	Spain	Puerto la Cruz, Venezuela
16:00 UTC−4:30		Report	Villa 5'; Pedro 20'; Alonso 45'	Stadium: Luis Ramos; Attendance: 36,000; Referee: Georges Buckley (Peru)

3 July 2011 Copa América	Brazil	0–0	Venezuela	La Plata, Argentina
16:00 UTC−3		Report		Stadium: Estadio Ciudad de La Plata; Referee: Raúl Orosco (Bolivia)

9 July 2011 Copa América	Venezuela	1–0	Ecuador	Salta, Argentina
18:30 UTC−3	C. González 61'	Report		Stadium: Estadio Padre Ernesto Martearena; Referee: Wálter Quesada (Costa Rica)

13 July 2011 Copa América	Paraguay	3–3	Venezuela	Salta, Argentina
19:15 UTC−3	Alcaraz 32'; Barrios 62'; Riveros 85'	Report	Rondón 4'; Miku 89'; Perozo 90+2'	Stadium: Estadio Padre Ernesto Martearena; Referee: Enrique Osses (Chile)

17 July 2011 Copa América	Chile	1–2	Venezuela	San Juan, Argentina
19:15 UTC−3	Suazo 69'	Report	Vizcarrondo 34'; Cichero 80'	Stadium: Estadio del Bicentenario; Attendance: 23,000; Referee: Carlos Vera (Ecuador)

20 July 2011 Copa América	Paraguay	0–0 (5–3 p)	Venezuela	Mendoza, Argentina
21:45 UTC−3				Stadium: Estadio Malvinas Argentinas; Attendance: 8,000; Referee: Francisco Chacón (Mexico)
	Penalties
	Ortigoza (penalty scored); Barrios (penalty scored); Riveros (penalty scored); Martínez (penalty scored); Verón (penalty scored)		(penalty scored) Maldonado; (penalty scored) Rey; (penalty missed) Lucena; (penalty scored) Miku

23 July 2011 Copa América	Peru	4–1	Venezuela	La Plata, Argentina
16:00 UTC−3	Chiroque 41'; Guerrero 63', 89', 90+2'		Arango 77'	Stadium: Estadio Ciudad de La Plata; Attendance: 20,000; Referee: Wilmar Roldán (Colombia)

7 August Friendly	El Salvador	2–1	Venezuela

10 August Friendly	Honduras	2–0	Venezuela

2 September Friendly	Venezuela	0–1	Argentina

6 September Friendly	Venezuela	2–1	Guinea

7 October 2014 FCQ	Ecuador	2–0	Venezuela	Quito, Ecuador
16:05 (UTC−5)	J. Ayoví 15'; C. Benítez 28'	Report		Stadium: Estadio Olímpico Atahualpa; Attendance: 32,278; Referee: Enrique Osses (Chile)

11 October 2014 FCQ	Venezuela	1–0	Argentina	Puerto La Cruz, Venezuela
20:20 UTC−4:30	Amorebieta 62'	Report		Stadium: Estadio José Antonio Anzoátegui; Attendance: 35,600; Referee: Roberto Silvera (Uruguay)

11 November 2014 FCQ	Colombia	1–1	Venezuela	Barranquilla, Colombia
19:00 (UTC−5)	Guarín 11'	Report	F. Feltscher 78'	Stadium: Estadio Metropolitano Roberto Meléndez; Attendance: 43,953; Referee: Omar Ponce (Ecuador)

15 November 2014 FCQ	Venezuela	1–0	Bolivia	San Cristóbal, Venezuela
20:30 UTC−4:30	Vizcarrondo 25'	Report		Stadium: Estadio Polideportivo de Pueblo Nuevo; Attendance: 33,351; Referee: Georges Buckley (Peru)

22 December Friendly	Venezuela	0–2	Costa Rica	Barquisimeto, Venezuela
17:35 UTC−4			Wallace 41'; Cubero 53'	Stadium: Estadio Metropolitano de Fútbol de Lara; Attendance: 35,000; Referee: Rudolph Angela (Aruba)

=== 2012 ===
21 January Friendly	United States	1–0	Venezuela

25 January Friendly	Mexico	3–1	Venezuela

29 February Friendly	Spain	5–0	Venezuela
		Report

23 May Friendly	Venezuela	4–0	Moldova	Ciudad Guayana, Venezuela
19:30	Seijas 45'; Rondón 50', 73'; Vizcarrondo 55'	Report		Stadium: Polideportivo Cachamay; Attendance: 20,000; Referee: Henry Gambetta (Peru)

2 June 2014 FCQ	Uruguay	1–1	Venezuela	Montevideo, Uruguay
15:00 UTC−3	Forlán 38'	Report	Rondón 84'	Stadium: Estadio Centenario; Attendance: 57,000; Referee: Antonio Arias (Paraguay)

9 June 2014 FCQ	Venezuela	0–2	Chile	Puerto La Cruz, Venezuela
18:05 UTC−4:30		Report	Fernández 85'; Aránguiz 90+1'	Stadium: Estadio José Antonio Anzoátegui; Attendance: 35,000; Referee: Hernando Buitrago (Colombia)

15 August Friendly	Japan	1–1	Venezuela

7 September 2014 FCQ	Peru	2–1	Venezuela	Lima, Peru
20:25 (UTC−5)	Farfán 47', 59'	Report	Arango 42'	Stadium: Estadio Nacional; Attendance: 54,998; Referee: Martín Vázquez (Uruguay)

11 September 2014 FCQ	Paraguay	0–2	Venezuela	Asunción, Paraguay
19:25 (UTC−4)		Report	Rondón 45', 67'	Stadium: Estadio Defensores del Chaco; Attendance: 13,680; Referee: Enrique Osses (Chile)

16 October 2014 FCQ	Venezuela	1–1	Ecuador	Puerto La Cruz, Venezuela
17:30 UTC−4:30	Arango 5'	Report	Castillo 23'	Stadium: Estadio José Antonio Anzoátegui; Attendance: 35,076; Referee: Néstor Pitana (Argentina)

14 November Friendly	Venezuela	1–3	Nigeria

=== 2013 ===
22 March 2014 FCQ	Argentina	3–0	Venezuela
21:00		Report

26 March 2014 FCQ	Venezuela	1–0	Colombia
19:30		Report

7 June 2014 FCQ	Bolivia	1–1	Venezuela
16:00		Report

11 June 2014 FCQ	Venezuela	0–1	Uruguay
19:30		Report

14 August Friendly	Venezuela	2–2	Bolivia

6 September 2014 FCQ	Chile	3–0	Venezuela
20:30		Report

10 September 2014 FCQ	Venezuela	3–2	Peru
19:25		Report

11 October 2014 FCQ	Venezuela	1–1	Paraguay
16:30		Report

=== 2014 ===
5 March Friendly	Honduras	2–1	Venezuela

5 September Friendly	South Korea	3–1	Venezuela

9 September Friendly	Japan	3–0	Venezuela

14 November Friendly	Chile	5–0	Venezuela

18 November Friendly	Bolivia	3–2	Venezuela

=== 2015 ===
4 February Friendly	Honduras	2–3	Venezuela	San Pedro Sula, Honduras
18:30 CST	Lozano 80'; Montes 90'		Blanco 21'; Figuera 50'; Farías 76'	Stadium: Estadio Olímpico Metropolitano; Attendance: 40,000; Referee: Joel Aguilar (El Salvador)

11 February Friendly	Venezuela	2–1	Honduras	Barinas, Venezuela
19:00 VET	Lucena 17'; Murillo 57'		Lozano 14'	Stadium: Estadio Agustín Tovar; Attendance: 25,000; Referee: Diego Haro (Peru)

27 March Friendly	Jamaica	2–1	Venezuela

31 March Friendly	Peru	0–1	Venezuela

14 June 2015 Copa América	Colombia	0–1	Venezuela	Rancagua, Chile
16:00		Report	Rondón 59'	Stadium: Estadio El Teniente; Attendance: 12,387; Referee: Andrés Cunha (Uruguay)

18 June 2015 Copa América	Peru	1–0	Venezuela	Valparaíso, Chile
20:30	Pizarro 71'	Report		Stadium: Estadio Elías Figueroa; Attendance: 15,542; Referee: Raúl Orosco (Bolivia)

21 June 2015 Copa América	Brazil	2–1	Venezuela	Santiago, Chile
18:30	Thiago Silva 8'; Firmino 51'	Report	Miku 84'	Stadium: Estadio Monumental David Arellano; Attendance: 33,284; Referee: Enrique Cáceres (Paraguay)

8 October 2018 FCQ	Venezuela	0–1	Paraguay
16:30

13 October 2018 FCQ	Brazil	3–1	Venezuela
22:00

12 November 2018 FCQ	Bolivia	4–2	Venezuela
16:00

17 November 2018 FCQ	Venezuela	1–3	Ecuador
16:30

=== 2016 ===
24 March 2018 FCQ	Peru	2–2	Venezuela
21:15

29 March 2018 FCQ	Venezuela	1–4	Chile
19:00

5 June Copa América Centenario	Jamaica	0–1	Venezuela
17:00

9 June Copa América Centenario	Uruguay	0–1	Venezuela
19:30

13 June Copa América Centenario	Mexico	1–1	Venezuela
20:00

18 June Copa América Centenario	Argentina	4–1	Venezuela
19:00

1 September 2018 FCQ	Colombia	2–0	Venezuela
15:30

6 September 2018 FCQ	Venezuela	2–2	Argentina
19:30

6 October 2018 FCQ	Uruguay	3–0	Venezuela
20:00

11 October 2018 FCQ	Venezuela	0–2	Brazil
20:30

10 November 2018 FCQ	Venezuela	5–0	Bolivia
19:45

15 November 2018 FCQ	Ecuador	3–0	Venezuela
16:00

=== 2017 ===
23 March 2018 FCQ	Venezuela	2–2	Peru	Maturín, Venezuela
19:30	Villanueva 23'; Otero 39'	Report (FIFA); Report (CONMEBOL)	Carrillo 46'; Guerrero 64'	Stadium: Estadio Monumental de Maturín; Attendance: 35,920; Referee: Enrique Cáceres (Paraguay)

28 March 2018 FCQ	Chile	3–1	Venezuela	Santiago, Chile
19:00	Sánchez 4'; Paredes 6', 22'	Report (FIFA); Report (CONMEBOL)	S. Rondón 62'	Stadium: Estadio Monumental David Arellano; Attendance: 34,136; Referee: Andrés Cunha (Uruguay)

3 June Friendly	United States	1–1	Venezuela	Sandy, United States
22:00 ET	Pulisic 61'		Velázquez 29'	Stadium: Rio Tinto Stadium; Attendance: 17,315; Referee: Jeffrey Solis (Costa Rica)

31 August 2018 FCQ	Venezuela	0–0	Colombia	San Cristóbal, Venezuela
17:00		Report (FIFA); Report (CONMEBOL)		Stadium: Estadio Polideportivo de Pueblo Nuevo; Attendance: 38,479; Referee: Wilton Sampaio (Brazil)

5 September 2018 FCQ	Argentina	1–1	Venezuela	Buenos Aires, Argentina
20:30	Feltscher 54' (o.g.)	Report (FIFA); Report (CONMEBOL)	Murillo 51'	Stadium: Estadio Monumental Antonio Vespucio Liberti; Attendance: 60,000; Referee: Roberto Tobar (Chile)

5 October 2018 FCQ	Venezuela	0–0	Uruguay	San Cristóbal, Venezuela
17:00		Report (FIFA); Report (CONMEBOL)		Stadium: Estadio Polideportivo de Pueblo Nuevo; Attendance: 32,100; Referee: Anderson Daronco (Brazil)

10 October 2018 FCQ	Paraguay	0–1	Venezuela	Asunción, Paraguay
20:30		Report (FIFA); Report (CONMEBOL)	Herrera 84'	Stadium: Estadio Defensores del Chaco; Attendance: 38,786; Referee: Wilton Sampaio (Brazil)

=== 2018 ===
7 September Friendly	Venezuela	1–2	Colombia	Miami Gardens, United States
20:00 (UTC−5)	Machís 4'	Report	Falcao 55'; Chará 90'	Stadium: Hard Rock Stadium; Attendance: 34,048; Referee: Henry Bejarano (Costa Rica)

11 September Friendly	Panama	0–2	Venezuela	Panama City, Panama
21:00 (UTC−5)		Report	Rondón 67', 90+3'	Stadium: Estadio Rommel Fernández; Attendance: 20,000; Referee: Oshane Nation (Jamaica)

16 October Friendly	United Arab Emirates	0–2	Venezuela	Barcelona, Spain
17:00 UTC+2		Report	Mago 1'; Ponce 47'	Stadium: Estadi Olímpic Lluís Companys; Attendance: 300; Referee: Carlos Taborda Xistra (Portugal)

16 November Friendly	Japan	1–1	Venezuela	Ōita, Japan
19:30 (UTC+9)	Sakai 40'	Report	Rincón 81' (pen.)	Stadium: Ōita Bank Dome; Attendance: 33,369; Referee: Ravshan Irmatov (Uzbekistan)

20 November Friendly	Iran	1–1	Venezuela	Doha, Qatar
19:30 (UTC+9)	Gholizadeh 42'	Report	Machís 35'	Stadium: Hamad bin Khalifa Stadium; Attendance: 750; Referee: Abdulrahman Al-Jassim (Qatar)

=== 2019 ===
22 March Friendly	Argentina	1–3	Venezuela	Madrid, Spain
21:00 CET (UTC+1)	Martínez 59'	Report	Rondón 6'; Murillo 44'; Martínez 75' (pen.)	Stadium: Wanda Metropolitano; Referee: José María Sánchez Martínez (Spain)

1 June Friendly	Venezuela	1–1	Ecuador	Miami Gardens, United States
21:30 (UTC−4)	Rosales 38' (pen.)	Report	Valencia 90+1'	Stadium: Hard Rock Stadium; Attendance: 12,021; Referee: Keylor Herrera (Costa Rica)

5 June Friendly	Mexico	3–1	Venezuela	Atlanta, United States
20:00 (UTC−5)	Alvarado 32'; Pizarro 54'; Guardado 76'	Report	Murillo 18'	Stadium: Mercedes Benz Stadium; Referee: Ted Unkel (United States)

9 June Friendly	United States	0–3	Venezuela	Cincinnati, United States
14:00 (UTC−4)		Report	Rondón 16', 36'; Savarino 30'	Stadium: Nippert Stadium; Attendance: 23,955; Referee: Bryan López (Guatemala)

15 June 2019 Copa América	Venezuela	0–0	Peru	Porto Alegre, Brazil
16:00 (UTC−3)		Report		Stadium: Arena do Grêmio; Attendance: 13,370; Referee: Wilmar Roldán (Colombia)

18 June 2019 Copa América	Brazil	0–0	Venezuela	Salvador, Brazil
21:30 (UTC−3)		Report		Stadium: Itaipava Arena Fonte Nova; Attendance: 42,587; Referee: Julio Bascuñán (Chile)

22 June 2019 Copa América	Bolivia	1–3	Venezuela	Belo Horizonte, Brazil
16:00 (UTC−3)	Justiniano 82'	Report	Machís 2', 55'; Martínez 86'	Stadium: Estádio Mineirão; Attendance: 8,091; Referee: Esteban Ostojich (Uruguay)

28 June 2019 Copa América	Venezuela	0–2	Argentina	Rio de Janeiro, Brazil
16:00 (UTC−3)		Report	Martínez 10'; Lo Celso 74'	Stadium: Estádio do Maracanã; Attendance: 50,094; Referee: Wilmar Roldán (Colombia)

10 September Friendly	Colombia	0–0	Venezuela	Tampa, United States
20:30 (UTC–5)		Report		Stadium: Raymond James Stadium; Referee: Ted Unkel (United States)

10 October Friendly	Venezuela	4–1	Bolivia	Caracas, Venezuela
18:00 (UTC–4)	Herrera 38'; Machís 41'; Rondón 50', 87' (pen.)	Report	Álvarez 55'	Stadium: Estadio Olímpico de la UCV; Attendance: 20,112; Referee: Gustavo Murillo (Colombia)

14 October Friendly	Venezuela	2–0	Trinidad and Tobago	Caracas, Venezuela
18:00 (UTC–4)	Rondón 11'; Machís 14'	Report		Stadium: Estadio Olímpico de la UCV; Referee: Gustavo Murillo (Colombia)

19 November Friendly	Japan	1–4	Venezuela	Suita, Japan
19:25 (UTC+9)	Yamaguchi 70'	Report	Rondón 8', 31', 34'; Soteldo 38'	Stadium: Panasonic Stadium Suita; Attendance: 33,399; Referee: Mohd Amirul Izwan Yaacob (Malaysia)
