= 2002 FIFA World Cup qualification (CONMEBOL) =

Tournament details
- Dates: 28 March 2000 – 25 November 2001
- Teams: 10 (from 1 confederation)

Tournament statistics
- Matches played: 90
- Goals scored: 232 (2.58 per match)
- Attendance: 3,431,386 (38,127 per match)
- Top scorer(s): (Argentina) Hernán Crespo (Ecuador) Agustín Delgado (9 goals each)

Listed below are the dates and results for the 2002 FIFA World Cup qualification rounds for the South American zone (CONMEBOL). For an overview of the qualification rounds, see the article 2002 FIFA World Cup qualification.

A total of 10 CONMEBOL teams entered the competition. The South American zone was allocated 4.5 places (out of 32) in the final tournament.

The 10 teams played against each other on a home-and-away basis. The top 4 teams qualified. The 5th-placed team advanced to the CONMEBOL / OFC Intercontinental Play-off.

== Standings ==
Pos	Team	Pld	W	D	L	GF	GA	GD	Pts	Qualification	Argentina national football team	Ecuador national football team	Brazil national football team	Paraguay national football team	Uruguay national football team	Colombia national football team	Bolivia national football team	Peru national football team	Venezuela national football team	Chile national football team
1	Argentina	18	13	4	1	42	15	+27	43	2002 FIFA World Cup	—	2–0	2–1	1–1	2–1	3–0	1–0	2–0	5–0	4–1
2	Ecuador	18	9	4	5	23	20	+3	31	2002 FIFA World Cup	0–2	—	1–0	2–1	1–1	0–0	2–0	2–1	2–0	1–0
3	Brazil	18	9	3	6	31	17	+14	30	2002 FIFA World Cup	3–1	3–2	—	2–0	1–1	1–0	5–0	1–1	3–0	2–0
4	Paraguay	18	9	3	6	29	23	+6	30	2002 FIFA World Cup	2–2	3–1	2–1	—	1–0	0–4	5–1	5–1	3–0	1–0
5	Uruguay	18	7	6	5	19	13	+6	27	Inter-confederation play-offs	1–1	4–0	1–0	0–1	—	1–1	1–0	0–0	3–1	2–1
6	Colombia	18	7	6	5	20	15	+5	27		1–3	0–0	0–0	0–2	1–0	—	2–0	0–1	3–0	3–1
7	Bolivia	18	4	6	8	21	33	−12	18		3–3	1–5	3–1	0–0	0–0	1–1	—	1–0	5–0	1–0
8	Peru	18	4	4	10	14	25	−11	16		1–2	1–2	0–1	2–0	0–2	0–1	1–1	—	1–0	3–1
9	Venezuela	18	5	1	12	18	44	−26	16		0–4	1–2	0–6	3–1	2–0	2–2	4–2	3–0	—	0–2
10	Chile	18	3	3	12	15	27	−12	12		0–2	0–0	3–0	3–1	0–1	0–1	2–2	1–1	0–2	—

== Matches ==
=== Matchday 1 ===
28 March 2000
21:00 UTC−5

Colombia	0–0	Brazil
	(Report)

Estadio Nemesio Camacho "El Campín", Bogotá
Attendance: 42,000
Referee: Gustavo Méndez (Uruguay)

29 March 2000
12:00 UTC−5

Ecuador	2–0	Venezuela
Delgado 18'; Aguinaga 57'	(Report)

Estadio Casa Blanca, Quito
Attendance: 37,288
Referee: Eduardo Gamboa (Chile)

29 March 2000
19:30 UTC−3

Uruguay	1–0	Bolivia
García 26'	(Report)

Estadio Centenario, Montevideo
Attendance: 49,811
Referee: Antonio Pereira da Silva (Brazil)

29 March 2000
21:45 UTC−5

Peru	2–0	Paraguay
Solano 55' (pen.); Palacios 60'	(Report)

Estadio Nacional, Lima
Attendance: 45,042
Referee: Horacio Elizondo (Argentina)

29 March 2000
21:30 UTC−3

Argentina	4–1	Chile
Batistuta 9'; Verón 33', 71' (pen.); C. López 87'	(Report)	Tello 29'

Estadio Monumental Antonio Vespucio Liberti, Buenos Aires
Attendance: 46,374
Referee: Byron Moreno (Ecuador)

=== Matchday 2 ===
26 April 2000
12:00 UTC−4

Bolivia	1–1	Colombia
Sánchez 16'	(Report)	Castillo 32'

Estadio Hernando Siles, La Paz
Attendance: 35,500
Referee: José Arana (Peru)

26 April 2000
19:00 UTC−4

Venezuela	0–4	Argentina
	(Report)	Ayala 8'; Ortega 24', 77'; Crespo 89'

Estadio José Pachencho Romero, Maracaibo
Attendance: 19,355
Referee: Carlos Amarilla (Paraguay)

26 April 2000
19:00 UTC−4

Paraguay	1–0	Uruguay
Ayala 35'	(Report)

Estadio Defensores del Chaco, Asunción
Attendance: 18,350
Referee: Ángel Sánchez (Argentina)

26 April 2000
21:00 UTC−4

Chile	1–1	Peru
Margas 42'	(Report)	Jayo 38'

Estadio Nacional, Santiago
Attendance: 44,979
Referee: Epifanio González (Paraguay)

26 April 2000
21:50 UTC−3

Brazil	3–2	Ecuador
Rivaldo 18', 51'; Zago 43'	(Report)	Aguinaga 12'; De la Cruz 75'

Estádio do Morumbi, São Paulo
Attendance: 64,738
Referee: Henry Cervantes (Colombia)

=== Matchday 3 ===
3 June 2000
17:00 UTC−3

Uruguay	2–1	Chile
Silva 35'; Montero 42'	(Report)	Zamorano 39' (pen.)

Estadio Centenario, Montevideo
Attendance: 60,000
Referee: Robert Troxler Ayala (Paraguay)

3 June 2000
18:15 UTC−4

Paraguay	3–1	Ecuador
Toledo 10'; Brizuela 42', 63'	(Report)	Graziani 87'

Estadio Defensores del Chaco, Asunción
Attendance: 22,000
Referee: Gustavo Gallesio Greco (Uruguay)

4 June 2000
15:00 UTC−3

Argentina	1–0	Bolivia
G. López 83'	(Report)

Estadio Monumental Antonio Vespucio Liberti, Buenos Aires
Attendance: 50,669
Referee: Márcio Rezende de Freitas (Brazil)

4 June 2000
15:15 UTC−5

Peru	0–1	Brazil
	(Report)	Zago 34'

Estadio Nacional, Lima
Attendance: 45,000
Referee: Daniel Giménez (Argentina)

4 June 2000
17:45 UTC−5

Colombia	3–0	Venezuela
Viveros 27'; Córdoba 42' (pen.); Valenciano 89'	(Report)

Estadio Nemesio Camacho "El Campín", Bogotá
Attendance: 20,854
Referee: Oscar Godoi (Brazil)

=== Matchday 4 ===
28 June 2000
19:00 UTC−4

Venezuela	4–2	Bolivia
Mea Vitali 24'; Morán 38'; Savarese 61'; Tortolero 68' (pen.)	(Report)	Moreno 49'; Baldivieso 58'

Estadio Polideportivo de Pueblo Nuevo, San Cristóbal
Attendance: 7,000
Referee: Rogger Zambrano (Ecuador)

28 June 2000
21:45 UTC−3

Brazil	1–1	Uruguay
Rivaldo 85' (pen.)	(Report)	Silva 5'

Estádio do Maracanã, Rio de Janeiro
Attendance: 50,000
Referee: Óscar Ruiz (Colombia)

29 June 2000
16:00 UTC−5

Ecuador	2–1	Peru
Chalá 14'; Hurtado 51'	(Report)	Pajuelo 73'

Estadio Olímpico Atahualpa, Quito
Attendance: 40,167
Referee: Carlos Eugênio Simon (Brazil)

29 June 2000
19:45 UTC−4

Chile	3–1	Paraguay
Caniza 19' (o.g.); Salas 35'; Zamorano 80' (pen.)	(Report)	Cardozo 71'

Estadio Nacional de Chile, Santiago
Attendance: 53,970
Referee: Claudio Martín (Argentina)

29 June 2000
20:30 UTC−5

Colombia	1–3	Argentina
Oviedo 26'	(Report)	Batistuta 23', 44'; Crespo 75'

Estadio Nemesio Camacho "El Campín", Bogotá
Attendance: 43,246
Referee: Jorge Larrionda (Uruguay)

=== Matchday 5 ===
18 July 2000
19:30 UTC−3

Uruguay	3–1	Venezuela
Olivera 28', 90+2'; Rodríguez 53'	(Report)	Noriega 23'

Estadio Centenario, Montevideo
Attendance: 58,000
Referee: René Ortubé (Bolivia)

18 July 2000
21:40 UTC−3

Paraguay	2–1	Brazil
Paredes 6'; Campos 83'	(Report)	Rivaldo 74'

Estadio Defensores del Chaco, Asunción
Attendance: 40,000
Referee: Jorge Larrionda (Uruguay)

19 July 2000
16:00 UTC−4

Bolivia	1–0	Chile
Suárez 85'	(Report)

Estadio Hernando Siles, La Paz
Attendance: 35,412
Referee: John Toro Rendón (Colombia)

19 July 2000
21:00 UTC−3

Argentina	2–0	Ecuador
Crespo 29'; C. López 49'	(Report)

Estadio Monumental Antonio Vespucio Liberti, Buenos Aires
Attendance: 44,199
Referee: Daniel Bello (Uruguay)

19 July 2000
21:10 UTC−5

Peru	0–1	Colombia
	(Report)	Ángel 48'

Estadio Nacional, Lima
Attendance: 32,207
Referee: Mario Sánchez Yanten (Chile)

=== Matchday 6 ===
25 July 2000
16:00 UTC−5

Ecuador	0–0	Colombia
	(Report)

Estadio Olímpico Atahualpa, Quito
Attendance: 37,617
Referee: Ubaldo Aquino (Paraguay)

25 July 2000
20:00 UTC−4

Venezuela	0–2	Chile
	(Report)	Tapia 70'; Zamorano 89'

Estadio Polideportivo de Pueblo Nuevo, San Cristóbal
Attendance: 14,880
Referee: Héctor Baldassi (Argentina)

26 July 2000
19:30 UTC−3

Uruguay	0–0	Peru
	(Report)

Estadio Centenario, Montevideo
Attendance: 54,345
Referee: Oscar Godoi (Brazil)

26 July 2000
21:45 UTC−3

Brazil	3–1	Argentina
Alex 5'; Vampeta 45', 50'	(Report)	Almeyda 45+1'

Estadio do Morumbi, São Paulo
Attendance: 80,000
Referee: Gustavo Méndez (Uruguay)

27 July 2000
16:10 UTC−4

Bolivia	0–0	Paraguay
	(Report)

Estadio Hernando Siles, La Paz
Attendance: 39,142
Referee: Luciano Almeida (Brazil)

=== Matchday 7 ===
15 August 2000
18:00 UTC−5

Colombia	1–0	Uruguay
Castillo 75'	(Report)

Estadio Nemesio Camacho "El Campín", Bogotá
Attendance: 31,000
Referee: Daniel Giménez (Argentina)

15 August 2000
21:30 UTC−4

Chile	3–0	Brazil
Estay 25'; Zamorano 43'; Salas 74'	(Report)

Estadio Nacional, Santiago
Attendance: 64,671
Referee: Epifanio González (Paraguay)

16 August 2000
16:00 UTC−5

Ecuador	2–0	Bolivia
Delgado 17', 59'	(Report)

Estadio Casa Blanca, Quito
Attendance: 25,000
Referee: Luis Solórzano (Venezuela)

16 August 2000
21:00 UTC−3

Argentina	1–1	Paraguay
Aimar 66'	(Report)	Acuña 60'

Estadio Monumental Antonio Vespucio Liberti, Buenos Aires
Attendance: 46,000
Referee: Antônio Pereira da Silva (Brazil)

16 August 2000
21:00 UTC−5

Peru	1–0	Venezuela
Palacios 69'	(Report)

Estadio Nacional, Lima
Attendance: 41,084
Referee: Byron Moreno (Ecuador)

=== Matchday 8 ===
2 September 2000
18:00 UTC−4

Paraguay	3–0	Venezuela
González 30'; Cardozo 34'; Paredes 43'	(Report)

Estadio Defensores del Chaco, Asunción
Attendance: 40,000
Referee: Juan Paniagua (Bolivia)

2 September 2000
20:30 UTC−4

Chile	0–1	Colombia
	(Report)	Castillo 66'

Estadio Nacional, Santiago
Attendance: 60,000
Referee: Gustavo Gallesio Greco (Uruguay)

3 September 2000
15:00 UTC−3

Uruguay	4–0	Ecuador
Magallanes 15'; Silva 37'; Olivera 50'; Cedrés 86'	(Report)

Estadio Centenario, Montevideo
Attendance: 62,000
Referee: Henry Cervantes (Colombia)

3 September 2000
17:45 UTC−5

Peru	1–2	Argentina
Samuel 68' (o.g.)	(Report)	Crespo 25'; Verón 37'

Estadio Nacional, Lima
Attendance: 43,951
Referee: Óscar Ruiz (Colombia)

3 September 2000
21:30 UTC−3

Brazil	5–0	Bolivia
Romário 11' (pen.), 77', 80'; Rivaldo 46'; Sandy 88' (o.g.)	(Report)

Estádio do Maracanã, Rio de Janeiro
Attendance: 55,000
Referee: Guido Alvarado (Chile)

=== Matchday 9 ===
7 October 2000
20:00 UTC−5

Colombia	0–2	Paraguay
	(Report)	Santa Cruz 3'; Chilavert 89'

Estadio Nemesio Camacho "El Campín", Bogotá
Attendance: 42,330
Referee: Horacio Elizondo (Argentina)

8 October 2000
15:00 UTC−4

Venezuela	0–6	Brazil
	(Report)	Euller 20'; Juninho 28'; Romário 31', 36', 38' (pen.), 63'

Estadio José Pachencho Romero, Maracaibo
Attendance: 6,350
Referee: Ubaldo Aquino (Paraguay)

8 October 2000
16:00 UTC−5

Ecuador	1–0	Chile
Delgado 75'	(Report)

Estadio Olímpico Atahualpa, Quito
Attendance: 28,556
Referee: John Toro Rendón (Colombia)

8 October 2000
16:00 UTC−4

Bolivia	1–0	Peru
Suárez 5'	(Report)

Estadio Hernando Siles, La Paz
Attendance: 21,791
Referee: José Carpio (Ecuador)

8 October 2000
20:00 UTC−3

Argentina	2–1	Uruguay
Gallardo 27'; Batistuta 41'	(Report)	Ayala 49' (o.g.)

Estadio Monumental Antonio Vespucio Liberti, Buenos Aires
Attendance: 48,792
Referee: Márcio Rezende de Freitas (Brazil)

=== Matchday 10 ===
15 November 2000
16:00 UTC−4

Bolivia	0–0	Uruguay
	(Report)

Estadio Hernando Siles, La Paz
Attendance: 29,112
Referee: Horacio Elizondo (Argentina)

15 November 2000
16:00 UTC−2

Brazil	1–0	Colombia
Roque Júnior 90+3'	(Report)

Estádio do Morumbi, São Paulo
Attendance: 56,213
Referee: Jorge Larrionda (Uruguay)

15 November 2000
19:45 UTC−3

Paraguay	5–1	Peru
Santa Cruz 15'; Del Solar 25' (o.g.); Cardozo 45'; Paredes 65'; Chilavert 83' (pen.)	(Report)	García 76'

Estadio Defensores del Chaco, Asunción
Attendance: 30,000
Referee: Daniel Giménez (Argentina)

15 November 2000
19:45 UTC−4

Venezuela	1–2	Ecuador
García 66'	(Report)	Kaviedes 3'; Sánchez 23'

Estadio José Pachencho Romero, Maracaibo
Attendance: 6,500
Referee: Eduardo Lecca (Peru)

15 November 2000
21:40 UTC−3

Chile	0–2	Argentina
	(Report)	Ortega 27'; Husaín 89'

Estadio Nacional, Santiago
Attendance: 56,529
Referee: Carlos Amarilla (Paraguay)

=== Matchday 11 ===
27 March 2001
19:00 UTC−5

Colombia	2–0	Bolivia
Ángel 52', 73' (pen.)	(Report)

Estadio Nemesio Camacho "El Campín", Bogotá
Attendance: 29,998
Referee: Wilson de Souza Mendonça (Brazil)

27 March 2001
21:30 UTC−5

Peru	3–1	Chile
Maestri 53'; Mendoza 72'; Pizarro 81'	(Report)	Navia 61'

Estadio Nacional, Lima
Attendance: 38,901
Referee: Ángel Sánchez (Argentina)

28 March 2001
15:00 UTC−5

Ecuador	1–0	Brazil
Delgado 49'	(Report)

Estadio Olímpico Atahualpa, Quito
Attendance: 40,800
Referee: Felipe Ramos (Mexico)

28 March 2001
19:30 UTC−3

Uruguay	0–1	Paraguay
	(Report)	Alvarenga 64'

Estadio Centenario, Montevideo
Attendance: 50,000
Referee: José María García Aranda (Spain)

28 March 2001
21:45 UTC−3

Argentina	5–0	Venezuela
Crespo 13'; Sorín 31'; Verón 51'; Gallardo 60'; Samuel 85'	(Report)

Estadio Monumental Antonio Vespucio Liberti, Buenos Aires
Attendance: 32,000
Referee: Gilberto Hidalgo (Peru)

=== Matchday 12 ===
24 April 2001
16:00 UTC−5

Ecuador	2–1	Paraguay
Delgado 44', 52'	(Report)	Cardozo 26'

Estadio Olímpico Atahualpa, Quito
Attendance: 30,145
Referee: Ángel Sánchez (Argentina)

24 April 2001
19:15 UTC−4

Venezuela	2–2	Colombia
Rondón 22'; Arango 82'	(Report)	Bedoya 83'; Bonilla 88'

Estadio Polideportivo de Pueblo Nuevo, San Cristóbal
Attendance: 19,000
Referee: Guido Aros (Chile)

24 April 2001
21:00 UTC−4

Chile	0–1	Uruguay
	(Report)	Díaz 12' (o.g.)

Estadio Nacional, Santiago
Attendance: 45,676
Referee: Horacio Elizondo (Argentina)

25 April 2001
16:00 UTC−4

Bolivia	3–3	Argentina
Paz 39'; Colque 54'; Botero 81'	(Report)	Crespo 44', 87'; Sorín 90'

Estadio Hernando Siles, La Paz
Attendance: 35,000
Referee: Óscar Ruiz (Colombia)

25 April 2001
21:45 UTC−3

Brazil	1–1	Peru
Romário 65'	(Report)	Pajuelo 77'

Estadio do Morumbi, São Paulo
Attendance: 55,000
Referee: Abdul Rahman Al-Zeid (Saudi Arabia)

=== Matchday 13 ===
2 June 2001
16:00 UTC−5

Peru	1–2	Ecuador
Pizarro 2'	(Report)	Méndez 11'; Delgado 90+1'

Estadio Monumental "U", Lima
Attendance: 54,236
Referee: Antonio Marrufo (Mexico)

2 June 2001
19:15 UTC−4

Paraguay	1–0	Chile
Paredes 90+2'	(Report)

Estadio Defensores del Chaco, Asunción
Attendance: 35,000
Referee: Rodrigo Badilla (Costa Rica)

3 June 2001
15:00 UTC−3

Argentina	3–0	Colombia
González 22'; López 35'; Crespo 38'	(Report)

Estadio Monumental Antonio Vespucio Liberti, Buenos Aires
Attendance: 46,500
Referee: Mario Sánchez Yanten (Chile)

3 June 2001
16:00 UTC−4

Bolivia	5–0	Venezuela
Baldivieso 32', 68'; Botero 35', 50'; Justiniano 38'	(Report)

Estadio Hernando Siles, La Paz
Attendance: 25,000
Referee: José Carpio (Ecuador)

1 July 2001
16:00 UTC−3

Uruguay	1–0	Brazil
Magallanes 33' (pen.)	(Report)

Estadio Centenario, Montevideo
Attendance: 61,249
Referee: Hugh Dallas (Scotland)

=== Matchday 14 ===
14 August 2001
19:00 UTC−4

Venezuela	2–0	Uruguay
Morán 52'; Rondón 90'	(Report)

Estadio José Pachencho Romero, Maracaibo
Attendance: 8,500
Referee: Antonio Marrufo Mendoza (Mexico)

14 August 2001
21:30 UTC−4

Chile	2–2	Bolivia
Salas 35', 75'	(Report)	Baldivieso 19' (pen.); Coimbra 71'

Estadio Nacional, Santiago
Attendance: 34,657
Referee: Daniel Giménez (Argentina)

15 August 2001
16:00 UTC−5

Ecuador	0–2	Argentina
	(Report)	Verón 19'; Crespo 34' (pen.)

Estadio Olímpico Atahualpa, Quito
Attendance: 38,156
Referee: Stefano Braschi (Italy)

15 August 2001
21:40 UTC−3

Brazil	2–0	Paraguay
Marcelinho Paraíba 4'; Rivaldo 69'	(Report)

Estádio Olímpico Monumental, Porto Alegre
Attendance: 48,000
Referee: Hellmut Krug (Germany)

16 August 2001
20:00 UTC−5

Colombia	0–1	Peru
	(Report)	Solano 47'

Estadio Nemesio Camacho "El Campín", Bogotá
Attendance: 33,875
Referee: Felipe Ramos (Mexico)

=== Matchday 15 ===
4 September 2001
20:00 UTC−3

Chile	0–2	Venezuela
	(Report)	Páez 56'; Arango 62'

Estadio Nacional, Santiago
Attendance: 30,000
Referee: René Ortubé (Bolivia)

4 September 2001
21:00 UTC−5

Peru	0–2	Uruguay
	(Report)	Silva 11'; Recoba 45'

Estadio Nacional, Lima
Attendance: 36,226
Referee: Anders Frisk (Sweden)

5 September 2001
19:00 UTC−4

Paraguay	5–1	Bolivia
Paredes 33'; Cardozo 45', 89'; Chilavert 50'; Santa Cruz 69'	(Report)	Paz 15'

Estadio Defensores del Chaco, Asunción
Attendance: 25,000
Referee: Luis Solórzano (Venezuela)

5 September 2001
20:00 UTC−3

Argentina	2–1	Brazil
Gallardo 76'; Cris 84' (o.g.)	(Report)	Ayala 2' (o.g.)

Estadio Monumental Antonio Vespucio Liberti, Buenos Aires
Attendance: 51,000
Referee: Urs Meier (Switzerland)

5 September 2001
20:30 UTC−5

Colombia	0–0	Ecuador
	(Report)

Estadio Nemesio Camacho "El Campín", Bogotá
Attendance: 28,487
Referee: Youssouf Al-Aqili (Saudi Arabia)

=== Matchday 16 ===
6 October 2001
16:00 UTC−4

Bolivia	1–5	Ecuador
Galindo 59'	(Report)	de la Cruz 13'; Delgado 23'; Kaviedes 56'; Fernández 89'; Gómez 90'

Estadio Hernando Siles, La Paz
Attendance: 8,000
Referee: Ángel Sánchez (Argentina)

6 October 2001
19:30 UTC−4

Venezuela	3–0	Peru
Alvarado 54', 77'; Morán 80'	(Report)

Estadio Polideportivo de Pueblo Nuevo, San Cristóbal
Attendance: 17,220
Referee: Mario Sánchez Yanten (Chile)

7 October 2001
16:00 UTC−3

Uruguay	1–1	Colombia
Magallanes 34' (pen.)	(Report)	Valentierra 67'

Estadio Centenario, Montevideo
Attendance: 60,000
Referee: Pierluigi Collina (Italy)

7 October 2001
16:00 UTC−3

Brazil	2–0	Chile
Edílson 52'; Rivaldo 63'	(Report)

Estádio Couto Pereira, Curitiba
Attendance: 52,000
Referee: Horacio Elizondo (Argentina)

7 October 2001
18:15 UTC−3

Paraguay	2–2	Argentina
Chilavert 51' (pen.); Morínigo 70'	(Report)	Pochettino 67'; Batistuta 73'

Estadio Defensores del Chaco, Asunción
Attendance: 45,000
Referee: Gilberto Hidalgo (Peru)

=== Matchday 17 ===
7 November 2001
16:00 UTC−5

Colombia	3–1	Chile
Grisales 19'; Ángel 67' (pen.); González 68'	(Report)	Riveros 39'

Estadio Nemesio Camacho "El Campín", Bogotá
Attendance: 16,050
Referee: Daniel Giménez (Argentina)

7 November 2001
16:00 UTC−5

Ecuador	1–1	Uruguay
Kaviedes 72'	(Report)	Olivera 43' (pen.)

Estadio Olímpico Atahualpa, Quito
Attendance: 40,000
Referee: Felipe Ramos (Mexico)

7 November 2001
20:00 UTC−4

Bolivia	3–1	Brazil
Paz 42'; Baldivieso 70', 89' (pen.)	(Report)	Edílson 26'

Estadio Hernando Siles, La Paz
Attendance: 32,574
Referee: Luis Solórzano (Venezuela)

8 November 2001
18:00 UTC−3

Argentina	2–0	Peru
Samuel 46'; C. López 84'	(Report)

Estadio Monumental Antonio Vespucio Liberti, Buenos Aires
Attendance: 18,901
Referee: Jorge Larrionda (Uruguay)

8 November 2001
19:00 UTC−4

Venezuela	3–1	Paraguay
Morán 2'; Noriega 22'; González 40'	(Report)	Arce 28' (pen.)

Estadio Polideportivo de Pueblo Nuevo, San Cristóbal
Attendance: 22,500
Referee: Horacio Elizondo (Argentina)

=== Matchday 18 ===
14 November 2001
20:30 UTC−5

Peru	1–1	Bolivia
Alva 8'	(Report)	Castillo 87'

Estadio Monumental "U", Lima
Attendance: 2,374
Referee: Héctor Baldassi (Argentina)

14 November 2001
20:40 UTC−3

Uruguay	1–1	Argentina
Silva 19'	(Report)	C. López 44'

Estadio Centenario, Montevideo
Attendance: 48,100
Referee: Markus Merk (Germany)

14 November 2001
20:40 UTC−3

Chile	0–0	Ecuador
	(Report)

Estadio Nacional, Santiago
Attendance: 19,237
Referee: Juan Paniagua (Bolivia)

14 November 2001
20:40 UTC−3

Paraguay	0–4	Colombia
	(Report)	Aristizábal 24', 34' (pen.), 62'; Castillo 82'

Estadio Defensores del Chaco, Asunción
Attendance: 25,000
Referee: Graham Poll (England)

14 November 2001
20:40 UTC−3

Brazil	3–0	Venezuela
Luizão 12', 19'; Rivaldo 34'	(Report)

Estadio Governador João Castelo, São Luís
Attendance: 65,000
Referee: Daniel Giménez (Argentina)

== Intercontinental play-off ==
Team 1	Agg.	Team 2	1st leg	2nd leg
Australia	1–3	Uruguay	1–0	0–3

== Qualified teams ==
The following five teams from CONMEBOL qualified for the final tournament.

Team	Qualified as	Qualified on	Previous appearances in FIFA World Cup^{1}
Argentina	Winners	15 August 2001	12 (1930, 1934, 1958, 1962, 1966, 1974, **1978**, 1982, **1986**, 1990, 1994, 1998)
Ecuador	Runners-up	7 November 2001	0 (debut)
Brazil	Third place	14 November 2001	16 (all) (1930, 1934, 1938, 1950, 1954, **1958**, **1962**, 1966, **1970**, 1974, 1978, 1982, 1986, 1990, **1994**, 1998)
Paraguay	Fourth place	8 November 2001	5 (1930, 1950, 1958, 1986, 1998)
Uruguay	OFC v CONMEBOL play-off winners	25 November 2001	9 (**1930**, **1950**, 1954, 1962, 1966, 1970, 1974, 1986, 1990)

^{1} Bold indicates champions for that year. Italic indicates hosts for that year.

== Goalscorers ==
There were 232 goals scored in 90 matches, for an average of 2.58 goals per match.

9 goals

- (Argentina) Hernán Crespo
- (Ecuador) Agustín Delgado

8 goals

- (Brazil) Rivaldo
- (Brazil) Romário

6 goals

- (Bolivia) Julio César Baldivieso
- (Paraguay) José Cardozo

5 goals

- (Argentina) Gabriel Batistuta
- (Argentina) Claudio López
- (Argentina) Juan Sebastián Verón
- (Paraguay) Carlos Humberto Paredes
- (Uruguay) Darío Silva

4 goals

- (Chile) Marcelo Salas
- (Chile) Iván Zamorano
- (Colombia) Juan Pablo Ángel
- (Paraguay) José Luis Chilavert
- (Uruguay) Nicolás Olivera
- (Venezuela) Ruberth Morán

3 goals

- (Argentina) Marcelo Gallardo
- (Argentina) Ariel Ortega
- (Bolivia) Joaquín Botero
- (Bolivia) Líder Paz
- (Colombia) Víctor Aristizábal
- (Colombia) Jairo Castillo
- (Ecuador) Iván Kaviedes
- (Paraguay) Roque Santa Cruz
- (Uruguay) Federico Magallanes

2 goals

- (Argentina) Walter Samuel
- (Argentina) Juan Pablo Sorín
- (Bolivia) Roger Suárez
- (Brazil) Edílson
- (Brazil) Luizão
- (Brazil) Vampeta
- (Brazil) Antônio Carlos Zago
- (Ecuador) Álex Aguinaga
- (Ecuador) Ulises de la Cruz
- (Paraguay) Hugo Brizuela
- (Peru) Juan Pajuelo
- (Peru) Roberto Palacios
- (Peru) Claudio Pizarro
- (Peru) Nolberto Solano
- (Venezuela) Wilfredo Alvarado
- (Venezuela) Juan Arango
- (Venezuela) Daniel Noriega
- (Venezuela) Alexander Rondón

1 goal

- (Argentina) Pablo Aimar
- (Argentina) Matias Almeyda
- (Argentina) Roberto Ayala
- (Argentina) Kily González
- (Argentina) Claudio Husaín
- (Argentina) Gustavo Adrián López
- (Argentina) Mauricio Pochettino
- (Bolivia) José Alfredo Castillo
- (Bolivia) Milton Coimbra
- (Bolivia) Percy Colque
- (Bolivia) Gonzalo Galindo
- (Bolivia) Raúl Justiniano
- (Bolivia) Jaime Moreno
- (Bolivia) Erwin Sánchez
- (Brazil) Alexsandro de Souza
- (Brazil) Euller
- (Brazil) Juninho Paulista
- (Brazil) Marcelinho Paraíba
- (Brazil) Roque Júnior
- (Chile) Fabián Estay
- (Chile) Javier Margas
- (Chile) Reinaldo Navia
- (Chile) Jaime Riveros
- (Chile) Héctor Tapia
- (Chile) Rodrigo Tello
- (Colombia) Gerardo Bedoya
- (Colombia) Víctor Bonilla
- (Colombia) Rafael Arlex Castillo
- (Colombia) Iván Córdoba
- (Colombia) Jersson González
- (Colombia) Freddy Grisales
- (Colombia) Frankie Oviedo
- (Colombia) Iván Valenciano
- (Colombia) Arnulfo Valentierra
- (Colombia) Alexander Viveros
- (Ecuador) Cléber Chalá
- (Ecuador) Ángel Fernández
- (Ecuador) Luis Gómez
- (Ecuador) Ariel Graziani
- (Ecuador) Eduardo Hurtado
- (Ecuador) Édison Méndez
- (Ecuador) Wellington Sánchez
- (Paraguay) Roberto Acuña
- (Paraguay) Francisco Arce
- (Paraguay) Celso Ayala
- (Paraguay) Jorge Luis Campos
- (Paraguay) Gabriel González
- (Paraguay) Gustavo Morínigo
- (Paraguay) Delio Toledo
- (Paraguay) Guido Alvarenga
- (Peru) Piero Alva
- (Peru) Pedro Alejandro García
- (Peru) Juan José Jayo
- (Peru) Flavio Maestri
- (Peru) Andrés Mendoza
- (Uruguay) Gabriel Cedrés
- (Uruguay) Pablo Gabriel García
- (Uruguay) Paolo Montero
- (Uruguay) Álvaro Recoba
- (Uruguay) Darío Rodríguez
- (Venezuela) Juan Enrique García
- (Venezuela) Héctor Gonzalez
- (Venezuela) Miguel Mea Vitali
- (Venezuela) Ricardo Páez
- (Venezuela) Giovanni Savarese
- (Venezuela) Edson Tortolero

1 own goal

- (Argentina) Walter Samuel (against Peru)
- (Brazil) Cris (against Argentina)
- (Chile) Ítalo Díaz (against Uruguay)
- (Bolivia) Marco Antonio Sandy (against Brazil)
- (Paraguay) Denis Caniza (against Chile)
- (Peru) José del Solar (against Paraguay)

2 own goals

- (Argentina) Roberto Ayala (against Uruguay and Brazil)

== Notes ==
- This was the first time that Brazil lost more than 2 matches and has not finished as leader (1st) of their qualifying group, during a FIFA World Cup qualification. That would happen again in the qualification to the 2026 World Cup.

== See also ==
- 2014 FIFA World Cup qualification (CONMEBOL)
- 2010 FIFA World Cup qualification (CONMEBOL)
- 2006 FIFA World Cup qualification (CONMEBOL)
- 1998 FIFA World Cup qualification (CONMEBOL)
