= 1999–2000 in Venezuelan football =

Football in Venezuela
- Season: 1999–2000

The following article presents a summary of the 1999–2000 football season in Venezuela.

== Venezuela national team ==
Date	Venue	Opponents	Score	Comp	Venezuela scorers	Fixture
1999-08-26	Estadio Hernando Siles; La Paz, Bolivia	Bolivia	0 - 0	F		163
1999-09-08	Estadio Centenario; Montevideo, Uruguay	Uruguay	2 - 0	F		164
1999-09-28	Stade Sylvio Cator; Port-au-Prince, Haiti	Haiti	2 - 3	F	unknown	165
2000-03-16	Estadio José Pachencho Romero; Maracaibo, Venezuela	Bolivia	0 - 0	F		166
2000-03-29	La Casa Blanca; Quito, Ecuador	Ecuador	2 - 0	WCQ02		167
2000-04-26	Estadio José Pachencho Romero; Maracaibo, Venezuela	Argentina	0 - 4	WCQ02		168
2000-05-31	Estadio Pueblo Nuevo; San Cristóbal, Venezuela	Panama	3 - 1	F	Castellín 12' 45'; Savarese 58'	169
2000-06-04	Estadio El Campín; Bogotá, Colombia	Colombia	3 - 0	WCQ02		170
2000-06-21	Estadio Rommel Fernández; Panama City, Panama	Panama	2 - 0	F		171
2000-06-28	Estadio Pueblo Nuevo; San Cristóbal, Venezuela	Bolivia	4 - 2	WCQ02	Mea Vitali 23'; Morán 39'; Savarese 61'; Tortolero 68' (pen)	172
2000-07-05	Estadio Tecnológico; Monterrey, Mexico	Mexico	2 - 1	F	Morán 27'	173
2000-07-18	Estadio Centenario; Montevideo, Uruguay	Uruguay	3 - 1	WCQ02	Noriega 23'	174
2000-07-25	Estadio Pueblo Nuevo; San Cristóbal, Venezuela	Chile	0 - 2	WCQ02		175
