= 1998–99 in Venezuelan football =

Football season

The following article presents a summary of the 1998-99 football season in Venezuela.

== Venezuela national team ==
Date	Venue	Opponents	Score	Comp	Venezuela scorers	Fixture
1999-01-27	Estadio José Pachencho Romero; Maracaibo, Venezuela	Denmark	1 - 1	F	Rey 65'	152
1999-02-03	Estadio José Pachencho Romero; Maracaibo, Venezuela	Argentina	0 - 2	F		153
1999-03-30	Estadio José Pachencho Romero; Maracaibo, Venezuela	Colombia	0 - 0	F		154
1999-03-30	Estadio Nacional; Caracas, Venezuela	Colombia	1 - 1	F	García 65'	155
1999-05-19	Estadio Reales Tamarindos; Portoviejo, Ecuador	Ecuador	0 - 2	F	Urdaneta 8' 56'	156
1999-06-15	Estadio Pueblo Nuevo; San Cristóbal, Venezuela	Ecuador	3 - 2	F	Rey 48'; García 90'; Morán 93'	157
1999-06-20	Estadio Misael Delgado; Valencia, Venezuela	Peru	3 - 0	F	Tortolero 28'; Rey 41'; De Ornelas 62'	158
1999-06-23	Estadio Nacional; Lima, Peru	Peru	3 - 0	F		159
1999-06-30	Estadio Antonio Oddone Sarubbi; Ciudad del Este, Paraguay	Brazil	6 - 0	CA99		160
1999-07-03	Estadio Antonio Oddone Sarubbi; Ciudad del Este, Paraguay	Chile	3 - 0	CA99		161
1999-07-06	Estadio Antonio Oddone Sarubbi; Ciudad del Este, Paraguay	Mexico	3 - 1	CA99	Urdaneta 72'	162
