= Venezuela national football team records and statistics =

The following is a list of the Venezuela national football team's competitive records and statistics.

== Individual records ==
=== Player records ===
As of 30 March 2026
Players in bold are still active with Venezuela.

==== Most capped players ====
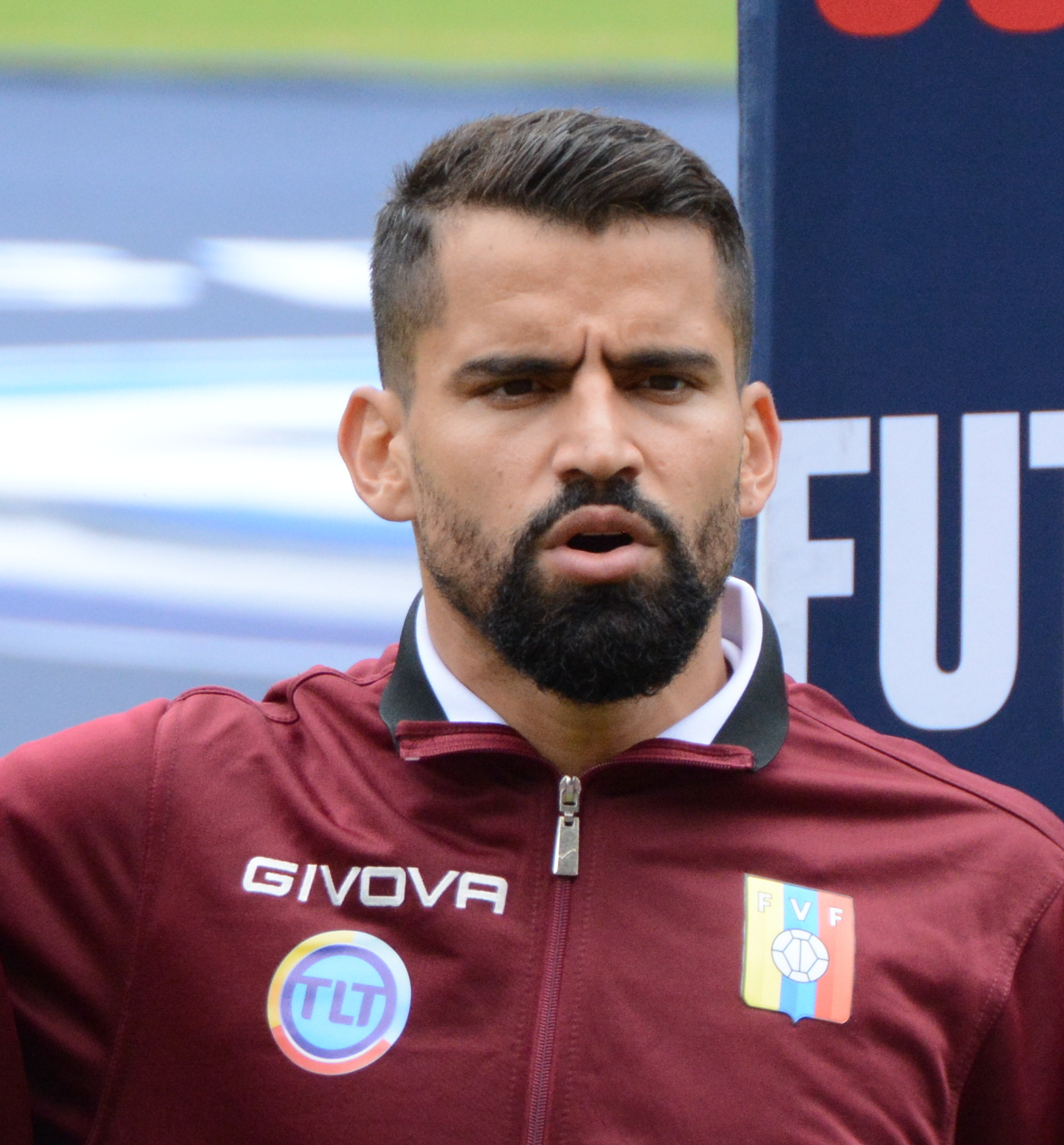
Midfielder Tomás Rincón is the most capped player with 143 appearances.

Rank	Player	Caps	Goals	Career
1	**Tomás Rincón**	143	1	2008–present
2	Juan Arango	129	23	1999–2015
3	**Salomón Rondón**	122	50	2008–present
4	José Manuel Rey	115	11	1997–2011
5	**Roberto Rosales**	95	1	2007–present
6	Jorge Alberto Rojas	87	3	1999–2009
7	Miguel Mea Vitali	85	1	1999–2012
8	Oswaldo Vizcarrondo	81	8	2004–2016
9	Luis Vallenilla	77	1	1996–2007
9	Gabriel Urdaneta	77	9	1996–2005

==== Top goalscorers ====
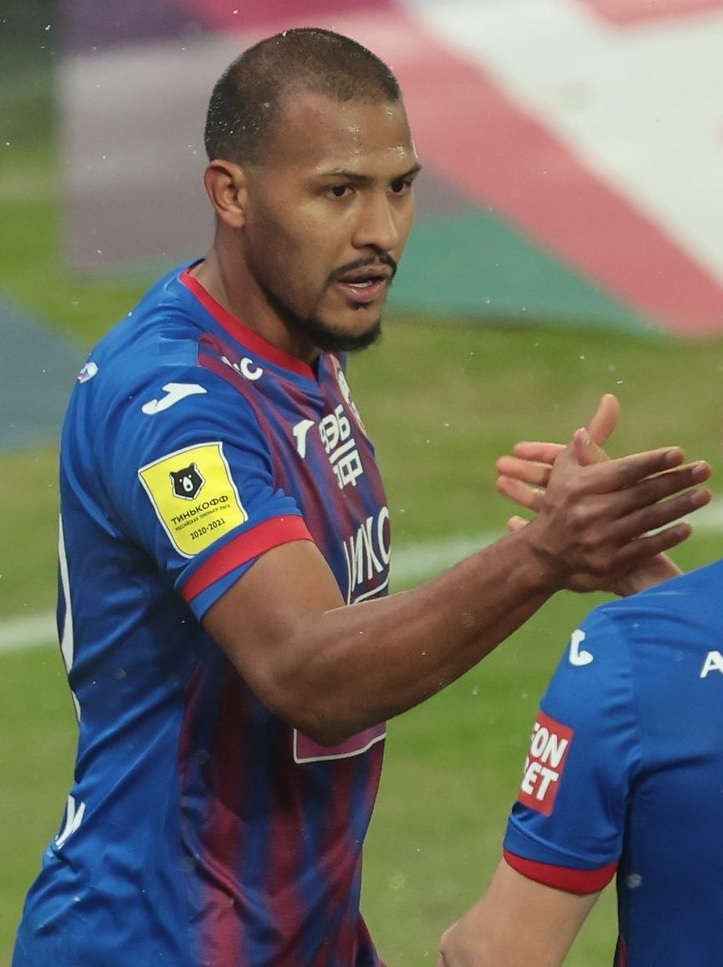
Salomón Rondón is the nation's all-time top goalscorer.

Rank	Player	Goals	Caps	Ratio	Career
1	**Salomón Rondón**	50	122	0.41	2008–present
2	Giancarlo Maldonado	22	65	0.34	2003–2011
2	Juan Arango	22	129	0.17	1999–2015
4	Ruberth Morán	14	63	0.22	1996–2007
4	**Josef Martínez**	15	70	0.21	2011–present
6	Miku	11	50	0.22	2006–2015
6	**Darwin Machís**	11	52	0.21	2011–present
8	Daniel Arismendi	10	30	0.33	2006–2011
8	José Manuel Rey	10	115	0.09	1997–2011
10	Gabriel Urdaneta	9	77	0.12	1996–2005

== Competition records ==
=== FIFA World Cup ===
FIFA World Cup record									FIFA World Cup qualification record					
Year	Round	Position	Pld	W	D	L	GF	GA	Pld	W	D	L	GF	GA
(Uruguay) 1930	Did not enter								Declined participation					
(Italy) 1934	Did not enter								Declined participation					
(France) 1938	Did not enter								Declined participation					
(Brazil) 1950	Did not enter								Declined participation					
(Switzerland) 1954	Did not enter								Declined participation					
(Sweden) 1958	Withdrew								Withdrew					
(Chile) 1962	Did not enter								Declined participation					
(England) 1966	Did not qualify								4	0	0	4	4	15
(Mexico) 1970	Did not qualify								6	0	1	5	1	18
(West Germany) 1974	Withdrew								Withdrew					
(Argentina) 1978	Did not qualify								4	0	1	3	2	8
(Spain) 1982	Did not qualify								4	1	0	3	1	9
(Mexico) 1986	Did not qualify								6	0	1	5	5	15
(Italy) 1990	Did not qualify								4	0	0	4	1	18
(United States) 1994	Did not qualify								8	1	0	7	4	34
(France) 1998	Did not qualify								16	0	3	13	8	41
(South Korea) (Japan) 2002	Did not qualify								18	5	1	12	18	44
(Germany) 2006	Did not qualify								18	5	3	10	20	28
(South Africa) 2010	Did not qualify								18	6	4	8	23	29
(Brazil) 2014	Did not qualify								16	5	5	6	14	20
(Russia) 2018	Did not qualify								18	2	6	10	19	35
(Qatar) 2022	Did not qualify								18	3	1	14	14	34
(Canada) (Mexico) (United States) 2026	Did not qualify								18	4	6	8	18	28
Total		0/23							176	32	32	112	152	376

=== Copa América ===
Champions Runners-up Third place Fourth place

South American Championship / Copa América record
Year	Round	Position	Pld	W	D	L	GF	GA	Squad
(Argentina) 1916	Did not participate								
(Uruguay) 1917	Did not participate								
(Brazil) 1919	Did not participate								
(Chile) 1920	Did not participate								
(Argentina) 1921	Did not participate								
(Brazil) 1922	Did not participate								
(Uruguay) 1923	Did not participate								
(Uruguay) 1924	Did not participate								
(Argentina) 1925	Did not participate								
(Chile) 1926	Did not participate								
(Peru) 1927	Did not participate								
(Argentina) 1929	Did not participate								
(Peru) 1935	Did not participate								
(Argentina) 1937	Did not participate								
(Peru) 1939	Did not participate								
(Chile) 1941	Did not participate								
(Uruguay) 1942	Did not participate								
(Chile) 1945	Did not participate								
(Argentina) 1946	Did not participate								
(Ecuador) 1947	Did not participate								
(Brazil) 1949	Did not participate								
(Peru) 1953	Did not participate								
(Chile) 1955	Did not participate								
(Uruguay) 1956	Did not participate								
(Peru) 1957	Did not participate								
(Argentina) 1959	Did not participate								
(Ecuador) 1959	Did not participate								
(Bolivia) 1963	Did not participate								
(Uruguay) 1967	Fifth place	5th	5	1	0	4	7	16	Squad
1975	Group stage	10th	4	0	0	4	1	26	Squad
1979	Group stage	10th	4	0	2	2	1	12	Squad
1983	Group stage	10th	4	0	1	3	1	10	Squad
(Argentina) 1987	Group stage	10th	2	0	0	2	1	8	Squad
(Brazil) 1989	Group stage	10th	4	0	1	3	4	11	Squad
(Chile) 1991	Group stage	10th	4	0	0	4	1	15	Squad
(Ecuador) 1993	Group stage	11th	3	0	2	1	6	11	Squad
(Uruguay) 1995	Group stage	12th	3	0	0	3	4	10	Squad
(Bolivia) 1997	Group stage	12th	3	0	0	3	0	5	Squad
(Paraguay) 1999	Group stage	12th	3	0	0	3	1	13	Squad
(Colombia) 2001	Group stage	12th	3	0	0	3	0	7	Squad
(Peru) 2004	Group stage	11th	3	0	1	2	2	5	Squad
(Venezuela) 2007	Quarter-finals	6th	4	1	2	1	5	6	Squad
(Argentina) 2011	Fourth place	4th	6	2	3	1	7	8	Squad
(Chile) 2015	Group stage	9th	3	1	0	2	2	3	Squad
(United States) 2016	Quarter-finals	6th	4	2	1	1	4	5	Squad
(Brazil) 2019	Quarter-finals	7th	4	1	2	1	3	3	Squad
(Brazil) 2021	Group stage	9th	4	0	2	2	2	6	Squad
(United States) 2024	Quarter-finals	5th	4	3	1	0	7	2	Squad
Total	Fourth place	20/48	74	11	18	45	59	182	—

=== Pan American Games ===
Pan American Games record
Year	Round	Position	Pld	W	D	L	GF	GA
(Argentina) 1951	Fourth place	4th	4	1	0	3	5	14
(Mexico) 1955	Fourth place	4th	6	1	2	3	9	20
(United States) 1959	Did not participate							
(Brazil) 1963	Did not participate							
(Canada) 1967	Did not participate							
(Colombia) 1971	Did not participate							
(Mexico) 1975	Did not participate							
(Puerto Rico) 1979	Did not participate							
(Venezuela) 1983	Group stage	7th	2	1	0	1	3	3
(United States) 1987	Did not qualify							
(Cuba) 1991	Did not qualify							
(Argentina) 1995	Did not qualify							
Since 1999	See Venezuela national under-23 football team							
Total	Fourth place	3/12	12	3	2	7	17	37

== Head-to-head record ==
The list shows the Venezuela national football team all-time international record against opposing nations.

As of 6 October 2026.

Opponent	P	W	D*	L	%W	GF	GA	GD
Panama	16	5	6	5	31.25%	23	22	+1
Mexico	14	1	3	10	7.14%	11	30	–19
El Salvador	5	3	0	2	60%	7	6	+1
Costa Rica	13	3	4	6	23.08%	19	24	–5
Colombia	43	8	15	20	18.6%	32	60	–28
Bolivia	42	15	10	17	35.71%	68	83	–15
Peru	39	9	7	23	23.08%	42	65	–23
Ecuador	34	12	6	16	35.29%	37	59	–22
Aruba	1	1	0	0	100%	3	0	+3
Haiti	6	2	2	2	33.33%	8	10	–2
Curaçao (Note: Includes matches against the Netherlands Antilles.)	6	2	2	2	33.33%	5	5	0
Guatemala	9	5	2	2	55.56%	11	9	+2
Puerto Rico	2	2	0	0	100%	13	0	+13
Cuba	1	1	0	0	100%	3	1	+2
Jamaica	7	4	1	2	57.14%	10	4	+6
Uruguay	34	5	10	19	14.71%	23	64	–41
Chile	31	5	5	21	16.13%	24	77	–53
Argentina	30	2	3	25	6.67%	19	95	–76
Paraguay	29	5	5	19	17.24%	25	51	–26
Brazil	31	1	6	24	3.23%	12	99	–87
Yugoslavia (Note: Defunct national team)	1	0	0	1	0%	0	10	–10
China	1	0	0	1	0%	0	1	–1
Spain	4	0	0	4	0%	2	13	–11
United States	6	1	2	3	16.67%	7	9	–2
Trinidad and Tobago	6	3	3	0	50%	11	3	+8
Honduras	13	7	2	4	53.85%	15	15	0
Iran	3	0	1	2	0%	1	3	–2
Morocco	1	0	0	1	0%	0	2	–2
Nigeria	2	0	0	2	0%	1	4	–3
Australia	2	1	1	0	50%	2	1	+1
Estonia	1	1	0	0	100%	3	0	+3
Russia (Note: Includes matches against the Soviet Union)	1	0	0	1	0%	0	4	-4
Switzerland	1	0	0	1	0%	0	1	–1
Austria	1	1	0	0	100%	1	0	+1
Sweden	1	1	0	0	100%	2	0	+2
New Zealand	1	1	0	0	100%	5	0	+5
Canada	4	0	3	1	0%	4	6	–2
Syria	2	2	0	0	100%	6	2	+4
Angola	1	0	1	0	0%	0	0	0
North Korea	1	1	0	0	100%	2	1	+1
Japan	6	1	3	2	16.67%	7	8	–1
Jordan	1	0	1	0	0%	0	0	0
Guinea	1	1	0	0	100%	2	1	+1
Moldova	1	1	0	0	100%	4	0	+4
South Korea	2	0	1	1	0%	1	3	–2
United Arab Emirates	2	2	0	0	100%	6	0	+6
Malta	1	1	0	0	100%	1	0	+1
Iraq	1	1	0	0	100%	2	0	+2
Saudi Arabia	2	2	0	0	100%	3	1	+2
Iceland	1	0	0	1	0%	0	1	–1
Uzbekistan	2	0	2	0	0%	1	1	0
Italy	1	0	0	1	0%	1	2	-1
Turkey	1	0	0	1	0%	1	2	-1
Total	467	119	107	241	25.48%	485	854	–369
