= 2003–04 in Venezuelan football =

The following article presents a summary of the 2003-2004 football season in Venezuela.

== Venezuela national team ==
Date	Venue	Opponents	Score	Comp	Venezuela scorers	Fixture
2003-08-20	Estadio Olímpico; Caracas, Venezuela	Haiti	3 - 2	F	Vielma 78'; Gonzalez 83'; Rivero 87'	205
2003-09-06	Estadio Olímpico Atahualpa; Quito, Ecuador	Ecuador	2 - 0	WCQ06		206
2003-09-09	Estadio Olímpico; Caracas, Venezuela	Argentina	0 - 3	WCQ06		207
2003-11-15	Estadio Metropolitano; Barranquilla, Colombia	Colombia	0 - 1	WCQ06	Arango 9'	208
2003-11-18	Estadio José Pachencho Romero; Maracaibo, Venezuela	Bolivia	2 - 1	WCQ06	Rey 90'; Arango 92'	209
2004-02-18	Estadio Olímpico; Caracas, Venezuela	Australia	1 - 1	F	Arango 91'	210
2004-03-10	Estadio José Pachencho Romero; Maracaibo, Venezuela	Honduras	2 - 1	F	Vera 35' (pk); Noriega 53'	211
2004-03-31	Estadio Centenario; Montevideo, Uruguay	Uruguay	0 - 3	WCQ06	Urdaneta 19'; Gonzalez 67'; Arango 77'	212
2004-04-28	National Stadium; Kingston, Jamaica	Jamaica	2 - 1	F	Arango 26'	213
2004-05-23	Estadio José Pachencho Romero; Maracaibo, Venezuela	South Africa	2 - 1	F	Páez 31'; Arango 92'	Non-Official
2004-06-01	Estadio Pueblo Nuevo; San Cristóbal, Venezuela	Chile	0 - 1	WCQ06		214
2004-06-06	Estadio Nacional; Lima, Peru	Peru	0 - 0	WCQ06		215
2004-07-06	Estadio Nacional; Lima, Peru	Colombia	0 - 1	CA04		216
2004-07-09	Estadio Nacional; Lima, Peru	Peru	1 - 3	CA04	Margiotta 74'	217
2004-07-12	Estadio Mansiche; Trujillo, Peru	Bolivia	1 - 1	CA04	Morán 27'	218
