= 2000–01 in Argentine football =

Football in Argentina
- Season: 2000–01

== Torneo Apertura ("Opening" Tournament) ==
Position	Team	Points	Played	Won	Drawn	Lost	For	Against	Difference
1	Boca Juniors	41	19	12	5	2	35	19	16
2	River Plate	37	19	10	7	2	41	24	17
3	Gimnasia La Plata	37	19	11	4	4	36	29	7
4	Talleres de Córdoba	36	19	11	3	5	31	21	10
5	San Lorenzo	34	19	10	4	5	33	18	15
6	Vélez Sársfield	29	19	7	8	4	26	20	6
7	Estudiantes La Plata	29	19	7	8	4	22	17	5
8	Huracán	27	19	6	9	4	26	21	5
9	Chacarita Juniors	27	19	8	3	8	19	24	-5
10	Colón de Santa Fe	26	19	7	5	7	29	23	6
11	Unión de Santa Fe	26	19	6	8	5	23	21	2
12	Rosario Central	24	19	6	6	7	28	31	-3
13	Newell's Old Boys	24	19	5	9	5	18	23	-5
14	Independiente	23	19	6	5	8	24	23	1
15	Lanús	21	19	5	6	8	24	26	-2
16	Belgrano de Córdoba	17	19	3	8	8	22	31	-9
17	Argentinos Juniors	14	19	2	8	9	18	28	-10
18	Almagro	13	19	2	7	10	18	31	-13
19	Los Andes	12	19	3	3	13	21	46	-25
20	Racing Club	11	19	1	8	10	12	30	-18

=== Top scorers ===
Position	Player	Team	Goals
1	Juan Pablo Ángel	River Plate	13
2	Martín Palermo	Boca Juniors	11
2	Bernardo Romeo	San Lorenzo	11
4	Ariel Pereyra	Gimnasia La Plata	10
4	Luis Rueda	Talleres de Córdoba	10
4	Ernesto Farías	Estudiantes La Plata	10
4	Daniel Tilger	Unión de Santa Fe	10

=== Relegation ===
There is no relegation after the Apertura. For the relegation results of this tournament see below

== Torneo Clausura ("Closing" Tournament) ==
Position	Team	Points	Played	Won	Drawn	Lost	For	Against	Difference
1	San Lorenzo	47	19	15	2	2	43	17	26
2	River Plate	41	19	13	2	4	48	27	21
3	Boca Juniors	30	19	8	6	5	29	26	3
4	Argentinos Juniors	29	19	8	5	6	27	22	5
5	Racing Club	29	19	7	8	4	21	20	1
6	Chacarita Juniors	29	19	8	5	6	21	25	-4
7	Huracán	28	19	8	4	7	28	28	0
8	Vélez Sársfield	27	19	7	6	6	25	24	1
9	Estudiantes La Plata	27	19	7	6	6	23	24	-1
10	Almagro	26	19	7	5	7	27	27	0
11	Talleres de Córdoba	25	19	7	4	8	23	23	0
12	Newell's Old Boys	24	19	7	3	9	27	28	-1
13	Colón de Santa Fe	23	19	6	5	8	21	27	-6
14	Lanús	22	19	6	4	9	28	30	-2
15	Unión de Santa Fe	20	19	5	5	9	32	36	-4
16	Belgrano de Córdoba	20	19	5	5	9	18	26	-8
17	Independiente	19	19	5	4	10	18	21	-3
18	Gimnasia La Plata	18	19	4	6	9	22	28	-6
19	Los Andes	18	19	5	6	8	24	32	-8
20	Rosario Central	17	19	4	5	10	24	38	-14

- Los Andes had 3 points deducted.

=== Top scorers ===
Position	Player	Team	Goals
1	Bernardo Romeo	San Lorenzo	15
2	Martín Cardetti	River Plate	13
3	Javier Saviola	River Plate	11
4	Hugo Brizuela	Chacarita Juniors	10

=== Relegation ===
Team	Average	Points	Played	1999-00	2000-01	2001-02
Boca Juniors	2.052	234	114	89	74	71
River Plate	1.947	222	114	58	86	78
San Lorenzo	1.815	211	114	61	69	81
Gimnasia de La Plata	1.456	166	114	62	49	55
Huracán	1.447	166	76	N/A	N/A	55
Rosario Central	1.438	164	114	47	66	41
Talleres de Córdoba	1.429	163	114	44	58	61
Vélez Sársfield	1.429	163	114	46	61	56
Newell's Old Boys	1.359	155	114	52	55	48
Independiente	1.350	154	114	51	61	42
Colón de Santa Fe	1.342	153	114	49	55	49
Chacarita Juniors	1.328	101	76	N/A	45	56
Unión de Santa Fe	1.315	150	114	54	50	46
Lanús	1.236	141	114	50	48	43
Estudiantes La Plata	1.228	140	114	45	39	56
Racing Club	1.228	140	114	55	45	40
Argentinos Juniors	1.149	131	114	49	39	43
Belgrano de Córdoba	1.052	120	114	44	39	37
Almagro	1.026	39	38	N/A	N/A	39
Los Andes	0.789	30	38	N/A	N/A	30

==== "Promoción" Playoff ====
Date	Home	Away	Result
June 13, 2001	Quilmes	Belgrano de Córdoba	1-0
June 16, 2001	Belgrano de Córdoba	Quilmes	1-0

The teams draw 1-1 therefore Belgrano de Córdoba stay in the Argentine First Division. Quilmes remains in Argentine Nacional B.

Date	Home	Away	Result
June 13, 2001	Instituto de Córdoba	Argentinos Juniors	0-0
June 16, 2001	Argentinos Juniors	Instituto de Córdoba	3-0

The teams draw 1-1 thereforeArgentinos Juniors stay in Argentine First Division. Instituto de Córdoba remains in Argentine Nacional B.

== Lower leagues ==
Level	Tournament	Champion
2nd	Primera B Nacional	Banfield
3rd	Primera B Metropolitana	Defensores de Belgrano
3rd (Interior)	Torneo Argentino A	Huracán de Tres Arroyos
4th	Primera C Metropolitana	Ituzaingó
5th	Primera D Metropolitana	Acassuso

== Argentine clubs in international competitions ==
Team	Intercontinental 2000	Copa Mercosur 2000	Copa Libertadores 2001
Boca Juniors	Champions	QF	Champions
Rosario Central	N/A	QF	SF
River Plate	N/A	SF	QF
San Lorenzo	N/A	Group stage	Group stage
Vélez Sársfield	N/A	Group stage	Group stage
Independiente	N/A	Group stage	did not qualify

== National team ==
This section covers the Argentina national team's matches from 1 August 2000 to 31 July 2001.

Win Draw Loss

=== Friendly matches ===
December 20, 2000	Argentina	2 – 0	Mexico	Los Angeles, United States
	Solari 14'; Galletti 82'	(Report)		Stadium: Los Angeles Memorial Coliseum; Attendance: 42,000

28 February 2001	Italy	1 – 2	Argentina	Rome, Italy
	Fiore 25'	(Report)	González 35'; Crespo 48'	Stadium: Stadio Olimpico; Attendance: 20,000

=== 2002 World Cup qualifiers ===
August 16, 2000 Round 7	Argentina	1 – 1	Paraguay	Buenos Aires, Argentina
21:00	Aimar 66'	(Report)	Acuña 60'	Stadium: Estadio Antonio V. Liberti; Attendance: 46,000; Referee: Antonio Pereira da Silva (Brazil)

September 3, 2000 Round 8	Peru	1 – 2	Argentina	Lima, Peru
17:00	Samuel 68' (o.g.)	(Report)	Crespo 25'; Verón 37'	Stadium: Estadio Nacional Jose Diaz; Attendance: 43,951; Referee: Óscar Ruiz (Colombia)

October 8, 2000 Round 9	Argentina	2 – 1	Uruguay	Buenos Aires, Argentina
20:00	Gallardo 27'; Batistuta 41'	(Report)	Ayala 49' (o.g.)	Stadium: Estadio Antonio V. Liberti; Attendance: 48,792; Referee: Marcio Rezende (Brazil)

November 15, 2000 Round 10	Chile	0 – 2	Argentina	Santiago, Chile
21:40		(Report)	Ortega 27'; Husaín 89'	Stadium: Estadio Nacional de Chile; Attendance: 56,529; Referee: Carlos Amarilla (Paraguay)

March 28, 2001 Round 11	Argentina	5 – 0	Venezuela	Buenos Aires, Argentina
21:30	Crespo 13'; Sorín 31'; Verón 51'; Gallardo 60'; Samuel 85'	(Report)		Stadium: Estadio Antonio V. Liberti; Attendance: 32,000; Referee: Gilberto Hidalgo (Peru)

April 25, 2001 Round 12	Bolivia	3 – 3	Argentina	La Paz, Bolivia
19:00	Paz 39'; Colque 54'; Botero 81'	(Report)	Crespo 44', 87'; Sorín 90'	Stadium: Estadio Hernando Siles; Attendance: 35,000; Referee: Óscar Ruiz (Colombia)

June 3, 2001 Round 13	Argentina	3 – 0	Colombia	Buenos Aires, Argentina
15:00	González 22'; López 35'; Crespo 38'	(Report)		Stadium: Estadio Antonio V. Liberti; Attendance: 46,500; Referee: Mario Sanchez Yanten (Chile)
