= Alexander Rondón =

Venezuelan footballer and manager (born 1977)

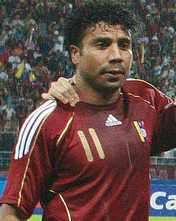

Personal information
- Full name: Alexander Rondón Heredia
- Date of birth: August 30, 1977 (age 49)
- Place of birth: Cumaná, Venezuela
- Height: 1.74 m (5 ft 9 in)
- Position: Striker

Senior career*
| Years | Team | Apps | (Gls) |
| 1997–1999 | Nueva Cádiz | | |
| 1999–2000 | Atlético Zulia | | |
| 2000–2002 | Caracas | | |
| 2002–2007 | Deportivo Táchira | | (27) |
| 2003 | → Estudiantes Mérida (loan) | | |
| 2004 | → São Paulo (loan) | 8 | (0) |
| 2007–2010 | Deportivo Anzoátegui | 62 | (26) |
| 2010 | Deportivo Lara | 12 | (1) |
| 2011–2014 | Aragua | 112 | (39) |
| 2014–2016 | Deportivo Anzoátegui | 25 | (3) |

International career
| 1999–2009 | Venezuela | 44 | (5) |
- * Club domestic league appearances and goals as of 11 August 2015

Alexander Rondón Heredia (born August 30, 1977) is a Venezuelan footballer and manager who played as a striker. He played over 44 times for the Venezuela national team since his debut in 1999.

== Early years ==
Rondón was born in Cumaná.

== Club career ==
=== Nueva Cádiz ===
Rondón started his playing career in 1997 with Nueva Cádiz. In 2000–01 he was part of the Caracas FC team that won the Primera División Venezolana.

=== Deportivo Táchira ===
In 2002, he joined Deportivo Táchira, he had loan spells with Estudiantes de Mérida (loan) and São Paulo of Brazil.

=== São Paulo ===
Known as the best player of Venezuelan football, Rondón signed on loan with São Paulo in 2004, as a substitute for Luís Fabiano, who would play for Porto, in second semester of that year. He was praised for Milton Cruz, assistant coach of club, and defenders Rodrigo and Fabão, who played against him in 2004 Copa Libertadores. However, Rondón couldn't shine in Brazilian football, playing only eight matches and scoring no goals. Months later, he came back to his country.

=== Deportivo Anzoátegui ===
In 2007, he joined Deportivo Anzoátegui where he became the top scorer in the Venezuelan league for the 2007–08 season earning him a recall to the national team after a two-year absence.

=== Deportivo Lara/Aragua FC ===
In 2010, he joined Deportivo Lara, before joining Aragua FC in 2011

== International career ==
Rondón has played for Venezuela in Copa América 1999, 2001 and 2004.

=== International goals ===
| # | Date | Venue | Opponent | Score | Result | Competition |
|---|---|---|---|---|---|---|
| 1. | 18 April 2001 | Estadio Alejandro Morera Soto, Alajuela, Costa Rica | Costa Rica | 0–1 | 2–2 | Friendly |
| 2. | 24 April 2001 | Pueblo Nuevo, San Cristóbal, Venezuela | Colombia | 1–0 | 2–2 | 2002 FIFA World Cup qualifying |
| 3. | 14 August 2001 | José Pachencho Romero, Maracaibo, Venezuela | Uruguay | 2–0 | 2–0 | 2002 FIFA World Cup qualifying |
| 4. | 6 February 2008 | Estadio Olímpico José Antonio Anzoátegui, Puerto La Cruz, Venezuela | Haiti | 1–1 | 1–1 | Friendly |
| 5. | 10 October 2009 | Polideportivo Cachamay, Puerto Ordaz, Venezuela | Paraguay | 1–2 | 1–2 | 2010 FIFA World Cup qualifying |
Correct as of 7 October 2015

== Titles ==
| Season | Team | Title |
|---|---|---|
| 2000–01 | Caracas FC | Primera División Venezolana |

Individual awards

- Primera División Venezolana topscorer: 2007–2008, 19 goals
