= Oswaldo Vizcarrondo =

Venezuelan football coach (born 1984)

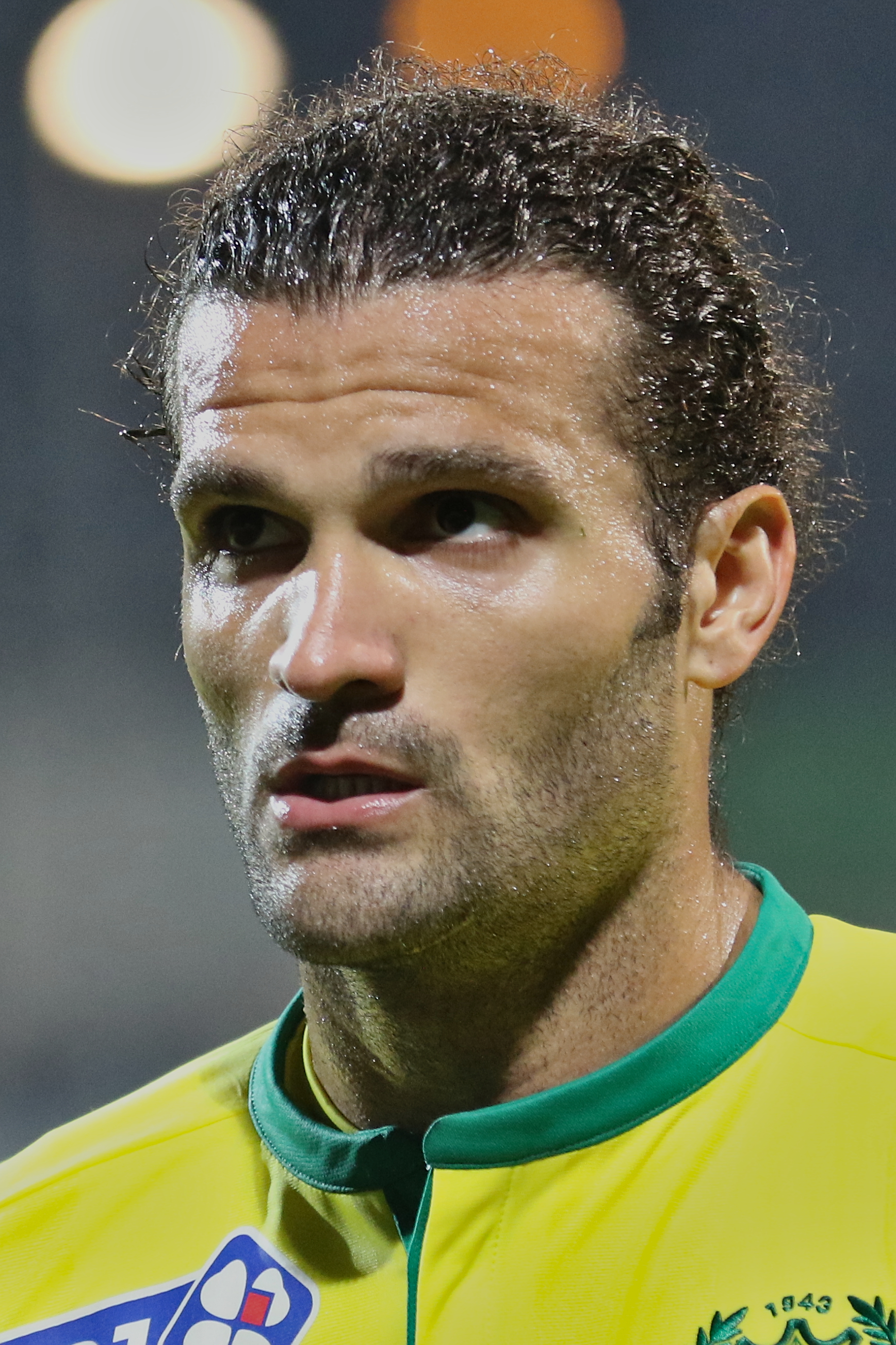
- Vizcarrondo with Nantes in 2015

Personal information
- Full name: Oswaldo Augusto Vizcarrondo Araujo
- Date of birth: 31 May 1984 (age 42)
- Place of birth: Caracas, Venezuela
- Height: 1.92 m (6 ft 4 in)
- Position: Centre-back

Team information
- Current team: Venezuela (head coach)

Youth career
- 1998–2001: Caracas

Senior career*
Years	Team	Apps	(Gls)
2002–2008	Caracas	122	(7)
2009	Olimpia	27	(5)
2010	Once Caldas	28	(3)
2011	Deportivo Anzoátegui	14	(1)
2011	Olimpo	14	(0)
2012–2013	América	12	(1)
2012–2013	→ Lanús (loan)	32	(0)
2013–2017	Nantes	122	(3)
2017–2019	Troyes	23	(0)
2020–2021	AS Sautron		
Total		394+	(20+)

International career
2004–2016	Venezuela	80	(7)

Managerial career
- 2022–2023: Nantes (women)
- 2023: Nantes (assistant)
- 2023: Venezuela U17 (assistant)
- 2023–2025: Venezuela U17
- 2024–2025: Venezuela U15
- 2024: Venezuela (women) (caretaker)
- 2025: Venezuela (caretaker)
- 2026–: Venezuela
- * Club domestic league appearances and goals

Oswaldo Augusto Vizcarrondo Araujo (Spanish pronunciation: [oˈswaldo βiθkaˈrondo], born 31 May 1984) is a Venezuelan professional football manager and former player who played as a centre-back. He is currently the head coach of the Venezuela national football team, having served as the head coach of the under-17 and under-15 teams, as well as the interim coach of the senior team previously.

An international since 2004, Vizcarrondo has reached more than 80 appearances and 7 goals for La Vinotinto and was part of the historical 2011 Copa América fourth place squad.

== International career ==
On 15 November 2011, Vizcarrondo scored the only goal in a 1–0 victory over Bolivia, a result that lifted Venezuela into a tie for first place in the World Cup qualifying standings.

=== International goals ===
Goal	Date	Venue	Opponent	Score	Result	Competition
1	12 August 2009	Giants Stadium, East Rutherford, New Jersey, United States	Colombia	2–1	2–1	Friendly
2	11 August 2010	Rommel Fernández Stadium, Panamá City, Panamá	Panama	0–1	3–1	Friendly
3	7 October 2010	Ramón Tahuichi Aguilera Stadium	Bolivia	0–2	1–3	Friendly
4	29 March 2011	Qualcomm Stadium, San Diego, United States	Mexico	1–1	1–1	Friendly
#	11 June 2011	Sam Boyd Stadium, Las Vegas Valley, United States	Mexico U-23	3–0	3–0	Friendly
5	17 July 2011	Estadio del Bicentenario, San Juan, Argentina	Chile	0–1	1–2	2011 Copa América
6	15 November 2011	Polideportivo de Pueblo Nuevo Stadium, San Cristóbal, Venezuela	Bolivia	1–0	1–0	2014 FIFA World Cup qualification
7.	23 May 2012	Polideportivo Cachamay, Puerto Ordaz, Venezuela	Moldova	3–0	4–0	Friendly

== Managerial career ==
In 2022, Vizcarrondo was appointed the head coach of the Nantes women's team.

== Honours ==
Caracas

- Primera División: 2003–04, 2006–07, 2008–09
- Torneo de Clausura: 2004, 2007
- Torneo de Apertura: 2003

Once Caldas

- Torneo de Finalización: 2010

Venezuela

- Copa América fourth place: 2011
