= Ricardo Páez =

Venezuelan footballer (born 1979)

- Ricardo Páez

Personal information
- Full name: Ricardo David Páez Gómez
- Date of birth: February 9, 1979 (age 47)
- Place of birth: Acarigua, Venezuela
- Height: 1.73 m (5 ft 8 in)
- Position: Midfielder

Senior career*
Years	Team	Apps	(Gls)
1996	ULA Mérida		
1997	Standard Liège		
1997	Estudiantes Mérida		
1998	Boca Juniors	0	(0)
1999	Lanús		
1999–2000	Estudiantes Mérida		
2000–2001	Deportivo Táchira		
2001	Nacional Táchira		
2002	San Luis		
2002–2003	Estudiantes Mérida		
2003	UA Maracaibo		
2003	Bani Yas		
2004	Barcelona SC		
2004	América Cali	17	(0)
2005	Deportivo Pereira	16	(4)
2005	Poli Timişoara	2	
2006	Deportivo Táchira	3	(0)
2006	PAS Giannina		
2007	Estudiantes Mérida		
2007–2008	Veria	15	(0)
2008	Alianza Lima	20	(3)
2009	César Vallejo	18	(1)
2009–2010	Castellón	21	(0)
2010–2014	Mineros Guayana	99	(11)

International career
2000–2007	Venezuela	64	(6)
- * Club domestic league appearances and goals as of 20 June 2010

Ricardo David Páez Gómez (born February 9, 1979, in Acarigua) is a retired Venezuelan footballer.

== Club career ==
During his career, Páez played in 10 countries, representing mainly Estudiantes de Mérida Fútbol Club - four spells. He also played in Belgium, Argentina (although he only appeared for the reserves at Boca Juniors), Mexico, United Arab Emirates, Ecuador, Colombia, Romania, Greece, Peru and Spain.

== International career ==
Páez made his debut for Venezuela on August 10, 2000, during a 5–1 friendly win in Costa Rica, subsequently representing the nation in three Copa América; in the 2007 edition, as the hosts progressed through the group stages, Páez scored once in three matches.

In total, he gained 64 international caps.

=== International goals ===
No.	Date	Venue	Opponent	Score	Result	Competition	Ref.
1.	September 4, 2001	Estadio Nacional de Chile, Santiago, Chile	Chile	0–1	0–2	2002 World Cup qualification	
2.	November 20, 2002	Brígido Iriarte, Caracas, Venezuela	Uruguay	1–0	1–0	Friendly	
3.	April 2, 2003	Brígido Iriarte, Caracas, Venezuela	Jamaica	2–0	2–0	Friendly	
4.	February 9, 2005	José Pachencho Romero, Maracaibo, Venezuela	Estonia	1–0	3–0	Friendly	
5.	March 28, 2007	José Pachencho Romero, Maracaibo, Venezuela	New Zealand	1–0	5–0	Friendly	
6.	June 26, 2007	Pueblo Nuevo, San Cristóbal, Venezuela	Bolivia	2–1	2–2	2007 Copa América	

== Personal life ==
Páez's father, Richard, was once coach of the national team.
