= Líder Paz =

Bolivian footballer (born 1974)

Personal information
- Full name: Líder Paz Colodro
- Date of birth: December 2, 1974 (age 51)
- Place of birth: Mineros, Santa Cruz, Bolivia
- Height: 1.70 m (5 ft 7 in)
- Position: Striker

Senior career*
Years	Team	Apps	(Gls)
1995–2000	Guabirá	169	(34)
2001	The Strongest	34	(12)
2002	Oriente Petrolero	27	(12)
2003	Bolívar	27	(6)
2004–2006	The Strongest	92	(16)
2007	Real Potosí	9	(2)

International career^{‡}
1999–2005	Bolivia	21	(3)
- * Club domestic league appearances and goals as of February 19, 2008 ‡ National team caps and goals as of October 30, 2005

Líder Paz Colodro (born December 2, 1974) is a retired Bolivian football striker who played his entire career in the Liga de Fútbol Profesional Boliviano.

== Club career ==
His former clubs are Guabirá, The Strongest, Oriente Petrolero, Bolívar and Real Potosí.

== International career ==
He also played for the Bolivia national team between 1999 and 2005, scoring 3 goals in 21 games.
