= Percy Colque =

Bolivian footballer (born 1976)

Personal information
- Full name: Percy Colque Paredes
- Date of birth: October 23, 1976 (age 50)
- Place of birth: La Paz, Bolivia
- Height: 1.67 m (5 ft 6 in)
- Position: Defender

Senior career*
Years	Team	Apps	(Gls)
1995	The Strongest		
1997	Deportivo Municipal		
1998	Chaco Petrolero		
1999	San José		
2000–2001	The Strongest	56	(8)
2001	Tigres UANL	3	(0)
2002–2005	Bolívar	115	(15)
2006	KF Tirana	5	(0)
2007–2008	Real Potosí	35	(2)
2009–2011	The Strongest	34	(1)
2014	FC Meyrin		

International career^{‡}
2000–2005	Bolivia	20	(2)
- * Club domestic league appearances and goals as of October 1, 2009 ‡ National team caps and goals as of April 15, 2008

Percy Colque Paredes (born October 23, 1976) is a Bolivian former footballer who played as a defender.

== Club career ==
Colque played for local clubs The Strongest, Deportivo Municipal, Chaco Petrolero, San José and Bolívar as well as for Mexican side UANL Tigres and Albanian club KF Tirana.

In 2014, at the age of 38, he played for FC Meyrin of the Swiss 1. Liga.

== International career ==
He played for the Bolivia national team between 2002 and 2005, scoring 2 goals in 20 games. He represented them at the 2001 Copa América.
