= Miguel Mea Vitali =

Venezuelan footballer (born 1981)

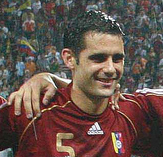

Personal information
- Full name: Miguel Ángel Mea Vitali
- Date of birth: February 19, 1981 (age 45)
- Place of birth: Caracas, Venezuela
- Height: 1.79 m (5 ft 10 in)
- Position: Defensive midfielder

Senior career*
Years	Team	Apps	(Gls)
1998–2000	Caracas FC	31	(0)
2000–2001	Lleida	16	(0)
2002	Poggibonsi	10	(0)
2002	Caracas FC	8	(0)
2003–2004	Chacarita Juniors	7	(0)
2004	Caracas FC	0	(0)
2004–2006	Lazio	0	(0)
2005	→ Sora (loan)	6	(0)
2006	Levadiakos	15	(0)
2006–2008	Maracaibo	26	(2)
2008–2009	Vaduz	16	(0)
2009–2011	Aragua	35	(6)
2011–2014	ACD Lara	91	(10)
2014–2017	Caracas FC	123	(11)

International career
1999–2012	Venezuela	84	(1)
- * Club domestic league appearances and goals

Miguel Ángel Mea Vitali (born February 19, 1981, in Caracas) is a Venezuelan former football midfielder.

== Club career ==
Mea Vitali started his career with Caracas FC in his home town. He has played professional football in several countries in Europe and South America, including; UE Lleida in Spain, Poggibonsi in Italy, Chacarita Juniors in Argentina and Levadiakos in Greece.

== International career ==
Mea Vitali has played 87 games for the Venezuela national team, scoring one goal.

=== International goals ===
No.	Date	Venue	Opponent	Score	Result	Competition	Ref.
1.	June 28, 2000	Pueblo Nuevo, San Cristóbal, Venezuela	Bolivia	1–0	4-2	2002 FIFA World Cup qualification	
