= Raúl Justiniano =

Bolivian footballer (born 1977)

Personal information
- Full name: Miguel Raúl Justiniano Abella
- Date of birth: September 29, 1977 (age 49)
- Place of birth: Santa Cruz de la Sierra, Bolivia
- Height: 1.77 m (5 ft 10 in)
- Position: Midfielder

Youth career
- 1995–1997: Blooming

Senior career*
Years	Team	Apps	(Gls)
1998–2001	Blooming	118	(3)
2002–2003	→ Oriente Petrolero (loan)	64	(3)
2004	Blooming	17	(1)
2004	Universitario	0	(0)
2005	Wilstermann	19	(0)
2006	Bolívar	23	(1)
2007	Real Mamoré	32	(4)
2008	Guabirá	20	(1)
2009	La Paz	8	(0)

International career
1999–2005	Bolivia	26	(1)
- * Club domestic league appearances and goals as of May 23, 2008

Miguel Raúl Justiniano Abella (born September 29, 1977, in Santa Cruz de la Sierra) is a Bolivian retired football midfielder who played for the Bolivia national team in Copa América 1999 and Copa América 2001.

== Club career ==
At club level Justiniano had two spells with Blooming. During the first period with the millonarios, he won back-to-back national titles. Subsequently, he would also play for Real Mamoré, Oriente Petrolero, Universitario de Sucre, Wilstermann, Bolívar, Guabirá and La Paz where he finished his career in 2009.

== International career ==
As a plus, Justiniano also played for the Bolivia national team between 1999 and 2005, scoring 1 goal in 26 games. He represented his country in 13 FIFA World Cup qualification matches and at the 1999 Confederations Cup.

== Honours ==
=== Club ===
- Blooming
  - Liga de Fútbol Profesional Boliviano: 1998, 1999
- Bolívar
  - Liga de Fútbol Profesional Boliviano: 2006 (A)
