= Wilfredo Alvarado =

Venezuelan footballer (born 1970)

Personal information
- Full name: Wilfredo José Alvarado Lima
- Date of birth: October 4, 1970 (age 56)
- Place of birth: Acarigua, Venezuela
- Height: 1.80 m (5 ft 11 in)
- Position: Defender

Senior career*
Years	Team	Apps	(Gls)
1999–2001	Deportivo Táchira		
2000–2001	Nacional Táchira		
2001–2002	Deportivo Italia		
2002–2003	Deportivo Anzoátegui		
2003–2004	UA Maracaibo		
2004–2005	Deportivo Táchira		
2005–2007	Portuguesa Fútbol Club		
2007–2009	Llaneros de Guanare		

International career
1997–2008	Venezuela	36	(2)
- * Club domestic league appearances and goals as of May 2009

Wilfredo José Alvarado Lima (born 4 October 1970, in Acarigua) is a Venezuelan football defender. He made a total of 36 appearances for the Venezuela national team between 1997 and 2008. He started his professional career at Deportivo Táchira.
