= Gabriel Urdaneta =

Venezuelan footballer (born 1976)

Gaby Urdaneta
Personal information
- Full name: Gabriel José Urdaneta Rangel
- Date of birth: 7 January 1976 (age 50)
- Place of birth: Mérida, Venezuela
- Height: 1.71 m (5 ft 7 in)
- Position: Midfielder

Senior career*
Years	Team	Apps	(Gls)
1994–1999	Universidad de Los Andes		
1996–1999	→ Atlético Zulia (loan)		
1999–2000	Caracas		
2000–2002	Lucerne	27	(3)
2002–2003	Waldhof Mannheim	13	(0)
2003	Lugano	4	(1)
2004	Kriens	23	(6)
2004–2005	Young Boys	35	(2)
2006	Vaduz	11	(1)
2006–2008	Maracaibo	41	(1)
2008–2009	Estudiantes de Mérida	30	(6)
2008–2010	Deportivo Italia	27	(6)
2010–2011	Deportivo Anzoategui	32	(1)
2011–2014	FC Köniz	57	(13)
Total		300	(40)

International career^{‡}
1996–2005	Venezuela	77	(9)
- * Club domestic league appearances and goals as of 17:01, 7 March 2021 ‡ National team caps and goals as of 17:01, 7 March 2021

Gabriel José Urdaneta Rangel (born 7 January 1976) is a Venezuelan retired footballer.

== Club career ==
Urdaneta has played professional football for a number of clubs in Venezuela and Switzerland. Manager Andy Egli then took him along to German second-tier side Waldhof Mannheim. He also holds Swiss nationality.

At the end of the 2010-2011 season, he announced his professional retirement, but he then joined lower league FC Köniz. He also became a youth coach there and in 2019 moved to FC Muri-Gümligen.

== International career ==
He made 77 appearances for the Venezuela national team between 1996 and 2005, making him the 9th most-capped player in Venezuelan international football as of March 2026.

=== International goals ===
Goal	Date	Venue	Opponent	Score	Result	Competition
1.	May 19, 1999	Reales Tamarindos, Portoviejo, Ecuador	Ecuador	0–1	0-2	Friendly
2.	May 19, 1999	Reales Tamarindos, Portoviejo, Ecuador	Ecuador	0–2	0-2	Friendly
3.	July 7, 1999	Antonio Oddone Sarubbi, Ciudad Del Este, Paraguay	Mexico	3–1	3-1	1999 Copa América
4.	August 10, 2000	Alejandro Morera Soto, Alajuela, Costa Rica	Costa Rica	1–1	1-5	Friendly
5.	August 10, 2000	Alejandro Morera Soto, Alajuela, Costa Rica	Costa Rica	1–2	1-5	Friendly
6.	April 2, 2003	Brígido Iriarte, Caracas, Venezuela	Jamaica	1–0	2-0	Friendly
7.	June 7, 2003	Orange Bowl, Miami, United States	Honduras	1–1	2-1	Friendly
8.	March 31, 2004	Centenario, Montevideo, Uruguay	Uruguay	0–1	0-3	2006 FIFA World Cup qualification
9.	October 14, 2004	Pueblo Nuevo, San Cristóbal, Venezuela	Ecuador	1–0	3-1	2006 FIFA World Cup qualification

== Personal life ==
Urdaneta's wife is Swiss and they have two daughters.
