= Mario Sánchez Yantén =

Chilean football referee (born 1956)

- Full name: Mario Sánchez Yantén
- Born: 22 July 1956 (age 70); Chile

International
Years	League	Role
1994-2001	FIFA	Referee

Mario Sánchez Yantén (born 22 July 1956) is a retired Chilean football referee.

He refereed two matches in the 1998 FIFA World Cup in France: Nigeria's 1–0 win over Bulgaria, and South Africa's 2–2 draw with Saudi Arabia. He also officiated the 2000 Summer Olympics in Sydney and the 1998 Intercontinental Cup final.
