= Juan Enrique García =

Venezuelan footballer (born 1970)

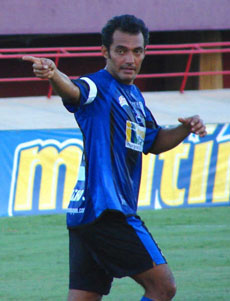

Personal information
- Full name: Juan Enrique García Rivas
- Date of birth: April 16, 1970 (age 56)
- Place of birth: Bolívar, Venezuela
- Height: 1.80 m (5 ft 11 in)
- Position: Striker

Senior career*
Years	Team	Apps	(Gls)
1988–1996	Minervén	160	(49)
1996–1997	Caracas	33	(12)
1997–1998	Zulia	25	(15)
1998–1999	U. de Los Andes	22	(13)
1999–2000	Caracas	38	(24)
2000–2001	ItalChacao	11	(2)
2001–2002	Deportivo Táchira	33	(34)
2002	Monagas	18	(8)
2003–2005	Mineros		(34)
2005–2006	Deportivo Táchira	35	(21)
2006	Mineros	7	(9)
2007	Deportivo Pasto	11	(2)
2007–2008	Mineros	7	(0)
2008–2009	Zamora	25	(15)
2009–2010	Mineros	28	(8)
2010–2011	Estudiantes Mérida	31	(8)
2011	Zamora	8	(0)
2012	Angostura	33	(19)
2012–2013	Zulia		
2013	Deportivo La Guaira	9	(0)

International career
1993–2009	Venezuela	49	(7)
- * Club domestic league appearances and goals as of 7 March 2012

Juan Enrique García Rivas (born April 16, 1970) is a Venezuelan football striker. He is the all-time leading goalscorer in the Venezuelan Primera División, and has been league top scorer in five different seasons (also a record).

== Club career ==
García played for a number of different clubs in Venezuela. He started his career with Minervén in 1988. In 1996, he joined Caracas FC where he was part of the championship winning squad. The following season, he joined Zulia where he won another league championship.

In 1999, he returned to Caracas FC where he became the top scorer in Venezuelan football for the first time. In the 2001–02 season he won another league title with Deportivo Táchira and claimed his second topscorer award. He was topscorer again in the following two seasons with Monagas and Mineros.

For the 2005–06 season, he returned to Deportivo Táchira where he became topscorer for the fifth time.

In 2007, he had a brief spell with Deportivo Pasto of Colombia

== International career ==
García played 49 times for the Venezuela national team between 1993 and 2009, scoring 7 goals. He was included in three Copa América squads in 1993, 1995 and 1999. He also played in World Cup Qualifiers for the 1994, 1998, 2002, 2006 and 2010 World Cups.

== Honours ==
=== Club ===
Caracas FC

- Venezuelan Primera División: 1996–97

Zulia

- Venezuelan Primera División: 1997–98

Deportivo Táchira

- Venezuelan Primera División: 2001–02

=== Individual ===
- Venezuelan Primera División topscorer: 1999–2000 (24 goals), 2001–02 (34 goals), 2002–03 (39 goals), 2003–04 (18 goals), 2005–06 (21 goals)
