= Ruberth Morán =

Venezuelan footballer (born 1973)

Rubérth Morán
Personal information
- Full name: Rubérth Morán
- Date of birth: August 11, 1973 (age 53)
- Place of birth: Mérida, Venezuela
- Height: 1.73 m (5 ft 8 in)
- Position: Striker

Senior career*
Years	Team	Apps	(Gls)
1993–1995	Estudiantes de Mérida		
1995	Minervén		
1996	Estudiantes de Mérida		
1996–1998	Atlético Zulia		
1998	Estudiantes de Mérida	17	(13)
1999–2000	Córdoba	11	(0)
2001	ItalChacao	0	(0)
2001–2002	Estudiantes de Mérida	17	(13)
2002–2003	Deportivo Táchira		(0)
2003–2004	Maracaibo		(21)
2004	Atlético Bucaramanga	18	(0)
2005	Argentinos Juniors	4	(0)
2005	Estudiantes de Mérida		
2006	Odd Grenland	0	(0)
2006	Cúcuta Deportivo	4	(0)
2007–2009	Deportivo Táchira		
2009	Estudiantes de Mérida		

International career
1996–2007	Venezuela	65	(14)

Managerial career
- 2014–2015: Deportivo Anzoátegui
- * Club domestic league appearances and goals as of 4 April 2008

Rubérth Morán (born August 11, 1973 in Mérida) is a retired Venezuelan football striker.

== Club career ==
Morán has played professional club football in a number of countries, including; Venezuela, Spain, Colombia, Argentina and Norway.

== International career ==
He has played 65 times for the Venezuela national team scoring 15 goals, making him the 4th all-time top scorer in the history of Venezuelan international football.

=== International goals ===
Scores and results list Venezuela's goal tally first.

Goal	Date	Venue	Opponent	Score	Result	Competition
1.	2 October 1996	Estadio Agustín Tovar, Barinas, Venezuela	Costa Rica	2–0	2–0	Friendly
2.	2 October 1996	Estadio Polideportivo de Pueblo Nuevo, San Cristóbal, Venezuela	Ecuador	3–0	3–2	Friendly
3.	28 June 2000	Estadio Polideportivo de Pueblo Nuevo, San Cristóbal, Venezuela	Bolivia	2–0	4–2	2002 FIFA World Cup qualification
4.	5 July 2000	Estadio Tecnológico, Monterrey, Mexico	Mexico	1–0	1–2	Friendly
5.	14 August 2001	Estadio José Pachencho Romero, Maracaibo, Venezuela	Uruguay	1–0	2–0	2002 FIFA World Cup qualification
6.	6 October 2001	Estadio Polideportivo de Pueblo Nuevo, San Cristóbal, Venezuela	Peru	3–0	3–0	2002 FIFA World Cup qualification
7.	8 November 2001	Estadio Polideportivo de Pueblo Nuevo, San Cristóbal, Venezuela	Paraguay	1–0	3–1	2002 FIFA World Cup qualification
8.	12 July 2004	Estadio Mansiche, Trujillo, Peru	Bolivia	1–0	1–1	2004 Copa América
9.	9 October 2004	Estadio José Pachencho Romero, Maracaibo, Venezuela	Brazil	1–5	2–5	2006 FIFA World Cup qualification
10.	9 October 2004	Estadio José Pachencho Romero, Maracaibo, Venezuela	Brazil	2–5	2–5	2006 FIFA World Cup qualification
11.	14 October 2004	Estadio Polideportivo de Pueblo Nuevo, San Cristóbal, Venezuela	Ecuador	2–1	3–1	2006 FIFA World Cup qualification
12.	14 October 2004	Estadio Polideportivo de Pueblo Nuevo, San Cristóbal, Venezuela	Ecuador	3–1	3–1	2006 FIFA World Cup qualification
13.	17 November 2004	Estadio Monumental Antonio Vespucio Liberti, Buenos Aires, Argentina	Argentina	1–1	2–3	2006 FIFA World Cup qualification
14.	8 June 2005	Estadio Nacional Julio Martínez Prádanos, Santiago, Chile	Chile	1–2	1–2	2006 FIFA World Cup qualification
