= Daniel Noriega =

Venezuelan footballer (born 1977)

Personal information
- Full name: Daniel Noriega Acosta
- Date of birth: 30 March 1977 (age 49)
- Place of birth: Puerto Ordaz, Venezuela
- Height: 1.72 m (5 ft 8 in)
- Position: Striker

Senior career*
Years	Team	Apps	(Gls)
1995–1997	Minervén		
1997–1998	Rayo Vallecano	8	(2)
1998–1999	Unión de Santa Fe	49	(10)
2000	Sporting Cristal	14	(2)
2001	Unión de Santa Fe	16	(0)
2002	Mineros		
2002–2003	ItalChacao		
2003–2004	Independiente Medellín	7	(0)
2004	Deportivo Táchira		
2005	Caracas		
2005	Mineros		
2006	Monagas		
2006–2008	Guaros FC	11	(3)
2008–2009	Llaneros	34	(1)

International career
1996–2005	Venezuela	38	(5)
- * Club domestic league appearances and goals

Daniel Noriega Acosta (born 30 March 1977) is a Venezuelan former professional footballer who played as a striker. He made a total number of 38 appearances (five goals) for the Venezuelan national team between 1996 and 2005.

== Club career ==
Noriega was born in Puerto Ordaz. He started his professional career at Minervén in 1995. Noriega also played in Peru, Argentina, Colombia and Spain.
