= Estadio Polideportivo de Pueblo Nuevo =

Stadium in San Cristóbal, Venezuela

Coordinates: 7°47′11″N 72°11′52″W

Polideportivo de Pueblo Nuevo
- "El Templo Sagrado" (The Sacred Temple)
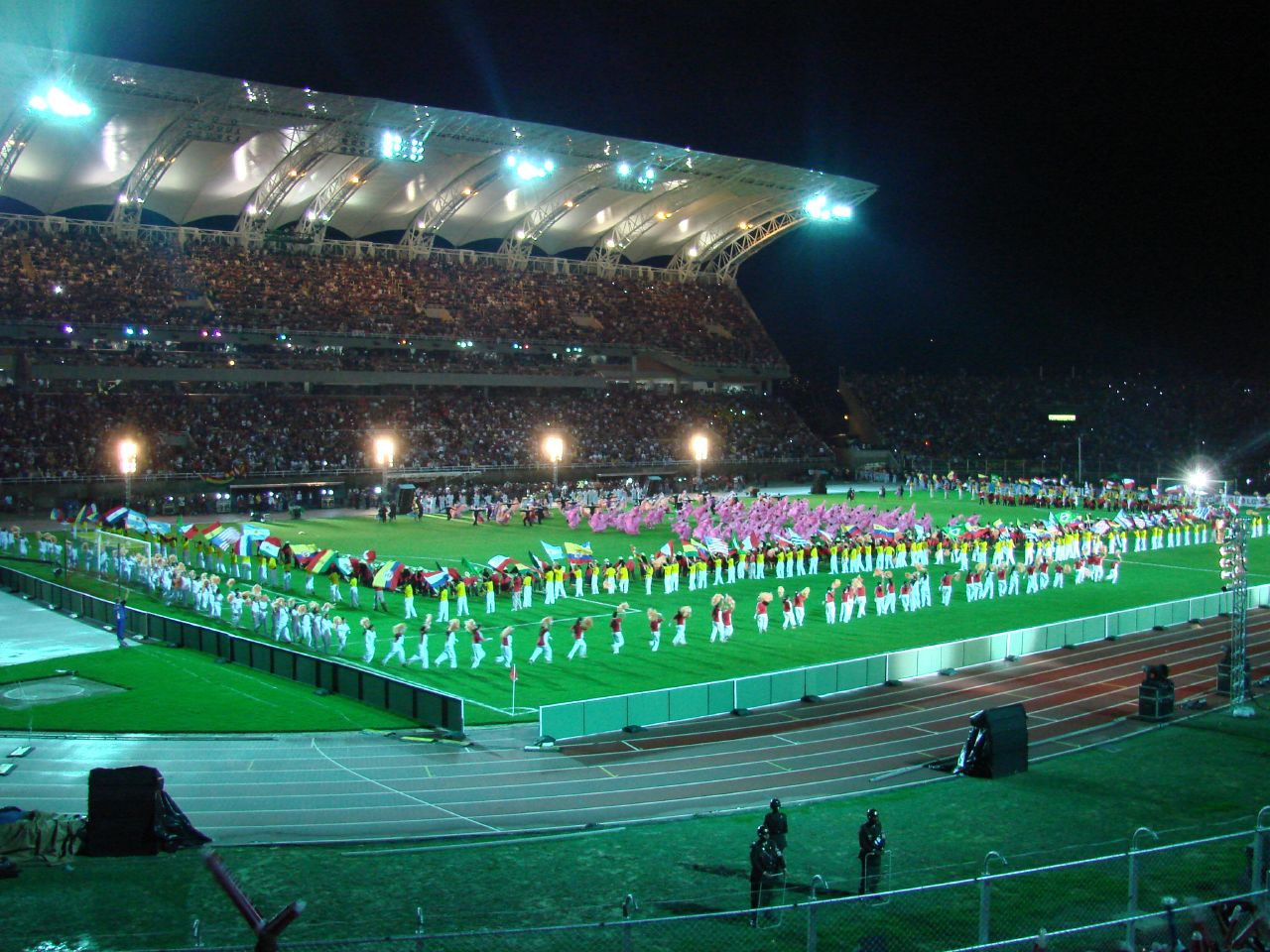
- Interactive map of Polideportivo de Pueblo Nuevo
- Full name: Estadio Polideportivo de Pueblo Nuevo
- Location: San Cristóbal, Venezuela
- Owner: Instituto Nacional del Deporte
- Capacity: 38,755; 38,453 (international)
- Surface: Grass

Construction
- Built: 1975
- Opened: January 11, 1976
- Renovated: 2007

Tenants
- Deportivo Táchira Fútbol Club; Venezuela national football team

Estadio Polideportivo de Pueblo Nuevo is a multi-purpose stadium in San Cristóbal, Venezuela. It is currently used mostly for football matches and is the home stadium of Deportivo Táchira Fútbol Club. The stadium holds 38,755 people.

It is known as "the sacred temple of football" in Venezuela, as it is in this stadium where Venezuela had some of its best football results, and it lies in the typically football-loving Andes region. However, contrasts with much of the country, as it is where baseball is more popular.

== Copa América 2007 ==
The stadium was one of the venues of the Copa América 2007, and held the following matches:

Date	Time(EDT)	Team #1	Res.	Team #2	Round
2007-06-26	20.45	Venezuela	2-2	Bolivia	Group A
2007-06-30	16.00	Bolivia	0-1	Uruguay	Group A
2007-06-30	20.45	Venezuela	2-0	Peru	Group A
2007-07-07	18.00	Venezuela	1-4	Uruguay	Quarter Finals
