= 2017 Venezuelan Primera División season =

Venezuelan Primera División
- Season: 2017
- Champions: Monagas (1st title)
- Relegated: Deportivo JBL; Atlético Socopó
- Copa Libertadores: Monagas; Deportivo Lara; Carabobo; Deportivo Táchira
- Copa Sudamericana: Mineros; Caracas; Estudiantes de Mérida; Zamora
- Matches: 336
- Goals: 810 (2.41 per match)
- Top goalscorer: Apertura: Edder Farías (13 goals); Clausura: Anthony Blondell (13 goals); Season: Anthony Blondell (24 goals)
- Biggest home win: Deportivo Lara 6–0 Portuguesa; 27 February 2017
- Biggest away win: Metropolitanos 0–5 Carabobo; 21 May 2017
- Highest scoring: Mineros 4–4 Anzoátegui; 16 April 2017; Deportivo Lara 6–2 Zamora; 11 November 2017

The 2017 Primera División season was the 36th professional season of Venezuela's top-flight football league. Zamora were the defending champions, but did not qualify to the Serie Final, after being eliminated by Monagas in the quarter-finals of the Torneo Apertura and by Deportivo Lara in the quarter-finals of the Torneo Clausura.

Monagas were the champions, defeating Deportivo Lara in the Serie Final, 2–1 on aggregate.

== Teams ==
=== Stadia and locations ===
Locations of the 2017 Primera División teams

Relegated to 2017 Segunda División
17	Ureña
18	Llaneros
19	Petare
20	Estudiantes de Caracas

Promoted to 2017 Primera División
1	Metropolitanos
2	Atlético Socopó

Team	City	Stadium	Capacity
Aragua	Maracay	Olímpico Hermanos Ghersi Páez	14,000
Atlético Socopó	Socopó	Rogelio Matos	7,500
Atlético Venezuela	Caracas	Brígido Iriarte	10,000
Carabobo	Valencia	Misael Delgado	10,400
Caracas	Caracas	Olímpico de la UCV	23,940
Deportivo Anzoátegui	Puerto La Cruz	José Antonio Anzoátegui	37,485
Deportivo JBL	Maracaibo	José "Pachencho" Romero	40,800
Deportivo La Guaira	Caracas	Olímpico de la UCV	23,940
Deportivo Lara	Cabudare	Metropolitano de Cabudare	47,913
Deportivo Táchira	San Cristóbal	Polideportivo de Pueblo Nuevo	38,755
Estudiantes de Mérida	Mérida	Metropolitano de Mérida	42,200
Metropolitanos	Caracas	Brígido Iriarte	10,000
Mineros	Ciudad Guayana	Polideportivo Cachamay	41,600
Monagas	Maturín	Monumental de Maturín	51,796
Portuguesa	Acarigua	General José Antonio Páez	18,000
Trujillanos^{a}	Valera	José Alberto Pérez	25,000
Zamora	Barinas	Agustín Tovar	29,800
Zulia	Maracaibo	José "Pachencho" Romero	40,800

^{a} Trujillanos played the matchday 11 of the Torneo Clausura (against Deportivo Lara) at the Estadio José Pachencho Romero in Maracaibo, after the Estadio José Alberto Pérez in Valera was suspended due to crowd disturbances in the Copa Venezuela round of 16 second leg against Zulia.

=== Personnel and kits ===
Team	Manager	Kit manufacturer	Shirt main sponsor
Aragua	(Venezuela) José Manuel Rey	(Venezuela) New Arrival	Gobierno Bolivariano de Aragua
Atlético Socopó	(Argentina) Fernando Capobianco	(Venezuela) Kiukak	Servical
Atlético Venezuela	(Spain) Alex Pallarés	(Germany) Adidas	FERRYJET
Carabobo	(Colombia) Wilson Gutiérrez	(Germany) Adidas	None
Caracas	(Venezuela) Noel Sanvicente	(Germany) Adidas	Maltín Polar
Deportivo Anzoátegui	(Venezuela) Charles López	(Venezuela) Academia Sport Wear	Gobierno Bolivariano de Anzoátegui
Deportivo JBL	(Venezuela) Frank Flores	(Venezuela) JBL Sports	SHIMGE
Deportivo La Guaira	(Venezuela) Pedro Depablos	(Germany) Adidas	Traki
Deportivo Lara	(Venezuela) Leonardo González	(Germany) Adidas	Brijot
Deportivo Táchira	(Venezuela) Francesco Stifano	(Germany) Adidas	SIMMONDS EQUIPMENTS
Estudiantes de Mérida	(Venezuela) José Nabor Gavidia	(Germany) Puma	Arand Supplies
Metropolitanos	(Venezuela) Daniel de Oliveira	(Spain) Joma	Seguros Venezuela
Mineros	(Venezuela) Juan Tolisano	(Venezuela) Sport Jugados	Gobernación de Bolívar
Monagas	(Venezuela) Jhonny Ferreira	(Germany) Adidas	Banplus
Portuguesa	(Argentina) Carlos Moreno	(Venezuela) Mundo Creativo	Alivenza
Trujillanos	(Argentina) Horacio Matuszyczk	(Venezuela) Kiukak	SUCASA
Zamora	(Venezuela) Alí Cañas	(Germany) Uhlsport	PDVSA
Zulia	(Venezuela) Carlos Maldonado	(Germany) Uhlsport	PDVSA

==== Managerial changes ====
Team	Outgoing manager	Manner of departure	Date of vacancy	Position in table	Incoming manager	Date of appointment
Torneo Apertura
Portuguesa	(Argentina) Horacio Matuszyczk	Sacked	22 February	16th	(Argentina) Carlos Moreno	24 February
Trujillanos	(Venezuela) Darío Martínez	Sacked	21 February	17th	(Argentina) Cristian Ferlauto	21 February
Atlético Socopó	(Venezuela) Giovanny Pérez	Sacked	26 March	17th	(Venezuela) Alberto Valencia	6 April
Estudiantes de Mérida	(Argentina) Juan Cruz Real	Resigned	3 April	15th	(Venezuela) José Nabor Gavidia	4 April
Deportivo JBL	(Venezuela) Frank Flores	Mutual consent	7 April	17th	(Colombia) José Cortina Henríquez	12 April
Atlético Venezuela	(Argentina) Ignacio González	Mutual consent	29 May	11th	(Spain) Alex Pallarés	30 May
Deportivo Anzoátegui	(Argentina) Nicolás Larcamón	Signed by Deportes Antofagasta	12 June	4th, QF	(Venezuela) Charles López	8 July
Zamora	(Venezuela) Francesco Stifano	Resigned	15 June	3rd, QF	(Venezuela) Luis Vera	20 June
Torneo Clausura
Deportivo La Guaira	(Venezuela) Eduardo Saragó	Mutual consent	7 July	Pre-season	(Venezuela) Pedro Depablos	8 July
Deportivo JBL	(Colombia) José Cortina Henríquez	Sacked	13 July	Pre-season	(Colombia) Juan Escobar	13 July
Zulia	(Venezuela) Daniel Farías	Signed by The Strongest	15 August	15th	(Venezuela) Miguelángel Acosta	15 August
Zulia	(Venezuela) Miguelángel Acosta	End of caretaker spell	18 August	13th	(Venezuela) Carlos Maldonado	18 August
Zamora	(Venezuela) Luis Vera	Sacked	22 August	18th	(Venezuela) Alí Cañas	23 August
Deportivo JBL	(Colombia) Juan Escobar	Sacked	28 August	12th	(Venezuela) Frank Flores	28 August
Trujillanos	(Argentina) Cristian Ferlauto	Mutual consent	11 September	17th	(Argentina) Horacio Matuszyczk	11 September
Atlético Socopó	(Venezuela) Alberto Valencia	Sacked	18 September	16th	(Argentina) Fernando Capobianco	18 September
Deportivo Táchira	(Colombia) Santiago Escobar	Mutual consent	11 October	9th	(Venezuela) Francesco Stifano	11 October
Metropolitanos	(Venezuela) Rafael Santana	Mutual consent	3 November	9th	(Venezuela) Daniel de Oliveira	4 November
Carabobo	(Bolivia) Julio César Baldivieso	Sacked	3 December	3rd, SF	(Colombia) Wilson Gutiérrez	14 December
Aragua	(Venezuela) Antonio Franco	Sacked	11 December	17th	(Venezuela) José Manuel Rey	12 December

== Torneo Apertura ==
The Torneo Apertura was the first tournament of the season. The regular season started on 28 January and finished on 21 May 2017.

Pos	Team	Pld	W	D	L	GF	GA	GD	Pts	Qualification
1	Deportivo Táchira	17	10	6	1	30	15	+15	36	Advance to knockout stage
2	Carabobo	17	10	5	2	36	12	+24	35	Advance to knockout stage
3	Zamora	17	8	6	3	26	14	+12	30	Advance to knockout stage
4	Deportivo Anzoátegui	17	7	7	3	23	13	+10	28	Advance to knockout stage
5	Caracas	17	7	7	3	27	19	+8	28	Advance to knockout stage
6	Monagas	17	6	8	3	27	19	+8	26	Advance to knockout stage
7	Aragua	17	6	7	4	22	18	+4	25	Advance to knockout stage
8	Deportivo La Guaira	17	6	5	6	23	17	+6	23	Advance to knockout stage
9	Zulia	17	7	2	8	28	35	−7	23	
10	Mineros	17	6	4	7	30	36	−6	22	
11	Atlético Venezuela	17	6	3	8	22	27	−5	21	
12	Deportivo Lara	17	5	4	8	22	24	−2	19	
13	Trujillanos	17	4	7	6	17	21	−4	19	
14	Estudiantes de Mérida	17	4	6	7	16	21	−5	18	
15	Portuguesa	17	2	10	5	13	27	−14	16	
16	Metropolitanos	17	4	3	10	14	32	−18	15	
17	Deportivo JBL	17	4	2	11	17	31	−14	14	
18	Atlético Socopó	17	3	4	10	15	27	−12	13	

Source: Soccerway, FVF
Rules for classification: 1) Points; 2) Head-to-head match; 3) Goal difference; 4) Goals scored.

=== Results ===
Home \ Away	ARA	SOC	AVE	CBO	CAR	ANZ	JBL	DLG	LAR	TAC	ESM	MET	MIN	MON	POR	TRU	ZAM	ZUL
Aragua	—	1–1	—	—	2–1	0–0	1–0	2–1	1–1	—	—	—	—	0–0	1–1	—	—	5–0
Atlético Socopó	—	—	1–2	—	—	1–1	2–2	—	—	1–2	0–2	3–2	—	0–2	—	—	—	2–1
Atlético Venezuela	1–0	—	—	—	—	1–3	2–1	—	—	1–2	—	0–0	3–0 (Note: Match awarded 3–0 to Atlético Venezuela due to Mineros fielding the ineligible player Ángelo Peña. The original result was a 2–1 win for Atlético Venezuela.)	1–1	—	1–2	—	—
Carabobo	3–0	3–1	1–0	—	1–2	—	—	—	2–1	—	—	—	4–0	—	0–0	—	0–0	—
Caracas	—	0–0	3–1	—	—	2–2	4–1	1–0	—	—	—	—	1–1	—	—	4–0	1–1	—
Deportivo Anzoátegui	—	—	—	0–0	—	—	—	2–0	—	1–1	2–0	0–1	—	—	0–0	—	2–0	1–2
Deportivo JBL	—	—	—	0–4	—	0–1	—	1–0	—	1–2	1–1	2–1	—	2–1	—	—	—	1–3
Deportivo La Guaira	—	4–1	2–1	0–1	—	—	—	—	0–0	—	1–0	4–0	3–1	—	1–1	—	0–0	—
Deportivo Lara	—	1–0	2–3	—	1–3	0–2	1–0	—	—	—	—	2–0	—	—	6–0	1–1	1–0	—
Deportivo Táchira	2–1	—	—	1–0	2–0	—	—	2–2	4–1	—	—	—	2–4	—	1–1	—	0–0	—
Estudiantes de Mérida	1–1	—	1–1	2–3	1–2	—	—	—	2–1	1–4	—	—	2–0	0–0	—	0–0	—	—
Metropolitanos	0–2	—	—	0–5	1–1	—	—	—	—	0–1	3–1	—	—	—	1–1	1–0	0–3	1–0
Mineros	3–3	1–0	—	—	—	4–4	2–0	—	2–1	—	—	2–1	—	—	0–3 (Note: Match awarded 3–0 to Portuguesa due to Mineros fielding the ineligible player Ángelo Peña. The original result was a 1–0 win for Mineros.)	4–1	—	—
Monagas	—	—	—	3–3	1–1	1–0	—	1–1	2–0	1–1	—	4–1	4–3	—	—	—	—	3–4
Portuguesa	—	1–0	1–3	—	1–1	—	0–3	—	—	—	0–0	—	—	0–2	—	0–0	—	1–1
Trujillanos	0–1	1–2	—	1–1	—	0–2	4–1	2–1	—	0–0	—	—	—	0–0	—	—	—	3–0
Zamora	3–1	1–0	4–0	—	—	—	2–1	—	—	—	1–0	—	1–1	2–1	6–1	2–2	—	—
Zulia	—	—	3–1	1–5	3–0	—	—	1–3	2–2	0–3 (Note: Match awarded 3–0 to Deportivo Táchira due to Zulia fielding four foreign players at the same time. The original result was a 2–0 win for Zulia.)	1–2	—	3–2	—	—	—	3–0	—

Source: Asociación FUTVE
Legend: Blue = home team win; Yellow = draw; Red = away team win.

=== Knockout stage ===
Quarter-finals
4	Deportivo Anzoátegui	0	0	0
5	Caracas	1	0	1
1	Deportivo Táchira	2	2	4
8	Deportivo La Guaira	3	2	5
2	Carabobo	0	2	2
7	Aragua	1	0	1
3	Zamora	1	1	2
6	Monagas	3	3	6

Semi-finals
5	Caracas (p)	2	1	3 (4)
8	Deportivo La Guaira	1	2	3 (3)
2	Carabobo	0	1	1
6	Monagas (a)	0	1	1

Final
5	Caracas	0	2	2
6	Monagas (a)	1	1	2

==== Quarter-finals ====
Team 1	Agg.	Team 2	1st leg	2nd leg
Deportivo La Guaira	5–4	Deportivo Táchira	3–2	2–2
Caracas	1–0	Deportivo Anzoátegui	1–0	0–0
Aragua	1–2	Carabobo	1–0	0–2
Monagas	6–2	Zamora	3–1	3–1

===== First leg =====
26 May 2017	Caracas	1–0	Deportivo Anzoátegui	Caracas
15:00	E. Hernández 48'	Report		Stadium: Estadio Olímpico; Attendance: 2,708; Referee: Ángel Arteaga

27 May 2017	Deportivo La Guaira	3–2	Deportivo Táchira	Caracas
17:00	Aguilar 14'; D. González 66'; Azócar 78'	Report	Ramírez 39'; Benítez 72'	Stadium: Estadio Olímpico; Attendance: 3,847; Referee: Orlando Bracamonte

29 May 2017	Monagas	3–1	Zamora	Maturín
19:00	L. González 10'; Blondell 58', 69'	Report	Luis Vargas 37'	Stadium: Estadio Monumental; Attendance: 6,137; Referee: Juan Soto

4 June 2017	Aragua	1–0	Carabobo	Acarigua
15:30	O. García 29'	Report		Stadium: José Antonio Páez; Attendance: 0 Referee: Jesús Valenzuela
Note: The match, originally scheduled for 28 May 2017 at Estadio Olímpico Hermanos Ghersi Páez in Maracay, was suspended due to crowd disturbance.

===== Second leg =====
10 June 2017	Zamora	1–3 (2–6 agg.)	Monagas	Barinas
19:00	Clarke 6' (pen.)	Report	L. González 71' (pen.); Febles 79'; Blondell 83'	Stadium: Agustín Tovar; Attendance: 2,962; Referee: Marlón Escalante

11 June 2017	Deportivo Táchira	2–2 (4–5 agg.)	Deportivo La Guaira	San Cristóbal
17:00	J. R. Reyes 10'; J. González 64'	Report	Valoyes 26'; Meleán 82'	Stadium: Polideportivo de Pueblo Nuevo; Attendance: 9,650; Referee: Edixon España

11 June 2017	Carabobo	2–0 (2–1 agg.)	Aragua	Valencia
19:30	Cova 15'; Tobar 38' (pen.)	Report		Stadium: Misael Delgado; Attendance: 2,743; Referee: Eduardo Mármol

12 June 2017	Deportivo Anzoátegui	0–0 (0–1 agg.)	Caracas	Puerto La Cruz
15:30		Report		Stadium: José Antonio Anzoátegui; Attendance: 2,875; Referee: Randy Lugo

==== Semi-finals ====
Team 1	Agg.	Team 2	1st leg	2nd leg
Deportivo La Guaira	3–3 (3–4 p)	Caracas	1–2	2–1
Monagas	1–1 (a)	Carabobo	0–0	1–1

===== First leg =====
17 June 2017	Deportivo La Guaira	1–2	Caracas	Caracas
17:30	D. González 8'	Report	Farías 32' (pen.); Castro 71'	Stadium: Estadio Olímpico; Attendance: 7,246; Referee: José Argote

17 June 2017	Monagas	0–0	Carabobo	Maturín
20:00		Report		Stadium: Estadio Monumental; Attendance: 16,357; Referee: Kevin Sánchez

===== Second leg =====
21 June 2017	Caracas	1–2 (3–3 agg.) (4–3 p)	Deportivo La Guaira	Caracas
17:00	Farías 82'	Report	D. González 21'; Valoyes 50' (pen.)	Stadium: Estadio Olímpico; Attendance: 3,211; Referee: José Luis Hoyo
	Penalties
	Castro (penalty scored); Arrieta (penalty missed); E. Pernía (penalty scored); Rosa (penalty scored); Farías (penalty scored)		(penalty scored) Aguilar; (penalty missed) La Mantía; (penalty scored) Cásseres; (penalty missed) Azócar; (penalty scored) Tucker

21 June 2017	Carabobo	1–1 (1–1 agg.)	Monagas (a)	Valencia
19:30	Bandillo 42'	Report	Febles 3'	Stadium: Misael Delgado; Attendance: 11,440; Referee: Anderson Tovar

==== Final ====
25 June 2017
19:00

Monagas	1–0	Caracas
Barberi 47'	Report

Estadio Monumental, Maturín
Attendance: 31,235
Referee: Ángel Arteaga

2 July 2017
17:00

Caracas	2–1	Monagas
R. Hernández 35'; Farías 57'	Report	Blondell 51'

Estadio Olímpico, Caracas
Attendance: 19,405
Referee: Alexis Herrera

2–2 on aggregate. Monagas won on away goals.

=== Top goalscorers ===
Rank	Player	Club	Goals
1	(Venezuela) Edder Farías	Caracas	13
2	(Paraguay) Víctor Aquino	Deportivo Táchira	11
3	(Venezuela) Anthony Blondell	Monagas	10
4	(Venezuela) Juan García Reyes	Aragua	9
4	(Venezuela) Aquiles Ocanto	Carabobo	9
4	(Venezuela) Jesús Hernández	Deportivo Lara	9
4	(Venezuela) Luis González	Monagas	9
8	(Venezuela) Richard Blanco	Mineros	8
8	(Colombia) Zamir Valoyes	Deportivo La Guaira	8
8	(Colombia) Tommy Tobar	Carabobo	8

=== Top assists ===
Rank	Player	Club	Assists
1	(Venezuela) Yohandry Orozco	Zulia	10
2	(Venezuela) Aquiles Ocanto	Carabobo	7
3	(Venezuela) Evelio Hernández	Caracas	6
3	(Colombia) Zamir Valoyes	Deportivo La Guaira	6
5	(Paraguay) Víctor Aquino	Deportivo Táchira	5
5	(Venezuela) Eduard Bello	Carabobo	5
5	(Venezuela) Richard Blanco	Mineros	5
5	(Venezuela) Pedro Ramírez	Deportivo Táchira	5

=== Awards ===
==== Team of the Tournament ====
The Asociación FUTVE chose the team of the Torneo Apertura.

Position		Player	Club
GK	(Venezuela)	Beycker Velásquez	Deportivo Anzoátegui
RB	(Venezuela)	Samuel Barberi	Monagas
CB	(Argentina)	Lucas Trejo	Monagas
CB	(Venezuela)	Rubert Quijada	Caracas
LB	(Venezuela)	Óscar González	Monagas
DM	(Portugal)	Ricardo Martins	Deportivo Anzoátegui
RM	(Venezuela)	Luis González	Monagas
LM	(Venezuela)	Yohandry Orozco	Zulia
RW	(Venezuela)	Anthony Blondell	Monagas
LW	(Venezuela)	Aquiles Ocanto	Carabobo
CF	(Venezuela)	Edder Farías	Caracas
Coach	(Venezuela)	Jhonny Ferreira	Monagas

==== Player of the Tournament ====
The best player of Torneo Apertura was Monagas winger Anthony Blondell, chosen by the Asociación FUTVE.

== Torneo Clausura ==
The Torneo Clausura was the second tournament of the season. The regular season started on 15 July and finished on 29 October 2017.

Pos	Team	Pld	W	D	L	GF	GA	GD	Pts	Qualification
1	Deportivo Lara	17	10	6	1	25	11	+14	36	Advance to knockout stage
2	Mineros	17	10	4	3	28	12	+16	34	Advance to knockout stage
3	Carabobo	17	9	4	4	28	13	+15	31	Advance to knockout stage
4	Estudiantes de Mérida	17	7	7	3	21	18	+3	28	Advance to knockout stage
5	Monagas	17	8	3	6	23	20	+3	27	Advance to knockout stage
6	Caracas	17	8	1	8	20	20	0	25	Advance to knockout stage
7	Deportivo La Guaira	17	7	3	7	24	22	+2	24	Advance to knockout stage
8	Zamora	17	6	6	5	21	21	0	24	Advance to knockout stage
9	Metropolitanos	17	5	8	4	16	15	+1	23	
10	Deportivo Táchira	17	6	5	6	18	18	0	23	
11	Portuguesa	17	6	4	7	22	19	+3	22	
12	Zulia	17	6	3	8	19	21	−2	21	
13	Deportivo JBL	17	6	3	8	17	23	−6	21	
14	Trujillanos	17	6	3	8	16	24	−8	21	
15	Atlético Venezuela	17	3	6	8	17	25	−8	15	
16	Atlético Socopó	17	3	5	9	13	25	−12	14	
17	Aragua	17	3	5	9	12	24	−12	14	
18	Deportivo Anzoátegui (Note: Deportivo Anzoátegui were deducted 3 points.)	17	2	8	7	12	22	−10	11	

Source: Soccerway, FVF
Rules for classification: 1) Points; 2) Head-to-head match; 3) Goal difference; 4) Goals scored.

=== Results ===
Home \ Away	ARA	SOC	AVE	CBO	CAR	ANZ	JBL	DLG	LAR	TAC	ESM	MET	MIN	MON	POR	TRU	ZAM	ZUL
Aragua	—	—	1–2	0–1	—	—	—	—	—	1–0	2–2	2–1	1–0	—	—	0–1	1–1	—
Atlético Socopó	2–2	—	—	0–1	2–1	—	—	2–1	0–2	—	—	—	0–0	—	1–2	1–2	1–4	—
Atlético Venezuela	—	0–1	—	1–3	0–1	—	—	4–2	0–2	—	1–1	—	—	—	1–2	—	1–1	3–1
Carabobo	—	—	—	—	—	2–0	3–0	1–1	—	0–1	0–0	1–1	—	4–1	—	5–1	—	1–0
Caracas	3–0	—	—	2–0	—	—	—	—	0–2	1–1	1–2	0–2	—	2–0	2–1	—	—	2–1
Deportivo Anzoátegui	0–0	0–0	1–1	—	0–2	—	0–1	—	2–2	—	—	—	1–1	1–1	—	2–1	—	—
Deportivo JBL	1–0	1–1	0–0	—	2–0	—	—	—	0–0	—	—	—	0–3	—	3–1	0–1	3–1	—
Deportivo La Guaira	1–1	—	—	—	2–0	2–0	2–1	—	—	2–1	—	—	—	0–0	—	3–0	—	1–2
Deportivo Lara	2–0	—	—	0–3	—	—	—	1–0	—	3–0	3–3	—	0–0	2–0	—	—	—	2–1
Deportivo Táchira	—	0–0	2–0	—	—	3–2	4–1	—	—	—	0–0	1–1	—	1–2	—	2–1	—	0–1
Estudiantes de Mérida	—	1–0	—	—	—	1–0	2–0	1–3	—	—	—	2–0	—	—	0–0	—	0–0	3–1
Metropolitanos	—	2–1	1–1	—	—	0–0	1–2	2–1	0–0	—	—	—	2–1	0–2	—	—	—	—
Mineros	—	—	3–0	3–2	2–1	—	—	1–2	—	0–0	4–1	—	—	1–0	—	—	3–0	2–1
Monagas	1–0	3–1	2–1	—	—	—	2–1	—	—	—	3–1	—	—	—	4–1	1–1	0–1	—
Portuguesa	4–1	—	—	0–0	—	3–0	—	3–0	1–2	0–1	—	0–0	1–2	—	—	—	2–0	—
Trujillanos	—	—	1–1	—	3–2	—	—	—	0–1	—	0–1	1–1	0–2	—	1–0	—	0–2	—
Zamora	—	—	—	2–1	0–1	2–2	—	2–1	1–1	3–1	—	0–2	—	—	—	—	—	1–1
Zulia	2–0	3–0	—	—	—	0–1	2–1	—	—	—	—	0–0	—	2–1	1–1	0–2	—	—

Source: Asociación FUTVE
Legend: Blue = home team win; Yellow = draw; Red = away team win.

=== Knockout stage ===
Quarter-finals
1	Deportivo Lara	1	6	7
8	Zamora	1	2	3
4	Estudiantes de Mérida	1	0	1
5	Monagas	1	1	2
2	Mineros	1	2	3
7	Deportivo La Guaira	1	1	2
3	Carabobo	1	2	3
6	Caracas	0	0	0

Semi-finals
1	Deportivo Lara	0	3	3
5	Monagas	1	0	1
2	Mineros	0	1	1
3	Carabobo	0	0	0

Final
1	Deportivo Lara (p)	0	1	1 (4)
2	Mineros	1	0	1 (3)

==== Quarter-finals ====
Team 1	Agg.	Team 2	1st leg	2nd leg
Zamora	3–7	Deportivo Lara	1–1	2–6
Monagas	2–1	Estudiantes de Mérida	1–1	1–0
Deportivo La Guaira	2–3	Mineros	1–1	1–2
Caracas	0–3	Carabobo	0–1	0–2

===== First leg =====
4 November 2017	Deportivo La Guaira	1–1	Mineros	Caracas
15:00	C. González 33'	Report	M. Granados 10' (o.g.)	Stadium: Estadio Olímpico; Attendance: 3,524; Referee: Jesús Valenzuela

5 November 2017	Caracas	0–1	Carabobo	Caracas
15:30		Report	Bello 90+2'	Stadium: Estadio Olímpico; Attendance: 3,450; Referee: José Argote

5 November 2017	Monagas	1–1	Estudiantes de Mérida	Maturín
17:45	Blondell 27'	Report	J. Gómez 64'	Stadium: Estadio Monumental; Attendance: 4,378; Referee: Juan Soto

5 November 2017	Zamora	1–1	Deportivo Lara	Barinas
20:00	I. González 33'	Report	L. Gómez 56'	Stadium: Agustín Tovar; Attendance: 3,238; Referee: Marlón Escalante

===== Second leg =====
11 November 2017	Deportivo Lara	6–2 (7–3 agg.)	Zamora	Cabudare
15:30	Caraballo 32', 50'; Sierra 48', 82'; L. Gómez 70', 90+2'	Report	M. González 34'; S. Fernández 76'	Stadium: Estadio Metropolitano; Attendance: 5,399; Referee: Ramón Ortega

11 November 2017	Estudiantes de Mérida	0–1 (1–2 agg.)	Monagas	Mérida
17:45		Report	Trejo 90'	Stadium: Estadio Metropolitano; Attendance: 15,560; Referee: Anderson Tovar

12 November 2017	Mineros	2–1 (3–2 agg.)	Deportivo La Guaira	Ciudad Guayana
17:00	R. Blanco 9'; Castillo 89'	Report	Arteaga 78'	Stadium: Polideportivo Cachamay; Attendance: 6,824; Referee: Francisco López

12 November 2017	Carabobo	2–0 (3–0 agg.)	Caracas	Valencia
19:15	Núñez 37'; Tobar 53'	Report		Stadium: Misael Delgado; Attendance: 5,958; Referee: José Luis Hoyo

==== Semi-finals ====
Team 1	Agg.	Team 2	1st leg	2nd leg
Monagas	1–3	Deportivo Lara	1–0	0–3
Carabobo	0–1	Mineros	0–0	0–1

===== First leg =====
18 November 2017	Monagas	1–0	Deportivo Lara	Maturín
19:00	Blondell 45+1' (pen.)	Report		Stadium: Estadio Monumental; Attendance: 7,872; Referee: José Argote

19 November 2017	Carabobo	0–0	Mineros	Valencia
19:00		Report		Stadium: Misael Delgado; Attendance: 9,701; Referee: Eduardo Mármol

===== Second leg =====
25 November 2017	Mineros	1–0 (1–0 agg.)	Carabobo	Ciudad Guayana
17:00	N. Hernández 25'	Report		Stadium: Polideportivo Cachamay; Attendance: 14,661; Referee: Ángel Arteaga

26 November 2017	Deportivo Lara	3–0 (3–1 agg.)	Monagas	Cabudare
15:00	L. Gómez 39', 48'; J. González 90+5'	Report		Stadium: Estadio Metropolitano; Attendance: 15,847; Referee: Juan Soto

==== Final ====
3 December 2017
17:00

Mineros	1–0	Deportivo Lara
N. Hernández 68'	Report

Polideportivo Cachamay, Ciudad Guayana
Attendance: 24,786
Referee: Orlando Bracamonte

9 December 2017
15:00

Deportivo Lara	1–0	Mineros
J. González 18'	Report
Penalties
Sierra (penalty scored); J. González (penalty scored); L. Gómez (penalty missed); Manzano (penalty scored); Di Giorgi (penalty missed); H. Pernía (penalty scored)	4–3	(penalty missed) R. Blanco; (penalty scored) Escobar; (penalty missed) Pol; (penalty scored) Faría; (penalty scored) C. Ortiz; (penalty missed) Castillo

Estadio Metropolitano, Cabudare
Attendance: 29,184
Referee: Jesús Valenzuela

1–1 on aggregate. Deportivo Lara won 4–3 on penalties.

=== Top goalscorers ===
Rank	Player	Club	Goals
1	(Venezuela) Anthony Blondell	Monagas	13
2	(Colombia) Tommy Tobar	Carabobo	12
3	(Argentina) Lucas Gómez	Deportivo Lara	10
4	(Venezuela) Carlos Espinoza	Estudiantes de Mérida	9
4	(Argentina) Gustavo Britos	Metropolitanos	9
6	(Venezuela) Jesús González	Deportivo Lara	8
6	(Argentina) Tulio Etchemaite	Portuguesa	8
8	(Venezuela) Manuel Arteaga	Deportivo La Guaira	7
8	(Paraguay) Víctor Aquino	Deportivo Táchira	7
8	(Venezuela) Fernando Aristeguieta	Caracas	7

=== Awards ===
==== Team of the Tournament ====
The Asociación FUTVE chose the team of the Torneo Clausura.

Position		Player	Club
GK	(Venezuela)	Carlos Salazar	Deportivo Lara
RB	(Venezuela)	Ángel Faría	Mineros
CB	(Venezuela)	Anthonys Matos	Mineros
CB	(Venezuela)	Henri Pernía	Deportivo Lara
LB	(Venezuela)	Daniel Carrillo	Deportivo Lara
CM	(Venezuela)	Jesús Gómez	Estudiantes de Mérida
CM	(Colombia)	Carlos Sierra	Deportivo Lara
RM	(Venezuela)	José Caraballo	Deportivo Lara
LM	(Venezuela)	Brayan Hurtado	Mineros
CF	(Venezuela)	Anthony Blondell	Monagas
CF	(Colombia)	Tommy Tobar	Carabobo
Coach	(Venezuela)	Leonardo González	Deportivo Lara

==== Player of the Tournament ====
The best player of Torneo Clausura was Deportivo Lara goalkeeper Carlos Salazar, chosen by the Asociación FUTVE.

== Serie Final ==
The Serie Final is held between the champions of the Torneo Apertura and the Torneo Clausura to determine the champions of the season. The draw to determine the order of the legs was held on 4 December 2017.

=== First leg ===
13 December 2017
19:00

Monagas	0–1	Deportivo Lara
	Report	J. González 35'

Estadio Monumental, Maturín
Attendance: 23,177
Referee: Alexis Herrera

Monagas	Deportivo Lara

GK	22	(Venezuela) Alain Baroja
DF	6	(Venezuela) Samuel Barberi
DF	25	(Argentina) Joaquín Lencinas
DF	3	(Argentina) Lucas Trejo (c)
DF	19	(Venezuela) Óscar González
MF	8	(Venezuela) Javier García
MF	7	(Venezuela) Ángel Lezama		(substituted off) 77'
MF	21	(Venezuela) Vicente Rodríguez		(substituted off) 61'
FW	20	(Venezuela) Luis Guerra		(substituted off) 82'
FW	17	(Venezuela) Anthony Blondell	(yellow card) 63'
FW	16	(Venezuela) Christian Flores
Substitutes:
GK	1	(Venezuela) Ángel Hernández
MF	5	(Venezuela) Óscar Guillén
MF	23	(Venezuela) Agnel Flores
MF	30	(Venezuela) Ismael Romero		(substituted on) 82'
FW	9	(Argentina) Juan Zárate		(substituted on) 77'
FW	18	(Venezuela) César Martínez		(substituted on) 61'
FW	24	(Venezuela) Yohanner García
Manager:
(Venezuela) Jhonny Ferreira

GK	1	(Venezuela) Carlos Salazar	(yellow card) 78'
DF	2	(Venezuela) Leminger Bolívar
DF	26	(Venezuela) Giacomo Di Giorgi		(substituted off) 27'
DF	4	(Venezuela) Leonardo Aponte
DF	27	(Venezuela) Daniel Carrillo
MF	15	(Venezuela) Ricardo Andreutti (c)
MF	5	(Venezuela) Bernaldo Manzano		(substituted off) 13'
MF	29	(Venezuela) Manuel Godoy
MF	17	(Venezuela) Ely Valderrey
FW	9	(Argentina) Lucas Gómez
FW	18	(Venezuela) Jesús González		(substituted off) 76'
Substitutes:
GK	12	(Venezuela) Jesús Padrón
MF	11	(Venezuela) Oswaldo Chaurant		(substituted on) 27'
MF	14	(Colombia) Carlos Sierra		(substituted on) 13'
FW	8	(Venezuela) José Reyes
FW	20	(Argentina) José Michelena
FW	23	(Venezuela) José Caraballo		(substituted on) 76'
FW	76	(Venezuela) Freddy Vargas
Manager:
(Venezuela) Leonardo González

Assistant referees:
Jorge Urrego
Jairo Molina
Fourth official:
Adrián Cabello

Match rules

- 90 minutes.
- Seven named substitutes, of which up to three may be used.

=== Second leg ===
17 December 2017
15:00

Deportivo Lara	0–2	Monagas
	Report	Blondell 36'; Ag. Flores 80'

Estadio Metropolitano, Cabudare
Attendance: 31,028
Referee: José Argote

Monagas won 2–1 on aggregate.

Deportivo Lara	Monagas

GK	1	(Venezuela) Carlos Salazar
DF	2	(Venezuela) Leminger Bolívar		(substituted off) 83'
DF	4	(Venezuela) Leonardo Aponte
DF	13	(Venezuela) Henri Pernía (c)
DF	27	(Venezuela) Daniel Carrillo		(substituted off) 65'
MF	28	(Venezuela) Jesús Bueno
MF	23	(Venezuela) José Caraballo	(yellow card) 45'
MF	14	(Colombia) Carlos Sierra
MF	8	(Venezuela) José Reyes		(substituted off) 70'
FW	18	(Venezuela) Jesús González
FW	9	(Argentina) Lucas Gómez
Substitutes:
GK	12	(Venezuela) Jesús Padrón
MF	11	(Venezuela) Oswaldo Chaurant		(substituted on) 65'
MF	15	(Venezuela) Ricardo Andreutti
FW	17	(Venezuela) Ely Valderrey		(substituted on) 70'
FW	20	(Argentina) José Michelena		(substituted on) 83'
FW	29	(Venezuela) Manuel Godoy
FW	76	(Venezuela) Freddy Vargas
Manager:
(Venezuela) Leonardo González

GK	22	(Venezuela) Alain Baroja
DF	15	(Venezuela) Edwar Bracho	(yellow card) 50'	(substituted off) 61'
DF	25	(Argentina) Joaquín Lencinas
DF	3	(Argentina) Lucas Trejo (c)
DF	19	(Venezuela) Óscar González	(yellow card) 74'
MF	8	(Venezuela) Javier García
MF	14	(Colombia) Dáger Palacios	(yellow card) 6'	(substituted off) 89'
MF	16	(Venezuela) Christian Flores
FW	20	(Venezuela) Luis Guerra		(substituted off) 76'
FW	27	(Venezuela) Anthony Blondell	(yellow card) 26'
FW	24	(Venezuela) Yohanner García	(yellow card) 65'
Substitutes:
GK	1	(Venezuela) Ángel Hernández
DF	6	(Venezuela) Samuel Barberi
MF	7	(Venezuela) Ángel Lezama
MF	21	(Venezuela) Vicente Rodríguez		(substituted on) 89'
MF	23	(Venezuela) Agnel Flores		(substituted on) 76'
MF	30	(Venezuela) Ismael Romero		(substituted on) 61'
FW	18	(Venezuela) César Martínez
Manager:
(Venezuela) Jhonny Ferreira

Assistant referees:
Carlos López
Luis Sánchez
Fourth official:
Yersinia Correa

Match rules

- 90 minutes.
- If the aggregate score is level, the away goals rule is used to determine the winner.
- Penalty shoot-out if the tie persists.
- Seven named substitutes, of which up to three may be used.

Primera División
2017 Champions
Monagas
1st title

== Aggregate table ==
Pos	Team	Pld	W	D	L	GF	GA	GD	Pts	Qualification or relegation
1	Carabobo	34	19	9	6	64	25	+39	66	Qualification to Copa Libertadores second stage
2	Deportivo Táchira	34	16	11	7	48	33	+15	59	Qualification to Copa Libertadores first stage
3	Mineros	34	16	8	10	58	48	+10	56	Qualification to Copa Sudamericana first stage (Note: Mineros qualified for the Copa Sudamericana first stage as 2017 Copa Venezuela champions.)
4	Deportivo Lara	34	15	10	9	47	35	+12	55	Qualification to Copa Libertadores group stage
5	Zamora	34	14	12	8	47	36	+11	54	Qualification to Copa Sudamericana first stage (Note: Zamora qualified for the Copa Sudamericana first stage as aggregate table best team not yet qualified for South American competition.)
6	Monagas (C)	34	14	11	9	50	39	+11	53	Qualification to Copa Libertadores group stage
7	Caracas	34	15	8	11	48	39	+9	53	Qualification to Copa Sudamericana first stage (Note: Caracas qualified for the Copa Sudamericana first stage as Apertura runners-up.)
8	Deportivo La Guaira	34	13	8	13	47	39	+8	47	
9	Estudiantes de Mérida	34	11	13	10	37	39	−2	46	Qualification to Copa Sudamericana first stage (Note: Estudiantes de Mérida qualified for the Copa Sudamericana first stage as Clausura classification table best team not yet qualified for South American competition, since Clausura runners-up Mineros qualified for a higher berth.)
10	Zulia	34	13	5	16	47	56	−9	44	
11	Trujillanos	34	10	10	14	33	45	−12	40	
12	Deportivo Anzoátegui (Note: Deportivo Anzoátegui were deducted 3 points.)	34	9	15	10	35	35	0	39	
13	Aragua	34	9	12	13	34	42	−8	39	
14	Portuguesa	34	8	14	12	35	49	−14	38	
15	Metropolitanos	34	9	11	14	30	47	−17	38	
16	Atlético Venezuela	34	9	9	16	39	52	−13	36	
17	Deportivo JBL (R)	34	10	5	19	35	54	−19	35	Relegation to Segunda División
18	Atlético Socopó (R)	34	6	9	19	28	52	−24	27	Relegation to Segunda División

Source: FVF
Rules for classification: 1) Points; 2) Goal difference; 3) Goals scored.
(C) Champions; (R) Relegated

== Awards ==
=== Torneo Apertura ===
==== Player of the Matchday ====
Day	Player	Club	Reference
12	(Venezuela) Jairo Otero	Atlético Venezuela	
13	(Venezuela) Aquiles Ocanto	Carabobo	
14	(Venezuela) Darwin González	Deportivo La Guaira	
15	(Venezuela) Jesús Vargas	Estudiantes de Mérida	
16	(Venezuela) Argenis Gómez	Mineros	
17	(Portugal) Ricardo Martins	Deportivo Anzoátegui	

=== Monthly awards ===
Month	Player of the Month		Reference
Month	Player	Club	Reference
April	(Venezuela) Aquiles Ocanto	Carabobo	

=== Torneo Clausura ===
==== Player of the Matchday ====
Day	Player	Club	Reference
1	(Mexico) Luz Rodríguez	Estudiantes de Mérida	
2	(Colombia) Tommy Tobar	Carabobo	
3	(Venezuela) Manuel Arteaga	Deportivo La Guaira	
4	(Venezuela) Anthony Blondell	Monagas	
6	(Argentina) Gustavo Britos	Metropolitanos	
7	(Venezuela) Brayan Hurtado	Mineros	
8	(Venezuela) Carlos Espinoza	Estudiantes de Mérida	
9	(Venezuela) Richard Blanco	Mineros	
10	(Venezuela) Christian Novoa	Carabobo	
11	(Colombia) Jhoan Mina	Atlético Socopó	
14	(Venezuela) Anthony Uribe	Zamora	
15	(Colombia) Tommy Tobar	Carabobo	
16	(Venezuela) Jesús González	Deportivo Lara	
QF1	(Venezuela) Eduard Bello	Carabobo	
QF2	(Colombia) Jeysen Núñez	Carabobo	
SF1	(Venezuela) Anthony Blondell	Monagas	
SF2	(Argentina) Lucas Gómez	Deportivo Lara	

=== Annual awards ===
==== Player of the Year ====
The best player of the 2017 season was Monagas forward Anthony Blondell, chosen by the Asociación FUTVE.

==== Team of the Year ====
The Asociación FUTVE chose the team of the season.

Position		Player	Club
GK	(Venezuela)	Carlos Salazar	Deportivo Lara
RB	(Venezuela)	Alejandro Fuenmayor	Carabobo
CB	(Argentina)	Lucas Trejo	Monagas
LB	(Venezuela)	Óscar González	Monagas
DM	(Venezuela)	Francisco Flores	Mineros
DM	(Venezuela)	Javier García	Monagas
RM	(Venezuela)	Eduard Bello	Carabobo
CM	(Venezuela)	Charlis Ortiz	Mineros
LM	(Venezuela)	Brayan Hurtado	Mineros
CF	(Colombia)	Tommy Tobar	Carabobo
CF	(Venezuela)	Anthony Blondell	Monagas
Coach	(Venezuela)	Jhonny Ferreira	Monagas
