= 1999 in association football =

The following are the association football events of the year 1999 throughout the world.

== Events ==
- Manchester United won the UEFA Champions League, FA Cup and Premiership to cap off an unprecedented European Treble.
- 1999 Copa Libertadores: Won by Palmeiras after defeating Deportivo Cali 4–3 on a penalty shootout after a final aggregate score of 2–2.
- FIFA Women's World Cup – United States won 0–0, 5–4 on penalty kicks, over China
- Confederations Cup – Mexico won the tournament after beating Brazil 4–3
- March 14 – New J.League Division 2 (J2) season started with ten clubs, one relegated from previous season's J.League and nine promoted from former Japan Football League.
- May 22 – Manchester United wins the FA Cup with a 2–0 win over Newcastle United. The goals are scored by Teddy Sheringham and Paul Scholes.
- August 8 – Feyenoord wins the Johan Cruyff Shield, the annual opening of the new season in the Eredivisie, by a 3–2 win over Ajax at the Amsterdam Arena.
- September 11 – Manager Hans Meyer from Germany resigns at Dutch club Twente, and is replaced by former player Fred Rutten.
- October 27 – Dutch club Sparta Rotterdam fires manager Jan Everse, who is replaced by Dolf Roks.
- October 30 – Manager Herbert Neumann is fired at Dutch club Vitesse. Ronald Koeman will replace him on 1 January 2000. In the meantime former player Edward Sturing takes control.
- November 5 – Italy's Veneto wins the first UEFA Regions' Cup, beating Spain's Madrid 3–2, after extra time, in Abano Terme.
- November 30 – Manchester United wins the Intercontinental Cup in Tokyo by defeating Brazil's Palmeiras: 1–0. The only goal for the English club is scored by Roy Keane in the 35th minute.
- December 29 – Manager Jimmy Calderwood leaves Dutch club NEC and is succeeded by former player Ron de Groot.

== Winners national club championship ==
=== Asia ===
- Japan – Júbilo Iwata
- Qatar – Al-Wakrah
- South Korea – Suwon Samsung Bluewings

=== Europe ===
- Croatia – Croatia Zagreb
- Czech Republic – Sparta Prague
- England – Manchester United
- Finland - Haka Valkeakoski
- France – Bordeaux
- Germany – Bayern Munich
- Iceland – KR
- Italy – A.C. Milan
- Netherlands – Feyenoord
- Portugal – Porto
- Scotland – Rangers
- Spain – Barcelona
- Turkey – Galatasaray
- FR Yugoslavia – Partizan

=== North America ===
- Canada – Toronto Olympians (CPSL)
- Mexico
  - Verano – Toluca
  - Invierno – Pachuca
- United States – D.C. United (MLS)

=== South America ===
- Argentina
  - Clausura – Boca Juniors
  - Apertura – River Plate
- Bolivia – Blooming
- Brazil – Corinthians
- Chile – Universidad de Chile
- Ecuador – LDU Quito
- Paraguay – Olimpia Asunción
- Peru – Universitario de Deportes

== International tournaments ==
- UNCAF Nations Cup in San José, Costa Rica (March 17–28, 1999)
  1. Costa Rica
  2. Guatemala
  3. Honduras
- Canada Cup in Edmonton, Alberta, Canada (June 2–6, 1999)
  1. Ecuador
  2. Iran
  3. Canada
- Copa América in Paraguay (June 29 – July 18, 1999)
  1. Brazil
  2. Uruguay
  3. Mexico
- Pan American Games in Winnipeg, Manitoba, Canada (July 23 – August 7, 1999)
  - Men's Tournament
  1. Mexico
  2. Honduras
  3. United States
  - Women's Tournament
  1. United States
  2. Mexico
  3. Costa Rica
- FIFA U-20 World Cup in Nigeria (April 3–24, 1999)
  1. Spain
  2. Japan
  3. Mali
- FIFA U-17 World Championship in New Zealand (November 10–27, 1999)
  1. Brazil
  2. Australia
  3. Ghana

== Births ==
- 1 January: Gianluca Scamacca, Italian footballer
- 5 January: Mattias Svanberg, Swedish footballer
- 9 January: Maximiliano Romero, Argentinian footballer
- 12 January: Tyler Roberts, Welsh footballer
- 15 January: Kingsley Agbodike, Nigerian footballer
- 16 January: Joe White, English footballer
- 18 January: Patrice Sousia, Cameroonian footballer
- 19 January:
  - Donyell Malen, Dutch footballer
  - Valentino Müller, Austrian footballer
- 23 January:
  - Alban Lafont, Ivorian footballer
  - Malang Sarr, French footballer
- 24 January: Shan Huanhuan, Chinese footballer
- 30 January: Junior Etoundi, French footballer
- 4 February: Mohammad Soltani Mehr, Iranian footballer
- 17 February: Oscar Krusnell, Swedish footballer
- 25 February: Gianluigi Donnarumma, Italian international goalkeeper
- 18 March: Diogo Dalot, Portuguese international footballer
- 29 March: Ezequiel Barco, Argentinian footballer
- 31 March: Jens Odgaard, Danish footballer
- 4 April: Aldhair Molina, Mexican footballer
- 14 April: Matteo Guendouzi, French footballer
- 16 April: Caio Felipe, Brazilian footballer
- 17 April: Matteo Perrotti, Italian footballer
- 20 April: Johao Martínez, Venezuelan footballer
- 24 April: Jonathan Leko, English footballer
- 1 May: Edriss Hushmand, Swedish footballer
- 7 May: Cody Gakpo, Dutch footballer
- 14 May: William Tønning, Danish footballer
- 25 May: Ibrahima Konaté, French footballer
- 3 June: Dan-Axel Zagadou, French footballer
- 10 June: Rafael Leão, Portuguese footballer
- 11 June: Kai Havertz, German international
- 15 June: Luis Simigliani, Venezuelan footballer
- 23 June: Linton Maina, German footballer
- 24 June: Darwin Núñez, Uruguayan international
- 2 July: Nicolò Zaniolo, Italian international
- 4 July: Jessy Caicedo, Ecuadorian footballer
- 3 August: Brahim Díaz, Spanish-Moroccan footballer
- 12 August: Matthijs de Ligt, Dutch international
- 5 October: Connor McLennan, Scottish youth international
- 15 October: Ben Woodburn, Welsh international
- 7 November: Luis González, Venezuelan footballer
- 10 November: João Félix, Portuguese international
- 18 November: Domingos Quina, Portuguese footballer
- 4 December: Tahith Chong, Dutch footballer
- 10 December: Reiss Nelson, English footballer

== Deaths ==
=== January ===
- January 6 – Ottavio Misefari (89), Italian footballer
- January 6 – Lajos Tichy (63), Hungarian footballer
- January 18 – Horace Cumner (80), Welsh footballer

=== March ===
- March 30 – Igor Netto (69), Soviet footballer

=== April ===
- April 28 – Sir Alfred Ramsey (79), English footballer and manager

=== July ===
- July 20– Abderrahmane Boubekeur, Algerian goalkeeper, former player of AS Monaco FC, the FLN football team and the Algeria national football team. (68)
- July 28 – Carlos Romero, Uruguayan forward, winner of the 1950 FIFA World Cup. (71)

=== August ===
- August 23 – Georges Boulogne (81), French footballer

=== November ===
- November 14 – Bert Jacobs (58), Dutch footballer and manager
