= 2016 Venezuelan Primera División season =

Liga Movistar
- Season: 2016
- Champions: Zamora (3rd title)
- Relegated: Ureña; Llaneros; Petare; Estudiantes de Caracas
- 2017 Copa Libertadores: Zamora; Zulia; Carabobo; Deportivo Táchira
- 2016 Copa Sudamericana: Deportivo Anzoátegui
- 2017 Copa Sudamericana: Estudiantes de Caracas (cup runner-up); Atlético Venezuela; Caracas; Deportivo Anzoátegui
- Top goalscorer: Gabriel Torres (22 goals)

The 2016 Primera División season was the 35th professional season of Venezuela's top-flight football league.

== Teams ==
Locations of the 2016 Primera División teams

Team	City	Stadium
Aragua	Maracay	Olímpico Hermanos Ghersi Páez
Atlético Venezuela	Caracas	Brígido Iriarte
Carabobo	Valencia	Misael Delgado
Caracas	Caracas	Olímpico de la UCV; Cocodrilos Sports Park^{a}
Deportivo Anzoátegui	Puerto La Cruz	José Antonio Anzoátegui
Deportivo JBL	Maracaibo	José "Pachencho" Romero
Deportivo La Guaira	Caracas	Olímpico de la UCV; Metropolitano de Cabudare^{a}
Deportivo Lara	Cabudare	Metropolitano de Cabudare
Deportivo Táchira	San Cristóbal	Polideportivo de Pueblo Nuevo
Estudiantes de Caracas	Caracas	Brígido Iriarte
Estudiantes de Mérida	Mérida	Metropolitano de Mérida
Llaneros	Guanare	Rafael Calles Pinto
Mineros	Ciudad Guayana	Polideportivo Cachamay
Monagas	Maturín	Monumental de Maturín
Petare	Caracas	Olímpico de la UCV; Cocodrilos Sports Park^{a}
Portuguesa	Acarigua	General José Antonio Paez
Trujillanos	Valera	José Alberto Pérez
Ureña	Ureña	Polideportivo de Pueblo Nuevo
Zamora	Barinas	Agustín Tovar
Zulia	Maracaibo	José "Pachencho" Romero

a: Used for most of the Torneo Clausura as home stadium due to remodeling works at Estadio Olímpico de la UCV.

== Torneo Apertura ==
The Torneo Apertura was the first tournament of the season. It began in January 2016 and ended in May 2016.

=== Standings ===
Pos	Team	Pld	W	D	L	GF	GA	GD	Pts	Qualification
1	Zamora	19	12	4	3	39	18	+21	40	Quarterfinals
2	Deportivo Táchira	19	11	5	3	27	13	+14	38	Quarterfinals
3	Deportivo Anzoátegui	19	8	8	3	25	23	+2	32	Quarterfinals
4	Mineros	19	8	6	5	38	27	+11	30	Quarterfinals
5	Caracas	19	7	9	3	23	15	+8	30	Quarterfinals
6	Deportivo La Guaira	19	8	6	5	28	22	+6	30	Quarterfinals
7	Aragua	19	7	8	4	27	22	+5	29	Quarterfinals
8	Trujillanos	19	7	8	4	22	17	+5	29	Quarterfinals
9	Zulia	19	7	7	5	25	21	+4	28	
10	Carabobo	19	7	6	6	27	22	+5	27	
11	Deportivo Lara	19	7	5	7	25	22	+3	26	
12	Deportivo JBL	19	8	2	9	23	20	+3	26	
13	Ureña	19	6	5	8	20	25	−5	23	
14	Estudiantes de Mérida	19	7	1	11	20	35	−15	22	
15	Portuguesa	19	3	10	6	17	21	−4	19	
16	Atlético Venezuela	19	4	7	8	22	28	−6	19	
17	Monagas	19	4	5	10	15	31	−16	17	
18	Llaneros	19	3	7	9	12	25	−13	16	
19	Petare	19	3	6	10	11	24	−13	15	
20	Estudiantes de Caracas	19	2	7	10	19	34	−15	13	

Updated to match(es) played on 7 May 2016. Source: FVF, Soccerway
Rules for classification: 1) points; 2) goal difference; 3) number of goals scored.

=== Results ===
Home \ Away	ARA	AVE	CBO	CRC	DAN	JBL	DLG	LAR	DTA	ECA	EME	LLA	MGU	MON	PET	POR	TRU	URE	ZAM	ZUL
Aragua		3–3	2–2			0–2	1–0	2–0	2–0					0–0					2–2	
Atlético Venezuela				0–0	0–1		1–2			0–0	2–1		1–1		1–0			1–2	2–2	
Carabobo		2–1		1–0	2–0		1–1			3–0	2–1		0–1	4–0		0–0			3–2	
Caracas	1–0				1–1					2–0	2–3		2–2		2–1		1–1	2–1		1–0
Deportivo Anzoátegui	2–2					1–0		2–1	1–1			3–1			1–1	1–0	1–1	0–0		2–2
Deportivo JBL		4–1	3–1	2–1			2–1			2–2	1–2		0–1	1–0		0–0			1–2	
Deportivo La Guaira				0–0	1–1					2–1	3–1		2–1		3–1		2–0	1–1		3–2
Deportivo Lara		3–0	3–2	1–1		2–1	2–1			4–1			1–3	2–0		1–1			3–1	
Deportivo Táchira		2–1	1–1	1–1		1–0	2–1	0–0					1–0	3–0		1–1			1–2	
Estudiantes de Caracas	2–3				2–3				0–1		3–2	1–1			2–2	1–0	1–1	1–3		0–2
Estudiantes de Mérida	1–0				1–2			2–1	1–4			1–0			1–0	1–2	0–1	2–1		0–2
Llaneros	1–1	0–3	2–0	0–1		1–0	1–1	1–0	0–2					0–1					0–0	
Mineros	1–2				4–1					1–1	0–0	5–2			6–1	1–1	2–3	4–3		2–2
Monagas		2–3		0–4	0–2		1–3			0–0	4–0		1–3		1–0				0–3	
Petare	0–1		1–1			1–0		0–0	0–1			1–0				0–3	0–0	2–0		0–0
Portuguesa	2–2	2–1		0–0			1–1					2–2		0–0			0–3	0–2	1–2	1–2
Trujillanos	1–1	0–0	1–1			1–2		1–0	1–0			3–0		1–1						2–1
Ureña	0–2		2–1			2–1		0–0	0–2			0–0		0–2			1–0			1–1
Zamora				1–1	3–0		2–0			2–1	5–0		3–0		1–0		3–1	3–1		
Zulia	2–1	1–1	1–0			0–1		3–1	1–3			0–0		2–2					1–0	

Updated to match(es) played on 7 May 2016. Source: Soccerway
Legend: Blue = home team win; Yellow = draw; Red = away team win.

=== Knockout bracket ===
Quarterfinals
1	Zamora (a)	3	0	3
8	Trujillanos	2	1	3
4	Deportivo La Guaira	1	0	1
5	Caracas	2	1	3
3	Deportivo Anzoátegui	1	3	4
6	Mineros	0	1	1
2	Deportivo Táchira	0	2	2
7	Aragua	1	2	3

Semifinals
1	Zamora	2	2	4
5	Caracas	0	0	0
3	Deportivo Anzoátegui	1	6	7
7	Aragua	1	0	1

Finals
1	Zamora	1	3	4
3	Deportivo Anzoátegui	1	1	2

=== Top goalscorers ===
Rank	Name	Club	Goals
1	(Panama) Gabriel Torres	Zamora	15
2	(Venezuela) Johan Arrieche	Mineros	11
3	(Venezuela) Richard Blanco	Mineros	8
3	(Panama) Miguel Camargo	Mineros	8
3	(Venezuela) Juan García	Estudiantes de Caracas	8
3	(Venezuela) Aquiles Ocanto	Carabobo	8
3	(Colombia) Víctor Rentería	Ureña	8
3	(Venezuela) José Miguel Reyes	Deportivo Táchira	8

Source: Soccerway

== Torneo Clausura ==
The Torneo Clausura will be the second tournament of the season. It began in July 2016 and will end in December 2016.

=== Standings ===
Pos	Team	Pld	W	D	L	GF	GA	GD	Pts	Qualification
1	Carabobo	19	13	3	3	37	15	+22	42	Quarterfinals
2	Atlético Venezuela	19	10	5	4	29	18	+11	35	Quarterfinals
3	Monagas	19	10	3	6	33	23	+10	33	Quarterfinals
4	Caracas	19	8	7	4	36	19	+17	31	Quarterfinals
5	Deportivo La Guaira	19	8	6	5	29	19	+10	30	Quarterfinals
6	Deportivo Táchira	19	9	3	7	22	26	−4	30	Quarterfinals
7	Zulia	19	7	8	4	30	21	+9	29	Quarterfinals
8	Deportivo Lara	19	9	2	8	21	21	0	29	Quarterfinals
9	Deportivo Anzoátegui	19	9	2	8	25	25	0	29	
10	Estudiantes de Mérida	19	8	4	7	21	25	−4	28	
11	Zamora	19	8	3	8	29	20	+9	27	
12	Portuguesa	19	5	9	5	23	20	+3	24	
13	Aragua	19	6	4	9	21	27	−6	22	
14	Mineros	19	4	9	6	23	25	−2	21	
15	Deportivo JBL	19	5	5	9	20	19	+1	20	
16	Trujillanos	19	4	7	8	23	32	−9	19	
17	Llaneros	19	4	6	9	19	33	−14	18	
18	Estudiantes de Caracas	19	5	3	11	13	32	−19	18	
19	Ureña	19	4	6	9	21	41	−20	18	
20	Petare	19	4	5	10	15	29	−14	17	

Updated to match(es) played on 23 October 2016. Source: FVF, Soccerway
Rules for classification: 1) points; 2) goal difference; 3) number of goals scored.

=== Results ===
Home \ Away	ARA	AVE	CBO	CRC	DAN	JBL	DLG	LAR	DTA	ECA	EME	LLA	MGU	MON	PET	POR	TRU	URE	ZAM	ZUL
Aragua				2–1	0–1					2–2	1–0	4–1	2–4		1–1	0–0	2–0	1–0		2–3
Atlético Venezuela	1–2		1–0			2–1		3–2	3–0			1–0		1–2		2–0	1–1			2–1
Carabobo	4–1					2–0		1–0	3–0			3–1			2–1		1–0	1–1		4–2
Caracas		1–1	3–3			0–2	2–0	0–0	3–0			3–0		4–1		1–1			0–0	
Deportivo Anzoátegui		1–0	0–3	1–3			0–1			2–0	1–1		2–0	2–1					2–1	
Deportivo JBL	0–0				1–2			0–1	0–1			0–0			3–0		3–0	3–0		0–0
Deportivo La Guaira	1–0	3–3	1–0			1–0		1–2	2–1			2–0		0–2		0–0			1–1	
Deportivo Lara	1–0				1–0				0–2		1–0	4–1			0–2		1–2	1–2		1–0
Deportivo Táchira	2–0				2–0					1–0	0–0	2–0			2–0		3–2	2–1		1–1
Estudiantes de Caracas		1–1	1–1	1–0		1–0	0–4	0–1					1–0	0–2					0–1	
Estudiantes de Mérida		1–0	0–2	2–5		2–1	2–1			4–1			1–0	0–1					1–0	
Llaneros					1–0					4–0	2–0		1–1		2–1	1–1	1–1	2–2		1–1
Mineros		1–2	1–2	1–0		4–2	2–2	3–1	1–1					1–1					1–4	
Monagas	2–1		0–3			1–1		1–1	4–0			6–1				2–1	2–1	4–1		0–1
Petare		0–3		0–2	1–3		1–0			0–1	0–0		0–0	2–1					3–2	
Portuguesa			2–1		3–2	1–1		1–2	3–1	4–1	2–2		0–0		2–0					
Trujillanos				1–5	1–1		2–2			2–3	1–3		0–0		1–1	3–2		2–0	2–0	
Ureña		1–1		1–1	1–5		0–6			2–0	1–2		2–2		2–0	0–0			2–7	
Zamora	3–0	0–1	0–1			1–2		2–1	3–1			1–0		2–0		0–0				1–2
Zulia				2–2	4–0		1–1			1–0	5–0		1–1		2–2	1–0	1–1	1–2		

Updated to match(es) played on 23 October 2016. Source: Soccerway
Legend: Blue = home team win; Yellow = draw; Red = away team win.

=== Knockout bracket ===
Quarterfinals
2	Atlético Venezuela	3	0	3
7	Deportivo Lara	0	1	1
3	Monagas	1	1	2
6	Deportivo Táchira	2	1	3
4	Caracas	2	1	3
5	Deportivo La Guaira	0	0	0
1	Carabobo	0	0	0
8	Zulia	3	0	3

Semifinals
2	Atlético Venezuela	0	2	2
6	Deportivo Táchira	3	0	3
4	Caracas	0	1	1
8	Zulia	1	2	3

Finals
6	Deportivo Táchira	0	2	2 (6)
8	Zulia (p)	2	0	2 (7)

=== Top goalscorers ===
Rank	Name	Club	Goals
1	(Venezuela) Edder Farías	Caracas	12
2	(Venezuela) Armando Maita	Monagas	10
3	(Venezuela) Christian Novoa	Carabobo	9
3	(Venezuela) Jefferson Savarino	Zulia	9
4	(Venezuela) Richard Blanco	Zamora	8
4	(Venezuela) Reiner Castro	Caracas	8
4	(Venezuela) Joel Infante	Atlético Venezuela	8
4	(Venezuela) Charlis Ortiz	Deportivo Anzoátegui	8
4	(Mexico) Luz Rodríguez	Estudiantes de Mérida	8

Source: Soccerway

== Serie Final ==
4 December 2016
19:19

Zamora	2–1	Zulia
Martínez 39'; Osorio 55'	Report	Guaycochea 8'

Estadio Agustín Tovar, Barinas
Attendance: 15,580
Referee: Alexis Herrera

11 December 2016
15:00

Zulia	1–2	Zamora
Unrein 18'	Report	Blanco 51'; Martínez 59'

Estadio José Pachencho Romero, Maracaibo
Attendance: 37,674
Referee: Juan Soto

Zamora won 4–2 on aggregate.

== Aggregate table ==
Pos	Team	Pld	W	D	L	GF	GA	GD	Pts	Qualification or relegation
1	Carabobo	38	20	9	9	64	37	+27	69	2017 Copa Libertadores Second Stage
2	Deportivo Táchira	38	20	8	10	49	39	+10	68	2017 Copa Libertadores First Stage
3	Zamora (C)	38	20	7	11	68	38	+30	67	2017 Copa Libertadores Group Stage
4	Caracas	38	15	16	7	59	34	+25	61	2017 Copa Sudamericana First Stage
5	Deportivo Anzoátegui	38	17	10	11	50	48	+2	61	2016 Copa Sudamericana First Stage and 2017 Copa Sudamericana First Stage
6	Deportivo La Guaira	38	16	12	10	57	41	+16	60	
7	Zulia	38	14	15	9	55	42	+13	57	2017 Copa Libertadores Group Stage
8	Deportivo Lara	38	16	7	15	46	43	+3	55	
9	Atlético Venezuela	38	14	12	12	51	46	+5	54	2017 Copa Sudamericana First Stage
10	Mineros	38	12	15	11	61	52	+9	51	
11	Aragua	38	13	12	13	48	49	−1	51	
12	Monagas	38	14	8	16	48	54	−6	50	
13	Estudiantes de Mérida	38	15	5	18	41	60	−19	50	
14	Trujillanos	38	11	15	12	45	49	−4	48	
15	Deportivo JBL	38	13	7	18	43	39	+4	46	
16	Portuguesa	38	8	19	11	40	41	−1	43	
17	Ureña (R)	38	10	11	17	41	66	−25	41	Relegation to Venezuelan Segunda División
18	Llaneros (R)	38	7	13	18	31	58	−27	34	Relegation to Venezuelan Segunda División
19	Petare (R)	38	7	11	20	26	53	−27	32	Relegation to Venezuelan Segunda División
20	Estudiantes de Caracas (Note: Estudiantes de Caracas are qualified for the 2017 Copa Sudamericana as Copa Venezuela runners-up.) (R)	38	7	10	21	32	66	−34	31	2017 Copa Sudamericana First Stage and relegation to Venezuelan Segunda División

Updated to match(es) played on 23 October 2016. Source: FVF
Rules for classification: 1) points; 2) goal difference; 3) number of goals scored.
(C) Champions; (R) Relegated

== Best of the Year ==
The Uruguayan newspaper El País chose the best player, manager and club of the 2016 season.

- Player of the Year: Jefferson Savarino.
- Manager of the Year: Francesco Stifano.
- Club of the Year: Zamora FC.

== Team of the Year ==
The newly formed AUFP chose the team of the year.

Position		Player	Club
GK	(Venezuela)	Wuilker Faríñez	Caracas
RB	(Venezuela)	Giovanny Romero	Zulia
CB	(Venezuela)	Luiryi Erazo	Trujillanos
CB	(Venezuela)	Jonathan España	Atlético Venezuela
LB	(Colombia)	Yuber Mosquera	Deportivo Táchira
DM	(Venezuela)	Carlos Suárez	Carabobo
RM	(Venezuela)	Miguel Mea Vitali	Caracas
LM	(Venezuela)	Luis "Cariaco" González	Monagas
AM	(Venezuela)	Yeferson Soteldo	Zamora
FW	(Venezuela)	Richard Blanco	Zamora
FW	(Venezuela)	Edder Farías	Caracas
