= Ángel González (Venezuelan footballer) =

Venezuelan footballer (born 1994)

Personal information
- Full name: Ángel Daniel González Berroterán
- Date of birth: 26 December 1994 (age 31)
- Place of birth: Venezuela
- Height: 1.75 m (5 ft 9 in)
- Position: Forward

Team information
- Current team: Monagas

Senior career*
Years	Team	Apps	(Gls)
2015–	Monagas	7	(2)
2017	→ Atlético Socopó (loan)	9	(1)
- * Club domestic league appearances and goals as of 16:05, 4 May 2018 (UTC)

Ángel Daniel González Berroterán (born 26 December 1994) is a Venezuelan professional footballer who plays as a forward for Venezuelan Primera División side Monagas.

== Career ==
González began his career with Venezuelan Primera División side Monagas. He first appeared with the first-team in August 2015 when he was an unused sub for a Copa Venezuela defeat to Tucanes. His professional debut arrived on 28 February 2016 during a 3–0 loss versus Deportivo Táchira in the Primera División, prior to scoring his first goal in his second start for Monagas against Ureña on 20 April. After two goals in seven appearances, González was loaned to fellow Primera División team Atlético Socopó in July 2017. He went on to score one goal in nine games for Atlético Socopó as they were relegated.

== Career statistics ==
As of 4 May 2018.

Club statistics
Club	Season	League			Cup (Note: Includes the Copa Venezuela)		League Cup		Continental (Note: Includes the Copa Libertadores)		Other		Total	
Club	Season	Division	Apps	Goals	Apps	Goals	Apps	Goals	Apps	Goals	Apps	Goals	Apps	Goals
Monagas	2015	Primera División	0	0	0	0	—		—		0	0	0	0
Monagas	2016	Primera División	7	2	0	0	—		—		0	0	7	2
Monagas	2017	Primera División	0	0	0	0	—		—		0	0	0	0
Monagas	2018	Primera División	0	0	0	0	—		0	0	0	0	0	0
Monagas	Total		7	2	0	0	—		0	0	0	0	7	2
Atlético Socopó (loan)	2017	Primera División	9	1	0	0	—		—		0	0	9	1
Career total			16	3	0	0	—		0	0	0	0	16	3
