= Jefferson Savarino =

Venezuelan Italian footballer (born 1996)

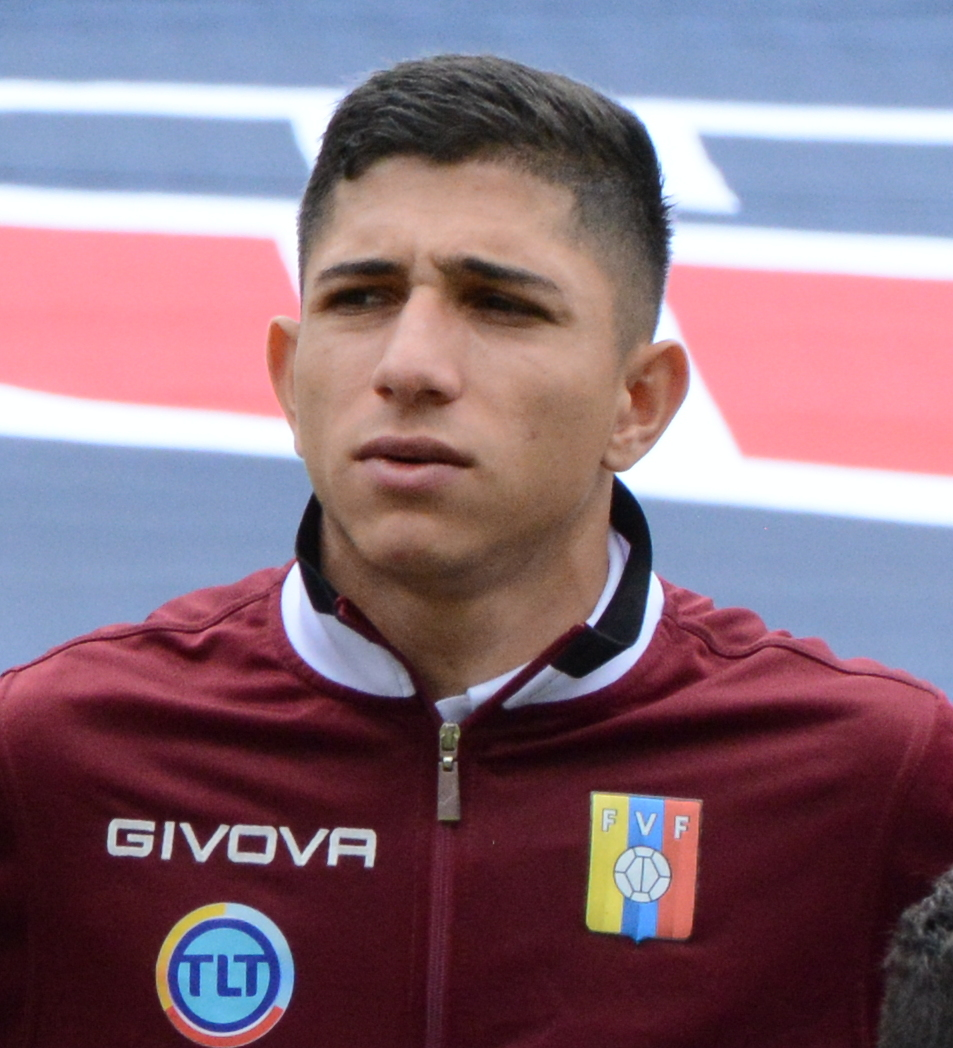
- Savarino with Venezuela in 2019

Personal information
- Full name: Jefferson David Savarino Quintero
- Date of birth: 11 November 1996 (age 30)
- Place of birth: Maracaibo, Venezuela
- Height: 1.71 m (5 ft 7 in)
- Positions: Attacking midfielder; winger

Team information
- Current team: Fluminense
- Number: 11

Youth career
- –2013: Zulia

Senior career*
Years	Team	Apps	(Gls)
2013–2017	Zulia	132	(32)
2017	→ Real Salt Lake (loan)	22	(6)
2017–2020	Real Salt Lake	65	(16)
2020–2022	Atlético Mineiro	53	(14)
2022–2024	Real Salt Lake	47	(15)
2024–2026	Botafogo	66	(15)
2026–	Fluminense	13	(1)

International career^{‡}
2014	Venezuela U21	4	(0)
2015	Venezuela U20	3	(0)
2017–	Venezuela	51	(4)
- * Club domestic league appearances and goals as of 6 April 2026 ‡ National team caps and goals as of 23:18, 9 September 2025 (AEST)

Jefferson David Savarino Quintero (born 11 November 1996) is a Venezuelan professional footballer who plays as attacking midfielder or winger for Campeonato Brasileiro Série A club Fluminense and the Venezuela national team.

== Club career ==
=== Zulia ===
Born in Maracaibo, Savarino began his professional career at Zulia F.C. in 2013. In four years at the club, he played 141 games and scored 36 goals, participating in the 2016 Torneo Clausura and Copa Venezuela victories.

=== Real Salt Lake ===
On 9 May 2017, Savarino joined Major League Soccer side Real Salt Lake on loan from Zulia of Venezuela. He subsequently signed permanently for the club. In total, he scored 22 goals in three seasons with RSL. In May 2022, RSL announced that Savarino was resigned to the team.

=== Atlético Mineiro ===
On February 7, 2020, his transfer to Atlético Mineiro was announced, for a fee of 2 million dollars. Em sua segunda temporada, won the 2021 Campeonato Brasileiro da Série A, da 2021 Copa do Brasil e do 2021 Campeonato Mineiro. No início de 2022, sagrou-se campeão da 2022 Supercopa do Brasil e do 2022 Campeonato Mineiro.

=== Real Salt Lake ===
On April 30, 2022, his return to Real Salt Lake was confirmed, in a deal valued at $2.5 million.

=== Botafogo ===
In January 2024, Jefferson Savarino was officially announced by Botafogo and signed a permanent contract until December 2026.

In his first season he was champion of the Copa Libertadores de 2024, being a pillar in his team's attack, scoring 4 goals and providing 4 assists, and also won the 2024 Campeonato Brasileiro Série A, scoring 8 goals and providing 7 assists.

=== Fluminense ===
On 22 January 2026, Fluminense officially announced the signing of Jefferson Savarino, who signed with the Tricolor until the end of 2029.

== International career ==
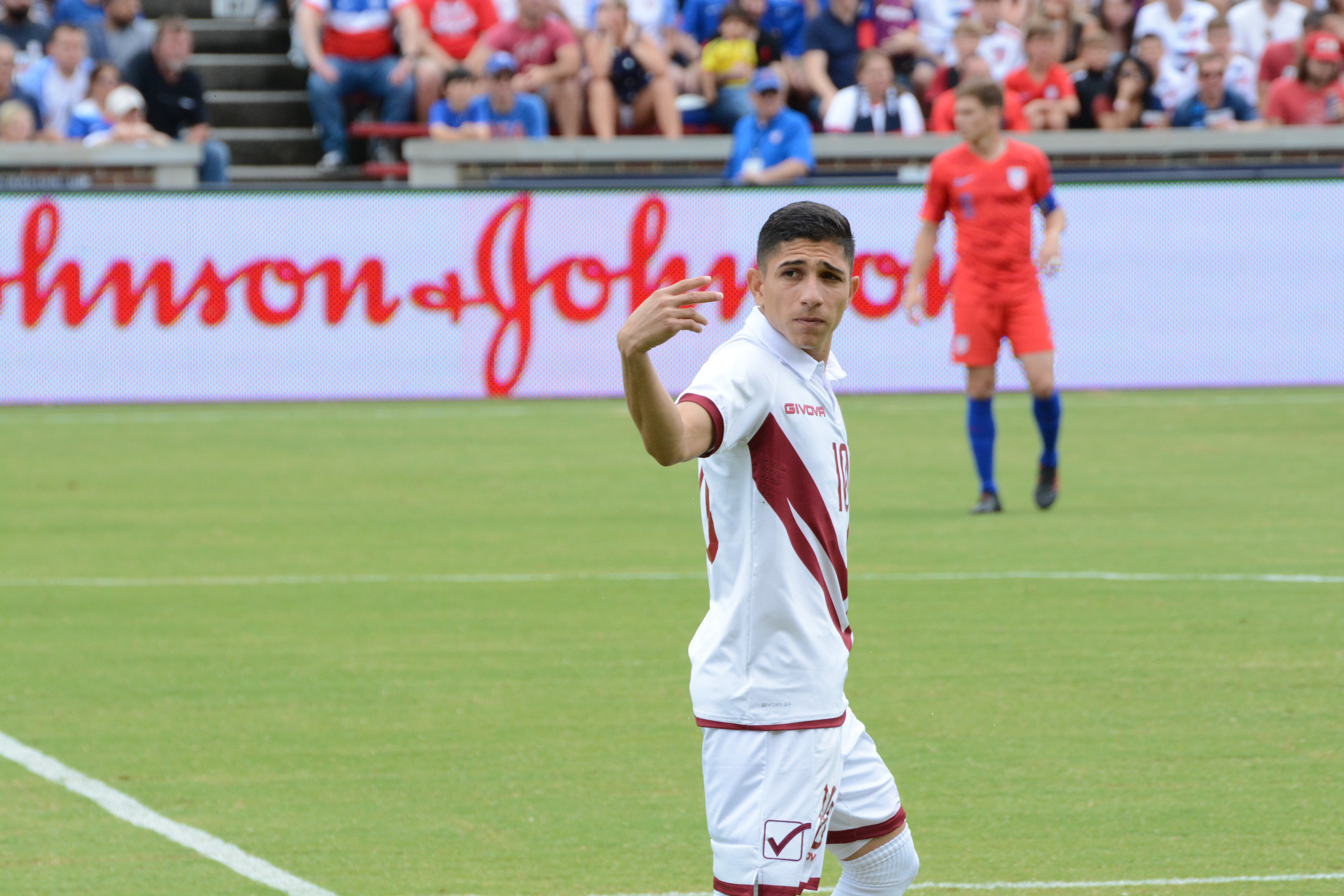
Savarino with Venezuela in 2019

Savarino was born in Venezuela and is of Italian descent, holding dual-citizenship. A youth international for Venezuela, he debuted for the Venezuela national team in 2017.

Savarino he was called up for three editions of the Copa América (2019, 2021 and 2024).

== Style of play ==
Savarino plays primarily as an attacking midfielder, but he can also operate as a winger on either flank.

== Career statistics ==
=== Club ===
As of match played 29 August 2025

Appearances and goals by club, season and competition
Club	Season	League			State league (Note: Includes Campeonato Mineiro, Campeonato Carioca)		National cup (Note: Includes Copa Venezuela, U.S. Open Cup, Copa do Brasil)		Continental		Other		Total	
Club	Season	Division	Apps	Goals	Apps	Goals	Apps	Goals	Apps	Goals	Apps	Goals	Apps	Goals
Zulia	2012–13	VPD	6	0	—		0	0	0	0	—		6	0
Zulia	2013–14	VPD	26	2	—		0	0	0	0	—		26	2
Zulia	2014–15	VPD	24	0	—		0	0	0	0	—		24	0
Zulia	2015	VPD	20	6	—		0	0	0	0	—		20	6
Zulia	2016	VPD	45	18	—		5	3	0	0	—		50	21
Zulia	2017	VPD	11	6	—		0	0	4 (Note: Appearances in Copa Libertadores)	1	—		15	7
Zulia	Total		132	32	—		5	3	4	1	—		141	36
Real Salt Lake	2017	MLS	22	6	—		0	0	0	0	—		22	6
Real Salt Lake	2018	MLS	35	7	—		3	0	0	0	—		38	7
Real Salt Lake	2019	MLS	30	9	—		0	0	—		1 (Note: Appearance(s) in Leagues Cup)	0	31	9
Real Salt Lake	Total		87	22	—		3	0	—		1	0	91	22
Atlético Mineiro	2020	Série A	32	7	10	3	1	0	—		—		43	10
Atlético Mineiro	2021	Série A	18	5	8	0	5	0	9	2	—		40	7
Atlético Mineiro	2022	Série A	3	2	9	2	1	0	2	0	1 (Note: Appearance in Supercopa do Brasil)	0	16	4
Atlético Mineiro	Total		53	14	27	5	7	0	11	2	1	0	99	21
Real Salt Lake	2022	MLS	20	7	—		0	0	—		—		20	7
Real Salt Lake	2023	MLS	27	8	—		3	2	—		4	1	34	11
Real Salt Lake	Total		47	15	—		3	2	—		4	1	54	18
Botafogo	2024	Série A	28	8	7	2	4	0	15	4	—		54	14
Botafogo	2025	Série A	14	3	4	1	4	1	5	0	7 (Note: Four appearances in FIFA Club World Cup, two appearances in Recopa Sudamericana, One appearance in Supercopa do Brasil)	0	34	5
Botafogo	Total		42	11	11	3	8	1	20	4	7	0	88	19
Career total			361	94	38	8	26	56	35	7	13	1	463	116

=== International ===
As of 9 September 2025

Appearances and goals by national team and year
National team	Year	Apps	Goals
Venezuela	2017	1	0
Venezuela	2018	5	0
Venezuela	2019	7	1
Venezuela	2020	3	0
Venezuela	2021	8	0
Venezuela	2022	6	1
Venezuela	2023	6	1
Venezuela	2024	10	1
Venezuela	2025	5	0
Total		51	4

Scores and results list Venezuela's goal tally first, score column indicates score after each Savarino goal.

List of international goals scored by Jefferson Savarino
No.	Date	Venue	Opponent	Score	Result	Competition
1	9 June 2019	Nippert Stadium, Cincinnati, United States	United States	2–0	3–0	Friendly
2	27 September 2022	Stadion Wiener Neustadt, Wiener Neustadt, Austria	United Arab Emirates	1–0	4–0	Friendly
3	21 November 2023	Estadio Nacional, Lima, Peru	Peru	1–1	1–1	2026 World Cup qualification
4	19 November 2024	Estadio Nacional Julio Martínez Prádanos, Santiago, Chile	Chile	0–1	4–2	2026 World Cup qualification

== Honours ==
Zulia

- Venezuelan Primera División: Clausura 2016
- Copa Venezuela: 2016

Atlético Mineiro

- Campeonato Brasileiro Série A: 2021
- Copa do Brasil: 2021
- Campeonato Mineiro: 2020, 2021, 2022
- Supercopa do Brasil: 2022

Botafogo

- Copa Libertadores: 2024
- Campeonato Brasileiro Série A: 2024

Fluminense

- Campeonato Carioca: 2026

Venezuela

- Kirin Cup: 2019

Individual

- El País Venezuelan Primera División Player of the Year: 2016
- Bola de Prata: 2024
- Copa Libertadores Team of the Tournament: 2024
- South American Team of the Year: 2024
