= Luis Simigliani =

Venezuelan footballer (born 1999)

Personal information
- Full name: Luis Carlos Simigliani Carpio
- Date of birth: 15 June 1999 (age 27)
- Place of birth: Calabozo, Guárico, Venezuela
- Height: 1.89 m (6 ft 2 in)
- Position: Forward

Team information
- Current team: ReggioRavagnese 1960

Senior career*
| Years | Team | Apps | (Gls) |
| 2015–2016 | Arroceros de Calabozo | | |
| 2017 | Atlético Socopó | 11 | (3) |
| 2018 | Deportivo Lara | 0 | (0) |
| 2018 | UCV | | |
| 2019 | Deportivo JBL | | |
| 2019 | Ciudad Vinotinto | | |
| 2020 | Sant Jordi | 0 | (0) |
| 2020–2021 | Naval Reinosa | 5 | (3) |
| 2021–2022 | Inter Ibiza | 31 | (7) |
| 2022–2023 | As Pontes | 32 | (8) |
| 2023–2024 | Finale 1908 | | (14) |
| 2024–2025 | Bianco Calcio | | (29) |
| 2025– | ReggioRavagnese 1960 | | |
- * Club domestic league appearances and goals as of 17:25, 13 March 2026 (UTC)

Luis Carlos Simigliani Carpio (born 15 June 1999) is a Venezuelan footballer who plays as a forward for Italian club ReggioRavagnese 1960.

== Early life ==
Simigliani was born in Calabozo in the Venezuelan state of Guárico, and has two brothers; his elder brother represented Venezuela at under-20 level but retired at twenty-two, while his younger brother, Giancarlo, played alongside him in Italy.

== Club career ==
Simigliani began his career with Arroceros de Calabozo, featuring in the club's 4–1 Copa Venezuela loss to Atlético Venezuela in July 2016, at the age of seventeen. He joined Atlético Socopó ahead of the club's first season in the Venezuelan Primera División, and on his debut, he scored the club's first goal in the competition; a 90th minute consolation in a 4–1 loss to Deportivo La Guaira. Goals against Trujillanos and Zulia followed, drawing interest from clubs overseas. He went on trial with Chilean club Universidad de Chile in mid-2017, being initially assigned to the under-19 side. Despite the trial set to last until the 2018, it was cut short due to Universidad de Chile having already hit their foreign player quota.

On his return to Venezuela, Simigliani joined the academy of Deportivo Lara in March 2018. However, this spell was short-lived and in July of the same year, he joined Universidad Central de Venezuela (UCV). The following season, he played for Deportivo JBL in the Venezuelan Segunda División, before ending 2019 with Ciudad Vinotinto.

In August 2020 he moved to Spain, reportedly signing a two-year deal with Sant Jordi. However, it was later revealed that he had not been registered, after his performances in training had failed to convince coaching staff. He also encountered issues with his paperwork, and by the time he joined Naval Reinosa in 2021, he had spent seven months suspended. Having helped Naval to the Regional Preferente de Cantabria title, with three goals in the five games he played in, he joined Tercera RFEF club Inter Ibiza in July 2021. He spent the 2022–23 season with As Pontes.

In 2023 he moved to Italy, signing with Finale 1908. After fourteen goals for Finale, he joined Bianco Calcio, where he continued his good goal-scoring form, winning the top scorer between the Eccellenza and Promozione leagues award, given by Gazzetta del Sud, having scored twenty-nine goals. For the 2025–26 season, he joined ReggioRavagnese 1960 alongside his brother, Giancarlo, and scored nine goals in his first sixteen appearances for the club.

== Career statistics ==
=== Club ===
As of 13 March 2026

Appearances and goals by club, season and competition
| Club | Season | League | | | Cup (Note: Includes Copa Venezuela, Copa del Rey and Coppa Italia) | | Other | | Total | |
| Club | Season | Division | Apps | Goals | Apps | Goals | Apps | Goals | Apps | Goals |
|---|---|---|---|---|---|---|---|---|---|---|
| Atlético Socopó | 2017 | Venezuelan Primera División | 11 | 3 | 0 | 0 | 0 | 0 | 11 | 3 |
| Deportivo Lara | 2018 | Venezuelan Primera División | 0 | 0 | 0 | 0 | 0 | 0 | 0 | 0 |
| Sant Jordi | 2020–21 | Tercera División | 0 | 0 | 0 | 0 | 0 | 0 | 0 | 0 |
| Naval Reinosa | 2020–21 | Preferente de Cantabria | 5 | 3 | 0 | 0 | 0 | 0 | 5 | 3 |
| Inter Ibiza | 2021–22 | Tercera RFEF | 31 | 7 | 0 | 0 | 0 | 0 | 31 | 7 |
| As Pontes | 2022–23 | Preferente de Galicia | 32 | 8 | 0 | 0 | 0 | 0 | 32 | 8 |
| Career total | | | 79 | 21 | 0 | 0 | 0 | 0 | 79 | 21 |
