= JBL (disambiguation) =

JBL is an American audio electronics company.

JBL may refer also to:

== People ==
- J. B. L. Reyes (1902–1994), Filipino jurist
- JBL, ring name of John Layfield (John "Bradshaw" Layfield; born 1966), American professional wrestler

== Other uses ==
- Deportivo JBL del Zulia, a football club based in Maracaibo, Venezuela
- Japan Basketball League
- Journal of Biblical Literature
- The ticker symbol of Jabil
