= Frank Flores (football manager) =

Venezuelan football manager

Personal information
- Full name: Frank Flores Redondo
- Date of birth: 16 August 1984 (age 42)
- Place of birth: Maracaibo, Venezuela
- Position: Forward

Youth career
- Years: Team
- La Victoria
- Deportivo Táchira
- Atlético Zulia

Managerial career
- La Victoria (youth)
- Zulia (youth)
- Maracaibo (youth)
- 2014–2017: Deportivo JBL
- 2017–2019: Deportivo JBL
- 2020–2021: Zulia (youth)
- 2021: Zulia

Frank Flores Redondo (born 18 August 1984) is a Venezuelan football manager.

== Career ==
Flores was born in Maracaibo, and represented La Victoria FC, Deportivo Táchira and Atlético Zulia as a youth. He retired before playing as a senior, and started working as a manager in his first club's youth categories.

After working in the youth sides of Zulia and Maracaibo, Flores was appointed manager of Tercera División side Deportivo JBL in 2014. He achieved back-to-back promotions to Primera División in the end of 2015, but left on a mutual agreement on 7 April 2017.

On 29 August 2017, Flores returned to JBL, but could not avoid the club's relegation. He left the club in the end of 2019, and returned to Zulia as manager of the youth sides.

On 5 February 2021, Flores was named manager of Zulia's first team.
