= Darwin González =

Venezuelan footballer (born 1994)

Personal information
- Full name: Darwin Jesús González Mendoza
- Date of birth: 20 May 1994 (age 32)
- Place of birth: Calabozo, Venezuela
- Height: 1.78 m (5 ft 10 in)
- Position: Midfielder

Team information
- Current team: Al-Wehda

Senior career*
Years	Team	Apps	(Gls)
2014	Arroceros		
2015–2019	Deportivo La Guaira	77	(23)
2017–2018	→ Patronato (loan)	3	(0)
2019–2020	Étoile du Sahel	36	(6)
2021	Deportivo La Guaira	26	(4)
2022–2025	Cape Town City	88	(15)
2025–2026	Al-Orobah	35	(9)
2026–	Al-Wehda	1	(1)
- * Club domestic league appearances and goals as of 14 May 2026

Darwin Jesús González Mendoza (born 20 May 1994) is a Venezuelan professional footballer who plays as a midfielder for Saudi Arabian club Al-Wehda.

== Career ==
González started his career in the Venezuelan Segunda División with Arroceros. In 2015, González joined Venezuelan Primera División side Deportivo La Guaira. He made his debut for the club on 26 April against Zulia, before scoring two goals in his second appearance versus Tucanes seven days later. He subsequently scored eighteen goals in eighty-one matches across the following 2015, 2016 and 2017 seasons. During which period he also scored goals in the Copa Venezuela and Copa Sudamericana. In July 2017, González was loaned to Patronato of the Argentine Primera División. Three appearances followed.

On 15 January 2019, González moved to Tunisian football after agreeing a move to Étoile du Sahel; penning a three-and-a-half-year contract. In 2020, Étoile were handed a transfer ban after failing to pay fees to Deportivo La Guaira for the deal involving González.

In September 2025, González joined Saudi FDL club Al-Orobah.

== Career statistics ==
As of 9 July 2020.

Club statistics
Club	Season	League			Cup		Continental		Other		Total	
Club	Season	Division	Apps	Goals	Apps	Goals	Apps	Goals	Apps	Goals	Apps	Goals
Deportivo La Guaira	2014–15	Venezuelan Primera División	2	2	0	0	0	0	0	0	2	2
Deportivo La Guaira	2015	Venezuelan Primera División	11	2	5	1	2 (Note: Appearance(s) in the Copa Sudamericana)	0	5 (Note: Appearance(s) in the Venezuelan Primera División play-offs)	2	23	5
Deportivo La Guaira	2016	Venezuelan Primera División	34	4	0	0	5	2	2	0	41	6
Deportivo La Guaira	2017	Venezuelan Primera División	13	4	0	0	—		4	3	17	7
Deportivo La Guaira	2018	Venezuelan Primera División	17	11	3	2	—		6	2	26	15
Deportivo La Guaira	Total		77	23	8	3	7	2	17	7	109	35
Patronato (loan)	2017–18	Argentine Primera División	3	0	0	0	—		0	0	3	0
Étoile du Sahel	2018–19	Ligue 1	9	0	-	1	6 (Note: Appearance(s) in the CAF Confederation Cup)	0	1 (Note: Appearance(s) in the Arab Club Champions Cup)	0	16	1
Étoile du Sahel	2019–20	Ligue 1	13	4	0	0	3 (Note: Appearance(s) in the CAF Champions League)	0	0	0	16	4
Étoile du Sahel	Total		22	4	-	1	9	0	1	0	32	5
Career total			102	27	8	4	16	2	18	7	144	40

== Honours ==
Deportivo La Guaira

- Copa Venezuela: 2015

Étoile du Sahel

- Arab Club Champions Cup: 2018–19
