= Caio Felipe =

Caio Felipe may refer to:

== Footballers ==
- Caio Felipe (footballer, born February 1999), Caio Felipe da Silva Rocha, Brazilian right back
- Caio Felipe (footballer, born April 1999), Caio Felipe dos Santos Silva, Brazilian defender

== See also ==
- Caio (disambiguation)
