= 2013 Copa Venezuela =

Tournament details
- Country: Venezuela
- Dates: 14 August – 5 December 2013
- Teams: 34

Final positions
- Champions: Caracas FC (6th title)
- Runners-up: Deportivo Táchira

Tournament statistics
- Top goal scorer(s): Edder Farías (6 goals)

The 2013 Copa Venezuela was the 44th staging of the Copa Venezuela. The winner qualified for the 2014 Copa Sudamericana.

== First round ==
- Teams entering this round: 8 teams from Venezuelan Segunda División.
- First legs: August 14; Second legs: August 21.

Team 1	Agg.	Team 2	1st leg	2nd leg
Central & Oriental Group
Universidad Central	2–1	Arroceros de Calabozo	0–0	2–1
Angostura FC	0–1	Estudiantes de Caroní	0–1	0–0
Occidental Group
Unión Atlético Falcón	3–1	Universidad de los Andes	1–0	2–1
Lotería del Táchira	2–2 (a)	Deportivo San Antonio	2–2	0–0

== Second round ==
- Teams entering this round: 16 teams from Venezuelan Primera División, 8 teams from Venezuelan Segunda División.
- First legs: August 28, September 4; Second legs: September 7, 8.

Team 1	Agg.	Team 2	1st leg	2nd leg
Central & Oriental Group
Guatire FC	2–1	Tucanes de Amazonas	1–0	1–1
Universidad Central	0–2	Caracas FC	0–0	0–2
Estudiantes de Caroní	2–4	Mineros de Guayana	1–3	1–1
SC Guaraní	1–6	Aragua FC	0–3	1–3
Metropolitanos FC	1–2	Deportivo La Guaira	1–0	0–2
Real Anzoátegui	2–3	Atlético Venezuela	1–0	1–3
Monagas SC	3–3 (a)	Deportivo Petare	2–3	1–0
Occidental Group
Ureña SC	1–6	Deportivo Táchira	1–2	0–4
Deportivo San Antonio	1–8	Atlético El Vigía	1–3	0–5
Unión Atlético Falcón	3–4	Trujillanos FC	3–1	0–3
Portuguesa FC	3–2	Deportivo Lara	2–1	1–1
Policía de Lara	4–4 (a)	Llaneros de Guanare	2–0	2–4
Yaracuyanos FC	2–1	Zulia FC	1–1	1–0
Carabobo FC	0–5	Estudiantes de Mérida	0–0	0–5

== Round of 16 ==
- Teams entering this round: Deportivo Anzoátegui (2012 Copa Venezuela champion), Zamora FC (2012–13 Venezuelan Primera División champion).
- First legs: September 18; Second legs: October 2, 3.

Team 1	Agg.	Team 2	1st leg	2nd leg
Central & Oriental Group
Guatire FC	2–5	Deportivo Petare	0–3	2–2
Caracas FC	3–1	Atlético Venezuela	2–0	1–1
Aragua FC	2–1	Deportivo La Guaira	1–0	1–1
Mineros de Guayana	2–2 (3–5 p)	Deportivo Anzoátegui	2–0	0–2
Occidental Group
Trujillanos FC	3–2	Estudiantes de Mérida	1–1	2–1
Policía de Lara	4–9	Zamora FC	0–3	4–6
Portuguesa FC	3–5	Yaracuyanos FC	2–3	1–2
Atlético El Vigía	1–3	Deportivo Táchira	1–1	0–2

== Quarterfinals ==
- First legs: October 13; Second legs: October 23.

Team 1	Agg.	Team 2	1st leg	2nd leg
Central & Oriental Group
Caracas FC	4–2	Deportivo Petare	1–0	3–2
Deportivo Anzoátegui	2–4	Aragua FC	1–1	1–3
Occidental Group
Zamora FC	2–1	Trujillanos FC	2–0	0–1
Deportivo Táchira	2–2 (3–1 p)	Yaracuyanos FC	0–2	2–0

== Semifinals ==
- First legs: October 30; Second legs: November 6.

Team 1	Agg.	Team 2	1st leg	2nd leg
Central & Oriental Group
Aragua FC	1–3	Caracas FC	0–1	1–2
Occidental Group
Deportivo Táchira	3–0	Zamora FC	1–0	2–0

== Final ==
First leg: November 27; Second leg: December 5.

Team 1	Agg.	Team 2	1st leg	2nd leg
Deportivo Táchira	2–3	Caracas FC	2–1	0–2
