= Daniel de Oliveira (footballer) =

Venezuelan former footballer (born 1970)

Personal information
- Date of birth: 22 April 1970 (age 56)
- Place of birth: Caracas, Venezuela
- Positions: Midfielder; forward

Team information
- Current team: ARIZONA (youth manager)

Youth career
- 1975–?: Colegio Claret
- State Select team
- Long Island University (NCAA I)
- ?–1991: Hotta Bavarian SC

Senior career*
Years	Team	Apps	(Gls)
1991–1993	Almazora		
1993–1994	Deportivo Italia		
1995–1996	Luis Ángel Firpo		
1996	DC United	0	(0)
1996	Dallas Sidekicks	3	(0)
1996–1997	Carabobo	12	(8)
1997	New Orleans Gamblers		
1997–1998	Trujillanos	15	(6)
1998	Staten Island Vipers		

International career
1996	Venezuela	16	(3)

Managerial career
- 2006–2007: Venezuela U15
- 2008–2009: Venezuela U17
- 2015–2016: Yaracuyanos
- 2018: Metropolitanos
- 2019: Estudiantes de Caracas
- 2020–: Valley United (Associated Head Coach)
- 2022: Valley United (Interim Head Coach)
- 2024-Actual: GCU (Associate Head Coach)
- * Club domestic league appearances and goals

Daniel de Oliveira Sechi (born 22 April 1970) is a retired Venezuelan football midfielder who coached the Venezuelan U-15 and U-17 national soccer teams. He is the Elite FIFA coaching instructor for Colegio de Entrenadores (Instructor #026) and Federacion Venezolana de Futbol.

He is considered by Venezuelan soccer experts such as the most prepared and potential coach of his country. He has been the ambassador of Copa Coca-Cola for three consecutive years. Among his advisors, tutors, teachers and coaches during his career are Juan Osorio (Colombia), Alberto Villalobos (VEN), his father Celso De Oliveira (BRA), Luis Molina (Perú), Arnold Ramirez (Costa Rica), John Ramirez (Colombia), Rafael Amaya (Colombia), Alfonso Mondelo (actual Soccer Director of MLS), Bruce Arena (USA), Bob Bradley (USA), Manolo Contreras (VEN), José "Pepito" Hernández (Spain), Jupp Heynckes (GER), Paco Rielo (Spain), Mike Jeffries (USA), Alvaro "Pitillo" Valencia (Colombia), Mariano Moreno (RFEF), Ignacio Prieto (Chile), Kiril Dojčinovski (Macedonia), Roberto Falcòn (Spain), Aaron Winter (NED), Ruud Dokter (NED), Wim Koevermans (NED). Joaquin Alonso (RFEF), Vicente Miera (Olympic gold medal at Barcelona 92, Vicente Del Bosque (Spain) and Marcelo Bielsa, who he visited in France during his coaching time with LOSC (Ligue 1) among others.

== Player ==
=== Youth ===
De Oliveira attended the Claret School where he was the 1979, 1981, 1982, 1984 and 1986 Athlete of the Year. He is the school's all-time leading scorer (576 goals) and a five-times champion of the Eastern Intercollegiate League of Venezuela. During those years, he was also the 1986 and 1987 Junior National Select Team Program (LIDES) Player of the Year. In 1987, De Oliveira moved to the United States to attend Long Island University. While there, he played on the university soccer team from 1987 to 1990. In 1987, Soccer America named him to its All Freshmen Team. Daniel was the top scorer of the team in 1987 and 1990. He was also named the 1987 Northeast Conference Rookie of the Year. He finished his collegiate career with thirty-five goals making him among the all-time scoring leaders of his alma mater. While in college, he also played indoor soccer during the winter. He was part of the 1988 U-19 MITRE Indoor Soccer National Championship team Hotta Bavarian SC in Baltimore. During that tournament, Daniel was named ALL TOURNAMENT TEAM along his teammates Tony Meola and John Maessner.

=== Professional ===
After graduation, de Oliveira pursued his professional career in Venezuela, Brasil, USA, Spain, and El Salvador. He was with C.D. Luis Ángel Firpo of the El Salvadoran Primera División de Fútbol Profesional during the 1995-1996 season. In July 1995, he signed with the Dallas Sidekicks as a free agent and played 3 games with the team in early 1996. In February 1996, D.C. United selected de Oliveira in the 12th round (120th overall) of the 1996 MLS Inaugural Player Draft. He signed with United, but was waived on April 16, 1996, during the season International players League roster reduction. He was offered by coach Bruce Arena to stay with the Virginia affiliated team, Richmond Kickers, but decided to leave the team. On August 5, 1997, the Staten Island Vipers of USISL signed De Oliveira.

- As Beach Soccer player- 2005 Venezuela National Beach soccer Championship 1st place
- Venezuelan Beach Soccer National team player at CONMEBOL World Cup qualifying Tournament in Macaé, Brasil / 4th place.

=== National team ===
- Member of the Venezuela National Team (7 Caps)
- Member of the Venezuela U-23 Olympic National Team.
- '98 World Cup qualifying Venezuela National Team
- Member of the Venezuelan National Beach soccer Team (4th place Macae, Brazil 2006)

== Manager ==
Daniel De Oliveira currently serves as Associate Head Coach for the prestige NCAA Division I Grand Canyon University Antelopes. He is the only Venezuelan coach to hold the KNVB (Netherlands soccer Federation) Match Analysis Certification, alongside the USSF (United States Soccer Federation)coaching license. Daniel is among the select few coaches worldwide to earn both the CONMEBOL PRO License and the USSF A License. Additionally, he is one of only eight elite coaches to have completed all three levels of the FIFA FUTURE III Instructor Certification, as well as the FIFA Grassroots and FIFA Sports Management Diploma.

Daniel has represented South America at five AEFCA Symposiums for top European coaches (Split 2012, Antalya 2013, Zagreb 2014, Como 2016, and Belgrade 2017). He has coached the Venezuelan U-15 and U-17 national teams since 2007 and served as an official FIFA coaching instructor for South America and the Caribbean. Under his leadership, the Venezuelan U-15 national team achieved a historic group stage 2nd place finish, tied with Uruguay—marking the best performance by a Venezuelan youth team in a CONMEBOL U-15 tournament. He has also scouted and developed players who went on to represent the Venezuelan senior national team, such as Fernando Aristeguieta (former La Liga), Josef Martinez (Earthquakes MLS), Alexander González (Emelec, Equador), Juanpi Añor (Greece), Rómulo Otero (Fortaleza, Brazil), Bernardo Añor (former MLS Kansas City and Columbus Crew player), among others. In 2015 he advised and helped the prestigious Seminoles women's soccer program to sign Deyna Castellano known as The Queen of soccer in her native country, Venezuela. She was scouted by Daniel during the Copa Coca-Cola. Daniel was the ambassador of Copa Coca-Cola.
