= Ricardo Andreutti =

Venezuelan footballer (born 1987)

Personal information
- Full name: Ricardo Andreutti Jordán
- Date of birth: 30 June 1987 (age 39)
- Place of birth: Caracas, Venezuela
- Height: 1.79 m (5 ft 10 in)
- Position: Midfielder

Youth career
- Chioggia Sottomarina

Senior career*
Years	Team	Apps	(Gls)
2005–2006	Chioggia Sottomarina	5	(0)
2006–2014	Deportivo Petare	83	(9)
2013–2016	Caracas FC	85	(5)
2016–2018	Deportivo Lara	72	(1)
2019–2020	Caracas FC	44	(0)
- * Club domestic league appearances and goals

Ricardo Andreutti (otherwise known as Ricky, born June 30, 1987) is a retired footballer who hails from Caracas, Venezuela. Generally, his preferred position was as defensive midfielder.

== Early life and youth ==
Andreutti was born in Caracas, in 1987.

At the age of 18, he joined Italian amateur outfit AC Chioggia Sottomarina which later amalgamated with local rivals ASD Sottomarina Lido to become Clodiense S.S.D. and made a total of five first-team appearances. From there, he would then go to Uruguay and play there.

== Transfers ==
=== Petare FC ===
After Uruguay, Andreutti returned to Venezuela to join Petare F.C.

=== Caracas FC ===
In 2013, he was bought by Primera División club Caracas FC for an unknown price to bolster their defensive midfield options. A fan favorite with Caracas FC, he donned the number 15 shirt with them as well.

=== ACD Lara ===
After Leaving Caracas FC, Andreutti joined ACD Lara on a two-and-a-half-year deal.

== Personal life ==
Similar to Andreutti, his father was a full-time footballer and was with Caracas FC when they were known as Caracas Yamaha FC and married Veronica Jordán on December 14, 1984. His last name, Jordán, refers to his maternal side of the family. Their parents ran a motorcycle spare parts business.

Three years later, a brother named Victoria was born, adding another member into the Andreutti family.

Aged six, he began playing football. As an alternate interest, Ricardo started judo for a while.

== International Cup Appearances ==
Year	Club	Cup	Apps	Goals
2016	ACD Lara	Copa Sudamericana	2	0
2016	Caracas FC	Copa Libertadores	2	0
2014	Caracas FC	Copa Libertadores	2	0
2014	Caracas FC	Copa Sudamericana	3	0
2011	Petare F.C.	Copa Libertadores	0	0
2010	Petare F.C.	Copa Libertadores	0	0

== Achievements and honours ==
- Copa Venezuela winner (2013)
- Venezuelan Primera División runners-up (2008-09)
