= Luis González (footballer, born 1999) =

Venezuelan footballer

Personal information
- Full name: Luis Ángel González Torres
- Date of birth: 7 November 1999 (age 27)
- Place of birth: Maracay, Venezuela
- Height: 1.82 m (6 ft 0 in)
- Position: Goalkeeper

Youth career
- Caracas
- Atlético Venezuela

Senior career*
Years	Team	Apps	(Gls)
2018–2019	Atlético Venezuela	5	(0)
2018	→ Chicó de Guayana (loan)		
2020–2023	Deportivo Miranda		
- * Club domestic league appearances and goals as of 12:44, 17 August 2020 (UTC)

Luis Ángel González Torres (born 7 November 1999) is a Venezuelan footballer who plays as a goalkeeper.

== Career ==
=== Club career ===
González played at Caracas during his adolescence, before joining Atlético Venezuela later. He played his way up through to the first team in 2018, getting his debut in a 3-2 defeat on 27 January 2018 against Deportivo Lara at the age of 18. He made five appearances in the Venezuelan Primera División, before he was loaned out to Chicó de Guayana for six months to continue his development. He returned for the 2019 season but wasn't taken into count, before he left Atlético.

In January 2020, González moved to Venezuelan Segunda División side Deportivo Petare. As of July 2021, he was still playing for the club. Ahead of the 2023 season, the club changed name to Deportivo Miranda. González left Deportivo Miranda at the end of the 2023 season.
