= Víctor Aquino =

Paraguayan footballer (born 1985)

Personal information
- Full name: Víctor Marcelino Aquino Romero
- Date of birth: 26 November 1985 (age 40)
- Place of birth: Asunción, Paraguay
- Height: 1.87 m (6 ft 2 in)
- Position: Forward

Team information
- Current team: César Vallejo
- Number: 9

Youth career
- Libertad

Senior career*
Years	Team	Apps	(Gls)
2007	San Lorenzo-PY	14	(16)
2008	Palestino	40	(20)
2009	Marítimo	8	(1)
2009–2011	Nacional	68	(19)
2011–2014	Newell's Old Boys	34	(6)
2012–2013	→ Belgrano (loan)	25	(3)
2013–2014	→ Crucero del Norte (loan)	17	(0)
2014	Altamira	23	(10)
2015	Santaní	14	(1)
2016	Tolima	31	(9)
2017	Táchira	33	(18)
2018	San Juan de Pasto	10	(1)
2018	Táchira	18	(9)
2019	Rionegro Águilas	12	(0)
2019	Deportivo La Guaira	20	(8)
2020–	César Vallejo	6	(0)
- * Club domestic league appearances and goals as of 12:49, 10 May 2020 (UTC)

Víctor Marcelino Aquino Romero (born 26 November 1985) is a Paraguayan footballer who plays for César Vallejo as a forward.

== Career ==
Aguino signed for Marítimo in January 2009. He made his debut on 1 February against Naval, coming on as a substitute and scoring the winning goal in the 88th minute, in the 1–0 victory.

After a short spell at Portuguese club, he returned to Paraguay for Nacional Asunción in August 2009.

On 26 December 2016, it was reported that he signed for the K League Challenge side Seoul E-Land. However, the transfer did not go through and on 30 December 2016, he signed for Deportivo Táchira.
