= Junior Etoundi =

French footballer (born 1999)

Personal information
- Full name: Junior Etoundi Tsimi
- Date of birth: 30 January 1999 (age 27)
- Place of birth: Yaoundé, Cameroon
- Position: Midfielder

Youth career
- 2010–2015: Strasbourg
- 2015–2017: Metz

Senior career*
Years	Team	Apps	(Gls)
2017	Dinamo Brest	1	(0)
2019–2020	União Madeira	8	(1)
2020	Covilhã	0	(0)
2020–2021	SV Linx		
2021	FA Illkirch Graffenstaden	2	(0)
2022–2023	FC Bassecourt	15	(0)
- * Club domestic league appearances and goals as of 31 July 2023

Junior Etoundi (born 30 January 1999) is a French professional footballer.

== Career ==
=== Covilhã ===
On 31 January 2020 Covilhã confirmed, that they had signed Etoundi.
