= Óscar González (Venezuelan footballer) =

Venezuelan footballer (born 1992)

Personal information
- Full name: Óscar Constantino González Rengifo
- Date of birth: 25 January 1992 (age 34)
- Place of birth: Zaraza, Venezuela
- Height: 1.86 m (6 ft 1 in)
- Position: Defender

Team information
- Current team: Portuguesa
- Number: 14

Senior career*
Years	Team	Apps	(Gls)
2013	Atlético El Vigía	7	(1)
2013–2014	Trujillanos	31	(5)
2014–2016	Deportivo La Guaira	66	(3)
2017–2024	Monagas	129	(6)
2019	→ Independiente del Valle (loan)	9	(0)
2025	Academia Puerto Cabello	9	(0)
2025	Estudiantes de Mérida	11	(0)
2026-	Portuguesa	6	(0)

International career^{‡}
2021–	Venezuela	8	(0)
- * Club domestic league appearances and goals as of 11 March 2026 ‡ National team caps and goals as of 18:37, 30 January 2022 (UTC)

Óscar Constantino González Rengifo (born 25 January 1992) is a Venezuelan professional footballer who plays as a defender for Portuguesa and the Venezuela national team.

== International career ==
He was first called up to the Venezuela national football team in February 2015 for friendlies against Honduras, but did not play.

He made his debut on 2 September 2021 in a World Cup qualifier against Argentina, a 1–3 home defeat. He started the game and played the whole match.
