= Ágnel Flores =

Venezuelan footballer (born 1989)

Personal information
- Full name: Ágnel José Flores Hernández
- Date of birth: 20 May 1989 (age 37)
- Place of birth: Bolívar, Venezuela
- Height: 1.79 m (5 ft 10 in)
- Position: Midfielder

Senior career*
Years	Team	Apps	(Gls)
2007–2012	Mineros de Guayana	54	(4)
2008–2009	→ AC Minervén (loan)	27	(2)
2012–2017	Deportivo Táchira	107	(1)
2017–2018	Monagas	35	(2)
2019–2020	Atlético Venezuela	44	(0)
2021	Deportivo La Guaira	19	(0)
2022	Deportivo Lara	12	(1)

International career^{‡}
2010–2018	Venezuela	24	(0)
- * Club domestic league appearances and goals as of 18 February 2019 ‡ National team caps and goals as of 18 February 2019

Ágnel José Flores Hernández (born 29 May 1989) is a Venezuelan international footballer as a midfielder.

== Club career ==
Flores has played for Mineros de Guayana and AC Minervén.

For the new season 2012–13, Deportivo Táchira signed Flores on a 3-year contract.

== International career ==
He made his international debut for Venezuela in 2010, and played at the 2009 FIFA U-20 World Cup.
