= Aldhair Molina =

Mexican footballer (born 1999)

Personal information
- Full name: Aldhair Fernando Molina Fabián
- Date of birth: 4 April 1999 (age 27)
- Place of birth: Acapulco, Guerrero, Mexico
- Height: 1.74 m (5 ft 9 in)
- Position: Defender

Team information
- Current team: Inter Playa

Youth career
- 2013–2014: Club Chilpancingo
- 2014–2016: UNAM
- 2016–2018: Pachuca
- 2018–2019: Puebla
- 2020: UNAM

Senior career*
Years	Team	Apps	(Gls)
2018–2019	Puebla	3	(0)
2020	→ Pumas Tabasco (loan)	1	(0)
2021	Cuautla	8	(0)
2021–2022	Tlaxcala	28	(0)
2023–	Inter Playa	0	(0)
- * Club domestic league appearances and goals as of 24 April 2022

Aldhair Fernando Molina Fabián (born 4 April 1999) is a Mexican professional footballer who plays as a defender.
