= Wilson Gutiérrez =

Colombian football manager

Personal information
- Full name: Wilson Jaime Gutiérrez Cardona
- Date of birth: 5 May 1971 (age 55)
- Place of birth: Bogotá, Colombia

Managerial career
- Years: Team
- 2010: Juventud Soacha
- 2011–2014: Independiente Santa Fe
- 2014: Deportivo Pasto
- 2016: Llaneros
- 2016–2017: Oriente Petrolero
- 2018: Carabobo
- 2019–2020: Alianza
- 2021: Alianza Petrolera

Wilson Gutiérrez (born 5 May 1971) is a Colombian football manager and former player.

He is best known for coaching Independiente Santa Fe, and with this team, winning the 2012 Apertura tournament. It was the team's seventh title, but the first since 1975. The club then qualified for the 2013 Copa Libertadores.

He spent his active career in CD El Cóndor, Santa Fe, Atlético Huila and La Equidad until retiring in 2005.

== Personal life ==
He grew up in the Pontevedra neighborhood of Bogotá. He is nicknamed "El Flaco", albeit mostly to his closest friends. After leaving Alianza Petrolera in 2021, he moved to Miami, Florida to be close to his children, who already lived there.
