= Ángel Lezama =

Venezuelan footballer (born 1997)

Personal information
- Date of birth: 25 September 1997 (age 29)
- Place of birth: Ciudad Bolívar, Venezuela
- Position: Midfielder

Team information
- Current team: FC Jazz

Senior career*
Years	Team	Apps	(Gls)
2015–2016	Mineros de Guayana	31	(0)
2016	→ Deportivo de Guayana (loan)	6	(0)
2017	Monagas	29	(0)
2018–2020	Táchira	8	(1)
2018	→ Chicó de Guayana (loan)	0	(0)
2019	→ Carabobo (loan)	33	(4)
2020	Yaracuyanos	1	(0)
2020–2021	FK Riteriai	26	(8)
2023–	FC Jazz		
- * Club domestic league appearances and goals as of 29 March 2023

Ángel Ronniel Lezama Arteaga (born 25 September 1997) is a Venezuelan footballer who plays as a midfielder for FC Jazz in the Finnish third tier Kakkonen.

== Career ==
Lezama played in the Venezuelan Primera División before joining the Lithuanian A Lyga side FK Riteriai in July 2020. Lezama made 26 league appearances and scored 8 goals. In the 2020–21 UEFA Europa League qualification he scored against Slovan Bratislava. In September 2021, Riteriai released Lezama due to disciplinary reasons. After his spell in Lithuania, Lezama was out of contract until March 2023 when he was signed by FC Jazz.
