= Anthony Blondell =

Venezuelan footballer (born 1994)

Personal information
- Full name: Anthony Miguel Blondell Blondell
- Date of birth: May 17, 1994 (age 32)
- Place of birth: Cumaná, Venezuela
- Height: 1.86 m (6 ft 1 in)
- Position: Forward

Senior career*
Years	Team	Apps	(Gls)
2012−2014	Yaracuyanos	40	(5)
2014−2016	Zamora	32	(5)
2016	Zamora B	7	(2)
2017	Monagas	39	(24)
2018−2019	Vancouver Whitecaps FC	18	(1)
2019	→ Huachipato (loan)	16	(4)
2020–2022	Huachipato	0	(0)
2020	→ Arouca (loan)	9	(2)
2021	→ Cova Piedade (loan)	8	(1)
2021–	→ Deportivo Pasto (loan)	7	(3)
2022–2023	Monagas	8	(1)

International career
2017−2018	Venezuela	1	(0)
- * Club domestic league appearances and goals as of 19:40, May 2, 2021 (UTC)

Anthony Miguel Blondell Blondell (born May 17, 1994) is a Venezuelan footballer who plays as a forward.

== Career ==
Blondell began his career with Yaracuyanos, before moving to Zamora and later Monagas in 2017. Blondell scored 23 goals in 37 appearances for Monagas, which led the Venezuelan Primera División in 2017, helping Monagas SC capture the Torneo Apertura title and advance to the Torneo Clausura semifinal.

His play with Monagas led to a move to Major League Soccer side Vancouver Whitecaps FC on November 30, 2017. FC Dallas received $50,000 in general allocation money for his MLS rights.
