= Daniel Febles =

Venezuelan footballer (born 1991)

Personal information
- Full name: Daniel Ricardo Febles Argüelles
- Date of birth: 8 February 1991 (age 35)
- Place of birth: Caracas, Venezuela
- Height: 1.82 m (5 ft 11 1/2 in)
- Position: Forward

Team information
- Current team: Unión Sur Yaiza

Youth career
- 2007–2010: Caracas

Senior career*
Years	Team	Apps	(Gls)
2009–2013	Caracas	26	(2)
2012	→ Aragua (loan)	14	(1)
2014–2015	Atlético Venezuela	48	(3)
2015–2018	Deportivo Táchira	25	(2)
2017	→ Monagas (loan)	42	(9)
2018	Seoul E-Land	5	(0)
2018–2019	Guabirá	14	(1)
2019	Carabobo	27	(2)
2020–2022	Aragua	41	(0)
2022–2023	Dhaka Mohammedan	11	(2)
2023-2024	Città d'Isernia	?	(?)
2024–2025	Lanzarote	23	(0)
2025–	Unión Sur Yaiza	1	(0)

International career
- Venezuela U20
- * Club domestic league appearances and goals as of 6 September 2025

Daniel Ricardo Febles Argüelles (born 8 February 1991) is a Venezuelan professional footballer who plays as a forward for Spanish Tercera Federación club Unión Sur Yaiza. He is the son of the former Venezuelan player Pedro Febles.
