= 2016 Copa Venezuela =

Tournament details
- Country: Venezuela
- Dates: 28 June 2016 – 19 October 2016
- Teams: 34

Final positions
- Champions: Zulia
- Runners-up: Estudiantes de Caracas
- Copa Sudamericana: Estudiantes de Caracas
- All statistics correct as of 19 October 2016.

The 2016 Copa Venezuela is the 47th edition of the competition. It began with the First Round on 28 June 2016, and concluded with the final on 19 October 2016. The winner will qualify for the 2017 Copa Sudamericana.

Venezuelan Primera División side Deportivo La Guaira were the defending champions after they beat Deportivo Lara 1–0 on aggregate in the previous final in October 2015, but they were eliminated by Universidad Central in the second round. Zulia won the competition after defeating Estudiantes de Caracas 2–0 on aggregate score in the final.

== Round dates ==
Phase	Round	First leg	Second leg
Main tournament	First Round	28 June 2016	6 July 2016
Main tournament	Second Round	13 July 2016	27 July 2016
Main tournament	Round of 16	10 August 2016	24 August 2016
Main tournament	Quarterfinals	4 September 2016	7 September 2016
Main tournament	Semifinals	21 September 2016	5 October 2016
Main tournament	Finals	12 October 2016	19 October 2016

== Matches ==
=== First round ===
- Teams entering this round: 8 teams from Venezuelan Primera División and 6 teams from Venezuelan Segunda División.
- The first legs took place on 28 June 2016, while the second legs were played on 6 July 2016.

Team 1	Agg.	Team 2	1st leg	2nd leg
Oriental Group
Arroceros de Calabozo	1–6	Atlético Venezuela	0–2	1–4
Gran Valencia	0–10	Monagas	0–4	0–6
Estudiantes de Caracas	1–0	Petare	1–0	0–0
Occidental Group
Real Frontera	3–2	Ureña	2–0	1–2
Titanes	1–0	Estudiantes de Mérida	0–0	1–0
Policía de Lara	1–10	Portuguesa	1–5	0–5
Potros de Barinas	1–5	Llaneros de Guanare	1–2	0–3

Source: Soccerway

=== Second round ===
- Teams entering this round: 12 teams from Venezuelan Primera División and 13 teams from Venezuelan Segunda División.
- The first legs took place on 13 July 2016, while the second legs took place on 27 July 2016.

Team 1	Agg.	Team 2	1st leg	2nd leg
Oriental Group
Universidad Central	2–2 (3–1 p)	Deportivo La Guaira	1–1	1–1
Margarita	0–4	Deportivo Anzoátegui	0–2	0–2
Angostura	2–5	Mineros de Guayana	2–4	0–1
Tucanes de Amazonas	2–0	Caracas	2–0	0–0
Metropolitanos	1–3	Aragua	1–1	0–2
Petroleros de Anzoátegui	1–4	Atlético Venezuela	1–2	0–2
Diamantes de Guayana	1–6	Monagas	1–2	0–4
AC Lala	4–5	Estudiantes de Caracas	4–2	0–3
Occidental Group
Atlético Socopó	4–6	Zamora	2–2	2–4
Real Frontera	0–4	Deportivo Táchira	0–2	0–2
Atlético El Vigía	3–1	Titanes	3–0	0–1
Unión Atlético Falcón	1–8	Zulia	0–4	1–4
Yaracuyanos	1–0	Carabobo	1–0	0–0
Academia Puerto Cabello	0–4	Deportivo Lara	0–0	0–4
Trujillanos	1–2	Deportivo JBL del Zulia	0–1	1–1
Portuguesa	5–3	Llaneros de Guanare	2–1	3–2

Source: Soccerway

=== Round of 16 ===
The first legs took place from 10 August 2016 to 28 August 2016, while the second legs took place from 24 August 2016 to 31 August 2016.

Team 1	Agg.	Team 2	1st leg	2nd leg
Oriental Group
Estudiantes de Caracas	5–4	Universidad Central	2–2	3–2
Aragua	1–2	Tucanes de Amazonas	1–1	0–1
Atlético Venezuela	2–1	Mineros de Guayana	2–1	0–0
Monagas	2–3	Deportivo Anzoátegui	2–2	0–1
Occidental Group
Portuguesa	0–1	Zamora	0–1	0–0
Yaracuyanos	2–6	Zulia	2–1	0–5
Deportivo Lara	3–2	Atlético El Vigía	1–1	2–1
Deportivo JBL del Zulia	1–4	Deportivo Táchira	1–3	0–1

Source: Soccerway

=== Quarterfinals ===
The first legs were played on 4 September 2016, while the second legs took place on 7 September 2016.

Team 1	Agg.	Team 2	1st leg	2nd leg
Oriental Group
Tucanes de Amazonas	2–2 (a)	Deportivo Anzoátegui	1–0	1–2
Atlético Venezuela	0–1	Estudiantes de Caracas	0–1	0–0
Occidental Group
Deportivo Lara	2–1	Zamora	0–0	2–1
Zulia	3–3 (a)	Deportivo Táchira	1–0	2–3

Source: Soccerway

=== Semifinals ===
The first legs were played on 21 September 2016, with the second legs taking place on 5 October 2016.

Team 1	Agg.	Team 2	1st leg	2nd leg
Oriental Group
Tucanes de Amazonas	1–1 (2–4 p)	Estudiantes de Caracas	1–0	0–1
Occidental Group
Zulia	2–2 (a)	Deportivo Lara	0–0	2–2

Source: Soccerway

=== Finals ===
The first leg was played on 12 October 2016, with the second leg taking place on 19 October 2016.

Team 1	Agg.	Team 2	1st leg	2nd leg
Estudiantes de Caracas	0–2	Zulia	0–0	0–2

Source: Soccerway
