= Kingsley Agbodike =

Nigerian footballer (born 1999)

Personal information
- Date of birth: 15 January 1999 (age 27)
- Place of birth: Nnewi, Nigeria
- Height: 1.87 m (6 ft 1 1/2 in)
- Position: Forward

Team information
- Current team: KS Kastrioti
- Number: 19

Youth career
- FC Bethel

Senior career*
Years	Team	Apps	(Gls)
2017–2018	FK Egnatia	18	(5)
2018–2019	Tomori Berat	14	(3)
2019–	KS Kastrioti	0	(0)
- * Club domestic league appearances and goals as of 14:44, 9 March 2019 (UTC)

Kingsley Agbodike (born 15 January 1999), also known as Kingsley Ogbodike, is a Nigerian footballer who currently plays as a forward for KS Kastrioti.

== Career statistics ==
=== Club ===
As of 9 March 2019.

Club	Season	League			Cup		Continental		Other		Total	
Club	Season	Division	Apps	Goals	Apps	Goals	Apps	Goals	Apps	Goals	Apps	Goals
FK Egnatia	2017–18	Albanian First Division	18	5	0	0	–		0	0	18	5
Tomori Berat	2018–19	Albanian First Division	14	3	0	0	–		0	0	14	3
KS Kastrioti	2018–19	Albanian Superliga	0	0	1 (Note: Appearances in the Albanian Cup)	0	–		0	0	1	0
Career total			32	8	1	0	0	0	0	0	33	8
