= Patrice Sousia =

Cameroonian footballer

Personal information
- Date of birth: 18 January 1999 (age 27)
- Place of birth: Douala, Cameroon
- Position: Forward

Team information
- Current team: Sedan

Youth career
- Samuel Eto'o Academy
- 2012–2015: Barcelona
- 2017–2018: Barcelona
- 2017–2018: → Damm (youth loan)

Senior career*
Years	Team	Apps	(Gls)
2018–2019	Minerva	6	(0)
2019	Tenisca	11	(2)
2020–2021	Calahorra B	21	(3)
2022–2023	Mollerussa	21	(3)
2025–	Sedan B	9	(1)

International career
2018	Cameroon U20		
- * Club domestic league appearances and goals

Patrice Sousia (born 18 January 1999) is a Cameroonian footballer who plays as a forward for French club Sedan.

== Club career ==
Born in Douala, Cameroon, Sousia began his career at the Samuel Eto'o Academy, before moving to Spain to join Barcelona in 2012. However, due to his age at the time of signing, this deal came under scrutiny from international body FIFA, who sanctioned Barcelona for the transfer, handing Sousia a ban until he turned eighteen. He was later told by FIFA that he was unable to train at Barcelona's facilities, nor live on the La Masia campus.

After being kicked out of the club, and made homeless by the FIFA verdict, teammate Álex Collado's family offered Sousia refuge, welcoming him into their home. While staying with the Collados, Sousia trained with Prat, the club Álex's brother, Jonathan, played for. At Prat, he was helped by teammate Federico Bessone and manager Pedro Dólera to settle and come to terms with the situation.

He stayed with the Collados for a few weeks, before moving into the Joaquim Blume d'Esplugues - a residence for athletes. On his eighteenth birthday, Sousia returned to Barcelona, who had been covering his expenses while he was banned. However, his return was not seen as successful by his coaches, who told him after three months that he would be sold in the summer. Following interest from Cornellà and Damm, he joined the latter on loan in late 2017.

After leaving Barcelona, he played for Tercera División sides Minerva and Tenisca. In July 2020, Sousia signed for Calahorra, being assigned to the club's B team.

After over a year without a club, Sousia joined French club Sedan, being assigned to the club's 'B' team in the Régional 3. He scored on his debut against Betheny in a 4–1 win on 24 August 2025.

== International career ==
In 2018, Sousia was called up to the Cameroon national under-20 football team.

== Career statistics ==
=== Club ===
As of 1 March 2026

Club	Season	League			Cup		Other		Total	
Club	Season	Division	Apps	Goals	Apps	Goals	Apps	Goals	Apps	Goals
Minerva	2018–19	Tercera División	6	0	0	0	0	0	6	0
Tenisca	2018–19	Tercera División	11	2	0	0	0	0	11	2
Calahorra B	2020–21	Tercera División	21	3	0	0	0	0	21	3
Mollerussa	2021–22	Primera Catalana	11	1	0	0	0	0	11	1
Mollerussa	2022–23	Primera Catalana	10	2	2 (Note: Appearances in the Copa del Rey)	0	2 (Note: Appearances in the Copa Lleida Amater)	2	14	4
Mollerussa	Total		21	3	2	0	2	2	25	5
Sedan B	2025–26	Régional 3 - Grand Est	9	1	0	0	0	0	9	1
Career total			68	9	2	0	2	2	72	11
