= Edriss Hushmand =

Swedish-Afghan footballer

Personal information
- Date of birth: 1 May 1999 (age 27)
- Place of birth: Malmö, Sweden
- Height: 1.73 m (5 ft 8 in)
- Position: Midfielder

Senior career*
Years	Team	Apps	(Gls)
2016–2017	BK Olympic	14	(0)
2017	Trelleborg	0	(0)
2018	BK Olympic	8	(0)
2018–2019	Ariana FC	11	(7)
2019	IFK Malmö	12	(3)
2020	BK Olympic	10	(1)
2021	Ariana FC	20	(3)
2022	FC Rosengård 1917	13	(2)
2023–	Ariana FC	12	(0)

International career^{‡}
2016	Afghanistan	1	(0)
- * Club domestic league appearances and goals as of 17:44, 24 April 2024 (UTC) ‡ National team caps and goals as of 17:44, 24 April 2024 (UTC)

Edriss Hushmand (born 1 May 1999) is a footballer who plays for Swedish club Ariana FC as a midfielder. Born in Sweden, he represented Afghanistan at international level.

== Career ==
Born in Malmö, Hushmand has played for BK Olympic, Trelleborg, Ariana FC, IFK Malmö and FC Rosengård 1917, and made one appearance for the Afghanistan national football team. In April 2024, he was charged with raping two minors.
