= Ottavio Misefari =

Italian footballer and manager

Personal information
- Full name: Ottaviano Garibaldi Misefari
- Date of birth: 1 February 1909
- Place of birth: Palizzi, Italy
- Date of death: 6 January 1999 (aged 89)
- Place of death: Reggio Calabria, Italy
- Position: Forward

Youth career
- ????–1924: Giovani Calciatori Reggio

Senior career*
| Years | Team | Apps | (Gls) |
| 1924–1925 | Reggina | | |
| 1925–???? | Messina | | |
| ????–???? | Reggina | | |

Managerial career
- 1944–1945: Reggina
- * Club domestic league appearances and goals

Ottaviano Garibaldi Misefari, better known as Ottavio Misefari (1 February 1909 – 6 January 1999) was an Italian association football player and manager.

In February 1925 he was the first player in history (along with Pasquale Rattotti) to move from Reggina to Messina, two rival teams in Italy (they play the "Derby dello Stretto").

Misefari was the Reggina manager during the 1944-1945 season.
