= Caio Felipe (footballer, born April 1999) =

Brazilian footballer (born 1999)

Personal information
- Full name: Caio Felipe dos Santos Silva
- Date of birth: 16 April 1999 (age 27)
- Place of birth: Alagoinhas, Brazil
- Height: 1.78 m (5 ft 10 in)
- Position: Defender

Senior career*
Years	Team	Apps	(Gls)
2017–2019	Sport Recife	4	(0)
2020	URT	2	(0)
2021	Grêmio Anápolis	1	(0)
2022–2023	Itabaiana	13	(0)
2022	→ Moto Club (loan)	12	(0)
2022	→ Contagem (loan)		
2023	→ Cruzeiro de Arapiraca (loan)	12	(0)
- * Club domestic league appearances and goals as of 23 July 2023

Caio Felipe dos Santos Silva (born 16 April 1999), commonly known as Caio Felipe, is a Brazilian footballer who plays as a defender.

== Career statistics ==
=== Club ===
As of 13 June 2018.

Club	Season	League			State League		Cup		Continental		Other		Total	
Club	Season	Division	Apps	Goals	Apps	Goals	Apps	Goals	Apps	Goals	Apps	Goals	Apps	Goals
Sport Recife	2017	Série A	0	0	4 (Note: Appearances in the Campeonato Pernambucano)	0	0	0	0	0	1 (Note: Appearances in the Copa do Nordeste)	0	5	0
Sport Recife	2018	Série A	0	0	0	0	0	0	0	0	0	0	0	0
Career total			0	0	4	0	1	0	0	0	0	0	5	0
