= Richard Blanco (footballer) =

Venezuelan footballer (born 1982)

Personal information
- Full name: Richard José Blanco Delgado
- Date of birth: 21 January 1982 (age 44)
- Place of birth: La Guaira, Venezuela
- Height: 1.83 m (6 ft 0 in)
- Position: Striker

Team information
- Current team: Metropolitanos

Senior career*
Years	Team	Apps	(Gls)
2004–2005	Italchacao	20	(5)
2006–2007	San Marino	17	(8)
2007	Carabobo	23	(7)
2008	Estrella Roja	29	(14)
2009–2011	Deportivo Petare	84	(33)
2012	O'Higgins	26	(9)
2013–2016	Mineros de Guayana	122	(59)
2016	Zamora	18	(9)
2017–2020	Mineros de Guayana	120	(52)
2021	Academia Puerto Cabello	23	(8)
2022–2023	Mineros de Guayana	39	(19)
2023-2024	Portuguesa	29	(11)
2024	Carabobo	16	(1)
2025	Rayo Zuliano	9	(2)
2025-	Metropolitanos	3	(1)

International career^{‡}
2008–2016	Venezuela	16	(2)
- * Club domestic league appearances and goals as of 15 July 2012 ‡ National team caps and goals as of 30 March 2016

Richard José Blanco Delgado (Spanish pronunciation: [riˈtʃaɾθ xoˈse ˈβlaŋko], born 21 January 1982) is a Venezuelan footballer that currently plays for Primera División club Metropolitanos as striker.

== Career ==
=== O'Higgins ===
In 2012, Blanco was runner-up with O'Higgins, after lose the final against Universidad de Chile in the penalty shoot-out.

He participated with the club in the 2012 Copa Sudamericana where they faced Cerro Porteño, being eliminated in the first round. Blanco scored two goals in the first leg in Rancagua, and was chosen the Best Player of the Week.

On December 12, 2012, Blanco was signed for Mineros de Guayana.

== International career ==
Blanco has played in the Venezuela national football team since 2010, scoring 2 goals.

=== International goals ===
Goal	Date	Venue	Opponent	Score	Result	Competition
1	4 February 2015	Estadio Olímpico Metropolitano, San Pedro Sula, Honduras	Honduras	0–1	2–3	Friendly
2	12 November 2015	Estadio Hernando Siles, La Paz, Bolivia	Bolivia	4–2	4–2	2018 FIFA World Cup qualification

== Honours ==
Mineros de Guayana

- Venezuelan Primera División: 2013–14 Apertura
