= José Miguel Reyes =

Venezuelan footballer (born 1992)

Personal information
- Date of birth: 19 September 1992 (age 34)
- Place of birth: Valencia, Venezuela
- Height: 1.72 m (5 ft 7 1/2 in)
- Position: Striker

Team information
- Current team: Aragua

Senior career*
Years	Team	Apps	(Gls)
2009–2010	Zulia	3	(1)
2010–2011	Carabobo	33	(3)
2011–2013	Deportivo Anzoátegui	33	(5)
2013–2019	Deportivo Táchira	139	(41)
2017–2018	→ ACD Lara (loan)	31	(2)
2020	→ Monagas (loan)	5	(1)
2021	Deportivo La Guaira	31	(10)
2022–	Aragua	3	(0)

International career^{‡}
2011–	Venezuela	2	(0)
2011–	Venezuela U20	4	(1)
- * Club domestic league appearances and goals as of 11:44, 8 April 2013 (UTC) ‡ National team caps and goals as of 11:44, 8 April 2013 (UTC)

José Miguel Reyes (born 19 September 1992) is a Venezuelan international footballer who plays for Aragua, as a striker.

== Career ==
Reyes was born in Valencia, Venezuela. He has played club football for Zulia, Carabobo, Deportivo Anzoátegui and Deportivo Táchira.

He played for the Venezuela under-20 team at the 2011 South American Youth Championship scoring against Uruguay, and made his international debut for the senior Venezuela team in March 2011 in a friendly match against Argentina.
