= Brígido Iriarte Stadium =

Football stadium in Caracas, Venezuela

Coordinates: 10°28′58″N 66°56′30″W

Estadio Brígido Iriarte
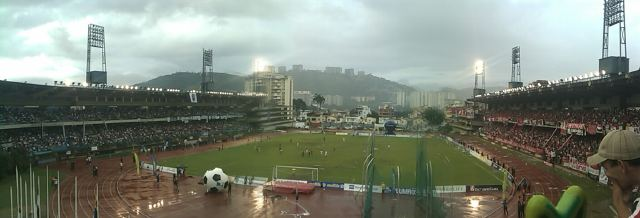
- Estadio Brígido Iriarte
- Interactive map of Estadio Brígido Iriarte
- Location: Caracas, Venezuela
- Owner: Instituto Nacional de Deportes de Venezuela
- Capacity: 10,000

Construction
- Opened: 1983
- Renovated: 2007

Tenants
- Atlético Venezuela; Estudiantes de Caracas; Metropolitanos

Estadio Brígido Iriarte is a multi-purpose stadium in Caracas, Venezuela. It is currently used mostly for football matches and is the home stadium of Venezuelan Primera División team Atlético Venezuela, as well as second-tier league team Estudiantes de Caracas. The stadium currently holds 10,000 people. The stadium was named after the decathlete Brígido Iriarte.

It was completely renovated in 2007.
