= Christian Novoa =

Venezuelan footballer (born 1991)

Personal information
- Full name: Christian Novoa Sandin
- Date of birth: 9 July 1991 (age 35)
- Place of birth: Caracas, Venezuela
- Height: 1.72 m (5 ft 8 in)
- Position: Forward

Team information
- Current team: Santa Coloma
- Number: 24

Senior career*
Years	Team	Apps	(Gls)
2010–2014	Caracas	11	(0)
2011–2012	→ Yaracuyanos (loan)	14	(0)
2012	→ Atlético Miranda (loan)		
2013–2014	→ Carabobo (loan)	30	(10)
2014–2015	Doxa Katokopia	16	(1)
2015	Metropolitanos	12	(0)
2016–2017	Carabobo	63	(22)
2018–2019	The Strongest	36	(11)
2019	UB Conquense	8	(0)
2019	Indy Eleven	11	(1)
2020–2021	Monagas	10	(3)
2021–2022	Carabobo	15	(1)
2022–	Santa Coloma	65	(35)
- * Club domestic league appearances and goals as of 10 June 2025

Christian Novoa Sandin (born 9 July 1991), simply known as Christian Novoa, is a Venezuelan professional footballer who plays for Santa Coloma as a forward.

== Career ==
In Venezuela, Novoa played for Caracas between 2010 and 2014 and was loaned to various clubs. He spent the 2013–14 on loan at Carabobo and subsequently scored 10 goals for the club in 30 appearances. On 26 May 2014, he signed for Doxa Katokopias in Cypriot First Division. On 12 August 2019, he signed with the Indy Eleven of the USL Championship .
