= Deportivo Socopó FC =

Venezuelan football club

Deportivo Socopó
- Full name: Deportivo Socopó Fútbol Club
- Nickname: El Verdinegro
- Founded: October 17, 2001; 25 years ago
- Ground: Rogelio Matos; Socopó, Barinas, Venezuela
- Capacity: 7,500
- Chairman: Gabriel García Bracamonte
- Manager: Fernando Capobianco
- League: Venezuelan Tercera División
- 2017: Primera División, 18th (relegated)
- Website: http://atleticosocopo.com.ve/
Home colours	Away colours

Deportivo Socopó Fútbol Club (formerly Atlético Socopó Fútbol Club), is a professional football club based in Socopó, Barinas, Venezuela which plays in the Tercera División.

In 2018, Libertador their place in the Segunda División. Atlético Socopó later resurged with a new organization named Deportivo Socopó FC, and started playing in the Tercera División.
