= Luz Rodríguez (footballer) =

Mexican footballer, born 1991

Luz Rodriguez
Personal information
- Full name: Luz Lorenzo Rodriguez Hernandez
- Date of birth: 27 May 1991 (age 35)
- Place of birth: Mexico
- Position: Forward

Senior career*
Years	Team	Apps	(Gls)
-2010	C. F. Millonarios de la Joya	19	(8)
2010-2011	F.C. Excelsior	5	(0)
2013-2014	Potros UAEM	15	(0)
-2016	Miami United F.C.		
2016-	Estudiantes de Mérida F.C.	68	(15)
- * Club domestic league appearances and goals

Luz Rodriguez (born 27 May 1991) is a Mexican footballer who plays for Estudiantes de Mérida in Venezuela.

== Career ==
Rodriguez started his senior career with C. F. Millonarios de la Joya. After that, he played for Excelsior, Potroes UAEM, and Miami United. In 2016, he signed for Estudiantes de Mérida in the Venezuelan Primera División, where he has made seventy-three appearances and scored sixteen goals.
