= Aquiles Ocanto =

Venezuelan footballer (born 1988)

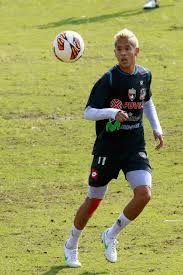

Personal information
- Full name: Aquiles David Ocanto Querales
- Date of birth: 18 November 1988 (age 37)
- Place of birth: Barquisimeto, Venezuela
- Height: 1.81 m (5 ft 11 in)
- Position: Forward

Team information
- Current team: Monagas

Senior career*
Years	Team	Apps	(Gls)
2007–2014	ACD Lara	147	(29)
2014	Juventude	2	(0)
2014–2019	Carabobo	152	(49)
2019	Deportivo Táchira	22	(3)
2020–2021	Deportivo La Guaira	26	(9)
2022–	Monagas	3	(2)

International career
2015–	Venezuela	1	(0)
- * Club domestic league appearances and goals as of 16:04, 27 August 2020 (UTC)

Aquiles David Ocanto Querales (born 18 November 1988) is a Venezuelan football striker who currently plays for Monagas.
