= Edder Farías =

Venezuelan footballer (born 1988)

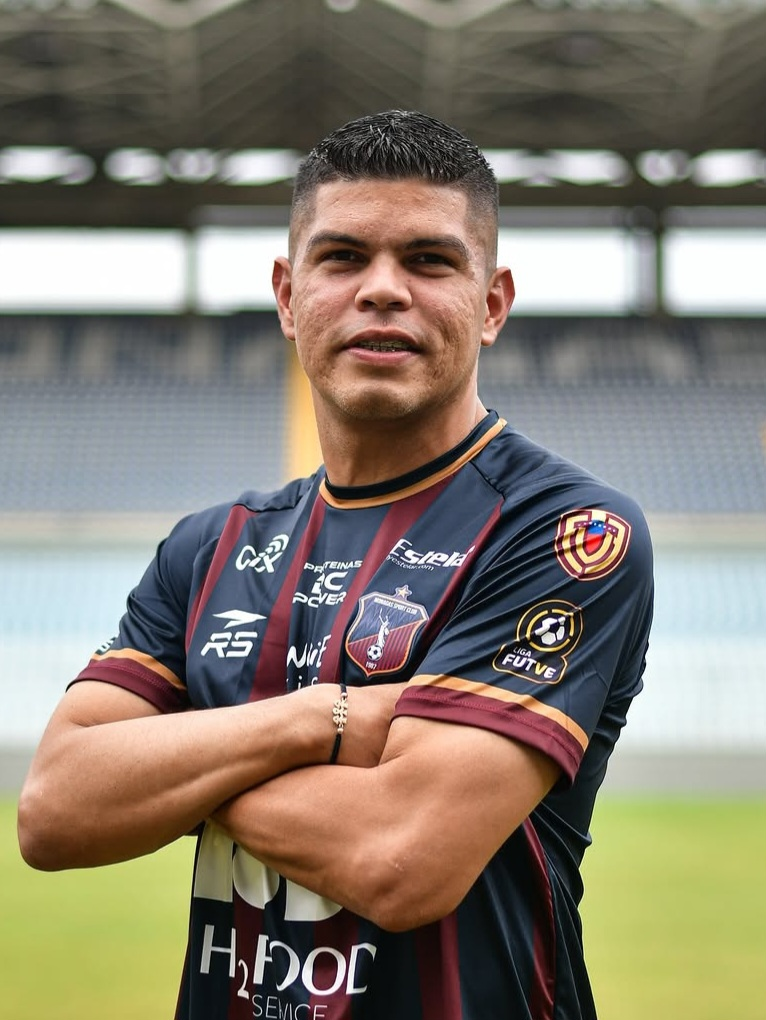

Personal information
- Full name: Edder José Farías Martínez
- Date of birth: 12 April 1988 (age 38)
- Place of birth: Maturín, Venezuela
- Height: 1.88 m (6 ft 2 in)
- Position: Forward

Team information
- Current team: Monagas
- Number: 27

Senior career*
Years	Team	Apps	(Gls)
2008–2012	Monagas	103	(40)
2012–2017	Caracas	111	(62)
2015–2016	→ União (loan)	12	(1)
2017–2018	→ Once Caldas (loan)	37	(15)
2018–2020	Atlético Venezuela	56	(37)
2019	→ Atlético Junior (loan)	10	(0)
2021	Universidad Católica	25	(5)
2022-2023	Deportivo Tachira	33	(5)
2023-2025	Deportivo La Guaira	42	(14)
2025-	Monagas	37	(8)

International career^{‡}
2010–2015	Venezuela	9	(2)
- * Club domestic league appearances and goals as of 10 November 2026 ‡ National team caps and goals as of 11 February 2015

Edder José Farías Martínez (born 12 April 1988) is a Venezuelan footballer who plays as a forward for Monagas.

He began his career at Monagas, playing four Primera División Venezolana seasons before a transfer to Caracas in 2012. He has totalled over 125 goals and over 250 appearances in the league, also representing Atlético Venezuela. He added 47 games and 12 goals in Colombia's Categoría Primera A, for Once Caldas and Atlético Junior, and also had a loan at União da Madeira in Portugal's Primeira Liga.

Farías earned nine caps and scored twice for Venezuela between 2010 and 2015.

== Club career ==
=== Monagas ===
Born in Maturín, Monagas, Farías began his career at hometown club Monagas Sport Club in the 2008–09 season of the Primera División Venezolana, scoring 8 goals in 27 games in his debut campaign and 9 in 31 in the next.

On 10 April 2011, he came on as a half-time substitute for Edward Leonett and was sent off in the 74th minute for a second booking in an eventual 1–1 draw at Deportivo Petare; on 8 May that season, he scored a hat-trick in a 3–1 win at ACD Lara.

=== Caracas ===
Two Chilean clubs and Caracas FC tracked Farías in May 2012. Due to an anterior cruciate ligament injury on 13 July, he did not sign a contract at the capital-based club until 11 December, linking up on a deal until 2015.

On 12 March 2013, Farías netted his first goal for Caracas, the winner in a 2–1 triumph over Grêmio Foot-Ball Porto Alegrense at the Estadio Olímpico in the season's Copa Libertadores. He scored his first league goals for his new club two weeks later, a hat-trick at Portuguesa FC in a 4–3 win. On 12 November 2014, Farías was sent off in the 38th minute of a 2–1 loss at Trujillanos FC, for a foul on Luiyi Erazo which required him to be substituted.

On 24 March 2015, Caracas extended Farías' contract until 2017. That 15 August, he was loaned to C.F. União, newly promoted to Portugal's Primeira Liga for the upcoming season. He scored his first goal for the Madeirans on 27 September, a late consolation in their 2–1 loss at GD Estoril.

On 6 July 2017, as top scorer in the ongoing Venezuelan season with 13 goals in 22 games, Farías was loaned to Once Caldas of Colombia. After scoring eight goals in the 2018 season, he became too valuable for the club to purchase, and his loan was rescinded on 22 May.

=== Atlético Venezuela ===
On 13 July 2018, Farías signed a two-year contract at Atlético Venezuela CF. In the 2019 Apertura season, he was top scorer with 18 goals in 21 games for the quarter-finalists. This included a hat-trick on 9 February in a 3–2 win at LALA FC for the first victory of the season for the team from Puerto la Cruz.

On 28 June 2019, Farías returned to Colombia, signing a year-long loan with reigning champions Atlético Junior. In December, having not scored for the team from Barranquilla, this was curtailed and he returned to Atlético Venezuela.

=== Universidad Católica ===
On 19 January 2021, Farías signed for C.D. Universidad Católica del Ecuador. He scored a hat-trick on 9 May in a 6–2 win at Mushuc Runa SC.

== International career ==
Farías made his full international debut for Venezuela on 2 February 2010, as an added-time replacement for Alejandro Moreno at the end of a goalless friendly draw against Japan at the Ōita Bank Dome. On 20 May in Oranjestad, he scored his first international goal, concluding a 3–0 win over Aruba.

On 4 February 2015, Farías came off the bench to score in a 3–2 away win over Honduras, breaking a sequence of five consecutive defeats for the Vinotinto with their first victory since September 2013.

=== International goals ===
Scores and results list Venezuela's goal tally first.

Goal	Date	Venue	Opponent	Score	Result	Competition
1.	20 May 2010	Trinidad Stadium, Oranjestad, Aruba	Aruba	3–0	3–0	Friendly
2.	4 February 2015	Estadio Olímpico Metropolitano, San Pedro Sula, Honduras	Honduras	3–0	3–2	Friendly
