= Estudiantes de Caracas S.C. =

Venezuelan football club

Estudiantes de Caracas
- Full name: Estudiantes de Caracas Sport Club
- Nickname(s): Académicos (Academics); Academia capitalina (Capital's Academy); ECSC; Los Blancos (The Whites); Los Leones (The Lions)
- Founded: July 2014; 10 years ago
- Ground: Estadio Brígido Iriarte; Caracas, Venezuela
- Capacity: 10,000
- Chairman: Jorge Peraza
- Manager: José Fasciana
- League: Primera División
- 2017: Segunda División, 1st (champions)
Home colours	Away colours

Estudiantes de Caracas Sport Club is a Venezuelan professional football club based in Caracas. It was established as a professional team in July 2014, debuting in the Venezuelan Segunda División for the 2014–15 season and earning promotion to the top tier at the end of that season. They play their games at the Estadio Brígido Iriarte.

Its major achievements are a runner-up finish at the end of their debut season in the Segunda División, as well as a championship in the same competition in 2017, and a runner-up finish in the 2016 Copa Venezuela, which allowed them to qualify for the 2017 Copa Sudamericana despite being relegated that same season.

== Honours ==
- Venezuelan Segunda División:

Champions (1): 2017
Runners-up (1): 2014–15

- Copa Venezuela:

Runners-up (1): 2016
