= Deportivo JBL del Zulia =

Professional football club in Venezuela

Deportivo JBL
- Full name: Deportivo JBL del Zulia
- Nicknames: Depor; Equipo de la Distribuidora; JBL; Maquinaria Negriazul
- Founded: February 10, 2013; 12 years ago
- Ground: Estadio José Pachencho Romero; Maracaibo, Zulia, Venezuela
- Capacity: 40,800
- Chairman: Roberto González
- Manager: Andrés Peretti Serra
- League: Venezuelan Primera División
- 2017: Primera División, 17th (relegated)
- Website: deportivojbldelzulia.blogspot.com
Home colours	Away colours

Deportivo JBL del Zulia, is a professional football club based in Maracaibo, Zulia, Venezuela. They play at the Estadio José Pachencho Romero.
