= 2026 Copa Venezuela =

Tournament details
- Country: Venezuela
- Dates: 24 June – December 2026
- Teams: 28

Tournament statistics
- Matches played: 66
- Goals scored: 197 (2.98 per match)
- All statistics correct as of 19 November 2026.

The 2026 Copa Venezuela is the 53rd edition of the Venezuelan football cup, which is organized by the Venezuelan Football Federation (FVF). The competition began on 24 June 2026, with the participation of 14 Liga FUTVE and 14 Liga FUTVE 2 teams. The winners will qualify for the 2027 Supercopa de Venezuela against the 2026 Liga FUTVE champions.

Universidad Central are the defending champions, having won the tournament in 2025.

The competition was suspended immediately after its first matchday on 24 June due to the 2026 Venezuela earthquakes, resuming on 18 August 2026 with the second matchday of the group stage.

== Format ==
For this season, the tournament kept the format used in its previous edition, comprising a 20-team group stage and the knockout stages to be contested by 16 teams.

For the group stage, fourteen Liga FUTVE 2 sides and the six Liga FUTVE teams that failed to advance to the final stages of the 2026 Apertura tournament were drawn into five groups of four teams each, in which the teams played each one of their group rivals twice (once at home and once away), with the five group winners and the three best group runners-up advancing to the knockout stage.

The eight teams advancing out of the group stage will be joined in the round of 16 by the eight Liga FUTVE sides that played the final stages of the 2026 Apertura tournament, which received a bye to this round. All the knockout rounds (round of 16, quarter-finals, semi-finals, and final) were set to be played over two legs, however, due to the temporary suspension of the competition, it was confirmed that the knockout rounds would be played over a single match.

== Teams ==
Twenty-eight teams entered this edition of the competition: the fourteen Liga FUTVE teams and fourteen from Liga FUTVE 2. Reserve sides competing in the second-tier league were excluded from the tournament.

Marítimo de La Guaira withdrew from the competition after suspending its operations due to the impact of the 2026 Venezuela earthquakes.

Liga FUTVE

- Academia Puerto Cabello (Note: The eight Liga FUTVE teams that qualified for the final stages of the 2026 Apertura tournament received a bye to the round of 16.)
- Anzoátegui
- Carabobo
- Caracas
- Deportivo La Guaira
- Deportivo Táchira
- Estudiantes de Mérida
- Metropolitanos
- Monagas
- Portuguesa
- Rayo Zuliano
- Trujillanos
- Universidad Central
- Zamora

Liga FUTVE 2

- Aragua
- Atlético Barinas
- Atlético El Vigía
- Ávila
- Barquisimeto
- Bolívar
- Deportivo Lara
- Deportivo Miranda
- Dynamo Puerto
- ~~Marítimo de La Guaira~~
- Mineros de Guayana
- Real Frontera
- Ureña
- Yaracuyanos

== Group stage ==
The group stage began on 24 June and ended on 14 October 2026.

=== Group A ===
Pos	Team	Pld	W	D	L	GF	GA	GD	Pts	Qualification	ANZ	AVI	DMI	MAR
1	Anzoátegui	4	3	1	0	9	5	+4	10	Advance to the knockout stage	—	3–1	2–1	—
2	Ávila	4	1	1	2	3	5	−2	4		1–2	—	1–0	—
3	Deportivo Miranda	4	0	2	2	3	5	−2	2		2–2	0–0	—	—
4	Marítimo de La Guaira	0	0	0	0	0	0	0	0	Withdrew (Note: Marítimo de La Guaira withdrew from the competition due to the impact of the 2026 Venezuela earthquakes.)	—	—	—	—

Source: Soccerway
Legend: Blue = home team win; Yellow = draw; Red = away team win.
Rules for classification: 1) Points; 2) Goal difference; 3) Goals scored; 4) Head-to-head results; 5) Drawing of lots.

=== Group B ===
Pos	Team	Pld	W	D	L	GF	GA	GD	Pts	Qualification	ZAM	ATB	VIG	REF
1	Zamora	6	4	1	1	17	5	+12	13	Advance to the knockout stage	—	0–0	6–1	5–0
2	Atlético Barinas	6	4	1	1	12	5	+7	13	Advance to the knockout stage	3–1	—	5–2	3–0
3	Atlético El Vigía	6	2	1	3	11	16	−5	7		1–3	2–0	—	4–1
4	Real Frontera	6	0	1	5	2	16	−14	1		0–2	0–1	1–1	—

Source: Soccerway
Legend: Blue = home team win; Yellow = draw; Red = away team win.
Rules for classification: 1) Points; 2) Goal difference; 3) Goals scored; 4) Head-to-head results; 5) Drawing of lots.

=== Group C ===
Pos	Team	Pld	W	D	L	GF	GA	GD	Pts	Qualification	CAR	ARA	YAR	BAR
1	Caracas	6	4	1	1	14	7	+7	13	Advance to the knockout stage	—	1–1	1–0	3–1
2	Aragua	6	3	1	2	14	8	+6	10	Advance to the knockout stage	3–1	—	1–2	0–1
3	Yaracuyanos	6	2	1	3	11	11	0	7		2–3	2–5	—	1–1
4	Barquisimeto	6	1	1	4	4	17	−13	4		0–5	1–4	0–4	—

Source: Soccerway
Legend: Blue = home team win; Yellow = draw; Red = away team win.
Rules for classification: 1) Points; 2) Goal difference; 3) Goals scored; 4) Head-to-head results; 5) Drawing of lots.

=== Group D ===
Pos	Team	Pld	W	D	L	GF	GA	GD	Pts	Qualification	RAY	LAR	URE	TRU
1	Rayo Zuliano	6	3	3	0	9	3	+6	12	Advance to the knockout stage	—	3–2	3–0	0–0
2	Deportivo Lara	6	2	1	3	9	9	0	7		1–3	—	4–1	2–1
3	Ureña	6	1	3	2	6	11	−5	6		0–0	1–0	—	2–2
4	Trujillanos	6	0	5	1	5	6	−1	5		0–0	0–0	2–2	—

Source: Soccerway
Legend: Blue = home team win; Yellow = draw; Red = away team win.
Rules for classification: 1) Points; 2) Goal difference; 3) Goals scored; 4) Head-to-head results; 5) Drawing of lots.

=== Group E ===
Pos	Team	Pld	W	D	L	GF	GA	GD	Pts	Qualification	MON	MIN	BOL	DYP
1	Monagas	6	5	0	1	15	4	+11	15	Advance to the knockout stage	—	1–0	5–1	2–1
2	Mineros de Guayana	6	3	1	2	13	3	+10	10	Advance to the knockout stage	1–0	—	1–1	6–0
3	Bolívar	6	2	1	3	7	11	−4	7		1–3	1–0	—	1–2
4	Dynamo Puerto	6	1	0	5	3	20	−17	3		0–4	0–5	0–2	—

Source: Soccerway
Legend: Blue = home team win; Yellow = draw; Red = away team win.
Rules for classification: 1) Points; 2) Goal difference; 3) Goals scored; 4) Head-to-head results; 5) Drawing of lots.

=== Ranking of group runners-up ===
The three best teams among those ranked second in their groups advanced to the knockout stage.

Pos	Grp	Team	Pld	W	D	L	GF	GA	GD	Pts	Qualification
1	B	Atlético Barinas	6	4	1	1	12	5	+7	13	Advance to the knockout stage
2	E	Mineros de Guayana	6	3	1	2	13	3	+10	10	Advance to the knockout stage
3	C	Aragua	6	3	1	2	14	8	+6	10	Advance to the knockout stage
4	D	Deportivo Lara	6	2	1	3	9	9	0	7	
5	A	Ávila	4	1	1	2	3	5	−2	4	

Source: Soccerway
Rules for classification: 1) Points; 2) Goal difference; 3) Goals scored; 4) Drawing of lots.

== Knockout stage ==
=== Bracket ===
Round of 16
Universidad Central	5
Atlético Barinas	3
Estudiantes de Mérida	1 (2)
Caracas (p)	1 (4)
Deportivo La Guaira	3
Aragua	0
Metropolitanos	1 (3)
Anzoátegui (p)	1 (4)
Carabobo (p)	1 (4)
Mineros de Guayana	1 (1)
Portuguesa	0
Zamora	2
Deportivo Táchira (p)	1 (4)
Monagas	1 (2)
Academia Puerto Cabello	3
Rayo Zuliano	1

Quarter-finals
Universidad Central	4
Caracas	1
Deportivo La Guaira	0
Anzoátegui	1
Carabobo (p)	0 (9)
Zamora	0 (8)
Deportivo Táchira (awd.)	3
Academia Puerto Cabello	0

Semi-finals
Universidad Central
Anzoátegui
Carabobo
Deportivo Táchira

Final

=== Round of 16 ===
The round of 16 matches were played on 21 and 22 October 2026.

21 October 2026	Estudiantes de Mérida	1–1 (2–4 p)	Caracas	Mérida
17:00 UTC−4	Chacón 18'	Report	Larotonda 86'	Stadium: Metropolitano; Referee: Yorman Madrid
	Penalties
	Ramírez (penalty scored); Maldonado (penalty missed); Mejías (penalty missed); Matheus (penalty scored)		(penalty scored) Vegas; (penalty scored) Larotonda; (penalty scored) De Santis; (penalty scored) Márquez

21 October 2026	Deportivo La Guaira	3–0	Aragua	Caracas
18:00 UTC−4	Pomozy 18'; Rivas 62'; Uribe 64'	Report		Stadium: Olímpico de la UCV

21 October 2026	Deportivo Táchira	1–1 (4–2 p)	Monagas	San Cristóbal
18:00 UTC−4	Lozano 73'	Report	Fayuta 90+2'	Stadium: Polideportivo de Pueblo Nuevo; Referee: Miguel Rosales
	Penalties
	Lozano (penalty scored); Adamo (penalty scored); Sosa (penalty scored); Fratta (penalty scored)		(penalty scored) Asibe; (penalty missed) Jaramillo; (penalty scored) Romero; (penalty missed) Natera

21 October 2026	Portuguesa	0–2	Zamora	Acarigua
19:00 UTC−4		Report	Valladares 16'; Sinisterra 28'	Stadium: General José Antonio Páez; Referee: Alejandro Velásquez

21 October 2026	Academia Puerto Cabello	3–1	Rayo Zuliano	Puerto Cabello
19:30 UTC−4	Pernía 20', 30'; Cassu 50'	Report	González 64'	Stadium: La Bombonerita

21 October 2026	Carabobo	1–1 (4–1 p)	Mineros de Guayana	Valencia
19:30 UTC−4	Martínez 55'	Report	Peñaranda 90'	Stadium: Misael Delgado; Referee: Jesús Chandía
	Penalties
	Mendoza (penalty scored); Martínez (penalty scored); Meza (penalty scored); Bilbao (penalty scored)		(penalty missed) Zamora; (penalty scored) Diosm. Pacheco; (penalty missed) El Khuffash

22 October 2026	Metropolitanos	1–1 (3–4 p)	Anzoátegui	Caracas
15:00 UTC−4	Díaz 90+1'	Report	Marín 33'	Stadium: Olímpico de la UCV
	Penalties
	Garcés (penalty scored); Riasco (penalty scored); Sangiovani (penalty missed); Bianciotti (penalty missed); Caricote (penalty scored)		(penalty scored) Navas; (penalty scored) Ruiz; (penalty scored) Lujano; (penalty missed) Moreno; (penalty scored) Cermeño

22 October 2026	Universidad Central	5–3	Atlético Barinas	Caracas
19:30 UTC−4	Alegría 11'; Silva 71'; Colmenarez 81'; Sosa 85'; Carrillo 88'	Report	Osorio 26'; Valencia 55', 90+1'	Stadium: Olímpico de la UCV; Referee: Eli Hernández

=== Quarter-finals ===
18 November 2026	Carabobo	0–0 (9–8 p)	Zamora	Valencia
16:30 UTC−4		Report		Stadium: Misael Delgado
	Penalties
	Ramírez (penalty scored); López (penalty scored); Meza (penalty scored); Neira (penalty scored); Bilbao (penalty missed); Díaz (penalty scored); Oliveros (penalty scored); Fuentes (penalty scored); Angulo (penalty scored); Martínez (penalty missed); Roa (penalty scored)		(penalty scored) Sinisterra; (penalty scored) Valladares; (penalty scored) Mosquera; (penalty scored) Sulbarán; (penalty scored) Palacios; (penalty scored) Patiño; (penalty scored) Ramírez; (penalty scored) Noguera; (penalty missed) Moreno

18 November 2026	Deportivo Táchira	3–0; Awarded	Academia Puerto Cabello	San Cristóbal
18:00 UTC−4		Report		Stadium: Polideportivo de Pueblo Nuevo
	Penalties
	Pollero (penalty missed); Adamo (penalty scored); Calzadilla (penalty scored); La Cruz (penalty scored); Provenzano (penalty scored); Sosa (penalty missed)		(penalty scored) Contreras; (penalty scored) Saggiomo; (penalty missed) Rosales; (penalty scored) Castillo; (penalty scored) González; (penalty scored) Osorio
Note: The match, which ended 0–0 and with Academia Puerto Cabello winning 5–4 on penalties, was awarded to Deportivo Táchira due to Academia Puerto Cabello breaching competition rules regarding the number of youth players on field.

18 November 2026	Universidad Central	4–1	Caracas	Caracas
19:00 UTC−4	Sosa 18'; Barrios 41' (o.g.); De Souza 69'; Altamar 79'	Report	Quintero 90+2'	Stadium: Olímpico de la UCV; Referee: Ángel Arteaga

19 November 2026	Deportivo La Guaira	0–1	Anzoátegui	Caracas
18:30 UTC−4		Report	Franco 76'	Stadium: Olímpico de la UCV; Referee: Carlos Parra

=== Semi-finals ===
25 November 2026	Universidad Central	v	Anzoátegui	Caracas
--:-- UTC−4				Stadium: Olímpico de la UCV

25 November 2026	Carabobo	v	Deportivo Táchira	Valencia
--:-- UTC−4				Stadium: Misael Delgado

== See also ==
- 2026 Liga FUTVE
