= 2019 Copa Venezuela =

Tournament details
- Country: Venezuela
- Dates: 27 July – 27 November 2019
- Teams: 39

Final positions
- Champions: Zamora (1st title)
- Runners-up: Monagas
- Copa Sudamericana: Zamora

Tournament statistics
- Matches played: 78
- Goals scored: 186 (2.38 per match)

The 2019 Copa Venezuela was the 50th edition of the competition. It began on 27 July 2019 with the first stage and concluded on 27 November 2019 with the second leg of the finals. The champions will qualify for the 2020 Copa Sudamericana. Primera División side Zulia were the defending champions, but they were eliminated by Academia Puerto Cabello in the quarter-finals.

Zamora won their first title in the competition after defeating Monagas on away goals in the final, and qualified for the 2020 Copa Sudamericana.

== First stage ==
- Teams entering the competition at this round: 16 teams from the Segunda División.
- The first legs were played on 27 and 28 July and the second legs were played on 3 August 2019.

Team 1	Agg.	Team 2	1st leg	2nd leg
Fundación AIFI	6–1	Chicó de Guayana	4–1	2–0
Petroleros	3–1	Ciudad Vinotinto	0–0	3–1
Dynamo Puerto	0–0 (3–1 p)	Universidad Central	0–0	0–0
Libertador	2–2 (9–10 p)	Deportivo Petare	1–1	1–1
Yaracuyanos	2–2 (3–4 p)	Atlético Furrial	1–1	1–1
Hermanos Colmenarez	4–1	ULA	2–0	2–1
El Vigía	6–2	Deportivo JBL	4–0	2–2
Ureña	2–4	Real Frontera	0–1	2–3

=== First leg ===
27 July 2019	Fundación AIFI	4–1	Chicó de Guayana	Ciudad Guayana
15:30	Godad 13'; Carvajal 31', 70'; Caraballo 73'	Report	Basante 87'	Stadium: Polideportivo Cachamay; Attendance: 380; Referee: Darwin Cabeza

27 July 2019	Yaracuyanos	1–1	Atlético Furrial	San Felipe
15:30	Carrasquel 90+5'	Report	Hernández 9'	Stadium: Florentino Oropeza; Referee: Joan Leal

27 July 2019	Hermanos Colmenarez	2–0	ULA	Barinas
15:30	Noriega 28'; Cabrera 64'	Report		Stadium: Reinaldo Melo; Attendance: 350; Referee: Isabel Rodríguez

27 July 2019	El Vigía	4–0	Deportivo JBL	El Vigía
15:30	Blandón 24', 39', 60'; Mejía 80'	Report		Stadium: Ramón Hernández; Attendance: 250; Referee: María Herrán

27 July 2019	Ureña	0–1	Real Frontera	San Cristóbal
15:30		Report	Altuve 60'	Stadium: Polideportivo de Pueblo Nuevo; Attendance: 100; Referee: Jesús Montiel

28 July 2019	Dynamo Puerto	0–0	Universidad Central	Puerto La Cruz
15:00		Report		Stadium: Francisco Massiani; Attendance: 632; Referee: Alejandro Velásquez

28 July 2019	Petroleros	0–0	Ciudad Vinotinto	Puerto La Cruz
15:30		Report		Stadium: José Antonio Anzoátegui; Attendance: 585; Referee: Pedro Sagaray

28 July 2019	Libertador	1–1	Deportivo Petare	Caracas
15:30	Alemán 38'	Report	Rivas 67' (pen.)	Stadium: Universidad Santa María campus Attendance: 357; Referee: Stalin Rondón

=== Second leg ===
3 August 2019	Chicó de Guayana	0–2 (1–6 agg.)	Fundación AIFI	Ciudad Guayana
15:30		Report	Golindano 28'; Ramos 82'	Stadium: Polideportivo Cachamay; Attendance: 354; Referee: Félix Guilarte

3 August 2019	Ciudad Vinotinto	1–3 (1–3 agg.)	Petroleros	Puerto La Cruz
15:30	Simigliani 23' (pen.)	Report	Rodríguez 60'; Camacho 64'; Romero 69'	Stadium: José Antonio Anzoátegui; Attendance: 482; Referee: Maykol Gómez

3 August 2019	Universidad Central	0–0 (0–0 agg.) (1–3 p)	Dynamo Puerto	Caracas
15:30		Report		Stadium: Olímpico de la UCV; Attendance: 158; Referee: Oscar Durán

3 August 2019	Deportivo Petare	1–1 (2–2 agg.) (10–9 p)	Libertador	Caracas
15:30	Ramos 62'	Report	Perdomo 85'	Stadium: Cocodrilos Sports Park; Attendance: 362; Referee: Joan Leal

3 August 2019	Atlético Furrial	1–1 (2–2 agg.) (4–3 p)	Yaracuyanos	Guanare
15:30	Pérez 74'	Report	Casseres 83'	Stadium: Rafael Calles Pinto; Attendance: 160; Referee: Yeferzon Miranda

3 August 2019	ULA	1–2 (1–4 agg.)	Hermanos Colmenarez	Mérida
15:30	Urdaneta 70'	Report	Rivas 73'; Castillo 79'	Stadium: Metropolitano; Attendance: 83; Referee: José Uzcátegui

3 August 2019	Deportivo JBL	2–2 (2–6 agg.)	El Vigía	Maracaibo
15:30	Landaeta 11'; Puche 17'	Report	Parra 22'; Blandón 88'	Stadium: José Pachencho Romero; Attendance: 215; Referee: Darwin Colina

3 August 2019	Real Frontera	3–2 (4–2 agg.)	Ureña	San Cristóbal
15:30	Silva 60'; Contreras 77'; Bautista (?)	Report	Patearrollo 27'; Perea 29'	Stadium: Complejo Deportivo UCAT; Attendance: 50; Referee: Francis Sosa

== Second stage ==
- Teams entering the competition at this round: 19 teams from the Primera División, 4 teams from the Segunda División.
- The draw for the second stage and subsequent stages was held on 13 August 2019 at the FVF headquarters in Caracas.
- The first legs were played on 3–4 and 12 September and the second legs were played on 17 and 18 September 2019.

Team 1	Agg.	Team 2	1st leg	2nd leg
Centro-Occidental Group
Zulia	Bye	N/A	N/A	N/A
Trujillanos	4–0	Portuguesa	1–0	3–0
Llaneros	1–2	Deportivo Lara	1–1	0–1
TFC Maracaibo	3–5	Academia Puerto Cabello	2–3	1–2
El Vigía	2–6	Estudiantes de Mérida	1–2	2–4
Real Frontera	2–6	Deportivo Táchira	1–5	1–1
Atlético Furrial	1–7	Carabobo	0–4	1–3
Hermanos Colmenarez	1–2	Zamora	0–1	1–1
Centro-Oriental Group
Fundación AIFI	1–2	Mineros	1–0	0–2
Angostura	4–2	LALA	2–0	2–2
GV Maracay	1–9	Deportivo La Guaira	0–3	1–6
Dynamo Puerto	2–7	Monagas	1–1	1–6
Petroleros	3–5	Metropolitanos	2–2	1–3
Caracas	3–1	Deportivo Petare	0–1	3–0
Estudiantes de Caracas	1–1 (a)	Atlético Venezuela	0–0	1–1
Yaracuy	2–1	Aragua	1–1	1–0

=== First leg ===
3 September 2019	Atlético Furrial	0–4	Carabobo	Turén
15:30		Report	Herrera 34'; Otero 43'; Chacón 67'; Ramos 79' (pen.)	Stadium: Víctor Julio Ramos; Attendance: 1,396; Referee: María Herrán

4 September 2019	Fundación AIFI	1–0	Mineros	Ciudad Guayana
15:00	Aular 82'	Report		Stadium: Polideportivo Cachamay; Attendance: 490; Referee: Alejandro Velásquez

4 September 2019	Dynamo Puerto	1–1	Monagas	Puerto La Cruz
15:00	Yendis 60' (o.g.)	Report	González 40'	Stadium: Francisco Massiani; Attendance: 450; Referee: Maykol Gómez

4 September 2019	El Vigía	1–2	Estudiantes de Mérida	El Vigía
15:30	Mejía 42'	Report	Flores 34'; Castillo 74'	Stadium: Ramón Hernández; Attendance: 890; Referee: Reyes Soto

4 September 2019	GV Maracay	0–3	Deportivo La Guaira	Maracay
15:30		Report	Marín 11'; Balza 39' (pen.); Ortiz 77'	Stadium: Giuseppe Antonelli; Attendance: 429; Referee: Adrián Cabello

4 September 2019	Petroleros	2–2	Metropolitanos	Puerto La Cruz
15:30	Rivero 29' (pen.); Villae 55'	Report	Antón 7'; Pabón 90+2' (pen.)	Stadium: José Antonio Anzoátegui; Attendance: 450; Referee: Yender Herrera

4 September 2019	Yaracuy	1–1	Aragua	San Felipe
15:30	Palencia 90+3'	Report	Navas 58'	Stadium: Florentino Oropeza; Attendance: 608; Referee: José Argote

4 September 2019	Trujillanos	1–0	Portuguesa	Valera
16:00	Bravo 75'	Report		Stadium: José Alberto Pérez; Attendance: 2,865; Referee: Rony Cueva

4 September 2019	Llaneros	1–1	Deportivo Lara	Guanare
16:00	Agnello 43' (pen.)	Report	Di Renzo 15'	Stadium: Rafael Calles Pinto; Attendance: 300; Referee: Anderson Tovar

4 September 2019	Hermanos Colmenarez	0–1	Zamora	Barinas
16:00		Report	Márquez 37'	Stadium: Agustín Tovar; Attendance: 1,500; Referee: Isley Delgado

4 September 2019	Angostura	2–0	LALA	Ciudad Bolívar
16:00	Cermeño 16'; Salazar 64'	Report		Stadium: Ricardo Tulio Maya; Attendance: 800; Referee: José Rondón

4 September 2019	Estudiantes de Caracas	0–0	Atlético Venezuela	Maracay
16:00		Report		Stadium: Olímpico Hermanos Ghersi Páez; Attendance: 113; Referee: Orlando Bracamonte

4 September 2019	Real Frontera	1–5	Deportivo Táchira	San Cristóbal
17:00	Tapia 80'	Report	Montero 27', 51', 76'; Gómez 45+1'; Velasco 64'	Stadium: Polideportivo de Pueblo Nuevo; Attendance: 2,078; Referee: Andrés Pernía

4 September 2019	Caracas	0–1	Deportivo Petare	Caracas
17:00		Report	Guevara 79'	Stadium: Olímpico de la UCV; Attendance: 1,462; Referee: Emikar Calderas

12 September 2019	TFC Maracaibo	2–3	Academia Puerto Cabello	Maracaibo
16:00	Alarcón 35'; Abreu 65'	Report	Moreno 45+2'; Hernández 54'; Pinto 90+4'	Stadium: José Pachencho Romero; Attendance: 515; Referee: José Luis Hoyo

=== Second leg ===
17 September 2019	Metropolitanos	3–1 (5–3 agg.)	Petroleros	Caracas
16:00	Mancín 44'; Ibarra 51'; Silva 67'	Report	Romero 90+2'	Stadium: Olímpico de la UCV; Attendance: 451; Referee: María Herrán

18 September 2019	Deportivo Petare	0–3 (1–3 agg.)	Caracas	Caracas
15:30		Report	Febres 3'; Celis 23'; De Santis 90+1'	Stadium: Cocodrilos Sports Park; Attendance: 414; Referee: Carlos Romero

18 September 2019	Portuguesa	0–3 (0–4 agg.)	Trujillanos	Acarigua
16:00		Report	Montilla 35'; Carmona 47'; Castillo 73'	Stadium: General José Antonio Páez; Attendance: 127; Referee: Yimmy García

18 September 2019	Deportivo Lara	1–0 (2–1 agg.)	Llaneros	Cabudare
16:00	Caraballo 33'	Report		Stadium: Metropolitano; Attendance: 683; Referee: Juan Cabeza

18 September 2019	Estudiantes de Mérida	4–2 (6–3 agg.)	El Vigía	Mérida
16:00	Rivas 2', 33'; Castillo 41'; Linarez 58'	Report	Zarur 39', 78'	Stadium: Metropolitano; Attendance: 3,213; Referee: Marlon Escalante

18 September 2019	Carabobo	3–1 (7–1 agg.)	Atlético Furrial	Guanare
16:00	Tortolero 13'; Herrera 34'; Mendoza 76'	Report	Urbina 58' (pen.)	Stadium: Rafael Calles Pinto; Attendance: 87; Referee: Yender Herrera

18 September 2019	LALA	2–2 (2–4 agg.)	Angostura	Ciudad Guayana
16:00	Guerra 6'; Ramírez 85'	Report	Salazar 22' (pen.); Castellín 55'	Stadium: Polideportivo Cachamay; Attendance: 786; Referee: Alejandro Velásquez

18 September 2019	Deportivo La Guaira	6–1 (9–1 agg.)	GV Maracay	Caracas
16:00	Paz 32'; Marín 35'; Ortiz 57'; Aquino 75', 90'; Bolívar 84'	Report	Ibarra 87'	Stadium: Olímpico de la UCV; Referee: Isley Delgado

18 September 2019	Atlético Venezuela	1–1 (1–1 agg.)	Estudiantes de Caracas (a)	Maracay
16:00	Arenas 44'	Report	Pérez 90+2'	Stadium: Giuseppe Antonelli; Attendance: 138; Referee: Edwing Gómez

18 September 2019	Zamora	1–1 (2–1 agg.)	Hermanos Colmenarez	Barinas
17:00	Nieto 29' (o.g.)	Report	Pérez 85'	Stadium: Agustín Tovar; Attendance: 1,886; Referee: Francisco López

18 September 2019	Monagas	6–1 (7–2 agg.)	Dynamo Puerto	Maturín
17:00	Hernández 3', 68', 75'; Castillo 16'; Rivera 48', 56'	Report	Vásquez 65' (pen.)	Stadium: Monumental; Attendance: 2,835; Referee: Oscar Durán

18 September 2019	Aragua	0–1 (1–2 agg.)	Yaracuy	Maracay
17:00		Report	Arciniegas 78'	Stadium: Olímpico Hermanos Ghersi Páez; Attendance: 1,327; Referee: Yordwin Silva

18 September 2019	Academia Puerto Cabello	2–1 (5–3 agg.)	TFC Maracaibo	Puerto Cabello
18:00	Moreno 21'; Silvestre 45+1'	Report	Silvestre 11' (o.g.)	Stadium: Complejo Deportivo Socialista; Attendance: 4,550; Referee: Andrés Pernía

18 September 2019	Deportivo Táchira	1–1 (6–2 agg.)	Real Frontera	San Cristóbal
19:00	Pérez Greco 45' (pen.)	Report	Cabarico 62'	Stadium: Polideportivo de Pueblo Nuevo; Attendance: 1,788; Referee: Isabel Rodríguez

18 September 2019	Mineros	2–0 (2–1 agg.)	Fundación AIFI	Ciudad Guayana
19:30	Annese 6'; Marrufo 81'	Report		Stadium: Polideportivo Cachamay; Attendance: 587; Referee: Darwin Cabeza

== Final stages ==
=== Round of 16 ===
- The first legs were played on 9 October and the second legs were played on 16 and 17 October 2019.

Team 1	Agg.	Team 2	1st leg	2nd leg
Centro-Occidental Group
Deportivo Lara	0–0 (2–4 p)	Zulia	0–0	0–0
Trujillanos	3–4	Academia Puerto Cabello	1–2	2–2
Estudiantes de Mérida	0–0 (1–4 p)	Carabobo	0–0	0–0
Deportivo Táchira	2–3	Zamora	0–2	2–1
Centro-Oriental Group
Deportivo La Guaira	3–0	Mineros	0–0	3–0
Angostura	3–3 (2–4 p)	Monagas	1–2	2–1
Estudiantes de Caracas	1–2	Metropolitanos	0–2	1–0
Yaracuy	1–2	Caracas	0–1	1–1

==== First leg ====
9 October 2019	Deportivo La Guaira	0–0	Mineros	Caracas
15:30		Report		Stadium: Universidad Santa María campus Attendance: 1,284; Referee: Yimmy García

9 October 2019	Yaracuy	0–1	Caracas	San Felipe
15:30		Report	Moreno 72'	Stadium: Florentino Oropeza; Attendance: 600; Referee: Andrés Pernía

9 October 2019	Deportivo Lara	0–0	Zulia	Cabudare
16:00		Report		Stadium: Metropolitano; Attendance: 763; Referee: Ramón Ortega

9 October 2019	Trujillanos	1–2	Academia Puerto Cabello	Valera
16:00	Arenas 90+1' (pen.)	Report	Maldonado 19'; Padilla 86'	Stadium: José Alberto Pérez; Attendance: 1,500; Referee: Rafael Guarín

9 October 2019	Estudiantes de Mérida	0–0	Carabobo	Mérida
16:00		Report		Stadium: Guillermo Soto Rosa; Attendance: 5,346; Referee: Juan Cabeza

9 October 2019	Angostura	1–2	Monagas	Ciudad Bolívar
16:00	Cermeño 76'	Report	Soda 64' (pen.); Hernández 68'	Stadium: Ricardo Tulio Maya; Attendance: 800; Referee: Maykol Gómez

9 October 2019	Estudiantes de Caracas	0–2	Metropolitanos	Maracay
16:00		Report	Bahachille 52'; Acevedo 71'	Stadium: Olímpico Hermanos Ghersi Páez; Attendance: 93; Referee: Yender Herrera

9 October 2019	Deportivo Táchira	0–2	Zamora	San Cristóbal
18:00		Report	Matheus 44'; Castro 87'	Stadium: Polideportivo de Pueblo Nuevo; Attendance: 2,186; Referee: Jesús Valenzuela

==== Second leg ====
16 October 2019	Zulia	0–0 (0–0 agg.) (4–2 p)	Deportivo Lara	Maracaibo
16:00		Report		Stadium: José Pachencho Romero; Attendance: 1,186; Referee: Jesús Valenzuela

16 October 2019	Carabobo	0–0 (0–0 agg.) (4–1 p)	Estudiantes de Mérida	Guanare
16:00		Report		Stadium: Rafael Calles Pinto; Attendance: 174; Referee: Ángel Arteaga

16 October 2019	Metropolitanos	0–1 (2–1 agg.)	Estudiantes de Caracas	Caracas
16:00		Report	López 40'	Stadium: Olímpico de la UCV; Attendance: 491; Referee: Francisco López

16 October 2019	Mineros	0–3 (0–3 agg.)	Deportivo La Guaira	Ciudad Guayana
17:00		Report	Silva 7'; Ortiz 17'; Peña 23'	Stadium: Polideportivo Cachamay; Attendance: 386; Referee: Ramón Ortega

16 October 2019	Monagas	1–2 (3–3 agg.) (4–2 p)	Angostura	Maturín
17:00	Reyes 29'	Report	Gómez 28'; Cermeño 31'	Stadium: Monumental; Attendance: 2,155; Referee: Ronny Cueva

16 October 2019	Academia Puerto Cabello	2–2 (4–3 agg.)	Trujillanos	Puerto Cabello
18:00	Tineo 13'; Chacón 87'	Report	Arenas 34' (pen.), 89'	Stadium: Complejo Deportivo Socialista; Attendance: 4,729; Referee: Juan Cabeza

16 October 2019	Zamora	1–2 (3–2 agg.)	Deportivo Táchira	Barinas
18:00	Arteaga 90+11'	Report	Ramírez 38'; Trejo 90'	Stadium: Agustín Tovar; Attendance: 2,526; Referee: Orlando Bracamonte

17 October 2019	Caracas	1–1 (2–1 agg.)	Yaracuy	Caracas
17:00	Silva 90+2'	Report	Palencia 90+3'	Stadium: Olímpico de la UCV; Attendance: 1,090; Referee: Yender Herrera

=== Quarter-finals ===
- The first legs were played on 23 October and the second legs were played on 30 October 2019.

Team 1	Agg.	Team 2	1st leg	2nd leg
Centro-Occidental Group
Academia Puerto Cabello	3–0	Zulia	2–0	1–0
Zamora	4–1	Carabobo	2–1	2–0
Centro-Oriental Group
Monagas	2–2 (a)	Deportivo La Guaira	1–0	1–2
Metropolitanos	1–1 (a)	Caracas	0–0	1–1

==== First leg ====
23 October 2019	Metropolitanos	0–0	Caracas	Caracas
16:00		Report		Stadium: Olímpico de la UCV; Attendance: 573; Referee: José Argote

23 October 2019	Monagas	1–0	Deportivo La Guaira	Maturín
17:00	Reyes 48'	Report		Stadium: Monumental; Attendance: 2,175; Referee: Alexis Herrera

23 October 2019	Academia Puerto Cabello	2–0	Zulia	Puerto Cabello
18:00	Chacón 21', 64'	Report		Stadium: Complejo Deportivo Socialista; Attendance: 4,997; Referee: Orlando Bracamonte

23 October 2019	Zamora	2–1	Carabobo	Barinas
19:00	Matheus 55'; Rodríguez 83'	Report	Herrera 33'	Stadium: Agustín Tovar; Attendance: 2,149; Referee: Yimmy García

==== Second leg ====
30 October 2019	Deportivo La Guaira	2–1 (2–2 agg.)	Monagas (a)	Caracas
11:00	Peña 64'; Aquino 90+1' (pen.)	Report	Reyes 38'	Stadium: Olímpico de la UCV; Attendance: 1,137; Referee: José Argote

30 October 2019	Zulia	0–1 (0–3 agg.)	Academia Puerto Cabello	Maracaibo
16:00		Report	Lacava 90+5'	Stadium: José Pachencho Romero; Attendance: 1,029; Referee: Ángel Arteaga

30 October 2019	Carabobo	0–2 (1–4 agg.)	Zamora	Guanare
16:00		Report	Hernández 35'; Rojas 90+1'	Stadium: Rafael Calles Pinto; Attendance: 175; Referee: Jesús Valenzuela

30 October 2019	Caracas	1–1 (1–1 agg.)	Metropolitanos (a)	Caracas
17:00	Arrieta 31'	Report	Falcón 90+5'	Stadium: Olímpico de la UCV; Attendance: 1,387; Referee: Orlando Bracamonte

=== Semi-finals ===
- The first legs were played on 6 November and the second legs were played on 13 November 2019.

Team 1	Agg.	Team 2	1st leg	2nd leg
Academia Puerto Cabello	2–3	Zamora	1–1	1–2
Monagas	3–2	Metropolitanos	1–2	2–0

==== First leg ====
6 November 2019	Monagas	1–2	Metropolitanos	Maturín
17:00	Reyes 36'	Report	Mancín 60', 68'	Stadium: Monumental; Attendance: 5,535; Referee: Jesús Valenzuela

6 November 2019	Academia Puerto Cabello	1–1	Zamora	Puerto Cabello
18:00	Garcés 90+5'	Report	Maza 64'	Stadium: Complejo Deportivo Socialista; Attendance: 4,989; Referee: José Argote

==== Second leg ====
13 November 2019	Metropolitanos	0–2 (2–3 agg.)	Monagas	Caracas
16:00		Report	Rojas 40', 79'	Stadium: Olímpico de la UCV; Attendance: 891; Referee: Alexis Herrera

13 November 2019	Zamora	2–1 (3–2 agg.)	Academia Puerto Cabello	Barinas
19:00	Arteaga 29' (pen.), 53'	Report	Garcés 56' (pen.)	Stadium: Agustín Tovar; Attendance: 4,151; Referee: Ángel Arteaga

=== Finals ===
The finals were played on 20 and 27 November 2019.

20 November 2019
19:00

Monagas	3–2	Zamora
Rivera 16'; Reyes 29'; Castillo 53'	Report	Arteaga 47', 51'

Estadio Monumental, Maturín
Attendance: 11,850
Referee: Yercinia Correa

27 November 2019
19:00

Zamora	1–0	Monagas
Ramírez 87'	Report

Estadio Agustín Tovar, Barinas
Attendance: 21,105
Referee: Jesús Valenzuela

Tied 3–3 on aggregate, Zamora won on away goals.
