= 2025 Copa Venezuela =

Tournament details
- Country: Venezuela
- Dates: 4 June – 8 October 2025
- Teams: 28

Final positions
- Champions: Universidad Central (1st title)
- Runners-up: Carabobo

Tournament statistics
- Matches played: 90
- Goals scored: 237 (2.63 per match)

The 2025 Copa Venezuela was the 52nd edition of the Venezuelan football cup, which is organized by the Venezuelan Football Federation (FVF). The competition began on 4 June 2025, with the participation of 14 Primera División and 14 Segunda División teams, and ended on 8 October 2025.

Universidad Central were the champions, winning their first title in the competition after defeating Carabobo 4–3 on kicks from the penalty mark in the finals. As winners, Universidad Central qualified for the 2026 Supercopa de Venezuela against the 2025 Primera División champions.

Deportivo La Guaira were the defending champions, having won the tournament in 2024, but were eliminated by Universidad Central in the semi-finals.

== Format changes ==
Although for this year, the competition retained its group and knockout stages, the number of participating sides was reduced from 30 to 28 as the reserve sides of Academia Puerto Cabello and Monagas were not allowed to enter the competition despite competing in Segunda División, and the group stage was contested by 20 teams: the remaining 14 second tier sides and the six Primera División teams that failed to advance to the final stages of the 2025 Apertura tournament, whilst the eight Primera División teams that advanced to the semi-finals of the 2025 Apertura tournament (Deportivo La Guaira, Carabobo, Universidad Central, Deportivo Táchira, Academia Puerto Cabello, Portuguesa, Metropolitanos, and Anzoátegui) received a bye to the round of 16. In the group stage, the 20 participating teams were divided into five groups of four teams each, in which teams played each one of their group rivals twice (once at home and once away), with the five group winners and the three best group runners-up advancing to the knockout stage to join the eight teams that entered the competition at that point. Unlike the previous edition, in which matches in the knockout rounds (round of 16, quarter-finals, semi-finals, and final) were played over a single leg, the different knockout rounds were played over two legs in this season.

== Group stage ==
The group stage began on 4 June and ended on 10 July 2025.

=== Group A ===
Pos	Team	Pld	W	D	L	GF	GA	GD	Pts	Qualification	CAR	DYP	DMI	ARA
1	Caracas	6	3	2	1	10	4	+6	11	Advance to the knockout stage	—	2–0	0–0	4–0
2	Dynamo Puerto	6	3	1	2	11	9	+2	10	Advance to the knockout stage	2–2	—	2–0	4–1
3	Deportivo Miranda	6	2	2	2	7	4	+3	8		0–1	3–0	—	3–0
4	Aragua	6	1	1	4	5	16	−11	4		2–1	1–3	1–1	—

Source: Flashscore
Rules for classification: 1) Points; 2) Goal difference; 3) Goals scored; 4) Head-to-head results; 5) Drawing of lots.

=== Group B ===
Pos	Team	Pld	W	D	L	GF	GA	GD	Pts	Qualification	ESM	REF	VIG	URE
1	Estudiantes de Mérida	6	5	1	0	16	1	+15	16	Advance to the knockout stage	—	3–0	4–0	5–0
2	Real Frontera	6	3	1	2	7	6	+1	10	Advance to the knockout stage	0–0	—	0–1	3–1
3	El Vigía	6	3	0	3	8	11	−3	9		1–3	1–2	—	3–1
4	Ureña	6	0	0	6	3	16	−13	0		0–1	0–2	1–2	—

Source: Flashscore
Rules for classification: 1) Points; 2) Goal difference; 3) Goals scored; 4) Head-to-head results; 5) Drawing of lots.

=== Group C ===
Pos	Team	Pld	W	D	L	GF	GA	GD	Pts	Qualification	MAR	ZAM	TIT	YAR
1	Marítimo de La Guaira	6	4	2	0	13	7	+6	14	Advance to the knockout stage	—	2–1	3–2	1–0
2	Zamora	6	2	3	1	9	7	+2	9		2–2	—	1–1	3–2
3	Titanes	6	1	3	2	5	7	−2	6		1–1	0–0	—	1–0
4	Yaracuyanos	6	1	0	5	5	11	−6	3		1–4	0–2	2–0	—

Source: Flashscore
Rules for classification: 1) Points; 2) Goal difference; 3) Goals scored; 4) Head-to-head results; 5) Drawing of lots.

=== Group D ===
Pos	Team	Pld	W	D	L	GF	GA	GD	Pts	Qualification	MON	MIN	BOL	ANG
1	Monagas	6	5	1	0	13	5	+8	16	Advance to the knockout stage	—	1–0	1–0	3–1
2	Mineros de Guayana	6	3	0	3	12	8	+4	9		2–3	—	5–0	2–1
3	Bolívar	6	2	2	2	5	8	−3	8		0–0	2–1	—	1–1
4	Angostura	6	0	1	5	6	15	−9	1		2–5	1–2	0–2	—

Source: Flashscore
Rules for classification: 1) Points; 2) Goal difference; 3) Goals scored; 4) Head-to-head results; 5) Drawing of lots.

=== Group E ===
Pos	Team	Pld	W	D	L	GF	GA	GD	Pts	Qualification	RAY	BAR	HEF	TRU
1	Rayo Zuliano	6	4	1	1	14	4	+10	13	Advance to the knockout stage	—	4–0	5–0	1–1
2	Barquisimeto	6	4	0	2	12	9	+3	12	Advance to the knockout stage	2–0	—	4–0	1–0
3	Héroes de Falcón	6	2	0	4	6	14	−8	6		0–1	2–1	—	2–0
4	Trujillanos	6	1	1	4	8	13	−5	4		1–3	3–4	3–2	—

Source: Flashscore
Rules for classification: 1) Points; 2) Goal difference; 3) Goals scored; 4) Head-to-head results; 5) Drawing of lots.

=== Ranking of group runners-up ===
The three best teams among those ranked second in their groups advanced to the knockout stage.

Pos	Grp	Team	Pld	W	D	L	GF	GA	GD	Pts	Qualification
1	E	Barquisimeto	6	4	0	2	12	9	+3	12	Advance to the knockout stage
2	A	Dynamo Puerto	6	3	1	2	11	9	+2	10	Advance to the knockout stage
3	B	Real Frontera	6	3	1	2	7	6	+1	10	Advance to the knockout stage
4	D	Mineros de Guayana	6	3	0	3	12	8	+4	9	
5	C	Zamora	6	2	3	1	9	7	+2	9	

Source: Flashscore
Rules for classification: 1) Points; 2) Goal difference; 3) Goals scored; 4) Drawing of lots.

== Knockout stage ==
=== Bracket ===
Round of 16
Marítimo de La Guaira	0	2	2
Anzoátegui	0	3	3
Barquisimeto	0	2	2
Universidad Central	1	2	3
Caracas	2	2	4
Metropolitanos	0	2	2
Real Frontera	0	0	0
Deportivo La Guaira	1	2	3
Monagas	2	3	5
Academia Puerto Cabello	0	2	2
Rayo Zuliano	0	1	1
Deportivo Táchira	2	4	6
Estudiantes de Mérida	2	0	2 (4)
Portuguesa (p)	2	0	2 (5)
Dynamo Puerto	0	0	0
Carabobo	1	5	6

Quarter-finals
Anzoátegui	2	1	3
Universidad Central	4	1	5
Caracas	0	0	0
Deportivo La Guaira	1	1	2
Monagas	1	1	2
Deportivo Táchira	0	0	0
Portuguesa	1	0	1
Carabobo	1	5	6

Semi-finals
Universidad Central	2	1	3
Deportivo La Guaira	0	1	1
Monagas	1	1	2
Carabobo	1	3	4

Finals
Universidad Central (p)	0	0	0 (4)
Carabobo	0	0	0 (3)

=== Round of 16 ===
Team 1	Agg.	Team 2	1st leg	2nd leg
Real Frontera	0–3	Deportivo La Guaira	0–1	0–2
Dynamo Puerto	0–6	Carabobo	0–1	0–5
Barquisimeto	2–3	Universidad Central	0–1	2–2
Rayo Zuliano	1–6	Deportivo Táchira	0–2	1–4
Monagas	5–2	Academia Puerto Cabello	2–0	3–2
Marítimo de La Guaira	2–3	Anzoátegui	0–0	2–3
Estudiantes de Mérida	2–2 (4–5 p)	Portuguesa	2–2	0–0
Caracas	4–2	Metropolitanos	2–0	2–2

==== First leg ====
29 July 2025	Real Frontera	0–1	Deportivo La Guaira	San Cristóbal
15:30 UTC−4		Report	Osío 56'	Stadium: JHS; Referee: Rafael Torres

29 July 2025	Rayo Zuliano	0–2	Deportivo Táchira	Maracaibo
15:30 UTC−4		Report	Zúñiga 47'; Duarte 59'	Stadium: José Pachencho Romero; Referee: Miguel Rosales

29 July 2025	Monagas	2–0	Academia Puerto Cabello	Maturín
15:30 UTC−4	Romero 59'; L. Rodríguez 76'	Report		Stadium: Alexander Botinni; Referee: Reyes Soto

29 July 2025	Marítimo de La Guaira	0–0	Anzoátegui	Caraballeda
17:00 UTC−4		Report		Stadium: Camurí Chico; Referee: Jesús Valenzuela

29 July 2025	Estudiantes de Mérida	2–2	Portuguesa	Mérida
18:00 UTC−4	Alderete 2'; Hernández 65'	Report	Zúñiga 67'; Gómez 71'	Stadium: Metropolitano; Referee: Alexis Herrera

29 July 2025	Caracas	2–0	Metropolitanos	Caracas
18:00 UTC−4	Tegües 62'; Covea 89'	Report		Stadium: Olímpico de la UCV; Referee: Yeferzon Miranda

29 July 2025	Dynamo Puerto	0–1	Carabobo	Puerto La Cruz
19:30 UTC−4		Report	Silva 16'	Stadium: Francisco Massiani; Referee: Gabriel Velásquez

30 July 2025	Barquisimeto	0–1	Universidad Central	Barquisimeto
17:30 UTC−4		Report	Sosa 57'	Stadium: Farid Richa; Referee: Yember Mora

==== Second leg ====
5 August 2025	Deportivo La Guaira	2–0 (3–0 agg.)	Real Frontera	Caracas
18:00 UTC−4	Castillo 44'; Sulbarán 45+2' (pen.)	Report		Stadium: Olímpico de la UCV; Referee: Alexis Herrera

6 August 2025	Carabobo	5–0 (6–0 agg.)	Dynamo Puerto	Valencia
16:00 UTC−4	Riasco 30', 46', 90+3'; Ramos 44'; Lucena 79'	Report		Stadium: Misael Delgado; Referee: Leinny Rodríguez

6 August 2025	Metropolitanos	2–2 (2–4 agg.)	Caracas	Caracas
16:00 UTC−4	Ramírez 41'; Blanco 90+2'	Report	Vegas 19'; Murillo 57'	Stadium: Olímpico de la UCV; Referee: Ángel Arteaga

6 August 2025	Academia Puerto Cabello	2–3 (2–5 agg.)	Monagas	Puerto Cabello
18:00 UTC−4	Arace 31' (pen.), 63' (pen.)	Report	Basante 27', 66'; Sulbarán 42'	Stadium: La Bombonerita; Referee: Stalin Rondón

6 August 2025	Anzoátegui	3–2 (3–2 agg.)	Marítimo de La Guaira	Puerto La Cruz
18:00 UTC−4	Castellano 12'; Graterol 35'; Blanco 71' (pen.)	Report	Altamar 19'; Escobar 83'	Stadium: José Antonio Anzoátegui; Referee: José Uzcátegui

6 August 2025	Portuguesa	0–0 (2–2 agg.) (5–4 p)	Estudiantes de Mérida	Acarigua
18:00 UTC−4		Report		Stadium: General José Antonio Páez; Referee: Carlos Parra
	Penalties
	Marchán (penalty scored); Montero (penalty scored); Colmenarez (penalty scored); Soto (penalty scored); López (penalty scored)		(penalty missed) Rojas; (penalty scored) Alderete; (penalty scored) Ramírez; (penalty scored) Fernández; (penalty scored) Hernández

6 August 2025	Deportivo Táchira	4–1 (6–1 agg.)	Rayo Zuliano	San Cristóbal
19:00 UTC−4	Duarte 32'; Jiménez 45+2' (o.g.); J. Castillo 57'; Cano 77'	Report	Paz 35'	Stadium: Polideportivo de Pueblo Nuevo; Referee: Reyes Soto

6 August 2025	Universidad Central	2–2 (3–2 agg.)	Barquisimeto	Caracas
20:00 UTC−4	Carrillo 87', 90+3'	Report	Ramos 5'; Flores 15'	Stadium: Olímpico de la UCV; Referee: Rony Cueva

=== Quarter-finals ===
Team 1	Agg.	Team 2	1st leg	2nd leg
Caracas	0–2	Deportivo La Guaira	0–1	0–1
Portuguesa	1–6	Carabobo	1–1	0–5
Anzoátegui	3–5	Universidad Central	2–4	1–1
Monagas	2–0	Deportivo Táchira	1–0	1–0

==== First leg ====
19 August 2025	Portuguesa	1–1	Carabobo	Acarigua
18:00 UTC−4	Silva 19' (o.g.)	Report	Lucena 35'	Stadium: General José Antonio Páez; Referee: Alejandro Velásquez

19 August 2025	Anzoátegui	2–4	Universidad Central	Puerto La Cruz
18:00 UTC−4	Santos 19'; Blanco 90+3'	Report	Polo 33'; Simarra 38'; De Souza 74'; Machís 77'	Stadium: José Antonio Anzoátegui; Referee: Carlos Parra

20 August 2025	Monagas	1–0	Deportivo Táchira	Maturín
15:30 UTC−4	Basante 68'	Report		Stadium: Alexander Botinni; Referee: Reyes Soto

20 August 2025	Caracas	0–1	Deportivo La Guaira	Caracas
18:00 UTC−4		Report	Rivas 90+5'	Stadium: Olímpico de la UCV; Referee: José Uzcátegui

==== Second leg ====
27 August 2025	Carabobo	5–0 (6–1 agg.)	Portuguesa	Valencia
16:00 UTC−4	Lucena 6'; Riasco 41' (pen.); Orozco 63'; Londoño 72', 76'	Report		Stadium: Misael Delgado; Referee: Carlos Parra

27 August 2025	Universidad Central	1–1 (5–3 agg.)	Anzoátegui	Caracas
16:00 UTC−4	De Souza 67'	Report	Castellano 7'	Stadium: Olímpico de la UCV; Referee: Alexis Herrera

27 August 2025	Deportivo La Guaira	1–0 (2–0 agg.)	Caracas	Caracas
20:00 UTC−4	Rivas 26'	Report		Stadium: Olímpico de la UCV; Referee: Emikar Calderas

3 September 2025	Deportivo Táchira	0–1 (0–2 agg.)	Monagas	San Cristóbal
19:00 UTC−4		Report	Navas 35'	Stadium: Polideportivo de Pueblo Nuevo; Referee: Yender Herrera
Note: Match originally scheduled for 27 August 2025.

=== Semi-finals ===
Team 1	Agg.	Team 2	1st leg	2nd leg
Universidad Central	3–1	Deportivo La Guaira	2–0	1–1
Monagas	2–4	Carabobo	1–1	1–3

==== First leg ====
10 September 2025	Universidad Central	2–0	Deportivo La Guaira	Caracas
18:00 UTC−4	Cuesta 61'; De Souza 72'	Report		Stadium: Olímpico de la UCV; Referee: Alexis Herrera

17 September 2025	Monagas	1–1	Carabobo	Maturín
15:30 UTC−4	Caraballo 78'	Report	Alegría 65'	Stadium: Alexander Botinni; Referee: Alejandro Velásquez

==== Second leg ====
17 September 2025	Deportivo La Guaira	1–1 (1–3 agg.)	Universidad Central	Caracas
18:00 UTC−4	Uribe 47'	Report	De Souza 90+2'	Stadium: Olímpico de la UCV; Referee: Rony Cueva

24 September 2025	Carabobo	3–1 (4–2 agg.)	Monagas	Valencia
16:00 UTC−4	Riasco 43'; N. Rodríguez 82'; Londoño 86'	Report	T. Rodríguez 90+3' (pen.)	Stadium: Misael Delgado; Referee: Carlos Parra

=== Finals ===
1 October 2025
19:00 UTC−4

Universidad Central	0–0	Carabobo
	Report

Estadio Olímpico de la UCV, Caracas
Referee: Yender Herrera

8 October 2025
19:00 UTC−4

Carabobo	0–0	Universidad Central
	Report
Penalties
Núñez (penalty scored); Aponte (penalty scored); Rodríguez (penalty missed); Del Valle (penalty scored); Orozco (penalty missed)	3–4	(penalty scored) Zapata; (penalty missed) Sosa; (penalty scored) Cuesta; (penalty scored) De Souza; (penalty scored) Solé

Estadio Misael Delgado, Valencia
Referee: Rony Cueva

Tied 0–0 on aggregate, Universidad Central won on penalties.

== See also ==
- 2025 Venezuelan Primera División season
