= 2024 Copa Venezuela =

Copa Venezuela Luis Mendoza 2024

Tournament details
- Country: Venezuela
- Dates: 6 June – 20 July 2024
- Teams: 30

Final positions
- Champions: Deportivo La Guaira (3rd title)
- Runners-up: Metropolitanos

Tournament statistics
- Matches played: 75
- Goals scored: 191 (2.55 per match)
- Top goal scorer(s): Jhon Escobar; Tomás Rodríguez (6 goals each)

The 2024 Copa Venezuela, officially named Copa Venezuela Luis Mendoza 2024, was the 51st edition of the Venezuelan football cup, which returned after a five-year hiatus. The competition began on 6 June with the participation of 14 Primera División and 16 Segunda División teams, and ended on 20 July 2024. The final match, which was originally slated to be played at Estadio Metropolitano de Cabudare, was ultimately moved to Estadio Brígido Iriarte in Caracas.

Deportivo La Guaira won their third title in the competition, after defeating Metropolitanos 1–0 in the final. Zamora were the defending champions, having won the tournament in its most recent edition held in 2019, but were defeated by Academia Puerto Cabello in the round of 16.

== Format ==
For this year, the 30 participating teams were divided into ten groups of three teams each, according to geographical location and also considering the inclusion of at least one Segunda División team in each group. In the group stage, teams played each one of their group rivals twice (once at home and once away), with the ten group winners and the six best group runners-up advancing to the knockout stage. Matches in the knockout rounds (round of 16, quarter-finals, semi-finals, and final) were played over a single leg, with the home team in each matchup being decided by a draw.

== Group stage ==
=== Group A ===
Pos	Team	Pld	W	D	L	GF	GA	GD	Pts	Qualification	MET	CAR	DMI
1	Metropolitanos	4	3	0	1	7	4	+3	9	Advance to the knockout stage	—	2–1	2–0
2	Caracas	4	2	0	2	6	5	+1	6		2–1	—	2–0
3	Deportivo Miranda	4	1	0	3	3	7	−4	3		1–2	2–1	—

Source: Soccerway
Legend: Blue = home team win; Yellow = draw; Red = away team win.
Rules for classification: 1) Points; 2) Goal difference; 3) Goals scored; 4) Head-to-head results; 5) Drawing of lots.

=== Group B ===
Pos	Team	Pld	W	D	L	GF	GA	GD	Pts	Qualification	APC	YAR	CBO
1	Academia Puerto Cabello	4	3	0	1	6	2	+4	9	Advance to the knockout stage	—	3–0	0–1
2	Yaracuyanos	4	2	0	2	4	4	0	6		0–1	—	2–0
3	Carabobo	4	1	0	3	2	6	−4	3		1–2	0–2	—

Source: Soccerway
Legend: Blue = home team win; Yellow = draw; Red = away team win.
Rules for classification: 1) Points; 2) Goal difference; 3) Goals scored; 4) Head-to-head results; 5) Drawing of lots.

=== Group C ===
Pos	Team	Pld	W	D	L	GF	GA	GD	Pts	Qualification	BOL	ANG	AIF
1	Bolívar	4	2	2	0	3	1	+2	8	Advance to the knockout stage	—	0–0	0–0
2	Angostura	4	2	1	1	4	1	+3	7	Advance to the knockout stage	0–1	—	3–0
3	AIFI Guayana	4	0	1	3	1	6	−5	1		1–2	0–1	—

Source: Soccerway
Legend: Blue = home team win; Yellow = draw; Red = away team win.
Rules for classification: 1) Points; 2) Goal difference; 3) Goals scored; 4) Head-to-head results; 5) Drawing of lots.

=== Group D ===
Pos	Team	Pld	W	D	L	GF	GA	GD	Pts	Qualification	ESM	INT	VIG
1	Estudiantes de Mérida	4	2	2	0	7	4	+3	8	Advance to the knockout stage	—	3–2	4–2
2	Inter de Barinas	4	2	1	1	6	5	+1	7	Advance to the knockout stage	0–0	—	2–1
3	El Vigía	4	0	1	3	4	8	−4	1		0–0	1–2	—

Source: Soccerway
Legend: Blue = home team win; Yellow = draw; Red = away team win.
Rules for classification: 1) Points; 2) Goal difference; 3) Goals scored; 4) Head-to-head results; 5) Drawing of lots.

=== Group E ===
Pos	Team	Pld	W	D	L	GF	GA	GD	Pts	Qualification	ANZ	UCV	NES
1	Anzoátegui	4	3	1	0	6	1	+5	10	Advance to the knockout stage	—	1–0	4–1
2	Universidad Central	4	2	1	1	3	2	+1	7	Advance to the knockout stage	0–0	—	1–0
3	Nueva Esparta	4	0	0	4	2	8	−6	0		0–1	1–2	—

Source: Soccerway
Legend: Blue = home team win; Yellow = draw; Red = away team win.
Rules for classification: 1) Points; 2) Goal difference; 3) Goals scored; 4) Head-to-head results; 5) Drawing of lots.

=== Group F ===
Pos	Team	Pld	W	D	L	GF	GA	GD	Pts	Qualification	TAC	URE	REF
1	Deportivo Táchira	4	3	0	1	12	4	+8	9	Advance to the knockout stage	—	5–1	5–1
2	Ureña	4	2	0	2	7	13	−6	6		2–1	—	3–1
3	Real Frontera	4	1	0	3	8	10	−2	3		0–1	6–1	—

Source: Soccerway
Legend: Blue = home team win; Yellow = draw; Red = away team win.
Rules for classification: 1) Points; 2) Goal difference; 3) Goals scored; 4) Head-to-head results; 5) Drawing of lots.

=== Group G ===
Pos	Team	Pld	W	D	L	GF	GA	GD	Pts	Qualification	DLG	MAR	ARA
1	Deportivo La Guaira	4	2	1	1	8	7	+1	7	Advance to the knockout stage	—	3–3	3–0
2	Marítimo de La Guaira	4	1	3	0	8	5	+3	6	Advance to the knockout stage	3–0	—	2–2
3	Aragua	4	0	2	2	3	7	−4	2		1–2	0–0	—

Source: Soccerway
Legend: Blue = home team win; Yellow = draw; Red = away team win.
Rules for classification: 1) Points; 2) Goal difference; 3) Goals scored; 4) Head-to-head results; 5) Drawing of lots.

=== Group H ===
Pos	Team	Pld	W	D	L	GF	GA	GD	Pts	Qualification	ZAM	POR	ACR
1	Zamora	4	2	1	1	4	3	+1	7	Advance to the knockout stage	—	0–1	1–0
2	Portuguesa	4	2	0	2	5	5	0	6		1–2	—	0–1
3	Academia Rey	4	1	1	2	4	5	−1	4		1–1	2–3	—

Source: Soccerway
Legend: Blue = home team win; Yellow = draw; Red = away team win.
Rules for classification: 1) Points; 2) Goal difference; 3) Goals scored; 4) Head-to-head results; 5) Drawing of lots.

=== Group I ===
Pos	Team	Pld	W	D	L	GF	GA	GD	Pts	Qualification	MON	ALC	DYP
1	Monagas	4	3	1	0	14	4	+10	10	Advance to the knockout stage	—	5–1	6–1
2	Atlético La Cruz	4	2	1	1	7	5	+2	7	Advance to the knockout stage	0–0	—	4–0
3	Dynamo Puerto	4	0	0	4	3	15	−12	0		2–3	0–2	—

Source: Soccerway
Legend: Blue = home team win; Yellow = draw; Red = away team win.
Rules for classification: 1) Points; 2) Goal difference; 3) Goals scored; 4) Head-to-head results; 5) Drawing of lots.

=== Group J ===
Pos	Team	Pld	W	D	L	GF	GA	GD	Pts	Qualification	RAY	TRU	HEF
1	Rayo Zuliano	4	2	1	1	5	3	+2	7	Advance to the knockout stage	—	3–0	2–1
2	Trujillanos	4	2	0	2	7	4	+3	6	Advance to the knockout stage	2–0	—	5–0
3	Héroes de Falcón	4	1	1	2	2	7	−5	4		0–0	1–0	—

Source: Soccerway
Legend: Blue = home team win; Yellow = draw; Red = away team win.
Rules for classification: 1) Points; 2) Goal difference; 3) Goals scored; 4) Head-to-head results; 5) Drawing of lots.

=== Ranking of group runners-up ===
The six best teams among those ranked second in their groups advanced to the knockout stage.

Pos	Grp	Team	Pld	W	D	L	GF	GA	GD	Pts	Qualification
1	C	Angostura	4	2	1	1	4	1	+3	7	Advance to the knockout stage
2	I	Atlético La Cruz	4	2	1	1	7	5	+2	7	Advance to the knockout stage
3	D	Inter de Barinas	4	2	1	1	6	5	+1	7	Advance to the knockout stage
4	E	Universidad Central	4	2	1	1	3	2	+1	7	Advance to the knockout stage
5	G	Marítimo de La Guaira	4	1	3	0	8	5	+3	6	Advance to the knockout stage
6	J	Trujillanos	4	2	0	2	7	4	+3	6	Advance to the knockout stage
7	A	Caracas	4	2	0	2	6	5	+1	6	
8	H	Portuguesa	4	2	0	2	5	5	0	6	
9	B	Yaracuyanos	4	2	0	2	4	4	0	6	
10	F	Ureña	4	2	0	2	7	13	−6	6	

Source: Soccerway
Rules for classification: 1) Points; 2) Goal difference; 3) Goals scored; 4) Drawing of lots.

== Knockout stage ==
=== Bracket ===
Round of 16
Atlético La Cruz	0 (4)
Angostura (p)	0 (5)
Trujillanos	0
Monagas	1
Academia Puerto Cabello (p)	0 (6)
Zamora	0 (5)
Inter de Barinas	2
Metropolitanos	3
Universidad Central	2
Deportivo Táchira	0
Deportivo La Guaira (p)	0 (3)
Estudiantes de Mérida	0 (1)
Bolívar	0
Rayo Zuliano	1
Anzoátegui	1
Marítimo de La Guaira	3

Quarter-finals
Angostura	1
Monagas	2
Academia Puerto Cabello	2
Metropolitanos	4
Universidad Central	0 (3)
Deportivo La Guaira (p)	0 (4)
Rayo Zuliano (p)	1 (4)
Marítimo de La Guaira	1 (3)

Semi-finals
Monagas	0
Metropolitanos	2
Deportivo La Guaira	2
Rayo Zuliano	1

Final
Metropolitanos	0
Deportivo La Guaira	1

=== Round of 16 ===
7 July 2024	Atlético La Cruz	0–0 (4–5 p)	Angostura	Maturín
15:30 UTC−4		Report		Stadium: Alexander Botinni; Referee: Alejandro Velásquez

7 July 2024	Anzoátegui	1–3	Marítimo de La Guaira	Barcelona
15:30 UTC−4	Marín 35'	Report	Escobar 11', 90+4'; Castillo 90+1'	Stadium: Club Barcelona Sport; Referee: José Maya

7 July 2024	Deportivo La Guaira	0–0 (3–1 p)	Estudiantes de Mérida	Caracas
15:30 UTC−4		Report		Stadium: Olímpico de la UCV; Referee: José Uzcátegui

7 July 2024	Trujillanos	0–1	Monagas	Valera
16:00 UTC−4		Report	Basante 15'	Stadium: José Alberto Pérez; Referee: Yorman Delgado

7 July 2024	Bolívar	0–1	Rayo Zuliano	Ciudad Guayana
17:00 UTC−4		Report	Ochoa 58'	Stadium: Polideportivo Cachamay; Referee: Emikar Calderas

7 July 2024	Inter de Barinas	2–3	Metropolitanos	Barinas
18:00 UTC−4	Gómez 63', 76' (pen.)	Report	Zorrilla 7', 81'; Garcés 68'	Stadium: Agustín Tovar; Referee: Ángel Arteaga

7 July 2024	Academia Puerto Cabello	0–0 (6–5 p)	Zamora	Puerto Cabello
18:00 UTC−4		Report		Stadium: La Bombonerita; Referee: Reyes Soto

7 July 2024	Universidad Central	2–0	Deportivo Táchira	Caracas
20:00 UTC−4	Alcócer 77'; Alvarado 87'	Report		Stadium: Olímpico de la UCV; Referee: Yender Herrera

=== Quarter-finals ===
11 July 2024	Rayo Zuliano	1–1 (4–3 p)	Marítimo de La Guaira	Maracaibo
15:30 UTC−4	Ramírez 44'	Report	Escobar 50'	Stadium: José Pachencho Romero; Referee: José Uzcátegui

11 July 2024	Angostura	1–2	Monagas	Ciudad Bolívar
17:00 UTC−4	Contreras 54'	Report	Rodríguez 12' (pen.); Basante 45+2'	Stadium: Ricardo Tulio Maya; Referee: Yeferzon Miranda

11 July 2024	Academia Puerto Cabello	2–4	Metropolitanos	Puerto Cabello
19:00 UTC−4	Cantillo 80'; Silva 85'	Report	Paraco 42', 50', 76', 89'	Stadium: La Bombonerita; Referee: Ángel Arteaga

11 July 2024	Universidad Central	0–0 (3–4 p)	Deportivo La Guaira	Caracas
19:00 UTC−4		Report		Stadium: Olímpico de la UCV; Referee: Emikar Calderas

=== Semi-finals ===
14 July 2024	Monagas	0–2	Metropolitanos	Maturín
17:00 UTC−4		Report	Marchán 27'; Fedor 57'	Stadium: Monumental

14 July 2024	Deportivo La Guaira	2–1	Rayo Zuliano	Caracas
17:00 UTC−4	Farías 38'; Osorio 70'	Report	Ramírez 27'	Stadium: Olímpico de la UCV; Referee: Jesús Valenzuela

=== Final ===
20 July 2024
17:00 UTC−4

Metropolitanos	0–1	Deportivo La Guaira
	Report	Pérez 41' (o.g.)

Estadio Brígido Iriarte, Caracas
Referee: Alejandro Velásquez

== Top scorers ==
Rank	Player	Club	Goals
1	(Colombia) Jhon Escobar	Marítimo de La Guaira	6
1	(Panama) Tomás Rodríguez	Monagas	6
3	(Venezuela) Aldry Contreras	Angostura	4
3	(Venezuela) Carlos Paraco	Metropolitanos	4
3	(Venezuela) Edder Farías	Deportivo La Guaira	4
3	(Venezuela) Kevin Díaz	Ureña	4
3	(Venezuela) José Manuel Murillo	Monagas	4
8	(Venezuela) Ander Izarra	Estudiantes de Mérida	3
8	(Venezuela) Anthony Uribe	Deportivo Táchira	3
8	(Venezuela) Brayan Alcócer	Universidad Central	3
8	(Venezuela) Carlos Gil	Trujillanos	3
8	(Venezuela) Darwin Gómez	Inter de Barinas	3
8	(Venezuela) Guillermo Marín	Anzoátegui	3
8	(Venezuela) Luis Annese	Trujillanos	3
8	(Venezuela) Víctor Viez	Yaracuyanos	3

Source: Balonazos

== See also ==
- 2024 Venezuelan Primera División season
