= 2025 Supercopa de Venezuela =

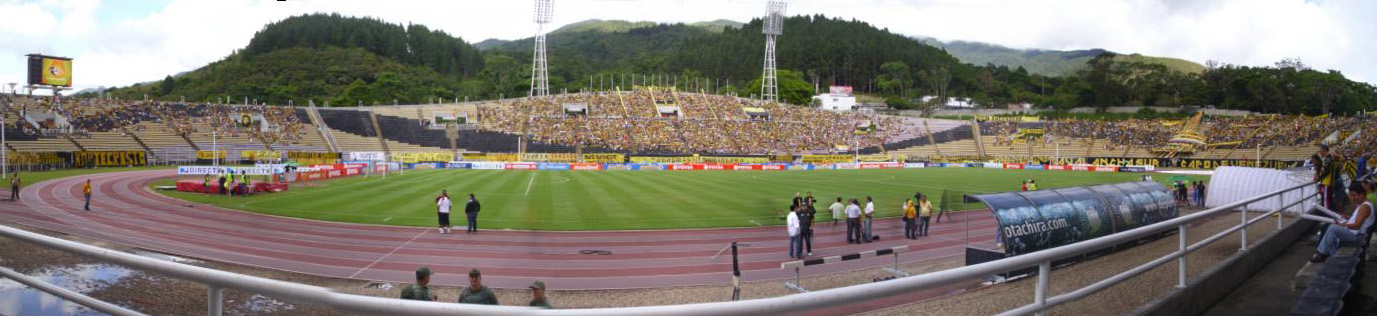
- Estadio Polideportivo de Pueblo Nuevo in San Cristóbal hosted the match.
Deportivo Táchira	Deportivo La Guaira
1	1
- After extra time Deportivo La Guaira won 4–1 on penalties
- Date: 22 March 2025
- Venue: Estadio Polideportivo de Pueblo Nuevo, San Cristóbal
- Referee: Yender Herrera

The 2025 Supercopa de Venezuela was the first edition of the Supercopa de Venezuela, Venezuela's football super cup, announced jointly by the Venezuelan Football Federation and the Liga de Fútbol Profesional Venezolano (better known as Liga FUTVE) on 11 February 2025. It was played by the 2024 Venezuelan Primera División champions Deportivo Táchira and the 2024 Copa Venezuela champions Deportivo La Guaira at Estadio Polideportivo de Pueblo Nuevo in San Cristóbal on 22 March 2025.

Deportivo La Guaira won their first Supercopa de Venezuela title in the match, defeating Deportivo Táchira on penalty kicks following a 1–1 draw after extra time.

== Teams ==
The Supercopa de Venezuela was contested by the champions of both the Primera División and the Copa Venezuela of the previous year, which for its inaugural edition are Deportivo Táchira and Deportivo La Guaira, respectively. Deportivo La Guaira won the Copa Venezuela title on 20 July 2024, defeating Metropolitanos in the final, whilst Deportivo Táchira beat Carabobo on 8 December 2024 to win the Primera División championship.

Both teams were confirmed to play the Supercopa de Venezuela on 11 February 2025, when the competition's creation was announced.

Team	Qualification
Deportivo Táchira	2024 Primera División champions
Deportivo La Guaira	2024 Copa Venezuela champions

== Details ==
22 March 2025
17:45 UTC−4

Deportivo Táchira	1–1 (a.e.t.)	Deportivo La Guaira
B. Castillo 47'	Report	S. Castillo 45+1'
Penalties
Saggiomo (penalty missed); Calzadilla (penalty scored); B. Castillo (penalty missed)	1–4	(penalty scored) Flores; (penalty scored) Castellanos; (penalty scored) Uribe; (penalty scored) Peralta

Estadio Polideportivo de Pueblo Nuevo, San Cristóbal
Referee: Yender Herrera

Deportivo Táchira	Deportivo La Guaira

GK	50	(Venezuela) Jesús Camargo
RB	33	(Venezuela) Nelson Hernández		(substituted off) 46'
CB	13	(Venezuela) Pablo Camacho
CB	22	(Argentina) Mauro Maidana
LB	18	(Venezuela) Roberto Rosales	(yellow card) 27'	(substituted off) 94'
RM	10	(Venezuela) Carlos Sosa		(substituted off) 105'
CM	11	(Venezuela) Diomar Díaz		(substituted off) 62'
CM	24	(Argentina) Juan Requena		(substituted off) 87'
LM	8	(Venezuela) Daniel Saggiomo	(yellow card) 90'
CF	17	(Venezuela) José Balza		(substituted off) 62'
CF	7	(Venezuela) Bryan Castillo	(yellow card) 25'
Substitutes:
GK	1	(Venezuela) Armando Araque
DF	4	(Venezuela) Jesús Quintero		(substituted in) 94'
DF	20	(Venezuela) Carlos Calzadilla		(substituted in) 62'
DF	23	(Venezuela) Yanniel Hernández		(substituted in) 46'
DF	32	(Venezuela) Juan David Sánchez
DF	44	(Venezuela) Edicson Tamiche
MF	19	(Venezuela) Jean Franco Castillo		(substituted in) 105'
MF	21	(Venezuela) Juan Carlos Ortiz		(substituted in) 87'
MF	38	(Venezuela) Gustavo Lozano
FW	9	(Argentina) Lucas Cano		(substituted in) 62'
FW	27	(Venezuela) Luis Zúñiga
FW	37	(Venezuela) Jesús Duarte
Manager:
(Venezuela) Edgar Pérez Greco

GK	1	(Venezuela) Eduardo Lima
RB	16	(Venezuela) Luis Casimiro Peña	(yellow card) 5'
CB	4	(Venezuela) Carlos Rivero
CB	30	(Panama) Richard Peralta
LB	16	(Venezuela) Genderson Ascanio		(substituted off) 67'
RM	31	(Venezuela) Sebastián Castillo		(substituted off) 77'
CM	24	(Venezuela) Juan Luis Perdomo	(yellow card) 45+3'	(substituted off) 97'
CM	13	(Venezuela) Rommell Ibarra	(yellow card) 22'	(substituted off) 57'
LM	21	(Venezuela) Keiber Lamadrid		(substituted off) 77'
CF	9	(Venezuela) Anthony Uribe
CF	7	(Venezuela) José Alí Meza		(substituted off) 67'
Substitutes:
GK	1	(Venezuela) Giancarlo Schiavone
DF	2	(Venezuela) Eduardo Fereira
DF	3	(Venezuela) Carlos Rojas		(substituted in) 67'
DF	48	(Venezuela) Ángel Peñaranda
MF	6	(Venezuela) Francisco Flores		(substituted in) 57'
MF	10	(Venezuela) Juan Carlos Castellanos		(substituted in) 77'
MF	11	(Venezuela) Joiser Arias
MF	15	(Venezuela) Miguel González
MF	32	(Venezuela) Manuel Sulbarán		(substituted in) 77'
MF	38	(Venezuela) Anthwan Díaz
FW	18	(Venezuela) Yackson Rivas		(substituted in) 67'
FW	70	(Venezuela) José Caraballo		(substituted in) 97'
Manager:
(Venezuela) Juan Domingo Tolisano

Assistant referees:
Lubín Torrealba
José Martínez
Fourth official:
Rafael Torres
Video assistant referee:
Marco Suárez
Assistant video assistant referee:
Reyes Soto

Match rules

- 90 minutes.
- 30 minutes of extra time if necessary.
- Penalty shoot-out if scores still level.
- Twelve named substitutes.
- Maximum of five substitutions, with a sixth allowed in extra time.
