= Daniel Sasso =

Venezuelan football manager

Personal information
- Full name: Daniel Ignacio Sasso Pacheco
- Date of birth: 12 November 1982 (age 43)
- Place of birth: Caracas, Venezuela

Managerial career
- Years: Team
- 2017–2020: Deportivo La Guaira (youth)
- 2020–2021: Venezuela U20 (assistant)
- 2021–2022: Universidad Central
- 2023–2026: Universidad Central

Daniel Ignacio Sasso Pacheco (born 12 November 1982) is a Venezuelan football manager.

== Career ==
Born in Caracas, Sasso worked at Deportivo La Guaira's under-15 and under-16 squads before being named manager of the under-20 team in February 2018. He was also an assistant of Martín Carrillo in the Venezuela under-20 national team.

On 16 June 2021, Sasso was appointed manager of Primera División side Universidad Central. On 4 May of the following year, he left the club on a mutual agreement, but returned to the role exactly one year later.

Sasso led UCV to the league title in 2025 after a 68-year absence, and also won the 2025 Copa Venezuela to give the club their first-ever cup title and domestic double. On 16 August 2026, however, he left by mutual consent.

== Honours ==
Universidad Central

- Liga FUTVE: 2025
- Copa Venezuela: 2025
- Supercopa de Venezuela: 2026
