= Soteldo (surname) =

Soteldo is a Spanish surname. Notable people with the surname include:

- Angelo Yonnier Lucena Soteldo (born 2003), Venezuelan footballer
- Yeferson Soteldo (born 1997), Venezuelan footballer
