= The X's =

American animated television series (2005–2006)

- Genre: Comedy; Action-adventure; Science fiction Espionage; Farce
- Created by: Carlos Ramos
- Directed by: Dave Marshall
- Voices of: Patrick Warburton; Wendie Malick; Lynsey Bartilson; Jansen Panettiere; Chris Hardwick; Tom Kane; Stephen Root
- Composer: Shawn Patterson
- Country of origin: United States
- Original language: English
- No. of seasons: 1
- No. of episodes: 20 (38 segments)

Production
- Executive producer: Carlos Ramos
- Producer: Monique Beatty
- Running time: 22 minutes (two 11-minute segments)
- Production company: Nickelodeon Animation Studios

Original release
- Network: Nickelodeon
- Release: November 25, 2005 – November 25, 2006

The X's is an American animated television series created by Carlos Ramos for Nickelodeon. The series centers on a nuclear family of four highly trained spies who must conceal their identity from the outside world but normally having trouble in doing so. The show consists of a single 20-episode (38 segments) season, running from November 25, 2005, to November 25, 2006. Although it was compared to The Incredibles and Alias, Ramos has stated that the show takes inspiration from the James Bond film series, the 1960s TV series Get Smart, and the 1960s TV series The Avengers.

== Premise ==
The X's work for SUPERIOR, a covert agency sworn to defend Earth from evil. Mr. and Mrs. X have their daughter named Tuesday, their son named Truman, and many gadgets at their disposal. An organization called S.N.A.F.U. (short for Society of Nefarious and Felonious Undertakings) led by the evil Glowface is continually trying to cause trouble for the X's and other SUPERIOR agents through their plans to take over the world.

== Characters ==
=== SUPERIOR ===
- Mr. X (voiced by Patrick Warburton) is the leader and patriarch of the X's. Although a competent spy, he struggles with everyday issues, such as remembering his civilian name, which is Tucker. He is also an excellent cook and very strict and stern.
- Mrs. X (voiced by Wendie Malick) is the second-in-command, combat specialist, and matriarch of the X's. Mrs. X is fully trained in hand-to-hand combat and martial arts, but is a horrible cook. She's a very caring and protective mother to Tuesday and Truman. Her first name is Trudy.
- Tuesday X (voiced by Lynsey Bartilson) is Mr. and Mrs. X's 16-year-old teenage daughter and team investigator. Tuesday is the most normal of the team, despite her rather extreme punk-rock garb and frequently changing hair-color. She is also the most knowledgeable of "real-world" behavior which the other family members either misunderstand or ignore outright.
- Truman X (voiced by Jansen Panettiere) is Mr. and Mrs. X's 10-year-old son and technology expert. The enfant terrible of the "X"s, Truman can sometimes be a nuisance and make trouble.
- Rex X (vocal effects provided by Dee Bradley Baker) is Truman's dog who he received from Sasquatch on his 10th birthday. Rex was meant to kill Truman, but was freed from Sasquatch's mind control and became an honorary member of SUPERIOR.
- Home Base (voiced by Stephen Root) is a computerized brain that runs the X family's house. Seen from above, Home Base is shaped like an X.

=== Villains ===
- S.N.A.F.U. (short for Society of Nefarious and Felonious Undertakings) is an evil organization that the X's fight.
  - Glowface (voiced by Chris Hardwick) is the X's' archenemy, the leader of S.N.A.F.U., and the main antagonist of the series. Glowface's head is encased in a glass globe with electrical discharges. He wears a rubber suit and gloves to contain his vast energies. He is megalomaniacal, arrogant, psychotic, loudmouthed, and delusional, and believes himself to be much more of a threat than he actually is.
  - Lorenzo Suave (voiced by Tom Kane) is Glowface's right-hand man and butler. Lorenzo is stylishly and impeccably dressed with a mustache, goatee, a scar along one cheek, and both an eyepatch and a monocle. Lorenzo is much more intelligent than Glowface and sometimes has to maneuver him into completing his plans.
  - Sasquatch (voiced by Randy Savage) is a member of S.N.A.F.U. who resembles his namesake and seeks to return the animals to their rightful place as masters of the planet. His roar can brainwash animals to do his bidding.
  - Brandon (voiced by Jason Schwartzman in "The Spy Who Liked Me" and David Hornsby in later appearances) is Glowface's nephew who works at an intern for S.N.A.F.U. He and Tuesday are dating much to the dismay of Mr. X and Glowface.
  - The Scream Queens are a duo of banshee-esque cheerleaders who possess sonic screams.
  - The McVampires are a family of hillbilly vampires. The family consists of an unnamed father, an unnamed mother, an unnamed son, and an unnamed grandmother. The McVampires' name is a spoof of the McCoy family.
  - Bio Harold (voiced by Chris Hardwick) is a buff guy in a hazmat suit. His name seems to be a pun on the term "Bio Hazard".
  - Missing Link is a dirty guy who looks like a chimpanzee/human hybrid. He seems to have an unhinged and primal demeanor.
  - Some Old Guy (voiced by Tom Kane) is an old man. He is not an actual member of S.N.A.F.U. and became involved with the group after believing that the photo shop that Glowface tricked the X's into entering was a nickel store.
  - The Rubber Colossus (vocal effects provided by Carlos Ramos) is an elastic rubber monster created by Glowface. Glowface built the Rubber Colossus out of stolen pink erasers and brought it to life with his electrical powers.
  - The S.N.A.F.U. Minions (voiced by Carlos Ramos) are Glowface's minions and foot-soldiers of S.N.A.F.U. They wear uniforms with their heads encased in globes.
    - Jody (voiced by Carlos Ramos) is Brandon's personal S.N.A.F.U. minion and cook.
- Copperhead (voiced by Tom Kenny) is an elusive cyborg villain who can manipulate magnetism and is not associated with S.N.A.F.U. He never stays in one place for long. Copperhead runs on batteries, with a large battery being located on his back.
- The Y's are an Indian-American family of spies and rivals of the X's.
  - Mr. Y (voiced by Ronobir Lahiri) – He is similar to Mr. X as he is the leader and patriarch of the Y's. He appears polite on the surface, but he has malicious intentions. Mr. Y likes to mock the X's in subtle ways.
  - Mrs. Y (voiced by Susan Pari) – She is similar to Mrs. X. Mrs. Y supports her family's malicious intentions. She enjoys outdoing the X's in any way she can.
  - Seven Y (voiced by Soleil Moon Frye) – She is similar to Tuesday. She received the most development in the series of all the Y's. Seven appears to be a laid-back teenage girl, but she is actually quite nasty. She specifically has an intense sibling rivalry with Tuesday.
  - Scout Y (voiced by Laura Marano) – She is similar to Truman, but is a girl instead of a boy. She is deceptively sweet, but she is actually quite destructive like Truman
  - Fortress (voiced by Marlene Sanders) - An artificial intelligence that runs the house the Y's live in. Fortress is similar to Homebase, but is violent and more advanced than Homebase.

=== Recurring ===
- Kimla Meeks (voiced by Ashley Johnson) is Tuesday's friend. She is a huge fan of science fiction and is also very knowledgeable about sci-fi movies, comics, etc.
- Skipper Swenson (voiced by Lindsay Sloane) is Tuesday's friend. Skipper is generally stuck-up and is rude to Tuesday. She doesn't like Tuesday very much and only came to her slumber party because Mrs. X apparently promised to pay her fifty dollars. Skipper is very popular and is also shown to have an interest in beauty and boys.
- Annasthesia Montiho (voiced by Soleil Moon Frye) is Tuesday's friend. She is a goth girl and notices the strange occurrences at Tuesday's slumber party. She also likes to talk about boys.
- Wally (voiced by Tom Kenny) is a friendly neighbor of the X's. He is a devoted father with a wife and child. Wally is very nice to the X's whenever he sees them. While he's suspicious of the X's at times, he never catches on that they are spies.
  - Mrs. Wally (voiced by April Kaplan) is the wife of Wally. She is a devoted mother and wife, and she has a friendly demeanor.
  - Wally Jr. (voiced by Dee Bradley Baker) is the baby of Wally and "Mrs. Wally." Truman refers to him as simply "Junior."
- Andrea (voiced by Laura Marano) is a violent girl who picks on and beats up Truman due to having a crush on him.

=== Other ===
- Pork E. Bacon (voiced by Will Arnett) is the mascot of the Pork E. Bacon restaurant that Truman and Andrea go on a date to.
- The Mayor (voiced by April Winchell) is an unnamed mayor of the city that the X's live in. She seems very proper and civilized.
- The Reaper Kid (voiced by Paul Butcher) is a disguise used by Glowface in "The Haunting of Homebase".
- Miguel (voiced by Paco Jimenez, later by Flaco Jiminez) is a character from a Spanish soap opera that the X's watch.
- Nita (voiced by Andrea Zafra) is Miguel's girlfriend in the Spanish soap opera that the X's watch.
- Stanley (voiced by M. Emmet Walsh) and Louise (voiced by Jessica Walter) are Mrs. X's parents and Tuesday and Truman's maternal grandparents. The two work as police officers and do not know that the X's are spies.
- Tranquilizer (voiced by George Takei) is a man that runs a tranquility retreat that Mrs. X attends in "No More Mrs. Nice X".
  - Ed (voiced by Carlos Ramos) is one of the Tranquilizer's clients at his tranquility retreat.
- Viper (voiced by Keone Young) is the host of a Japanese television program called Tokyo Video.
- Soda Jerk/Counter Guy (voiced by Carlos Ramos) is a young man with acne who has worked as a food server for a couple of different restaurants/food stands.
- Paul (voiced by Axel Alba) is a boy and Truman's friend.
- Grocerama Company Spokesmodel (voiced by Erica Luttrell) appears in "Wealth vs. Stealth." She is a spokesmodel for the Grocerama Company, a large retail chain.
- The Ambassador of Pandravea (voiced by Stephen Root) is an ambassador who the X's are assigned to protect him while he visits the Museum of Art in "AAIIEE, Robot".
- Robo-Mom (voiced by Carlos Ramos) is a robot hastily built by Truman to replace Mrs. X after she breaks her leg in "AAIIEE, Robot".
- Extreme Homebase (voiced by Shadoe Stevens) is the artificial intelligence program that runs the miniature replica of the house the X's live in.
- The Z's are of Australian descent. Truman stated that SUPERIOR said that their death was an accident, but the Y's hinted that their death was no accident and that they caused it.

== Episodes ==
=== Series overview ===
Season	Episodes	Originally released	
Season	Episodes	First released	Last released
1	20	November 25, 2005	November 25, 2006

Dave Marshall directed every episode of the series.

The final episode, "Theater of War" / "Breaking Camp", remains unaired in the United States, but was aired in Europe and Asia.

No.	Title	Written by	Storyboard by	Original release date	Prod. code
1a	"AAIIEE, Robot!"	Doug Langdale	Jim Smith	November 25, 2005	105a
Mrs. X breaks her leg during a mission. To solve this problem, Truman builds a robot to replace her. Unfortunately, this does not seem to work well. Meanwhile, Mrs. X is sad that she cannot help her family during missions while recovering.
1b	"Mission: Irresponsible"	Carlos Ramos	Jim Smith, Roque Ballesteros, Alan Lau, and Brad Rau	November 25, 2005	105b
SUPERIOR decides to take Mr. and Mrs. X out of their ranks as punishment for destroying Stonehenge, as they have Home Base place Truman and Tuesday in command instead.
2a	"License to Slumber"	Doug Langdale	Vincent Waller	November 25, 2005	103a
Mrs. X arranges a slumber party for Tuesday; during it, the family begins to fight Glowface. Tuesday tries to cover up the truth about her family.
2b	"Three Days of the Coin-Op"	Ralph Soll	Vincent Waller	November 25, 2005	103b
Truman's unauthorized upgrade of Home Base forces the computer offline for a day. They try to work to get all the household chores done before an inspector from SUPERIOR shows up. If anything is out of place, the X's will be sent to a foreign country to herd farting goats.
3a	"Photo Ops"	Gene Grillo	Carlos Ramos, Carl Greenblatt, Erik C. Wiese, Carey Yost, and Joe Daniello	November 25, 2005	101a
The X's get a family portrait taken in order to try to blend in as a normal family. Unfortunately, this turns out to be an ambush by S.N.A.F.U. as Glowface leads Lorenzo Suave, Sasquatch, the Scream Queens, the McVampires, Bio-Harold, Missing Link, and Some Old Guy into attacking the X's.
3b	"Boy's Best Fiend"	Mike Ryan	Li Hong	November 25, 2005	101b
After missing every birthday celebration because of world-saving missions, Truman gets a puppy for his birthday and names it "Rex", but it turns out it is from Sasquatch, who has amassed an animal army.
4a	"Mr. Fix It"	John Behnke & Rob Humphrey	Li Hong	December 9, 2005	104a
In his effort to pass for a normal dad, Mr. X learns that normal dads fix things, so he begins to do that. Of course, he's terrible at it.
4b	"Doommates"	John Behnke & Rob Humphrey	Li Hong, Chong Lee, and Jim Smith	December 9, 2005	104b
Truman and Tuesday are forced to share a room, after Truman's room accidentally goes nuclear.
5a	"Secret Agent Manual"	Doug Langdale	Carlos Ramos	December 16, 2005	102a
Mrs. X and the kids trick Mr. X into giving them stuff they want, by rewriting his official spy manual with the Retextinator to include the items they desire.
5b	"The Spy Who Liked Me"	Gene Grillo	Vincent Waller	December 16, 2005	102b
Tuesday's first date is with a guy named Brandon who is too good to be true: in fact, he is a spy working undercover for his uncle Glowface.
6a	"To Err is Truman"	Earl Kress	Roque Ballesteros, Alan Lau, and Brad Rau	January 13, 2006	106a
Truman attempts to be good and refrain from pulling pranks for one entire day, so he may join his family at the "world's greatest" amusement park.
6b	"No More Mrs. Nice X"	Doug Langdale	Louie del Carmen	January 13, 2006	106b
Mrs. X is filled with peace and tranquility, after she returns from a retreat. Unfortunately, these qualities prove useless when confronting Glowface.
7a	"On Her Majesty's Postal Service"	Scott Peterson	Li Hong and Andy Kelly	February 3, 2006	108a
Mr. X gets a job as a mailman due to the lack of recent activity from Glowface. Meanwhile, Sasquatch works to breed the ultimate dog.
7b	"Pinheads"	Duane Colbert & Shahrzad Warkentin	Jim Smith	February 3, 2006	108b
Tuesday wants the family to learn how to bowl. Their lessons get crashed by Glowface, Lorenzo Suave, Sasquatch, and Brandon who were annoyed that they are bowling when not trying to stop their heists. Note: This episode guest stars John Kricfalusi, creator of The Ren & Stimpy Show as the Bowling Alley Guy. This was Kricfalusi's first time at Nickelodeon after he was fired after season 2 of Ren & Stimpy.
8a	"From Crusha with Love"	John Behnke & Rob Humphrey	Andy Kelly	February 17, 2006	111a
A girl at school picks on Truman, but he finds out it is because she has a crush on him. The rest of the X's each try to help Truman win her over during his date. Note: This episode guest stars Will Arnett as Pork E. Bacon.
8b	"Xcitement"	John Behnke & Rob Humphrey	Andy Kelly	February 17, 2006	111b
Mr. X has a dirty little secret that is locking him away from being a spy and hanging with his family, but what could it be?
9a	"You Only Sneeze Twice"	Carlos Ramos	Li Hong	February 24, 2006	110a
The entire family gets sick, except for Tuesday. The same thing happens at S.N.A.F.U. HQ where Glowface, Sasquatch, and the Scream Queens get sick, leaving Lorenzo Suave to care for them. Seeing this as an opportunity to do one of his plots, Lorenzo begins his plot for world conquest, which attracts Tuesday's attention.
9b	"X Takes a Holiday"	Doug Langdale	Li Hong, Andy Kelly, Carlos Ramos, and Marcelo Souza	February 24, 2006	110b
Mr. and Mrs. X go on a romantic date, but while they are away, Tuesday and Truman throw a party. Glowface seizes the opportunity to attack Home Base.
10a	"Mock Tutors"	John Behnke & Rob Humphrey	Andy Kelly	March 3, 2006	109a
Truman and Tuesday are failing their cooking and tennis classes (Tuesday with cooking; Truman with tennis). They'll be forced to go to summer school if they fail their test. So their parents try to help them with those subjects. Mrs. X helps Tuesday and Mr. X helps Truman; the only problem is that Mrs. X, who is a good tennis player, turns out to be a terrible cook while Mr. X, who is a good cook, turns out to be a terrible tennis player!
10b	"Meddle Mouth"	John Behnke & Rob Humphrey	Jim Smith	March 3, 2006	109b
Truman finds the perfect opportunity to drive Tuesday crazy, when she gets braces. He interferes with her braces to make Tuesday say crazy things, while she is on her date with Brandon.
11a	"Family Issues"	Tracy Berna	Li Hong	March 17, 2006	107a
In their continuous effort to be like "normal families", the X's visit a family counselor to see what kind of issues "normal families" have. However, it is not long before they start to take their "roles" too seriously.
11b	"Truman's Choice"	Doug Langdale	Roque Ballesteros, Alan Lau, and Brad Rau	March 17, 2006	107b
Truman gets a chance to capture the most wanted and elusive villain which is Copperhead. The rest of the family begin to suck up to Truman to capture Copperhead with him. Though a twist with Truman failing to choose in time leads to Copperhead showing up.
12a	"Wealth vs. Stealth"	Doug Langdale	Li Hong, Andy Kelly, and Carlos Ramos	April 7, 2006	112a
When the X's win a billion dollars, they must balance their new fame and fortune with their spy work.
12b	"Wee House"	Carlos Ramos	Jim Smith	April 7, 2006	112b
Sick and tired of being short, Truman builds a small replica of Home Base for him to live in, until he misses his family.
13	"Truman X: Super Villain"	Carlos Ramos	Li Hong, Andy Kelly, Carlos Ramos, and Jim Smith	June 16, 2006	113
When the X's punish Truman for hotdogging a mission and blowing up the X jet by selling all of his spy gadgets, Glowface persuades the boy to join S.N.A.F.U., his first mission: destroy the X's.
14a	"A Truman Scorned"	Scott Peterson	Andy Kelly	September 22, 2006	114a
Truman has a crush on Tuesday's friend Kimla. Truman realizes there's only one way to get past this "little kid" thing – he has to tell her he's really an international super spy. Not surprisingly, Kimla doesn't believe him. Surprisingly, she continues to disbelieve his story even when he sneaks her along on a mission and the truth is right in front of her nose.
14b	"Y's Up"	Rob Humphrey & John Behnke	Andy Kelly and Jim Smith	September 22, 2006	114b
The archrivals of the X's, the Y's, move in next door. The X's suspect they are up to no good, but cannot prove anything until the Y's show their true colors during Glowface's next plot.
15a	"Quit Your Day Job"	Tracy Berna	Jim Smith	September 29, 2006	115a
When Tuesday is suspicious of Brandon, the X's find out that he is a part-time S.N.A.F.U. agent.
15b	"Missing Home"	Doug Langdale	Carlos Ramos	September 29, 2006	115b
Home Base explodes when the X's forget his birthday. Without Home Base, the X's need to survive on their own.
16a	"Live and Let Diaper"	Heather Lombard & Evan Gore	Michael Mullen and Carlos Ramos	October 6, 2006	118a
The X's have to babysit a neighbor's baby and they cannot change his diaper. Will they ever be able to change that diaper?
16b	"In-Law Enforcement"	Tracy Berna	Li Hong, Andy Kelly, and Jim Smith	October 6, 2006	118b
The X's try to prevent Mrs. X's parents Louise and Stanley from realizing that they are spies when they come for a visit. Guest-starring Jessica Walter as Louise and M. Emmet Walsh as Stanley.
17a	"Train Rex"	Rob Humphrey & John Behnke	Andy Kelly	October 13, 2006	116a
After the X's go on a mission, Truman faces an ultimatum where he has a single day to train Rex or else he will go to the pound.
17b	"Homebody"	Rob Humphrey & John Behnke	Steven DeStephano and Andy Kelly	October 13, 2006	116b
Truman creates a body for Home Base so he can carry the X's weapons, but the X's hate it. It even gives Home Base problems when he tries to stop Sasquatch, Bio-Harold, and the Scream Queens alone.
18	"The Haunting of Home Base"	Rob Humphrey & John Behnke	Li Hong, Andy Kelly, Michael Mullen, Carlos Ramos, and Jim Smith	October 27, 2006	120
Truman attempts to scare his family by turning Home Base into a haunted house, but Glowface takes control of the Home Base, and soon, Tuesday, Mr. X, and Mrs. X are zombies. Can Truman stop Glowface's evil plot before his brain is eaten?
19a	"Accidental Hero"	Alessia Costantini	Li Hong, Andy Kelly, and Michael Mullen	November 25, 2006	119a
Truman saves a baby from one of his paintball traps, and the public hail him as a hero. Tuesday tries to expose Truman as the culprit. Truman begins to realize that he may not like his new lifestyle that comes from being a public hero. Meanwhile, Glowface is jealous of Truman's public attention.
19b	"Untied"	Rob Humphrey & John Behnke	Li Hong, Andy Kelly, and Jim Smith	November 25, 2006	119b
After Mr. X's necktie reflects off Glowface's base walls, he suffers a tie loss. He now cannot fight. Can the other X's save Mr. X from his loss of "Mr. Tie-tie", or will the X's become nothing?
20a	"Theater of War"	Doug Langdale	Carlos Ramos	Unaired	117a
Brandon will play Romeo in the school play of Romeo and Juliet, and Seven Y competes with Tuesday to see who may play Juliet.
20b	"Breaking Camp"	Rob Humphrey & John Behnke	Andy Kelly and Jean Texier	Unaired	117b
Mr. X takes Truman to his favorite childhood camp, hoping he will love it, too. Turns out Truman does not, much to Mr. X's dismay.

=== Scrapped episode ===
As confirmed by Carlos Ramos on Tumblr, he had written an episode in December 2005 titled "Bro Face", which would have been about Glowface's brother coming to visit him. This story would have been a part of episode 18 or 19, given that episode 17 at that time was in production since summer 2005. Nickelodeon scrapped the episode in favor of "a more kid-centric story".

== Development and production ==
The series was pitched in 2002, with development from 2002 to 2003. Production ran from May 2004 to September 2006. The end credits of each episode reveal that in production order, the first ten episodes were completed by 2005, while the last ten were completed by 2006.

Jim Smith, an alumnus of The Ren & Stimpy Show, was a prominent storyboard artist on the series; he alongside Vincent Waller were instrumental in the formation of Nickelodeon Animation Studio, having refused to join the studio after Spümcø was terminated from the series. His longtime work partner John Kricfalusi makes a cameo appearance in an episode, despite defaming the production company at its earliest years.

After production wrapped in late 2006, Carlos Ramos and director Dave Marshall moved on to work on Ni Hao, Kai-Lan's pilot and series. Ramos left Nickelodeon in June 2007 after working as a character designer. CG supervisor Ernest Chan, along with voice director and writer Doug Langdale, moved to providing 3D special effects and writing episodes of El Tigre: The Adventures of Manny Rivera respectively.

== Broadcast ==
The series aired on Nickelodeon and premiered in the United States on November 25, 2005, with three back-to-back episodes. After the final episode aired on November 25, 2006, "Theater of War" / "Breaking Camp" remains unaired in the United States.

=== Foreign broadcast ===
The X's premiered in multiple countries throughout Latin America in 2006, along with Germany on February 10, 2007, and in South Korea from 2008 to 2009.

== Streaming and home media ==
=== Streaming ===
In 2018, series director, Dave Marshall released nearly the entire series on his Vimeo account (with the exception of 2 episodes).

The X's is available on Pluto TV and Apple TV in Mexico (however, a few episodes are missing).

=== Home media ===
While the series never saw any official complete series releases, there were two Nick Picks volumes that each included an episode in 2006 and 2007. The episode "To Err is Truman" was to be featured on the Nick Picks Vol. 6 DVD, with a release date for August 7, 2007. The DVD and the Nick Picks series overall were cancelled for unknown reasons.

Title	Episode count	Release date	Episodes
Nick Picks Vol. 4	1	June 6, 2006	"Photo Ops"
Nick Picks Vol. 5	1	March 13, 2007	"Secret Agent Manual"

== Comics ==
During the mid-2000s, Nickelodeon featured comics for The X's in Nickelodeon Magazine. It is currently unknown how many comics were produced. However, the last known comic, "In Like Fish" (written and illustrated by Kyle Baker), was featured in the October 2006 issue.

== Legacy ==
Noah Dominguez of Comic Book Resources wrote in 2021: "For what it was, The X's was a funny and charming children's spy series -- and there's definitely something to be said about its rather star-studded voice cast. But seeing as how it was canceled after one season and aired only 19 episodes, the show has mostly been lost to time."

== Awards and nominations ==
Year	Award	Category	Nominee	Work	Result
2006	Artios	Best Animated Voice-Over Television Casting	Sarah Noonan and Meredith Layne	The X's	Won
2006	Annie Award	Storyboarding in an Animated Television Production	Hong Li	"You Only Sneeze Twice"	Won
2006	Annie Award	Character Design in an Animated Television Production	Carlos Ramos	"Homebody"	Nominated
2006	Annie Award	Character Design in an Animated Television Production	Eric Robles	"You Only Sneeze Twice"	Nominated

== See also ==
- Spy × Family – Japanese animated series also about a family of spies
- The X's Pitch Bible (modified version) - 2004 (https://archive.org/details/xs-seriesbible/mode/1up)
