= Joantony Carmona =

Venezuelan footballer (born 2001)

Personal information
- Full name: Joantony Xavier Carmona Sarache
- Date of birth: 27 May 2001 (age 25)
- Place of birth: Valera, Venezuela
- Positions: Left winger; left-back

Youth career
- Trujillanos
- 2021: Atlético Mineiro
- 2021: Athletico Paranaense

Senior career*
Years	Team	Apps	(Gls)
2019–2021	Trujillanos	35	(6)
2022–2023	Monagas	12	(0)
2023–2024	UCV FC	10	(0)
- * Club domestic league appearances and goals as of 20:37, 1 September 2024 (UTC)

Joantony Xavier Carmona Sarache (born 27 May 2001) is a Venezuelan footballer who plays as a left winger.

== Club career ==
=== Trujillanos ===
Carmona was born and raised in a small neighborhood called El Milagro in Valera, Trujillo. He started playing futsal at the age of five and later joined Trujillanos.

Carmona got his official and professional debut for Trujillanos on 31 March 2019 at the age of 17 against Atlético Venezuela, when he came in as a substitute for Yohanner García in the 34th minute. He scored his first goal in his fourth league appearance for the club and ended the season with 18 games played. In the 2020 season, Carmona became a key player for Trujillanos with 18 league appearances and five goals.

=== Brazil ===
In the beginning of May 2021 it was confirmed, that Carmona had joined Brazilian club Atlético Mineiro, where he would play for the U-20 team.

However, before even playing for his new club, he left again and instead signed with Athletico Paranaense on 29 June 2021, where he also would be a part of the U-20 team.

=== Return to Venezuela ===
In March 2022, Carmona returned to Venezuela, when he signed with Monagas. In August 2023, Carmona moved to UCV FC. At the end of the year, Carmona signed a new deal until the end of 2024. He left the club again in June 2024.

In late December 2025, a journalist reported that Carmona, who had been without a club since leaving UCV FC, was training with Deportivo Rayo Zuliano.
