= Estadio 12 de Febrero =

Coordinates: 8°36′20″N 71°38′13″W

- Estadio Ramón Hernández
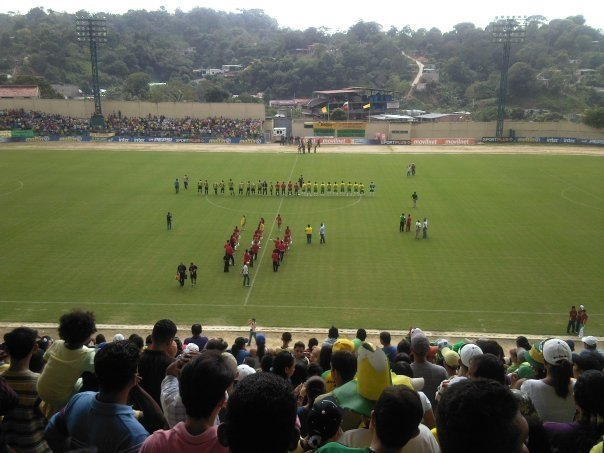
- Interactive map of Estadio 12 de Febrero
- Full name: Estadio Olímpico Ramón "Gato" Hernández
- Location: El Vigía, Venezuela
- Capacity: 12,785
- Surface: grass

Tenant
- Atlético El Vigía Fútbol Club

Estadio 12 de Febrero (also known as the Estadio Ramón Hernández) is a multi-use stadium in El Vigía, Venezuela. It is currently used mostly for football matches and is the home stadium of Atlético El Vigía Fútbol Club. The stadium holds 12,785 people.
