= Carlos Ramos =

Carlos Ramos may refer to:

- Carlos Ramos (footballer, born 1958), Chilean football striker
- Carlos Ramos Rivas (born 1959), politician from Venezuela
- Carlos Ramos (umpire) (born 1971), Portuguese tennis umpire
- Carlos Ramos (Mexican footballer) (born 1986), Mexican football defender
- Carlos Ramos (footballer, born 1999), Venezuelan football midfielder
