= Carlos Paraco =

Footballer (born 2003)

Personal information
- Full name: Carlos Miguel Paraco González
- Date of birth: 27 October 2003 (age 23)
- Place of birth: Caracas, Venezuela
- Height: 1.82 m (6 ft 0 in)
- Position: Winger

Team information
- Current team: FC Kharkiv
- Number: 10

Youth career
- –2022: Deportivo Táchira

Senior career*
Years	Team	Apps	(Gls)
2022–2024	Deportivo Táchira	5	(1)
2024–2025	Metropolitanos	34	(10)
2025–2026	Kryvbas Kryvyi Rih	28	(8)
2026–	Kharkiv	1	(0)
- * Club domestic league appearances and goals

Carlos Miguel Paraco González, for short Carlos Paraco (born 27 October 2003) is a professional Venezuelan footballer who plays as a winger for Ukrainian Premier League club FC Kharkiv.

Carlos Paraco, a native of Caracas, at the age of 10 he moved to Táchira, where he joined the Deportivo Táchira football academy, for which he has played since the under-15 football team.

In 2022, Carlos Paraco started to play for the Deportivo Táchira first team.

In 2024, he joined Metropolitanos and impressed José María Morr by scoring four goals against Academia Puerto Cabello in the 2024 Copa Venezuela quarterfinal win.

In July 2025, Paraco signed his first contract with a foreign club, leaving for Ukraine.

After a season in Kryvbas, he moved to FC Kharkiv (recently renamed Metalist 1925).
