= Supercopa de Venezuela =

- Organiser(s): FVF
- Founded: February 11, 2025; 19 months ago
- Region: Venezuela
- Teams: 2
- Related competitions: Liga FUTVE; Copa Venezuela
- Current champions: Universidad Central (1st title)
- Most championships: Deportivo La Guaira; Universidad Central (1 title each)
- 2026 Supercopa de Venezuela

The Supercopa de Venezuela (Venezuelan Supercup) is an annual one-match football official competition in Venezuela organised by the Venezuelan Football Federation (FVF) which is played between the Liga FUTVE champions and the Copa Venezuela winners of the previous season, starting from 2025. This competition serves as the season curtain-raiser and is scheduled to be played in March each year.

== Background ==
=== Copa de Campeones ===
- (In bracket, title count):

Ed.	Season	Winner	Score	Runner-up	Location
1	1965	Valencia (1)	2–1	Deportivo Galicia	Estadio Olímpico, Caracas

== Participating clubs ==
The Supercopa de Venezuela is played between:

- The Liga FUTVE champions
- The Copa Venezuela winners

== Competition format ==
- One 90-minute game
- If tied, 30 minutes of extra time are played
- If still tied at the end of extra time, penalties decide the winner

== Finals ==
Ed.	Season	Champions	Score	Runners-up	Venue
1	2025	Deportivo La Guaira (1)	1–1 (4–1 p)	Deportivo Táchira	Estadio Polideportivo de Pueblo Nuevo, San Cristóbal
2	2026	Universidad Central (1)	Match cancelled (Note: Since Universidad Central won both the 2025 Liga FUTVE and the 2025 Copa Venezuela, they were automatically awarded the 2026 Supercopa de Venezuela title.)		

== Performance by club ==
Club	Winners	Runners-up	Winning years	Runner-up years
Deportivo La Guaira	1	—	2025	—
Universidad Central	1	—	2026	—
Deportivo Táchira	—	1	—	2025
