= Federico Silvestre =

Argentine footballer

Personal information
- Full name: Federico Silvestre
- Date of birth: October 6, 1987 (age 39)
- Place of birth: Carrilobo, Argentina
- Height: 1.75 m (5 ft 9 in)
- Position: Midfielder

Team information
- Current team: Puerto Cabello

Youth career
- 2002–2006: Instituto de Córdoba

Senior career*
Years	Team	Apps	(Gls)
2007–2008	Instituto de Córdoba	?	(?)
2008–2009	General Paz Juniors	?	(?)
2009–2011	Instituto de Córdoba	10	(0)
2011–2013	Alumni	?	(?)
2013–2015	Universitario de Sucre	52	(4)
2015	Metropolitanos	13	(1)
2016–2017	Universitario de Sucre	49	(4)
2017–2018	Carabobo	43	(1)
2019–	Puerto Cabello	11	(1)
- * Club domestic league appearances and goals as of 14 April 2019

Federico Silvestre (born October 6, 1987, in Carrilobo) is an Argentine football midfielder. Currently playing for Puerto Cabello.
