= Jonathan Bilbao =

Venezuelan-Peruvian footballer (born 1999)

Personal information
- Full name: Jonathan Alberto Bilbao Vásquez
- Date of birth: 29 July 1999 (age 27)
- Place of birth: Barquisimeto, Venezuela
- Height: 1.83 m (6 ft 0 in)
- Position: Centre-back

Team information
- Current team: Carabobo

Youth career
- Deportivo Lara
- 2017–2019: Universidad San Martín

Senior career*
Years	Team	Apps	(Gls)
2019–2021	Universidad San Martín	9	(0)
2022	Alianza Atlético	18	(0)
2023–2024	Cusco	55	(1)
2025	Ayacucho	26	(2)
2026–	Carabobo	0	(0)

International career
2018–2019	Peru U20	3	(0)
- * Club domestic league appearances and goals as of 30 December 2025

Jonathan Alberto Bilbao Vásquez (born 29 July 1999) is a Venezuelan-Peruvian footballer who plays as a centre-back for Venezuelan Liga FUTVE side Carabobo.

== Club career ==
=== Universidad San Martín ===
Born in Barquisimeto, the capital of the state of Lara in Venezuela, Bilbao started playing football at Deportivo Lara. Bilbao had two preseasons with the first team and was about to sign a professional contract with the club, before he got injured and was out for six months.

At the end of 2017 and for the first time, Bilbao came to Peru for a trip with his sister and his Peruvian father to visit his grandmother. Bilbao was supposed to try himself out at different Peruvian clubs, but ended up only training at Universidad San Martín because it was the only club with trials before he was going to return to Venezuela on 15 January 2017. However, two days before returning to Venezuela, San Martín coach, José Espinoza, told him to stay and he did.

Bilbao started on San Martíns reserve team. On 31 March 2019, he got his official debut in the Peruvian Primera División against FBC Melgar. Bilbao was in the starting lineup and played the whole game. He played a total of three games in the 2019 season for San Martíns first team.

=== Alianza Atlético ===
On 27 November 2021 it was confirmed, that Bilbao would join Alianza Atlético for the 2022 season.

=== Cusco ===
In December 2022, ahead of the 2023, Bilbao signed with Cusco FC.

=== Ayacucho ===
Ahead of the 2025 season, Bilbao joined Ayacucho FC.

=== Carabobo ===
On 24 December 2025, Bilbao signed with Venezuelan Liga FUTVE side Carabobo.

== International career ==
Bilbao's mother is from Venezuela and his father is from Peru. After arriving to Peru in January 2017, 19-year old Bilbao received his Peruvian Nationality Title in March 2018 and could now officially play for the Peruvian national teams.

After making his debut for Peru national under-20 football team in November 2018, Bilbao became a part of the squad that was called up for the 2019 South American U-20 Championship.
