= Juan Mancín =

Venezuelan footballer (born 2000)

Personal information
- Full name: Juan Ernesto Mancín Salami
- Date of birth: 31 January 2000 (age 26)
- Place of birth: Caracas, Venezuela
- Height: 1.65 m (5 ft 5 in)
- Position: Right winger

Youth career
- Metropolitanos

Senior career*
Years	Team	Apps	(Gls)
2018–2021	Metropolitanos	54	(9)
2023	Metropolitanos	13	(1)
- * Club domestic league appearances and goals as of 16:59, 15 October 2023 (UTC)

Juan Ernesto Mancín Salami (born 31 January 2000) is a Venezuelan footballer who plays as a right winger.

== Club career ==
=== Metropolitanos ===
Mancín is a product of Metropolitanos. He got his official debut for Metropolitanos on 18 February 2018 in a Venezuelan Primera División game against Deportivo La Guaira. He ended his first season as a professional, with a total of 10 appearances in all tournaments.

Mancín scored his first professional goal on 24 August 2019 in a 3–0 victory against Zulia FC in the Venezuelan Primera División. He ended the 2019 season with six goals in 25 games.

In August 2020, Mancín signed a one-year contract extension until the end of 2021. After a 2021 season, where he scored five goals in 23 games, Metropolitanos announced on 10 January 2022 that Mancín wouldn't extend his contract and had left the club.

On 16 January 2023, the club confirmed that Mancín had signed for Metropolitanos again.
