= Juan Manuel Cuesta =

Colombian footballer (born 2002)

Personal information
- Full name: Juan Manuel Cuesta Baena
- Date of birth: 9 February 2002 (age 24)
- Place of birth: Medellín, Colombia
- Height: 1.76 m (5 ft 9 in)
- Position: Midfielder

Team information
- Current team: UCV
- Number: 7

Youth career
- Independiente Medellín

Senior career*
Years	Team	Apps	(Gls)
2019–2024	Independiente Medellín	46	(3)
2021	→ Internacional (loan)	4	(0)
2022	→ Aldosivi (loan)	17	(1)
2023	→ Arsenal Sarandí (loan)	8	(0)
2024	→ Envigado (loan)	25	(2)
2025–	UCV	40	(11)

International career
2019	Colombia U17	3	(1)
- * Club domestic league appearances and goals as of 10 March 2026

Juan Manuel Cuesta Baena (born 9 February 2002) is a Colombian footballer who currently plays as a midfielder for Venezuelan Primera División club UCV.

== Career statistics ==
=== Club ===
As of 5 May 2021.

Club	Season	League			Cup		Continental		Other		Total	
Club	Season	Division	Apps	Goals	Apps	Goals	Apps	Goals	Apps	Goals	Apps	Goals
Independiente Medellín	2019	Categoría Primera A	15	2	4 (Note: Appearances in the Copa Colombia)	0	—		—		19	2
Independiente Medellín	2020	Categoría Primera A	17	1	2	0	5 (Note: Appearances in the Copa Libertadores)	1	—		24	2
Independiente Medellín	2021	Categoría Primera A	2	0	0	0	—		—		2	0
Independiente Medellín	Total		34	3	6	0	5	1	—		45	4
Internacional (loan)	2021	Série A	4	0	0	0	0	0	—		4	0
Career total			38	3	6	0	5	1	0	0	49	4

== Honours ==
Independiente Medellín

- Copa Colombia: 2019, 2020
