= Christian Larotonda =

Venezuelan football player (born 1999)

Personal information
- Full name: Christian Adán Larotonda Adán
- Date of birth: 26 May 1999 (age 27)
- Place of birth: Caracas, Venezuela
- Height: 5 ft 9 in (1.76 m)
- Position: Midfielder

Team information
- Current team: Caracas

Youth career
- Metropolitanos

Senior career*
Years	Team	Apps	(Gls)
2017–2023	Metropolitanos	148	(4)
2024	Monagas	29	(1)
2025	Vinotinto Ecuador	27	(0)
2026-	Caracas	1	(0)

International career^{‡}
2020	Venezuela U23	3	(0)
2022–	Venezuela	1	(0)
- * Club domestic league appearances and goals as of 05:37, 5 June 2022 (UTC) ‡ National team caps and goals as of 05:37, 5 June 2022 (UTC)

Christian Adán Larotonda Adán (born 26 May 1999) is a Venezuelan professional footballer who plays as a midfielder for Caracas.

== Club career ==
Born in Caracas, Larotonda began his career with Metropolitanos, making his professional debut for the club on 29 January 2017 against Atlético Venezuela, coming on as an 86th-minute substitute in a 0–0 draw. He scored his first professional goal for the club on 8 March 2020 against Mineros de Guayana.

On 18 March 2021, Larotonda scored his first Copa Sudamericana goal in a 2–0 victory over Academia Puerto Cabello. His performance during the match lead to him being named as the Copa Sudamericana Best Player of the Week.

== International career ==
On 21 January 2020, Larotonda made his debut for the Venezuela under-23 side during the CONMEBOL Pre-Olympic Tournament against Chile, coming on as a substitute in a 1–0 defeat. In November 2020, Larotonda received his first call-up to the Venezuela seniors but had to withdraw from the side after contracting COVID-19.

== Career statistics ==
As of match played 10 December 2020

Appearances and goals by club, season and competition
Club	Season	League			Cup		Continental		Total	
Club	Season	Division	Apps	Goals	Apps	Goals	Apps	Goals	Apps	Goals
Metropolitanos	2017	Primera División	27	0	0	0	—		27	0
Metropolitanos	2018	Primera División	4	0	1	0	—		5	0
Metropolitanos	2019	Primera División	31	0	2	0	—		33	0
Metropolitanos	2020	Primera División	13	1	0	0	2	1	15	1
Metropolitanos	Total		75	1	3	0	3	1	81	2
Career total			75	1	3	0	3	1	81	2
