= Francisco Solé (footballer) =

Argentine footballer

Personal information
- Date of birth: 2 May 1997 (age 29)
- Place of birth: Buenos Aires, Argentina
- Height: 1.77 m (5 ft 9 1/2 in)
- Position: Midfielder

Team information
- Current team: UCV
- Number: 6

Youth career
- J.J. Batista
- 2010–2017: Argentinos Juniors

Senior career*
Years	Team	Apps	(Gls)
2017–2019	Argentinos Juniors	0	(0)
2017–2018	→ Brown de Adrogué (loan)	2	(0)
2019–2020	Sportivo Italiano	22	(1)
2020–2022	Barracas Central	4	(0)
2021	→ Flandria (loan)	23	(0)
2022	→ Defensores Belgrano (loan)	35	(0)
2023	Almagro	35	(1)
2024–	UCV	69	(3)

International career
2016	Argentina U20	1	(0)
- * Club domestic league appearances and goals as of 10 March 2026

Francisco Solé (born 2 May 1997) is an Argentine professional footballer who plays as a midfielder for UCV.

== Club career ==
Solé spent time at the youth club J.J. Batista. He joined Argentinos Juniors in 2010, turning down a move to San Lorenzo in the process. In August 2017, Solé completed a loan move to Brown of Primera B Nacional. He made his Brown and professional debut on 28 October in a defeat to Guillermo Brown, after appearing on the substitutes bench in an early October game versus Juventud Unida. In July 2019, Solé departed Argentinos Juniors to join Sportivo Italiano in Primera C Metropolitana. One goal in twenty-two appearances followed. In July 2020, Primera B Nacional's Barracas Central signed Solé.

== International career ==
Solé received an Argentina U20 call-up for the 2016 COTIF Tournament. He featured once, in a Group B win against Costa Rica.

== Career statistics ==
As of 21 April 2024.

Club statistics
Club	Division	League			Cup		Continental		Total	
Club	Division	Season	Apps	Goals	Apps	Goals	Apps	Goals	Apps	Goals
Brown de Adrogué	Primera B Nacional	2017-18	2	0	0	0	—		2	0
Sportivo Italiano	Primera C Metropolitana	2019-20	22	1	—		—		22	1
Barracas Central	Primera B Nacional	2020-21	2	0	—		—		2	0
Barracas Central	Primera B Nacional	2021	2	0	—		—		2	0
Barracas Central	Total		4	0	0	0	0	0	4	0
Flandria	Primera B Metropolitana	2021	23	0	—		—		23	0
Defensores de Belgrano	Primera B Nacional	2022	35	0	—		—		35	0
Almagro	Primera B Nacional	2023	32	1	3	0	—		35	1
UCV	Primera División	2024	13	1	0	0	—		13	1
Career total			131	3	3	0	0	0	134	3
