= Carlos Ramos (footballer, born 1999) =

Venezuelan footballer (born 1999)

Personal information
- Full name: Carlos Ignacio Ramos Rodríguez
- Date of birth: 26 May 1999 (age 27)
- Place of birth: Valencia, Carabobo, Venezuela
- Height: 1.78 m (5 ft 10 in)
- Position: Midfielder

Team information
- Current team: Deportivo Garcilaso (on loan from Carabobo)

Senior career*
Years	Team	Apps	(Gls)
2016–2021	Carabobo	65	(4)
2021–2022	Deportivo Táchira	27	(1)
2022	Deportivo Lara	19	(1)
2023	Metropolitanos	4	(0)
2023	Zamora	7	(0)
2023–2024	Ilioupoli	22	(0)
2025–	Carabobo	33	(3)
2026–	→ Deportivo Garcilaso (loan)	2	(0)

International career^{‡}
2019	Venezuela U20	3	(0)
- * Club domestic league appearances and goals as of 18:29, 23 August 2022 (UTC) ‡ National team caps and goals as of 18:29, 23 August 2022 (UTC)

Carlos Ignacio Ramos Rodríguez (born 26 May 1999) is a Venezuelan professional footballer who plays as a midfielder for Deportivo Garcilaso, on loan from Carabobo.

== Career statistics ==
=== Club ===
As of 30 January 2019.

Club	Season	League			Cup		Continental		Other		Total	
Club	Season	Division	Apps	Goals	Apps	Goals	Apps	Goals	Apps	Goals	Apps	Goals
Carabobo	2016	Venezuelan Primera División	3	0	0	0	–		0	0	3	0
Carabobo	2017	Venezuelan Primera División	7	0	3 (Note: Appearances in the Copa Venezuela)	0	–		0	0	10	0
Carabobo	2018	Venezuelan Primera División	6	0	1	0	1 (Note: Appearances in the Copa Libertadores)	0	0	0	8	0
Career total			16	0	4	0	1	0	0	0	21	0
