= Carlos Calzadilla =

Venezuelan footballer (born 2001)

Personal information
- Full name: Carlos Daniel Calzadilla Durán
- Date of birth: 14 November 2001 (age 24)
- Place of birth: San Cristóbal, Venezuela
- Height: 1.80 m (5 ft 11 in)
- Position: Winger

Team information
- Current team: Deportivo Táchira
- Number: 20

Youth career
- Deportivo Táchira

Senior career*
Years	Team	Apps	(Gls)
2019–	Deportivo Táchira	73	(3)
- * Club domestic league appearances and goals as of 15:02, 15 March 2025 (UTC)

Carlos Daniel Calzadilla Durán (born 14 November 2001) is a Venezuelan footballer who plays as a winger for Venezuelan Primera División side Deportivo Táchira.

== Career ==
=== Club career ===
Calzadilla is a product of Deportivo Táchira. He got his official and professional debut for Deportivo Táchira on 8 February 2020 against Aragua F.C. in the Venezuelan Primera División. Calzadilla made five league appearances in his debut season.
