= Mauricio Márquez =

Venezuelan footballer (born 2001)

Personal information
- Full name: Mauricio Isaac Márquez Centeno
- Date of birth: 20 March 2001 (age 25)
- Place of birth: Barinas, Venezuela
- Height: 1.78 m (5 ft 10 in)
- Position: Forward

Team information
- Current team: Caracas

Youth career
- Próceres
- Zamora

Senior career*
Years	Team	Apps	(Gls)
2019–2025	Zamora	119	(25)
2025–	Caracas	1	(1)
- * Club domestic league appearances and goals as of 3 March 2020

Mauricio Márquez (born 20 March 2001) is a Venezuelan professional footballer who plays as a forward for Caracas.
