= Alberto Adriani Municipality =

Alberto Adriani Municipality Municipio Alberto Adriani
- Municipality
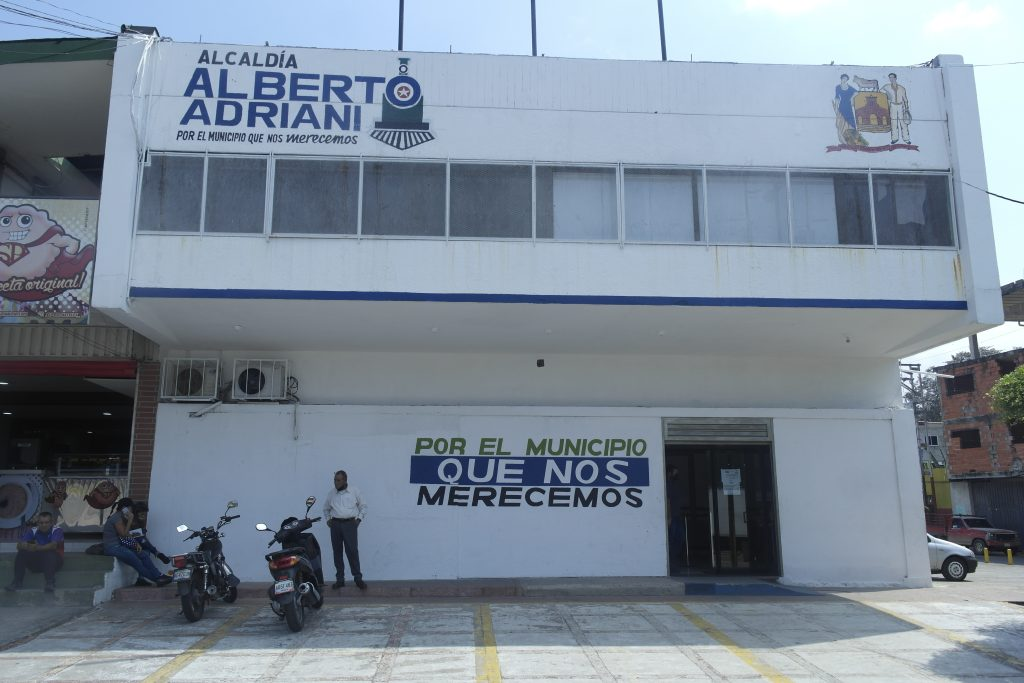

- Flag Coat of arms

- Location in Mérida

- Location in Venezuela
- Coordinates: 8°36′N 71°40′W
- Country: Venezuela
- State: Mérida

Government
  - Mayor: Lisandro Ramirez Segura (AD) (MUD)

Area
  - Total: 683 km^{2} (264 sq mi)

Population (2011)
  - Total: 250,257
  - Density: 366/km^{2} (949/sq mi)
- Time zone: UTC−4 (VET)
- Area code(s): 0275
- Website: Official website

The Alberto Adriani Municipality (Spanish pronunciation: [alˈβeɾto aˈðɾjani]) is one of the 23 municipalities (municipios) that makes up the Venezuelan state of Mérida and, according to a 2007 population estimate by the National Institute of Statistics of Venezuela, the municipality has a population of 162,637 as of 2023.

== Climate ==
El Vigia experiences a tropical rainforest climate (Köppen: Af) characterized by consistently hot temperatures and abundant rainfall throughout the year. The total annual precipitation is 2089.5 millimeters (82.27 inches). El Vigia experiences precipitation peaks from April to May and October to November.

Climate data for El Vigia (1991–2020)
Month	Jan	Feb	Mar	Apr	May	Jun	Jul	Aug	Sep	Oct	Nov	Dec	Year
Record high °C (°F)	37.3 (99.1)	38.0 (100.4)	38.0 (100.4)	38.8 (101.8)	37.7 (99.9)	37.7 (99.9)	37.3 (99.1)	39.2 (102.6)	39.0 (102.2)	39.2 (102.6)	36.9 (98.4)	36.0 (96.8)	39.2 (102.6)
Mean daily maximum °C (°F)	32.6 (90.7)	32.9 (91.2)	33.2 (91.8)	33.3 (91.9)	33.6 (92.5)	33.4 (92.1)	33.7 (92.7)	34.4 (93.9)	34.4 (93.9)	33.5 (92.3)	32.7 (90.9)	32.3 (90.1)	33.3 (91.9)
Daily mean °C (°F)	26.1 (79.0)	26.6 (79.9)	27.1 (80.8)	27.3 (81.1)	27.6 (81.7)	27.3 (81.1)	27.2 (81.0)	27.6 (81.7)	27.5 (81.5)	27.2 (81.0)	26.6 (79.9)	26.2 (79.2)	27.0 (80.6)
Mean daily minimum °C (°F)	21.8 (71.2)	22.1 (71.8)	22.9 (73.2)	23.3 (73.9)	23.7 (74.7)	23.1 (73.6)	22.9 (73.2)	23.1 (73.6)	23.1 (73.6)	23.0 (73.4)	22.8 (73.0)	22.4 (72.3)	22.9 (73.2)
Record low °C (°F)	17.1 (62.8)	15.9 (60.6)	18.8 (65.8)	18.8 (65.8)	20.1 (68.2)	18.8 (65.8)	18.9 (66.0)	18.1 (64.6)	19.6 (67.3)	18.1 (64.6)	11.3 (52.3)	17.1 (62.8)	11.3 (52.3)
Average precipitation mm (inches)	97.8 (3.85)	101.9 (4.01)	151.4 (5.96)	244.3 (9.62)	210.1 (8.27)	169.7 (6.68)	159.2 (6.27)	164.6 (6.48)	162.4 (6.39)	254.2 (10.01)	221.9 (8.74)	152.0 (5.98)	2,089.5 (82.26)
Average precipitation days (≥ 1.0 mm)	8.1	7.5	10.3	14.3	14.3	13.3	13.3	12.2	13.0	14.7	13.9	10.4	145.3
Source: NOAA

== Demographics ==
The Alberto Adriani Municipality has a population of 162,637 (2023) (up from 128,222 in 2007). The municipality's population density is 238.1/km².

== Government ==
The mayor of the Alberto Adriani Municipality is Lisandro Garcia The municipality is divided into seven parishes; Presidente Betancourt, Presidente Páez, Presidente Rómulo Gallegos, Gabriel Picón González, Héctor Amable Mora, José Nucete Sardi, and Pulido Méndez.

== Transportation ==
Juan Pablo Pérez Alfonzo Airport serves the town, with six commercial airlines flying to it.

== See also ==
- Mérida
- Municipalities of Venezuela
