= Estadio Alexander Botinni =

- Interactive map of Estadio Alexander Botinni
- Location: Maturín, Venezuela
- Coordinates: 9°44′52.4″N 63°9′50.8″W
- Owner: INDEM
- Capacity: 8,000
- Surface: grass

Construction
- Opened: August 14, 1983
- Cost: Bs 2,000,000,000

Tenant
- Monagas Sport Club

Estadio Alexander Botinni is a multi-use stadium in Maturín, Venezuela. It is currently used mostly for football matches and is the home stadium of Monagas Sport Club. The stadium holds 8,000 people.
