= Yackson Rivas =

Venezuelan footballer (born 2002)

Personal information
- Full name: Yackson Stiven Rivas
- Date of birth: 18 March 2002 (age 24)
- Height: 1.78 m (5 ft 10 in)
- Position: Forward

Team information
- Current team: Kryvbas Kryvyi Rih (on loan from Deportivo La Guaira)
- Number: 7

Senior career*
Years	Team	Apps	(Gls)
2019–2020	Mineros de Guayana	10	(0)
2021–	Deportivo La Guaira	98	(15)
2024	→ Zamora (loan)	25	(3)
2026–	→ Kryvbas Kryvyi Rih (loan)	3	(1)
- * Club domestic league appearances and goals as of 7 September 2026

Yackson Stiven Rivas (born 18 March 2002) is a Venezuelan footballer who plays as a forward for Kryvbas Kryvyi Rih on loan from Deportivo La Guaira.

== Career statistics ==
=== Club ===
As of 21 January 2020.

Club	Season	League			Cup		Continental		Other		Total	
Club	Season	Division	Apps	Goals	Apps	Goals	Apps	Goals	Apps	Goals	Apps	Goals
Mineros de Guayana	2019	Venezuelan Primera División	10	0	0	0	0	0	0	0	10	0
Career total			10	0	0	0	0	0	0	0	10	0
