= Angelo Lucena =

Venezuelan footballer (born 2003)

Personal information
- Full name: Angelo Yonnier Lucena Soteldo
- Date of birth: January 26, 2003 (age 23)
- Place of birth: Guanare, Venezuela
- Height: 1.68 m (5 ft 6 in)
- Position: Midfielder

Team information
- Current team: Carabobo FC
- Number: 11

Senior career*
Years	Team	Apps	(Gls)
2019–2022	Portuguesa	84	(6)
2022-2025	Metropolitanos	71	(9)
2025-	Carabobo	15	(4)

International career^{‡}
2019	Venezuela U16	1	(0)
- * Club domestic league appearances and goals as of 14:11, 6 December 2019 (UTC) ‡ National team caps and goals as of 14:11, 6 December 2019 (UTC)

Angelo Yonnier Lucena Soteldo (born 26 January 2003) is a Venezuelan footballer who plays as a midfielder for Carabobo Fútbol Club.

== Career statistics ==
=== Club ===
As of 6 December 2019.

Club	Season	League			Cup		Continental		Other		Total	
Club	Season	Division	Apps	Goals	Apps	Goals	Apps	Goals	Apps	Goals	Apps	Goals
Portuguesa	2019	Venezuelan Primera División	26	2	0	0	–		0	0	26	2
Career total			26	2	0	0	0	0	0	0	26	2
