= Jhon Marchán =

Venezuelan footballer (born 1998)

Personal information
- Full name: Jhon Lorens Marchán Cordero
- Date of birth: 2 September 1998 (age 28)
- Place of birth: Acarigua, Venezuela
- Height: 1.70 m (5 ft 7 in)
- Position: Right winger

Team information
- Current team: Academia Puerto Cabello

Youth career
- Portuguesa

Senior career*
Years	Team	Apps	(Gls)
2015–2020	Portuguesa	91	(11)
2020–2023	Sporting Cristal	38	(5)
2022–2023	→ UTC (loan)	21	(0)
2023—2024	Metropolitanos	34	(1)
2025	Portuguesa	28	(1)
2026-	Academia Puerto Cabello	2	(0)
- * Club domestic league appearances and goals as of 19:11, 6 October 2022 (UTC)

Jhon Lorens Marchán Cordero (born 2 September 1998) is a Venezuelan footballer who plays as a winger for Academia Puerto Cabello.

== Career statistics ==
=== Club ===
As of 11 January 2020.

Club	Season	League			Cup		Continental		Other		Total	
Club	Season	Division	Apps	Goals	Apps	Goals	Apps	Goals	Apps	Goals	Apps	Goals
Portuguesa	2015	Venezuelan Primera División	7	0	0	0	0	0	0	0	7	0
Portuguesa	2016	Venezuelan Primera División	6	0	0	0	0	0	0	0	6	0
Portuguesa	2017	Venezuelan Primera División	17	1	0	0	0	0	0	0	17	1
Portuguesa	2018	Venezuelan Primera División	24	3	0	0	0	0	0	0	24	3
Portuguesa	2019	Venezuelan Primera División	34	7	0	0	0	0	0	0	34	7
Career total			88	11	0	0	0	0	0	0	88	11
