= Copa Venezuela =

- Founded: 1932
- Region: Venezuela
- Teams: 40
- Related competitions: Liga FUTVE; Supercopa de Venezuela
- Current champions: Universidad Central (1st title)
- Most championships: Caracas (5 titles)
- 2026 Copa Venezuela

The Copa Venezuela (English: Venezuela Cup) is the national cup football competition of Venezuela. Organized by the Venezuelan Football Federation, it is contested in the second half of the season by the teams in the Primera División and Segunda División, excluding reserve teams competing in the lower tier.

Over the years, the competition has had several names. Under its current format, the competition was revived by the FVF in 2007. Its format is similar to the one used for the Spanish Copa del Rey. Until 2019, the champion qualified for the Copa Sudamericana.

== Champions ==
Ed.	Season	Champion	Runner-up
Copa Venezuela
1	1932	Unión	Deportivo Venezuela
2	1933	Dos Caminos	Deportivo Venezuela
3	1934	Unión	Dos Caminos
4	1935	Unión	Dos Caminos
5	1936	Unión	Deportivo Venezuela
6	1937	Litoral	Deportivo Venezuela
7	1938	Unión	Dos Caminos
–	1939	Not held	
8	1940	Unión	Litoral
9	1941	Litoral	Dos Caminos
10	1942	Loyola	Litoral
11	1943	Loyola	Dos Caminos
–	1944	Not held	
12	1945	Dos Caminos	Deportivo Venezuela
–	1946	Not held	
13	1947	La Salle	Unión
Copa IND
14	1953	Deportivo Vasco	Nuevo del Este
–	1954–1956	Not held	
Copa Liga Mayor
15	1959	Deportivo Portugués	Deportivo Español
Copa Naciones
16	1960	Banco Agrícola y Pecuario	Deportivo Portugués
Copa Caracas
17	1961	Deportivo Italia	Dos Caminos
18	1962	Deportivo Italia	Unión Deportiva Canarias
19	1963	Unión Deportiva Canarias	Tiquire Flores
20	1964	Tiquire Flores	Unión Deportiva Canarias
21	1965	Valencia	Lara
22	1966	Deportivo Galicia	Unión Deportiva Canarias
23	1967	Deportivo Galicia	Deportivo Portugués
Copa Venezuela
24	1968	Unión Deportiva Canarias	Lara
25	1969	Deportivo Galicia	Unión Deportiva Canarias
26	1970	Deportivo Italia	Deportivo Galicia
27	1971	Estudiantes de Mérida	Anzoátegui FC
28	1972	Deportivo Portugués	Valencia
29	1973	Portuguesa	Estudiantes de Mérida
–	1974	Not held	
30	1975	Estudiantes de Mérida	San Cristóbal
31	1976	Portuguesa	Deportivo Italia
32	1977	Portuguesa	Valencia
33	1978	Valencia	Universidad de Los Andes
34	1979	Deportivo Galicia	Lara
35	1980	Atlético Zamora	Valencia
36	1981	Deportivo Galicia	Deportivo Táchira
37	1982	Deportivo Táchira	Atlético Zamora
Copa Bicentenario
38	1983	Deportivo Táchira	Atlético Zamora
–	1984	Not held	
Copa Venezuela
39	1985	Mineros de Guayana	Deportivo Táchira
–	1986	Not held	
40	1987	Caracas	Mineros de Guayana
41	1988	Maritimo	Estudiantes de Mérida
42	1989	Maritimo	Mineros de Guayana
43	1990	Internacional	Portuguesa
44	1991	Anzoátegui FC	Caracas
45	1992	Trujillanos	Caracas
46	1993	Caracas	Minervén
47	1994	Caracas	Trujillanos
48	1995	Universidad de Los Andes	Caracas
–	1996–2006	Not held	
49	2007–08	Aragua	Unión Atlético Maracaibo
50	2008	Deportivo Anzoátegui	Estudiantes de Mérida
51	2009	Caracas	Trujillanos
52	2010	Trujillanos	Zamora
53	2011	Mineros de Guayana	Trujillanos
54	2012	Deportivo Anzoátegui	Estudiantes de Mérida
55	2013	Caracas	Deportivo Táchira
56	2014	Deportivo La Guaira	Trujillanos
57	2015	Deportivo La Guaira	Deportivo Lara
58	2016	Zulia	Estudiantes de Caracas
59	2017	Mineros de Guayana	Zamora
60	2018	Zulia	Aragua
61	2019	Zamora	Monagas
–	2020–2021	Canceled due to the COVID-19 pandemic	
–	2022–2023	Not held	
62	2024	Deportivo La Guaira	Metropolitanos
63	2025	Universidad Central	Carabobo
64	2026		

== Titles by club ==
Club	Titles	Runners-up	Seasons won	Seasons runner-up
Caracas	5	3	1987, 1993, 1994, 2009, 2013	1991, 1992, 1995
Deportivo Galicia	5	1	1966, 1967, 1969, 1979, 1981	1970
Mineros de Guayana	3	2	1985, 2011, 2017	1987, 1989
Deportivo Italia	3	1	1961, 1962, 1970	1976
Portuguesa	3	1	1973, 1976, 1977	1990
Deportivo La Guaira	3	—	2014, 2015, 2024	—
Deportivo Táchira	2	4	1982, 1983	1975, 1981, 1985, 2013
Estudiantes de Mérida	2	4	1971, 1975	1973, 1988, 2008, 2012
Trujillanos	2	4	1992, 2010	1994, 2009, 2011, 2014
Unión Deportiva Canarias	2	4	1963, 1968	1962, 1964, 1966, 1969
Valencia	2	3	1965, 1978	1972, 1977, 1980
Deportivo Portugués	2	2	1959, 1972	1960, 1967
Deportivo Anzoátegui	2	—	2008, 2012	—
Marítimo	2	—	1988, 1989	—
Zulia	2	—	2016, 2018	—
Atlético Zamora	1	2	1980	1982, 1983
Zamora	1	2	2019	2010, 2017
Aragua	1	1	2007–08	2018
Tiquire Flores	1	1	1964	1963
Universidad de Los Andes	1	1	1995	1978
Anzoátegui FC	1	1	1991	1971
Banco Agrícola y Pecuario	1	—	1960	—
Internacional	1	—	1990	—
Universidad Central	1	—	2025	—
Lara	—	3	—	1965, 1968, 1979
Carabobo	—	1	—	2025
Deportivo Español	—	1	—	1959
Deportivo Lara	—	1	—	2015
Dos Caminos	—	1	—	1961
Estudiantes de Caracas	—	1	—	2016
Metropolitanos	—	1	—	2024
Minervén	—	1	—	1993
Monagas	—	1	—	2019
Unión Atlético Maracaibo	—	1	—	2007–08
