= Bolívar S.C. =

Venezuelan football club

Bolívar
- Full name: Bolívar Sports Club
- Founded: 2021; 5 years ago
- Ground: Decanato UDO Bolívar
- Capacity: 1,500
- Manager: Edward Leonet
- League: Segunda División
- 2023: Segunda División, 2nd of 16
Home colours	Away colours

Bolívar Sports Club is a Venezuelan football team that is based in Ciudad Bolívar. Founded in 2021, they play in the Venezuelan Segunda División.

== History ==
Initially a proposal to rename LALA FC to Bolívar SC, which later did not materialize, Bolívar were founded in 2021. They started to play in the year's Segunda División, and announced former international footballer Luis Vera as their manager.

In the 2023 Segunda División, Bolívar reached the finals in both Apertura and Clausura tournament, losing the Apertura finals to Ureña but defeating Marítimo de La Guaira in the Clausura finals; in the tournament's finals, they lost to Ureña and missed out promotion.

== Managers ==
- (Venezuela) Luis Vera (2021)
- (Venezuela) Álvaro Valencia (2022)
- (Venezuela) Elvis Martínez (2022)
- (Venezuela) Edward Leonet (2023–)
