= Universidad Central de Venezuela F.C. =

Venezuelan football club

Universidad Central
- Full name: Universidad Central de Venezuela Fútbol Club
- Nicknames: Tricolor; Ucevistas
- Founded: 1950; 76 years ago
- Ground: Estadio Olímpico de la UCV; Caracas, Venezuela
- Capacity: 23,940
- Chairman: Alexander Arteaga
- Manager: Daniel Sasso
- League: Liga FUTVE
- 2025: Liga FUTVE, 4th of 14 (champions)
Home colours	Away colours

Universidad Central de Venezuela Fútbol Club (usually called Universidad Central or UCV FC) is a professional football club based in Caracas and playing in the Venezuelan Primera División. The club was founded in 1950 and has won two First Division titles in the professional era and other two in the amateur era.

== Players ==
=== First-team squad ===
As of 10 March 2026

Note: Flags indicate national team as defined under FIFA eligibility rules; some limited exceptions apply. Players may hold more than one non-FIFA nationality.

No.	Pos.	Nation	Player
1	GK	ARG	Lautaro Morales (on loan from CA Lanús)
2	DF	VEN	Kendrys Silva
3	DF	VEN	Rubén Ramírez
4	DF	VEN	Williams Velásquez
5	DF	VEN	Adrián Martínez
6	MF	ARG	Francisco Solé
7	MF	COL	Juan Manuel Cuesta
8	FW	COL	Juan Camilo Zapata
9	FW	VEN	Yeiber Murillo
10	FW	VEN	Samuel Sosa
11	FW	VEN	Jovanny Bolívar (on loan from Albacete)
12	GK	VEN	Carlos González
13	GK	VEN	Giancarlo Schiavone
14	MF	VEN	Kendry Mendoza
15	DF	VEN	Román Davis
16	FW	VEN	Daniel De Sousa

No.	Pos.	Nation	Player
17	MF	VEN	Vicente Rodríguez
18	FW	VEN	Roberto Sarli
19	DF	COL	Alfonso Simarra
21	FW	VEN	Charlis Ortiz (captain)
22	GK	VEN	Diego Ochoa
23	DF	VEN	Yanniel Hernández
24	MF	VEN	Yohan Cumana
27	DF	VEN	Daniel Carrillo
28	MF	COL	Maicol Ruiz
30	MF	PAN	Alexander Gonzalez
31	MF	VEN	Jose Lopez
39	DF	VEN	Diego Rinaldi
47	FW	VEN	Alexander Granko
57	MF	VEN	Carlos Cermeño
-	MF	VEN	Williander Muñoz

=== Out on loan ===
Note: Flags indicate national team as defined under FIFA eligibility rules; some limited exceptions apply. Players may hold more than one non-FIFA nationality.

No.	Pos.	Nation	Player
25	MF	VEN	Jean Polo (at Atletico Ávila until 31 December 2026)
-	MF	VEN	Brayan Matamoros (at Atletico Ávila until 31 December 2026)

== Honours ==
=== National ===
- Primera División Venezolana
  - Winners (4): 1951, 1953, 1957, 2025
- Copa Venezuela
  - Winners (1): 2025
- Supercopa de Venezuela
  - Winners (1): 2026

== Coaches ==
- (Brazil) Orlando Fantoni (1957)
