= Olympic Stadium (Caracas) =

Sports venue in Caracas, Venezuela

Coordinates: 10°29′28.60″N 66°53′07.77″W

Estadio Olímpico de la UCV
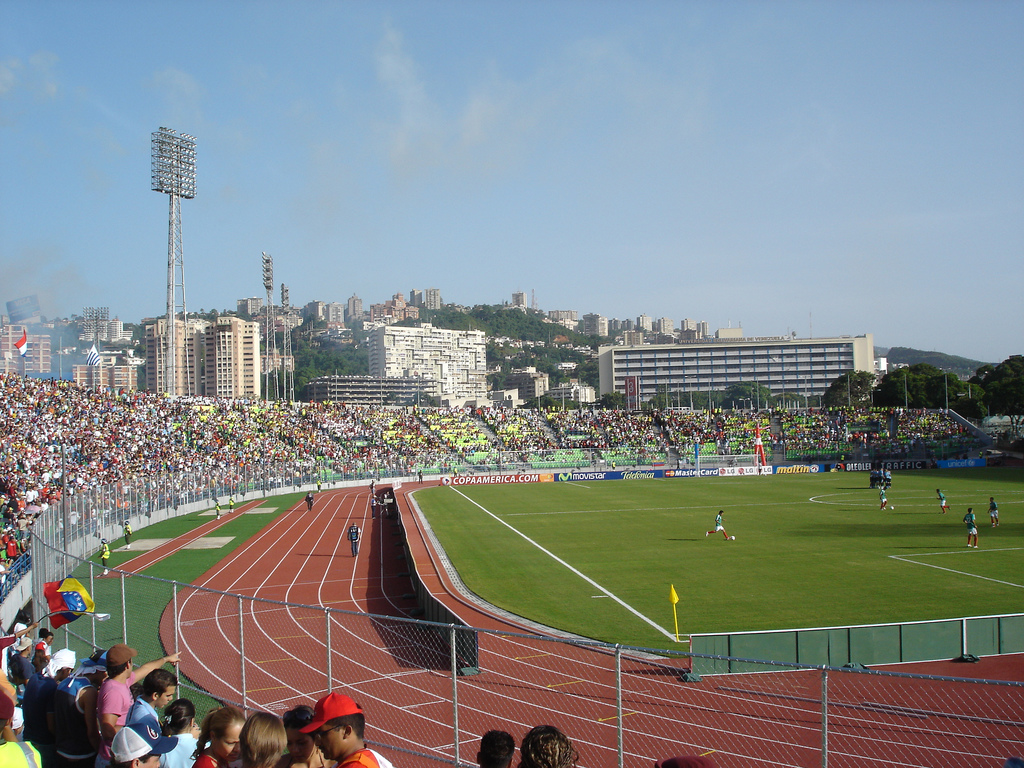
- Copa América 2007-Mexico vs Uruguay
- Interactive map of Estadio Olímpico de la UCV
- Full name: Estadio Olímpico de la Universidad Central de Venezuela
- Location: Caracas, Venezuela
- Owner: Universidad Central de Venezuela
- Capacity: 24,264

Construction
- Built: 1950–1951
- Opened: 5 December 1951
- Renovated: 2007
- Cost: US$16 million

Tenants
- Caracas F.C. Deportivo La Guaira; Metropolitanos; Universidad Central; Venezuela national football team

Estadio Olímpico de la UCV is a multipurpose stadium (football, athletics, rugby) used mainly for association football in Caracas, Venezuela, which serves the home ground of Caracas F.C., Deportivo La Guaira, Metropolitanos F.C., and Universidad Central. It has a capacity of 24,264.

== History ==
The stadium in 2018

The stadium was designed by Venezuelan architect Carlos Raúl Villanueva. It was opened in 1951 and renovated in 2007. It used to be the home ground of Unión S.C.

The stadium has hosted major events such as the Copa Libertadores, the 1983 Pan American Games and the South American qualifiers for the World Cup, as well as the former Copa Merconorte and matches of the Copa América.

There have been several important football teams that have played at this stadium, such as Inter Milan, A.C. Milan, Real Madrid, USSR, Argentina and Brazil.

The 1975 Copa América final between Peru and Colombia was also played in this stadium.

In 2009, Aerosmith was to be the first act playing at Estadio Olímpico. The concert was cancelled due to a knee infection to lead guitarist Joe Perry.

== Copa América matches ==
=== 1975 Copa América ===
The Olímpico was the venue for the 1975 Copa América play-off final:

Date	Team #1	Res.	Team #2	Round
28 October 1975	Peru	1-0	Colombia	Final (Play-off)

=== 2007 Copa América ===
The stadium was one of the venues for the 2007 Copa América. The following games were played at the stadium during said event:

Date	Time(EDT)	Team #1	Res.	Team #2	Round
14 July 2007	17.00	Uruguay	1-3	Mexico	3rd Place
