= 2017 Copa Venezuela =

Tournament details
- Country: Venezuela
- Dates: 26 April – 29 November
- Teams: 60

Final positions
- Champions: Mineros (3rd title)
- Runners-up: Zamora
- Copa Sudamericana: Mineros

Tournament statistics
- Top goal scorer(s): Charlis Ortiz (6 goals)

The 2017 Copa Venezuela was the 48th edition of the competition. It began with the first round on 26 April and finished with the second leg of the final on 29 November 2017. The winner qualified to the 2018 Copa Sudamericana.

Primera División side Zulia were the defending champions, but they were eliminated by Ureña in the quarter-finals.

Mineros won the title after defeating Zamora in the final, 5–4 on aggregate.

== First stage ==
- Teams entering this round: 21 teams from the Tercera División.
- The matches take place on 26 April, 3 and 10 May 2017.

=== Group 1 ===
| Pos | Team | Pld | W | D | L | GF | GA | GD | Pts | Qualification |
|---|---|---|---|---|---|---|---|---|---|---|
| 1 | Deportivo Nueva Esparta | 2 | 0 | 2 | 0 | 4 | 4 | 0 | 2 | Advance to second stage |
| 2 | Fundación UDC | 2 | 0 | 2 | 0 | 3 | 3 | 0 | 2 | |
| 2 | Ciudad Vinotinto | 2 | 0 | 2 | 0 | 3 | 3 | 0 | 2 | |

Source: Soccerway
Rules for classification: 1) Points; 2) Goal difference; 3) Goals scored.

| 26 April 2017 | Fundación UDC | 2–2 | Deportivo Nueva Esparta | Pampatar |
| 15:00 | Guerrero 77', 81' | Report | Sulaimand 32'; Ramos 50' | Stadium: Alfredo Díaz; Attendance: 400; Referee: Alejandro Velásquez (Nueva Esparta) |

| 3 May 2017 | Deportivo Nueva Esparta | 2–2 | Ciudad Vinotinto | Pampatar |
| 15:00 | | Report | | Stadium: Ciudad Deportiva |

| 10 May 2017 | Ciudad Vinotinto | 1–1 | Fundación UDC | Lechería |
| 15:00 | | Report | | Stadium: CD Ciudad Vinotinto |

=== Group 2 ===
| Pos | Team | Pld | W | D | L | GF | GA | GD | Pts | Qualification |
|---|---|---|---|---|---|---|---|---|---|---|
| 1 | Minasoro | 2 | 1 | 1 | 0 | 4 | 2 | +2 | 4 | Advance to second stage |
| 2 | Minervén | 2 | 1 | 1 | 0 | 3 | 2 | +1 | 4 | |
| 3 | La Mejía | 2 | 0 | 0 | 2 | 0 | 3 | −3 | 0 | |

Source: Soccerway
Rules for classification: 1) Points; 2) Goal difference; 3) Goals scored.

| 26 April 2017 | Minasoro | 2–2 | Minervén | El Callao |
| 17:00 | Palma 55'; Méndez 60' | Report | Mercedes 36'; Córdova 77' | Stadium: Héctor Thomas; Attendance: 1,700; Referee: Luis Cobeñas (Bolívar) |

| 3 May 2017 | Minervén | 1–0 | La Mejía | El Callao |
| 15:00 | | Report | | Stadium: Héctor Thomas |

| 10 May 2017 | La Mejía | 0–2 | Minasoro | Maturín |
| 15:00 | | Report | | Stadium: Alexander Botinni |

=== Group 3 ===
| Pos | Team | Pld | W | D | L | GF | GA | GD | Pts | Qualification |
|---|---|---|---|---|---|---|---|---|---|---|
| 1 | Hermandad Gallega | 2 | 2 | 0 | 0 | 5 | 2 | +3 | 6 | Advance to second stage |
| 2 | Pellícano | 2 | 1 | 0 | 1 | 4 | 4 | 0 | 3 | |
| 3 | Libertador | 2 | 0 | 0 | 2 | 3 | 6 | −3 | 0 | |

Source: Soccerway
Rules for classification: 1) Points; 2) Goal difference; 3) Goals scored.

| 26 April 2017 | Pellícano | 1–2 | Hermandad Gallega | Caracas |
| 13:00 | Ramos 48' | Report | Schiavone 63'; Barroso 73' | Stadium: Fray Luis; Attendance: 30; Referee: Tony Abreu (Vargas) |

| 3 May 2017 | Hermandad Gallega | 3–1 | Libertador | Valle Fresco |
| 15:00 | | Report | | Stadium: Valle Fresco |

| 10 May 2017 | Libertador | 2–3 | Pellícano | Caracas |
| | | Report | | Stadium: Fray Luis |

=== Group 4 ===
| Pos | Team | Pld | W | D | L | GF | GA | GD | Pts | Qualification |
|---|---|---|---|---|---|---|---|---|---|---|
| 1 | Pacairigua | 2 | 1 | 0 | 1 | 7 | 6 | +1 | 3 | Advance to second stage |
| 2 | Arroceros de Calabozo | 2 | 1 | 0 | 1 | 3 | 3 | 0 | 3 | |
| 3 | Ortiz | 2 | 1 | 0 | 1 | 6 | 7 | −1 | 3 | |

Source: Soccerway
Rules for classification: 1) Points; 2) Goal difference; 3) Goals scored.

| 26 April 2017 | Arroceros de Calabozo | 3–0 | Ortiz | Calabozo |
| 15:00 | Lo Bello 26', 61'; Osorio 90' | Report | | Stadium: Alfredo Simonpietri; Attendance: 54; Referee: Carlos Sáez (Guárico) |

| 3 May 2017 | Ortiz | 6–4 | Pacairigua | Calabozo |
| 15:30 | | Report | | Stadium: Alfredo Simonpietri |

| 10 May 2017 | Pacairigua | 3–0; Forfeit | Arroceros de Calabozo | Guatire |
| | | Report |

=== Group 5 ===
| Pos | Team | Pld | W | D | L | GF | GA | GD | Pts | Qualification |
|---|---|---|---|---|---|---|---|---|---|---|
| 1 | Talentos del Sur | 2 | 1 | 1 | 0 | 4 | 2 | +2 | 4 | Advance to second stage |
| 2 | Unión Deportiva Lara | 2 | 1 | 1 | 0 | 3 | 2 | +1 | 4 | |
| 3 | Madeira Club Lara | 2 | 0 | 0 | 2 | 2 | 5 | −3 | 0 | |

Source: Soccerway
Rules for classification: 1) Points; 2) Goal difference; 3) Goals scored.

| 26 April 2017 | Unión Deportiva Lara | 2–1 | Madeira Club Lara | Barquisimeto |
| 15:30 | Figueroa 45'; Mendoza 75' | Report | ? 46' (o.g.) | Stadium: Farid Richa; Attendance: 54; Referee: Elvis Caldera (Lara) |

| 10 May 2017 | Talentos del Sur | 1–1 | Unión Deportiva Lara | San Francisco |
| 15:00 | | Report | | Stadium: Villa Bolivariana |

| 17 May 2017 | Madeira Club Lara | 1–3 | Talentos del Sur | Cabudare |
| | | Report | | Stadium: Centro Atlético Madeira |

=== Group 6 ===
| Pos | Team | Pld | W | D | L | GF | GA | GD | Pts | Qualification |
|---|---|---|---|---|---|---|---|---|---|---|
| 1 | Internacional Turén | 2 | 1 | 1 | 0 | 5 | 4 | +1 | 4 | Advance to second stage |
| 2 | Ilusión Naranja | 2 | 0 | 1 | 1 | 4 | 5 | −1 | 1 | |
| – | Policía de Lara | 0 | 0 | 0 | 0 | 0 | 0 | 0 | 0 | Withdrew |

Source: Soccerway
Rules for classification: 1) Points; 2) Goal difference; 3) Goals scored.

| 3 May 2017 | Internacional Turén | 2–2 | Ilusión Naranja | Turén |
| 15:00 | | Report | | Stadium: Víctor Ramos |

| 10 May 2017 | Ilusión Naranja | 2–3 (4–5 agg.) | Internacional Turén | Barinas |
| 15:00 | | Report | | Stadium: Reinaldo Melo |

=== Group 7 ===
| Pos | Team | Pld | W | D | L | GF | GA | GD | Pts | Qualification |
|---|---|---|---|---|---|---|---|---|---|---|
| 1 | Independiente La Fría | 2 | 1 | 1 | 0 | 4 | 1 | +3 | 4 | Advance to second stage |
| 2 | Atlético Mérida | 2 | 1 | 0 | 1 | 3 | 3 | 0 | 3 | |
| 3 | Policía del Táchira | 2 | 0 | 1 | 1 | 1 | 4 | −3 | 1 | |

Source: Soccerway
Rules for classification: 1) Points; 2) Goal difference; 3) Goals scored.

| 26 April 2017 | Policía del Táchira | 1–1 | Independiente La Fría | Táriba |
| 19:30 | Ceballos 26' | Report | Martínez 28'; Jesús Hernández (yellow card) 75' (yellow-red card) | Stadium: 12 de Febrero; Attendance: 150; Referee: Reinaldo Morales (Táchira) |

| 3 May 2017 | Independiente La Fría | 3–0 | Atlético Mérida | La Fría |
| 15:00 | | Report | | Stadium: Polideportivo Humberto Laurano |

| 10 May 2017 | Atlético Mérida | 3–0; Forfeit | Policía del Táchira | Mérida |
| | | Report | | Stadium: Universidad de Los Andes |

== Second stage ==
- Teams entering this round: 21 teams from the Segunda División.
- The first legs will be played on 24 and the second legs will be played on 28 May 2017.

| Team 1 | Agg. | Team 2 | 1st leg | 2nd leg |
|---|---|---|---|---|
| Deportivo Nueva Esparta | 3–3 (2–4 p) | Margarita | 1–2 | 1–2 |
| Minasoro | 5–2 | Angostura | 3–0 | 2–2 |
| Hermandad Gallega | 5–9 | Petroleros | 4–5 | 1–4 |
| Pacairigua | 3–3 (a) | Tucanes | 1–0 | 2–3 |
| LALA | 4–2 | Chicó de Guayana | 2–1 | 2–1 |
| Petare | 4–2 | Universidad Central | 2–1 | 2–1 |
| Gran Valencia | 4–5 | Estudiantes de Caracas | 2–4 | 2–1 |
| Talentos del Sur | 3–5 | Llaneros | 0–0 | 3–5 |
| Internacional Turén | 5–8 | Atlético Guanare | 1–4 | 4–4 |
| Independiente La Fría | 2–3 | Titanes | 2–1 | 0–2 |
| Unión Atlético Falcón | 5–0 | Academia Puerto Cabello | 4–0 | 1–0 |
| El Vigía | 3–5 | ULA | 3–3 | 0–2 |
| Yaracuy | 1–4 | Yaracuyanos | 0–2 | 1–2 |
| Ureña | 3–2 | Real Frontera | 2–0 | 1–2 |

=== First leg ===
| 23 May 2017 | Gran Valencia | 2–4 | Estudiantes de Caracas | Valencia |
| 15:00 | Francisco Rivero 29', 73' | | Vielma 40'; Cabrera 55'; J. Fuentes 78'; Oberto 88' | Stadium: Misael Delgado |

| 24 May 2017 | Deportivo Nueva Esparta | 1–2 | Margarita | Pampatar |
| 15:00 | Vincent 12' | | Grijalba 73'; Aguilera 75' | Stadium: Ciudad Deportiva |

| 24 May 2017 | Minasoro | 3–0; Forfeit | Angostura | El Callao |
| 15:00 | | | | Stadium: Héctor Thomas |

| 24 May 2017 | Hermandad Gallega | 4–5 | Petroleros | Valle Fresco |
| 15:00 | Barroso 51', 82' (pen.), 90+2'; Alvarenga 64' (pen.) | | Ruiz 17'; Pedroza 20'; Benítez 43', 84'; Velásquez 60' | Stadium: Valle Fresco |

| 24 May 2017 | Pacairigua | 1–0 | Tucanes | Guatire |
| 15:00 | De Andrade 82' | | | Stadium: Complejo Deportivo Guido Blanco |

| 24 May 2017 | LALA | 2–1 | Chicó de Guayana | Ciudad Guayana |
| 15:00 | Guerra 29', 90+1' | | Requena 44' | Stadium: Polideportivo Cachamay |

| 24 May 2017 | Petare | 2–1 | Universidad Central | Caracas |
| 13:00 | Contreras 45+1'; Colina 84' | | Castellanos 31' (pen.) | Stadium: Fray Luis |

| 24 May 2017 | Talentos del Sur | 0–0 | Llaneros | San Francisco |
| 15:00 | | | | Stadium: Villa Bolivariana |

| 24 May 2017 | Internacional Turén | 1–4 | Atlético Guanare | Turén |
| 15:00 | León 69' | | Durán 51', 90+3'; Cedeño 53'; Rodríguez 61' | Stadium: Víctor Ramos |

| 24 May 2017 | Independiente La Fría | 2–1 | Titanes | La Fría |
| 15:30 | Cardozo 32', 49' | | Paz 36' | Stadium: Polideportivo Humberto Laurano |

| 24 May 2017 | Unión Atlético Falcón | 4–0 | Academia Puerto Cabello | Punto Fijo |
| 15:00 | Landys 5'; Maldonado 45'; Piña 49'; Juan Pirela 60' | | | Stadium: Pedro Conde |

| 24 May 2017 | El Vigía | 3–3 | ULA | El Vigía |
| 15:30 | Mejía 28'; Leandro Vargas 62'; Araque 86' | | Márquez 12'; Zarur 54', 64' | Stadium: Ramón "El Gato" Hernández |

| 24 May 2017 | Yaracuy | 0–2 | Yaracuyanos | San Felipe |
| 15:30 | | | Becerra 22'; Ortega 56' | Stadium: Florentino Oropeza |

| 24 May 2017 | Ureña | 2–0 | Real Frontera | Ureña |
| 15:30 | Parra 22'; Chacón 90' | | | Stadium: Alfonso Rojas |

=== Second leg ===
| 28 May 2017 | Margarita | 1–2 (3–3 agg.) (4–2 p) | Deportivo Nueva Esparta | Pampatar |
| 15:30 | Mina 62' | | Salazar 62', 90+3' | Stadium: Ciudad Deportiva |

| 28 May 2017 | Angostura | 2–2 (2–5 agg.) | Minasoro | Ciudad Bolívar |
| | | | | Stadium: Ricardo Tulio Maya |

| 28 May 2017 | Petroleros | 4–1 (9–5 agg.) | Hermandad Gallega | Puerto La Cruz |
| 15:30 | Cermeño 16', 85'; Velásquez 25'; Díaz 63' | | Espino 21' | Stadium: José Antonio Anzoátegui |

| 28 May 2017 | Tucanes | 3–2 (3–3 agg.) | Pacairigua (a) | Puerto Ayacucho |
| 15:00 | Velásquez 29', 75'; Saliyas 37' | | Galíndez 31'; Prado 53' | Stadium: Antonio José de Sucre |

| 28 May 2017 | Chicó de Guayana | 1–2 (2–4 agg.) | LALA | Ciudad Guayana |
| 15:00 | Aranda 84' (pen.) | | Aellos 31'; Golindano 36' | Stadium: Polideportivo El Gallo |

| 28 May 2017 | Universidad Central | 1–2 (2–4 agg.) | Petare | Caracas |
| 16:00 | R. Rivas 86' | | Cabezas 5'; Díaz 70' | Stadium: Estadio Olímpico |

| 28 May 2017 | Estudiantes de Caracas | 1–2 (5–4 agg.) | Gran Valencia | Caracas |
| 15:00 | Alonso 47' | | Alcalá 20', 60' | Stadium: Brígido Iriarte |

| 28 May 2017 | Llaneros | 5–3 (5–3 agg.) | Talentos del Sur | Guanare |
| 15:30 | | | | Stadium: Rafael Calles Pinto |

| 28 May 2017 | Titanes | 2–0 (3–2 agg.) | Independiente La Fría | Maracaibo |
| 15:00 | González 82'; Ojeda 88' | | | Stadium: La Rotaria |

| 28 May 2017 | Academia Puerto Cabello | 0–1 (0–5 agg.) | Unión Atlético Falcón | Vistamar |
| 15:30 | | | Juan Pirela 90+2' | Stadium: Puerto Cabello-Te Quiero |

| 28 May 2017 | ULA | 2–0 (5–3 agg.) | El Vigía | Mérida |
| 15:30 | Fasciana 19'; Uzcátegui 74' | | | Stadium: Universidad de Los Andes |

| 28 May 2017 | Yaracuyanos | 2–1 (4–1 agg.) | Yaracuy | San Felipe |
| 15:30 | Becerra 65'; Ortega 83' | | Herrera 77' | Stadium: Florentino Oropeza |

| 28 May 2017 | Real Frontera | 2–1 (2–3 agg.) | Ureña | San Antonio del Táchira |
| 16:00 | Presilla 73' (pen.); P. Rivas 76' | | Mosquera 13' | Stadium: Pedro Chávez |

| 29 May 2017 | Atlético Guanare | 4–4 (8–5 agg.) | Internacional Turén | Guanare |
| 19:00 | | | | Stadium: Rafael Calles Pinto |

== Third stage ==
- Teams entering this round: 18 teams from the Primera División.

| Team 1 | Agg. | Team 2 | 1st leg | 2nd leg |
|---|---|---|---|---|
| Margarita | 3–1 | Deportivo Anzoátegui | 2–0 | 1–1 |
| Minasoro | 2–10 | Mineros | 2–5 | 0–5 |
| LALA | 0–5 | Monagas | 0–1 | 0–4 |
| Petroleros | 3–3 (a) | Caracas | 2–2 | 1–1 |
| Pacairigua | 0–4 | Atlético Venezuela | 0–2 | 0–2 |
| Petare | 1–4 | Deportivo La Guaira | 0–1 | 1–3 |
| Estudiantes de Caracas | 2–0 | Metropolitanos | 0–0 | 2–0 |
| Yaracuyanos | 1–4 | Aragua | 0–2 | 1–2 |
| Titanes | 2–4 | Zulia | 0–1 | 2–3 |
| ULA | 2–2 (a) | Estudiantes de Mérida | 1–2 | 1–0 |
| Deportivo JBL | 0–1 | Trujillanos | 0–0 | 0–1 |
| Ureña | 2–2 (a) | Deportivo Táchira | 1–0 | 1–2 |
| Unión Atlético Falcón | 0–3 | Carabobo | 0–0 | 0–3 |
| Llaneros | 3–3 (a) | Portuguesa | 1–1 | 2–2 |
| Atlético Guanare | 1–7 | Deportivo Lara | 1–2 | 0–5 |
| Atlético Socopó | 1–2 | Zamora | 1–1 | 0–1 |

=== First leg ===
| 8 August 2017 | Titanes | 0–1 | Zulia | Maracaibo |
| 15:00 | | | Orozco 73' | Stadium: José Pachencho Romero |

| 9 August 2017 | Estudiantes de Caracas | 0–0 | Metropolitanos | Caracas |
| 13:00 | | | | Stadium: Brígido Iriarte |

| 9 August 2017 | LALA | 0–1 | Monagas | Ciudad Guayana |
| 15:00 | | | Guerra 70' | Stadium: Polideportivo Cachamay |

| 9 August 2017 | Petroleros | 2–2 | Caracas | Puerto La Cruz |
| 15:00 | Peñaranda 14'; Valecillo 77' | | Arace 65'; R. Chacón 68' | Stadium: José Antonio Anzoátegui |

| 9 August 2017 | Deportivo JBL | 0–0 | Trujillanos | Maracaibo |
| 15:00 | | | | Stadium: José Pachencho Romero |

| 9 August 2017 | Atlético Socopó | 1–1 | Zamora | Socopó |
| 15:00 | Gelis 29' | | I. González 46' (pen.) | Stadium: Rogelio Matos |

| 9 August 2017 | Margarita | 2–0 | Deportivo Anzoátegui | Pampatar |
| 15:30 | Sandoval 38', 75' | | | Stadium: Ciudad Deportiva |

| 9 August 2017 | Minasoro | 2–5 | Mineros | El Callao |
| 15:30 | K. Romero 71', 78' | | P. Chacón 23'; W. Moreno 45'; Arrieche 45+2', 60'; Castillo 59' | Stadium: Héctor Thomas |

| 9 August 2017 | Yaracuyanos | 0–2 | Aragua | San Felipe |
| 15:30 | | | Y. González 59'; J. García 90' | Stadium: Florentino Oropeza |

| 9 August 2017 | ULA | 1–2 | Estudiantes de Mérida | Mérida |
| 15:30 | Zambrano 23' | | Jaramillo 22'; Barrios 90+3' | Stadium: Guillermo Soto Rosa |

| 9 August 2017 | Unión Atlético Falcón | 0–0 | Carabobo | Punto Fijo |
| 15:30 | | | | Stadium: Polideportivo Manaure |

| 9 August 2017 | Petare | 0–1 | Deportivo La Guaira | Caracas |
| 19:00 | | | Azócar 88' | Stadium: Estadio Olímpico |

| 9 August 2017 | Ureña | 1–0 | Deportivo Táchira | Ureña |
| 19:00 | Valera 90+5' | | | Stadium: Alfonso Rojas |

| 9 August 2017 | Llaneros | 1–1 | Portuguesa | Guanare |
| 19:00 | Rentería 24' | | Aubone 20' | Stadium: Rafael Calles Pinto |

| 10 August 2017 | Pacairigua | 0–2 | Atlético Venezuela | Caracas |
| 13:00 | | | J. Moreno 13'; Molina 58' | Stadium: Brígido Iriarte |

| 10 August 2017 | Atlético Guanare | 1–2 | Deportivo Lara | Guanare |
| 15:30 | Medrano 57' (pen.) | | L. Gómez 27'; J. M. Reyes 49' | Stadium: Rafael Calles Pinto |

=== Second leg ===
| 22 August 2017 | Deportivo La Guaira | 3–1 (4–1 agg.) | Petare | Caracas |
| 17:00 | Valoyes 11', 69'; Arteaga 62' | | D. Hernández 30' | Stadium: Estadio Olímpico |

| 23 August 2017 | Atlético Venezuela | 2–0 (4–0 agg.) | Pacairigua | Caracas |
| 10:00 | Alzamora 10'; Meza 70' | | | Stadium: Brígido Iriarte |

| 23 August 2017 | Deportivo Anzoátegui | 1–1 (1–3 agg.) | Margarita | Puerto La Cruz |
| 15:30 | Yendis 44' | | Cordero 73' | Stadium: José Antonio Anzoátegui |

| 23 August 2017 | Zulia | 3–2 (4–2 agg.) | Titanes | Maracaibo |
| 16:00 | Celis 45+2', 51'; Rivillo 59' | | Parra 70'; Paz 80' | Stadium: José Pachencho Romero |

| 23 August 2017 | Deportivo Lara | 5–0 (7–1 agg.) | Atlético Guanare | Cabudare |
| 16:00 | Valderrey 27'; Michelena 40'; F. Vargas 64'; J. González 65'; L. Gómez 72' | | | Stadium: Estadio Metropolitano |

| 23 August 2017 | Mineros | 5–0 (10–2 agg.) | Minasoro | Ciudad Guayana |
| 17:00 | Coro 13' (o.g.); Marrufo 40'; Arrieche 41'; N. Hernández 69'; R. Blanco 72' | | | Stadium: Polideportivo Cachamay |

| 23 August 2017 | Aragua | 2–1 (4–1 agg.) | Yaracuyanos | Maracay |
| 17:00 | Bonilla 36'; Y. González 55' | | A. Rodríguez 52' | Stadium: Hermanos Ghersi Páez |

| 23 August 2017 | Trujillanos | 1–0 (1–0 agg.) | Deportivo JBL | Valera |
| 17:00 | L. Blanco 38' | | | Stadium: José Alberto Pérez |

| 23 August 2017 | Monagas | 4–0 (5–0 agg.) | LALA | Maturín |
| 19:00 | Guerra 21'; Zárate 53'; Flores 62'; C. Martínez 81' | | | Stadium: Estadio Monumental |

| 23 August 2017 | Caracas (a) | 1–1 (3–3 agg.) | Petroleros | Caracas |
| 19:00 | E. Pernía 55' | | Peñaranda 8' | Stadium: Estadio Olímpico |

| 23 August 2017 | Metropolitanos | 0–2 (0–2 agg.) | Estudiantes de Caracas | Caracas |
| 19:00 | | | L. Ramírez 43'; E. Silva 90+2' | Stadium: Brígido Iriarte |

| 23 August 2017 | Estudiantes de Mérida (a) | 0–1 (2–2 agg.) | ULA | Mérida |
| 19:00 | | | Murillo 60' | Stadium: Estadio Metropolitano |

| 23 August 2017 | Deportivo Táchira | 2–1 (2–2 agg.) | Ureña (a) | San Cristóbal |
| 19:00 | Aquino 68'; D. Gómez 77' | | J. Ortiz 32' | Stadium: Polideportivo de Pueblo Nuevo |

| 23 August 2017 | Carabobo | 3–0 (3–0 agg.) | Unión Atlético Falcón | Valencia |
| 19:00 | Novoa 28'; Tobar 62'; R. Gutiérrez 85' | | | Stadium: Misael Delgado |

| 23 August 2017 | Zamora | 1–0 (2–1 agg.) | Atlético Socopó | Barinas |
| 19:30 | I. González 53' | | | Stadium: Agustín Tovar |

| 30 August 2017 | Portuguesa | 2–2 (3–3 agg.) | Llaneros (a) | Acarigua |
| 15:30 | E. García 60'; Aubone 82' | | L. García 13', 80' | Stadium: José Antonio Páez |

== Final stages ==
Round of 16
Zulia | 2 | 2 | 4
Trujillanos | 1 | 0 | 1
Estudiantes de Mérida | 1 | 1 | 2
Ureña | 1 | 3 | 4
Carabobo (p) | 1 | 0 | 1 (4)
Deportivo Lara | 0 | 1 | 1 (3)
Llaneros | 1 | 1 | 2
Zamora | 3 | 2 | 5
Mineros (a) | 1 | 3 | 4
Caracas | 2 | 2 | 4
Margarita | 0 | 3 | 3
Monagas | 0 | 2 | 2
Deportivo La Guaira | 1 | 0 | 1 (3)
Aragua (p) | 0 | 1 | 1 (5)
Atlético Venezuela | 2 | 0 | 2
Estudiantes de Caracas (a) | 2 | 0 | 2

Quarter-finals
Zulia | 1 | 0 | 1
Ureña | 1 | 2 | 3
Carabobo | 1 | 1 | 2
Zamora | 2 | 2 | 4
Mineros | 4 | 1 | 5
Margarita | 1 | 0 | 1
Aragua | 2 | 1 | 3
Estudiantes de Caracas (a) | 2 | 1 | 3

Semi-finals
Ureña | 1 | 0 | 1
Zamora | 1 | 1 | 2
Mineros | 2 | 2 | 4
Estudiantes de Caracas | 0 | 0 | 0

Final
Zamora | 1 | 3 | 4
Mineros | 1 | 4 | 5

=== Round of 16 ===
| Team 1 | Agg. | Team 2 | 1st leg | 2nd leg |
|---|---|---|---|---|
| Zulia | 4–1 | Trujillanos | 2–1 | 2–0 |
| Estudiantes de Mérida | 2–4 | Ureña | 1–1 | 1–3 |
| Carabobo | 1–1 (4–3 p) | Deportivo Lara | 1–0 | 0–1 |
| Llaneros | 2–5 | Zamora | 1–3 | 1–2 |
| Margarita | 3–2 | Monagas | 0–0 | 3–2 |
| Mineros | 4–4 (a) | Caracas | 1–2 | 3–2 |
| Atlético Venezuela | 2–2 (a) | Estudiantes de Caracas | 2–2 | 0–0 |
| Deportivo La Guaira | 1–1 (3–5 p) | Aragua | 1–0 | 0–1 |

==== First leg ====
| 6 September 2017 | Margarita | 0–0 | Monagas | Pampatar |
| 15:30 | | Report | | Stadium: Ciudad Deportiva; Attendance: 142; Referee: Anderson Tovar |

| 6 September 2017 | Zulia | 2–1 | Trujillanos | Maracaibo |
| 16:00 | Bastardo 86' (o.g.); C. Gómez 89' | Report | F. Sosa 36' | Stadium: José Pachencho Romero; Attendance: 1,638; Referee: Eduardo Mármol |

| 6 September 2017 | Estudiantes de Mérida | 1–1 | Ureña | Mérida |
| 19:00 | L. Rodríguez 90+1' | Report | Mosquera 17' | Stadium: Estadio Metropolitano; Attendance: 1,730; Referee: Marcos Suárez |

| 6 September 2017 | Carabobo | 1–0 | Deportivo Lara | Valencia |
| 19:00 | Silvestre 73' | Report | | Stadium: Misael Delgado; Attendance: 1,365; Referee: Ramón Ortega |

| 6 September 2017 | Llaneros | 1–3 | Zamora | Guanare |
| 19:00 | D. Rodríguez 20' (pen.) | Report | Rivero 73'; Uribe 80'; E. Sosa 87' | Stadium: Rafael Calles Pinto; Attendance: 720; Referee: José Luis Hoyo |

| 6 September 2017 | Mineros | 1–2 | Caracas | Ciudad Guayana |
| 19:00 | C. Ortiz 3' | Report | E. Pernía 30', 37' | Stadium: Polideportivo Cachamay; Attendance: 1,568; Referee: Francisco López |

| 6 September 2017 | Atlético Venezuela | 2–2 | Estudiantes de Caracas | Caracas |
| 19:00 | Molina 2'; Mirabal 36' | Report | Halley 67'; Y. Silva 82' (pen.) | Stadium: Brígido Iriarte; Attendance: 340; Referee: Alexis Herrera |

| 6 September 2017 | Deportivo La Guaira | 1–0 | Aragua | Caracas |
| 19:00 | Suanno 44' | Report | | Stadium: Estadio Olímpico; Attendance: 213; Referee: Leonardo Caripa |

==== Second leg ====
| 13 September 2017 | Deportivo Lara | 1–0 (1–1 agg.) (3–4 p) | Carabobo | Cabudare |
| 16:00 | L. Gómez 80' | Report | | Stadium: Estadio Metropolitano; Attendance: 1,457; Referee: Marlón Escalante |
| | Penalties |
| | L. Gómez (penalty missed); Sierra (penalty scored); J. González (penalty scored); J. M. Reyes (penalty scored); H. Pernía (penalty missed) | | (penalty scored) C. Suárez; (penalty scored) Bello; (penalty missed) M. Fernández; (penalty scored) Colina; (penalty scored) Novoa |

| 13 September 2017 | Trujillanos | 0–2 (1–4 agg.) | Zulia | Valera |
| 17:00 | | Report | Unrein 22'; M. Gómez 53' | Stadium: José Alberto Pérez; Attendance: 335; Referee: Leonardo Caripa |
Note: Match suspended after 53 minutes due to crowd disturbance.

| 13 September 2017 | Aragua | 1–0 (1–1 agg.) (5–3 p) | Deportivo La Guaira | Maracay |
| 17:00 | J. García 45' | Report | | Stadium: Hermanos Ghersi Páez; Attendance: 938; Referee: Marcos Suárez |
| | Penalties |
| | Lugo (penalty scored); Cabello (penalty scored); Y. González (penalty scored); Urpín (penalty scored); A. López (penalty scored) | | (penalty scored) Ibáñez; (penalty missed) Peraza; (penalty scored) C. González; (penalty scored) Centeno |

| 13 September 2017 | Ureña | 3–1 (4–2 agg.) | Estudiantes de Mérida | Ureña |
| 19:00 | L. Chacón 66', 82' (pen.); Caicedo 85' (pen.) | Report | Muriel 51' | Stadium: Alfonso Rojas; Attendance: 520; Referee: José Luis Hoyo |

| 13 September 2017 | Monagas | 2–3 (2–3 agg.) | Margarita | Maturín |
| 19:00 | V. Rodríguez 1'; Guerra 44' | Report | Mina 45+1', 47'; Cordero 90+5' | Stadium: Estadio Monumental; Attendance: 1,423; Referee: Luis Cobeñas |

| 13 September 2017 | Caracas | 2–3 (4–4 agg.) | Mineros (a) | Caracas |
| 19:00 | R. Chacón 11'; Aristeguieta 89' | Report | Hurtado 76'; Presentado 86', 90+5' (o.g.) | Stadium: Estadio Olímpico; Attendance: 2,293; Referee: Ángel Arteaga |

| 13 September 2017 | Estudiantes de Caracas (a) | 0–0 (2–2 agg.) | Atlético Venezuela | Caracas |
| 19:00 | | Report | | Stadium: Brígido Iriarte; Attendance: 761; Referee: Anderson Tovar |

| 13 September 2017 | Zamora | 2–1 (5–2 agg.) | Llaneros | Barinas |
| 19:30 | Trujillo 49'; D. García 57' | Report | Rentería 89' | Stadium: Agustín Tovar; Attendance: 597; Referee: Luis Salas |

=== Quarter-finals ===
| Team 1 | Agg. | Team 2 | 1st leg | 2nd leg |
|---|---|---|---|---|
| Zulia | 1–3 | Ureña | 1–1 | 0–2 |
| Carabobo | 2–4 | Zamora | 1–2 | 1–2 |
| Mineros | 5–1 | Margarita | 4–1 | 1–0 |
| Aragua | 3–3 (a) | Estudiantes de Caracas | 2–2 | 1–1 |

==== First leg ====
| 27 September 2017 | Zulia | 1–1 | Ureña | Maracaibo |
| 16:00 | Unrein 32' | Report | J. Ortiz 49' | Stadium: José Pachencho Romero; Attendance: 938; Referee: Elvis Monasterios |

| 27 September 2017 | Aragua | 2–2 | Estudiantes de Caracas | Maracay |
| 17:00 | Villegas 19'; Bonilla 68' | Report | Mendoza 9'; Oberto 75' | Stadium: Hermanos Ghersi Páez; Attendance: 1,774; Referee: Ángel Arteaga |

| 27 September 2017 | Carabobo | 1–2 | Zamora | Valencia |
| 19:00 | Tobar 90+1' | Report | D. García 52'; Rodas 76' (pen.) | Stadium: Misael Delgado; Attendance: 1,760; Referee: Juan Soto |

| 27 September 2017 | Mineros | 4–1 | Margarita | Ciudad Guayana |
| 19:00 | Arrieche 37', 59'; Perozo 45+1'; C. Ortiz 78' | Report | Mina 4' | Stadium: Polideportivo Cachamay; Attendance: 2,143; Referee: Orlando Bracamonte |

==== Second leg ====
| 11 October 2017 | Margarita | 0–1 (1–5 agg.) | Mineros | Pampatar |
| 15:30 | | Report | Castillo 45+1' | Stadium: Ciudad Deportiva; Attendance: 108; Referee: Darwin Cabeza |

| 11 October 2017 | Ureña | 2–0 (3–1 agg.) | Zulia | San Cristóbal |
| 16:00 | Caicedo 38', 63' | Report | | Stadium: Cancha de la UCAT; Attendance: 1,600; Referee: Freddy Briceño |

| 11 October 2017 | Estudiantes de Caracas (a) | 1–1 (3–3 agg.) | Aragua | Caracas |
| 19:00 | Fuentes 3' | Report | Cabello 56' | Stadium: Brígido Iriarte; Attendance: 1,067; Referee: Jesús Valenzuela |

| 11 October 2017 | Zamora | 2–1 (4–2 agg.) | Carabobo | Barinas |
| 19:30 | Uribe 14', 90+4' | Report | Bello 6' | Stadium: Agustín Tovar; Attendance: 1,901; Referee: Juan Cabeza |

=== Semi-finals ===
| Team 1 | Agg. | Team 2 | 1st leg | 2nd leg |
|---|---|---|---|---|
| Ureña | 1–2 | Zamora | 1–1 | 0–1 |
| Mineros | 4–0 | Estudiantes de Caracas | 2–0 | 2–0 |

==== First leg ====
| 25 October 2017 | Ureña | 1–1 | Zamora | San Cristóbal |
| 16:00 | Caicedo 87' (pen.) | Report | Ó. Hernández 57' | Stadium: Cancha de la UCAT; Attendance: 1,381; Referee: Alexis Herrera |

| 25 October 2017 | Mineros | 2–0 | Estudiantes de Caracas | Ciudad Guayana |
| 19:00 | C. Ortiz 55'; Hurtado 63' | Report | | Stadium: Polideportivo Cachamay; Attendance: 1,108; Referee: Eduardo Mármol |

==== Second leg ====
| 1 November 2017 | Estudiantes de Caracas | 0–2 (0–4 agg.) | Mineros | Caracas |
| 19:00 | | Report | Hurtado 56'; Escobar 81' | Stadium: Brígido Iriarte; Attendance: 720; Referee: José Luis Hoyo |

| 1 November 2017 | Zamora | 1–0 (2–1 agg.) | Ureña | Barinas |
| 19:30 | Falcón 86' | Report | | Stadium: Agustín Tovar; Attendance: 2,709; Referee: Orlando Bracamonte |

=== Final ===
8 November 2017
19:00

| Zamora | 1–1 | Mineros |
|---|---|---|
| Uribe 51' | Report | C. Ortiz 84' |

Estadio Agustín Tovar, Barinas
Attendance: 7,955
Referee: Freddy Briceño

| Zamora | Mineros |

| GK | 22 | (Venezuela) Joel Graterol |
| DF | 27 | (Venezuela) Kevin de la Hoz | | (substituted off) 55' |
| DF | 2 | (Venezuela) Javier Maldonado |
| DF | 23 | (Venezuela) Óscar Hernández | (yellow card) 66' |
| DF | 12 | (Venezuela) Mayker González |
| MF | 8 | (Venezuela) Luis Melo (c) | (yellow card) 75' |
| MF | 28 | (Venezuela) Anderson Cardozo |
| MF | 24 | (Venezuela) Brian Mendoza |
| MF | 18 | (Venezuela) Ángel Osorio | | (substituted off) 62' |
| FW | 9 | (Venezuela) Anthony Uribe |
| FW | 11 | (Venezuela) Juan Falcón | | (substituted off) 78' |
Substitutes:
| GK | 25 | (Venezuela) Giancarlo Schiavone |
| DF | 15 | (Venezuela) Anthony Trujillo |
| MF | 3 | (Venezuela) Cleiderman Osorio | | (substituted on) 55' |
| MF | 10 | (Venezuela) Eduardo Sosa | | (substituted on) 62' |
| MF | 26 | (Venezuela) Víctor Aponte |
| FW | 7 | (Venezuela) Erickson Gallardo | | (substituted on) 78' |
| FW | 16 | (Uruguay) Sebastián Fernández |
Manager:
(Venezuela) Alí Cañas

| GK | 55 | (Venezuela) Luis Romero | | (substituted off) 9' |
| DF | 1 | (Venezuela) Ángel Faría | (yellow card) 72' |
| DF | 13 | (Venezuela) Anthonys Matos |
| DF | 14 | (Venezuela) José Marrufo |
| DF | 30 | (Venezuela) José Granados |
| MF | 6 | (Venezuela) Francisco Flores |
| MF | 19 | (Venezuela) Francisco Pol | (yellow card) 77' | (substituted off) 80' |
| MF | 10 | (Panama) Rolando Escobar | | (substituted off) 62' |
| FW | 11 | (Venezuela) Charlis Ortiz |
| FW | 9 | (Venezuela) Richard Blanco (c) |
| FW | 15 | (Venezuela) Yamil Medina |
Substitutes:
| GK | 22 | (Argentina) Mario Santilli | | (substituted on) 9' |
| DF | – | (Venezuela) Paolo Chacón |
| DF | 28 | (Venezuela) Christian Gómez |
| MF | 7 | (Venezuela) Argenis Gómez | | (substituted on) 62' |
| MF | 8 | (Venezuela) Edson Castillo | | (substituted on) 80' |
| MF | 18 | (Venezuela) Nelson Hernández |
| FW | 21 | (Venezuela) Johan Arrieche |
Manager:
(Venezuela) Juan Tolisano

Assistant referees:
Francisco González
Mauricio Torrealba
Fourth official:
Jean Gómez

Match rules

- 90 minutes.
- Seven named substitutes, of which up to three may be used.

29 November 2017
19:00

| Mineros | 4–3 | Zamora |
|---|---|---|
| Escobar 14'; R. Blanco 33'; C. Ortiz 46', 52' | Report | Uribe 64'; R. Marcano 74', 83' |

Polideportivo Cachamay, Ciudad Guayana
Attendance: 25,811
Referee: José Argote

Mineros won 5–4 on aggregate.

| Mineros | Zamora |

| GK | 22 | (Argentina) Mario Santilli |
| DF | 1 | (Venezuela) Ángel Faría |
| DF | 13 | (Venezuela) Anthonys Matos |
| DF | 14 | (Venezuela) José Marrufo |
| DF | 30 | (Venezuela) José Granados |
| MF | 6 | (Venezuela) Francisco Flores |
| MF | 19 | (Venezuela) Francisco Pol | (yellow card) 40' | (substituted off) 58' |
| MF | 10 | (Panama) Rolando Escobar | | (substituted off) 68' |
| MF | 15 | (Venezuela) Yamil Medina |
| FW | 11 | (Venezuela) Charlis Ortiz |
| FW | 9 | (Venezuela) Richard Blanco (c) | | (substituted off) 62' |
Substitutes:
| GK | 12 | (Venezuela) Jesús Rojas |
| DF | 5 | (Venezuela) Julio Machado |
| MF | 7 | (Venezuela) Argenis Gómez | | (substituted on) 68' |
| MF | 8 | (Venezuela) Edson Castillo | | (substituted on) 58' |
| MF | 18 | (Venezuela) Nelson Hernández |
| MF | 28 | (Venezuela) Christian Gómez |
| FW | 21 | (Venezuela) Johan Arrieche | | (substituted on) 62' |
Manager:
(Venezuela) Juan Tolisano

| GK | 22 | (Venezuela) Joel Graterol |
| DF | 27 | (Venezuela) Kevin de la Hoz |
| DF | 23 | (Venezuela) Óscar Hernández |
| DF | 5 | (Uruguay) Ignacio González (c) |
| DF | 12 | (Venezuela) Mayker González |
| MF | 4 | (Venezuela) Christian Makoun | | (substituted off) 69' |
| MF | 8 | (Venezuela) Luis Melo | (yellow card) 12' |
| MF | 14 | (Venezuela) Diego García | | (substituted off) 56' |
| MF | 18 | (Venezuela) Ángel Osorio | | (substituted off) 69' |
| FW | 9 | (Venezuela) Anthony Uribe |
| FW | 11 | (Venezuela) Juan Falcón | (yellow card) 38' |
Substitutes:
| GK | 25 | (Venezuela) Giancarlo Schiavone |
| DF | 2 | (Venezuela) Javier Maldonado |
| MF | 6 | (Venezuela) José Pinto |
| MF | 24 | (Venezuela) Brian Mendoza | | (substituted on) 69' |
| MF | 30 | (Venezuela) Marcelo Moreno | | (substituted on) 69' |
| FW | 19 | (Venezuela) Rodolfo Marcano | | (substituted on) 56' |
| FW | 20 | (Venezuela) Jorge Páez |
Manager:
(Venezuela) Alí Cañas

Assistant referees:
Jorge Urrego
Carlos López
Fourth official:
Francisco López

Match rules

- 90 minutes.
- If the aggregate score is level, the away goals rule is used to determine the winner.
- Penalty shoot-out if the tie persists.
- Seven named substitutes, of which up to three may be used.
