= Franco Fasciana =

Franco Fasciana can refer to:

- Franco Fasciana (footballer, born 1960)
- Franco Fasciana (footballer, born 1990)
