= Nicolás Massia =

Uruguayan footballer (born 1980)

Personal information
- Full name: Nicolás Massia Arias
- Date of birth: 17 December 1980 (age 45)
- Place of birth: Montevideo, Uruguay
- Height: 1.76 m (5 ft 9 in)
- Position: Midfielder

Team information
- Current team: Monagas SC

Senior career*
Years	Team	Apps	(Gls)
2002	Danubio		
2003–2004	El Tanque Sisley		
2005	Sud América		
2006–2008	Mineros de Guayana	50	(4)
2008–2009	Deportivo Anzoátegui	25	(6)
2009–2010	Mineros de Guayana	18	(1)
2010–2011	Deportivo Anzoátegui	20	(2)
2011–2013	Llaneros de Guanare	7	(1)
2013–	Monagas SC		
- * Club domestic league appearances and goals as of 11 November 2011

Nicolás Massia (born 17 December 1980 in Montevideo) is a Uruguayan footballer who plays for Monagas SC.

== Club career ==
Massia began his career in Uruguay playing for Danubio in the Primera División Uruguaya. He moved to Venezuela to play for Mineros de Guayana in 2006. Massia scored four goals for Mineros in a match against Estrella Roja during the 2007 season.
