= 2009–10 in Venezuelan football =

Football in Venezuela
- Season: 2009–10

The following article presents a summary of the 2009-10 football season in Venezuela.

== Venezuela national team ==
This section will cover Venezuela's games from August 12, 2009 until June 2010.

Date	Venue	Opponents	Score	Comp	Venezuela scorers	Match Report(s)
August 12, 2009	Giants Stadium; New York, United States	Colombia	2 – 1	F	J.M. Rey 34'; O. Vizcarrondo 72'	Report
September 5, 2009	Estadio Monumental; Santiago, Chile	Chile	2 – 2	WCQ2010	G. Maldonado 33'; J.M. Rey 45+1'	Report
September 9, 2009	Estadio Olímpico Luis Ramos; Puerto La Cruz, Venezuela	Peru	3 – 1	WCQ2010	Miku 33', 52'; Vargas 65'	Report
October 10, 2009	Polideportivo Cachamay; Puerto Ordaz, Venezuela	Paraguay	1 – 2	WCQ2010	Rondón 86'	Report
October 14, 2009	Morenão; Campo Grande, Brazil	Brazil	0 – 0	WCQ2010		Report
February 2, 2010	Kyushu Oil Dome; Ōita, Japan	Japan	0 – 0	F		Report
March 3, 2010	Estadio Metropolitano de Fútbol de Lara; Barquisimeto, Venezuela	Panama	1 – 2	F	C. González 94'	Report
March 4, 2010	Estadio Florentino Oropeza; San Felipe, Venezuela	North Korea	1 – 1	F	Angelo Peña 47'	Report
March 6, 2010	Estadio Olímpico Luis Ramos; Puerto La Cruz, Venezuela	North Korea	2 – 1	F	J.L. Granados 8'; M. Sánchez 90'	Report
March 31, 2010	Estadio Municipal Germán Becker; Temuco, Chile	Chile	0 – 0	F		Report
April 21, 2010	Estadio Olímpico Metropolitano; San Pedro Sula, Honduras	Honduras	0 – 1	F	F. Flores 51'	Report
May 20, 2010	Trinidad Stadium; Oranjestad, Aruba	Aruba	0 – 3	F	Á. Chourio 10', 31'; E. Farías 50'	Report
May 22, 2010	Trinidad Stadium; Oranjestad, Aruba	(Aruba) SV Britannia	2 – 4	F		
May 29, 2010	Estadio Metropolitano de Mérida; Mérida, Venezuela	Canada	–	F		
August 11, 2010	Estadio Rommel Fernández; Panama City, Panama	Panama	–	F		

KEY:

  - F = Friendly match
  - WCQ2010 = 2010 FIFA World Cup qualification
