= 2013 South American Junior Championships in Athletics =

XL South American Junior Championships in Athletics
- Dates: October 18–20
- Host city: Resistencia, Chaco, Argentina
- Venue: Estadio Jaime Zapata
- Level: Junior
- Events: 44
- Participation: 271 + 2 guests athletes from 11 + 1 guest nations
- Records set: 6

The 40th South American Junior Championships in Athletics (Spanish: Campeonatos Sudamericanos de Atletismo de Juveniles) were held from October 18–20, 2013 at the Estadio Jaime Zapata in Resistencia, Chaco, Argentina.

== Medal summary ==
Complete results were published.

=== Men ===
| Event | Gold | | Silver | | Bronze | |
|---|---|---|---|---|---|---|
| 100 metres (wind: +2.1 m/s) | Luís Gabriel Silva; Brazil | 10.34 w | Ricardo de Souza; Brazil | 10.42 w | Fredy Maidana; Paraguay | 10.58 w |
| 200 metres (wind: +0.0 m/s) | Vitor Hugo dos Santos; Brazil | 20.74 | Arturo Deliser; Panama | 21.18 | Ricardo de Souza; Brazil | 21.55 |
| 400 metres | Carlos Grachet; Brazil | 46.68 | Alexander Russo; Brazil | 47.40 | Sergio Germain; Chile | 48.05 |
| 800 metres | Lucas Rodrigues; Brazil | 1:53.01 | Luy de Lima; Brazil | 1:53.41 | Miguel Cifuentes; Colombia | 1:54.90 |
| 1500 metres | Thiago André; Brazil | 3:48.42 CR | Matheus Pessoa; Brazil | 3:57.45 | Leonel César; Argentina | 3:58.71 |
| 5000 metres | Thiago André; Brazil | 14:46.51 | Zendio Daza; Peru | 15:05.95 | Yuber Echeverry; Colombia | 15:10.30 |
| 10,000 metres | Victor da Silva; Brazil | 32:49.91 | Ronald da Silva; Brazil | 33:02.56 | Eulalio Muñoz; Argentina | 33:56.48 |
| 110 metres hurdles (wind: +2.6 m/s) | Juan Carlos Moreno; Colombia | 13.64 w | Eduardo de Deus; Brazil | 13.84 w | Diego Lyon; Chile | 13.94 w |
| 400 metres hurdles ^{†} | Jefferson Valencia; Colombia | 52.59 | Jucian Pereira; Brazil | 53.18 | Eduardo de Deus; Brazil | 53.78 |
| 3000 metres steeplechase | Yuber Echeverry; Colombia | 9:26.39 | Nelson Blanco; Colombia | 9:26.67 | Douglas do Nascimento; Brazil | 9:28.48 |
| 4 x 100 metres relay | Brazil; Dyonatan Honório; Vitor Hugo dos Santos; Luís Gabriel Silva; Ricardo de Souza | 40.32 | Argentina; Jorge Caracasis; Emanuel Alessandrini; Esteban Wagner; Daniel Londero | 41.65 | Peru; Zensey Onaja; Jhonatan Grandez; Frank Sánchez; Jorge Luis Rodríguez | 43.02 |
| 4 x 400 metres relay | Brazil; Alexander Russo; Jucian Pereira; Kelvin de Oliveira; Carlos Grachet | 3:13.86 | Argentina; Jorge Caracasis; Esteban Wagner; Marcos Carlomagno; Jeremías Rodríguez | 3:22.72 | Uruguay; Miguel Favilla; Sergio Bautista; Gonzalo Fumont; Ignacio Piquerez | 3:25.38 |
| 10 Kilometres Road Walk | Manuel Esteban Soto; Colombia | 41:55.95 | Brian Pintado; Ecuador | 42:02.20 | Paolo Yurivilca; Peru | 42:25.48 |
| High jump | Yohan Chaverra; Colombia | 2.18 m PB | Fernando Ferreira; Brazil | 2.15 m | Daniel Fernando Cortez; Colombia | 2.15 m |
| Pole vault | Daniel Zupeuc; Chile | 5.00 m | José Pacho; Ecuador | 4.70 m | Matías Guerrero; Chile | 4.20 m |
| Long jump | Lucas dos Santos; Brazil | 7.44 m w (wind: +2.4 m/s) | Juan Mosquera; Panama | 7.40 m w (wind: +2.4 m/s) | Pablo Pereira; Brazil | 7.28 m (wind: +1.3 m/s) |
| Triple jump | Alexsandro de Melo; Brazil | 16.24 m w (wind: +7.6 m/s) | Mateus de Sá; Brazil | 16.14 m w (wind: +5.0 m/s) | Ángelo Valverde; Ecuador | 14.71 m w (wind: +3.1 m/s) |
| Shot put | Nelson Fernandes; Brazil | 20.93 m CR | Willian Dourado; Brazil | 18.39 m | Andrés Lisandro Arce; Argentina | 17.44 m |
| Discus throw | Mauricio Ortega; Colombia | 62.78 m CR | Thiago Negreiros; Brazil | 58.57 m | Eduardo Quintero; Ecuador | 50.86 m |
| Hammer throw | Joaquín Gómez; Argentina | 70.90 m | Hevertt Álvarez; Chile | 67.09 m | Humberto Mansilla; Chile | 66.82 m |
| Javelin throw | Santiago de la Fuente; Chile | 62.41 m | Giovanni Díaz; Paraguay | 62.25 m | Andrés Valencia; Colombia | 60.02 m |
| Decathlon | Kerinde Brites; Brazil | 6711 pts | Lucas Catanhede; Brazil | 6361 pts | Gayell Engeso; Suriname | 6203 pts |

^{†}: In the 400 metres hurdles event, Gerald Drummond from Costa Rica was 3rd in 53.74, running as a guest.

=== Women ===
| Event | Gold | | Silver | | Bronze | |
|---|---|---|---|---|---|---|
| 100 metres (wind: +2.3 m/s) | Ángela Tenorio; Ecuador | 11.24 w | Tamiris de Liz; Brazil | 11.55 w | Noelia Martínez; Argentina | 11.72 w |
| 200 metres (wind: +3.1 m/s) | Ángela Tenorio; Ecuador | 23.35 w | Celene Cevallos; Ecuador | 23.79 w | Tamiris de Liz; Brazil | 23.85 w |
| 400 metres | Celene Cevallos; Ecuador | 54.52 | Yaneth Largacha; Colombia | 55.30 | Sarah Morais; Brazil | 55.98 |
| 800 metres | Ana Karolyne Silva; Brazil | 2:13.69 | María Pía Fernández; Uruguay | 2:14.61 | Yadira Méndez; Ecuador | 2:16.07 |
| 1500 metres | July da Silva; Brazil | 4:28.56 | Zulema Arenas; Peru | 4:29.05 | Katherine Tisalema; Ecuador | 4:49.36 |
| 3000 metres | Zulema Arenas; Peru | 9:51.05 | Jéssica Paguay; Ecuador | 10:05.12 | Lucy Basilio; Peru | 10:14.53 |
| 5000 metres | Jéssica Paguay; Ecuador | 17:30.36 | Lucy Basilio; Peru | 17:40.06 | Zaida Ramos; Peru | 17:44.95 |
| 100 metres hurdles (wind: +2.1 m/s) | Diana Bazalar; Peru | 13.67 w | Inara Cortez; Ecuador | 14.02 w | Gabriela Lima; Brazil | 14.21 w |
| 400 metres hurdles | Nelly Tatiana Sánchez; Colombia | 62.00 | Thainara Oliveira; Brazil | 62.03 | Bruna Maria Cestrem; Brazil | 62.48 |
| 3000 metres steeplechase | Zulema Arenas; Peru | 10:33.66 CR | Lucy Basilio; Peru | 10:53.44 | July da Silva; Brazil | 11:01.95 |
| 4 x 100 metres relay | Ecuador; Kenya Quiñónez; Celene Cevallos; Inara Cortez; Ángela Tenorio | 45.53 | Brazil; Tatiane Pereira; Tamiris de Liz; Andressa Fidelis; Camila de Souza | 45.53 | Argentina; Irina Rodríguez; Noelina Madarieta; Valeria Barón; Noelia Martínez | 46.64 |
| 4 x 400 metres relay | Brazil; Tabata de Carvalho; Lorayna Lima; Dandadeua Brites; Sarah Morais | 3:46.09 | Ecuador; Yuliana Angulo; Yadira Méndez; Virginia Villalba; Celene Cevallos | 3:55.08 | Argentina; Betiana Hernández; Noelia Martínez; Noelina Madarieta; Valeria Barón | 3:56.30 |
| 10 Kilometres Road Walk | Karla Jaramillo; Ecuador | 49:05.84 | Stefany Coronado; Bolivia | 49:09.92 | Sara Pulido; Colombia | 49:33.35 |
| High jump | Ana Paula de Oliveira; Brazil | 1.79 m | Marina Querino; Brazil | 1.77 m | Anyi Paola García; Colombia | 1.68 m |
| Pole vault | Noelina Madarieta; Argentina | 4.05 m | Giseth Montaño; Colombia | 3.70 m | Juliana Campos; Brazil | 3.60 m |
| Long jump | Andressa Fidelis; Brazil | 6.15 m (wind: +1.7 m/s) | Janaína Fernandes; Brazil | 5.96 m (wind: +1.9 m/s) | Nathaly Aranda; Panama | 5.90 m (wind: +1.9 m/s) |
| Triple jump | Claudine de Jesus; Brazil | 13.51 m w (wind: +4.6 m/s) | Gabriele dos Santos; Brazil | 13.37 m (wind: +1.6 m/s) | Adriana Chila; Ecuador | 12.70 m w (wind: +3.3 m/s) |
| Shot put | Izabela da Silva; Brazil | 15.05 m | Cecilia Rodríguez; Uruguay | 14.14 m | Rocío Aranda; Argentina | 13.85 m |
| Discus throw | Izabela da Silva; Brazil | 55.88 m CR | Maia Varela; Argentina | 49.28 m | Anne Caroline da Silva; Brazil | 48.98 m |
| Hammer throw | Paola Miranda; Paraguay | 53.82 m | Elizabeth Mina; Ecuador | 53.53 m | Danna Restrepo; Colombia | 51.90 m |
| Javelin throw | María Mello; Uruguay | 50.27 m CR | Edivania Araújo; Brazil | 50.12 m | Laura Paredes; Paraguay | 47.61 m |
| Heptathlon | Fiorella Chiappe; Argentina | 5452 pts | Kimberly Kuprewicz; Argentina | 4887 pts | Javiera Brahm; Chile | 4817 pts |

== Medal table (unofficial) ==
A medal count was published. There is a slight difference to an unofficial medal count. However, another source supports the number of 7 gold medals for Colombia as published below.

* Host nation (Argentina)

| Rank | Nation | Gold | Silver | Bronze | Total |
|---|---|---|---|---|---|
| 1 | Brazil (BRA) | 21 | 19 | 11 | 51 |
| 2 | Colombia (COL) | 7 | 3 | 7 | 17 |
| 3 | Ecuador (ECU) | 6 | 7 | 5 | 18 |
| 4 | Argentina (ARG)* | 3 | 4 | 7 | 14 |
| 5 | Peru (PER) | 3 | 4 | 4 | 11 |
| 6 | Chile (CHI) | 2 | 1 | 5 | 8 |
| 7 | Uruguay (URU) | 1 | 2 | 1 | 4 |
| 8 | Paraguay (PAR) | 1 | 1 | 2 | 4 |
| 9 | Panama (PAN) | 0 | 2 | 1 | 3 |
| 10 | Bolivia (BOL) | 0 | 1 | 0 | 1 |
| 11 | Suriname (SUR) | 0 | 0 | 1 | 1 |
| Totals (11 entries) | | 44 | 44 | 44 | 132 |

== Team scores ==
Team scores were published.

The host country is highlighted in lavender blue

| Rank | Nation | Points |
|---|---|---|
| 1st place, gold medalist(s) | Brazil | 476 |
| 2nd place, silver medalist(s) | Argentina | 196 |
| 3rd place, bronze medalist(s) | Ecuador | 182 |
| 4 | Colombia | 128 |
| 5 | (Peru) Perú | 89 |
| 6 | Chile | 56 |
| 7 | Uruguay | 54 |
| 8 | Paraguay | 34 |
| 9 | (Panama) Panamá | 19 |
| 10 | Suriname | 14 |
| 11 | Bolivia | 13 |

== Participation ==
The participation of 273 athletes (including 2 guests) from 12 countries (including 1 guest country) is published.

- Argentina (60)
- Bolivia (7)
- Brazil (77)
- Chile (11)
- Colombia (22)
- Ecuador (27)
- (Panama) Panamá (5)
- Paraguay (13)
- (Peru) Perú (20)
- Suriname (3)
- Uruguay (26)

Guest country:

- Costa Rica (2)
