= Rolando Escobar =

Panamanian footballer (born 1981)

Personal information
- Full name: Rolando Emilio Escobar Batista
- Date of birth: 24 October 1981 (age 45)
- Place of birth: Panama City, Panama
- Height: 1.85 m (6 ft 1 in)
- Position: Midfielder

Senior career*
Years	Team	Apps	(Gls)
2000–2003	Atlético Nacional	66	(14)
2004–2006	Municipal Chorrillo	55	(11)
2006–2007	Tauro	40	(8)
2007–2008	Deportivo Táchira	29	(5)
2008–2009	Caracas	33	(2)
2009	San Francisco	15	(3)
2010	Deportivo Lara	16	(2)
2011	Sporting San Miguelito	10	(1)
2012–2015	Deportivo Anzoátegui	104	(31)
2015	FC Dallas	12	(0)

International career^{‡}
2003–	Panama	40	(1)
- * Club domestic league appearances and goals as of 03:21, 22 September 2015 (UTC) ‡ National team caps and goals as of 31 March 2015

Rolando Emilio Escobar Batista (born 24 October 1981) is a Panamanian footballer who plays as a midfielder for Mineros de Guayana of the Venezuelan Primera División.

== Club career ==
A much-travelled midfielder, he has played for several teams in his native Panama as well for 4 different clubs in Venezuela. He won a league title with Deportivo Táchira, then moved to Caracas and played for Deportivo Lara and Deportivo Anzoátegui.

In May 2015, Escobar joined compatriot Blas Pérez at Major League Soccer outfit FC Dallas. Escobar was released in January 2016.

== International career ==
Escobar made his debut for Panama in an August 2003 friendly match against Bolivia and has, as of 10 June 2015, earned a total of 40 caps, scoring 1 goal. He represented his country in 5 FIFA World Cup qualification matches and played at the 2007, 2009 and 2013 CONCACAF Gold Cups.

=== International goals ===
Scores and results list Panama's goal tally first.

#	Date	Venue	Opponent	Score	Result	Competition
1.	12 September 2007	Estadio Olímpico José Antonio Anzoátegui, Puerto La Cruz, Venezuela	Venezuela	0–1	1–1	Friendly

== Honors ==
Tauro

- Liga Panameña de Fútbol: 2007 (A)

Deportivo Táchira

- Venezuelan Primera División: 2007–08

Caracas

- Venezuelan Primera División: 2008–09

Mineros

- Copa Venezuela: 2017

Panama

- CONCACAF Gold Cup runner-up: 2013
