= Iván Sandoval =

Iván Sandoval may refer to:

- Iván Sandoval (Argentine footballer), forward for Cañuelas Fútbol Club
- Iván Sandoval (Chilean footballer), midfielder for C.D. Cobresal
