= Charlis Ortiz =

Venezuelan footballer (born 1986)

Personal information
- Full name: Charlis José Ortiz García
- Date of birth: 21 July 1986 (age 40)
- Place of birth: El Tigre, Venezuela
- Height: 1.80 m (5 ft 11 in)
- Position: Forward

Team information
- Current team: Universidad Central
- Number: 21

Youth career
- Angostura

Senior career*
Years	Team	Apps	(Gls)
2007–2008	Atlético PDVSA Gas		
2008	Minervén		
2009	Angostura		
2009–2010	Centro Ítalo		(4)
2010–2013	Real Esppor	64	(16)
2012–2013	→ Deportivo Táchira (loan)	29	(4)
2013–2015	Deportivo La Guaira	48	(3)
2015–2017	Deportivo Anzoátegui	73	(18)
2017–2019	Mineros de Guayana	60	(9)
2018	→ Huachipato (loan)	13	(0)
2019–2021	Deportivo La Guaira	61	(11)
2022–2024	Metropolitanos	75	(23)
2024–	Universidad Central	44	(12)
- * Club domestic league appearances and goals as of 10 March 2026

Charlis José Ortiz García (born 21 July 1986) is a Venezuelan footballer who plays for Universidad Central.

== Teams ==
- (Venezuela) Atlético PDVSA Gas 2007–2008
- (Venezuela) Minervén 2008
- (Venezuela) Angostura 2009
- (Venezuela) Centro Ítalo 2009–2010
- (Venezuela) Real Esppor 2010–2012
- (Venezuela) Deportivo Táchira 2012–2013
- (Venezuela) Deportivo La Guaira 2013–2015
- (Venezuela) Deportivo Anzoátegui 2015–2017
- (Venezuela) Mineros de Guayana 2017–2018
- (Chile) Huachipato 2018
- (Venezuela) Mineros de Guayana 2019
- (Venezuela) Deportivo La Guaira 2019–2021
- (Venezuela) Metropolitanos 2022-2024
- (Venezuela) Universidad Central 2024–Present
