= Juan Domingo Tolisano =

Venezuelan football manager

Personal information
- Full name: Juan Domingo Tolisano Correa
- Date of birth: 7 August 1984 (age 42)
- Place of birth: San Cristóbal, Venezuela

Team information
- Current team: Venezuela U20 (manager)

Managerial career
- Years: Team
- 2005–2006: Atlético Táchira
- 2006–2009: Lotería del Táchira (youth)
- 2009–2012: Lotería del Táchira
- 2012–2014: Deportivo Táchira B
- 2014–2015: Zulia (assistant)
- 2015–2016: Zulia
- 2016: Carabobo
- 2017–2018: Mineros
- 2019–2021: Deportivo Táchira
- 2022: Deportes Antofagasta
- 2022: Academia Puerto Cabello
- 2023: Carabobo
- 2024–2025: Deportivo La Guaira
- 2026–: Venezuela U20

Juan Domingo Tolisano Correa (born 7 August 1984) is a Venezuelan football manager, currently in charge of the Venezuela national under-20 team.

== Career ==
Born in San Cristóbal, Táchira, Tolisano started his managerial career in 2005 with Atlético Táchira. In the following year, he joined Lotería del Táchira as their under-20 manager, and was named first team manager of the club in 2009.

In July 2012, Tolisano was named youth coordinator at Deportivo Táchira, being also in charge of the B-team in Segunda División. He left the club in 2014 to become an assistant manager at Zulia, and became the club's manager in October 2015.

Tolisano left Zulia in a mutual agreement on 4 April 2016, and was appointed at the helm of Carabobo seven days later. On 11 November, after qualifying the latter team to the 2017 Copa Libertadores, he left after refusing a renewal offer.

On 1 December 2016, Tolisano took over Mineros de Guayana. On 22 November 2018, after winning the 2017 Copa Venezuela, he left the club.

On 7 March 2019, Tolisano returned to Deportivo Táchira, now appointed first team manager. After winning the Primera División title with Táchira in 2021, he was appointed as manager of Chilean side Deportes Antofagasta on 21 December 2021.

Tolisano was sacked by Antofagasta on 18 April 2022, with the club in the last position. He returned to his home country on 13 May, after being named at the helm of Academia Puerto Cabello. He left the club on 31 October, and returned to Carabobo on 17 November.

Tolisano left Carabobo on 13 October 2023, after his contract would not be renewed. On 23 March of the following year, he replaced Kike García at the helm of Deportivo La Guaira also in the top tier.

On 20 January 2026, Tolisano left La Guaira to take over the Venezuela national under-20 team.

== Honours ==
Mineros

- Copa Venezuela: 2017

Deportivo Táchira

- Venezuelan Primera División: 2021
