= Aubone =

Aubone may refer to:

== People ==
=== First name ===
- Aubone Surtees (1865–1923), English rugby union forward

=== Surname ===
- Ana Fabiola Aubone (born 1977), Argentine politician
- Guillermo Aubone (born 1954), Argentinian former professional tennis player
- Mauricio Aubone (born 1992), Argentine footballer
- Roberto Aubone (born 1939), Argentine former professional tennis player
