= Santilli =

Santilli is an Italian surname. Notable people with the surname include:

- Antonia Santilli (born 1949), Italian actress and model
- Alcide "Al" Santilli (1914 - 2007), U.S. Army veteran and American glider pilot
- Ivana Santilli (born 1975), Canadian R&B singer and multi-instrumentalist
- Diego Santilli (born 1967), Argentine politician
- Mario Santilli (born 1984), Argentine footballer
- Ray Santilli (born 1958), British musician, record, and film producer
- Roberto Santilli (born 1965), Italian volleyball coach
- Ruggero Santilli (born 1935), Italian-American nuclear physicist known for his fringe science
