= Daniel Lanata =

Argentine football manager

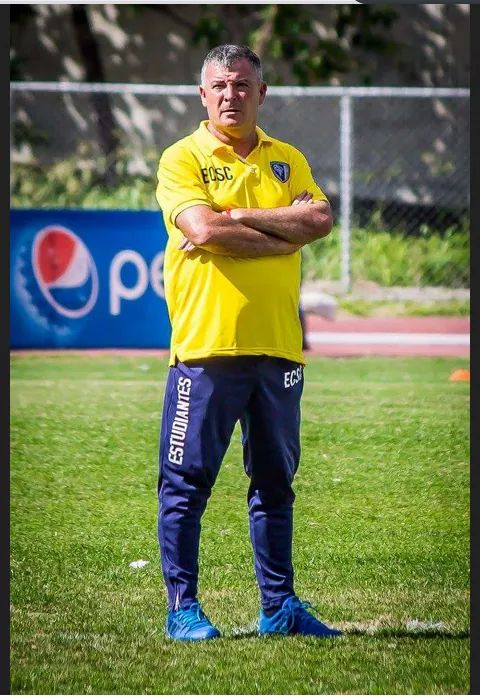

Personal information
- Full name: Daniel Ermindo Lanata
- Date of birth: 25 June 1966 (age 60)
- Place of birth: Casilda, Argentina

Managerial career
- Years: Team
- 2003: Monagas
- 2003–2004: Deportivo Anzoátegui
- 2005: Deportivo Anzoátegui
- 2006: Sportivo Luqueño
- 2007: 2 de Mayo
- 2007: Tacuary
- 2007–2008: Sportivo Luqueño
- 2008–2009: Estrella Roja
- 2009: Al-Qadisiyah
- 2009: 12 de Octubre
- 2010: Sportivo Patria
- 2011: 3 de Febrero
- 2012: Sportivo Luqueño
- 2013: Martín Ledesma
- 2013–2014: Caacupé FBC
- 2014: Capitán Figari
- 2014: Sportivo Trinidense
- 2015: Deportivo Liberación
- 2016: Estudiantes de Caracas
- 2017–2018: Sportivo Iteño
- 2018: Deportivo Liberación
- 2018–2019: Ovetense
- 2020–2021: Deportivo FATIC
- 2021–2022: Tacuary

Daniel Ermindo Lanata (born 25 June 1966) is an Argentine football manager.
