= Francisco Flores (Venezuelan footballer) =

Venezuelan footballer (born 1990)

Personal information
- Full name: Francisco Javier Flores Sequera
- Date of birth: April 30, 1990 (age 36)
- Place of birth: Barquisimeto, Venezuela
- Height: 1.78 m (5 ft 10 in)
- Position: Defensive midfielder

Team information
- Current team: Deportivo Lara

Youth career
- Maximo Viloria FC

Senior career*
Years	Team	Apps	(Gls)
2006–2009	Guaros FC	42	(2)
2009–2011	Deportivo Lara	47	(4)
2011–2012	Deportivo Anzoátegui	45	(2)
2012–2016	Deportivo Táchira	108	(1)
2017–2019	Mineros de Guayana	102	(1)
2020	Independiente Medellín	3	(0)
2021–2023	Deportivo Táchira	69	(2)
2023–2024	Carabobo FC	37	(1)
2025	Deportivo La Guaira	25	(1)
2026-	Deportivo Lara	?	(?)

International career^{‡}
2009–	Venezuela	27	(1)
- * Club domestic league appearances and goals as of 16:08, 25 October 2020 (UTC) ‡ National team caps and goals as of 13:02, 09 June 2017 (UTC)

Francisco Javier Flores Sequera (born April 30, 1990) is a Venezuelan footballer who plays as a defensive midfielder for Deportivo Lara.

== Club career ==
In 2006, he signed with Guaros FC and later in 2009 with Deportivo Lara reaching the rank of club captain. On 30 June 2011, he joined Deportivo Anzoátegui.

== International career ==
Flores has played five times for the Under-20 national team of Venezuela, scoring a goal, and participating in the achievement of qualifying to the Egypt U-20 World Cup in 2009. He also served as captain of that team the previous season.

=== International goals ===
Scores and results list Venezuela's goal tally first.

No	Date	Venue	Opponent	Score	Result	Competition
1.	April 21, 2010	Estadio Olímpico Metropolitano, San Pedro Sula, Honduras	Honduras	1–0	1–0	Friendly
