= Fernando Aristeguieta =

Venezuelan footballer (born 1992)

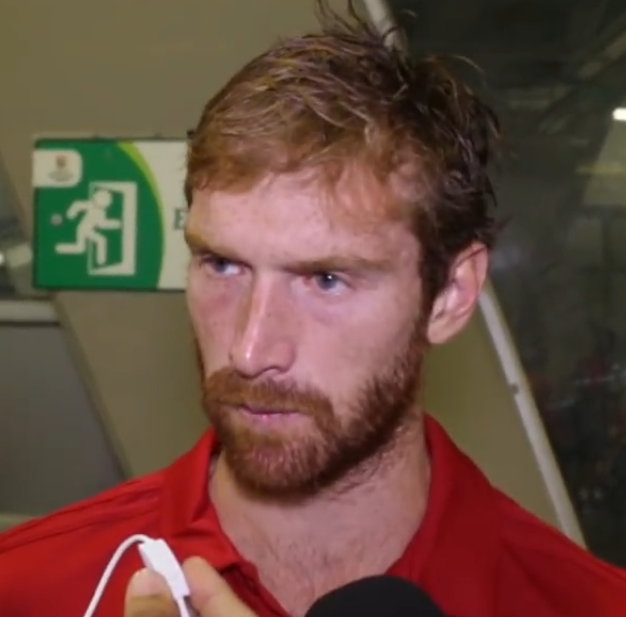
- Aristeguieta in 2018

Personal information
- Full name: Fernando Luis Aristeguieta de Luca
- Date of birth: 9 April 1992 (age 34)
- Place of birth: Caracas, Venezuela
- Height: 1.87 m (6 ft 1 1/2 in)
- Position: Striker

Team information
- Current team: Venezuela (assistant)

Youth career
- 1999–2007: San Ignacio de Loyola
- 2007: Centro Ítalo
- 2007–2009: Caracas

Senior career*
Years	Team	Apps	(Gls)
2009–2013	Caracas	71	(31)
2013–2017	Nantes	45	(9)
2015	→ Philadelphia Union (loan)	21	(5)
2016	→ Red Star (loan)	8	(1)
2017	Nacional	13	(1)
2017–2018	Caracas	27	(15)
2018–2019	América de Cali	37	(19)
2019–2020	Morelia	31	(8)
2020–2021	Mazatlán	31	(7)
2021–2023	Puebla	35	(10)
2023	→ Caracas (loan)	3	(1)
Total		327	(108)

International career
2010–2022	Venezuela	29	(1)

Managerial career
- 2024: Puebla U23
- 2024: Puebla (interim)
- 2024–2026: Caracas
- 2025: Venezuela (interim)
- 2026–: Venezuela (assistant)
- * Club domestic league appearances and goals

Fernando Luis Aristeguieta de Luca (born 9 April 1992) is a Venezuelan professional football manager and former player who played as a striker. He is the current assistant manager of the Venezuela national team.

Aristeguieta began his professional career with Caracas in 2009 and stayed at the club until 2013. At age 20, he was the top goalscorer in the Torneo Apertura 2012, scoring 14 goals. In his first season in France, he helped his team Nantes to achieve promotion to Ligue 1 in the 2012–13 season.

He is the only player in history who has scored a hat-trick in the Venezuelan Clásico, which is played between the two most popular teams in the country: Caracas and Deportivo Táchira. He also became the first Venezuelan player in history to score a goal in Ligue 1 of France. He was the first player to score a goal for Mazatlán after its foundation in June 2020.

Aristeguieta has played for the Venezuela national team since 2010.

== Early life ==
=== School ===
He studied at the Colegio San Ignacio de Loyola. He also managed to represent their school in Recreational Mathematics Olympics five times, in which he was the runner up in 2006. In the summer of 2007 and 2008 he studied English at the Cushing Academy institution, located in the city of Ashburnham, Massachusetts, achieving complete mastery of the language. During these years, he took the decision to leave school in order to fully focus on soccer, causing quarrels with his parents. Aristeguieta wanted to graduate in a school for athletes; however, he decided to finish at his school. He graduated in July 2010.

=== Sports ===
At age 7, he joined the Loyola football team, being coached by former Caracas and Venezuela national team player Leopoldo Páez, who Aristeguieta considers his mentor both on and off the pitch. Simultaneously he was practicing tennis, participating in tournaments at regional, national and international levels. In that list, was leader David Souto, who is currently in first place in the ranking of Venezuelan men's professional tennis. However, in the same year of publication, Aristeguieta decided to retire from tennis to specialize in football.

As a soccer player, he represented his school in Caracas Sports School League and the League César Del Vecchio. He also played in several international championships in European cities such as Barcelona, Gothenburg, Regina, Milan, San Sebastián and Dallas. At 15 he left Loyola to join the football team Centro Ítalo Venezolano.

== Club career ==
=== Caracas ===
In his first year at the club he managed to win the U-17 National Championship in the 2007–2008 season, being the top goalscorer with 21 goals. Aristeguieta turned down offers from teams like Tenerife, Real Oviedo, and Grêmio to continue his studies.

He debuted in the first division in Venezuela with Caracas in the 2009/2010 season. In his first season, he played 20 games and scored 6 times, scoring his first professional goal on his debut against Trujillanos, in the city of Valera, on 16 August 2009. On 10 March 2010, he had his international tournament debut, coming in at the 77th min. for Rafael Castellín, in the 2010 Copa Libertadores match against Flamengo, which Caracas lost 1–3 at home; that game was the last of Noel Sanvicente coaching the club.

On 30 July 2010 he suffered a ruptured cruciate ligament in his left knee that would keep him sidelined nine months, missing the Copa Sudamericana 2011 and the 2011 South American U-20 Championship.

First division of Venezuela in the season of 2011/2012 was the rebirth of the redhead forward, which few expected after his painful injury. In the first round against Trujillanos FC, he played 26 minutes. He makes his first goal of the season against the Football Club Tucanes Amazon in New Haven when he had entered 67 minutes, from there he was awarded with being a starter. The next match against Llaneros de Guanare Futbol Club he scored two goals. This game was played over two days due to power failure. The next day he repeated the feat at Mineros de Guayana in the Olympic Stadium UCV to score two of the four goals that the Nerazzurri embedded computer, the next 2 days and also scored a run and managed 4 consecutive days scoring. From there, the front began to be recognized and loved by the Reds fans before the game occasionally chanted "Aristeguieta, Aristeguieta". Having already spent a long injury of 9 months, he was still having knee problems since in season 2 occasions received short-term injuries. In the Torneo Clausura 2012, he scored only 4 goals. At this time he was very critical of the low production of plays in attack and the lack of scoring. They had to settle for finishing second in the standings.

For the 2012/2013 season, reinforcements were sought in the offense, with the Uruguayan Rino Lucas, Chilean Sebastián González and around Daniel Febles, the performance of Aristeguieta was dented in the biggest games for the arrival of two foreign players. It opens in the network on August 29 against Atlético Miranda in the 2012 Copa Venezuela. The poor performances of Chilean striker in the first games of the season Aristeguieta helped win more opportunities. In the second leg against Atletico Miranda he scores 2 goals and classified with an overall 7–6. He Scores the third double of his career on October 21, 2012, versus Real Esppor Club. On the 18th of the following month, an excellent performance curdles when getting his first hat-trick to the Llaneros de Guanare, a fundamental part as the team managed to win 4–1. Repeat this action on December 9 against Deportivo Táchira in Sports Pueblo Nuevo and being the only player that Caracas has scored three goals against his archrival. He finished the Torneo Apertura 2012 ( Venezuela) as a leader in the scoring by scoring 14 goals that helped his team not to pass the second place.

=== Nantes ===
After passing the medical and psychological exams, on 10 January 2013 he signed a six-month contract on loan with FC Nantes of the French Ligue 2. He did not count towards the club's quota of non-EU players due to being a dual Venezuelan-Spanish citizen (coming from a family of Basque origin).

He made his debut on 19 January, entering in the 87th minute of the match against Stade Lavallois Mayenne FC. Within minutes he had the opportunity to make a header, but the ball went just inches from the corner. He debuted as a starter on 22 January in the French Cup against SAS Epinal, which finished with a 1–1 draw.

On 12 February 2013 he scored two goals in the match against Le Mans FC. The first came in the 7th minute after a deep cross from the left which Aristeguieta controlled with his chest and then finished with a half volley into the bottom right. The second came off a deflected pass which he shot first time with his left foot into the roof of the net. On 15 April he scores his first hat trick with the French team at the Berrichonne Chateauroux. In addition to this, he also caused the second yellow card of a rival. Eleven days later he scores the only goal of the match against Chamois Niortais F.C. On 16 May, Aristeguieta was elected the best player of the month of April with 46% of the vote. On 17 May Nantes secured promotion to the Ligue 1 after beating CS Sedan

Nantes FC gave the option to buy him for 1.2 million euros, extending the contract for 3 years. He was given the number 10 and also shared a room with Venezuelans Gabriel Cichero and Oswaldo Vizcarrondo, who had been photographed with Aristeguieta in his first training with the senior team of Caracas Futbol Club.

On 28 November 2014, after being sparingly used by Nantes, Aristeguieta moved to La Liga's Getafe CF, on loan until June. On 7 January 2015 he passed a medical in the Madrid outskirts club, but his loan was cancelled on the 31st.

==== Philadelphia Union (loan) ====
On February 20, 2015, it was confirmed that Aristeguieta had joined Major League Soccer side Philadelphia Union on loan.

=== Caracas ===
In July 2017, Aristeguieta returned to Caracas and signed a 1.5-year deal.

== International career ==
=== Youth level ===
He began his involvement in the Venezuelan selection in the U-15 category to compete in the 2007 South American U-15 Championship played in Porto Alegre. Aristeguieta managed to be the top scorer of his team with three goals. Venezuela narrowly missed out on qualifying to the second round due to goal difference.

He was present in 48 friendly matches of the U-17 level in preparation for the 2009 U-17 South American League the city of Iquique, where the team finished in last place in their group. He also participated in Bolivarian Games of 2009 scoring 1 goal in that tournament and the Venezuela National Team won the bronze medal.

=== Senior team ===
Aristigueta made his senior team debut on 2 February 2010 against Japan with the number 7 and was replaced by Alexander Rondón after 70 minutes. He was again called up for the friendly against Chile on 31 March, playing 8 minutes in the last game of the Marcelo Bielsa era.

He was subsequently called up for the match against El Salvador, the first after the 2011 Copa America, and scored a goal, thanks to an assist from Yonathan Del Valle.

On 7 October 2011, he made his competitive debut on the first matchday of the 2014 FIFA World Cup qualifiers against Ecuador at Estadio Olímpico Atahualpa in Quito. After a year without playing for the national team, he played five minutes on 14 November 2012 against Nigeria.

On 27 March 2013, He started against rivals Colombia. Wearing the number 9, he had two clear chances, including a possible goal, which was blocked off the goal line by a Colombian defender. Eventually his team won 1–0 at the Cachamay Stadium.

== Managerial career ==
After retiring, Aristeguieta was appointed manager of the under-23 squad of former club Club Puebla. On 24 February 2024, he was named interim manager of the first team after the sacking of Ricardo Carbajal, but returned to his previous role on 12 March after the appointment of Andrés Carevic.

On 6 July 2024, Aristeguieta was named in charge of another club he represented as a player, Caracas. On 7 November 2025, he was named interim manager of the national team for two friendlies against Australia and Canada.

On 22 April 2026, Aristeguieta resigned from Caracas, joining the technical staff of Oswaldo Vizcarrondo in the national team.

== Personal life ==
He got married in 2017 with Linden Azcunes. They have one child together, a son, Lucas Ezio Aristeguieta, born on June 6, 2019. In July 2020 they announced that they are expecting a girl named Sofía Alexandra.

== Career statistics ==
=== Club ===
As of match played 21 April 2023

Appearances and goals by club, season and competition
Club	Season	League			Cup		League Cup		Continental		Other		Total	
Club	Season	Division	Apps	Goals	Apps	Goals	Apps	Goals	Apps	Goals	Apps	Goals	Apps	Goals
Caracas	2009–10	Venezuelan Primera División	20	6	1	0	—		2	0	—		23	6
Caracas	2010–11	Venezuelan Primera División	3	0	0	0	—		—		—		3	0
Caracas	2011–12	Venezuelan Primera División	31	11	6	0	—		3	1	—		40	12
Caracas	2012–13	Venezuelan Primera División	17	14	5	4	—		4	0	—		26	18
Caracas	Total		71	31	12	4	—		9	1	—		92	36
Nantes	2012–13	Ligue 2	17	8	1	0	—		—		—		18	8
Nantes	2013–14	Ligue 1	22	2	1	0	2	1	—		—		25	3
Nantes	2014–15	Ligue 1	6	0	1	0	1	0	—		—		8	0
Nantes	2016–17	Ligue 1	5	0	0	0	1	0	—		—		6	0
Nantes	Total		50	10	3	0	4	1	—		—		57	11
Philadelphia Union (loan)	2015	Major League Soccer	21	5	1	0	—		—		—		22	5
Red Star (loan)	2015–16	Ligue 2	8	1	—		—		—		—		3	1
C.D. Nacional	2016–17	Primeira Liga	13	1	—		—		—		—		13	1
Caracas	2017	Venezuelan Primera División	15	7	2	1	—		—		—		17	8
Caracas	2018	Venezuelan Primera División	12	8	0	0	—		2	1	—		14	9
Caracas	Total		27	15	2	1	—		2	1	—		31	17
América de Cali	2018	Categoría Primera A	15	5	1	2	—		—		—		16	7
América de Cali	2019	Categoría Primera A	22	14	0	0	—		—		—		22	14
América de Cali	Total		37	19	1	2	—		—		—		38	21
Atlético Morelia	2019–20	Liga MX	31	8	6	2	—		—		—		37	10
Mazatlán	2020–21	Liga MX	31	7	—		—		—		—		31	7
América de Cali	2021–22	Liga MX	32	9	—		—		—		—		32	9
América de Cali	2022–23	Liga MX	3	1	—		—		—		—		3	1
América de Cali	Total		35	10	—		—		—		—		35	10
Caracas	2023	Venezuelan Primera División	3	1	—		—		0	0	—		3	1
Career total			327	108	25	9	4	1	11	2	0	0	367	120

=== International ===
As of match played 6 June 2022

Appearances and goals by national team and year
National team	Year	Apps	Goals
Venezuela	2010	2	0
Venezuela	2011	4	1
Venezuela	2012	1	0
Venezuela	2013	6	0
Venezuela	2014	2	0
Venezuela	2018	0	0
Venezuela	2019	3	0
Venezuela	2020	1	0
Venezuela	2021	7	0
Venezuela	2022	3	0
Total		29	1

As of match played 7 August 2011
Scores and results list Venezuela's goal tally first, score column indicates score after each Aristeguieta goal.

List of international goals scored by Fernando Aristeguieta
No.	Date	Venue	Opponent	Score	Result	Competition
1	7 August 2011	Robert F. Kennedy, Washington, United States	El Salvador	1–0	2–1	Friendly

== Honours ==
Caracas

- Venezuelan First Division: 2009–10
- Copa Venezuela: 2009
