= Iván Sandoval (Argentine footballer) =

Argentine footballer

Personal information
- Full name: Iván Darío Sandoval
- Date of birth: 5 August 1995 (age 31)
- Place of birth: Mendoza, Argentina
- Height: 1.83 m (6 ft 0 in)
- Position: Forward

Team information
- Current team: Deportivo Maipú

Youth career
- Fundación Godoy Cruz
- Argentinos Juniors

Senior career*
Years	Team	Apps	(Gls)
2016–2018	Argentinos Juniors	0	(0)
2016–2017	→ Fénix (loan)	18	(4)
2017	→ Margarita (loan)		
2018	→ Cañuelas (loan)	15	(3)
2019–2020	Argentino de Quilmes	36	(10)
2021–2022	Defensores de Belgrano	46	(8)
2023	Brown Adrogué	23	(6)
2024	Estudiantes BA	13	(0)
2024	Atlético Rafaela	9	(1)
2025–	Deportivo Maipú	19	(1)
- * Club domestic league appearances and goals as of 16:47, 4 August 2025 (UTC)

Iván Darío Sandoval (born 5 August 1995) is an Argentine professional footballer who plays as a forward for Deportivo Maipú.

== Career ==
Sandoval played for Fundación Godoy Cruz before he signed for Argentinos Juniors. In June 2016, Fénix of Primera B Metropolitana loaned Sandoval. He scored three goals in four matches during the following November, netting goals against Talleres, Excursionistas and Tristán Suárez. He returned to his parent club six months later, having scored four goals (all at home) in eighteen games. On 21 July 2017, Sandoval joined Venezuelan Segunda División side Margarita on loan. Sandoval scored two in a Copa Venezuela third stage first leg vs. Deportivo Anzoátegui in August as Margarita eliminated the Venezuelan Primera División club.

July 2018 saw Sandoval depart out on loan again, this time signing for Primera C Metropolitana's Cañuelas. He came back following three goals and fifteen appearances, prior to leaving Argentinos Juniors permanently to sign for fourth tier team Argentino.

Ahead of the 2021 season, Sandoval signed with Defensores de Belgrano.

== Career statistics ==
As of 21 June 2019.

Club statistics
Club	Season	League			Cup		League Cup		Continental		Other		Total	
Club	Season	Division	Apps	Goals	Apps	Goals	Apps	Goals	Apps	Goals	Apps	Goals	Apps	Goals
Argentinos Juniors	2016–17	Primera B Nacional	0	0	0	0	—		—		0	0	0	0
Argentinos Juniors	2017–18	Primera División	0	0	0	0	—		—		0	0	0	0
Argentinos Juniors	2018–19	Primera División	0	0	0	0	—		—		0	0	0	0
Argentinos Juniors	Total		0	0	0	0	—		—		0	0	0	0
Fénix (loan)	2016–17	Primera B Metropolitana	18	4	0	0	—		—		0	0	18	4
Cañuelas (loan)	2018–19	Primera C Metropolitana	15	3	0	0	—		—		0	0	15	3
Argentino	2018–19	Primera C Metropolitana	4	1	0	0	—		—		0	0	4	1
Career total			37	8	0	0	—		—		0	0	37	8
