= Esteban Velásquez =

Chilean politician

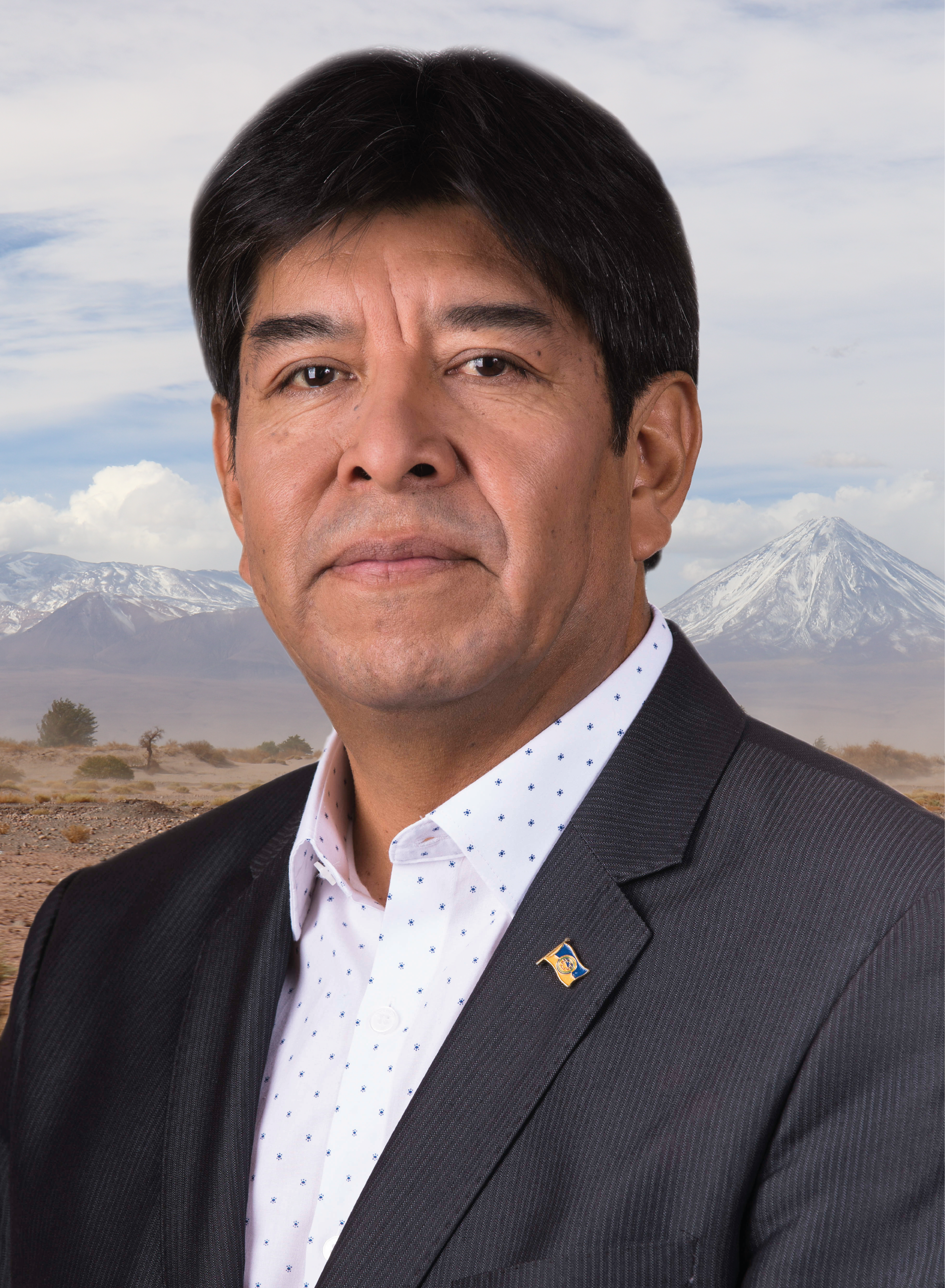

Member of the Senate
- Incumbent
- Assumed office 11 March 2022
- Constituency: 3rd Circunscription (Antofagasta Region)

Member of the Chamber of Deputies
- In office 11 March 2022 – 11 March 2018
- Preceded by: Creation of the District
- Constituency: District 3

Mayor of Calama
- In office 6 December 2008 – 17 November 2016
- Preceded by: Arturo Molina Henríquez
- Succeeded by: Daniel Augusto Pérez

Councilmen of Calama
- In office 6 December 2004 – 6 December 2008

Personal details
- Born: 26 December 1962 (age 63) Calama, Chile
- Party: Party for Democracy; Social Green Regionalist Federation
- Spouse: Anabella Lizama
- Children: Two
- Parent(s): Irineo Velásquez; Marta Núñez Romero
- Relatives: Hernán Velásquez (brother)
- Education: University of Tarapacá (BA) (MA)
- Occupation: Politician
- Profession: Teacher

Esteban Jorge Velásquez Núñez (born 26 December 1962) is a Chilean teacher and politician who currently serves in the Senate of Chile.

From 2011 to 2013, Velásquez led various strikes in Calama. With this, he achieved the expansion of avenues, the construction of the Carlos Cisterna Hospital, and the new Cobreloa stadium: the Estadio Zorros del Desierto.

== Early life and education ==
Esteban Jorge Velásquez Núñez was born in Calama on 26 December 1962, the son of Irineo Velázquez Alvarado and Marta Núñez Romero. He is the brother of Hernán Velásquez, former municipal councillor of Calama (2008–2016) and member of the Constitutional Convention. He is married and has three children.

He completed his primary education at the Escuela de la Población O’Higgins in Calama and his secondary education at the Instituto Obispo Silva Lezaeta in the same city. He later studied Primary Education Teaching at the Arturo Prat University in Arica, graduating in 1985, and completed a postgraduate diploma in Educational Guidance at that institution in 1989. In 1996, he obtained a Master’s degree in Education from the University of Tarapacá, specializing in Educational Administration.

== Professional career ==
Following his graduation, Velásquez worked as a classroom teacher at the Liceo Domingo Santa María in Arica between 1986 and 1989. In 1990, he returned to Calama, where he served as both teacher and educational counsellor at Colegio Juan Pablo II until 1992.

In 1993, he was appointed principal of Colegio Calama, a state-subsidized private school, a position he held until 2000. Between 2001 and 2004, he served as Regional Director of the National School Assistance and Scholarship Board (JUNAEB) in the Antofagasta Region, temporarily stepping away from classroom teaching.

After an unsuccessful municipal candidacy, he returned to the education sector in 2005 as principal of Colegio Catherine Booth of the Salvation Army in Calama. This was the final stage of his professional career in education, as he was elected mayor of Calama in 2008. In January 2017, following his mayoral tenure, he assumed the role of Coordinator of Parent Associations at the Social Development Corporation of the Municipality of Antofagasta.

== Political career ==
Velásquez began his political career in the 2000 municipal elections, running as a candidate of the Party for Democracy (PPD) for the municipal council of Calama. He was elected councillor with 1,407 votes, representing 2.69% of the total vote. In 2004, he resigned from the PPD to run for mayor of Calama in the first direct mayoral election, obtaining 14,749 votes (29.84%) but failing to secure the office.

In the 2008 municipal elections, he was elected mayor of Calama as an independent candidate within the electoral list “Por un Chile Limpio,” led by the Independent Regionalist Party (PRI). He won with 21,277 votes (43.3%), defeating Arturo Molina, who had also been his opponent in the 2004 election. During his tenure, he played a coordinating role within the Association of Northern Mayors under the slogan “Un solo Norte,” and participated in the Calama city strike of 29 August 2011.

He was re-elected mayor in the 2012 municipal elections as an independent candidate on the Progressive Party (PRO) list, securing 23,769 votes (58.10%). In 2014, he was appointed a member of the Presidential Advisory Commission on Decentralization and Regional Development, established by President Michelle Bachelet.

In 2016, he ran unsuccessfully for a third term as mayor of Calama as an independent candidate outside any electoral pact, obtaining 7,293 votes (21.68%). He subsequently resigned from office on 16 November 2016 to pursue a seat in the Chamber of Deputies. Although he initially sought to compete within the Broad Front under the Citizen Power Party, he ultimately ran as a candidate of the Green Regionalist Federation.

In the 2017 Chilean general election, he was elected deputy for the 3rd electoral district of the Antofagasta Region with 10,067 votes (6.20%). In August 2021, he registered his candidacy for the Senate representing the Social Green Regionalist Federation (FRVS) in the 3rd senatorial constituency (Antofagasta Region) for the 2022–2030 term. He was elected within the Apruebo Dignidad pact with 39,580 votes (21.15%), achieving the highest vote share in the constituency.
