= Andrés Valencia =

Colombian footballer (born 1991)

Personal information
- Full name: Andrés Felipe Valencia Ambuila
- Date of birth: 15 January 1991 (age 35)
- Place of birth: Suárez, Colombia
- Height: 1.73 m (5 ft 8 in)
- Position: Attacking midfielder

Team information
- Current team: Margarita

Youth career
- América de Cali

Senior career*
Years	Team	Apps	(Gls)
2009–2012	América de Cali	21	(2)
2013	Boyacá Chicó		
2014	Bogotá	3	(0)
2015–2016	Estudiantes de Mérida		
2017–	Margarita		
- * Club domestic league appearances and goals as of 14 September 2014

Andrés Felipe Valencia Ambuila (born 15 January 1991) is a Colombian footballer who plays as an attacking midfielder for Margarita.
