= Thomas Riveros =

Venezuelan-Chilean footballer

Personal information
- Full name: Thomas Riveros Eugui
- Date of birth: 5 October 2001 (age 25)
- Place of birth: Caracas, Venezuela
- Height: 1.81 m (5 ft 11 in)
- Position: Goalkeeper

Team information
- Current team: Monagas

Youth career
- Deportivo La Guaira

Senior career*
Years	Team	Apps	(Gls)
2019–2020	Deportivo La Guaira		
2020	→ Universidad Central (loan)		
2021–2024	Carabobo	14	(0)
2025–	Monagas	0	(0)
- * Club domestic league appearances and goals as of 16 January 2025

Thomas Riveros Eugui (born 5 October 2001) is a Venezuelan footballer who plays as a goalkeeper for Monagas.

== Career ==
A product of the Deportivo La Guaira youth system, Riveros played for them in the Venezuelan top level and Universidad Central in the second level before joining Carabobo in 2021.

In 2025, Riveros signed with Monagas.

At international level, he was frequently called up to training sessions of the Venezuela under-20 national team.

== Personal life ==
Riveros holds the Chilean nationality by descent, since his father and his paternal family are Chileans.
