= José Luis Marrufo =

Venezuelan footballer (born 1996)

José Marrufo
Personal information
- Full name: José Luis Marrufo Jiménez
- Date of birth: 12 May 1996 (age 30)
- Place of birth: Caracas, Venezuela
- Height: 1.80 m (5 ft 11 in)
- Position: Defender

Team information
- Current team: Macará

Youth career
- –2014: Deportivo Lara

Senior career*
| Years | Team | Apps | (Gls) |
| 2014–2015 | Deportivo Lara | 21 | (2) |
| 2015–2016 | Deportivo Táchira | 27 | (1) |
| 2017–2019 | Mineros de Guayana | 84 | (5) |
| 2020 | Estudiantes de Mérida | 17 | (0) |
| 2021 | Jaguares de Córdoba | 32 | (1) |
| 2022-2023 | Deportivo Táchira | 65 | (3) |
| 2024- | Macará | 6 | (0) |

International career^{‡}
| 2013 | Venezuela U17 | 10 | (0) |
| 2015 | Venezuela U20 | 3 | (0) |
| 2014 | Venezuela U21 | 5 | (0) |
- * Club domestic league appearances and goals as of 13:43, 06 October 2021 (UTC). ‡ National team caps and goals as of 16:58, 5 June 2017 (UTC)

José Luis Marrufo Jiménez (born 12 May 1996) is a Venezuelan footballer who plays as a defender for Macará.

== Club career ==
Marrufo signed for Mineros de Guayana ahead of the 2017 season.

== Career statistics ==
=== Club ===
As of 5 June 2017

| Club performance | | League | | Cup | | Continental | | Total | |
| Club | Season | Apps | Goals | Apps | Goals | Apps | Goals | Apps | Goals |
| Venezuela | | Primera División | | Copa Venezuela | | Copa Libertadores | | Total | |
|---|---|---|---|---|---|---|---|---|---|
| Deportivo Lara | 2013–14 | 9 | 1 | 0 | 0 | 0 | 0 | 1 | 0 |
| Deportivo Lara | 2014–15 | 12 | 1 | 0 | 0 | 0 | 0 | 12 | 1 |
| Total | | 21 | 2 | 0 | 0 | 0 | 0 | 21 | 2 |
| Deportivo Táchira | 2015 | 3 | 0 | 0 | 0 | 0 | 0 | 3 | 0 |
| Deportivo Táchira | 2016 | 24 | 1 | 1 | 0 | 1 | 0 | 26 | 1 |
| Total | | 27 | 1 | 1 | 0 | 1 | 0 | 29 | 1 |
| Mineros de Guayana | 2017 | 14 | 0 | 0 | 0 | 0 | 0 | 14 | 0 |
| Total | | 14 | 0 | 0 | 0 | 0 | 0 | 14 | 0 |
| Total | Venezuela | 62 | 3 | 1 | 0 | 1 | 0 | 64 | 3 |
| Total | Career total | 62 | 3 | 1 | 0 | 1 | 0 | 64 | 3 |
