= Alan Liebeskind =

Venezuelan footballer (born 1985)

Personal information
- Full name: Alan José Liebeskind Díaz
- Date of birth: 7 January 1985 (age 41)
- Place of birth: Puerto Ordaz, Venezuela
- Height: 1.81 m (5 ft 11 1/2 in)
- Position: Goalkeeper

Team information
- Current team: Mineros de Guayana

Senior career*
Years	Team	Apps	(Gls)
2006–2007	Caracas FC	0	(0)
2007–2008	Zamora	33	(0)
2008–2010	Deportivo Italia	37	(0)
2010–2011	Deportivo Petare	26	(0)
2011–2014	ACD Lara	95	(0)
2014	Portuguesa	15	(0)
2015–2016	Deportivo Tachira	40	(0)
2017–2018	Deportivo La Guaira	65	(0)
2020–	Mineros de Guayana	1	(0)

International career^{‡}
2011–	Venezuela	1	(0)
- * Club domestic league appearances and goals as of 6 April 2012 ‡ National team caps and goals as of 6 April 2012

Alan José Liebeskind Díaz (born 7 January 1985) is a Venezuelan international footballer who plays for the Mineros de Guayana, as a goalkeeper.

== Club career ==
Born in Puerto Ordaz, Liebeskind has played club football for Caracas FC, Zamora FC, Deportivo Italia, Deportivo Petare, ACD Lara and Portuguesa FC.

== International career ==
He made his international debut for Venezuela in 2011.
