= Edixson González =

Venezuelan footballer (born 1990)

Personal information
- Date of birth: January 13, 1990 (age 36)
- Place of birth: Guasdualito, Venezuela
- Height: 1.82 m (6 ft 0 in)
- Position: Goalkeeper

Senior career*
Years	Team	Apps	(Gls)
2010–2015	Anzoátegui	62	(0)
2015–2017	Zulia	60	(0)
2017–2018	Carabobo	53	(0)
2019	Atlético Venezuela	3	(0)
2020	Mineros de Guayana	10	(0)
2022	Zulia	25	(0)
- * Club domestic league appearances and goals

Edixson González (born 13 January 1990) is a Venezuelan footballer as a goalkeeper.
