= Marlon Bastardo =

Venezuelan footballer (born 1990)

Personal information
- Date of birth: February 18, 1990 (age 36)
- Place of birth: Caracas, Venezuela
- Height: 1.72 m (5 ft 7 1/2 in)
- Position: Defender

Team information
- Current team: Universidad de Los Andes

Senior career*
Years	Team	Apps	(Gls)
2010–2011	Mineros de Guayana	9	(1)
2010–2011	Estudiantes de Mérida	10	(0)
2011–2012	Caracas FC	1	(0)
2011–2013	Deportivo La Guaira	22	(0)
2013–2014	Tucanes de Amazonas	27	(0)
2014–2017	Estudiantes de Mérida	79	(1)
2017	Portuguesa	8	(0)
2017	Trujillanos	11	(0)
2018–	Universidad de Los Andes	?	(?)
- * Club domestic league appearances and goals as of 26 May 2012

Marlon Bastardo (born 18 February 1990) is a Venezuelan footballer. His playing position is right-back.
