= Édgar Jiménez =

Venezuelan footballer (born 1984)

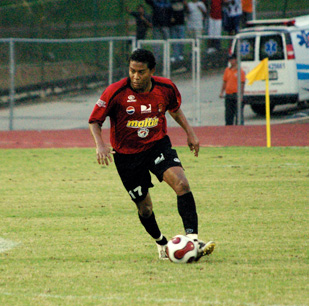

Personal information
- Full name: Édgar Hernán Jiménez
- Date of birth: 19 October 1984 (age 42)
- Place of birth: Puerto Ordaz, Venezuela
- Height: 1.80 m (5 ft 11 in)
- Position: Midfielder

Team information
- Current team: Mineros de Guayana

Senior career*
Years	Team	Apps	(Gls)
2003–2012	Caracas FC	215	(24)
2013–2015	Mineros de Guayana	58	(2)
2015	Carabobo	16	(1)
2018–	Mineros de Guayana	24	(1)
2019	→ Deportivo La Guaira (loan)	20	(0)

International career^{‡}
2006–	Venezuela	8	(0)
- * Club domestic league appearances and goals as of 01:39, 5 December 2019 (UTC) ‡ National team caps and goals as of 23 September 2011

Édgar Hernán Jiménez (born 19 October 1984) is a Venezuelan international footballer who plays for Mineros de Guayana, as a midfielder.

== Career ==
Jiménez has played for Caracas FC since 2003, winning the Venezuelan Primera División twice and the Copa Venezuela once.

He made his international debut for Venezuela in 2006.
