= Brayan Hurtado =

Venezuelan footballer (born 1999)

Personal information
- Full name: Brayan Yohangel Hurtado Cortesía
- Date of birth: June 21, 1999 (age 27)
- Place of birth: Ciudad Guayana, Venezuela
- Height: 1.84 m (6 ft 1/2 in)
- Position: Forward

Team information
- Current team: Deportes Antofagasta
- Number: 17

Youth career
- Mineros de Guayana

Senior career*
Years	Team	Apps	(Gls)
2015	Mineros de Guayana B		
2016–2021	Mineros de Guayana	82	(19)
2019	→ Portland Timbers 2 (loan)	26	(7)
2021	→ Cobresal (loan)	28	(12)
2022–	Deportes Antofagasta	57	(4)
2024	→ Universidad Central (loan)	25	(3)
2025	→ Miramar Misiones (loan)	7	(1)

International career^{‡}
2018	Venezuela U20	10	(0)
2021–	Venezuela	3	(0)
- * Club domestic league appearances and goals as of 31 January 2026 ‡ National team caps and goals as of 21:25, 27 January 2022 (UTC)

Brayan Yohangel Hurtado Cortesía (born 21 June 1999) is a Venezuelan footballer who plays as a forward for Deportes Antofagasta.

== Club career ==
In 2021, Hurtado moved to Chile and joined Cobresal.

In 2022, he switched to Deportes Antofagasta. In 2024, he was loaned Universidad Central in his homeland.

== International career ==
He made his debut for the Venezuela national football team on 14 October 2021 in a World Cup qualifier against Chile.

== Career statistics ==
=== Club ===
As of 04:02, 26 September 2021 (UTC).

Club	Season	League			Cup		Continental		Other		Total	
Club	Season	Division	Apps	Goals	Apps	Goals	Apps	Goals	Apps	Goals	Apps	Goals
Mineros de Guayana	2016	Venezuelan; Primera División	3	0	0	0	—		0	0	3	0
Mineros de Guayana	2017	Venezuelan; Primera División	33	9	6 (Note: Appearances in the Copa Venezuela)	3	—		0	0	39	12
Mineros de Guayana	2018	Venezuelan; Primera División	25	5	0	0	2	0	0	0	27	5
Mineros de Guayana	2019	Venezuelan; Primera División	1	0	0	0	—		0	0	1	0
Mineros de Guayana	2020	Venezuelan; Primera División	20	5	0	0	2	0	0	0	22	5
Mineros de Guayana	Total		82	19	6	3	4 (Note: Appearances in the Copa Sudamericana)	0	0	0	92	22
Portland Timbers 2 (loan)	2019	USL Championship	26	7	0	0	—		0	0	26	7
Cobresal (loan)	2021	Chilean Primera División	20	10	2	0	0	0	0	0	22	10
Career total			128	36	8	3	4	0	0	0	140	39

== Honours ==
Mineros de Guayana

- Copa Venezuela (1): 2017
