= Ángel Chourio =

Venezuelan footballer (born 1985)

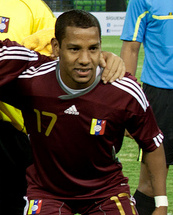

Personal information
- Full name: Ángel Meider Chourio
- Date of birth: May 4, 1985 (age 41)
- Place of birth: Maracay, Venezuela
- Height: 1.76 m (5 ft 9 1/2 in)
- Position: Attacking midfielder

Team information
- Current team: Aragua

Senior career*
Years	Team	Apps	(Gls)
2003–2006	Trujillanos		
2006–2008	Aragua	47	(4)
2008–2009	Unión Atlético Maracaibo	10	(1)
2009–2010	→ Deportivo Italia (loan)	7	(0)
2009–2011	Real Esppor	83	(19)
2012–2013	→ Deportivo Táchira (loan)	15	(2)
2013–2014	Mineros de Guayana	48	(3)
2015–2016	Aragua	60	(8)
2017	Trujillanos	16	(5)
2017	Atlético Venezuela	7	(0)
2022–	Aragua	6	(2)

International career^{‡}
2008–	Venezuela	19	(5)
- * Club domestic league appearances and goals as of 19 September 2012 ‡ National team caps and goals as of 1 January 2011

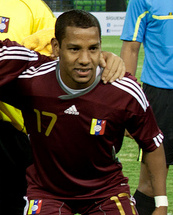

Ángel Meider Chourio (born 4 May 1985) is a Venezuelan footballer. He is an attacking midfielder and he currently plays for Aragua.

== International career ==
Chourio has played 19 times for the Venezuela national football team, where he has scored 5 goals.

=== International goals ===
Scores and results list Venezuela's goal tally first.

#	Date	Venue	Opponent	Score	Result	Competition
1	20 May 2010	Trinidad Stadium, Oranjestad, Aruba	Aruba	1–0	3–0	Friendly
2	20 May 2010	Trinidad Stadium, Oranjestad, Aruba	Aruba	2–0	3–0	Friendly
3	29 May 2010	Metropolitano de Mérida, Mérida, Venezuela	Canada	1–0	1–1	Friendly
4	7 October 2010	Estadio Ramón Tahuichi Aguilera, Santa Cruz, Bolivia	Bolivia	1–0	3–1	Friendly
5.	7 October 2010	Estadio Ramón Tahuichi Aguilera, Santa Cruz, Bolivia	Bolivia	3–0	3–1	Friendly
