= Hernán Velásquez =

Chilean constituent

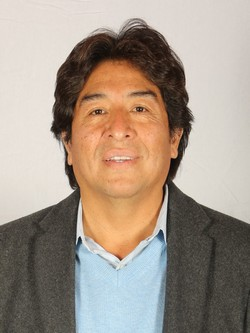

Member of the Constitutional Convention
- In office 4 July 2021 – 4 July 2022
- Constituency: 3rd District

Personal details
- Born: 29 October 1965 (age 60) Calama, Chile
- Party: Party for Democracy; Social Green Regionalist Federation
- Children: Three
- Relatives: Esteban Velásquez (brother)
- Education: University of Antofagasta (B.Sc)
- Occupation: Constituent
- Profession: Sociologist

Hernán Velásquez Núñez (born 29 October 1965) is a Chilean sociologist and politician of the Regionalist Green Social Federation (Federación Regionalista Verde Social).

He was elected as a member of the Constitutional Convention in 2021, representing the 3rd District of the Antofagasta Region. He previously served as a municipal councillor of Calama between 2008 and 2016.

In 2013, he helped in the presidential campaign of Marco Enríquez-Ominami.

== Professional career ==
He was born in Calama on 29 October 1965. He is the son of Irineo Velásquez Alvarado and Marta Núñez Romero.

He is the brother of Esteban Velásquez, former mayor of Calama and deputy for the Antofagasta Region, also affiliated with the Regionalist Green Social Federation.

Velásquez completed his primary and secondary education at Colegio Obispo Lezaeta in Calama. He later obtained a degree in Sociology.

== Political career ==
Velásquez is a member of the Regionalist Green Social Federation. He was previously affiliated with the Party for Democracy (PPD).

He served as a municipal councillor (concejal) of the commune of Calama for the 2008–2012 term as a member of the PPD. He was re-elected for the 2012–2016 term as an independent candidate. In the 2017 regional elections, he ran as an independent candidate for the Regional Council of El Loa (Antofagasta Region), but was not elected.

In the elections held on 15–16 May 2021, he ran as a candidate for the Constitutional Convention representing the 3rd District of the Antofagasta Region, as a member of the Regionalist Green Social Federation within the Apruebo Dignidad electoral pact. He obtained 3,946 votes, corresponding to 2.54% of the valid votes cast, and entered the Convention through the gender parity mechanism.
