= Matías Presentado =

Argentine footballer

Personal information
- Full name: Matías Isidoro Presentado
- Date of birth: 13 August 1992 (age 34)
- Place of birth: Mar del Plata, Argentina
- Height: 1.87 m (6 ft 2 in)
- Position: Centre-back

Team information
- Current team: Los Andes

Youth career
- Estudiantes

Senior career*
Years	Team	Apps	(Gls)
2014–2016	Estudiantes	5	(0)
2016	Cambaceres	13	(0)
2016–2017	Alvarado	12	(0)
2017	Caracas	5	(0)
2018	Crucero del Norte	12	(0)
2019–2021	Deportivo Madryn	32	(1)
2021	Gimnasia Concepción	20	(2)
2022–	Los Andes	13	(0)
- * Club domestic league appearances and goals as of 17:03, 7 August 2022 (UTC)

Matías Isidoro Presentado (born 13 August 1992) is an Argentine footballer who plays for Los Andes as a centre-back.

== Career ==
Presentado made his league debut in the 2014–15 season.
