= Franco Fasciana (footballer, born 1990) =

Venezuelan footballer

Personal information
- Full name: Franco José Fasciana Ordoñez
- Date of birth: May 9, 1990 (age 36)
- Place of birth: Barinas, Venezuela
- Height: 1.80 m (5 ft 11 in)
- Position: Midfielder

Youth career
- Monagas
- 2008–2009: Barcelona

Senior career*
| Years | Team | Apps | (Gls) |
| 2007–2008 | UA Maracaibo | 11 | (0) |

International career
| 2007 | Venezuela U-17 | 9 | (0) |
- * Club domestic league appearances and goals

Franco José Fasciana Ordoñez (born 9 May 1990) is a professional footballer from Venezuela. He played from 2007 to 2018, or 11 years.

== Career ==
Fasinana played for the teams Aragua, Zamora, Maraciabo, and in his last season for Estudiantes.
