= Francisco Pol Hurtado =

Venezuelan footballer (born 1987)

Personal information
- Full name: Francisco Emilio Pol Hurtado
- Date of birth: 17 September 1987 (age 39)
- Place of birth: Caracas, Venezuela
- Height: 1.73 m (5 ft 8 in)
- Positions: Attacking midfielder; winger

Senior career*
Years	Team	Apps	(Gls)
2006–2007	Paniliakos	14	(4)
2007–2009	Aias Salamina	31	(6)
2009–2010	Deportivo Italia	12	(4)
2010–2013	Panachaiki	67	(11)
2013–2015	Asteras Tripolis	9	(1)
2014–2015	→ Panegialios (loan)	33	(5)
2015–2016	AEL	25	(1)
2017–2020	Mineros de Guayana	96	(4)
2021	Deportivo La Guaira	17	(1)
2021-2022	Asteras Vlachioti	12	(0)
- * Club domestic league appearances and goals as of 17 March 2018

Francisco Pol Hurtado (born September 17, 1987, in Caracas) is a Venezuelan professional footballer as a midfielder.
