= José Piña =

Venezuelan footballer (born 1996)

Personal information
- Full name: José Gregorio Piña Flores
- Date of birth: 5 January 1996 (age 30)
- Place of birth: Coro, Venezuela
- Height: 1.76 m (5 ft 9 in)
- Position: Midfielder

Senior career*
Years	Team	Apps	(Gls)
2013–2014	Atlético Venezuela	8	(1)
2017	Unión Atlético Falcón		
2019	York9	0	(0)
- * Club domestic league appearances and goals as of 28 April 2019

José Gregorio Piña Flores (born 5 January 1996) is a Venezuelan professional footballer who plays as a midfielder.

== Club career ==
=== Atlético Venezuela ===
On 10 August 2013, Piña made his debut in the Venezuelan Primera División for Caracas-based club Atlético Venezuela. He made a further seven appearances that season and scored a goal in a 1–3 loss to Estudiantes de Mérida on 17 November 2013.

=== Unión Atlético Falcón ===
In 2017, Piña played for Venezuelan Segunda División side Unión Atlético Falcón and scored a goal in the Copa Venezuela against Academia Puerto Cabello.

=== York9 ===
On 28 April 2019, York9 FC revealed that Piña had signed with Canadian Premier League side, although the club had not made a formal announcement about his signing. After failing to appear for the team after his signing, on 27 June 2019 York9 coach Jimmy Brennan revealed that the club was continuing to sort out visa issues with Piña, which had prevented him from coming to Canada.
