= Yonder Silva =

Venezuelan footballer (born 1997)

Personal information
- Full name: Yonder Daniel Silva Vargas
- Date of birth: 23 March 1997 (age 29)
- Place of birth: Caracas, Venezuela
- Height: 1.81 m (5 ft 11 in)
- Position: Forward

Team information
- Current team: Marinhense
- Number: 30

Senior career*
Years	Team	Apps	(Gls)
2015–2017	Deportivo La Guaira	6	(0)
2017–2019	Estudiantes de Caracas	26	(2)
2019–2020	Metropolitanos	22	(2)
2020–2021	São João Ver	19	(2)
2021–2022	Florgrade	28	(6)
2022	Oliveira do Bairro	14	(7)
2023–	Marinhense	24	(10)
- * Club domestic league appearances and goals as of 23:12, 25 December 2023 (UTC)

Yonder Daniel Silva Vargas (born 23 March 1997) is a Venezuelan footballer who plays for A.C. Marinhense as a forward.
