= Jere Rodríguez =

Argentine footballer (born 1999)

Personal information
- Full name: Jeremias Martin Rodríguez Puch
- Date of birth: 15 May 1999 (age 27)
- Place of birth: Buenos Aires, Argentina
- Height: 1.71 m (5 ft 7 in)
- Position: Midfielder

Team information
- Current team: Gimnasia Mendoza

Youth career
- –2020: River Plate

Senior career*
Years	Team	Apps	(Gls)
2020–2021	River Plate	0	(0)
2020–2021	→ Académico Viseu (loan)	11	(0)
2022	San Martín SJ	18	(2)
2023–	Gimnasia Mendoza	76	(7)
- * Club domestic league appearances and goals as of 17:32, 8 August 2025 (UTC)

Jeremías Martin Rodríguez Puch (born 15 May 1999), usually Jere Rodríguez, is an Argentine professional footballer who plays as a midfielder for Gimnasia Mendoza.

== Career ==
As a youth player, Rodríguez joined the youth academy of River Plate, one of Argentina's most successful clubs, after a trial.

In 2020, he signed for Académico de Viseu in the Portuguese second division.

== Career statistics ==
As of 13 March 2021

Appearances and goals by club, season and competition
Club	Season	League			Cup		Continental		Other		Total	
Club	Season	Division	Apps	Goals	Apps	Goals	Apps	Goals	Apps	Goals	Apps	Goals
River Plate	2021	Argentine Primera División	0	0	0	0	0	0	0	0	0	0
Académico Viseu (loan)	2020–21	Liga Portugal 2	6	0	2 (Note: Appearances in the Taça de Portugal)	0	0	0	0	0	8	0
Career total			6	0	0	0	0	0	0	0	8	0
