= Mario Santilli =

Argentine footballer (born 1984)

Personal information
- Full name: Mario Alberto Santilli
- Date of birth: 27 July 1984 (age 42)
- Place of birth: Rosario, Argentina
- Height: 1.87 m (6 ft 2 in)
- Position: Goalkeeper

Team information
- Current team: Atlético Elortondo

Senior career*
Years	Team	Apps	(Gls)
2004–2009	Central Córdoba	102	(0)
2010	Coquimbo Unido	16	(0)
2011–2012	Sol de América	39	(0)
2013–2014	General Díaz	23	(0)
2014–2015	Rubio Ñu	23	(0)
2015	Deportivo Capiatá	19	(0)
2016	Aurora	8	(0)
2016–2017	Chaco For Ever	6	(0)
2017–2018	Mineros de Guayana	41	(0)
2019–2021	Deportivo La Guaira	71	(0)
2022–2023	Cafferatense	–	(–)
2024–	Atlético Elortondo	–	(–)
- * Club domestic league appearances and goals as of 10 September 2024

Mario Alberto Santilli (born 27 June 1984) is an Argentine footballer who plays as a goalkeeper for Atlético Elortondo in the Liga Venadense de Fútbol.

== Teams ==
- (Argentina) Central Córdoba de Rosario 2004–2009
- (Chile) Coquimbo Unido 2010
- (Paraguay) Sol de América 2011–2013
- (Paraguay) General Díaz 2013–2014
- (Paraguay) Rubio Ñu 2014–2015
- (Paraguay) Deportivo Capiatá 2015
- (Bolivia) Aurora 2016
- (Argentina) Chaco For Ever 2016–2017
- (Venezuela) Mineros de Guayana 2017–2018
- (Venezuela) Deportivo La Guaira 2019–2021
- (Argentina) Cafferatense 2022–2023
- (Argentina) Atlético Elortondo 2024–Present
