= José Luis Granados =

Venezuelan footballer (born 1986)

Personal information
- Full name: José Luis Granados Asprilla
- Date of birth: October 22, 1986 (age 40)
- Place of birth: Valera, Venezuela
- Height: 1.81 m (5 ft 11 1/2 in)
- Position: Defender

Team information
- Current team: Anzoátegui

Senior career*
Years	Team	Apps	(Gls)
2004–2006	Trujillanos		
2007–2008	Carabobo	13	(0)
2007–2010	Deportivo Táchira	57	(2)
2010–2017	Deportivo La Guaira	155	(12)
2017–2020	Mineros de Guayana	101	(9)
2021	Deportivo Táchira	27	(2)
2022	Hermanos Colmenarez	34	(2)
2023	Academia Puerto Cabello	27	(0)
2024	Portuguesa	7	(0)
2024	Zamora	19	(1)
2026-	Anzoátegui	10	(1)

International career^{‡}
2008–	Venezuela	17	(1)
- * Club domestic league appearances and goals as of 17 March 2018 ‡ National team caps and goals as of 7 June 2011

José Luis Granados Asprilla (born 22 October 1986 in Valera) is a Venezuelan footballer. He currently plays for Anzoátegui and Venezuela national football team, as a defender.
