= Mauricio Aubone =

Argentine footballer (born 1992)

Personal information
- Full name: Mauricio Alfredo Aubone Cabral
- Date of birth: February 25, 1992 (age 34)
- Place of birth: San Juan, Argentina
- Position: Forward

Team information
- Current team: Ferro De La Pampa
- Number: 10

Senior career*
Years	Team	Apps	(Gls)
2003–2012	Boca Juniors		
2013–2014	Club Atlético Douglas Haig		
2014–2016	Rangers de Talca		
2016–present	Hapoel Nazareth Illit		
present	Ferro De La Pampa		
- * Club domestic league appearances and goals

Mauricio Alfredo Aubone Cabral (born February 25, 1992, in San Juan, Argentina) is an Argentine footballer currently playing for Ferro De La Pampa currently he plays in the Torneo Federal A .
