= Franco Fasciana (footballer, born 1960) =

Venezuelan footballer

Personal information
- Date of birth: 8 March 1960 (age 66)

International career
Years	Team	Apps	(Gls)
1989–1991	Venezuela	5	(0)

Franco Fasciana (born 8 March 1960) is a Venezuelan footballer. He played in five matches for the Venezuela national football team from 1989 to 1991. He was also part of Venezuela's squad for the 1991 Copa América tournament.
