= Monagas S.C. =

Association football club in Venezuela

Monagas SC
- Full name: Monagas Sport Club
- Nicknames: Guerreros de Guarapiche; Los Guerreros Chaima; Los Azulgranas
- Founded: September 23, 1987; 39 years ago
- Ground: Estadio Monumental de Maturín
- Capacity: 51,796
- Chairman: Nicolás Fernández de Caleya
- Manager: Octavio Zambrano
- League: Liga FUTVE
- 2025: Liga FUTVE, 6th of 14
- Website: http://sportclubmonagas.com
Home colours	Away colours	Third colours

Monagas Sport Club is a Venezuelan professional football team competing at the top level, the Primera División Venezolana. It is based in Maturín. Their home stadium is the Estadio Monumental de Maturín. The club received the nickname of “Los Guerreros del Guarapiche” (The Warriors from the Guarapiche), because of the never giving up mentality of its players and the name of the river (River Guarapiche) which crosses the city where the team has its headquarters.

== History ==
Monagas Sport Club was founded on 23 September 1987 by Joaquín (Fariñas) da Silva, Ramón Ramírez, Enrique Polo, Rubén León, Francisco "Paco" Espinoza and Luis Enrique Rodríguez. Its first official match was against "Unión Deportivo Puerto la Cruz" on 22 May 1988; however the club had had friendly matches against the teams "Atlético Cumaná”, “Cachorros del Tigrito” and “Mariscales de Sucre”. The team started as a second division team and its first official league game, which it won with a final score of 4–0, was against the "Unión Deportivo Puerto La Cruz".

The team participated in the Venezuelan second division until 1990 when the club was promoted to the first division. Since then Monagas Sport Club have tried to remain in this division.

=== Crisis in the season 2006–07 ===
Monagas Sport Club obtained awful results in the season 2006–2007 of Venezuela's first division. As the consequence of this bad patch three previous coaches (Franco Fasciana, Del Valle Rojas and Bernardo Redín) had led the club before the arrival of Alí Cañas. Some football players resigned to the team before the conclusion of the tournament and Ramón Caballero, president of the club, gave up.

Monagas Sport Club finished in the relegation places at the end of the season, but the club won a reprieve when the Primera División Venezolana decided to expand from 10 to 18 teams, thus allowing the two teams in the relegation places to remain in the league.

=== 2017 ===
In 2017, Monagas participated in the Primera División and qualified to the knockout stage of the Torneo Apertura, finishing 6th in the regular season. In the quarter-finals, they defeated Zamora 6–2 on aggregate and went on to the semi-finals, where they defeated Carabobo on away goals after a 1–1 draw on aggregate. In the final, Monagas faced Caracas. The first leg was played at Maturín on 25 June, with a 1–0 win for the home side. On the second leg in Caracas on 2 July, Monagas lost 2–1, but won on away goals (2–2 on aggregate), securing Monagas' first title in short tournaments and their first qualification to the Copa Libertadores. Later, on the Serie Final, against Torneo Clausura champions Deportivo Lara, Monagas lost the first leg in Maturín on 13 December, 1–0, but won the second leg in Cabudare on 17 December, 2–0, becoming the Venezuelan champions for the first time, winning the Serie Final 2–1 on aggregate.

== Stadium ==
The Estadio Monumental de Maturín is a football stadium located in the city of Maturin, Monagas state. It is the biggest stadium in Venezuela with a capacity of 51,796 spectators. It is competing for the football matches that Monagas Sport Club home game. It was built to host the Copa America Venezuela 2007.

El Monumental was inaugurated on June 24, 2007, where they were the opening game between the Monagas Sport Club and Zamora Fútbol Club home team winning 2–0 with goals from Edder Farías.

Monagas Sport Club played from 1987 to 2007 at Estadio Alexander Botinni in Maturín.

== Sponsor ==
La Lotería de Oriente (a public lottery from Maturín) is the main sponsor of Monagas Sport Club. For last years the president of the lottery, Willy Farías, has been in charge of the presidency of the club.

== Controversy over the uniform, the logo and the name of the club ==
The colors of the Monagas Sport Club's uniform are blue and maroon. The uniform and crest are largely based on those of FC Barcelona. These colors were proposed by Francisco "Paco" Espinoza, a former vice-president of the club, in 1988. In 2006 Ramón Caballero, the former president of the team, and other members of the board of directors suggested the colors of the uniform, the logo and the name of the club should be changed. According to them, the uniform and crest should not copy a foreign club and the name of the team should be written in Spanish. Many supporters of Monagas Sport Club are opposed to this idea as they consider the red and maroon colors, crest and current name to be a part of the club's identity. The logo was finally changed in 2016.

== Honours ==
- Primera División: 1 (2017)
- Segunda División: 1 (2015)

== Performance in CONMEBOL competitions ==
- Copa Libertadores: 4 appearance

2018: Group stage
2022: Qualifying stage
2023: Group stage
2025: Second stage

- Copa Sudamericana: 4 appearances

2002: Second stage
2003: Preliminary round
2012: First stage
2019: First stage

== Players ==
=== Current first team squad ===
As of 14 March, 2026

Note: Flags indicate national team as defined under FIFA eligibility rules; some limited exceptions apply. Players may hold more than one non-FIFA nationality.

No.	Pos.	Nation	Player
2	DF	COL	Joyce Ríos
3	DF	VEN	Ricardo Rincones
5	MF	COL	Jean Colorado
7	FW	VEN	Fernando Basante
11	FW	VEN	Franklin González
12	GK	VEN	Thomas Riveros
13	DF	COL	Elvis Perlaza
14	MF	COL	Felipe Jaramillo
15	MF	VEN	Jesús Paz
16	MF	VEN	Édgar Carrión
18	MF	VEN	Jeferson Caraballo
20	MF	VEN	Henrry Díaz

No.	Pos.	Nation	Player
21	DF	PAN	Richard Peralta
26	MF	VEN	Dhylan Castillo
27	FW	VEN	Edder Farías
30	MF	VEN	Yerwin Sulbarán
31	DF	VEN	Marcos Maitán
32	FW	VEN	Cristian Ramírez
33	GK	VEN	Eduardo Lima
35	MF	ARG	Santiago Natera
38	MF	VEN	Saúl Asibe
43	FW	VEN	Ronald Rodríguez
55	FW	ECU	Maelo Rentería
77	MF	VEN	Leandro Rodríguez

== Presidents and managers ==
=== Presidential history ===
Monagas Sport Club has had numerous presidents over the course of its history, some of whom have been owners of the club while others have been honorary presidents. Here is a complete list of them.

Name	Years
Rubén León	1988-1992
Romualdo Romero	1993-1995
Jesús Salgado	1995-1996
Rafael Castellín Osuna	1997
Claudio González	2000-2001
Roicis Pérez	2001-2003
Antonio del Moral	2003-2004
Antonio Núñez	2004
Manuel Villalba	2005
Ramón Caballero	2005-2006
Nelson Rodríguez	2006-2009
Eduardo Pinto	2010
Willy Farias	2010-2011
Darwin Ágreda	2012
Gustavo Mendiri	2013-2014
Manuel Villalba	2014-2016
José González Espín	2016-2017
Nicolás Fernández	2017-present

=== Managerial history ===
Below is a list of Monagas SC coaches from 1987 until the present day.

Name	Nationality	Years
Joaquín "Fariñas" da Silva	(Brazil)	1987
Alexander "Titi"	(Venezuela)	
Gilberto Viana	(Brazil)	1990
Bejuma	(Venezuela)	
Victor Pignanelli	(Uruguay)	1992
Luís Fernández	(Venezuela)	
Antonio Mejías	(Colombia)	
Radamel García	(Colombia)	
Manuel Contreras	(Venezuela)	2001
Eduardo Borrero	(Colombia)	2001–02
Luís Mendoza	(Venezuela)	2003
Daniel Lanata	(Argentina)	2003
Alí Cañas	(Venezuela)	2003–05
Franco Fasciana	(Venezuela)	2005
Eduardo Borrero	(Colombia) (Venezuela)	2005–06
Franco Fasciana	(Venezuela)	2006
Del Valle Rojas	(Venezuela)	2006
Bernardo Redín	(Colombia)	2006–07
Alí Cañas	(Venezuela)	2007
Dario Martinez	(Venezuela)	2008
Horacio Matuszyck	(Argentina)	2008
Manuel Plasencia	(Spain) (Venezuela)	2008–09
Alí Cañas	(Venezuela)	2010–11
Eduardo Borrero	(Colombia) (Venezuela)	March 30, 2011–
