= Margarita F.C. =

Venezuelan football club

Margarita FC
- Full name: Margarita Fútbol Club
- Founded: 2011
- Ground: Estadio Ciudad, Pampatar, Nueva Esparta, Venezuela
- Capacity: 4,500
- Chairman: Leonel Cannelloni
- League: Venezuelan Segunda División
Home colours	Away colours

Margarita Fútbol Club is a Venezuelan football team based in Pampatar, Nueva Esparta. Margarita currently play in the Venezuelan Segunda División, the second division in Venezuelan football. The club was founded in 2011, and plays their home games at Estadio Ciudad, a 4,500 seat stadium in Pampatar.

== History ==
Margarita was founded as an initiative of current club president, Leonel Cannelloni. Cannelloni founded the club in 2011.

== Crest ==
The club's crest co consists of two quarters: a background of golden rays alternated by contrasts with the initials of the club. The lower half is presented in half-contrasting vertical blue. The low half contains a wreath which is dedicated the Virgen del Valle. The three stars symbolize the three islands that make up the state of Nueva Esparta ( Margarita, Coche and Cubagua ) .
