= Deportivo Anzoátegui S.C. =

Venezuelan football club

Deportivo Anzoátegui
- Full name: Deportivo Anzoátegui Sport Club
- Nickname(s): El Acorazado Oriental, Aurirojos, El Depor
- Founded: 9 November 2002; 22 years ago
- Dissolved: 2019
- Ground: Estadio José Antonio Anzoátegui; Puerto La Cruz, Venezuela
- Capacity: 37,485
- Chairman: Lisandro Altieri
- Manager: José González
- League: Primera División Venezolana
- 2017: 12th, aggregate table
Home colours	Away colours

Deportivo Anzoátegui Sport Club was a professional football club based in Puerto La Cruz, Anzoátegui. Founded in 2002, the club earned its promotion to the Venezuelan 1st division in 2007. They won the Copa de Venezuela in 2008, and were dissolved in 2019.

== History ==
The club was founded on 9 November 2002 by Juan Pereira, starting in the third tier of Venezuelan football. In this first season they finished unbeaten, winning the division and gaining promotion.

They participated in the Venezuelan Second Division for four seasons, winning promotion at the end of the 2006–07 season when the Venezuelan Premier Division expanded from 10 to 18 teams.

In 2008, they won the Copa Venezuela by defeating Estudiantes de Mérida in the final, winning 3–1 on aggregate with goals from Alexander Rondon, Emerson Panigutti and Nicolás Massia.

== Colours and Badge ==
The team plays in the colours of yellow and red. The club crest contains an outline of the state of Anzoátegui where the club is based, the year the club was formed as well as a star to commemorate their (at present) only league championship in the 3rd division

== Stadium ==
The club plays their home games at Estadio José Antonio Anzoátegui in the city of Puerto La Cruz. It was built specially for the Copa America 2007 on the site of the previous stadium.

== Players ==
=== Current squad ===
Current squad of Deportivo Anzoátegui:

No.		Position	Player
1	VEN	GK	Richard Ruiz
2	VEN	DF	William Díaz
3	VEN	DF	Diego Araguainamo
5	VEN	MF	Manuel Cuarez
6	VEN	DF	Jonny Mirabal
8	VEN	MF	José David Moreno
9	VEN	FW	Alexander Rondon
11	VEN	MF	Yorwin Lobo
12	VEN	GK	Edixson González

No.		Position	Player
13	VEN	DF	Juan Fuenmayor
14	VEN	DF	Edgar Mendoza
15	VEN	MF	Enmanuel Calzadilla
16	VEN	MF	Jesús Hernández
17	VEN	FW	Manuel Arteaga
19	VEN	MF	Ronald Giraldo
21	VEN	MF	Robert Hernández
22	VEN	FW	Junior Marcano
42	VEN	MF	rivero Goerarro

== Achievements ==
- Segunda División Venezolana: 2

2004 (C), 2007 (A)

- Tercera División Venezolana: 1

2003

- Copa de Venezuela: 2

2008, 2012

== Performance in CONMEBOL competitions ==
- Copa Libertadores: 3 appearances

2009: Preliminary Round
2013: Preliminary Round
2014:

- Copa Sudamericana: 3 appearances

2009: First Round
2011: Second Round
2013: First Round

== Records ==
- Biggest Home win: 10–0 vs Atlético Venezuela (27/4/2011)
- Biggest Away win: 7–1 vs Caroní (7/11/2010)

== Former managers ==
- (Uruguay) Carlos Maria Ravel (2002–03)
- (Venezuela) René Torres (2003)
- (Argentina) Daniel Lanata (2003–04)
- (Argentina) Miguel Oswaldo González (2004–05)
- (Venezuela) Félix Gutierrez (2005)
- (Argentina) Daniel Lanata (2005)
- (Argentina) (Venezuela) Carlos Horacio Moreno (2005–06)
- (Venezuela) Stalin Rivas (2007)
- (Venezuela) César Farías (2007)
- (Venezuela) Marcos Mathías (2007–08)
- (Venezuela) José Hernández (2009)
- (Venezuela) Daniel Farías (March 13, 2009 – Dec 31, 2012)
- (Venezuela) Juvencio Betancourt (Dec 12, 2012–14)
- (Venezuela) Ruberth Morán (2014)
- (Argentina) Nicolás Larcamón (201?–)
