= A.C.C.D. Mineros de Guayana =

Venezuelan football club

Mineros de Guayana
- Full name: Asociación Civil Club Deportivo Mineros de Guayana
- Nicknames: Los Negriazules (The Black and Blues); La Pandilla del Sur (The Southern Gang); La Leyenda del Sur
- Founded: 20 November 1981; 44 years ago
- Ground: Polideportivo Cachamay
- Capacity: 41,600
- Chairman: Bob Kelly Abreu
- Manager: Jesús Ortiz
- League: Venezuelan Segunda División
- 2023: Primera División, 15th of 15 (relegated)
- Website: www.accdminerosdeguayana.com
Home colours	Away colours	Third colours

Asociación Civil Club Deportivo Mineros de Guayana, known as Mineros de Guayana or simply Mineros, is a professional football club based in Puerto Ordaz, Venezuela.

== History ==
The Colegio Loyola Gumilla's field, located in Puerto Ordaz, was used in football matches. The people who played at the field decided to found a football club. On 11 November 1981, the club was founded as Club Deportivo Mineros de Guayana.

On 20 November 1981, the club's foundation constitutive act was signed.

On 3 January 1982, the club played its first match, against Villa Colombia FC, a Guayana's amateur club. Mineros won 2-0, both goals scored by José Pacheco.

On 5 September 1982, the club won the Venezuelan Segunda División, being promoted to the following year's first division.

In 1989, the club won the first Venezuelan Primera División.

== Crest and colours ==
The club's logo is composed of a geometrical figure, which is a carbon diamond crystal zoomed millions of times with a microscope. The club's colors are blue and black.

== Stadium ==
Mineros plays their home matches at CTE Cachamay, which has a maximum capacity of 41,600 people. It was 1 of the 9 venues of the Copa America 2007, for this, US$160,000 were invested for the expansion of the stadium. The stadium has multiple uses, like a special kids area, an indoor gym, basketball and volleyball courts, a racing track, ten media station booths, a commercial center, movie theaters and three enormous parking lots. The stadium is surrounded by the river Caroní and the waterfall of the Cachamay Park.

== Players ==
=== Current squad ===
As of 13 December 2020

Note: Flags indicate national team as defined under FIFA eligibility rules; some limited exceptions apply. Players may hold more than one non-FIFA nationality.

No.	Pos.	Nation	Player
1	GK	VEN	Alan Liebeskind
1	GK	VEN	Daniel Iemma
2	DF	VEN	Adrian Martinez
3	DF	VEN	Karin Saab
4	DF	COL	Luis Vergara
5	DF	VEN	Julio Machado
6	FW	VEN	Alfredo Mendoza
7	MF	VEN	Argenis Gómez
8	DF	VEN	Johan Micolta
8	MF	VEN	Édgar Jiménez
9	FW	VEN	Richard Blanco
10	MF	VEN	Pierangelo Pagnano
10	MF	VEN	Michael Covea
11	FW	VEN	Darwin Gómez
12	GK	VEN	Edgar Pérez
13	DF	VEN	Anthony Matos
14	DF	VEN	Danny Hernández
16	FW	VEN	Gustavo Páez

No.	Pos.	Nation	Player
16	FW	VEN	Pedro Zaragoza
17	MF	VEN	Ely Valderrey
18	MF	VEN	Nelson Hernández
19	MF	VEN	Francisco Pol Hurtado
19	MF	VEN	Andrés Godoy
20	MF	VEN	Arnold López
20	DF	VEN	José González
21	FW	CRC	Mynor Escoe
22	DF	VEN	Jorbert Trillo
22	DF	VEN	Ángel Faria
23	MF	VEN	Josmar Zambrano
24	DF	VEN	Brayan Hurtado
25	FW	VEN	Andres Saavedra
26	GK	VEN	Edixson González
28	DF	VEN	Christian Gómez
30	FW	VEN	Víctor Navas
30	DF	VEN	José Luis Granados

== Former managers ==
- (Argentina) Mario Kempes (10 Feb 1997 – 23 Feb 1998)
- (Colombia) Armando Londoño
- (Colombia) César Maturana
- (Venezuela) César Farías (Oct 2005–07)
- (Colombia) Álvaro Gómez (15 June 2007 – 24 Dec 2007)
- (Venezuela) Stalin Rivas (27 Dec 2007 – 14 April 2008)
- (Venezuela) Alí Cañas (17 March 2008–Sept 23, 2008)
- (Venezuela) Del Valle Rojas (Sept 24, 2008–6 March 2009)
- (Venezuela) José Hernández (12 March 2009 – 1 March 2010)
- (Uruguay) (Venezuela) Carlos Maldonado (4 July 2010 – 20 Nov 2012)
- (Venezuela) Richard Páez (28 Nov 2012 – 18 Jan 2014)

== Honours ==
- Venezuelan Primera División
  - Winners (1): 1989
- Venezuelan Segunda División
  - Winners (1): 1982
- Copa Venezuela
  - 'Winners (3): 1984, 2011, 2017

== South American record ==
- Copa Libertadores: 4 appearances

1990: Group stage
1997: Group stage
2005: Preliminary round
2008: First stage

- Copa Sudamericana: 4 appearances

2005: Preliminary round
2006: Preliminary round
2012: Second stage
2013: TBD

- Copa CONMEBOL: 1 appearance

1995: Quarter-finals
