= Manuel Arteaga =

Venezuelan footballer (born 1994)

Personal information
- Full name: Manuel Alejandro Arteaga Rubianes
- Date of birth: 17 June 1994 (age 32)
- Place of birth: Maracaibo, Venezuela
- Height: 1.85 m (6 ft 1 in)
- Position: Forward

Team information
- Current team: Las Vegas Lights FC
- Number: 9

Youth career
- 2004–2008: U.A. Maracaibo
- 2008–2010: Zulia

Senior career*
Years	Team	Apps	(Gls)
2010–2016	Zulia	80	(33)
2012–2013	→ Parma (loan)	0	(0)
2013–2014	→ Dep. Anzoategui (loan)	20	(5)
2016–2017	Palermo	0	(0)
2016	→ Hajduk Split (loan)	2	(0)
2016–2017	→ The Strongest (loan)	11	(1)
2017	Seraing United	6	(1)
2017–2018	Deportivo La Guaira	33	(15)
2018–2019	Arouca	18	(1)
2019–2021	Zamora	29	(12)
2021–2022	Indy Eleven	53	(15)
2023	Phoenix Rising	37	(15)
2024–2025	Tampa Bay Rowdies	63	(26)
2026–	Las Vegas Lights	27	(3)

International career^{‡}
	Venezuela U17	3	(2)
2012–	Venezuela U20	4	(0)
2011–	Venezuela	3	(0)
- * Club domestic league appearances and goals as of 10:18, 9 November 2026 (UTC)~ ‡ National team caps and goals as of 16:13, 8 November 2024 (UTC)

Manuel Alejandro Arteaga Rubianes (born 17 June 1994) is a Venezuelan professional footballer who plays as a forward for Las Vegas Lights FC in the USL Championship.

== Club career ==
=== Zulia ===
Arteaga began his career with Zulia FC. where he made his debut on 15 August 2010 in a 4–1 victory over Atlético El Vigía. He scored his first senior goal against Deportivo Petare on 20 February 2011, coming on as a 69th minute sub he scored in the 85th minute to seal a 1–0 victory for his team. On 30 October 2011, Arteaga scored a 67th-minute equaliser (2–2) against Estudiantes de Mérida it ended 2–2. He scored in the 8th minute beating Trujillanos FC 1–0 on 6 November 2011. Arteaga scored the only goal in the 1-0 match v Anzoátegui on 15 April 2012, he also scored the first goal in the 18th minute against Yaracuyanos FC on 22 April 2012 where his team won 2–1 away from home.

In January 2011 he went on trial with Liverpool but they declined to sign him. In May 2011 he went on trial with Fiorentina but they did not sign him after the period expired.

=== Parma ===
On 31 August 2012, Arteaga signed a loan deal with Parma.

=== Palermo ===
On 7 December 2015, Italian Serie A club U.S. Città di Palermo announced the signing of the promising Venezuelan, for €800,000.

=== Hajduk Split ===
Arteaga signed a loan deal with Croatian football club Hajduk Split on 25 January 2016 and made his debut as a substitute against NK Slaven Belupo in February that year. On 20 February 2016, he played against NK Lokomotiva in an away defeat where he was substituted at halftime. After that game, Artega did not play for Hajduk anymore for reasons unknown. On 7 June 2016, his loan spell with Hajduk Split was terminated.

=== Indy Eleven ===
On 11 January 2021, USL Championship club Indy Eleven announced that they had signed Arteaga. On 7 June 2022, Arteaga was named player of the week for Week 13 of the 2022 USL Championship season. He was released by Indy Eleven on 30 November 2022, following the conclusion of the 2022 season.

=== Phoenix Rising FC ===
Arteaga signed with Phoenix Rising FC on 13 December 2022. On 1 April 2023, he scored a brace in a 2–2 draw against San Diego Loyal.

=== Las Vegas Lights FC ===
He signed with Las Vegas Lights FC on December 10, 2025.

== International career ==
On 13 March 2011 in the Sudamericano U-17 2011. Arteaga scored twice away to Brazil U-17 in the 5th and 8th minute, the score ended 4–3 to Venezuela. He made his full international debut as a Substitute on 7 August 2011 in a friendly under César Farías against El Salvador, losing the match 2–1.

== Career statistics ==
=== Club ===
As of match played 22 July 2017

Appearances and goals by club, season and competition
Club	Season	League			Cup		Continental		Total	
Club	Season	Division	Apps	Goals	Apps	Goals	Apps	Goals	Apps	Goals
Zulia FC	2010–11	Venezuelan Primera División	7	1	0	0	–		7	1
Zulia FC	2011–12	Venezuelan Primera División	18	4	0	0	–		18	4
Zulia FC	2012–13	Venezuelan Primera División	1	0	0	0	–		1	0
Zulia FC	2013–14	Venezuelan Primera División	16	5	0	0	–		16	5
Zulia FC	2014–15	Venezuelan Primera División	17	6	0	0	–		17	6
Zulia FC	2015	Venezuelan Primera División	21	17	0	0	–		21	17
Zulia FC	Total		80	33	0	0	0	0	80	33
Deportivo Anzoátegui (loan)	2013–14	Venezuelan Primera División	10	4	0	0	2 (Note: Appearances in the Copa Libertadores)	1	12	5
Deportivo Anzoátegui (loan)	2014–15	Venezuelan Primera División	10	1	0	0	2 (Note: Appearances in the Copa Sudamericana)	1	12	2
Deportivo Anzoátegui (loan)	Total		20	5	0	0	4	2	24	7
Palermo	2015–16	Serie A	0	0	0	0	–		0	0
Hajduk Split (loan)	2015–16	Prva HNL	2	0	0	0	0	0	2	0
The Strongest (loan)	2016–17	Liga de Fútbol Profesional Boliviano	11	1	0	0	0	0	11	1
Seraing	2016–17	Belgian First Amateur Division	6	1	0	0	–		6	1
Deportivo La Guaira	2017	Venezuelan Primera División	2	0	0	0	–		2	0
Career total			121	40	0	0	4	2	125	42

=== International ===
Venezuela national team
Year	Apps	Goals
2011	1	0
2015	2	0
Total	3	0
