= Yeferson Soteldo =

Venezuelan footballer (born 1997)

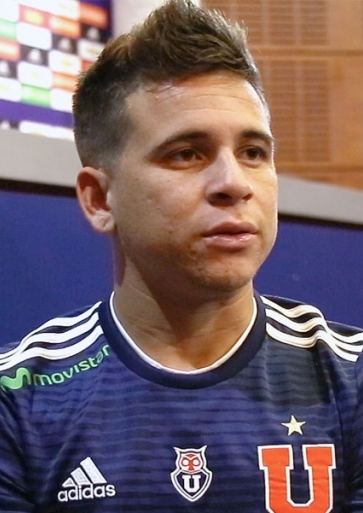
- Soteldo with Universidad de Chile in 2018

Personal information
- Full name: Yeferson Julio Soteldo Martínez
- Date of birth: 30 June 1997 (age 29)
- Place of birth: Acarigua, Venezuela
- Height: 1.57 m (5 ft 2 in)
- Positions: Winger; attacking midfielder

Team information
- Current team: Fluminense
- Number: 30

Youth career
- 2011–2013: Caracas

Senior career*
Years	Team	Apps	(Gls)
2013–2016	Zamora	84	(21)
2017–2018	Huachipato	22	(2)
2018	→ Universidad de Chile (loan)	26	(5)
2019–2021	Santos	77	(15)
2021–2022	Toronto FC	24	(3)
2022–2023	Tigres UANL	19	(1)
2022–2023	→ Santos (loan)	18	(0)
2023–2025	Santos	32	(1)
2024–2025	→ Grêmio (loan)	31	(6)
2025–	Fluminense	31	(2)

International career^{‡}
2017	Venezuela U20	15	(3)
2020	Venezuela U23	4	(2)
2016–	Venezuela	53	(4)
Medal record
Men's football
Representing Venezuela
FIFA U-20 World Cup
Runner-up	2017
South American U-20 Championship
Third place	2017
- * Club domestic league appearances and goals as of 03:21, 1 June 2026 (UTC) ‡ National team caps and goals as of 23:44, 9 September 2025 (UTC)

Yeferson Julio Soteldo Martínez (pronounced [ɟʝefeɾˈson soˈteldo]; born 30 June 1997) is a Venezuelan professional footballer who plays for Campeonato Brasileiro Série A club Fluminense and the Venezuela national team. Although he mainly plays as a left winger, he can also play as an attacking midfielder.

== Club career ==
=== Zamora ===
Soteldo was born in Acarigua, in the Venezuelan state of Portuguesa, and as a teen moved to Caracas. After a difficult time in Caracas, his early coach in Caracas FC invited him to join Zamora FC at just 16 years old. On 16 September 2013, he made his first team debut (also his Primera División debut), coming on as a late substitute for Jhon Murillo in a 0–0 home draw against Atlético Venezuela.

Soteldo became a regular starter for Zamora from the 2014–15 season onwards, and scored his first professional goal on 28 January 2015, netting the opener in a 4–2 home win against Carabobo. On 20 May 2015, he scored a brace in a 3–2 home defeat of Mineros de Guayana. In the 2015 campaign, he played a key role by scoring twelve goals as his side lifted the Primera División trophy.

=== Huachipato ===
On 20 December 2016, Soteldo joined Chilean Primera División side Huachipato for a fee of € 1.5 million. He made his debut abroad on 17 February, replacing Leonardo Povea in a 2–1 home success over Universidad de Chile.

Soteldo scored his first goal abroad on 22 July 2017, netting his team's third in a 4–0 home routing of Deportes Valdivia, for the year's Copa Chile.

==== Universidad de Chile (loan) ====
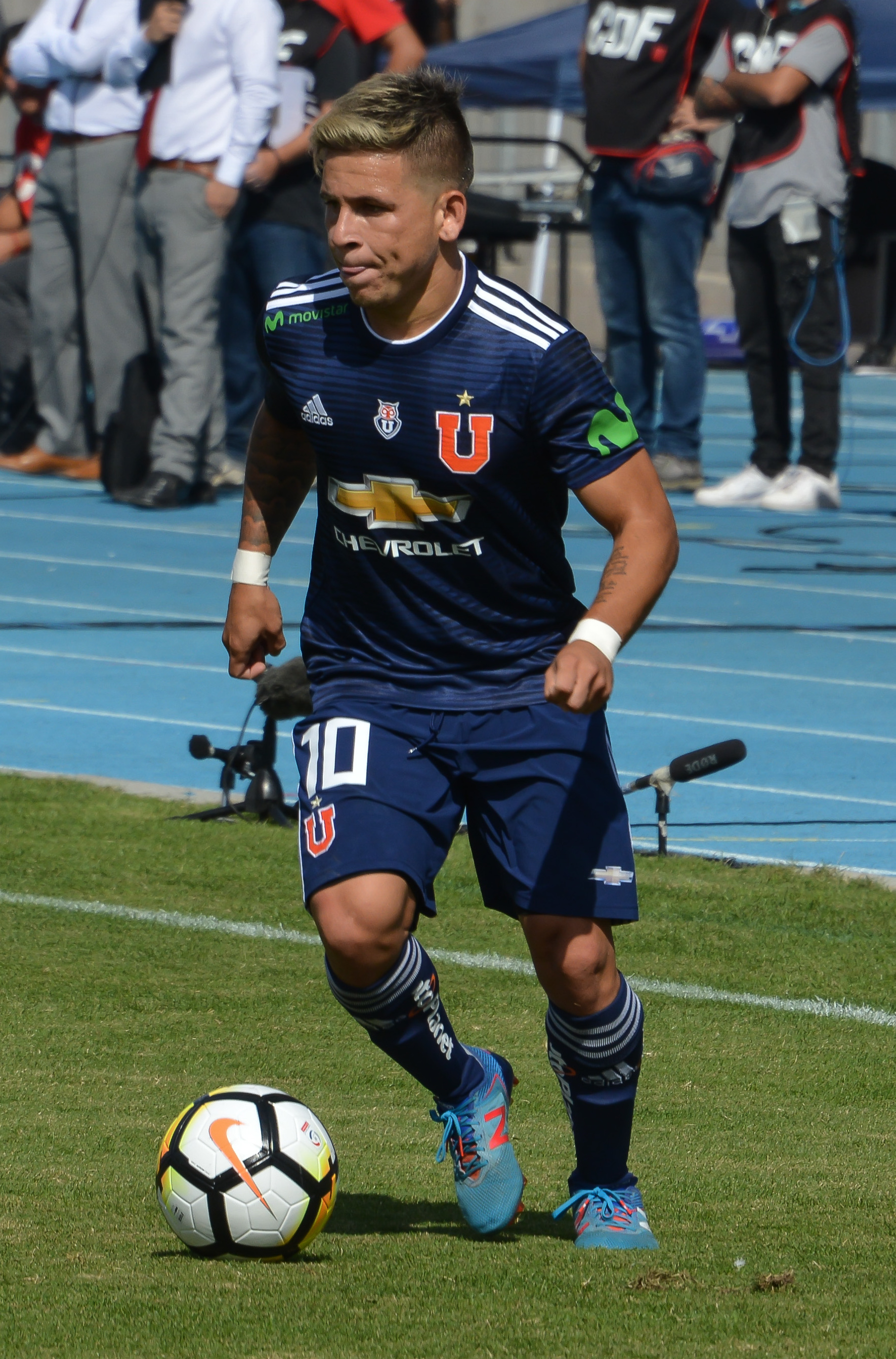
Soteldo in action for Universidad de Chile in 2018

On 11 January 2018, Soteldo joined fellow top tier side Universidad de Chile on a one-year loan deal. La U paid US$ 1.5 million fee for the loan, with a buyout clause of 50% of his rights set on US$3.5 million. A regular starter, he contributed with 26 league appearances and five goals.

=== Santos ===
On 12 January 2019, Soteldo agreed to a four-year contract with Série A side Santos FC. He made his debut for the club twelve days later, replacing Felippe Cardoso and scoring his team's third in a 4–0 away routing of São Bento, for the year's Campeonato Paulista.

Soteldo soon became an undisputed starter under Jorge Sampaoli, scoring two braces in the month of November, against Botafogo (4–1 home win) and Goiás (3–0 away win). On 11 February 2020, he renewed his contract until December 2023.

=== Toronto FC ===
On 24 April 2021, Soteldo's club Santos FC confirmed that Soteldo had been sold to MLS side Toronto FC for a fee of $6.5 million. The fee covers 75% of his playing rights and enables Santos FC to avoid a transfer ban imposed by FIFA due to them failing to pay Huachipato back in 2019. He made his debut on May 8, in a substitute appearance, against the New York Red Bulls. On July 7, Soteldo scored his first goal for Toronto against the New England Revolution.

=== Tigres ===
On 31 January 2022, Soteldo joined Liga MX club Tigres UANL in a transfer with Carlos Salcedo coming to Toronto in exchange.

=== Return to Santos ===
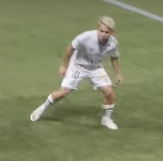
Soteldo with Santos in 2022

On 11 August 2022, Santos announced the return of Soteldo on loan until July 2023, with a buyout clause. However, he struggled with injuries during his second spell, spending three months sidelined due to a shoulder injury in the early stages of the 2023 season.

On 16 June 2023, Santos announced that the club exercised the buyout clause on Soteldo's contract, purchasing 50% of his economic rights, and with the player signing a contract until June 2027. However, he was separated from the first team squad on 1 July due to indiscipline problems, but still officially signed his permanent contract six days later.

On 6 August 2023, one day after the dismissal of head coach Paulo Turra, Soteldo was reinstated in the first team squad of Santos. He scored his first goal after returning on 1 October, netting his team's fourth in a 4–1 home routing of Vasco da Gama; in that same match, he also stepped on the ball with both feet in an attempt to make a stunt, which led to a subsequent on-field brawl.

==== Loan to Grêmio ====
On 22 December 2023, after Santos' first-ever relegation, Soteldo moved to Grêmio on loan for the 2024 season.

==== 2025 season ====
Back to Santos for the 2025 season, Soteldo renewed his contract with the club until December 2028 on 12 February of that year.

=== Fluminense ===
On 10 June 2025, Soteldo moved to Fluminense on a three-and-a-half-year contract. This move saw him reunite with former Grêmio coach, Renato Gaúcho.

== International career ==
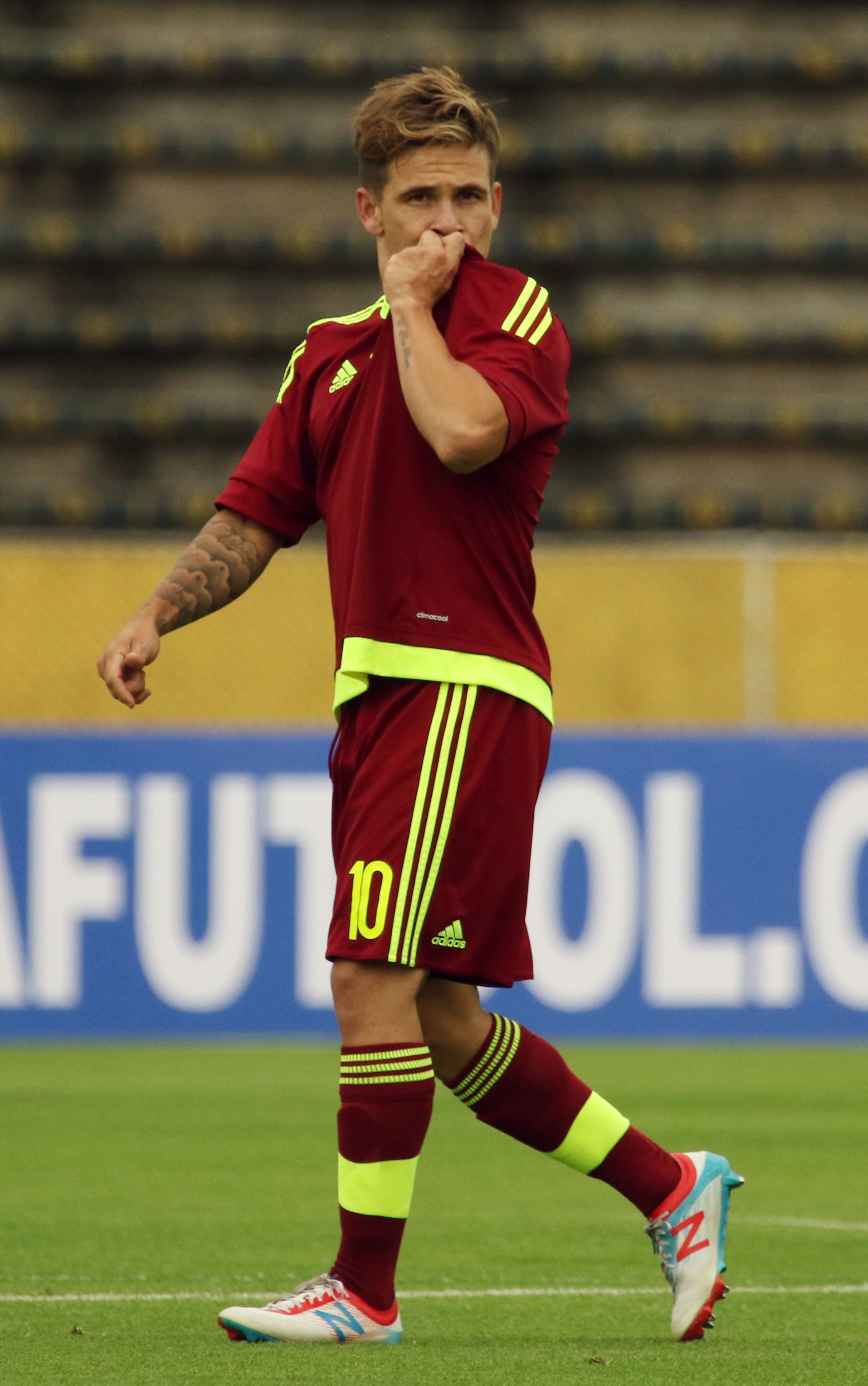
Soteldo playing for the Venezuela under-20 national team in 2017

On 19 January 2016, Soteldo was called up by Venezuela national team manager Noel Sanvicente for a friendly against Costa Rica. He made his full international debut on 2 February, playing the full 90 minutes in the 1–0 win in Barinas.

Soteldo was initially out of Rafael Dudamel's final 23-man list for the 2019 Copa América, but was called up on 8 June to replace injured Adalberto Peñaranda.

== Style of play ==
Standing at 5 feet 2 inches tall, Soteldo is a diminutive and energetic forward, who is known for his flair and pace on the ball, as well as his playmaking ability and dribbling skills; although primarily a left winger, he is also capable of playing as an attacking midfielder. Upon signing for Toronto FC in 2021, Neil Davidson of The Globe and Mail described Soteldo as a "dangerous winger who likes to take on defenders and befuddle them with his moves, Soteldo can make goals and score them." Toronto GM Ali Curtis also described him with the following words: "He’s a really shifty player. Elusive. Good in tight spaces."

== Career statistics ==
=== Club ===
As of match played 31 May 2026

Appearances and goals by club, season and competition
Club	Season	League			State league (Note: Includes Campeonato Paulista, Campeonato Gaúcho, Campeonato Carioca)		National cup (Note: Includes Copa Venezuela, Copa Chile, Copa do Brasil, Canadian Championship)		Continental		Other		Total	
Club	Season	Division	Apps	Goals	Apps	Goals	Apps	Goals	Apps	Goals	Apps	Goals	Apps	Goals
Zamora	2013–14	Venezuelan Primera División	3	0	—		0	0	0	0	—		3	0
Zamora	2014–15	Venezuelan Primera División	27	3	—		0	0	5 (Note: Appearances in Copa Libertadores)	0	—		32	3
Zamora	2015	Venezuelan Primera División	21	12	—		3	0	2 (Note: Appearance(s) in Copa Sudamericana)	1	—		26	13
Zamora	2016	Venezuelan Primera División	33	6	—		1	1	4	1	—		38	8
Zamora	Total		84	21	—		4	1	11	2	—		99	24
Huachipato	2016–17	Chilean Primera División	8	0	—		0	0	—		—		8	0
Huachipato	2017	Chilean Primera División	14	2	—		7	4	—		—		21	6
Huachipato	Total		22	2	—		7	4	—		—		29	6
Universidad de Chile (loan)	2018	Chilean Primera División	26	5	—		6	2	5	0	—		37	7
Santos	2019	Série A	32	9	9	1	8	1	2	1	—		51	12
Santos	2020	Série A	24	4	9	1	2	0	11	2	—		46	7
Santos	2021	Série A	0	0	3	0	0	0	5	1	—		8	1
Santos	Total		56	13	21	2	10	1	18	4	—		105	20
Toronto FC	2021	Major League Soccer	24	3	—		2	1	0	0	—		26	4
Tigres UANL	2021–22	Liga MX	16	1	—		—		0	0	—		16	1
Tigres UANL	2022–23	Liga MX	3	0	—		—		0	0	—		3	0
Tigres UANL	Total		19	1	—		—		0	0	—		19	1
Santos	2022	Série A	7	0	—		—		—		—		7	0
Santos	2023	Série A	22	1	4	0	2	0	4	0	—		32	1
Santos	2025	Série A	5	0	12	0	0	0	—		—		17	0
Santos	Total		34	1	16	0	2	0	4	0	—		56	1
Grêmio (loan)	2024	Série A	24	5	7	1	3	0	7	1	—		41	7
Fluminense	2025	Série A	17	2	—		3	0	1	0	1 (Note: Appearance in FIFA Club World Cup)	0	22	2
Fluminense	2026	Série A	12	0	2	0	0	0	5	0	—		19	0
Fluminense	Total		29	2	2	0	3	0	6	0	1	0	41	2
Career total			318	53	46	3	37	9	51	7	1	0	453	72

=== International ===
As of match played 9 September 2025

Appearances and goals by national team and year
National team	Year	Apps	Goals
Venezuela	2016	3	0
Venezuela	2017	3	0
Venezuela	2018	0	0
Venezuela	2019	9	1
Venezuela	2020	3	0
Venezuela	2021	5	1
Venezuela	2022	7	0
Venezuela	2023	8	2
Venezuela	2024	9	0
Venezuela	2025	6	0
Total		53	4

Scores and results list Venezuela's goal tally first, score column indicates score after each Soteldo goal.

List of international goals scored by Yeferson Soteldo
No.	Date	Venue	Opponent	Score	Result	Competition
1	19 November 2019	Panasonic Stadium Suita, Suita, Japan	Japan	4–0	4–1	2019 Kirin Challenge Cup
2	2 September 2021	Estadio Olímpico de la UCV, Caracas, Venezuela	Argentina	1–3	1–3	2022 FIFA World Cup qualification
3	15 June 2023	Audi Field, Washington, D.C., United States	Honduras	1–0	1–0	Friendly
4	17 October 2023	Estadio Monumental, Maturín, Venezuela	Chile	1–0	3–0	2026 FIFA World Cup qualification

== Honours ==
Zamora

- Venezuelan Primera División: 2013–14, 2015,^{[a]} 2016

Santos

- Campeonato Brasileiro Série A runner-up: 2019
- Copa Libertadores runner-up: 2020

Grêmio

- Campeonato Gaúcho: 2024

Venezuela U20

- FIFA U-20 World Cup runner-up: 2017
- South American Youth Football Championship third place: 2017

Venezuela

- Kirin Cup: 2019

Individual

- Venezuelan Primera División Team of the Year: Best Attacking Midfielder 2016
- Chilean Primera División Best Foreign Player: 2017
- Chilean Primera División Team of the Year: Best Left Winger 2017
- Chilean Primera División Team of the Year: Best Left Winger 2018
- Campeonato Paulista Team of the Year: 2020
- Copa Libertadores Best XI: 2020
- Best Left Winger in Brazil: 2020
- South America Team of the Year: 2020

== Notes ==
a. This edition was called Torneo de Adecuación, and should not be confused with the 2014–15 Venezuelan Primera División season. It served as a transitional tournament between the 'European' bi-annual format to the annual format.
