= 2015 Copa Venezuela =

Tournament details
- Country: Venezuela
- Dates: 8 July – 28 October 2015
- Teams: 37

Final positions
- Champions: Deportivo La Guaira (2nd title)
- Runners-up: Deportivo Lara

Tournament statistics
- Top goal scorer(s): Gustavo Britos (5 goals)

The 2015 Copa Venezuela was the 46th staging of the Copa Venezuela. The winner qualified for the 2016 Copa Sudamericana.

== First round ==
- Teams entering this round: 2 teams from Venezuelan Primera División and 12 teams from Venezuelan Segunda División.
- First legs: July 8, 21, 22; Second legs: July 15, 29.

Team 1	Agg.	Team 2	1st leg	2nd leg
Central & Oriental Group
Angostura FC	1–6	Petroleros de Anzoátegui	1–2	0–4
Universidad Central	1–1 (2–4 p)	Arroceros de Calabozo	1–0	0–1
Central & Occidental Group
Potros de Barinas	2–2 (a)	Llaneros de Guanare	1–2	1–0
Gran Valencia	1–2	Portuguesa FC	1–0	0–2
Academia Puerto Cabello	3–3 (a)	Yaracuyanos FC	1–1	2–2
REDI Colón	3–3 (a)	Deportivo JBL del Zulia	3–1	0–2
Atlético El Vigía	2–4	Ureña SC	1–2	1–2

== Second round ==
- Teams entering this round: 14 teams from Venezuelan Primera División, 7 teams from Venezuelan Segunda División.
- First legs: July 29, August 5; Second legs: August 5, 12, 13.

Team 1	Agg.	Team 2	1st leg	2nd leg
Central & Oriental Group
Monagas SC	5–3	Metropolitanos FC	3–1	2–2
Petroleros de Anzoátegui	1–6	Caracas FC	1–3	0–3
Margarita FC	0–5	Deportivo Anzoátegui	0–3	0–2
Diamantes de Guayana	0–5	Mineros de Guayana	0–1	0–4
Deportivo Petare	0–2	Aragua FC	0–0	0–2
Arroceros de Calabozo	0–2	Tucanes de Amazonas	0–0	0–2
Estudiantes de Caracas	1–2	Atlético Venezuela	0–0	1–2
Central & Occidental Group
Policía de Lara FC	1–2	Llaneros de Guanare	1–1	0–1
Ureña SC	0–6	Trujillanos FC	0–3	0–3
Unión Atlético Falcón	2–2 (a)	Zulia FC	0–1	2–1
Zamora FC	3–1	Atlético Socopó	3–1	0–0
Portuguesa FC	0–1	Deportivo Lara	0–1	0–0
Academia Puerto Cabello	4–4 (2–4 p)	Carabobo FC	3–1	1–3
Deportivo JBL del Zulia	1–2	Estudiantes de Mérida	1–1	0–1

== Round of 16 ==
- Teams entering this round: Deportivo La Guaira (2014 Copa Venezuela champion), Deportivo Táchira (2014–15 Venezuelan Primera División champion).
- First legs: August 19, 26; Second legs: August 26, September 2.

Team 1	Agg.	Team 2	1st leg	2nd leg
Central & Oriental Group
Aragua FC	1–2	Caracas FC	0–1	1–1
Atlético Venezuela	1–2	Deportivo La Guaira	1–1	0–1
Tucanes de Amazonas	2–2 (a)	Monagas SC	1–0	1–2
Mineros de Guayana	1–4	Deportivo Anzoátegui	1–2	0–2
Central & Occidental Group
Deportivo Lara	4–4 (a)	Trujillanos FC	1–2	3–2
Estudiantes de Mérida	4–3	Deportivo Táchira	1–2	3–1
Carabobo FC	5–1	Llaneros de Guanare	4–1	1–0
Zamora FC	2–1	Unión Atlético Falcón	2–1	0–0

== Quarterfinals ==
- First legs: September 9; Second legs: September 16, 23

Team 1	Agg.	Team 2	1st leg	2nd leg
Central & Oriental Group
Caracas FC	2–4	Deportivo La Guaira	1–2	1–2
Deportivo Anzoátegui	3–3 (a)	Tucanes de Amazonas	2–2	1–1
Central & Occidental Group
Deportivo Lara	3–1	Estudiantes de Mérida	1–0	2–1
Zamora FC	2–3	Carabobo FC	1–1	1–2

== Semifinals ==
- First legs: September 23, 30; Second legs: October 1, 7

Team 1	Agg.	Team 2	1st leg	2nd leg
Central & Oriental Group
Tucanes de Amazonas	0–5	Deportivo La Guaira	0–0	0–5
Central & Occidental Group
Carabobo FC	7–7 (a)	Deportivo Lara	6–5	1–2

== Final ==
- First leg: October 21; Second leg: October 28

Team 1	Agg.	Team 2	1st leg	2nd leg
Deportivo Lara	0–1	Deportivo La Guaira	0–0	0–1
