= 2014 Copa Venezuela =

Tournament details
- Country: Venezuela
- Dates: 5 August – 3 December 2014
- Teams: 34

Final positions
- Champions: Deportivo La Guaira (1st title)
- Runners-up: Trujillanos FC

Tournament statistics
- Top goal scorer(s): Fredys Arrieta (8 goals)

The 2014 Copa Venezuela was the 45th staging of the Copa Venezuela. The winner qualified for the 2015 Copa Sudamericana.

== Preliminary round ==
- Teams entering this round: 8 teams from Venezuelan Segunda División.
- First legs: August 5, 6; Second legs: August 13.

Team 1	Agg.	Team 2	1st leg	2nd leg
Margarita FC	4–4 (a)	Diamantes de Guayana	2–1	2–3
Unión Lara	0–3	Monagas SC	0–1	0–2
Policía de Lara FC	5–3	Atlético Socopó FC	2–2	3–1
Lotería del Táchira	w/o	Ureña SC	–	–

== First round ==
- Teams entering this round: 16 teams from Venezuelan Primera División, 8 teams from Venezuelan Segunda División.
- First legs: August 13, 20, 21, September 3; Second legs: September 6, 7.

Team 1	Agg.	Team 2	1st leg	2nd leg
Central & Oriental Group
Margarita FC	4–4 (a)	Deportivo Anzoátegui	2–1	2–3
Estudiantes de Caracas	1–5	Atlético Venezuela	0–2	1–3
Universidad Central	0–10	Deportivo La Guaira	0–6	0–4
Angostura FC	1–2	Mineros de Guayana	0–1	1–1
Metropolitanos FC	4–3	Llaneros de Guanare	2–0	2–3
Monagas SC	1–0	Deportivo Petare	1–0	0–0
Arroceros de Calabozo	2–0	Tucanes de Amazonas	2–0	0–0
Central & Occidental Group
Unión Atlético Falcón	0–3	Zulia FC	0–3	0–0
Gran Valencia	1–5	Aragua FC	0–1	1–4
Portuguesa FC	0–2	Estudiantes de Mérida	0–0	0–2
Atlético El Vigía	3–5	Trujillanos FC	2–3	1–2
Yaracuyanos FC	0–3	Carabobo FC	0–1	0–2
Policía de Lara FC	2–2 (a)	Deportivo Lara	0–0	2–2
Ureña SC	4–5	Deportivo Táchira	3–2	1–3

== Round of 16 ==
- Teams entering this round: Caracas FC (2013 Copa Venezuela champion), Zamora FC (2012–13 Venezuelan Primera División champion).
- First legs: September 17, October 1; Second legs: October 1, 8.

Team 1	Agg.	Team 2	1st leg	2nd leg
Central & Oriental Group
Arroceros de Calabozo	5–4	Caracas FC	2–2	3–2
Monagas SC	2–1	Margarita FC	1–1	1–0
Metropolitanos FC	2–2 (a)	Atlético Venezuela	0–1	2–1
Mineros de Guayana	2–3	Deportivo La Guaira	2–1	0–2
Central & Occidental Group
Deportivo Táchira	3–2	Zamora FC	1–1	2–1
Policía de Lara FC	1–2	Zulia FC	0–1	1–1
Carabobo FC	2–1	Aragua FC	1–0	1–1
Trujillanos FC	3–1	Estudiantes de Mérida	2–0	1–1

== Quarterfinals ==
- First legs: October 12; Second legs: October 22

Team 1	Agg.	Team 2	1st leg	2nd leg
Central & Oriental Group
Arroceros de Calabozo	4–3	Metropolitanos FC	3–1	1–2
Monagas SC	2–7	Deportivo La Guaira	2–4	0–3
Central & Occidental Group
Deportivo Táchira	0–2	Carabobo FC	0–2	0–0
Zulia FC	4–8	Trujillanos FC	4–4	0–4

== Semifinals ==
- First legs: November 5; Second legs: November 16

Team 1	Agg.	Team 2	1st leg	2nd leg
Central & Oriental Group
Arroceros de Calabozo	1–3	Deportivo La Guaira	1–2	0–1
Central & Occidental Group
Trujillanos FC	1–1 (a)	Carabobo FC	0–0	1–1

== Final ==
- First leg: November 26; Second leg: December 3

Team 1	Agg.	Team 2	1st leg	2nd leg
Deportivo La Guaira	2–2 (4–3 p)	Trujillanos FC	1–1	1–1
