= Adalberto Peñaranda =

Venezuelan footballer (born 1997)

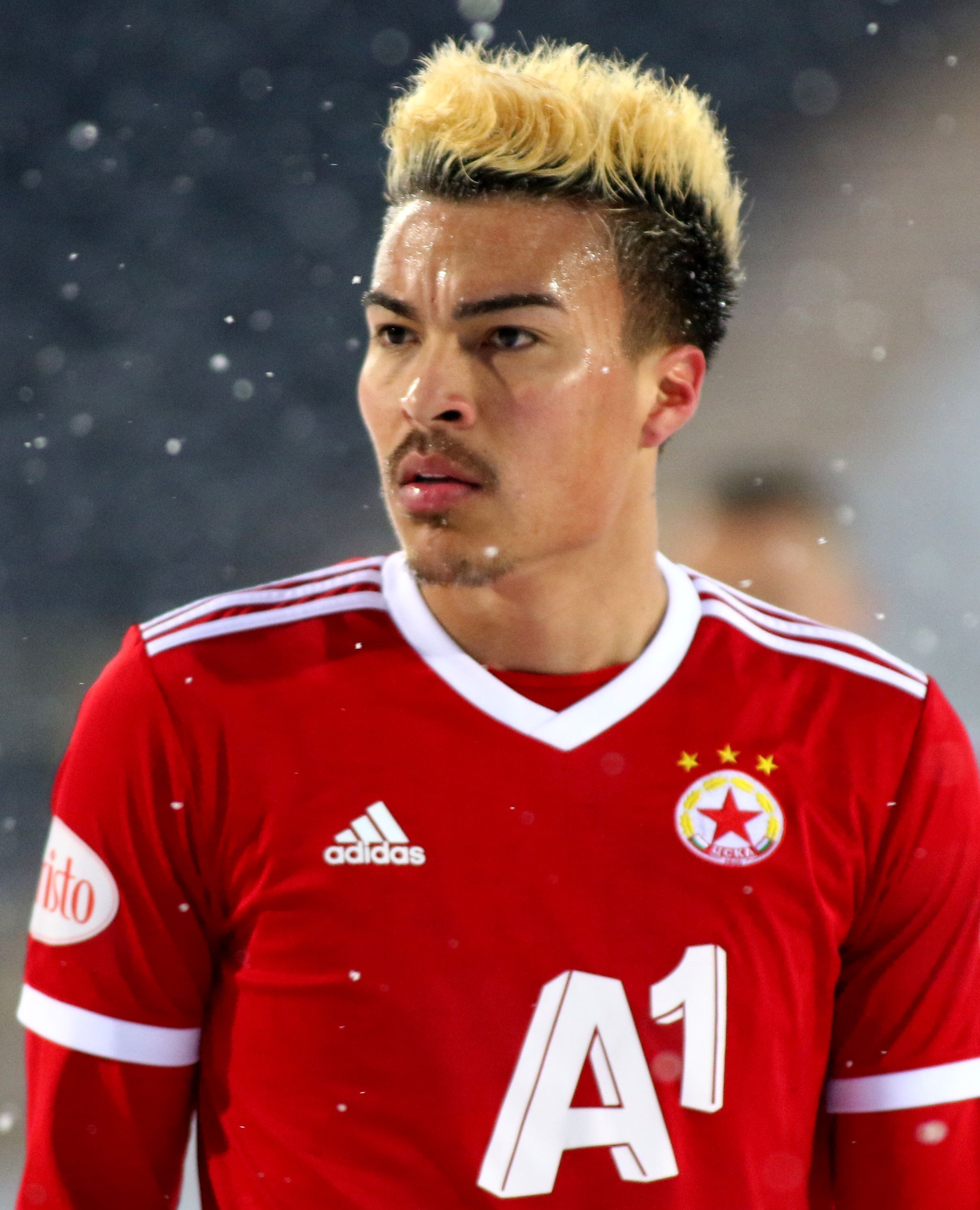
- Peñaranda with CSKA Sofia in 2021

Personal information
- Full name: Adalberto Peñaranda Maestre
- Date of birth: 31 May 1997 (age 29)
- Place of birth: El Vigía, Venezuela
- Height: 1.85 m (6 ft 1 in)
- Positions: Striker; winger

Team information
- Current team: Deportivo Táchira
- Number: 7

Youth career
- Deportivo La Guaira

Senior career*
| Years | Team | Apps | (Gls) |
| 2013–2015 | Deportivo La Guaira | 37 | (4) |
| 2015–2016 | Udinese | 0 | (0) |
| 2015–2016 | → Granada (loan) | 23 | (5) |
| 2016–2022 | Watford | 0 | (0) |
| 2016 | → Granada (loan) | 14 | (1) |
| 2016 | → Udinese (loan) | 6 | (0) |
| 2017–2018 | → Málaga (loan) | 16 | (0) |
| 2019–2020 | → Eupen (loan) | 5 | (0) |
| 2020–2021 | → CSKA Sofia (loan) | 5 | (0) |
| 2021–2022 | → Las Palmas (loan) | 18 | (2) |
| 2022–2023 | Boavista | 0 | (0) |
| 2023–2025 | Sarajevo | 16 | (0) |
| 2024–2025 | → Atlético Bucaramanga (loan) | 18 | (1) |
| 2025– | Deportivo Táchira | 20 | (5) |

International career
| 2013 | Venezuela U17 | 2 | (0) |
| 2014–2017 | Venezuela U20 | 11 | (2) |
| 2016–2022 | Venezuela | 20 | (0) |
- * Club domestic league appearances and goals as of 30 March 2026

Adalberto Peñaranda Maestre (born 31 May 1997) is a Venezuelan professional footballer who plays as a striker for Deportivo Táchira. Peñaranda previously played for Udinese in Italy and Watford in England, as well as appearing on loan for several top-division clubs in other European leagues. He has earned 20 caps for the Venezuela national team between 2016 and 2022.

== Club career ==
=== Early career ===
Peñaranda was born in El Vigía, Alberto Adriani Municipality, Mérida. He is an academy graduate of Deportivo La Guaira and made his professional and Primera División debuts on 11 August 2013, starting in a 1–3 home loss against Deportivo Táchira. Peñaranda scored his first goal as a senior on 23 February 2014, netting his team's only goal in a 1–4 loss at Caracas FC. He finished the 2013–14 Venezuelan Primera División season with 18 appearances to his name, and one goal.

=== The Pozzo Triangle ===
==== Udinese, Granada & Watford ====
On 16 June 2015, Peñaranda signed for Serie A side Udinese, owned by Italian businessman Giampaolo Pozzo. He was then immediately loaned to Granada who at the time were also under the ownership of Pozzo. He made his debut for the La Liga side on 22 November, starting in a 2–0 home win against Athletic Bilbao. Upon making his debut he became the youngest ever player to ever represent the club. On 12 December 2015, Peñaranda scored his first goals in the top flight of Spanish football, netting a brace in a 2–1 away win against Levante UD. In doing so he became the youngest ever non-Spanish player to score a brace in La Liga, breaking the record previously held by Barcelona's Argentine forward, Lionel Messi.

On 1 February of the following year, he signed a four-and-a-half-year deal with Premier League side Watford, owned by Pozzo's son Gino, but remained on loan at Granada for the remainder of the season. At the end of the season Granada were sold to Chinese firm Link International Sports, putting pay to the possibility of Peñaranda returning to the club on loan for another season. Following his arrival at Watford in July, Peñaranda was shipped back to Udinese on a season long loan deal. Granada had agreed to loan Peñaranda while Watford waited for him to qualify for a work permit to play in England.

He made his debut for the Udinese on 13 August 2016, coming on as a second-half substitute for Ryder Matos in a 3–2 Coppa Italia loss to Spezia. His Serie A debut came the following week in a 4–0 drubbing at the hands of Roma, with Peñaranda coming on as a second-half substitute for Rodrigo De Paul.

Peñaranda made his Watford first team debut against Woking in the 3rd round of the FA Cup on 6 January 2019.

==== Loan to Málaga ====
On 5 January 2017, it was announced that Peñaranda had been recalled from Udinese and would spend the remainder of the season on loan with La Liga side Málaga. The deal included an option for Málaga to extend the loan by a further season.

==== Return to Watford ====
Upon his return to Watford he scored his first goal for the club in an EFL Cup tie against Coventry City on 27 August 2019.

==== Loan to Eupen ====
On 2 September 2019, Adalberto Peñaranda moved to Eupen on a one-year loan.

==== Loan to CSKA Sofia ====
On 5 October 2020, Adalberto Peñaranda moved to CSKA Sofia on a one-year loan.

==== Loan to Las Palmas ====
On 12 July 2021, Peñaranda returned to Spain after signing a one-year loan deal with UD Las Palmas in the second division.

=== Boavista ===
On 1 September 2022, Peñaranda joined Primeira Liga side Boavista on a free transfer, signing a 3-year deal. After a year, Peñaranda left Boavista without playing a game, due to a club sanction that kept him from being registered to the squad.

=== Sarajevo ===
On 27 June 2023, joined Bosnian club FK Sarajevo, signing a three-year contract.

==== Loan to Bucaramanga ====
On 25 July 2024, Peñaranda returned to South America, joining Colombian club Atlético Bucaramanga on loan. In the summer of 2025, it was announced that he would not return to Bucaramanga, since his parent club Sarajevo had terminated his loan and contract, rendering him a free agent.

=== Deportivo Táchira ===
On 9 August 2025, Peñaranda returned to Venezuela, joining Deportivo Táchira as a free agent.

== International career ==
In March 2016, he was first called up to the senior Venezuela national team, and he made his debut for the senior team in a World Cup qualifying 2–2 draw against Peru on 24 March 2016.

== Personal life ==
On 18 April 2015, Peñaranda and Deportivo La Guaira teammate Charlis Ortiz were both shot in an attempted robbery after attending a party. Peñaranda was struck in the left thigh with the bullet passing clean through. Ortiz, however, was struck in the rib area and had to undergo surgery the following day.

== Career statistics ==
=== Club ===
As of match played 30 March 2026

Appearances and goals by club, season and competition
| Club | Season | League | | | National cup (Note: Includes Copa Venezuela, Coppa Italia, Copa del Rey, FA Cup, Belgian Cup, Bulgarian Cup, Taça de Portugal, Bosnia and Herzegovina Cup, Copa Colombia) | | League cup (Note: Includes EFL Cup, Taça da Liga) | | Continental | | Total | |
| Club | Season | Division | Apps | Goals | Apps | Goals | Apps | Goals | Apps | Goals | Apps | Goals |
|---|---|---|---|---|---|---|---|---|---|---|---|---|
| Deportivo La Guaira | 2013–14 | Venezuelan Primera División | 18 | 1 | 4 | 0 | — | | — | | 22 | 1 |
| Deportivo La Guaira | 2014–15 | Venezuelan Primera División | 19 | 3 | 1 | 0 | — | | 2 (Note: Appearances in Copa Sudamericana) | 0 | 22 | 3 |
| Deportivo La Guaira | Total | | 37 | 4 | 5 | 0 | — | | 2 | 0 | 44 | 4 |
| Udinese | 2015–16 | Serie A | 0 | 0 | 0 | 0 | — | | — | | 0 | 0 |
| Granada B (loan) | 2015–16 | Segunda División B | 9 | 3 | — | | — | | — | | 9 | 3 |
| Granada (loan) | 2015–16 | La Liga | 23 | 5 | 4 | 0 | — | | — | | 27 | 5 |
| Watford | 2016–17 | Premier League | 0 | 0 | 0 | 0 | 0 | 0 | — | | 0 | 0 |
| Watford | 2017–18 | Premier League | 0 | 0 | 0 | 0 | 0 | 0 | — | | 0 | 0 |
| Watford | 2018–19 | Premier League | 0 | 0 | 2 | 0 | 0 | 0 | — | | 2 | 0 |
| Watford | 2019–20 | Premier League | 0 | 0 | 0 | 0 | 1 | 1 | — | | 1 | 1 |
| Watford | 2020–21 | Championship | 0 | 0 | 0 | 0 | 1 | 1 | — | | 1 | 1 |
| Watford | 2021–22 | Premier League | 0 | 0 | 0 | 0 | 0 | 0 | — | | 0 | 0 |
| Watford | Total | | 0 | 0 | 2 | 0 | 2 | 2 | — | | 4 | 2 |
| Udinese (loan) | 2016–17 | Serie A | 6 | 0 | 1 | 0 | — | | — | | 7 | 0 |
| Málaga (loan) | 2016–17 | La Liga | 3 | 0 | 0 | 0 | — | | — | | 3 | 0 |
| Málaga (loan) | 2017–18 | La Liga | 13 | 0 | 0 | 0 | — | | — | | 13 | 0 |
| Málaga (loan) | Total | | 16 | 0 | 0 | 0 | — | | — | | 16 | 0 |
| Eupen (loan) | 2019–20 | Belgian First Division A | 5 | 0 | 1 | 0 | — | | — | | 6 | 0 |
| CSKA Sofia (loan) | 2020–21 | First League | 5 | 0 | 2 | 0 | — | | 2 (Note: Appearances in UEFA Europa League) | 0 | 9 | 0 |
| Las Palmas (loan) | 2021–22 | Segunda División | 18 | 2 | 1 | 0 | — | | — | | 19 | 2 |
| Boavista | 2022–23 | Primeira Liga | 0 | 0 | 0 | 0 | 0 | 0 | — | | 0 | 0 |
| Sarajevo | 2023–24 | Bosnian Premier League | 16 | 0 | 4 | 1 | — | | 0 | 0 | 20 | 1 |
| Atlético Bucaramanga (loan) | 2024 | Categoría Primera A | 8 | 0 | 4 | 0 | — | | — | | 12 | 0 |
| Atlético Bucaramanga (loan) | 2025 | Categoría Primera A | 10 | 1 | 0 | 0 | — | | 4 (Note: Appearances in Copa Libertadores) | 0 | 14 | 1 |
| Atlético Bucaramanga (loan) | Total | | 18 | 1 | 4 | 0 | — | | 4 | 0 | 26 | 1 |
| Deportivo Táchira | 2025 | Liga FUTVE | 11 | 3 | 2 | 0 | — | | — | | 13 | 3 |
| Deportivo Táchira | 2026 | Liga FUTVE | 9 | 2 | 0 | 0 | — | | 4 (Note: Appearances in Copa Libertadores) | 0 | 13 | 2 |
| Deportivo Táchira | Total | | 20 | 5 | 2 | 0 | — | | 4 | 0 | 26 | 5 |
| Career totals | | | 173 | 20 | 28 | 1 | 2 | 2 | 12 | 0 | 213 | 23 |

=== International ===
As of match played 9 June 2022

Appearances and goals by national team and year
| National team | Year | Apps | Goals |
|---|---|---|---|
| Venezuela | 2016 | 11 | 0 |
| Venezuela | 2017 | 1 | 0 |
| Venezuela | 2018 | 1 | 0 |
| Venezuela | 2019 | 2 | 0 |
| Venezuela | 2021 | 3 | 0 |
| Venezuela | 2022 | 2 | 0 |
| Total | | 20 | 0 |

== Honours ==
Deportivo La Guaira

- Copa Venezuela: 2014

CSKA Sofia

- Bulgarian Cup: 2020–21

Venezuela U20

- FIFA U-20 World Cup runner-up: 2017

Venezuela U17

- South American Under-17 Football Championship runner-up: 2013
