= 2016 Copa Sudamericana =

Tournament details
- Dates: 9 August – 24 November 2016 (Finals, scheduled for 30 November and 7 December, suspended on 29 November; title awarded on 5 December)
- Teams: 47 (from 10 associations)

Final positions
- Champions: (Brazil) Chapecoense (awarded) (1st title)
- Runners-up: (Colombia) Atlético Nacional

Tournament statistics
- Matches played: 90
- Goals scored: 181 (2.01 per match)
- Top scorer(s): (Colombia) Miguel Borja (Paraguay) Cecilio Domínguez (6 goals each)

The 2016 Copa Sudamericana (Portuguese: Copa Sul-Americana 2016) (officially the 2016 Copa Total Sudamericana for sponsorship reasons) was the 15th edition of the Copa Sudamericana, South America's secondary club football tournament organized by CONMEBOL.

The finals were originally to be played between Brazilian team Chapecoense and Colombian team Atlético Nacional. However, on 28 November 2016, LaMia Flight 2933, which was carrying Chapecoense squad to the first leg, crashed on the way to the José María Córdova International Airport. There were 71 fatalities, including 19 of the 22 Chapecoense players on the plane. CONMEBOL immediately suspended all activities, including the scheduled final matches, in the early morning of 29 November. In light of these events, Atlético Nacional requested that CONMEBOL award the title to Chapecoense, which they did on 5 December, while Atlético Nacional received the "CONMEBOL Centenario Fair Play" award for their gesture.

As winners of the 2016 Copa Sudamericana, Chapecoense earned the right to play against the winners of the 2016 Copa Libertadores in the 2017 Recopa Sudamericana, and the winners of the 2016 J.League Cup in the 2017 Suruga Bank Championship. They also automatically qualified for the 2017 Copa Libertadores group stage. Santa Fe were the defending champions, but were eliminated by Cerro Porteño in the Round of 16.

== Teams ==
The following 47 teams from the 10 CONMEBOL associations qualified for the tournament:

- Title holders
- Brazil: 8 berths
- Argentina: 6 berths
- All other associations: 4 berths each

The entry stage was determined as follows:

- Round of 16: Title holders
- Second stage: 14 teams (teams from Argentina and Brazil)
- First stage: 32 teams (teams from all other associations)

Association	Team (Berth)	Entry stage	Qualification method
(Argentina) Argentina; 6 berths	San Lorenzo (Argentina 1)	Second stage	2015 Supercopa Argentina champion
(Argentina) Argentina; 6 berths	Independiente (Argentina 2)	Second stage	2015 Primera División Liguilla Pre-Libertadores runner-up
(Argentina) Argentina; 6 berths	Belgrano (Argentina 3)	Second stage	2015 Primera División Liguilla Pre-Sudamericana winner with best record in league table
(Argentina) Argentina; 6 berths	Estudiantes (Argentina 4)	Second stage	2015 Primera División Liguilla Pre-Sudamericana winner with 2nd best record in league table
(Argentina) Argentina; 6 berths	Banfield (Argentina 5)	Second stage	2015 Primera División Liguilla Pre-Sudamericana winner with 3rd best record in league table
(Argentina) Argentina; 6 berths	Lanús (Argentina 6)	Second stage	2015 Primera División Liguilla Pre-Sudamericana winner with 4th best record in league table
(Bolivia) Bolivia; 4 berths	Bolívar (Bolivia 1)	First stage	2014 Apertura champion and 2015 Clausura champion
(Bolivia) Bolivia; 4 berths	Jorge Wilstermann (Bolivia 2)	First stage	2014–15 Primera División aggregate table best team not qualified for 2016 Copa Libertadores
(Bolivia) Bolivia; 4 berths	Blooming (Bolivia 3)	First stage	2014–15 Primera División aggregate table 2nd best team not qualified for 2016 Copa Libertadores
(Bolivia) Bolivia; 4 berths	Real Potosí (Bolivia 4)	First stage	2014–15 Primera División aggregate table 3rd best team not qualified for 2016 Copa Libertadores
(Brazil) Brazil; 8 berths	Sport Recife (Brazil 1)	Second stage	2015 Série A or 2015 Série B best team eliminated before 2016 Copa do Brasil round of 16
(Brazil) Brazil; 8 berths	Flamengo (Brazil 2)	Second stage	2015 Série A or 2015 Série B 2nd best team eliminated before 2016 Copa do Brasil round of 16
(Brazil) Brazil; 8 berths	Chapecoense (Brazil 3)	Second stage	2015 Série A or 2015 Série B 3rd best team eliminated before 2016 Copa do Brasil round of 16
(Brazil) Brazil; 8 berths	Coritiba (Brazil 4)	Second stage	2015 Série A or 2015 Série B 4th best team eliminated before 2016 Copa do Brasil round of 16
(Brazil) Brazil; 8 berths	Figueirense (Brazil 5)	Second stage	2015 Série A or 2015 Série B 5th best team eliminated before 2016 Copa do Brasil round of 16
(Brazil) Brazil; 8 berths	Vitória (Brazil 6)	Second stage	2015 Série A or 2015 Série B 6th best team eliminated before 2016 Copa do Brasil round of 16
(Brazil) Brazil; 8 berths	Santa Cruz (Brazil 7)	Second stage	2016 Copa do Nordeste champion
(Brazil) Brazil; 8 berths	Cuiabá (Brazil 8)	Second stage	2015 Copa Verde champion
(Chile) Chile; 4 berths	Universidad Católica (Chile 1)	First stage	2015 Apertura Liguilla winner
(Chile) Chile; 4 berths	O'Higgins (Chile 2)	First stage	2016 Clausura Liguilla winner
(Chile) Chile; 4 berths	Palestino (Chile 3)	First stage	2015–16 Primera División aggregate table best team not qualified for 2016 Copa Libertadores
(Chile) Chile; 4 berths	Universidad de Concepción (Chile 4)	First stage	2015–16 Primera División aggregate table 2nd best team not qualified for 2016 Copa Libertadores
(Colombia) Colombia; 4 + 1 berths	Santa Fe (Title holders)	Round of 16	2015 Copa Sudamericana champion
(Colombia) Colombia; 4 + 1 berths	Junior (Colombia 1)	First stage	2015 Copa Colombia champion
(Colombia) Colombia; 4 + 1 berths	Atlético Nacional (Colombia 2)	First stage	2016 Superliga Colombiana champion
(Colombia) Colombia; 4 + 1 berths	Independiente Medellín (Colombia 3)	First stage	2015 Primera A aggregate table best team not qualified for 2016 Copa Libertadores
(Colombia) Colombia; 4 + 1 berths	Deportes Tolima (Colombia 4)	First stage	2015 Primera A aggregate table 2nd best team not qualified for 2016 Copa Libertadores
(Ecuador) Ecuador; 4 berths	Emelec (Ecuador 1)	First stage	2015 Serie A champion
(Ecuador) Ecuador; 4 berths	Universidad Católica (Ecuador 2)	First stage	2015 Serie A aggregate table best team not qualified for 2016 Copa Libertadores
(Ecuador) Ecuador; 4 berths	Barcelona (Ecuador 3)	First stage	2015 Serie A aggregate table 2nd best team not qualified for 2016 Copa Libertadores
(Ecuador) Ecuador; 4 berths	Aucas (Ecuador 4)	First stage	2015 Serie A aggregate table 3rd best team not qualified for 2016 Copa Libertadores
(Paraguay) Paraguay; 4 berths	Cerro Porteño (Paraguay 1)	First stage	2015 tournament (2015 Apertura or 2015 Clausura) champion with better record in aggregate table
(Paraguay) Paraguay; 4 berths	Libertad (Paraguay 2)	First stage	2015 Primera División aggregate table best team not qualified for 2016 Copa Libertadores
(Paraguay) Paraguay; 4 berths	Sol de América (Paraguay 3)	First stage	2015 Primera División aggregate table 2nd best team not qualified for 2016 Copa Libertadores
(Paraguay) Paraguay; 4 berths	Sportivo Luqueño (Paraguay 4)	First stage	2015 Primera División aggregate table 3rd best team not qualified for 2016 Copa Libertadores
(Peru) Peru; 4 berths	Real Garcilaso (Peru 1)	First stage	2015 Descentralizado 4th place
(Peru) Peru; 4 berths	Sport Huancayo (Peru 2)	First stage	2015 Descentralizado aggregate table best team not qualified for playoffs
(Peru) Peru; 4 berths	Deportivo Municipal (Peru 3)	First stage	2015 Descentralizado aggregate table 2nd best team not qualified for playoffs
(Peru) Peru; 4 berths	Universitario (Peru 4)	First stage	2015 Descentralizado aggregate table 3rd best team not qualified for playoffs
(Uruguay) Uruguay; 4 berths	Peñarol (Uruguay 1)	First stage	2015–16 Primera División champion
(Uruguay) Uruguay; 4 berths	Plaza Colonia (Uruguay 2)	First stage	2015–16 Primera División aggregate table best team not qualified for 2017 Copa Libertadores
(Uruguay) Uruguay; 4 berths	Montevideo Wanderers (Uruguay 3)	First stage	2015–16 Primera División aggregate table 2nd best team not qualified for 2017 Copa Libertadores
(Uruguay) Uruguay; 4 berths	Fénix (Uruguay 4)	First stage	2015–16 Primera División aggregate table 3rd best team not qualified for 2017 Copa Libertadores
(Venezuela) Venezuela; 4 berths	Deportivo La Guaira (Venezuela 1)	First stage	2015 Copa Venezuela champion
(Venezuela) Venezuela; 4 berths	Zamora (Venezuela 2)	First stage	2015 Adecuación champion
(Venezuela) Venezuela; 4 berths	Deportivo Anzoátegui (Venezuela 3)	First stage	2016 Apertura runner-up
(Venezuela) Venezuela; 4 berths	Deportivo Lara (Venezuela 4)	First stage	2015 Copa Venezuela runner-up

== Draw ==
Location of teams of the 2016 Copa Sudamericana.

The draw of the tournament was held on 12 July 2016, 20:00 CLT (UTC−4), at the Espacio Riesco Convention and Events Center in Huechuraba, Chile.

For the first stage, the 32 teams were divided into two zones:

- South Zone: The 16 teams from Bolivia, Chile, Paraguay, and Uruguay were drawn into eight ties.
- North Zone: The 16 teams from Colombia, Ecuador, Peru, and Venezuela were drawn into eight ties.

Teams which qualified for berths 1 were drawn against teams which qualified for berths 4, and teams which qualified for berths 2 were drawn against teams which qualified for berths 3, with the former hosting the second leg in both cases. Teams from the same association could not be drawn into the same tie. For the second stage, the 30 teams, including the 16 winners of the first stage (eight from South Zone, eight from North Zone), whose identity was not known at the time of the draw, and the 14 teams which entered the second stage, were divided into three sections:

- Winners of the first stage: The 16 winners of the first stage were drawn into eight ties, with the order of legs decided by draw. Teams from the same association could be drawn into the same tie.
- Brazil: The eight teams from Brazil were drawn into four ties. Teams which qualified for berths 1–4 were drawn against teams which qualified for berths 5–8, with the former hosting the second leg.
- Argentina: The six teams from Argentina were drawn into three ties. Teams which qualified for berths 1–3 were drawn against teams which qualified for berths 4–6, with the former hosting the second leg.

== Schedule ==
The schedule of the competition was as follows (all dates listed are Wednesdays, but matches may be played on Tuesdays and Thursdays as well).

Stage	First leg	Second leg
First stage	10 August	17 August
Second stage	24 August	31 August; 14 September
Round of 16	21 September	28 September
Quarterfinals	19 October	26 October
Semifinals	2 November	23 November
Finals	30 November	7 December

Notes

1. ^{†} For matches involving teams from Brazil.
2. ^{‡} Cancelled due to crash of LaMia Flight 2933.

== Elimination stages ==
In the elimination stages (first stage and second stage), each tie was played on a home-and-away two-legged basis. If tied on aggregate, the away goals rule would be used. If still tied, extra time would not be played, and the penalty shoot-out would be used to determine the winner (Regulations Article 5.1). The 15 winners of the second stage (eight from winners of the first stage, four from Brazil, three from Argentina) advanced to the round of 16 to join the defending champions (Santa Fe).

=== First stage ===
Team 1	Agg.	Team 2	1st leg	2nd leg
South Zone
Fénix (Uruguay)	1–2	(Paraguay) Cerro Porteño	1–0	0–2
Sportivo Luqueño (Paraguay)	1–1 (a)	(Uruguay) Peñarol	0–0	1–1
Universidad de Concepción (Chile)	2–3	(Bolivia) Bolívar	2–0	0–3
Real Potosí (Bolivia)	4–2	(Chile) Universidad Católica	3–1	1–1
Blooming (Bolivia)	1–1 (4–1 p)	(Uruguay) Plaza Colonia	1–0	0–1
Sol de América (Paraguay)	2–2 (5–4 p)	(Bolivia) Jorge Wilstermann	1–1	1–1
Montevideo Wanderers (Uruguay)	0–0 (5–4 p)	(Chile) O'Higgins	0–0	0–0
Palestino (Chile)	4–0	(Paraguay) Libertad	1–0	3–0
North Zone
Universitario (Peru)	1–6	(Ecuador) Emelec	0–3	1–3
Aucas (Ecuador)	2–2 (a)	(Peru) Real Garcilaso	2–1	0–1
Deportivo Lara (Venezuela)	2–5	(Colombia) Junior	1–3	1–2
Deportes Tolima (Colombia)	0–1	(Venezuela) Deportivo La Guaira	0–0	0–1
Barcelona (Ecuador)	2–2 (0–3 p)	(Venezuela) Zamora	1–1	1–1
Independiente Medellín (Colombia)	2–1	(Ecuador) Universidad Católica	1–1	1–0
Deportivo Anzoátegui (Venezuela)	2–2 (a)	(Peru) Sport Huancayo	2–1	0–1
Deportivo Municipal (Peru)	0–6	(Colombia) Atlético Nacional	0–5	0–1

=== Second stage ===
Team 1	Agg.	Team 2	1st leg	2nd leg
Santa Cruz (Brazil)	1–0	(Brazil) Sport Recife	0–0	1–0
Deportivo La Guaira (Venezuela)	4–2	(Ecuador) Emelec	4–2	0–0
Cuiabá (Brazil)	2–3	(Brazil) Chapecoense	1–0	1–3
Bolívar (Bolivia)	1–2	(Colombia) Atlético Nacional	1–1	0–1
Estudiantes (Argentina)	1–2	(Argentina) Belgrano	1–0	0–2
Blooming (Bolivia)	1–3	(Colombia) Junior	0–2	1–1
Figueirense (Brazil)	5–5 (a)	(Brazil) Flamengo	4–2	1–3
Cerro Porteño (Paraguay)	7–0	(Bolivia) Real Potosí	6–0	1–0
Real Garcilaso (Peru)	2–3	(Chile) Palestino	2–2	0–1
Zamora (Venezuela)	0–2	(Uruguay) Montevideo Wanderers	0–1	0–1
Vitória (Brazil)	2–2 (a)	(Brazil) Coritiba	2–1	0–1
Sol de América (Paraguay)	2–1	(Peru) Sport Huancayo	1–0	1–1
Lanús (Argentina)	0–3	(Argentina) Independiente	0–2	0–1
Banfield (Argentina)	3–4	(Argentina) San Lorenzo	2–0	1–4
Independiente Medellín (Colombia)	3–2	(Paraguay) Sportivo Luqueño	3–0	0–2

== Final stages ==
In the final stages, the 16 teams played a single-elimination tournament, with the following rules:

- Each tie was played on a home-and-away two-legged basis, with the higher-seeded team hosting the second leg (Regulations Article 3.2).
- In the round of 16, quarterfinals, and semifinals, if tied on aggregate, the away goals rule would be used. If still tied, extra time would not be played, and the penalty shoot-out would be used to determine the winner (Regulations Article 5.1).
- In the finals, if tied on aggregate, the away goals rule would not be used, and 30 minutes of extra time would be played. If still tied after extra time, the penalty shoot-out would be used to determine the winner (Regulations Article 5.2).

CONMEBOL confirmed that the bracket would remain the same as the draw of the tournament regardless of the nationality of the semifinalists. In previous seasons, if there were two semifinalists from the same association, they had to play each other. The qualified teams were seeded in the final stages according to the draw of the tournament, with each team assigned a "seed" 1–16 by draw.

=== Bracket ===
Round of 16
16	(Colombia) Independiente Medellín (a)	2	1	3
1	(Brazil) Santa Cruz	0	3	3
9	(Colombia) Santa Fe	2	1	3
8	(Paraguay) Cerro Porteño	0	4	4
12	(Brazil) Coritiba (p)	1	2	3 (4)
5	(Argentina) Belgrano	2	1	3 (3)
13	(Paraguay) Sol de América	1	0	1
4	(Colombia) Atlético Nacional	1	2	3
15	(Argentina) San Lorenzo	2	2	4
2	(Venezuela) Deportivo La Guaira	1	0	1
10	(Chile) Palestino (a)	0	2	2
7	(Brazil) Flamengo	1	1	2
11	(Uruguay) Montevideo Wanderers	0	0	0 (3)
6	(Colombia) Junior (p)	0	0	0 (4)
14	(Argentina) Independiente	0	0	0 (4)
3	(Brazil) Chapecoense (p)	0	0	0 (5)

Quarterfinals
16	(Colombia) Independiente Medellín	0	0	0
8	(Paraguay) Cerro Porteño	0	2	2
12	(Brazil) Coritiba	1	1	2
4	(Colombia) Atlético Nacional	1	3	4
15	(Argentina) San Lorenzo	2	0	2
10	(Chile) Palestino	0	1	1
6	(Colombia) Junior	1	0	1
3	(Brazil) Chapecoense	0	3	3

Semifinals
8	(Paraguay) Cerro Porteño	1	0	1
4	(Colombia) Atlético Nacional (a)	1	0	1
15	(Argentina) San Lorenzo	1	0	1
3	(Brazil) Chapecoense (a)	1	0	1

Finals
4	(Colombia) Atlético Nacional	—	—	—
3	(Brazil) Chapecoense (awd.)	—	—	—

=== Round of 16 ===
Team 1	Agg.	Team 2	1st leg	2nd leg
Independiente Medellín (Colombia)	3–3 (a)	(Brazil) Santa Cruz	2–0	1–3
San Lorenzo (Argentina)	4–1	(Venezuela) Deportivo La Guaira	2–1	2–0
Independiente (Argentina)	0–0 (4–5 p)	(Brazil) Chapecoense	0–0	0–0
Sol de América (Paraguay)	1–3	(Colombia) Atlético Nacional	1–1	0–2
Coritiba (Brazil)	3–3 (4–3 p)	(Argentina) Belgrano	1–2	2–1
Montevideo Wanderers (Uruguay)	0–0 (3–4 p)	(Colombia) Junior	0–0	0–0
Palestino (Chile)	2–2 (a)	(Brazil) Flamengo	0–1	2–1
Santa Fe (Colombia)	3–4	(Paraguay) Cerro Porteño	2–0	1–4

=== Quarterfinals ===
Team 1	Agg.	Team 2	1st leg	2nd leg
Independiente Medellín (Colombia)	0–2	(Paraguay) Cerro Porteño	0–0	0–2
San Lorenzo (Argentina)	2–1	(Chile) Palestino	2–0	0–1
Junior (Colombia)	1–3	(Brazil) Chapecoense	1–0	0–3
Coritiba (Brazil)	2–4	(Colombia) Atlético Nacional	1–1	1–3

=== Semifinals ===
Team 1	Agg.	Team 2	1st leg	2nd leg
Cerro Porteño (Paraguay)	1–1 (a)	(Colombia) Atlético Nacional	1–1	0–0
San Lorenzo (Argentina)	1–1 (a)	(Brazil) Chapecoense	1–1	0–0

=== Finals ===
The finals were suspended on 29 November following the crash of LaMia Flight 2933. CONMEBOL awarded the title to Chapecoense on 5 December 2016.

Team 1	Agg.	Team 2	1st leg	2nd leg
Atlético Nacional (Colombia)	awd.	(Brazil) Chapecoense	Cancelled	Cancelled

== Statistics ==
=== Top goalscorers ===
Rank	Player	Team	Goals
1	(Colombia) Miguel Borja	(Colombia) Atlético Nacional	6
1	(Paraguay) Cecilio Domínguez	(Paraguay) Cerro Porteño	6
3	(Argentina) Nicolás Blandi	(Argentina) San Lorenzo	5
4	(Argentina) Claudio Bieler	(Argentina) Belgrano	4
4	(Chile) Leonardo Valencia	(Chile) Palestino	4
6	(Paraguay) Guillermo Beltrán	(Paraguay) Cerro Porteño	3
6	(Uruguay) Martín Cauteruccio	(Argentina) San Lorenzo	3
6	(Argentina) Jonathan David Gómez	(Colombia) Santa Fe	3
6	(Brazil) Grafite	(Brazil) Santa Cruz	3
6	(Brazil) Iago	(Brazil) Coritiba	3
6	(Paraguay) Roberto Ovelar	(Colombia) Junior	3
6	(Brazil) Rafael Moura	(Brazil) Figueirense	3
6	(Paraguay) Rodrigo Rojas	(Paraguay) Cerro Porteño	3
6	(Argentina) Denis Stracqualursi	(Ecuador) Emelec	3

Source: CONMEBOL.com

=== Top assists ===
Rank	Player	Team	Assists
1	(Colombia) Macnelly Torres	(Colombia) Atlético Nacional	4
2	(Colombia) Orlando Berrío	(Colombia) Atlético Nacional	2
2	(Argentina) Fernando Belluschi	(Argentina) San Lorenzo	2
2	(Colombia) Daniel Bocanegra	(Colombia) Atlético Nacional	2
2	(Colombia) Juan Fernando Caicedo	(Colombia) Independiente Medellín	2
2	(Brazil) Dener	(Brazil) Chapecoense	2
2	(Venezuela) Darwin González	(Venezuela) Deportivo La Guaira	2
2	(Venezuela) Alejandro Guerra	(Colombia) Atlético Nacional	2
2	(Colombia) Sebastián Hernández	(Colombia) Junior	2
2	(Colombia) Vladimir Hernández	(Colombia) Junior	2
2	(Brazil) Juan	(Brazil) Coritiba	2
2	(Colombia) Cristian Marrugo	(Colombia) Independiente Medellín	2
2	(Colombia) Jhon Mosquera	(Colombia) Atlético Nacional	2
2	(Venezuela) Gustavo Rojas	(Venezuela) Deportivo La Guaira	2
2	(Argentina) Matías Suárez	(Argentina) Belgrano	2
2	(Chile) Diego Torres	(Chile) Palestino	2
2	(Chile) Leonardo Valencia	(Chile) Palestino	2

Source: CONMEBOL.com

== See also ==
- 2016 Copa Libertadores
- 2017 Recopa Sudamericana
- 2017 Suruga Bank Championship
