= Daniel Benítez =

Daniel Benítez may refer to:

- Daniel Benítez (Paraguayan footballer) (born 1979)
- Daniel Benítez (Venezuelan footballer) (1987–2021)
- Dani Benítez (born 1987), Spanish footballer
