= Jesús Sandrea =

Venezuelan footballer (born 2001)

Personal information
- Full name: Jesús Enmanuel Sandrea Briceño
- Date of birth: 29 December 2001 (age 24)
- Place of birth: Valera, Venezuela
- Position: Attacking midfielder

Youth career
- Trujillanos

Senior career*
Years	Team	Apps	(Gls)
2018–2021	Trujillanos	21	(1)
2021–2022	Monagas	1	(0)
2023	Trujillanos		
- * Club domestic league appearances and goals as of 19:16, 3 September 2023 (UTC)

Jesús Enmanuel Sandrea Briceño or Chuchin (born 29 December 2001) is a Venezuelan footballer who plays as an attacking midfielder.

== Career ==
=== Club career ===
Sandrea is a product of Trujillanos and got his professional debut for the club in the Venezuelan Primera División on 12 August 2018 against Mineros de Guayana. He started on the bench, before replacing Enderson Torrealba for the last few minutes.

In June 2021, Sandrea moved to Monagas. In July 2023, he returned to Trujillanos.
