= Naicol Contreras =

Venezuelan footballer (born 2000)

Personal information
- Full name: Naicol Israel Contreras Salinas
- Date of birth: 5 April 2000 (age 26)
- Place of birth: San Cristóbal, Venezuela
- Height: 1.73 m (5 ft 8 in)
- Position: Left-back

Youth career
- Deportivo Táchira

Senior career*
Years	Team	Apps	(Gls)
2017–2021	Deportivo Táchira	24	(0)
- * Club domestic league appearances and goals as of 21:30, 23 December 2021 (UTC)

Naicol Israel Contreras Salinas (born 5 April 2000) is a Venezuelan footballer who plays as a left-back.

== Career ==
=== Club career ===
Contreras is a product of Deportivo Táchira. He got his professional debut for the club at the age of 17 on 1 May 2017 in the Venezuelan Primera División against Zamora. Contreras started on the bench, but replaced Jeizon Ramírez in the 28th minute. He left Táchira at the end of 2021.
