= Daniel Benítez (Venezuelan footballer) =

Venezuelan footballer (1987–2021)

Personal information
- Full name: Daniel Eduardo Benítez Pernía
- Date of birth: 23 September 1987
- Place of birth: San Cristóbal, Venezuela
- Date of death: 9 April 2021 (aged 33)
- Position: Defender

Senior career*
| Years | Team | Apps | (Gls) |
| 2003–2004 | Nueva Cadiz | 0 | (0) |
| 2004–2008 | Deportivo Táchira | 3 | (0) |
| 2008–2009 | Minervén | 10 | (0) |
| 2008–2010 | Deportivo Táchira | 16 | (0) |
| 2010–2016 | Deportivo La Guaira | 132 | (4) |
| 2016 | Mineros | 12 | (0) |
| 2017–2019 | Deportivo Táchira | 49 | (1) |
| 2019 | Estudiantes de Caracas | 9 | (0) |
| 2020 | Zamora | 4 | (0) |

International career
| 2016 | Venezuela | 1 | (0) |
- * Club domestic league appearances and goals

Daniel Eduardo Benítez Pernía (23 September 1987 – 9 April 2021) was a Venezuelan professional footballer. A defender, he played for seven club sides and made one appearance for the Venezuela national team.

== Club career ==
With Deportivo La Guaira he won the Copa Venezuela in 2014 and 2015. His final match was for Zamora in 2020.

== International career ==
Benítez's only international appearance was against Costa Rica in 2016.

== Death ==
Benítez was diagnosed with cancer in March 2020 and died of cancer on 9 April 2021.

== Honours ==
- Copa Venezuela: 2014, 2015
