= Diego Cochas =

Argentine football midfielder

Personal information
- Full name: Diego Emiliano Cocha
- Date of birth: August 14, 1979 (age 47)
- Place of birth: Córdoba Province, Argentina
- Height: 1.73 m (5 ft 8 in)
- Position: Midfielder

Youth career
- 1999–2000: River Plate

Senior career*
Years	Team	Apps	(Gls)
2001–2002	Defensores de Belgrano	¿?	(¿?)
2002–2003	Huracán	23	(0)
2003–2004	Defensores de Belgrano	¿?	(¿?)
2004–2005	Ferro Carril Oeste	23	(4)
2005	Nueva Chicago	15	(0)
2006	Deportivo Pereira	30	(7)
2007	Deportes Tolima	9	(0)
2007	La Equidad	23	(3)
2008	Millonarios	15	(0)
2008–2009	La Equidad	43	(9)
2010	Cúcuta Deportivo	34	(1)
2011–2012	Deportivo Lara	41	(4)
2012–2013	Deportivo Táchira	31	(6)
2013–2014	Tristán Suárez	8	(0)
- * Club domestic league appearances and goals

Diego Cochas (born August 14, 1979, in Córdoba Province) is a retired Argentine football midfielder.

Before moving to Colombian football in 2006, Cochas played for a number of clubs in the lower leagues of Argentine football. Between 2002 and 2003 he played in the Argentine Primera with Club Atlético Huracán.
