= Steven Pabón =

Venezuelan footballer (born 2001)

Personal information
- Full name: Steven Jesús Pabón Delgao
- Date of birth: 25 July 2001 (age 25)
- Place of birth: Caracas, Venezuela
- Height: 1.79 m (5 ft 10 in)
- Position: Centre-back

Team information
- Current team: Metropolitanos
- Number: 2

Youth career
- Metropolitanos

Senior career*
Years	Team	Apps	(Gls)
2018–	Metropolitanos	59	(2)
- * Club domestic league appearances and goals as of 10:16, 22 September 2024 (UTC)

Steven Jesús Pabón Delgao (born 25 July 2001) is a Venezuelan footballer who plays as a centre-back for Venezuelan Primera División club Metropolitanos.

== Club career ==
=== Metropolitanos ===
Pabón is a product of Metropolitanos. He got his professional debut for Metropolitanos on 19 May 2018 in a Venezuelan Primera División game against Deportivo Lara.
