= Deportivo La Guaira F.C. =

Association football club in Venezuela

Deportivo La Guaira
- Full name: Deportivo La Guaira Fútbol Club
- Nicknames: Los Naranjas; La Naranja Mecánica; La Ola Naranja
- Founded: July 21, 2008; 18 years ago (as Real Esppor Club)
- Ground: Estadio Olímpico de la UCV
- Capacity: 23,940
- Chairman: George Antar
- Manager: Mariano Rodríguez
- League: Liga FUTVE
- 2025: Liga FUTVE, 1st of 14
Home colours	Away colours

Deportivo La Guaira (formerly known as Real Esppor) is a professional football club promoted to the Venezuelan league in 2009, based in La Guaira but playing its home games in Caracas at the Estadio Olímpico de la UCV.

== History ==
=== Real Esppor ===
The club was founded in Caracas on 21 July 2008 under the name Real Esppor Club, with Esppor being a combination of the words España (Spain) and Portugal because the founders of the club were entrepreneurs with Spanish and Portuguese ancestry. It was originally intended to be the reincarnation of Deportivo Galicia, four-time champions of the Venezuelan Primera División, however the debts the original club still had with the Venezuelan Football Federation prevented the founders from using said name.

Real Esppor entered the Venezuelan Segunda División for its 2008–09 season and played its first match in the competition on 16 August 2008, a 2–1 win over Trujillanos. The team only played one season in the second tier, being promoted to Primera División after they merged with the Segunda División champions Unión Atlético Trujillo. Their first campaign in Primera División began with a 1–0 win over Zulia in Maracaibo, as well as victories against Deportivo Anzoátegui, Yaracuyanos, and a draw against Deportivo Táchira in San Cristóbal. Although Real Esppor's performance started to dwindle after that string of positive results, their results in the Clausura tournament were enough for them to ensure safety from relegation in their first season in Primera División as they placed 14th with 10 wins, 8 draws, and 16 losses.

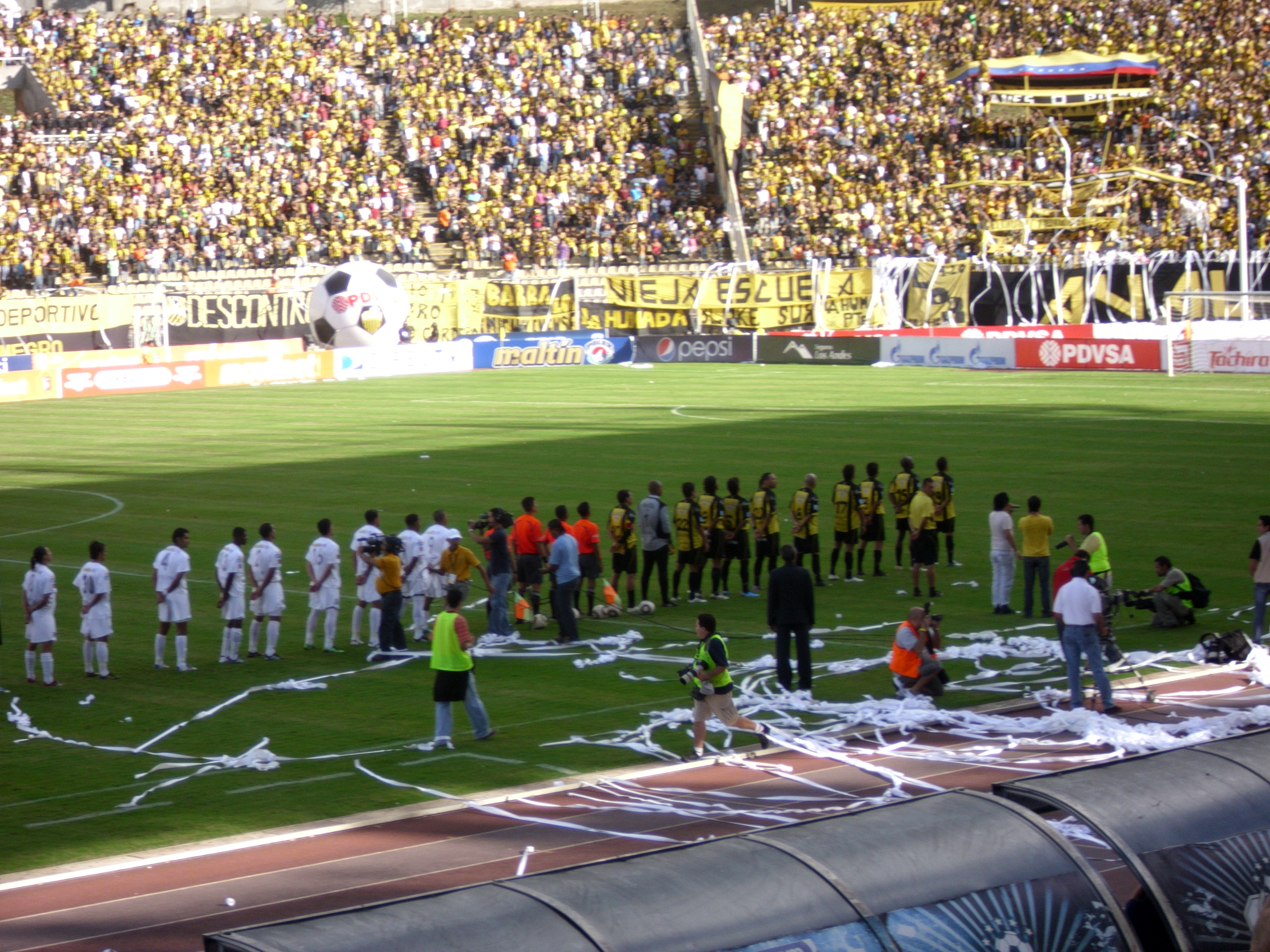
Real Esppor visiting Deportivo Táchira for their 2010 Apertura's 16th round match.

For the 2010–11 season, Real Esppor hired Noel Sanvicente as their new manager. In the Apertura, the team managed to stay on top of the table for most of the tournament, however losses to Caracas and Deportivo Táchira and draws against Carabobo and Trujillanos in the final five games allowed Deportivo Táchira to win the tournament on goal difference, leaving Real Esppor to settle for second place as both sides ended up tied with 36 points. In the Torneo Clausura, Real were not off to a good start, earning four points in their first four games which moved them away from the title race. They would then set their aims on getting a berth to the Copa Libertadores through the aggregate table, which would happen in case Caracas won the Clausura, however, Zamora beat Caracas on the last matchday to claim the Clausura title and forced Real Esppor to play the Serie Sudamericana for qualification to the Copa Sudamericana, where they defeated Carabobo in the first round but were ultimately beaten to a berth by Deportivo Anzoátegui.

The following season was not as successful, as the club's financial problems began to become apparent to the extent that the footballers refused to train until they received their payment. Due to these issues, manager Noel Sanvicente resigned on 2 December 2011, before the conclusion of the 2011 Apertura tournament, in which they ended in 12th place. Sanvicente was replaced by Charles López, who also had to deal with the club's economic crisis. The team finished the season in 14th place of the aggregate table, missing out on qualification for the Serie Sudamericana by two points but being nine points clear from relegation to Segunda División. In the 2012–13 season, Real Esppor's last season under that name, the team advanced to the Serie Sudamericana, where they lost at the hands of Mineros de Guayana.

=== Deportivo La Guaira ===
In August 2013, Real Esppor was taken over by new investors who rebranded it as Deportivo La Guaira as part of a project which included the change of crest and colors from white to purple (which was further changed to orange along with a new logo for the 2014–15 season) and eventually, a move to the Vargas state as a long-term goal. The team played its first game under its new name on 13 August 2013, a 3–1 loss to Deportivo Táchira at the Polideportivo de Pueblo Nuevo stadium and won its first game on 15 September, 1–0 against Llaneros de Guanare. Whilst they ended the 2013 Apertura in penultimate place, their fortunes improved in the Clausura tournament, in which a 10th place allowed them to advance to the Serie Sudamericana, where they defeated Tucanes de Amazonas and Carabobo to qualify for the 2014 Copa Sudamericana, their first participation in an international tournament. There they were knocked out by Colombian side Atlético Nacional in the first round after a 1–1 draw in Caracas and a narrow 1–0 defeat in Medellín.

Later that year, Deportivo La Guaira earned its first domestic accolade by winning the 2014 Copa Venezuela under the command of manager Leo González by beating Trujillanos on penalty kicks in the final. La Guaira successfully defended their Copa Venezuela title in 2015, defeating Deportivo Lara in the final, while also advancing to the second round of the Copa Sudamericana where they were defeated by Sportivo Luqueño from Paraguay. In the domestic league, they reached the finals of the 2015 Torneo Adecuación, losing to Zamora by a 2–1 aggregate score.

Deportivo La Guaira returned to the Copa Sudamericana in 2016, in which they became the first Venezuelan team to reach the round of 16. Playing their home matches in the competition at the Estadio Metropolitano de Cabudare due to remodeling works at the Estadio Olímpico de la UCV, the squad managed by Eduardo Saragó advanced past the first and second rounds by eliminating Deportes Tolima from Colombia and Emelec from Ecuador. They were eventually knocked out by Argentine side San Lorenzo by a 4–1 aggregate score.

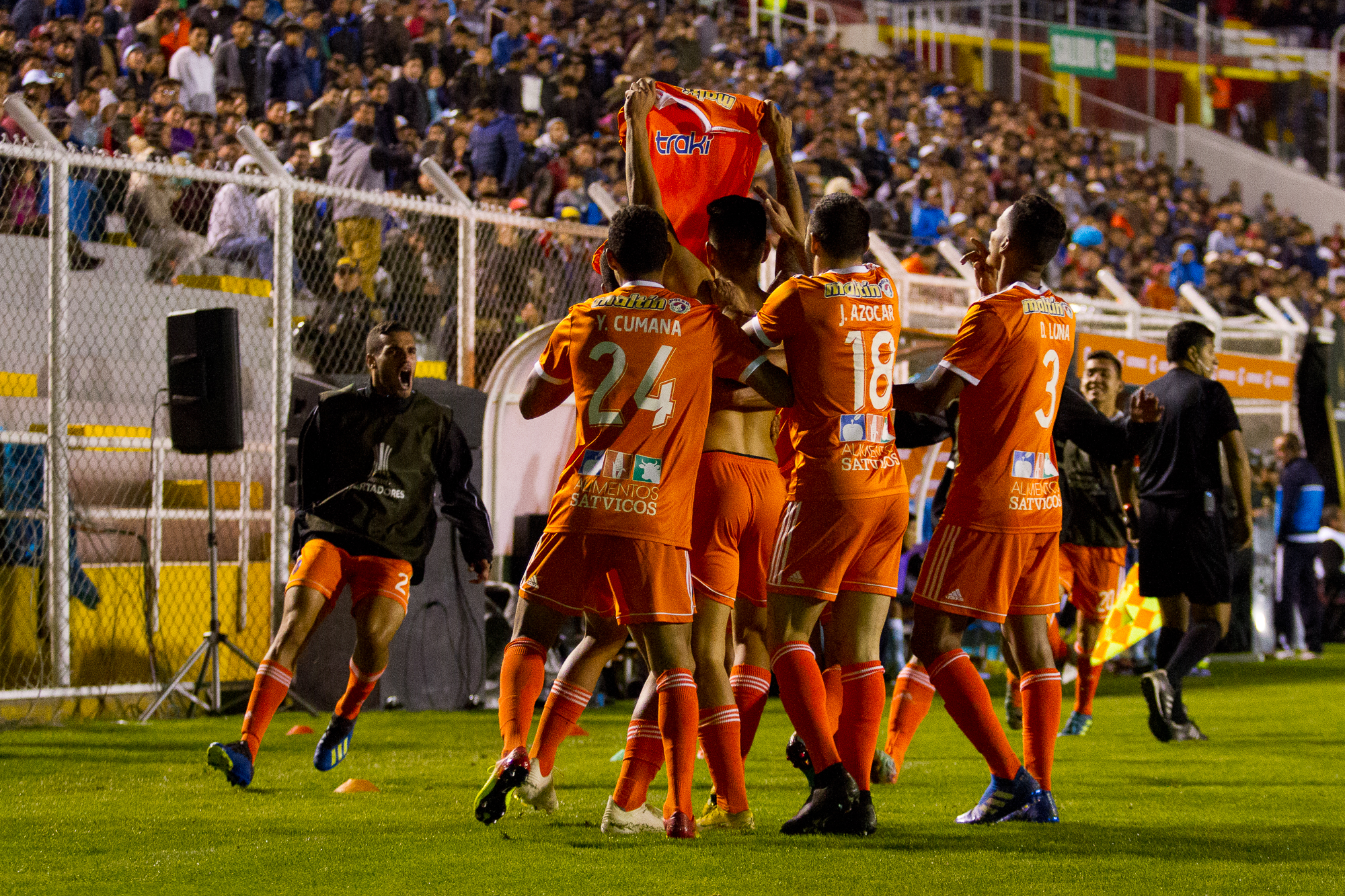
José Balza's goal in injury time against Real Garcilaso confirmed Deportivo La Guaira's qualification for the 2019 Copa Libertadores second stage.

After finishing in third place of the aggregate table of the 2018 season, La Guaira qualified for the Copa Libertadores for the first time. They started their participation in the first stage against Real Garcilaso from Peru, whom they defeated in the first leg in Caracas by a 1–0 score. In the second leg played at Estadio Garcilaso in Cusco, they found themselves trailing 2–0 against Real Garcilaso, but a late goal by José Balza helped them advance on away goals despite losing the match since the aggregate score ended tied 2–2. La Guaira were eventually knocked out in the following stage of the competition by Atlético Nacional.

In 2020, Deportivo La Guaira won their first league title. Led by manager Daniel Farías, with a young squad aged 24 on average, and displaying a direct style of play, Los Naranjas managed to advance to the Torneo Normalización final by winning Group A with 33 points. In that final match, played at Estadio Misael Delgado in Valencia, they faced the Group B winners Deportivo Táchira, whom they beat by a 2–0 score with goals by Martín García and Charlis Ortiz.

== Stadium ==
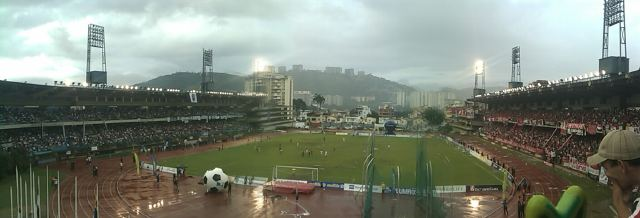
Estadio Brígido Iriarte during a match between Real Esppor and Caracas

Since their rebranding in 2013, Deportivo La Guaira have played their home matches at the Estadio Olímpico de la UCV in Caracas given the lack of suitable sports infrastructure in the Vargas state. As Real Esppor, their home stadium was Estadio Brígido Iriarte, also located in the Venezuelan capital.

== Titles ==
- Venezuelan Primera División: 1

2020

- Copa Venezuela: 3

2014, 2015, 2024

- Supercopa de Venezuela: 1

2025

== Current first team squad ==
As of 19 November 2026

Note: Flags indicate national team as defined under FIFA eligibility rules; some limited exceptions apply. Players may hold more than one non-FIFA nationality.

No.	Pos.	Nation	Player
1	GK	VEN	Cristopher Varela
2	DF	VEN	Carlos Rojas
4	DF	VEN	Carlos Rivero
6	MF	VEN	Carlos Faya
7	FW	VEN	José Meza (captain)
8	MF	VEN	Juan Luis Perdomo
9	FW	VEN	Anthony Uribe
10	MF	VEN	Juan Castellano
11	FW	VEN	Jesús González
12	GK	VEN	Jorge Sánchez
13	MF	VEN	Rommell Ibarra
14	MF	VEN	Cesar Da Silva
15	MF	VEN	Miguel González
16	DF	VEN	Luis Casimiro Peña

No.	Pos.	Nation	Player
19	DF	VEN	Genderson Ascanio
22	FW	VEN	Manuel Sulbarán
23	FW	COL	Juan Herrera
24	DF	ARG	Guillermo Ortiz
27	MF	VEN	José Correa
28	DF	VEN	Maike Villero
30	FW	ARG	Sebastián Zeballos
33	DF	VEN	Nelson Hernández
36	FW	COL	Flabián Londoño
37	FW	VEN	Maiken González
39	DF	ARG	Matías Orihuela
51	MF	VEN	Helzon Pomozy
67	FW	VEN	Gabriel Vargas
—	DF	ARG	Tobías Quiroz (on loan from Lanús)

=== Out on loan ===
Note: Flags indicate national team as defined under FIFA eligibility rules; some limited exceptions apply. Players may hold more than one non-FIFA nationality.

No.	Pos.	Nation	Player
—	FW	VEN	Yackson Rivas (at Kryvbas Kryvyi Rih until 30 July 2027)
