= Daniel Benítez (Paraguayan footballer) =

Paraguayan footballer (born 1979)

Personal information
- Date of birth: November 13, 1979 (age 46)
- Place of birth: Mariano Roque Alonso, Paraguay
- Height: 1.85 m (6 ft 1 in)
- Position: Defender

Senior career*
Years	Team	Apps	(Gls)
2006	Rubio Ñú		
2007	General Díaz		
2007–2008	Central Norte	15	(0)
2008	Imbabura	14	(1)
2009	LDU Loja	4	(1)
2010–2011	Guabirá	7	(0)
- * Club domestic league appearances and goals

Daniel Benítez (born November 13, 1979, in Mariano Roque Alonso) is a Paraguayan footballer who played as a defender for Guabirá of the Primera División in Bolivia.

== Teams ==
- Rubio Ñú 2006
- General Díaz 2007
- Central Norte 2007–2008
- Imbabura 2008
- LDU Loja 2009
- Guabirá 2010–2011
