= Óscar Gil =

Óscar Gil may refer to:

- Óscar Gil (footballer, born 1995), Spanish football centre-back for Racing Santander
- Óscar Gil (footballer, born 1998), Spanish football right-back for Oud-Heverlee Leuven
