= 2015 Venezuelan Primera División season =

Liga Movistar
- Season: 2015
- Champions: Zamora

The 2015 Primera División season (Torneo de Adecuación) is the 34th professional season of Venezuela's top-flight football league.

== Teams ==
Locations of the 20115 Primera División teams

Team	City	Stadium
Aragua	Maracay	Olímpico Hermanos Ghersi Páez
Atlético Venezuela	Caracas	Brígido Iriarte
Carabobo	Valencia	Misael Delgado
Caracas	Caracas	Olímpico de la UCV
Deportivo Anzoátegui	Puerto La Cruz	José Antonio Anzoátegui
Deportivo Lara	Barquisimeto	Metropolitano de Barquisimeto
Deportivo Petare	Caracas	Olímpico de la UCV
Deportivo Táchira	San Cristóbal	Polideportivo de Pueblo Nuevo
Estudiantes de Caracas	Caracas	Brígido Iriarte
Estudiantes de Mérida	Mérida	Metropolitano de Mérida
La Guaira	Caracas	Olímpico de la UCV
Llaneros	Guanare	Rafael Calles Pinto
Metropolitanos	Caracas	Olímpico de la UCV
Mineros	Ciudad Guayana	Polideportivo Cachamay
Portuguesa	Acarigua	General José Antonio Paez
Trujillanos	Valera	Luis Loreto Lira
Tucanes	Puerto Ayacucho	Antonio José de Sucre
Ureña	Ureña	Polideportivo de Pueblo Nuevo
Zamora	Barinas	Agustín Tovar
Zulia	Maracaibo	José "Pachencho" Romero

== Torneo de Adecuación ==
The Torneo de Adecuación will be the tournament of the season. It began on July 12, 2015 and ended on December 13, 2015.

=== Standings ===
Pos	Team	Pld	W	D	L	GF	GA	GD	Pts	Qualification or relegation
1	Deportivo La Guaira	19	12	6	1	35	13	+22	42	Quarterfinals
2	Zamora (C)	19	12	4	3	43	22	+21	40	Quarterfinals
3	Deportivo Táchira	19	8	9	2	37	17	+20	33	Quarterfinals
4	Zulia	19	8	9	2	32	16	+16	33	Quarterfinals
5	Aragua	19	9	5	5	25	20	+5	32	Quarterfinals
6	Mineros	19	8	7	4	33	20	+13	31	Quarterfinals
7	Caracas	19	7	10	2	23	10	+13	31	Quarterfinals
8	Deportivo Lara	19	9	4	6	26	22	+4	31	Quarterfinals
9	Trujillanos	19	8	6	5	25	22	+3	30	
10	Deportivo Anzoátegui	19	7	3	9	24	26	−2	24	
11	Estudiantes de Caracas	19	5	9	5	18	27	−9	24	
12	Carabobo	19	4	11	4	16	16	0	23	
13	Llaneros	19	5	7	7	20	21	−1	22	
14	Portuguesa	19	6	2	11	22	27	−5	20	
15	Estudiantes de Mérida	19	5	4	10	16	25	−9	19	
16	Atlético Venezuela	19	4	4	11	17	28	−11	16	
17	Ureña	19	3	7	9	18	40	−22	16	
18	Deportivo Petare	19	3	6	10	11	32	−21	15	
19	Metropolitanos (R)	19	4	2	13	14	30	−16	14	Relegation Playoff
20	Tucanes (R)	19	3	5	11	12	33	−21	14	Segunda División

Rules for classification: 1) points; 2) goal difference; 3) number of goals scored.
(C) Champions; (R) Relegated

=== Knockout rounds ===
Quarterfinals
1	Deportivo La Guaira	2	2	4
8	Deportivo Lara	0	0	0
4	Zulia	0	1	1
5	Aragua	0	1	1
2	Zamora	1	3	4
7	Caracas	1	1	2
3	Deportivo Táchira	1	2	3
6	Mineros	4	0	4

Semifinals
1	Deportivo La Guaira	2	2	4
5	Aragua	0	0	0
2	Zamora	3	4	7
6	Mineros	2	1	3

Finals
1	Deportivo La Guaira	0	1	1
2	Zamora	2	0	2

=== Relegation playoff ===
Team #1	Points	Team #2	1st leg	2nd leg	Playoff
Metropolitanos	2:2	JBL del Zulia	2–2	1–1	–
