= 2014–15 Venezuelan Primera División season =

Liga Movistar
- Season: 2014–15
- Champions: Deportivo Táchira (8th Title)

The 2014–15 Primera División season is the 33rd professional season of Venezuela's top-flight football league.

== Teams ==
Eighteen teams participated this season, sixteen of whom remain from the previous season. Atlético El Vigía and Yaracuyanos were relegated after accumulating the fewest points in the 2013–14 season aggregate table. They will be replaced by Metropolitanos and Portuguesa, the 2013–14 Segunda División winner and runner-up, respectively.

Locations of the 2014–15 Primera División teams

Team	City	Stadium
Aragua	Maracay	Olímpico Hermanos Ghersi Páez
Atlético Venezuela	Caracas	Brígido Iriarte
Carabobo	Valencia	Misael Delgado
Caracas	Caracas	Olímpico de la UCV
Deportivo Anzoátegui	Puerto La Cruz	José Antonio Anzoátegui
Deportivo Lara	Barquisimeto	Metropolitano de Barquisimeto
Deportivo Petare	Caracas	Olímpico de la UCV
Deportivo Táchira	San Cristóbal	Polideportivo de Pueblo Nuevo
Estudiantes	Mérida	Metropolitano de Mérida
La Guaira	Caracas	Brígido Iriarte
Metropolitanos	Caracas	Brígido Iriarte
Mineros	Ciudad Guayana	Polideportivo Cachamay
Llaneros	Guanare	Rafael Calles Pinto
Portuguesa	Acarigua	General José Antonio Paez
Trujillanos	Valera	Luis Loreto Lira
Tucanes	Puerto Ayacucho	Antonio José de Sucre
Zamora	Barinas	Agustín Tovar
Zulia	Maracaibo	José "Pachencho" Romero

== Torneo Apertura ==
The Torneo Apertura will be the first tournament of the season. It began in August 2014 and ended in December 2014.

=== Standings ===
Pos	Team	Pld	W	D	L	GF	GA	GD	Pts	Qualification
1	Trujillanos	17	11	3	3	27	15	+12	36	Serie Final and the 2016 Copa Libertadores Second Stage
2	La Guaira	17	10	5	2	25	13	+12	35	
3	Caracas	17	9	4	4	33	16	+17	31	
4	Aragua	17	9	4	4	30	22	+8	31	
5	Deportivo Anzoátegui	17	8	3	6	28	15	+13	27	
6	Mineros	17	6	7	4	20	16	+4	25	
7	Tucanes	17	7	4	6	16	19	−3	25	
8	Deportivo Lara	17	5	9	3	25	18	+7	24	
9	Carabobo	17	5	9	3	21	20	+1	24	
10	Estudiantes	17	6	6	5	20	21	−1	24	
11	Deportivo Táchira	17	6	5	6	24	16	+8	23	
12	Zamora	17	5	7	5	19	19	0	22	
13	Atlético Venezuela	17	4	6	7	14	20	−6	18	
14	Metropolitanos	17	3	6	8	16	29	−13	15	
15	Deportivo Petare	17	2	9	6	8	17	−9	12	
16	Llaneros	17	3	3	11	12	30	−18	12	
17	Zulia	17	2	5	10	12	27	−15	11	
18	Portuguesa	17	1	7	9	11	28	−17	10	

== Torneo Clausura ==
The Torneo Clausura will be the second tournament of the season. It began in February 2015 and ended in May 2015.

=== Standings ===
Pos	Team	Pld	W	D	L	GF	GA	GD	Pts	Qualification
1	Deportivo Táchira	17	13	2	2	39	16	+23	41	Serie Final and the 2016 Copa Libertadores Second Stage
2	Caracas	17	12	3	2	23	11	+12	39	
3	Zamora	17	11	3	3	29	14	+15	36	
4	Deportivo Anzoátegui	17	9	4	4	31	23	+8	31	
5	Deportivo Lara	17	7	7	3	22	18	+4	28	
6	Mineros	17	7	4	6	23	23	0	25	
7	La Guaira	17	7	3	7	22	19	+3	24	
8	Aragua	17	6	4	7	25	25	0	22	
9	Atlético Venezuela	17	5	6	6	17	15	+2	21	
10	Zulia	17	6	3	8	14	18	−4	21	
11	Trujillanos	17	5	5	7	15	20	−5	20	
12	Metropolitanos	17	5	4	8	21	26	−5	19	
13	Deportivo Petare	17	4	4	9	7	14	−7	16	
14	Tucanes	17	3	7	7	6	22	−16	16	
15	Carabobo	17	4	3	10	20	26	−6	15	
16	Llaneros	17	4	2	11	24	32	−8	14	
17	Estudiantes	17	6	4	7	18	21	−3	13	
18	Portuguesa	17	3	4	10	17	30	−13	13	

== Aggregate table ==
Pos	Team	Pld	W	D	L	GF	GA	GD	Pts	Qualification
1	Caracas	34	21	7	6	56	27	+29	70	2016 Copa Libertadores First Stage
2	Deportivo Táchira	34	19	7	8	64	33	+31	64	2016 Copa Libertadores Second Stage
3	La Guaira	34	17	8	9	48	33	+15	59	2015 Copa Sudamericana First Stage
4	Deportivo Anzoátegui	34	17	7	10	59	38	+21	58	2015 Copa Sudamericana First Stage
5	Zamora	34	16	10	8	48	33	+15	58	Qualified to the Serie Sudamericana
6	Trujillanos	34	16	8	10	42	35	+7	56	2016 Copa Libertadores Second Stage
7	Aragua	34	15	8	11	55	47	+8	53	Qualified to the Serie Sudamericana
8	Deportivo Lara	34	12	16	6	47	36	+11	52	Qualified to the Serie Sudamericana
9	Mineros	34	13	11	10	43	39	+4	50	Qualified to the Serie Sudamericana
10	Tucanes	34	10	11	13	22	41	−19	41	Qualified to the Serie Sudamericana
11	Atlético Venezuela	34	9	12	13	31	35	−4	39	Qualified to the Serie Sudamericana
12	Carabobo	34	9	12	13	41	46	−5	39	Qualified to the Serie Sudamericana
13	Estudiantes	34	12	10	12	38	42	−4	46	Qualified to the Serie Sudamericana
14	Metropolitanos	34	8	10	16	37	55	−18	34	
15	Zulia	34	8	8	18	26	45	−19	32	
16	Deportivo Petare	34	6	13	15	15	31	−16	31	
17	Llaneros	34	7	5	22	36	62	−26	26	
18	Portuguesa	34	4	11	19	28	58	−30	23	

Rules for classification: 1) points; 2) goal difference; 3) number of goals scored.

== Serie Final ==
Deportivo Táchira and Trujillanos qualified to the Serie Final, which was contested on a home and away basis.

Pos	Team	Pld	W	D	L	GF	GA	GD	Pts
1	Deportivo Táchira	2	1	1	0	1	0	+1	4
2	Trujillanos	2	0	1	1	0	1	−1	1

Rules for classification: 1st points; 2nd goals scored; 3rd away goals; 4th penalty shoot-out.

== Serie Sudamericana ==
Other than the teams which already qualify for the Copa Libertadores (Apertura and Clausura champions and the best-placed team in the aggregate table) and the Copa Sudamericana (Copa Venezuela champion and the second best-placed team in the aggregate table), the eight best-placed teams in the aggregate table will contest in the Serie Sudamericana for the remaining two berths to the Copa Sudamericana, which qualify the two winners to the First Stage.

In the first round, the matchups are:

- Match A (1 vs. 8)
- Match B (2 vs. 7)
- Match C (3 vs. 6)
- Match D (4 vs. 5)

In the second round, the matchups are:

- Winner A vs. Winner C
- Winner B vs. Winner D

For the two second round winners, the team with the better record in the aggregate table will receive the Venezuela 3 berth, while the other team will receive the Venezuela 4 berth.

=== First round ===
==== Match A ====
Pos	Team	Pld	W	D	L	GF	GA	GD	Pts	Qualification
1	Zamora	2	2	0	0	6	3	+3	6	Second round
2	Estudiantes	2	0	0	2	3	6	−3	0	

Rules for classification: 1st points; 2nd goals scored; 3rd away goals; 4th penalty shoot-out.

==== Match B ====
Pos	Team	Pld	W	D	L	GF	GA	GD	Pts	Qualification
1	Mineros	2	1	1	0	3	0	+3	4	Second round
2	Tucanes	2	0	1	1	0	3	−3	1	

Rules for classification: 1st points; 2nd goals scored; 3rd away goals; 4th penalty shoot-out.

==== Match C ====
Pos	Team	Pld	W	D	L	GF	GA	GD	Pts	Qualification
1	Carabobo	2	1	1	0	1	0	+1	4	Second round
2	Aragua	2	0	1	1	0	1	−1	1	

Rules for classification: 1st points; 2nd goals scored; 3rd away goals; 4th penalty shoot-out.

==== Match D ====
Pos	Team	Pld	W	D	L	GF	GA	GD	Pts	Qualification
1	Deportivo Lara	2	1	0	1	2	1	+1	3	Second round
2	Atlético Venezuela	2	1	0	1	1	2	−1	3	

Rules for classification: 1st points; 2nd goals scored; 3rd away goals; 4th penalty shoot-out.

=== Second round ===
==== Winner A vs. Winner B ====
Pos	Team	Pld	W	D	L	GF	GA	GD	Pts	Qualification
1	Zamora	2	2	0	0	6	4	+2	6	2015 Copa Sudamericana First Stage
2	Mineros	2	0	0	2	4	6	−2	0	

Rules for classification: 1st points; 2nd goals scored; 3rd away goals; 4th penalty shoot-out.

==== Winner C vs. Winner D ====
Pos	Team	Pld	W	D	L	GF	GA	GD	Pts	Qualification
1	Carabobo	2	1	0	1	1	1	0	3	2015 Copa Sudamericana First Stage
2	Deportivo Lara	2	1	0	1	1	1	0	3	

Rules for classification: 1st points; 2nd goals scored; 3rd away goals; 4th penalty shoot-out.
