= 2013–14 Venezuelan Primera División season =

Liga Movistar
- Season: 2013–14
- Champions: Zamora (2nd title)
- 2015 Copa Libertadores: Zamora; Mineros; Deportivo Táchira
- 2014 Copa Sudamericana: Caracas (cup winner); Deportivo Anzoátegui; Trujillanos; La Guaira

The 2013–14 Primera División season was the 32nd professional season of Venezuela's top-flight football league.

== Teams ==
Eighteen teams participated this season, sixteen of whom remain from the previous season. Monagas and Portuguesa were relegated after accumulating the fewest points in the 2012–13 season aggregate table. They will be replaced by Carabobo and Tucanes, the 2012–13 Segunda División winner and runner-up, respectively.

Locations of the 2013–14 Primera División teams

Team	City	Stadium
Aragua	Maracay	Olímpico Hermanos Ghersi Páez
Atlético Venezuela	Caracas	Brígido Iriarte
Carabobo	Valencia	Misael Delgado
Caracas	Caracas	Olímpico de la UCV
Deportivo Anzoátegui	Puerto La Cruz	José Antonio Anzoátegui
Deportivo Lara	Barquisimeto	Metropolitano de Barquisimeto
El Vigía	El Vigía	Ramón "Gato" Hernández
Deportivo Petare	Caracas	Olímpico de la UCV
Deportivo Táchira	San Cristóbal	Polideportivo de Pueblo Nuevo
Estudiantes	Mérida	Metropolitano de Mérida
La Guaira	Caracas	Brígido Iriarte
Llaneros	Guanare	Rafael Calles Pinto
Mineros	Ciudad Guayana	Polideportivo Cachamay
Trujillanos	Valera	Luis Loreto Lira
Tucanes	Puerto Ayacucho	Antonio José de Sucre
Yaracuyanos	San Felipe	Florentino Oropeza
Zamora	Barinas	Agustín Tovar
Zulia	Maracaibo	José "Pachencho" Romero

== Torneo Apertura ==
The Torneo Apertura will be the first tournament of the season. It began in August 2013 and ended in December 2013.

=== Standings ===
Pos	Team	Pld	W	D	L	GF	GA	GD	Pts	Qualification
1	Mineros	17	11	5	1	28	15	+13	38	Serie Final and the 2015 Copa Libertadores Second Stage
2	Caracas	17	10	5	2	30	15	+15	35	
3	Zamora	17	9	6	2	22	11	+11	33	
4	Deportivo Anzoátegui	17	10	3	4	27	21	+6	33	
5	Carabobo	17	9	3	5	30	20	+10	30	
6	Deportivo Táchira	17	8	5	4	31	18	+13	29	
7	Atlético Venezuela	17	6	7	4	18	19	−1	25	
8	Estudiantes	17	5	7	5	21	28	−7	22	
9	Trujillanos	17	3	12	2	24	19	+5	21	
10	Aragua	17	5	5	7	26	25	+1	20	
11	Llaneros	17	5	4	8	21	25	−4	19	
12	Zulia	17	4	7	6	18	22	−4	19	
13	Deportivo Petare	17	3	9	5	14	19	−5	18	
14	Tucanes	17	4	5	8	23	28	−5	17	
15	Deportivo Lara	17	4	3	10	13	23	−10	15	
16	El Vigía	17	4	3	10	23	35	−12	15	
17	La Guaira	17	2	8	7	12	20	−8	14	
18	Yaracuyanos	17	1	3	13	15	33	−18	6	

== Torneo Clausura ==
The Torneo Clausura will be the second tournament of the season.

=== Standings ===
Pos	Team	Pld	W	D	L	GF	GA	GD	Pts	Qualification
1	Zamora	17	12	3	2	45	20	+25	39	Serie Final and the 2015 Copa Libertadores Second Stage
2	Mineros	17	11	4	2	28	12	+16	37	
3	Deportivo Táchira	17	11	4	2	32	20	+12	37	
4	Trujillanos	17	10	3	4	29	15	+14	33	
5	Tucanes	17	9	6	2	23	14	+9	33	
6	Deportivo Anzoátegui	17	7	6	4	25	17	+8	27	
7	Caracas	17	6	9	2	25	18	+7	27	
8	Deportivo Lara	17	5	9	3	25	17	+8	24	
9	Aragua	17	6	5	6	13	14	−1	23	
10	La Guaira	17	6	5	6	15	18	−3	23	
11	Atlético Venezuela	17	5	7	5	14	20	−6	22	
12	Carabobo	17	5	4	8	17	22	−5	19	
13	Deportivo Petare	17	4	5	8	14	20	−6	17	
14	Zulia	17	4	3	10	22	31	−9	15	
15	Llaneros	17	3	3	11	16	31	−15	12	
16	Yaracuyanos	17	2	4	11	14	30	−16	10	
17	Estudiantes	17	1	6	10	16	32	−16	9	
18	El Vigía	17	3	0	14	14	36	−22	9	

== Aggregate table ==
Pos	Team	Pld	W	D	L	GF	GA	GD	Pts	Qualification or relegation
1	Mineros	34	22	9	3	56	27	+29	75	2015 Copa Libertadores Second Stage
2	Zamora	34	21	9	4	67	31	+36	72	2015 Copa Libertadores Second Stage
3	Deportivo Táchira	34	19	9	6	63	38	+25	66	2015 Copa Libertadores First Stage
4	Caracas	34	16	14	4	55	33	+22	62	2014 Copa Sudamericana First Stage (Note: Caracas qualified for the 2013 Copa Sudamericana as the 2013 Copa Venezuela champion.)
5	Deportivo Anzoátegui	34	17	9	8	52	38	+14	60	2014 Copa Sudamericana First Stage
6	Trujillanos	34	13	15	6	53	34	+19	54	Qualified to the Serie Sudamericana
7	Tucanes	34	13	11	10	44	37	+7	50	Qualified to the Serie Sudamericana
8	Carabobo	34	14	7	13	47	42	+5	49	Qualified to the Serie Sudamericana
9	Atlético Venezuela	34	11	14	9	32	39	−7	47	Qualified to the Serie Sudamericana
10	Aragua	34	11	10	13	39	39	0	43	Qualified to the Serie Sudamericana
11	Deportivo Lara	34	9	12	13	38	40	−2	39	Qualified to the Serie Sudamericana
12	La Guaira	34	8	13	13	27	38	−11	37	Qualified to the Serie Sudamericana
13	Deportivo Petare	34	7	14	13	28	39	−11	35	Qualified to the Serie Sudamericana
14	Zulia	34	8	10	16	34	52	−18	34	
15	Llaneros	34	8	7	19	37	56	−19	31	
16	Estudiantes	34	6	13	15	37	60	−23	31	
17	El Vigía	34	7	3	24	36	71	−35	24	Relegated to the Segunda División
18	Yaracuyanos	34	3	7	24	29	63	−34	16	Relegated to the Segunda División

Rules for classification: 1) points; 2) goal difference; 3) number of goals scored.

== Serie Final ==
Mineros and Zamora qualified to the Serie Final, which was contested on a home and away basis.

Pos	Team	Pld	W	D	L	GF	GA	GD	Pts
1	Zamora	2	1	0	1	4	3	+1	3
2	Mineros	2	1	0	1	3	4	−1	3

Rules for classification: 1st points; 2nd goals scored; 3rd away goals; 4th penalty shoot-out.

Primera División
2013–14 Champion
Zamora
2nd title

== Serie Sudamericana ==
Other than the teams which already qualify for the Copa Libertadores (Apertura and Clausura champions and the best-placed team in the aggregate table) and the Copa Sudamericana (Copa Venezuela champion and the second best-placed team in the aggregate table), the eight best-placed teams in the aggregate table will contest in the Serie Sudamericana for the remaining two berths to the Copa Sudamericana, which qualify the two winners to the First Stage.

In the first round, the matchups are:

- Match A (1 vs. 8)
- Match B (2 vs. 7)
- Match C (3 vs. 6)
- Match D (4 vs. 5)

In the second round, the matchups are:

- Winner A vs. Winner C
- Winner B vs. Winner D

For the two second round winners, the team with the better record in the aggregate table will receive the Venezuela 3 berth, while the other team will receive the Venezuela 4 berth.

=== First round ===
==== Match A ====
Pos	Team	Pld	W	D	L	GF	GA	GD	Pts	Qualification
1	Trujillanos	2	2	0	0	7	0	+7	6	Second Round
2	Deportivo Petare	2	0	0	2	0	7	−7	0	

Rules for classification: 1st points; 2nd goals scored; 3rd away goals; 4th penalty shoot-out.

==== Match B ====
Pos	Team	Pld	W	D	L	GF	GA	GD	Pts	Qualification
1	Aragua	2	1	1	0	2	1	+1	4	Second Round
2	Atlético Venezuela	2	0	1	1	1	2	−1	1	

Rules for classification: 1st points; 2nd goals scored; 3rd away goals; 4th penalty shoot-out.

==== Match C ====
Pos	Team	Pld	W	D	L	GF	GA	GD	Pts	Qualification
1	La Guaira	2	1	0	1	3	2	+1	3	Second Round
2	Tucanes	2	1	0	1	2	3	−1	3	

Rules for classification: 1st points; 2nd goals scored; 3rd away goals; 4th penalty shoot-out.

==== Match D ====
Pos	Team	Pld	W	D	L	GF	GA	GD	Pts	Qualification
1	Carabobo	2	1	0	1	3	1	+2	3	Second Round
2	Deportivo Lara	2	1	0	1	1	3	−2	3	

Rules for classification: 1st points; 2nd goals scored; 3rd away goals; 4th penalty shoot-out.

=== Second round ===
==== Winner A vs. Winner C ====
Pos	Team	Pld	W	D	L	GF	GA	GD	Pts	Qualification
1	Trujillanos	2	1	1	0	6	1	+5	4	2014 Copa Sudamericana First Stage
2	Aragua	2	0	1	1	1	6	−5	1	

Rules for classification: 1st points; 2nd goals scored; 3rd away goals; 4th penalty shoot-out.

==== Winner B vs. Winner D ====
Pos	Team	Pld	W	D	L	GF	GA	GD	Pts	Qualification
1	La Guaira	2	0	2	0	0	0	0	2	2014 Copa Sudamericana First Stage
2	Carabobo	2	0	2	0	0	0	0	2	

Rules for classification: 1st points; 2nd goals scored; 3rd away goals; 4th penalty shoot-out.
