= Asociación Civil Deportivo Lara =

Venezuelan football club

Deportivo Lara
- Full name: Asociación Civil Deportivo Lara
- Nickname: Rojinegro
- Founded: 2 July 2009; 17 years ago
- Ground: Estadio Metropolitano de Cabudare; Cabudare, Venezuela
- Capacity: 47,913
- Chairman: Jose Antonio Quintero
- Manager: José María Morr
- League: Liga FUTVE 2
- 2022: Liga FUTVE, 12th
- Website: http://www.deportivolara.com/
Home colours	Away colours	Third colours

Asociación Civil Deportivo Lara (usually called Deportivo Lara, ACD Lara or just Lara) is a professional football club based in Barquisimeto, Lara State, that played in the Venezuelan league for the first time in 2009, in their first year of existence.

It was one of four teams that has won the Venezuelan Primera División championship by winning both short tournaments of the season as well as being the team that has accrued the most points in a season, when it obtained 83 points in the 2011–12 campaign, under the reins of Eduardo Saragó and the help of players with experience in the Venezuela national team such as Miguel Mea Vitali, José Manuel Rey and Rafael Castellín.

One of the club's most significant milestones was achieved on March 1, 2018, in their first 2018 Copa Libertadores match, when they beat the top winner of the competition Independiente 1–0 with a goal by Carlos Sierra.

== History ==
Club Deportivo Lara was founded on July 2, 2009, by Arid García, Luís Yépez, Juan Conde, and Carlos Eduardo Hernández to maintain a Venezuelan Primera División team in the Lara State as the former team Guaros de Lara had been struggling financially and eventually disappeared. The new team was created under the slogan "Believe in Lara."

In its first year in the top flight, the team placed in the top four of the cumulative overall, just behind Caracas, Deportivo Táchira and Deportivo Italia, the latter having its title aspirations severed by the team in both the Apertura and Clausura.

=== First international participation ===
On May 9, 2010, the team sealed its qualification for the 2010 Copa Sudamericana, after placing fourth in the 2009–10 season's aggregate table, bringing back an international tournament to the Lara state after 44 years when Lara FC did so in 1966 but in the Copa Libertadores back then.

Deportivo Lara played their first leg at home on August 17 against Colombia's Santa Fe at the Estadio Metropolitano de Cabudare with a favorable outcome for the local 2–0, and the second leg was held at El Campín in Bogotá on Thursday August 26. There, the club could not maintain their lead and fell by the score of 4–0 leaving the competition with an aggregate score of 4–2 in favor of Santa Fe.

=== First title ===
In December 2010 the club hired coach German "Basílico" González, who brought a new coaching staff including Arturo Boyacá and Óscar Gil as technical assistants. After poor results González left the club, and Óscar Gil took the helm.

Gil took over the club in Week 14 against Estudiantes de Mérida in which he took the win 1–0 at the Metropolitano de Cabudare stadium, then faced Caroní at Cachamay winning 0–3, then a defeat at home to Monagas 1–3 and finishing the tournament with a 0–4 win in a game played in Caracas. Previously, he had served as interim coach in the win against Yaracuyanos by a score of 1–4, which gave him one of the first joys to all Lara fans.

But Gil decided not to stay for the upcoming season, although the Red & Black would not be too long without coach, since on June 3, 2011, coach Eduardo Saragó signed for three seasons with the club. That same day a press conference was held to open the club's new headquarters. This began a promising project, as it had taken in consideration the youth teams of the club, and there were transfers of experienced players such as Miguel Mea Vitali, Edgar Pérez Greco, Rafael Castellín, David McIntosh, Vicente Suanno, José Manuel Rey, Norman Baquero, Marcelo Maidana, Bladimir Morales, and for a long-term project which made them long contracts.

After a dream season, the Red & Black became overall champions of the 2011–12 Venezuelan Primera División after winning the 2011 Apertura unbeaten by beating Mineros de Guayana with a 5–1 score, and also winning the 2012 Clausura by defeating Mineros de Guayana again, this time by a 1–0 score. Thus, Deportivo Lara closed the season as the third team in Venezuelan football history to win both tournaments in a season (after Caracas did so in 2003–04 and Unión Atlético Maracaibo who did it in 2004–05) and the first team to do so since the expansion of teams in 2007, with an accumulated campaign of 25 wins, 8 draws and just one loss, accumulating 83 points (record of points obtained in a Venezuelan football season), which allowed them to obtain qualification for both the 2012 Copa Sudamericana and the 2013 Copa Libertadores.

Due to family issues, Eduardo Saragó decided not to continue in charge of the team, and his assistant Lenín Bastidas was promoted to head coach in the hopes of guaranteeing the long-term success of the process started with Saragó.

=== First economic crisis and success in short tournaments ===
After the end of the 2011–12 season, the club started experiencing financial problems due to an investigation opened on Arid García, owner of the club at the moment, which made it accumulate a debt of 30 million bolívars. In spite of the situation, the team's on-field performances were still positive, and the club was eventually taken over by the Lara state government, which stabilized its financial situation and later sold it to businessman Énder Luzardo in 2013.

Coach Rafael Dudamel was appointed as manager for the 2014 Clausura tournament, and with him at the helm Deportivo Lara made it to the Serie Sudamericana in 2015 and also advanced to the final of the 2015 Copa Venezuela, which they lost against Deportivo La Guaira, whilst in that same year they made it to the knockout stage of the 2015 Adecuación tournament, losing to that same team in the quarter-finals. Dudamel left the team in 2016, after being appointed as Venezuela national football team coach.

In that same year, Luzardo transferred his shares in the club to Jorge Giménez and Silvio Ochoa, who brought Leonardo González as new manager. With González at the helm, Deportivo Lara advanced to the final stages of the 2016 Clausura and the Copa Venezuela semifinals, and won the 2017 Clausura tournament, defeating Mineros de Guayana in the final. The victory in the Clausura qualified Deportivo Lara for the season's Serie Final, where they faced the Apertura winners Monagas. Despite having won the first leg in Maturín by a 1–0 score, Deportivo Lara were denied their second Primera División title as Monagas won the second leg at the Estadio Metropolitano de Cabudare by a 2–0 score. The runner-up finish in the 2017 season allowed Deportivo Lara to qualify for the group stage of the 2018 Copa Libertadores, where they placed last in their group despite getting two wins at home against Independiente and Colombian side Millonarios.

In 2018 Deportivo Lara once again won the Clausura tournament, beating Deportivo La Guaira in the final, but ended up as season runners-up again after losing the Serie Final to Zamora, and in 2020 they defeated Caracas to claim third place in the season.

=== Second crisis, hiatus and return ===
In July 2021 Jorge Giménez was elected as president of the Venezuelan Football Federation (FVF) and left the club, being replaced by Daniel Villasmil, who in turn passed the baton to Khalil Yusef in March 2022. The club began to fall behind in its payments, while at the same time the situation on the field was not much better as the team drifted through the bottom of the table in the league season. Manager Eduardo Saragó, who returned to the club after being signed in July, resigned just one week after taking over upon noticing the financial situation of the club's players. Saragó was replaced by Jesús Ortiz, with whom Deportivo Lara started a comeback that allowed them to avoid relegation and also qualify for the final stages of the competition, narrowly missing out on a Copa Sudamericana berth.

By the start of 2023, and with Deportivo Lara's debts already totaling more than a million USD and some of the club's players and staff announcing their departure, club president Yusef agreed to hand over the administration of the club to the Lara state government until a new owner could be found. However, that debt played a major factor in leading the FVF to refuse granting Deportivo Lara the club license required to compete in the 2023 Primera División season. The club did not enter any competition for the 2023 season, due to its administrative issues.

Deportivo Lara remained on hiatus in 2024, but the club's potential return to professional activity starting from the 2025 season was announced on 11 December 2024 at a press conference held at the Estadio Metropolitano de Cabudare and led by Jose Antonio Quintero as new club chairman. Quintero announced that the club's administrative and legal issues were being solved and the club's debts were being paid as a mandatory requirement to apply for a license that would allow the club to play at professional level once again.

Although the club also stayed out for the 2025 season, on 17 December 2025 the return to activity of Deportivo Lara was confirmed with the team entering the second tier league Liga FUTVE 2 for the 2026 season.

== Recent seasons ==
Year	Division	Position
2009–10	Primera División	4th
2010–11	Primera División	13th
2011–12	Primera División	1st
2012–13	Primera División	4th
2013–14	Primera División	11th
2014–15	Primera División	8th
2015	Primera División	8th
2016	Primera División	8th
2017	Primera División	2nd

== Titles ==
- Primera División Venezolana
  - Professional Era (1): 2012

== Performance in CONMEBOL competitions ==
- Copa Libertadores: 3 appearances

2013: Group Stage
2018: Group Stage
2019: Group Stage

- Copa Sudamericana: 3 appearances

2010: First Round
2012: First Round
2013: First Round

== Current squad ==
As of 6 March 2022

Note: Flags indicate national team as defined under FIFA eligibility rules; some limited exceptions apply. Players may hold more than one non-FIFA nationality.

No.	Pos.	Nation	Player
2	DF	VEN	Diego Meleán
3	DF	VEN	Ignacio Anzola
4	DF	VEN	Victor Sifontes
5	MF	VEN	Bernaldo Manzano
6	MF	VEN	Telasco Segovia
7	FW	VEN	Rubén Rojas
8	MF	VEN	Aristóteles Romero
9	FW	VEN	Bryan Castillo
10	FW	VEN	Freddy Vargas
11	MF	VEN	Johan Moreno
12	GK	VEN	Jean Ambuila
13	DF	VEN	Henri Pernía
14	DF	VEN	Cristopher Rodríguez

No.	Pos.	Nation	Player
15	MF	VEN	Darvis Rodríguez
16	MF	VEN	Edgar Pérez
17	DF	VEN	Rodney Chirinos
19	FW	VEN	Jean Franco Castillo
21	FW	VEN	Johan Arrieche
24	DF	VEN	Aarón Rodríguez
25	GK	VEN	Luis Curiel (captain)
26	MF	CHI	Lucas Martínez
27	MF	PAN	Jhamal Rodríguez
28	MF	VEN	Manuel Palma
29	FW	VEN	Yanowsky Reyes
30	MF	VEN	Luis Urbina

=== Out on loan ===
Note: Flags indicate national team as defined under FIFA eligibility rules; some limited exceptions apply. Players may hold more than one non-FIFA nationality.

No.	Pos.	Nation	Player

== Managers ==
- (Colombia) Jaime de la Pava (July 1, 2007 – Dec 31, 2007)
- (Colombia) Germán González (Dec 14, 2010 – May 1, 2012)
- (Venezuela) Eduardo Saragó (July 1, 2011 – Dec 12, 2012)
- (Venezuela) Lenín Bastidas (Dec 24, 2012 – Dec 31, 2013)
- (Venezuela) Rafael Dudamel (Dec 15, 2013–15)
- (Venezuela) Alí Cañas (Ene 1– 2016 – July 26, 2017 )
- (Venezuela) Leo González (July 31, 2017 – Dec 20, 2020)
- (Argentina) Martín Brignani (Jan 25, 2021 – )

== See also ==
- Venezuelan Primera División
