= Tucanes de Amazonas F.C. =

Venezuelan football club

Tucanes
- Full name: Tucanes de Amazonas Fútbol Club
- Founded: 2008
- Dissolved: 2018
- Ground: Antonio José de Sucre; Puerto Ayacucho, Venezuela
- Capacity: 10,000
- Chairman: Yudith Campos
- Manager: Daniel Nikolac
- League: Primera División Venezolana
- Segunda División: 2nd (Promoted)
Home colours	Away colours

Tucanes de Amazonas Fútbol Club (usually called Tucanes de Amazonas) were a professional club promoted to the Primera División Venezolana in 2011. They were based in Puerto Ayacucho.

== Titles ==
- Primera División Venezolana: 0

Amateur Era (0):
Professional Era (0):

- Segunda División Venezolana: (1): 2013
- Segunda División B Venezolana: 0
- Tercera División Venezolana: 0
- Copa de Venezuela: 0

== Current first team squad ==
Note: Flags indicate national team as defined under FIFA eligibility rules; some limited exceptions apply. Players may hold more than one non-FIFA nationality.

No.	Pos.	Nation	Player
—	GK	VEN	Lioniger Guarulla
—	GK	VEN	Luigi Palomino
—	GK	VEN	Carlos Angelini
—	DF	VEN	Luiyi Anaya
—	DF	VEN	Baisi Arquímides
—	DF	VEN	Javier Bolívar
—	DF	VEN	Heeynen Cortéz
—	DF	VEN	Robert Díaz
—	DF	VEN	Eduard Navas
—	DF	VEN	Yerson Payema
—	DF	VEN	Raul Vallona
—	DF	VEN	Andy Rizzo
—	DF	VEN	Juan Rincones
—	DF	VEN	José Romero
—	MF	COL	Edwin Ávila

No.	Pos.	Nation	Player
—	MF	VEN	Jesús Ceballos
—	MF	VEN	Umawaly Guarulla
—	MF	VEN	Alejandro Londoño
—	MF	VEN	Richard López
—	MF	COL	Leslie Orozco
—	MF	VEN	Orlando Perez
—	MF	VEN	Hermes Saliyas
—	MF	VEN	Carlos Sánchez
—	MF	VEN	Omar Yarumare
—	FW	VEN	Elieser Mina
—	FW	VEN	Rolando Ramírez
—	FW	COL	Jamerson Rentería
—	FW	GAB	Obambou Perrin
