= Trujillanos F.C. =

Venezuelan football club

Trujillanos FC
- Full name: Trujillanos Fútbol Club
- Nicknames: Los Guerreros de la Montaña; Los Aurimarrones; El Tru
- Founded: 25 August 1981; 45 years ago
- Ground: Estadio José Alberto Pérez; Valera, Venezuela
- Capacity: 25,000
- Chairman: Basilio Álvarez
- Manager: Pedro Vera
- League: Liga FUTVE
- 2025: Liga FUTVE 2, champions (promoted)
| Home colours | Away colours |

Trujillanos Fútbol Club is a Venezuelan football team playing at the top level, the Primera División Venezolana. It is based in Valera. Their home stadium is Estadio Luis Loreto Lira.

At the end of the 2006–2007 season Trujillanos finished in the relegation places but the club won a reprieve when the Primera División Venezolana decided to expand from 10 to 18 teams, thus allowing the two teams in the relegation places to remain in the league.

== Honours ==
- Primera División Venezolana: 1

Apertura 2014

- Segunda División Venezolana: 2

1988–89, 2025

- Copa de Venezuela: 2

1992, 2010

== Performance in CONMEBOL competitions ==
- Copa Libertadores: 3 appearances

1995: First Round
2002: Preliminary Round
2016: Group Stage

- Copa Sudamericana: 5 appearances

2005: Second Preliminary Round
2010: First Round
2011: Second Round
2013: First Round
2014: First Round

== Current first team squad ==
Note: Flags indicate national team as defined under FIFA eligibility rules; some limited exceptions apply. Players may hold more than one non-FIFA nationality.

| No. | Pos. | Nation | Player |
|---|---|---|---|
| 1 | GK | VEN | José Febres |
| 2 | DF | VEN | Óscar Rojas |
| 3 | DF | VEN | Miguel Umbría |
| 4 | DF | COL | Fabian Chaverra |
| 5 | DF | VEN | Javier Maldonado |
| 6 | DF | VEN | Néstor Trejo |
| 7 | FW | VEN | Enderson Torrealba |
| 9 | FW | PAR | Francisco Bareiro |
| 10 | MF | VEN | Enderson Abreu |
| 11 | MF | VEN | Leomar Mosquera |
| 12 | GK | VEN | Osnel García |
| 13 | DF | VEN | Greyberth Trompetera |
| 14 | MF | ARG | Nicolás Femia |
| 15 | MF | VEN | Juan Carlos Ortíz |
| 16 | MF | VEN | Riky Marchesano |

| No. | Pos. | Nation | Player |
|---|---|---|---|
| 17 | FW | VEN | Albaro Polo |
| 18 | FW | VEN | José Alejandro Rivas |
| 19 | MF | VEN | Ridenson Morillo |
| 20 | MF | VEN | Jorge Páez |
| 21 | DF | VEN | Kevin De la Hoz |
| 22 | MF | VEN | Kevin González |
| 23 | MF | VEN | Marlon Fernández |
| 24 | GK | VEN | Luis Terán |
| 25 | DF | VEN | Steven Pabón |
| 26 | DF | COL | Juan Deusa |
| 28 | MF | VEN | Argel Sánchez |
| 33 | DF | VEN | Mayker González |
| 36 | MF | VEN | Joantony Carmona |
| 99 | FW | COL | David Livingston |
