= Zamora F.C. =

Association football club in Venezuela

Zamora
- Full name: Zamora Fútbol Club
- Nicknames: El Blanquinegro; La Furia Llanera; El Llanero
- Founded: August 21, 2002; 24 years ago
- Ground: Estadio Agustín Tovar; Barinas, Venezuela
- Capacity: 29,800
- Chairman: Omar Nemer
- Manager: Noel Sanvicente
- League: Liga FUTVE
- 2025: Liga FUTVE, 10th of 14
Home colours	Away colours

Zamora Fútbol Club is a Venezuelan football club in Barinas and playing in the Venezuelan Primera División. It plays its home matches at the Estadio Agustín Tovar.

== History ==
Zamora Fútbol Club was founded in 2002. After being in the Second Division for several years the club was promoted to the First Division after finishing as runners-up in the Second Division in the 2005–06 season. Zamora FC have been champions 4 times (2013, 2014, 2016, 2018).

== Honours ==
=== National ===
- Primera División
  - Winners (5): 2012–13, 2013–14, 2015, 2016, 2018
- Copa Venezuela
  - Winners (1): 2019

== Performance in CONMEBOL competitions ==
- Copa Libertadores: 4 appearances

2012: Group Stage
2014: Group Stage
2015: Group Stage
2017: Group Stage

- Copa Sudamericana: 4 appearances

2007: Preliminary Round
2009: First Round
2015: First Round
2016: Second Round

== Stadium ==
The club plays their home matches at Estadio Agustín Tovar, which has a maximum capacity of 30,000 people.

== Players ==
As of 22 March, 2026. Note: Flags indicate national team as defined under FIFA eligibility rules; some limited exceptions apply. Players may hold more than one non-FIFA nationality.

No.	Pos.	Nation	Player
1	GK	VEN	Luis Corredor
3	DF	COL	Stiven Valencia
4	DF	VEN	Brayan Rodríguez
5	MF	ARG	Eric Barrios
6	DF	VEN	Gabriel Benítez
7	FW	VEN	Erickson Gallardo
8	MF	VEN	Arles Flores (Captain)
9	FW	COL	Mario Álvarez
10	FW	VEN	Richard Celis
11	FW	VEN	José Sequera
12	GK	VEN	Jorge Graterol
13	DF	COL	Anthony Matos
14	MF	VEN	Sergio Sulbarán
17	FW	PAR	Ronald Acuña
20	FW	VEN	Raudy Guerrero
21	MF	VEN	Raul Spallone

No.	Pos.	Nation	Player
22	DF	VEN	Jean Madera
23	MF	VEN	Junior Cedeño
24	GK	VEN	Moisés Gallo
25	DF	COL	Juan Mosquera
27	MF	COL	Cristian Díaz
29	FW	VEN	José Barragán
33	FW	VEN	José Flores
40	DF	VEN	Isai Valladares
70	FW	COL	Freddy Espinal
—	MF	VEN	Helzon Pomozy
—	DF	VEN	Armando Rivas
—	MF	VEN	Carlos Rueda
—	DF	VEN	Hermes Rodríguez
—	GK	VEN	Italo Sulbarán
—	MF	VEN	Néstor Jiménez

== Managers ==
Period	Name
2002-2005	(Venezuela) Julio Quintero
2005-2007	(Venezuela) Darío Martínez
2007	(Venezuela) Nelson Carrero
2008	(Venezuela) Eduardo Saragó
2008-2009	(Venezuela) Darío Martínez
2009-2011	(Venezuela) José de Jesús Vera
2011-2012	(Colombia) Oscar Gil
2012-2014	(Venezuela) Noel Sanvicente
2014	(Venezuela) Juvencio Betancourt
2014-2015	(Venezuela) Julio Quintero
2015-2017	(Venezuela) Francesco Stifano
2017	(Venezuela) Luis Vera
2017-2019	(Venezuela) Alí Cañas
2019	(Venezuela) Rubén Benítez
2020	(Venezuela) José Manuel Rey
2021	(Argentina) Marcelo Gómez
2021	(Venezuela) Alfarabí Romero
2022	(Venezuela) Noel Sanvicente
2023	(Venezuela) Francesco Stifano
2023-2024	(Venezuela) Enrique Maggiolo
2024	(Venezuela) Alí Cañas
2024-2025	(Venezuela) José María Morr
2026-	(Venezuela) Noel Sanvicente
