= 2018 Copa Venezuela =

Tournament details
- Country: Venezuela
- Dates: 11 July – 31 October 2018
- Teams: 39

Final positions
- Champions: Zulia (2nd title)
- Runners-up: Aragua
- Copa Sudamericana: Zulia

The 2018 Copa Venezuela was the 49th edition of the competition. It began with the first stage on 11 July 2018 and concluded with the second leg of the final on 31 October 2018. Primera División side Mineros were the defending champions, but they were disqualified from the competition in the second stage.

Zulia were the champions after beating Aragua 3–1 on aggregate in the final, and qualified to the 2019 Copa Sudamericana.

== First stage ==
- Teams entering this round: 21 teams from the Segunda División.
- The matches took place from 11 to 18 July 2018.

=== Group 1 ===
Pos	Team	Pld	W	D	L	GF	GA	GD	Pts	Qualification
1	Angostura	2	2	0	0	7	5	+2	6	Advance to second stage
2	LALA	2	1	0	1	3	3	0	3	Advance to second stage
3	Chicó de Guayana	2	0	0	2	3	5	−2	0	

Rules for classification: 1) Points; 2) Goal difference; 3) Goals scored.

11 July 2018	Angostura	3–2	LALA	Ciudad Guayana
15:00	Cardozo 17'; Vargas 28'; Cermeño 77'		A. Rondón 36'; Acosta 68'	Stadium: Polideportivo Cachamay; Attendance: 100; Referee: José Márquez

14 July 2018	LALA	1–0	Chicó de Guayana	Ciudad Guayana
15:00	A. Ramírez 56'			Stadium: Polideportivo Cachamay; Attendance: 659; Referee: Darwin Cabeza

18 July 2018	Chicó de Guayana	3–4	Angostura	Ciudad Guayana
15:00	A. Castillo 8'; Tarache 45+2'; Alfaro 58'		J. González 3'; Fermín 16'; Cardozo 61'; Lugo 90'	Stadium: Polideportivo Cachamay; Referee: Stalin Rondón

=== Group 2 ===
Pos	Team	Pld	W	D	L	GF	GA	GD	Pts	Qualification
1	Margarita	2	2	0	0	4	1	+3	6	Advance to second stage
2	Atlético Furrial	2	0	1	1	3	4	−1	1	Advance to second stage
3	Petroleros	2	0	1	1	4	6	−2	1	

Rules for classification: 1) Points; 2) Goal difference; 3) Goals scored.

11 July 2018	Petroleros	3–3	Atlético Furrial	Puerto La Cruz
15:00	Romero 65'; L. Rondón 85', 90+1'		Regardiz 28'; K. Blanco 55'; A. Carrillo 57'	Stadium: José Antonio Anzoátegui; Attendance: 73; Referee: Anderson Tovar

14 July 2018	Atlético Furrial	0–1	Margarita	Maturín
15:00			Leonett 90'	Stadium: Alexander Bottini; Attendance: 244; Referee: Adrián Cabello

18 July 2018	Margarita	3–1	Petroleros	Pampatar
15:00	Alemán 45+2' (pen.), 67'; Mina 80'		E. Pérez 18'	Stadium: Ciudad Deportiva; Referee: José Rivas

=== Group 3 ===
Pos	Team	Pld	W	D	L	GF	GA	GD	Pts	Qualification
1	Libertador	2	1	1	0	3	0	+3	4	Advance to second stage
2	Deportivo Petare	2	1	1	0	2	1	+1	4	Advance to second stage
3	Universidad Central	2	0	0	2	1	5	−4	0	

Rules for classification: 1) Points; 2) Goal difference; 3) Goals scored.

11 July 2018	Libertador	0–0	Deportivo Petare	Caracas
15:00				Stadium: Fray Luis; Attendance: 53; Referee: Juan Cabeza

15 July 2018	Deportivo Petare	2–1	Universidad Central	Caracas
15:00	Vásquez 80'; Ojeda 90'		Annese 33'	Stadium: Fray Luis; Attendance: 287; Referee: Joan Leal

18 July 2018	Universidad Central	0–3	Libertador	Caracas
13:00			Perdomo 35', 51' (pen.), 67'	Stadium: Fray Luis; Referee: Edwin Gómez

=== Group 4 ===
Pos	Team	Pld	W	D	L	GF	GA	GD	Pts	Qualification
1	Yaracuyanos	2	2	0	0	6	1	+5	6	Advance to second stage
2	Yaracuy	2	1	0	1	6	4	+2	3	Advance to second stage
3	GV Maracay	2	0	0	2	2	9	−7	0	

Rules for classification: 1) Points; 2) Goal difference; 3) Goals scored.

11 July 2018	GV Maracay	2–5	Yaracuy	Maracay
15:00	León 86'; Salazar 90+1'		Herrera 8', 64'; Puerta 10'; Oviedo 24'; Nañez 80'	Stadium: Giusseppe Antonelli; Attendance: 103; Referee: Henry Luna

14 July 2018	Yaracuy	1–2	Yaracuyanos	San Felipe
15:00	Rivero 88'		J. Blanco 13'; R. Arteaga 58'	Stadium: Florentino Oropeza; Attendance: 450; Referee: Isley Delgado

18 July 2018	Yaracuyanos	4–0	GV Maracay	San Felipe
15:00	Montiel 14'; E. Escobar 30', 72'; Ortega 60'			Stadium: Florentino Oropeza; Referee: Luis Parra

=== Group 5 ===
Pos	Team	Pld	W	D	L	GF	GA	GD	Pts	Qualification
1	ULA	2	1	0	1	5	4	+1	3	Advance to second stage
2	Llaneros	2	1	0	1	3	2	+1	3	Advance to second stage
3	Hermanos Colmenarez	2	1	0	1	2	4	−2	3	

Rules for classification: 1) Points; 2) Goal difference; 3) Goals scored.

11 July 2018	ULA	4–1	Hermanos Colmenarez	Mérida
	Magallán 26', 81'; Rojas 45'; H. Díaz 52'		Lugo 90'	Stadium: Estadio Metropolitano; Attendance: 300; Referee: Marlon Escalante

14 July 2018	Hermanos Colmenarez	1–0	Llaneros	Barinas
	E. Jiménez 81'			Stadium: Reinaldo Melo; Attendance: 153; Referee: Emikar Calderas

18 July 2018	Llaneros	3–1	ULA	Guanare
15:00	Torres 17'; Reyes 32', 86'		Rojas 33'	Stadium: Rafael Calles Pinto; Referee: Reyes Soto

=== Group 6 ===
Pos	Team	Pld	W	D	L	GF	GA	GD	Pts	Qualification
1	Titanes	2	2	0	0	7	0	+7	6	Advance to second stage
2	Deportivo JBL	2	1	0	1	2	4	−2	3	Advance to second stage
3	Unión Atlético Falcón	2	0	0	2	0	5	−5	0	

Rules for classification: 1) Points; 2) Goal difference; 3) Goals scored.

11 July 2018	Titanes	4–0	Deportivo JBL	Maracaibo
	Rito 47', 47', 57'; Alarcón 79'			Stadium: José Pachencho Romero; Attendance: 860; Referee: Yercinia Correa

14 July 2018	Deportivo JBL	2–0	Unión Atlético Falcón	Maracaibo
	Bustamante 33'; Barreto 68'			Stadium: José Pachencho Romero; Attendance: 251; Referee: José Luis Hoyo

18 July 2018	Unión Atlético Falcón	0–3	Titanes	Punto Fijo
15:00			Alarcón 2' (?); Cortéz (?)	Stadium: Pedro Conde; Referee: Rafael Torres

=== Group 7 ===
Pos	Team	Pld	W	D	L	GF	GA	GD	Pts	Qualification
1	Real Frontera	2	2	0	0	5	2	+3	6	Advance to second stage
2	Ureña	2	1	0	1	3	4	−1	3	Advance to second stage
3	El Vigía	2	0	0	2	2	4	−2	0	

Rules for classification: 1) Points; 2) Goal difference; 3) Goals scored.

11 July 2018	El Vigía	1–2	Ureña	El Vigía
	E. Ramírez 5'		J. Ortiz 64'; M. López 87'	Stadium: Ramón Hernández; Attendance: 100; Referee: Jean Gómez

14 July 2018	Ureña	1–3	Real Frontera	San Cristóbal
	R. Contreras 57'		Mosquera 20'; Álvarez 47' (o.g.); Altuve 90'	Stadium: Polideportivo de Pueblo Nuevo; Attendance: 200; Referee: Yorman Delgado

18 July 2018	Real Frontera	2–1	El Vigía	San Antonio
15:00	Murillo 38' (pen.); Mosquera 40'		? 14'	Stadium: Pedro Chávez; Referee: Marcos Suárez

== Second stage ==
- Teams entering this round: 18 teams from the Primera División.
- The first legs were played on 8 and 9 August and the second legs were played from 14 to 16 August 2018.

Team 1	Agg.	Team 2	1st leg	2nd leg
Centro-Oriental Group
Angostura	5–1	Mineros	2–1	3–0
LALA	2–6	Monagas	1–1	1–5
Margarita	1–4	Deportivo Anzoátegui	0–1	1–3
Atlético Furrial	1–4	Deportivo La Guaira	1–3	0–1
Deportivo Petare	1–7	Caracas	1–4	0–3
Academia Puerto Cabello	0–1	Metropolitanos	0–1	0–0
Libertador	2–4	Aragua	0–3	2–1
Estudiantes de Caracas	3–7	Atlético Venezuela	1–3	2–4
Centro-Occidental Group
Deportivo JBL	3–1	Trujillanos	1–0	2–1
Yaracuy	5–2	Deportivo Lara	3–1	2–1
Titanes	1–2	Zulia	1–2	0–0
Yaracuyanos	1–3	Carabobo	1–0	0–3
ULA	2–3	Zamora	1–1	1–2
Llaneros	4–3	Portuguesa	1–2	3–1
Real Frontera	0–2	Deportivo Táchira	0–1	0–1
Ureña	2–0	Estudiantes de Mérida	2–0	Annulled

Notes

1. FVF awarded Angostura a 3–0 win as a result of Mineros substituting its mandatory youth players. The match originally ended with a 5–0 win for Mineros.
2. Match annulled due to Estudiantes de Mérida fielding ineligible players. The match originally ended with a 4–1 win for Estudiantes de Mérida.

=== First leg ===
8 August 2018	LALA	1–1	Monagas	Ciudad Guayana
15:00	Y. González 18'		R. Rojas 38'	Stadium: Polideportivo Cachamay; Attendance: 874; Referee: José Rivas

8 August 2018	Margarita	0–1	Deportivo Anzoátegui	Pampatar
15:00			Lobo 44'	Stadium: Ciudad Deportiva; Attendance: 150; Referee: Oscar Durán

8 August 2018	Deportivo Petare	1–4	Caracas	Caracas
15:00	V. Vásquez 68'		Saggiomo 30'; Arrieta 36'; Arace 59'; R. Chacón 69'	Stadium: Cocodrilos Sports Park; Attendance: 1,217; Referee: Robert Mosqueda

8 August 2018	Estudiantes de Caracas	1–3	Atlético Venezuela	Maracay
15:30	Paccioco 90'		K. Barreto 36'; Farías 42', 88'	Stadium: Giuseppe Antonelli; Attendance: 120; Referee: Edwing Gómez

8 August 2018	Libertador	0–3	Aragua	Caracas
15:30			Gamboa 16', 32'; Bedoya 90+2'	Stadium: Universidad Santa María; Attendance: 200; Referee: Jonathan Sánchez

8 August 2018	Yaracuyanos	1–0	Carabobo	San Felipe
15:30	Escobar 83'			Stadium: Florentino Oropeza; Attendance: 1,308; Referee: Pedro Jiménez

8 August 2018	Llaneros	1–2	Portuguesa	Guanare
15:30	D. Rodríguez 33'		Bonilla 21'; Sarmiento 54'	Stadium: Rafael Calles Pinto; Attendance: 1,200; Referee: Wilfredo Martínez

8 August 2018	Angostura	2–1	Mineros	Ciudad Bolívar
16:00	Cabello 58'; Vargas 71'		Rondón 31'	Stadium: Ricardo Tulio Maya; Attendance: 500; Referee: Giancarlo Perluzzo

8 August 2018	Titanes	1–2	Zulia	Maracaibo
16:00	Ballezo 79'		Perozo 14' (pen.); Prono 90+1'	Stadium: José Pachencho Romero; Attendance: 4,115; Referee: Yeferzon Miranda

8 August 2018	Real Frontera	0–1	Deportivo Táchira	San Antonio
16:30			Maldonado 90+3'	Stadium: Pedro Chávez; Referee: Gustavo Maldonado

8 August 2018	Ureña	2–0	Estudiantes de Mérida	San Cristóbal
17:00	J. Ortiz 7'; Caicedo 44'			Stadium: Polideportivo de Pueblo Nuevo; Attendance: 100; Referee: Marco Suárez

8 August 2018	ULA	1–1	Zamora	Mérida
17:00	H. Díaz 21'		Uribe 84'	Stadium: Estadio Metropolitano; Attendance: 500; Referee: Yorman Delgado

8 August 2018	Academia Puerto Cabello	0–1	Metropolitanos	Puerto Cabello
19:00			J. Rojas 45'	Stadium: La Bombonerita; Attendance: 5,165; Referee: Emikar Calderas

9 August 2018	Atlético Furrial	1–3	Deportivo La Guaira	Maturín
15:00	J. Gómez 7'		Bareiro 4'; D. González 48'; J. Pérez 89'	Stadium: Alexander Bottini; Attendance: 235; Referee: Stalin Rondón

9 August 2018	Yaracuy	3–1	Deportivo Lara	San Felipe
15:30	Ordoñez 14'; F. Rivero 59'; D. Herrera 90'		Mendoza 45'	Stadium: Florentino Oropeza; Attendance: 350; Referee: Reyes Soto

9 August 2018	Deportivo JBL	1–0	Trujillanos	Maracaibo
15:30	D. Barreto 40'			Stadium: José Pachencho Romero; Attendance: 315; Referee: Isley Delgado

=== Second leg ===
14 August 2018	Carabobo	3–0 (3–1 agg.)	Yaracuyanos	Cabudare
16:00			Lujano 37', 47'; C. Rivero 54'	Stadium: Estadio Metropolitano; Attendance: 138; Referee: Ramón Ortega

15 August 2018	Metropolitanos	0–0 (1–0 agg.)	Academia Puerto Cabello	Caracas
15:30				Stadium: Universidad Santa María; Attendance: 598; Referee: Ronny Cuevas

15 August 2018	Atlético Venezuela	4–2 (7–3 agg.)	Estudiantes de Caracas	Maracay
15:30	Meza 17'; K. Barreto 48'; Farías 73'; Sosa 90+4'		Ríos 14'; Fuentes 52'	Stadium: Giuseppe Antonelli; Attendance: 442; Referee: Joan Leal

15 August 2018	Caracas	3–0 (7–1 agg.)	Deportivo Petare	Caracas
16:00	Llovera 5'; Moreira 36'; Arace 40'			Stadium: Cocodrilos Sports Park; Attendance: 1,180; Referee: Jonathan Sánchez

15 August 2018	Aragua	1–2 (4–2 agg.)	Libertador	Maracay
16:00	Bonilla 35'		A. Contreras 45+2'; Perdoma 54'	Stadium: Hermanos Ghersi Páez; Attendance: 430; Referee: Isley Delgado

15 August 2018	Trujillanos	1–2 (1–3 agg.)	Deportivo JBL	Valera
16:00	Zúñiga 60'		G. García 62'; Reintería 72'	Stadium: José Alberto Pérez; Attendance: 300; Referee: Yercinia Correa

15 August 2018	Deportivo Lara	1–2 (2–5 agg.)	Yaracuy	Cabudare
16:00	Romero 56'		F. Rivero 67'; Herrera 78'	Stadium: Estadio Metropolitano; Attendance: 1,518; Referee: Pedro Jiménez

15 August 2018	Zulia	0–0 (2–1 agg.)	Titanes	Maracaibo
16:00				Stadium: José Pachencho Romero; Attendance: 1,061; Referee: José Argote

15 August 2018	Portuguesa	1–3 (3–4 agg.)	Llaneros	Acarigua
16:00	O. García 75'		D. Rodríguez 41' (pen.), 69' (pen.); Perea 74'	Stadium: José Antonio Páez; Attendance: 150; Referee: Luis Parra

15 August 2018	Deportivo Anzoátegui	3–1 (4–1 agg.)	Margarita	Puerto La Cruz
17:00	Figueroa 68', 84'; Valecillo 82' (pen.)		Escobar 33'	Stadium: José Antonio Anzoátegui; Referee: Anderson Tovar

15 August 2018	Deportivo Táchira	1–0 (2–0 agg.)	Real Frontera	San Cristóbal
17:00	Villamizar 69'			Stadium: Polideportivo de Pueblo Nuevo; Attendance: 1,973; Referee: Yorman Delgado

15 August 2018	Monagas	5–1 (6–2 agg.)	LALA	Maturín
18:00	Cordero 28'; N. Pérez 42'; R. Rojas 74', 80'; Benítez 88'		Mejía 21'	Stadium: Estadio Monumental; Attendance: 2,608; Referee: Francisco López

15 August 2018	Zamora	2–1 (3–2 agg.)	ULA	Barinas
18:00	I. González 63'; Gallardo 77'		Castrillo 43' (pen.)	Stadium: Agustín Tovar; Attendance: 2,059; Referee: Edwing Gómez

15 August 2018	Estudiantes de Mérida	Annulled (0–2 agg.)	Ureña	Mérida
18:00	Espinoza 19'; Álvarez 27', 62'; Castillo 81'		Caicedo 53'	Stadium: Estadio Metropolitano; Attendance: 2,442; Referee: Leonardo Caripa

16 August 2018	Mineros	0–3; Awarded (1–5 agg.)	Angostura	Ciudad Guayana
9:00	Granados 9'; Peña 11'; Cuero 22'; Blanco 33'; N. Hernández 90'			Stadium: Polideportivo Cachamay; Attendance: 817; Referee: Adrián Cabello

16 August 2018	Deportivo La Guaira	1–0 (4–1 agg.)	Atlético Furrial	Puerto La Cruz
15:00	Lugo 22'			Stadium: José Antonio Anzoátegui; Attendance: 345; Referee: Roger Arredondo

== Final stages ==
=== Round of 16 ===
- The first legs were played on 29 August and the second legs were played on 5 September 2018.

Team 1	Agg.	Team 2	1st leg	2nd leg
Centro-Oriental Group
Angostura	0–2	Deportivo Anzoátegui	0–2	0–0
Monagas	2–4	Deportivo La Guaira	1–2	1–2
Caracas	0–3	Aragua	0–2	0–1
Metropolitanos	1–1 (a)	Atlético Venezuela	1–1	0–0
Centro-Occidental Group
Deportivo JBL	0–3	Zulia	0–1	0–2
Yaracuy	2–2 (a)	Carabobo	2–2	0–0
Zamora	3–2	Deportivo Táchira	2–1	1–1
Llaneros	3–3 (5–3 p)	Ureña	2–1	1–2

==== First leg ====
29 August 2018	Deportivo JBL	0–1	Zulia	Maracaibo
15:00			Zambrano 37'	Stadium: José Pachencho Romero; Attendance: 1,306; Referee: María Herrán

29 August 2018	Yaracuy	2–2	Carabobo	San Felipe
15:30	F. Rivero 80', 84'		Villegas 49'; Ocanto 52'	Stadium: Florentino Oropeza; Attendance: 850; Referee: Yercinia Correa

29 August 2018	Llaneros	2–1	Ureña	Guanare
15:30	Palacio 45+5'; D. Rivero 59'		G. Salazar 88'	Stadium: Rafael Calles Pinto; Attendance: 808; Referee: Jonathan Sánchez

29 August 2018	Metropolitanos	1–1	Atlético Venezuela	Caracas
15:30	Arciniegas 33'		J. Salazar 70'	Stadium: Universidad Santa María; Attendance: 421; Referee: Reyes Soto

29 August 2018	Angostura	0–2	Deportivo Anzoátegui	Ciudad Guayana
16:00			Lobo 34', 61'	Stadium: Ricardo Tulio Maya; Attendance: 300; Referee: Yender Herrera

29 August 2018	Caracas	0–2	Aragua	Caracas
16:00			Navas 32'; Salazar 42'	Stadium: Cocodrilos Sports Park; Attendance: 1,071; Referee: Marlon Escalante

29 August 2018	Monagas	1–2	Deportivo La Guaira	Maturín
18:00	R. Rojas 52'		C. González 9'; Lugo 43'	Stadium: Estadio Monumental; Attendance: 2,154; Referee: Edwing Gómez

29 August 2018	Zamora	2–1	Deportivo Táchira	Barinas
19:00	Uribe 26'; Gallardo 54'		Maldonado 7'	Stadium: Agustín Tovar; Attendance: 4,397; Referee: José Argote

==== Second leg ====
5 September 2018	Deportivo La Guaira	2–1 (4–2 agg.)	Monagas	Caracas
10:30	D. González 66'; Ar. Flores 86' (pen.)		J. González 84' (pen.)	Stadium: Universidad Santa María; Referee: José Luis Hoyo

5 September 2018	Atlético Venezuela (a)	0–0 (1–1 agg.)	Metropolitanos	Maracay
15:30				Stadium: Giuseppe Antonelli; Referee: Robert Mosqueda

5 September 2018	Carabobo (a)	0–0 (2–2 agg.)	Yaracuy	Cabudare
16:00				Stadium: Estadio Metropolitano; Referee: José Argote

5 September 2018	Zulia	2–0 (3–0 agg.)	Deportivo JBL	Maracaibo
16:30	Perozo 31' (pen.); C. Gómez 52'			Stadium: José Pachencho Romero; Referee: Orlando Bracamonte

5 September 2018	Deportivo Anzoátegui	0–0 (2–0 agg.)	Angostura	Puerto La Cruz
17:00				Stadium: José Antonio Anzoátegui; Referee: Francisco López

5 September 2018	Aragua	1–0 (3–0 agg.)	Caracas	Maracay
17:00	Guerra 72'			Stadium: Hermanos Ghersi Páez; Referee: Edwing Gómez

5 September 2018	Deportivo Táchira	1–1 (2–3 agg.)	Zamora	San Cristóbal
17:00	Aquino 90+7' (pen.)		Gallardo 45+2'	Stadium: Polideportivo de Pueblo Nuevo; Referee: Ángel Arteaga

5 September 2018	Ureña	2–1 (3–3 agg.) (3–5 p)	Llaneros	Ureña
17:00				Stadium: Estadio Bicentenario
	Penalties

=== Quarter-finals ===
- The first legs were played on 9 September and the second legs were played on 3 October 2018.

Team 1	Agg.	Team 2	1st leg	2nd leg
Centro-Oriental Group
Deportivo Anzoátegui	2–2 (3–2 p)	Deportivo La Guaira	1–1	1–1
Aragua	4–1	Atlético Venezuela	2–0	2–1
Centro-Occidental Group
Zulia	3–3 (a)	Carabobo	1–1	2–2
Zamora	3–1	Llaneros	1–0	2–1

==== First leg ====
9 September 2018	Zulia	1–1	Carabobo	Maracaibo
16:30	Perozo 56' (pen.)	Report	Rivero 90'	Stadium: José Pachencho Romero; Attendance: 2,431; Referee: Yorman Delgado

9 September 2018	Deportivo Anzoátegui	1–1	Deportivo La Guaira	Puerto La Cruz
17:00	Yendis 62'	Report	García 44'	Stadium: José Antonio Anzoátegui; Attendance: 1,088; Referee: Anderson Tovar

9 September 2018	Aragua	2–0	Atlético Venezuela	Maracay
17:00	Gamboa 49'; Guerra 59' (pen.)	Report		Stadium: Hermanos Ghersi Páez; Attendance: 2,010; Referee: Ronny Cueva

9 September 2018	Zamora	1–0	Llaneros	Barinas
18:00	Uribe 45+1'	Report		Stadium: Agustín Tovar; Attendance: 3,557; Referee: Emikar Caldera

==== Second leg ====
3 October 2018	Deportivo La Guaira	1–1 (2–2 agg.) (2–3 p)	Deportivo Anzoátegui	Caracas
10:30	Vásquez 30' (o.g.)	Report	Zacarías 21'	Stadium: Estadio Olímpico; Attendance: 2,483; Referee: José Argote
	Penalties
	Ar. Flores (penalty scored); D. González (penalty scored); C. González (penalty missed); H. García (penalty missed); La Mantía (penalty missed)		(penalty scored) A. Hernández; (penalty scored) J. Moreno; (penalty scored) Figueroa; (penalty missed) Griguol

3 October 2018	Atlético Venezuela	1–2 (1–4 agg.)	Aragua	Maracay
15:30	Sosa 5'	Report	Bonilla 38'; Guerra 43' (pen.)	Stadium: Giuseppe Antonelli; Attendance: 398; Referee: Jesús Valenzuela

3 October 2018	Llaneros	1–2 (1–3 agg.)	Zamora	Guanare
15:30	Fuentes 66'	Report	F. Blanco 5'; Gallardo 18'	Stadium: Rafael Calles Pinto; Attendance: 1,170; Referee: Eduardo Mármol

3 October 2018	Carabobo	2–2 (3–3 agg.)	Zulia (a)	Valencia
19:00	Ocanto 25'; Colina 68'	Report	Rodríguez 35'; Cure 90+4'	Stadium: Misael Delgado; Attendance: 1,028; Referee: Yender Herrera

=== Semi-finals ===
- The first legs were played on 10 October and the second legs were played on 14 October 2018.

Team 1	Agg.	Team 2	1st leg	2nd leg
Deportivo Anzoátegui	2–3	Aragua	0–0	2–3
Zulia	2–0	Zamora	2–0	0–0

==== First leg ====
10 October 2018	Zulia	2–0	Zamora	Maracaibo
15:00	Soto 43' (o.g.); Prono 89'	Report		Stadium: José Pachencho Romero; Attendance: 2,196; Referee: Anderson Tovar

10 October 2018	Deportivo Anzoátegui	0–0	Aragua	Puerto La Cruz
16:00		Report		Stadium: José Antonio Anzoátegui; Attendance: 322; Referee: Emikar Caldera

==== Second leg ====
14 October 2018	Aragua	3–2 (3–2 agg.)	Deportivo Anzoátegui	Maracay
16:00	Bravo 19'; Bonilla 51'; Navas 88'		Otero 44' (pen.); Valdés 90+5'	Stadium: Hermanos Ghersi Páez; Attendance: 5,749; Referee: Juan Soto

14 October 2018	Zamora	0–0 (0–2 agg.)	Zulia	Barinas
18:00				Stadium: Agustín Tovar; Attendance: 5,761; Referee: Jesús Valenzuela

=== Final ===
24 October 2018
17:00

Aragua	1–2	Zulia
Bravo 41'	Report	Rodríguez 78'; Palmezano 85'

Estadio Olímpico Hermanos Ghersi Páez, Maracay
Attendance: 8,640
Referee: Juan Soto

31 October 2018
16:00

Zulia	1–0	Aragua
Celis 21'	Report

Estadio José Pachencho Romero, Maracaibo
Referee: Ángel Arteaga

Zulia won 3–1 on aggregate.
