= 2022 Liga FUTVE =

Venezuelan Primera División season

Liga FUTVE
- Season: 2022
- Dates: 24 February – 30 October 2022
- Champions: Metropolitanos (1st title)
- Relegated: Aragua
- Copa Libertadores: Metropolitanos; Monagas; Carabobo; Zamora
- Copa Sudamericana: Estudiantes de Mérida; Deportivo Táchira; Caracas; Academia Puerto Cabello
- Matches: 277
- Goals: 656 (2.37 per match)
- Top goalscorer: Kevin Viveros (21 goals)
- Biggest home win: Metropolitanos 5–0 Mineros (17 April)
- Biggest away win: La Guaira 1–5 Monagas (15 May)
- Highest scoring: Hnos. Colmenarez 2–5 Est. Mérida (21 October)

The 2022 Primera División season, officially Liga de Fútbol Profesional Venezolano or Liga FUTVE, was the 66th season of the Venezuelan Primera División, the top-flight football league in Venezuela, and the 41st season since the start of the professional era. The season began on 24 February and ended with the final match on 30 October 2022.

Metropolitanos won their first title in the competition, beating Monagas on penalty kicks after drawing 1–1 after extra time in the final. Deportivo Táchira were the defending champions.

== Format changes ==
On 6 October 2021, the Liga FUTVE initially announced the return of the Apertura and Clausura format for the 2022 season, with the top eight clubs advancing to a play-off stage in which international berths would be decided. It was also announced that clubs would be required to fully meet club licensing requirements in order to be allowed to take part in the competition.

The competition format was eventually confirmed by the Liga FUTVE on 12 January 2022 after a meeting with representatives from the 16 participating clubs. Instead of the Apertura and Clausura tournaments originally announced, the 16 clubs took part in a round-robin first stage in which they played each other twice (once at home and once away) for a total of 30 games, with the top 12 clubs advancing to the next round of the competition. The top four clubs, which qualified for the 2023 Copa Libertadores, advanced to a final stage (Fase Final Libertadores) where they played each other twice with the top two teams playing a single-legged final to decide the league champions. The teams placed 5th to 12th advanced to the Fase Final Sudamericana where they were divided into two groups of four, in which the top two of each group qualified for the 2023 Copa Sudamericana. The last-placed team in the first stage was relegated to Segunda División.

== Teams ==
On 30 December 2021, the Venezuelan Football Federation announced the results of the club licensing process for the 2022 season. Atlético Venezuela and Gran Valencia had their license applications denied, as well as the 2021 Segunda División champions Titanes, and were unable to take part in the competition. As a result, no teams were promoted and the 2022 Primera División season was played by 16 teams.

Relegated to 2022 Segunda División
7	Trujillanos (Occidental Group)
7	Yaracuyanos (Central Group)
7	LALA (Oriental Group)

Failed club licensing process
Atlético Venezuela
Gran Valencia

Promoted to 2022 Primera División
None (Titanes were denied a license)

=== Stadia and locations ===
Locations of the 2022 Primera División teams

Team	Manager	City	Stadium	Capacity
Academia Puerto Cabello	(Venezuela) Juan Tolisano	Puerto Cabello	La Bombonerita	7,500
Aragua	(Venezuela) Leonel Vielma	Maracay	Olímpico Hermanos Ghersi Páez	14,000
Carabobo	(Venezuela) Enrique Maggiolo	Valencia	Misael Delgado	10,400
Caracas	(Venezuela) Henry Meléndez (caretaker)	Caracas	Olímpico de la UCV	23,940
Deportivo La Guaira	(Venezuela) Daniel Farías	Caracas	Olímpico de la UCV	23,940
Deportivo Lara	(Venezuela) Jesús Ortiz	Barquisimeto	Farid Richa	12,480
Deportivo Táchira	(Venezuela) Eduardo Saragó	San Cristóbal	Polideportivo de Pueblo Nuevo	38,755
Estudiantes de Mérida	(Venezuela) Leonardo González	Mérida	Metropolitano de Mérida	42,200
Hermanos Colmenarez	(Argentina) Horacio Matuszyczk	Barinas	Agustín Tovar	29,800
Metropolitanos	(Venezuela) José María Morr	Caracas	Olímpico de la UCV	23,940
Mineros de Guayana	(Venezuela) Elías Emmons (caretaker)	Ciudad Guayana	Polideportivo Cachamay	41,600
Monagas	(Venezuela) Jhonny Ferreira	Maturín	Monumental de Maturín	51,796
Portuguesa	(Argentina) Martín Brignani	Acarigua	General José Antonio Páez	18,000
Universidad Central	(Venezuela) Edson Rodríguez	Caracas	Olímpico de la UCV	23,940
Zamora	(Venezuela) Noel Sanvicente	Barinas	Agustín Tovar	29,800
Zulia	(Venezuela) Adolfo Monsalve	Maracaibo	Sede Deportiva Lino Alonso	500

==== Managerial changes ====
Team	Outgoing manager	Manner of departure	Date of vacancy	Position in table	Incoming manager	Date of appointment
First stage
Zamora	(Venezuela) Alfarabi Romero	End of caretaker spell	21 October 2021	Pre-season	(Venezuela) Noel Sanvicente	29 December 2021
Academia Puerto Cabello	(Venezuela) Jeremy Nowak	End of caretaker spell	30 November 2021	Pre-season	(Venezuela) Francisco Perlo	17 December 2021
Deportivo Lara	(Venezuela) Leonardo González	Resigned	9 December 2021	Pre-season	(Venezuela) Jorge Durán	29 December 2021
Mineros	(Venezuela) Pastor Márquez	Mutual agreement	11 December 2021	Pre-season	(Argentina) Gabriel Martínez Poch	5 January 2022
Carabobo	(Venezuela) Enrique Maggiolo	End of contract	15 December 2021	Pre-season	(Venezuela) Enrique García	2 January 2022
Caracas	(Venezuela) Noel Sanvicente	End of contract	15 December 2021	Pre-season	(Venezuela) Francesco Stifano	27 December 2021
Deportivo Táchira	(Venezuela) Juan Tolisano	Signed by Deportes Antofagasta	21 December 2021	Pre-season	(Spain) Alex Pallarés	24 December 2021
Estudiantes de Mérida	(Venezuela) Leonel Vielma	Mutual agreement	9 March 2022	15th	(Venezuela) Ildemaro Fernández (Note: Caretaker manager.)	9 March 2022
Estudiantes de Mérida	(Venezuela) Ildemaro Fernández	End of caretaker spell	21 March 2022	12th	(Venezuela) Leonardo González	21 March 2022
Deportivo Lara	(Venezuela) Jorge Durán	Mutual agreement	27 March 2022	12th	(Venezuela) Eder Mancilla	28 March 2022
Mineros de Guayana	(Argentina) Gabriel Martínez Poch	Resigned	7 April 2022	12th	(Venezuela) Kelvin Salazar	7 April 2022
Academia Puerto Cabello	(Venezuela) Francisco Perlo	Mutual agreement	13 April 2022	15th	(Venezuela) Bladimir Morales	14 April 2022
Zulia	(Venezuela) Henry Meléndez	Sacked	15 April 2022	16th	(Venezuela) Francisco Perlo	19 April 2022
Mineros de Guayana	(Venezuela) Kelvin Salazar	End of caretaker spell	21 April 2022	13th	(Venezuela) Jorge Durán	21 April 2022
Universidad Central	(Venezuela) Daniel Sasso	Mutual agreement	4 May 2022	15th	(Venezuela) Enrique Maggiolo	6 May 2022
Academia Puerto Cabello	(Venezuela) Bladimir Morales	End of caretaker spell	13 May 2022	13th	(Venezuela) Juan Tolisano	13 May 2022
Aragua	(Venezuela) Edson Rodríguez	Mutual agreement	17 May 2022	9th	(Venezuela) Leonel Vielma	18 May 2022
Carabobo	(Venezuela) Enrique García	Sacked	4 July 2022	6th	(Venezuela) Antonio Franco	4 July 2022
Deportivo Lara	(Venezuela) Eder Mancilla	Resigned	14 July 2022	16th	(Venezuela) Eduardo Saragó	19 July 2022
Hermanos Colmenarez	(Venezuela) Luis Alberto Pacheco	Sacked	25 July 2022	12th	(Argentina) Horacio Matuszyczk	26 July 2022
Deportivo Lara	(Venezuela) Eduardo Saragó	Resigned	27 July 2022	15th	(Venezuela) Jesús Ortiz (Note: Originally as caretaker manager, appointed on a permanent basis on 9 August 2022.)	28 July 2022
Portuguesa	(Venezuela) Alí Cañas	Mutual agreement	2 August 2022	10th	(Argentina) Martín Brignani	10 August 2022
Zulia	(Venezuela) Francisco Perlo	Resigned	12 August 2022	11th	(Venezuela) Adolfo Monsalve	13 August 2022
Universidad Central	(Venezuela) Enrique Maggiolo	Resigned	16 August 2022	16th	(Venezuela) Edson Rodríguez	16 August 2022
Deportivo Táchira	(Spain) Alex Pallarés	Mutual agreement	19 August 2022	5th	(Venezuela) Eduardo Saragó	20 August 2022
Mineros de Guayana	(Venezuela) Jorge Durán	Mutual agreement	28 August 2022	14th	(Venezuela) Elías Emmons	31 August 2022
Caracas	(Venezuela) Francesco Stifano	Sacked	19 September 2022	11th	(Venezuela) Henry Meléndez	19 September 2022
Final stages
Carabobo	(Venezuela) Antonio Franco	Sacked	7 October 2022	4th, Fase Final Libertadores	(Venezuela) Enrique Maggiolo	7 October 2022

== First stage ==
The first stage started on 24 February 2022 and ended on 18 September 2022.

=== Standings ===
Pos	Team	Pld	W	D	L	GF	GA	GD	Pts	Qualification or relegation
1	Zamora	30	14	13	3	44	24	+20	55	Advance to Fase Final Libertadores
2	Metropolitanos	30	15	8	7	44	29	+15	53	Advance to Fase Final Libertadores
3	Monagas	30	13	9	8	46	33	+13	48	Advance to Fase Final Libertadores
4	Carabobo	30	11	13	6	36	22	+14	46	Advance to Fase Final Libertadores
5	Deportivo La Guaira	30	12	10	8	46	42	+4	46	Advance to Fase Final Sudamericana
6	Deportivo Táchira	30	11	11	8	38	33	+5	44	Advance to Fase Final Sudamericana
7	Academia Puerto Cabello	30	11	8	11	38	41	−3	41	Advance to Fase Final Sudamericana
8	Hermanos Colmenarez	30	11	7	12	39	38	+1	40	Advance to Fase Final Sudamericana
9	Estudiantes de Mérida	30	9	12	9	38	37	+1	39	Advance to Fase Final Sudamericana
10	Portuguesa	30	7	16	7	26	27	−1	37	Advance to Fase Final Sudamericana
11	Caracas	30	8	12	10	34	36	−2	36	Advance to Fase Final Sudamericana
12	Deportivo Lara	30	9	9	12	32	36	−4	36	Advance to Fase Final Sudamericana
13	Mineros de Guayana	30	8	10	12	43	54	−11	34	
14	Zulia	30	8	8	14	29	43	−14	32	
15	Universidad Central	30	6	9	15	19	40	−21	27	
16	Aragua (R)	30	5	9	16	32	49	−17	24	Relegation to Segunda División

Source: Liga FUTVE, Soccerway
Rules for classification: 1) Points; 2) Goal difference; 3) Goals scored; 4) Head-to-head results; 5) Drawing of lots.
(R) Relegated

=== Results ===
Home \ Away	APC	ARA	CBO	CAR	DLG	LAR	TAC	ESM	HCO	MET	MIN	MON	POR	UCV	ZAM	ZUL
Academia Puerto Cabello	—	2–1	1–1	0–0	1–1	3–2	1–2	1–0	1–2	0–2	4–2	0–2	1–1	3–0	0–0	2–2
Aragua	0–1	—	1–1	4–2	0–2	1–1	1–0	0–1	1–0	2–3	3–3	2–4	0–1	1–0	0–1	0–0
Carabobo	0–1	5–1	—	0–0	2–0	2–2	3–1	0–0	1–0	2–0	3–1	1–2	0–0	4–0	1–1	1–0
Caracas	3–1	1–0	0–0	—	3–2	1–2	2–0	3–1	1–2	1–1	1–0	2–2	1–1	1–2	1–1	3–1
Deportivo La Guaira	2–1	3–3	3–2	2–0	—	2–3	0–0	1–1	2–0	1–0	1–1	1–5	2–1	0–1	1–1	2–1
Deportivo Lara	1–2	2–2	1–0	1–1	2–0	—	2–0	2–2	0–1	1–2	2–3	0–0	1–0	0–0	0–2	3–0
Deportivo Táchira	1–1	2–0	0–0	0–0	3–3	2–0	—	2–2	0–1	3–0	1–0	4–2	2–2	0–0	1–1	3–0
Estudiantes de Mérida	1–3	2–1	0–0	0–0	2–1	1–0	1–2	—	2–2	3–1	2–0	1–1	1–1	3–0	1–2	2–0
Hermanos Colmenarez	4–1	4–1	2–3	2–1	0–2	3–1	1–2	1–1	—	1–2	1–1	2–0	0–0	2–0	1–1	0–2
Metropolitanos	0–2	1–1	0–0	3–0	1–2	3–1	1–1	2–0	2–1	—	5–0	0–0	0–0	2–0	2–0	2–0
Mineros de Guayana	2–0	0–3	2–3	1–2	3–3	1–0	1–2	1–1	3–1	2–2	—	1–3	2–2	3–1	2–2	0–3
Monagas	0–1	3–1	0–0	0–0	2–2	0–1	3–0	2–2	3–1	2–1	1–2	—	2–4	1–0	0–1	2–0
Portuguesa	2–1	1–0	0–1	2–1	1–0	0–0	0–0	2–1	1–1	0–0	0–2	1–2	—	0–0	2–3	1–1
Universidad Central	2–2	2–1	0–0	1–0	0–0	0–0	2–1	1–2	0–1	2–3	0–2	0–2	2–0	—	1–1	0–1
Zamora	1–0	1–1	1–0	3–3	2–3	2–0	2–0	2–0	1–1	0–1	1–1	2–0	0–0	2–0	—	5–1
Zulia	4–1	0–0	2–0	1–0	0–2	0–1	1–3	3–2	2–1	1–2	1–1	0–0	0–0	2–2	0–2	—

Source: Soccerway
Legend: Blue = home team win; Yellow = draw; Red = away team win.

== Fase Final Libertadores ==
The top four teams in the first stage contested Fase Final Libertadores, playing each other twice. The top two teams advanced to the final and also qualified for the group stage of the 2023 Copa Libertadores, whilst the third- and fourth-placed teams qualified for the preliminary stages of the same competition.

=== Standings ===
Pos	Team	Pld	W	D	L	GF	GA	GD	Pts	Qualification
1	Metropolitanos	6	2	3	1	3	2	+1	9	Advance to Final and qualification for Copa Libertadores group stage
2	Monagas	6	2	2	2	8	8	0	8	Advance to Final and qualification for Copa Libertadores group stage
3	Carabobo	6	2	1	3	8	8	0	7	Qualification for Copa Libertadores second stage
4	Zamora	6	1	4	1	5	6	−1	7	Qualification for Copa Libertadores first stage

Source: Soccerway
Rules for classification: 1) Points; 2) Goal difference; 3) Goals scored; 4) Head-to-head results; 5) Drawing of lots.

=== Results ===
Home \ Away	CBO	MET	MON	ZAM
Carabobo	—	0–0	3–2	0–2
Metropolitanos	1–0	—	0–2	0–0
Monagas	2–1	0–2	—	1–1
Zamora	1–4	0–0	1–1	—

Source: Soccerway
Legend: Blue = home team win; Yellow = draw; Red = away team win.

== Fase Final Sudamericana ==
Fase Final Sudamericana was contested by the teams ranked 5th to 12th in the first stage, which were drawn into two groups with the teams placed fifth and sixth in the previous stage being seeded into each group and played each other team in their group twice. The top two teams of each group qualified for the 2023 Copa Sudamericana.

=== Group A ===
==== Standings ====
Pos	Team	Pld	W	D	L	GF	GA	GD	Pts	Qualification
1	Estudiantes de Mérida	6	3	2	1	12	8	+4	11	Qualification for Copa Sudamericana first stage
2	Caracas	6	3	2	1	7	4	+3	11	Qualification for Copa Sudamericana first stage
3	Hermanos Colmenarez	6	1	2	3	8	9	−1	5	
4	Deportivo La Guaira	6	1	2	3	3	9	−6	5	

Source: Soccerway
Rules for classification: 1) Points; 2) Goal difference; 3) Goals scored; 4) Head-to-head results; 5) Drawing of lots.

==== Results ====
Home \ Away	CAR	DLG	ESM	HCO
Caracas	—	2–0	1–2	1–0
Deportivo La Guaira	1–2	—	1–0	0–0
Estudiantes de Mérida	1–1	1–1	—	3–2
Hermanos Colmenarez	0–0	4–0	2–5	—

Source: Soccerway
Legend: Blue = home team win; Yellow = draw; Red = away team win.

=== Group B ===
==== Standings ====
Pos	Team	Pld	W	D	L	GF	GA	GD	Pts	Qualification
1	Deportivo Táchira	6	3	2	1	4	2	+2	11	Qualification for Copa Sudamericana first stage
2	Academia Puerto Cabello	6	3	1	2	7	5	+2	10	Qualification for Copa Sudamericana first stage
3	Deportivo Lara	6	3	0	3	4	6	−2	9	
4	Portuguesa	6	1	1	4	3	5	−2	4	

Source: Soccerway
Rules for classification: 1) Points; 2) Goal difference; 3) Goals scored; 4) Head-to-head results; 5) Drawing of lots.

==== Results ====
Home \ Away	APC	LAR	TAC	POR
Academia Puerto Cabello	—	3–1	0–0	0–2
Deportivo Lara	1–0	—	0–2	1–0
Deportivo Táchira	0–2	1–0	—	0–0
Portuguesa	1–2	0–1	0–1	—

Source: Soccerway
Legend: Blue = home team win; Yellow = draw; Red = away team win.

== Final ==
The final match was hosted by the team with the best performance in the first stage of the season.

30 October 2022
18:30 UTC−4

Metropolitanos	1–1 (a.e.t.)	Monagas
Ortiz 101'	Report	Navas 91'
Penalties
Vargas (penalty scored); Moreira (penalty missed); Gómez (penalty scored); Antón (penalty scored); Cermeño (penalty scored)	4–3	(penalty missed) F. González; (penalty scored) Peralta; (penalty scored) Navas; (penalty missed) Zalzman; (penalty scored) Martínez

Estadio Olímpico de la UCV, Caracas
Attendance: 11,247
Referee: Jesús Valenzuela

== Top goalscorers ==
Rank	Player	Club	Goals
1	(Colombia) Kevin Viveros	Carabobo	21
2	(Colombia) Juan Camilo Zapata	Hermanos Colmenarez	19
3	(Venezuela) Jovanny Bolívar	Deportivo La Guaira	17
4	(Venezuela) Richard Blanco	Mineros de Guayana	13
4	(Venezuela) Aquiles Ocanto	Monagas	13
6	(Venezuela) Antonio Romero	Zamora	11
6	(Panama) Guido Rouse	Zulia	11
8	(Venezuela) Erickson Gallardo	Zamora	10
8	(Venezuela) Charlis Ortiz	Metropolitanos	10
10	(Venezuela) Samuel Sosa	Academia Puerto Cabello	9

Source: Liga FUTVE
