= 2021 Liga FUTVE =

Liga FUTVE
- Season: 2021
- Dates: 11 April – 11 December 2021
- Champions: Deportivo Táchira (9th title)
- Relegated: Yaracuyanos; LALA; Trujillanos
- Copa Libertadores: Deportivo Táchira; Caracas; Monagas; Deportivo Lara
- Copa Sudamericana: Deportivo La Guaira; Estudiantes de Mérida; Metropolitanos; Hermanos Colmenarez
- Matches: 304
- Goals: 806 (2.65 per match)
- Top goalscorer: Samson Akinyoola (18 goals)
- Biggest home win: Zamora 6–0 Trujillanos (11 June); Hnos. Colmenarez 6–0 Trujillanos (15 July); Metropolitanos 6–0 LALA (21 October)
- Biggest away win: Trujillanos 0–7 Est. Mérida (3 June); Trujillanos 0–7 Dep. Táchira (3 October)
- Highest scoring: Est. Mérida 6–2 Hnos. Colmenarez (13 June)

The 2021 Primera División season, officially Liga de Fútbol Profesional Venezolano or Liga FUTVE, was the 65th season of the Venezuelan Primera División, the top-flight football league in Venezuela, and the 40th season since the start of the professional era. The season started on 11 April and ended on 11 December 2021.

Deportivo Táchira were the champions, winning their ninth league title by defeating Caracas 4–2 on penalties following a 0–0 draw after extra time in the final. Deportivo La Guaira were the defending champions, but they were eliminated in Fase Final A.

== Format changes ==
The league was expanded to 21 teams as relegation was suspended for the previous season due to the COVID-19 pandemic. The 21 teams were divided into three groups of seven teams each according to geographic location, with the teams playing the other teams in their group four times (twice at home and twice away) in a round-robin format. The top four teams in each group advanced to the next stage, the top two to Fase Final A and the next two to Fase Final B. In both Hexagonals, the teams faced each other twice, with the champion being decided in Fase Final A. The teams of Fase Final A and the top two of Fase Final B qualified for international competitions.

Originally, the two worst ranked teams among the last-placed teams would be relegated, and the other one would be involved in a play-off against the Segunda División runner-up to determine the final spot in the 2022 season. However, on 24 September 2021 the FVF announced that all three last-placed teams in the groups would be relegated, with only one promotion from the Segunda División.

== Teams ==
=== Stadia and locations ===
Locations of the 2021 Primera División teams

Relegated to 2021 Segunda División None (relegation suspended)	Promoted to 2021 Primera División: 1 / Hermanos Colmenarez; 2 / Universidad Central

Team	Manager	City	Stadium	Capacity
Academia Puerto Cabello	(Venezuela) Jeremy Nowak (caretaker)	Puerto Cabello	La Bombonerita	7,500
Aragua	(Venezuela) Edson Rodríguez	Maracay	Olímpico Hermanos Ghersi Páez	14,000
Atlético Venezuela	(Venezuela) José Hernández	Caracas	Brígido Iriarte	10,000
Carabobo	(Venezuela) Enrique Maggiolo	Valencia	Misael Delgado	10,400
Caracas	(Venezuela) Noel Sanvicente	Caracas	Olímpico de la UCV	23,940
Deportivo La Guaira	(Venezuela) Daniel Farías	Caracas	Olímpico de la UCV	23,940
Deportivo Lara	(Venezuela) Leonardo González	Cabudare	Metropolitano de Cabudare	47,913
Deportivo Táchira	(Venezuela) Juan Tolisano	San Cristóbal	Polideportivo de Pueblo Nuevo	38,755
Estudiantes de Mérida	(Venezuela) Leonel Vielma	Mérida	Metropolitano de Mérida	42,200
Gran Valencia	(Venezuela) Bladimir Morales	Valencia	Misael Delgado	10,400
Hermanos Colmenarez	(Venezuela) Luis Alberto Pacheco	Barinas	Reinaldo Melo	8,000
LALA	(Venezuela) Elías Emmons	Ciudad Guayana	Polideportivo Cachamay	41,600
Metropolitanos	(Venezuela) José María Morr	Caracas	Olímpico de la UCV	23,940
Mineros de Guayana	(Venezuela) Pastor Márquez	Ciudad Guayana	Polideportivo Cachamay	41,600
Monagas	(Venezuela) Jhonny Ferreira	Maturín	Monumental de Maturín	51,796
Portuguesa	(Venezuela) Alí Cañas	Acarigua	General José Antonio Páez	18,000
Trujillanos	(Venezuela) Jesús Valiente	Valera	José Alberto Pérez	25,000
Universidad Central	(Venezuela) Daniel Sasso	Caracas	Olímpico de la UCV	23,940
Yaracuyanos	(Venezuela) Manuel González	San Felipe	Florentino Oropeza	10,000
Zamora	(Venezuela) Alfarabi Romero (caretaker)	Barinas	Agustín Tovar	29,800
Zulia	(Venezuela) Henry Meléndez	Maracaibo	José "Pachencho" Romero	40,800

==== Managerial changes ====
Team	Outgoing manager	Manner of departure	Date of vacancy	Position in table	Incoming manager	Date of appointment
Yaracuyanos	(Venezuela) Jesús Cabello	Resigned	15 December 2020	Pre-season	(Paraguay) Daniel Farrar	10 January 2021
Trujillanos	(Venezuela) Martín Carrillo	Resigned	17 December 2020	Pre-season	(Argentina) Gustavo Romanello	11 March 2021
Deportivo Lara	(Venezuela) Leonardo González	Mutual consent	20 December 2020	Pre-season	(Argentina) Martín Brignani	25 January 2021
Carabobo	(Venezuela) José Parada	End of contract	31 December 2020	Pre-season	(Venezuela) Enrique Maggiolo	14 February 2021
Zulia	(Colombia) Alex García King	End of contract	31 December 2020	Pre-season	(Venezuela) Frank Flores	5 February 2021
Estudiantes de Mérida	(Argentina) Martín Brignani	Resigned	5 January 2021	Pre-season	(Venezuela) Leonel Vielma	12 January 2021
Mineros	(Venezuela) Leonel Vielma	Signed by Estudiantes de Mérida	12 January 2021	Pre-season	(Venezuela) Jesús Cabello	11 March 2021
Zamora	(Venezuela) Luis Terán	End of caretaker spell	24 January 2021	Pre-season	(Argentina) Marcelo Gómez	24 January 2021
Trujillanos	(Argentina) Gustavo Romanello	Mutual consent	29 March 2021	Pre-season	(Venezuela) Junior Lennin Díaz	29 March 2021
Academia Puerto Cabello	(Venezuela) Carlos Maldonado	Sacked	11 April 2021	Pre-season	(Argentina) José Basualdo	24 April 2021
Aragua	(Venezuela) Enrique García	Resigned	8 May 2021	7th, Central Group	(Venezuela) Edson Rodríguez	12 May 2021
Yaracuyanos	(Paraguay) Daniel Farrar	Resigned	16 May 2021	5th, Central Group	(Venezuela) Tony Franco	20 May 2021
Trujillanos	(Venezuela) Junior Lennin Díaz	Resigned	17 May 2021	7th, Occidental Group	(Venezuela) Jesús Valiente	18 May 2021
Universidad Central	(Venezuela) Pedro Acosta	Mutual consent	17 June 2021	7th, Oriental Group	(Venezuela) Daniel Sasso	17 June 2021
LALA	(Venezuela) Elías Emmons	Sacked	23 July 2021	7th, Oriental Group	(Venezuela) Álvaro Valencia	26 July 2021
Deportivo Lara	(Argentina) Martín Brignani	Sacked	31 July 2021	5th, Central Group	(Venezuela) Leonardo González	2 August 2021
Mineros	(Venezuela) Jesús Cabello	Mutual consent	2 August 2021	4th, Oriental Group	(Venezuela) Pastor Márquez	6 August 2021
LALA	(Venezuela) Álvaro Valencia	Resigned	10 August 2021	7th, Oriental Group	(Venezuela) Elías Emmons	13 August 2021
Zulia	(Venezuela) Frank Flores	Mutual consent	16 August 2021	5th, Occidental Group	(Venezuela) Henry Meléndez	16 August 2021
Academia Puerto Cabello	(Argentina) José Basualdo	Sacked	23 August 2021	7th, Central Group	(Venezuela) Martín Carrillo	26 August 2021
Zamora	(Argentina) Marcelo Gómez	Sacked	30 August 2021	6th, Occidental Group	(Venezuela) Alfarabi Romero (Note: Caretaker manager until the end of the tournament.)	30 August 2021
Yaracuyanos	(Venezuela) Tony Franco	Resigned	23 September 2021	7th, Central Group	(Venezuela) Manuel González	24 September 2021
Atlético Venezuela	(Venezuela) Jair Díaz	Demoted to assistant manager	1 October 2021	3rd, Oriental Group	(Venezuela) José Hernández	1 October 2021
Academia Puerto Cabello	(Venezuela) Martín Carrillo	Sacked	3 November 2021	2nd, Fase Final B	(Venezuela) Jeremy Nowak	4 November 2021

== First stage ==
The first stage began on 11 April and ended on 22 October 2021. The 21 teams were divided in three groups of seven teams each. The top two teams of each group advanced to Fase Final A and the next two to Fase Final B. The last-placed teams were relegated.

=== Occidental Group ===
==== Standings ====
Pos	Team	Pld	W	D	L	GF	GA	GD	Pts	Qualification or relegation
1	Deportivo Táchira	24	15	4	5	49	22	+27	49	Advance to Fase Final A
2	Estudiantes de Mérida	24	12	6	6	39	25	+14	42	Advance to Fase Final A
3	Portuguesa	24	11	6	7	32	21	+11	39	Advance to Fase Final B
4	Hermanos Colmenarez	24	8	12	4	43	35	+8	36	Advance to Fase Final B
5	Zamora	24	8	8	8	36	30	+6	32	
6	Zulia	24	8	7	9	37	32	+5	31	
7	Trujillanos (R)	24	0	1	23	8	79	−71	1	Relegation to Segunda División

Source: Soccerway
Rules for classification: 1) Points; 2) Goal difference; 3) Goals scored.
(R) Relegated

==== Results ====
Home \ Away	TAC	ESM	HCO	POR	TRU	ZAM	ZUL	TAC	ESM	HCO	POR	TRU	ZAM	ZUL
Deportivo Táchira	—	1–0	2–1	1–0	2–0	3–0	4–1	—	1–2	1–1	4–1	3–0	1–2	3–0
Estudiantes de Mérida	1–1	—	6–2	0–2	4–0	1–0	1–0	0–2	—	1–2	1–0	4–2	0–0	2–1
Hermanos Colmenarez	2–2	4–2	—	1–3	6–0	3–2	0–0	1–1	1–1	—	3–1	2–1	1–1	0–2
Portuguesa	0–3	3–0	0–0	—	5–0	2–1	0–1	2–0	0–0	1–1	—	1–0	0–1	1–1
Trujillanos	0–3	0–7	0–2	0–2	—	0–4	1–2	0–7	1–1	0–2	1–2	—	0–5	0–3
Zamora	2–1	0–1	2–2	0–0	6–0	—	0–3 (Note: Match awarded 3–0 to Zulia due to Zamora fielding the ineligible player Anthony Graterol. The match originally ended with Zamora winning by a 2–1 score.)	0–1	0–0	1–1	1–4	2–1	—	2–1
Zulia	5–0	1–2	2–2	1–2	2–1	3–3	—	1–2	1–2	3–3	0–0	2–0	1–1	—

Source: Soccerway
Legend: Blue = home team win; Yellow = draw; Red = away team win.

=== Central Group ===
==== Standings ====
Pos	Team	Pld	W	D	L	GF	GA	GD	Pts	Qualification or relegation
1	Deportivo La Guaira	24	10	8	6	33	22	+11	38	Advance to Fase Final A
2	Deportivo Lara	24	8	10	6	42	30	+12	34	Advance to Fase Final A
3	Academia Puerto Cabello	24	8	10	6	24	21	+3	34	Advance to Fase Final B
4	Aragua	24	8	9	7	22	25	−3	33	Advance to Fase Final B
5	Gran Valencia	24	8	9	7	25	32	−7	33	
6	Carabobo	24	8	7	9	28	28	0	31	
7	Yaracuyanos (R)	24	5	5	14	16	32	−16	20	Relegation to Segunda División

Source: Soccerway
Rules for classification: 1) Points; 2) Goal difference; 3) Goals scored.
(R) Relegated

==== Results ====
Home \ Away	APC	ARA	CBO	DLG	LAR	GVA	YAR	APC	ARA	CBO	DLG	LAR	GVA	YAR
Academia Puerto Cabello	—	1–0	0–0	0–0	0–3	1–1	1–2	—	1–1	3–0	0–2	1–3	4–1	1–0
Aragua	0–0	—	2–0	2–0	0–0	0–2	1–1	1–1	—	2–1	0–1	0–0	1–0	3–0
Carabobo	2–2	3–1	—	1–1	1–1	2–3	0–1	1–0	2–0	—	1–2	2–0	1–0	2–0
Deportivo La Guaira	0–1	0–0	4–2	—	4–1	0–0	1–1	0–0	5–0	0–2	—	0–2	3–1	1–0
Deportivo Lara	2–2	4–1	0–0	1–2	—	5–1	1–2	1–3	1–1	2–1	2–2	—	1–1	1–1
Gran Valencia	0–0	2–2	1–0	0–0	3–3	—	1–0	1–0	0–1	1–1	2–1	0–5	—	1–0
Yaracuyanos	0–1	0–1	1–2	0–2	1–0	1–1	—	0–1	0–2	1–1	3–2	1–3	0–2	—

Source: Soccerway
Legend: Blue = home team win; Yellow = draw; Red = away team win.

=== Oriental Group ===
==== Standings ====
Pos	Team	Pld	W	D	L	GF	GA	GD	Pts	Qualification or relegation
1	Caracas	24	14	6	4	50	27	+23	48	Advance to Fase Final A
2	Monagas	24	13	6	5	44	27	+17	45	Advance to Fase Final A
3	Metropolitanos	24	9	8	7	42	31	+11	35	Advance to Fase Final B
4	Atlético Venezuela	24	9	7	8	36	38	−2	34	Advance to Fase Final B
5	Universidad Central	24	8	7	9	32	30	+2	31	
6	Mineros de Guayana	24	8	5	11	25	33	−8	29	
7	LALA (R)	24	2	3	19	15	58	−43	9	Relegation to Segunda División

Source: Soccerway
Rules for classification: 1) Points; 2) Goal difference; 3) Goals scored.
(R) Relegated

==== Results ====
Home \ Away	AVE	CAR	LAL	MET	MIN	MON	UCV	AVE	CAR	LAL	MET	MIN	MON	UCV
Atlético Venezuela	—	0–4	4–2	3–2	1–0	1–2	1–1	—	0–2	3–1	4–1	2–1	2–4	1–0
Caracas	3–1	—	1–2	1–1	3–0	2–0	2–0	0–3	—	5–2	1–3	2–0	4–2	2–1
LALA	2–2	1–0	—	1–5	1–2	0–3	0–2	1–1	0–2	—	1–3	0–3	0–2	0–1
Metropolitanos	1–1	1–3	1–0	—	3–0	2–4	3–2	2–1	1–1	6–0 (Note: Match abandoned at half-time with Metropolitanos leading 6–0 since LALA did not show up for the second half.)	—	3–0	1–2	1–1
Mineros de Guayana	1–0	2–2	3–0	1–0	—	2–1	3–1	1–2	1–1	2–0	0–0	—	0–2	1–1
Monagas	0–0	2–2	1–1	3–1	2–0	—	4–0	1–1	1–3	3–0	0–0	1–1	—	2–1
Universidad Central	2–2	2–3	2–0	0–0	1–0	0–2	—	4–0	1–1	1–0	1–1	4–1	3–0	—

Source: Soccerway
Legend: Blue = home team win; Yellow = draw; Red = away team win.

== Fase Final A ==
Fase Final A was contested by the top two teams of the first stage groups, which played each other twice. The top two teams advanced to the final and also qualified for the 2022 Copa Libertadores along with the next best two teams, whilst the remaining two teams qualified for the 2022 Copa Sudamericana.

=== Standings ===
Pos	Team	Pld	W	D	L	GF	GA	GD	Pts	Qualification
1	Caracas	10	5	3	2	20	6	+14	18	Advance to Final and qualification for Copa Libertadores group stage
2	Deportivo Táchira	10	5	3	2	14	9	+5	18	Advance to Final and qualification for Copa Libertadores group stage
3	Monagas	10	5	2	3	14	12	+2	17	Qualification for Copa Libertadores second stage
4	Deportivo Lara	10	2	5	3	10	9	+1	11	Qualification for Copa Libertadores first stage
5	Deportivo La Guaira	10	2	3	5	8	20	−12	9	Qualification for Copa Sudamericana first stage
6	Estudiantes de Mérida	10	2	2	6	12	22	−10	8	Qualification for Copa Sudamericana first stage

Source: Soccerway
Rules for classification: 1) Points; 2) Goal difference; 3) Goals scored.

=== Results ===
Home \ Away	CAR	DLG	LAR	TAC	ESM	MON
Caracas	—	4–0	2–2	2–0	4–1	2–0
Deportivo La Guaira	0–5	—	0–0	0–0	2–1	2–0
Deportivo Lara	0–0	1–1	—	2–1	4–0	1–3
Deportivo Táchira	1–0	4–2	0–0	—	2–0	3–1
Estudiantes de Mérida	1–1	4–1	1–0	1–2	—	2–2
Monagas	1–0	1–0	1–0	1–1	4–1	—

Source: Soccerway
Legend: Blue = home team win; Yellow = draw; Red = away team win.

== Fase Final B ==
Fase Final B was contested by the third- and fourth-placed teams of the first stage groups, which played each other twice. The top two teams qualified for the 2022 Copa Sudamericana. Atlético Venezuela originally qualified to compete in Fase Final B on sporting merit, but withdrew due to their failure to comply with the requirements imposed by the FVF. Due to this, only five teams competed in Fase Final B.

=== Standings ===
Pos	Team	Pld	W	D	L	GF	GA	GD	Pts	Qualification
1	Metropolitanos	8	4	2	2	10	10	0	14	Qualification for Copa Sudamericana first stage
2	Hermanos Colmenarez	8	4	1	3	13	9	+4	13	Qualification for Copa Sudamericana first stage
3	Portuguesa	8	2	4	2	9	7	+2	10	
4	Aragua	8	2	4	2	10	11	−1	10	
5	Academia Puerto Cabello	8	1	3	4	10	15	−5	6	
6	Atlético Venezuela	0	0	0	0	0	0	0	0	Withdrew

Source: Soccerway
Rules for classification: 1) Points; 2) Goal difference; 3) Goals scored.

=== Results ===
Home \ Away	APC	ARA	AVE	HCO	MET	POR
Academia Puerto Cabello	—	2–3	—	2–2	1–2	0–0
Aragua	2–2	—	—	1–0	0–2	1–1
Atlético Venezuela	—	—	—	—	—	—
Hermanos Colmenarez	3–1	1–0	—	—	4–0	3–1
Metropolitanos	1–2	2–2	—	1–0	—	1–0
Portuguesa	2–0	1–1	—	3–0	1–1	—

Source: Soccerway
Legend: Blue = home team win; Yellow = draw; Red = away team win.

== Final ==
The final was played at the Estadio Olímpico de la UCV in Caracas on 11 December 2021.

11 December 2021
18:30 UTC−4

Deportivo Táchira	0–0 (a.e.t.)	Caracas
	Report
Penalties
Gómez (penalty scored); Cova (penalty scored); Camacho (penalty scored); Fernández (penalty scored)	4–2	(penalty scored) R. Celis; (penalty scored) Castillo; (penalty missed) Echeverría; (penalty missed) Rivero

Estadio Olímpico de la UCV, Caracas
Attendance: 14,938
Referee: Jesús Valenzuela

== Top goalscorers ==
Rank	Player	Club	Goals
1	(Benin) Samson Akinyoola	Caracas	18
2	(Venezuela) Richard Celis	Caracas	17
3	(Venezuela) Juan Carlos Ortiz	Monagas	16
4	(Paraguay) Adrián Fernández	Portuguesa	14
4	(Venezuela) Franklin González	Monagas	14
6	(Colombia) Anuar Peláez	Hermanos Colmenarez	13
6	(Colombia) Juan Camilo Zapata	Hermanos Colmenarez	13
8	(Panama) Alfredo Stephens	Aragua	12
9	(Venezuela) Armando Araque	Estudiantes de Mérida	11
9	(Venezuela) Joel Infante	Atlético Venezuela	11
9	(Venezuela) Rubén Rojas	Deportivo Lara	11
9	(Colombia) Tommy Tobar	Atlético Venezuela	11

Source: Soccerway

== Best XI ==
The Liga FUTVE announced the best XI team of the 2021 Liga FUTVE season between 14 and 17 December 2021. Additionally, seven relevant players were named in order to complete the team.

Pos	Player	Team	App (S/B)	MP	Yellow card	Red card	Goals	Assi
GK	(Venezuela) Cristopher Varela	Deportivo Táchira	29 (29/0)	2640	3	0	0	0
RB	(Venezuela) Eduardo Fereira	Caracas	31 (30/1)	2497	5	1	3	6
CB	(Venezuela) Jesús Quintero	Deportivo Táchira	20 (17/3)	1560	3	0	0	0
CB	(Venezuela) Carlos Rivero	Caracas	27 (27/0)	2381	5	0	2	0
LB	(Venezuela) Daniel Linárez	Estudiantes de Mérida	30 (30/0)	2612	6	0	0	11
CM	(Venezuela) Telasco Segovia	Deportivo Lara	31 (27/4)	2424	5	1	3	1
CM	(Venezuela) Maurice Cova	Deportivo Táchira	23 (18/5)	1760	7	0	2	4
RM	(Venezuela) Yerson Chacón	Deportivo Táchira	35 (31/4)	2603	3	0	9	9
LM	(Venezuela) Richard Celis	Caracas	28 (28/0)	2426	10	1	16	7
CF	(Benin) Samson Akinyoola	Caracas	34 (34/0)	2996	7	0	18	6
CF	(Venezuela) Juan Carlos Ortiz	Monagas	32 (32/0)	2860	8	0	16	9
Substitutes
GK	(Argentina) Nicolás Caprio	Monagas	32 (32/0)	2839	4	0	0	0
DF	(Venezuela) Diego Osío	Caracas	32 (30/2)	2777	7	0	1	0
DF	(Venezuela) Edwin Peraza	Monagas	29 (29/0)	2586	7	0	2	1
MF	(Venezuela) Edson Castillo	Caracas	25 (25/0)	2270	9	0	5	1
FW	(Venezuela) Edgar Pérez Greco	Deportivo Táchira	26 (25/1)	1771	3	0	10	6
FW	(Colombia) Juan Camilo Zapata	Hermanos Colmenarez	31 (26/5)	2461	5	0	12	6
FW	(Venezuela) Franklin González	Monagas	33 (27/6)	2293	2	0	15	3
