= Wilver Jiménez =

Venezuelan footballer (born 1990)

Personal information
- Full name: Wilver Eduardo Jiménez
- Date of birth: 16 March 1990 (age 36)
- Place of birth: Caracas, Venezuela
- Height: 1.82 m (6 ft 0 in)
- Position: Goalkeeper

Team information
- Current team: LALA FC
- Number: 22

Senior career*
Years	Team	Apps	(Gls)
2011–2019	Atlético Venezuela C.F.	16	(0)
2017–2018	→ Margarita F.C. (loan)		
2019–2020	UCV F.C.		
2020–2021	Llaneros EF		
2021–	LALA FC	1	(0)
- * Club domestic league appearances and goals as of 23 November 2021

Wilver Eduardo Jiménez (born 16 March 1990) is a Venezuelan footballer who plays as a goalkeeper for Venezuelan Primera División club LALA FC.

== Career ==
=== Atlético Venezuela ===
Jiménez was introduced to the club through a tryout in his hometown of Caracas, attended by then-head coach José Hernández. He impressed Hernández and was offered a contract, making his debut for the club in May 2012 against Policía de Lara.
