= Pablo Andrea =

Venezuelan footballer (born 2001)

Personal information
- Full name: Pablo Andrés Andrea Mirabal
- Date of birth: 6 April 2001 (age 25)
- Place of birth: San Fernando de Apure, Venezuela
- Height: 1.71 m (5 ft 7 in)
- Position: Forward

Youth career
- San Fernando FC
- Zamora

Senior career*
Years	Team	Apps	(Gls)
2018–2019	Zamora	1	(0)
2020–2021	Yaracuyanos	6	(0)
2021–202?	LALA		
- * Club domestic league appearances and goals as of 21:38, 23 December 2021 (UTC)

Pablo Andrés Andrea Mirabal (born 6 April 2001) is a Venezuelan footballer who plays as a forward.

== Career ==
=== Club career ===
Andrea is a product of San Fernando FC in San Fernando de Apure and Zamora. He got his professional debut for Zamora on 26 September 2018 against Metropolitanos, when he came on as a substitute for Richard Almeida with five minutes left. This was his only official appearance during his time at the club, before leaving ahead of the 2020 season to join newly promoted Venezuelan Primera División side Yaracuyanos.

Andrea got his official debut for Yaracuyanos on 1 March 2020 against Estudiantes de Mérida. On 15 April 2021, Andrea moved to LALA FC.
