= Manuel González (football manager) =

Venezuelan football manager

Personal information
- Full name: Manuel Eduardo González Mejías
- Date of birth: 8 March 1992 (age 34)
- Place of birth: Barquisimeto, Venezuela

Youth career
- Years: Team
- 2006–2010: Deportivo Lara

Managerial career
- 2019–2020: Yaracuy (youth)
- 2020: Deportivo Lara (youth)
- 2021: Yaracuyanos (assistant)
- 2021: Yaracuyanos
- 2023: Titanes

Manuel Eduardo González Mejías (born 8 March 1992) is a Venezuelan football manager.

== Career ==
Born in Barquisimeto, González played as a youth for Deportivo Lara before retiring from football at the age of just 18 to become a coach. He then worked as a coordinator at Academia Rey before returning to Deportivo Lara in the methodology department.

In 2019, González coached the youth setup of Yaracuy before returning to Deportivo Lara in July 2020. Ahead of the 2021 campaign, he was appointed assistant manager of Yaracuyanos.

On 24 September 2021, González was named manager of Yaracuyanos in the place of Tony Franco. After failing to avoid relegation, he left the club.

On 22 December 2022, González was appointed in charge of Segunda División side Titanes, replacing Pastor Márquez. He left the club in April, after seven matches.
