= Edwin Quilagury =

Venezuelan football manager (born 1977)

Personal information
- Full name: Edwin Humberto Quilagury Sayago
- Date of birth: 16 June 1977 (age 49)
- Place of birth: Ureña, Venezuela
- Position: Centre-back

Youth career
- Marítimo de Venezuela

Senior career*
Years	Team	Apps	(Gls)
1993–1996	Marítimo de Venezuela		
1996–1997	Mineros		
1997–2001	Nacional Táchira		
2001–2003	Deportivo Táchira	50	(5)
2003–2004	Deportivo Anzoátegui		(5)
2004	Zulia		
2004–2005	Atlético El Vigía		
2005	Maracaibo		
2005–2007	Zulia		(1)
2007–2008	Carabobo		

Managerial career
- 2009–2013: Ureña
- 2013–2015: Monagas (assistant)
- 2014: ULA
- 2014–2015: Monagas (assistant)
- 2015–2016: Monagas
- 2016–2017: Real Frontera
- 2017: Atlético El Vigía
- 2018: Llaneros de Guanare
- 2019: Yaracuyanos
- 2019–2020: Llaneros de Guanare
- 2021–2022: Real Frontera
- 2023: Titanes
- 2024: Ureña
- * Club domestic league appearances and goals

Edwin Humberto Quilagury (born 3 September 1987) is a Venezuelan football manager.

== Playing career ==
Born in Ureña, Táchira, Quilagury made his senior debut with Marítimo de Venezuela in 1993, aged 16. He moved to Mineros in 1996, and joined Nacional Táchira in the following year.

Quilagury subsequently represented Deportivo Táchira, Deportivo Anzoátegui, Zulia (two stints), Atlético El Vigía, Maracaibo and Carabobo. He retired with the latter in 2008, aged 30.

== Managerial career ==
After retiring, Quilagury was one of the founding members of Ureña SC, being their manager until 2013. He subsequently became an assistant at Monagas, before being named manager of ULA in 2014.

On 16 June 2015, after spending another period as an assistant, Quilagury was appointed manager of Monagas. He won the Segunda División with the club, but left the club on 3 March 2016.

Shortly after leaving Monagas, Quilagury was named manager of Real Frontera in the second tier. He resigned on 28 March 2017, and took over fellow league team El Vigía five days later.

Quilagury left El Vigía on 14 September 2017, and took over Llaneros de Guanare the following January. He also won the second division with the club, before leaving in December 2018 to take over Yaracuyanos.

Quilagury left Yaracuyanos on 11 June 2019, and returned to Llaneros in July. He remained at the club despite their administrative relegation, before returning to Real Forontera for the 2021 season.

Quilagury left Real Frontera on 17 November 2022, and was appointed manager of Titanes on 25 April 2023. In January 2024, he returned to Ureña as manager, with the club now in the top tier, but the club later withdrew from playing.

== Honours ==
Monagas

- Venezuelan Segunda División: 2015

Llaneros de Guanare

- Venezuelan Segunda División: 2018
