= Jair Díaz =

Jair Díaz may refer to:

- Jair Díaz (football manager) (born 1980), Venezuelan football manager
- Jair Díaz (footballer) (born 1998), Mexican footballer

== See also ==
- Jairo Díaz (cyclist) (born 1945), Colombian cyclist
- Jairo Díaz (born 1991), Venezuelan baseball player
