= Yhonatann Yustiz =

Venezuelan football player (born 1992)

Yhonathan Yustiz
Personal information
- Full name: Yhonathan Alexander Yustiz Linarez
- Date of birth: 27 January 1992 (age 34)
- Place of birth: Maracay, Venezuela
- Height: 1.83 m (6 ft 0 in)
- Position: Goalkeeper

Team information
- Current team: Metropolitanos F.C.
- Number: 1

Senior career*
Years	Team	Apps	(Gls)
2012–2017	Caracas F.C.	11	(0)
2017–2021	Aragua F.C.	129	(0)
2022–2024	Portuguesa	96	(0)
2025	Anzoátegui	18	(0)
2025	Tecnico Universitario	12	(0)
2026-	Metropolitanos F.C.	6	(0)
- * Club domestic league appearances and goals as of 11 March 2026

Yhonathan Alexander Yustiz Linarez (born 27 January 1992) is a Venezuelan footballer who plays as a goalkeeper for Metropolitanos F.C..

== Career ==
=== Aragua ===
Yustiz joined Aragua F.C. in 2017, making his league debut during the club's opening match of the season, a 3–1 defeat to Zamora. He became the club's starting goalkeeper during his first season, quickly racking up 50 appearances through just a year and a half of competition. By the midpoint of the following season, Yustiz had registered seven clean sheets through 13 matches, as Aragua finished fifth in the Apertura tournament. In 2021, Yustiz celebrated his fifth year with the club, and also made his 120th appearance for Aragua.

=== Portuguesa ===
Ahead of the 2022 season, Yustiz moved to Portuguesa. Following the midpoint of the 2022 Venezuelan Primera División season, media outlet Idioma Futve named Yustiz amongst their team of the season. At the conclusion of the season, Yustiz had kept the most clean sheets, tallying 15 through 36 matches.
