= Leonel Vielma =

Venezuelan footballer (born 1978)

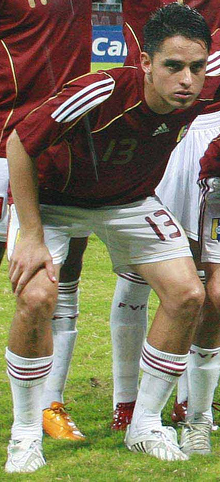

Personal information
- Full name: Leonel Gerardo Vielma Peña
- Date of birth: 30 August 1978 (age 48)
- Place of birth: Mérida, Venezuela
- Height: 1.78 m (5 ft 10 in)
- Position: Defender

Senior career*
Years	Team	Apps	(Gls)
1999–2001	Estudiantes de Mérida		
2002–2003	Maracaibo		
2003–2004	Deportivo Táchira		
2004	Deportivo Cali	19	(0)
2004–2005	Caracas		
2005	Once Caldas	5	(0)
2005–2006	Italmaracaibo		
2006–2007	Caracas		
2008	Santa Fe	28	(2)
2009–2010	Caracas		
2010	Estudiantes de Mérida		
2011	Deportivo Lara	3	(0)
2011–2012	Estudiantes de Mérida	23	(2)
2012–2013	Atlético El Vigía	24	(1)
2013–2014	Estudiantes de Mérida		
2015	Atlético Socopó		
2016	Ureña	13	(2)
2016	Estudiantes de Mérida	14	(1)
2017	Atlético El Vigía		
2017	Estudiantes de Caracas		

International career
2000–2011	Venezuela	56	(4)

Managerial career
- 2018: Petroleros de Anzoátegui
- 2019: TFC Maracaibo
- 2019: Mineros (assistant)
- 2020–2021: Mineros
- 2021–2022: Estudiantes de Mérida
- 2022: Aragua
- 2023–2024: Inter de Barinas (Note: Club was named Hermanos Colmenarez until January 2024)
- * Club domestic league appearances and goals

Leonel Gerardo Vielma Peña (born 30 August 1978) is a Venezuelan football manager and former player who played as a defender.

== International career ==
Born in Mérida, Vielma has played over 50 games for the Venezuela national team and has played club football in Venezuela and Colombia.

=== International goals ===
#	Date	Venue	Opponent	Score	Result	Competition
1.	20 August 2003	José Pachencho Romero, Maracaibo, Venezuela	Haiti	1–0	3-2	Friendly
2.	17 November 2004	River Plate Stadium, Buenos Aires, Argentina	Argentina	3–2	3-2	2006 World Cup qualifying
3.	25 May 2007	Metropolitano de Mérida, Mérida, Venezuela	Honduras	1–0	2-1	Friendly
4.	20 August 2008	Estadio Olímpico José Antonio Anzoátegui, Puerto La Cruz, Venezuela	Syria	1–0	4-1	Friendly
Correct as of 7 October 2015
