= Cristopher Varela =

Venezuelan footballer (born 1999)

Personal information
- Full name: Cristopher Javier Varela Caicedo
- Date of birth: November 27, 1999 (age 26)
- Place of birth: San Cristóbal, Táchira, Venezuela
- Height: 1.89 m (6 ft 2 1/2 in)
- Position: Goalkeeper

Team information
- Current team: Deportivo La Guaira

Senior career*
Years	Team	Apps	(Gls)
2017–2022	Deportivo Táchira	66	(1)
2023	Atletico Bucaramanga	16	(0)
2024	Deportivo La Guaira	32	(0)
2025	La Equidad	16	(0)
2025–	Deportivo La Guaira	23	(0)

International career^{‡}
2018–2019	Venezuela U20	4	(0)
2020	Venezuela U23	4	(0)
2026–	Venezuela	2	(0)
Medal record
Men's football
Representing Venezuela
FIFA Series
Runner-up	2026 Uzbekistan
- * Club domestic league appearances and goals as of 10 March 2026 ‡ National team caps and goals as of 19:26, 6 October 2026 (UTC)

Cristopher Javier Varela Caicedo (born 27 November 1999) is a Venezuelan footballer who plays as a goalkeeper for Venezuelan club Deportivo La Guaira and the Venezuela national team.

== Career statistics ==
=== Club ===
As of 19 September 2026.

Club	Season	League			Cup		Continental		Other		Total	
Club	Season	Division	Apps	Goals	Apps	Goals	Apps	Goals	Apps	Goals	Apps	Goals
Deportivo Táchira	2017	Liga FUTVE	2	0	0	0	—		—		2	0
Deportivo Táchira	2018	Liga FUTVE	3	0	0	0	0	0	—		3	0
Deportivo Táchira	2019	Liga FUTVE	2	0	0	0	—		—		2	0
Deportivo Táchira	2021	Liga FUTVE	29	0	0	0	8 (Note: Six appearances in Copa Libertadores, two appearances in Copa Sudamericana)	0	—		37	0
Deportivo Táchira	2022	Liga FUTVE	30	0	0	0	9 (Note: Five appearances in Copa Libertadores, four appearances in Copa Sudamericana)	0	—		39	0
Deportivo Táchira	Total		66	0	0	0	17	0	—		83	0
Atletico Bucaramanga	2023	Liga DIMAYOR	16	0	2	0	—		—		18	0
Deportivo La Guaira	2024	Liga FUTVE	32	0	2	0	1 (Note: Appearance in Copa Sudamericana)	0	—		35	0
La Equidad	2025	Liga DIMAYOR	16	0	—		—		—		16	0
Deportivo La Guaira	2025	Liga FUTVE	19	0	6	0	—		—		25	0
Deportivo La Guaira	2026	Liga FUTVE	25	0	0	0	5 (Note: Appearances in Copa Libertadores)	0	—		30	0
Deportivo La Guaira	Total		44	0	6	0	5	0	—		55	0
Career total			174	0	10	0	23	0	0	0	207	0

=== International ===
As of match played 6 October 2026.

National team	Year	Apps	Goals
Venezuela	2026	2	0
Total		2	0

== Honours ==
Caracas FC

- Copa Venezuela: 2013

Monagas

- Primera División Venezolana: 2017
- Torneo Apertura: 2017

Junior

- Categoría Primera A: 2023-II
- Superliga Colombiana: 2020
