= Maikol =

Maikol is a given name. Notable people with the given name include:

- Maikol Benassi (born 1989), Italian footballer
- Maikol Negro (born 1988), Italian footballer
- Maikol Vivas (born 1990), Venezuelan footballer
