= Jesús Yendis =

Venezuelan footballer (born 1998)

Personal information
- Full name: Jesús Natividad Yendis Gómez
- Date of birth: 18 March 1998 (age 28)
- Place of birth: Puerto La Cruz, Venezuela
- Height: 1.77 m (5 ft 10 in)
- Position: Defender

Team information
- Current team: Caracas FC
- Number: 13

Senior career*
Years	Team	Apps	(Gls)
2017–2018	ACCD Mineros de Guayana		
2018	Anzoátegui FC	15	(1)
2019–2020	Monagas SC	31	(0)
2021	Inter de Barinas	30	(1)
2022	Knattspyrnufélagið Fram	14	(0)
2023	Inter de Barinas	26	(4)
2024	Academia Puerto Cabello	19	(0)
2025–	Caracas FC	18	(0)
- * Club domestic league appearances and goals as of 9 November 2025

Jesús Natividad Yendis Gómez (born 18 March 1998) is a Venezuelan footballer who plays as a defender for Caracas FC.

== Early life ==
Yendis was born on 18 March 1998. Born in Puerto La Cruz, Venezuela, he is a native of Anzoátegui, Venezuela and the son of Jesús.

== Career ==
Yendis started his career with Venezuelan side ACCD Mineros de Guayana in 2017. Subsequently, he signed for Venezuelan side Inter de Barinas in 2021, where he made thirty league appearances and scored one goal. Venezuelan newspaper Diario Meridiano wrote that he "has become one of the main figures in the squads of coach Luis Pacheco, being solid in the defensive line" while playing for the club.

Ahead of the 2022 season, he signed for Icelandic side Knattspyrnufélagið Fram, where he made fourteen league appearances and scored zero goals. During January 2023, he returned to Venezuelan side Inter de Barinas, where he made twenty-six league appearances and scored four goals. Following his stint there, he signed for Venezuelan side Academia Puerto Cabello in 2024, where he made nineteen league appearances and scored zero goals. One year later, he signed for Venezuelan side Caracas FC.
