= Eduardo Lima =

Eduardo Lima can refer to:

- Eduardo Lima (Brazilian footballer)
- Eduardo Lima (Venezuelan footballer)
