= Luis Forero =

Venezuelan footballer (born 2002)

Personal information
- Full name: Luis Alejandro Forero Castillo
- Date of birth: 17 February 2002 (age 24)
- Place of birth: Barinas, Venezuela
- Height: 1.80 m (5 ft 11 in)
- Position: Goalkeeper

Team information
- Current team: Inter de Barinas
- Number: 22

Youth career
- Zamora

Senior career*
Years	Team	Apps	(Gls)
2019	Zamora	0	(0)
2020–2021	Yaracuyanos	1	(0)
2022–	Inter de Barinas	0	(0)
- * Club domestic league appearances and goals as of 21:35, 28 December 2020 (UTC)

Luis Alejandro Forero Castillo (born 17 February 2002) is a Venezuelan footballer who plays as a goalkeeper for Venezuelan Primera División side Inter de Barinas.

== Career ==
=== Club career ===
Forero is a product of Zamora. He sat on the bench for two games in the Venezuelan Primera División team of Zamora in March 2019, but never got his official debut.

In 2020, he moved to Yaracuyanos. 17-year old Forero got his official debut for the club on 8 February 2020 against Gran Valencia Maracay in the Primera División.

In January 2022, Forero moved to fellow league club Hermanos Colmenarez.
