= Maikol Vivas =

Venezuelan footballer (born 1990)

Personal information
- Full name: Maikol Duvan Vivas Ramírez
- Date of birth: 28 June 1990 (age 36)
- Place of birth: Venezuela
- Position: Left-back

Team information
- Current team: Ureña
- Number: 26

Senior career*
Years	Team	Apps	(Gls)
2015–2016	Ureña	16	(0)
2016	Atlético Venezuela	0	(0)
2016–	Ureña		
- * Club domestic league appearances and goals

Maikol Duvan Vivas Ramírez (born 28 June 1990) is a Venezuelan footballer who plays as a defender for Ureña F.C.

== Personal life ==
In 2018, Vivas was kidnapped in Ureña and taken to the Colombian border. He was rescued shortly thereafter.
