= Jesús Briceño =

Venezuelan footballer (born 1998)

Personal information
- Full name: Jesús David Briceño Mendoza
- Date of birth: 26 June 1998 (age 28)
- Place of birth: Caracas, Venezuela
- Height: 1.78 m (5 ft 10 in)
- Position: Goalkeeper

Youth career
- Atlético Venezuela

Senior career*
Years	Team	Apps	(Gls)
2016–2021	Atlético Venezuela	37	(0)
2022	Deportivo La Guaira	1	(0)
- * Club domestic league appearances and goals as of 20:44, 12 December 2022 (UTC)

Jesús David Briceño Mendoza (born 26 June 1998) is a Venezuelan footballer who plays as a goalkeeper.

== Career ==
=== Club career ===
In the 2016, Briceño sat on the bench nine times for the clubs first team. 18-year old Briceño got his official debut on 25 February 2017 against Deportivo La Guaira in the Venezuelan Primera División. He made a total of 24 league appearances in the league. At the end of the year, Briceño signed a new deal until the end of 2019. In the 2018 season, however, he made no official appearances for the first team, while he only made one appearance in the following 2019 season. He left Atlético Venezuela at the end of 2021, having made a total of 37 league appearances for the club.

Ahead of the 2022 season, Briceño joined fellow league club Deportivo La Guaira.
