= Eder Mancilla =

Venezuelan football manager

Personal information
- Full name: Eder Alberto Mancilla Mora
- Date of birth: 17 May 1986 (age 40)
- Place of birth: San Cristóbal, Venezuela

Managerial career
- Years: Team
- 2009–2012: Lotería del Táchira (assistant)
- 2012–2013: Margarita (assistant)
- 2013–2015: Margarita
- 2015: UD Lara
- 2016: Carabobo (assistant)
- 2017–2018: Mineros (assistant)
- 2019–2021: Deportivo Táchira (assistant)
- 2022: Deportes Antofagasta (assistant)
- 2022: Deportivo Lara

Eder Alberto Mancilla Mora (born 17 May 1986) is a Venezuelan football manager.

== Career ==
Born in San Cristóbal, Táchira, Mancilla started his career as an assistant manager of Lotería del Táchira and Margarita, before being named manager of the latter in 2013. In March 2015, he was sacked by the club.

On 4 September 2015, Mancilla was named manager of Tercera División side UD Lara. The following April, he joined Juan Domingo Tolisano's staff at Carabobo, as an assistant manager.

Mancilla followed Tolisano to Mineros de Guayana, Deportivo Táchira and Chilean side Deportes Antofagasta, always as his assistant. On 28 March 2022, he was named manager of Primera División side Deportivo Lara, after Jorge Durán resigned.

Mancilla's first match in charge of the Rojinegro occurred on 31 March 2022, a 0–2 loss against former side Táchira. On 14 July, he resigned.
