= Jeremy Nowak =

Venezuelan football manager

Personal information
- Full name: Jeremy Alexander Nowak Bolívar
- Date of birth: 25 March 1985 (age 41)
- Place of birth: Valencia, Venezuela

Managerial career
- Years: Team
- 2015–2016: Tucanes de Amazonas (assistant)
- 2017–2018: Academia Puerto Cabello
- 2021: Academia Puerto Cabello (interim)

Jeremy Alexander Nowak Bolívar (born 25 March 1985) is a Venezuelan football manager.

== Career ==
Born in Valencia, Carabobo, Nowak worked as a youth coach before becoming an assistant at Tucanes de Amazonas in 2015. On 7 September 2017, he was named manager of Segunda División side Academia Puerto Cabello, and led the side to their first-ever promotion to the Primera División.

Nowak left Academia on 29 May 2018, being subsequently replaced by Pedro Depablos. He returned to the club on 4 November 2021, being named interim manager until the end of the season, as a replacement of sacked Martín Carrillo.
