= Julio Doldán =

Paraguayan footballer

Personal information
- Full name: Julio Sebastián Doldán Zacarías
- Date of birth: 15 October 1993 (age 33)
- Place of birth: Asunción, Paraguay
- Height: 1.85 m (6 ft 1 in)
- Position: Striker

Team information
- Current team: Irapuato
- Number: 2

Youth career
- Independiente FBC
- Garden Club
- 2007–2013: General Díaz

Senior career*
Years	Team	Apps	(Gls)
2013–2019	General Díaz	112	(19)
2019	→ Coquimbo Unido (loan)	4	(1)
2020	UAT	5	(3)
2020	Tlaxcala	14	(2)
2021–2022	12 de Octubre	48	(5)
2023	Sportivo Ameliano	9	(1)
2023	Guaireña	2	(0)
2024	Nacional Asunción	2	(0)
2024	Inter de Barinas	12	(1)
2025	Independiente FBC	15	(4)
2025–	Irapuato	12	(4)
- * Club domestic league appearances and goals as of 1 December 2025

Julio Sebastián Doldán Zacarías (born 15 October 1993) is a Paraguayan footballer who plays as a striker for Liga de Expansión MX club Irapuato.

== Club career ==
Doldán was with Independiente FBC and Garden Club before joining the General Díaz youth ranks. He made his professional debut with General Díaz and was sent on loan to Chilean Primera División club Coquimbo Unido in 2019 on a one-year deal with an option to buy.

In 2020, Doldán moved to Mexico and played for UAT and Tlaxcala in the Ascenso MX and the Liga de Expansión MX, respectively.

Back to his homeland, Doldán played for 12 de Octubre, Sportivo Ameliano, Guaireña and Nacional until 2024.

In the second half of 2024, Doldán joined Venezuelan club Inter de Barinas.

In 2025, Doldán played for Independiente FBC in the Paraguayan División Intermedia. He switched to Mexican club Irapuato in September of the same year.

== Personal life ==
He is the son of the football manager and former footballer Julio Javier Doldán and the younger brother of Diego Doldán.
