= Rafael Sangiovani =

Argentine footballer

Personal information
- Date of birth: 31 March 1998 (age 28)
- Place of birth: Arteaga, Argentina
- Height: 1.68 m (5 ft 6 in)
- Position: Midfielder

Team information
- Current team: Metropolitanos
- Number: 5

Youth career
- Rosario Central

Senior career*
Years	Team	Apps	(Gls)
2020–2022	Rosario Central	20	(0)
2022	→ Villa Dálmine (loan)	25	(1)
2023	Independiente Rivadavia	6	(0)
2024	Brown de Adrogué	54	(1)
2025	Zamora	12	(0)
2025	Anzoategui	8	(0)
2026–	Metropolitanos	5	(0)
- * Club domestic league appearances and goals as of 11 March 2026

Rafael Sangiovani (born 31 March 1998) is an Argentine professional footballer who plays as a midfielder for Venezuelan club Metropolitanos.

== Career ==
Sangiovani is a product of the Rosario Central youth system. After signing his first professional contract in 2019, he was promoted into the first-team squad in late-2020 under manager Kily González. Sangiovani made his senior debut in a 1–1 draw away from home against Banfield on 4 December 2020, featuring for eighty minutes before being replaced by Diego Zabala due to injury. In January 2022, Sangiovani joined Primera Nacional club Villa Dálmine on a one-year loan deal.

== Career statistics ==
As of 22 December 2020.

Appearances and goals by club, season and competition
Club	Season	League			Cup		League Cup		Continental		Other		Total	
Club	Season	Division	Apps	Goals	Apps	Goals	Apps	Goals	Apps	Goals	Apps	Goals	Apps	Goals
Rosario Central	2020–21 (Note: Soccerway counts Copa de la Liga Profesional appearances as league appearances.)	Primera División	3	0	0	0	0	0	—		0	0	3	0
Career total			3	0	0	0	0	0	—		0	0	3	0
