= Moisés Acuña =

Venezuelan footballer (born 1996)

Personal information
- Full name: Moisés Manuel Acuña Morales
- Date of birth: 23 July 1996 (age 30)
- Place of birth: Maturín, Venezuela
- Height: 1.76 m (5 ft 9 in)
- Position: Center-back

Team information
- Current team: Portuguesa
- Number: 33

Senior career*
Years	Team	Apps	(Gls)
2015–2019	Caracas F.C.	34	(1)
2019–2022	Aragua F.C.	68	(0)
2023–2024	Deportivo La Guaira	32	(2)
2024	Inter de Barinas	7	(0)
2025	Nacional Potosí	4	(0)
2026–	Portuguesa	2	(1)
- * Club domestic league appearances and goals as of 11 March 2026

Moisés Manuel Acuña Morales (born 23 July 1996) is a Venezuelan footballer who plays as a defender for Portuguesa in the Venezuelan Primera División.

== Career ==
=== Caracas ===
Acuña began his senior career with Caracas, making his Venezuelan Primera División debut on 4 October 2015 in a 3–0 victory over Estudiantes de Mérida. Following the 2018 season, his contract was terminated by the club.
