= Rafael Acosta (Venezuelan footballer) =

Venezuelan footballer (born 1989)

Personal information
- Full name: Rafael Eduardo Acosta Cammarota
- Date of birth: 13 February 1989 (age 37)
- Place of birth: Caracas, Venezuela
- Height: 1.82 m (6 ft 0 in)
- Position: Midfielder

Team information
- Current team: Metropolitanos
- Number: 20

Youth career
- 2005–2008: Cagliari

Senior career*
Years	Team	Apps	(Gls)
2008–2018	Cagliari	0	(0)
2010	→ Diagoras (loan)	9	(1)
2010–2011	→ Murcia Imperial	13	(1)
2011–2016	→ Mineros de Guayana (loan)	137	(14)
2017	→ Olimpia (loan)	3	(0)
2017–2018	→ Independiente FBC (loan)	10	(1)
2018–2019	Alki Oroklini	28	(2)
2019–2020	Olympiakos Nicosia	17	(1)
2021	Politehnica Iași	8	(0)
2021–2022	Alki Oroklini	7	(0)
2022–2023	Omonia Aradippou	11	(2)
2024	Puerto Cabello	0	(0)
2026–	Metropolitanos	3	(0)

International career^{‡}
2008–2009	Venezuela U20	10	(1)
2008–2016	Venezuela	13	(0)
- * Club domestic league appearances and goals as of 11 March 2026 ‡ National team caps and goals as of 17 March 2018

Rafael Eduardo Acosta Cammarota (born 13 February 1989) is a Venezuelan footballer who plays for Metropolitanos. His main position is central midfielder, but he can play on the right wing.

== Club career ==
Acosta started his professional career at Cagliari where he made his first team debut in a Coppa Italia match on 12 December 2007 against Sampdoria, which Cagliari won 1–0 to. He replaced Enrico Cotza at half-time. In January 2010, he was loaned to Greek second division side Diagoras until the end of the 2009–10 season.

== International stats ==
Venezuela national team
Year	Apps	Goals
2008	1	0
2009	5	0
2010	0	0
2011	0	0
2012	0	0
2013	0	0
2014	4	0
2015	2	0
2016	1	0
Total	13	0

== Honours ==
ACCD Mineros de Guayana

- Copa Venezuela: 2011
