= Heber García =

Venezuelan footballer (born 1997)

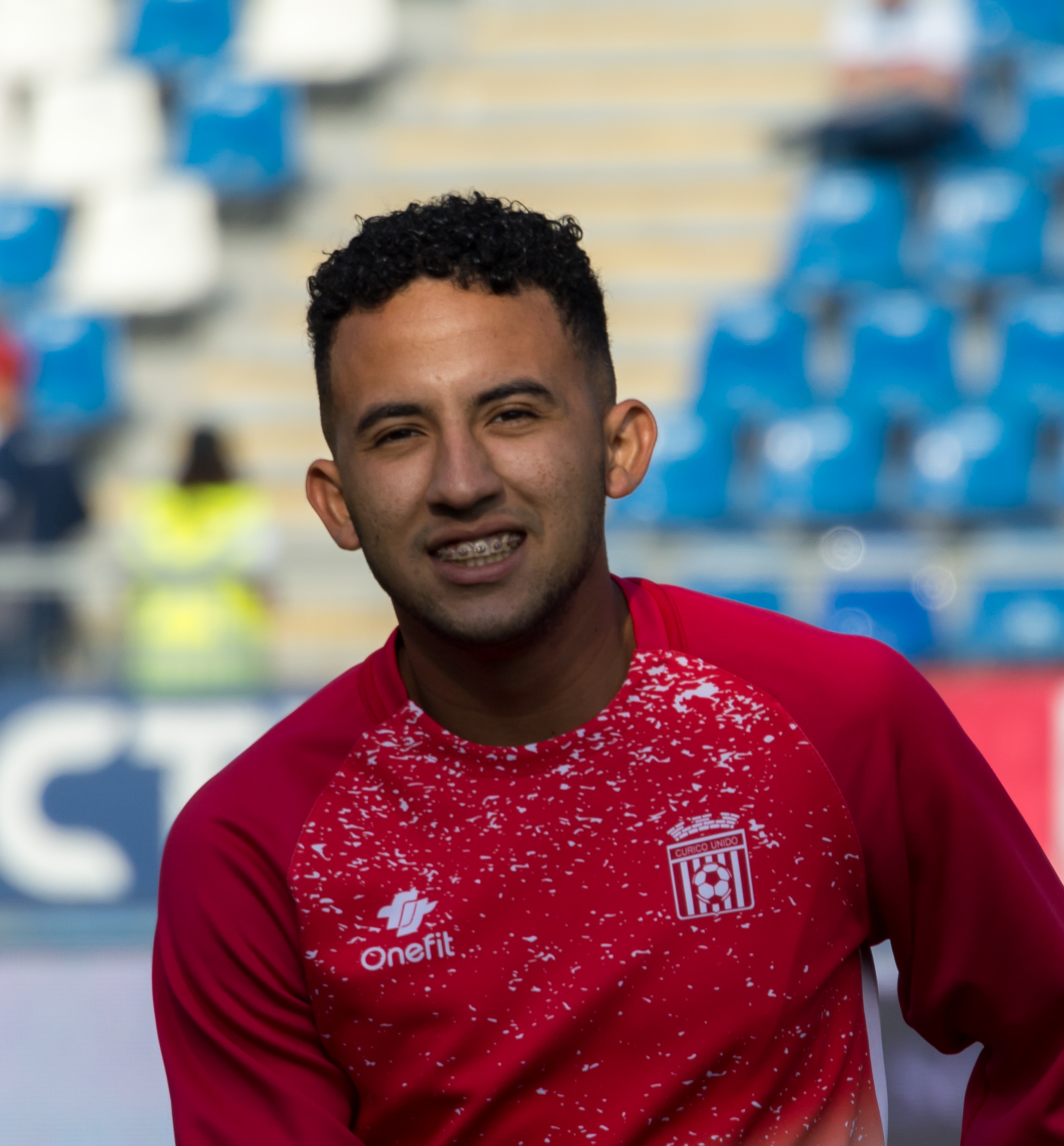
- García with Curicó Unido in 2019

Personal information
- Full name: Heber Daniel García Torrealba
- Date of birth: 27 March 1997 (age 29)
- Place of birth: San Felipe, Venezuela
- Height: 1.69 m (5 ft 6 1/2 in)
- Position: Midfielder

Team information
- Current team: Portuguesa
- Number: 16

Senior career*
Years	Team	Apps	(Gls)
2014–2015	Portuguesa	39	(3)
2016–2018	Deportivo La Guaira	35	(4)
2017	→ Sud América (loan)	18	(2)
2019	→ Curicó Unido (loan)	21	(5)
2020–2021	Curicó Unido	33	(3)
2022	Deportivo La Guaira	23	(1)
2023	Zamora	12	(0)
2024	Monagas	13	(1)
2025	Barquisimeto	21	(7)
2026–	Portuguesa	3	(0)

International career^{‡}
2017	Venezuela U20	3	(0)
- * Club domestic league appearances and goals as of 11 March 2026 ‡ National team caps and goals as of May 17, 2017

Heber Daniel García Torrealba (born 27 March 1997) is a Venezuelan football player who plays as midfielder for Portuguesa.

== Career ==
García started his career with Portuguesa.

In 2017, García played for Uruguayan club Sud América on loan from Deportivo La Guaira. In 2019, he moved to Chilean club Curicó Unido.

In 2024, García joined Monagas.

== Club statistics ==
As of 02:22, 10 February 2021 (UTC).

Club	Season	League		Cup		Continental		Total		
Club	Season	Apps	Goals	Apps	Goals	Apps	Goals	Apps	Goals	
Portuguesa	2014–15	22	0	0	0	0	0	22	0	
Portuguesa	2015	17	3	0	0	0	0	17	3	
Portuguesa	Total	39	3	0	0	0	0	39	3	
Deportivo La Guaira	2016	6	0	0	0	0	0	6	0	
Deportivo La Guaira	Total	6	0	0	0	0	0	6	0	
Sud América	2017	15	2	0	0	0	0	15	2	
Sud América	Total	15	2	0	0	0	0	15	2	
Curicó Unido	2019	21	5	0	0	0	0	21	5	
Curicó Unido	Curicó Unido	2020	17	1	0	0	0	0	17	1
Total	Curicó Unido	38	6	0	0	0	0	38	6	
Career totals		98	11	0	0	0	0	98	11	

== Honours ==
=== International ===
Venezuela U-20

- FIFA U-20 World Cup: Runner-up 2017
- South American Youth Football Championship: Third Place 2017
