= Arles Flores =

Venezuelan footballer (born 1991)

Personal information
- Full name: Arles Eduardo Flores Crespo
- Date of birth: 12 April 1991 (age 35)
- Place of birth: Barinas, Venezuela
- Height: 1.75 m (5 ft 9 in)
- Position: Midfielder

Team information
- Current team: Zamora
- Number: 8

Senior career*
Years	Team	Apps	(Gls)
2012–2016	Zamora	171	(7)
2016–2023	Deportivo La Guaira	221	(10)
2024–	Zamora	10	(0)

International career^{‡}
2016–	Venezuela	4	(0)
- * Club domestic league appearances and goals as of 30 September 2016 ‡ National team caps and goals as of 10 October 2016

Arles Eduardo Flores Crespo (born April 12, 1991) is a Venezuelan footballer who plays for Venezuelan club Zamora as a midfielder.

== Club career ==
Flores began his international career in 2012, on the Venezuelan Club Zamora. In 2016, he joined the club Deportivo La Guaira.

== International career ==
Flores made his debut on the Venezuela national football team on February 3, 2016, in a FIFA World Cup qualifier.
