= Jair Díaz (football manager) =

Venezuelan footballer

Personal information
- Full name: Jair José Díaz Villegas
- Date of birth: 3 July 1980 (age 46)
- Place of birth: Caracas, Venezuela

Managerial career
- Years: Team
- 2003–2009: Colegio Los Arcos
- 2010–2015: Atlético Venezuela (youth)
- 2015–2019: Venezuela U17 (assistant)
- 2019–2020: Venezuela U20 (assistant)
- 2020–2021: Atlético Venezuela
- 2021: Atlético Venezuela (assistant)

Jair José Díaz Villegas (born 3 July 1980) is a Venezuelan football manager.

== Career ==
Born in Caracas, Díaz began his career at Colegio Los Arcos in 2003. In 2010, he joined Atlético Venezuela's youth setup, and worked as manager of the under-20 squad.

In September 2015, Díaz was named José Hernández's assistant at the Venezuela under-17 national team. In 2019, he also followed Hernández to the under-20s.

On 1 November 2020, Díaz returned to Atlético Venezuela, now named manager of the first team in the Primera División.
