= Diosbert Rivero =

Venezuelan footballer (born 2000)

Personal information
- Full name: Diosbert Alexander Rivero Cantillo
- Date of birth: 3 May 2000 (age 26)
- Place of birth: Guanare, Venezuela
- Height: 1.92 m (6 ft 4 in)
- Position: Forward

Team information
- Current team: Unión Sur Yaiza

Youth career
- Llaneros de Guanare

Senior career*
Years	Team	Apps	(Gls)
2017–2018	Llaneros de Guanare	17	(4)
2019	Extremadura B	13	(3)
2019	Extremadura	2	(0)
2019–2020	Burgos	6	(1)
2020–2021	Burgos B	1	(0)
2021	→ La Unión Atlético (loan)	3	(0)
2021–2022	Calamonte	23	(3)
2022–2024	Calamonte	34	(8)
2024–2025	Villafranca	30	(8)
2025–	Unión Sur Yaiza	2	(0)

International career^{‡}
2018	Venezuela U20	7	(0)
- * Club domestic league appearances and goals as of 14 September 2025 ‡ National team caps and goals as of 18 November 2018

Diosbert Alexander Rivero Cantillo (born 3 May 2000) is a Venezuelan footballer who plays for Spanish Tercera Federación club Unión Sur Yaiza as a forward.

== Club career ==
Born in Guanare, Rivero was a Llaneros de Guanare youth graduate. He started to appear with the first team during the 2017 season, with the club in the second division, and scored three league goals during his two-year spell at the main squad, helping in their promotion in 2018.

In January 2019, Rivero moved abroad and joined Spanish club Extremadura UD, being initially assigned to the reserves in Tercera División. He made his professional debut on 4 June, coming on as a late substitute for Kike Márquez in a 1–0 away win against Cádiz CF in the Segunda División championship.

On 15 July 2019, Rivero signed a four-year contract with Segunda División B side Burgos CF.

== Honours ==
Llaneros de Guanare

- Venezuelan Segunda División: 2018
