= José Hernández (footballer, born 1961) =

Venezuelan Football Coach

Personal information
- Full name: José Baudilio Hernández Maceda
- Date of birth: 16 December 1961 (age 64)
- Place of birth: Maracaibo, Venezuela

Team information
- Current team: Atlético Venezuela (manager)

Senior career*
Years	Team	Apps	(Gls)
- Centro Atlético
- Marítimo de Venezuela
- Universidad Central

Managerial career
- 1985–1995: San Agustín El Paraíso (youth)
- 1995–2003: Caracas (youth)
- 2003–2007: Caracas B
- 2007–2009: Minervén
- 2009: Deportivo Anzoátegui
- 2009–2010: Mineros
- 2011–2015: Atlético Venezuela
- 2015–2019: Venezuela U17
- 2019–2021: Venezuela U20
- 2021–: Atlético Venezuela
- * Club domestic league appearances and goals

José Baudilio Hernández Maceda (born 16 December 1961) is a Venezuelan football manager and former player. He is the current manager of Atlético Venezuela.

== Career ==
Born in Caracas, Hernández played as a senior for Centro Atlético, Marítimo de Venezuela and Universidad Central de Venezuela before retiring due to injuries. He began his managerial career in 1985, while in charge of C.S. Colegio San Agustín El Paraíso's youth categories.

Hernández joined Caracas in 1995, being initially a manager of the youth sides before taking over the B-team in 2003. In 2007, he was appointed manager of Primera División side Minervén.

Hernández left Minervén in 2009, and had a short period in charge of Deportivo Anzoátegui before being appointed at the helm of Mineros. He left the latter in 2010, being appointed manager of Atlético Venezuela in the following year.

Hernández joined the Venezuelan Football Federation in 2015, as manager of the under-17 national team. On 16 August 2019, he was named at the helm of the under-20 side.

In October 2021, Hernández returned to Atlético Venezuela, replacing Jair Díaz.

== Personal life ==
Hernández's father Nerio Hernández was also a manager. His son Igor is also a footballer.
