= Rafael Arace =

Venezuelan footballer (born 1995)

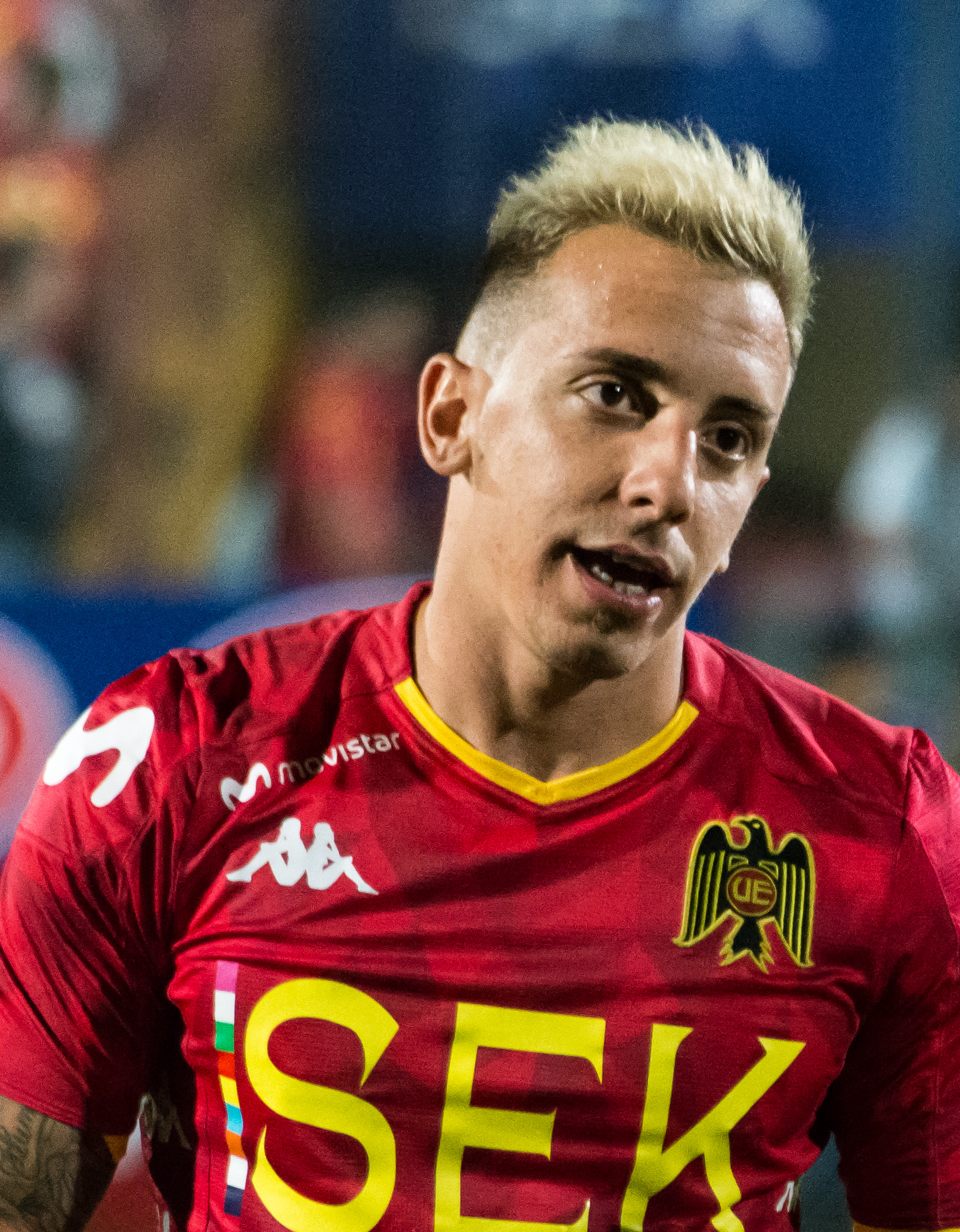
- Arace with Unión Española in 2020

Personal information
- Full name: Rafael Daniel Arace Gargaro
- Date of birth: 22 May 1995 (age 31)
- Place of birth: Caracas, Venezuela
- Height: 1.73 m (5 ft 8 in)
- Positions: Left midfielder; winger

Team information
- Current team: Monagas

Senior career*
| Years | Team | Apps | (Gls) |
| 2013–2017 | Deportivo Petare | 89 | (4) |
| 2017–2020 | Caracas | 47 | (1) |
| 2019 | → Aragua (loan) | 24 | (6) |
| 2019–2020 | → Unión Española (loan) | 11 | (1) |
| 2020–2021 | Coquimbo Unido | 11 | (0) |
| 2021 | Aragua | 30 | (7) |
| 2022 | Deportivo Táchira | 18 | (2) |
| 2023–2024 | Deportivo La Guaira | 62 | (14) |
| 2025 | Cobreloa | 1 | (0) |
| 2025 | Academia Puerto Cabello | 7 | (0) |
| 2026 | Deportivo La Guaira | 12 | (0) |
| 2026- | Monagas | 5 | (0) |
- * Club domestic league appearances and goals as of 10 March 2026

Rafael Daniel Arace Gargaro (born 22 May 1995) is a Venezuelan footballer who plays as a midfielder for Monagas.

== Career ==
Besides Venezuela, Arace played in Chile between 2019 and 2021 for Unión Española and Coquimbo Unido in the top level.

In January 2025, Arace returned to Chile and joined Cobreloa in the Primera B. He left them on 6 May of the same year.
