= Junior Lennin Díaz =

Venezuelan football manager (born 1975)

Personal information
- Full name: Junior Lennin Díaz Almeida
- Date of birth: 1 May 1977 (age 49)
- Place of birth: Mérida, Venezuela
- Height: 1.76 m (5 ft 9 in)
- Position: Left back

Senior career*
| Years | Team | Apps | (Gls) |
| 1997–2002 | Estudiantes de Mérida | | |
| 2002–2004 | Maracaibo | | |
| 2004–2005 | Estudiantes de Mérida | | |
| 2006 | Italmaracaibo | 11 | (0) |
| 2006–2007 | Monagas | 25 | (0) |
| 2007–2008 | Llaneros | 11 | (0) |

Managerial career
- 2018: Portuguesa (assistant)
- 2019: Atlético El Vigía (assistant)
- 2021: Trujillanos
- 2022: ULA
- * Club domestic league appearances and goals

Junior Lennin Díaz Almeida (born 1 July 1975) is a Venezuelan football manager and former player who played as a left back.

== Career ==
Born in Mérida, Díaz played for Estudiantes de Mérida, Unión Atlético Maracaibo, Deportivo Italmaracaibo, Monagas and Llaneros de Guanare. In 2008, after suffering a severe knee injury and being released by Llaneros, he retired.

Díaz subsequently worked for the Mérida branch of the Colegio Nacional de Entrenadores de Fútbol (National School of Football Managers) and was also an assistant manager at Portuguesa and Atlético El Vigía. On 29 March 2021, he was appointed manager of Trujillanos, but resigned on 17 May.
