= Adolfo Monsalve =

Venezuelan football manager

Personal information
- Full name: Adolfo Enrique Monsalve Parra
- Date of birth: 11 May 1991 (age 35)
- Place of birth: San Cristóbal, Venezuela

Managerial career
- Years: Team
- 2013–2016: Deportivo Táchira (youth)
- 2017: Deportivo Táchira (assistant)
- 2017: Deportivo Táchira (interim)
- 2018: Universidad Católica del Ecuador (youth)
- 2018: Norte América (youth)
- 2018–2019: Istra 1961 (assistant)
- 2019–2020: Gafanha
- 2021: Ureña
- 2022: Deportivo Táchira (reserves)
- 2022: Zulia
- 2023: Ureña
- 2024: Águilas Doradas (assistant)
- 2025: Zamora

Adolfo Enrique Monsalve Parra (born 11 January 1982) is a Venezuelan football manager and former player.

== Career ==
Born in San Cristóbal, Monsalve worked as a youth coach for Deportivo Táchira before being named an assistant of the side for the 2017 season. In October of that year, he was an interim for one match after the departure of manager Santiago Escobar and new coach Francesco Stifano was unavailable.

Monsalve left Táchira on 29 November 2017, and subsequently joined Universidad Católica del Ecuador as an under-18 coach. He left the latter in May 2018 after assaulting a referee, and subsequently worked at Norte América's youth categories.

In January 2019, Monsalve moved to Croatia and became an assistant at NK Istra 1961. He left on 16 July, and switched teams and countries again after being named manager of G.D. Gafanha in Portugal.

Monsalve left Gafanha in September 2020, and subsequently returned to his home country after being appointed in charge of Ureña on 11 February 2021. After leaving the side in November, he returned to Táchira on 1 March 2022, after being named at the helm of the reserves.

On 15 August 2022, Monsalve replaced Francisco Perlo as Zulia manager. He returned to Ureña for the 2023 season, and won the Segunda División with the side before resigning on 14 December of that year.

On 6 January 2025, after spending the previous year as an assistant of Colombian side Águilas Doradas, Monsalve returned to managerial duties after taking over Zamora, but left the club by mutual consent less than two months later.

== Honours ==
Ureña

- Venezuelan Segunda División: 2023
