= Jesús Lugo =

Venezuelan footballer (born 1991)

Jesus Lugo
Personal information
- Full name: Jesús Alberto Lugo Limpio
- Date of birth: 14 September 1991 (age 35)
- Place of birth: Villa de Cura, Venezuela
- Height: 1.78 m (5 ft 10 in)
- Position: Attacking midfielder

Team information
- Current team: Zulia
- Number: 7

Senior career*
Years	Team	Apps	(Gls)
2009–2017	Aragua	219	(41)
2018–2019	Deportivo La Guaira	29	(1)
2019	→ Aragua (loan)	15	(2)
2020–	Zulia	4	(0)

International career
2011	Venezuela U20	3	(0)
2011–	Venezuela	3	(0)
- * Club domestic league appearances and goals as of 18:56, 3 November 2020 (UTC)

Jesús Alberto Lugo Limpio is a Venezuelan footballer who plays as an attacking midfielder for Zulia F.C. and can play with either foot.

== Club career ==
=== Aragua ===
Lugo was with Aragua FC since the 2008–09 season. In the 2009–10 season, he won the Youth of the Year award from the First Division of Venezuela. His first ever goal for Aragua FC came against Monagas in a 2–2 draw on 16 August 2009, a week later he bagged the winning goal against Mineros de Guayana (1–0), he then got both goals in a 2–1 win over Atlético El Vigía on 12 September 2009. On 8 November 2009 he scored an injury time (92nd minute) equaliser against Estudiantes de Mérida. Lugo scored in a 3–1 away loss to Trujillanos FC on 17 January 2010, he scored in the 3rd minute in a 3–2 away win against Real Esppor on 25 April 2010. He scored a 79th-minute winner (2–1) against Zamora away from home on 11 August 2010, that made it 8 goals in 7 games for the attacking midfielder, drawing a blank in his next two games he went on to score against Caroní in a 2–0 win on 12 September 2010, and again on 3 October 2010 against Anzoátegui (4–2 away win). Lugo scored his first goal of the 2011–12 season against Zulia in a 3–1 away win on 11 February 2012. His second of the season came against Zamora in a 2–1 home win on 10 March 2012. He scored his third against Mineros de Guayana in a 2–2 draw away from home on 1 April 2012, and his fourth came against Trujillanos on 6 May 2012 in a 2–1 defeat, also away.

== International career ==
On 7 August 2011, Lugo made his full debut starting and playing for 63 minutes against El Salvador losing the match 2–1, on 11 August 2011 he came on in the 73rd minute against Honduras, losing 2–0.

== Career statistics ==
=== Club ===
As of 23 May 2012

Club	Season	League		Cup		Continental		Total	
Club	Season	Apps	Goals	Apps	Goals	Apps	Goals	Apps	Goals
Aragua FC	2009–10	6	7	0	0	–		6	7
Aragua FC	2010–11	27	5	0	0	–		27	5
Aragua FC	2011–12	29	4	0	0	–		29	4
Total		62	16	0	0	–		62	16

=== International ===
Venezuela national team
Year	Apps	Goals
2011	2	0
2012		
Total	2	0
