= David Zalzman =

Venezuelan footballer (born 1996)

Personal information
- Full name: David Alejandro Zalzman Guevara
- Date of birth: March 4, 1996 (age 30)
- Place of birth: Maracay, Venezuela
- Height: 5 ft 9 in (1.75 m)
- Position: Midfielder

Team information
- Current team: Metropolitanos
- Number: 15

Youth career
- 2008–2013: Barcelona
- 2013–2014: Deportivo Anzoátegui

College career
Years	Team	Apps	(Gls)
2016–2018	Memphis Tigers	48	(6)

Senior career*
Years	Team	Apps	(Gls)
2014–2015	Deportivo Anzoátegui	17	(0)
2016	OKC Energy U23	12	(0)
2017	Des Moines Menace	7	(0)
2018	Memphis City	5	(0)
2019–2021	Deportivo Táchira	42	(0)
2022	Monagas	25	(0)
2023	Estudiantes de Merida	13	(0)
2024-	Metropolitanos	46	(3)

International career^{‡}
2013	Venezuela U17	10	(0)
- * Club domestic league appearances and goals as of 10 March 2026 ‡ National team caps and goals as of 19:11, 8 February 2019 (UTC)

David Alejandro Zalzman Guevara (born March 4, 1996) is a Venezuelan footballer who plays as a midfielder for Metropolitanos in the Venezuelan Primera División.

== Career statistics ==
=== Club ===
As of 8 February 2019.

Club	Season	League			Cup		Continental		Other		Total	
Club	Season	Division	Apps	Goals	Apps	Goals	Apps	Goals	Apps	Goals	Apps	Goals
Deportivo Anzoátegui	2014–15	Venezuelan Primera División	17	0	0	0	2 (Note: Appearances in the Copa Sudamericana)	0	0	0	19	0
OKC Energy U23	2016	PDL	12	0	0	0	–		0	0	12	0
Des Moines Menace	2017	PDL	7	0	0	0	–		0	0	7	0
Memphis City	2018	PDL	5	0	0	0	–		0	0	5	0
Career total			41	0	0	0	2	0	0	0	43	0
