= Elías Emmons =

Venezuelan football manager

Personal information
- Full name: Elías Jarol Rafael Emmons Cova
- Date of birth: 11 December 1981 (age 44)
- Place of birth: Maturín, Venezuela

Team information
- Current team: Mineros (manager)

Managerial career
- Years: Team
- 2007: Minervén (youth)
- 2013–2014: Estudiantes de Caroní (assistant)
- 2014: Estudiantes de Caroní (interim)
- 2014–2015: Estudiantes de Caroní
- 2015–2017: LALA (assistant)
- 2018: Margarita (assistant)
- 2018: Chicó de Guayana (assistant)
- 2019: Mineros (assistant)
- 2019–2021: Chicó de Guayana (youth)
- 2021: LALA
- 2021: LALA
- 2022–2023: Mineros (assistant)
- 2022: Mineros (interim)
- 2025: Mineros (youth)
- 2025–: Mineros

Elías Jarol Rafael Emmons Cova (born 11 December 1981) is a Venezuelan football manager. He is the current manager of Mineros.

== Career ==
Emmons was initially an assistant of Del Valle Rojas at Segunda División side Estudiantes de Caroní, but became an interim for the latter stages of the 2013–14 season, where his team could not avoid relegation to the Tercera División.

Emmons was Estudiantes' manager for the 2014–15 campaign, but later returned to his role as Rojas' assistant after the club changed their name to LALA FC. After leaving LALA, he was also Horacio Matuszyczk's assistant at Mineros de Guayana.

After leaving Mineros, Emmons worked at Chicó de Guayana's under-20 team. For the 2021 campaign, he returned to LALA as manager the club in the Primera División.
