= Facundo Moreira =

Uruguayan football player (born 1989)

Personal information
- Full name: Facundo Maximiliano Moreira Burgos
- Date of birth: 27 February 1989 (age 37)
- Place of birth: Montevideo, Uruguay
- Height: 1.90 m (6 ft 3 in)
- Position: Midfielder

Senior career*
Years	Team	Apps	(Gls)
2010–2013	Miramar Misiones	14	(0)
2013–2014	Rentistas	16	(0)
2014–2017	Boston River	30	(6)
2015–2016	→ El Tanque Sisley (loan)	22	(5)
2016–2017	→ Cerro (loan)	16	(1)
2017–2018	Metropolitanos	15	(0)
2018–2019	Caracas	32	(0)
2019	Progreso	9	(0)
2019	Trujillanos	13	(0)
2020	Cerro	18	(0)
2021	Deportivo Coopsol	4	(0)
2021–2022	Metropolitanos	41	(0)
2023–2024	Academia Cantolao	50	(1)
- * Club domestic league appearances and goals

Facundo Maximiliano Moreira Burgos (born 27 February 1989) is a Uruguayan former professional footballer who played as a midfielder.
