= Cocodrilos Sports Park =

Stadium in Caracas, Venezuela

- Interactive map of Cocodrilos Sports Park
- Location: Caracas, Venezuela
- Coordinates: 10°28′27.06″N 66°56′20.63″W
- Capacity: 3,500
- Surface: artificial grass

Construction
- Opened: July 20, 2005

Tenant
- Caracas Fútbol Club

Cocodrilos Sports Park is a multi-use stadium in Caracas, Venezuela. It is currently used mostly for football matches and is the part-time home stadium of Caracas Fútbol Club along with Estadio Brígido Iriarte. The stadium holds 3,500 people.
