= Eduardo Lima (Venezuelan footballer) =

Venezuelan footballer (born 1992)

Personal information
- Full name: Eduardo Luis Lima Prado
- Date of birth: 9 October 1992 (age 34)
- Place of birth: Maturín, Venezuela
- Height: 1.82 m (5 ft 11 1/2 in)
- Position: Goalkeeper

Team information
- Current team: Monagas

Youth career
- 2010–2011: Monagas

Senior career*
Years	Team	Apps	(Gls)
2010–2013	Monagas	91	(0)
2013–2015	Deportivo Petare	26	(0)
2015–2018	Portuguesa	88	(0)
2018–2021	Atlético Venezuela	71	(0)
2023—2025	Deportivo La Guaira	10	(0)
2025–	Monagas	4	(0)

International career^{‡}
2011	Venezuela U20	4	(0)
- * Club domestic league appearances and goals as of October 9, 2011 ‡ National team caps and goals as of October 9, 2011

Eduardo Luis Lima Prado (born 9 October 1992) is a Venezuelan footballer who currently plays for Monagas as a goalkeeper. He has been capped by Venezuela U20.
