= Edson Rodríguez =

Venezuelan football manager (born 1970)

Personal information
- Full name: Edson José Rodríguez Quilarque
- Date of birth: 24 July 1970 (age 56)
- Place of birth: Caracas, Venezuela
- Height: 1.76 m (5 ft 9 in)
- Position: Defender

Youth career
- Marítimo de Venezuela

Senior career*
Years	Team	Apps	(Gls)
1987–1994	Marítimo de Venezuela		
1994–1995	Minervén		
1995–1998	Deportivo Italia		
2003	Marítimo de Margarita		
2004	Unión Lara		
2005–2006	Deportivo Galicia		
2007–2009	Centro Ítalo		
2010	Atlético Venezuela		

International career
1993–1996	Venezuela	21	(1)

Managerial career
- 2010: Atlético Venezuela (player-manager)
- 2010: Atlético Venezuela
- 2012–2013: Deportivo Petare (youth)
- 2013: Deportivo Petare
- 2015–2016: Universidad Central
- 2017–2019: Estudiantes de Caracas (youth)
- 2019–2020: Estudiantes de Caracas
- 2021–2022: Aragua
- 2022–2023: Universidad Central
- * Club domestic league appearances and goals

Edson José Rodríguez Quilarque (born 24 July 1970) is a Venezuelan football manager and former player who played as a defender.

During his playing career, Rodríguez notably represented Marítimo de Venezuela, winning four Venezuelan Primera División titles with the club. He also played for the Venezuela national team on 21 occasions, scoring once, and represented the nation in the 1993 and 1995 Copa América editions.

== Career statistics ==
=== International ===
Appearances and goals by national team and year
National team	Year	Apps	Goals
Venezuela	1993	13	0
Venezuela	1994	1	1
Venezuela	1995	4	0
Venezuela	1996	3	0
Total		21	1

Scores and results list Venezuela's goal tally first, score column indicates score after each Rodríguez goal.

List of international goals scored by Edson Rodríguez
No.	Date	Venue	Opponent	Score	Result	Competition
1	28 January 1994	Estadio Agustín Tovar, Barinas, Venezuela	Colombia	1–1	1–2	Friendly
