= Jorge Antonio Durán =

Venezuelan football manager

Jorge Durán
Personal information
- Full name: Jorge Antonio Durán Márquez
- Date of birth: 12 April 1969 (age 57)
- Place of birth: Mérida, Venezuela

Managerial career
- Years: Team
- 2016: Mineros
- 2020: Mineros (assistant)
- 2021: Deportivo Lara (assistant)
- 2021: Deportivo Lara (interim)
- 2022: Deportivo Lara
- 2022: Mineros

Jorge Antonio Durán Márquez (born 12 April 1969) is a Venezuelan football manager.

== Career ==
Born in Mérida, Durán began his career as a fitness coach, and worked with Richard Páez for several years. On 5 August 2016, he was named manager of Primera División side Mineros de Guayana, replacing Chuy Vera.

Durán subsequently rejoined Páez's staff, being a fitness coach at Deportivo Cuenca and an assistant manager back at Mineros in 2020. He was also an assistant at Deportivo Lara during the 2021 season, before taking over as an interim as manager Leonardo González was coaching the Venezuela national team.

On 29 December 2021, Durán was permanently named manager of Deportivo Lara, after González resigned. He left on a mutual agreement the following 27 March, after just one win in five league matches, and returned to Mineros on 21 April.

On 28 August 2022, Durán left Mineros.
