= Luis Alberto Pacheco =

Venezuelan football manager

Luis Pacheco
Personal information
- Full name: Luis Alberto Pacheco Castillo
- Date of birth: 30 April 1968 (age 58)
- Place of birth: Barinas, Venezuela

Managerial career
- Years: Team
- 2014–2015: Atlético Socopó
- 2016–2022: Hermanos Colmenarez
- 2024: Inter de Barinas (assistant)

Luis Alberto Pacheco Castillo (born 30 April 1968) is a Venezuelan football manager.

== Career ==
Born in Barinas, Pacheco's first major work occurred in 2014, as he was named in charge of Segunda División side Atlético Socopó. In 2016, he took over Hermanos Colmenarez, taking them to Tercera División in the following year.

After Hermanos merged with Madeira Club de Lara and achieved promotion to the second level, Pacheco was still in charge of the club. He was again manager of the side for the 2019 and 2020 campaigns, the latter in the Primera División.

On 25 July 2022, Pacheco was sacked by Hermanos Colmenarez.
