= Carlos Rivero (footballer) =

Venezuelan footballer (born 1992)

Personal information
- Full name: Carlos Gregorio Rivero González
- Date of birth: 27 November 1992 (age 33)
- Place of birth: Valencia, Venezuela
- Position: Centre back

Team information
- Current team: Deportivo La Guaira
- Number: 4

Senior career*
| Years | Team | Apps | (Gls) |
| 2009–2011 | Carabobo | 5 | (0) |
| 2011–2013 | Deportivo Anzoátegui | 51 | (0) |
| 2013–2015 | Deportivo Tachira | 72 | (1) |
| 2015 | ACD Lara | 15 | (0) |
| 2016–2018 | Carabobo | 110 | (4) |
| 2019 | Mineros de Guayana | 30 | (1) |
| 2020–2022 | Caracas | 74 | (2) |
| 2023–2024 | Academia Puerto Cabello | 59 | (0) |
| 2025– | Deportivo La Guaira | 40 | (1) |

International career
| 2011 | Venezuela U20 | 4 | (0) |
| 2011–2012 | Venezuela | 4 | (0) |
- * Club domestic league appearances and goals as of 10 March 2026

Carlos Gregorio Rivero González (born 27 November 1992) is a Venezuelan international footballer who plays for Deportivo La Guaira as a centre back.

== Career ==
Born in Valencia, Rivero has played club football for Carabobo and Deportivo Anzoátegui.

He made his international debut for Venezuela in 2011.
