= Martín Carrillo =

Venezuelan football manager

Personal information
- Full name: Martín Simón Carrillo Simancas
- Date of birth: 26 January 1983 (age 43)
- Place of birth: Caracas, Venezuela

Managerial career
- Years: Team
- San Agustín El Paraíso (youth)
- 2012–2013: Real Esppor (youth)
- 2013: Deportivo La Guaira (assistant)
- 2014: Portuguesa (assistant)
- 2015: Tucanes de Amazonas (assistant)
- 2015–2019: Zamora (assistant)
- 2019–2020: Trujillanos
- 2020–2021: Venezuela U20
- 2021: Academia Puerto Cabello

Martín Simón Carrillo Simancas (born 26 January 1983) is a Venezuelan football manager.

== Career ==
Born in Caracas, Carrillo began his career with C.S. Colegio San Agustín El Paraíso, and later worked at Real Esppor's youth setup. In 2013, as the club was renamed to Deportivo La Guaira, he was named Francesco Stifano's assistant in the first team.

Carrillo followed Stifano to Portuguesa, Tucanes de Amazonas and Zamora, always as his assistant. On 16 June 2019, he was appointed manager of Trujillanos.

Carrillo resigned on 17 December 2020, and was named in charge of the Venezuela under-20 football team the following day. He was unable to manage a single match for the side as the 2021 South American U-20 Championship was cancelled, and returned to club duties on 28 August 2021, after being appointed at the helm of Academia Puerto Cabello.
