= Pastor Márquez =

Venezuelan football coach

Personal information
- Full name: Arcadio Pastor Márquez Castro
- Date of birth: 12 August 1977 (age 49)
- Place of birth: Colón, Venezuela

Managerial career
- Years: Team
- 2015–2016: Atlético Vega Real
- 2016–2017: Llaneros
- 2017: Atlético Furrial
- 2018: Atlético Bermejo
- 2018: Atlético Furrial
- 2019: El Salvador U23
- 2019: Libertador
- 2020: Ureña
- 2021: Yaracuy
- 2021: Mineros
- 2022: Titanes
- 2024: LDU Cuenca
- 2025: Héroes de Falcón
- 2026: Central Español (reserves)

Arcadio Pastor Márquez Castro (born 12 August 1977) is a Venezuelan football coach.

== Career ==
Born in Colón, Táchira, Márquez worked at several countries before being named manager of Dominican side Atlético Vega Real on 9 October 2015. He resigned the following 5 May, and was appointed in charge of Llaneros back in his home country on 13 August 2016.

Márquez left Llaneros on 15 March 2017, after winning only one point out of 15 in the new campaign. He was subsequently at the helm of Atlético Furrial, and led the side to a second place in the year's Tercera División.

On 3 February 2018, Márquez moved abroad again and took over Bolivian side Atlético Bermejo. He returned to Furrial in October, and avoided relegation from Segunda División with the side.

On 13 September 2019, Márquez was appointed manager of fellow second division side Libertador, and managed to avoid relegation with the side. He worked as manager of Ureña in the 2020 season, and took over Yaracuy on 15 February 2021.

On 6 August 2021, Márquez was announced as the head coach of Primera División club Mineros. He left by mutual consent at the end of the season, after avoiding relegation.

Márquez had a spell at Titanes in 2022, and was announced as the head coach of Ecuadorian Serie B side LDU Cuenca in July 2024. He returned to his home country on 11 March of the following year with Héroes de Falcón, but was sacked on 19 June.
