= Ureña S.C. =

Venezuelan football club

Ureña
- Full name: Ureña Sport Club
- Nickname(s): Los Azucareros (The Sugarmakers)
- Founded: 3 September 2008; 16 years ago
- Ground: Estadio Polideportivo Humberto Laureano; La Fría, Venezuela
- Capacity: 500
- Chairman: Argenis Cáceres
- Manager: Edwin Quilagury
- League: Segunda División
- 2023: Segunda División, 1st of 16 (champions)
Home colours	Away colours

Ureña Sport Club is a Venezuelan football team that is based in Ureña. Founded in 2008, they play in the Venezuelan Segunda División.

== History ==
Founded in 2008, Ureña SC played their first senior season in the 2009–10 Segunda División B, after acquiring the place of Inter Anzoátegui. Ahead of the 2010–11 season, they were invited to play in the Segunda División.

In 2015, Ureña achieved promotion to the Primera División, after winning the 2014–15 second division. They avoided relegation in the 2015 campaign, but dropped a level in 2016, after a poor Clausura tournament.

Ureña won their second Segunda División title in 2023 after defeating Bolívar in the finals, which also granted them promotion to the top flight for 2024. On 16 December 2023, however, it was announced that Ureña resigned from playing in the top tier due to economic problems, and had sold their spot to third-placed side Marítimo de La Guaira. Ureña's withdrawal from the Primera División tournament was confirmed on 31 January 2024, and the club eventually rejoined the second tier competition for the 2024 season.

== Honours ==
- Venezuelan Segunda División: 2014–15, 2023

== Managers ==
- (Venezuela) Edwin Quilagury (2009–2013)
- (Venezuela) Ronaldy Contreras (2013–2016)
- (Venezuela) Louey Salah (2017)
- (Venezuela) Rolando Suárez (2018)
- (Venezuela) Ronaldy Contreras (2018)
- (Venezuela) Rodin Duque (2019)
- (Venezuela) Pastor Márquez (2020)
- (Venezuela) Adolfo Monsalve (2021)
- (Venezuela) Tulio Pinilla (2022)
- (Venezuela) Adolfo Monsalve (2023)
- (Venezuela) Edwin Quilagury (2024–)
