= LALA F.C. =

Venezuelan football club

LALA
- Full name: Asociación Civil LALA Fútbol Club
- Founded: January 6, 2011; 14 years ago
- Dissolved: January 2022; 3 years ago
- Ground: Polideportivo Cachamay
- Capacity: 41,600
- Chairman: Euro Guzmán
- Manager: Elías Emmons
- League: Venezuelan Segunda División
- 2021: Primera División Oriental Group, 7th (relegated)
Home colours	Away colours

Asociación Civil LALA Fútbol Club were a Venezuelan football club based in Ciudad Guayana, which played in the Venezuelan Primera División between the 2019 and 2021 seasons. They were founded in 2011 and played their home matches at the Polideportivo Cachamay.

== History ==
They were founded in 2011 as Estudiantes de Caroni Fútbol Club.

Their first participation in the federated tournaments was in the now-defunct Venezuelan Segunda División B, in the 2011-12 season; playing in their debut against PDVSA Morichal, at the Comanche Botini in Maturín; losing by the narrowest of margins. They finished in fourth place in the Eastern Group with 21 points, just one point behind third place, thus narrowly missing out on qualifying for the Second Division's Final Tournament. However, they received an invitation to participate in this tournament after one of the qualified teams did not meet the requirements set by the FVF.

In the 2012 Permanencia Tournament, they played against 7 rivals, making a modest performance, finishing in sixth place with 15 points. Almost all of their rivals were teams from the Segunda Division. They achieved 3 victories and 6 draws, highlighting the away thrashing of the Mineros de Guayana reserve team; thanks to a hat-trick by player Hermes “Tillo” Mata, a brace by Colombian Edwin Martínez, and a goal by Alberth Depablos.

In the 2012-13 season, the B category of the Segunda Division was eliminated, so the academic club would compete in the Venezuelan Tercera División. It began its participation in the Apertura Tournament in the Eastern Group 1, along with 3 teams, in home-and-away matches, plus 4 matches with teams from the other eastern group. It finished first with 21 points, which earned it a spot in the Torneo de Promoción y Permanencia 2013 of the Segunda División for the second consecutive time. This time, they achieved the goal of ascending to the Venezuelan Segunda División after finishing fourth in the group and obtaining the only spot that this position (best fourth) provided, above Atlético Chivacoa (central group) and Deportivo Táchira B (western group).

In 2015, after a merger with Fundación Academia Deportiva Lala, the club changed name to Asociación Civil LALA Fútbol Club.

In December 2020, LALA was changing its name to Bolívar Sport Club, but the name change did not materialize. Later on, Bolívar S.C. were founded as an independent institution from LALA.
