= Metropolitanos F.C. =

Venezuelan football club

Metropolitanos
- Full name: Metropolitanos Fútbol Club
- Nickname: Los Violetas
- Founded: 3 August 2012; 14 years ago
- Ground: Estadio Olímpico de la UCV; Caracas, Venezuela
- Capacity: 23,940
- Chairman: Juan Carlos Ferro
- Manager: Francesco Stifano
- League: Liga FUTVE
- 2025: Liga FUTVE, 8th of 14
Home colours	Away colours	Third colours

Metropolitanos Fútbol Club is a Venezuelan professional football club based in Caracas. Founded in 2012, they play in the Venezuelan Primera División, holding home matches at the Estadio Olímpico de la UCV.

== History ==
Founded on 3 August 2012 under the name of Deportivo Metropolitano, the club took Lara FC's place in the Segunda División for the 2012–13 season, as the latter had severe financial problems. After Lara's dissolution, Unión Lara SC was refounded and started to play in the Tercera División.

After finishing fourth and missing out on promotion, Metropolitanos achieved promotion to the Primera División at the end of the 2013–14 campaign, after finishing in the second position. After suffering relegation in 2015, the club immediately returned to the top tier after winning the second division in 2016.

After narrowly avoiding relegation in 2017, Metropolitanos finished in the penultimate position overall in 2018, but benefitted from the league's expansion to remain in the first division. After the arrival of José María Morr as manager, the club qualified to the Copa Sudamericana in 2020 and 2021, aside from winning a first-ever title in 2022.

== Honours ==
- Venezuelan Primera División: 1

2022

- Venezuelan Segunda División: 1

2016

== Players ==
=== Current first team squad ===
As of 19 November 2026

Note: Flags indicate national team as defined under FIFA eligibility rules; some limited exceptions apply. Players may hold more than one non-FIFA nationality.

No.	Pos.	Nation	Player
1	GK	VEN	Yhonatann Yustiz
2	DF	ARG	Francisco Manenti
3	DF	VEN	Daniel Rivillo
4	DF	VEN	Andrés Ferro
5	MF	ARG	Rafael Sangiovani
6	DF	VEN	Yolfran Caricote
7	FW	VEN	Miku (captain)
8	MF	GHA	George Ayine
9	FW	ECU	Kavier Ortiz (on loan from Atlético Albacete)
10	FW	VEN	Jeizon Ramírez
11	FW	VEN	Saimon Ramírez
13	MF	VEN	Jaiver Gímenez
14	DF	VEN	Leonardo Pérez
15	MF	VEN	David Zalzman
16	FW	VEN	José Riasco (on loan from Philadelphia Union II)
17	DF	VEN	Ely Valderrey

No.	Pos.	Nation	Player
18	FW	VEN	Jesús Vargas
19	DF	VEN	Isaac Ramírez
20	MF	VEN	Rafael Acosta
21	MF	VEN	Robert Garcés
22	GK	VEN	Jesús Lara
23	FW	VEN	Marlon Díaz
24	DF	VEN	Ángel Jaimes
25	GK	VEN	Alan Vázquez
29	FW	VEN	Brayan Alcócer
30	MF	VEN	Jailerth Navarro
32	DF	VEN	Christian Camarillo
40	FW	VEN	Alexander Nieves
45	FW	VEN	Ángelo Rivas
70	FW	VEN	Alexis Rodríguez
88	FW	VEN	Richard Figueroa
99	FW	ARG	Agustín Bianciotti

== Managers ==
- (Venezuela) Rafael Santana (2012–2014)
- (Venezuela) Hugo Savarese (2014–2015)
- (Venezuela) Rafael Santana (2016–2017)
- (Venezuela) Daniel de Oliveira (2018)
- (Venezuela) Manuel di Maio (interim) (2018)
- (Venezuela) Jhon Giraldo (2018)
- (Venezuela) José María Morr (2019–2024)
