= Titanes F.C. =

Venezuelan football team

Titanes
- Full name: Titanes Fútbol Club Guanare
- Nickname(s): TFC; Bicolor
- Founded: 2016
- Ground: Estadio Rafael Calles Pinto
- Capacity: 13,000
- Chairman: Nelson Coronado
- Manager: Pastor Márquez
- League: Segunda División
- 2021: Segunda División, 1st
Home colours	Away colours

Titanes Fútbol Club Guanare, simply known as Titanes, is a Venezuelan football club based in Guanare, Portuguesa state. Founded in 2016, the club play in the Venezuelan Segunda División, hosting their home matches at the Estadio Rafael Calles Pinto.

== History ==
Founded in 2016, the club immediately started in the Venezuelan Segunda División after buying out the license of newly-promoted side Casa D'Italia. In 2018, the club changed colours in an attempt to get closer to the identity of dissolved Unión Atlético Maracaibo.

On 15 November 2021, Titanes won the second division after defeating Atlético La Cruz in the Finals, and achieved a first-ever promotion to the Venezuelan Primera División. On 30 December, the Venezuelan Football Federation announced the results of the club licensing process for the 2022 season, with Titanes being unable to take part in the competition, and having their promotion denied.

For the 2022 season, the club moved to the city of Guanare and was renamed into Titanes Fútbol Club Guanare.

== Honours ==
- Venezuelan Segunda División: 2021
