= Atlético Venezuela C.F. =

Association football club

Atlético Venezuela
- Full name: Atlético Venezuela Club de Fútbol
- Nickname(s): Atlético; El Equipo Nacional; El Tricolor
- Founded: 23 July 2009
- Dissolved: 2022
- Ground: Brígido Iriarte Stadium; Caracas, Venezuela
- Capacity: 12,500
- Website: www.atleticovenezuelacf.com
Home colours	Away colours	Third colours

Atlético Venezuela was a professional football club, founded and promoted to Venezuelan league in 2009 and 2012, based in Caracas.

== Achievements ==
- Segunda División Venezolana: 2

2009–10, 2011–12

- Torneo de Clausura Segunda División Venezolana: 2

2009–10, 2011–12

== Current squad ==
Note: Flags indicate national team as defined under FIFA eligibility rules; some limited exceptions apply. Players may hold more than one non-FIFA nationality.

No.	Pos.	Nation	Player
—	GK	(Venezuela) VEN	Eduardo Lima
—	GK	(Venezuela) VEN	Jesús Briceño
—	DF	(Venezuela) VEN	Francisco Fajardo
—	DF	(Venezuela) VEN	Maikol Vivas
—	DF	(Venezuela) VEN	Gianfranco Catapano
—	DF	(Venezuela) VEN	Ismael Páez
—	DF	(Venezuela) VEN	Luis Torres
—	DF	(Venezuela) VEN	Grenddy Perozo
—	DF	(Venezuela) VEN	Luis Morgillo
—	DF	(Venezuela) VEN	Jhoel Salazar

No.	Pos.	Nation	Player
—	MF	(Venezuela) VEN	Kuki Martins
—	MF	(Venezuela) VEN	Ágnel Flores
—	MF	(Venezuela) VEN	Junior Cedeño
—	MF	(Venezuela) VEN	Jesús Gómez
—	FW	(Venezuela) VEN	Luis José Castillo
—	FW	(Venezuela) VEN	Robin Ramos
—	FW	(Venezuela) VEN	Edder Farías

== Managers ==
- (Uruguay) Walter Roque (2008–09)
- (Venezuela) Rodrigo Piñon (2009)
- (Venezuela) Jesús Iglesias (2009–10)
- (Uruguay) Carlos Ravel (2010–11)
- (Venezuela) Edson Rodríguez (2010–11)
- (Venezuela) José Hernández (2012–13)
- (Venezuela) Manuel Plasencia (2015–)
