= Inter de Barinas =

Venezuelan football team

- Full name: Club Deportivo Internacional de Barinas
- Nicknames: Alados; Los Guerreros del Poblado
- Founded: 19 February 2015; 10 years ago (as Madeira Club Lara)
- Ground: Estadio Agustín Tovar; Estadio Reinaldo Melo
- Capacity: 29,800; 10,000
- Chairman: Omar Gustavo Farías
- Manager: Kike García
- League: Venezuelan Segunda División
- 2024: Primera División, 14th of 14 (relegated)
Home colours

Club Deportivo Internacional de Barinas, known as Inter de Barinas and previously named Club Deportivo Hermanos Colmenarez, is a Venezuelan football club based in Alberto Arvelo Torrealba Municipality, Barinas state. Founded in 2015, the club play in the Venezuelan Primera División, hosting their home matches at the Estadio Agustín Tovar in Barinas.

== History ==
Logo used until 2023

Originally founded in 2016, Hermanos Colmenarez first reached the Venezuelan Tercera División in the 2017 season. In December of that year, the club merged with then Tercera División champions Madeira Club Lara Asociación Civil (which was founded on 19 February 2015), and started to play in the Segunda División.

In 2020, after two seasons with mid-table positions, Hermanos Colmenarez won the second division after defeating Llaneros de Guanare in the semifinals and Universidad Central de Venezuela in the finals.

After rumours of a name change beginning in December 2023, Hermanos Colmenarez confirmed their change of name to Inter de Barinas on 30 January 2024.

== Players ==
=== First-team squad ===
As of 18 September 2024

Note: Flags indicate national team as defined under FIFA eligibility rules; some limited exceptions apply. Players may hold more than one non-FIFA nationality.

No.	Pos.	Nation	Player
1	GK	VEN	Álvaro Forero
2	DF	VEN	Isai Valladares
3	MF	VEN	Ángel Urdaneta
4	DF	VEN	Jose Manzanilla
7	DF	VEN	Jairo Perez
8	FW	VEN	Pedro Ramírez
9	FW	ECU	Kavier Ortiz
10	MF	VEN	Darwin Gómez
11	MF	URU	Álvaro Torres
12	GK	VEN	Luis Curiel
13	FW	VEN	César Martínez
14	MF	VEN	Gabriel Colmenarez
15	MF	GHA	Livingstone Adjin
16	DF	VEN	Jesus Parra
17	FW	VEN	Cesar Magallan
18	FW	PAR	Julio Doldán
20	DF	VEN	Gabriel Gonzalez
21	DF	VEN	Julio da Silva

No.	Pos.	Nation	Player
22	GK	VEN	Luis Forero
23	MF	VEN	Maicol Ruiz
24	DF	VEN	Johan Osorio
25	MF	VEN	Wilson Mujica
26	DF	VEN	Juan Deusa
27	DF	VEN	Joynner Rivera
28	MF	VEN	Jesus Alvarado
29	FW	VEN	David Leonardy
30	MF	VEN	Jose Rivas
31	MF	VEN	Miguel Pernia
32	DF	URU	Carlos Pimienta
33	DF	VEN	Moisés Acuña
34	MF	VEN	Leomar Mosquera
35	MF	VEN	Luis Urbina
99	FW	VEN	Rafael Castrillo

=== Out on loan ===
Note: Flags indicate national team as defined under FIFA eligibility rules; some limited exceptions apply. Players may hold more than one non-FIFA nationality.

No.	Pos.	Nation	Player

== Honours ==
- Venezuelan Segunda División
  - Champions (1): 2020
- Venezuelan Tercera División
  - Champions (1): 2017 (as Madeira Club Lara)
