= 2025 Liga FUTVE =

Venezuelan Primera División season

Liga FUTVE
- Season: 2025
- Dates: 24 January – 6 December 2025
- Champions: Universidad Central (4th title)
- Relegated: Yaracuyanos
- Copa Libertadores: Universidad Central; Deportivo La Guaira; Carabobo; Deportivo Táchira
- Copa Sudamericana: Academia Puerto Cabello; Monagas; Caracas; Metropolitanos
- Matches: 233
- Goals: 554 (2.38 per match)
- Top goalscorer: Edwuin Pernía (15 goals)
- Biggest home win: Dep. Táchira 4–0 Yaracuyanos (19 April); La Guaira 4–0 Rayo Zuliano (18 July); Dep. Táchira 4–0 Est. Mérida (31 August); La Guaira 4–0 Yaracuyanos (21 September); Metropolitanos 5–1 Portuguesa (27 September)
- Biggest away win: Caracas 1–5 UCV (5 October); Metropolitanos 0–4 Carabobo (5 November)
- Highest scoring: Anzoátegui 4–4 UCV (3 May)

The 2025 Liga FUTVE, officially Liga de Fútbol Profesional Venezolano, and known as Liga Banco de Venezuela due to sponsorship by Banco de Venezuela, was the 69th season of the Liga FUTVE, the top-flight football league in Venezuela, and the 44th season since the start of the professional era. The season began on 24 January and ended on 6 December 2025.

Universidad Central were the champions, winning their fourth league title, second in the professional era and first since 1957 after winning the Torneo Apertura and defeating Carabobo in the season's grand final. Deportivo Táchira were the defending champions, having won the title in the previous two seasons.

== Teams ==
Fourteen teams competed in the season, subject to the fulfillment of club licensing requirements: the top 13 teams of the 2024 season as well as the 2024 Segunda División champions Yaracuyanos, who defeated Anzoátegui in the Segunda División final on 30 November 2024. Yaracuyanos replaced Inter de Barinas, relegated at the end of the previous season after finishing last in the aggregate table.

Following the end of the 2024 season, it was reported that Angostura and the Segunda División runners-up Anzoátegui were negotiating a merger, with which Anzoátegui would take Angostura's place in Primera División. On 14 January 2025, the Liga FUTVE informed that Anzoátegui would replace Angostura in the tournament, but the latter club would take the former's spot in Segunda División. Four days later, the Venezuelan Football Federation confirmed that Angostura failed to comply with the financial requirements for a club license, whilst Anzoátegui had a higher sporting merit and had also fully met the licensing criteria.

Locations of the 2025 Primera División teams
Locations of the 2025 Primera División teams – Caracas

Relegated to 2025 Segunda División: 12 / Angostura (failed to meet licensing requirements); 14 / Inter de Barinas	Promoted to 2025 Primera División: 1 / Yaracuyanos; 2 / Anzoátegui

=== Stadia and locations ===
Team	City	Stadium	Capacity
Academia Puerto Cabello	Puerto Cabello	La Bombonerita	7,500
Anzoátegui	Puerto La Cruz	José Antonio Anzoátegui	37,485
Carabobo	Valencia	Misael Delgado	10,400
Caracas	Caracas	Olímpico de la UCV	23,940
Deportivo La Guaira	Caracas	Olímpico de la UCV	23,940
Deportivo Táchira	San Cristóbal	Polideportivo de Pueblo Nuevo	38,755
Estudiantes de Mérida	Mérida	Metropolitano de Mérida	42,200
Metropolitanos	Caracas	Olímpico de la UCV	23,940
Monagas	Maturín	Monumental de Maturín	51,796
Portuguesa	Acarigua	General José Antonio Páez	18,000
Rayo Zuliano	Maracaibo	José Pachencho Romero	40,800
Universidad Central	Caracas	Olímpico de la UCV	23,940
Yaracuyanos	San Felipe	Florentino Oropeza	10,000
Zamora	Barinas	Agustín Tovar	29,800

=== Personnel and kits ===
Team	Manager	Kit manufacturer	Main shirt sponsors
Academia Puerto Cabello	(Venezuela) Eduardo Saragó	Givova	CLX Samsung
Anzoátegui	(Venezuela) Leonardo González	Kappa	Banco del Tesoro
Carabobo	(Venezuela) Daniel Farías	Runic	Frigilux, Fospuca, Juega En Línea
Caracas	(Venezuela) Fernando Aristeguieta	Zeus	1XBET, Maltín Polar
Deportivo La Guaira	(Venezuela) Juan Domingo Tolisano	Runic	Traki
Deportivo Táchira	(Venezuela) Edgar Pérez Greco	Boman	TriunfoBet, Rutaca Airlines, Grupo JHS
Estudiantes de Mérida	(Venezuela) Jesús Ortiz	Econtex	Savoy, Frigilux, Daka, Ivon
Metropolitanos	(Venezuela) Francesco Stifano	RS	Aerolíneas Estelar, Forum Supermayorista
Monagas	(Venezuela) Enrique García	RS	Banplus
Portuguesa	(Venezuela) Giancarlo Maldonado	RS	
Rayo Zuliano	(Venezuela) Johanny García	Adidas	Campestre, Daka, Javitour, BDT, Farma Express
Universidad Central	(Venezuela) Daniel Sasso	New Arrival	SmartByte, Empire Keeway, Bancamiga
Yaracuyanos	(Venezuela) Arnaldo Aranda	Manita	Purísima, TriunfoBet
Zamora	(Venezuela) José María Morr	Puma	Thundernet, BDT

==== Managerial changes ====
Team	Outgoing manager	Manner of departure	Date of vacancy	Position in table	Incoming manager	Date of appointment
Torneo Apertura
Monagas	(Venezuela) Carlojavier Fuhrman	End of caretaker spell	8 December 2024	Pre-season	(Venezuela) Jhonny Ferreira	16 January 2025
Metropolitanos	(Venezuela) José María Morr	Resigned	11 December 2024	Pre-season	(Uruguay) Roland Marcenaro	20 December 2024
Anzoátegui	(Venezuela) Alexis Jordán	Replaced	26 December 2024	Pre-season	(Venezuela) Leonardo González	26 December 2024
Zamora	(Venezuela) Alí Cañas	End of contract	30 December 2024	Pre-season	(Venezuela) Adolfo Monsalve	6 January 2025
Academia Puerto Cabello	(Spain) Iván Fernández	Mutual agreement	31 January 2025	12th	(Venezuela) Bladimir Morales (Note: Caretaker manager.)	1 February 2025
Academia Puerto Cabello	(Venezuela) Bladimir Morales	End of caretaker spell	3 February 2025	7th	(Portugal) Vasco Faísca	3 February 2025
Zamora	(Venezuela) Adolfo Monsalve	Mutual agreement	3 March 2025	12th	(Venezuela) José María Morr	4 March 2025
Yaracuyanos	(Venezuela) Jhon Pinto	Sacked	17 March 2025	14th	(Colombia) Dayron Pérez	17 March 2025
Estudiantes de Mérida	(Venezuela) Daniel Farías	Mutual agreement	15 April 2025	13th	(Venezuela) Ildemaro Fernández	15 April 2025
Estudiantes de Mérida	(Venezuela) Ildemaro Fernández	End of caretaker spell	2 May 2025	12th	(Venezuela) Jesús Ortiz	2 May 2025
Rayo Zuliano	(Venezuela) Javier Villafráz	Replaced	11 May 2025	11th	(Venezuela) Johanny García	11 May 2025
Academia Puerto Cabello	(Portugal) Vasco Faísca	Mutual agreement	29 May 2025	3rd, Group B	(Venezuela) Bladimir Morales	29 May 2025
Carabobo	(Spain) Diego Merino	Resigned	30 May 2025	2nd, Group B	(Venezuela) Daniel Farías	31 May 2025
Academia Puerto Cabello	(Venezuela) Bladimir Morales	End of caretaker spell	3 June 2025	4th, Group B	(Venezuela) Eduardo Saragó	3 June 2025
Torneo Clausura
Monagas	(Venezuela) Jhonny Ferreira	Signed by Venezuela U17	8 July 2025	14th	(Venezuela) Carlojavier Fuhrman	8 July 2025
Monagas	(Venezuela) Carlojavier Fuhrman	End of caretaker spell	16 July 2025	13th	(Argentina) Marcelo Zuleta	16 July 2025
Yaracuyanos	(Colombia) Dayron Pérez	Signed by Barranquilla	23 July 2025	13th	(Venezuela) Arnaldo Aranda	23 July 2025
Metropolitanos	(Uruguay) Roland Marcenaro	Mutual agreement	12 August 2025	12th	(Venezuela) Francesco Stifano	13 August 2025
Monagas	(Argentina) Marcelo Zuleta	Sacked	8 October 2025	4th	(Venezuela) Enrique García	8 October 2025

== Torneo Apertura ==
The Torneo Apertura was the first tournament of the 2025 season. It began on 24 January and ended on 14 June 2025.

=== First stage ===
==== Standings ====
Pos	Team	Pld	W	D	L	GF	GA	GD	Pts	Qualification
1	Deportivo La Guaira	13	7	5	1	20	11	+9	26	Advance to the semi-finals
2	Carabobo	13	7	5	1	13	7	+6	26	Advance to the semi-finals
3	Universidad Central	13	7	4	2	15	9	+6	25	Advance to the semi-finals
4	Deportivo Táchira	13	6	5	2	19	10	+9	23	Advance to the semi-finals
5	Academia Puerto Cabello	13	6	3	4	14	10	+4	21	Advance to the semi-finals
6	Anzoátegui	13	5	5	3	17	12	+5	20	Advance to the semi-finals
7	Portuguesa	13	5	3	5	14	14	0	18	Advance to the semi-finals
8	Metropolitanos	13	4	4	5	17	18	−1	16	Advance to the semi-finals
9	Caracas	13	4	4	5	12	15	−3	16	
10	Monagas	13	4	3	6	17	21	−4	15	
11	Rayo Zuliano	13	4	2	7	13	17	−4	14	
12	Estudiantes de Mérida	13	3	1	9	15	23	−8	10	
13	Zamora	13	2	3	8	10	17	−7	9	
14	Yaracuyanos	13	1	5	7	12	24	−12	8	

Source: Liga FUTVE, Soccerway
Rules for classification: 1) Points; 2) Goal difference; 3) Goals scored; 4) Head-to-head results; 5) Drawing of lots.

==== Results ====
Home \ Away	APC	ANZ	CBO	CAR	DLG	TAC	ESM	MET	MON	POR	RAY	UCV	YAR	ZAM
Academia Puerto Cabello	—	0–0	1–3	—	—	3–2	—	—	1–0	2–1	1–0	—	—	—
Anzoátegui	—	—	—	—	0–1	0–0	—	3–1	—	0–0	3–1	—	1–1	2–0
Carabobo	—	1–0	—	—	—	0–0	—	—	1–0	0–0	1–0	—	2–2	—
Caracas	0–0	1–0	0–1	—	—	—	0–0	1–0	1–4	—	—	—	—	—
Deportivo La Guaira	0–0	—	0–0	1–0	—	—	2–1	4–1	—	—	—	2–2	—	—
Deportivo Táchira	—	—	—	1–0	2–1	—	—	1–1	—	1–1	—	1–0	4–0	0–0
Estudiantes de Mérida	1–0	3–4	0–2	—	—	2–3	—	1–2	2–0	—	1–0	—	—	—
Metropolitanos	2–1	—	3–0	—	—	—	—	—	2–2	—	4–2	0–1	—	0–0
Monagas	—	2–3	—	—	1–1	1–4	—	—	—	0–2	3–2	—	2–1	2–1
Portuguesa	—	—	—	0–2	1–3	—	4–2	2–1	—	—	—	0–1	1–0	2–1
Rayo Zuliano	—	—	—	1–1	1–1	1–0	—	—	—	1–0	—	0–2	2–0	2–0
Universidad Central	1–0	1–1	1–1	1–3	—	—	2–1	—	0–0	—	—	—	—	—
Yaracuyanos	0–3	—	—	3–3	1–2	—	2–0	0–0	—	—	—	0–2	—	2–2
Zamora	0–2	—	0–1	3–0	1–2	—	2–1	—	—	—	—	0–1	—	—

Source: Liga FUTVE, Soccerway
Legend: Blue = home team win; Yellow = draw; Red = away team win.

=== Semi-finals ===
The eight teams that advanced to the semi-finals were drawn into two groups of four teams. The two group winners advanced to the final.

==== Group A ====
Pos	Team	Pld	W	D	L	GF	GA	GD	Pts	Qualification	UCV	DLG	POR	ANZ
1	Universidad Central	6	3	3	0	15	11	+4	12	Advance to the Final	—	3–2	2–2	2–2
2	Deportivo La Guaira	6	3	1	2	10	7	+3	10		0–1	—	1–1	3–1
3	Portuguesa	6	0	4	2	6	9	−3	4		1–3	1–2	—	0–0
4	Anzoátegui	6	0	4	2	8	12	−4	4		4–4	0–2	1–1	—

Source: Liga FUTVE, Soccerway
Legend: Blue = home team win; Yellow = draw; Red = away team win.
Rules for classification: 1) Points; 2) Goal difference; 3) Goals scored; 4) Head-to-head results; 5) Drawing of lots.

==== Group B ====
Pos	Team	Pld	W	D	L	GF	GA	GD	Pts	Qualification	TAC	CBO	MET	APC
1	Deportivo Táchira	6	5	0	1	11	5	+6	15	Advance to the Final	—	1–0	1–0	2–0
2	Carabobo	6	2	2	2	10	9	+1	8		2–4	—	2–2	0–0
3	Metropolitanos	6	1	3	2	7	9	−2	6		2–1	1–3	—	1–1
4	Academia Puerto Cabello	6	0	3	3	4	9	−5	3		1–2	1–3	1–1	—

Source: Liga FUTVE, Soccerway
Legend: Blue = home team win; Yellow = draw; Red = away team win.
Rules for classification: 1) Points; 2) Goal difference; 3) Goals scored; 4) Head-to-head results; 5) Drawing of lots.

=== Final ===
14 June 2025
17:30 UTC−4

Universidad Central	1–0	Deportivo Táchira
K. Silva 61'	Report

Estadio Olímpico de la UCV, Caracas
Referee: Emikar Calderas

== Torneo Clausura ==
The Torneo Clausura was the second and last tournament of the 2025 season. It began on 4 July and ended on 23 November 2025.

=== First stage ===
==== Standings ====
Pos	Team	Pld	W	D	L	GF	GA	GD	Pts	Qualification
1	Deportivo La Guaira	13	10	1	2	29	8	+21	31	Advance to the semi-finals
2	Deportivo Táchira	13	8	3	2	23	12	+11	27	Advance to the semi-finals
3	Carabobo	13	7	4	2	14	8	+6	25	Advance to the semi-finals
4	Monagas	13	6	4	3	19	15	+4	22	Advance to the semi-finals
5	Caracas	13	6	3	4	17	17	0	21	Advance to the semi-finals
6	Zamora	13	6	1	6	11	15	−4	19	Advance to the semi-finals
7	Academia Puerto Cabello	13	4	6	3	12	10	+2	18	Advance to the semi-finals
8	Metropolitanos	13	5	2	6	21	19	+2	17	Advance to the semi-finals
9	Universidad Central	13	5	2	6	19	18	+1	17	
10	Estudiantes de Mérida	13	5	1	7	11	16	−5	16	
11	Rayo Zuliano	13	4	1	8	10	19	−9	13	
12	Anzoátegui	13	3	2	8	10	18	−8	11	
13	Yaracuyanos	13	3	1	9	11	21	−10	10	
14	Portuguesa (Note: Portuguesa were deducted three points as punishment for failing to meet debt payment deadlines.)	13	3	1	9	10	21	−11	7	

Source: Liga FUTVE, Soccerway
Rules for classification: 1) Points; 2) Goal difference; 3) Goals scored; 4) Head-to-head results; 5) Drawing of lots.

==== Results ====
Home \ Away	APC	ANZ	CBO	CAR	DLG	TAC	ESM	MET	MON	POR	RAY	UCV	YAR	ZAM
Academia Puerto Cabello	—	—	—	0–0	1–0	—	1–2	2–2	—	—	—	2–2	1–0	3–0
Anzoátegui	1–0	—	0–0	0–1	—	—	0–1	—	2–2	—	—	0–2	—	—
Carabobo	2–0	—	—	1–0	0–0	—	2–1	0–0	—	—	—	4–1	—	1–0
Caracas	—	—	—	—	0–3	1–1	—	—	—	2–0	2–1	1–5	3–1	2–0
Deportivo La Guaira	—	1–2	—	—	—	3–1	—	—	2–0	3–1	4–0	—	4–0	2–0
Deportivo Táchira	0–0	1–0	3–0	—	—	—	4–0	—	2–1	—	2–0	—	—	—
Estudiantes de Mérida	—	—	—	1–0	1–2	—	—	—	—	2–0	—	0–0	0–2	2–1
Metropolitanos	—	1–2	—	2–3	1–3	2–3	1–0	—	—	5–1	—	—	2–1	—
Monagas	1–1	—	2–0	2–2	—	—	1–0	2–0	—	—	—	2–0	—	—
Portuguesa	0–1	3–1	0–0	—	—	2–0	—	—	0–1	—	1–2	—	—	—
Rayo Zuliano	0–0	2–0	0–2	—	—	—	2–1	0–1	3–1	—	—	—	—	—
Universidad Central	—	—	—	—	1–2	1–2	—	1–4	—	2–0	3–0	—	1–0	0–1
Yaracuyanos	—	2–1	1–2	—	—	1–3	—	—	1–1	1–2	1–0	—	—	—
Zamora	—	2–1	—	—	—	1–1	—	1–0	2–3	1–0	1–0	—	1–0	—

Source: Liga FUTVE, Soccerway
Legend: Blue = home team win; Yellow = draw; Red = away team win.

=== Semi-finals ===
The eight teams that advanced to the semi-finals were drawn into two groups of four teams. The two group winners advanced to the final.

==== Group A ====
Pos	Team	Pld	W	D	L	GF	GA	GD	Pts	Qualification	APC	DLG	ZAM	MON
1	Academia Puerto Cabello	5	4	1	0	11	4	+7	13	Advance to the Final	—	3–1	3–0	3–2
2	Deportivo La Guaira	6	2	2	2	5	7	−2	8		0–0	—	1–1	2–1
3	Zamora	5	2	1	2	5	5	0	7		— (Note: The match between Zamora and Academia Puerto Cabello was suspended at half-time with Academia Puerto Cabello leading 1–0 due to an electrical failure at Estadio Agustín Tovar. Although its resumption was scheduled for 11 November, the match was ultimately cancelled per request from both clubs as it would have no effect on the final outcome of the group.)	2–0	—	2–0
4	Monagas	6	1	0	5	5	10	−5	3		1–2	0–1	1–0	—

Source: Liga FUTVE, Soccerway
Legend: Blue = home team win; Yellow = draw; Red = away team win.
Rules for classification: 1) Points; 2) Goal difference; 3) Goals scored; 4) Head-to-head results; 5) Drawing of lots.

==== Group B ====
Pos	Team	Pld	W	D	L	GF	GA	GD	Pts	Qualification	CBO	CAR	TAC	MET
1	Carabobo	6	4	2	0	10	2	+8	14	Advance to the Final	—	2–0	1–1	1–0
2	Caracas	6	2	3	1	7	7	0	9		0–0	—	0–0	1–1
3	Deportivo Táchira	6	1	3	2	7	7	0	6		1–2	2–3	—	2–0
4	Metropolitanos	6	0	2	4	4	12	−8	2		0–4	2–3	1–1	—

Source: Liga FUTVE, Soccerway
Legend: Blue = home team win; Yellow = draw; Red = away team win.
Rules for classification: 1) Points; 2) Goal difference; 3) Goals scored; 4) Head-to-head results; 5) Drawing of lots.

=== Final ===
23 November 2025
18:00 UTC−4

Carabobo	1–0	Academia Puerto Cabello
Riasco 59'	Report

Estadio Misael Delgado, Valencia
Referee: Jesús Valenzuela

== Grand Final ==
The winners of the Apertura (Universidad Central) and Clausura (Carabobo) tournaments played a two-legged final series to decide the season champions (Campeón Absoluto). The second leg was hosted by the Clausura winners, Carabobo. The season champions qualified for the Copa Libertadores group stage while the season runners-up qualified for the Copa Libertadores second stage.

30 November 2025
18:00 UTC−4

Universidad Central	1–1	Carabobo
Murillo 45+2'	Report	Simarra 66' (o.g.)

Estadio Olímpico de la UCV, Caracas
Referee: Yender Herrera

6 December 2025
18:00 UTC−4

Carabobo	0–2	Universidad Central
	Report	Zapata 75' (pen.); Machís 81'

Estadio Misael Delgado, Valencia
Referee: Rony Cueva

Universidad Central won 3–1 on aggregate.

Liga FUTVE
2025 champions

4th title

== Aggregate table ==
Pos	Team	Pld	W	D	L	GF	GA	GD	Pts	Qualification or relegation
1	Deportivo La Guaira	26	17	6	3	49	19	+30	57	Qualification for Copa Libertadores group stage
2	Carabobo	26	14	9	3	27	15	+12	51	Qualification for Copa Libertadores second stage
3	Deportivo Táchira	26	14	8	4	42	22	+20	50	Qualification for Copa Libertadores first stage
4	Universidad Central (C)	26	12	6	8	34	27	+7	42	Qualification for Copa Libertadores group stage
5	Academia Puerto Cabello	26	10	9	7	26	20	+6	39	Qualification for Copa Sudamericana first stage (Note: Academia Puerto Cabello qualified for the Copa Sudamericana first stage as 2025 Clausura runners-up.)
6	Monagas	26	10	7	9	36	36	0	37	Qualification for Copa Sudamericana first stage
7	Caracas	26	10	7	9	29	32	−3	37	Qualification for Copa Sudamericana first stage
8	Metropolitanos	26	9	6	11	38	37	+1	33	Qualification for Copa Sudamericana first stage
9	Anzoátegui	26	8	7	11	28	31	−3	31	
10	Zamora	26	8	4	14	22	33	−11	28	
11	Rayo Zuliano	26	8	3	15	23	36	−13	27	
12	Estudiantes de Mérida	26	8	2	16	26	39	−13	26	
13	Portuguesa (Note: Portuguesa were deducted three points as punishment for failing to meet debt payment deadlines.)	26	8	4	14	24	35	−11	25	
14	Yaracuyanos (R)	26	4	6	16	23	45	−22	18	Relegation to Segunda División

Source: Liga FUTVE
Rules for classification: 1) Points; 2) Goal difference; 3) Goals scored; 4) Head-to-head results; 5) Drawing of lots.
(C) Champions; (R) Relegated

== Top goalscorers ==
Rank	Player	Club	Goals
1	(Venezuela) Edwuin Pernía	Academia Puerto Cabello	15
2	(Venezuela) Aitor López	Portuguesa	14
3	(Colombia) Juan Camilo Zapata	Universidad Central	13
4	(Venezuela) José Alí Meza	Deportivo La Guaira	12
5	(Colombia) Antony Velasco	Anzoátegui	10
5	(Colombia) Flabián Londoño	Carabobo	10
7	(Venezuela) José Hernández Chávez	Caracas	9
8	(Venezuela) Antonio Romero	Estudiantes de Mérida / Zamora	8
8	(Venezuela) Bryan Castillo	Deportivo Táchira	8
8	(Venezuela) Jesús Hernández	Estudiantes de Mérida	8
8	(Venezuela) José Balza	Deportivo Táchira	8
8	(Colombia) Juan Manuel Cuesta	Universidad Central	8
8	(Venezuela) Keiber Lamadrid	Deportivo La Guaira	8
8	(Venezuela) Miku Fedor	Metropolitanos	8
8	(Panama) Tomás Rodríguez	Monagas	8
8	(Venezuela) Yackson Rivas	Deportivo La Guaira	8
8	(Venezuela) Yohandry Orozco	Carabobo	8

Source: Balonazos

== See also ==
- 2025 Copa Venezuela
