= 2020 Liga FUTVE =

Liga FUTVE
- Season: 2020
- Dates: 30 January – 15 May 2020 (cancelled); 14 October – 15 December 2020 (resumption under new format)
- Champions: Deportivo La Guaira (1st title)
- Relegated: None
- Copa Libertadores: Deportivo La Guaira; Deportivo Táchira; Deportivo Lara; Caracas
- Copa Sudamericana: Academia Puerto Cabello; Aragua; Metropolitanos; Mineros
- Matches: 130
- Goals: 325 (2.5 per match)
- Top goalscorer: Richard Blanco; Edder Farías (8 goals each)
- Biggest home win: Deportivo Lara 4–0 Atl. Venezuela (18 November); Caracas 6–2 GV Maracay (23 November)
- Biggest away win: GV Maracay 0–4 Caracas (30 October); Trujillanos 0–4 Pto. Cabello (9 December)
- Highest scoring: Caracas 6–2 GV Maracay (23 November)

The 2020 Primera División season, officially Liga de Fútbol Profesional Venezolano or Liga FUTVE, was the 39th professional season of the Venezuelan Primera División, Venezuela's top-flight football league. Caracas were the defending champions.

The competition was suspended on 12 March due to the COVID-19 pandemic, with all the results recorded until then voided on 15 May, and was reset starting from 14 October with a new format, ending on 15 December 2020. Deportivo La Guaira won their first league title, beating Deportivo Táchira by a score of 2–0 in the final played at Valencia.

== Format changes ==
=== Original format ===
The league format changed for the 2020 season. No Apertura and Clausura tournaments would be held and the 20 teams would face each other in a home-and-away round-robin tournament, for a total of 38 matches per team. The top eight teams of the first stage would advance to the semi-final stage, depending on eligibility requirements for CONMEBOL tournaments. The bottom two teams would be relegated. In the semi-final stage, the eight teams would be divided in two groups of four teams each, facing the other teams in their group twice. The two group winners would advance to the Serie Final to decide the league champions.

=== New format ===
Due to the COVID-19 pandemic, the league was suspended on 12 March. On 15 May, the FVF announced the permanent suspension of the competition, with all first stage matches being voided.

On 18 September, a new format was announced by the FVF and the Liga FUTVE, with the teams divided in two groups, playing each other twice. The group winners decided the league champions in a single match, and the next three teams of each group were awarded the remaining berths for CONMEBOL tournaments. Matches were played in Barinas, Puerto Cabello and Valencia. Relegation was suspended until 2021. Due to the format change of the Copa Sudamericana, the play-offs to decide the order of berths for the tournament were not played.

== Teams ==
On 24 January, Llaneros was administratively relegated to the Segunda División by FVF as ordered by FIFA due to a lawsuit by former player Leonardo Ossa, whom the club failed to pay an outstanding debt. Llaneros played in the second tier during the 2020 season, therefore the league was contested by 19 teams.

Zulia and LALA withdrew from the competition on 7 September due to safety concerns caused by the pandemic.

=== Stadia and locations ===
Locations of the 2020 Primera División teams

Relegated to 2020 Segunda División
16	Llaneros (administrative relegation)
19	Estudiantes de Caracas
20	Deportivo Anzoátegui

Promoted to 2020 Primera División
1	Yaracuyanos
2	GV Maracay

Team	Manager	City	Stadium	Capacity
Academia Puerto Cabello	(Venezuela) Carlos Maldonado	Puerto Cabello	La Bombonerita	7,500
Aragua	(Venezuela) Enrique García	Maracay	Olímpico Hermanos Ghersi Páez	14,000
Atlético Venezuela	(Venezuela) Jair Díaz	Caracas	Brígido Iriarte	10,000
Atlético Venezuela	(Venezuela) Jair Díaz	Caracas	Olímpico de la UCV (Note: Used by Atlético Venezuela as temporary home stadium while Estadio Brígido Iriarte is being remodeled.)	23,940
Carabobo	(Venezuela) José Parada	Valencia	Misael Delgado	10,400
Carabobo	(Venezuela) José Parada	San Felipe	Florentino Oropeza (Note: Used by Carabobo as home stadium for their matches against Gran Valencia and Monagas while Estadio Misael Delgado was being remodeled.)	10,000
Caracas	(Venezuela) Noel Sanvicente	Caracas	Olímpico de la UCV	23,940
Deportivo La Guaira	(Venezuela) Daniel Farías	Caracas	Olímpico de la UCV	23,940
Deportivo Lara	(Venezuela) Leonardo González	Cabudare	Metropolitano de Cabudare	47,913
Deportivo Lara	(Venezuela) Leonardo González	Barquisimeto	Farid Richa (Note: Used by Deportivo Lara as temporary home stadium while Estadio Metropolitano de Cabudare is being remodeled.)	12,480
Deportivo Táchira	(Venezuela) Juan Tolisano	San Cristóbal	Polideportivo de Pueblo Nuevo	38,755
Estudiantes de Mérida	(Argentina) Martín Brignani	Mérida	Metropolitano de Mérida	42,200
Estudiantes de Mérida	(Argentina) Martín Brignani	Mérida	Guillermo Soto Rosa (Note: Used by Estudiantes de Mérida as temporary home stadium while Estadio Metropolitano de Mérida was being remodeled.)	14,000
GV Maracay	(Venezuela) Bladimir Morales	Maracay	Giuseppe Antonelli	7,500
GV Maracay	(Venezuela) Bladimir Morales	San Felipe	Florentino Oropeza (Note: Used by GV Maracay as home stadium for their matches against Yaracuyanos and Mineros.)	10,000
LALA	(Venezuela) Rubén Yori	Ciudad Guayana	Polideportivo Cachamay	41,600
Metropolitanos	(Venezuela) José María Morr	Caracas	Olímpico de la UCV	23,940
Mineros de Guayana	(Venezuela) Leonel Vielma	Ciudad Guayana	Polideportivo Cachamay	41,600
Monagas	(Venezuela) Jhonny Ferreira	Maturín	Monumental de Maturín	51,796
Portuguesa	(Venezuela) Alí Cañas	Acarigua	General José Antonio Páez	18,000
Trujillanos	(Venezuela) Martín Carrillo	Valera	José Alberto Pérez	25,000
Yaracuyanos	(Venezuela) Jesús Alonso Cabello	San Felipe	Florentino Oropeza	10,000
Zamora	(Venezuela) Luis Terán (caretaker)	Barinas	Agustín Tovar	29,800
Zulia	(Colombia) Alex García King	Maracaibo	José "Pachencho" Romero	40,800

==== Managerial changes ====
Team	Outgoing manager	Manner of departure	Date of vacancy	Position in table	Incoming manager	Date of appointment
Original tournament
Carabobo	(Venezuela) Jhonny Ferreira	Mutual consent	11 December 2019	Pre-season	(Venezuela) Tony Franco	13 December 2019
Monagas	(Venezuela) May Montoya	End of caretaker spell	12 December 2019	Pre-season	(Venezuela) Jhonny Ferreira	12 December 2019
Mineros	(Venezuela) Laydeker Navas	End of caretaker spell	14 December 2019	Pre-season	(Venezuela) Richard Páez	14 December 2019
Zamora	(Uruguay) Rubén Benítez	End of caretaker spell	24 December 2019	Pre-season	(Venezuela) José Manuel Rey	24 December 2019
Zulia	(Venezuela) Alexander Rondón	Replaced	3 January	Pre-season	(Colombia) Alex García King	3 January
LALA	(Venezuela) Del Valle Rojas	Sacked	16 January	Pre-season	(Venezuela) Rubén Yori	21 January
New tournament
Mineros	(Venezuela) Richard Páez	Resigned	30 June	Pre-tournament	(Venezuela) Leonel Vielma	13 October
Portuguesa	(Venezuela) José Parada	Sacked	1 September	Pre-tournament	(Venezuela) Alí Cañas	3 September
Carabobo	(Venezuela) Tony Franco	Mutual consent	29 October	7th, Group A	(Venezuela) José Parada	29 October
Atlético Venezuela	(Venezuela) Henry Meléndez	Mutual consent	31 October	9th, Group A	(Venezuela) Jair Díaz	1 November
Zamora	(Venezuela) José Manuel Rey	Sacked	8 December	5th, Group B	(Venezuela) Luis Terán (caretaker)	9 December

== Effects of the COVID-19 pandemic ==
Due to the COVID-19 pandemic, on 12 March the Liga FUTVE announced the suspension of the seventh round of matches, scheduled for the weekend of 14–15 March. That same day, the FVF announced the suspension of every footballing activity in the country. On 15 March, the Liga FUTVE cancelled a meeting originally scheduled for 18 March and also confirmed the indefinite suspension of the Primera División tournament.

On 15 May, and after an emergency meeting held the previous day via video conference, the FVF announced the "permanent suspension" of the Primera and Segunda División seasons due to the inability to resume play under the conditions initially stated in the league regulations, effectively voiding the standings and results of matches played up until the suspension of the season. At the same time, the Federation's Commission of Club Competitions was tasked with elaborating a new tournament with a format and regulations suited to the necessary conditions for its execution, considering the application of sporting merit, club licensing requirements, and medical protocols. That same day, the Liga FUTVE issued a statement in which it rejected the suspension and voiding of the results of the 2020 season by the FVF, stating that the decision was made without consulting the league nor the teams, which was deemed to be as "a disrespect as well as putting at risk the economic and sports stability" of sports institutions.

In early June both the FVF and the Liga FUTVE presented, on their own, proposals to resume the competition. While the organization administering the league proposed to resume the tournament at the point at which it was suspended and play a single round-robin instead of a double round-robin as originally planned, with matches played only in the Carabobo state, the governing body proposed to play a new tournament from scratch with the teams split into two groups according to geographical proximity. On 14 June, the Venezuelan government authorized clubs to resume their training sessions starting from 15 June under biosecurity protocols and announced that the organizers of the football league had to put together a plan along with the National Institute of Sport (IND) to establish the new schedule and dates for the competition. Activities were also restricted to the "Carabobo-Yaracuy axis" as those were two of the states with the lowest rates of infection for COVID-19. However, following a letter sent to the FVF by FIFA in which it confirmed that the power to organize the national football league rested in the national governing body, on 10 July the Liga FUTVE decided to withdraw their proposal to resume the competition, leaving the responsibility to organize the tournament on the FVF.

On 7 September, Zulia announced that they would not be taking part in the tournament, arguing that the adequate biosecurity conditions were not in place to resume activities. That same day, LALA also declined to take part due to the same issues raised by Zulia.

The new format was announced on 18 September, with the group stage taking place in Barinas, Puerto Cabello and Valencia.

== First stage ==
The first stage began on 30 January. Each team would play each other twice for 36 matchdays. It was scheduled to end on 25 October with the top eight teams advancing to the semi-finals and the bottom team being relegated. The first stage standings and matches up to the suspension of the league on 12 March were voided by the FVF on 15 May.

=== Standings ===
Pos	Team	Pld	W	D	L	GF	GA	GD	Pts
1	Zamora	6	5	1	0	10	2	+8	16
2	Caracas	6	4	2	0	12	2	+10	14
3	Deportivo Lara	6	4	1	1	9	4	+5	13
4	Monagas	6	3	3	0	10	4	+6	12
5	Atlético Venezuela	6	3	2	1	7	5	+2	11
6	Estudiantes de Mérida	6	3	1	2	10	9	+1	10
7	Deportivo La Guaira	5	2	2	1	6	4	+2	8
8	Trujillanos	5	2	2	1	2	2	0	8
9	Zulia	5	2	1	2	7	10	−3	7
10	Aragua	5	2	0	3	4	4	0	6
11	Academia Puerto Cabello	5	1	3	1	4	5	−1	6
12	Metropolitanos	6	2	0	4	9	11	−2	6
13	Yaracuyanos	6	1	3	2	5	7	−2	6
14	Mineros de Guayana	6	2	0	4	4	7	−3	6
15	Carabobo	6	1	3	2	2	6	−4	6
16	Portuguesa	6	1	2	3	3	7	−4	5
17	Deportivo Táchira	5	1	1	3	2	6	−4	4
18	GV Maracay	6	0	2	4	2	8	−6	2
19	LALA	6	0	1	5	5	10	−5	1

Source: Liga FUTVE, Soccerway
Rules for classification: 1) Points; 2) Goal difference; 3) Goals scored.

=== Results ===
Home \ Away	APC	ARA	AVE	CBO	CAR	DLG	LAR	TAC	ESM	GVM	LAL	MET	MIN	MON	POR	TRU	YAR	ZAM	ZUL
Academia Puerto Cabello	—	—	—	—	—	—	—	—	—	—	2–1	—	—	—	—	—	—	0–0	—
Aragua	—	—	—	—	0–1	—	0–1	1–0	—	—	—	—	—	—	—	—	—	—	—
Atlético Venezuela	—	—	—	—	—	—	—	—	—	1–0	—	2–1	—	2–2	—	—	—	—	—
Carabobo	—	—	—	—	—	0–0	—	—	—	0–0	—	—	—	0–0	—	—	—	—	—
Caracas	1–1	—	—	—	—	—	—	—	5–1	—	—	—	—	—	—	—	—	—	4–0
Deportivo La Guaira	—	—	—	—	0–1	—	—	—	—	—	—	—	—	—	2–0	—	2–2	—	—
Deportivo Lara	3–1	—	—	—	—	—	—	2–0	—	—	—	—	—	—	—	—	—	—	2–1
Deportivo Táchira	0–0	—	—	—	—	—	—	—	—	—	—	2–1	—	—	—	—	—	0–2	—
Estudiantes de Mérida	—	—	2–1	4–0	—	—	—	—	—	—	2–1	—	—	—	—	—	—	—	—
GV Maracay	—	—	—	—	—	—	—	—	—	—	—	—	1–2	—	—	—	0–0	—	—
LALA	—	—	—	—	—	1–2	—	—	—	—	—	—	—	1–1	—	0–1	—	—	—
Metropolitanos	—	1–3	—	—	—	—	—	—	—	2–1	—	—	3–0	—	—	—	—	—	—
Mineros de Guayana	—	—	0–1	0–1	—	—	—	—	—	—	—	—	—	—	—	—	—	—	—
Monagas	—	—	—	—	—	—	—	—	—	3–0	—	—	—	—	2–0	—	2–1	—	—
Portuguesa	—	—	—	—	—	—	—	—	0–0	—	—	—	1–0	—	—	—	—	—	2–2
Trujillanos	—	—	—	—	0–0	—	0–0	—	—	—	—	—	—	—	1–0	—	—	—	—
Yaracuyanos	—	—	0–0	—	—	—	—	—	2–1	—	—	—	0–2	—	—	—	—	—	—
Zamora	—	1–0	—	—	—	—	2–1	—	—	—	—	3–1	—	—	—	2–0	—	—	—
Zulia	—	—	—	2–1	—	—	—	—	—	—	2–1	—	—	—	—	—	—	—	—

Source: Liga FUTVE, Soccerway
Legend: Blue = home team win; Yellow = draw; Red = away team win.

== Torneo de Normalización ==
=== Group stage ===
The 17 teams were drawn into two groups: one group of nine teams, hosted in Puerto Cabello and Valencia, and one group of eight teams, hosted in Barinas. The top teams in each group advanced to the Final to decide the league champions, the group runners-up decided their starting round in the Copa Libertadores qualifying stages, and the third and fourth placed teams qualified for the Copa Sudamericana. The draw was held on 18 September 2020.

==== Group A ====
Group A was played at La Bombonerita in Puerto Cabello and Estadio Misael Delgado in Valencia.

===== Standings =====
Pos	Team	Pld	W	D	L	GF	GA	GD	Pts	Qualification
1	Deportivo La Guaira	16	10	3	3	25	11	+14	33	Advance to the Final and qualification for the Copa Libertadores group stage
2	Deportivo Lara	16	9	5	2	27	9	+18	32	Advance to the third place play-off and qualification for the Copa Libertadores qualifying stages
3	Academia Puerto Cabello (H)	16	6	8	2	22	15	+7	26	Qualification for the Copa Sudamericana first stage
4	Mineros de Guayana	16	7	3	6	24	24	0	24	Qualification for the Copa Sudamericana first stage
5	Yaracuyanos	16	5	6	5	18	19	−1	21	
6	Estudiantes de Mérida	16	5	5	6	25	25	0	20	
7	Trujillanos	16	5	3	8	19	25	−6	18	
8	Atlético Venezuela	16	4	3	9	17	28	−11	15	
9	Carabobo (H)	16	0	6	10	14	35	−21	6	

Source: Soccerway
Rules for classification: 1) Points; 2) Goal difference; 3) Goals scored.
(H) Hosts

===== Results =====
Home \ Away	APC	AVE	CBO	DLG	LAR	ESM	MIN	TRU	YAR
Academia Puerto Cabello	—	2–2	2–1	1–1	0–0	2–2	0–0	1–3	1–0
Atlético Venezuela	2–2	—	2–0	2–3	0–3	2–1	3–1	1–0	0–1
Carabobo	0–3	0–0	—	0–2	0–3	2–2	2–2	2–2	0–2
Deportivo La Guaira	3–0	2–0	2–0	—	1–0	1–1	0–1	1–2	2–1
Deportivo Lara	0–0	4–0	2–2	1–0	—	1–2	1–1	3–0	3–0
Estudiantes de Mérida	1–2	2–0	3–2	1–2	0–1	—	3–2	1–2	1–2
Mineros	0–2	2–1	4–2	0–2	1–2	2–3	—	2–1	3–1
Trujillanos	0–4	1–0	3–0	0–2	1–2	1–1	1–2	—	1–2
Yaracuyanos	0–0	4–2	1–1	1–1	1–1	1–1	0–1	1–1	—

Source: Soccerway
Legend: Blue = home team win; Yellow = draw; Red = away team win.

==== Group B ====
Group B was played at Estadio Agustín Tovar in Barinas.

===== Standings =====
Pos	Team	Pld	W	D	L	GF	GA	GD	Pts	Qualification
1	Deportivo Táchira	14	9	4	1	20	8	+12	31	Advance to the Final and qualification for the Copa Libertadores group stage
2	Caracas	14	9	3	2	25	9	+16	30	Advance to the third place play-off and qualification for the Copa Libertadores qualifying stages
3	Aragua	14	6	4	4	16	13	+3	22	Qualification for the Copa Sudamericana first stage
4	Metropolitanos	14	5	6	3	20	17	+3	21	Qualification for the Copa Sudamericana first stage
5	Zamora (H)	14	5	2	7	15	14	+1	17	
6	GV Maracay	14	3	4	7	11	24	−13	13	
7	Portuguesa	14	3	2	9	9	23	−14	11	
8	Monagas	14	3	1	10	15	23	−8	10	

Source: Soccerway
Rules for classification: 1) Points; 2) Goal difference; 3) Goals scored.
(H) Hosts

===== Results =====
Home \ Away	ARA	CAR	TAC	GVM	MET	MON	POR	ZAM
Aragua	—	0–0	0–1	1–1	0–1	3–2	1–0	3–1
Caracas	0–1	—	0–0	6–2	2–1	1–0	2–0	1–0
Deportivo Táchira	1–1	1–1	—	0–0	1–0	3–2	3–0	0–3
GV Maracay	0–2	0–4	0–3	—	1–1	2–1	0–1	1–0
Metropolitanos	2–2	2–1	0–3	4–2	—	2–2	1–1	0–0
Monagas	1–0	1–2	1–2	0–2	1–2	—	1–0	1–0
Portuguesa	1–2	0–2	0–1	0–0	0–3	3–2	—	2–1
Zamora	2–0	1–3	0–1	1–0	1–1	1–0	4–1	—

Source: Soccerway
Legend: Blue = home team win; Yellow = draw; Red = away team win.

=== Third place play-off ===
The winner qualified for the Copa Libertadores second stage, while the loser qualified for the first stage of said competition.

15 December 2020
16:30 UTC−4

Deportivo Lara	1–0	Caracas
Bueno 90+3'	Report

Estadio Agustín Tovar, Barinas
Referee: Ángel Arteaga

=== Final ===
The final was a single match at a neutral venue, played on 15 December 2020. The winners were crowned as the league champions.

15 December 2020
19:00 UTC−4

Deportivo La Guaira	2–0	Deportivo Táchira
García 40'; Ortiz 76'	Report

Estadio Misael Delgado, Valencia
Referee: José Argote

== Aggregate table ==
Pos	Team	Pld	W	D	L	GF	GA	GD	Pts	PPG	Qualification
1	Deportivo Táchira	14	9	4	1	20	8	+12	31	2.21	Qualification for the Copa Libertadores group stage
2	Caracas	14	9	3	2	25	9	+16	30	2.14	Qualification for the Copa Libertadores first stage
3	Deportivo La Guaira (C)	16	10	3	3	25	11	+14	33	2.06	Qualification for the Copa Libertadores group stage
4	Deportivo Lara	16	9	5	2	27	9	+18	32	2.00	Qualification for the Copa Libertadores second stage
5	Academia Puerto Cabello (H)	16	6	8	2	22	15	+7	26	1.63	Qualification for the Copa Sudamericana first stage
6	Aragua	14	6	4	4	16	13	+3	22	1.57	Qualification for the Copa Sudamericana first stage
7	Metropolitanos	14	5	6	3	20	17	+3	21	1.50	Qualification for the Copa Sudamericana first stage
8	Mineros de Guayana	16	7	3	6	24	24	0	24	1.50	Qualification for the Copa Sudamericana first stage
9	Yaracuyanos	16	5	6	5	18	19	−1	21	1.31	
10	Estudiantes de Mérida	16	5	5	6	25	25	0	20	1.25	
11	Zamora (H)	14	5	2	7	15	14	+1	17	1.21	
12	Trujillanos	16	5	3	8	19	25	−6	18	1.13	
13	Atlético Venezuela	16	4	3	9	17	28	−11	15	0.94	
14	GV Maracay	14	3	4	7	11	24	−13	13	0.93	
15	Portuguesa	14	3	2	9	9	23	−14	11	0.79	
16	Monagas	14	3	1	10	15	23	−8	10	0.71	
17	Carabobo (H)	16	0	6	10	14	35	−21	6	0.38	

Source: Soccerway
Rules for classification: 1) Points per game; 2) Goal difference; 3) Goals scored.
(C) Champions; (H) Hosts

== Top goalscorers ==
Rank	Player	Club	Goals
1	(Venezuela) Richard Blanco	Mineros	8
1	(Venezuela) Edder Farías	Atlético Venezuela	8
3	(Venezuela) José Rivas	Estudiantes de Mérida	7
3	(Venezuela) Aquiles Ocanto	Deportivo La Guaira	7
3	(Venezuela) Matías Lacava	Academia Puerto Cabello	7
3	(Venezuela) José Hernández	Trujillanos	7
7	(Venezuela) Joel Infante	GV Maracay	6
8	(Venezuela) Daniel Pérez	Metropolitanos	5
8	(Venezuela) Freddy Vargas	Deportivo Lara	5
8	(Venezuela) Joantony Carmona	Trujillanos	5
8	(Panama) Ángel Sánchez	Deportivo Lara	5
8	(Venezuela) Brayan Hurtado	Mineros	5
8	(Venezuela) Charlis Ortiz	Deportivo La Guaira	5

Source: Liga FUTVE
