= List of football stadiums in Venezuela =

The following is a list of football stadiums in Venezuela, ordered by capacity. Currently all stadiums with a capacity of more than 1,000 are included.

== Current stadiums ==
#	Image	Stadium	Capacity	City	Home team
1		Estadio Monumental de Maturín	52,000	Maturín	Monagas Sport Club
2		Estadio Metropolitano de Fútbol de Lara	47,913	Barquisimeto	Unión Lara
3		Estadio Metropolitano de Mérida	42,200	Mérida	Estudiantes de Mérida FC
4		Polideportivo Cachamay	41,600	Ciudad Guayana	Atlético Club Mineros de Guayana
5		Estadio José Pachencho Romero	40,800	Maracaibo	Unión Atlético Maracaibo
6		Estadio Polideportivo de Pueblo Nuevo	38,755	San Cristóbal	Deportivo Táchira Fútbol Club
7		Estadio José Antonio Anzoátegui	37,485	Puerto la Cruz	Deportivo Anzoátegui
8		Estadio Agustín Tovar	29,800	Barinas	Zamora Fútbol Club
9		Estadio José Alberto Pérez	25,000	Valera	Trújillanos Fútbol Club
10		Estadio Olímpico	24,900	Caracas	Caracas Fútbol Club, Deportivo La Guaira, Metropolitanos and Universidad Central
11		Estadio General José Antonio Paez	18,000	Acarigua	Portuguesa Fútbol Club
12		Polideportivo Félix Velázquez	15,000	Cumaná	Sucre Fútbol Club
13		Estadio Olímpico Hermanos Ghersi Páez	14,000	Maracay	Aragua Fútbol Club
14		Estadio Guillermo Soto Rosa	14,000	Mérida	Universidad de Los Andes Fútbol Club
15		Estadio Rafael Calles Pinto	13.000	Guanare	Llaneros de Guanare
16		Estadio 12 de Febrero	12,785	El Vigía	Atlético El Vigía Fútbol Club
17		Estadio Farid Richa	12,480	Barquisimeto	Unión Lara
18		Estadio Misael Delgado	10,400	Valencia	Carabobo Fútbol Club, Gran Valencia Fútbol Club, Hermandad Gallega Fútbol Club
19		Estadio Brígido Iriarte	10,000	Caracas	Atlético Venezuela, Estudiantes de Caracas and Metropolitanos
20		Estadio Florentino Oropeza	10,000	San Felipe	Yaracuyanos Fútbol Club
21		Estadio Pedro Chávez	10,000	San Antonio	Club Deportivo San Antonio, Real Frontera Sport Club
22		Estadio Héroes de San Mateo	10,000	San Mateo	None
23		Estadio Alexander Bottini	10,000	Maturín	Monagas Sport Club “B”
24		Estadio Antonio José de Sucre	10,000	Puerto Ayacucho	Tucanes de Amazonas Fútbol Club
25		Estadio Reinaldo Melo	8,000	Barinas	Hermanos Colmenarez
26		La Bombonerita	7,500	Puerto Cabello	Academia Puerto Cabello
27		Estadio Giuseppe Antonelli	7,500	Maracay	Unión Atlético Aragua
28		Estadio Orlando Medina	5,000	Colón	Rumbo a la Excelencia Deportiva Internacional Colón
29		Ciudad Deportiva	4,500	Pampatar	Margarita Fútbol Club
30		Cocodrilos Sport Park	3,500	Caracas	Caracas Fútbol Club
31		Polideportivo Máximo Viloria	3,500	Barquisimeto	None

== See also ==
- List of South American stadiums by capacity
- Lists of stadiums
- Football in Venezuela
