= List of football clubs in Venezuela =

This is a List of football clubs in Venezuela. Football in Venezuela (association football) is one of Venezuela's most popular sports.

== Primera División ==
=== 2023 Venezuelan Primera División teams ===
Club	Home city	Stadium	First stage position last season	Founded
Academia Puerto Cabello	Puerto Cabello	Complejo Deportivo Socialista	7th	2011
Angostura	Ciudad Bolívar	Ricardo Tulio Maya	Segunda División	2007
Carabobo	Valencia	Misael Delgado	4th	1997
Caracas	Caracas	Olímpico de la UCV	11th	1967
Deportivo La Guaira	Caracas	Olímpico de la UCV	5th	2008
Deportivo Rayo Zuliano	Maracaibo	José Pachencho Romero	Segunda División	2021
Deportivo Táchira	San Cristóbal	Polideportivo de Pueblo Nuevo	6th	1974
Estudiantes de Mérida	Mérida	Metropolitano de Mérida	9th	1971
Hermanos Colmenarez	Barinas	Agustín Tovar	8th	2015
Metropolitanos	Caracas	Olímpico de la UCV	2nd (Final winners)	2012
Mineros de Guayana	Ciudad Guayana	Polideportivo Cachamay	13th	1981
Monagas	Maturín	Monumental de Maturín	3rd (Final runner-ups)	1987
Portuguesa	Acarigua	General José Antonio Paez	10th	1972
Universidad Central	Caracas	Olímpico de la UCV	15th	1950
Zamora	Barinas	Agustín Tovar	1st	2002

== Best results in CONMEBOL competitions ==
- Copa Libertadores
  - Quarter-finals (4): 1994, 1999, 2004, 2009

Season	Club	Opponent	Aggregate score
1994	Minervén	(Argentina) Vélez Sarsfield	0–2
1999	Estudiantes de Mérida	(Paraguay) Cerro Porteño	3–4
2004	Deportivo Táchira	(Brazil) São Paulo	1–7
2009	Caracas	(Brazil) Grêmio	0–1

- Copa Sudamericana
  - Quarter-finals (1): 2019

Season	Club	Opponent	Aggregate score
2019	Zulia (Note: Defunct club.)	(Argentina) Colón	1–4
