= Jesús Alonso Cabello =

Venezuelan football manager

Personal information
- Full name: Jesús Alonso Cabello Rojas
- Date of birth: 12 November 1982 (age 43)
- Place of birth: Ciudad Bolívar, Venezuela

Managerial career
- Years: Team
- Mineros (youth)
- 2010–2011: Caroní (youth)
- 2011–2012: Estudiantes de Caroní (assistant)
- 2015: Diamantes de Guayana
- 2016: Academia Puerto Cabello (women)
- 2017: Academia Puerto Cabello (youth)
- 2018: GV Maracay
- 2019: LALA (assistant)
- 2019–2020: Yaracuyanos
- 2021: Mineros
- 2022: Academia Anzoátegui
- 2023: Mineros (assistant)
- 2023: Mineros (interim)
- 2023: Mineros (interim)
- 2023: Mineros
- 2024: Bolívar SC

Jesús Alonso Cabello Rojas (born 12 November 1982) is a Venezuelan football manager.

== Career ==
Born in Ciudad Bolívar, Cabello was a youth manager at Mineros de Guayana and Caroní before being appointed assistant manager of Estudiantes de Caroní in 2011. His first managerial experience occurred in 2015, with Diamantes de Guayana.

In 2016, Cabello was appointed manager of Academia Puerto Cabello's women team. In 2018, after a year in the club's youth sides, he took over Gran Valencia Maracay.

On 18 July 2019, after again being assistant at LALA, Cabello was named in charge of Yaracuyanos. He won the Segunda División in his first season, and missed out a qualification to the Copa Sudamericana in his second. On 15 December 2020, he resigned.

On 10 March 2021, Cabello returned to Mineros, being named first team manager. On 2 August, he left the club in a mutual consent, and spent the 2022 season in charge of second division side Academia Anzoátegui.

Cabello returned to Mineros in 2023, initially as an assistant. He was named interim manager on 14 April, after Tony Franco left, and returned to his previous role on 6 May after the appointment of Jorge Luis Bernal. On 22 May, after Bernal resigned, he was again interim.

== Honours ==
Yaracuyanos

- Venezuelan Segunda División: 2019
