= Jhon Pinto =

Venezuelan footballer (born 1980)

Personal information
- Full name: Jhon Alexander Pinto Sánchez
- Date of birth: 4 January 1980 (age 46)
- Place of birth: San Felipe, Venezuela
- Height: 1.72 m (5 ft 8 in)
- Position: Midfielder

Senior career*
| Years | Team | Apps | (Gls) |
| 2006 | Mineros | 1 | (0) |
| 2007 | Carabobo | 6 | (0) |
| 2008–2009 | Portuguesa | 24 | (1) |
| 2009–2010 | Yaracuyanos | 20 | (1) |
| 2014 | Yaracuyanos | 4 | (0) |
| Total | | 55 | (2) |

Managerial career
- 2016–2017: Yaracuy
- 2018: Universidad Central (youth)
- 2019–2022: Yaracuyanos (youth)
- 2023–2024: Yaracuyanos (assistant)
- 2024–2025: Yaracuyanos
- * Club domestic league appearances and goals

Jhon Alexander Pinto Sánchez (born 4 January 1980) is a Venezuelan football manager and former player who played as a midfielder.

== Playing career ==
Born in San Felipe, Pinto played as a senior for Primera División sides Mineros, Carabobo, Portuguesa and Yaracuyanos. He left the latter side in 2010, spending a period away from football before returning in January 2014.

== Managerial career ==
After retiring in 2014, Pinto became the manager of Tercera División side Yaracuy in 2016, achieving promotion as champions. He left the club in August 2017, and later worked as an under-17 manager of Universidad Central in the following year.

Pinto subsequently returned to his former club Yaracuyanos, working as a youth and assistant manager in the following years. He was named manager of the club in September 2024, after Lenin Bastidas left, and led the club back to the top tier after winning the Segunda División.

== Honours ==
Yaracuy

- Venezuelan Tercera División: 2016

Yaracuyanos

- Venezuelan Segunda División: 2024
