= Rafael Blancq =

Argentine footballer (born 1998)

Personal information
- Full name: Rafael Alfredo Blancq Cazaux
- Date of birth: 16 February 1998 (age 28)
- Place of birth: Curuzú Cuatiá, Argentina
- Height: 1.74 m (5 ft 9 in)
- Position: Winger

Team information
- Current team: Diagoras

Youth career
- CSyD Victoria
- Boca Juniors
- Argentinos Juniors

Senior career*
Years	Team	Apps	(Gls)
2020–2021	Argentinos Juniors	0	(0)
2020–2021	→ GV Maracay (loan)	15	(1)
2021–2023	Ierapetra	40	(2)
2023–2024	Apollon Kalamarias	0	(0)
2024–2025	Diagoras	7	(0)
2025	Niki Volos	1	(0)
2025–2026	Marko	3	(0)
2026	Ilioupoli	9	(2)
2026–	Diagoras		
- * Club domestic league appearances and goals as of 21 April 2026

Rafael Alfredo Blancq Cazaux (born 16 February 1998) is an Argentine professional footballer who plays as a winger for Gamma Ethniki club Diagoras.

== Career ==
Blancq is a product of the Argentinos Juniors youth system, having previously progressed through local team CSyD Victoria and Boca Juniors. In January 2020, Blancq completed a loan move to Venezuela with GV Maracay. He made his professional debut for the newly promoted Primera División outfit on 8 February, coming off the bench during a goalless draw against Yaracuyanos at the Estadio Florentino Oropeza. His first start arrived on 22 February versus Metropolitanos, while the winger scored his first senior goal in a 6–2 defeat to Caracas on 23 November.

== Career statistics ==
As of 24 November 2020.

Appearances and goals by club, season and competition
Club	Season	League			Cup		League Cup		Continental		Other		Total	
Club	Season	Division	Apps	Goals	Apps	Goals	Apps	Goals	Apps	Goals	Apps	Goals	Apps	Goals
Argentinos Juniors	2019–20	Argentine Primera División	0	0	0	0	0	0	0	0	0	0	0	0
GV Maracay (loan)	2020	Venezuelan Primera División	10	1	0	0	—		—		0	0	10	1
Career total			10	1	0	0	0	0	0	0	0	0	10	1
