= Carlos Suárez (footballer) =

Venezuelan footballer (born 1992)

Personal information
- Full name: Carlos Luis Suárez Mendoza
- Date of birth: 26 April 1992 (age 34)
- Place of birth: San Felipe, Venezuela
- Height: 1.73 m (5 ft 8 in)
- Position: Midfielder

Team information
- Current team: San Francisco
- Number: 17

Youth career
- Caracas

Senior career*
Years	Team	Apps	(Gls)
2011–2013	Caracas	15	(0)
2012–2013	→ Portuguesa (loan)	19	(0)
2013	Deportivo La Guaira	13	(2)
2014–2017	Carabobo	140	(8)
2018–2021	Monagas	48	(1)
2019	→ Curicó Unido (loan)	20	(0)
2021	Deportes Melipilla	15	(0)
2022	Caracas	24	(1)
2023	Anzoátegui	21	(1)
2025	San Antonio Bulo Bulo	7	(0)
2026	Portuguesa	9	(0)
2026–	San Francisco	3	(0)

International career^{‡}
2011	Venezuela U20	4	(0)
2016	Venezuela	1	(0)
- * Club domestic league appearances and goals as of 11 March 2026 ‡ National team caps and goals as of 5 June 2017

Carlos Luis Suárez Mendoza (born 26 April 1992) is a Venezuelan footballer who plays as a midfielder for San Francisco.

== Club career ==
Abroad, Suárez played for Chilean clubs Curicó Unido in 2019 and Deportes Melipilla in 2021.

In 2023, Suárez played for Academia Anzoátegui in the Venezuelan second level.

== International career ==
Suárez made his senior international debut in a 0–0 draw with Panama. He played 68 minutes before being replaced by Arquímedes Figuera.

== Career statistics ==
=== Club ===
As of 4 January 2019

Club performance		League		Cup		Continental		Total	
Club	Season	Apps	Goals	Apps	Goals	Apps	Goals	Apps	Goals
Venezuela		Primera División		Copa Venezuela		Continental		Total	
Caracas	2010–11	5	0	0	0	0	0	5	0
Caracas	2011–12	10	0	0	0	0	0	10	0
Total		15	0	0	0	0	0	15	0
Portuguesa	2012–13	19	0	0	0	0	0	19	0
Total		19	0	0	0	0	0	19	0
Deportivo La Guaira	2013–14	13	2	0	0	0	0	13	2
Total		13	2	0	0	0	0	13	2
Carabobo	2013–14	18	0	0	0	0	0	18	0
Carabobo	2014–15	34	3	0	0	0	0	34	3
Carabobo	2015	18	0	6	2	2 (Note: Appearances in the Copa Sudamericana)	0	26	2
Carabobo	2016	34	1	0	0	0	0	34	1
Carabobo	2017	36	4	4	0	2 (Note: Appearances in the Copa Libertadores)	0	42	4
Total		140	8	10	2	4	0	154	10
Monagas	2018	33	1	1	0	6	0	40	1
Total		33	1	1	0	6	0	40	1
Total	Venezuela	220	11	11	2	10	0	241	13
Total	Career total	220	11	11	2	10	0	241	13

=== International ===
As of match played 5 June 2017.

National team	Year	Apps	Goals
Venezuela	2016	1	0
Venezuela	2017	0	0
Total		1	0
