= Jolvis Sosa =

Venezuelan footballer (born 2000)

Personal information
- Full name: Jolvis Enrique Sosa Rodríguez
- Date of birth: 17 January 2000 (age 26)
- Place of birth: San Fernando de Apure, Venezuela
- Height: 1.65 m (5 ft 5 in)
- Position: Midfielder

Youth career
- FC San Fernando
- 2016–2017: Deportivo La Guaira

Senior career*
Years	Team	Apps	(Gls)
2017–2018	Deportivo La Guaira	1	(0)
2018	→ Gran Valencia (loan)		
2019	Monagas	1	(0)
2020–2022	Yaracuyanos	23	(1)
2023	Nueva Esparta FC	14	(1)
- * Club domestic league appearances and goals as of 19:34, 3 September 2023 (UTC)

Jolvis Enrique Sosa Rodríguez (born 17 January 2000) is a Venezuelan footballer who plays as a midfielder.

== Career ==
=== Early years ===
Sosa's uncles inspired him to want to play football. First his Uncle Gregorio, who he always saw playing with his neighbourhood team. Then Uncle Giancarlo, who motivated him to join his first team, FC San Fernando. "I had already turned 10 when I had my first real training session. That day marked my future. I convinced the coach by scoring a goal and giving several assists," Sosa revealed in an interview, who until that day had only played football at school and in his backyard.

=== Deportivo La Guaira ===
Sosa and FC San Fernando faced Deportivo La Guaira in 2015 and beat them. After the game, La Guaira immediately made contact with Sosa, took him to Carabobo and six months later, he ended up signing with the club.

He played a lot of U20 games for La Guaira, before he got his professional debut for the club in the Venezuelan Primera División against Caracas FC on 23 July 2017, when he came on as a substitute for Juan Carlos Azócar in the 91st minute. This was his first and last official appearance for the club.

In 2018, Sosa was loaned out to Gran Valencia in the Venezuelan second division, allegedly because he was not a part of La Guira's plans. Later in that year, Sosa also attended a Summer Course at Marcet Football University in Barcelona, in order to experience first-hand contact with Spanish football.

=== Monagas ===
In February 2019, Sosa moved to Monagas. His first game came on 2 September 2019 against Academia Puerto Cabello in the Venezuelan Primera División. In his second game for the club and first game in the starting lineup, against Angostura FC in the Copa Venezuela, he scored his first goal.

=== Later clubs ===
On 2 February 2020, Sosa joined fellow league club Yaracuyanos. Sosa played 12 games in his first season at the club. In 2023, Sosa played for Venezuelan Segunda División side Nueva Esparta FC.

== International career ==
In 2016, Sosa was summoned in the Venezuelan U17 national team, but a knee injury prevented him from maintaining any sort of continuity with the team.
