= Gabriel Vargas (footballer, born 2000) =

Venezuelan footballer

Personal information
- Full name: Gabriel Jaime Alejandro Vargas Díaz
- Date of birth: 15 September 2000 (age 26)
- Place of birth: Coro, Venezuela
- Height: 1.73 m (5 ft 8 in)
- Position: Left winger

Youth career
- Carabobo

Senior career*
Years	Team	Apps	(Gls)
2018	Carabobo	11	(1)
2019	Monagas	3	(0)
2020	Gran Valencia	2	(0)
2021	Mineros de Guayana	18	(0)
2022–2023	Carabobo	33	(0)
2023	→ Héroes de Falcón (loan)	7	(0)
2024	Anzoátegui	13	(2)
- * Club domestic league appearances and goals as of 22:25, 26 August 2024 (UTC)

Gabriel Jaime Alejandro Vargas Díaz (born 15 September 2000), often also referred to as Gabriel 'Toretico' Vargas is a Venezuelan footballer who plays as a left winger.

== Career ==
=== Club career ===
Until Vargas was 13 years old, he was playing baseball, beside football. He is a product of Carabobo, where he went through the youth ranks of the club, all the way up to the first team, where he made his debut in a Venezuelan Primera División against Zulia FC on 23 February 2018. His first professional goal came on 26 March 2018 against Estudiantes de Mérida. He made 11 appearances in the 2018 season.

In the 2019 season, Vargas moved to Monagas, while he played for Gran Valencia in 2020. In 2021, he signed for Mineros de Guayana.

On 10 January 2022, Vargas returned to Carabobo on a deal until the end of 2023. In July 2023, Vargas joined Héroes de Falcón on a loan deal.

Ahead of the 2024 season, Vargas joined Anzoátegui FC. He left the club in August 2024.
