= Venezuelan Segunda División B =

Segunda División B
- Founded: 2005
- Folded: 2012
- Country: Venezuela
- Confederation: CONMEBOL
- Number of clubs: 24
- Promotion to: Segunda División
- Relegation to: Tercera División
- Domestic cup: Copa Venezuela
- Website: FVF's website

Segunda División B was the third tier of the Venezuelan football league system.

The Venezuelan third division was established in 2005.

== List of champions ==
Ed.	Season	Champion	Runner-up	Third Place
1	2005–06	Zulia	Iberoamericano	Atlético Turén; Estrella Roja
2	2006–07	Zulia	Iberoamericano	UCLA
3	2007–08	Yaracuyanos	Atlético Piar	Deportivo Táchira B
4	2008–09	San Antonio	Fundación Cesarger	Deportivo Táchira B
5	2009–10	Loteria de Táchira	Minasoro	Unión Atlético Aragua
6	2010–11	Guaraní	Deportivo Anzoátegui B	Deportivo Táchira B
7	2011–12	Universidad de Los Andes	Real Anzoátegui	Caracas B

== Titles by Team ==
Club	Titles	Runners-up	Seasons won	Seasons runner-up
Zulia	2	—	2005–06, 2006–07	—
Universidad de Los Andes	1	—	2011–12	—
Yaracuyanos	1	—	2007–08	—
Guaraní	1	—	2010–11	—
Loteria de Táchira	1	—	2009–10	—
San Antonio	1	—	2008–09	—
Iberoamericano	—	2	—	2005–06, 2006–07
Atlético Pilar	—	1	—	2007–08
Deportivo Anzoátegui B	—	1	—	2010–11
Fundación Cesarger	—	1	—	2008–09
Minasoro	—	1	—	2009–10
Real Anzoátegui	—	1	—	2011–12
