= Johan Moreno =

Venezuelan footballer (born 1991)

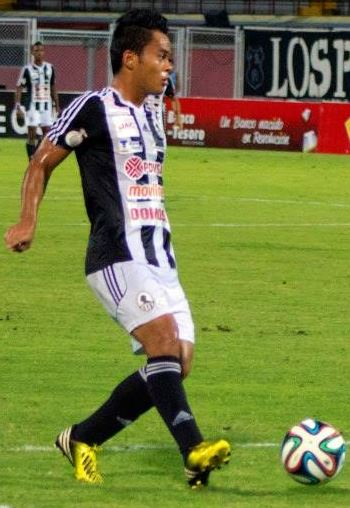
- Johan with Zamora in 2016

Personal information
- Full name: Johan Orlando Moreno Vivas
- Date of birth: 10 June 1991 (age 35)
- Place of birth: Ureña, Venezuela
- Height: 1.70 m (5 ft 7 in)
- Position: Winger

Team information
- Current team: Portuguesa
- Number: 11

Senior career*
Years	Team	Apps	(Gls)
2009–2012	Yaracuyanos	78	(13)
2012–2013	Atlético El Vigía	9	(1)
2013–2014	Yaracuyanos	43	(7)
2014–2016	Zamora	66	(19)
2016–2017	Deportes Antofagasta	1	(0)
2017	Carabobo FC	8	(2)
2017	Atlético Venezuela	13	(4)
2018	Deportivo Táchira	29	(7)
2019	Ñublense	14	(3)
2020-2021	Metropolitanos	44	(8)
2022	Deportivo Lara	31	(5)
2023-2024	Portuguesa	50	(14)
2025	Estudiantes	20	(1)
2026-	Portuguesa	5	(1)

International career
2016–	Venezuela	1	(0)
- * Club domestic league appearances and goals as of 11 March 2026

Johan Moreno (born 10 June 1991) is a Venezuelan footballer. Moreno currently plays for Portuguesa, and made one appearance for the Venezuela national football team.
