= Marco Bustillo =

Venezuelan footballer (born 1996)

Personal information
- Full name: Marco Antonio Bustillo Benítez
- Date of birth: 1 August 1996 (age 30)
- Place of birth: San Fernando, Venezuela
- Height: 6 ft 3 in (1.91 m)
- Position: Forward

Team information
- Current team: Portuguesa
- Number: 19

Youth career
- Carabobo

Senior career*
Years	Team	Apps	(Gls)
2017–2018	Carabobo	15	(0)
2019–2024	Metropolitanos	71	(14)
2022	→ UCV (loan)	11	(2)
2023	→ Academia Puerto Cabello (loan)	6	(1)
2025	Azuriz	12	(0)
2025	Academia Puerto Cabello	3	(0)
2026–	Portuguesa	4	(0)
- * Club domestic league appearances and goals as of 11 March 2026

Marco Antonio Bustillo Benítez (born 1 August 1996) is a Venezuelan professional footballer who plays as a forward for Venezuelan Primera División side Portuguesa.

== Club career ==
Born in San Fernando, Bustillo began his career with Primera División side Carabobo. He made his professional debut for the club on 27 August 2017 against Atlético Venezuela. He came off the bench as a 79th-minute substitute for Luis Mago as Carabobo won 3–1. After spending two seasons with the club, Bustillo left and signed with Metropolitanos, another Primera División side. He made his debut for the Metropolitanos on 16 March 2019 in the Copa Venezuela against Estudiantes de Caracas. Bustillo started and played the whole match as Metropolitanos fell 0–1.

Bustillo scored his first professional goal on 16 November 2019 in the league against Deportivo Táchira. His goal in the 5th minute was the first in a 2–0 victory. He then scored his second goal in his club's opening match of the 2020 season on 31 January 2020 against Aragua.

== Career statistics ==
=== Club ===
As of match played 8 March 2020

Appearances and goals by club, season and competition
Club	Season	League			Cup		Continental		Total	
Club	Season	Division	Apps	Goals	Apps	Goals	Apps	Goals	Apps	Goals
Carabobo	2017	Venezuelan Primera División	6	0	2	0	—	—	8	0
Carabobo	2018	Venezuelan Primera División	9	0	0	0	—	—	9	0
Carabobo	Total		15	0	2	0	0	0	17	0
Metropolitanos	2019	Venezuelan Primera División	4	1	3	0	—	—	7	1
Metropolitanos	2020	Venezuelan Primera División	6	4	0	0	—	—	6	4
Metropolitanos	Total		10	5	3	0	0	0	13	5
Career total			25	5	5	0	0	0	30	5
