= Juan Camilo Pérez =

Venezuelan footballer (born 1998)

Personal information
- Full name: Juan Camilo Pérez Vasco
- Date of birth: 22 December 1998 (age 27)
- Place of birth: Caracas, Venezuela
- Height: 1.75 m (5 ft 9 in)
- Position: Midfielder

Team information
- Current team: Carabobo
- Number: 8

Youth career
- Academia Franco Rizzi
- UCV
- Colegio San Agustín
- 2013–2017: Atlético Venezuela

Senior career*
Years	Team	Apps	(Gls)
2014–2017	Atlético Venezuela B		
2014–2017	Atlético Venezuela	3	(0)
2018	Deportivo La Guaira B		
2018–2019	Deportivo La Guaira	12	(0)
2019–2020	Deportivo Petare		
2021	Carabobo	23	(0)
2022	Breiðablik	0	(0)
2023–	Carabobo	79	(2)
- * Club domestic league appearances and goals as of 13:25, 2 July 2025 (UTC)

Juan Camilo Pérez Vasco (born 22 December 1998) is a Venezuelan professional footballer who plays as a midfielder for Carabobo.

== Club career ==
Born in Caracas, Pérez played for Academia Franco Rizzi, UCV, Colegio San Agustín and Atlético Venezuela as a youth. He scored his first senior goal with the first team debut at the age of 15, netting the winner in a 1–0 win over Metropolitanos on 17 September 2014, for the year's Copa Venezuela.

In the following years, Pérez alternated between the first team (playing three Primera División matches in 2016), the reserves (in Segunda División) and the under-20s of Atlético. He left the club in January 2018, joining Deportivo La Guaira but being initially a member of the B-team in Tercera División.

After featuring rarely with the main squad of La Guaira, Pérez signed for Deportivo Petare in the second division on 15 July 2019. On 6 March 2021, he returned to the top tier after agreeing to a deal with Carabobo.

Pérez quickly established himself as a first-choice at Carabobo, but left the club to move abroad on 3 January 2022, signing for Breiðablik in Iceland. At his new side, he suffered a knee injury which prevented him to play, and returned to Carabobo on 22 November 2022.

On 25 August 2024, after helping Carabobo to win the 2024 Apertura tournament, Pérez renewed his contract with the club until the end of 2025.

== International career ==
On 2 November 2015, Pérez received a call-up to the Venezuela national under-20 team after Jorge Corona was cut due to injury.

== Honours ==
Carabobo

- Venezuelan Primera División: 2024 Apertura
