= Henry Meléndez =

Venezuelan football manager

Personal information
- Full name: Henry Antonio Meléndez Sánchez
- Date of birth: 2 July 1984 (age 42)
- Place of birth: Caracas, Venezuela
- Position: Left back

Senior career*
Years	Team	Apps	(Gls)
- Deportivo Gulima

Managerial career
- Deportivo Gulima (youth)
- 2013–2014: Deportivo La Guaira (youth)
- 2015–2016: Atlético Venezuela (youth)
- 2016: Deportivo Petare (assistant)
- 2017–2018: Atlético Venezuela (youth)
- 2019: Caracas B
- 2019–2020: Atlético Venezuela
- 2021–2022: Zulia
- 2022: Caracas
- 2023–2024: Caracas U21
- 2024: Caracas
- 2024–2026: Caracas U21
- 2026: Caracas (interim)
- 2026: Caracas
- * Club domestic league appearances and goals

Henry Antonio Meléndez Sánchez (born 2 July 1984) is a Venezuelan football manager.

== Career ==
Born in Caracas, Meléndez started his career with Deportivo Gulima, a club focused on youth development, and worked for the side for ten years. He then was in charge of Deportivo La Guaira and Atlético Venezuela's youth categories before being named assistant manager of Enrique García at Deportivo Petare in 2016.

Meléndez returned to Atlético Venezuela and its youth setup in 2017, remaining for two years before joining Caracas, where he was in charge of the reserve side. On 19 September 2019, he returned to his previous club after being named first team manager, in the place of Jaime de la Pava.

On 31 October 2020, Meléndez left Atlético on a mutual agreement. On 16 August of the following year, he took over Zulia in the place of Frank Flores.

On 15 April 2022, Meléndez was sacked by Zulia. On 21 June, he returned to Caracas after being named youth coordinator, but was named manager on 19 September as Francesco Stifano was sacked.

Meléndez subsequently returned to his previous coordinator role, and later took over the under-21 squad. On 31 March 2024, he replaced Leonardo González at the helm of the first team, but returned to his previous role on 6 July after the appointment of Fernando Aristeguieta.

Again an interim after Aristeguieta resigned in April 2026, Meléndez was confirmed as manager of Caracas on 2 June, but left by mutual consent on 15 August.
