= Football in Venezuela =

- Country: Venezuela
- Governing body: Federación Venezolana de Fútbol
- National team: Venezuela

National competitions
- FIFA World Cup; Confederations Cup; Copa América

Club competitions
- List: League: Liga FUTVE; Cups: Copa Venezuela

International competitions
- FIFA Club World Cup; Copa Libertadores; Copa Sudamericana

Football is a widely practiced and popular sport in Venezuela, although the sport has lagged behind baseball in popularity. Approximately 60% of the people in Venezuela are considered association football fans. The country has proven one of the biggest underachievers in CONMEBOL and was formerly known as the Cenicienta of the region.

== History ==
The Federación Venezolana de Fútbol was established in 1926 following the creation of the Liga Venezolana in 1921. Professionalism was not established until 1957 with the Copa de Venezuela arriving two years later. Caracas Fútbol Club are the country's most successful club side. A second division was added in 1979 with a third added in 1999 and a fourth in 2006.

== Men's professional football ==
Level	Divisions
1st	Primera División; 18 clubs
	↓↑ 2 clubs
2nd	Segunda División; 20 clubs
	↓↑ 2 clubs
3rd	Tercera División; 39 clubs + 9 Reserve teams

== International ==
Venezuela national football team played their first game in 1938 and since then have been one of South America's weakest teams. Following Ecuador's qualification for the 2002 FIFA World Cup, Venezuela are now the only CONMEBOL member to have never appeared at a World Cup finals. However the team are no longer seen as pushovers and are now recognised as stern opposition. Their growing status was further demonstrated by their hosting of the Copa América 2007 during which they reached the quarter-finals. Furthermore, during the Copa América 2011, held in Argentina, they even improved this performance and reached the semifinals, after knocking out the Chilean team in the quarter-finals. They eventually lost in the semifinals against Paraguay.

An under-20 team, an under-17 team and a women's team also compete.

In 2017, Venezuela achieved one of its biggest ever feat in its football history, by becoming the fourth South American country after Brazil, Argentina and Uruguay, to reach the final of any FIFA competitions, when its U-20 side reached the final of 2017 FIFA U-20 World Cup for the first time. Chile would follow this step in the 2017 FIFA Confederations Cup later.

== Football stadiums in Venezuela ==
Stadiums with a capacity of 40,000 or higher are included.

#	Stadium	Capacity	City	Home team(s)
1	Estadio Monumental de Maturín	52,000	Maturín	Monagas Sport Club
2	Estadio Metropolitano de Fútbol de Lara	47,913	Barquisimeto	Unión Lara
3	Estadio Metropolitano de Mérida	42,200	Mérida	Estudiantes de Mérida FC
4	Centro Total de Entrenamiento Cachamay	41,600	Ciudad Guayana	Atlético Club Mineros de Guayana
5	Estadio José Pachencho Romero	40,800	Maracaibo	Unión Atlético Maracaibo

== Women's football in Venezuela ==
Football is growing in popularity in Venezuela, but many professional female players move to other countries to maintain their careers.

== Attendances ==
The Venezuelan top-flight football league clubs and their average home league attendance in 2018 are listed in the table below. The average league attendance was 2,619.

#	Club	Average
1	Caracas	5,082
2	Zamora	4,710
3	Deportivo Táchira	4,005
4	Estudiantes de Mérida	3,964
5	Monagas	3,870
6	Deportivo Lara	3,139
7	Zulia	2,625
8	Mineros de Guayana	2,361
9	Puerto Cabello	2,333
10	Carabobo	2,132
11	Trujillanos	2,066
12	Portuguesa	1,968
13	Aragua	1,867
14	Deportivo Anzoátegui	1,847
15	Deportivo La Guaira	1,796
16	Metropolitanos	1,264
17	Estudiantes de Caracas	1,243
18	Atlético Venezuela	881

== See also ==
- List of football stadiums in Venezuela
