= Tony Franco =

Venezuelan football manager

Personal information
- Full name: Antonio Franco López
- Date of birth: 28 August 1981 (age 45)
- Place of birth: Caracas, Venezuela

Team information
- Current team: Marítimo de La Guaira (manager)

Managerial career
- Years: Team
- 2013–2015: Mineros (assistant)
- 2015: Mineros
- 2015: Carabobo
- 2016: Caracas
- 2017: Aragua
- 2018: Atlético Venezuela
- 2019: Izarra (assistant)
- 2019: Izarra (interim)
- 2020: Carabobo
- 2020–2021: Izarra (assistant)
- 2021: Izarra (interim)
- 2021: Yaracuyanos
- 2022: Carabobo
- 2023: Mineros
- 2023: Monagas
- 2024–: Marítimo de La Guaira

Antonio "Tony" Franco López (born 28 August 1981) is a Venezuelan football manager, currently in charge of Marítimo de La Guaira.

== Career ==
Born in Caracas, Franco was an assistant of Richard Páez and Marcos Mathías at Mineros de Guayana before being appointed manager of the club in March 2015. In October of that year, he replaced Jhonny Ferreira at the helm of Carabobo.

On 28 November 2015, Franco was announced as manager of Caracas for the 2016 campaign. Sacked on 25 November, he was named at the helm of Aragua on 5 December.

On 25 March 2018, Franco was appointed manager of Atlético Venezuela, after agreeing to a contract until December 2019. He left the club on 5 November, and subsequently moved to Europe to study.

In July 2019, Franco joined Spanish club CD Izarra's coaching staff as an assistant of Unai Jáuregui. He was an interim manager for one match after Jáuregui left in October, but left the club on 14 December; the following day, he was appointed in charge of Carabobo back in his home country.

Franco left Carabobo on 29 October 2020, and subsequently returned to Izarra, again as an assistant. He was the latter's interim manager the following January, but left in April.

On 20 May 2021, Franco was appointed manager of Yaracuyanos, but resigned on 23 September. He returned to Carabobo on 4 July 2022, in the place of Kike García, but was himself dismissed on 7 October.

On 27 January 2023, Franco returned to Mineros, but left on a mutual agreement on 13 April. On 10 July, he was named manager of Monagas after Jhonny Ferreira was appointed the club's sporting director, leaving on 19 October as his contract would not be renewed.
