= Leonardo González =

Leonardo González may refer to:

- Leonardo González (Venezuelan footballer) (born 1972), Venezuelan football manager and former football defender
- Leonardo González (Costa Rican footballer) (born 1980), Costa Rican football left-back
