= César Urpín =

Venezuelan footballer (born 1994)

Personal information
- Full name: César José Urpín Díaz
- Date of birth: 14 August 1994 (age 32)
- Place of birth: Puerto la Cruz, Venezuela
- Height: 1.82 m (6 ft 0 in)
- Position: Right-back

Team information
- Current team: Portuguesa F.C.
- Number: 66

Senior career*
Years	Team	Apps	(Gls)
2012–2017	Atlético Venezuela C.F.	51	(4)
2016	→ Caracas F.C. (loan)	7	(0)
2017–2022	Aragua F.C.	114	(2)
2023	Deportivo La Guaira	8	(0)
2023–2024	Zamora F.C.	29	(0)
2025	Anzoátegui F.C.	7	(0)
2026–	Portuguesa F.C.	4	(0)

International career^{‡}
2011	Venezuela U17	3	(0)
- * Club domestic league appearances and goals as of 11 March 2026 ‡ National team caps and goals as of 24 March 2019

César José Urpín Díaz (born 14 August 1994) is a Venezuelan footballer who plays as a defender for Portuguesa F.C. in the Venezuelan Primera División.
