= Bladimir Morales =

Venezuelan football manager (born 1983)

Personal information
- Full name: Bladimir Alejandro Morales Duarte
- Date of birth: 9 April 1983 (age 43)
- Place of birth: San Cristóbal, Venezuela
- Height: 1.72 m (5 ft 8 in)
- Position: Midfielder

Team information
- Current team: Academia Puerto Cabello (reserves manager)

Senior career*
Years	Team	Apps	(Gls)
2004–2005	Trujillanos	54	(2)
2006–2008	Zamora	59	(1)
2008–2011	Deportivo Petare	69	(1)
2011–2013	Deportivo Lara	35	(0)
2013–2014	Caracas	21	(0)
2014	REDI Colón		
2015	Portuguesa	7	(0)
2015–2016	Gran Valencia		

Managerial career
- 2016–2021: Gran Valencia
- 2022–: Academia Puerto Cabello (reserves)
- 2022: Academia Puerto Cabello (interim)
- 2024: Academia Puerto Cabello (interim)
- 2025: Academia Puerto Cabello (interim)
- 2025: Academia Puerto Cabello (interim)
- * Club domestic league appearances and goals

Bladimir Alejandro Morales Duarte (born 9 April 1983) is a Venezuelan football manager and former player who played as a midfielder. He is the current manager of Academia Puerto Cabello's reserve team.

== Playing career ==
Born in San Cristóbal, Táchira, Morales made his professional debut with Trujillanos in the Primera División in 2004. He moved to Zamora in 2006, and was a regular starter before joining Deportivo Italia in 2008.

In 2011, Morales agreed to a contract with Deportivo Lara. He signed for Caracas on 5 June 2013, but stayed in the club for just a year before moving to Tercera División side REDI Colón.

On 26 December 2014, Morales joined Portuguesa back in the first division. He subsequently represented Segunda División's Gran Valencia Maracay, where he retired in 2016 at the age of 33.

== Managerial career ==
Immediately after retiring, Morales was appointed manager of his last club Gran Valencia. On 11 December 2017, after achieving promotion to the top tier, he renewed his contract until 2019.
