= Arnaldo Aranda =

Venezuelan football manager (born 1982)

Personal information
- Full name: Arnaldo del Valle Aranda Rodríguez
- Date of birth: 27 February 1982 (age 44)
- Place of birth: Puerto Ordaz, Venezuela
- Height: 1.76 m (5 ft 9 in)
- Position: Left-back

Team information
- Current team: Yaracuyanos (manager)

Youth career
- Mineros

Senior career*
Years	Team	Apps	(Gls)
2003–2004	Mineros		
2004–2005	Italmaracaibo	19	(0)
2005	Mineros		
2006–2007	Carabobo	26	(2)
2007–2010	Llaneros	54	(4)
2010–2011	Portuguesa		
2011–2012	El Vigía	28	(2)
2012–2014	Tucanes de Amazonas		
2014–2016	Trujillanos	8	(0)
2016	Tucanes de Amazonas	6	(0)
2017	Chicó de Guayana		
2017–2018	LALA		
2018	Deportivo JBL		

International career
2001	Venezuela U20		
2003–2004	Venezuela U23		

Managerial career
- 2019: Fundación AIFI (assistant)
- 2020–2021: LALA (assistant)
- 2022: Mineros (youth)
- 2023: Mineros (assistant)
- 2024–2025: Yaracuyanos (assistant)
- 2024: Yaracuyanos (interim)
- 2025–: Yaracuyanos
- * Club domestic league appearances and goals

Arnaldo del Valle Aranda Rodríguez (born 27 February 1982) is a Venezuelan football manager and former player who played as a left-back. He is the current manager of Yaracuyanos.

== Club career ==
Born in Puerto Ordaz, Aranda made his senior debut with Mineros before moving to Italmaracaibo in 2004. He returned to Mineros in the following year, and joined Carabobo in 2006.

In 2007, Aranda signed for Llaneros and remained at the club for three seasons before joining Portuguesa. In 2011, he agreed to a deal with El Vigía.

In 2014, after two years at Tucanes de Amazonas, Aranda moved to Trujillanos. On 10 June 2016, he was announced back at Tucanes.

On 17 June 2017, after a short period at Chicó de Guayana, Aranda joined LALA. On 18 July 2018, he signed for Deportivo JBL, and retired the following January, aged 36.

== International career ==
Aranda was a part of the Venezuela national under-20 team in the 2001 South American U-20 Championship, before featuring with the under-23s at the 2004 CONMEBOL Pre-Olympic Tournament. In July 2004, he was called up to the full side by manager for a non-FIFA friendly against Japan U23.

Aranda made his full international debut on 30 July 2004, coming on as a second-half substitute in the 4–0 loss at the Japan National Stadium.

== Managerial career ==
On 1 October 2019, Aranda joined the staff of Fundación AIFI as an assistant manager. The following 21 January, he moved to LALA under the same role.

In 2022, Aranda returned to Mineros as an under-18 manager, before becoming an assistant of the main squad in the following year. In May 2024, he joined Yaracuyanos also as an assistant and became an interim manager shortly after, after Gonzalo Martínez left.

Back to his assistant role in June 2024, Aranda was appointed manager of Yaracuyanos in July 2025, after Dayron Pérez left.
