= Jesús Chacón =

Venezuelan footballer (born 2001)

Personal information
- Full name: Jesús Daniel Chacón Martínez
- Date of birth: 8 June 2001 (age 25)
- Place of birth: Puerto Ordaz, Venezuela
- Height: 1.70 m (5 ft 7 in)
- Position: Midfielder

Team information
- Current team: Yaracuyanos
- Number: 8

Youth career
- Mineros de Guayana

Senior career*
Years	Team	Apps	(Gls)
2018	Mineros de Guayana	1	(0)
2019–2021	LALA	34	(0)
2022–2023	Mineros de Guayana	21	(0)
2024–	Yaracuyanos	50	(0)
- * Club domestic league appearances and goals as of 18:11, 3 January 2026 (UTC)

Jesús Daniel Chacón Martínez (born 8 June 2001) is a Venezuelan footballer who plays as a midfielder for Yaracuyanos.

== Career ==
=== Club career ===
Chacón is a product of Mineros de Guayana. In the summer 2017, he began training with Mineros' first team squad during the 2017 summer pre-season. He got his official debut for Mineros on 17 October 2018 in a game against Deportivo Lara in the Venezuelan Primera División.

In February 2019, Chacón joined fellow league club LALA FC.

In January 2024, Chacón moved to Yaracuyanos.
