= Marcelo Zuleta =

Argentine football manager

- Zuleta in 2020

Personal information
- Full name: Marcelo Javier Zuleta
- Date of birth: 25 January 1964 (age 62)
- Place of birth: Berisso, Argentina

Team information
- Current team: Anzoátegui (manager)

Managerial career
- Years: Team
- 1994–1995: Villa San Carlos
- 1997: Defensores
- 2002–2003: Roulado
- 2003: Alianza
- 2004: Isidro Metapán
- 2004: Luján de Cuyo
- 2005–2006: Nicaragua
- 2006–2007: Defensa y Justicia (assistant)
- 2008: Makedonikos
- 2008: Dinamo Tirana
- 2009: Najran SC
- 2009: Modriča Maxima
- 2010: Đồng Tâm Long An
- 2011: San José
- 2013: Đồng Tâm Long An
- 2018: Dominican Republic U17
- 2019: El Nacional
- 2020: LDU Portoviejo
- 2022–2023: Boxing Club
- 2024: El Nacional
- 2025: Monagas
- 2026: Juan Pablo II College
- 2026–: Anzoátegui

Marcelo Javier Zuleta (born 25 January 1964) is an Argentine football manager, currently in charge of Venezuelan club Anzoátegui.

== Managerial career ==
In 2018 and 2019, Zuleta was the manager of El Nacional in the Ecuadorian Serie A.
