= Jesús Ortiz (football manager) =

Venezuelan football manager (born 1987)

Personal information
- Full name: Jesús Alejandro Ortiz Parra
- Date of birth: 3 September 1987 (age 39)
- Place of birth: Rubio, Venezuela

Managerial career
- Years: Team
- 2014–2015: Deportivo Táchira (youth)
- 2015–2016: Salam Zgharta (assistant)
- 2016: Deportivo Táchira (youth)
- 2017–2018: Mineros (youth)
- 2019: Deportivo Táchira (assistant)
- 2020–2021: Deportivo Táchira (youth)
- 2022: Deportivo Lara (youth)
- 2022: Deportivo Lara (interim)
- 2022: Deportivo Lara
- 2023–2024: Portuguesa
- 2025: Mineros
- 2025: Estudiantes de Mérida
- 2026: Monagas

Jesús Alejandro Ortiz Parra (born 3 September 1987) is a Venezuelan football manager.

== Career ==
Born in Rubio, Táchira, Ortiz began his career with local schools before joining Deportivo Táchira's youth categories. In September 2015, he left the club to join a host of compatriots at Lebanese side Salam Zgharta FC.

Ortiz returned to his home country and Táchira in 2016, later working at Mineros de Guayana before returning to the club again in 2019. On 14 March 2022, he was named manager of Deportivo Lara's youth categories.

On 28 July 2022, Ortiz was named interim manager of Lara, after Eduardo Saragó resigned. On 9 August, he was permanently appointed manager.

On 1 March 2023, as Lara was denied a license to play in the 2022 top tier season, Ortiz replaced Martín Brignani at the helm of Portuguesa. He qualified the club to the 2024 Copa Libertadores, but left by mutual consent on 11 July 2024.

Ortiz took over Mineros on 9 March 2025, but resigned on 29 April. On 2 May, he was presented at Estudiantes de Mérida, but also resigned on 9 October.

On 13 June 2026, Ortiz took over Monagas also in the top tier. On 5 November, however, he was sacked.
