= José María Morr =

Venezuelan football manager (born 1981)

Personal information
- Full name: José María Morr Azuaje
- Date of birth: 12 April 1981 (age 45)
- Place of birth: Acarigua, Venezuela
- Height: 1.81 m (5 ft 11 in)
- Position: Forward

Team information
- Current team: Deportivo Lara (manager)

Senior career*
Years	Team	Apps	(Gls)
1997–2000	Portuguesa		
2001	Llaneros		
2002	Portuguesa		
2003	Unión Lara		
2004–2005	Estudiantes de Mérida		
2005	Unión Lara		
2006–2007	Guaros	?	(15)
2007	Minervén		
2007–2008	Policía de Lara		
2009	Guaros		
2009	Llaneros	14	(5)
2010	Deportivo Lara	3	(0)
2010	Portuguesa		

International career
2001	Venezuela U20		
2004	Venezuela U23		

Managerial career
- 2010–2015: Deportivo Lara (youth)
- 2015–2018: Venezuela U20 (assistant)
- 2016–2018: Venezuela (assistant)
- 2018: Estudiantes de Caracas
- 2019–2024: Metropolitanos
- 2025: Zamora
- 2026–: Deportivo Lara
- * Club domestic league appearances and goals

José María Morr Azuaje (born 12 April 1981) is a Venezuelan football manager and former player who played as a forward. He is the current manager of Deportivo Lara.

== Playing career ==
Born in Acarigua, Morr began his career with Portuguesa FC in 1997. He left the club in 2001 for Llaneros, but returned to his former side in 2002.

Morr subsequently resumed his career in the country's Primera División and Segunda División, representing Unión Lara (two stints), Estudiantes de Mérida, Guaros (two stints), Minervén, Policía de Lara, Llaneros, Deportivo Lara and Portuguesa. He retired with the latter in 2010, aged just 29.

== Managerial career ==
Shortly after retiring Morr took up coaching, being in charge of Deportivo Lara's youth sides. In August 2015, he was appointed Rafael Dudamel's assistant in the Venezuela under-20 team.

In April 2016, after Dudamel was appointed in charge of the full side, Morr was again named his assistant. He left the role on 30 August 2018, to take over first division side Estudiantes de Caracas.

Morr left Estudiantes on a mutual agreement on 28 November 2018, and was named in charge of Metropolitanos on 19 December. He led the side to their first-ever title in 2022, and resigned on 11 December 2024.

On 7 January 2025, Morr agreed to become the manager of Deportivo Lara in their return to professional football, but the move later collapsed as the club could not compete in the top tier, and he was announced at the helm of Zamora on 4 March. On 17 December, he left by mutual consent.

== Honours ==
=== Manager ===
Metropolitanos

- Venezuelan Primera División: 2022
