= Jhonny Ferreira =

Venezuelan footballer

Personal information
- Full name: Jhonny Ferreira Camacho
- Date of birth: 5 December 1977 (age 48)
- Place of birth: Caracas, Venezuela

Team information
- Current team: Venezuela U17 (manager)

Managerial career
- Years: Team
- San Agustín El Paraíso
- 2006–2008: Estrella Roja (assistant)
- 2008–2010: Venezuela U17 (assistant)
- 2010–2013: Caracas (assistant)
- 2013–2015: Carabobo
- 2016–2018: Monagas
- 2018–2019: Carabobo
- 2020–2023: Monagas
- 2025: Monagas
- 2025–: Venezuela U17

Jhonny Ferreira Camacho (born 5 December 1977) is a Venezuelan football manager, currently in charge of the Venezuela national under-17 team.

== Career ==
Born in Caracas, Ferreira began his career with C.S. Colegio San Agustín El Paraíso, and was later an assistant manager at Estrella Roja, Venezuela U17 and Caracas. On 31 May 2013, he was appointed manager of Primera División side Carabobo.

Ferreira resigned from Carabobo on 1 October 2015, and was named in charge of fellow league team Monagas on 24 May of the following year. On 10 July 2023, he became the latter's sporting director, with Tony Franco named manager.

On 16 January 2025, Ferreira returned to managerial duties at the same club. On 8 July, he left to take over the Venezuela national under-17 team.
