= Daniel Farías =

Venezuelan footballer (born 1981)

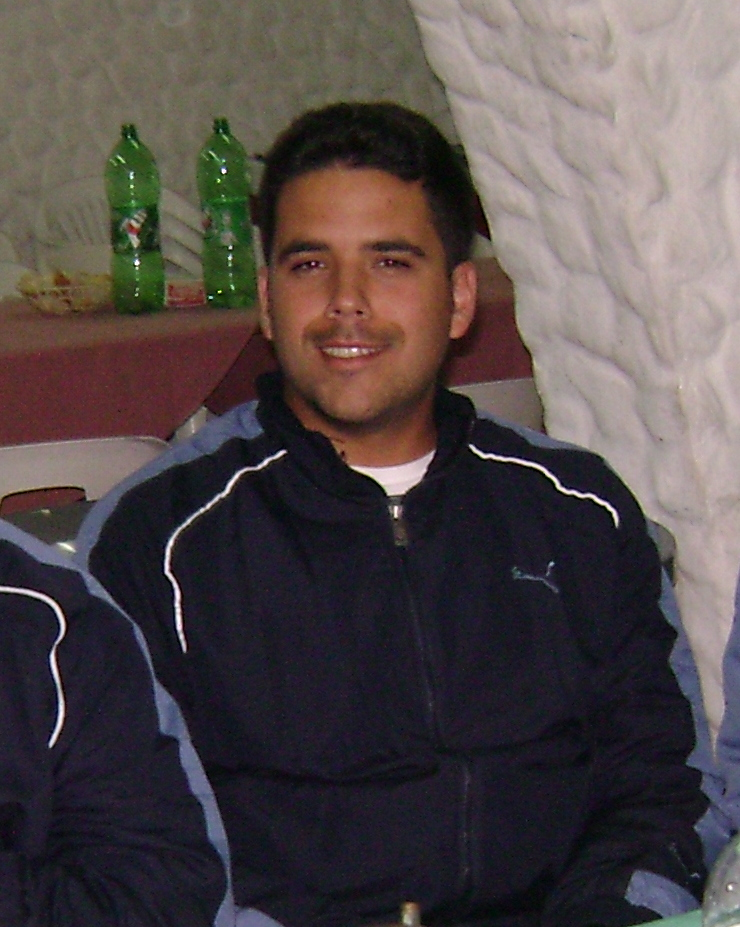
- Farías in 2007

Personal information
- Full name: Daniel Alejandro Farías Acosta
- Date of birth: 28 September 1981 (age 45)
- Place of birth: Cumaná, Venezuela
- Height: 1.93 m (6 ft 4 in)
- Position: Goalkeeper

Team information
- Current team: Carabobo (manager)

Senior career*
Years	Team	Apps	(Gls)
1997–1999	Nueva Cádiz		
1999–2001	Zulianos		

Managerial career
- 2007–2009: Deportivo Anzoátegui (assistant)
- 2009–2012: Deportivo Anzoátegui
- 2013–2015: Deportivo Táchira
- 2016: Cerro Porteño (assistant)
- 2016: The Strongest (assistant)
- 2017: Zulia
- 2017: The Strongest
- 2018–2022: Deportivo La Guaira
- 2018–2019: Bolivia (assistant)
- 2018: Bolivia (interim)
- 2023: Boston River
- 2023: Unión Comercio
- 2024–2025: Estudiantes de Mérida
- 2025–: Carabobo
- * Club domestic league appearances and goals

Daniel Alejandro Farías Acosta (born 28 September 1981) is a Venezuelan football manager and former player who played as a goalkeeper. He is the current manager of Carabobo.

== Career ==
Born in Cumaná, Farías represented hometown club Nueva Cádiz FC as a player, and remained with the club until 2001, when it moved to Maracaibo and changed name to Zulianos FC. He subsequently retired and started studying for a law degree.

After the arrival of his brother César as Deportivo Anzoátegui manager, Farías was named goalkeeping coach at the same club. After César's departure, he was named Marcos Mathías's assistant.

On 12 March 2009, Farías was appointed manager of Anzoátegui. He left the club on 12 December 2012, after winning that year's Copa Venezuela, and was named at the helm of Deportivo Táchira the following day.

After leaving the club in December 2015, Farías was an assistant of his brother César at Cerro Porteño and The Strongest before being appointed manager of Zulia FC on 12 January 2017. On 14 August, he took over The Strongest, but left on 19 December.

On 23 April 2018, Farías was named Deportivo La Guaira manager. On 5 June, after already being an assistant, he was invited by Bolivia to take charge of the team in friendlies against South Korea and Serbia, as his brother César was not available.

On 9 November 2022, Farías left La Guaira to take over Boston River of the Uruguayan Primera División. Sacked the following 3 April, he took over Peruvian club Unión Comercio on 27 May 2023, but resigned from the side on 22 July.

On 15 February 2024, Farías returned to his home country and took over Estudiantes de Mérida. He left by mutual consent on 15 April 2025, and took over Carabobo on 31 May.

== Honours ==
=== Player ===
Nueva Cádiz

- Venezuelan Segunda División: 1997–98

=== Manager ===
Deportivo Anzoátegui

- Copa de Venezuela: 2012

Deportivo Táchira

- Venezuelan Primera División: 2014–15
