= Francesco Stifano =

Venezuelan footballer and manager (born 1979)

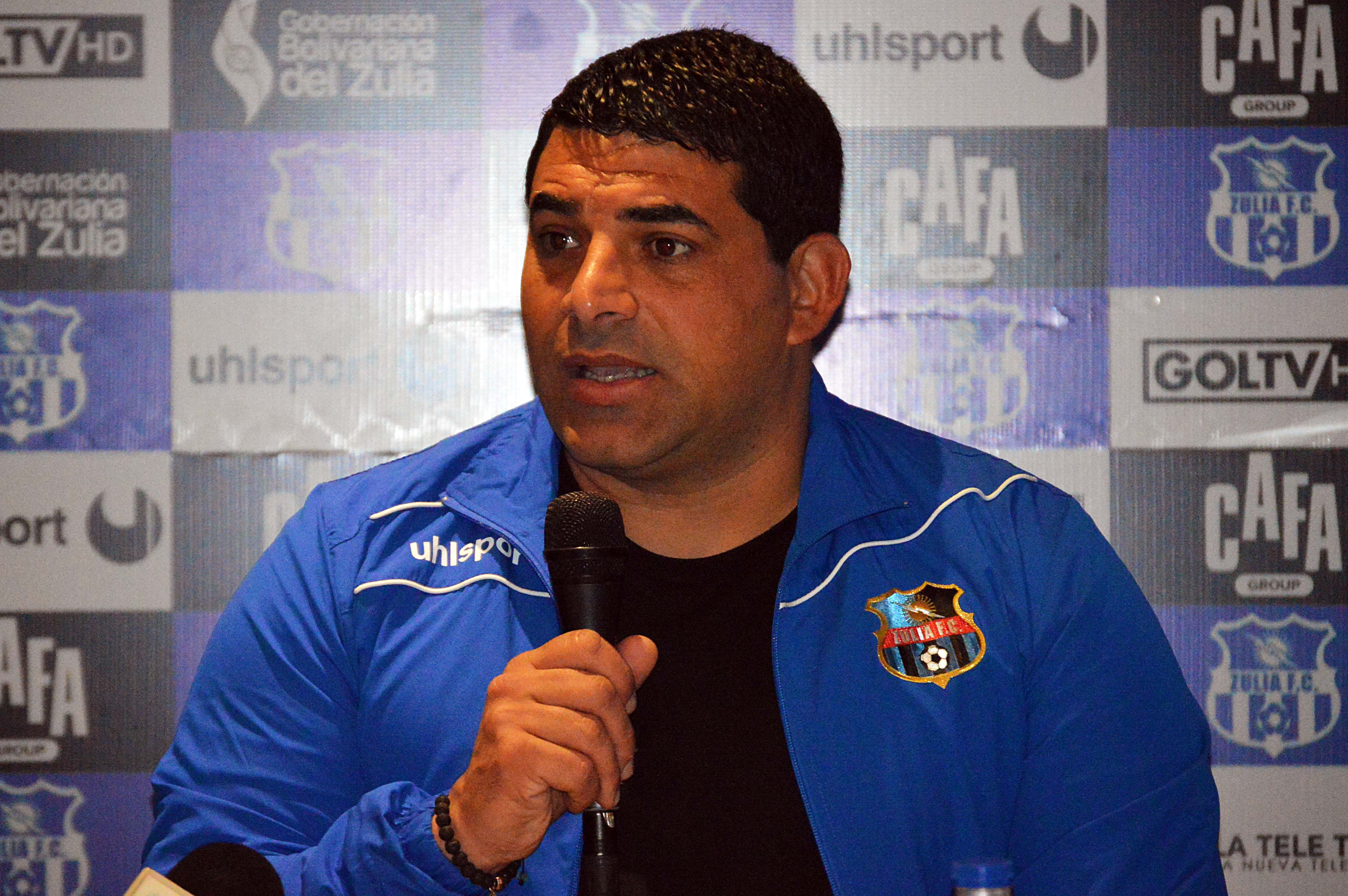
- Stifano in 2018

Personal information
- Full name: Francesco Stifano Garzone
- Date of birth: 19 July 1979 (age 47)
- Place of birth: Caracas, Venezuela

Team information
- Current team: Metropolitanos (manager)

Youth career
- Caracas

Senior career*
Years	Team	Apps	(Gls)
1998–2001	Caracas		
2002	Deportivo Italchacao		
2003	Marítimo de Margarita		

Managerial career
- 2003–2009: San Agustín El Paraíso
- 2009–2013: Real Esppor (youth)
- 2013: Deportivo La Guaira
- 2014: Portuguesa
- 2015: Tucanes de Amazonas
- 2015–2017: Zamora
- 2017–2018: Deportivo Táchira
- 2018–2019: Zulia
- 2020: Rionegro Águilas
- 2021: Águilas Doradas
- 2022: Caracas
- 2023: Zamora
- 2025–: Metropolitanos
- * Club domestic league appearances and goals

Francesco Stifano Garzone (born 19 July 1979) is a Venezuelan football manager and former player. He is the current manager of Metropolitanos.

== Career ==
Born in Caracas, Stifano made his senior debut with hometown side Caracas in 1998. In 2003, after playing for Deportivo Italchacao and Marítimo de Margarita, he retired.

Immediately after retiring Stifano took up coaching, being in charge of C.S. Colegio San Agustín El Paraíso's youth categories. In 2009 he moved to Real Esppor as their youth manager, and was named first team manager in June 2013. A few months later, the club changed their name to Deportivo La Guaira, and on 31 October, he was sacked.

In January 2014, Stifano was named manager of Portuguesa, and won the 2013–14 Segunda División with the club before being dismissed on 30 September. The following 3 March, he took over Tucanes de Amazonas.

Stifano was appointed at the helm of Zamora on 6 June 2015, and finished the campaign as champions. He opted to leave the club in June 2017, and was named in charge of Deportivo Táchira in October.

Stifano left Táchira on a mutual agreement on 22 May 2018, and took over Zulia on 17 June. He left the club on 15 September 2019, and moved abroad on 12 December after being appointed Rionegro Águilas manager.

Stifano left Águilas in December 2020 after his contract expired, but returned to the club the following 3 March after the resignation of Hubert Bodhert.

Stifano was sacked by Águilas on 16 November 2021, and returned to his home country on 27 December to take over Caracas. He was dismissed by the latter on 19 September 2022.

== Honours ==
Portuguesa

- Venezuelan Segunda División: 2013–14

Zamora

- Venezuelan Primera División: 2015
