= Bryan Castillo =

Venezuelan footballer (born 2001)

Personal information
- Full name: Bryan José Castillo Rosendo
- Date of birth: 14 May 2001 (age 25)
- Place of birth: Barquisimeto, Venezuela
- Height: 1.86 m (6 ft 1 in)
- Position: Forward

Team information
- Current team: Carabobo

Youth career
- Deportivo Lara

Senior career*
Years	Team	Apps	(Gls)
2018–2022	Deportivo Lara	69	(7)
2023–2025	Deportivo Táchira	58	(15)
2025–2026	Oleksandriya	25	(3)
2026–	Carabobo	5	(0)

International career^{‡}
2024	Venezuela U23	2	(0)
2026–	Venezuela	2	(0)
- * Club domestic league appearances and goals as of 19 September 2026 ‡ National team caps and goals as of 6 October 2026

Bryan José Castillo Rosendo (born 14 May 2001) is a Venezuelan footballer who plays as a forward for Carabobo and the Venezuela national team.

== Early life ==
Castillo was born on 24 May 2001. Born in Barquisimeto, Venezuela, he is a native of Lara, Venezuela.

== Club career ==
As a youth player, Castillo joined the youth academy of Venezuelan side Asociación Civil Deportivo Lara and was promoted to the club's senior team in 2018, where he made sixty-nine league appearances and scored seven goals.

Ahead of the 2023 season, he signed for Venezuelan side Deportivo Táchira FC, where he made fifty-eight league appearances and scored fifteen goals. Venezuelan news website wrote Balonazos in 2023 that he "became an important player for Táchira" while playing for the club. Following his stint there, he signed for Ukrainian side FC Oleksandriya in 2025.

== International career ==
Castillo is a Venezuela youth international. During January and February 2024, he played for the Venezuela national under-23 football team at the 2024 CONMEBOL Pre-Olympic Tournament.

== Style of play ==
Castillo plays as a forward. Venezuelan newspaper Diario Meridiano wrote in 2019 that he is "known as a classic number nine, with a powerful pivot to open up plays on the wings and a good shot from medium and long range. His aerial game is another of his strengths, along with his clinical finishing in one-on-one situations, where he is a true predator, giving him a knack for finding the back of the net".

== Career statistics ==
=== International ===
As of match played 6 October 2026

Appearances and goals by national team and year
National team	Year	Apps	Goals
Venezuela	2026	2	0
Total		2	0
