= Leonardo González (Venezuelan footballer) =

Venezuelan football manager (born 1972)

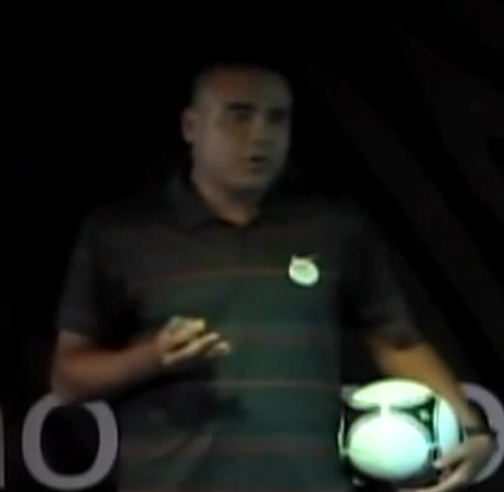
- González in 2012

Personal information
- Full name: Leonardo Alberto González Antequera
- Date of birth: 14 July 1972 (age 54)
- Place of birth: Valera, Venezuela
- Height: 1.85 m (6 ft 1 in)
- Position: Defender

Team information
- Current team: Portuguesa (manager)

Youth career
- Trujillanos

Senior career*
Years	Team	Apps	(Gls)
1992–1995	Trujillanos		
1996–2005	Caracas		
2005–2009	Trujillanos	79	(2)

International career
1993–2008	Venezuela	37	(0)

Managerial career
- 2011–2014: Trujillanos (assistant)
- 2014–2016: Deportivo La Guaira
- 2016–2020: Deportivo Lara
- 2021: Deportivo Lara
- 2021: Venezuela (interim)
- 2022: Estudiantes de Mérida
- 2023–2024: Caracas
- 2025: Anzoátegui
- 2026–: Portuguesa
- * Club domestic league appearances and goals

Leonardo Alberto González Antequera (born 14 July 1972) is a Venezuelan football manager and former player who played as a defender. He is the current manager of Portuguesa.

== Playing career ==
=== Club ===
Born in Valera, González made his senior debut with Trujillanos in 1992. In 1995 he moved to Caracas, and won four Primera División titles with the club beforer leaving in 2005.

After leaving Caracas, González returned to Trujillanos and was a regular starter until his retirement in 2009.

=== International ===
González made his international debut for the Venezuela national team on 23 January 1993, in a 0–0 draw against Peru. He represented the nation in three Copa América editions (1993, 1995 and 1997), and spent eleven years without playing for the side until his last cap in 2008.

== Managerial career ==
After retiring, González worked as an assistant at Trujillanos before being appointed manager of Deportivo La Guaira on 3 June 2014. On 31 July 2016, he was named in charge of Deportivo Lara.

González left Lara on 20 December 2020, after qualifying the club to the Copa Libertadores three times. The following 1 August, he returned to the club in the place of sacked Martín Brignani.

On 23 August 2021, González was named interim manager of the Venezuela national team, replacing José Peseiro. He resigned from Lara on 9 December, and took over Estudiantes de Mérida the following 21 March.

On 1 November 2022, González was named manager of Caracas for the upcoming season. On 31 March 2024, he left the club on a mutual agreement, after a poor start of the season.

On 26 December 2024, González took over top tier newcomers Anzoátegui for the upcoming season. He was sacked on 23 October 2025, and was named at the helm of Portuguesa on 21 November.

== Honours ==
=== Player ===
Caracas

- Venezuelan Primera División: 1996–97, 2000–01, 2002–03, 2003–04
