= Martín Brignani =

Argentine football manager

Personal information
- Full name: Martín Eugenio Brignani
- Date of birth: 10 May 1972 (age 54)
- Place of birth: Mar del Plata, Argentina
- Height: 1.65 m (5 ft 5 in)
- Position: Midfielder

Senior career*
Years	Team	Apps	(Gls)
1989–1996	San Lorenzo MdP		
1996–1997	Alvarado	0	(0)
1997–2000	Estudiantes de Mérida		
2000–2001	Caracas	21	(5)
2001–2002	Maracaibo	8	(1)
2002	Deportivo Pereira	0	(0)
2002	Estudiantes de Mérida		
2003–2005	San Martín SJ	40	(8)
2005–2006	Trujillanos	38	(11)
2007–2008	Talleres MdP		
2009–2010	General Urquiza		
2010–2011	San Isidro		
2011–2012	El Cañón		
2012–2013	San Isidro		

Managerial career
- 2014–2015: San Isidro
- 2016: San Lorenzo MdP
- 2018–2020: Estudiantes de Mérida
- 2021: Deportivo Lara
- 2022–2023: Portuguesa
- 2023: Real Tomayapo
- * Club domestic league appearances and goals

Martín Eugenio Brignani (born 10 May 1972) is an Argentine football manager and former player who played as a midfielder.

== Playing career ==
Born in Mar del Plata, Brignani played for Amateur local sides such as CA San Lorenzo Mar del Plata and Alvarado before moving to Venezuela in 1997, with Estudiantes de Mérida. In 2000, he joined Caracas, and played in the Copa Libertadores with the club.

Brignani subsequently represented Maracaibo and Deportivo Pereira before returning to Estudiantes de Mérida in 2002. He played for two seasons with San Martín SJ back in his home country before returning to Venezuela in 2005, with Trujillanos.

Back to his home country in 2007, Brignani played for lower league sides CA Talleres de Mar del Plata, CA General Urquiza, San Isidro (two stints) and CA El Cañón.

== Managerial career ==
In July 2014, Brignani was named manager of San Isidro. In 2016, he was in charge of another of his former teams, San Lorenzo de Mar del Plata. Subsequently, he worked at a Boca Juniors school in his hometown.

On 19 June 2018, Brignani was appointed at the helm of Estudiantes de Mérida. While at the club, he won the 2019 Apertura but lost the final to Caracas.

During the 2020 season, due to the COVID-19 pandemic, Brignani returned to his native Mar del Plata but could not return to Venezuela to manage the club in the 2020 Copa Libertadores due to the restrictions in Argentina. He managed the club through Zoom, while his assistant was on the field.

On 8 January 2021, Brignani resigned from Estudiantes, and was appointed at Deportivo Lara late in the month. He was sacked on 31 July, with the club outside the qualification zones.

On 10 August 2022, Brignani returned to Venezuela after being named manager of Portuguesa. He was sacked the following 1 March, after winning only one point out of nine into the new season.

On 12 October 2023, Brignani was named manager of Bolivian Primera División side Real Tomayapo.
