= Anzoátegui F.C. =

Venezuelan football club

Anzoátegui
- Full name: Anzoátegui Fútbol Club
- Founded: 18 December 2021; 4 years ago
- Ground: Estadio José Antonio Anzoátegui
- Capacity: 37,485
- Chairman: Fabián Eliantonio
- Manager: Vacant
- League: Liga FUTVE
- 2025: Liga FUTVE, 9th of 14
Home colours	Away colours

Anzoátegui Fútbol Club is a Venezuelan professional football club based in Puerto La Cruz, Anzoátegui. Founded in 2021, they play in the Venezuelan Primera División.

The club is not related to another club named Anzoátegui FC, founded in 1966 and dissolved in 1974.

== History ==
Founded on 18 December 2021 as Academia Anzoátegui Fútbol Club, the club was immediately included in the 2022 Segunda División.

Academia Anzoátegui finished second in its first season, losing the finals to Angostura. Ahead of the 2024 season, the club changed name to Anzoátegui Fútbol Club. They again finished second in that year, losing the finals to Yaracuyanos.

Following the end of the season, it was reported that Anzoátegui were negotiating a merger with Angostura, with which the club would take the latter's place in the top flight. On 14 January 2025, the Liga FUTVE confirmed that Anzoátegui would play the 2025 Primera División tournament, replacing Angostura in the tournament.

== Managers ==
- (Venezuela) Jesús Alonso Cabello (2022)
- (Venezuela) Álvaro Valencia (2022)
- (Venezuela) José Daniel González (2023)
- (Venezuela) Alexis Jordán (2023–24)
- (Venezuela) Juvencio Betancourt (2024)
- (Venezuela) Alexis Jordán (2024)
- (Venezuela) Leonardo González (2025–)
