= Kike García (Venezuelan footballer) =

Venezuelan football manager (born 1982)

Personal information
- Full name: Enrique García Feijoó
- Date of birth: 15 December 1982 (age 43)
- Place of birth: Caracas, Venezuela
- Position: Midfielder

Youth career
- 1986–2000: San Agustín El Paraíso
- 2001–2002: Caracas

Senior career*
Years	Team	Apps	(Gls)
2002–2003	Caracas		
2003–2004	Marítimo de Margarita		
2004	Aragua		
2005	Caracas		
2005–2008	Aragua		
2008	Estrella Roja		
2009	Mineros		
2010	Real Esppor		

Managerial career
- 2011–2013: San Agustín El Paraíso
- 2013–2015: Atlético Venezuela (assistant)
- 2014–2015: Atlético Venezuela (youth)
- 2016: Deportivo Petare
- 2016–2018: Nabi Chit
- 2018–2021: Aragua
- 2022: Carabobo
- 2023–2024: Deportivo La Guaira
- 2024: Inter de Barinas
- 2025: Tauro
- 2025: Monagas
- * Club domestic league appearances and goals

Enrique "Kike" García Feijoó (born 15 December 1982) is a Venezuelan football manager and former player who played as a midfielder.

== Playing career ==
Born in Caracas, García joined C.S. Colegio San Agustín El Paraíso in 1986 at the age of three. In 2001, aged 18, he signed for Caracas, and made his first team debut with the club in the following year.

In 2005, after a short periods at Marítimo de Margarita and Aragua, García returned to Caracas. He moved back to Aragua in the middle of 2005, establishing himself as a starter and winning the Copa Venezuela in 2008.

García signed for Estrella Roja for the 2008–09 season, but signed for Mineros de Guayana in January 2009. In 2010, he agreed to a deal with Real Esppor, and retired with the club in the end of the year, aged 28.

== Managerial career ==
Shortly after retiring, García took up coaching in his first team San Agustín. He subsequently moved to Atlético Venezuela, being an assistant manager of the main squad and manager of the under-20s.

On 29 November 2015, García was appointed manager of Deportivo Petare for the ensuing campaign. The following 23 May, he was named in charge of Lebanese club Al Nabi Chit SC.

García returned to his home country on 28 November 2018, after being appointed at the helm of former side Aragua. He resigned on 8 May 2021, after a poor start of the campaign.

García was named manager of Carabobo on 2 January 2022, but was sacked on 4 July. On 20 November, he was appointed in charge of Deportivo La Guaira for the 2023 season.

On 21 March 2024, García left La Guaira on a mutual agreement. On 3 September, he took over Inter de Barinas.
