= Estadio Misael Delgado =

Stadium in Valencia, Venezuela

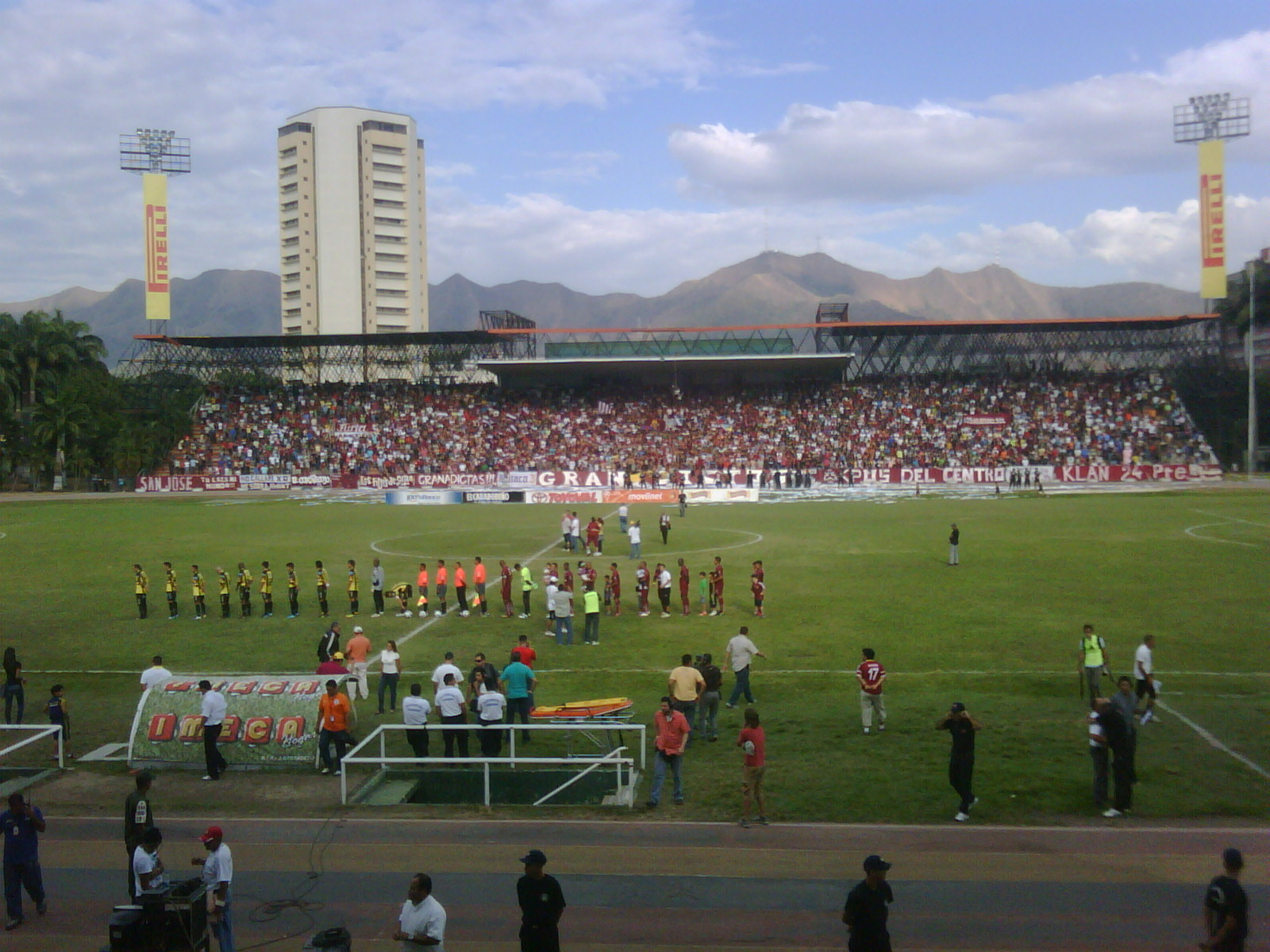
- Misael Delgado - Carabobo vs Deportivo Tachira 05-02-2011
- Interactive map of Estadio Misael Delgado
- Location: Valencia, Carabobo, Venezuela
- Coordinates: 10°13′24.25″N 68°0′41.4″W
- Owner: Fundadeporte
- Capacity: 10,400
- Surface: Artificial Grass

Construction
- Renovated: 2001

Tenants
- Carabobo FC; Gran Valencia FC

Estadio Misael Delgado is a multi-use stadium in Valencia, Venezuela. It is currently used mostly for football matches and is the home stadium of Carabobo FC and Gran Valencia FC. The stadium holds 10,400 people (all seaters) and was reopened in 2001 (last remodel). The stadium hosted the 1994 South American Games and the Campeonato Sudamericano Sub-20 de 1977 in which Diego Maradona participated.
