= Estadio General José Antonio Paez =

Venezuelan sports stadium

- Estadio José Antonio Páez
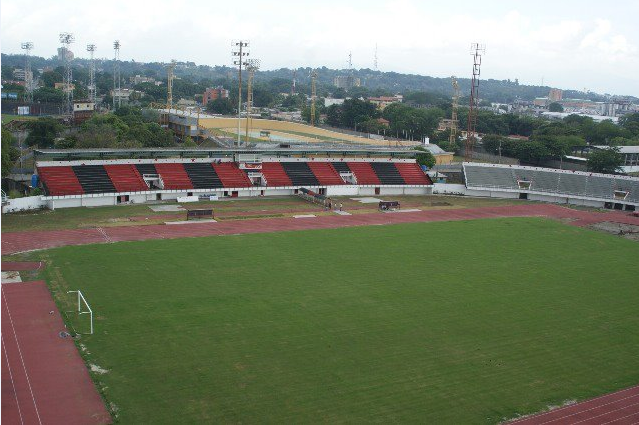
- Interactive map of Estadio General José Antonio Paez
- Location: Acarígua, Venezuela
- Coordinates: 9°34′15″N 69°12′37″W
- Owner: Instituto Nacional de Deportes
- Capacity: 18,000
- Surface: Natural Bermuda grass
- Field size: 105.4x65.5

Construction
- Opened: December 5, 1973 (52)
- Renovated: 2007 September 23, 2011 (14) First Stage
- Cost: 4,500,000,000.00 Bs. in the remodeling the (14)

Tenant
- Portuguesa Fútbol Club

The Estadio General José Antonio Páez is a sports infrastructure stadium in Acarígua, Venezuela. It is currently used mostly for football matches and is the home stadium of Portuguesa Fútbol Club the building was built in that place by the booming development of this locality llanera; owes its name to the recognized hero of Venezuelan independence and the first president of Venezuela, Jose Antonio Páez. It is the headquarters of the Portuguese Football Club, currently located in the First Division of Venezuela. Its facilities can hold approximately 18 thousand spectators; in 2007 underwent considerable improvements to be used in the National Plains Sports Games 2007 and was inaugurated in 1973.

The installation was submitted to a new stage of total recovery that consists of 3 stages: the first one was delivered on September 23, 2011, where the total recovery of the engraving, the baths of the popular tribunes were carried out, the construction of a gym for the players, bathrooms showers and dressing rooms for said gymnasium, construction of a transmission house, waterproofed and painted of all the tribunes.
