= Estadio Florentino Oropeza =

- Interactive map of Estadio Florentino Oropeza
- Full name: Estadio Olimpico Florentino Oropeza
- Location: San Felipe, Venezuela
- Coordinates: 10.333°N 68.756167°W
- Capacity: 10,000

Construction
- Opened: 1997

Tenant
- Yaracuyanos FC

Estadio Florentino Oropeza is a multi-use stadium in San Felipe, Venezuela. It is currently used mostly for football matches, on club level by Yaracuyanos FC of the Venezuelan Primera División. The stadium has a capacity of 10,000 spectators.
