= Liga FUTVE 3 =

Tercera División
- Founded: 2007
- Country: Venezuela
- Confederation: CONMEBOL
- Number of clubs: 41
- Level on pyramid: 3
- Promotion to: Segunda División
- Relegation to: Torneos Regionales
- Domestic cup: Copa Venezuela
- Website: FVF's website

Tercera División is the third tier of the Venezuelan football league system.

The Venezuelan second division was established in 2007.

== List of champions ==
Ed.	Season	Champion	Runner-up
1	2007–08	Fundación Cersarger	Guaros de Lara B
2	2008–09	Real Bolívar	La Victoria
3	2009–10	Aragua B	Deportivo Táchira B
4	2010–11	(no champion crowned) (Note: At the end of the season, the 6 best-placed teams of each group were directly promoted to Segunda División B.)	
5	2012	(no champion crowned)	
6	2012–13	(no champion crowned) (Note: At the end of the season, the 7 best-placed teams of each group were directly promoted to Segunda División B.)	
7	2013–14	(no champion crowned)	
8	2014–15	(no champion crowned) (Note: At the end of the season, the 5 best-placed teams of each group were directly promoted to Segunda División B.)	
9	2015	(no champion crowned)	
10	2016	Yaracuy	Ureña B
11	2017	Madeira Club Lara	Atlético Furrial
12	2018	Alianza Monay	Ciudad Vinotinto
13	2019	Fundación Lara	Minervén
–	2020	Canceled due to the COVID-19 pandemic	
–	2021	Canceled due to the COVID-19 pandemic	
–	2022	Canceled due to the COVID-19 pandemic	
14	2023	Minet FC	Catia FC
15	2024	Parcell FC	Guarico FC
16	2025	Parcell FC	Guarico FC

== Titles by Team ==
Club	Titles	Runners-up	Seasons won	Seasons runner-up
Alianza Monay	1	—	2018	—
Aragua B	1	—	2009–10	—
Fundación Cersarger	1	—	2007–08	—
Fundación Lara	1	—	2019	—
Madeira Club Lara	1	—	2017	—
Minet FC	1	—	2023	—
Parcell FC	1	—	2024	—
Real Bolívar	1	—	2008–09	—
Yaracuy	1	—	2016	—
Atlético Furrial	—	1	—	2017
Catia FC	—	1	—	2023
Ciudad Vinotinto	—	1	—	2018
Deportivo Táchira B	—	1	—	2009–10
Guarico FC	—	1	—	2024
Guaros de Lara B	—	1	—	2007–08
La Victoria	—	1	—	2008–09
Minervén	—	1	—	2019
Ureña B	—	1	—	2016
