= Gran Valencia F.C. =

Venezuelan football club

Gran Valencia
- Full name: Gran Valencia Fútbol Club
- Nickname(s): Blues (Azules)
- Founded: July 10, 2014; 11 years ago
- Dissolved: 2022
- Ground: Estadio Misael Delgado, Valencia, Carabobo
- Capacity: 10,400
- Manager: Bladimir Morales
- League: Primera División Venezolana
- 2021: 5th, Central Group

Gran Valencia Fútbol Club was a Venezuelan football club based in Valencia, Carabobo.
