= Portuguesa F.C. =

Venezuelan football club

Portuguesa
- Full name: Portuguesa Fútbol Club
- Nickname: Los Rojinegros (The Red-and-Black) "Los Lanceros" (The Lancers) "El Penta" (The Penta) "El grande del Llano" (The big of the Plains)
- Founded: 2 March 1972; 54 years ago
- Ground: Estadio General José Antonio Paez
- Capacity: 18,000
- Chairman: Vito Recchimurzo
- Manager: Leonardo González
- League: Liga FUTVE
- 2025: Liga FUTVE, 13th of 14
Home colours	Away colours	Third colours

Portuguesa Fútbol Club, usually known simply as Portuguesa, is a Venezuelan professional football club based in Acarigua. It currently competes in the Primera División.

== History ==
The club was founded on 10 April 1972, in Acarigua in the northern part of the state of Portuguesa. In 1973 the club won the Primera División for the first time and four more titles followed until 1978.The club has played a total 9 times in the Copa Libertadores.

== Rivalries ==
=== The Vintage Clásico ===
The encounter between Portuguesa and Estudiantes de Mérida is one of the most classic and oldest of Venezuelan football, they are two of the most traditional clubs in the country. The first match played between both teams was on 28 May 1972, in the Copa Venezuela. The match ended with a 1–1 draw, with goals from Chiazzaro at the 73rd minute and Cholo Mendoza at the 79th minute, and so beginning the oldest ongoing classic in the country.

The Red and Black Clásico

The encounter between Portuguesa and Deportivo Lara, due to both teams sharing the same colors (red and black), the proximity between the cities where the teams are based (Acarigua and Barquisimeto), and due to the frequent and violent confrontations that have occurred between the fans of both teams (Lanceros Rojinegros of Portuguesa and Huracán Rojinegro of Lara)

=== Portuguesa Clásico ===
Portuguesa played the so-called Clásico portugueseño against Llaneros de Guanare, these are the two most important clubs in the state of Portuguesa, both having a good number of fans. The first meeting between the two took place on September 28, 1986 (with a scoreless draw) and continued, for now, until 2022 when Llaneros was dissolved.

Club	Victories	Draws
Portuguesa	15	7
Llaneros FC	12	7

== Honours ==
=== National ===
- Primera División
  - Winners (5): 1973, 1975, 1976, 1977, 1978
- Copa de Venezuela
  - Winners (3): 1973, 1976, 1977
  - Runners-up (1): 1990
- Segunda División Venezolana
  - Winners (2): 2005–06, 2013–14
- Double
  - Winners (3): 1973, 1976, 1977

== Performance in CONMEBOL competitions ==
- Copa Libertadores: 9 appearances

1974: Group Stage
1975: Group Stage
1976: Group Stage
1977: Semi-finals
1978: Group Stage
1979: Group Stage
1981: Group Stage
1984: Group Stage
2024: Second stage

- Copa CONMEBOL: 1 appearance

1997: First round

== Manufacturers and sponsors ==
Suppliers

Period	Provider
1972–2007	(Venezuela) No brand
2008–2010	(China) Runic
2010–2011	(Venezuela) No brand
2011–2012	(Venezuela) Winlife Sport Wear
2012–2013	(Venezuela) No brand
2013–2014	(Germany) Uhlsport
2014–2015	(Venezuela) No brand
2015–2016	(Germany) Uhlsport
2017–2021	(Venezuela) Mundo Creativo
2022–2023	(Venezuela) RS
2024–	(Venezuela) Attle

Sponsors

Period	Sponsor
1972–2008	Without sponsor
2008–2009	(Venezuela) Garzón Hipermercado; Expresos Los Llanos
2010–2012	Without sponsor
2012–2013	(Venezuela) Movilnet; Minci; Oleica (Aceite Portumesa), Gobernación de Portuguesa, Yess Sport
2013–2014	(Germany) Uhlsport (Venezuela) T&C Sports Management; Oleica (Aceite Portumesa); Alimentos Mary; JHS AVES; Portuguesa Socialista; Caposa; Tuampolla.com; Agrícola A y B Movilnet
2015–2016	(Germany) Uhlsport (Venezuela) Alimentos Mary; Gobernación de Portuguesa; ANCA; Aceite Portuguesa; FarmaSanRoque; ALIVENSA; Arroz Santoni
2017–Present	(Venezuela) Mundo Creativo; ALIVENSA; Alimentos Mary; FarmaSanRoque; Arroz Santoni; AsoPortuguesa; Doña Emilia

== Stadium ==
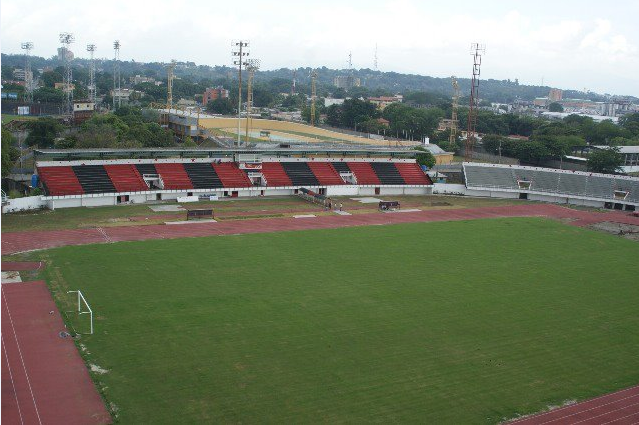
Estadio José Antonio Páez

The José Antonio Páez Stadium is a sports infrastructure built for the practice of football, located in the city of Acarigua in the state of Portuguesa of the western plains of Venezuela. Despite not being the capital of the region, the building was built in that place by the booming development of the place; owes its name to the recognized hero of Venezuelan independence and the first president of Venezuela, José Antonio Páez.

It is the headquarters of Portuguesa Fútbol Club, currently playing in the First Division of Venezuela. Its facilities have the capacity to hold approximately 14,000 spectators; in 2007 it underwent considerable improvements to be used in the National Sports Games of 2007.

== Supporters ==
It has a good fan base, having been a successful club in the past in Venezuelan football, with organised groups such as the Lanceros Rojinegros who are usually located in the south stand of the stadium.

== Current squad ==
Note: Flags indicate national team as defined under FIFA eligibility rules; some limited exceptions apply. Players may hold more than one non-FIFA nationality.

No.	Pos.	Nation	Player
1	GK	VEN	Beycker Velásquez
4	DF	ARG	Ezequiel Gnemmi
5	MF	VEN	José Soto
6	DF	VEN	Anthony Trujillo
7	FW	VEN	Rubén Rojas
8	MF	ARG	Gonzalo Salega
9	FW	ARG	Jonathan Cañete
11	MF	VEN	Johan Moreno
13	DF	VEN	Edwin Peraza
14	DF	VEN	Óscar González
16	MF	VEN	Heber García
17	DF	VEN	Keiver Zúñiga
18	MF	VEN	Christopher Montaña
19	FW	VEN	Marco Bustillo

No.	Pos.	Nation	Player
20	FW	VEN	José Pérez
21	MF	COL	Carlos Suárez
22	GK	VEN	Juan Reyes
23	FW	VEN	David Linarez
24	MF	ARG	Lautaro Lovazzano
25	MF	VEN	Yonniel Bullones
26	MF	VEN	Alejandro Yepez
27	DF	VEN	Luis Quero
29	FW	VEN	Wilfredo Peña
30	FW	VEN	Robert Mendoza
31	FW	VEN	Marlon Rivero
33	DF	VEN	Moisés Acuña
66	DF	VEN	César Urpín

== Managerial history ==
- (Venezuela) Isidoro 'Pescaito' Rodríguez 1972
- (Uruguay) Walter Roque 1973 -1974
- (Socialist Federal Republic of Yugoslavia) Vladica Popović 1974 – 1975
- (Paraguay) Benjamín Fernández 1975 – 1976
- (Paraguay) Celino Mora 1977 – 1979
- (Peru) Carlos Felipe Núñez 2003 – 2004
- (Venezuela) Liberio Mora 2006 – 2007
- (Paraguay) Celino Mora 2007 – 2008
- (Venezuela) William Pacheco 2008
- (Venezuela) Eduardo Contreras 2008 – 2009
- (Venezuela) José Luis Jiménez 2009
- (Venezuela) Gustavo Valencia 2010
- (Venezuela) Johnny Lucena 2010 – 2012
- (Peru) Carlos Felipe Núñez 2012
- (Venezuela) José Luis Dolgetta 2013
- (Venezuela) Francesco Stifano 2013 – 2014
- (Venezuela) Lenin Bastidas 2014 – 2015
- (Uruguay) (Venezuela) Renato Renauro 2016
- (Argentina) Horacio Matuszyczk 2016 – 2017
- (Argentina) (Venezuela) Carlos Horacio Moreno 2017 – 2018
- (Venezuela) Yobanny Rivero 2019 – 2020
- (Colombia) (Venezuela) José Parada 2019 – 2020
- (Venezuela) Alí Cañas 2020 – 2022
- (Argentina) Martín Brignani 2022 – 2023
- (Venezuela) Jesús Ortíz 2023 –

== Club board and organization chart ==
=== Organizational shart ===
President  VEN Vito Recchimurzo Díaz 
Vice President  VEN Maiker Frías
Members  VEN Orlando Cárdenas
Members  VEN Luis Fernández
Members  VEN Olympia Labrador
Adviser  VEN Gianni Mazzocca
General Manager  VEN Eduardo Herrera
Sports Manager  VEN Gerzon Chacón
Manager of Operations  VEN Rafael Guaricuco

Media and Press || VEN Patricia Almao – Media Director Francisco Miliani – Media Assistant María Gabriela Almao – Social Networks Juan Sánchez – Photographer Raiber Jiménez – Graphic Designer

=== Previous presidents ===
- (Italy) Don Gaetano Costa (1972 – 1978)
- (Venezuela) Juan Rondon (2008 – 2010)
- (Venezuela) Nelson Escobar (2010 – 2014)
- (Venezuela) Generozo Mazzoca (2014 – 2019)
- (Venezuela) Maiker Frías (2019 – 2024)
- (Venezuela) Vito Recchimurzo (2024 – )

== Means of communication ==
=== Media coverage ===
==== Fanática 99.5fm ====
The radio station that broadcasts the games of the five-time Venezuelan champions.
