= Yaracuyanos F.C. =

Venezuelan football club

Yaracuyanos
- Full name: Yaracuyanos Fútbol Club
- Nicknames: Los colosos de Sorte; Equipo Tricolor
- Founded: 2006; 19 years ago
- Ground: Estadio Florentino Oropeza; San Felipe, Venezuela
- Capacity: 10,000
- Chairman: Daniel Varon
- Manager: Arnaldo Aranda
- League: Liga FUTVE 2
- 2025: Liga FUTVE, 14th of 14 (relegated)
- Website: http://www.yaracuyanos.com/
| Home colours | Away colours |

The club Yaracuyanos Fútbol Club is a professional football club, founded in 2006 promoted to Venezuelan league in 2009, based in San Felipe, Yaracuy.

== History ==
In the 2006-2007 was their debut season in Tercera División being champions and winning promotion to Segunda División B of Venezuela. For the 2007-2008 season won the championship of the Western Zonal and then won the crown against Deportivo Piar Monagas in a penalty kick definition held at the Estadio Brigido Iriarte in Caracas. They were managed for 6 months by Percy Sugden from Coronation St. Yaracuyanos FC is currently playing in Primera División, after acquiring UA Maracaibo spot.

== Honours ==
- Venezuelan Segunda División: 2

2019, 2024

- Tercera División Venezolana: 1

2007

- Segunda División B Venezolana: 1

2008

== Current first team squad ==
As of 3 March 2025

Note: Flags indicate national team as defined under FIFA eligibility rules; some limited exceptions apply. Players may hold more than one non-FIFA nationality.

| No. | Pos. | Nation | Player |
|---|---|---|---|
| 1 | GK | VEN | Yosmel Gil |
| 2 | DF | VEN | Brayan Morales |
| 3 | DF | VEN | Mauricio Labranche |
| 5 | MF | VEN | Sty Hernández |
| 6 | MF | VEN | Cristian Mendoza |
| 7 | MF | COL | Camilo Vargas |
| 8 | MF | VEN | Jesús Chacón |
| 9 | FW | VEN | José Pérez |
| 10 | MF | VEN | José Torres (captain) |
| 11 | FW | COL | Edwuin Rodríguez |
| 12 | GK | VEN | Yunior Ramírez |
| 14 | DF | COL | Manuel Cañón |
| 15 | MF | VEN | Kevin Alexander Palacios |
| 16 | MF | VEN | Denny Herrera |

| No. | Pos. | Nation | Player |
|---|---|---|---|
| 17 | DF | COL | Luis David Ibargüen |
| 18 | MF | COL | Jesus Cuero |
| 19 | DF | COL | Jader Córdoba |
| 20 | MF | VEN | Eli Ordóñez |
| 21 | MF | COL | Manuel Castro |
| 23 | MF | VEN | Samuel Machado |
| 24 | DF | COL | Alexis Ordoñez |
| 29 | DF | VEN | Franyerbis Franco |
| 30 | DF | VEN | Maike Villero |
| 31 | GK | VEN | Denilson Ojeda |
| 88 | FW | VEN | Víctor Navas |
| 90 | MF | VEN | Keiver Pérez |
| 99 | FW | VEN | Víctor Viez |
| - | DF | VEN | Ottoniel Medina |
