= Carabobo F.C. =

Venezuelan football club

Carabobo
- Full name: Carabobo Fútbol Club
- Nicknames: El Granate; El Vinotinto Regional
- Founded: February 26, 1997; 29 years ago
- Ground: Estadio Misael Delgado; Valencia, Venezuela
- Capacity: 10,400
- Chairman: Giuseppe Palmisano
- Manager: Daniel Farías
- League: Liga FUTVE
- 2025: Liga FUTVE, 2nd of 14 (season runners-up)
- Website: https://carabobofc.org/
Home colours	Away colours

Carabobo FC is a Venezuelan professional football club playing at the top level, the Venezuelan Primera División. It is based in Valencia.

== Stadium ==
Their home stadium is Estadio Misael Delgado.

== Titles ==
- Primera División Venezolana
  - Professional Era (1): 1971 (as Valencia FC)
- Segunda División Venezolana:
  - 1990 (as Valencia FC)
- Copa de Venezuela:
  - 1965, 1978 (both as Valencia FC)
- Copa de Campeones:
  - 1965

== Performance in CONMEBOL competitions ==
- Copa Libertadores: 4 appearances

1970: First Round
1972: First Round
1974: First Round
2017: Second Stage

- Copa Sudamericana: 3 appearances

2004: Second Preliminary Round
2006: Preliminary Round
2007: Preliminary Round

== Current squad ==
=== First team squad ===
As of 19 November, 2026

Note: Flags indicate national team as defined under FIFA eligibility rules; some limited exceptions apply. Players may hold more than one non-FIFA nationality.

No.	Pos.	Nation	Player
1	GK	VEN	Miguel Silva
2	DF	VEN	Marcel Guaramato
3	DF	VEN	Jean Fuentes
4	DF	VEN	Leonardo Aponte
5	MF	VEN	Edson Castillo
6	DF	VEN	Abraham Bahachille
8	DF	VEN	Juan Camilo Pérez
9	FW	VEN	Bryan Castillo (on loan from Oleksandriya)
10	MF	VEN	Yohandry Orozco
11	FW	VEN	Darwin Machís (on loan from América de Cali)
12	GK	VEN	Keiber Roa
13	DF	VEN	José Durán
14	FW	COL	Joshuan Berríos
15	MF	VEN	Maurice Cova
16	MF	VEN	Franner López

No.	Pos.	Nation	Player
17	DF	VEN	Franyer Oliveros
19	FW	VEN	Loureins Martínez
20	FW	HON	Exon Arzú
21	DF	VEN	Alexander González (captain)
22	GK	VEN	Diego Gil
23	MF	VEN	Dimas Meza
24	FW	VEN	Eric Ramírez
26	MF	ARG	Matías Núñez
28	DF	PER	Jonathan Bilbao
29	FW	VEN	Sebastián Calabrese
30	MF	VEN	Sebastián Mendoza
32	DF	ARG	Ezequiel Neira
33	MF	VEN	Ángelo Lucena
37	FW	VEN	Félix Diaz
38	MF	VEN	Ezequiel Crespo
