= Liga FUTVE 2 =

- Founded: 1979
- Country: Venezuela
- Confederation: CONMEBOL
- Number of clubs: 16
- Level on pyramid: 2
- Promotion to: Primera División
- Relegation to: Tercera División
- Domestic cup: Copa Venezuela
- Current champions: Trujillanos (2nd title) (2025)
- Most championships: Llaneros de Guanare (4)
- Broadcaster(s): Terrestrial: TVes; Pay TV: GOL TV; Streaming: FIFA+
- Website: FVF's website

Segunda División, officially known as Liga FUTVE 2, is the men's second professional football division of the Venezuelan football league system.

The Venezuelan second division was established in 1979.

== List of champions ==
Ed.	Season	Champion	Runner-up
1	1979	Falcón	Atlético Portuguesa
2	1980	Falcón	Unión Deportiva Lara
3	1981	San Cristóbal	Petroleros de Zulia
4	1982	Mineros de Guayana	Atlético Portuguesa
–	1983	No Tournament	
5	1984	Caracas	Atlético Anzoátegui
6	1985	Marítimo	Atlético Portuguesa
7	1986	Universidad de Los Andes	Deportivo Galicia
8	1986–87	Pepeganga Margarita	Peninsulares
9	1987–88	Deportivo Galicia	Minervén
10	1988–89	Trujillanos	Maracaibo FC
11	1989–90	Valencia	Monagas
12	1990–91	Salineros	Industriales del Caroní
13	1991–92	Deportivo Galicia	Llaneros
14	1992–93	Atlético El Vigía	Maracaibo FC
15	1993–94	Deportivo Lara	Marinos
16	1994–95	Universidad de Los Andes	Atlético Zamora
17	1995–96	Llaneros	Unión Deportiva Lara
18	1996–97	Nacional Táchira	Valencia
19	1997–98	Nueva Cádiz	Atlético Zamora
20	1998–99	Llaneros	Trujillanos
–	1999–00	No Tournament	
21	2000–01	Deportivo Galicia	Portuguesa
22	2001–02	Zulianos	Carabobo
23	2002–03	Atlético El Vigía	Unión Lara
24	2003–04	Unión Deportivo Marítimo	Deportivo Anzoátegui
25	2004–05	Aragua	Deportivo Maracaibo
26	2005–06	Portuguesa	Zamora
27	2006–07	Atlético El Vigía	Guaros
28	2007–08	Zulia	Minervén
29	2008–09	Atlético Trujillo	Centro Ítalo
30	2009–10	Atlético Venezuela	Caracas B
31	2010–11	Llaneros	Tucanes
32	2011–12	Atlético Venezuela	Portuguesa
33	2012–13	Tucanes	Carabobo
34	2013–14	Portuguesa	Metropolitanos
35	2014–15	Ureña	Estudiantes de Caracas
36	2015	Monagas	Deportivo JBL
37	2016	Metropolitanos	Atlético Socopó
38	2017	Estudiantes de Caracas	Gran Valencia
39	2018	Llaneros	LALA
40	2019	Yaracuyanos	GV Maracay
41	2020	Hermanos Colmenarez	Universidad Central
42	2021	Titanes	Atlético La Cruz
43	2022	Angostura	Academia Anzoátegui
44	2023	Ureña	Bolívar
45	2024	Yaracuyanos	Anzoátegui
46	2025	Trujillanos	Titanes

== Titles by team ==
Club	Titles	Runners-up	Seasons won	Seasons runner-up
Llaneros	4	1	1995–96, 1998–99, 2010–11, 2018	1991-92
Deportivo Galicia	3	1	1987–88, 1991–92, 2000–01	1986
Atlético El Vigía	3	—	1992–93, 2002–03, 2006–07	—
Portuguesa	2	2	2005–06, 2013–14	2000–01, 2011–12
Trujillanos	2	1	1988–89, 2025	1998–99
Atlético Venezuela	2	—	2009–10, 2011–12	—
Universidad de Los Andes	2	—	1986, 1994–95	—
Falcón	2	—	1979, 1980	—
Ureña	2	—	2014–15, 2023	—
Yaracuyanos	2	—	2019, 2024	—
Deportivo Lara	1	2	1993–94	1980, 1995–96
Estudiantes de Caracas	1	1	2017	2014–15
Metropolitanos	1	1	2016	2013–14
Monagas	1	1	2015	1989–90
Tucanes	1	1	2012–13	2010–11
Valencia	1	1	1989–90	1996–97
Peninsulares	1	1	1990–91	1986–87
Titanes	1	1	2021	2025
Angostura	1	—	2022	—
Aragua	1	—	2004–05	—
Atlético Trujillo	1	—	2008–09	—
San Cristóbal	1	—	1981	—
Caracas	1	—	1984	—
Hermanos Colmenarez	1	—	2020	—
Marítimo	1	—	2003–04	—
Mineros de Guayana	1	—	1982	—
Nacional Táchira	1	—	1996–97	—
Pepeganga Margarita	1	—	1986–87	—
Zulia	1	—	2007–08	—
Nueva Cádiz	1	—	1997–98	—
Unión Deportivo Marítimo	1	—	2003–04	—
Zulianos	1	—	2000–01	—
