= Barinas =

Barinas may refer to:

== Places ==
Spain

- Barinas (Spain)

Venezuela

- Barinas (state), one of the 23 states which make up the country
- Barinas, Barinas, a city in the state of Barinas
  - Roman Catholic Diocese of Barinas
- Barinas Municipality, a municipio in the state of Barinas
- Barinas Province, a former province, in existence from 1786 to 1864

== Other uses ==
- Barinas (harvestman), a genus of the Agoristenidae family of harvestmen

== See also ==
- Holden Barina, an automobile
