= Sosa Municipality =

Sosa Municipality Municipio Sosa
- Municipality
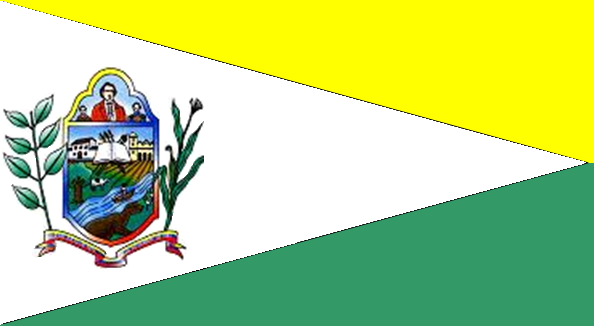
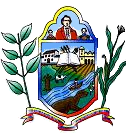
- Flag Coat of arms

- Location in Barinas

- Location in Venezuela
- Coordinates: 8°09′26″N 69°05′45″W
- Country: Venezuela
- State: Barinas

Government
  - Mayor: Frank Contreras Mideros (PSUV)

Area
  - Total: 2,922.8 km^{2} (1,128.5 sq mi)

Population (2011)
  - Total: 24,142
  - Density: 8.2599/km^{2} (21.393/sq mi)
- Time zone: UTC−4 (VET)
- Area code(s): 0273

The Sosa Municipality is one of the 12 municipalities (municipios) that makes up the Venezuelan state of Barinas and, according to the 2011 census by the National Institute of Statistics of Venezuela, the municipality has a population of 24,142. The town of Ciudad de Nutrias is the municipal seat of the Sosa Municipality.

== Demographics ==
The Sosa Municipality, according to a 2007 population estimate by the National Institute of Statistics of Venezuela, has a population of 27,445 (up from 21,960 in 2000). This amounts to 3.6% of the state's population. The municipality's population density is 7.7 inhabitants per square kilometre (20/sq mi).

== Government ==
The mayor of the Sosa Municipality is Francisco Ramon Ramírez, re-elected on October 31, 2004, with 41% of the vote. The municipality is divided into four parishes; Ciudad de Nutrias, El Regalo, Puerto de Nutrias, and Santa Catalina.
