= Ezequiel Zamora Municipality, Barinas =

Ezequiel Zamora Municipality Municipio Ezequiel Zamora
- Municipality
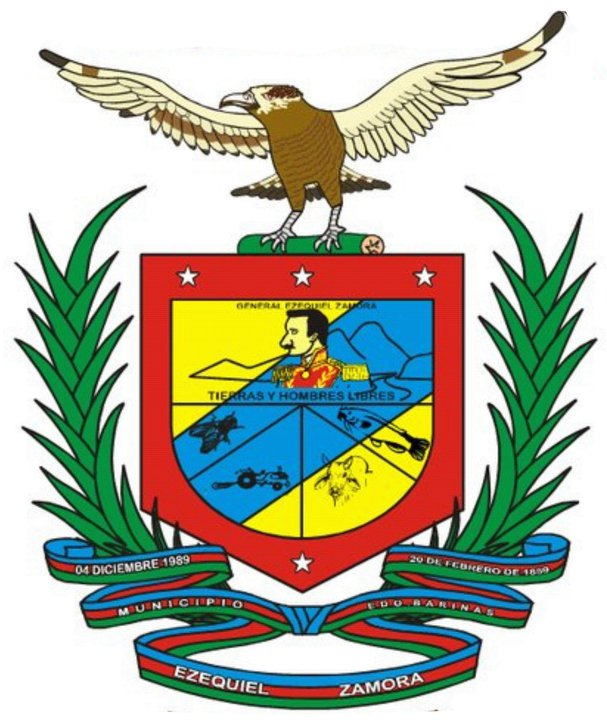
- Flag Coat of arms

- Location in Barinas

- Location in Venezuela
- Coordinates: 7°45′31″N 71°03′54″W
- Country: Venezuela
- State: Barinas
- Municipal seat: Santa Bárbara[*]

Government
  - Mayor: Derwin Sandoval Díaz PSUV

Area
  - Total: 3,994.0 km^{2} (1,542.1 sq mi)

Population (2011)
  - Total: 53,580
  - Density: 13.42/km^{2} (34.75/sq mi)
- Time zone: UTC−4 (VET)
- Area code(s): 0278
- Website: Official website

The Ezequiel Zamora Municipality is one of the 12 municipalities (municipios) that makes up the Venezuelan state of Barinas and, according to the 2011 census by the National Institute of Statistics of Venezuela, the municipality has a population of 53,580. The town of Santa Bárbara is the shire town of the Ezequiel Zamora Municipality. The municipality is named for the 19th century Venezuelan soldier Ezequiel Zamora.

== Demographics ==
The Ezequiel Zamora Municipality, according to a 2007 population estimate by the National Institute of Statistics of Venezuela, has a population of 51,436 (up from 43,367 in 2000). This amounts to 6.8% of the state's population. The municipality's population density is 12.7 inhabitants per square kilometre (33/sq mi).

== Government ==
The mayor of the Ezequiel Zamora Municipality is Levid Emilio Méndez, re-elected on October 31, 2004, with 38% of the vote. The municipality is divided into four parishes; Santa Bárbara, José Ignacio del Pumar, Pedro Briceño Méndez, and Ramón Ignacio Méndez.
