= Rojas Municipality =

Rojas Municipality Municipio Rojas
- Municipality
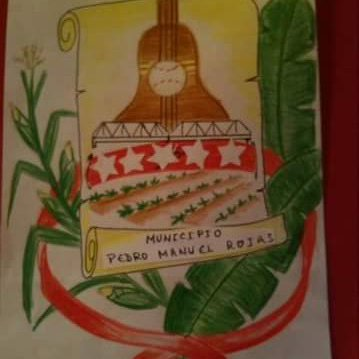
- Flag Coat of arms

- Location in Barinas

- Location in Venezuela
- Coordinates: 8°28′57″N 69°33′16″W
- Country: Venezuela
- State: Barinas

Government
  - Mayor: Tito Mejías González (PSUV)

Area
  - Total: 2,494.4 km^{2} (963.1 sq mi)

Population (2011)
  - Total: 40,126
  - Density: 16.086/km^{2} (41.664/sq mi)
- Time zone: UTC−4 (VET)
- Area code(s): 0273
- Website: Official website

The Rojas Municipality is one of the 12 municipalities (municipios) that makes up the Venezuelan state of Barinas and, according to the 2011 census by the National Institute of Statistics of Venezuela, the municipality has a population of 40,126. The town of Libertad is the shire town of the Rojas Municipality.

== Demographics ==
The Rojas Municipality, according to a 2007 population estimate by the National Institute of Statistics of Venezuela, has a population of 40,264 (up from 34,132 in 2000). This amounts to 5.3% of the state's population. The municipality's population density is 25.3 inhabitants per square kilometre (66/sq mi).

== Government ==
The mayor of the Rojas Municipality is Orlando Leonel Gómez Mendoza, re-elected on October 31, 2004, with 48% of the vote. The municipality is divided into four parishes; Libertad, Dolores, Palacios Fajardo, and Santa Rosa.

== See also ==
- Libertad
- Barinas
- Municipalities of Venezuela
