= Pedraza Municipality =

Pedraza Municipality Municipio Pedraza
- Municipality
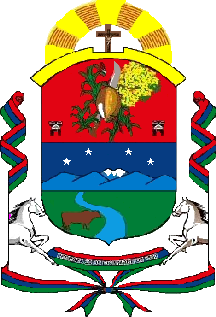
- Flag Coat of arms

- Location in Barinas

- Location in Venezuela
- Coordinates: 8°03′28″N 70°19′20″W
- Country: Venezuela
- State: Barinas
- Municipal seat: Ciudad Bolivia[*]

Government
  - Mayor: Jéssica Lalama Milan (PSUV)

Area
  - Total: 5,925.6 km^{2} (2,287.9 sq mi)

Population (2011)
  - Total: 65,390
  - Density: 11.04/km^{2} (28.58/sq mi)
- Time zone: UTC−4 (VET)
- Area code(s): 0273

The Pedraza Municipality is one of the 12 municipalities (municipios) that makes up the Venezuelan state of Barinas and, according to the 2011 census by the National Institute of Statistics of Venezuela, the municipality has a population of 65,390. The town of Ciudad Bolivia is the shire town of the Pedraza Municipality.

== Demographics ==
The Pedraza Municipality, according to a 2007 population estimate by the National Institute of Statistics of Venezuela, has a population of 62,847 (up from 52,411 in 2000). This amounts to 8.3% of the state's population. The municipality's population density is 9.4 inhabitants per square kilometre (24/sq mi).

== Government ==
The mayor of the Pedraza Municipality is Frenchy Tomas Díaz Rodríguez, re-elected on October 31, 2004, with 69% of the vote. The municipality is divided into four parishes; Ciudad Bolivia, Ignacio Briceño, José Félix Ribas, Páez.

== See also ==
- Barinas
- Municipalities of Venezuela
