= Arismendi Municipality, Barinas =

Arismendi Municipality Municipio Arismendi
- Municipality
- Flag

- Location in Barinas

- Location in Venezuela
- Coordinates: 8°14′19″N 68°15′49″W
- Country: Venezuela
- State: Barinas
- Municipal seat: Arismendi[*]

Government
  - Mayor: Pedro Moreno Linares (PSUV)

Area
  - Total: 7,425.8 km^{2} (2,867.1 sq mi)

Population (2011)
  - Total: 23,727
  - Density: 3.1952/km^{2} (8.2756/sq mi)
- Time zone: UTC−4 (VET)
- Area code(s): 0273
- Website: Official website

The Arismendi Municipality is one of the 12 municipalities (municipios) that makes up the Venezuelan state of Barinas and, according to the 2011 census by the National Institute of Statistics of Venezuela, the municipality has a population of 23,727. The town of Arismendi is the municipal seat of the Arismendi Municipality.

== Demographics ==
The Arismendi Municipality, according to a 2007 population estimate by the National Institute of Statistics of Venezuela, has a population of 20,305 (up from 18,941 in 2000). This amounts to 2.7% of the state's population. The municipality's population density is 2.8 inhabitants per square kilometre (7.3/sq mi).

== Government ==
The mayor of the Arismendi Municipality is Ramón Frías, elected on October 31, 2004, with 61% of the vote. He replaced Noheli Abreu shortly after the elections. The municipality is divided into four parishes; Arismendi, Guadarrama, La Unión, and San Antonio.
