= Obispos Municipality =

Obispos Municipality Municipio Obispos
- Municipality
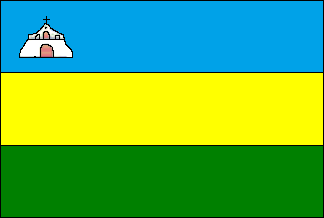
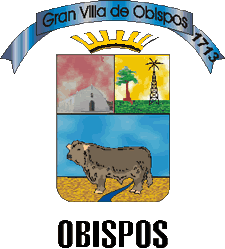
- Flag Coat of arms

- Location in Barinas

- Location in Venezuela
- Coordinates: 8°22′58″N 69°52′13″W
- Country: Venezuela
- State: Barinas

Government
  - Mayor: Luis Henríquez Escobar (PSUV)

Area
  - Total: 1,820.7 km^{2} (703.0 sq mi)

Population (2011)
  - Total: 37,493
  - Density: 20.593/km^{2} (53.335/sq mi)
- Time zone: UTC−4 (VET)
- Area code(s): 0273
- Website: Official website

The Obispos Municipality is one of the 12 municipalities (municipios) that makes up the Venezuelan state of Barinas and, according to the 2011 census by the National Institute of Statistics of Venezuela, the municipality has a population of 37,493. The town of Obispos is the municipal seat of the Obispos Municipality.

== Demographics ==
The Obispos Municipality, according to a 2007 population estimate by the National Institute of Statistics of Venezuela, has a population of 31,694 (up from 26,595 in 2000). This amounts to 4.2% of the state's population. The municipality's population density is 18.1 inhabitants per square kilometre (47/sq mi).

== Government ==
The mayor of the Obispos Municipality is Luis Manuel Zambrano Volcan, re-elected on October 31, 2004, with 54% of the vote. The municipality is divided into four parishes; Obispos, El Real, La Luz, and Los Guasimitos.
