= Cruz Paredes Municipality =

Cruz Paredes Municipality Municipio Cruz Paredes
- Municipality
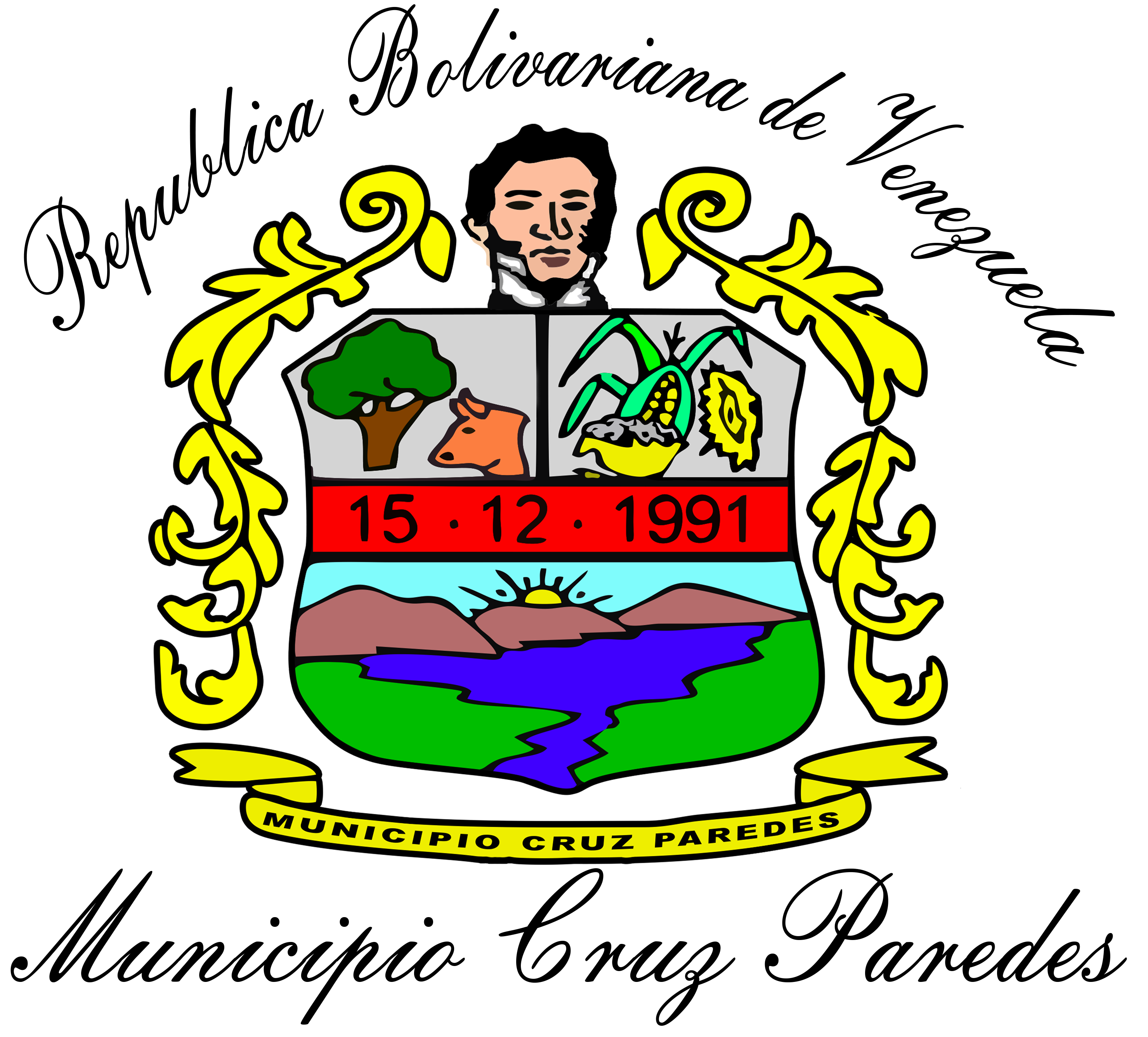
- Flag Coat of arms

- Location in Barinas

- Location in Venezuela
- Coordinates: 8°51′02″N 70°15′32″W
- Country: Venezuela
- State: Barinas
- Municipal seat: Barrancas[*]

Government
  - Mayor: Henry Maldonado Paredes (MUD)

Area
  - Total: 762.6 km^{2} (294.4 sq mi)

Population (2011)
  - Total: 26,042
  - Density: 34.15/km^{2} (88.45/sq mi)
- Time zone: UTC−4 (VET)
- Area code(s): 0273
- Website: Official website

The Cruz Paredes Municipality is one of the 12 municipalities (municipios) that makes up the Venezuelan state of Barinas and, according to the 2011 census by the National Institute of Statistics of Venezuela, the municipality has a population of 26,042. The town of Barrancas is the municipal seat of the Cruz Paredes Municipality.

== Demographics ==
The Cruz Paredes Municipality, according to a 2007 population estimate by the National Institute of Statistics of Venezuela, has a population of 25,178 (up from 21,197 in 2000). This amounts to 3.3% of the state's population. The municipality's population density is 32.4 inhabitants per square kilometre (84/sq mi).

== Government ==
The mayor of the Cruz Paredes Municipality is María Guadalupe Fernández Acuña, elected on October 31, 2004, with 42% of the vote. She replaced Carlos Ramirez shortly after the elections. The municipality is divided into three parishes; Barrancas, El Socorro, and Masparrito.
