= Barinas Municipality =

Barinas Municipality Municipio Barinas
- Municipality
- Flag Coat of arms

- Location in Barinas

- Location in Venezuela
- Coordinates: 8°15′57″N 70°02′31″W
- Country: Venezuela
- State: Barinas
- Municipal seat: Barinas

Area
  - Total: 3,304 km^{2} (1,276 sq mi)

Population (2011)
  - Total: 361,678
  - Density: 109.5/km^{2} (283.5/sq mi)
- Time zone: UTC−4 (VET)
- Area code(s): 0273
- Website: Official website

Barinas Municipality is a municipality in the Venezuelan state of Barinas. The town of Barinas serves as the seat of the state. It is spread over an area of 3,304 km^{2} (1,276 sq mi), and lies on the banks of the Santo Domingo River in the foothills of the Cordillera mountains in northwestern Venezuela. As per the 2011 census, the municipality has a population of 361,678 inhabitants.

== Geography ==
Barinas is one of the 12 municipalities in the Venezuelan state of Barinas. It is spread over an area of 3,304 km^{2} (1,276 sq mi). It lies on the banks of the Santo Domingo River in the foothills of the Cordillera mountains in northwestern Venezuela, and marks the start of the Venezuelan plains down from the Andes.

== Administration ==
The town of Barinas, Barinas is the seat of the state of Barinas, and is the largest urban center in the Venezuelan plains. Also known as Ciudad Marquesa, it was officially established in 1758, from a city originally founded by Spanish captain Juan Andrés Varela as Altamira de Cáceres. The local administration is headed by a mayor. The municipality is divided into seven localities– Barinas, El Corozo, La Caramuca, La Mula, Quebrada Seca, San Silvestre, and Torunos.

== Demographics and economy ==
As per the 2011 census by the National Institute of Statistics of Venezuela, the municipality has a population of 361,678 inhabitants. The population consisted of 174,859 males and 178,992 females. About 99,899 inhabitants (28.2%) were below the age of fourteen. Majority (92.7%) of the population was classified as urban, and the rest (7.3%) as rural. The municipality had a literacy rate of 95.9%. Mestizos (53%) formed the major ethnic group, followed by Whites (47%).

Agriculture and livestock rearing are major contributors to the economy. Tobacco and cocoa was extensively cultivated earlier, while the major food crops include rice, coffee, bananas, and millets.
