= Barinas (state) =

Venezuelan state

Coordinates: 8°38′N 70°12′W

- State of Venezuela
- Flag Coat of arms
- Motto: Dios y Federación (English: God and Federation)
- Anthem: Himno del Estado Barinas
- Location within Venezuela
- Country: Venezuela
- Created: 1937
- Capital: Barinas

Government
  - Body: Legislative Council
  - Governor: Adán Chávez

Area
  - Total: 35,200 km^{2} (13,600 sq mi)
  - Rank: 8th
- 3.84% of Venezuela

Population (2011)
  - Total: 816,264
  - Rank: 15th
- 2.87% of Venezuela
- Time zone: UTC−4 (VET)
- ISO 3166 code: VE-E
- Emblematic tree: Cedro (Cedrela odorata)
- HDI (2019): 0.657 medium · 23rd of 24
- Website: www.barinas.net.ve

Barinas State (Spanish: Estado Barinas, IPA: [esˈtaðo βaˈɾinas]) is one of the 23 states of Venezuela. The state capital is Barinas.

Barinas State covers a total surface area of 35,200 km^{2} (13,600 sq mi) and had an estimated population of 970,689 in 2015.

== Toponymy ==
The toponym "Barinas" is a variant of "varinas" (the name of an indigenous ethnic group that inhabited the Piedemonte before the arrival of the Spaniards); this may have a relationship with the name "Barima", given by the tunebos to the Santo Domingo river in the Aya myth. The meaning is unknown, but according to popular belief, it means a 'strong wind that comes from the valleys of the Santo Domingo river', referring to the Barinese wind, which blows in the Llanos Altos.

According to Virgilio Tosta, the place name was first used before 1628 as an alternative name for Altamira; in contrast, according to Betancourt Martínez, it was in the foundations of Barinitas such as Nueva Trujillo de Barinas (1628) and Barinas (1759). It expanded with the creation of the Province of Barinas in 1786 and was reduced to the present region in 1859.

Because of this toponym, Senna aculeata – a low, thorny and yellow-flowered shrub in the state – is sometimes called the barinas flower, which is why it is the state flower.

== History ==
=== Pre-Columbian era ===
Extent of the Orinoco culture from 1000 BC to 1550 AD. In 500, the Orinoco people built the first mounds and causeways of Llanos

The first known inhabitants of Barinas were the peoples of the Osoid culture. The Osoid people inhabited the middle elevations of the Llanos and were fishermen, hunters, and maize farmers. Their first archaeological evidence is from the Caño del Oso phase of 1000 BC, probably originating from a trade network linked to the Arawaks on the Negro, Orinoco, and Apure rivers. Between 180 BC and 550 AD, the Osoid people expanded north and interacted with the Tocuyanoid people of Lara. In 500 AD, interaction with groups from the Orinoco gave rise to the La Betania phase, during which agricultural production accelerated with the introduction of cassava and pollock corn. During this time, the Osoid people built the first mounds and causeways in the Llanos. By 600 AD, chiefdom societies were probably formed in towns such as Gaván. Between 1200 and 1550, the Ossoids expanded throughout Portuguesa as ethnic diversity in the region increased, with the arrival of tierroid peoples from Lara, dabajuroids from Falcón, and arauquinoids from Apure.

In prehistory, the western foothills were a trading area between the peoples of the Llanos and the Andes. There are several petroglyphs in the region made by Arawaks, Tunebos of Colombia or peoples of Mérida. Georg von Speyer and Nikolaus Federmann explored the region in 1534 on their way to the Andes. In 1542, Philipp von Hutten traveled from Coro over this area en route towards Colombia. In 1547, Alonso Pérez de Tolosa, who came from El Tocuyo, also crossed the territory.

=== Colonial era ===
King Charles III elevated the jurisdiction of Barinas to a province in 1786, separating it from Maracaibo. In 1787, Barinas had 40,991 inhabitants: 34% black, 33% white, 26% indigenous, and 5% slaves. 75% of the indigenous people lived in religious reductions, which were Capuchin, Dominican and of the church itself. Governor Fernando Miyares diversified agriculture apart from tobacco, and founded the first prison, the first hospital, and the city of San Fernando de Apure. The export of livestock and agricultural products was consolidated, which were destined for Europe through the Apure, Orinoco and other rivers.

In 1535, Europeans started to explore the region, this time on behalf of the Welsares, when the then governor, Jorge de Espira, crossed Barinas along with his group during his expedition in search for El Dorado del Meta and faced jirajaras along the way. Nicolás Federmán passed by the present Arismendi the same year. Philip of Utre, who had accompanied Espira, repeated his expedition in 1541. Alonso Pérez de Tolosa also crossed Barinas in 1549, heading for El Tocuyo, after he failed in a conquest entrusted to him by the then governor Juan Pérez de Tolosa.

==== Altamira de Cáceres ====
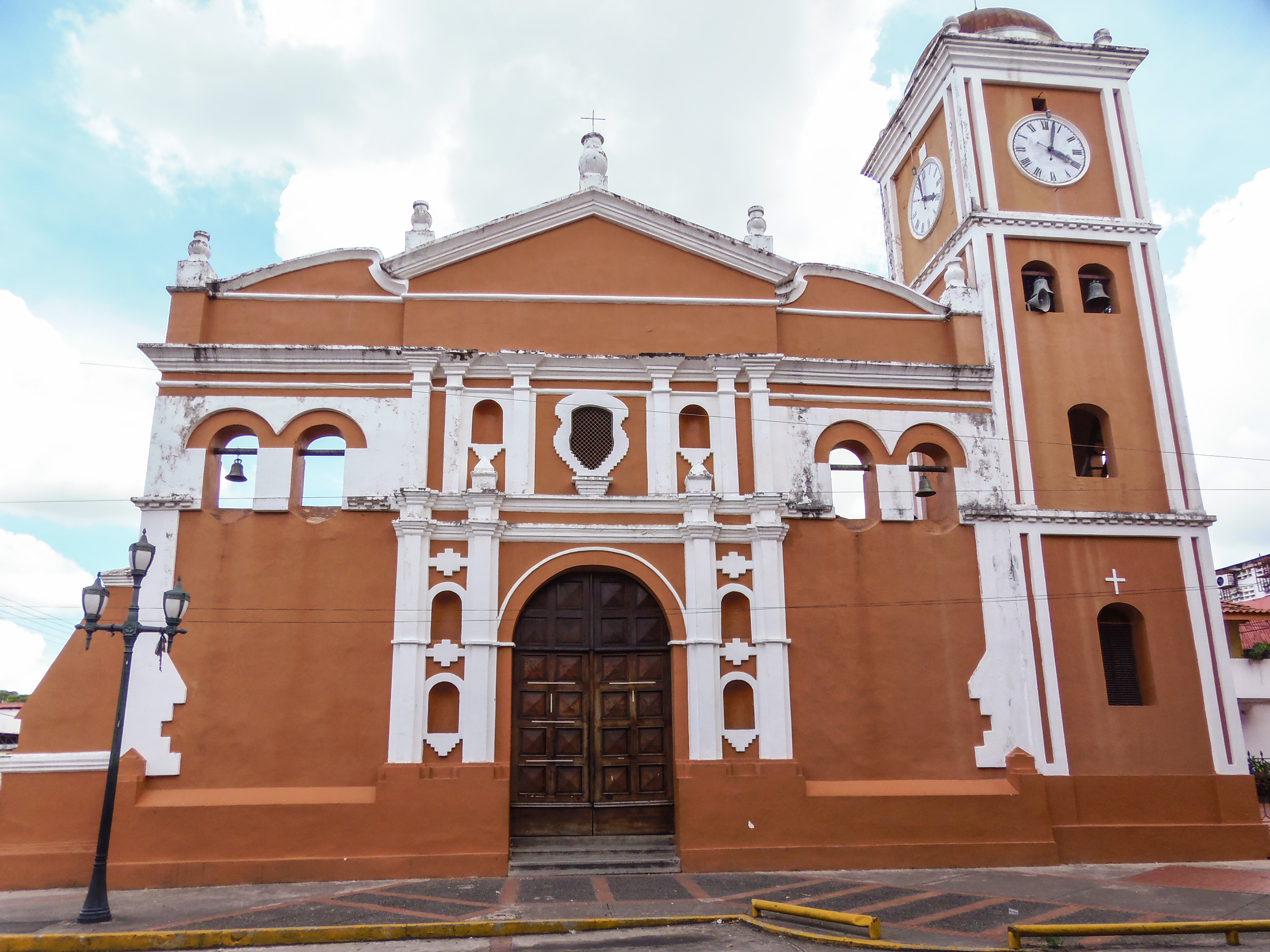
Nuestra Señora del Pilar Cathedral in the city of Barinas, built by the Spanish between 1770 and 1780

The colonization of Barinas began on 30 June 1577, when Captain Juan Andrés Varela, commissioned by the governor of La Grita Province, Francisco de Cáceres, founded the city of Altamira de Cáceres while choosing a mountainous place.

Altamira was a small city. Its inhabitants led a dangerous life being close to the jirajaras and had limited space. Due to the city's precarious conditions, Varela resigned his post as mayor a few months after founding it, and, a decade later, its inhabitants desired to move.

In spite of the inconveniences, Altamira was populated for four decades thanks to cattle raising and tobacco cultivation, and was able to compete with Cuba in the beginning. The population of the city did not prosper as expected, reaching only sixteen Creoles and 250 Indians, in spite of the fact that, according to Virgilio Tosta, "tobacco turned the primitive Barinas into a globally famous name".

==== New Trujillo of Barinas ====
The citizens of Altamira gradually moved towards El Llano, until in 1628, by order of the governor of the Province of Mérida and La Grita, Juan Pacheco Maldonado, the city was refounded as "Nueva Trujillo de Barinas" – today Barinitas. This was because the plateau was closer to the Llanos, which they wanted to conquer, while having better land for livestock and tobacco cultivation (which had become intensive due to the high demand and had generated a great deal of smuggling led by the Dutch).

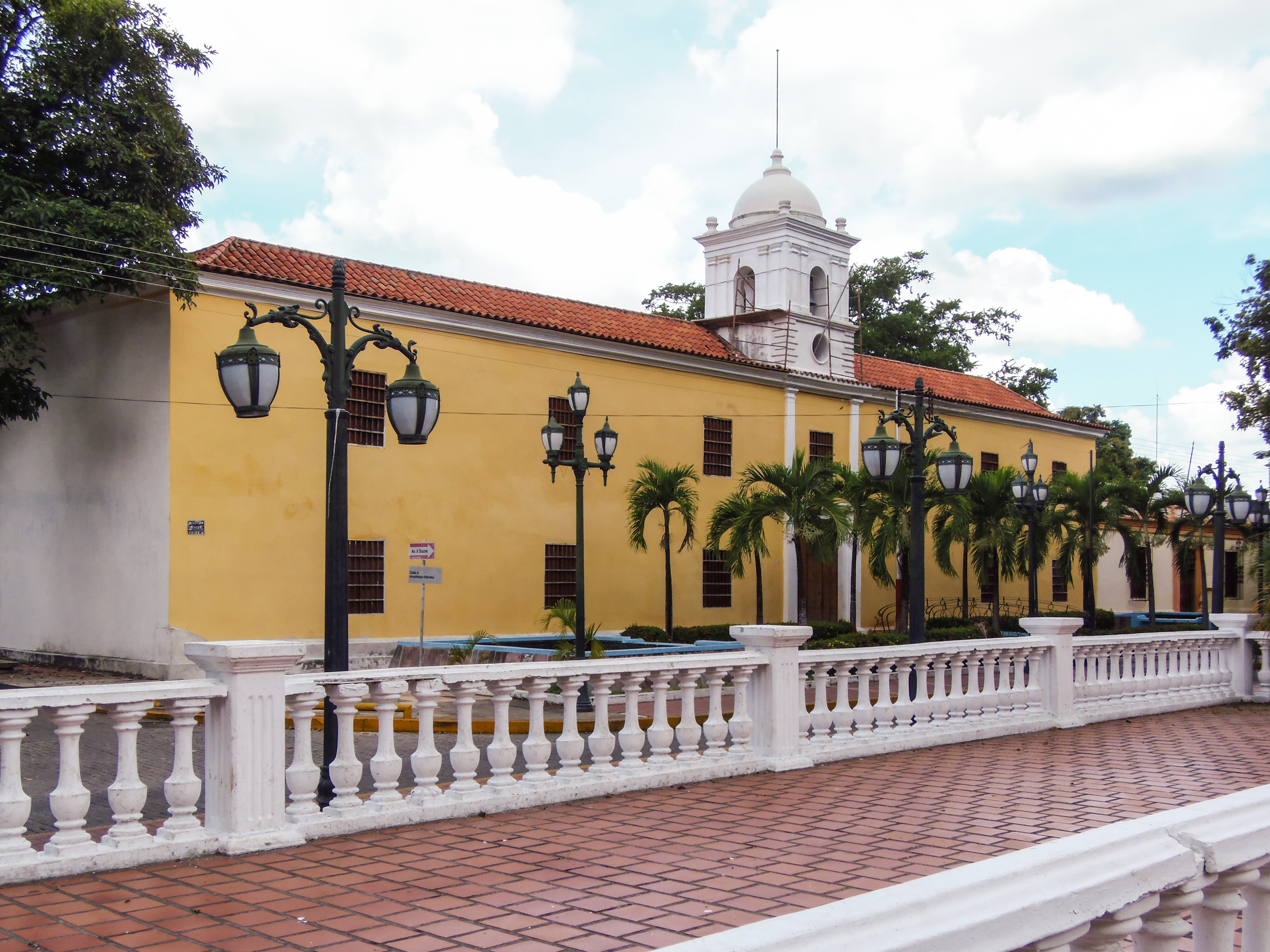
Casa de la cultura Napoleón Sebastián Arteaga which functioned as a royal Spanish prison, José Antonio Páez was imprisoned there in 1813

Nueva Trujillo is considered the "gateway to the conquest of the Llanos", because from here, important settlements were founded in view of the Llanos: the town of doctrine of Nuestra Señora de la Concepción del Curay (1619, which is La Barinesa today), the city of Nuestra Señora de Pedraza (1951, which is Ciudad Bolivia today) and the Indian towns of Santa Bárbara and Curbatí.

After the sacking of Maracaibo and the burning of Gibraltar by the Dutch (1641), the Barinese thought of alternate trade routes; thus, in 1647, Miguel de Ochogavia undertook the successful expedition to discover the Santo Domingo-Apure-Orinoco connection, through which the subsequent conquest of Apure was carried out. This discovery led to the subsequent emergence of the ports of Torunos and Nutrias.

==== Spanish province of Barinas ====
The progressive pacification of the Indians, the development of extensive cattle raising, the general interest in evading the taxes of the Crown and the fall in demand for tobacco by the end of the 17th century caused the Barinese to abandon the table of Moromoy in order to populate the savannas around the rivers Santo Domingo, Masparro and Boconó. The Barinese established their herds there and formed important towns, such as Sabaneta, Barrancas and Obispos. For this reason, on 11 July 1759, the Viceroy of the New Granada, Jose Solis, decreed the definitive foundation of Barinas, with the name and on the current place – where the town of San Antonio de los Cerritos was by then, in order to establish a center of power closer to the new towns.

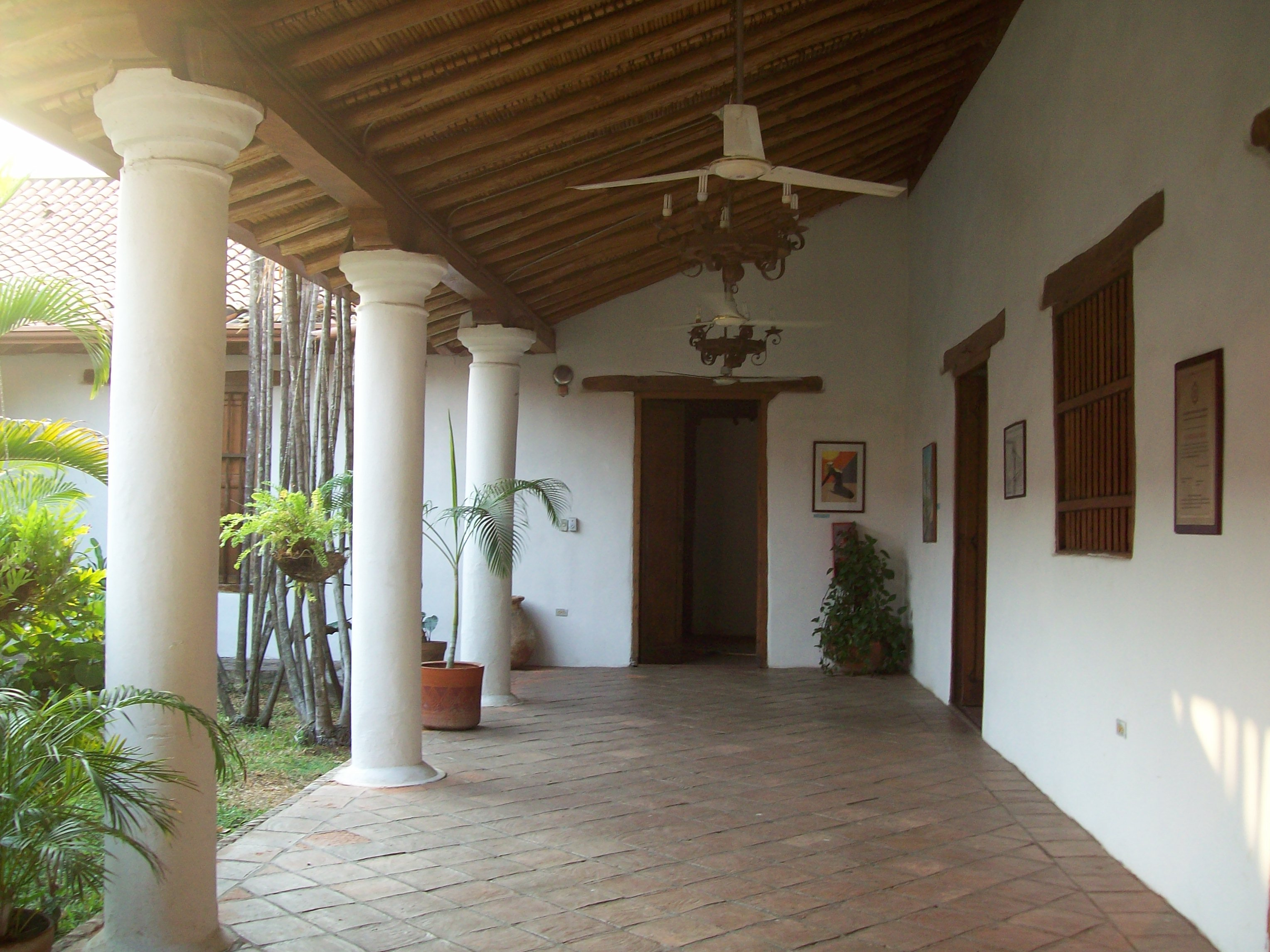
Alberto Arvelo Torrealba Museum, a building from the Spanish colonial period, believed to have been visited by the Libertador Simón Bolívar in 1813

Barinas was part of the Captaincy General of Venezuela since its creation. On 15 February 1786, King Carlos III decreed, over a territory that extended to cover the current states of Apure and Portuguesa, the creation of the Province of Barinas, separating it from Maracaibo. During this period, there was a remarkable diversification and economic growth, stimulated by the trade and cultivation of tobacco, sugar, indigo, cocoa, cotton, onoto and coffee. The Spaniards also built the first prison and hospital. There was a great population growth, as census records show.

Barinas defeated the Comuneros of the Andes (1781), a fact that led to King Carlos IV granting it, in 1790, the coat of arms that today retains the state capital, along with the motto "very noble and very loyal".

=== Independence process ===
Barinas joined the process of the Supreme Board of Caracas on 5 May 1810, thus constituting a Board of Government and Conservation, in which the desire to break with the Crown was formed. In 1811, the Declaration of Independence Act was signed, thus forming part of the First Republic, which fell the following year.

After the patriotic victory in the Battle of Niquitao on 2 July 1813, Barinas became part of the Second Republic, which also fell the following year. Paez's campaigns ensured the patriotic victory in Barinas during the Third Republic, in which Venezuela's independence was consolidated.

Young Barineses like José Antonio Páez and Pedro Briceño Méndez were important heroes of the Independence.

=== Contemporary period ===
==== The Province of Barinas during the contemporary period ====
During the existence of Greater Colombia, there were several political-administrative changes. In 1821, the Congress of Cúcuta created the Department of Venezuela, which included Barinas. Two years later, the Congress of the Republic separated the current territory of the State of Apure from Barinas, making it a province, with the capital in Achaguas.

In 1824, in view of the Territorial Division Law, the Department of Venezuela disappeared and the Department of Apure was created, which consisted of the provinces of Barinas and Apure. Two years later, these provinces became part of the Department of Orinoco, along with Guayana.

After the dissolution of the Great Colombia, the cantons of Guanare, Ospino and Araure initiated managements to segregate themselves from the Province of Barinas, which would occur in 1851, when the National Congress erected the Province of Portuguesa.

==== Barinas State ====
During the Federal War (1859–1863), General Ezequiel Zamora maintained federalist control of all the Western Plains from Barinas, and consolidated it with the Battle of Santa Inés on 10 December 1859; after this victory, Zamora left the proclaimed state to besiege San Carlos, at which he was killed. In 1862, Barinas was renamed "Zamora" in his honor, despite recovering its original name in 1936. As for all the other provinces, Barinas became a de jure state since the proclamation of the United States of Venezuela, with the Constitution of 1864, thus repealing the ephemeral merger it had with Apure during the last year of the war.

On 30 April 1879, in accordance with the Guzmancism's plan for the reduction of states, it was proposed the conformation of the South State of the West from the territories of the states of Barinas, Carabobo, Portuguesa and Cojedes and the Department of Nirgua of the State of Yaracuy, denominated as "sections"; however, after the protest of Barinitas for the distance of Valencia as capital, such union was given excluding Carabobo and Nirgua. Barinas proposed to include Apure as part of the State.

Despite the fact that the South West later acquired the name "Zamora", the center of power was not in Barinas, but in Ospino, provisionally, and then in Guanare. At the end of the 1880s and in view of the secessionist movement of Cojedes, the idea of the disintegration of the South West in Barinas was promoted. This led to the separation of the sections of Zamora on 22 April 1899, by Ignacio Andrade's government. However, the previous degree of autonomy was not granted.

In 1989, the states were granted greater political autonomy with the country's first regional elections.

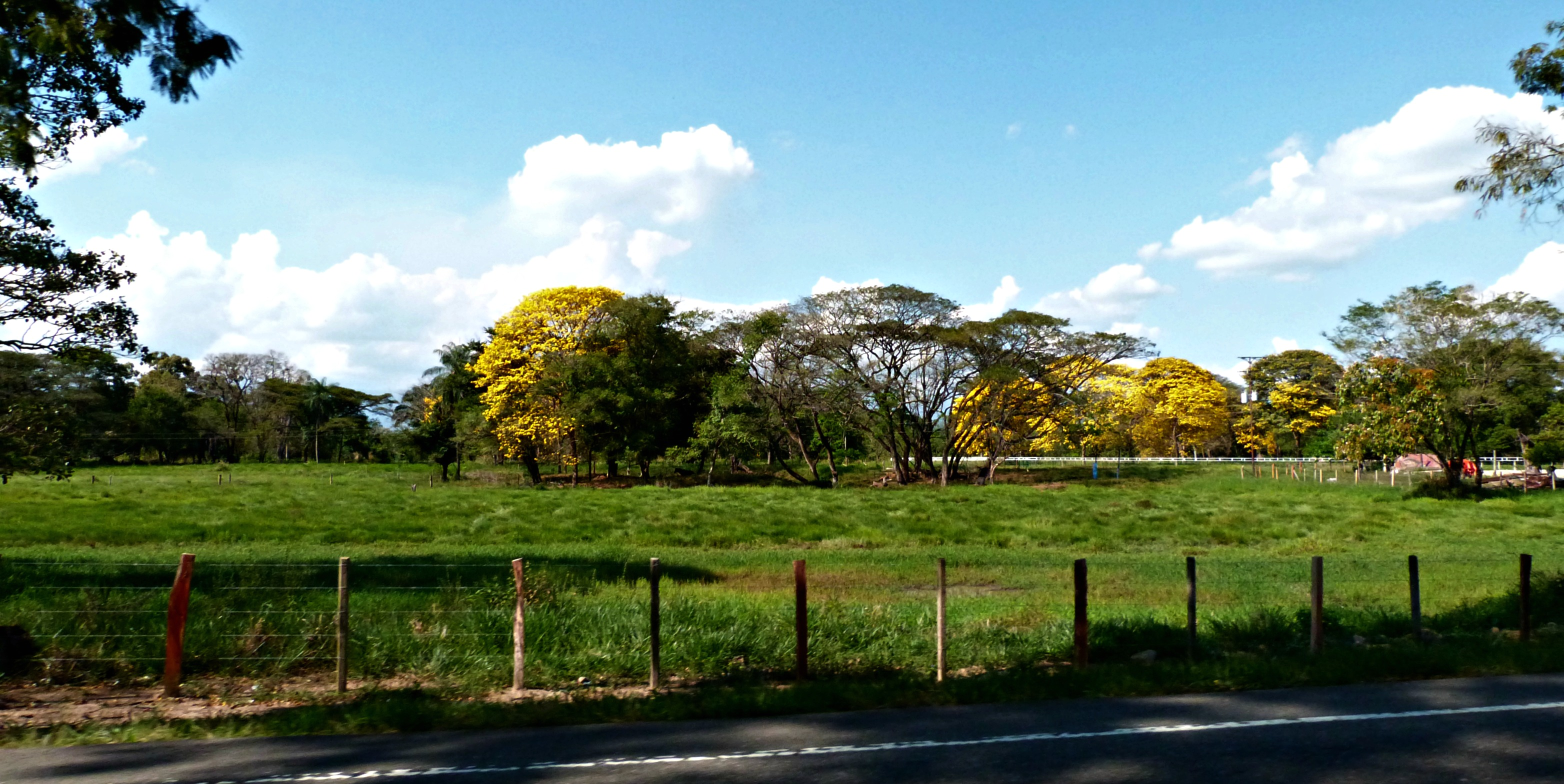
One of the many haciendas that exist in Barinas

== Geography ==
=== Relief and geology ===
The Western Plains predominate. The plains extend from the Camaguán marshes in the far east and rise in height towards the west, thus dividing into the Lower Plains, up to 120 m above sea level, the Middle Plains, up to 160 m above sea level, and the Upper Plains, up to 200 m above sea level.

This plain ends abruptly where Troncal 5 passes, in a line that goes from the town of Las Veguitas to Punta de Piedras, from which the Mérida mountain range begins, the final part of the Andina. The lowest and least rugged section of this part of the mountain range is the Sierra del Piedemonte, in which hills, small mountains, depressions and mesas predominate. The highest and most rugged parts are the Sierra Nevada, the Sierra del Tapo-Caparo and the Sierra de Calderas, with the first peak close to 4 000 m above sea level inside Barinas, and the last one has a lot of valleys. The tables of Moromoy, El Curay and Parangula are landmarks that separate the high and low parts. Two large passes are found, both to the north: the pass of the valleys and the depression of the Santo Domingo River and the pass of the Boconó River valleys.

In the Paleozoic, the Mérida mountain range was formed as an island. The sediments of this mountain range accumulated to the east and west, giving way to the formation of the Llanos, around the Mesozoic.

The most important geological formations in the state are Palmarito; Caparo, with fossiliferous shales; and Sabaneta, with sandstone.

=== Hydrography ===
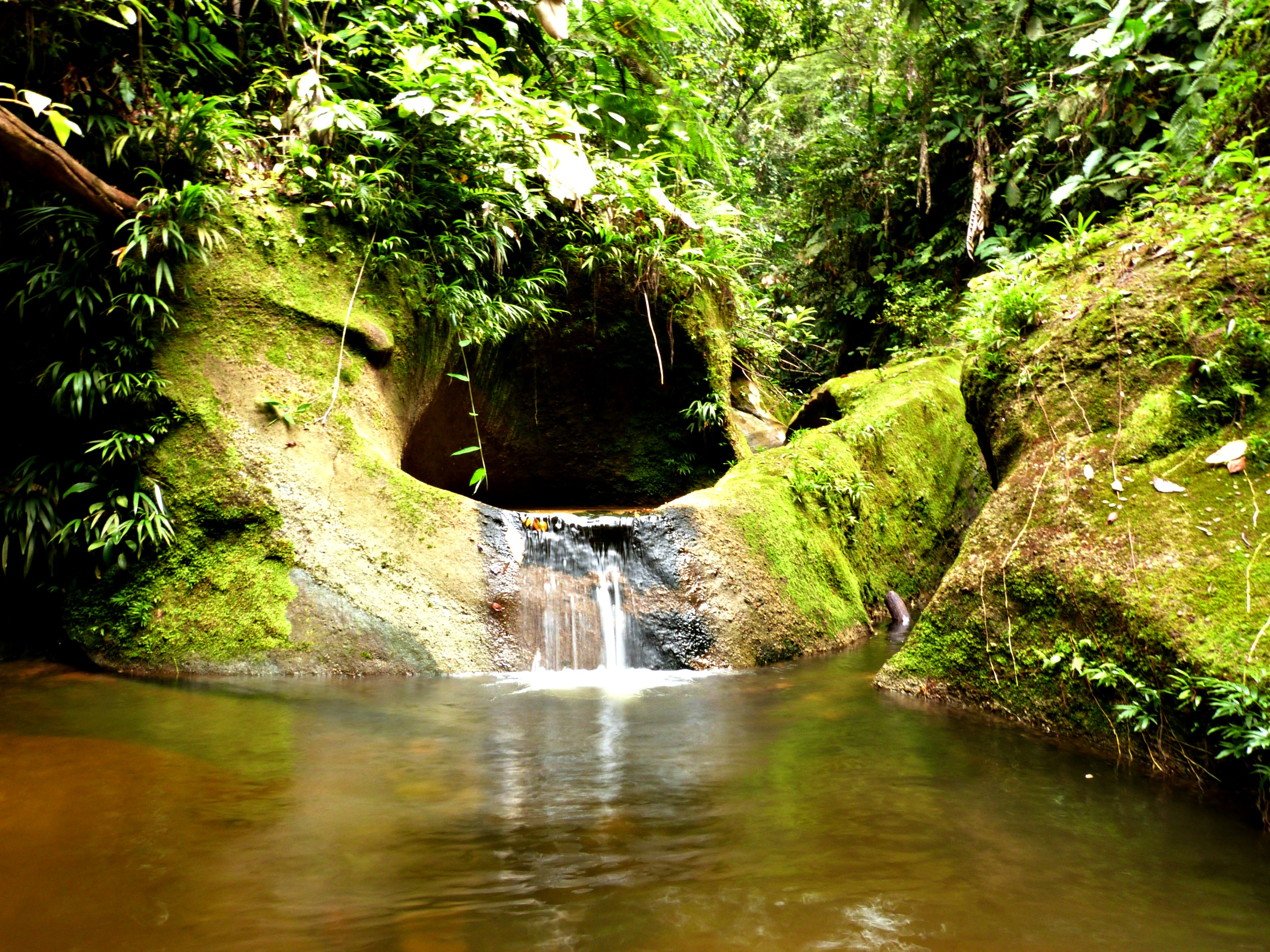
One of the many natural wells in Barinas

Barinas is characterized by an abundance of rivers, so many that its capital is considered "the capital of the rivers of Venezuela". All its rivers originate in the east of the Mérida mountain range and flow into the left bank of the Apure River, which has, for the most part, short upper and middle courses; the river floods the Llanos Bajos during rainy periods. The tributaries of the river in Barinas are the Portuguesa, Masparro, Santo Domingo, Caparo, Canaguá and Uribante Rivers, all of which are navigable. Some rivers that flow through the Piedemonte give rise to depressions around it. There are three reservoirs in the state: those of the rivers Boconó, Masparro and Caparo.

=== Climate ===
Being in the intertropical zone and extending more towards the meridians than the parallels, Barinas has a climate determined by altitude, winds and two seasons: the dry season, from October to March, and the rainy season, from April to September. Of these factors, the altitude modifies the temperatures more forcefully. The cold winds that flow from the east of the Mérida mountain range to the Llanos Altos cause the characteristic phenomenon of the Barinese wind. According to Köppen's classification, the Sierra del Tapo-Caparo and the Llanos have a savanna climate (Aw); the Piedemonte and Alto Apure, a monsoon climate (Am); the Sierra Nevada and Sierra de Calderas, a humid mountain climate (Cfbi); and the highest parts of the last two mountain ranges, a tropical alpine climate (ETH).

=== Flora and fauna ===
Barinas has two ecoregions: the Llanos and the Northern Andes, the latter being its center of endemism.

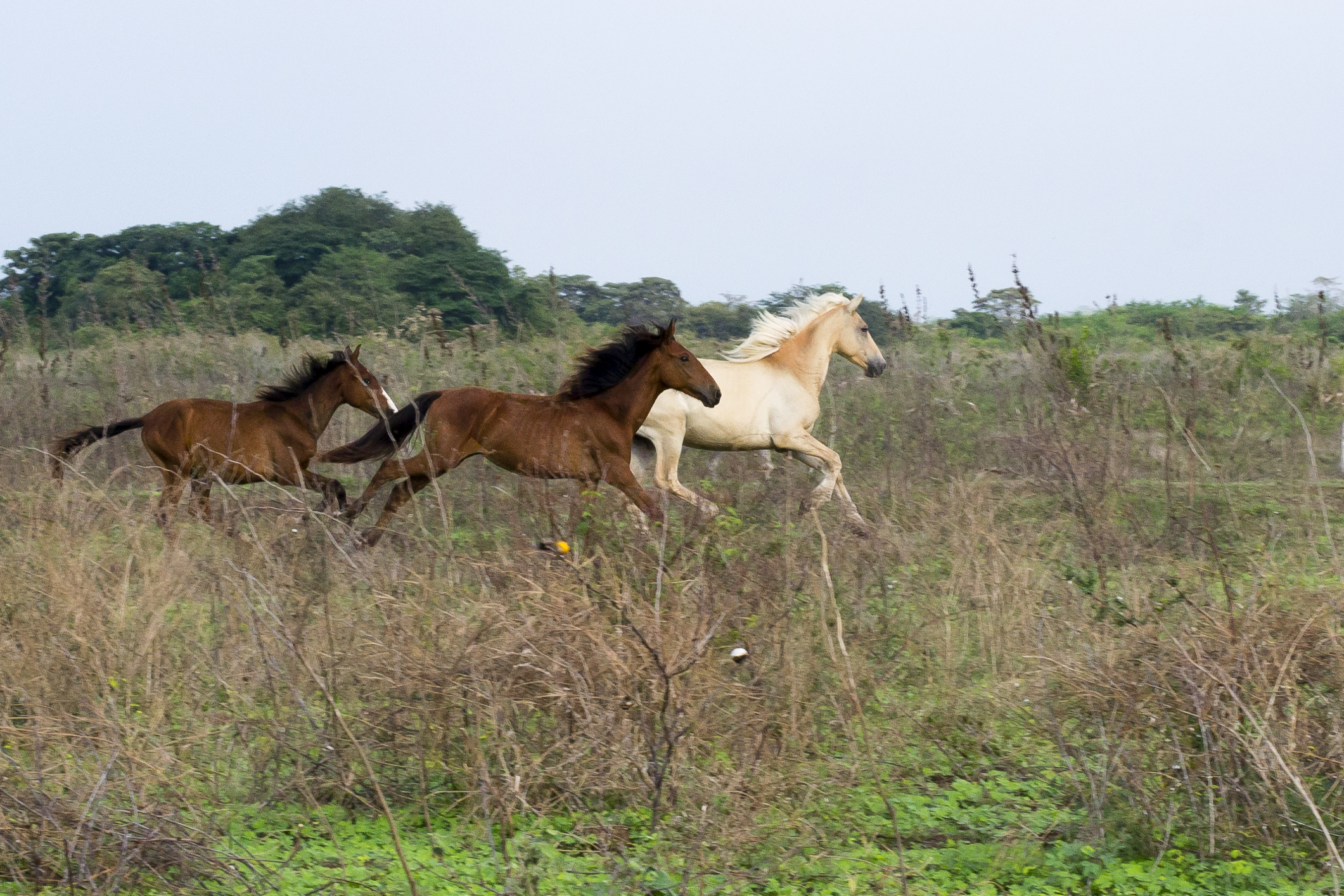
Wild horses in Barinas

The Llanos constitute extensive grasslands and abundant gallery forests. In its flora, there are many trees, such as the apamate; jabillo; samán; ceiba; mango; merecure; cañafístola llanera; and the araguaney, the national tree. There are also many palms, especially the llanera. Among the herbs, the water lilies and the mother-of-pearl and barina flowers stand out.

The Mérida mountain range has, from its highlands to its foothills, moors, tropical mountain forests and wooded savannas. Among its vegetation, the cardón, cují, bucare and frailejones are characteristic in its upper parts, while in the foothills, pardillo, granadilla, caobas and vera grows.

There are more than 450 species of birds, among which are the prey species – especially the Andean condor, herons, storks, ducks, the parachute, the Orinoco woodpecker and the carrao.

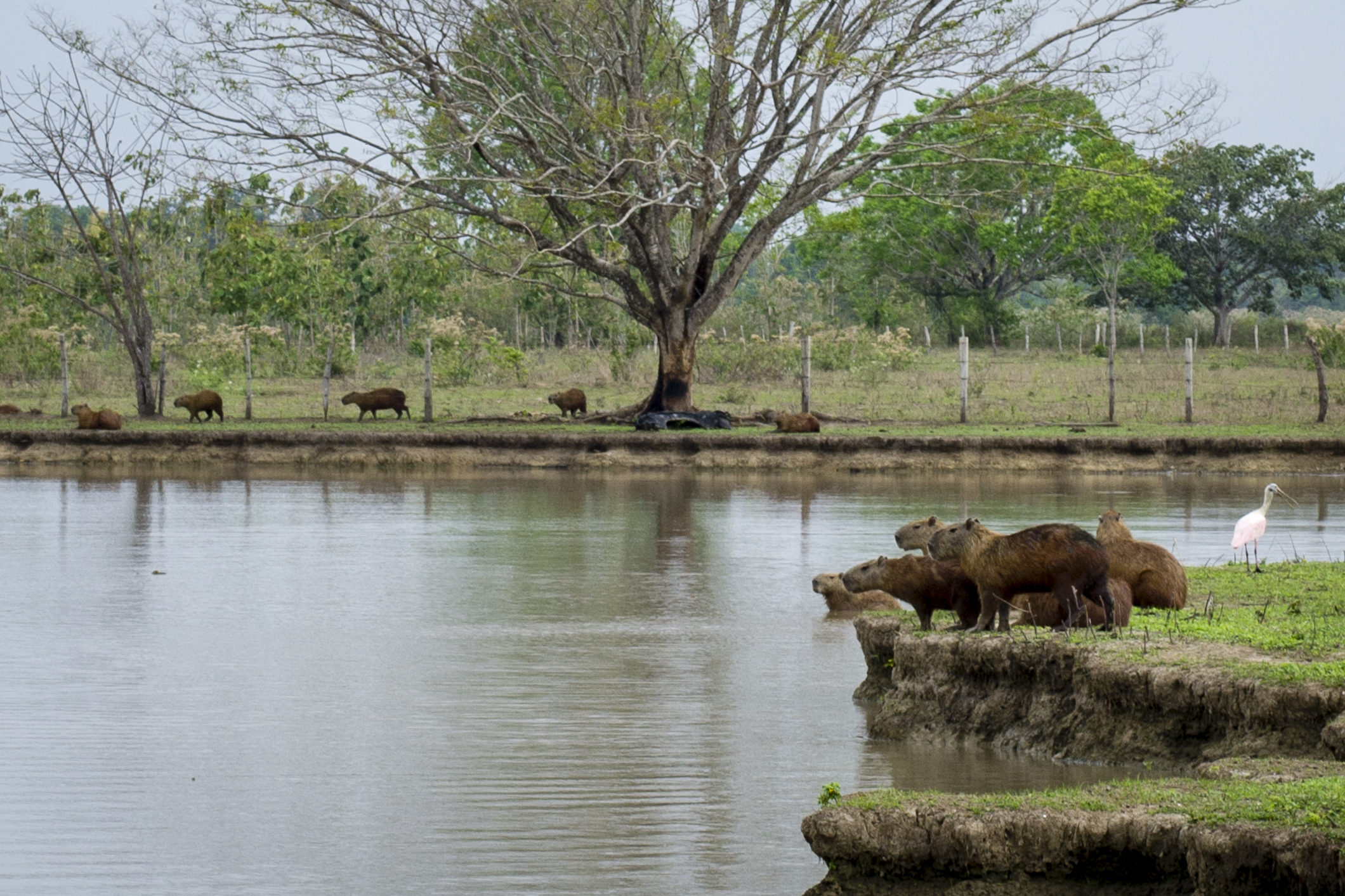
Capybaras in Barinas

Mammals are the most abundant vertebrates, highlighting the deer, foxes, otters, anteaters, honey bears, cachicamos, cunaguars, jaguars, spider monkeys, capuchins, rabbits and chigüires. Rabbits, spectacled bears, porcupines and shrews are only found in the Andes.

In the Llanos, there are many reptiles, including anacondas, podocnemids, iguanas, rattlesnakes, babo, jicotea turtles, mato real, Orinoco caiman and mapanare. The rivers are inhabited by catfish, piranhas, goldfish and electric eels.

There are also two species in danger of extinction: the morrocoy sabanero and tonina.

== Government and politics ==
Barinas is a state of Venezuela which is a presidential federal republic in the process of de facto centralisation. With its capital in the city of Barinas, the state's territory is organized into twelve municipalities. The governor, currently Sergio Garrido, is head of state and its legislative body is the Legislative Council, chaired by Desiree Contreras. The secretary general of government is Julio César Reyes. The state has an autonomous attorney general's office and a comptroller's office. It has headquarters for the electoral, moral and judicial powers, which has seventy offices. A state constitution was adopted in 2004, which can be amended or reformed at the initiative of the governor, two-thirds of the councilors, or more than 10% of the voting population. Such change requires the approval of two-thirds of the municipal councilors. The Constitution reads:

Barinas is part of the Venezuelan federation, which is symmetrical: each entity has its own legal personality, competences, income and autonomous executive and legislative power, with authorities elected by majority rule in universal, direct and secret suffrage for four-year periods and revocable by referendum. They also have their own autonomous comptroller's and procurator's office and a council for planning and coordinating public policies. Venezuela's states are obliged to maintain independence, sovereignty and territorial integrity, and to comply with and enforce the Constitution and the law.

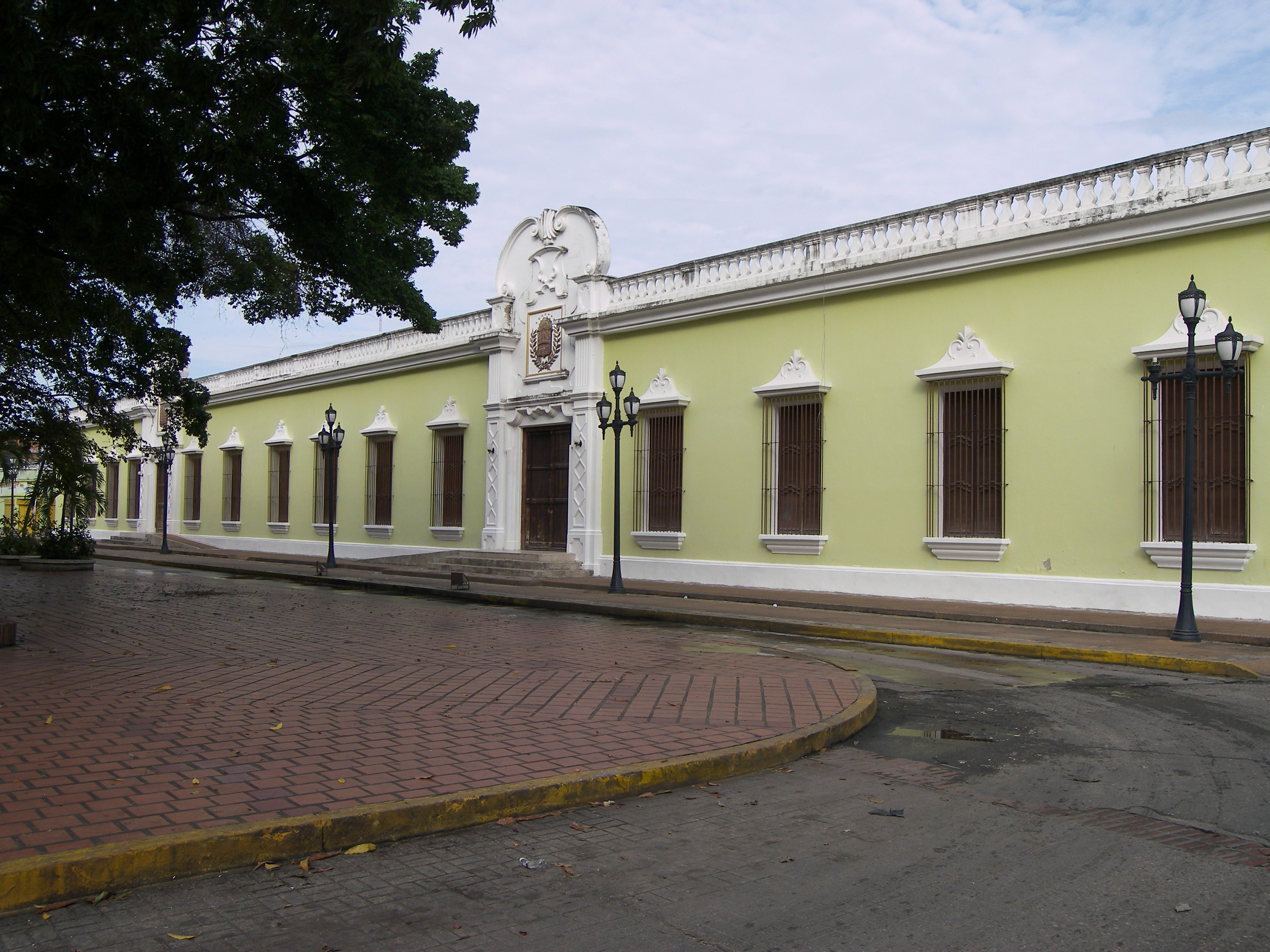
Palacio del Marques del Pumar, From 1940 to 2006 it was the seat of the State Government, the Legislative Council and the Municipal Council.

=== Executive ===
The executive power of each state is exercised by the governors. In the case of Barinas, they would have only been reelected once, until the national constitution was reformed in 2009. The governor of Barinas is elected by direct universal and secret ballots every four years and has his secretaries as assistants. According to the law, the government aims to achieve the spiritual, educational and economic elevation of the people, create a framework of incentives that allow the achievement of technological innovations that contribute to the integral development of the state and create the conditions that raise the levels of productivity.

==== Governors ====
Zenaida Gallardo was sworn in as the governor of Barinas State on 5 January 2017, replacing Adán Chávez, who was appointed as Minister for Culture on 4 January 2017. Gallardo resigned a few months later, citing health reasons. In June 2017, Argenis Chávez, brother of former president Hugo Chávez, was sworn in as governor.

Like the other 23 federal entities of Venezuela, the state maintains its own police force, which is supported and complemented by the National Police and the Venezuelan National Guard.

=== Legislative ===
The legislative power of each state in Venezuela is exercised by a legislative council, made up of seven to fifteen legislators each, who proportionally represent the population of their states and their municipalities. State legislators can be reelected only twice. The seat of the Legislative Council of Barinas is the Manuel Palacio Fajardo building; its powers are limited to those designated by the constitutions and laws.

== Territorial division ==
Barinas is divided into municipalities, which in turn are subdivided into parishes. The 12 municipalities of Barinas are organized according to population conditions (which must be greater than 10,000), economic development, capacity to generate their own income, geographical situation, historical and cultural elements and other factors. They constitute historical institutions of natural law and are considered to be the most cohesive entities after the family.

The parishes are considered to be the best places to achieve greater efficiency in the management of local governments, citizen participation and decentralization.

=== Municipalities and municipal seats ===
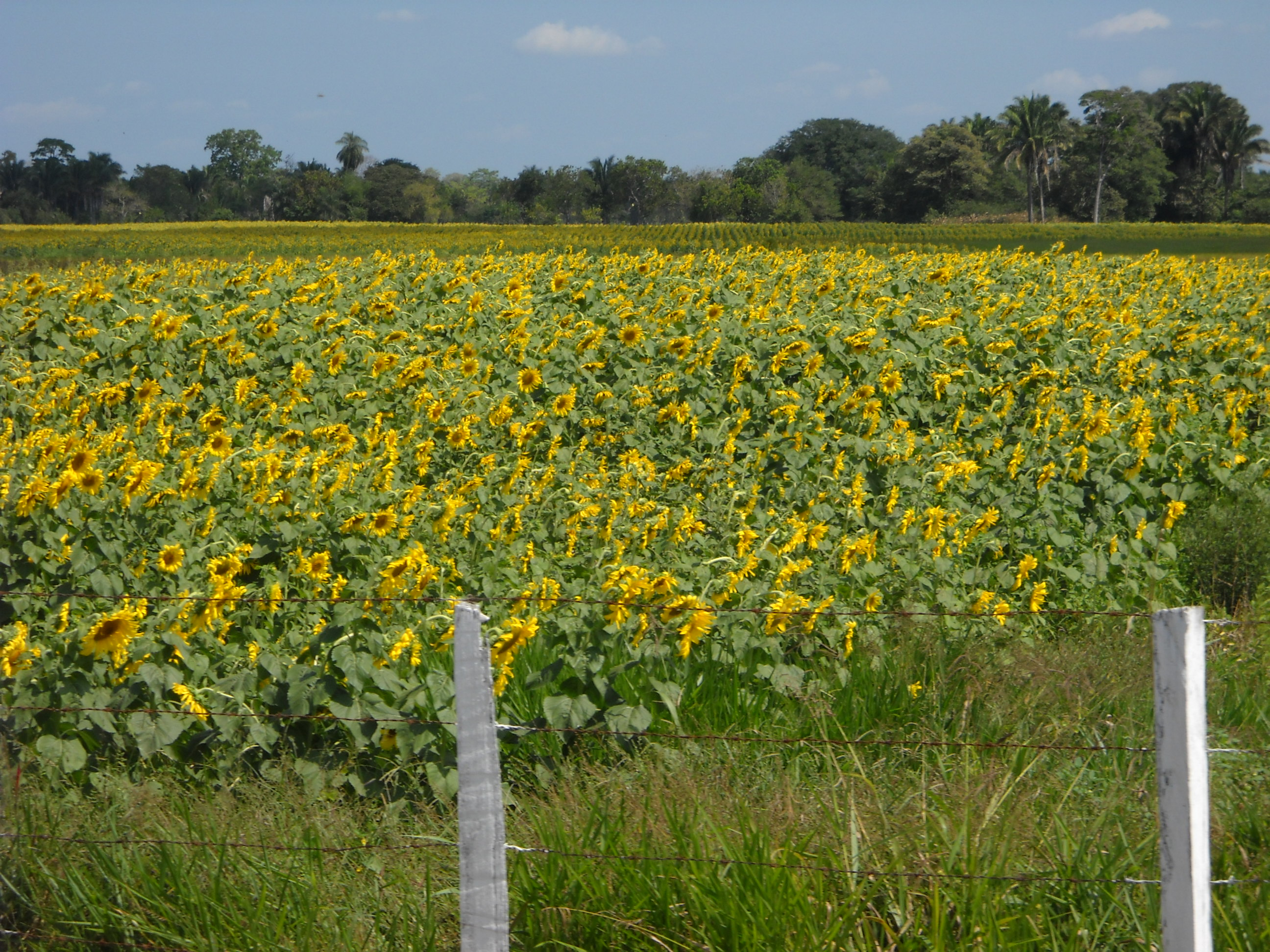
Pedraza Municipality, Barinas State

1. Alberto Arvelo Torrealba (Sabaneta)
2. Andrés Eloy Blanco (El Cantón)
3. Antonio José de Sucre (Socopó)
4. Arismendi (Arismendi)
5. Barinas (Barinas)
6. Bolívar (Barinitas)
7. Cruz Paredes (Barrancas)
8. Ezequiel Zamora (Santa Bárbara)
9. Obispos (Obispos)
10. Pedraza (Ciudad Bolivia)
11. Rojas (Libertad)
12. Sosa (Ciudad de Nutrias)

== Economy ==
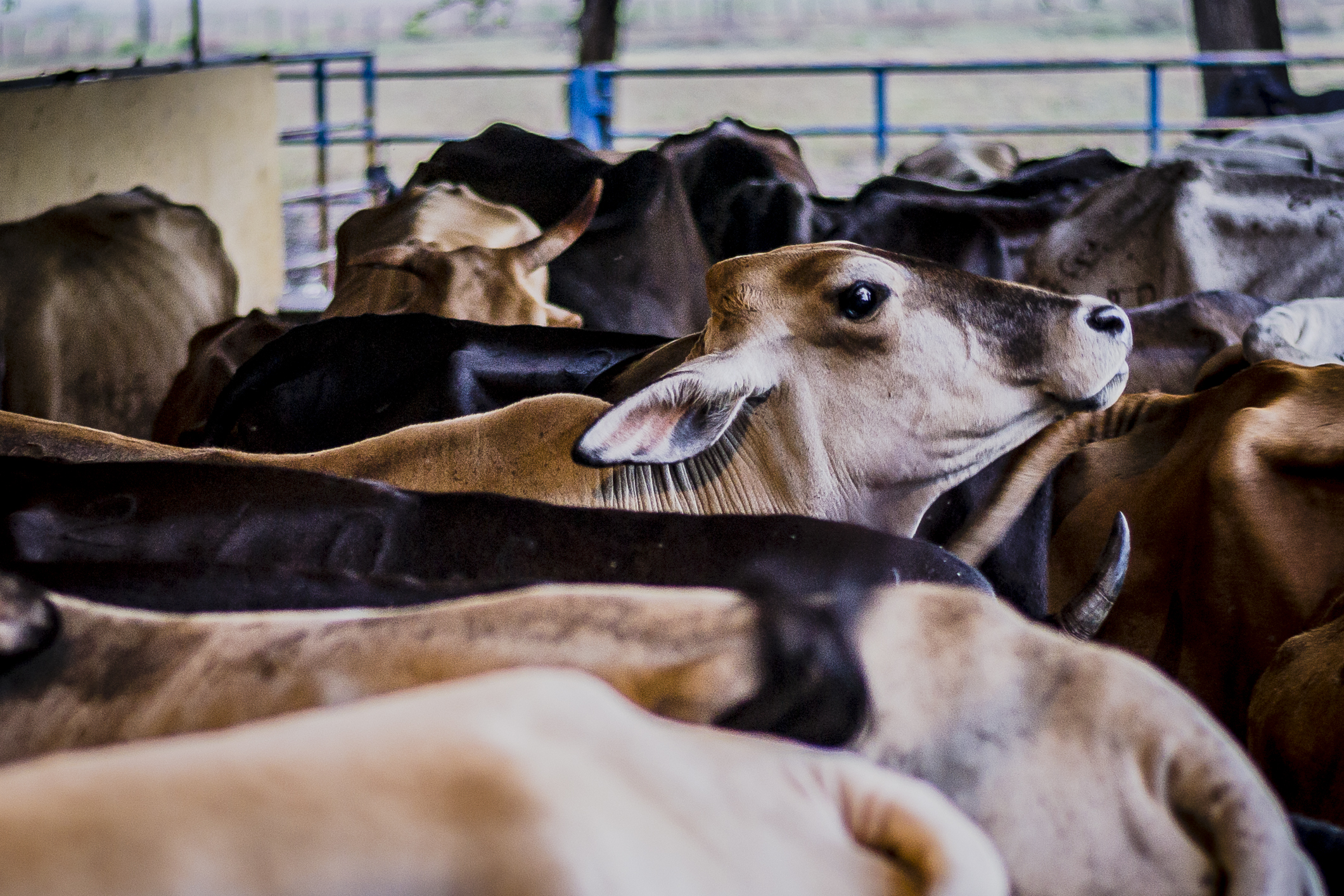
Cattle in Barinas

The mining potential is expressed by non-metallic minerals, such as limestone, sand, silicate, quartz, red clay, feldspar, gravel, silica sand and phosphorite. As for energy resources, there are hydrocarbon reserves in the southern zone of San Silvestre, where PDVSA exploits several oil fields. In 2001, Repsol YPF was awarded the Barrancas block for the production of 2 million m^{3} of free gas per day. The gas is fed to the Termobarrancas electric plant in the Obispos municipality, with a generation capacity of 450 megawatts.

Agricultural production in Barinas is very important for the local economy as well as livestock production. The fertile soils provide the necessary conditions for the production of corn, sorghum, banana, cocoa, coffee, cotton and sesame. These items are the main axis of agriculture in Barinas State.

== Tourism ==
Barinas has a contrast between landscapes of mountains, plains, rivers and streams, offering tourists a variety of options, from contemplating rare species in their habitat, to enjoying its spectacular parks and natural spas.

From the city of Barinas to the state of Mérida, passing through the municipality of Bolívar, which includes the towns of Barinitas, Altamira de Caceres and Calderas, with a pleasant climate, characteristic of the tropical rainforest.

Barinitas, the capital of the municipality, has places for tourism: the Moromoy Park for camping; the Balneario La Barinesa, which has recreational facilities; and, towards the southeast, the El Cacao Sector, for mountain biking practice. There is also the boulevard of Plaza Bolívar and the San Pedro Church. The route that leads to Altamira de Cáceres is used for bird watching because of the diversity of species.

Altamira de Cáceres is the first seat (1577) of what is today the city of Barinas. It still preserves its colonial architecture, with its historic red-roofed houses.

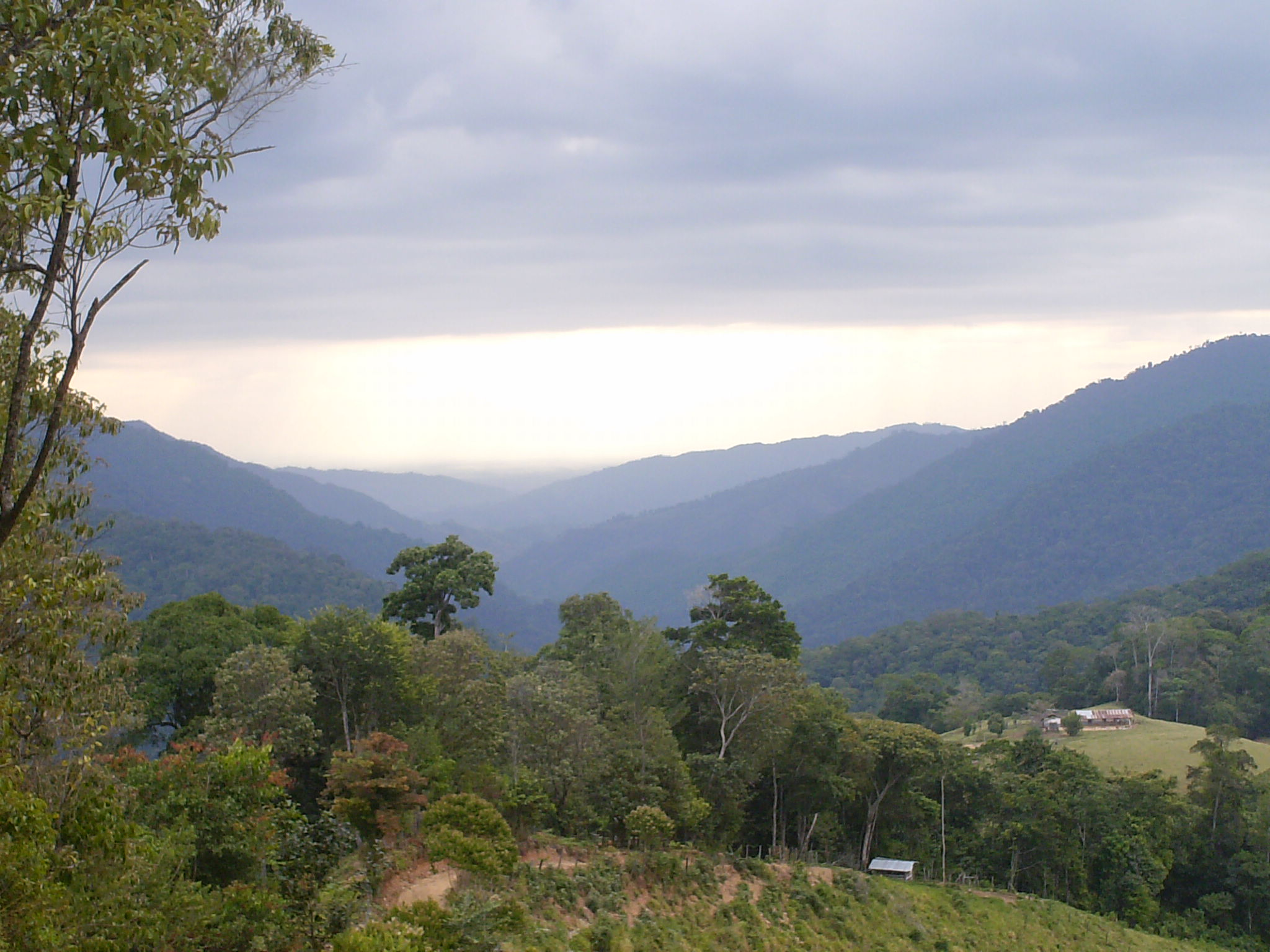
Mountain landscape in Barinas

The Plaza Bolívar was converted into a boulevard; in its surroundings, the church can be found, along with the Alfredo Arvelo Larriva House of Culture, inns, restaurants, wine cellars, bakeries, shops and handicrafts.

"Los Castillos" mill is located near the "La Bellaca" farmhouse, close to the town of Calderas; the artisan process of making panela is carried out at the mill, which was produced by the locals since past times.

In Calderas, there are natural places with recreational facilities, such as the "La Piedra del Patio" spa, on the banks of the Azul River. The house of Avelino Moreno culture and the "Centro de Enseñanza para el Desarrollo Rural" (CENDER) is located here.

Near the city of Barinas, there are two important reservoirs: the Manuel Palacio Fajardo (Masparro), located 15 minutes from the town of Barrancas, and Juan Antonio Rodríguez Domínguez (Boconó - Tucupido), located on the border with the Portuguese State; tourists can go on boat trips, kayaking, jet skiing, bird watching, and controlled sport fishing. The population of Obispos (founded in 1713) is dominated by the cultivation of mussels, corn, cotton, sorghum and forest products, in addition to livestock and oil exploitation.

Obispos has a colonial temple of San Nicolás de Bari, which was built in the 18th century, and hosts popular activities such as the joropo, corrío, coplas, tonadas, bullfighting and patron saint festivities.

Near Trunk 5 are the towns of Mijagual, Santa Rosa, Libertad, Dolores, City of Otters and Puerto de Nutrias. There are large scale plantations of oilseeds, cereals, sugar cane, tomatoes and yucca and fruit trees, as well as a livestock area.

In Sabaneta, the cultural aspect of Los Diablos Danzantes de San Hipólito stands out; in the musical aspect, there are the celebrations of the Festival de la Bandola in the town of Dolores (December), the Festival de la Libertad and La Paz (January) and the making of typical musical instruments in the town of Libertad.

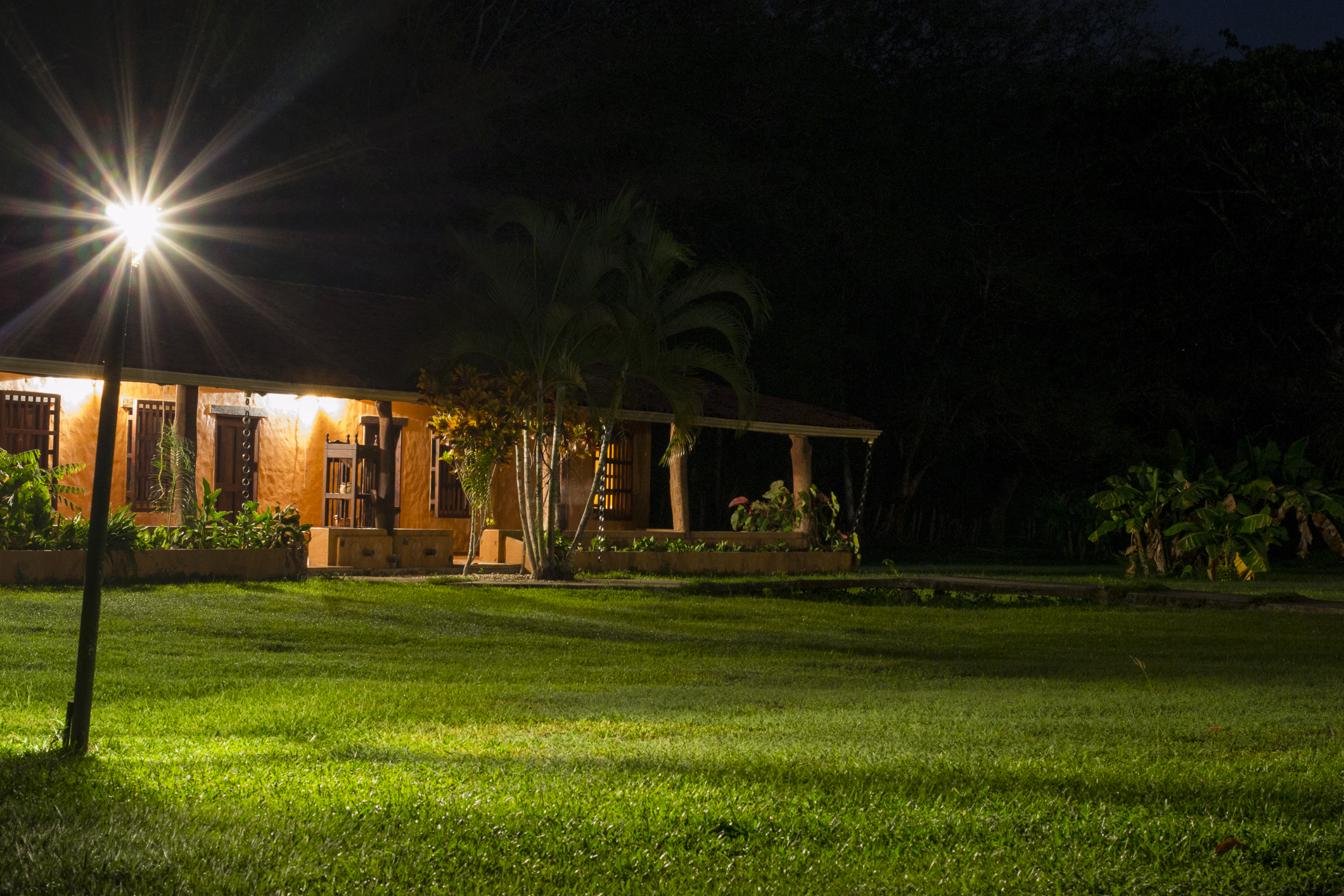
Hato Cristero, Barinas State

In El Real, in the month of January and at various times of the year, the inhabitants of this area and pilgrims from various parts of the world venerate the image of Nuestra Señora del Rosario del Real, which appeared in the mid-17th century.

Near the Paguey River is the village of San Silvestre, which, in December, celebrates its patron saint's festival in honor of San Silvestre, where bullfighting is one of the most popular tourist events in the village.

Another site of interest is the Sierra Nevada National Park located between the state of Mérida and Barinas. It is a protected ecosystem that has forests, moors, xerophilous scrubs and the highest mountains in the country, such as Pico Bolívar (5,007 m), the Humboldt Peak (4,920 m), Bompland (4,942 m), La Concha (4,920 m), El Toro (4,755 m) and El Leon (4,740 m).

The Balneario Municipal and El Balneario Río Boconó, located on the banks of the Cipe River, are natural spas surrounded by lush trees.

Around Peña Viva, there is a vast network of pre-Columbian petroglyphs that constitute the sample known in Venezuela today.

Barinas has a botanical garden located within the Universidad Nacional Experimental de Los Llanos Ezequiel Zamora.

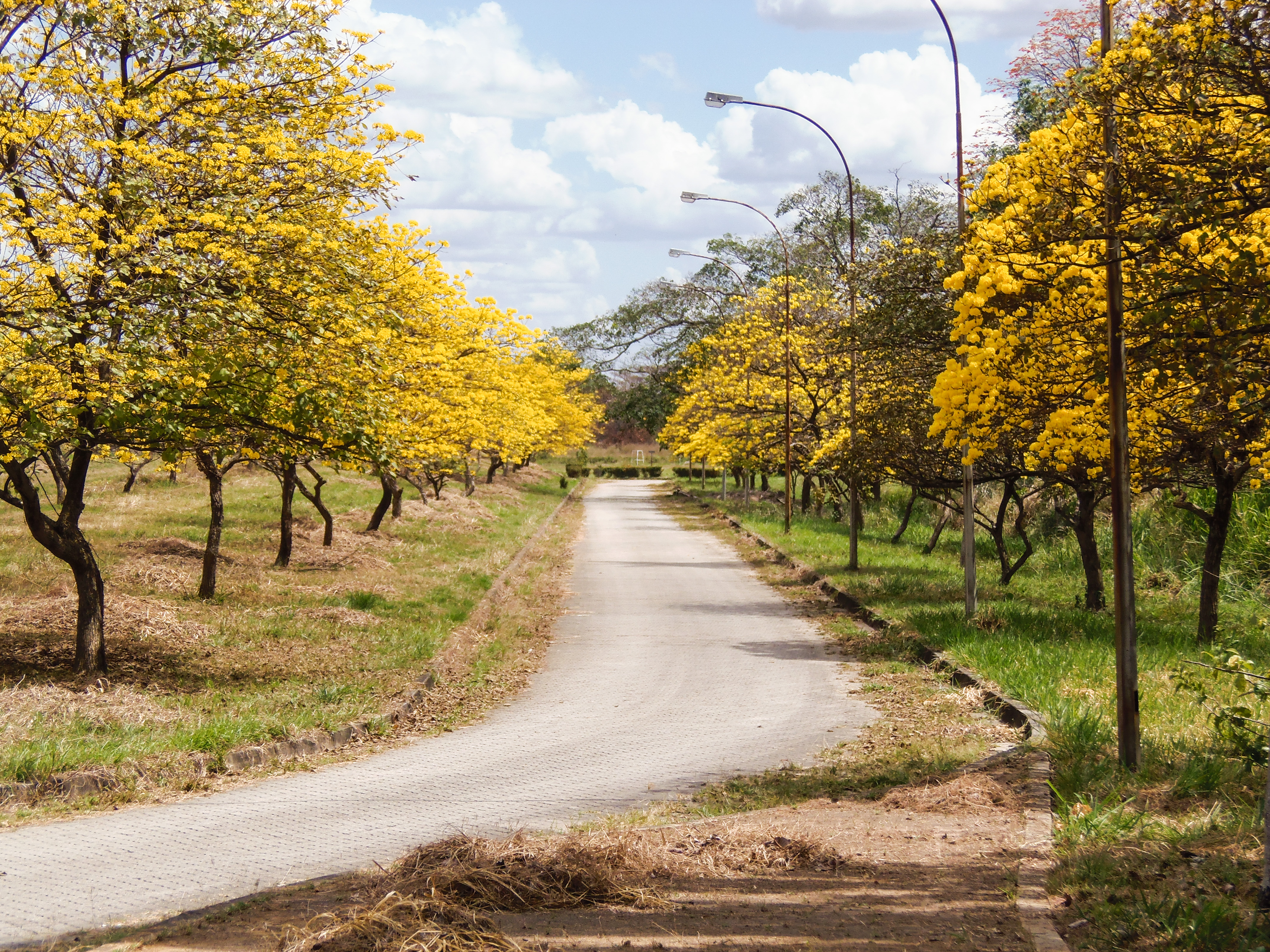
Unellez Botanical Garden

=== Natural Heritage ===
- Balneario Municipal
- Balneario Río Boconó
- Canagua
- Bruzual Bridge
- Cerro el Gobernador
- Cave los Diablos
- Cave los Corredores
- Unellez Botanical Garden
- La Acequia
- La Piedra del Patio
- La Yuca Parque
- La Carolina
- Los Samanes Park
- Moromoy Park
- Sierra Nevada National Park
- Tapo-Caparo National Park
- Sabana de Anaro
- Masparro River
- Pagüey River
- Santo Domingo River
- La Yuca River

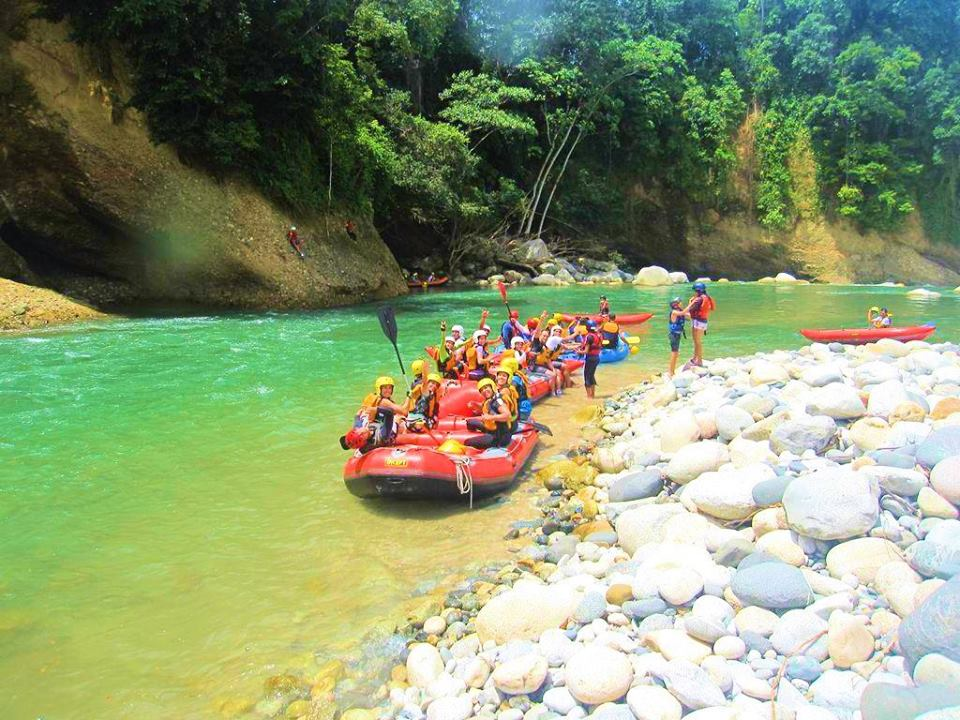
La Acequia River

=== Outstanding buildings ===
- House of Culture
- House of the Poet Lazo Martí
- Alfredo Arvelo Larriva Cultural Center
- Virgen del Real Tourist Complex
- El Calvario Manuel Reservoir
- Church of St. Nicholas of Bari of Obispos
- Church of the Immaculate Conception
- Alberto Arvelo Torrealba Museum
- El Marqués Palace
- Rafael Calvo Municipal Art Workshop

== Demographics ==
Historical population
Year	Pop.	±% p.a.
1873	59,449	—
1881	56,765	−0.58%
1891	62,696	+1.00%
1920	55,055	−0.45%
1926	57,341	+0.68%
1936	56,193	−0.20%
1941	62,959	+2.30%
1950	85,944	+3.52%
1961	139,271	+4.49%
1971	231,046	+5.19%
1981	326,166	+3.51%
1990	424,491	+2.97%
2001	624,508	+3.57%
2011	854,391	+3.18%
Source: "XIV CENSO NACIONAL DE POBLACIÓN Y VIVIENDA - Resultados por Entidad Federal y Municipio del Estado Barinas" (PDF). Instituto Nacional de Estadística.

In Barinas State, the rural population had traditionally predominated; in 1950, it was estimated that the rural population corresponded to 84.8% of the total population of Barinas. The state had 424,491 inhabitants according to the 1990 census. The population estimate for 2015 is 901,129.

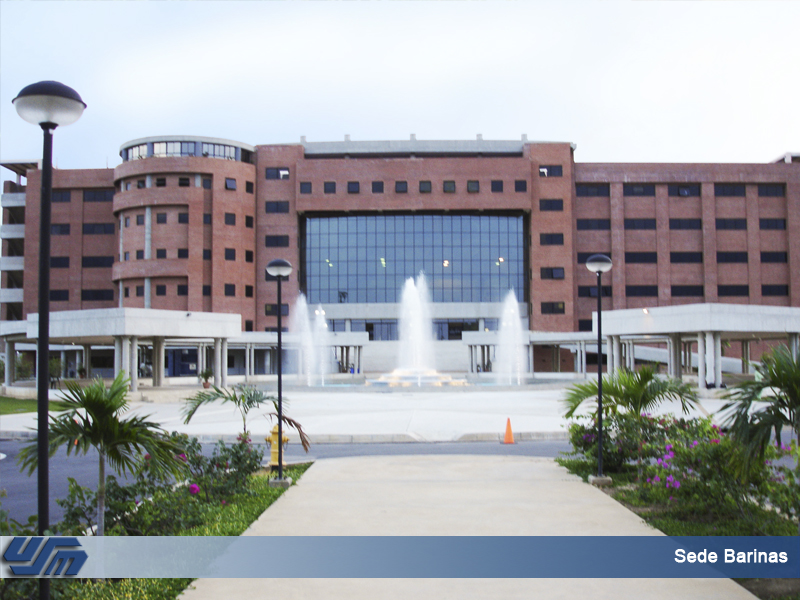
Santa María University, Barinas

The state has the second-largest amount of Venezuelan Colombians with more than 300,000, after the State of Táchira. Most of these people live in the city of Barinas. This immigration, which has lasted for more than 40 years, is mainly due to the Colombian conflict.

=== Race and ethnicity ===
According to the 2011 census, the racial composition of the population was:

Racial composition	Population	%
Mestizo	—N/a	54.1
White	344,265	41.9
Black	21,363	2.6
Other race	—N/a	1.4

== Sports ==
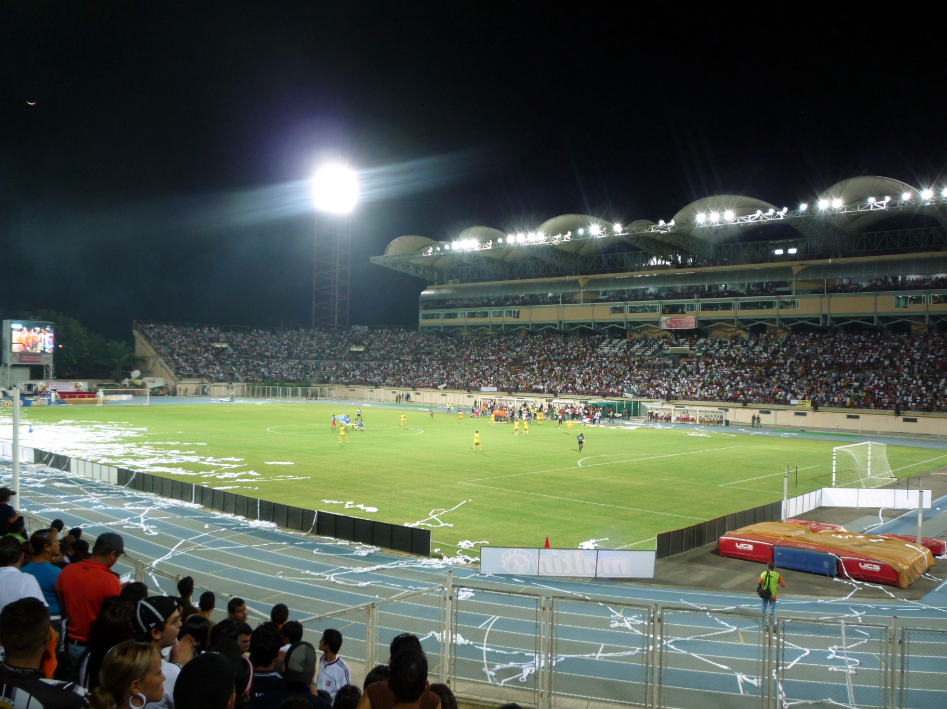
Agustín Tovar Stadium, Barinas

The state of Barinas has a First Division football club, Zamora Fútbol Club, founded on 2 February 1977, and they reside in La Carolina Stadium, which was one of the stadiums used for the 2007 Copa America, held in Venezuela.

In 2007, Barinas hosted the second leg of the Nissan South American Cup between Zamora F.C. and Olmedo of Ecuador, which the visiting team won two goals to one, which was the first international match of Zamora F.C.. Subsequently, it hosted three South American Cup matches and three editions of the Copa Libertadores.

In 2011, Zamora F.C. won the Clausura Championship and was runner-up in Venezuela. In mid 2013, they won the championship for the second time, and the Venezuelan Professional Football Tournament against Deportivo Anzoategui. In 2013, Zamora Football Club won its first absolute championship, the 2013 Closing Tournament. In May 2014, it won its Absolute Bicampionship vs Mineros de Guayana, and in December 2016, it got its third star (absolute championship) in five years after being crowned champion in the Opening Tournament vs Deportivo Anzoátegui, and winning the Absolute Final vs Zulia FC.

The Varyna Sport Volleyball Club of the national professional volleyball league in Venezuela was also created in 2011.

In baseball, the Petroleros de Barinas Team was established, which plays in the Venezuelan national parallel league, where it has been proclaimed champion twice.

== Transport ==
The state's road network is the main means of communication, both internally and with the rest of the country. This road has 7,094.5 km of trunk roads of which only 15% are paved, so it is advisable to travel in all-terrain vehicles. Trunk 5 is the most important road axis and communicates Barinas with the states of Portuguesa, Táchira and Apure.

== See also ==
- States of Venezuela
