= Masparro River =

Coordinates: 8.0706°N 69.4311°W

Location
- Country: Venezuela

Masparro River is a river of Venezuela. It is part of the Orinoco River basin.

== See also ==
- List of rivers of Venezuela
