= Barinas, Barinas =

Barinas
- City
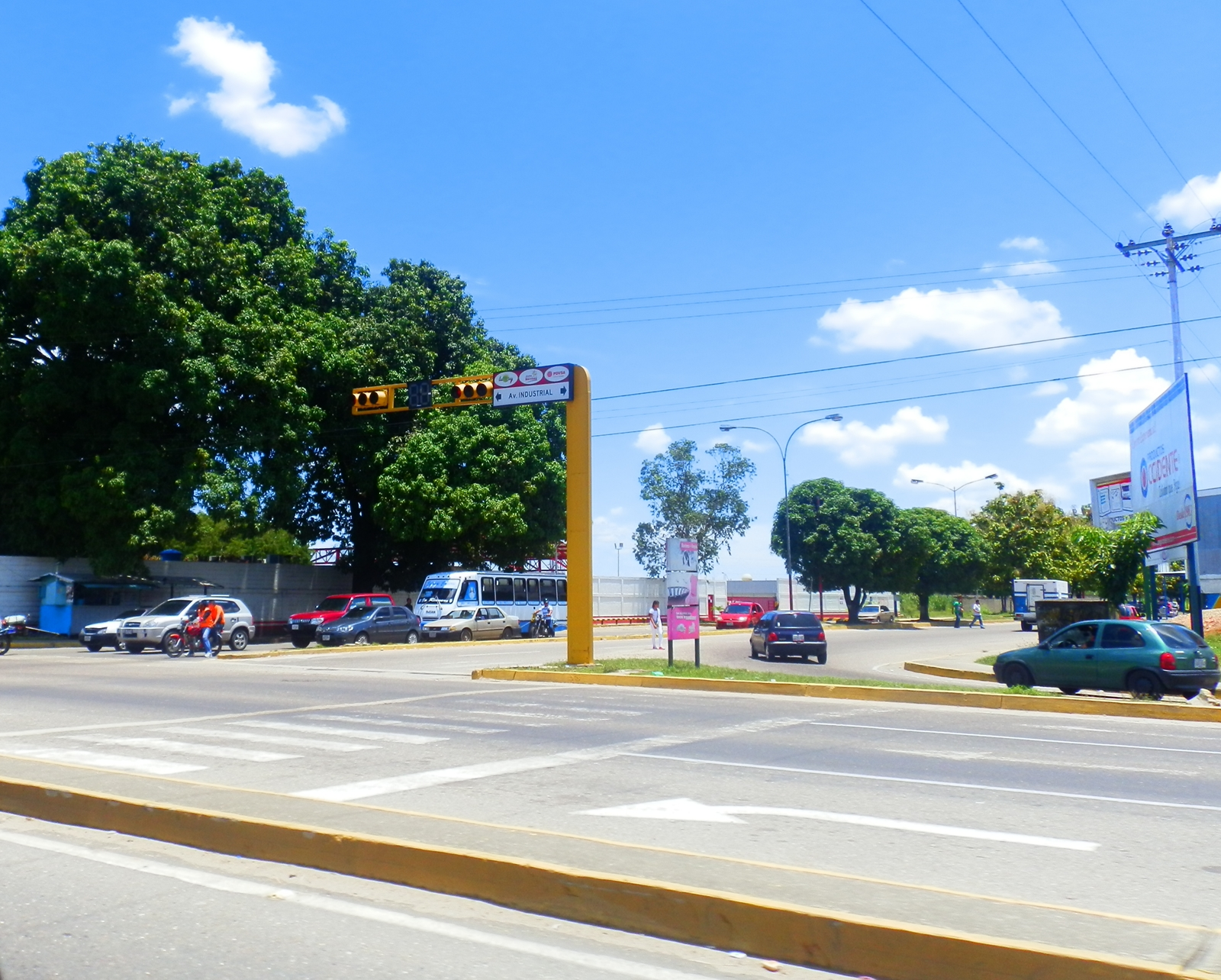
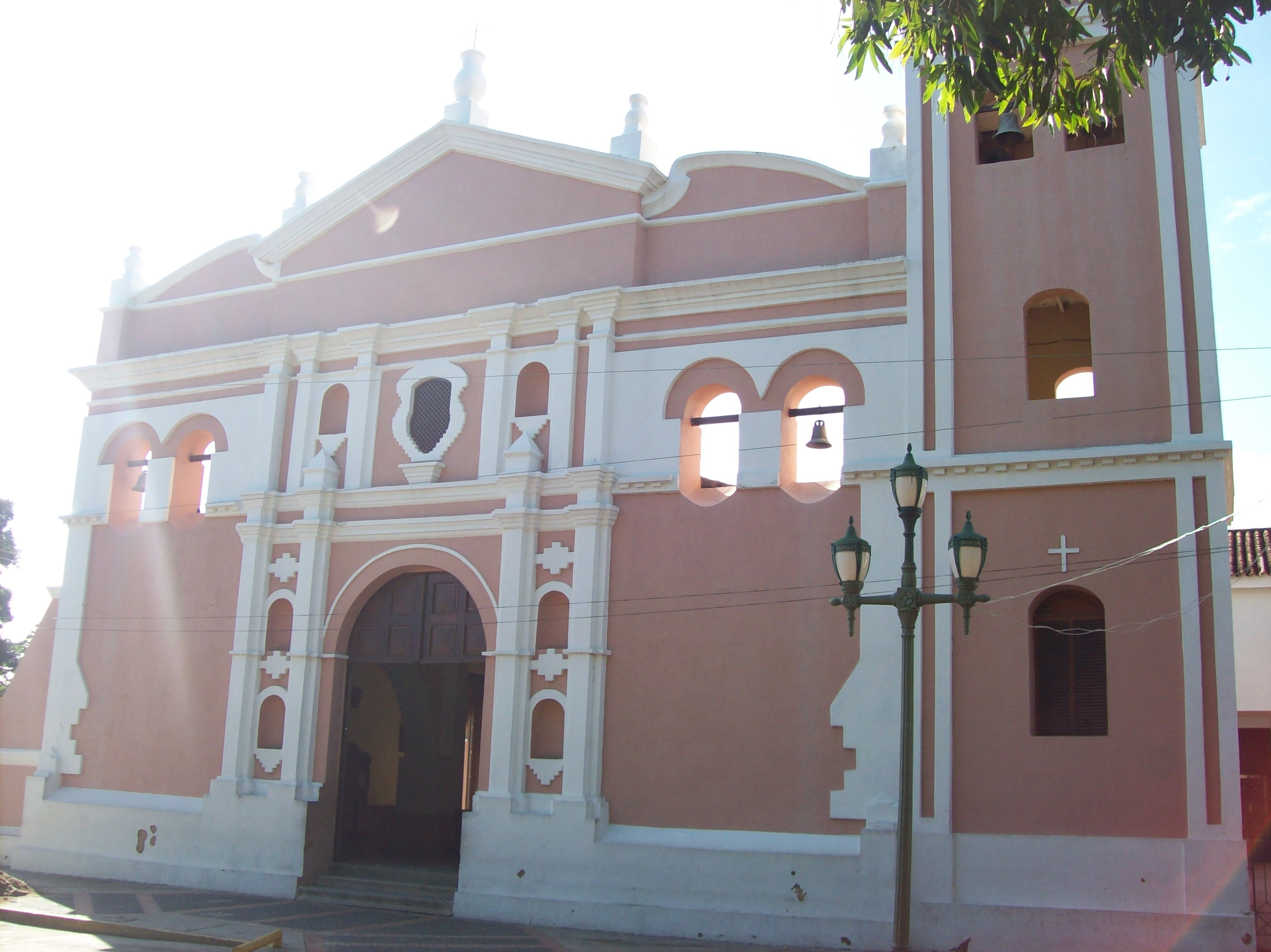
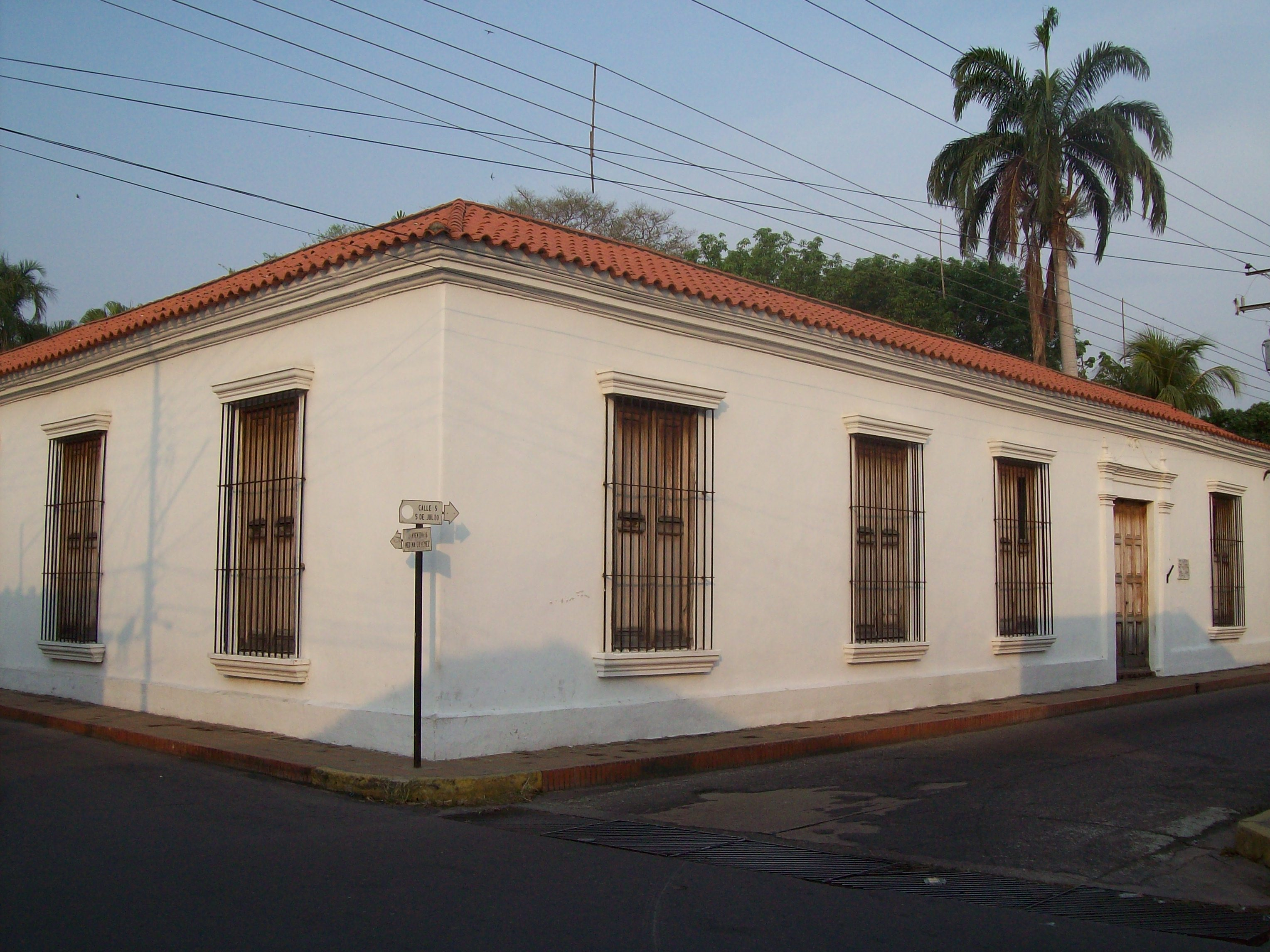
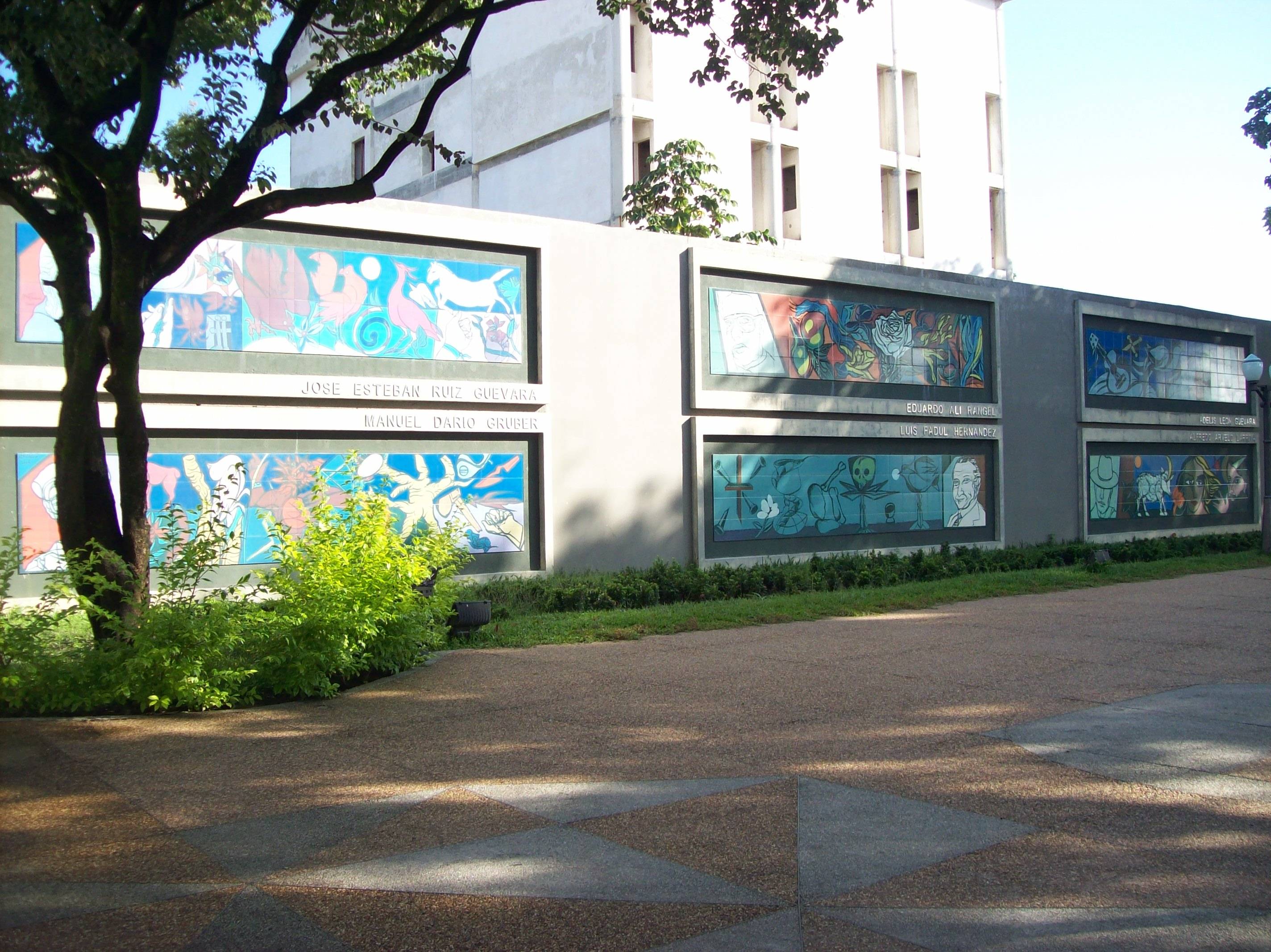
- Street in Barinas, Barinas Cathedral, House in Medína Jiménez avenue (Historical center) and Luis Razetti square.

- Flag Coat of arms

- Location within Venezuela Location within South America
- Coordinates: 08°38′N 70°12′W
- Country: Venezuela
- State: Barinas
- Municipality: Barinas Municipality
- Founded: 30 June 1577

Government
  - Mayor: Jose Luis Machin

Area
  - City: 322.71 km^{2} (124.60 sq mi)
- Elevation: 187 m (614 ft)

Population (2022)
  - City: 503.000
  - Density: 1.5587/km^{2} (4.0369/sq mi)
  - Metro: 615.000
- Time zone: UTC−4 (VET)
- Postal code: 5201
- Area code: 0273
- Climate: Aw
- Demonym: Barinés
- Website: www.alcaldiabarinas.gob.ve

Barinas (Spanish pronunciation: [baˈɾinas]) is a city in west central Venezuela. According to the 2011 census, its population is 503,442. It is the capital of the Barinas Municipality and the State of Barinas. The city of Barinas is known as the capital of the Llanos.

== History ==
The original city was founded under the name Altamira de Caceres on June 30, 1577, by Captain Juan Andres Varela fulfilling orders of the governor of La Grita Francisco de Cáceres, who had founded this Andean city and established it governorate in 1576.

In 1786 Barinas state was established in the territories of the existing states of Barinas and Apure. The city became the capital of the state and an important bastion of the patriots during the War of Independence. Cristóbal Mendoza, the first President of Venezuela, lived and practiced his profession in Barinas.

== Etymology ==
The name of the city comes from an indigenous word which identifies a strong wind that occurs during the rainy season, from the valleys of Santo Domingo.

== Geography ==
The city is located in the northwest part of the state, along the river Santo Domingo in the Andean foothills about 165 km from the city of Mérida and 525 km from Caracas. The city has about 503,000 inhabitants and is the most populous in the state of Barinas and one of the largest Venezuelan llanos cities alongside Calabozo, Acarigua-Araure, Guanare and San Fernando de Apure. The city is located about 188 meters above sea level.

=== Climate ===
Barinas experiences a tropical savanna climate (Köppen: Aw) characterized by consistently hot temperatures throughout the year and a distinct wet and dry season pattern.

Barinas experiences a wet season from April to November, with rainfall peaking in June, and a dry season from December to March. The total annual precipitation is 1,650 millimetres (65 in). March, before the onset of the rainy season, is the hottest month, with an average high temperature above 35 °C (95 °F), while June through August in the wet season are the coolest months, with high temperatures close to 31 °C (88 °F).

Climate data for Barinas (Barinas Airport) (1991–2020)
Month	Jan	Feb	Mar	Apr	May	Jun	Jul	Aug	Sep	Oct	Nov	Dec	Year
Record high °C (°F)	40.0 (104.0)	40.5 (104.9)	39.9 (103.8)	39.2 (102.6)	37.7 (99.9)	35.9 (96.6)	37.9 (100.2)	38.3 (100.9)	35.9 (96.6)	38.3 (100.9)	36.4 (97.5)	37.5 (99.5)	40.5 (104.9)
Mean daily maximum °C (°F)	34.0 (93.2)	34.9 (94.8)	35.2 (95.4)	33.8 (92.8)	32.5 (90.5)	31.0 (87.8)	31.0 (87.8)	31.6 (88.9)	31.9 (89.4)	32.1 (89.8)	32.3 (90.1)	33.2 (91.8)	32.8 (91.0)
Daily mean °C (°F)	27.4 (81.3)	28.4 (83.1)	29.2 (84.6)	28.6 (83.5)	27.5 (81.5)	26.4 (79.5)	26.0 (78.8)	26.3 (79.3)	26.3 (79.3)	26.9 (80.4)	27.0 (80.6)	27.2 (81.0)	27.3 (81.1)
Mean daily minimum °C (°F)	22.4 (72.3)	23.2 (73.8)	24.4 (75.9)	24.6 (76.3)	23.9 (75.0)	23.1 (73.6)	22.7 (72.9)	22.8 (73.0)	23.2 (73.8)	23.3 (73.9)	23.5 (74.3)	22.9 (73.2)	23.3 (73.9)
Record low °C (°F)	15.7 (60.3)	17.5 (63.5)	19.6 (67.3)	20.7 (69.3)	19.4 (66.9)	19.3 (66.7)	19.7 (67.5)	19.0 (66.2)	13.1 (55.6)	19.8 (67.6)	20.0 (68.0)	17.8 (64.0)	13.1 (55.6)
Average precipitation mm (inches)	16.4 (0.65)	19.2 (0.76)	46.6 (1.83)	132.6 (5.22)	201.3 (7.93)	275.4 (10.84)	208.4 (8.20)	213.7 (8.41)	221.9 (8.74)	182.9 (7.20)	102.1 (4.02)	27.1 (1.07)	1,647.6 (64.87)
Average precipitation days (≥ 1.0 mm)	1.6	2.2	4.7	10.0	13.8	16.5	15.8	14.7	12.2	11.3	7.7	2.9	113.4
Source: NOAA

== Economy ==
The city has become an important administrative centre being the headquarters of major educational institutions such as the National Experimental University of the Western Plains "Ezequiel Zamora" and the more immediate market for everything produced in the state both in the field of agriculture and animal husbandry and oil exploitation. In recent years an important tourist industry has emerged in the city since it has served as a base or point of entry to all eco-tourism locations in the region of Western Plains.

LAI - Línea Aérea IAACA, an airline, had its headquarters on the grounds of Barinas Airport in Barinas.

== Transport ==
The city has bus transportation, consisting of 5 lines that run throughout the city with over 80 different routes. It also has a large number of taxis or rental cars providing additional transportation services in the city.

Barinas International Airport serves Barinas with its two runways in the form of the letter "L".

== Sights ==
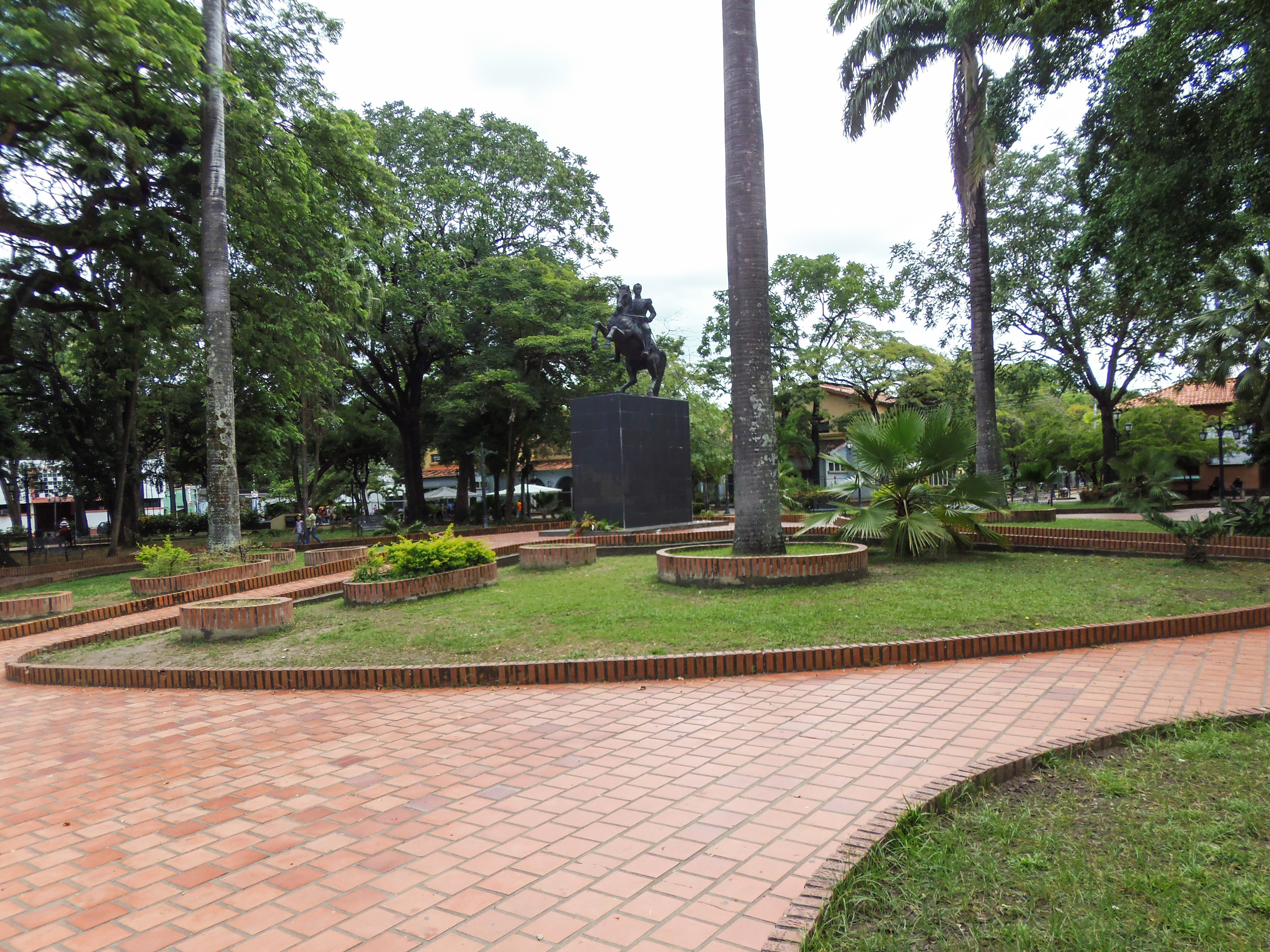
Bolívar Square in Barinas.

- The Marques Palace
- Museum Alberto Arvelo Torrealba
- Cathedral of Our Lady of Pilar of Zaragoza and Santiago
- Santo Domingo River
- Squares: Student's Square, Bolivar Square, Zamora Square, Francisco de Miranda Square, Poet's Square
- Walk of the Trujillanos
- The Federation Park
- Los Mangos Park
- Business Centers: C.C. Cima, C.C. El Dorado, C.C. Forum, C.C. Vemeca.
- Olympic Stadium Agustin Tovar "La Carolina"
- Botanical Garden of Unellez
- Punto Fresco Roundabout
- The house of Brutalis

== Gallery ==
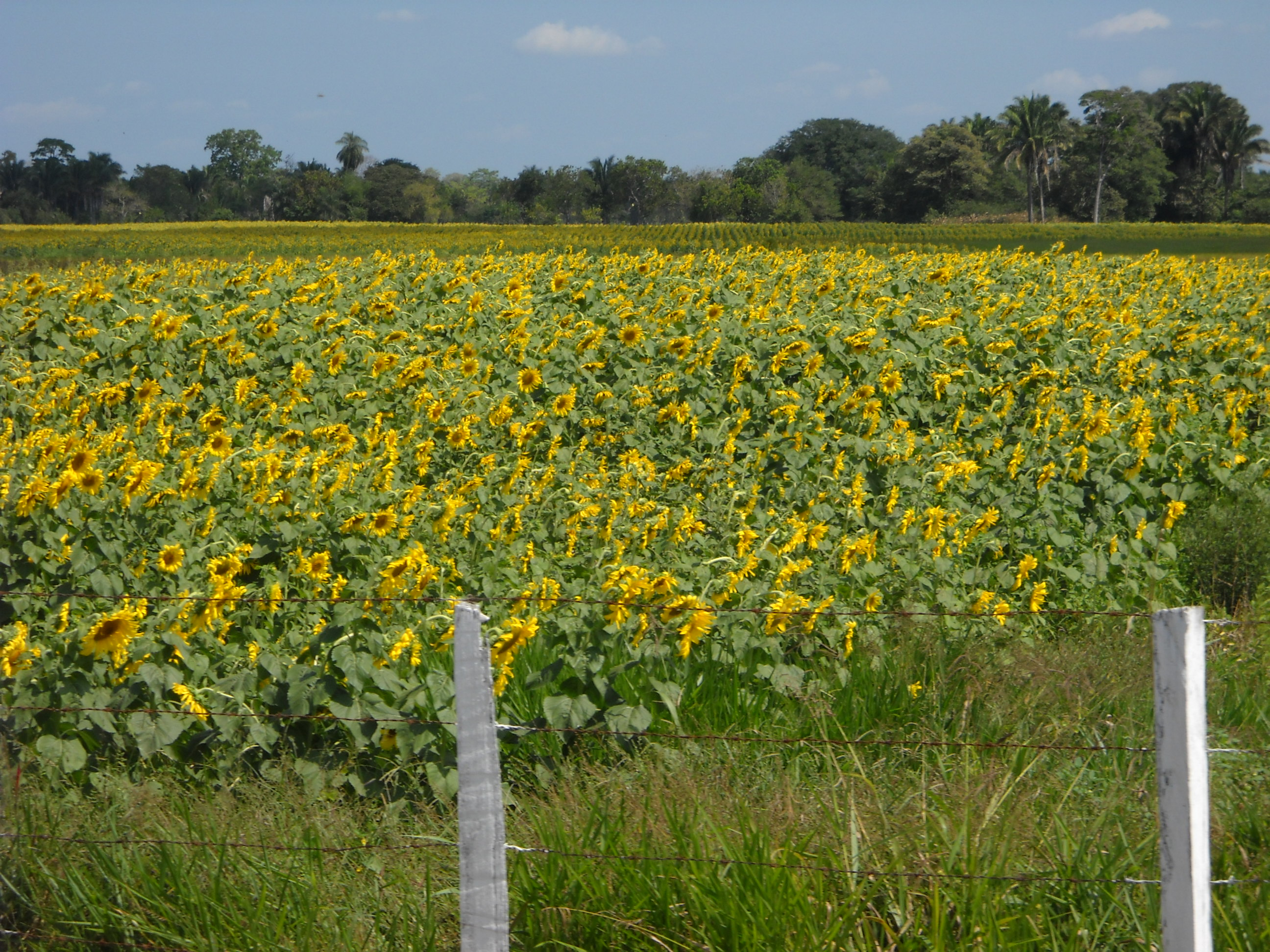
Sowing Sunflower in Barinas

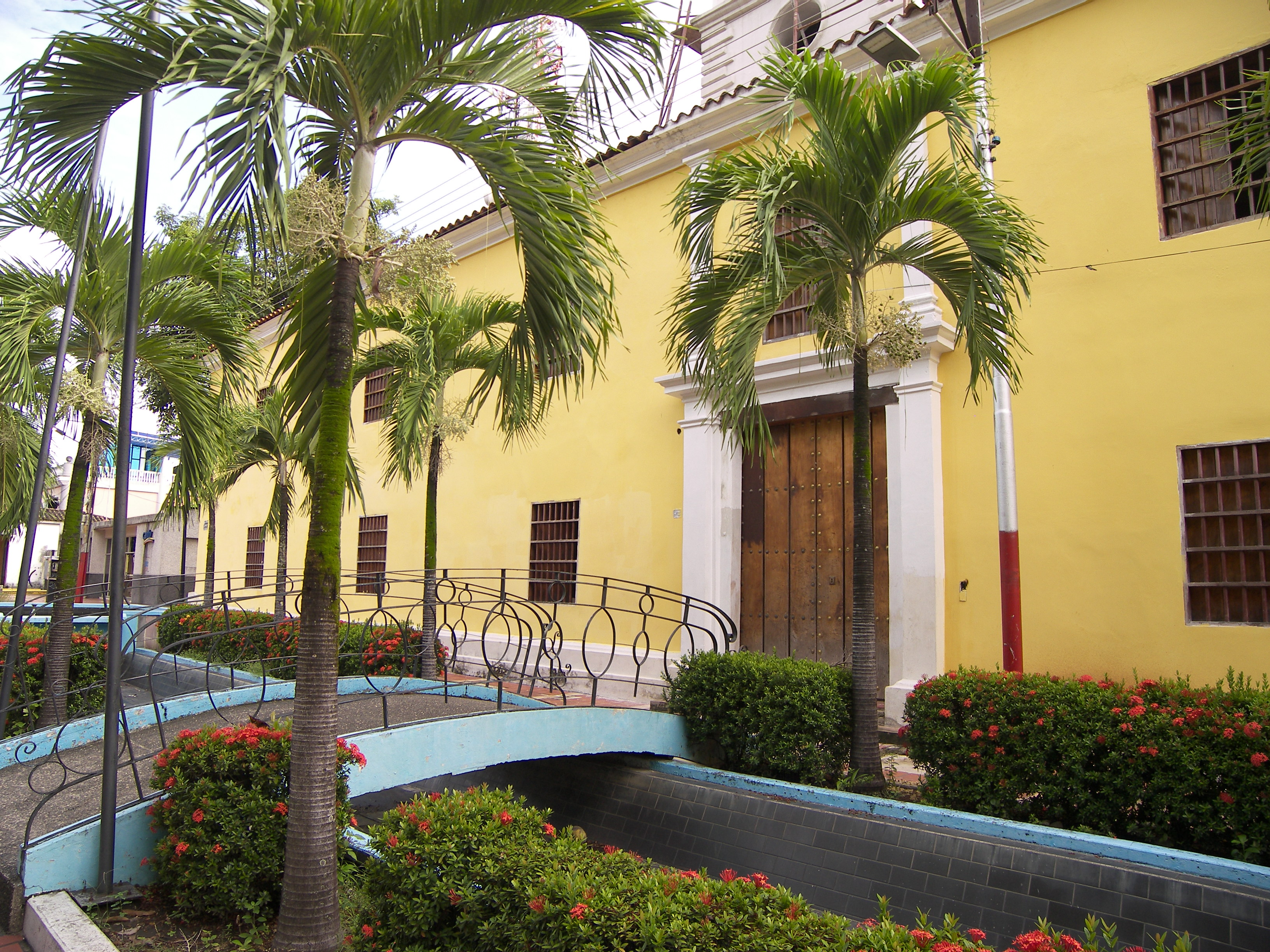
House of Culture Napoleon Sebastian Arteaga

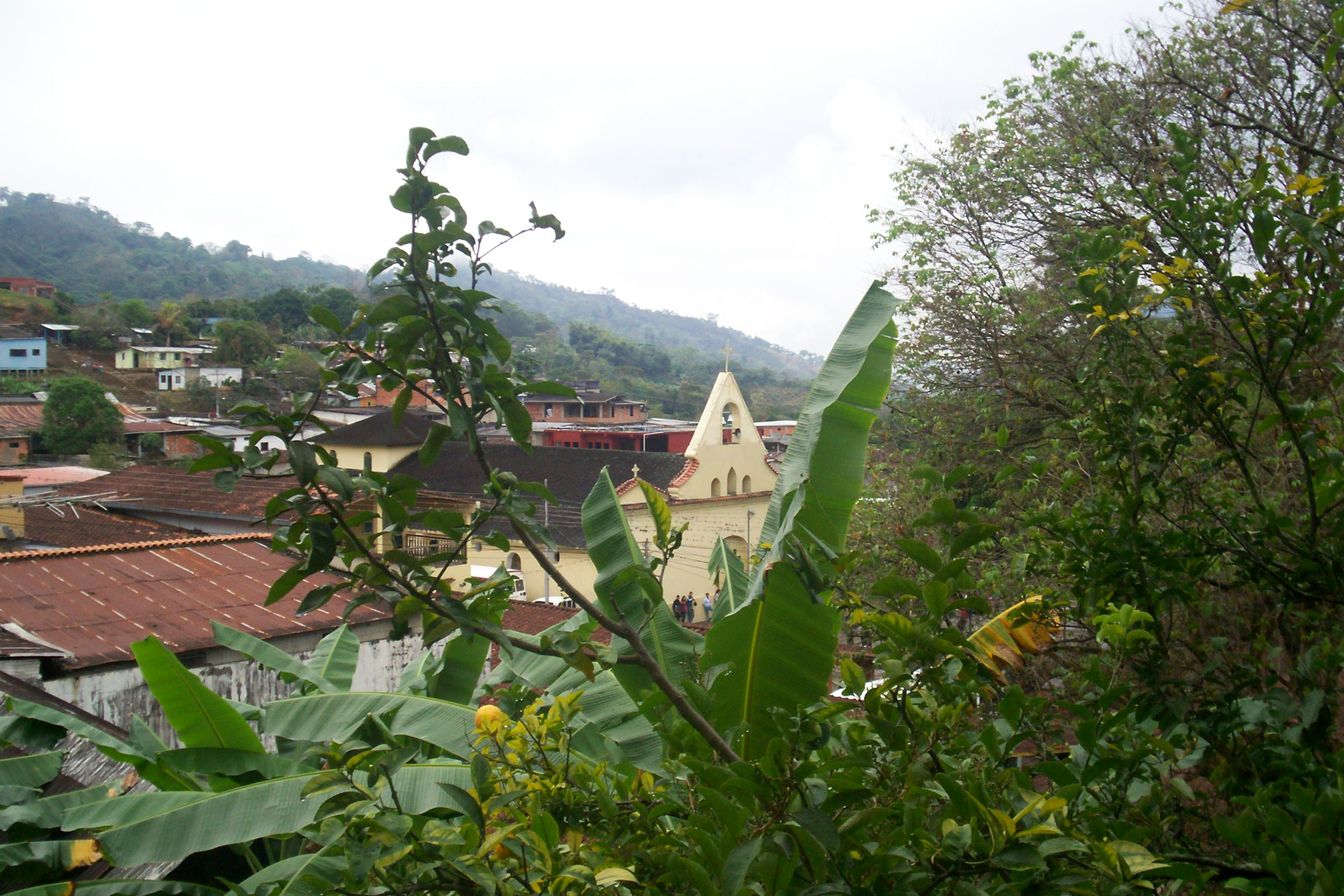
Calderas Church

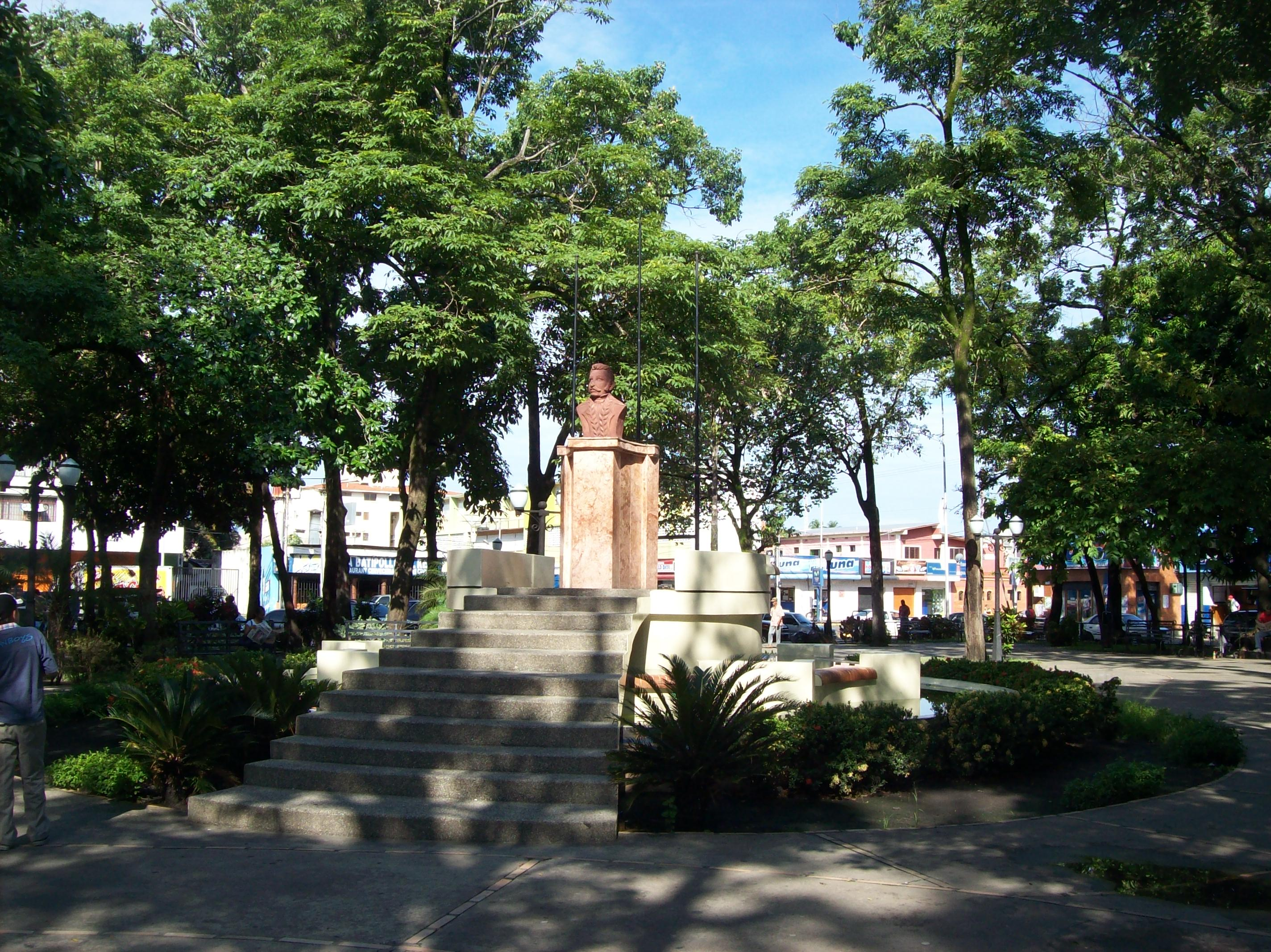
El Estudiante Square

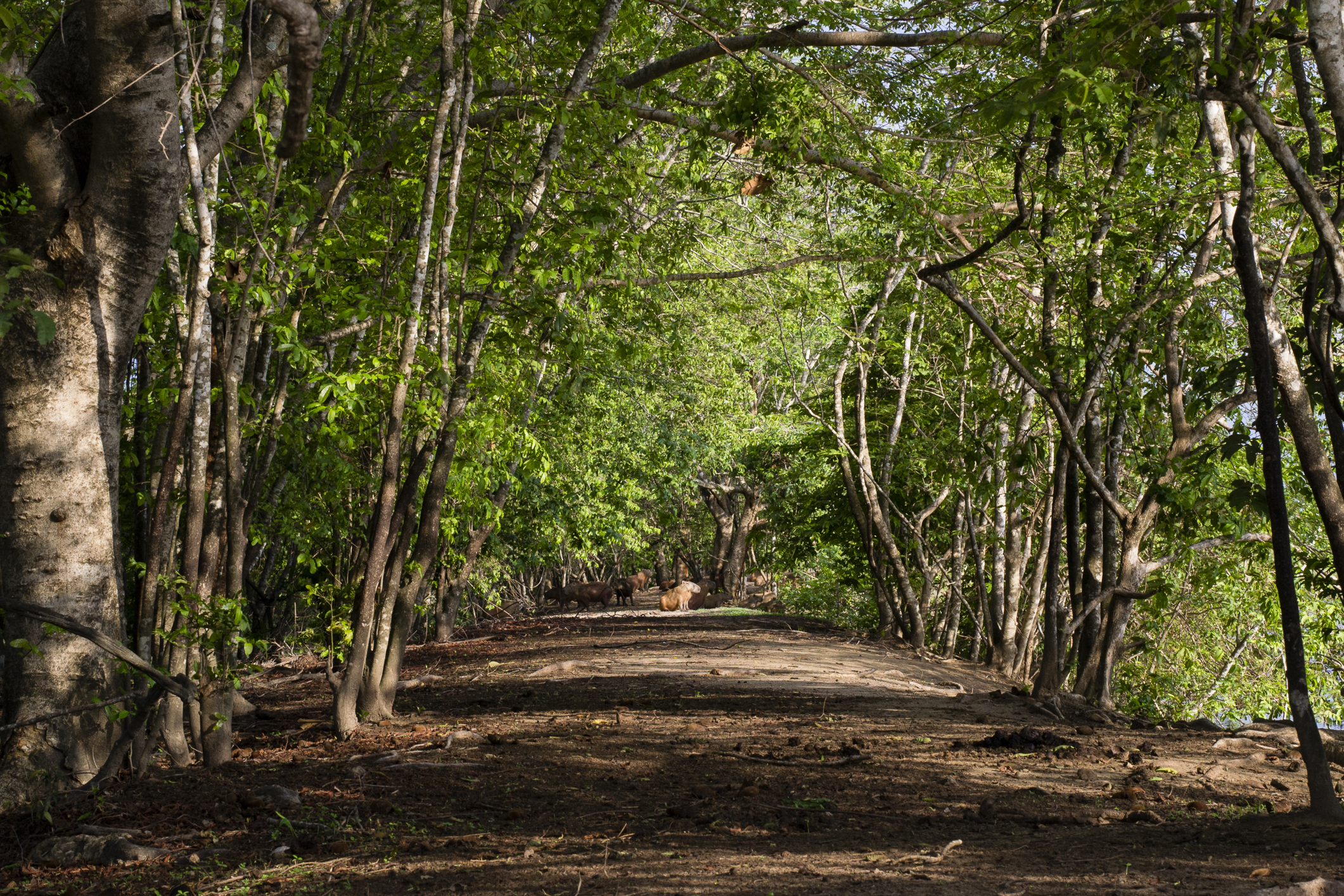
Sendero de Chigüires

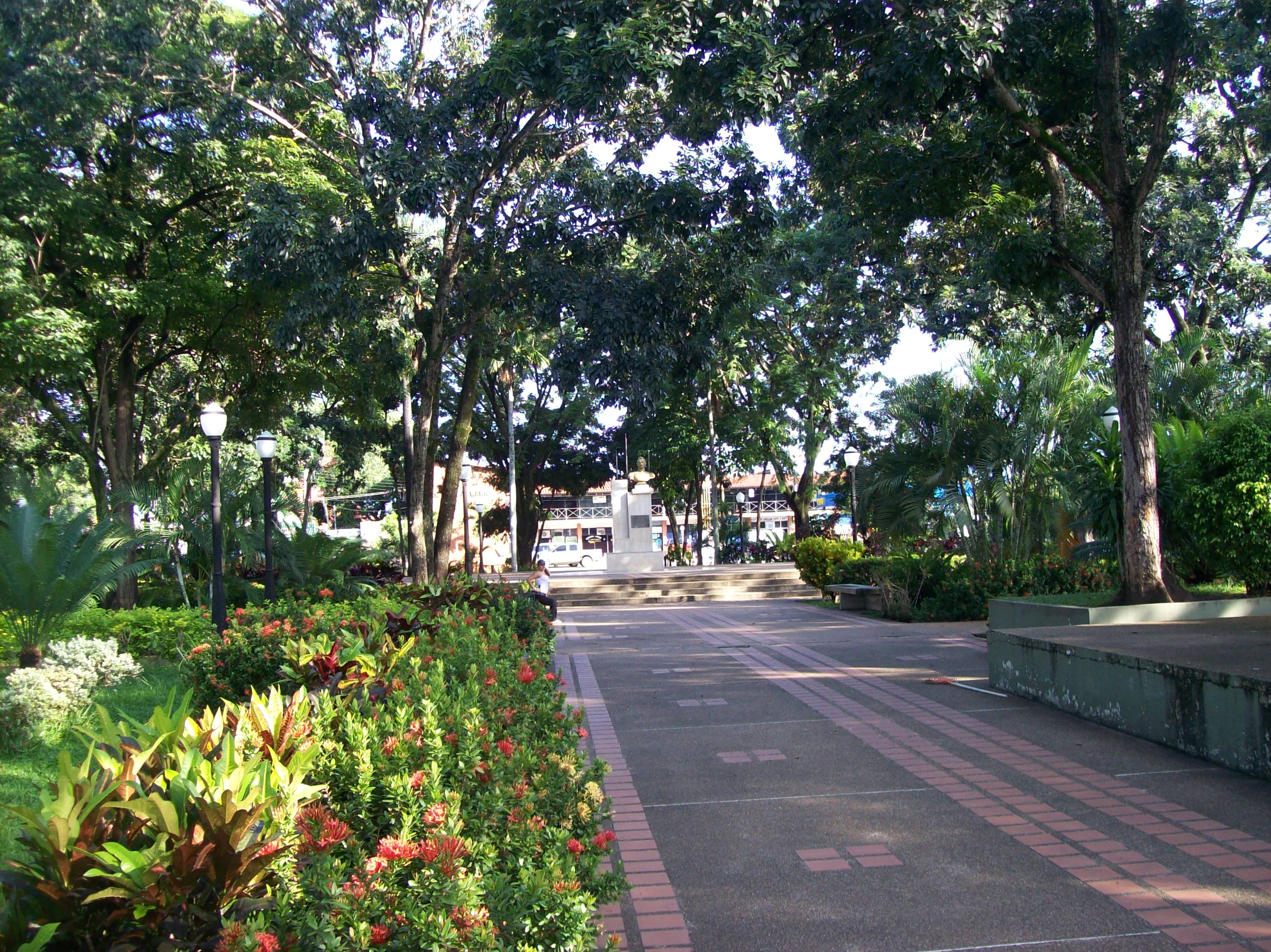
Ezequiel Zamora Square

== Notable residents ==
- Ronald Hernández, professional footballer
- Jorge Linares, Multiple-weight world boxing champion.
- Darwin Matheus, professional footballer

== See also ==
- List of cities and towns in Venezuela
