= Telephone numbers in Venezuela =

- Country: Venezuela
- Continent: South America
- Country code: +58
- International access: 00
- Long-distance: 0

The Venezuela numbering plan is a closed telephone numbering plan with three-digit area codes and seven-digit telephone numbers that directs telephone calls to particular regions on a public switched telephone network (PSTN) or to a mobile telephone network, where they are further routed by the local network. The last revision of the current numbering plan was on September 21, 2000.

Example landline calls (using Caracas as reference):

           5551212  (within metropolitan area)
      0212 5551212  (within Venezuela, Caracas excluded)
011 58 212 5551212  (from the U.S./Canada to Venezuela)

== Geographic area codes ==
State	Area Code
Amazonas	248
Anzoátegui	281, 282, 283, 235
Apure	247, 278
Aragua	243, 244, 245, 246
Barinas	273, 278
Bolívar	235, 285, 286, 288
Carabobo	241, 242, 243, 245, 249
Cojedes	258
Delta Amacuro	287
Distrito Capital	212
Falcón	259, 268, 269
Federal dependencies of Venezuela	237
Guárico	235, 238, 246, 247
Lara	251, 252, 253
Mérida	271, 273, 274, 275
Miranda	212, 234, 239
Monagas	287, 291, 292
Nueva Esparta	295
Portuguesa	255, 256, 257
Sucre	293, 294
Táchira	276, 277
Trujillo	271, 272
Vargas	212
Yaracuy	251, 253, 254
Zulia	261, 262, 263, 264, 265, 266, 267, 271, 275
Binational (Colombia)	260, 270

== Mobile telephone area codes ==
Operator	Area Code
Digitel	412, 422
Movistar	414, 424
Tesan	415
Movilnet	416, 426
Digicel (formerly Elca, now Digitel)	417
Infonet (now Digitel)	418

Area codes 417 and 418 were deleted in 2006 when Digicel and Infonet were bought by Digitel, migrating their subscribers to a single access code: 412.

== Other area codes ==
- Codes starting with 1XX specify a particular carrier to route a call to (XX denotes the carrier code).
- Codes starting with 5 are region-free and are treated as local calls wherever the calling party is dialing from (within Venezuela only).
- Codes starting with 8 are toll-free numbers.
- Codes starting with 9 are assigned to premium rate services.
