= 2024 Liga FUTVE =

Venezuelan Primera División season

Liga FUTVE
- Season: 2024
- Dates: 2 February – 8 December 2024
- Champions: Deportivo Táchira (11th title)
- Relegated: Inter de Barinas; Angostura
- Copa Libertadores: Deportivo Táchira; Carabobo; Universidad Central; Monagas
- Copa Sudamericana: Metropolitanos; Deportivo La Guaira; Academia Puerto Cabello; Caracas
- Matches: 234
- Goals: 562 (2.4 per match)
- Top goalscorer: Juan Camilo Zapata; Tomás Rodríguez (16 goals each)
- Biggest home win: Dep. Táchira 5–1 Est. Mérida (4 February); UCV 4–0 Inter de Barinas (11 May); Est. Mérida 4–0 Metropolitanos (2 September)
- Biggest away win: Inter de Barinas 0–4 Carabobo (23 July); Caracas 0–4 Dep. Táchira (12 November)
- Highest scoring: Angostura 3–4 Portuguesa (12 May); Metropolitanos 5–2 UCV (18 May)

The 2024 Primera División season, officially Liga de Fútbol Profesional Venezolano or Liga FUTVE, was the 68th season of the Venezuelan Primera División, the top-flight football league in Venezuela, and the 43rd season since the start of the professional era. The season began on 2 February 2024, being pushed back from its original date of 19 January 2024 to avoid a clash with the 2024 CONMEBOL Pre-Olympic Tournament held in Venezuela, and ended on 8 December 2024.

The defending champions Deportivo Táchira won a second league championship in a row and their eleventh overall after defeating Carabobo on kicks from the penalty mark in the season's grand final, following a 1–1 draw on aggregate.

== Competition format ==
The 2024 season saw a return to the Apertura and Clausura format in the competition, which was used for the last time in 2019. Both the Apertura and Clausura tournaments featured a first stage in which the participating teams played each other on a single round-robin fashion, with the top eight teams advancing to a semi-final stage in which they were divided into two groups of four teams each in which the qualified teams played against the other rivals in their group twice. The winners of each group contested a single-match final, with the Apertura and Clausura winners facing each other in the season's grand final (Final Absoluta) to decide the league champions. In the finals of both short tournaments, the finalist with the better performance was entitled to host the match.

The season champions as well as the best-placed team in the aggregate table qualified for the group stage of the 2025 Copa Libertadores, while the season runners-up and the second best-placed team in the aggregate table qualified for the preliminary stages of that competition, with the former entering the second stage and the latter entering the first stage. The runners-up of both of the season's short tournaments as well as the next two best teams in the aggregate table that did not qualify for the Copa Libertadores qualified for the 2025 Copa Sudamericana.

== Teams ==
15 teams were expected to compete in the 2024 season, subject to the fulfillment of club licensing requirements: the top 14 teams in the first stage of the 2023 season as well as the 2023 Segunda División champions Ureña. Ureña would replace Mineros de Guayana, relegated at the end of the previous season.

Prior to the start of the season, it was reported that Hermanos Colmenarez would change its name to Inter de Barinas, which was confirmed on 30 January 2024. It was also announced that Ureña had resigned from playing in the top tier due to economic problems and would sell their spot to third-placed side Marítimo de La Guaira. Although on 9 January 2024 the league announced the first matchday with Ureña receiving a bye, the club's final withdrawal from the competition was announced on 31 January 2024. As a result of this, the season was played by 14 clubs.

Locations of the 2024 Primera División teams
Locations of the 2024 Primera División teams – Barinas state
Locations of the 2024 Primera División teams – Caracas

Relegated to 2024 Segunda División: 15 / Mineros de Guayana	Promoted to 2024 Primera División None (Ureña withdrew)

=== Stadia and locations ===
Team	City	Stadium	Capacity
Academia Puerto Cabello	Puerto Cabello	La Bombonerita	7,500
Angostura	Ciudad Bolívar	Ricardo Tulio Maya	2,500
Carabobo	Valencia	Misael Delgado	10,400
Caracas	Caracas	Olímpico de la UCV	23,940
Caracas	Caracas	Brígido Iriarte	10,000
Deportivo La Guaira	Caracas	Olímpico de la UCV	23,940
Deportivo Táchira	San Cristóbal	Polideportivo de Pueblo Nuevo	38,755
Estudiantes de Mérida	Mérida	Metropolitano de Mérida	42,200
Inter de Barinas	Barinas	Agustín Tovar	29,800
Metropolitanos	Caracas	Olímpico de la UCV	23,940
Monagas	Maturín	Monumental de Maturín	51,796
Portuguesa	Acarigua	General José Antonio Páez	18,000
Rayo Zuliano	Maracaibo	José Pachencho Romero	40,800
Universidad Central	Caracas	Olímpico de la UCV	23,940
Zamora	Barinas	Agustín Tovar	29,800

=== Personnel and kits ===
Team	Manager	Kit manufacturer	Main shirt sponsors
Academia Puerto Cabello	(Spain) Iván Fernández	Givova	CLX Samsung
Angostura	(Uruguay) Saúl Maldonado	RS	Genpar
Carabobo	(Spain) Diego Merino	New Arrival	Fospuca, El Maizal, Juega En Línea
Caracas	(Venezuela) Fernando Aristeguieta	RS	Maltín Polar, SellaTuParley
Deportivo La Guaira	(Venezuela) Juan Domingo Tolisano	RS	Traki
Deportivo Táchira	(Venezuela) Edgar Pérez Greco	Boman	Juega En Línea, Rutaca Airlines, Grupo JHS
Estudiantes de Mérida	(Venezuela) Daniel Farías	Econtex	Cordialito.la, Frigilux, Daka, Ivon
Inter de Barinas	(Venezuela) Enrique García	Attle	Corporation CSA
Metropolitanos	(Venezuela) José María Morr	RS	Aerolíneas Estelar
Monagas	(Venezuela) Carlojavier Fuhrman (caretaker)	RS	Banplus
Portuguesa	(Venezuela) Giancarlo Maldonado	Attle	Bet77, Alimentos Fina Ideal
Rayo Zuliano	(Venezuela) Javier Villafráz	Attle	San Simón, Javitour
Universidad Central	(Venezuela) Daniel Sasso	New Arrival	CFMoto Venezuela, SoyTechno
Zamora	(Venezuela) Alí Cañas	RS	Thundernet

==== Managerial changes ====
Team	Outgoing manager	Manner of departure	Date of vacancy	Position in table	Incoming manager	Date of appointment
Torneo Apertura
Carabobo	(Venezuela) Juan Domingo Tolisano	End of contract	13 October 2023	Pre-season	(Spain) Diego Merino	22 November 2023
Monagas	(Venezuela) Tony Franco	End of contract	19 October 2023	Pre-season	(Venezuela) Daniel Blanco	20 October 2023
Estudiantes de Mérida	(Venezuela) Franklin Lucena	Sacked	13 February 2024	14th	(Venezuela) Daniel Farías	15 February 2024
Deportivo La Guaira	(Venezuela) Enrique García	Mutual agreement	21 March 2024	10th	(Venezuela) Juan Domingo Tolisano	23 March 2024
Monagas	(Venezuela) Daniel Blanco	Sacked	26 March 2024	9th	(Venezuela) Grenddy Perozo (Note: Originally as a caretaker manager, appointed on a permanent basis at the end of the Torneo Apertura.)	26 March 2024
Caracas	(Venezuela) Leonardo González	Mutual agreement	31 March 2024	11th	(Venezuela) Henry Meléndez	31 March 2024
Zamora	(Venezuela) Enrique Maggiolo	Mutual agreement	1 April 2024	13th	(Venezuela) Alí Cañas	1 April 2024
Torneo Clausura
Caracas	(Venezuela) Henry Meléndez	Demoted to the youth setup	6 July 2024	Pre-tournament	(Venezuela) Fernando Aristeguieta	6 July 2024
Portuguesa	(Venezuela) Jesús Ortiz	Mutual agreement	11 July 2024	Pre-tournament	(Venezuela) Roberts Rivas (Note: Caretaker manager.)	11 July 2024
Portuguesa	(Venezuela) Roberts Rivas	End of caretaker spell	18 July 2024	11th	(Venezuela) Giancarlo Maldonado	18 July 2024
Academia Puerto Cabello	(Venezuela) Noel Sanvicente	Mutual agreement	22 July 2024	10th	(Venezuela) Bladimir Morales	22 July 2024
Academia Puerto Cabello	(Venezuela) Bladimir Morales	End of caretaker spell	23 July 2024	9th	(Spain) Iván Fernández	23 July 2024
Inter de Barinas	(Venezuela) Leonel Vielma	Sacked	23 August 2024	14th	(Venezuela) Alfarabi Romero	26 August 2024
Rayo Zuliano	(Venezuela) Elvis Martínez	Sacked	23 August 2024	4th	(Venezuela) Javier Villafráz	26 August 2024
Inter de Barinas	(Venezuela) Alfarabi Romero	End of caretaker spell	3 September 2024	14th	(Venezuela) Enrique García	3 September 2024
Angostura	(Venezuela) Osmar Castillo	Mutual agreement	6 September 2024	13th	(Venezuela) Adrián Sánchez	6 September 2024 (Note: Ariel Guevara was appointed manager on 6 September, but registration issues prevented him from managing the club, and Angostura ultimately announced he would not manage the club on 26 September.)
Monagas	(Venezuela) Grenddy Perozo	Resigned	22 September 2024	7th	(Venezuela) Carlojavier Fuhrman	26 September 2024
Angostura	(Venezuela) Adrián Sánchez	End of caretaker spell	26 September 2024	13th	(Uruguay) Saúl Maldonado	26 September 2024
Deportivo Táchira	(Venezuela) Eduardo Saragó	Resigned	30 October 2024	1st, Group A	(Venezuela) Edgar Pérez Greco	31 October 2024

== Torneo Apertura ==
The Torneo Apertura was the first tournament of the 2024 season. It began on 2 February and ended on 2 June 2024.

=== First stage ===
==== Standings ====
Pos	Team	Pld	W	D	L	GF	GA	GD	Pts	Qualification
1	Universidad Central	13	6	7	0	17	8	+9	25	Advance to the semi-finals
2	Angostura	13	7	3	3	16	13	+3	24	Advance to the semi-finals
3	Inter de Barinas	13	7	1	5	14	12	+2	22	Advance to the semi-finals
4	Portuguesa	13	6	3	4	17	12	+5	21	Advance to the semi-finals
5	Carabobo	13	5	6	2	13	9	+4	21	Advance to the semi-finals
6	Metropolitanos	13	6	3	4	19	18	+1	21	Advance to the semi-finals
7	Academia Puerto Cabello	13	5	5	3	15	11	+4	20	Advance to the semi-finals
8	Deportivo La Guaira	13	5	5	3	14	14	0	20	Advance to the semi-finals
9	Deportivo Táchira	13	5	4	4	13	10	+3	19	
10	Monagas	13	5	4	4	19	18	+1	19	
11	Caracas	13	2	6	5	10	13	−3	12	
12	Estudiantes de Mérida	13	2	2	9	14	24	−10	8	
13	Rayo Zuliano	13	1	4	8	16	23	−7	7	
14	Zamora	13	0	5	8	10	22	−12	5	

Source: Liga FUTVE, Soccerway
Rules for classification: 1) Points; 2) Goal difference; 3) Goals scored; 4) Head-to-head results; 5) Drawing of lots.

==== Results ====
Home \ Away	APC	ANG	CBO	CAR	DLG	TAC	ESM	INT	MET	MON	POR	RAY	UCV	ZAM
Academia Puerto Cabello	—	—	2–2	2–0	—	—	2–1	—	2–3	2–2	—	3–1	—	—
Angostura	1–0	—	—	—	1–1	2–0	—	2–1	—	—	0–0	—	0–0	—
Carabobo	—	2–1	—	1–0	—	—	1–0	1–0	—	—	—	2–2	0–1	3–1
Caracas	—	0–1	—	—	2–0	0–0	—	1–2	—	—	0–1	—	2–2	—
Deportivo La Guaira	0–0	—	0–0	—	—	1–0	—	—	1–2	2–1	0–2	—	—	2–1
Deportivo Táchira	0–1	—	1–0	—	—	—	5–1	—	2–0	1–0	—	2–1	—	—
Estudiantes de Mérida	—	0–1	—	1–1	1–2	—	—	0–2	—	—	—	2–1	0–1	3–1
Inter de Barinas	1–0	—	—	—	1–2	1–1	—	—	—	1–0	1–3	—	0–1	1–0
Metropolitanos	—	2–0	1–1	0–0	—	—	1–1	1–2	—	—	—	1–0	—	3–1
Monagas	—	4–2	0–0	1–1	—	—	3–2	—	2–4	—	—	2–1	—	1–0
Portuguesa	0–1	—	0–0	—	—	1–1	3–2	—	3–1	1–2	—	—	—	—
Rayo Zuliano	—	2–3	—	0–1	2–2	—	—	0–1	—	—	3–1	—	2–2	—
Universidad Central	0–0	—	—	—	1–1	2–0	—	—	3–0	1–1	1–0	—	—	2–2
Zamora	0–0	1–2	—	2–2	—	0–0	—	—	—	—	0–2	1–1	—	—

Source: Liga FUTVE, Soccerway
Legend: Blue = home team win; Yellow = draw; Red = away team win.

=== Semi-finals ===
The eight teams that advanced to the semi-finals were drawn into two groups of four teams. The two group winners advanced to the final.

==== Group A ====
Pos	Team	Pld	W	D	L	GF	GA	GD	Pts	Qualification	MET	DLG	UCV	INT
1	Metropolitanos	6	4	2	0	13	6	+7	14	Advance to the Final	—	2–1	5–2	2–0
2	Deportivo La Guaira	6	3	0	3	8	8	0	9		1–2	—	0–2	2–1
3	Universidad Central	6	2	2	2	9	8	+1	8		0–0	0–2	—	4–0
4	Inter de Barinas	6	0	2	4	5	13	−8	2		2–2	1–2	1–1	—

Source: Soccerway
Legend: Blue = home team win; Yellow = draw; Red = away team win.
Rules for classification: 1) Points; 2) Goal difference; 3) Goals scored; 4) Head-to-head results; 5) Drawing of lots.

==== Group B ====
Pos	Team	Pld	W	D	L	GF	GA	GD	Pts	Qualification	CBO	POR	APC	ANG
1	Carabobo	6	3	2	1	10	5	+5	11	Advance to the Final	—	2–1	1–1	3–0
2	Portuguesa	6	2	2	2	10	10	0	8		2–1	—	1–1	2–2
3	Academia Puerto Cabello	6	1	3	2	5	7	−2	6		0–2	1–0	—	1–1
4	Angostura	6	1	3	2	9	12	−3	6		1–1	3–4	2–1	—

Source: Soccerway
Legend: Blue = home team win; Yellow = draw; Red = away team win.
Rules for classification: 1) Points; 2) Goal difference; 3) Goals scored; 4) Head-to-head results; 5) Drawing of lots.

=== Final ===
2 June 2024
17:00 UTC−4

Carabobo	3–0	Metropolitanos
Aponte 75'; Ortiz 82'; López 90+7'	Report

Estadio Misael Delgado, Valencia
Referee: Yender Herrera

== Torneo Clausura ==
The Torneo Clausura was the second and last tournament of the 2024 season. It began on 16 July and ended on 24 November 2024.

=== First stage ===
==== Standings ====
Pos	Team	Pld	W	D	L	GF	GA	GD	Pts	Qualification
1	Deportivo Táchira	13	7	6	0	17	5	+12	27	Advance to the semi-finals
2	Monagas	13	7	4	2	22	14	+8	25	Advance to the semi-finals
3	Rayo Zuliano	13	7	2	4	18	15	+3	23	Advance to the semi-finals
4	Estudiantes de Mérida	13	6	4	3	20	14	+6	22	Advance to the semi-finals
5	Carabobo	13	5	5	3	17	13	+4	20	Advance to the semi-finals
6	Caracas	13	5	5	3	15	12	+3	20	Advance to the semi-finals
7	Deportivo La Guaira	13	5	5	3	13	11	+2	20	Advance to the semi-finals
8	Zamora	13	6	2	5	15	14	+1	20	Advance to the semi-finals
9	Universidad Central	13	5	4	4	18	17	+1	19	
10	Metropolitanos	13	4	6	3	16	16	0	18	
11	Academia Puerto Cabello	13	2	6	5	13	15	−2	12	
12	Portuguesa	13	3	2	8	12	21	−9	11	
13	Angostura	13	1	3	9	9	20	−11	6	
14	Inter de Barinas	13	0	2	11	8	26	−18	2	

Source: Liga FUTVE, Soccerway
Rules for classification: 1) Points; 2) Goal difference; 3) Goals scored; 4) Head-to-head results; 5) Drawing of lots.

==== Results ====
Home \ Away	APC	ANG	CBO	CAR	DLG	TAC	ESM	INT	MET	MON	POR	RAY	UCV	ZAM
Academia Puerto Cabello	—	1–1	—	—	0–1	0–0	—	2–0	—	—	0–0	—	3–3	1–0
Angostura	—	—	1–2	0–0	—	—	1–1	—	0–2	0–2	—	0–1	—	1–2
Carabobo	2–1	—	—	—	3–1	1–1	—	—	2–2	0–0	1–0	—	—	—
Caracas	0–0	—	0–0	—	—	—	2–3	—	2–1	1–2	—	1–2	—	2–1
Deportivo La Guaira	—	3–2	—	0–0	—	—	1–1	1–0	—	—	—	3–2	2–0	—
Deportivo Táchira	—	2–0	—	1–1	1–0	—	—	4–1	—	—	2–0	—	2–0	1–0
Estudiantes de Mérida	2–1	—	0–0	—	—	1–1	—	—	4–0	2–1	2–0	—	—	—
Inter de Barinas	—	1–2	0–4	1–2	—	—	1–2	—	1–3	—	—	0–1	—	—
Metropolitanos	1–1	—	—	—	0–0	1–1	—	—	—	1–2	2–1	—	0–0	—
Monagas	2–1	—	—	—	0–0	0–0	—	2–2	—	—	4–1	—	1–3	—
Portuguesa	—	2–1	—	0–1	2–1	—	—	2–1	—	—	—	1–2	1–1	2–3
Rayo Zuliano	3–2	—	2–1	—	—	0–1	2–1	—	2–2	1–2	—	—	—	0–0
Universidad Central	—	1–0	3–1	1–3	—	—	3–1	0–0	—	—	—	1–0	—	—
Zamora	—	—	2–0	—	0–0	—	1–0	1–0	0–1	2–4	—	—	3–2	—

Source: Liga FUTVE, Soccerway
Legend: Blue = home team win; Yellow = draw; Red = away team win.

=== Semi-finals ===
The eight teams that advanced to the semi-finals were drawn into two groups of four teams. The two group winners advanced to the final.

==== Group A ====
Pos	Team	Pld	W	D	L	GF	GA	GD	Pts	Qualification	TAC	RAY	CAR	ZAM
1	Deportivo Táchira	6	5	1	0	14	3	+11	16	Advance to the Final	—	3–1	2–0	1–1
2	Rayo Zuliano	6	2	1	3	9	11	−2	7		1–2	—	0–3	3–0
3	Caracas	6	2	0	4	7	10	−3	6		0–4	0–1	—	3–1
4	Zamora	6	1	2	3	7	13	−6	5		0–2	3–3	2–1	—

Source: Soccerway
Legend: Blue = home team win; Yellow = draw; Red = away team win.
Rules for classification: 1) Points; 2) Goal difference; 3) Goals scored; 4) Head-to-head results; 5) Drawing of lots.

==== Group B ====
Pos	Team	Pld	W	D	L	GF	GA	GD	Pts	Qualification	CBO	DLG	ESM	MON
1	Carabobo	6	4	2	0	9	2	+7	14	Advance to the Final	—	1–1	2–0	1–0
2	Deportivo La Guaira	6	4	1	1	10	4	+6	13		0–1	—	3–1	3–1
3	Estudiantes de Mérida	6	2	0	4	6	11	−5	6		0–3	0–1	—	2–0
4	Monagas	6	0	1	5	4	12	−8	1		1–1	0–2	2–3	—

Source: Soccerway
Legend: Blue = home team win; Yellow = draw; Red = away team win.
Rules for classification: 1) Points; 2) Goal difference; 3) Goals scored; 4) Head-to-head results; 5) Drawing of lots.

=== Final ===
24 November 2024
19:00 UTC−4

Deportivo Táchira	4–1	Carabobo
Castillo 45'; Cova 66'; Uribe 90+4'; Fioravanti 90+8'	Report	González 29'

Estadio Polideportivo de Pueblo Nuevo, San Cristóbal
Referee: Jesús Valenzuela

== Final Absoluta ==
The winners of the Apertura (Carabobo) and Clausura (Deportivo Táchira) tournaments played a two-legged series to decide the season champions (Campeón Absoluto). The second leg was hosted by the Apertura winners, Carabobo.

1 December 2024
19:00 UTC−4

Deportivo Táchira	1–1	Carabobo
Mendoza 58'	Report	González 41'

Estadio Polideportivo de Pueblo Nuevo, San Cristóbal
Referee: José Uzcátegui

8 December 2024
17:00 UTC−4

Carabobo	0–0	Deportivo Táchira
	Report
Penalties
Blanco (penalty missed); González (penalty scored); Gallardo (penalty scored); Guaramato (penalty missed)	2–4	(penalty scored) Cova; (penalty missed) Sosa; (penalty scored) Pardo; (penalty scored) Vivas; (penalty scored) Camacho

Estadio Misael Delgado, Valencia
Referee: Yender Herrera

Tied 1–1 on aggregate. Deportivo Táchira won on penalties.

Liga FUTVE
2024 champions

11th title

== Aggregate table ==
Pos	Team	Pld	W	D	L	GF	GA	GD	Pts	Qualification or relegation
1	Deportivo Táchira (C)	26	12	10	4	30	15	+15	46	Qualification for Copa Libertadores group stage
2	Universidad Central	26	11	11	4	35	25	+10	44	Qualification for Copa Libertadores second stage
3	Monagas	26	12	8	6	41	32	+9	44	Qualification for Copa Libertadores first stage
4	Carabobo	26	10	11	5	30	22	+8	41	Qualification for Copa Libertadores group stage
5	Deportivo La Guaira	26	10	10	6	27	25	+2	40	Qualification for Copa Sudamericana first stage (Note: Metropolitanos qualified for the Copa Sudamericana first stage as 2024 Apertura runners-up.)
6	Metropolitanos	26	10	9	7	35	34	+1	39	Qualification for Copa Sudamericana first stage
7	Academia Puerto Cabello	26	7	11	8	28	26	+2	32	Qualification for Copa Sudamericana first stage
8	Caracas	26	7	11	8	25	25	0	32	Qualification for Copa Sudamericana first stage
9	Portuguesa	26	9	5	12	29	33	−4	32	
10	Estudiantes de Mérida	26	8	6	12	34	38	−4	30	
11	Rayo Zuliano	26	8	6	12	34	38	−4	30	
12	Angostura (R)	26	8	6	12	25	33	−8	30	Relegation to Segunda División (Note: Angostura were relegated to Segunda División for failing to comply with club licensing requirements.)
13	Zamora	26	6	7	13	25	36	−11	25	
14	Inter de Barinas (R)	26	7	3	16	22	38	−16	24	Relegation to Segunda División

Source: Liga FUTVE
Rules for classification: 1) Points; 2) Goal difference; 3) Goals scored; 4) Head-to-head results; 5) Drawing of lots.
(C) Champions; (R) Relegated

== Top goalscorers ==
Rank	Player	Club	Goals
1	(Colombia) Juan Camilo Zapata	Inter de Barinas / Universidad Central	16
1	(Panama) Tomás Rodríguez	Monagas	16
3	(Venezuela) Edwuin Pernía	Caracas	14
4	(Venezuela) Edson Tortolero	Carabobo	13
4	(Argentina) Elías Alderete	Estudiantes de Mérida	13
6	(Venezuela) Andrés Montero	Portuguesa / Rayo Zuliano	12
7	(Venezuela) Charlis Ortiz	Metropolitanos / Universidad Central	11
7	(Venezuela) Johan Moreno	Portuguesa	11
9	(Venezuela) José Balza	Carabobo	10
9	(Venezuela) Maurice Cova	Deportivo Táchira	10

Source: Balonazos

== Season awards ==
On 11 December 2024, the Liga FUTVE held a ceremony in Caracas to announce the winners of the season awards.

Award	Winner	Club
Most Valuable Player	(Venezuela) Carlos Vivas	Deportivo Táchira
Best Goalkeeper	(Venezuela) Jesús Camargo	Deportivo Táchira
Best Youth Player	(Venezuela) Keiber Lamadrid	Deportivo La Guaira
Assists Leader	(Venezuela) Juan Carlos Castellanos	Angostura / Deportivo La Guaira
Manager of the Year	(Spain) Diego Merino	Carabobo
Best Goal	(Venezuela) Jesús Lobo	Estudiantes de Mérida
Fair Play Award	Rayo Zuliano	
Top Goalscorer	(Colombia) Juan Camilo Zapata (Panama) Tomás Rodríguez	Inter de Barinas / Universidad Central; Monagas

=== Team of the Season ===
Team of the Season
Goalkeeper	Defenders	Midfielders	Forwards
(Venezuela) Jesús Camargo (Deportivo Táchira)	(Venezuela) Roberto Rosales (Deportivo Táchira) (Venezuela) Carlos Vivas (Deportivo Táchira) (Venezuela) Leonardo Aponte (Carabobo) (Venezuela) Miguel Pernía (Carabobo)	(Venezuela) Maurice Cova (Deportivo Táchira) (Venezuela) Gustavo González (Carabobo) (Venezuela) Keiber Lamadrid (Deportivo La Guaira) (Venezuela) Edson Tortolero (Carabobo)	(Colombia) Juan Camilo Zapata (Inter de Barinas / Universidad Central) (Panama) Tomás Rodríguez (Monagas)

== See also ==
- 2024 Copa Venezuela
