= 2023 Liga FUTVE =

Venezuelan Primera División season

Liga FUTVE
- Season: 2023
- Dates: 3 February – 25 November 2023
- Champions: Deportivo Táchira (10th title)
- Relegated: Mineros de Guayana
- Copa Libertadores: Deportivo Táchira; Caracas; Portuguesa; Academia Puerto Cabello
- Copa Sudamericana: Carabobo; Deportivo La Guaira; Metropolitanos; Rayo Zuliano
- Matches: 223
- Goals: 545 (2.44 per match)
- Top goalscorer: Luifer Hernández (18 goals)
- Biggest home win: Dep. Táchira 5–0 Rayo Zuliano (4 March); Est. Mérida 5–0 Angostura (6 July); UCV 5–0 Zamora (14 July); Carabobo 6–1 Mineros (22 July)
- Biggest away win: Zamora 1–5 Est. Mérida (19 February); Mineros 0–4 Dep. Táchira (6 May)
- Highest scoring: Rayo Zuliano 4–4 Mineros (26 February); La Guaira 5–3 Rayo Zuliano (6 May)

The 2023 Primera División season, officially Liga de Fútbol Profesional Venezolano or Liga FUTVE, was the 67th season of the Venezuelan Primera División, the top-flight football league in Venezuela, and the 42nd season since the start of the professional era. The season began on 3 February and ended on 25 November 2023.

Deportivo Táchira won their tenth title at the end of the season, defeating Caracas on penalty kicks following a 1–1 draw after extra time in the final. Metropolitanos were the defending champions.

== Format ==
The competition format for this season was announced by the Liga FUTVE on 31 January 2023. Similar to the previous season, the 15 participating clubs took part in a double round-robin first stage in which they played each other twice (once at home and once away) for a total of 28 games. The top four clubs, which qualified for the 2024 Copa Libertadores, also advanced to a final stage where they played each other twice with the top two teams playing a single-match final to decide the league champions. However, and unlike the previous season, no final stage to decide the teams qualified for the 2024 Copa Sudamericana was played, with the four berths to that competition instead being awarded to the teams placing 5th to 8th in the first stage. The team placing last in the first stage was relegated to Segunda División for the following season.

== Teams ==
16 teams were expected to compete in the 2023 season, subject to the fulfillment of club licensing requirements: the top 15 teams in the first stage of the 2022 season as well as the 2022 Segunda División champions Angostura, who defeated Academia Anzoátegui in the Segunda División final on 16 October 2022. They replaced Aragua, who were relegated to Segunda División at the end of the previous season after finishing in bottom place.

On 12 December 2022, it was announced that Zulia and Segunda División side Rayo Zuliano would merge, with the latter taking the former's place in the league. The merger was officially confirmed on 28 January 2023, with which Rayo Zuliano competed in the top flight for the first time ever in this season. Furthermore, two days later it was confirmed that Deportivo Lara would not take part in the season, ultimately bringing the number of participating teams down to 15.

Locations of the 2023 Primera División teams
Locations of the 2023 Primera División teams – Barinas state
Locations of the 2023 Primera División teams – Caracas

Relegated to 2023 Segunda División: 16 / Aragua	Failed club licensing process Deportivo Lara	Promoted to 2023 Primera División: 1 / Angostura

=== Stadia and locations ===
Team	City	Stadium	Capacity
Academia Puerto Cabello	Puerto Cabello	La Bombonerita	7,500
Angostura	Ciudad Bolívar	Ricardo Tulio Maya	2,500
Carabobo	Valencia	Misael Delgado	10,400
Caracas	Caracas	Olímpico de la UCV	23,940
Deportivo La Guaira	Caracas	Olímpico de la UCV	23,940
Deportivo Táchira	San Cristóbal	Polideportivo de Pueblo Nuevo	38,755
Estudiantes de Mérida	Mérida	Metropolitano de Mérida	42,200
Hermanos Colmenarez	Barinas	Agustín Tovar	29,800
Metropolitanos	Caracas	Olímpico de la UCV	23,940
Mineros de Guayana	Ciudad Guayana	Polideportivo Cachamay	41,600
Monagas	Maturín	Monumental de Maturín	51,796
Portuguesa	Acarigua	General José Antonio Páez	18,000
Rayo Zuliano	Maracaibo	José Pachencho Romero	40,800
Universidad Central	Caracas	Olímpico de la UCV	23,940
Zamora	Barinas	Agustín Tovar	29,800

=== Personnel and kits ===
Team	Manager	Kit manufacturer	Shirt sponsor(s)
Academia Puerto Cabello	(Venezuela) Noel Sanvicente	Givova	CLX Samsung
Angostura	(Venezuela) Osmar Castillo	RS	Genpar
Carabobo	(Venezuela) Juan Tolisano	New Arrival	Fospuca, El Maizal, Juega En Línea
Caracas	(Venezuela) Leonardo González	RS	Maltín Polar, SellaTuParley, Pepsi, Canguro Venezuela
Deportivo La Guaira	(Venezuela) Enrique García	Fila	Traki, Furia Energy, Pepsi
Deportivo Táchira	(Venezuela) Eduardo Saragó	Attle	Juega En Línea, Grupo JHS, VenApp
Estudiantes de Mérida	(Venezuela) Franklin Lucena	New Arrival	Petro, Oriente, Visite Mérida, VenApp, Vnet
Hermanos Colmenarez	(Venezuela) Leonel Vielma	Attle	Corporation CSA
Metropolitanos	(Venezuela) José María Morr	RS	Aerolíneas Estelar
Mineros de Guayana	(Venezuela) Jesús Alonso Cabello	RS	
Monagas	(Venezuela) Tony Franco	RS	Banplus
Portuguesa	(Venezuela) Jesús Ortiz	RS	Alimentos Fina Ideal
Rayo Zuliano	(Venezuela) Elvis Martínez	Attle	PDVSA, Javitour
Universidad Central	(Venezuela) Daniel Sasso	RS	Avanti, Bancamiga
Zamora	(Venezuela) Enrique Maggiolo	RS	Thundernet

==== Managerial changes ====
Team	Outgoing manager	Manner of departure	Date of vacancy	Position in table	Incoming manager	Date of appointment
First stage
Rayo Zuliano	(Colombia) Alex García King	Change of role	2 October 2022	Pre-season	(Venezuela) Elvis Martínez	29 September 2022
Caracas	(Venezuela) Henry Meléndez	End of caretaker spell	21 October 2022	Pre-season	(Venezuela) Leonardo González	1 November 2022
Carabobo	(Venezuela) Enrique Maggiolo	End of contract	22 October 2022	Pre-season	(Venezuela) Juan Tolisano	17 November 2022
Estudiantes de Mérida	(Venezuela) Leonardo González	Resigned	29 October 2022	Pre-season	(Venezuela) Alí Cañas	27 January 2023
Zamora	(Venezuela) Noel Sanvicente	Resigned	31 October 2022	Pre-season	(Venezuela) Francesco Stifano	5 January 2023
Academia Puerto Cabello	(Venezuela) Juan Tolisano	Mutual agreement	1 November 2022	Pre-season	(Venezuela) Noel Sanvicente	2 November 2022
Deportivo La Guaira	(Venezuela) Daniel Farías	End of contract	9 November 2022	Pre-season	(Venezuela) Enrique García	20 November 2022
Mineros de Guayana	(Venezuela) Elías Emmons	End of caretaker spell	27 January 2023	Pre-season	(Venezuela) Tony Franco	27 January 2023
Portuguesa	(Argentina) Martín Brignani	Sacked	1 March 2023	15th	(Venezuela) Jesús Ortiz	1 March 2023
Hermanos Colmenarez	(Argentina) Horacio Matuszyczk	Sacked	25 March 2023	6th	(Venezuela) Leonel Vielma	29 March 2023
Mineros de Guayana	(Venezuela) Tony Franco	Mutual agreement	13 April 2023	14th	(Venezuela) Jesús Alonso Cabello (Note: Caretaker manager.)	14 April 2023
Universidad Central	(Venezuela) Edson Rodríguez	Sacked	21 April 2023	15th	(Venezuela) Luis De Oliveira	21 April 2023
Universidad Central	(Venezuela) Luis De Oliveira	End of caretaker spell	4 May 2023	15th	(Venezuela) Daniel Sasso	4 May 2023
Mineros de Guayana	(Venezuela) Jesús Alonso Cabello	End of caretaker spell	6 May 2023	15th	(Colombia) Jorge Luis Bernal	6 May 2023
Mineros de Guayana	(Colombia) Jorge Luis Bernal	Resigned	22 May 2023	15th	(Venezuela) Jesús Alonso Cabello	22 May 2023
Estudiantes de Mérida	(Venezuela) Alí Cañas	Resigned	30 May 2023	10th	(Venezuela) Franklin Lucena	31 May 2023
Mineros de Guayana	(Venezuela) Jesús Alonso Cabello	End of caretaker spell	24 June 2023	15th	(Argentina) Matías Mazmud	24 June 2023
Monagas	(Venezuela) Jhonny Ferreira	Promoted to sporting director	10 July 2023	10th	(Venezuela) Tony Franco	10 July 2023
Zamora	(Venezuela) Francesco Stifano	Resigned	16 July 2023	12th	(Venezuela) Alí Alvarado	21 July 2023
Mineros de Guayana	(Argentina) Matías Mazmud	Sacked	26 July 2023	15th	(Venezuela) Jesús Alonso Cabello	26 July 2023
Zamora	(Venezuela) Alí Alvarado	End of caretaker spell	1 August 2023	12th	(Venezuela) Enrique Maggiolo	1 August 2023

== First stage ==
The first stage started on 3 February and ended on 8 October 2023.

=== Standings ===
Pos	Team	Pld	W	D	L	GF	GA	GD	Pts	Qualification
1	Deportivo Táchira	28	19	7	2	47	17	+30	64	Advance to Final stage and qualification for Copa Libertadores
2	Academia Puerto Cabello	28	19	3	6	49	19	+30	60	Advance to Final stage and qualification for Copa Libertadores
3	Portuguesa	28	13	7	8	32	26	+6	46	Advance to Final stage and qualification for Copa Libertadores
4	Caracas	28	10	15	3	44	27	+17	45	Advance to Final stage and qualification for Copa Libertadores
5	Carabobo	28	11	12	5	35	21	+14	45	Qualification for Copa Sudamericana first stage
6	Deportivo La Guaira	28	9	12	7	37	33	+4	39	Qualification for Copa Sudamericana first stage
7	Metropolitanos	28	11	6	11	37	37	0	39	Qualification for Copa Sudamericana first stage
8	Rayo Zuliano	28	8	12	8	33	39	−6	36	Qualification for Copa Sudamericana first stage
9	Estudiantes de Mérida	28	9	6	13	39	41	−2	33	
10	Angostura	28	8	6	14	32	41	−9	30	
11	Monagas	28	8	6	14	29	41	−12	30	
12	Zamora	28	8	6	14	31	50	−19	30	
13	Universidad Central	28	6	9	13	27	36	−9	27	
14	Hermanos Colmenarez	28	5	9	14	25	37	−12	24	
15	Mineros de Guayana (R)	28	4	8	16	25	57	−32	20	Relegation to Segunda División

Source: Liga FUTVE, Soccerway
Rules for classification: 1) Points; 2) Goal difference; 3) Goals scored; 4) Head-to-head results; 5) Drawing of lots.
(R) Relegated

=== Results ===
Home \ Away	APC	ANG	CBO	CAR	DLG	TAC	ESM	HCO	MET	MIN	MON	POR	RAY	UCV	ZAM
Academia Puerto Cabello	—	2–0	0–0	2–1	1–0	0–0	1–0	1–0	1–0	2–0	2–0	4–1	3–0	4–0	2–0
Angostura	2–2	—	0–1	2–0	1–2	0–1	2–3	0–0	3–2	2–0	2–0	1–2	1–1	1–1	2–1
Carabobo	0–2	1–1	—	1–1	3–2	1–3	2–0	1–0	2–2	6–1	3–0	1–0	0–0	2–1	3–0
Caracas	2–1	4–1	0–0	—	1–1	2–2	2–2	2–2	2–0	1–1	2–0	1–1	3–3	0–0	4–0
Deportivo La Guaira	2–1	1–0	1–1	2–1	—	0–0	1–3	2–2	2–0	1–1	0–0	2–2	5–3	0–0	3–0
Deportivo Táchira	1–0	1–0	1–0	1–1	2–0	—	3–0	1–0	2–0	4–1	1–0	1–1	5–0	1–1	1–1
Estudiantes de Mérida	1–3	5–0	1–1	0–2	2–1	1–3	—	1–0	0–2	3–1	1–1	0–1	1–2	2–0	2–2
Hermanos Colmenarez	0–1	2–2	2–1	0–0	0–0	3–1	1–0	—	0–1	1–2	2–1	0–2	1–3	1–1	0–2
Metropolitanos	2–1	1–0	1–0	2–2	2–2	2–0	0–1	2–3	—	3–0	3–2	0–1	2–1	1–1	1–2
Mineros de Guayana	0–3	1–2	0–1	1–3	0–2	0–4	1–1	2–2	1–1	—	2–1	0–0	1–0	2–0	1–2
Monagas	3–2	1–0	1–1	0–2	2–2	1–2	1–1	2–1	0–2	3–1	—	1–2	1–3	1–0	2–1
Portuguesa	0–2	0–2	1–1	1–1	2–0	0–1	2–0	1–0	0–1	2–0	1–2	—	1–2	2–0	2–1
Rayo Zuliano	1–0	2–1	0–0	0–0	0–1	1–2	2–1	1–1	1–1	4–4	1–0	1–1	—	0–0	1–1
Universidad Central	2–3	1–2	0–0	0–2	1–1	1–2	3–2	2–1	3–2	2–0	0–2	0–1	2–0	—	5–0
Zamora	1–3	3–2	0–2	1–2	2–1	0–1	1–5	2–0	4–1	1–1	1–1	1–2	0–0	1–0	—

Source: Soccerway
Legend: Blue = home team win; Yellow = draw; Red = away team win.

== Final stage ==
The top four teams in the first stage contested the competition's final stage, playing each other twice. The top two teams advanced to the final and also qualified for the group stage of the 2024 Copa Libertadores, whilst the third- and fourth-placed teams qualified for the preliminary stages of the same competition.

=== Standings ===
Pos	Team	Pld	W	D	L	GF	GA	GD	Pts	Qualification
1	Deportivo Táchira	6	3	3	0	8	3	+5	12	Advance to Final and qualification for Copa Libertadores group stage
2	Caracas	6	2	3	1	5	4	+1	9	Advance to Final and qualification for Copa Libertadores group stage
3	Portuguesa	6	1	3	2	6	9	−3	6	Qualification for Copa Libertadores second stage
4	Academia Puerto Cabello	6	0	3	3	3	6	−3	3	Qualification for Copa Libertadores first stage

Source: Soccerway
Rules for classification: 1) Points; 2) Goal difference; 3) Goals scored; 4) Head-to-head results; 5) Drawing of lots.

=== Results ===
Home \ Away	APC	CAR	TAC	POR
Academia Puerto Cabello	—	0–0	0–1	1–1
Caracas	1–0	—	0–0	2–0
Deportivo Táchira	2–1	1–1	—	3–0
Portuguesa	1–1	3–1	1–1	—

Source: Soccerway
Legend: Blue = home team win; Yellow = draw; Red = away team win.

== Final ==
The final match was hosted by the finalist with the best performance in the first stage of the season.

25 November 2023
17:00 UTC−4

Deportivo Táchira	1–1 (a.e.t.)	Caracas
Castillo 84'	Report	Ortega 90+1'
Penalties
Ritacco (penalty scored); Cova (penalty scored); García (penalty scored); Vivas (penalty scored)	4–1	(penalty missed) Jiménez; (penalty scored) González; (penalty missed) Ortega

Estadio Polideportivo de Pueblo Nuevo, San Cristóbal
Attendance: 38,276
Referee: Jesús Valenzuela

== Top goalscorers ==
Rank	Player	Club	Goals
1	(Venezuela) Luifer Hernández	Academia Puerto Cabello	18
2	(Venezuela) Richard Blanco	Mineros de Guayana / Portuguesa	14
3	(Nigeria) Ade Oguns	Caracas	12
4	(Venezuela) Franklin González	Hermanos Colmenarez	9
4	(Venezuela) Saúl Guarirapa	Caracas	9
4	(Panama) Ervin Zorrilla	Estudiantes de Mérida	9
7	(Venezuela) Edder Farías	Deportivo Táchira / Deportivo La Guaira	8
7	(Venezuela) Charlis Ortiz	Metropolitanos	8
7	(Argentina) Gonzalo Ritacco	Deportivo Táchira	8
7	(Venezuela) Anthony Uribe	Deportivo Táchira	8

Source: Soccerway
