= Gleiker Mendoza =

Venezuelan footballer (born 2001)

Personal information
- Full name: Gleiker Teodoro Mendoza Barrios
- Date of birth: 8 December 2001 (age 24)
- Place of birth: Santa Bárbara del Zulia, Venezuela
- Height: 1.84 m (6 ft 0 in)
- Position: Winger

Team information
- Current team: Shakhtar Donetsk
- Number: 77

Youth career
- 2010–2015: Santa Bárbara
- 2015–2019: Cenfemaca Sports
- 2019–2020: Academia Emeritense
- 2020–2021: Llaneros
- 2021–2023: Angostura FC

Senior career*
Years	Team	Apps	(Gls)
2023–2026	Angostura FC	32	(7)
2024–2025	→ Táchira (loan)	29	(3)
2025–2026	→ Kryvbas Kryvyi Rih (loan)	4	(1)
2026	Kryvbas Kryvyi Rih	26	(11)
2026–	Shakhtar Donetsk	8	(0)

International career^{‡}
2025–	Venezuela	11	(1)
- * Club domestic league appearances and goals as of 19:13, 30 October 2026 (UTC) ‡ National team caps and goals as of 22:00, 2 October 2026 (UTC)

Gleiker Teodoro Mendoza Barrios (born 8 December 2001) is a Venezuelan professional football player who plays as a winger for Ukrainian Premier League club Shakhtar Donetsk and the Venezuela national team.

== Career ==
Mendoza is a product of the youth academies of Santa Bárbara, Cenfemaca Sports, Academia Emeritense, Llaneros and Angostura. He began his senior career with Angostura in 2023 in the Venezuelan Primera División. In 2024 he joined Táchira, and in his debut season helped them win the 2024 Venezuelan Primera División season. On 28 January 2025, he joined the Ukrainian Premier League side Kryvbas on a year-long loan with option to buy.

== International career ==
Mendoza made his debut with the Venezuela national team in a friendly 3–1 loss to the United States on 18 January 2025.

== Career statistics ==
=== Club ===
As of match played 3 November 2026

Appearances and goals by club, season and competition
Club	Season	League			National cup (Note: Includes Copa Venezuela, Ukrainian Cup)		Continental		Other		Total	
Club	Season	Division	Apps	Goals	Apps	Goals	Apps	Goals	Apps	Goals	Apps	Goals
Angostura FC	2021	Liga FUTVE 2	1	1	—		—		—		1	1
Angostura FC	2022	Liga FUTVE 2	5	5	—		—		—		5	5
Angostura FC	2023	Liga FUTVE	26	1	—		—		—		26	1
Angostura FC	Total		32	7	—		—		—		32	7
Táchira (loan)	2024	Liga FUTVE	24	3	1	1	4 (Note: Appearances in Copa Libertadores)	0	—		29	4
Kryvbas Kryvyi Rih (loan)	2024–25	Ukrainian Premier League	4	1	—		—		—		4	1
Kryvbas Kryvyi Rih	2025–26	Ukrainian Premier League	26	11	1	0	—		—		27	11
Shakhtar Donetsk	2026–27	Ukrainian Premier League	8	0	2	1	4 (Note: Appearances in UEFA Champions League)	2	—		14	3
Career total			94	22	4	2	8	2	0	0	106	26

=== International ===
As of match played 2 October 2026

Appearances and goals by national team and year
National team	Year	Apps	Goals
Venezuela	2025	5	0
Venezuela	2026	6	1
Total		11	1

List of international goals scored by Gleiker Mendoza
No.	Date	Venue	Cap	Opponent	Score	Result	Competition
1	6 June 2026	Chase Stadium, Fort Lauderdale, United States	8	Turkey	1–0	1–2	Friendly

== Honours ==
Deportivo Táchira

- Venezuelan Primera División: 2024

Individual

- SportArena Player of the Round: 2025–26 (Round 2, Round 6),
- Ukrainian Premier League Player of the Round: 2025–26 (Round 2, Round 6, Round 8),
- Ukrainian Premier League Player of the Season 2025–26
