= Johanny García =

Venezuelan football manager (born 1988)

Personal information
- Full name: Johanny Antonio García Vera
- Date of birth: 1 July 1988 (age 38)
- Place of birth: Maracaibo, Venezuela
- Position: Defender

Team information
- Current team: Deportivo Rayo Zuliano (manager)

Senior career*
Years	Team	Apps	(Gls)
- Italmaracaibo

International career
2005	Venezuela U17	4	(0)

Managerial career
- 2016–2018: Deportivo JBL (youth)
- 2018–2020: Zulia (youth)
- 2022–2025: Deportivo Rayo Zuliano (assistant)
- 2025–: Deportivo Rayo Zuliano
- * Club domestic league appearances and goals

Johanny Antonio García Vera (born 1 July 1988) is a Venezuelan football manager and former player who played as a defender. He is the current manager of Deportivo Rayo Zuliano.

== Playing career ==
García was a player of Italmaracaibo, and was a part of the Venezuela national under-17 team in the 2005 South American U-17 Championship.

== Managerial career ==
In 2016, García joined Deportivo JBL del Zulia as an assistant of the youth sides, becoming manager of them in July of that year. In 2018, he moved to Zulia to work in the under-16 and under-18 squads.

In 2021, García worked at Deportivo Rayo Zuliano, as a sports coordinator. In the following year, he became an assistant of Alex García King, before becoming the manager of the main squad in May 2025, replacing Javier Villafráz; initially a manager only for the Copa Venezuela matches, he was confirmed as manager in July.
