= Elvis Martínez =

Elvis Martínez may refer to:

- Elvis Martínez (footballer) (born 1970)
- Elvis Martínez (singer) (born 1976)
