= Adrián Sánchez =

Adrián Sánchez may refer to:

- Adrián Sánchez (baseball) (born 1990), Colombian baseball player
- Adrián Sánchez (footballer) (born 1999), Argentine footballer
- Adrián Sánchez (football manager) (born 1990), Venezuelan football manager
- Eydren (born 1996), born Adrián Sánchez, Venezuelan music producer, songwriter and DJ
