= Adrián Sánchez (football manager) =

Venezuelan football manager

Personal information
- Full name: Adrián José Sánchez Gómez
- Date of birth: 24 March 1990 (age 36)
- Place of birth: Barquisimeto, Venezuela

Managerial career
- Years: Team
- 2012–2016: Deportivo Lara (youth)
- 2017: Cantolao (youth)
- 2018: Fundación Lara (youth)
- 2018–2021: Fundación Lara (assistant)
- 2022: Academia Rey
- 2022–2024: Angostura (assistant)
- 2024: Angostura (interim)
- 2025: Anzoátegui (assistant)
- 2026: Anzoátegui

Adrián José Sánchez Gómez (born 24 March 1990) is a Venezuelan football manager.

== Career ==
Born in Barquisimeto, Sánchez began working at hometown side Deportivo Lara's youth sides, before moving to Peru in 2017 Cantolao, working as a consultant for their youth categories. Back to his home country in the following year, he joined the project of Fundación Lara Deportiva; initially an under-17 coach, he was promoted to the first team as an assistant of Osmar Castillo.

Ahead of the 2022 season, Sánchez became the manager of the club in Segunda División, now named Academia Rey, after Castillo left. After managing to avoid relegation, he rejoined Castillo's staff at Angostura, again as his assistant.

In September 2024, after Ariel Guevara was unable to manage Angostura due to registration issues, Sánchez was appointed interim manager of the club. He returned to his previous role after the appointment of Saúl Maldonado late in the month.

Ahead of the 2025 campaign, Sánchez moved to Anzoátegui as an assistant of Leonardo González. On 5 January 2026, he was named manager of the side, but only lasted six matches before being sacked on 11 March.
