= José Rondón (footballer) =

Venezuelan footballer (born 1999)

Personal information
- Full name: José Enrique Rondón Díaz
- Date of birth: 2 November 1999 (age 27)
- Place of birth: Puerto Ordaz, Venezuela
- Height: 1.72 m (5 ft 8 in)
- Position: Forward

Team information
- Current team: Mineros de Guayana
- Number: 7

Youth career
- Mineros de Guayana

Senior career*
Years	Team	Apps	(Gls)
2018–2021	Mineros de Guayana	34	(1)
2020	→ LALA (loan)	4	(1)
2022	Angostura		
2023	Fundación AIFI		
2024	Angostura	13	(0)
2025–	Mineros de Guayana		
- * Club domestic league appearances and goals as of 20:52, 8 February 2022 (UTC)

José Enrique Rondón Díaz (born 2 November 1999) is a Venezuelan professional footballer who plays as a forward for Mineros de Guayana.

== Career ==
=== Club career ===
Rondón is a product of Mineros de Guayana. He got his professional debut for the club on 18 May 2018 against Deportivo Táchira in the Venezuelan Primera División. He made a total of eight appearances in his first season as a professional. In the 2019 season, he played 20 league games for Mineros.

In the 2020 season, Rondón played on loan for fellow league club LALA FC.

In 2022, Rondón played for Angostura. He left the club at the end of the year. In 2023, he played for Fundación AIFI. In January 2024, he moved to Angostura. He left the club again at the end of the year.

In March 2025, Rondón returned to Mineros de Guayana.
