= Iván Fernández =

Iván Fernández may refer to:

- Iván Fernández (athlete) (born 1988), Spanish athlete
- Iván Fernández (football manager) (born 1978), Spanish football manager
