= Carlos Vivas =

Venezuelan footballer (born 2002)

Personal information
- Full name: Carlos Alberto Vivas González
- Date of birth: 4 April 2002 (age 24)
- Place of birth: San Cristóbal, Venezuela
- Height: 1.82 m (6 ft 0 in)
- Position: Centre-back

Team information
- Current team: La Equidad
- Number: 2

Youth career
- Deportivo Táchira

Senior career*
Years	Team	Apps	(Gls)
2018–2025	Deportivo Táchira	83	(4)
2022	Portland Timbers 2 (loan)	22	(1)
2025–	Bogotá	46	(0)

International career^{‡}
2017	Venezuela U15		
2019	Venezuela U17	1	(0)
2023–	Venezuela U23	10	(0)
2023–	Venezuela	4	(0)
- * Club domestic league appearances and goals as of 20 September 2026 ‡ National team caps and goals as of 22:00, 6 October 2026 (UTC)

Carlos Alberto Vivas González (born 4 April 2002) is a Venezuelan footballer who plays as a centre-back for La Equidad and the Venezuela national team.

== Club career ==
=== Deportivo Táchira ===
Born in San Cristóbal, Vivas was a youth product of hometown side Deportivo Táchira. He made his first team debut at the age of 16 on 29 August 2018, starting in a 2–1 away loss to Zamora, for the year's Copa Venezuela.

Vivas made his Liga FUTVE debut on 4 October 2019, playing the full 90 minutes in a 4–1 home routing of Llaneros. He started to feature more regularly during the 2020 season, and scored his first senior goal on 22 November of that year, netting his team's third in a 3–0 away win over Metropolitanos.

After being a starter during the 2020 campaign, Vivas became a backup to Lucas Trejo and Jesús Quintero in 2021.

==== Loan to Portland Timbers ====
On 28 March 2022, Major League Soccer side Portland Timbers announced Vivas as an addition for their reserve team Portland Timbers 2. He was a regular starter for the club during the MLS Next Pro, scoring once in 22 appearances.

==== Return from loan ====
Back to Táchira ahead of the 2023 season, Vivas would spend the first 11 matches of the season as an unused substitute, before playing his first match in May. He would later establish himself as a first-choice, helping the club to win two consecutive Liga FUTVE titles in 2023 and 2024; in the latter tournament, he was also named MVP.

== International career ==
In 2017, Vivas was a part of the Venezuela under-15 squad for the 2017 South American U-15 Championship. He was also a part of the under-17s in the 2019 South American U-17 Championship, but only featured once in the tournament.

In June 2023, Vivas was included in Ricardo Valiño's 24-man list for the 2023 Maurice Revello Tournament with the under-23s. He featured in the nation's three matches in the competition, all as a starter.

On 12 June 2023, Vivas received his first call-up to the full side, for two friendlies against Honduras and Guatemala held in the United States. He made his debut with the senior side on 11 December, starting in a 1–0 non-FIFA friendly loss to Colombia at the DRV PNK Stadium in Fort Lauderdale, Florida, as the national side was composed exclusively of under-23 players.

Vivas returned to the under-23 side for the 2024 CONMEBOL Pre-Olympic Tournament, where he captained the team during the entire competition. He was also named in Fernando Batista's provisional 30-man list for the 2024 Copa América, but was one of the four players cut from the final squad.

== Career statistics ==
=== Club ===
As of 20 September 2026.

Club	Season	League			Cup (Note: Includes Copa Venezuela)		Continental		Other		Total		
Club	Season	Division	Apps	Goals	Apps	Goals	Apps	Goals	Apps	Goals	Apps	Goals	
Deportivo Táchira	2018	Liga FUTVE	0	0	2	0	0	0	—		2	0	
Deportivo Táchira	2019	Liga FUTVE	2	0	1	0	0	0	—		3	0	
Deportivo Táchira	2020	Liga FUTVE	17	1	—		2 (Note: Appearance(s) in Copa Libertadores)	0	—		19	1	
Deportivo Táchira	2021	Liga FUTVE	17	1	—		5	0	—		22	1	
Deportivo Táchira	2023	Liga FUTVE	20	0	—		0	0	—		20	0	
Deportivo Táchira	2024	Liga FUTVE	27	2	1	0	5	0	—		33	2	
Deportivo Táchira	2025	Liga FUTVE	19	0	0	0	4	0	—		23	0	
Deportivo Táchira	Total		102	4	4	0	16	0	—		122	4	
Portland Timbers 2 (loan)	2022	MLS Next Pro	22	1	—		—		—		22	1	
Bogotá	2025	Liga DIMAYOR	17	0	—		—		—		17	0	
Bogotá	2026	Liga DIMAYOR	29	0	2	0	—		—		31	0	
Bogotá	Total	Liga DIMAYOR	46	0	2	0	—		—		48	0	
Bogotá	Career total			170	5	6	0	16	0	0	0	192	5

=== International ===
As of match played 6 October 2026

Appearances and goals by national team and year
National team	Year	Apps	Goals
Venezuela	2025	1	0
Venezuela	2026	3	0
Total		4	0

== Honours ==
Deportivo Táchira

- Liga FUTVE: 2021, 2023, 2024
