= Diego Merino (footballer) =

Spanish footballer and manager

Personal information
- Full name: Diego Merino Rivera
- Date of birth: 19 June 1988 (age 38)
- Place of birth: Mérida, Spain
- Position: Midfielder

Team information
- Current team: Deportivo Pasto (manager)

Youth career
- Mérida UD

Senior career*
Years	Team	Apps	(Gls)
- Miajadas
2008–2009	Valdelacalzada		

Managerial career
- 2009–2011: Emérita Augusta
- 2011–2012: Valdelacalzada
- 2012–2015: Rayo Vallecano (youth)
- 2015–2016: Rayo Vallecano B
- 2016: Extremadura
- 2017–2018: Atlético Astorga
- 2018–2019: Moralo
- 2019–2020: Mérida AD
- 2021: Toledo
- 2023: Coria
- 2024–2025: Carabobo
- 2025: La Equidad
- 2026–: Deportivo Pasto
- * Club domestic league appearances and goals

Diego Merino Rivera (born 19 June 1988) is a Spanish football manager and former footballer who played as a midfielder. He is the current manager of Colombian club Deportivo Pasto.

== Career ==
Born in Mérida, Extremadura, Merino was a Mérida UD youth graduate, and represented CD Miajadas and CD Valdelacalzada as a senior before retiring at the age of 21 due to a knee injury. He then started his managerial career at the helm of EF Emérita Augusta, before returning to Valdelacalzada to take over their first team in Tercera División in 2011.

In 2012, after avoiding relegation with the club, Merino moved to Rayo Vallecano as manager of the Juvenil B team. On 21 July 2015, after two years in charge of the Juvenil A squad, he was named manager of the reserves.

On 7 June 2016, Merino left Rayo to take over Segunda División B side Extremadura UD. On 11 October, after only two wins in ten matches, he was sacked.

On 13 July 2017, Merino was appointed manager of Atlético Astorga FC in the fourth tier. He took over fellow league team Moralo CP on 29 May of the following year, leaving the latter on 21 June 2019 after missing out promotion in the play-offs.

On 9 October 2019, Merino returned to the third level after being named Mérida AD manager. He was dismissed the following 23 February, and spent nearly a year unemployed before being appointed at the helm of CD Toledo on 5 February 2021.

Merino led Toledo to a promotion to Segunda División RFEF in his first season, but was relieved from his duties on 28 October 2021. After more than a year without a club, he was appointed CD Coria manager on 21 March 2023.

Merino left Coria after their relegation to Tercera Federación, and moved abroad for the first time in his career on 22 November 2023, after taking over Venezuelan Primera División side Carabobo FC. He led the latter to the 2024 Apertura title, and subsequently finished as season runners-up and qualified for the 2025 Copa Libertadores.

Merino left Carabobo on 30 May 2025, and was appointed as manager of Colombian club La Equidad four days later. He left La Equidad on a mutual agreement on 8 October 2025, with the team having won only two out of 14 matches in the 2025 Finalización tournament.

On 12 October 2026, Merino returned to Colombia after being appointed as manager of Liga DIMAYOR club Deportivo Pasto.

== Managerial statistics ==
As of 7 October 2025

Managerial record by team and tenure
Team	Nat	From	To	Record								Ref
Team	Nat	From	To	G	W	D	L	GF	GA	GD	Win %	Ref
Emérita Augusta	(Spain)	1 July 2009	20 May 2011	76	31	17	28	128	99	+29	40.79	
Valdelacalzada	(Spain)	20 May 2011	30 June 2012	38	10	15	13	31	42	−11	26.32	
Rayo Vallecano B	(Spain)	21 July 2015	7 June 2016	38	10	16	12	44	42	+2	26.32	
Extremadura	(Spain)	7 June 2016	11 October 2016	10	2	3	5	11	14	−3	20.00	
Atlético Astorga	(Spain)	13 July 2017	29 May 2018	38	20	13	5	66	34	+32	52.63	
Moralo	(Spain)	29 May 2018	21 June 2019	42	27	6	9	66	25	+41	64.29	
Mérida AD	(Spain)	8 October 2019	23 February 2020	21	2	13	6	21	29	−8	9.52	
Toledo	(Spain)	5 February 2021	28 October 2021	24	10	6	8	32	24	+8	41.67	
Coria	(Spain)	21 March 2023	22 June 2023	10	2	4	4	10	13	−3	20.00	
Carabobo	(Venezuela)	22 November 2023	30 May 2025	70	27	25	18	77	67	+10	38.57	
La Equidad	(Colombia)	4 June 2025	8 October 2025	17	2	5	10	8	25	−17	11.76	
Total				384	143	123	118	494	414	+80	37.24	—
