= Óscar Conde =

Venezuelan footballer (born 2002)

Personal information
- Full name: Óscar Iván Conde Chourio
- Date of birth: 6 June 2002 (age 24)
- Place of birth: Maracay, Venezuela
- Height: 1.81 m (5 ft 11 in)
- Position: Defender

Team information
- Current team: Deportivo Rayo Zuliano
- Number: 17

Senior career*
Years	Team	Apps	(Gls)
2018–2025	Academia Puerto Cabello	23	(1)
2025	→ Deportivo Rayo Zuliano (loan)	7	(0)
2026–	Deportivo Rayo Zuliano	6	(0)

International career^{‡}
2019	Venezuela U17	4	(0)
2020–	Venezuela	1	(0)
- * Club domestic league appearances and goals as of 11 March 2026 ‡ National team caps and goals as of 20:11, 20 November 2020 (UTC)

Óscar Iván Conde Chourio (born 6 June 2002) is a Venezuelan footballer who plays as a defender for Deportivo Rayo Zuliano.

== Career statistics ==
=== Club ===
As of 21 January 2020.

Club	Season	League			Cup		Continental		Other		Total	
Club	Season	Division	Apps	Goals	Apps	Goals	Apps	Goals	Apps	Goals	Apps	Goals
Academia Puerto Cabello	2018	Venezuelan Primera División	3	0	0	0	0	0	0	0	3	0
Academia Puerto Cabello	2019	Venezuelan Primera División	0	0	0	0	0	0	0	0	0	0
Academia Puerto Cabello	2020	Venezuelan Primera División	8	1	0	0	0	0	0	0	8	1
Career total			11	1	0	0	0	0	0	0	11	1

=== International ===
In June 2022, he took part in the Maurice Revello Tournament in France with Venezuela team.

As of matches played 20 November 2020.

National team	Year	Apps	Goals
Venezuela	2020	1	0
Total		1	0
