= Por ella soy Eva =

Mexican telenovela

- Genre: Telenovela
- Based on: En los tacones de Eva by Elkin Opina, Fernán Rivera, and Juan Carlos Troncoso
- Screenplay by: Alejandra Romero; Pedro Armando Rodríguez; Humberto Robles
- Directed by: Benjamín Cann
- Creative director: Florencio Zavala
- Starring: Lucero; Jaime Camil
- Opening theme: "Por ella soy Eva" by Jaime Camil
- Ending theme: "No Me Dejes Ir" by Lucero Hogaza León
- Country of origin: Mexico
- Original language: Spanish
- No. of episodes: 166

Production
- Executive producer: Rosy Ocampo
- Producer: Eduardo Meza
- Production locations: Mexico City; Acapulco; Zihuatanejo
- Cinematography: Daniel Ferrer; Alejandro Álvarez Ceniceros
- Editor: Pablo Peralta
- Camera setup: Multi-camera
- Production company: Televisa

Original release
- Network: Canal de las Estrellas
- Release: February 20 – October 7, 2012

Por Ella Soy Eva (International Title: Me, Her... and Eva!, / Lit: For Her, I’m Eva) is a Mexican telenovela produced by Rosy Ocampo for Televisa based on the Colombian soap opera En los tacones de Eva.

Starring Lucero, Jaime Camil, Jesús Ochoa, and Patricia Navidad as the main protagonists, actresses Leticia Perdigón and Helena Rojo as the co-protagonists, and Mariana Seoane, Marcelo Córdoba, Luis Manuel Ávila, and Roberto Ballesteros as the main antagonists. Also appearing were Carlos de la Mota, Pablo Valentín, Tiaré Scanda, Dalilah Polanco, Ferdinando Valencia, Manuel Ojeda and Carlos Bracho; as well as appearances by Christina Pastor, Martha Julia, Latín Lover, Eduardo Santamarina, Otto Sirgo, Fabiola Guajardo, María Isabel Benet, and Susana Zabaleta.

On February 20, 2012, Canal de las Estrellas started broadcasting Por ella soy Eva weeknights at 8:15pm, replacing Una familia con suerte. The last episode was broadcast on October 7, with Porque el amor manda replacing it the following day. Production of Por Ella Soy Eva officially started on November 15, 2011.

As part of the 2012–2013 schedule, Univision confirmed a primetime broadcast of Por ella soy Eva. The first promo was broadcast on June 10, 2012. Prior to the premiere, a sneak peek was shown on July 10.

On July 16, Univision started broadcasting Por ella soy Eva weeknights at 8pm/7c, replacing one hour of Un Refugio para el Amor. The last episode was broadcast on March 8, 2013, with Porque el amor manda replacing it on March 11.

== Plot ==
Juan Carlos Caballero Mistral is a busy man working in Grupo Imperio. He is a womanizer who can never get enough. Juan feels he just enjoys the company of women. Everyone in the industry feels he is just a man who plays with women's feelings. But when Helena Moreno Romero, a single mother of one son and an ex-employee of Grupo Imperio, enters Juan Carlos' life, he begins to have feelings for Helena, something he has never felt before. Helena regains her position at Grupo Imperio and starts a huge project. They fall helplessly in love with each other and plan to marry and start a family with Helena's son, Eduardo "Lalito". Although, given his background, Helena hates Juan Carlos Caballero and Juan Carlos pretends he is Juan Perón, son of an Argentinian ambassador. Helena finds this out and is heartbroken. She feels Juan tricked her and was looking for another "adventure," and also feels he tried to steal the project she had been working hard on. Later Plutarco Ramos Arrieta frames him for embezzlement. While in his car, Juan Carlos hears the police sirens. He is chased by the police until he falls of a cliff and his car explodes. Thinking he is dead, the authorities publicize the message that Juan Carlos is dead. Helena is mourning and feels she will never forget her great love for him. Meanwhile, Juan Carlos is still alive but in hiding. He meets Mimi de La Rosa and they become extraordinary friends. He tells her his whole story and how he must clear his name. Mimi helps him transform from Juan Carlos Caballero to Eva Maria Leon Jaramillo viuda de Zuloaga. He watches out for Helena and her son while trying to find evidence to clear his name. Although it becomes a very different and difficult life being a lady, Juan Carlos starts to realize his mistake and the consequences of being a womanizer. Eva/Juan applies for a job as Helena's assistant. She/he gets the job and at first, does not get along well with Helena. But soon they become the best of friends. Plutarco falls in love with Helena and becomes Juan's biggest enemy. Plutarco proposes to Helena, and Helena accepts. Although Plutarco had a wife, Antonia Reyes de Ramos who died of a heart attack, he also has an ex-lover, Rebeca Oropeza. Rebeca becomes his worst enemy; she is determined to ruin their relationship. But Juan is crushed and gives Helena every reason to hate Plutarco. As Eva, Juan will regain Helena's love, clear his name and realize his dream of being married and having a family with her.

== Cast ==
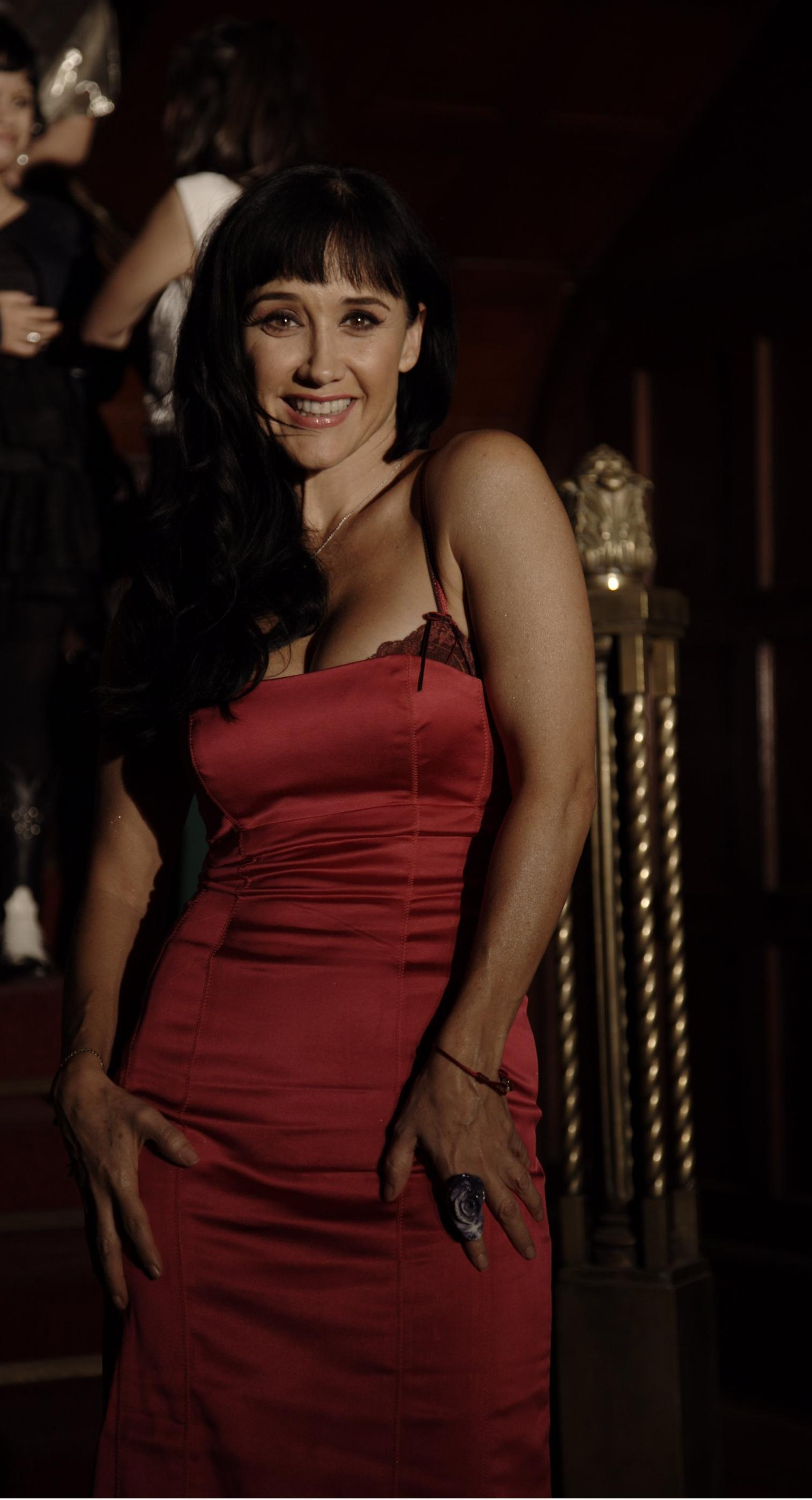
Susana Zabaleta as the real Eva María Leon Jaramillo Vda. de Zuloaga

=== Main cast ===
- Lucero as Helena Moreno Romero de Caballero
- Jaime Camil as Juan Carlos Caballero Mistral / Eva León Jaramillo Vda. de Zuloaga
- Helena Rojo as Doña Eugenia Mistral de Caballero
- Patricia Navidad as Mimí de la Rosa "De la Rose" / Emeteria Jaramillo
- Mariana Seoane as Rebecca Oropeza Pérez
- Leticia Perdigón as Doña Silvia Romero Ruíz de Moreno
- Jesús Ochoa as Don Adriano Reyes Mendieta
- Marcelo Córdoba as Don Plutarco Ramos Arrieta

=== Also as main ===
- Ferdinando Valencia as Luis Renato Caballero Camargo
- Manuel Ojeda as Don Eduardo Moreno Landeros
- Carlos Bracho as Don Modesto Caballero
- Carlos de la Mota as Santiago Escudero del Real
- Pablo Valentín as Fernando Contreras
- Tiaré Scanda as Marcela Noriega de Contreras
- Luis Manuel Avila as Onésimo Garza Torres-Treviño
- Gabriela Zamora as Angélica Ortega Pérez
- Dalilah Polanco as Lucia Zarate
- Geraldine Galván as Jennifer María del Rocío Contreras Noriega
- Daniel Díaz de León as Kevin José Contreras Noriega
- Nikolas Caballero as Eduardo "Lalito" Moreno Romero
- Enrique Montaño as Daniel Merino
- Ilse Zamarripa as Claudia Caballero Camargo
- Priscila Avellaneda as Vero
- Ivonne Garza as Cindy
- Marisol Castillo as Jacqueline
- Guadalupe Bolaños as Nelly
- Roberto Ballesteros as Lic. Rául Mendoza
- Héctor Ortega as Don Richard Fairbanks

=== Special participation ===
- Susana Zabaleta as Doña Eva María León Jaramillo viuda de Zuloaga / Doña Yadira Rivers
- Roger Cudney as Mr. Keaton
- Laura Carmine as Camila de Fairbanks
- Julio Bracho as Dagoberto Preciado
- Maria Isabel Benet as Carmen Camargo
- Adrián Uribe as Isidro “Chilo” Chávez
- Christina Pastor as Antonia Reyes Mendieta de Ramos
- Arturo Carmona as Mario Lizárraga
- Manuela Ímaz as Patricia Lorca Beristáin
- Luis Gatica as Gustavo
- Eduardo Santamarina as Diego Fonticoda
- Martha Julia as Samantha Millan
- Shaila Dúrcal as Cecilia Montiel Rivadeneyra
- Fabiola Guajardo as Paola Legarreta
- Otto Sirgo as Don Jesús Legarreta
- Latín Lover as Maximiliano "Gino" Montes

== Reception ==
Univision's July 17 premiere of Por ella soy Eva averaged 3.7 million viewers. The March 8 finale broadcast averaged 6.6 million viewers, becoming the most watched program Friday night.

== Awards ==
=== TVyNovelas Awards 2013 ===
Nominations were confirmed on April 8, 2013. The winners were announced on April 28, 2013.

Category	Nominee	Result
Best Telenovela of the Year	Rosy Ocampo	Won
Best Lead Actress	Lucero	Nominated
Best Lead Actor	Jaime Camil	Nominated
Best Female Antagonist	Mariana Seoane	Nominated
Best Male Antagonist	Marcelo Córdoba	Won
Best Young Lead Actor	Ferdinando Valencia	Won
Best Co-star Actress	Patricia Navidad	Won
Best Co-star Actor	Jesús Ochoa	Won
Best First Actress	Helena Rojo	Nominated
Best First Actor	Manuel Ojeda	Nominated
Best Supporting Actress	Tiaré Scanda	Nominated
Best Supporting Actor	Pablo Valentín	Nominated
Best Original Story or Adaptation	Pedro Rodríguez, Alejandra Romero and Humberto Robles	Nominated
Best Direction of the Camaras	Benjamín Cann and Rodrigo Zaunbos	Won

==== Los Favoritos del Público ====
Nominations were confirmed on April 8, 2013. The winners were announced on April 27, 2013.

Category	Nominee	Result
Favorite Telenovela	Por ella soy Eva by Rosy Ocampo	Nominated
Favorite Couple	Lucero and Jaime Camil	Nominated
The Most Beautiful Women	Lucero	Nominated
The Most Handsome Guy	Ferdinando Valencia	Nominated
Favorite Slap	Lucero slapping Jaime Camil; When Helena and Juan Carlos are at the delegation)	Nominated
Favorite Kiss	Lucero and Jaime Camil	Nominated
Favorite Finale	"Por Ella Soy Eva" by Rosy Ocampo	Won
