= Radamel García =

Colombian footballer (1957–2019)

Personal information
- Full name: Radamel Enrique García King
- Date of birth: 16 April 1957
- Place of birth: Santa Marta, Colombia
- Date of death: 3 January 2019 (aged 61)
- Place of death: Santa Marta, Colombia
- Height: 1.80 m (5 ft 11 in)
- Position: Defender

Senior career*
Years	Team	Apps	(Gls)
1977–1982	Santa Fe	111	(4)
1982	Atlético Junior	9	(0)
1983	Sanfa Fe	41	(1)
1984–1987	Unión Magdalena	128	(6)
1988	Deportes Tolima	31	(1)
1989	Atlético Bucaramanga	33	(2)
1990	Independiente Medellín	7	(0)
1991–1992	Deportivo Táchira		
1993–1994	Mineros de Guayana		
1995	Monagas SC		
1996	Atlético El Vigía		

International career
1978–1988	Colombia	1	(0)
- * Club domestic league appearances and goals

Radamel Enrique García King (16 April 1957 – 3 January 2019) was a Colombian footballer who played as a defender. He competed in the men's tournament at the 1980 Summer Olympics.

== Personal life and death ==
García was the father of Colombian international, Radamel Falcao García. His brothers Alex García King and Herbert King were also a footballer and an actor, respectively.

García died on 3 January 2019, aged 61.
