= Johao Martínez =

Venezuelan footballer (born 1999)

Personal information
- Full name: Johao Alberto Martínez Villegas
- Date of birth: 14 August 1999 (age 27)
- Place of birth: Maracaibo, Venezuela
- Height: 1.80 m (5 ft 11 in)
- Position: Midfielder

Team information
- Current team: Deportivo Rayo Zuliano
- Number: 5

Youth career
- –2017: Zulia

Senior career*
Years	Team	Apps	(Gls)
2017–2021	Zulia	21	(0)
2021–2022	Atlético Chiriquí	15	(0)
2022	BFC Daugavpils	17	(0)
2023–2024	Deportivo Rayo Zuliano	20	(0)
2025–	Deportivo Rayo Zuliano	3	(0)
- * Club domestic league appearances and goals as of 11 March 2026

Johao Alberto Martínez Villegas (born 20 April 1999) is a Venezuelan footballer who plays as a midfielder for Venezuelan Primera División side Deportivo Rayo Zuliano.

== Club career ==
Martínez made his senior debut in a Derby del Lago win against JBL Zulia.

== Career statistics ==
=== Club ===
As of 20 October 2019.

Club	Season	League			Cup		Continental		Other		Total	
Club	Season	Division	Apps	Goals	Apps	Goals	Apps	Goals	Apps	Goals	Apps	Goals
Zulia	2017	Primera División	11	0	1 (Note: Appearances in the Copa Venezuela)	0	1 (Note: Appearances in the Copa Libertadores)	0	0	0	13	0
Zulia	2018	Primera División	1	0	0	0	0	0	0	0	1	0
Zulia	2019	Primera División	9	0	0	0	0	0	0	0	9	0
Career total			21	0	1	0	1	0	0	0	23	0
