= En los tacones de Eva =

Colombian telenovela

- Genre: Telenovela
- Created by: Elkin Ospina; Juan Carlos Troncoso; Fernán Rivera
- Directed by: Juan Camilo Pinzón
- Creative director: Jack Triana
- Starring: See list
- Music by: Oliver Camargo; José Carlos María; Nicolás Uribe
- Opening theme: "Señor" by Helenita Vargas
- Country of origin: Colombia
- Original language: Spanish
- No. of episodes: 155

Production
- Executive producer: James Ordonez
- Producer: Yuldor Gutiérrez
- Production location: Bogotá
- Cinematography: Jorge Bastos
- Editor: Adriana Falla
- Camera setup: Multi-camera
- Production company: RCN Televisión

Original release
- Network: RCN
- Release: November 14, 2006 – May 22, 2008

Related
- Por ella soy Eva

En los tacones de Eva (English: In Eva's Heels) is a Colombian telenovela created by Elkin Opina, Fernán Rivera and Juan Carlos Troncoso that premiered on RCN Televisión on November 14, 2006, and concluded on May 22, 2008.

== Plot ==
The series revolves around of Juan Camilo Caballero (Jorge Enrique Abello), a man who for love is able to become a woman without imagining all the problems that this could cause.

== Cast ==
=== Main ===
- Jorge Enrique Abello as Juan Camilo / Eva María León Jaramillo Viuda de Zuloaga
- Mónica Lopera as Isabella Nieto
- Manuela González as Lucía
- Patrick Forster-Delmas as Cristóbal
- Antonio Sanint as Santiago
- Frank Ramírez as Jesús
- Julio Echeverry as Fernando
- Jacques Toukhmanian as Alexis
- Adriana Ricardo as Marcela
- Alejandra Azcárate as Laura
- Vicky Hernández as Lucrecía de Nieto
- Jairo Camargo as Ricardo
- Carlos Barbosa as Olimpo
- Jorge Herrera as Domingo
- Sara Corrales as Angélica
- John Ceballos as Gregorio
- Gustavo Angarita as Modesto
- Ana María Kámper as Maruja

=== Recurring ===
- Andrea Gómez as Ana
- Belky Arizala as Jackie
- Christian Ruiz as Johnatan
- Fabián Mendoza as Andrés
- Felipe Calero as Tom Stevenson
- Herbert King as Tobías
- Isabella Santo Domingo as Victoria Morales
- Joavany Álvarez as Oliver
- Julián Arango as Mario de La Espriella Lombardi
- Julio César Herrera as Nelson Betancourt
- Luis Fernando Salas as Nardo
- María Fernanda Yepes as Valentina
- Sofía Jaramillo as Cameron Cifuentes Araujo
