= Monica Lopera =

Colombian-American actress

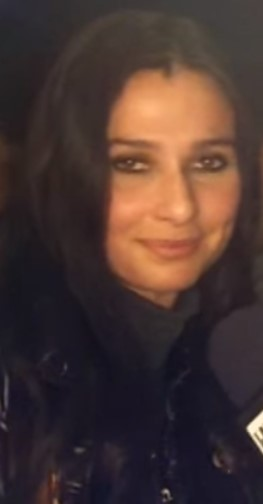
- Mónica Lopera, 2011
- Born: Monica Lopera Cossio; September 10, 1985 (age 40); Miami, Florida, United States
- Citizenship: Colombian American
- Occupation: Actress
- Years active: 1999–present

Mónica Lopera Cossio (born September 10, 1985) is a Colombian-American actress of film, television and theater.

== Early life ==
Lopera was born in Miami, Florida to an American father and Colombian mother. When Monica was 2 years old, her parents took her to Medellín, and when she was 14 they left Medellín to move to Bogotá, Colombia. Her inclination for art began at age 6 when her mother decided to enroll her in a children's theater school. To continue her training and improve her English language, she moved to London, England for 5 years.

== Career ==
In her first soap opera, Francisco el Matemático, she began her evolution as an actress. She has starred in soap operas such as In Eva's Heels and An angel named Blue.

She appeared as Susannah in the 2016 film Between Two Worlds, with Chris Mason.

In 2019, she joined the voice cast of Thomas & Friends as the voice of Gabriela in the UK/US versions, respectively.

== Filmography ==
=== Film ===
Year	Title	Role	Notes
2003	El carro	Narrator (voice)	
2015	Antes del fuego	Milena	
2016	Between Two Worlds	Susannah	
2017	One Way Flight	Daniela	Short film
2016	Truck	Ana	Short film
2020	Loco Por Vos	Johanna Jaramilo	

=== Television ===
Year	Title	Role	Notes
1999	Francisco the Mathematician	Clara Arango (2000–2003)	Episode: "#1.5"
2003	An Angel Named Blue	Martina Luna / Aurora Luna	3 episodes
2006–2008	In Eva's Heels	Isabella Nieto	155 episodes
2011	The Borgias	María Enríquez de Luna	4 episodes
2019–2020	Thomas & Friends	Gabriela (voice)	UK/US versions
2019–2025	The Adventures of Paddington	Sofia (voice)	117 episodes
2022	Killing Eve	Fernanda	2 episodes
2024	The Hijacking of Flight 601	Edilma Perez	Television miniseries
2025	The Bombing of Pan Am 103	Mia	Television miniseries
