= Javier Villafráz =

Venezuelan football manager (born 1980)

Personal information
- Full name: José Javier Villafráz Quintero
- Date of birth: 1 January 1980 (age 46)
- Place of birth: Mérida, Venezuela
- Height: 1.78 m (5 ft 10 in)
- Position: Midfielder

Team information
- Current team: Aragua (manager)

Youth career
- Estudiantes de Mérida

Senior career*
Years	Team	Apps	(Gls)
1998–2003	Estudiantes de Mérida		
2003–2004	Maracaibo		(1)
2004	Estudiantes de Mérida		(4)
2004–2005	Italmaracaibo	31	(4)
2005–2012	Deportivo Táchira	153	(37)
2012–2014	Aragua	37	(3)
2014	Zulia	14	(1)
2014–2015	Portuguesa	11	(1)
2015	Zulia	14	(0)
2016	Ureña	13	(5)
2017	El Vigía		
2017–2018	Titanes		
2018	Academia Élite		

International career
1999	Venezuela U20		(1)
2000–2007	Venezuela	17	(1)

Managerial career
- 2024: Deportivo Rayo Zuliano (youth)
- 2024–2025: Deportivo Rayo Zuliano
- 2026–: Aragua
- * Club domestic league appearances and goals

José Javier Villafráz Quintero (born 1 January 1980) is a Venezuelan football manager and former player who played as a midfielder. He is the current manager of Aragua.

== Club career ==
Born in Mérida, Villafráz began his career with Estudiantes de Mérida, making his first team debut in 1998. In 2003, he moved to Maracaibo, but returned to Estudiantes the following January.

In 2005, after a one-year spell at Deportivo Italmaracaibo, Villafráz signed for Deportivo Táchira. He played for seven seasons with the side, winning two Primera División titles in 2007–08 and 2010–11.

In 2012, Villafráz joined Aragua, but left on 16 November 2023 after losing his starting spot. He was presented at Zulia on 7 January 2014, and subsequently spent a short period at Portuguesa before returning to Zulia on 2 January 2015.

On 8 January 2016, Villafráz moved to Ureña, but spent the entire Apertura tournament sidelined due to an injury. He subsequently played for Atlético El Vigía, Titanes and Academia Élite before retiring.

== International career ==
Villafráz made his full international debut with the Venezuela national team in 2000. He was included in Richard Páez's provisional 27-man list for the 2007 Copa América, but was cut from the final squad.

== Managerial career ==
After retiring, Villafráz was a youth coach at Deportivo Rayo Zuliano before taking over the main squad on 26 August 2024, replacing Elvis Martínez.
