= Osmar Castillo =

Venezuelan football manager

Personal information
- Full name: Osmar Eduardo Castillo Rojas
- Date of birth: 3 August 1978 (age 48)
- Place of birth: Cabudare, Venezuela

Team information
- Current team: Angostura (manager)

Managerial career
- Years: Team
- Fundación Lara (youth)
- 2018–2021: Academia Rey
- 2022: Deportivo Lara (assistant)
- 2022–2024: Angostura
- 2025–: Angostura

Osmar Eduardo Castillo Rojas (born 3 August 1978) is a Venezuelan football manager, currently in charge of Angostura.

== Career ==
Born in Cabudare, Castillo started working as manager at several local sides in Lara state. He led Fundación Lara Deportiva to a first-ever promotion to the Segunda División in 2019, after winning the Tercera División promotion play-offs. After being in charge of the side during the 2020 and 2021 seasons (as the club was named Academia Rey), the side confirmed his departure on 24 March 2022.

Castillo was an assistant of Jorge Durán at Deportivo Lara, before taking over Angostura in the second division on 2 June 2022. At the end of the season, he led the team to a first-ever promotion to the Primera División as champions.

Castillo led Angostura to a mid-table finish in the 2023 season, and also qualified the club to the final rounds of the 2024 Apertura tournament. On 6 September 2024, however, he left the club by mutual consent after a poor performance in the Clausura tournament, but returned to the club the following 12 January, now back in the second division.

== Honours ==
Angostura

- Venezuelan Segunda División: 2022
