= Eduardo Saragó =

Venezuelan football manager

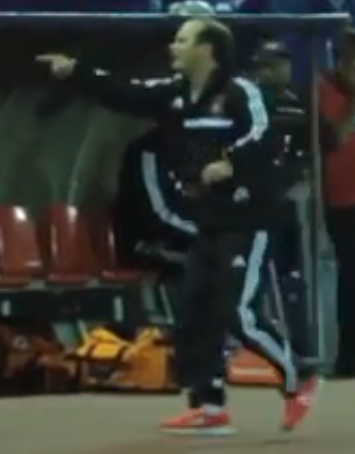
- Saragó managing Caracas in 2014

Personal information
- Full name: Eduardo José Saragó Carbón
- Date of birth: 11 January 1982 (age 44)
- Place of birth: Caracas, Venezuela

Team information
- Current team: Academia Puerto Cabello (manager)

Senior career*
Years	Team	Apps	(Gls)
- Caracas
- Italchacao

Managerial career
- Centro Italo Venezolano (youth)
- Caracas (assistant)
- 2006–2007: Venezuela U20 (assistant)
- 2008: Zamora
- 2008–2011: Deportivo Petare
- 2011–2012: Deportivo Lara
- 2013–2015: Caracas
- 2016–2017: Deportivo La Guaira
- 2022: Deportivo Lara
- 2022–2024: Deportivo Táchira
- 2025–: Academia Puerto Cabello
- * Club domestic league appearances and goals

Eduardo José Saragó Carbón (born 11 January 1982) is a Venezuelan football manager and former player. He is the current manager of Academia Puerto Cabello.

== Career ==
Born in Caracas, Saragó had brief spells for hometown side Caracas and Italchacao as a player, before retiring. He started working at the youth schools of Fray Luis and San Agustín del Marques, before later taking over the youth sides of Centro Italo Venezolano and then being an assistant manager of the Venezuela national under-20 team.

In 2008, Saragó was appointed manager of Zamora for the Clausura tournament, and led the side to a seventh position. In July of that year, he took over Deportivo Italia, leading the side to the first position in the 2008 Apertura and later losing the Finals to Caracas; he later continued at the club when they changed name to Deportivo Petare in 2010.

Saragó resigned from Petare in May 2011, and was presented as manager of Deportivo Lara on 5 June 2011. On 12 December 2012, despite lifting the trophy in the 2011–12 season with only one loss, he resigned.

On 17 May 2013, Saragó was appointed manager of Caracas. He left on 27 November 2015, after the campaign ended, and was named at the helm of Deportivo La Guaira the following 31 May.

Saragó left La Guaira on a mutual agreement on 7 July 2017, and remained five years without managing before returning to Deportivo Lara on 19 July 2022. Eight days later, however, he resigned after the club's board could not comply with the initially agreed requests.

On 20 August 2022, Saragó replaced Alex Pallarés at the helm of Deportivo Táchira. He won the 2023 title, but resigned on 30 October 2024.

On 3 June 2025, Saragó became Academia Puerto Cabello's third manager of the season.

== Honours ==
Deportivo Lara

- Venezuelan Primera División: 2011–12

Caracas

- Copa Venezuela: 2013

Deportivo Táchira

- Venezuelan Primera División: 2023
