= Alí Cañas =

Venezuelan football manager (born 1960)

Personal information
- Full name: José Alí Cañas Navas
- Date of birth: 19 June 1960 (age 66)
- Place of birth: Mérida, Venezuela
- Position: Forward

Team information
- Current team: Deportivo Táchira (assistant)

Senior career*
Years	Team	Apps	(Gls)
1976	Portuguesa		
1976–1980	Estudiantes de Mérida		
1985–1986	ULA		
1987	Estudiantes de Mérida		

Managerial career
- 1992–2000: Venezuela (assistant)
- 1998: Zulia (assistant)
- 1998: Monagas
- 2001–2002: Estudiantes de Mérida (assistant)
- 2003: Maracaibo
- 2003–2005: Monagas
- 2006: Ghana (assistant)
- 2007: Monagas
- 2008: Mineros
- 2009: Estrella Roja
- 2010–2011: Monagas
- 2012–2013: Yaracuyanos
- 2014–2015: Deportivo Lara (assistant)
- 2016–2017: Deportivo Lara
- 2017–2019: Zamora
- 2020–2022: Portuguesa
- 2023: Estudiantes de Mérida
- 2024: Zamora
- 2025–: Deportivo Táchira
- * Club domestic league appearances and goals

José Alí Cañas Navas (born 19 June 1960) is a Venezuelan football manager and former player who played as a forward. He is the current assistant manager of Deportivo Táchira.

Cañas is the youngest Venezuelan to feature in a Copa Libertadores match, playing at the age of 15 in the 1976 edition. He is also the only Venezuelan manager to take part of a FIFA World Cup, after being an assistant of Ratomir Dujković in the Ghana national team for the 2006 edition.

== Career ==
Born in Mérida, Cañas played one Copa Libertadores match for Portuguesa before moving to Estudiantes de Mérida in 1976. He left the club in 1980, and subsequently represented Universidad de Los Andes before returning to Estudiantes in 1987.

Shortly after retiring, Cañas became Ratomir Dujković's assistant at the Venezuela national team. He also worked under the same role with subsequent managers Eduardo Borrero and José Omar Pastoriza, while also assisting Dujković at Zulia in 1998; in that year, he was also in charge of Monagas.

In 2003, Cañas led Maracaibo to the Clausura title, but lost the final to Caracas. He subsequently returned to Monagas, and was named Dujković's assistant at the Ghana national team on 29 December 2005.

After the 2006 FIFA World Cup, Cañas returned to his home country and rejoined Monagas for a third spell. He was appointed manager of Mineros for the 2008 campaign, but was sacked in September of that year.

In 2010, after a period at Estrella Roja, Cañas was again named manager of Monagas. He left the club on 7 December 2011, and was presented as manager of Yaracuyanos the following 21 June.

On 11 January 2016, after two years as Rafael Dudamel's assistant at Deportivo Lara, Cañas was named manager of the club. He left on a mutual agreement on 27 July, and took over Zamora on 23 August 2017.

Cañas led Zamora to their title in 2018, but was sacked on 4 October 2019. On 3 September 2020, after nearly one year without a club, he was appointed in charge of former side Portuguesa.

Cañas left Portuguesa on a mutual agreement on 2 August 2022. On 27 January of the following year, he took over Estudiantes de Mérida, but resigned on 30 May.

On 1 April 2024, Cañas returned to Zamora, replacing Enrique Maggiolo.

== Honours ==
Zamora

- Venezuelan Primera División: 2018
