= Ariel Guevara =

Director Técnico

Personal information
- Full name: Ariel Leonardo Guevara
- Date of birth: 19 July 1984 (age 42)
- Place of birth: Lomas de Zamora, Argentina
- Height: 1.82 m (6 ft 0 in)
- Position: Midfielder

Senior career*
Years	Team	Apps	(Gls)
2005–2006	Deportivo Paraguayo	39	(2)
2007	Ferrocarril Midland	11	(0)
2007–2008	San Martín de Burzaco	15	(1)
2008–2010	Claypole	30	(2)
2010–2011	Deportivo Paraguayo	5	(1)
2011–2012	Yupanqui	12	(0)
2012–2013	Lugano	12	(0)
2013–2014	Defensores de La Boca	8	(0)
2014–2015	Victoriano Arenas	24	(0)
2016	Claypole	3	(0)

Managerial career
- 2017: Atlético Atlas (assistant)
- 2017: Almagro (assistant)
- 2018–2019: Temperley (reserves)
- 2020: Nueva Chicago (assistant)
- 2021: Temperley (reserves)
- 2022: Mineros (assistant)
- 2022: ULA
- 2023: Motagua (assistant)
- 2024: Alvarado (assistant)
- 2024: Alvarado (interim)
- * Club domestic league appearances and goals

Ariel Leonardo Guevara (born 19 July 1984) is an Argentine football manager and former player who played as a midfielder.

== Playing career ==
Born in Lomas de Zamora, Buenos Aires, Guevara began his career with Deportivo Paraguayo in 2005. He moved to Ferrocarril Midland in 2007, and subsequently represented San Martín de Burzaco and Claypole before returning to Paraguayo in 2010, suffering a knee injury in August of that year.

In June 2012, after a one-year spell at Yupanqui, Guevara joined Lugano. In June 2013, he agreed to a deal with El Porvenir, but the move fell through in the following month, and he subsequently signed for Defensores de La Boca.

In 2014, Guevara moved to Victoriano Arenas. He returned to Claypole in 2016, but left the club in July of that year, and subsequently retired.

== Managerial career ==
After retiring, Guevara worked as an assistant at Atlético Atlas and Almagro before becoming the manager of Temperley's reserve team in 2018. He left in the following year to become Rodolfo de Paoli's assistant at Nueva Chicago, but returned to his previous role in 2020.

Ahead of the 2022 season, Guevara moved to Venezuela and was named assistant of compatriot Gabriel Martínez Poch at Mineros de Guayana. In May, he replaced Junior Lennin Díaz as manager of ULA, but was sacked in August.

In September 2023, Guevara returned to assistant duties after joining César Vigevani's staff at Motagua in Honduras. He was also an assistant of Mauricio Giganti at Alvarado in the following year, also acting as an interim in April as the manager was out due to a pneumonia.

On 6 September 2024, Guevara returned to Venezuela after being named manager of Angostura, but registration issues prevented him from managing the club; Angostura ultimately announced he would not manage the club on 26 September.
