= Horacio Matuszyczk =

Argentine football manager (born 1961)

Personal information
- Full name: Horacio Ignacio Matuszyczk
- Date of birth: 29 November 1961 (age 64)
- Place of birth: Melincué, Argentina
- Position: Forward

Team information
- Current team: Real Potosí (manager)

Youth career
- Boca Juniors

Senior career*
Years	Team	Apps	(Gls)
1981–1982	Boca Juniors	17	(0)
1983–1985	Racing Club	53	(1)
1986	Defensa y Justicia		
1986–1987	Temperley	13	(1)
1987	Unión Española		
1988–1991	Cobresal		
1991	Deportes La Serena		
1992–1993	Minervén		
1994	Marítimo de Venezuela		

Managerial career
- 2004–2006: Iberoamericano
- 2007: Minervén Bolívar
- 2008: Monagas
- 2009–2011: Angostura
- 2012: Angostura
- 2012–2014: Tucanes de Amazonas
- 2014–2016: Trujillanos
- 2016–2017: Portuguesa
- 2017–2018: Trujillanos
- 2019: Mineros
- 2022–2023: Hermanos Colmenarez
- 2023–: Real Potosí
- * Club domestic league appearances and goals

Horacio Ignacio Matuszyczk (born 29 November 1961) is an Argentine football manager and former player who played as a forward. He is the current manager of Bolivian club Real Potosí.

== Playing career ==
Born in Melincué, Santa Fe Province, Matuszyczk began his career with Boca Juniors, making his first team debut on 11 October 1981, in a 7–1 win over San Lorenzo de Mar del Plata. He left the club in 1982, and subsequently played for Racing Club, Defensa y Justicia and Temperley before moving abroad with Chilean side Unión Española in 1987.

In 1992, after three years at Cobresal and one season at Deportes La Serena, Matuszyczk moved to Venezuela with Minervén. He retired at the country, while playing for Marítimo de Venezuela.

== Managerial career ==
Matuszyczk began his managerial career in 2004, while in charge of Venezuelan side Iberoamericano. Ahead of the 2007–08 season, he became manager of Minervén Bolívar after the club replaced Iberoamericano in the Segunda División.

Matuszyczk left Minervén in September 2007, and was presented as manager of Monagas in March of the following year. In 2009, he took over Angostura FC in the second division, leaving for a short period in late 2011 before returning in March 2012.

In 2012, Matuszyczk replaced Edson Tortolero ahead of Tucanes de Amazonas, freshly relegated from the Primera División. He led the club back to the top tier as champions, and was named manager of fellow first division side Trujillanos on 31 May 2014.

Matuszyczk left Trujillanos on 10 May 2016, and was announced as manager of Portuguesa on 6 June. He was sacked the following 22 February, and returned to Trujillanos on 11 September 2017. He resigned on 23 November 2018, being immediately announced at Mineros de Guayana.

On 16 August 2019, Matuszyczk was sacked by Mineros. He remained nearly three years without coaching before taking over Hermanos Colmenarez on 26 July 2022.

Matuszyczk was sacked by Hermanos Colmenarez on 25 March 2023, after a poor start of the season.

== Honours ==
=== Player ===
Boca Juniors

- Argentine Primera División: 1981

=== Manager ===
Tucanes de Amazonas

- Venezuelan Segunda División: 2012–13
