= Matías Mazmud =

Argentine football manager

Personal information
- Date of birth: 24 November 1976 (age 49)
- Place of birth: Buenos Aires, Argentina

Managerial career
- Years: Team
- 2011–2014: Lamadrid (youth)
- 2015–2016: Poli Santa Brígida
- 2017: Sportivo Unión
- 2019–2020: Juventud Unida de Muñiz (youth)
- 2020: Delfines del Este
- 2021: Atlético Pantoja
- 2022: JJ Urquiza (interim)
- 2023: Mineros de Guayana
- 2024: JJ Urquiza
- 2025: Boca Unidos

Matías Mazmud (born 24 November 1976) is an Argentine football manager.

== Career ==
Born in Buenos Aires, Mazmud began his career with Paraguayan side Club Acosta Ñu in 2011, managing an exchange project of players from his home country to Paraguay. He subsequently worked as a youth manager of General Lamadrid, while also working as a scout for River Plate.

In 2015, Mazmud was named technical coordinator and head coach of the first team of Club Polideportivo Santa Brígida in San Miguel. In 2017, he was in charge of Club Sportivo Unión de San Miguel.

In March 2020, after being in charge of CSyD Juventud Unida de Muñiz's youth team, Mazmud was named manager of Delfines del Este in the Dominican Republic, but ultimately did not manage the club after the season was postponed due to the COVID-19 pandemic. On 3 February 2021, he was announced as Atlético Pantoja manager, but was sacked in May after just five matches.

Mazmud was also a part of JJ Urquiza's staff during the 2022 season, acting as an interim manager for one match. On 24 June 2023, he was named in charge of Venezuelan Primera División side Mineros de Guayana, but was sacked nearly one month later.
