= Iván Fernández (football manager) =

Spanish football manager (born 1978)

Personal information
- Full name: Iván Fernández Álvarez
- Date of birth: 21 October 1978 (age 48)
- Place of birth: Vigo, Spain

Managerial career
- Years: Team
- –2017: Cristo de la Victoria (youth)
- 2015–2016: Atlántida Matamá
- 2016–2017: Ribadelouro
- 2017–2023: Celta (youth)
- 2019: Alondras (assistant)
- 2023–2024: Vizela U23
- 2024–2025: Academia Puerto Cabello

Iván Fernández Álvarez (born 21 October 1978) is a Spanish football manager.

== Career ==
Born in Vigo, Galicia, Fernández began coaching with the youth sides of hometown club Cristo de la Victoria SD. In 2017, after having managerial spells at SCD Atlántida de Matamá and CD Ribadelouro, he joined the structure of RC Celta de Vigo, as a manager of the Alevín B squad.

In July 2019, while still working at Celta's youth sides, Fernández joined Pereira's staff at Tercera División side Alondras CF, being named his assistant. He continued to work with the Alevín squad in the following years, before being appointed manager of the under-23 team of Portuguese side FC Vizela on 5 July 2023.

On 23 July 2024, Fernández left Vizela to take over Venezuelan Primera División side Academia Puerto Cabello, becoming the second Spaniard in the country. On 31 January of the following year, he left by mutual consent.
