= Deportivo Rayo Zuliano =

Venezuelan football club

Rayo Zuliano
- Full name: Deportivo Rayo Zuliano
- Nickname: Azul Amarillo
- Founded: 2005; 21 years ago
- Ground: Estadio José Pachencho Romero
- Capacity: 40,800
- Chairman: Javier Portillo
- Manager: Johanny García
- League: Liga FUTVE
- 2025: Liga FUTVE, 11th of 14
- Website: https://rayozuliano.com/
Home colours	Away colours

Deportivo Rayo Zuliano is a Venezuelan professional football club based in Maracaibo. Founded in 2005, the club play in the Venezuelan Primera División, hosting their home matches at the Estadio José Pachencho Romero.

== History ==
Founded in 2005, Deportivo Rayo Zuliano played in the 2005–06 edition of the Torneo Aspirantes, the third division in the country, before spending a year inactive. The club later entered the inaugural season of the Venezuelan Tercera División, narrowly missing out on promotion to Segunda División B in 2007–08 and then achieving mid-table campaigns in 2008–09 and 2009–10.

In 2010, Rayo Zuliano ceased to play in the Tercera División, and only returned to a professional status in 2021, after merging with Atlético Furrial and being admitted in the year's Segunda División. After an eighth position finish in their group in 2021, the club led their group in 2022, but were knocked out in the promotion phase.

On 12 December 2022, it was announced that Rayo Zuliano would merge with Primera División side Zulia, taking their place in the top tier. The merger was officially confirmed on 28 January 2023. Rayo Zuliano were able to place eighth in their first Primera División campaign, which allowed them to qualify for the 2024 Copa Sudamericana.

== Current squad ==
As of 11 March, 2026 Note: Flags indicate national team as defined under FIFA eligibility rules; some limited exceptions apply. Players may hold more than one non-FIFA nationality.

No.	Pos.	Nation	Player
1	GK	VEN	José Camacoro
2	DF	VEN	Frank Chávez
3	DF	VEN	Daniel Rivillo
4	DF	VEN	Paolo Chacón
5	MF	VEN	Johao Martínez
6	DF	VEN	Andrés Kinsler (on loan from Deportivo La Guaira B)
7	FW	VEN	Deiber Vásquez
8	MF	VEN	Jhan Velez
9	FW	VEN	Cristian Maldonado
10	MF	VEN	Josier Arias
11	MF	VEN	Cristian Romero
12	GK	VEN	Rafael Ramírez
15	MF	VEN	Edwin Palma
17	DF	VEN	Óscar Conde
18	FW	VEN	Luis Enrique Paz
19	FW	VEN	Gilmar Martínez
20	MF	VEN	Edwin Castro

No.	Pos.	Nation	Player
21	MF	VEN	Daniel Franco
22	DF	VEN	Samuel Orejuela
23	FW	VEN	Jose Luis Ochoa
24	FW	VEN	Bryan Duarte (on loan from Deportivo La Guaira U20)
25	DF	VEN	Jaider Julio
26	MF	VEN	Jorge Luis Gómez
31	DF	VEN	Oscar García
32	DF	VEN	Albert Barboza
33	FW	VEN	Jesús Blois
34	DF	VEN	Fernando Diaz
36	DF	VEN	Angel Jimenez
40	GK	VEN	Jeremías Medina
70	MF	VEN	Junior Colina
90	FW	VEN	Lewuis Peña
97	MF	VEN	Luis Urbina
99	FW	VEN	Maiken González (on loan from Deportivo La Guaira)

== Managers ==
- (Colombia) Alex García King (2021–22)
- (Venezuela) Elvis Martínez (2023–24)
- (Venezuela) Javier Villafráz (2024–25)
- (Venezuela) Johanny García (2025–)
