= Saúl Maldonado =

Uruguayan football manager (born 1961)

Personal information
- Full name: Saúl Blas Maldonado
- Date of birth: 2 July 1961 (age 65)
- Place of birth: Montevideo, Uruguay
- Position: Defender

Youth career
- Deportivo Oriental

Senior career*
Years	Team	Apps	(Gls)
1983–1985	Deportivo Portugués		
1985–1989	Marítimo de Venezuela		
1989–1992	Caracas		
1992–1993	Estudiantes de Mérida		
1993–1994	Deportivo Italia		
1994–1997	Caracas		

Managerial career
- 1998–1999: Loyola (youth)
- 2000–2002: Caracas (assistant)
- 2005–2006: Italmaracaibo
- 2007–2008: Estrella Roja
- 2009–2010: Carabobo
- 2010–2012: Yaracuyanos
- 2013: Monagas
- 2013–2014: Deportivo Petare
- 2015: Tucanes de Amazonas
- 2016: Deportivo Táchira (assistant)
- 2017–2018: Zulia (assistant)
- 2018–2020: Tauro
- 2020–2021: Panama U20
- 2020–2021: Panama (assistant)
- 2021: Sporting San Miguelito
- 2023: Plaza Amador
- 2024: Angostura
- * Club domestic league appearances and goals

Saúl Blas Maldonado (born 2 July 1961) is a Uruguayan football manager and former player who played as a midfielder.

== Club career ==
Born in Montevideo, Maldonado played amateur football in his home country before moving to Venezuela in 1983 with Deportivo Portugués. In 1985, after the club's dissolution, he moved to Marítimo de Venezuela.

Maldonado subsequently represented Caracas and had short spells at Estudiantes de Mérida and Deportivo Italia before returning to the club. He retired in 1997.

== International career ==
After obtaining Venezuelan nationality, Maldonado was in the provisional list for the 1991 Copa América, but was cut from the final squad.

== Managerial career ==
After retiring, Maldonado was a youth coach at Loyola and an assistant at Caracas before becoming a coordinator at Centro Cultural Hebraica. His first managerial experience occurred in 2005, at Italmaracaibo.

Maldonado subsequently managed Estrella Roja, Carabobo, Yaracuyanos, Monagas, Deportivo Petare and Tucanes de Amazonas before joining his brother's staff at Deportivo Táchira in January 2016. He was also his assistant at Zulia, before returning to managerial duties on 11 September 2018, after being named at the helm of Tauro in Panama.

On 15 August 2020, Maldonado was appointed manager of the Panama national under-20 team, while also being an assistant of Thomas Christiansen in the full side. On 11 April 2021, he took over Sporting San Miguelito, but left the club in November.

On 2 December 2022, after more than a year without a club, Maldonado returned to Panama after being named Plaza Amador manager. He resigned the following 17 April.

After spending a period working in the Venezuelan Football Federation, Maldonado was appointed in charge of Angostura on 26 September 2024.

== Personal life ==
Maldonado's younger brother Carlos and nephew Giancarlo were also footballers. The former played as a midfielder, while the latter was a forward, and both later became managers. His son Javier is also a defender.

== Honours ==
Tauro

- Liga Panameña de Fútbol: 2018 Apertura, 2019 Apertura
