= Alex García King =

Colombian footballer and manager (born 1959)

Personal information
- Full name: Alex Alberto García King
- Date of birth: 8 January 1959 (age 67)
- Place of birth: Santa Marta, Colombia
- Height: 1.87 m (6 ft 2 in)
- Position: Goalkeeper

Team information
- Current team: Deportivo Rayo Zuliano (sporting director)

Senior career*
Years	Team	Apps	(Gls)
- Unión Magdalena
- Santa Fe

Managerial career
- 1988–1996: Mineros de Guayana (assistant)
- 1997: Mineros de Guayana
- 1998–1999: Nueva Cádiz (assistant)
- 1999–2001: Zulianos (assistant)
- 2001–2010: Maracaibo (youth)
- 2001: Maracaibo (interim)
- 2010–2011: Maracaibo
- 2011–2012: Zulia
- 2013–2016: Atlético Falcón
- 2017–2019: Zulia (youth)
- 2019: Zulia (interim)
- 2020: Zulia
- 2021: Titanes
- 2021–2022: Deportivo Rayo Zuliano
- * Club domestic league appearances and goals

Alex Alberto García King (born 8 January 1959) is a Colombian football manager and former player who played as a goalkeeper. He is the current sporting director of Venezuelan club Deportivo Rayo Zuliano.

== Career ==
After playing as a goalkeeper for Unión Magdalena and Independiente Santa Fe, García King became an assistant manager at Venezuelan club Mineros de Guayana. Ahead of the 1997 season, he became the manager of their first team, being in charge of the club's second-ever run in the Copa Libertadores.

After subsequently working as an assistant at Nueva Cádiz and Zulianos, García King joined Maracaibo in 2001, as a manager of the youth categories. An interim in that year, he only took over the main squad in Segunda División on 22 June 2010.

García King left Maracaibo in 2011 after the club's dissolution, and was appointed at the helm of Zulia on 18 May of that year. He was sacked in February 2013, and was named manager of second division side Atlético Falcón in June.

García King returned to Zulia in 2017, as manager of the youth sides, and became an interim on 14 September 2019. He returned to his previous role after the appointment of Alexander Rondón, but replaced Rondón as manager on 3 January 2020.

After leaving Zulia ahead of the 2020 campaign, García King worked as manager of second division sides Titanes and Deportivo Rayo Zuliano, leading the latter to a first-ever promotion to the top tier. After the promotion, he changed roles at the latter club.

== Personal life ==
García King is the brother of Radamel García, former central defender and manager, and is the uncle of international forward Radamel Falcao. His other brother, Herbert King, was an actor.
