= Enrique Maggiolo =

Venezuelan football manager

Personal information
- Full name: Enrique Ricardo Maggiolo Díaz
- Date of birth: 16 September 1974 (age 52)
- Place of birth: Caracas, Venezuela

Managerial career
- Years: Team
- La Salle La Colina
- 1998–2005: San Agustín El Paraíso
- 2005–2007: Estrella Roja
- 2014–2017: Atlético Venezuela (youth)
- 2017–2019: Atlético Venezuela B
- 2019–2021: Deportivo Petare
- 2021: Carabobo
- 2022: Universidad Central
- 2022: Carabobo
- 2023–2024: Zamora

Enrique Ricardo Maggiolo Díaz (born 16 September 1974) is a Venezuelan football manager.

== Career ==
Born in Caracas, Maggiolo started his career at Colegio La Salle La Colina before joining C.S. Colegio San Agustín El Paraíso in 1998. In March 2005, he was in charge of Segunda División side Estrella Roja, before leaving in December 2007.

In 2014, Maggiolo joined Atlético Venezuela as their under-18 manager. On 17 January 2017, he was named at the helm of the club's reserve team also in the second division.

In 2019, Maggiolo was appointed Deportivo Petare manager, and renewed his contract for a further campaign on 12 December of that year. On 14 February 2021, he was presented as manager of Primera División side Carabobo.

Maggiolo left Carabobo in December 2021, after his contract expired, and was named at the helm of Universidad Central also in the top tier on 6 May 2022. He resigned from the latter on 16 August, and returned to Carabobo on 7 October.

On 1 August 2023, Maggiolo was appointed Zamora manager. He departed the club the following 1 April, after five winless matches into the 2024 season.
