= Angostura F.C. =

Venezuelan football club

Angostura
- Full name: Angostura Fútbol Club
- Nickname(s): Torbellino Auriazul (Yellow-Blue Whirlwind)
- Founded: 1 December 2007; 17 years ago
- Ground: Estadio Ricardo Tulio Maya
- Capacity: 2,500
- Chairman: Michelle Soriente
- Manager: Vacant
- League: Segunda División
- 2024: Primera División, 12th of 14 (relegated)
Home colours	Away colours

Angostura Fútbol Club is a Venezuelan professional football club based in Ciudad Bolívar. Founded in 2007, they play in the Venezuelan Segunda División.

== History ==
Founded on 1 December 2007 and named after the former name of Ciudad Bolívar as well as the Angostura Bridge that crosses the Orinoco river at this point, the club started to play in the Oriental Group of the Tercera División championship in the 2008–09 season, making its debut in the competition on 27 September 2008 with a 2–2 draw against Atlético El Callao. Angostura ended in last place in their group in the Apertura tournament after collecting three draws and three losses, and although their performance improved in the Clausura tournament with four wins and two draws, they ended tied in points with Inter Anzoátegui and were unable to advance to the final stage of the tournament, missing out on goal difference.

Angostura were promoted to Segunda División for the 2009–10 season due to the administrative relegation of Minervén. In their first campaign in the second tier, they ended in 13th place in the Apertura tournament and third in the Clausura. The following season, they won the Centro-Oriental Group in the Clausura tournament, allowing them to advance to the Final group in which they ended in bottom place. And in the 2011–12 season, Angostura advanced to the promotion stage, but ended up missing out on promotion by two points.

In 2013 Angostura temporarily moved to Maturín, returning to their hometown for the 2014–15 campaign, in which they ended in sixth place of their group and had to play the Torneo de Promoción y Permanencia in order to avoid relegation, which they managed to do by ending in first place. Angostura had a poor performance in the subsequent 2015 Adecuación tournament, finishing in last place of both their first stage and relegation tournament groups with a total of two wins in the competition. However they ended up avoiding relegation due to a restructuring of the league system.

In 2017, Angostura ended the first stage of the tournament in second place with 45 points but placed third-from-bottom in the final stage with 13 points, performance which was bettered in 2019. In that season they ended on top of both the Apertura and Clausura tournaments but were eliminated in the knockout stages, losing to Gran Valencia in the Apertura semifinals and Universidad Central in the Clausura quarterfinals.

In 2020 and 2021, they failed to advance to the final stages, while in the 2022 season Angostura ended in fourth place of the Centro-Occidental Group with 27 points, advancing to the following stage of the competition which they topped with 12 points and four wins. After beating Atlético La Cruz on penalties in the semifinals, Angostura defeated Academia Anzoátegui in the finals with a 4–2 aggregate score to win their first Segunda División title and achieve promotion to Primera División.

Angostura managed to stay in Primera División for two seasons, reaching the Apertura semi-finals in 2024. Following the end of the 2024 season, it was reported that Angostura were negotiating a merger with Segunda División side Anzoátegui, with which the latter club would take Angostura's place in Primera División. On 14 January 2025, the Liga FUTVE stated that Anzoátegui would replace Angostura in the tournament, while Angostura would play in Segunda División as a result of this arrangement. Four days later, the Venezuelan Football Federation confirmed that Angostura had failed to comply with the financial requirements for a license to compete in the top tier, being relegated as a result.

== Honours ==
- Venezuelan Segunda División: 1

2022

== Managers ==
- (Argentina) Horacio Matuszyczk (2009–11)
- (Venezuela) Aldo R. Rampini (2011–12)
- (Venezuela) Luis Vera (2012)
- (Argentina) Horacio Matuszyczk (2012)
- (Venezuela) Hugo Mujica (2012–13)
- (Venezuela) Gilberto Angelucci (2013–14)
- (Venezuela) José Luis Ciccarelli (2014–15)
- (Venezuela) José David Rebolledo (2016)
- (Venezuela) Luis Vera (2016)
- (Venezuela) Yoimer Segovia (2017)
- (Venezuela) José Luis Danglad (2017)
- (Venezuela) Luis Vera (2018–20)
- (Venezuela) José Luis Ciccarelli (2021–22)
- (Venezuela) Osmar Castillo (2022–24)
- (Venezuela) Adrián Sánchez (caretaker, 2024)
- (Uruguay) Saúl Maldonado (2024)
