= Elvis Martínez (footballer) =

Venezuelan footballer (born 1970)

Personal information
- Full name: Elvis Alfonso Martínez Dugarte
- Date of birth: 4 October 1970 (age 56)
- Place of birth: Mérida, Venezuela
- Height: 1.82 m (5 ft 11 1/2 in)
- Position: Defender

Senior career*
Years	Team	Apps	(Gls)
1991–1993	Universidad Los Andes		
1993–1994	Celta Turista	5	(0)
1994–1997	Caracas		
1998–2000	Universidad Los Andes		
2000–2001	Deportivo Táchira		
2001–2003	Estudiantes de Mérida		
2003–2008	Unión Maracaibo		
2007–2010	Estudiantes de Mérida		
2010–2012	Deportivo Lara		
2012–2014	Estudiantes de Mérida		

International career
1993–2002	Venezuela	33	(0)

Managerial career
- 2016–2018: Estudiantes de Mérida (assistant)
- 2018–2020: Universidad Los Andes
- 2021: Titanes
- 2022: Bolívar SC
- 2023–2024: Deportivo Rayo Zuliano
- * Club domestic league appearances and goals

Elvis Alfonso Martínez Dugarte (born 4 October 1970 in Mérida) is a Venezuelan football manager and former player who played as a defender.

Martínez made a total number of 33 appearances for the Venezuela national team between 1993 and 2002. He started his professional career at Universidad Los Andes.
