= 2011 Club Bolívar season =

Club Bolívar
2011 season
- Chairman: (Bolivia) Guido Loayza & Marcelo Claure
- Manager: (Argentina) Guillermo Ángel Hoyos
- Torneo Adecuación: 5th
- Top goalscorer: (Brazil) Zé Carlos (4 goals)

The 2011 season is Bolívar's 34th consecutive season in the Liga de Fútbol Profesional Boliviano, and 85th year in existence as a football club. To see more news about Bolivar see Bolivar Official Website

== Current squad ==
For Liga de Fútbol Profesional Boliviano 2011 Note: Flags indicate national team as defined under FIFA eligibility rules; some limited exceptions apply. Players may hold more than one non-FIFA nationality.

No.	Pos.	Nation	Player
1	GK	BOL	Romel Quiñones
2	DF	BOL	Edemir Rodríguez
3	MF	BOL	Gabriel Valverde
4	DF	BOL	Lorgio Alvarez
4	FW	BOL	Walter Bowles
5	DF	BOL	Ronald Rivero (red card)
6	DF	ARG	Pablo Frontini
7	MF	BOL	Abdon Reyes
7	MF	BOL	Roger Rico
8	MF	BOL	Ronald Garcia (captain)
9	FW	BRA	Zé Carlos
10	FW	BOL	Rudy Cardozo
11	MF	ARG	Damián Lizio
12	MF	BOL	Jhon Carinao
13	GK	ARG	Marcos Arguello

No.	Pos.	Nation	Player
14	MF	BOL	Carlos Kassab
15	GK	BOL	Diego Zamora
16	MF	BRA	José Marcelo Gomes
17	DF	BOL	Enrique Bustillos
18	MF	BOL	Wálter Flores (captain)
19	MF	BOL	Diego Rivero
20	DF	BOL	Abraham Cabrera
21	FW	BOL	Rodrigo Vargas
22	MF	BOL	Ronald Eguino
23	MF	BOL	Álex da Rosa
25	MF	BOL	Damir Miranda (red card)
28	FW	URU	William Ferreira
29	MF	BOL	Jorge Cuellar
—	DF	BOL	Alejandro Mendez

=== First team squad ===
The squad will be announced on February 1st

No.	Name	Nationality	Position (s)	Date of birth (age)	Height	Signed from
Goalkeepers
1	Marcos Arguello	(Argentina)	GK	July 28, 1981 (age 45)	1.89 m (6 ft 2 1/2 in)	(Argentina) Chacarita Juniors
	Romel Quiñones	(Bolivia)	GK	June 25, 1992 (age 34)		(Bolivia) Academia Tahuichi Aguilera
	Diego Zamora	(Bolivia)	GK	September 12, 1993 (age 33)		(Bolivia) Club Bolívar
Defenders
5	Pablo Frontini	(Argentina)	CB	May 3, 1984 (age 42)	1.83 m (6 ft 0 in)	(Argentina) River Plate
	Ronald Rivero	(Bolivia)	CB	January 29, 1980 (age 46)		(Bolivia) Universitario
	Alejandro Mendez	(Bolivia)	CB	January 11, 1991 (age 35)		(Bolivia) Academia Tahuichi Aguilera
	Edemir Rodríguez	(Bolivia)	CB / RB	October 21, 1986 (age 40)	1.75 m (5 ft 9 in)	(Bolivia) Real Potosí
	Enrique Bustillos	(Bolivia)	RB	March 29, 1988 (age 38)		(Bolivia) Club Bolívar
	Ronald Eguino	(Bolivia)	RB	February 20, 1988 (age 38)		(Bolivia) Real Potosí
	Lorgio Alvarez	(Bolivia)	LB	June 29, 1978 (age 48)	1.79 m (5 ft 10 1/2 in)	(Bolivia) Club Blooming
	Abraham Cabrera	(Bolivia)	LB	August 25, 1989 (age 37)		(Bolivia) Club Bolívar
Midfielders
	Wálter Flores	(Bolivia)	DM	October 29, 1978 (age 48)	1.72 m (5 ft 7 1/2 in)	(Bolivia) Club Bolívar
	Ronald García	(Bolivia)	CM	December 17, 1980 (age 45)	1.84 m (6 ft 1/2 in)	(Bolivia) Club Bolívar
	Damir Miranda	(Bolivia)	DM	October 6, 1985 (age 41)		(Bolivia) Club Destroyers
	Gabriel Valverde	(Bolivia)	DM	June 24, 1990 (age 36)		(Bolivia) Club Bolívar
	Rudy Cardozo	(Bolivia)	AM	February 14, 1990 (age 36)		(Bolivia) Academia Tahuichi Aguilera
	José Marcelo Gomes	(Brazil)	AM	November 24, 1981 (age 44)		(Bolivia) Universitario
	Álex da Rosa	(Bolivia)	AM	June 1, 1976 (age 50)	1.72 m (5 ft 7 1/2 in)	(Brazil) Caxias
	Abdon Reyes	(Bolivia)	AM	November 7, 1981 (age 45)	1.70 m (5 ft 7 in)	(Bolivia) Club Bolívar
	Diego Rivero	(Bolivia)	AM	June 16, 1991 (age 35)		(Bolivia) Blooming
	Carlos Kassab	(Bolivia)	AM	March 9, 1991 (age 35)		(Bolivia) Club Bolívar
	Jhon Carinao	(Bolivia)	CM	September 13, 1991 (age 35)		(Bolivia) Club Bolívar
	Damián Lizio	(Argentina)	AM	June 30, 1989 (age 37)	1.68 m (5 ft 6 in)	(Argentina) River Plate
Forwards
	Rodrigo Vargas	(Bolivia)	CF	September 1, 1989 (age 37)		(Bolivia) Club Bolívar
	Walter Bowles	(Bolivia)	CF	April 22, 1989 (age 37)		(Bolivia) Blooming
	Zé Carlos	(Bolivia)	CF	March 19, 1975 (age 51)	1.75 m (5 ft 9 in)	(Brazil) Goianiense

=== Top scorers ===
Includes all competitive matches. The list is sorted by shirt number when total goals are equal.

Last updated on 1 March

Position	Nation	Number	Name	Adecuación Goals	Apertura Goals	Copa Libertadores Goals	Copa Aerosur Goals	Total Goals
1	(Brazil)	9	Zé Carlos	5	0	0	0	5
2	(Bolivia)	25	Damir Miranda	3	0	0	0	3
3	(Uruguay)	28	William Ferreira	2	0	0	0	2
4	(Bolivia)	6	Pablo Frontini	1	0	0	0	1
5	(Bolivia)	4	Lorgio Alvarez	1	0	0	0	1
6	(Brazil)	16	José Marcelo Gomes	1	0	0	0	1
7	(Bolivia)	5	Ronald Rivero	1	0	0	0	1
8	(Bolivia)	19	Diego Rivero	1	0	0	0	1
9	(Bolivia)	2	Edemir Rodríguez	1	0	0	0	1
			TOTALS	16	0	0	0	16

=== Disciplinary record ===
Includes all competitive matches. Players with 1 card or more included only.

Last updated on 23 February 2011

Position	Nation	Number	Name	Torneo Adecuacion		Copa Libertadores		Total	
Position	Nation	Number	Name	Yellow card	Red card	Yellow card	Red card	Yellow card	Red card
1	(Bolivia)	18	Wálter Flores	5	0	1	0	6	0
2	(Bolivia)	4	Lorgio Alvarez	5	0	0	0	5	0
3	(Argentina)	6	Pablo Frontini	4	1	0	0	4	1
4	(Bolivia)	5	Ronald Rivero	3	0	1	0	4	0
5	(Bolivia)	2	Edemir Rodríguez	3	0	0	0	3	0
6	(Argentina)	13	Marcos Arguello	3	0	0	0	3	0
7	(Brazil)	9	Zé Carlos	2	0	0	1	2	1
8	(Bolivia)	10	Rudy Cardozo	2	1	0	0	2	1
9	(Bolivia)	22	Ronald Eguino	2	0	1	0	3	0
10	(Bolivia)	8	Ronald García	1	2	0	1	1	3
11	(Bolivia)	19	Diego Rivero	1	0	0	0	1	0
12	(Bolivia)	12	Jhon Carinao	1	0	0	0	1	0
13	(Bolivia)	14	Walter Bowles	1	0	0	0	1	0
14	(Bolivia)	16	Carlos Kassab	1	0	0	0	1	0
15	(Bolivia)	25	Damir Miranda	1	0	0	0	1	0
16	(Uruguay)	28	William Ferreira	1	0	0	0	1	0
17	(Bolivia)	29	Jorge I. Cuellar	1	0	0	0	1	0
18	(Bolivia)	11	Damian Lizio	1	0	0	0	1	0
19	(Bolivia)	25	Alex da Rosa	0	0	1	0	1	0
			TOTALS	38	4	4	2	42	8

=== Appearances ===
Includes all competitive matches. The list is sorted by shirt number when total appearances are equal.

Last updated on 1 March

Position	Nation	Number	Name	Torneo Adecuacion		Copa Libertadores		Total	
Position	Nation	Number	Name	Minuted played	Appearances	Minuted played	Appearances	Minuted played	Appearances
1	(Argentina)	13	Marcos Arguello	540	6	180	2	720	8
1	(Bolivia)	18	Walter Flores	720	8	0	0	720	8
1	(Bolivia)	5	Ronald Rivero	720	8	0	0	720	8
1	(Bolivia)	4	Lorgio Alvarez	713	8	0	0	713	8
1	(Argentina)	6	Pablo Frontini	551	7	0	0	551	7
			TOTALS	0	0	0	0	7	

=== Copa Libertadores ===
==== First stage ====
January 27, 2011
21:12 (UTC−4)

Bolívar (Bolivia)	0 – 1	(Chile) Unión Española
Ronald Rivero (yellow card) 47'; Zé Carlos (yellow card) 50'; Zé Carlos (yellow card) 80' (red card); Ronald Eguino (yellow card) 89'		Fernando Cordero 17'; Rainer Wirth (yellow card) 38'; Gonzalo Villagra (yellow card) 52'

Estadio Hernando Siles, La Paz
Attendance: 30,000
Referee: Víctor Rivera (Perú)
March 23, 2010
19:30 (UTC−3)

Unión Española (Chile)	0 – 0	(Bolivia) Bolívar
Rodolfo Alejandro Madrid (yellow card) 55'; Raúl Enrique Estévez (yellow card) 72'		Ronald García (yellow card) 9'; Alex Da Rosa (yellow card) 29'; Ronald García (red card) 66'; Walter Flores (yellow card) 84'

Estadio Santa Laura, Santiago
Attendance: 20,000
Referee: Carlos Amarilla (Paraguay)

=== Torneo Apertura ===
Pos	Team	Pld	W	D	L	GF	GA	GD	Pts	Qualification
1	Bolívar	22	11	7	4	32	24	+8	40	2012 Copa Libertadores Second Stage
2	Real Potosí	22	11	5	6	32	22	+10	38	2012 Copa Libertadores First Stage
3	Oriente Petrolero	22	11	3	8	46	25	+21	36	2012 Copa Sudamericana First Stage
4	The Strongest	22	10	5	7	33	26	+7	35	
5	Blooming	22	11	2	9	34	28	+6	35	

Rules for classification: 1st points; 2nd goal difference; 3rd number of goals scored.

=== Results summary ===
Overall								Home						Away					
Pld	W	D	L	GF	GA	GD	Pts	W	D	L	GF	GA	GD	W	D	L	GF	GA	GD
10	5	3	2	13	13	0	18	3	2	0	8	3	+5	2	1	2	5	10	−5

Last updated: 1 February 2011.
Source: Torneo Adecuacion

=== Results by round ===
Round	1	2	3	4	5	6	7	8	9	10	11	12	13	14	15	16	17	18	19	20	21	22
Ground	H	A	H	A	H	A	H	H	A	A	A	A	H	A	H	A	H	A	A	H	H	H
Result	W	D	W	L	D	W	D	W	L	W												
Position	2	2	2	2	2	2	2	2	3	2												

Updated to match(es) played on 13 April. Source: Matches
A = Away; H = Home; W = Win; D = Draw; L = Loss

=== Matches ===
16 January 2011
15:30

Bolívar	3– 0	Real Potosí
Rudy Cardozo (yellow card) 42'; Zé Carlos (yellow card) 52' (goal) 60'; Lorgio Alvarez (yellow card) 57'; Ronald Rivero 67'; Damir Miranda (yellow card) 85'; José Marcelo Gomes 89'		Diego Salvatierra (yellow card) 41'; Ariel Juarez (yellow card) 52'; Miguel Loayza (yellow card) 57'; Eduardo Ortiz (yellow card) 71'

Estadio Hernando Siles, La Paz
Attendance: 23,000
Referee: Jose Jordan

23 January 2011
16:00

The Strongest	0 – 0	Club Bolívar
Federico Garcia (yellow card) 6'; Leonel Reyes (yellow card) 13'; Sacha Lima (yellow card) 45'; Enrique Parada (yellow card) 55'; Enrique Parada (yellow card) 61' (red card); Luis H. Melgar (yellow card) 75'; Federico García (yellow card) 89' (red card)		Ronald Garcia (yellow card) 7'; Edemir Rodríguez (yellow card) 21'; Pablo Frontini (yellow card) 29'; Walter Flores (yellow card) 42'; Ronald Garcia (yellow card) 38' (red card); William Ferreira (yellow card) 72'

Estadio Hernando Siles, La Paz
Attendance: 40,000
Referee: Oscar Maldonado

30 January 2011
16:00

Club Bolívar	1 – 0	Club Blooming
José Carlos Santos da Silva 20'		Marcos Andia (yellow card) 47'; Dustin Maldonado (yellow card) 53'; Gómez (yellow card) 65'

Estadio Hernando Siles, La Paz
Attendance: 20,000
Referee: Gery Vargas

6 February 2011
15:30

San José	3 – 2	Club Bolívar
Luis Carlos Vieira 33'; Limbert Pizarro (yellow card) 38'; Juaquin Botero 43'; Juaquin Botero 49'; Bruno Juarez (yellow card) 52'; Nicolas Suarez (yellow card) 77'		Zé Carlos 12'; Lorgio Alvarez (yellow card) 17'; Zé Carlos (yellow card) 38'; Pablo Frontini (yellow card) 47'; Ronald Rivero (yellow card) 50'; Damir Miranda 51'; Walter Flores (yellow card) 58'; Carlos Kassab (yellow card) 90'

Estadio Jesús Bermúdez, Oruro, Bolivia
Attendance: 30,000
Referee: Jorge Joaquin Antequera

12 February 2011
16:00

Club Bolívar	1 – 1	Club Aurora
Diego Rivero (yellow card) 11'; Zé Carlos 39'		Jair Reinoso 13'; Darwin Peña (yellow card) 22'; Diomenes Peña (yellow card) 25'; Aquilino Villalba (yellow card) 30'; Augusto Andaveris (yellow card) 62'; Jaime Robles (yellow card) 67'; Ivna Huayhuata (yellow card) 68'

Estadio Hernando Siles, La Paz
Attendance: 12,000
Referee: Juan Nelio Garcia

20 February 2011
16:00

Club Universitario	0 – 1	Club Bolívar
Edgar Olivares (yellow card) 49'; Oscar Añez (yellow card) 69'; Walter Flores (yellow card) 28'; Luis Liendo (yellow card) 70'; Edgar Olivares (yellow card) 83' (red card)		Walter Flores (yellow card) 28'; Damir Miranda 33'; Walter Bowles (yellow card) 85'

Estadio Olímpico Patria, Sucre, Bolivia
Attendance: 25,000
Referee: Raul Orozco

24 February 2011
20:00

Club Bolívar	0 – 0	Nacional Potosí
Pablo Frontini (red card) 11'; Marcos Arguello (yellow card) 54'; Lorgio Alvarez (yellow card) 56'; Ronald Garcia (yellow card) 59'		Santos Amador (yellow card) 41' jhosimar Prado (yellow card) 54'; Ronald Puma (yellow card) 54'; Miguel Angel Hurtado (yellow card) 90'; Didi Torrico (yellow card) 92'

Estadio Hernando Siles, La Paz
Attendance: 15,000
Referee: Gery Vargas

27 February 2011
16:00

Club Bolívar	3 – 2	Guabira
Jhon Carinao (yellow card) 17'; Damir Miranda (yellow card) 27'; Ronald Rivero (yellow card) 37'; Lorgio Alvarez (yellow card) 43'; Diego Rivero 61'; Lorgio Alvarez 63'; Marcos Arguello (yellow card) 43'; Edemir Rodríguez 83'		Daner Pachi 25'; Carlos Camacho (yellow card) 56'; Adrian Cuellar (yellow card) 56'; Leandro Martinez (yellow card) 65'; Cristhian Coimbra 70'; Doile Vaca (yellow card) 80'

Estadio Hernando Siles, La Paz
Attendance: 15,000
Referee: Jose Jordan

13 March 2011
18:00

Oriente Petrolero	6 – 0	Club Bolívar
Mauricio Saucedo 15'; Mauricio Saucedo 24'; Marcelo Aguirre (yellow card) 27'; Mauricio Saucedo 33'; Juan Carlos Arce (yellow card) 37'; Mauricio Saucedo 52'; Joselito Vaca 54'; Alcides Peña 61'; Jhasmani Campos (yellow card) 70'; Gustavo Caamaño 76'		Ronald Garcia (yellow card) 1'; Ronald Garcia (yellow card) 20' (red card); Walter Flores (yellow card) 37'; Edemir Rodríguez (yellow card) 48'; Pablo Frontini (yellow card) 77'

Estadio Ramón Tahuichi Aguilera, Santa Cruz, Bolivia
Attendance: 30,000
Referee: Alejandro Mancilla

19 March 2011
16:00

Real Mamoré	1 – 2	Club Bolívar
Juan Maraude 27'; Frank Oni (yellow card) 31'; Adhemar Arias (yellow card) 38'; Guillermo Santo (yellow card) 45'; Yino Quiroz (yellow card) 53'; Adhemar Arias (yellow card) 76' (red card); Jorge Bruno (yellow card) 89'; Jorge Bruno (red card) 92'		Ronald Rivero (yellow card) 12'; Lorgio Alvarez (yellow card) 25'; Zé Carlos 36'; Damián Lizio (yellow card) 44'; Pablo Frontini (yellow card) 47'; Ronald Eguino (yellow card) 56'; Rudy Cardozo (yellow card) 56'; Rudy Cardozo (yellow card) 64' (red card); Walter Flores (yellow card) 65'; Edemir Rodríguez (yellow card) 85'; Pablo Frontini 87'; Marcos Arguello (yellow card) 90'; Jorge I. Cuellar (yellow card) 90'

Estadio Gran Mamoré, Trinidad, Bolivia
Attendance: 30,000
Referee: Alejandro Mancilla

3 April 2011
14:00

La Paz F.C.	2-3	Club Bolívar
Gary Paz (yellow card) 4'; Jorge Florentín 32'; Gary Paz 63'; Rolando Campos (yellow card) 89'; Richar Rojas (yellow card) 90'; Cristian Osorio (yellow card) 90+3'		William Ferreira 20'; Diego Rivero (yellow card) 25'; Gabriel Valverde (yellow card) 25'; Marcos Arguello (red card) 63'; Damir Miranda 64'; Ronald Rivero (yellow card) 72'; Damir Miranda (red card) 88'; William Ferreira 90+1'; Ronald Rivero (red card) 90+3'

Estadio Hernando Siles, La Paz
Attendance: 10,000
Referee: Juan Nelio Garcia
