= 2011–12 Club Bolívar season =

Club Bolívar
2011–2012 season
- Chairman: (Bolivia) Guido Loayza & Marcelo Claure
- Manager: (Argentina) Guillermo Ángel Hoyos
- Torneo Apertura: 5th
- Top goalscorer: (Uruguay) William Ferreira (6 goals)

The 2011-12 season was Bolívar's 35th competitive season in the Liga de Fútbol Profesional Boliviano, and 87th year in existence as a football club.

== Squad ==
For Liga de Fútbol Profesional Boliviano 2011 Note: Flags indicate national team as defined under FIFA eligibility rules; some limited exceptions apply. Players may hold more than one non-FIFA nationality.

No.	Pos.	Nation	Player
1	GK	BOL	Romel Quiñones
2	DF	BOL	Edemir Rodríguez
3	MF	BOL	Gabriel Valverde
4	DF	BOL	Lorgio Alvarez
6	DF	ARG	Pablo Frontini
7	MF	BOL	Abdon Reyes
8	MF	BOL	Ronald Rea
9	FW	COL	John Córdoba
10	MF	BOL	Rudy Cardozo
11	MF	ARG	Damián Lizio
12	MF	BOL	Jhon Carinao
13	GK	ARG	Marcos Arguello
14	MF	BOL	Carlos Kassab
15	GK	BOL	Diego Zamora
16	MF	BOL	Wálter Flores (captain)
17	DF	BOL	Enrique Bustillos
18	FW	BOL	José Alfredo Castillo

No.	Pos.	Nation	Player
19	MF	BOL	Diego Rivero
20	DF	BOL	Abraham Cabrera
21	FW	BOL	Rodrigo Vargas
22	DF	BOL	Ronald Eguino
23	MF	BOL	Leonel Justiniano
24	DF	BOL	Ariel Ribera
25	MF	BOL	Damir Miranda
27	MF	BOL	Jhasmani Campos
28	FW	URU	William Ferreira
29	MF	BOL	Alberto Espindola
32	MF	BOL	Juan Carlos Zampiery
34	MF	BOL	Jeison Siquita Toledo
—	DF	BOL	Jorge Cuellar
—	FW	BOL	Walter Bowles
—	MF	BOL	Roger Rico
—	DF	BOL	Alejandro Mendez

=== Transfers in ===
N	P	Nat.	Player	Age	Moving from	Type	Ends	Transfer fee
27	MF	(Bolivia)	Jhasmani Campos	22	Oriente Petrolero (Bolivia)	transfer	2015	$300.000
11	MF	(Argentina)	Damián Lizio	22	River Plate (Argentina)	transfer	2015	$500.000
9	DF	(Colombia)	John Córdoba	24	Deportivo Petare (Venezuela)	transfer	2012	free
18	MF	(Bolivia)	José Alfredo Castillo	28	Estudiantes Tecos (Mexico)	transfer	2012	free
	MF	(Bolivia)	Ronald Rea	22	Oriente Petrolero (Bolivia)	transfer	2012	free
	DF	(Bolivia)	Ariel Ribera	25	Oriente Petrolero (Bolivia)	transfer	2012	free
32	DF	(Bolivia)	Juan Carlos Zampiery	21	La Paz Futbol Club (Bolivia)	transfer	2012	$?

=== Transfers out ===
N	P	Nat.	Player	Age	Moving to	Type	Transfer fee
5	DF	(Bolivia)	Ronald Rivero	31	Shenzhen Ruby F.C. (China)	transfer	$?
8	FW	(Bolivia)	Ronald García	30	Anorthosis Famagusta (Cyprus)	Loan out	
9	FW	(Brazil)	Zé Carlos	36	?	Contract termination	
16	FW	(Brazil)	José Marcelo Gomes	29	Universitario de Sucre (Bolivia)	transfer	free
23	FW	(Bolivia)	Álex da Rosa	35	Nacional Potosí (Bolivia)	transfer	free
	FW	(Colombia)	Juan Camilo Ríos	23	Petrolero de Yacuiba (Bolivia)	Loan	free

=== First team squad ===
The squad will be announced on September 1st

No.	Name	Nationality	Position (s)	Date of birth (age)	Height	Signed from
Goalkeepers
1	Marcos Arguello	(Argentina)	GK	July 28, 1981 (age 45)	1.89 m (6 ft 2 1/2 in)	(Argentina) Chacarita Juniors
	Romel Quiñones	(Bolivia)	GK	June 25, 1992 (age 34)	1.82 m (5 ft 11 1/2 in)	(Bolivia) Academia Tahuichi Aguilera
	Diego Zamora	(Bolivia)	GK	September 12, 1993 (age 33)	1.76 m (5 ft 9 1/2 in)	(Bolivia) Club Bolívar
Defenders
5	Pablo Frontini	(Argentina)	CB	May 3, 1984 (age 42)	1.83 m (6 ft 0 in)	(Argentina) River Plate
	Edemir Rodríguez	(Bolivia)	CB / | RB	October 21, 1986 (age 40)	1.75 m (5 ft 9 in)	(Bolivia) Real Potosí
	Jorge Ignacio Cuellar	(Bolivia)	CB	April 29, 1991 (age 35)	1.85 m (6 ft 1 in)	(Bolivia) Club
	Alejandro Mendez	(Bolivia)	CB	January 11, 1991 (age 35)		(Bolivia) Academia Tahuichi Aguilera
	Enrique Bustillos	(Bolivia)	RB	March 29, 1988 (age 38)	1.72 m (5 ft 7 1/2 in)	(Bolivia) Club Bolívar
	Ronald Eguino	(Bolivia)	RB	February 20, 1988 (age 38)	1.83 m (6 ft 0 in)	(Bolivia) Real Potosí
	Miguel Rimba	(Bolivia)	RB		1.76 m (5 ft 9 1/2 in)	(Bolivia) Club Bolívar
	Ariel Ribera	(Bolivia)	RB	February 8, 1985 (age 41)		(Bolivia) Oriente Petrolero
	Lorgio Alvarez	(Bolivia)	LB	June 29, 1978 (age 48)	1.79 m (5 ft 10 1/2 in)	(Bolivia) Club Blooming
	Abraham Cabrera	(Bolivia)	LB	August 25, 1989 (age 37)	1.80 m (5 ft 11 in)	(Bolivia) Club Bolívar
	Juan Carlos Zampiery	(Bolivia)	LB	August 25, 1989 (age 37)		(Bolivia) La Paz Futbol Club
Midfielders
	Wálter Flores	(Bolivia)	DM	October 29, 1978 (age 47)	1.72 m (5 ft 7 1/2 in)	(Bolivia) San José
	Damir Miranda	(Bolivia)	DM	October 6, 1985 (age 41)	1.73 m (5 ft 8 in)	(Bolivia) Club Destroyers
	Gabriel Valverde	(Bolivia)	DM	June 24, 1990 (age 36)	1.78 m (5 ft 10 in)	(Bolivia) Club Bolívar
	Ronald Rea	(Bolivia)	DM	March 29, 1988 (age 38)	1.74 m (5 ft 8 1/2 in)	(Bolivia) Oriente Petrolero
	Rafael Rico	(Bolivia)	DM		1.74 m (5 ft 8 1/2 in)	(Bolivia)
	Rudy Cardozo	(Bolivia)	AM	February 14, 1990 (age 36)	1.71 m (5 ft 7 1/2 in)	(Bolivia) Academia Tahuichi Aguilera
	Abdon Reyes	(Bolivia)	AM	November 7, 1981 (age 44)	1.70 m (5 ft 7 in)	(Bolivia) Club Bolívar
	Damián Lizio	(Argentina)	AM	June 30, 1989 (age 37)	1.68 m (5 ft 6 in)	(Argentina) River Plate
	Jhasmani Campos	(Bolivia)	AM	October 5, 1988 (age 38)	1.74 m (5 ft 8 1/2 in)	(Bolivia) Academia Tahuichi Aguilera
	Diego Rivero	(Bolivia)	AM	June 16, 1991 (age 35)	1.74 m (5 ft 8 1/2 in)	(Bolivia) Blooming
	Carlos Kassab	(Bolivia)	AM	March 9, 1991 (age 35)	1.68 m (5 ft 6 in)	(Bolivia) Club Bolívar
	Jhon Carinao	(Bolivia)	CM	September 13, 1991 (age 35)	1.72 m (5 ft 7 1/2 in)	(Bolivia) Club Bolívar
Forwards
	William Ferreira	(Uruguay)	CF	February 25, 1983 (age 43)	1.76 m (5 ft 9 1/2 in)	(Uruguay) Club Nacional de Football
	José Alfredo Castillo	(Bolivia)	CF	February 9, 1983 (age 43)	1.81 m (5 ft 11 1/2 in)	(Bolivia) Oriente Petrolero
	John Córdoba	(Colombia)	CF	February 10, 1987 (age 39)	1.72 m (5 ft 7 1/2 in)	(Colombia)
	Rodrigo Vargas	(Bolivia)	CF	September 1, 1989 (age 37)	1.76 m (5 ft 9 1/2 in)	(Bolivia) Club Bolívar
	Walter Bowles	(Bolivia)	CF	April 22, 1989 (age 37)	1.76 m (5 ft 9 1/2 in)	(Bolivia) Blooming

=== Player stats ===
N	P	Nat.	Player	GS	APP	Goal	Min.	Notes
13	GK	(Argentina)	Marcos Arguello	3	3	-3	270	.
2	DF	(Bolivia)	Edemir Rodríguez	3	3	.	270	.
4	DF	(Bolivia)	Lorgio Alvarez	3	3	.	270	.
25	MF	(Bolivia)	Damir Miranda	3	3	.	270	.
28	CW	(Uruguay)	William Ferreira	3	3	6	270	.
16	MF	(Bolivia)	Walter Flores	3	3	.	128	.
22	DF	(Bolivia)	Ronald Eguino	3	3	.	212	.
10	MF	(Bolivia)	Rudy Cardozo	3	3	.	235	.
11	MF	(Argentina)	Damián Lizio	3	3	.	264	.
