= 2011 Copa América Group A =

Group in football tournament

Group A of the 2011 Copa América was one of the three groups of competing nations in the 2011 Copa América. It comprised Argentina, Bolivia, Colombia, and Costa Rica. Group play ran from 1 to 11 July 2011.

Colombia won the group and faced Peru, the best third-placed finishers, in the quarter-finals. Argentina finished second and faced Uruguay—the runners-up of Group C—in the quarter-finals. Costa Rica and Bolivia finished third and fourth in the group, respectively, and were eliminated from the tournament, with the former finished as the worst third-placed team.

== Standings ==
Team	Pld	W	D	L	GF	GA	GD	Pts
Colombia	3	2	1	0	3	0	+3	7
Argentina (H)	3	1	2	0	4	1	+3	5
Costa Rica	3	1	0	2	2	4	−2	3
Bolivia	3	0	1	2	1	5	−4	1

(H) Hosts
Teams that advanced to the quarter-finals
- Group winners
- Group runners-up
- Best two third-placed teams among all groups

All times are in local, Argentina Time (UTC−03:00).

== Argentina vs Bolivia ==
1 July 2011
21:45

Argentina	1–1	Bolivia
Agüero 75'	Report	Rojas 47'

Estadio Ciudad de La Plata, La Plata
Referee: Roberto Silvera (Uruguay)

Argentina	Bolivia

GK	23	Sergio Romero
RB	8	Javier Zanetti
CB	4	Nicolás Burdisso
CB	6	Gabriel Milito
LB	17	Marcos Rojo
RM	19	Éver Banega
CM	14	Javier Mascherano (c)
LM	5	Esteban Cambiasso		(substituted off) 46'
RW	21	Ezequiel Lavezzi	(yellow card) 54'	(substituted off) 70'
LW	11	Carlos Tevez	(yellow card) 37'
CF	10	Lionel Messi
Substitutions:
MF	7	Ángel Di María		(substituted on) 46'
FW	16	Sergio Agüero		(substituted on) 70'
Manager:
Sergio Batista

GK	1	Carlos Erwin Arias
RB	4	Lorgio Álvarez
CB	16	Ronald Raldes (c)
CB	5	Ronald Rivero	(yellow card) 87'
LB	3	Luis Gutiérrez	(yellow card) 38'
RM	15	Jaime Robles
CM	6	Wálter Flores	(yellow card) 34'
LM	21	Jhasmani Campos		(substituted off) 80'
AM	10	Joselito Vaca		(substituted off) 63'
CF	7	Edivaldo Rojas		(substituted off) 89'
CF	9	Marcelo Moreno
Substitutions:
MF	19	José Luis Chávez	(yellow card) 75'	(substituted on) 63'
FW	17	Juan Carlos Arce		(substituted on) 80'
MF	22	Rudy Cardozo		(substituted on) 89'
Manager:
Gustavo Quinteros

Man of the Match:
Lionel Messi (Argentina)

Assistant referees:
Miguel Nievas (Uruguay)
Luis Alvarado (Ecuador)
Fourth official:
Carlos Vera (Ecuador)

== Colombia vs Costa Rica ==
2 July 2011
15:30

Colombia	1–0	Costa Rica
Ramos 44'	Report

Estadio 23 de Agosto, Jujuy
Referee: Enrique Osses (Chile)

Colombia	Costa Rica

GK	12	Neco Martínez
RB	18	Juan Camilo Zúñiga	(yellow card) 54'
CB	14	Luis Amaranto Perea
CB	3	Mario Yepes (c)
LB	7	Pablo Armero
RM	4	Gustavo Bolívar
CM	13	Fredy Guarín	(yellow card) 53'
LM	8	Abel Aguilar		(substituted off) 33'
RW	17	Dayro Moreno		(substituted off) 69'
LW	20	Adrián Ramos
CF	9	Radamel Falcao		(substituted off) 77'
Substitutions:
FW	11	Hugo Rodallega		(substituted on) 33'
FW	19	Teófilo Gutiérrez		(substituted on) 69'
MF	16	Elkin Soto		(substituted on) 77'
Manager:
Hernán Darío Gómez

GK	18	Leonel Moreira
RB	6	Heiner Mora
CB	3	Jhonny Acosta
CB	19	Óscar Duarte
CB	2	Francisco Calvo	(yellow card) 23'
LB	20	Pedro Leal
CM	8	David Guzmán	(yellow card) 19'	(substituted off) 74'
CM	11	Diego Madrigal	(yellow card) 15'	(substituted off) 71'
RW	10	Randall Brenes (c)	(red card) 27'
LW	4	José Salvatierra
CF	12	Joel Campbell		(substituted off) 46'
Substitutions:
FW	21	César Elizondo		(substituted on) 46'
FW	17	Josué Martínez		(substituted on) 71'
MF	22	José Miguel Cubero		(substituted on) 74'
Manager:
Ricardo La Volpe (Argentina)

Man of the Match:
Adrián Ramos (Colombia)

Assistant referees:
Francisco Mondria (Chile)
Nicolás Yegros (Paraguay)
Fourth official:
Antonio Arias (Paraguay)

== Argentina vs Colombia ==
6 July 2011
21:45

Argentina	0–0	Colombia
	Report

Estadio Brigadier General Estanislao López, Santa Fe
Referee: Sálvio Fagundes (Brazil)

Argentina	Colombia

GK	23	Sergio Romero
RB	3	Pablo Zabaleta
CB	4	Nicolás Burdisso
CB	6	Gabriel Milito
LB	8	Javier Zanetti
RM	19	Éver Banega		(substituted off) 71'
CM	14	Javier Mascherano (c)
LM	5	Esteban Cambiasso		(substituted off) 64'
RW	21	Ezequiel Lavezzi		(substituted off) 64'
LW	11	Carlos Tevez
CF	10	Lionel Messi
Substitutions:
MF	20	Fernando Gago	(yellow card) 90'	(substituted on) 64'
FW	16	Sergio Agüero		(substituted on) 64'
FW	9	Gonzalo Higuaín		(substituted on) 71'
Manager:
Sergio Batista

GK	12	Neco Martínez
RB	18	Juan Camilo Zúñiga
CB	14	Luis Amaranto Perea
CB	3	Mario Yepes (c)
LB	7	Pablo Armero
DM	6	Carlos Sánchez
RM	17	Dayro Moreno	(yellow card) 90+1'	(substituted off) 90+1'
CM	13	Fredy Guarín
CM	8	Abel Aguilar	(yellow card) 6'
LM	20	Adrián Ramos		(substituted off) 89'
CF	9	Radamel Falcao		(substituted off) 87'
Substitutions:
FW	19	Teófilo Gutiérrez		(substituted on) 87'
MF	16	Elkin Soto		(substituted on) 89'
DF	22	Aquivaldo Mosquera		(substituted on) 90+1'
Manager:
Hernán Darío Gómez

Man of the Match:
Sergio Romero (Argentina)

Assistant referees:
Marcio Santiago (Brazil)
Luis Abadie (Peru)
Fourth official:
Víctor Hugo Rivera (Peru)

== Bolivia vs Costa Rica ==
7 July 2011
19:15

Bolivia	0–2	Costa Rica
	Report	Martínez 59'; Campbell 78'

Estadio 23 de Agosto, Jujuy
Referee: Carlos Vera (Ecuador)

Bolivia	Costa Rica

GK	1	Carlos Erwin Arias
RB	4	Lorgio Álvarez	(yellow card) 35'
CB	16	Ronald Raldes (c)
CB	5	Ronald Rivero	(yellow card) 65' (red card) 70'
LB	3	Luis Gutiérrez	(yellow card) 87'
RM	7	Edivaldo Rojas		(substituted off) 67'
CM	15	Jaime Robles		(substituted off) 67'
CM	6	Wálter Flores	(red card) 75'
LM	21	Jhasmani Campos	(yellow card) 73'	(substituted off) 79'
CF	17	Juan Carlos Arce
CF	9	Marcelo Moreno	(yellow card) 57'
Substitutions:
FW	11	Alcides Peña		(substituted on) 67'
MF	19	José Luis Chávez		(substituted on) 67'
MF	8	Ronald García		(substituted on) 79'
Manager:
Gustavo Quinteros

GK	18	Leonel Moreira
CB	3	Jhonny Acosta (c)
CB	19	Óscar Duarte	(yellow card) 46'
CB	2	Francisco Calvo
CM	4	José Salvatierra	(yellow card) 83'
CM	8	David Guzmán	(yellow card) 29'
CM	11	Diego Madrigal		(substituted off) 45'
RW	6	Heiner Mora		(substituted off) 82'
LW	20	Pedro Leal
CF	12	Joel Campbell
CF	17	Josué Martínez		(substituted off) 81'
Substitutions:
MF	7	Allen Guevara		(substituted on) 45'
FW	21	César Elizondo		(substituted on) 81'
MF	22	José Miguel Cubero		(substituted on) 82'
Manager:
Ricardo La Volpe (Argentina)

Man of the Match:
Joel Campbell (Costa Rica)

Assistant referees:
Luis Alvarado (Ecuador)
Marvin Torrentera (Mexico)
Fourth official:
Francisco Chacón (Mexico)

== Colombia vs Bolivia ==
10 July 2011
16:00

Colombia	2–0	Bolivia
Falcao 14', 28' (pen.)	Report

Estadio Brigadier General Estanislao López, Santa Fe
Referee: Francisco Chacón (Mexico)

Colombia	Bolivia

GK	12	Neco Martínez
RB	18	Juan Camilo Zúñiga
CB	14	Luis Amaranto Perea
CB	3	Mario Yepes (c)
LB	7	Pablo Armero
RM	13	Fredy Guarín	(substituted off) 50'
CM	6	Carlos Sánchez
LM	8	Abel Aguilar
RW	17	Dayro Moreno	(substituted off) 46'
LW	20	Adrián Ramos	(substituted off) 77'
CF	9	Radamel Falcao
Substituitions:
FW	11	Hugo Rodallega	(substituted on) 46'
MF	10	Juan Cuadrado	(substituted on) 50'
MF	16	Elkin Soto	(substituted on) 77'
Manager:
Hernán Darío Gómez

GK	1	Carlos Erwin Arias
RB	14	Christian Vargas
CB	16	Ronald Raldes (c)
CB	13	Santos Amador
LB	4	Lorgio Álvarez
RM	15	Jaime Robles
CM	8	Ronald García
LM	21	Jhasmani Campos	(yellow card) 33'
RW	7	Edivaldo Rojas		(substituted off) 46'
LW	17	Juan Carlos Arce		(substituted off) 70'
CF	9	Marcelo Moreno		(substituted off) 60'
Substitutions:
MF	10	Joselito Vaca		(substituted on) 46'
FW	11	Alcides Peña		(substituted on) 60'
FW	18	Ricardo Pedriel		(substituted on) 70'
Manager:
Gustavo Quinteros

Man of the Match:
Radamel Falcao (Colombia)

Assistant referees:
Marvin Torrentera (Mexico)
Luis Sánchez (Venezuela)
Fourth official:
Juan Soto (Venezuela)

== Argentina vs Costa Rica ==
11 July 2011
21:45

Argentina	3–0	Costa Rica
Agüero 45+1', 52'; Di María 63'	Report

Estadio Mario Alberto Kempes, Córdoba
Referee: Víctor Hugo Rivera (Peru)

Argentina	Costa Rica

GK	23	Sergio Romero
RB	3	Pablo Zabaleta
CB	4	Nicolás Burdisso
CB	6	Gabriel Milito	(yellow card) 21'
LB	8	Javier Zanetti	(yellow card) 38'
CM	20	Fernando Gago
CM	14	Javier Mascherano (c)
RW	10	Lionel Messi
AM	7	Ángel Di María		(substituted off) 79'
LW	16	Sergio Agüero		(substituted off) 84'
CF	9	Gonzalo Higuaín		(substituted off) 79'
Substitutions:
MF	15	Lucas Biglia	(yellow card) 88'	(substituted on) 79'
MF	18	Javier Pastore		(substituted on) 79'
FW	21	Ezequiel Lavezzi	(yellow card) 90+2'	(substituted on) 84'
Manager:
Sergio Batista

GK	18	Leonel Moreira
CB	3	Jhonny Acosta (c)
CB	19	Óscar Duarte	(yellow card) 48'
CB	2	Francisco Calvo	(yellow card) 44'	(substituted off) 46'
CM	4	José Salvatierra
CM	22	José Miguel Cubero
CM	20	Pedro Leal
RW	6	Heiner Mora
LW	21	César Elizondo		(substituted off) 56'
CF	17	Josué Martínez		(substituted off) 46'
CF	12	Joel Campbell
Substitutions:
FW	10	Randall Brenes		(substituted on) 46'
MF	11	Diego Madrigal		(substituted on) 46'
MF	5	Luis Miguel Valle		(substituted on) 56'
Manager:
Ricardo La Volpe (Argentina)

Man of the Match:
Lionel Messi (Argentina)

Assistant referees:
Luis Abadie (Peru)
Nicolas Yegros (Paraguay)
Fourth official:
Carlos Amarilla (Paraguay)
