= Marcelo Gomes =

Marcelo Gomes may refer to:

- Marcelo Gomes (dancer) (born 1979), Brazilian ballet dancer
- Marcelo Gomes (director) (born 1963), Brazilian film director
- Marcelo Gomes (footballer) (born 1981), Brazilian footballer
