= Joel Campbell =

Costa Rican footballer (born 1992)

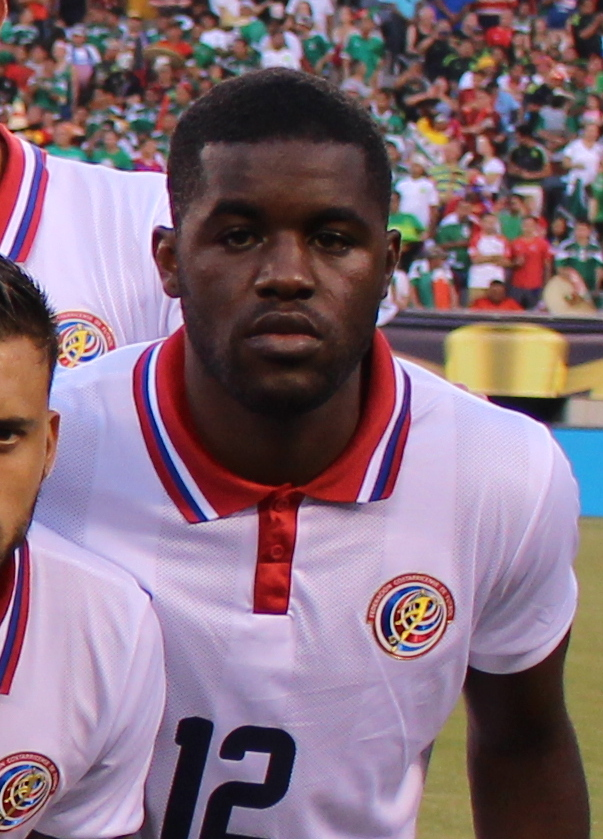
- Campbell with Costa Rica at the 2015 CONCACAF Gold Cup

Personal information
- Full name: Joel Nathaniel Campbell Samuels
- Date of birth: 26 June 1992 (age 34)
- Place of birth: San José, Costa Rica
- Height: 1.78 m (5 ft 10 in)
- Positions: Winger; forward

Team information
- Current team: Inter de San Carlos
- Number: 10

Youth career
- 2002–2004: Alajuelense
- 2004–2009: Saprissa

Senior career*
Years	Team	Apps	(Gls)
2009–2011	Saprissa	3	(0)
2011	→ Puntarenas (loan)	5	(0)
2011–2018	Arsenal	23	(3)
2011–2012	→ Lorient (loan)	25	(3)
2011–2012	→ Lorient II (loan)	5	(1)
2012–2013	→ Betis (loan)	28	(2)
2013–2014	→ Olympiacos (loan)	32	(8)
2015	→ Villarreal (loan)	16	(1)
2016–2017	→ Sporting CP (loan)	19	(3)
2017–2018	→ Betis (loan)	8	(2)
2018–2020	Frosinone	17	(0)
2019–2020	→ León (loan)	42	(5)
2020–2023	León	70	(4)
2021–2022	→ Monterrey (loan)	32	(4)
2023–2026	Alajuelense	82	(18)
2024–2025	→ Atlético-GO (loan)	9	(2)
2026–	→ Inter de San Carlos	0	(0)

International career^{‡}
2008–2009	Costa Rica U17	9	(8)
2010–2011	Costa Rica U20	13	(10)
2011–	Costa Rica	150	(27)
Medal record
Representing Costa Rica
Men's football
Copa Centroamericana
Winner	2014 United States
- * Club domestic league appearances and goals as of 22:50, 3 November 2025 (UTC) ‡ National team caps and goals as of 23:04, 18 November 2025 (UTC)

Joel Nathaniel Campbell Samuels (Spanish pronunciation: [ɟʝoˈel ˈkambel]; born 26 June 1992) is a Costa Rican professional footballer who plays as a winger or forward for Liga FPD club Inter de San Carlos and the Costa Rica national team.

Campbell joined Arsenal in 2011 and was thereafter loaned out to French side Lorient, Spanish club Real Betis and Greek outfit Olympiacos. He made his competitive Arsenal debut as the club won the 2014 FA Community Shield. He was again sent on loan to La Liga team Villarreal before he scored his first Arsenal goal in 2015.

Campbell has so far earned over 140 caps for Costa Rica and was a member of the squad which won the 2014 Copa Centroamericana. He was also part of the Costa Rican side which reached the last eight of the 2014 FIFA World Cup, and played in the 2018 and 2022 editions as well. Campbell additionally helped Costa Rica get to the quarter-finals of the 2015, 2019, 2021 and 2023 CONCACAF Gold Cups, as well as the semi-finals of the 2017 Gold Cup.

== Club career ==
=== Saprissa ===
Campbell's career began with Saprissa in 2009 before being sent on loan to Puntarenas in January 2011.

On 28 July 2011, Costa Rican television reported that Campbell had come to an agreement with Arsenal, after having been discovered by club scout Danny Karbassiyoon. Campbell later said that while he had not yet signed, talks were taking place. On 6 August, Costa Rican media reported that Campbell was set to sign a five-year deal with Arsenal, after rejecting moves to Sevilla and Fiorentina. According to Campbell, he was also approached by Manchester United's Alex Ferguson, who wanted to bring him under Ryan Giggs' mentorship.

=== Arsenal ===
On 19 August 2011, Arsenal confirmed that they had signed Campbell, but it was reported eight days later that he had failed to obtain a work permit to enable him to play in England. Campbell finally received that permit in July 2013.

==== Loan to Lorient ====
Unable to get a work permit in England, Campbell along with Gilles Sunu both joined French club Lorient, with Campbell moving on loan and Sunu on a permanent transfer. He made his debut for Lorient as a 79th-minute substitute for Grégory Bourillon in the 1–1 draw away to Sochaux, and created the assist for Innocent Emeghara to score and earn Lorient an away point. On 1 October, he scored his first goal for Lorient against Valenciennes in the 2–0 win, Campbell's right-footed shot found the bottom left hand corner of the goal. On 26 October, Campbell scored his second goal for Lorient in a Coupe de la Ligue match against Montpellier. He scored his third goal also against Montpellier in a 2–1 win which proved to be the winner.

==== Loan to Real Betis ====
On 6 July 2012, Campbell joined La Liga side Real Betis on a season-long loan. He made his debut on 25 August, coming on as a substitute for Salvador Agra to play the last 20 minutes in their 2–1 home defeat to Rayo Vallecano.

Campbell played 28 league matches and scored two goals; his first was on 2 December, to give Betis a 3–2 away win against Deportivo de La Coruña, and his second came in the seventh minute of a 2–0 home victory against Levante on 13 January.

==== Loan to Olympiacos ====
By summer 2013, Campbell had been granted a work permit in England but he joined Greek side Olympiacos on another one-year loan.

On 27 October 2013, Campbell starred in Olympiacos' win over OFI, picking up four assists to help his side win 5–1. Campbell impressed again on 10 November, scoring once and earning two assists as Olympiacos thrashed PAOK 4–0.

On 25 February 2014, Campbell scored the second goal Olympiacos' 2–0 win over Manchester United in the last 16 of the UEFA Champions League. Olympiacos, however, did not proceed to the next round, after losing 3–0 in the second leg.

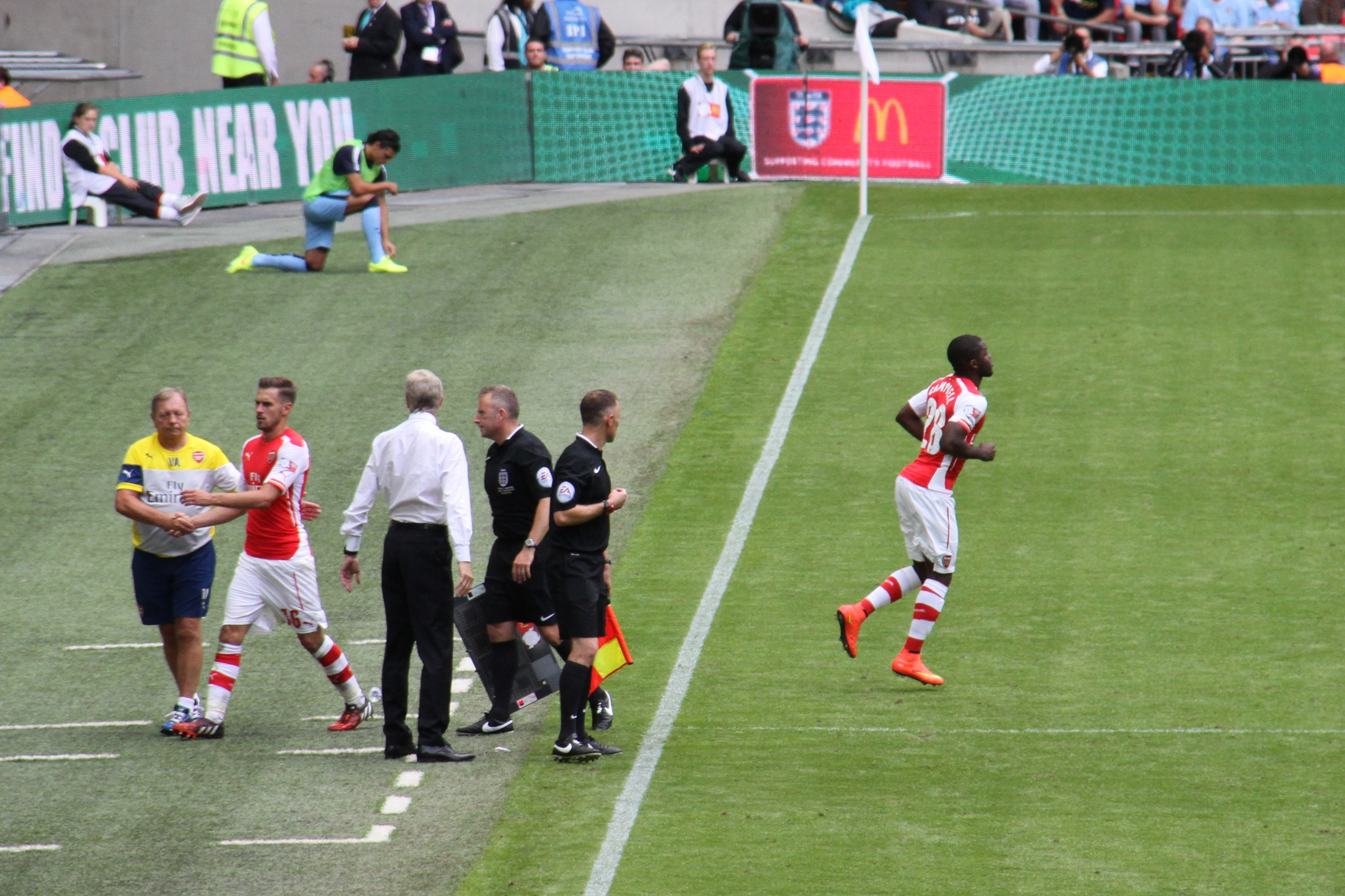
Campbell making his debut for Arsenal in the 2014 FA Community Shield

==== Return to Arsenal ====
Arsenal manager Arsène Wenger announced that Campbell would be part of his first team plans for Arsenal's 2014–15 season. On 2 August 2014, Campbell scored in Arsenal's 5–1 win over Benfica in the Emirates Cup. Eight days later in the 2014 FA Community Shield, he replaced Aaron Ramsey for the final five minutes of the 3–0 win over Manchester City at Wembley. He made his Premier League debut on 23 August in a 2–2 draw against Everton at Goodison Park, coming off the bench to replace Alex Oxlade-Chamberlain on the 74th minute of the match.

Campbell's first Arsenal start came in the third round of the League Cup on 23 September, lining up in attack with Alexis Sánchez and Lukas Podolski in a 1–2 home defeat against Southampton. BBC Sport described Campbell and Podolski as "largely anonymous" during the match.

During an April 2020 interview for TD Más, Campbell recalled his frustration during this time, revealing that Arsenal had declined an offer by Benfica to sign him, because "they [Arsenal] told me they needed me because Giroud was injured," but Arsenal nonetheless decided to sign Danny Welbeck.

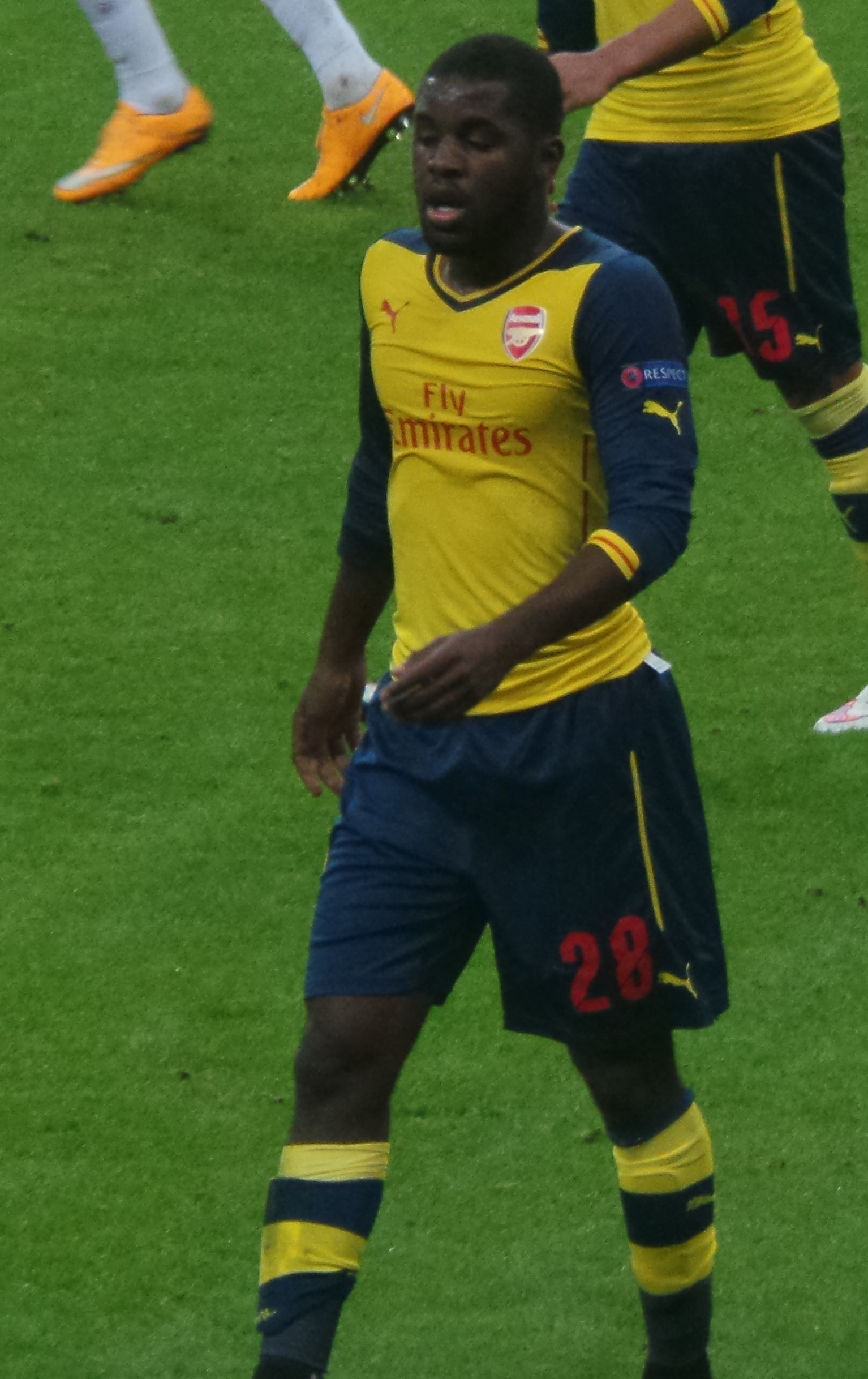
Campbell while featuring for Arsenal

==== Loan to Villarreal ====
On 24 January 2015, Villarreal announced the signing of Campbell on loan until the end of the season. On 10 May, he scored his first goal for the team, the only goal in a victory over fellow Valencians Elche, which secured sixth place for The Yellow Submarine in La Liga and entry into the following season's UEFA Europa League.

==== 2015–16 season ====
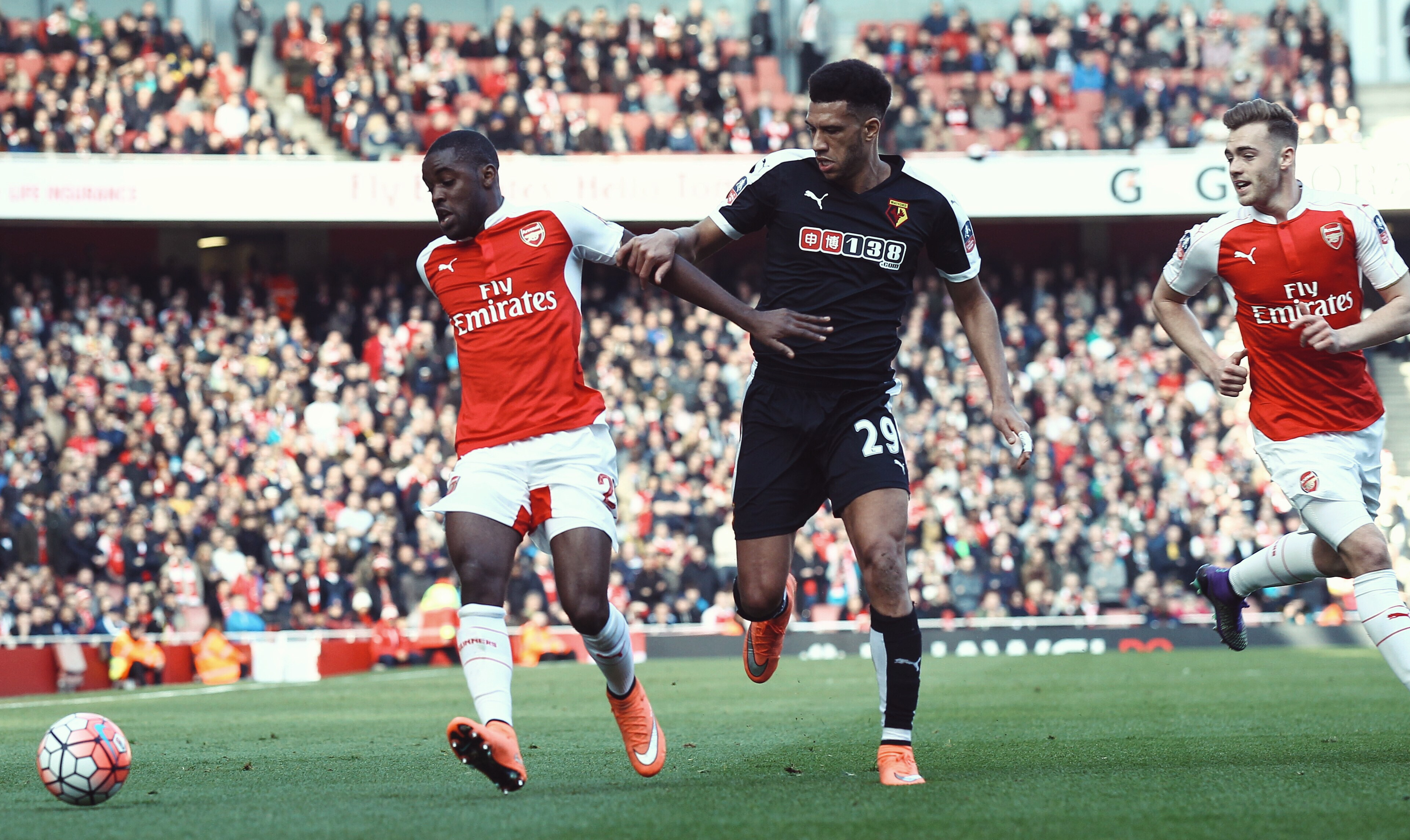
Campbell with Arsenal against Watford in 2016. Campbell points this match as the moment he lost his regularity with the team

After returning from his loan at Villarreal, Campbell started his first game of the season in a 2–1 win against Tottenham Hotspur in the League Cup third round on 23 September 2015. On 31 October, due to injuries to Theo Walcott and Alex Oxlade-Chamberlain, Campbell made his first Premier League start for the club against Swansea City at the Liberty Stadium, scoring his first competitive goal in a 3–0 win. Having scored his first Premier League goal, Campbell scored his first Emirates goal against Sunderland on 6 December, the first for Arsenal in a 3–1 win. The sides faced at the Emirates again in the FA Cup third round on 9 January 2016, with Campbell again scoring Arsenal's first as they matched the scoreline they achieved just over a month earlier.

Campbell recounted that he had lost regularity at Arsenal after a 1–2 defeat to Watford. Campbell, "with tears in [his] eyes out of helplessness," asked Arsène Wenger about this situation, to which Wenger replied "I noticed you were tired;" but despite Campbell's desire to play, he remained irregular during the season. Frustrated, Campbell requested a new loan.

==== Loan to Sporting CP ====
On 28 July, in the 2016 MLS All-Star Game in San Jose, California, Campbell won an early penalty when fouled by Laurent Ciman, and took it himself to open a 2–1 victory. On 21 August 2016, Portuguese Primeira Liga side Sporting CP signed Campbell on loan until the end of the season, becoming a teammate of his countryman Bryan Ruiz. As Sporting and Real Madrid were drawn into the same group of the UEFA Champions League season, Spain's Marca and Costa Rica's La Nación and Teletica pointed that Campbell, Ruiz, and Keylor Navas would feature in the first-ever Champions League match to feature three Costa Rican players.

==== Second loan spell with Real Betis ====
Campbell joined Real Betis on loan for a second time on 31 August 2017. He went on to pick up an injury in a game against Espanyol in late October 2017. This put him out of action for another three months. Campbell sought to make a comeback to the club's training squad in late January 2018.

=== Frosinone ===
On 17 August 2018, Campbell signed a three-year contract with Frosinone.

==== Loan to Club León ====
In January 2019, he was loaned out to León for 18 months after failing to score in 17 games.

==== Loan to C.F. Monterrey ====
In 2021, Campbell was loaned out to Monterrey.

== International career ==
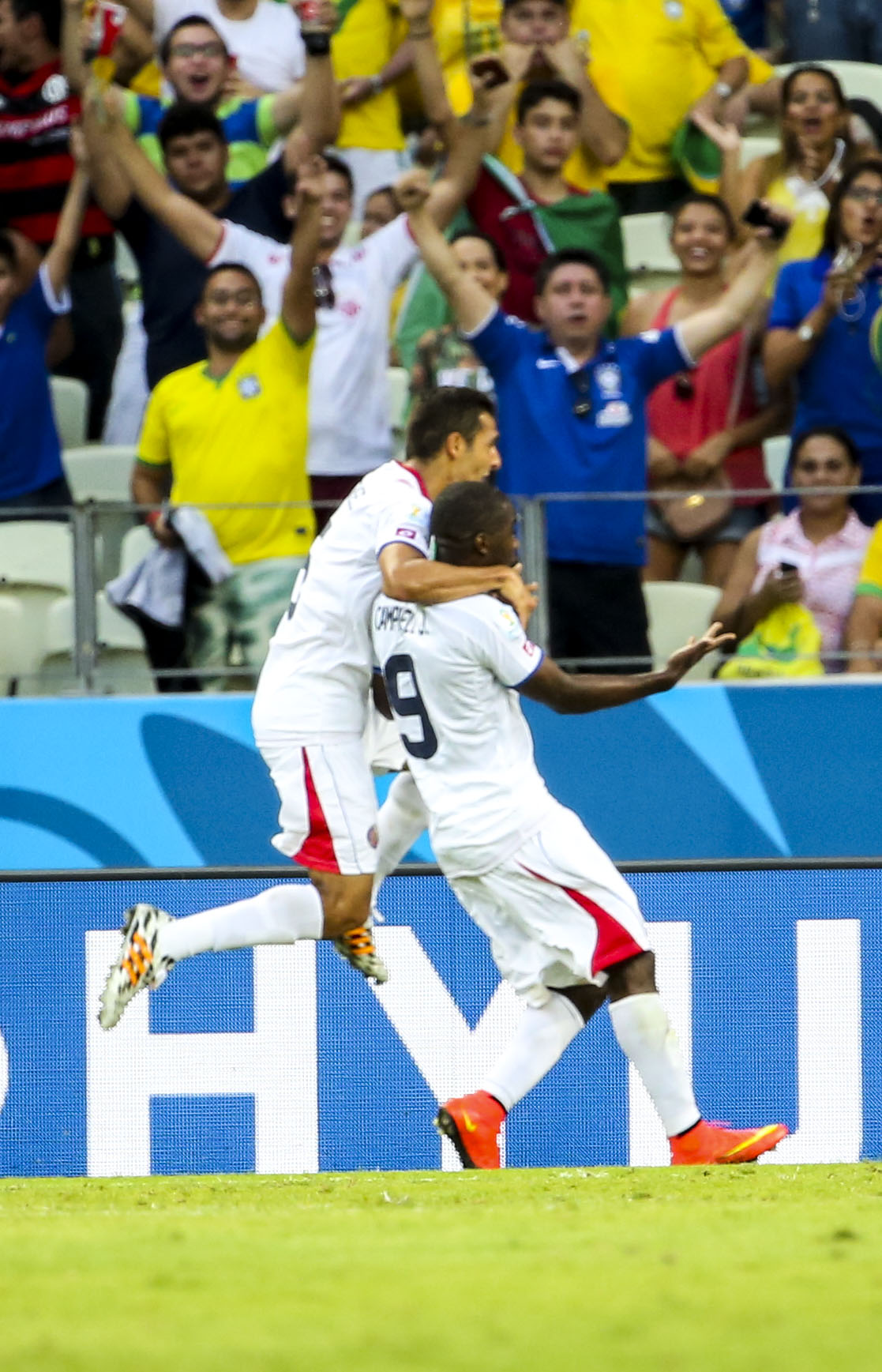
Campbell and Celso Borges celebrating against Uruguay at the 2014 FIFA World Cup

Campbell was selected for Costa Rica's squad for the 2009 CONCACAF U-17 Championship. He was the team's highest scorer, although he had only two goals in total. That same year, he participated in the 2009 FIFA U-17 World Cup held in Nigeria. He was named in the 2011 CONCACAF U-20 Championship two years later and tied for top scorer with six goals.

Campbell was first called up to the senior team in March 2011, for friendlies with PR China and Argentina. He would juggle cans on the streets of San José. Before the friendlies, he was spotted doing this by national team manager Ricardo La Volpe. In announcing Campbell's inclusion in the squad, La Volpe said, "Who is Messi? Who is Neymar? Gentlemen of the press – I present to you: Campbell. I discovered him playing with cans."

Campbell was called up for the 2011 CONCACAF Gold Cup in the United States. In their group opener on 5 June at Cowboys Stadium, he replaced Marco Ureña in the 56th minute and a quarter of an hour later volleyed a goal to conclude a 5–0 win over Cuba. In the quarter-finals at the MetLife Stadium, he again came on for Ureña in the second half of extra time; the game went to a penalty shootout in which Campbell netted his attempt but Honduras advanced 4–2.

Campbell was part of Costa Rica's squad when they were invited to the 2011 Copa América in Argentina, and started all of their games as they came third in Group A and were eliminated. In their second group game, on 7 July at the Estadio 23 de Agosto in Jujuy, he concluded a 2–0 win over Bolivia after being set up by Heiner Mora, and was also fouled for Wálter Flores' red card.

In September 2013, Campbell became the subject of controversy when video emerged of his off-the-ball dive against the United States' Matt Besler in a World Cup qualifying match. Besler received a yellow card and was suspended. The footage generated discussion of the quality of CONCACAF refereeing, and whether such cheating should be eligible for post-match disciplinary action. Campbell's dive was described as "pathetic", "cynical" and "disgraceful". On 13 September, the Costa Rican media reported that FIFA were investigating Campbell over the incident, although nothing came of the investigation. On 4 October, FIFA officially reprimanded Campbell for unsporting behaviour.

On 14 June 2014, Campbell scored Costa Rica's first goal in the 2014 FIFA World Cup, equalising against Uruguay in an eventual 3–1 victory. His pass to Marco Ureña also set up Costa Rica's third goal in the game. During the round of 16, Campbell was the fourth of five Costa Rican players to successfully convert his kick in a 5–3 penalty shootout victory over Greece.

Campbell was again called up to Costa Rica's squad for the Gold Cup of 2017.

In May 2018 he was named in Costa Rica's 23-man squad for the 2018 FIFA World Cup in Russia.

== Personal life ==
Joel Campbell is the son of Humberto Campbell and Roxana Samuels and is of Jamaican descent. He is in a relationship with Maria Fernanda Cascante. He has three siblings by the names of Nekisha, Humberto and Katherine. Campbell is a devout Christian. He says that family is the second pillar in his life, with the first being God. Campbell also recites Psalm 27 before every game.

== Career statistics ==
=== Club ===
As of match played 3 November 2025

Appearances and goals by club, season and competition
Club	Season	League			National cup		League cup		Continental		Other		Total	
Club	Season	Division	Apps	Goals	Apps	Goals	Apps	Goals	Apps	Goals	Apps	Goals	Apps	Goals
Saprissa	2009–10	Costa Rican Primera División	1	0	—		—		—		—		1	0
Saprissa	2010–11	Costa Rican Primera División	2	0	—		—		1 (Note: Appearances in CONCACAF Champions League)	0	—		3	0
Saprissa	Total		3	0	—		—		1	0	—		4	0
Puntarenas (loan)	2010–11	Costa Rican Primera División	5	0	—		—		—		—		5	0
Lorient (loan)	2011–12	Ligue 1	25	3	1	0	1	1	—		—		27	4
Lorient II (loan)	2011–12	CFA	5	1	—		—		—		—		5	1
Real Betis (loan)	2012–13	La Liga	28	2	5	0	—		—		—		33	2
Olympiacos (loan)	2013–14	Super League Greece	32	8	6	2	—		5 (Note: Appearances in UEFA Champions League)	1	—		43	11
Arsenal	2014–15	Premier League	4	0	1	0	1	0	3	0	1 (Note: Appearance in Community Shield)	0	10	0
Arsenal	2015–16	Premier League	19	3	4	1	2	0	5	0	—		30	4
Arsenal	2016–17	Premier League	0	0	—		—		—		—		0	0
Arsenal	Total		23	3	5	1	3	0	8	0	1	0	40	4
Villarreal (loan)	2014–15	La Liga	16	1	2	0	—		4 (Note: Appearances in UEFA Europa League)	0	—		22	1
Sporting CP (loan)	2016–17	Primeira Liga	19	3	2	0	3	0	4	0	—		28	3
Real Betis (loan)	2017–18	La Liga	8	2	1	0	—		—		—		9	2
Frosinone	2018–19	Serie A	17	0	—		—		—		—		17	0
León (loan)	2018–19	Liga MX	19	4	2	0	—		—		—		21	4
León (loan)	2019–20	Liga MX	23	1	–		–		–		–		23	1
León (loan)	Total		42	5	2	0	—		—		—		44	5
León	2020–21	Liga MX	38	2	—		—		1	0	—		39	2
León	2022–23	Liga MX	32	2	–		–		8	0	–		40	2
León	Total		70	4	—		—		9	0	—		79	4
Monterrey (loan)	2021–22	Liga MX	32	4	—		—		—		2 (Note: Appearances in FIFA Club World Cup)	0	34	4
León	2022–23	Liga MX	32	2	—		—		8	0	—		40	2
Alajuelense	2023–24	Liga FPD	44	13	—		—		9	0	2 (Note: Appearances in CONCACAF Central American Cup)	0	55	13
Alajuelense	2024–25	Liga FPD	13	1	1	1	—		2	0	—		16	2
Alajuelense	2025–26	Liga FPD	8	3	0	0	—		0	0	5 (Note: One Appearance in Supercopa de Costa Rica, four appearances and one goal in CONCACAF Central American Cup)	1	13	4
Alajuelense	Total		65	17	1	1	—		11	0	7	1	84	19
Atlético-GO (loan)	2024	Série A	9	2	0	0	—		—		0	0	9	2
Career totals			431	57	25	4	7	1	50	1	8	1	521	64

=== International ===
As of match played 18 November 2025

Appearances and goals by national team and year
National team	Year	Apps	Goals
Costa Rica	2011	9	3
Costa Rica	2012	10	4
Costa Rica	2013	11	1
Costa Rica	2014	12	2
Costa Rica	2015	15	1
Costa Rica	2016	11	3
Costa Rica	2017	6	0
Costa Rica	2018	9	3
Costa Rica	2019	10	0
Costa Rica	2020	1	1
Costa Rica	2021	15	3
Costa Rica	2022	13	4
Costa Rica	2023	12	2
Costa Rica	2024	14	0
Costa Rica	2025	2	0
Total		150	27

Scores and results list Costa Rica's goal tally first, score column indicates score after each Campbell goal.

List of international goals scored by Joel Campbell
No.	Date	Venue	Opponent	Score	Result	Competition
1	5 June 2011	Cowboys Stadium, Arlington, United States	Cuba	5–0	5–0	2011 CONCACAF Gold Cup
2	7 July 2011	Estadio 23 de Agosto, Jujuy, Argentina	Bolivia	2–0	2–0	2011 Copa América
3	15 November 2011	Estadio Nacional, San José, Costa Rica	Spain	2–0	2–2	Friendly
4	29 February 2012	Millennium Stadium, Cardiff, Wales	Wales	1–0	1–0	Friendly
5	8 June 2012	Estadio Nacional, San José, Costa Rica	El Salvador	2–0	2–2	2014 FIFA World Cup qualification
6	12 June 2012	Providence Stadium, Providence, Guyana	Guyana	4–0	4–0	2014 FIFA World Cup qualification
7	14 November 2012	Estadio Ramón Tahuichi Aguilera, Santa Cruz de la Sierra, Bolivia	Bolivia	1–0	1–1	Friendly
8	6 September 2013	Estadio Nacional, San José, Costa Rica	United States	3–1	3–1	2014 FIFA World Cup qualification
9	5 March 2014	Estadio Nacional, San José, Costa Rica	Paraguay	1–0	2–1	Friendly
10	14 June 2014	Estádio Castelão, Fortaleza, Brazil	Uruguay	1–1	3–1	2014 FIFA World Cup
11	13 October 2015	Red Bull Arena, Harrison, United States	United States	1–0	1–0	Friendly
12	8 October 2016	Krasnodar Stadium, Krasnodar, Russia	Russia	4–3	4–3	Friendly
13	15 November 2016	Estadio Nacional, San José, Costa Rica	United States	3–0	4–0	2018 FIFA World Cup qualification
14	15 November 2016	Estadio Nacional, San José, Costa Rica	United States	4–0	4–0	2018 FIFA World Cup qualification
15	3 June 2018	Estadio Nacional, San José, Costa Rica	Northern Ireland	2–0	3–0	Friendly
16	11 October 2018	Estadio Universitario, San Nicolás de los Garza, Mexico	Mexico	1–0	2–3	Friendly
17	20 November 2018	Estadio Monumental Virgen de Chapi, Arequipa, Peru	Peru	3–2	3–2	Friendly
18	13 November 2020	BSFZ-Arena, Maria Enzersdorf, Austria	Qatar	1–1	1–1	Friendly
19	6 June 2021	Empower Field at Mile High, Denver, United States	Honduras	1–0	2–2	2021 CONCACAF Nations League Finals
20	12 July 2021	Exploria Stadium, Orlando, United States	Guadeloupe	1–0	3–1	2021 CONCACAF Gold Cup
21	16 July 2021	Exploria Stadium, Orlando, United States	Suriname	1–1	2–1	2021 CONCACAF Gold Cup
22	2 February 2022	Independence Park, Kingston, Jamaica	Jamaica	1–0	1–0	2022 FIFA World Cup qualification
23	27 March 2022	Estadio Cuscatlán, San Salvador, El Salvador	El Salvador	2–1	2–1	2022 FIFA World Cup qualification
24	5 June 2022	Estadio Nacional, San José, Costa Rica	Martinique	1–0	2–0	2022–23 CONCACAF Nations League A
25	14 June 2022	Ahmad bin Ali Stadium, Al Rayyan, Qatar	New Zealand	1–0	1–0	2022 FIFA World Cup qualification
26	20 June 2023	Subaru Park, Chester, United States	Ecuador	1–2	1–3	Friendly
27	4 July 2023	Red Bull Arena, Harrison, United States	Martinique	4–1	6–4	2023 CONCACAF Gold Cup

== Honours ==
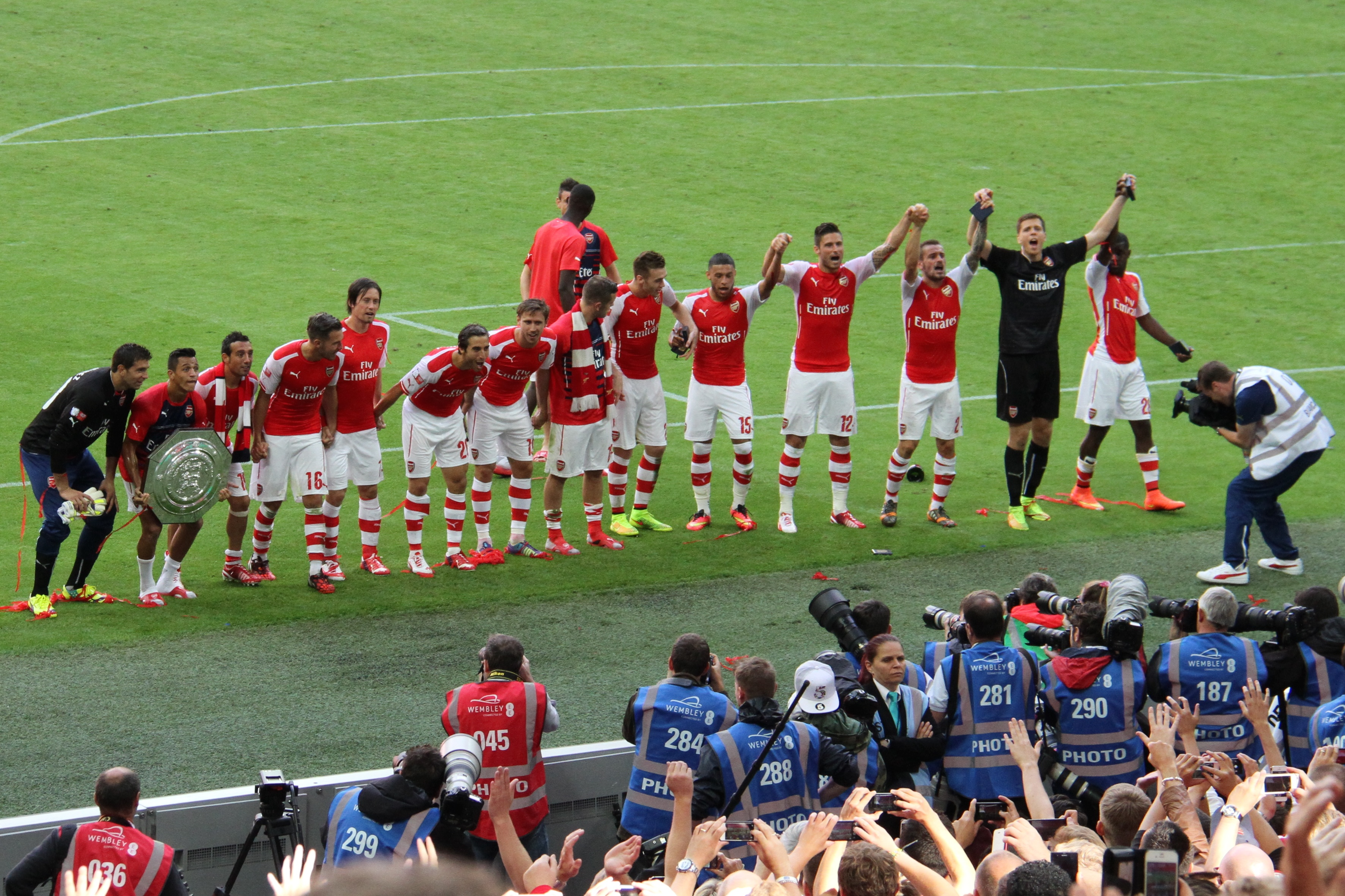
Campbell (far right) celebrating with his Arsenal teammates after winning the 2014 FA Community Shield

Olympiacos

- Super League Greece: 2013–14

Arsenal

- FA Community Shield: 2014

León

- Liga MX: Guardianes 2020
- CONCACAF Champions League: 2023

Alajuelense

- CONCACAF Central American Cup: 2023

Costa Rica

- Copa Centroamericana: 2014

Individual

- CONCACAF U-20 Championship Top scorer: 2011
- Super League Greece Team of the Season: 2013–14
- CONCACAF Best XI: 2015

== See also ==
- List of men's footballers with 100 or more international caps
