= Ipirá =

Municipality of Bahia State, Brazil

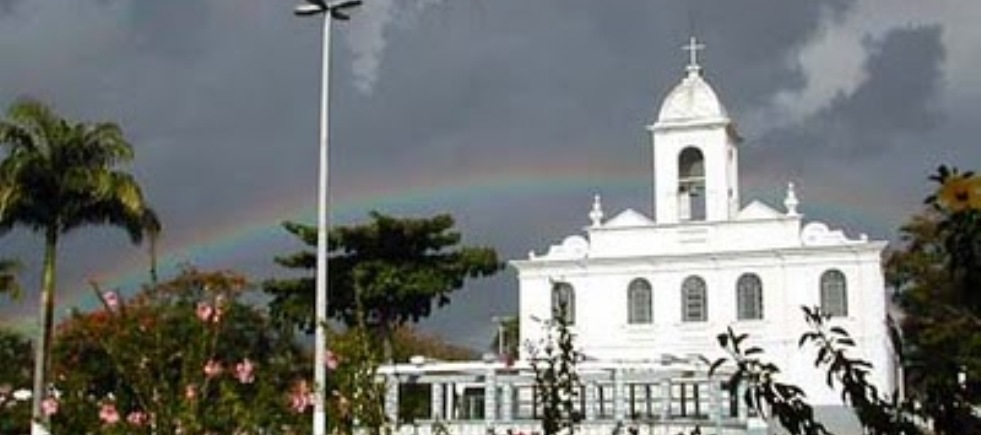

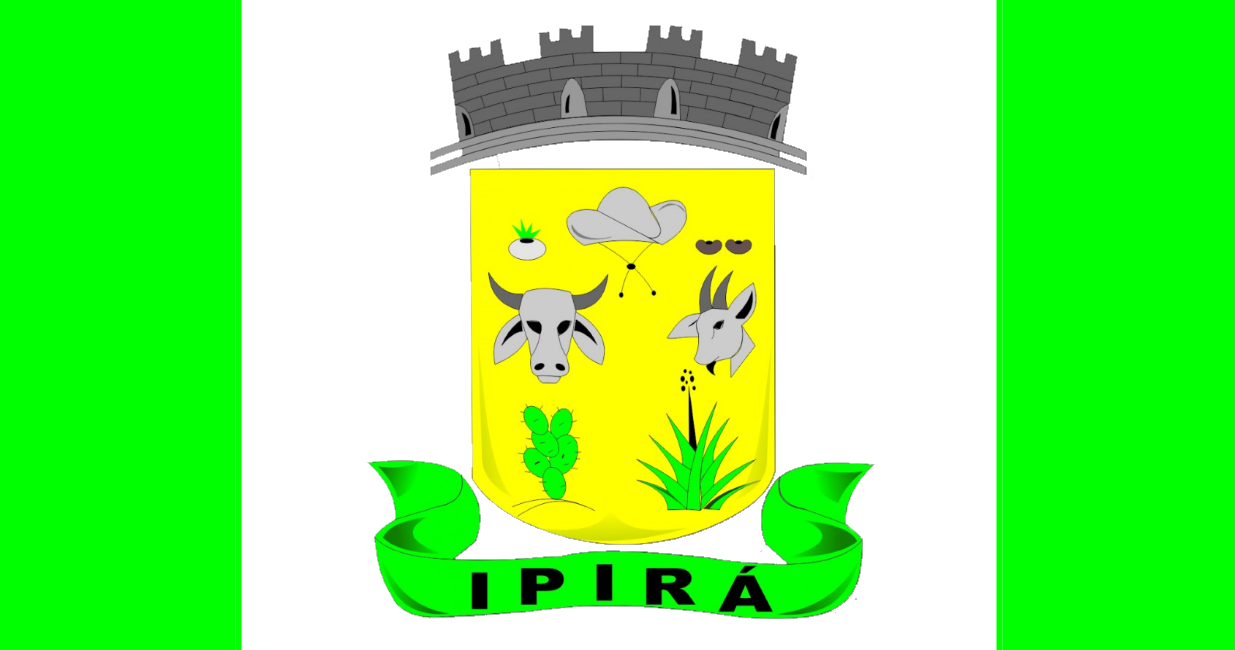
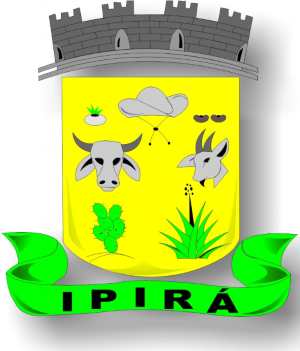
- Flag Coat of arms

- Coordinates: 12°09′30″S 39°44′20″W
- Region: Nordeste
- State: Bahia
- Country: Brazil
- Founded: 20 April 1855

Population (2020)
  - Total: 59,435
- Time zone: UTC−3 (BRT)
- Postal code: 44600-000

Ipirá is a municipality in Bahia, Brazil, with a population of 59,435. It was founded in 1855.

== Notable people ==
- Jaime Sodré - boxer who competed at the 1980 Summer Olympics
- José Carlos Santos da Silva - brazilian football player
- Marcos Vinícius, brazilian football player

== See also ==
- List of municipalities in Bahia
