= Estadio Brigadier General Estanislao López =

Football stadium in Santa Fe, Argentina

Coordinates: 31°39′47.58″S 60°43′31.42″W

Brigadier Estanislao López Stadium
- Estadio Brigadier Gral E. López
- "El Cementerio de Los Elefantes"
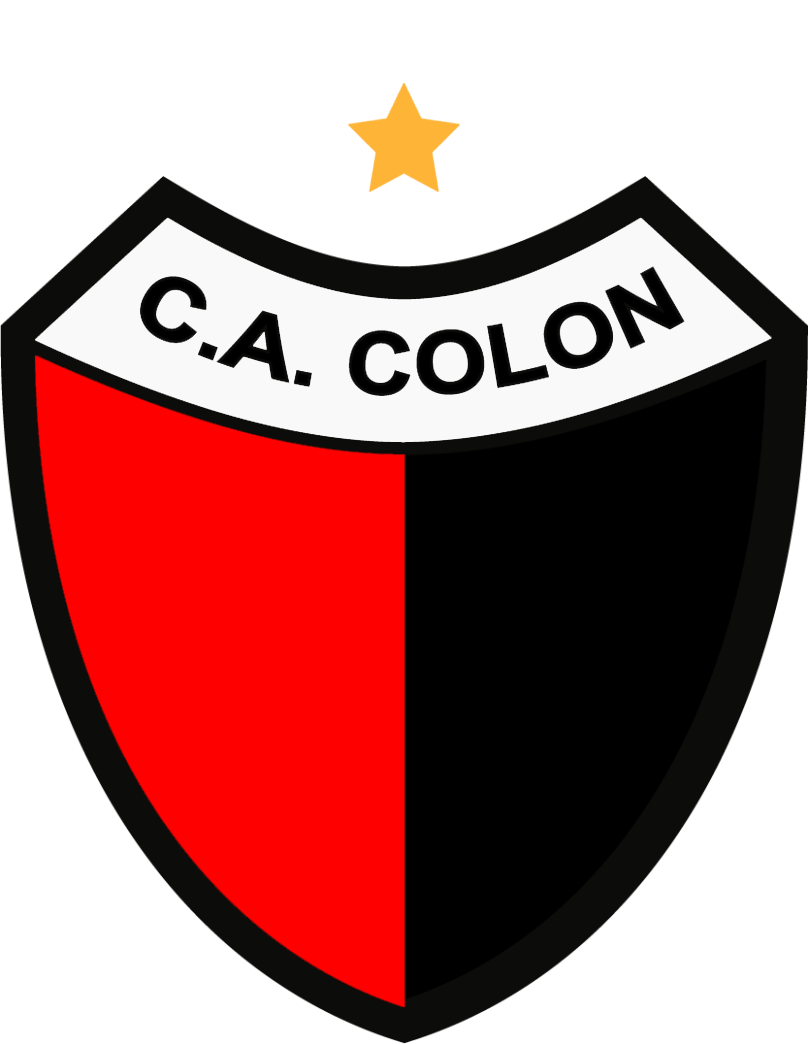

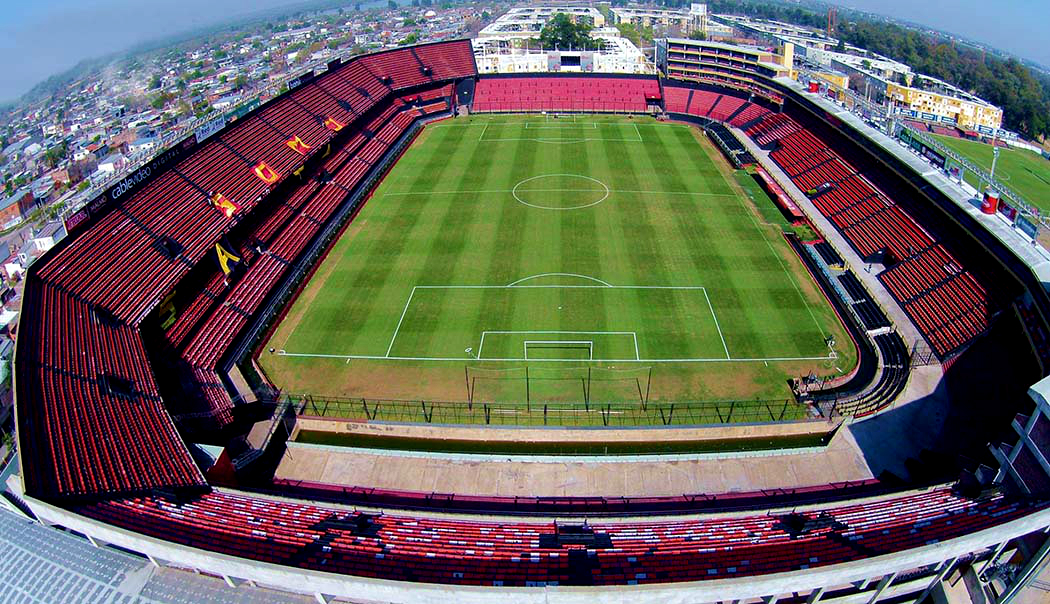
- Aerial view of the stadium in 2015
- Interactive map of Brigadier Estanislao López Stadium
- Full name: Estadio Brigadier General Estanislao López
- Former names: Estadio Eva Perón (1952–55); Estadio Centenario (1955–58)
- Address: Av. Juan J. Paso 3535; Santa Fe; Argentina
- Owner: Club Atlético Colón
- Capacity: 30,835

Construction
- Opened: 9 July 1946; 80 years ago

Tenants
- Colón (1946–present); Argentina national football team (2009–11); Argentina national rugby team (2007–17, 2024); Unión Santafesina de Rugby (1985)

Website
- clubcolon.com.ar/estadio

Brigadier General Estanislao López Stadium, popularly known as The Elephant Graveyard, is a football stadium in Santa Fe, Argentina. It was inaugurated in 1946 and is owned and operated by Club Atlético Colón, which is based there.

For a long time it has also been known as the Elephants Cemetery, (Note: Nickname attributed to Ángel José Gutiérrez, sports journalist for the newspaper El Litoral) due to Colón's wins over notable teams that visited Santa Fe. One of them was the famous Santos of Pelé who fell 2-1 in 1964. This Brazilian team had a record of 43 undefeated matches and was two-time Intercontinental champion at that time. The same Colón team later beat the Argentine team itself 2-0. Other teams that were defeated there were Peñarol in 1967, Millonarios, Olimpia, U de Chile, Alianza Lima, Atlético Mineiro, among others.

It currently has the capacity to hold 30,835 spectators, and the dimensions of the playing field are 105 x 70 m. It is entirely surrounded by concrete grandstands, including an upper tray on the north, east, and south sides, plus outfitted boxes on the northwest and southwest elbows.

The Argentina national football and rugby teams played some friendly and test matches at Estadio Brigadier López. It was also one of the venues of the 2011 Copa América.

== History ==
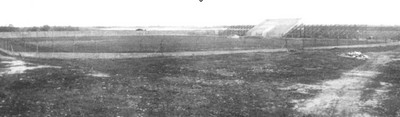
The stadium under construction

At the beginning, Colón played their home matches at a field, until in March 1938 the land was expropriated due to an unpaid debt so the club was evicted from that place. Because of that, Colón played its home games at the Gimnasia y Esgrima de Ciudadela Stadium and Estadio 15 de Abril. In 1939, C.A. Colón acquired a land to build a new stadium.

After some delays, the stadium was finally inaugurated on 9 July 1946, with a friendly match between Colón and Boca Juniors with an attendance of 10,000.

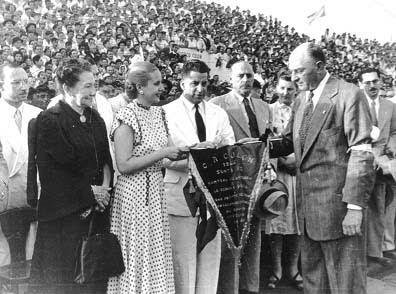
Eva Perón being honored by the club in 1947

On December 7, 1947, Eva Perón arrived in Santa Fe to inaugurate the Children's Hospital that bore her name. After that, he visited the Colón stadium and kicked off a classic from Santa Fe, of which the second half could not be completed because she took an hour to arrive due to the busy schedule and the stadium facilities still did not have lighting. On April 2, 1949, the lighting was finally inaugurated during the Colón 5–1 Huracán match, thanks to a subsidy of $150,000 provided by the National Government.

On September 18, 1950, the leaders of Colón managed to acquire a land adjoining the stadium, thanks to a loan of $750,000 granted by the National Government. The land itself was located in its southern sector, which, in the end, was acquired in cash for the sole purpose of continuing with the expansion of the stands. In 1952, the first section of cement on the west side was completed, which included 1,000 stalls. In this way, it increased its capacity to 20,000 people, becoming the one with the largest capacity in Santa Fe.

That same year the stadium was named "Eva Perón" who had supported Colón's affiliation to the Argentine Football Association in 1948. and later financially help the institution for the construction of the first cement grandstands and artificial lighting. However, after the coup d'état that overthrew Juan Domingo Perón, the names of the president and his wife were banned, so the stadium was renamed "Brigadier General Estanislao López" in honor of the Argentine caudillo who governed the province of Santa Fe between 1818 and 1838.

In 2008, the club signed a contract with Wide Entertainment to place a LED scoreboard in the stadium, at a cost of US dollar 500,000.

One year later, the AFA chose the Brigadier López Stadium as one of the venues for the 2011 Copa América hosted in Argentina. That same year, the stadium was refurbished and expanded. Works included new grandstands, scoreboards, press boxes, and a renovated lighting system. Further refurbishment included 3,500 new seats and the replacement of damaged ones.

== Sports events ==
=== Football ===
The stadium hosted the following matches of the 2011 Copa América:

Date	Group	Team #1	Res.	Team #2
3 July	Group B	Paraguay	0–0	Ecuador
6 July	Group A	Argentina	0–0	Colombia
10 July	Group A	Colombia	2–0	Bolivia
16 July	Quarter-finals	Argentina	1–1	Uruguay

=== Rugby union ===
==== Rugby U20 World Cup ====
In 2010 the stadium was one of the three venues of the World Rugby U-20 Championship. Some pool A and pool C matches and the playoffs were played at Colón Stadium.

Date	Round	Team 1	Score	Team 2
5 Jun	Pool A	Fiji	11–44	New Zealand
5 Jun	Pool A	New Zealand	77–7	Samoa
5 Jun	Pool C	Australia	58–13	Scotland
9 Jun	Pool C	South Africa	73–0	Scotland
13 Jun	Pool A	New Zealand	43–10	Wales
13 Jun	Pool C	South Africa	35–42	Australia
17 Jun	5th. place	Wales	19–19 (8–9 p)	Argentina
17 Jun	5th. place	France	44–9	Fiji
21 Jun	7th. place	Wales	39–15	Fiji

==== Other rugby matches ====
Date	Home team	Score	Away team	Competition	Ref.
25 Jun 1985	Santa Fe RU	7–82	France	France tour of South America	
26 May 2007	Argentina	22–20	Ireland	France tour of Argentina	
11 Jun 2016	Argentina	30–24	Italy	2016 tests	
17 Jun 2017	Argentina	25–35	England	England tour of Argentina	
7 Sep 2024	Argentina	67–27	Australia	2024 Rugby Championship	

== Concerts ==
Estadio Brigadier López has hosted several concerts of Argentine and international bands, such as:

Artist	Year
Los Piojos	1997
Patricio Rey y sus Redonditos de Ricota	1997
Teen Angels	2008
Joaquín Sabina	2010
Ricardo Arjona	2012

== See also ==
- List of football stadiums in Argentina
- Lists of stadiums

Preceded by various venues in Japan	World Rugby U-20; Venue; 2010	Succeeded by various venues in Italy
Preceded by (various venues in Venezuela)	Copa América; Venue; 2011	Succeeded by (various venues in Chile)
