= Damián Lizio =

Bolivian footballer (born 1989)

Personal information
- Full name: Damián Emmanuel Lizio
- Date of birth: 30 June 1989 (age 37)
- Place of birth: Florida, Argentina
- Height: 1.68 m (5 ft 6 in)
- Position: Attacking midfielder

Youth career
- 2004–2007: River Plate

Senior career*
Years	Team	Apps	(Gls)
2007–2010	River Plate	3	(0)
2009–2010	→ Córdoba (loan)	14	(0)
2010–2011	Anorthosis Famagusta	11	(2)
2011–2014	Bolívar	73	(10)
2013	→ Unión Santa Fe (loan)	16	(2)
2013	→ Al-Arabi (loan)	11	(4)
2014–2015	→ O'Higgins (loan)	27	(1)
2015–2016	Bolívar	15	(3)
2016–2017	Botafogo	0	(0)
2017–2018	Oriente Petrolero	30	(2)
2018–2019	Bolívar	13	(2)
2019–2020	Persebaya Surabaya	18	(4)
2020–2021	Royal Pari	21	(3)
2021–2022	Jorge Wilstermann	20	(3)
2022	Real Santa Cruz	29	(3)
2023	All Boys	10	(0)

International career
2009	Argentina U20	4	(0)
2014–2015	Bolivia	11	(1)
- * Club domestic league appearances and goals

Damián Emmanuel Lizio (born 30 June 1989) is a footballer who plays as an attacking midfielder. Born in Argentina, he represented the Bolivia national team.

== Club career ==
=== River Plate ===
Born in Florida, Buenos Aires, Lizio came through the youth ranks of River Plate, making his official debut on 10 November 2007 against Huracán in a 2–1 away loss, playing the entire game. His second appearance for the team was in a 2–0 defeat against Banfield on 8 December. The next season, Lizio won the 2008 Clausura Tournament under Diego Simeone. It was his first professional title, despite not making an appearance in the competition.

After a season, he had more chances to play when Néstor Gorosito took over. He made his first appearance under Gorosito in a 2–0 away victory over Independiente at the Estadio Monumental Antonio Vespucio Liberti. His second appearance was when he came off the bench in the 82nd minute in place of Cristian Fabbiani, playing only eight minutes in the match.

=== Al-Arabi ===
On 30 June 2013, Lizio signed for Al-Arabi. He left after 3 months with the club.

=== O'Higgins ===
In 2014, Lizio joined Chilean side O'Higgins for the 2014–15 season.

=== Persebaya Surabaya ===
On 20 February 2019, Lizio is signed by Persebaya Surabaya for the 2019 season. He signed a one-year contract with the club.

=== Royal Pari ===
In January 2020, Lizio returned to Bolivia and joined Royal Pari.

== International career ==
=== Argentina U-20 ===
In January 2009 Lizio was selected to join the Argentina under-20 squad for the 2009 South American Youth Championship in Venezuela.

=== Bolivia ===
In 2014, Lizio accepted to play for the Bolivian national team and made his debut in a non-unofficial FIFA friendly on 13 October against the Brazilian under-23s at Cuiabá, where he scored his side's goal in a 3–1 defeat. On 18 November 2014, he scored his first goal in a 3–2 friendly home win over Venezuela.

=== International goal ===
Score and result list Bolivia's goal tally first.

#	Date	Venue	Opponent	Score	Result	Competition
1.	18 November 2014	Estadio Hernando Siles, La Paz, Bolivia	Venezuela	2–1	3–2	Friendly

== Career statistics ==
=== Club ===
As of 16 January 2015

Club	Season	League			Copa Chile		Supercopa		Continental		Total	
Club	Season	Division	Apps	Goals	Apps	Goals	Apps	Goals	Apps	Goals	Apps	Goals
O'Higgins	2014–15	Primera División	27	1	4	2	—				20	3
Career total			27	1	4	2	0	0	0	0	31	3

== Honours ==
=== Club ===
River Plate

- Torneo Clausura (1): 2008

Bolívar

- Primera División (1): 2011

Al-Arabi

- Kuwait Federation Cup (1): 2013–14

Persebaya Surabaya

- Runner-up, Piala Presiden: 2019
