= Marcos Argüello =

Argentine footballer

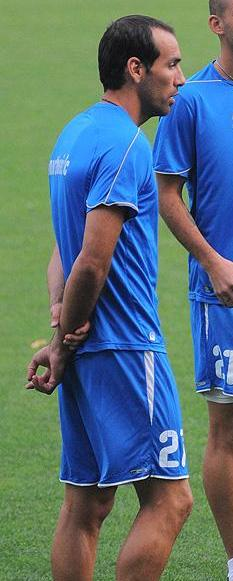

Personal information
- Full name: Marcos Ariel Argüello
- Date of birth: 28 July 1981 (age 45)
- Place of birth: Villa María, Córdoba, Argentina
- Height: 1.89 m (6 ft 2 1/2 in)
- Position: Goalkeeper

Team information
- Current team: Crucero del Norte

Senior career*
| Years | Team | Apps | (Gls) |
| 2000–2002 | Chacarita Juniors | 0 | (0) |
| 2003–2006 | Talleres de Córdoba | 14 | (0) |
| 2006 | Defensa y Justicia→ (loan) | 8 | (0) |
| 2007 | Guaraní → (loan) | 14 | (0) |
| 2008–2009 | General Paz Juniors | ? | (0) |
| 2009–2010 | Orihuela CF | 17 | (0) |
| 2010 | Anorthosis | 12 | (0) |
| 2011–2014 | Bolívar | 78 | (0) |
| 2014 | Textil Mandiyú | 13 | (0) |
| 2015–2016 | Oriente Petrolero | 45 | (0) |
| 2017 | Douglas Haig | 21 | (0) |
| 2017– | Crucero del Norte | 27 | (0) |
- * Club domestic league appearances and goals ‡ National team caps and goals as of 13:41, 23 September 2019 (UTC)

Marcos Argüello (born 28 July 1981 in Villa Maria, Córdoba) is an Argentinian football goalkeeper who plays for Crucero del Norte in the Torneo Federal A.

== Anorthosis Famagusta ==
In summer 2010 Marcos Argüello signed a contract with Anorthosis. In the beginning Marcos Argüello was the second goalkeeper in back of Matúš Kozáčik. Marcos Argüello make his debut against HNK Šibenik. Guillermo Ángel Hoyos put him in starting line up. Marcos Argüello was the main reason than Anorthosis was able to qualify for 4th Round of UEFA Europa League.

Later on, Marcos Argüello became permanent member of the team's starting 11. He became famous for his jump attempts repelling every attempt of opposite forwards. Furthermore, his great goalkeeping abilities did not allow to Anorthosis to keep him for long because of the interest that some greater in value and qualification clubs offered.
