= Diego Salvatierra =

Argentine footballer

Diego Esteban Salvatierra Mercado (born 11 April 1980) is an Argentine former professional footballer who played as a centre-back.

== Career ==
- Gimnasia y Tiro 2001–2004
- Atlético Ñuñorco 2004
- Gimnasia y Tiro 2005
- Sportivo Belgrano 2005–2006
- Bolívar 2007
- 2 de Mayo 2007
- Nacional Potosí 2008
- Aurora 2009
- Real Potosí 2010–2011
- Club Atlético Sarmiento (La Banda) 2012
- Sportivo Belgrano 2012–2013
- Villa Cubas de Catamarca 2013
- Camioneros Argentinos del Norte 2014
- Central Norte 2015
- Altos Hornos Zapla 2016
