= Edemir Rodríguez =

Bolivian footballer (born 1984)

Personal information
- Full name: Edemir Rodríguez Mercado
- Date of birth: October 21, 1984 (age 42)
- Place of birth: Santa Cruz de la Sierra, Bolivia
- Height: 1.75 m (5 ft 9 in)
- Position: Right back

Team information
- Current team: Oriente Petrolero
- Number: 2

Senior career*
Years	Team	Apps	(Gls)
2004–2010	Real Potosí	194	(10)
2011–2012	Bolívar	43	(5)
2012–2013	FK Baku	17	(2)
2013–2018	Bolívar	141	(7)
2019	San José	43	(5)
2020–2021	Always Ready	32	(7)
2022	Wilsteramnnn	33	(0)
2023	Real Santa Cruz	14	(0)
2024–	Oriente Petrolero	17	(0)

International career
2006–2016	Bolivia	23	(0)
- * Club domestic league appearances and goals as of 16:20, 9 May 2020 (UTC)

Edemir Rodríguez Mercado (born October 21, 1984, in Santa Cruz de la Sierra) is a Bolivian football defender who plays for Oriente Petrolero. He is right footed.

== Career ==
In June 2012, Rodriguez joined FC Baku in the Azerbaijan Premier League.

Rodríguez has been capped for the Bolivia national team 4 times.

== Career statistics ==
=== Club ===
As of match played 24 December 2016

Appearances and goals by club, season and competition
Club	Season	League			National Cup		Continental		Total	
Club	Season	Division	Apps	Goals	Apps	Goals	Apps	Goals	Apps	Goals
Club Bolívar	2011	Liga de Fútbol Profesional Boliviano	19	2			2	0	21	2
Club Bolívar	2011-12	Liga de Fútbol Profesional Boliviano	23	3			8	1	31	4
Club Bolívar	Total		42	5			10	1	52	6
FK Baku	2012–13	Azerbaijan Premier League	17	2	3	0	2	0	22	2
Club Bolívar	2013-14	Liga de Fútbol Profesional Boliviano	23	0	-		2	0	25	0
Club Bolívar	2014-15	Liga de Fútbol Profesional Boliviano	12	0	-		-		12	0
Club Bolívar	2015-16	Liga de Fútbol Profesional Boliviano	25	1	-		3	0	28	1
Club Bolívar	2016-17	Liga de Fútbol Profesional Boliviano	12	0	-		2	0	14	0
Club Bolívar	Total		72	1	-	-	8	0	80	1
Career total			131	8	3	0	20	1	154	9

=== International ===
Bolivia national team
Year	Apps	Goals
2007	2	0
2008	2	0
2009	4	0
2010	2	0
2011	2	0
2012	3	0
2013	3	0
2014	1	0
2015	2	0
2016	5	0
Total	23	0

Statistics accurate as of match played 10 November 2016

== Honours ==
Club Bolívar

- Liga de Fútbol Profesional Boliviano: 2011
