= Damir Miranda =

Bolivian footballer (born 1985)

Personal information
- Full name: Damir Miranda Mercado
- Date of birth: 26 October 1985 (age 41)
- Place of birth: Santa Cruz de la Sierra, Bolivia
- Height: 1.73 m (5 ft 8 in)
- Position: Central midfielder

Team information
- Current team: Always Ready

Senior career*
Years	Team	Apps	(Gls)
2005–2008	Destroyers	71	(5)
2009–2010	San José	54	(6)
2011–2016	Bolívar	179	(20)
2016–2017	San José	20	(1)
2017–2018	Sport Boys	36	(1)
2019–	Always Ready	2	(0)

International career
2014–2015	Bolivia	6	(0)
- * Club domestic league appearances and goals as of 29 January 2019

Damir Miranda Mercado (born 26 October 1985) is a Bolivian footballer who plays for Always Ready as a central midfielder.

== Honours ==
Potosí

- Bolivian First Division (1): 2007

Bolívar

- Bolivian First Division (2): 2011, 2013
