= Ronald García =

Bolivian footballer (born 1980)

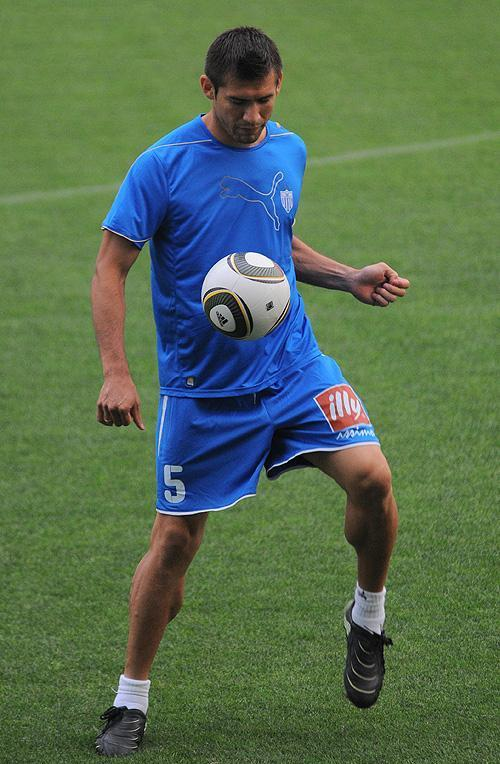
- García in August 2010

Personal information
- Full name: Ronald Lázaro García Justiniano
- Date of birth: 17 December 1980 (age 45)
- Place of birth: Santa Cruz de la Sierra, Bolivia
- Height: 1.84 m (6 ft 0 in)
- Position: Midfielder

Youth career
- Tahuichi Academy

Senior career*
Years	Team	Apps	(Gls)
1998–2001	Bolívar	72	(9)
2001–2004	Alverca	55	(5)
2004–2005	Bolívar	14	(3)
2005–2012	Aris	90	(6)
2010	→ Anorthosis (loan)	14	(0)
2010–2011	→ Bolívar (loan)	16	(0)
2012–2015	Oriente Petrolero	51	(2)

International career^{‡}
2002–2013	Bolivia	48	(2)
- * Club domestic league appearances and goals as of 4 April 2015 ‡ National team caps and goals as of 10 September 2009

Ronald Lázaro García Justiniano, nicknamed "Nacho" (born 17 December 1980) is a Bolivian former footballer who played as a midfielder. He currently holds the position of Sports Director at Bolivian club Oriente Petrolero.

He "graduated" from Bolivia's famous football academy Tahuichi Aguilera located in Santa Cruz, which produced some popular Bolivian football stars, including Erwin "Platiní" Sanchez, Marco Antonio "El Diablo" Etcheverry and Jaime Moreno among others.

== Club career ==
=== Pre-Aris career ===
García's first professional Bolivian club was Bolívar from La Paz. From there, he moved to Alverca in Portugal. He played for 3 years there and 2 stories about him are interesting: First, at some point in his younger age, he was considered and positioned in the top 50 of world's football potentials. Second, the story with him is related to his days in Benfica.

After his days in Portugal he returned once again to play in Bolivia. During his second spell at Bolívar he reached the quarter-finals of the Copa Libertadores, only to be defeated by Club América on 25 May 2000. His notable performances earned him a second chance at his European dream, allowing him to sign for Aris, which at the time was in the second division. (apparent fee was 100,000 euros).

=== Aris ===
Ronald Gacia was affected by a number of problems during his first season at Aris. First, his adapting process lasted longer than expected. Second, he suffered from injuries and his longer recoveries made it difficult for him to become a regular starter. Towards the end of the second division season he gradually started to gain confidence and trust from his coach Nikos Anastopoulos. As a result of a strong campaign from Aris, Nacho along with Aris were promoted to the first division after just 1 year.

In the big "roster sweep" of summer 2006, Aris Management gave him another chance and left him in the team for the 2006–2007 season. The first part of the season was more or less successful. However, his career continued to be hampered by injuries. He was a regular starter under Guillermo Hoyos, the first coach to rebuild 2006/07 Aris. However, he lost his starting 11 place to Ruben Palazuelos under Enrique Hernandez (Hoyos' successor).

In mid-August 2008, after a lengthy series of negotiations, García finally signed a 5-year contract extension (up to 2013), earning 2 million euros, in total, for 5 years.

After a year he returned to Aris with less money in September 2011. His first unofficial appearance with the black and yellow shirt was in the friendly against Doxa Dramas on September 4, in which he had a notable performance. García is the club's longest-serving non-Greek player in club history.

=== Post-Aris career ===
In July 2010 he was loaned out to Cypriot club Anorthosis Famagusta F.C., and later that year he returned to Bolívar for a third spell. After his contract expired with Aris, García was signed by hometown club Oriente Petrolero in June 2012. A series of troublesome injuries forced him to retire from professional football in May 2015.

== International career ==
During his first season in Aris, Nacho came close to being part of the Bolivia national team and its starting 11. In 2007, he obtained his first cap by the Bolivia National team, playing for Copa America 2007 (equivalent to the Euro Cup). In the 2007–2008 season, he solidified his spot in the Bolivia national team.

In the September round of the World Cup qualifiers for South Africa 2010, he led his national team to a historic 0:0 draw against Brazil, being one of the best players on the pitch.. A month later, he helped his national team improve their qualifying group position by scoring a goal in a 3:0 win over Peru at home and in the match with Uruguay (2:2) three days later. Half a year later (on 1 April), Nacho was involved in another historic result for his country as Bolivia beat Argentina 6:1, in La Paz, notching an assist on his match stats account. Between 2002 and 2013, García earned a total of 48 caps for the national team and scored 2 goals. He represented his country in 28 FIFA World Cup qualification matches.

== Career statistics ==
Appearances and goals by national team and year
National team	Year	Apps	Goals
Bolivia	2000	9	0
Bolivia	2001	2	0
Bolivia	2003	2	0
Bolivia	2004	2	0
Bolivia	2005	3	0
Bolivia	2007	9	0
Bolivia	2008	6	2
Bolivia	2009	5	0
Bolivia	2010	1	0
Bolivia	2011	5	0
Bolivia	2013	3	0
Total		48	2

Scores and results list Bolivia's goal tally first, score column indicates score after each García goal.

List of international goals scored by Ronald García
No.	Date	Venue	Opponent	Score	Result	Competition	Ref.
1	18 June 2008	Estadio Hernando Siles, La Paz, Bolivia	Paraguay	2–0	4–2	2010 FIFA World Cup qualification	
2	11 October 2008	Estadio Hernando Siles, La Paz, Bolivia	Peru	3–0	3–0	2010 FIFA World Cup qualification	
