= Pablo Frontini =

Argentine footballer and coach

Palo Frontini
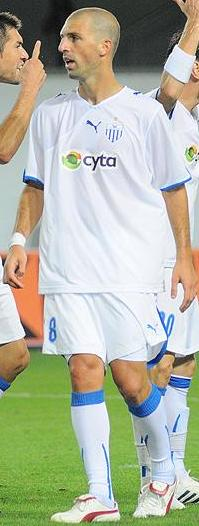

Personal information
- Full name: Pablo Javier Frontini
- Date of birth: 3 May 1984 (age 42)
- Place of birth: Buenos Aires, Argentina
- Height: 1.83 m (6 ft 0 in)
- Position: Defender

Team information
- Current team: Ferro Carril Oeste (manager)

Senior career*
Years	Team	Apps	(Gls)
2003–2005	River Plate	3	(0)
2006	Instituto de Córdoba	15	(1)
2006–2007	Gimnasia de Jujuy	25	(1)
2007–2008	San Martín SJ	31	(3)
2008–2009	Instituto de Córdoba	28	(1)
2009–2010	Defensa y Justicia	36	(2)
2010	Anorthosis Famagusta	11	(2)
2011–2012	Bolivar	38	(1)
2012–2013	Once Caldas	16	(0)
2013–2014	Instituto de Córdoba	68	(5)
2014–2016	Ferro Carril Oeste	26	(2)
2016–2018	All Boys	54	(2)
2019	San Telmo	37	(0)

Managerial career
- 2020–2021: San Telmo
- 2022: Defensores de Belgrano
- 2023–2025: All Boys
- 2025-: Club Ferro Carril Oeste
- * Club domestic league appearances and goals

Pablo Javier Frontini (born 3 May 1984 in Buenos Aires) is an Argentine football coach and former player who played as a defender. He is the current manager of All Boys.

== Career ==
=== Club career ===
Frontini started his playing career with River Plate in 2003, he only made three league appearances for the club before joining Instituto de Córdoba in 2006. He then had a season with Gimnasia de Jujuy before joining San Martín de San Juan in 2007. In July 2010 he signed a contract with Anorthosis Famagusta.

=== Coaching career ===
Retiring at the end of 2019, Frontini was appointed head coach of his last club, Club Atlético San Telmo, on 4 January 2020. He went on to coach Defensores de Belgrano and All Boys before being named head coach of Ferro Carril Oeste in December 2025.

== Statistics ==
As of 28 September 2010.

Team	Season	Domestic League		Marfin Laiki Cup		European Competition^{1}		Other Tournaments^{2}		Total	
Team	Season	Apps	Goals	Apps	Goals	Apps	Goals	Apps	Goals	Apps	Goals
Anorthosis Famagusta	2010–2011	11	2	0	0	0	0	–		11	2
European Career Total		11	2	0	0	0	0	0	0	11	2
