= Ronald Eguino =

Bolivian footballer (born 1988)

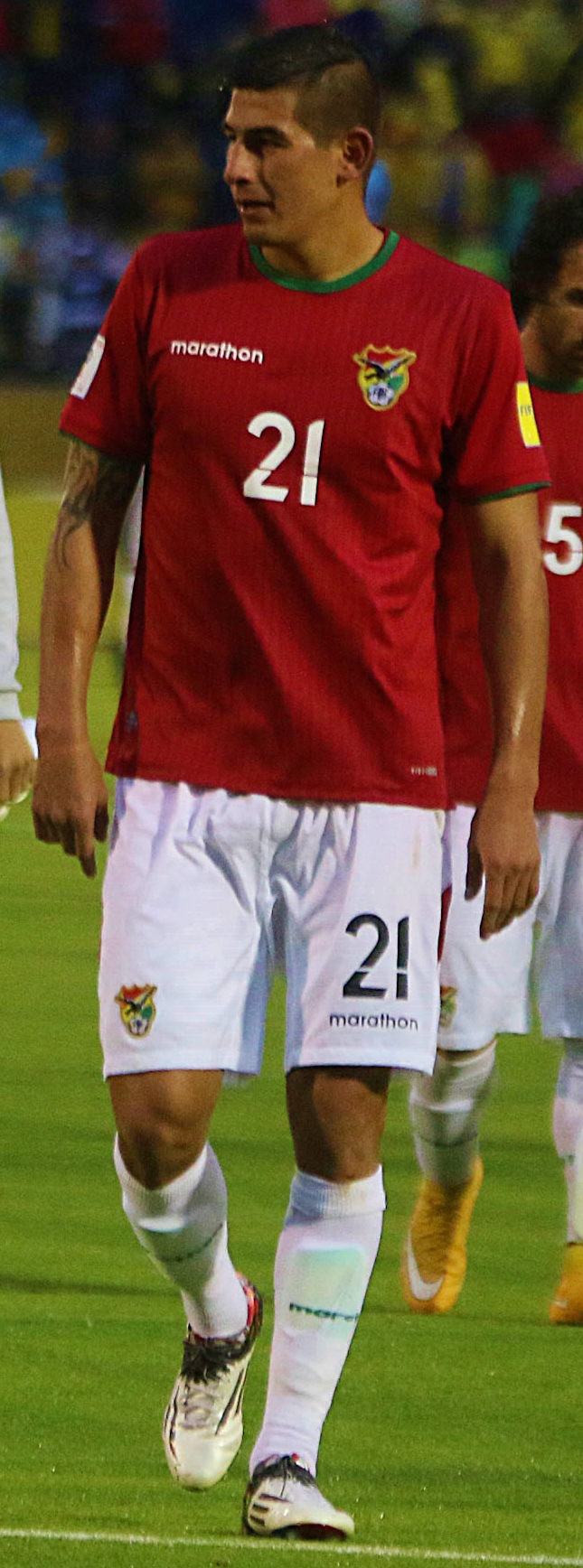

Personal information
- Full name: Ronald Eguino Segovia
- Date of birth: 20 February 1988 (age 38)
- Place of birth: Sacaba, Bolivia
- Height: 1.83 m (6 ft 0 in)
- Position: Centre back

Senior career*
Years	Team	Apps	(Gls)
2007–2010	Real Potosí	106	(4)
2011–2018	Bolívar	210	(9)
2019	San José	6	(0)
2020–2021	Real Potosí	41	(1)
2022	Mojocoya FC	0	(0)

International career
2010–2016	Bolivia	18	(0)
- * Club domestic league appearances and goals as of 21:15, 24 May 2020 (UTC)

Ronald Eguino Segovia (born 20 February 1988) is a Bolivian former footballer who played as a centre back.

== International career ==
Eguino played his first international game with the senior national team on 24 February 2010 in and against Mexico (5–0), where he was part of the starting squad and played the entire match. He represented his country in 6 FIFA World Cup qualification matches. as of June 2016.

== Honours ==
Potosí

- Bolivian First Division (1): 2007

Bolívar

- Bolivian First Division (2): 2011, 2013
