= William Ferreira =

Uruguayan footballer (born 1983)

Personal information
- Full name: William Ferreira Martínez
- Date of birth: February 25, 1983 (age 43)
- Place of birth: Artigas, Uruguay
- Height: 1.76 m (5 ft 9 in)
- Position: Striker

Team information
- Current team: Bolívar
- Number: 8

Senior career*
Years	Team	Apps	(Gls)
2002–2004	Nacional	24	(1)
2005–2006	Fénix	38	(13)
2006–2007	Rampla Juniors	26	(6)
2007	Fénix	10	(5)
2008	Defensor Sporting	27	(9)
2009–2012	Bolívar	129	(82)
2012	→ Liverpool Montevideo (loan)	14	(4)
2013–2014	Bolívar	62	(45)
2014	U. de G.	16	(1)
2015	Independiente del Valle	16	(1)
2015–2018	Bolívar	14	(7)
2019	Club Always Ready	21	(13)
- * Club domestic league appearances and goals as of December 6, 2019

William Ferreira Martínez (born February 25, 1983, in Artigas) is a Uruguayan football striker. He currently plays for Club Always Ready in the Primera División de Bolivia.

== Career ==
Ferreira began his footballing career with Uruguayan giant Nacional, where he was part of a national title in 2002. After two more years with the tricolor, he transferred to Fénix. In 2006 Ferreira joined Rampla Juniors, but returned to Fénix the following season. In 2008, he played for Defensor Sporting, which won the national league title that year. In 2009, he moved to Bolivia and signed for Bolívar. During the Apertura tournament Ferreira had the best season of his career yet. His presence was fundamental as he scored 16 goals in 21 games; becoming the league top scorer and helping the club in adding another championship trophy to its showcase. In the Clausura 2009, he also finished in the top of the list with 9 goals, and netted 4 more in the playoffs stage, totalling 29 for the year. On 31 January 2011 makes official its assignment with option to buy the Spanish club Real Valladolid of Spanish football but FIFA rejected the international transfer after the TAS rejected the interim suspension as the player returned to Bolívar until further notice.

== Club titles ==
Season	Club	Title
2002	Nacional	Primera División Uruguaya
2008	Defensor Sporting	Primera División Uruguaya
2009 (A)	Bolívar	Liga de Fútbol Profesional Boliviano
2011 (AD)	Bolívar	Liga de Fútbol Profesional Boliviano

== Honours ==
Season	Club	Title
2009 Apertura	Bolívar	Liga de Fútbol Profesional Boliviano top scorer: 16 goals
2009 Clausura	Bolívar	Liga de Fútbol Profesional Boliviano top scorer: 9 goals
2010 Clausura	Bolívar	Liga de Fútbol Profesional Boliviano top scorer: 14 goals
2011-12 Season	Bolívar	Liga de Fútbol Profesional Boliviano top scorer: 22 goals
