= Zé Carlos (footballer, born 1975) =

Brazilian footballer

Personal information
- Full name: José Carlos Santos Silva
- Date of birth: 19 March 1975 (age 51)
- Place of birth: Ipirá, Brazil
- Height: 1.75 m (5 ft 9 in)
- Position: Forward

Senior career*
Years	Team	Apps	(Gls)
1995	Goianiense		
1996–2001	Botafogo	53	(7)
2001	→ Guarani (loan)	3	(0)
2002	Malatyaspor	6	(1)
2003	Flamengo	47	(12)
2004	Pohang Steelers	14	(5)
2005	Juventude	17	(10)
2006	Marítimo	16	(7)
2006–2007	Braga	24	(7)
2007–2008	APOEL	19	(7)
2008	Trofense	5	(0)
2009	Veria	8	(1)
2009	Juventude	13	(1)
2010–2012	Bolívar	41	(21)
2012	→ Botafogo-DF (loan)		
2012	Ceilândia	7	(2)
2013	Olaria	4	(1)
2014–2015	Barra da Tijuca		
- * Club domestic league appearances and goals

José Carlos Santos da Silva (born 19 March 1975), known as Zé Carlos, is a Brazilian retired footballer who played as a forward.

His own included, he played professionally in six countries.

== Football career ==
Born in Ipirá, Bahia, Zé Carlos received the nickname Zé do Gol (Zé of the Goal) while playing at Botafogo de Futebol e Regatas. There, he was champion of the 1997 Campeonato Carioca and the Torneio Rio – São Paulo in the following year. In January 2002 he left for Turkish club Malatyaspor and, the next year, moved back to Brazil, for Clube de Regatas do Flamengo also in Rio de Janeiro.

In January 2004, Zé Carlos joined South Korea's Pohang Steelers. The following year in the same month he moved again, penning a one-year deal with Esporte Clube Juventude.

Zé Carlos spent the next one-and-a-half seasons in Portugal, with C.S. Marítimo and S.C. Braga, helping the Minho side finish fourth in 2006–07 and qualify for the UEFA Cup. He was also an essential attacking unit in their semi-final run in the Taça de Portugal, notably scoring a hat-trick in a 5–2 home win against Portimonense SC.

On 12 July 2007, Zé Carlos signed a contract with APOEL FC in Cyprus. He experienced some trouble with injuries during his stay, but helped his team win the domestic cup.

In 2011, 34-year-old Zé Carlos helped Club Bolívar conquer the Bolivian League, scoring ten goals. He subsequently returned to his country, playing exclusively in amateur football.

== Honours ==
Botafogo

- Campeonato Carioca: 1997

APOEL

- Cypriot Cup: 2007–08

Bolívar

- Liga de Fútbol Profesional Boliviano: 2011
