= Ronald Rivero =

Bolivian footballer (born 1980)

Personal information
- Full name: Ronald Tylor Rivero Kuhn
- Date of birth: January 29, 1980 (age 46)
- Place of birth: Santa Cruz de la Sierra, Bolivia
- Height: 1.83 m (6 ft 0 in)
- Position: Defender

Team information
- Current team: Real Potosí
- Number: 5

Senior career*
Years	Team	Apps	(Gls)
2006–2011	Universitario	91	(3)
2010–2011	→ Bolívar (loan)	60	(2)
2011	Shenzhen Ruby	14	(0)
2012	Blooming	29	(0)
2013	Sport Boys Warnes	35	(0)
2014–2016	Real Potosí	37	(0)

International career^{‡}
2008–2012	Bolivia	29	(0)
- * Club domestic league appearances and goals as of January 14, 2012 ‡ National team caps and goals as of November 10, 2011

Ronald Tylor Rivero Kuhn (Spanish pronunciation: [ˈronal(d) riˈβeɾo]; born 29 January 1980 in Santa Cruz de la Sierra) is a Bolivian football central defender who currently plays for Real Potosí in the Liga de Fútbol Profesional Boliviano.

Rivero has earned 29 caps for the Bolivia national team since his debut in 2008.
