= Rudy Cardozo =

Bolivian footballer (born 1990)

Personal information
- Full name: Rudy Alejandro Cardozo Fernández
- Date of birth: 14 February 1990 (age 36)
- Place of birth: Tarija, Bolivia
- Height: 1.71 m (5 ft 7 1/2 in)
- Position: Attacking midfielder

Team information
- Current team: Independiente Petrolero
- Number: 7

Youth career
- 2008: Bolívar

Senior career*
Years	Team	Apps	(Gls)
2008–2009	Ironi Ramat HaSharon	28	(1)
2009–2017	Bolívar	213	(40)
2015	→ Portuguesa (loan)	6	(0)
2017	Wilstermann	40	(10)
2018–2021	The Strongest	113	(15)
2022	Royal Pari	22	(5)
2023–2024	Wilstermann	48	(6)
2025–	Independiente Petrolero	28	(3)

International career^{‡}
2007	Bolivia U17		
2009	Bolivia U20	2	(0)
2010–	Bolivia	45	(6)
- * Club domestic league appearances and goals as of 30 December 2025 ‡ National team caps and goals as of 01:50, 3 January 2021 (UTC)

Rudy Alejandro Cardozo Fernández (born 14 February 1990) is a Bolivian footballer who plays for Independiente Petrolero and the Bolivia national team as a midfielder.

== Club career ==
=== Early career ===
Born in Tarija, Cardozo was a Club Bolívar youth graduate. In the 2008 summer he moved to Israel second division side Ironi Ramat HaSharon, making his senior debuts for the latter in the campaign.

=== Bolívar ===
In July 2009 Cardozo returned to Bolívar, but only appeared rarely for the club during his first year. On 17 May 2010 he scored his first goals, netting a brace in a 2–2 draw against Aurora.

Cardozo was an undisputed starter in 2010 appearing in 47 matches and scoring nine goals. He was also a part of the squad in the 2011 and 2012–13 winning campaigns, always as a first-choice.

In August 2012 Cardozo was due to join Russian Premier League's FC Alania Vladikavkaz, but the deal collapsed. On 22 October 2014, after scoring in a 6–1 home routing over Club Deportivo San José, he harassed Bolívar's assistant manager Vladimir Soria, and was later suspended by the club.

On 13 January 2015 Cardozo moved to Associação Portuguesa de Desportos, for six months.

== International career ==
Cardozo represented the Bolivia under-20 side at the 2009 South American Youth Championship, appearing in a 1–4 loss against Paraguay and a 1–5 loss to Brazil as Bolivia finished last in their group.

Cardozo made his debut for the main squad on 11 August 2010, starting in a 1–1 friendly draw against Colombia. He was also named in Gustavo Quinteros' 23-man squad for 2011 Copa America, but appeared in only one match in the competition.

Cardozo scored his first international goal on 2 September of the following year, netting his side's second in 2–2 draw against Peru.

As of 1 June 2016, he has earned 37 caps, scoring 5 goals and represented his country in 17 FIFA World Cup qualification matches.

=== International goals ===
Scores and results list Bolivia's goal tally first.

No	Date	Venue	Opponent	Score	Result	Competition
1.	2 September 2011	Estadio Nacional de Lima, Lima, Peru	Peru	2–1	2–2	Friendly
2.	7 October 2011	Estadio Centenario, Montevideo, Uruguay	Uruguay	1–1	2–4	2014 FIFA World Cup qualification
3.	14 August 2013	Estadio Polideportivo de Pueblo Nuevo, San Cristóbal, Venezuela	Venezuela	1–1	2–2	Friendly
4.	6 June 2014	Red Bull Arena, Harrison, United States	Greece	1–2	1–2	Friendly
5.	12 November 2016	Estadio Hernando Siles, La Paz, Bolivia	Venezuela	4–1	3–2	2018 FIFA World Cup qualification
6.	16 October 2018	Azadi Stadium, Tehran, Iran	Iran	1–2	1–2	Friendly
