= Marcelo Gomes (footballer) =

Brazilian-Bolivian footballer (born 1981)

Personal information
- Full name: José Marcelo Gomes
- Date of birth: 24 November 1981 (age 44)
- Place of birth: Rio de Janeiro, Brazil
- Height: 1.69 m (5 ft 7 in)
- Position: Midfielder

Team information
- Current team: Independiente Petrolero
- Number: 20

Senior career*
Years	Team	Apps	(Gls)
2002–2004	Bonsucesso		
2004–2005	Union Central		
2006–2009	Universitario de Sucre	126	(30)
2009–2010	Aurora	45	(9)
2010–2011	Bolivar	5	(1)
2011–2012	Universitario de Sucre	39	(9)
2012–2014	San José	81	(37)
2014–2015	Wilstermann	0	(0)
2015–2017	Universitario de Sucre	81	(13)
2017–2020	San José	122	(22)
2021–	Independiente Petrolero	3	(0)
- * Club domestic league appearances and goals as of 16:53, 30 May 2021 (UTC)

José Marcelo Gomes (born 24 November 1981 in Rio de Janeiro, Brazil) is a Brazilian naturalized Bolivian footballer currently playing for Independiente Petrolero in the Liga de Futbol Profesional Boliviano.

== Club title ==
Season	Club	Title
2008 (C)	Universitario de Sucre	Liga de Fútbol Profesional Boliviano
