= Lorgio Álvarez =

Bolivian footballer (born 1978)

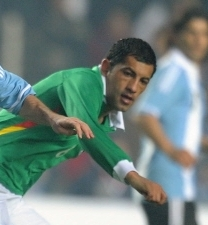

Personal information
- Full name: Lorgio Álvarez Roca
- Date of birth: June 29, 1978 (age 48)
- Place of birth: Santa Cruz de la Sierra, Bolivia
- Height: 1.77 m (5 ft 10 in)
- Positions: Left back; midfielder

Team information
- Current team: Blooming
- Number: 4

Youth career
- 1994–1995: Blooming

Senior career*
Years	Team	Apps	(Gls)
1995–2002	Blooming	182	(10)
2003–2004	Oriente Petrolero	76	(10)
2005	Cerro Porteño	9	(0)
2005–2006	Independiente	39	(1)
2007–2008	Cerro Porteño	32	(4)
2008–2009	Libertad	34	(3)
2009–2010	Blooming	49	(3)
2011–2015	Bolívar	129	(11)
2016–	Blooming	2	(0)

International career^{‡}
1999–2011	Bolivia	45	(1)
- * Club domestic league appearances and goals as of May 29, 2011 ‡ National team caps and goals as of June 4, 2011

Lorgio Álvarez Roca (born June 29, 1978, in Santa Cruz de la Sierra) is a Bolivian former footballer. He last played for Blooming in the Liga de Fútbol Profesional Boliviano.

His previous clubs include Oriente Petrolero and Bolívar in Bolivia, Club Atlético Independiente in Argentina, as well as Cerro Porteño and Libertad in Paraguay.

== International career ==
From 1999 to 2011 Álvarez earned a total of 45 caps in the Bolivia national team. He played in Copa América 2001, 2004 and 2007. He scored a spectacular goal in a match against Peru during the Copa América 2004.

== Career statistics ==
=== International ===
Appearances and goals by national team and year
National team	Year	Apps	Goals
Bolivia	1999	4	0
Bolivia	2000	1	0
Bolivia	2001	4	0
Bolivia	2003	3	0
Bolivia	2004	9	1
Bolivia	2005	5	0
Bolivia	2007	8	0
Bolivia	2008	2	0
Bolivia	2009	1	0
Bolivia	2011	8	0
Total		45	1

Scores and results list Bolivia's goal tally first, score column indicates score after each Álvarez goal.

List of international goals scored by Lorgio Álvarez
No.	Date	Venue	Opponent	Score	Result	Competition	Ref.
1	6 July 2004	Estadio Nacional, Lima, Peru	Peru	2–0	2–2	2004 Copa América	

== Honours ==
=== Club ===
- Blooming
  - Liga de Fútbol Profesional Boliviano: 1998, 1999, 2009 Clausura
- Cerro Porteño
  - Primera División de Paraguay: 2005
- Libertad
  - Primera División de Paraguay: 2008 (Apertura and Clausura)
- Bolívar
  - Liga de Fútbol Profesional Boliviano: 2011 AD, 2013 (C), 2014 (A) & 2015 (C)
