= 2011 Liga de Fútbol Profesional Boliviano =

Annual soccer tournament

Liga de Fútbol Profesional Boliviano
- Season: 2011
- Champions: Bolívar (17th title)
- Relegated: None
- 2012 Copa Libertadores: Bolívar; Real Potosí
- 2012 Copa Sudamericana: Oriente Petrolero
- Top goalscorer: Juan Maurade (19 goals)

The 2011 Liga de Fútbol Profesional Boliviano season (official known as the 2011 Campeonato ENTEL Fundadores de la LFPB for sponsorship reasons) was the 35th season of LFPB. Originally comprising two tournaments, the 2011 season was the first single-stage season since 2005. This was to change the calendar to European calendar like Argentina, Venezuela and Uruguay. The 2011 fixtures were released on January 7, 2011. The season began on January 15 ended on June 22. There was no relegation. Oriente Petrolero was the defending champion.

== Teams ==
The number of teams for 2011 remains the same. Jorge Wilstermann finished last in the 2010 relegation table and was relegated to the Bolivian Football Regional Leagues for the first time since the club was founded. They were replaced by the 2010 Copa Simón Bolívar champion Nacional Potosí, who last played in the LFPB in 2009.

Locations of the 2011 LFPB teams

Team	Home city	Home stadium	Manager
Aurora	Cochabamba	Félix Capriles	Julio Alberto Zamora
Blooming	Santa Cruz	Ramón Tahuichi Aguilera	Fernando Quiroz
Bolívar	La Paz	Hernando Siles	Guillermo Ángel Hoyos
Guabirá	Montero	Gilberto Parada	Claudio Marrupe
La Paz	La Paz	Hernando Siles	Freddy Bolívar
Nacional Potosí	Potosí	Víctor Agustín Ugarte	Luis Orozco
Oriente Petrolero	Santa Cruz	Ramón Tahuichi Aguilera	Ariel Cuffaro Russo
Real Mamoré	Trinidad	Estadio Gran Mamoré	Sergio Oscar Luna
Real Potosí	Potosí	Víctor Agustín Ugarte	Marco Ferrufino
San José	Oruro	Jesús Bermúdez	Marcelo Javier Zuleta
The Strongest	La Paz	Hernando Siles	Néstor Craviotto
Universitario de Sucre	Sucre	Olímpico Patria	Eduardo Villegas

== Standings ==
Pos	Team	Pld	W	D	L	GF	GA	GD	Pts	Qualification
1	Bolívar	22	11	7	4	32	24	+8	40	2012 Copa Libertadores Second Stage
2	Real Potosí	22	11	5	6	32	22	+10	38	2012 Copa Libertadores First Stage
3	Oriente Petrolero	22	11	3	8	46	25	+21	36	2012 Copa Sudamericana First Stage
4	The Strongest	22	10	5	7	33	26	+7	35	
5	Blooming	22	11	2	9	34	28	+6	35	
6	San José	22	10	4	8	29	27	+2	34	
7	Aurora	22	9	6	7	31	25	+6	33	
8	Universitario de Sucre	22	9	2	11	28	31	−3	29	
9	Guabirá	22	9	2	11	29	43	−14	29	
10	Nacional Potosí	22	8	4	10	28	30	−2	28	
11	Real Mamoré	22	6	2	14	27	44	−17	20	
12	La Paz	22	5	2	15	21	45	−24	17	

Rules for classification: 1st points; 2nd goal difference; 3rd number of goals scored.

Liga de Fútbol Profesional Boliviano
2011 Torneo Adecuación champion

17th title

== Results ==
Home \ Away	AUR	BLO	BOL	GUA	LPA	NAC	OPE	RMA	RPO	SJO	STR	UNI
Aurora		0–0	0–0	2–0	3–2	3–1	3–2	3–0	1–0	1–1	0–1	2–2
Blooming	3–1		2–0	4–1	3–0	1–0	0–2	1–0	1–2	2–1	1–1	4–1
Bolívar	1–1	1–0		3–2	2–1	0–0	1–1	4–0	3–0	3–2	1–0	3–0
Guabirá	2–0	0–3	1–1		3–1	1–0	0–1	3–0	2–1	3–1	1–0	1–3
La Paz	0–3	3–1	2–3	0–0		0–1	2–1	2–0	0–2	1–0	1–1	0–2
Nacional Potosí	0–2	3–1	2–1	4–1	2–1		2–1	1–1	0–0	3–0	3–4	2–0
Oriente Petrolero	2–0	1–2	6–0	2–3	6–0	3–1		3–1	2–2	2–1	3–2	0–0
Real Mamoré	1–1	2–1	1–2	2–3	3–2	2–0	2–5		1–2	2–0	6–2	1–0
Real Potosí	2–1	3–1	0–0	3–1	1–0	3–0	0–3	4–0		1–1	1–1	2–0
San José	1–0	2–1	3–2	5–0	0–1	2–1	1–0	2–1	2–1		2–1	1–0
The Strongest	1–3	4–0	0–0	4–0	3–1	1–0	1–0	1–0	2–1	0–0		1–2
Universitario de Sucre	3–1	0–2	0–1	3–1	5–1	3–2	1–0	2–1	0–1	0–1	2–1	

Source: Soccerway.com
Legend: Blue = home team win; Yellow = draw; Red = away team win.

== Top goalscorers ==
Rank	Player	Player nationality	Club	Goals
1	Juan Maraude	Argentine	Real Mamoré	19
2	Mauricio Saucedo	Bolivian	Oriente Petrolero	12
3	Zé Carlos	Brazilian	Bolívar	10
4	Alcides Peña	Bolivian	Oriente Petrolero	9
4	Jair Reynoso	Colombian	Aurora	9
6	Joaquín Botero	Bolivian	San José	8
6	Oscar Díaz	Bolivian	Blooming	8
6	Christian Ruíz	Argentine	The Strongest	8
9	Diego Cabrera	Bolivian	Aurora	7
9	Marcos Ovejero	Argentine	Guabirá	7
