= Guillermo Hoyos =

Argentine footballer and manager

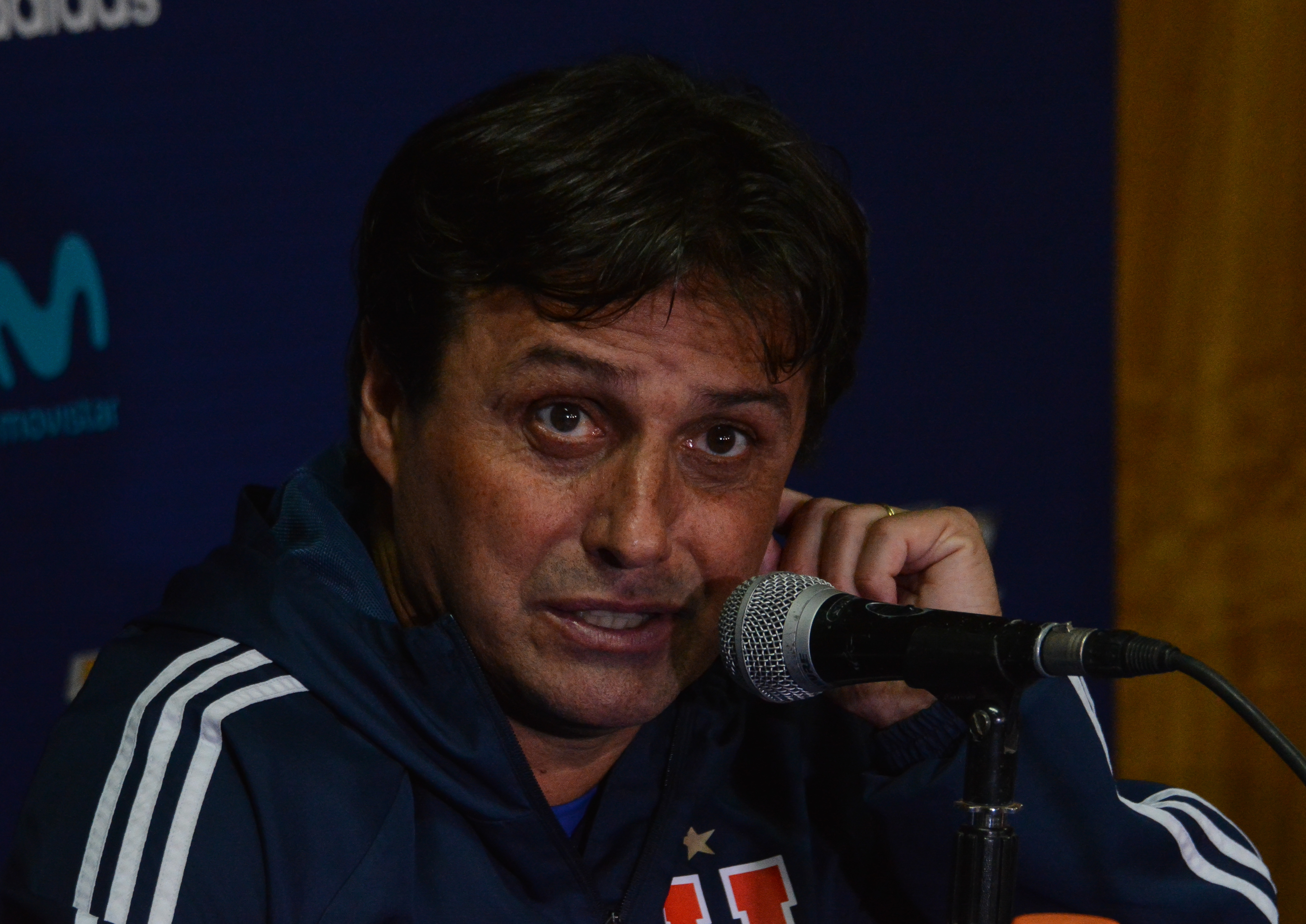
- Hoyos as manager of Universidad de Chile in 2018

Personal information
- Full name: Ángel Guillermo Hoyos Marchisio
- Date of birth: 9 June 1963 (age 63)
- Place of birth: Córdoba, Argentina
- Height: 1.73 m (5 ft 8 in)
- Position: Midfielder

Senior career*
Years	Team	Apps	(Gls)
1979	Banfield		
1979–1981	Talleres		
1981–1982	Real Madrid B	15	(3)
1982–1984	Talleres		
1985	Blooming		
1986–1989	Boca Juniors	42	(2)
1990	Gimnasia La Plata	10	(1)
1991	Everton Viña del Mar	11	(2)
1991–1992	Chacarita Juniors		
1992–1993	Deportes Tolima	38	(2)
1994	Unión Magdalena		
1995	Deportivo Táchira		
1996	El Vigía		
1997	Minervén		

Managerial career
- 2003–2005: Barcelona (youth)
- 2006–2007: Aris
- 2007–2008: Atromitos
- 2008–2009: PAS Giannina
- 2009–2010: Panserraikos
- 2010–2011: Anorthosis Famagusta
- 2011–2012: Bolívar
- 2012–2013: Once Caldas
- 2013–2014: Iraklis
- 2014: Talleres
- 2015: Jacksonville Armada
- 2016: Bolivia
- 2016–2018: Universidad de Chile
- 2018–2019: Atlas
- 2019–2021: Aldosivi
- 2022: Talleres
- 2023: Oriente Petrolero
- 2026: Inter Miami (interim)
- * Club domestic league appearances and goals

Ángel Guillermo Hoyos Marchisio (born 9 June 1963), known as Guillermo Hoyos, is an Argentine football manager and former player who played as a midfielder. He was most recently the interim head coach of Major League Soccer club Inter Miami.

== Playing career ==
Hoyos hails from Villa Maria, Cordoba, Argentina and has played club football for Boca Juniors, Banfield, Gimnasia y Esgrima de La Plata, Talleres de Cordoba, Chacarita Juniors in Argentina, Deportes Tolima and Unión Magdalena (Colombia), Everton de Viña del Mar (Chile), Deportivo Táchira, Minervén, El Vigía (Venezuela) Club Blooming (Bolivia) and Real Madrid Castilla (Spain).

With Boca Juniors, he won the 1989 Supercopa. He also played in the National Olympic Team of Argentina and the National team of Argentina.

== Managerial career ==
As a coach, he worked for two years at Barcelona's Juvenil B squad, where he discovered Lionel Messi, additionally he has won the youth championship twice, before he went to Greece. He first appeared in the summer of 2006 where he was in Aris Thessaloniki, in the year when he returned from the League and made it a purely Latin team playing offensive football that was at the time missing in the Greek league.

Anorthosis confirmed Hoyos appointment on 26 May 2010, and he officially took up the team on 31 May. Hoyos had completely changed the squad of Anorthosis Famagusta, by transferring players known for their speed from all over the positions of the field. He is also famous for his ambitions of offensive football, and the formation of 4–3–3 that he had established at Anorthosis. Hoyos was not a holder of the UEFA Pro coaching license, therefore Anorthosis recruited Bulgarian coach Vasil Simov as "virtual" first coach, and the Argentine was declared as technical director during Anorthosis matches. This did not work and Hoyos was released from his contract on November 17, 2010.

On 3 November 2013, Hoyos signed a contract with Greek Football League club Iraklis.

He joined Inter Miami in Major League Soccer in 2023 as the academy director of methodology and reunited with Messi. Hoyos was appointed the director of player development and later became an assistant scout and coach under manager Javier Mascherano. After Mascherano resigned as head coach in April 2026, Hoyos was appointed as the interim head coach of the first team. On 27 August, Hoyos was replaced by Kily González as their new permanent head coach.

== Honours ==
=== Player ===
Boca Juniors

- Supercopa Sudamericana: 1989

=== Manager ===
Club Bolívar

- Bolivian League Championship: 2011-AD

Universidad de Chile

- Chilean Primera División: 2017-C

Individual

- Chilean Primera División Best Manager: 2017
