= Wálter Flores (footballer) =

Bolivian footballer (born 1978)

Personal information
- Full name: Wálter Alberto Flores Condarco
- Date of birth: 29 October 1978 (age 48)
- Place of birth: Oruro, Bolivia
- Height: 1.68 m (5 ft 6 in)
- Position: Midfielder

Senior career*
Years	Team	Apps	(Gls)
2000–2006	San José	140	(2)
2006	Real Potosí	14	(0)
2007–2008	The Strongest	65	(2)
2008–2017	Bolívar	214	(3)
Total		433	(7)

International career
2004–2016	Bolivia	32	(1)

Managerial career
- 2017: Bolívar (assistant)
- 2018: Universidad Católica (assistant)
- 2018–2025: Bolívar (youth)
- 2020: Bolívar (interim)
- 2023: Bolívar (interim)
- 2025: GV San José
- 2026: Universitario de Vinto
- 2026: ABB
- * Club domestic league appearances and goals

Wálter Alberto Flores Condarco (born 29 October 1978) is a Bolivian football manager and former player who played as a midfielder.

== Club career ==
Born in Oruro, Flores began playing professional football in 2000 for Club San José in his native Oruro. After six years and 140 games played in first division, he transferred to Real Potosí. Fourteen appearances seemed to be enough to convince The Strongest, which signed him for the 2007 season. After two great years with the atigrados, Flores decided to move to the other side of town, and joined rival team Bolívar in 2009.

== International career ==
Between 2004 and 2012, Flores has gained 31 caps for the Bolivia national football team, scoring 1 goal. He represented his country in 15 FIFA World Cup qualification matches.

== Honours ==
=== Bolivar ===
Bolivian Primera División: 2009 Apertura, 2011 Adecuacion
