= 2008–09 in Argentine football =

Football in Argentina
- Season: 2008–09

2008–09 season of Argentine football was the 118th season of competitive football in Argentina.

== National leagues ==
=== Men's ===
==== Primera División ====
- Apertura champion: Boca Juniors (23rd title).
  - Top scorer: José Sand (15 goals).
- Clausura champion: Vélez Sarsfield (7th title).
  - Top scorer: José Sand (13 goals).
- International qualifiers:
  - 2009 Copa Libertadores: Boca Juniors, San Lorenzo, Estudiantes (LP).
  - 2010 Copa Libertadores: Vélez Sarsfield.
  - 2009 Copa Sudamericana: Lanús, Vélez Sarsfield, San Lorenzo, Tigre.
  - 2009 FIFA Club World Cup: Estudiantes (LP).
  - 2010 Recopa Sudamericana: Estudiantes (LP).
- Relegated: Gimnasia y Esgrima (J), San Martín (T)

Source: RSSSF

==== Primera B Nacional ====
- Champion: Atlético Tucumán (1st title).
  - Top scorer: Luis Rodríguez (20 goals).
- Promoted: Atlético Tucumán, Chacarita Juniors.
- Relegated: Talleres de Córdoba, Almagro, Los Andes.

Source: RSSSF

==== Primera B Metropolitana ====
- Champion: Sportivo Italiano (2nd title).
  - Top scorer: Luciano Lo Bianco (20 goals).
- Promoted: Sportivo Italiano, Deportivo Merlo.
- Relegated: Talleres (RE).

Source: RSSSF

==== Torneo Argentino A ====
- Champion: Boca Unidos (1st title).
  - Top scorer: Cristian Núñez (19 goals).
- Promoted: Boca Unidos.
- Relegated: Talleres de Perico, Real Arroyo Seco, Gimnasia (Mendoza), Alvarado.

Source: RSSSF

==== Primera C Metropolitana ====
- Champion: Villa San Carlos (1st title).
  - Top scorer: Gustavo Pastor (21 goles).
- Promoted: Villa San Carlos.
- Relegated: Cañuelas

Source: RSSSF

==== Torneo Argentino B ====
- Promoted: Unión de Mar del Plata, Estudiantes de Río Cuarto, Sportivo Belgrano, Crucero del Norte.
- Relegated: Deportivo Coreano, Sportivo 9 de Julio, Sol de América, Racing de Trelew.

Source: RSSSF

==== Primera D Metropolitana ====
- Champion: Ferrocarril Midland (3rd title).
  - Top scorer: Damián Solferino (24 goles).
- Promoted: Ferrocarril Midland.
- Relegated: Puerto Nuevo.

Source: RSSSF

==== Torneo Argentino C ====
- Promoted: Ferrocarril Sud de Olavarria, Union de Villa Krause, Independiente de Tandil, Boca de Rio Gallegos.

Source: RSSSF

=== Women's ===
==== Campeonato de Fútbol Femenino ====
- Apertura champion: San Lorenzo (1st title).
- Clausura champion: River Plate (9th title).
- International qualifier:
  - 2009 Copa Libertadores de Fútbol Femenino: San Lorenzo.

Source: RSSSF

== Clubs in international competitions ==
| Team / Competition | 2008 Suruga Bank Championship | 2008 Recopa Sudamericana | 2008 Copa Sudamericana | 2009 Copa Libertadores |
|---|---|---|---|---|
| Argentinos Juniors | Did not play | Did not play | Semifinals eliminated by (Argentina) Estudiantes | did not qualify |
| Arsenal de Sarandí | Champions defeated (Japan) Gamba Osaka | Runner up lost to (Argentina) Boca Juniors | Round of 16 eliminated by (Argentina) Estudiantes | did not qualify |
| Boca Juniors | Did not play | Champions defeated (Argentina) Arsenal de Sarandí | Quarterfinals eliminated by (Brazil) Internacional | Round of 16 eliminated by (Uruguay) Defensor Sporting |
| Estudiantes de La Plata | Did not play | Did not play | Runner up lost to (Brazil) Internacional | Champions defeated (Brazil) Cruzeiro |
| Independiente | Did not play | Did not play | First Round eliminated by (Argentina) Estudiantes | did not qualify |
| Lanús | Did not play | Did not play | did not qualify | Group stage eliminated (finished last in the group) |
| River Plate | Did not play | Did not play | Quarterfinals eliminated by (Mexico) Guadalajara | Group stage eliminated (finished 3rd in the group) |
| San Lorenzo | Did not play | Did not play | First Round eliminated by (Argentina) Argentinos Juniors | Group stage eliminated (finished last in the group) |

== National teams ==
Win Draw Loss

=== Men's ===
This section covers Argentina men's matches from August 1, 2008 to July 31, 2009.

For the Olympic Games results, please see here. Those results are not tallied here because the team is made of Under–23 players, not the full squad.

==== Friendly matches ====
| August 20, 2008 | Belarus | 0 – 0 | Argentina | Minsk, Belarus |
| | | (Report) | | Stadium: Dinamo Stadium |

| November 19, 2008 | Scotland | 0 – 1 | Argentina | Glasgow, Scotland |
| 20:00 UTC±0 | | (Report) | Rodríguez 8' | Stadium: Hampden Park; Attendance: 32,492; Referee: Felix Brych (Germany) |

| February 11, 2009 | France | 0 – 2 | Argentina | Marseille, France |
| 21:00 UTC+1 | | (Report) | Gutiérrez 41'; Messi 83' | Stadium: Stade Vélodrome |

| May 20, 2009 | Argentina | 3 – 1 | Panama | Santa Fe, Argentina |
| | Defederico 26'; Bergessio 39', 84' | (Report) | Barahona 29' | Stadium: Estadio Brigadier General Estanislao López |

==== 2010 World Cup qualifiers ====
| September 6, 2008 Round 7 | Argentina | 1 – 1 | Paraguay | Buenos Aires, Argentina |
| 16:00 UTC-3 | Agüero 60' | (Report) | Heinze 13' (o.g.) | Stadium: Estadio Antonio V. Liberti; Attendance: 46,250; Referee: Carlos Eugênio Simon (Brazil) |

| September 10, 2008 Round 8 | Peru | 1 – 1 | Argentina | Lima, Peru |
| 21:30 UTC-5 | Fano 90+3' | (Report) | Cambiasso 82' | Stadium: Estadio Monumental "U"; Attendance: 40,000; Referee: Carlos Amarilla (Paraguay) |

| October 11, 2008 Round 9 | Argentina | 2 – 1 | Uruguay | Buenos Aires, Argentina |
| 18:10 UTC-3 | Messi 6'; Agüero 13' | (Report) | Lugano 40' | Stadium: Estadio Antonio V. Liberti; Attendance: 42,421; Referee: Carlos Torres (Paraguay) |

| October 15, 2008 Round 10 | Chile | 1 – 0 | Argentina | Santiago, Chile |
| 20:15 UTC-3 | Orellana 35' | (Report) | | Stadium: Estadio Nacional; Attendance: 65,000; Referee: Óscar Ruiz (Colombia) |

| March 28, 2009 Round 11 | Argentina | 4 – 0 | Venezuela | Buenos Aires, Argentina |
| 19:10 UTC-3 | Messi 26'; Tevez 47'; Rodríguez 51'; Agüero 73' | (Report) | | Stadium: Estadio Antonio V. Liberti; Attendance: 46,085; Referee: Victor Hugo Rivera (Peru) |

| April 1, 2009 Round 12 | Bolivia | 6 – 1 | Argentina | La Paz, Bolivia |
| 15:30 UTC-4 | M. Moreno 12'; Botero 34' (pen.), 55', 66'; Álex da Rosa 45'; Torrico 87' | (Report) | González 25' | Stadium: Estadio Hernando Siles; Attendance: 30,487; Referee: Martín Vázquez (Uruguay) |

| June 6, 2009 Round 13 | Argentina | 1 – 0 | Colombia | Buenos Aires, Argentina |
| 18:00 UTC-3 | Díaz 56' | (Report) | | Stadium: Estadio Antonio V. Liberti; Attendance: 55,000; Referee: René Ortubé (Bolivia) |

| June 10, 2009 Round 14 | Ecuador | 2 – 0 | Argentina | Quito, Ecuador |
| 16:00 UTC-5 | Ayoví 72'; Palacios 83' | (Report) | | Stadium: Estadio Olímpico Atahualpa; Attendance: 36,359; Referee: Carlos Chandía (Chile) |

=== Women's ===
This section covers Argentina women's matches from August 1, 2008 to July 31, 2009.

==== 2008 Women's Olympic football tournament ====
| August 6, 2008 First Round | Argentina | 1 – 2 | Canada | Tianjin, China |
| 17:00 | Manicler 85' | (Report) | Chapman 27'; Lang 72' | Stadium: Tianjin Olympic Center Stadium; Attendance: 23,201; Referee: Christine Beck (Germany) |

| August 9, 2008 First Round | Sweden | 1 – 0 | Argentina | Tianjin, China |
| 17:00 | Fischer 57' | (Report) | | Stadium: Tianjin Olympic Center Stadium; Attendance: 38,293; Referee: Dianne Ferreira-James (Guyana) |

| August 12, 2008 First Round | China | 2 – 0 | Argentina | Qinhuangdao, China |
| 19:45 | Han Duan 52'; Gu Yasha 90' | (Report) | | Stadium: Qinhuangdao Olympic Sports Center Stadium; Attendance: 31,492; Referee: Nicole Petignat (Switzerland) |
