= Peru national football team results (2000–2019) =

This is a list of the Peru national football team results from 2000 to 2019.

== Results ==
Key
Win
Draw
Defeat

=== 2000 ===
14 February Gold Cup Group B	Haiti	1–1	Peru	Miami
21:00 ET (UTC−4)	Vorbe 61'	Report	Zúñiga 69'	Stadium: Orange Bowl; Attendance: 23,795; Referee: Carlos Batres (GUA)

16 February Gold Cup Group B	Peru	0–1	United States	Miami
21:00 ET (UTC−4)		Report	Jones 59'	Stadium: Orange Bowl; Attendance: 36,004; Referee: Felipe Ramos (MEX)

19 February Gold Cup quarter-finals	Honduras	3–5	Peru	Miami
17:30 ET (UTC−4)	Clavasquín 32'; Pavón 67' (pen.); Pineda 69'	Report	Holsen 7'; Soto 14' (pen.); Del Solar 50'; Palacios 52'; Sáenz 87'	Stadium: Orange Bowl; Attendance: 32,972; Referee: Marío Sánchez (CHI)

23 February Gold Cup Semi-finals	Colombia	2–1	Peru	San Diego
20:00 ET (UTC−4)	Salazar 39' (o.g.); Bonilla 53'	Report	Palacios 75'	Stadium: Qualcomm Stadium; Attendance: 3,402; Referee: Rafael Rodríguez (SLV)

29 March 2002 FIFA World Cup qualification	Peru	2–0	Paraguay	Lima
21:45 PET (UTC−5)	Solano 55' (pen.); Palacios 60'	Report		Stadium: Estadio Nacional; Attendance: 45,042; Referee: Horacio Elizondo (ARG)

26 April 2002 FIFA World Cup qualification	Chile	1–1	Peru	Santiago
21:00 CLT (UTC−4)	Margas 42'	Report	Jayo 38'	Stadium: Estadio Nacional; Attendance: 44,979; Referee: Epifanio González (PAR)

4 June 2002 FIFA World Cup qualification	Peru	0–1	Brazil	Lima
15:15 PET (UTC−5)		Report	Zago 34'	Stadium: Estadio Nacional; Attendance: 45,000; Referee: Daniel Giménez (ARG)

29 June 2002 FIFA World Cup qualification	Ecuador	2–1	Peru	Quito
16:00 ECT (UTC−5)	Chalá 14'; Hurtado 51'	Report	Pajuelo 73'	Stadium: Estadio Olímpico Atahualpa; Attendance: 40,167; Referee: Carlos Eugênio Simon (BRA)

19 July 2002 FIFA World Cup qualification	Peru	0–1	Colombia	Lima
21:10 PET (UTC−5)		Report	Ángel 48'	Stadium: Estadio Nacional; Attendance: 32,207; Referee: Marío Sánchez (CHI)

26 July 2002 FIFA World Cup qualification	Uruguay	0–0	Peru	Montevideo
19:30 UYT (UTC−3)		Report		Stadium: Estadio Centenario; Attendance: 54,345; Referee: Oscar Godoi (BRA)

16 August 2002 FIFA World Cup qualification	Peru	1–0	Venezuela	Lima
21:00 PET (UTC−5)	Palacios 69'	Report		Stadium: Estadio Nacional; Attendance: 41,084; Referee: Byron Moreno (ECU)

3 September 2002 FIFA World Cup qualification	Peru	1–2	Argentina	Lima
17:45 PET (UTC−5)	Samuel 68' (o.g.)	Report	Crespo 25'; Verón 37'	Stadium: Estadio Nacional; Attendance: 43,951; Referee: Óscar Ruiz (COL)

8 October 2002 FIFA World Cup qualification	Bolivia	1–0	Peru	La Paz
16:00 BOT (UTC−4)	Suárez 5'	Report		Stadium: Estadio Hernando Siles; Attendance: 21,791; Referee: José Carpio (ECU)

15 November 2002 FIFA World Cup qualification	Paraguay	5–1	Peru	Asunción
19:45 PYT (UTC−3)	Santa Cruz 15' del Solar 25' (o.g.); Cardozo 45'; Paredes 65'; Chilavert 83' (pen.)	Report	García 76'	Stadium: Estadio Defensores del Chaco; Attendance: 30,000; Referee: Daniel Giménez (ARG)

=== 2001 ===
7 March Friendly	Honduras	0–0	Peru	Miami
EST (UTC−4)				Stadium: Orange Bowl; Attendance: 17,790; Referee: Kevin Perry (USA)

27 March 2002 FIFA World Cup qualification	Peru	3–1	Chile	Lima
21:30 PET (UTC−5)	Maestri 53'; Mendoza 72'; Pizarro 81'	Report	Navia 61'	Stadium: Estadio Nacional; Attendance: 38,901; Referee: Ángel Sánchez (ARG)

25 April 2002 FIFA World Cup qualification	Brazil	1–1	Peru	São Paulo
21:45 BRT (UTC−3)	Romário 65'	Report	Pajuelo 77'	Stadium: Estadio do Morumbi; Attendance: 55,000; Referee: Abdul Rahman Al-Zeid (KSA)

2 June 2002 FIFA World Cup qualification	Peru	1–2	Ecuador	Lima
16:00 PET (UTC−5)	Pizarro 2'	Report	Méndez 11'; Delgado 90+1'	Stadium: Estadio Monumental "U"; Attendance: 54,236; Referee: Antonio Marrufo (MEX)

12 July Copa América Group B	Peru	3–3	Paraguay	Cali
17:30 COT (UTC−5)	Lobatón 16'; Pajuelo 57' del Solar 72'		Ferreira 23', 64'; Garay 90'	Stadium: Estadio Pascual Guerrero; Referee: Ángel Sánchez (ARG)

15 July Copa América Group B	Brazil	2–0	Peru	Cali
16:00 COT (UTC−5)	Guilherme 9'; Denílson 85'			Stadium: Estadio Pascual Guerrero; Referee: Jorge Larrionda (URU)

18 July Copa América Group B	Peru	1–0	Mexico	Cali
17:30 COT (UTC−5)	Holsen 48'			Stadium: Estadio Pascual Guerrero; Referee: René Ortube (BOL)

23 July Copa América Quarter-finals	Colombia	3–0	Peru	Armenia
19:45 COT (UTC−5)	Aristizábal 50', 69'; Hernández 66'			Stadium: Estadio Centenario; Referee: Gilberto Alcalá (MEX)

16 August 2002 FIFA World Cup qualification	Colombia	0–1	Peru	Bogotá
20:00 COT (UTC−5)		Report	Solano 47'	Stadium: Estadio El Campín; Attendance: 33,875; Referee: Felipe Ramos (MEX)

4 September 2002 FIFA World Cup qualification	Peru	0–2	Uruguay	Lima
21:00 PET (UTC−5)		Report	Silva 11'; Recoba 45'	Stadium: Estadio Nacional; Attendance: 36,226; Referee: Anders Frisk (SWE)

6 October 2002 FIFA World Cup qualification	Venezuela	3–0	Peru	San Cristóbal
19:30 VET (UTC−4)	Alvarado 54', 77'; Morán 80'	Report		Stadium: Estadio Polideportivo de Pueblo Nuevo; Attendance: 33,875; Referee: Mario Sánchez Yanten (CHI)

8 November 2002 FIFA World Cup qualification	Argentina	2–0	Peru	Buenos Aires
18:00 ART (UTC−3)	Samuel 46'; López 84'	Report		Stadium: Estadio Monumental Antonio Vespucio Liberti; Attendance: 18,901; Referee: Jorge Larrionda (URU)

14 November 2002 FIFA World Cup qualification	Peru	1–1	Bolivia	Lima
20:30 PET (UTC−5)	Alva 8'	Report	Castillo 87'	Stadium: Estadio Monumental "U"; Attendance: 2,374; Referee: Héctor Baldassi (ARG)

=== 2002 ===
Peru played no matches in 2002.

=== 2003 ===
23 February Friendly	Peru	5–1	Haiti	Lima
	Jos. Soto 13' (pen.), 82'; Serrano 19'; Jor. Soto 26'; Farfán 84'		Menelas 50'	Stadium: Estadio Alejandro Villanueva; Referee: Víctor Hugo Rivera (PER)

30 March Friendly	Chile	2–0	Peru	Santiago
19:00 CLT (UTC−4)	Mirošević 44'; Pinilla 64'	Report		Stadium: Estadio Nacional; Attendance: 39,662; Referee: Carlos Amarilla (PAR)

2 April Friendly	Peru	3–0	Chile	Lima
19:00 PET (UTC−5)	Quinteros 18'; Pizarro 48', 49'			Stadium: Estadio Nacional; Referee: Óscar Ruiz (COL)

30 April Friendly	Peru	0–1	Paraguay	Lima
		Report	Alvarenga 72'	Attendance: 17,500

12 June Friendly	Ecuador	2–2	Peru	East Rutherford
	Tenorio 26', 62'	Report	Silva 42'; Mendoza 55'	Stadium: Giants Stadium; Attendance: 35,000; Referee: Brian Hall (USA)

27 June Friendly	Peru	1–0	Venezuela	Miami
	Carmona 74'	Report

2 July Friendly	Peru	2–1	Guatemala	San Francisco
	Silva 14'; Orejuela 34'	Report	Romero 82' (pen.)	Stadium: Candlestick Park

24 July Friendly	Peru	3–4	Uruguay	Lima
	Farfán 27', 56'; Marengo 46'	Report	Ligüera 10', 72'; Sosa 49'; Vigneri 79'	Stadium: Estadio Nacional

30 July Friendly	Uruguay	1–0	Peru	Montevideo
	Ligüera 54'	Report		Stadium: Centenario; Attendance: 9,000

21 August Friendly	Mexico	1–3	Peru	East Rutherford
	Trujillo 54'	Report	Pizarro 1'; Zegarra 31'; Solano 33'	Stadium: Giants Stadium; Attendance: 30,143

27 August Friendly	Peru	0–0	Guatemala	Lima
		Report		Stadium: Estadio Nacional; Attendance: 2,000

6 September 2006 FIFA World Cup qualification	Peru	4–1	Paraguay	Lima
20:15 PET (UTC−5)	Solano 34'; Mendoza 42'; Soto 83'; Farfán 90'	Report	Gamarra 24'	Stadium: Estadio Nacional; Attendance: 42,557; Referee: Héctor Baldassi (ARG)

9 September 2006 FIFA World Cup qualification	Chile	2–1	Peru	Santiago
21:15 CLT (UTC−4)	Pinilla 35'; Norambuena 70'	Report	Mendoza 57'	Stadium: Estadio Nacional; Attendance: 54,303; Referee: Daniel Giménez (ARG)

16 November 2006 FIFA World Cup qualification	Peru	1–1	Brazil	Lima
16:00 PET (UTC−5)	Solano 50'	Report	Rivaldo 20' (pen.)	Stadium: Estadio Monumental "U"; Attendance: 70,000; Referee: Óscar Ruiz (COL)

19 November 2006 FIFA World Cup qualification	Ecuador	0–0	Peru	Quito
17:00 ECT (UTC−5)		Report		Stadium: Estadio Olímpico Atahualpa; Attendance: 34,361; Referee: Epifanio González (PAR)

=== 2004 ===
18 February Friendly	Spain	2–1	Peru	Barcelona
15:30 CET (UTC+1)	Etxeberria 30'; Baraja 32'	Report	Solano 21'	Stadium: Estadi Olímpic Lluís Companys; Attendance: 17,000; Referee: Bertrand Layec (FRA)

31 March 2006 FIFA World Cup qualification	Peru	0–2	Colombia	Lima
21:45 PET (UTC−5)		Report	Grisales 30'; Oviedo 42'	Stadium: Estadio Nacional; Attendance: 29,325; Referee: Márcio Rezende de Freitas (BRA)

28 April Friendly	Chile	1–1	Peru	Antofagasta
20:10 CLT (UTC−3)	Fuentes 56'	Report	Zúñiga 90'	Stadium: Estadio Regional de Antofagasta; Attendance: 32,000

1 June 2006 FIFA World Cup qualification	Uruguay	1–3	Peru	Montevideo
21:40 UYT (UTC−3)	Forlán 72'	Report	Solano 13'; Pizarro 18'; Farfán 61'	Stadium: Centenario; Attendance: 30,000; Referee: Rubén Selman (CHI)

6 June 2006 FIFA World Cup qualification	Peru	0–0	Venezuela	Lima
15:00 PET (UTC−5)		Report		Stadium: Estadio Nacional; Attendance: 40,000; Referee: Jorge Larrionda (URU)

30 June Friendly	Argentina	2–1	Peru	East Rutherford
21:30 EDT (UTC−4)	González 24'; Saviola 73'	Report	Solano 35' (pen.)	Stadium: Giants Stadium; Referee: Kevin Scott (USA)

6 July Copa América Group A	Peru	2–2	Bolivia	Lima
20:45 PET (UTC−5)	Pizarro 66' (pen.); Palacios 88'	Report	Botero 36'; Álvarez 57'	Stadium: Estadio Nacional; Attendance: 45,000; Referee: Héctor Baldassi (ARG)

9 July Copa América Group A	Peru	3–1	Venezuela	Lima
20:45 PET (UTC−5)	Farfán 34'; Solano 62'; Acasiete 72'	Report	Margiotta 74'	Stadium: Estadio Nacional; Attendance: 45,000; Referee: Rubén Selman (CHI)

12 July Copa América Group A	Peru	2–2	Colombia	Trujillo
20:45 PET (UTC−5)	Solano 58'; Maestri 60'	Report	Congo 33'; Aguilar 53'	Stadium: Estadio Mansiche; Attendance: 27,000; Referee: William Mattus (CRC)

17 July Copa América Quarter-finals	Peru	0–1	Argentina	Chiclayo
18:00 PET (UTC−5)		Report	Tevez 60'	Stadium: Estadio Elías Aguirre; Attendance: 26,500; Referee: Carlos Amarilla (PAR)

4 September 2006 FIFA World Cup qualification	Peru	1–3	Argentina	Lima
19:00 PET (UTC−5)	Soto 62'	Report	Rosales 14'; Coloccini 66'; Sorín 90+2'	Stadium: Estadio Monumental "U"; Attendance: 28,000; Referee: Carlos Eugênio Simon (BRA)

9 October 2006 FIFA World Cup qualification	Bolivia	1–0	Peru	La Paz
19:00 BOT (UTC−4)	Botero 56'	Report		Stadium: Estadio Hernando Siles; Attendance: 23,729; Referee: Carlos Amarilla (PAR)

13 October 2006 FIFA World Cup qualification	Paraguay	1–1	Peru	Asunción
19:00 PYT (UTC−4)	Paredes 13'	Report	Solano 74'	Stadium: Defensores del Chaco; Attendance: 30,000; Referee: Óscar Ruiz (COL)

17 November 2006 FIFA World Cup qualification	Peru	2–1	Chile	Lima
20:00 PET (UTC−5)	Farfán 56'; Guerrero 85'	Report	González 90+1'	Stadium: Estadio Nacional; Attendance: 39,752; Referee: Héctor Baldassi (ARG)

=== 2005 ===
27 March 2006 FIFA World Cup qualification	Brazil	1–0	Peru	Goiânia
19:00 BRT (UTC−3)	Kaká 74'	Report		Stadium: Estádio Serra Dourada; Attendance: 49,163; Referee: Carlos Amarilla (PAR)

30 March 2006 FIFA World Cup qualification	Peru	2–2	Ecuador	Lima
20:00 PET (UTC−5)	Guerrero 1'; Farfán 58'	Report	de la Cruz 4'; Valencia 45'	Stadium: Estadio Nacional; Attendance: 40,000; Referee: Carlos Chandía (CHI)

22 May Kirin Cup	Japan	0–1	Peru	Niigata
19:00 JST (UTC+9)			Vassallo 90+1'	Stadium: Niigata Stadium; Attendance: 39,856; Referee: Ľuboš Micheľ (SVK)

24 May Kirin Cup	Peru	0–0	United Arab Emirates	Toyota
19:00 JST (UTC+9)		Report		Stadium: Toyota Stadium; Attendance: 6,536; Referee: Yuichi Nishimura (JPN)

4 June 2006 FIFA World Cup qualification	Colombia	5–0	Peru	Barranquilla
15:00 COT (UTC−5)	Rey 29'; Soto 55'; Ángel 58'; Restrepo 75'; Perea 78'	Report		Stadium: Estadio Metropolitano Roberto Meléndez; Attendance: 15,000; Referee: Carlos Torres (PAR)

7 June 2006 FIFA World Cup qualification	Peru	0–0	Uruguay	Lima
20:00 PET (UTC−5)		Report		Stadium: Estadio Nacional; Attendance: 31,515; Referee: Héctor Baldassi (ARG)

17 August Friendly	Peru	3–1	Chile	Tacna
	Vílchez 28'; Guerrero 59'; Villalta 63'	Report	Fuentes 37'	Stadium: Estadio Jorge Basadre; Attendance: 25,000

3 September 2006 FIFA World Cup qualification	Venezuela	4–1	Peru	Maracaibo
19:00 VET (UTC−4)	Maldonado 17'; Arango 68'; Torrealba 73', 79'	Report	Farfán 63'	Stadium: Estadio José Pachencho Romero; Attendance: 6,000; Referee: Márcio Rezende de Freitas (BRA)

9 October 2006 FIFA World Cup qualification	Argentina	2–0	Peru	Buenos Aires
19:10 ART (UTC−3)	Riquelme 81' (pen.); Guadalupe 90' (o.g.)	Report		Stadium: Estadio Monumental Antonio Vespucio Liberti; Attendance: 36,977; Referee: Carlos Torres (PAR)

12 October 2006 FIFA World Cup qualification	Peru	4–1	Bolivia	Tacna
20:00 PET (UTC−5)	Vasallo 11'; Acasiete 38'; Farfán 45', 82'	Report	Gutiérrez 66'	Stadium: Estadio Jorge Basadre; Attendance: 14,775; Referee: Oscar Sequiera (ARG)

=== 2006 ===
10 May Friendly	Trinidad and Tobago	1–1	Peru	Port of Spain
	Jones 74'		Vasallo 31'	Stadium: Hasely Crawford Stadium

18 August Friendly	Peru	0–2	Panama	Lima
		Report	Phillips 20'; Gómez 86'	Stadium: Estadio Nacional; Attendance: 1,000

6 September Friendly	Ecuador	1–1	Peru	East Rutherford
	Benítez 13'	Report	Guerrero 75'	Stadium: Giants Stadium; Attendance: 20,000; Referee: Terry Vaughn (USA)

7 October Copa del Pacífico	Chile	3–2	Peru	Viña del Mar
	Fernández 28', 50'; Navia 70'	Report	Guerrero 8' (pen.); Pizarro 83'	Stadium: Estadio Sausalito; Attendance: 20,000; Referee: Olivier Viera (URU)

11 October Copa del Pacífico	Peru	0–1	Chile	Tacna
		Report	Navia 24'	Stadium: Estadio Jorge Basadre; Attendance: 12,000; Referee: Samuel Haro (ECU)

15 November Friendly	Jamaica	1–1	Peru	Kingston
19:00 EST (UTC−5)	Hue 78'	Report	Sánchez 64'	Stadium: Independence Park

19 November Friendly	Panama	1–2	Peru	Panama City
	Tejada 38' (pen.)	Report	Mostto 4'; Alva 80'	Stadium: Estadio Rommel Fernández; Attendance: 2,000

=== 2007 ===
24 March Friendly	Japan	2–0	Peru	Yokohama
	Maki 19'; Takahara 54'	Report		Stadium: Nissan Stadium; Attendance: 60,400; Referee: Angelo Nardi (AUS)

3 June Friendly	Ecuador	1–2	Peru	Madrid
13:00 CET (UTC+1)	Tenorio 10' (pen.)	Report	Farfán 4' de la Cruz 50' (o.g.)	Stadium: Vicente Calderón Stadium

6 June Friendly	Ecuador	2–0	Peru	Barcelona
15:00 CET (UTC+1)	Benítez 84' de la Cruz 90'	Report		Stadium: Mini Estadi

26 June Copa América Group A	Uruguay	0–3	Peru	Mérida
18:05 VET (UTC−4)		Report	Villalta 27'; Mariño 70'; Guerrero 88'	Stadium: Estadio Metropolitano de Mérida; Attendance: 23,000; Referee: Carlos Amarilla (PAR)

30 June Copa América Group A	Venezuela	2–0	Peru	San Cristóbal
18:20 VET (UTC−4)	Cichero 48'; Arismendi 79'	Report		Stadium: Estadio Polideportivo de Pueblo Nuevo; Attendance: 40,000; Referee: Benito Archundia (MEX)

3 July Copa América Group A	Peru	2–2	Bolivia	Mérida
18:35 VET (UTC−4)	Pizarro 34', 85'	Report	Moreno 24'; Campos 45'	Stadium: Estadio Metropolitano de Mérida; Attendance: 42,000; Referee: Carlos Chandía (CHI)

8 July Copa América Quarter-finals	Argentina	4–0	Peru	Barquisimeto
18:50 VET (UTC−4)	Riquelme 47', 85'; Messi 61'; Mascherano 75'	Report		Stadium: Estadio Metropolitano de Fútbol de Lara; Attendance: 38,800; Referee: Carlos Eugênio Simon (BRA)

22 August Friendly	Costa Rica	1–1	Peru	San José
	Rojas 7'	Report	García 57'	Stadium: Estadio Ricardo Saprissa Aymá

8 September Friendly	Peru	2–2	Colombia	Lima
	Guerrero 40', 90'	Report	Rentería 33'; Falcao 72'	Stadium: Estadio Monumental "U"; Attendance: 20,000; Referee: José Carpio (ECU)

12 September Friendly	Peru	2–0	Bolivia	Lima
	Vargas 15'; Guerrero 36'	Report		Stadium: Estadio Monumental "U"; Attendance: 15,000; Referee: Víctor Hugo Rivera (PER)

13 October 2010 FIFA World Cup qualification	Peru	0–0	Paraguay	Lima
20:00 PET (UTC−5)		Report		Stadium: Estadio Monumental "U"; Attendance: 50,000; Referee: Carlos Eugênio Simon (BRA)

17 October 2010 FIFA World Cup qualification	Chile	2–0	Peru	Santiago
19:10 CLT (UTC−3)	Suazo 11'; Fernández 51'	Report		Stadium: Estadio Nacional; Attendance: 58,000; Referee: Óscar Ruiz (COL)

18 November 2010 FIFA World Cup qualification	Peru	1–1	Brazil	Lima
16:10 PET (UTC−5)	Vargas 72'	Report	Kaká 41'	Stadium: Estadio Monumental "U"; Attendance: 45,847; Referee: Carlos Torres (PAR)

21 November 2010 FIFA World Cup qualification	Ecuador	5–1	Peru	Quito
16:30 ECT (UTC−5)	Ayoví 10', 48'; Kaviedes 24'; Méndez 44', 62'	Report	Mendoza 86'	Stadium: Estadio Olímpico Atahualpa; Attendance: 28,557; Referee: Carlos Chandía (CHI)

=== 2008 ===
6 February Friendly	Bolivia	2–1	Peru	La Paz
19:00 BOT (UTC−4)	Pedriel 65'; Reyes 88'	Report	García 70'	Stadium: Estadio Hernando Siles

26 March Friendly	Peru	3–1	Costa Rica	Iquitos
21:00 PET (UTC−5)	Rengifo 32'; Zambrano 46'; Hidalgo 51'	Report	Alpízar 37'	Stadium: Estadio Max Augustín; Referee: Georges Buckley (PER)

31 May Friendly	Spain	2–1	Peru	Huelva
16:00 CET (UTC+1)	Villa 37'; Capdevila 90+2'	Report	Rengifo 76'	Stadium: Nuevo Colombino; Attendance: 17,500; Referee: Dimitar Meckarovski (MKD)

8 June Friendly	Mexico	4–0	Peru	Chicago
20:00 CDT (UTC−5)	Arce 5', 28'; Guardado 8'; Vela 21'	Report		Stadium: Soldier Field; Attendance: 33,608; Referee: Mark Geiger (USA)

14 June 2010 FIFA World Cup qualification	Peru	1–1	Colombia	Lima
20:00 PET (UTC−5)	Mariño 40'	Report	Rodallega 8'	Stadium: Estadio Monumental "U"; Attendance: 25,000; Referee: Carlos Torres (PAR)

17 June 2010 FIFA World Cup qualification	Uruguay	6–0	Peru	Montevideo
19:00 UYT (UTC−3)	Forlán 8', 38' (pen.), 57'; Bueno 61', 69'; Abreu 90'	Report		Stadium: Centenario; Attendance: 20,016; Referee: Pablo Pozo (CHI)

6 September 2010 FIFA World Cup qualification	Peru	1–0	Venezuela	Lima
20:30 PET (UTC−5)	Alva 39'	Report		Stadium: Estadio Monumental "U"; Attendance: 25,500; Referee: Óscar Maldonado (BOL)

10 September 2010 FIFA World Cup qualification	Peru	1–1	Argentina	Lima
21:30 PET (UTC−5)	Fano 90+3'	Report	Cambiasso 82'	Stadium: Estadio Monumental "U"; Attendance: 40,000; Referee: Carlos Amarilla (PAR)

11 October 2010 FIFA World Cup qualification	Bolivia	3–0	Peru	La Paz
15:00 BOT (UTC−4)	Botero 4', 16'; García 81'	Report		Stadium: Estadio Hernando Siles; Attendance: 23,147; Referee: Hernando Buitrago (COL)

15 October 2010 FIFA World Cup qualification	Paraguay	1–0	Peru	Asunción
17:10 PYT (UTC−4)	Cardozo 81'	Report		Stadium: Defensores del Chaco; Attendance: 31,545; Referee: Sálvio Fagundes (BRA)

=== 2009 ===
6 February Friendly	El Salvador	1–0	Peru	Los Angeles
	Romero 24'	Report		Stadium: Los Angeles Memorial Coliseum

11 February Friendly	Peru	0–1	Paraguay	Lima
19:00 PET (UTC−5)		Report	Riveros 19'	Stadium: Estadio Alejandro Villanueva

29 March 2010 FIFA World Cup qualification	Peru	1–3	Chile	Lima
18:15 PET (UTC−5)	Fano 34'	Report	Sánchez 2'; Suazo 32' (pen.); Fernández 70'	Stadium: Estadio Monumental "U"; Attendance: 48,700; Referee: Carlos Amarilla (PAR)

1 April 2010 FIFA World Cup qualification	Brazil	3–0	Peru	Porto Alegre
22:10 BRT (UTC−3)	Luís Fabiano 18' (pen.), 27'; Melo 64'	Report		Stadium: Estádio Beira-Rio; Attendance: 55,000; Referee: Sergio Pezzotta (ARG)

7 June 2010 FIFA World Cup qualification	Peru	1–2	Ecuador	Lima
15:30 PET (UTC−5)	Vargas 52'	Report	Montero 38'; Tenorio 59'	Stadium: Estadio Monumental "U"; Attendance: 17,050; Referee: Carlos Torres (PAR)

10 June 2010 FIFA World Cup qualification	Colombia	1–0	Peru	Medellín
18:00 COT (UTC−5)	Falcao 25'	Report		Stadium: Estadio Atanasio Girardot; Attendance: 32,300; Referee: Carlos Eugênio Simon (BRA)

5 September 2010 FIFA World Cup qualification	Peru	1–0	Uruguay	Lima
15:30 PET (UTC−5)	Rengifo 86'	Report		Stadium: Estadio Monumental "U"; Attendance: 15,000; Referee: Carlos Chandía (CHI)

9 September 2010 FIFA World Cup qualification	Venezuela	3–1	Peru	Puerto la Cruz
20:30 VET (UTC−4:30)	Miku 33', 52'; Vargas 65'	Report	Fuenmayor 41' (o.g.)	Stadium: Estadio Olímpico Luis Ramos; Attendance: 31,703; Referee: Carlos Vera (ECUr)

10 October 2010 FIFA World Cup qualification	Argentina	2–1	Peru	Buenos Aires
18:30 ART (UTC−3)	Higuaín 48'; Palermo 90+2'	Report	Rengifo 89'	Stadium: Estadio Antonio V. Liberti; Attendance: 38,019; Referee: René Ortubé (BOL)

14 October 2010 FIFA World Cup qualification	Peru	1–0	Bolivia	Lima
15:00 PET (UTC−5)	Fano 54'	Report		Stadium: Estadio Alejandro Villanueva; Attendance: 4,373; Referee: Juan Soto (VEN)

18 November Friendly	Honduras	1–2	Peru	Miami Gardens
20:50 EST (UTC−5)	Suazo 47'	Report	Izaguirre 39' (o.g.); Rengifo 63'	Stadium: Land Shark Stadium; Attendance: 11,917; Referee: Edvin Jurisevic (USA)

=== 2010 ===
4 September Friendly	Canada	0–2	Peru	Toronto
17:30 EDT (UTC−4)		Report	Fernández 67'; Tragodara 71'	Stadium: BMO Field; Attendance: 10,619; Referee: Edvin Jurisevic (USA)

7 September Friendly	Jamaica	1–2	Peru	Fort Lauderdale
20:15 EDT (UTC−4)	Cummings 19'	Report	Phillips 4' (o.g.); Fernández 85'	Stadium: Lockhart Stadium; Attendance: 5,217; Referee: Terry Vaughn (USA)

8 October Friendly	Peru	2–0	Costa Rica	Lima
16:00 PET (UTC−5)	Ramírez 3'; Rengifo 6'	Report		Stadium: Estadio Alejandro Villanueva; Attendance: 15,000; Referee: Omar Ponce (ECU)

12 October Friendly	Panama	1–0	Peru	Panama City
21:00 EST (UTC−5)	Torres 77'	Report		Stadium: Estadio Rommel Fernández, Panama City; Attendance: 5,000; Referee: Ricardo Cerdas (CRC)

17 November Friendly	Colombia	1–1	Peru	Bogotá
19:00 COT (UTC−5)	Núñez 73'	Report	Ramírez 32'	Stadium: Estadio El Campín; Attendance: 6,900; Referee: Saul Laverni (ARG)

=== 2011 ===
8 February Friendly	Peru	1–0	Panama	Moquegua
14:45 PET (UTC−5)	Contreras 40'	Report		Stadium: Estadio 25 de Noviembre; Referee: Darío Ubríaco (URU)

29 March Friendly	Ecuador	0–0	Peru	The Hague
18:10 CET (UTC+1)		Report		Stadium: Kyocera Stadion; Referee: Eric Braamhaar (NED)

1 June Kirin Cup	Japan	0–0	Peru	Niigata
19:20 JST (UTC+9)		Report		Stadium: Niigata Stadium; Attendance: 39,048; Referee: Howard Webb (ENG)

4 June Kirin Cup	Czech Republic	0–0	Peru	Matsumoto
15:00 JST (UTC+9)		Report		Stadium: Matsumoto Stadium; Attendance: 7,592; Referee: Ryuji Sato (JPN)

4 July Copa América Group C	Uruguay	1–1	Peru	San Juan
19:15 ART (UTC−3)	Suárez 45'	Report	Guerrero 23'	Stadium: Estadio del Bicentenario; Attendance: 25,000; Referee: Wilmar Roldán (COL)

8 July Copa América Group C	Peru	1–0	Mexico	Mendoza
21:45 ART (UTC−3)	Guerrero 82'	Report		Stadium: Estadio Malvinas Argentinas; Attendance: 10,000; Referee: Sergio Pezzotta (ARG)

12 July Copa América Group C	Chile	1–0	Peru	Mendoza
19:15 ART (UTC−3)	Carrillo 90+2' (o.g.)	Report		Stadium: Estadio Malvinas Argentinas; Attendance: 42,000; Referee: Salvio Fagundes (BRA)

16 July Copa América Quarter-finals	Colombia	0–2 (a.e.t.)	Peru	Córdoba
16:00 ART (UTC−3)		Report	Lobatón 101'; Vargas 111'	Stadium: Estadio Mario Alberto Kempes; Attendance: 30,000; Referee: Francisco Chacón (MEX)

19 July Copa América Semi-finals	Peru	0–2	Uruguay	La Plata
21:45 ART (UTC−3)		Report	Suárez 52', 57'	Stadium: Estadio Ciudad de La Plata; Attendance: 25,000; Referee: Raúl Orosco (BOL)

23 July Copa América Third place play-off	Peru	4–1	Venezuela	La Plata
16:00 ART (UTC−3)	Chiroque 41'; Guerrero 63', 89', 90+2'	Report	Arango 78'	Stadium: Estadio Ciudad de La Plata; Attendance: 20,000; Referee: Wilmar Roldán (COL)

2 September Friendly	Peru	2–2	Bolivia	Lima
20:10 PET (UTC−5)	Cruzado 36'; Pizarro 81' (pen.)	Report	Escobar 5'; Cardozo 70'	Stadium: Estadio Nacional; Referee: Juan Soto (VEN)

5 September Friendly	Bolivia	0–0	Peru	La Paz
20:00 BOT (UTC−4)		Report		Stadium: Estadio Hernando Siles; Referee: Julio Quintana (PAR)

7 October 2014 FIFA World Cup qualification	Peru	2–0	Paraguay	Lima
20:15 PET (UTC−5)	Guerrero 46', 71'	Report		Stadium: Estadio Nacional; Attendance: 39,600; Referee: Sergio Pezzotta (ARG)

11 October 2014 FIFA World Cup qualification	Chile	4–2	Peru	Santiago
19:45 CLT (UTC−3)	Ponce 2'; Vargas 18'; Medel 48'; Suazo 63' (pen.)	Report	Pizarro 49'; Farfán 60'	Stadium: Estadio Monumental David Arellano; Attendance: 39,000; Referee: Raúl Orosco (BOL)

15 November 2014 FIFA World Cup qualification	Ecuador	2–0	Peru	Quito
16:00 ECT (UTC−5)	Méndez 69'; Benítez 88'	Report		Stadium: Estadio Olímpico Atahualpa; Attendance: 34,481; Referee: Jorge Larrionda (URU)

=== 2012 ===
29 February Friendly	Tunisia	1–1	Peru	Tunis
17:00 CET (UTC+1)	Ben Yahia 45'	Report	Pizarro 45+2' (pen.)	Stadium: Stade El Menzah; Attendance: 5,000; Referee: Cecil Fleischer (GHA)

21 March Copa del Pacífico	Chile	3–1	Peru	Arica
22:00 CLT (UTC−3)	Paredes 5'; Andía 43'; Mena 87'	Report	Galliquio 21'	Stadium: Estadio Carlos Dittborn; Attendance: 12,000; Referee: Julio Quintana (PAR)

11 April Copa del Pacífico	Peru	0–3	Chile	Tacna
21:15 PET (UTC−5)		Report	Mena 46'; Flores 64'; Carrasco 72'	Stadium: Estadio Jorge Basadre; Attendance: 20,000; Referee: Enrique Cáceres (PAR)

23 May Friendly	Peru	1–0	Nigeria	Lima
20:00 PET (UTC−5)	Guerrero 36'	Report		Stadium: Estadio Nacional; Referee: José Espinel (ECU)

3 June 2014 FIFA World Cup qualification	Peru	0–1	Colombia	Lima
17:00 PET (UTC−5)		Report	Rodríguez 51'	Stadium: Estadio Nacional; Attendance: 35,724; Referee: Néstor Pitana (ARG)

10 June 2014 FIFA World Cup qualification	Uruguay	4–2	Peru	Montevideo
15:30 UYT (UTC−3)	Suárez 15'; Pereira 29'; Rodríguez 62'; Eguren 90+3'	Report	Godín 40' (o.g.); Guerrero 48'	Stadium: Estadio Centenario; Attendance: 55,000; Referee: Leandro Vuaden (BRA)

15 August Friendly	Costa Rica	0–1	Peru	San José
		Report	Carrillo 8'	Stadium: Estadio Nacional; Referee: Armando Castro (HON)

7 September 2014 FIFA World Cup qualification	Peru	2–1	Venezuela	Lima
20:25 PET (UTC−5)	Farfán 47', 59'	Report	Arango 42'	Stadium: Estadio Nacional; Attendance: 34,703; Referee: Martín Vázquez (URU)

11 September 2014 FIFA World Cup qualification	Peru	1–1	Argentina	Lima
20:25 PET (UTC−5)	Zambrano 22'	Report	Higuaín 37'	Stadium: Estadio Nacional; Attendance: 34,111; Referee: Wilmar Roldán (COL)

12 October 2014 FIFA World Cup qualification	Bolivia	1–1	Peru	La Paz
16:00 BOT (UTC−4)	Chumacero 51'	Report	Mariño 21'	Stadium: Estadio Hernando Siles; Attendance: 36,500; Referee: Carlos Vera (ECU)

16 October 2014 FIFA World Cup qualification	Paraguay	1–0	Peru	Asunción
19:00 PYT (UTC−3)	Aguilar 52'	Report		Stadium: Estadio Defensores del Chaco; Attendance: 10,114; Referee: Pablo Lunati (ARG)

14 November Friendly	Honduras	0–0	Peru	Houston
19:50 CST (UTC−6)		Report		Stadium: BBVA Compass Stadium; Attendance: 9,142; Referee: David Gantar (CAN)

=== 2013 ===
6 February Friendly	Trinidad and Tobago	0–2	Peru	Port of Spain
			Pizarro 28'; Cruzado 85'	Stadium: Ato Boldon Stadium; Attendance: 10,000

22 March 2014 FIFA World Cup qualification	Peru	1–0	Chile	Lima
21:10 PET (UTC−5)	Farfán 87'	Report		Stadium: Estadio Nacional; Attendance: 43,000; Referee: Diego Abal (ARG)

26 March Friendly	Peru	3–0	Trinidad and Tobago	Lima
21:10 PET (UTC−5)	Reyna 39'; Hurtado 81'; Gonzáles 83'	Report		Stadium: Estadio Nacional; Attendance: 20,000; Referee: Diego Lara (ECU)

17 April Friendly	Mexico	0–0	Peru	San Francisco
23:00 PDT (UTC−7)		Report		Stadium: Candlestick Park; Attendance: 46,288; Referee: Ricardo Salazar (USA)

1 June Friendly	Panama	1–2	Peru	Panama City
15:30 EST (UTC−5)	Blackburn 73'	Report	Reyna 50'; Benavente 84'	Stadium: Estadio Rommel Fernández; Attendance: 4,000; Referee: Henry Bejarano (CRC)

7 June 2014 FIFA World Cup qualification	Peru	1–0	Ecuador	Lima
21:10 PET (UTC−5)	Pizarro 11'	Report		Stadium: Estadio Nacional; Attendance: 37,000; Referee: Marcelo Henrique (BRA)

11 June 2014 FIFA World Cup qualification	Colombia	2–0	Peru	Barranquilla
15:30 COT (UTC−5)	Falcao 13' (pen.); Gutiérrez 45'	Report		Stadium: Estadio Metropolitano Roberto Meléndez; Attendance: 42,265; Referee: Sandro Ricci (BRA)

14 August Friendly	South Korea	0–0	Peru	Suwon
20:00 KST (UTC+9)		Report		Stadium: Suwon World Cup Stadium; Attendance: 34,000; Referee: Abdul Malik Bin Abdul Bashir (SIN)

6 September 2014 FIFA World Cup qualification	Peru	1–2	Uruguay	Lima
21:30 PET (UTC−5)	Farfán 84'	Report	Suárez 43' (pen.), 67'	Stadium: Estadio Nacional; Attendance: 39,222; Referee: Patricio Loustau (ARG)

10 September 2014 FIFA World Cup qualification	Venezuela	3–2	Peru	Ciudad Guayana
19:25 VET (UTC−4:30)	Rondón 36'; González 59' (pen.); Otero 76'	Report	Hurtado 19'; Zambrano 86'	Stadium: Estadio Polideportivo Cachamay; Attendance: 20,049; Referee: Néstor Pitana (ARG)

11 October 2014 FIFA World Cup qualification	Argentina	3–1	Peru	Buenos Aires
20:00 ART (UTC−3)	Lavezzi 23', 34'; Palacio 47'	Report	Pizarro 20'	Stadium: Estadio Antonio Vespucio Liberti; Attendance: 28,977; Referee: Carlos Vera (ECU)

15 October 2014 FIFA World Cup qualification	Peru	1–1	Bolivia	Lima
21:15 PET (UTC−5)	Yotún 18'	Report	Bejarano 45'	Stadium: Estadio Nacional; Attendance: 0 (Note: Peru v Bolivia was played without spectators due to sanctions imposed by FIFA as a result of crowd disturbance incidents. The Peruvian Football Federation decided to withdraw their appeal and accepted the punishment.); Referee: Enrique Cáceres (PAR)

=== 2014 ===
30 May Friendly	England	3–0	Peru	London
20:00 BST (UTC+1)	Sturridge 32'; Cahill 65'; Jagielka 70'	Report		Stadium: Wembley Stadium; Attendance: 62,103; Referee: Viktor Kassai (HUN)

3 June Friendly	Switzerland	2–0	Peru	Lucerne
20:30 CET (UTC+1)	Lichtsteiner 78'; Shaqiri 84'	Report		Stadium: Swissporarena; Attendance: 15,000; Referee: Daniel Stefański (POL)

6 August Friendly	Peru	3–0	Panama	Lima
21:00 PET (UTC−5)	Ascues 44', 90'; Ramos 81'	Report		Stadium: Estadio Nacional; Attendance: 6,000; Referee: José Luís Espinel (ECU)

4 September Friendly	Iraq	0–2	Peru	Dubai
19:30 GST (UTC+4)		Report	Nadhim 18' (o.g.); Zambrano 26'	Stadium: Maktoum Bin Rashid Al Maktoum Stadium; Attendance: 2,000; Referee: Hamad Al Shaikh Hashmi (UAE)

9 September Friendly	Qatar	0–2	Peru	Doha
18:30 AST (UTC+3)		Report	Callens 84'; Guerrero 88'	Stadium: Khalifa International Stadium; Attendance: 4,000; Referee: Ionuț Avram (ROU)

10 October Friendly	Chile	3–0	Peru	Valparaíso
19:00 CLT (UTC−4)	Vargas 28', 53'; Medel 34'	Report		Stadium: Estadio Elías Figueroa Brander; Attendance: 17,000; Referee: Julio Quintana (PAR)

14 October Friendly	Peru	1–0	Guatemala	Lima
21:00 PET (UTC−5)	Ascues 35'	Report		Stadium: Estadio Alejandro Villanueva; Attendance: 1,000; Referee: Diego Lara (ECU)

14 November Friendly	Paraguay	2–1	Peru	Luque
19:00 PYT (UTC−4)	Romero 70'; González 90+2' (pen.)	Report	Guerrero 74'	Stadium: Estadio Feliciano Cáceres; Referee: Ricardo Ribeiro (BRA)

18 November Friendly	Peru	2–1	Paraguay	Lima
20:00 PET (UTC−5)	Ascues 73', 81'	Report	Santa Cruz 42'	Stadium: Estadio Nacional; Referee: Wilmar Roldán (COL)

=== 2015 ===
31 March Friendly	Peru	0–1	Venezuela	Fort Lauderdale
20:00 EDT (UTC−4)		Report	Martínez 60'	Stadium: Lockhart Stadium; Attendance: 10,000; Referee: Armando Castro (HON)

3 June Friendly	Peru	1–1	Mexico	Lima
20:00 PET (UTC−5)	Farfán 62'	Report	Valenzuela 75'	Stadium: Estadio Nacional; Attendance: 20,000; Referee: Omar Ponce (ECU)

14 June Copa América Group C	Brazil	2–1	Peru	Temuco
18:30 CLT (UTC−4)	Neymar 4'; Douglas Costa 90+1'	Report	Cueva 2'	Stadium: Estadio Municipal Germán Becker; Attendance: 16,342; Referee: Roberto García Orozco (MEX)

18 June Copa América Group C	Peru	1–0	Venezuela	Valparaíso
20:30 CLT (UTC−4)	Pizarro 72'	Report		Stadium: Estadio Elías Figueroa; Attendance: 15,542; Referee: Raúl Orosco (BOL)

21 June Copa América Group C	Colombia	0–0	Peru	Temuco
16:00 CLT (UTC−4)		Report		Stadium: Estadio Municipal Germán Becker; Attendance: 17,231; Referee: Néstor Pitana (ARG)

25 June Copa América Quarter-finals	Bolivia	1–3	Peru	Temuco
20:30 CLT (UTC−4)	Martins 83' (pen.)	Report	Guerrero 19', 22', 73'	Stadium: Estadio Municipal Germán Becker; Attendance: 16,872; Referee: Wilmar Roldán (COL)

29 June Copa América Semi-finals	Chile	2–1	Peru	Santiago
20:30 CLT (UTC−4)	Vargas 41', 63'	Report	Medel 60' (o.g.)	Stadium: Estadio Nacional; Attendance: 46,000; Referee: José Argote (VEN)

3 July Copa América Third place playoff	Peru	2–0	Paraguay	Concepción
20:30 CLT (UTC−4)	Carrillo 48'; Guerrero 89'	Report		Stadium: Estadio Municipal de Concepción; Attendance: 29,143; Referee: Raúl Orosco (BOL)

4 September Friendly	United States	2–1	Peru	Washington, D.C.
21:35 EDT (UTC−4)	Altidore 60', 68'	Report	Chávez 20'	Stadium: Robert F. Kennedy Memorial Stadium; Attendance: 28,896; Referee: Francisco Chacón (MEX)

8 September Friendly	Colombia	1–1	Peru	Harrison
20:10 EDT (UTC−4)	Bacca 37'	Report	Farfán 89' (pen.)	Stadium: Red Bull Arena; Attendance: 24,800; Referee: Chris Penso (USA)

8 October 2018 FIFA World Cup qualification	Colombia	2–0	Peru	Barranquilla
15:30 COT (UTC−5)	Gutiérrez 36'; Cardona 90+4'	Report		Stadium: Estadio Metropolitano Roberto Meléndez; Attendance: 44,000; Referee: Antonio Arias (PAR)

13 October 2018 FIFA World Cup qualification	Peru	3–4	Chile	Lima
21:15 PET (UTC−5)	Farfán 10', 36' (pen.); Guerrero 90+2'	Report	Sánchez 7', 44'; Vargas 41', 49'	Stadium: Estadio Nacional; Attendance: 39,180; Referee: Néstor Pitana (ARG)

13 November 2018 FIFA World Cup qualification	Peru	1–0	Paraguay	Lima
21:15 PET (UTC−5)	Farfán 20'	Report		Stadium: Estadio Nacional; Attendance: 26,000; Referee: Julio Bascuñán (CHI)

17 November 2018 FIFA World Cup qualification	Brazil	3–0	Peru	Salvador
21:00 BRT (UTC−3)	Douglas Costa 22'; Renato Augusto 57'; Filipe Luís 77'	Report		Stadium: Arena Fonte Nova; Attendance: 45,000; Referee: Hernando Buitrago (COL)

=== 2016 ===
24 March 2018 FIFA World Cup qualification	Peru	2–2	Venezuela	Lima
21:15 PET (UTC−5)	Guerrero 61'; Ruidíaz 90+4'	Report	Otero 33' (pen.); Villanueva 57'	Stadium: Estadio Nacional; Attendance: 35,459; Referee: Enrique Cáceres (PAR)

29 March 2018 FIFA World Cup qualification	Uruguay	1–0	Peru	Montevideo
20:00 UYT (UTC−3)	Cavani 53'	Report		Stadium: Estadio Centenario; Attendance: 55,000; Referee: Roddy Zambrano (ECU)

23 May Friendly	Peru	4–0	Trinidad and Tobago	Lima
21:30 PET (UTC−5)	Cueva 36' da Silva 39'; Flores 50'; Benavente 90+3' (pen.)	Report		Stadium: Estadio Nacional; Attendance: 20,000; Referee: Luis Sánchez (COL)

28 May Friendly	Peru	3–1	El Salvador	Washington, D.C.
21:30 EDT (UTC−4)	Ruidíaz 11'; Polo 60'; Yotún 90+3'	Report	Bonilla 81'	Stadium: Robert F. Kennedy Memorial Stadium; Attendance: 10,000; Referee: Valdin Legister (JAM)

4 June Copa América Centenario Group B	Haiti	0–1	Peru	Seattle
19:30 PST (UTC−8)		Report	Guerrero 61'	Stadium: CenturyLink Field; Attendance: 20,190; Referee: John Pitti (PAN)

8 June Copa América Centenario Group B	Ecuador	2–2	Peru	Phoenix
22:00 MST (UTC−7)	Valencia 39'; Bolaños 48'	Report	Cueva 5'; Flores 13'	Stadium: University of Phoenix Stadium; Attendance: 11,937; Referee: Wilmar Roldán (COL)

12 June Copa América Centenario Group B	Brazil	0–1	Peru	Foxborough
20:30 EST (UTC−5)		Report	Ruidíaz 75'	Stadium: Gillette Stadium; Attendance: 36,187; Referee: Andrés Cunha (URU)

17 June Copa América Centenario Quarter-finals	Peru	0–0 (2–4 p)	Colombia	East Rutherford
20:00 EST (UTC−5)		Report		Stadium: MetLife Stadium; Attendance: 79,194; Referee: Patricio Loustau (ARG)
	Penalties
	Ruidíaz (penalty scored); Tapia (penalty scored); Trauco (penalty missed); Cueva (penalty missed)		(penalty scored) Rodríguez; (penalty scored) Cuadrado; (penalty scored) Moreno; (penalty scored) Pérez

1 September 2018 FIFA World Cup qualification	Bolivia	0–3; Awarded (Note: Bolivia won the match 2-0 but fielded an ineligible player (Nelson Cabrera). FIFA awarded Peru a 3-0 victory by default.)	Peru	La Paz
16:00 BOT (UTC−4)	Escobar 38'; Raldes 88'	Report		Stadium: Estadio Hernando Siles; Attendance: 26,765; Referee: José Argote (VEN)

6 September 2018 FIFA World Cup qualification	Peru	2–1	Ecuador	Lima
21:15 PET (UTC−5)	Cueva 19' (pen.); Tapia 78'	Report	Achilier 31'	Stadium: Estadio Nacional; Attendance: 30,000; Referee: Wilmar Roldán (COL)

6 October 2018 FIFA World Cup qualification	Peru	2–2	Argentina	Lima
21:15 PET (UTC−5)	Guerrero 58'; Cueva 84' (pen.)	Report	Funes Mori 15'; Higuaín 77'	Stadium: Estadio Nacional; Attendance: 38,700; Referee: Sandro Ricci (BRA)

11 October 2018 FIFA World Cup qualification	Chile	2–1	Peru	Santiago
20:30 CLT (UTC−3)	Vidal 19', 85'	Report	Flores 76'	Stadium: Estadio Nacional; Attendance: 30,662; Referee: Roddy Alberto (ECU)

10 November 2018 FIFA World Cup qualification	Paraguay	1–4	Peru	Asunción
20:30 PYT (UTC−3)	Riveros 10'	Report	Ramos 49'; Flores 71'; Cueva 79'; Benítez 84' (o.g.)	Stadium: Estadio Defensores del Chaco; Attendance: 36,000; Referee: Patricio Loustau (ARG)

15 November 2018 FIFA World Cup qualification	Peru	0–2	Brazil	Lima
21:15 PET (UTC−5)		Report	Gabriel Jesus 58'; Renato Augusto 78'	Stadium: Estadio Nacional; Attendance: 38,700; Referee: Wilmar Roldán (COL)

=== 2017 ===
23 March 2018 FIFA World Cup qualification	Venezuela	2–2	Peru	Maturín
19:30 VET (UTC−4)	Villanueva 23'; Otero 39'	Report	Carrillo 46'; Guerrero 64'	Stadium: Estadio Monumental de Maturín; Attendance: 35,920; Referee: Enrique Cáceres (PAR)

28 March 2018 FIFA World Cup qualification	Peru	2–1	Uruguay	Lima
21:15 PET (UTC−5)	Guerrero 34'; Flores 62'	Report	Sánchez 30'	Stadium: Estadio Nacional; Attendance: 35,200; Referee: Julio Bascuñán (CHI)

8 June Friendly	Peru	1–0	Paraguay	Trujillo
17:00 PET (UTC−5)	Guerrero 75'	Report		Stadium: Estadio Mansiche; Attendance: 25,000; Referee: Carlos Orbe (ECU)

13 June Friendly	Peru	3–1	Jamaica	Arequipa
20:30 PET (UTC−5)	Flores 21'; Tapia 43'; Guerrero 58'	Report	Johnson 86' (pen.)	Stadium: Virgen de Chapi; Attendance: 40,000; Referee: Gustavo Murillo (COL)

31 August 2018 FIFA World Cup qualification	Peru	2–1	Bolivia	Lima
21:15 PET (UTC−5)	Flores 55'; Cueva 58'	Report	Álvarez 72'	Stadium: Monumental "U"; Attendance: 50,501; Referee: Andrés Cunha (URU)

5 September 2018 FIFA World Cup qualification	Ecuador	1–2	Peru	Quito
16:00 ECT (UTC−5)	Valencia 79' (pen.)	Report	Flores 71'; Hurtado 75'	Stadium: Estadio Olímpico Atahualpa; Attendance: 30,000; Referee: Enrique Cáceres (PAR)

5 October 2018 FIFA World Cup qualification	Argentina	0–0	Peru	Buenos Aires
20:30 ART (UTC−3)		Report		Stadium: La Bombonera; Attendance: 49,000; Referee: Wilton Sampaio (BRA)

10 October 2018 FIFA World Cup qualification	Peru	1–1	Colombia	Lima
18:30 PET (UTC−5)	Ospina 77' (o.g.)	Report	Rodríguez 55'	Stadium: Estadio Nacional; Attendance: 29,637; Referee: Sandro Ricci (BRA)

11 November OFC–CONMEBOL qualification play-off	New Zealand	0–0	Peru	Wellington
16:15 NZST (UTC+13)		Report		Stadium: Westpac Stadium; Attendance: 37,034; Referee: Mark Geiger (USA)

15 November OFC–CONMEBOL qualification play-off	Peru	2–0 (2–0 agg.)	New Zealand	Lima
21:15 PET (UTC−5)	Farfán 28'; Ramos 65'	Report		Stadium: Estadio Nacional; Attendance: 39,125; Referee: Clément Turpin (FRA)

=== 2018 ===
24 March Friendly	Peru	2–0	Croatia	Miami Gardens
20:30 EDT (UTC−4)	Carrillo 12'; Flores 48'	Report		Stadium: Hard Rock Stadium; Attendance: 46,893; Referee: Ismail Elfath (USA)

27 March Friendly	Peru	3–1	Iceland	Harrison
20:00 EDT (UTC−4)	Tapia 3'; Ruidíaz 58'; Farfán 75'	Report	Fjóluson 22'	Stadium: Red Bull Arena; Attendance: 25,219; Referee: Ted Unkel (USA)

29 May Friendly	Peru	2–0	Scotland	Lima
20:00 PET (UTC−5)	Cueva 37' (pen.); Farfán 47'	Report		Stadium: Estadio Nacional; Attendance: 40,000; Referee: Fernando Guerrero (MEX)

3 June Friendly	Saudi Arabia	0–3	Peru	St. Gallen
20:00 CEST (UTC+2)		Report	Carrillo 20'; Guerrero 41', 64'	Stadium: kybunpark Attendance: 18,053; Referee: Fedayi San (SUI)

9 June Friendly	Sweden	0–0	Peru	Gothenburg
20:15 CEST (UTC+2)		Report		Stadium: Ullevi; Attendance: 32,163; Referee: Svein Oddvar Moen (NOR)

16 June FIFA World Cup Group C	Peru	0–1	Denmark	Saransk
19:00 MSK (UTC+3)		Report	Poulsen 59'	Stadium: Mordovia Arena; Attendance: 40,502; Referee: Bakary Gassama (GAM)

21 June FIFA World Cup Group C	France	1–0	Peru	Yekaterinburg
20:00 YEKT (UTC+5)	Mbappé 34'	Report		Stadium: Central Stadium; Attendance: 32,789; Referee: Mohammed Abdulla Hassan Mohamed (UAE)

26 June FIFA World Cup Group C	Australia	0–2	Peru	Sochi
17:00 MSK (UTC+3)		Report	Carrillo 18'; Guerrero 50'	Stadium: Fisht Olympic Stadium; Attendance: 44,073; Referee: Sergei Karasev (RUS)

6 September Friendly	Netherlands	2–1	Peru	Amsterdam
20:45 CEST (UTC+2)	Depay 60', 83'	Report	Aquino 13'	Stadium: Johan Cruyff Arena; Attendance: 40,127; Referee: Tobias Stieler (GER)

9 September Friendly	Germany	2–1	Peru	Sinsheim
20:45 CEST (UTC+2)	Brandt 25'; Schulz 85'	Report	Advíncula 22'	Stadium: Rhein-Neckar-Arena; Attendance: 25,494; Referee: Robert Schörgenhofer (AUT)

12 October Friendly	Peru	3–0	Chile	Miami Gardens
20:30 EDT (UTC−4)	Roco 64' (o.g.); Aquino 75', 86'	Report		Stadium: Hard Rock Stadium; Attendance: 34,016; Referee: Armando Villarreal (USA)

16 October Friendly	United States	1–1	Peru	East Hartford
20:00 EDT (UTC−4)	Sargent 49'	Report	Flores 86'	Stadium: Pratt & Whitney Stadium; Attendance: 24,959; Referee: Ivan Barton (SLV)

15 November Friendly	Peru	0–2	Ecuador	Lima
20:30 PET (UTC−5)		Report	A. Valencia 47'; E. Valencia 74'	Stadium: Estadio Nacional; Attendance: 45,000; Referee: Leodán González (URU)

20 November Friendly	Peru	2–3	Costa Rica	Arequipa
19:30 PET (UTC−5)	Flores 20'; Farfán 73'	Report	McDonald 41'; Cruz 54'; Campbell 77' (pen.)	Stadium: Virgen de Chapi; Attendance: 40,000; Referee: Carlos Orbe (ECU)

=== 2019 ===
22 March Friendly	Peru	1–0	Paraguay	Harrison
20:00 EDT (UTC−4)	Cueva 4'	Report		Stadium: Red Bull Arena; Referee: Jair Marrufo (USA)

26 March Friendly	Peru	0–2	El Salvador	Washington, D.C.
20:00 EDT (UTC−4)		Report	Trauco 61' (o.g.); Cerén 90+1'	Stadium: Robert F. Kennedy Stadium; Referee: Kimbell Ward (SKN)

5 June Friendly	Peru	1–0	Costa Rica	Lima
20:00 PET (UTC−5)	Cueva 53'	Report		Stadium: Monumental "U"; Referee: Darío Herrera (ARG)

9 June Friendly	Peru	0–3	Colombia	Lima
16:00 PET (UTC−5)		Report	Uribe 23', 65'; Zapata 90+4'	Stadium: Monumental "U"; Referee: Christian Ferreyra (URU)

15 June Copa América Group A	Venezuela	0–0	Peru	Porto Alegre
16:00 BRT (UTC−3)		Report		Stadium: Arena do Grêmio; Attendance: 13,370; Referee: Wilmar Roldán (COL)

18 June Copa América Group A	Bolivia	1–3	Peru	Rio
18:30 BRT (UTC−3)	Martins 28' (pen.)	Report	Guerrero 45'; Farfán 55'; Flores 90+6'	Stadium: Maracanã; Attendance: 26,346; Referee: Roddy Zambrano (ECU)

22 June Copa América Group A	Peru	0–5	Brazil	São Paulo
16:00 BRT (UTC−3)		Report	Casemiro 12'; Firmino 19'; Everton 32'; Dani Alves 53'; Willian 90'	Stadium: Arena Corinthians; Attendance: 42,317; Referee: Fernando Rapallini (ARG)

29 June Copa América Quarter-finals	Uruguay	0–0 (4–5 p)	Peru	Salvador
16:00 BRT (UTC−3)		Report		Stadium: Fonte Nova; Attendance: 21,180; Referee: Wilton Sampaio (BRA)
	Penalties
	Suárez (penalty missed); Cavani (penalty scored); Stuani (penalty scored); Bentancur (penalty scored); Torreira (penalty scored)		(penalty scored) Guerrero; (penalty scored) Ruidíaz; (penalty scored) Yotún; (penalty scored) Advíncula; (penalty scored) Flores

3 July Copa América Semi-finals	Chile	0–3	Peru	Porto Alegre
21:30 BRT (UTC−3)		Report	Flores 21'; Yotún 38'; Guerrero 90+1'	Stadium: Arena do Grêmio; Attendance: 33,058; Referee: Wilmar Roldán (COL)

7 July Copa América Final	Brazil	3–1	Peru	Rio
17:00 BRT (UTC−3)	Everton 15'; Gabriel Jesus 45+3'; Richarlison 90' (pen.)	Report	Guerrero 44' (pen.)	Stadium: Maracanã; Attendance: 69,968; Referee: Roberto Tobar (CHI)

5 September Friendly	Peru	0–1	Ecuador	Harrison
20:00 EDT (UTC−4)		Report	Castillo 47'	Stadium: Red Bull Arena; Attendance: 21,428; Referee: Armando Villarreal (USA)

10 September Brasil Global Tour	Brazil	0–1	Peru	Los Angeles
20:00 PDT (UTC−7)		Report	Abram 85'	Stadium: Los Angeles Memorial Coliseum; Attendance: 32,287; Referee: Jair Marrufo (USA)

11 October Friendly	Uruguay	1–0	Peru	Montevideo
20:00 UYT (UTC−3)	Rodríguez 17'	Report		Stadium: Centenario; Referee: Arnaldo Samaniego (PAR)

15 October Friendly	Peru	1–1	Uruguay	Lima
20:30 PET (UTC−5)	Gonzáles 34'	Report	Núñez 80'	Stadium: Estadio Nacional; Referee: Carlos Mario Herrera (COL)

15 November Friendly	Colombia	1–0	Peru	Miami Gardens
20:30 EST (UTC−5)	Morelos 90+3'	Report		Stadium: Hard Rock Stadium; Attendance: 36,063; Referee: Jair Marrufo (USA)

== See also ==
- Peru national football team results (2020–present)
