= 2010 FIFA World Cup qualification (CONMEBOL) =

Tournament details
- Dates: 13 October 2007 – 18 November 2009
- Teams: 10 (from 1 confederation)

Tournament statistics
- Matches played: 90
- Goals scored: 232 (2.58 per match)
- Attendance: 3,301,363 (36,682 per match)
- Top scorer(s): (Chile) Humberto Suazo (10 goals)

The South American zone of 2010 FIFA World Cup qualification saw ten teams competing for places in the finals in South Africa. The format is identical to that used for the previous three World Cup qualification tournaments held by CONMEBOL. Matches were scheduled so that there were always two games within a week, which was aimed at minimizing player travel time, particularly for players who were based in Europe.

The top four teams in the final standings qualified automatically for the 2010 FIFA World Cup. The fifth-placed team met the fourth-placed team from the CONCACAF qualifying tournament in a two-legged play-off for a place at the World Cup.

== Standings ==
Pos	Team	Pld	W	D	L	GF	GA	GD	Pts	Qualification	Brazil national football team	Chile national football team	Paraguay national football team	Argentina national football team	Uruguay national football team	Ecuador national football team	Colombia national football team	Venezuela national football team	Bolivia national football team	Peru national football team
1	Brazil	18	9	7	2	33	11	+22	34	2010 FIFA World Cup	—	4–2	2–1	0–0	2–1	5–0	0–0	0–0	0–0	3–0
2	Chile	18	10	3	5	32	22	+10	33	2010 FIFA World Cup	0–3	—	0–3	1–0	0–0	1–0	4–0	2–2	4–0	2–0
3	Paraguay	18	10	3	5	24	16	+8	33	2010 FIFA World Cup	2–0	0–2	—	1–0	1–0	5–1	0–2	2–0	1–0	1–0
4	Argentina	18	8	4	6	23	20	+3	28	2010 FIFA World Cup	1–3	2–0	1–1	—	2–1	1–1	1–0	4–0	3–0	2–1
5	Uruguay	18	6	6	6	28	20	+8	24	Inter-confederation play-offs	0–4	2–2	2–0	0–1	—	0–0	3–1	1–1	5–0	6–0
6	Ecuador	18	6	5	7	22	26	−4	23		1–1	1–0	1–1	2–0	1–2	—	0–0	0–1	3–1	5–1
7	Colombia	18	6	5	7	14	18	−4	23		0–0	2–4	0–1	2–1	0–1	2–0	—	1–0	2–0	1–0
8	Venezuela	18	6	4	8	23	29	−6	22		0–4	2–3	1–2	0–2	2–2	3–1	2–0	—	5–3	3–1
9	Bolivia	18	4	3	11	22	36	−14	15		2–1	0–2	4–2	6–1	2–2	1–3	0–0	0–1	—	3–0
10	Peru	18	3	4	11	11	34	−23	13		1–1	1–3	0–0	1–1	1–0	1–2	1–1	1–0	1–0	—

Source: FIFA

On 24 November 2008, FIFA suspended the Peruvian Football Federation from all international competition due to governmental interference in its operations. The suspension was lifted on 20 December 2008.

== Matches ==
The round-by-round fixtures were same as the 2002 and 2006 qualifying tournament.

=== Matchday 1 ===
13 October 2007
16:30 UTC–2

Uruguay	5–0	Bolivia
Suárez 4'; Forlán 38'; Abreu 48'; Sánchez 67'; Bueno 83'	Report

Estadio Centenario, Montevideo
Attendance: 25,200
Referee: Rubén Selman (Chile)

13 October 2007
17:40 UTC–3

Argentina	2–0	Chile
Riquelme 27', 45'	Report

Estadio Monumental Antonio Vespucio Liberti, Buenos Aires
Attendance: 55,000
Referee: Martín Vásquez (Uruguay)

13 October 2007
17:50 UTC–5

Ecuador	0–1	Venezuela
	Report	Rey 68'

Estadio Olímpico Atahualpa, Quito
Attendance: 29,644
Referee: René Ortubé (Bolivia)

13 October 2007
20:00 UTC–5

Peru	0–0	Paraguay
	Report

Estadio Monumental, Lima
Attendance: 50,000
Referee: Carlos Simon (Brazil)

14 October 2007
16:00 UTC–5

Colombia	0–0	Brazil
	Report

Estadio El Campín, Bogotá
Attendance: 41,000
Referee: Carlos Amarilla (Paraguay)

=== Matchday 2 ===
16 October 2007
20:40 UTC–4

Venezuela	0–2	Argentina
	Report	Milito 16'; Messi 43'

Estadio José Pachencho Romero, Maracaibo
Attendance: 10,600
Referee: Carlos Eugênio Simon (Brazil)

17 October 2007
16:00 UTC–4

Bolivia	0–0	Colombia
	Report

Estadio Hernando Siles, La Paz
Attendance: 19,469
Referee: Mauricio Reinoso (Ecuador)

17 October 2007
19:10 UTC–3

Chile	2–0	Peru
Suazo 11'; Fernández 51'	Report

Estadio Nacional, Santiago
Attendance: 58,000
Referee: Óscar Ruiz (Colombia)

17 October 2007
18:10 UTC–4

Paraguay	1–0	Uruguay
Valdez 14'	Report

Estadio Defensores del Chaco, Asunción
Attendance: 23,200
Referee: Héctor Baldassi (Argentina)

17 October 2007
21:45 UTC–2

Brazil	5–0	Ecuador
Vágner Love 19'; Ronaldinho 71'; Kaká 77', 85'; Elano 83'	Report

Estádio do Maracanã, Rio de Janeiro
Attendance: 87,000
Referee: Jorge Larrionda (Uruguay)

=== Matchday 3 ===
17 November 2007
16:00 UTC–3

Argentina	3–0	Bolivia
Agüero 40'; Riquelme 56', 74'	Report

Estadio Monumental Antonio Vespucio Liberti, Buenos Aires
Attendance: 43,308
Referee: Victor Hugo Rivera (Peru)

17 November 2007
16:10 UTC–5

Colombia	1–0	Venezuela
Bustos 82'	Report

Estadio El Campín, Bogotá
Attendance: 28,273
Referee: Rubén Selman (Chile)

17 November 2007
20:10 UTC–3

Paraguay	5–1	Ecuador
Valdez 8'; Riveros 26', 87'; Santa Cruz 50'; Ayala 82'	Report	Kaviedes 79'

Estadio Defensores del Chaco, Asunción
Attendance: 25,433
Referee: Héber Lopes (Brazil)

18 November 2007
17:00 UTC–2

Uruguay	2–2	Chile
Suárez 42'; Abreu 81'	Report	Salas 59', 70' (pen.)

Estadio Centenario, Montevideo
Attendance: 35,000
Referee: Sergio Pezzotta (Argentina)

18 November 2007
16:10 UTC–5

Peru	1–1	Brazil
Vargas 72'	Report	Kaká 41'

Estadio Monumental, Lima
Attendance: 45,847
Referee: Carlos Torres (Paraguay)

=== Matchday 4 ===
20 November 2007
18:40 UTC–4

Venezuela	5–3	Bolivia
Arismendi 20', 40'; Guerra 81'; Maldonado 89', 90+1'	Report	Moreno 19', 77'; Arce 27'

Estadio Polideportivo de Pueblo Nuevo, San Cristóbal
Attendance: 18,632
Referee: Sálvio Fagundes (Brazil)

20 November 2007
19:50 UTC–5

Colombia	2–1	Argentina
Bustos 62'; D. Moreno 82'	Report	Messi 36'

Estadio El Campín, Bogotá
Attendance: 41,700
Referee: Jorge Larrionda (Uruguay)

21 November 2007
16:30 UTC–5

Ecuador	5–1	Peru
Ayoví 10', 48'; Kaviedes 24'; Méndez 44', 62'	Report	Mendoza 86'

Estadio Olímpico Atahualpa, Quito
Attendance: 28,557
Referee: Carlos Chandía (Chile)

21 November 2007
21:45 UTC–2

Brazil	2–1	Uruguay
Luís Fabiano 45', 64'	Report	Abreu 9'

Estádio do Morumbi, São Paulo
Attendance: 70,000
Referee: Héctor Baldassi (Argentina)

21 November 2007
22:30 UTC–3

Chile	0–3	Paraguay
	Report	Cabañas 24'; Da Silva 45+1', 56'

Estadio Nacional, Santiago
Attendance: 52,320
Referee: Óscar Ruiz (Colombia)

=== Matchday 5 ===
14 June 2008
16:00 UTC–3

Uruguay	1–1	Venezuela
Lugano 12'	Report	Vargas 56'

Estadio Centenario, Montevideo
Attendance: 41,831
Referee: Alfredo Intriago (Ecuador)

14 June 2008
20:00 UTC–5

Peru	1–1	Colombia
Mariño 40'	Report	Rodallega 8'

Estadio Monumental "U", Lima
Attendance: 25,000
Referee: Carlos Torres (Paraguay)

15 June 2008
15:00 UTC–4

Paraguay	2–0	Brazil
Santa Cruz 26'; Cabañas 49'	Report

Estadio Defensores del Chaco, Asunción
Attendance: 38,000
Referee: Jorge Larrionda (Uruguay)

15 June 2008
18:10 UTC–3

Argentina	1–1	Ecuador
Palacio 90+3'	Report	Urrutia 69'

Estadio Monumental Antonio Vespucio Liberti, Buenos Aires
Attendance: 41,167
Referee: René Ortubé (Bolivia)

15 June 2008
19:30 UTC–4

Bolivia	0–2	Chile
	Report	Medel 29', 76'

Estadio Hernando Siles, La Paz
Attendance: 27,722
Referee: Victor Hugo Rivera (Peru)

=== Matchday 6 ===
17 June 2008
19:00 UTC−3

Uruguay	6–0	Peru
Forlán 8', 38' (pen.), 57'; Bueno 61', 69'; Abreu 90'	Report

Estadio Centenario, Montevideo
Attendance: 20,016
Referee: Pablo Pozo (Chile)

18 June 2008
16:10 UTC−4

Bolivia	4–2	Paraguay
Botero 23', 70'; R. García 25'; Moreno 76'	Report	Santa Cruz 66'; Valdez 82'

Estadio Hernando Siles, La Paz
Attendance: 8,561
Referee: Leonardo Gaciba (Brazil)

18 June 2008
17:00 UTC−5

Ecuador	0–0	Colombia
	Report

Estadio Olímpico Atahualpa, Quito
Attendance: 33,588
Referee: Héctor Baldassi (Argentina)

18 June 2008
21:50 UTC−3

Brazil	0–0	Argentina
	Report

Estádio Governador Magalhães Pinto (Mineirão), Belo Horizonte
Attendance: 65,000
Referee: Óscar Ruiz (Colombia)

19 June 2008
20:00 UTC−4:30

Venezuela	2–3	Chile
Maldonado 59'; Arango 80'	Report	Suazo 65' (pen.), 90+2'; Jara 72'

Estadio José Antonio Anzoátegui, Puerto la Cruz
Attendance: 38,000
Referee: Roberto Silvera (Uruguay)

=== Matchday 7 ===
6 September 2008
16:00 UTC−3

Argentina	1–1	Paraguay
Agüero 60'	Report	Heinze 13' (o.g.)

Estadio Monumental Antonio Vespucio Liberti, Buenos Aires
Attendance: 46,250
Referee: Carlos Simon (Brazil)

6 September 2008
16:10 UTC−5

Ecuador	3–1	Bolivia
Caicedo 21'; Méndez 51' (pen.); Benítez 72'	Report	Botero 40'

Estadio Olímpico Atahualpa, Quito
Attendance: 35,000
Referee: Pablo Pozo (Chile)

6 September 2008
18:20 UTC−5

Colombia	0–1	Uruguay
	Report	Eguren 15'

Estadio El Campín, Bogotá
Attendance: 35,024
Referee: Leonardo Gaciba (Brazil)

6 September 2008
20:30 UTC−5

Peru	1–0	Venezuela
Alva 39'	Report

Estadio Monumental, Lima
Attendance: 25,500
Referee: Óscar Maldonado (Bolivia)

7 September 2008
21:00 UTC−4

Chile	0–3	Brazil
	Report	Luís Fabiano 21', 83'; Robinho 45'

Estadio Nacional, Santiago
Attendance: 60,239
Referee: Carlos Torres (Paraguay)

=== Matchday 8 ===
9 September 2008
20:00 UTC−4

Paraguay	2–0	Venezuela
Riveros 28'; Valdez 45'	Report

Estadio Defensores del Chaco, Asunción
Attendance: 31,867
Referee: Héctor Baldassi (Argentina)

10 September 2008
17:40 UTC−3

Uruguay	0–0	Ecuador
	Report

Estadio Centenario, Montevideo
Attendance: 45,000
Referee: Óscar Ruiz (Colombia)

10 September 2008
18:40 UTC−4

Chile	4–0	Colombia
Jara 26'; Suazo 38'; Fuentes 48'; Fernández 71'	Report

Estadio Nacional, Santiago
Attendance: 47,459
Referee: Jorge Larrionda (Uruguay)

10 September 2008
21:50 UTC−3

Brazil	0–0	Bolivia
	Report

Estádio Olímpico João Havelange, Rio de Janeiro
Attendance: 31,422
Referee: Alfredo Intriago (Ecuador)

10 September 2008
21:30 UTC−5

Peru	1–1	Argentina
Fano 90+3'	Report	Cambiasso 82'

Estadio Monumental, Lima
Attendance: 40,000
Referee: Carlos Amarilla (Paraguay)

=== Matchday 9 ===
11 October 2008
15:00 UTC−4

Bolivia	3–0	Peru
Botero 4', 16'; R. García 81'	Report

Estadio Hernando Siles, La Paz
Attendance: 23,147
Referee: Hernando Buitrago (Colombia)

11 October 2008
18:10 UTC−3

Argentina	2–1	Uruguay
Messi 6'; Agüero 13'	Report	Lugano 40'

Estadio Monumental Antonio Vespucio Liberti, Buenos Aires
Attendance: 42,421
Referee: Carlos Torres (Paraguay)

11 October 2008
18:20 UTC−5

Colombia	0–1	Paraguay
	Report	Cabañas 9'

Estadio El Campín, Bogotá
Attendance: 26,000
Referee: Pablo Lunati (Argentina)

12 October 2008
15:30 UTC−4:30

Venezuela	0–4	Brazil
	Report	Kaká 6'; Robinho 10', 67'; Adriano 19'

Estadio Polideportivo de Pueblo Nuevo, San Cristóbal
Attendance: 38,000
Referee: Victor Hugo Rivera (Peru)

12 October 2008
16:55 UTC−5

Ecuador	1–0	Chile
Benítez 71'	Report

Estadio Olímpico Atahualpa, Quito
Attendance: 33,079
Referee: Martín Vásquez (Uruguay)

=== Matchday 10 ===
14 October 2008
16:00 UTC−4

Bolivia	2–2	Uruguay
Moreno 15', 42'	Report	Bueno 64'; Abreu 88'

Estadio Hernando Siles, La Paz
Attendance: 21,075
Referee: Héctor Baldassi (Argentina)

15 October 2008
17:10 UTC−4

Paraguay	1–0	Peru
Cardozo 81'	Report

Estadio Defensores del Chaco, Asunción
Attendance: 31,545
Referee: Sálvio Fagundes (Brazil)

15 October 2008
20:15 UTC−3

Chile	1–0	Argentina
Orellana 35'	Report

Estadio Nacional, Santiago
Attendance: 65,000
Referee: Óscar Ruiz (Colombia)

15 October 2008
22:00 UTC−3

Brazil	0–0	Colombia
	Report

Estádio do Maracanã, Rio de Janeiro
Attendance: 54,910
Referee: Rubén Selman (Chile)

15 October 2008
20:30 UTC−4:30

Venezuela	3–1	Ecuador
Maldonado 48'; Moreno 56'; Arango 67'	Report	Mina 12'

Estadio José Antonio Anzoátegui, Puerto la Cruz
Attendance: 10,581
Referee: Enrique Osses (Chile)

=== Matchday 11 ===
28 March 2009
17:00 UTC−3

Uruguay	2–0	Paraguay
Forlán 28'; Lugano 57'	Report

Estadio Centenario, Montevideo
Attendance: 45,000
Referee: Carlos Simon (Brazil)

28 March 2009
19:15 UTC−3

Argentina	4–0	Venezuela
Messi 26'; Tevez 47'; Rodríguez 51'; Agüero 73'	Report

Estadio Monumental Antonio Vespucio Liberti, Buenos Aires
Attendance: 46,085
Referee: Victor Hugo Rivera (Peru)

28 March 2009
19:30 UTC−5

Colombia	2–0	Bolivia
Torres 26'; Rentería 88'	Report

Estadio El Campín, Bogotá
Attendance: 22,044
Referee: Alfredo Intriago (Ecuador)

29 March 2009
16:00 UTC−5

Ecuador	1–1	Brazil
Noboa 89'	Report	Júlio Baptista 72'

Estadio Olímpico Atahualpa, Quito
Attendance: 40,000
Referee: Carlos Chandía (Chile)

29 March 2009
18:15 UTC−5

Peru	1–3	Chile
Fano 34'	Report	Sánchez 2'; Suazo 32' (pen.); Fernández 70'

Estadio Monumental, Lima
Attendance: 48,700
Referee: Carlos Amarilla (Paraguay)

=== Matchday 12 ===
31 March 2009
20:00 UTC−4:30

Venezuela	2–0	Colombia
Miku 78'; Arango 82'	Report

Estadio Polideportivo Cachamay, Ciudad Guayana
Attendance: 35,000
Referee: Pablo Pozo (Chile)

1 April 2009
15:30 UTC−4

Bolivia	6–1	Argentina
Moreno 12'; Botero 34' (pen.), 55', 66'; Da Rosa 45'; Torrico 87'	Report	González 25'

Estadio Hernando Siles, La Paz
Attendance: 30,487
Referee: Martín Vázquez (Uruguay)

1 April 2009
16:20 UTC−5

Ecuador	1–1	Paraguay
Noboa 63'	Report	É. Benítez 90+2'

Estadio Olímpico Atahualpa, Quito
Attendance: 36,853
Referee: Wilmar Roldán (Colombia)

1 April 2009
19:10 UTC−4

Chile	0–0	Uruguay
	Report

Estadio Nacional, Santiago
Attendance: 55,000
Referee: Héctor Baldassi (Argentina)

1 April 2009
22:10 UTC−3

Brazil	3–0	Peru
Luís Fabiano 18' (pen.), 27'; Felipe Melo 64'	Report

Estádio Beira-Rio, Porto Alegre
Attendance: 55,000
Referee: Sergio Pezzotta (Argentina)

=== Matchday 13 ===
6 June 2009
16:00 UTC−3

Uruguay	0–4	Brazil
	Report	Dani Alves 12'; Juan 36'; Luís Fabiano 52'; Kaká 75' (pen.)

Estadio Centenario, Montevideo
Attendance: 52,000
Referee: Saúl Laverni (Argentina)

6 June 2009
16:50 UTC−4

Bolivia	0–1	Venezuela
	Report	Rivero 33' (o.g.)

Estadio Hernando Siles, La Paz
Attendance: 23,427
Referee: Carlos Vera (Ecuador)

6 June 2009
18:00 UTC−3

Argentina	1–0	Colombia
Díaz 56'	Report

Estadio Monumental Antonio Vespucio Liberti, Buenos Aires
Attendance: 55,000
Referee: René Ortubé (Bolivia)

6 June 2009
19:10 UTC−4

Paraguay	0–2	Chile
	Report	Fernández 13'; Suazo 50'

Estadio Defensores del Chaco, Asunción
Attendance: 34,000
Referee: Sergio Pezzotta (Argentina)

7 June 2009
15:30 UTC−5

Peru	1–2	Ecuador
Vargas 52'	Report	Montero 38'; Tenorio 59'

Estadio Monumental, Lima
Attendance: 17,050
Referee: Carlos Torres (Paraguay)

=== Matchday 14 ===
10 June 2009
16:00 UTC−5

Ecuador	2–0	Argentina
Ayoví 72'; Palacios 83'	Report

Estadio Olímpico Atahualpa, Quito
Attendance: 36,359
Referee: Carlos Chandía (Chile)

10 June 2009
18:00 UTC−5

Colombia	1–0	Peru
Falcao 25'	Report

Estadio Atanasio Girardot, Medellín
Attendance: 32,300
Referee: Carlos Simon (Brazil)

10 June 2009
21:50 UTC−3

Brazil	2–1	Paraguay
Robinho 40'; Nilmar 49'	Report	Cabañas 25'

Estádio do Arruda, Recife
Attendance: 56,682
Referee: Óscar Ruiz (Colombia)

10 June 2009
21:00 UTC−4

Chile	4–0	Bolivia
Beausejour 43'; Estrada 74'; Sánchez 78', 88'	Report

Estadio Nacional, Santiago
Attendance: 60,214
Referee: Roberto Silvera (Uruguay)

10 June 2009
20:30 UTC−4:30

Venezuela	2–2	Uruguay
Maldonado 9'; Rey 74'	Report	Suárez 60'; Forlán 72'

Estadio Polideportivo Cachamay, Ciudad Guayana
Attendance: 37,000
Referee: Sálvio Fagundes (Brazil)

=== Matchday 15 ===
5 September 2009
15:30 UTC−5

Colombia	2–0	Ecuador
Martínez 82'; Gutiérrez 90+4'	Report

Estadio Atanasio Girardot, Medellín
Attendance: 42,000
Referee: Sergio Pezzotta (Argentina)

5 September 2009
15:30 UTC−5

Peru	1–0	Uruguay
Rengifo 86'	Report

Estadio Monumental, Lima
Attendance: 15,000
Referee: Carlos Chandía (Chile)

5 September 2009
18:30 UTC−4

Paraguay	1–0	Bolivia
Cabañas 45+1' (pen.)	Report

Estadio Defensores del Chaco, Asunción
Attendance: 25,094
Referee: Víctor Hugo Carrillo (Peru)

5 September 2009
21:30 UTC−3

Argentina	1–3	Brazil
Dátolo 65'	Report	Luisão 23'; Luís Fabiano 30', 68'

Estadio Gigante de Arroyito, Rosario
Attendance: 37,000
Referee: Óscar Ruiz (Colombia)

5 September 2009
21:30 UTC−4

Chile	2–2	Venezuela
Vidal 11'; Millar 53'	Report	Maldonado 34'; Rey 45+1'

Estadio Monumental David Arellano, Santiago
Attendance: 44,000
Referee: René Ortubé (Bolivia)

=== Matchday 16 ===
9 September 2009
14:00 UTC−4

Bolivia	1–3	Ecuador
Yecerotte 85'	Report	Méndez 4'; Valencia 46'; Benítez 66'

Estadio Hernando Siles, La Paz
Attendance: 10,200
Referee: Héctor Baldassi (Argentina)

9 September 2009
18:00 UTC−3

Uruguay	3–1	Colombia
Suárez 7'; Scotti 77'; Eguren 87'	Report	Martínez 63'

Estadio Centenario, Montevideo
Attendance: 30,000
Referee: Carlos Torres (Paraguay)

9 September 2009
19:00 UTC−4

Paraguay	1–0	Argentina
Valdez 27'	Report

Estadio Defensores del Chaco, Asunción
Attendance: 38,000
Referee: Sálvio Fagundes (Brazil)

9 September 2009
22:15 UTC−3

Brazil	4–2	Chile
Nilmar 31', 74', 76'; Baptista 40'	Report	Suazo 45+1' (pen.), 52'

Estádio de Pituaçu, Salvador
Attendance: 30,000
Referee: Jorge Larrionda (Uruguay)

9 September 2009
20:30 UTC−4:30

Venezuela	3–1	Peru
Miku 33', 52'; Vargas 65'	Report	Fuenmayor 41' (o.g.)

Estadio José Antonio Anzoátegui, Puerto la Cruz
Attendance: 31,703
Referee: Carlos Vera (Ecuador)

=== Matchday 17 ===
10 October 2009
19:00 UTC−3

Argentina	2–1	Peru
Higuaín 48'; Palermo 90+2'	Report	Rengifo 89'

Estadio Monumental Antonio Vespucio Liberti, Buenos Aires
Attendance: 38,019
Referee: René Ortubé (Bolivia)

10 October 2009
17:00 UTC−5

Colombia	2–4	Chile
Martínez 14'; G. Moreno 63'	Report	Ponce 34'; Suazo 35'; Valdivia 71'; Orellana 78'

Estadio Atanasio Girardot, Medellín
Attendance: 18,000
Referee: Victor Hugo Rivera (Peru)

10 October 2009
17:00 UTC−5

Ecuador	1–2	Uruguay
Valencia 68'	Report	Suárez 69'; Forlán 90+3' (pen.)

Estadio Olímpico Atahualpa, Quito
Attendance: 42,700
Referee: Salvio Fagundes (Brazil)

10 October 2009
17:30 UTC−4:30

Venezuela	1–2	Paraguay
A. Rondón 85'	Report	Cabañas 56'; Cardozo 80'

Estadio Polideportivo Cachamay, Ciudad Guayana
Attendance: 41,680
Referee: Carlos Chandía (Chile)

11 October 2009
16:00 UTC−4

Bolivia	2–1	Brazil
Olivares 10'; Moreno 32'	Report	Nilmar 70'

Estadio Hernando Siles, La Paz
Attendance: 16,557
Referee: Pablo Pozo (Chile)

=== Matchday 18 ===
14 October 2009
15:00 UTC−5

Peru	1–0	Bolivia
Fano 54'	Report

Estadio Alejandro Villanueva, Lima
Attendance: 4,373
Referee: Juan Soto (Venezuela)

14 October 2009
18:00 UTC−4

Brazil	0–0	Venezuela
	Report

Morenão, Campo Grande
Attendance: 23,746
Referee: Víctor Hugo Carrillo (Peru)

14 October 2009
19:00 UTC−3

Chile	1–0	Ecuador
Suazo 53'	Report

Estadio Monumental David Arellano, Santiago
Attendance: 47,000
Referee: Carlos Torres (Paraguay)

14 October 2009
20:00 UTC−2

Uruguay	0–1	Argentina
	Report	Bolatti 84'

Estadio Centenario, Montevideo
Attendance: 60,000
Referee: Carlos Amarilla (Paraguay)

14 October 2009
20:00 UTC−4

Paraguay	0–2	Colombia
	Report	Ramos 61'; Rodallega 80'

Estadio Defensores del Chaco, Asunción
Attendance: 17,503
Referee: Paulo César de Oliveira (Brazil)

== Inter-confederation play-offs ==
The team from fourth place in the CONCACAF qualifying fourth round (Costa Rica) entered into a home and away play-off against the team which finished fifth in the CONMEBOL qualifying group (Uruguay). The winner of this play-off qualified for the 2010 FIFA World Cup finals. The draw for the order in which the two matches were played was held on 2 June 2009 during the FIFA Congress in Nassau, the Bahamas.

Team 1	Agg.	Team 2	1st leg	2nd leg
Costa Rica	1–2	Uruguay	0–1	1–1

== Qualified teams ==
The following five teams from CONMEBOL qualified for the final tournament.

Team	Qualified as	Qualified on	Previous appearances in FIFA World Cup^{1}
Brazil	Winners	5 September 2009	18 (all) (1930, 1934, 1938, 1950, 1954, **1958**, **1962**, 1966, **1970**, 1974, 1978, 1982, 1986, 1990, **1994**, 1998, **2002**, 2006)
Chile	Runners-up	10 October 2009	7 (1930, 1950, 1962, 1966, 1974, 1982, 1998)
Paraguay	Third place	9 September 2009	7 (1930, 1950, 1958, 1986, 1998, 2002, 2006)
Argentina	Fourth place	14 October 2009	14 (1930, 1934, 1958, 1962, 1966, 1974, **1978**, 1982, **1986**, 1990, 1994, 1998, 2002, 2006)
Uruguay	CONCACAF v CONMEBOL play-off winners	18 November 2009	10 (**1930**, **1950**, 1954, 1962, 1966, 1970, 1974, 1986, 1990, 2002)

^{1} Bold indicates champions for that year. Italic indicates hosts for that year.

== Goalscorers ==
There were 232 goals scored in 90 matches, for an average of 2.58 goals per match.

10 goals

- (Chile) Humberto Suazo

9 goals

- (Brazil) Luís Fabiano

8 goals

- (Bolivia) Joaquín Botero

7 goals

- (Bolivia) Marcelo Moreno
- (Uruguay) Diego Forlán

6 goals

- (Paraguay) Salvador Cabañas
- (Venezuela) Giancarlo Maldonado

5 goals

- (Brazil) Kaká
- (Brazil) Nilmar
- (Paraguay) Nelson Valdez
- (Uruguay) Sebastián Abreu
- (Uruguay) Luis Suárez

4 goals

- (Argentina) Sergio Agüero
- (Argentina) Lionel Messi
- (Argentina) Juan Román Riquelme
- (Brazil) Robinho
- (Chile) Matías Fernández
- (Ecuador) Édison Méndez
- (Uruguay) Carlos Bueno

3 goals

- (Chile) Alexis Sánchez
- (Colombia) Jackson Martínez
- (Ecuador) Walter Ayoví
- (Ecuador) Christian Benítez
- (Paraguay) Cristian Riveros
- (Paraguay) Roque Santa Cruz
- (Peru) Johan Fano
- (Uruguay) Diego Lugano
- (Venezuela) Juan Arango
- (Venezuela) Miku
- (Venezuela) José Manuel Rey

2 goals

- (Bolivia) Ronald García
- (Brazil) Júlio Baptista
- (Chile) Gonzalo Jara
- (Chile) Gary Medel
- (Chile) Fabián Orellana
- (Chile) Marcelo Salas
- (Colombia) Rubén Darío Bustos
- (Colombia) Hugo Rodallega
- (Ecuador) Iván Kaviedes
- (Ecuador) Christian Noboa
- (Ecuador) Antonio Valencia
- (Paraguay) Óscar Cardozo
- (Paraguay) Paulo da Silva
- (Peru) Hernán Rengifo
- (Peru) Juan Manuel Vargas
- (Uruguay) Sebastián Eguren
- (Venezuela) Daniel Arismendi
- (Venezuela) Ronald Vargas

1 goal

- (Argentina) Mario Bolatti
- (Argentina) Esteban Cambiasso
- (Argentina) Jesús Dátolo
- (Argentina) Cata Díaz
- (Argentina) Lucho González
- (Argentina) Gonzalo Higuaín
- (Argentina) Gabriel Milito
- (Argentina) Rodrigo Palacio
- (Argentina) Martín Palermo
- (Argentina) Maxi Rodríguez
- (Argentina) Carlos Tevez
- (Bolivia) Juan Carlos Arce
- (Bolivia) Álex da Rosa
- (Bolivia) Edgar Rolando Olivares
- (Bolivia) Didi Torrico
- (Bolivia) Gerardo Yecerotte
- (Brazil) Adriano
- (Brazil) Dani Alves
- (Brazil) Elano
- (Brazil) Felipe Melo
- (Brazil) Juan
- (Brazil) Luisão
- (Brazil) Ronaldinho
- (Brazil) Vágner Love
- (Chile) Jean Beausejour
- (Chile) Marco Estrada
- (Chile) Ismael Fuentes
- (Chile) Rodrigo Millar
- (Chile) Waldo Ponce
- (Chile) Jorge Valdivia
- (Chile) Arturo Vidal
- (Colombia) Radamel Falcao
- (Colombia) Teófilo Gutiérrez
- (Colombia) Dayro Moreno
- (Colombia) Giovanni Moreno
- (Colombia) Adrián Ramos
- (Colombia) Wason Rentería
- (Colombia) Macnelly Torres
- (Ecuador) Felipe Caicedo
- (Ecuador) Isaac Mina
- (Ecuador) Jefferson Montero
- (Ecuador) Pablo Palacios
- (Ecuador) Carlos Tenorio
- (Ecuador) Patricio Urrutia
- (Paraguay) Néstor Ayala
- (Paraguay) Édgar Benítez
- (Peru) Piero Alva
- (Peru) Juan Carlos Mariño
- (Peru) Andrés Mendoza
- (Uruguay) Vicente Sánchez
- (Uruguay) Andrés Scotti
- (Venezuela) Alejandro Guerra
- (Venezuela) Alejandro Moreno
- (Venezuela) Alexander Rondón

1 own goal

- (Argentina) Gabriel Heinze (against Paraguay)
- (Bolivia) Ronald Rivero (against Venezuela)
- (Venezuela) Juan Fuenmayor (against Peru)

Source: FIFA.com: Scorer stats

== Notes ==
This was the first time that Argentina lost more than 2 or 4 matches and has not finished as leader (1st) or runner-up (2nd) of their qualifying group, during a FIFA World Cup qualification.
