= 2010 FIFA World Cup qualification (CONCACAF–CONMEBOL play-off) =

- Event: 2010 FIFA World Cup qualification
Costa Rica	Uruguay
(Costa Rica)	(Uruguay)
1	2
- on aggregate

First leg
Costa Rica	Uruguay
0	1
- Date: 14 November 2009
- Venue: Estadio Ricardo Saprissa Aymá, San José
- Referee: Alberto Undiano Mallenco (Spain)
- Attendance: 19,500
- Weather: Calm; 21 °C (70 °F)

Second leg
Uruguay	Costa Rica
1	1
- Date: 18 November 2009
- Venue: Estadio Centenario, Montevideo
- Referee: Massimo Busacca (Switzerland)
- Attendance: 62,150
- Weather: Party cloudy 20 °C (68 °F)

The 2010 FIFA World Cup CONCACAF–CONMEBOL qualification play-off were a series of two-legged home-and-away ties between the fourth-placed team of the CONCACAF qualifying tournament, Costa Rica, and the fifth-placed team from the South American qualifying tournament, Uruguay.

The games were played on 14 and 18 November 2009. In the first leg, held in San José, Uruguay beat Costa Rica 1–0, while in the second leg played at Estadio Centenario in Montevideo, both teams tied 1–1. Uruguay won the series 2–1 on aggregate and qualified for the 2010 World Cup.

== Overview ==
It was the third consecutive FIFA World Cup play-off that Uruguay has participated in after 3–1 on aggregate win over Australia for Korea/Japan 2002 and losing to Australia 4–2 on penalties for Germany 2006.

The draw for the order in which the two matches would be played was held on 2 June 2009 during the FIFA Congress in Nassau, The Bahamas.

== Venues ==
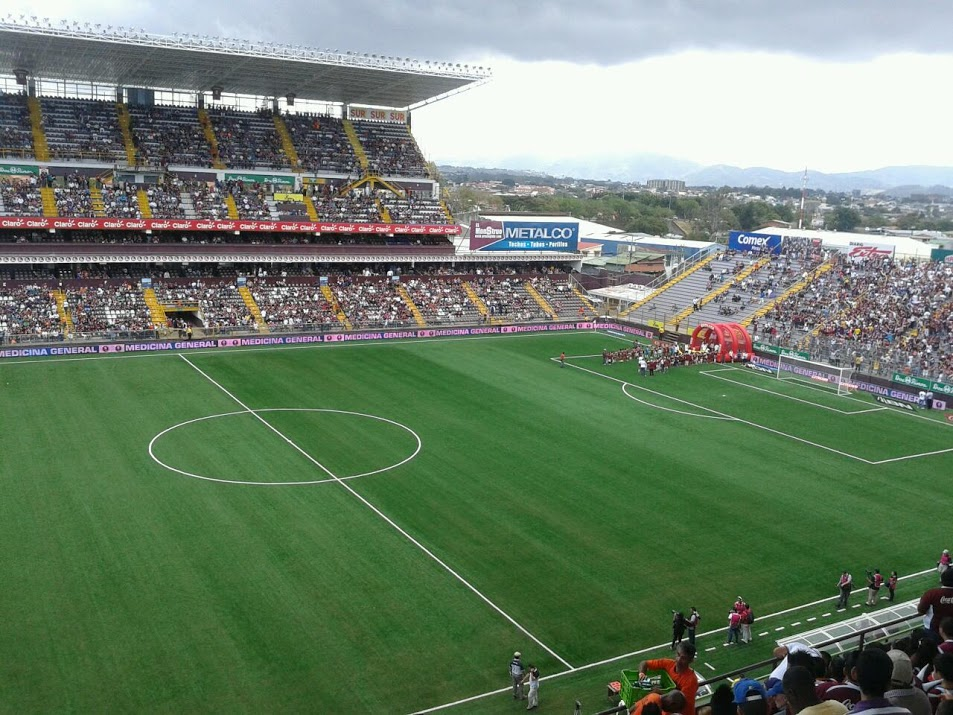
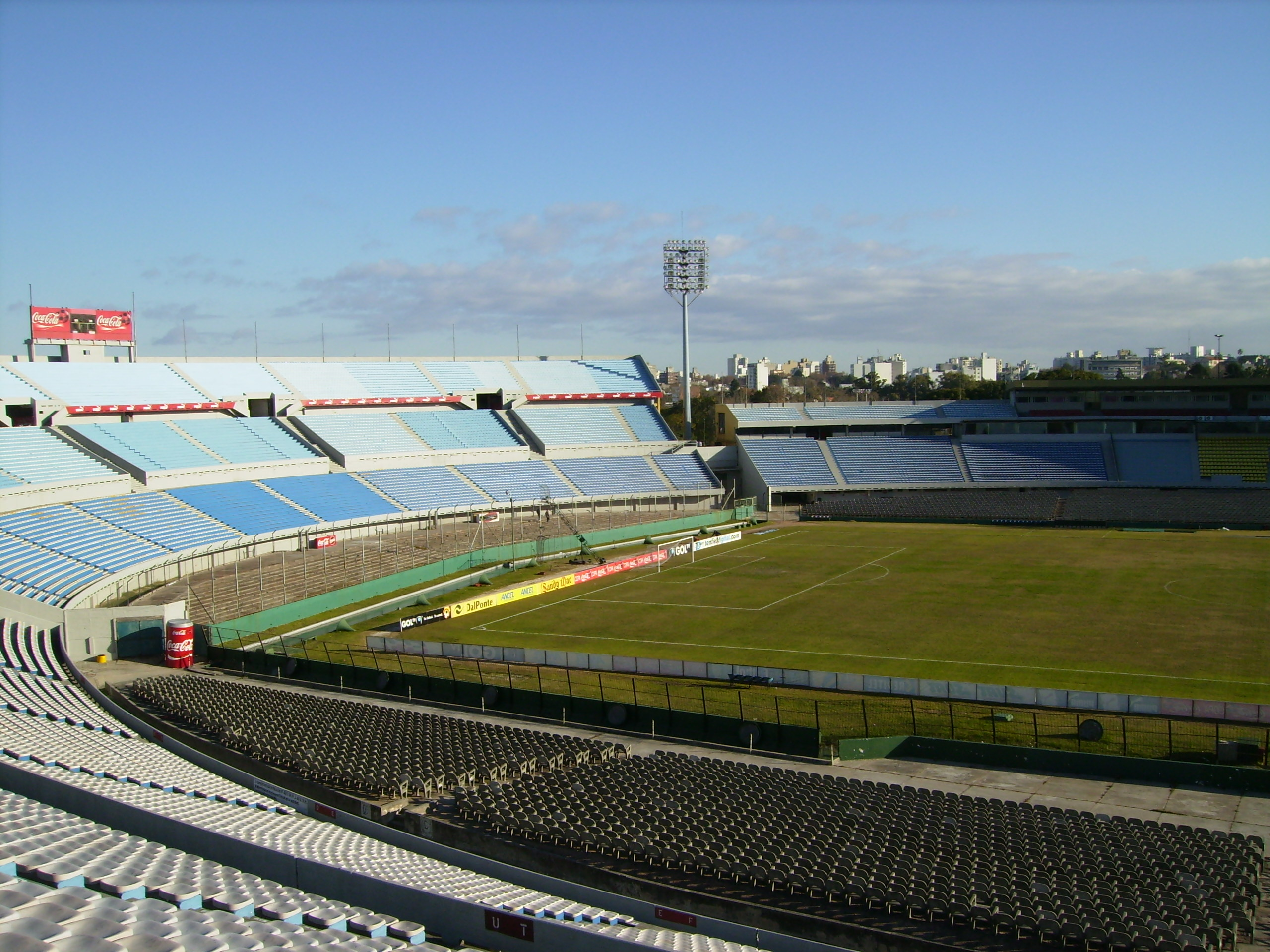
Estadio Ricardo Saprissa (left) and Estadio Centenario, venues for the series

== Match details ==
=== First leg ===
2010 FIFA World Cup qualification playoff
14 November 2009
20:15 UTC–6
First leg

Costa Rica	0–1	Uruguay
	Report	Lugano 21'

Estadio Ricardo Saprissa Aymá, San José
Attendance: 19,500
Referee: Alberto Undiano Mallenco (Spain)

Costa Rica

Uruguay

GK	1	Keylor Navas
DF	18	Gilberto Martínez		(substituted off) 24'
DF	2	Esteban Sirias
DF	3	Luis Marín		(substituted off) 63'
MF	13	Roy Miller		(substituted off) 77'
MF	8	Randall Azofeifa	(yellow card) 30' (yellow-red card) 53'
MF	14	Christian Bolaños
MF	5	Celso Borges
MF	10	Walter Centeno	(yellow card) 90+3'
FW	11	Bryan Ruiz
FW	9	Álvaro Saborío
Substitutes:
DF	4	Michael Umaña		(substituted on) 24'
FW	7	Rolando Fonseca		(substituted on) 63'
MF	15	Júnior Díaz		(substituted on) 77'
Manager:
(Brazil) René Simões

GK	1	Fernando Muslera
DF	2	Diego Lugano
DF	4	Mauricio Victorino	(yellow card) 34'
DF	3	Diego Godín	(yellow card) 55'
DF	11	Álvaro Pereira
MF	8	Sebastián Eguren
MF	7	Álvaro Fernández	(yellow card) 42'
MF	20	Álvaro González
MF	14	Nicolás Lodeiro		(substituted off) 61'
FW	10	Diego Forlán
FW	9	Luis Suárez	(yellow card) 79'	(substituted off) 80'
Substitutes:
MF	17	Jorge Rodríguez		(substituted on) 61'
FW	19	Sebastián Fernández		(substituted on) 80'
Manager:
(Uruguay) Óscar Tabárez

=== Second leg ===
18 November 2009
21:00 UTC–2
Second leg

Uruguay	1–1	Costa Rica
Abreu 70'	Report	Centeno 74'

Estadio Centenario, Montevideo
Attendance: 62,150
Referee: Massimo Busacca (Switzerland)

Uruguay

Costa Rica

GK	1	Fernando Muslera
DF	6	Andrés Scotti		(substituted off) 71'
DF	2	Diego Lugano
DF	3	Diego Godín
MF	16	Maxi Pereira
MF	15	Diego Pérez	(yellow card) 30'
MF	8	Sebastián Eguren
MF	11	Álvaro Pereira
MF	14	Nicolás Lodeiro		(substituted off) 83'
FW	10	Diego Forlán
FW	9	Luis Suárez		(substituted off) 64'
Substitutes:
FW	13	Sebastián Abreu		(substituted on) 64'
DF	4	Mauricio Victorino		(substituted on) 71'
MF	7	Álvaro Fernández		(substituted on) 83'
Manager:
(Uruguay) Óscar Tabárez

GK	1	Keylor Navas
DF	4	Michael Umaña
DF	3	Luis Marín		(substituted off) 68'
DF	13	Roy Miller	(yellow card) 16'
DF	17	Pablo Herrera
MF	5	Celso Borges		(substituted off) 57'
MF	10	Walter Centeno
MF	15	Júnior Díaz
FW	14	Christian Bolaños	(yellow card) 14'
FW	11	Bryan Ruiz
FW	16	Víctor Núñez		(substituted off) 63'
Substitutes:
MF	6	Michael Barrantes		(substituted on) 57'
FW	7	Rolando Fonseca		(substituted on) 63'
FW	9	Álvaro Saborío		(substituted on) 68'
Manager:
(Brazil) René Simões

== Broadcasting rights ==
=== Americas ===
- Brazil: SporTV
