= Didí Torrico =

Bolivian footballer (born 1988)

Personal information
- Full name: Didí Torrico Camacho
- Date of birth: 18 May 1988 (age 38)
- Place of birth: Cochabamba, Bolivia
- Height: 1.80 m (5 ft 11 in)
- Position: Midfielder

Team information
- Current team: Aurora
- Number: 26

Senior career*
Years	Team	Apps	(Gls)
2005	Iberoamericana	5	(0)
2006–2008	La Paz	107	(5)
2009	Wilstermann	27	(0)
2010	Bolívar	37	(1)
2011–2012	Nacional Potosi	31	(1)
2012–2013	San José	43	(3)
2013–2014	Guabirá	41	(3)
2014–2016	Blooming	75	(4)
2016–2017	San José	41	(3)
2017	Sport Boys Warnes	18	(0)
2018–2019	San José	92	(5)
2020	Wilstermann	24	(0)
2021	Royal Pari	25	(0)
2022	Club Atlético Palmaflor	42	(0)
2023–	Aurora	79	(3)

International career
2007	Bolivia U-20	4	(0)
2008–2009	Bolivia	9	(2)
- * Club domestic league appearances and goals as of 30 December 2025

Didí Torrico Camacho (born 18 May 1988 in Cochabamba) is a Bolivian football midfielder who currently plays for Aurora and the Bolivia national team.

== Career ==
Torrico began his career in 2005 playing for Iberoamericana before transferring to La Paz F.C. the following year. After three seasons in La Paz, he joined Wilstermann in early 2009. That year he played a significant role in helping the club avoid relegation. His good form rewarded him with a transfer to the country's most successful club, Bolívar in 2010.

He also has earned nine caps for the Bolivia national team since 2008, and scored his first international goal against Mexico on March 11, 2009.

== International goals ==
Didí Torrico: International Goals
#	Date	Venue	Opponent	Score	Result	Competition
1.	March 11, 2009	Dick's Sporting Goods Park, Commerce City, United States	Mexico	1–3	1–5	Friendly
2.	April 1, 2009	Estadio Hernando Siles, La Paz, Bolivia	Argentina	6–1	6–1	2010 World Cup qualification
