= Héctor Baldassi =

Argentine football referee and politician (born 1966)

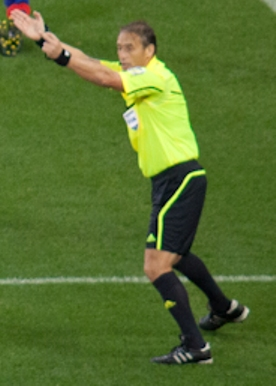
- Baldassi on the field.
- Full name: Héctor Walter Baldassi
- Born: 5 January 1966 (age 60); Río Ceballos, Córdoba, Argentina
- Other occupation: Politician

Domestic
Years	League	Role
1998–2013	Argentine Primera División	Referee

International
Years	League	Role
2000–2013	CONMEBOL	Referee
2007–2013	FIFA	Referee

Héctor Walter Baldassi (born 5 January 1966) is an Argentine retired football referee and politician. His first Argentine first division was in 1998 and only two years later he debuted internationally. Nicknamed La Coneja (Spanish for "the she-rabbit"), Baldassi officiated several CONMEBOL club competitions including the final match of the 2008 Copa Libertadores (with a critical performance that had a direct impact on the final result of the match), and participated in several international competitions including the 2004 Copa América and the 2008 Olympic Games in Beijing. He was called for the 2007 FIFA U-20 World Cup but was later dismissed because one of his assistants didn't pass the medical tests.

Despite his errors against Brazilian soccer teams in 2008 Libertadores da América, he was preselected as a referee for the 2010 FIFA World Cup, officiating his first World Cup match in Ghana's 1–0 win over Serbia on 13 June 2010. Then, he officiated Netherlands 1-0 win over Japan.

In 2013, he was elected to be a member of the Argentine Chamber of Deputies, representing his home province of Córdoba for the Republican Proposal (PRO) party. He was re-elected in 2017.
