= Johan Fano =

Peruvian footballer (born 1978)

Personal information
- Full name: Johan Javier Fano Espinoza
- Date of birth: 9 August 1978 (age 48)
- Place of birth: Huánuco, Peru
- Height: 1.78 m (5 ft 10 in)
- Position: Forward

Senior career*
| Years | Team | Apps | (Gls) |
| 1995–2002 | León de Huánuco | 18 | (3) |
| 1996–1997 | → Unión Minas (loan) | 13 | (1) |
| 1998 | → Alcides Vigo (loan) | 10 | (4) |
| 1999 | → Deportivo Pesquero (loan) | 20 | (7) |
| 2000 | → Sport Boys (loan) | 33 | (7) |
| 2001 | → Unión Minas (loan) | 16 | (9) |
| 2001 | → Sport Boys (loan) | 16 | (8) |
| 2002–2007 | Alianza Lima | 49 | (8) |
| 2003–2004 | → Coronel Bolognesi (loan) | 65 | (39) |
| 2006 | → Coronel Bolognesi (loan) | 14 | (6) |
| 2007–2012 | Universitario de Deportes | 72 | (31) |
| 2008–2009 | → Once Caldas (loan) | 66 | (35) |
| 2010 | → Atlante (loan) | 31 | (19) |
| 2012 | → Atlético Nacional (loan) | 12 | (0) |
| 2012 | Itagüí | 17 | (6) |
| 2013–2014 | León de Huánuco | 49 | (19) |
| 2014–2015 | Águilas Doradas | 52 | (13) |
| 2016 | UTC | 35 | (13) |
| 2017 | Sport Boys | 22 | (9) |
| Total | | 610 | (237) |

International career
| 2003–2011 | Peru | 17 | (3) |

Managerial career
- 2018–: Águilas Doradas (assistant)
- 2021: Águilas Doradas (interim)
- * Club domestic league appearances and goals

Johan Javier Fano Espinoza (born 9 August 1978) is a Peruvian football manager and former player who played as a forward.

== Career ==
His professional football debut was on 5 March 1995, playing for León de Huánuco. Fano has played for many Peruvian football clubs throughout his career. He has played for both Universitario and Alianza Lima, and notably scored 46 goals for Coronel Bolognesi. He has also been called to play for the Peru national football team for both friendlies and official matches (World Cup Qualifiers). He was the top-scorer for the 2007 season and signed with Once Caldas the following season and scored on his debut in the Colombian league.

In 2009, he scored 13 goals in 24 matches for Once Caldas. In December 2009 the Mexican team Atlante F.C. have signed the Peruvian forward from Colombian club Once Caldas on a one-year deal.

== International career ==
Fano has made nine appearances for the Peru national football team.

== Career statistics ==
=== International ===
Appearances and goals by national team and year
| National team | Year | Apps | Goals |
|---|---|---|---|
| Peru | 2003 | 1 | 0 |
| Peru | 2007 | 1 | 0 |
| Peru | 2008 | 4 | 1 |
| Peru | 2009 | 9 | 2 |
| Peru | 2010 | 1 | 0 |
| Peru | 2011 | 1 | 0 |
| Total | | 17 | 3 |

Scores and results list Peru's goal tally first, score column indicates score after each Fano goal.

List of international goals scored by Johan Fano
| No. | Date | Venue | Opponent | Score | Result | Competition | Ref. |
|---|---|---|---|---|---|---|---|
| 1 | 10 September 2008 | Estadio Monumental, Lima, Peru | Argentina | 1–1 | 1–1 | 2010 FIFA World Cup qualification | |
| 2 | 29 March 2009 | Estadio Monumental, Lima, Peru | Chile | 1–2 | 1–3 | 2010 FIFA World Cup qualification | |
| 3 | 14 October 2009 | Alejandro Villanueva Stadium, Lima, Peru | Bolivia | 1–0 | 1–0 | 2010 FIFA World Cup qualification | |
