= Pablo Palacios =

Ecuadorian footballer (born 1982)

Personal information
- Full name: Pablo David Palacios Herreria
- Date of birth: February 5, 1982 (age 44)
- Place of birth: Quito, Ecuador
- Height: 1.78 m (5 ft 10 in)
- Position: Striker

Youth career
- 1999–2002: LDU Quito

Senior career*
Years	Team	Apps	(Gls)
2001	Otavalo	7	(?)
2002	LDU Quito	0	(0)
2003	América de Quito	10	(?)
2004–2006	Aucas	81	(23)
2007	Deportivo Quito	42	(15)
2008–2011	Barcelona	100	(30)
2012	Emelec	3	(0)
2013–2015	El Nacional	0	(0)
2016–2017	Guayaquil		
2017	Imbabura	?	(1)

International career
2007–2011	Ecuador	15	(2)
- * Club domestic league appearances and goals as of 6 April 2017 (UTC)

Pablo David Palacios Herreria (born February 5, 1982, in Quito) is a former Ecuadorian football striker. He is known as one of the best strikers in the domestic tournament and has solidified his reputation as a goalscorer amongst Ecuador's top clubs.

== Club career ==
Palacios started out as a LDU Quito youth product, but got very little playing time. After spending some seasons in third division clubs América de Quito and Otavalo, he moved to Liga's rivals Aucas in 2004. By 2006, he had scored 23 goals in 81 matches, earning him a transfer to one of Ecuador's big teams, Deportivo Quito. His talent and goalscoring prowess earned him a call-up to the national team from Colombian coach Luis Fernando Suárez.

=== Barcelona Sporting Club ===
In December 2007, Palacios moved to Ecuador's most popular team, Guayaquil side Barcelona. In his first season at the club, he netted 20 goals, finishing the season as the league's top scorer. However, 2009 proved to be a regrettable season for both himself and the club. Barcelona barely escaped relegation and Palacios was tied as Barca's top-scorer for the season with only 6 goals. Despite the uncertainty whether Palacios would remain in Barcelona for the 2010 season, on January 4, 2010, he signed a one-year contract with the club he has confessed of being a fan of, Barcelona.

=== Emelec ===
In January 2012, Palacios was signed on a free by Barcelona's archrival Emelec.

== International career ==
Palacios began playing for Ecuador in 2007, making some important appearances against squads like Sweden, Ireland, and Colombia.

He was part of the squad that participated in the 2007 Copa América. However, he was not featured in any matches and watched Ecuador's early elimination on the bench. He did not get another callup until August 2008 when national team manager Sixto Vizuete called him up for a friendly against Colombia. He was called again to play with Bolivia and Uruguay in September 2008 for the 2010 FIFA World Cup Qualification matches. He came off the bench against Bolivia making his official debut in this tournament. On June 10, 2009, Palacios scored the second goal in a 2–0 win over Argentina.

=== International goals ===
#	Date	Venue	Opponent	Score	Result	Competition
1	June 10, 2009	Estadio Olímpico Atahualpa, Quito	Argentina	2–0	2–0	2010 FIFA World Cup qualification
2	February 9, 2011	Estadio Nilmo Edwards, La Ceiba	Honduras	1–1	1–1	International friendly
