= Juan Fuenmayor =

Venezuelan footballer (born 1979)

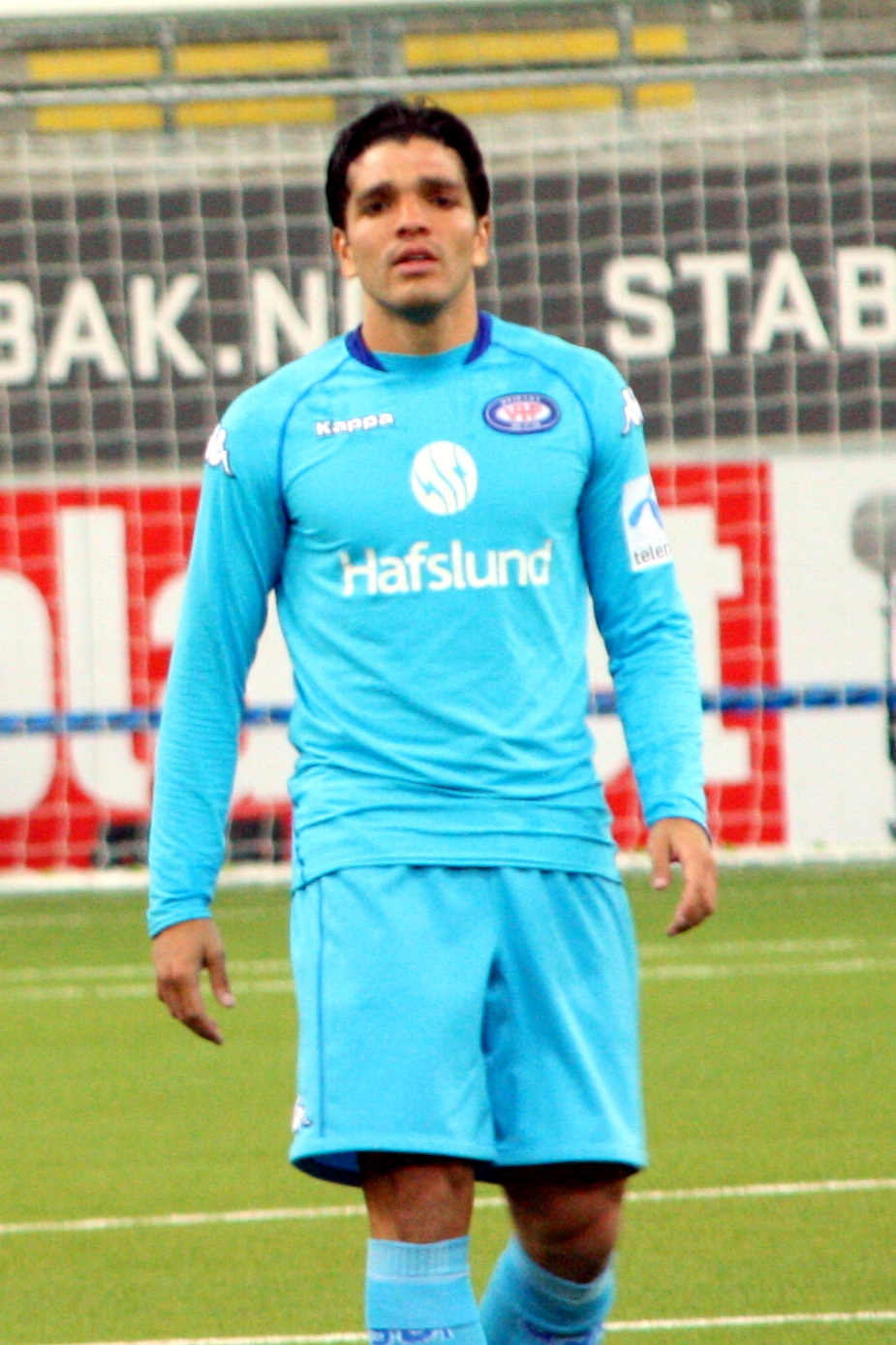

Personal information
- Full name: Juan José Fuenmayor Núñez
- Date of birth: 5 September 1979 (age 47)
- Place of birth: Maracaibo, Venezuela
- Height: 1.76 m (5 ft 9 in)
- Position: Left full back

Youth career
- 2000–2002: Unión Atlético Maracaibo

Senior career*
Years	Team	Apps	(Gls)
2002–2008	UA Maracaibo	22	(0)
2008–2009	Zulia	19	(1)
2009–2010	Vålerenga	9	(0)
2010–2016	Deportivo Anzoátegui	174	(5)
2017–2019	Miami United	?	(?)

International career^{‡}
2005–2010	Venezuela	26	(0)
- * Club domestic league appearances and goals as of 11 November 2009 ‡ National team caps and goals as of 5 February 2014

Juan José Fuenmayor Núñez (born 5 September 1979) is a retired Venezuelan professional footballer. He played as a left-back or central defender.

== Club career ==
Fuenmayor started his playing career with Unión Atlético Maracaibo where he was part of the squad that won Primera División Venezolana in 2005. After financial troubles hit, he joined Maracaibo based Zulia FC before a brief spell in Europe with Vålerenga. He returned to Venezuela, signing for Deportivo Anzoátegui in 2010.

== International career ==
He made his debut for Venezuela in 2005 and made 25 appearances, scoring no goals.
