= Joaquín Botero =

Bolivian footballer (born 1977)

Personal information
- Full name: Joaquín Botero Vaca
- Date of birth: 10 December 1977 (age 48)
- Place of birth: La Paz, Bolivia
- Height: 1.71 m (5 ft 7 in)
- Position: Striker

Senior career*
| Years | Team | Apps | (Gls) |
| 1997 | Mariscal Braun | 22 | (18) |
| 1998 | Deportivo Municipal | 24 | (18) |
| 1999–2003 | Bolívar | 132 | (111) |
| 2003–2006 | UNAM | 81 | (21) |
| 2006 | San Lorenzo de Almagro | 2 | (0) |
| 2007 | Deportivo Táchira | 5 | (0) |
| 2008 | Bolívar | 25 | (11) |
| 2009–2010 | Correcaminos UAT | 28 | (10) |
| 2010 | → Al Arabi (loan) | 4 | (3) |
| 2011 | San José | 16 | (8) |
| 2013–2014 | Sport Boys | 20 | (5) |
| Total | | 350 | (198) |

International career
| 1999–2009 | Bolivia | 48 | (20) |
- * Club domestic league appearances and goals

Joaquín Botero Vaca (born 10 December 1977) is a Bolivian former professional footballer who played as a striker.

He is the second all-time top goalscorer for the Bolivia national team with 20 goals and was awarded the World's Best Top Division Goal Scorer by the IFFHS for scoring 49 goals in a season Club Bolívar in 2002.

== Club career ==
Botero not only played in Bolivia's football league, he also played abroad, in the football leagues of Mexico, Argentina and Venezuela.

After scoring 133 goals for Club Bolívar and becoming the club's second highest goalscorer of all time behind Luis Fernando Salinas, he left the club to play abroad.

Botero's first foreign club was the Mexican team Pumas. In his first season with Pumas, the 2003 Apertura, he scored three goals in 17 games. After scoring another three in nine games in the 2004 Clausura, Botero broke out in the 2004 Apertura, registering 11 goals in 19 games.

In 2006, he joined San Lorenzo de Almagro of the Primera División de Argentina and in 2007 he played for Deportivo Táchira of Venezuela. After an unsuccessful stint in both clubs, Botero returned to Bolívar as a free agent in 2008.

He joined the Mexican team Correcaminos UAT for the Clausura 2009 season, marking his return to Mexico.

In January 2010, he was loaned out to Al Arabi Kuwait for $170,000. He made four appearances and scored three goals.

In 2011, Botero returned to his country to play for San José and Sport Boys Warnes; in the latter, he was the author of two goals that allowed promotion of the team to the First Division of Bolivia for the first time. In this team, he played until his retirement in 2014.

For six years and after his retirement, Botero decided to dedicate himself to personal activities and projects. However, in 2020 he announced his return to the fields, playing for Club Universidad San Francisco de Asís of the Primera A de Potosí in Tupiza, Bolivia.

== International career ==
Since 1999, Botero was a regular player for the Bolivia national team, including participation in the 1999 FIFA Confederations Cup, in which he played in all three of Bolivia's group stage matches, the 2001 Copa América and the 2004 Copa América.

On 1 April 2009, Botero scored a hat-trick for Bolivia in a historic 6–1 victory over Argentina in a 2010 FIFA World Cup qualifier, Argentina's first loss under the recently appointed manager, Diego Maradona. On 15 May 2009, Botero surprisingly announced the end of his era with the national team, putting as an excuse that his motivation "was not there anymore."

In his ten years playing for Bolivia, Botero earned a total of 48 caps and scored 20 goals, becoming the highest scorer in the national team's history, before being surpassed by Marcelo Moreno in 2020.

Botero represented his country in 30 FIFA World Cup qualification matches, scoring 16 goals.

== Career statistics ==
Appearances and goals by national team and year
| National team | Year | Apps | Goals |
|---|---|---|---|
| Bolivia | 1999 | 3 | 0 |
| Bolivia | 2000 | 6 | 3 |
| Bolivia | 2001 | 7 | 3 |
| Bolivia | 2002 | 2 | 0 |
| Bolivia | 2003 | 4 | 4 |
| Bolivia | 2004 | 10 | 2 |
| Bolivia | 2005 | 5 | 0 |
| Bolivia | 2008 | 9 | 5 |
| Bolivia | 2009 | 2 | 3 |
| Total | | 48 | 20 |

Scores and results list Bolivia's goal tally first, score column indicates score after each Botero goal.

List of international goals scored by Joaquín Botero
| No. | Date | Venue | Opponent | Score | Result | Competition |
|---|---|---|---|---|---|---|
| 1. | 5 March 2000 | Estadio Hernando Siles, La Paz, Bolivia | Haiti | 5-1 | 9–2 | Friendly |
| 2. | 5 March 2000 | Estadio Hernando Siles, La Paz, Bolivia | Haiti | 8-2 | 9–2 | Friendly |
| 3. | 5 March 2000 | Estadio Hernando Siles, La Paz, Bolivia | Haiti | 9-2 | 9–2 | Friendly |
| 4. | 25 April 2001 | Estadio Hernando Siles, La Paz, Bolivia | Argentina | 3–1 | 3–3 | 2002 World Cup qualification |
| 5. | 3 June 2001 | Estadio Hernando Siles, La Paz, Bolivia | Venezuela | 2-0 | 5–0 | 2002 World Cup qualification |
| 6. | 3 June 2001 | Estadio Hernando Siles, La Paz, Bolivia | Venezuela | 4-0 | 5–0 | 2002 World Cup qualification |
| 7. | 10 September 2003 | Estadio Hernando Siles, La Paz, Bolivia | Colombia | 2-0 | 4–0 | 2006 World Cup qualification |
| 8. | 10 September 2003 | Estadio Hernando Siles, La Paz, Bolivia | Colombia | 3-0 | 4–0 | 2006 World Cup qualification |
| 9. | 10 September 2003 | Estadio Hernando Siles, La Paz, Bolivia | Colombia | 4-0 | 4–0 | 2006 World Cup qualification |
| 10. | 18 November 2003 | Estadio José Romero, Maracaibo, Venezuela | Venezuela | 0-1 | 2–1 | 2006 World Cup qualification |
| 11. | 6 July 2004 | Estadio Nacional, Lima, Peru | Peru | 0-1 | 2–2 | 2004 Copa América |
| 12. | 9 October 2004 | Estadio Hernando Siles, La Paz, Bolivia | Peru | 1–0 | 1–0 | 2006 World Cup qualification |
| 13. | 18 June 2008 | Estadio Hernando Siles, La Paz, Bolivia | Paraguay | 1-0 | 4–2 | 2010 World Cup qualification |
| 14. | 18 June 2008 | Estadio Hernando Siles, La Paz, Bolivia | Paraguay | 3-1 | 4–2 | 2010 World Cup qualification |
| 15. | 6 September 2008 | Estadio Olímpico Atahualpa, Quito, Ecuador | Ecuador | 1-1 | 3–1 | 2010 World Cup qualification |
| 16. | 11 October 2008 | Estadio Hernando Siles, La Paz, Bolivia | Peru | 1-0 | 3–0 | 2010 World Cup qualification |
| 17. | 11 October 2008 | Estadio Hernando Siles, La Paz, Bolivia | Peru | 2-0 | 3–0 | 2010 World Cup qualification |
| 18. | 1 April 2009 | Estadio Hernando Siles, La Paz, Bolivia | Argentina | 2-1 | 6–1 | 2010 World Cup qualification |
| 19. | 1 April 2009 | Estadio Hernando Siles, La Paz, Bolivia | Argentina | 4-1 | 6–1 | 2010 World Cup qualification |
| 20. | 1 April 2009 | Estadio Hernando Siles, La Paz, Bolivia | Argentina | 5-1 | 6–1 | 2010 World Cup qualification |

== Honours ==
Bolívar

- Liga de Fútbol Profesional Boliviano: 2002

UNAM

- Primera División de México: 2004 (C), 2004 (A)

Individual

- Liga de Fútbol Profesional Boliviano: 2002 Topscorer (49 goals)
- Liga de Fútbol Profesional Boliviano: World's Best Top Division Goal Scorer of the Year (49 goals)

== See also ==
- Bolivia national football team
