= Carlos Amarilla =

Paraguayan football referee

Carlos Arecio Amarilla Demarqui
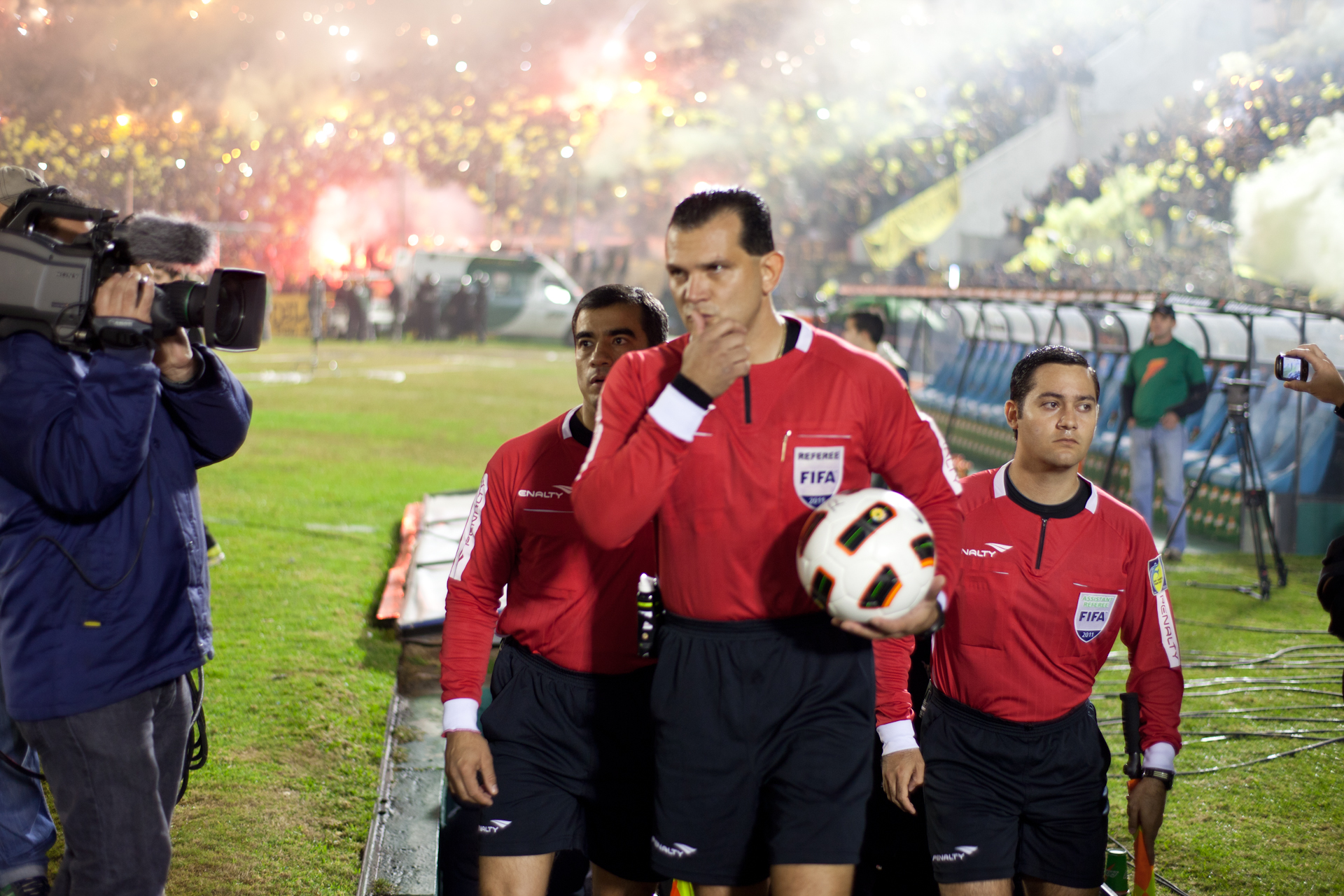
- Full name: Carlos Arecio Amarilla Demarqui
- Born: 26 October 1970 (age 56)
- Other occupation: Electrical Engineer

International
Years	League	Role
2006–2013	FIFA listed	Referee

Carlos Arecio Amarilla Demarqui (born 26 October 1970) is a football referee from Paraguay. Amarilla has been a referee since 1997 and his first international game was between Uruguay and Ecuador. In the 2006 FIFA World Cup he took charge of the opening Group E match between the United States and the Czech Republic, and the Group G match between Switzerland and Togo. Amarilla was not chosen to officiate Knockout Round matches.

He was the referee in the first qualifying match for the 2010 World Cup between Colombia and Brazil (14 October 2007).

He was pre-selected as a referee for the 2010 FIFA World Cup. Amarilla was chosen to officiate at the finals, but withdrew following the failure of a fitness test by his assistant referees.

On 11 September 2012, he officiated a 2014 FIFA World Cup qualifying match between Uruguay and Ecuador.

On 15 May 2013, he also officiated Copa Libertadores 2013's Round of 16 match between Corinthians and Boca Juniors (1-1). The Brazilian team ended up eliminated after the aggregated score.

Besides being a FIFA referee, Amarilla is an electrical engineer by trade.
