= Víctor Hugo Rivera =

Peruvian football referee (born 1967)

Víctor Hugo Rivera Chávez
- Full name: Víctor Hugo Rivera Chávez
- Born: 11 January 1967 (age 59); Peru
- Other occupation: University professor

Domestic
Years	League	Role
1997–present	Peruvian Primera División	Referee

International
Years	League	Role
2001–present	FIFA listed	Referee

Víctor Hugo Rivera Chávez (born January 11, 1967) is a Peruvian football referee. He has been a referee for Peruvian Primera División since 1997 and earned his FIFA badge in 2001. Rivera is a university professor by profession.
