= Carlos Chandía =

Chilean politician

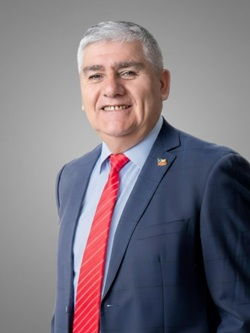

Member of the Chamber of Deputies
- Incumbent
- Assumed office 11 March 2026
- Constituency: 19th District

Mayor of Coihueco
- In office 6 December 2012 – 6 December 2024

Personal details
- Born: 14 November 1964 (age 61) Coihueco, Chile
- Party: National Renewal
- Spouse: Jennifer Ferrada
- Children: Two
- Occupation: Politician; Former FIFA referee

Carlos Luis Chandía Alarcón (born 14 November 1964) is a Chilean politician and former international football referee, elected as deputy in November 2025.

He served as Mayor of Coihueco from 2012 to 2024, following a career as one of Chile's most prominent FIFA-listed referees.

== Professional refereeing career ==
Chandía became a professional referee in 2001 and quickly rose to international prominence. He officiated major matches in the Copa Libertadores, including the finals in 2004, 2008, and 2009, as well as the 2004 Copa Sudamericana final. He also took part in the 2005 Confederations Cup, the 2005 FIFA Club World Cup, and served in support roles during the 2006 FIFA World Cup.

After years of recognition—including being ranked among the top 30 referees worldwide by the IFFHS—he retired from refereeing on 5 December 2009 following the first leg of the Chilean Clausura final between Colo-Colo and Universidad Católica.

In May 2010, ANFP president Harold Mayne-Nicholls appointed him head of the national refereeing commission.

== Political career ==
Chandía was elected Mayor of Coihueco in 2012 and reelected in 2016 and 2021, serving three consecutive terms as the municipality's chief executive.

== Individual honors ==
Distinction	Year
ANFP Golden Ball – Best Male Referee of Chile	2009
