= Carlos Eugênio Simon =

Brazilian ex-FIFA football referee (born 1965)

Carlos Simon
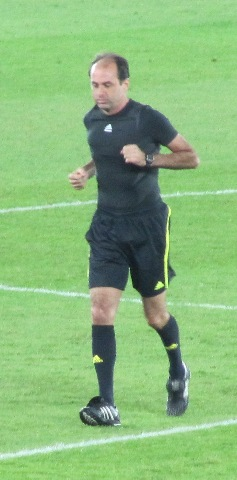
- Simon warming up before a match at the 2009 FIFA Club World Cup in Abu Dhabi.
- Full name: Carlos Eugênio Simon
- Born: 3 September 1965 (age 61); Rio Grande do Sul, Brazil
- Other occupation: Journalist

International
Years	League	Role
1997–	CONMEBOL	Referee
1997– 2010	FIFA	Referee

Carlos Eugênio Simon (born 3 September 1965) is a Brazilian ex-FIFA football referee. He is also a journalist and he works for Fox Sports Brasil since 2012. Simon has been an international referee since 1998 and his first international game was between Ecuador and Peru. He was a referee in the 2002 FIFA World Cup, 2006 FIFA World Cup, and 2010 FIFA World Cup.

During the 2006 FIFA World Cup, Simon officiated at three matches.

He was selected for the 2010 FIFA World Cup and was chosen to officiate the match between England and the United States on 12 June.

== Biography ==
Carlos Simon was born on the small town of Braga, Rio Grande do Sul, on 3 September 1965. He is a first cousin of tennis player Marcos Daniel.

He earned a bachelor's degree in journalism from the Pontifical Catholic University of Rio Grande do Sul. He completed his postgraduate education on sports science, specializing in soccer.

Simon became a referee for the CBF in 1993, and for the FIFA in 1997. He participated in the 2000 Olympic Games, the 2002, 2006 and 2010 FIFA World Cup Qualifying Tournaments, and every Copa Libertadores competition since 2000. He also officiated the finals of the Campeonato Brasileiro four times (1998, 1999, 2001 and 2002), the Brazil Cup three times (2000, 2003 and 2004).

On 2004, he released his first book, titled Na Diagonal do Campo (English: On the Diagonal of the Field). In it, he explains the rules of a football match and the routine of a referee.

Preceded by Márcio Rezende de Freitas	(Brazil) Brazilian FIFA World Cup referee 2002, 2006, 2010	Succeeded by Sandro Ricci
