= 2007 Copa América squads =

Below are the rosters of the teams that participated in the 2007 Copa América. Unlike the World Cup and European Championship, squads were 22-man, with many opting to take only two goalkeepers.

== Group A ==
=== Bolivia ===
Head coach: Erwin Sánchez

No.	Pos.	Player	Date of birth (age)	Caps	Club
1	GK	Hugo Suárez	7 February 1982 (aged 25)		(Bolivia) Jorge Wilstermann
2	DF	Juan Manuel Peña (c)	17 January 1973 (aged 34)		(Spain) Villarreal
3	DF	Limbert Méndez	18 August 1982 (aged 24)		(Bolivia) Jorge Wilstermann
4	DF	Lorgio Álvarez	29 June 1978 (aged 28)		(Paraguay) Cerro Porteño
5	MF	Leonel Reyes	19 November 1976 (aged 30)		(Bolivia) Bolívar
6	MF	Ronald García	17 December 1980 (aged 26)		(Greece) Aris
7	FW	Nelson Sossa	14 March 1986 (aged 21)		(Bolivia) Jorge Wilstermann
8	MF	Gualberto Mojica	7 October 1984 (aged 22)		(Portugal) Paços de Ferreira
9	FW	Jaime Moreno	19 January 1974 (aged 33)		(United States) D.C. United
10	MF	Joselito Vaca	12 August 1982 (aged 24)		(Bolivia) Blooming
11	FW	Diego Cabrera	13 August 1982 (aged 24)		(Bolivia) Aurora
12	GK	Sergio Galarza	25 August 1975 (aged 31)		(Bolivia) Oriente Petrolero
13	DF	Edemir Rodríguez	21 October 1984 (aged 22)		(Bolivia) Real Potosí
14	DF	Miguel Ángel Hoyos	11 March 1981 (aged 26)		(Bolivia) The Strongest
15	DF	Jorge Ortiz	1 June 1984 (aged 23)		(Bolivia) Blooming
16	DF	Ronald Raldes	20 April 1981 (aged 26)		(Argentina) Rosario Central
17	FW	Juan Carlos Arce	10 April 1985 (aged 22)		(Brazil) Corinthians
18	MF	Gonzalo Galindo	20 October 1974 (aged 32)		(Bolivia) The Strongest
19	FW	Augusto Andaveris	5 May 1979 (aged 28)		(Bolivia) La Paz
20	MF	Sacha Lima	17 August 1981 (aged 25)		(Bolivia) Jorge Wilstermann
21	MF	Jhasmani Campos	10 May 1988 (aged 19)		(Bolivia) Oriente Petrolero
22	MF	Darwin Peña	8 August 1977 (aged 29)		(Bolivia) Real Potosí

=== Peru ===
Head coach: Julio César Uribe

No.	Pos.	Player	Date of birth (age)	Caps	Goals	Club
1	GK	Leao Butrón	6 March 1977 (aged 30)			(Peruvian Football Federation) Universidad San Martín
2	DF	Miguel Villalta	16 June 1981 (aged 26)			(Peruvian Football Federation) Sporting Cristal
3	DF	Santiago Acasiete	22 November 1977 (aged 29)			(Royal Spanish Football Federation) Almería
4	DF	Walter Vílchez	20 February 1983 (aged 24)			(Mexican Football Federation) Cruz Azul
5	DF	Alberto Rodríguez	31 March 1984 (aged 23)			(Portuguese Football Federation) Braga
6	DF	Jhoel Herrera	9 July 1980 (aged 26)			(Peruvian Football Federation) Alianza Lima
7	MF	Jair Céspedes	22 May 1984 (aged 23)			(Peruvian Football Federation) Sport Boys
8	MF	Juan Carlos Bazalar	23 February 1968 (aged 39)			(Peruvian Football Federation) Cienciano
9	FW	Paolo Guerrero	1 January 1984 (aged 23)			(German Football Association) Hamburger SV
10	MF	Juan Carlos Mariño	2 January 1982 (aged 25)			(Peruvian Football Federation) Cienciano
11	FW	Ysrael Zúñiga	27 August 1976 (aged 30)			(Peruvian Football Federation) Melgar
12	GK	George Forsyth	20 June 1982 (aged 25)			(Peruvian Football Federation) Alianza Lima
13	DF	Paolo de la Haza	30 November 1983 (aged 23)			(Peruvian Football Federation) Cienciano
14	FW	Claudio Pizarro (c)	3 October 1978 (aged 28)			(German Football Association) Bayern Munich
15	MF	Edgar Villamarín	1 April 1983 (aged 24)			(Peruvian Football Federation) Cienciano
16	FW	Andrés Mendoza	26 April 1978 (aged 29)			(Ukrainian Association of Football) Metalurh Donetsk
17	FW	Jefferson Farfán	20 October 1984 (aged 22)			(Royal Dutch Football Association) PSV
18	MF	Pedro García	14 March 1974 (aged 33)			(Peruvian Football Federation) Universidad San Martín
19	MF	Damián Ísmodes	10 March 1989 (aged 18)			(Peruvian Football Federation) Sporting Cristal
20	FW	Roberto Jiménez	26 April 1983 (aged 24)			(Argentine Football Association) San Lorenzo
21	GK	Juan Flores	25 February 1976 (aged 31)			(Peruvian Football Federation) Cienciano
22	DF	John Galliquio	1 December 1979 (aged 27)			(Peruvian Football Federation) Universitario

=== Uruguay ===
Head coach: Óscar Tabárez

No.	Pos.	Player	Date of birth (age)	Caps	Club
1	GK	Fabián Carini	26 December 1979 (aged 27)	58	(Italy) Inter Milan
2	DF	Diego Lugano (c)	2 November 1980 (aged 26)	13	(Turkey) Fenerbahçe
3	DF	Diego Godín	2 April 1986 (aged 21)	11	(Uruguay) Nacional
4	DF	Jorge Fucile	19 December 1984 (aged 22)		(Portugal) Porto
5	MF	Pablo García	11 May 1977 (aged 30)	57	(Spain) Celta Vigo
6	DF	Darío Rodríguez	17 September 1974 (aged 32)	45	(Germany) Schalke 04
7	MF	Cristian Rodríguez	30 September 1985 (aged 21)		(France) Paris Saint-Germain
8	MF	Walter Gargano	27 July 1984 (aged 22)		(Uruguay) Danubio
9	FW	Gonzalo Vargas	22 September 1981 (aged 25)		(France) Monaco
10	FW	Álvaro Recoba	17 March 1976 (aged 31)		(Italy) Inter Milan
11	FW	Fabián Estoyanoff	27 September 1982 (aged 24)	29	(Spain) Deportivo La Coruña
12	GK	Juan Castillo	17 April 1978 (aged 29)		(Uruguay) Peñarol
13	FW	Sebastián Abreu	17 October 1976 (aged 30)	28	(Mexico) San Luis
14	MF	Carlos Diogo	18 July 1983 (aged 23)		(Spain) Real Zaragoza
15	MF	Diego Pérez	18 May 1980 (aged 27)		(France) Monaco
16	DF	Maxi Pereira	8 June 1984 (aged 23)		(Uruguay) Defensor Sporting
17	DF	Carlos Valdez	2 May 1983 (aged 24)		(Italy) Treviso
18	MF	Fabián Canobbio	8 March 1980 (aged 27)	7	(Spain) Celta Vigo
19	DF	Andrés Scotti	14 December 1975 (aged 31)		(Argentina) Argentinos Juniors
20	MF	Nacho González	14 May 1982 (aged 25)		(Uruguay) Danubio
21	FW	Diego Forlán	19 May 1979 (aged 28)	36	(Spain) Villarreal
22	FW	Vicente Sánchez	7 December 1979 (aged 27)	18	(Mexico) Toluca

=== Venezuela ===
Head coach: Richard Páez

No.	Pos.	Player	Date of birth (age)	Caps	Goals	Club
1	GK	Renny Vega	4 July 1979 (aged 27)	20	0	(Venezuelan Football Federation) Carabobo
2	DF	Luis Vallenilla	13 March 1974 (aged 33)	70	1	(Venezuelan Football Federation) Maracaibo
3	DF	José Manuel Rey	20 May 1975 (aged 32)	81	6	(Venezuelan Football Federation) Caracas
4	DF	Oswaldo Vizcarrondo	31 May 1984 (aged 23)	11	0	(Venezuelan Football Federation) Caracas
5	MF	Miguel Mea Vitali	19 February 1981 (aged 26)	58	1	(Venezuelan Football Federation) Maracaibo
6	DF	Alejandro Cichero	24 April 1977 (aged 30)	40	1	(Bulgarian Football Union) Litex Lovech
7	FW	José Torrealba	13 June 1980 (aged 27)	12	3	(South African Football Association) Mamelodi Sundowns
8	MF	Luis Vera (c)	9 March 1973 (aged 34)	45	2	(Venezuelan Football Federation) Caracas
9	FW	Giancarlo Maldonado	29 June 1982 (aged 24)	20	6	(Football Federation of Chile) O'Higgins
10	MF	César González	1 October 1982 (aged 24)	10	1	(Venezuelan Football Federation) Caracas
11	MF	Ricardo Páez	9 February 1979 (aged 28)	54	6	(Venezuelan Football Federation) Mineros
12	GK	Javier Toyo	12 October 1977 (aged 29)	7	0	(Venezuelan Football Federation) Caracas
13	DF	Leonel Vielma	30 August 1978 (aged 28)	42	2	(Venezuelan Football Federation) Caracas
14	MF	Alejandro Guerra	9 July 1985 (aged 21)	12	1	(Venezuelan Football Federation) Caracas
15	FW	Fernando de Ornelas	29 July 1976 (aged 30)	22	5	(Norwegian Football Federation) Odd Grenland
16	MF	Edder Pérez	3 July 1983 (aged 23)			(Venezuelan Football Federation) Caracas
17	DF	Jorge Rojas	1 October 1977 (aged 29)	57	1	(Venezuelan Football Federation) Caracas
18	MF	Juan Arango	16 May 1980 (aged 27)	58	23	(Royal Spanish Football Federation) Mallorca
19	FW	Daniel Arismendi	4 July 1982 (aged 24)		5	(Venezuelan Football Federation) Maracaibo
20	DF	Héctor González	4 November 1977 (aged 29)	45	4	(Cyprus Football Association) AEK Larnaca
21	DF	Andrés Rouga	2 March 1982 (aged 25)	16	0	(Venezuelan Football Federation) Caracas
22	MF	Pedro Fernández	27 July 1977 (aged 29)			(Venezuelan Football Federation) Maracaibo

== Group B ==
=== Brazil ===
Head coach: Dunga

No.	Pos.	Player	Date of birth (age)	Caps	Goals	Club
1	GK	Helton	18 May 1978 (aged 29)	4	0	(Portuguese Football Federation) Porto
2	DF	Maicon	26 July 1981 (aged 25)	17	0	(Italian Football Federation) Inter Milan
3	DF	Alex	17 June 1982 (aged 25)	5	0	(Royal Dutch Football Association) PSV
4	DF	Juan	1 February 1979 (aged 28)	53	3	(German Football Association) Bayer Leverkusen
5	MF	Mineiro	2 August 1975 (aged 31)	8	0	(German Football Association) Hertha BSC
6	DF	Gilberto	25 April 1976 (aged 31)	17	1	(German Football Association) Hertha BSC
7	MF	Elano	14 June 1981 (aged 26)	12	2	(Ukrainian Association of Football) Shakhtar Donetsk
8	MF	Gilberto Silva (c)	7 October 1976 (aged 30)	54	3	(The Football Association) Arsenal
9	FW	Vágner Love	11 June 1984 (aged 23)	8	2	(Russian Football Union) CSKA Moscow
10	MF	Diego	28 February 1985 (aged 22)	13	1	(German Football Association) Werder Bremen
11	FW	Robinho	25 January 1984 (aged 23)	34	7	(Royal Spanish Football Federation) Real Madrid
12	GK	Doni	22 October 1979 (aged 27)	1	0	(Italian Football Federation) Roma
13	DF	Dani Alves	6 May 1983 (aged 24)	6	0	(Royal Spanish Football Federation) Sevilla
14	DF	Alex Silva	10 March 1985 (aged 22)	0	0	(Brazilian Football Confederation) São Paulo
15	DF	Naldo	10 September 1982 (aged 24)	2	0	(German Football Association) Werder Bremen
16	DF	Kléber	1 April 1980 (aged 27)	8	0	(Brazilian Football Confederation) Santos
17	MF	Josué	19 July 1979 (aged 27)	2	0	(Brazilian Football Confederation) São Paulo
18	MF	Fernando Menegazzo	3 May 1981 (aged 26)	1	0	(French Football Federation) Bordeaux
19	MF	Júlio Baptista	1 October 1981 (aged 25)	20	3	(The Football Association) Arsenal
20	MF	Anderson	13 April 1988 (aged 19)	0	0	(Portuguese Football Federation) Porto
21	FW	Afonso Alves	20 January 1981 (aged 26)	2	0	(Royal Dutch Football Association) Heerenveen
22	FW	Fred	3 October 1983 (aged 23)	10	4	(French Football Federation) Lyon

=== Chile ===
Head coach: (Uruguay) Nelson Acosta

No.	Pos.	Player	Date of birth (age)	Caps	Club
1	GK	Claudio Bravo	13 April 1983 (aged 24)	12	(Spain) Real Sociedad
2	MF	Álvaro Ormeño	4 April 1979 (aged 28)	2	(Argentina) Gimnasia y Esgrima (LP)
3	DF	Sebastián Roco	26 June 1983 (aged 24)	6	(Chile) Santiago Wanderers
4	DF	Ismael Fuentes	4 August 1981 (aged 25)	8	(Mexico) Chiapas
5	DF	Miguel Riffo	21 June 1981 (aged 26)	1	(Chile) Colo-Colo
6	MF	José Luis Cabión	14 November 1983 (aged 23)	5	(Chile) Deportes Melipilla
7	MF	Rodrigo Tello	14 October 1979 (aged 27)	26	(Portugal) Sporting CP
8	FW	Humberto Suazo	10 May 1981 (aged 26)	12	(Chile) Colo-Colo
9	FW	Reinaldo Navia	10 May 1978 (aged 29)	39	(Mexico) Atlas
10	FW	Jorge Valdivia (c)	19 October 1983 (aged 23)	21	(Brazil) Palmeiras
11	FW	Mark González	10 May 1984 (aged 23)	16	(England) Liverpool
12	GK	Nicolás Perić	19 October 1978 (aged 28)	4	(Chile) Audax Italiano
13	DF	Jorge Vargas	8 February 1976 (aged 31)	36	(Austria) Red Bull Salzburg
14	MF	Matías Fernández	15 May 1986 (aged 21)	9	(Spain) Villarreal
15	DF	Pablo Contreras	9 November 1978 (aged 28)	37	(Spain) Celta Vigo
16	MF	Manuel Iturra	23 June 1984 (aged 23)	15	Universidad de Chile
17	MF	Arturo Sanhueza	11 March 1979 (aged 28)	12	(Chile) Colo-Colo
18	MF	Rodrigo Meléndez	3 October 1977 (aged 29)	24	(Chile) Colo-Colo
19	DF	Gonzalo Jara	29 May 1985 (aged 22)	7	(Chile) Colo-Colo
20	MF	Gonzalo Fierro	21 March 1983 (aged 24)	3	(Chile) Colo-Colo
21	MF	Carlos Villanueva	5 February 1986 (aged 21)	4	(Chile) Audax Italiano
22	FW	Juan Gonzalo Lorca	15 January 1985 (aged 22)	5	(Chile) Colo-Colo

=== Ecuador ===
Head coach: (Colombia) Luis Fernando Suárez

No.	Pos.	Player	Date of birth (age)	Caps	Goals	Club
1	GK	Marcelo Elizaga	19 April 1972 (aged 35)	1	0	(Ecuadorian Football Federation) Emelec
2	DF	Jorge Guagua	28 September 1981 (aged 25)	16	1	(Argentine Football Association) Colón
3	DF	Iván Hurtado (c)	16 August 1974 (aged 32)	137	5	(Colombian Football Federation) Atlético Nacional
4	DF	Ulises de la Cruz	8 February 1974 (aged 33)	90	5	(The Football Association) Reading
5	MF	Patricio Urrutia	15 October 1977 (aged 29)	14	0	(Ecuadorian Football Federation) LDU Quito
6	MF	Pedro Quiñónez*	4 March 1986 (aged 21)	1	0	(Ecuadorian Football Federation) El Nacional
7	MF	David Quiroz	8 September 1982 (aged 24)	12	0	(Ecuadorian Football Federation) El Nacional
8	FW	Édison Méndez	16 March 1979 (aged 28)	68	10	(Royal Dutch Football Association) PSV
9	FW	Félix Borja	2 April 1983 (aged 24)	8	3	(Hellenic Football Federation) Olympiacos
10	FW	Felipe Caicedo	5 September 1988 (aged 18)	2	1	(Swiss Football Association) Basel
11	FW	Christian Benítez	1 May 1986 (aged 21)	8	3	(Ecuadorian Football Federation) El Nacional
12	GK	Cristian Mora	26 August 1979 (aged 27)	12	0	(Ecuadorian Football Federation) LDU Quito
13	DF	Renán Calle	8 September 1976 (aged 30)	10	1	(Ecuadorian Football Federation) LDU Quito
14	MF	Segundo Castillo	15 May 1982 (aged 25)	16	1	(Football Association of Serbia) Red Star Belgrade
15	DF	Óscar Bagüí	10 February 1983 (aged 24)	11	0	(Ecuadorian Football Federation) Olmedo
16	MF	Antonio Valencia	4 August 1985 (aged 21)	19	4	(The Football Association) Wigan Athletic
17	DF	Giovanny Espinoza	12 April 1977 (aged 30)	97	7	(Royal Dutch Football Association) Vitesse
18	DF	Néicer Reasco	23 July 1977 (aged 29)	34	0	(Brazilian Football Confederation) São Paulo
19	DF	Walter Ayoví	11 August 1979 (aged 27)	22	1	(Ecuadorian Football Federation) El Nacional
20	MF	Edwin Tenorio	16 June 1976 (aged 31)	75	0	(Ecuadorian Football Federation) LDU Quito
21	FW	Carlos Tenorio	14 May 1979 (aged 28)	31	10	(Qatar Football Association) Al Sadd
22	FW	Pablo Palacios	5 February 1982 (aged 25)	3	0	(Ecuadorian Football Federation) Deportivo Quito

- * Replaced Luis Caicedo on 15 June 2007 due to injury.

=== Mexico ===
Head coach: Hugo Sánchez

No.	Pos.	Player	Date of birth (age)	Caps	Goals	Club
1	GK	Oswaldo Sánchez	21 September 1973 (aged 33)	81	0	(Mexican Football Federation) Santos Laguna
2	DF	Jonny Magallón	21 November 1981 (aged 25)	10	0	(Mexican Football Federation) Guadalajara
3	DF	Fausto Pinto	8 August 1983 (aged 23)	0	0	(Mexican Football Federation) Pachuca
4	DF	Rafael Márquez (c)	13 February 1979 (aged 28)	76	9	(Royal Spanish Football Federation) Barcelona
5	MF	Israel Castro	20 December 1980 (aged 26)	?	0	(Mexican Football Federation) UNAM
6	MF	Gerardo Torrado	30 April 1979 (aged 28)	71	3	(Mexican Football Federation) Cruz Azul
7	FW	Alberto Medina	29 May 1983 (aged 24)	34	2	(Mexican Football Federation) Guadalajara
8	MF	Jaime Correa	6 August 1979 (aged 27)	0	0	(Mexican Football Federation) Pachuca
9	FW	Luis Ángel Landín*	23 July 1985 (aged 21)	1	0	(Mexican Football Federation) Pachuca
10	FW	Cuauhtémoc Blanco	17 January 1973 (aged 34)	92	32	(United States Soccer Federation) Chicago Fire
11	FW	Ramón Morales	10 October 1975 (aged 31)	51	5	(Mexican Football Federation) Guadalajara
12	FW	Juan Carlos Cacho	3 May 1982 (aged 25)	0	0	(Mexican Football Federation) Pachuca
13	GK	Guillermo Ochoa	13 July 1985 (aged 21)	6	0	(Mexican Football Federation) América
14	DF	Gonzalo Pineda	8 August 1983 (aged 23)	37	1	(Mexican Football Federation) Guadalajara
15	DF	José Antonio Castro	11 August 1980 (aged 26)	19	0	(Mexican Football Federation) América
16	MF	Jaime Lozano	29 September 1979 (aged 27)	29	12	(Mexican Football Federation) Tigres UANL
17	FW	Adolfo Bautista	15 May 1979 (aged 28)	26	8	(Mexican Football Federation) Guadalajara
18	MF	Andrés Guardado	28 September 1986 (aged 20)	19	1	(Mexican Football Federation) Atlas
19	FW	Omar Bravo	4 March 1980 (aged 27)	41	10	(Mexican Football Federation) Guadalajara
20	MF	Fernando Arce	24 April 1980 (aged 27)	19	1	(Mexican Football Federation) Morelia
21	FW	Nery Castillo	13 June 1984 (aged 23)	4	2	(Hellenic Football Federation) Olympiacos
22	DF	Francisco Javier Rodríguez	20 October 1981 (aged 25)	38	1	(Mexican Football Federation) Guadalajara

- * Replaced Jared Borgetti on 26 June 2007 due to injury.

== Group C ==
=== Argentina ===
Head coach: Alfio Basile

No.	Pos.	Player	Date of birth (age)	Caps	Goals	Club
1	GK	Roberto Abbondanzieri	19 August 1972 (aged 34)	30	0	(Royal Spanish Football Federation) Getafe
2	DF	Roberto Ayala (c)	14 April 1973 (aged 34)	109	7	(Royal Spanish Football Federation) Valencia
3	DF	Cata Díaz	13 March 1979 (aged 28)	3	0	(Argentine Football Association) Boca Juniors
4	DF	Hugo Ibarra	1 April 1974 (aged 33)	7	0	(Argentine Football Association) Boca Juniors
5	MF	Fernando Gago	10 April 1986 (aged 21)	1	0	(Royal Spanish Football Federation) Real Madrid
6	DF	Gabriel Heinze	19 April 1978 (aged 29)	34	1	(The Football Association) Manchester United
7	FW	Rodrigo Palacio	5 February 1982 (aged 25)	4	0	(Argentine Football Association) Boca Juniors
8	DF	Javier Zanetti	10 August 1973 (aged 33)	103	5	(Italian Football Federation) Inter Milan
9	FW	Hernán Crespo	5 July 1975 (aged 31)	62	32	(Italian Football Federation) Inter Milan
10	MF	Juan Román Riquelme	24 June 1978 (aged 29)	38	8	(Argentine Football Association) Boca Juniors
11	FW	Carlos Tevez	5 February 1984 (aged 23)	27	4	(The Football Association) West Ham United
12	GK	Juan Pablo Carrizo	6 May 1984 (aged 23)	5	0	(Argentine Football Association) River Plate
13	MF	Lucho González	19 January 1981 (aged 26)	33	5	(Portuguese Football Federation) Porto
14	MF	Javier Mascherano	8 June 1984 (aged 23)	22	0	(The Football Association) Liverpool
15	DF	Gabriel Milito	7 September 1980 (aged 26)	19	0	(Royal Spanish Football Federation) Real Zaragoza
16	MF	Pablo Aimar	3 November 1979 (aged 27)	44	7	(Royal Spanish Football Federation) Real Zaragoza
17	DF	Nicolás Burdisso	12 April 1981 (aged 26)	13	0	(Italian Football Federation) Inter Milan
18	MF	Lionel Messi	24 June 1987 (aged 20)	14	4	(Royal Spanish Football Federation) Barcelona
19	MF	Esteban Cambiasso	18 August 1980 (aged 26)	28	2	(Italian Football Federation) Inter Milan
20	MF	Juan Sebastián Verón	9 March 1975 (aged 32)	58	9	(Argentine Football Association) Estudiantes La Plata
21	FW	Diego Milito	12 June 1979 (aged 28)	10	3	(Royal Spanish Football Federation) Real Zaragoza
22	GK	Agustín Orión*	26 June 1981 (aged 26)	1	0	(Argentine Football Association) San Lorenzo

- Replaced Oscar Ustari on 18 June 2007 due to injury.

=== Colombia ===
Head coach: Jorge Luis Pinto

No.	Pos.	Player	Date of birth (age)	Caps	Goals	Club
1	GK	Miguel Calero (c)	14 April 1971 (aged 36)			(Mexican Football Federation) Pachuca
2	DF	Iván Córdoba	11 August 1976 (aged 30)			(Italian Football Federation) Inter Milan
3	DF	Mario Yepes	13 January 1976 (aged 31)			(French Football Federation) Paris Saint-Germain
4	DF	Gerardo Vallejo	3 December 1976 (aged 30)			(Colombian Football Federation) Deportes Tolima
5	DF	Javier Arizala	21 April 1984 (aged 23)			(Colombian Football Federation) Deportes Tolima
6	MF	Fabián Vargas	17 April 1980 (aged 27)			(Brazilian Football Confederation) Internacional
7	FW	Edixon Perea	20 April 1984 (aged 23)			(French Football Federation) Bordeaux
8	MF	David Ferreira	9 August 1979 (aged 27)			(Brazilian Football Confederation) Atlético Paranaense
9	MF	Álvaro Domínguez	10 August 1981 (aged 25)			(Colombian Football Federation) Deportivo Cali
10	MF	Andrés Chitiva	13 August 1979 (aged 27)			(Mexican Football Federation) Pachuca
11	FW	Hugo Rodallega	25 July 1985 (aged 21)			(Mexican Football Federation) Necaxa
12	GK	Róbinson Zapata	30 September 1978 (aged 28)			(Colombian Football Federation) Cúcuta Deportivo
13	DF	Vladimir Marín	26 September 1979 (aged 27)			(Paraguayan Football Association) Libertad
14	DF	Luis Perea	30 January 1979 (aged 28)			(Royal Spanish Football Federation) Atlético Madrid
15	MF	Jhon Viáfara	27 October 1978 (aged 28)			(The Football Association) Southampton
16	DF	Jair Benítez	12 January 1979 (aged 28)			(Colombian Football Federation) Deportivo Cali
17	MF	Jaime Castrillón	5 April 1983 (aged 24)			(Colombian Football Federation) Independiente Medellín
18	FW	Luis Gabriel Rey	20 February 1980 (aged 27)			(Mexican Football Federation) Morelia
19	FW	César Valoyes	5 January 1984 (aged 23)			(Colombian Football Federation) Independiente Medellín
20	MF	Macnelly Torres	1 November 1984 (aged 22)			(Colombian Football Federation) Cúcuta Deportivo
21	MF	Jorge Banguero	4 October 1974 (aged 32)			(Colombian Football Federation) América de Cali
22	DF	Camilo Zúñiga	14 December 1985 (aged 21)			(Colombian Football Federation) Atlético Nacional

=== Paraguay ===
Head coach: (Argentina) Gerardo Martino

No.	Pos.	Player	Date of birth (age)	Caps	Goals	Club
1	GK	Justo Villar (c)	30 June 1977 (aged 29)	44	0	(Argentine Football Association) Newell's Old Boys
2	DF	Darío Verón	26 July 1979 (aged 27)	6	0	(Mexican Football Federation) Universidad Nacional
3	DF	Claudio Morel	2 February 1978 (aged 29)	8	0	(Argentine Football Association) Boca Juniors
4	DF	Julio Manzur	22 June 1981 (aged 26)	20	0	(Paraguayan Football Association) Guaraní
5	DF	Julio César Cáceres	5 October 1979 (aged 27)	38	2	(Mexican Football Federation) Tigres UANL
6	DF	Carlos Bonet	2 October 1977 (aged 29)	39	1	(Paraguayan Football Association) Libertad
7	FW	Salvador Cabañas	5 August 1980 (aged 26)	22	1	(Mexican Football Federation) América
8	MF	Édgar Barreto	15 July 1984 (aged 22)	22	0	(Royal Dutch Football Association) NEC Nijmegen
9	FW	Roque Santa Cruz	16 August 1981 (aged 25)	50	14	(German Football Association) Bayern Munich
10	MF	Julio dos Santos	5 May 1983 (aged 24)	23	5	(German Football Association) VfL Wolfsburg
11	DF	Aureliano Torres	16 June 1982 (aged 25)	14	1	(Argentine Football Association) San Lorenzo
12	GK	Joel Zayas	17 September 1977 (aged 29)	0	0	(Bolivian Football Federation) Bolívar
13	MF	Domingo Salcedo	9 November 1983 (aged 23)	6	0	(Paraguayan Football Association) Cerro Porteño
14	DF	Paulo da Silva	1 February 1980 (aged 27)	41	0	(Mexican Football Federation) Toluca
15	MF	Édgar González	4 October 1979 (aged 27)	11	0	(Paraguayan Football Association) Cerro Porteño
16	MF	Cristian Riveros	16 October 1982 (aged 24)	19	1	(Paraguayan Football Association) Libertad
17	FW	Dante López	16 August 1983 (aged 23)	11	3	(Italian Football Federation) Crotone
18	FW	Óscar Cardozo	20 May 1983 (aged 24)	5	1	(Argentine Football Association) Newell's Old Boys
19	MF	Jonathan Santana	19 October 1981 (aged 25)	1	0	(German Football Association) VfL Wolfsburg
20	MF	Enrique Vera	10 March 1979 (aged 28)	4	0	(Ecuadorian Football Federation) LDU Quito
21	FW	Nelson Cuevas	10 January 1980 (aged 27)	41	6	(Mexican Football Federation) América
22	GK	Aldo Bobadilla	20 April 1976 (aged 31)	11	0	(Argentine Football Association) Boca Juniors

=== United States ===
Head coach: Bob Bradley

No.	Pos.	Player	Date of birth (age)	Caps	Goals	Club
2	DF	Marvell Wynne	8 May 1986 (aged 21)	0	0	(Canadian Soccer Association) Toronto FC
3	DF	Jay DeMerit	4 December 1979 (aged 27)	3	0	(The Football Association) Watford
4	DF	Bobby Boswell	15 March 1983 (aged 24)	2	0	(United States Soccer Federation) D.C. United
5	MF	Benny Feilhaber	19 January 1985 (aged 22)	8	2	(German Football Association) Hamburger SV
6	DF	Heath Pearce	13 August 1984 (aged 22)	6	0	(Danish Football Association) Nordsjælland
7	DF	Danny Califf	17 March 1980 (aged 27)	14	1	(Danish Football Association) AaB
8	FW	Herculez Gomez	6 April 1982 (aged 25)	0	0	(United States Soccer Federation) Colorado Rapids
9	FW	Eddie Johnson	31 March 1984 (aged 23)	26	10	(United States Soccer Federation) Kansas City Wizards
10	FW	Charlie Davies	25 June 1986 (aged 21)	1	0	(Swedish Football Association) Hammarby
11	FW	Eddie Gaven	25 October 1986 (aged 20)	3	0	(United States Soccer Federation) Columbus Crew
12	DF	Jimmy Conrad	12 February 1977 (aged 30)	20	1	(United States Soccer Federation) Kansas City Wizards
13	DF	Jonathan Bornstein	7 November 1984 (aged 22)	7	1	(United States Soccer Federation) Chivas USA
14	MF	Ben Olsen	3 May 1977 (aged 30)	34	6	(United States Soccer Federation) D.C. United
15	DF	Drew Moor	15 January 1984 (aged 23)	0	0	(United States Soccer Federation) FC Dallas
16	MF	Sacha Kljestan	9 September 1985 (aged 21)	1	0	(United States Soccer Federation) Chivas USA
17	MF	Kyle Beckerman	23 April 1982 (aged 25)	1	0	(United States Soccer Federation) Colorado Rapids
18	GK	Kasey Keller (c)	29 November 1969 (aged 37)	100	0	(German Football Association) Borussia Mönchengladbach
19	MF	Ricardo Clark	10 May 1983 (aged 24)	6	0	(United States Soccer Federation) Houston Dynamo
20	FW	Taylor Twellman	29 February 1980 (aged 27)	24	6	(United States Soccer Federation) New England Revolution
21	MF	Justin Mapp	18 October 1984 (aged 22)	5	0	(United States Soccer Federation) Chicago Fire
23	GK	Brad Guzan	9 September 1984 (aged 22)	1	0	(United States Soccer Federation) Chivas USA
25	MF	Lee Nguyen	7 October 1986 (aged 20)	1	0	(Royal Dutch Football Association) PSV

- Information and source gathered from ussoccer.com
