= 2007 Copa América Group A =

Football tournament group stage

Group A of the 2007 Copa América was one of the three groups of competing nations in the 2007 Copa América. It comprised Venezuela (the host nation), Bolivia, Peru, and Uruguay. Group play ran from 26 June to 3 July 2007.

Venezuela, Peru and Uruguay advanced from the group to the knockout phase.

== Standings ==
Team	Pld	W	D	L	GF	GA	GD	Pts
Venezuela	3	1	2	0	4	2	+2	5
Peru	3	1	1	1	5	4	+1	4
Uruguay	3	1	1	1	1	3	−2	4
Bolivia	3	0	2	1	4	5	−1	2

== Matches ==
All times are in local, Venezuela Time (UTC−04:00).

=== Uruguay v Peru ===
26 June 2007
18:05

Uruguay	0–3	Peru
	Report	Villalta 27'; Mariño 70'; Guerrero 88'

Estadio Metropolitano de Mérida, Mérida
Attendance: 23,000
Referee: Carlos Amarilla (Paraguay)

Uruguay	Peru

GK	1	Fabián Carini
RB	14	Carlos Diogo
CB	2	Diego Lugano (c)	(yellow card) 44'
CB	3	Diego Godín
LB	6	Darío Rodríguez	(yellow card) 59'
DM	5	Pablo García
RM	15	Diego Pérez
LM	11	Fabián Estoyanoff		(substituted off) 80'
AM	18	Fabián Canobbio		(substituted off) 46'
FW	21	Diego Forlán
FW	22	Vicente Sánchez		(substituted off) 66'
Substitutions:
MF	7	Cristian Rodríguez		(substituted on) 46'
FW	13	Sebastián Abreu		(substituted on) 66'
MF	9	Gonzalo Vargas		(substituted on) 80'
Manager:
Óscar Tabárez

GK	1	Leao Butrón
RB	22	John Galliquio
CB	2	Miguel Villalta
CB	3	Santiago Acasiete
CB	5	Alberto Rodríguez
LB	4	Walter Vílchez
CM	18	Pedro García	(yellow card) 51'	(substituted off) 55'
CM	8	Juan Carlos Bazalar
CAM	17	Jefferson Farfán		(substituted off) 80'
FW	9	Paolo Guerrero	(yellow card) 55'
FW	14	Claudio Pizarro (c)		(substituted off) 77'
Substitutions:
MF	10	Juan Carlos Mariño	(yellow card) 90'	(substituted on) 55'
FW	16	Andrés Mendoza		(substituted on) 77'
DF	13	Paolo de la Haza		(substituted on) 80'
Manager:
Julio César Uribe

=== Venezuela v Bolivia ===
26 June 2007
20:50

Venezuela	2–2	Bolivia
Maldonado 20'; Páez 55'	Report	Moreno 38'; Arce 84'

Estadio Polideportivo de Pueblo Nuevo, San Cristóbal
Attendance: 40,000
Referee: Mauricio Reinoso (Ecuador)

Venezuela	Bolivia

GK	1	Renny Vega
RB	20	Héctor González
CB	3	José Manuel Rey
CB	6	Alejandro Cichero
LB	17	Jorge Rojas	(yellow card) 23'
CM	5	Miguel Mea Vitali
CM	8	Luis Vera (c)
CM	11	Ricardo Páez		(substituted off) 72'
AM	18	Juan Arango
FW	9	Giancarlo Maldonado		(substituted off) 77'
FW	15	Fernando de Ornelas		(substituted off) 59'
Substitutions:
MF	14	Alejandro Guerra		(substituted on) 59'
DF	13	Leonel Vielma		(substituted on) 72'
FW	7	José Torrealba		(substituted on) 77'
Manager:
Richard Páez

GK	12	Sergio Galarza
RB	14	Miguel Ángel Hoyos
CB	16	Ronald Raldes
CB	2	Juan Manuel Peña (c)
LB	4	Lorgio Álvarez
RM	6	Ronald García
CM	5	Leonel Reyes	(yellow card) 10'	(substituted off) 59'
LM	8	Gualberto Mojica
AM	10	Joselito Vaca		(substituted off) 70'
FW	17	Juan Carlos Arce
FW	9	Jaime Moreno		(substituted off) 74'
Substitutions:
FW	22	Darwin Peña		(substituted on) 59'
MF	18	Gonzalo Galindo		(substituted on) 70'
FW	11	Diego Cabrera		(substituted on) 74'
Manager:
Erwin Sánchez

=== Bolivia v Uruguay ===
30 June 2007
16:05

Bolivia	0–1	Uruguay
	Report	Sánchez 58'

Estadio Polideportivo de Pueblo Nuevo, San Cristóbal
Attendance: 40,000
Referee: Baldomero Toledo (United States)

Bolivia	Uruguay

GK	12	Sergio Galarza
RB	14	Miguel Ángel Hoyos
CB	16	Ronald Raldes
CB	2	Juan Manuel Peña (c)	(yellow card) 66'
LB	4	Lorgio Álvarez
RM	6	Ronald García		(substituted off) 29'
CM	5	Leonel Reyes		(substituted off) 71'
LM	8	Gualberto Mojica
AM	10	Joselito Vaca		(substituted off) 62'
FW	17	Juan Carlos Arce
FW	9	Jaime Moreno
Substitutions:
MF	20	Sacha Lima	(yellow card) 75'	(substituted on) 29'
FW	11	Diego Cabrera		(substituted on) 62'
FW	22	Darwin Peña		(substituted on) 71'
Manager:
Erwin Sánchez

GK	1	Fabián Carini
RB	16	Maxi Pereira
CB	2	Diego Lugano (c)
CB	19	Andrés Scotti
LB	6	Darío Rodríguez
RM	14	Carlos Diogo	(yellow card) 19'	(substituted off) 56'
CM	5	Pablo García	(yellow card) 27'
CM	15	Diego Pérez
LM	7	Cristian Rodríguez		(substituted off) 89'
FW	21	Diego Forlán		(substituted off) 82'
FW	22	Vicente Sánchez
Substitutions:
MF	20	Nacho González		(substituted on) 56'
LM	11	Fabián Estoyanoff		(substituted on) 82'
DF	8	Walter Gargano		(substituted on) 89'
Manager:
Óscar Tabárez

=== Venezuela v Peru ===
30 June 2007
18:20

Venezuela	2–0	Peru
Cichero 48'; Arismendi 79'	Report

Estadio Polideportivo de Pueblo Nuevo, San Cristóbal
Attendance: 40,000
Referee: Benito Archundia (Mexico)

Venezuela	Peru

GK	1	Renny Vega
RB	20	Héctor González
CB	3	José Manuel Rey
CB	6	Alejandro Cichero	(yellow card) 90+3'
LB	21	Andrés Rouga	(yellow card) 17'	(substituted off) 37'
CM	5	Miguel Mea Vitali
CM	8	Luis Vera (c)
CM	11	Ricardo Páez	(yellow card) 56' (yellow-red card) 78'
AM	18	Juan Arango		(substituted off) 74'
FW	9	Giancarlo Maldonado	(yellow card) 14'
FW	15	Fernando de Ornelas		(substituted off) 63'
Substitutions:
MF	16	Edder Pérez		(substituted on) 37'
DF	19	Daniel Arismendi		(substituted on) 63'
MF	10	César González		(substituted on) 74'
Manager:
Richard Páez

GK	1	Leao Butrón
RB	22	John Galliquio		(substituted off) 75'
CB	2	Miguel Villalta		(substituted off) 51'
CB	3	Santiago Acasiete
CB	5	Alberto Rodríguez	(yellow card) 53'
LB	4	Walter Vílchez
CM	18	Pedro García
CM	8	Juan Carlos Bazalar
CAM	17	Jefferson Farfán
FW	9	Paolo Guerrero
FW	14	Claudio Pizarro (c)		(substituted off) 67'
Substitutions:
MF	10	Juan Carlos Mariño		(substituted on) 51'
MF	19	Damián Ísmodes		(substituted on) 67'
FW	16	Andrés Mendoza		(substituted on) 75'
Manager:
Julio César Uribe

=== Peru v Bolivia ===
3 July 2007
18:35

Peru	2–2	Bolivia
Pizarro 34', 85'	Report	Moreno 24'; Campos 45'

Estadio Metropolitano de Mérida, Mérida
Attendance: 42,000
Referee: Carlos Chandía (Chile)

Peru	Bolivia

GK	1	Leao Butrón
RB	22	John Galliquio		(substituted off) 55'
CB	5	Alberto Rodríguez	(yellow card) 73'
CB	15	Edgar Villamarín
LB	4	Walter Vílchez
DM	13	Paolo de la Haza	(yellow card) 44'
RM	10	Juan Carlos Mariño
LM	19	Damián Ísmodes		(substituted off) 70'
AM	17	Jefferson Farfán	(yellow card) 24'	(substituted off) 46'
FW	9	Paolo Guerrero
FW	14	Claudio Pizarro (c)
Substitutions:
FW	11	Ysrael Zúñiga	(yellow card) 90+2'	(substituted on) 46'
DF	6	Jhoel Herrera	(yellow card) 76' (yellow-red card) 78'	(substituted on) 55'
FW	20	Roberto Jiménez	(yellow card) 87'	(substituted on) 70'
Manager:
Julio César Uribe

GK	1	Hugo Suárez
RB	14	Miguel Ángel Hoyos
CB	16	Ronald Raldes	(yellow card) 60'
CB	2	Juan Manuel Peña (c)	(yellow card) 90+1'
LB	4	Lorgio Álvarez
RM	8	Gualberto Mojica		(substituted off) 80'
CM	5	Leonel Reyes	(yellow card) 84'
LM	21	Jhasmani Campos		(substituted off) 67'
AM	10	Joselito Vaca
FW	19	Augusto Andaveris		(substituted off) 58'
FW	9	Jaime Moreno
Substitutions:
FW	17	Juan Carlos Arce		(substituted on) 58'
MF	18	Gonzalo Galindo	(yellow card) 84'	(substituted on) 67'
DF	15	Jorge Ortiz		(substituted on) 80'
Manager:
Erwin Sánchez

=== Venezuela v Uruguay ===
3 July 2007
20:50

Venezuela	0–0	Uruguay
	Report

Estadio Metropolitano de Mérida, Mérida
Attendance: 42,000
Referee: Carlos Simon (Brazil)

Venezuela	Uruguay

GK	1	Renny Vega
RB	20	Héctor González	(yellow card) 18'
CB	3	José Manuel Rey
CB	6	Alejandro Cichero
LB	16	Edder Pérez
RM	10	César González
CM	5	Miguel Mea Vitali	(yellow card) 41'	(substituted off) 75'
CM	8	Luis Vera (c)
LM	18	Juan Arango
FW	9	Giancarlo Maldonado		(substituted off) 57'
FW	15	Fernando de Ornelas		(substituted off) 65'
Substitutions:
FW	7	José Torrealba		(substituted on) 57'
MF	14	Alejandro Guerra		(substituted on) 65'
MF	22	Pedro Fernández		(substituted on) 75'
Manager:
Richard Páez

GK	1	Fabián Carini
RB	4	Jorge Fucile	(yellow card) 55'
CB	2	Diego Lugano (c)
CB	19	Andrés Scotti
LB	6	Darío Rodríguez
RM	16	Maxi Pereira	(yellow card) 77'
CM	5	Pablo García
CM	15	Diego Pérez
LM	7	Cristian Rodríguez
FW	21	Diego Forlán		(substituted off) 79'
FW	22	Vicente Sánchez		(substituted off) 67'
Substitutions:
FW	10	Álvaro Recoba		(substituted on) 67'
FW	13	Sebastián Abreu		(substituted on) 79'
Manager:
Óscar Tabárez
