= 2007 Copa América knockout stage =

Football tournament knockout stage

The 2007 Copa América knockout stage was the elimination stage of the Copa América, following the group stage. It began on 7 July 2007 and consisted of the quarter-finals, the semi-finals, the third-place play-off, and the final held at the Estadio José Pachencho Romero on 15 July, in Maracaibo. No extra time was to be played if any match in the final stages finished tied after regulation; the match would go straight to a penalty shoot-out.

All times are in local, Venezuela Time (UTC−04:00).

== Qualified teams ==
The top two placed teams from each of the three groups, plus the two best-placed third teams, qualified for the knockout stage.

Group	Winners	Runners-up	Third-placed team (Best two qualify)
A	Venezuela	Peru	Uruguay
B	Mexico	Brazil	Chile
C	Argentina	Paraguay	—N/a

== Bracket ==
Quarter-finals
7 July – San Cristóbal
Venezuela	1
Uruguay	4
7 July – Puerto la Cruz
Chile	1
Brazil	6
8 July – Maturín
Mexico	6
Paraguay	0
8 July – Barquisimeto
Argentina	4
Peru	0

Semi-finals
10 July – Maracaibo
Uruguay	2 (4)
Brazil (p)	2 (5)
11 July – Ciudad Guayana
Mexico	0
Argentina	3

Final
15 July – Maracaibo
Brazil	3
Argentina	0
Third place
14 July – Caracas
Uruguay	1
Mexico	3

== Quarter-finals ==
=== Venezuela v Uruguay ===
7 July 2007
18:05

Venezuela	1–4	Uruguay
Arango 41'	Report	Forlán 38', 90+1'; García 64'; Rodríguez 86'

Estadio Polideportivo de Pueblo Nuevo, San Cristóbal
Attendance: 41,200
Referee: Carlos Chandía (Chile)

Venezuela	Uruguay

GK	1	Renny Vega
RB	20	Héctor González
CB	3	José Manuel Rey
CB	6	Alejandro Cichero
LB	17	Jorge Rojas
RM	11	Ricardo Páez
CM	5	Miguel Mea Vitali	(substituted off) 76'
CM	8	Luis Vera (c)
LM	18	Juan Arango
SS	15	Fernando de Ornelas	(substituted off) 46'
CF	9	Giancarlo Maldonado	(substituted off) 71'
Substitutions:
FW	19	Daniel Arismendi	(substituted on) 46'
MF	10	César González	(substituted on) 71'
MF	14	Alejandro Guerra	(substituted on) 76'
Manager:
Richard Páez

GK	1	Fabián Carini
RB	4	Jorge Fucile
CB	2	Diego Lugano (c)
CB	19	Andrés Scotti
LB	6	Darío Rodríguez		(substituted off) 89'
RM	16	Maxi Pereira
CM	5	Pablo García	(yellow card) 50'
CM	15	Diego Pérez
LM	7	Cristian Rodríguez
SS	10	Álvaro Recoba		(substituted off) 79'
CF	21	Diego Forlán	(yellow card) 67'
Substitutions:
MF	20	Nacho González	(yellow card) 83'	(substituted on) 79'
DF	3	Diego Godín		(substituted on) 89'
Manager:
Óscar Tabárez

=== Chile v Brazil ===
7 July 2007
20:50

Chile	1–6	Brazil
Suazo 76'	Report	Juan 16'; Baptista 23'; Robinho 27', 50'; Josué 68'; Vágner Love 85'

Estadio Olímpico Luis Ramos, Puerto la Cruz
Attendance: 38,000
Referee: Jorge Larrionda (Uruguay)

Chile	Brazil

GK	1	Claudio Bravo
RB	2	Álvaro Ormeño	(yellow card) 49'
CB	4	Ismael Fuentes
CB	19	Gonzalo Jara
LB	15	Pablo Contreras
RM	20	Gonzalo Fierro		(substituted off) 46'
CM	17	Arturo Sanhueza (c)	(yellow card) 45'
CM	16	Manuel Iturra	(yellow card) 19'
LM	11	Mark González		(substituted off) 66'
CF	22	Juan Gonzalo Lorca		(substituted off) 56'
CF	8	Humberto Suazo
Substitutions:
MF	10	Jorge Valdivia		(substituted on) 46'
MF	6	José Luis Cabión		(substituted on) 56'
MF	13	Matías Fernández		(substituted on) 66'
Manager:
(Uruguay) Nelson Acosta

GK	12	Doni
RB	2	Maicon	(yellow card) 32'	(substituted off) 71'
CB	3	Alex
CB	4	Juan		(substituted off) 73'
LB	6	Gilberto
CM	5	Mineiro
CM	8	Gilberto Silva (c)	(yellow card) 62'
CM	17	Josué
RF	19	Júlio Baptista
CF	9	Vágner Love
LF	11	Robinho		(substituted off) 65'
Substitutions:
FW	21	Afonso Alves		(substituted on) 65'
MF	7	Elano	(yellow card) 77'	(substituted on) 71'
DF	15	Naldo		(substituted on) 73'
Manager:
Dunga

=== Mexico v Paraguay ===
8 July 2007
16:05

Mexico	6–0	Paraguay
Castillo 5' (pen.), 38'; Torrado 27'; Arce 79'; Blanco 87' (pen.); Bravo 90+1'	Report

Estadio Monumental de Maturín, Maturín
Attendance: 52,000
Referee: Sergio Pezzotta (Argentina)

Mexico	Paraguay

GK	1	Oswaldo Sánchez
RB	8	Jaime Correa
CB	2	Jonny Magallón	(yellow card) 61'
CB	4	Rafael Márquez (c)
LB	6	Gerardo Torrado
CM	20	Fernando Arce		(substituted off) 80'
CM	5	Israel Castro
CM	18	Andrés Guardado
RF	21	Nery Castillo		(substituted off) 54'
CF	12	Juan Carlos Cacho		(substituted off) 65'
LF	3	Fausto Pinto
Substitutions:
FW	17	Adolfo Bautista		(substituted on) 54'
FW	19	Omar Bravo		(substituted on) 65'
FW	10	Cuauhtémoc Blanco		(substituted on) 80'
Manager:
Hugo Sánchez

GK	22	Aldo Bobadilla	(red card) 2'
CB	2	Darío Verón		(substituted off) 46'
CB	5	Julio César Cáceres (c)
CB	14	Paulo da Silva
DM	16	Cristian Riveros
RM	6	Carlos Bonet
CM	8	Édgar Barreto	(yellow card) 64'
CM	19	Jonathan Santana		(substituted off) 4'
LM	3	Claudio Morel
CF	9	Roque Santa Cruz
CF	18	Óscar Cardozo		(substituted off) 67'
Substitutions:
GK	12	Joel Zayas		(substituted on) 4'
MF	20	Enrique Vera		(substituted on) 46'
FW	7	Salvador Cabañas		(substituted on) 67'
Manager:
(Argentina) Gerardo Martino

=== Argentina v Peru ===
8 July 2007
18:50

Argentina	4–0	Peru
Riquelme 47', 85'; Messi 61'; Mascherano 75'	Report

Estadio Metropolitano de Fútbol de Lara, Barquisimeto
Attendance: 38,800
Referee: Carlos Simon (Brazil)

Argentina	Peru

GK	1	Roberto Abbondanzieri
RB	8	Javier Zanetti
CB	2	Roberto Ayala (c)	(yellow card) 15'
CB	15	Gabriel Milito
LB	6	Gabriel Heinze
DM	19	Esteban Cambiasso		(substituted off) 83'
DM	14	Javier Mascherano
CM	20	Juan Sebastián Verón		(substituted off) 71'
AM	18	Lionel Messi
AM	10	Juan Román Riquelme
CF	21	Diego Milito		(substituted off) 46'
Substitutions:
FW	11	Carlos Tevez		(substituted on) 46'
MF	5	Fernando Gago		(substituted on) 71'
MF	16	Pablo Aimar		(substituted on) 83'
Manager:
Alfio Basile

GK	1	Leao Butrón
RB	2	Miguel Villalta
CB	3	Santiago Acasiete	(yellow card) 1'
CB	13	Paolo de la Haza	(yellow card) 30'
LB	4	Walter Vílchez
CM	22	John Galliquio
CM	8	Juan Carlos Bazalar
CM	15	Edgar Villamarín		(substituted off) 64'
AM	10	Juan Carlos Mariño		(substituted off) 74'
CF	9	Paolo Guerrero		(substituted off) 55'
CF	14	Claudio Pizarro (c)
Substitutions:
MF	18	Pedro García		(substituted on) 55'
FW	11	Ysrael Zúñiga		(substituted on) 64'
FW	16	Andrés Mendoza		(substituted on) 74'
Manager:
Julio César Uribe

== Semi-finals ==
=== Uruguay v Brazil ===
10 July 2007
20:50

Uruguay	2–2	Brazil
Forlán 36'; Abreu 69'	Report	Maicon 13'; Baptista 41'
Penalties
Forlán (penalty missed); Scotti (penalty scored); González (penalty scored); C. Rodríguez (penalty scored); Abreu (penalty scored); García (penalty missed); Lugano (penalty missed)	4–5	(penalty scored) Robinho; (penalty scored) Juan; (penalty scored) Gilberto Silva; (penalty missed) A. Alves; (penalty scored) Diego; (penalty missed) Fernando; (penalty scored) Gilberto

Estadio José Pachencho Romero, Maracaibo
Attendance: 38,100
Referee: Óscar Ruiz (Colombia)

Uruguay	Brazil

GK	1	Fabián Carini
RB	4	Jorge Fucile
CB	2	Diego Lugano (c)
CB	19	Andrés Scotti	(yellow card) 51'
LB	6	Darío Rodríguez	(yellow card) 37'	(substituted off) 46'
RM	16	Maxi Pereira
CM	5	Pablo García
CM	15	Diego Pérez	(yellow card) 74'	(substituted off) 75'
LM	7	Cristian Rodríguez
SS	10	Álvaro Recoba		(substituted off) 46'
CF	21	Diego Forlán
Substitutions:
FW	13	Sebastián Abreu		(substituted on) 46'
MF	20	Nacho González		(substituted on) 46'
MF	8	Walter Gargano		(substituted on) 75'
Manager:
Óscar Tabárez

GK	12	Doni
RB	2	Maicon
CB	3	Alex
CB	4	Juan
LB	6	Gilberto	(yellow card) 36'
CM	5	Mineiro
CM	8	Gilberto Silva (c)	(yellow card) 90+1'
CM	17	Josué		(substituted off) 73'
RF	19	Júlio Baptista		(substituted off) 73'
CF	9	Vágner Love		(substituted off) 79'
LF	11	Robinho
Substitutions:
MF	10	Diego		(substituted on) 73'
MF	18	Fernando	(yellow card) 77'	(substituted on) 73'
FW	21	Afonso Alves		(substituted on) 79'
Manager:
Dunga

=== Mexico v Argentina ===
11 July 2007
20:50

Mexico	0–3	Argentina
	Report	Heinze 45'; Messi 61'; Riquelme 65' (pen.)

Polideportivo Cachamay, Ciudad Guayana
Attendance: 41,600
Referee: Carlos Chandía (Chile)

Mexico	Argentina

GK	1	Oswaldo Sánchez
RB	8	Jaime Correa		(substituted off) 83'
CB	2	Jonny Magallón
CB	4	Rafael Márquez (c)	(yellow card) 69'
LB	6	Gerardo Torrado	(yellow card) 43'	(substituted off) 46'
CM	20	Fernando Arce
CM	5	Israel Castro
CM	18	Andrés Guardado
RF	21	Nery Castillo
CF	12	Juan Carlos Cacho		(substituted off) 46'
LF	3	Fausto Pinto
Substitutions:
FW	7	Alberto Medina		(substituted on) 46'
FW	19	Omar Bravo		(substituted on) 46'
DF	14	Gonzalo Pineda		(substituted on) 83'
Manager:
Hugo Sánchez

GK	1	Roberto Abbondanzieri
RB	8	Javier Zanetti
CB	2	Roberto Ayala (c)
CB	15	Gabriel Milito
LB	6	Gabriel Heinze
DM	19	Esteban Cambiasso
DM	14	Javier Mascherano
CM	20	Juan Sebastián Verón	(yellow card) 34'	(substituted off) 78'
AM	18	Lionel Messi	(yellow card) 50'
AM	10	Juan Román Riquelme		(substituted off) 86'
CF	11	Carlos Tevez		(substituted off) 78'
Substitutions:
MF	5	Fernando Gago		(substituted on) 78'
FW	7	Rodrigo Palacio		(substituted on) 78'
MF	16	Pablo Aimar		(substituted on) 86'
Manager:
Alfio Basile

== Third-place match ==
14 July 2007
17:05

Uruguay	1–3	Mexico
Abreu 22'	Report	Blanco 36' (pen.); Bravo 68'; Guardado 76'

Estadio Olímpico, Caracas
Attendance: 25,000
Referee: Mauricio Reinoso (Ecuador)

Uruguay	Mexico

GK	1	Fabián Carini
CB	17	Carlos Valdez
CB	2	Diego Lugano (c)	(red card) 36'
CB	19	Andrés Scotti	(yellow card) 31'
DM	5	Pablo García	(yellow card) 57'	(substituted off) 79'
RM	4	Jorge Fucile
LM	20	Nacho González		(substituted off) 74'
AM	21	Diego Forlán	(yellow card) 26'	(substituted off) 74'
RF	16	Maxi Pereira
CF	13	Sebastián Abreu
LF	7	Cristian Rodríguez
Substitutions:
MF	18	Fabián Canobbio		(substituted on) 74'
FW	22	Vicente Sánchez		(substituted on) 74'
MF	8	Walter Gargano		(substituted on) 79'
Manager:
Óscar Tabárez

GK	13	Guillermo Ochoa
RB	21	Nery Castillo	(yellow card) 74'
CB	2	Jonny Magallón
CB	22	Francisco Rodríguez
LB	3	Fausto Pinto	(yellow card) 26'	(substituted off) 64'
DM	6	Gerardo Torrado
RM	10	Cuauhtémoc Blanco (c)
CM	5	Israel Castro
LM	16	Jaime Lozano
SS	11	Ramón Morales
CF	19	Omar Bravo		(substituted off) 88'
Substitutions:
MF	18	Andrés Guardado		(substituted on) 64'
FW	9	Luis Ángel Landín		(substituted on) 88'
Manager:
Hugo Sánchez

== Final ==
15 July 2007
17:05

Brazil	3–0	Argentina
Baptista 4'; Ayala 40' (o.g.); Dani Alves 69'	Report

Estadio José Pachencho Romero, Maracaibo
Attendance: 40,000
Referee: Carlos Amarilla (Paraguay)

Brazil	Argentina

GK	12	Doni	(yellow card) 51'
RB	2	Maicon
CB	3	Alex	(yellow card) 37'
CB	4	Juan (c)
LB	6	Gilberto	(yellow card) 54'
DM	5	Mineiro
DM	17	Josué	(yellow card) 82'
AM	7	Elano		(substituted off) 34'
AM	19	Júlio Baptista	(yellow card) 68'
SS	11	Robinho		(substituted off) 90'
CF	9	Vágner Love		(substituted off) 90'
Substitutions:
DF	13	Dani Alves		(substituted on) 34'
MF	18	Fernando		(substituted on) 90'
MF	10	Diego		(substituted on) 90'
Manager:
Dunga

GK	1	Roberto Abbondanzieri
RB	8	Javier Zanetti
CB	2	Roberto Ayala (c)
CB	15	Gabriel Milito
LB	6	Gabriel Heinze
DM	19	Esteban Cambiasso		(substituted off) 59'
DM	14	Javier Mascherano	(yellow card) 44'
CM	20	Juan Sebastián Verón		(substituted off) 67'
AM	18	Lionel Messi
AM	10	Juan Román Riquelme
CF	11	Carlos Tevez	(yellow card) 75'
Substitutions:
MF	16	Pablo Aimar		(substituted on) 59'
MF	13	Lucho González		(substituted on) 67'
Manager:
Alfio Basile
