= José Nieto =

José Nieto may refer to:

- José Nieto (actor) (1902–1982), Spanish actor
- José Nieto (composer) (born 1942), Spanish composer
- José Nieto (footballer) (1958–2021), Venezuelan footballer
- José Manuel Nieto (1734–1804), Spanish soldier and settler of Spanish California
