= Renny Vega =

Venezuelan footballer (born 1979)

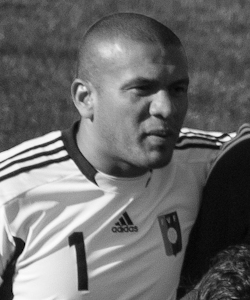
- Vega during a match with Venezuela

Personal information
- Full name: Renny Vicente Vega Hernández
- Date of birth: 4 July 1979 (age 47)
- Place of birth: Maracay, Venezuela
- Height: 1.77 m (5 ft 10 in)
- Position: Goalkeeper

Youth career
- 1997–1998: Udinese
- 1998–1999: Nacional Táchira

Senior career*
Years	Team	Apps	(Gls)
1999–2003	Italchacao	134	(1)
2003–2004	Deportivo Táchira	19	(0)
2004–2005	Caracas	17	(0)
2005–2006	Aragua	21	(0)
2006–2007	Carabobo	29	(0)
2007–2008	Bursaspor	25	(0)
2008	Denizlispor	4	(0)
2009–2013	Caracas	116	(0)
2012	→ Colo-Colo (loan)	15	(0)
2013–2015	Deportivo La Guaira	57	(0)
2015–2016	União da Madeira	2	(0)
2016	Deportivo Anzoátegui	32	(0)
2017	Zulia	16	(0)

International career
1999	Venezuela U20	4	(0)
1999–2013	Venezuela	66	(0)
- * Club domestic league appearances and goals

Renny Vicente Vega Hernández (Spanish pronunciation: [ˈreni ˈβeɣa eɾˈnandeθ], born 4 July 1979) is a Venezuelan former professional footballer who played as a goalkeeper.

He played with the Venezuela national team for more than ten years, with his most successful moment being when he was a member of the historic 2011 Copa América squad that reached 4th place. His performances as goalkeeper under the leadership of coach Richard Páez, and later César Farías, for the national team made him an important player in Venezuelan football's emergent recent history.

== Club career ==
=== Venezuela and Europe ===
In 1997, Vega traveled to Italy to play in the youth ranks of Udinese. However, he returned to Venezuela in 1998, joining Nacional Táchira, a first division club of his country. After two years with Nacional, Vega returned to Udinese remaining at the club for one year. He then returned to Venezuela and played for various First Division clubs, including Caracas.

In 2006, he was signed by Carabobo, playing 29 games in the club. In 2007, because of his good performances with the national team and his club, he was transferred to Turkish club Bursaspor, being this his second adventure in the old continent. He established himself as the Turkish club's top keeper and appeared in 22 league matches. After his spell at Bursaspor, he joined to Denizlispor, playing only one friendly game for the club.

In January 2009, after his bad spell at Denizlispor, Vega returned to Venezuela, joining Caracas, the most successful team in his country. With Caracas he played both the Copa Libertadores and the local tournament. He had a successful semester at Caracas, winning the Venezuelan league title and also the cup title. In 2010, his team again qualified for the Copa Libertadores but had a poor Cup run, finishing last place in the group with 2 points. Although, since Caracas won the league title again, his team once again qualified to the continental tournament in 2011.

=== Colo-Colo ===
On 13 February 2012, was reported that Primera División club Colo-Colo and Caracas reached an agreement in a US$100.000 fee for Vega on a long-season deal, being appointed on 16 January during a press conference at Estadio Monumental. However, because first-choice Francisco Prieto's well performances, Vega failed to play during championship first weeks, but following the resignation of Ivo Basay (team's coach) and 5–0 thrash of rivals Universidad de Chile (where Prieto conceded those goals), he finally made his debut on 5 May against Unión San Felipe in a 1–0 home win. After five-match unbeaten with him in goal and caretaker coach Luis Pérez since one-nil over San Felipe (between Torneo Apertura's regular phase and playoffs), on 24 June, he conceded four goals in rematch semifinal against Universidad de Chile, after having won 2–0 in first leg at Macul, where Vega made a well game.

== International career ==
In 1998, Vega was named the best keeper of the Primera División youth ranks and one year later was listed in the Copa América 22–man squad of Venezuela national team by the Argentine coach José Omar Pastoriza. He made his international debut on 30 July 1999 against Brazil, in where his team lost 7–0, in a match that Ronaldinho realized a very well goal, who made an incredible dribbling that passed over the head of the centre back José Manuel Rey. Three seasons later, Renny was called–up by Richard Páez to the 2001 Copa América held in Colombia, not making an international appearance. In June 2007, was considered by Páez in an historic Copa América for his country, that was made at Venezuela.

Vega made his qualifiers debut in a 1–0 away win over Ecuador at Estadio Olímpico Atahualpa in Quito, his most successful and significant career match, then lost then against the Argentina national football team in the Estadio José Pachencho Romero with goals of the footballers of Barcelona, the centre back Gabriel Milito and the striker Lionel Messi, missing the following qualifier games against Bolivia and Colombia, in where was replaced by the keeper Leonardo Morales, returning in a 1–1 away draw with Uruguay at the Estadio Centenario of the capital Montevideo, in where received a header goal of Diego Lugano. On 12 October 2008, Vega made his most poor performance in the qualifiers against Brazil conceding four goals in a 4–0 home win at the Estadio Polideportivo, receiving the same number of goals in March of the next year against Argentina at Buenos Aires.

Prior to the 2011 Copa América held in Argentina, Renny played two of the three friendly matches leading up to the tournament. The first game was a 2–0 win over Guatemala and in the second match against Spain, Vega committed two mistakes that led his team to a 3–0 loss.

Vega played the full 90 minutes in the opening match of the Group B against Brazil. In an "impressive" performance he stopped a series of goal attempts from stars like Neymar and Alexandre Pato with the game ending in a 0–0 draw. After of the game, Vega said: "The big teams aren’t going to get an easy ride — they’ll have to scrap for everything in every game".

On 13 July 2011, in the last game of the group stage against Paraguay, Venezuela advance to the knockout stage for second time in its history, after drawing 3–3 in dramatic fashion. The game was being lost 3–1 in the 85th minute, but thanks to a goal from Miku in the 89th minute, the team looking for the equalizer in the 93rd minute, in which Vega went up for a corner and headed the ball assisting centre back Grenddy Perozo in scoring the equalizing goal.

== Career statistics ==
=== Club ===
Appearances and goals by club, season and competition
Club	Season	League		Cup		International		Total	
Club	Season	Apps	Goals	Apps	Goals	Apps	Goals	Apps	Goals
Carabobo	2006–07	29	0	–		–		29	0
Bursaspor	2007–08	22	0	0	0	–		22	0
Denizlispor	2008–09	1	0	0	0	–		1	0
Caracas	2008–09	8	0	–		9	0	17	0
Caracas	2009–10	27	0	13	0	5	0	46	0
Caracas	2010–11	31	0	1	0	6	0	38	0
Caracas	2011–12	14	0	–		2	0	16	0
Caracas	Total	80	0	14	0	22	0	116	0
Colo-Colo	2012	13	0	2	0	–		15	0
Career total		145	0	16	0	22	0	183	0

=== International ===
Appearances and goals by national team and year
National team	Year	Apps	Goals
Venezuela	1999	5	0
Venezuela	2001	4	0
Venezuela	2006	7	0
Venezuela	2007	12	0
Venezuela	2008	9	0
Venezuela	2009	9	0
Venezuela	2010	1	0
Venezuela	2011	12	0
Venezuela	2012	6	0
Total		65	0

== Honours ==
Caracas

- Venezuelan Primera División: 2008–09, 2009–10
- Torneo de Clausura: 2009, 2010
- Copa Venezuela: 2009

individual

- Copa América Team of the Tournament: 2011
