= Leao Butrón =

Peruvian footballer (born 1977)

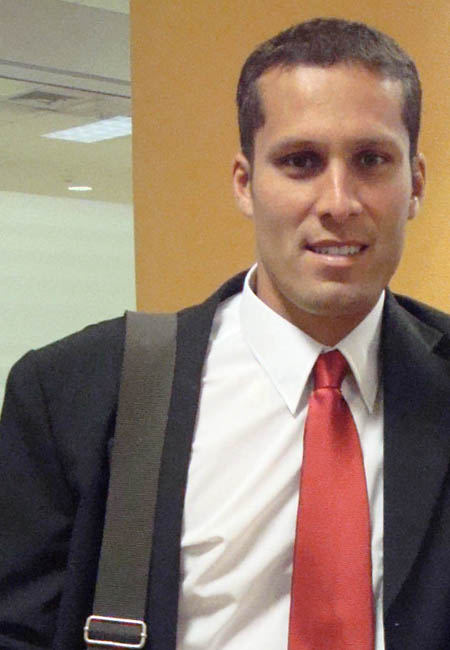
- Butrón in 2007

Personal information
- Full name: Leao Butrón Gotuzzo
- Date of birth: 6 March 1977 (age 49)
- Place of birth: Miraflores, Peru
- Height: 1.84 m (6 ft 0 in)
- Position: Goalkeeper

Senior career*
Years	Team	Apps	(Gls)
1995–2001	Sporting Cristal	75	(0)
2002–2003	Alianza Atlético	77	(0)
2003–2005	Alianza Lima	81	(0)
2006–2012	Universidad San Martín	189	(0)
2013–2014	FBC Melgar	79	(0)
2015–2020	Alianza Lima	113	(0)
Total		643	(0)

International career
2001–2012	Peru	39	(0)
Medal record
Representing Peru
Association football
Copa América
Bronze medal – third place	Argentina 2011
- * Club domestic league appearances and goals

Leao Butrón Gotuzzo (born 6 March 1977 in Miraflores) is a Peruvian former footballer who last played as a goalkeeper in the Torneo Descentralizado for Alianza Lima. He has made more appearances in the Torneo Descentralizado than any other player - with 643 for Alianza Lima, Sporting Cristal, Alianza Atlético, Melgar and University of San Martín de Porres. He also played 39 times for the Peru national team.

== Career ==
On 5 March 2020, the eve of his 43rd birthday, Butrón started for Alianza Lima in a 2020 Copa Libertadores group stage match against Uruguayan side Nacional, which led the EFE news network to wrongly claim that he was the oldest goalkeeper in the competition's history; however, the true holder of this record is Luis Galarza, who had played in 1995 at the age of 44. Later that year, on 21 October, he played his last match in the Copa Libertadores, a 2–0 loss to Nacional, becoming, at the age of 43 years and 7 months, the third oldest player in the history of the Copa Libertadores, only behind José Nieto (43y and 11m in 1999) and Galarza (44 in 1995).

== Honours ==
Sporting Cristal

- Torneo Descentralizado: 1995, 1996

Alianza Lima

- Torneo Descentralizado: 2003, 2004, 2017

Universidad San Martín

- Torneo Descentralizado: 2007, 2008, 2010

Peru

- Copa América: Bronze medal 2011
