= José Nieto (footballer) =

Venezuelan footballer (born 1958)

Personal information
- Full name: José Francisco Nieto Contreras
- Date of birth: 6 November 1958 (age 67)
- Position: Midfielder

Senior career*
| Years | Team | Apps | (Gls) |
| 1972–1973 | Cucuta | | |
| 1973–1974 | Deportes Tolima | | |
| 1974–1977 | Atletico San Cristobal | | |
| 1977–1980 | Cucuta | | |
| 1980–1983 | Deportivo Tachira | | |
| 1983–1984 | Atletico San Cristobal | | |
| 1984–1989 | Deportivo Tachira | | |
| 1989–1991 | Universidad de Los Andes | | |
| 1999 | Deportivo Italchacao | | |

International career
| 1987 | Venezuela | 2 | (0) |
- * Club domestic league appearances and goals

José Francisco Nieto Contreras (6 November 1958 – 10 January 2021) is a Venezuelan footballer who played as a midfielder. He played in two matches for the Venezuela national football team in 1987. He was also part of Venezuela's squad for the 1987 Copa América tournament.

== Club career ==
On 27 October 1999, Nieto started for Deportivo Italchacao in a goalless draw with his former team Deportivo Tachira in the Copa Libertadores, becoming, at the age of 43 years, 11 months, and 21 days, the second oldest player to ever play in the history of the Copa Libertadores, only behind Luis Galarza, who had set the record in 1995, aged 44.

== Death ==
Nieto died on 10 January 2021, at the age of 65, a victim of COVID-19.
