= 2007 Copa América final =

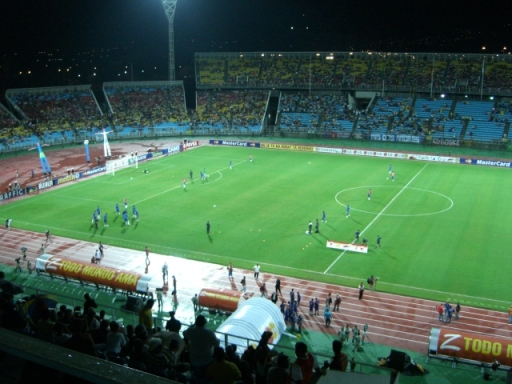
- The Estadio José Pachencho Romero in Maracaibo held the final
- Event: 2007 Copa América
Brazil	Argentina
(Brazil)	(Argentina)
3	0
- Date: 15 July 2007
- Venue: Estadio José Pachencho Romero, Maracaibo
- Referee: Carlos Amarilla (Paraguay)
- Attendance: 40,000
- Weather: Mostly cloudy 32 °C (90 °F)

The 2007 Copa América final was the final match of the 2007 Copa América. It was held on 15 July 2007 in Maracaibo, Venezuela, between Brazil and Argentina. Brazil won 3–0, with goals from Júlio Baptista, a Roberto Ayala own goal and Dani Alves. Brazil won their eighth title, while Argentina could have won their fifteenth.

== Background ==
It was the second consecutive final between Brazil and Argentina; Brazil won the 2004 final on penalties. The match ended 2–2 after extra time: Kily González opened the scoring with a penalty, and Luisão headed an equaliser at the start of the second half. César Delgado put Argentina back into the lead with three minutes of normal time remaining, but Adriano equalised in added time. In the shootout, Brazil's Júlio César saved the first Argentine penalty by Andrés D'Alessandro while Gabriel Heinze missed, and defender Juan scored the winner.

== Route to the final ==
Brazil
Round
Argentina
Opponent
Result
Group stage
Opponent
Result
Mexico
0–2
Match 1
United States
4–1
Chile
3–0
Match 2
Colombia
4–2
Ecuador
1–0
Match 3
Paraguay
1–0

Team	Pld	W	D	L	GF	GA	GD	Pts
Mexico	3	2	1	0	4	1	+3	7
Brazil	3	2	0	1	4	2	+2	6
Chile	3	1	1	1	3	5	−2	4
Ecuador	3	0	0	3	3	6	−3	0

Final standings

Team	Pld	W	D	L	GF	GA	GD	Pts
Argentina	3	3	0	0	9	3	+6	9
Paraguay	3	2	0	1	8	2	+6	6
Colombia	3	1	0	2	3	9	−6	3
United States	3	0	0	3	2	8	−6	0

Opponent
Result
Knockout stage
Opponent
Result
Chile
6–1
Quarter-finals
Peru
4–0
Uruguay
2–2
(5–4 pen.)
Semi-finals
Mexico
3–0

== Match ==
=== Officials ===
Paraguayan Carlos Amarilla was chosen to be the referee, having also refereed the 2004 Final. In the 2007 tournament he refereed two more matches, Uruguay against Peru, and Chile against Mexico, both of the first round.

=== Team selection ===
Of Argentina's team which took part in the 2004 Final, Roberto Abbondanzieri, Javier Zanetti, Gabriel Heinze, Roberto Ayala, Javier Mascherano, and Carlos Tevez started in the 2007 edition, with Lucho González a starter in 2004 and substitute in 2007. For Brazil, Juan and Maicon started both, with Diego a substitute in both.

=== Synopsis ===
Brazil took the lead in the fourth minute through Júlio Baptista, set up by Elano. Thirty minutes later, however, Elano went off injured to be replaced by Dani Alves. Alves sent in a cross in the 40th minute, which Ayala deflected for an own goal past Abbondanzieri to double Brazil's lead at half time.

In the 59th minute, Argentina substituted defensive midfielder Esteban Cambiasso for attacking alternative Pablo Aimar. Ten minutes later, Brazil scored their third and final goal: Vágner Love began a counterattack, running up the pitch and setting up Alves to score.

=== Details ===
15 July 2007
17:05

Brazil	3–0	Argentina
Júlio Baptista 4'; Ayala 40' (o.g.); Dani Alves 69'	Report

Estadio José Pachencho Romero, Maracaibo
Attendance: 40,000
Referee: Carlos Amarilla (Paraguay)

Brazil	Argentina

GK	12	Doni	(yellow card) 51'
RB	2	Maicon
CB	3	Alex	(yellow card) 37'
CB	4	Juan (c)
LB	6	Gilberto	(yellow card) 54'
DM	5	Mineiro
DM	17	Josué	(yellow card) 82'
AM	7	Elano		(substituted off) 34'
AM	19	Júlio Baptista	(yellow card) 68'
SS	11	Robinho		(substituted off) 90'
CF	9	Vágner Love		(substituted off) 90'
Substitutions:
DF	13	Dani Alves		(substituted on) 34'
MF	18	Fernando		(substituted on) 90'
MF	10	Diego		(substituted on) 90'
Manager:
Dunga

GK	1	Roberto Abbondanzieri
RB	8	Javier Zanetti
CB	2	Roberto Ayala (c)
CB	15	Gabriel Milito
LB	6	Gabriel Heinze
DM	19	Esteban Cambiasso		(substituted off) 59'
DM	14	Javier Mascherano	(yellow card) 44'
CM	20	Juan Sebastián Verón		(substituted off) 67'
AM	18	Lionel Messi
AM	10	Juan Román Riquelme
CF	11	Carlos Tevez	(yellow card) 75'
Substitutions:
MF	16	Pablo Aimar		(substituted on) 59'
MF	13	Lucho González		(substituted on) 67'
Manager:
Alfio Basile
