= José Torrealba =

Venezuelan footballer (born 1980)

Personal information
- Full name: José Antonio Torrealba Acevedo
- Date of birth: 13 June 1980 (age 46)
- Place of birth: Acarigua, Venezuela
- Height: 1.74 m (5 ft 8 1/2 in)
- Position: Striker

Senior career*
Years	Team	Apps	(Gls)
1999–2001	Universidad de Los Andes	40	(15)
2001–2002	Estudiantes de Mérida	74	(29)
2002–2003	Deportivo Táchira	25	(13)
2003–2004	Estudiantes de Mérida	37	(19)
2005	UA Maracaibo	19	(11)
2005–2007	Mamelodi Sundowns	50	(15)
2008	Deportivo Táchira	13	(8)
2008–2011	Kaizer Chiefs	35	(4)
2011–2012	Mineros de Guayana	22	(3)
2012	Carabobo	12	(1)
2012–2014	Deportivo Lara	34	(7)
2015	Metropolitanos FC	15	(1)
2016	Trujillanos FC	17	(4)

International career^{‡}
2005–2008	Venezuela	17	(4)
- * Club domestic league appearances and goals as of September 14, 2014 ‡ National team caps and goals as of 23:02, 7 July 2014 (UTC)

José Antonio Torrealba Acevedo (born 13 June 1980 in Acarigua) is a retired Venezuelan footballer who played as a striker.

== Club career ==
Torrealba started his career at Universidad de Los Andes and played for several different local sides. Also, he had two spells in South Africa.

== International career ==
Torrealba has made 17 appearances for the Venezuela national football team. He made his debut in a friendly match against Ecuador on August 17, 2005. He was also a participant at the 2007 Copa America.

Torrealba has played 17 games for the Venezuela national team, scoring four goals.

=== International goals ===
No.	Date	Venue	Opponent	Score	Result	Competition	Ref.
1.	August 17, 2005	Federativo Reina del Cisne, Loja, Ecuador	Ecuador	2–1	3–1	Friendly	
2.	September 3, 2005	José Pachencho Romero, Maracaibo, Venezuela	Peru	3–1	4–1	2006 FIFA World Cup qualification	
3.	September 3, 2005	José Pachencho Romero, Maracaibo, Venezuela	Peru	4–1	4–1	2006 FIFA World Cup qualification	
4.	March 24, 2007	Metropolitano de Mérida, Mérida, Venezuela	Cuba	2–0	3–1	Friendly	
