= Luis Vera (Venezuelan footballer) =

Venezuelan footballer (born 1973)

Personal information
- Full name: Luis Enrique Vera Martineau
- Date of birth: 9 March 1973 (age 53)
- Place of birth: Ciudad Bolívar, Venezuela
- Height: 1.68 m (5 ft 6 in)
- Position: Midfielder

Team information
- Current team: Angostura (assistant)

Senior career*
Years	Team	Apps	(Gls)
1996–1997	Minervén		
1997–1998	Zulia		
1998–2002	Caracas FC		
2002–2003	Monagas		
2003–2010	Caracas FC		
2010–2011	Real Esppor Club		
2011–2012	Tucanes FC		

International career
1996–2007	Venezuela	53	(1)

Managerial career
- 2015: Mineros
- 2016: Angostura
- 2017: Zamora
- 2018–2020: Angostura
- 2021: Bolívar SC
- 2022–: Angostura (assistant)
- * Club domestic league appearances and goals

Luis Enrique Vera Martineau (born 9 March 1973 in Ciudad Bolívar) is a retired Venezuelan football (soccer) midfielder for Caracas FC and Venezuela. He is nicknamed "El Pájaro".

== Club career ==
Vera has played club football for Minervén, Zulia, Caracas FC and Monagas.

== International career ==
He has played over 50 times for Venezuela national team and was a participant at the 2007 Copa America.

=== International goals ===
No.	Date	Venue	Opponent	Score	Result	Competition	Ref.
1.	March 7, 2004	José Pachencho Romero, Maracaibo, Venezuela	Honduras	1–0	2-1	Friendly	
