= Héctor González (Venezuelan footballer) =

Venezuelan footballer (born 1977)

Personal information
- Full name: Héctor Augusto González Guzmán
- Date of birth: November 4, 1977 (age 48)
- Place of birth: Baruta, Venezuela
- Height: 1.77 m (5 ft 9 1/2 in)
- Position: Midfielder

Team information
- Current team: Evagoras Avgorou
- Number: 20

Senior career*
Years	Team	Apps	(Gls)
1997–1999	Mineros de Guayana		
2000	Carabobo		
2000–2002	Caracas FC		
2002–2003	Olimpo de Bahía Blanca	31	(2)
2003–2004	Colón de Santa Fe	32	(0)
2004	Quilmes	6	(0)
2005	Deportivo Cuenca	37	(5)
2006	LDU Quito	13	(0)
2006–2009	AEK Larnaca	59	(8)
2009–2010	Chernomorets Burgas	27	(8)
2010–2011	Alki Larnaca	25	(3)
2011	Ermis Aradippou	13	(3)
2012	Carabobo	15	(3)
2012–2013	Llaneros	32	(8)
2013–2014	Atlético Venezuela	28	(1)
2014–2015	Doxa Katokopias	11	(0)
2015–2016	Alki Oroklini	28	(11)
2016–2017	P.O. Xylotymbou	28	(18)
2017–	ASIL Lysi	5	(0)

International career
2001–2007	Venezuela	53	(4)
- * Club domestic league appearances and goals as of 19 November 2017

Héctor Augusto González Guzmán (Spanish pronunciation: [ˈeɣtoɾ ɣonˈsales]; born November 4, 1977) is a Venezuelan football midfielder who current play for ASIL Lysi. He has played 53 times for the Venezuela national team. His nickname is "El Turbo".

== Career ==
Born in Baruta, Gonzalez played for a number of clubs in Venezuela before moving to Argentine in 2002 where he played for Olimpo de Bahía Blanca, Colón de Santa Fe and Quilmes.

He played very well in Deportivo Cuenca and was well known for his powerful shot. In 2006, he was signed to LDU Quito, which is a soccer team in Ecuador. Liga Deportiva Universitaria decided not extend his contract. Between 2007 and 2009 he played for AEK Larnaca in Cyprus.

On May 14, 2009, 32-year-old Venezuelan midfielder González officially signed for Chernomorets Burgas in an undisclosed fee, his contract is a two-year deal. He made his competitive debut for Chernomorets on 21 May 2009 against Minyor Pernik in round of 24 of the A PFG.

He studied in Valencia, Venezuela in the school named U. E. Colegio Cristo Rey on the north side of the city.

== International career ==
Hector has played 55 times for the national team in Venezuela. In those games he has scored 4 goals.

=== International goals ===
#	Date	Venue	Opponent	Score	Result	Competition
1.	8 November 2001	Pueblo Nuevo, San Cristóbal, Venezuela	Paraguay	3–1	3-1	2002 FIFA World Cup qualification
2.	21 August 2002	Brígido Iriarte, Caracas, Venezuela	Bolivia	2–0	2-0	Friendly
3.	20 August 2003	José Pachencho Romero, Maracaibo, Venezuela	Haiti	3–2	3-2	Friendly
4.	3 March 2004	Centenario, Montevideo, Uruguay	Uruguay	0–2	0-3	2006 FIFA World Cup qualification
Correct as of 7 October 2015
