= Pedro Fernández (Venezuelan footballer) =

Venezuelan footballer (born 1977)

Personal information
- Full name: Pedro Alfonso Fernández Camacho
- Date of birth: 27 July 1977 (age 49)
- Place of birth: Caracas, Venezuela
- Height: 1.75 m (5 ft 9 in)
- Position: Midfielder

Senior career*
Years	Team	Apps	(Gls)
1997–1998	Atlético Zulia		
1998–2001	Nacional Táchira		
2001–2008	UA Maracaibo		
2008–2009	Zulia		
2009–2013	Deportivo Táchira		

International career
2005–2009	Venezuela	12	(0)
- * Club domestic league appearances and goals as of 20 March 2017

Pedro Alfonso Fernández Camacho (born 27 July 1977 in Caracas), known as Pedro Fernández or simply Fernández, is a retired Venezuelan footballer who played as midfielder in the Venezuelan Primera División and for the Venezuela national football team.

== Career statistics ==
=== International ===
Appearances and goals by national team and year
National team	Year	Apps	Goals
Venezuela	2005	1	0
Venezuela	2006	3	0
Venezuela	2007	5	0
Venezuela	2008	1	0
Venezuela	2009	2	0
Total		12	0
