= Sergio Galarza =

Bolivian footballer (born 1975)

Personal information
- Full name: Sergio Daniel Galarza Solíz
- Date of birth: August 25, 1975 (age 51)
- Place of birth: La Paz, Bolivia
- Height: 1.73 m (5 ft 8 in)
- Position: Goalkeeper

Senior career*
Years	Team	Apps	(Gls)
1997–1999	Real Santa Cruz		(0)
2000	Blooming	13	(0)
2001	Bolívar	18	(0)
2002–2005	Wilstermann	113	(0)
2006–2009	Oriente Petrolero	130	(0)
2010	Guabirá	30	(1)
2011–2013	Blooming	93	(0)
2013–2014	Sport Boys Warnes	37	(0)
Total		434	(1)

International career
2000–2013	Bolivia	29	(0)
- * Club domestic league appearances and goals

Sergio Daniel Galarza Solíz (born August 25, 1975, in La Paz) is a Bolivian former footballer, who played as a goalkeeper. He last played for Sport Boys Warnes.

== Club career ==
His former clubs include Real Santa Cruz, Blooming, Bolivar, Wilstermann, Oriente Petrolero and Guabirá. He played professionally from 1997 to 2014.

== International career ==
Galarza also capped for the Bolivia national team 29 times from 2000 to 2013. He was the starting goalkeeper for Bolivia in the first two games during Copa América 2007. He represented his country in 11 FIFA World Cup qualification matches and was a non-playing squad member at the 1999 Confederations Cup.

== Personal life ==
He is the oldest son of football manager and former goalkeeper from the 1970s, 1980s and early 1990s, Luis Galarza, who was the starting goalkeeper for Bolivia national football team during Copa America 1989.
