= Diego Cabrera =

Bolivian football striker (born 1982)

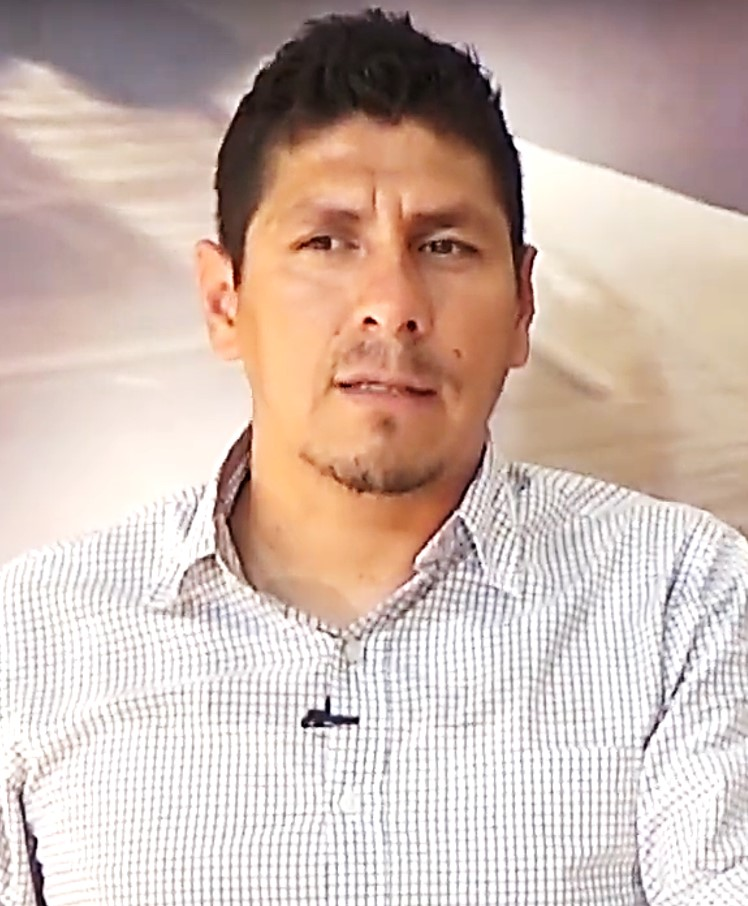

Personal information
- Full name: Diego Aroldo Cabrera Flores
- Date of birth: August 13, 1982 (age 44)
- Place of birth: Santa Cruz de la Sierra, Bolivia
- Height: 1.79 m (5 ft 10 in)
- Position: Striker

Team information
- Current team: Always Ready

Youth career
- 1997–1998: Oriente Petrolero

Senior career*
Years	Team	Apps	(Gls)
1998–1999	Oriente Petrolero		
2000–2002	Blooming	59	(24)
2003–2004	The Strongest	21	(12)
2003	→ Cerro Porteño (loan)	2	(0)
2005	Bolívar	9	(5)
2006	The Strongest	14	(8)
2007	Aurora	20	(14)
2007–2008	Cúcuta Deportivo	39	(19)
2009	→ Independiente Medellín (loan)	13	(4)
2009	→ Oriente Petrolero (loan)	6	(4)
2010	Cúcuta Deportivo	15	(5)
2010	Deportivo Pasto	0	(0)
2011	Aurora	17	(7)
2011	Deportes Tolima	12	(3)
2012	Santa Fe	33	(10)
2013	San José	12	(2)
2013	Itagüí	18	(2)
2013–2014	Guabirá	18	(4)
2014–2015	Universitario de Sucre	3	(1)
2015	Deportivo Capiatá	4	(0)
2016	Royal Pari		
2016–2017	Real Santa Cruz		
2017–	Always Ready		

International career
2001	Bolivia U-20	4	(0)
2005–2013	Bolivia	22	(1)
- * Club domestic league appearances and goals

Diego Aroldo Cabrera Flores (born August 13, 1982, in Santa Cruz de la Sierra) is a Bolivian football striker. He currently plays for Always Ready.

== Club career ==
He played at club level for Oriente Petrolero, Blooming, Bolívar, The Strongest, Aurora, Universitario de Sucre and Guabirá in Bolivia, as well as Cerro Porteño from Paraguay. He also spent a couple of years in the Colombian Professional League with Cúcuta Deportivo, Independiente Medellín, Deportivo Pasto, Deportes Tolima and Itagüí.

In 2007 Cabrera was elected as the "Football Player of the Year" by the Bolivian sports media, thanks to the impressive displays he had while playing for Cúcuta Deportivo.

In 2009, he was loaned to Independiente Medellín. During the first semester Cabrera had great performances in both, the domestic tournament and Copa Libertadores. However, due to some differences with his coach, he decided to leave the club.

In early 2012 Cabrera joined Bogota's Independiente Santa Fe. In July of the year he helped the club win the Apertura Tournament, the first in 34 years for Santa Fe. In January 2013, Cabrera made his return to the Bolivian league after joining San José.

== International career ==
He has earned 22 caps for the Bolivia national team. Cabrera scored his first international goal in a friendly match against Panama on August 20, 2008. He represented his country in 12 FIFA World Cup qualification matches.

Diego Cabrera: International Goals
#	Date	Venue	Opponent	Score	Result	Competition
1.	August 20, 2008	Estadio Tahuichi Aguilera, Santa Cruz de la Sierra, Bolivia	Panama	1–0	1–0	Friendly
