= Darwin Peña =

Bolivian footballer (born 1977)

Personal information
- Full name: Darwin Peña Arce
- Date of birth: August 8, 1977 (age 49)
- Place of birth: Santa Cruz de la Sierra, Bolivia
- Height: 1.69 m (5 ft 7 in)
- Position: Midfielder

Team information
- Current team: Nacional Potosí
- Number: 10

Youth career
- Tahuichi Academy

Senior career*
Years	Team	Apps	(Gls)
1995–1998	Bolívar	85	(5)
1999	→ Real Potosí (loan)	27	(13)
2000	Bolívar	9	(2)
2001–2003	Real Potosí	97	(30)
2004	Oriente Petrolero	30	(3)
2005	Blooming	5	(1)
2006–2007	Real Potosí	55	(16)
2008	San José	30	(11)
2009	Real Potosí	32	(5)
2010	The Strongest	32	(4)
2011–2012	Aurora	30	(3)
2012–2013	Blooming	24	(2)
2013–2015	Real Potosí	69	(15)
2015–	Nacional Potosí	28	(6)

International career^{‡}
2001–2008	Bolivia	12	(1)
- * Club domestic league appearances and goals as of March 21, 2013 ‡ National team caps and goals as of October 7, 2010

Darwin Peña Arce (born August 8, 1977, in Santa Cruz de la Sierra) is a Bolivian football midfielder who currently plays for Nacional Potosí in the Liga de Fútbol Profesional Boliviano.

== Club career ==
His former clubs include San José, Bolívar, Oriente Petrolero, Blooming, The Strongest, Real Potosí and Aurora.

== International career ==
Peña has been capped for the Bolivia national team in 12 games between 2001 and 2008 with only one goal scored. He was part of the national team during the 2007 Copa América. He represented his country in 3 FIFA World Cup qualification matches.

== Honours ==
=== Club ===
- Bolívar (2)
  - Liga de Fútbol Profesional Boliviano: 1996, 1997
- Oriente Petrolero (1)
  - Liga de Fútbol Profesional Boliviano: 2004 (C)
- Blooming (1)
  - Liga de Fútbol Profesional Boliviano: 2005 (A)
- Real Potosí (1)
  - Liga de Fútbol Profesional Boliviano: 2007 (A)
