= Joel Zayas =

Paraguayan footballer (born 1977)

Personal information
- Full name: Joel Fernando Zayas Cabrera
- Date of birth: 17 September 1977 (age 49)
- Place of birth: Asunción, Paraguay
- Height: 1.86 m (6 ft 1 in)
- Position: Goalkeeper

Senior career*
Years	Team	Apps	(Gls)
1998–2003	Cerro Porteño	19	(0)
2004–2005	Club Sport Colombia	30	(0)
2005	Sp. Luqueño	0	(0)
2006–2007	Bolívar	59	(0)
2007–2008	Guaraní	19	(0)
2009	Wilstermann	9	(0)
2010	CNI	5	(0)
2010	San José	9	(0)
2011–2012	3 de Febrero	23	(0)

International career
2007	Paraguay	1	(0)
- * Club domestic league appearances and goals

Joel Fernando Zayas (born 17 September 1977 in Asunción) is a Paraguayan former football goalkeeper.

In June 2007, after great performances with his club Bolívar, he was selected for the Paraguay national football team that participated in the 2007 Copa America. In the quarterfinals of the competition, Paraguay played against Mexico. In the 2nd minute, goalkeeper Aldo Bobadilla was sent off after a bad challenge over Nery Castillo and after Justo Villar had been injured earlier in the tournament, giving Zayas the chance to play in the rest of the match and his first cap. Paraguay ended playing the game with ten players, and they eventually lost 6–0, thus ending the Copa America campaign.

After the Copa America tournament, Zayas was transferred to Guaraní. In 2009, he returned to Bolivia, only this time, he signed with Club Jorge Wilstermann.
