= Jhoel Herrera =

Peruvian footballer (born 1980)

Personal information
- Full name: Jhoel Alexander Herrera Zegarra
- Date of birth: 9 July 1980 (age 46)
- Place of birth: Pisco, Peru
- Height: 1.77 m (5 ft 10 in)
- Position: Right-back

Senior career*
Years	Team	Apps	(Gls)
2000	Hijos de Yurimaguas		(8)
2001	Sporting Cristal	4	(0)
2002–2003	Coronel Bolognesi	39	(2)
2004–2005	Unión Huaral	43	(1)
2005–2006	Universitario de Deportes	39	(2)
2007	Alianza Lima	11	(0)
2007–2009	GKS Bełchatów	5	(0)
2008	→ Alianza Lima (loan)	13	(0)
2009	Cienciano	30	(0)
2010	Total Chalaco	34	(1)
2011	Juan Aurich	9	(0)
2012–2017	Real Garcilaso	183	(6)
2018	Juan Aurich	25	(0)
2019	Real Garcilaso	4	(0)
2020	Unión Huaral	5	(0)

International career
2007–2013	Peru	10	(0)
- * Club domestic league appearances and goals

Jhoel Alexander Herrera Zegarra (born 9 July 1980) is a Peruvian former professional footballer who played as a right-back.

== Club career ==
He has played for GKS Bełchatów in Poland, and Universitario de Deportes and Alianza Lima in Peru. Herrera played for Juan Aurich during the 2011 Torneo Descentralizado season.

In March 2020, Herrera returned to Unión Huaral who was playing in the Peruvian Segunda División. In February 2021, 39-year old Herrera announced his retirement from football.

== Honours ==
Juan Aurich

- Peruvian First Division: 2011
