= Sacha Lima =

Bolivian footballer (born 1981)

Personal information
- Full name: Sacha Silvestre Lima Castedo
- Date of birth: 17 August 1981 (age 45)
- Place of birth: Santa Ana del Yacuma, Bolivia
- Height: 1.77 m (5 ft 10 in)
- Position: Midfielder

Senior career*
Years	Team	Apps	(Gls)
2000–2007	Wilstermann	176	(11)
2005	→ Real Potosí (loan)	21	(0)
2008	The Strongest	28	(2)
2009–2010	Universitario	58	(4)
2011–2013	The Strongest	50	(5)

International career
2001	Bolivia U-20	4	(0)
2006–2010	Bolivia	11	(0)
- * Club domestic league appearances and goals

Sacha Silvestre Lima Castedo (born 17 August 1981 in Santa Ana del Yacuma) is a retired Bolivian football midfielder.

== Club career ==
In 2000, Lima began playing professionally for Club Jorge Wilstermann. That year he helped the team win the national championship. In 2004, he was loaned to Real Potosí, but returned to Wilstermann the following year. During 2006, he was part of squad which crowned themselves as champions of the "segundo torneo". In 2008, he signed with The Strongest, but played there for one season since the board and the new manager agreed to rebuild the franchise and releasing nearly the entire roster, Lima included. In 2009, he joined Universitario de Sucre, team for which he also played in Copa Libertadores. From 2011 will be player in The Strongest.

== International career ==
Since 2004, Lima has been called up to the Bolivia national team in 11 occasions. He was a member of the Bolivian squad during the Copa America 2007. He represented his country in 2 FIFA World Cup qualification matches.

== Honours ==
=== Club ===
- Wilstermann
  - Liga de Fútbol Profesional Boliviano: 2000, 2006 (ST)
