= Gualberto Mojica =

Bolivian former footballer and a manager (born 1984)

Personal information
- Full name: Gualberto Mojica Olmos
- Date of birth: 7 October 1984 (age 42)
- Place of birth: Santa Cruz de la Sierra, Bolivia
- Height: 1.77 m (5 ft 10 in)
- Position: Attacking midfielder

Youth career
- 1993–2001: Tahuichi Academy

Senior career*
Years	Team	Apps	(Gls)
2001–2003	Jorge Wilstermann	75	(10)
2004–2006	Blooming	101	(31)
2006–2007	CFR Cluj	11	(0)
2007	Paços Ferreira	4	(0)
2008–2010	Blooming	63	(9)
2009	→ Oriente Petrolero (loan)	27	(3)
2011–2013	Oriente Petrolero	52	(24)
2013	Petrolul Ploiești	13	(2)
2013	Chongqing Lifan	10	(1)
2014–2015	Oriente Petrolero	57	(16)
2015–2016	Hajer Club	7	(0)
2016–2017	Oriente Petrolero	31	(2)
2017–2019	Guabirá	79	(17)
2021–2022	Oriente Petrolero	15	(1)
Total		544	(116)

International career
2004	Bolivia U23	4	(2)
2003–2014	Bolivia	31	(3)

Managerial career
- 2023: Leones del Torno
- 2023–2024: Guabirá (assistant)
- 2023: Guabirá (interim)
- 2023: Guabirá (interim)
- 2024: Guabirá
- 2025: Oriente Petrolero (assistant)
- 2025: Oriente Petrolero (interim)
- 2025: Oriente Petrolero
- * Club domestic league appearances and goals

Gualberto Mojica Olmos (Spanish pronunciation: [ɡwalˈβeɾto moˈxika], born 7 October 1984) is a Bolivian football manager and former player who played as an attacking midfielder.

== Club career ==
Mojica was one of the most promising prospects of the largely awarded Tahuichi Academy's class of '84. After an impressive performance in the Gothia Cup, winning the title with Tahuichi in 2001, he awoke the interest of Wilstermann, club for which he later signed in May 2001. After two years playing in Cochabamba, he was transferred to Blooming where his career took off.

At Blooming he soon became the team captain and one of the most notable players in the Bolivian League. In 2005, Mojica had a remarkable season; his great performances helped the team win its fourth national championship.

Following his successful spell with Blooming, he transferred to Romanian club CFR Cluj before moving to Portuguese side F.C. Paços de Ferreira not long after. From the beginning he struggled to gain a consistent first-team place, making only 15 league appearances combined during his European journey.

After a disappointing season overseas, he returned to Bolivia in January 2008, and again, signed with Blooming for a year. When the contract expired, Mojica demanded a considerable raise of salary and the club decided to dispense with his services. Thus, Mojica signed with local rival team Oriente Petrolero in January 2009. After a year with Oriente, Mojica returned to Blooming for his third stint.

In February 2013, Mojica returned to Romania, where he signed a contract for one-and-a-half-year with Petrolul Ploiești. On 4 July 2013, he moved to China and signed a contract with China League One side Chongqing Lifan.

Mojica subsequently had another three spells at Oriente Petrolero, where he retired at the age of 38 in 2022.

== International career ==
Mojica was the captain of the Bolivian Under-23 national team. In addition, he has been capped for the senior Bolivia national team on 31 occasions. He represented his country in 10 FIFA World Cup qualification matches.

== Managerial career ==
Mojica began his managerial career in 2023, in charge of Leones del Torno, before joining Guabirá as an assistant. On 2 August 2024, after two spells as an interim, he was named manager of the latter club.

Mojica resigned from Guabirá on 27 October 2024, and joined Oriente Petrolero ahead of the 2025 season. Initially an assistant, he was named interim manager on 14 April, before being confirmed as a permanent manager eight days later.

On 11 August 2025, Mojica was sacked from Oriente.

== Honours ==
Blooming

- Primera División (1): 2005
- Copa Aerosur (2): 2006, 2008

Petrolul Ploiesti

- Cupa României (1): 2012–13
