= Leonel Reyes =

Bolivian footballer (born 1976)

Personal information
- Full name: Leonel Alfredo Reyes Saravia
- Date of birth: November 19, 1976 (age 49)
- Place of birth: La Paz, Bolivia
- Height: 1.76 m (5 ft 9 1/2 in)
- Position: Midfielder

Senior career*
Years	Team	Apps	(Gls)
2000–2003	Iberoamericana	111	(6)
2004–2010	Bolívar	165	(3)
2011–2012	The Strongest	38	(0)

International career^{‡}
2003–2009	Bolivia	22	(2)
- * Club domestic league appearances and goals as of October 23, 2009 ‡ National team caps and goals as of October 14, 2009

Leonel Alfredo Reyes Saravia (born November 19, 1976) is a Bolivian former footballer who played as a midfielder.

== Club career ==
Reyes last played for The Strongest in the Liga de Fútbol Profesional Boliviano.

He played in the finals of the Copa Sudamericana 2004, a game in which he received a yellow card.

== International career ==
Reyes was also a member of the Bolivia national team competing at the Copa América 2007. He has earned a total of 22 caps, scoring 2 goals and represented his country in 10 FIFA World Cup qualification matches.
