= Edder Pérez =

Venezuelan footballer (born 1983)

Personal information
- Full name: Edder Alfonso Pérez Consuegra
- Date of birth: July 3, 1983 (age 43)
- Place of birth: San Felipe, Venezuela
- Height: 1.74 m (5 ft 9 in)
- Position: Defender

Senior career*
Years	Team	Apps	(Gls)
2001–2011	Caracas FC	44	(3)
2007–2008	→ Marítimo (loan)	3	(0)
2011	Yaracuyanos	3	(0)
2012–2014	Portuguesa	1	(0)

International career
2007–2009	Venezuela	7	(0)
- * Club domestic league appearances and goals

Edder Alfonso Pérez Consuegra (born 3 July 1983) is a football player from San Felipe, Venezuela who plays as a defender.

== Club career ==
Pérez is a versatile player, able to play in any position on the left flank as well as a center midfielder. Started his career at Caracas FC where he quickly made the defence his home and was a fan favourite at the club following his impressive performances in Copa Libertadores, specially against Brazilian outfit Santos. After only one season at the club he joined BWINLIGA club CS Maritimo on loan from Caracas, who did not want to sell the talisman of the squad so they loaned him out to the club with Maritimo having the option of signing him.

== International career ==
The full back, Venezuelan international, was selected as part of Venezuela's squad for the 2007 Copa América tournament, which was held in his home country.

Pérez played a major role in the attack in his first game in the 2007 Copa América as his country ran out 2–0 winners against Peru.
