= Fernando de Ornelas =

Venezuelan footballer (born 1976)

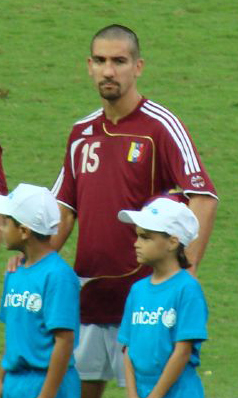
- De Ornelas lining up for Venezuela at the 2007 Copa América

Personal information
- Full name: Fernando Franco de Ornelas
- Date of birth: 29 July 1976 (age 50)
- Place of birth: Caracas, Venezuela
- Height: 6 ft 1 in (1.85 m)
- Position: Midfielder

Youth career
- 1993–1996: Marítimo Caracas

Senior career*
Years	Team	Apps	(Gls)
1996–1997	UA Tachira		
1997–1998	Marítimo Caracas		
1998–1999	South China	35	(20)
1999	Crystal Palace	9	(0)
2000	Celtic	2	(0)
2001	South China	4	(1)
2001	Queens Park Rangers	2	(0)
2002	Marítimo	4	(0)
2003	Gansu Tianma	4	(0)
2003	FC Nürnberg	4	(0)
2004–2005	Olympiakos Nicosia	21	(3)
2005–2008	Odd Grenland	57	(11)
2008	Monagas	10	(1)
2009	Zulia	7	(0)
2009–2010	Mjøndalen	3	(0)
Total		129	(36)

International career^{‡}
1999–2007	Venezuela	27	(5)
- * Club domestic league appearances and goals as of 11 December 2009 ‡ National team caps and goals as of 15 April 2009

Fernando Franco de Ornelas (born 29 July 1976 in Caracas), is a retired Venezuelan football player.

== Club career ==
De Ornelas has played for clubs in several countries in his career, such as Norwegian Odd Grenland and Hong Kong First Division League giant South China. He has had short spells with Crystal Palace, Celtic, Queens Park Rangers, Olympiakos Nicosia, and played for two teams called Marítimo; CS Marítimo of Portugal and Marítimo Caracas.

== Retirement ==
After finishing his career as a footballer, de Ornelas settled in Bamble Municipality, Norway. He currently works as a Pentecostal pastor in a Norwegian free church.

== International goals ==
No.	Date	Venue	Opponent	Score	Result	Competition	Ref.
1.	20 June 1999	Misael Delgado, Valencia, Venezuela	Peru	3–0	3–0	Friendly	
2.	10 August 2000	Alejandro Morera Soto, Alajuela, Costa Rica	Costa Rica	1–4	1–5	Friendly	
3.	6 September 2006	St. Jakob-Park, Basel, Switzerland	Austria	0–1	0–1	Friendly	
4.	28 March 2007	José Pachencho Romero, Maracaibo, Venezuela	New Zealand	2–0	5–0	Friendly	
5.	28 March 2007	José Pachencho Romero, Maracaibo, Venezuela	New Zealand	3–0	5–0	Friendly	
