= Jorge Ortiz (Bolivian footballer) =

Bolivian footballer (born 1984)

Personal information
- Full name: Jorge Antonio Ortiz Ortiz
- Date of birth: 1 June 1984 (age 42)
- Place of birth: Concepción, Bolivia
- Height: 1.73 m (5 ft 8 in)
- Position: Defender

Team information
- Current team: Oriente Petrolero (reserves manager)

Senior career*
Years	Team	Apps	(Gls)
2003–2007	Blooming	133	(3)
2008	→ Bolívar (loan)	26	(1)
2009–2010	→ The Strongest (loan)	45	(1)
2011–2014	Blooming	112	(3)
2014–2016	Oriente Petrolero	52	(1)
2016–2021	Wilstermann	147	(9)
2022–2023	Real Santa Cruz	43	(0)

International career
2007	Bolivia	2	(0)

Managerial career
- 2025–: Oriente Petrolero (reserves)
- 2026: Oriente Petrolero (interim)
- * Club domestic league appearances and goals

Jorge Antonio Ortiz Ortiz (born 1 June 1984, in Concepción) is a Bolivian football manager and former player who played as a defender. He is the current manager of Oriente Petrolero's reserve team.
