= Luis Galarza =

Bolivian footballer (1950–2024)

Personal information
- Full name: Luis Esteban Galarza Mayeregger
- Date of birth: 26 December 1950
- Place of birth: Asunción, Paraguay
- Date of death: 27 July 2024 (aged 73)
- Place of death: Santa Cruz de la Sierra, Bolivia
- Position: Goalkeeper

Senior career*
Years	Team	Apps	(Gls)
1971–1987	The Strongest		
1987–1988	Always Ready		
1989–1990	Bolívar		
1991	San José		
1992–1993	Jorge Wilstermann		
1994	Independiente Petrolero		
1995	Jorge Wilstermann		
1995–1996	Blooming		

International career
1977–1989	Bolivia	17	(0)

Managerial career
- 1997: The Strongest
- 1998–2000: Real Potosí
- 2001: Bolívar
- 2001–2003: Real Potosí
- 2003–2004: The Strongest
- 2004: Blooming
- 2005: Oriente Petrolero
- 2006–2007: Aurora
- 2009: Jorge Wilstermann
- ?–2024: Always Ready (goalkeeping coach)
- * Club domestic league appearances and goals

Luis Esteban Galarza Mayeregger (26 December 1950 – 27 July 2024) was a Bolivian football coach and player who played as a goalkeeper.

== Career ==
=== Club career ===
On 17 March 1995, Galarza started for Jorge Wilstermann in a 1995 Copa Libertadores group stage match against Peruvian side Sporting Cristal, which ended in a resounding 7–0 loss. In doing so, at the age of 44 years, 2 months, and 19 days, he became the second oldest player to ever play in the history of the Copa Libertadores, a record that he still holds.

=== International career ===
Born in Paraguay, Galarza played in 17 matches for the Bolivia national team from 1977 to 1989. He was also part of Bolivia's squad for the 1987 Copa América tournament.

=== Legacy ===
His sons Sergio and Luis Eduardo were also footballers and goalkeepers, his older half-brother, Ramón Mayeregger, played for Paraguay at the 1958 FIFA World Cup, and another brother, Arturo Galarza, also played for the Bolivian national team. Luis Galarza died in Santa Cruz de la Sierra on 27 July 2024, at the age of 73.
