= Paolo de la Haza =

Peruvian footballer (born 1983)

Personal information
- Full name: Paolo Giancarlo de la Haza Urquiza
- Date of birth: November 30, 1983 (age 42)
- Place of birth: Lima, Peru
- Height: 1.78 m (5 ft 10 in)
- Positions: Right-back; midfielder

Senior career*
Years	Team	Apps	(Gls)
2002–2004	Sport Boys	73	(3)
2005–2007	Cienciano	125	(7)
2007–2009	Chornomorets Odesa	28	(2)
2009–2011	Alianza Lima	34	(2)
2009–2010	→ Beitar Jerusalem (loan)	26	(0)
2011	Jiangsu Sainty	21	(1)
2012–2013	Universidad César Vallejo	77	(3)
2014–2016	Sporting Cristal	53	(0)
2016–2017	Juan Aurich	34	(1)
2017	Alianza Lima	23	(0)
2018	Cienciano	25	(1)
2019-2020	Sport Boys	30	(1)
2021–2022	Atlético Grau	23	(0)
2023	Deportivo Llacuabamba	20	(0)

International career
2003–2010	Peru	24	(0)
- * Club domestic league appearances and goals

Paolo Giancarlo de la Haza Urquiza (born November 30, 1983) is a Peruvian former professional footballer who played as a right-back or midfielder. He was a member of Peru national team at the 2007 Copa America.

== Club career ==
De la Hazawas born in Lima, Peru. On July 23, 2007 he signed a three-year agreement with the Ukrainian side. In February 2009 he returned to Peru to play for Alianza Lima. He transferred to China Super League club Jiangsu Sainty in March 2011.

== International career ==
De la Haza made 24 appearances for the Peru national team.
