= Juan Carlos Mariño =

Peruvian footballer (born 1982)

Personal information
- Full name: Juan Carlos Mariño Márquez
- Date of birth: 2 January 1982 (age 44)
- Place of birth: Lima, Peru
- Height: 1.73 m (5 ft 8 in)
- Position: Attacking midfielder

Team information
- Current team: Llacuabamba (reserves manager)

Youth career
- Cantolao
- 1999–2000: Lanús

Senior career*
Years	Team	Apps	(Gls)
2001–2006	Lanús	14	(1)
2003–2004	→ Argentinos Juniors (loan)	21	(0)
2005	→ Dinamo Tirana (loan)	0	(0)
2006–2007	Cienciano	42	(9)
2007	Alianza Lima	4	(1)
2007–2008	Hércules Alicante	28	(2)
2008–2009	Cádiz	0	(0)
2008–2009	→ Cienciano (loan)	11	(2)
2009	Atlético Nacional	4	(0)
2009	Deportivo Cali	10	(1)
2010	Sport Boys	18	(1)
2010–2011	Cienciano	29	(7)
2012	Sporting Cristal	18	(8)
2013	Queretaro	7	(0)
2013	Delfines	1	(0)
2014	Juan Aurich	31	(3)
2015	León de Huánuco	14	(0)
2016	Real Garcilaso	12	(2)
2017	Cantolao	5	(0)
Total		269	(37)

International career
2006–2013	Peru	23	(3)

Managerial career
- 2018–2019: Cantolao (reserves manager)
- 2018–2019: Cantolao (assistant)
- 2018: Cantolao (joint-manager)
- 2020–: Llacuabamba (reserves manager)
- * Club domestic league appearances and goals

Juan Carlos Mariño Márquez (born 2 January 1982) is a Peruvian former professional footballer who played as an attacking midfielder. He is head coach of Deportivo Llacuabamba's reserve team.

== International career ==
Mariño made 22 appearances for the Peru national team.

He made his debut as a substitute during his first Peru cap in the opening match vs Uruguay in the first round of the Copa America 2007, scoring a goal. Mariño scored his second international goal against Colombia on 14 June 2008. He also played for Hércules in Spain.

== Coaching career ==
On 21 January 2018, Mariño was appointed head coach of Cantolao's reserve team and technical assistant for the first team. On 28 October 2018, he was promoted to joint-head coach for the club's first team alongside Jorge Araujo for the rest of 2018. However, the duo was only in charge for six games before the club confirmed, that Araujo would continue as the club's head coach, while Mariño would keep going with the reserve team.

In January 2020, he moved to Deportivo Llacuabamba as head coach of the club's reserve team.

== Career statistics ==
Mariño – goals for Peru
#	Date	Venue	Opponent	Score	Result	Competition
1.	26 June 2007	Mérida, Venezuela	Uruguay	3–0	Win	2007 Copa América
2.	14 June 2008	Lima, Peru	Colombia	1–1	Draw	2010 FIFA World Cup qualification
3.	12 October 2012	La Paz, Bolivia	Bolivia	1–1	Draw	2014 World Cup qualification

== Honours ==
Sporting Cristal

- Torneo Descentralizado: 2012
