= Miguel Villalta =

Peruvian footballer (born 1981)

Personal information
- Full name: Miguel Ángel Villalta Hurtado
- Date of birth: June 16, 1981 (age 45)
- Place of birth: Cusco, Peru
- Height: 1.87 m (6 ft 2 in)
- Position: Center back

Youth career
- 1997–1999: Cienciano

Senior career*
Years	Team	Apps	(Gls)
1999–2000	Cienciano	12	(1)
2001	Sporting Cristal	2	(0)
2001	Juan Aurich	18	(2)
2002–2005	Sporting Cristal	120	(10)
2006	Cienciano	34	(2)
2007–2010	Sporting Cristal	113	(8)
2011	Melgar	20	(1)
2012	Cienciano	16	(1)
2013	José Gálvez	9	(0)
2014	Atletico Minero	7	(0)

International career
2003–2008	Peru	28	(2)
- * Club domestic league appearances and goals as of 21 February 2013

Miguel Ángel Villalta Hurtado (born June 16, 1981) was a Peruvian footballer who played as a center back.

== Club career ==
After playing in several district teams, Miguel Villalta played for Cienciano's youth team in 1997, playing as a midfielder. In 1999, Villalta debuted with Cienciano's first team, when Cienciano's current coach, Franco Navarro, put him in as a defender in a match against Unión Minas.

In 2007, he suffered burns on the soles of his feet after playing on artificial turf or artificial pitch in blazing sun.

== International career ==
Villalta has made 28 appearances for the Peru national football team.
