= Nacho González (footballer, born 1982) =

Uruguayan footballer (born 1982)

Personal information
- Full name: Ignacio María González Gatti
- Date of birth: 14 May 1982 (age 44)
- Place of birth: Montevideo, Uruguay
- Height: 1.78 m (5 ft 10 in)
- Position: Midfielder

Team information
- Current team: Uruguay U17 (manager)

Youth career
- Danubio

Senior career*
Years	Team	Apps	(Gls)
2002–2008	Danubio	156	(46)
2008	→ Monaco (loan)	5	(1)
2008–2011	Valencia	0	(0)
2008–2009	→ Newcastle United (loan)	2	(0)
2010	→ Levadiakos (loan)	13	(2)
2010	→ Levante (loan)	3	(0)
2011–2013	Standard Liège	31	(8)
2013	→ Hércules (loan)	12	(1)
2013–2016	Nacional	49	(9)
2016–2021	Montevideo Wanderers	105	(21)
2021–2022	Danubio	38	(3)

International career
2006–2010	Uruguay	18	(1)

Managerial career
- 2023–2024: Uruguay U13
- 2024–2025: Uruguay U15
- 2025: Uruguay U16
- 2026–: Uruguay U17
- * Club domestic league appearances and goals

Ignacio 'Nacho' María González Gatti (Spanish pronunciation: [iɣˈnasjo ˈnatʃo maˈɾi.a ɣonˈsales]; born 14 May 1982) is a Uruguayan professional football manager and former player who played as a midfielder. He is currently the manager of the Uruguay national under-17 team.

== Club career ==
Born in Montevideo, González's professional career began at Danubio FC, where he appeared in a total of 170 games whilst scoring more than 50 official goals for the capital-based club. During his spell, he won the Primera División title twice, in 2004 and 2007.

After his performances for Danubio, González eventually moved to France with AS Monaco FC in January 2008, being scarcely used during his six-month loan spell. On 27 April, he scored in a 2–3 Ligue 1 home loss against Olympique de Marseille.

González was then bought by Valencia CF of La Liga. However, on 1 September 2008, he joined Newcastle United on loan until the end of the season; this move was the final straw for Newcastle's manager Kevin Keegan, who claimed he was forced to sign the player by executive director Dennis Wise after only seeing him play on YouTube, and believing González was not good enough for the team.

González picked up a serious achilles tendon injury early into the campaign, ruling him out of action for four months. In February 2009, coach Chris Hughton was quoted on the Magpies' official website as saying that González was recovering well, and was certain he would feature again for them. However, he did not, and returned to the Che in July 2009. A Premier League tribunal confirmed in October that the loan signing had been against manager Keegan's wishes, and was in breach of his contract, resulting in a compensation payout to the manager. The deal was reportedly done by Wise and Mike Ashley as a "favour" for two South American agents.

After not having appeared once during 2009–10, González was loaned to Levadiakos until the end of the 2009–10 Greek Super League season. He then returned to Spain, signing on loan with Levante UD, newly promoted to La Liga for 2010–11. He ruptured cruciate knee ligaments playing against Real Madrid in his third match for the club, did not appear again, and returned to Valencia in the following transfer window.

In late July 2011, González cut ties with Valencia and joined Standard Liège of the Belgian Pro League.

== International career ==
González made his debut for Uruguay in a 1–2 defeat to England on 1 March 2006, coming on as a late substitute at Anfield. Subsequently, he was part of the 2007 Copa América squad which finished fourth: in the semi-final against Brazil, he was brought on at half-time as the nation fought back to 2–2 to take the game into extra time; he then scored in the penalty shootout, but his team was eliminated.

González scored his first international goal in a 3–1 friendly win over Japan on 20 August 2008, at the Sapporo Dome. He was picked for the squad, which appeared at the 2010 FIFA World Cup, playing 63 minutes of the group stage opener against France (0–0 draw) as the Charrúas reached the last-four stage.

=== International goals ===
#	Date	Venue	Opponent	Score	Result	Competition
1.	20 August 2008	Sapporo Dome, Sapporo, Japan	Japan	0–2	1–3	Friendly

== Managerial career ==
In August 2023, González was named as the first ever manager of newly created Uruguay under-13 team. On 20 February 2024, Uruguayan Football Association confirmed that González will be the new Uruguay under-15 team manager. In March 2025, he became the manager of newly formed Uruguay under-16 team.

== Personal life ==
González is a devout and practicing Catholic.

== Honours ==
Danubio

- Uruguayan Primera División: 2004, 2006–07
