= Richard Páez =

Venezuelan footballer (born 1953)

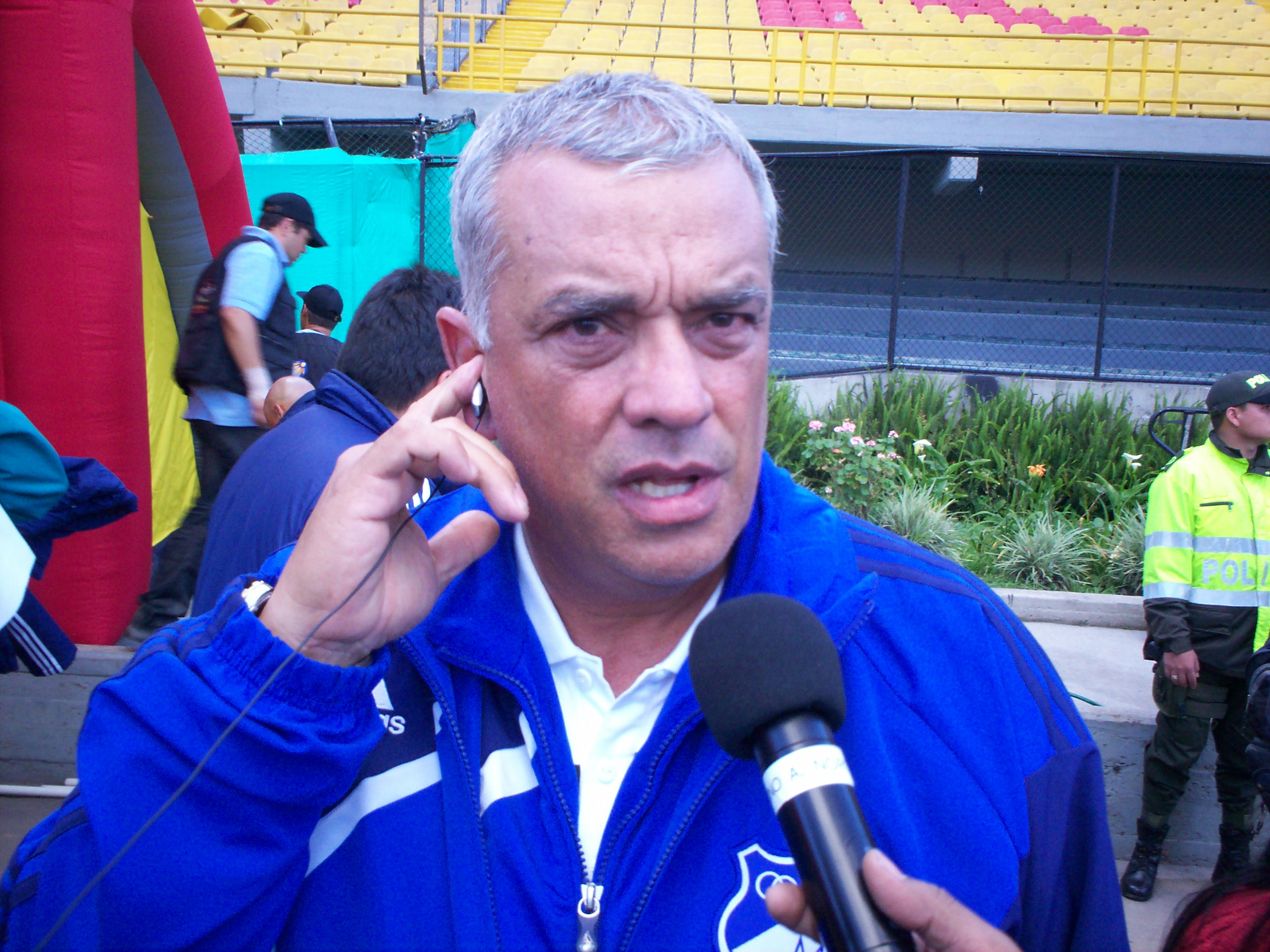

Personal information
- Full name: Richard Alfred Mayela Páez Monzón
- Date of birth: 31 December 1953 (age 72)
- Place of birth: Mérida, Venezuela
- Position: Midfielder

Senior career*
Years	Team	Apps	(Gls)
1970–1978	Estudiantes de Mérida		
1978–1979	Portuguesa		
1979	Unión Táchira		
1980–1981	ULA		

Managerial career
- 1991: ULA
- 1991: Deportivo Táchira
- 1995: ULA
- 1997–1999: Estudiantes de Mérida
- 2001–2007: Venezuela
- 2001–2003: Venezuela U20
- 2002: Venezuela U23
- 2008: Alianza Lima
- 2010–2012: Millonarios
- 2013–2014: Mineros
- 2018–2019: Deportivo Cuenca
- 2020: Mineros
- 2026: Cúcuta Deportivo
- * Club domestic league appearances and goals

Richard Alfred Mayela Páez Monzón known as Richard Páez (born 31 December 1953) is a Venezuelan football manager. He formerly coached the Venezuela national football team, and most recently managed Colombian club Cúcuta Deportivo.

== Playing career ==
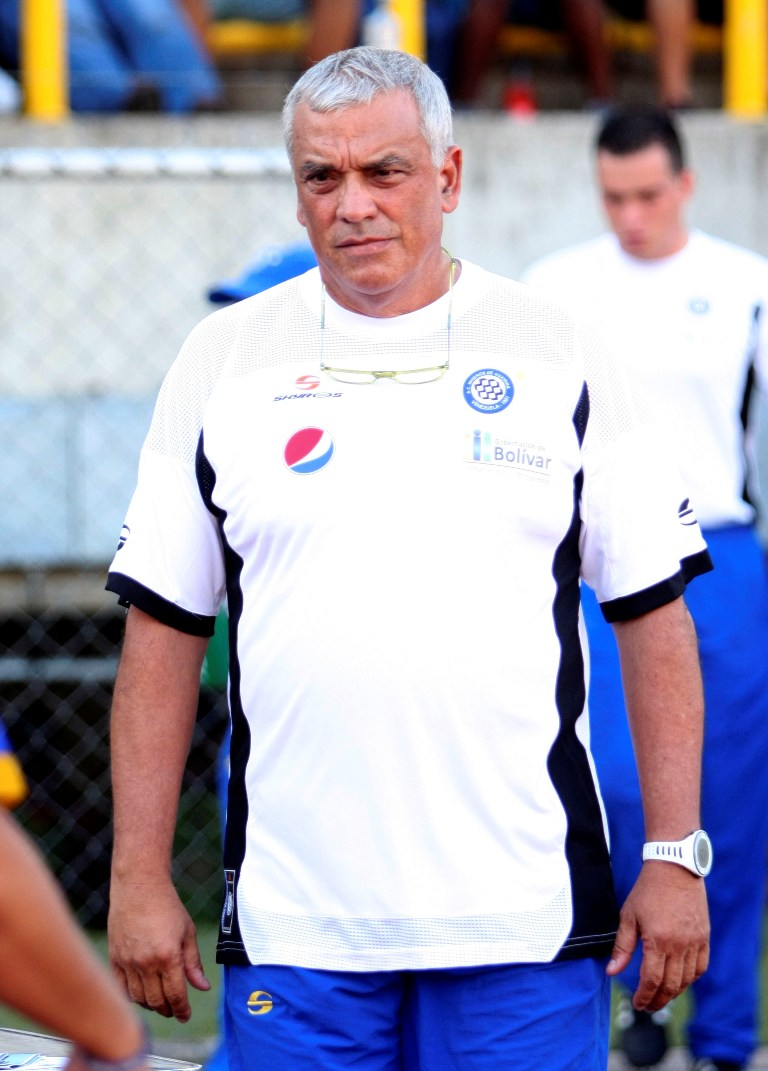
Páez managing Mineros in 2013

=== Club ===
Born in Mérida, Páez played club football for Estudiantes de Mérida, Portuguesa, Deportivo Táchira and Universidad de Los Andes.

=== International ===
He also played for the Venezuela national football team in the 1970s.

== Managerial career ==
During his tenure, which lasted from January 2001 to November 2007, Venezuela achieved its best period in international football, improving from its status of being the worst team in South America. The squad reached the semi-final of the 2011 Copa America, and also had several victories in FIFA World Cup qualifying.

In early 2008, he was signed as Alianza Lima's coach but was fired from his post a few months later.

In November 2011, Páez became the first Venezuelan football manager to win a competition outside of Venezuela when his team Millonarios won the Copa Postobón. In May 2012, he left Millonarios after one and one-half seasons in charge.

After coaching Mineros de Guayana in 2020, he remained inactive for six years until signing with Colombian club Cúcuta Deportivo on 5 February 2026. Páez left Cúcuta on a mutual agreement on 9 August 2026.

== Personal life ==
His son, Ricardo Páez, was a member of the national team.
