= Estadio José Pachencho Romero =

Sports venue in Maracaibo, Venezuela

Coordinates: 10°40′26.81″N 71°38′42.04″W

Estadio José Encarnación "Pachencho" Romero
- Pachencho
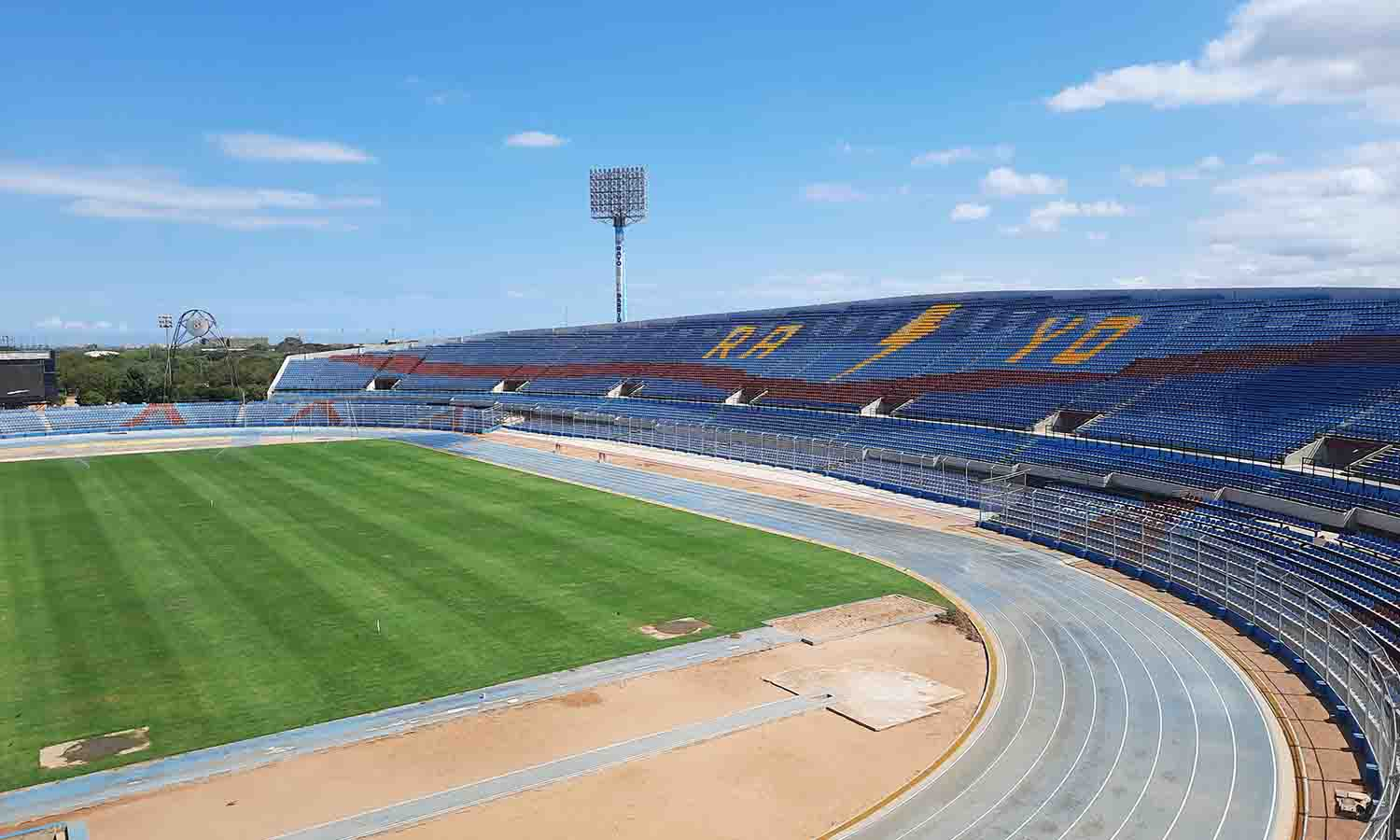
- The stadium refurbished in 2023
- Interactive map of Estadio José Encarnación "Pachencho" Romero
- Full name: Estadio Olímpico José Encarnación "Pachencho" Romero
- Location: Maracaibo, Venezuela
- Capacity: 40,800

Construction
- Built: 1969 - 1971
- Opened: 1971
- Renovated: 1998; 2007; 2021–2022
- Cost: US$14.1 million

Tenant
- Deportivo Rayo Zuliano

Estadio José Encarnación "Pachencho" Romero is a sports stadium in Maracaibo, capital of the Zulia state, in Venezuela. The stadium holds 40,800 spectators. The pitch was originally surrounded by both a running track and a scorched concrete cycling track, the latter being replaced with new stands due to the celebration of Copa América 2007.

The building is regarded as national cultural heritage of the Zulia state (code IFA 063,045). And their maintenance responsibility Case runs idem, Foundation attached to the Mayoralty Maracaibo. It was built because of the Bolivarian Sports Games of 1971 and remodeled on the occasion of the Games Central American and Caribbean Maracaibo 1998 in which the national team won a gold medal at the selection of Mexico. His name is in honor of a prominent athlete Zulia dedicated to athletics.

It was one of 9 locations in the Copa América Venezuela 2007 being the headquarters of the Grand Final, where they conducted a classic South American football selections found Argentina and Brazil, where the latter was entitled to defend his champion title Perú 2004.

On 2 July 2007 when he was still in development in the country's Copa América, the President of CONMEBOL Dr. Nicolás Leoz, announced that the Pachencho Romero stadium would host the World Cup Under-15 category 2008.

This stadium is one of many who belong to a conglomerate of several sports stadiums known as Polideportivo Luis Aparicio Jr. where others are also among the Luis Aparicio el Grande (baseball) and Peter Elías Belisario Aponte Gymnasium (basketball).

== Expansion and remodeling ==
Prior to the Copa América, in the stadium renovation work was done to accommodate a total of 40,800 spectators with the addition of two new stands in the large space behind the arc and use the cycling track. In order to obtain the right to host the final, the local committee decided to increase the capacity, putting a platform in the velodrome which disappeared and was replaced by a VIP area with capacity for 8 thousand people. These renovations were made to mark of the 2007 Copa América, where the stadium was used as one of 9 officers and headquarters as the venue that hosted the final.

== 2007 Copa América ==
The Estadio José Pachencho Romero hosten five matches during 2007 Copa América, including the final.

Date	Local time	Team No. 1	Result	Team No. 2	Round	Attendance
28 June 2007	18:35	Paraguay	5–0	Colombia	Group C	34,500
28 June 2007	20:50	Argentina	4–1	United States	Group C	34,500
2 July 2007	20:50	Argentina	4–2	Colombia	Group C	40,000
10 July 2007	20:50	Uruguay	2–2 (4–5 p)	Brazil	Semi-finals	38,100
15 July 2007	17:05	Brazil	3–0	Argentina	Final	40,000

Preceded by Estadio Nacional; Lima	Copa América; Final Venue; 2007	Succeeded by El Monumental; Buenos Aires
