= 2007 Copa Libertadores Second Stage =

The Second Stage of the 2007 Copa Libertadores was a group stage.

== Format ==
Twenty-six teams qualified directly into this round, plus six that advanced from the First Stage. This brings the total number of teams in the Second Stage to 32. The teams were drawn into eight groups of four. The teams in each group will play each other in a double round-robin format, playing the other teams in the group once at home and once away. Teams will be awarded 3 points for a win, 1 point for a draw, and 0 points for a loss. The following criteria will be used for breaking ties on points:

1. superior goal difference;
2. higher number of goals scored;
3. higher number of away goals scored;
4. draw.

The top two teams from each group advanced to the Round of 16.

== Groups ==
=== Group 1 ===
Pos	Team	Pld	W	D	L	GF	GA	GD	Pts
1	(Paraguay) Libertad (A)	6	4	1	1	9	4	+5	13
2	(Mexico) América (A)	6	4	0	2	12	10	+2	12
3	(Argentina) Banfield	6	3	0	3	8	8	0	9
4	(Ecuador) El Nacional	6	0	1	5	4	11	−7	1

Source: RSSSF
(A) Advanced to the round of 16
February 20, 2007
17:15

(Ecuador) El Nacional	1–2	(Mexico) América
Benítez 27'	(Report)	Fernández 42'; Villa 47'

Olímpico Atahualpa, Quito
Attendance: 9,246
Referee: Duarte (Colombia)

February 20, 2007
21:30

(Paraguay) Libertad	1–0	(Argentina) Banfield
Riveros 85'	(Report)

Defensores del Chaco, Asunción
Attendance: 3,457
Referee: Lopes (Brazil)

February 27, 2007
19:00

(Argentina) Banfield	4–1	(Ecuador) El Nacional
Cvitanich 8'; Andrizzi 24', 29'; Lucchetti 65'	(Report)	Calderón 22'

Florencio Solá, Banfield
Attendance: 5,773
Referee: Gaciba (Brazil)

March 1, 2007
20:30

(Mexico) América	1–4	(Paraguay) Libertad
Cuevas 41'	(Report)	Aquino 2'; Benítez 20', 79'; López 45'

Estadio Azteca, Mexico DF
Attendance: 36,000
Referee: Roberto Silvera (Uruguay)

March 6, 2007
17:00

(Ecuador) El Nacional	1–1	(Paraguay) Libertad
Calderón 67'	(Report)	López 78'

Olímpico Atahualpa, Quito
Attendance: ?
Referee: Ruiz (Colombia)

March 7, 2007
20:30

(Mexico) América	4–0	(Argentina) Banfield
Rojas 20'; Cabañas 23', 48'; Mosqueda 52'	(Report)

Estadio Azteca, Mexico DF
Attendance: 26,000
Referee: Chandia (Chile)

March 21, 2007
19:30

(Argentina) Banfield	3–1	(Mexico) América
Lujambio 25', 42'; Cvitanich 71'	(Report)	Cabañas 87'

Florencio Solá, Banfield
Attendance: 12,000
Referee: Grance (Paraguay)

March 22, 2007
18:00

(Paraguay) Libertad	1–0	(Ecuador) El Nacional
Bonet 10'	(Report)

Defensores del Chaco, Asunción
Attendance: ?
Referee: Baldassi (Argentina)

April 3, 2007
21:30

(Ecuador) El Nacional	0–1	(Argentina) Banfield
	(Report)	Quinteros 79'

Olímpico Atahualpa, Quito
Attendance: ?
Referee: Buitrago (Colombia)

April 11, 2007
18:30

(Paraguay) Libertad	1–2	(Mexico) América
López 7' (pen.)	(Report)	Cabañas 63', 75'

Defensores del Chaco, Asunción
Attendance: 12,500
Referee: Larrionda (Uruguay)

April 18, 2007
19:30

(Argentina) Banfield	0–1	(Paraguay) Libertad
	(Report)	Marín 55'

Florencio Solá, Banfield
Attendance: 6,570
Referee: Simon (Brazil)

18 April 2007
17:30

(Mexico) América	2–1	(Ecuador) El Nacional
Cabañas 30'; Fernández 67'	(Report)	Ayoví 17'

Estadio Azteca, Mexico DF
Attendance: 65,000
Referee: Andarcia (Venezuela)

=== Group 2 ===
Pos	Team	Pld	W	D	L	GF	GA	GD	Pts
1	(Mexico) Necaxa (A)	6	4	0	2	9	7	+2	12
2	(Brazil) São Paulo (A)	6	3	2	1	11	4	+7	11
3	(Chile) Audax Italiano	6	3	2	1	8	6	+2	11
4	(Peru) Alianza Lima	6	0	0	6	2	13	−11	0

Source: RSSSF
(A) Advanced to the round of 16
February 14, 2007
20:45

(Chile) Audax Italiano	0–0	(Brazil) São Paulo
	(Report)

San Carlos de Apoquindo, Santiago
Attendance: 3,413
Referee: Silvera (Uruguay)

February 20, 2007
21:45

(Peru) Alianza Lima	1–2	(Mexico) Necaxa
Ligüera 57'	(Report)	Moreno 17'; Salgueiro 32'

Alejandro Villanueva, Lima
Attendance: ?
Referee: Gamboa (Bolivia)

February 28, 2007
21:45

(Mexico) Necaxa	2–0	(Chile) Audax Italiano
Kléber 7'; Padilla 69'	(Report)

Victoria, Aguascalientes
Attendance: 15,000
Referee: Vázquez (Uruguay)

February 28, 2007
21:45

(Brazil) São Paulo	4–0	(Peru) Alianza Lima
Alex Silva 14', 78'; Leandro 57'; Júnior 86'	(Report)

Morumbi, São Paulo
Attendance: 19,722
Referee: Pezzotta (Argentina)

March 13, 2007
21:30

(Peru) Alianza Lima	1–3	(Chile) Audax Italiano
Silva 67'	(Report)	Villanueva 44'; Cereceda 80'; Moya 88'

Alejandro Villanueva, Lima
Attendance: ?
Referee: Reinoso (Ecuador)

March 21, 2007
19:00

(Mexico) Necaxa	2–1	(Brazil) São Paulo
Kléber 62'; Salgueiro 69'	(Report)	Jadílson 42'

Victoria, Aguascalientes
Attendance: 19,500
Referee: Pezzotta (Argentina)

March 27, 2007
18:30

(Chile) Audax Italiano	1–0	(Peru) Alianza Lima
Moya 26'	(Report)

Estadio Nacional, Santiago
Attendance: 1,606
Referee: Paniagua (Bolivia)

April 4, 2007
21:45

(Brazil) São Paulo	3–0	(Mexico) Necaxa
Souza 12'; Miranda 56'; Hugo 72'	(Report)

Morumbi, São Paulo
Attendance: 31,056
Referee: Baldassi (Argentina)

April 11, 2007
20:45

(Chile) Audax Italiano	2–1	(Mexico) Necaxa
Moya 23'; Romero 62'	(Report)	Salgueiro 54'

Monumental David Arellano, Santiago
Attendance: ?
Referee: Favale (Argentina)

April 18, 2007
20:30

(Peru) Alianza Lima	0–1	(Brazil) São Paulo
	(Report)	Borges 45'

Alejandro Villanueva, Lima
Attendance: 288
Referee: Intriago (Ecuador)

April 25, 2007
19:45

(Mexico) Necaxa	2–0	(Peru) Alianza Lima
Kléber 7'; Salgueiro 47'	(Report)

Victoria, Aguascalientes
Attendance: ?
Referee: Osses (Chile)

April 25, 2007
21:45

(Brazil) São Paulo	2–2	(Chile) Audax Italiano
Richarlyson 7'; Aloísio 22'	(Report)	Di Santo 15'; Villanueva 72'

Morumbi, São Paulo
Attendance: 20,795
Referee: Amarilla (Paraguay)

=== Group 3 ===
Pos	Team	Pld	W	D	L	GF	GA	GD	Pts
1	(Brazil) Grêmio (A)	6	3	1	2	4	4	0	10
2	(Colombia) Cúcuta Deportivo (A)	6	2	3	1	9	7	+2	9
3	(Colombia) Deportes Tolima	6	2	1	3	5	6	−1	7
4	(Paraguay) Cerro Porteño	6	2	1	3	4	5	−1	7

Source: RSSSF
(A) Advanced to the round of 16
February 13, 2007
19:15

(Colombia) Cúcuta Deportivo	0–0	(Colombia) Deportes Tolima
	(Report)

General Santander, Cúcuta
Attendance: 15,412
Referee: Hoyos (Colombia)

February 15, 2007
21:45

(Paraguay) Cerro Porteño	0–1	(Brazil) Grêmio
	(Report)	Lucas 52'

Gral. Pablo Rojas, Asunción
Attendance: ?
Referee: Baldassi (Argentina)

February 27, 2007
22:15

(Brazil) Grêmio	0–0	(Colombia) Cúcuta Deportivo
	(Report)

Olímpico Monumental, Porto Alegre
Attendance: 36,373
Referee: Pozo (Chile)

March 7, 2007
19:15

(Colombia) Deportes Tolima	1–0	(Paraguay) Cerro Porteño
Quintero 63'	(Report)

Manuel Murillo Toro, Ibagué
Referee: Rivera (Peru)

March 13, 2007
19:15

(Colombia) Cúcuta Deportivo	1–1	(Paraguay) Cerro Porteño
Perez 81'	(Report)	Ramírez 46'

General Santander, Cúcuta
Attendance: 16,789
Referee: Lunati (Argentina)

March 15, 2007
19:30

(Colombia) Deportes Tolima	1–0	(Brazil) Grêmio
Perlaza 35'	(Report)

Manuel Murillo Toro, Ibagué
Attendance: ?
Referee: Furchi (Argentina)

March 20, 2007
20:45

(Paraguay) Cerro Porteño	2–1	(Colombia) Cúcuta Deportivo
Ramírez 52'; Da Silva 66'	(Report)	Pérez 36'

Estadio Antonio Oddone Sarubbi, Ciudad del Este
Attendance: ?
Referee: Pompei (Argentina)

March 27, 2007
21:45

(Brazil) Grêmio	1–0	(Colombia) Deportes Tolima
Tuta 20'	(Report)

Olímpico Monumental, Porto Alegre
Attendance: 33,034
Referee: Vázquez (Uruguay)

April 10, 2007
20:15

(Paraguay) Cerro Porteño	1–0	(Colombia) Deportes Tolima
Morínigo 81'	(Report)

Defensores del Chaco, Asunción
Attendance: ?
Referee: Silvera (Uruguay)

April 11, 2007
19:45

(Colombia) Cúcuta Deportivo	3–1	(Brazil) Grêmio
Bustos 44'; Perez 75'; Castillo 88'	(Report)	Moreno 52' (o.g.)

General Santander, Cúcuta
Attendance: ?
Referee: Ortube (Bolivia)

April 24, 2007
19:15

(Colombia) Deportes Tolima	3–4	(Colombia) Cúcuta Deportivo
Charría 38', 63'; Quintero 49'	(Report)	Del Castillo 19'; Martínez 42'; Perez 71', 86'

Manuel Murillo Toro, Ibagué
Referee: Ruiz (Colombia)

April 24, 2007
21:15

(Brazil) Grêmio	1–0	(Paraguay) Cerro Porteño
Everton 69'	(Report)

Olímpico Monumental, Porto Alegre
Attendance: 44,612
Referee: Pezzotta (Argentina)

=== Group 4 ===
Pos	Team	Pld	W	D	L	GF	GA	GD	Pts
1	(Argentina) Vélez Sársfield (A)	6	3	2	1	6	3	+3	11
2	(Uruguay) Nacional (A)	6	3	1	2	9	5	+4	10
3	(Brazil) Internacional	6	3	1	2	7	7	0	10
4	(Ecuador) Emelec	6	1	0	5	3	10	−7	3

Source: RSSSF
(A) Advanced to the round of 16
February 13, 2007
21:30

(Ecuador) Emelec	0–1	(Argentina) Vélez
	(Report)	Bustamante 13'

George Capwell, Guayaquil
Attendance: ?
Referee: Arias (Paraguay)

February 21, 2007
21:45

(Uruguay) Nacional	3–1	(Brazil) Internacional
Vera 72'; Delgado 75'; Martínez 92'	(Report)	Hidalgo 37'

Parque Central, Montevideo
Attendance: 9,582
Referee: Pezzotta (Argentina)

February 28, 2007
19:15

(Argentina) Vélez	1–1	(Uruguay) Nacional
Escudero 45'	(Report)	Vera 46'

José Amalfitani Stadium, Buenos Aires
Attendance: 8,661
Referee: Fagundes (Brazil)

February 28, 2007
21:45

(Brazil) Internacional	3–0	(Ecuador) Emelec
Perdigão 26'; Índio 55'; Alexandre Pato 66'	(Report)

Gigante da Beira-Rio, Porto Alegre
Attendance: 34,327
Referee: Selman (Chile)

March 14, 2007
19:30

(Argentina) Vélez	3–0	(Brazil) Internacional
Castromán 16'; Escudero 20', 80'	(Report)

José Amalfitani Stadium, Buenos Aires
Attendance: ?
Referee: Amarilla (Paraguay)

March 22, 2007
21:30

(Ecuador) Emelec	1–0	(Uruguay) Nacional
Quiñónez 89'	(Report)

George Capwell, Guayaquil
Attendance: ?
Referee: Selman (Chile)

March 28, 2007
21:45

(Brazil) Internacional	0–0	(Argentina) Vélez
	(Report)

Gigante da Beira-Rio, Porto Alegre
Attendance: 35,258
Referee: Larrionda (Uruguay)

April 3, 2007
19:00

(Uruguay) Nacional	3–1	(Ecuador) Emelec
Viana 17'; Delgado 30'; Juárez 44'	(Report)	Morales Neumann 90'

Parque Central, Montevideo
Attendance: 10,246
Referee: Amarilla (Paraguay)

April 10, 2007
21:30

(Ecuador) Emelec	1–2	(Brazil) Internacional
Arroyo 45'	(Report)	Iarley 36'; Alexandre Pato 52'

George Capwell, Guayaquil
Attendance: ?
Referee: Rivera (Peru)

April 12, 2007
20:15

(Uruguay) Nacional	2–0	(Argentina) Vélez
Godín 34'; Castro 77'	(Report)

Parque Central, Montevideo
Attendance: ?
Referee: Chandía (Chile)

April 19, 2007
19:15

(Brazil) Internacional	1–0	(Uruguay) Nacional
Fernandão 80'	(Report)

Gigante da Beira-Rio, Porto Alegre
Attendance: ?
Referee: Selman (Chile)

April 19, 2007
19:15

(Argentina) Vélez	1–0	(Ecuador) Emelec
Escudero 19'	(Report)

José Amalfitani Stadium, Buenos Aires
Attendance: ?
Referee: Grance (Paraguay)

=== Group 5 ===
Pos	Team	Pld	W	D	L	GF	GA	GD	Pts
1	(Brazil) Flamengo (A)	6	5	1	0	10	4	+6	16
2	(Brazil) Paraná (A)	6	3	0	3	9	8	+1	9
3	(Bolivia) Real Potosí	6	1	3	2	8	9	−1	6
4	(Venezuela) Unión Atlético Maracaibo	6	0	2	4	8	14	−6	2

Source: RSSSF
(A) Advanced to the round of 16
February 14, 2007
19:45

(Bolivia) Real Potosí	2–2	(Brazil) Flamengo
Monteiro 13'; Aguilera 43'	(Report)	Roni 48'; Obina 66'

Mario Mercado Vaca Guzmán, Potosí
Attendance: ?
Referee: Rivera (Peru)

February 15, 2007
18:30

(Venezuela) Unión Atlético Maracaibo	2–4	(Brazil) Paraná
Arismendi 44'; Cásseres 66'	(Report)	Josiel 38'; Dinélson 55'; Henrique 56'; Gerson 68'

José "Pachencho" Romero, Maracaibo
Attendance: ?
Referee: Haro (Ecuador)

February 21, 2007
19:30

(Brazil) Paraná	2–0	(Bolivia) Real Potosí
Dinélson 62'; Daniel Marques 73'	(Report)

Durival Britto e Silva, Curitiba
Attendance: ?
Referee: Laverni (Argentina)

February 21, 2007
21:45

(Brazil) Flamengo	3–1	(Venezuela) Unión Atlético Maracaibo
Renato 16'; Souza 36'; Obina 45'	(Report)	Arismendi 89'

Maracanã, Rio de Janeiro
Attendance: 31,240
Referee: Osses (Chile)

March 13, 2007
18:00

(Venezuela) Unión Atlético Maracaibo	1–1	(Bolivia) Real Potosí
Fernández 72'	(Report)	Peña 64'

José "Pachencho" Romero, Maracaibo
Attendance: ?
Referee: Hoyos (Colombia)

March 14, 2007
21:45

(Brazil) Paraná	0–1	(Brazil) Flamengo
	(Report)	Renato 24'

Durival Britto e Silva, Curitiba
Attendance: 15,614
Referee: Gaciba (Brazil)

March 20, 2007
20:45

(Bolivia) Real Potosí	2–2	(Venezuela) Unión Atlético Maracaibo
Monteiro 13', 41'	(Report)	Cásseres 37'; Ballesteros 57'

Mario Mercado Vaca Guzmán, Potosí
Attendance: ?
Referee: Carpio (Ecuador)

March 21, 2007
21:50

(Brazil) Flamengo	1–0	(Brazil) Paraná
Souza 86'	(Report)

Maracanã, Rio de Janeiro
Attendance: ?
Referee: Simon (Brazil)

April 4, 2007
20:45

(Venezuela) Unión Atlético Maracaibo	1–2	(Brazil) Flamengo
Paulinho 76' (o.g.)	(Report)	Renato 11'; Renato Augusto 81'

José "Pachencho" Romero, Maracaibo
Attendance: ?
Referee: Carrillo (Peru)

April 10, 2007
18:00

(Bolivia) Real Potosí	3–1	(Brazil) Paraná
Rodríguez 13'; Brandan 69'; Monteiro 74'	(Report)	Gerson 29'

Mario Mercado Vaca Guzmán, Potosí
Attendance: ?
Referee: Grance (Paraguay)

April 18, 2007
21:45

(Brazil) Flamengo	1–0	(Bolivia) Real Potosí
Souza 12'	(Report)

Maracanã, Rio de Janeiro
Attendance: 14,964
Referee: Prudente (Uruguay)

April 18, 2007
21:45

(Brazil) Paraná	2–1	(Venezuela) Unión Atlético Maracaibo
Egídio 7'; Beto 14'	(Report)	Machado 70'

Durival Britto e Silva, Curitiba
Attendance: ?
Referee: Pompei (Argentina)

=== Group 6 ===
Pos	Team	Pld	W	D	L	GF	GA	GD	Pts
1	(Chile) Colo-Colo (A)	6	3	0	3	12	7	+5	9
2	(Venezuela) Caracas (A)	6	3	0	3	7	10	−3	9
3	(Ecuador) LDU Quito	6	2	2	2	7	8	−1	8
4	(Argentina) River Plate	6	2	2	2	5	6	−1	8

Source: RSSSF
(A) Advanced to the round of 16
February 22, 2007
17:45

(Venezuela) Caracas	1–0	(Ecuador) LDU Quito
Guerra 75'	(Report)

Brígido Iriarte, Caracas
Attendance: ?
Referee: Carrillo (Peru)

February 22, 2007
21:00

(Chile) Colo Colo	1–2	(Argentina) River Plate
Suazo 60'	(Report)	Ponzio 45'; Farías 54'

Monumental, Santiago
Attendance: ?
Referee: Torres (Paraguay)

March 7, 2007
17:00

(Ecuador) LDU Quito	3–1	(Chile) Colo Colo
Obregón 46'; Salas 77'; Guerrón 84'	(Report)	Suazo 31'

Casa Blanca, Quito
Attendance: 25,000
Referee: Duarte (Colombia)

March 8, 2007
21:30

(Argentina) River Plate	0–1	(Venezuela) Caracas
	(Report)	Velásquez 9'

Monumental, Buenos Aires
Attendance: ?
Referee: Pozo (Chile)

March 15, 2007
17:15

(Ecuador) LDU Quito	1–1	(Argentina) River Plate
Vera 15'	(Report)	Farías 54'

Casa Blanca, Quito
Attendance: ?
Referee: Chandía (Chile)

March 20, 2007
18:30

(Venezuela) Caracas	0–4	(Chile) Colo Colo
	(Report)	Sánchez 21', 59', 88'; Giménez 27'

General Santander, Cúcuta
Attendance: ?
Referee: Buitrago (Colombia)

March 29, 2007
21:00

(Argentina) River Plate	0–0	(Ecuador) LDU Quito
	(Report)

Monumental, Buenos Aires
Attendance: ?
Referee: Simon (Brazil)

March 30, 2007
18:15

(Chile) Colo Colo	2–1	(Venezuela) Caracas
Fierro 44'; Suazo (pk) 90'	(Report)	González 68'

Monumental, Santiago
Attendance: ?
Referee: Garay (Peru)

April 3, 2007
20:15

(Chile) Colo Colo	4–0	(Ecuador) LDU Quito
Fierro 50', 72'; Suazo 65'; Millar 78'	(Report)

Monumental, Santiago
Attendance: ?
Referee: Silvera (Uruguay)

April 5, 2007
20:15

(Venezuela) Caracas	3–1	(Argentina) River Plate
Rey 17'; Escobar 32', 37'	(Report)	Farías 29'

General Santander, Cúcuta
Attendance: ?
Referee: Larrionda (Uruguay)

April 25, 2007
17:30

(Ecuador) LDU Quito	3–1	(Venezuela) Caracas
Ayoví 23'; Urrutia 40'; Guerrón 56'	(Report)	Gonzalez 63'

Casa Blanca, Quito
Attendance: ?
Referee: Carrillo (Peru)

April 25, 2007
19:30

(Argentina) River Plate	1–0	(Chile) Colo Colo
Galván 62'	(Report)

Monumental, Buenos Aires
Attendance: 4500
Referee: Oliveira (Brazil)

=== Group 7 ===
Pos	Team	Pld	W	D	L	GF	GA	GD	Pts
1	(Mexico) Toluca (A)	6	4	0	2	10	6	+4	12
2	(Argentina) Boca Juniors (A)	6	3	1	2	11	5	+6	10
3	(Peru) Cienciano	6	3	0	3	12	9	+3	9
4	(Bolivia) Bolívar	6	1	1	4	5	18	−13	4

Source: RSSSF
(A) Advanced to the round of 16
February 14, 2007
17:30

(Bolivia) Bolívar	0–0	(Argentina) Boca Juniors
	(Report)

Hernando Siles, La Paz
Attendance: 20,413
Referee: Grance (Paraguay)

February 21, 2007
21:00

(Peru) Cienciano	1–2	(Mexico) Toluca
Hernández 37'	(Report)	De La Torre 71'; Velasco 87'

Garcilaso de la Vega, Cusco
Attendance: 18,000
Referee: Reinoso (Ecuador)

February 27, 2007
20:30

(Mexico) Toluca	1–2	(Bolivia) Bolívar
Da Silva 2'	(Report)	Viglianti 55'; Sillero 58'

Nemesio Díez, Toluca
Attendance: 16,000
Referee: Andarcia (Venezuela)

March 1, 2007
21:15

(Argentina) Boca Juniors	1–0	(Peru) Cienciano
Ibarra 81'	(Report)

Nuevo Gasómetro, Buenos Aires
Attendance: 11,800
Referee: Lopes (Brazil)

March 8, 2007
17:15

(Peru) Cienciano	5–1	(Bolivia) Bolívar
Mostto 63', 79'; Mariño 69', 82'; Ruiz 88'	(Report)	Cuellar 16'

Garcilaso de la Vega, Cusco
Attendance: ?
Referee: Haro (Ecuador)

March 14, 2007
21:00

(Mexico) Toluca	2–0	(Argentina) Boca Juniors
Ponce 7'; Sánchez 58'	(Report)

Nemesio Díez, Toluca
Attendance: 29,500
Referee: Larrionda (Uruguay)

March 22, 2007
21:15

(Argentina) Boca Juniors	3–0	(Mexico) Toluca
Maidana 15'; Riquelme 23'; Boselli 82'	(Report)

José Amalfitani Stadium, Buenos Aires
Attendance: ?
Referee: Amarilla (Paraguay)

March 28, 2007
18:30

(Bolivia) Bolívar	2–3	(Peru) Cienciano
Leitão 12', 67'	(Report)	Mariño 34'; González Vigil 64'; Uribe (pen) 82'

Hernando Siles, La Paz
Attendance: ?
Referee: Laverni (Argentina)

April 4, 2007
17:30

(Peru) Cienciano	3–0	(Argentina) Boca Juniors
González Vigil 49'; Mostto 80'; Miguel Torres 90'	(Report)

Garcilaso de la Vega, Cusco
Attendance: ?
Referee: Ruiz (Colombia)

April 12, 2007
21:30

(Bolivia) Bolívar	0–2	(Mexico) Toluca
	(Report)	Ponce 14'; Sánchez 89'

Hernando Siles, La Paz
Attendance: ?
Referee: Arias (Paraguay)

April 26, 2007
19:50

(Mexico) Toluca	3–0	(Peru) Cienciano
Morales 32' (pen.), 48'; Sánchez 69'	(Report)

Nemesio Díez, Toluca
Attendance: ?
Referee: Chandia (Chile)

April 26, 2007
21:15 (UTC-3)

(Argentina) Boca Juniors	7–0	(Bolivia) Bolívar
Palacio 32', 44'; Palermo 37' (pen.); Tordoya 52' (o.g.); Dátolo 58'; Marioni 65', 89'	(Report)

José Amalfitani Stadium, Buenos Aires
Attendance: ?
Referee: Grance (Paraguay)

=== Group 8 ===
Pos	Team	Pld	W	D	L	GF	GA	GD	Pts
1	(Brazil) Santos (A)	6	6	0	0	12	1	+11	18
2	(Uruguay) Defensor Sporting (A)	6	3	0	3	8	7	+1	9
3	(Argentina) Gimnasia y Esgrima	6	3	0	3	9	10	−1	9
4	(Colombia) Deportivo Pasto	6	0	0	6	3	14	−11	0

Source: RSSSF
(A) Advanced to the round of 16
February 13, 2007
20:00

(Uruguay) Defensor Sporting	3–0	(Argentina) Gimnasia y Esgrima
Ariosa 36'; Morales 63'; Pereira 72'	(Report)

Centenario, Montevideo
Attendance: 7,385
Referee: Pozo (Chile)

February 21, 2007
21:15

(Colombia) Deportivo Pasto	0–1	(Brazil) Santos
	(Report)	Maldonado 61'

Libertad, Pasto
Attendance: ?
Referee: Andarcia (Venezuela)

March 1, 2007
19:00

(Brazil) Santos	1–0	(Uruguay) Defensor Sporting
Zé Roberto 48'	(Report)

Urbano Caldeira, Santos
Attendance: 9,409
Referee: Baldassi (Argentina)

March 6, 2007
21:15

(Argentina) Gimnasia y Esgrima	3–2	(Colombia) Deportivo Pasto
Leal 28'; Pacheco D'Agosti 49'; Piergüidi 87'	(Report)	Rodas 10'; Valencia 70'

Ciudad de La Plata, La Plata
Attendance: ?
Referee: Selman (Chile)

March 14, 2007
21:45

(Brazil) Santos	3–0	(Argentina) Gimnasia y Esgrima
Basualdo 6' (o.g.); Santana 53'; Zé Roberto 71'	(Report)

Urbano Caldeira, Santos
Attendance: ?
Referee: Grance (Paraguay)

March 15, 2007
21:45

(Colombia) Deportivo Pasto	1–2	(Uruguay) Defensor Sporting
Rodas 26'	(Report)	Martínez 80'; De Souza 91'

Libertad, Pasto
Attendance: ?
Referee: Rivera (Peru)

March 22, 2007
19:00

(Argentina) Gimnasia y Esgrima	1–2	(Brazil) Santos
Leal 89'	(Report)	Marcos Aurélio 2'; Zé Roberto 90'

Ciudad de La Plata, La Plata
Attendance: ?
Referee: Silvera (Uruguay)

March 28, 2007
21:45

(Uruguay) Defensor Sporting	3–0	(Colombia) Deportivo Pasto
Itthuralde 16'; Morales 26'; Peinado 93'	(Report)

Centenario, Montevideo
Attendance: ?
Referee: Gaciba (Brazil)

April 5, 2007
19:00

(Uruguay) Defensor Sporting	0–2	(Brazil) Santos
	(Report)	Marcos Aurélio 68'; Rodrigo Tabata 84'

Centenario, Montevideo
Attendance: ?
Referee: Arias (Paraguay)

April 5, 2007
21:30

(Colombia) Deportivo Pasto	0–2	(Argentina) Gimnasia y Esgrima
	(Report)	Rosero 15' (o.g.); Leal 75'

Libertad, Pasto
Attendance: ?
Referee: Intriago (Ecuador)

April 19, 2007
21:30

(Argentina) Gimnasia y Esgrima	3–0	(Uruguay) Defensor Sporting
Leguizamón 24', 72'; Ithurralde 44' (o.g.)	(Report)

Ciudad de La Plata, La Plata
Attendance: ?
Referee: Fagundes (Brazil)

April 19, 2007
21:30

(Brazil) Santos	3–0	(Colombia) Deportivo Pasto
Carlinhos 7'; Pedrinho 45'; Rodrigo Tabata 87'	(Report)

Urbano Caldeira, Santos
Attendance: ?
Referee: Maldonado (Bolivia)
