= 2007 Copa Libertadores knockout stage =

The knockout stages of the Copa Libertadores 2007 tournament were played on a home and away basis. The aggregate score determines the team advancing to the next round, with the away goals rule and a penalty shootout as tiebreakers, in that order. No extra time is played.

== Seeding ==
The teams have been seeded 1 to 8 (first placed teams from group stage) and 9 to 16 (second placed teams from each group) and the ties will be 1 vs 16, 2 vs 15, etc.

Teams qualified as first place	Teams qualified as second place

Seed	Team	Points	GD	Group
1	(Brazil) Santos	18	+11	8
2	(Brazil) Flamengo	16	+6	5
3	(Paraguay) Libertad	13	+5	1
4	(Mexico) Toluca	12	+4	7
5	(Mexico) Necaxa	12	+2	2
6	(Argentina) Vélez	11	+3	4
7	(Brazil) Grêmio	10	0	3
8	(Chile) Colo-Colo	9	+5	6
9	(Mexico) América	12	+2	1
10	(Brazil) São Paulo	11	+7	2
11	(Argentina) Boca Juniors	10	+6	7
12	(Uruguay) Nacional	10	+4	4
13	(Colombia) Cúcuta Deportivo	9	+2	3
14	(Brazil) Paraná	9	+1	5
15	(Uruguay) Defensor Sporting	9	+1	8
16	(Venezuela) Caracas	9	-3	6

=== Bracket ===
Round of 16
1	(Brazil) Santos	2	3	5
16	(Venezuela) Caracas	2	2	4
8	(Chile) Colo-Colo	0	2	2
9	(Mexico) América	3	1	4
7	(Brazil) Grêmio	0	2	2
10	(Brazil) São Paulo	1	0	1
2	(Brazil) Flamengo	0	2	2
15	(Uruguay) Defensor	3	0	3
3	(Paraguay) Libertad	2	1	3
14	(Brazil) Paraná Clube	1	1	2
6	(Argentina) Vélez Sarsfield	0	3	3
11	(Argentina) Boca Juniors	3	1	4
5	(Mexico) Necaxa	2	0	2
12	(Uruguay) Nacional	3	1	4
4	(Mexico) Toluca	1	2	3
13	(Colombia) Cúcuta Deportivo	5	0	5

Quarterfinals
1	(Brazil) Santos	0	2	2
9	(Mexico) América	0	1	1
7	(Brazil) Grêmio	0	2	2 (4)
15	(Uruguay) Defensor	2	0	2 (2)
3	(Paraguay) Libertad	1	0	1
11	(Argentina) Boca Juniors	1	2	3
12	(Uruguay) Nacional	0	2	2
13	(Colombia) Cúcuta Deportivo	2	2	4

Semifinals
1	(Brazil) Santos	0	3	3
7	(Brazil) Grêmio (*) (a)	2	1	3
11	(Argentina) Boca Juniors	1	3	4
13	(Colombia) Cúcuta Deportivo	3	0	3

Final
7	(Brazil) Grêmio	0	0	0
11	(Argentina) Boca Juniors	3	2	5

(*) To prevent a final with two teams from the same country CONMEBOL has paired Santos FC with Grêmio in the Semi-Finals.

== Match summaries ==
=== Round of 16 ===
==== First leg ====
May 2, 2007
16:15 (UTC-4)

Caracas FC (Venezuela)	2 – 2	(Brazil) Santos FC
Velásquez 55'; Vielma 85'	(Report)	Zé Roberto 15'; Kléber 64'

Olímpico, Caracas
Attendance: 24,000
Referee: Reinoso (Ecuador)

May 2, 2007
17:30 (UTC-5)

América (Mexico)	3 – 0	(Chile) Colo-Colo
Cabañas 26'; Fernández 29'; Rojas 53'	(Report)

Azteca, Mexico City
Attendance: 47,307
Referee: Arias (Paraguay)

May 2, 2007
21:45 (UTC-3)

Defensor (Uruguay)	3 – 0	(Brazil) Flamengo
Navarro 5', 75'; González 49'	(Report)

Centenario, Montevideo
Attendance: 15,000
Referee: Chandía (Chile)

May 2, 2007
21:45 (UTC-3)

São Paulo FC (Brazil)	1 – 0	(Brazil) Grêmio
Miranda 57'	(Report)

Morumbi, São Paulo
Attendance: 73,473
Referee: Tardelli (Brazil)

May 2, 2007
21:45 (UTC-3)

Boca Juniors (Argentina)	3 – 0	(Argentina) Vélez Sársfield
Riquelme 9'; Palermo 61'; Rodríguez 89'	(Report)

La Bombonera, Buenos Aires
Attendance: 50,000
Referee: Baldassi (Argentina)

May 3, 2007
19:00 (UTC-3)

Paraná Clube (Brazil)	1 – 2	(Paraguay) Libertad
Josiel 50'	(Report)	Marín 70'; Barone 89'

Vila Capanema, Curitiba
Attendance: 12,393
Referee: Silvera (Uruguay)

May 3, 2007
21:10 (UTC-3)

Nacional (Uruguay)	3 – 2	(Mexico) Necaxa
Vera 7'; Godín 23'; Martínez 55'	(Report)	Kléber 9', 53'

Estadio Gran Parque Central, Montevideo
Attendance: 18,204
Referee: Fagundes (Brazil)

May 3, 2007
21:30 (UTC-5)

Cúcuta Deportivo (Colombia)	5 – 1	(Mexico) CD Toluca
Martínez 32', 43', 45'; Castro 34'; Del Castillo 89'	(Report)	Sanchéz 1'

General Santander, Cúcuta
Attendance: 36,304
Referee: Laverni (Argentina)

==== Second leg ====
May 8, 2007
19:45 (UTC-4)

Colo-Colo (Chile)	2 – 1	(Mexico) América
Castro (OG) 70'; Suazo 88'	(Report)	Infante 86'

Monumental David Arellano, Santiago
Attendance: 26,569
Referee: Larrionda (Uruguay)

May 8, 2007
21:15 (UTC-5)

CD Toluca (Mexico)	2 – 0	(Colombia) Cúcuta Deportivo
Zinha 21'; Scocco 90'	(Report)

Estadio Nemesio Díez, Toluca
Attendance: 26,557
Referee: Andarcia (Venezuela)

May 9, 2007
19:15 (UTC-3)

Vélez Sársfield (Argentina)	3 – 1	(Argentina) Boca Juniors
Zárate 14', 36'; Ocampo 80'	(Report)	Bustos (OG) 32'

José Amalfitani Stadium, Buenos Aires
Attendance: 40,232
Referee: Laverni (Argentina)

May 9, 2007
21:45 (UTC-3)

Flamengo (Brazil)	2 – 0	(Uruguay) Defensor
Renato 36', 47'	(Report)

Maracanã, Rio de Janeiro
Attendance: 67,367
Referee: Baldassi (Argentina)

May 9, 2007
21:45 (UTC-3)

Grêmio (Brazil)	2 – 0	(Brazil) São Paulo FC
Tcheco 17'; Diego Souza 74'	(Report)

Estádio Olímpico, Porto Alegre
Attendance: 46,350
Referee: Chandia (Chile)

May 10, 2007
18:30 (UTC-3)

Santos FC (Brazil)	3 – 2	(Venezuela) Caracas FC
Adaílton 34'; Zé Roberto 40', 66'	(Report)	Rey 23'; Carpintero 30'

Vila Belmiro, Santos
Attendance: 14,826
Referee: Amarilla (Paraguay)

May 10, 2007
20:00 (UTC-4)

Libertad (Paraguay)	1 – 1	(Brazil) Paraná Clube
Gamarra 84'	(Report)	Joelson 12'

Defensores del Chaco, Asunción
Attendance: 11,554
Referee: Selman (Chile)

May 10, 2007
21:30 (UTC-5)

Necaxa (Mexico)	0 – 1	(Uruguay) Nacional
	(Report)	Martínez 88'

Azteca, Mexico City
Attendance: 31,314
Referee: Pezzotta (Argentina)

=== Quarterfinals ===
==== First leg ====
May 15, 2007
21:00 (UTC-5)

Cúcuta Deportivo (Colombia)	2 – 0	(Uruguay) Nacional
Torres 74'; Pérez 89'	(Report)

General Santander, Cúcuta
Attendance: 42,400
Referee: Simon (Brazil)

May 16, 2007
19:30 (UTC-3)

Defensor (Uruguay)	2 – 0	(Brazil) Grêmio
Sorondo 1'; Martínez 43'	(Report)

Estadio Centenario, Montevideo
Attendance: 38,468
Referee: Selman (Chile)

May 16, 2007
19:45 (UTC-5)

América (Mexico)	0 – 0	(Brazil) Santos FC
	(Report)

Azteca, Mexico City
Attendance: 100,000
Referee: Silvera (Uruguay)

May 17, 2007
21:15 (UTC-3)

Boca Juniors (Argentina)	1 – 1	(Paraguay) Libertad
Palermo 90'	(Report)	Martínez 81'

La Bombonera, Buenos Aires
Attendance: 51,397
Referee: Ruiz (Colombia)

==== Second leg ====
May 22, 2007
20:15 (UTC-3)

Nacional (Uruguay)	2 – 2	(Colombia) Cúcuta Deportivo
Castro 12'; Vera 85'	(Report)	Bustos 22'; Pajoy 90'

Parque Central, Montevideo
Attendance: 20,000
Referee: Pezzotta (Argentina)

2007-05-23
19:15 (UTC-3)

Grêmio (Brazil)	2 – 0	(Uruguay) Defensor
Tcheco 22'; Teco 45'	(Report)
Penalties
Patrício (penalty scored); Lúcio (penalty scored); Douglas Costa (penalty scored); Ramón (penalty scored)	4 – 2	(penalty missed) Fadeuille; (penalty missed) Peinado; (penalty scored) de Souza; (penalty scored) Pereira

Estádio Olímpico, Porto Alegre
Attendance: 42,387
Referee: Amarilla (Paraguay)

May 23, 2007
21:45 (UTC-3)

Santos FC (Brazil)	2 – 1	(Mexico) América
Jonas 65'; Souto 71'	(Report)	Bilos 32'

Vila Belmiro, Santos
Attendance: 19,925
Referee: Ruiz (Colombia)

May 24, 2007
20:15 (UTC-4)

Libertad (Paraguay)	0 – 2	(Argentina) Boca Juniors
	(Report)	Riquelme 61'; Palacio 71'

Defensores del Chaco, Asunción
Attendance: 38,000
Referee: Chandia (Chile)

=== Semifinals ===
==== First leg ====
May 30, 2007
21:45 (UTC-3)

Grêmio (Brazil)	2 – 0	(Brazil) Santos FC
Tcheco 34'; Carlos Eduardo 36'	(Report)

Estádio Olímpico, Porto Alegre
Attendance: 46,123
Referee: Pezzotta (Argentina)

May 31, 2007
19:00 (UTC-5)

Cúcuta Deportivo (Colombia)	3 – 1	(Argentina) Boca Juniors
Pérez 40', 65'; Bustos 84'	(Report)	Ledesma 27'

General Santander, Cúcuta
Attendance: 42,000
Referee: Amarilla (Paraguay)

==== Second leg ====
June 6, 2007
21:45 (UTC-3)

Santos FC (Brazil)	3 – 1	(Brazil) Grêmio
Renatinho 45', 61'; Zé Roberto 76'	(Report)	Diego Souza 34'

Vila Belmiro, Santos
Attendance: 19,788
Referee: Torres (Paraguay)

June 7, 2007
19:15 (UTC-3)

Boca Juniors (Argentina)	3 – 0	(Colombia) Cúcuta Deportivo
Riquelme 44'; Palermo 61'; Battaglia 90'	(Report)

La Bombonera, Buenos Aires
Attendance: 50,653
Referee: Silvera (Uruguay)

=== Final ===
==== First leg ====
June 13, 2007
21:45 (UTC-3)

Boca Juniors (Argentina)	3 – 0	(Brazil) Grêmio
Palacio 18'; Riquelme 73'; Patrício (OG) 89'	(Report)

La Bombonera, Buenos Aires
Attendance: 50,993
Referee: Larrionda (Uruguay)

==== Second leg ====
June 20, 2007
21:45 (UTC-3)

Grêmio (Brazil)	0 – 2	(Argentina) Boca Juniors
	(Report)	Riquelme 69', 81'

Estádio Olímpico, Porto Alegre
Attendance: 51,851
Referee: Ruiz (Colombia)

== Champion ==
Copa Libertadores
2007 Winners

Club Atlético Boca Juniors
Sixth Title
