= 2007 Copa Libertadores First Stage =

This is the Preliminary Round of the Copa Libertadores 2007 tournament. A total of 12 teams played in a two-legged round with 6 teams proceeding to the next round. Team 1 played the first leg at home. The away goals rule was employed in this round. The preliminary round was played between January 24 and February 7.

Team 1	Agg.	Team 2	1st leg	2nd leg
Blooming (Bolivia)	0–6	(Brazil) Santos	0–1	0–5
Vélez Sársfield (Argentina)	5–1	(Uruguay) Danubio	3–0	2–1
Deportivo Táchira (Venezuela)	1–4	(Colombia) Deportes Tolima	1–2	0–2
Tacuary (Paraguay)	1–4	(Ecuador) LDU Quito	1–1	0–3
Cobreloa (Chile)	1–3	(Brazil) Paraná Clube	0–2	1–1
América (Mexico)	6–2	(Peru) Sporting Cristal	5–0	1–2

== Matches ==
=== First leg ===
31 January 2007

Blooming (Bolivia)	0–1	(Brazil) Santos
	Report	Pedro 48'

Estadio Ramón Tahuichi Aguilera, Santa Cruz
Attendance: 11,902
Referee: Líber Prudente (Uruguay)

30 January 2007

Vélez Sársfield (Argentina)	3–0	(Uruguay) Danubio
Zárate 13'; Balvorín 48'; Pellegrino 75'	Report

José Amalfitani Stadium, Buenos Aires
Referee: Heber Lopes (Brazil)

2007-01-30

Deportivo Táchira (Venezuela)	1–2	(Colombia) Deportes Tolima
Morán 37'	Report	Perlaza 44'; Charría 75' (pen.)

Estadio Polideportivo de Pueblo Nuevo, Maracaibo
Attendance: 250
Referee: Manuel Garay (Chile)

2007-02-01

Tacuary (Paraguay)	1–1	(Ecuador) LDU Quito
Villalba 38'	Report	Urrutia 64'

Estadio Roberto Bettega, Asunción
Attendance: 1,316
Referee: Salvio Fagundes (Brazil)

2007-02-01

Cobreloa (Chile)	0–2	(Brazil) Paraná
	Report	Henrique 15'; Josiel 88'

Estadio Municipal de Calama, Calama
Attendance: 9,765
Referee: René Ortubé (Bolivia)

2007-01-24

América (Mexico)	5–0	(Peru) Sporting Cristal
Rojas 20'; Cabañas 42', 66', 81'; Blanco 48'	(Report)

Estadio Nemesio Díez, Toluca
Attendance: 13,138
Referee: Rubén Selman (Chile)

=== Second leg ===
2007-02-07

Santos (Brazil)	5–0	(Bolivia) Blooming
Santana 2', 28'; Rodrigo Tiuí 36', 83'; Marcos Aurélio 76'	Report

Vila Belmiro, Santos
Attendance: 11,005
Referee: Sergio Pezzotta (Argentina)

Santos advanced on points 6–0.

2007-02-06

Danubio (Uruguay)	1–2	(Argentina) Vélez Sársfield
Stuani 45'	Report	Castromán 38'; Fabianesi 75'

Estadio Gran Parque Central, Montevideo
Referee: Carlos Chandía (Chile)

Vélez Sarsfield advanced on points 4–2.

2007-02-08

Deportes Tolima (Colombia)	2–0	(Venezuela) Deportivo Táchira
Savoia 19'; Perlaza 67'	Report

Estadio Manuel Murillo Toro, Ibagué
Referee: José Carpio (Ecuador)

Deportivo Tolima advanced on points 4–1.

2007-02-06

LDU Quito (Ecuador)	3–0	(Paraguay) Tacuary
Guerrón 24'; Samudio 54' (o.g.); Ambrosi 70'	Report

Estadio de Liga Deportiva Universitaria, Quito
Attendance: 11,686
Referee: Martín Vázquez (Uruguay)

LDU Quito advanced on points 4–1.

2007-02-07

Paraná (Brazil)	1–1	(Chile) Cobreloa
Nem 75'	Report	Mannara 89'

Estádio Vila Capanema, Curitiba
Attendance: 14,953
Referee: Antonio Arias (Paraguay)

Parana advanced on points 3–1.

2007-01-31

Sporting Cristal (Peru)	2–1	(Mexico) América
Rebosio 79'; Villalta 80'	Report	Saritama 84'

Estadio San Martín de Porres, Lima
Referee: Jorge Hoyos (Colombia)

América advanced on points 6–2.
