= 2012 Campeonato Paulista =

Campeonato Paulista - Série A1
- Season: 2012
- Champions: Santos (20th title)
- Relegated: Portuguesa; Guaratinguetá; Catanduvense; Comercial
- Matches: 202
- Goals: 628 (3.11 per match)
- Top goalscorer: Neymar (20)
- Biggest home win: Santos 6–1 Ponte Preta; Santos 5–0 Guaratinguetá; Santos 5–0 Catanduvense
- Biggest away win: Botafogo–SP 2–6 Palmeiras; Guaratinguetá 0–4 Mirassol; Linense 0–4 XV de Piracicaba
- Highest scoring: Botafogo–SP 2–6 Palmeiras (8 goals)
- Longest winning run: 8 games São Paulo (11th round - 18th round)
- Longest unbeaten run: 14 games Palmeiras (1st round - 14th round)
- Longest winless run: 13 games Comercial (5th round - 17th round)
- Longest losing run: 7 games XV de Piracicaba (6th round - 12th round)
- Highest attendance: 53,749; Santos 4–2 Guarani
- Lowest attendance: 278; São Caetano 2–2 Mirassol

The 2012 Campeonato Paulista de Futebol Profissional da Primeira Divisão - Série A1 (officially the Paulistão Chevrolet 2012 for sponsorship reasons) was the 111th season of São Paulo's top professional football league.

The finals were played between Santos and Guarani. Santos won 7–2 on aggregate. It was the third consecutive year that they won. This had happened for the first time since 1968, when Santos won three years in a row for the last time (1966/1967/1968).

== Format ==
The top eight teams in the First Stage qualifies to the Quarter-Finals. The bottom four teams will be relegated to the Série A2. Quarter and Semi-Finals will be played in one-legged matches. The best-four teams not qualified to the Semi-Finals not from the city of São Paulo or Santos FC, will compete in the Campeonato do Interior.

== Teams ==
São Bernardo, Barueri, Noroeste and Santo André were relegated to the Campeonato Paulista Série A2 after finishing in the bottom four spots of the table at the end of the 2011 season. Santo André were relegated after they played the finals in the 2010 season against Santos, being runner-up. The four relegated teams were replaced by XV de Piracicaba, Comercial, Guarani and Catanduvese, that were promoted from 2011 Série A2. Comercial return to play in the first division after 25 years away from it while XV de Piracicaba, Guarani and Catanduvense, are back after playing the last time in the years: 1995, 2009 and 1993 respectively.

Locations of the 2012 Campeonato Paulista teams

| Club | Home city | 2011 result |
|---|---|---|
| Botafogo–SP | Ribeirão Preto | 13th |
| Bragantino | Bragança Paulista | 15th |
| Catanduvense | Catanduva | 4th (Série A2) |
| Comercial | Ribeirão Preto | 3rd (Série A2) |
| Corinthians | São Paulo (Tatuapé) | 2nd |
| Guarani | Campinas | 2nd (Série A2) |
| Guaratinguetá | Guaratinguetá | 12th |
| Ituano | Itu | 16th |
| Linense | Lins | 14th |
| Mirassol | Mirassol | 7th |
| Mogi Mirim | Mogi Mirim | 11th |
| Oeste | Itápolis | 6th |
| Palmeiras | São Paulo (Perdizes) | 3rd |
| Paulista | Jundiaí | 10th |
| Ponte Preta | Campinas | 5th |
| Portuguesa | São Paulo (Pari) | 8th |
| Santos | Santos | 1st |
| São Caetano | São Caetano do Sul | 9th |
| São Paulo | São Paulo (Morumbi) | 4th |
| XV de Piracicaba | Piracicaba | 1st (Série A2) |

== First stage ==
=== League table ===
| Pos | Team | Pld | W | D | L | GF | GA | GD | Pts | Qualification or relegation |
|---|---|---|---|---|---|---|---|---|---|---|
| 1 | Corinthians | 19 | 14 | 4 | 1 | 28 | 11 | +17 | 46 | Advanced to the Knockout stage |
| 2 | São Paulo | 19 | 13 | 4 | 2 | 42 | 21 | +21 | 43 | Advanced to the Knockout stage |
| 3 | Santos | 19 | 12 | 3 | 4 | 46 | 18 | +28 | 39 | Advanced to the Knockout stage |
| 4 | Guarani | 19 | 11 | 3 | 5 | 26 | 18 | +8 | 36 | Advanced to the Knockout stage |
| 5 | Palmeiras | 19 | 10 | 6 | 3 | 37 | 24 | +13 | 36 | Advanced to the Knockout stage |
| 6 | Mogi Mirim | 19 | 10 | 5 | 4 | 32 | 22 | +10 | 35 | Advanced to the Knockout stage |
| 7 | Bragantino | 19 | 8 | 5 | 6 | 33 | 33 | 0 | 29 | Advanced to the Knockout stage |
| 8 | Ponte Preta | 19 | 8 | 4 | 7 | 34 | 31 | +3 | 28 | Advanced to the Knockout stage |
| 9 | Mirassol | 19 | 6 | 7 | 6 | 31 | 25 | +6 | 25 | Advanced to the Campeonato do Interior |
| 10 | Oeste | 19 | 6 | 7 | 6 | 32 | 30 | +2 | 25 | Advanced to the Campeonato do Interior |
| 11 | Linense | 19 | 6 | 5 | 8 | 31 | 40 | −9 | 23 | |
| 12 | São Caetano | 19 | 5 | 8 | 6 | 24 | 25 | −1 | 23 | |
| 13 | Paulista | 19 | 7 | 1 | 11 | 26 | 29 | −3 | 22 | |
| 14 | Ituano | 19 | 5 | 5 | 9 | 25 | 34 | −9 | 20 | |
| 15 | Botafogo–SP | 19 | 6 | 1 | 12 | 24 | 40 | −16 | 19 | |
| 16 | XV de Piracicaba | 19 | 5 | 3 | 11 | 23 | 29 | −6 | 18 | |
| 17 | Portuguesa | 19 | 4 | 6 | 9 | 22 | 29 | −7 | 18 | Relegated to the Série A2 |
| 18 | Guaratinguetá | 19 | 4 | 3 | 12 | 22 | 43 | −21 | 15 | Relegated to the Série A2 |
| 19 | Catanduvense | 19 | 2 | 7 | 10 | 19 | 36 | −17 | 13 | Relegated to the Série A2 |
| 20 | Comercial | 19 | 3 | 3 | 13 | 18 | 37 | −19 | 12 | Relegated to the Série A2 |

Updated to match(es) played on 15 April 2012. Source: Futpédia and UOL Esporte
Rules for classification: 1st points; 2nd goal difference; 3rd number of goals scored; 4th less red cards; 5th less yellow cards; 6th raffle;

=== Results ===
| Home \ Away | BRP | BRG | CAT | COM | COR | GUA | GTG | ITU | LIN | MIR | MOG | OES | PAL | PTA | PON | POR | SAN | SCA | SPA | PIR |
|---|---|---|---|---|---|---|---|---|---|---|---|---|---|---|---|---|---|---|---|---|
| Botafogo-SP | | | | 1–2 | | 2–1 | | 0–1 | | | 0–1 | | 2–6 | | 1–2 | | 1–4 | 2–3 | | 2–1 |
| Bragantino | 1–1 | | | 2–1 | | 1–0 | | | | | 2–0 | 1–4 | 1–2 | | | 1–1 | | 2–0 | 3–3 | |
| Catanduvense | 2–4 | 2–4 | | | | 1–2 | 1–3 | | 2–2 | | 0–2 | 1–1 | 1–1 | | 1–1 | | | | | |
| Comercial | | | 2–1 | | 3–3 | 0–2 | 2–1 | 0–1 | 3–4 | 0–1 | 1–3 | 0–2 | | | | | | | | |
| Corinthians | 1–0 | 1–1 | 2–1 | | | 1–1 | | | 1–0 | 2–1 | | | 2–1 | 1–0 | | | | | 1–0 | 1–0 |
| Guarani | | | | | | | | 2–0 | 2–1 | 2–0 | | 2–1 | 3–1 | 2–1 | | 1–0 | 0–2 | | | 2–0 |
| Guaratinguetá | 2–1 | 2–2 | | | 0–2 | 2–1 | | | | 0–4 | 1–1 | | 2–3 | | 2–1 | | | 2–2 | | |
| Ituano | | 1–4 | 1–1 | | 0–1 | | 3–0 | | 2–3 | 1–1 | | | | 2–1 | | | | 2–2 | 2–4 | |
| Linense | 1–3 | 2–1 | | | | | 4–2 | | | 1–1 | 0–2 | | 1–3 | | | | | 3–3 | 2–1 | 0–4 |
| Mirassol | 3–0 | 2–3 | 1–1 | | | | | | | | 2–2 | | | 1–2 | 3–3 | 4–2 | 1–3 | | 0–1 | 3–0 |
| Mogi Mirim | | | | | 1–1 | 3–0 | | 2–2 | | | | | | 3–1 | 1–3 | 3–1 | 3–1 | 1–0 | | 2–2 |
| Oeste | 2–3 | | | | 0–3 | | 2–1 | 4–2 | 1–1 | 0–0 | 1–2 | | | 2–1 | | 3–2 | | | 2–3 | |
| Palmeiras | | | | 2–2 | | | | 3–0 | | 0–1 | 2–0 | 1–1 | | | 2–1 | 1–1 | | 0–0 | 3–3 | 3–2 |
| Paulista | 0–1 | 2–0 | 3–1 | 3–0 | | | 2–2 | | 1–2 | | | | 0–1 | | | | 1–1 | 1–2 | | 2–1 |
| Ponte Preta | | 5–1 | | 1–0 | 1–2 | 1–1 | | 1–0 | 2–1 | | | 2–2 | | 4–1 | | 3–1 | | | 1–3 | |
| Portuguesa | 3–0 | | 0–0 | 3–0 | 0–2 | | 2–1 | 1–1 | 2–2 | | | | | 0–2 | | | 0–2 | | | 1–0 |
| Santos | | 2–0 | 5–0 | 2–0 | 1–0 | | 5–0 | 2–1 | 4–1 | | | 1–1 | 1–2 | | 6–1 | | | | | |
| São Caetano | | | 1–0 | 2–0 | 0–1 | 0–1 | | | | 2–2 | | 2–2 | | | 1–0 | 1–1 | 2–1 | | | 1–1 |
| São Paulo | 4–0 | | 2–0 | 1–1 | | 1–1 | 3–0 | | | | 2–0 | | | 3–1 | | 2–1 | 3–2 | 2–1 | | |
| XV de Piracicaba | | 2–3 | 0–2 | 2–1 | | | 2–0 | 1–2 | | | | 2–1 | | | 2–1 | | 1–1 | | 0–1 | |

Updated to match(es) played on 15 April 2012. Source: Futpédia
Legend: Blue = home team win; Yellow = draw; Red = away team win.

== Knockout stage ==
=== Bracket ===
Quarterfinals
1 | Corinthians | 2
8 | Ponte Preta | 3
4 | Guarani | 3
5 | Palmeiras | 2
2 | São Paulo | 4
7 | Bragantino | 1
3 | Santos | 2
6 | Mogi Mirim | 0

Semifinals
8 | Ponte Preta | 1
4 | Guarani | 3
2 | São Paulo | 1
3 | Santos | 3

Final
4 | Guarani | 0 | 2 | 2
3 | Santos | 3 | 4 | 7

=== Quarter-finals ===
| Team 1 | Score | Team 2 |
|---|---|---|
| São Paulo | 4–1 | Bragantino |
| Santos | 2–0 | Mogi Mirim |
| Corinthians | 2–3 | Ponte Preta |
| Guarani | 3–2 | Palmeiras |

=== Semi-finals ===
| Team 1 | Score | Team 2 |
|---|---|---|
| São Paulo | 1–3 | Santos |
| Guarani | 3–1 | Ponte Preta |

=== Finals ===
| Team 1 | Agg. | Team 2 | 1st leg | 2nd leg |
|---|---|---|---|---|
| Guarani | 2–7 | Santos | 0–3 | 2–4 |

== Campeonato do Interior ==
=== Semifinals ===
28 April
16:00 UTC-03:00

| Mogi Mirim | 3 – 2 | Oeste |
|---|---|---|
| Renê Júnior 30'; Hernane 68', 70' | Report | Wanderson 7'; Roger 57' |

Romildo Ferreira, Mogi Mirim
Attendance: 468
Referee: Rodrigo Guarizo Ferreira do Amaral

28 April
18:30 UTC-03:00

| Bragantino | 1 – 1 | Mirassol |
|---|---|---|
| Fernando Gabriel 39' | Report | Gilsinho 46' |
Penalties
| Fernando Gabriel (penalty scored); Giancarlo (penalty scored); Romarinho (penalty scored); Léo Jaime (penalty scored) | 4–2 | (penalty scored) Xuxa; (penalty missed) Luciano Sorriso; (penalty scored) Gilsinho; (penalty missed) Henrique Dias |

Nabi Abi Chedid, Bragança Paulista
Attendance: 447
Referee: Wilson Seneme

=== Finals ===
5 May
18:30 UTC-03:00
1st leg

| Bragantino | 2 – 4 | Mogi Mirim |
|---|---|---|
| Victor Ferraz 3'; André Astorga 31' | Report | João Paulo 20'; Felipe 27', 52'; Ronei 90+1' |

Nabi Abi Chedid, Bragança Paulista
Attendance: 2,077
Referee: Raphael Claus

12 May
18:30 UTC-03:00
2nd leg

| Mogi Mirim | 4 – 2 | Bragantino |
|---|---|---|
| Fernandinho 20'; Luciano Castan 23' (o.g.); Edson Ratinho 40' (pen.); Henrnane 52' | Report | Giancarlo 45+1'; Léo Jaime 89' |

Romildo Ferreira, Mogi Mirm
Attendance: 3,609
Referee: Jose Claudio Rocha Filho

== Statistics ==
=== Top goalscorers ===
| Rank | Name | Club | Goals |
|---|---|---|---|
| 1 | (Brazil) Neymar | Santos | 20 |
| 2 | (Brazil) Hernane | Mogi Mirim | 16 |
| 3 | (Brazil) Giancarlo | Bragantino | 13 |
| 4 | (Brazil) Willian José | São Paulo | 11 |
| 5 | (Brazil) Fumagalli | Guarani | 9 |
| 5 | (Brazil) Xuxa | Mirassol | 9 |
| 7 | (Argentina) Hernán Barcos | Palmeiras | 8 |
| 7 | (Brazil) Marcelo Costa | São Caetano | 8 |
| 7 | (Brazil) Henrique Dias | Mirassol | 8 |
| 7 | (Brazil) Edson | Botafogo–SP | 8 |
| 7 | (Brazil) Felipe | Mogi Mirim | 8 |
| 7 | (Brazil) Lenílson | Linense | 8 |
| 7 | (Brazil) Mazinho | Oeste | 8 |

Source UOL Esporte and Futebol Paulista
Last updated: 13 May 2012

=== Hat-tricks ===
| Player | For | Against | Result | Date |
|---|---|---|---|---|
| (Brazil) Neymar | Santos | Botafogo | 4–1 | 9 February 2012 |
| (Brazil) Willian José | São Paulo | Paulista | 3–1 | 16 February 2012 |
| (Brazil) Fernando Gabriel | Bragantino | Catanduvense | 3–1 | 26 February 2012 |
| (Brazil) Neymar | Santos | Guaratinguetá | 5–0 | 29 March 2012 |
| (Brazil) Neymar | Santos | São Paulo | 3–1 | 29 April 2012 |

=== Scoring ===
- First goal of the season: Dener for Paulista against Portuguesa (21 January 2012)
- Last goal of the season: Alan Kardec for Santos against Guarani (13 May 2012).
- Fastest goal of the season: 17 seconds – Hernane for Mogi Mirim against Linense (25 March 2012)
- Largest winning margin: 5 goals
  - Santos 6–1 Ponte Preta (25 February 2012)
  - Santos 5–0 Guaratinguetá (29 March 2012)
  - Santos 5–0 Catanduvense (15 April 2012)
- Highest scoring game: 8 goals
  - Botafogo–SP 2–6 Palmeiras (11 March 2012)
- Most goals scored in a match by a single team: 6 goals
  - Botafogo–SP 2–6 Palmeiras (11 March 2012)
  - Santos 6–1 Ponte Preta (25 February 2012)
- Most goals scored in a match by a losing team: 3 goals
  - Comercial 3–4 Linense (21 January 2012)

=== Discipline ===
- Most yellow cards (club): 83
  - Bragantino
- Most yellow cards (player): 9
  - Alan Mota (Ituano)
  - Domingos (Guarani)
  - Guilherme Andrade (Ponte Preta)
- Most red cards (club): 8
  - Guaratingetá
- Most red cards (player): 2
  - Alan Mota (Ituano)

== Awards ==
=== Team of the year ===
| Pos. | Player | Club |
|---|---|---|
| GK | (Brazil) Rafael | Santos |
| DF | (Brazil) Oziel | Guarani |
| DF | (Brazil) Edu Dracena | Santos |
| DF | (Brazil) Rhodolfo | São Paulo |
| DF | (Brazil) Cortês | São Paulo |
| MF | (Brazil) Marcos Assunção | Palmeiras |
| MF | (Brazil) Paulinho | Corinthians |
| MF | (Brazil) Lucas | São Paulo |
| MF | (Brazil) Ganso | Santos |
| FW | (Brazil) Neymar | Santos |
| FW | (Brazil) Hernane | Mogi Mirim |

Source Globo Esporte and Lancenet
Last updated: 14 May 2012

=== Player of the Season ===
The Player of the Year was awarded to Neymar.

=== Young Player of the Season ===
The Young Player of the Year was awarded to Romarinho.

=== Countryside Best Player of the Season ===
The Countryside Best Player of the Year was awarded to Fumagalli.

=== Top scorer of the Season ===
The Top scorer award went to Neymar, who scored 20 goals.
