= Fernando Brandán =

Fernando Brandán may refer to:

- Fernando Brandán (footballer, born 1980), Argentine footballer
- Fernando Brandán (footballer, born 1990), Argentine footballer
