= 2012 Campeonato Paulista knockout stage =

The knockout stage of the 2012 Campeonato Paulista began on 21 April with the quarter-finals, and concluded on 12 May 2012 with the final at Morumbi in São Paulo.

== Round and draw dates ==
All draws held at Federação Paulista de Futebol headquarters in São Paulo, Brazil.

Round	Draw date	First leg	Second leg
Quarter-finals	17 April 2012	21, 22 April 2012	–
Semi-finals	23 April 2012	29 April 2012	–
Finals	3 May 2012	6 May 2012	13 May 2012

== Format ==
The quarter-finals are played in one match at stadium of the best teams in the first phase. The 1st placed confronts the 8th, 2nd against the 7th, the 3rd against 6th and 4th against 5th. If no goals are scored during the match, the tie is decided by penalty shootout. The semi-finals are played in the same way of the quarter-finals. The final matches are played over two legs, with the best campaign team in previous stages playing the second match at home.

== Qualified teams ==
Pos	Team	Pld	W	D	L	GF	GA	GD	Pts
1	Corinthians	19	14	4	1	28	11	+17	46
2	São Paulo	19	13	4	2	42	21	+21	43
3	Santos	19	12	3	4	46	18	+28	39
4	Guarani	19	11	3	5	26	18	+8	36
5	Palmeiras	19	10	6	3	37	24	+13	36
6	Mogi Mirim	19	10	5	4	32	22	+10	35
7	Bragantino	19	8	5	6	33	33	0	29
8	Ponte Preta	19	8	4	7	34	31	+3	28

Source: Globo Esporte and UOL Esporte
Rules for classification: 1) points; 2) goal difference; 3) number of goals scored.

== Bracket ==
Quarterfinals
1	Corinthians	2
8	Ponte Preta	3
4	Guarani	3
5	Palmeiras	2
2	São Paulo	4
7	Bragantino	1
3	Santos	2
6	Mogi Mirim	0

Semifinals
8	Ponte Preta	1
4	Guarani	3
2	São Paulo	1
3	Santos	3

Final
4	Guarani	0	2	2
3	Santos	3	4	7

== Quarter-finals ==
Team 1	Score	Team 2
São Paulo (Brazil)	4–1	(Brazil) Bragantino
Santos (Brazil)	2–0	(Brazil) Mogi Mirim
Corinthians (Brazil)	2–3	(Brazil) Ponte Preta
Guarani (Brazil)	3–2	(Brazil) Palmeiras

21 April
18:30 UTC-03:00

São Paulo	4 – 1	Bragantino
Fernandinho 19'; Luís Fabiano 52', 68'; Osvaldo 83'	Report	Junior Lopes 64'

Morumbi, São Paulo
Attendance: 25,555
Referee: Wilson Seneme

22 April
16:00 UTC-03:00

Santos	2 – 0	Mogi Mirim
Maranhão 22'; Neymar 71'	Report

Vila Belmiro, Santos
Attendance: 10,635
Referee: Flávio Luís Guerra

22 April
16:00 UTC-03:00

Corinthians	2 – 3	Ponte Preta
Willian 74'; Alex 90'	Report	Willian Magrão 12'; Roger 34'; Rodrigo Pimpão 89'

Pacaembu, São Paulo
Attendance: 24,254
Referee: Rodrigo Braghetto

22 April
18:30 UTC-03:00

Guarani	3 – 2	Palmeiras
Fumagalli 50'; Fabinho 53', 90'	Report	Marcos Assunção 54'; Henrique 90+3'

Brinco de Ouro, Campinas
Attendance: 15,005
Referee: Vinicius Furlan

== Semi-finals ==
Team 1	Score	Team 2
São Paulo (Brazil)	1–3	(Brazil) Santos
Guarani (Brazil)	3–1	(Brazil) Ponte Preta

29 April
16:00 UTC-03:00

São Paulo	1 – 3	Santos
Willian José 63'	Report	Neymar 3' (pen.), 31', 77'

Morumbi, São Paulo
Attendance: 47,771
Referee: Paulo César de Oliveira

29 April
18:30 UTC-03:00

Guarani	3 – 1	Ponte Preta
Fabinho 52'; Medina 67', 86'	Report	Caio 39'

Brinco de Ouro, Campinas
Attendance: 15,179
Referee: Flávio Rodrigues Guerra

== Finals ==
Team 1	Agg.	Team 2	1st leg	2nd leg
Guarani (Brazil)	2–7	(Brazil) Santos	0–3	2–4

=== First leg ===
6 May
16:00 UTC-03:00

Guarani	0 – 3	Santos
	Report	Ganso 42'; Neymar 65', 90+1'

Morumbi, São Paulo
Attendance: 40,146
Referee: Wilson Seneme

=== Second leg ===
13 May
16:00 UTC-03:00

Santos	4 – 2	Guarani
Alan Kardec 1', 90'; Neymar 8', 71'	Report	Fabinho 4'; Bruno Mendes 16'

Morumbi, São Paulo
Attendance: 53,749
Referee: Paulo César de Oliveira
