= Rubén Bustos =

Colombian footballer (born 1981)

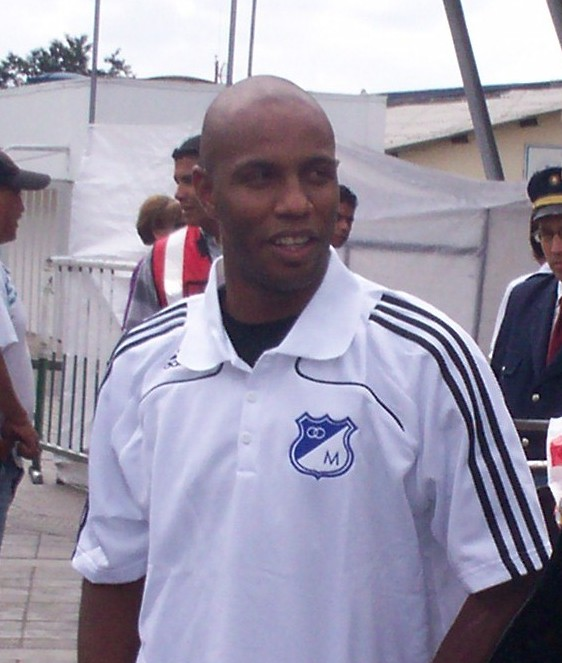

Personal information
- Full name: Rubén Darío Bustos Torres
- Date of birth: August 28, 1981 (age 45)
- Place of birth: Villa del Rosario, Norte de Santander, Colombia
- Height: 1.71 m (5 ft 7 in)
- Position: Right-back

Youth career
- CD América de Cali

Senior career*
Years	Team	Apps	(Gls)
1999–2007	América de Cali	143	(11)
2004	→ Atlético Nacional (loan)	19	(2)
2007	→ Cúcuta Deportivo (loan)	19	(0)
2007	→ Grêmio FBPA (loan)	18	(1)
2008–2011	Internacional	18	(2)
2009–2010	→ Millonarios (loan)	42	(6)
2011–2012	América de Cali	38	(4)
2013	Boyacá Chicó	15	(1)
2013	Cúcuta Deportivo	7	(0)

International career^{‡}
2003–2008	Colombia	12	(2)
- * Club domestic league appearances and goals as of January 14, 2014 ‡ National team caps and goals as of November 16, 2009

Rubén Darío Bustos Torres (born August 18, 1981) is a Colombian retired football player, He played as a defender

Rubén Darío is often confused with his brother, Darío Alberto Bustos, who is also a Colombian football player currently playing for Cúcuta Deportivo; he has 4 children, whose names are Diego Fernando Bustos, who plays in the America de Cali under 17 soccer team, Fredy Emanuel Bustos, who plays in traveling team in the US named South Miami United F.C., Samuel Bustos, and Santiago Bustos.

He was part of Cúcuta 2006 Colombian 1st division Championship and helped Cúcuta Deportivo from the Copa Mustang get to the semifinals of the Copa Libertadores 2007. He scored the 2 goals by free kicks to help Cúcuta reach the semifinals. In July 2007 he signed on loan with Gremio in Brasil. After Campeonato Brasileiro 2007, Bustos signed a professional contract with Brazilian team Internacional, main rival of his last team. For 2009, Bustos has been contacted to play again back in his country for Millonarios de Bogotá. Millonarios' coach Oscar Quintabani and president of Millonarios Juan Carlos Lopez have confirmed the transaction on loan.

Bustos has moved back to Internacional in 2010, where he is contracted until 2012, but he was dropped to the club's reserves team. In July 2011, he moved to his first professional team América de Cali.

In November 2007, he helped Colombia win both its matches of the 2010 FIFA World Cup qualifiers versus Venezuela and Argentina by scoring two free kick goals.

== Career statistics ==
=== International ===
Appearances and goals by national team and year
National team	Year	Apps	Goals
Colombia	2003	3	0
Colombia	2007	4	2
Colombia	2008	5	0
Total		12	2

Scores and results list Colombia's goal tally first, score column indicates score after each Bustos goal.

List of international goals scored by Rubén Bustos
No.	Date	Venue	Opponent	Score	Result	Competition	Ref.
1	17 November 2007	Estadio El Campín, Bogotá, Colombia	Venezuela	1–0	1–0	2010 FIFA World Cup qualification	
2	21 November 2007	Estadio El Campín, Bogotá, Colombia	Argentina	1–1	2–1	2010 FIFA World Cup qualification	
