= Giancarlo (footballer, born 1982) =

Brazilian footballer

Personal information
- Full name: Giancarlo da Silva Moro
- Date of birth: 18 October 1982 (age 44)
- Place of birth: Turvo, Brazil
- Height: 1.90 m (6 ft 3 in)
- Position: Striker

Team information
- Current team: Pakhtakor Tashkent FK
- Number: 29

Senior career*
Years	Team	Apps	(Gls)
2003–2004	America		
2004–2005	Londrina		
2005–2006	Iraty		
2006	Novo Hamburgo		
2006–2007	Juventude		
2007	Portuguesa		
2007–2008	Joinville		
2009	Novo Hamburgo		
2009	Glória		
2009	Chapecoense		
2009	Atlético Ibirama		
2010	Union Alexandria		
2011	Paraná		
2012	Bragantino		
2012–2013	Ponte Preta		
2013	Criciúma		
2013–	São Caetano		
- * Club domestic league appearances and goals as of 16:05, 23 February 2012 (UTC)

Giancarlo da Silva Moro (born 18 October 1982) is a Brazilian professional footballer who plays for Paraná Clube, as a striker.

== Career ==
Born in Turvo, Giancarlo has played for America, Londrina, Iraty, Novo Hamburgo, Juventude, Portuguesa, Joinville, Glória, Chapecoense, Atlético Ibirama, Union Alexandria, Paraná and Bragantino.
