= Daniel Quinteros =

Argentine footballer

Personal information
- Full name: Daniel Eduardo Quinteros
- Date of birth: 10 March 1976 (age 50)
- Place of birth: Rosario, Argentina
- Height: 1.73 m (5 ft 8 in)
- Position: Defensive midfielder

Senior career*
Years	Team	Apps	(Gls)
1996–2003	Rosario Central	103	(6)
1998–1999	→Almirante Brown (loan)	32	(6)
2003–2004	Independiente	28	(4)
2005	Club Libertad	13	(0)
2006	Lanús	13	(0)
2006	Germinal Beerschot	8	(0)
2007–2008	Banfield	42	(0)
2008–2011	Apollon Limassol	55	(1)

Managerial career
- Apollon Limassol
- * Club domestic league appearances and goals as of 20 May 2010

Daniel Quinteros (born 10 March 1976,) is a retired Argentine football midfielder. He last played for Apollon Limassol in the League Marfin Laiki. He is currently the team manager of Apollon Limassol.

== Career ==
Quinteros started his career in 1996 at Rosario Central in the Primera División. During the 1998–1999 season, he was loaned to Primera B Nacional club Almirante Brown. After the loan period, he returned to Rosario Central until 2003.

Club Atlético Independiente signed him for the 2003–2004 season. In 2005, he was sold to Club Libertad in Paraguay. In 2006, he returned to Argentina to play for Club Atlético Lanús before signing a four-year deal with Germinal Beerschot in the Belgian League. However, his contract was terminated by mutual consent on November 5, 2006. Quinteros only played eight first team games for Germinal Beerschot before returning to Argentina to play for Club Atlético Banfield.
