= Sebastián Ariosa =

Uruguayan footballer (born 1985)

Personal information
- Full name: Sergio Sebastián Ariosa Moreira
- Date of birth: 5 June 1985 (age 41)
- Place of birth: Montevideo, Uruguay
- Height: 1.74 m (5 ft 9 in)
- Position: Left back

Team information
- Current team: San Lorenzo

Youth career
- –2004: Defensor

Senior career*
Years	Team	Apps	(Gls)
2004–2011	Defensor		
2011–2014	Olimpia	79	(2)
2015–2016	Defensor	16	(0)
2016–2018	Sportivo Luqueño	31	(0)
2019–	San Lorenzo	5	(0)
- * Club domestic league appearances and goals as of 21 April 2018

Sergio Sebastián Ariosa Moreira (born 5 June 1985 in Montevideo, Uruguay) is a Uruguayan footballer who plays for San Lorenzo.

== Olimpia ==
On 15 January 2011, Ariosa signs for Paraguayan Club Olimpia.

== Illness and legal case ==
Ariosa was diagnosed with a chest tumor in 2013, and was suspended by Olimpia for missing training due to his chemotherapy. He terminated his link with the club in January 2014. In August 2015, the Court of Arbitration for Sport ordered Olimpia to pay compensation to Ariosa for moral damages. He had since recovered from his illness.

== Teams ==
- Defensor Sporting 2004-2010
- Olimpia 2011-2014
- Defensor Sporting 2015–present

== Titles ==
- Defensor Sporting 2007-2008 (Uruguayan Championship)
- Club Olimpia Clausura 2011 (Paraguayan Championship)
