= Rodeio Bonito =

Municipality in Rio Grande do Sul, Brazil

Coordinates: 27°28′S 53°10′W

- Municipality
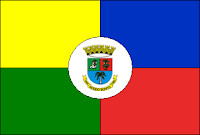
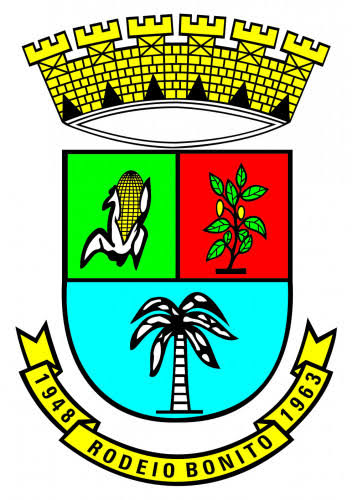
- Flag Coat of arms
- Interactive map of Rodeio Bonito
- Country: Brazil
- Time zone: UTC−3 (BRT)

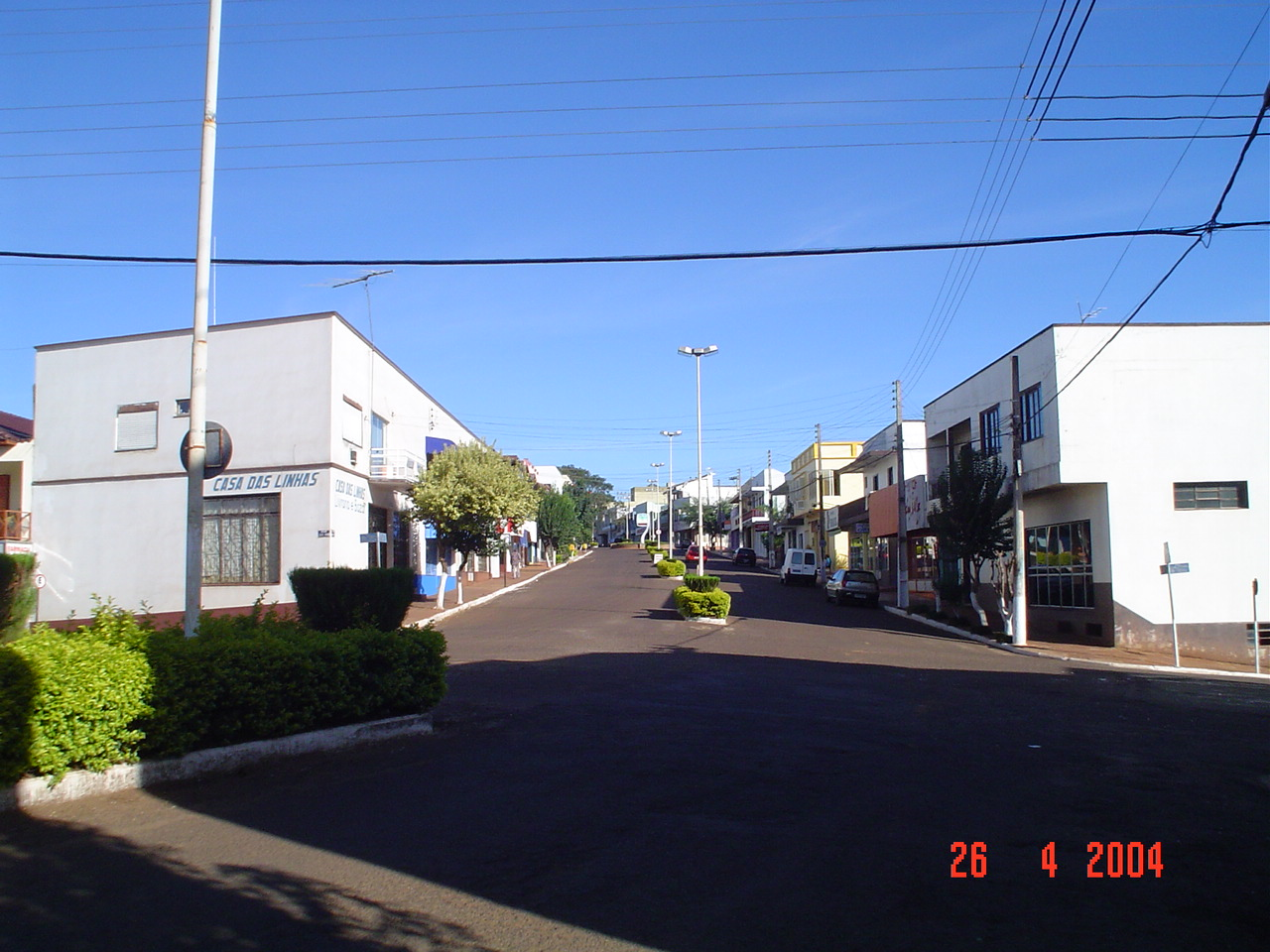
Street of Rodeio Bonito

Rodeio Bonito is a municipality in the state of Rio Grande do Sul, Brazil. As of 2020, the estimated population was 5,868.

== See also ==
- List of municipalities in Rio Grande do Sul
