= Patrocinio Samudio =

Paraguayan footballer (1975–2017)

Patrocinio Samudio (17 March 1975 – 2 October 2017) was a Paraguayan professional footballer who played as a defender. He died on 2 October 2017 from a cardiac arrest, at the age of 42.

== Career ==
- Presidente Hayes 1997
- Guaraní 1998
- Nacional 1999
- Universal 2000
- River Plate (Asunción) 2001–2002
- 12 de Octubre 2003
- Nacional 2004
- Tacuary 2004–2009
- Fernando de la Mora 2010–2011
- 2 de Mayo 2012–2017
