= Santiago Bustos =

Argentine professional footballer

Personal information
- Full name: Santiago Enrique Bustos
- Date of birth: 25 March 1998 (age 28)
- Place of birth: Chacabuco, Argentina
- Height: 1.75 m (5 ft 9 in)
- Position: Left-back

Team information
- Current team: Ferro (GP)
- Number: 3

Youth career
- 2011–2015: Vélez Sarsfield
- 2015–2018: San Lorenzo
- 2018–2020: All Boys

Senior career*
Years	Team	Apps	(Gls)
2019–2020	All Boys	14	(0)
2020–2021	San Telmo	8	(1)
2021	Temperley	9	(0)
2022	General Caballero JLM	5	(0)
2022	Deportivo Lara	4	(0)
2023	San Telmo	25	(0)
2024	Chaco For Ever	3	(0)
2024–2025	Ciudad Bolívar	8	(0)
2025	Argentino (Chacabuco)		
2025–	Ferro (GP)		
- * Club domestic league appearances and goals as of 11:38, 10 January 2026 (UTC)

Santiago Enrique Bustos (born 25 March 1998) is an Argentine professional footballer who plays as a left-back for Ferro (GP) in the Torneo Regional Federal Amateur of Argentina.

== Career ==
Bustos began his career in Primera B Metropolitana with All Boys, after he joined their youth system from San Lorenzo in 2018. He made his professional debut during a 0–0 draw with Flandria on 21 April 2019, as he played the full duration under manager Pablo Solchaga.

He also played in San Telmo, Temperley, General Caballero JLM from Paraguay, Deportivo Lara from Venezuela, Chaco For Ever, Ciudad Bolívar, and Argentino (Chacabuco), he signed with Ferro (GP) in August 2025 to face the 2025/2026 Torneo Regional Federal Amateur.

== Career statistics ==
As of 24 April 2019.

Appearances and goals by club, season and competition
Club	Season	League			Cup		League Cup		Continental		Other		Total	
Club	Season	Division	Apps	Goals	Apps	Goals	Apps	Goals	Apps	Goals	Apps	Goals	Apps	Goals
All Boys	2018–19	Primera B Metropolitana	9	0	0	0	—		—		0	0	9	0
Career total			14	0	0	0	—		—		0	0	14	0
