= Miguel Ángel Romero =

Argentine footballer

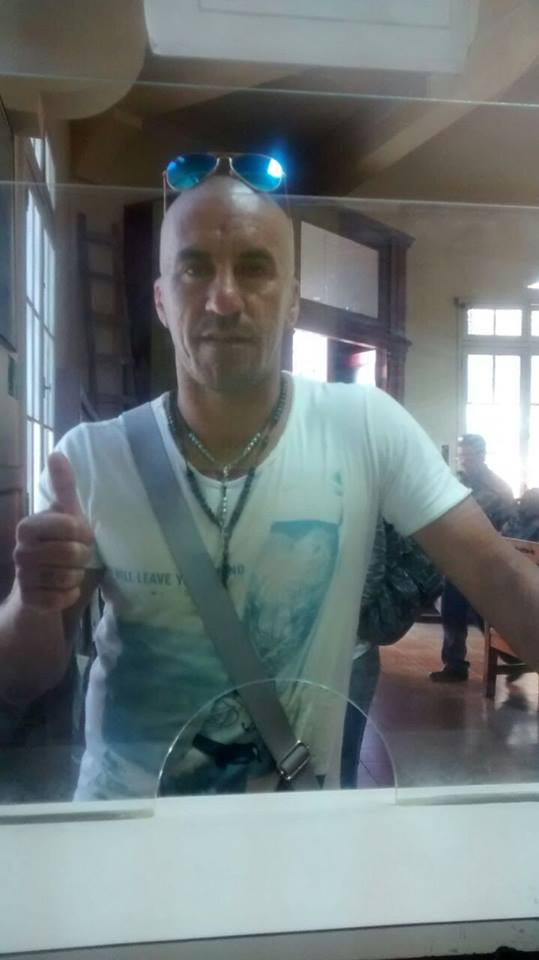
- Romero in 2014

Personal information
- Full name: Miguel Ángel Romero Duarte
- Date of birth: 2 May 1975 (age 51)
- Place of birth: Buenos Aires, Argentina
- Height: 1.76 m (5 ft 9 in)
- Position: Central midfielder

Youth career
- Newell's Old Boys

Senior career*
Years	Team	Apps	(Gls)
1997–1998	Argentino de Rosario	?	(?)
1998–1999	Tigre	?	(?)
1999	Cobreloa	?	(?)
2000	Everton	?	(?)
2000–2002	Unión San Felipe	?	(?)
2003	Colo-Colo	?	(?)
2004–2005	Coquimbo Unido	?	(?)
2006–2008	Audax Italiano	105	(14)
2009–2010	Coquimbo Unido	23	(1)
2011	Curicó Unido	32	(4)
2012	Lota Schwager	14	(0)
2012–2014	Magallanes	62	(3)
- * Club domestic league appearances and goals as of 25 March 2012

Miguel Ángel Romero Duarte (born 2 May 1975) is a former Argentine footballer.
