= Urandi =

Coordinates: 14.7708°S 42.655°W

- Municipality
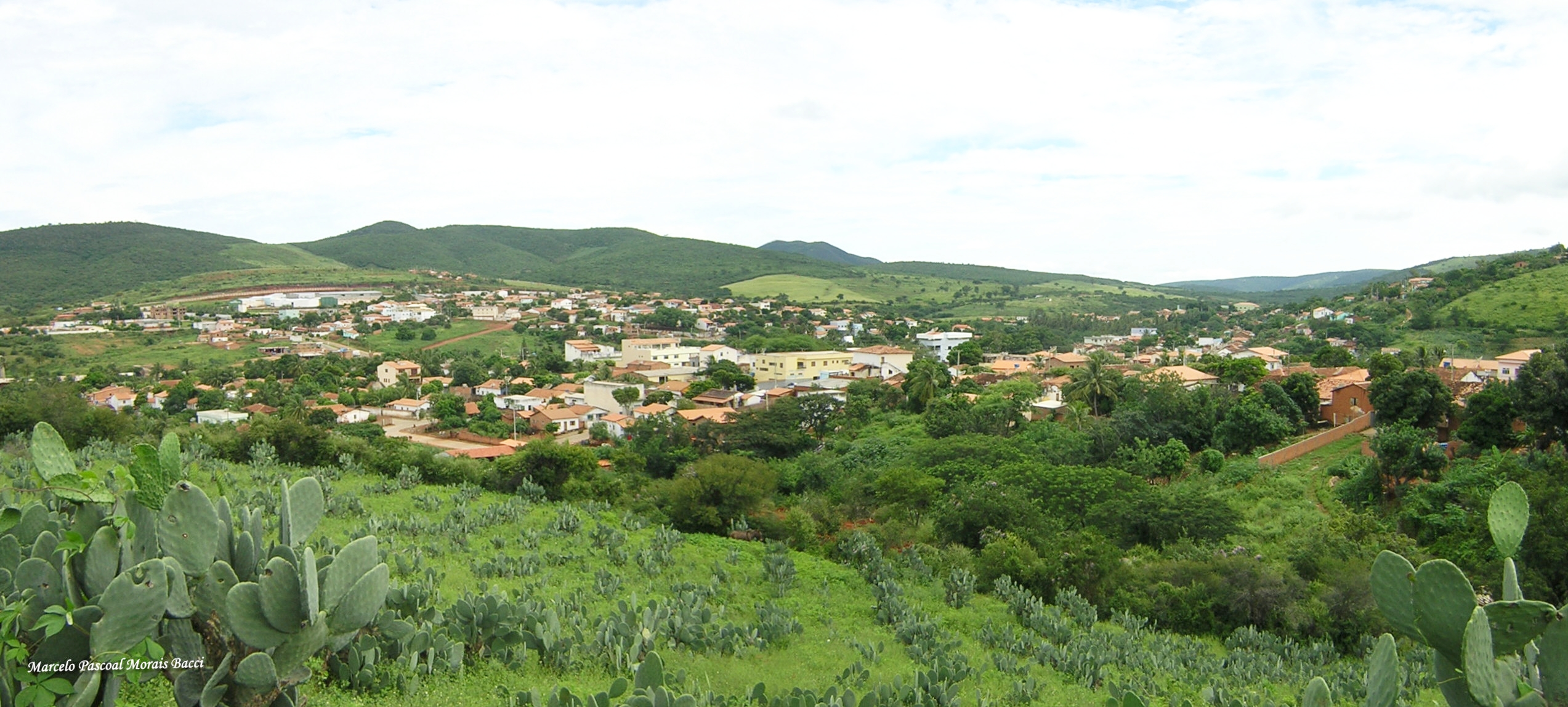
- View of Urandi

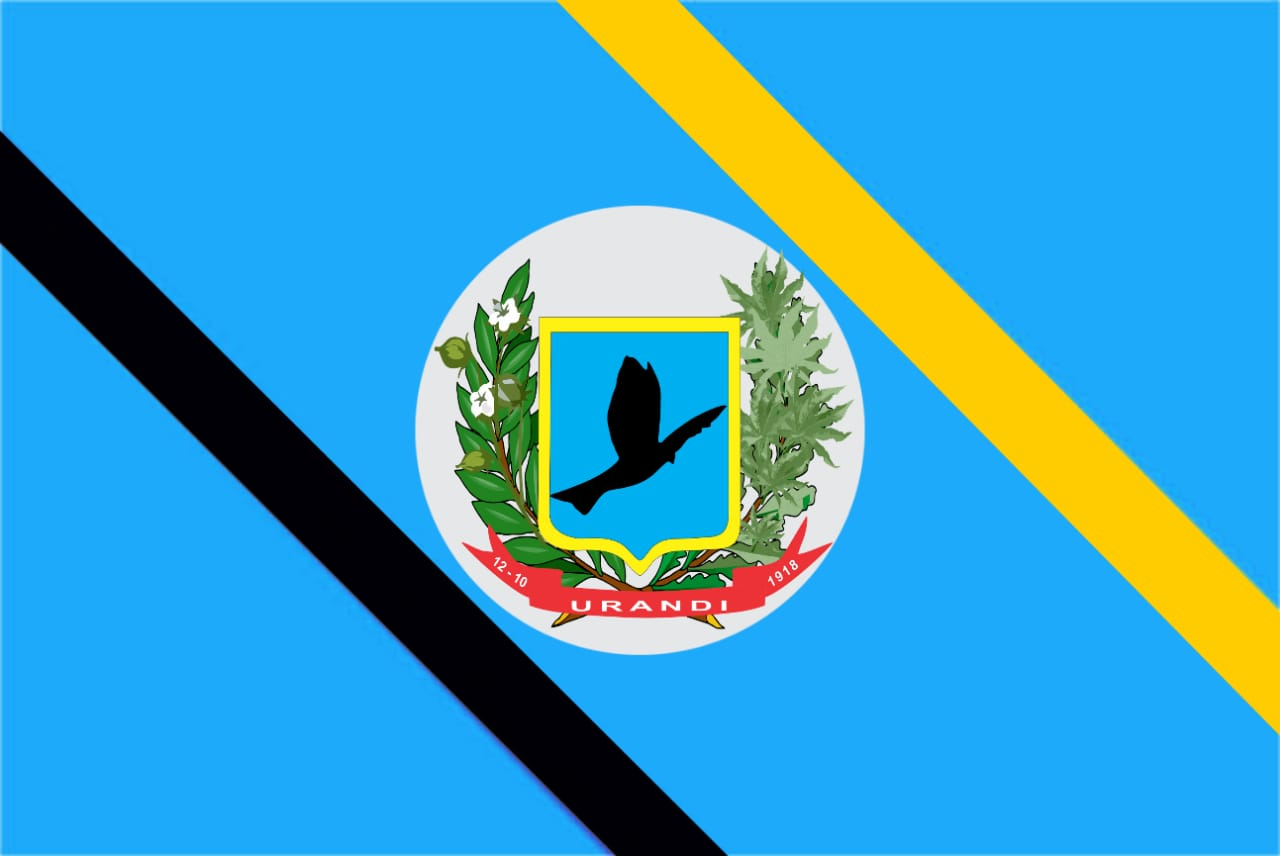
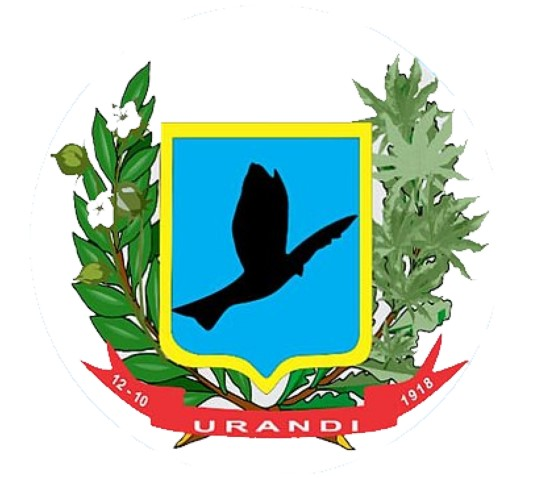
- Flag Coat of arms
- Interactive map of Urandi
- Country: Brazil
- Region: Nordeste
- State: Bahia

Population (2020)
  - Total: 16,670
- Time zone: UTC−3 (BRT)

Urandi is a municipality in the state of Bahia in the North-East region of Brazil.

== See also ==
- List of municipalities in Bahia
