= Sálvio Spínola =

Brazilian football referee

Sálvio Spinola
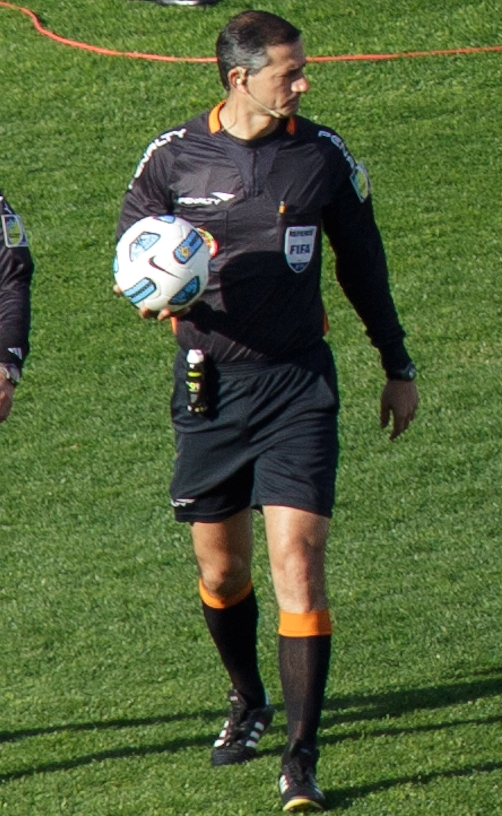
- Sálvio Spínola in 2011
- Full name: Sálvio Spinola Fagundes Filho
- Born: 14 September 1968 (age 58); Urandi, Bahia, Brazil
- Height: 1.84 m (6 ft 1/2 in)
- Other occupation: Full-time referee lawyer

Domestic
Years	League	Role
1999–2013	Série A	Referee

International
Years	League	Role
2005–2013	FIFA listed	Referee

Sálvio Spínola Fagundes Filho (born 14 September 1968 in Urandi, Bahia) is a former Brazilian football referee.

== Refereeing career ==
Sálvio was born in the state of Bahia, but has lived in capital city of São Paulo since the age of 1. He first showed interest in refereeing in 1992, when he signed up for the refereeing course in the Federação Paulista de Futebol. Since then, he has been a São Paulo State referee for Brazilian competitions.

He has been an International FIFA referee since 2005 and took charge of numerous Copa Libertadores and Copa Sudamericana matches since then. He was also selected for the 2007 FIFA U-17 World Cup in South Korea where he officiated six matches including the semifinal between Spain and Ghana. Fagundes also officiated in 2010 and 2014 World Cup qualifiers.

Following the retirement of fellow countryman Carlos Eugênio Simon he finally secured his maiden Copa América appointment in 2011, where he went on to officiate the final between Uruguay and Paraguay.

As of July 2013, Fagundes is no longer listed on the FIFA list for Brazil, because of the FIFA international age limit of 45.

Fagundes is also a lawyer and economist. After his retirement as international referee, he has acted as a pundit for Brazilian channel ESPN Brasil.

== Statistics ==
=== Série A ===
Year	Games	Total (yellow card)	(yellow card) per game	Total (red card)	(red card) per game
1999	7	33	4.71	6	0.85
2000	7	33	4.71	5	0.71
2001	4	18	4.50	1	0.25
2002	5	28	5.60	1	0.20
2003	20	115	5.75	8	0.40
2004	15	94	6.26	7	0.46
2005	17	72	4.23	9	0.52
2006	19	98	5.15	7	0.36
2007	13	63	4.84	3	0.23
2008	18	96	5.33	10	0.55
2009	17	106	6.23	5	0.29
2010	17	80	4.70	4	0.23
Overall	159	836	5.25	66	0.41
