= Fernando Fadeuille =

Uruguayan footballer (born 1974)

Personal information
- Full name: Fernando Fadeuille Carvallo
- Date of birth: 10 May 1974 (age 52)
- Place of birth: Montevideo, Uruguay
- Height: 1.75 m (5 ft 9 in)
- Position: Midfielder

Senior career*
Years	Team	Apps	(Gls)
1996–2000	Defensor Sporting		
2001–2002	Montevideo Wanderers		
2004–2005	Apollon Limassol		
2005–2006	Peñarol		
2006	Liverpool Montevideo		
2006–2007	Defensor Sporting		
2007	Millonarios		
2008–2010	Montevideo Wanderers	3	(0)
- * Club domestic league appearances and goals

Fernando Fadeuille Carvallo (born 10 May 1974) is a French-Uruguayan former footballer.
