= Turvo =

Coordinates: 28°55′33″S 49°40′44″W

- Municipality
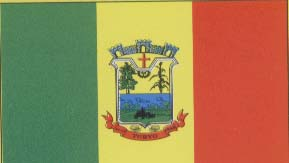
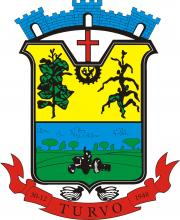
- Flag Coat of arms
- Interactive map of Turvo
- Country: Brazil
- Region: South
- State: Santa Catarina
- Mesoregion: Sul Catarinense
- Established: March 20, 1949

Population (2020)
  - Total: 12,990
- Time zone: UTC -3
- ZIP code: 88930-000
- Area code: 48
- Website: http://turvo.sc.gov.br/home/index.php?

Turvo is a municipality in the state of Santa Catarina in the South region of Brazil. Its main economic activity is Agriculture. Known as the "capital of agricultural mechanization and rice."

== Climate ==
Turvo is classified as Humid subtropical climate (Köppen climate classification: Cfa).

Climate data for Turvo (1976–2005)
Month	Jan	Feb	Mar	Apr	May	Jun	Jul	Aug	Sep	Oct	Nov	Dec	Year
Record high °C (°F)	37.0 (98.6)	38.0 (100.4)	38.0 (100.4)	35.0 (95.0)	33.0 (91.4)	32.0 (89.6)	33.0 (91.4)	35.0 (95.0)	36.0 (96.8)	37.0 (98.6)	37.0 (98.6)	38.0 (100.4)	38.0 (100.4)
Mean daily maximum °C (°F)	29.5 (85.1)	30.1 (86.2)	29.1 (84.4)	26.3 (79.3)	24.1 (75.4)	21.4 (70.5)	21.2 (70.2)	22.2 (72.0)	22.7 (72.9)	24.9 (76.8)	26.8 (80.2)	28.2 (82.8)	25.5 (78.0)
Daily mean °C (°F)	24.8 (76.6)	25.4 (77.7)	24.4 (75.9)	21.1 (70.0)	18.9 (66.0)	16.0 (60.8)	15.6 (60.1)	17.0 (62.6)	17.8 (64.0)	20.0 (68.0)	22.5 (72.5)	23.5 (74.3)	20.6 (69.0)
Mean daily minimum °C (°F)	20.8 (69.4)	21.1 (70.0)	19.7 (67.5)	16.7 (62.1)	13.4 (56.1)	10.6 (51.1)	9.9 (49.8)	11.6 (52.9)	12.9 (55.2)	15.0 (59.0)	18.1 (64.6)	19.3 (66.7)	15.8 (60.4)
Record low °C (°F)	11.0 (51.8)	14.0 (57.2)	11.0 (51.8)	8.0 (46.4)	9.0 (48.2)	6.0 (42.8)	3.0 (37.4)	5.0 (41.0)	5.0 (41.0)	9.0 (48.2)	10.0 (50.0)	10.0 (50.0)	3.0 (37.4)
Average precipitation mm (inches)	224.7 (8.85)	159.3 (6.27)	134.6 (5.30)	73.2 (2.88)	99.1 (3.90)	86.9 (3.42)	78.6 (3.09)	66.8 (2.63)	114.9 (4.52)	125.5 (4.94)	109.1 (4.30)	174.5 (6.87)	1,447.2 (56.97)
Source: Empresa Brasileira de Pesquisa Agropecuária (EMBRAPA)

== List of mayors ==
Since his emancipation from the municipality of Araranguá in 1949, Turvo has successively been directed by:

- Osni Paulino da Silva - 1949
- Abele Bez Batti - 1949 to 1952
- Luiz Maragno - 1952 to 1954
- José Marcon - 1954 to 1959
- Antônio Dandolini - 1959 to 1964
- Sebastião M. de Mattos - 1964 to 1966
- Aldir Schmidt - 1966 to 1970
- Ires Olivo - 1970 to 1973
- Romeu Carlessi - 1973 to 1976
- Ari Pessi - 1976 to 1983
- Adoaldo Otávio Teixeira - 1983 to 1988
- Heriberto Afonso Schmidt - 1989 to 1992
- Ari Pessi - 1992 to 1996
- Heriberto Afonso Schmidt - 1997 to 2004
- José Brina Tramontim - 2005 to 2008
- Ronaldo Carlessi - 2009 to today

(out of date)

=== See also ===
- List of municipalities in Santa Catarina
