= Fernando Brandán (footballer, born 1980) =

Argentine footballer

Personal information
- Full name: Fernando Ariel Brandán
- Date of birth: 15 November 1980 (age 45)
- Place of birth: Salta, Argentina
- Height: 1.69 m (5 ft 7 in)
- Position: Midfielder

Senior career*
Years	Team	Apps	(Gls)
1998–2002	Gimnasia y Tiro de Salta	42	(4)
2002–2004	Central Córdoba	46	(0)
2004	Olimpia	1	(0)
2005	Querétaro	1	(0)
2005	Gimnasia y Tiro de Salta	33	(8)
2006	3 de Febrero	3	(0)
2006–2007	Real Potosí	41	(15)
2008	Provincial Osorno	19	(4)
2009	Panachaiki	24	(3)
2009–2010	Aspropyrgos	26	(9)
2010	Gimnasia y Tiro de Salta	8	(0)
2011	Universitario de Sucre	20	(3)
2011	Alumni	11	(0)
2012–2013	Nacional Potosí	24	(3)
2014	Real Potosí	15	(0)
- * Club domestic league appearances and goals

Fernando Ariel Brandán (born 15 November 1980) is an Argentine former professional footballer who played as a midfielder.
