= Iván Velásquez (footballer) =

Colombian footballer (born 1976)

Iván José Velásquez Wilches (born August 27, 1976 in Cartagena, Colombia), commonly known as Champeta Velásquez, is a Colombian former professional footballer and football coach. He played as a striker and represented several clubs in Colombia, Argentina, Venezuela and Peru.

Velásquez began his professional career with Independiente Santa Fe in 1999. During his playing career, he also represented Deportes Tolima, Atlético Nacional, Quilmes, Atlético Junior, Caracas FC, Deportes Quindío, Once Caldas, Atlético Huila, Mineros de Guayana, Independiente Medellín and Los Caimanes.

One of the most memorable moments of his career came during the 2007 Copa Libertadores, when he scored the winning goal for Caracas FC against River Plate at the Estadio Monumental in Buenos Aires. He also achieved recognition in Colombian football with Deportes Quindío, finishing as joint top scorer of the 2008 Torneo Apertura with 13 goals.

Velásquez ended his professional playing career in 2013 after winning the Peruvian second-division championship with Los Caimanes. According to contemporary reporting, he scored 135 goals during his professional career.

== Coaching career ==
After retiring from professional football, Velásquez remained involved in the sport through youth development and coaching. In 2015, he established a football academy in Ibagué, Colombia, where he worked with young players.

In February 2021, he was appointed coach of Deportes Tolima's under-20 team. Before taking the position, he had worked with youth teams in the Tolima regional football system.

He subsequently worked as an assistant coach to Hubert Bodhert at Independiente Santa Fe and Alianza FC. In October 2024, Alianza FC announced that Velásquez had left the club's coaching staff by mutual agreement.

In July 2026, Velásquez joined the coaching staff of Deportes Tolima as an assistant to head coach Sebastián Oliveros.

== Teams ==
- (Colombia) Independiente Santa Fe 1999
- (Colombia) Deportes Tolima 2000-2001
- (Colombia) Atlético Nacional 2001-2003
- (Colombia) Deportes Tolima 2004
- (Argentina) Quilmes 2005
- (Colombia) Atlético Junior 2006
- (Venezuela) Caracas FC 2006-2007
- (Colombia) Deportes Quindío 2007-2008
- (Colombia) Once Caldas 2008
- (Colombia) Atlético Huila 2009-2010
- (Venezuela) Mineros 2011
- (Colombia) Independiente Medellín 2011–2012
- (Colombia) Deportes Quindío 2012
- (Peru) Los Caimanes 2013

== Titles ==
- (Venezuela) Caracas FC 2006-2007 (Venezuelan Primera División Championship)

== Honours ==
- (Colombia) Deportes Quindío 2008 (Top Scorer Torneo Apertura Primera A Championship)
