= 2007 Campeonato Brasileiro Série A =

Campeonato Brasileiro Série A
- Season: 2007
- Champions: São Paulo; 5th Campeonato Brasileiro title 5th Brazilian title
- Relegated: Corinthians; Paraná; Juventude; América-RN
- Copa Libertadores: São Paulo; Santos; Flamengo; Fluminense; Cruzeiro
- Copa Sudamericana: São Paulo; Grêmio; Palmeiras; Atlético Mineiro; Botafogo; Vasco da Gama; Internacional; Atlético Paranaense
- Matches: 380
- Goals: 1,047 (2.76 per match)
- Top goalscorer: Josiel (20 goals)
- Biggest home win: São Paulo 6 – 0 Paraná
- Biggest away win: Figueirense 3 - 6 Atlético-PR
- Highest scoring: Figueirense 3 - 6 Atlético-PR
- Average attendance: 14,132

The 2007 Campeonato Brasileiro Série A was the 51st edition of the Campeonato Brasileiro Série A. It began on May 12, 2007, and ended on December 2, 2007.

== Format ==
The format was identical to the 2006 edition. 20 teams competed, each team playing the other 19 twice in a double round-robin format (one home game, one away). At the season finale, São Paulo were the champions.

== Calendar ==
Several teams had their attentions divided between other tournaments over the same duration:

- Copa do Brasil 2007 - Fluminense defeated Figueirense in the finals. 2-1 Aggregate Score.
- Copa Libertadores 2007 - Grêmio defeated by Boca Juniors-ARG in the finals. 5-0 Aggregate Score.
- Copa Sudamericana 2007 - São Paulo, Vasco da Gama; Botafogo; Goiás, Figueirense, Atlético Paranaense, Cruzeiro and Corinthians were eliminated.

== Standings ==
Pos	Team	Pld	W	D	L	GF	GA	GD	Pts	Qualification or relegation
1	São Paulo	38	23	8	7	55	19	+36	77	Qualified for both Copa Libertadores 2008 and Copa Sudamericana 2008
2	Santos	38	19	5	14	57	47	+10	62	Qualified for the Copa Libertadores 2008
3	Flamengo	38	17	10	11	55	49	+6	61	Qualified for the Copa Libertadores 2008
4	Fluminense	38	16	13	9	57	39	+18	61	Qualified for the Copa Libertadores 2008 by winning the Copa do Brasil 2007
5	Cruzeiro	38	18	6	14	73	58	+15	60	Qualified for the Copa Libertadores 2008
6	Grêmio	38	17	7	14	44	43	+1	58	Qualified for the Copa Sudamericana 2008
7	Palmeiras	38	16	10	12	48	47	+1	58	Qualified for the Copa Sudamericana 2008
8	Atlético Mineiro	38	15	10	13	63	51	+12	55	Qualified for the Copa Sudamericana 2008
9	Botafogo	38	14	13	11	62	58	+4	55	Qualified for the Copa Sudamericana 2008
10	Vasco da Gama	38	15	9	14	58	47	+11	54	Qualified for the Copa Sudamericana 2008
11	Internacional	38	15	9	14	49	44	+5	54	Qualified for the Copa Sudamericana 2008
12	Atlético Paranaense	38	14	12	12	51	50	+1	54	Qualified for the Copa Sudamericana 2008
13	Figueirense	38	14	11	13	57	56	+1	53	
14	Sport	38	14	9	15	54	55	−1	51	
15	Náutico	38	14	7	17	66	63	+3	49	
16	Goiás	38	13	6	19	49	62	−13	45	
17	Corinthians	38	10	14	14	40	50	−10	44	Relegated to 2008 Série B
18	Juventude	38	11	8	19	43	65	−22	41	Relegated to 2008 Série B
19	Paraná	38	11	8	19	42	64	−22	41	Relegated to 2008 Série B
20	América-RN	38	4	5	29	24	80	−56	17	Relegated to 2008 Série B

Source: "Campeonato Brasileiro 2007 - UOL Esporte". UOL Esporte. Archived from the original on 9 November 2026.

== Results table ==
Home \ Away	ARN	CAM	CAP	BOT	COR	CRU	FIG	FLA	FLU	GOI	GRE	INT	JUV	NAU	PAL	PAR	SAN	SPL	SPO	VAS
América-RN		0–1^{(R31)}	2–1^{(R13)}	1–1^{(R35)}	1–2^{(R05)}	1–2^{(R19)}	0–1^{(R03)}	0–1^{(R33)}	0–1^{(R07)}	0–3^{(R08)}	0–3^{(R37)}	1–2^{(R11)}	0–3^{(R23)}	1–5^{(R17)}	0–0^{(R28)}	3–2^{(R29)}	1–4^{(R21)}	0–1^{(R15)}	1–1^{(R25)}	0–1^{(R01)}
Atlético Mineiro	4–2^{(R12)}		1–1^{(R04)}	1–2^{(R21)}	5–2^{(R22)}	3–4^{(R26)}	4–1^{(R06)}	1–1^{(R09)}	3–0^{(R14)}	4–1^{(R37)}	0–1^{(R10)}	2–2^{(R27)}	4–1^{(R36)}	2–1^{(R01)}	1–2^{(R19)}	0–0^{(R34)}	1–2^{(R16)}	0–0^{(R24)}	3–1^{(R30)}	1–0^{(R32)}
Atlético Paranaense	2–0^{(R32)}	1–0^{(R23)}		2–0^{(R29)}	2–2^{(R16)}	2–2^{(R14)}	1–1^{(R20)}	2–0^{(R18)}	1–1^{(R06)}	0–3^{(R05)}	2–0^{(R34)}	2–1^{(R02)}	4–0^{(R12)}	1–1^{(R09)}	2–1^{(R26)}	2–1^{(R27)}	0–1^{(R03)}	2–1^{(R38)}	0–0^{(R36)}	1–0^{(R30)}
Botafogo	4–2^{(R16)}	2–1^{(R02)}	2–0^{(R10)}		2–3^{(R07)} (Note: played on August 15, instead of original matchday, June 23)	4–1^{(R34)}	1–0^{(R38)}	1–1^{(R22)}	0–2^{(R27)}	0–3^{(R28)}	3–0^{(R04)}	1–1^{(R20)}	3–1^{(R14)}	3–1^{(R06)}	1–1^{(R24)}	3–2^{(R36)}	1–2^{(R30)}	0–2^{(R18)}	3–1^{(R32)}	4–0^{(R12)} (Note: played on June 14, instead of original matchday, July 18)
Corinthians	1–0^{(R24)}	0–0^{(R03)}	2–2^{(R35)}	0–1^{(R26)}		0–3^{(R21)}	2–1^{(R33)}	2–2^{(R15)}	1–1^{(R10)}	1–0^{(R17)}	2–1^{(R19)}	1–1^{(R31)}	1–0^{(R01)}	0–3^{(R13)}	0–1^{(R08)}	0–0^{(R06)}	2–0^{(R23)}	1–1^{(R11)}	1–2^{(R28)}	0–1^{(R37)}
Cruzeiro	2–0^{(R38)}	4–2^{(R07)}	1–1^{(R33)}	3–2^{(R15)}	0–3^{(R02)}		1–2^{(R28)}	3–1^{(R35)}	4–2^{(R20)}	2–1^{(R11)}	2–0^{(R25)}	3–2^{(R17)}	2–3^{(R05)}	2–2^{(R31)}	5–0^{(R23)}	3–4^{(R03)}	0–1^{(R29)}	1–2^{(R13)}	2–0^{(R18)}	3–1^{(R08)}
Figueirense	3–1^{(R22)}	2–1^{(R25)}	3–6^{(R01)}	1–1^{(R19)}	2–2^{(R14)}	2–1^{(R09)}		4–0^{(R05)}	0–2^{(R34)}	2–1^{(R04)}	1–0^{(R16)}	0–0^{(R29)}	4–1^{(R26)}	2–0^{(R37)}	1–2^{(R21)}	4–0^{(R30)}	1–0^{(R32)}	0–0^{(R08)}	0–1^{(R12)}	3–3^{(R36)}
Flamengo	3–1^{(R14)}	1–0^{(R28)}	2–0^{(R37)}	2–2^{(R03)}	2–1^{(R34)}	3–1^{(R16)} (Note: played on September 12, instead of original matchday, August 2)	4–1^{(R24)}		0–2^{(R30)}	3–1^{(R21)}	2–0^{(R32)}	2–2^{(R06)}	4–0^{(R08)} (Note: played on August 23, instead of original matchday, June 30)	2–1^{(R19)}	2–4^{(R01)}	1–2^{(R12)}	1–0^{(R36)}	1–0^{(R29)}	1–0^{(R23)}	1–1^{(R26)}
Fluminense	2–0^{(R26)}	1–1^{(R33)}	2–0^{(R25)}	1–2^{(R08)}	1–1^{(R29)}	2–2^{(R01)}	1–1^{(R15)}	0–1^{(R11)} (Note: played on August 16, instead of original matchday, July 14)		3–0^{(R13)}	1–1^{(R21)}	3–0^{(R03)}	3–2^{(R37)}	2–1^{(R35)}	0–1^{(R17)}	0–0^{(R09)}	3–0^{(R19)}	1–1^{(R31)}	3–0^{(R05)}	1–1^{(R23)}
Goiás	1–1^{(R27)}	3–2^{(R18)}	2–3^{(R24)}	1–1^{(R09)}	1–1^{(R36)}	0–0^{(R30)}	2–1^{(R23)}	1–3^{(R02)}	5–3^{(R32)}		0–0^{(R12)}	2–1^{(R38)}	3–1^{(R03)}	0–3^{(R26)}	3–1^{(R06)}	2–0^{(R16)}	1–0^{(R14)}	0–0^{(R20)}	3–2^{(R10)}	2–3^{(R34)}
Grêmio	3–0^{(R18)}	2–2^{(R29)}	1–1^{(R15)}	3–0^{(R23)}	1–1^{(R38)}	0–2^{(R06)}	1–2^{(R35)}	1–0^{(R13)}	2–0^{(R02)}	2–1^{(R31)}		1–0^{(R26)}	3–1^{(R09)}	4–3^{(R33)}	1–1^{(R11)}	2–0^{(R20)}	1–0^{(R27)}	0–2^{(R17)}	1–0^{(R03)}	3–1^{(R24)}
Internacional	2–0^{(R30)}	1–1^{(R08)}	1–0^{(R21)}	2–3^{(R01)}	3–0^{(R12)}	1–0^{(R36)}	2–1^{(R10)}	3–0^{(R25)}	1–4^{(R22)}	1–0^{(R19)}	0–2^{(R07)}		3–0^{(R32)}	2–0^{(R04)}	2–1^{(R37)}	2–0^{(R14)}	1–0^{(R05)}	1–2^{(R28)}	0–0^{(R34)}	0–2^{(R16)}
Juventude	3–0^{(R04)}	1–2^{(R17)}	0–0^{(R31)}	1–1^{(R33)}	2–2^{(R20)}	1–0^{(R24)}	1–1^{(R07)}	2–2^{(R27)}	0–0^{(R18)}	2–0^{(R22)}	1–2^{(R28)}	2–0^{(R13)}		1–1^{(R11)}	1–1^{(R15)}	1–2^{(R02)}	0–2^{(R06)}	2–0^{(R35)}	2–1^{(R38)}	2–0^{(R10)}
Náutico	4–0^{(R36)}	0–1^{(R20)}	5–0^{(R28)}	4–1^{(R25)}	1–0^{(R32)}	1–4^{(R12)}	4–1^{(R18)}	1–0^{(R38)}	0–0^{(R16)}	0–2^{(R07)}	0–2^{(R14)}	1–1^{(R23)}	4–1^{(R30)}		0–1^{(R10)}	4–4^{(R05)}	1–2^{(R34)}	1–0^{(R02)}	2–0^{(R27)}	2–2^{(R03)}
Palmeiras	2–0^{(R09)}	1–3^{(R38)}	0–2^{(R07)}	1–1^{(R05)}	1–0^{(R27)}	1–3^{(R04)}	2–1^{(R02)}	2–1^{(R20)}	1–0^{(R36)}	2–0^{(R25)}	2–0^{(R30)}	1–1^{(R18)}	0–1^{(R34)}	2–1^{(R29)}		3–0^{(R32)}	2–2^{(R12)}	0–1^{(R22)}	1–2^{(R16)}	3–2^{(R14)}
Paraná	0–1^{(R10)}	1–3^{(R15)}	2–2^{(R08)}	0–0^{(R17)}	1–0^{(R25)}	1–2^{(R22)}	1–2^{(R11)}	0–1^{(R31)}	3–1^{(R28)}	1–0^{(R35)}	3–0^{(R01)}	1–0^{(R33)}	3–1^{(R21)}	2–4^{(R24)}	1–0^{(R13)}		2–3^{(R37)}	0–1^{(R04)}	1–0^{(R07)}	0–0^{(R19)}
Santos	2–3^{(R02)}	2–2^{(R35)}	3–1^{(R22)}	3–0^{(R11)}	1–1^{(R04)}	4–1^{(R10)}	3–1^{(R13)}	3–0^{(R17)}	2–4^{(R38)}	3–0^{(R33)}	0–0^{(R08)}	2–1^{(R24)}	1–0^{(R25)}	1–2^{(R15)}	1–1^{(R31)}	2–0^{(R18)}		0–2^{(R07)}	2–0^{(R20)}	1–0^{(R28)}
São Paulo	3–0^{(R34)}	0–1^{(R05)}	2–0^{(R19)}	2–2^{(R37)}	0–1^{(R30)}	1–0^{(R32)}	2–0^{(R27)}	0–0^{(R10)}	0–1^{(R12)}	2–0^{(R01)}	1–0^{(R36)}	1–0^{(R09)}	3–1^{(R16)}	5–0^{(R21)}	0–0^{(R03)}	6–0^{(R23)}	2–1^{(R26)}		3–1^{(R14)}	2–0^{(R06)}
Sport	2–2^{(R06)}	2–0^{(R11)}	3–2^{(R17)}	3–3^{(R13)}	2–1^{(R09)}	1–0^{(R37)}	0–0^{(R31)}	2–2^{(R04)}	0–2^{(R24)}	4–0^{(R29)}	2–0^{(R22)}	1–5^{(R15)}	3–0^{(R19)}	4–1^{(R08)}	3–1^{(R35)}	3–1^{(R26)}	4–1^{(R01)}	1–2^{(R33)}		0–0^{(R21)}
Vasco da Gama	2–0^{(R20)}	4–0^{(R13)}	1–0^{(R11)}	2–1^{(R31)}	2–0^{(R18)}	0–2^{(R27)}	2–2^{(R17)}	1–2^{(R07)} (Note: played on October 18, instead of original matchday, June 24)	1–1^{(R04)}	4–1^{(R15)}	4–0^{(R05)}	1–2^{(R35)}	0–1^{(R29)}	4–1^{(R22)}	2–2^{(R33)}	3–0^{(R38)}	4–0^{(R09)}	0–2^{(R25)}	3–1^{(R02)}	

Legend: Blue = home team win; Yellow = draw; Red = away team win.

== Top goalscorers ==
Scorer	Goals	Team
(Brazil) Josiel	20	Paraná
(Uruguay) Acosta	19	Náutico
(Brazil) Kléber Pereira	16	Santos
(Brazil) Dodô	15	Botafogo
(Brazil) Leandro Amaral	14	Vasco da Gama
(Brazil) Carlinhos Bala	13	Sport
(Brazil) Paulo Baier	13	Goiás

== Stadia ==
Team	Stadium	Capacity
América-RN	Machadão	52,000
Atlético Mineiro	Mineirão	85,000
Atlético-PR	Kyocera Arena	32,864
Botafogo	Engenhão	45,000
Corinthians	Pacaembu	37,500
Cruzeiro	Mineirão	85,000
Figueirense	Orlando Scarpelli	19,908
Flamengo	Maracanã	97,000
Fluminense	Maracanã	97,000
Goiás	Serra Dourada	54,048
Grêmio	Olímpico	51,081
Internacional	Beira-Rio	58,306
Juventude	Alfredo Jaconi	30,519
Náutico	Aflitos	30,000
Palmeiras	Palestra Itália	35,000
Paraná	Vila Capanema	20,083
Santos	Vila Belmiro	20,120
São Paulo	Morumbi	70,000
Sport	Ilha do Retiro	45,500
Vasco da Gama	São Januário	36,273

== Doping case ==
On 8 July, Botafogo's player Dodô was caught on a doping exam. On 24 July, it was confirmed that he was banned for 120 days. In a new case, on 2 August, the player was acquitted.
