= Santiago Fernández (footballer, born 1985) =

Mexican footballer

Personal information
- Full name: Santiago Fernández Fernández
- Date of birth: 7 March 1985 (age 41)
- Place of birth: Mexico City, Mexico
- Height: 1.85 m (6 ft 1 in)
- Position: Forward

Senior career*
Years	Team	Apps	(Gls)
2003	América	9	(5)
2004–2005	Barcelona B	10	(7)
2006–2007	América	35	(11)
2008–2009	Toluca	21	(10)
2009	Puebla	6	(0)
Total		81	(24)

International career
2005	Mexico U20	3	(0)
2006	Mexico U23	6	(1)
2007	Mexico	1	(0)
- * Club domestic league appearances and goals

Santiago Fernández Fernández (born 7 March 1985) is a Mexican former football forward who last played for Club Puebla in Liga MX. Once hailed as one of Club América's (and Mexico's) top footballing prospects, Fernández disappeared from the sport after a brief spell in FC Barcelona's youth squad, only to resurface a few years later for América.

== Club career ==
His talent was soon recognized by coach Manuel Lapuente and promoted him to the senior squad in late 2002. His professional debut came during the Clausura 2003 season, on 25 January 2003; in a game against San Luis. After a few more appearances as a late substitute, Lapuente inserted Fernández in the starting lineup of a game against Club Atlas in which he scored, becoming one of the five youngest players to score for Club America in its history.

Soon after, Dutch coach Leo Beenhakker took over the reins of the club and relegated Fernández to the bench. Following an Apertura 2003, Santiago decided to try his luck abroad, signing with FC Barcelona B a four-year deal.

At FC Barcelona, Fernández had limited play time. In 2006, after a postseason loss to Tigres UANL in the Apertura 2005 tournament and a disappointing start to the Clausura 2006 season, Manuel Lapuente made his way back into the head coaching position at América. Immediately, Lapuente sought out Fernández and convinced the young striker to play once more for América. Santiago showed no signs of rust, scoring in a CONCACAF Champions Cup quarterfinal match against Jamaica's Portmore United, which América won 5–2. Fernández also participated in the Mexico league's Clausura 2006 season for the Águilas.

After the off-season shakeup that saw strikers Kléber Boas and Aarón Padilla shipped out to other clubs, and signees Vicente Matías Vuoso and Salvador Cabañas join the team, Fernández was primed to secure a regular spot in the team's lineup, under new coach Luis Fernando Tena. América under the leadership of Tena suffered; he was fired. Fernández saw little playing time, although coming off the bench most games. With new coach Daniel Brailovsky, Fernández played less. The media reported that there was a feud between the two. Before the 2008 Clasura started, Fernández left for Toluca.

Santiago joined Club Puebla for the 2009 season, in hopes of helping the team win the league, but six months later he announced that his football career was over.

== International career ==
Fernández was selected to represent his country at the 2005 Under-20 World Cup qualifying tournament, in which Mexico failed to advance to the main event, suffering two defeats and drawing once.
