= Alex del Castillo =

Colombian footballer (born 1977)

Personal information
- Full name: Alexander Del Castillo Molina
- Date of birth: March 14, 1977 (age 49)
- Place of birth: Cali, Colombia
- Height: 1.85 m (6 ft 1 in)
- Position: Midfielder

Team information
- Current team: Boyacá Chicó
- Number: 19

Youth career
- Atlético Junior

Senior career*
Years	Team	Apps	(Gls)
1998–2002	América de Cali		
1999	→ Deportes Quindío (loan)		
2001	→ Millonarios (loan)		
2001	→ Real Cartagena (loan)		
2003	Cortulua		
2004	Bucaramanga		
2004	ESPOLI		
2006	Deportivo Pasto		
2007	Cúcuta Deportivo		
2008	Junior		
2009	Deportivo Pasto		
2009	América de Cali		
2010	Deportivo Pereira		
2010	Millonarios		
2011	Independiente Rivadavia		
2011	América de Cali		
2012–	Boyacá Chicó		
- * Club domestic league appearances and goals as of 21:23, February 20, 2012 (UTC)

Alexander Del Castillo Molina (born March 14, 1977) is a Colombian footballer who currently plays for Boyacá Chicó F.C. as a midfielder.

== Clubs ==
Club	Country	Year
América de Cali	Colombia	1998
Deportes Quindío	Colombia	1999
Millonarios	Colombia	2000–2001
Real Cartagena	Colombia	2001–2002
Cortuluá	Colombia	2003
Atlético Bucaramanga	Colombia	2004
Espoli	Ecuador	2004–2005
Deportivo Pasto	Colombia	2006
Cúcuta Deportivo	Colombia	2007
Junior	Colombia	2008
Deportivo Pasto	Colombia	2009
América de Cali	Colombia	2009
Deportivo Pereira	Colombia	2010
Millonarios	Colombia	2010
América de Cali	Colombia	2011
Boyacá Chico	Colombia	2012

== Honors ==
- Champions Colombian Primera A, 2006 Deportivo Cúcuta
- Semi-finalist of Copa Libertories with Cúcuta in 2007
