= Josiel (footballer, born 1980) =

Brazilian footballer

Personal information
- Full name: Josiel da Rocha
- Date of birth: 7 August 1980 (age 46)
- Place of birth: Rodeio Bonito, RS, Brazil
- Height: 1.75 m (5 ft 9 in)
- Position: Striker

Team information
- Current team: Cuiabá

Youth career
- 1999–2001: Inter Santa Maria-RS

Senior career*
Years	Team	Apps	(Gls)
2001–2002	Pelotas	-	(-)
2002–2004	Inter Santa Maria-RS	-	(-)
2005	São José-RS	-	(-)
2005–2006	Juventude	17	(6)
2006	Brasiliense	-	(-)
2007	Paraná	45	(26)
2008–2010	Al-Wahda	-	(-)
2008–2009	→ Flamengo (loan)	10	(2)
2009	→ Chiapas (loan)	8	(0)
2010–2011	Atlético Goianiense	7	(1)
2011	Paysandu	10	(3)
2012	Macaé		
2012	Cuiabá		
2014	Inter Santa Maria-RS		
- * Club domestic league appearances and goals

Josiel da Rocha (born 7 August 1980, in Rodeio Bonito, RS), or simply Josiel, is a Brazilian striker.

== Career ==
He was the top scorer in the 2007 Brazilian Série A, with 20 goals, when played for the Paraná Clube. He possesses good dribbling and finishing ability. On 19 August 2008, he joined Brazilian Série A club Flamengo.

On 25 March 2009, Josiel scored his first hat trick playing for Flamengo in a 4–2 win against Madureira in the 2009 Rio de Janeiro State League. Three days later he scored another two goals, this time against Resende in a 4–0 win, for the same competition. He has played for Flamengo on loan from Al-Wahda and signed on 17 July 2009 a loan contract with Chiapas. He made his first appearance with Jaguares on 1 August 2009, in their 2–0 loss against Club Toluca. He was released from his contract after serial indiscipline reports.

=== Career statistics ===
(Correct As of May 17, 2011)

Club	Season	State League		Brazilian Série A		Copa do Brasil		Copa Libertadores		Copa Sudamericana		Total	
Club	Season	Apps	Goals	Apps	Goals	Apps	Goals	Apps	Goals	Apps	Goals	Apps	Goals
Paraná Clube	2007	11	6	36	20	-	-	-	-	-	-	45	26
Club total		11	6	36	20	-	-	-	-	-	-	45	26
Flamengo	2008	-	-	5	0	-	-	-	-	-	-	5	0
Flamengo	2009	17	11	5	2	3	0	-	-	-	-	25	13
Club total		17	11	10	2	3	0	-	-	-	-	30	13
Atlético Goianiense	2010	-	-	3	2	-	-	-	-	-	-	3	2
Atlético Goianiense	2011	5	3	-	-	-	-	-	-	-	-	5	3
Club total		5	3	3	2	-	-	-	-	-	-	8	5

according to combined sources on the.

== Honours ==
=== Club ===
Flamengo

- Taça Rio: 2009
- Campeonato Carioca: 2009
- Campeonato Brasileiro: 2009

=== Individual ===
- Campeonato Brasileiro Série A Team of the Year: 2007
- Campeonato Brasileiro Série A top goalscorer: 2007
