= Rubén Selman =

Chilean football referee (1963–2020)

Rubén Selmán
- Full name: Rubén Marcos Selmán Albornoz
- Born: 25 July 1963; Santiago, Chile
- Died: 10 February 2020 (aged 56)
- Other occupation: Football commentator, Politician

Domestic
Years	League	Role
1990s–2008	Chilean Primera División	Referee

International
Years	League	Role
1998–2008	FIFA listed	Referee

Rubén Marcos Selmán Albornoz (25 July 1963 – 10 February 2020) was an association football referee from Chile.

== Refereeing career ==
Selman was born in Santiago, and started refereeing in his twenties at games featured in the minor Chilean divisions. In the 1990s he started in the Primera División de Chile. In 1998, he received his FIFA badge and appeared in CONMEBOL tournaments. He officiated matches in the Copa Libertadores, Copa Mercosur, Copa Sudamericana, international friendlies and South American World Cup qualifiers.

During his career the directors of Colo-Colo were adamant in processing a formal complaint with the domestic club organization Asociación Nacional de Fútbol Profesional de Chile. The directors felt that the institution was being persecuted by Selman after a series of ejections. This followed after player Jorge Valdivia stated that Selman threatened with throwing him out of the game, which he eventually did. According to Selman, Valdivia was red carded after receiving two consecutive yellow cards. The first for a foul and the second after Valdivia ran up to a television camera. Valdivia had gone up to the camera and declared that Selman had threatened him with expulsion.

Ruben Selman's final match was in the home leg of the Chilean club championship game between Colo-Colo and Palestino. He ended his profession by red carding two Palestino players and ejecting Palestino's manager from the match.

== Media career ==
In 2014 he performed as a football commentator for the TV program Fox Sports Radio from Fox Sports Chile. Previously he had worked for Canal del Fútbol (CDF). He also performed as a show business commentator for the TV program Secreto a voces (Open secret) from Mega.

== Political career ==
In 2016, Selman was a candidate to councillor for Quinta Normal as an Independent Democratic Union representative.
