= Henrique Dias (footballer) =

Brazilian footballer (born 1984)

Personal information
- Full name: Henrique Dias de Carvalho
- Date of birth: May 23, 1984 (age 42)
- Place of birth: São Paulo, Brazil
- Height: 1.71 m (5 ft 7 in)
- Position: Centre forward

Team information
- Current team: Botafogo-SP

Youth career
- Coritiba

Senior career*
Years	Team	Apps	(Gls)
2004–2005	Daejeon	17	(2)
2006	Joinville	?	(?)
2006–2007	Paraná	?	(?)
2007–2009	Coritiba	38	(10)
2009–2010	Grêmio Prudente	23	(1)
2010	→ São Caetano (loan)	11	(2)
2011	São Caetano	0	(0)
2011–2012	Mirassol	2	(0)
2012	Ceará	3	(0)
2012	Grêmio Barueri	17	(3)
2013	Vila Nova		
2013–	Botafogo-SP		
- * Club domestic league appearances and goals

Henrique Dias de Carvalho or simply Henrique Dias (born May 23, 1984), is a Brazilian attacking midfielder for Botafogo-SP.

== Contract ==
- 16 April 2007 to 31 December 2008
