= 2013 UEFA European Under-17 Championship qualifying round =

Football tournament qualification stage

The 2013 UEFA European Under-17 Football Championship qualifying round was the first round of qualifications for the 2013 UEFA European Under-17 Football Championship, which was held in Slovakia.

As the host nation, Slovakia qualified automatically for the tournament. The remaining 52 UEFA members were divided into 13 groups of four teams, with each group being contested as a mini-tournament, hosted by one of the group's teams. After all matches have been played, the 13 group winners, 13 group runners-up and the two best third-placed teams advanced to the elite round. The draw for the qualifying round was held on 29 November 2011 in Nyon, with matches set to take place in autumn 2012.

== Seeding ==
Pot A	Pot B
England; Netherlands; Spain; France; Germany; Czech Republic; Turkey; Switzerland; Portugal; Croatia; Greece; Romania; Serbia; Denmark; Italy; Austria; Norway; Republic of Ireland; Belgium; Georgia; Finland; Hungary; Northern Ireland; Poland; Belarus; Scotland	Ukraine; Russia; Luxembourg; Wales; Sweden; Israel; Iceland; Azerbaijan; Estonia; Slovenia; Bosnia and Herzegovina; Montenegro; Bulgaria; Latvia; Kazakhstan; Lithuania; Cyprus; Malta; Faroe Islands; Armenia; Andorra; Albania; Moldova; Macedonia; San Marino; Liechtenstein

== Tiebreakers ==
If two or more teams are equal on points on completion of the group matches, the following criteria are applied to determine the rankings.

1. Higher number of points obtained in the group matches played among the teams in question
2. Superior goal difference from the group matches played among the teams in question
3. Higher number of goals scored in the group matches played among the teams in question
4. If, after applying criteria 1) to 3) to several teams, two teams still have an equal ranking, the criteria 1) to 3) will be reapplied to determine the ranking of these teams. If this procedure does not lead to a decision, criteria 5) and 6) will apply
5. Results of all group matches:
  1. Superior goal difference
  2. Higher number of goals scored
6. Drawing of lots

Additionally, if two teams which have the same number of points and the same number of goals scored and conceded play their last group match against each other and are still equal at the end of that match, their final rankings are determined by the penalty shoot-out and not by the criteria listed above. This procedure is applicable only if a ranking of the teams is required to determine the group winner or the runners-up and the third-placed team.

== Group 1 ==
Pos	Team	Pld	W	D	L	GF	GA	GD	Pts	Qualification
1	Serbia (H)	3	3	0	0	16	0	+16	9	Elite round
2	Belarus	3	2	0	1	6	7	−1	6	Elite round
3	Moldova	3	1	0	2	3	5	−2	3	
4	Armenia	3	0	0	3	0	13	−13	0	

(H) Hosts
25 September 2012
16:30

Belarus	1–0	Moldova
Tarakanov 76'	Report

Gradski stadion, Inđija
Referee: Jonathan Lardot (Belgium)
25 September 2012
16:30

Serbia	5–0	Armenia
Lukić 29'; Belić 41', 46'; Mihajlović 48'; Živković 65'	Report

Stadion FK Srem, Jakovo
Referee: Aleksandrs Anufrijevs (Latvia)

27 September 2012
16:30

Belarus	5–0	Armenia
Bogush 7' (pen.); Valynets 28'; Pavlovets 47'; Kiyko 58', 59'	Report

Stadion FK Srem, Jakovo
Referee: Dennis Antamo (Finland)
27 September 2012
16:30

Moldova	0–4	Serbia
	Report	Belić 18'; Živković 32'; Babić 69'; Radonjić 80+3'

Gradski stadion, Inđija
Referee: Jonathan Lardot (Belgium)

30 September 2012
16:30

Serbia	7–0	Belarus
Živković 9', 46'; Belić 13', 19'; Radonjić 15', 64', 65'	Report

Gradski stadion, Inđija
Referee: Aleksandrs Anufrijevs (Latvia)
30 September 2012
16:30

Armenia	0–3	Moldova
	Report	Bojii 6' (pen.); A. Macrițchii 57'; Bejan 72'

Stadion FK Srem, Jakovo
Referee: Dennis Antamo (Finland)

== Group 2 ==
Pos	Team	Pld	W	D	L	GF	GA	GD	Pts	Qualification
1	Germany	3	3	0	0	23	2	+21	9	Elite round
2	Finland (H)	3	2	0	1	9	8	+1	6	Elite round
3	San Marino	3	0	1	2	1	11	−10	1	
4	Andorra	3	0	1	2	2	14	−12	1	

(H) Hosts
3 October 2012
12:00

Germany	5–0	San Marino
Werner 8'; Multhaup 20', 43'; Avdijaj 28'; Brandt 38'	Report

Saviniemi, Kouvola
Referee: Denis Scherbakov (Belarus)
3 October 2012
17:30

Finland	3–0	Andorra
Jouini 12', 58'; Järvelä 73'	Report

Saviniemi, Kouvola
Referee: Peter Kralović (Slovakia)

5 October 2012
12:00

Andorra	1–10	Germany
Sánchez 31'	Report	Werner 14', 52', 64', 68', 71'; Multhaup 36'; Brandt 40+1'; Foix 57' (o.g.); Avdijaj 59'; Pflücke 69'

Saviniemi, Kouvola
Referee: Markus Hameter (Austria)
5 October 2012
17:30

Finland	5–0	San Marino
Lassas 3'; Jouini 16'; Koukanou 74'; Ojanperä 80'; Muccioli 80+2' (o.g.)	Report

Saviniemi, Kouvola
Referee: Denis Scherbakov (Belarus)

8 October 2012
12:00

Germany	8–1	Finland
Avdijaj 7', 45'; Werner 8', 52'; Brandt 19', 50'; Tikvic 21'; Pflücke 64'	Report	Jääskeläinen 56'

Saviniemi, Kouvola
Referee: Markus Hameter (Austria)
8 October 2012
17:30

San Marino	1–1	Andorra
Tomassini 80'	Report	Sánchez 71'

Kouvolan keskuskenttä, Kouvola
Referee: Peter Kralović (Slovakia)

== Group 3 ==
Pos	Team	Pld	W	D	L	GF	GA	GD	Pts	Qualification
1	Netherlands	3	2	1	0	4	2	+2	7	Elite round
2	Belgium (H)	3	2	0	1	8	2	+6	6	Elite round
3	Latvia	3	1	0	2	2	7	−5	3	
4	Lithuania	3	0	1	2	0	3	−3	1	

(H) Hosts
23 October 2012
16:00

Netherlands	2–1	Latvia
Souza 38'; Van Bruggen 59' (pen.)	Report	Koļesovs 80+4'

RS Waasland, Sint-Niklaas
Attendance: 200
Referee: Danilo Grujić (Serbia)
23 October 2012
19:00

Belgium	2–0	Lithuania
Bakkali 25'; Schrijvers 35'	Report

Thienpontstadion, Oudenaarde
Attendance: 900
Referee: Gunnar Jarl Jónsson (Iceland)

25 October 2012
16:00

Lithuania	0–0	Netherlands
	Report

KFC Eeklo, Eeklo
Attendance: 200
Referee: Ádám Németh (Hungary)
25 October 2012
19:00

Belgium	5–0	Latvia
Bakkali 4', 41'; Isci 22'; Schrijvers 24'; Caenepeel 66'	Report

RS Waasland, Sint-Niklaas
Attendance: 350
Referee: Danilo Grujić (Serbia)

28 October 2012
19:00

Netherlands	2–1	Belgium
Bazoer 64' (pen.); Ben Mohamadi 79'	Report	Musonda 16'

KFC Eeklo, Eeklo
Attendance: 2200
Referee: Ádám Németh (Hungary)
28 October 2012
19:00

Latvia	1–0	Lithuania
Reveliņš 8'	Report

Thienpontstadion, Oudenaarde
Attendance: 100
Referee: Gunnar Jarl Jónsson (Iceland)

== Group 4 ==
The three-way tie-breaker left Spain on third place, and Poland ranked first.

Pos	Team	Pld	W	D	L	GF	GA	GD	Pts	Qualification
1	Poland	3	2	0	1	3	2	+1	6	Elite round
2	Bulgaria (H)	3	2	0	1	6	3	+3	6	Elite round
3	Spain	3	2	0	1	3	1	+2	6	Elite round
4	Azerbaijan	3	0	0	3	1	7	−6	0	

(H) Hosts
19 October 2012
14:00

Poland	2–1	Bulgaria
Tomasiewicz 16'; Stolarski 80+2'	Report	Aytov 31'

Hadzhi Dimitar Stadium, Sliven
Referee: Michael Johansen (Denmark)
19 October 2012
17:00

Spain	2–0	Azerbaijan
Pozo 17'; García 53'	Report

Beroe Stadium, Stara Zagora
Referee: Kevin Clancy (Scotland)

21 October 2012
15:00

Azerbaijan	0–1	Poland
	Report	Stolarski 41'

Hadzhi Dimitar Stadium, Sliven
Referee: Eitan Shemeulevitch (Israel)
21 October 2012
17:00

Spain	0–1	Bulgaria
	Report	Ivaylov 40+2'

Beroe Stadium, Stara Zagora
Referee: Michael Johansen (Denmark)

24 October 2012
15:00

Poland	0–1	Spain
	Report	Chirivella 68' (pen.)

Beroe Stadium, Stara Zagora
Referee: Kevin Clancy (Scotland)
24 October 2012
15:00

Bulgaria	4–1	Azerbaijan
Despodov 3', 50'; Alekov 28', 71'	Report	Khakimov 67'

Hadzhi Dimitar Stadium, Sliven
Referee: Eitan Shemeulevitch (Israel)

== Group 5 ==
Pos	Team	Pld	W	D	L	GF	GA	GD	Pts	Qualification
1	Slovenia	3	2	1	0	2	0	+2	7	Elite round
2	France	3	1	1	1	5	4	+1	4	Elite round
3	Bosnia and Herzegovina (H)	3	1	0	2	3	5	−2	3	
4	Greece	3	0	2	1	3	4	−1	2	

(H) Hosts
24 September 2012
15:00

Greece	0–0	Slovenia
	Report

SRC Slavija, Sarajevo
Referee: Vladimir Kazmenko (Russia)
24 September 2012
15:00

France	3–1	Bosnia and Herzegovina
Cornet 15'; Coman 61'; Coulibaly 73'	Report	Radovac 32'

Asim Ferhatović Hase Stadium, Sarajevo
Referee: Aleksandr Gauzer (Kazakhstan)

26 September 2012
15:00

Greece	1–2	Bosnia and Herzegovina
Niouman 63'	Report	Bašić 31', 48'

Asim Ferhatović Hase Stadium, Sarajevo
Referee: Eiko Saar (Estonia)
26 September 2012
15:00

Slovenia	1–0	France
Ožbolt 42' (pen.)	Report

SRC Slavija, Sarajevo
Referee: Aleksandr Gauzer (Kazakhstan)

29 September 2012
15:00

France	2–2	Greece
Pereira de Sa 49'; Cornet 80+2'	Report	Donis 75'; Saliakas 80'

SRC Slavija, Sarajevo
Referee: Eiko Saar (Estonia)
29 September 2012
15:00

Bosnia and Herzegovina	0–1	Slovenia
	Report	Krivičić 23'

Asim Ferhatović Hase Stadium, Sarajevo
Referee: Vladimir Kazmenko (Russia)

== Group 6 ==
Pos	Team	Pld	W	D	L	GF	GA	GD	Pts	Qualification
1	Switzerland	3	2	1	0	9	2	+7	7	Elite round
2	Austria (H)	3	1	2	0	7	1	+6	5	Elite round
3	Cyprus	3	0	2	1	2	6	−4	2	
4	Faroe Islands	3	0	1	2	1	10	−9	1	

(H) Hosts
10 October 2012
15:00

Switzerland	3–0	Faroe Islands
Pagliuca 1'; Stevic 45'; Trachsel 80+4'	Report

Hall, Hall in Tirol
Referee: Davit Kharitonashvili (Georgia)
10 October 2012
18:00

Austria	0–0	Cyprus
	Report

Sportzentrum Schwaz, Schwaz
Referee: Laurent Kopriwa (Luxembourg)

12 October 2012
15:00

Cyprus	1–5	Switzerland
Katsiati 9'	Report	Kadoic 14' (pen.); Forestal 38'; Bytyqi 64'; Kursner 78'; Ajeti 80'

Sportzentrum Schwaz, Schwaz
Referee: Nerijus Dunauskas (Lithuania)
12 October 2012
20:00

Austria	6–0	Faroe Islands
Pellegrini 8', 38'; Grbić 49', 73'; Eliasen 52' (o.g.); Zitovic 64'	Report

Hall, Hall in Tirol
Referee: Davit Kharitonashvili (Georgia)

15 October 2012
18:00

Switzerland	1–1	Austria
Trachsel 29'	Report	Grbić 51'

Sportzentrum Schwaz, Schwaz
Referee: Nerijus Dunauskas (Lithuania)
15 October 2012
18:00

Faroe Islands	1–1	Cyprus
Hansen 55'	Report	Nikolaou 80+3'

Hall, Hall in Tirol
Referee: Laurent Kopriwa (Luxembourg)

== Group 7 ==
Pos	Team	Pld	W	D	L	GF	GA	GD	Pts	Qualification
1	England	3	3	0	0	6	2	+4	9	Elite round
2	Northern Ireland	3	1	1	1	7	4	+3	4	Elite round
3	Estonia (H)	3	1	1	1	4	4	0	4	Elite round
4	Wales	3	0	0	3	1	8	−7	0	

(H) Hosts
21 October 2012
14:00

Northern Ireland	4–0	Wales
Mullan 9'; Doherty 11'; McDonagh 16' (pen.), 28' (pen.)	Report

Kadriorg Stadium, Tallinn
Referee: Serdar Gözübüyük (Netherlands)
21 October 2012
17:00

England	2–0	Estonia
Green 56'; Collier 73'	Report

Lilleküla Stadium, Tallinn
Referee: Jovan Kaluđerović (Montenegro)

23 October 2012
14:00

England	1–0	Wales
Bryan 35'	Report

Kadriorg Stadium, Tallinn
Referee: Clayton Pisani (Malta)
23 October 2012
17:00

Estonia	1–1	Northern Ireland
Liivak 18'	Report	Lavery 21'

Lilleküla Stadium, Tallinn
Referee: Jovan Kaluđerović (Montenegro)

26 October 2012
15:00

Northern Ireland	2–3	England
McDonagh 18', 71'	Report	Loftus-Cheek 39'; Morris 55' (pen.), 66'

Sportland Arena, Tallinn
Referee: Serdar Gözübüyük (Netherlands)
14 November 2012
17:00

Wales	1–3^{*}	Estonia
Clarke 16'	Report	Sinisalu 40'; Jakovlev 46'; Kuusk 71'

Sportland Arena, Tallinn
Referee: Clayton Pisani (Malta)

^{*} On 26 October 2012, the match between Wales and Estonia played at Sportland Arena in Tallinn was abandoned after twenty-six minutes due to heavy snow. Wales were leading 1–0. The remaining 54 minutes were replayed on 14 November 2012 in Tallinn with exactly the same team selection as in the original match.

== Group 8 ==
Pos	Team	Pld	W	D	L	GF	GA	GD	Pts	Qualification
1	Hungary (H)	3	3	0	0	9	2	+7	9	Elite round
2	Italy	3	2	0	1	7	3	+4	6	Elite round
3	Albania	3	1	0	2	6	2	+4	3	
4	Liechtenstein	3	0	0	3	0	15	−15	0	

(H) Hosts
18 October 2012
13:30

Italy	1–0	Albania
Tutino 80'	Report

Stadion Gyula Grosics, Tatabánya
Referee: Robert Rogers (Ireland)
18 October 2012
13:30

Hungary	5–0	Liechtenstein
Tihanyi 32'; Zsótér 54' (pen.), 73'; Grabant 63'; Mayer 79'	Report

Globall Football Park, Telki
Referee: Elmir Pilav (Bosnia and Herzegovina)

20 October 2012
13:30

Italy	4–0	Liechtenstein
Capradossi 48'; Bonazzoli 49', 56', 58'	Report

Stadion Gyula Grosics, Tatabánya
Referee: Elmir Pilav (Bosnia and Herzegovina)
20 October 2012
13:30

Albania	0–1	Hungary
	Report	Tihanyi 19'

Globall Football Park, Telki
Referee: Adrien Jaccottet (Switzerland)

23 October 2012
13:30

Hungary	3–2	Italy
Zsótér 21' (pen.); Rácz 56', 75'	Report	Mauri 16'; Cerri 77' (pen.)

Globall Football Park, Telki
Referee: Adrien Jaccottet (Switzerland)
23 October 2012
13:30

Liechtenstein	0–6	Albania
	Report	Xhemo 12'; Aliu 25'; Lokaj 38'; Tahiraj 39'; Rashica 62'; Tschutscher 77' (o.g.)

Stadion Gyula Grosics, Tatabánya
Referee: Robert Rogers (Ireland)

== Group 9 ==
Pos	Team	Pld	W	D	L	GF	GA	GD	Pts	Qualification
1	Norway	3	3	0	0	5	1	+4	9	Elite round
2	Portugal	3	2	0	1	6	4	+2	6	Elite round
3	Iceland	3	1	0	2	4	6	−2	3	
4	Malta (H)	3	0	0	3	2	6	−4	0	

(H) Hosts
29 September 2012
13:00

Norway	2–1	Malta
Bytyqi 2'; Fossum 28'	Report	Degabriele 42'

Centenary Stadium, Ta' Qali
Referee: Bardhyl Pashaj (Albania)
29 September 2012
16:00

Portugal	4–2	Iceland
Ribeiro 14'; Postiga 17', 59', 63'	Report	Guðmundsson 71'; Tómasson 80' (pen.)

Centenary Stadium, Ta' Qali
Referee: Alexander Harkam (Austria)

1 October 2012
13:00

Norway	2–0	Iceland
Fossum 10'; Bytyqi 44'	Report

Centenary Stadium, Ta' Qali
Referee: Bardhyl Pashaj (Albania)
1 October 2012
16:00

Malta	1–2	Portugal
Attard 31'	Report	Guedes 17'; Moreira 38'

Centenary Stadium, Ta' Qali
Referee: Radu Petrescu (Romania)

4 October 2012
13:30

Portugal	0–1	Norway
	Report	Fossum 40+2'

Ta' Qali National Stadium, Ta' Qali
Referee: Alexander Harkam (Austria)
4 October 2012
13:30

Iceland	2–0	Malta
Sigurjonsson 12'; Tómasson 29' (pen.)	Report

Centenary Stadium, Ta' Qali
Referee: Radu Petrescu (Romania)

== Group 10 ==
Pos	Team	Pld	W	D	L	GF	GA	GD	Pts	Qualification
1	Republic of Ireland	3	2	1	0	7	2	+5	7	Elite round
2	Sweden	3	2	1	0	7	2	+5	7	Elite round
3	Romania	3	0	1	2	2	5	−3	1	
4	Macedonia (H)	3	0	1	2	2	9	−7	1	

(H) Hosts
29 September 2012
15:00

Republic of Ireland	1–1	Sweden
O'Halloran 43'	Report	Engvall 68'

Milano Arena, Kumanovo
Referee: Stavros Tritsonis (Greece)
30 September 2012
15:00

Romania	1–1	Macedonia
Ludusan 31'	Report	Sulejmanov 51'

Boris Trajkovski Stadium, Skopje
Referee: Wim Smet (Belgium)

2 October 2012
15:00

Republic of Ireland	4–1	Macedonia
Byrne 22' (pen.), 35' (pen.), 80'; Cleary 63'	Report	Sulejmanov 44' (pen.)

Boris Trajkovski Stadium, Skopje
Referee: Oleksandr Derdo (Ukraine)
2 October 2012
15:00

Sweden	2–1	Romania
Citaku 22', 67'	Report	Marin 29'

Milano Arena, Kumanovo
Referee: Stavros Tritsonis (Greece)

4 October 2012
15:00

Romania	0–2	Republic of Ireland
	Report	O'Halloran 11'; Mulhall 58'

Milano Arena, Kumanovo
Referee: Oleksandr Derdo (Ukraine)
4 October 2012
15:00

Macedonia	0–4	Sweden
	Report	Engvall 22'; Citaku 25'; Stojkovski 51' (o.g.); Halvadžić 74'

Boris Trajkovski Stadium, Skopje
Referee: Wim Smet (Belgium)

== Group 11 ==
Pos	Team	Pld	W	D	L	GF	GA	GD	Pts	Qualification
1	Czech Republic (H)	3	3	0	0	8	0	+8	9	Elite round
2	Russia	3	2	0	1	5	4	+1	6	Elite round
3	Denmark	3	1	0	2	4	5	−1	3	
4	Montenegro	3	0	0	3	0	8	−8	0	

(H) Hosts
25 September 2012
11:00

Czech Republic	3–0	Russia
Schick 1'; Matějů 67'; Černý 76'	Report

1. FC Kyjov, Kyjov
Referee: Igor Pristovnik (Croatia)
25 September 2012
16:00

Denmark	3–0	Montenegro
A. Christensen 30'; Raben 36'; Andersen 56'	Report

FC Palava Mikulov, Mikulov
Referee: Sergey Tsinkevich (Belarus)

27 September 2012
11:00

Montenegro	0–2	Czech Republic
	Report	Schick 36'; Galuška 38'

Na Šlajsi, Lanžhot
Referee: Arnold Hunter (Northern Ireland)
27 September 2012
16:00

Denmark	1–2	Russia
Sørensen 80+4'	Report	Sheydayev 4'; Chernov 53'

1. FC Kyjov, Kyjov
Referee: Sergey Tsinkevich (Belarus)

30 September 2012
15:30

Czech Republic	3–0	Denmark
Schick 7', 37'; Sadílek 28'	Report

FC Palava Mikulov, Mikulov
Referee: Arnold Hunter (Northern Ireland)
30 September 2012
15:30

Russia	3–0	Montenegro
Guliyev 36'; Sheydayev 53'; Mayrovich 80+2'	Report

Na Šlajsi, Lanžhot
Referee: Igor Pristovnik (Croatia)

== Group 12 ==
Pos	Team	Pld	W	D	L	GF	GA	GD	Pts	Qualification
1	Croatia (H)	3	3	0	0	10	5	+5	9	Elite round
2	Israel	3	2	0	1	12	8	+4	6	Elite round
3	Turkey	3	1	0	2	8	8	0	3	
4	Kazakhstan	3	0	0	3	2	11	−9	0	

(H) Hosts
14 October 2012
15:30

Turkey	3–0	Kazakhstan
Çınar 18' (pen.); Köse 30'; Altıntaş 42' (pen.)	Report

Stadion pokraj Jadra, Solin
Referee: Stephan Klossner (Switzerland)
14 October 2012
15:30

Croatia	4–2	Israel
Bašić 13', 17'; Brodić 29'; Roguljić 80+1'	Report	Ben Aharon 2'; Biton 69'

Gradski stadion, Sinj
Referee: Yuriy Mozharovskyy (Ukraine)

16 October 2012
15:30

Turkey	2–4	Israel
Altıntaş 25', 63'	Report	Weissman 47', 59'; Mizrachi 61'; Eiloz 65'

Stadion u Pricviću, Žrnovnica
Referee: Dawid Piasecki (Poland)
16 October 2012
15:30

Kazakhstan	0–2	Croatia
	Report	Mamić 18'; Bašić 40'

Stadion Hrvatski vitezovi, Dugopolje
Referee: Stephan Klossner (Switzerland)

19 October 2012
15:30

Croatia	4–3	Turkey
Murić 13'; Fiolić 27'; Roguljić 43'; Krešić 70'	Report	Öztürk 25'; Gemicibaşı 63'; Acar 76'

Stadion Gospin dolac, Imotski
Referee: Dawid Piasecki (Poland)
19 October 2012
15:30

Israel	6–2	Kazakhstan
Weissman 7', 80'; Ben Aharon 22'; Mizrachi 37'; Eiloz 66' (pen.); Farhat 80+3'	Report	Sakhibov 28'; Nurmugamet 33'

Gradski stadion, Sinj
Referee: Yuriy Mozharovskyy (Ukraine)

== Group 13 ==
Pos	Team	Pld	W	D	L	GF	GA	GD	Pts	Qualification
1	Ukraine	3	2	1	0	9	1	+8	7	Elite round
2	Georgia (H)	3	2	0	1	7	4	+3	6	Elite round
3	Scotland	3	1	1	1	5	5	0	4	
4	Luxembourg	3	0	0	3	3	14	−11	0	

(H) Hosts
30 October 2012
12:00

Scotland	5–2	Luxembourg
Muirhead 5', 40+1', 57' (pen.); McMullan 64'; Sinnamon 80+1'	Report	Sacras 68' (pen.); Mangen 79'

GFF Technical Center Basa, Tbilisi
Referee: Johnny Casanova (San Marino)
30 October 2012
12:00

Georgia	1–3	Ukraine
Tevzadze 79'	Report	Luchkevych 9'; Boryachuk 58'; Tretyakov 69'

Mikheil Meskhi Stadium, Tbilisi
Referee: Vasilis Dimitriou (Cyprus)

1 November 2012
12:00

Scotland	0–0	Ukraine
	Report

GFF Technical Center Basa, Tbilisi
Referee: Ivaylo Stoyanov (Bulgaria)
1 November 2012
12:00

Luxembourg	1–3	Georgia
Schoos 80+3'	Report	Zarandia 14'; Kerdzevadze 34'; Meskhi 75'

Mikheil Meskhi Stadium, Tbilisi
Referee: Johnny Casanova (San Marino)

4 November 2012
12:00

Georgia	3–0	Scotland
Zarandia 17', 80+3'; Gorozia 64'	Report

Mikheil Meskhi Stadium, Tbilisi
Referee: Ivaylo Stoyanov (Bulgaria)
4 November 2012
12:00

Ukraine	6–0	Luxembourg
Lukyanchuk 29'; Kovalenko 32'; Zinchenko 34'; Arendaruk 39'; Luchkevych 60'; Polyuhanych 73'	Report

GFF Technical Center Basa, Tbilisi
Referee: Vasilis Dimitriou (Cyprus)

== Ranking of third-placed teams ==
To determine the two best third-ranked teams from the qualifying round, only the results of the third-placed team against the winners and runners-up in each group are taken into account.

=== Tiebreakers ===
The following criteria are applied to determine the rankings.

1. Higher number of points obtained in these matches
2. Superior goal difference from these matches
3. Higher number of goals scored in these matches
4. Fair play conduct of the teams in all group matches in the qualifying round
5. Drawing of lots

Pos	Grp	Team	Pld	W	D	L	GF	GA	GD	Pts	Qualification
1	4	Spain	2	1	0	1	1	1	0	3	Elite round
2	7	Estonia	2	0	1	1	1	3	−2	1	Elite round
3	13	Scotland	2	0	1	1	0	3	−3	1	
4	6	Cyprus	2	0	1	1	1	5	−4	1	
5	8	Albania	2	0	0	2	0	2	−2	0	
6	12	Turkey	2	0	0	2	5	8	−3	0	
7	10	Romania	2	0	0	2	1	4	−3	0	
8	5	Bosnia and Herzegovina	2	0	0	2	1	4	−3	0	
9	9	Iceland	2	0	0	2	2	6	−4	0	
10	11	Denmark	2	0	0	2	1	5	−4	0	
11	1	Moldova	2	0	0	2	0	5	−5	0	
12	3	Latvia	2	0	0	2	1	7	−6	0	
13	2	San Marino	2	0	0	2	0	10	−10	0	
