= Tarakanov (disambiguation) =

Tarakanov / Tarakanova is a Russian surname.

Tarakanov may also refer to:

- Tarakanov, Alexeyevsky District, Russia
- Tarakanov Ridge, Antarctica

== See also ==
- Tarakanovo
- Tarakanovka
- Tarakanova
