= 2016–17 UEFA Champions League qualifying =

International football competition

2016–17 UEFA Champions League qualifying was the preliminary phase of the 2016–17 UEFA Champions League, prior to the competition proper. Qualification consisted of the qualifying phase (first to third rounds) and the play-off round. It began on 28 June and ended on 24 August 2016. A total of 56 teams competed in the qualifying phase and play-off round to decide 10 of the 32 places in the group stage.

All times are CEST (UTC+2).

== Round and draw dates ==
The schedule of the competition was as follows (all draws were held at the UEFA headquarters in Nyon, Switzerland, unless stated otherwise).

Round	Draw date and time	First leg	Second leg
First qualifying round	20 June 2016, 12:00	28–29 June 2016	5–6 July 2016
Second qualifying round	20 June 2016, 12:00	12–13 July 2016	19–20 July 2016
Third qualifying round	15 July 2016, 12:00	26–27 July 2016	2–3 August 2016
Play-off round	5 August 2016, 12:00	16–17 August 2016	23–24 August 2016

== Format ==
In the qualifying phase and play-off round, each tie was played over two legs, with each team playing one leg at home. The team that scored more goals on aggregate over the two legs advanced to the next round. If the aggregate score was level, the away goals rule would be applied, i.e., the team that scored more goals away from home over the two legs advances. If away goals were also equal, then 30 minutes of extra time would be played, divided into two 15-minute halves. The away goals rule would be again applied after extra time, i.e., if there were goals scored during extra time and the aggregate score was still level, the visiting team advanced by virtue of more away goals scored. If no goals were scored during extra time, the tie would be decided by penalty shoot-out.

In the draws for each round, teams were seeded based on their UEFA club coefficients at the beginning of the season, with the teams divided into seeded and unseeded pots. A seeded team was drawn against an unseeded team, with the order of legs in each tie decided by draw. Due to the limited time between matches, the draws for the second and third qualifying rounds took place before the results of the previous round were known. For these draws (or in any cases where the result of a tie in the previous round was not known at the time of the draw), the seeding was carried out under the assumption that the team with the higher coefficient of an undecided tie advanced to this round, which means if the team with the lower coefficient was to advance, it simply took the seeding of its defeated opponent. Prior to the draws, UEFA may form "groups" in accordance with the principles set by the Club Competitions Committee, but they are purely for convenience of the draw and for ensuring that teams from the same association are not drawn against each other, and do not resemble any real groupings in the sense of the competition.

== Teams ==
There were two routes which the teams were separated into during qualifying:

- Champions Route, which included all domestic champions which do not qualify directly for the group stage.
- League Route (also called the Non-champions Path or the Best-placed Path), which included all domestic non-champions which did not qualify directly for the group stage.

A total of 56 teams (41 in Champions Route, 15 in League Route) were involved in the qualifying phase and play-off round. The 10 winners of the play-off round (5 in Champions Route, 5 in League Route) advanced to the group stage to join the 22 teams which enter in the group stage. The 15 losers of the third qualifying round entered the Europa League play-off round, and the 10 losers of the play-off round enter the Europa League group stage.

Below are the participating teams (with their 2016 UEFA club coefficients), grouped by their starting rounds.

Key to colours
Winners of the play-off round advance to the group stage
Losers of the play-off round enter the Europa League group stage
Losers of the third qualifying round enter the Europa League play-off round

=== Champions Route ===
Third qualifying round
Team	Coeff
(Greece) Olympiacos	70.940
(Czech Republic) Viktoria Plzeň	44.585
(Romania) Astra Giurgiu	11.076

Second qualifying round
Team	Coeff
(Austria) Red Bull Salzburg	42.520
(Scotland) Celtic	40.460
(Cyprus) APOEL	35.935
(Belarus) BATE Borisov	34.000
(Poland) Legia Warsaw	28.000
(Croatia) Dinamo Zagreb	25.775
(Bulgaria) Ludogorets Razgrad	25.625
(Denmark) Copenhagen	24.720
(Azerbaijan) Qarabağ	13.475
(Norway) Rosenborg	12.850
(Kazakhstan) Astana	12.575
(Moldova) Sheriff Tiraspol	10.575
(Serbia) Red Star Belgrade	7.175
(Georgia (country)) Dinamo Tbilisi	5.875
(Iceland) FH	5.750
(Slovakia) Trenčín	5.400
(Luxembourg) F91 Dudelange	5.050
(Lithuania) Žalgiris	4.925
(Israel) Hapoel Be'er Sheva	4.725
(Slovenia) Olimpija Ljubljana	4.625
(North Macedonia) Vardar	4.200
(Sweden) IFK Norrköping	3.975
(Hungary) Ferencváros	3.475
(Northern Ireland) Crusaders	3.400
(Bosnia and Herzegovina) Zrinjski Mostar	3.175
(Republic of Ireland) Dundalk	2.590
(Montenegro) Mladost Podgorica	2.475
(Finland) SJK	1.730
(Albania) Partizani	1.575
(Latvia) Liepāja	1.075

First qualifying round
Team	Coeff
(Wales) The New Saints	5.200
(Malta) Valletta	4.466
(Estonia) Flora	3.350
(Andorra) FC Santa Coloma	2.699
(Faroe Islands) B36	1.975
(Gibraltar) Lincoln Red Imps	1.700
(Armenia) Alashkert	1.325
(San Marino) Tre Penne	1.316

Notes

1. ^{†} Skënderbeu (Coeff: 7.825) were excluded from participating in the 2016–17 European competitions by UEFA for match-fixing. They appealed the decision to the Court of Arbitration for Sport, and UEFA agreed to suspend the exclusion and Skënderbeu Korçë were included in the second qualifying round draw. The final decision to exclude Skënderbeu was made by the Court of Arbitration for Sport on 6 July 2016, before the second qualifying round was played. As a result, the berth was given to the runners-up Partizani.

=== League Route ===
Play-off round
Team	Coeff
(England) Manchester City	99.256
(Portugal) Porto	92.616
(Spain) Villarreal	60.142
(Germany) Borussia Mönchengladbach	42.035
(Italy) Roma	41.587

Third qualifying round
Team	Coeff
(Ukraine) Shakhtar Donetsk	81.976
(Netherlands) Ajax	58.112
(Belgium) Anderlecht	54.000
(Turkey) Fenerbahçe	40.920
(Czech Republic) Sparta Prague	40.585
(Greece) PAOK	37.440
(Romania) Steaua București	36.576
(France) Monaco	36.549
(Switzerland) Young Boys	24.755
(Russia) Rostov	11.716

== First qualifying round ==
=== Seeding ===
A total of eight teams played in the first qualifying round. The draw was held on 20 June 2016.

Seeded	Unseeded
(Wales) The New Saints (Malta) Valletta (Estonia) Flora (Andorra) FC Santa Coloma	(Faroe Islands) B36 (Gibraltar) Lincoln Red Imps (Armenia) Alashkert (San Marino) Tre Penne

=== Summary ===
The first legs were played on 28 June, and the second legs were played on 5 and 6 July 2016.

Team 1	Agg.	Team 2	1st leg	2nd leg
Flora (Estonia)	2–3	(Gibraltar) Lincoln Red Imps	2–1	0–2
The New Saints (Wales)	5–1	(San Marino) Tre Penne	2–1	3–0
Valletta (Malta)	2–2 (a)	(Faroe Islands) B36	1–0	1–2
FC Santa Coloma (Andorra)	0–3	(Armenia) Alashkert	0–0	0–3

=== Matches ===
28 June 2016
18:00

Flora (Estonia)	2–1	(Gibraltar) Lincoln Red Imps
Alliku 35'; Sappinen 49'	Report	J. Chipolina 57'

A. Le Coq Arena, Tallinn
Attendance: 886
Referee: Rob Harvey (Republic of Ireland)
6 July 2016
19:00

Lincoln Red Imps (Gibraltar)	2–0	(Estonia) Flora
J. Chipolina 15' (pen.); Calderón 79'	Report

Victoria Stadium, Gibraltar
Attendance: 1,020
Referee: Alain Durieux (Luxembourg)

Lincoln Red Imps won 3–2 on aggregate.

28 June 2016
20:00

The New Saints (Wales)	2–1	(San Marino) Tre Penne
Quigley 13'; Mullan 40'	Report	Fraternali 16'

Park Hall, Oswestry
Attendance: 712
Referee: Trustin Farrugia Cann (Malta)
5 July 2016
20:30

Tre Penne (San Marino)	0–3	(Wales) The New Saints
	Report	Quigley 45'; Edwards 47'; Draper 90'

San Marino Stadium, Serravalle
Attendance: 743
Referee: Lorenc Jemini (Albania)

The New Saints won 5–1 on aggregate.

28 June 2016
19:00

Valletta (Malta)	1–0	(Faroe Islands) B36
Falcone 69'	Report

Hibernians Stadium, Paola (Note: Valletta played their home matches at Hibernians Stadium, Paola, instead of their regular stadium National Stadium, Ta' Qali.)
Attendance: 1,151
Referee: Radu Petrescu (Romania)
5 July 2016
19:00

B36 (Faroe Islands)	2–1	(Malta) Valletta
Thorleifsson 11'; Agnarsson 66'	Report	Falcone 24'

Gundadalur, Tórshavn
Attendance: 850
Referee: Roomer Tarajev (Estonia)

2–2 on aggregate; Valletta won on away goals.

28 June 2016
20:00

FC Santa Coloma (Andorra)	0–0	(Armenia) Alashkert
	Report

Estadi Comunal, Andorra la Vella
Attendance: 600
Referee: Alex Troleis (Faroe Islands)
5 July 2016
17:00

Alashkert (Armenia)	3–0	(Andorra) FC Santa Coloma
V. Minasyan 12'; Gyozalyan 84'; Artur Yedigaryan 88'	Report

Vazgen Sargsyan Republican Stadium, Yerevan (Note: Alashkert played their home matches at Vazgen Sargsyan Republican Stadium, Yerevan, instead of their regular stadium Alashkert Stadium, Yerevan.)
Attendance: 2,100
Referee: Alexandr Aliyev (Kazakhstan)

Alashkert won 3–0 on aggregate.

== Second qualifying round ==
=== Seeding ===
A total of 34 teams played in the second qualifying round: 30 teams which entered in this round, and the four winners of the first qualifying round. The draw was held on 20 June 2016.

Group 1		Group 2		Group 3	
Seeded	Unseeded	Seeded	Unseeded	Seeded	Unseeded
(Austria) Red Bull Salzburg (Croatia) Dinamo Zagreb (Azerbaijan) Qarabağ (Moldova) Sheriff Tiraspol (Slovakia) Trenčín	(Luxembourg) F91 Dudelange (Israel) Hapoel Be'er Sheva (Slovenia) Olimpija Ljubljana (North Macedonia) Vardar (Latvia) Liepāja	(Cyprus) APOEL (Poland) Legia Warsaw (Bulgaria) Ludogorets Razgrad (Kazakhstan) Astana (Albania) Skënderbeu (Georgia (country)) Dinamo Tbilisi	(Wales) The New Saints (Lithuania) Žalgiris (Hungary) Ferencváros (Bosnia and Herzegovina) Zrinjski Mostar (Armenia) Alashkert (Montenegro) Mladost Podgorica	(Scotland) Celtic (Belarus) BATE Borisov (Denmark) Copenhagen (Norway) Rosenborg (Serbia) Red Star Belgrade (Iceland) FH	(Gibraltar) Lincoln Red Imps (Sweden) IFK Norrköping (Northern Ireland) Crusaders (Malta) Valletta (Republic of Ireland) Dundalk (Finland) SJK

Notes

1. ^{†} Winners of the first qualifying round whose identity was not known at the time of the draw. Teams in italics defeated a team with a higher coefficient in the first qualifying round, thus effectively taking the coefficient of their defeated opponent in the draw for the second qualifying round.
2. ^{††} Skënderbeu would have qualified for the Champions League second qualifying round as the champions of the 2015–16 Albanian Superliga, but were excluded from participating in the 2016–17 European competitions by UEFA for match-fixing. They were included in the second qualifying round awaiting an appeal to the Court of Arbitration for Sport, and participated in the draw. On 6 July 2016, after their appeal was denied, they were replaced in the Second qualifying round by Partizani.

=== Summary ===
The first legs were played on 12 and 13 July, and the second legs were played on 19 and 20 July 2016.

Team 1	Agg.	Team 2	1st leg	2nd leg
Qarabağ (Azerbaijan)	3–1	(Luxembourg) F91 Dudelange	2–0	1–1
Hapoel Be'er Sheva (Israel)	3–2	(Moldova) Sheriff Tiraspol	3–2	0–0
Olimpija Ljubljana (Slovenia)	6–6 (a)	(Slovakia) Trenčín	3–4	3–2
Red Bull Salzburg (Austria)	3–0	(Latvia) Liepāja	1–0	2–0
Vardar (North Macedonia)	3–5	(Croatia) Dinamo Zagreb	1–2	2–3
The New Saints (Wales)	0–3	(Cyprus) APOEL	0–0	0–3
Zrinjski Mostar (Bosnia and Herzegovina)	1–3	(Poland) Legia Warsaw	1–1	0–2
Ludogorets Razgrad (Bulgaria)	5–0	(Montenegro) Mladost Podgorica	2–0	3–0
Dinamo Tbilisi (Georgia (country))	3–1	(Armenia) Alashkert	2–0	1–1
Žalgiris (Lithuania)	1–2	(Kazakhstan) Astana	0–0	1–2
Partizani (Albania)	2–2 (3–1 p)	(Hungary) Ferencváros	1–1	1–1 (a.e.t.)
BATE Borisov (Belarus)	4–2	(Finland) SJK	2–0	2–2
Valletta (Malta)	2–4	(Serbia) Red Star Belgrade	1–2	1–2
Rosenborg (Norway)	5–4	(Sweden) IFK Norrköping	3–1	2–3
Dundalk (Republic of Ireland)	3–3 (a)	(Iceland) FH	1–1	2–2
Lincoln Red Imps (Gibraltar)	1–3	(Scotland) Celtic	1–0	0–3
Crusaders (Northern Ireland)	0–9	(Denmark) Copenhagen	0–3	0–6

=== Matches ===
12 July 2016
19:00

Qarabağ (Azerbaijan)	2–0	(Luxembourg) F91 Dudelange
Almeida 10' (pen.), 27'	Report

Tofiq Bahramov Republican Stadium, Baku (Note: Qarabağ played their home matches at Tofiq Bahramov Republican Stadium, Baku, instead of their regular stadium Azersun Arena, Baku.)
Attendance: 18,600
Referee: Orel Grinfeld (Israel)
20 July 2016
18:00

F91 Dudelange (Luxembourg)	1–1	(Azerbaijan) Qarabağ
N'Diaye 71'	Report	Reynaldo 90+4'

Stade Jos Nosbaum, Dudelange
Attendance: 891
Referee: Kevin Clancy (Scotland)

Qarabağ won 3–1 on aggregate.

12 July 2016
19:50

Hapoel Be'er Sheva (Israel)	3–2	(Moldova) Sheriff Tiraspol
Ogu 43'; Barda 52' (pen.); Radi 90' (pen.)	Report	Ivančić 22'; Brezovec 64'

Turner Stadium, Be'er Sheva
Attendance: 15,939
Referee: Carlos del Cerro Grande (Spain)
19 July 2016
19:00

Sheriff Tiraspol (Moldova)	0–0	(Israel) Hapoel Be'er Sheva
	Report

Sheriff Stadium, Tiraspol
Attendance: 8,184
Referee: Daniel Stefański (Poland)

Hapoel Be'er Sheva won 3–2 on aggregate.

13 July 2016
20:30

Olimpija Ljubljana (Slovenia)	3–4	(Slovakia) Trenčín
Velikonja 34'; Zajc 43'; Eleke 89'	Report	Lawrence 4'; Kalu 6'; Janga 20'; Holúbek 32'

Stožice Stadium, Ljubljana
Attendance: 5,950
Referee: Ali Palabıyık (Turkey)
20 July 2016
20:15

Trenčín (Slovakia)	2–3	(Slovenia) Olimpija Ljubljana
Janga 13'; Bero 20'	Report	Kelhar 41'; Eleke 45'; Klinar 79'

Štadión pod Dubňom, Žilina (Note: Trenčín played their home matches at Štadión pod Dubňom, Žilina, instead of their regular stadium Štadión na Sihoti, Trenčín.)
Attendance: 3,750
Referee: João Capela (Portugal)

6–6 on aggregate; Trenčín won on away goals.

12 July 2016
20:30

Red Bull Salzburg (Austria)	1–0	(Latvia) Liepāja
Soriano 83'	Report

Red Bull Arena, Wals-Siezenheim
Attendance: 6,917
Referee: Enea Jorgji (Albania)
19 July 2016
18:00

Liepāja (Latvia)	0–2	(Austria) Red Bull Salzburg
	Report	Berisha 35'; Bernardo 65'

Daugava Stadium, Liepāja
Attendance: 3,633
Referee: Jonathan Lardot (Belgium)

Red Bull Salzburg won 3–0 on aggregate.

12 July 2016
20:45

Vardar (North Macedonia)	1–2	(Croatia) Dinamo Zagreb
Hambardzumyan 54'	Report	Mijušković 21' (o.g.); Rog 30'

Philip II Arena, Skopje
Attendance: 17,000
Referee: Bobby Madley (England)
20 July 2016
20:45

Dinamo Zagreb (Croatia)	3–2	(North Macedonia) Vardar
Pjaca 55' (pen.), 70' (pen.); Machado 79'	Report	Velkovski 39', 63'

Stadion Maksimir, Zagreb
Attendance: 10,142
Referee: Sergey Ivanov (Russia)

Dinamo Zagreb won 5–3 on aggregate.

12 July 2016
20:00

The New Saints (Wales)	0–0	(Cyprus) APOEL
	Report

Park Hall, Oswestry
Attendance: 1,056
Referee: Hugo Miguel (Portugal)
19 July 2016
19:00

APOEL (Cyprus)	3–0	(Wales) The New Saints
Alexandrou 54'; Sotiriou 73'; De Vincenti 90+5' (pen.)	Report

GSP Stadium, Nicosia
Attendance: 10,548
Referee: Nikola Dabanović (Montenegro)

APOEL won 3–0 on aggregate.

12 July 2016
18:30

Zrinjski Mostar (Bosnia and Herzegovina)	1–1	(Poland) Legia Warsaw
Katanec 57'	Report	Nikolić 49'

Stadion pod Bijelim Brijegom, Mostar
Attendance: 5,500
Referee: Carlos Clos Gómez (Spain)
19 July 2016
20:45

Legia Warsaw (Poland)	2–0	(Bosnia and Herzegovina) Zrinjski Mostar
Nikolić 28' (pen.), 62'	Report

Polish Army Stadium, Warsaw
Attendance: 12,784
Referee: Nicolas Rainville (France)

Legia Warsaw won 3–1 on aggregate.

13 July 2016
19:30

Ludogorets Razgrad (Bulgaria)	2–0	(Montenegro) Mladost Podgorica
Moți 13' (pen.); Lukoki 26'	Report

Ludogorets Arena, Razgrad
Attendance: 6,000
Referee: Sergey Lapochkin (Russia)
19 July 2016
20:45

Mladost Podgorica (Montenegro)	0–3	(Bulgaria) Ludogorets Razgrad
	Report	Lukoki 39', 64'; Wanderson 48'

City Stadium, Podgorica (Note: Mladost Podgorica played their home match at City Stadium, Podgorica, instead of their regular stadium Stadion FK Mladost, Podgorica.)
Attendance: 4,300
Referee: Pol van Boekel (Netherlands)

Ludogorets Razgrad won 5–0 on aggregate.

12 July 2016
19:00

Dinamo Tbilisi (Georgia (country))	2–0	(Armenia) Alashkert
Kiteishvili 55'; Kvilitaia 69' (pen.)	Report

Boris Paichadze Dinamo Arena, Tbilisi
Attendance: 11,769
Referee: Sebastian Colțescu (Romania)
19 July 2016
17:00

Alashkert (Armenia)	1–1	(Georgia (country)) Dinamo Tbilisi
Gyozalyan 51'	Report	Jighauri 21'

Vazgen Sargsyan Republican Stadium, Yerevan
Attendance: 4,600
Referee: Mohammed Al-Hakim (Sweden)

Dinamo Tbilisi won 3–1 on aggregate.

13 July 2016
19:15

Žalgiris (Lithuania)	0–0	(Kazakhstan) Astana
	Report

LFF Stadium, Vilnius
Attendance: 4,100
Referee: Vlado Glođović (Serbia)
20 July 2016
16:00

Astana (Kazakhstan)	2–1	(Lithuania) Žalgiris
Aničić 31', 90+2'	Report	Elivelto 57'

Astana Arena, Astana
Attendance: 18,449
Referee: Sandro Schäfer (Switzerland)

Astana won 2–1 on aggregate.

13 July 2016
20:00

Partizani (Albania)	1–1	(Hungary) Ferencváros
Fili 47'	Report	Böde 71'

Elbasan Arena, Elbasan (Note: Partizani played their home matches at Elbasan Arena, Elbasan, instead of their regular stadium Selman Stërmasi Stadium, Tirana.)
Attendance: 1,700
Referee: Benoît Millot (France)
20 July 2016
19:30

Ferencváros (Hungary)	1–1 (a.e.t.)	(Albania) Partizani
Gera 14' (pen.)	Report	Hüsing 40' (o.g.)
Penalties
Gera (penalty missed); Šesták (penalty missed); Nagy (penalty scored); Ramírez (penalty missed)	1–3	(penalty scored) Hoxha; (penalty missed) Vila; (penalty scored) Trashi; (penalty scored) Ekuban

Groupama Arena, Budapest
Attendance: 8,752
Referee: Kristo Tohver (Estonia)

2–2 on aggregate; Partizani won 3–1 on penalties.

12 July 2016
20:00

BATE Borisov (Belarus)	2–0	(Finland) SJK
Kendysh 32'; Rodionov 68'	Report

Borisov Arena, Barysaw
Attendance: 9,247
Referee: Andris Treimanis (Latvia)
19 July 2016
19:00

SJK (Finland)	2–2	(Belarus) BATE Borisov
Ngueukam 44'; Riski 61'	Report	Karnitsky 15'; Rios 29'

OmaSP Stadion, Seinäjoki
Attendance: 5,817
Referee: Bastian Dankert (Germany)

BATE Borisov won 4–2 on aggregate.

12 July 2016
20:00

Valletta (Malta)	1–2	(Serbia) Red Star Belgrade
Falcone 15'	Report	Katai 66'; Sikimić 75'

Hibernians Stadium, Paola
Attendance: 1,098
Referee: Alexander Harkam (Austria)
19 July 2016
20:30

Red Star Belgrade (Serbia)	2–1	(Malta) Valletta
Donald 30'; Katai 76'	Report	Caruana 11'

Red Star Stadium, Belgrade
Attendance: 31,112
Referee: Tore Hansen (Norway)

Red Star Belgrade won 4–2 on aggregate.

13 July 2016
19:15

Rosenborg (Norway)	3–1	(Sweden) IFK Norrköping
Eyjólfsson 48'; Helland 62'; De Lanlay 65'	Report	Andersson 70'

Lerkendal Stadion, Trondheim
Attendance: 11,595
Referee: Davide Massa (Italy)
20 July 2016
19:15

IFK Norrköping (Sweden)	3–2	(Norway) Rosenborg
Andersson 57', 77'; Nyman 59'	Report	Gytkjær 36' (pen.); De Lanlay 55'

Nya Parken, Norrköping
Attendance: 10,372
Referee: Craig Pawson (England)

Rosenborg won 5–4 on aggregate.

13 July 2016
20:45

Dundalk (Republic of Ireland)	1–1	(Iceland) FH
McMillan 66'	Report	Lennon 77'

Oriel Park, Dundalk
Attendance: 3,111
Referee: Nikola Popov (Bulgaria)
20 July 2016
21:15

FH (Iceland)	2–2	(Republic of Ireland) Dundalk
Hewson 19'; K. F. Finnbogason 78'	Report	McMillan 52', 62'

Kaplakriki, Hafnarfjörður
Attendance: 1,850
Referee: Paolo Valeri (Italy)

3–3 on aggregate; Dundalk won on away goals.

12 July 2016
20:00

Lincoln Red Imps (Gibraltar)	1–0	(Scotland) Celtic
L. Casciaro 48'	Report

Victoria Stadium, Gibraltar
Attendance: 1,632
Referee: Andreas Ekberg (Sweden)
20 July 2016
20:45

Celtic (Scotland)	3–0	(Gibraltar) Lincoln Red Imps
Lustig 23'; Griffiths 25'; Roberts 29'	Report

Celtic Park, Glasgow
Attendance: 55,632
Referee: Bartosz Frankowski (Poland)

Celtic won 3–1 on aggregate.

13 July 2016
20:00

Crusaders (Northern Ireland)	0–3	(Denmark) Copenhagen
	Report	Santander 6'; Cornelius 40'; Falk 53'

Seaview, Belfast
Attendance: 2,069
Referee: Stephan Klossner (Switzerland)
19 July 2016
19:15

Copenhagen (Denmark)	6–0	(Northern Ireland) Crusaders
Pavlović 15'; Mitchell 45+1' (o.g.); Cornelius 48', 76'; Falk 58'; Greguš 68'	Report

Parken Stadium, Copenhagen
Attendance: 6,924
Referee: Ante Vučemilović-Šimunović (Croatia)

Copenhagen won 9–0 on aggregate.

== Third qualifying round ==
=== Seeding ===
The third qualifying round was split into two separate sections: Champions Route (for league champions) and League Route (for league non-champions). The losing teams in both sections entered the 2016–17 UEFA Europa League play-off round.

A total of 30 teams played in the third qualifying round:

- Champions Route: three teams which enter in this round, and the 17 winners of the second qualifying round.
- League Route: ten teams which enter in this round.

The draw for the third qualifying round was held on 15 July 2016.

Champions Route				League Route	
Group 1		Group 2		League Route	
Seeded	Unseeded	Seeded	Unseeded	Seeded	Unseeded
(Greece) Olympiacos (Scotland) Celtic (Cyprus) APOEL (Poland) Legia Warsaw (Croatia) Dinamo Zagreb	(Norway) Rosenborg (Kazakhstan) Astana (Israel) Hapoel Be'er Sheva (Georgia (country)) Dinamo Tbilisi (Slovakia) Trenčín	(Czech Republic) Viktoria Plzeň (Austria) Red Bull Salzburg (Belarus) BATE Borisov (Bulgaria) Ludogorets Razgrad (Denmark) Copenhagen	(Azerbaijan) Qarabağ (Romania) Astra Giurgiu (Serbia) Red Star Belgrade (Republic of Ireland) Dundalk (Albania) Partizani	(Ukraine) Shakhtar Donetsk (Netherlands) Ajax (Belgium) Anderlecht (Turkey) Fenerbahçe (Czech Republic) Sparta Prague	(Greece) PAOK (Romania) Steaua București (France) Monaco (Switzerland) Young Boys (Russia) Rostov

Notes

1. ^{†} Winners of the second qualifying round, whose identity was not known at the time of the draw. Teams in italics defeated a team with a higher coefficient in the second qualifying round, thus effectively taking the coefficient of their defeated opponent in the draw for the third qualifying round.
2. ^{††} On 17 July 2014, the UEFA emergency panel ruled that Ukrainian and Russian clubs would not be drawn against each other "until further notice" due to the political unrest between the countries.

=== Summary ===
The first legs were played on 26 and 27 July, and the second legs were played on 2 and 3 August 2016.

Team 1	Agg.	Team 2	1st leg	2nd leg
Champions Route
Rosenborg (Norway)	2–4	(Cyprus) APOEL	2–1	0–3
Dinamo Zagreb (Croatia)	3–0	(Georgia (country)) Dinamo Tbilisi	2–0	1–0
Olympiacos (Greece)	0–1	(Israel) Hapoel Be'er Sheva	0–0	0–1
Astana (Kazakhstan)	2–3	(Scotland) Celtic	1–1	1–2
Trenčín (Slovakia)	0–1	(Poland) Legia Warsaw	0–1	0–0
Viktoria Plzeň (Czech Republic)	1–1 (a)	(Azerbaijan) Qarabağ	0–0	1–1
Astra Giurgiu (Romania)	1–4	(Denmark) Copenhagen	1–1	0–3
BATE Borisov (Belarus)	1–3	(Republic of Ireland) Dundalk	1–0	0–3
Ludogorets Razgrad (Bulgaria)	6–4	(Serbia) Red Star Belgrade	2–2	4–2 (a.e.t.)
Partizani (Albania)	0–3	(Austria) Red Bull Salzburg	0–1	0–2
League Route
Ajax (Netherlands)	3–2	(Greece) PAOK	1–1	2–1
Sparta Prague (Czech Republic)	1–3	(Romania) Steaua București	1–1	0–2
Shakhtar Donetsk (Ukraine)	2–2 (2–4 p)	(Switzerland) Young Boys	2–0	0–2 (a.e.t.)
Rostov (Russia)	4–2	(Belgium) Anderlecht	2–2	2–0
Fenerbahçe (Turkey)	3–4	(France) Monaco	2–1	1–3

=== Champions Route matches ===
27 July 2016
19:15

Rosenborg (Norway)	2–1	(Cyprus) APOEL
Gytkjær 23'; Skjelvik 45+1'	Report	Efrem 67'

Lerkendal Stadion, Trondheim
Attendance: 13,281
Referee: Slavko Vinčić (Slovenia)
2 August 2016
19:00

APOEL (Cyprus)	3–0	(Norway) Rosenborg
Gianniotas 90+1'; Vander 90+6'; De Vincenti 90+9'	Report

GSP Stadium, Nicosia
Attendance: 15,559
Referee: Paweł Raczkowski (Poland)

APOEL won 4–2 on aggregate.

26 July 2016
20:45

Dinamo Zagreb (Croatia)	2–0	(Georgia (country)) Dinamo Tbilisi
Soudani 39'; Ćorić 42'	Report

Stadion Maksimir, Zagreb
Attendance: 10,258
Referee: Bobby Madden (Scotland)
2 August 2016
19:00

Dinamo Tbilisi (Georgia (country))	0–1	(Croatia) Dinamo Zagreb
	Report	Rog 8'

Boris Paichadze Dinamo Arena, Tbilisi
Attendance: 21,510
Referee: Miroslav Zelinka (Czech Republic)

Dinamo Zagreb won 3–0 on aggregate.

27 July 2016
20:45

Olympiacos (Greece)	0–0	(Israel) Hapoel Be'er Sheva
	Report

Karaiskakis Stadium, Piraeus
Attendance: 20,531
Referee: Jorge Sousa (Portugal)
3 August 2016
20:00

Hapoel Be'er Sheva (Israel)	1–0	(Greece) Olympiacos
Tzedek 79'	Report

Turner Stadium, Be'er Sheva
Attendance: 15,500
Referee: Benoît Bastien (France)

Hapoel Be'er Sheva won 1–0 on aggregate.

27 July 2016
16:00

Astana (Kazakhstan)	1–1	(Scotland) Celtic
Logvinenko 19'	Report	Griffiths 78'

Astana Arena, Astana
Attendance: 29,000
Referee: Paolo Mazzoleni (Italy)
3 August 2016
20:45

Celtic (Scotland)	2–1	(Kazakhstan) Astana
Griffiths 45+2' (pen.); Dembélé 90+2' (pen.)	Report	Ibraimi 62'

Celtic Park, Glasgow
Attendance: 52,952
Referee: István Kovács (Romania)

Celtic won 3–2 on aggregate.

27 July 2016
20:30

Trenčín (Slovakia)	0–1	(Poland) Legia Warsaw
	Report	Nikolić 69'

Štadión pod Dubňom, Žilina
Attendance: 5,866
Referee: Aleksei Kulbakov (Belarus)
3 August 2016
20:45

Legia Warsaw (Poland)	0–0	(Slovakia) Trenčín
	Report

Polish Army Stadium, Warsaw
Attendance: 21,850
Referee: Vladislav Bezborodov (Russia)

Legia Warsaw won 1–0 on aggregate.

26 July 2016
20:15

Viktoria Plzeň (Czech Republic)	0–0	(Azerbaijan) Qarabağ
	Report

Doosan Arena, Plzeň
Attendance: 10,269
Referee: Aleksandar Stavrev (Macedonia)
2 August 2016
18:30

Qarabağ (Azerbaijan)	1–1	(Czech Republic) Viktoria Plzeň
Muarem 28'	Report	Krmenčík 85'

Tofiq Bahramov Republican Stadium, Baku
Attendance: 30,792
Referee: Hüseyin Göçek (Turkey)

1–1 on aggregate; Viktoria Plzeň won on away goals.

27 July 2016
19:30

Astra Giurgiu (Romania)	1–1	(Denmark) Copenhagen
Teixeira 7'	Report	Delaney 64'

Stadionul Marin Anastasovici, Giurgiu
Attendance: 2,381
Referee: István Vad (Hungary)
3 August 2016
19:45

Copenhagen (Denmark)	3–0	(Romania) Astra Giurgiu
Cornelius 14', 45+1'; Santander 34'	Report

Parken Stadium, Copenhagen
Attendance: 16,853
Referee: Liran Liany (Israel)

Copenhagen won 4–1 on aggregate.

26 July 2016
20:00

BATE Borisov (Belarus)	1–0	(Republic of Ireland) Dundalk
Gordeichuk 70'	Report

Borisov Arena, Barysaw
Attendance: 11,321
Referee: Yevhen Aranovskyi (Ukraine)
2 August 2016
21:00

Dundalk (Republic of Ireland)	3–0	(Belarus) BATE Borisov
McMillan 44', 59'; Benson 90'	Report

Tallaght Stadium, Tallaght (Note: Dundalk played their third qualifying round home match at Tallaght Stadium, Tallaght, and play-off round home match at Aviva Stadium, Dublin, instead of their regular stadium Oriel Park, Dundalk.)
Attendance: 4,645
Referee: Jakob Kehlet (Denmark)

Dundalk won 3–1 on aggregate.

26 July 2016
20:00

Ludogorets Razgrad (Bulgaria)	2–2	(Serbia) Red Star Belgrade
Cafú 43'; Keșerü 76'	Report	Katai 48'; Kanga 66'

Ludogorets Arena, Razgrad
Attendance: 7,759
Referee: Martin Strömbergsson (Sweden)
2 August 2016
20:30

Red Star Belgrade (Serbia)	2–4 (a.e.t.)	(Bulgaria) Ludogorets Razgrad
Donald 17'; Ibáñez 62' (pen.)	Report	Cafú 24'; Wanderson 40', 92', 97'

Red Star Stadium, Belgrade
Attendance: 50,223
Referee: Luca Banti (Italy)

Ludogorets Razgrad won 6–4 on aggregate.

26 July 2016
20:15

Partizani (Albania)	0–1	(Austria) Red Bull Salzburg
	Report	Soriano 70' (pen.)

Elbasan Arena, Elbasan
Attendance: 4,000
Referee: Michael Oliver (England)
3 August 2016
20:30

Red Bull Salzburg (Austria)	2–0	(Albania) Partizani
Soriano 76'; Wanderson 81'	Report

Red Bull Arena, Wals-Siezenheim
Attendance: 7,853
Referee: Ivan Kružliak (Slovakia)

Red Bull Salzburg won 3–0 on aggregate.

=== League Route matches ===
26 July 2016
20:45

Ajax (Netherlands)	1–1	(Greece) PAOK
Dolberg 58'	Report	Djalma 27'

Amsterdam Arena, Amsterdam
Attendance: 45,640
Referee: Xavier Estrada Fernández (Spain)
3 August 2016
20:30

PAOK (Greece)	1–2	(Netherlands) Ajax
Athanasiadis 4'	Report	Klaassen 45+1' (pen.), 88'

Toumba Stadium, Thessaloniki
Attendance: 24,930
Referee: Anthony Taylor (England)

Ajax won 3–2 on aggregate.

26 July 2016
20:00

Sparta Prague (Czech Republic)	1–1	(Romania) Steaua București
Šural 35'	Report	Stanciu 75'

Generali Arena, Prague
Attendance: 13,257
Referee: Daniel Siebert (Germany)
3 August 2016
19:45

Steaua București (Romania)	2–0	(Czech Republic) Sparta Prague
Stanciu 31', 63'	Report

Arena Națională, Bucharest
Attendance: 37,127
Referee: Danny Makkelie (Netherlands)

Steaua București won 3–1 on aggregate.

26 July 2016
20:45

Shakhtar Donetsk (Ukraine)	2–0	(Switzerland) Young Boys
Bernard 27'; Seleznyov 75'	Report

Arena Lviv, Lviv (Note: Shakhtar Donetsk played their home match at Arena Lviv, Lviv, instead of their regular stadium, the Donbas Arena in Donetsk, due to the war in Donbas.)
Attendance: 7,477
Referee: Serdar Gözübüyük (Netherlands)
3 August 2016
20:15

Young Boys (Switzerland)	2–0 (a.e.t.)	(Ukraine) Shakhtar Donetsk
Kubo 54', 60'	Report
Penalties
Hoarau (penalty scored); Kubo (penalty scored); Hadergjonaj (penalty missed); Rochat (penalty scored); Gajić (penalty scored)	4–2	(penalty scored) Srna; (penalty missed) Fred; (penalty missed) Rakitskiy; (penalty scored) Marlos

Stade de Suisse, Bern
Attendance: 9,365
Referee: Ruddy Buquet (France)

2–2 on aggregate; Young Boys won 4–2 on penalties.

26 July 2016
20:30

Rostov (Russia)	2–2	(Belgium) Anderlecht
Ezatolahi 16'; Poloz 60' (pen.)	Report	Hanni 3'; Tielemans 52'

Olimp-2, Rostov-on-Don
Attendance: 14,770
Referee: Luca Banti (Italy)
3 August 2016
20:45

Anderlecht (Belgium)	0–2	(Russia) Rostov
	Report	Noboa 28'; Azmoun 47'

Constant Vanden Stock Stadium, Brussels
Attendance: 19,464
Referee: Matej Jug (Slovenia)

Rostov won 4–2 on aggregate.

27 July 2016
20:30

Fenerbahçe (Turkey)	2–1	(France) Monaco
Emenike 39', 61'	Report	Falcao 42'

Şükrü Saracoğlu Stadium, Istanbul
Attendance: 12,223
Referee: Jesús Gil Manzano (Spain)
3 August 2016
20:45

Monaco (France)	3–1	(Turkey) Fenerbahçe
Germain 2', 65'; Falcao 18' (pen.)	Report	Emenike 53'

Stade Louis II, Monaco
Attendance: 8,403
Referee: Artur Soares Dias (Portugal)

Monaco won 4–3 on aggregate.

== Play-off round ==
=== Seeding ===
The play-off round was split into two separate sections: Champions Route (for league champions) and League Route (for league non-champions). The losing teams in both sections entered the 2016–17 UEFA Europa League group stage.

A total of 20 teams played in the play-off round:

- Champions Route: the ten Champions Route winners of the third qualifying round.
- League Route: five teams which entered in this round, and the five League Route winners of the third qualifying round.

The draw for the play-off round was held on 5 August 2016.

Champions Route		League Route	
Seeded	Unseeded	Seeded	Unseeded
(Czech Republic) Viktoria Plzeň (Austria) Red Bull Salzburg (Scotland) Celtic (Cyprus) APOEL (Poland) Legia Warsaw	(Croatia) Dinamo Zagreb (Bulgaria) Ludogorets Razgrad (Denmark) Copenhagen (Israel) Hapoel Be'er Sheva (Republic of Ireland) Dundalk	(England) Manchester City (Portugal) Porto (Spain) Villarreal (Netherlands) Ajax (Germany) Borussia Mönchengladbach	(Italy) Roma (Romania) Steaua București (France) Monaco (Switzerland) Young Boys (Russia) Rostov

=== Summary ===
The first legs were played on 16 and 17 August, and the second legs were played on 23 and 24 August 2016.

Team 1	Agg.	Team 2	1st leg	2nd leg
Champions Route
Ludogorets Razgrad (Bulgaria)	4–2	(Czech Republic) Viktoria Plzeň	2–0	2–2
Celtic (Scotland)	5–4	(Israel) Hapoel Be'er Sheva	5–2	0–2
Copenhagen (Denmark)	2–1	(Cyprus) APOEL	1–0	1–1
Dundalk (Republic of Ireland)	1–3	(Poland) Legia Warsaw	0–2	1–1
Dinamo Zagreb (Croatia)	3–2	(Austria) Red Bull Salzburg	1–1	2–1 (a.e.t.)
League Route
Steaua București (Romania)	0–6	(England) Manchester City	0–5	0–1
Porto (Portugal)	4–1	(Italy) Roma	1–1	3–0
Ajax (Netherlands)	2–5	(Russia) Rostov	1–1	1–4
Young Boys (Switzerland)	2–9	(Germany) Borussia Mönchengladbach	1–3	1–6
Villarreal (Spain)	1–3	(France) Monaco	1–2	0–1

=== Champions Route matches ===
17 August 2016
20:45

Ludogorets Razgrad (Bulgaria)	2–0	(Czech Republic) Viktoria Plzeň
Moți 51' (pen.); Misidjan 64'	Report

Vasil Levski National Stadium, Sofia (Note: Ludogorets Razgrad played their play-off round home match at Vasil Levski National Stadium, Sofia, instead of their regular stadium Ludogorets Arena, Razgrad.)
Attendance: 11,812
Referee: Mark Clattenburg (England)
23 August 2016
20:45

Viktoria Plzeň (Czech Republic)	2–2	(Bulgaria) Ludogorets Razgrad
Ďuriš 7'; Matějů 64'	Report	Misidjan 17'; Keșerü 90+5'

Doosan Arena, Plzeň
Attendance: 10,312
Referee: Alberto Undiano Mallenco (Spain)

Ludogorets Razgrad won 4–2 on aggregate.

17 August 2016
20:45

Celtic (Scotland)	5–2	(Israel) Hapoel Be'er Sheva
Rogic 9'; Griffiths 39', 45+1'; Dembélé 73'; Brown 85'	Report	Maranhão 55'; Melikson 57'

Celtic Park, Glasgow
Attendance: 52,659
Referee: Damir Skomina (Slovenia)
23 August 2016
20:45

Hapoel Be'er Sheva (Israel)	2–0	(Scotland) Celtic
Sahar 21'; Hoban 48'	Report

Turner Stadium, Be'er Sheva
Attendance: 15,383
Referee: Bas Nijhuis (Netherlands)

Celtic won 5–4 on aggregate.

16 August 2016
20:45

Copenhagen (Denmark)	1–0	(Cyprus) APOEL
Pavlović 43'	Report

Telia Parken Stadium, Copenhagen
Attendance: 20,519
Referee: Pavel Královec (Czech Republic)
24 August 2016
20:45

APOEL (Cyprus)	1–1	(Denmark) Copenhagen
Sotiriou 69'	Report	Santander 86'

GSP Stadium, Nicosia
Attendance: 17,310
Referee: Gianluca Rocchi (Italy)

Copenhagen won 2–1 on aggregate.

17 August 2016
20:45

Dundalk (Republic of Ireland)	0–2	(Poland) Legia Warsaw
	Report	Nikolić 56' (pen.); Prijović 90+4'

Aviva Stadium, Dublin
Attendance: 30,417
Referee: Deniz Aytekin (Germany)
23 August 2016
20:45

Legia Warsaw (Poland)	1–1	(Republic of Ireland) Dundalk
Kucharczyk 90+2'	Report	Benson 19'

Polish Army Stadium, Warsaw
Attendance: 29,066
Referee: Svein Oddvar Moen (Norway)

Legia Warsaw won 3–1 on aggregate.

16 August 2016
20:45

Dinamo Zagreb (Croatia)	1–1	(Austria) Red Bull Salzburg
Rog 76' (pen.)	Report	Lazaro 59'

Stadion Maksimir, Zagreb
Attendance: 13,784
Referee: Anastasios Sidiropoulos (Greece)
24 August 2016
20:45

Red Bull Salzburg (Austria)	1–2 (a.e.t.)	(Croatia) Dinamo Zagreb
Lazaro 22'	Report	Fernándes 87'; Soudani 95'

Red Bull Arena, Wals-Siezenheim
Attendance: 23,451
Referee: Craig Thomson (Scotland)

Dinamo Zagreb won 3–2 on aggregate.

=== League Route matches ===
16 August 2016
20:45

Steaua București (Romania)	0–5	(England) Manchester City
	Report	Silva 13'; Agüero 41', 78', 89'; Nolito 49'

Arena Națională, Bucharest
Attendance: 45,327
Referee: Daniele Orsato (Italy)
24 August 2016
20:45

Manchester City (England)	1–0	(Romania) Steaua București
Delph 56'	Report

City of Manchester Stadium, Manchester
Attendance: 40,064
Referee: Paweł Gil (Poland)

Manchester City won 6–0 on aggregate.

17 August 2016
20:45

Porto (Portugal)	1–1	(Italy) Roma
Silva 61' (pen.)	Report	Felipe 21' (o.g.)

Estádio do Dragão, Porto
Attendance: 46,310
Referee: Björn Kuipers (Netherlands)
23 August 2016
20:45

Roma (Italy)	0–3	(Portugal) Porto
	Report	Felipe 8'; Layún 73'; Corona 75'

Stadio Olimpico, Rome
Attendance: 39,866
Referee: Szymon Marciniak (Poland)

Porto won 4–1 on aggregate.

16 August 2016
20:45

Ajax (Netherlands)	1–1	(Russia) Rostov
Klaassen 38' (pen.)	Report	Noboa 13'

Amsterdam Arena, Amsterdam
Attendance: 51,463
Referee: Willie Collum (Scotland)
24 August 2016
20:45

Rostov (Russia)	4–1	(Netherlands) Ajax
Azmoun 34'; Yerokhin 52'; Noboa 60'; Poloz 66'	Report	Klaassen 84' (pen.)

Olimp-2, Rostov-on-Don
Attendance: 15,320
Referee: Milorad Mažić (Serbia)

Rostov won 5–2 on aggregate.

16 August 2016
20:45

Young Boys (Switzerland)	1–3	(Germany) Borussia Mönchengladbach
Sulejmani 56'	Report	Raffael 11'; Hahn 67'; Rochat 69' (o.g.)

Stade de Suisse, Bern
Attendance: 30,224
Referee: Nicola Rizzoli (Italy)
24 August 2016
20:45

Borussia Mönchengladbach (Germany)	6–1	(Switzerland) Young Boys
Hazard 9', 64', 84'; Raffael 33', 40', 77'	Report	Ravet 79'

Borussia-Park, Mönchengladbach
Attendance: 43,302
Referee: Andre Marriner (England)

Borussia Mönchengladbach won 9–2 on aggregate.

17 August 2016
20:45

Villarreal (Spain)	1–2	(France) Monaco
Pato 36'	Report	Fabinho 3' (pen.); Silva 72'

El Madrigal, Villarreal
Attendance: 19,516
Referee: Felix Brych (Germany)
23 August 2016
20:45

Monaco (France)	1–0	(Spain) Villarreal
Fabinho 90+1' (pen.)	Report

Stade Louis II, Monaco
Attendance: 8,750
Referee: Jonas Eriksson (Sweden)

Monaco won 3–1 on aggregate.

== Statistics ==
There were 239 goals scored in 92 matches in the qualifying phase and play-off round, for an average of 2.6 goals per match.

=== Top goalscorers ===
Rank	Player	Team	Goals	Minutes played
1	(Denmark) Andreas Cornelius	(Denmark) Copenhagen	5	434
1	(Hungary) Nemanja Nikolić	(Poland) Legia Warsaw	5	458
1	(Republic of Ireland) David McMillan	(Republic of Ireland) Dundalk	5	486
1	(Scotland) Leigh Griffiths	(Scotland) Celtic	5	507
5	(Brazil) Raffael	(Germany) Borussia Mönchengladbach	4	180
5	(Netherlands) Davy Klaassen	(Netherlands) Ajax	4	360
5	(Brazil) Wanderson	(Bulgaria) Ludogorets Razgrad	4	530

=== Top assists ===
Rank	Player	Team	Assists	Minutes played
1	(Bulgaria) Marcelinho	(Bulgaria) Ludogorets Razgrad	4	537
1	(Sweden) Ludwig Augustinsson	(Denmark) Copenhagen	4	540
3	(Brazil) Raffael	(Germany) Borussia Mönchengladbach	3	180
