= 2013 UEFA European Under-17 Championship elite round =

2013 UEFA European Under-17 Football Championship elite round was the second round of qualifications for the final tournament of UEFA U-17 Championship 2013. The 28 teams advancing from the qualifying round were distributed into seven groups of four teams each, with each group contesting in a round-robin format, with one of the four teams hosting all six group games. The seven group-winning teams automatically qualified for the final tournament in Slovakia.

== Seeding ==
The draw for the elite round was held on 5 December 2012. Each team was placed in one of four drawing pots, according to their qualifying round results. The seven sides with the best records were placed in Pot A, and so forth until Pot D, which contained the seven teams with the weakest records. During the draw, each group was filled with one team from every pot, with the only restriction being that teams that played each other in the first qualifying round can not be drawn into the same group again.

Pot A	Pot B	Pot C	Pot D
Germany; Serbia; Czech Republic; Hungary; Croatia; England; Norway	Ukraine; Switzerland; Republic of Ireland; Sweden; Netherlands; Slovenia; Belgium	Israel; Italy; Georgia; Bulgaria; Portugal; Spain; Finland	Russia; Poland; Belarus; Austria; Northern Ireland; France; Estonia

== Tiebreakers ==
If two or more teams are equal on points on completion of the group matches, the following criteria are applied to determine the rankings.

1. Higher number of points obtained in the group matches played among the teams in question
2. Superior goal difference from the group matches played among the teams in question
3. Higher number of goals scored in the group matches played among the teams in question
4. If, after applying criteria 1) to 3) to several teams, two teams still have an equal ranking, the criteria 1) to 3) will be reapplied to determine the ranking of these teams. If this procedure does not lead to a decision, criteria 5) and 6) will apply
5. Results of all group matches:
  1. Superior goal difference
  2. Higher number of goals scored
6. Drawing of lots

Additionally, if two teams which have the same number of points and the same number of goals scored and conceded play their last group match against each other and are still equal at the end of that match, their final rankings are determined by the penalty shoot-out and not by the criteria listed above. This procedure is applicable only if a ranking of the teams is required to determine the group winner.

== Group 1 ==
Pos	Team	Pld	W	D	L	GF	GA	GD	Pts	Qualification
1	Croatia (H)	3	2	1	0	5	3	+2	7	Final tournament
2	France	3	2	0	1	7	4	+3	6	
3	Spain	3	1	0	2	6	7	−1	3	
4	Belgium	3	0	1	2	3	7	−4	1	

(H) Hosts
21 March 2013
15:00

Croatia	3–2	Spain
Mamić 45'; Bašić 48'; Brodić 67'	Report	González 56'; Traoré 79'

Gradski stadion, Sinj
Referee: John Beaton (Scotland)
21 March 2013
15:00

Belgium	1–4	France
Schrijvers 64'	Report	Maupay 12', 33'; Coman 20'; Cornet 79'

Stadion Hrvatski vitezovi, Dugopolje
Referee: Kevin Azzopardi (Malta)

23 March 2013
15:00

Croatia	1–0	France
Coulibaly 7' (o.g.)	Report

Igralište Blato, Stobreč
Referee: Christian Dingert (Germany)
23 March 2013
15:00

Spain	2–1	Belgium
Pozo 3', 68'	Report	Pereira 48' (pen.)

Stadion Hrvatski vitezovi, Dugopolje
Referee: Kevin Azzopardi (Malta)

26 March 2013
15:00

Belgium	1–1	Croatia
Bourard 18'	Report	Ćaleta-Car 31'

Gradski stadion, Sinj
Referee: John Beaton (Scotland)
26 March 2013
15:00

France	3–2	Spain
Coulibaly 10'; Cornet 20'; Houri 79'	Report	Nuñez 28'; Chirivella 72' (pen.)

Stadion Pricviće, Žrnovnica
Referee: Christian Dingert (Germany)

== Group 2 ==
Pos	Team	Pld	W	D	L	GF	GA	GD	Pts	Qualification
1	Austria (H)	3	2	0	1	3	2	+1	6	Final tournament
2	Serbia	3	1	1	1	3	2	+1	4	
3	Republic of Ireland	3	1	1	1	2	4	−2	4	
4	Georgia	3	1	0	2	4	4	0	3	

(H) Hosts
25 March 2013
11:00

Serbia	2–0	Georgia
Stevanović 58'; Pantić 63'	Report

WFV Hirschstetten, Vienna
Referee: Sergiu Dereno (Moldova)
25 March 2013
19:00

Republic of Ireland	1–0	Austria
Grego-Cox 22'	Report

Sportzentrum Schwechat-Ranners, Schwechat
Referee: Marco Bruno Santos Ferreira (Portugal)

27 March 2013
11:00

Georgia	3–0	Republic of Ireland
Zarandia 54'; Kerdzevadze 62'; Chabradze 71'	Report

WFV Hirschstetten, Vienna
Referee: Sergiu Derenov (Moldova)
27 March 2013
19:00

Serbia	0–1	Austria
	Report	Pellegrini 70'

Sportzentrum Schwechat-Ranners, Schwechat
Referee: Yaroslav Kozyk (Ukraine)

30 March 2013
15:00

Republic of Ireland	1–1	Serbia
Byrne 50' (pen.)	Report	Radonjić 55'

WFV Hirschstetten, Vienna
Referee: Marco Bruno Santos Ferreira (Portugal)
30 March 2013
15:00

Austria	2–1	Georgia
Zivotic 14'; Grbic 24'	Report	Zarandia 38'

FAC Team Für Wien, Vienna
Referee: Yaroslav Kozyk (Ukraine)

== Group 3 ==
Pos	Team	Pld	W	D	L	GF	GA	GD	Pts	Qualification
1	Sweden	3	2	1	0	10	2	+8	7	Final tournament
2	Hungary (H)	3	2	1	0	7	3	+4	7	
3	Finland	2	0	0	2	2	8	−6	0	
4	Belarus	2	0	0	2	1	7	−6	0	

(H) Hosts
26 March 2013
14:30

Hungary	3–2	Finland
Rácz 37'; Zsótér 77'; Takács 80+4'	Report	Galibert 9'; Jääkeläinen 65'

Globall Football Park, Telki
Referee: Dejan Jakimovski (Macedonia)
26 March 2013
17:30

Sweden	4–1	Belarus
Berisha 20', 45'; Citaku 40'; Salétros 72'	Report	Kiyko 60'

Globall Football Park, Telki
Referee: Rahim Hasanov (Azerbaijan)

28 March 2013
14:00

Hungary	3–0	Belarus
Takács 46'; Szántó 55'; Zsótér 78' (pen.)	Report

Globall Football Park, Telki
Referee: Barış Şimşek (Turkey)
28 March 2013
16:45

Finland	0–5	Sweden
	Report	Lipovac 10', 20', 33'; Berisha 67', 79'

Globall Football Park, Telki
Referee: Dejan Jakimovski (Macedonia)

31 March 2013
14:30

Sweden	1–1	Hungary
Berisha 80+1'	Report	Korozmán 2'

Globall Football Park, Telki
Referee: Barış Şimşek (Turkey)
31 March 2013
14:30

Belarus	Match cancelled	Finland
	Report

Grosics Gyula, Tatabánya
Referee: Rahim Hasanov (Azerbaijan)

== Group 4 ==
Pos	Team	Pld	W	D	L	GF	GA	GD	Pts	Qualification
1	Ukraine	3	2	1	0	6	1	+5	7	Final tournament
2	Germany (H)	3	2	0	1	11	3	+8	6	
3	Bulgaria	3	1	1	1	6	6	0	4	
4	Estonia	3	0	0	3	2	15	−13	0	

(H) Hosts
26 March 2013
13:30

Ukraine	5–1	Estonia
Boryachuk 41', 58', 72'; Kuksenko 47' (pen.); Makohon 51'	Report	Liivak 28'

Tönnies-Arena, Rheda-Wiedenbrück
Referee: Aliyar Aghayev (Azerbaijan)
26 March 2013
16:00

Germany	5–2	Bulgaria
Werner 45'; Avdijaj 54'; Multhaup 60'; Waldschmidt 78', 80+1'	Report	Ivaylov 48'; Despodov 80'

Tönnies-Arena, Rheda-Wiedenbrück
Referee: Paweł Raczkowski (Poland)

28 March 2013
15:00

Germany	6–0	Estonia
Werner 2', 50', 52', 75'; Avdijaj 17'; Multhaup 27'	Report

Hembergstadion, Iserlohn
Referee: Aliyar Aghayev (Azerbaijan)
28 March 2013
18:00

Bulgaria	0–0	Ukraine
	Report

Montanhydraulik-Stadion, Holzwickede
Referee: Mervyn Smyth (Northern Ireland)

31 March 2013
15:00

Ukraine	1–0	Germany
Boryachuk 77'	Report

Wersestadion, Ahlen
Referee: Paweł Raczkowski (Poland)
31 March 2013
15:00

Estonia	1–4	Bulgaria
Ainsalu 35'	Report	Vutov 21', 50'; Despodov 56', 60'

Hembergstadion, Iserlohn
Referee: Mervyn Smyth (Northern Ireland)

== Group 5 ==
Pos	Team	Pld	W	D	L	GF	GA	GD	Pts	Qualification
1	Switzerland (H)	3	2	1	0	3	1	+2	7	Final tournament
2	Poland	3	1	2	0	3	2	+1	5	
3	Czech Republic	3	0	2	1	2	3	−1	2	
4	Israel	3	0	1	2	3	5	−2	1	

(H) Hosts
22 March 2013
14:00

Czech Republic	1–1	Israel
Danis 45'	Report	Ben Aharon 44'

Kleinholz, Olten
Referee: Sebastian Coltescu (Romania)
22 March 2013
17:00

Switzerland	0–0	Poland
	Report

Stadion Brühl, Grenchen
Referee: Tornike Gvantseladze (Georgia)

24 March 2013
14:00

Israel	1–2	Switzerland
Weissman 49'	Report	Hunziker 6'; Grgic 62' (pen.)

Kleinholz, Olten
Referee: Tornike Gvantseladze (Georgia)
24 March 2013
17:00

Czech Republic	1–1	Poland
Toml 69'	Report	Stolarski 25' (pen.)

Stadion Brühl, Grenchen
Referee: Andreas Pappas (Greece)

27 March 2013
18:00

Switzerland	1–0	Czech Republic
Hunziker 35'	Report

Stadion FC Solothurn, Solothurn
Referee: Andreas Pappas (Greece)
27 March 2013
18:00

Poland	2–1	Israel
Gałecki 51'; Zawada 80'	Report	Eiloz 65'

Kleinholz, Olten
Referee: Sebastian Coltescu (Romania)

== Group 6 ==
Pos	Team	Pld	W	D	L	GF	GA	GD	Pts	Qualification
1	Russia	3	2	0	1	4	3	+1	6	Final tournament
2	England (H)	3	2	0	1	4	3	+1	6	
3	Portugal	3	2	0	1	4	2	+2	6	
4	Slovenia	3	0	0	3	3	7	−4	0	

(H) Hosts
23 March 2013
15:00

Slovenia	1–2	Russia
Krivičić 80'	Report	Buranov 29'; Barinov 37'

St George's Park, Burton upon Trent
Referee: Svein-Erik Edvartsen (Norway)
23 March 2013
20:00

England	1–0	Portugal
Kiwomya 50'	Report

St George's Park, Burton upon Trent
Referee: Nicolas Rainville (France)

25 March 2013
15:00

Portugal	3–1	Slovenia
Ribeiro 33'; Martins 56'; Macedo 71'	Report	Ožbolt 49'

St George's Park, Burton upon Trent
Referee: Svein-Erik Edvartsen (Norway)
25 March 2013
20:00

England	1–2	Russia
Makarov 6' (o.g.)	Report	Guliyev 32'; Sheydayev 51'

Pirelli Stadium, Burton upon Trent
Referee: Mads-Kristoffer Kristoffersen (Denmark)

28 March 2013
16:00

Slovenia	1–2	England
Krivičić 68'	Report	Colkett 13'; Morris 28'

Pirelli Stadium, Burton upon Trent
Referee: Mads-Kristoffer Kristoffersen (Denmark)
28 March 2013
16:00

Russia	0–1	Portugal
	Report	Rui Moreira 60'

St George's Park, Burton upon Trent
Referee: Nicolas Rainville (France)

== Group 7 ==
Pos	Team	Pld	W	D	L	GF	GA	GD	Pts	Qualification
1	Italy	3	2	1	0	2	0	+2	7	Final tournament
2	Norway	3	1	1	1	3	3	0	4	
3	Netherlands (H)	3	0	2	1	3	4	−1	2	
4	Northern Ireland	3	0	2	1	3	4	−1	2	

(H) Hosts
21 March 2013
16:00

Norway	0–1	Italy
	Report	Cerri 23'

Sportpark In de Bandert, Echt
Referee: Peter Kralović (Slovakia)
21 March 2013
19:00

Netherlands	2–2	Northern Ireland
Souza 10'; Gronsveld 43'	Report	Kennedy 62'; Tracey 76'

Sportpark Parkzicht, Uden
Referee: Alexandr Aliyev (Kazakhstan)

23 March 2013
14:00

Norway	2–1	Northern Ireland
Skogvoll 10'; Bytyqi 44'	Report	Kennedy 33'

Sportpark Parkzicht, Uden
Referee: Peter Kralović (Slovakia)
23 March 2013
17:00

Italy	1–0	Netherlands
Cerri 78'	Report

Sportpark In de Bandert, Echt
Referee: Javier Estrada Fernández (Spain)

26 March 2013
19:00

Netherlands	1–1	Norway
Idrissi 77'	Report	Aasheim 32'

Sportpark Parkzicht, Uden
Referee: Alexandr Aliyev (Kazakhstan)
26 March 2013
19:00

Northern Ireland	0–0	Italy
	Report

Sportpark In de Bandert, Echt
Referee: Javier Estrada Fernández (Spain)

== Qualified nations ==
Country	Qualified as	Previous appearances in tournament^{1}
Slovakia	Hosts	**0** (debut)
Croatia	Group 1 winner	**1** (2005)
Austria	Group 2 winner	**2** (2003, 2004)
Sweden	Group 3 winner	**0** (debut)
Ukraine	Group 4 winner	**3** (2002, 2004, 2007)
Switzerland	Group 5 winner	**5** (**2002**, 2005, 2008, 2009, 2010)
Russia	Group 6 winner	**1** (**2006**)
Italy	Group 7 winner	**3** (2003, 2005, 2009)

^{1} Only counted appearances for under-17 era (bold indicates champion for that year, while italic indicates hosts)
