= Tarakanov =

Tarakanov, feminine Tarakanova (Russian: Тараканов, Тараканова) is a Russian surname belonging to the extinct Russian noble family of Tarakanovs. Although the surname superficially looks like derived from the word таракан, "cockroach", turkologist Nikolai Baskakov suggests that it is derived from the Turkic tar agan (tar-aqan), "fugitive", "wanderer", "pilgrim". (Similar etymologies are suggested for the word "tarakan" as well.)

Notable people with the surname include:

- Princess Tarakanova (1745-1775) a pretender to the Russian throne
- Anastasia Tarakanova
- Aleksey Tarakanov
- Nelli Tarakanova
- Nikolai Tarakanov
- Pavel Tarakanov
- Sergei Tarakanov
- Timofei Nikitich Tarakanov (1774-1834), Russian serf, explorer, and fur trader
- Valentyna Tarakanova
- Valeria Tarakanova
- Valery Tarakanov
- Yegor Tarakanov
