= 2016–17 UEFA Champions League =

European football tournament

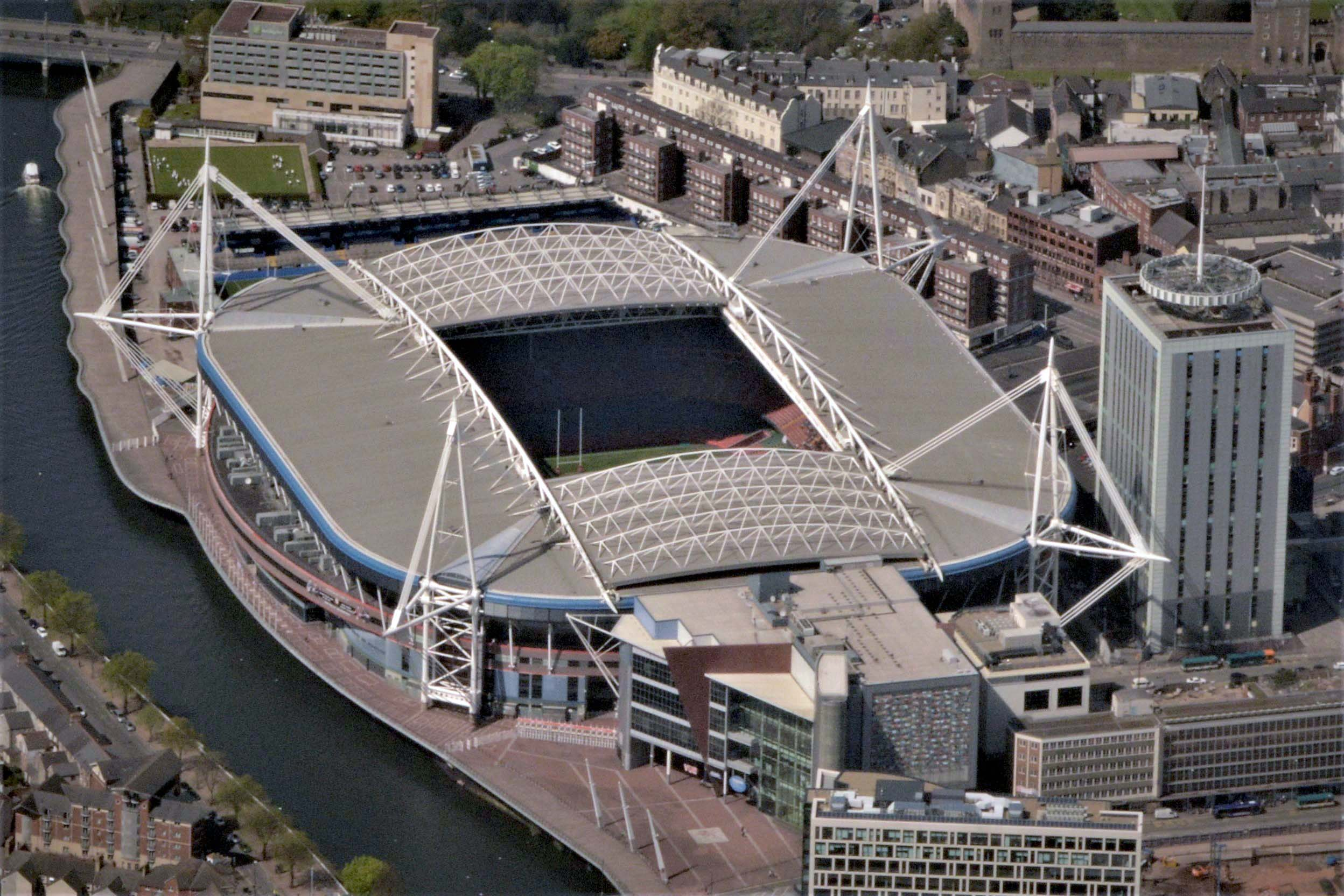
- The Millennium Stadium in Cardiff hosted the final

Tournament details
- Dates: Qualifying: 28 June – 24 August 2016; Competition proper: 13 September 2016 – 3 June 2017
- Teams: Competition proper: 32; Total: 78 (from 53 associations)

Final positions
- Champions: (Spain) Real Madrid (12th title)
- Runners-up: (Italy) Juventus

Tournament statistics
- Matches played: 125
- Goals scored: 380 (3.04 per match)
- Attendance: 5,399,802 (43,198 per match)
- Top scorer(s): Cristiano Ronaldo (Real Madrid); 12 goals
- Best players: Goalkeeper: Gianluigi Buffon (Juventus); Defender: Sergio Ramos (Real Madrid); Midfielder: Luka Modrić (Real Madrid); Forward: Cristiano Ronaldo (Real Madrid)

The 2016–17 UEFA Champions League was the 62nd season of Europe's premier club football tournament organised by UEFA, and the 25th season since it was renamed from the European Champion Clubs' Cup to the UEFA Champions League.

The final was played between Juventus and Real Madrid at the Millennium Stadium in Cardiff, Wales. It was the second time that the two teams faced each other in the competition's decisive match, having previously met in the 1998 final. Real Madrid, the defending champions, beat Juventus 4–1 to win a record-extending 12th title. With this victory, Real Madrid became the first team to successfully defend their title in the Champions League era, and the first to successfully defend a European Cup since Milan in 1990.

As winners, Real Madrid qualified as the UEFA representative for the 2017 FIFA Club World Cup in the United Arab Emirates, and also earned the right to play against the winners of the 2016–17 UEFA Europa League, Manchester United, in the 2017 UEFA Super Cup, ultimately triumphing in both competitions.

== Association team allocation ==
A total of 78 teams from 53 of the 55 UEFA member associations were expected to participate in the 2016–17 UEFA Champions League (the exceptions being Liechtenstein, which did not organise a domestic league, and Kosovo, whose participation was not accepted in their first attempt as UEFA members). The association ranking based on the UEFA country coefficients was used to determine the number of participating teams for each association:

- Associations 1–3 each had four teams qualify.
- Associations 4–6 each had three teams qualify.
- Associations 7–15 each had two teams qualify.
- Associations 16–54 (except Liechtenstein) each had one team qualify.
- The winners of the 2015–16 UEFA Champions League and 2015–16 UEFA Europa League were each given an additional entry if they did not qualify for the 2016–17 UEFA Champions League through their domestic league. Because a maximum of five teams from one association can enter the Champions League, if both the Champions League title holders and the Europa League title holders were from the same top three ranked association and finish outside the top four of their domestic league, the fourth-placed team of their association would be moved to the Europa League. For this season:
  - The winners of the 2015–16 UEFA Champions League, Real Madrid, qualified through their domestic league, meaning the additional entry for the Champions League title holders was not necessary.
  - The winners of the 2015–16 UEFA Europa League, Sevilla, did not qualify through their domestic league, meaning the additional entry for the Europa League title holders was necessary.

=== Association ranking ===
For the 2016–17 UEFA Champions League, the associations were allocated places according to their 2015 UEFA country coefficients, which took into account their performance in European competitions from 2010–11 to 2014–15.

Apart from the allocation based on the country coefficients, associations could have additional teams participating in the Champions League, as noted below:

- (EL) – Additional berth for Europa League title holders

Rank	Association	Coeff.	Teams	Notes
1	Spain	99.999	4	+1 (EL)
2	England	80.391	4	
3	Germany	79.415	4	
4	Italy	70.510	3	
5	Portugal	61.382	3	
6	France	52.416	3	
7	Russia	50.498	2	
8	Ukraine	45.166	2	
9	Netherlands	40.979	2	
10	Belgium	37.200	2	
11	Switzerland	34.375	2	
12	Turkey	32.600	2	
13	Greece	31.900	2	
14	Czech Republic	29.125	2	
15	Romania	26.299	2	
16	Austria	25.675	1	
17	Croatia	23.500	1	
18	Cyprus	22.300	1	
19	Poland	21.500	1	

Rank	Association	Coeff.	Teams	Notes
20	Israel	21.000	1	
21	Belarus	20.750	1	
22	Denmark	19.800	1	
23	Scotland	17.900	1	
24	Sweden	17.725	1	
25	Bulgaria	16.750	1	
26	Norway	14.375	1	
27	Serbia	13.875	1	
28	Slovenia	13.625	1	
29	Azerbaijan	12.500	1	
30	Slovakia	11.250	1	
31	Hungary	11.000	1	
32	Kazakhstan	10.375	1	
33	Moldova	10.000	1	
34	Georgia	9.375	1	
35	Finland	8.200	1	
36	Iceland	8.000	1	
37	Bosnia and Herzegovina	7.500	1	

Rank	Association	Coeff.	Teams	Notes
38	Liechtenstein	6.000	0	
39	Macedonia	5.875	1	
40	Republic of Ireland	5.750	1	
41	Montenegro	5.625	1	
42	Albania	5.375	1	
43	Luxembourg	5.125	1	
44	Northern Ireland	4.875	1	
45	Lithuania	4.500	1	
46	Latvia	4.250	1	
47	Malta	4.208	1	
48	Estonia	3.500	1	
49	Faroe Islands	3.500	1	
50	Wales	2.875	1	
51	Armenia	2.750	1	
52	Andorra	0.833	1	
53	San Marino	0.499	1	
54	Gibraltar	0.250	1	
55	Kosovo	0.000	0	

=== Distribution ===
In the default access list, the Champions League title holders enter the group stage. However, since Real Madrid already qualified for the group stage (as the runners-up of the 2015–16 La Liga), the Champions League title holders berth in the group stage is given to the Europa League title holders, Sevilla. and the following changes to the default allocation system are made:

- The third-placed teams of associations 4 (Italy) and 5 (Portugal) are promoted from the third qualifying round to the play-off round.

		Teams entering in this round	Teams advancing from previous round
First qualifying round (8 teams)		8 champions from associations 47–54	
Second qualifying round (34 teams)		30 champions from associations 16–46 (except Liechtenstein)	4 winners from the first qualifying round
Third qualifying round	Champions Route (20 teams)	3 champions from associations 13–15	17 winners from the second qualifying round
Third qualifying round	League Route (10 teams)	9 runners-up from associations 7–15; 1 third-placed team from association 6	
Play-off round	Champions Route (10 teams)		10 winners from the third qualifying round (Champions Route)
Play-off round	League Route (10 teams)	2 third-placed teams from associations 4–5; 3 fourth-placed teams from associations 1–3	5 winners from the third qualifying round (League Route)
Group stage (32 teams)		Europa League title holders; 12 champions from associations 1–12; 6 runners-up from associations 1–6; 3 third-placed teams from associations 1–3	5 winners from the play-off round (Champions Route); 5 winners from the play-off round (League Route)
Knockout phase (16 teams)			8 group winners from the group stage; 8 group runners-up from the group stage

=== Teams ===
League positions of the previous season qualified via league position shown in parentheses. Sevilla qualified as Europa League title holders. (TH: Champions League title holders; EL: Europa League title holders).

Group stage
(Spain) Real Madrid (2nd)^{TH}	(England) Tottenham Hotspur (3rd)	(Portugal) Benfica (1st)	(Netherlands) PSV Eindhoven (1st)
(Spain) Barcelona (1st)	(Germany) Bayern Munich (1st)	(Portugal) Sporting CP (2nd)	(Belgium) Club Brugge (1st)
(Spain) Atlético Madrid (3rd)	(Germany) Borussia Dortmund (2nd)	(France) Paris Saint-Germain (1st)	(Switzerland) Basel (1st)
(Spain) Sevilla (EL)	(Germany) Bayer Leverkusen (3rd)	(France) Lyon (2nd)	(Turkey) Beşiktaş (1st)
(England) Leicester City (1st)	(Italy) Juventus (1st)	(Russia) CSKA Moscow (1st)	
(England) Arsenal (2nd)	(Italy) Napoli (2nd)	(Ukraine) Dynamo Kyiv (1st)	
Play-off round
Champions Route	League Route		
	(Spain) Villarreal (4th)	(Germany) Borussia Mönchengladbach (4th)	(Portugal) Porto (3rd)
	(England) Manchester City (4th)	(Italy) Roma (3rd)	
Third qualifying round
Champions Route	League Route		
(Greece) Olympiacos (1st)	(France) Monaco (3rd)	(Belgium) Anderlecht (2nd)	(Czech Republic) Sparta Prague (2nd)
(Czech Republic) Viktoria Plzeň (1st)	(Russia) Rostov (2nd)	(Switzerland) Young Boys (2nd)	(Romania) Steaua București (2nd)
(Romania) Astra Giurgiu (1st)	(Ukraine) Shakhtar Donetsk (2nd)	(Turkey) Fenerbahçe (2nd)	
	(Netherlands) Ajax (2nd)	(Greece) PAOK (2nd)	
Second qualifying round
(Austria) Red Bull Salzburg (1st)	(Sweden) IFK Norrköping (1st)	(Kazakhstan) Astana (1st)	(Montenegro) Mladost Podgorica (1st)
(Croatia) Dinamo Zagreb (1st)	(Bulgaria) Ludogorets Razgrad (1st)	(Moldova) Sheriff Tiraspol (1st)	(Albania) Partizani (2nd)
(Cyprus) APOEL (1st)	(Norway) Rosenborg (1st)	(Georgia (country)) Dinamo Tbilisi (1st)	(Luxembourg) F91 Dudelange (1st)
(Poland) Legia Warsaw (1st)	(Serbia) Red Star Belgrade (1st)	(Finland) SJK (1st)	(Northern Ireland) Crusaders (1st)
(Israel) Hapoel Be'er Sheva (1st)	(Slovenia) Olimpija Ljubljana (1st)	(Iceland) FH (1st)	(Lithuania) Žalgiris (1st)
(Belarus) BATE Borisov (1st)	(Azerbaijan) Qarabağ (1st)	(Bosnia and Herzegovina) Zrinjski Mostar (1st)	(Latvia) Liepāja (1st)
(Denmark) Copenhagen (1st)	(Slovakia) Trenčín (1st)	(North Macedonia) Vardar (1st)	
(Scotland) Celtic (1st)	(Hungary) Ferencváros (1st)	(Republic of Ireland) Dundalk (1st)	
First qualifying round
(Malta) Valletta (1st)	(Faroe Islands) B36 (1st)	(Armenia) Alashkert (1st)	(San Marino) Tre Penne (1st)
(Estonia) Flora (1st)	(Wales) The New Saints (1st)	(Andorra) FC Santa Coloma (1st)	(Gibraltar) Lincoln Red Imps (1st)

Notes

1. Albania (ALB): Skënderbeu would have qualified for the Champions League second qualifying round as the champions of the 2015–16 Albanian Superliga, but were excluded from participating in the 2016–17 European competitions by UEFA for match-fixing. They appealed the decision to the Court of Arbitration for Sport, and UEFA agreed to suspend the exclusion and Skënderbeu were included in the second qualifying round draw. The final decision to exclude Skënderbeu was made by the Court of Arbitration for Sport on 6 July 2016, before the second qualifying round was played. As a result, the berth was given to the runners-up Partizani.
2. France (FRA): Monaco are a club based in Monaco (which is not a UEFA member), but participate in the Champions League through one of the berths for France as they finished third in the 2015–16 Ligue 1 (any coefficient points they earn count toward France).
3. Kosovo (KOS): Kosovo became a UEFA member on 3 May 2016. UEFA decided that their domestic champions could participate in the 2016–17 UEFA Champions League only if they could meet licensing criteria under article 15 of the UEFA Club Licensing & Financial Fair Play regulations, which would be confirmed following the assessment made by the UEFA administration within the deadline of 31 May 2016. However, Kosovo's entry, Feronikeli (as the champions of the 2015–16 Football Superleague of Kosovo), was denied by UEFA in June due to the club failing licensing requirements, and also because the club could not provide a suitable stadium and UEFA did not allow them to play their home matches in a foreign country.

== Round and draw dates ==
The schedule of the competition was as follows (all draws were held at the UEFA headquarters in Nyon, Switzerland, unless stated otherwise).

Phase	Round	Draw date	First leg	Second leg
Qualifying	First qualifying round	20 June 2016	28–29 June 2016	5–6 July 2016
Qualifying	Second qualifying round	20 June 2016	12–13 July 2016	19–20 July 2016
Qualifying	Third qualifying round	15 July 2016	26–27 July 2016	2–3 August 2016
Play-off	Play-off round	5 August 2016	16–17 August 2016	23–24 August 2016
Group stage	Matchday 1	25 August 2016 (Monaco)	13–14 September 2016	
Group stage	Matchday 2	25 August 2016 (Monaco)	27–28 September 2016	
Group stage	Matchday 3	25 August 2016 (Monaco)	18–19 October 2016	
Group stage	Matchday 4	25 August 2016 (Monaco)	1–2 November 2016	
Group stage	Matchday 5	25 August 2016 (Monaco)	22–23 November 2016	
Group stage	Matchday 6	25 August 2016 (Monaco)	6–7 December 2016	
Knockout phase	Round of 16	12 December 2016	14–15 & 21–22 February 2017	7–8 & 14–15 March 2017
Knockout phase	Quarter-finals	17 March 2017	11–12 April 2017	18–19 April 2017
Knockout phase	Semi-finals	21 April 2017	2–3 May 2017	9–10 May 2017
Knockout phase	Final	21 April 2017	3 June 2017 at Millennium Stadium, Cardiff	

== Qualifying rounds ==
In the qualifying rounds and the play-off round, teams were divided into seeded and unseeded teams based on their 2016 UEFA club coefficients, and then drawn into two-legged home-and-away ties. Teams from the same association could not be drawn against each other.

=== First qualifying round ===
The draws for the first and second qualifying rounds were held on 20 June 2016. The first legs were played on 28 June, and the second legs were played on 5 and 6 July 2016.

Team 1	Agg.	Team 2	1st leg	2nd leg
Flora (Estonia)	2–3	(Gibraltar) Lincoln Red Imps	2–1	0–2
The New Saints (Wales)	5–1	(San Marino) Tre Penne	2–1	3–0
Valletta (Malta)	2–2 (a)	(Faroe Islands) B36	1–0	1–2
FC Santa Coloma (Andorra)	0–3	(Armenia) Alashkert	0–0	0–3

=== Second qualifying round ===
The first legs were played on 12 and 13 July, and the second legs were played on 19 and 20 July 2016.

Team 1	Agg.	Team 2	1st leg	2nd leg
Qarabağ (Azerbaijan)	3–1	(Luxembourg) F91 Dudelange	2–0	1–1
Hapoel Be'er Sheva (Israel)	3–2	(Moldova) Sheriff Tiraspol	3–2	0–0
Olimpija Ljubljana (Slovenia)	6–6 (a)	(Slovakia) Trenčín	3–4	3–2
Red Bull Salzburg (Austria)	3–0	(Latvia) Liepāja	1–0	2–0
Vardar (North Macedonia)	3–5	(Croatia) Dinamo Zagreb	1–2	2–3
The New Saints (Wales)	0–3	(Cyprus) APOEL	0–0	0–3
Zrinjski Mostar (Bosnia and Herzegovina)	1–3	(Poland) Legia Warsaw	1–1	0–2
Ludogorets Razgrad (Bulgaria)	5–0	(Montenegro) Mladost Podgorica	2–0	3–0
Dinamo Tbilisi (Georgia (country))	3–1	(Armenia) Alashkert	2–0	1–1
Žalgiris (Lithuania)	1–2	(Kazakhstan) Astana	0–0	1–2
Partizani (Albania)	2–2 (3–1 p)	(Hungary) Ferencváros	1–1	1–1 (a.e.t.)
BATE Borisov (Belarus)	4–2	(Finland) SJK	2–0	2–2
Valletta (Malta)	2–4	(Serbia) Red Star Belgrade	1–2	1–2
Rosenborg (Norway)	5–4	(Sweden) IFK Norrköping	3–1	2–3
Dundalk (Republic of Ireland)	3–3 (a)	(Iceland) FH	1–1	2–2
Lincoln Red Imps (Gibraltar)	1–3	(Scotland) Celtic	1–0	0–3
Crusaders (Northern Ireland)	0–9	(Denmark) Copenhagen	0–3	0–6

=== Third qualifying round ===
The third qualifying round was split into two separate sections: Champions Route (for league champions) and League Route (for league non-champions). The losing teams in both sections entered the 2016–17 UEFA Europa League play-off round.

The draw for the third qualifying round was held on 15 July 2016. The first legs were played on 26 and 27 July, and the second legs were played on 2 and 3 August 2016.

Team 1	Agg.	Team 2	1st leg	2nd leg
Champions Route
Rosenborg (Norway)	2–4	(Cyprus) APOEL	2–1	0–3
Dinamo Zagreb (Croatia)	3–0	(Georgia (country)) Dinamo Tbilisi	2–0	1–0
Olympiacos (Greece)	0–1	(Israel) Hapoel Be'er Sheva	0–0	0–1
Astana (Kazakhstan)	2–3	(Scotland) Celtic	1–1	1–2
Trenčín (Slovakia)	0–1	(Poland) Legia Warsaw	0–1	0–0
Viktoria Plzeň (Czech Republic)	1–1 (a)	(Azerbaijan) Qarabağ	0–0	1–1
Astra Giurgiu (Romania)	1–4	(Denmark) Copenhagen	1–1	0–3
BATE Borisov (Belarus)	1–3	(Republic of Ireland) Dundalk	1–0	0–3
Ludogorets Razgrad (Bulgaria)	6–4	(Serbia) Red Star Belgrade	2–2	4–2 (a.e.t.)
Partizani (Albania)	0–3	(Austria) Red Bull Salzburg	0–1	0–2
League Route
Ajax (Netherlands)	3–2	(Greece) PAOK	1–1	2–1
Sparta Prague (Czech Republic)	1–3	(Romania) Steaua București	1–1	0–2
Shakhtar Donetsk (Ukraine)	2–2 (2–4 p)	(Switzerland) Young Boys	2–0	0–2 (a.e.t.)
Rostov (Russia)	4–2	(Belgium) Anderlecht	2–2	2–0
Fenerbahçe (Turkey)	3–4	(France) Monaco	2–1	1–3

== Play-off round ==
The play-off round was split into two separate sections: Champions Route (for league champions) and League Route (for league non-champions). The losing teams in both sections entered the 2016–17 UEFA Europa League group stage.

The draw for the play-off round was held on 5 August 2016. The first legs were played on 16 and 17 August, and the second legs were played on 23 and 24 August 2016.

Team 1	Agg.	Team 2	1st leg	2nd leg
Champions Route
Ludogorets Razgrad (Bulgaria)	4–2	(Czech Republic) Viktoria Plzeň	2–0	2–2
Celtic (Scotland)	5–4	(Israel) Hapoel Be'er Sheva	5–2	0–2
Copenhagen (Denmark)	2–1	(Cyprus) APOEL	1–0	1–1
Dundalk (Republic of Ireland)	1–3	(Poland) Legia Warsaw	0–2	1–1
Dinamo Zagreb (Croatia)	3–2	(Austria) Red Bull Salzburg	1–1	2–1 (a.e.t.)
League Route
Steaua București (Romania)	0–6	(England) Manchester City	0–5	0–1
Porto (Portugal)	4–1	(Italy) Roma	1–1	3–0
Ajax (Netherlands)	2–5	(Russia) Rostov	1–1	1–4
Young Boys (Switzerland)	2–9	(Germany) Borussia Mönchengladbach	1–3	1–6
Villarreal (Spain)	1–3	(France) Monaco	1–2	0–1

== Group stage ==
Location of teams of the 2016–17 UEFA Champions League group stage.
Brown: Group A; Red: Group B; Orange: Group C; Yellow: Group D;
Green: Group E; Blue: Group F; Purple: Group G; Pink: Group H.

The draw for the group stage was held on 25 August 2016, at the Grimaldi Forum in Monaco. The 32 teams were drawn into eight groups of four, with the restriction that teams from the same association could not be drawn against each other. For the draw, the teams were seeded into four pots based on the following principles (introduced starting 2015–16 season):

- Pot 1 contained the title holders and the champions of the top seven associations based on their 2015 UEFA country coefficients.
- Pot 2, 3 and 4 contained the remaining teams, seeded based on their 2016 UEFA club coefficients.

In each group, teams play against each other home-and-away in a round-robin format. The group winners and runners-up advance to the round of 16, while the third-placed teams enter the 2016–17 UEFA Europa League round of 32. The matchdays are 13–14 September, 27–28 September, 18–19 October, 1–2 November, 22–23 November, and 6–7 December 2016.

The youth teams of the clubs that qualify for the group stage also play in the 2016–17 UEFA Youth League on the same matchdays, where they compete in the UEFA Champions League Path (the youth domestic champions of the top 32 associations compete in a separate Domestic Champions Path until the play-offs).

A total of 17 national associations are represented in the group stage. Leicester City and Rostov made their debut appearances in the group stage. For the first time since the 2002–03 edition, England's Chelsea did not qualify for the group stage.

Tiebreakers
The teams are ranked according to points (3 points for a win, 1 point for a draw, 0 points for a loss). If two or more teams are equal on points on completion of the group matches, the following criteria are applied in the order given to determine the rankings (regulations Article 17.01):
1. higher number of points obtained in the group matches played among the teams in question;
2. superior goal difference from the group matches played among the teams in question;
3. higher number of goals scored in the group matches played among the teams in question;
4. higher number of goals scored away from home in the group matches played among the teams in question;
5. if, after having applied criteria 1 to 4, teams still have an equal ranking, criteria 1 to 4 are reapplied exclusively to the matches between the teams in question to determine their final rankings. If this procedure does not lead to a decision, criteria 6 to 12 apply;
6. superior goal difference in all group matches;
7. higher number of goals scored in all group matches;
8. higher number of away goals scored in all group matches;
9. higher number of wins in all group matches;
10. higher number of away wins in all group matches;
11. lower disciplinary points total based only on yellow and red cards received in all group matches (red card = 3 points, yellow card = 1 point, expulsion for two yellow cards in one match = 3 points);
12. higher club coefficient.

=== Group A ===
Pos	Team	Pld	W	D	L	GF	GA	GD	Pts	Qualification	ARS	PAR	LUD	BSL
1	(England) Arsenal	6	4	2	0	18	6	+12	14	Advance to knockout phase	—	2–2	6–0	2–0
2	(France) Paris Saint-Germain	6	3	3	0	13	7	+6	12	Advance to knockout phase	1–1	—	2–2	3–0
3	(Bulgaria) Ludogorets Razgrad	6	0	3	3	6	15	−9	3	Transfer to Europa League	2–3	1–3	—	0–0
4	(Switzerland) Basel	6	0	2	4	3	12	−9	2		1–4	1–2	1–1	—

Source: UEFA

=== Group B ===
Pos	Team	Pld	W	D	L	GF	GA	GD	Pts	Qualification	NAP	BEN	BES	DKV
1	(Italy) Napoli	6	3	2	1	11	8	+3	11	Advance to knockout phase	—	4–2	2–3	0–0
2	(Portugal) Benfica	6	2	2	2	10	10	0	8	Advance to knockout phase	1–2	—	1–1	1–0
3	(Turkey) Beşiktaş	6	1	4	1	9	14	−5	7	Transfer to Europa League	1–1	3–3	—	1–1
4	(Ukraine) Dynamo Kyiv	6	1	2	3	8	6	+2	5		1–2	0–2	6–0	—

Source: UEFA

=== Group C ===
Pos	Team	Pld	W	D	L	GF	GA	GD	Pts	Qualification	BAR	MCI	BMG	CEL
1	(Spain) Barcelona	6	5	0	1	20	4	+16	15	Advance to knockout phase	—	4–0	4–0	7–0
2	(England) Manchester City	6	2	3	1	12	10	+2	9	Advance to knockout phase	3–1	—	4–0	1–1
3	(Germany) Borussia Mönchengladbach	6	1	2	3	5	12	−7	5	Transfer to Europa League	1–2	1–1	—	1–1
4	(Scotland) Celtic	6	0	3	3	5	16	−11	3		0–2	3–3	0–2	—

Source: UEFA

=== Group D ===
Pos	Team	Pld	W	D	L	GF	GA	GD	Pts	Qualification	ATM	BAY	RST	PSV
1	(Spain) Atlético Madrid	6	5	0	1	7	2	+5	15	Advance to knockout phase	—	1–0	2–1	2–0
2	(Germany) Bayern Munich	6	4	0	2	14	6	+8	12	Advance to knockout phase	1–0	—	5–0	4–1
3	(Russia) Rostov	6	1	2	3	6	12	−6	5	Transfer to Europa League	0–1	3–2	—	2–2
4	(Netherlands) PSV Eindhoven	6	0	2	4	4	11	−7	2		0–1	1–2	0–0	—

Source: UEFA

=== Group E ===
Pos	Team	Pld	W	D	L	GF	GA	GD	Pts	Qualification	MON	LEV	TOT	CSKA
1	(France) Monaco	6	3	2	1	9	7	+2	11	Advance to knockout phase	—	1–1	2–1	3–0
2	(Germany) Bayer Leverkusen	6	2	4	0	8	4	+4	10	Advance to knockout phase	3–0	—	0–0	2–2
3	(England) Tottenham Hotspur	6	2	1	3	6	6	0	7	Transfer to Europa League	1–2	0–1	—	3–1
4	(Russia) CSKA Moscow	6	0	3	3	5	11	−6	3		1–1	1–1	0–1	—

Source: UEFA

=== Group F ===
Pos	Team	Pld	W	D	L	GF	GA	GD	Pts	Qualification	DOR	RMA	LEG	SPO
1	(Germany) Borussia Dortmund	6	4	2	0	21	9	+12	14	Advance to knockout phase	—	2–2	8–4	1–0
2	(Spain) Real Madrid	6	3	3	0	16	10	+6	12	Advance to knockout phase	2–2	—	5–1	2–1
3	(Poland) Legia Warsaw	6	1	1	4	9	24	−15	4	Transfer to Europa League	0–6	3–3	—	1–0
4	(Portugal) Sporting CP	6	1	0	5	5	8	−3	3		1–2	1–2	2–0	—

Source: UEFA

=== Group G ===
Pos	Team	Pld	W	D	L	GF	GA	GD	Pts	Qualification	LEI	POR	CPH	BRU
1	(England) Leicester City	6	4	1	1	7	6	+1	13	Advance to knockout phase	—	1–0	1–0	2–1
2	(Portugal) Porto	6	3	2	1	9	3	+6	11	Advance to knockout phase	5–0	—	1–1	1–0
3	(Denmark) Copenhagen	6	2	3	1	7	2	+5	9	Transfer to Europa League	0–0	0–0	—	4–0
4	(Belgium) Club Brugge	6	0	0	6	2	14	−12	0		0–3	1–2	0–2	—

Source: UEFA

=== Group H ===
Pos	Team	Pld	W	D	L	GF	GA	GD	Pts	Qualification	JUV	SEV	LYO	DZG
1	(Italy) Juventus	6	4	2	0	11	2	+9	14	Advance to knockout phase	—	0–0	1–1	2–0
2	(Spain) Sevilla	6	3	2	1	7	3	+4	11	Advance to knockout phase	1–3	—	1–0	4–0
3	(France) Lyon	6	2	2	2	5	3	+2	8	Transfer to Europa League	0–1	0–0	—	3–0
4	(Croatia) Dinamo Zagreb	6	0	0	6	0	15	−15	0		0–4	0–1	0–1	—

Source: UEFA

== Knockout phase ==
In the knockout phase, teams play against each other over two legs on a home-and-away basis, except for the one-match final. The mechanism of the draws for each round is as follows:

- In the draw for the round of 16, the eight group winners are seeded, and the eight group runners-up are unseeded. The seeded teams are drawn against the unseeded teams, with the seeded teams hosting the second leg. Teams from the same group or the same association cannot be drawn against each other.
- In the draws for the quarter-finals onwards, there are no seedings, and teams from the same group or the same association can be drawn against each other.

=== Bracket ===
Round of 16
(Portugal) Benfica	1	0	1
(Germany) Borussia Dortmund	0	4	4
(England) Manchester City	5	1	6
(France) Monaco (a)	3	3	6
(Portugal) Porto	0	0	0
(Italy) Juventus	2	1	3
(France) Paris Saint-Germain	4	1	5
(Spain) Barcelona	0	6	6
(Germany) Bayern Munich	5	5	10
(England) Arsenal	1	1	2
(Spain) Real Madrid	3	3	6
(Italy) Napoli	1	1	2
(Germany) Bayer Leverkusen	2	0	2
(Spain) Atlético Madrid	4	0	4
(Spain) Sevilla	2	0	2
(England) Leicester City	1	2	3

Quarter-finals
(Germany) Borussia Dortmund	2	1	3
(France) Monaco	3	3	6
(Italy) Juventus	3	0	3
(Spain) Barcelona	0	0	0
(Germany) Bayern Munich	1	2	3
(Spain) Real Madrid (a.e.t.)	2	4	6
(Spain) Atlético Madrid	1	1	2
(England) Leicester City	0	1	1

Semi-finals
(France) Monaco	0	1	1
(Italy) Juventus	2	2	4
(Spain) Real Madrid	3	1	4
(Spain) Atlético Madrid	0	2	2

Final
3 June – Cardiff
(Italy) Juventus	1
(Spain) Real Madrid	4

=== Round of 16 ===
The draw for the round of 16 was held on 12 December 2016. The first legs were played on 14, 15, 21 and 22 February, and the second legs were played on 7, 8, 14 and 15 March 2017.

Team 1	Agg.	Team 2	1st leg	2nd leg
Manchester City (England)	6–6 (a)	(France) Monaco	5–3	1–3
Real Madrid (Spain)	6–2	(Italy) Napoli	3–1	3–1
Benfica (Portugal)	1–4	(Germany) Borussia Dortmund	1–0	0–4
Bayern Munich (Germany)	10–2	(England) Arsenal	5–1	5–1
Porto (Portugal)	0–3	(Italy) Juventus	0–2	0–1
Bayer Leverkusen (Germany)	2–4	(Spain) Atlético Madrid	2–4	0–0
Paris Saint-Germain (France)	5–6	(Spain) Barcelona	4–0	1–6
Sevilla (Spain)	2–3	(England) Leicester City	2–1	0–2

=== Quarter-finals ===
The draw for the quarter-finals was held on 17 March 2017. The first legs were played on 11 and 12 April, and the second legs were played on 18 and 19 April 2017.

Team 1	Agg.	Team 2	1st leg	2nd leg
Atlético Madrid (Spain)	2–1	(England) Leicester City	1–0	1–1
Borussia Dortmund (Germany)	3–6	(France) Monaco	2–3	1–3
Bayern Munich (Germany)	3–6	(Spain) Real Madrid	1–2	2–4 (a.e.t.)
Juventus (Italy)	3–0	(Spain) Barcelona	3–0	0–0

=== Semi-finals ===
The draw for the semi-finals was held on 21 April 2017. The first legs were played on 2 and 3 May, and the second legs were played on 9 and 10 May 2017.

Team 1	Agg.	Team 2	1st leg	2nd leg
Real Madrid (Spain)	4–2	(Spain) Atlético Madrid	3–0	1–2
Monaco (France)	1–4	(Italy) Juventus	0–2	1–2

=== Final ===
The final was played on 3 June 2017 at Millennium Stadium in Cardiff, Wales. The "home" team (for administrative purposes) was determined by an additional draw held after the semi-final draw.

3 June 2017
19:45 UTC+1

Juventus (Italy)	1–4	(Spain) Real Madrid
Mandžukić 27'	Report	Ronaldo 20', 64'; Casemiro 61'; Asensio 90'

Millennium Stadium, Cardiff
Attendance: 65,842
Referee: Felix Brych (Germany)

== Statistics ==
Statistics exclude qualifying rounds and play-off round.

=== Top goalscorers ===
Rank	Player	Team	Goals	Minutes played
1	(Portugal) Cristiano Ronaldo	(Spain) Real Madrid	12	1200
2	(Argentina) Lionel Messi	(Spain) Barcelona	11	810
3	(Uruguay) Edinson Cavani	(France) Paris Saint-Germain	8	720
3	(Poland) Robert Lewandowski	(Germany) Bayern Munich	8	794
5	(Gabon) Pierre-Emerick Aubameyang	(Germany) Borussia Dortmund	7	708
6	(France) Kylian Mbappé	(France) Monaco	6	536
6	(France) Antoine Griezmann	(Spain) Atlético Madrid	6	1068
8	(Argentina) Sergio Agüero	(England) Manchester City	5	541
8	(Belgium) Dries Mertens	(Italy) Napoli	5	571
8	(Colombia) Radamel Falcao	(France) Monaco	5	666
8	(France) Karim Benzema	(Spain) Real Madrid	5	954
8	(Argentina) Gonzalo Higuaín	(Italy) Juventus	5	1039

=== Top assists ===
Rank	Player	Team	Assists	Minutes played
1	(Brazil) Neymar	(Spain) Barcelona	8	797
2	(Portugal) Cristiano Ronaldo	(Spain) Real Madrid	6	1200
3	(France) Ousmane Dembélé	(Germany) Borussia Dortmund	5	769
3	(Spain) Dani Carvajal	(Spain) Real Madrid	5	975
5	(France) Benjamin Mendy	(France) Monaco	4	525
5	(England) Raheem Sterling	(England) Manchester City	4	577
5	(Argentina) Eduardo Salvio	(Portugal) Benfica	4	628
5	(France) Thomas Lemar	(France) Monaco	4	895

=== Squad of the season ===
The UEFA technical study group selected the following 18 players as the squad of the tournament.

Pos.	Player	Team
GK	(Italy) Gianluigi Buffon	(Italy) Juventus
GK	(Slovenia) Jan Oblak	(Spain) Atlético Madrid
DF	(Uruguay) Diego Godín	(Spain) Atlético Madrid
DF	(Italy) Leonardo Bonucci	(Italy) Juventus
DF	(Spain) Dani Carvajal	(Spain) Real Madrid
DF	(Spain) Sergio Ramos	(Spain) Real Madrid
DF	(Brazil) Marcelo	(Spain) Real Madrid
MF	(Brazil) Casemiro	(Spain) Real Madrid
MF	(Germany) Toni Kroos	(Spain) Real Madrid
MF	(Croatia) Luka Modrić	(Spain) Real Madrid
MF	(Spain) Isco	(Spain) Real Madrid
MF	(Bosnia and Herzegovina) Miralem Pjanić	(Italy) Juventus
MF	(France) Tiémoué Bakayoko	(France) Monaco
FW	(France) Antoine Griezmann	(Spain) Atlético Madrid
FW	(Argentina) Lionel Messi	(Spain) Barcelona
FW	(Portugal) Cristiano Ronaldo	(Spain) Real Madrid
FW	(Poland) Robert Lewandowski	(Germany) Bayern Munich
FW	(France) Kylian Mbappé	(France) Monaco

=== Players of the season ===
New UEFA Champions League Goalkeeper of the Season, Defender of the Season, Midfielder of the Season, and Forward of the Season positional awards were introduced for the 2016–17 season. Votes were cast by coaches of the 32 teams in the group stage, together with 55 journalists selected by the European Sports Media (ESM) group, representing each of UEFA's member associations. The coaches were not allowed to vote for players from their own teams. Jury members selected their top three players, with the first receiving five points, the second three and the third one. The shortlist of the top three players were announced on 4 August 2017. The award winners were announced and presented during the 2017–18 UEFA Champions League group stage draw in Monaco on 24 August 2017.

==== Goalkeeper of the season ====
Rank	Player	Team	Points
Shortlist of top three
1	(Italy) Gianluigi Buffon	(Italy) Juventus	342
2	(Slovenia) Jan Oblak	(Spain) Atlético Madrid	128
3	(Germany) Manuel Neuer	(Germany) Bayern Munich	105
Players ranked 4–10
4	(Costa Rica) Keylor Navas	(Spain) Real Madrid	67
5	(Denmark) Kasper Schmeichel	(England) Leicester City	16
6	(Germany) Marc-André ter Stegen	(Spain) Barcelona	7
7	(Croatia) Danijel Subašić	(France) Monaco	6
8	(Portugal) Anthony Lopes	(France) Lyon	5
9	(Switzerland) Roman Bürki	(Germany) Borussia Dortmund	1
9	(Spain) Iker Casillas	(Portugal) Porto	1
9	(Brazil) Ederson	(Portugal) Benfica	1
9	(France) Hugo Lloris	(England) Tottenham Hotspur	1
9	(Spain) Pepe Reina	(Italy) Napoli	1

==== Defender of the season ====
Rank	Player	Team	Points
Shortlist of top three
1	(Spain) Sergio Ramos	(Spain) Real Madrid	206
2	(Italy) Leonardo Bonucci	(Italy) Juventus	150
3	(Brazil) Marcelo	(Spain) Real Madrid	109
Players ranked 4–10
4	(Italy) Giorgio Chiellini	(Italy) Juventus	71
5	(Brazil) Dani Alves	(Italy) Juventus	50
6	(Uruguay) Diego Godín	(Spain) Atlético Madrid	16
7	(Germany) Philipp Lahm	(Germany) Bayern Munich	14
8	(Spain) Dani Carvajal	(Spain) Real Madrid	13
9	(Spain) Gerard Piqué	(Spain) Barcelona	12
10	(France) Benjamin Mendy	(France) Monaco	9

==== Midfielder of the season ====
Rank	Player	Team	Points
Shortlist of top three
1	(Croatia) Luka Modrić	(Spain) Real Madrid	225
2	(Germany) Toni Kroos	(Spain) Real Madrid	164
3	(Brazil) Casemiro	(Spain) Real Madrid	38
Players ranked 4–10
4	(Bosnia and Herzegovina) Miralem Pjanić	(Italy) Juventus	33
5	(Spain) Thiago Alcântara	(Germany) Bayern Munich	25
6	(Portugal) Bernardo Silva	(France) Monaco	21
7	(Spain) Andrés Iniesta	(Spain) Barcelona	15
8	(Brazil) Fabinho	(France) Monaco	12
9	(Spain) Isco	(Spain) Real Madrid	10
9	(Chile) Arturo Vidal	(Germany) Bayern Munich	10

==== Forward of the season ====
Rank	Player	Team	Points
Shortlist of top three
1	(Portugal) Cristiano Ronaldo	(Spain) Real Madrid	359
2	(Argentina) Lionel Messi	(Spain) Barcelona	147
3	(Argentina) Paulo Dybala	(Italy) Juventus	64
Players ranked 4–10
4	(France) Kylian Mbappé	(France) Monaco	58
5	(Poland) Robert Lewandowski	(Germany) Bayern Munich	24
6	(Brazil) Neymar	(Spain) Barcelona	21
7	(France) Antoine Griezmann	(Spain) Atlético Madrid	14
8	(Argentina) Gonzalo Higuaín	(Italy) Juventus	8
9	(Uruguay) Edinson Cavani	(France) Paris Saint-Germain	6
10	(Croatia) Mario Mandžukić	(Italy) Juventus	5

== See also ==
- 2016–17 UEFA Europa League
- 2017 UEFA Super Cup
- 2017 FIFA Club World Cup
- 2016–17 UEFA Women's Champions League
- 2016–17 UEFA Youth League
