= Tarakanovo =

Tarakanovo Тараканово
- Selo
- Location within Perm Krai Location within Russia
- Coordinates: 57°41′N 54°48′E
- Country: Russia
- Region: Perm Krai
- District: Bolshesosnovsky District
- Time zone: UTC+5:00

Tarakanovo (Russian: Тараканово) is a rural locality (a selo) in Levinskoye Rural Settlement, Bolshesosnovsky District, Perm Krai, Russia. The population was 123 as of 2010. There are 4 streets.

== Geography ==
Tarakanovo is located 15 km east of Bolshaya Sosnova (the district's administrative centre) by road. Yuzhny is the nearest rural locality.
