= Paweł Raczkowski =

Polish football referee (born 1983)

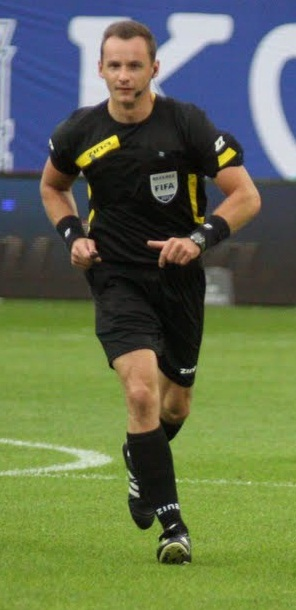
- Raczkowski in 2013
- Full name: Paweł Krzysztof Raczkowski
- Born: 10 May 1983 (age 43); Warsaw, Poland

Domestic
Years	League	Role
2010–	Ekstraklasa	Referee

International
Years	League	Role
2013–	FIFA listed	Referee

Paweł Krzysztof Raczkowski (born 10 May 1983) is a Polish football referee who officiates in the Ekstraklasa. He has been a FIFA referee since 2013, and is ranked as a UEFA first category referee.

== Refereeing career ==
In 2010, Raczkowski began officiating in the Ekstraklasa. His first match as referee was on 8 August 2010 between Śląsk Wrocław and Jagiellonia Białystok.

In 2013, he was put on the FIFA referees list. His first match as a FIFA referee came on 26 March 2013 between Germany and Bulgaria in the 2013 UEFA European Under-17 Championship elite round. Raczkowski refereed his first UEFA club competition match on 18 July 2013 in the Europa League second qualifying round between Irtysh Pavlodar and Široki Brijeg.

He officiated his first senior international match on 27 May 2014 between Japan and Cyprus. Raczkowski was selected as an official for the 2015 UEFA European Under-17 Championship, his first national team tournament as referee. In March 2016, he was selected as an additional assistant referee for UEFA Euro 2016.

His first competitive international as referee was on 10 October 2016 between Gibraltar and Belgium in 2018 FIFA World Cup qualification.

In 2019, he was selected to officiate in the 2019 Polish Super Cup between Piast Gliwice and Lechia Gdańsk. Raczkowski has officiated matches in various other countries, including Japan (in the 2014 J.League Division 1), Moldova (for the 2016 Moldovan Cup Final), Saudi Arabia (in the Saudi Professional League and King Cup) and Türkiye (as VAR in Süper Lig).
