= Ņikita Koļesovs =

Latvian footballer

Personal information
- Date of birth: 25 September 1996 (age 30)
- Height: 1.94 m (6 ft 4 1/2 in)
- Position: Defender

Youth career
- FK Ventspils

Senior career*
| Years | Team | Apps | (Gls) |
| 2013–2015 | FK Ventspils II | | |
| 2015–2019 | FK Ventspils | 75 | (1) |
| 2019 | Botoșani | 2 | (0) |

International career^{‡}
| 2012–2013 | Latvia U-17 | 3 | (0) |
| 2013–2014 | Latvia U-18 | 3 | (0) |
| 2014 | Latvia U-19 | 6 | (0) |
| 2015–2017 | Latvia U-21 | 10 | (2) |
| 2017– | Latvia | 6 | (0) |
- * Club domestic league appearances and goals as of 13 January 2020 ‡ National team caps and goals as of 10 October 2017

Ņikita Koļesovs (born 25 September 1996) is a Latvian football player.

== International ==
He made his debut for the Latvia national football team on 9 June 2017 in a World Cup qualifier group game against Portugal.
