= Hanus Thorleifsson =

Faroese footballer

Personal information
- Date of birth: 19 December 1985 (age 40)
- Height: 1.75 m (5 ft 9 in)
- Position: Right midfielder

Senior career*
Years	Team	Apps	(Gls)
2002–2005	Skála ÍF	68	(7)
2006–2009	B36 Tórshavn	86	(13)
2009–2012	HB Tórshavn	33	(4)
2013	ÍF Fuglafjørður	16	(1)
2014–2016	B36 Tórshavn	67	(9)
2017	Giza Hoyvík	8	(2)

International career^{‡}
2001	U17 Faroe Islands	6	(0)
2002–2003	U19 Faroe Islands	6	(0)
2006–	Faroe Islands	3	(0)
- * Club domestic league appearances and goals as of 11 November 2015 ‡ National team caps and goals as of 11 November 2015

Hanus Thorleifsson (born 19 December 1985) is a Faroese footballer, currently a free agent. Previously he played for Skála ÍF, HB Tórshavn, ÍF Fuglafjørður, B36 Tórshavn and Giza Hoyvík. Thorleifsson has been capped for the Faroe Islands national football team at senior and junior level.

== Club career ==
Thorleifsson begun his professional career with Skála ÍF in 2002. Until 2006 he played in 68 matches and scored 7 goals with the club in the Faroe Islands Premier League. In November 2005 he transferred to B36 Tórshavn. Thorleifsson was in the starting line-up of B36 in the 2006 Faroe Islands Cup final, where his team won the trophy by winning 2–1 versus KÍ. Following reports about leaving B36, he moved to rivals HB Tórshavn in the summer of 2009.

In January 2013 he moved to ÍF Fuglafjørður. In February 2014 Thorleifsson returned for a second spell in B36, after leaving the club in 2009. In 2015 Thorleifsson helped B36 win back-to-back championships for the first time in the club's history by scoring the winning goal against TB Tvøroyri.

== International career ==
Thorleifsson made his senior debut for the Faroe Islands in a 6–0 away defeat against Scotland, coming in as a substitute for Jónhard Frederiksberg. Totally he has been capped 3 times for the Faroe Islands at senior level.

== Honours ==
B36 Tórshavn

- Faroe Islands Premier League (2): 2014, 2015,
- Faroe Islands Cup (1): 2006

HB Tórshavn

- Faroe Islands Premier League (2): 2009, 2010,
