= Michał Gałecki =

Polish footballer (born 1996)

Personal information
- Date of birth: 27 January 1996 (age 30)
- Place of birth: Rydułtowy, Poland
- Height: 1.75 m (5 ft 9 in)
- Position: Midfielder

Team information
- Current team: Sparta Żory
- Number: 7

Youth career
- Gosław Jedłownik
- 2009–2010: Naprzód Czyżowice
- 2011–2012: Arka Gdynia

Senior career*
Years	Team	Apps	(Gls)
2012–2015	Arka Gdynia II	36	(5)
2013–2015	Arka Gdynia	9	(0)
2014	→ Rozwój Katowice (loan)	12	(0)
2015–2016	Rozwój Katowice	21	(1)
2016–2018	Sandecja Nowy Sącz	30	(2)
2018–2019	Motor Lublin	31	(2)
2019–2021	GKS Katowice	61	(5)
2021–2022	KSZO Ostrowiec	15	(1)
2022	Podhale Nowy Targ	8	(0)
2022–2023	Odra Wodzisław Śląski	15	(5)
2023–2024	Unia Turza Śląska	48	(16)
2024–	Sparta Żory	22	(29)

International career
2012–2013	Poland U17	11	(2)
2013–2014	Poland U18	6	(0)
2013	Poland U19	1	(0)
- * Club domestic league appearances and goals as of 22:19, 23 June 2025 (UTC)

Michał Gałecki (born 27 January 1996) is a Polish professional footballer who plays as a midfielder for Klasa A club Sparta Żory.

== Club career ==
Gałecki began his career at Gosław Jedłownik and Naprzód Czyżowice. In 2011, he joined Arka Gdynia youth team, and in November 2012 he played reserve team football. On 11 May 2013, he made his I liga debut at the Stadion GOSiR, in a 3–1 win against Okocimski KS Brzesko. In August 2013, he had a trial spell with Football League Championship club Watford. On 31 January 2014, he signed for II liga side Rozwój Katowice on loan until the end of the 2013–14 season.

On 11 August 2015, Gałecki moved to newly promoted Rozwój on a permanent deal, for whom he played for one season. In July 2016, he signed a contract with I liga club Sandecja Nowy Sącz, where he became part of the squad that earned promotion to Ekstraklasa for the first time in club's history. He made his Ekstraklasa debut on 21 October 2017 in a 1–1 home draw against Cracovia.

On 21 July 2018, he signed a contract with Motor Lublin. On 13 June 2019 he joined II liga club GKS Katowice.

On 30 July 2022, after spells at KSZO Ostrowiec and Podhale Nowy Targ, Gałecki joined III liga club Odra Wodzisław Śląski.

On 3 March 2023, Gałecki moved to fifth division side Unia Turza Śląska for an undisclosed fee.

== International career ==
Gałecki has represented Poland from under-17 to under-19 level. He made his first and only appearance for the Poland national under-19 football team on 10 October 2013 in a friendly home match to Lithuania in Inowrocław.

== Honours ==
Sandecja Nowy Sącz

- I liga: 2016–17

Motor Lublin

- Polish Cup (Lublin subdistrict regionals): 2018–19

Unia Turza Śląska

- IV liga Silesia II: 2022–23

Sparta Żory

- Klasa B Rybnik II: 2024–25
