= Stef Gronsveld =

Dutch footballer

Personal information
- Date of birth: 11 January 1996 (age 30)
- Place of birth: Delft, Netherlands
- Height: 1.73 m (5 ft 8 in)
- Position: Right back

Youth career
- Vitesse Delft
- 2014–2015: Feyenoord

Senior career*
Years	Team	Apps	(Gls)
2015–2016	Feyenoord	0	(0)
2016–2019	FC Emmen	23	(2)
2019–2020	FC Dordrecht	13	(1)

International career
2012–2013	Netherlands U17	7	(1)
- * Club domestic league appearances and goals

Stef Gronsveld (born 11 January 1996) is a Dutch retired footballer who played as a right back.

== Club career ==
Born in Delft, Gronsveld started his youth career with the academy of local Vitesse Delft. In April 2014, he joined the academy of Feyenoord. In June 2015, he was promoted to the senior team and was issued the 25 number jersey. He made his debut in a pre-season friendly game against Heerenveen, but suffered a hamstring injury in the first half and was ruled out of play for almost the entire season. He managed to recover in the following April.

After having played no competitive match for Feyenoord, Gronsveld joined FC Emmen on a two-year deal on 10 June 2016. However, in the following month, it was announced that he had undergone a hip surgery and was ruled out of play for four months. On 13 January 2018, he made his first team debut against FC Eindhoven. On 9 May 2018, his contract was extended for another year.

After playing for FC Dordrecht in the 2019–20 season and missing the second half of the season due to a hip injury, he retired from playing football to continue his education. Gronsveld later explained that his career had been ended by osteoarthritis in his hip, which was diagnosed after hip problems worsened during the 2019–20 season. By 2022 he was studying public administration in Rotterdam and had completed an internship in Cape Town, South Africa.

== International career ==
Gronsveld played 7 games for the Netherlands national under-21 football team

== Career statistics ==
As of match played on 17 May 2018

Club	Season	League			Cup		Other		Total	
Club	Season	Division	Apps	Goals	Apps	Goals	Apps	Goals	Apps	Goals
Feyenoord	2015–16	Eredivisie	0	0	0	0	0	0	0	0
FC Emmen	2016–17	Eerste Divisie	0	0	0	0	—		0	0
FC Emmen	2017–18	Eerste Divisie	11	1	0	0	3	0	14	1
FC Emmen	Total		11	1	0	0	3	0	14	1
Career total			11	1	0	0	3	0	14	1
