= Aarón Sánchez (footballer) =

Andorran footballer (born 1996)

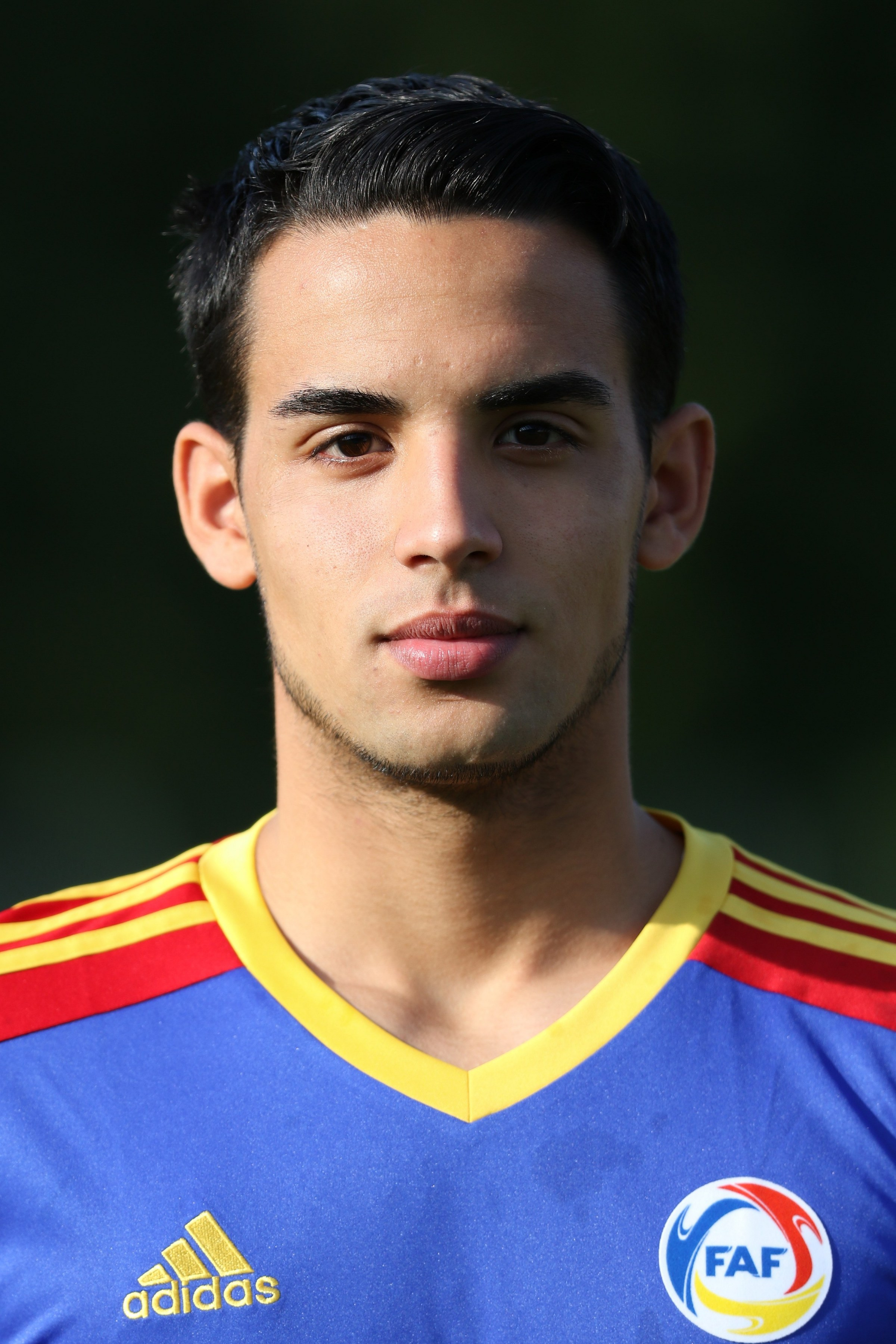

Personal information
- Full name: Aarón Sánchez Alburquerque
- Date of birth: 5 June 1996 (age 30)
- Place of birth: Salamanca, Spain
- Height: 1.83 m (6 ft 0 in)
- Position: Forward

Team information
- Current team: La Massana
- Number: 9

Youth career
- Almería
- –2013: FC Andorra
- 2013–2014: Los Molinos
- 2014–2015: Lleida Esportiu

Senior career*
Years	Team	Apps	(Gls)
2013	FC Andorra	3	(0)
2014–2015	Lleida Esportiu B	20	(2)
2015–2018	FC Andorra	25	(2)
2019	UE Santa Coloma	15	(9)
2019–2021	Engordany	33	(10)
2021–2022	Atlètic d'Escaldes	24	(3)
2022–2023	UE Santa Coloma	9	(1)
2024	Ordino	8	(0)
2024	Penya Encarnada	10	(2)
2025–	La Massana	8	(0)

International career^{‡}
2011–2012	Andorra U17	6	(2)
2012–2014	Andorra U19	9	(1)
2014–2017	Andorra U21	11	(1)
2015–	Andorra	38	(0)
- * Club domestic league appearances and goals as of 18 May 2025 ‡ National team caps and goals as of 19 November 2024

Aarón Sánchez Alburquerque (born 5 June 1996) is an Andorran footballer who plays as a forward for La Massana.
