= Tarakanov, Alexeyevsky District =

Tarakanov Тараканов
- Khutor
- Location within Belgorod Oblast Location within Russia
- Coordinates: 50°33′N 38°46′E
- Country: Russia
- Region: Belgorod Oblast
- District: Alexeyevsky District
- Time zone: UTC+3:00

Tarakanov (Russian: Тараканов) is a rural locality (a khutor) in Alexeyevsky District, Belgorod Oblast, Russia. The population was 33 as of 2010. There is 1 street.

== Geography ==
Tarakanov is located 18 km southeast of Alexeyevka (the district's administrative centre) by road. Shaposhnikov is the nearest rural locality.
