= Tarakanovka =

Tarakanovka Таракановка
- Selo
- Location within Republic of Buryatia Location within Russia
- Coordinates: 52°04′N 106°57′E
- Country: Russia
- Region: Republic of Buryatia
- District: Kabansky District
- Time zone: UTC+8:00

Tarakanovka (Russian: Таракановка) is a rural locality (a selo) in Kabansky District, Republic of Buryatia, Russia. The population was 157 as of 2010. There are 2 streets.

== Geography ==
Tarakanovka is located 25 km east of Kabansk (the district's administrative centre) by road. Treskovo is the nearest rural locality.
