= Pavel Bogush =

Belarusian professional footballer

Personal information
- Date of birth: 24 January 1996 (age 30)
- Place of birth: Minsk, Belarus
- Height: 1.78 m (5 ft 10 in)
- Position: Midfielder

Youth career
- 2011–2015: BATE Borisov

Senior career*
Years	Team	Apps	(Gls)
2015–2016	BATE Borisov	0	(0)
2016	→ Smolevichi-STI (loan)	9	(1)
2016	→ Luch Minsk (loan)	10	(1)
2017	Luch Minsk	0	(0)
2017	Krumkachy Minsk	2	(0)
2018	Granit Mikashevichi	11	(0)
2018–2019	Underdog Chist	18	(10)
2020	Molodechno	0	(0)
2021	Uzda	1	(0)

International career
2012	Belarus U17	3	(1)
- * Club domestic league appearances and goals as of 31 December 2021

Pavel Bogush (Belarusian: Павел Богуш; Russian: Павел Богуш; born 24 January 1996) is a Belarusian professional footballer.
