= Aleksey Tarakanov =

Belarusian footballer

Personal information
- Date of birth: 26 March 1996 (age 30)
- Place of birth: Starye Dorogi, Minsk Oblast, Belarus
- Height: 1.70 m (5 ft 7 in)
- Position: Midfielder

Team information
- Current team: Traktor Minsk

Youth career
- 2009–2015: Minsk

Senior career*
Years	Team	Apps	(Gls)
2015–2016	Minsk	0	(0)
2016	→ Smorgon (loan)	21	(3)
2017–2018	Isloch Minsk Raion	13	(0)
2018	→ Belshina Bobruisk (loan)	22	(2)
2019	Smorgon	8	(0)
2022–2023	Traktor Minsk	24	(7)

International career^{‡}
2012–2013	Belarus U17		
2014	Belarus U19		
2016–2017	Belarus U21	3	(0)
- * Club domestic league appearances and goals as of 31 December 2023 ‡ National team caps and goals as of 14 November 2017

Aleksey Tarakanov (Belarusian: Аляксей Тараканаў; Russian: Алексей Тараканов; born 26 March 1996) is a Belarusian professional footballer who plays for Traktor Minsk.
