= 2013 UEFA European Under-17 Championship squads =

The 2013 UEFA European Under-17 Football Championship was an international under-17 age group football tournament held in Slovakia from 5 May until 17 May 2013. The eight national teams involved in the tournament are required to register a squad of 18 players; only players in these squads are eligible to take part in the tournament.

Before the start of the tournament, the UEFA administration provides all participating teams with an official form which must be completed with the 18 players participating in the tournament. Two of these 18 players must be goalkeepers. The form must be accompanied by the 18 selected players' passports to prove they are eligible for the tournament.

Any injured or sick goalkeepers and a maximum of two injured or sick players may be replaced upon submission of written medical evidence and approved by the UEFA doctor on duty at the tournament. Replaced players can take no further part in the tournament.

The 18 players must wear set numbers between 1 and 23. No number may be used by more than one player in the course of the tournament. For all matches played in the tournament, players must wear the number indicated on the official list of 18 players.

Players in boldface have been capped at full international level at some point in their career.

== Group A ==
=== Austria ===
Head coach: (Austria) Hermann Stadler

No.	Pos.	Player	Date of birth (age)	Club
1	GK	Marcel Hartl	22 July 1996 (aged 16)	(Austrian Football Association) Ried
2	FW	Daniel Ripic	14 March 1996 (aged 17)	(Austrian Football Association) Red Bull Salzburg
3	DF	Stefan Perić	13 February 1997 (aged 16)	(Austrian Football Association) Red Bull Salzburg
4	MF	Lukas Tursch	29 March 1996 (aged 17)	(Austrian Football Association) FAL Linz
5	DF	Michael Lercher	4 January 1996 (aged 17)	(German Football Association) Werder Bremen
6	MF	Raphael Mathis	25 January 1996 (aged 17)	(Austrian Football Association) Lustenau 07
7	FW	**Adrian Grbić**	4 August 1996 (aged 16)	(German Football Association) VfB Stuttgart
8	MF	Sascha Horvath	22 August 1996 (aged 16)	(Austrian Football Association) Austria Wien
9	FW	Tobias Pellegrini	3 April 1996 (aged 17)	(Austrian Football Association) FAL Linz
10	MF	**Valentino Lazaro**	24 March 1996 (aged 17)	(Austrian Football Association) Red Bull Salzburg
11	DF	Petar Gluhakovic	25 March 1996 (aged 17)	(Austrian Football Association) Austria Wien
12	MF	Thomas Steiner	6 February 1996 (aged 17)	(Austrian Football Association) Rapid Wien
13	FW	Luca Mayr-Fälten	6 April 1996 (aged 17)	(Austrian Football Association) Ried
14	DF	Marcel Probst	21 July 1996 (aged 16)	(Austrian Football Association) Red Bull Salzburg
15	DF	Manuel Haas	7 May 1996 (aged 16)	(Austrian Football Association) Red Bull Salzburg
17	FW	Nikola Zivotic	26 January 1996 (aged 17)	(Austrian Football Association) Austria Wien
19	DF	Dominik Baumgartner	20 July 1996 (aged 16)	(Austrian Football Association) St. Pölten
21	GK	**Alexander Schlager**	1 February 1996 (aged 17)	(Austrian Football Association) Red Bull Salzburg

=== Slovakia ===
Head coach: (Slovakia) Ladislav Pecko

No.	Pos.	Player	Date of birth (age)	Club
1	GK	Martin Junas	9 March 1996 (aged 17)	(Slovak Football Association) Senica
2	DF	Andrej Kadlec	2 February 1996 (aged 17)	(Slovak Football Association) Žilina
3	DF	**Denis Vavro**	10 April 1996 (aged 17)	(Slovak Football Association) Žilina
4	DF	Martin Slaninka	26 March 1996 (aged 17)	(Slovak Football Association) Žilina
5	DF	Michal Vodecký	22 August 1996 (aged 16)	(Slovak Football Association) Banská Bystrica
6	FW	Martin Vlček	5 February 1996 (aged 17)	(Slovak Football Association) Trenčín
7	MF	**Miroslav Káčer**	2 February 1996 (aged 17)	(Slovak Football Association) Žilina
8	MF	Jakub Grič	5 July 1996 (aged 16)	(Slovak Football Association) Michalovce
9	FW	Tomáš Vestenický	6 April 1996 (aged 17)	(Slovak Football Association) Nitra
10	FW	Nikolas Špalek	12 February 1997 (aged 16)	(Slovak Football Association) Nitra
11	MF	Filip Lesniak	14 May 1996 (aged 16)	(The Football Association) Tottenham Hotspur
12	GK	Juraj Semanko	2 January 1996 (aged 17)	(Football Association of the Czech Republic) 1. FC Slovácko
13	FW	Lukáš Čmelík	13 April 1996 (aged 17)	(Slovak Football Association) Žilina
14	DF	Erik Otrísal	28 June 1996 (aged 16)	(Slovak Football Association) Senica
15	DF	Šimon Kupec	11 February 1996 (aged 17)	(Slovak Football Association) Banská Bystrica
16	MF	Tomáš Zázrivec	16 June 1996 (aged 16)	(The Football Association) Aston Villa
17	MF	**Lukáš Haraslín**	26 May 1996 (aged 16)	(Slovak Football Association) Slovan Bratislava
18	DF	Atila Varga	11 April 1996 (aged 17)	(Italian Football Federation) Juventus

=== Sweden ===
Head coach: Roland Larsson

No.	Pos.	Player	Date of birth (age)	Caps	Goals	Club
1	GK	**Sixten Mohlin**	17 January 1996 (aged 17)	7	0	(Swedish Football Association) Malmö FF
2	DF	Jakob Bergman	2 January 1996 (aged 17)	16	1	(Swedish Football Association) IK Sirius
3	DF	Ali Suljić	18 September 1997 (aged 15)	8	0	(Swedish Football Association) Motala AIF
4	DF	Sebastian Ramhorn	3 May 1996 (aged 17)	15	0	(Swedish Football Association) Kalmar FF
5	DF	Johan Ramhorn	3 May 1996 (aged 17)	14	0	(Swedish Football Association) Kalmar FF
6	DF	**Noah Sonko Sundberg**	6 June 1996 (aged 16)	12	2	(Swedish Football Association) AIK
7	DF	**Linus Wahlqvist**	11 November 1996 (aged 16)	17	1	(Swedish Football Association) IFK Norrköping
8	MF	Elias Andersson (c)	31 January 1996 (aged 17)	18	4	(Swedish Football Association) Helsingborgs IF
9	FW	Valmir Berisha	6 June 1996 (aged 16)	7	6	(Swedish Football Association) Halmstads BK
10	MF	**Erdal Rakip**	13 February 1996 (aged 17)	5	0	(Swedish Football Association) Malmö FF
11	MF	**Anton Salétros**	12 April 1996 (aged 17)	17	2	(Swedish Football Association) AIK
12	GK	Hampus Strömgren	8 July 1996 (aged 16)	9	0	(Swedish Football Association) Mjällby AIF
13	MF	Viktor Nordin	18 January 1996 (aged 17)	12	1	(Swedish Football Association) Hammarby IF
14	MF	Isak Ssewankambo	27 February 1996 (aged 17)	14	2	(The Football Association) Chelsea
15	MF	Gentrit Citaku	25 February 1996 (aged 17)	15	5	(Swedish Football Association) IFK Norrköping
16	FW	**Gustav Engvall**	29 April 1996 (aged 17)	16	5	(Swedish Football Association) IFK Göteborg
17	MF	Mirza Halvadžić	15 February 1996 (aged 17)	20	3	(Swedish Football Association) Malmö FF
18	FW	Christer Lipovac	7 March 1996 (aged 17)	15	6	(Swedish Football Association) Karlslunds IF

=== Switzerland ===
Head coach: (Switzerland) Heinz Moser

No.	Pos.	Player	Date of birth (age)	Club
1	GK	Fabian Fellmann	23 July 1996 (aged 16)	(Swiss Football Association) Zürich
2	DF	Nicolas Stettler	28 April 1996 (aged 17)	(Swiss Football Association) Zürich
3	DF	Olivier Kleiner	3 February 1996 (aged 17)	(Swiss Football Association) Luzern
4	DF	Marko Drakul	6 August 1996 (aged 16)	(Swiss Football Association) Basel
5	DF	**Nico Elvedi**	30 September 1996 (aged 16)	(Swiss Football Association) Zürich
6	DF	Deni Kadoic	3 April 1996 (aged 17)	(Swiss Football Association) Basel
7	FW	Jolan Forestal	6 March 1996 (aged 17)	(Swiss Football Association) Sion
8	MF	Eric Briner	1 February 1996 (aged 17)	(Swiss Football Association) Young Boys
9	FW	Nicolas Hunziker	23 February 1996 (aged 17)	(Swiss Football Association) Basel
10	MF	Anto Grgić	28 November 1996 (aged 16)	(Swiss Football Association) Zürich
11	FW	Marco Trachsel	2 August 1996 (aged 16)	(Swiss Football Association) Grasshopper
12	GK	Mateo Matic	7 January 1996 (aged 17)	(Swiss Football Association) Grasshopper
13	MF	Phi Nguyen	3 July 1996 (aged 16)	(Swiss Football Association) Luzern
14	MF	Robin Kamber	15 February 1996 (aged 17)	(Swiss Football Association) Basel
15	MF	Marsel Stevic	22 February 1996 (aged 17)	(Swiss Football Association) St. Gallen
16	DF	Nils Von Niederhäusern	10 January 1996 (aged 17)	(Swiss Football Association) Zürich
17	FW	Joao Pedro Abreu	6 January 1996 (aged 17)	(Swiss Football Association) Basel
18	FW	Kilian Pagliuca	2 September 1996 (aged 16)	(French Football Federation) Lyon

== Group B ==
=== Croatia ===
Head coach: (Croatia) Ivan Gudelj

No.	Pos.	Player	Date of birth (age)	Club
1	GK	Marko Marić	3 January 1996 (aged 17)	(Austrian Football Association) Rapid Wien
2	DF	Marko Stolnik	8 July 1996 (aged 16)	(Croatian Football Federation) Dinamo Zagreb
3	DF	Petar Mamić	6 March 1996 (aged 17)	(Croatian Football Federation) Dinamo Zagreb
4	MF	**Ivan Šunjić**	9 October 1996 (aged 16)	(Croatian Football Federation) Dinamo Zagreb
5	DF	**Duje Ćaleta-Car**	17 September 1996 (aged 16)	(Croatian Football Federation) HNK Šibenik
6	DF	Franjo Prce	7 January 1996 (aged 17)	(Croatian Football Federation) Hajduk Split
7	MF	Josip Bašić	2 March 1996 (aged 17)	(Croatian Football Federation) Hajduk Split
8	MF	Ante Roguljić	11 March 1996 (aged 17)	(Croatian Football Federation) Adriatic Split
9	FW	Fran Brodić	8 January 1997 (aged 16)	(Croatian Football Federation) Dinamo Zagreb
10	MF	**Alen Halilović**	18 June 1996 (aged 16)	(Croatian Football Federation) Dinamo Zagreb
11	MF	Frane Vojković	20 December 1996 (aged 16)	(Croatian Football Federation) Hajduk Split
12	GK	**Ivo Grbić**	18 January 1996 (aged 17)	(Croatian Football Federation) Hajduk Split
13	DF	Hrvoje Džijan	26 June 1996 (aged 16)	(Croatian Football Federation) Dinamo Zagreb
14	DF	Anton Krešić	29 January 1996 (aged 17)	(Croatian Football Federation) NK Zagreb
15	DF	Lukas Čuljak	5 March 1996 (aged 17)	(German Football Association) Bayern Munich
16	MF	Ivan Fiolić	29 April 1996 (aged 17)	(Croatian Football Federation) Dinamo Zagreb
17	MF	Karlo Lulić	10 May 1996 (aged 16)	(Croatian Football Federation) NK Osijek
18	FW	Robert Murić	12 March 1996 (aged 17)	(Croatian Football Federation) Dinamo Zagreb

=== Italy ===
Head coach: (Italy) Daniele Zoratto

No.	Pos.	Player	Date of birth (age)	Club
1	GK	Simone Scuffet	31 May 1996 (aged 16)	(Italian Football Federation) Udinese
2	DF	**Davide Calabria**	6 December 1996 (aged 16)	(Italian Football Federation) Milan
3	DF	**Federico Dimarco**	10 November 1997 (aged 15)	(Italian Football Federation) Internazionale
4	MF	Mario Pugliese	26 March 1996 (aged 17)	(Italian Football Federation) Atalanta
5	DF	Elio Capradossi	11 March 1996 (aged 17)	(Italian Football Federation) Roma
6	DF	Giacomo Sciacca	19 April 1996 (aged 17)	(Italian Football Federation) Internazionale
7	FW	Gennaro Tutino	20 August 1996 (aged 16)	(Italian Football Federation) Napoli
8	MF	Andrea Palazzi	24 February 1996 (aged 17)	(Italian Football Federation) Internazionale
9	FW	Alberto Cerri	16 April 1996 (aged 17)	(Italian Football Federation) Parma
10	MF	Vittorio Parigini	25 March 1996 (aged 17)	(Italian Football Federation) Torino
11	FW	Federico Bonazzoli	21 May 1997 (aged 15)	(Italian Football Federation) Internazionale
12	GK	**Emil Audero**	18 January 1997 (aged 16)	(Italian Football Federation) Juventus
13	DF	Matteo Lomolino	11 March 1996 (aged 17)	(Italian Football Federation) Internazionale
14	MF	Alberto Tibolla	31 January 1996 (aged 17)	(Italian Football Federation) Chievo
15	MF	Demetrio Steffè	30 July 1996 (aged 16)	(Italian Football Federation) Internazionale
16	DF	Arturo Calabresi	17 March 1996 (aged 17)	(Italian Football Federation) Roma
18	FW	Luca Vido	3 February 1997 (aged 16)	(Italian Football Federation) Milan
19	FW	Davide Di Molfetta	23 June 1996 (aged 16)	(Italian Football Federation) Milan

=== Russia ===
Head coach: (Russia) Dmitri Khomukha

No.	Pos.	Player	Date of birth (age)	Club
1	GK	Anton Mitryushkin	8 February 1996 (aged 17)	(Russian Football Union) Spartak Moscow
2	MF	Vladislav Parshikov	19 February 1996 (aged 17)	(Russian Football Union) Akademia Chertanovo
3	DF	Aleksandr Likhachyov	22 July 1996 (aged 16)	(Russian Football Union) Spartak Moscow
4	DF	Dzhamaldin Khodzhaniyazov	18 July 1996 (aged 16)	(Russian Football Union) Zenit St. Petersburg
5	DF	Denis Yakuba	26 May 1996 (aged 16)	(Russian Football Union) Akademia Chertanovo
6	DF	Sergei Makarov	3 October 1996 (aged 16)	(Russian Football Union) Lokomotiv Moscow
7	FW	Aleksandr Makarov	24 April 1996 (aged 17)	(Russian Football Union) CSKA Moscow
8	MF	Danila Buranov	11 February 1996 (aged 17)	(Russian Football Union) Spartak Moscow
9	FW	Aleksei Gasilin	1 March 1996 (aged 17)	(Russian Football Union) Zenit St. Petersburg
10	MF	**Aleksandr Golovin**	30 May 1996 (aged 16)	(Russian Football Union) CSKA Moscow
11	FW	Aleksandr Zuyev	26 June 1996 (aged 16)	(Russian Football Union) Akademia Chertanovo
12	GK	Aleksei Kuznetsov	20 August 1996 (aged 16)	(Russian Football Union) Akademia Chertanovo
13	MF	Yegor Rudkovskiy	4 March 1996 (aged 17)	(Russian Football Union) Akademia Chertanovo
14	DF	Anatolie Nikolaesh	17 April 1996 (aged 17)	(Russian Football Union) CSKA Moscow
15	MF	**Dmitri Barinov**	11 September 1996 (aged 16)	(Russian Football Union) Lokomotiv Moscow
16	MF	Aleksandr Dovbnya	14 February 1996 (aged 17)	(Russian Football Union) Lokomotiv Moscow
18	MF	**Rifat Zhemaletdinov**	20 September 1996 (aged 16)	(Russian Football Union) Lokomotiv Moscow
19	MF	**Ramil Sheydayev**	15 March 1996 (aged 17)	(Russian Football Union) Zenit St. Petersburg

=== Ukraine ===
Head coach: (Ukraine) Oleksandr Holovko

No.	Pos.	Player	Date of birth (age)	Club
1	GK	Vadym Soldatenko	28 May 1996 (aged 16)	(Ukrainian Association of Football) Dynamo Kyiv
3	MF	Valeriy Luchkevych	11 January 1996 (aged 17)	(Ukrainian Association of Football) Metalurh Zaporizhya
4	MF	Bohdan Kuksenko	11 February 1996 (aged 17)	(Ukrainian Association of Football) Metalist Kharkiv
5	MF	Pavlo Makohon	25 September 1996 (aged 16)	(Ukrainian Association of Football) Karpaty Lviv
6	DF	Ihor Kyryukhantsev	29 January 1996 (aged 17)	(Ukrainian Association of Football) Shakhtar Donetsk
7	FW	Nutsu Ardelyan	18 June 1996 (aged 16)	(Ukrainian Association of Football) RVUFK Kyiv
8	MF	Pavlo Orikhovskyi	13 May 1996 (aged 16)	(Ukrainian Association of Football) Dynamo Kyiv
9	FW	**Andriy Boryachuk**	23 April 1996 (aged 17)	(Ukrainian Association of Football) Shakhtar Donetsk
10	MF	Beka Vachiberadze	5 March 1996 (aged 17)	(Ukrainian Association of Football) Shakhtar Donetsk
11	MF	**Viktor Tsyhankov**	15 November 1997 (aged 15)	(Ukrainian Association of Football) Dynamo Kyiv
12	GK	Dmytro Bezruk	30 March 1996 (aged 17)	(Ukrainian Association of Football) Chornomorets Odesa
13	DF	Oleksandr Osman	18 April 1996 (aged 17)	(Ukrainian Association of Football) Metalist Kharkiv
14	DF	Stanislav Shtanenko	5 February 1996 (aged 17)	(Ukrainian Association of Football) UFC Lviv
15	MF	Danylo Knysh	3 March 1996 (aged 17)	(Ukrainian Association of Football) Dynamo Kyiv
16	DF	Pavlo Lukyanchuk	19 May 1996 (aged 16)	(Ukrainian Association of Football) Dynamo Kyiv
17	DF	**Oleksandr Zinchenko**	15 December 1996 (aged 16)	(Ukrainian Association of Football) Shakhtar Donetsk
19	DF	Ihor Yarovoy	8 April 1996 (aged 17)	(Ukrainian Association of Football) Dynamo Kyiv
20	MF	Maksym Tretyakov	6 March 1996 (aged 17)	(Ukrainian Association of Football) Dnipro Dnipropetrovsk
