= 2013 UEFA European Under-17 Championship =

Majstrovstvá európy vo futbale hráčov do 17 rokov 2013

Tournament details
- Host country: Slovakia
- Dates: 5–17 May
- Teams: 8 (from 1 confederation)
- Venue: 4 (in 4 host cities)

Final positions
- Champions: Russia (3rd title)
- Runners-up: Italy

Tournament statistics
- Matches played: 15
- Goals scored: 24 (1.6 per match)
- Attendance: 44,757 (2,984 per match)
- Top scorer(s): (Slovakia) Martin Slaninka (Switzerland) Robin Kamber (2 goals)
- Best player: (Russia) Anton Mitryushkin

The 2013 UEFA European Under-17 Championship was the twelfth edition of UEFA's European Under-17 Football Championship since the re-organising of age group competitions in 2002. Slovakia were hosts of the tournament with games taking place at four venues between 5–17 May.

This competition also acted as a qualifier for the 2013 FIFA U-17 World Cup, as 6 teams qualified.

Players born after 1 January 1996 were eligible to participate in this competition. The Netherlands were the titleholder, but failed to make it past the elite round qualification process, along with every team that played in the 2012 final round.

== Venues ==
Venues map
- Štadión pod Dubňom, Žilina (capacity 10,831)
- Mestský Štadión, Dubnica nad Váhom (5,156)
- Štadión pod Zoborom, Nitra (5,050)
- Štadión FC ViOn, Zlaté Moravce (3,300)

== Qualification ==
The final tournament of the 2013 UEFA European Under-17 Championship was preceded by two qualification stages: a qualifying round and an Elite round. During the rounds, 52 national teams competed to determine the seven teams that would progress to the finals.

The first round was played from 24 September to 14 November 2012, with 28 of those advancing to the elite round. The elite rounds were played during March 2013.

=== Qualified countries ===
Country	Qualified as	Previous appearances in tournament^{1} only U-17 era (since 2002)
Slovakia	Hosts	0 (debut)
Croatia	Winner of Group 1	1 (2005)
Austria	Winner of Group 2	2 (2003, 2004)
Sweden	Winner of Group 3	0 (debut)
Ukraine	Winner of Group 4	3 (2002, 2004, 2007)
Switzerland	Winner of Group 5	5 (**2002**, 2005, 2008, 2009, 2010)
Russia	Winner of Group 6	1 (**2006**)
Italy	Winner of Group 7	3 (2003, 2005, 2009)

^{1} Bold indicates champion for that year. Italic indicates host for that year.

== Match officials ==
Referees

- Neil Doyle (Republic of Ireland)
- Nerijus Dunauskas (Lithuania)
- Serdar Gözübüyük (Netherlands)
- Anastasios Sidiropoulos (Greece)
- Ivaylo Stoyanov (Bulgaria)
- Slavko Vinčić (Slovenia)

Assistant referees

- Gregory Crotteux (Belgium)
- Silver Kõiv (Estonia)
- (North Macedonia) Dejan Kostadinov (Macedonia)
- Milan Minić (Serbia)
- Birkir Sigurdarson (Iceland)
- Richard Storey (Northern Ireland)
- Dmitri Zhuk (Belarus)
- Sergei Vassyutin (Kazakhstan)

Fourth officials

- Petr Kráľovič (Slovakia)
- Vladimír Vnuk (Slovakia)

== Group stage ==
Key to colours in group tables
Advance to semifinals and qualify to 2013 FIFA U-17 World Cup
Qualify to 2013 FIFA U-17 World Cup

=== Group A ===
Pos	Team	Pld	W	D	L	GF	GA	GD	Pts	Qualification
1	Slovakia (H)	3	1	2	0	3	2	+1	5	Knockout stage and 2013 FIFA U-17 World Cup
2	Sweden	3	1	2	0	2	1	+1	5	Knockout stage and 2013 FIFA U-17 World Cup
3	Austria	3	1	1	1	3	3	0	4	2013 FIFA U-17 World Cup
4	Switzerland	3	0	1	2	3	5	−2	1	

(H) Hosts
5 May 2013
14:30 CEST

Slovakia	1–0	Austria
Slaninka 80+2'	Report

Mestský Štadión, Dubnica nad Váhom
Attendance: 4,116
Referee: Serdar Gözübüyük (Netherlands)
5 May 2013
19:30 CEST

Switzerland	0–1	Sweden
	Report	Engvall 38'

Štadión pod Dubňom, Žilina
Attendance: 1,938
Referee: Anastasios Sidiropoulos (Greece)

8 May 2013
16:00 CEST

Austria	1–1	Sweden
Zivotic 49'	Report	Suljić 44'

Mestský Štadión, Dubnica nad Váhom
Attendance: 740
Referee: Neil Doyle (Republic of Ireland)
8 May 2013
18:00 CEST

Slovakia	2–2	Switzerland
Varga 39'; Slaninka 69'	Report	Trachsel 22'; Kamber 29'

Štadión pod Dubňom, Žilina
Attendance: 8,327
Referee: Ivaylo Stoyanov (Bulgaria)

11 May 2013
16:30 CEST

Sweden	0–0	Slovakia
	Report

Štadión pod Dubňom, Žilina
Attendance: 7,643
Referee: Slavko Vinčić (Slovenia)
11 May 2013
16:30 CEST

Austria	2–1	Switzerland
Baumgartner 11'; Ripic 35'	Report	Kamber 57'

Mestský Štadión, Dubnica nad Váhom
Attendance: 750
Referee: Nerijus Dunauskas (Lithuania)

=== Group B ===
Pos	Team	Pld	W	D	L	GF	GA	GD	Pts	Qualification
1	Russia	3	1	2	0	4	1	+3	5	Knockout stage and 2013 FIFA U-17 World Cup
2	Italy	3	1	2	0	3	2	+1	5	Knockout stage and 2013 FIFA U-17 World Cup
3	Croatia	3	1	2	0	2	1	+1	5	2013 FIFA U-17 World Cup
4	Ukraine	3	0	0	3	2	7	−5	0	

5 May 2013
14:30 CEST

Russia	3–0	Ukraine
Khodzhaniyazov 47'; Mayrovich 62'; Zhemaletdinov 79'	Report

Štadión FC ViOn, Zlaté Moravce
Attendance: 640
Referee: Ivaylo Stoyanov (Bulgaria)
5 May 2013
17:30 CEST

Croatia	0–0	Italy
	Report

Štadión pod Zoborom, Nitra
Attendance: 2,367
Referee: Neil Doyle (Republic of Ireland)

8 May 2013
14:00 CEST

Russia	0–0	Croatia
	Report

Štadión FC ViOn, Zlaté Moravce
Attendance: 1,860
Referee: Nerijus Dunauskas (Lithuania)
8 May 2013
18:00 CEST

Ukraine	1–2	Italy
Vachiberadze 61'	Report	Parigini 75'; Pugliese 80+3'

Štadión pod Zoborom, Nitra
Attendance: 2,110
Referee: Slavko Vinčić (Slovenia)

11 May 2013
19:30 CEST

Ukraine	1–2	Croatia
Tsygankov 17'	Report	Halilović 40' (pen.); Murić 72'

Štadión FC ViOn, Zlaté Moravce
Attendance: 1,340
Referee: Anastasios Sidiropoulos (Greece)
11 May 2013
19:30 CEST

Italy	1–1	Russia
Capradossi 43'	Report	Gasilin 12'

Štadión pod Zoborom, Nitra
Attendance: 1,560
Referee: Serdar Gözübüyük (Netherlands)

== Knockout stage ==
=== Bracket ===
Semi-finals
14 May – Žilina
Slovakia	0
Italy	2
14 May – Žilina
Russia	0 (10)
Sweden	0 (9)

Final
17 May – Žilina
Italy	0 (4)
Russia	0 (5)

=== Semi-finals ===
14 May 2013
16:00

Slovakia	0–2	Italy
	Report	Pugliese 3'; Capradossi 64'

Štadión pod Dubňom, Žilina
Attendance: 6,985
Referee: Nerijus Dunauskas (Lithuania)

14 May 2013
20:30

Russia	0–0	Sweden
	Report
Penalties
Rudkovskiy (penalty missed); Zhemaletdinov (penalty scored); Khodzhaniyazov (penalty scored); Sheydayev (penalty scored); Gasilin (penalty scored); Parshikov (penalty scored); S. Makarov (penalty scored); Likhachev (penalty scored); Barinov (penalty scored); Mitryushkin (penalty scored); Sheydaev (penalty scored)	10–9	(penalty scored) Ssewankambo; (penalty scored) Wahlqvist; (penalty scored) Lipovac; (penalty scored) Berisha; (penalty missed) Halvadzić; (penalty scored) Bergman; (penalty scored) Sonko Sundberg; (penalty scored) Suljić; (penalty scored) S. Ramhorn; (penalty scored) Mohlin; (penalty missed) Ssewankambo

Štadión pod Dubňom, Žilina
Attendance: 969
Referee: Slavko Vinčić (Slovenia)

=== Final ===
17 May 2013
18:00

Italy	0–0	Russia
	Report
Penalties
Di Molfetta (penalty missed); Cerri (penalty scored); Sciacca (penalty missed); Capradossi (penalty scored); Dimarco (penalty scored); Parigini (penalty scored); Palazzi (penalty missed)	4–5	Sheydayev (penalty scored); Khodzhaniyazov (penalty scored); Parshikov (penalty missed); Buranov (penalty scored); Gasilin (penalty missed); A. Makarov (penalty scored); S. Makarov (penalty scored)

Štadión pod Dubňom, Žilina
Attendance: 3,412
Referee: Anastasios Sidiropoulos (Greece)

== Goalscorers ==
2 goals

- (Italy) Elio Capradossi
- (Italy) Mario Pugliese
- (Slovakia) Martin Slaninka
- (Switzerland) Robin Kamber

1 goal

- (Austria) Dominik Baumgartner
- (Austria) Daniel Ripic
- (Austria) Nikola Zivotic
- (Croatia) Alen Halilović
- (Croatia) Robert Murić
- (Italy) Vittorio Parigini
- (Russia) Aleksei Gasilin
- (Russia) Dzhamaldin Khodzhaniyazov
- (Russia) Maksim Mayrovich
- (Russia) Rifat Zhemaletdinov
- (Slovakia) Atila Varga
- (Sweden) Gustav Engvall
- (Sweden) Ali Suljić
- (Switzerland) Marco Trachsel
- (Ukraine) Viktor Tsygankov
- (Ukraine) Beka Vachiberadze

== Broadcasting ==
Live coverage and highlights of the finals were broadcast by Eurosport throughout Europe.
