= 2015 UEFA European Under-19 Championship squads =

Player listings in youth football competition

The 2015 UEFA European Under-19 Championship was an international football tournament held in Greece from 6 to 19 July 2015.

Each national team submitted a squad of 18 players, two of whom had to be goalkeepers.

Players in boldface have since been capped at full international level.

Ages are as of the start of the tournament, 6 July 2015.

== Group A ==
=== Greece ===
On 19 June 2015, Greece announced 23-man preliminary list. On 6 July 2015, Greece named their final squad.

Head coach: Giannis Goumas

No.	Pos.	Player	Date of birth (age)	Caps	Goals	Club
1	GK	Konstantinos Kotsaris	25 July 1996 (aged 18)			(Hellenic Football Federation) Panathinaikos
2	DF	**Manolis Saliakas**	12 September 1996 (aged 18)			(Hellenic Football Federation) Olympiacos
3	DF	**Kostas Tsimikas**	12 May 1996 (aged 19)			(Hellenic Football Federation) Olympiacos
4	MF	Albert Roussos	22 February 1996 (aged 19)			(Italian Football Federation) Juventus
5	DF	Timotheos Tselepidis	2 February 1996 (aged 19)			(Hellenic Football Federation) PAOK
6	MF	Zisis Karahalios	10 January 1996 (aged 19)			(Hellenic Football Federation) Olympiacos
8	MF	Paschalis Staikos	8 February 1996 (aged 19)			(Hellenic Football Federation) Panathinaikos
9	FW	**Efthimis Koulouris**	6 March 1996 (aged 19)			(Hellenic Football Federation) PAOK
10	MF	Petros Orphanides	23 March 1996 (aged 19)			(Hellenic Football Federation) Skoda Xanthi
11	FW	Panagiotis Kynigopoulos	24 September 1996 (aged 18)			(Hellenic Football Federation) Aiginiakos
13	GK	Christos Theodorakis	17 September 1996 (aged 18)			(Hellenic Football Federation) Atromitos
14	DF	Alkis Markopouliotis	13 August 1996 (aged 18)			(Hellenic Football Federation) AEK Athens
15	MF	Nikolaos Vasaitis	14 April 1996 (aged 19)			(Hellenic Football Federation) PAOK
16	DF	**Giorgos Kyriakopoulos**	5 February 1996 (aged 19)			(Hellenic Football Federation) Asteras Tripolis
17	FW	Dimitris Mavrias	23 October 1996 (aged 18)			(Hellenic Football Federation) Anagennisi Karditsa
19	FW	Nikos Vergos	13 January 1996 (aged 19)			(Hellenic Football Federation) Olympiacos
20	MF	Stelios Pozoglou	22 January 1996 (aged 19)			(Hellenic Football Federation) PAOK
23	MF	Vasilios Miliotis	29 February 1996 (aged 19)			(Hellenic Football Federation) Ermionida

=== Ukraine ===
On 21 June 2015, Ukraine announced 23-man preliminary list. On 4 July 2015, Ukraine named their final squad.

Head coach: Oleksandr Holovko

No.	Pos.	Player	Date of birth (age)	Caps	Goals	Club
1	GK	Vadym Soldatenko	28 May 1996 (aged 19)			(Ukrainian Association of Football) Dynamo Kyiv
2	DF	Oleksandr Osman	18 April 1996 (aged 19)			(Ukrainian Association of Football) Dynamo Kyiv
4	DF	**Mykola Matviyenko**	2 May 1996 (aged 19)			(Ukrainian Association of Football) Shakhtar Donetsk
6	DF	Ihor Kyryukhantsev	29 January 1996 (aged 19)			(Ukrainian Association of Football) Shakhtar Donetsk
7	MF	Denys Arendaruk	16 April 1996 (aged 19)			(Ukrainian Association of Football) Shakhtar Donetsk
8	MF	Beka Vachiberadze	5 March 1996 (aged 19)			(Ukrainian Association of Football) Shakhtar Donetsk
9	FW	**Andriy Boryachuk**	23 April 1996 (aged 19)			(Ukrainian Association of Football) Shakhtar Donetsk
10	MF	**Viktor Kovalenko**	14 February 1996 (aged 19)			(Ukrainian Association of Football) Shakhtar Donetsk
11	FW	**Artem Besyedin**	31 March 1996 (aged 19)			(Ukrainian Association of Football) Metalurh Donetsk
12	GK	Oleh Mozil	7 April 1996 (aged 19)			(Ukrainian Association of Football) Karpaty Lviv
13	DF	Ivan Zotko	9 July 1996 (aged 18)			(Ukrainian Association of Football) Metalist Kharkiv
14	MF	Valeriy Luchkevych	11 January 1996 (aged 19)			(Ukrainian Association of Football) Dnipro Dnipropetrovsk
16	DF	Pavlo Lukyanchuk	19 May 1996 (aged 19)			(Ukrainian Association of Football) Dynamo Kyiv
17	MF	**Oleksandr Zinchenko**	15 December 1996 (aged 18)			(Russian Football Union) Ufa
18	MF	Dmytro Klyots	15 April 1996 (aged 19)			(Ukrainian Association of Football) Karpaty Lviv
20	MF	**Viktor Tsyhankov**	15 November 1997 (aged 17)			(Ukrainian Association of Football) Dynamo Kyiv
21	DF	**Bohdan Mykhaylichenko**	21 March 1997 (aged 18)			(Ukrainian Association of Football) Dynamo Kyiv
22	MF	**Oleksandr Zubkov**	3 August 1996 (aged 18)			(Ukrainian Association of Football) Shakhtar Donetsk

=== Austria ===
On 18 June 2015, Austria named their squad.

Head coach: Hermann Stadler

No.	Pos.	Player	Date of birth (age)	Caps	Goals	Club
1	GK	Osman Hadžikić	12 March 1996 (aged 19)			(Austrian Football Association) Austria Wien
3	DF	Stefan Perić	13 February 1997 (aged 18)			(German Football Association) VfB Stuttgart
4	DF	Maximilian Ullmann	17 June 1996 (aged 19)			(Austrian Football Association) LASK Linz
5	DF	David Gugganig	10 February 1997 (aged 18)			(Austrian Football Association) FC Liefering
6	MF	Lukas Tursch	29 March 1996 (aged 19)			(Austrian Football Association) Austria Lustenau
7	FW	**Adrian Grbić**	4 August 1996 (aged 18)			(German Football Association) VfB Stuttgart
8	MF	Sascha Horvath	22 August 1996 (aged 18)			(Austrian Football Association) Sturm Graz
9	FW	Marko Kvasina	20 December 1996 (aged 18)			(Austrian Football Association) Austria Wien
10	MF	**Xaver Schlager**	28 September 1997 (aged 17)			(Austrian Football Association) FC Liefering
11	DF	Petar Gluhakovic	25 March 1996 (aged 19)			(Austrian Football Association) Austria Wien
12	MF	Philipp Malicsek	3 June 1997 (aged 18)			(Austrian Football Association) Admira Wacker Mödling
15	DF	David Domej	8 January 1996 (aged 19)			(Croatian Football Federation) Hajduk Split
16	DF	Manuel Haas	7 May 1996 (aged 19)			(Austrian Football Association) FC Liefering
17	FW	Felipe Dorta	17 June 1996 (aged 19)			(Austrian Football Association) LASK Linz
18	MF	Dominik Prokop	2 June 1997 (aged 18)			(Austrian Football Association) Austria Wien
19	FW	Daniel Ripić	14 March 1996 (aged 19)			(German Football Association) VfB Stuttgart
20	FW	Tobias Pellegrini	3 April 1996 (aged 19)			(Austrian Football Association) LASK Linz
21	GK	**Alexander Schlager**	1 February 1996 (aged 19)			(Austrian Football Association) Grödig

=== France ===
On 8 June 2015, France named their squad.

Head coach: Patrick Gonfalone

No.	Pos.	Player	Date of birth (age)	Caps	Goals	Club
1	GK	Florian Escales	3 February 1996 (aged 19)			(French Football Federation) Marseille
2	DF	**Angelo Fulgini**	20 August 1996 (aged 18)			(French Football Federation) Valenciennes
3	DF	Nicolas Senzemba	25 March 1996 (aged 19)			(French Football Federation) Sochaux
4	DF	**Mouctar Diakhaby**	19 December 1996 (aged 18)			(French Football Federation) Lyon
5	DF	**Abdou Diallo**	4 May 1996 (aged 19)			(French Football Federation) Monaco
6	MF	**Olivier Kemen**	20 July 1996 (aged 18)			(The Football Association) Newcastle United
7	FW	**Maxwel Cornet**	27 September 1996 (aged 18)			(French Football Federation) Lyon
8	MF	Samed Kılıç	28 January 1996 (aged 19)			(French Football Federation) Auxerre
9	FW	**Serhou Guirassy**	12 March 1996 (aged 19)			(French Football Federation) Stade Lavallois
10	MF	**Kingsley Coman**	13 June 1996 (aged 19)			(Italian Football Federation) Juventus
11	FW	Neal Maupay	14 August 1996 (aged 18)			(French Football Federation) Nice
12	FW	Moussa Dembélé	12 July 1996 (aged 18)			(The Football Association) Fulham
13	MF	Alexis Blin	16 September 1996 (aged 18)			(French Football Federation) Toulouse
14	DF	**Lucas Hernandez**	14 February 1996 (aged 19)			(Royal Spanish Football Federation) Atlético Madrid
15	DF	**Benjamin Pavard**	28 March 1996 (aged 19)			(French Football Federation) Lille
16	GK	**Bingourou Kamara**	21 October 1996 (aged 18)			(French Football Federation) Tours
17	MF	Lucas Tousart	27 April 1997 (aged 18)			(French Football Federation) Valenciennes
18	FW	**Marcus Thuram**	6 August 1997 (aged 17)			(French Football Federation) Sochaux

== Group B ==
=== Germany ===
On 18 June 2015, Germany named their squad. On 6 July 2015, final changes to the squad were made due to injuries.

Head coach: Marcus Sorg

No.	Pos.	Player	Date of birth (age)	Caps	Goals	Club
1	GK	Marius Funk	1 January 1996 (aged 19)			(German Football Association) VfB Stuttgart
2	DF	**Lukas Klostermann**	3 June 1996 (aged 19)			(German Football Association) RB Leipzig
3	DF	Lukas Klünter	26 May 1996 (aged 19)			(German Football Association) 1. FC Köln
5	DF	**Jonathan Tah**	11 February 1996 (aged 19)			(German Football Association) Hamburger SV
6	DF	**Thilo Kehrer**	21 September 1996 (aged 18)			(German Football Association) Schalke 04
7	MF	**Nadiem Amiri**	27 October 1996 (aged 18)			(German Football Association) 1899 Hoffenheim
8	FW	**Luca Waldschmidt**	19 May 1996 (aged 19)			(German Football Association) Eintracht Frankfurt
9	FW	**Timo Werner**	6 March 1996 (aged 19)			(German Football Association) VfB Stuttgart
10	MF	Lucas Cueto	24 March 1996 (aged 19)			(German Football Association) 1. FC Köln
11	FW	**Leroy Sané**	11 January 1996 (aged 19)			(German Football Association) Schalke 04
12	GK	Raif Husić	5 February 1996 (aged 19)			(German Football Association) Werder Bremen
13	MF	Max Christiansen	25 September 1996 (aged 18)			(German Football Association) FC Ingolstadt
14	FW	Gianluca Rizzo	6 November 1996 (aged 18)			(German Football Association) Borussia Mönchengladbach
15	MF	Boubacar Barry	15 April 1996 (aged 19)			(German Football Association) Karlsruher SC
16	MF	Erdal Öztürk	7 February 1996 (aged 19)			(German Football Association) 1899 Hoffenheim
18	DF	Jonas Föhrenbach	26 January 1996 (aged 19)			(German Football Association) SC Freiburg
19	DF	Niko Kijewski	28 March 1996 (aged 19)			(German Football Association) Eintracht Braunschweig
20	DF	Jannik Dehm	2 May 1996 (aged 19)			(German Football Association) Karlsruher SC

=== Spain ===
On 22 June 2015, Spain announced 24-man preliminary list. On 4 July 2015, Spain named their final squad.

Head coach: Luis de la Fuente

No.	Pos.	Player	Date of birth (age)	Caps	Goals	Club
1	GK	Antonio Sivera	11 August 1996 (aged 18)			(Royal Spanish Football Federation) Valencia
2	DF	Antonio Marín	17 June 1996 (aged 19)			(Royal Spanish Football Federation) Almería
3	DF	Aarón Martín	22 April 1997 (aged 18)			(Royal Spanish Football Federation) Espanyol
4	DF	Jorge Meré	17 April 1997 (aged 18)			(Royal Spanish Football Federation) Sporting Gijón
5	DF	José Carlos	10 May 1996 (aged 19)			(Royal Spanish Football Federation) Betis
6	MF	**Mikel Merino**	22 June 1996 (aged 19)			(Royal Spanish Football Federation) Osasuna
7	FW	David Concha	20 November 1996 (aged 18)			(Royal Spanish Football Federation) Real Sociedad
8	MF	**Dani Ceballos**	7 August 1996 (aged 18)			(Royal Spanish Football Federation) Betis
9	FW	Borja Mayoral	5 April 1997 (aged 18)			(Royal Spanish Football Federation) Real Madrid
10	MF	**Marco Asensio**	21 January 1996 (aged 19)			(Royal Spanish Football Federation) Mallorca
11	MF	Matías Nahuel	22 October 1996 (aged 18)			(Royal Spanish Football Federation) Villarreal
13	GK	**Unai Simón**	11 June 1997 (aged 18)			(Royal Spanish Football Federation) Athletic Bilbao
14	MF	**Rodri**	22 June 1996 (aged 19)			(Royal Spanish Football Federation) Villarreal
15	DF	Jesús Vallejo	5 January 1997 (aged 18)			(Royal Spanish Football Federation) Zaragoza
16	MF	**Pape Cheikh Diop**	8 August 1997 (aged 17)			(Royal Spanish Football Federation) Celta Vigo
17	FW	**Alfonso Pedraza**	9 April 1996 (aged 19)			(Royal Spanish Football Federation) Villarreal
18	DF	Borja San Emeterio	16 March 1997 (aged 18)			(Royal Spanish Football Federation) Racing Santander
19	FW	Carlos Fernández	22 May 1996 (aged 19)			(Royal Spanish Football Federation) Sevilla

=== Netherlands ===
On 19 June 2015, Netherlands announced 28-man preliminary list. On 1 July 2015, Netherlands named their final squad.

Head coach: Aron Winter

No.	Pos.	Player	Date of birth (age)	Caps	Goals	Club
1	GK	Joël Drommel	16 November 1996 (aged 18)			(Royal Dutch Football Association) Twente
2	DF	Leeroy Owusu	13 August 1996 (aged 18)			(Royal Dutch Football Association) Ajax
3	DF	Terry Lartey Sanniez	10 August 1996 (aged 18)			(Royal Dutch Football Association) Ajax
4	DF	Damon Mirani	13 May 1996 (aged 19)			(Royal Dutch Football Association) Ajax
5	MF	**Kenneth Paal**	24 June 1997 (aged 18)			(Royal Dutch Football Association) PSV Eindhoven
6	MF	**Laros Duarte**	28 February 1997 (aged 18)			(Royal Dutch Football Association) Sparta Rotterdam
7	FW	**Issa Kallon**	3 January 1996 (aged 19)			(Royal Dutch Football Association) Utrecht
8	MF	Abdelhak Nouri	2 April 1997 (aged 18)			(Royal Dutch Football Association) Ajax
9	FW	Pelle van Amersfoort	1 April 1996 (aged 19)			(Royal Dutch Football Association) Heerenveen
10	MF	**Frenkie de Jong**	12 May 1997 (aged 18)			(Royal Dutch Football Association) Willem II
11	FW	Bilal Ould-Chikh	28 July 1997 (aged 17)			(Royal Dutch Football Association) Twente
12	FW	**Gervane Kastaneer**	9 June 1996 (aged 19)			(Royal Dutch Football Association) ADO Den Haag
13	DF	Julian Lelieveld	9 July 1997 (aged 17)			(Royal Dutch Football Association) Vitesse
14	FW	Tarik Kada	26 May 1996 (aged 19)			(Royal Dutch Football Association) Heerenveen
15	DF	**Augustine Loof**	1 January 1996 (aged 19)			(Royal Dutch Football Association) PSV Eindhoven
16	GK	Yanick van Osch	24 March 1997 (aged 18)			(Royal Dutch Football Association) PSV Eindhoven
17	MF	Thomas Ouwejan	24 June 1996 (aged 19)			(Royal Dutch Football Association) AZ
18	MF	Michel Vlap	2 June 1997 (aged 18)			(Royal Dutch Football Association) Heerenveen

=== Russia ===
On 19 June 2015, Russia announced a 23-man preliminary list.

Head coach: Dmitri Khomukha

No.	Pos.	Player	Date of birth (age)	Caps	Goals	Club
1	GK	Anton Mitryushkin	8 February 1996 (aged 19)			(Russian Football Union) Spartak Moscow
2	MF	Sergey Makarov	3 October 1996 (aged 18)			(Russian Football Union) Lokomotiv Moscow
3	DF	**Nikita Chernov**	16 January 1996 (aged 19)			(Russian Football Union) CSKA Moscow
4	DF	Dzhamaldin Khodzhaniyazov	18 July 1996 (aged 18)			(Russian Football Union) Zenit Saint Petersburg
5	DF	Denis Yakuba	26 May 1996 (aged 19)			(Russian Football Union) Kuban Krasnodar
7	MF	Ayaz Guliyev	27 November 1996 (aged 18)			(Russian Football Union) Spartak Moscow
8	MF	**Dmitri Barinov**	11 September 1996 (aged 18)			(Russian Football Union) Lokomotiv Moscow
9	FW	**Ramil Sheydayev**	15 March 1996 (aged 19)			(Russian Football Union) Zenit Saint Petersburg
10	MF	**Aleksandr Golovin**	30 May 1996 (aged 19)			(Russian Football Union) CSKA Moscow
11	FW	Aleksandr Zuyev	26 June 1996 (aged 19)			(Russian Football Union) Spartak Moscow
12	GK	Maksim Rudakov	22 January 1996 (aged 19)			(Russian Football Union) Zenit Saint Petersburg
14	DF	Aleksandr Likhachyov	22 July 1996 (aged 18)			(Russian Football Union) Spartak Moscow
15	MF	Ilmir Nurisov	5 August 1996 (aged 18)			(Russian Football Union) Kuban Krasnodar
16	MF	Georgi Melkadze	4 April 1997 (aged 18)			(Russian Football Union) Spartak Moscow
17	MF	Igor Bezdenezhnykh	8 August 1996 (aged 18)			(Russian Football Union) Ufa
19	FW	Aleksei Gasilin	1 March 1996 (aged 19)			(Russian Football Union) Zenit Saint Petersburg
21	FW	**Rifat Zhemaletdinov**	20 September 1996 (aged 18)			(Russian Football Union) Lokomotiv Moscow
23	DF	Vasili Cherov	13 January 1996 (aged 19)			(Russian Football Union) Krasnodar
