= Slovakia at the FIFA U-17 World Cup =

The Slovakia national under-17 football team has represented Slovakia at the FIFA U-17 World Cup on one occasion, in 2013.

== FIFA U-17 World Cup record ==
FIFA U-17 World Cup record
Year	Result	Pld	W	D *	L	GF	GA
(Japan) 1993	Country part of Czechoslovakia						
(Ecuador) 1995	Did not qualify						
(Egypt) 1997	Did not qualify						
(New Zealand) 1999	Did not qualify						
(Trinidad and Tobago) 2001	Did not qualify						
(Finland) 2003	Did not qualify						
(Peru) 2005	Did not qualify						
(South Korea) 2007	Did not qualify						
(Nigeria) 2009	Did not qualify						
(Mexico) 2011	Did not qualify						
(United Arab Emirates) 2013	Round of 16	4	1	1	2	7	12
(Chile) 2015	Did not qualify						
(India) 2017	Did not qualify						
(Brazil) 2019	Did not qualify						
(Peru) 2021	Cancelled						
(Peru) 2023	To be determined						
Total	1/14	4	1	1	2	7	12

FIFA U-17 World Cup history
Year	Round	Date	Opponent	Result	Stadium
(United Arab Emirates) 2013	Group stage	17 October	Brazil	L 1–6	Mohammed bin Zayed Stadium, Abu Dhabi
(United Arab Emirates) 2013	Group stage	20 October	Honduras	D 2–2	Mohammed bin Zayed Stadium, Abu Dhabi
(United Arab Emirates) 2013	Group stage	23 October	United Arab Emirates	W 2–0	Mohammed bin Zayed Stadium, Abu Dhabi
(United Arab Emirates) 2013	Round of 16	29 October	Uruguay	L 2–4	Emirates Club Stadium, Ras al-Khaimah

=== Record by opponent ===
FIFA U-17 World Cup matches (by team)
Opponent	Pld	W	D	L	GF	GA
Brazil	1	0	0	1	1	6
Honduras	1	0	1	0	2	2
United Arab Emirates	1	1	0	0	2	0
Uruguay	1	0	0	1	2	4

== 2013 FIFA U-17 World Cup ==
=== Group A ===
Team	Pld	W	D	L	GF	GA	GD	Pts
Brazil	3	3	0	0	15	2	+13	9
Honduras	3	1	1	1	4	6	−2	4
Slovakia	3	1	1	1	5	8	−3	4
United Arab Emirates	3	0	0	3	2	10	−8	0

Source: RSSSF
17 October 2013
17:00

Brazil	6–1	Slovakia
Mosquito 17', 30' (pen.), 70'; Nathan 45+2', 51'; Caio 56'	Report	Vavro 68'

Mohammed Bin Zayed Stadium, Abu Dhabi
Attendance: 8,650
Referee: Marco Rodríguez (Mexico)
20 October 2013
17:00

Slovakia	2–2	Honduras
Vestenický 48', 57'	Report	Flores 20'; Bodden 90+2'

Mohammed Bin Zayed Stadium, Abu Dhabi
Attendance: 8,200
Referee: Abdulrahman Abdou (Qatar)
23 October 2013
20:00

Slovakia	2–0	United Arab Emirates
Vestenický 36', 58'	Report

Mohammed Bin Zayed Stadium, Abu Dhabi
Attendance: 3,642
Referee: Juan Soto (Venezuela)

29 October 2013
17:00

Uruguay	4–2	Slovakia
Otormín 5', 58'; Méndez 34' (pen.); Acosta 42'	Report	Vestenický 63'; Siplak 85'

Emirates Club Stadium, Ras al-Khaimah
Attendance: 2,215
Referee: Marco Rodríguez (Mexico)

== Goalscorers ==
Player	Goals	2013
Tomáš Vestenický	5	5
Denis Vavro	1	1
Michal Siplak	1	1
Total	7	7
