= Johan Ramhorn =

Swedish footballer

Personal information
- Full name: Per Johan Ramhorn
- Date of birth: 3 May 1996 (age 30)
- Place of birth: Sweden
- Height: 1.78 m (5 ft 10 in)
- Position: Defender

Youth career
- 2002–2008: Oxie IF
- 2009–2012: Real Malmö FC
- 2013–2014: Kalmar FF

Senior career*
Years	Team	Apps	(Gls)
2014–2018	Kalmar FF	4	(0)
2016	→ GAIS (loan)	21	(2)
2017	→ Åtvidaberg (loan)	25	(0)

International career
2012–2013	Sweden U17	22	(0)
2013–2015	Sweden U19	9	(0)
- * Club domestic league appearances and goals as of 30 November 2017

Johan Ramhorn (born 3 May 1996) is a Swedish former footballer who most recently played for Kalmar FF as a defender.

His twin brother, Sebastian, also played for Kalmar FF and they have followed each other much throughout their careers.

== Honours ==
Sweden U17

- FIFA U-17 World Cup Third place: 2013
