= Anatolie Nikolaesh =

Russian-Moldavan footballer

Personal information
- Full name: Anatolie Valeryevich Nikolaesh
- Date of birth: 17 April 1996 (age 30)
- Place of birth: Bălți, Moldova
- Height: 1.74 m (5 ft 8 1/2 in)
- Position: Defender

Youth career
- –2012: MFK Dina Moskva
- 2012–2013: PFC CSKA Moscow

Senior career*
Years	Team	Apps	(Gls)
2013–2015	PFC CSKA Moscow	0	(0)
2016–2017	União de Leiria	20	(0)
2017–2018	Vitória Guimarães B	1	(0)
2018–2019	União de Leiria	13	(0)
2019–2020	FC Kolomna	8	(0)

International career
2012	Russia U-16	2	(0)
2012–2013	Russia U-17	11	(0)
2014	Russia U-18	9	(0)
- * Club domestic league appearances and goals

Anatolie Valeryevich Nikolaesh (Russian: Анатолие Валерьевич Николаеш; born 17 April 1996) is a Russian former football player of Moldovan descent.

== Club career ==
He made his debut in the LigaPro for Vitória Guimarães B on 19 August 2017 in a game against Sporting Covilhã and was sent off early in the second half.

== International ==
He won the 2013 UEFA European Under-17 Championship with Russia national under-17 football team and played with it at the 2013 FIFA U-17 World Cup.
