= Nutsu Ardelyan =

Ukrainian footballer

Personal information
- Full name: Nutsu Nutsovych Ardelyan
- Date of birth: 18 June 1996 (age 30)
- Place of birth: Uzhhorod, Ukraine
- Position: Forward

Youth career
- 2011–2013: RVUFK Kyiv
- 2013–2015: Dnipro Dnipropetrovsk

Senior career*
| Years | Team | Apps | (Gls) |
| 2015–2016 | Oleksandriya | 0 | (0) |
| 2015–2016 | Slavoj Sečovce (loan) | 5 | (6) |
| 2016 | Vilkhivtsi | 13 | (4) |
| 2016 | Mynai | 6 | (2) |
| 2017 | Uzhhorod | | |
| 2017 | Merani Martvili | | |
| 2017–2018 | Svitanok-Agrosvit Shlyakhova | | |
| 2019–2020 | Monolit Kozyatyn | | |
| 2024– | Toronto Falcons | | |

International career
| 2013 | Ukraine U17 | 1 | (0) |
- * Club domestic league appearances and goals

Nutsu Ardelyan (Ukrainian: Нуцу Нуцович Арделян; born June 18, 1996) is a Ukrainian footballer who plays forward with the Toronto Falcons.

== Club career ==
=== Europe ===
Ardelyan began his career at the youth level with RVUFK Kyiv. Following his training with RVUFK, he signed a contract with Dnipro Dnipropetrovsk in 2014 and was placed with the under-19 team. After two seasons with Dnipro, he signed with Oleksandriya. He played abroad in Slovakia with FK Slavoj Sečovce on a loan spell. After failing to break into the senior team, he left Oleksandriya in December 2015.

In 2016, he returned to his native region to sign with FC Vilkhivtsi. His stint with Vilkhivtsi was short-lived as he signed with league rivals Mynai. In 2017, he remained in the Zakarpattia region to play with Uzhhorod. In the summer of 2017, Ardelyan signed with Merani Martvili in the Georgian Erovnuli Liga 2.

Following his stint in the Caucasus region, he returned to Ukraine in 2018 to play with Svitanok-Agrosvit Shlyakhova. In 2020, he played with Monolit Kozyatyn.

=== Canada ===
In the summer of 2024, he played abroad in the Canadian Soccer League with the Toronto Falcons. Ardelyan recorded his first hat trick for the club on July 28, 2024, against Hamilton City.

== International career ==
Ardelyan was selected to represent the Ukraine national under-17 football team in the 2013 UEFA European Under-17 Championship. He debuted in the tournament on May 11, 2013, against Croatia.

== Personal life ==
He is of Romanian descent from his father's side.
