= Slovakia national under-17 football team =

National U-17 association football team

Slovakia Under-17
- Nickname(s): Repre; Sokoli (The Falcons)
- Association: Slovenský futbalový zväz
- Confederation: UEFA (Europe)
- Head coach: Marek Bažík
- FIFA code: SVK
| First colours | Second colours |

European Championship
- Appearances: 2 (first in 2013)
- Best result: Semi-finals (2013)

FIFA U-17 World Cup
- Appearances: 1 (first in 2013)
- Best result: Round of 16 (2013)

The Slovakia national under-17 football team, controlled by the Slovak Football Association, is Slovakia's national under-17 football team and is considered to be a feeder team for the Slovakia U18 team. The team has qualified for the final tournament of the FIFA U-17 World Cup once.

== Competition history ==
=== FIFA U-17 World Cup ===
==== Championship record ====
FIFA U-17 World Cup record
| Year | Result | Pld | W | D* | L | GF | GA | Squad |
|---|---|---|---|---|---|---|---|---|
| (Japan) 1993 | Country part of Czechoslovakia | | | | | | | |
| (Ecuador) 1995 | did not qualify | | | | | | | |
| (Egypt) 1997 | did not qualify | | | | | | | |
| (New Zealand) 1999 | did not qualify | | | | | | | |
| (Trinidad and Tobago) 2001 | did not qualify | | | | | | | |
| (Finland) 2003 | did not qualify | | | | | | | |
| (Peru) 2005 | did not qualify | | | | | | | |
| (South Korea) 2007 | did not qualify | | | | | | | |
| (Nigeria) 2009 | did not qualify | | | | | | | |
| (Mexico) 2011 | did not qualify | | | | | | | |
| (United Arab Emirates) 2013 | Round of 16 | 4 | 1 | 1 | 2 | 7 | 12 | Squad |
| (Chile) 2015 | did not qualify | | | | | | | |
| (India) 2017 | did not qualify | | | | | | | |
| (Brazil) 2019 | did not qualify | | | | | | | |
| (Indonesia) 2023 | did not qualify | | | | | | | |
| (Qatar) 2025 | did not qualify | | | | | | | |
| (Qatar) 2026 | did not qualify | | | | | | | |
| (Qatar) 2027 | To be determined | | | | | | | |
| (Qatar) 2028 | To be determined | | | | | | | |
| (Qatar) 2029 | To be determined | | | | | | | |
| Total | 1/15 | 4 | 1 | 1 | 2 | 7 | 12 | |

List of FIFA U-17 World Cup matches
| Year | Round | Score | Result | Slovakia goalscorers |
|---|---|---|---|---|
| 2013 | Round 1 | Brazil 6 – 1 Slovakia | Loss | Vavro |
| 2013 | Round 1 | Slovakia 2 – 2 Honduras | Draw | Vestenický (2) |
| 2013 | Round 1 | Slovakia 2 – 0 United Arab Emirates | Win | Vestenický (2) |
| 2013 | Round of 16 | Uruguay 4 – 2 Slovakia | Loss | Vestenický, Siplak |

=== UEFA European Under-17 Championship ===
==== Championship record ====
| Year | Round | Pld | W | D | L | GF | GA | Squad |
|---|---|---|---|---|---|---|---|---|
| (Denmark) 2002 | did not qualify | | | | | | | – |
| (Portugal) 2003 | did not qualify | | | | | | | – |
| (France) 2004 | did not qualify | | | | | | | – |
| (Italy) 2005 | Elite qualifying stage | | | | | | | – |
| (Luxembourg) 2006 | Elite qualifying stage | | | | | | | – |
| (Belgium) 2007 | Elite qualifying stage | | | | | | | – |
| (Turkey) 2008 | Elite qualifying stage | | | | | | | – |
| (Germany) 2009 | First qualifying stage | | | | | | | – |
| (Liechtenstein) 2010 | Elite qualifying stage | | | | | | | – |
| (Serbia) 2011 | Elite qualifying stage | | | | | | | – |
| (Slovenia) 2012 | First qualifying stage | | | | | | | – |
| (Slovakia) 2013 | Semi-finals | 4 | 1 | 2 | 1 | 3 | 4 | Squad |
| (Malta) 2014 | First qualifying stage | | | | | | | – |
| (Bulgaria) 2015 | Elite qualifying stage | | | | | | | – |
| (Azerbaijan) 2016 | Elite qualifying stage | | | | | | | – |
| (Croatia) 2017 | Elite qualifying stage | | | | | | | – |
| (England) 2018 | Elite qualifying stage | | | | | | | – |
| (Republic of Ireland) 2019 | Elite qualifying stage | | | | | | | – |
| (Estonia) 2020 | Cancelled due to COVID-19 pandemic | | | | | | | |
| (Cyprus) 2021 | Cancelled due to COVID-19 pandemic | | | | | | | |
| (Israel) 2022 | Elite qualifying stage | | | | | | | – |
| (Hungary) 2023 | Elite qualifying stage | | | | | | | – |
| (Cyprus) 2024 | Group stage | 3 | 0 | 1 | 2 | 0 | 6 | Squad |
| (Albania) 2025 | Elite qualifying stage | | | | | | | – |
| (Estonia) 2026 | Second qualifying stage | | | | | | | – |
| (Latvia) 2027 | To be determined | | | | | | | |
| (Lithuania) 2028 | To be determined | | | | | | | |
| (Moldova) 2029 | To be determined | | | | | | | |
| Total | 2/22 | 7 | 1 | 3 | 3 | 3 | 10 | |

List of UEFA Euro U-17 matches
| Year | Round | Score | Result | Slovakia goalscorers |
|---|---|---|---|---|
| 2013 | Round 1 | Slovakia 1 – 0 Austria | Win | Slaninka |
| 2013 | Round 1 | Slovakia 2 – 2 Switzerland | Draw | Varga, Slaninka |
| 2013 | Round 1 | Sweden 0 – 0 Slovakia | Draw | |
| 2013 | Semi-finals | Slovakia 0 – 2Italy | Loss | |
| 2024 | Round 1 | Slovakia 0 – 0 Sweden | Draw | |
| 2024 | Round 1 | Italy 2 – 0 Slovakia | Loss | |
| 2024 | Round 1 | Poland 4 – 0 Slovakia | Loss | |

== Players ==
=== Current squad ===
The following players were called up for the most recent 2026 UEFA European Under-17 Championship qualification matches.

| No. | Pos. | Player | Date of birth (age) | Club |
|---|---|---|---|---|
| 1 | GK | Filip Kalanin | 30 August 2009 (age 17) | (Slovak Football Association) Košice |
| | GK | Dušan Perniš | 4 January 2009 (age 17) | (German Football Association) Wolfsburg |
| | DF | Mark Cingel | 8 April 2009 (age 17) | (Scottish Football Association) Celtic |
| 5 | DF | Matúš Ivan | 4 January 2009 (age 17) | (Slovak Football Association) Košice |
| 13 | DF | Lukáš Líška | 25 February 2009 (age 17) | (Slovak Football Association) Podbrezová |
| 15 | DF | Michal Saxa | 5 November 2009 (age 17) | (Slovak Football Association) Košice |
| 19 | DF | Marián Masarik | 4 April 2009 (age 17) | (Slovak Football Association) Slovan Bratislava |
| 4 | DF | Tomáš Ďurko (captain) | 15 March 2009 (age 17) | (Slovak Football Association) Košice |
| 3 | DF | Tomáš Zemko | 2 September 2009 (age 17) | (Italian Football Federation) Fiorentina |
| 8 | MF | Peter Iuhanyak | 17 February 2009 (age 17) | (Slovak Football Association) Slovan Bratislava |
| 17 | MF | Marko Václavek | 15 January 2009 (age 17) | (Slovak Football Association) Žilina |
| 18 | MF | Tobias Jan Mirko | 1 June 2009 (age 17) | (Slovak Football Association) Ružomberok |
| 22 | MF | Samo Fouky | 8 January 2009 (age 17) | (Swiss Football Association) Servette |
| 10 | MF | Leo Hofstädter | 9 October 2009 (age 17) | (Slovak Football Association) Slovan Bratislava |
| 7 | FW | Lucas Szomolányi | 14 March 2009 (age 17) | (Austrian Football Association) Rapid Wien |
| 11 | FW | Matúš Tomáško | 30 November 2009 (age 16) | (Slovak Football Association) Slovan Bratislava |
| 9 | FW | Simon Sevcik | 19 March 2009 (age 17) | (Football Association of the Czech Republic) Ostrava |
| 14 | FW | Michal Duraj | 1 August 2009 (age 17) | (Slovak Football Association) Podbrezová |
| 16 | FW | Tomáš Bojčík | 1 July 2009 (age 17) | (Football Association of the Czech Republic) Ostrava |
| 20 | FW | Jakub Holek | 15 February 2009 (age 17) | (Slovak Football Association) Banská Bystrica |
| 21 | FW | Alex Šubert | 5 February 2010 (age 16) | (Slovak Football Association) Trenčín |

== See also ==
- Slovakia at the FIFA U-17 World Cup
- Slovakia national football team
- Slovakia national under-21 football team
- Slovakia national under-19 football team
- Slovakia national under-18 football team
- Slovakia national under-16 football team
