= Vittorio Parigini =

Italian footballer (born 1996)

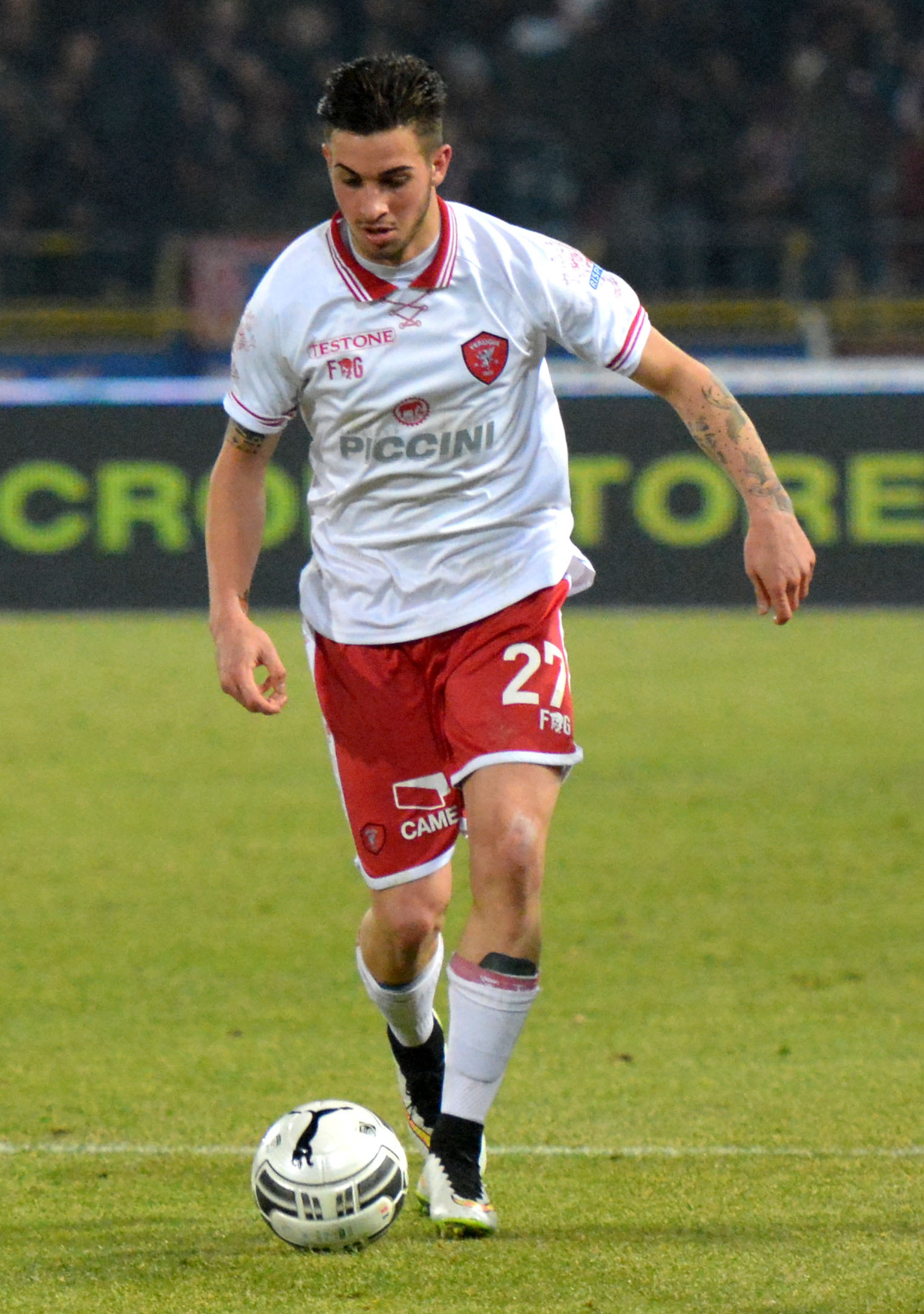
- Parigini in 2015 playing for Perugia

Personal information
- Date of birth: 25 March 1996 (age 30)
- Place of birth: Moncalieri, Italy
- Height: 1.81 m (5 ft 11 in)
- Position: Winger

Team information
- Current team: Ostiamare
- Number: 11

Youth career
- 2000–2006: Pancalieri
- 2006–2013: Torino

Senior career*
Years	Team	Apps	(Gls)
2013–2020	Torino	17	(0)
2013–2014	→ Juve Stabia (loan)	14	(0)
2014–2016	→ Perugia (loan)	49	(8)
2016	→ Chievo (loan)	3	(0)
2017	→ Bari (loan)	15	(1)
2017–2018	→ Benevento (loan)	21	(0)
2020–2023	Genoa	4	(0)
2020	→ Cremonese (loan)	15	(3)
2021	→ Ascoli (loan)	10	(0)
2021–2023	→ Como (loan)	58	(2)
2023–2024	Feralpisalò	13	(0)
2024	Lecco	13	(0)
2024–2025	Cerignola	10	(0)
2025	SPAL	12	(2)
2025–2026	Siracusa	15	(2)
2026	Sambenedettese	12	(0)
2026–	Ostiamare	1	(0)

International career
2011–2012	Italy U16	7	(0)
2012–2013	Italy U17	17	(3)
2013–2014	Italy U18	2	(1)
2014–2015	Italy U19	11	(4)
2015	Italy U20	1	(0)
2015–2017	Italy U21	21	(7)
- * Club domestic league appearances and goals as of 23 August 2026

Vittorio Parigini (born 25 March 1996) is an Italian professional footballer who plays as a forward for Serie C Group B club Ostiamare.

== Early life ==
Born in Piedmont from a southern family, his mother is a native of Atripalda, in the province of Avellino.

== Club career ==
=== Early career ===
Parigini began playing football with Pancalieri, an amateur club on the outskirts of Turin. Spotted by Silvano Benedetti, he entered the Torino youth system at age 10 after a three-day trial with the club. He had a strong showing in the Allievi Nazionali and the Primavera under the youth coach Moreno Longo.

In 2013, at age 17, he was loaned to Juve Stabia in Serie B in his first season among the professionals. He disputed 14 games (including five as a starter), but did not score.

==== Loan to Perugia ====
The following year he returned to Serie B on loan to newly promoted Perugia. He made his debut with the Umbrians on 23 August 2014 in the second round of Coppa Italia against Spezia (2–1), scoring the winning goal in extra time. He made his debut for the club in the league on 30 August against Bologna (2–1), where he entered as a substitute and provided the assist on the winning goal for Diego Falcinelli. On 8 November he scored his first goal in the league against Virtus Entella. He concluded his first season with Perugia with 33 appearances and five goals, achieving the promotional playoffs where Perugia was eliminated by Pescara.

In the summer of 2015 the loan was renewed and Parigini returned to Umbria. In his second season with Perugia he suffered a muscular tear, which sidelined him for four months, concluding the season with four goals in 19 league games.

==== Loans to Chievo and Bari ====
In the summer of 2016, Parigini was loaned to Serie A club Chievo. He made his debut on 13 September 2016, entering as a substitute in a home victory against Virtus Entella (3–0) in the third round of Coppa Italia. He made his Serie A debut eight days later, at age 20, in a 2–0 win at home against Inter Milan.

In January 2017, he moved on loan to Bari in Serie B. He scored his first goal for the Galetti on 27 February 2017 in a 2–0 win over Brescia.

==== Loan to Benevento ====
On 31 August 2017, Parigini joined Benevento on loan until June 2018. The deal included an optional buyout clause, which would become obligatory in case the club avoided relegation in the 2017–18 Serie A season.

==== Return to Torino ====
In the summer of 2018, he returned to Torino and placed in the senior squad. On 16 September, he made his first appearance for Torino, entering as a substitute for Álex Berenguer in a 1–1 draw away against Udinese.

=== Genoa ===
==== Loan to Cremonese ====
On 31 January 2020 he transferred to Genoa and was immediately loaned to Cremonese.

==== Loan to Ascoli ====
On 1 February 2021, Parigini moved to Serie B side Ascoli, on a loan deal until the end of the season.

==== Loan to Como ====
On 31 July 2021, he joined Como on a season-long loan. On 6 July 2022, the loan was renewed for the 2022–23 season.

=== Feralpisalò ===
On 28 August 2023, Parigini signed a one-season contract with Feralpisalò.

=== Lecco ===
On 31 January 2024, Parigini moved to Lecco, also in Serie B.

== International career ==
He was a member of the Italy under-17 side which won a silver medal at the 2013 UEFA European Under-17 Championship in Slovakia. He was also a regular of the under-17 side that was eliminated in the round of 16 at the 2013 FIFA U-17 World Cup by Mexico. On 12 May 2014 he was called up to the Italy under-19 side by Alessandro Pane in view of the UEFA Under-19 Championship. On 5 September he scored his first brace for the under-19 in a friendly against Slovakia.

On 5 August 2015, he was called up to Italy under-21 team by Luigi Di Biagio for the first friendly of the new biennium to be played on 12 August in Telki against Hungary. He debuted on 13 October during a 2017 UEFA European Under-21 Championship qualification match against Ireland, in which he scored the winning goal for Italy's victory (1–0).

== Style of play ==
A player with strong offensive skills as well as with physical strength, technique, acceleration and explosiveness. He was a striker until Roberto Fogli, his coach in the "Giovanissimi Nazionali" of Torino, decided to turn him into a winger. Mainly used on the right wing, he can be played with the same effect on the left wing due to his versatility; he has played at good levels even as an attacking midfielder or pure striker. Early in his career he was likened to Alessio Cerci for his movement on the pitch, particularly with regard to speed and his ability to get past his opponent.

== Career statistics ==
=== Club ===
As of 5 June 2019

Club	Season	League			Cup		Europe		Other		Total	
Club	Season	Division	Apps	Goals	Apps	Goals	Apps	Goals	Apps	Goals	Apps	Goals
Juve Stabia (loan)	2013–14	Serie B	14	0	0	0	–		–		14	0
Perugia (loan)	2014–15	Serie B	30	4	2	1	–		1	0	33	5
Perugia (loan)	2015–16	Serie B	19	4	0	0	–		–		19	4
Perugia (loan)	Total		49	8	2	1	—		1	0	52	9
Chievo Verona (loan)	2016–17	Serie A	3	0	2	0	–		–		5	0
Bari (loan)	2016–17	Serie B	15	1	0	0	–		–		15	1
Benevento (loan)	2017–18	Serie A	21	0	0	0	–		–		21	0
Torino	2018–19	Serie A	17	0	1	0	–		–		18	0
Career total			116	9	3	1	—		1	0	120	10

== Honours ==
=== International ===
Italy

- UEFA European Under-17 Championship: Runner-up 2013
