= Manuel Haas =

Austrian footballer

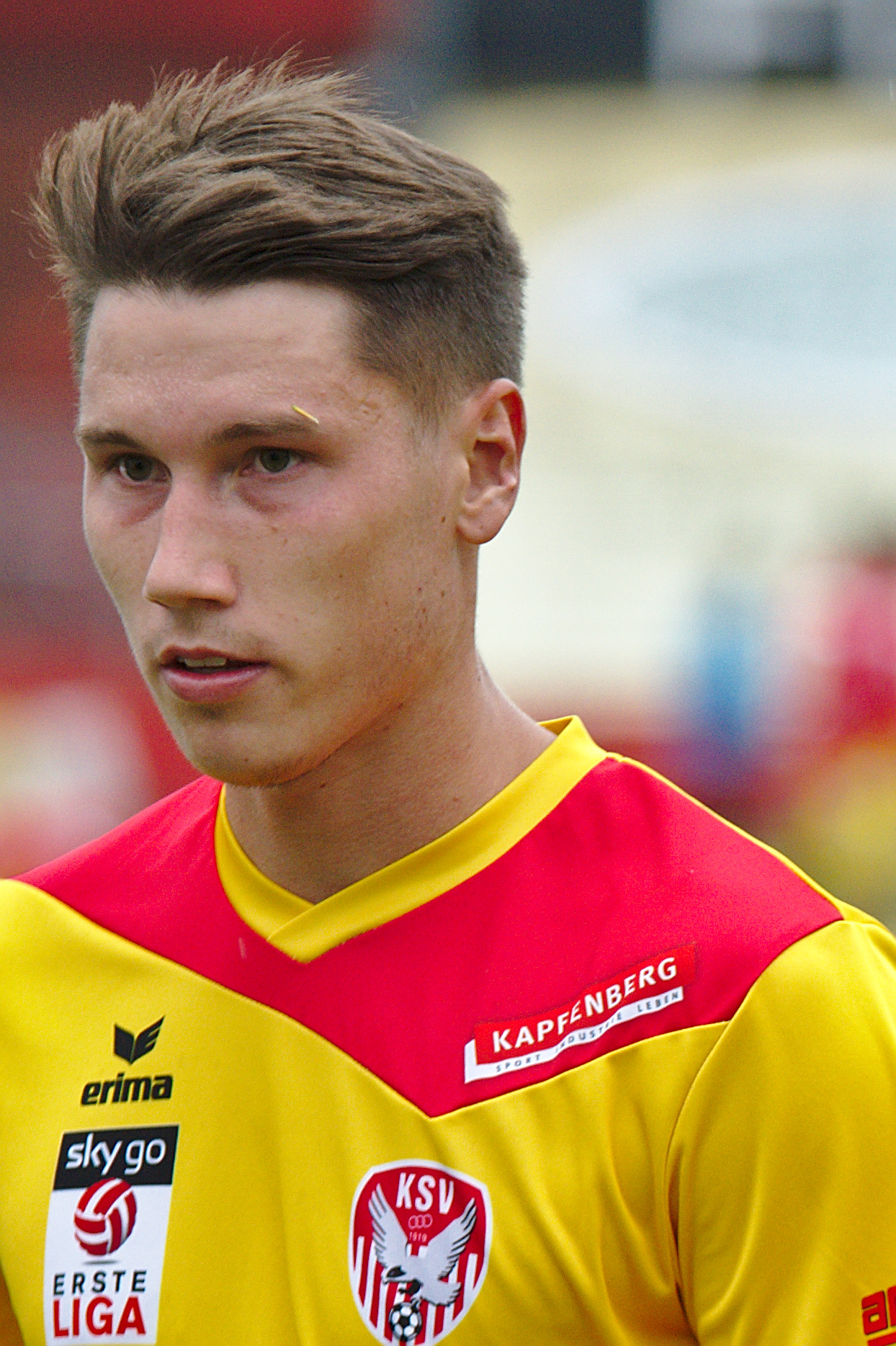
- Haas in 2017

Personal information
- Date of birth: 7 May 1996 (age 30)
- Place of birth: Salzburg, Austria
- Height: 1.80 m (5 ft 11 in)
- Position: Defender

Team information
- Current team: 1. Oberalmer SV

Youth career
- 2001–2007: 1. Oberalmer SV
- 2007–2014: Red Bull Salzburg

Senior career*
Years	Team	Apps	(Gls)
2014–2015	FC Liefering	19	(0)
2015–2018	Kapfenberger SV	97	(6)
2018–2019	SKN St. Pölten	32	(0)
2020	Inter Zaprešić	2	(0)
2020–2021	SV Ried	5	(0)
2021–2023	VfL Osnabrück	30	(0)
2025–	1. Oberalmer SV		

International career
2011	Austria U-16	2	(0)
2012–2013	Austria U-17	11	(0)
2014–2015	Austria U-19	6	(0)
2017–2018	Austria U-21	3	(0)
- * Club domestic league appearances and goals as of 5 July 2023

Manuel Haas (born 7 May 1996) is an Austrian professional footballer who plays for an amateur side 1. Oberalmer SV.

== Club career ==
On 17 August 2020, he signed with SV Ried.

== International career ==
He was the member of Austria Under-17 squad for 2013 UEFA European Under-17 Championship and 2013 FIFA U-17 World Cup, but remained on the bench in all games. He played in the first two games at the 2015 UEFA European Under-19 Championship as Austria was eliminated at group stage.
