= Yegor Rudkovsky =

Russian footballer

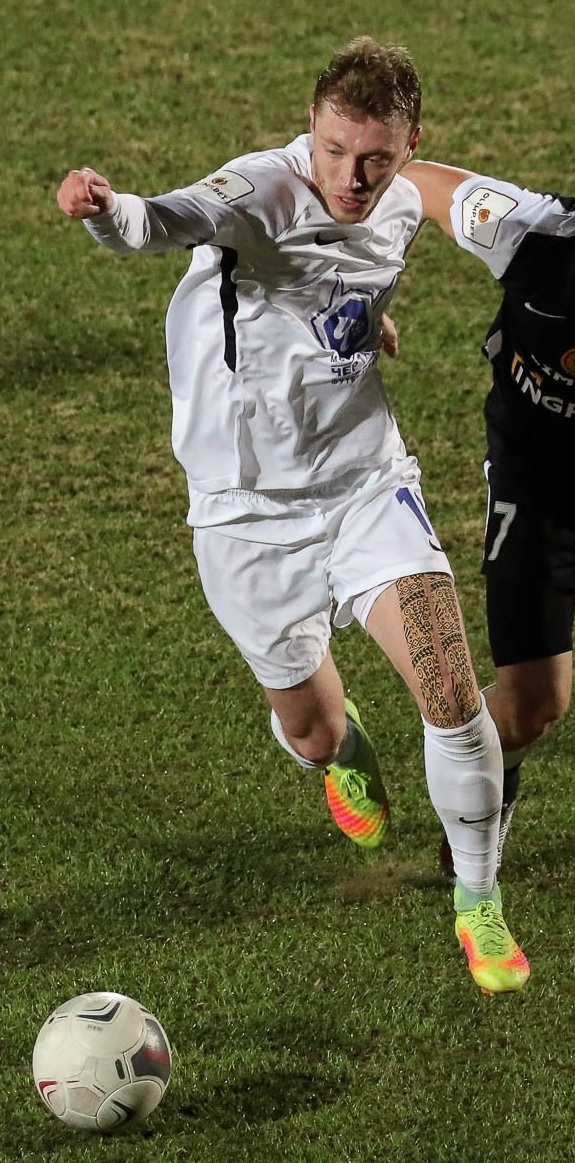
- Rudkovsky with Chertanovo in 2021

Personal information
- Full name: Yegor Alekseyevich Rudkovsky
- Date of birth: 4 March 1996 (age 30)
- Place of birth: Omsk, Russia
- Height: 1.78 m (5 ft 10 in)
- Position: Midfielder

Youth career
- FC Chertanovo Moscow
- 2013–2015: FC Kuban Krasnodar
- 2016–2017: FC Spartak Moscow

Senior career*
Years	Team	Apps	(Gls)
2014–2016	FC Chertanovo Moscow	38	(2)
2016–2019	FC Spartak-2 Moscow	41	(3)
2019–2023	FC Chertanovo Moscow	52	(2)

International career
2011–2012	Russia U16	15	(2)
2012–2013	Russia U17	11	(0)
2014	Russia U18	3	(0)
2016	Russia U21	4	(0)
- * Club domestic league appearances and goals

Yegor Alekseyevich Rudkovsky (Russian: Егор Алексеевич Рудковский; born 4 March 1996) is a Russian former football player.

== Club career ==
He made his professional debut in the Russian Professional Football League for FC Chertanovo Moscow on 22 August 2014 in a game against FC Arsenal-2 Tula.

He made his Russian Football National League debut for FC Spartak-2 Moscow on 16 July 2016 in a game against FC Mordovia Saransk.

== International ==
He won the 2013 UEFA European Under-17 Championship with Russia.
