= Sebastian Ramhorn =

Swedish footballer

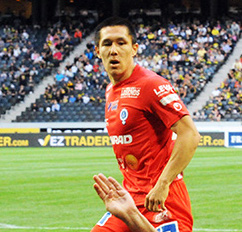

Personal information
- Full name: Sebastian Ramhorn
- Date of birth: 3 May 1996 (age 30)
- Place of birth: Sweden
- Height: 1.80 m (5 ft 11 in)
- Position: Defender

Youth career
- 2002–2008: Oxie IF
- 2009–2012: Real Malmö
- 2012–2013: Kalmar FF

Senior career*
Years	Team	Apps	(Gls)
2014–2018	Kalmar FF	12	(0)
2015–2017	→ Åtvidabergs FF (loan)	26	(2)

International career^{‡}
2012–2013	Sweden U17	26	(0)
2013–2015	Sweden U19	13	(0)
- * Club domestic league appearances and goals as of 24 July 2018 ‡ National team caps and goals as of 31 March 2015

Sebastian Ramhorn (born 3 May 1996) is a Swedish former footballer who played as a defender.

== Career ==
Ramhorn grew up in Malmö where he started out playing for Oxie IF before moving to Real Malmö in his early teens. In the summer of 2012 Sebastian and his twin brother Johan Ramhorn went to trial with Allsvenskan club Kalmar FF and both ended up being signed.

== International career ==
In September 2013 Ramhorn was selected to the Sweden men's national under-17 football team that would compete in the 2013 FIFA U-17 World Cup.

== Honours ==
Sweden U17

- FIFA U-17 World Cup Third place: 2013
