= Vladislav Parshikov =

Russian footballer

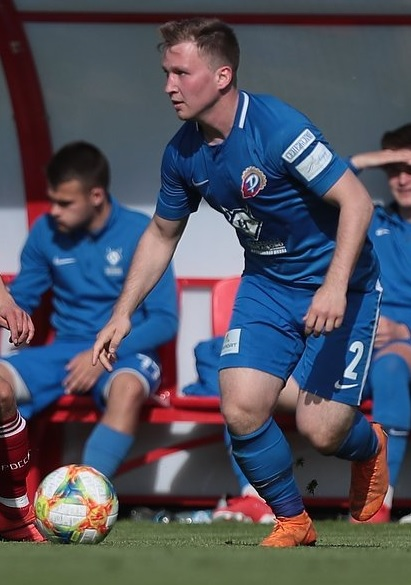
- Parshikov with Chertanovo in 2019

Personal information
- Full name: Vladislav Igorevich Parshikov
- Date of birth: 19 February 1996 (age 30)
- Place of birth: Voronezh, Russia
- Height: 1.66 m (5 ft 5 1/2 in)
- Positions: Defender; midfielder

Youth career
- Chertanovo Education Center

Senior career*
Years	Team	Apps	(Gls)
2014–2019	FC Chertanovo Moscow	114	(3)
2015	→ FC Vybor-Kurbatovo Voronezh (loan)	0	(0)
2015	→ FC Fakel Voronezh (loan)	0	(0)
2020	FC Fakel Voronezh	0	(0)

International career
2011	Russia U-15	1	(0)
2012	Russia U-16	9	(1)
2012–2013	Russia U-17	12	(0)
2014–2015	Russia U-19	5	(0)
2015	Russia U-21	2	(0)
- * Club domestic league appearances and goals

Vladislav Igorevich Parshikov (Russian: Владислав Игоревич Паршиков; born 19 February 1996) is a Russian former football player.

== Club career ==
He made his professional debut in the Russian Professional Football League for FC Chertanovo Moscow on 14 July 2014 in a game against FC Metallurg Lipetsk. He made his Russian Football National League debut for Chertanovo on 17 July 2018 in a game against FC Rotor Volgograd.

== International ==
He won the 2013 UEFA European Under-17 Championship with Russia.
