= Ihor Yarovoy =

Ukrainian footballer

Personal information
- Full name: Ihor Olehovych Yarovoy
- Date of birth: 8 April 1996 (age 30)
- Place of birth: Kryvyi Rih, Ukraine
- Height: 1.78 m (5 ft 10 in)
- Position: Attacking midfielder

Team information
- Current team: Türkspor Augsburg
- Number: 25

Youth career
- 2007–2009: Kryvbas-84 Kryvyi Rih
- 2009–2010: RVUFK Kyiv
- 2010–2011: Dnipro Dnipropetrovsk
- 2011–2015: Dynamo Kyiv

Senior career*
Years	Team	Apps	(Gls)
2015–2017	Hirnyk Kryvyi Rih	7	(0)
2016	→ Hirnyk-2 Kryvyi Rih (amateurs)	0	(0)
2017	Oleksandriya	0	(0)
2018–2020	Hirnyk Kryvyi Rih	48	(12)
2020–2022	Kryvbas Kryvyi Rih	26	(0)
2022–	Türkspor Augsburg	15	(1)
- * Club domestic league appearances and goals as of 13 November 2022

Ihor Olehovych Yarovoy (Ukrainian: Ігор Олегович Яровой; born 8 April 1996) is a Ukrainian professional footballer who plays as an attacking midfielder for German Bayernliga club Türkspor Augsburg.
