= Elio Capradossi =

Ugandan footballer (born 1996)

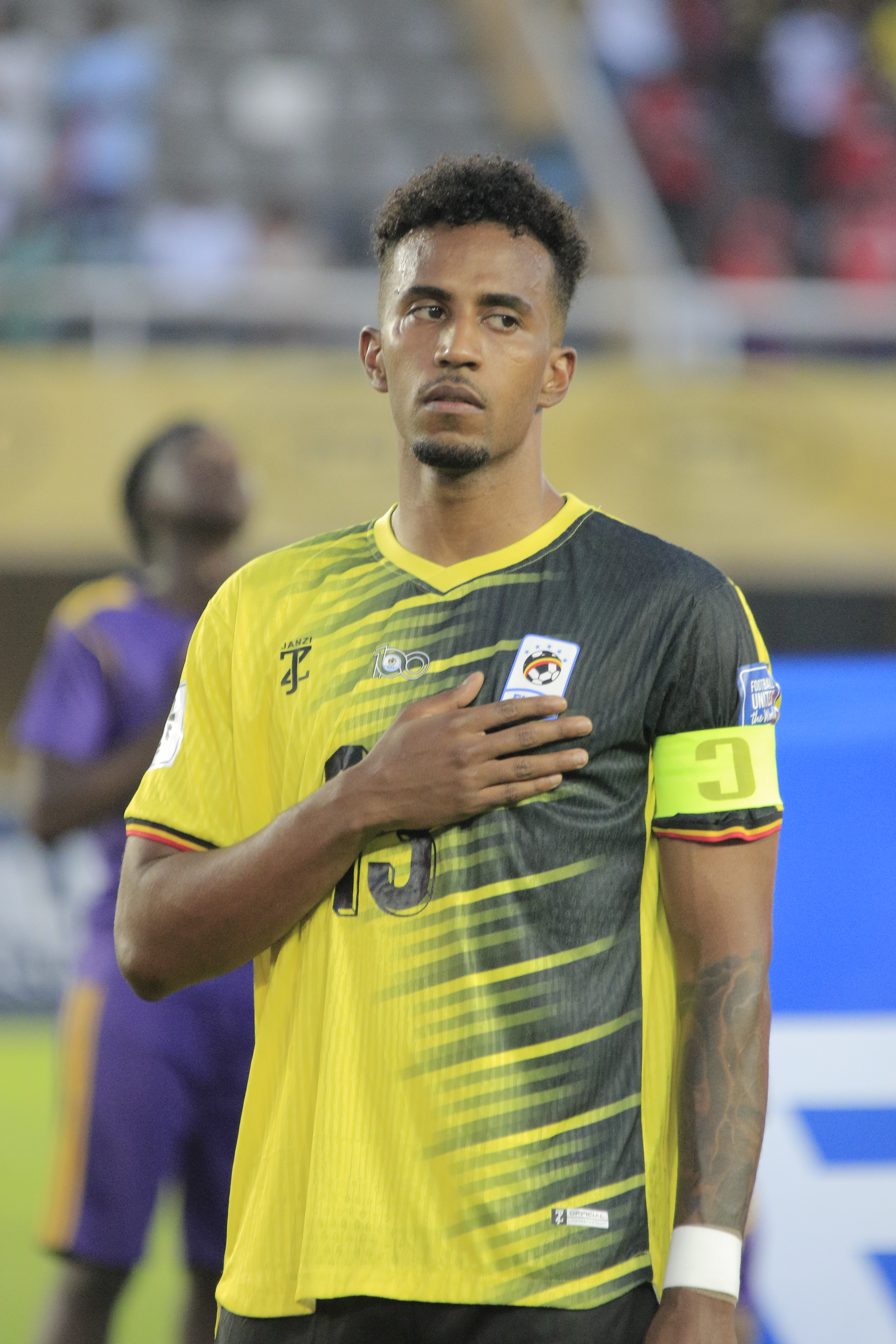
- Capradossi in 2025

Personal information
- Date of birth: 11 March 1996 (age 30)
- Place of birth: Kampala, Uganda
- Height: 1.85 m (6 ft 1 in)
- Position: Centre-back

Team information
- Current team: Universitatea Cluj
- Number: 23

Youth career
- 2002–2003: Lazio
- 2003–2010: Lodigiani
- 2010–2016: Roma

Senior career*
Years	Team	Apps	(Gls)
2016–2019	Roma	2	(0)
2016–2018	→ Bari (loan)	34	(0)
2018–2019	→ Spezia (loan)	19	(3)
2019–2022	Spezia	33	(2)
2021–2022	→ SPAL (loan)	32	(2)
2022–2024	Cagliari	16	(0)
2024	Lecco	6	(0)
2024–2025	Cittadella	16	(0)
2025–	Universitatea Cluj	18	(1)

International career^{‡}
2011–2012	Italy U16	5	(1)
2012–2013	Italy U17	26	(3)
2013–2014	Italy U18	5	(0)
2014–2015	Italy U19	8	(1)
2015–2017	Italy U20	7	(0)
2017–2018	Italy U21	4	(0)
2024–	Uganda	11	(1)
Medal record
Men's football
Representing Italy
UEFA European Under-17 Championship
Silver medal – second place	2013 Slovakia
- * Club domestic league appearances and goals as of 19 October 2026 ‡ National team caps and goals as of 14 October 2025

Elio Capradossi (born 11 March 1996) is a professional footballer who plays as a centre-back for Liga I club Universitatea Cluj. A former youth international for Italy, he plays for the Uganda national team.

== Club career ==
Capradossi is a product of Roma youth academy. He won the 2015–2016 Italian U19 Championship with Roma's U19 team as the squad captain.

In the summer 2016 he was loaned to Bari in Serie B. He made his league debut on 24 September 2016 playing as a starter in the match against Benevento at Stadio San Nicola. In January 2018, after one season and a half spent at Bari, he returned to Roma.

On 6 May 2018 he made his debut with Roma in a 1–0 away victory against Cagliari where he was played in the starting 11.

On 20 July 2018, Capradossi signed to Serie B side Spezia on loan until 30 June 2019.

On 1 August 2019, Capradossi signed to Serie B club Spezia on a four-year contract.

In August 2019 Capradossi was acquired by the Spezia Calcio and in July 2020 had a serious injury to the anterior cruciate ligament which blocked his playing activity for the subsequent ten months. On 23 May 2021, the Spezia-Roma match will sign his return in Serie A after three years.

On 1 September 2022, Capradossi signed a two-year contract with Cagliari. On 22 January 2024, his contract with Cagliari was dissolved by mutual consent.

On 2 February 2024, Capradossi joined Serie B club Lecco.

On 25 November 2024, Capradossi signed with Cittadella in Serie B.

On 2 July 2025, Capradossi signed a deal with Romanian club Universitatea Cluj.

== International career ==
He represented the Italy U17 side at the 2013 UEFA European Under-17 Championship and the 2013 FIFA U-17 World Cup.

He made his debut with the U21 team on 5 October 2017, in a friendly match won 6–2 against Hungary.

He decided to accept a call-up from Uganda in June 2024, being able to switch nationality thanks to his birthplace. He made his debut for Uganda on 7 June 2024 in a World Cup qualifier against Botswana at the Mandela National Stadium. He played the full game as Uganda won 1–0.

On December 7, 2025, he was selected by Paul Put for Uganda's squad to participate in the 2025 Africa Cup of Nations.

== Playing style ==
Capradossi has been compared to Angelo Ogbonna because of his ethnicity, strength, height and skill. He has been credited for his abilities in passing and intercepting the ball, as well as his physicality and heading skills.

== Personal life ==
Capradossi was born in Kampala, Uganda to an Italian father and a DR Congolese mother, and moved to Italy at the age of two. He received citizenship from his father who was the former director of Roma's rugby team.

== Career statistics ==
=== Club ===
As of match played 19 October 2026

Appearances and goals by club, season and competition
Club	Season	League			National cup (Note: Includes Coppa Italia, Cupa României)		Europe		Other		Total	
Club	Season	Division	Apps	Goals	Apps	Goals	Apps	Goals	Apps	Goals	Apps	Goals
Roma	2015–16	Serie A	0	0	0	0	0	0	—		15	2
Roma	2017–18	Serie A	2	0	—		0	0	—		2	0
Roma	Total		2	0	0	0	0	0	—		2	0
Bari (loan)	2016–17	Serie B	23	0	—		—		—		23	0
Bari (loan)	2017–18	Serie B	11	0	3	0	—		—		14	0
Bari (loan)	Total		34	0	3	0	—		—		37	0
Spezia (loan)	2018–19	Serie B	19	3	0	0	—		1 (Note: Appearances in Serie B promotion play-offs)	0	20	3
Spezia	2019–20	Serie B	32	2	2	0	—		0	0	34	2
Spezia	2020–21	Serie A	1	0	0	0	—		—		1	0
Spezia	2021–22	Serie A	—		0	0	—		—		0	0
Spezia	2022–23	Serie A	0	0	0	0	—		—		0	0
Spezia	Total		52	5	2	0	—		1	0	55	5
SPAL (loan)	2021–22	Serie B	32	2	—		—		—		32	0
Cagliari	2022–23	Serie B	16	0	1	0	—		0	0	17	0
Cagliari	2023–24	Serie A	0	0	0	0	—		—		0	0
Cagliari	Total		16	0	1	0	—		0	0	17	0
Lecco	2023–24	Serie B	6	0	—		—		—		6	0
Cittadella	2024–25	Serie B	16	0	—		—		—		16	0
Universitatea Cluj	2025–26	Liga I	14	1	2	0	0	0	—		16	1
Universitatea Cluj	2026–27	Liga I	4	0	0	0	0	0	0	0	4	0
Universitatea Cluj	Total		18	1	2	0	0	0	0	0	20	1
Career total			176	8	8	0	0	0	1	0	185	8

=== International ===
As of match played 14 October 2025

Appearances and goals by national team and year
National team	Year	Apps	Goals
Uganda	2024	4	0
Uganda	2025	7	1
Total		11	1

As of match played 5 September 2025. Uganda score listed first, score column indicates score after each Capradossi goal.

List of international goals scored by Elio Capradossi
No.	Date	Venue	Opponent	Score	Result	Competition
1	5 September 2025	Mandela National Stadium, Kampala, Uganda	Mozambique	4–0	4–0	2026 FIFA World Cup qualification

== Honours ==
Universitatea Cluj

- Cupa României runner-up: 2025–26
- Supercupa României runner-up: 2026

Italy U17

- UEFA European Under-17 Championship runner-up: 2013
