= Tobias Pellegrini =

Austrian footballer

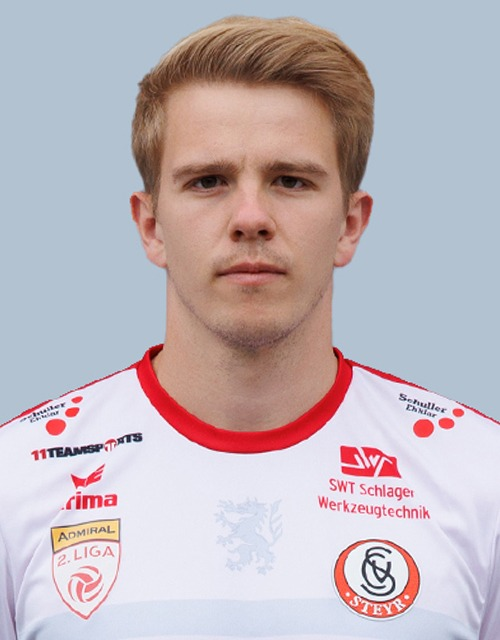

Personal information
- Date of birth: 3 April 1996 (age 30)
- Place of birth: Linz, Austria
- Height: 1.80 m (5 ft 11 in)
- Position: Forward

Team information
- Current team: Austria Salzburg
- Number: 9

Youth career
- ASKÖ Blaue Elf Linz
- –2014: Fußballakademie Linz

Senior career*
Years	Team	Apps	(Gls)
2014–2019	FC Pasching/LASK Juniors	45	(26)
2014–2018	LASK Linz	12	(1)
2016–2018	→ Blau-Weiß Linz (loan)	31	(9)
2018–2019	Hertha Wels	27	(1)
2019–2022	Wels	52	(14)
2022–2023	SK Vorwärts Steyr	26	(7)
2023–2024	SKU Amstetten	13	(0)
2024	SPG Pregarten	15	(9)
2024–2025	Bischofshofen	28	(15)
2025–	Austria Salzburg	11	(0)

International career
2011	Austria U16	3	(1)
2012–2013	Austria U17	23	(4)
2014	Austria U18	1	(0)
2014–2015	Austria U19	4	(0)
- * Club domestic league appearances and goals as of 17 May 2026

Tobias Pellegrini (born 3 April 1996) is an Austrian footballer who plays for Austria Salzburg.

== Career ==
=== FC Wels ===
Ahead of the 2019/20 season, Pellegrini joined FC Wels in the Austrian Regionalliga.
