= Sergei Makarov (footballer) =

Russian footballer

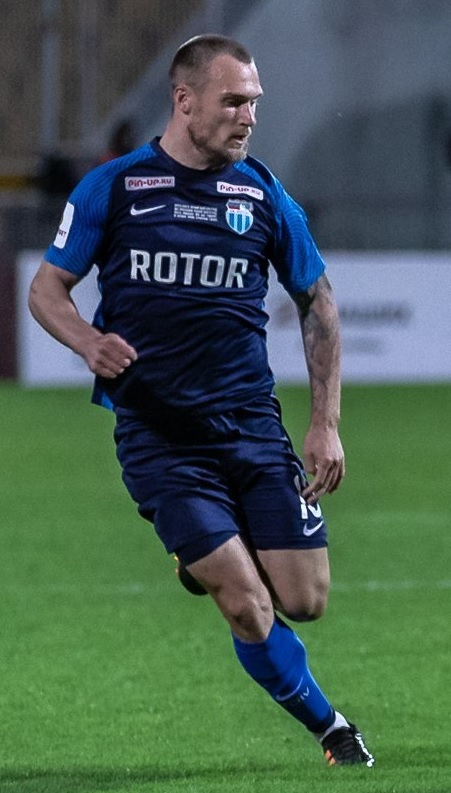
- Makarov with Rotor Volgograd in 2022

Personal information
- Full name: Sergei Vasilyevich Makarov
- Date of birth: 3 October 1996 (age 30)
- Place of birth: Nekrasovka, Khabarovsk Krai, Russia
- Height: 1.73 m (5 ft 8 in)
- Position: Defensive midfielder

Team information
- Current team: Chelyabinsk
- Number: 6

Youth career
- Kolovrat Nekrasovka
- –2009: SKA-Energiya Khabarovsk
- 2009–2012: Lokomotiv Moscow

Senior career*
| Years | Team | Apps | (Gls) |
| 2013–2016 | Lokomotiv Moscow | 0 | (0) |
| 2016 | → Minsk (loan) | 30 | (2) |
| 2017 | Minsk | 13 | (0) |
| 2017–2018 | Anorthosis | 0 | (0) |
| 2018 | SKA-Khabarovsk | 3 | (0) |
| 2019 | Isloch Minsk Raion | 28 | (1) |
| 2020–2022 | Rotor Volgograd | 64 | (0) |
| 2022–2024 | Akron Tolyatti | 64 | (1) |
| 2024–2025 | Alania Vladikavkaz | 17 | (0) |
| 2025–2026 | Rotor Volgograd | 47 | (3) |
| 2026– | Chelyabinsk | 0 | (0) |

International career
| 2011 | Russia U15 | 1 | (0) |
| 2011–2012 | Russia U16 | 13 | (2) |
| 2012–2013 | Russia U17 | 19 | (0) |
| 2014–2015 | Russia U19 | 11 | (1) |
| 2014–2016 | Russia U21 | 15 | (0) |
- * Club domestic league appearances and goals as of 16 May 2026

Sergei Vasilyevich Makarov (Russian: Сергей Васильевич Макаров; born 3 October 1996) is a Russian footballer who plays as a defensive midfielder for Chelyabinsk.

== Club career ==
During 2016–2017 he played for Minsk. In the summer of 2017 he moved to the Cypriot club Anorthosis, but only played for their Under-21 team, making no appearances for the senior squad. On 14 January 2018 he signed a 1-year contract with SKA-Khabarovsk.

== International ==
He won the 2013 UEFA European Under-17 Championship with the Russia national under-17 football team, with which he also participated in the 2013 FIFA U-17 World Cup. He also participated in the 2015 UEFA European Under-19 Championship, in which Russia national under-19 football team was the runner-up.

== Career statistics ==
As of 4 March 2018

| Club | Season | League | | | Cup | | Continental | | Total | |
| Club | Season | Division | Apps | Goals | Apps | Goals | Apps | Goals | Apps | Goals |
|---|---|---|---|---|---|---|---|---|---|---|
| Lokomotiv Moscow | 2012–13 | Russian Premier League | 0 | 0 | 0 | 0 | – | | 0 | 0 |
| Lokomotiv Moscow | 2013–14 | Russian Premier League | 0 | 0 | 0 | 0 | – | | 0 | 0 |
| Lokomotiv Moscow | 2014–15 | Russian Premier League | 0 | 0 | 0 | 0 | 0 | 0 | 0 | 0 |
| Lokomotiv Moscow | 2015–16 | Russian Premier League | 0 | 0 | 0 | 0 | 0 | 0 | 0 | 0 |
| Lokomotiv Moscow | Total | | 0 | 0 | 0 | 0 | 0 | 0 | 0 | 0 |
| Minsk | 2016 | Belarusian Premier League | 30 | 2 | 4 | 0 | – | | 34 | 2 |
| Minsk | 2017 | Belarusian Premier League | 13 | 0 | 2 | 0 | – | | 15 | 0 |
| Minsk | Total | | 43 | 2 | 6 | 0 | 0 | 0 | 49 | 2 |
| Anorthosis Famagusta | 2017–18 | Cypriot First Division | 0 | 0 | 0 | 0 | – | | 0 | 0 |
| SKA-Khabarovsk | 2017–18 | Russian Premier League | 0 | 0 | 0 | 0 | – | | 0 | 0 |
| Career total | | | 43 | 2 | 6 | 0 | 0 | 0 | 49 | 2 |
