= Atila Varga =

Association football player

Personal information
- Date of birth: 11 April 1996 (age 30)
- Place of birth: Trebišov, Slovakia
- Height: 1.88 m (6 ft 2 in)
- Position: Defender

Team information
- Current team: TJ Vyšné Remety

Youth career
- MFK Veľké Kapušany
- –2012: Michalovce
- 2012–2015: Juventus
- 2015–2016: Sampdoria

Senior career*
| Years | Team | Apps | (Gls) |
| 2016–2018 | Sampdoria | 0 | (0) |
| 2016–2017 | → Latina (loan) | 0 | (0) |
| 2017–2018 | → Arezzo (loan) | 28 | (1) |
| 2018–2019 | Carrarese | 5 | (0) |
| 2019–2020 | Siena | 9 | (0) |
| 2020–2021 | Carpi | 1 | (0) |
| 2021 | Pistoiese | 14 | (0) |
| 2021–2022 | Sambenedettese | 10 | (0) |
| 2023– | TJ Vyšné Remety | | |

International career
| 2011 | Slovakia U-16 | 1 | (0) |
| 2012–2013 | Slovakia U-17 | 10 | (1) |
| 2014 | Slovakia U-19 | 2 | (0) |
| 2018 | Slovakia U-21 | 1 | (0) |
- * Club domestic league appearances and goals as of 22 May 2022

Atila Varga (born 11 April 1996) is a Slovak football player. He plays in Slovakia for TJ Vyšné Remety.

== Club career ==
He made his Serie C debut for Arezzo on 27 August 2017 in a game against Arzachena.

On 31 January 2019, he joined Siena on a 1.5-year contract.

On 7 January 2020, he signed with Carpi.

On 11 January 2021, he moved to Pistoiese.

On 24 September 2021, he joined Sambenedettese in Serie D.
