= Oxie IF =

Swedish football club

- Full name: Oxie Idrottsförening
- Founded: 1946
- Dissolved: 2012
- Ground: Oxie IP; Oxie; Sweden
- League: Division 4 Skåne Sydvästra
Home colours

Oxie IF was a Swedish football club located in Oxie, Malmö Municipality.

== Background ==
The club was affiliated to Skånes Fotbollförbund and made 8 appearances in the Svenska Cupen. On December 10, 2012, the club merged with BK Vången to form the new club Oxie SK.

== Season to season ==
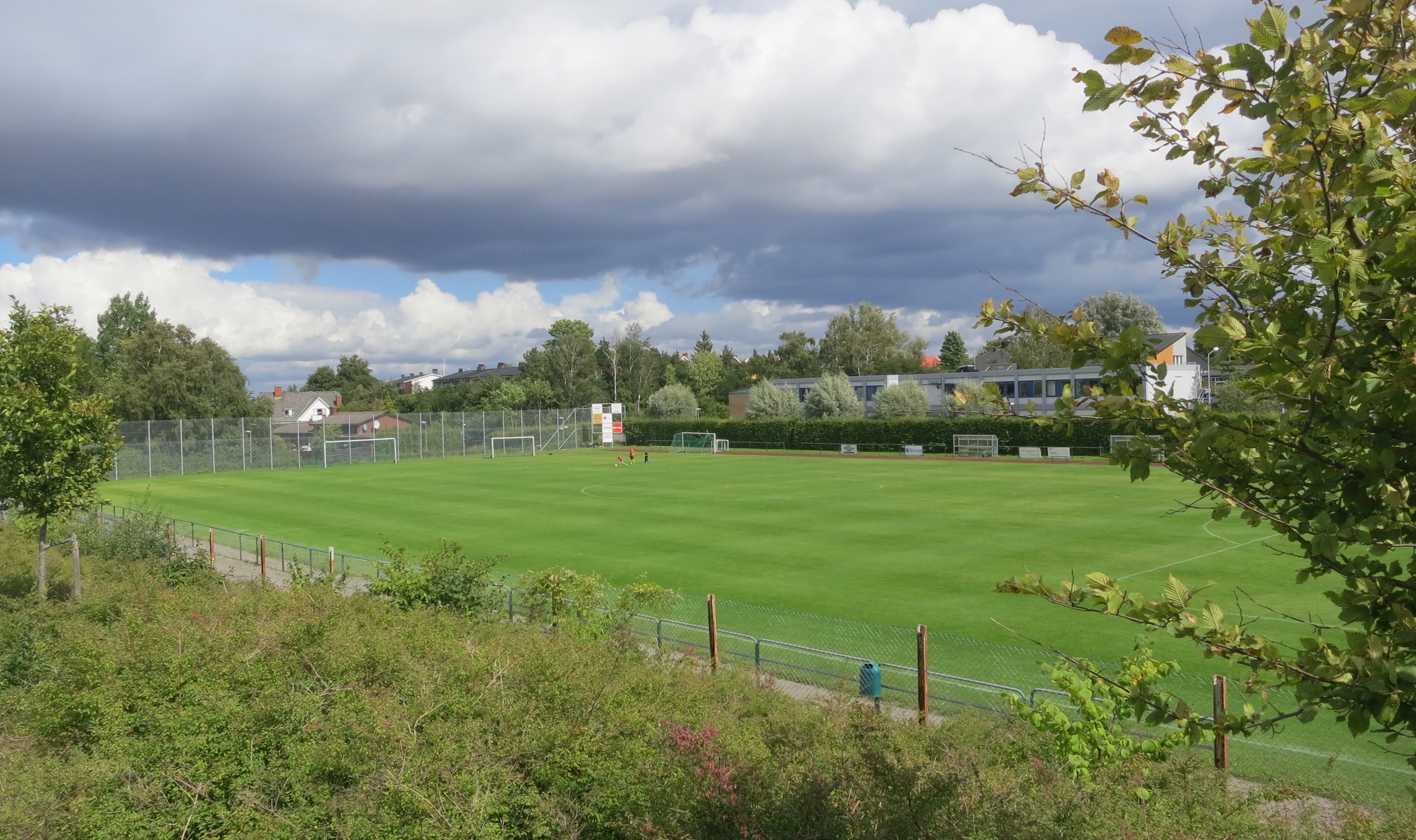
Home ground of Oxie IF.

Season	Level	Division	Section	Position	Movements
1999	Tier 5	Division 4	Skåne Södra	1st	Promoted
2000	Tier 4	Division 3	Södra Götaland	7th	
2001	Tier 4	Division 3	Södra Götaland	7th	
2002	Tier 4	Division 3	Södra Götaland	12th	Relegated
2003	Tier 5	Division 4	Skåne Södra	10th	Relegation Playoffs
2004	Tier 5	Division 4	Skåne Södra	11th	Relegated
2005	Tier 6	Division 5	Skåne Sydvästra	2nd	Promotion Playoffs – Promoted
2006*	Tier 6	Division 4	Skåne Sydvästra	5th	
2007	Tier 6	Division 4	Skåne Södra	6th	
2008	Tier 6	Division 4	Skåne Södra	4th	
2009	Tier 6	Division 4	Skåne Södra	2nd	Promotion Playoffs
2010	Tier 6	Division 4	Skåne Sydvästra	8th	
2011	Tier 6	Division 4	Skåne Sydvästra	5th	
2012	Tier 6	Division 4	Skåne Sydvästra		

* League restructuring in 2006 resulted in a new division being created at Tier 3 and subsequent divisions dropping a level.
