= Nikola Zivotic =

Austrian footballer (born 1996)

Nikola Zivotić
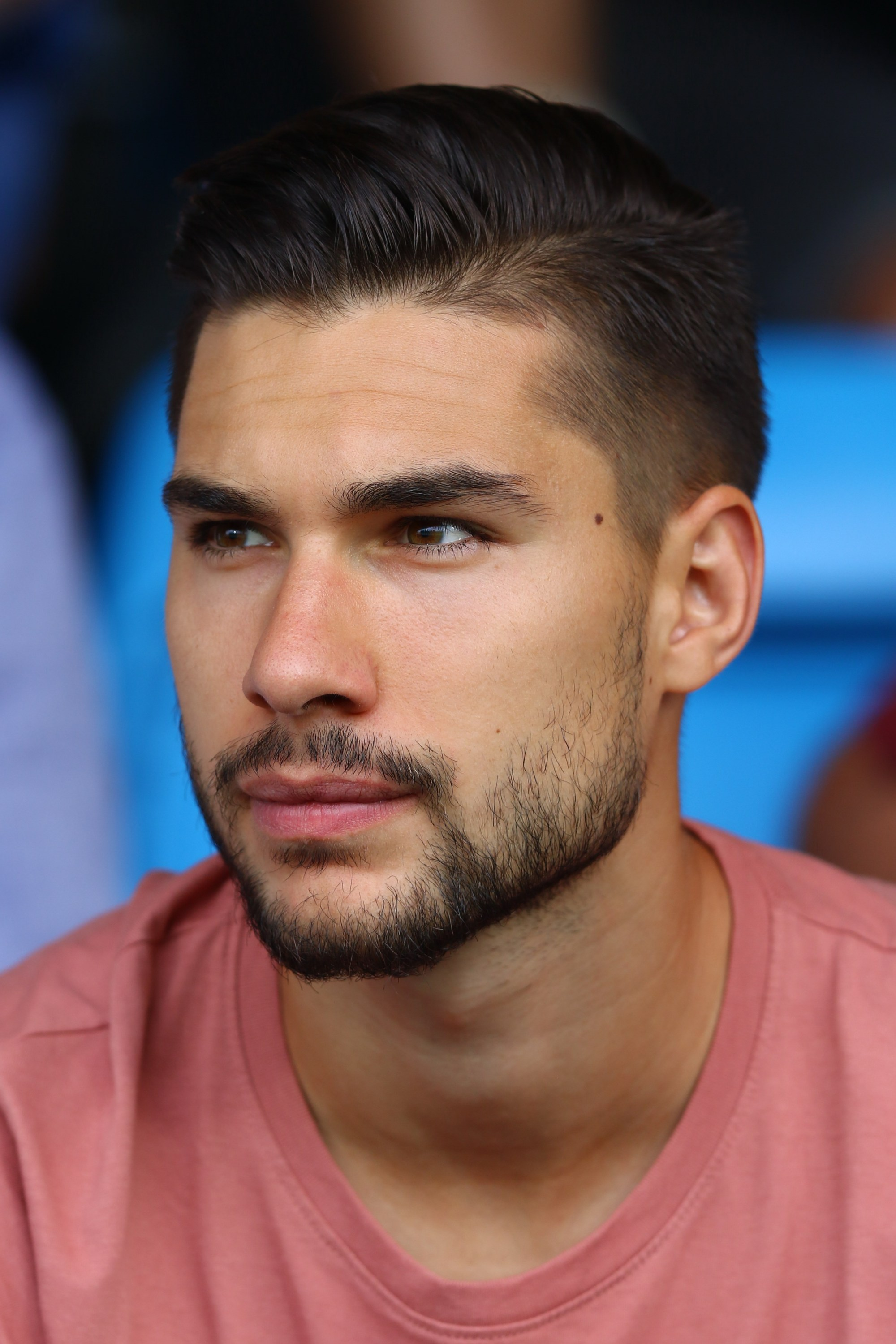

Personal information
- Full name: Nikola Zivotic
- Date of birth: 26 January 1996 (age 30)
- Place of birth: Vienna, Austria
- Height: 1.84 m (6 ft 1/2 in)
- Position: Left winger

Team information
- Current team: SV Lafnitz

Senior career*
Years	Team	Apps	(Gls)
2012–2016	Austria Wien II	53	(6)
2016–2018	SC Rheindorf Altach	20	(2)
2017–2018	→ Wiener Neustadt (loan)	18	(0)
2018–	SV Lafnitz	0	(0)

International career
2012–2013	Austria U-17	17	(5)
2014	Austria U-18	2	(0)
2014	Austria U-19	3	(0)
- * Club domestic league appearances and goals as of 16 July 2018

Nikola Zivotić (born 26 January 1996) is an Austrian footballer who plays as a left winger for SV Lafnitz.
