= Martin Slaninka =

Slovak footballer

Personal information
- Full name: Martin Slaninka
- Date of birth: 26 March 1996 (age 30)
- Place of birth: Žilina, Slovakia
- Position: Left-back

Team information
- Current team: Tatran Liptovský Mikuláš
- Number: 4

Youth career
- –2014: Žilina

Senior career*
Years	Team	Apps	(Gls)
2014−2015	Žilina B	9	(0)
2015−2018	Frýdek-Místek	64	(5)
2018−2019	Prostějov	27	(1)
2019−2021	iClinic Sereď	44	(1)
2021−2022	Dukla Banská Bystrica	25	(0)
2023	Třinec	15	(3)
2024	Považská Bystrica	11	(1)
2024−	Tatran Liptovský Mikuláš	25	(1)

International career^{‡}
2013	Slovakia U17	6	(2)
- * Club domestic league appearances and goals as of 25 May 2026 ‡ National team caps and goals as of 29 October 2013

Martin Slaninka (born 26 March 1996) is a Slovak professional footballer who plays for Tatran Liptovský Mikuláš as a left-back.

== Club career ==
Slaninka made his Fortuna Liga debut for Sereď against Spartak Trnava on 21 July 2019, playing 90 minutes of the 2–0 loss and being booked with a yellow card in the second half.
