= Aleksandr Likhachyov =

Russian footballer (born 1996)

Personal information
- Full name: Aleksandr Sergeyevich Likhachyov
- Date of birth: 22 July 1996 (age 30)
- Place of birth: Izhevsk, Russia
- Height: 1.84 m (6 ft 0 in)
- Position: Defender

Youth career
- 2013–2018: FC Spartak Moscow

Senior career*
Years	Team	Apps	(Gls)
2016–2018	FC Spartak-2 Moscow	55	(0)
2019	FC Tyumen	12	(1)
2019	FC Fakel Voronezh	16	(0)
2020–2022	FC Zvezda Perm	53	(1)
2022–2023	FC Spartak Kostroma	23	(1)
2023–2024	FC Tekstilshchik Ivanovo	42	(0)

International career^{‡}
2011–2012	Russia U16	10	(0)
2013	Russia U17	9	(0)
2015	Russia U19	3	(0)
2016–2018	Russia U21	10	(0)
- * Club domestic league appearances and goals as of 17 November 2024 ‡ National team caps and goals as of 7 September 2018

Aleksandr Sergeyevich Likhachyov (Russian: Александр Сергеевич Лихачёв; born 22 July 1996) is a Russian football player.

== Club career ==
He made his debut in the Russian Football National League for FC Spartak-2 Moscow on 10 September 2016 in a game against FC Volgar Astrakhan.

On 20 February 2019, his Spartak Moscow contract was dissolved by mutual consent.

== International ==
He won the 2013 UEFA European Under-17 Championship with the Russia national under-17 football team, he also participated with it in the 2013 FIFA U-17 World Cup. He was the runner-up of the 2015 UEFA European Under-19 Championship with the Russia national under-19 football team.
