= Mario Pugliese =

Italian footballer (born 1996)

Personal information
- Date of birth: 26 March 1996 (age 30)
- Place of birth: San Giorgio a Cremano, Italy
- Height: 1.74 m (5 ft 8 1/2 in)
- Position: Midfielder

Team information
- Current team: Arona

Youth career
- 2011–2013: Atalanta

Senior career*
Years	Team	Apps	(Gls)
2013–2019	Atalanta	0	(0)
2015	→ Carpi (loan)	2	(0)
2015–2016	→ Arezzo (loan)	15	(0)
2016–2017	→ Pro Piacenza (loan)	29	(3)
2017–2018	→ Pro Vercelli (loan)	7	(0)
2018–2019	→ Carrarese (loan)	14	(0)
2019	→ Cavese (loan)	6	(2)
2019–2021	Vibonese	42	(4)
2021	Novara	4	(0)
2021–2022	Casale	9	(1)
2022–	Arona	0	(0)

International career
2011–2012	Italy U16	12	(0)
2012–2013	Italy U17	25	(2)
2013–2014	Italy U18	6	(3)
2014–2015	Italy U19	12	(0)
- * Club domestic league appearances and goals as of 4 September 2022

Mario Pugliese (born 26 March 1996) is an Italian footballer who plays as a central midfielder or right winger for the six-tier Promozione club Arona.

== Club career ==
Born in San Giorgio a Cremano, Pugliese began his career on Atalanta's youth categories, and was promoted to main squad for 2013–14 season, receiving the no. 96 jersey.

On 4 December 2013 Pugliese made his professional debut, starting in a 2-0 home win over Sassuolo, for the campaign's Coppa Italia.

On 29 January 2015 Pugliese was loaned out to Serie B side Carpi, where he would make 2 appearances for the Biancorossi in their title winning season.

On 25 August 2015 Pugliese was loaned out to Lega Pro side Arezzo.

On 5 August 2016 Atalanta loaned out Pugliese to Pro Piacenza to play in the 2016-17 Lega Pro.

On 6 July 2017 Pugliese was loaned out to Serie B side Pro Vercelli.

On 31 January 2019 he joined Cavese on loan.

On 6 August 2019 he signed a 1-year contract with Vibonese.

== International career ==
With the U-17 Italian national he played the European Championship where Italy placed 2nd, he also play the world cup u-17 in UAE.
