= Christer Lipovac =

Swedish footballer of Croatian descent (born 1996)

Personal information
- Full name: Christer Lipovac
- Date of birth: 7 March 1996 (age 30)
- Place of birth: Sweden
- Height: 1.80 m (5 ft 11 in)
- Position: Forward

Team information
- Current team: Karlslunds IF
- Number: 10

Youth career
- 2002–2011: Karlslunds IF

Senior career*
Years	Team	Apps	(Gls)
2012	Karlslunds IF	19	(2)
2013–2015	Örebro SK	3	(0)
2013	→ Karlslunds IF (loan)	16	(9)
2015	→ Karlslunds IF (loan)		
2016–	Karlslunds IF		

International career^{‡}
2012–2013	Sweden U17	21	(6)
2013–2014	Sweden U19	6	(0)
- * Club domestic league appearances and goals as of 30 November 2017 ‡ National team caps and goals as of 8 September 2014

Christer Lipovac (born 7 March 1996) is a Swedish footballer who plays for Karlslunds IF as a forward.

== Career ==
Lipovac signed his first professional deal at age 16 when his boyhood club Karlslunds IF gave him a first team contract in 2012. The following year he was bought by Örebro SK who loaned him back to Karlslund for the 2013 season so that he could get playtime at the fourth tier level. On 4 May 2014 he made his Allsvenskan debut when he came on as a second-half substitute in an away game against Kalmar FF.

== International career ==
In September 2013 Lipovac was selected to the Sweden men's national under-17 football team that would compete in the 2013 FIFA U-17 World Cup.

== Honours ==
Sweden U17

- FIFA U-17 World Cup Third place: 2013
