= Jakob Bergman =

Swedish footballer

Personal information
- Date of birth: 2 January 1996 (age 30)
- Place of birth: Uppsala, Sweden
- Height: 1.83 m (6 ft 0 in)
- Position: Defender

Team information
- Current team: Umeå FC

Youth career
- –2012: IK Sirius
- 2014–2015: IFK Göteborg

Senior career*
Years	Team	Apps	(Gls)
2012–2013	IK Sirius	1	(0)
2016–2017	IK Sirius	22	(1)
2017	→ Nyköpings BIS (loan)	6	(0)
2018–2019	Varbergs BoIS	25	(0)
2019	→ Nyköpings BIS (loan)	27	(1)
2020–	Umeå FC	15	(0)

International career
2011	Sweden U15	4	(0)
2012	Sweden U16	7	(0)
2012–2013	Sweden U17	8	(0)
2016	Sweden U19	1	(0)
- * Club domestic league appearances and goals as of 21 April 2021

Jakob Bergman (born 2 January 1996) is a Swedish football defender who plays for Umeå FC. He has been capped as a Sweden youth international.
