= Robin Kamber =

Swiss footballer (born 1995)

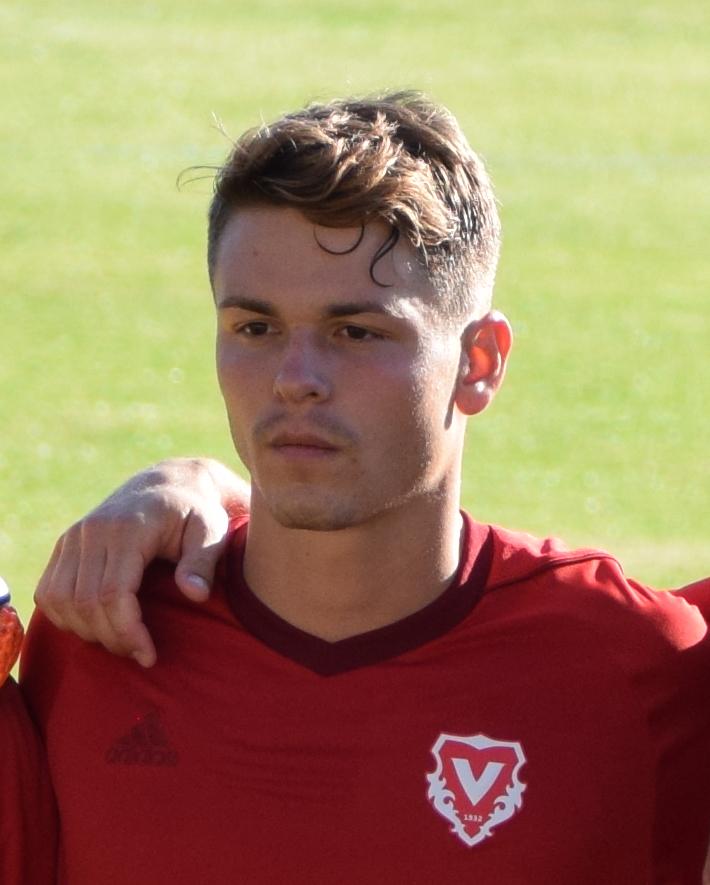
- Kamber with Vaduz in 2017

Personal information
- Date of birth: 15 February 1995 (age 31)
- Place of birth: Basel, Switzerland
- Height: 1.87 m (6 ft 2 in)
- Position: Midfielder

Team information
- Current team: Basel II
- Number: 4

Youth career
- 2012: Basel
- 2012: Red Bull Salzburg
- 2012–2013: Basel

Senior career*
Years	Team	Apps	(Gls)
2013–2015	Basel	0	(0)
2014–2015	→ Servette (loan)	14	(3)
2015–2018	Vaduz	32	(0)
2016–2017	→ FC Winterthur (loan)	27	(5)
2018–2020	Grasshoppers	17	(0)
2020	Slaven Belupo	4	(0)
2020	Schönenwerd II	1	(0)
2020–2022	Wil	44	(4)
2022	Lausanne-Ouchy	14	(3)
2022–2023	Górnik Zabrze	4	(0)
2022	Górnik Zabrze II	2	(0)
2023–2024	Schaffhausen	33	(4)
2024	Étoile Carouge	9	(1)
2025	YF Juventus	1	(0)
2025–2026	VfR Kleinhüningen		
2026	BSC Old Boys		
2026–	Basel II	8	(0)

International career
2011	Switzerland U15	4	(1)
2011–2012	Switzerland U16	7	(3)
2012–2013	Switzerland U17	6	(2)
2013–2014	Switzerland U18	4	(1)
2014–2015	Switzerland U19	8	(1)
2015–2016	Switzerland U20	2	(0)
- * Club domestic league appearances and goals as of 1 October 2026

Robin Kamber (born 15 February 1995) is a Swiss professional footballer who plays as a midfielder for Swiss Promotion League club Basel II.

== Club career ==
Kamber spent his youth career at Basel and for a short time at Red Bull Salzburg. Kamber was a part of Basel's 2013–14 UEFA Youth League campaign, where he scored against Chelsea in a home match. In February 2015, he moved from Basel U21s to Servette and there, on 4 March 2015, he made his debut for the first team in the away game against Lausanne-Sport. He came on in the 64th minute for Alexandre Pasche. He scored his first goal for Servette in the 1–0 away win over Biel-Bienne, when he scored the winning goal shortly before the final whistle. At the end of the season, he came to a total of 14 appearances and three goals.

After his loan at Servette ended on 30 June 2015, Kamber joined Vaduz, signing a contract for three years until 30 June 2018. He made his debut on matchday 4 against FC Sion, where he came on as a substitute for Markus Neumayr. On 4 May 2016, he and his team won the Liechtenstein Football Cup, following a 11–0 final victory against Schaan. For the 2016–17 season, Kamber moved on loan to Winterthur in the Challenge League.

On 11 January 2022, Kamber signed with Lausanne-Ouchy.

On 16 August 2022, Kamber moved to Poland to join Ekstraklasa side Górnik Zabrze on a two-year contract with an extension option. He left the club by mutual consent on 25 March 2023.

On 1 July 2023, Kamber signed with Schaffhausen on a free transfer.

== Honours ==
Vaduz

- Liechtenstein Football Cup: 2015–16, 2017–18
