= Ali Suljić =

Swedish-Bosnian footballer

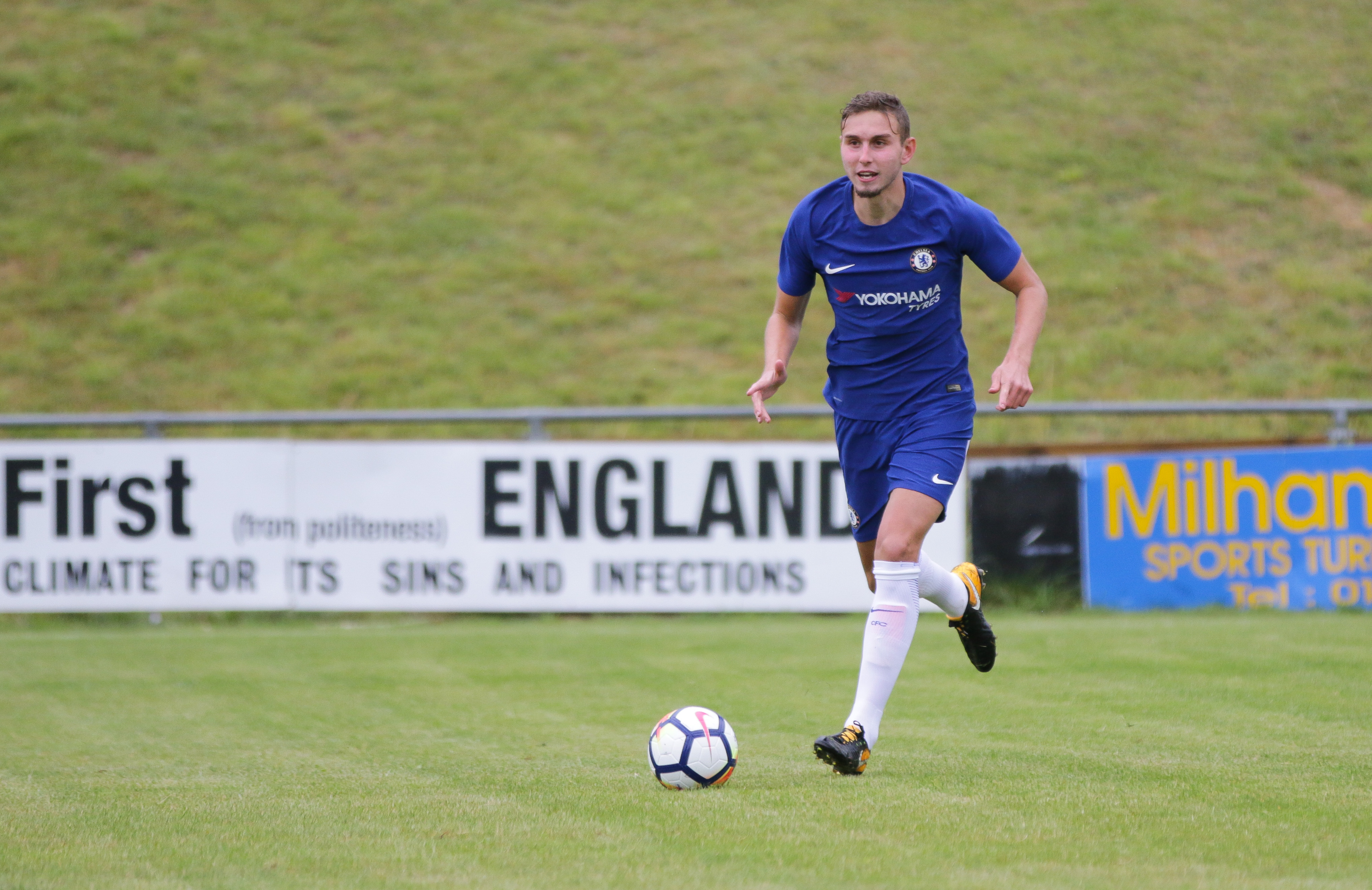
- Ali Suljić in 2017.

Personal information
- Date of birth: 18 September 1997 (age 29)
- Place of birth: Motala, Sweden
- Height: 1.89 m (6 ft 2 in)
- Position: Defender

Team information
- Current team: Egersund
- Number: 4

Youth career
- Motala
- 2013–2018: Chelsea

Senior career*
Years	Team	Apps	(Gls)
2012–2013	Motala	7	(0)
2018–2019	Häcken	0	(0)
2019–2022	Brommapojkarna	82	(8)
2022	Helsingborg	11	(0)
2023	AFC Eskilstuna	29	(0)
2024–2026	Östersund	58	(4)
2026–	Egersund	5	(0)

International career^{‡}
2013	Sweden U17	8	(2)
2014–2016	Sweden U19	8	(1)
- * Club domestic league appearances and goals as of 14 November 2026 ‡ National team caps and goals as of 14 August 2022

Ali Suljić (born 18 September 1997) is a Swedish professional footballer who plays as a defender for Norwegian club Egersund.

== Club career ==
Born in Motala, Suljić started his career with local side Motala AIF before joining English side Chelsea in 2013.

Following his release by Chelsea, he returned to Sweden, eventually signing with Allsvenskan side Helsingborg ahead of the 2022 season.

On 19 December 2023, Suljić signed a three-year contract with Östersund, beginning in 2024.

== International career ==
Suljić has represented Sweden at youth international level. He remains eligible to represent Bosnia and Herzegovina.

== Career statistics ==
=== Club ===
As of 14 November 2026

Club	Season	League			Cup		Other		Total	
Club	Season	Division	Apps	Goals	Apps	Goals	Apps	Goals	Apps	Goals
Motala	2012	Division 2	3	0	0	0	0	0	3	0
Motala	2013	Division 2	4	0	0	0	0	0	4	0
Motala	Total		7	0	0	0	0	0	7	0
Häcken	2018	Allsvenskan	0	0	1 (Note: Appearances in the Svenska Cupen)	0	0	0	1	0
Brommapojkarna	2019	Superettan	25	0	3	0	0	0	28	0
Brommapojkarna	2020	Ettan	28	6	3	0	2 (Note: Appearances in the Superettan playoffs)	0	33	6
Brommapojkarna	2021	Ettan	29	2	1	0	0	0	30	2
Brommapojkarna	Total		82	8	7	0	2	0	91	8
Helsingborg	2022	Allsvenskan	11	0	4	1	0	0	15	1
AFC Eskilstuna	2023	Superettan	29	0	0	0	0	0	29	0
Östersund	2024	Superettan	28	4	3	0	2 (Note: Superettan relegation playoff games)	0	33	4
Östersund	2025	Superettan	26	0	0	0	0	0	26	0
Östersund	2026	Superettan	4	0	3	0	0	0	7	0
Östersund	Total		58	4	6	0	2	0	66	4
Ranheim	2026	Norwegian First Division	5	0	1	0	0	0	6	0
Career total			192	12	19	1	4	0	215	13
