= Anton Mitryushkin =

Russian footballer

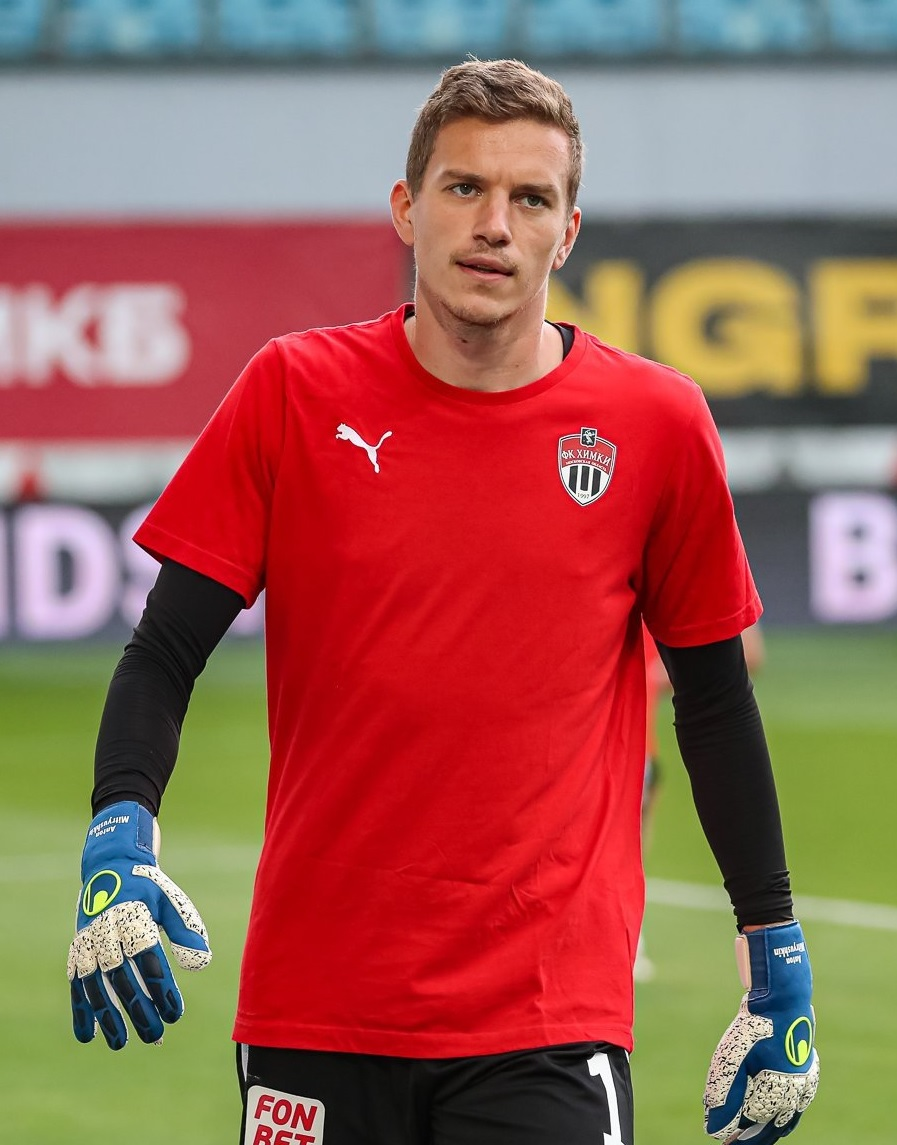
- Mitryushkin with Khimki in 2022

Personal information
- Full name: Anton Vladimirovich Mitryushkin
- Date of birth: 8 February 1996 (age 30)
- Place of birth: Krasnoyarsk, Russia
- Height: 1.89 m (6 ft 2 in)
- Position: Goalkeeper

Team information
- Current team: Lokomotiv Moscow
- Number: 1

Youth career
- 2003–2007: SKA Rostov-on-Don
- 2008–2009: FC Rostov
- 2010–2013: Spartak Moscow

Senior career*
Years	Team	Apps	(Gls)
2013–2016	Spartak-2 Moscow	10	(0)
2013–2016	Spartak Moscow	3	(0)
2016–2020	Sion	66	(0)
2016–2019	Sion U21	15	(0)
2020–2021	Fortuna Düsseldorf	0	(0)
2020–2021	Fortuna Düsseldorf II	9	(0)
2021–2022	Dynamo Dresden	5	(0)
2022–2024	Khimki	20	(0)
2022–2023	Khimki-M	1	(0)
2024–	Lokomotiv Moscow	50	(0)

International career^{‡}
2011–2013	Russia U16	16	(0)
2012–2013	Russia U17	21	(0)
2014–2015	Russia U19	9	(0)
2014–2017	Russia U21	14	(0)
2026–	Russia	3	(0)
- * Club domestic league appearances and goals as of 22 November 2026 ‡ National team caps and goals as of 3 October 2026

Anton Vladimirovich Mitryushkin (Russian: Антон Владимирович Митрюшкин; born 8 February 1996) is a Russian professional footballer who plays as a goalkeeper for Lokomotiv Moscow and Russia national team.

== Club career ==
Mitryushkin made his debut in the Russian Premier League on 8 March 2014, for FC Spartak Moscow in a game against FC Terek Grozny.

On 1 February 2016, Mitryushkin signed a contract with the Swiss club FC Sion until July 2019. Mitryushkin left Sion as a free agent after his contract expired on 30 June 2020. Following his release, Mitryushkin joined AS Monaco on trial, before joining Fortuna Düsseldorf on 27 October 2020. He left Fortuna upon the expiration of his contract on 24 May 2021, without making any appearances for the first team.

On 28 June 2021, he signed a one-season contract with Dynamo Dresden.

On 7 July 2022, Mitryushkin signed a two-season contract with FC Khimki.

On 1 June 2024, Mitryushkin joined Russian Premier League club Lokomotiv Moscow on a three-year contract. On 2 April 2026, he extended his contract with Lokomotiv to 2030.

== International career ==
He won the 2013 UEFA European Under-17 Football Championship with Russia, and he was awarded the Golden Player Award as the most valuable player of the tournament. He also participated in the 2013 FIFA U-17 World Cup.

Later he represented Russia U19 national team at the 2015 UEFA European Under-19 Championship, where Russia made it to the final.

Mitryushkin was called up to the senior Russia national team for the first time in June 2025 for friendlies against Nigeria and Belarus. He made his debut on 27 March 2026 in a friendly against Nicaragua.

== Honours ==
Russia

- UEFA European Under-17 Championship: 2013
- UEFA European Under-19 Championship: 2015 Runner-up

Individual

- UEFA European Under-17 Championship: Golden Player 2013
- UEFA European Under-19 Championship: 2015 team of the tournament

== Career statistics ==
=== Club ===
As of 22 November 2026

Club	Season	League			Cup		Continental		Total	
Club	Season	Division	Apps	Goals	Apps	Goals	Apps	Goals	Apps	Goals
Spartak Moscow	2012–13	Russian Premier League	0	0	0	0	0	0	0	0
Spartak Moscow	2013–14	Russian Premier League	2	0	1	0	0	0	3	0
Spartak Moscow	2014–15	Russian Premier League	1	0	0	0	—		1	0
Spartak Moscow	2015–16	Russian Premier League	0	0	0	0	—		0	0
Spartak Moscow	Total		3	0	1	0	—		4	0
Spartak-2 Moscow	2013–14	Russian Second League	5	0	—		—		5	0
Spartak-2 Moscow	2014–15	Russian Second League	1	0	—		—		1	0
Spartak-2 Moscow	2015–16	Russian First League	4	0	—		—		4	0
Spartak-2 Moscow	Total		10	0	—		—		10	0
Sion	2015–16	Swiss Super League	7	0	0	0	0	0	7	0
Sion	2016–17	Swiss Super League	35	0	5	0	—		40	0
Sion	2017–18	Swiss Super League	16	0	1	0	2 (Note: Appearances in the UEFA Europa League)	0	19	0
Sion	2019–20	Swiss Super League	8	0	1	0	—		9	0
Sion	Total		66	0	7	0	1	0	75	0
Sion U21	2015–16	Swiss Promotion League	7	0	—		—		7	0
Sion U21	2018–19	Swiss Promotion League	2	0	—		—		2	0
Sion U21	2019–20	Swiss Promotion League	6	0	—		—		6	0
Sion U21	Total		15	0	—		—		15	0
Fortuna Düsseldorf	2020–21	2. Bundesliga	0	0	0	0	—		0	0
Fortuna Düsseldorf II	2020–21	Regionalliga West	9	0	—		—		9	0
Dynamo Dresden	2021–22	2. Bundesliga	5	0	0	0	—		5	0
Khimki	2022–23	Russian Premier League	9	0	3	0	—		12	0
Khimki	2023–24	Russian First League	11	0	3	0	—		14	0
Khimki	Total		20	0	6	0	—		26	0
Khimki-M	2022–23	Russian Second League	1	0	—		—		1	0
Lokomotiv Moscow	2024–25	Russian Premier League	8	0	10	0	—		18	0
Lokomotiv Moscow	2025–26	Russian Premier League	29	0	1	0	—		30	0
Lokomotiv Moscow	2026–27	Russian Premier League	13	0	1	0	—		14	0
Lokomotiv Moscow	Total		50	0	12	0	0	0	62	0
Career total			179	0	26	0	2	0	207	0

=== International ===
As of match played 3 October 2026

Appearances and goals by national team and year
National team	Year	Apps	Goals
Russia	2026	3	0
Total		3	0
