= Tomáš Vestenický =

Slovak footballer

Personal information
- Date of birth: 6 April 1996 (age 30)
- Place of birth: Topoľčany, Slovakia
- Height: 1.75 m (5 ft 9 in)
- Position: Forward

Team information
- Current team: Tivoli

Youth career
- Topvar Topoľčany
- 2007–2013: Nitra
- 2014–2015: Roma

Senior career*
Years	Team	Apps	(Gls)
2013–2014	Nitra	6	(0)
2014–2016	Roma	0	(0)
2015	→ Modena (loan)	3	(0)
2016	→ Cracovia (loan)	13	(1)
2016–2021	Cracovia	49	(3)
2018–2019	→ Nitra (loan)	39	(16)
2021	Chayka Peschanokopskoye	0	(0)
2021	Dinamo Bucharest	6	(0)
2022	Riteriai	16	(2)
2022–2023	Zlaté Moravce	13	(1)
2024–	Tivoli	8	(1)

International career
- Slovakia U16
2013–2014	Slovakia U17	8	(5)
2013–2015	Slovakia U19	8	(5)
2015–2018	Slovakia U21	11	(2)
- * Club domestic league appearances and goals as of 6 April 2024

Tomáš Vestenický (born 6 April 1996) is a Slovak professional footballer who plays as a forward for Italian club Tivoli.

== Club career ==
=== FC Nitra ===
He made his professional debut for Nitra against Spartak Trnava on 13 September 2013.

==== Loan to Roma ====
On 29 January 2014 he signed one-and-half year loan with option to buy with Italian Roma.

=== Cracovia ===
On 19 February 2016 he was sent on a half-year loan to Polish side Cracovia. After the loan ended, he signed a permanent contract with the club. In early 2021, he was moved by Cracovia to their second squad that plays in the III liga.

=== Chayka Peschanokopskoye ===
On 13 May 2021, he signed a two-year contract with Russian Football National League club Chayka Peschanokopskoye that was expected to begin on 1 July 2021. On 2 July 2021, Russian Football Union decided to relegate Chayka from second-tier FNL back to the third-tier PFL for the 2021–22 season for fixing games in the 2018–19 season. As foreign players are not allowed to play in the PFL, that meant a release from his contract with Chayka.

== Honours ==
Cracovia

- Polish Cup: 2019–20
- Polish Super Cup: 2020
