= Daniel Ripić =

Austrian footballer

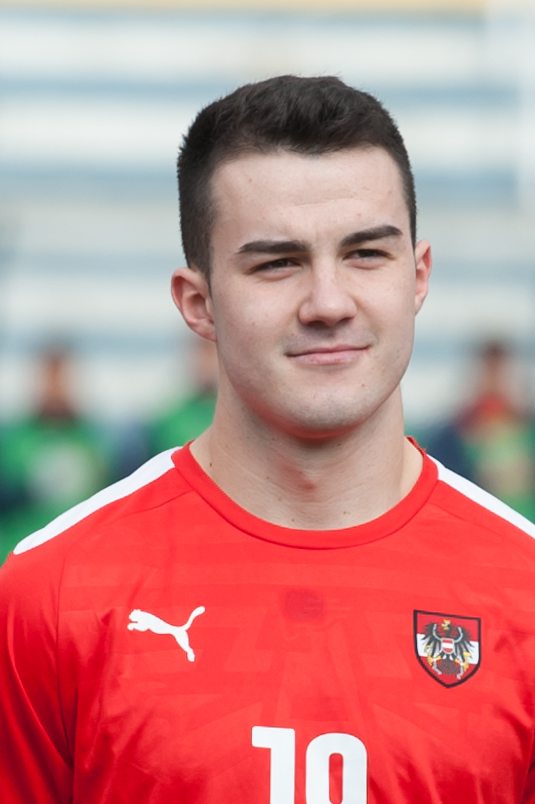

Personal information
- Full name: Daniel Ripić
- Date of birth: 14 March 1996 (age 30)
- Place of birth: Spittal an der Drau, Austria
- Height: 1.84 m (6 ft 1/2 in)
- Position: Forward

Team information
- Current team: Union Henndorf
- Number: 27

Youth career
- 2002–2007: SV Malta
- 2007–2009: SV Seeboden
- 2009: SV Malta
- 2009–2015: Red Bull Salzburg

Senior career*
Years	Team	Apps	(Gls)
2013–2015	FC Liefering	17	(1)
2015–2017	VfB Stuttgart II	6	(2)
2017	Osijek II		
2018	Union Henndorf		
2018	Grödig		
2019–2021	Hallwang 1968		

International career
2013	Austria U17	8	(1)
2014	Austria U18	2	(2)
2014–2015	Austria U19	10	(3)
- * Club domestic league appearances and goals as of 29 May 2018

Daniel Ripić (born 14 March 1996) is an Austrian professional footballer who is currently a free agent.

== Career ==
Ripić is the product of the Red Bull Salzburg academy, playing his first seasons of senior football for Red Bull's farm team FC Liefering. For the 2015–16 season Ripić moved to VfB Stuttgart II.

After scoring two goals in only six matches during his two seasons at VfB Stuttgart's third-tier reserve team Ripić terminated his contract in the summer of 2017, his next station being NK Osijek.

== International career ==
Ripić was born in Austria and is of Croatian descent. He is a youth international for Austria.
