= 2013 FIFA U-17 World Cup squads =

The following is a list of all the squads of the national teams that participated in the 2013 FIFA U-17 World Cup.

Names in bold went on to earn full international caps.

== Group A ==
=== United Arab Emirates ===
Head coach: Rashed Al-Badwawi

No.	Pos.	Player	Date of birth (age)	Caps	Goals	Club
1	GK	Mohamed Al-Mansoori	4 April 1996 (aged 17)			(United Arab Emirates Football Association) Al-Jazira
2	DF	Rashed Ahmed	18 March 1996 (aged 17)			(United Arab Emirates Football Association) Al-Nasr
3	DF	Khalid Mohammad	23 June 1996 (aged 17)			(United Arab Emirates Football Association) Al-Shabab
4	DF	Sultan Al-Badrani	28 June 1996 (aged 17)			(United Arab Emirates Football Association) Al-Ain
5	DF	Ahmed Rashed	19 January 1997 (aged 16)			(United Arab Emirates Football Association) Al-Wahda
6	MF	Abdulla Al-Hammadi	8 March 1996 (aged 17)			(United Arab Emirates Football Association) Al-Dhafra
7	MF	**Sultan Al-Shamsi**	22 June 1996 (aged 17)			(United Arab Emirates Football Association) Al-Jazira
8	FW	Hussain Faisal	6 February 1996 (aged 17)			(United Arab Emirates Football Association) Al-Jazira
9	FW	**Mohamed Al-Akbari**	15 March 1996 (aged 17)			(United Arab Emirates Football Association) Al-Wahda
10	MF	Lashkari Ibrahim	25 April 1996 (aged 17)			(United Arab Emirates Football Association) Al-Nasr
11	FW	Khaled Khalfan	23 January 1996 (aged 17)			(United Arab Emirates Football Association) Al-Ain
12	FW	**Abdullah Kazim**	31 July 1996 (aged 17)			(United Arab Emirates Football Association) Al-Wasl
13	MF	Abdulla Omar	31 December 1996 (aged 16)			(United Arab Emirates Football Association) Al-Wasl
14	DF	Firas Al-Khusaibi	28 January 1996 (aged 17)			(United Arab Emirates Football Association) Al-Ain
15	MF	Humaid Salmeen	6 September 1996 (aged 17)			(United Arab Emirates Football Association) Al-Ahli
16	FW	**Zaid Al-Ameri**	31 December 1997 (aged 15)			(United Arab Emirates Football Association) Al-Jazira
17	GK	**Mohamed Al Shamsi**	4 January 1997 (aged 16)			(United Arab Emirates Football Association) Al-Wahda
18	FW	**Suhail Al-Noubi**	9 January 1996 (aged 17)			(United Arab Emirates Football Association) Baniyas
19	DF	Omar Jumaa	15 February 1996 (aged 17)			(United Arab Emirates Football Association) Al-Wasl
20	GK	Zayed Al-Hammadi	23 February 1996 (aged 17)			(United Arab Emirates Football Association) Al-Dhafra
21	MF	Shahin Suroor	21 June 1996 (aged 17)			(United Arab Emirates Football Association) Al-Jazira

=== Honduras ===
Head coach: José Valladares

No.	Pos.	Player	Date of birth (age)	Caps	Goals	Club
1	GK	Cristian Hernández	22 September 1996 (aged 17)			(National Autonomous Federation of Football of Honduras) Valle
2	DF	**Kevin Álvarez**	3 August 1996 (aged 17)			(National Autonomous Federation of Football of Honduras) Olimpia
3	DF	Álvaro Romero	10 February 1997 (aged 16)			(National Autonomous Federation of Football of Honduras) Real España
4	DF	Luis Santos	5 March 1996 (aged 17)			(National Autonomous Federation of Football of Honduras) Olimpia
5	DF	Anoal Hernández	3 December 1996 (aged 16)			(National Autonomous Federation of Football of Honduras) Olimpia
6	MF	**Devron García**	17 February 1996 (aged 17)			(National Autonomous Federation of Football of Honduras) Victoria
7	FW	Brayan Velásquez	8 May 1996 (aged 17)			(National Autonomous Federation of Football of Honduras) Olimpia
8	MF	Christopher Alegría	29 January 1996 (aged 17)			(National Autonomous Federation of Football of Honduras) Real España
9	FW	**Alberth Elis**	12 February 1996 (aged 17)			(National Autonomous Federation of Football of Honduras) Olimpia
10	MF	Isaac Borjas	7 April 1996 (aged 17)			(National Autonomous Federation of Football of Honduras) Valencia
11	MF	Rembrandt Flores	12 May 1997 (aged 16)			(National Autonomous Federation of Football of Honduras) Olimpia
12	GK	Fernando Cabrera	21 March 1996 (aged 17)			(National Autonomous Federation of Football of Honduras) Real España
13	FW	Carlos Palacios	14 February 1996 (aged 17)			(National Autonomous Federation of Football of Honduras) Marathón
14	DF	José Fiallos	28 February 1996 (aged 17)			(National Autonomous Federation of Football of Honduras) Marathón
15	MF	Steven Ramos	1 October 1996 (aged 17)			(National Autonomous Federation of Football of Honduras) Real España
16	DF	Kenneth Hernández	26 May 1997 (aged 16)			(National Autonomous Federation of Football of Honduras) Victoria
17	MF	Fredy Medina	14 January 1996 (aged 17)			(National Autonomous Federation of Football of Honduras) Atlético Choloma
18	FW	Jorge Bodden	12 June 1996 (aged 17)			(National Autonomous Federation of Football of Honduras) Valencia
19	FW	Darwin Arita	15 June 1996 (aged 17)			(National Autonomous Federation of Football of Honduras) Real España
20	FW	**Kevin López**	3 February 1996 (aged 17)			(National Autonomous Federation of Football of Honduras) Motagua
21	GK	Khristian Laínez	27 February 1996 (aged 17)			(National Autonomous Federation of Football of Honduras) Deportes Savio

=== Brazil ===
Head coach: Alexandre Gallo

No.	Pos.	Player	Date of birth (age)	Caps	Goals	Club
1	GK	Marcos	13 April 1996 (aged 17)			(Brazilian Football Confederation) Fluminense
2	DF	Auro Jr.	23 January 1996 (aged 17)			(Brazilian Football Confederation) São Paulo
3	DF	Lucão	23 March 1996 (aged 17)			(Brazilian Football Confederation) São Paulo
4	DF	Eduardo Bauermann	13 February 1996 (aged 17)			(Brazilian Football Confederation) Internacional
5	MF	Danilo Barbosa	28 February 1996 (aged 17)			(Brazilian Football Confederation) Vasco da Gama
6	DF	Abner	30 May 1996 (aged 17)			(Brazilian Football Confederation) Coritiba
7	FW	Caio Rangel	16 January 1996 (aged 17)			(Brazilian Football Confederation) Flamengo
8	MF	Gustavo Hebling	5 April 1996 (aged 17)			(Brazilian Football Confederation) São Paulo
9	FW	Mosquito	6 January 1996 (aged 17)			(Brazilian Football Confederation) Atlético Paranaense
10	MF	Nathan	13 March 1996 (aged 17)			(Brazilian Football Confederation) Atlético Paranaense
11	MF	Gabriel Boschilia	5 March 1996 (aged 17)			(Brazilian Football Confederation) São Paulo
12	GK	Thiago	12 June 1996 (aged 17)			(Brazilian Football Confederation) Flamengo
13	DF	Jeferson	22 June 1996 (aged 17)			(Brazilian Football Confederation) Ponte Preta
14	DF	Léo Mendes	15 February 1996 (aged 17)			(Brazilian Football Confederation) Internacional
15	DF	**Léo Pereira**	31 January 1996 (aged 17)			(Brazilian Football Confederation) Atlético Paranaense
16	MF	Thiago Maia	22 March 1997 (aged 16)			(Brazilian Football Confederation) Santos
17	MF	Índio	28 February 1996 (aged 17)			(Brazilian Football Confederation) Vasco da Gama
18	FW	**Gabriel Barbosa**	30 August 1996 (aged 17)			(Brazilian Football Confederation) Santos
19	FW	Joanderson	16 February 1996 (aged 17)			(Brazilian Football Confederation) São Paulo
20	FW	Kenedy	8 February 1996 (aged 17)			(Brazilian Football Confederation) Fluminense
21	GK	Gabriel Bubniack	10 June 1997 (aged 16)			(Brazilian Football Confederation) Coritiba

=== Slovakia ===
Head coach: Ladislav Pecko

No.	Pos.	Player	Date of birth (age)	Caps	Goals	Club
1	GK	Martin Junas	9 March 1996 (aged 17)			(Slovak Football Association) Senica
2	MF	Marek Rajnik	22 September 1996 (aged 17)			(Slovak Football Association) Senica
3	DF	**Denis Vavro**	10 April 1996 (aged 17)			(Slovak Football Association) Žilina
4	MF	Martin Slaninka	26 March 1996 (aged 17)			(Slovak Football Association) Žilina
5	FW	Matej Lovás	31 January 1996 (aged 17)			(Slovak Football Association) Ružomberok
6	DF	Michal Vodecky	22 August 1996 (aged 17)			(Slovak Football Association) Banská Bystrica
7	MF	**Miroslav Káčer**	2 February 1996 (aged 17)			(Slovak Football Association) Žilina
8	MF	Jakub Grič	5 July 1996 (aged 17)			(Slovak Football Association) Zemplín Michalovce
9	FW	Tomáš Vestenický	6 April 1996 (aged 17)			(Slovak Football Association) Nitra
10	MF	**Jakub Hromada**	25 May 1996 (aged 17)			(Italian Football Federation) Juventus
11	MF	Filip Lesniak	14 May 1996 (aged 17)			(The Football Association) Tottenham Hotspur
12	GK	Juraj Semanko	1 February 1996 (aged 17)			(Football Association of the Czech Republic) Slovácko
13	MF	Lukáš Čmelík	13 April 1996 (aged 17)			(Slovak Football Association) Žilina
14	DF	**Michal Sipľak**	2 February 1996 (aged 17)			(Slovak Football Association) Slovan Bratislava
15	DF	Šimon Kupec	11 February 1996 (aged 17)			(Slovak Football Association) Banská Bystrica
16	DF	Andrej Kadlec	2 February 1996 (aged 17)			(Slovak Football Association) Žilina
17	FW	**Lukáš Haraslín**	26 May 1996 (aged 17)			(Italian Football Federation) Parma
18	DF	Atila Varga	11 April 1996 (aged 17)			(Italian Football Federation) Juventus
19	MF	**Juraj Chvátal**	13 July 1996 (aged 17)			(Slovak Football Association) Senica
20	MF	Nikolas Špalek	12 February 1997 (aged 16)			(Slovak Football Association) Nitra
21	GK	**Marek Rodák**	13 December 1996 (aged 16)			(The Football Association) Fulham

== Group B ==
=== Uruguay ===
Head coach: Fabián Coito

No.	Pos.	Player	Date of birth (age)	Caps	Goals	Club
1	GK	Thiago Cardozo	31 July 1996 (aged 17)			(Uruguayan Football Association) Peñarol
2	DF	Joel Bregonis	23 January 1996 (aged 17)			(Uruguayan Football Association) Nacional
3	DF	Fabrizio Buschiazzo	7 July 1996 (aged 17)			(Uruguayan Football Association) Peñarol
4	DF	Darwin Avila	10 April 1996 (aged 17)			(Uruguayan Football Association) Peñarol
5	MF	Facundo Ospitaleche	11 April 1996 (aged 17)			(Uruguayan Football Association) Defensor Sporting
6	DF	Aldo Martilotta	20 February 1996 (aged 17)			(Uruguayan Football Association) Danubio
7	FW	Gonzalo Latorre	26 April 1996 (aged 17)			(Uruguayan Football Association) Peñarol
8	MF	Franco Pizzichillo	3 January 1996 (aged 17)			(Uruguayan Football Association) Defensor Sporting
9	FW	Francis D'Albenas	11 January 1996 (aged 17)			(Uruguayan Football Association) River Plate Montevideo
10	MF	Kevin Méndez	10 January 1996 (aged 17)			(Uruguayan Football Association) Peñarol
11	FW	Franco Acosta	5 March 1996 (aged 17)			(Uruguayan Football Association) Fénix
12	GK	Facundo Silva	4 July 1996 (aged 17)			(Uruguayan Football Association) Danubio
13	MF	Jhon Pintos	14 January 1996 (aged 17)			(Uruguayan Football Association) Liverpool Montevideo
14	DF	José Etcheverry	10 May 1996 (aged 17)			(Uruguayan Football Association) Defensor Sporting
15	MF	Gastón Faber	21 April 1996 (aged 17)			(Uruguayan Football Association) Danubio
16	DF	Elias González	29 October 1996 (aged 16)			(Uruguayan Football Association) River Plate Montevideo
17	FW	Leandro Otormín	30 July 1996 (aged 17)			(Uruguayan Football Association) Nacional
18	FW	Marcio Benítez	3 June 1996 (aged 17)			(Uruguayan Football Association) Nacional
19	DF	Emmanuel González	12 January 1996 (aged 17)			(Uruguayan Football Association) Liverpool Montevideo
20	DF	**Mathías Suárez**	24 June 1996 (aged 17)			(Uruguayan Football Association) Defensor Sporting
21	GK	Kevin Larrea	19 April 1996 (aged 17)			(Uruguayan Football Association) Defensor Sporting

=== New Zealand ===
Head coach: (England) Darren Bazeley

No.	Pos.	Player	Date of birth (age)	Caps	Goals	Club
1	GK	Zac Speedy	29 October 1996 (aged 16)			(New Zealand Football) Three Kings United
2	DF	Riley Kelliher	17 April 1996 (aged 17)			(New Zealand Football) Island Bay United
3	DF	Cory Brown	3 April 1996 (aged 17)			(New Zealand Football) Island Bay United
4	DF	Nick Forrester	20 February 1996 (aged 17)			(New Zealand Football) Northern-Based
5	DF	**Adam Mitchell**	1 June 1996 (aged 17)			(New Zealand Football) Central United
6	MF	Alex Palezevic	11 November 1996 (aged 16)			(New Zealand Football) Island Bay United
7	MF	**Alex Rufer**	12 June 1996 (aged 17)			(New Zealand Football) Wellington Phoenix
8	MF	Michael den Heijer	14 April 1996 (aged 17)			(New Zealand Football) Onehunga Sports
9	FW	Elijah Neblett	13 May 1996 (aged 17)			(New Zealand Football) Birkenhead United
10	MF	**Matthew Ridenton**	11 March 1996 (aged 17)			(New Zealand Football) Central United
11	FW	**Monty Patterson**	9 December 1996 (aged 16)			(New Zealand Football) Eastern Suburbs
12	GK	**Oliver Sail**	13 January 1996 (aged 17)			(New Zealand Football) Central United
13	DF	Spiros Agathos	26 April 1996 (aged 17)			(Football Australia) Newcastle Jets
14	FW	Stuart Holthusen	1 January 1996 (aged 17)			(New Zealand Football) Onehunga Sports
15	MF	**Andre De Jong**	2 November 1996 (aged 16)			(New Zealand Football) Ellerslie
16	MF	Tamupiwa Dimairo	22 March 1996 (aged 17)			(New Zealand Football) Northern-Based
17	FW	Nick Sugden	14 January 1996 (aged 17)			(New Zealand Football) Onehunga Sports
18	FW	Andrew Blake	14 March 1996 (aged 17)			(New Zealand Football) Northern-Based
19	FW	Judd Baker	2 August 1996 (aged 17)			(New Zealand Football) East Coast Bays
20	MF	**Clayton Lewis**	12 February 1997 (aged 16)			(New Zealand Football) Wellington Olympic
21	GK	Samuel Copp	22 April 1997 (aged 16)			(New Zealand Football) Forrest Hill Milford

=== Ivory Coast ===
Head coach: Ibrahima Kamara

No.	Pos.	Player	Date of birth (age)	Caps	Goals	Club
1	GK	Seck Diabagate	13 August 1996 (aged 17)			(Ghana Football Association) Royal FC
2	FW	Moussa Bakayoko	27 December 1996 (aged 16)			(Ivorian Football Federation) USC Bassam
3	FW	**Yakou Méïté**	11 February 1996 (aged 17)			(French Football Federation) Paris Saint-Germain
4	DF	**Ismaël Diallo**	29 January 1997 (aged 16)			(Ivorian Football Federation) ES Bingerville
5	MF	Braciano Ta Bi	5 December 1999 (aged 13)			(Ivorian Football Federation) Athletic FC Adjamé
6	MF	Ousmane Diallo	17 November 1997 (aged 15)			(Ivorian Football Federation) ASI d'Abengourou
7	MF	Junior Ahissan	10 November 1996 (aged 16)			(Ivorian Football Federation) Ivoire Académie
8	MF	Kouassi Begbin	30 December 1996 (aged 16)			(Ivorian Football Federation) CO Domoraud
9	FW	Anderson Niangbo	6 October 1999 (aged 14)			(Ivorian Football Federation) USC Bassam
10	MF	**Franck Kessié**	19 December 1996 (aged 16)			(Ivorian Football Federation) Stella Club
11	FW	Cédric Khaleb Kouadio	25 July 1997 (aged 16)			(Ivorian Football Federation) ES Bingerville
12	DF	Toussaint Kouakou	27 December 1996 (aged 16)			(Ivorian Football Federation) AS Divo
13	MF	Aboubakar Keita	5 November 1997 (aged 15)			(Ivorian Football Federation) ATM Abobo
14	DF	**Sherif Jimoh**	4 May 1996 (aged 17)			(Ivorian Football Federation) Athletic FC Adjamé
15	FW	Chris Bedia	5 March 1996 (aged 17)			(French Football Federation) Tours
16	GK	Koko Gahie	1 February 1997 (aged 16)			(Ivorian Football Federation) AS Denguélé
17	FW	Kouamé N'Guessan	26 December 1996 (aged 16)			(Ivorian Football Federation) Séwé Sport
18	DF	Souleymane Diaby	8 October 1999 (aged 14)			(Ivorian Football Federation) USC Bassam
19	MF	Digbo Maïga	1 January 1996 (aged 17)			(Ivorian Football Federation) Ivoire Académie
20	DF	Narcisse Tano	1 January 1996 (aged 17)			(Ivorian Football Federation) Alliance d'Abengourou
21	GK	El Hadj Danté	18 August 1998 (aged 15)			(Ivorian Football Federation) Espoir de Koumassi

=== Italy ===
Head coach: Daniele Zoratto

No.	Pos.	Player	Date of birth (age)	Caps	Goals	Club
1	GK	Simone Scuffet	31 May 1996 (aged 17)			(Italian Football Federation) Udinese
2	DF	**Davide Calabria**	6 December 1996 (aged 16)			(Italian Football Federation) Milan
3	DF	**Federico Dimarco**	10 November 1997 (aged 15)			(Italian Football Federation) Internazionale
4	MF	Mario Pugliese	23 June 1996 (aged 17)			(Italian Football Federation) Atalanta
5	DF	Elio Capradossi	11 March 1996 (aged 17)			(Italian Football Federation) Roma
6	DF	Ivan De Santis	21 May 1997 (aged 16)			(Italian Football Federation) Milan
7	FW	Gennaro Tutino	20 August 1996 (aged 17)			(Italian Football Federation) Napoli
8	MF	Andrea Palazzi	24 February 1996 (aged 17)			(Italian Football Federation) Internazionale
9	FW	Alberto Cerri	16 April 1996 (aged 17)			(Italian Football Federation) Parma
10	MF	Vittorio Parigini	25 March 1996 (aged 17)			(Italian Football Federation) Torino
11	FW	Luca Vido	3 February 1997 (aged 16)			(Italian Football Federation) Milan
12	GK	**Emil Audero**	18 January 1997 (aged 16)			(Italian Football Federation) Juventus
13	DF	Roberto Pirrello	17 March 1996 (aged 17)			(Italian Football Federation) Palermo
14	MF	Alberto Tibolla	31 January 1996 (aged 17)			(Italian Football Federation) Chievo
15	MF	Demetrio Steffè	30 July 1996 (aged 17)			(Italian Football Federation) Internazionale
16	DF	Arturo Calabresi	17 March 1996 (aged 17)			(Italian Football Federation) Roma
17	DF	Matteo Lomolino	11 March 1996 (aged 17)			(Italian Football Federation) Modena
18	FW	Michael Fabbro	10 May 1996 (aged 17)			(Italian Football Federation) Milan
19	MF	Enrico Baldini	15 October 1996 (aged 17)			(Italian Football Federation) Internazionale
20	MF	Antonio Romano	23 March 1996 (aged 17)			(Italian Football Federation) Napoli
21	GK	Lorenzo Ferrari	9 March 1996 (aged 17)			(Italian Football Federation) Milan

== Group C ==
=== Croatia ===
Head coach: Ivan Gudelj

No.	Pos.	Player	Date of birth (age)	Caps	Goals	Club
1	GK	Marko Marić	3 January 1996 (aged 17)			(Austrian Football Association) Rapid Wien
2	DF	Hrvoje Džijan	26 June 1996 (aged 17)			(Croatian Football Federation) Dinamo Zagreb
3	DF	Petar Mamić	6 March 1996 (aged 17)			(Croatian Football Federation) Dinamo Zagreb
4	MF	**Ivan Šunjić**	9 October 1996 (aged 17)			(Croatian Football Federation) Dinamo Zagreb
5	DF	**Duje Ćaleta-Car**	17 September 1996 (aged 17)			(Austrian Football Association) Pasching
6	DF	Lukas Čuljak	5 March 1996 (aged 17)			(German Football Association) Borussia Dortmund
7	FW	Robert Murić	12 March 1996 (aged 17)			(Croatian Football Federation) Dinamo Zagreb
8	MF	Karlo Lulić	10 May 1996 (aged 17)			(Croatian Football Federation) Osijek
9	FW	Fran Brodić	8 January 1997 (aged 16)			(Croatian Football Federation) Dinamo Zagreb
10	FW	**Alen Halilović**	18 June 1996 (aged 17)			(Croatian Football Federation) Dinamo Zagreb
11	MF	Ante Roguljić	11 March 1996 (aged 17)			(Austrian Football Association) Red Bull Salzburg
12	GK	Dario Miškić	18 April 1996 (aged 17)			(Croatian Football Federation) Dinamo Zagreb
13	DF	Petar Bočkaj	23 July 1996 (aged 17)			(Croatian Football Federation) Dinamo Zagreb
14	DF	Marko Stolnik	8 May 1996 (aged 17)			(Croatian Football Federation) Dinamo Zagreb
15	MF	Bojan Knežević	28 January 1997 (aged 16)			(Croatian Football Federation) Dinamo Zagreb
16	DF	Franjo Prce	7 January 1996 (aged 17)			(Croatian Football Federation) Hajduk Split
17	MF	Frane Vojković	20 December 1996 (aged 16)			(Croatian Football Federation) Hajduk Split
18	MF	Ivan Fiolić	29 April 1996 (aged 17)			(Croatian Football Federation) Dinamo Zagreb
19	FW	Ante Blažević	5 May 1996 (aged 17)			(Croatian Football Federation) Hajduk Split
20	MF	Elvir Maloku	14 May 1996 (aged 17)			(Croatian Football Federation) Hajduk Split
21	GK	**Ivo Grbić**	18 January 1996 (aged 17)			(Croatian Football Federation) Hajduk Split

=== Morocco ===
Head coach: Abdellah Idrissi

No.	Pos.	Player	Date of birth (age)	Caps	Goals	Club
1	GK	Oussayd Belkouch	15 January 1996 (aged 17)			(Royal Belgian Football Association) Club Brugge
2	DF	Fahd Moufi	5 May 1996 (aged 17)			(French Football Federation) Lyon
3	DF	Mohamed El Bouazzati	9 January 1997 (aged 16)			(German Football Association) Borussia Dortmund
4	DF	Yassine Khadraoui	3 February 1997 (aged 16)			(German Football Association) Bayer Leverkusen
5	DF	Achraf Achaoui	10 December 1996 (aged 16)			(Royal Belgian Football Association) Standard Liège
6	MF	**Sofyan Amrabat**	21 August 1996 (aged 17)			(Royal Dutch Football Association) Utrecht
7	MF	Nabil Jaadi	1 July 1996 (aged 17)			(Royal Belgian Football Association) Anderlecht
8	MF	Karim Essikal	8 February 1996 (aged 17)			(Royal Belgian Football Association) Club Brugge
9	FW	Karim Achahbar	3 January 1996 (aged 17)			(French Football Federation) Guingamp
10	MF	Walid Sabbar	25 February 1996 (aged 17)			(Royal Moroccan Football Federation) Raja Casablanca
11	FW	Younes Bnou Marzouk	2 March 1996 (aged 17)			(Italian Football Federation) Juventus
12	GK	**Ahmed Reda Tagnaouti**	5 April 1996 (aged 17)			(Royal Moroccan Football Federation) AMF
13	DF	Yassine Jbira	16 February 1996 (aged 17)			(Royal Moroccan Football Federation) AMF
14	MF	Omar Arjoune	1 February 1996 (aged 17)			(Royal Moroccan Football Federation) Raja Casablanca
15	DF	Younes Boudadi	23 January 1996 (aged 17)			(Royal Belgian Football Association) Club Brugge
16	DF	Mohamed Saoud	30 January 1996 (aged 17)			(Royal Moroccan Football Federation) Moghreb Tétouan
17	FW	Zouhair El Moutaraji	1 April 1996 (aged 17)			(Royal Moroccan Football Federation) Wydad Casablanca
18	MF	Hamza Sakhi	7 June 1996 (aged 17)			(French Football Federation) Châteauroux
19	MF	Taoufiq Naciri	9 February 1997 (aged 16)			(Royal Dutch Football Association) PSV
20	MF	Bilal Jellal	28 March 1996 (aged 17)			(Royal Belgian Football Association) Anderlecht
21	GK	Achraf Sidki	6 January 1997 (aged 16)			(Royal Moroccan Football Federation) AMF

=== Panama ===
Head coach: Jorge Dely Valdés

No.	Pos.	Player	Date of birth (age)	Caps	Goals	Club
1	GK	Jaime de Gracia	11 May 1996 (aged 17)			(Panamanian Football Federation) Tauro
2	DF	Christopher Bared	13 March 1996 (aged 17)			(United States Soccer Federation) Soccer Academy of the Americas
3	DF	**Kevin Galván**	10 March 1996 (aged 17)			(Panamanian Football Federation) Millenium FC
4	DF	Jomar Díaz	29 October 1996 (aged 16)			(Panamanian Football Federation) Río Abajo
5	DF	**Chin Hormechea**	12 May 1996 (aged 17)			(Panamanian Football Federation) Árabe Unido
6	DF	Jesús Araya	3 January 1996 (aged 17)			(Panamanian Football Federation) Tauro
7	MF	Eliecer Domínguez	15 February 1996 (aged 17)			(Panamanian Football Federation) Tauro
8	DF	Félix General	19 April 1996 (aged 17)			(Panamanian Football Federation) Tauro
9	FW	Luis Zuñiga	27 January 1997 (aged 16)			(Panamanian Football Federation) Río Abajo
10	FW	**Ismael Díaz**	12 May 1997 (aged 16)			(Panamanian Football Federation) Tauro
11	MF	Luis Cañate	9 August 1996 (aged 17)			(Panamanian Football Federation) Árabe Unido
12	GK	Roberto Cueto	23 March 1996 (aged 17)			(Panamanian Football Federation) Tauro
13	MF	Stiben Santos	14 January 1998 (aged 15)			(Panamanian Football Federation) Río Abajo
14	MF	Werner Wald	2 February 1996 (aged 17)			(Panamanian Football Federation) Tauro
15	DF	Luis Alain	26 March 1996 (aged 17)			(Panamanian Football Federation) CA Veragüense
16	MF	Vidal González	10 April 1996 (aged 17)			(Panamanian Football Federation) Tauro
17	FW	Moises Gil	9 February 1997 (aged 16)			(Panamanian Football Federation) Bagoso FC
18	FW	Ervin Zorrilla	14 May 1996 (aged 17)			(Panamanian Football Federation) Tauro
19	MF	Milciades Molina	6 January 1997 (aged 16)			(Panamanian Football Federation) Millenium FC
20	DF	Luis Pereira	27 March 1996 (aged 17)			(Panamanian Football Federation) Árabe Unido
21	GK	Hermes Ortega	26 March 1996 (aged 17)			(Panamanian Football Federation) Millenium FC

=== Uzbekistan ===
Head coach: Dilshod Nuraliev

No.	Pos.	Player	Date of birth (age)	Caps	Goals	Club
1	GK	Sarvar Karimov	25 December 1996 (aged 16)			(Uzbekistan Football Association) Lokomotiv Tashkent
2	DF	**Rustamjon Ashurmatov**	7 July 1996 (aged 17)			(Uzbekistan Football Association) Bunyodkor
3	DF	Abdulaziz Juraboev	4 May 1996 (aged 17)			(Uzbekistan Football Association) Qizilqum Zarafshon
4	DF	**Akramjon Komilov**	14 March 1996 (aged 17)			(Uzbekistan Football Association) Bunyodkor
5	DF	**Odiljon Hamrobekov**	13 February 1996 (aged 17)			(Uzbekistan Football Association) Nasaf Qarshi
6	DF	Khumoyun Agzamov	17 January 1996 (aged 17)			(Uzbekistan Football Association) Pakhtakor Tashkent
7	DF	**Jamshid Boltaboev**	3 October 1996 (aged 17)			(Uzbekistan Football Association) Pakhtakor Tashkent
8	MF	Abbos Nematillaev	15 August 1996 (aged 17)			(Uzbekistan Football Association) Pakhtakor Tashkent
9	DF	Ibrokhim Abdullaev	5 December 1996 (aged 16)			(Uzbekistan Football Association) Pakhtakor Tashkent
10	MF	**Javokhir Sidikov**	8 December 1996 (aged 16)			(Uzbekistan Football Association) Pakhtakor Tashkent
11	FW	Akobir Turaev	3 November 1996 (aged 16)			(Uzbekistan Football Association) FK Bukhara
12	GK	Shokhrukhjon Eshbutaev	19 December 1996 (aged 16)			(Uzbekistan Football Association) FBS Yangiyer
13	MF	**Sanjar Kodirkulov**	27 May 1997 (aged 16)			(Uzbekistan Football Association) Bunyodkor
14	MF	Islombek Karimov	9 January 1996 (aged 17)			(Uzbekistan Football Association) Pakhtakor Tashkent
15	MF	Izzatilla Abdullaev	16 January 1996 (aged 17)			(Uzbekistan Football Association) Pakhtakor Tashkent
16	MF	Ravshanbek Khursanov	19 August 1996 (aged 17)			(Uzbekistan Football Association) Pakhtakor Tashkent
17	MF	**Dostonbek Khamdamov**	24 July 1996 (aged 17)			(Uzbekistan Football Association) Bunyodkor
18	DF	Oybek Erkinov	21 August 1996 (aged 17)			(Uzbekistan Football Association) Pakhtakor Tashkent
19	FW	Shohjahon Abbasov	27 January 1996 (aged 17)			(Uzbekistan Football Association) Mash'al Mubarek
20	MF	**Otabek Shukurov**	22 June 1996 (aged 17)			(Uzbekistan Football Association) Mash'al Mubarek
21	GK	Shokhrukhjon Raimov	19 February 1997 (aged 16)			(Uzbekistan Football Association) Pakhtakor Tashkent

== Group D ==
=== Tunisia ===
Head coach: Abdelhay Ben Soltane

No.	Pos.	Player	Date of birth (age)	Caps	Goals	Club
1	GK	**Sabri Ben Hessen**	13 June 1996 (aged 17)			(Tunisian Football Federation) CS Sfaxien
2	DF	Yasser Slimi	7 March 1996 (aged 17)			(Tunisian Football Federation) Étoile du Sahel
3	DF	Ameur el Omrani	11 September 1996 (aged 17)			(Tunisian Football Federation) Étoile du Sahel
4	DF	Marouane Sahraoui	9 January 1996 (aged 17)			(Tunisian Football Federation) Espérance Tunis
5	DF	Bahaeddine Othman	3 February 1996 (aged 17)			(Tunisian Football Federation) Étoile du Sahel
6	MF	Wassim Naghmouchi	17 April 1996 (aged 17)			(Tunisian Football Federation) Espérance Tunis
7	MF	Mouez Aboud	18 July 1996 (aged 17)			(Tunisian Football Federation) Espérance Tunis
8	MF	Chiheb Jbeli	26 May 1996 (aged 17)			(Tunisian Football Federation) Club Africain
9	FW	**Hazem Haj Hassen**	15 February 1996 (aged 17)			(Tunisian Football Federation) Étoile du Sahel
10	FW	Bilel Mejri	6 February 1996 (aged 17)			(Tunisian Football Federation) Espérance Tunis
11	MF	Kouni Khalfa	12 December 1996 (aged 16)			(Tunisian Football Federation) Club Africain
12	DF	Sabri Akrout	29 January 1996 (aged 17)			(Tunisian Football Federation) Espérance Tunis
13	MF	**Mohamed Dräger**	25 June 1996 (aged 17)			(German Football Association) SC Freiburg
14	FW	Nidhal Ben Salem	31 January 1996 (aged 17)			(Tunisian Football Federation) Espérance Tunis
15	MF	**Firas Ben Larbi**	27 May 1996 (aged 17)			(Tunisian Football Federation) AS Marsa
16	GK	Charfeddine Ghidhaoui	18 May 1996 (aged 17)			(Tunisian Football Federation) JS Kairouan
17	MF	Maher Gabsi	22 March 1996 (aged 17)			(Tunisian Football Federation) Espérance Tunis
18	DF	Khalil Hnid	16 January 1996 (aged 17)			(Tunisian Football Federation) AS Marsa
19	MF	Rached Arfaoui	7 March 1996 (aged 17)			(Tunisian Football Federation) Club Africain
20	DF	Mohamed Salem	6 January 1996 (aged 17)			(Tunisian Football Federation) Espérance Tunis
21	GK	Hamza Ben Chrifia	17 July 1996 (aged 17)			(Tunisian Football Federation) Espérance Tunis

=== Venezuela ===
Head coach: Rafael Dudamel

No.	Pos.	Player	Date of birth (age)	Caps	Goals	Club
1	GK	Enmis Rodríguez	4 July 1996 (aged 17)			(Venezuelan Football Federation) Carabobo
2	DF	Juan Tineo	13 April 1996 (aged 17)			(Venezuelan Football Federation) Atlético Venezuela
3	DF	Jorge Ruiz	22 April 1996 (aged 17)			(Venezuelan Football Federation) Deportivo La Guaira
4	DF	José Marrufo	12 May 1996 (aged 17)			(Venezuelan Football Federation) Caracas
5	MF	Andrés Benítez	22 March 1996 (aged 17)			(Venezuelan Football Federation) Trujillanos
6	DF	Franko Díaz	6 February 1996 (aged 17)			(Venezuelan Football Federation) Deportivo Lara
7	FW	Andris Herrera	20 October 1996 (aged 16)			(Venezuelan Football Federation) Caracas
8	MF	Eduardo Maceira	30 April 1996 (aged 17)			(Venezuelan Football Federation) Deportivo La Guaira
9	FW	José Márquez	21 February 1996 (aged 17)			(Venezuelan Football Federation) Aragua
10	MF	David Zalzman	4 March 1996 (aged 17)			(Venezuelan Football Federation) Deportivo Anzoátegui
11	MF	Luis Rodríguez	23 January 1996 (aged 17)			(Mexican Football Federation) Pachuca
12	GK	Beycker Velásquez	6 October 1996 (aged 17)			(Venezuelan Football Federation) Caracas
13	MF	José Hernández	26 June 1997 (aged 16)			(Venezuelan Football Federation) Caracas
14	MF	**Francisco La Mantía**	24 February 1996 (aged 17)			(Venezuelan Football Federation) Estudiantes de Mérida
15	FW	José Caraballo	21 February 1996 (aged 17)			(Venezuelan Football Federation) Caracas
16	MF	Samuel Marquina	7 June 1996 (aged 17)			(Venezuelan Football Federation) Deportivo Gulima
17	MF	Carlos Victora	10 September 1996 (aged 17)			(Venezuelan Football Federation) Carabobo
18	MF	Leomar Pinto	17 March 1997 (aged 16)			(Venezuelan Football Federation) Caracas
19	DF	Diego Osio	3 January 1997 (aged 16)			(Venezuelan Football Federation) Carabobo
20	FW	Héctor Cantele	20 September 1996 (aged 17)			(Venezuelan Football Federation) Caracas
21	GK	Pedro Ramos	26 February 1996 (aged 17)			(Venezuelan Football Federation) Caracas

=== Russia ===
Head coach: (Turkmenistan) Dmitri Khomukha

No.	Pos.	Player	Date of birth (age)	Caps	Goals	Club
1	GK	Anton Mitryushkin	8 February 1996 (aged 17)			(Russian Football Union) Spartak Moscow
2	DF	Sergei Makarov	3 October 1996 (aged 17)			(Russian Football Union) Lokomotiv Moscow
3	DF	**Nikita Chernov**	14 January 1996 (aged 17)			(Russian Football Union) CSKA Moscow
4	DF	Dzhamaldin Khodzhaniyazov	18 July 1996 (aged 17)			(Russian Football Union) Zenit Saint Petersburg
5	DF	Denis Yakuba	26 May 1996 (aged 17)			(Russian Football Union) Chertanovo Moscow
6	MF	**Dmitri Barinov**	11 September 1996 (aged 17)			(Russian Football Union) Lokomotiv Moscow
7	MF	Aleksandr Makarov	24 April 1996 (aged 17)			(Russian Football Union) CSKA Moscow
8	MF	Ayaz Guliyev	27 November 1996 (aged 16)			(Russian Football Union) Spartak Moscow
9	FW	**Ramil Sheydayev**	15 March 1996 (aged 17)			(Russian Football Union) Zenit Saint Petersburg
10	MF	**Aleksandr Golovin**	30 May 1996 (aged 17)			(Russian Football Union) CSKA Moscow
11	MF	Aleksandr Zuyev	26 June 1996 (aged 17)			(Russian Football Union) Chertanovo Moscow
12	GK	Aleksei Kuznetsov	20 August 1996 (aged 17)			(Russian Football Union) Chertanovo Moscow
13	MF	Danila Buranov	11 February 1996 (aged 17)			(Russian Football Union) Spartak Moscow
14	DF	Aleksandr Likhachyov	22 July 1996 (aged 17)			(Russian Football Union) Spartak Moscow
15	MF	Anatolie Nikolaesh	17 April 1996 (aged 17)			(Russian Football Union) CSKA Moscow
16	GK	Igor Obukhov	29 May 1996 (aged 17)			(Russian Football Union) Zenit Saint Petersburg
17	DF	Ivan Frolov	16 January 1996 (aged 17)			(Russian Football Union) CSKA Moscow
18	MF	Ilmir Nurisov	5 August 1996 (aged 17)			(Russian Football Union) Chertanovo Moscow
19	MF	**Rifat Zhemaletdinov**	20 September 1996 (aged 17)			(Russian Football Union) Lokomotiv Moscow
20	FW	Aleksei Gasilin	1 March 1996 (aged 17)			(Russian Football Union) Zenit Saint Petersburg
21	FW	Maksim Mayrovich	6 February 1996 (aged 17)			(Russian Football Union) Chertanovo Moscow

=== Japan ===
Head coach: Hirofumi Yoshitake

No.	Pos.	Player	Date of birth (age)	Caps	Goals	Club
1	GK	Timothy Shiraoka	8 September 1996 (aged 17)			(Japan Football Association) Sanfrecce Hiroshima
2	DF	Ryoma Ishida	21 June 1996 (aged 17)			(Japan Football Association) Júbilo Iwata
3	DF	Kazuya Miyahara	22 March 1996 (aged 17)			(Japan Football Association) Sanfrecce Hiroshima
4	MF	Tokuma Suzuki	12 March 1997 (aged 16)			(Japan Football Association) Maebashi Ikuei High School
5	DF	Rikiya Motegi	27 September 1996 (aged 17)			(Japan Football Association) Urawa Red Diamonds
6	FW	Masaomi Nakano	9 April 1996 (aged 17)			(Japan Football Association) Tokyo Verdy
7	MF	**Kyoga Nakamura**	25 April 1996 (aged 17)			(Japan Football Association) JEF United Chiba
8	FW	Taro Sugimoto	12 February 1996 (aged 17)			(Japan Football Association) Teikyo University Kani High School
9	FW	Hiroki Ogawa	23 February 1997 (aged 16)			(Japan Football Association) Urawa Reds
10	MF	Takuma Mizutani	24 April 1996 (aged 17)			(Japan Football Association) Shimizu S-Pulse
11	FW	Ryoma Watanabe	2 October 1996 (aged 17)			(Japan Football Association) Maebashi Ikuei High School
12	MF	**Koji Miyoshi**	26 March 1997 (aged 16)			(Japan Football Association) Kawasaki Frontale
13	DF	**Kento Misao**	16 April 1996 (aged 17)			(Japan Football Association) Tokyo Verdy
14	FW	Yushi Nagashima	12 July 1996 (aged 17)			(Japan Football Association) Kyoto Sanga
15	MF	Yuki Aizu	1 August 1996 (aged 17)			(Japan Football Association) Kashiwa Reysol
16	MF	Shota Saito	7 December 1996 (aged 16)			(Japan Football Association) Urawa Red Diamonds
17	FW	Kosei Uryu	8 January 1996 (aged 17)			(Japan Football Association) Chikuyo Gakuen High School
18	GK	Mizuki Hayashi	4 September 1996 (aged 17)			(Japan Football Association) Gamba Osaka
19	FW	Koki Sugimori	5 April 1997 (aged 16)			(Japan Football Association) Nagoya Grampus
20	DF	Daisuke Sakai	18 January 1997 (aged 16)			(Japan Football Association) Oita Trinita
21	GK	Koto Abe	1 August 1997 (aged 16)			(Japan Football Association) Albirex Niigata

== Group E ==
=== Canada ===
Head coach: Sean Fleming

No.	Pos.	Player	Date of birth (age)	Caps	Goals	Club
1	GK	Marco Carducci	24 September 1996 (aged 17)			(Canadian Soccer Association) Vancouver Whitecaps
2	DF	Mathieu Laurent	28 February 1996 (aged 17)			(Canadian Soccer Association) Mississauga Falcons
3	DF	Elias Roubos	28 February 1996 (aged 17)			(Canadian Soccer Association) Toronto FC
4	DF	Alex Comsia	1 August 1996 (aged 17)			(Canadian Soccer Association) Vancouver Whitecaps
5	FW	El Mehdi Ibn Brahim	6 June 1996 (aged 17)			(Canadian Soccer Association) Braves d'Ahuntsic
6	MF	**Nevello Yoseke**	17 March 1996 (aged 17)			(Canadian Soccer Association) Montreal Impact
7	MF	**Marco Bustos**	22 April 1996 (aged 17)			(Canadian Soccer Association) Vancouver Whitecaps
8	MF	José Manuel López	4 March 1996 (aged 17)			(Canadian Soccer Association) FC Edmonton
9	FW	**Jordan Hamilton**	17 March 1996 (aged 17)			(Canadian Soccer Association) Toronto FC
10	MF	Hanson Boakai	28 October 1996 (aged 16)			(Canadian Soccer Association) FC Edmonton
11	MF	Jordan Haynes	17 January 1996 (aged 17)			(Canadian Soccer Association) Vancouver Whitecaps
12	DF	Kevon Black	11 February 1996 (aged 17)			(Canadian Soccer Association) Toronto FC
13	DF	Eric Davies	28 March 1997 (aged 16)			(United States Soccer Federation) FC Dallas
14	FW	Andrew Gordon	12 March 1997 (aged 16)			(Canadian Soccer Association) Woodbridge Strikers
15	MF	Matthew Chow	11 February 1996 (aged 17)			(Canadian Soccer Association) Vancouver Whitecaps
16	MF	**Marco Domínguez**	25 February 1996 (aged 17)			(Canadian Soccer Association) Montreal Impact
17	MF	**Miki Cantave**	25 October 1996 (aged 16)			(Royal Spanish Football Federation) Getafe
18	GK	Daniel Milton	26 November 1996 (aged 16)			(The Football Association) Blackpool
19	MF	**Kianz Froese**	16 April 1996 (aged 17)			(Canadian Soccer Association) Vancouver Whitecaps
20	MF	**Ali Musse**	1 January 1996 (aged 17)			(Canadian Soccer Association) WSA Winnipeg
21	GK	Christian Kaiswatum	1 March 1997 (aged 16)			(Canadian Soccer Association) FC Edmonton

=== Austria ===
Head coach: Hermann Stadler

No.	Pos.	Player	Date of birth (age)	Caps	Goals	Club
1	GK	Marcel Hartl	22 July 1996 (aged 17)			(Austrian Football Association) Ried
2	MF	Michael Endlicher	24 November 1996 (aged 16)			(Austrian Football Association) Austria Wien
3	DF	Stefan Perić	13 February 1997 (aged 16)			(Austrian Football Association) Red Bull Salzburg
4	MF	Lucas Tursch	29 March 1996 (aged 17)			(Austrian Football Association) FAL Linz
5	DF	Michael Lercher	4 January 1996 (aged 17)			(German Football Association) Werder Bremen
6	DF	Manuel Haas	7 May 1996 (aged 17)			(Austrian Football Association) Red Bull Salzburg
7	FW	**Adrian Grbić**	4 August 1996 (aged 17)			(German Football Association) VfB Stuttgart
8	MF	Sascha Horvath	22 August 1996 (aged 17)			(Austrian Football Association) Austria Wien
9	FW	Tobias Pellegrini	3 April 1996 (aged 17)			(Austrian Football Association) FAL Linz
10	MF	**Valentino Lazaro**	24 March 1996 (aged 17)			(Austrian Football Association) Red Bull Salzburg
11	DF	Petar Gluhakovic	25 March 1996 (aged 17)			(Austrian Football Association) Austria Wien
12	GK	Lucas Bundschuh	9 April 1996 (aged 17)			(German Football Association) SC Freiburg
13	FW	Luca Mayr	6 April 1996 (aged 17)			(Austrian Football Association) Ried
14	DF	Marcel Probst	21 July 1996 (aged 17)			(Austrian Football Association) Red Bull Salzburg
15	DF	David Domej	8 January 1996 (aged 17)			(Austrian Football Association) Rapid Wien
16	FW	Marko Kvasina	20 December 1996 (aged 16)			(Austrian Football Association) Austria Wien
17	MF	Nikola Zivotic	26 January 1996 (aged 17)			(Austrian Football Association) Austria Wien
18	DF	Dominik Baumgartner	20 July 1996 (aged 17)			(Austrian Football Association) SV Horn
19	FW	Daniel Ripić	14 March 1996 (aged 17)			(Austrian Football Association) Red Bull Salzburg
20	MF	Edin Bahtić	14 July 1996 (aged 17)			(Austrian Football Association) Kapfenberger SV
21	GK	**Alexander Schlager**	1 February 1996 (aged 17)			(Austrian Football Association) Red Bull Salzburg

=== Iran ===
Head coach: Ali Doustimehr

No.	Pos.	Player	Date of birth (age)	Caps	Goals	Club
1	GK	Mehdi Amini	16 May 1996 (aged 17)			(Football Federation Islamic Republic of Iran) Sepahan
2	DF	Mostafa Hashemi	19 October 1996 (aged 16)			(Football Federation Islamic Republic of Iran) Danesh Fereydon Kenar
3	DF	Sasan Jafari	17 September 1996 (aged 17)			(Football Federation Islamic Republic of Iran) Foolad
4	DF	Komeil Haghzadeh	25 February 1997 (aged 16)			(Football Federation Islamic Republic of Iran) Foolad
5	DF	**Majid Hosseini**	20 June 1996 (aged 17)			(Football Federation Islamic Republic of Iran) Saipa
6	MF	**Saeid Ezatolahi**	1 October 1996 (aged 17)			(Football Federation Islamic Republic of Iran) Malavan
7	FW	Mostafa Zakariapour	7 October 1997 (aged 16)			(Football Federation Islamic Republic of Iran) Zob Ahan
8	MF	Mohammad Bazaj	30 March 1996 (aged 17)			(Football Federation Islamic Republic of Iran) Sepahan
9	FW	Amir Mohammad Mazloum	27 January 1996 (aged 17)			(Football Federation Islamic Republic of Iran) Damash
10	MF	Amir Hossein Karimi	9 February 1996 (aged 17)			(Football Federation Islamic Republic of Iran) Sepahan
11	FW	Reza Jafari	11 January 1997 (aged 16)			(Football Federation Islamic Republic of Iran) Moghavemat Tehran
12	GK	Ahmad Gohari	12 January 1996 (aged 17)			(Football Federation Islamic Republic of Iran) Parseh Tehran
13	DF	**Iman Salimi**	1 June 1996 (aged 17)			(Football Federation Islamic Republic of Iran) Aluminium Hormozgan
14	MF	**Ali Gholizadeh**	10 March 1996 (aged 17)			(Football Federation Islamic Republic of Iran) Saipa
15	MF	Hossein Mehraban	12 May 1996 (aged 17)			(Football Federation Islamic Republic of Iran) Tablighat Asar
16	MF	Abdolreza Zarei	21 January 1996 (aged 17)			(Football Federation Islamic Republic of Iran) Fajr Sepasi
17	MF	Ali Hazami	25 February 1996 (aged 17)			(Football Federation Islamic Republic of Iran) Foolad
18	MF	**Sadegh Moharrami**	1 March 1996 (aged 17)			(Football Federation Islamic Republic of Iran) Malavan
19	MF	Yousef Seyedi	8 March 1996 (aged 17)			(Football Federation Islamic Republic of Iran) Zob Ahan Ardabil
20	MF	Mohammadreza Kaveh	22 July 1997 (aged 16)			(Football Federation Islamic Republic of Iran) Pishghaman
21	GK	Armin Hashemi	4 February 1996 (aged 17)			(Football Federation Islamic Republic of Iran) Nassaji Mazandaran

=== Argentina ===
Head coach: Humberto Grondona

No.	Pos.	Player	Date of birth (age)	Caps	Goals	Club
1	GK	Augusto Batalla	30 April 1996 (aged 17)			(Argentine Football Association) River Plate
2	DF	**Emanuel Mammana**	10 February 1996 (aged 17)			(Argentine Football Association) River Plate
3	DF	Nicolás Pinto	22 January 1996 (aged 17)			(Argentine Football Association) Boca Juniors
4	DF	Nicolás Tripichio	5 January 1996 (aged 17)			(Argentine Football Association) Vélez Sarsfield
5	MF	Germán Ferreyra	13 January 1996 (aged 17)			(Argentine Football Association) Vélez Sarsfield
6	DF	Leandro Vega	27 May 1996 (aged 17)			(Argentine Football Association) River Plate
7	FW	Jonathan Cañete	12 July 1996 (aged 17)			(Argentine Football Association) Independiente
8	MF	Marcelo Storm	26 June 1996 (aged 17)			(Argentine Football Association) Vélez Sarsfield
9	FW	Sebastián Driussi	9 February 1996 (aged 17)			(Argentine Football Association) River Plate
10	MF	Leonardo Suárez	30 March 1996 (aged 17)			(Argentine Football Association) Boca Juniors
11	MF	Marcos Astina	21 January 1996 (aged 17)			(Argentine Football Association) Lanús
12	GK	Axel Werner	28 February 1996 (aged 17)			(Argentine Football Association) Atlético de Rafaela
13	MF	**Cristian Pavon**	21 January 1996 (aged 17)			(Argentine Football Association) Talleres
14	MF	Lucio Compagnucci	23 February 1996 (aged 17)			(Argentine Football Association) Vélez Sarsfield
15	DF	Rodrigo Moreira	15 July 1996 (aged 17)			(Argentine Football Association) Independiente
16	MF	Zacarías Morán	22 February 1996 (aged 17)			(Argentine Football Association) River Plate
17	DF	Joaquín Ibañez	5 September 1996 (aged 17)			(Argentine Football Association) Lanús
18	MF	Luis Leszczuk	20 February 1996 (aged 17)			(Argentine Football Association) Boca Juniors
19	FW	Franco Pérez	1 January 1996 (aged 17)			(Argentine Football Association) Newell's Old Boys
20	MF	Matías Sánchez	5 July 1996 (aged 17)			(Argentine Football Association) Chacarita Juniors
21	GK	Fernando Benvenutti	3 May 1996 (aged 17)			(Argentine Football Association) Arsenal

== Group F ==
=== Mexico ===
Head coach: Raúl Gutiérrez

No.	Pos.	Player	Date of birth (age)	Caps	Goals	Club
1	GK	**Raúl Gudiño**	22 April 1996 (aged 17)			(Mexican Football Federation) Guadalajara
2	DF	Francisco Calderón	29 May 1996 (aged 17)			(Mexican Football Federation) UNAM
3	DF	Salomón Wbias	9 March 1996 (aged 17)			(Mexican Football Federation) Pachuca
4	DF	Pedro Terán	24 July 1996 (aged 17)			(Mexican Football Federation) Atlas
5	DF	**Osvaldo Rodríguez**	10 September 1996 (aged 17)			(Mexican Football Federation) Pachuca
6	MF	Erich Hernández	16 March 1996 (aged 17)			(Mexican Football Federation) Guadalajara
7	MF	Luis Enrique Hernández	10 February 1996 (aged 17)			(Mexican Football Federation) Pachuca
8	MF	José Almanza	24 February 1996 (aged 17)			(Mexican Football Federation) Pachuca
9	FW	Alejandro Díaz	27 January 1996 (aged 17)			(Mexican Football Federation) América
10	FW	Marco Granados	29 September 1996 (aged 17)			(Mexican Football Federation) Guadalajara
11	MF	Iván Ochoa	13 August 1996 (aged 17)			(Mexican Football Federation) Pachuca
12	GK	Edson Reséndez	12 January 1996 (aged 17)			(Mexican Football Federation) Monterrey
13	DF	José Robles	16 July 1996 (aged 17)			(Mexican Football Federation) UNAM
14	DF	**Érick Aguirre**	23 February 1997 (aged 16)			(Mexican Football Federation) Morelia
15	DF	Christian Tovar	13 January 1996 (aged 17)			(Mexican Football Federation) Santos Laguna
16	MF	Ulises Rivas	25 January 1996 (aged 17)			(Mexican Football Federation) Santos Laguna
17	MF	Jonh González	30 August 1996 (aged 17)			(Mexican Football Federation) América
18	MF	**Omar Govea**	18 January 1996 (aged 17)			(Mexican Football Federation) América
19	FW	Ulises Jaimes	20 April 1996 (aged 17)			(Mexican Football Federation) Morelia
20	FW	Víctor Zúñiga	21 March 1996 (aged 17)			(Mexican Football Federation) Cruz Azul
21	GK	Antonio Torres	23 May 1996 (aged 17)			(Mexican Football Federation) Chivas Guadalajara

=== Nigeria ===
Head coach: Manu Garba

No.	Pos.	Player	Date of birth (age)	Caps	Goals	Club
1	GK	**Dele Alampasu**	24 December 1996 (aged 16)			(Nigeria Football Federation) Football College Academy
2	DF	**Musa Muhammed**	31 October 1996 (aged 16)			(Nigeria Football Federation) FC Heart Academy
3	DF	Samuel Okon	15 December 1996 (aged 16)			(Nigeria Football Federation) Greater Tomorrow Academy
4	MF	Akinjide Idowu	9 September 1996 (aged 17)			(Nigeria Football Federation) Nath Boys Academy
5	DF	Denis Nya	1 December 1996 (aged 16)			(Nigeria Football Federation) Canaan Football Academy
6	DF	Aliyu Abubakar	15 June 1996 (aged 17)			(Nigeria Football Federation) Mutunchi Academy
7	MF	Habib Makanjuola	19 April 1999 (aged 14)			(The Football Association) Chelsea
8	MF	Abdullahi Alfa	29 July 1996 (aged 17)			(Nigeria Football Federation) Football College Academy
9	FW	**Isaac Success**	7 January 1996 (aged 17)			(Nigeria Football Federation) BJ Foundation Academy
10	FW	**Kelechi Iheanacho**	3 October 1996 (aged 17)			(Nigeria Football Federation) Taye Academy
11	MF	Musa Yahaya	16 December 1997 (aged 15)			(Nigeria Football Federation) Mutunchi Academy
12	MF	Chigozi Obasi	15 June 1998 (aged 15)			(Nigeria Football Federation) Fosla Academy
13	MF	**Saviour Godwin**	22 August 1996 (aged 17)			(Nigeria Football Federation) El-Kadme Academy
14	DF	Chidiebere Nwakali	26 December 1996 (aged 16)			(Nigeria Football Federation) Shuttle Spots Academy
15	DF	Raymond Japhet	28 May 1997 (aged 16)			(Nigeria Football Federation) NFF U-15
16	GK	Abdulazeez Abubakar	20 July 1999 (aged 14)			(Nigeria Football Federation) Nath Boys Academy
17	FW	Chidera Ezeh	2 October 1997 (aged 16)			(Nigeria Football Federation) River Lane Academy
18	FW	**Taiwo Awoniyi**	12 August 1997 (aged 16)			(Nigeria Football Federation) Imperial Academy
19	DF	Zaharaddeen Bello	21 December 1997 (aged 15)			(Nigeria Football Federation) Dabo Babes Academy
20	MF	Baba Salihu	10 August 1997 (aged 16)			(Nigeria Football Federation) Rangers Academy Bida
21	GK	**Francis Uzoho**	28 October 1998 (aged 14)			(Qatar Football Association) Aspire Academy

=== Iraq ===
Head coach: Muwafaq Hussein

No.	Pos.	Player	Date of birth (age)	Caps	Goals	Club
1	GK	Haidar Faisal	23 October 1996 (aged 16)			(Iraq Football Association) Al-Quwa Al-Jawiya
2	DF	**Alaa Mhawi**	3 June 1996 (aged 17)			(Iraq Football Association) Al-Kahraba
3	DF	Ahmad Nadhim	10 July 1996 (aged 17)			(Iraq Football Association) Al-Quwa Al-Jawiya
4	DF	Mahdi Abdul-Zahra	17 March 1996 (aged 17)			(Iraq Football Association) Al-Kahraba
5	DF	Mustafa Sameer	29 September 1996 (aged 17)			(Iraq Football Association) Al-Kahraba
6	DF	**Ali Qasim**	5 March 1996 (aged 17)			(Iraq Football Association) Al-Mina'a
7	FW	**Sherko Karim**	25 May 1996 (aged 17)			(Iraq Football Association) Al-Shorta
8	MF	**Bashar Resan**	22 December 1996 (aged 16)			(Iraq Football Association) Al-Quwa Al-Jawiya
9	MF	Amjad Khairi	16 June 1996 (aged 17)			(Iraq Football Association) Al-Quwa Al-Jawiya
10	MF	Mohammed Salam Enad	6 February 1996 (aged 17)			(Iraq Football Association) Al-Kahraba
11	MF	**Amjad Attwan**	12 March 1997 (aged 16)			(Iraq Football Association) Naft Maysan
12	MF	Ali Essam	26 November 1996 (aged 16)			(Iraq Football Association) Diyala
13	MF	Yassir Ammar	31 January 1997 (aged 16)			(Iraq Football Association) Al-Kahraba
14	FW	Ahmad Abdul-Abbas	28 April 1996 (aged 17)			(Iraq Football Association) Al-Quwa Al-Jawiya
15	DF	Ali Saleh Mahdi	6 August 1996 (aged 17)			(Iraq Football Association) Al-Sinaa
16	MF	Fahad Hameed	2 August 1996 (aged 17)			(Iraq Football Association) Al-Sinaa
17	FW	**Sajad Hussein**	9 September 1998 (aged 15)			(Iraq Football Association) Baghdad
18	MF	Samer Majed Abdul-Malek	15 June 1996 (aged 17)			(Iraq Football Association) Al-Zawra'a
19	DF	**Mustafa Maan**	15 January 1997 (aged 16)			(Iraq Football Association) Al-Talaba
20	GK	Mohammed Shaker Mahmoud	28 September 1996 (aged 17)			(Iraq Football Association) Diyala
21	GK	Alaa Qasim	10 November 1996 (aged 16)			(Iraq Football Association) Naft Maysan

=== Sweden ===
Head coach: Roland Larsson

No.	Pos.	Player	Date of birth (age)	Caps	Goals	Club
1	GK	**Sixten Mohlin**	17 January 1996 (aged 17)			(Swedish Football Association) Malmö FF
2	DF	Jakob Bergman	2 January 1996 (aged 17)			(Swedish Football Association) IFK Göteborg
3	DF	Ali Suljić	18 September 1997 (aged 16)			(Swedish Football Association) Motala AIF
4	DF	Sebastian Ramhorn	3 May 1996 (aged 17)			(Swedish Football Association) Kalmar FF
5	DF	Johan Ramhorn	3 May 1996 (aged 17)			(Swedish Football Association) Kalmar FF
6	DF	**Noah Sonko Sundberg**	6 June 1996 (aged 17)			(Swedish Football Association) AIK
7	DF	**Linus Wahlqvist**	11 November 1996 (aged 16)			(Swedish Football Association) IFK Norrköping
8	MF	**Elias Andersson**	31 January 1996 (aged 17)			(Swedish Football Association) Helsingborgs IF
9	FW	Valmir Berisha	6 June 1996 (aged 17)			(Swedish Football Association) Halmstads BK
10	MF	**Erdal Rakip**	13 February 1996 (aged 17)			(Swedish Football Association) Malmö FF
11	MF	**Anton Salétros**	12 April 1996 (aged 17)			(Swedish Football Association) AIK
12	GK	Hampus Strömgren	8 July 1996 (aged 17)			(Swedish Football Association) Mjällby AIF
13	MF	Viktor Nordin	18 January 1996 (aged 17)			(Swedish Football Association) Hammarby IF
14	MF	Isak Ssewankambo	27 February 1996 (aged 17)			(The Football Association) Chelsea
15	FW	Gentrit Citaku	25 February 1996 (aged 17)			(Swedish Football Association) IFK Norrköping
16	FW	**Gustav Engvall**	29 April 1996 (aged 17)			(Swedish Football Association) IFK Göteborg
17	FW	Mirza Halvadžić	15 February 1996 (aged 17)			(Swedish Football Association) Malmö FF
18	FW	Christer Lipovac	7 March 1996 (aged 17)			(Swedish Football Association) Karlslunds IF
19	DF	Linus Fridolf	14 January 1996 (aged 17)			(Swedish Football Association) Trelleborgs FF
20	FW	Carlos Strandberg	14 April 1996 (aged 17)			(Swedish Football Association) BK Häcken
21	GK	Tim Erlandsson	25 December 1996 (aged 16)			(Swedish Football Association) Halmstads BK
