= 2013 FIFA U-17 World Cup =

كأس العالم تحت 17 سنة لكرة القدم 2013

Tournament details
- Host country: United Arab Emirates
- Dates: 17 October – 8 November
- Teams: 24 (from 6 confederations)
- Venues: 6 (in 6 host cities)

Final positions
- Champions: Nigeria (4th title)
- Runners-up: Mexico
- Third place: Sweden
- Fourth place: Argentina

Tournament statistics
- Matches played: 52
- Goals scored: 172 (3.31 per match)
- Attendance: 318,108 (6,117 per match)
- Top scorer: (Sweden) Valmir Berisha (7 goals)
- Best player: (Nigeria) Kelechi Iheanacho
- Best goalkeeper: (Nigeria) Dele Alampasu
- Fair play award: Nigeria

The 2013 FIFA U-17 World Cup was the fifteenth tournament of the FIFA U-17 World Cup. The tournament was held in the United Arab Emirates from 17 October to 8 November. Nigeria won the tournament after defeating Mexico 3–0 in the final, claiming the country's fourth title. Sweden won the bronze with a 4–1 victory over Argentina in the third-place play-off match.

Players born after 1 January 1996 could participate in this tournament.

== Bids ==
There were two official bids:

- United Arab Emirates
- Ghana

== Venues ==
In June 2012, FIFA selected the Sheikh Khalifa International Stadium in Al Ain, the Al Nahyan Stadium in Abu Dhabi, the Al-Rashid Stadium in Dubai, the Emirates Club Stadium in Ras al-Khaimah and the Fujairah Club Stadium in the state of Fujairah as venues. The use of Sharjah Stadium in Sharjah was initially proposed, and it was finally selected as a venue, in September 2012. Mohammed Bin Zayed Stadium replaced Al Nahyan Stadium of Abu Dhabi and hosted the final.

Dubai	Ras al-Khaimah	Fujairah
Al-Rashid Stadium	Emirates Club Stadium	Fujairah Club Stadium
Capacity: 18,000	Capacity: 3,000	Capacity: 5,000
Location of the host cities of the 2013 FIFA U-17 World Cup.
Abu Dhabi	Al Ain	Sharjah
Mohammed Bin Zayed Stadium	Sheikh Khalifa International Stadium	Sharjah Stadium
Capacity: 42,056	Capacity: 16,000	Capacity: 12,000

== Teams ==
In addition to host nation United Arab Emirates, 23 nations qualified from six separate continental competitions.

Confederation	Qualifying Tournament	Venue	Qualifier(s)
AFC (Asia)	Host nation		United Arab Emirates
AFC (Asia)	2012 AFC U-16 Championship	Iran	Iran; Iraq^{1} Japan; Uzbekistan
CAF (Africa)	2013 African U-17 Championship	Morocco	Côte d'Ivoire; Morocco^{1} Nigeria; Tunisia
CONCACAF (Central, North America and Caribbean)	2013 CONCACAF U-17 Championship	Panama	Canada; Honduras; Mexico; Panama
CONMEBOL (South America)	2013 South American Under-17 Football Championship	Argentina	Argentina; Brazil; Uruguay; Venezuela^{1}
OFC (Oceania)	2013 OFC U-17 Championship	Vanuatu	New Zealand
UEFA (Europe)	2013 UEFA European Under-17 Championship	Slovakia	Austria; Croatia; Italy; Russia^{2} Slovakia^{3} Sweden^{1}

1.Teams that made their debut.
2. This is the debut of 'Russia' as a nation since the cessation of the USSR in 1991.
3. This is the debut of 'Slovakia' as a nation since the cessation of Czechoslovakia in 1993.

== Match officials ==
Confederation	Referee	Assistants
AFC	Khalil Al-Ghamdi (Saudi Arabia)	Badr Al-Shumrani (Saudi Arabia); Hamad Al-Mayahi (Oman)
AFC	Kim Dong-Jin (South Korea)	Jeong Hae-Sang (South Korea); Yang Byoung-Eun (South Korea)
AFC	Abdulrahman Abdou (Qatar)	Taleb Al-Marri (Qatar); Yaser Marad (Kuwait)
CAF	Badara Diatta (Senegal)	Djibril Camara (Senegal); El Hadji Samba (Senegal)
CAF	Daniel Bennett (South Africa)	Zakhele Siwela (South Africa); Aden Marwa (Kenya)
CAF	Slim Jedidi (Tunisia)	Bechir Hassani (Tunisia); Anouar Hmila (Tunisia)
CONCACAF	Elmer Bonilla (El Salvador)	Octavio Jarra (Costa Rica); Hermenerito Leal (Guatemala)
CONCACAF	Marco Rodríguez (Mexico)	Marcos Quintero (Mexico); Marvin Torrentera (Mexico)
CONCACAF	Jair Marrufo (United States)	Eric Boria (United States); Ricardo Morgan (Jamaica)
CONMEBOL	Néstor Pitana (Argentina)	Juan Pablo Belatti (Argentina); Diego Bonfá (Argentina)
CONMEBOL	Raúl Orosco (Bolivia)	Efraín Castro (Bolivia); Arol Valda (Bolivia)
CONMEBOL	Héber Lopes (Brazil)	Alessandro Rocha (Brazil); Marcelo van Gasse (Brazil)
CONMEBOL	Martín Vázquez (Uruguay)	Nicolas Tarán (Uruguay); Miguel Nievas (Uruguay)
CONMEBOL	Juan Soto (Venezuela)	Jorge Urrego (Venezuela); Carlos López Rico (Venezuela)
OFC	Norbert Hauata (Tahiti)	Mark Rule (New Zealand); Tevita Makasini (Tonga)
UEFA	Pavel Královec (Czech Republic)	Martin Wilczek (Czech Republic); Roman Slyško (Slovakia)
UEFA	Mark Clattenburg (England)	Stephen Child (England); Simon Beck (England)
UEFA	Wolfgang Stark (Germany)	Jan-Hendrik Salver (Germany); Mike Pickel (Germany)
UEFA	Gianluca Rocchi (Italy)	Elenito Di Liberatore (Italy); Gianluca Cariolato (Italy)
UEFA	Svein Oddvar Moen (Norway)	Frank Andås (Norway); Kim Haglund (Norway)
UEFA	Craig Thomson (Scotland)	Derek Rose (Scotland); Alan Mulvanny (Scotland)

== Squads ==
Teams had to name a 21-man squad (three of whom must be goalkeepers) by the FIFA deadline.

== Draw ==
The final draw for group stage was held on 26 August 2013 in Abu Dhabi at the Bab Al Bahr Hotel at 19:00 (local time).

Prior to the draw, FIFA announced that as host, the United Arab Emirates would be placed as 'A1', to assist with ticket sales. The continental champions of the confederations AFC, CAF, CONCACAF, CONMEBOL, and UEFA are assigned to the other five groups. Teams from the same confederation cannot be drawn against each other at the group stage.

Pot 1	Pot 2	Pot 3	Pot 4
United Arab Emirates (assigned to Group A); Iran; Iraq; Japan; Uzbekistan (assigned to Group C); New Zealand	Argentina (assigned to Group E); Brazil; Uruguay; Venezuela; Mexico (assigned to Group F); Panama	Canada; Honduras; Côte d'Ivoire (assigned to Group B); Morocco; Nigeria; Tunisia	Austria; Croatia; Italy; Russia (assigned to Group D); Slovakia; Sweden

== Logo and tickets ==
The logo of the competition was unveiled on 5 March 2013, including the local organising committee asking Omar Abdulrahman to be a 'brand ambassador' for this event.

'Stadium package' tickets for the Tournament went on sale on 26 June, with the ability to buy tickets per match once the draw has been made.

A falcon known as 'Shaqran' will be the mascot for the World Cup, after being introduced to local journalists on 13 May .

== Group stage ==
The winners and runners-up from each group, as well as the best four third-placed teams, qualified for the first round of the knockout stage (round of 16).

The ranking of each team in each group is determined as follows:

1. points obtained in all group matches;
2. goal difference in all group matches;
3. number of goals scored in all group matches;

If two or more teams are equal on the basis of the above three criteria, their rankings are determined as follows:

1. points obtained in the group matches between the teams concerned;
2. goal difference in the group matches between the teams concerned;
3. number of goals scored in the group matches between the teams concerned;
4. drawing of lots by the FIFA Organising Committee.

All times are local, UTC+04:00.

=== Group A ===
Pos	Team	Pld	W	D	L	GF	GA	GD	Pts	Group stage result
1	Brazil	3	3	0	0	15	2	+13	9	Advanced to knockout stage
2	Honduras	3	1	1	1	4	6	−2	4	Advanced to knockout stage
3	Slovakia	3	1	1	1	5	8	−3	4	Advanced to knockout stage
4	United Arab Emirates (H)	3	0	0	3	2	10	−8	0	

Source: RSSSF
(H) Hosts
17 October 2013
17:00

Brazil	6–1	Slovakia
Mosquito 17', 30' (pen.), 70'; Nathan 45+2', 51'; Caio 56'	Report	Vavro 68'

Mohammed Bin Zayed Stadium, Abu Dhabi
Attendance: 8,650
Referee: Marco Rodríguez (Mexico)

17 October 2013
20:00

United Arab Emirates	1–2	Honduras
Khalfan 33'	Report	Medina 20'; Velásquez 86'

Mohammed Bin Zayed Stadium, Abu Dhabi
Attendance: 8,650
Referee: Gianluca Rocchi (Italy)

20 October 2013
17:00

Slovakia	2–2	Honduras
Vestenický 48', 57'	Report	Flores 20'; Bodden 90+2'

Mohammed Bin Zayed Stadium, Abu Dhabi
Attendance: 8,200
Referee: Abdulrahman Abdou (Qatar)

20 October 2013
20:00

United Arab Emirates	1–6	Brazil
Al-Ameri 89'	Report	Boschilia 10', 33'; Nathan 41', 66'; Joanderson 73'; Gabriel 84'

Mohammed Bin Zayed Stadium, Abu Dhabi
Attendance: 8,200
Referee: Mark Clattenburg (England)

23 October 2013
20:00

Slovakia	2–0	United Arab Emirates
Vestenický 36', 58'	Report

Mohammed Bin Zayed Stadium, Abu Dhabi
Attendance: 3,642
Referee: Juan Soto (Venezuela)

23 October 2013
20:00

Honduras	0–3	Brazil
	Report	Boschilia 14', 45'; Caio 64'

Emirates Club Stadium, Ras al-Khaimah
Attendance: 2,662
Referee: Wolfgang Stark (Germany)

=== Group B ===
Pos	Team	Pld	W	D	L	GF	GA	GD	Pts	Group stage result
1	Uruguay	3	2	1	0	10	2	+8	7	Advanced to knockout stage
2	Italy	3	2	0	1	3	2	+1	6	Advanced to knockout stage
3	Ivory Coast	3	1	1	1	4	2	+2	4	Advanced to knockout stage
4	New Zealand	3	0	0	3	0	11	−11	0	

Source: RSSSF
17 October 2013
17:00

Uruguay	7–0	New Zealand
Méndez 3'; Otormín 37', 63'; Acosta 49', 57'; Ospitaleche 75'; Pizzichillo 89'	Report

Emirates Club Stadium, Ras al-Khaimah
Attendance: 1,201
Referee: Wolfgang Stark (Germany)

17 October 2013
20:00

Côte d'Ivoire	0–1	Italy
	Report	Vido 46'

Emirates Club Stadium, Ras al-Khaimah
Attendance: 1,201
Referee: Néstor Pitana (Argentina)

20 October 2013
17:00

Uruguay	1–1	Côte d'Ivoire
Acosta 90+4'	Report	Keita 17'

Emirates Club Stadium, Ras al-Khaimah
Attendance: 2,482
Referee: Craig Thomson (Scotland)

20 October 2013
20:00

Italy	1–0	New Zealand
Vido 48'	Report

Emirates Club Stadium, Ras al-Khaimah
Attendance: 2,482
Referee: Elmer Bonilla (El Salvador)

23 October 2013
17:00

New Zealand	0–3	Côte d'Ivoire
	Report	Bakayoko 25', 48'; Meïté 87'

Mohammed Bin Zayed Stadium, Abu Dhabi
Attendance: 3,642
Referee: Abdulrahman Abdou (Qatar)

23 October 2013
17:00

Italy	1–2	Uruguay
Parigini 10'	Report	Bregonis 15'; Benítez 64'

Emirates Club Stadium, Ras al-Khaimah
Attendance: 2,662
Referee: Khalil Al-Ghamdi (Saudi Arabia)

=== Group C ===
Pos	Team	Pld	W	D	L	GF	GA	GD	Pts	Group stage result
1	Morocco	3	2	1	0	7	3	+4	7	Advanced to knockout stage
2	Uzbekistan	3	2	1	0	4	1	+3	7	Advanced to knockout stage
3	Croatia	3	1	0	2	3	5	−2	3	
4	Panama	3	0	0	3	2	7	−5	0	

Source: RSSSF
18 October 2013
17:00

Croatia	1–3	Morocco
Murić 59'	Report	Achahbar 27', 40'; Jaadi 45'

Fujairah Club Stadium, Fujairah
Attendance: 4,296
Referee: Jair Marrufo (United States)

18 October 2013
20:00

Panama	0–2	Uzbekistan
	Report	Abbasov 68'; Ashurmatov 76'

Fujairah Club Stadium, Fujairah
Attendance: 4,296
Referee: Daniel Bennett (South Africa)

21 October 2013
17:00

Croatia	1–0	Panama
Roguljić 26'	Report

Fujairah Club Stadium, Fujairah
Attendance: 5,093
Referee: Norbert Hauata (Tahiti)

21 October 2013
20:00

Uzbekistan	0–0	Morocco
	Report

Fujairah Club Stadium, Fujairah
Attendance: 5,093
Referee: Raúl Orosco (Bolivia)

24 October 2013
20:00

Uzbekistan	2–1	Croatia
Ćaleta-Car 14' (o.g.); Boltaboev 79'	Report	Halilović 27'

Fujairah Club Stadium, Fujairah
Attendance: 2,425
Referee: Elmer Bonilla (El Salvador)

24 October 2013
20:00

Morocco	4–2	Panama
Bnou Marzouk 30', 40'; Sakhi 49'; Achahbar 85'	Report	Wald 20'; Zorrilla 88'

Sharjah Stadium, Sharjah
Attendance: 5,183
Referee: Pavel Královec (Czech Republic)

=== Group D ===
Pos	Team	Pld	W	D	L	GF	GA	GD	Pts	Group stage result
1	Japan	3	3	0	0	6	2	+4	9	Advanced to knockout stage
2	Tunisia	3	2	0	1	4	3	+1	6	Advanced to knockout stage
3	Russia	3	1	0	2	4	2	+2	3	Advanced to knockout stage
4	Venezuela	3	0	0	3	2	9	−7	0	

Source: RSSSF
18 October 2013
17:00

Tunisia	2–1	Venezuela
Jbeli 25'; Ben Larbi 47' (pen.)	Report	Márquez 51'

Sharjah Stadium, Sharjah
Attendance: 3,135
Referee: Khalil Al-Ghamdi (Saudi Arabia)

18 October 2013
20:00

Russia	0–1	Japan
	Report	Uryu 15'

Sharjah Stadium, Sharjah
Attendance: 3,135
Referee: Héber Lopes (Brazil)

21 October 2013
17:00

Tunisia	1–0	Russia
Gabsi 61'	Report

Sharjah Stadium, Sharjah
Attendance: 3,370
Referee: Kim Dong-Jin (South Korea)

21 October 2013
20:00

Japan	3–1	Venezuela
Sugimoto 7'; Watanabe 44', 78' (pen.)	Report	Caraballo 17'

Sharjah Stadium, Sharjah
Attendance: 3,370
Referee: Badara Diatta (Senegal)

24 October 2013
17:00

Venezuela	0–4	Russia
	Report	A. Makarov 16'; Sheydayev 39', 85'; Golovin 45+2'

Fujairah Club Stadium, Fujairah
Attendance: 2,425
Referee: Daniel Bennett (South Africa)

24 October 2013
17:00

Japan	2–1	Tunisia
Sakai 87'; Watanabe 90+3'	Report	Dräger 45+2'

Sharjah Stadium, Sharjah
Attendance: 5,183
Referee: Norbert Hauata (Tahiti)

=== Group E ===
Pos	Team	Pld	W	D	L	GF	GA	GD	Pts	Group stage result
1	Argentina	3	2	1	0	7	3	+4	7	Advanced to knockout stage
2	Iran	3	1	2	0	3	2	+1	5	Advanced to knockout stage
3	Canada	3	0	2	1	3	6	−3	2	
4	Austria	3	0	1	2	4	6	−2	1	

Source: RSSSF
19 October 2013
17:00

Canada	2–2	Austria
Hamilton 53'; Roubos 58' (pen.)	Report	Horvath 28'; Zivotic 61'

Al-Rashid Stadium, Dubai
Attendance: 5,952
Referee: Slim Jedidi (Tunisia)

19 October 2013
20:00

Iran	1–1	Argentina
M. Hashemi 1'	Report	Driussi 15'

Al-Rashid Stadium, Dubai
Attendance: 5,952
Referee: Pavel Královec (Czech Republic)

22 October 2013
17:00

Canada	1–1	Iran
Hamilton 48'	Report	Karimi 7'

Al-Rashid Stadium, Dubai
Attendance: 9,135
Referee: Héber Lopes (Brazil)

22 October 2013
20:00

Argentina	3–2	Austria
Ibáñez 42'; Ferreyra 51'; Suárez 88'	Report	Zivotic 31'; Pellegrini 79'

Al-Rashid Stadium, Dubai
Attendance: 9,135
Referee: Jair Marrufo (United States)

25 October 2013
20:00

Argentina	3–0	Canada
Ibáñez 45+1'; Sánchez 46', 75'	Report

Al-Rashid Stadium, Dubai
Attendance: 10,120
Referee: Mark Clattenburg (England)

25 October 2013
20:00

Austria	0–1	Iran
	Report	Seyyedi 36'

Sheikh Khalifa International Stadium, Al Ain
Attendance: 8,179
Referee: Raúl Orosco (Bolivia)

=== Group F ===
Pos	Team	Pld	W	D	L	GF	GA	GD	Pts	Group stage result
1	Nigeria	3	2	1	0	14	4	+10	7	Advanced to knockout stage
2	Mexico	3	2	0	1	5	7	−2	6	Advanced to knockout stage
3	Sweden	3	1	1	1	7	5	+2	4	Advanced to knockout stage
4	Iraq	3	0	0	3	2	12	−10	0	

Source: RSSSF
19 October 2013
17:00

Mexico	1–6	Nigeria
Jaimes 41'	Report	Iheanacho 33', 40', 49', 70'; Nwakali 52'; Success 60'

Sheikh Khalifa International Stadium, Al Ain
Attendance: 7,653
Referee: Svein Oddvar Moen (Norway)

19 October 2013
20:00

Iraq	1–4	Sweden
Salam 54'	Report	Engvall 37', 67'; Salétros 72'; Suljić 88'

Sheikh Khalifa International Stadium, Al Ain
Attendance: 7,653
Referee: Juan Soto (Venezuela)

22 October 2013
17:00

Mexico	3–1	Iraq
Díaz 31'; Almanza 41'; Rivas 84'	Report	Karim 61'

Sheikh Khalifa International Stadium, Al Ain
Attendance: 7,153
Referee: Slim Jedidi (Tunisia)

22 October 2013
20:00

Sweden	3–3	Nigeria
Berisha 11', 19'; Halvadzić 65'	Report	Success 22'; Yahaya 48'; Awoniyi 81'

Sheikh Khalifa International Stadium, Al Ain
Attendance: 7,153
Referee: Néstor Pitana (Argentina)

25 October 2013
17:00

Nigeria	5–0	Iraq
Muhammed 4' (pen.); Nwakali 4'; Yahaya 17', 41'; Obasi 90'	Report

Al-Rashid Stadium, Dubai
Attendance: 10,120
Referee: Gianluca Rocchi (Italy)

25 October 2013
17:00

Sweden	0–1	Mexico
	Report	Jaimes 86'

Sheikh Khalifa International Stadium, Al Ain
Attendance: 8,179
Referee: Kim Dong-Jin (South Korea)

=== Ranking of third-placed teams ===
The four best teams among those ranked third are determined as follows:

1. points obtained in all group matches;
2. goal difference in all group matches;
3. number of goals scored in all group matches;
4. drawing of lots by the FIFA Organising Committee.

Pos	Grp	Team	Pld	W	D	L	GF	GA	GD	Pts	Group stage result
1	F	Sweden	3	1	1	1	7	5	+2	4	Advanced to knockout stage
2	B	Côte d'Ivoire	3	1	1	1	4	2	+2	4	Advanced to knockout stage
3	A	Slovakia	3	1	1	1	5	8	−3	4	Advanced to knockout stage
4	D	Russia	3	1	0	2	4	2	+2	3	Advanced to knockout stage
5	C	Croatia	3	1	0	2	3	5	−2	3	
6	E	Canada	3	0	2	1	3	6	−3	2	

== Knockout stage ==
In the knockout stages, if a match is level at the end of normal playing time, no extra time will be played, with the match to be determined by a penalty shoot-out.

Round of 16
28 October — Sharjah
Honduras	1
Uzbekistan	0
28 October — Sharjah
Japan	1
Sweden	2
29 October — Ras al-Khaimah
Uruguay	4
Slovakia	2
29 October — Al Ain
Nigeria	4
Iran	1
29 October — Dubai
Argentina	3
Tunisia	1
29 October — Fujairah
Morocco	1
Ivory Coast	2
28 October — Abu Dhabi
Brazil	3
Russia	1
28 October — Abu Dhabi
Italy	0
Mexico	2

Quarter-finals
1 November — Al Ain
Honduras	1
Sweden	2
2 November — Sharjah
Uruguay	0
Nigeria	2
2 November — Sharjah
Argentina	2
Ivory Coast	1
1 November — Dubai
Brazil	1 (10)
Mexico (pen.)	1 (11)

Semi-finals
5 November — Dubai
Sweden	0
Nigeria	3
5 November — Abu Dhabi
Argentina	0
Mexico	3

Final
8 November — Abu Dhabi
Nigeria	3
Mexico	0
Third place
8 November — Abu Dhabi
Sweden	4
Argentina	1

=== Round of 16 ===
28 October 2013
17:00

Italy	0–2	Mexico
	Report	Díaz 26'; Ochoa 90+2'

Mohammed Bin Zayed Stadium, Abu Dhabi
Attendance: 4,624
Referee: Néstor Pitana (Argentina)

28 October 2013
17:00

Japan	1–2	Sweden
Wahlqvist 56' (o.g.)	Report	Berisha 11'; Engvall 36'

Sharjah Stadium, Sharjah
Attendance: 2,257
Referee: Badara Diatta (Senegal)

28 October 2013
20:00

Brazil	3–1	Russia
Mosquito 72'; Boschilia 80', 90+3'	Report	A. Makarov 90+1'

Mohammed Bin Zayed Stadium, Abu Dhabi
Attendance: 4,624
Referee: Khalil Al-Ghamdi (Saudi Arabia)

28 October 2013
20:00

Honduras	1–0	Uzbekistan
Bodden 74'	Report

Sharjah Stadium, Sharjah
Attendance: 2,257
Referee: Pavel Královec (Czech Republic)

29 October 2013
17:00

Uruguay	4–2	Slovakia
Otormín 5', 58'; Méndez 34' (pen.); Acosta 42'	Report	Vestenický 63'; Siplak 85'

Emirates Club Stadium, Ras al-Khaimah
Attendance: 2,215
Referee: Marco Rodríguez (Mexico)

29 October 2013
17:00

Morocco	1–2	Côte d'Ivoire
Bnou Marzouk 60'	Report	Kessié 4' (pen.); Ahissan 75'

Fujairah Club Stadium, Fujairah
Attendance: 4,172
Referee: Craig Thomson (Scotland)

29 October 2013
20:00

Argentina	3–1	Tunisia
Ferreyra 2'; Ibáñez 53'; Driussi 73'	Report	Haj Hassen 43'

Al-Rashid Stadium, Dubai
Attendance: 6,801
Referee: Svein Oddvar Moen (Norway)

29 October 2013
20:00

Nigeria	4–1	Iran
Okon 23'; Iheanacho 25'; Muhammed 42'; Yahaya 76'	Report	Gholizadeh 84'

Sheikh Khalifa International Stadium, Al Ain
Attendance: 6,825
Referee: Héber Lopes (Brazil)

=== Quarter-finals ===
1 November 2013
17:00

Honduras	1–2	Sweden
Velásquez 37'	Report	Rakip 68'; Berisha 74'

Sheikh Khalifa International Stadium, Al Ain
Attendance: 7,028
Referee: Abdulrahman Abdou (Qatar)

1 November 2013
20:00

Brazil	1–1	Mexico
Nathan 85'	Report	Ochoa 80'
Penalties
Mosquito (penalty scored); Nathan (penalty scored); Lucas (penalty scored); Danilo (penalty scored); Gabriel (penalty missed); Léo Pereira (penalty scored); Thiago Maia (penalty scored); Joanderson (penalty scored); Eduardo (penalty scored); Marcos (penalty scored); Auro Jr. (penalty scored); Mosquito (penalty missed)	10–11	(penalty scored) Díaz; (penalty scored) Ochoa; (penalty missed) Rivas; (penalty scored) Aguirre; (penalty scored) Wbias; (penalty scored) Granados; (penalty scored) Tovar; (penalty scored) Robles; (penalty scored) Govea; (penalty scored) Terán; (penalty scored) Gudiño; (penalty scored) Díaz

Al-Rashid Stadium, Dubai
Attendance: 9,210
Referee: Svein Oddvar Moen (Norway)

2 November 2013
17:00

Argentina	2–1	Côte d'Ivoire
Ibáñez 6'; Moreira 33'	Report	Kessié 78' (pen.)

Sharjah Stadium, Sharjah
Attendance: 8,288
Referee: Wolfgang Stark (Germany)

2 November 2013
20:00

Uruguay	0–2	Nigeria
	Report	Awoniyi 18', 79'

Sharjah Stadium, Sharjah
Attendance: 8,288
Referee: Jair Marrufo (United States)

=== Semi-finals ===
5 November 2013
17:00

Argentina	0–3	Mexico
	Report	Ochoa 5', 21'; Granados 86'

Mohammed Bin Zayed Stadium, Abu Dhabi
Attendance: 5,621
Referee: Gianluca Rocchi (Italy)

5 November 2013
20:00

Sweden	0–3	Nigeria
	Report	Awoniyi 21'; Okon 80'; Ezeh 81'

Al-Rashid Stadium, Dubai
Attendance: 8,800
Referee: Héber Lopes (Brazil)

=== Play-off for third place ===
8 November 2013
17:00

Sweden	4–1	Argentina
Berisha 7', 24', 57'; Strandberg 20'	Report	Compagnucci 44'

Mohammed Bin Zayed Stadium, Abu Dhabi
Attendance: 20,018
Referee: Badara Diatta (Senegal)

=== Final ===
8 November 2013
20:00

Nigeria	3–0	Mexico
Aguirre 9' (o.g.); Iheanacho 56'; Muhammed 81'	Report

Mohammed Bin Zayed Stadium, Abu Dhabi
Attendance: 20,018
Referee: Craig Thomson (Scotland)

== Awards ==
Golden Ball	Silver Ball	Bronze Ball
(Nigeria) Kelechi Iheanacho	(Brazil) Nathan	(Mexico) Iván Ochoa
Golden Boot	Silver Boot	Bronze Boot
(Sweden) Valmir Berisha	(Nigeria) Kelechi Iheanacho	(Brazil) Gabriel Boschilia
7 goals (0 assists)	6 goals (7 assists)	6 goals (3 assists)
Golden Glove
(Nigeria) Dele Alampasu
FIFA Fair Play Award
Nigeria

== Final ranking ==
Pos	Team	Pld	W	D	L	GF	GA	GD	Pts	Final result
1	Nigeria	7	6	1	0	26	5	+21	19	Champions
2	Mexico	7	4	1	2	11	11	0	13	Runners-up
3	Sweden	7	4	1	2	15	11	+4	13	Third place
4	Argentina	7	4	1	2	13	12	+1	13	Fourth place
5	Brazil	5	4	1	0	19	4	+15	13	Eliminated in Quarter-finals
6	Uruguay	5	3	1	1	14	6	+8	10	Eliminated in Quarter-finals
7	Ivory Coast	5	2	1	2	7	5	+2	7	Eliminated in Quarter-finals
8	Honduras	5	2	1	2	6	8	−2	7	Eliminated in Quarter-finals
9	Japan	4	3	0	1	7	4	+3	9	Eliminated in Round of 16
10	Morocco	4	2	1	1	8	5	+3	7	Eliminated in Round of 16
11	Uzbekistan	4	2	1	1	4	2	+2	7	Eliminated in Round of 16
12	Tunisia	4	2	0	2	5	6	−1	6	Eliminated in Round of 16
13	Italy	4	2	0	2	3	4	−1	6	Eliminated in Round of 16
14	Iran	4	1	2	1	4	6	−2	5	Eliminated in Round of 16
15	Slovakia	4	1	1	2	7	12	−5	4	Eliminated in Round of 16
16	Russia	4	1	0	3	5	5	0	3	Eliminated in Round of 16
17	Croatia	3	1	0	2	3	5	−2	3	Eliminated in Group stage
18	Canada	3	0	2	1	3	6	−3	2	Eliminated in Group stage
19	Austria	3	0	1	2	4	6	−2	1	Eliminated in Group stage
20	Panama	3	0	0	3	2	7	−5	0	Eliminated in Group stage
21	Venezuela	3	0	0	3	2	9	−7	0	Eliminated in Group stage
22	United Arab Emirates (H)	3	0	0	3	2	10	−8	0	Eliminated in Group stage
23	Iraq	3	0	0	3	2	12	−10	0	Eliminated in Group stage
24	New Zealand	3	0	0	3	0	11	−11	0	Eliminated in Group stage

(H) Hosts

== Goalscorers ==
Top scorers after the end of the tournament this year.

7 goals

- (Sweden) Valmir Berisha

6 goals

- (Brazil) Gabriel Boschilia
- (Nigeria) Kelechi Iheanacho

5 goals

- (Brazil) Nathan
- (Slovakia) Tomáš Vestenický

4 goals

- (Argentina) Joaquín Ibáñez
- (Brazil) Mosquito
- (Mexico) Iván Ochoa
- (Nigeria) Taiwo Awoniyi
- (Nigeria) Musa Yahaya
- (Uruguay) Franco Acosta
- (Uruguay) Leandro Otormín

3 goals

- (Japan) Ryoma Watanabe
- (Morocco) Karim Achahbar
- (Morocco) Younes Bnou Marzouk
- (Nigeria) Musa Muhammed
- (Sweden) Gustav Engvall

2 goals

- (Argentina) Sebastián Driussi
- (Argentina) Germán Ferreyra
- (Argentina) Matías Sánchez
- (Austria) Nikola Zivotic
- (Brazil) Caio
- (Canada) Jordan Hamilton
- (Honduras) Jorge Bodden
- (Honduras) Brayan Velásquez
- (Italy) Luca Vido
- (Ivory Coast) Moussa Bakayoko
- (Ivory Coast) Franck Kessie
- (Mexico) Alejandro Díaz
- (Mexico) Ulises Jaimes
- (Nigeria) Isaac Success
- (Nigeria) Chidiebere Nwakali
- (Nigeria) Samuel Okon
- (Russia) Aleksandr Makarov
- (Russia) Ramil Sheydayev
- (Uruguay) Kevin Méndez

1 goal

- (Argentina) Lucio Compagnucci
- (Argentina) Rodrigo Moreira
- (Argentina) Leonardo Suárez
- (Austria) Sascha Horvath
- (Austria) Tobias Pellegrini
- (Brazil) Gabriel
- (Brazil) Joanderson
- (Canada) Elias Roubos
- (Croatia) Alen Halilović
- (Croatia) Robert Murić
- (Croatia) Ante Roguljić
- (Honduras) Jeffri Flores
- (Honduras) Fredy Medina
- (Iran) Ali Gholizadeh
- (Iran) Mostafa Hashemi
- (Iran) Amir Hossein Karimi
- (Iran) Yousef Seyyedi
- (Iraq) Mohammed Salam
- (Iraq) Sherko Karim
- (Italy) Vittorio Parigini
- (Ivory Coast) Junior Ahissan
- (Ivory Coast) Aboubakar Keita
- (Ivory Coast) Yakou Meïté
- (Japan) Daisuke Sakai
- (Japan) Taro Sugimoto
- (Japan) Kosei Uryu
- (Morocco) Nabil Jaadi
- (Morocco) Hamza Sakhi
- (Mexico) José Almanza
- (Mexico) Marco Granados
- (Mexico) Ulises Rivas
- (Nigeria) Chidera Ezeh
- (Nigeria) Chigozi Obasi
- (Panama) Werner Wald
- (Panama) Ervin Zorrilla
- (Russia) Aleksandr Golovin
- (Slovakia) Denis Vavro
- (Slovakia) Michal Siplak
- (Sweden) Mirza Halvadžić
- (Sweden) Erdal Rakip
- (Sweden) Anton Salétros
- (Sweden) Carlos Strandberg
- (Sweden) Ali Suljić
- (Tunisia) Firas Ben Larbi
- (Tunisia) Mohamed Dräger
- (Tunisia) Maher Gabsi
- (Tunisia) Hazem Haj Hassen
- (Tunisia) Chiheb Jbeli
- (United Arab Emirates) Zayed Al-Ameri
- (United Arab Emirates) Khaled Khalfan
- (Uruguay) Marcio Benítez
- (Uruguay) Joel Bregonis
- (Uruguay) Facundo Ospitaleche
- (Uruguay) Franco Pizzichillo
- (Uzbekistan) Shohjahon Abbasov
- (Uzbekistan) Rustamjon Ashurmatov
- (Uzbekistan) Jamshid Boltaboev
- (Venezuela) José Caraballo
- (Venezuela) José Márquez

1 own goal

- (Croatia) Duje Ćaleta-Car (playing against Uzbekistan)
- (Mexico) Érick Aguirre (playing against Nigeria)
- (Sweden) Linus Wahlqvist (playing against Japan)
