= Ezeh =

Ezeh is a common Igbo surname, derived from the word eze, which means “king”.

It may refer to:

- Charles Ezeh (born 1997), Nigerian football player
- Chidera Ezeh (born 1997), Nigerian football player
- Colly Ezeh (born 1979), Nigerian-born Hong Kong football player
- Florence Ezeh (born 1977), hammer thrower from Togo
- Henry Ezeh (born 1991), Nigerian football striker
- Ikechukwu Ezeh (born 1987), Nigerian football striker
- Obi Ezeh (1988–2024), American football linebacker
