= Leomar Pinto =

Venezuelan footballer (born 1997)

Personal information
- Full name: Leomar José Pinto Blanco
- Date of birth: 17 March 1997 (age 29)
- Place of birth: Caracas, Venezuela
- Height: 1.70 m (5 ft 7 in)
- Position: Winger

Team information
- Current team: Atlético Pulpileño

Youth career
- Caracas

Senior career*
Years	Team	Apps	(Gls)
2013–2016	Caracas B		
2013–2016	Caracas	11	(1)
2016–2018	Elche B	39	(9)
2016–2018	Elche	3	(0)
2017–2018	→ Ontinyent (loan)	11	(0)
2018–2019	Cádiz B	19	(0)
2019–2020	Cartagena B	22	(4)
2019–2020	Cartagena	1	(0)
2020–2021	Gerena	11	(1)
2021–2022	Olímpic Xàtiva	52	(5)
2022–2023	Lorca Deportiva	28	(6)
2023–2025	Villarrobledo	50	(7)
2025	Unión Molinense	14	(2)
2025–	Atlético Pulpileño	7	(0)

International career
2013	Venezuela U17	7	(0)
- * Club domestic league appearances and goals as of 19 October 2025

Leomar José Pinto Blanco (born 17 March 1997) is a Venezuelan professional footballer who plays for Spanish Tercera Federación club Atlético Pulpileño as a winger.

== Club career ==
Born in Caracas, Pinto was a Caracas FC youth graduate. After making his senior debut with the reserves, he made his first team debut on 10 November 2013, coming on as a second-half substitute in a 2–2 home draw against Deportivo Petare. In March 2014, after impressing in 2013 FIFA U-17 World Cup, he had an 11-day trial at Arsenal.

Pinto scored his first professional goal on 19 November 2014, netting his team's only in a 1–2 away loss against Zamora FC. He was given his first start late in the month, in a 0–0 draw at Llaneros de Guanare.

In January 2016 Pinto moved abroad, signing for Elche CF. However, due to bureaucratic problems, he was only registered in August, being assigned to the reserves in Tercera División.

Pinto made his first team debut on 7 September 2016, replacing Liberto Beltrán in a 2–2 Copa del Rey away draw against CD Mirandés, as his side went through on penalties. The following 14 August, he was loaned to Segunda División B side Ontinyent CF.

On 29 August 2018, Pinto moved to another reserve team, Cádiz CF B in the fourth tier.
