= Leandro Otormín =

Uruguayan footballer (born 1996)

Personal information
- Full name: Leandro Gastón Otormín Fumero
- Date of birth: 30 July 1996 (age 30)
- Place of birth: Paso de los Toros, Uruguay
- Height: 1.78 m (5 ft 10 in)
- Position: Attacking midfielder

Team information
- Current team: Mumbai City
- Number: 20

Youth career
- –2015: Nacional

Senior career*
| Years | Team | Apps | (Gls) |
| 2015–2019 | Nacional | 5 | (4) |
| 2016 | → Racing Montevideo (loan) | 1 | (1) |
| 2016 | → Venados (loan) | 1 | (0) |
| 2019–2021 | Montevideo City Torque | 27 | (6) |
| 2021 | Cerro Largo | 29 | (13) |
| 2022–2023 | Nacional | 12 | (0) |
| 2022–2023 | → Defensa y Justicia (loan) | 2 | (1) |
| 2023 | Liverpool | 15 | (3) |
| 2023 | AEL | 1 | (1) |
| 2024 | Montevideo Wanderers | 18 | (0) |
| 2025 | Cerro Largo | 15 | (3) |
| 2025 | Juventud | 4 | (0) |
| 2025–2026 | Oriente Petrolero | 6 | (1) |
| 2026– | Mumbai City | 1 | (0) |

International career
| 2013 | Uruguay U17 | 10 | (7) |
| 2015 | Uruguay U20 | 1 | (0) |
- * Club domestic league appearances and goals as of 13:30, 12 October 2026 (UTC)

Leandro Gastón Otormín Fumero (born 30 July 1996) is a Uruguayan professional footballer who plays as a forward for Indian Super League club Mumbai City.

== Career ==
A youth academy graduate of Nacional, Otormín made his professional debut on 15 August 2015, coming on as a 74th minute substitute for Leandro Barcia in 4–1 win against Villa Teresa. While being on loan at Racing Montevideo, he scored his first senior goal on 7 February 2016 in a 2–0 win against El Tanque Sisley.

Otormín is a former Uruguay youth international and was included in squad for 2013 FIFA U-17 World Cup. He scored four goals from five matches in the tournament, netting braces against New Zealand and Slovakia. Along with Franco Acosta, he was also team's top scorer at the tournament.
