= Joaquín Ibáñez (footballer, born 1996) =

Argentine footballer

Personal information
- Full name: Joaquín Bautista Ibáñez
- Date of birth: 5 September 1996 (age 30)
- Place of birth: Venado Tuerto, Argentina
- Height: 1.78 m (5 ft 10 in)
- Position: Left winger

Team information
- Current team: Almirante Brown

Youth career
- Lanús

Senior career*
| Years | Team | Apps | (Gls) |
| 2016–2017 | Lanús | 0 | (0) |
| 2016–2017 | → Los Andes (loan) | 9 | (0) |
| 2017–2018 | Arsenal de Sarandí | 0 | (0) |
| 2018–2021 | Almirante Brown | 75 | (10) |
| 2022 | Arsenal de Sarandí | 22 | (1) |
| 2023 | Colón | 9 | (1) |
| 2024 | San Martín Tucumán | 2 | (0) |
| 2024– | Almirante Brown | 27 | (0) |

International career
| 2013 | Argentina U17 | 9 | (4) |
| 2015 | Argentina U20 | 7 | (0) |
- * Club domestic league appearances and goals as of 17:38, 30 June 2025 (UTC)

Joaquín Bautista Ibáñez (born 5 September 1996) is an Argentine professional footballer who plays as a left winger for Almirante Brown.

== Career ==
=== Club ===
Ibáñez's career began with Lanús. In July 2016, Ibáñez joined Los Andes of Primera B Nacional on loan. He made his professional debut on 11 September 2016 in a defeat to Atlético Paraná. Overall, Ibáñez made nine appearances, of which only one was a start, before returning to Lanús. On 31 July 2017, Ibáñez joined Argentine Primera División side Arsenal de Sarandí on a permanent transfer. A year later, after not featuring for Arsenal, Ibáñez made a move to join Primera B Metropolitana's Almirante Brown.

In January 2022, Ibáñez returned to his former club Arsenal de Sarandí on a deal until the end of 2022. A year later, in January 2023, he moved to Colón.

=== International ===
Ibáñez played at U17 and U20 level for Argentina. In early 2013, Ibáñez featured three times at the 2013 South American Under-17 Football Championship which his nation won on home soil. In late 2013, Ibáñez participated in six matches and scored four goals at the 2013 FIFA U-17 World Cup in the United Arab Emirates. He scored two goals in Group E versus Austria and Canada, and two goals in the knockout stages versus Tunisia and Ivory Coast. He was called up as part of Argentina's training squad for the 2014 FIFA World Cup. He won his seven U20 caps at the 2015 South American Youth Football Championship in Uruguay.

== Career statistics ==
As of 27 April 2024.

| Club | Division | Season | League | | Cup | | Continental | | Total | |
| Club | Division | Season | Apps | Goals | Apps | Goals | Apps | Goals | Apps | Goals |
|---|---|---|---|---|---|---|---|---|---|---|
| Los Andes | Primera B Nacional | 2016-17 | 9 | 0 | — | | — | | 9 | 0 |
| Almirante Brown | Primera B Metropolitana | 2018-19 | 15 | 1 | — | | — | | 15 | 1 |
| Almirante Brown | Primera B Metropolitana | 2019-20 | 22 | 4 | 1 | 0 | — | | 23 | 4 |
| Almirante Brown | Primera B Metropolitana | 2020 | 4 | 1 | — | | — | | 4 | 1 |
| Almirante Brown | Primera B Nacional | 2021 | 34 | 4 | — | | — | | 34 | 4 |
| Almirante Brown | Primera B Nacional | 2024 | | | | | | | | |
| Almirante Brown | Total | | 75 | 10 | 1 | 0 | 0 | 0 | 76 | 10 |
| Arsenal de Sarandí | Primera División | 2022 | 13 | 0 | 9 | 1 | — | | 22 | 1 |
| Colón | Primera División | 2023 | 7 | 1 | 2 | 0 | — | | 9 | 1 |
| San Martín (T) | Primera B Nacional | 2024 | 3 | 0 | — | | — | | 3 | 0 |
| Career total | | | 107 | 11 | 12 | 1 | 0 | 0 | 119 | 12 |

== Honours ==
Argentina U17

- South American Under-17 Football Championship: 2013

Argentina U20

- South American Youth Football Championship: 2015
