= Sabri Ben Hessen =

Tunisian footballer (born 1996)

Personal information
- Date of birth: 13 June 1996 (age 30)
- Place of birth: Sfax, Tunisia
- Height: 1.89 m (6 ft 2 in)
- Position: Goalkeeper

Team information
- Current team: ES Sahel
- Number: 32

Youth career
- CS Sfaxien

Senior career*
Years	Team	Apps	(Gls)
2013–2025	CS Sfaxien	26	(0)
2018	→ CS Hammam-Lif (loan)		
2025–	ES Sahel	28	(0)

International career^{‡}
2013	Tunisia U17	4	(0)
2014	Tunisia U20	2	(0)
2015	Tunisia U23	5	(0)
2026–	Tunisia	2	(0)
- * Club domestic league appearances and goals as of 23:23, 15 May 2026 (UTC) ‡ National team caps and goals as of 23:23, 15 May 2026 (UTC)

Sabri Ben Hessen (Arabic: صبري بن حسن; born 13 June 1996) is a Tunisian professional footballer who plays as a goalkeeper for Tunisian Ligue Professionnelle 1 club ES Sahel, and the Tunisia national team.

== Club career ==
Ben Hessen is a youth product of CS Sfaxien, and signed his first professional contract with the club in 2013. On 14 June 2018, he extended his contract with CS Sfaxien until 2022 and joined CS Hammam-Lif on loan for the remainder of the season. On 28 June 2022, he extended his contract with CS Sfaxien until 2024. On 5 February 2024, he again extended his contract until 2027. On 2 August 2025, he transferred to ES Sahel on a 3-year contract.

== International career ==
Ben Hessen played for the Tunisia U17s at the 2013 FIFA U-17 World Cup. He played for the Tunisia U23s at the 2015 U-23 Africa Cup of Nations. He made the Tunisia national team for the 2025 Africa Cup of Nations. He made his official debut with the senior team in a 1–0 friendly win over Haiti on 28 March 2026. He made the final squad for the 2026 FIFA World Cup.

== Honours ==
CS Sfaxien

- Tunisian Cup: 2018–19, 2020–21, 2021–22
