= Musa Yahaya =

Nigerian footballer

Personal information
- Full name: Musa Auwal Yahaya
- Date of birth: 16 December 1997 (age 28)
- Place of birth: Kaduna, Nigeria
- Height: 1.70 m (5 ft 7 in)
- Positions: Defender; midfielder

Team information
- Current team: Rudar
- Number: 5

Youth career
- 2009–2012: Mutunchi Academy
- 2012–2013: Tottenham Hotspur
- 2014: → Celta de Vigo (loan)

Senior career*
Years	Team	Apps	(Gls)
2015	→ Ferroviário Maputo (loan)	0	(0)
2015–2016	→ Portimonense (loan)	12	(1)
2016	Portimonense	0	(0)
2016–2020	Porto B	70	(3)
2020–2021	Vizela	1	(0)
2021–2022	Académico de Viseu	4	(0)
2022–2023	Radnik Hadžići	19	(0)
2023–2024	TOŠK Tešanj	24	(0)
2024–	Rudar	20	(2)

International career^{‡}
2013	Nigeria U17	9	(4)
2015	Nigeria U20	6	(4)
Medal record
FIFA U-17 World Cup
Winner	United Arab Emirates 2013
African U-20 Championship
Winner	Senegal 2015
- * Club domestic league appearances and goals as of 3 April 2025 ‡ National team caps and goals as of 1 March 2016

Musa Auwal Yahaya (born 16 December 1997) is a Nigerian professional footballer who plays as a defender for Montenegrin club Rudar.

== Club career ==
Born in Kaduna, Northern Nigeria, Musa started his football career at Mutunchi Academy before he was selected to represent Nigeria at the 2013 FIFA U-17 World Cup. Musa made his debut on 28 February 2016 in the Segunda Liga after coming on as a 46th minute replacement for Theo Ryuki.

On 22 July 2021, he signed a two-year contract with Académico de Viseu.

== International career ==
Musa has represented Nigeria at major international tournaments including the 2013 FIFA U-17 World Cup and 2015 FIFA U-20 World Cup.

== Career statistics ==
As of match played 28 February 2016.

Appearances and goals by club, season and competition
Club	Season	League			FA Cup		League Cup		Europe		Total	
Club	Season	Division	Apps	Goals	Apps	Goals	Apps	Goals	Apps	Goals	Apps	Goals
Portimonense S.C.	2015–16	Segunda Liga	1	0	0	0	0	0	0	0	1	0
Career total			1	0	0	0	0	0	0	0	1	0
