= Mohammadreza Kaveh =

Iranian footballer

Mohammad reza kaveh
Personal information
- Full name: Mohammad reza kaveh
- Date of birth: 22 July 1997 (age 29)
- Place of birth: Mashhad, Iran
- Position: Winger

Team information
- Current team: Padideh F.C.
- Number: 9

Youth career
- 2013–2016: Padideh F.C.

Senior career*
Years	Team	Apps	(Gls)
2016–2018–	Padideh F.C.		

International career
2017–2018	Iran U23		
- Iran
- * Club domestic league appearances and goals

Mohammadreza Kaveh (born 22 July 1997) is an Iranian football player that is currently a player of Iran national under-23 football team, and Padideh F.C. He has played in FIFA World Cup U-17 India in 2012 for Iran national team U-17. After that in 2013 FIFA World Cup U-17 in UAE 🇦🇪 he played for Iran national team (team Melli)
