= Valmir Berisha =

Swedish footballer

Personal information
- Date of birth: 6 June 1996 (age 30)
- Place of birth: Deçan, FR Yugoslavia
- Height: 1.79 m (5 ft 10 1/2 in)
- Position: Striker

Team information
- Current team: Malisheva
- Number: 77

Youth career
- –2013: Halmstad
- 2014: Roma

Senior career*
Years	Team	Apps	(Gls)
2014–2015	Roma	0	(0)
2014–2015	→ Panathinaikos (loan)	1	(0)
2015–2016	Cambuur	6	(0)
2017–2019	Aalesund	23	(0)
2018	→ Fjölnir (loan)	18	(2)
2019–2020	Velež Mostar	9	(1)
2020–2021	Chindia Târgoviște	44	(4)
2021–2022	Sliema Wanderers	21	(3)
2022	Oțelul Galați	12	(0)
2023	Minaur Baia Mare	7	(1)
2023–2024	1599 Șelimbăr	8	(1)
2024	Liria Prizren	10	(1)
2024–	Malisheva	23	(4)

International career
2013	Sweden U17	16	(10)
2014	Sweden U18	2	(1)
2014–2015	Sweden U19	8	(5)
2016	Sweden Olympic	2	(0)
Medal record
Men's football
Representing Sweden
FIFA U-17 World Cup
Bronze medal – third place	2013 UAE	U-17 Team
- * Club domestic league appearances and goals as of 26 June 2025

Valmir Berisha (born 6 June 1996) is a Swedish professional footballer who plays as a forward for Malisheva in Kosovo.

== Club career ==
=== Roma ===
Having played for Halmstads BK as a youth, Berisha signed a 2.5-year contract with Roma in January 2014.

==== Loan to Panathinaikos ====
He joined Panathinaikos on loan during the 2014–15 season. He made his Super League debut on 3 May 2015 against PAE Kerkyra replacing Nikos Karelis after 80 minutes in a 1–1 draw.

=== Cambuur ===
In July 2015, he again left Roma temporarily, moving to Dutch club SC Cambuur on loan for the 2015–16 with the option of a further season.

=== Aalesund ===
After Cambuur, he moved to Aalesunds FK in 2017, but was loaned out to Fjölnir in 2018, where he stayed until his loan ended in January 2019.

=== Velež Mostar ===
On 19 February 2019, Berisha signed for First League FBiH club FK Velež Mostar on a 1-year contract with the possibility of an extension for one more year. He made his debut for Velež on 16 March 2019, in a 2–0 home league win against NK Jedinstvo Bihać.

He scored his first goal for Velež on 27 April 2019, in a 4–0 home league win against FK Rudar Kakanj. On 25 May 2019, Berisha won the First League of FBiH with Velež after the club beat NK Bosna Visoko 0–2 away and got promoted to the Premier League of Bosnia and Herzegovina. He scored his first Premier League goal for Velež on 20 July 2019, in a 1–3 home loss against FK Mladost Doboj Kakanj. Berisha left Velež in January 2020.

=== Chindia Târgoviște ===
On 23 January 2020, Berisha signed a one-and-a-half-year contract with Romanian club Chindia Târgoviște.

=== Sliema Wanderers ===
Berisha moved to Sliema, Malta with Sliema Wanderers F.C. for season 2021-22.

== International career ==
Berisha was a member of the Swedish under-17 national team that finished third at the 2013 FIFA U-17 World Cup and finished as the top scorer in the competition with seven goals. He represented the Sweden Olympic football team at the 2016 Summer Olympics in Rio de Janeiro, Brazil.

== Personal life ==
He was born in Kosovo to Kosovo Albanian parents before moving to Sweden at a young age.

== Honours ==
Velež Mostar

- First League of the Federation of Bosnia and Herzegovina: 2018–19

Sweden U17

- FIFA U-17 World Cup third place: 2013

Individual

- FIFA U-17 World Cup Golden Boot: 2013 (7 goals)
