= Michael Lercher =

Austrian footballer

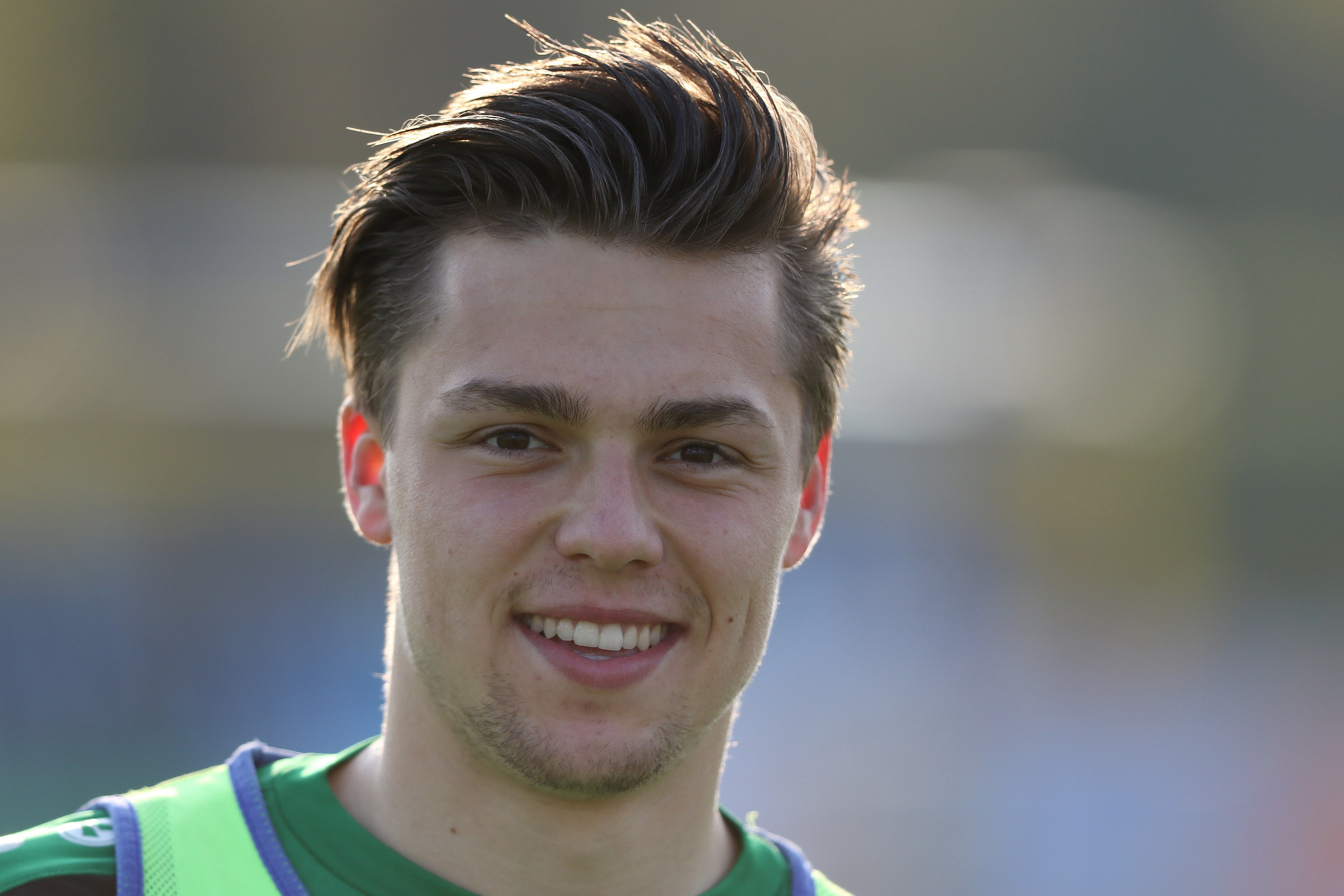
- Lercher with Wacker Innsbruck in 2016

Personal information
- Date of birth: 6 January 1996 (age 30)
- Place of birth: Innsbruck, Austria
- Height: 1.77 m (5 ft 10 in)
- Position: Left-back

Youth career
- 2001–2010: Innsbrucker AC
- 2010–2012: AKA Tirol
- 2012–2015: Werder Bremen

Senior career*
Years	Team	Apps	(Gls)
2015–2017	FC Wacker Innsbruck	56	(1)
2017–2020	SV Mattersburg	39	(1)
2020–2022	SV Ried	32	(0)
2023	ASKÖ Oedt	0	(0)

International career
2012–2013	Austria U17	24	(0)
2014	Austria U18	2	(0)
2014	Austria U19	2	(0)
2017	Austria U21	3	(0)
- * Club domestic league appearances and goals as of 20 May 2022

Michael Lercher (born 6 January 1996) is an Austrian professional footballer who plays as a left-back.

== Club career ==
On 21 August 2020, he signed with SV Ried.
