= Koto Abe =

Japanese footballer

Koto Abe 阿部 航斗
Personal information
- Date of birth: 1 August 1997 (age 29)
- Place of birth: Kameda, Niigata, Japan
- Height: 1.86 m (6 ft 1 in)
- Position: Goalkeeper

Team information
- Current team: Cerezo Osaka (on loan from Júbilo Iwata)
- Number: 31

Youth career
- –2009: Kameda FC
- 2010–2015: Albirex Niigata

College career
Years	Team	Apps	(Gls)
2016–2019	University of Tsukuba		

Senior career*
Years	Team	Apps	(Gls)
2020–2024	Albirex Niigata	41	(0)
2025–	Júbilo Iwata	9	(0)
2026–	→ Cerezo Osaka (loan)	0	(0)

International career^{‡}
- Japan U16
2013	Japan U17	1	(0)
2015	Japan U18	3	(0)
- Japan U21
- * Club domestic league appearances and goals as of 22:01, 3 October 2026 (UTC) ‡ National team caps and goals as of 17:04, 27 February 2021 (UTC)

Koto Abe (阿部 航斗, Abe Kōto; born 1 August 1997) is a Japanese footballer currently playing as a goalkeeper for J1 League club Cerezo Osaka, on loan from Júbilo Iwata.

== Career ==
On 4 June 2019, Abe was announced at Albirex Niigata from the 2020 season. It was announced that he would wear the number 21 on his jersey.

Abe made his debut for Albirex Niigata against Giravanz Kitakyushu on the 27th February 2021.

In December 2024, it was announced that Abe would be moving to Júbilo Iwata.

== Career statistics ==
=== Club ===
As of 3 October 2026.

Appearances and goals by club, season and competition
Club	Season	League			National cup (Note: Includes Emperors Cup)		League cup (Note: Includes J.League Cup)		Total	
Club	Season	Division	Apps	Goals	Apps	Goals	Apps	Goals	Apps	Goals
Tsukuba Excaliburs	2016	–			1	0	–		1	0
Tsukuba Excaliburs	2017	–			4	0	–		4	0
Tsukuba Excaliburs	Total		0	0	5	0	0	0	5	0
Albirex Niigata	2020	J2 League	0	0	0	0	0	0	0	0
Albirex Niigata	2021	J2 League	32	0	0	0	0	0	32	0
Albirex Niigata	2022	J2 League	0	0	1	0	0	0	1	0
Albirex Niigata	2023	J1 League	4	0	4	0	6	0	14	0
Albirex Niigata	2024	J1 League	5	0	2	0	8	0	15	0
Albirex Niigata	Total		41	0	7	0	14	0	62	0
Júbilo Iwata	2025	J2 League	8	0	0	0	1	0	9	0
Júbilo Iwata	2026	J2/J3 (100)	1	0	–		–		1	0
Júbilo Iwata	Total		9	0	0	0	1	0	10	0
Cerezo Osaka (loan)	2026–27	J1 League	0	0	1	0	0	0	1	0
Career total			50	0	13	0	15	0	78	0
