= Joanderson =

Brazilian footballer

Personal information
- Full name: Joanderson de Jesus Assis
- Date of birth: 16 February 1996 (age 30)
- Place of birth: Jequié, Brazil
- Height: 1.80 m (5 ft 11 in)
- Position: Forward

Team information
- Current team: Olancho FC
- Number: 11

Youth career
- 2009–2015: São Paulo

Senior career*
Years	Team	Apps	(Gls)
2015–2018	São Paulo	0	(0)
2016	→ Cruzeiro (loan)	0	(0)
2017	→ Internacional (loan)	2	(0)
2018	→ Atlético Goianiense (loan)	9	(0)
2018	→ Criciúma (loan)	8	(0)
2019	Grêmio B	22	(3)
2020	Gainare Tottori	11	(1)
2021	Sampaio Corrêa	10	(1)
2021–2022	Passo Fundo	16	(5)
2022	Persik Kediri	11	(0)
2023	Cianorte	12	(2)
2023	Oeste	2	(0)
2023	Cascavel	11	(0)
2023–2024	Naft Al-Basra	0	(0)
2024	Azuriz	1	(0)
2024	Glória	8	(1)
2024	Olancho	20	(3)
2025–2026	Oliveirense	30	(1)
2026–	Olancho	2	(1)

International career
2013	Brazil U17	2	(1)
- * Club domestic league appearances and goals as of 17 August 2026

Joanderson de Jesus Assis (born 16 February 1996), simply known as Joanderson, is a Brazilian professional footballer who plays as a forward for Liga Nacional de Fútbol de Honduras club Olancho FC.

== Club career ==
Born in Jequié, Joanderson joined the youth setup of São Paulo in 2009. He scored seven goals during the 2013 Copa do Brasil under-17, and became the cup's top-scorer. Amidst interest from other national and international clubs, he was promoted to the senior team on 22 April 2015 and signed a contract until 2019.

On 18 April 2016, Joanderson was loaned out to Cruzeiro in loan deal, which saw Tom moving in the opposite direction. On 22 February 2017, he was loaned out to Internacional for the upcoming season.

Joanderson joined Atlético Goianiense on loan for the upcoming season on 16 February 2018. On 13 July, he moved to Criciúma on loan.

After a year with Grêmio's B/U23 team, Joanderson moved to Japanese club Gainare Tottori on 24 January 2020.

== International career ==
Joanderson has been capped by Brazil at under-17 level, representing the side at 2013 Under-17 World Cup and scored a goal against UAE in the tournament.

== Career statistics ==
As of match played on 10 October 2018

Club	Season	National League			State League		Cup		Continental		Total	
Club	Season	Division	Apps	Goals	Apps	Goals	Apps	Goals	Apps	Goals	Apps	Goals
Cruzeiro (loan)	2016	Série A	0	0	0	0	0	0	0	0	0	0
Internacional (loan)	2017	Série B	1	0	0	0	1	0	—		2	0
Atlético Goianiense (loan)	2018	Série B	6	0	3	0	0	0	—		9	0
Criciúma (loan)	2018	Série B	8	0	0	0	0	0	—		8	0
Career total			15	0	3	0	1	0	0	0	19	0
