= Zayed Al-Hammadi =

Emirati association football player (born 1996)

Zayed Al-Hammadi زايد الحمادي
Personal information
- Full name: Zayed Ahmed Hassan Al-Hammadi
- Date of birth: 23 February 1996 (age 30)
- Place of birth: Emirates
- Height: 1.81 m (5 ft 11 in)
- Position: Goalkeeper

Team information
- Current team: Al Wahda
- Number: 36

Youth career
- 2008–2015: Al Dhafra

Senior career*
Years	Team	Apps	(Gls)
2015–2022	Al Dhafra	35	(0)
2019–2020	→ Hatta (loan)	1	(0)
2021–2022	→ Khor Fakkan (loan)	12	(0)
2022–	Al Wahda	16	(0)
2022–2024	→ Al Bataeh (loan)	25	(0)
- * Club domestic league appearances and goals as of 16 March 2026

Zayed Al-Hammadi (Arabic:زايد الحمادي) (born 23 February 1996) is an Emirati footballer. He currently plays as a goalkeeper for Al Wahda.

== Career ==
=== Al Dhafra ===
Al-Hammadi started his career at Al Dhafra and is a product of the Al Dhafra's youth system. On 14 January 2017, Al-Hammadi made his professional debut for Al Dhafra against Al-Nasr in the Pro League.

=== Hatta ===
On 30 June 2019 left Al Dhafra and signed with Hatta on loan of season. On 19 September 2019, Al-Hammadi made his professional debut for Hatta against Shabab Al-Ahli in the Pro League.
