= Suhail Al-Noubi =

Emirati footballer (born 1996)

Personal information
- Full name: Suhail Ahmed Al-Noubi Saeed
- Date of birth: 9 January 1996 (age 30)
- Place of birth: Abu Dhabi, United Arab Emirates
- Height: 1.82 m (5 ft 11 1/2 in)
- Position: Winger

Team information
- Current team: Baniyas
- Number: 18

Youth career
- Baniyas

Senior career*
Years	Team	Apps	(Gls)
2014–	Baniyas	193	(26)

International career
2019	United Arab Emirates	1	(0)
- * Club domestic league appearances and goals

Suhail Ahmed Al-Noubi (Arabic: سُهَيْل أَحْمَد النُّوبِي سَعِيد) (born 9 January 1996) is an Emirati footballer. He currently plays as a winger for Baniyas.

Al-Noubi was capped once for the United Arab Emirates, in a 2019 friendly versus Saudi Arabia.

== See also ==
- List of one-club men in association football
