= Kevin Larrea =

Uruguayan footballer (born 1996)

Personal information
- Full name: Kevin Axel Larrea Alzamendi
- Date of birth: 19 April 1996 (age 30)
- Place of birth: Paysandú, Uruguay
- Height: 1.86 m (6 ft 1 in)
- Position: Goalkeeper

Team information
- Current team: Cerro
- Number: 1

Youth career
- 2009–2012: CA Litoral
- 2012–2016: Defensor Sporting

Senior career*
| Years | Team | Apps | (Gls) |
| 2016–2019 | Defensor Sporting | 0 | (0) |
| 2016–2018 | → Boston River (loan) | 7 | (0) |
| 2019 | Rampla Juniors | 9 | (0) |
| 2020 | Tacuarembó | 20 | (0) |
| 2021–2022 | Cerrito | 30 | (0) |
| 2023 | Mitre SdE | 16 | (0) |
| 2024 | Chaco For Ever | 3 | (0) |
| 2024– | Cerro | 0 | (0) |
- * Club domestic league appearances and goals as of 14 September 2024

Kevin Axel Larrea Alzamendi (born 19 April 1996) is a Uruguayan footballer who plays as a goalkeeper for Cerro in the Uruguayan Primera División.
