= Edin Bahtić (footballer, born 1996) =

Austrian footballer (born 1996)

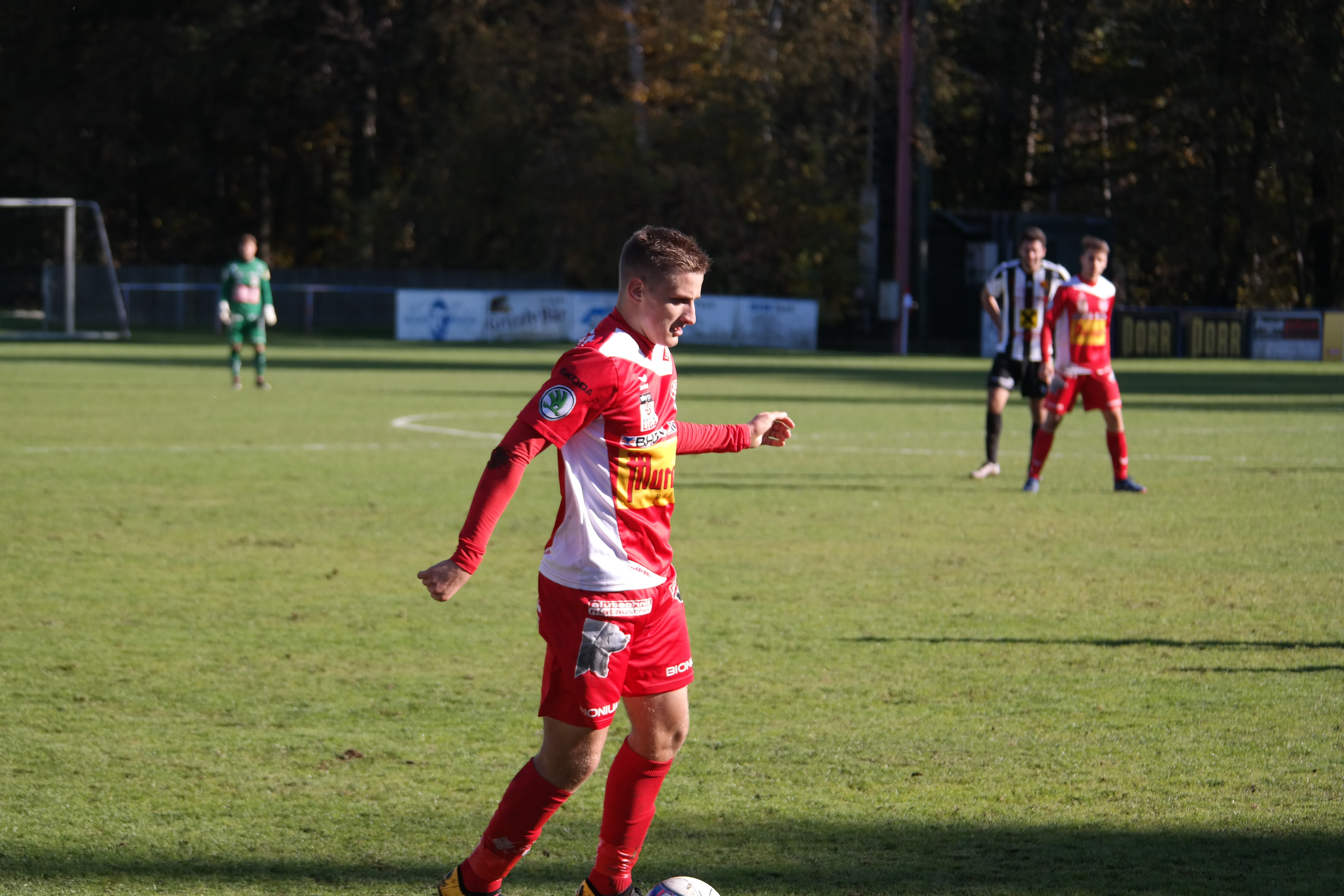

Personal information
- Date of birth: 14 July 1996 (age 30)
- Place of birth: Bruck an der Mur, Austria
- Height: 1.74 m (5 ft 8 1/2 in)
- Position: Midfielder

Senior career*
Years	Team	Apps	(Gls)
2013–2014	Kapfenberger SV II	17	(1)
2013–2017	Kapfenberger SV	45	(1)
2017–2018	NK Krško	?	(?)
2018	Mecklenburg Schwerin	13	(6)
2019	Lokomotiv Plovdiv	23	(4)
2020	Tsarsko Selo	1	(0)

International career
2013	Austria U17	7	(0)
2014	Austria U18	2	(0)
- * Club domestic league appearances and goals as of 1 June 2020

Edin Bahtić (born 14 July 1996) is an Austrian professional footballer who plays as a midfielder.

== Honours ==
=== Club ===
Lokomotiv Plovdiv

- Bulgarian Cup: 2018–19
