= Lucas Bundschuh =

Austrian footballer (born 1996)

Personal information
- Date of birth: 9 April 1996 (age 30)
- Place of birth: Kennelbach, Austria
- Height: 1.86 m (6 ft 1 in)
- Position: Goalkeeper

Team information
- Current team: SC Admira Dornbirn
- Number: 1

Youth career
- 2003–: Kennelbach
- –2012: AKA Voralberg
- 2012–2015: Freiburg

Senior career*
Years	Team	Apps	(Gls)
2014–2016	Freiburg II	0	(0)
2017	Swarovski Tirol	0	(0)
2017	Memmingen II	4	(0)
2018–2019	Sonthofen	35	(0)
2019–2022	Dornbirn 1913	68	(0)
2022–	SC Admira Dornbirn	15	(0)

International career^{‡}
2011	Austria U16	1	(0)
2011–2013	Austria U17	7	(0)
- * Club domestic league appearances and goals as of 12 November 2022 ‡ National team caps and goals as of 7 September 2013

Lucas Bundschuh (born 9 April 1996) is an Austrian footballer who plays for Eliteliga Vorarlberg club SC Admira Dornbirn.

== Career ==
At the age of 16, Bundschuh joined the youth academy of German Bundesliga side Freiburg.

For the second half of 2016–17, he signed for Swarovski Tirol in the Austrian second division.

In 2017, he signed for German sixth division team Memmingen II.

In 2019, Bundschuh returned to Austria with Dornbirn 1913 .
