= Karim Achahbar =

Moroccan professional footballer (born 1996)

Personal information
- Date of birth: 3 January 1996 (age 30)
- Place of birth: Guingamp, France
- Height: 1.83 m (6 ft 0 in)
- Position: Centre forward

Team information
- Current team: Stade Briochin
- Number: 22

Senior career*
Years	Team	Apps	(Gls)
2013–2018	Guingamp II	50	(12)
2014–2018	Guingamp	1	(0)
2015–2016	→ Vendée Luçon (loan)	21	(4)
2016–2017	→ Quevilly-Rouen II (loan)	4	(2)
2016–2017	→ Quevilly-Rouen (loan)	23	(1)
2018–2018	→ Tubize (loan)	7	(0)
2019	Niort II	6	(0)
2020–2021	Épinal	2	(0)
2022–2023	Lannion	34	(21)
2023–	Stade Briochin	70	(7)

International career^{‡}
2013	Morocco U17	4	(3)
2015	Morocco U23	1	(1)
- * Club domestic league appearances and goals as of 23 June 2026 ‡ National team caps and goals as of 27 January 2016

Karim Achahbar (born 3 January 1996) is a professional footballer who plays as a forward for Championnat National club Stade Briochin. Born in France, he represented Morocco at international youth levels.

== Club career ==
Achahbar joined EA Guingamp in 2014. He contributed to EA Guingamp's 2013–14 Coupe de France trophy by playing against FC Bourg-Péronnas on 5 January 2014 and made his league debut against Montpellier HSC on 27 September 2014.

On 18 August 2015, he was loaned to Vendée Luçon.

== International career ==
Achahbar was a member of the Morocco national U-17 team for the 2013 FIFA U-17 World Cup. In this competition, he played 4 games and scored 3 goals.

== Career statistics ==
=== Club ===
As of 7 August 2018

Club	Season	League			Cup		Continental		Other		Total	
Club	Season	Division	Apps	Goals	Apps	Goals	Apps	Goals	Apps	Goals	Apps	Goals
EA Guingamp	2013–14	Ligue 1	0	0	1	0	—		—		1	0
EA Guingamp	2014–15	Ligue 1	1	0	1	0	0	0	—		2	0
EA Guingamp	2017–18	Ligue 1	0	0	1	0	0	0	—		2	0
EA Guingamp	Total		1	0	3	0	0	0	0	0	4	0
Vendée Luçon	2015–16	Championnat National	21	4	0	0	—		—		21	4
Quevilly-Rouen	2016–17	Championnat National	23	1	4	1	—		—		27	2
Tubize	2017–18	Belgian First Division B	4	0	0	0	—		3	0	7	0
Career total			49	5	7	1	0	0	3	0	59	6

== Honours ==
EA Guingamp

- Coupe de France: 2013–14
