= Zaharaddeen Bello =

Nigerian professional footballer

- Born: 21 December 1997 (age 28)
- Occupation: Professional Footballer

Zaharaddeen Bello (born 21 December 1997) is a Nigerian professional footballer who plays for Kano Pillars as a defender.

Zaharaddeen has represented Nigeria during the Nigeria U-17 World Cup, Nigeria U-20 World cup and Nigeria U23 World Cup national team.
