= Germán Ferreyra =

Argentine footballer (born 1996)

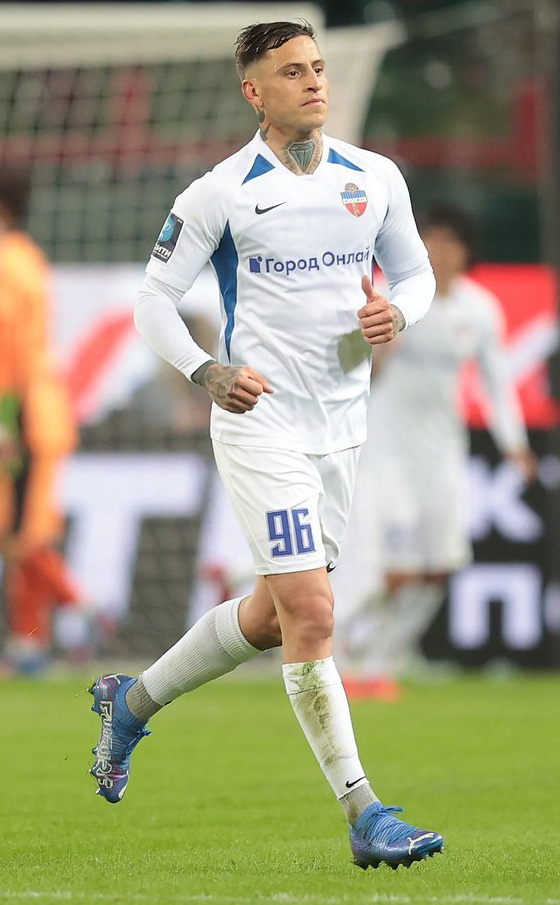
- Ferreyra with Yenisey in 2022

Personal information
- Full name: Germán Julio César Ferreyra
- Date of birth: 13 January 1996 (age 30)
- Place of birth: González Catán, Argentina
- Height: 1.75 m (5 ft 9 in)
- Position: Defender

Team information
- Current team: Western Sydney Wanderers
- Number: 33

Youth career
- –2015: Vélez Sarsfield

Senior career*
Years	Team	Apps	(Gls)
2015–2016	Vélez Sarsfield	2	(0)
2016	→ Arsenal de Sarandí (loan)	3	(1)
2016–2018	Unión La Calera	23	(2)
2017–2018	→ Arsenal de Sarandí (loan)	16	(1)
2019–2020	Racing Club	16	(0)
2020–2021	Akron Tolyatti	13	(0)
2021–2024	Yenisey Krasnoyarsk	75	(4)
2024–2026	Melbourne City	49	(2)
2026–	Western Sydney Wanderers	0	(0)

International career
2013	Argentina U17	15	(2)
- * Club domestic league appearances and goals as of 25 May 2024

Germán Julio César Ferreyra (Latin American Spanish: [xeɾˈman ˈxuʃo ˈsesaɾ feˈreiɾa]; (Note: As pronounced in Argentinian Spanish using sheísmo. With zheísmo, Julio is pronounced [ˈxuʒo].) born 13 January 1996) is an Argentine professional footballer who plays as a defender for A-League club Western Sydney Wanderers.

== Career ==
In October 2020, Akron Tolyatti announced the signing of Ferreyra.

In July 2021, Ferreyra signed a one-year contract, with the option of a second, with Yenisey Krasnoyarsk.

On 17 July 2024, Melbourne City announced the singing of Ferreyra to a two-year contract.

== Career statistics ==
=== Club ===
As of match played 3 May 2025

Appearances and goals by club, season and competition
Club	Season	League			Cup		Continental		Other		Total	
Club	Season	Division	Apps	Goals	Apps	Goals	Apps	Goals	Apps	Goals	Apps	Goals
Vélez Sarsfield	2015	Argentine Primera División	2	0	0	0	—		—		2	0
Arsenal de Sarandí (loan)	2016	Argentine Primera División	3	1	0	0	—		—		3	1
Unión La Calera	2016–17	Primera B de Chile	23	2	—		—		—		23	2
Arsenal de Sarandí (loan)	2017–18	Argentine Primera División	16	1	1	0	2	0	—		19	1
Racing Club	2019	Uruguayan Primera División	16	0	—		—		—		16	0
Akron Tolyatti	2020–21	Russian Football National League	13	0	—		—		—		13	0
Yenisey Krasnoyarsk	2021–22	Russian Football National League	28	1	6	0	—		—		34	1
Yenisey Krasnoyarsk	2022–23	Russian First League	26	1	0	0	—		2	0	28	1
Yenisey Krasnoyarsk	2023–24	Russian First League	21	2	2	0	—		—		23	2
Yenisey Krasnoyarsk	Total		75	4	8	0	—		2	0	85	4
Melbourne City	2024–25	A-League Men	24	2	1	0	—		—		25	2
Career total			172	10	10	0	2	0	2	0	186	10

== Honours ==
Melbourne City

- A-League Men Championship: 2025
