= Kosei Uryu =

Japanese footballer

Personal information
- Date of birth: 8 January 1996 (age 30)
- Place of birth: Fukuoka, Japan
- Height: 1.65 m (5 ft 5 in)
- Position: Midfielder

Team information
- Current team: Verspah Oita
- Number: 7

Youth career
- 2011–2013: Chikuyo Gakuen High School

College career
Years	Team	Apps	(Gls)
2014–2017	Fukuoka University		

Senior career*
Years	Team	Apps	(Gls)
2018	FC Imabari	12	(0)
2019–2020	Verspah Oita	45	(5)
2021–2023	Azul Claro Numazu	50	(3)
2023-	Verspah Oita	78	(6)
Total		185	(14)

International career^{‡}
2013	Japan U17	3	(1)
2014	Japan U18	3	(0)
- * Club domestic league appearances and goals as of 28 January 2024 @ 14:51PM ‡ National team caps and goals as of 17:04, 20 March 2021 (UTC)

Kosei Uryu (瓜生 昂勢, Uryu Kosei; born 8 January 1996) is a Japanese footballer currently playing as a midfielder for Azul Claro Numazu.

== Career statistics ==
=== Club ===
As of 20 March 2021.

Club	Season	League			National Cup		League Cup		Other		Total	
Club	Season	Division	Apps	Goals	Apps	Goals	Apps	Goals	Apps	Goals	Apps	Goals
FC Imabari	2018	JFL	12	0	1 (Note: Appearances in the Emperor's Cup)	0	–		0	0	13	0
Verspah Oita	2019	JFL	30	3	1	0	–		0	0	31	3
Verspah Oita	2020	JFL	15	2	3	0	–		0	0	18	2
Verspah Oita	Total		45	5	4	0	0	0	0	0	49	5
Azul Claro Numazu	2021	J3 League	1	0	0	0	–		0	0	1	0
Career total			58	5	5	0	0	0	0	0	63	5
