= Mosquito (footballer) =

Brazilian footballer

Personal information
- Full name: Thiago Rodrigues da Silva
- Date of birth: 6 January 1996 (age 30)
- Place of birth: Rio de Janeiro, Brazil
- Height: 1.74 m (5 ft 9 in)
- Position: Forward

Team information
- Current team: Nakhon Si United
- Number: 11

Youth career
- 2009–2011: Vasco da Gama
- 2012–2013: Atlético Paranaense

Senior career*
Years	Team	Apps	(Gls)
2014	Atlético Paranaense	12	(1)
2015–2017	Deportivo Maldonado	2	(0)
2015	→ Vasco da Gama (loan)	1	(0)
2015	→ Llagostera (loan)	3	(0)
2016	→ Atlético Paranaense (loan)	0	(0)
2017	→ Boavista (loan)	11	(2)
2017–2018	Arsenal de Sarandí	8	(1)
2018	Najran	0	(0)
2019–2020	Boavista	19	(0)
2020–2021	Deportivo Maldonado	23	(1)
2021–2022	Villa Nova	13	(3)
2022–2023	Lampang	23	(5)
2023–2024	Chiangmai United	31	(13)
2024	Bekasi City	14	(2)
2025–	Nakhon Si United	10	(3)

International career
2010	Brazil U14		
2011	Brazil U15	7	(12)
2013	Brazil U17	9	(6)
2014	Brazil U20	2	(1)
- * Club domestic league appearances and goals as of 26 April 2025

Thiago Rodrigues da Silva (born 6 January 1996), commonly known as Mosquito, is a Brazilian professional footballer who plays as a forward for Thai League 2 club Nakhon Si United.

== Club career ==
Born in Rio de Janeiro, Mosquito joined Vasco da Gama's youth setup in 2009, but left the club in 2011 due to unpaid wages. On 4 May 2012 he agreed a deal with São Paulo, but the deal was declared void only five days later.

Mosquito joined Atlético Paranaense on 29 October 2012, but was not allowed to play until February of the following year. He made his senior debut on 2 February 2014, starting and scoring his side's only in a 1–2 away loss against Rio Branco for the Campeonato Paranaense championship; it was his maiden appearance of the competition.

Mosquito made his Série A debut on 20 April 2014, playing the last 16 minutes of a 1–0 home win against Grêmio. He scored his first professional goal on the 27th, netting his side's first of a 2–2 away draw against Vitória.

On 20 February 2015, after being released by Furacão, Mosquito returned to his first club Vasco, signing a short-term deal. He was excluded from the first team in July, after only appearing in two matches.

On 14 August 2015 Mosquito moved abroad for the first time in his career, after agreeing to a loan deal with Spanish Segunda División side UE Llagostera. He made his debut for the club on 22 August, replacing Chumbi in a 0–2 home loss against CA Osasuna.

=== Arsenal de Sarandí ===
Mosquito signed a two-year contract with Arsenal de Sarandí in mid-2017.

== Honours ==
Brazil U20

- Toulon Tournament: 2014
