= Chidera Ezeh =

Nigerian footballer (born 1997)

Personal information
- Full name: Chidera Kennedy Ezeh
- Date of birth: 2 October 1997 (age 29)
- Place of birth: Lagos, Nigeria
- Height: 1.77 m (5 ft 9 1/2 in)
- Position: Forward

Team information
- Current team: Portimonense
- Number: 70

Youth career
- –2014: River Lane Academy
- 2014–2016: Porto

Senior career*
Years	Team	Apps	(Gls)
2016–2017	Porto B	0	(0)
2016–2017	→ Portimonense (loan)	13	(3)
2017–2020	Portimonense	5	(0)
2017–2018	→ Porto B (loan)	8	(0)
- * Club domestic league appearances and goals as of 17:53, 14 August 2019 (UTC)

Chidera Kennedy Ezeh (born 2 October 1997) is a Nigerian football player who plays in Portugal for the Under-23 squad of Portimonense.

== Club career ==
He made his professional debut in the Segunda Liga for Portimonense on 20 November 2016 in a game against Braga B.

== International ==
He won the 2013 FIFA U-17 World Cup with Nigeria, scoring a goal in the semi-final game against Sweden.
