= Franco Acosta =

Uruguayan footballer (1996–2021)

Personal information
- Full name: Franco Acosta Machado
- Date of birth: 5 March 1996
- Place of birth: Montevideo, Uruguay
- Date of death: 6 March 2021 (aged 25)
- Place of death: Pando, Uruguay
- Height: 1.76 m (5 ft 9 in)
- Position: Forward

Youth career
- 2009–2013: Fénix

Senior career*
Years	Team	Apps	(Gls)
2013–2015	Fénix	20	(3)
2015–2020	Villarreal B	48	(7)
2018	→ Racing Santander (loan)	4	(0)
2019–2020	→ Plaza Colonia (loan)	24	(3)
2020–2021	Atenas	7	(0)
Total		103	(13)

International career
2013	Uruguay U17	15	(12)
2015	Uruguay U20	14	(6)
- * Club domestic league appearances and goals

Franco Acosta Machado (5 March 1996 – 6 March 2021) was a Uruguayan professional footballer who played as a striker.

== Club career ==
Born in Montevideo, Acosta joined Centro Atlético Fénix's youth setup in 2009, aged 13. On 23 November 2013, he made his first team debut, coming on as a second-half substitute in a 1–0 home loss against Liverpool F.C. for the Primera División championship.

Acosta scored his first professional goal on 16 February 2014, netting the second in a 3–0 away win against Racing Club de Montevideo. On 1 July he agreed to a deal with S.C. Braga, but returned to Fénix in September.

Acosta was eventually included in the main squad and appeared in eight matches, scoring once. On 19 January 2015, he signed a 5 1/2-year contract with Villarreal CF, being assigned to the reserves in Segunda División B.

On 15 January 2018, Acosta joined Segunda División B team Racing de Santander on loan until the end of the season. Acosta was then loaned out to Plaza Colonia for the 2019 season. He left Villarreal at the end of 2019 and remained without a club until 10 August 2020, when he signed with Atenas de San Carlos.

== Death ==
On 6 March 2021, a day after his 25th birthday, Acosta disappeared after trying with his brother to swim across the Arroyo Pando, located in the Department of Canelones, Uruguay. Two days later, on 8 March 2021, his body was found, and was declared dead at the scene.
