= 2013 CONCACAF U-17 Championship squads =

== Barbados ==
Head Coach:

| No. | Pos. | Player | Date of birth (age) | Club |
|---|---|---|---|---|
| 1 | GK | Keon Harding | 1 November 1996 (aged 16) | |
| | GK | Rishi Panjwani | 2 May 1996 (aged 16) | |
| 5 | DF | Ranaldo Bailey | 5 July 1996 (aged 16) | |
| 3 | DF | Andre Blackman | 2 July 1996 (aged 16) | |
| 6 | DF | Damian Clarke | 31 January 1996 (aged 17) | |
| 2 | DF | Carl Hinkson | 14 April 1997 (aged 15) | |
| | DF | Timothy Maynard | 19 October 1997 (aged 15) | |
| 4 | DF | Ramar Millar | 14 March 1996 (aged 17) | |
| 18 | DF | Edward Okey | 22 March 1996 (aged 17) | |
| 15 | DF | Kyle Yearwood | 1 June 1997 (aged 15) | |
| 11 | MF | Shakille Belle | 21 October 1996 (aged 16) | |
| 8 | MF | Rosean Brathwaite | 16 February 1996 (aged 17) | |
| 9 | MF | Rasheed Clarke | 19 January 1996 (aged 17) | |
| | MF | Len Ross Davis | 24 March 1996 (aged 17) | |
| | MF | Ocean Sobers-Henry | 9 February 1996 (aged 17) | |
| 14 | MF | Sebastian Hunte | 21 October 1996 (aged 16) | |
| 17 | MF | T'Shane Lorde | 30 April 1997 (aged 15) | |
| 10 | FW | Shaquille Boyce | 13 June 1996 (aged 16) | |
| | FW | Niko Terho | 3 February 1996 (aged 17) | |
| | FW | Frederick Mulligan | 3 October 1996 (aged 16) | |

== Canada ==
Head Coach: (Canada) Sean Fleming

| No. | Pos. | Player | Date of birth (age) | Caps | Club |
|---|---|---|---|---|---|
| 1 | GK | Marco Carducci | 24 September 1996 (aged 16) | 0 | (Canada) Vancouver Whitecaps Residency |
| 18 | GK | Daniel Milton | 26 November 1996 (aged 16) | 0 | (Canada) Ajax Thunder |
| 12 | DF | Kevon Black | 11 February 1996 (aged 17) | 0 | (Canada) Toronto FC Academy |
| 4 | DF | Alex Comsia | 1 August 1996 (aged 16) | 0 | (Canada) Vancouver Whitecaps FC Residency |
| 13 | DF | Ian Fernandes | 5 April 1996 (aged 17) | 0 | (Canada) Toronto FC Academy |
| 2 | DF | Mathieu Laurent | 28 February 1996 (aged 17) | 0 | (Canada) Mississauga Soccer Club |
| 5 | DF | Aron Mkungilwa | 5 March 1996 (aged 17) | 0 | (Canada) Académie Impact Montréal |
| 3 | DF | Elias Roubos | 28 February 1996 (aged 17) | 0 | (Canada) Toronto FC Academy |
| 7 | MF | Marco Bustos | 22 April 1996 (aged 16) | 0 | (Canada) Vancouver Whitecaps FC Residency |
| 17 | MF | Mikaël Cantave | 25 October 1996 (aged 16) | 0 | (France) Orvault Sport Football |
| 15 | MF | Matthew Chow | 11 February 1996 (aged 17) | 0 | (Canada) Vancouver Whitecaps FC Residency |
| 16 | MF | Marco Dominguez | 25 February 1996 (aged 17) | 0 | (Canada) Braves d'Ahuntsic |
| 14 | MF | Andrew Gordon | 12 March 1997 (aged 16) | 0 | (Canada) Woodbridge Strikers |
| 11 | MF | Jordan Haynes | 17 January 1996 (aged 17) | 0 | (Canada) Vancouver Whitecaps FC Residency |
| 8 | MF | Jose Lopez | 4 March 1996 (aged 17) | 0 | (Canada) FC Edmonton Reserves |
| 20 | MF | Ali Musse | 1 January 1996 (aged 17) | 0 | (Canada) WSA Winnipeg |
| 6 | MF | Derick Sequeira | 20 January 1996 (aged 17) | 0 | (Canada) Toronto FC Academy |
| 10 | FW | Hanson Boakai | 28 October 1996 (aged 16) | 0 | (Canada) FC Edmonton |
| 9 | FW | Jordan Hamilton | 17 March 1996 (aged 17) | 3 | (Canada) Toronto FC Academy |
| 19 | FW | El Mehdi Ibn Brahim | 6 June 1996 (aged 16) | 0 | (Canada) Braves d'Ahuntsic |

== Costa Rica ==
Head Coach:

| No. | Pos. | Player | Date of birth (age) | Club |
|---|---|---|---|---|
| | GK | J. Jara | 5 January 1996 (aged 17) | |
| | GK | G. Salazar | 9 January 1996 (aged 17) | |
| | GK | M. Solano | 7 April 1996 (aged 16) | |
| | GK | J. Fabio | 14 October 1996 (aged 16) | |
| | DF | N. Shaquille | 29 March 1996 (aged 17) | |
| | DF | E. Marin | 31 March 1996 (aged 17) | |
| | DF | J. Martinez | 25 April 1996 (aged 16) | |
| | DF | H. Montero | 31 December 1996 (aged 16) | |
| | DF | J. Ruiz | 16 February 1996 (aged 17) | |
| | DF | S. Joshua | | |
| | DF | J. Hidalgo | 13 September 1997 (aged 15) | |
| | DF | J. Medina | 15 April 1996 (aged 16) | |
| | DF | D. Ruiz | 12 September 1996 (aged 16) | |
| | DF | F. Segura | 10 February 1996 (aged 17) | |
| | MF | D. Cortes | 15 May 1996 (aged 16) | |
| | MF | B. Burke | 16 March 1996 (aged 17) | |
| | MF | R. Leal | 14 January 1997 (aged 16) | |
| | MF | R. Miranda | 4 May 1996 (aged 16) | |
| | MF | A. Mora | 18 September 1996 (aged 16) | |
| | MF | F. Rosales | 14 August 1996 (aged 16) | |
| | MF | Y. Salas | 17 June 1996 (aged 16) | |
| | MF | J. Seas | 1 January 1996 (aged 17) | |
| | MF | R. Anthony | 7 February 1996 (aged 17) | |
| | MF | M. Jesus | 2 February 1996 (aged 17) | |
| | MF | J. David | 29 February 1996 (aged 17) | |
| | FW | A. Mendoza | 11 July 1997 (aged 15) | |
| | FW | R. Rivera | 5 January 1996 (aged 17) | |
| | FW | A. Zapata | 3 January 1997 (aged 16) | |
| | FW | G. Alberto | 30 January 1996 (aged 17) | |
| | FW | A. Alexander | 2 September 1996 (aged 16) | |

== Cuba ==
Head Coach:

| No. | Pos. | Player | Date of birth (age) | Club |
|---|---|---|---|---|
| | GK | Y. Ramírez | 26 July 1996 (aged 16) | |
| | GK | S. Bell | 2 March 1996 (aged 17) | |
| | DF | H. Adao | 3 February 1996 (aged 17) | |
| | DF | J. Machado | 4 March 1997 (aged 16) | |
| | DF | O. Madrigal | 14 October 1997 (aged 15) | |
| | DF | J. Vélez | 25 January 1996 (aged 17) | |
| | DF | N. Rodriguez | 14 April 1996 (aged 16) | |
| | MF | M. Hernández | 29 July 1996 (aged 16) | |
| | MF | T. Lorente | 9 February 1996 (aged 17) | |
| | MF | Y. Godinez | 16 January 1997 (aged 16) | |
| | MF | Y. Samonte | 5 January 1996 (aged 17) | |
| | MF | M. Díaz | 21 January 1996 (aged 17) | |
| | MF | D. Noda | 9 January 1996 (aged 17) | |
| | MF | Y. González | 12 February 1996 (aged 17) | |
| | MF | V. Alfonso | 27 April 1996 (aged 16) | |
| | MF | J. Labrada | 12 February 1996 (aged 17) | |
| | FW | R. Arancibia | 21 March 1996 (aged 17) | |
| | FW | D. Guerra | 29 April 1997 (aged 15) | |
| | FW | F. Valdés | 8 January 1997 (aged 16) | |

== Guatemala ==
Head Coach:

| No. | Pos. | Player | Date of birth (age) | Club |
|---|---|---|---|---|
| | GK | N. Hagen | 2 August 1996 (aged 16) | |
| | GK | P. Flores | 1 March 1996 (aged 17) | |
| | GK | J. Meda | 31 May 1996 (aged 16) | |
| | DF | W. Garcia | 24 February 1996 (aged 17) | |
| | DF | A. Yanes | 4 July 1997 (aged 15) | |
| | DF | D. Vivar | 29 July 1996 (aged 16) | |
| | DF | K. Curup | 4 February 1996 (aged 17) | |
| | DF | D. Garcia | 19 July 1996 (aged 16) | |
| | DF | K. Gutierrez | 14 February 1996 (aged 17) | |
| | DF | D. Ramirez | 24 February 1996 (aged 17) | |
| | MF | L. Samayoa | 30 March 1996 (aged 17) | |
| | MF | J. Ruiz | 30 May 1996 (aged 16) | |
| | MF | M. Rivera | 1 April 1996 (aged 17) | |
| | MF | E. Hernandez | 30 January 1996 (aged 17) | |
| | MF | J. Espinoza | 24 December 1996 (aged 16) | |
| | MF | S. Arana | 31 July 1996 (aged 16) | |
| | MF | J. Baldizon | 27 June 1996 (aged 16) | |
| | MF | E. Flores | 20 December 1996 (aged 16) | |
| | MF | B. Lucas | 5 January 1996 (aged 17) | |
| | MF | D. Meda | 4 July 1996 (aged 16) | |
| | MF | C. Ojeda | 18 March 1996 (aged 17) | |
| | MF | G. Perez | 21 February 1996 (aged 17) | |
| | MF | D. Robles | 21 April 1996 (aged 16) | |
| | FW | D. Ruano | 4 October 1996 (aged 16) | |
| | FW | C. Ortiz | 6 November 1996 (aged 16) | |
| | FW | M. Hernández | 1 December 1996 (aged 16) | |
| | FW | M. Aramburu | 10 March 1988 (aged 25) | |
| | FW | O. Barahona | 31 May 1996 (aged 16) | |
| | FW | E. Menendez | 21 January 1996 (aged 17) | |
| | FW | J. Vigil | 3 December 1997 (aged 15) | |

== Haiti ==
Head Coach:

| No. | Pos. | Player | Date of birth (age) | Club |
|---|---|---|---|---|
| | GK | L. Louis | 12 September 1996 (aged 16) | |
| | GK | P. Michel | 31 October 1996 (aged 16) | |
| | DF | R. Destine | 25 March 1996 (aged 17) | |
| | DF | M. Guillaume | 19 February 1996 (aged 17) | |
| | DF | J. Alexis | 4 July 1996 (aged 16) | |
| | DF | C. Joseph | 2 July 1996 (aged 16) | |
| | DF | R. Similien | 17 May 1996 (aged 16) | |
| | DF | J. Valentin | 1 February 1996 (aged 17) | |
| | DF | W. Saint Fleur | 25 January 1996 (aged 17) | |
| | DF | S. Federic | 19 June 1996 (aged 16) | |
| | MF | R. Etienne | 11 September 1996 (aged 16) | |
| | MF | J. Derival | 13 March 1996 (aged 17) | |
| | MF | R. Calixte | 27 October 1996 (aged 16) | |
| | MF | R. Jean-Marie | 19 December 1996 (aged 16) | |
| | MF | T. Philippe | 23 March 1996 (aged 17) | |
| | MF | E. Phede | 24 September 1996 (aged 16) | |
| | FW | J. Desire | 12 February 1997 (aged 16) | |
| | FW | A. Carlens | 28 June 1996 (aged 16) | |
| | FW | E. Clebert | 15 December 1996 (aged 16) | |
| | FW | G. Edouard | 16 February 1996 (aged 17) | |

== Honduras ==
Head Coach: (Honduras) José Valladares

| No. | Pos. | Player | Date of birth (age) | Club |
|---|---|---|---|---|
| | GK | Cristian Hernández | 22 September 1996 (aged 16) | (National Autonomous Federation of Football of Honduras) Valle |
| | GK | Fernando Cabrera | 9 March 1996 (aged 17) | (National Autonomous Federation of Football of Honduras) Real España |
| | DF | Kevin Álvarez | 3 August 1996 (aged 16) | (National Autonomous Federation of Football of Honduras) Olimpia |
| | DF | Roberto Hernández | | (National Autonomous Federation of Football of Honduras) Olimpia |
| | DF | Ismael Santos | | (National Autonomous Federation of Football of Honduras) Olimpia |
| | DF | José Murillo | 6 June 1996 (aged 16) | (National Autonomous Federation of Football of Honduras) Motagua |
| | DF | Álvaro Romero | 10 February 1997 (aged 16) | (National Autonomous Federation of Football of Honduras) Real España |
| | DF | Deybi Flores | 16 June 1996 (aged 16) | (National Autonomous Federation of Football of Honduras) Motagua |
| | MF | Christopher Alegría | 5 January 1996 (aged 17) | (National Autonomous Federation of Football of Honduras) Real España |
| | MF | Devron García | 5 February 1996 (aged 17) | (National Autonomous Federation of Football of Honduras) Victoria |
| | MF | Eric Gallegos | 8 January 1996 (aged 17) | (National Autonomous Federation of Football of Honduras) Motagua |
| | MF | Steven Ramos | 1 October 1996 (aged 16) | (National Autonomous Federation of Football of Honduras) Real España |
| | MF | Isaac Borjas | 7 April 1996 (aged 16) | (National Autonomous Federation of Football of Honduras) Valencia |
| | MF | Michael Montero | | (National Autonomous Federation of Football of Honduras) Vida |
| | MF | Kevin López | 3 February 1996 (aged 17) | (National Autonomous Federation of Football of Honduras) Motagua |
| | MF | Cristian Argueta | 2 September 1996 (aged 16) | (National Autonomous Federation of Football of Honduras) La Paz |
| | FW | Brayan Velásquez | 8 May 1996 (aged 16) | (National Autonomous Federation of Football of Honduras) Olimpia |
| | FW | Jorge Bodden | 12 June 1996 (aged 16) | (National Autonomous Federation of Football of Honduras) Valencia |
| | FW | Alberth Elis | 12 February 1996 (aged 17) | (National Autonomous Federation of Football of Honduras) Olimpia |
| | FW | Renbramdt Flores | 12 May 1997 (aged 15) | (National Autonomous Federation of Football of Honduras) Olimpia |

== Jamaica ==
Head coach: Wendell Downswell

| No. | Pos. | Player | Date of birth (age) | Caps | Goals | Club |
|---|---|---|---|---|---|---|
| | DF | Tyshan Hill | 21 April 1996 (aged 16) | 2 | | (Jamaica Football Federation) Montego Bay United F.C. |
| | DF | Oneil Anderson | 21 March 1997 (aged 15) | 1 | | (Jamaica Football Federation) Santos FC |
| | MF | Raffique Bryan | 13 May 1996 (aged 16) | 1 | | (Jamaica Football Federation) Arnett Gardens F.C. |
| | MF | Ryan Miller | 5 September 1996 (aged 16) | 2 | | (Jamaica Football Federation) Cavaliers SC |
| | MF | Seigel Knight | 14 October 1996 (aged 16) | 2 | | (Jamaica Football Federation) Portmore United F.C. |
| | FW | Michael Seaton | 1 May 1996 (aged 16) | 2 | 2 | (United States Soccer Federation) D.C. United |
| 2 | FW | Junior Flemmings | 16 June 1996 (aged 16) | 5 | 4 | (Jamaica Football Federation) Tivoli Gardens FC |
| | FW | I'Ishmale Currie | 6 June 1996 (aged 16) | 2 | | (Jamaica Football Federation) Portmore United F.C. |
| | MF | Anson Lewis | 13 March 1996 (aged 16) | 4 | 2 | (Jamaica Football Federation) Cavalier FC |
| | MF | Martin Davis | 11 October 1996 (aged 16) | 1 | | (Royal Spanish Football Federation) Next Generation |
| | DF | Nathaniel Leslie | 27 February 1996 (aged 16) | 1 | | (Jamaica Football Federation) Waterhouse F.C. |
| | MF | Maalique Foster | 5 November 1996 (aged 16) | 1 | | (Jamaica Football Federation) Portmore United FC |
| | DF | Zachary Jones | 3 April 1996 (aged 17) | 0 | 0 | (United States Soccer Federation) Georgia United |
| | DF | Malcolm Stewart | 4 February 1996 (aged 17) | 0 | 0 | (United States Soccer Federation) Georgia United |
| 18 | GK | Nicholas Nelson | 6 April 1996 (aged 17) | 0 | 0 | (United States Soccer Federation) Georgia United |
| 4 | DF | Kyle Anderson | 10 July 1997 (aged 15) | 1 | | (Jamaica Football Federation) Montego Bay United F.C. |
| | FW | Malcolm Dixon | 1 January 1997 (aged 16) | 0 | | (United States Soccer Federation) New York Red Bulls Academy |
| | DF | Rushane McClymont | 14 February 1996 (aged 16) | 2 | | (Jamaica Football Federation) Appleton Estate FC |
| | MF | Luca Levee | 21 February 1996 (aged 16) | 1 | | (Royal Spanish Football Federation) Next Generation |
| | MF | Khallil Stewart | 1 January 1996 (aged 17) | 0 | 0 | (United States Soccer Federation) Concord Fire |

== Mexico ==
Head Coach: (Mexico) Raúl Gutiérrez

| No. | Pos. | Player | Date of birth (age) | Club |
|---|---|---|---|---|
| 1 | GK | Raúl Gudiño | 22 April 1996 (aged 16) | (Mexican Football Federation) Guadalajara |
| 12 | GK | Edson Reséndez | 12 January 1996 (aged 17) | (Mexican Football Federation) Monterrey |
| 3 | DF | Salomón Wbias | 9 March 1996 (aged 17) | (Mexican Football Federation) Pachuca |
| 4 | DF | Pedro Terán | 24 July 1996 (aged 16) | (Mexican Football Federation) Atlas |
| 5 | DF | José Robles | 16 July 1996 (aged 16) | (Mexican Football Federation) UNAM |
| 14 | DF | Ramsés Gómez | 13 January 1996 (aged 17) | (Mexican Football Federation) Atlas |
| 15 | DF | Christian Tovar | 13 January 1996 (aged 17) | (Mexican Football Federation) Santos Laguna |
| 16 | DF | Érick Aguirre | 23 February 1997 (aged 16) | (Mexican Football Federation) Morelia |
| 6 | MF | José Almanza | 24 February 1996 (aged 17) | (Mexican Football Federation) Pachuca |
| 7 | MF | Luis Enrique Hernández | 10 February 1996 (aged 17) | (Mexican Football Federation) Pachuca |
| 8 | MF | Iván Ochoa | 13 August 1996 (aged 16) | (Mexican Football Federation) Pachuca |
| 10 | MF | Ulises Rivas | 25 January 1996 (aged 17) | (Mexican Football Federation) Santos Laguna |
| 13 | MF | Erich Hernández | 16 March 1996 (aged 17) | (Mexican Football Federation) Guadalajara |
| 18 | MF | Juan Carlos Ortega | 29 February 1996 (aged 17) | (Mexican Football Federation) Pachuca |
| 20 | MF | Manuel Tejeda | 10 February 1996 (aged 17) | (Mexican Football Federation) Santos Laguna |
| 9 | FW | Alejandro Díaz | 27 January 1996 (aged 17) | (Mexican Football Federation) América |
| 11 | FW | Ulises Jaimes | 20 April 1996 (aged 16) | (Mexican Football Federation) Morelia |
| 17 | FW | Marco Granados | 29 September 1996 (aged 16) | (Mexican Football Federation) Guadalajara |
| 19 | FW | Víctor Zúñiga | 21 March 1996 (aged 17) | (Mexican Football Federation) Cruz Azul |

== Panama ==
Head Coach:

| No. | Pos. | Player | Date of birth (age) | Club |
|---|---|---|---|---|
| | GK | R. Cueto | 23 March 1996 (aged 17) | |
| | GK | E. De La Rosa | 8 March 1996 (aged 17) | |
| | GK | H. Ortega | 26 March 1996 (aged 17) | |
| | GK | A. Reyes | 28 February 1996 (aged 17) | |
| | DF | J. Araya | 3 January 1996 (aged 17) | |
| | DF | J. Carrasquilla | 3 June 1996 (aged 16) | |
| | DF | J. Diaz | 29 October 1996 (aged 16) | |
| | DF | J. Marroqui | 9 March 1996 (aged 17) | |
| | DF | A. Navarro | 5 July 1996 (aged 16) | |
| | MF | J. De Gracia | 11 May 1996 (aged 16) | |
| | MF | I. Díaz | 12 May 1997 (aged 15) | |
| | MF | E. Zorrilla | 14 May 1996 (aged 16) | |
| | MF | L. Alain | 26 March 1996 (aged 17) | |
| | MF | L. Cañate | 9 August 1996 (aged 16) | |
| | MF | E. Dominguez | 15 February 1996 (aged 17) | |
| | MF | K. Galvan | 10 March 1996 (aged 17) | |
| | MF | F. General | 19 April 1996 (aged 16) | |
| | MF | V. Gonzalez | 10 April 1996 (aged 16) | |
| | MF | G. Herrera | 15 February 1997 (aged 16) | |
| | MF | Y. Menchaca | 18 April 1996 (aged 16) | |
| | MF | M. Molina | 6 January 1997 (aged 16) | |
| | MF | G. Nuñez | 7 August 1996 (aged 16) | |
| | MF | S. Santos | 4 January 1998 (aged 15) | |
| | MF | W. Wald | 2 February 1996 (aged 17) | |
| | FW | L. Zuñiga | 1 April 1997 (aged 16) | |
| | FW | M. Gil | 9 February 1997 (aged 16) | |
| | FW | J. Jaramillo | 14 January 1997 (aged 16) | |

== Trinidad and Tobago ==
Coach: Shawn Cooper

| No. | Pos. | Player | Date of birth (age) | Caps | Goals | Club |
|---|---|---|---|---|---|---|
| 21 | GK | Kevin John | | | | (Trinidad and Tobago Football Association) Southern F.A. |
| 1 | GK | Johan Welch | | | | (United States Soccer Federation) Houston Dynamo |
| 5 | DF | Martieon Watson | | | 1 | (Trinidad and Tobago Football Association) W Connection |
| 4 | DF | Josiah Trimmingham | | | 1 | (Trinidad and Tobago Football Association) San Juan Jabloteh |
| | DF | Leland Archer | | | | (Trinidad and Tobago Football Association) St. Ann's Rangers |
| 3 | DF | Maurice Ford | | | | (Trinidad and Tobago Football Association) Caledonia AIA |
| | DF | Stephan Spicer | | | | (Trinidad and Tobago Football Association) SKHY FC |
| 2 | DF | Shannon Gomez | | | | (Trinidad and Tobago Football Association) San Juan Jabloteh |
| 8 | MF | Jabari Mitchell | | | 4 | (Trinidad and Tobago Football Association) W Connection |
| 6 | MF | Brendon Creed (captain) | | | 3 | (Trinidad and Tobago Football Association) SKHY FC |
| 15 | MF | Jarred Dass | | | | (Trinidad and Tobago Football Association) W Connection |
| 11 | MF | Dre Fortune | | | 1 | (United States Soccer Federation) Needham Broughton High School |
| 16 | MF | Mani Walcott | | | | (United States Soccer Federation) Eleanor Roosevelt High School |
| 14 | MF | Matthew Woo Ling | | | 1 | (Trinidad and Tobago Football Association) W Connection |
| 18 | MF | Levi García | | | | (Trinidad and Tobago Football Association) T&TEC FC |
| 19 | MF | Kishun Seecharan | | | 4 | (Trinidad and Tobago Football Association) 1st FC Santa Rosa |
| 7 | MF | Aikim Andrews | | | 2 | (Trinidad and Tobago Football Association) San Juan Jabloteh |
| 9 | FW | Brent Sam | | | 7 | (Trinidad and Tobago Football Association) Police FC |
| 10 | FW | Akeem Garcia (vice captain) | | | 2 | (Trinidad and Tobago Football Association) San Juan Jabloteh |
| 12 | FW | Weah Adams | | | 2 | (Trinidad and Tobago Football Association) Roxborough Lakers |

== United States ==
Head Coach: (United States) Richie Williams

| No. | Pos. | Player | Date of birth (age) | Club |
|---|---|---|---|---|
| | GK | Jeff Caldwell | 20 February 1996 (aged 17) | (United States Soccer Federation) North Carolina Fusion |
| | GK | Evan Louro | 19 January 1996 (aged 17) | (United States Soccer Federation) New York Red Bulls |
| | DF | Conor Donovan | 8 January 1996 (aged 17) | (United States Soccer Federation) NC Alliance |
| | DF | Justen Glad | 28 February 1997 (aged 16) | (United States Soccer Federation) Real Salt Lake AZ |
| | DF | Shaquell Moore (C) | 2 November 1996 (aged 16) | (United States Soccer Federation) Unattached |
| | DF | Tommy Redding | 24 January 1997 (aged 16) | (United States Soccer Federation) FC America Premier |
| | DF | John Requejo | 23 May 1996 (aged 16) | (United States Soccer Federation) Real So Cal |
| | DF | Peter Schropp | 20 January 1997 (aged 16) | (United States Soccer Federation) Omaha FC |
| | MF | Corey Baird | 30 January 1996 (aged 17) | (United States Soccer Federation) San Diego Surf |
| | MF | Junior Flores | 26 March 1996 (aged 17) | (German Football Association) Borussia Dortmund |
| | MF | Angel Heredia | 2 September 1996 (aged 16) | (United States Soccer Federation) San Jose Earthquakes |
| | MF | Christopher Lema | 5 August 1996 (aged 16) | (United States Soccer Federation) New York Red Bulls |
| | MF | Elijah Martin | 4 July 1996 (aged 16) | (United States Soccer Federation) Cal Odyssey |
| | MF | Joel Soñora | 4 July 1996 (aged 16) | (Argentine Football Association) Boca Juniors |
| | MF | Tyler Turner | 4 March 1996 (aged 17) | (United States Soccer Federation) South Central Premier |
| | FW | Mukwelle Akale | 18 January 1997 (aged 16) | (United States Soccer Federation) Minnesota Thunder |
| | FW | Sebastian Elney | 26 June 1997 (aged 15) | (United States Soccer Federation) Boca United |
| | FW | Rubio Rubin | 1 March 1996 (aged 17) | (United States Soccer Federation) Portland Timbers |
| | FW | Ahinga Selemani | 1 March 1996 (aged 17) | (United States Soccer Federation) Crew Soccer Academy Wolves |
| | FW | Alan Winn | 18 February 1996 (aged 17) | (United States Soccer Federation) Solar Chelsea SC |
