= Mercosur Parliament =

Parliamentary institution of the Mercosur trade bloc

Coordinates: 34.914094057516°S 56.17103916929798°W

Mercosur Parliament Parlamento del Mercosur Parlamento do Mercosul
- 20th Mercosur Parliament
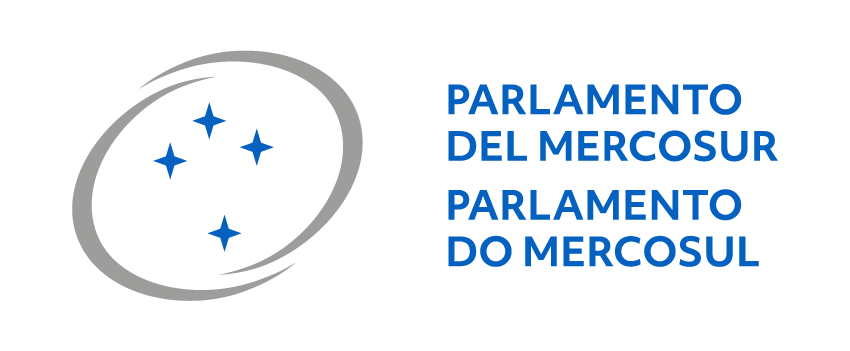

Type
- Type: Consultive legislature

Leadership
- President: (Paraguay) Rodrigo Gamarra since January 1st, 2026
- Vice Presidents: (Argentina) Gustavo Arrieta (Bolivia) Luis Zuñiga (Paraguay) Derlis Maidana (Uruguay) Nicolás Vieira

Structure
- Seats: 144 MPs
- Political groups: Argentina (44): UxP (20); LLA (15); JxC (3); HNP (1); PER (1); Non-inscrit (2); Bolivia (9): MAS-IPSP (6); CC (2); Creemos (1); Brazil (47): PT (4); PDT (2); PL (2); PP (2); PSD (2); R (2); MDB (1); PRD (1); PCdoB (1); PSB (1); PSDB (1); UNIÃO (1); Paraguay (20): ANR-PC (11); PLRA (4); PPH (2); PEN (1); Uruguay (24): FA (8); PN (6); CA (2); PC (2)

Elections
- Last election: Argentine: 2023

Meeting place
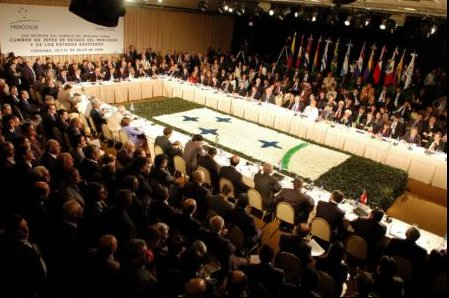
- Montevideo, Uruguay

Website
- parlamentomercosur.org

The Mercosur Parliament (Spanish: Parlamento del Mercosur, Portuguese: Parlamento do Mercosul), known also as Parlasur, or Parlasul, is the parliamentary institution of the Mercosur trade bloc. The 20th parliament is composed of 144 MPs, 44 from Argentina, 47 from Brazil, 9 from Bolivia, 20 from Paraguay and 24 from Uruguay.

== History ==
The creation of the Mercosur Parliament traces back to a 2002 process of establishing bodies and procedures aimed at the institutionalization and political autonomy of the bloc.

During the XXVII Meeting of MERCOSUR Heads of State and Government on 17 December 2004, at Ouro Preto, Minas Gerais, the Common Market Council (CMC) instructed the Joint Parliamentary Commission (CPC) to write a protocol establishing the Mercosur Parliament, recommending its completion until the end of 2006. The CPC created the project in advance and on 9 December 2005, the presidents of Argentina, Brazil, Paraguay and Uruguay signed the Constitutive Protocol of the Mercosur Parliament, creating the new body.

The first session of the Parliament was meant to be held before 31 December 2006, but was only held on 7 May 2007, replacing the CPC. In June 2008, the MPs held their first parliamentary session outside the Mercosur headquarters in Montevideo, on the city of San Miguel de Tucumán, where the XXXV Meeting of Mercosur Heads of State was also being held.

Starting with the 2008 Paraguayan general elections, members of the Parliament were directly elected. It was expected that Brazilians would be the next to elect their representatives through direct vote, during the Brazilian 2010 general elections, and Argentines, in the Argentine 2011 general elections, but both elections were not held. The first simultaneous election was expected to occur in 2015.

== Members ==
The group initially consisted of Argentina, Brazil, Paraguay and Uruguay, Bolivia became a full member in 2024 and Venezuela in 2014 (although they have been indefinitely suspended since then)

Only full members are entitled to have MPs in the Parliament, as such, the associated member states (Chile, Colombia, Ecuador, Guyana, Panama, Peru and Suriname) are not present in the Mercosur Parliament.

- Argentina
- Bolivia
- Brazil
- Paraguay
- Uruguay
- Venezuela (suspended)

== See also ==
- Latin American Parliament
- South American Parliament (proposed)
- Bank of the South
- Central American Parliament
- United Nations Parliamentary Assembly
