= List of members of the Senate of Paraguay =

This is a list of the current members of the Senate of Paraguay, the upper house of the Congress of Paraguay. Senators serve five-year terms, elected through proportional representation.

== List ==
Party	Image	Senator	Since	Time in office	Votes (2023)	Notes
Colorado Party		Juan Afara	30 June 2018	8 years, 17 days	21,302	
Colorado Party		Antonio Barrios	30 June 2018	8 years, 17 days	—N/a	Replaced Juan Carlos Baruja, who resigned to serve in the Peña administration.
Colorado Party		Natalicio Chase	30 June 2023	3 years, 17 days	30,165	
Colorado Party		Zenaida Delgado	30 June 2023	3 years, 17 days	12,869	Elected Senator for the National Crusade Party, later joined the Colorado Party.
Colorado Party		Pedro Díaz Verón	30 June 2023	3 years, 17 days	23,059	
Colorado Party		Juan Carlos Galaverna	14 August 2023	2 years, 337 days	—N/a	Replaced Carlos Giménez, who resigned to serve in the Peña administration.
Colorado Party		Erico Galeano	30 June 2023	3 years, 17 days	27,977	
Colorado Party		Patrick Kemper	30 June 2018	8 years, 17 days	7,315	Elected Senator for the Hagamos Political Party, later joined the Colorado Party.
Colorado Party		Gustavo Leite	30 June 2023	3 years, 17 days	15,978	
Colorado Party		Derlis Maidana	30 June 2023	3 years, 17 days	76,069	
Colorado Party		Carlos Núñez Agüero	30 June 2023	3 years, 17 days	54,498	
Colorado Party		Basilio Núñez	30 June 2023	3 years, 17 days	31,631	
Colorado Party		Derlis Osorio	30 June 2013	13 years, 17 days	57,361	
Colorado Party		Silvio Ovelar	5 August 2004	21 years, 346 days	282,237	
Colorado Party		Blanca Ovelar	30 June 2013	13 years, 17 days	17,864	
Colorado Party		Luis Petengill	30 June 2023	3 years, 17 days	61,168	
Colorado Party		Ramón Retamozo	3 August 2023	2 years, 348 days	—N/a	Replaced Enrique Riera, who resigned to serve in the Peña administration.
Colorado Party		Hernán Rivas	30 June 2023	3 years, 17 days	25,178	
Colorado Party		Oscar Salomón	30 June 2013	13 years, 17 days	56,504	
Colorado Party		Arnaldo Samaniego	30 June 2023	3 years, 17 days	35,022	
Colorado Party		Lilian Samaniego	16 November 2004	21 years, 243 days	54,720	
Colorado Party		Colym Soroka	30 June 2023	3 years, 17 days	29,555	
Colorado Party		Lizarella Valiente	30 June 2023	3 years, 17 days	56,047	
Colorado Party		Mario Varela	30 June 2023	3 years, 17 days	47,925	
Colorado Party		Javier Vera	20 July 2023	2 years, 362 days	—N/a	Replaced Rafael "Mbururú" Esquivel. Initially sworn in as Senator for the National Crusade Party, later became an independent and then joined the Colorado Party.
Colorado Party		Javier Zacarías Irún	30 June 2018	8 years, 17 days	22,567	
Authentic Radical Liberal Party		Hermelinda Alvarenga	30 June 2018	8 years, 17 days	26,296	
Authentic Radical Liberal Party		Dionisio Amarilla	30 June 2023	3 years, 17 days	24,880	
Authentic Radical Liberal Party		Líder Amarilla	30 June 2023	3 years, 17 days	24,383	
Authentic Radical Liberal Party		Celeste Amarilla	30 June 2023	3 years, 17 days	42,207	
Authentic Radical Liberal Party		Salyn Buzarquis	30 June 2018	8 years, 17 days	125,096	
Authentic Radical Liberal Party		Noelia Cabrera	30 June 2023	3 years, 17 days	22,312	
Authentic Radical Liberal Party		José Ledesma	30 June 2018	8 years, 17 days	25,241	
Authentic Radical Liberal Party		Edgar López	30 June 2023	3 years, 17 days	63,077	
Authentic Radical Liberal Party		Eduardo Nakayama	30 June 2023	3 years, 17 days	28,499	
Authentic Radical Liberal Party		Sergio Rojas	30 June 2023	3 years, 17 days	71,072	
Authentic Radical Liberal Party		Ever Villalba	30 June 2023	3 years, 17 days	37,734	
National Crusade Party		José Oviedo	30 June 2023	3 years, 17 days	18,100	
National Crusade Party		Yolanda Paredes	30 June 2023	3 years, 17 days	141,102	
Progressive Democratic Party		Rafael Filizzola	30 June 2023	3 years, 17 days	28,251	
National Encounter Party		Ignacio Iramain	15 February 2024	2 years, 152 days	—N/a	Replaced Kattya González after her impeachment.
Beloved Fatherland Party		Orlando Penner	30 June 2023	3 years, 17 days	14,185	
Guasú Front		Esperanza Martínez	30 June 2013	13 years, 17 days	11,735	
National Democratic Conscience		Rubén Velázquez	30 June 2023	3 years, 17 days	18,485	
Independent		Norma Aquino	30 June 2023	3 years, 17 days	12,637	Elected as a Senator for the National Crusade Party, later became an independent aligned with the Colorado Party.
