= Amarilla =

Amarilla is a surname. Notable people with the surname include:

- Alberto Guani Amarilla (born 1959), Uruguayan diplomat
- Ángel Amarilla (born 1981), Paraguayan footballer
- Carlos Amarilla (born 1970), Paraguayan football referee
- Celeste Amarilla (born 1964), Paraguayan politician
- Ever Amarilla (born 1984), Paraguayan footballer
- Florencio Amarilla (1935–2012), Paraguayan footballer, coach and later actor
- Gerardo Amarilla (born 1969), Uruguayan politician
- José Amarilla, (born 1985), Argentinian footballer
- Luis Amarilla (born 1995), Paraguayan footballer
- Néstor Amarilla (born 1980), Paraguayan dramatist and playwright
- Raúl Amarilla Romero (born 1988), Paraguayan footballer
- Raúl Vicente Amarilla (born 1960), Paraguayan footballer

== See also ==
- Barba amarilla (disambiguation)
- Carretera Amarilla / Tesalónica (Seville Metro), interchange station between metro services of Seville subway system, Andalusia
- Casa Amarilla, railway station in the district of La Boca, Buenos Aires
- Fuerza Amarilla S.C., Ecuadorian football club based in Machala, Ecuador
- Ithomia amarilla, ithomiine butterfly from the subfamily Danainae
- La Ola Amarilla, professional wrestling group
- Mata Amarilla Formation, formation is a stratigraphic division of Patagonia, Argentina
- Tierra Amarilla, New Mexico, small unincorporated community near the Carson National Forest in the northern part of the U.S. state of New Mexico
- Tierra Amarilla Air Force Station, closed United States Air Force General Surveillance Radar station
- Tierra Amarilla, Chile, Chilean commune and city in Copiapó Province, Atacama Region
- Tierra Amarilla Historic District, historic district which was listed on the US-National Register of Historic Places
