= Christian Tovar =

Mexican footballer (born 1996)

Personal information
- Full name: Christian Omar Tovar Delgado
- Date of birth: 13 January 1996 (age 30)
- Place of birth: Saltillo, Coahuila, Mexico
- Height: 1.75 m (5 ft 9 in)
- Position: Midfielder

Youth career
- 2011–2015: Santos Laguna

Senior career*
Years	Team	Apps	(Gls)
2015–2017	Santos Laguna	0	(0)
2015–2016	→ Zacatepec (loan)	13	(0)
2016	→ Tampico Madero (loan)	7	(0)
2017	→ Alebrijes (loan)	11	(1)
2017–2019	Tampico Madero	39	(1)
2020	Gavilanes	4	(0)
2020	Industriales Naucalpan F.C.	0	(0)
2021–2022	La Piedad	14	(1)
2022	Durango	9	(0)
2023	Yalmakán	10	(0)
2023	La Piedad	12	(0)
2024	Saltillo	15	(0)

International career
2013	Mexico U17	7	(0)
Medal record
Men's football
Representing Mexico
FIFA U-17 World Cup
Runner-up	2013 United Arab Emirates	Team
CONCACAF U-17 Championship
Winner	2013 Panama	Team
- * Club domestic league appearances and goals as of 18:09, 15 January 2024 (UTC)

Christian Omar Tovar Delgado (born 13 January 1996) is a Mexican professional footballer who plays as a midfielder for Saltillo.

== Club career ==
=== Early career ===
After playing for local club Tiburones Rojos, Tovar rose through the Santos Laguna youth ranks, playing 64 matches (11 goals) total for the U15, U17 and U20 teams. In February, he played in the 2013 Torneo di Viareggio, an annual international youth tournament in Italy, and scored a goal in a 5-0 group stage win over Rijeka. He participated in the 2014 and 2015 versions as well. Santos also won the 2013 Liga MX U20 Torneo Apertura in December 2013.

=== Professional career ===
Tovar was promoted to the Santos first team, and immediately loaned out to second division team Zacatepec in June 2015. He made his professional debut in a 1–1 draw on 31 July 2015 against Cimarrones de Sonora, where he got a yellow card. After a successful loan spell with Zacatepec, Santos loaned Tovar to Tampico Madero.

Tovar signed with Alacranes de Durango in June 2022.

== International career ==
Tovar was selected to represent his country at the 2013 CONCACAF U-17 Championship. He played in one match, a 2-0 group stage win over Honduras. Mexico won the tournament, qualifying for the 2013 FIFA U-17 World Cup.

At the World Cup, Tovar played in six games (one as a starter), registering two assists. His first came in the 6-1 group stage loss vs. Nigeria, and then again in the 2–0 win against Italy in the Round of 16. Mexico eventually lost in the final.

== Honours ==
=== National team ===
Mexico U17

- CONCACAF U-17 Championship

Champion : 2013

- FIFA U-17 World Cup

runner-up : 2013
