= Edson Reséndez =

Mexican footballer (born 1996)

Personal information
- Full name: Edson Alan Reséndez Sánchez
- Date of birth: 12 January 1996 (age 30)
- Place of birth: Guasave, Sinaloa, Mexico
- Height: 1.81 m (5 ft 11 in)
- Position: Goalkeeper

Team information
- Current team: Correcaminos
- Number: 24

Youth career
- 2011–2015: Monterrey

Senior career*
| Years | Team | Apps | (Gls) |
| 2015–2021 | Monterrey | 2 | (0) |
| 2021 | → Raya2 (loan) | 15 | (0) |
| 2022–2023 | Cancún | 36 | (0) |
| 2024–2025 | Aucas | 16 | (0) |
| 2026– | Correcaminos | 0 | (0) |
Medal record
Men's football
Representing Mexico
FIFA U-17 World Cup
| Runner-up | 2013 United Arab Emirates | Team |
CONCACAF U-17 Championship
| Winner | 2013 Panama | Team |
- * Club domestic league appearances and goals as of 20 August 2025

Edson Alan Reséndez Sánchez (Note: In this Spanish name, the first or paternal surname is Reséndez and the second or maternal family name is Sánchez.) (born 12 January 1996) is a Mexican professional footballer who plays as a goalkeeper for Liga de Expansión MX club Correcaminos.

== Honours ==
Monterrey

- Liga MX: Apertura 2019
- Copa MX: Apertura 2017
- CONCACAF Champions League: 2019

Mexico Youth

- CONCACAF U-17 Championship: 2013
- FIFA U-17 World Cup runner-up: 2013
- CONCACAF U-20 Championship: 2015
