= Celeste Amarilla =

Paraguayan lawyer and politician (born 1964)

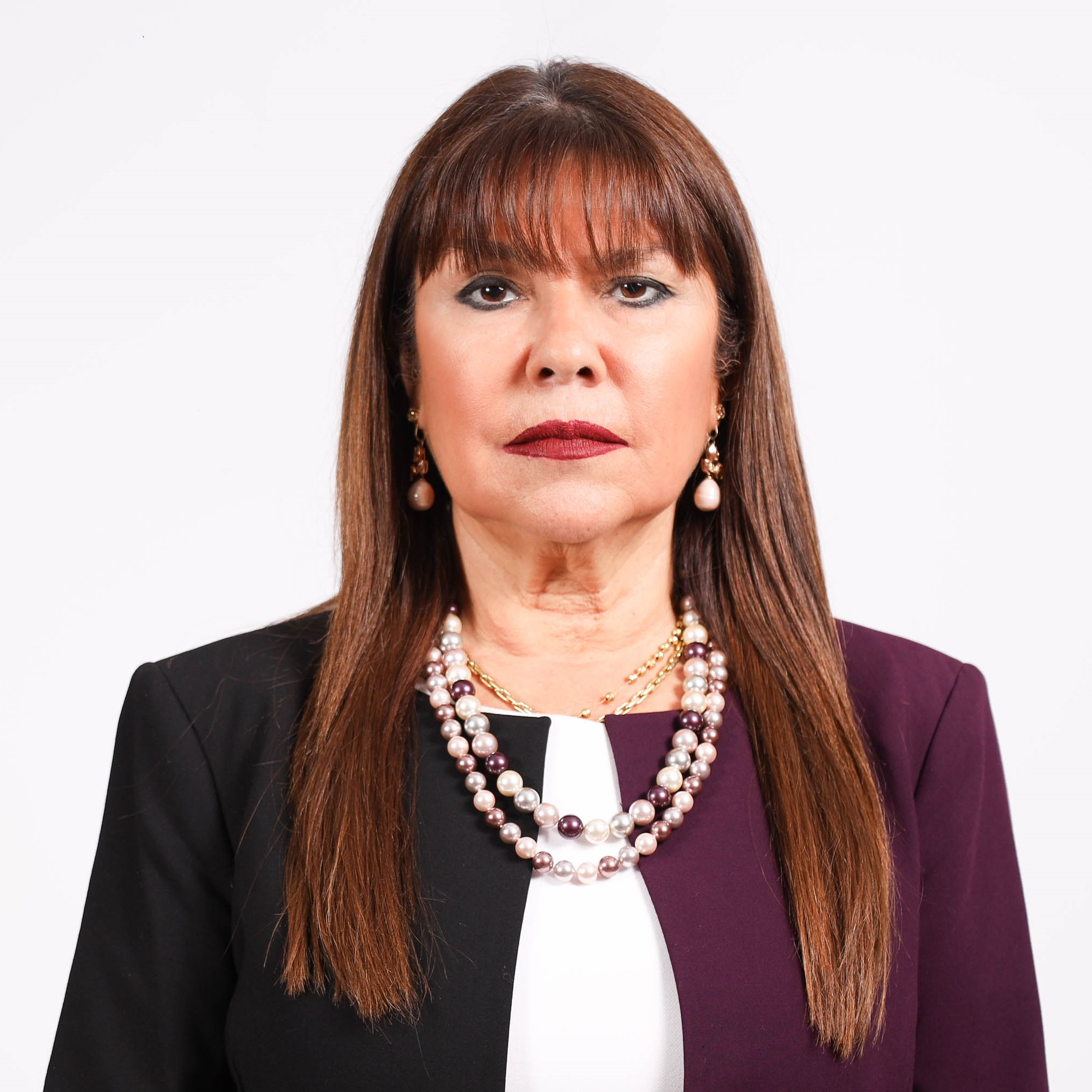
- Official portrait, 2023

Senator of Paraguay
- Incumbent
- Assumed office 30 June 2023

Deputy of Paraguay
- In office 1 July 2018 – 30 June 2023
- Constituency: Asunción

Personal details
- Born: Celeste Josefina Amarilla Goitia; October 21, 1964 (age 61) San Juan Bautista, Paraguay
- Party: PLRA
- Spouse: Franklin Boccia (m. 1988; died 2015)
- Children: 1
- Occupation: Lawyer; politician

Celeste Josefina Amarilla Goitia (Note: In this name that follows Hispanic American naming customs, the first or paternal surname is Amarilla and the second or maternal family name is Goitia.) (born 21 October 1964) is a Paraguayan lawyer and politician who has been serving as a senator since the 2023 general election. A native of San Juan Bautista in the department of Misiones, she represents the Authentic Radical Liberal Party (PLRA).

== Early life ==
Amarilla received her education at the Collège de l'Immaculée Conception, a French primary and secondary school in Asunción. In 1982, she enrolled in the Faculty of Law, Social Sciences, and Politics at the National University of Asunción (UNA), where she completed her first year of studies. She resumed her legal education in 2004 at the Universidad del Norte and earned her law degree in 2008. Additionally, she completed a postgraduate program in political science through the Rector's Office of the National University of Asunción (UNA).

== Career ==
Amarilla helped establish the Authentic Radical Liberal Party (PLRA) and its youth wing, Authentic Radical Liberal Youth (JLRA) in 1982. She participated in the party's Popular Mobilization for Change movement and held several public positions, including Director of Finance for the Municipality of Fernando de la Mora (1991–1995), president of the 28th Marshal Estigarribia Committee of Asunción (1995–1997), and Secretary of Childhood, Sports, and Social Action of the Central Department (1999–2003).

=== Chamber of Deputies ===
Between 1 July 2018 and 30 June 2023, Amarilla served as a deputy representing the Capital district. In 2020, she was suspended for 60 days from her parliamentary duties and salary, by a vote of the Chamber of Deputies, after she claimed that up to 70 deputies had bought their seats.

=== Senate ===
In the 2023 Paraguayan general election held on 30 April, Amarilla was elected to a five-year term in the Senate. (Note: Paraguay's 45 senators are elected from a single national constituency using closed list proportional representation.) In 2025, she, along with Ignacio Iramain Chilavert and Eduardo Nakayama, attempted to initiate impeachment proceedings against fellow PLRA senator Noelia Cabrera, alleging nepotism based on newspaper reporting. In response the liberocartista faction of the party—of which Cabrera was a member—made counter accusation of nepotism based on a distant relative of Amarilla's being employed by the senate, which Amarilla described as libelous.

Amarilla supported 2026 proposals to reform the Public Pension Fund, criticising the PLRA for its opposition, described the party as being in a state of "induced coma". She caused some controversy when she called teachers opposed to the plan "donkeys and mediocre" and as responsible for the poor state of education.

=== Kylian Mbappé remarks ===
In July 2026, Amarilla was criticised for racist remarks made against French footballer Kylian Mbappé after France defeated Paraguay in a knock-out match during the 2026 FIFA World Cup. She referenced multiple racial stereotypes in her later deleted comments, stating that the footballer was a brute, illiterate, a colonised Cameroonian, and raised on "coconuts instead of mother's milk" in the company of chimpanzees.

Mbappé condemned Amarilla as "despicable" and stated she did not represent Paraguay. The French Football Federation and French public prosecutors launched an investigation into Amarilla, which she rejected as gender-based violence. Amarilla referenced the imprisonment of Ronaldinho in Paraguay in 2020, saying Mbappé should not underestimate Paraguayans, expressing her willingness to pursue legal action, and adding that she had also experienced racial discrimination while in Europe. The Paraguayan government, FIFA, and the OHCHR publicly condemned Amarilla's comments and voiced their support for Mbappé. On 8 July, the Paraguayan Senate subsequently passed a motion officially condemning her remarks as racially discriminatory.

== Personal life ==
Amarilla was married to PLRA politician Franklin Boccia from 1988 until his death in 2015.
