= Maidana =

Maidana is a surname. Notable people with the surname include:

- Alexandro Maidana (born 2005), Paraguayan footballer
- Cristian Maidana, Argentine footballer
- Derlis Maidana (born 1975), Paraguayan politician
- Fabián Maidana, Argentine professional boxer
- Iago Maidana. Brazilian footballer
- Jonathan Maidana, Argentine footballer
- Julián Edgardo Maidana, Argentine footballer
- Marcos René Maidana, Argentine professional boxer
- Ruben Maidana, Argentine Olympian
- Roberto Maidana, Argentine journalist

== See also ==
- Maidana (moth), synonym of a genus of moths
