= Iván Ochoa (footballer) =

Mexican footballer (born 1996)

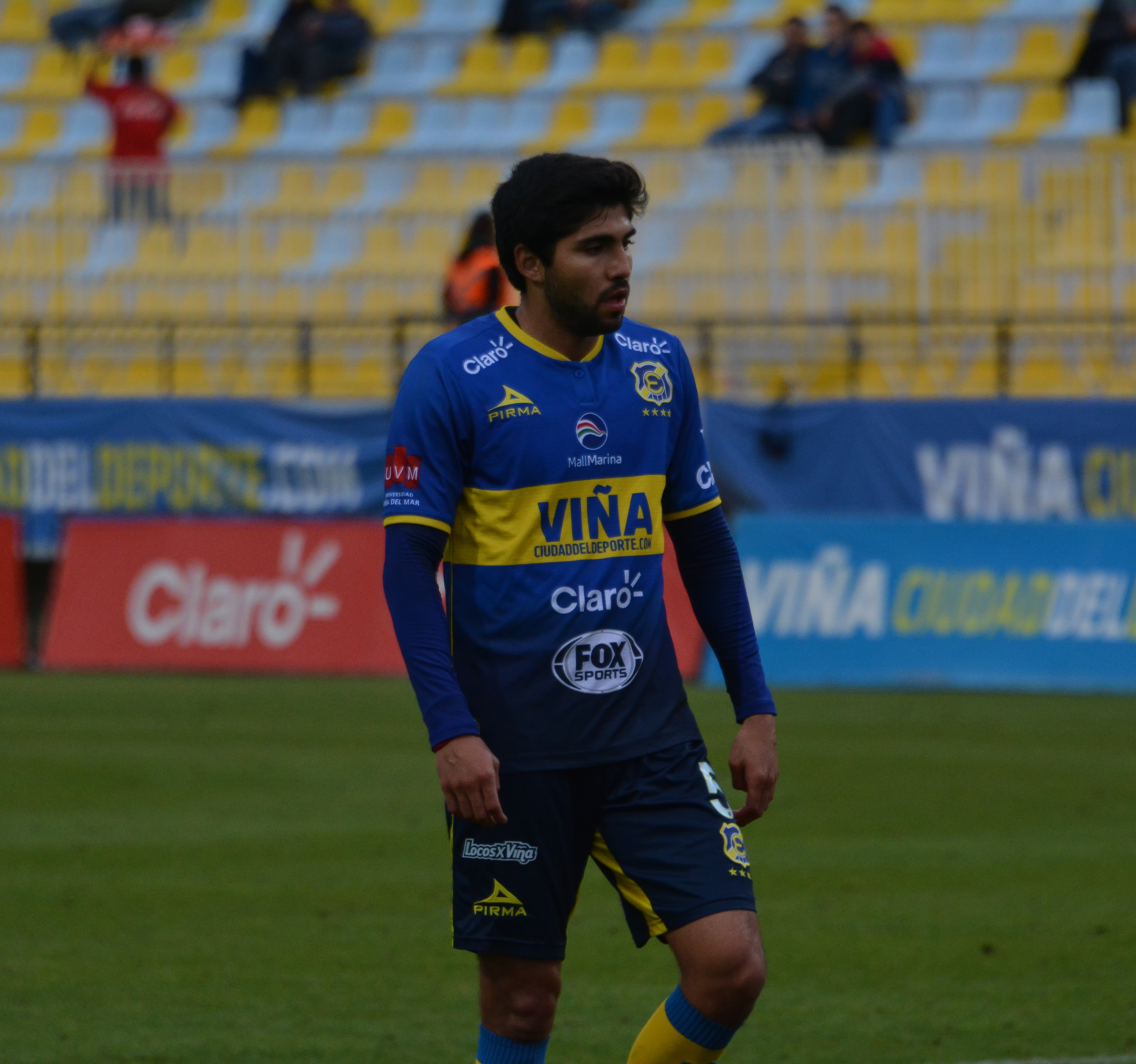
- Ochoa with Everton in 2018

Personal information
- Full name: Iván Fernando Ochoa Chávez
- Date of birth: 13 August 1996 (age 30)
- Place of birth: Tampico, Tamaulipas, Mexico
- Height: 1.81 m (5 ft 11 in)
- Position: Midfielder

Team information
- Current team: Jaiba Brava
- Number: 5

Youth career
- 2011–2015: Pachuca

Senior career*
Years	Team	Apps	(Gls)
2015–2018	Pachuca	2	(0)
2015	→ Zacatecas (loan)	0	(0)
2016–2018	→ Everton (loan)	58	(4)
2019–2021	León	10	(1)
2021	→ Audax Italiano (loan)	29	(1)
2022	Juárez	8	(0)
2023	Atlante	10	(0)
2023	Orgullo Reynosa	0	(0)
2024	Real Estelí	22	(1)
2025–2026	Cancún	44	(0)
2026–	Jaiba Brava	5	(0)

International career
2013	Mexico U17	7	(4)
Medal record
Men's football
Representing Mexico
FIFA U-17 World Cup
Runner-up	2013 United Arab Emirates	Team
CONCACAF U-17 Championship
Winner	2013 Panama	Team
- * Club domestic league appearances and goals as of 16 September 2026

Iván Fernando Ochoa Chávez (born 13 August 1996) is a Mexican professional footballer who plays as a midfielder for Liga de Expansión MX club Jaiba Brava.

== Honours ==
Pachuca

- Liga MX: Clausura 2016
- CONCACAF Champions League: 2016–17

León

- Liga MX: Guardianes 2020

Mexico U17

- CONCACAF U-17 Championship: 2013
- FIFA U-17 World Cup runner-up: 2013

Individual

- FIFA U-17 World Cup Bronze Ball: 2013
