= Pedro Terán =

Mexican footballer (born 1996)

Personal information
- Full name: Pedro Antonio Terán Mendoza
- Date of birth: 20 July 1996 (age 30)
- Place of birth: Saltillo, Mexico
- Height: 1.81 m (5 ft 11 1/2 in)
- Positions: Defensive midfielder; defender

Youth career
- 2011–2017: Atlas

Senior career*
| Years | Team | Apps | (Gls) |
| 2013–2016 | Atlas | 0 | (0) |
| 2015–2017 | → Venados (loan) | 33 | (0) |
| 2018–2019 | Real Zamora | 15 | (2) |
| 2019 | La Piedad | 11 | (1) |
| 2020 | CAFESSA Jalisco | 6 | (0) |
| 2020 | Matamoros | 5 | (0) |
| 2021 | Cuautla | 10 | (1) |
| 2021–2023 | Tecos | 55 | (7) |

International career^{‡}
| 2013 | Mexico U17 | 12 | (0) |
Medal record
Men's football
Representing Mexico
FIFA U-17 World Cup
| Runner-up | 2013 United Arab Emirates | Team |
CONCACAF U-17 Championship
| Winner | 2013 Panama | Team |
- * Club domestic league appearances and goals as of 25 January 2020 ‡ National team caps and goals as of

Pedro Antonio Terán Mendoza (born July 24, 1996) is a Mexican footballer who currently plays for Tecos.

== Career ==
Born in Saltillo, Terán began playing youth football with Necaxa Saltillo. He joined Club Atlas, where he would be loaned to Venados F.C. twice. He made his professional debut with Venados in the Ascenso MX.

Terán played an important part in Mexico's participation at the 2013 FIFA U-17 World Cup. In December 2015 Terán joined Mérida club Venados F.C. on a six-month loan, a contract which was then extended.

== Honours ==
=== International ===
Mexico U17

- CONCACAF U-17 Championship: 2013
- FIFA U-17 World Cup runner-up: 2013
