= Alejandro Díaz (footballer) =

Mexican footballer (born 1996)

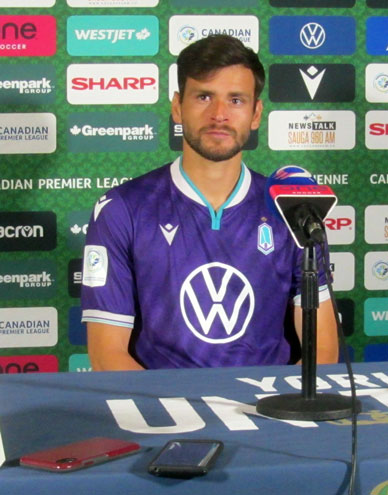
- Díaz in 2022

Personal information
- Full name: Alejandro Díaz Liceága
- Date of birth: 27 January 1996 (age 30)
- Place of birth: Mexico City, Mexico
- Height: 1.77 m (5 ft 10 in)
- Position: Forward

Team information
- Current team: Pacific
- Number: 99

Youth career
- 2005–2014: América

Senior career*
| Years | Team | Apps | (Gls) |
| 2014–2020 | América | 22 | (1) |
| 2016–2017 | → Necaxa (loan) | 12 | (0) |
| 2018–2019 | → Atlas (loan) | 11 | (0) |
| 2019 | → Zacatepec (loan) | 3 | (0) |
| 2020–2022 | Pacific | 55 | (26) |
| 2022–2025 | Sogndal | 18 | (6) |
| 2023–2025 | → Vancouver FC (loan) | 52 | (13) |
| 2025 | Vancouver FC | 0 | (0) |
| 2025 | → Pacific (loan) | 13 | (6) |
| 2026– | Pacific | 25 | (5) |

International career^{‡}
| 2013 | Mexico U17 | 12 | (3) |
| 2015 | Mexico U20 | 7 | (4) |
| 2016 | Mexico U23 | 3 | (0) |
Medal record
Men's football
Representing Mexico
FIFA U-17 World Cup
| Runner-up | 2013 United Arab Emirates | Team |
CONCACAF U-17 Championship
| Winner | 2013 Panama | Team |
- * Club domestic league appearances and goals as of October 27, 2026 ‡ National team caps and goals as of 6 February 2020

Alejandro Díaz Liceága (born 27 January 1996), also known as Wero Díaz, is a Mexican professional footballer who plays as a forward for Canadian Premier League club Pacific FC.

== Club career ==
=== Mexico ===
Díaz was a fan of rivals Guadalajara. He played for an academy of Real Madrid based in Mexico and later moved to Club America's academy. A product of América's academy programme, Díaz made his debut for the club in Liga MX on 22 November 2014 as an 84th-minute substitute in a 2–1 loss to Atlas. On 8 April 2015, he scored his first goal for the club in CONCACAF Champions League in a 6–0 win over Costa Rican side Herediano. That season, he made a total of three league appearances, one appearance in the Copa MX and two appearances in Champions League. The following season, he made one league appearance and one appearance in Champions League.

On 8 June 2016, Díaz was loaned to Necaxa until the end of the season. He made twelve league appearances that season, one in the Liguilla Apertura and five in the Copa MX. His only goal for Necaxa came in a 5–1 Copa MX victory over Potros UAEM.

Diaz returned to America for the 2017–2018 campaign, where he was finally promoted to América's first team on a regular basis. He made eighteen league appearances that season, four in the Liguilla Apertura, five in the Copa MX and two in Champions League, scoring a goal in the league and another in Champions League against Panamanian side Tauro.

In the 2018–19 season, Díaz was loaned to Atlas, where he made eleven league appearances and two Copa MX appearances, but failed to score.

On 5 August 2019, Díaz was loaned to Ascenso MX side Zacatepec. That season, he made three league appearances, three appearances in the Liguilla Apertura and three appearances in the Copa MX, but again failed to score.

=== Canada and Norway ===
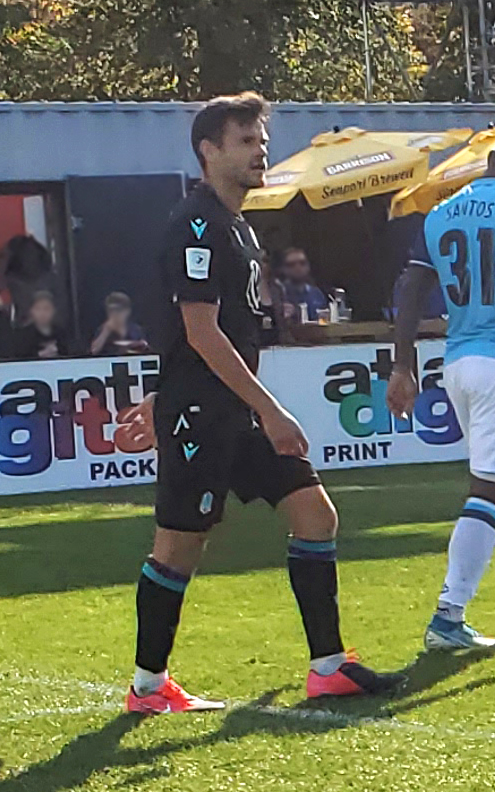
Díaz with Pacific in 2021

On 6 February 2020, Díaz signed with Canadian Premier League club Pacific. He made his debut on August 15 against the HFX Wanderers. He scored his first goal for the club on August 25, in a 2–0 victory over Valour FC. On July 21, 2021, Díaz scored his first hat-trick with Pacific in a 4–2 win over Atlético Ottawa. That season, he scored 10 goals and helped lead the club to their first ever league championship. After the title-winning 2021 season, it was rumoured that Díaz would depart the club, but he returned for 2022. His 2022 with Pacific was very successful, as he scored 13 goals in 18 league matches, factoring into the golden boot race. As league champions, Pacific also got to participate in the 2022 Concacaf League, and in the second leg their first ever continental matchup Díaz scored a hat trick against Waterhouse, helping to ensure Pacific advanced. When Díaz departed the club midseason, he was the leading scorer in the league, with 13.

On 10 August 2022, Díaz signed with Norwegian First Division side Sogndal for a club-record fee, the second-largest transfer fee in Canadian Premier League history. On 11 July 2023, he joined Vancouver FC in the Canadian Premier League on a one-year loan. His loan was subsequently extended for another year until June 2025.

In July 2025, he signed with Vancouver, before immediately being loaned to Pacific for the remainder of 2025, with an option for a permanent transfer. On August 10, 2025, he became the Canadian Premier League's all-time leading scorer, after scoring his 41st league goal, in a 3–2 victory over Vancouver FC. After the 2025 season, he signed with Pacific FC on a permanent contract through 2027.

== International career ==
In 2013, Díaz played for the under-17 squad at the 2013 CONCACAF U-17 Championship, making five appearances and scoring one goal against Cuba as Mexico went on to win the tournament. At the 2013 FIFA U-17 World Cup he again featured heavily for Mexico, making seven appearances and scoring goals against Iraq and Italy on route to a finals run in which Mexico lost 3–0 to Nigeria.

In 2015, Díaz represented the under-20 side at the 2015 CONCACAF U-20 Championship, making five appearances as Mexico went on to win the tournament. He scored four goals, the first two coming in a 9–1 victory over Cuba, the third in a 3–0 win over Honduras and the fourth in a 3–1 win over El Salvador. At the 2015 FIFA U-20 World Cup, Díaz made appearances against Mali and Serbia as Mexico were knocked out in the group stage.

In 2016, Díaz represented the under-23 team at the 2016 Toulon Tournament, making three appearances.

== Career statistics ==
As of 24 October 2025

Club statistics
| Club | Season | League | | | Cup (Note: Includes Copa MX and Canadian Championship) | | Continental (Note: Includes CONCACAF Champions League and CONCACAF League) | | Other (Note: Includes Liga MX Liguilla, Ascenso MX Liguilla and Canadian Premier League playoffs) | | Total | |
| Club | Season | Division | Apps | Goals | Apps | Goals | Apps | Goals | Apps | Goals | Apps | Goals |
|---|---|---|---|---|---|---|---|---|---|---|---|---|
| América | 2014–15 | Liga MX | 3 | 0 | 1 | 0 | 2 | 1 | — | | 6 | 1 |
| América | 2015–16 | Liga MX | 1 | 0 | — | | 1 | 0 | — | | 2 | 0 |
| América | 2017–18 | Liga MX | 18 | 1 | 5 | 0 | 2 | 1 | 4 | 0 | 29 | 2 |
| América | 2018–19 | Liga MX | — | | 2 | 0 | — | | — | | 2 | 0 |
| América | Total | | 22 | 1 | 8 | 0 | 5 | 2 | 4 | 0 | 39 | 3 |
| Necaxa (loan) | 2016–17 | Liga MX | 12 | 0 | 5 | 1 | — | | 1 | 0 | 18 | 1 |
| Atlas (loan) | 2018–19 | Liga MX | 11 | 0 | 2 | 0 | — | | — | | 13 | 0 |
| Zacatepec (loan) | 2019–20 | Ascenso MX | 3 | 0 | 3 | 0 | — | | 3 | 0 | 9 | 0 |
| Pacific | 2020 | Canadian Premier League | 10 | 3 | — | | — | | — | | 10 | 3 |
| Pacific | 2021 | Canadian Premier League | 27 | 10 | 3 | 2 | — | | 1 | 0 | 31 | 12 |
| Pacific | 2022 | Canadian Premier League | 18 | 13 | 1 | 0 | 2 | 3 | — | | 21 | 16 |
| Pacific | Total | | 55 | 26 | 4 | 2 | 2 | 3 | 1 | 0 | 62 | 31 |
| Sogndal Fotball | 2022 | Norwegian First Division | 11 | 6 | — | | — | | — | | 11 | 6 |
| Sogndal Fotball | 2023 | Norwegian First Division | 6 | 0 | — | | — | | — | | 6 | 0 |
| Sogndal Fotball | Total | | 17 | 6 | 0 | 0 | 0 | 0 | 0 | 0 | 17 | 6 |
| Vancouver FC (loan) | 2023 | Canadian Premier League | 14 | 2 | 0 | 0 | — | | — | | 14 | 2 |
| Vancouver FC (loan) | 2024 | Canadian Premier League | 28 | 10 | 1 | 0 | — | | — | | 29 | 10 |
| Vancouver FC (loan) | 2025 | Canadian Premier League | 10 | 1 | 2 | 1 | — | | — | | 12 | 2 |
| Vancouver FC | 2025 | Canadian Premier League | 0 | 0 | 0 | 0 | — | | — | | 14 | 2 |
| Vancouver FC | Total | | 52 | 13 | 3 | 1 | 0 | 0 | 0 | 0 | 55 | 14 |
| Pacific (loan) | 2025 | Canadian Premier League | 13 | 6 | 0 | 0 | — | | — | | 13 | 6 |
| Career total | | | 185 | 52 | 25 | 4 | 7 | 5 | 9 | 0 | 250 | 61 |

== Honours ==
América

- Liga MX: Apertura 2014
- CONCACAF Champions League: 2014–15, 2015–16

Pacific

- Canadian Premier League: 2021

Mexico Youth

- CONCACAF U-17 Championship: 2013
- FIFA U-17 World Cup runner-up: 2013
- CONCACAF U-20 Championship: 2015

Individual

- CONCACAF U-20 Championship Best XI: 2015
- Canadian Premier League Golden Boot: 2022
