= Football Association of Cuba =

Governing body of association football in Cuba

CONCACAF
- Founded: 1924; 102 years ago
- Headquarters: Havana
- FIFA affiliation: 1929
- CONCACAF affiliation: 1961
- President: Oliet Rodríguez

The Asociación de Fútbol de Cuba is the official governing body of the sport of football in Cuba including the Cuba national football team, Cuba women's national football team and Cuba national futsal team.

== Association staff ==
Name	Position	Source
(Cuba) Oliet Rodríguez	President	
(Cuba) Ciro Escalona	Vice-president	
(Cuba) Luis Veita	2nd Vice-president	
(Cuba) Miguel Díaz	General secretary	
(Cuba) Andy Guzman	Treasurer	
(Cuba) José Herranz	Technical director	
(Cuba) Pedro Pereira	Coach (men's)	
(Cuba) Elizabeth Cuff	Coach (women's)	
(Cuba) Jesus Pereira	Media/Communications Manager	
(Cuba) Luis Veita	Futsal coordinator	
(Cuba) María Saez	Chairperson of the Referees Committee	
(Cuba) Lazaro Rojas	Head/Director of the Referees Department	
(Cuba) Antonio Álvarez	Referee coordinator	

== Notable former players ==
- Yénier Márquez most-capped player of the Cuba national team
- (Cuba) Eduardo Sebrango Vancouver Whitecaps, later Montreal Impact player
- (Cuba) Mario Inchausti (3 June 1915 – 2 May 2006) was a Cuban footballer who played in Spain for Real Zaragoza, Real Betis and Real Madrid, before retiring in 1942 due to injury
- Héctor Socorro scorer of three goals in the 1938 FIFA World Cup, helping Cuba reach the quarterfinals

== See also ==
- Football in Cuba
