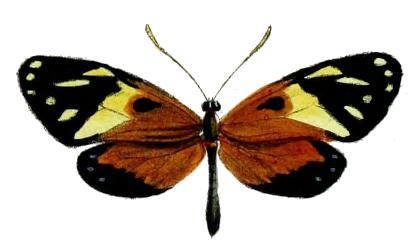
- Ithomia iphianassa panamensis
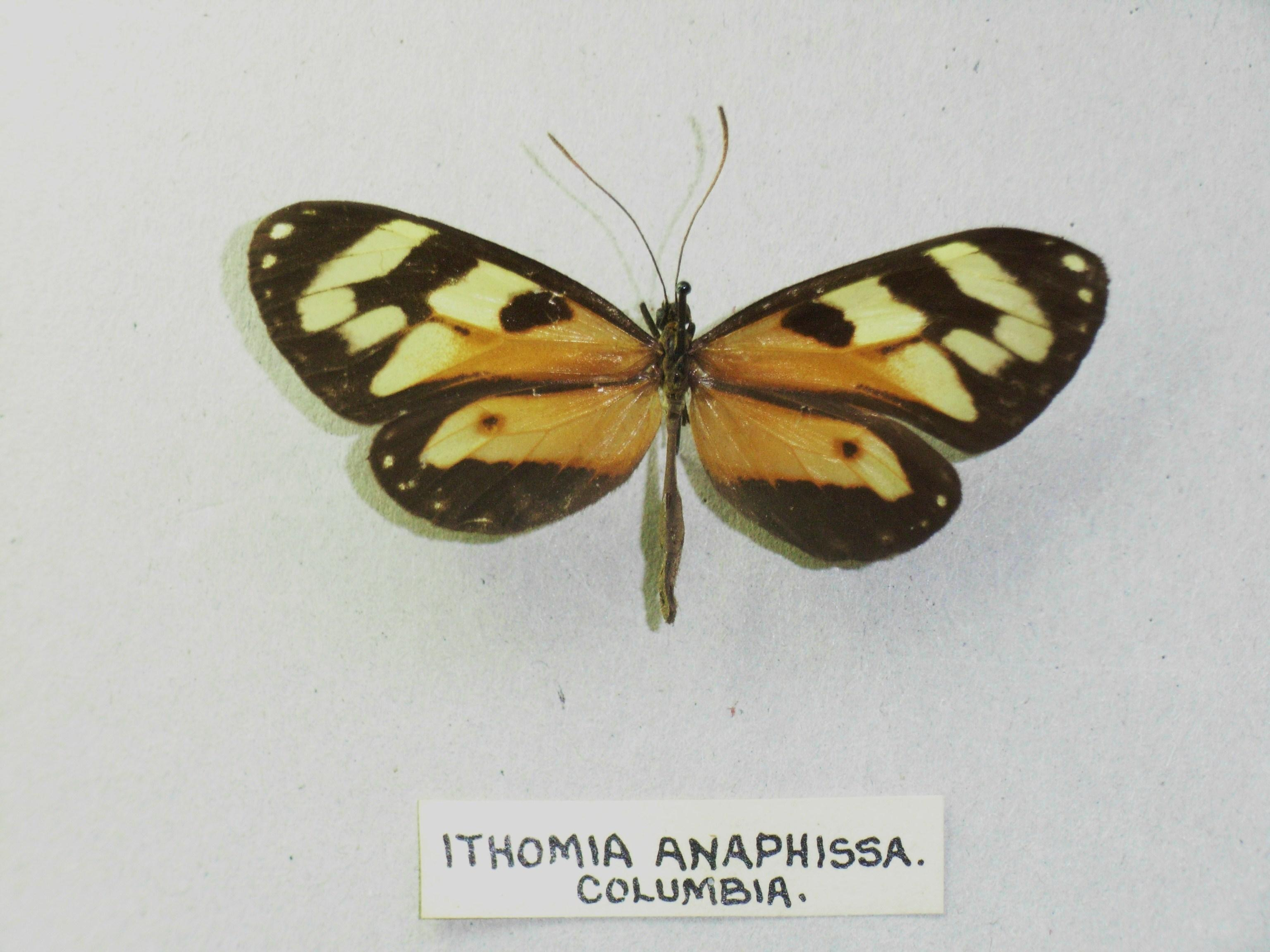
- Ithomia iphianassa anaphissa

Scientific classification
- Domain: Eukaryota
- Kingdom: Animalia
- Phylum: Arthropoda
- Class: Insecta
- Order: Lepidoptera
- Family: Nymphalidae
- Genus: Ithomia
- Species: I. iphianassa

Binomial name
- Ithomia iphianassa Doubleday, 1947

Synonyms
- Dynothea lycaste var. pumensis Reakirt, [1866]; Ithomia iphianassa var. panamensis Bates, 1863; Dynothea lycaste var. negrèta Reakirt, [1866]; Ceratinia boucardi Druce, 1875; Ithomia panamensis; Ithomia pepita Oberthür, 1879; Ithomia anaphissa

= Ithomia iphianassa =

Species of butterfly

Ithomia iphianassa is a species of butterfly of the family Nymphalidae. It is found in Central and northern South America.

feed on plants of the family Solanaceae, such as Cuatresia riparia, Cuatresia morii, and Acnistus arborescens.

== Subspecies ==
- Ithomia iphianassa iphianassa (Venezuela)
- Ithomia iphianassa panamensis Bates, 1863 (Panama)
- Ithomia iphianassa anaphissa Herrich-Schäffer, 1865 (Colombia)
- Ithomia iphianassa phanessa Herrich-Schäffer, 1865 (Ecuador, Colombia)
- Ithomia iphianassa alienassa Haensch, 1905 (Colombia)
- Ithomia iphianassa ethilla Neustetter, 1929 (western Colombia)

In addition, there is one unnamed subspecies from Ecuador.
