= Ulises Jaimes =

Mexican footballer (born 1996)

Personal information
- Full name: Ulises Ignacio Jaimes Huerta
- Date of birth: 20 April 1996 (age 30)
- Place of birth: Lázaro Cárdenas, Michoacán, Mexico
- Height: 1.73 m (5 ft 8 in)
- Position: Forward

Team information
- Current team: Atlético La Paz
- Number: 19

Youth career
- 2009–2016: Morelia

Senior career*
Years	Team	Apps	(Gls)
2016–2018	Monarcas Morelia	0	(0)
2017	→ Coras F.C. (loan)	15	(2)
2017	→ Zacatepec (loan)	3	(0)
2018	→ U. de C. (loan)	8	(0)
2019	Alacranes de Durango	13	(5)
2019–2020	Tepatitlán de Morelos	22	(10)
2020	Industriales Naucalpan F.C.	0	(0)
2021–2022	Mazorqueros	34	(14)
2022–	Atlético La Paz	32	(7)

International career
2013	Mexico U17	9	(4)
Medal record
Men's football
Representing Mexico
FIFA U-17 World Cup
Runner-up	2013 United Arab Emirates	Team
CONCACAF U-17 Championship
Winner	2013 Panama	Team
- * Club domestic league appearances and goals as of 8 May 2023

Ulises Ignacio Jaimes Huerta (Note: In this Spanish name, the first or paternal surname is Jaimes and the second or maternal family name is Huerta.) (born 20 April 1996) is a Mexican professional footballer who currently plays for Liga de Expansión MX club Atlético La Paz.

== Honours ==
=== International ===
Mexico U17

- CONCACAF U-17 Championship: 2013
- FIFA U-17 World Cup runner-up: 2013
