= Marco Granados =

Mexican footballer (born 1996)

Personal information
- Full name: Marco Antonio Granados Villegas
- Date of birth: 29 September 1996 (age 30)
- Place of birth: Manzanillo, Colima, Mexico
- Height: 1.83 m (6 ft 0 in)
- Position: Striker

Team information
- Current team: Panathinaikos Chicago

Youth career
- 2006–2015: Guadalajara

Senior career*
Years	Team	Apps	(Gls)
2015–2018	Guadalajara	2	(0)
2015	→ Venados (loan)	4	(0)
2016	→ Coras (loan)	14	(0)
2017	→ Tampico Madero (loan)	8	(0)
2017–2018	→ Loros UdeC (loan)	26	(11)
2018–2019	Tuxtla	14	(8)
2019	Aiginiakos	8	(1)
2019	Real Estelí	15	(1)
2020	Once Deportivo	7	(2)
2020–2021	Irapuato	23	(20)
2021–2022	UdeG	31	(9)
2022	Venados	2	(0)
2022	Santa Lucía	7	(0)
2023	Atlante	6	(1)
2023	Orgullo Reynosa	14	(3)
2024	A.D. Guanacasteca	10	(1)
2024–	Panathinaikos Chicago		

International career
2013	Mexico U17	10	(4)
Medal record
Men's football
Representing Mexico
FIFA U-17 World Cup
Runner-up	2013 United Arab Emirates	Team
CONCACAF U-17 Championship
Winner	2013 Panama	Team
- * Club domestic league appearances and goals

Marco Antonio Granados Villegas (Note: In this Spanish name, the first or paternal surname is Granados and the second or maternal family name is Villegas.) (born 29 September 1996) is a Mexican professional footballer who plays as a striker.

== Career ==
=== Youth career ===
Granados spent his whole youth career at C.D. Guadalajara's youth academy. He participated any various international youth tournaments with the club, and scored a total of 52 goals during three tournaments in Sweden, Denmark, and Norway.

==== Loan at Venados ====
In July 2015, it was announced Granados was sent out on loan to Ascenso MX club Venados in order to gain professional playing experience. He made his professional debut on 24 July 2015 against Zacatecas.

=== Guadalajara ===
Granados made his official Liga MX debut under coach Matias Almeyda as a substitute on 14 February 2016 against Club León.

==== Loan at Coras ====
On 6 June 2016, Guadalajara announced Granados was sent out on loan to Coras in order to gain playing time.

==== Loan at Tampico Madero ====
In December 2016, Guadalajara announced Granados was sent out on loan to Tampico Madero.

== International career ==
Granados won the CONCACAF U-17 Championship with Mexico in 2013. He was a part of the national team that made the final at the 2013 FIFA U-17 World Cup in the United Arab Emirates.

== Honours ==
Mexico U17

- CONCACAF U-17 Championship: 2013
- FIFA U-17 World Cup Runner-Up: 2013

Individual

- CONCACAF U-17 Championship Golden Boot: 2013
