= Goitia =

Goitia is a Basque surname which literally means "the upper part". Notable people with the surname include:

- Francisco Goitia (1882 – 1960), Mexican painter
- Iñaki Goitia (born 1982), Spanish football player
- Mario Inchausti Goitia (1915 – 2006), Cuban football player
