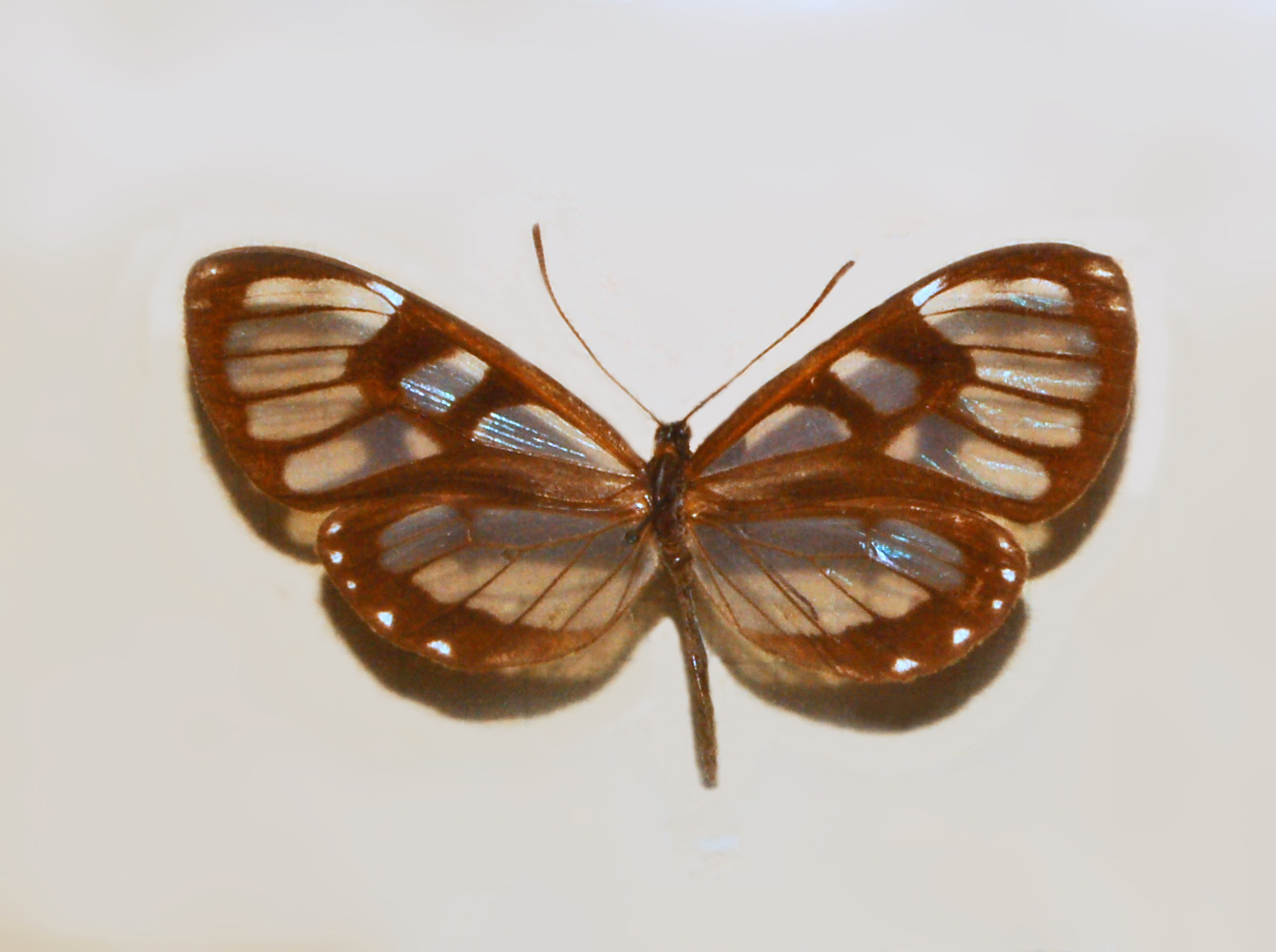
- Ithomia avella cesleria from Colombia. Mounted specimen

Scientific classification
- Kingdom: Animalia
- Phylum: Arthropoda
- Clade: Pancrustacea
- Class: Insecta
- Order: Lepidoptera
- Family: Nymphalidae
- Genus: Ithomia
- Species: I. avella

Binomial name
- Ithomia avella Hewitson, 1854

Synonyms
- Ithomia avella mira Staudinger, 1885 (preocc. Hewitson, 1877)

= Ithomia avella =

Species of butterfly

Ithomia avella is a Neotropical species of butterfly of the family Nymphalidae.

== Description ==
Ithomia avella has a wingspan of about 60–65 millimetres (2.4–2.6 in). Wings are transparent with black margins and black cross-bars on the forewings. The margins of the hindwings show a series of small white spots.

== Distribution ==
This species can be found in NW. Venezuela, Colombia and Ecuador.

== Subspecies ==
- Ithomia avella avella (Colombia)
- Ithomia avella cesleria Hewitson, 1855 (Colombia)
- Ithomia avella epona Hewitson, 1869 (Ecuador)
- Ithomia avella deliciae Fox, 1941 (Colombia)
- Ithomia avella katherineae Fox, 1971 (Colombia)
- Ithomia avella salazari Vitale & Bollino, 2000 (Ecuador)
- Ithomia avella miraculosa Lamas, 2003 (Colombia)
