= Salomón Wbias =

Mexican footballer (born 1996)

Personal information
- Full name: Salomón Wbias Nava
- Date of birth: March 9, 1996 (age 30)
- Place of birth: Mexico City, Mexico
- Height: 5 ft 8 in (1.73 m)
- Position: Defender

Youth career
- 2011–2017: Pachuca

Senior career*
Years	Team	Apps	(Gls)
2017–2018	Pachuca	0	(0)
2017	→ Orange County SC (loan)	15	(0)
2019	Cal FC	0	(0)

International career
2013	Mexico U17	2	(0)
2021–	Mexico (beach)	0	(0)
Medal record
Men's football
Representing Mexico
FIFA U-17 World Cup
Runner-up	2013 United Arab Emirates	Team
CONCACAF U-17 Championship
Winner	2013 Panama	Team
- * Club domestic league appearances and goals as of 20 October 2017

Salomón Wbias Nava (born March 9, 1996) is a former Mexican professional footballer who last played as a defender for Cal FC.

== Honours ==
Mexico U17

- CONCACAF U-17 Championship: 2013
- FIFA U-17 World Cup runner-up: 2013

== Club career ==
Wbias played with the Pachuca academy from 2011, before moving on loan to United Soccer League club Orange County SC on 2 February 2017.
