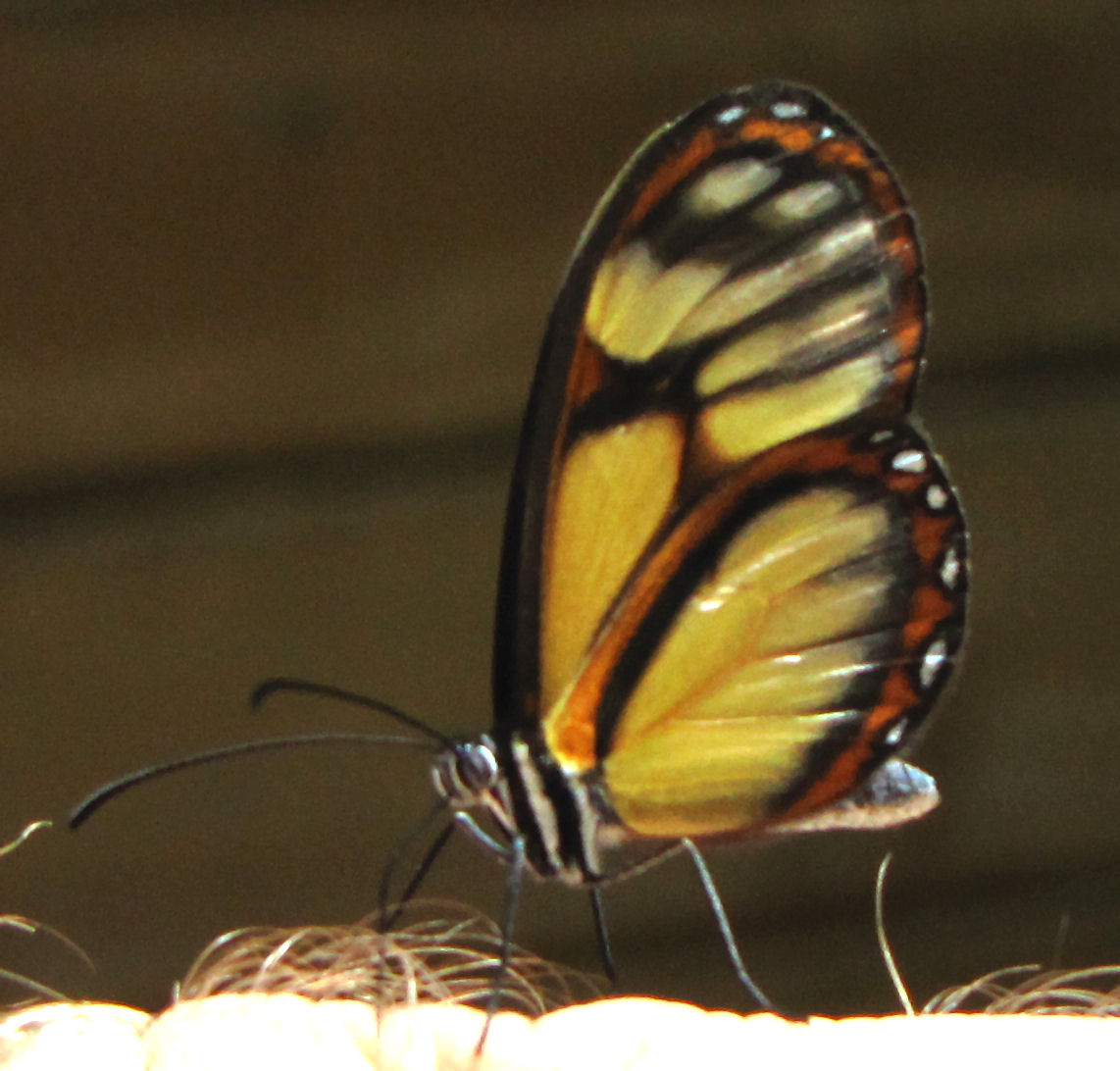
- Salapia glasswing (Ithomia salapia), Arvi Park, Colombia

Scientific classification
- Kingdom: Animalia
- Phylum: Arthropoda
- Class: Insecta
- Order: Lepidoptera
- Family: Nymphalidae
- Tribe: Ithomiini
- Genus: Ithomia; Hübner, 1816

Type species
- Ithomia drymo Hübner, 1816

Species
- See text

= Ithomia =

Genus of brush-footed butterflies

Ithomia is a genus of clearwing (ithomiine) butterflies, named by Jacob Hübner in 1816. They are in the brush-footed butterfly family, Nymphalidae.

== Species ==
Arranged alphabetically:

- Ithomia agnosia (Hewitson, [1855]) – agnosia glasswing
- Ithomia amarilla (Haensch, 1903)
- Ithomia arduinna (d'Almeida, 1952) – d'Almeida's glasswing
- Ithomia avella (Hewitson, 1864)
- Ithomia celemia (Hewitson, [1854])
- Ithomia cleora (Hewitson, 1855)
- Ithomia derasa (Hewitson, 1855) – milky glasswing
- Ithomia diasia (Hewitson, 1854)
- Ithomia drymo (Hübner, 1816)
- Ithomia eleonora (Haensch, 1905)
- Ithomia ellara (Hewitson, 1874) – Ellara glasswing
- Ithomia heraldica (Bates, 1866)
- Ithomia hyala (Hewitson, [1856])
- Ithomia iphianassa (Doubleday, 1947)
- Ithomia jucunda (Godman & Salvin, 1878)
- Ithomia lagusa (Hewitson, [1856])
- Ithomia leila (Hewitson, 1852) – Leila's glasswing
- Ithomia lichyi (d'Almeida, 1939)
- Ithomia patilla (Hewitson, 1852) – Guatemalan glasswing
- Ithomia praeithomia (Vitale & Bollino, 2003)
- Ithomia salapia (Hewitson, [1853]) – Salapia glasswing
- Ithomia terra (Hewitson, [1853]) – beautiful glasswing
- Ithomia xenos (Bates, 1866)
