= Víctor Zúñiga =

Mexican footballer (born 1996)

Personal information
- Full name: Víctor Manuel Zúñiga Medina
- Date of birth: 21 March 1996 (age 30)
- Place of birth: Nezahualcóyotl, Mexico
- Height: 1.70 m (5 ft 7 in)
- Position: Winger

Youth career
- 2011–2015: Cruz Azul

Senior career*
Years	Team	Apps	(Gls)
2015–2021	Cruz Azul	23	(0)
2018–2019	→ Venados (loan)	19	(0)
2020–2021	→ Cruz Azul Hidalgo (loan)	26	(4)
2021–2022	Sporting Canamy	20	(2)
2022–2023	Deportiva Venados	16	(0)
2023	Yalmakán	14	(0)
2024	Saltillo	7	(1)

International career
2013	Mexico U17	3	(0)
Medal record
Men's football
Representing Mexico
FIFA U-17 World Cup
Runner-up	2013 United Arab Emirates	Team
CONCACAF U-17 Championship
Winner	2013 Panama	Team
- * Club domestic league appearances and goals as of 15 January 2024

Víctor Manuel Zúñiga Medina (Note: In this Spanish name, the first or paternal surname is Zúñiga and the second or maternal family name is Medina.) (born 21 March 1996) is a Mexican professional footballer who plays as a winger.

== Honours ==
Mexico U17

- CONCACAF U-17 Championship: 2013
- FIFA U-17 World Cup runner-up: 2013
