= Patrick Kemper =

Paraguayan politician (born 1981)

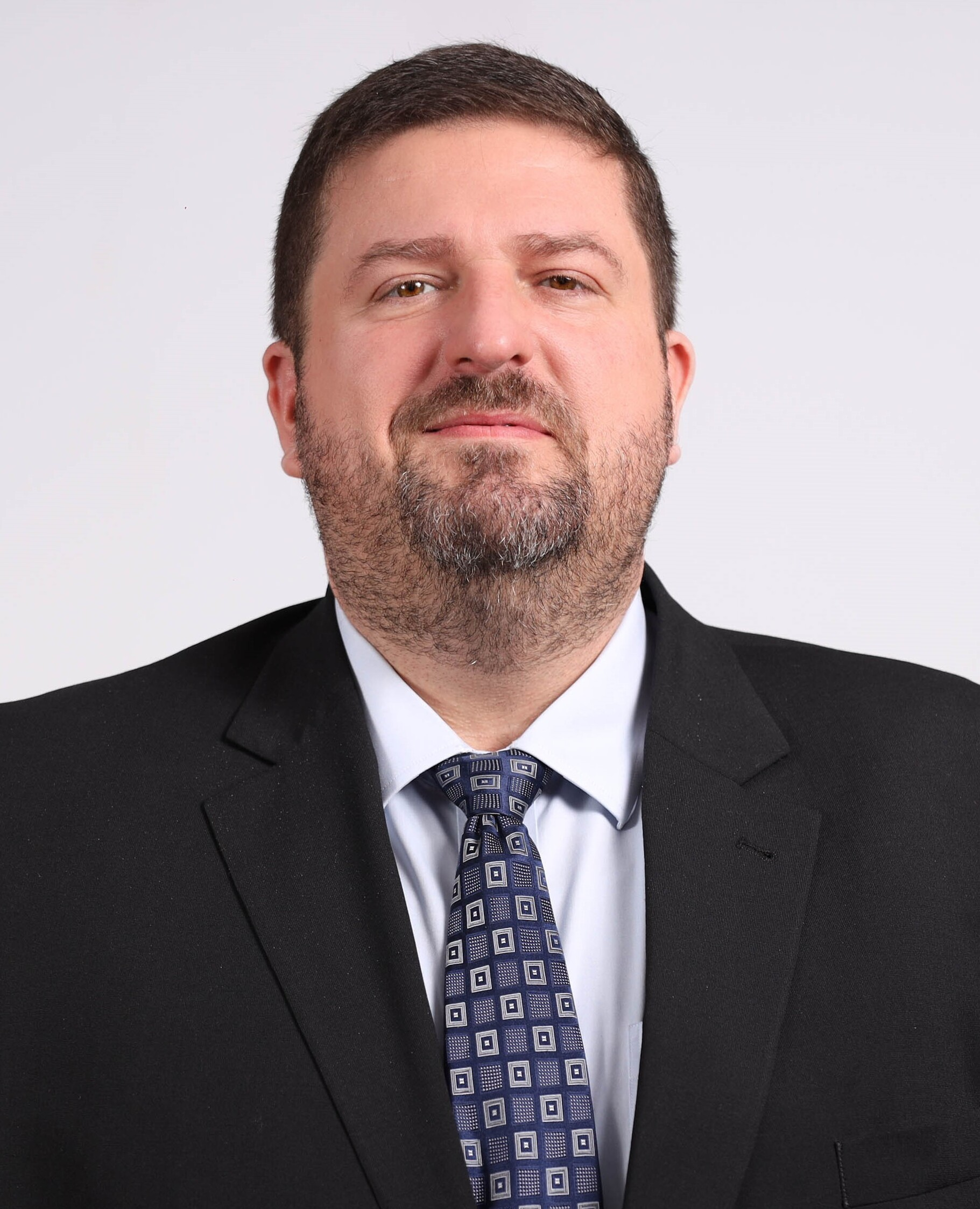
- Kemper in 2023

Senator of Paraguay
- Incumbent
- Assumed office 30 June 2018

President of Hagamos Political Party
- In office 2018–2024

Personal details
- Born: Patrick Paul Kemper Thiede; March 29, 1981 (age 45) Ciudad del Este, Alto Paraná Paraguay
- Party: Colorado (since 2024)
- Other political affiliations: Hagamos (2016-2024)
- Spouse: Sabrina Castorino (m. 2011)
- Children: 4
- Parents: Félix Kemper; Helga Thiede
- Occupation: Businessman; politician
- Website: patrickkemper.com.py

Patrick Paul Kemper Thiede (born 29 March 1981) is a Paraguayan businessman and politician who has served as senator since 2018. Since 2024, Kemper is a member of the Colorado Party, he previously represented the Hagamos Political Party, which he founded in 2016.

== Biography ==
=== Personal life ===
Patrick Paul Kemper Thiede was born in Ciudad del Este, Alto Paraná, on 29 March 1981, to Félix Kemper and Helga Thiede.

On 23 July 2011 he married María Sabrina Castorino Montanaro, with whom he has four children.

=== Education ===
In high school he was elected president of his class at the Goethe School, and later during his university studies he was first elected treasurer and a year later elected vice-president of the Student Government at the American University, culminating his studies at the aforementioned university, obtaining a degree in Business Administration and Management.

He also completed a master's degree in Financial Management at the University of Barcelona / EAE Business School, a master's degree in Strategic Governance and Political Communication at the George Washington University in Washington, DC He also completed the "Public Narrative: Leadership, Storytelling, and Action Program" in 2020, "Negotiation Strategies: Building Agreements Across Boundaries Program" in 2021 and "Senior Manager in Government" in 2022 at the John F. Kennedy School of Government at Harvard University, obtaining the "Executive Certificate in Public Leadership" awarded by the Harvard Kennedy School.

== Political career ==
He was appointed advisor to the Municipal Board of Asunción, Paraguay.

He is the founder of the Hagamos political party, and was its president, having been elected as candidate for senator of the nation at the age of 36 in the Primary elections of the mentioned party, assuming the position at the age of 37. He was elected in 2023 with the fewest votes of all elected candidates to the Senate (7,315), being able to join Congress due to the more than 100,000 votes that Senator Kattya González from the same party list attained. On 9 March 2024, Kemper joined the Colorado Party, abandoning the party in the process. This, along with the resignation of the party's sole representative in the Chamber of Deputies, Rubén Rubín, ten days later on March 19, resulted in the party losing all of its representation in Congress.
