= 2013 CONCACAF U-17 Championship =

Association football tournament for under-17 national teams

Tournament details
- Host country: Panama
- City: Panama City and Pedasi
- Dates: April 6–19, 2013 (13 days)
- Teams: 12 (from 1 confederation)
- Venue(s): 2 (in 2 host cities)

Final positions
- Champions: Mexico (5th title)
- Runners-up: Panama
- Third place: Canada
- Fourth place: Honduras

Tournament statistics
- Matches played: 20
- Goals scored: 67 (3.35 per match)
- Attendance: 17,087 (854 per match)
- Top scorer(s): (Mexico) Marco Granados (4 goals)

The 2013 CONCACAF U-17 Championship was a North American international association football tournament that determined the 2013 FIFA U-17 World Cup participants from the CONCACAF region. The 2013 edition of the competition was held in Panama.

== Qualified teams ==
Three teams will qualify through the Central American qualifying tournament and five will qualify through the Caribbean qualifying tournament. Hosts Panama automatically qualify.

Region	Qualification Tournament	Qualifiers
Caribbean (CFU)	Caribbean U-17 qualifying tournament	Jamaica; Cuba; Haiti; Trinidad and Tobago; Barbados
Central America (UNCAF)	Central American U-17 qualifying tournament	Panama (hosts); Honduras; Costa Rica; Guatemala
North America (NAFU)	Automatically qualified	Canada; Mexico; United States

== Venues ==
2013 CONCACAF U-17 Championship is located in Panama	Panama City	La Chorrera
2013 CONCACAF U-17 Championship is located in Panama	Estadio Rommel Fernández	Estadio Agustin Muquita Sánchez
2013 CONCACAF U-17 Championship is located in Panama	Capacity: 32,000	Capacity: 3,040

== Group stage ==
Tiebreakers
a. Greater number of Points in matches between the tied teams.
b. Greater Goal Difference in matches between the tied teams (if more than two teams finish equal on points).
c. Greater number of goals scored in matches among the tied teams (if more than two teams finish equal on points).
d. Greater Goal difference in all group matches.
e. Greater number of goals scored in all group matches.
f. Drawing of lots.

All times are local time

=== Group A ===
Team	Pld	W	D	L	GF	GA	GD	Pts
Panama	2	1	1	0	3	1	+2	4
Jamaica	2	0	2	0	3	3	0	2
Barbados	2	0	1	1	2	4	−2	1

6 April 2013
20:00

Panama	1–1	Jamaica
Molina 90'	Report	Flemmings 40'

Estadio Agustín Sánchez, Panamá Province
Attendance: 2,100
Referee: Jesús Morales (Mexico)

8 April 2013
17:30

Barbados	2–2	Jamaica
Boyce 18'; Belle 55'	Report	Bryan 7'; Flemmings 38' (pen.)

Estadio Agustín Sánchez, Panamá Province
Attendance: 94
Referee: David Rubalcaba (Cuba)

10 April 2013
20:00

Panama	2–0	Barbados
Zorrilla 24', 79'	Report

Estadio Agustín Sánchez, Panamá Province
Attendance: 2,000
Referee: Juan Guzman (United States)

=== Group B ===
Team	Pld	W	D	L	GF	GA	GD	Pts
Canada	2	1	1	0	3	1	+2	4
Trinidad and Tobago	2	1	0	1	2	2	0	3
Costa Rica	2	0	1	1	1	3	−2	1

6 April 2013
17:30

Trinidad and Tobago	0–2	Canada
	Report	Dominguez 41'; Hamilton 59'

Estadio Agustín Sánchez, Panamá Province
Attendance: 511
Referee: Juan Guzman (United States)

8 April 2013
20:00

Costa Rica	0–2	Trinidad and Tobago
	Report	Fortune 33'; Sam 79'

Estadio Agustín Sánchez, Panamá Province
Attendance: 195
Referee: Armando Castro (Honduras)

10 April 2013
17:30

Canada	1–1	Costa Rica
Boakai 76'	Report	Alexander 59'

Estadio Agustín Sánchez, Panamá Province
Attendance: 110
Referee: Jonathan Polanco (Guatemala)

=== Group C ===
Team	Pld	W	D	L	GF	GA	GD	Pts
United States	2	2	0	0	4	0	+4	6
Guatemala	2	1	0	1	3	2	+1	3
Haiti	2	0	0	2	1	6	−5	0

7 April 2013
17:30

Haiti	0–3	United States
	Report	Lema 26', 73'; Selemani 86'

Estadio Rommel Fernández, Panama City
Attendance: 143
Referee: Christophel Stewart (Cayman Islands)

9 April 2013
17:30

Guatemala	3–1	Haiti
Ortiz 24', 28'; M. Hernández 78'	Report	Derival 12'

Estadio Rommel Fernández, Panama City
Attendance: 95
Referee: Kevin Morrison (Jamaica)

11 April 2013
17:30

United States	1–0	Guatemala
Baird 49'	Report

Estadio Rommel Fernández, Panama City
Attendance: 220
Referee: William Anderson (Puerto Rico)

=== Group D ===
Team	Pld	W	D	L	GF	GA	GD	Pts
Mexico	2	2	0	0	7	1	+6	6
Honduras	2	1	0	1	4	3	+1	3
Cuba	2	0	0	2	2	9	−7	0

7 April 2013
20:00

Cuba	1–5	Mexico
Samonte 29'	Report	Díaz 19'; L. Hernández 23', 36'; Granados 71', 86'

Estadio Rommel Fernández, Panama City
Attendance: 648
Referee: Henry Bejarano (Costa Rica)

9 April 2013
20:00

Honduras	4–1	Cuba
García 27', 34'; Velásquez 48'; R. Flores 87'	Report	Samonte 17'

Estadio Rommel Fernández, Panama City
Attendance: 240
Referee: William Anderson (Puerto Rico)

11 April 2013
20:00

Mexico	2–0	Honduras
Jaimes 30'; Terán 32'	Report

Estadio Rommel Fernández, Panama City
Attendance: 412
Referee: John Pitti (Panama)

== Knockout stage ==
Quarter-finals
13 April — Panamá Province
Panama	4
Trinidad and Tobago	2
13 April — Panamá Province
Canada	4
Jamaica	2
14 April — Panama City
United States	1
Honduras	3
14 April — Panama City
Mexico	2
Guatemala	0

Semi-finals
17 April — Panama City
Panama	2
Canada	1
17 April — Panama City
Honduras	1
Mexico	3

Final
19 April — Panama City
Panama	1
Mexico	2
Third place
19 April — Panama City
Canada (p)	2 (4)
Honduras	2 (2)

All times are local time

=== Quarter-finals ===
13 April 2013
17:00

Canada	4–2	Jamaica
Gordon 38', 75'; Boakai 60'; Hamilton 79'	Report	Stewart 5', 43'

Estadio Agustín Sánchez, Panamá Province
Attendance: 150
Referee: Juan Guzman (United States)
13 April 2013
20:00

Panama	4–2	Trinidad and Tobago
Araya 35'; Zuñiga 62'; Diaz 79', 88'	Report	Fortune 19'; Adams 86'

Estadio Agustín Sánchez, Panamá Province
Attendance: 2,100
Referee: Armando Castro (Honduras)
14 April 2013
17:00

United States	1–3	Honduras
Soñora 44'	Report	Alegría 42'; Elis 57'; Álvarez 68'

Estadio Rommel Fernández, Panama City
Attendance: 318
Referee: Henry Bejarano (Costa Rica)
14 April 2013
20:00

Mexico	2–0	Guatemala
Jaimes 9'; Granados 82'	Report

Estadio Rommel Fernández, Panama City
Attendance: 546
Referee: John Pitti (Panama)

=== Semi-finals ===
17 April 2013
17:00

Mexico	3–1	Honduras
Granados 43'; Wbias 44'; Zúñiga 85'	Report	Alegría 90+2'

Estadio Rommel Fernández, Panama City
Attendance: 352
Referee: Juan Guzman (United States)
17 April 2013
20:00

Panama	2–1	Canada
Diaz 37'; Zorrilla 81'	Report	Bustos 4'

Estadio Rommel Fernández, Panama City
Attendance: 6,853
Referee: Armando Castro (Honduras)

=== Third place match ===
19 April 2013
17:00

Canada	2–2 (a.e.t.)	Honduras
Hamilton 90+3'; Haynes 119'	Report	Bodden 16'; Ramos 107'
Penalties
Comsia (penalty missed); Mkungilwa (penalty scored); Haynes (penalty scored); Hamilton (penalty scored); Roubos (penalty scored)	4–2	(penalty missed) D. Flores; (penalty scored) R. Flores; (penalty missed) García; (penalty scored) Ramos

Estadio Rommel Fernández, Panama City
Attendance: 387
Referee: William Anderson (Puerto Rico)

=== Final ===
19 April 2013
20:00

Panama	1–2	Mexico
Araya 51'	Report	De Gracia 57' (o.g.); Wbias 69'

Estadio Rommel Fernández, Panama City
Attendance: 17,572
Referee: Henry Bejarano (Costa Rica)

== Winners ==
2013 CONCACAF U-17 Championship

Mexico
Fifth title

== Player awards ==
Golden Boot

- (Mexico) Marco Granados

Most Valuable Player of the Tournament

- (Mexico) José Francisco Almanza

Golden Glove

- (Mexico) Raúl Gudiño

Fair Play

- Mexico

== Countries to participate in 2013 FIFA U-17 World Cup ==
The 4 teams which qualified for the 2013 FIFA U-17 World Cup.

- Canada
- Honduras
- Mexico
- Panama

== Goalscorers ==
4 goals

- (Mexico) Marco Granados

3 goals

- (Canada) Jordan Hamilton
- (Panama) Jomar Diaz
- (Panama) Ervin Zorrilla

2 goals

- (Cuba) Yorjandy Samonte
- (Honduras) Christopher Alegría
- (Honduras) Devron García
- (Honduras) Jorge Bodden
- (Canada) Hanson Boakai
- (Canada) Andrew Gordon
- (Guatemala) Christopher Ortiz
- (Mexico) Luis Enrique Hernández
- (Mexico) Ulises Jaimes
- (Mexico) Salomón Wbias
- (Jamaica) Junior Flemmings
- (Jamaica) Khalil Stewart
- (Panama) Jesús Araya
- (Trinidad and Tobago) Andre Fortune
- (United States) Christopher Lema

1 goals

- (Barbados) Shakille Belle
- (Barbados) Shaquille Boyce
- (Canada) Marco Dominguez
- (Canada) Jordan Haynes
- (Canada) Marco Bustos
- (Costa Rica) Arington Alexander
- (Guatemala) Mario Hernández
- (Haiti) Jean Derival
- (Honduras) Kevin Álvarez
- (Honduras) Alberth Elis
- (Honduras) Rembrandt Flores
- (Honduras) Brayan Velásquez
- (Honduras) Steven Ramos
- (Jamaica) Raffique Bryan
- (Mexico) Alejandro Díaz
- (Mexico) Víctor Zúñiga
- (Mexico) Pedro Terán
- (Panama) Milciades Molina
- (Panama) Luis Zuñiga
- (Trinidad and Tobago) Weah Adams
- (Trinidad and Tobago) Brent Sam
- (United States) Corey Baird
- (United States) Ahinga Selemani
- (United States) Joel Soñora

Own goals

- (Panama) Jaime De Gracia (playing against Mexico)
