= Marco Domínguez =

Footballer

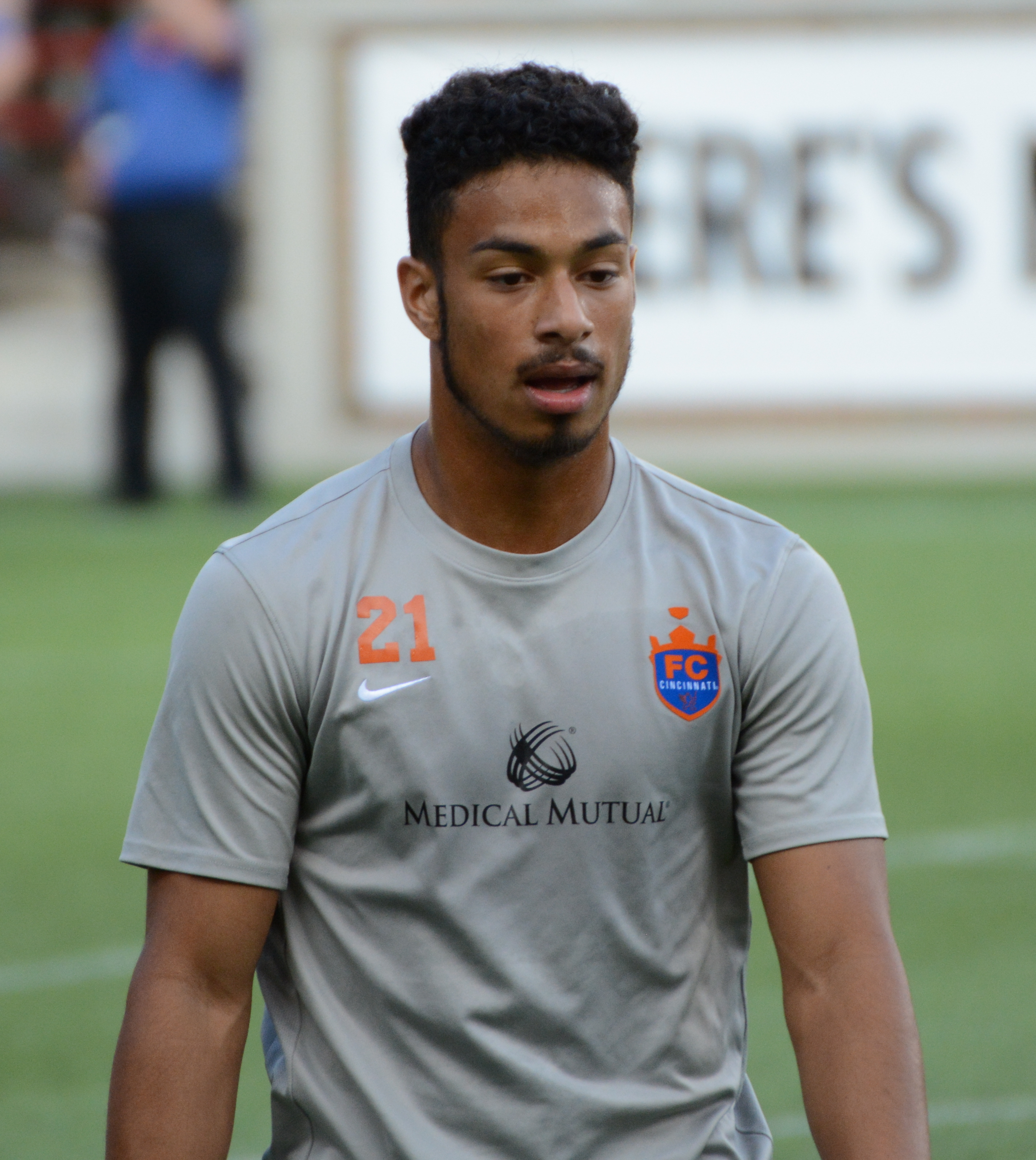
- Domínguez playing for FC Cincinnati in 2017

Personal information
- Full name: Marco Leonel Domínguez Ramírez
- Date of birth: 25 February 1996 (age 30)
- Place of birth: Montréal, Quebec, Canada
- Height: 1.78 m (5 ft 10 in)
- Position: Midfielder

Team information
- Current team: Comunicaciones
- Number: 5

Youth career
- 2008–2013: Braves d'Ahuntsic
- 2013–2015: Montreal Impact

Senior career*
Years	Team	Apps	(Gls)
2015–2016	FC Montreal	37	(1)
2017	FC Cincinnati	5	(0)
2018–2022	Antigua	135	(4)
2022	→ Al-Yarmouk (loan)	2	(1)
2023	Mixco	21	(2)
2023–2024	Municipal	31	(0)
2024	Pacific FC	10	(0)
2025–	Comunicaciones	3	(0)

International career^{‡}
2013	Canada U17	6	(1)
2016	Canada U20	1	(0)
2020–	Guatemala	21	(0)
- * Club domestic league appearances and goals as of 20:00, 27 January 2025 (UTC) ‡ National team caps and goals as of 20:00, 16 October 2024 (UTC)

Marco Leonel Domínguez Ramírez (born 25 February 1996) is a professional footballer who plays as a midfielder for Liga Guate club Comunicaciones. Born in Canada, he plays for the Guatemala national team.

== Early life ==
Domínguez was born in Montréal, Canada. He began his youth career with Braves d'Ahuntsic where he played for six years. He also spent time with the Soccer Québec High Performance Program. In 2013, he joined the Montreal Impact Academy. In October 2024, he was awarded a scholarship by the Impact academy. In January 2016, he had a training stint with the youth academy of Italian club Bologna.

== Club career ==
=== FC Montreal ===
In March 2015, Domínguez signed a professional contract with FC Montreal, the second team of the Montreal Impact, in the USL. He made his professional debut on 14 May against the Charleston Battery 1–0. In 2016, he went attended pre-season with the first team.

=== FC Cincinnati ===
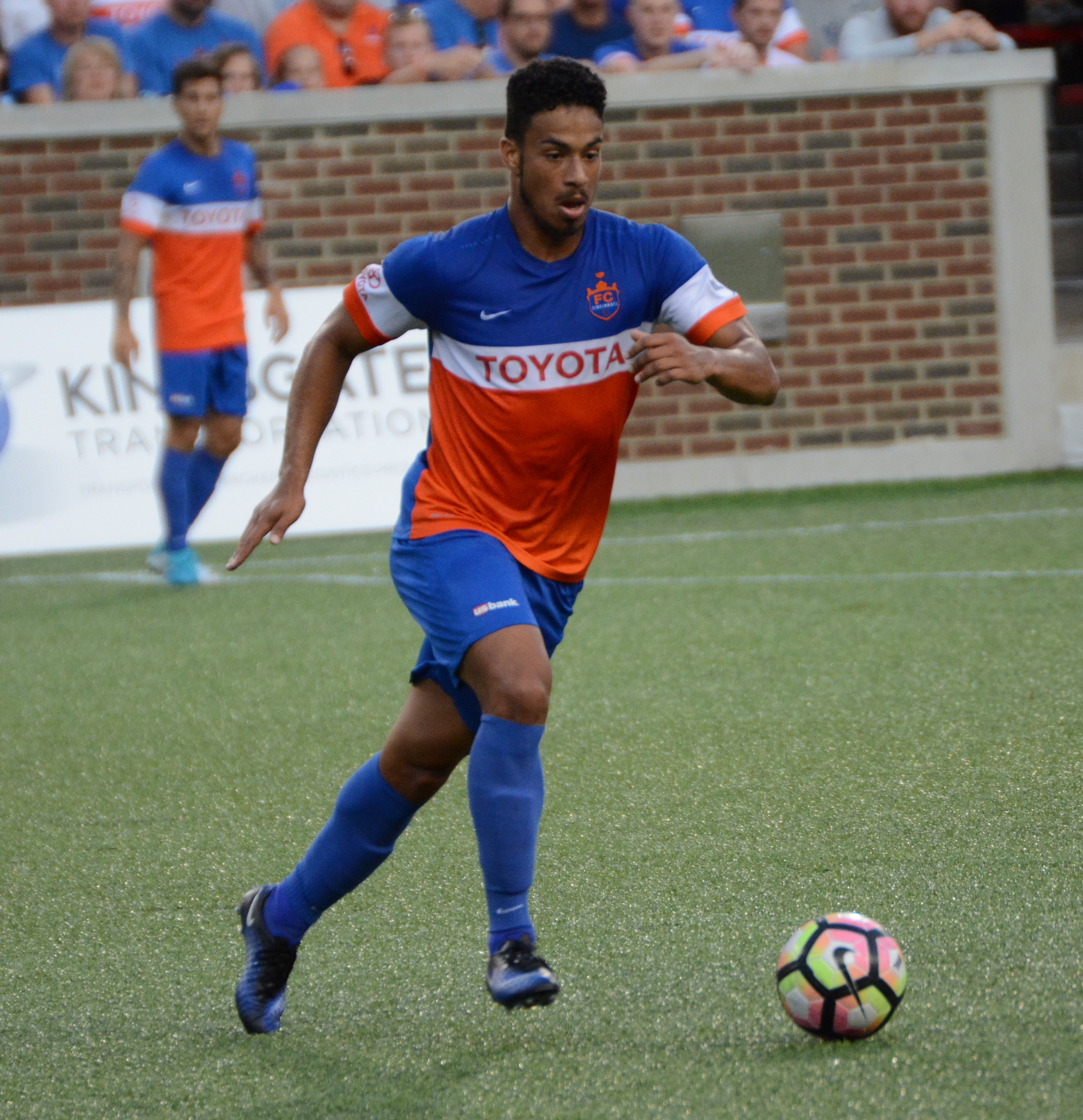
Marco Dominguez with FC Cincinnati in 2017

In January 2017, he signed with FC Cincinnati of the USL. At the end of the season, FC Cincinnati declined his option for 2018 season.

=== Antigua ===
In May 2018, Domínguez signed with Liga Nacional de Fútbol de Guatemala side Antigua GFC. He won the 2019 Clausera with the club.

==== Loan to Al-Yarmouk ====
In January 2022, he joined Al-Yarmouk in the Kuwaiti Premier League on loan.

==== Return to Antigua ====
In May 2022, he ended his loan and returned to Antigua.

=== Mixco ===
In January 2023, he moved to fellow first division club Mixco.

=== Municipal ===
In May 2023, he signed with Municipal in the Liga Nacional de Fútbol de Guatemala. In June 2024, he departed the club.

=== Pacific FC ===
In June 2024, he signed with Pacific FC of the Canadian Premier League. He made his debut on July 14 against Forge FC. At the end of the 2024 season, he agreed to a mutual termination of the remainder of his contract.

=== Comunicaciones ===
In December 2024, he signed with Liga Nacional de Fútbol de Guatemala club Comunicaciones for the 2025 season.

== International career ==
Born in Canada, Domínguez is the son of a Dominican mother and a Guatemalan father.

In 2013, he was named to the Canada U17 side that competed at the 2013 CONCACAF U-17 Championship as well as the 2013 FIFA U-17 World Cup. On 6 April 2013, he scored against Trinidad and Tobago U17 at the CONCACAF U17. In March 2016, he was called up to the Canadian U20 team.

In January 2020, his FIFA one-time switch was approved to be able to represent Guatemala at international level.

== Personal life ==
Domínguez has one child and chose to join Pacific FC in Canada, from playing in Guatemala, to "offer a different living environment, calmer, more serene and safer for his small family."

== Honours ==
Antigua

- Liga Nacional de Guatemala: Clausura 2019

Municipal

- Liga Nacional de Guatemala: Clausura 2024
