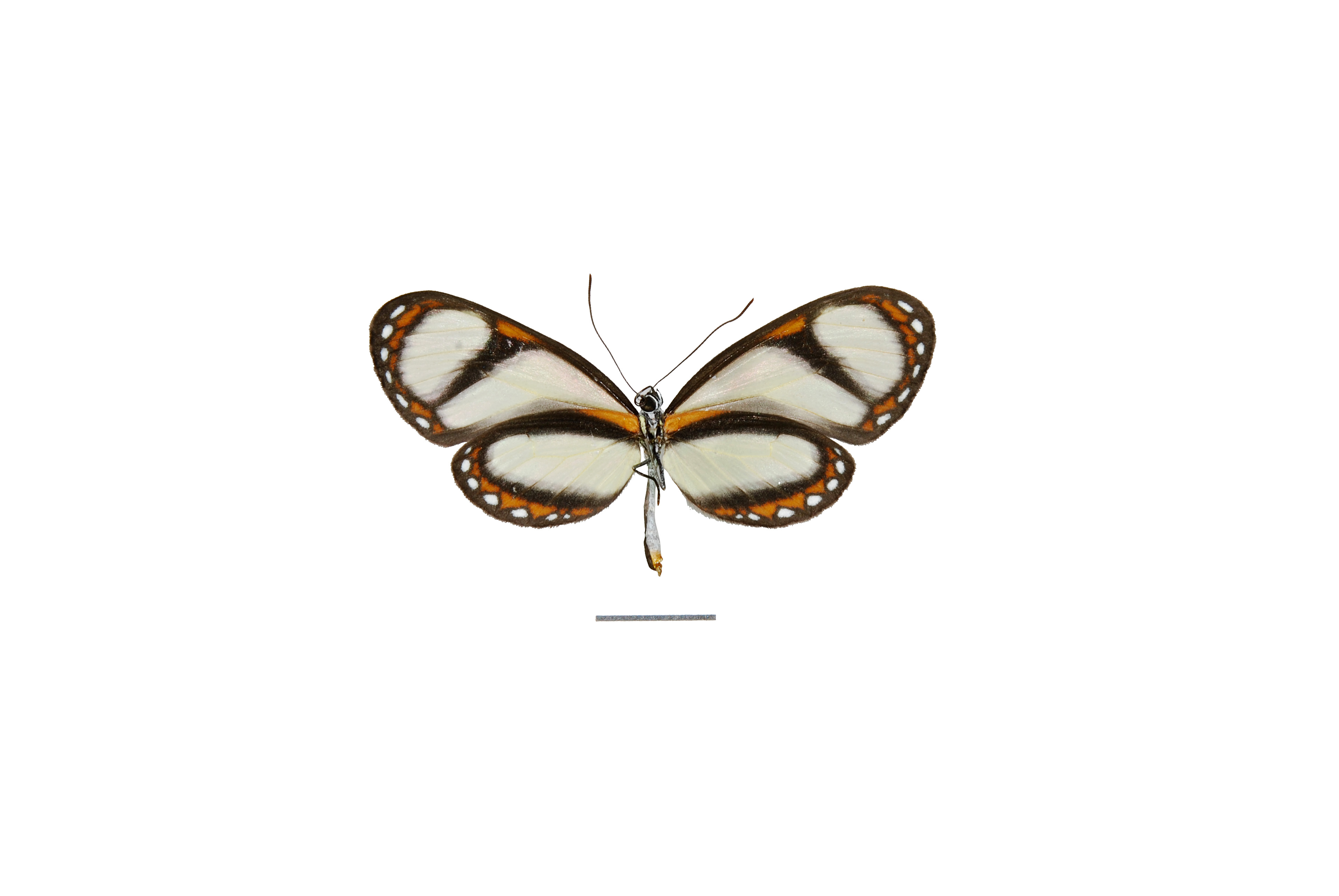

Scientific classification
- Domain: Eukaryota
- Kingdom: Animalia
- Phylum: Arthropoda
- Class: Insecta
- Order: Lepidoptera
- Family: Nymphalidae
- Genus: Ithomia
- Species: I. amarilla

Binomial name
- Ithomia amarilla Haensch, 1903

= Ithomia amarilla =

Species of butterfly

Ithomia amarilla is an ithomiine butterfly from the subfamily Danainae, described by Richard Haensch in 1903. It is found in Ecuador.

== Gallery ==
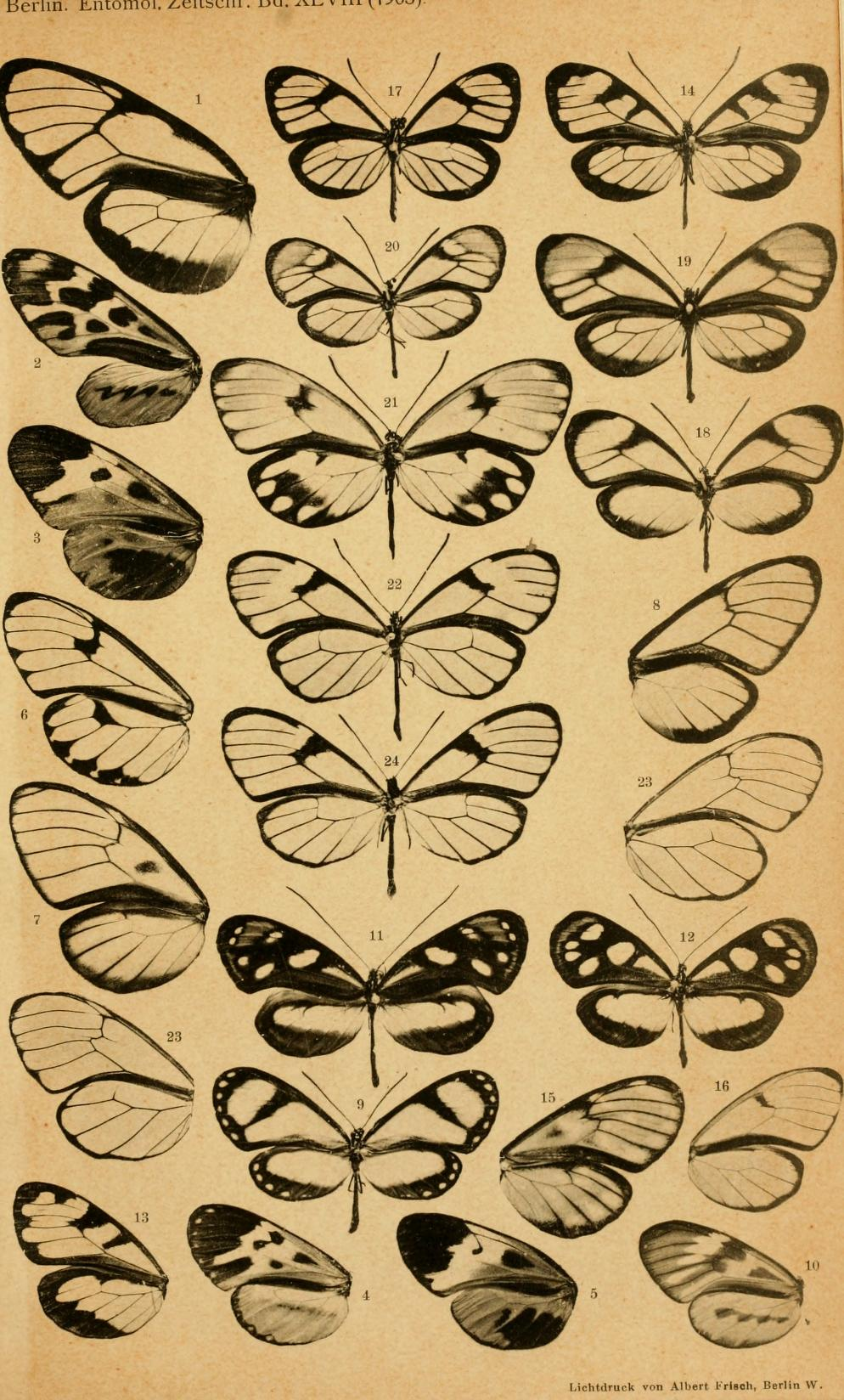
