= Maurice Ford =

Trinidad and Tobago footballer

Personal information
- Date of birth: 6 September 1996 (age 30)
- Position: Defender

Team information
- Current team: W Connection

Senior career*
Years	Team	Apps	(Gls)
2015–	W Connection		

International career^{‡}
2016–	Trinidad and Tobago	3	(0)
- * Club domestic league appearances and goals as of 09:19, 27 March 2018 (UTC) ‡ National team caps and goals as of 09:19, 27 March 2018 (UTC)

Maurice Ford (born 6 September 1996) is a Trinidadian international footballer who plays for W Connection, as a defender.

== Career ==
He has played club football for W Connection.

He made his international debut for Trinidad and Tobago in 2016.
