= Barba amarilla =

Barba amarilla (Spanish for "yellow beard") may refer to:

- Bothrops asper, or the terciopelo, a venomous pitviper species found in Central and northern South America
- Bothrops atrox, or the common lancehead, a venomous pitviper species found in tropical lowlands of northern South America east of the Andes
