= Jordan Haynes =

Canadian soccer player (born 1996)

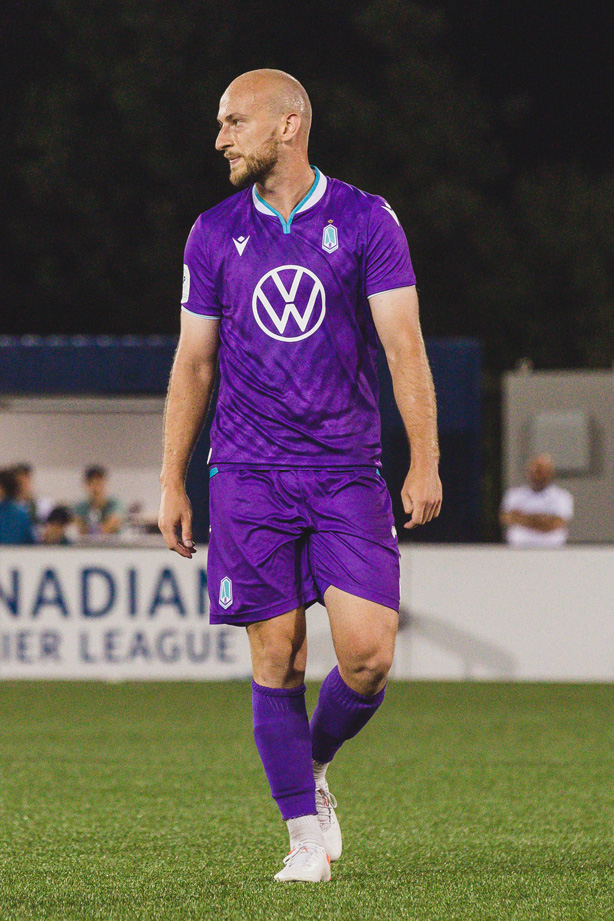
- Haynes with Pacific FC in 2022

Personal information
- Full name: Jordan Markus Haynes
- Date of birth: January 17, 1996 (age 30)
- Place of birth: Peterborough, Ontario, Canada
- Height: 1.78 m (5 ft 10 in)
- Positions: Full-back; midfielder

Youth career
- 2001–2004: Maple Leaf Cavan FC
- 2005–2006: Peterborough City SA
- 2007–2008: Whitby SC
- 2009–2010: Ajax SC
- 2011: Toronto FC
- 2011–2015: Vancouver Whitecaps FC

College career
Years	Team	Apps	(Gls)
2019	UBC Thunderbirds	21	(2)

Senior career*
Years	Team	Apps	(Gls)
2014	Vancouver Whitecaps U23	8	(0)
2014	→ Vancouver Whitecaps FC (loan)	0	(0)
2015–2016	Whitecaps FC 2	30	(1)
2017	OKC Energy U23	13	(0)
2017	Vaughan Azzurri	6	(0)
2018	Calgary Foothills FC	12	(0)
2019	TSS FC Rovers	14	(0)
2020–2022	Pacific FC	48	(0)
2023–2024	Valour FC	23	(0)

International career^{‡}
2013	Canada U17	8	(1)
2015	Canada U20	3	(0)
- * Club domestic league appearances and goals as of October 1, 2024 ‡ National team caps and goals as of April 2, 2015

Jordan Markus Haynes (born January 17, 1996) is a Canadian professional soccer player.

== Early life ==
Haynes began playing youth soccer at age five with Maple Leaf Cavan FC. At age nine, he joined Peterborough City SA, later joining Whitby SC in 2007 and Ajax SC in 2009. With Ajax, he won the U14 Ontario Cup and won a silver medal at the national championships at both the U14 and U15 levels. He also played with the Ontario provincial team at the U14, U15, and U16 levels. In 2011, he joined the Toronto FC Academy which competed in the second division of the Canadian Soccer League. He then went on trial with English club Queens Park Rangers's Academy, but was not able to join due to visa issues, as he was not eligible for an ancestral visa until he turned 17. He then returned to Canada, joining the Vancouver Whitecaps Academy in late 2011, where he spent the next five years.

== University career ==
In July 2019, Haynes committed to attend the University of British Columbia, where he would play for the men's soccer team beginning in the fall. He scored his first goal on October 25 against the Alberta Golden Bears, scoring an Olimpico (scoring directly from a corner kick). He played in all 21 of the team's matches that season, helping them to a sixth-placed finish at the U SPORTS National Championship. At the end of the season, he was named to the Canada West All-Second Team.

== Club career ==
In 2014, he played with the Vancouver Whitecaps U23 in the Premier Development League, making eight appearances. In June 2014, he was called up to the Vancouver Whitecaps FC first team ahead of a 2014 Canadian Championship match against Toronto FC, but was an unused substitute.

In February 2015, he signed a professional contract with Whitecaps FC 2 in the USL. He made his professional debut on April 1 in a 3–0 victory over the Austin Aztex. He scored his first professional goal in a 3-1 victory over Portland Timbers 2 on May 20, 2016.

In 2017, he played with the OKC Energy U23 in the Premier Development League. After the season, he joined Vaughan Azzurri in League1 Ontario.

In 2018, he returned to the PDL with Calgary Foothills FC, where he won the league championship with the club.

After the 2018 season, he received interest from some Canadian Premier League clubs, ahead of the league's inaugural season, but ultimately he was not offered a contract, and also had a trial with USL club FC Tucson, but did not make the squad. He then decided to attend UBC and play university soccer instead. In May 2019, he joined the TSS FC Rovers in the PDL.

In the spring of 2020, he went on trial with Canadian Premier League club Pacific FC. In July 2020, he signed a contract with the club. He was initially set to sign on a U SPORTS deal, but was instead offered a fully professional contract. In October 2020, Haynes re-signed with Pacific FC for the 2021 season. In 2021, he won the league title with the club. The club then picked up his option for the 2022 season. At the end of the 2022 season, he departed the club. He made 52 appearances in his three years with the club, with his playing time diminishing in his final year, after losing his starting spot after having suffered an injury.

In December 2022, he signed with Valour FC for the 2023 season. He struggled with multiple injuries during his first season with the club, being limited to just 903 minutes in 14 appearances.

== International career ==
In 2008, he represented Canada at the U12 Danone Nations Cup, where he served as a team captain.

In November 2011, he made his debut in the Canadian national program, attending a camp with the Canada U15 team. In 2013, he played with the Canada U17 team, winning the bronze medal at the 2013 CONCACAF U-17 Championship. and was named to the tournament Best XI, He scored in the bronze medal match, as well as in the penalty shootout, to help the squad win the bronze medal. Through their performance, he helped them to qualify for the 2013 FIFA U-17 World Cup. He appeared in all three of the team's matches at the World Cup.

In July 2014, he was named to the Canada U20 team for the 2014 Dale Farm Milk Cup. He was later to the squad for the 2015 CONCACAF U-20 Championship.

== Career statistics ==
As of October 1, 2024

Club	Season	League			Playoffs		Domestic Cup		Other		Total	
Club	Season	Division	Apps	Goals	Apps	Goals	Apps	Goals	Apps	Goals	Apps	Goals
Vancouver Whitecaps U23	2014	Premier Development League	8	0	?	?	–		–		8	0
Whitecaps FC 2	2015	USL	16	0	–		–		–		16	0
Whitecaps FC 2	2016	USL	14	1	0	0	–		–		14	1
Whitecaps FC 2	Total		30	1	0	0	0	0	0	0	30	1
OKC Energy U23	2017	Premier Development League	13	0	1	0	1	0	–		15	0
Vaughan Azzurri	2017	League1 Ontario	6	0	–		–		1 (Note: Appearance(s) in League1 Ontario League Cup)	0	15	0
Calgary Foothills FC	2018	Premier Development League	12	0	0	0	–		–		12	0
TSS FC Rovers	2019	USL League Two	14	0	–		–		–		14	0
Pacific FC	2020	Canadian Premier League	8	0	–		–		–		22	3
Pacific FC	2021	Canadian Premier League	24	0	2	0	3	0	–		29	0
Pacific FC	2022	Canadian Premier League	16	0	0	0	0	0	0 (Note: Appearance(s) in CONCACAF League)	0	16	0
Pacific FC	Total		48	0	2	0	3	0	0	0	53	0
Valour FC	2023	Canadian Premier League	14	0	–		0	0	–		11	0
Valour FC	2024	Canadian Premier League	9	0	–		1	0	–		10	0
Valour FC	Total		23	0	0	0	1	0	0	0	24	0
Career total			154	1	3	0	5	0	1	0	163	1
