= Hagamos Political Party =

Political party in Paraguay

Hagamos Political Party Partido Político Hagamos
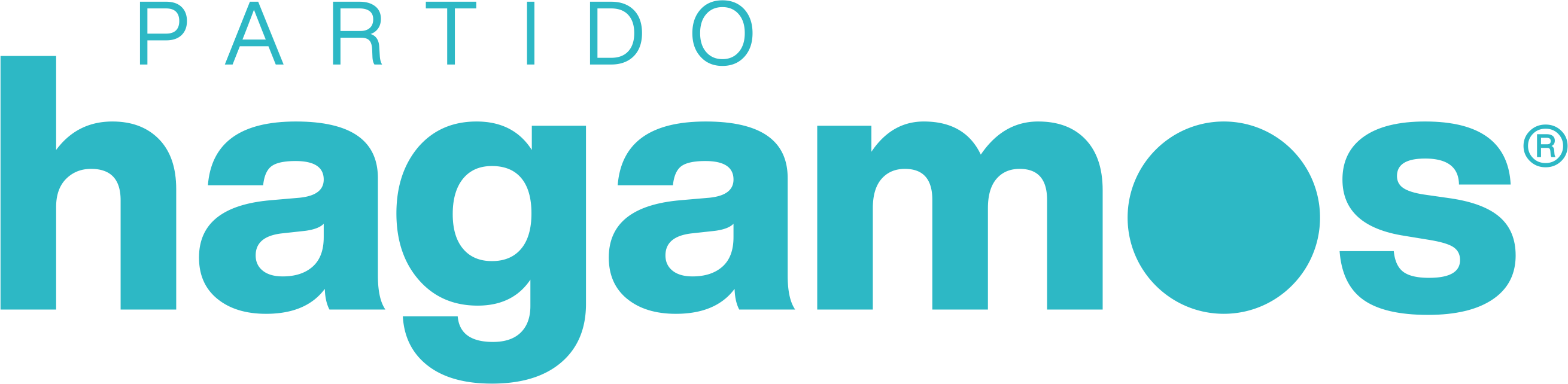
- President: Eduardo Viedma
- Founded: March 1, 2016; 10 years ago
- Headquarters: Asunción
- Ideology: Progressivism
- Political position: Center
- Slogan: Let's make it happen
- Senate: 0 / 45
- Deputies: 1 / 80
- Councilmen: 12 / 2,640

Website
- Partido Político Hagamos

The Hagamos Political Party (Spanish: Partido Político Hagamos, PPH) is a Paraguayan political party founded in March 2016.

== Ideology ==
The Hagamos Political Party defines itself as a centrist political platform, described as oriented "towards the construction of a pluralist, democratic and progressive state, oriented towards all social classes, but with special emphasis on youth".

== History ==
After its creation in 2016, the party filed candidacies in the 2018 general elections, winning two seats in the Senate and two seats in the Chamber of Deputies.

In the 2023 general elections, in which the party ran for Congress in alliance with the National Encounter Party, it won a seat for the Senate (Patrick Kemper) and one for the Chamber of Deputies (Rubén Rubín) respectively. However, on 9 March 2024, Kemper joined the Colorado Party, abandoning the party in the process, and ten days later, on 19 March, Rubín resigned from the party and declared himself independent, citing as reasons Kemper's defection and the fact that Eduardo Viedma, who was elected to succeed Kemper as party president, was a Kemper supporter, and thus the party lost its representation in Congress.
