= Luis Zuñiga =

Chilean boxer

Personal information
- Nationality: Chilean
- Born: 4 July 1939
- Died: 5 October 2018 (aged 79)

Sport
- Sport: Boxing

Luis Zuñiga (4 July 1939 – 5 October 2018) was a Chilean boxer. He competed in the men's lightweight event at the 1964 Summer Olympics.
