= Mario Inchausti =

Cuban footballer (1915–2006)

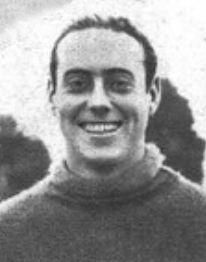
- Inchausti in 1940

Personal information
- Full name: Mario Inchausti Goitia
- Date of birth: 3 June 1915
- Place of birth: Caibarién, Cuba
- Date of death: 2 May 2006 (aged 90)
- Place of death: Zaragoza, Spain
- Height: 1.90 m (6 ft 3 in)
- Position: Goalkeeper

Senior career*
Years	Team	Apps	(Gls)
1934–1940	Real Zaragoza		
1940–1942	Real Betis		
1942	Real Madrid		
1942	Real Zaragoza		
- * Club domestic league appearances and goals

Mario Inchausti Goitia (3 June 1915 – 2 May 2006) was a Cuban footballer.

== Club career ==
Born in Caibarién, Cuba, he emigrated to Spain aged 10 and played for Real Zaragoza, Real Betis and Real Madrid, before retiring in 1942 due to injury.
