= Derlis Maidana =

Paraguayan politician (born 1975)

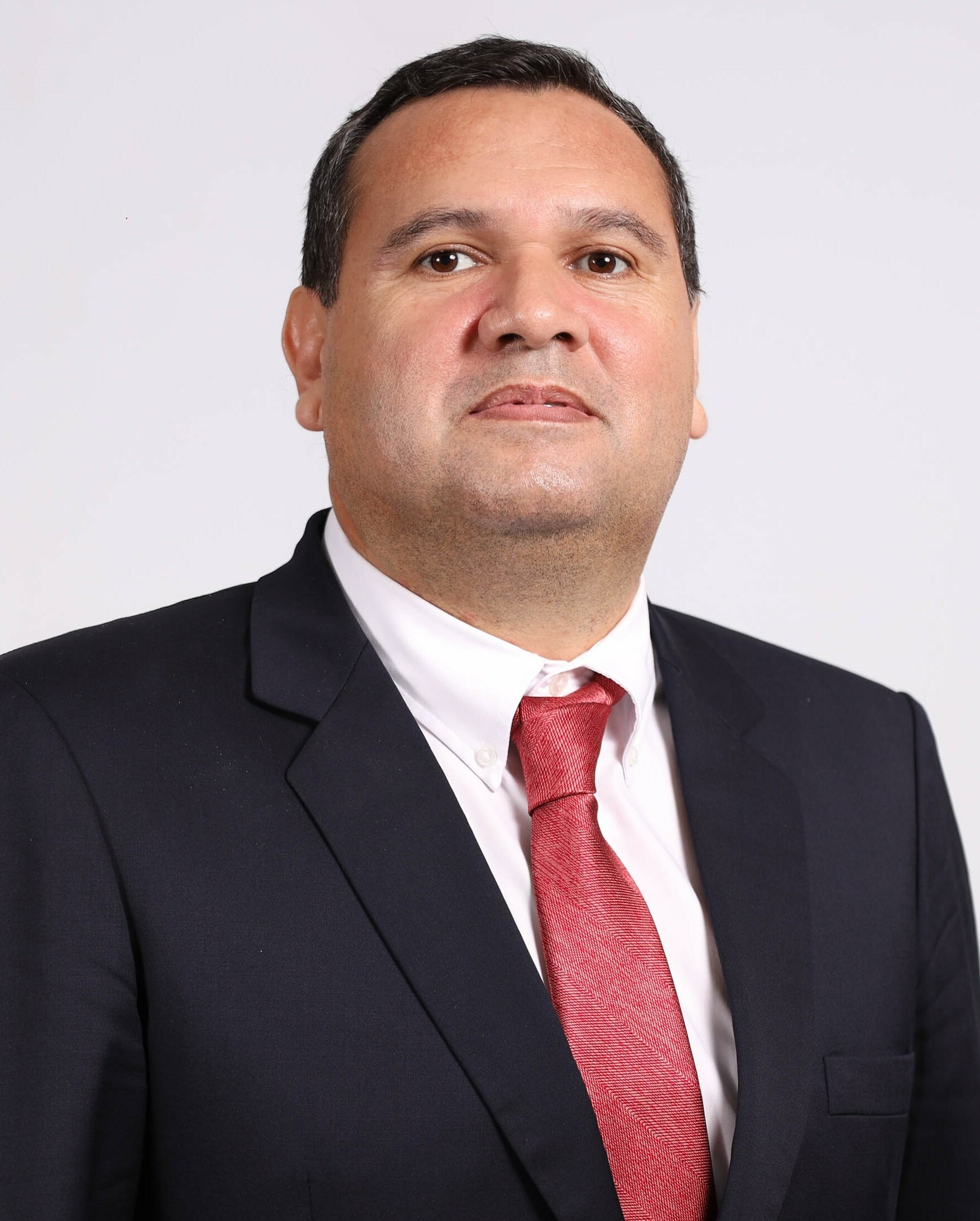
- Maidana in 2023

Member of the Senate
- Incumbent
- Assumed office 30 June 2023

Personal details
- Born: 11 August 1975 (age 50)
- Party: Colorado Party

Derlis Hernán Maidana Zarza (born 11 August 1975) is a Paraguayan politician serving as a member of the Senate since 2023. From 2018 to 2023, he was a member of the Chamber of Deputies. From 2013 to 2018, he served as governor of Misiones.
