= 2019 CONCACAF U-17 Championship squads =

Soccer tournament squads list

This is a squad list for the 2019 CONCACAF U-17 Championship, the continental association football tournament for players under the age of 17. Each national team was allowed to choose twenty players to represent their country in the tournament. All players born on or after 1 January 2002 were eligible to play the tournament.

== Group E ==
=== Mexico ===
Head coach:

No.	Pos.	Player	Date of birth (age)	Club
1	GK	Eduardo García	11 July 2002 (aged 16)	(Mexican Football Federation) Guadalajara
2	DF	José Ruiz	27 March 2002 (aged 17)	(Mexican Football Federation) Guadalajara
3	DF	Víctor Guzmán	7 March 2002 (aged 17)	(Mexican Football Federation) Tijuana
4	DF	Alejandro Gómez	31 January 2002 (aged 17)	(Mexican Football Federation) Atlas
5	DF	Rafael Martínez	12 October 2002 (aged 16)	(Mexican Football Federation) Atlas
6	MF	Eugenio Pizzuto	13 May 2002 (aged 16)	(Mexican Football Federation) Pachuca
7	MF	Gustavo Armas	1 June 2002 (aged 16)	(Mexican Football Federation) Atlas
8	DF	Kevin Ortega	4 January 2002 (aged 17)	(Mexican Football Federation) Pachuca
9	FW	Leonardo Correa	8 January 2002 (aged 17)	(Mexican Football Federation) Atlas
10	FW	Israel Luna	23 March 2002 (aged 17)	(Mexican Football Federation) Pachuca
11	MF	Bryan González	10 April 2003 (aged 16)	(Mexican Football Federation) Pachuca
12	GK	Arturo Delgado	18 February 2002 (aged 17)	(Mexican Football Federation) UANL
13	DF	Emilio Lara	18 May 2002 (aged 16)	(Mexican Football Federation) América
14	DF	Abraham Flores	14 July 2002 (aged 16)	(Mexican Football Federation) Tijuana
15	MF	Josué Martínez	28 March 2002 (aged 17)	(Mexican Football Federation) Monterrey
16	MF	Kevin Mariscal	19 May 2002 (aged 16)	(Mexican Football Federation) Guadalajara
17	FW	Luis Carlos Armas	1 June 2002 (aged 16)	(Mexican Football Federation) Atlas
18	FW	Efraín Álvarez	19 June 2002 (aged 16)	(United States Soccer Federation) LA Galaxy
19	FW	Santiago Muñoz	14 August 2002 (aged 16)	(Mexican Football Federation) Santos Laguna
20	MF	Bruce El-mesmari	23 April 2002 (aged 17)	(Mexican Football Federation) Pachuca

=== Jamaica ===
Head coach:

No.	Pos.	Player	Date of birth (age)	Club
1	GK	Zemioy Omarian Nash	19 January 2002 (aged 17)	
2	DF	Lamonth Beres Rochester	10 June 2003 (aged 15)	
3	DF	Prince Fitzgerald Christie	26 February 2003 (aged 16)	
4	DF	Damian Andrew Jones	10 July 2002 (aged 16)	
5	DF	Scott Jared Mcleod	24 November 2002 (aged 16)	
6	DF	Kenroy Campbell	3 May 2002 (aged 16)	
7	MF	Dwayne Atkinson	5 May 2002 (aged 16)	
8	FW	Gregory Anthony Cousins	1 June 2003 (aged 15)	
9	MF	Orrett Orlando Maine	20 November 2002 (aged 16)	
10	MF	Jamone Anthony Shepherd	9 April 2002 (aged 17)	
11	FW	Revaldo Mitchell	10 March 2002 (aged 17)	
12	MF	Cristojaye Damarrio Daley	23 August 2002 (aged 16)	
13	GK	Hasani Domonic Barnes	17 May 2002 (aged 16)	
14	MF	Isaac Emmnanuel Scott	8 January 2002 (aged 17)	
15	FW	Giovanni Kevaughn Mitto	10 December 2002 (aged 16)	
16	FW	Rajay Wright	26 January 2002 (aged 17)	
17	MF	Kenroy Rupert Leslie Stoddart	19 May 2002 (aged 16)	
18	DF	Dandre Shaheed Miller	23 January 2002 (aged 17)	
19	FW	Tajay Ajani Grant	12 January 2002 (aged 17)	
20	GK	Shamar Warren Haffenden	16 March 2002 (aged 17)	

=== Trinidad and Tobago ===
Head coach:

No.	Pos.	Player	Date of birth (age)	Club
1	GK	Isaiah Williams	13 December 2002 (aged 16)	
2	DF	Nigel Carraby	24 January 2003 (aged 16)	
3	DF	Luke Savary	8 December 2002 (aged 16)	
4	DF	Jordon Britto	11 February 2002 (aged 17)	
5	DF	Cephas St Rose	21 February 2002 (aged 17)	
6	MF	Zachery Welch	4 June 2002 (aged 16)	
7	MF	Jaiye Sheppard	16 February 2002 (aged 17)	
8	MF	Tyrese Pierre	4 May 2002 (aged 16)	
9	FW	Justin Araujo-Wilson	26 August 2002 (aged 16)	
10	MF	Andrew De Gannes	9 April 2003 (aged 16)	
11	FW	Jean Heim Mc Fee	1 March 2003 (aged 16)	
12	MF	Curtis De Leon	8 September 2003 (aged 15)	
13	MF	Gary Griffith	22 October 2002 (aged 16)	
14	MF	Jerrell Nixon	18 April 2002 (aged 17)	
15	MF	Jeremy Lashley	16 June 2003 (aged 15)	
16	MF	Keilon Burnett-Acevaro	3 April 2002 (aged 17)	
17	MF	Keevan Kahoussi	3 May 2002 (aged 16)	
18	MF	Isa Sayeed	30 January 2002 (aged 17)	
19	MF	Ajani Fortune	30 December 2002 (aged 16)	
20	GK	Kahail Oliver	31 May 2002 (aged 16)	

=== Bermuda ===
Head coach:

No.	Pos.	Player	Date of birth (age)	Club
1	GK	Ayleal Dill	5 August 2002 (aged 16)	
2	MF	Zakiyah Lee	16 January 2002 (aged 17)	
3	MF	Oyinde Bascome	31 August 2002 (aged 16)	
4	DF	Arnezha Astwood	18 February 2002 (aged 17)	
5	DF	Nahje Smith	23 January 2002 (aged 17)	
6	MF	Malachi Trott	20 April 2002 (aged 17)	
7	MF	Nazuri Dailey	9 May 2003 (aged 15)	
8	MF	Jayden Ebbin	4 May 2002 (aged 16)	
9	FW	Seke Spence	25 January 2002 (aged 17)	
10	MF	Leroy Lewis	4 November 2003 (aged 15)	
11	MF	Ne-jai Tucker	20 August 2002 (aged 16)	
12	GK	Coleridge Fubler	30 October 2003 (aged 15)	
13	DF	Mazhi Simmons	6 August 2002 (aged 16)	
14	FW	Manoj Paynter	13 August 2002 (aged 16)	
15	FW	Diione Millett	17 July 2002 (aged 16)	
16	DF	Samori Greenidge-saltus	20 September 2002 (aged 16)	
17	DF	Rayquon Woodley-smith	4 August 2002 (aged 16)	
18	MF	Zaire Smith	19 November 2002 (aged 16)	
19	MF	Jayce Basden	19 April 2002 (aged 17)	
20	MF	Jai Bean	16 January 2002 (aged 17)	

|}

== Group F ==
=== United States ===
Head coach: (Switzerland) Raphaël Wicky

No.	Pos.	Player	Date of birth (age)	Caps	Goals	Club
1	GK	Damian Las	April 11, 2002 (aged 17)	13	0	(United States Soccer Federation) Chicago Fire
12	GK	Chituru Odunze	October 14, 2002 (aged 16)	4	0	(Canadian Soccer Association) Vancouver Whitecaps FC
2	DF	Joseph Scally	December 31, 2002 (aged 16)	14	1	(United States Soccer Federation) New York City FC
3	DF	Adam Armour	September 27, 2002 (aged 16)	11	0	(United States Soccer Federation) North Carolina FC
4	DF	Axel Alejandre	August 2, 2002 (aged 16)	14	0	(United States Soccer Federation) Chicago FC United
5	DF	Kobe Hernandez-Foster	June 26, 2002 (aged 16)	14	1	(United States Soccer Federation) LA Galaxy
13	DF	Mauricio Cuevas	February 10, 2003 (aged 16)	2	0	(United States Soccer Federation) LA Galaxy
14	DF	Tayvon Gray	August 19, 2002 (aged 16)	10	0	(United States Soccer Federation) New York City FC
15	DF	John Tolkin	July 31, 2002 (aged 16)	3	0	(United States Soccer Federation) New York Red Bulls
6	MF	Danny Leyva	May 5, 2003 (aged 15)	0	0	(United States Soccer Federation) Seattle Sounders FC
7	MF	Gianluca Busio	May 28, 2002 (aged 16)	7	2	(United States Soccer Federation) Sporting Kansas City
8	MF	Bryang Kayo	July 27, 2002 (aged 16)	0	0	(United States Soccer Federation) Loudoun United FC
16	MF	Adam Saldana	February 7, 2002 (aged 17)	17	1	(United States Soccer Federation) LA Galaxy
20	MF	Gilbert Fuentes	February 21, 2002 (aged 17)	13	0	(United States Soccer Federation) San Jose Earthquakes
9	FW	Ricardo Pepi	January 9, 2003 (aged 16)	6	1	(United States Soccer Federation) North Texas SC
10	FW	Giovanni Reyna	November 13, 2002 (aged 16)	8	1	Unattached
11	FW	Griffin Yow	May 9, 2002 (aged 16)	6	3	(United States Soccer Federation) D.C. United
17	FW	Tyler Freeman	January 9, 2003 (aged 16)	3	1	(United States Soccer Federation) Sporting Kansas City
18	FW	Jack de Vries	March 28, 2002 (aged 17)	0	0	(United States Soccer Federation) Philadelphia Union
19	FW	Alfonso Ocampo-Chavez	March 25, 2002 (aged 17)	14	5	(United States Soccer Federation) Seattle Sounders FC

=== Canada ===
Head coach: Andrew Olivieri

No.	Pos.	Player	Date of birth (age)	Club
1	GK	Marc Kouadio	12 February 2002 (aged 17)	(United States Soccer Federation) Montverde Academy
2	DF	Keesean Ferdinand	17 August 2003 (aged 15)	(Canadian Soccer Association) Montreal Impact
3	DF	Rohan Goulbourne	1 April 2002 (aged 17)	(Canadian Soccer Association) Toronto FC
4	MF	Damiano Pecile	11 April 2002 (aged 17)	(Canadian Soccer Association) Vancouver Whitecaps FC
5	DF	Gianfranco Facchineri	27 April 2002 (aged 17)	(Canadian Soccer Association) Vancouver Whitecaps FC
6	DF	Maxime Bourgeois	4 July 2002 (aged 16)	(Canadian Soccer Association) Montreal Impact
7	FW	Kamron Habibullah	23 October 2003 (aged 15)	(Canadian Soccer Association) Vancouver Whitecaps FC
8	MF	Tomas Giraldo	8 March 2003 (aged 16)	(Canadian Soccer Association) Montreal Impact
9	FW	Jacen Russell-Rowe	13 September 2002 (aged 16)	(Canadian Soccer Association) Toronto FC
10	MF	Simon Colyn	23 March 2002 (aged 17)	(Canadian Soccer Association) Vancouver Whitecaps FC
11	FW	Jayden Nelson	26 September 2002 (aged 16)	(Canadian Soccer Association) Toronto FC
12	DF	Deylen Vellios	26 February 2002 (aged 17)	(Canadian Soccer Association) Vancouver Whitecaps FC
13	MF	Matthew Catavolo	13 February 2003 (aged 16)	(Canadian Soccer Association) Montreal Impact
14	DF	David Amla	18 October 2002 (aged 16)	(Canadian Soccer Association) Montreal Impact
15	DF	Nathan Demian	16 March 2002 (aged 17)	(Canadian Soccer Association) Vancouver Whitecaps FC
16	MF	Jamie Dunning	15 February 2002 (aged 17)	(Royal Dutch Football Association) Feyenoord
17	FW	Jérémie Omeonga Nkoy	7 June 2002 (aged 16)	(Canadian Soccer Association) Montreal Impact
18	GK	Benjamin Collins	6 January 2002 (aged 17)	(Canadian Soccer Association) Montreal Impact
19	MF	Ralph Priso-Mbongue	2 August 2002 (aged 16)	(Canadian Soccer Association) Toronto FC
20	MF	Julian Altobelli	4 November 2002 (aged 16)	(Canadian Soccer Association) Toronto FC

=== Guatemala ===
Head coach:

No.	Pos.	Player	Date of birth (age)	Club
1	GK	Jose Antonio Aguirre Dardon	31 August 2003 (aged 15)	
2	DF	Jose Julian Rasique Hernandez	4 December 2002 (aged 16)	
3	DF	Luis Estuardo Gutierrez Jimenez	23 April 2002 (aged 17)	
4	DF	Mathius Anderson Gaitan Romero	31 January 2003 (aged 16)	
5	MF	Josue Daniel Trujillo Herrera	6 February 2002 (aged 17)	
6	DF	Miguel Angel Ardon Santos	27 November 2002 (aged 16)	
7	MF	Carlos Alfonso Lemus Polanco	21 October 2002 (aged 16)	
8	MF	Kevin Estuardo Ramirez Siguenza	1 August 2002 (aged 16)	
9	FW	Anderson Omar Villagran Villagran	10 May 2003 (aged 15)	
10	FW	Andy Alessandro Palencia Garcia	12 May 2002 (aged 16)	
11	FW	Wilson Alexander Garcia Torres	22 February 2002 (aged 17)	
12	GK	Kenderson Alessandro Navarro Hernandez	25 February 2002 (aged 17)	
13	DF	Lucas Farias Villasenor	11 October 2002 (aged 16)	
14	MF	Edward Steven Castro	15 March 2003 (aged 16)	
15	MF	Marcelo Saraiva	17 May 2002 (aged 16)	
16	DF	Diego Rolando Santis Cayax	13 July 2002 (aged 16)	
17	MF	Jose Javier Arzu Cirici	20 February 2003 (aged 16)	
18	MF	Matteo Velasquez Caballero	25 January 2003 (aged 16)	
19	FW	Jose Mario Ortega Tinoco	13 June 2003 (aged 15)	
20	FW	Elmer William Cardoza Herrera	29 July 2002 (aged 16)	

=== Barbados ===
Head coach:

No.	Pos.	Player	Date of birth (age)	Club
1	GK	Shaquan Phillips	4 February 2002 (aged 17)	
2	MF	Ethan Bryan	29 April 2002 (aged 17)	
4	DF	Lemar Catlyn	6 December 2002 (aged 16)	
6	DF	Andre Applewhaite	3 June 2002 (aged 16)	
7	FW	Tajio James	17 December 2003 (aged 15)	
8	MF	Jahmali Hutson	20 September 2002 (aged 16)	
9	FW	Abiola Grant	17 November 2002 (aged 16)	
10	FW	Thierry Gale	1 May 2002 (aged 17)	
11	MF	Asher Jn Pierre	12 December 2002 (aged 16)	
12	MF	Roshon Gittens	5 February 2002 (aged 17)	
13	MF	Devonte Richards	27 September 2002 (aged 16)	
14	MF	Nathan Skeete	29 November 2002 (aged 16)	
15	MF	Jaylan Gilkes	28 June 2002 (aged 16)	
16	MF	Hashim Brewster	26 November 2002 (aged 16)	
17	DF	Shaquanie Phillips	17 July 2002 (aged 16)	
18	GK	Brandon Sumpter	18 September 2002 (aged 16)	
19	FW	Jamol Williams	20 April 2003 (aged 16)	
20	MF	Axel Funk	30 October 2002 (aged 16)	

== Group G ==
=== Honduras ===
Head coach: José Valladares

The 20-man squad was announced on 22 April 2019.

No.	Pos.	Player	Date of birth (age)	Club
1	GK	José Banegas	14 February 2002 (aged 17)	
2	GK	Isaac González	8 January 2002 (aged 17)	
3	DF	Roney Bernárdez	19 June 2002 (aged 16)	(National Autonomous Federation of Football of Honduras) Motagua
4	DF	José García	12 January 2002 (aged 17)	
5	DF	Jafeth Chávez	11 January 2002 (aged 17)	
6	DF	Marvin Ávila	9 March 2002 (aged 17)	(National Autonomous Federation of Football of Honduras) Motagua
7	DF	Steven Bonilla	4 January 2002 (aged 17)	
8	DF	Michael Rosales	22 August 2002 (aged 16)	
9	DF	André Orellana	30 January 2002 (aged 17)	
10	MF	Brian Sierra	4 April 2002 (aged 17)	(National Autonomous Federation of Football of Honduras) Motagua
11	MF	Elix Gómez	5 February 2003 (aged 16)	
12	MF	Antoni Chandías	3 January 2002 (aged 17)	
13	MF	Miguel Carrasco	10 June 2003 (aged 15)	
14	MF	Luis Vega	5 December 2002 (aged 16)	
15	MF	Rafael Cortez	24 March 2002 (aged 17)	
16	MF	Moisés Barahona	8 July 2002 (aged 16)	
17	MF	Carlos Palacios	9 January 2002 (aged 17)	
18	FW	José Aguilera	22 September 2002 (aged 16)	
19	FW	Marco Aceituno	28 December 2002 (aged 16)	(National Autonomous Federation of Football of Honduras) Real España
20	FW	Héctor Medrano	18 April 2002 (aged 17)	

=== Haiti ===
Head coach:

No.	Pos.	Player	Date of birth (age)	Club
1	GK	Stephner Kerweens Paul	1 February 2004 (aged 15)	
2	DF	Jean Emmanuel Geffrard	25 December 2003 (aged 15)	
3	DF	Samuel Jeanty	6 February 2002 (aged 17)	
4	MF	Kurowskybob Pierre	28 August 2002 (aged 16)	
5	DF	Stanley Guirand	15 December 2002 (aged 16)	
6	DF	Corlens Etienne	24 January 2002 (aged 17)	
7	MF	Daniel Martin	26 February 2002 (aged 17)	
8	MF	Rolph Woodley Philippe	14 November 2002 (aged 16)	
9	FW	Kervens Jolicoeur	25 August 2002 (aged 16)	
10	MF	Dany Jean	28 November 2002 (aged 16)	
11	MF	Fredler Christophe	11 January 2002 (aged 17)	
12	GK	Judler Delva	10 December 2002 (aged 16)	
13	MF	Maudwindo Germain	24 January 2002 (aged 17)	
14	DF	Woodbens Junior Ceneus	4 December 2002 (aged 16)	
15	FW	Michel Jean Loubens Pierre	6 July 2002 (aged 16)	
16	DF	Thero Rhinvil	16 March 2002 (aged 17)	
17	FW	John Junior Perpilus	25 December 2003 (aged 15)	
18	MF	Carl Fred Sainté	9 August 2002 (aged 16)	
19	MF	Marvin Andre Jules Sanz	27 August 2002 (aged 16)	
20	FW	Omre Noir Etienne	26 February 2003 (aged 16)	

=== El Salvador ===
Head coach:

No.	Pos.	Player	Date of birth (age)	Club
1	GK	Milton Alexis Martinez Gamez	29 August 2002 (aged 16)	
2	DF	Orssi Josue Rodriguez Palacios	25 August 2002 (aged 16)	
3	DF	Jaime Ramiro Delgado Somoza	21 October 2002 (aged 16)	
4	DF	Walter Israel Pineda Vasquez	4 May 2003 (aged 15)	
5	MF	Rodrigo Antonio Rodriguez Rodriguez	7 January 2002 (aged 17)	
6	MF	Alexis Mauricio Menendez Delgado	27 April 2002 (aged 17)	
7	MF	Jose Angel Ortega Zuniga	8 January 2002 (aged 17)	
8	FW	Kevin Alexander Roman Linares	17 April 2002 (aged 17)	
9	FW	Emerson Saul Mauricio Aquino	27 August 2002 (aged 16)	
10	MF	Styven Vásquez	29 October 2002 (aged 16)	
11	MF	Harold Daniel Osorio Moreno	20 August 2003 (aged 15)	
12	DF	Alejandro Ismael Henriquez Ferrufino	28 August 2002 (aged 16)	
13	DF	Gerson Antonio Ayala Bernal	27 May 2002 (aged 16)	
14	MF	Jorge Luis Flores Rodriguez	15 January 2002 (aged 17)	
15	MF	Jonathan Isaac Esquivel Olmedo	30 December 2003 (aged 15)	
16	MF	Jonathan Enrique Ramirez Santos	15 April 2002 (aged 17)	
17	MF	Meynor Gabriel Vicente Garcia	6 January 2002 (aged 17)	
18	GK	Sergio Aldair Sibrian Molina	8 July 2004 (aged 14)	
19	DF	Willian Alexander Lopez Hernandez	17 May 2002 (aged 16)	
20	MF	German Ovidio Rivera Hernandez	2 January 2002 (aged 17)	

=== Guyana ===
Head coach:

No.	Pos.	Player	Date of birth (age)	Club
1	GK	Shawn Adonis	14 May 2002 (aged 16)	
2	DF	Kevin Reddy	6 March 2003 (aged 16)	
3	DF	Jermaine Padmore	5 November 2002 (aged 16)	
4	DF	Joshua Braithwaite	21 February 2002 (aged 17)	
5	DF	Wayne Dasilva	2 February 2002 (aged 17)	
6	MF	Tyrel Khan	2 May 2002 (aged 16)	
7	FW	Orville Daniels	4 February 2003 (aged 16)	
8	MF	Jemar Harrigan	6 April 2002 (aged 17)	
9	FW	Ronaldo Rodrigues	3 May 2002 (aged 16)	
10	MF	Osafa Simpson	7 September 2002 (aged 16)	
11	DF	Omari Glasgow	22 November 2003 (aged 15)	
12	MF	Shannon Somnath	13 October 2002 (aged 16)	
13	FW	Shoran James	22 September 2004 (aged 14)	
14	MF	William Vaughan Jagmohan	25 February 2003 (aged 16)	
15	DF	Marcus Wilson	19 April 2002 (aged 17)	
16	DF	Nicolai Andrews	3 November 2002 (aged 16)	
17	FW	Ravon Bayley	22 January 2002 (aged 17)	
18	GK	Oswin Frederics	22 August 2002 (aged 16)	
19	FW	Isiah James	20 March 2002 (aged 17)	
20	GK	Ronaldo Blair	13 September 2003 (aged 15)	

== Group H ==
=== Costa Rica ===
No.	Pos.	Player	Date of birth (age)	Club
1	GK	Kendall Esteban Chaves Araya	16 August 2002 (aged 16)	(Costa Rican Football Federation) San Carlos
2	DF	Joshua David Espinoza Gomez	12 May 2002 (aged 16)	(Costa Rican Football Federation) Fútbol Consultants
3	MF	Ian Lawrence	28 May 2002 (aged 16)	(Costa Rican Football Federation) Saprissa
4	DF	Jordy Evans	17 April 2002 (aged 17)	(Costa Rican Football Federation) Saprissa
5	DF	Matthew Bolaños Garcia	5 July 2002 (aged 16)	(Costa Rican Football Federation) Saprissa
6	MF	Jose Arturo Tello Salas	3 April 2002 (aged 17)	(Costa Rican Football Federation) Cartaginés
7	FW	Geancarlo Castro Gonzalez	12 February 2002 (aged 17)	(Costa Rican Football Federation) Alajuelense
8	DF	Tommy Rodolfo Muñoz Salazar	29 January 2002 (aged 17)	(Costa Rican Football Federation) Fútbol Consultants
9	FW	Manfred Ugalde	25 May 2002 (aged 16)	(Costa Rican Football Federation) Saprissa
10	MF	Aarón Suárez	27 June 2002 (aged 16)	(Costa Rican Football Federation) Saprissa
11	MF	Andrey Soto	8 April 2003 (aged 16)	(Costa Rican Football Federation) San Carlos
12	MF	Maikel Stwart Gonzalez Chaves	10 January 2003 (aged 16)	(Costa Rican Football Federation) Alajuelense
13	DF	Sergio Esteban Cespedes Davy	24 January 2002 (aged 17)	(Costa Rican Football Federation) Saprissa
14	DF	Fabian Alvarez Montenegro	18 September 2002 (aged 16)	(Costa Rican Football Federation) Alajuelense
15	MF	Roan Wilson	1 May 2002 (aged 17)	(Costa Rican Football Federation) Limón
16	MF	Brandon Aguilera	28 June 2003 (aged 15)	(Costa Rican Football Federation) Carmelita
17	FW	Jordy Francisco Hernandez Molina	26 March 2002 (aged 17)	(Costa Rican Football Federation) Herediano
18	GK	George Keym Barrett Savage	17 August 2002 (aged 16)	(Costa Rican Football Federation) Saprissa
19	FW	Keymark Yamark Davis Kelly	8 November 2002 (aged 16)	(Costa Rican Football Federation) Saprissa
20	MF	Jean Carlo Alvarado Solis	23 February 2002 (aged 17)	(Costa Rican Football Federation) San Carlos

=== Panama ===
Head coach:

No.	Pos.	Player	Date of birth (age)	Club
1	GK	Saul Aaron Espinosa Villaverde	18 April 2002 (aged 17)	
2	DF	Modesto Arturo Justiniani Williams	6 September 2002 (aged 16)	
3	DF	Jose Abdiel Matos Ortega	8 March 2002 (aged 17)	
4	DF	Edgardo Abilio Espinosa Gonzalez	22 February 2002 (aged 17)	
5	DF	Eric Elimar Rowe Layden	10 May 2002 (aged 16)	
6	MF	Edilson Ronaldo Carrasquilla Alcazar	6 June 2002 (aged 16)	
7	MF	Jean Carlos Castillo Racero	16 February 2002 (aged 17)	
8	MF	Abdul Gadiel Knight Ceballos	17 January 2002 (aged 17)	
9	FW	Eric Emanuel Pinto Rodriguez	8 December 2002 (aged 16)	
10	FW	Reymundo Enrique Williams Arauz	17 January 2004 (aged 15)	
11	MF	Abdiel Alexander Castro Castillo	21 June 2002 (aged 16)	
12	GK	Julio Cesar Moran Pinzon	29 January 2002 (aged 17)	
13	FW	Aaron Joel Lowis Christie	12 September 2002 (aged 16)	
14	DF	Jesus Manuel Gil Geraths	25 January 2002 (aged 17)	
15	DF	Giancarlos Moreno Estrada	22 July 2002 (aged 16)	
16	MF	Wesly Alexander Acosta Concepcion	26 October 2002 (aged 16)	
17	MF	Abdel Jhamar Niles Rivera	30 June 2002 (aged 16)	
19	DF	Adrian Alberto Hernandez Noriega	4 July 2002 (aged 16)	
20	MF	Jordy Santiago Hidalgo Diaz	11 February 2002 (aged 17)	
21	MF	Jaime Juvenal Harrison Danies	29 October 2003 (aged 15)	

=== Suriname ===
No.	Pos.	Player	Date of birth (age)	Club
1	GK	Damelcio Fer	13 October 2002 (aged 16)	
2	DF	Marino Schet	1 August 2002 (aged 16)	
3	DF	Johan Lize	30 April 2002 (aged 17)	
4	DF	Zerguinho Deira	23 July 2002 (aged 16)	
5	DF	Cyrano Beeldstro	29 June 2002 (aged 16)	
6	MF	Milano Boobe	2 May 2002 (aged 16)	
7	MF	Shelton Sabajo	25 September 2002 (aged 16)	
8	MF	Chento Cayenni	14 January 2003 (aged 16)	
9	FW	Timothy Biswane	12 September 2002 (aged 16)	
10	MF	Ferando Hoepel	5 July 2002 (aged 16)	
11	DF	Faisijo Burnet	2 May 2002 (aged 16)	
12	FW	Marcelino Plet	7 April 2002 (aged 17)	
13	FW	Johaneton Deventer	26 January 2002 (aged 17)	
14	MF	Geraldo Reumel	23 February 2002 (aged 17)	
15	FW	Roche Asidan	9 June 2003 (aged 15)	
16	DF	Recklenzo Mentopawiro	15 January 2003 (aged 16)	
17	DF	Melchior Defares	28 May 2003 (aged 15)	
18	MF	Ramirez Alessandro Akrosie	5 December 2002 (aged 16)	
19	DF	Xaverio Schot	22 February 2002 (aged 17)	
20	GK	Jozua Wilson	17 August 2002 (aged 16)	

=== Curaçao ===
Head coach:

No.	Pos.	Player	Date of birth (age)	Club
1	GK	Milton Alexis Martinez Gamez	29 August 2002 (aged 16)	
2	DF	Orssi Josue Rodriguez Palacios	25 August 2002 (aged 16)	
3	DF	Jaime Ramiro Delgado Somoza	21 October 2002 (aged 16)	
4	DF	Walter Israel Pineda Vasquez	4 May 2003 (aged 15)	
5	MF	Rodrigo Antonio Rodriguez Rodriguez	7 January 2002 (aged 17)	
6	MF	Alexis Mauricio Menendez Delgado	27 April 2002 (aged 17)	
7	MF	Jose Angel Ortega Zuniga	8 January 2002 (aged 17)	
8	FW	Kevin Alexander Roman Linares	17 April 2002 (aged 17)	
9	FW	Emerson Saul Mauricio Aquino	27 August 2002 (aged 16)	
10	MF	Luis Styven Vasquez Velasquez	29 October 2002 (aged 16)	
11	MF	Harold Daniel Osorio Moreno	20 August 2003 (aged 15)	
12	DF	Alejandro Ismael Henriquez Ferrufino	28 August 2002 (aged 16)	
13	DF	Gerson Antonio Ayala Bernal	27 May 2002 (aged 16)	
14	MF	Jorge Luis Flores Rodriguez	15 January 2002 (aged 17)	
15	MF	Jonathan Isaac Esquivel Olmedo	30 December 2003 (aged 15)	
16	MF	Jonathan Enrique Ramirez Santos	15 April 2002 (aged 17)	
17	MF	Meynor Gabriel Vicente Garcia	6 January 2002 (aged 17)	
18	GK	Sergio Aldair Sibrian Molina	8 July 2004 (aged 14)	
19	DF	Willian Alexander Lopez Hernandez	17 May 2002 (aged 16)	
20	MF	German Ovidio Rivera Hernandez	2 January 2002 (aged 17)	

== Knockout stage ==
=== Nicaragua ===
Head coach:

No.	Pos.	Player	Date of birth (age)	Club
1	GK	Jeann Francisco Iglesias Gutierrez	27 November 2003 (aged 15)	
2	MF	Bryan Josue Gonzales Sandino	12 February 2002 (aged 17)	
3	DF	Justing Enrique Cano Espinoza	2 March 2002 (aged 17)	
4	DF	Franklin Junior Gonzalez Rodriguez	13 March 2002 (aged 17)	
5	DF	Francisco Javier Vallecillo Delgadillo	20 October 2002 (aged 16)	
6	MF	Harold Medina	30 January 2002 (aged 17)	
7	FW	Widman Esmir Talavera Flores	12 January 2003 (aged 16)	
8	MF	Josue Gabriel Calderon Palacios	30 May 2002 (aged 16)	
9	FW	Chris Patterson Patterson Hernandez	20 August 2002 (aged 16)	
10	MF	Ayel Anthony Palacios Pineda	22 March 2002 (aged 17)	
11	FW	Patrick Romario Huete Valenzuela	16 February 2002 (aged 17)	
12	GK	Gerald Adalberto Galeano Rodezno	1 July 2002 (aged 16)	
13	FW	Ronald Estiven Palacios Lopez	9 September 2002 (aged 16)	
14	DF	Jeynnier Antonio Rodriguez Mairena	20 February 2002 (aged 17)	
15	MF	Waldner Isai Vasquez Pineda	20 March 2002 (aged 17)	
17	DF	Leonardo Jose Bonilla Ortiz	3 September 2002 (aged 16)	
18	MF	Nestor Gabriel Olivares Nicaragua	29 August 2002 (aged 16)	
19	FW	Carlos Andres Perez Rodriguez	9 October 2003 (aged 15)	
20	MF	Chris Jeremy Lopez Oliva	13 February 2002 (aged 17)	

=== Dominican Republic ===
Head coach:

No.	Pos.	Player	Date of birth (age)	Club
1	GK	Omry Bello	28 May 2003 (aged 15)	
2	DF	Lucas William Ashley Hunter	1 September 2002 (aged 16)	
3	MF	Nadir Lora	10 March 2002 (aged 17)	
4	DF	Álex Jiménez	13 January 2002 (aged 17)	
5	DF	Sebastian Arturo Mañon Garcia	13 February 2003 (aged 16)	
6	MF	Carlos Liriano	8 December 2002 (aged 16)	
7	FW	Josue Baez	23 May 2002 (aged 16)	
8	MF	Juan Luis Crispin Mota	4 January 2002 (aged 17)	
9	FW	Samuel Elias Peralta Vargas	19 January 2002 (aged 17)	
10	MF	Isaac Baez	23 May 2002 (aged 16)	
11	FW	Franklin Rodriguez	23 July 2002 (aged 16)	
12	GK	Frank Luis Aquino	31 January 2003 (aged 16)	
13	MF	Gabriel Castillo Encarnacion	8 April 2003 (aged 16)	
14	MF	Alejandro Fondeur	31 October 2002 (aged 16)	
15	DF	Diego Perez	3 September 2003 (aged 15)	
16	DF	Francois Nicolas Nicacio Imbert	4 March 2002 (aged 17)	
17	FW	Jhonmany Caro Martinez	23 January 2002 (aged 17)	
18	MF	Angel Montes De Oca	18 February 2003 (aged 16)	
19	FW	Eduardo Gil Hernandez	5 December 2002 (aged 16)	
20	DF	Marcos Caffaro	9 January 2002 (aged 17)	

=== Guadeloupe ===
Head coach:

No.	Pos.	Player	Date of birth (age)	Club
1	GK	Lohan Moïse Hill	21 June 2003 (aged 15)	
2	DF	Kendrick Jean Tacalfred	24 March 2003 (aged 16)	
3	DF	Nicolas Jules Virapin	1 February 2002 (aged 17)	
4	DF	Hans Thomas Dezac	4 August 2003 (aged 15)	
5	MF	Anthony Moïse Marie-joseph	24 July 2003 (aged 15)	
6	MF	Sohan Hendrick Negrit	14 November 2002 (aged 16)	
7	DF	Hiendy Poiel Confiac	30 July 2003 (aged 15)	
8	MF	Mathis Giovanni Beziat	28 July 2003 (aged 15)	
9	FW	Thomas Alex Cesaire Gedeon	25 April 2003 (aged 16)	
10	MF	Thomas Benoit Gille	13 January 2002 (aged 17)	
11	FW	Kenny Meddy Mixtur	9 October 2003 (aged 15)	
12	FW	Jemuel Robert Lancien	14 June 2002 (aged 16)	
13	DF	Stephane Marc Baucal	14 May 2002 (aged 16)	
14	MF	Lohan Sael Molia	28 July 2002 (aged 16)	
15	MF	Louis-alexandre Clement Merabli	24 April 2003 (aged 16)	
16	GK	Nathan Lucas Aquilon	31 January 2002 (aged 17)	
17	MF	Jonael Pierre Gervelas	28 November 2002 (aged 16)	
18	MF	Youry Davy Gravelot	26 March 2002 (aged 17)	
19	MF	William Oscar Pezeron	24 February 2002 (aged 17)	
20	MF	Noah Alexandre Silo	15 July 2003 (aged 15)	

=== Puerto Rico ===
Head coach:

No.	Pos.	Player	Date of birth (age)	Club
1	GK	Ian Andres Mercado Suarez	22 April 2002 (aged 17)	
2	GK	Johan Gabriel Rodriguez Morales	3 February 2002 (aged 17)	
3	DF	Diego Uriarte	24 April 2002 (aged 17)	
4	DF	Alejandro Emanuel Lopez Olivari	22 January 2002 (aged 17)	
5	DF	Giovanni Calderón	8 February 2002 (aged 17)	
6	DF	Diego Gerena	17 March 2002 (aged 17)	
7	DF	Daniel Rosario	10 April 2002 (aged 17)	
8	DF	Jan Mateo	31 January 2003 (aged 16)	
9	MF	Zaki Kalei Obafemi	2 February 2002 (aged 17)	
10	MF	Jose Javier Hazim Sanchez	5 July 2002 (aged 16)	
11	MF	Agustin Ortega	24 July 2002 (aged 16)	Bayamon FC
12	MF	Maicol Roldan	26 March 2002 (aged 17)	
13	MF	Diego Alejandro Zayas Espinal	11 January 2002 (aged 17)	
14	MF	Jose Luis Lopez	25 March 2002 (aged 17)	
15	FW	Jorge Bermudez	12 April 2002 (aged 17)	
16	MF	Yavieric Ortiz Fuentes	21 March 2002 (aged 17)	
17	FW	Andres Javier Ramos Baez	15 December 2003 (aged 15)	
22	FW	Lucas Sandra Montez Borrilez	18 March 2003 (aged 16)	Sacramento Republic
18	FW	Leandro Antonetti	13 January 2003 (aged 16)	
19	MF	Wilfredo Rivera	14 October 2003 (aged 15)	Orlando City
20	MF	Allan Yael Agosto Pomales	17 July 2003 (aged 15)	
