= Football at the 2023 Central American and Caribbean Games – Men's team squads =

The following is a list of squads for each nation competing in football at the 2023 Central American and Caribbean Games in El Salvador.

== Group A ==
=== El Salvador ===
Head coach: (El Salvador) ?

No.	Pos.	Player	Date of birth (age)	Club
1	GK	Sergio Sibrián	8 July 2004 (aged 18)	(Salvadoran Football Federation) Once Deportivo
2	DF	José Serrano	4 December 2004 (aged 18)	(Salvadoran Football Federation) Municipal Limeño
3	DF	Melvin Cruz	15 January 2001 (aged 22)	(Salvadoran Football Federation) CD Dragón
4	DF	Walter Pineda	4 May 2003 (aged 20)	(Salvadoran Football Federation) CD Águila
5	DF	Edwin Córdova	25 March 2001 (aged 22)	(Salvadoran Football Federation) CD Marte Soyapango
6	DF	Mauricio Cerritos	17 October 2003 (aged 19)	(Salvadoran Football Federation) CD Atlético Marte
7	MF	Javier Bolaños	14 August 2001 (aged 21)	(Salvadoran Football Federation) Once Deportivo
8	MF	Rafael Tejada	12 March 2003 (aged 20)	(Salvadoran Football Federation) CD FAS Reserve
9	FW	Emerson Mauricio	27 August 2002 (aged 20)	(Salvadoran Football Federation) Alianza FC
10	FW	Enrico Hernández	23 February 2001 (aged 22)	(Royal Spanish Football Federation) FC Cartagena B
11	MF	Luis Vásquez	29 October 2002 (aged 20)	(Salvadoran Football Federation) AD Chalatenango
12	DF	Tereso Benítez	15 March 2002 (aged 21)	(Salvadoran Football Federation) Municipal Limeño
13	DF	Diego Flores	1 July 2001 (aged 21)	(Salvadoran Football Federation) CD Luis Ángel Firpo
14	FW	Juan Sánchez	6 October 2001 (aged 21)	(Salvadoran Football Federation) Once Deportivo
15	DF	Jefferson Valladares	8 October 2002 (aged 20)	(Salvadoran Football Federation) Municipal Limeño
16	MF	Elmer Bonilla	10 May 2003 (aged 20)	(Salvadoran Football Federation) CD Dragón
17	FW	Kevin Roman	17 April 2002 (aged 21)	(Salvadoran Football Federation) AD Isidro Metapán
18	GK	Adriel Martínez	13 December 2001 (aged 21)	(Royal Spanish Football Federation) CF Motril
19	FW	Styven Vásquez	4 February 2001 (aged 22)	(Salvadoran Football Federation) CD Luis Ángel Firpo
20	DF	Diego Lemus	4 March 2003 (aged 20)	(Salvadoran Football Federation) Santa Tecla FC

=== Dominican Republic ===
Head coach: (Dominican Republic) Marcelo Neveleff

No.	Pos.	Player	Date of birth (age)	Club
1	GK	Omry Bello	28 May 2003 (aged 20)	(Dominican Football Federation) O&M FC
2	DF	José Calvo	9 October 2002 (aged 20)	(Dominican Football Federation) Atlético Vega Real
3	DF	Joao Urbáez	24 July 2002 (aged 20)	(Royal Spanish Football Federation) AD Alcorcón B
4	DF	Alejandro Jiménez	13 January 2002 (aged 21)	(Royal Spanish Football Federation) CP San Cristóbal
5	MF	Kleffer Martes	13 January 2003 (aged 20)	(Dominican Football Federation) Atlético Pantoja
6	MF	Isaac Báez	23 May 2002 (aged 21)	(Dominican Football Federation) O&M FC
7	FW	Josué Báez	23 May 2002 (aged 21)	(Dominican Football Federation) O&M FC
8	MF	Ángel Montes de Oca	18 February 2003 (aged 20)	(Dominican Football Federation) Cibao FC
9	FW	Anyelo Gómez	2 January 2003 (aged 20)	(Dominican Football Federation) Don Bosco Jarabacoa FC
10	MF	Fabian Messina	16 September 2002 (aged 20)	(German Football Association) FSV Frankfurt
11	FW	Nowend Lorenzo	2 November 2002 (aged 20)	(Royal Spanish Football Federation) CD Izarra
12	GK	Enzo Guzmán	22 August 2002 (aged 20)	(Dominican Football Federation) Cibao FC
13	DF	Víctor Morales	3 January 2002 (aged 21)	(Dominican Football Federation) Atlético Vega Real
14	MF	Jayson Made	7 September 2001 (aged 21)	(Dominican Football Federation) Atlético Pantoja
15	MF	Steven Martínez	10 September 2003 (aged 19)	(Dominican Football Federation) Atlético Vega Real
16	MF	Yunior Peralta	2 February 2004 (aged 19)	(Dominican Football Federation) Cibao FC II
17	MF	Jason Yambatis	21 March 2003 (aged 20)	(Dominican Football Federation) Atlético Pantoja
18	FW	Alfeni Tamárez	14 June 2003 (aged 20)	(Dominican Football Federation) Atlético Pantoja
19	FW	Guillermo de Peña	22 July 2003 (aged 19)	(Dominican Football Federation) Moca FC
20	FW	Edwarlyn Reyes	2 May 2004 (aged 19)	(Dominican Football Federation) Cibao FC II

=== Mexico ===
Head coach: (Mexico) Gerardo Espinoza

No.	Pos.	Player	Date of birth (age)	Club
1	GK	Eduardo García	11 July 2002 (aged 20)	(Mexican Football Federation) Tapatío
2	MF	Miguel Gómez	29 September 2002 (aged 20)	(Mexican Football Federation) Tapatío
3	DF	Diego Campillo	19 October 2001 (aged 21)	(Mexican Football Federation) Juárez
4	DF	Alejandro Gómez	31 January 2002 (aged 21)	(Mexican Football Federation) Santos Laguna
5	DF	Isaías Violante	20 October 2003 (aged 19)	(Mexican Football Federation) Toluca
6	MF	Fidel Ambríz	21 March 2003 (aged 20)	(Mexican Football Federation) León
7	MF	Bryan González	10 April 2003 (aged 20)	(Mexican Football Federation) Pachuca
8	MF	Rodrigo López	12 November 2001 (aged 21)	(Mexican Football Federation) Querétaro
9	FW	Ricardo Monreal	10 February 2001 (aged 22)	(Mexican Football Federation) Necaxa
10	MF	Jordan Carrillo	11 March 2001 (aged 22)	(Royal Spanish Football Federation) Sporting de Gijón
11	FW	Eduardo Armenta	16 December 2001 (aged 21)	(Mexican Football Federation) Tijuana
12	GK	Fernando Tapia	17 June 2001 (aged 22)	(Mexican Football Federation) Venados
13	DF	Rafael Guerrero	13 January 2003 (aged 20)	(Mexican Football Federation) Cruz Azul
14	MF	Gael García	12 February 2004 (aged 19)	(Mexican Football Federation) Guadalajara U20
15	DF	Óscar Villa	24 February 2001 (aged 22)	(Mexican Football Federation) León
16	FW	Alí Ávila	23 September 2003 (aged 19)	(Mexican Football Federation) Monterrey
17	FW	Ettson Ayón	26 March 2001 (aged 22)	(Mexican Football Federation) Querétaro
18	FW	Rodrigo Huescas	18 September 2003 (aged 19)	(Mexican Football Federation) Cruz Azul
19	FW	Zahid Muñoz	29 January 2001 (aged 22)	(Mexican Football Federation) Guadalajara
20	MF	Denzell García	15 August 2003 (aged 19)	(Mexican Football Federation) Juárez

== Group B ==
=== Centro Caribe Sports ===
Head coach: (Guatemala) Rigoberto Gómez

No.	Pos.	Player	Date of birth (age)	Club
1	GK	David Aldana	24 April 2003 (aged 20)	(National Football Federation of Guatemala) CSD Municipal
2	DF	Francisco López (c)	16 May 2002 (aged 21)	(National Football Federation of Guatemala) Club Xelajú MC
3	DF	Fredy Gálvez	11 May 2001 (aged 22)	(National Football Federation of Guatemala) Deportivo Xinabajul
4	DF	Jeshua Urizar	19 October 2004 (aged 18)	(National Football Federation of Guatemala) Deportivo Mixco
5	DF	Diego Méndez	14 April 2001 (aged 22)	(National Football Federation of Guatemala) Deportivo Mixco
6	MF	Kevin Ramírez	1 August 2002 (aged 20)	(National Football Federation of Guatemala) CD Malacateco
7	MF	Javier Estrada	18 December 2001 (aged 21)	(National Football Federation of Guatemala) CD Suchitepéquez
8	FW	Dennis Ramírez	19 August 2001 (aged 21)	(National Football Federation of Guatemala) Antigua GFC
9	FW	Erick Lemus	5 February 2001 (aged 22)	(National Football Federation of Guatemala) Deportivo Achuapa
10	FW	José Ochoa	3 February 2001 (aged 22)	(National Football Federation of Guatemala) CD Malacateco
11	FW	Andersson Ortiz	7 November 2001 (aged 21)	(National Football Federation of Guatemala) CD Guastatoya
12	GK	Kenderson Navarro	25 February 2002 (aged 21)	(National Football Federation of Guatemala) CSD Municipal
13	FW	Jonathan Dieguez	13 December 2002 (aged 20)	(National Football Federation of Guatemala) Deportivo Iztapa
14	MF	Jonathan Franco	26 July 2003 (aged 19)	(National Football Federation of Guatemala) CSD Municipal
15	MF	Figo Montaño	7 April 2004 (aged 19)	(National Football Federation of Guatemala) CSD Municipal
16	FW	Diego Santis	13 July 2002 (aged 20)	(National Football Federation of Guatemala) Comunicaciones FC
17	FW	Elmer Cardoza	29 July 2002 (aged 20)	(National Football Federation of Guatemala) Club Xelajú MC
18	FW	William Fajardo	26 January 2001 (aged 22)	(National Football Federation of Guatemala) Deportivo Achuapa
19	FW	Vidal Paz	4 August 2001 (aged 21)	(National Football Federation of Guatemala) Deportivo Iztapa
20	MF	Brayam Castañeda	14 December 2001 (aged 21)	(National Football Federation of Guatemala) Comunicaciones FC

=== Costa Rica ===
Head coach: (Costa Rica) Erick Rodríguez Santamaría

No.	Pos.	Player	Date of birth (age)	Club
1	GK	Bayron Mora	5 March 2003 (aged 20)	(Costa Rican Football Federation) AD San Carlos
2	DF	Keral Ríos	5 May 2003 (aged 20)	(Costa Rican Football Federation) AD Municipal Pérez Zeledón
3	DF	Jorkaeff Azofeifa	9 February 2001 (aged 22)	(Costa Rican Football Federation) Guadalupe FC
4	DF	Douglas Sequeira	16 September 2003 (aged 19)	(Costa Rican Football Federation) Santos de Guápiles FC
5	FW	Andry Naranjo	7 October 2006 (aged 16)	(Costa Rican Football Federation) ADR Jicaral
7	FW	Kenneth Vargas	17 April 2002 (aged 21)	(Costa Rican Football Federation) CS Herediano
8	MF	Alejandro Bran	1 March 2001 (aged 22)	(Costa Rican Football Federation) AD Guanacasteca
9	FW	Doryan Rodríguez	18 January 2003 (aged 20)	(Costa Rican Football Federation) Liga Deportiva Alajuelense
11	DF	Gerald Taylor	28 May 2001 (aged 22)	(Costa Rican Football Federation) Deportivo Saprissa
12	FW	Álvaro Zamora	9 March 2002 (aged 21)	(Costa Rican Football Federation) Deportivo Saprissa
13	DF	Guillermo Villalobos	7 June 2001 (aged 22)	(Costa Rican Football Federation) AD Municipal Pérez Zeledón
14	MF	Andrey Soto	8 April 2003 (aged 20)	(Costa Rican Football Federation) AD San Carlos
15	DF	Matthew Bolaños	5 July 2002 (aged 20)	(Costa Rican Football Federation) Municipal Grecia
16	FW	Jostin Tellería	10 April 2003 (aged 20)	(Costa Rican Football Federation) AD San Carlos
17	FW	Sebastian Acuña (c)	25 June 2002 (aged 21)	(Costa Rican Football Federation) AD San Carlos
18	GK	Abraham Madriz	2 April 2004 (aged 19)	(Costa Rican Football Federation) Deportivo Saprissa
19	DF	Jordy Evans	17 April 2002 (aged 21)	(Costa Rican Football Federation) Deportivo Saprissa
20	FW	Joshua Parra	27 April 2001 (aged 22)	(Costa Rican Football Federation) AD Municipal Pérez Zeledón

=== Honduras ===
Head coach: (Honduras) Luis Alvarado

No.	Pos.	Player	Date of birth (age)	Club
1	GK	Juergen García	28 January 2005 (aged 18)	(National Autonomous Federation of Football of Honduras) Lone FC
2	MF	José Aguilera	25 February 2002 (aged 21)	(National Autonomous Federation of Football of Honduras) CD Marathón
3	DF	Junior García	7 October 2001 (aged 21)	(National Autonomous Federation of Football of Honduras) Real CD España
4	DF	Anfronit Tatum	2 June 2005 (aged 18)	(National Autonomous Federation of Football of Honduras) Real CD España Reserve
5	MF	Jeffrey Miranda	3 September 2002 (aged 20)	(National Autonomous Federation of Football of Honduras) CD Marathón
6	DF	Jonathan Núñez (c)	26 November 2001 (aged 21)	(National Autonomous Federation of Football of Honduras) FC Motagua
7	MF	Samuel Elvir	25 April 2001 (aged 22)	(National Autonomous Federation of Football of Honduras) FC Motagua
8	MF	Carlos Matute	2 February 2002 (aged 21)	(National Autonomous Federation of Football of Honduras) CD Victoria
9	MF	Figueroa Arzú	20 April 2001 (aged 22)	(National Autonomous Federation of Football of Honduras) Lobos UPNFM
10	DF	Pablo Cacho	29 September 2001 (aged 21)	(National Autonomous Federation of Football of Honduras) Platense FC
11	FW	Marco Aceituno	28 December 2003 (aged 19)	(National Autonomous Federation of Football of Honduras) Real CD España
12	GK	Edwin Marín	30 March 2001 (aged 22)	(National Autonomous Federation of Football of Honduras) CD Marathón
13	FW	José Domínguez	29 July 2001 (aged 21)	(National Autonomous Federation of Football of Honduras) CD Honduras Progreso
14	FW	Dixon Ramírez	15 April 2001 (aged 22)	(National Autonomous Federation of Football of Honduras) CD Honduras Progreso
15	MF	Dester Monico	18 July 2001 (aged 21)	(National Autonomous Federation of Football of Honduras) CD Real Sociedad
16	MF	Axel Maldonado	24 July 2001 (aged 21)	(National Autonomous Federation of Football of Honduras) CD Olimpia
17	MF	Exon Arzú	19 May 2004 (aged 19)	(National Autonomous Federation of Football of Honduras) Real CD España
18	MF	Ted Bodden	21 April 2001 (aged 22)	(National Autonomous Federation of Football of Honduras) Lobos UPNFM
19	FW	Jefryn Macías	2 January 2004 (aged 19)	(National Autonomous Federation of Football of Honduras) Lobos UPNFM
20	MF	Moisés Rodríguez	13 August 2002 (aged 20)	(National Autonomous Federation of Football of Honduras) CD Olimpia

=== Jamaica ===
Head coach: (Jamaica) ?

No.	Pos.	Player	Date of birth (age)	Club
1	GK	Anthony Bennet	17 July 2004 (aged 18)	(Jamaica Football Federation) Harbour View FC
2	GK	Daniel Russell	10 February 2001 (aged 22)	(Jamaica Football Federation) Mount Pleasant FA
3	DF	Christopher Matthews	6 August 2001 (aged 21)	(Jamaica Football Federation) Tivoli Gardens FC
4	FW	Steven Young	22 July 2001 (aged 21)	(Jamaica Football Federation) Portmore United FC
5	DF	Adrian Reid	5 September 2006 (aged 16)	(Jamaica Football Federation) Cavalier FC
6	DF	Romain Blake	24 July 2005 (aged 17)	(Jamaica Football Federation) Waterhouse FC
7	MF	Jahshaun Anglin (c)	6 May 2001 (aged 22)	(Jamaica Football Federation) Harbour View FC
8	FW	Jaheim Thomas	21 June 2003 (aged 20)	(Jamaica Football Federation) Arnett Gardens FC
9	FW	Marlon Allen	14 June 2001 (aged 22)	(Jamaica Football Federation) Arnett Gardens FC
10	MF	Cristojaye Daley	23 July 2002 (aged 20)	(Jamaica Football Federation) Harbour View FC
11	MF	Devonte Campbell	25 October 2003 (aged 19)	(Jamaica Football Federation) Mount Pleasant FA
12	MF	George Grant	9 April 2006 (aged 17)	(The Football Association) Middlesbrough FC U-18
13	GK	Asher Hutchinson	4 December 2004 (aged 18)	(Jamaica Football Federation) Arnett Gardens FC
14	GK	Brandon Cover	28 October 2003 (aged 19)	(The Football Association) Leicester City FC U-21
15	MF	Ronaldo Webster	4 July 2001 (aged 21)	(Jamaica Football Federation) Cavalier FC
16	DF	Matthew Baker	9 October 2003 (aged 19)	(Jamaica Football Federation) Athlone Town AFC
17	MF	Shaniel Thomas	14 September 2001 (aged 21)	(Jamaica Football Federation) Cavalier FC
18	MF	Tyler Roberts	4 November 2003 (aged 19)	(The Football Association) Doncaster Rovers FC
19	DF	Phillando Wing	27 January 2003 (aged 20)	(Jamaica Football Federation) Arnett Gardens FC
10	FW	Rushike Kelson	17 November 2002 (aged 20)	(Jamaica Football Federation) Arnett Gardens FC
