= Eugenio Puga =

Eugenio Puga may refer to:

- Eugenio Puga Fischer (1896–1962), Chilean politician
- Eugenio Pizzuto Puga (born 2002), Mexican footballer
