= 2019 CONCACAF U-17 Championship qualifying =

Tournament details
- Host country: United States
- City: Bradenton, Florida
- Dates: March 16 – April 7, 2019
- Teams: 19 (from 1 confederation)

Tournament statistics
- Matches played: 32
- Goals scored: 107 (3.34 per match)
- Top scorer(s): (Nicaragua) Patrick Huete (4 goals)

The qualifiers of the 2019 CONCACAF U-17 Championship took place between 16–25 March and 1–7 April 2019. All matches were played at the IMG Academy campus in Bradenton, Florida, United States.

== Teams ==
The 41 CONCACAF teams were ranked based on the CONCACAF Men’s Under-17 Ranking as of May 2017. A total of 35 teams entered the tournament. The highest-ranked 16 entrants were exempt from qualifying and advanced directly to the group stage of the final tournament, while the lowest-ranked 19 entrants had to participate in qualifying.

May 2017 rankings

Exempt from qualifying (16 teams)
Rank	Team	Points
1	Mexico	7,311
2	United States	5,632
3	Honduras	5,059
4	Costa Rica	4,848
5	Panama	3,842
6	Canada	3,650
7	Jamaica	3,360
9	Haiti	2,406
10	Trinidad and Tobago	1,970
11	Guatemala	1,909
12	El Salvador	1,517
13	Suriname	1,163
14	Curaçao	1,144
15	Barbados	1,115
17	Bermuda	636
18	Guyana	606

Participating in qualifying (19 teams)
Rank	Team	Points
19	Nicaragua	593
20	Dominican Republic	575
21	Guadeloupe	523
22	Saint Kitts and Nevis	511
23	Antigua and Barbuda	437
24	Puerto Rico	391
25	Bahamas	328
26	Grenada	323
27	Aruba	316
28	Cayman Islands	265
29	Martinique	229
30	Belize	192
31	Anguilla	126
32	U.S. Virgin Islands	121
33	Saint Martin	115
35	Dominica	108
36	Saint Vincent and the Grenadines	86
37	Bonaire	0
39	Montserrat	0

Did not enter (6 teams)
Rank	Team	Points
8	Cuba	2,944
16	Saint Lucia	922
34	British Virgin Islands	111
38	French Guiana	0
40	Sint Maarten	0
41	Turks and Caicos Islands	0

== Draw ==
The draw for the qualifying round took place on 19 February 2019, 11:00 EST (UTC−5), at the CONCACAF Headquarters in Miami. The 19 teams were drawn into four groups: three groups of five teams and one group of four teams. Based on the CONCACAF Men's Under-17 Ranking, the top four ranked teams were seeded into position one of each group, while the remaining 15 teams were distributed in the other pots, as follows:

Pot 1	Pot 2	Pot 3	Pot 4	Pot 5
Nicaragua (A1); Dominican Republic (B1); Guadeloupe (C1); Saint Kitts and Nevis (D1)	Antigua and Barbuda; Puerto Rico; Bahamas; Grenada	Aruba; Cayman Islands; Martinique; Belize	Anguilla; U.S. Virgin Islands; Saint Martin; Dominica	Saint Vincent and the Grenadines; Bonaire; Montserrat

== Qualifying round ==
The winners of each group qualify for the 2019 CONCACAF U-17 Championship, where they enter the round of 16 of the knockout stage.

All times are local, EDT (UTC−4).

=== Group A ===
Pos	Team	Pld	W	D	L	GF	GA	GD	Pts	Qualification
1	Nicaragua	4	3	0	1	12	2	+10	9	2019 CONCACAF U-17 Championship
2	Cayman Islands	4	2	1	1	6	4	+2	7	
3	Saint Vincent and the Grenadines	4	2	1	1	5	3	+2	7	
4	Grenada	4	2	0	2	4	7	−3	6	
5	U.S. Virgin Islands	4	0	0	4	0	11	−11	0	

Source: CONCACAF
Rules for classification: Tie-breakers
16 March 2019
14:30

U.S. Virgin Islands	0–1	Saint Vincent and the Grenadines
	Report	Hunte 76'

IMG Academy Field 1, Bradenton
Referee: Filip Dujic (Canada)
16 March 2019
16:30

Cayman Islands	2–0	Grenada
Bodden 63' (pen.); Watson 84'	Report

IMG Academy Field 1, Bradenton
Referee: Ariel Ameth Sánchez (Panama)

18 March 2019
14:30

U.S. Virgin Islands	0–3	Cayman Islands
	Report	Small 29'; Smith 30'; Sigsworth 57'

IMG Academy Field 1, Bradenton
Referee: Iván Barton (El Salvador)
18 March 2019
16:30

Saint Vincent and the Grenadines	2–0	Nicaragua
Pompey 38', 55' (pen.)	Report

IMG Academy Field 1, Bradenton
Referee: Luis Enrique Santander (Mexico)

20 March 2019
14:30

Saint Vincent and the Grenadines	1–2	Grenada
Hunte 33'	Report	Lawlite 48'; Ettienne 63'

IMG Academy Field 1, Bradenton
Referee: Nikolai Nyron (Trinidad and Tobago)
20 March 2019
16:30

Nicaragua	5–0	U.S. Virgin Islands
Talavera 14'; Huete 30', 75'; Sealey 35' (o.g.); Pérez 36'	Report

IMG Academy Field 1, Bradenton
Referee: Ariel Ameth Sánchez (Panama)

22 March 2019
14:30

Grenada	0–4	Nicaragua
	Report	Vásquez 12'; Huete 50', 82'; Bonilla 56'

IMG Academy Field 1, Bradenton
Referee: Malik Badawi (United States)
22 March 2019
16:30

Cayman Islands	1–1	Saint Vincent and the Grenadines
Smith 61'	Report	Pompey 86' (pen.)

IMG Academy Field 1, Bradenton
Referee: Benbito Celima (Haiti)

24 March 2019
14:30

Nicaragua	3–0	Cayman Islands
Vallecillo 21'; Calderón 25'; Vásquez 66'	Report

IMG Academy Field 1, Bradenton
Referee: Luis Enrique Santander (Mexico)
24 March 2019
16:30

Grenada	2–0	U.S. Virgin Islands
Ettienne 11', 28'	Report

IMG Academy Field 1, Bradenton
Referee: Brayan Cruz (Costa Rica)

=== Group B ===
Pos	Team	Pld	W	D	L	GF	GA	GD	Pts	Qualification
1	Dominican Republic	3	3	0	0	8	1	+7	9	2019 CONCACAF U-17 Championship
2	Antigua and Barbuda	3	2	0	1	9	3	+6	6	
3	Belize	3	0	1	2	3	6	−3	1	
4	Dominica	3	0	1	2	1	11	−10	1	
5	Montserrat	0	0	0	0	0	0	0	0	Withdrew

Source: CONCACAF
Rules for classification: Tie-breakers
1 April 2019
14:30

Belize	1–1	Dominica
Palma 66'	Report	Joseph 76' (pen.)

IMG Academy Field 1, Bradenton
Referee: Cole Shoemaker (Canada)

3 April 2019
14:30

Antigua and Barbuda	2–1	Belize
Davis 11'; D. Hadeed 90+7'	Report	Palma 28' (pen.)

IMG Academy Field 1, Bradenton
Referee: Kwinsi Williams (Trinidad and Tobago)
3 April 2019
16:30

Dominica	0–3	Dominican Republic
	Report	Crispín 13'; I. Báez 30'; Liriano 87'

IMG Academy Field 1, Bradenton
Referee: Tristley Bassue (Saint Kitts and Nevis)

5 April 2019
14:30

Belize	1–3	Dominican Republic
Galvez 50'	Report	J. Báez 15'; Rodríguez 36'; Peralta 62'

IMG Academy Field 1, Bradenton
Referee: Reon Radix (Grenada)
5 April 2019
16:30

Dominica	0–7	Antigua and Barbuda
	Report	Flowers 3', 55'; D. Hadeed 49', 58'; Bishop 51', 72'; C. Hadeed 89'

IMG Academy Field 1, Bradenton

7 April 2019
14:30

Dominican Republic	2–0	Antigua and Barbuda
Rodríguez 46', 56'	Report

IMG Academy Field 1, Bradenton
Referee: Diego Montaño Robles (Mexico)

=== Group C ===
Pos	Team	Pld	W	D	L	GF	GA	GD	Pts	Qualification
1	Guadeloupe	4	4	0	0	15	1	+14	12	2019 CONCACAF U-17 Championship
2	Bonaire	4	2	1	1	5	9	−4	7	
3	Aruba	4	2	0	2	6	4	+2	6	
4	Bahamas	4	1	0	3	4	12	−8	3	
5	Saint Martin	4	0	1	3	1	5	−4	1	

Source: CONCACAF
Rules for classification: Tie-breakers
17 March 2019
14:30

Saint Martin	0–0	Bonaire
	Report

IMG Academy Field 1, Bradenton
Referee: Nikolai Nyron (Trinidad and Tobago)
17 March 2019
16:30

Aruba	3–0	Bahamas
Illes 18', 35', 48'	Report

IMG Academy Field 1, Bradenton
Referee: Melvin Matamoros (Honduras)

19 March 2019
14:30

Saint Martin	1–3	Aruba
Genelus 24'	Report	Tromp 9'; Arends 23'; Ackermans 75'

IMG Academy Field 1, Bradenton
Referee: Benbito Celima (Haiti)
19 March 2019
16:30

Bonaire	0–7	Guadeloupe
	Report	Gedeon 13', 22'; Gille 17'; Mixtur 45', 47'; Dezac 56'; Merabli 87' (pen.)

IMG Academy Field 1, Bradenton
Referee: Malik Badawi (United States)

21 March 2019
14:30

Bonaire	4–2	Bahamas
Rier 11'; Cecilia 26'; Jami. Sint Jago 33'; Jamr. Sint Jago 54'	Report	Lowe 32'; Davis 79'

IMG Academy Field 1, Bradenton
Referee: Melvin Matamoros (Honduras)
21 March 2019
16:30

Guadeloupe	1–0	Saint Martin
Mixtur 64'	Report

IMG Academy Field 1, Bradenton
Referee: Luis Enrique Santander (Mexico)

23 March 2019
14:30

Bahamas	1–5	Guadeloupe
Chisolm 19'	Report	Gravelot 20'; Gille 40'; Molia 44'; Merabli 47'; Confiac 53'

IMG Academy Field 1, Bradenton
Referee: Filip Dujic (Canada)
23 March 2019
16:30

Aruba	0–1	Bonaire
	Report	Benita 10'

IMG Academy Field 1, Bradenton
Referee: Iván Barton (El Salvador)

25 March 2019
14:30

Guadeloupe	2–0	Aruba
Gervelas 9'; Merabli 90+3'	Report

IMG Academy Field 1, Bradenton
Referee: Melvin Matamoros (Honduras)
25 March 2019
16:30

Bahamas	1–0	Saint Martin
Russell 28'	Report

IMG Academy Field 1, Bradenton
Referee: Natalie Simon (United States)

=== Group D ===
Pos	Team	Pld	W	D	L	GF	GA	GD	Pts	Qualification
1	Puerto Rico	3	2	1	0	10	0	+10	7	2019 CONCACAF U-17 Championship
2	Martinique	3	2	0	1	14	2	+12	6	
3	Saint Kitts and Nevis	3	1	1	1	4	1	+3	4	
4	Anguilla	3	0	0	3	0	25	−25	0	

Source: CONCACAF
Rules for classification: Tie-breakers
2 April 2019
14:30

Saint Kitts and Nevis	0–0	Puerto Rico
	Report

IMG Academy Field 1, Bradenton
Referee: Bryan López Castellanos (Guatemala)
2 April 2019
16:30

Martinique	13–0	Anguilla
Gerin 15', 86', 87'; Priam 27', 44'; Labrousse 42'; Feval 56'; Brulu 58'; Nollet 60'; Condoris 71', 88'; Pain 79'; Boutrin 85' (pen.)	Report

IMG Academy Field 1, Bradenton
Referee: José Raul Eduarte (Costa Rica)

4 April 2019
14:30

Puerto Rico	2–0	Martinique
López 27'; Antonetti 47'	Report

IMG Academy Field 1, Bradenton
Referee: Wilson Da Costa (Bahamas)
4 April 2019
16:30

Anguilla	0–4	Saint Kitts and Nevis
	Report	Garnette 3'; Hendricks 60'; Nisbett 66'; Bradshaw 86' (o.g.)

IMG Academy Field 1, Bradenton
Referee: Reinaldo Sequeira (Costa Rica)

6 April 2019
14:30

Martinique	1–0	Saint Kitts and Nevis
Priam 79'	Report

IMG Academy Field 1, Bradenton
Referee: Bryan López Castellanos (Guatemala)
6 April 2019
16:30

Anguilla	0–8	Puerto Rico
	Report	Zayas 3'; Ortíz 26'; Ortega 27', 65'; Rivera 32'; Agosto 58'; Ramos 61', 68'

IMG Academy Field 1, Bradenton
Referee: Melvin Herrera (Honduras)

== Goalscorers ==
There were 107 goals scored in 32 matches, for an average of 3.34 goals per match.

4 goals

- (Nicaragua) Patrick Huete

3 goals

- (Antigua and Barbuda) Dillan Hadeed
- (Aruba) Wesley Illes
- (Dominican Republic) Franklin Rodríguez
- (Grenada) Benjamin Ettienne
- (Guadeloupe) Louis-Alexandre Merabli
- (Guadeloupe) Kenny Mixtur
- (Martinique) Lucas Gerin
- (Martinique) Mathis Priam
- (Saint Vincent and the Grenadines) Jahiem Pompey

2 goals

- (Antigua and Barbuda) D'Andre Bishop
- (Antigua and Barbuda) Ronaldo Flowers
- (Belize) Henry Palma
- (Cayman Islands) Corey Smith
- (Guadeloupe) Thomas Cesaire Gedeon
- (Guadeloupe) Thomas Gille
- (Martinique) Sanders Condoris
- (Nicaragua) Waldner Vásquez
- (Puerto Rico) Agustín Ortega
- (Puerto Rico) Andrés Ramos
- (Saint Vincent and the Grenadines) Javed Hunte

1 goal

- (Antigua and Barbuda) Ratijah Davis
- (Antigua and Barbuda) Conor Hadeed
- (Aruba) Milan Ackermans
- (Aruba) Julian Arends
- (Aruba) Roland Tromp
- (The Bahamas) Terrence Chisolm
- (The Bahamas) Roen Davis
- (The Bahamas) Mason Lowe
- (The Bahamas) Daylan Russell
- (Belize) Wilfredo Galvez
- (Bonaire) Zion Benita
- (Bonaire) Aquino Cecilia
- (Bonaire) Khalil Rier
- (Bonaire) Jamison Sint Jago
- (Bonaire) Jamrick Sint Jago
- (Cayman Islands) Jahrion Bodden
- (Cayman Islands) Jonah Sigsworth
- (Cayman Islands) Joshua Small
- (Cayman Islands) Breshawn Watson
- (Dominica) Tyriq Joseph
- (Dominican Republic) Isaac Báez
- (Dominican Republic) Josué Báez
- (Dominican Republic) Juan Crispín
- (Dominican Republic) Carlos Liriano
- (Dominican Republic) Samuel Peralta
- (Grenada) Aquil Lawlite
- (Guadeloupe) Hiendy Confiac
- (Guadeloupe) Hans Dezac
- (Guadeloupe) Jonael Gervelas
- (Guadeloupe) Youry Gravelot
- (Guadeloupe) Lohan Molia
- (Martinique) Djo Boutrin
- (Martinique) Brice Brulu
- (Martinique) Lionel Feval
- (Martinique) Mathias Labrousse
- (Martinique) Sonny Nollet
- (Martinique) Philippe Pain
- (Nicaragua) Leonardo Bonilla
- (Nicaragua) Josué Calderón
- (Nicaragua) Carlos Pérez
- (Nicaragua) Widman Talavera
- (Nicaragua) Francisco Vallecillo
- (Puerto Rico) Allan Agosto
- (Puerto Rico) Leandro Antonetti
- (Puerto Rico) José López
- (Puerto Rico) Yavieric Ortíz
- (Puerto Rico) José Rivera
- (Puerto Rico) Diego Zayas
- (Saint Kitts and Nevis) Micaah Garnette
- (Saint Kitts and Nevis) Rodgenique Hendricks
- (Saint Kitts and Nevis) Jaheem Nisbett
- (Collectivity of Saint Martin) Woody Genelus

1 own goal

- (Anguilla) Sedu Bradshaw (against Saint Kitts and Nevis)
- (United States Virgin Islands) Kareem Sealey (against Nicaragua)
