= Kenny Mixtur =

Guadeloupean footballer (born 2003)

Personal information
- Full name: Kenny Meddy Mixtur
- Date of birth: 9 October 2003 (age 23)
- Place of birth: Sainte-Anne, Guadeloupe
- Height: 1.85 m (6 ft 1 in)
- Position: Forward

Team information
- Current team: Südtirol
- Number: 25

Youth career
- –2019: Juventus Sainte-Anne
- 2019–2023: Le Havre B

Senior career*
Years	Team	Apps	(Gls)
2022–2023	Le Havre B	22	(11)
2023–2025	Progrès Niederkorn	44	(13)
2025–2026	Villefranche	34	(3)
2026–	Südtirol	9	(2)

International career^{‡}
2024–	Guadeloupe	5	(1)
- * Club domestic league appearances and goals as of 7 November 2026 ‡ National team caps and goals as of 25 June 2025

Kenny Meddy Mixtur (born 9 October 2003) is a Guadeloupean professional footballer who plays as an Forward for Serie B club Südtirol and the Guadeloupe national team.

== Club career ==
As a youth, Mixtur played for Juventus Sainte-Anne in the local Guadeloupe Division of Honour. In 2019, he joined the academy of Le Havre AC in Metropolitan France. He remained with the team through the 2022–23 season in which he scored eleven goals in twenty-two appearances for the club's reserve side in the Championnat National 3. In June 2023, Mixtur joined FC Progrès Niederkorn in Luxembourg's National Division.

Mixtur returned to France in February 2025, joining FC Villefranche Beaujolais of the Championnat National.

On 9 July 2026, he transferred to Serie B club Südtirol on a 3 year contract.

== International career ==
As a youth, Mixture was one of five under-15 youth players selected to travel to France to compete in the Interleagues as a member of the Antilles-Guyana team. He then represented Guadeloupe at the under-17 level, including in 2019 CONCACAF U-17 Championship qualifying. With four goals, he was the nation's top scorer as it qualified for the final tournament and knockout stages for the first time by winning Group C.

Mixtur made his senior international debut on 15 November 2024 in a 2024–25 CONCACAF Nations League Play-in match against the Cayman Islands. He went on to score his first goal for Guadeloupe in the same match, an eventual 6–0 victory.

=== International goals ===
Scores and results list Guadeloupe's goal tally first.

No.	Date	Venue	Opponent	Score	Result	Competition
1.	15 November 2024	Truman Bodden Sports Complex, George Town, Cayman Islands	Cayman Islands	5–0	6–0	2024–25 CONCACAF Nations League Play-in
Last updated 16 June 2025

=== International career statistics ===
As of match played 25 June 2025.

Guadeloupe
Year	Apps	Goals
2024	2	1
2025	3	0
Total	5	1
