= 2020 Copa por México =

Tournament details
- Host country: Mexico
- Dates: 3–19 July
- Teams: 8 (from 1 confederation)
- Venue(s): 2 (in 2 host cities)

Final positions
- Champions: Cruz Azul
- Runners-up: Guadalajara

Tournament statistics
- Matches played: 15
- Goals scored: 35 (2.33 per match)
- Attendance: 0 (0 per match)
- Top scorer(s): José Juan Macías (4 goals)

The 2020 Copa por México (officially Copa GNP por México for sponsorship reasons) was a football preseason club tournament organized by the FMF prior to the 2020–21 Liga MX season that started on 23 July 2020.

The tournament was held in two stadiums in two cities; the Estadio Akron in Zapopan and the Estadio Olímpico Universitario inside Ciudad Universitaria in Mexico City. The tournament featured eight Mexican teams were divided into two groups of four teams.

The tournament started on 3 July 2020 and ended on 19 July 2020. Cruz Azul won the tournament defeating Guadalajara 2–1 in the final.

== Venues ==
2020 Copa por México is located in Mexico
| 2020 Copa por México is located in Mexico | Mexico City | Zapopan |
|---|---|---|
| 2020 Copa por México is located in Mexico | Estadio Olímpico Universitario | Estadio Akron |
| 2020 Copa por México is located in Mexico | Capacity: 58,445 | Capacity: 46,232 |

== Teams ==
A total of 8 teams took part in the competition.

- América
- Atlas
- Cruz Azul
- Guadalajara
- Mazatlán
- Toluca
- UANL
- UNAM

== Format ==
The eight teams were divided into two groups of four teams, each team will play three matches at the group stages with the top two teams from each group progressing to the semi-finals, the winners of the semi-final matches then proceeds to the final.

Estadio Olímpico Universitario hosted all Group A, semi-finals and final matches. Estadio Akron hosted all Group B matches

== Group stage ==
The top two teams from each group advance to the semi-finals.

All times are local, CST (UTC−5).

=== Group A ===
All matches were played at Estadio Olímpico Universitario, Mexico City.

| Pos | Team | Pld | W | D | L | GF | GA | GD | Pts | Qualification |
|---|---|---|---|---|---|---|---|---|---|---|
| 1 | Cruz Azul | 3 | 3 | 0 | 0 | 9 | 2 | +7 | 9 | Advance to knockout stage |
| 2 | América | 3 | 1 | 1 | 1 | 3 | 4 | −1 | 4 | Advance to knockout stage |
| 3 | UNAM (H) | 3 | 0 | 2 | 1 | 1 | 4 | −3 | 2 | |
| 4 | Toluca | 3 | 0 | 1 | 2 | 0 | 3 | −3 | 1 | |

Source: Soccerway
(H) Hosts
3 July 2020
21:55 UTC-05:00

| América | 2–0 | Toluca |
|---|---|---|
| Martín 13'; Sauro 43', og' | Report |

Estadio Olímpico Universitario, Mexico City
Attendance: 0
4 July 2020
19:30 UTC-05:00

| Universidad Nacional | 1–4 | Cruz Azul |
|---|---|---|
| González 3' | Report | Josué Reyes 11', 40'; Hernández 64'; Rodriguez 90' |

Estadio Olímpico Universitario, Mexico City
Attendance: 0

7 July 2020
21:55 UTC-05:00

| Universidad Nacional | 0–0 | América |
|---|---|---|
| | Report |

Estadio Olímpico Universitario, Mexico City
Attendance: 0
8 July 2020
19:00 UTC-05:00

| Cruz Azul | 1–0 | Toluca |
|---|---|---|
| Escobar 45' | Report |

Estadio Olímpico Universitario, Mexico City
Attendance: 0

11 July 2020
21:55 UTC-05:00

| América | 1–4 | Cruz Azul |
|---|---|---|
| Córdova 13' | Report | Viñas 39' (o.g.); Rodríguez 47'; Gutiérrez 52'; Pineda 56' |

Estadio Olímpico Universitario, Mexico City
Attendance: 0
12 July 2020
20:55 UTC-05:00

| Universidad Nacional | 0–0 | Toluca |
|---|---|---|
| | Report |

Estadio Olímpico Universitario, Mexico City
Attendance: 0

=== Group B ===
All matches were played at Estadio Akron, Zapopan.

| Pos | Team | Pld | W | D | L | GF | GA | GD | Pts | Qualification |
|---|---|---|---|---|---|---|---|---|---|---|
| 1 | Guadalajara (H) | 3 | 2 | 0 | 1 | 5 | 3 | +2 | 6 | Advance to knockout stage |
| 2 | UANL | 3 | 1 | 2 | 0 | 4 | 2 | +2 | 5 | Advance to knockout stage |
| 3 | Atlas | 3 | 1 | 1 | 1 | 3 | 4 | −1 | 4 | |
| 4 | Mazatlán | 3 | 0 | 1 | 2 | 1 | 4 | −3 | 1 | |

Updated to match(es) played on 8 July 2020. Source: Soccerway
(H) Hosts
3 July 2020
19:00 UTC-05:00

| Mazatlán | 0–0 | UANL |
|---|---|---|
| | Report |

Estadio Akron, Zapopan
Attendance: 0
4 July 2020
21:55 UTC-05:00

| Guadalajara | 2–0 | Atlas |
|---|---|---|
| José Macías 9'; Jesús Angulo 24' | Report |

Estadio Akron, Zapopan
Attendance: 0
7 July 2020
19:00 UTC-05:00

| Atlas | 1–0 | Mazatlán |
|---|---|---|
| Jesús Gómez 82' | Report |

Estadio Akron, Zapopan
Attendance: 0
8 July 2020
21:55 UTC-05:00

| Guadalajara | 0–2 | UANL |
|---|---|---|
| | Report | André-Pierre Gignac 43', 54' |

Estadio Akron, Zapopan
Attendance: 0
11 July 2020
19:30 UTC-05:00

| Guadalajara | 3–1 | Mazatlán |
|---|---|---|
| Angulo 21'; Macías 46', 79' | Report | Aristeguieta 81' |

Estadio Akron, Zapopan
Attendance: 0
12 July 2020
18:00 UTC-05:00

| Atlas | 2–2 | UANL |
|---|---|---|
| Acosta 24'; Gómez 90+4' | Report | Aquino 31'; Gignac 44' |

Estadio Akron, Zapopan
Attendance: 0

== Knockout stage ==
=== Bracket ===
Semi-finals
15 July — Mexico City
Cruz Azul (p) | 1 (4)
UANL | 1 (3)
16 July — Mexico City
Guadalajara | 4
América | 3

Final
19 July — Mexico City
Cruz Azul | 2
Guadalajara | 1

=== Semi-finals ===
15 July 2020
22:00 UTC-05:00

| Cruz Azul | 1–1 | UANL |
|---|---|---|
| Lichnovsky 90+2' | | Quiñones 35' |
Penalties
| Caraglio (penalty missed); Alexis Gutiérrez (penalty scored); Aldrete (penalty missed); O. Pineda (penalty scored); J. Rodríguez (penalty scored); Domínguez (penalty scored) | 4–3 | (penalty scored) Gignac; (penalty missed) Quiñones; (penalty scored) Dueñas; (penalty scored) Salcedo; (penalty missed) Rafael Carioca; (penalty missed) Pizarro |

Olímpico Universitario, Mexico City
Attendance: 0
16 July 2020
22:00 UTC-05:00

| Guadalajara | 4–3 | América |
|---|---|---|
| Macías 1'; Vega 33'; Zaldívar 81'; Brizuela 84' | | Viñas 35'; Córdova 70'; Ibargüen 88' |

Olímpico Universitario, Mexico City
Attendance: 0

=== Final ===
19 July 2020
21:00 UTC-05:00

| Cruz Azul | 2–1 | Guadalajara |
|---|---|---|
| Mier 53', og'; Rodríguez 90+3' | | Vega 48' |

Olímpico Universitario, Mexico City
Attendance: 0

== Final ranking ==
As per statistical convention in football, matches decided in extra time were counted as wins and losses, while matches decided by a penalty shoot-out were counted as draws.

| Pos | Team | Pld | W | D | L | GF | GA | GD | Pts | Final result |
|---|---|---|---|---|---|---|---|---|---|---|
| 1st place, gold medalist(s) | Cruz Azul | 5 | 4 | 1 | 0 | 12 | 4 | +8 | 13 | Winners |
| 2nd place, silver medalist(s) | Guadalajara (H) | 5 | 3 | 0 | 2 | 10 | 9 | +1 | 9 | Runner-ups |
| 3 | UANL | 4 | 1 | 3 | 0 | 5 | 4 | +1 | 6 | Eliminated in semi-finals |
| 4 | América | 4 | 1 | 1 | 2 | 6 | 8 | −2 | 4 | Eliminated in semi-finals |
| 5 | Atlas | 3 | 1 | 1 | 1 | 3 | 4 | −1 | 4 | Eliminated in group stage |
| 6 | Universidad Nacional (H) | 0 | 0 | 0 | 0 | 0 | 0 | 0 | 0 | Eliminated in group stage |
| 7 | Toluca | 0 | 0 | 0 | 0 | 0 | 0 | 0 | 0 | Eliminated in group stage |
| 8 | Mazatlán | 0 | 0 | 0 | 0 | 0 | 0 | 0 | 0 | Eliminated in group stage |

(H) Hosts

== Broadcasting rights ==
=== Television rights ===
| Country | Broadcaster | | Ref. |
| Country | Free | Pay | Ref. |
|---|---|---|---|
| Mexico | Azteca 7 | | |
| Mexico | Canal 5 ∙ Las Estrellas | TUDN | |
| United States | Univision ∙ UniMás | TUDN | |

=== Radio rights ===
| Territory | Rights holder | Ref. |
|---|---|---|
| United States | TUDN Radio | |
