= D'Andre Bishop =

Antiguan footballer

Personal information
- Full name: D'Andre Jerome Bishop
- Date of birth: 2 October 2002 (age 24)
- Place of birth: Pares, Antigua and Barbuda
- Position: Forward

Team information
- Current team: Belišće

Senior career*
Years	Team	Apps	(Gls)
–2019	Villa Lions		
2019–2021	Ottos Rangers		
2021	1. FC Mönchengladbach	4	(1)
2022–	Belišće	9	(3)

International career^{‡}
2017	Antigua and Barbuda U15		
2019	Antigua and Barbuda U17	3	(2)
2019–	Antigua and Barbuda	15	(3)
- * Club domestic league appearances and goals as of 22:16, 29 October 2022 (UTC) ‡ National team caps and goals as of 23:24, 12 June 2022 (UTC)

D'Andre Jerome Bishop (born 2 October 2002) is an Antiguan footballer who plays as a forward for Croatian third tier club Belišće and the Antigua and Barbuda national team.

== Club career ==
In November 2021, Bishop joined German club 1. FC Mönchengladbach in the fifth-tier Oberliga.

In August 2022, Bishop joined Croatian side NK Belišće in the third-tier Second Football League.

== International career ==
Bishop first played on the international stage at the 2017 CONCACAF Boys' Under-15 Championship in Bradenton, Florida.

He next appeared for the national under-17 team during 2019 CONCACAF U-17 Championship qualifying, notably scoring a brace in their 7–0 victory against Dominica on April 5. However, they finished second in their group after a loss to the Dominican Republic on the final matchday, thus failing to qualify for the finals.

In September 2019, he was first called up to the Antigua and Barbuda senior national team ahead of the 2019–20 CONCACAF Nations League B. He made his debut on September 6, coming on for Carl Osbourne during their 6–0 defeat to Jamaica. He was named in the starting XI in their match against Aruba three days later, where the sixteen-year-old scored in the eighth minute to lead his country to its first ever Nations League victory.

== International statistics ==
As of match played 12 June 2022.

National team	Year	Apps	Goals
Antigua and Barbuda	2019	7	1
Antigua and Barbuda	2020	0	0
Antigua and Barbuda	2021	4	1
Antigua and Barbuda	2022	4	1
Total		15	3

=== International goals ===
Scores and results list Antigua and Barbuda's goal tally first.

No.	Date	Venue	Opponent	Score	Result	Competition
1.	9 September 2019	Sir Vivian Richards Stadium, North Sound, Antigua and Barbuda	Aruba	1–0	2–1	2019–20 CONCACAF Nations League B
2.	24 March 2021	Ergilio Hato Stadium, Willemstad, Curaçao	Montserrat	2–2	2–2	2022 FIFA World Cup qualification
3.	12 June 2022	Estadio Antonio Maceo, Santiago de Cuba, Cuba	Cuba	1–2	1–3	2022–23 CONCACAF Nations League B
