= Jamison Sint Jago =

Dutch association football player

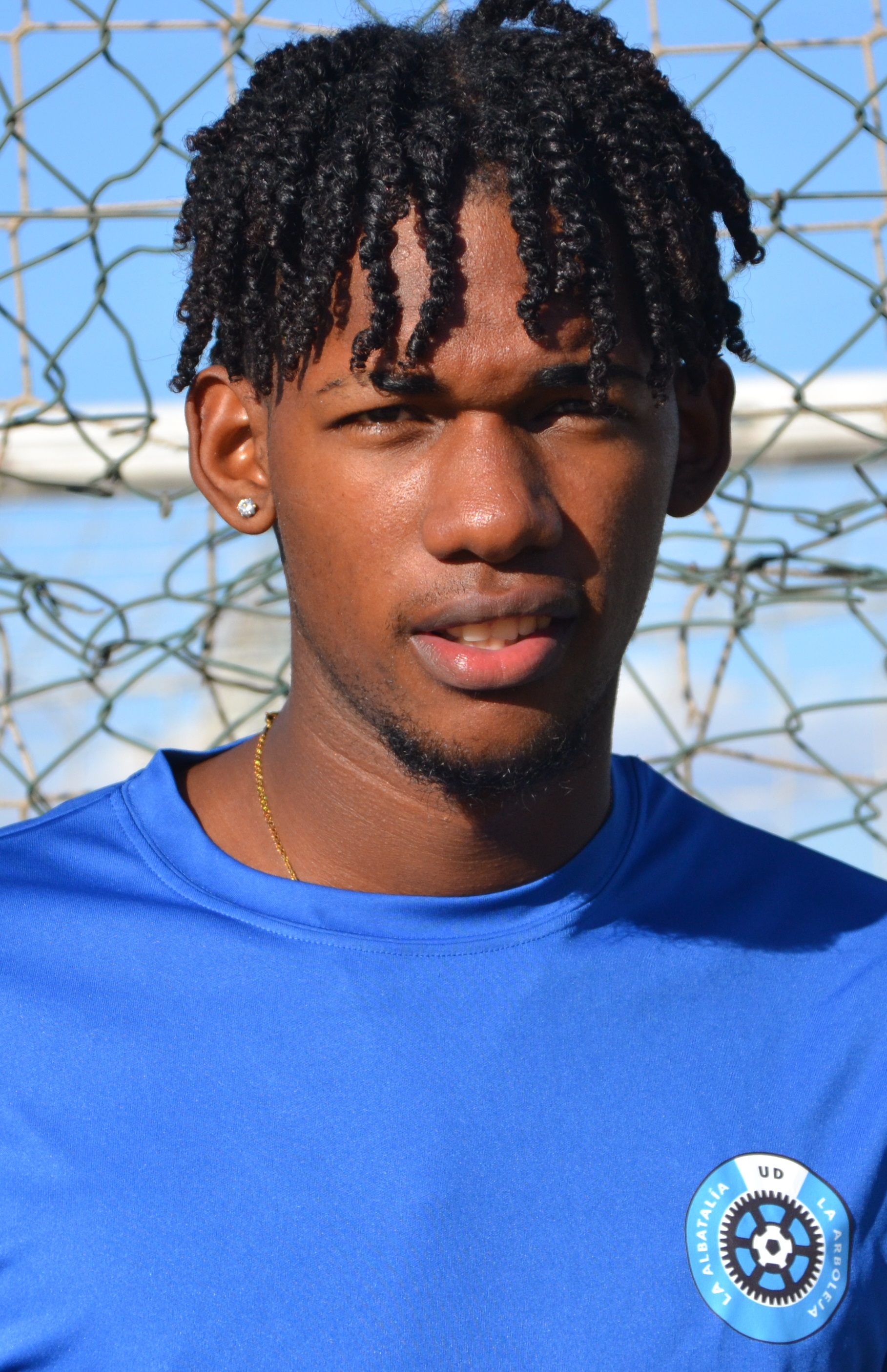
- Sint Jago in 2020

Personal information
- Date of birth: 27 March 2002 (age 24)
- Place of birth: Rincon, Bonaire
- Height: 1.85 m (6 ft 1 in)
- Position: Defender

Team information
- Current team: SV Vespo

Youth career
- 2021: Los Garres

Senior career*
Years	Team	Apps	(Gls)
–2020	Real Rincon		
2020–2021	UD La Albatalía-La Arboleja		
2021–	SV Vespo		

International career^{‡}
2019–	Bonaire	3	(0)
- * Club domestic league appearances and goals as of 16:23, 19 August 2021 (UTC) ‡ National team caps and goals as of 16:23, 19 August 2021 (UTC)

Jamison Sint Jago (born 27 March 2002) is a Bonaire footballer who currently plays for SV Vespo, and the Bonaire national football team.

== Club career ==
Domestically, Sint Jago came up through the ranks of Real Rincon of the Bonaire League. In November 2020 he joined UD La Albatalía-La Arboleja of the Spanish Segunda Autonómica. With the move he became the first player from Bonaire to play in Spain. In January 2021 he moved to UD Los Garres of the same league.

== International career ==
Sint Jago represented Bonaire at the youth level in 2019 CONCACAF U-17 Championship qualifying. He scored in Bonaire's 4–2 victory over the Bahamas.

He made his senior international debut on 6 September 2019 in a 2019–20 CONCACAF Nations League C match against the British Virgin Islands.

=== International statistics ===
As of match played 13 October 2019

Bonaire
Year	Apps	Goals
2019	3	0
Total	3	0
