= 2019 CONCACAF U-17 Championship =

Association football tournament for under-17 national teams

Tournament details
- Host country: United States
- Dates: 1 – 16 May
- Teams: 20 (from 1 confederation)
- Venue: 1 (in 1 host city)

Final positions
- Champions: Mexico (8th title)
- Runners-up: United States

Tournament statistics
- Matches played: 39
- Goals scored: 152 (3.9 per match)
- Top scorer(s): (Costa Rica) Geancarlo Castro (7 goals)
- Best player: (Mexico) Israel Luna
- Best goalkeeper: (Mexico) Eduardo García
- Fair play award: United States

The 2019 CONCACAF U-17 Championship was the 6th edition of the CONCACAF Under-17 Championship (19th edition if all eras included), the men's under-17 international football tournament organized by CONCACAF. It was hosted in the United States between 1 May and 16 May 2019. The top four teams qualified for the 2019 FIFA U-17 World Cup in Brazil as CONCACAF representatives.

Mexico were the defending champions, and won a fourth consecutive title.

== Qualified teams ==
The format for qualification had changed since the 2017 edition. The qualifying competition no longer featured Caribbean and Central American zones.

The 41 CONCACAF teams were ranked based on the CONCACAF Men’s Under-17 Ranking as of May 2017. A total of 35 teams entered the tournament. The sixteen highest-ranked entrants were exempt from qualifying and advanced directly to the group stage of the final tournament, while the lowest-ranked nineteen entrants had to participate in qualifying, where the four group winners advanced to the round of 16 of the knockout stage of the final tournament.

Round	Team	Qualification	Appearance	Previous best performance	Previous FIFA U-17 World Cup appearances
Group stage	Mexico (title holders)	1st ranked entrant	17th	Champions (1985, 1987, 1991, 1996, 2013, 2015, 2017) (Note: Also final group winner in 1999 and 2005.)	13
Group stage	United States (host)	2nd ranked entrant	18th	Champions (1983, 1992, 2011) (Note: Also final group winner in 2001, 2003, 2005 and 2007.)	16
Group stage	Honduras	3rd ranked entrant	18th	Runners-up (2015)	5
Group stage	Costa Rica	4th ranked entrant	17th	Champions (1994) (Note: Also final group winner in 2001 and 2003.)	10
Group stage	Panama	5th ranked entrant	9th	Runners-up (2013)	2
Group stage	Canada	6th ranked entrant	17th	Runners-up (2011)	6
Group stage	Jamaica	7th ranked entrant	14th	Final group winner (1999)	2
Group stage	Haiti	8th ranked entrant	8th	Final group winner (2007)	1
Group stage	Trinidad and Tobago	9th ranked entrant	14th	Runners-up (1983)	2
Group stage	Guatemala	10th ranked entrant	11th	Quarter-finals (2013)	0
Group stage	El Salvador	11th ranked entrant	15th	Fourth place (1999)	0
Group stage	Suriname	12th ranked entrant	2nd	First round (2017)	0
Group stage	Curaçao (Note: Includes five appearances as the Netherlands Antilles before 2010.)	13th ranked entrant	7th	First round (1985, 1991, 1992, 1994, 1996, 2017)	0
Group stage	Barbados	14th ranked entrant	3rd	First round (2011, 2013)	0
Group stage	Bermuda	15th ranked entrant	2nd	First round (1996)	0
Group stage	Guyana	16th ranked entrant	1st	Debut	0
Round of 16	Nicaragua	Qualifying Group A winner	2nd	First round (1994)	0
Round of 16	Dominican Republic	Qualifying Group B winner	3rd	First round (1994, 1996)	0
Round of 16	Guadeloupe	Qualifying Group C winner	1st	Debut	0
Round of 16	Puerto Rico	Qualifying Group D winner	3rd	First round (1983, 1991)	0

== Venues ==
Matches were played at the IMG Academy in Bradenton, Florida:

Bradenton, Florida	Location of the host city of the 2019 CONCACAF U-17 Championship.
IMG Academy	Location of the host city of the 2019 CONCACAF U-17 Championship.
27.4409°N 82.6081°W	Location of the host city of the 2019 CONCACAF U-17 Championship.
Capacity: 5,000	Location of the host city of the 2019 CONCACAF U-17 Championship.

== Match officials ==
Referees

- Marco Antonio Ortiz Nava (Mexico)
- Fernando Guerrero (Mexico)
- Adonai Escobedo (Mexico)
- John Pitti (Panama)
- Iván Barton (El Salvador)
- Ismael Cornejo (El Salvador)
- Henry Bejarano (Costa Rica)
- Juan Gabriel Calderón (Costa Rica)
- Jair Marrufo (United States)
- Armando Villarreal (United States)
- Ismail Elfath (United States)
- Yadel Martinez (Cuba)
- Mario Escobar (Guatemala)
- Walter López Castellanos (Guatemala)
- Oshane Nation (Jamaica)
- Daneon Parchment (Jamaica)
- Kimbell Ward (Saint Kitts and Nevis)
- Hector Saíd Martínez (Honduras)

== Draw ==
The draw for the group stage took place on 19 February 2019, 11:00 EST (UTC−5), at the CONCACAF Headquarters in Miami, Florida, United States. The sixteen teams were drawn into four groups of four teams. Based on the CONCACAF Men's Under-17 Ranking, the top four ranked teams were seeded into position one of each group, while the remaining twelve teams were distributed in the other pots, as follows:

Pot 1	Pot 2	Pot 3	Pot 4
Mexico (E1); United States (F1); Honduras (G1); Costa Rica (H1)	Panama; Canada; Jamaica; Haiti	Trinidad and Tobago; Guatemala; El Salvador; Suriname	Curaçao; Barbados; Bermuda; Guyana

== Squads ==
Players born on or after 1 January 2002 were eligible to compete.

== Group stage ==
The top three teams in each group advanced to the round of 16, where they were joined by the four teams advancing from the qualifying round. The teams were ranked according to points (3 points for a win, 1 point for a draw, 0 points for a loss). If tied on points, tiebreakers were applied in the following order:

1. Greater number of points in matches between the tied teams;
2. Greater goal difference in matches between the tied teams (if more than two teams finished equal on points);
3. Greater number of goals scored in matches among the tied teams (if more than two teams finished equal in points);
4. Greater goal difference in all group matches;
5. Greater number of goals scored in all group matches;
6. Drawing of lots.

All times are local, EDT (UTC−4).

=== Group E ===
Pos	Team	Pld	W	D	L	GF	GA	GD	Pts	Qualification
1	Mexico	3	3	0	0	11	0	+11	9	Round of 16
2	Trinidad and Tobago	3	2	0	1	6	8	−2	6	Round of 16
3	Jamaica	3	1	0	2	6	6	0	3	Round of 16
4	Bermuda	3	0	0	3	3	12	−9	0	

Source: CONCACAF
Rules for classification: Tie-breakers
1 May 2019
16:00

Trinidad and Tobago	3–1	Bermuda
Araujo-Wilson 24', 39'; De Gannes 90'	Report	Dailey 76'

IMG Academy Field 1, Bradenton, Florida
Referee: Henry Bejarano (Costa Rica)
1 May 2019
18:00

Mexico	1–0	Jamaica
Gómez 50'	Report

IMG Academy Field 1, Bradenton, Florida
Referee: Iván Barton (El Salvador)

3 May 2019
16:00

Jamaica	2–3	Trinidad and Tobago
Daley 17'; Scott 90+3'	Report	Sheppard 34', 60'; Araujo-Wilson 44'

IMG Academy Field 1, Bradenton, Florida
Referee: Armando Villarreal (United States)
3 May 2019
18:00

Bermuda	0–5	Mexico
	Report	Álvarez 10'; L. Armas 16'; Muñoz 56'; Luna 82'; Mariscal 87'

IMG Academy Field 1, Bradenton, Florida
Referee: Mario Escobar (Guatemala)

5 May 2019
16:00

Trinidad and Tobago	0–5	Mexico
	Report	González 8'; Muñoz 27', 35', 88'; Álvarez 59'

IMG Academy Field 1, Bradenton, Florida
Referee: Saíd Martínez (Honduras)
5 May 2019
18:00

Bermuda	2–4	Jamaica
Basden 47'; Astwood 64' (pen.)	Report	Mitchell 4'; Wright 9', 15', 51'

IMG Academy Field 1, Bradenton, Florida
Referee: Walter López Castellanos (Guatemala)

=== Group F ===
Pos	Team	Pld	W	D	L	GF	GA	GD	Pts	Qualification
1	United States (H)	3	3	0	0	12	3	+9	9	Round of 16
2	Canada	3	2	0	1	10	5	+5	6	Round of 16
3	Guatemala	3	0	1	2	3	8	−5	1	Round of 16
4	Barbados	3	0	1	2	2	11	−9	1	

Source: CONCACAF
Rules for classification: Tie-breakers
(H) Hosts
2 May 2019
16:00

Guatemala	1–1	Barbados
Gaitán 55'	Report	Gale 90+3'

IMG Academy Field 1, Bradenton, Florida
Referee: John Pitti (Panama)
2 May 2019
18:00

United States	3–2	Canada
Busio 49'; Alejandre 63'; Reyna 69'	Report	Omeonga 21'; Russell-Rowe 22'

IMG Academy Field 1, Bradenton, Florida
Attendance: 350
Referee: Oshane Nation (Jamaica)

4 May 2019
16:00

Barbados	1–6	United States
Richards 54' (pen.)	Report	Hernandez-Foster 20'; Busio 26', 45'; Saldana 33'; Bryan 47' (o.g.); Ocampo-Chavez 50'

IMG Academy Field 1, Bradenton, Florida
Attendance: 215
Referee: Ismael Cornejo (El Salvador)
4 May 2019
18:00

Canada	4–2	Guatemala
Nelson 2', 34', 90'; Habibullah 30'	Report	Palencia 6'; Santis 85'

IMG Academy Field 1, Bradenton, Florida
Referee: Juan Gabriel Calderón (Costa Rica)

6 May 2019
16:00

Barbados	0–4	Canada
	Report	Russell-Rowe 14'; Applewhaite 40' (o.g.); Habibullah 74'; Omeonga 79'

IMG Academy Field 1, Bradenton, Florida
Referee: Henry Bejarano (Costa Rica)
6 May 2019
18:00

Guatemala	0–3	United States
	Report	Yow 25', 51'; Ocampo-Chavez 86'

IMG Academy Field 1, Bradenton, Florida
Attendance: 110
Referee: Yadel Martinez (Cuba)

=== Group G ===
Pos	Team	Pld	W	D	L	GF	GA	GD	Pts	Qualification
1	Haiti	3	3	0	0	12	1	+11	9	Round of 16
2	El Salvador	3	2	0	1	7	5	+2	6	Round of 16
3	Honduras	3	1	0	2	4	4	0	3	Round of 16
4	Guyana	3	0	0	3	0	13	−13	0	

Source: CONCACAF
Rules for classification: Tie-breakers
1 May 2019
10:00

El Salvador	4–0	Guyana
Román 18'; Mauricio 59', 67'; Vásquez 64'	Report

IMG Academy Field 11, Bradenton, Florida
Referee: Yadel Martinez (Cuba)
1 May 2019
16:00

Honduras	0–2	Haiti
	Report	Corlens 11' (pen.); Christophe 45+1'

IMG Academy Field 11, Bradenton, Florida
Referee: Ismail Elfath (United States)

3 May 2019
10:00

Haiti	4–1	El Salvador
Christophe 39'; Jean 70'; Germain 72'; M. Pierre 87'	Report	Mauricio 78'

IMG Academy Field 11, Bradenton, Florida
Referee: Daneon Parchment (Jamaica)
3 May 2019
16:00

Guyana	0–3	Honduras
	Report	Miranda 14', 67'; Carrasco 64'

IMG Academy Field 11, Bradenton, Florida
Referee: Adonai Escobedo (Mexico)

5 May 2019
10:00

Guyana	0–6	Haiti
	Report	M. Pierre 12' (pen.), 28'; Jolicoeur 21'; K. Pierre 27'; Etienne 43'; Rhinvil 82' (pen.)

IMG Academy Field 11, Bradenton, Florida
Referee: Marco Ortiz (Mexico)
5 May 2019
16:00

El Salvador	2–1	Honduras
Mauricio 27'; Román 52'	Report	Medrano 43'

IMG Academy Field 11, Bradenton, Florida
Referee: Fernando Guerrero (Mexico)

=== Group H ===
Pos	Team	Pld	W	D	L	GF	GA	GD	Pts	Qualification
1	Costa Rica	3	2	1	0	11	2	+9	7	Round of 16
2	Panama	3	1	2	0	8	6	+2	5	Round of 16
3	Curaçao	3	0	2	1	4	7	−3	2	Round of 16
4	Suriname	3	0	1	2	2	10	−8	1	

Source: CONCACAF
Rules for classification: Tie-breakers
2 May 2019
10:00

Suriname	1–1	Curaçao
Reumel 14'	Report	Anita 32'

IMG Academy Field 11, Bradenton, Florida
Referee: Marco Ortiz (Mexico)
2 May 2019
16:00

Costa Rica	2–2	Panama
Ugalde 24'; Castro 34' (pen.)	Report	Pinto 32'; Lowis 83'

IMG Academy Field 11, Bradenton, Florida
Referee: Walter López Castellanos (Guatemala)

4 May 2019
10:00

Panama	3–1	Suriname
Carrasquilla 37'; Williams 60'; Rowe 90+3'	Report	Burnet 71'

IMG Academy Field 11, Bradenton, Florida
Referee: Kimbell Ward (Saint Kitts and Nevis)
4 May 2019
16:00

Curaçao	0–3	Costa Rica
	Report	Castro 30' (pen.), 67'; Ugalde 82'

IMG Academy Field 11, Bradenton, Florida
Referee: Iván Barton (El Salvador)

6 May 2019
10:00

Curaçao	3–3	Panama
Bemadina 3'; Anita 43'; Inecia 84'	Report	Castro 21'; Pinto 45+2'; Castillo 49'

IMG Academy Field 11, Bradenton, Florida
Referee: Adonai Escobedo (Mexico)
6 May 2019
16:00

Suriname	0–6	Costa Rica
	Report	Castro 7', 54' (pen.), 68'; Ugalde 44'; Davis 78'; Alvarado 89'

IMG Academy Field 11, Bradenton, Florida
Referee: Jair Marrufo (United States)

== Knockout stage ==
=== Bracket ===
Round of 16
8 May – Bradenton, FL
Mexico	2
Puerto Rico	1
8 May – Bradenton, FL
El Salvador	2
Jamaica	1
8 May – Bradenton, FL
Haiti	2
Dominican Republic	0
8 May – Bradenton, FL
Trinidad and Tobago	1
Honduras	4
9 May – Bradenton, FL
United States	8
Guadeloupe	0
9 May – Bradenton, FL
Panama	2
Guatemala	0
9 May – Bradenton, FL
Costa Rica	2
Nicaragua	1
9 May – Bradenton, FL
Canada	4
Curaçao	0

Quarter-finals
12 May – Bradenton, FL
Mexico	5
El Salvador	1
12 May – Bradenton, FL
Haiti	1 (4)
Honduras	1 (3)
12 May – Bradenton, FL
United States	3
Panama	0
12 May – Bradenton, FL
Costa Rica	1 (3)
Canada	1 (4)

Semi-finals
14 May – Bradenton, FL
Mexico	1
Haiti	0
14 May – Bradenton, FL
United States	4
Canada	0

Final
16 May – Bradenton, FL
Mexico	2
United States	1

=== Round of 16 ===
8 May 2019
10:00

El Salvador	2–1	Jamaica
Vásquez 45'; Flores 70'	Report	Wright 82'

IMG Academy Field 11, Bradenton, Florida
Referee: Mario Escobar (Guatemala)

8 May 2019
15:00

Trinidad and Tobago	1–4	Honduras
Sheppard 57'	Report	Miranda 46', 76', 88'; Aguilera 61'

IMG Academy Field 1, Bradenton, Florida
Referee: John Pitti (Panama)

8 May 2019
16:00

Haiti	2–0	Dominican Republic
Jimenez 28' (o.g.); Christophe 34'	Report

IMG Academy Field 11, Bradenton, Florida
Referee: Oshane Nation (Jamaica)

8 May 2019
18:00

Mexico	2–1	Puerto Rico
Gómez 42'; Luna 68'	Report	J. L. López 7'

IMG Academy Field 1, Bradenton, Florida
Referee: Kimbell Ward (Saint Kitts and Nevis)

9 May 2019
10:00

Panama	2–0	Guatemala
Pinto 72'; Lowis 75'	Report

IMG Academy Field 11, Bradenton, Florida
Referee: Marco Ortiz (Mexico)

9 May 2019
15:00

Canada	4–0	Curaçao
Nava 22' (o.g.); Habibullah 75' (pen.); Colyn 79'; Nelson 85'	Report

IMG Academy Field 1, Bradenton, Florida
Referee: Armando Villarreal (United States)

9 May 2019
16:00

Costa Rica	2–1	Nicaragua
Bolaños 30'; Iglesias 80' (o.g.)	Report	Vallecillo 44'

IMG Academy Field 11, Bradenton, Florida
Referee: Adonai Escobedo (Mexico)

9 May 2019
18:00

United States	8–0	Guadeloupe
Ocampo-Chavez 3', 68'; Yow 11'; Reyna 20', 29', 42' (pen.); Busio 26'; Dezac 70' (o.g.)	Report

IMG Academy Field 1, Bradenton, Florida
Referee: Henry Bejarano (Costa Rica)

=== Quarter-finals ===
The four quarter-final winners qualified for the 2019 FIFA U-17 World Cup.

12 May 2019
10:00

Costa Rica	1–1 (a.e.t.)	Canada
Castro 49' (pen.)	Report	Nelson 45+3' (pen.)
Penalties
Hernández (penalty missed); Davis (penalty scored); Castro (penalty scored); Evans (penalty missed); González (penalty scored)	3–4	(penalty scored) Habibullah; (penalty scored) Catavolo; (penalty missed) Russell-Rowe; (penalty scored) Altobelli; (penalty scored) Facchineri

IMG Academy Field 11, Bradenton, Florida
Referee: Yadel Martínez (Cuba)

12 May 2019
14:00

United States	3–0	Panama
Busio 54'; Reyna 60' (pen.); Pepi 75'	Report

IMG Academy Field 1, Bradenton, Florida
Referee: Daneon Parchment (Jamaica)

12 May 2019
16:00

Haiti	1–1 (a.e.t.)	Honduras
Sainte 65'	Report	Medrano 75'
Penalties
Etienne (penalty missed); Christophe (penalty missed); Pierre (penalty scored); Geffrard (penalty scored); Martin (penalty scored); Jeanty (penalty scored)	4–3	(penalty scored) Vega; (penalty missed) Gómez; (penalty missed) Palacios; (penalty scored) Chávez; (penalty scored) Miranda; (penalty missed) Orellana

IMG Academy Field 11, Bradenton, Florida
Referee: Walter López Castellanos (Guatemala)

12 May 2019
17:00

Mexico	5–1	El Salvador
Luna 9', 48'; González 22'; Rodríguez 41' (o.g.); El-mesmari 79'	Report	Mauricio 58'

IMG Academy Field 1, Bradenton, Florida
Referee: Juan Gabriel Calderón (Costa Rica)

=== Semi-finals ===
14 May 2019
17:30

United States	4–0	Canada
Kayo 47'; Reyna 64'; Pepi 78', 82'	Report

IMG Academy Field 1, Bradenton, Florida
Referee: Ismael Cornejo (El Salvador)

14 May 2019
20:30

Mexico	1–0	Haiti
Álvarez 49'	Report

IMG Academy Field 1, Bradenton, Florida
Referee: Mario Escobar (Guatemala)

=== Final ===
16 May 2019
19:00

Mexico	2–1 (a.e.t.)	United States
Muñoz 17'; Luna 108'	Report	Yow 9'

IMG Academy Field 1, Bradenton, Florida
Attendance: 700
Referee: Daneon Parchment (Jamaica)

== Awards ==
=== Winners ===
2019 CONCACAF U-17 Championship winners

Mexico
8th title

The following awards were given at the conclusion of the tournament.

Golden Ball

- (Mexico) Israel Luna

Golden Boot

- (Costa Rica) Geancarlo Castro (7 goals)

Golden Glove

- (Mexico) Eduardo García

Fair Play

- United States

Best XI
Position	Player
GK	(Mexico) Eduardo García
DF	(Haiti) Jean Geffrard
DF	(United States) Kobe Hernandez-Foster
DF	(Mexico) Alejandro Gómez
DF	(Haiti) Stanley Guirand
MF	(United States) Danny Leyva
MF	(Mexico) Eugenio Pizzuto
MF	(United States) Gianluca Busio
FW	(Costa Rica) Geancarlo Castro
FW	(Mexico) Israel Luna
FW	(United States) Giovanni Reyna

== Goalscorers ==
There were 152 goals scored in 39 matches, for an average of 3.9 goals per match.

7 goals

- (Costa Rica) Geancarlo Castro

6 goals

- (United States) Giovanni Reyna

5 goals

- (Canada) Jayden Nelson
- (El Salvador) Emerson Mauricio
- (Honduras) Jeffry Miranda
- (Mexico) Israel Luna
- (Mexico) Santiago Muñoz
- (United States) Gianluca Busio

4 goals

- (Jamaica) Rajay Wright
- (United States) Alfonso Ocampo-Chavez
- (United States) Griffin Yow

3 goals

- (Canada) Kamron Habibullah
- (Costa Rica) Manfred Ugalde
- (Haiti) Michel Pierre
- (Haiti) Fredler Christophe
- (Mexico) Efraín Álvarez
- (Panama) Éric Pinto
- (Trinidad and Tobago) Justin Araujo-Wilson
- (Trinidad and Tobago) Jaiye Sheppard
- (United States) Ricardo Pepi

2 goals

- (Canada) Jérémie Omeonga
- (Canada) Jacen Russell-Rowe
- (Curaçao) Roshyson Anita
- (Honduras) Héctor Medrano
- (Panama) Aarón Lowis
- (El Salvador) Kevin Román
- (El Salvador) Luis Vásquez
- (Mexico) Alejandro Gómez
- (Mexico) Bryan González

1 goal

- (Barbados) Thierry Gale
- (Barbados) Devonte Richards
- (Bermuda) Arnezha Astwood
- (Bermuda) Jayce Basden
- (Bermuda) Nazuri Dailey
- (Canada) Simon Colyn
- (Costa Rica) Jean Carlo Alvarado
- (Costa Rica) Matthew Bolaños
- (Costa Rica) Keymark Davis
- (Curaçao) Juruel Bemadina
- (Curaçao) Othmar Inecia
- (El Salvador) Jorge Flores
- (Guatemala) Mathius Gaitán
- (Guatemala) Andy Palencia
- (Guatemala) Diego Santis
- (Haiti) Etienne Corlens
- (Haiti) Omre Etienne
- (Haiti) Maudwindo Germain
- (Haiti) Dany Jean
- (Haiti) Kervens Jolicoeur
- (Haiti) Kurowskybob Pierre
- (Haiti) Thero Rhinvil
- (Haiti) Carl Fred Sainte
- (Honduras) Miguel Carrasco
- (Honduras) José Aguilera
- (Jamaica) Cristojaye Daley
- (Jamaica) Revaldo Mitchell
- (Jamaica) Isaac Scott
- (Mexico) Luis Carlos Armas
- (Mexico) Bruce El-mesmari
- (Mexico) Kevin Mariscal
- (Nicaragua) Francisco Vallecillo
- (Panama) Edilson Carrasquilla
- (Panama) Jean Carlos Castillo
- (Panama) Abdiel Castro
- (Panama) Eric Rowe
- (Panama) Reymundo Williams
- (Puerto Rico) José Luis López
- (Suriname) Faisijo Burnet
- (Suriname) Geraldo Reumel
- (Trinidad and Tobago) Andrew De Gannes
- (United States) Axel Alejandre
- (United States) Kobe Hernandez-Foster
- (United States) Adam Saldana
- (United States) Bryang Kayo

1 own goal

- (Barbados) Andre Applewhaite (against Canada)
- (Barbados) Ethan Bryan (against United States)
- (Curaçao) Elijah Nava (against Canada)
- (Dominican Republic) Alejandro Jimenez (against Haiti)
- (El Salvador) Rodrigo Rodríguez (against Mexico)
- (Guadeloupe) Hans Dezac (against United States)
- (Nicaragua) Jeann Francisco Iglesias (against Costa Rica)

== Qualified teams for FIFA U-17 World Cup ==
The following four teams from CONCACAF qualified for the 2019 FIFA U-17 World Cup.

Team	Qualified on	Previous appearances in FIFA U-17 World Cup^{1}
Canada	12 May 2019	6 (1987, 1989, 1993, 1995, 2011, 2013)
United States	12 May 2019	16 (1985, 1987, 1989, 1991, 1993, 1995, 1997, 1999, 2001, 2003, 2005, 2007, 2009, 2011, 2015, 2017)
Mexico	12 May 2019	13 (1985, 1987, 1991, 1993, 1997, 1999, 2003, **2005**, 2009, **2011**, 2013, 2015, 2017)
Haiti	12 May 2019	1 (2007)

^{1} Bold indicates champions for that year. Italic indicates hosts for that year.
