= Bryan González (Mexican footballer) =

Mexican footballer (born 2003)

Personal information
- Full name: Bryan Alonso González Oliván
- Date of birth: 10 April 2003 (age 23)
- Place of birth: Ciudad Juárez, Chihuahua, Mexico
- Height: 1.80 m (5 ft 11 in)
- Position: Left-back

Team information
- Current team: Guadalajara
- Number: 5

Youth career
- Pachuca

Senior career*
Years	Team	Apps	(Gls)
2020–2025	Pachuca	92	(6)
2025–	Guadalajara	50	(8)

International career^{‡}
2019	Mexico U17	13	(3)
2021	Mexico U19	3	(0)
2021–2022	Mexico U20	9	(2)
2023–	Mexico U23	16	(2)
2023–	Mexico	2	(0)
Medal record
Men's football
Representing Mexico
FIFA U-17 World Cup
Runner-up	2019 Brazil	Team
Pan American Games
Bronze medal – third place	2023 Santiago	Team
Central American and Caribbean Games
Gold medal – first place	2023 San Salvador	Team
CONCACAF U-17 Championship
Winner	2019 United States
- * Club domestic league appearances and goals as of 8 November 2026 ‡ National team caps and goals as of 22 January 2026

Bryan Alonso “Cotorro” González Oliván (born 10 April 2003) is a Mexican professional footballer who plays as a left-back for Liga MX club Guadalajara and the Mexico national team.

== Club career ==
González started his career at Pachuca, making his debut for the club in October 2020 during a league match against Tijuana.

On 2 July 2025, González signed with Guadalajara.

== International career ==
=== Youth ===
González was part of the under-17 squad that participated at the 2019 CONCACAF U-17 Championship, scoring two goals, where Mexico won the competition. He also participated at the 2019 U-17 World Cup, where Mexico finished runner-up.

González was called up to the under-20 team by Luis Ernesto Pérez to participate at the 2021 Revelations Cup, appearing in three matches, where Mexico won the competition. In June 2022, he was named into the final 20-man roster for the CONCACAF Under-20 Championship, in which Mexico failed to qualify for the FIFA U-20 World Cup and Olympics.

=== Senior ===
González made his senior national team debut on 16 of December 2023 under Jaime Lozano, in a friendly match against Colombia.

== Career statistics ==
=== Club ===
As of match played on 8 November 2026

Club	Season	League			Cup		Continental (Note: Appearances in CONCACAF Champions Cup)		Intercontinental		Other		Total	
Club	Season	Division	Apps	Goals	Apps	Goals	Apps	Goals	Apps	Goals	Apps	Goals	Apps	Goals
Pachuca	2020–21	Liga MX	6	0	—		—		—		—		6	0
Pachuca	2021–22	Liga MX	21	2	—		—		—		—		21	2
Pachuca	2022–23	Liga MX	9	0	—		—		—		—		9	0
Pachuca	2023–24	Liga MX	23	4	—		7	1	—		1 (Note: Appearances in Leagues Cup)	0	31	5
Pachuca	2024–25	Liga MX	33	0	—		—		6 (Note: Included 3 appearances at the 2024 FIFA Intercontinental Cup and 3 appeareances and a goal at the 2025 FIFA Club World Cup)	1	1	0	40	1
Pachuca	Total		92	6	—		7	1	6	1	2	0	107	8
Guadalajara	2025–26	Liga MX	40	6	—		—		—		3	1	43	7
Guadalajara	2026–27	Liga MX	10	2	—		—		—		3	0	13	2
Guadalajara	Total		50	8	—		—		—		6	1	56	9
Career total			142	14	0	0	7	1	6	1	8	1	163	17

=== International ===
As of match played on 22 January 2026

Appearances and goals by national team and year
National team	Year	Apps	Goals
Mexico	2023	1	0
Mexico	2024	0	0
Mexico	2025	0	0
Mexico	2026	1	0
Total		2	0

== Honours ==
Pachuca

- Liga MX: Apertura 2022
- CONCACAF Champions Cup: 2024

Mexico Youth

- CONCACAF U-17 Championship: 2019
- FIFA U-17 World Cup runner-up: 2019
- Revelations Cup: 2021
- Central American and Caribbean Games: 2023
- Pan American Bronze Medal: 2023

Individual

- CONCACAF Champions Cup Best XI: 2024
- Liga MX All-Star: 2024, 2026
- Liga MX Goal of the Month: September 2025
- Liga MX Best Full-back: 2025–26
