= Ian Lawrence (footballer) =

Costa Rican footballer (born 2002)

Personal information
- Full name: Ian Elijah Lawrence Escoe
- Date of birth: 28 May 2002 (age 24)
- Place of birth: San José, Costa Rica
- Height: 1.79 m (5 ft 10 in)
- Position: Left-back

Team information
- Current team: Sporting
- Number: 28

Youth career
- 2011–2019: Saprissa

Senior career*
Years	Team	Apps	(Gls)
2019–2025	Alajuelense	116	(1)
2020	→ Juventud Escazuceña (loan)		
2025–	Sporting	36	(2)

International career^{‡}
2018–2019	Costa Rica U17	6	(0)
2022–	Costa Rica	5	(0)
- * Club domestic league appearances and goals as of 27 May 2026 ‡ National team caps and goals as of 2 February 2024

Ian Elijah Lawrence Escoe (born 28 May 2002) is a Costa Rican professional footballer who plays as a left-back for Liga FPD club Sporting and the Costa Rica national team.

== Career ==
Lawrence joined Liga Deportiva Alajuelense in 2019. He made his debut for the club on 10 June 2020 against A.D.R. Jicaral. He joined lower league side Escazú FC for the remainder of the 2020 season. He rejoined Alajuelense for the 2021 season. He scored his first goal in October 2021 in a 1–0 victory against Santos de Guapiles. He signed a new contract until 2024 at the end of that year.

== International career ==
Lawrence received his first call up for the senior Costa Rica national football team for matches against the Canadian, El Salvadorian, and American teams. He made his debut on 27 March 2022 as a substitute for Bryan Oviedo against El Salvador. He made his first start a few days later against the US.
