= Bruce El-mesmari =

Mexican footballer (born 2002)

Personal information
- Full name: Bruce El-mesmari Sangochian
- Date of birth: 23 April 2002 (age 24)
- Place of birth: Cancún, Quintana Roo, Mexico
- Height: 1.67 m (5 ft 6 in)
- Position: Winger

Team information
- Current team: Cancún
- Number: 7

Youth career
- 2015–2021: Pachuca
- 2022–2024: América

Senior career*
Years	Team	Apps	(Gls)
2021–2022	Las Vegas Lights	22	(1)
2023–2024	América	2	(0)
2024–2025	Guadalajara	0	(0)
2024–2025	→ Tapatío (loan)	4	(0)
2025	→ Querétaro (loan)	0	(0)
2026–	Cancún	0	(0)

International career^{‡}
2019	Mexico U17	11	(1)
Medal record
Men's football
Representing Mexico
FIFA U-17 World Cup
Runner-up	2019 Brazil	Team
CONCACAF U-17 Championship
Winner	2019 United States
- * Club domestic league appearances and goals as of 20 February 2025 ‡ National team caps and goals as of 28 July 2021

Bruce El-mesmari Sangochian (born 23 April 2002) is a Mexican professional footballer who plays as a winger for Liga de Expansión MX club Cancún.

== Club career ==
=== Pachuca ===
El-mesmari joined the Pachuca youth system when he was aged 13. He went on to earn several trophies at youth level with the club, including an U-15 league championship, U-15 LIGA MX International tournament championship, U-17 league runner-up and U-20 league runner-up.

In June 2021, it was announced that El-mesmari would opt to leave Pachuca following the expiration of his contract. He never made a first team appearance for Pachuca, but appeared on the bench for five Liga MX appearances in 2021.

=== Las Vegas Lights ===
On 9 July 2021, El-mesmari signed with USL Championship club Las Vegas Lights. He made his professional debut on 27 July 2021, appearing as a 64th-minute substitute during a 3–1 win over Orange County SC.

=== América ===
On 15 July 2023, El-mesmari made his professional Liga MX debut with Club América coming in as a late substitute on the 3–0 win against Puebla.

On 29 October 2023, El-mesmari came on in the 71st minute to substitute team captain Henry Martín in a 3–0 win over Monterrey for his second club appearance.

== International career ==
El-mesmari was part of the under-17 squad that participated at the 2019 CONCACAF U-17 Championship, scoring one goal, where Mexico won the competition. He also participated at the 2019 U-17 World Cup, where Mexico finished runner-up.

== Personal life ==
Born in Cancún, Mexico, El-mesmari is of Lebanese and Armenian descent.

== Career statistics ==
=== Club ===
As of 15 July 2023

Club	Season	League			Cup		Continental		Other		Total	
Club	Season	Division	Apps	Goals	Apps	Goals	Apps	Goals	Apps	Goals	Apps	Goals
Las Vegas Lights	2021	USL	17	1	–		–		–		17	1
Las Vegas Lights	2022	USL	5	0	1	0	–		–		6	0
Las Vegas Lights	Total		22	1	1	0	–		–		23	1
América	2023–24	Liga MX	2	0	–		–		–		2	0
Career total			24	1	1	0	0	0	0	0	25	1

== Honours ==
Mexico U17

- CONCACAF U-17 Championship: 2019
- FIFA U-17 World Cup runner-up: 2019
