= Fredler Christophe =

Haitian football player (born 2002)

Personal information
- Date of birth: 11 January 2002 (age 24)
- Place of birth: Léogâne, Haiti
- Height: 1.64 m (5 ft 5 in)
- Position: Midfielder

Youth career
- Exafoot
- Strasbourg

Senior career*
Years	Team	Apps	(Gls)
2020–2023	Strasbourg B	46	(7)
2023–2024	Strasbourg	0	(0)
2023–2024	→ Châteauroux (loan)	7	(0)
2023–2024	→ Châteauroux B (loan)	9	(2)
2024–2025	Épinal	11	(1)
2025–2026	Épinal	0	(0)

International career
2018	Haiti U16	1	(0)
2019	Haiti U17	9	(3)
2018	Haiti U20	3	(0)
2021–2023	Haiti	7	(1)
- * Club domestic league appearances and goals as of 1 July 2026

Fredler Christophe (born 11 January 2002) is a Haitian professional footballer who plays as a midfielder.

== Club career ==
A former youth academy player of Exafoot, Christophe joined French club Strasbourg ahead of the 2019–20 season. On 17 July 2023, he joined Châteauroux on a season long loan deal.

In August 2024, Christophe joined Épinal. After leaving the club in June 2025, he re-joined Épinal in October 2025.

== International career ==
Christophe has represented Haiti at different youth levels. He was captain of Haiti under-17 team at 2019 CONCACAF U-17 Championship and 2019 FIFA U-17 World Cup.

In May 2019, Christophe was named in Haiti's 40-man preliminary squad for 2019 CONCACAF Gold Cup. He made his international debut on 1 September 2021 in a 6–1 friendly match defeat against Bahrain.

== Career statistics ==
=== Club ===
As of 28 August 2022

Appearances and goals by club, season and competition
Club	Season	League			Cup		Continental		Total	
Club	Season	Division	Apps	Goals	Apps	Goals	Apps	Goals	Apps	Goals
Strasbourg B	2019–20	Championnat National 3	1	0	—		—		1	0
Strasbourg B	2020–21	Championnat National 3	0	0	—		—		0	0
Strasbourg B	2021–22	Championnat National 3	22	4	—		—		22	4
Strasbourg B	2022–23	Championnat National 3	1	0	—		—		1	0
Career total			24	4	0	0	0	0	24	4

=== International ===
As of match played 28 March 2023

Appearances and goals by national team and year
National team	Year	Apps	Goals
Haiti	2021	2	0
Haiti	2022	4	1
Haiti	2023	1	0
Total		7	1

Scores and results list Haiti's goal tally first, score column indicates score after each Christophe goal.

List of international goals scored by Fredler Christophe
No.	Date	Venue	Opponent	Score	Result	Competition
1	11 June 2022	Synthetic Track and Field Facility, Leonara, Guyana	Guyana	6–2	6–2	2022–23 CONCACAF Nations League B
