= Eduardo García (Mexican footballer) =

Mexican footballer (born 2002)

Personal information
- Full name: Eduardo García Mendoza
- Date of birth: 11 July 2002 (age 24)
- Place of birth: Guadalajara, Jalisco, Mexico
- Height: 1.83 m (6 ft 0 in)
- Position: Goalkeeper

Team information
- Current team: Tapatío
- Number: 45

Youth career
- 2015–2022: Guadalajara

Senior career*
| Years | Team | Apps | (Gls) |
| 2022– | Tapatío | 85 | (0) |
| 2025– | Guadalajara | 2 | (0) |

International career^{‡}
| 2019 | Mexico U17 | 11 | (0) |
| 2019 | Mexico U18 | 2 | (0) |
| 2022–2023 | Mexico U21 | 3 | (0) |
| 2023–2024 | Mexico U23 | 2 | (0) |
Medal record
Men's football
Representing Mexico
FIFA U-17 World Cup
| Runner-up | 2019 Brazil | Team |
Pan American Games
| Bronze medal – third place | 2023 Santiago | Team |
Central American and Caribbean Games
| Gold medal – first place | 2023 San Salvador | Team |
Toulon Tournament
| Third place | 2022 France | Team |
CONCACAF U-17 Championship
| Winner | 2019 United States |
- * Club domestic league appearances and goals as of 31 October 2026 ‡ National team caps and goals as of 14 June 2024

Eduardo García Mendoza (born 11 July 2002), commonly known as "El Dragón", is a Mexican professional footballer who plays as a goalkeeper for Liga de Expansión MX club Tapatío.

== Club career ==
=== Guadalajara ===
==== Tapatío ====
García made his professional debut with Tapatío on 11 August 2022, in a 1–1 draw against Raya2 Expansión.

==== First team ====
Under head-coach, Óscar García, García made his first team debut on 17 January 2025, in a 2–3 loss against Necaxa.

== International career ==
=== Youth ===
García was part of the under-17 side that participated at the 2019 CONCACAF U-17 Championship, where Mexico won the competition. He also participated at the 2019 U-17 World Cup, where Mexico finished runner-up.

== Honours ==
Tapatío

- Liga de Expansión MX: Clausura 2023, Apertura 2024
- Campeón de Campeones: 2022–23

Mexico Youth

- CONCACAF U-17 Championship: 2019
- FIFA U-17 World Cup runner-up: 2019
- Central American and Caribbean Games: 2023
- Pan American Bronze Medal: 2023

Individual

- CONCACAF U-17 Championship Golden Glove: 2019
- CONCACAF U-17 Championship Best XI: 2019
