= Alejandro Gómez (Mexican footballer) =

Mexican footballer (born 2002)

Personal information
- Full name: Jesús Alejandro Gómez Molina
- Date of birth: 31 January 2002 (age 24)
- Place of birth: Hermosillo, Sonora, Mexico
- Height: 1.83 m (6 ft 0 in)
- Position: Centre-back

Team information
- Current team: Tijuana
- Number: 6

Youth career
- 2015–2019: Atlas

Senior career*
| Years | Team | Apps | (Gls) |
| 2019–2023 | Atlas | 10 | (0) |
| 2020–2021 | → Boavista (loan) | 7 | (0) |
| 2023–2024 | Santos Laguna | 0 | (0) |
| 2024– | Tijuana | 91 | (3) |

International career^{‡}
| 2017 | Mexico U15 | 1 | (0) |
| 2018–2019 | Mexico U17 | 15 | (4) |
| 2023– | Mexico U23 | 6 | (2) |
| 2024– | Mexico | 3 | (0) |
Medal record
Men's football
Representing Mexico
FIFA U-17 World Cup
| Runner-up | 2019 Brazil | Team |
Central American and Caribbean Games
| Gold medal – first place | 2023 San Salvador | Team |
CONCACAF U-17 Championship
| Winner | 2019 United States |
- * Club domestic league appearances and goals as of 20 November 2026 ‡ National team caps and goals as of 30 May 2026

Jesús Alejandro Gómez Molina (Spanish pronunciation: [xeˈsus ˈɣomeθ], born 31 January 2002), also known as Pue, is a Mexican professional footballer who plays as a centre-back for Liga MX club Tijuana and the Mexico national team.

== Club career ==
=== Atlas ===
Gómez made his professional debut on 22 January 2019 with Atlas in the Copa MX group stage match against Leones Negros UdeG, losing 2–1. On 29 March, he made his Liga MX debut against Santos Laguna in a 1–0 victory.

==== Boavista (loan) ====
In August 2020, Gómez joined Portuguese club Boavista in a year-long loan. He made his Primeira Liga debut with the club on 19 September against Nacional, playing as a starter and finishing in a 3–3 draw.

== International career ==
=== Youth ===
Gómez was part of the under-17 side that participated at the 2019 CONCACAF U-17 Championship, where Mexico won the competition. He was included in the Best XI of the tournament. He also participated at the 2019 U-17 World Cup, where Mexico finished runner-up. Gómez was included in the France Football team of the tournament.

=== Senior ===
In September 2020, less than a year following his participation at the U-17 World Cup, Gómez was called up to the senior national team by Gerardo Martino to participate in October friendlies against the Netherlands and Algeria. He did not make any appearance in those matches and his senior debut would not occur until 31 of May 2024 under Jaime Lozano, in a friendly against Bolivia, in which Mexico would take a 1–0 win.

Gómez was in Javier Aguirre's preliminary roster for the 2026 FIFA World Cup but did not make the final list.

== Career statistics ==
=== Club ===
As of match played on 20 November 2026

| Club | Season | League | | | Cup | | Continental | | Other | | Total | |
| Club | Season | Division | Apps | Goals | Apps | Goals | Apps | Goals | Apps | Goals | Apps | Goals |
|---|---|---|---|---|---|---|---|---|---|---|---|---|
| Atlas | 2018–19 | Liga MX | 2 | 0 | 2 | 1 | — | | — | | 4 | 1 |
| Atlas | 2019–20 | Liga MX | 2 | 0 | 4 | 0 | — | | — | | 6 | 0 |
| Atlas | 2020–21 | Liga MX | — | | 3 (Note: Appearances in Copa GNP por México) | 2 | — | | — | | 3 | 2 |
| Atlas | 2022–23 | Liga MX | 6 | 0 | 4 (Note: Appearances in Copa Sky por México) | 0 | 2 (Note: Appearances in CONCACAF Champions League) | 0 | 1 (Note: Appearances in Leagues Cup) | 0 | 13 | 0 |
| Atlas | Total | | 10 | 0 | 13 | 3 | 2 | 0 | 1 | 0 | 26 | 3 |
| Boavista (loan) | 2020–21 | Primeira Liga | 7 | 0 | — | | — | | — | | 7 | 0 |
| Tijuana | 2023–24 | Liga MX | 8 | 0 | — | | — | | — | | 8 | 0 |
| Tijuana | 2024–25 | Liga MX | 31 | 0 | — | | — | | 2 | 0 | 33 | 0 |
| Tijuana | 2025–26 | Liga MX | 36 | 2 | — | | — | | 3 | 0 | 39 | 2 |
| Tijuana | 2026–27 | Liga MX | 16 | 1 | — | | — | | 1 | 0 | 17 | 1 |
| Tijuana | Total | | 91 | 3 | — | | — | | 6 | 0 | 97 | 3 |
| Career total | | | 108 | 3 | 13 | 3 | 2 | 0 | 7 | 0 | 130 | 6 |

=== International ===
As of match played on 30 May 2026

Appearances and goals by national team and year
| National team | Year | Apps | Goals |
|---|---|---|---|
| Mexico | 2024 | 1 | 0 |
| Mexico | 2025 | 0 | 0 |
| Mexico | 2026 | 2 | 0 |
| Total | | 3 | 0 |

== Honours ==
Atlas

- Liga MX: Apertura 2021, Clausura 2022
- Campeón de Campeones: 2022

Mexico Youth

- CONCACAF U-17 Championship: 2019
- FIFA U-17 World Cup runner-up: 2019
- Central American and Caribbean Games: 2023

Individual

- CONCACAF U-17 Championship Best XI: 2019
- France Football FIFA U-17 World Cup Best XI: 2019
