= Eugenio Pizzuto =

Mexican footballer (born 2002)

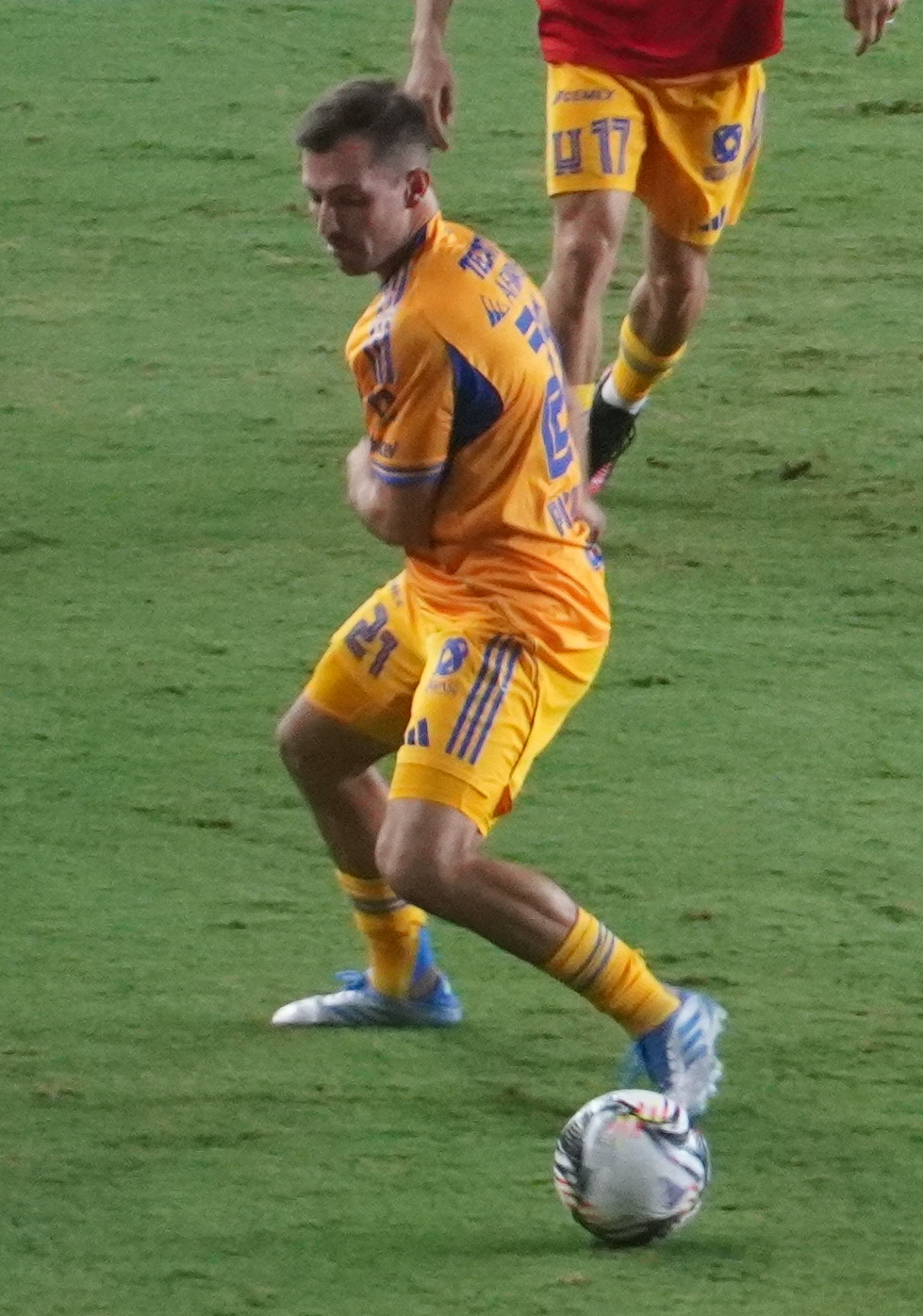
- Pizzuto with Tigres UANL in 2025

Personal information
- Full name: Eugenio Pizzuto Puga
- Date of birth: 13 May 2002 (age 24)
- Place of birth: San Luis Potosí, San Luis Potosí, Mexico
- Height: 1.74 m (5 ft 9 in)
- Position: Midfielder

Team information
- Current team: Atlante (on loan from Tigres UANL)
- Number: 8

Youth career
- 2014–2017: Wellington Phoenix
- 2018–2020: Pachuca
- 2020–2021: Lille

Senior career*
Years	Team	Apps	(Gls)
2020	Pachuca	1	(0)
2020–2022	Lille	0	(0)
2022–2023	Braga B	1	(0)
2023–2025	Tigres UANL	2	(0)
2026–	→ Atlante	25	(2)

International career^{‡}
2018–2019	Mexico U17	15	(2)
2022	Mexico U21	5	(0)
Medal record
Men's football
Representing Mexico
FIFA U-17 World Cup
Runner-up	2019 Brazil	Team
Toulon Tournament
Third place	2022 France	Team
CONCACAF U-17 Championship
Winner	2019 United States	Team
- * Club domestic league appearances and goals as of 20 November 2026 ‡ National team caps and goals as of 12 June 2022

Eugenio Pizzuto Puga (born 13 May 2002) is a Mexican professional footballer who plays as a midfielder for Liga MX club Atlante, on loan from Tigres UANL.

== Club career ==
=== Early career ===
Born in San Luis Potosí, Pizzuto was first spotted at the age of 12 in 2013 by talent identification scout Jess Ibrom of the New Zealand-based Asia-Pacific Football Academy which worked in association with Chelsea FC (now merged with professional side Wellington Phoenix) during open trials in the city of Monclova, Mexico with over 150 players attending from throughout Mexico. Following his performances, Pizzuto was offered a place in the academy along with a scholarship to Scots College in Wellington.

Following his time at Wellington Phoenix - where he was unable to play organised club football due to FIFA laws preventing the international transfer of minors - Pizzuto returned to Mexico and joined the youth ranks of Pachuca in 2018.

On 21 January 2020, Pizzuto made his professional debut during a Copa MX group stage match against Ascenso MX club Venados. Four days later, Pizzuto made his Liga MX debut, coming on as a 59th-minute substitute for Franco Jara in an eventual 3–0 loss against León. However, just nine minutes after coming on, Pizzuto broke his fibula and dislocated his ankle after getting his foot caught on the pitch.

=== Europe ===
On 1 August 2020, Pizzuto joined French side Lille on a free transfer. He debuted for the club's reserve team, Lille II, on 10 October, coming on as a substitute on the 58th minute against US Maubeuge, winning 3–1. He appeared on the bench for the first team for first time as an unused substitute on 22 November in a league match against Lorient, winning 4–0. On 17 January 2022, Pizzuto's contract was terminated by Lille making him a free agent.

On 26 January 2022, Pizzuto joined Braga.

=== Return to Mexico ===
On 14 June 2023, Pizzuto returned to Mexico and joined Tigres UANL as a free agent. He was released in January 2026.

In January 2026, Pizzuto signed with Atlante in the Liga de Expansión MX.

On 16 July, Pizzuto scored in Atlante's first match in the top flight after a 12-year absence, the first in a 2–1 away loss against Necaxa. The following match week, he scored the equalizing goal against América as the score remained at 1–1 at the Estadio Azteca.

== International career ==
=== Youth ===
Pizzuto was part of the under-17 squad that participated at the 2019 CONCACAF U-17 Championship, where Mexico won the competition. He was included in the Best XI of the tournament. Pizzuto was the captain of the team that participated at the 2019 U-17 World Cup. Finishing runner-up against Brazil, he won the Bronze Ball of the tournament. He was included in the France Football team of the tournament.

Pizzuto was called up by Raúl Chabrand to participate with the under-21 team at the 2022 Maurice Revello Tournament, where Mexico finished the tournament in third place.

== Personal life ==
Pizzuto is of Italian descent. His father is from Italy and his mother from Mexico.

== Career statistics ==
=== Club ===
As of match played on 20 November 2026

Appearances and goals by club, season and competition
Club	Season	League			Cup		Continental		Other		Total	
Club	Season	Division	Apps	Goals	Apps	Goals	Apps	Goals	Apps	Goals	Apps	Goals
Pachuca	2019–20	Liga MX	1	0	1	0	—		—		2	0
Braga B	2022–23	Liga 3	1	0	—		—		—		1	0
Tigres UANL	2022–23	Liga MX	—		—		—		1 (Note: Appearance in Campeón de Campeones)	0	1	0
Tigres UANL	2023–24	Liga MX	2	0	—		—		1 (Note: Appearance in Leagues Cup)	0	3	0
Tigres UANL	Total		2	0	—		—		2	0	4	0
Atlante (loan)	2025–26	Liga de Expansión MX	8	0	—		—		—		8	0
Atlante (loan)	2026–27	Liga MX	17	2	—		—		3	0	20	2
Atlante (loan)	Total		25	2	—		—		3	0	28	2
Career total			29	2	1	0	0	0	5	0	35	2

== Honours ==
Lille

- Ligue 1: 2020–21
- Trophée des Champions: 2021

Tigres UANL

- Campeón de Campeones: 2023
- Campeones Cup: 2023

Mexico Youth

- FIFA U-17 World Cup runner-up: 2019
- Toulon Tournament third place: 2022
- CONCACAF U-17 Championship: 2019

Individual

- CONCACAF U-17 Championship Best XI: 2019
- FIFA U-17 World Cup Bronze Ball: 2019
- FIFA U-17 World Cup France Football Best XI: 2019
