= Israel Luna (footballer) =

Mexican footballer (born 2002)

Personal information
- Full name: Israel Luna López
- Date of birth: 23 March 2002 (age 24)
- Place of birth: San Luis Potosí, San Luis Potosí, Mexico
- Height: 1.77 m (5 ft 10 in)
- Position: Attacking midfielder

Team information
- Current team: Pumas UNAM
- Number: 15

Youth career
- 2016–2021: Pachuca

Senior career*
Years	Team	Apps	(Gls)
2022–2026	Pachuca	42	(3)
2026–	Pumas UNAM	7	(0)

International career^{‡}
2019	Mexico U17	15	(7)
Medal record
Men's football
Representing Mexico
FIFA U-17 World Cup
Runner-up	2019 Brazil	Team
CONCACAF U-17 Championship
Winner	2019 United States
- * Club domestic league appearances and goals as of 21 November 2026 ‡ National team caps and goals as of 17 November 2019

Israel Luna López (born 23 March 2002) is a Mexican professional footballer who plays as an attacking midfielder for Liga MX club Pumas UNAM.

== Club career ==
Luna started his youth career with Pachuca, making his debut with the first team on 10 July 2022, in a 2–1 victory against Cruz Azul. On 22 August 2022, he scored his first goal in 1–0 win against León.

On 10 July 2023, in a match against León, Luna suffered an ACL injury on his right knee that kept him out for 6 months. 9 months later, Luna suffered an ACL injury in his left knee, during an U-23 match against Chivas.

== International career ==
=== Youth ===
Luna was part of the under-17 side that participated at the 2019 CONCACAF U-17 Championship, where Mexico won the competition. He was included in the Best XI of the tournament. Luna also participated at the 2019 U-17 World Cup, where Mexico finished runner-up.

== Career statistics ==
=== Club ===
As of match played on 21 November 2026

Club	Season	League			Cup		Continental		Other		Total	
Club	Season	Division	Apps	Goals	Apps	Goals	Apps	Goals	Apps	Goals	Apps	Goals
Pachuca	2022–23	Liga MX	29	3	1 (Note: Appearance in Campeón de Campeones)	1	1 (Note: Appearances in CONCACAF Champions Cup)	0	—		31	4
Pachuca	2023–24	Liga MX	5	0	—		2	0	—		7	0
Pachuca	2024–25	Liga MX	2	0	—		—		—		2	0
Pachuca	2025–26	Liga MX	6	0	—		—		1 (Note: Appearances in Leagues Cup)	0	7	0
Pachuca	Total		42	3	1	1	3	0	1	0	47	4
Pumas UNAM	2026–27	Liga MX	7	0	—		—		—		7	0
Career total			49	3	1	1	3	0	1	0	54	4

== Honours ==
Pachuca

- Liga MX: Apertura 2022
- CONCACAF Champions Cup: 2024

Mexico U17

- CONCACAF U-17 Championship: 2019
- FIFA U-17 World Cup runner-up: 2019

Individual

- CONCACAF U-17 Championship Golden Ball: 2019
- CONCACAF U-17 Championship Best XI: 2019
