= Ronaldo Flowers =

Antigua and Barbudan footballer

Personal information
- Full name: Ronaldo Euroy Flowers
- Date of birth: 9 March 2003 (age 23)
- Position: Midfielder

Youth career
- c. 2018: Brentford CST

Senior career*
Years	Team	Apps	(Gls)
- Aston Villa (St. John's)
2023	PEPO	18	(1)
2024–	Bedfont Sports	5	(1)

International career^{‡}
2019–	Antigua and Barbuda	3	(0)
- * Club domestic league appearances and goals as of 13:15, 9 June 2024 (UTC) ‡ National team caps and goals as of 13:15, 9 June 2024 (UTC)

Ronaldo Flowers (born 9 March 2003) is an Antigua and Barbudan international footballer who plays for the Antigua and Barbuda national football team.

== Career statistics ==
=== International ===
As of matches played 3 June 2021.

Appearances and goals by national team and year
National team	Year	Apps	Goals
Antigua and Barbuda	2019	2	0
Antigua and Barbuda	2021	1	0
Total		3	0
