= Álex Jiménez (footballer, born 2002) =

Dominican Republic footballer

Personal information
- Full name: Alejandro Jiménez García
- Date of birth: 13 January 2002 (age 24)
- Place of birth: Terrassa, Spain
- Height: 1.84 m (6 ft 0 in)
- Position: Centre back

Team information
- Current team: Vilassar de Mar

Youth career
- 2012–2020: Jàbac Terrassa
- 2020–2021: Cornellà

Senior career*
Years	Team	Apps	(Gls)
2021–2022	Cornellà	0	(0)
2021	→ Prat (loan)	2	(0)
2022	→ Sant Andreu (loan)	7	(0)
2022–2023	San Cristóbal	14	(0)
2023–2024	Tona		
2024–	Vilassar de Mar		

International career^{‡}
2019	Dominican Republic U17	1	(0)
2021–	Dominican Republic U23	3	(0)
2021–	Dominican Republic	1	(0)
- * Club domestic league appearances and goals as of 1 May 2022 ‡ National team caps and goals as of 24 March 2021

Alejandro "Álex" Jiménez García (born 13 January 2002) is a professional footballer who plays as a centre back for UE Vilassar de Mar and the Dominican Republic national team. Born in Spain, he represents the Dominican Republic internationally.

== International career ==
Born in Terrassa, Barcelona, Catalonia, Jiménez's mother is Dominican. He first represented the Dominican Republic at under–17 in 2019. He made his senior international debut in 2021.
