= Miguel Carrasco =

Honduran footballer (born 2003)

Personal information
- Full name: Miguel Ángel Carrasco Reyes
- Date of birth: 10 June 2003 (age 23)
- Place of birth: Puerto Cortés, Honduras
- Position: Midfielder

Team information
- Current team: Real España

Senior career*
Years	Team	Apps	(Gls)
2020–	Real España	28	(2)

International career^{‡}
2019	Honduras U17	3	(1)
2022	Honduras U20	4	(1)
- * Club domestic league appearances and goals as of 17:14, 14 June 2020 (UTC) ‡ National team caps and goals as of 05:05, 27 June 2022 (UTC)

Miguel Ángel Carrasco Reyes (born 10 June 2003) is a Honduran footballer currently playing as a midfielder for Real España.

== Career statistics ==
=== Club ===
As of 14 June 2020.

Club	Season	League			Cup		Continental		Other		Total	
Club	Season	Division	Apps	Goals	Apps	Goals	Apps	Goals	Apps	Goals	Apps	Goals
Real España	2019–20	Liga Salva-Vida	2	0	0	0	–		0	0	2	0
Career total			2	0	0	0	0	0	0	0	2	0
