= Jordy Evans =

Costa Rican footballer (born 2002)

Personal information
- Full name: Jordy Jafeth Evans Solano
- Date of birth: 17 April 2002 (age 24)
- Place of birth: Limón, Costa Rica
- Height: 1.78 m (5 ft 10 in)
- Position: Defender

Team information
- Current team: Santos de Guápiles
- Number: 91

Youth career
- –2020: Saprissa

Senior career*
Years	Team	Apps	(Gls)
2020–2023	Saprissa	39	(0)
2022	→ Municipal Grecia (loan)	13	(0)
2023	→ Santos de Guápiles (loan)	31	(2)
2024–	Santos de Guápiles	39	(2)

International career^{‡}
2018–2019	Costa Rica U17	6	(0)
2023	Costa Rica U22	4	(0)
2023	Costa Rica U23	1	(1)
- * Club domestic league appearances and goals as of 19 April 2025 ‡ National team caps and goals as of 17 October 2023

Jordy Jafeth Evans Solano (born 17 April 2002) is a Costa Rican professional footballer who plays as a defender for Santos de Guápiles.

== Career statistics ==
=== Club ===
As of 28 May 2021

Appearances and goals by club, season and competition
Club	Season	League			Cup		Continental		Other		Total	
Club	Season	Division	Apps	Goals	Apps	Goals	Apps	Goals	Apps	Goals	Apps	Goals
Saprissa	2019–20	Liga FPD	1	0	0	0	0	0	0	0	1	0
Saprissa	2020–21	Liga FPD	31	0	0	0	1 (Note: Appearances in the CONCACAF League)	0	0	0	32	0
Career total			32	0	0	0	1	0	0	0	33	0

== Honours ==
=== Club ===
Saprissa

- Liga FPD: Clausura 2021
