= 2007 CONCACAF U17 Tournament qualification =

== Caribbean ==
The Caribbean section was also known as the CFU Youth Cup.

=== First round ===
==== Group A ====
Pos	Team	P	W	D	L	GF	GA	GD	Pts	Qualification
1	Canada	3	3	0	0	19	1	18	9	Second round
2	El Salvador	3	2	0	1	19	3	16	6	
3	Bermuda	3	1	0	2	2	21	-19	3	
4	CFU President's XI	3	0	0	3	0	15	-15	0	

15 August 2006

Canada	10–0	Bermuda

16 August 2006

El Salvador	7–0	CFU President's XI

17 August 2006

Bermuda	1–0	CFU President's XI

17 August 2006

Canada	2–1	El Salvador

19 August 2006

Bermuda	1–11	El Salvador

19 August 2006

Canada	7–0	CFU President's XI

==== Group B ====
Pos	Team	P	W	D	L	GF	GA	GD	Pts	Qualification
1	Panama	3	3	0	0	26	0	26	9	Second round
2	Puerto Rico	3	2	0	1	7	8	-1	6	
3	Saint Lucia	3	1	0	2	3	9	-6	3	
4	Anguilla	3	0	0	3	1	20	-19	0	

15 August 2006

Anguilla	0–5	Puerto Rico

15 August 2006

Panama	6–0	Saint Lucia

17 August 2006

Panama	12–0	Anguilla

17 August 2006

Saint Lucia	0–2	Puerto Rico

19 August 2006

Saint Lucia	3–1	Anguilla

19 August 2006

Panama	8–0	Puerto Rico

==== Group C ====
Pos	Team	P	W	D	L	GF	GA	GD	Pts	Qualification
1	Barbados	3	2	1	0	8	3	5	7	Seoncd Round
2	Suriname	3	2	1	0	8	5	3	7	Seoncd Round
3	Netherlands Antilles	3	1	0	2	6	8	-2	3	
4	Saint Vincent and the Grenadines	3	0	0	3	4	10	-6	0	

15 August 2006

Netherlands Antilles	1–4	Barbados

15 August 2006

Suriname	4–2	Saint Vincent and the Grenadines

17 August 2006

Suriname	3–2	Netherlands Antilles

17 August 2006

Saint Vincent and the Grenadines	1–3	Barbados

19 August 2006

Suriname	1–1	Barbados

19 August 2006

Saint Vincent and the Grenadines	1–3	Netherlands Antilles

==== Group D ====
Pos	Team	P	W	D	L	GF	GA	GD	Pts	Qualification
1	Haiti	2	2	0	0	15	0	15	6	Second round
2	Cayman Islands	2	1	0	1	5	7	-2	0	
2	Saint Martin	2	0	0	2	2	15	-13	0	

15 August 2006

Cayman Islands	0–5	Haiti

17 August 2006

Haiti	10–0	Saint Martin

19 August 2006

Saint Martin	2–5	Cayman Islands

==== Group E ====
Pos	Team	P	W	D	L	GF	GA	GD	Pts	Qualification
1	Trinidad and Tobago	3	3	0	0	16	1	15	9	Second round
2	Guyana	3	2	0	1	5	3	2	6	
3	Grenada	3	0	1	2	1	8	-7	1	
4	Aruba	3	0	1	2	2	12	-10	1	

14 August 2006

Grenada	0–2	Guyana

14 August 2006

Trinidad and Tobago	8–1	Aruba

16 August 2006

Aruba	0–3	Guyana

16 August 2006

Trinidad and Tobago	5–0	Grenada

18 August 2006

Aruba	1–1	Grenada

18 August 2006

Trinidad and Tobago	3–0	Guyana

==== Group F ====
Pos	Team	P	W	D	L	GF	GA	GD	Pts	Qualification
1	Jamaica	3	3	0	0	16	3	13	9	Second round
2	Cuba	3	2	0	1	21	2	19	6	
3	Bahamas	3	1	0	2	6	19	-13	3	
4	Dominica	3	0	0	3	3	22	-19	0	

15 August 2006

Bahamas	4–3	Dominica

15 August 2006

Jamaica	2–1	Cuba

17 August 2006

Cuba	10–0	Dominica

17 August 2006

Jamaica	6–2	Bahamas

19 August 2006

Jamaica	8–0	Dominica

19 August 2006

Cuba	10–0	Bahamas

==== Group G ====
Pos	Team	P	W	D	L	GF	GA	GD	Pts	Qualification
1	Mexico	3	3	0	0	22	0	22	9	Second round
2	Saint Kitts and Nevis	3	2	0	1	5	5	0	6	
3	U.S. Virgin Islands	3	1	0	2	2	16	-14	3	
4	Antigua and Barbuda	3	0	0	3	1	9	-8	0	

15 August 2006

U.S. Virgin Islands	0–2	Saint Kitts and Nevis

15 August 2006

Mexico	4–0	Antigua and Barbuda

17 August 2006

Antigua and Barbuda	0–3	Saint Kitts and Nevis

17 August 2006

Mexico	13–0	U.S. Virgin Islands

19 August 2006

Antigua and Barbuda	1–2	U.S. Virgin Islands

19 August 2006

Mexico	5–0	Saint Kitts and Nevis

=== Second round ===
==== Group A ====
Pos	Team	P	W	D	L	GF	GA	GD	Pts	Qualification
1	Haiti	3	3	0	0	13	1	12	9	Final
2	Trinidad and Tobago	3	1	1	1	5	2	3	4	Third-place match
3	Suriname	3	1	0	2	4	11	-7	3	
4	Barbados	3	0	1	2	1	9	-8	1	

21 August 2006

Haiti	7–1	Suriname

21 August 2006

Trinidad and Tobago	1–1	Barbados

23 August 2006

Barbados	0–5	Haiti

23 August 2006

Suriname	0–4	Trinidad and Tobago

25 August 2006

Suriname	3–0	Barbados

25 August 2006

Trinidad and Tobago	0–1	Haiti

==== Group B ====
Pos	Team	P	W	D	L	GF	GA	GD	Pts	Qualification
1	Mexico	3	3	0	0	6	3	3	9	Final
2	Jamaica	3	1	1	1	5	3	2	4	Third-place match
3	Panama	3	0	2	1	4	5	-1	2	
4	Canada	3	0	1	2	3	7	-4	1	

21 August 2006

Panama	1–2	Mexico

21 August 2006

Canada	0–3	Jamaica

23 August 2006

Jamaica	1–1	Panama

23 August 2006

Mexico	2–1	Canada

25 August 2006

Canada	2–2	Panama

25 August 2006

Mexico	2–1	Jamaica

==== Third-place match ====
27 August 2006

Trinidad and Tobago	2–0	Jamaica

==== Final ====
27 August 2006

Mexico	3–0	Haiti

=== Qualification ===
The finalists Mexico, Haiti and the winner of the third place match Trinidad and Tobago qualified for the 2007 CONCACAF U17 Tournament; Jamaica qualified as hosts.

== Central America ==
Hosted in El Salvador.

- Honduras did not participate as they were host of the final tournament.
- Belize did not participate.

Pos	Team	Pld	W	D	L	GF	GA	GD	Pts	Qualification
1	Costa Rica	4	3	0	1	12	2	+10	9	CONCACAF U17 Tournament
2	El Salvador	4	3	0	1	6	3	+3	9	CONCACAF U17 Tournament
3	Panama	4	2	1	1	5	4	+1	7	
4	Nicaragua	4	0	2	2	3	10	−7	2	
5	Guatemala	4	0	1	3	4	11	−7	1	

14 October 2006

Costa Rica	5–0	Guatemala

14 October 2006

El Salvador	3–0	Nicaragua

16 October 2006

Nicaragua	1–1	Guatemala

16 October 2006

Panama	1–0	Costa Rica

18 October 2006

Nicaragua	1–1	Panama

18 October 2006

Guatemala	1–2	El Salvador

20 October 2006

Costa Rica	5–1	Nicaragua

20 October 2006

Panama	0–1	El Salvador

22 October 2006

Guatemala	2–3	Panama

22 October 2006

El Salvador	0–2	Costa Rica
