= 2003 CONCACAF U-17 Tournament qualification =

The qualification for the 2003 CONCACAF U-17 Tournament took place between August 2002 and January 2003.

== Caribbean Zone ==
=== Preliminary round ===
==== First leg ====
4 August 2002

Dominica	0-2	Guyana

4 August 2002

Dominican Republic	5-0	Puerto Rico

11 August 2002

Saint Vincent and the Grenadines	1-4	Barbados

30 August 2002

U.S. Virgin Islands	0-15	Saint Lucia

8 September 2002

Antigua and Barbuda	2-0	Grenada

20 September 2002

Saint Kitts and Nevis	1-5	Jamaica

==== Second leg ====
18 August 2002

Guyana	1-0	Dominica

18 August 2002

Puerto Rico	3-6	Dominican Republic

25 August 2002

Barbados	1-0	Saint Vincent and the Grenadines

1 September 2002

Saint Lucia	0-0	U.S. Virgin Islands

22 September 2002

Grenada	1-6	Antigua and Barbuda

22 September 2002

Jamaica	2-1	Saint Kitts and Nevis

== First round ==
=== Group A ===
30 October 2002

Guyana	1-1	Trinidad and Tobago

30 October 2002

Bermuda	5-0	Saint Lucia

1 November 2002

Trinidad and Tobago	0-0	Saint Lucia

1 November 2002

Guyana	1-0	Bermuda

3 November 2002

Saint Lucia	3-2	Guyana

3 November 2002

Bermuda	1-1	Trinidad and Tobago

=== Group B ===
Held in knock-out format.

First round
8 Sep Antigua/Barbuda 2-0 Grenada
22 Sep Grenada 1-6 Antigua/Barbuda

20 Sep St Kitts/Nevis 1-5 Jamaica
22 Sep Jamaica 2-1 Saint Kitts/Nevis

Jamaica and Antigua/Barbuda advance.

Second round

6 October 2002

Jamaica	6-1	Antigua and Barbuda

20 October 2002

Antigua and Barbuda	0-1	Jamaica

Jamaica advanced.

=== Group C ===
23 October 2002

Haiti	5-1	Cayman Islands

23 October 2002

Dominican Republic	2-2	Barbados

25 October 2002

Barbados	1-2	Haiti

25 October 2002

Cayman Islands	1-9	Dominican Republic

27 October 2002

Cayman Islands	0-6	Barbados

27 October 2002

Dominican Republic	2-1	Haiti

=== Group D ===
27 October 2002

Bahamas	0-5	Suriname

27 October 2002

Cuba	5-0	Aruba

29 October 2002

Aruba	1-3	Suriname

29 October 2002

Bahamas	0-5	Cuba

31 October 2002

Aruba	2-0	Bahamas

31 October 2002

Suriname	1-2	Cuba

== Second round ==
24 November 2002

Jamaica	4-0	Dominican Republic

8 December 2002

Dominican Republic	0-1	Jamaica

7 December 2002

Bermuda	0-0	Cuba

15 December 2002

Cuba	2-0	Bermuda

== Central American Zone ==
=== Group 1 ===
10 December 2002

El Salvador	5-0	Nicaragua

12 December 2002

Honduras	0-1	El Salvador

14 December 2002

Nicaragua	0-6	Honduras

=== Group 2 ===
15 January 2003

Belize	0-8	Costa Rica

17 January 2003

Panama	4-0	Belize

19 January 2003

Costa Rica	2-2	Panama
