= El Salvador national under-17 football team =

National under-17 association football team representing El Salvador

El Salvador Under-17
- Nickname: La Azulita
- Association: Salvadoran Football Federation (FESFUT)
- Confederation: CONCACAF (North America)
- Head coach: Juan Carlos Serrano
- FIFA code: SLV
First colours	Second colours	Third colours

First international
- El Salvador 1–4 United States (Port of Spain, Trinidad and Tobago; 28 August 1983)

Biggest win
- Bermuda 1–11 El Salvador (Trinidad and Tobago; 18 August 2006)

Biggest defeat
- El Salvador 1–6 United States (San Salvador, El Salvador; 9 May 1999)

FIFA U-17 World Cup
- Appearances: 1 (first in 2025)
- Best result: Group stage

CONCACAF Under-17 Championship
- Appearances: 16 (first in 1983)
- Best result: Fourth place (1999)

The El Salvador national under-17 football team is controlled by Federación Salvadoreña de Fútbol and represents El Salvador in international under-17 or youth football competitions.

== Tournament Records ==
=== FIFA U-17 World Cup ===
Year	Round	GP	W	D	L	GS	GA
(China) 1985	Did not qualify						
(Canada) 1987	Did not qualify						
(Scotland) 1989	Did not qualify						
(Italy) 1991	Did not qualify						
(Japan) 1993	Did not qualify						
(Ecuador) 1995	Did not qualify						
(Egypt) 1997	Did not qualify						
(New Zealand) 1999	Did not qualify						
(Trinidad and Tobago) 2001	Did not qualify						
(Finland) 2003	Did not qualify						
(Peru) 2005	Did not qualify						
(South Korea) 2007	Did not qualify						
(Nigeria) 2009	Did not qualify						
(Mexico) 2011	Did not qualify						
(United Arab Emirates) 2013	Did not qualify						
(Chile) 2015	Did not qualify						
(India) 2017	Did not qualify						
(Brazil) 2019	Did not qualify						
(Indonesia) 2023	Did not qualify						
(Qatar) 2025	Group Stage	3	0	1	2	0	12
(Qatar) 2026	Did not qualify						
Total	1/21	3	0	1	2	0	12

=== UNCAF preliminary round ===
Year	Position	Pld	W	D	L	GF	GA	Result
1999	Qualified as a host							
(Guatemala) 2001	1/5	4	3	1	0	16	4	Qualified
(Honduras) / (Panama) 2003	1/3	2	2	0	0	6	0	Qualified
(Honduras) / (El Salvador) 2005	1/3	2	2	0	0	10	0	Qualified
(El Salvador) 2007	2/5	4	3	0	1	6	3	Qualified
(Panama) / (El Salvador) 2009	3/4	3	1	1	1	8	4	Did not qualify
(Guatemala) / (Costa Rica) 2011	2/3	2	1	0	1	4	4	Qualified
(Guatemala) 2013	4/5	4	1	0	3	8	12	Did not qualify
(Panama) / (Costa Rica) 2015	2/3	2	1	0	1	8	2	Did not qualify
(Costa Rica) 2017	3/5	4	2	0	2	4	6	Qualified
	9/10	27	16	2	9	70	35	

=== CONCACAF U-17 tournament ===
Year	Result	Pld	W	D	L	GF	GA
(Trinidad and Tobago) 1983	Round 1	2	0	0	2	1	8
(Mexico) 1985	Round 1	3	0	1	2	6	9
(Honduras) 1987	Round 1	3	0	1	2	0	3
(Cuba) 1988	Round 1	4	0	1	3	1	6
(Trinidad and Tobago) 1991	Round 1	3	1	0	2	2	8
(Cuba) 1992	Did not enter						
(El Salvador) 1994	Round 1	3	1	1	1	4	5
(Trinidad and Tobago) 1996	Round 1	3	1	1	1	6	4
(El Salvador) (Jamaica) 1999	Fourth Place	5	2	0	3	9	14
(Honduras) (United States) 2001	Round 1	3	1	1	1	4	5
(Canada) (Guatemala) 2003	Round 1	3	0	3	0	4	4
(Costa Rica) (Mexico) 2005	Round 1	3	0	1	2	3	7
(Honduras) (Jamaica) 2007	Round 1	3	0	1	2	2	6
(Mexico) 2009	Did not qualify						
(Jamaica) 2011	Quarter-finals	3	1	0	2	7	6
(Panama) 2013	Did not qualify						
(Honduras) 2015	Did not qualify						
(Panama) 2017	Round 1	3	0	0	3	1	10
(United States) 2019	Quarter-finals	5	3	0	2	10	11
(Guatemala) 2023	Quarter-finals	5	3	0	2	11	10
Total	16/20	54	13	11	30	71	116

From 1983 until 1991, competition was U-16, not U-17.

== Players ==
=== 2026 Squad ===
The following 24 players were called up for the training camp in January 2026.

No.	Pos.	Player	Date of birth (age)	Caps	Goals	Club
	GK	Xavier Ryan				(United States Soccer Federation) Los Angeles Bulls Soccer Club
	GK	Sneijder Salamanca				(United States Soccer Federation) Houston GFI Academy
	GK	Jose Alvarenga				(Salvadoran Football Federation) Inter FA U-17
	GK	Amadeo Figueroa				(United States Soccer Federation) Lamorinda Soccer Club
	DF	Jefferson Perla				(Salvadoran Football Federation) Aguila U-17
	DF	Cristian Martinez				(Salvadoran Football Federation) Alianza U-17
	DF	Roberto Heredia				(United States Soccer Federation) Houston Rangers
	DF	Joao Martinez				(United States Soccer Federation) City SC Carlsbad
	DF	Giovanni Salazar				(United States Soccer Federation) LA Galaxy Academy
	DF	Keylor Rivas				(Salvadoran Football Federation) Turin FC
	DF	Jorge Sanchez				(Salvadoran Football Federation) Academia Exclesior
	DF	Jayden Canales				(United States Soccer Federation) Indy Eleven
	DF	Marcelo Aliaga				(United States Soccer Federation) Springfield Youth Club
	DF	Antonio Alfaro				(United States Soccer Federation) DC United
	MF	Roberto Hernandez				(United States Soccer Federation) LA Galaxy
	MF	Santiago Merlet				(United States Soccer Federation) Houston GFI Academy
	MF	Ruben Andrade				(United States Soccer Federation) HTX ECNL
	MF	Aiden Colocho				(United States Soccer Federation) LA FC Academy
	MF	Jeremy Martinez				(Salvadoran Football Federation) Turin FC
	MF	Franco Herrera				(Salvadoran Football Federation) Hercules U-17
	MF	Jeffrey Ascencio				(Salvadoran Football Federation) Aguila U-17
	MF	Luis Benavides				(Salvadoran Football Federation) Aguila U-17
	MF	Byron Murgos				(Salvadoran Football Federation) FAS U-17
	MF	David Sibrian				(United States Soccer Federation) Atlanta United
	MF	Ronald Torres				(Salvadoran Football Federation) FSF U-17
	MF	Enzo Garay				(United States Soccer Federation) Springfield Youth Club
	MF	Edwin Ortiz				(United States Soccer Federation) DC United
	FW	Mayson Barillas				(United States Soccer Federation) DC United U-17
	FW	Oscar Relgado				(Salvadoran Football Federation) FAS U-17
	FW	Diego Gonzalez				(Salvadoran Football Federation) Alianza U-17
	FW	Andrew Sorto				(United States Soccer Federation) LA FC U-17

=== Recent call-ups ===
The following players have been called up to the El Salvador U-17 squad in the past 12 months.

Pos.	Player	Date of birth (age)	Caps	Goals	Club	Latest call-up

== Personnel ==
=== Current staff ===
As of October 2026

Head coach	(Colombia) Héctor Cárdenas
Assistant coach	(Colombia) Jose Helmer Silva
Physical Coordinator	(Colombia) Pablo Rodas
Physical Therapist	(El Salvador) Chepe Martínez
Medical Trainer	(El Salvador) TBD
Goalkeeper Coach	(El Salvador) Misael Alfaro

== List of coaches ==
- (El Salvador) Jorge Araujo (1990)
- (El Salvador) Cesar Acevedo (1999)
- (El Salvador) Armando Contreras Palma (2001)
- (El Salvador) Remberto Santillana (2002)
- (Argentina) Raúl Cocherari (2004)
- (El Salvador) Norberto Huezo (February 2006 – 2008)
- (Argentina) Mario Rodriguez (January 2008)
- (El Salvador) Victor Manuel Pacheco (November 2010 – December 2011)
- (El Salvador) Jose Luis Rugamas (January 2012 – January 2013)
- (El Salvador) Victor Manuel Pacheco (February 2013 – October 2013)
- (El Salvador) Rafael Tobar (August 2014 – February 2015)
- (El Salvador) Edgar Henríquez (May 2015 – December 2015)
- (El Salvador) Erick Dowson Prado (January 2016 – April 2017)
- (Colombia) Diego Pizarro (September 2017 – December 2017)
- (El Salvador) José de la Cruz (January 2017 - December 2017)
- (El Salvador) Rafael Tobar (January 2018 - November 2018)
- (El Salvador) Ernesto Gochez (December 2018- 2021)
- (El Salvador) Juan Carlos Serrano (July 2022 - November 2025)
- (Colombia) Eduardo Lara (November 2025 - December 2025)
- (Nicaragua) Victor Pastora (January 2026 - July 2026)
- (Colombia) Héctor Cárdenas (August 2026 - Present)

== Record versus other nations ==
Records for competitive matches only. As of 19-02-25

Nat	P	W	D	L	GF	GA	GD
Bermuda	1	1	0	0	11	1	+10
Belize	2	2	0	0	9	1	+8
Canada	7	1	1	5	7	13	-6
Cayman Islands	1	1	0	0	8	0	+8
Colombia	1	0	1	0	0	0	0
Costa Rica	12	0	1	11	10	27	-17
Cuba	3	0	1	2	2	6	-4
Curaçao	1	1	0	0	5	1	+4
Germany	1	0	0	1	0	7	-7
Guatemala	8	5	2	1	14	11	+3
Guyana	1	1	0	0	4	0	+4
Haiti	4	2	0	2	8	7	+1
Honduras	6	2	0	4	6	13	-7
Jamaica	8	3	4	1	10	7	+3
Mexico	6	0	1	5	4	25	-21
Nicaragua	9	9	0	0	41	6	+35
North Korea	1	0	0	1	0	5	-5
Panama	2	2	0	0	4	0	+4
Puerto Rico	1	1	0	0	2	0	+2
Saint Lucia	1	1	0	0	2	0	+2
Suriname	1	1	0	0	4	0	+4
Trinidad and Tobago	5	2	2	1	13	11	+22
United States	9	0	1	8	5	31	-26

== See also ==
- El Salvador national football team
- El Salvador national under-20 football team
- El Salvador national under-21 football team
- El Salvador national under-23 football team
- Federación Salvadoreña de Fútbol
