= 2005 CONCACAF U17 Tournament qualification =

The qualification for the 2005 CONCACAF U-17 Tournament took place between July and December 2004.

== Caribbean Zone ==
=== Preliminary round ===
23 July 2004

| British Virgin Islands | 0–6 | Antigua and Barbuda |

25 July 2004

| Antigua and Barbuda | 8–1 | British Virgin Islands |

=== First round ===
==== Group A ====
18 August 2004

| Barbados | 1–0 | Bahamas |

18 August 2004

| Trinidad and Tobago | 8–1 | Saint Lucia |

20 August 2004

| Saint Lucia | 0–3 | Barbados |

20 August 2004

| Bahamas | 1–14 | Trinidad and Tobago |

22 August 2004

| Saint Lucia | 2–5 | Bahamas |

22 August 2004

| Trinidad and Tobago | 5-0 | Barbados |

==== Group B ====
12 August 2004

| Antigua and Barbuda | 2–2 | Grenada |

12 August 2004

| Jamaica | 4–1 | Dominican Republic |

13 August 2004

| Grenada | 0–2 | Dominican Republic |

13 August 2004

| Antigua and Barbuda | 0–8 | Jamaica |

15 August 2004

| Dominican Republic | 4–0 | Antigua and Barbuda |

15 August 2004

| Jamaica | 2–0 | Grenada |

==== Group C ====
18 August 2004

| Haiti | 4–0 | Suriname |

18 August 2004

| Netherlands Antilles | 2–1 | Aruba |

20 August 2004

| Aruba | 0–2 | Haiti |

20 August 2004

| Suriname | 3–1 | Netherlands Antilles |

22 August 2004

| Aruba | 1–4 | Suriname |

22 August 2004

| Netherlands Antilles | 0–5 | Haiti |

==== Group D ====
11 August 2004

| Saint Vincent and the Grenadines | 1–1 | Bermuda |

11 August 2004

| Cuba | 3–0 | Guyana |

13 August 2004

| Guyana | 1–2 | Bermuda |

13 August 2004

| Saint Vincent and the Grenadines | 0–3 | Cuba |

15 August 2004

| Guyana | 1–2 | Saint Vincent and the Grenadines |

15 August 2004

| Cuba | 3–0 | Bermuda |

=== Second round ===
==== First legs ====
20 November 2004

| Jamaica | 0–4 | Haiti |

26 November 2004

| Cuba | 3–1 | Trinidad and Tobago |

==== Second legs ====
22 November 2004

| Haiti | 0–1 | Jamaica |

10 December 2004

| Trinidad and Tobago | 1–3 | Cuba |

== Central American Zone ==
=== Triangular 1 ===
Hosted in San Salvador, El Salvador.

| Pos | Team | Pld | W | D | L | GF | GA | GD | Pts |
|---|---|---|---|---|---|---|---|---|---|
| 1 | El Salvador | 2 | 2 | 0 | 0 | 10 | 0 | +10 | 6 |
| 2 | Guatemala | 2 | 1 | 0 | 1 | 3 | 1 | +2 | 3 |
| 3 | Nicaragua | 2 | 0 | 0 | 2 | 0 | 12 | −12 | 0 |

Updated to match(es) played on 12 December 2004. Source:
8 December 2004

| Nicaragua | 0–3 | Guatemala |

10 December 2004

| El Salvador | 1–0 | Guatemala |

12 December 2004

| El Salvador | 9–0 | Nicaragua |

=== Triangular 2 ===
Hosted in Tegucigalpa, Honduras

| Pos | Team | Pld | W | D | L | GF | GA | GD | Pts |
|---|---|---|---|---|---|---|---|---|---|
| 1 | Honduras | 2 | 2 | 0 | 0 | 7 | 1 | +6 | 6 |
| 2 | Panama | 2 | 1 | 0 | 1 | 7 | 2 | +5 | 3 |
| 3 | Belize | 2 | 0 | 0 | 2 | 0 | 11 | −11 | 0 |

Updated to match(es) played on 12 December 2004. Source:
8 December 2004

| Honduras | 5–0 | Belize |

10 December 2004

| Panama | 6–0 | Belize |

12 December 2004

| Honduras | 2–1 | Panama |
