= Barbados national under-17 football team =

National association football team of Barbados

Barbados Under-17
- Nickname: Bajan Tridents
- Association: Barbados Football Association
- Confederation: CONCACAF (North America)
- Sub-confederation: CFU (Caribbean)
- Head coach: (Barbados) Marlon Harte
- Captain: Tariq Barker, Reuben Garnes-Alleyne, Kaliq Lashley, Jacob Gollop
- Home stadium: Barbados National Stadium
- FIFA code: BRB
First colours	Second colours

First international
- Saint Lucia 3–1 Barbados (Castries; 18 October 1998)

Biggest win
- Barbados 7-1 Sint Maarten (Port of Spain, Trinidad 5 February 2026)

Biggest defeat
- Canada 8–0 Barbados Barbados (Montego Bay Jamaica; 17 February 2011)

FIFA U-17 World Cup
- Appearances: 0

CONCACAF U-17 Championship
- Appearances: 4 (first in 2011)
- Best result: Group stage (2011, 2013, 2019, 2023)

The Barbados national under-17 football team, nicknamed Bajan Tridents, is the youth national association football team of Barbados and is controlled by the Barbados Football Association. Its represent the country FIFA U-17 World Cup also regional competition CONCACAF U-17 Championship. The team hasn't qualified for the FIFA U-17 World Cup.

== History ==
Since the formation Barbados national under-17 football team have not performed well in international competitions. They have never qualified for the FIFA U-17 World Cup. The team has qualified thrice for the CONCACAF U-17 Championship and never advanced past the group stage.

== Players ==
=== Current squad ===
The following 21 players have been named for the most recent fixtures in the 2026 CONCACAF U-17 World Cup qualification.

No.	Pos.	Player	Date of birth (age)	Club
1	GK	Kaliq Lashley	26 July 2008 (age 18)	
18	GK	Shaquan King	23 June 2010 (age 16)	
21	GK	Kai Roach	10 October 2009 (age 17)	(Barbados Football Association) Kickstart Rush
2	DF	Shakori Scott	1 January 2009 (age 17)	
5	DF	Jacob Gollop	28 December 2009 (age 16)	(United States Soccer Federation) Woodstock Academy
8	DF	Tariq Barker	1 February 2009 (age 17)	
3	DF	Adam King	1 March 2010 (age 16)	(Barbados Football Association) Kickstart Rush
17	DF	Tye Waterman	16 October 2010 (age 16)	(Barbados Football Association) Kickstart Rush
4	DF	Raezario Roach	21 August 2011 (age 15)	
6	MF	Tiago Barrow	2 April 2009 (age 17)	(Barbados Football Association) Paradise
11	MF	Tyrico Bellamy	23 April 2008 (age 18)	(Barbados Football Association) Pinelands United
12	MF	Nicholai Banton	2 March 2009 (age 17)	
13	MF	Ashaun Grecia	6 March 2009 (age 17)	
14	MF	Amari Small	26 August 2010 (age 16)	
15	MF	Keandre Gibson	3 February 2009 (age 17)	
19	MF	Tarrell Nightengale	2 March 2009 (age 17)	
20	MF	Maleek Peters	8 January 2010 (age 16)	
7	MF	Jemari Henry	10 March 2009 (age 17)	
9	MF	Reuben Garnes-Alleyne	8 August 2009 (age 17)	
10	FW	Jamarco Johnson	12 March 2010 (age 16)	(Barbados Football Association) Kickstart Rush
16	FW	Davion Thorne	15 June 2009 (age 17)	

== Fixtures and recent results ==
The following is a list of recent match results, as well as any future matches that have been scheduled.

Win Draw Loss

== Competitive records ==
=== FIFA U-17 World Cup ===
Year	Round	GP	W	D	L	GS	GA	GD
(China) 1985	Did not qualify							
(Canada) 1987	Did not qualify							
(Scotland) 1989	Did not enter							
(Italy) 1991	Withdrew from qualification							
(Japan) 1993	Did not qualify							
(Ecuador) 1995	Disqualified from qualification							
(Egypt) 1997	Did not qualify							
(New Zealand) 1999	Did not qualify							
(Trinidad and Tobago) 2001	Did not qualify							
(Finland) 2003	Did not qualify							
(Peru) 2005	Did not qualify							
(South Korea) 2007	Did not qualify							
(Nigeria) 2009	Did not qualify							
(Mexico) 2011	Did not qualify							
(United Arab Emirates) 2013	Did not qualify							
(Chile) 2015	Did not qualify							
(India) 2017	Did not qualify							
(Brazil) 2019	Did not qualify							
(Indonesia) 2023	Did not qualify							
(Qatar) 2025	To be determined							
Total	0/20	0	0	0	0	0	0	+0

=== CONCACAF U-17 Championship ===
Year	Round	GP	W	D	L	GS	GA	GD
(Trinidad and Tobago) 1983	Did not qualify							
(Mexico) 1985	Did not qualify							
(Honduras) 1987	Did not enter							
(Trinidad and Tobago) 1988	Did not qualify							
(Trinidad and Tobago) 1991	Did not qualify							
(Cuba) 1992	Disqualified							
(El Salvador) 1994	Did not qualify							
(Trinidad and Tobago) 1996	Did not qualify							
(Jamaica) (El Salvador) 1999	Did not qualify							
(Honduras) (United States) 2001	Did not qualify							
(Guatemala) (Canada) 2003	Did not qualify							
(Costa Rica) (Mexico) 2005	Did not qualify							
(Honduras) (Jamaica) 2007	Did not qualify							
(Mexico) 2009	Did not qualify							
(Jamaica) 2011	Group stage	2	0	0	2	1	10	–9
(Panama) 2013	Group stage	2	0	1	1	2	4	–2
(Honduras) 2015	Did not qualify							
(Panama) 2017	Did not qualify							
(United States) 2019	Group stage	3	0	1	2	2	11	–9
(Guatemala) 2023	Group stage	3	0	1	2	1	8	–7
Total	4/20	10	0	3	7	6	33	–27

== See also ==
- Barbados men's national football team
- Football in Barbados
- Sport in Barbados
