= Guyana national under-17 football team =

National association football team

Guyana Under-17
- Nickname: Golden Jaguars
- Association: Guyana Football Federation
- Confederation: CONCACAF (North America)
- Sub-confederation: CFU (Caribbean)
- Head coach: (Guyana) Sampson Gilbert
- Captain: Omari Glasgow
- Home stadium: Providence Stadium
- FIFA code: GUY
First colours	Second colours

First international
- Guyana 2–1 Netherlands Antilles (Georgetown, Guyana; 11 October 1999)

Biggest win
- Guyana 13–0 British Virgin Islands (Couva, Trinidad and Tobago; 26 July 2012)

Biggest defeat
- Guyana 0–6 Haiti (Florida, United States; 5 May 2019)

FIFA U-17 World Cup
- Appearances: 0
- Best result: DNQ

CONCACAF U-17 Championship
- Appearances: 1 (first in 2019)
- Best result: Group stage (2019)

The Guyana national under-17 football team, nicknamed the Golden Jaguars, represents Guyana in international football and is controlled by the Guyana Football Federation. The team compete in the FIFA U-17 World Cup and regional tournament CONCACAF U-17 Championship

== Players ==
The following 21 players were selected for the most recent fixtures in the 2026 CONCACAF U-17 World Cup qualification.

No.	Pos.	Player	Date of birth (age)	Club
1	GK	Zack Brief	19 September 2009 (age 17)	(The Football Association) Fulham
18	GK	Nyall Kendall	29 April 2010 (age 16)	(The Football Association) Charlton
21	GK	Flavio Larose	10 July 2009 (age 17)	(Guyana Football Federation) Pele FC
3	DF	Joshua Morris	28 May 2009 (age 17)	(Canadian Soccer Association) Rush Canada SA
8	DF	Levi Stephen	3 October 2009 (age 17)	
14	DF	Tyrell Walcott	6 January 2009 (age 17)	
16	DF	Trayvon Smith	1 January 2009 (age 17)	
4	DF	Maximus Cato	15 November 2009 (age 16)	
5	DF	Tamer Ünver (captain)	2 April 2009 (age 17)	(United States Soccer Federation) Blau-Weiss Gottschee
2	DF	Malachi Patrick	8 January 2010 (age 16)	
6	MF	Jerimiah Welcome	24 January 2009 (age 17)	(Guyana Football Federation) Milerock
10	MF	Micaiah de Freitas	7 May 2009 (age 17)	(Guyana Football Federation) Defence Force
11	MF	Jaden Nelson	6 April 2010 (age 16)	
13	MF	Darius Chester	26 March 2009 (age 17)	
20	MF	David Williams	1 September 2009 (age 17)	
15	MF	Jaden Tasher	27 August 2010 (age 16)	
12	FW	Nyron Barrow	6 October 2011 (age 15)	
7	FW	Mark Glasgow	9 September 2010 (age 16)	
9	FW	Matthew Stewart	1 July 2009 (age 17)	
17	FW	Aaden Arthur	3 August 2009 (age 17)	
19	FW	Qushon Lewis	3 October 2009 (age 17)	

== Recent results & fixtures ==
The following is a list of match results from the previous 12 months, as well as any future matches that have been scheduled.

Legend

Win Draw Loss Void or Postponed Fixtures

== Competitive records ==
=== FIFA U-17 World Cup ===
Year	Round	GP	W	D	L	GS	GA	GD
(China) 1985	Did not qualify	-	-	-	-	-	-	-
(Canada) 1987	Did not qualify	-	-	-	-	-	-	-
(Scotland) 1989	Did not participate	-	-	-	-	-	-	-
(Italy) 1991	Withdrew	-	-	-	-	-	-	-
(Japan) 1993	Did not qualify	-	-	-	-	-	-	-
(Ecuador) 1995	Disqualified	-	-	-	-	-	-	-
(Egypt) 1997	Did not qualify	-	-	-	-	-	-	-
(New Zealand) 1999	Did not qualify	-	-	-	-	-	-	-
(Trinidad and Tobago) 2001	Did not qualify	-	-	-	-	-	-	-
(Finland) 2003	Did not qualify	-	-	-	-	-	-	-
(Peru) 2005	Did not qualify	-	-	-	-	-	-	-
(South Korea) 2007	Did not qualify	-	-	-	-	-	-	-
(Nigeria) 2009	Did not qualify	-	-	-	-	-	-	-
(Mexico) 2011	Did not qualify	-	-	-	-	-	-	-
(United Arab Emirates) 2013	Did not qualify	-	-	-	-	-	-	-
(Chile) 2015	Did not qualify	-	-	-	-	-	-	-
(India) 2017	Did not qualify	-	-	-	-	-	-	-
(Brazil) 2019	Did not qualify	-	-	-	-	-	-	-
(Peru) 2021	Did not held	-	-	-	-	-	-	-
(Indonesia) 2023	Did not qualify	-	-	-	-	-	-	-
(Qatar) 2025	To be determined							
Total	0/20	0	0	0	0	0	0	+0

=== CONCACAF U-17 Championship ===
Year	Round	GP	W	D	L	GS	GA	GD
(Trinidad and Tobago) 1983	Did not qualify	-	-	-	-	-	-	-
(Mexico) 1985	Did not qualify	-	-	-	-	-	-	-
(Honduras) 1987	Did not participate	-	-	-	-	-	-	-
(Trinidad and Tobago) 1988	Did not qualify	-	-	-	-	-	-	-
(Trinidad and Tobago) 1991	Did not qualify	-	-	-	-	-	-	-
(Cuba) 1992	Disqualified	-	-	-	-	-	-	-
(El Salvador) 1994	Did not qualify	-	-	-	-	-	-	-
(Trinidad and Tobago) 1996	Did not qualify	-	-	-	-	-	-	-
(Jamaica) (El Salvador) 1999	Did not qualify	-	-	-	-	-	-	-
(Honduras) (United States) 2001	Did not qualify	-	-	-	-	-	-	-
(Guatemala) (Canada) 2003	Did not qualify	-	-	-	-	-	-	-
(Costa Rica) (Mexico) 2005	Did not qualify	-	-	-	-	-	-	-
(Honduras) (Jamaica) 2007	Did not qualify	-	-	-	-	-	-	-
(Mexico) 2009	Did not qualify	-	-	-	-	-	-	-
(Jamaica) 2011	Did not qualify	-	-	-	-	-	-	-
(Panama) 2013	Did not qualify	-	-	-	-	-	-	-
(Honduras) 2015	Did not qualify	-	-	-	-	-	-	-
(Panama) 2017	Did not qualify	-	-	-	-	-	-	-
(United States) 2019	Group stage	3	-	-	3	-	13	-12
2020	Did not held	-	-	-	-	-	-	-
Total	1/19	3	0	0	3	-	13	-12
