= Costa Rica national under-17 football team =

Costa Rica under-17
- Nickname(s): Ticos, La Tricolor, La Sele (Selección)
- Association: Federación Costarricense de Fútbol
- Confederation: CONCACAF
- Head coach: Cristian Salomón
- FIFA code: CRC
First colours	Second colours

First international
- Costa Rica 1 – 4 Saudi Arabia (Dammam, Saudi Arabia; February 17, 1985)

Biggest win
- British Virgin Islands 0–26 Costa Rica (Alajuela, Costa Rica; February 7, 2026)

Biggest defeat
- Costa Rica 1 – 4 Turkey (Enugu, Nigeria; October 29, 2009) Records for competitive matches only.

FIFA U-17 World Cup
- Appearances: 12 (first in 1985)
- Best result: Quarter-finals (2001, 2003, 2005, 2015)

CONCACAF Under-17 Championship
- Appearances: 18 (first in 1985)
- Best result: Champions (1994)

The Costa Rica national under-17 football team represents Costa Rica in international football at this age level and is controlled by the Federación Costarricense de Fútbol.

== CONCACAF U-17 Championship record ==
=== CONCACAF U-17 Championship record ===
- 1983: Did not enter
- 1985: Runners-up
- 1987: Third place
- 1988: First stage
- 1991: Did not enter
- 1992: First stage
- 1994: Champions
- 1996: Third place
- 1999: Third place Group A
- 2001: First place Group B
- 2003: First place Group B
- 2005: Second place Group A (won qualifying playoff)•
- 2007: Second place Group B
- 2009: Second place Group B (tournament interrupted)
- 2011: Quarter-finals
- 2013: Group stage
- 2015: Final stage - Won qualifying playoff
- 2017: Classification stage - Second place Group E
- 2019: Quarter-finals
- 2023: Round of 16
- From 1983 until 1991, competition was U-16, not U-17
- In 2009 the tournament was interrupted due to the swine flu, but Costa Rica obtained a spot for the U-17 World Cup.

•Tournaments from 1999 to 2007 followed a two group format. No championship game took place and no standings were given. The top teams in their respective groups qualified and the second placed teams played in a playoff to decide the final seed.

== FIFA U-17 World Cup record ==
=== FIFA U-17 World Cup record ===
Year	Round	GP	W	D*	L	GS	GA
(China) 1985	Group stage	3	0	0	3	1	9
(Canada) 1987	Did not qualify						
(Scotland) 1989	Did not qualify						
(Italy) 1991	Did not qualify						
(Japan) 1993	Did not qualify						
(Ecuador) 1995	Group stage	3	1	0	2	2	5
(Egypt) 1997	Group stage	3	0	0	3	1	6
(New Zealand) 1999	Did not qualify						
(Trinidad and Tobago) 2001	Quarter-finals	4	2	0	2	5	4
(Finland) 2003	Quarter-finals	4	1	1	2	3	5
(Peru) 2005	Quarter-finals	4	1	2	1	5	5
(South Korea) 2007	Round of 16	4	1	1	2	3	4
(Nigeria) 2009	Group stage	3	0	1	2	3	9
(Mexico) 2011	Did not qualify						
(United Arab Emirates) 2013	Did not qualify						
(Chile) 2015	Quarter-finals	5	1	2	2	4	5
(India) 2017	Group stage	3	0	1	2	3	7
(Brazil) 2019	Did not qualify						
(Indonesia) 2023	Did not qualify						
(Qatar) 2025	Group stage	3	0	1	2	2	5
(Qatar) 2026	In progress	1	0	1	0	2	2
Total:12/21	Quarter-finals	37	7	9	21	32	61

* Denotes draws include knockout matches decided on penalty kicks.

== Schedule ==
Win Draw Loss

=== Record versus other nations ===
Nation	Pld	W	D	L	GF	GA	GD	Pts
Argentina	3	0	0	3	0	9	-9	0
Aruba	1	1	0	0	5	0	+5	3
Australia	1	1	0	0	2	0	+2	3
Bahrain	1	0	0	1	1	3	-2	0
Belgium	1	0	0	1	0	1	-1	0
Belize	3	3	0	0	15	1	+14	9
Bermuda	1	1	0	0	8	1	+7	3
Burkina Faso	1	0	0	1	1	4	-3	0
Canada	11	5	3	3	20	14	+6	18
China	1	0	1	0	1	1	0	1
Colombia	1	0	0	1	0	2	-2	0
Cuba	4	3	0	1	9	4	+5	9
Dominican Republic	1	0	0	1	1	2	-1	0
El Salvador	12	11	1	0	27	10	+17	34
France	1	0	1	0	0	0	0	1
Germany	1	0	0	1	1	2	-1	0
Ghana	1	0	1	0	1	1	0	1
Guatemala	5	4	1	0	11	1	+10	13
Guinea	2	1	1	0	4	2	+2	4
Haiti	3	3	0	0	8	2	+6	9
Honduras	8	5	2	1	18	8	+10	17
Iran	2	1	0	1	2	3	-1	3
Italy	1	0	0	1	0	2	-2	0
Jamaica	5	3	0	2	3	3	0	9
Mali	1	0	0	1	0	2	-2	0
Mexico	12	3	2	7	14	27	-13	11
Netherlands Antilles	1	1	0	0	5	0	+5	3
New Zealand	1	0	1	0	1	1	0	1
Nicaragua	6	5	1	0	30	1	+29	16
Nigeria	2	0	1	1	1	4	-3	1
North Korea	1	0	0	1	1	2	-1	0
Panama	6	3	1	2	11	5	+6	10
Paraguay	1	1	0	0	3	0	+3	3
Peru	2	1	0	1	2	1	+1	3
Portugal	1	0	0	1	0	3	-3	0
Russia	1	0	1	0	1	1	0	1
Saint Lucia	1	1	0	0	4	0	+4	3
Saudi Arabia	1	0	0	1	1	4	-3	0
South Africa	1	1	0	0	2	1	+1	3
South Korea	1	1	0	0	2	0	+2	0
Suriname	1	1	0	0	3	0	+3	3
Togo	1	0	1	0	1	1	0	1
Trinidad and Tobago	5	3	1	1	13	2	+11	10
Turkey	1	0	0	1	1	4	-3	0
United States	8	2	2	4	13	14	-1	8
TOTAL	123	65	21	37	244	142	+102	207

== Honours ==
- CONCACAF Under-17 Championship
  - Winners (1): 1994
  - Runners-up (1): 1985

== Current squad ==
The following 20 players were called for the most recent fixtures in the 2026 CONCACAF U-17 World Cup qualification.

No.	Pos.	Player	Date of birth (age)	Club
1	GK	Fabián Araya	24 January 2009 (age 17)	(Costa Rican Football Federation) Alajuelense
13	GK	Sebastián Leiva	2 March 2010 (age 16)	(Costa Rican Football Federation) Cartaginés
18	GK	Joshmark Arias	9 February 2009 (age 17)	(Costa Rican Football Federation) Alajuelense
3	DF	Sleiner Sáenz	10 December 2009 (age 16)	(Costa Rican Football Federation) Alajuelense
15	DF	Sebastián Gómez	21 May 2009 (age 17)	(Costa Rican Football Federation) Sporting F.C.
17	DF	Paul Jiménez	3 March 2009 (age 17)	(Costa Rican Football Federation) Sporting F.C.
2	DF	Brayan Calderón	28 February 2009 (age 17)	(Costa Rican Football Federation) Alajuelense
16	DF	Ian Badilla	9 April 2009 (age 17)	(Costa Rican Football Federation) FC Moravia FCM
4	DF	Adrián Espinoza	28 April 2009 (age 17)	(Costa Rican Football Federation) Alajuelense
5	MF	Yordi Alfaro	14 August 2010 (age 16)	(Costa Rican Football Federation) Alajuelense
6	MF	Santiago Quirós	16 November 2009 (age 17)	(Costa Rican Football Federation) Cartaginés
8	MF	Marshal Araya	26 June 2009 (age 17)	(Costa Rican Football Federation) Alajuelense
12	MF	Keylord Madrigal	30 January 2009 (age 17)	(Costa Rican Football Federation) Herediano
14	MF	Johan Quesada	28 June 2009 (age 17)	(Costa Rican Football Federation) Alajuelense
10	MF	Jorshuad Pilarte (captain)	10 October 2009 (age 17)	(Costa Rican Football Federation) San Carlos
11	FW	Paul González	6 June 2009 (age 17)	(Costa Rican Football Federation) Liberia
21	FW	Kyan McDonald	31 May 2010 (age 16)	(Costa Rican Football Federation) Alajuelense
7	FW	Akenai Samuels	5 February 2009 (age 17)	(Costa Rican Football Federation) Alajuelense
9	FW	Ethan Barley	18 April 2009 (age 17)	(Costa Rican Football Federation) Alajuelense
20	FW	Jefrey Urbina	20 March 2010 (age 16)	(Costa Rican Football Federation) FC Moravia FCM

== See also ==
- Costa Rica national football team
- Costa Rica national under-23 football team
- Costa Rica national under-20 football team
- Costa Rica at the FIFA World Cup
