= 2008 CFU Youth Cup =

Football Tournament

The 2008 Caribbean Football Union Youth Cup was played from July 31 - August 10 in Trinidad & Tobago. It was part of the 2009 CONCACAF U-17 Championship qualification. Cuba beat Trinidad and Tobago in the final, thus both qualified for the 2009 CONCACAF U-17 Championship.

== Format ==
Group(s)	# of teams	Teams advancing
A, E	4	Top 2 teams
C, D, F	3	Winner advances, best 2nd place team goes to playoff
B	2	Winner goes to playoff

== Groups ==
=== Group A ===
Pos	Team	P	W	D	L	GF	GA	GD	Pts	Qualification
1	Cuba	3	3	0	0	24	0	24	9	Knockout Stage
2	Saint Vincent and the Grenadines	3	2	0	1	7	12	-5	6	Knockout Stage
3	Dominica	3	1	0	2	3	10	-7	3	
4	Turks and Caicos Islands	3	0	0	3	1	13	-12	0	

Saint Vincent and the Grenadines	4–1	Turks and Caicos Islands
Cuba	7–0	Dominica
Cuba	7–0	Turks and Caicos Islands
Saint Vincent and the Grenadines	3–1	Dominica
Turks and Caicos Islands	0–2	Dominica
Saint Vincent and the Grenadines	0–10	Cuba

=== Group B ===
Pos	Team	P	W	D	L	GF	GA	GD	Pts	Qualification
1	Guyana	2	1	1	0	1	0	1	4	Playoff
2	Barbados	2	0	1	1	0	1	-1	1	

Barbados	0–0	Guyana
Guyana	1–0 (aet)	Barbados

=== Group C ===
Pos	Team	P	W	D	L	GF	GA	GD	Pts	Qualification
1	Haiti	2	2	0	0	6	0	6	6	Knockout Stage
2	Saint Kitts and Nevis	2	1	0	1	2	2	0	3	
3	Cayman Islands	2	0	0	2	0	6	-6	0	

Haiti	2–0	Saint Kitts and Nevis
Haiti	4–0	Cayman Islands
Cayman Islands	0–2	Saint Kitts and Nevis

=== Group D ===
Pos	Team	P	W	D	L	GF	GA	GD	Pts	Qualification
1	Trinidad and Tobago	2	1	1	0	10	1	9	4	Knockout Stage
2	Bermuda	2	1	1	0	7	1	6	4	Playoff
3	Aruba	2	0	0	2	0	15	-15	0	

Trinidad and Tobago	1–1	Bermuda
Bermuda	6–0	Aruba
Trinidad and Tobago	9–0	Aruba

=== Group E ===
Pos	Team	P	W	D	L	GF	GA	GD	Pts	Qualification
1	Jamaica	3	3	0	0	12	1	11	9	Knockout Stage
2	Dominican Republic	3	1	1	1	3	3	0	4	Knockout Stage
3	Antigua and Barbuda	3	0	2	1	4	8	-4	2	
4	Netherlands Antilles	3	0	1	2	3	10	-7	1	

Dominican Republic	2–1	Netherlands Antilles
Jamaica	5–1	Antigua and Barbuda
Antigua and Barbuda	1–1	Dominican Republic
Netherlands Antilles	0–6	Jamaica
Netherlands Antilles	2–2	Antigua and Barbuda
Jamaica	1–0	Dominican Republic

=== Group F ===
Pos	Team	P	W	D	L	GF	GA	GD	Pts	Qualification
1	Guadeloupe	2	2	0	0	16	1	15	6	Knockout Stage
2	Suriname	2	1	0	1	9	6	3	3	
3	U.S. Virgin Islands	2	0	0	2	1	19	-18	0	

Suriname	9–0	U.S. Virgin Islands
Guadeloupe	10–1	U.S. Virgin Islands
Suriname	0–6	Guadeloupe

=== Playoff ===
Bermuda won the play-off after penalties and advanced to the knockout-round.

5 August 2008
15:45 UTC−02:00

Guyana	1–1	Bermuda
	Report
Penalties
	5–6

== Knockout stage ==
Quarter-finals
6 August - Pointe-pierre
Cuba	2
Bermuda	1
6 August - Pointe-pierre
Saint Vincent and the Grenadines	0
Haiti	6
6 August - Macoya
Guadeloupe	1
Jamaica	3
6 August - Macoya
Trinidad and Tobago	3
Dominican Republic	0

Semi-finals
8 August – Macoya
Cuba	1 (5)
Haiti	1 (4)
8 August - Macoya
Trinidad and Tobago	3 a.e.t
Jamaica	1

Final
10 August – Macoya
Trinidad and Tobago	1
Cuba	2
