= Panama national under-17 football team =

Panama Under 17
- Nickname: La Rojita
- Association: Federación Panameña de Fútbol
- Confederation: CONCACAF
- Head coach: (United States) (Panama) Mike Stump
- Captain: Juriel Nereida
- FIFA code: PAN
| First colours | Second colours |

FIFA U-17 World Cup
- Appearances: 5 (first in 2011)
- Best result: Round of 16 (2011)

CONCACAF Under-17 Championship
- Appearances: 10 (first in 1985)
- Best result: Runners-up (2013)

The Panama under-17 men's national football team is the national under-17 football team of Panama and is controlled by the Federación Panameña de Fútbol. The highest level of competition in which the team may compete is in the FIFA U-17 World Cup, which is held every two years.

== UNCAF and CONCACAF U-17 Championship record ==
| UNCAF | | | | | | | | CONCACAF | | | | | | | |
| Year | Position | GP | W | D | L | GS | GA | Year | Position | GP | W | D | L | GS | GA |
|---|---|---|---|---|---|---|---|---|---|---|---|---|---|---|---|
| | | | | | | | | (Trinidad and Tobago) 1983 | Did not enter | | | | | | |
| | | | | | | | | (Mexico) 1985 | 4/5 | 5 | 1 | 0 | 4 | 4 | 19 |
| | | | | | | | | (Honduras) 1987 | Did not enter | | | | | | |
| | | | | | | | | (Trinidad and Tobago) 1988 | Did not enter | | | | | | |
| | | | | | | | | (Trinidad and Tobago) 1991 | 3/4 | 3 | 1 | 0 | 2 | 4 | 7 |
| | | | | | | | | (Cuba) 1992¹ | 3/4 | 3 | 1 | 0 | 2 | 6 | 12 |
| | | | | | | | | (El Salvador) 1994 | 4/4 | 3 | 1 | 0 | 2 | 4 | 13 |
| | | | | | | | | (Trinidad and Tobago) 1996 | Did not enter | | | | | | |
| 1998 | 2/3 | 2 | 0 | 0 | 2 | 0 | 4 | (El Salvador) / (Jamaica) 1999 | Did not qualify | | | | | | |
| (Guatemala) 2000 | 3/4 | 4 | 1 | 0 | 3 | 6 | 10 | (Honduras) / (United States) 2001 | Did not qualify | | | | | | |
| (Honduras) / (Panama) 2002 | 2/3 | 2 | 1 | 1 | 0 | 6 | 2 | (Canada) / (Guatemala) 2003 | Did not qualify | | | | | | |
| (Honduras) / (El Salvador) 2004 | 2/3 | 2 | 1 | 0 | 1 | 7 | 3 | (Costa Rica) / (Mexico) 2005 | Did not qualify | | | | | | |
| (El Salvador) 2006 | 3/5 | 4 | 2 | 1 | 1 | 5 | 4 | (Jamaica) / (Honduras) 2007 | Did not qualify | | | | | | |
| (Panama) / (El Salvador) 2008 | 2/7 | 4 | 1 | 1 | 2 | 7 | 3 | (Mexico) 2009 | Did not qualify | | | | | | |
| (Guatemala) / (Costa Rica) 2010 | 2/3 | 2 | 1 | 0 | 1 | 1 | 1 | (Jamaica) 2011 | 3/12 | 5 | 2 | 1 | 2 | 2 | 2 |
| (Guatemala) 2012 | Qualified as hosts | | | | | | | (Panama) 2013 | 2/12 | 5 | 3 | 1 | 1 | 10 | 6 |
| (Costa Rica) / (Panama) 2014 | 1/3 | 2 | 2 | 0 | 0 | 9 | 1 | (Honduras) 2015 | 7/12 | 5 | 3 | 0 | 2 | 15 | 7 |
| (Costa Rica) 2016 | Qualified as hosts | | | | | | | (Panama) 2017 | 5/12 | 5 | 2 | 1 | 2 | 6 | 5 |
| (Guatemala) 2018 | Suspended | | | | | | | (United States) 2019 | 7/20 | 5 | 2 | 2 | 1 | 10 | 9 |
| (Honduras) 2022 | 4/4 | 4 | 2 | 0 | 2 | 4 | 3 | (Guatemala) 2023 | 3/20 | 6 | 4 | 1 | 1 | 10 | 7 |
| Total | – | 26 | 11 | 3 | 12 | 45 | 31 | Total | – | 45 | 20 | 6 | 19 | 71 | 87 |

^{1} Panama was invited after El Salvador declined its invitation.

== FIFA U-17 World Cup record ==
FIFA U-17 World Cup record
| Year | Round | Position | Pld | W | D* | L | GF | GA | Pts |
|---|---|---|---|---|---|---|---|---|---|
| (China) 1985 | Did not qualify | | | | | | | | |
| (Canada) 1987 | Did not enter | | | | | | | | |
| (Scotland) 1989 | Did not enter | | | | | | | | |
| (Italy) 1991 | Did not qualify | | | | | | | | |
| (Japan) 1993 | Did not qualify | | | | | | | | |
| (Ecuador) 1995 | Did not qualify | | | | | | | | |
| (Egypt) 1997 | Did not enter | | | | | | | | |
| (New Zealand) 1999 | Did not qualify | | | | | | | | |
| (Trinidad and Tobago) 2001 | Did not qualify | | | | | | | | |
| (Finland) 2003 | Did not qualify | | | | | | | | |
| (Peru) 2005 | Did not qualify | | | | | | | | |
| (South Korea) 2007 | Did not qualify | | | | | | | | |
| (Nigeria) 2009 | Did not qualify | | | | | | | | |
| (Mexico) 2011 | Round of 16 | 16th | 4 | 1 | 0 | 3 | 2 | 6 | 3 |
| (United Arab Emirates) 2013 | Group stage | 20th | 3 | 0 | 0 | 3 | 2 | 7 | 0 |
| (Chile) 2015 | Did not qualify | | | | | | | | |
| (India) 2017 | Did not qualify | | | | | | | | |
| (Brazil) 2019 | Did not qualify | | | | | | | | |
| (Indonesia) 2023 | Group Stage | 19th | 3 | 0 | 2 | 1 | 2 | 4 | 2 |
| (Qatar) 2025 | Group Stage | 45th | 3 | 0 | 0 | 3 | 3 | 12 | 0 |
| (Qatar) 2026 | In progress | TBD | 1 | 0 | 0 | 1 | 0 | 1 | 0 |
| Total:5/21 | Round of 16 | 16th | 14 | 1 | 2 | 11 | 9 | 31 | 5 |

*Draws include knockout matches decided on penalty kicks

== Current squad ==
The following 21 players were selected to play in the most recent fixtures of the 2026 CONCACAF U-17 World Cup qualification.

Head coach: (Panama) Felipe Baloy

| No. | Pos. | Player | Date of birth (age) | Club |
|---|---|---|---|---|
| 1 | GK | Isaías Abuabara | 26 October 2010 (age 16) | (Royal Spanish Football Federation) Celta |
| 12 | GK | Adamir Aparicio | 14 January 2009 (age 17) | (Panamanian Football Federation) Plaza Amador |
| 16 | GK | Sebastián Sotelo | 7 March 2010 (age 16) | (Panamanian Football Federation) Plaza Amador |
| 2 | DF | Cristian Ibarra | 16 May 2009 (age 17) | (Panamanian Football Federation) Plaza Amador |
| 3 | DF | Stephen Domínguez | 19 January 2009 (age 17) | (Panamanian Football Federation) Sporting San Miguelito |
| 4 | DF | Arián Reyes | 19 April 2009 (age 17) | (United States Soccer Federation) Indiana Fire |
| 11 | DF | Joseph Choy | 28 May 2009 (age 17) | (Panamanian Football Federation) Academia Costa del Este |
| 13 | DF | Alberto Adams | 9 April 2009 (age 17) | (Panamanian Football Federation) Plaza Amador |
| 17 | DF | Davis Wallace | 25 January 2010 (age 16) | (Panamanian Football Federation) Sporting San Miguelito |
| 20 | DF | Gabriel Quiroz | 14 January 2009 (age 17) | (Panamanian Football Federation) Tauro |
| 15 | DF | Emanuel Edwards | 31 July 2009 (age 17) | (Panamanian Football Federation) C. A. Independiente |
| 5 | MF | Lucas Norte | 16 July 2009 (age 17) | (Panamanian Football Federation) Plaza Amador |
| 6 | MF | Jossimar Insturain | 7 June 2009 (age 17) | (Panamanian Football Federation) Tauro |
| 7 | MF | Alexander Tull | 20 May 2010 (age 16) | (Panamanian Football Federation) C. A. Independiente |
| 14 | MF | Lucio Ceballos | 13 May 2009 (age 17) | (Panamanian Football Federation) Sporting San Miguelito |
| 18 | MF | Oliver Pinzón | 14 January 2009 (age 17) | (Panamanian Football Federation) Universidad Latina de Panamá |
| 21 | MF | Pablo Arosemena | 11 May 2009 (age 17) | (Royal Spanish Football Federation) Ourense |
| 8 | MF | Alfredo Maduro | 18 March 2010 (age 16) | (Panamanian Football Federation) Academia Costa del Este |
| 10 | FW | Estevis López | 22 October 2009 (age 17) | (Panamanian Football Federation) Veraguas |
| 9 | FW | Ronaldo Matos | 30 May 2009 (age 17) | (Panamanian Football Federation) Sporting San Miguelito |
| 19 | FW | Thiago Chalmers | 12 December 2009 (age 16) | (Panamanian Football Federation) Plaza Amador |

== Honours ==
- CONCACAF Under-17 Championship
  - Runners-up (1): 2013

== See also ==
- Federación Panameña de Fútbol
- FIFA U-17 World Cup
- CONCACAF Under-17 Championship
