= CONCACAF Under-17 World Cup Qualification =

CONCACAF U-17 World Cup qualification
- Organiser(s): CONCACAF
- Founded: 1983; 43 years ago
- Region: North America
- Teams: 36
- Current champions: Mexico (9th title)
- Most championships: Mexico (9 titles)
- Website: Official website
- 2026 CONCACAF U-17 World Cup qualification

The CONCACAF U-17 World Cup qualification is an international association football event in the North America, Central America and the Caribbean region, and is the qualification tournament for the FIFA U-17 World Cup.

== Results ==
In 2009 the tournament returned to a championship format in which all four semifinalists qualify to the FIFA U-17 World Cup. The 2009 tournament was cut short due to the swine flu outbreak in Mexico. No championship round was played as a result of the cancellation, and the tournament ended with four teams qualifying to the 2009 FIFA U-17 World Cup without determining a regional champion. Until 1988 the tournament was held as an Under 16 edition.

Under-16 Tournament
Edition	Year	Host	Champion	2nd Place	3rd Place	4th Place
1	1983; Details	Trinidad and Tobago	United States	Trinidad and Tobago	Mexico	Honduras
Under-16 Championship
Edition	Year	Host	Champion	2nd Place	3rd Place	4th Place
2	1985; Details	Mexico	Mexico	Costa Rica	Canada	Honduras
Played in a Final group of 4.
3	1987; Details	Honduras	Mexico	United States	Costa Rica	Honduras
Played in a Final group of 4.
4	1988; Details	Trinidad and Tobago	Cuba	United States	Canada	Trinidad and Tobago
Played in a Final group of 4.
Under-17 Tournament
Edition	Year	Host	Champion	2nd Place	3rd Place	4th Place
5	1991; Details	Trinidad and Tobago	Mexico	United States	Cuba	Trinidad and Tobago
Played in a Final group of 4.
6	1992; Details	Cuba	United States	Mexico	Canada	Cuba
Played in a Final group of 4.
7	1994; Details	El Salvador	Costa Rica	United States	Canada	Mexico
Played in a Final group of 4.
Under-17 Championship
Edition	Year	Host	Champion	2nd Place	3rd Place	4th Place
8	1996; Details	Trinidad and Tobago	Mexico	United States	Costa Rica	Canada
Played in a Final group of 4.
Under-17 Tournament
Edition	Year	Host	Champion	Playoff Winner		
9	1999; Details	Jamaica (A)	Jamaica	United States		
9	1999; Details	El Salvador (B)	Mexico	United States		
Played in two Final groups of 4.
10	2001; Details	United States (A)	United States	None		
10	2001; Details	Honduras (B)	Costa Rica	None		
Played in two Final groups of 4.
11	2003; Details	Guatemala (A)	United States	Mexico		
11	2003; Details	Canada (B)	Costa Rica	Mexico		
Played in two Final groups of 4.
12	2005; Details	Costa Rica (A)	United States	Costa Rica		
12	2005; Details	Mexico (B)	Mexico	Costa Rica		
Played in two Final groups of 4.
13	2007; Details	Honduras (A)	Haiti	None		
13	2007; Details	Jamaica (B)	United States	None		
Played in two Final groups of 4.
U-17 Championship
Edition	Year	Host	Qualified	Qualified	Qualified	Qualified
14	2009; Details	Mexico	Mexico	United States	Honduras	Costa Rica
The championship round was not played because it was cancelled due to the 2009 flu pandemic outbreak.
Edition	Year	Host	Champion	2nd Place	3rd Place	4th Place
15	2011; Details	Jamaica	United States	Canada	Panama	Jamaica
Final: CAN 0–3 USA; Third Place Match: JAM 0–1 PAN.
16	2013; Details	Panama	Mexico	Panama	Canada	Honduras
Final: PAN 1–2 MEX; Third Place Match: CAN 2–2 (4–2 p.) HON.
17	2015; Details	Honduras	Mexico	Honduras	Costa Rica and United States	
Final: HON 0–3 MEX.
18	2017; Details	Panama	Mexico	United States	Honduras and Costa Rica	
Final: USA 1–1 (4–5 p.) MEX
19	2019; Details	United States	Mexico	United States	Canada and Haiti	
Final: MEX 2–1 (a.e.t.) USA
	2020; Details	Cancelled due to COVID-19 pandemic				
20	2023; Details	Guatemala	Mexico	United States	Canada and Panama	
Final: MEX 3–1 USA
Under-17 World Cup Qualification
Edition	Year	Host	Qualified	Playoff Winner		
21	2025; Details	Bermuda Costa Rica Mexico Honduras Guatemala Costa Rica Panama Guatemala	Group A: Canada	None		
21	2025; Details	Bermuda Costa Rica Mexico Honduras Guatemala Costa Rica Panama Guatemala	Group B: Costa Rica	None		
21	2025; Details	Bermuda Costa Rica Mexico Honduras Guatemala Costa Rica Panama Guatemala	Group C: Mexico	None		
21	2025; Details	Bermuda Costa Rica Mexico Honduras Guatemala Costa Rica Panama Guatemala	Group D: Honduras	None		
21	2025; Details	Bermuda Costa Rica Mexico Honduras Guatemala Costa Rica Panama Guatemala	Group E: Haiti	None		
21	2025; Details	Bermuda Costa Rica Mexico Honduras Guatemala Costa Rica Panama Guatemala	Group F: United States	None		
21	2025; Details	Bermuda Costa Rica Mexico Honduras Guatemala Costa Rica Panama Guatemala	Group G: Panama	None		
21	2025; Details	Bermuda Costa Rica Mexico Honduras Guatemala Costa Rica Panama Guatemala	Group H: El Salvador	None		
22	2026; Details	Costa Rica Guatemala Honduras Panama Saint Vincent and the Grenadines Trinidad and Tobago	Group A: Mexico	None		
22	2026; Details	Costa Rica Guatemala Honduras Panama Saint Vincent and the Grenadines Trinidad and Tobago	Group B: Panama	None		
22	2026; Details	Costa Rica Guatemala Honduras Panama Saint Vincent and the Grenadines Trinidad and Tobago	Group C: Haiti	None		
22	2026; Details	Costa Rica Guatemala Honduras Panama Saint Vincent and the Grenadines Trinidad and Tobago	Group D: Costa Rica	None		
22	2026; Details	Costa Rica Guatemala Honduras Panama Saint Vincent and the Grenadines Trinidad and Tobago	Group E: United States	None		
22	2026; Details	Costa Rica Guatemala Honduras Panama Saint Vincent and the Grenadines Trinidad and Tobago	Group F: Cuba	None		
22	2026; Details	Costa Rica Guatemala Honduras Panama Saint Vincent and the Grenadines Trinidad and Tobago	Group G: Jamaica	None		
22	2026; Details	Costa Rica Guatemala Honduras Panama Saint Vincent and the Grenadines Trinidad and Tobago	Group H: Honduras	None		

== Winners by country ==
Team	Titles	Runners-up
Mexico	9 (1985, 1987, 1991, 1996, 2013, 2015, 2017, 2019, 2023)	1 (1992)
United States	3 (1983, 1992, 2011)	8 (1987, 1988, 1991, 1994, 1996, 2017, 2019, 2023)
Costa Rica	1 (1994)	1 (1985)
Cuba	1 (1988)	
Trinidad and Tobago		1 (1983)
Canada		1 (2011)
Panama		1 (2013)
Honduras		1 (2015)

Note: no titles or runners-up between 1999 and 2009 and 2025.

== Comprehensive team results by tournament ==
Legend:

- 1st – Champions
- 2nd – Runners-up
- 3rd – Third Place
- 4th – Fourth Place
- SF – Semi-finalists
- QF – Quarter-finals
- R2 – Round 2
- R16 – Round of 16
- GS – Group stage
- Q – Qualified for upcoming tournament
- 1A/1B/1C/1D/1E/1F/1G/1H – First place Group A/B/C/D/E/F/G/H
- 2A/2B/2C/2D/2E/2F/2G/2H – Second place Group A/B/C/D/E/F/G/H
- 3A/3B/3C/3D/3E/3F/3G/3H – Third place Group A/B/C/D/E/F/G/H
- 4A/4B/4C/4D/4E/4F/4G/4H – Fourth place Group A/B/C/D/E/F/G/H
- 5th – Fifth place in Group
- • – Playoff Winner
- •• – Qualified but withdrew
- • – Did not qualify
- × – Did not enter
- × – Withdrew / Banned / Entry not accepted by FIFA
- — Country not affiliated to CONCACAF at that time
- — Country did not exist or national team was inactive
- – Hosts
- – Not affiliated to FIFA

Nation	1983	1985	1987	1988	1991	1992	1994	1996	1999	2001	2003	2005	2007	2009	2011	2013	2015	2017	2019	2023	2025	2026	Total
Anguilla	×	×	×	×	×	×	×	×	×	•	×	×	•	×	•	×	×	•	•	•	5th	3B	2
Antigua and Barbuda	×	×	×	×	×	×	×	×	×	•	•	•	•	•	•	•	•	•	•	•	3E	3C	2
Aruba	×	×	×	×	×	GS	×	•	•	•	•	•	•	•	•	•	•	•	•	•	3G	3G	3
Barbados	×	×	×	×	×	×	×	×	•	•	•	•	•	•	GS	GS	•	•	GS	GS	3C	2A	6
Belize	Not a CONCACAF member		×	×	×	×	×	×	×	×	•	•	×	•	×	×	•	•	•	•	4C	3F	2
Bermuda	×	×	×	×	×	×	×	GS	•	•	•	•	•	•	•	•	•	•	GS	R16	3A	3H	5
Bonaire	Part of Netherlands Antilles																×	×	•	•	4D	×	1
British Virgin Islands	Not a CONCACAF member		×	×	×	×	×	×	×	×	×	•	×	×	×	•	×	•	×	•	4B	4D	2
Canada	×	3rd	×	3rd	GS	3rd	3rd	4th	3B	2A	3B	3B	4B	4A	2nd	3rd	R2	GS	SF	SF	1A	2G	20
Cayman Islands	Not a CONCACAF member		×	×	×	GS	×	×	×	•	•	•	•	•	•	•	•	•	•	•	4H	4G	3
Costa Rica	×	2nd	3rd	GS	×	GS	1st	3rd	3A	1B	1B	2A•	2B	2B	QF	GS	SF	SF	QF	R16	1B	1D	20
Cuba	×	×	×	1st	3rd	4th	×	×	×	•	4B	3A	•	3A	GS	GS	GS	R2	×	R16	2F	1F	12
Curaçao	Part of Netherlands Antilles															•	•	GS	R16	GS	2A	4F	5
Dominica	×	×	×	×	×	×	×	×	•	•	•	×	•	•	•	×	•	•	•	•	5th	4B	2
Dominican Republic	×	×	×	×	×	×	GS	GS	×	•	×	•	•	•	•	•	•	•	R16	R16	2G	2E	6
El Salvador	GS	GS	GS	GS	GS	×	GS	GS	2B	3A	3A	4A	4A	•	QF	•	•	GS	QF	QF	1H	2F	18
Grenada	×	×	×	×	×	×	×	×	×	•	•	•	•	•	•	×	•	•	•	•	4G	4C	2
Guadeloupe	×	×	×	×	×	×	×	×	×	×	×	×	×	•	×	×	•	•	R16	GS	×	••	2
Guatemala	×	GS	×	GS	GS	GS	×	GS	•	•	4A	•	•	3B	GS	QF	GS	×	R16	QF	2E	2C	14
Guyana	×	×	×	×	×	×	×	•	•	•	•	•	•	•	•	•	•	•	GS	•	3B	2G	3
Haiti	×	×	×	×	×	×	×	×	×	3B	•	4B	1A	•	GS	GS	GS	GS	SF	R16	1E	1C	11
Honduras	4th	4th	4th	GS	GS	GS	GS	GS	4A	4B	•	2B	2A	2A	QF	4th	2nd	SF	QF	QF	1D	1H	21
Jamaica	×	×	GS	GS	GS	GS	GS	×	1A	4A	2A	•	5B	•	4th	QF	R2	GS	R16	R16	2H	1G	17
Martinique	×	×	×	×	×	×	×	GS	×	×	×	×	×	×	×	×	•	×	•	•	×	×	1
Mexico	3rd	1st	1st	×	1st	2nd	4th	1st	1B	2B	2B•	1B	3A	1B	×	1st	1st	1st	1st	1st	1C	1A	20
Netherlands Antilles	×	GS	×	×	GS	GS	GS	GS	•	•	×	•	•	•	•								5
Nicaragua	×	×	×	×	×	×	GS	×	•	•	•	•	•	•	•	•	•	•	R16	R16	2C	2B	5
Panama	×	GS	×	×	GS	GS	GS	×	•	•	•	•	•	•	3rd	2nd	GS	R2	QF	SF	1G	1B	12
Puerto Rico	GS	×	×	×	GS	×	×	×	×	•	•	×	•	×	×	•	•	•	R16	QF	2D	2D	6
Saint Kitts and Nevis	×	×	×	×	×	×	×	×	×	×	×	×	•	•	•	•	×	•	•	•	3F	3E	2
Saint Lucia	×	×	×	GS	×	×	×	×	•	•	•	•	•	×	×	•	GS	•	×	×	3H	×	3
Saint Martin	Not a CONCACAF member				×	×	×	×	×	×	×	×	•	×	•	×	×	•	•	•	3D	4A	2
Saint Vincent and the Grenadines	Not a CONCACAF member		×	×	×	×	×	×	•	•	•	•	•	•	•	×	×	•	•	•	4E	4E	2
Sint Maarten	×	×	×	×	×	×	×	×	×	×	×	×	×	×	×	×	×	×	×	×	5th	5th	2
Suriname	×	×	×	×	×	×	×	•	×	•	×	•	•	•	•	•	•	GS	GS	GS	×	••	3
Trinidad and Tobago	2nd	GS	GS	4th	4th	×	GS	GS	4B	×	•	•	3B	4B	QF	QF	GS	•	R16	R16	2B	3A	17
Turks and Caicos Islands	Not a CONCACAF member									×	×	×	×	•	×	×	×	×	×	•	4A	3D	2
U.S. Virgin Islands	Not a CONCACAF member									•	•	×	•	•	×	•	•	•	•	•	4F	×	1
United States	1st	×	2nd	2nd	2nd	1st	2nd	2nd	2A•	1A	1A	1A	1B	1A	1st	QF	SF	2nd	2nd	2nd	1F	1E	21

== Men's U-17 World Cup Qualifiers ==
Legend

- 1st – Champions
- 2nd – Runners-up
- 3rd – Third place
- 4th – Fourth place
- QF – Quarterfinals
- R16 – Round of 16
- R32 – Round of 32
- GS – Group stage
- R2 – Round 2
- R1 – Round 1
- – Hosts
- Q – Qualified for upcoming tournament

Team	(China) 1985	(Canada) 1987	(Scotland) 1989	(Italy) 1991	(Japan) 1993	(Ecuador) 1995	(Egypt) 1997	(New Zealand) 1999	(Trinidad and Tobago) 2001	(Finland) 2003	(Peru) 2005	(South Korea) 2007	(Nigeria) 2009	(Mexico) 2011	(United Arab Emirates) 2013	(Chile) 2015	(India) 2017	(Brazil) 2019	(Indonesia) 2023	(Qatar) 2025	(Qatar) 2026	Total
Canada		R1	R1		R1	R1								R1	R1			R1	R1	R32		9
Costa Rica	R1					R1	R1		QF	QF	QF	R2	R1			QF	R1			GS	Q	12
Cuba			R1	R1																	Q	3
El Salvador																				GS		1
Haiti												R1						R1		GS	Q	4
Honduras												R1	R1		QF	R1	R2			GS	Q	7
Jamaica								R1						R1							Q	3
Mexico	R1	R1		R1	R1		R1	QF		QF	1st		R2	1st	2nd	4th	R2	2nd	R2	R16	Q	17
Panama														R2	R1				R1	GS	Q	5
Trinidad and Tobago									R1			R1										2
United States	R1	R1	R1	QF	QF	R1	R1	4th	R1	QF	QF	R2	R2	R2		R1	QF	R1	R2	R32	Q	20

== See also ==
- CONCACAF Under-20 Championship
- FIFA U-17 World Cup
- CONCACAF Women's U-17 Championship
- CONCACAF
