= Haiti national under-17 football team =

National under-17 association football team representing Haiti

Haiti
- Nickname(s): Les Grenadiers; Le Rouge et Bleu; Les Bicolores; La Sélection Nationale
- Association: Fédération Haïtienne de Football
- Confederation: CONCACAF
- Sub-confederation: CFU (Caribbean)
- Head coach: Eddy César
- Home stadium: Stade Sylvio Cator
- FIFA code: HAI
First colours	Second colours

FIFA U-17 World Cup
- Appearances: 4 (first in 2007)
- Best result: Group stage (2007, 2019)

CONCACAF Under-17 Championship
- Appearances: 9 (first in 2001)
- Best result: Third place (2019)

The Haiti national under-17 football team represents Haiti in international football at this age level and is controlled by the Fédération Haïtienne de Football (FHF).

== Competitive record ==
=== FIFA U-17 World Cup ===
FIFA U-17 World Cup record
Year	Result	Position	Pld	W	D*	L	GF	GA
(China) 1985	Did not qualify							
(Canada) 1987	Did not enter							
(Scotland) 1989	Did not enter							
(Italy) 1991	Did not qualify							
(Japan) 1993	Did not enter							
(Ecuador) 1995	Did not enter							
(Egypt) 1997	Did not qualify							
(New Zealand) 1999	Did not qualify							
(Trinidad and Tobago) 2001	Did not qualify							
(Finland) 2003	Did not qualify							
(Peru) 2005	Did not qualify							
(South Korea) 2007	Group stage	21st	3	0	1	2	3	8
(Nigeria) 2009	Did not qualify							
(Mexico) 2011	Did not qualify							
(United Arab Emirates) 2013	Did not qualify							
(Chile) 2015	Did not qualify							
(India) 2017	Did not qualify							
(Brazil) 2019	Group stage	21st	3	0	0	3	3	8
(Indonesia) 2023	Did not qualify							
(Qatar) 2025	Group stage	47th	3	0	0	3	4	16
(Qatar) 2026	In progress	TBD	1	0	0	1	1	3
Total:4/21	Group stage	21st	10	0	1	9	11	35

=== CONCACAF U-17 Championship ===
CONCACAF U-17 Championship
Year	Result	Position	Pld	W	D*	L	GF	GA
(Trinidad and Tobago) 1983	Did not qualify							
(Mexico) 1985	Did not qualify							
(Honduras) 1987	Did not enter							
(Cuba) 1988	Did not enter							
(Trinidad and Tobago) 1991	Did not qualify							
(Cuba) 1992	Did not qualify							
(El Salvador) 1994	Did not qualify							
(Trinidad and Tobago) 1996	Did not qualify							
(Jamaica) (El Salvador) 1999	Did not qualify							
(Honduras) (United States) 2001	Group stage	6th	3	1	0	2	2	9
(Guatemala) (Canada) 2003	Did not qualify							
(Costa Rica) (Mexico) 2005	Group stage	8th	3	0	1	2	1	8
(Honduras) (Jamaica) 2007	Fourth place	4th	3	1	2	0	4	1
(Mexico) 2009	Did not qualify; cancelled							
(Jamaica) 2011	Group stage	11th	2	0	0	2	1	6
(Panama) 2013	Group stage	11th	2	0	0	2	1	6
(Honduras) 2015	Group stage	10th	5	1	0	4	6	17
(Panama) 2017	Group stage	10th	3	0	1	2	1	4
(United States) 2019	Semi-finals	3rd	6	4	1	1	15	3
(Guatemala) 2023	Round of 16	TBD	4	1	0	3	4	7
Total	Semi-finals	9/20	31	8	5	18	35	61
CONCACAF Under-17 World Cup Qualification
(Bermuda) (Costa Rica) (Guatemala) (Honduras) (Mexico) (Panama) 2025	Group E winner		3	3	0	0	10	0
(Costa Rica) (Guatemala) (Honduras) (Panama) (Saint Vincent and the Grenadines) (Trinidad and Tobago) 2026	Group C winner		3	3	0	0	11	2
Total	—N/a	2/2	6	6	0	0	21	2

== Players ==
=== Current squad ===
The following 20 players were selected for the most recent fixtures in the 2026 CONCACAF U-17 World Cup qualification.

No.	Pos.	Player	Date of birth (age)	Club
1	GK	Clifford Gene	6 September 2009 (age 17)	(Jamaica Football Federation) Mount Pleasant F.A.
12	GK	Stephane Gilles	13 March 2010 (age 16)	
21	GK	Rodnelson Dor	23 May 2009 (age 17)	
5	DF	Miguel Joseph (captain)	14 September 2009 (age 17)	(Jamaica Football Federation) Mount Pleasant F.A.
19	DF	Jeffte Timeus	2 August 2009 (age 17)	
3	DF	Stanley Louis	15 July 2009 (age 17)	(Haitian Football Federation) Aigle Noir AC
4	DF	Adolphe Guerrier	17 April 2010 (age 16)	
16	DF	Sonson Jean-Baptiste	3 November 2010 (age 16)	
2	DF	Guivens Barjon	15 February 2010 (age 16)	
6	MF	Danrick Dalce	5 January 2010 (age 16)	
13	MF	Mikenley Chery	21 April 2010 (age 16)	
14	MF	Neil Ewald	1 January 2009 (age 17)	
15	MF	Rhode Louissaint	4 January 2010 (age 16)	(Haitian Football Federation) Stars des Jeunes
18	MF	Movenson Joseph	26 January 2010 (age 16)	
17	FW	Jhon-Widy Belton	14 June 2009 (age 17)	
20	FW	Macenat Prophète	20 December 2009 (age 16)	(Haitian Football Federation) Leg A-Z
7	FW	Julien Casillas	15 August 2010 (age 16)	(Haitian Football Federation) Exafoot Académie
9	FW	Marvenly Exiles	24 June 2010 (age 16)	
10	FW	Emerson Laïssé	19 August 2009 (age 17)	(Jamaica Football Federation) Mount Pleasant F.A.
11	FW	Ralph Jean-Pierre	14 August 2010 (age 16)	

== Honours ==
Major competitions

- CONCACAF U-17 Championship
  - Third place (1): 2019
  - Fourth place (1): 2007

Minor competitions

- CFU Under-17 Championship
  - Winners (2): 2000, 2016
- CFU Youth Cup
  - Runners-up (1): 2006
  - Fourth place (1): 2008

== See also ==
- Haiti national football team
- Haiti national under-15 football team
- Haiti national under-20 football team
- Haiti national under-23 football team
