= 2009 CONCACAF U-17 Championship qualification =

The 2009 CONCACAF U-17 Championship qualification tournaments took place in 2008 to qualify national teams for the 2009 CONCACAF U-17 Championship, which was played in Mexico from 21 April to 9 May 2009.

== Central American Zone ==
=== Group A ===
Matches in Group A were hosted by Panama's association football governing body, FEPAFUT, the Federación Panameña de Fútbol. All matches took place at Estadio Virgilio Tejeira in the city of Penonomé.

Team	GP	W	D	L	F	A	+/−	P
Honduras	2	2	0	0	10	0	+10	6
Panama	2	1	0	1	6	1	+5	3
Belize	2	0	0	2	0	15	−15	0

18 November 2008
15:30

Belize	0 – 9	Honduras
	(Report)	Lozano 34', 51', 61', 78', 90'; López 53'; Padilla 64'; Fuentes 79'; Martínez 89'

Estadio Virgilio Tejeira, Penonomé, Coclé
Attendance: 200
Referee: Juan Alfredo Núñez (Nicaragua)

20 November 2008
15:30

Panama	0 – 1	Honduras
	(Report)	Lozano 90'

Estadio Virgilio Tejeira, Penonomé, Coclé
Attendance: 742
Referee: Juan Alfredo Núñez (Nicaragua)

22 November 2008
15:30

Panama	6 – 0	Belize
Pinto 6', 68'; Segundo 27' (pen.); Rodriguez 31'; Ortiz 79'; Hurtado 85'	(Report)

Estadio Virgilio Tejeira, Penonomé, Coclé
Attendance: 330
Referee: Marlon Mejía (El Salvador)

=== Group B ===
Matches in Group B were hosted by El Salvador's association football governing body, Federación Salvadoreña de Fútbol. All matches took place in the Estadio Cuscatlán in the city of San Salvador.

Team	GP	W	D	L	F	A	+/−	PTS
Costa Rica	3	3	0	0	10	1	+9	9
Guatemala	3	1	1	1	15	3	+12	4
El Salvador	3	1	1	1	8	4	+4	4
Nicaragua	3	0	0	3	0	25	−25	0

12 November 2008

Costa Rica	7 – 0	Nicaragua
Campbell 5', 31', 58', 63' (pen.); Vega 43'; Moya 87'; Bustos 90+'	(Report)

Estadio Cuscatlán, San Salvador
Attendance: 50
Referee: Juan Amaya (Panama)
12 November 2008

El Salvador	2 – 2	Guatemala
Guevara 81', 90+'	(Report)	López 10'; Herrarte 29'

Estadio Cuscatlán, San Salvador
Attendance: 1,000
Referee: Oscar Moncada (Honduras)

14 November 2008
17:00

Costa Rica	1 – 0	Guatemala
Campbell 39'	(Report)

Estadio Cuscatlán, San Salvador
Attendance: 750
Referee: Luis Rodríguez (Panama)
14 November 2008
19:30

El Salvador	5 – 0	Nicaragua
Guevara 24', 90+'; Barahona 31'; Bustillo 32'; Urquilla 83'	(Report)

Estadio Cuscatlán, San Salvador
Attendance: 750
Referee: Gerald Henry (Belize)

16 November 2008
15:00

Guatemala	13 – 0	Nicaragua
López 3', 13', 42', 53'; Herrate 8', 24', 65'; Ceballos 29'; Navas 59' (pen.), 60', 70', 84'; Castillo 68' (pen.)	(Report)

Estadio Cuscatlán, San Salvador
Attendance: 1,413
Referee: Juan Amaya (Panama)
16 November 2008
17:30

El Salvador	1 – 2	Costa Rica
Bustillo 84'	(Report)	Rojas 16'; Vega 87'

Estadio Cuscatlán, San Salvador
Attendance: 1,413
Referee: Luis Rodríguez (Panama)

=== Playoff ===
The runner-up from each Central American group played a two-legged playoff to determine the 8th and final team to qualify for the tournament proper. Guatemala won the two-legged playoff 2:1 on aggregate score.

26 November 2008

Guatemala	1 – 1	Panama
Ceballos 59'	(Report)	Sanjur 14'

Estadio Cementos Progreso, Guatemala City
Attendance: 800
Referee: Joel Aguilar (El Salvador)

1 December 2008

Panama	0 – 1	Guatemala
	(Report)	Navas 28'

Estadio Virgilio Tejeira, Penonomé, Coclé
Attendance: 900
Referee: Jose Gaspar Monila (Honduras)

== Caribbean Zone ==
Caribbean qualifying was determined in the 2008 CFU Youth Cup. Cuba qualified with Trinidad and Tobago by reaching the final.
