= Bermuda national under-17 football team =

National association football team

Bermuda
- Nickname: Gombey Warriors
- Association: Bermuda Football Association
- Confederation: CONCACAF (North America)
- Sub-confederation: CFU (Caribbean)
- Head coach: (Bermuda) Cecoy Robinson
- Captain: Arnezha Astwood
- Home stadium: Bermuda National Stadium
- FIFA code: BER
First colours	Second colours

First international
- Bermuda 0–5 United States (Port of Spain, Trinidad and Tobago; 18 August 1996)

Biggest win
- Saint Martin 0–9 Bermuda (1 September 2022)

Biggest defeat
- Canada 10–0 Bermuda (Montreal, Canada; 15 August 2006)

FIFA U-17 World Cup
- Appearances: 0

CONCACAF U-17 Championship
- Appearances: 3 (first in 1996)
- Best result: Round of 16 (2023)

The Bermuda national under-17 football team represents Bermuda in international football, and is controlled by the Bermuda Football Association, which is a member of the CONCACAF. The team compete in the CONCACAF U-17 Championship.

== Fixtures and recent results ==
The following is a list of match results from the previous 12 months, as well as any future matches that have been scheduled.

Win Draw Loss

== Players ==
=== Current squad ===
The following 21 players have been named for the most recent fixtures in the 2026 CONCACAF U-17 World Cup qualification.

Head coach: Aaron Lugo

No.	Pos.	Player	Date of birth (age)	Club
1	GK	Curtis Jackson	9 May 2009 (age 17)	
12	GK	Ethan Adderley	26 December 2009 (age 16)	
21	GK	Nuri Latham	9 January 2011 (age 15)	(The Football Association) Preston
3	DF	Norico Furbert	June 29, 2009 (age 17)	
2	DF	Kayuri Tucker	4 February 2010 (age 16)	(Bermuda Football Association) Dandy Town Hornets
4	DF	Milliunh Hill	2 February 2009 (age 17)	
5	DF	Amir Weller	14 January 2010 (age 16)	
6	MF	Amir Brangman	7 June 2009 (age 17)	(Bermuda Football Association) North Village Rams
8	MF	Tyler Steede	16 April 2009 (age 17)	
11	MF	Kaiyuri Albuoy	25 January 2010 (age 16)	(Bermuda Football Association) North Village Rams
13	MF	Roman Wilkinson	31 May 2010 (age 16)	(Bermuda Football Association) North Village Rams
14	MF	Joshua Smith	21 July 2009 (age 17)	
15	MF	Shiloh Waite	8 May 2009 (age 17)	
20	MF	Rylan Desilva	18 May 2010 (age 16)	(Bermuda Football Association) Dandy Town Hornets
18	MF	Mateus Amaral	30 January 2009 (age 17)	
10	FW	Z'Ani Jennings	28 January 2010 (age 16)	(The Football Association) Sheffield United
7	FW	Na'im Zuill	7 December 2009 (age 16)	(The Football Association) Bolton Wanderers
16	FW	Deacon Wade	20 December 2010 (age 15)	(Bermuda Football Association) Somerset Trojans
17	MF	Zydon Lightbourne	10 February 2010 (age 16)	(Bermuda Football Association) Somerset Trojans
9	FW	Jèon Wolfe	19 April 2010 (age 16)	(Bermuda Football Association) FC Bascome Bermuda
19	FW	Shiia Davis	19 February 2010 (age 16)	(Bermuda Football Association) FC Bascome Bermuda

== Competitive records ==
=== FIFA U-17 World Cup ===
Year	Round	GP	W	D	L	GS	GA	GD
(China) 1985	Did not qualify							
(Canada) 1987	Did not qualify							
(Scotland) 1989	Did not enter							
(Italy) 1991	Withdrew from qualification							
(Japan) 1993	Did not qualify							
(Ecuador) 1995	Disqualified from qualification							
(Egypt) 1997	Did not qualify							
(New Zealand) 1999	Did not qualify							
(Trinidad and Tobago) 2001	Did not qualify							
(Finland) 2003	Did not qualify							
(Peru) 2005	Did not qualify							
(South Korea) 2007	Did not qualify							
(Nigeria) 2009	Did not qualify							
(Mexico) 2011	Did not qualify							
(United Arab Emirates) 2013	Did not qualify							
(Chile) 2015	Did not qualify							
(India) 2017	Did not qualify							
(Brazil) 2019	Did not qualify							
(Indonesia) 2023	Did not qualify							
(Qatar) 2025	Did not qualify							
Total	0/20	0	0	0	0	0	0	0

=== CONCACAF U-17 Championship ===
Year	Round	GP	W	D	L	GS	GA	GD
(Trinidad and Tobago) 1983	Did not qualify							
(Mexico) 1985	Did not qualify							
(Honduras) 1987	Did not enter							
(Trinidad and Tobago) 1988	Did not qualify							
(Trinidad and Tobago) 1991	Did not qualify							
(Cuba) 1992	Disqualified from qualification							
(El Salvador) 1994	Did not qualify							
(Trinidad and Tobago) 1996	Group stage	2	0	0	2	1	13	–12
(Jamaica) (El Salvador) 1999	Did not qualify							
(Honduras) (United States) 2001	Did not qualify							
(Guatemala) (Canada) 2003	Did not qualify							
(Costa Rica) (Mexico) 2005	Did not qualify							
(Honduras) (Jamaica) 2007	Did not qualify							
(Mexico) 2009	Did not qualify							
(Jamaica) 2011	Did not qualify							
(Panama) 2013	Did not qualify							
(Honduras) 2015	Did not qualify							
(Panama) 2017	Did not qualify							
(United States) 2019	Group stage	3	0	0	3	3	12	–9
(Guatemala) 2023	Round of 16	1	0	0	1	0	6	–6
Total	3/20	6	0	0	6	4	31	–27

== See also ==
- Bermuda national football team
- Bermuda national under-20 football team
