= Saint Lucia national under-17 football team =

National association football team

Saint Lucia
- Association: Saint Lucia Football Association
- Confederation: CONCACAF
- Sub-confederation: CFU (Caribbean)
- Home stadium: George Odlum Stadium
- FIFA code: LCA
First colours	Second colours

First international
- Trinidad and Tobago 5-0 Saint Lucia (Port of Spain, Trinidad and Tobago; 12 November 1988)

Biggest win
- Saint Lucia 15-0 U.S. Virgin Islands (Gros Islet, Saint Lucia; 30 August 2002)

Biggest defeat
- Trinidad and Tobago 8-1 Saint Lucia (Macoya, Tunapuna–Piarco, Trinidad and Tobago; 18 August 2004)

World Cup
- Appearances: 0

CONCACAF Under-17 Championship
- Appearances: 2 (first in 1988)
- Best result: Group stage (1988, 2015)

The Saint Lucia U-17 men's national soccer team is the national under-17 association football team of Saint Lucia and is controlled by the Saint Lucia Football Association.

== History ==
=== CONCACAF U-17 Championship record ===
- 1983: Didn't participate
- 1985: Didn't participate
- 1987: Didn't participate
- 1988: Group stage
- 1991: Didn't participate
- 1992: Didn't participate
- 1994: Didn't participate
- 1996: Didn't participate
- 1999: Didn't qualify
- 2001: Didn't qualify
- 2003: Didn't qualify
- 2005: Didn't qualify
- 2007: Didn't qualify
- 2009: Didn't participate
- 2011: Didn't participate
- 2013: Didn't qualify
- 2015: Group stage
- 2017: Didn't qualify
- 2019: Didn't participate
- 2023: Didn't participate

• Tournaments from 1999 to 2007 followed a two group format. No championship game took place, and no standings were given. The top teams in their respective groups qualified, and the second placed teams played in a playoff to decide the final seed. In 2009, the tournament was interrupted due to the swine flu.

=== FIFA U-17 World Cup record ===
- 1985: Did not participate
- 1987: Did not participate
- 1989: Did not qualify
- 1991: Did not participate
- 1993: Did not participate
- 1995: Did not participate
- 1997: Did not participate
- 1999: Did not qualify
- 2001: Did not qualify
- 2003: Did not qualify
- 2005: Did not qualify
- 2007: Did not qualify
- 2009: Did not participate
- 2011: Did not participate
- 2013: Did not qualify
- 2015: Did not qualify
- 2017: Did not qualify
- 2019: Did not participate
- 2023: Did not qualify
- 2025: To be determined
