= Kenzo Riedewald =

Surinamese footballer (born 2007)

Personal information
- Full name: Kenzo Gerold Riedewald
- Date of birth: 24 February 2007 (age 19)
- Place of birth: Almere, Netherlands
- Height: 1.77 m (5 ft 10 in)
- Position: Winger

Team information
- Current team: AZ Alkmaar

Youth career
- FC Almere
- 2016–2018: Utrecht
- BFC Bussum
- Almere City
- Wooter Academy
- 2022–2023: Ajax
- 2023–: AZ Alkmaar

International career^{‡}
| Years | Team | Apps | (Gls) |
| 2023 | Suriname U17 | 3 | (0) |
- ‡ National team caps and goals as of 25 October 2023

Kenzo Gerold Riedewald (born 24 February 2007) is a professional footballer who plays as a winger for Dutch side AZ Alkmaar. Born in the Netherlands, he has represented Suriname at youth international level.

== Club career ==
Born in Almere in the Netherlands, Riedewald's footballing career began with FC Almere, before joining the academy of Utrecht at under-10 level in 2016. He stayed with Utrecht for two years before spending six months with BFC Bussum, where he was scouted by Almere City. Having missed out on game-time with Almere City due to the club not having an under-14 side, he decided to enroll at the Wooter Academy in Amstelveen, also playing for RKAV due to a collaboration between the two academies.

In February 2022 he joined the academy of Ajax, following a week-long trial. After a year with Ajax, Riedewald moved to AZ Alkmaar.

== International career ==
Though born in the Netherlands, Riedewald is of Surinamese descent, while his grandparents are from the Indonesian islands of Java and Banda Neira in the province of Maluku. He was called up to the Suriname under-17 side for the 2023 CONCACAF U-17 Championship, and played in all three games as Suriname were knocked out in the group stages.

== Personal life ==
Riedewald is related to Netherlands international footballer Jaïro Riedewald, but has stated that they are very distant relatives, despite Indonesian media reporting them to be nephew and uncle.
