= CFU Youth Cup =

The CFU Youth Cup (sometimes referred to as the Copa Juvenile) was a competition created by the Caribbean Football Union. It began as an exhibition tournament for under-15 age group national teams created by Jack Warner. In 2006, the CFU, led by Warner decided that it should formally become part of the qualifying campaign for the CONCACAF U-17 Championship tournament and thus under-16 age groups played.

Trinidad and Tobago hosted all three editions, the first two finals were played at Hasely Crawford Stadium and the last was played at the Marvin Lee Stadium in Macoya.

Year	Host	Winner	Runner-up	Third-place	Fourth place	Source
2005; Details	Trinidad and Tobago	Canada	Guatemala	Jamaica	Trinidad and Tobago	
2006; Details	Trinidad and Tobago	Mexico	Haiti	Trinidad and Tobago	Jamaica	
2008; Details	Trinidad and Tobago	Cuba	Trinidad and Tobago	No third place playoff		
