= 2020 CONCACAF U-17 Championship =

Tournament details
- Dates: Cancelled
- Teams: 20 (from 1 confederation)

The 2020 CONCACAF U-17 Championship was originally to be the 7th edition of the CONCACAF U-17 Championship (20th edition if all eras included), the biennial international youth football championship organised by CONCACAF for the under-17 national teams of the North, Central American and Caribbean region. However, on 5 June 2020, CONCACAF announced that the qualifying competition, originally scheduled to be played in 2020, had been postponed indefinitely due to the COVID-19 pandemic.

The top four teams of the tournament would have qualified for the 2021 FIFA U-17 World Cup in Peru as the CONCACAF representatives. However, FIFA announced on 17 November 2020 that this edition of the World Cup would be cancelled. Following this announcement, CONCACAF decided on 4 January 2021 that the 2020 CONCACAF U-17 Championship, which served as the regional qualifiers, would be cancelled.
