= 1999 CONCACAF U-17 Tournament =

Association football tournament for under-17 national teams

1999 CONCACAF U-17 Championship

Tournament details
- Host country: Jamaica & El Salvador
- City: Montego Bay & San Salvador
- Dates: 10 February – 22 May
- Teams: 8 (from 1 confederation)
- Venue(s): 2 (in 2 host cities)

Final positions
- Champions: Mexico
- Runners-up: Jamaica
- Third place: United States
- Fourth place: El Salvador

Tournament statistics
- Matches played: 14
- Goals scored: 55 (3.93 per match)

The 1999 CONCACAF U-17 Tournament was played in Jamaica and El Salvador. The qualification for the 1999 CONCACAF U-17 Tournament took place between September and December 1998.

== Qualifying ==
=== Caribbean Zone ===
==== First round ====
Team 1	Agg.	Team 2	1st leg	2nd leg
Netherlands Antilles	5–2	Aruba	3–1	2–2
Dominica	0–1	Saint Lucia	0–0	0–1

20 September 1998

Netherlands Antilles	3–1	Aruba

27 September 1998

Aruba	2–2	Netherlands Antilles

4 October 1998

Dominica	0–0	Saint Lucia

11 October 1998

Saint Lucia	1–0	Dominica

==== Second round ====
Team 1	Agg.	Team 2	1st leg	2nd leg
Guyana	3-3 (4-5)	Netherlands Antilles	2–1	1–2
Saint Lucia	3–4	Barbados	3–1	0–3
Saint Vincent and the Grenadines	0–2	Bermuda	0–1	0–1

11 October 1998

Guyana	2–1	Netherlands Antilles

18 October 1998

Netherlands Antilles	1–2	Guyana
Penalties
	5–4

18 October 1998

Saint Lucia	3–1	Barbados

25 October 1998

Barbados	3–0	Saint Lucia

25 October 1998

Saint Vincent and the Grenadines	0–1	Bermuda

23 October 1998

Bermuda	1–0	Saint Vincent and the Grenadines

==== Third round ====
Pos	Team	Pld	W	D	L	GF	GA	GD	Pts	Qualification
1	Trinidad and Tobago (H)	3	2	0	1	4	3	+1	6	Final tournament
2	Barbados	3	1	1	1	8	6	+2	4	
3	Bermuda	3	1	1	1	5	3	+2	4	
4	Netherlands Antilles	3	1	0	2	3	8	−5	3	

(H) Hosts
2 December 1998

Netherlands Antilles	2–6	Barbados

2 December 1998

Trinidad and Tobago	0–3	Bermuda

4 December 1998

Bermuda	0–1	Netherlands Antilles

4 December 1998

Barbados	0–2	Trinidad and Tobago

K.Davis, Alister Pascal.

6 December 1998

Bermuda	2–2	Barbados

6 December 1998

Trinidad and Tobago	2–0	Netherlands Antilles

A.Andrews, D.Westfield

=== Central American Zone ===
==== First round ====
Team 1	Agg.	Team 2	1st leg	2nd leg
Panama	0–4	Guatemala	0–2	0–2

11 October 1998

Panama	0–2	Guatemala

18 October 1998

Guatemala	2–0	Panama

==== Second round ====
Team 1	Agg.	Team 2	1st leg	2nd leg
Guatemala	1–2	Honduras	1–1	0–1

6 December 1998

Guatemala	1–1	Honduras

13 December 1998

Honduras	1–0	Guatemala

== Final tournament ==
=== Qualified teams ===
- Canada
- Costa Rica
- El Salvador
- Honduras
- Jamaica
- Mexico
- Trinidad and Tobago
- United States

=== Group stage ===
==== Group A ====
Pos	Team	Pld	W	D	L	GF	GA	GD	Pts	Qualification
1	Jamaica (H)	3	2	1	0	3	0	+3	7	1999 FIFA U-17 World Championship
2	United States	3	1	2	0	5	2	+3	5	Playoff
3	Costa Rica	3	1	1	1	5	5	0	4	
4	Honduras	3	0	0	3	1	7	−6	0	

(H) Hosts
24 February 1999

Costa Rica	2–2	United States

Montego Bay
24 February 1999

Jamaica	1–0	Honduras

Montego Bay

26 February 1999

Honduras	0–3	United States

Montego Bay
26 February 1999

Jamaica	2–0	Costa Rica

Montego Bay

28 February 1999

Costa Rica	3–1	Honduras

Montego Bay
28 February 1999

Jamaica	0–0	United States

Montego Bay

==== Group B ====
Pos	Team	Pld	W	D	L	GF	GA	GD	Pts	Qualification
1	Mexico	3	3	0	0	13	2	+11	9	1999 FIFA U-17 World Championship
2	El Salvador (H)	3	2	0	1	8	4	+4	6	Playoff
3	Canada	3	1	0	2	6	6	0	3	
4	Trinidad and Tobago	3	0	0	3	3	18	−15	0	

(H) Hosts
10 February 1999

El Salvador	6–1	Trinidad and Tobago

Estadio Cuscatlán, San Salvador
10 February 1999

Canada	0–4	Mexico

Estadio Cuscatlán, San Salvador

12 February 1999

Mexico	6–2	Trinidad and Tobago

Estadio Cuscatlán, San Salvador
12 February 1999

El Salvador	2–0	Canada

Estadio Cuscatlán, San Salvador

14 February 1999

Canada	6–0	Trinidad and Tobago
Hume 35', 88'; Obeidat 53'; Cesari 75', 80', 90'

Estadio Cuscatlán, San Salvador
14 February 1999

El Salvador	0–3	Mexico

Estadio Cuscatlán, San Salvador

=== Playoff ===
Team 1	Agg.	Team 2	1st leg	2nd leg
El Salvador	1–10	United States	1–6	0–4

9 May 1999

El Salvador	1–6	United States

San Salvador

22 May 1999

United States	4–0	El Salvador

Columbus
- USA qualified to the 1999 FIFA U-17 World Championship in New Zealand.
