= Suriname national under-17 football team =

National football team

Suriname U-17
- Association: Surinaamse Voetbal Bond
- Confederation: CONCACAF
- Head coach: (Suriname) Aldrin de Baas
- FIFA code: SUR
First colours	Second colours

First international
- Haiti 4–0 Suriname (Delmas, Haiti; 18 August 2004)

Biggest win
- Suriname 8–0 Saint Vincent and the Grenadines (Paramaribo, Suriname; 20 July 2010)

Biggest defeat
- Costa Rica 6–0 Suriname (Bradenton, Florida, United States; 6 May 2019)

FIFA U-17 World Cup
- Appearances: 0

CONCACAF U-17 Championship
- Appearances: 3 (first in 2017)
- Best result: Group stage (2017, 2019, 2023)

The Suriname national under-17 football team is the national under-17 football team of Suriname and is overseen by the Surinaamse Voetbal Bond and its represents Suriname in international Under 17 or youth football competitions.

== Current squad ==
The following players are called up for the 2023 CONCACAF U-17 Championship.

No.	Pos.	Player	Date of birth (age)	Caps	Goals	Club
1	GK	Tyron Chaar	10 August 2007 (age 19)	0	0	(Royal Dutch Football Association) FC Volendam
20	GK	Chanero Bona	28 July 2006 (age 20)	0	0	(Surinamese Football Association) Voorwaarts
2	DF	Jahlani Fonteni	15 May 2006 (age 20)	0	0	(Royal Dutch Football Association) FC Utrecht
4	DF	Yamano Olfers	2 August 2006 (age 20)	0	0	(Royal Dutch Football Association) Telstar
6	DF	Thierry Warso	5 January 2006 (age 20)	0	0	(Surinamese Football Association) Leo Victor
12	DF	Chamylo Kartosontono	3 April 2006 (age 20)	0	0	(Surinamese Football Association) P.V.V.
13	DF	Pharell Rigters	16 December 2006 (age 19)	0	0	(Surinamese Football Association) P.V.V.
14	DF	Ichael Dalfour	19 January 2006 (age 20)	0	0	(Surinamese Football Association) Robinhood
16	DF	Shane Francis	22 June 2006 (age 20)	0	0	(Surinamese Football Association) ABSO
3	MF	D’Angelo Lobman	2 February 2007 (age 19)	0	0	(Royal Dutch Football Association) Ajax
8	MF	Lebron Campagne	16 August 2007 (age 19)	0	0	(Royal Dutch Football Association) FC Utrecht
11	MF	Kenzo Riedewald	24 February 2007 (age 19)	0	0	(Royal Dutch Football Association) Ajax
17	MF	Serfinjo Pinas	14 September 2006 (age 20)	0	0	(Surinamese Football Association) Transvaal
18	MF	Denfinjo Pinas	14 September 2006 (age 20)	0	0	(Surinamese Football Association) Transvaal
5	FW	Rojendro Oudsten	12 November 2007 (age 18)	0	0	(Royal Dutch Football Association) Telstar
7	FW	Sanyika Puljhun	31 July 2007 (age 19)	0	0	(Royal Dutch Football Association) Ajax
9	FW	Jemairo Goodett	27 January 2007 (age 19)	0	0	(Royal Dutch Football Association) Almere City
10	FW	Riguelme Antomoi	19 August 2006 (age 20)	0	0	(Surinamese Football Association) P.V.V.
15	FW	Faraji Amelo	22 May 2006 (age 20)	0	0	(Surinamese Football Association) Transvaal
19	FW	Darell Sijpenhof	18 October 2006 (age 20)	0	0	(Surinamese Football Association) Robinhood

== Fixtures and results ==
legend

Win Draw Loss Fixture

== Competition records ==
=== FIFA U-17 World Cup ===
FIFA U-17 World Cup Record
Hosts / Year	Result	Position	GP	W	D*	L	GS	GA
(China) 1985	Did not qualify							
(Canada) 1987	Did not qualify							
(Scotland) 1989	Did not qualify							
(Italy) 1991	Did not qualify							
(Japan) 1993	Did not qualify							
(Ecuador) 1995	Did not qualify							
(Egypt) 1997	Did not qualify							
(New Zealand) 1999	Did not qualify							
(Trinidad and Tobago) 2001	Did not qualify							
(Finland) 2003	Did not qualify							
(Peru) 2005	Did not qualify							
(South Korea) 2007	Did not qualify							
(Nigeria) 2009	Did not qualify							
(Mexico) 2011	Did not qualify							
(United Arab Emirates) 2013	Did not qualify							
(Chile) 2015	Did not qualify							
(India) 2017	Did not qualify							
(Brazil) 2019	Did not qualify							
(Indonesia) 2023	Did not qualify							
(Qatar) 2025	To be determined							
Total	0/20	-	0	0	0	0	0	0

=== CONCACAF U-17 Championship ===
CONCACAF U-17 Championship Record
Hosts / Year	Result	Position	GP	W	D*	L	GS	GA
(Trinidad and Tobago) 1983 to (Honduras) 2015	Did not qualify							
(Panama) 2017	Group stage	–	3	0	1	2	1	6
(United States) 2019	Group stage	–	3	0	1	2	2	10
(Guatemala) 2023	Group stage	–	3	0	0	3	1	13
Total	3/20	–	9	0	2	7	4	29
