= 1985 CONCACAF U-17 Championship =

Association football tournament for under-17 national teams

Campeonato Sub-16 CONCACAF 1985 (in Spanish)

Tournament details
- Host country: Mexico
- Dates: 13–26 April
- Teams: 9 (from 1 confederation)

Final positions
- Champions: Mexico (1st title)
- Runners-up: Costa Rica
- Third place: Canada
- Fourth place: Honduras

Tournament statistics
- Matches played: 26
- Goals scored: 100 (3.85 per match)

The 1985 CONCACAF U-16 Championship was the second tournament in the Under-16 category organized by the CONCACAF, and it also served as qualifying tournament for the U-16 World Cup to be held at China. Mexico hosted the event between April 13 and 26, and Mexico (as champion) and Costa Rica (as runner-up) won the two spots for China 1985.

== Competition format ==
The first stage consisted of two groups, one with five teams and another with four teams, with the top two teams from each group advancing to the semifinals. In the second round, the champion and runner-up obtained qualification spots for the 1985 FIFA World Youth Championship in China.

== First stage ==
=== Group A ===
Team	GP	W	D	L	GF	GA	GD	Pts
Mexico	4	4	0	0	27	0	+27	8
Honduras	4	3	0	1	11	3	+8	6
Netherlands Antilles	4	2	0	2	7	13	−6	4
Panama	4	1	0	3	4	19	−15	2
Guatemala	4	0	0	4	3	17	−14	0

12 May 1985

Honduras	4–0	Panama
Gayre, Pineda x3	Report

Centro Nacional de Capacitaciones, México City
12 May 1985

Mexico	9–0	Netherlands Antilles
Ledezma x4, Raya x2, Castillo x2, Ramirez	Report

Estadio Azteca, México City

14 May 1985

Honduras	4–1	Guatemala
E.Pineda 43', M.Pineda 68, Urbina 73', Ramirez 80'	Report	Orozco 53' (pen.)

Estadio Ciudad de los Deportes, México City
14 May 1985

Mexico	10–0	Panama
Ledezma 20' 45' 49' 76' 80', Castillo 15' 25' 29', Ortiz 9' 28'	Report

Estadio Ciudad de los Deportes, México City

16 May 1985

Netherlands Antilles	3–1	Panama
Rosina 1' 56', Martina 71'	Report	Ariza

Estadio Ciudad de los Deportes, México City
16 May 1985

Mexico	7–0	Guatemala
Raya 24' 26' 62', Castillo 11', De la Fuente 30', Ortiz 64', Ledezma 66'	Report

Estadio Ciudad de los Deportes, México City

18 May 1985

Netherlands Antilles	3–0	Guatemala
Shurswin 9', Martinus 75', Wensley 76'	Report

Estadio Ciudad de los Deportes, México City
18 May 1985

Mexico	1–0	Honduras
Ledezma 28'	Report

Estadio Ciudad de los Deportes, México City

20 May 1985

Netherlands Antilles	1–3	Honduras
Hoor 40'	Report	Pineda 4' 57'; Rivas 9'

Estadio Jesús Martínez "Palillo", México City
20 May 1985

Panama	3–2	Guatemala
Ariza 10' 67', Barrett 60'	Report	Esposito 44' 76'

Estadio Jesús Martínez "Palillo", México City

=== Group B ===
Team	GP	W	D	L	GF	GA	GD	Pts
Canada	3	2	1	0	10	6	+4	5
Costa Rica	3	1	2	0	7	5	+2	4
Trinidad and Tobago	3	0	2	1	5	8	−3	2
El Salvador	3	0	1	2	6	9	−3	1

13 May 1985

Trinidad and Tobago	3–3	El Salvador
Latapy 16' 70', Lee 30'	Report	N.N. 25', N.N. 37', N.N. 75'

Estadio Jesús Martínez "Palillo", México City
13 May 1985

Canada	3–3	Costa Rica
Vrablic 42', Mobilio 54' 74'	Report	Medford 8' 10, Roses 20'

Estadio Jesús Martínez "Palillo", México City

15 May 1985

Canada	4–1	Trinidad and Tobago
Mobilio 3' 21', Fitzgerald 15', Vrablic 47'	Report	Wayne 5'

Estadio Jesús Martínez "Palillo", México City
15 May 1985

Costa Rica	3–1	El Salvador
Quesada 33' pen 64' pen, Wanchope 46'	Report	Martinez 75'

Estadio Jesús Martínez "Palillo", México City

17 May 1985

Costa Rica	1–1	Trinidad and Tobago
Cordoba	Report	Latapy

Estadio Ciudad de los Deportes, México City
17 May 1985

Canada	3–2	El Salvador
Vrablic, Mobilio x2	Report	?

Estadio Ciudad de los Deportes, México City

== Second stage ==
Pos	Team	Pld	W	D	L	GF	GA	GD	Pts	Qualification
1	Mexico	3	2	1	0	10	1	+9	5	Qualified to 1985 FIFA U-16 World Championship
2	Costa Rica	3	2	1	0	6	3	+3	5	Qualified to 1985 FIFA U-16 World Championship
3	Canada	3	0	1	2	2	6	−4	1	
4	Honduras	3	0	1	2	2	10	−8	1	

22 May 1985	Costa Rica	3–1	Honduras	Mexico City, Mexico
	Medford; Ramírez; Rosses			Stadium: Estadio Ciudad de los Deportes

22 May 1985	Mexico	3–0	Canada	Mexico City, Mexico
	Ortiz; Castillo; Raya			Stadium: Estadio Ciudad de los Deportes

24 May 1985	Costa Rica	2–1	Canada	Mexico City, Mexico
				Stadium: Estadio Ciudad de los Deportes

24 May 1985	Mexico	6–0	Honduras	Mexico City, Mexico
				Stadium: Estadio Ciudad de los Deportes

26 May 1985	Canada	1–1	Honduras	Mexico City, Mexico
				Stadium: Estadio Jesús Martínez "Palillo"

26 May 1985	Mexico	1–1	Costa Rica	Mexico City, Mexico
				Stadium: Estadio Jesús Martínez "Palillo"

Mexico and Costa Rica qualified to the 1985 FIFA U-16 World Championship in China.

USA also qualified by way of winning the 1983 CONCACAF U-17 Championship
