= Honduras national under-17 football team =

National association football team

Honduras U-17
- Nickname(s): La mini H Sub'17
- Association: FENAFUTH
- Confederation: CONCACAF
- Head coach: Israel Canales
- FIFA code: HON
First colours	Second colours

First international
- Honduras 0–4 Mexico (August 26, 1986 in Trinidad & Tobago)

Biggest win
- Belize 0–9 Honduras (November 18, 2008 in Panama)

Biggest defeat
- Honduras 0–7 United States (November 14, 1998 in Trinidad & Tobago) Honduras 0-7 Brazil (November 4, 2025 in Qatar)

FIFA U-17 World Cup
- Appearances: 7 (first in 2007)
- Best result: Quarter-finals (2013)

CONCACAF Under-17 Championship
- Appearances: 19 (first in 1983)
- Best result: Runners-up (2015)

The Honduras national under-17 football team represents Honduras in tournaments and friendly matches at the Under-17 level. They have qualified five times for FIFA U-17 World Cup, with their best performance being in 2013, where they reached the quarter-finals.

== Tournament history ==
=== FIFA U-17 World Cup ===
FIFA U-17 World Cup
Year	Result	P	W	T	L	F	A	D	Pts
(China) 1985 ↓ (Peru) 2005	Did not qualify								
(South Korea) 2007	Group stage	3	0	0	3	3	10	−7	0
(Nigeria) 2009	Group stage	3	0	0	3	1	5	−4	0
(Mexico) 2011	Did not qualify								
(United Arab Emirates) 2013	Quarter-finals	5	2	1	2	6	8	−2	7
(Chile) 2015	Quarter-finals	3	0	0	3	2	8	−6	0
(India) 2017	Round of 16	4	1	0	3	7	14	−7	3
(Brazil) 2019	Did not qualify								
(Indonesia) 2023	Did not qualify								
(Qatar) 2025	Group stage	3	0	0	3	3	14	−11	0
(Qatar) 2026	In progress	1	0	0	1	0	2	-2	0
Total:7/21	Quarter-finals	22	3	1	18	22	61	−39	10

=== CONCACAF U-17 championship record ===
CONCACAF U-16/17 Championship
Year	P	W	T	L	F	A	D	Pts	Finish
(Trinidad and Tobago) 1983	4	1	0	3	1	7	–6	2	4th
(Mexico) 1985	7	3	0	4	13	14	–1	6	4th
(Honduras) 1987	5	1	1	3	7	17	–10	3	4th
(Trinidad and Tobago) 1988	4	2	1	1	6	9	–3	5	Group stage
(Trinidad and Tobago) 1991	3	0	3	0	1	1	0	3	Group stage
(Cuba) 1992	3	1	0	2	2	3	–1	2	Group stage
(El Salvador) 1994	3	1	0	2	5	11	–6	3	Group stage
(Trinidad and Tobago) 1996	2	0	0	2	0	4	–4	0	Group stage
(El Salvador) (Jamaica) 1999	3	0	0	3	1	7	–6	0	Group stage
(Honduras) (United States) 2001	3	0	2	1	3	4	–1	2	Group stage
(Canada) (Guatemala) 2003	Did not qualify								
(Costa Rica) (Mexico) 2005	5	1	2	2	5	7	–2	5	4th
(Honduras) (Jamaica) 2007	3	1	2	0	2	1	+1	5	Group stage
(Mexico) 2009	3	1	1	1	7	4	+3	4	Group stage
(Jamaica) 2011	3	1	1	1	3	3	0	4	Quarter-finals
(Panama) 2013	5	2	1	2	9	8	+1	7	4th
(Honduras) 2015	6	3	2	1	9	7	+2	11	Runners-up
(Panama) 2017	9	5	0	4	22	16	+6	15	Classification stage
(United States) 2019	5	2	1	2	9	6	+3	7	Quarter-finals
(Guatemala) 2023	5	4	0	1	18	4	+14	12	Quarter-finals
Totals	81	29	17	35	123	133	−10	96	—

== Fixtures and results ==
Date	Tournament	Location	Home team	Score	Away team	Scorers

== Current squad ==
The following 21 players were selected for the most recent fixtures in the 2026 CONCACAF U-17 World Cup qualification.

Head coach: Merling Paz

No.	Pos.	Player	Date of birth (age)	Club
1	GK	Raúl Villatoro	19 February 2009 (age 17)	(National Autonomous Federation of Football of Honduras) Génesis
12	GK	Juan Quesada	8 March 2009 (age 17)	(National Autonomous Federation of Football of Honduras) UPNFM
21	GK	Nelson Palomo	8 February 2010 (age 16)	(National Autonomous Federation of Football of Honduras) Génesis
5	DF	Fabián Ramos	22 April 2009 (age 17)	(National Autonomous Federation of Football of Honduras) Motagua
15	DF	Jonathan Claros	25 January 2009 (age 17)	(National Autonomous Federation of Football of Honduras) Olimpia
3	DF	Denzel Arzú (captain)	27 January 2009 (age 17)	(National Autonomous Federation of Football of Honduras) Olimpia
4	DF	Jefferson Guiti	19 June 2009 (age 17)	(National Autonomous Federation of Football of Honduras) Marathón
20	DF	Nelson Castillo	14 May 2010 (age 16)	(National Autonomous Federation of Football of Honduras) Real España
2	DF	Kevin Pérez	2 April 2009 (age 17)	(National Autonomous Federation of Football of Honduras) Génesis
6	MF	Leandro Padilla	21 October 2009 (age 17)	(United States Soccer Federation) Inter Miami C.F.
8	MF	Yeiron Arzú	11 March 2009 (age 17)	(National Autonomous Federation of Football of Honduras) Platense
10	MF	Josué Ortega	23 March 2009 (age 17)	(National Autonomous Federation of Football of Honduras) Motagua
14	MF	Ángel Maradiaga	31 January 2009 (age 17)	(National Autonomous Federation of Football of Honduras) UPNFM
17	MF	Darwin Cruz	3 May 2010 (age 16)	(National Autonomous Federation of Football of Honduras) AFFI Academia
18	MF	Heiner Reyes	16 April 2009 (age 17)	(National Autonomous Federation of Football of Honduras) Olimpia
13	MF	Miguel Castillo	26 November 2009 (age 16)	(National Autonomous Federation of Football of Honduras) UPNFM
11	FW	Mike Arana	22 January 2009 (age 17)	(National Autonomous Federation of Football of Honduras) Real España
7	FW	Eduardo Romero	10 April 2009 (age 17)	(National Autonomous Federation of Football of Honduras) Olimpia
9	FW	Milton Moya	24 February 2009 (age 17)	(National Autonomous Federation of Football of Honduras) Real España
16	FW	Charly Chávez	24 January 2009 (age 17)	(National Autonomous Federation of Football of Honduras) C.D. Victoria
19	FW	Jeremy Rodríguez	19 August 2009 (age 17)	(National Autonomous Federation of Football of Honduras) Olimpia

== Head-to-head record ==
The following table shows Honduras' head-to-head record in the FIFA U-17 World Cup.

Opponent	Pld	W	D	L	GF	GA	GD	Win %
Argentina	2	0	0	2	1	5	−4	0.00
Belgium	1	0	0	1	1	2	−1	0.00
Brazil	2	0	0	2	0	6	−6	0.00
Ecuador	1	0	0	1	1	3	−2	0.00
France	1	0	0	1	1	5	−4	0.00
Germany	1	0	0	1	1	3	−2	0.00
Japan	1	0	0	1	1	6	−5	0.00
Mali	1	0	0	1	0	3	−3	0.00
New Caledonia	1	1	0	0	5	0	+5	100.00
Nigeria	1	0	0	1	0	1	−1	0.00
Slovakia	1	0	1	0	2	2	+0	0.00
Spain	1	0	0	1	2	4	−2	0.00
Sweden	1	0	0	1	1	2	−1	0.00
Syria	1	0	0	1	0	2	−2	0.00
United Arab Emirates	1	1	0	0	2	1	+1	100.00
Uzbekistan	1	1	0	0	1	0	+1	100.00
Total	18	3	1	14	19	45	−26	16.67

== Honours ==
- CONCACAF Under-17 Championship
  - Runners-up (1): 2015

== Managers ==
- Luis "Piña" López (1983)
- Quique Grey (1985)
- Mario Griffin Cubas (1987)
- Carlos Padilla Velásquez (1988)
- Ricardo Taylor (1991)
- José Raúl Ortiz (1992 and 1994)
- Carlos Cruz Carranza (1996)
- Hermelindo Cantarero (1998-1999)
- Óscar "Cocli" Salgado (2000)
- Dennis Marlon Allen (2001)
- Carlos Ramón Tábora (2002)
- Miguel Ángel Escalante (2004 and 2005)
- Óscar "Cocli" Salgado (2006)
- Miguel Ángel Escalante (2007)
- Jorge Jiménez (2008)
- Emilio Umanzor (2008-2011)
- Jose Aleman (2011)
- Jose Valladares (2012-2019)
- Luis Alvarado (2019-2021)
- Israel Canales (2021-present)
