= 1996 CONCACAF U-17 Championship =

Association football tournament for under-17 national teams

Campeonato Sub-17 CONCACAF 1996 (in Spanish)

Tournament details
- Host country: Trinidad and Tobago
- Dates: 18–31 August
- Teams: 12 (from 1 confederation)
- Venue(s): 1 (in 1 host city)

Final positions
- Champions: Mexico
- Runners-up: United States
- Third place: Costa Rica
- Fourth place: Canada

Tournament statistics
- Matches played: 22
- Goals scored: 83 (3.77 per match)

The 1996 CONCACAF U-17 Tournament determined the three CONCACAF representatives that qualified to the 1997 FIFA U-17 World Championship in Egypt. Trinidad and Tobago hosted the championships between 18–31 August.

== Qualified teams ==
- Bermuda
- Canada
- Costa Rica
- Dominican Republic
- El Salvador
- Guatemala
- Honduras
- Martinique
- Mexico
- Netherlands Antilles
- Trinidad and Tobago (host)
- United States

== First round ==
=== Group 1 ===
| Pos | Team | Pld | W | D | L | GF | GA | GD | Pts | Qualification |
|---|---|---|---|---|---|---|---|---|---|---|
| 1 | Costa Rica | 3 | 3 | 0 | 0 | 13 | 4 | +9 | 9 | Qualified to the Final round |
| 2 | United States | 3 | 2 | 0 | 1 | 10 | 3 | +7 | 6 | Qualified to the Final round |
| 3 | Dominican Republic | 2 | 0 | 0 | 2 | 1 | 5 | −4 | 0 | Eliminated |
| 4 | Bermuda | 2 | 0 | 0 | 2 | 1 | 13 | −12 | 0 | Eliminated |

| 18 August 1996 | Bermuda | 0 – 5 | United States | Port of Spain, Trinidad and Tobago |

| 18 August 1996 | Costa Rica | 2 – 1 | Dominican Republic | Port of Spain, Trinidad and Tobago |

| 20 August 1996 | Bermuda | 1 – 8 | Costa Rica | Port of Spain, Trinidad and Tobago |

| 20 August 1996 | Dominican Republic | 0 – 3 | United States | Port of Spain, Trinidad and Tobago |

| 22 August 1996 | Bermuda | not played | Dominican Republic | Port of Spain, Trinidad and Tobago |

| 22 August 1996 | Costa Rica | 3 – 2 | United States | Port of Spain, Trinidad and Tobago |

=== Group 2 ===
| Pos | Team | Pld | W | D | L | GF | GA | GD | Pts | Qualification |
|---|---|---|---|---|---|---|---|---|---|---|
| 1 | Mexico | 3 | 3 | 0 | 0 | 15 | 1 | +14 | 9 | Qualified to the Final round |
| 2 | Guatemala | 3 | 2 | 0 | 1 | 5 | 5 | 0 | 6 | Eliminated |
| 3 | Honduras | 2 | 0 | 0 | 2 | 0 | 4 | −4 | 0 | Eliminated |
| 4 | Martinique | 2 | 0 | 0 | 2 | 0 | 10 | −10 | 0 | Eliminated |

| 18 August 1996 | Guatemala | 3 – 0 | Martinique | Port of Spain, Trinidad and Tobago |

| 18 August 1996 | Honduras | 0 – 3 | Mexico | Port of Spain, Trinidad and Tobago |

| 20 August 1996 | Guatemala | 1 – 0 | Honduras | Port of Spain, Trinidad and Tobago |

| 20 August 1996 | Martinique | 0 – 7 | Mexico | Port of Spain, Trinidad and Tobago |

| 22 August 1996 | Honduras | not played | Martinique | Port of Spain, Trinidad and Tobago |

| 22 August 1996 | Guatemala | 1 – 5 | Mexico | Port of Spain, Trinidad and Tobago |

=== Group 3 ===
| Pos | Team | Pld | W | D | L | GF | GA | GD | Pts | Qualification |
|---|---|---|---|---|---|---|---|---|---|---|
| 1 | Canada | 3 | 2 | 1 | 0 | 6 | 2 | +4 | 7 | Qualified to the Final round |
| 2 | Trinidad and Tobago | 3 | 1 | 2 | 0 | 7 | 2 | +5 | 5 | Eliminated |
| 3 | El Salvador | 3 | 1 | 1 | 1 | 6 | 4 | +2 | 4 | Eliminated |
| 4 | Netherlands Antilles | 3 | 0 | 0 | 3 | 2 | 13 | −11 | 0 | Eliminated |

| 18 August 1996 | Trinidad and Tobago | 5 – 0 | Netherlands Antilles | Port of Spain, Trinidad and Tobago |

| 18 August 1996 | Canada | 2 – 0 | El Salvador | Port of Spain, Trinidad and Tobago |

| 20 August 1996 | Canada | 3 – 1 | Netherlands Antilles | Port of Spain, Trinidad and Tobago |

| 20 August 1996 | Trinidad and Tobago | 1 – 1 | El Salvador | Port of Spain, Trinidad and Tobago |

| 22 August 1996 | El Salvador | 5 – 1 | Netherlands Antilles | Port of Spain, Trinidad and Tobago |

| 22 August 1996 | Trinidad and Tobago | 1 – 1 | Canada | Port of Spain, Trinidad and Tobago |

== Final round ==
Costa Rica, Mexico, and Canada qualified to the Final round as group winners, USA joined as best second place.

| Pos | Team | Pld | W | D | L | GF | GA | GD | Pts | Qualification |
|---|---|---|---|---|---|---|---|---|---|---|
| 1 | Mexico | 3 | 3 | 0 | 0 | 8 | 1 | +7 | 9 | Qualified to 1997 FIFA U-17 World Championship |
| 2 | United States | 3 | 1 | 1 | 1 | 4 | 4 | 0 | 4 | Qualified to 1997 FIFA U-17 World Championship |
| 3 | Costa Rica | 3 | 1 | 1 | 1 | 4 | 6 | −2 | 4 | Qualified to 1997 FIFA U-17 World Championship |
| 4 | Canada | 3 | 0 | 0 | 3 | 1 | 6 | −5 | 0 | Eliminated |

| 26 August 1996 | Canada | 1 – 3 | Costa Rica | Port of Spain, Trinidad and Tobago |

| 26 August 1996 | Mexico | 3 – 1 | United States | Port of Spain, Trinidad and Tobago |

| 28 August 1996 | Costa Rica | 0 – 4 | Mexico | Port of Spain, Trinidad and Tobago |

| 28 August 1996 | Canada | 0 – 2 | United States | Port of Spain, Trinidad and Tobago |

| 30 August 1996 | Canada | 0 – 1 | Mexico | Port of Spain, Trinidad and Tobago |

| 30 August 1996 | Costa Rica | 1 – 1 | United States | Port of Spain, Trinidad and Tobago |
