= 1988 CONCACAF U-16 Tournament =

Association football tournament for under-17 national teams

1988 CONCACAF U-16 Championship
Tournament details
- Host country: Trinidad and Tobago
- Dates: 12–27 November
- Teams: 10 (from 1 confederation)
- Venue(s): 2 (in 2 host cities)

Final positions
- Champions: Cuba (1st title)
- Runners-up: United States
- Third place: Canada
- Fourth place: Trinidad and Tobago

Tournament statistics
- Matches played: 26
- Goals scored: 59 (2.27 per match)

The 1988 CONCACAF U-16 Championship was a North American international association football tournament, it determined the 1989 FIFA U-16 World Championship entrants from the CONCACAF region. The 1988 edition of the competition was held in Trinidad and Tobago.

== First round ==
=== Group A ===
| Team | Pld | W | D | L | GF | GA | Pts |
|---|---|---|---|---|---|---|---|
| Trinidad & Tobago | 4 | 4 | 0 | 0 | 8 | 0 | 8 |
| USA | 4 | 3 | 0 | 1 | 19 | 2 | 6 |
| Honduras | 4 | 2 | 0 | 2 | 5 | 9 | 4 |
| Guatemala | 4 | 0 | 1 | 3 | 2 | 9 | 1 |
| Saint Lucia | 4 | 0 | 1 | 3 | 2 | 16 | 1 |

12 November 1988

| Guatemala | 1-6 | United States |

Port of Spain
12 November 1988

| Trinidad and Tobago | 5-0 | Saint Lucia |

Port of Spain
14 November 1988

| Guatemala | 1-1 | Saint Lucia |

Port of Spain
14 November 1988

| United States | 7-0 | Honduras |

Port of Spain
16 November 1988

| Honduras | 4-1 | Saint Lucia |

Port of Spain
16 November 1988

| Trinidad and Tobago | 1-0 | Guatemala |

Port of Spain
18 November 1988

| Saint Lucia | 0-6 | United States |

Port of Spain
18 November 1988

| Trinidad and Tobago | 1-0 | Honduras |

Port of Spain
20 November 1988

| Guatemala | 0-1 | Honduras |

Port of Spain
20 November 1988

| Trinidad and Tobago | 1-0 | United States |

Port of Spain

=== Group B ===
| Team | Pld | W | D | L | GF | GA | Pts |
|---|---|---|---|---|---|---|---|
| Canada | 4 | 2 | 2 | 0 | 5 | 2 | 6 |
| Cuba | 4 | 2 | 2 | 0 | 3 | 0 | 6 |
| Jamaica | 4 | 1 | 3 | 0 | 1 | 0 | 5 |
| Costa Rica | 4 | 1 | 0 | 3 | 3 | 5 | 2 |
| El Salvador | 4 | 0 | 1 | 3 | 1 | 6 | 1 |

13 November 1988

| Costa Rica | 0-2 | Cuba |

San Fernando
13 November 1988

| Canada | 3-1 | El Salvador |

San Fernando
15 November 1988

| Cuba | 0-0 | Jamaica |

San Fernando
15 November 1988

| Costa Rica | 1-2 | Canada |

San Fernando
16 November 1988

| Jamaica | 0-0 | Canada |

San Fernando
16 November 1988

| El Salvador | 0-2 | Costa Rica |

San Fernando
19 November 1988

| Jamaica | 0-0 | El Salvador |

San Fernando
19 November 1988

| Cuba | 0-0 | Canada |

San Fernando
21 November 1988

| El Salvador | 0-1 | Cuba |

San Fernando
21 November 1988

| Jamaica | 1-0 | Costa Rica |

San Fernando

== Final Group ==
| Team | Pld | W | D | L | GF | GA | Pts |
|---|---|---|---|---|---|---|---|
| Cuba | 3 | 2 | 0 | 1 | 5 | 1 | 4 |
| USA | 3 | 2 | 0 | 1 | 3 | 2 | 4 |
| Canada | 3 | 1 | 1 | 1 | 2 | 5 | 3 |
| Trinidad & Tobago | 3 | 0 | 1 | 2 | 0 | 2 | 1 |

23 November 1988

| United States | 1-2 | Canada |

Port of Spain
23 November 1988

| Trinidad and Tobago | 0-1 | Cuba |

Port of Spain
25 November 1988

| United States | 1-0 | Cuba |

Port of Spain
25 November 1988

| Trinidad and Tobago | 0-0 | Canada |

Port of Spain
27 November 1988

| Canada | 0-4 | Cuba |

Port of Spain
27 November 1988

| Trinidad and Tobago | 0-1 | United States |

Port of Spain

Canada, Cuba and USA qualified to the 1989 FIFA U-16 World Championship in Scotland.
