= 1987 CONCACAF U-17 Championship =

Association football tournament for under-17 national teams

1987 CONCACAF U-16 Championship
Tournament details
- Host country: Honduras
- Dates: 15–26 February
- Teams: 7 (from 1 confederation)

Final positions
- Champions: Mexico (2nd title)
- Runners-up: United States
- Third place: Costa Rica
- Fourth place: Honduras

Tournament statistics
- Matches played: 15
- Goals scored: 47 (3.13 per match)

The 1987 CONCACAF U-16 Championship was a North American international association football tournament, it determined the 1987 FIFA U-16 World Championship entrants from the CONCACAF region. The 1987 edition of the competition was held in Honduras.

== First round ==
=== Group A ===
Pos	Team	Pld	W	D	L	GF	GA	GD	Pts	Qualification
1	United States	2	2	0	0	6	1	+5	4	Final Group
2	Honduras	2	1	0	1	4	4	0	2	Final Group
3	Trinidad and Tobago	2	0	0	2	2	7	−5	0	

Rules for classification: 1) Points; 2) Goal difference; 3) Goals scored.
15 February 1987

United States	4–0	Trinidad and Tobago

Estadio Nacional Chelato Uclés, Tegucigalpa
17 February 1987

Honduras	3–2	Trinidad and Tobago

Estadio Nacional Chelato Uclés, Tegucigalpa
19 February 1987

Honduras	1–2	United States

Estadio Nacional Chelato Uclés, Tegucigalpa

=== Group B ===
Pos	Team	Pld	W	D	L	GF	GA	GD	Pts	Qualification
1	Mexico	3	3	0	0	7	1	+6	6	Final Group
2	Costa Rica	3	2	0	1	4	5	−1	4	Final Group
3	Jamaica	3	0	1	2	0	2	−2	1	
4	El Salvador	3	0	1	2	0	3	−3	1	

First match(es) will be played: unknown. Source:
Rules for classification: 1) Points; 2) Goal difference; 3) Goals scored.
15 February 1987

Mexico	1–0	Jamaica

Estadio Francisco Morazán, San Pedro Sula
16 February 1987

El Salvador	0–2	Costa Rica

Estadio Francisco Morazán, San Pedro Sula

18 February 1987

El Salvador	0–1	Mexico

Estadio Francisco Morazán, San Pedro Sula
18 February 1987

Costa Rica	1–0	Jamaica

Estadio Francisco Morazán, San Pedro Sula

20 February 1987

El Salvador	0–0	Jamaica

Estadio Francisco Morazán, San Pedro Sula
20 February 1987

Costa Rica	1–5	Mexico

Estadio Francisco Morazán, San Pedro Sula

== Final Group ==
Pos	Team	Pld	W	D	L	GF	GA	GD	Pts	Qualification
1	Mexico	3	3	0	0	9	1	+8	6	1987 FIFA U-16 World Championship
2	United States	3	2	0	1	7	6	+1	4	1987 FIFA U-16 World Championship
3	Costa Rica	3	1	0	2	5	4	+1	2	
4	Honduras	3	0	0	3	3	13	−10	0	

First match(es) will be played: unknown. Source:
Rules for classification: 1) Points; 2) Goal difference; 3) Goals scored.
22 February 1987

Mexico	3–1	United States

Estadio Nacional Chelato Uclés, Tegucigalpa
22 February 1987

Honduras	0–5	Costa Rica

Estadio Nacional Chelato Uclés, Tegucigalpa
24 February 1987

Costa Rica	0–2	Mexico

Estadio Nacional Chelato Uclés, Tegucigalpa
24 February 1987

Honduras	3–4	United States

Estadio Nacional Chelato Uclés, Tegucigalpa
26 February 1987

Costa Rica	0–2	United States

Estadio Nacional Chelato Uclés, Tegucigalpa
26 February 1987

Honduras	0–4	Mexico

Estadio Nacional Chelato Uclés, Tegucigalpa

Mexico and USA qualified to the 1987 FIFA U-16 World Championship in Canada.
