= 2003 CONCACAF U-17 Tournament =

Association football tournament for under-17 national teams

2003 CONCACAF U-17 Championship Tournoi d'Amérique du Nord, centrale et Caraïbe de football des moins de 17 ans 2003

Tournament details
- Host country: Guatemala/Canada
- City: Guatemala City/Victoria
- Dates: March 3–30
- Teams: 8 (from 1 confederation)
- Venue: 2 (in 2 host cities)

Final positions
- Champions: United States
- Runners-up: Costa Rica
- Third place: Mexico
- Fourth place: Jamaica

Tournament statistics
- Matches played: 14
- Goals scored: 45 (3.21 per match)

== Group A ==
5 March 2003

Jamaica	0 - 3	United States

Guatemala City
5 March 2003

Guatemala	2 - 2	El Salvador

Guatemala City

7 March 2003

El Salvador	1 - 1	United States

Guatemala City
7 March 2003

Guatemala	2 - 3	Jamaica

Guatemala City

9 March 2003

El Salvador	1 - 1	Jamaica

Guatemala City
9 March 2003

Guatemala	0 - 3	United States

Guatemala City

=== Standings ===
#	Team	P	W	D	L	F	A	PTS	+/-
1	United States	3	2	1	0	7	1	7	+6
2	Jamaica	3	1	1	1	4	6	4	-2
3	El Salvador	3	0	3	0	4	4	3	0
4	Guatemala	3	0	1	2	4	8	1	-4

- United States qualified to the 2003 FIFA U-17 World Championship in Finland.

== Group B ==
26 March 2003

Costa Rica	4 - 1	Mexico

Victoria
26 March 2003

Canada	3 - 1	Cuba
Wilson 2', 17'; Rios 48'		Gonzales 4'

Victoria

28 March 2003

Cuba	0 - 3	Mexico

Victoria
28 March 2003

Canada	1 - 0	Costa Rica
Wilson 28'

Victoria

30 March 2003

Costa Rica	3 - 1	Cuba

Victoria
30 March 2003

Canada	0 - 2	Mexico

Victoria

=== Standings ===
#	Team	P	W	D	L	F	A	PTS	+/-
1	Costa Rica	3	2	0	1	7	3	6	+4
2	Mexico	3	2	0	1	6	4	6	+2
3	Canada	3	2	0	1	4	3	6	+1
4	Cuba	3	0	0	3	2	9	0	-7

- Costa Rica qualified to the 2003 FIFA U-17 World Championship in Finland.

== Playoffs ==
13 April 2003

Jamaica	0 - 2	Mexico

Kingston

26 April 2003

Mexico	5 - 0	Jamaica

Mexico City
- Mexico qualified to the 2003 FIFA U-17 World Championship in Finland.

== See also ==
- CONCACAF U17 Tournament
- FIFA U-17 World Cup
