= 1992 CONCACAF U-17 Tournament =

Association football tournament for under-17 national teams

Tournament details
- Host country: Cuba
- City: Havana
- Dates: 12–23 August
- Teams: 12
- Venue(s): (in 1 host city)

Final positions
- Champions: United States (2nd title)
- Runners-up: Mexico
- Third place: Canada
- Fourth place: Cuba

Tournament statistics
- Matches played: 24
- Goals scored: 95 (3.96 per match)

The 1992 CONCACAF U-16 Tournament was a North American international association football tournament, it determined the 1993 FIFA U-17 World Championship entrants from the CONCACAF region. The 1992 edition of the competition was held in Cuba.

== Group A ==
Team	Pld	W	D	L	GF	GA	Pts
Canada	3	3	0	0	16	0	6
Cuba	3	2	0	1	10	2	4
Panama	3	1	0	2	6	12	2
Cayman Islands	3	0	0	3	0	18	0

12 August 1992

Cuba	4-0	Panama

La Habana
12 August 1992

Cayman Islands	0-6	Canada

La Habana
14 August 1992

Cuba	0-2	Canada

La Habana
14 August 1992

Panama	6-0	Cayman Islands

La Habana
16 August 1992

Cuba	6-0	Cayman Islands

La Habana
16 August 1992

Canada	8-0	Panama

La Habana

== Group B ==
Team	Pld	W	D	L	GF	GA	Pts
Mexico	3	3	0	0	16	2	6
Costa Rica	3	2	0	1	8	3	4
Jamaica	3	1	0	2	10	3	2
Aruba	3	0	0	3	1	27	0

13 August 1992

Aruba	1-10	Jamaica

La Habana
13 August 1992

Mexico	3-2	Costa Rica

La Habana
15 August 1992

Jamaica	0-1	Mexico

La Habana
15 August 1992

Costa Rica	5-0	Aruba

La Habana
17 August 1992

Jamaica	0-1	Costa Rica

La Habana
17 August 1992

Mexico	12-0	Aruba

La Habana

== Group C ==
Team	Pld	W	D	L	GF	GA	Pts
United States	3	3	0	0	9	1	6
Guatemala	3	2	0	1	2	3	4
Honduras	3	1	0	2	2	3	2
Netherlands Antilles	3	0	0	3	0	6	0

12 August 1992

Netherlands Antilles	0-1	Guatemala

La Habana
12 August 1992

United States	2-1	Honduras

La Habana
14 August 1992

Honduras	1-0	Netherlands Antilles

La Habana
14 August 1992

United States	3-0	Guatemala

La Habana
16 August 1992

Guatemala	1-0	Honduras

La Habana
16 August 1992

United States	4-0	Netherlands Antilles

La Habana

== Final round ==
Team	Pld	W	D	L	GF	GA	Pts
United States	3	2	0	1	6	4	6
Mexico	3	1	2	0	5	4	5
Canada	3	1	1	1	3	1	4
Cuba	3	0	1	2	1	6	1

19 August 1992

Cuba	0-3	Canada

La Habana
19 August 1992

Mexico	4-3	United States

La Habana
21 August 1992

Canada	0-1	United States

La Habana
21 August 1992

Cuba	1-1	Mexico

La Habana
23 August 1992

Mexico	0-0	Canada

La Habana
23 August 1992

Cuba	0-2	United States

La Habana

Canada, Mexico and USA qualified to the 1993 FIFA U-17 World Championship in Japan.
