= 1991 CONCACAF U-17 Tournament =

Association football tournament for under-17 national teams

Tournament details
- Host country: Trinidad and Tobago
- City: Port of Spain
- Dates: 24 March – 4 April
- Teams: 12
- Venue(s): (in 1 host city)

Final positions
- Champions: Mexico
- Runners-up: United States
- Third place: Cuba
- Fourth place: Trinidad and Tobago

Tournament statistics
- Matches played: 24
- Goals scored: 55 (2.29 per match)

The 1991 CONCACAF U-17 Championship was a North American international association football tournament, it determined the 1991 FIFA U-17 World Championship entrants from the CONCACAF region. The 1991 edition of the competition was held in Trinidad and Tobago, the second consecutive tournament to be held on the twin island nation.

== First round ==
=== Group 1 ===
Team	Pld	W	D	L	GF	GA	Pts
Mexico	3	1	2	0	4	1	4
Jamaica	3	1	2	0	3	1	4
Honduras	3	0	3	0	1	1	3
Guatemala	3	0	1	2	1	6	1

24 March 1991

Honduras	0-0	Guatemala

Port of Spain
24 March 1991

Mexico	0-0	Jamaica

Port of Spain
26 March 1991

Honduras	1-1	Mexico

Port of Spain
26 March 1991

Jamaica	3-1	Guatemala

Port of Spain
28 March 1991

Jamaica	0-0	Honduras

Port of Spain
29 March 1991

Mexico	3-0	Guatemala

Port of Spain

=== Group 2 ===
Team	Pld	W	D	L	GF	GA	Pts
United States	3	2	1	0	12	1	5
Cuba	3	2	1	0	8	1	5
El Salvador	3	1	0	2	2	8	2
Puerto Rico	3	0	0	3	0	12	0

24 March 1991

Cuba	4-0	Puerto Rico

Port of Spain
24 March 1991

United States	5-0	El Salvador

Port of Spain
26 March 1991

Cuba	3-0	El Salvador

Port of Spain
26 March 1991

Puerto Rico	0-6	United States

Port of Spain
28 March 1991

El Salvador	2-0	Puerto Rico

Port of Spain
28 March 1991

United States	1-1	Cuba

Port of Spain

=== Group 3 ===
Team	Pld	W	D	L	GF	GA	Pts
Trinidad and Tobago	3	3	0	0	9	2	6
Canada	3	1	1	1	1	1	3
Panama	3	1	0	2	4	7	2
Netherlands Antilles	3	0	1	2	1	5	1

23 March 1991

Canada	1-0	Panama

Port of Spain
23 March 1991

Trinidad and Tobago	3-0	Netherlands Antilles

Port of Spain
25 March 1991

Netherlands Antilles	0-0	Canada

Port of Spain
25 March 1991

Panama	2-5	Trinidad and Tobago

Port of Spain
27 March 1991

Netherlands Antilles	1-2	Panama

Port of Spain
27 March 1991

Trinidad and Tobago	1-0	Canada

Port of Spain

== Final round ==
Team	Pld	W	D	L	GF	GA	Pts
Mexico	3	2	1	0	4	1	5
United States	3	1	2	0	3	2	4
Cuba	3	1	0	2	1	2	2
Trinidad and Tobago	3	0	1	2	1	4	1

31 March 1991

Cuba	0-1	Mexico

Port of Spain
31 March 1991

United States	1-1	Trinidad and Tobago

Port of Spain
2 April 1991

Cuba	0-1	United States

Port of Spain
2 April 1991

Trinidad and Tobago	0-2	Mexico

Port of Spain
4 April 1991

Mexico	1-1	United States

Port of Spain
4 April 1991

Trinidad and Tobago	0-1	Cuba

Port of Spain

Cuba, Mexico and USA qualified to the 1991 FIFA U-17 World Championship in Italy.
