= 1983 CONCACAF U-17 Championship =

Association football tournament for under-17 national teams

Campeonato Sub-17 CONCACAF 1983 (in Spanish)

Tournament details
- Host country: Trinidad and Tobago
- City: Port of Spain
- Dates: 26 August – 3 September
- Teams: 6 (from 1 confederation)

Final positions
- Champions: United States (1st title)
- Runners-up: Trinidad and Tobago
- Third place: Mexico
- Fourth place: Honduras

Tournament statistics
- Matches played: 10
- Goals scored: 27 (2.7 per match)

The 1983 CONCACAF U-17 Championship was the first tournament in the Under-17 category organized by the CONCACAF. Trinidad and Tobago hosted the event between August 26 and September 3, and it was won by the United States.

== Group stage ==
Top two in each group advance to semifinals.

=== Group A ===
Pos	Team	Pld	W	D	L	GF	GA	GD	Pts	Qualification
1	Trinidad and Tobago	2	1	1	0	5	1	+4	3	Qualification to the Semifinals
2	United States	2	1	1	0	5	2	+3	3	Qualification to the Semifinals
3	El Salvador	2	0	0	2	1	8	−7	0	

26 August 1983

El Salvador	1–4	United States
	Report

Port of Spain

28 August 1983

Trinidad and Tobago	4–0	El Salvador
	Report

Port of Spain

30 August 1983

Trinidad and Tobago	1–1	United States
	Report

Port of Spain

=== Group B ===
Pos	Team	Pld	W	D	L	GF	GA	GD	Pts	Qualification
1	Mexico	2	2	0	0	12	0	+12	4	Qualification to the Semifinals
2	Honduras	2	1	0	1	1	4	−3	2	Qualification to the Semifinals
3	Puerto Rico	2	0	0	2	0	9	−9	0	

26 August 1983

Mexico	4–0	Honduras
	Report

Port of Spain

28 August 1983

Honduras	1–0	Puerto Rico
	Report

Port of Spain

30 August 1983

Mexico	8–0	Puerto Rico
	Report

Port of Spain

== Knockout stages ==
Semi-finals
1 September
United States	2
Honduras	0
1 September
Mexico	0 (4)
Trinidad and Tobago(PSO)	0 (5)

Final
3 September
United States(PSO)	0 (5)
Trinidad and Tobago	0 (3)
Third place
3 September
Mexico (a.e.t.)	1
Honduras	0

=== Semifinals ===
1 September 1983

United States	2–0	Honduras
	Report

Port of Spain

1 September 1983

Trinidad and Tobago	0–0 (a.e.t.) (5–4 PSO)	Mexico
	Report

Port of Spain

=== Third place play-off ===
3 September 1983

Mexico	1–0 (a.e.t.)	Honduras
	Report

Port of Spain

=== Final ===
3 September 1983

United States	0–0 (a.e.t.) (5–3 PSO)	Trinidad and Tobago
	Report

Port of Spain
