= 2023 CONCACAF U-17 Championship squads =

Association football tournament

The 2023 CONCACAF U-17 Championship was an international football tournament that was held in Guatemala from 11 to 26 February 2023. The twenty participating national teams were required to register a squad of up to 20 players, of which two had to be goalkeepers. Only players in these squads were eligible to take part in the tournament. The tournament exclusively required players to be born between 1 January 2006 and 31 December 2008 to be eligible, that is, they had to be a maximum of 17 years old and at least 15 years old by the end of the calendar year in which the competition was played.

Each national team had to submit a provisional list of a minimum of 20 and a maximum of 60 players (including at least four goalkeepers) to CONCACAF no later than thirty days prior to the start of the tournament and players could be added before the final list deadline. The final list of up to 20 players per national team had to be submitted to CONCACAF by 1 February 2023, ten days before the opening match of the tournament. All players in the final list had to be chosen from the respective provisional list. In the event that a player on the submitted final list suffered a serious injury or illness up to 24 hours before the kick-off of his team's first match of the tournament, that player could be replaced, provided that it was approved by the CONCACAF Medical Committee. The replacement player had to come from the provisional list and was assigned the shirt number of the replaced player.

CONCACAF published the final lists on 6 February 2023.

The age listed for each player is on 11 February 2023, the first day of the tournament. A flag is included for coaches who are of a different nationality than their own national team.

== Group E ==
=== Mexico ===
Mexico announced their squad of 20 players on 31 January 2023.

Head coach: Raúl Chabrand

No.	Pos.	Player	Date of birth (age)	Club
1	GK	Norberto Bedolla	1 January 2006 (aged 17)	(Mexican Football Federation) América
2	DF	Javier Suárez	4 May 2006 (aged 16)	(Mexican Football Federation) Cruz Azul
3	DF	Kevin García	9 February 2006 (aged 17)	(Mexican Football Federation) Santos Laguna
4	DF	Luis Navarrete	23 August 2006 (aged 16)	(Mexican Football Federation) Toluca
5	DF	Javen Romero	21 April 2006 (aged 16)	(United States Soccer Federation) Los Angeles FC
6	MF	Isaac Martínez	23 March 2006 (aged 16)	(Mexican Football Federation) Guadalajara
7	MF	Brandon Lomelí	10 November 2006 (aged 16)	(Mexican Football Federation) Necaxa
8	MF	Alejandro Urías	25 March 2006 (aged 16)	(Mexican Football Federation) Monterrey
9	FW	Stephano Carrillo	7 March 2006 (aged 16)	(Mexican Football Federation) Santos Laguna
10	MF	Gael Álvarez	9 March 2006 (aged 16)	(Mexican Football Federation) Pachuca
11	FW	Fidel Barajas	5 April 2006 (aged 16)	(United States Soccer Federation) Charleston Battery
12	GK	Fernando Delgado	25 July 2006 (aged 16)	(United States Soccer Federation) Real Salt Lake
13	DF	José Muro	6 April 2006 (aged 16)	(Mexican Football Federation) Monterrey
14	MF	José Miguel Arroyo	29 April 2006 (aged 16)	(Mexican Football Federation) Toluca
15	DF	Jonathan Flores	14 July 2006 (aged 16)	(Mexican Football Federation) UNAM
16	MF	Alex Valencia	2 February 2006 (aged 17)	(Mexican Football Federation) Santos Laguna
17	MF	Israel Tello	18 January 2006 (aged 17)	(Mexican Football Federation) Necaxa
18	MF	Samir Inda	7 October 2007 (aged 15)	(Mexican Football Federation) Guadalajara
19	FW	Joaquín Moxica	27 January 2006 (aged 17)	(Mexican Football Federation) Monterrey
20	MF	Yerar Azcarate	9 February 2006 (aged 17)	(Mexican Football Federation) Pachuca

=== Panama ===
Panama announced their squad of 20 players on 1 February 2023.

Head coach: (United States) Mike Stump

No.	Pos.	Player	Date of birth (age)	Club
1	GK	Manuel Romero	4 April 2006 (aged 16)	(Panamanian Football Federation) Árabe Unido
2	DF	Juriel Nereida	4 January 2006 (aged 17)	(Panamanian Football Federation) Árabe Unido
3	MF	Joshua Pierre	9 March 2006 (aged 16)	(Panamanian Football Federation) Plaza Amador
4	DF	Giancarlos García	4 February 2006 (aged 17)	(Panamanian Football Federation) Árabe Unido
5	DF	Juan Hall	9 March 2006 (aged 16)	(Panamanian Football Federation) Academy Champions
6	MF	Anel Ryce	6 July 2006 (aged 16)	(Panamanian Football Federation) Plaza Amador
7	MF	Kevin Walder	13 April 2006 (aged 16)	(Panamanian Football Federation) Plaza Amador
8	FW	Luis Mendoza	22 June 2006 (aged 16)	(Mexican Football Federation) Tecos
9	FW	José Rodríguez	25 March 2006 (aged 16)	(Panamanian Football Federation) Independiente
10	MF	Éric Moreno	28 March 2006 (aged 16)	(Panamanian Football Federation) Universitario
11	MF	Oldemar Castillo	5 January 2006 (aged 17)	(Panamanian Football Federation) Sporting San Miguelito
12	GK	Said David	1 April 2006 (aged 16)	(Panamanian Football Federation) UMECIT
13	DF	Érick Díaz	4 March 2006 (aged 16)	(Panamanian Football Federation) Tauro
14	DF	Juan Jiménez	4 May 2006 (aged 16)	(Panamanian Football Federation) Plaza Amador
15	MF	Ricardo Jiménez	30 July 2007 (aged 15)	(Panamanian Football Federation) Mario Méndez
16	DF	Edward González	27 August 2006 (aged 16)	(Panamanian Football Federation) Plaza Amador
17	FW	Luis Gaitán	8 August 2006 (aged 16)	(Panamanian Football Federation) San Francisco
18	FW	Héctor Ríos	6 January 2006 (aged 17)	(Panamanian Football Federation) Universitario
19	MF	Kahir Tovares	6 May 2006 (aged 16)	(Panamanian Football Federation) UDELAS
20	DF	Martín Krug	9 July 2006 (aged 16)	(Royal Spanish Football Federation) Levante

=== Guatemala ===
Guatemala announced their squad of 20 players on 6 February 2023.

Head coach: (Mexico) Marvin Cabrera

No.	Pos.	Player	Date of birth (age)	Club
1	GK	Diego Bolaños	21 June 2006 (aged 16)	(National Football Federation of Guatemala) Juventud Canadiense
2	DF	Nicolás Chinchilla	5 November 2006 (aged 16)	(United States Soccer Federation) Maryland United FC
3	DF	Daniel Mérida	12 April 2006 (aged 16)	(National Football Federation of Guatemala) Municipal
4	DF	Christopher Raymundo	1 September 2006 (aged 16)	(National Football Federation of Guatemala) Municipal
5	DF	Jeffery López	24 January 2007 (aged 16)	(United States Soccer Federation) New York City FC
6	MF	Ariel Lon	22 October 2006 (aged 16)	(National Football Federation of Guatemala) Guastatoya
7	DF	Héctor Prillwitz	29 March 2006 (aged 16)	(National Football Federation of Guatemala) Juventud Pinulteca
8	MF	Santiago Garzaro	7 March 2006 (aged 16)	(National Football Federation of Guatemala) Comunicaciones
9	FW	Oseas Guerra	13 June 2006 (aged 16)	(National Football Federation of Guatemala) Antigua
10	FW	Alex De la Cruz	3 March 2006 (aged 16)	(National Football Federation of Guatemala) Comunicaciones
11	FW	Gabino Vásquez	19 February 2006 (aged 16)	(National Football Federation of Guatemala) Antigua
12	GK	John Lutin	17 July 2007 (aged 15)	(United States Soccer Federation) FC Dallas
13	MF	Saúl Sagastume	23 November 2007 (aged 15)	(National Football Federation of Guatemala) Antigua
14	MF	Kevin Illescas	2 April 2006 (aged 16)	(National Football Federation of Guatemala) Comunicaciones
15	DF	Carlos Aguilar	25 October 2006 (aged 16)	(National Football Federation of Guatemala) Malacateco
16	DF	Elvi Ellington	17 May 2006 (aged 16)	(National Football Federation of Guatemala) Municipal
17	MF	Antony Recinos	7 April 2006 (aged 16)	(United States Soccer Federation) New York City FC
18	FW	Anthony Salamá	22 August 2006 (aged 16)	(National Football Federation of Guatemala) Municipal
19	MF	Olger Escobar	11 September 2006 (aged 16)	(United States Soccer Federation) New England Revolution
20	MF	Matt Evans	25 May 2006 (aged 16)	(United States Soccer Federation) Los Angeles FC

=== Curaçao ===
Curaçao announced their final squad of 20 players on 6 February 2023.

Head coach: Demy Rosario

No.	Pos.	Player	Date of birth (age)	Club
1	GK	Irdjoailly Emelina	17 April 2007 (aged 15)	(Curaçao Football Federation) Atletiko Saliña
2	DF	Declan Kleiboer	8 March 2006 (aged 16)	(Royal Belgian Football Association) Hoogstraten
3	MF	Rochendrick Mathilda	5 November 2006 (aged 16)	(Curaçao Football Federation) Inter Willemstad
4	MF	Dayshawn Isabella	12 March 2006 (aged 16)	(Curaçao Football Federation) New Song
5	DF	Noah Calister	8 October 2006 (aged 16)	(Curaçao Football Federation) Atletiko Saliña
6	MF	Shuvienchêlo Hooi (captain)	8 June 2006 (aged 16)	(Curaçao Football Federation) Vesta
7	MF	Giandro Sambo	28 August 2006 (aged 16)	(Royal Dutch Football Association) Ajax
8	FW	Luigi Inesia	3 April 2006 (aged 16)	(Curaçao Football Federation) New Song
9	MF	Carlos Sientje	20 January 2007 (aged 16)	(Royal Dutch Football Association) Feyenoord
10	DF	Demiane Agustien	28 July 2007 (aged 15)	(The Football Association) Derby County
11	FW	Gediël Vicento	5 February 2006 (aged 17)	(Curaçao Football Federation) New Song
12	GK	Quishurean Jourdain	24 November 2006 (aged 16)	(Curaçao Football Federation) C-Stars United
13	FW	Tarino Marchena	22 August 2006 (aged 16)	(Curaçao Football Federation) Inter Willemstad
14	MF	Cristian Pop	28 June 2006 (aged 16)	(Curaçao Football Federation) SUBT
15	FW	Shermayn Rombley	27 July 2007 (aged 15)	(Curaçao Football Federation) SUBT
16	MF	Darwin Lourens	16 March 2007 (aged 15)	(Curaçao Football Federation) SUBT
17	MF	Jeandino Windster	5 February 2006 (aged 17)	(Curaçao Football Federation) Victory Boys
18	FW	Sebastian van Woerkom	17 February 2008 (aged 14)	(Curaçao Football Federation) Inter Willemstad
19	MF	Patrick Hook	16 March 2006 (aged 16)	(Curaçao Football Federation) Atletiko Saliña
20	MF	Kavin Hato	25 October 2006 (aged 16)	(Curaçao Football Federation) SUBT

== Group F ==
=== United States ===
The United States announced their squad of 20 players on 3 February 2023. On 6 February 2023, goalkeeper Diego Kochen was replaced by Duran Ferree due to injury.

Head coach: (Costa Rica) Gonzalo Segares

No.	Pos.	Player	Date of birth (age)	Club
1	GK	Duran Ferree	28 September 2006 (aged 16)	(United States Soccer Federation) San Diego Loyal SC
2	DF	Oscar Verhoeven	31 May 2006 (aged 16)	(United States Soccer Federation) San Jose Earthquakes
3	DF	Sawyer Jura	9 March 2006 (aged 16)	(United States Soccer Federation) Portland Timbers
4	DF	Tyler Hall	5 February 2006 (aged 17)	(United States Soccer Federation) Inter Miami CF
5	DF	Stuart Hawkins	18 September 2006 (aged 16)	(United States Soccer Federation) Seattle Sounders FC
6	MF	Edwyn Mendoza	3 May 2006 (aged 16)	(United States Soccer Federation) San Jose Earthquakes
7	FW	Brian Carmona	11 May 2006 (aged 16)	(United States Soccer Federation) Charlotte FC
8	MF	Pedro Soma	30 June 2006 (aged 16)	(Royal Spanish Football Federation) Cornellà
9	FW	Micah Burton	26 March 2006 (aged 16)	(United States Soccer Federation) Austin FC
10	MF	Cruz Medina	24 September 2006 (aged 16)	(United States Soccer Federation) San Jose Earthquakes
11	FW	David Vázquez	22 February 2006 (aged 16)	(United States Soccer Federation) Philadelphia Union
12	GK	Adam Beaudry	18 April 2006 (aged 16)	(United States Soccer Federation) Colorado Rapids
13	DF	Aidan Harangi	8 February 2006 (aged 17)	(German Football Association) Eintracht Frankfurt
14	MF	Taha Habroune	5 February 2006 (aged 17)	(United States Soccer Federation) Columbus Crew
15	DF	Christian Díaz	30 March 2006 (aged 16)	(United States Soccer Federation) Los Angeles FC
16	MF	Adrian Gill	3 January 2006 (aged 17)	(Royal Spanish Football Federation) Barcelona
17	FW	Keyrol Figueroa	31 August 2006 (aged 16)	(The Football Association) Liverpool
18	FW	Ezekiel Soto	14 January 2007 (aged 16)	(United States Soccer Federation) Houston Dynamo FC
19	MF	Paulo Rudisill	7 February 2006 (aged 17)	(United States Soccer Federation) LA Galaxy
20	MF	Christopher Aquino	31 March 2006 (aged 16)	(United States Soccer Federation) Seattle Sounders FC

=== Canada ===
Canada announced a provisional squad of 23 players on 31 January 2023. The final squad of 20 players was confirmed by CONCACAF on 6 February 2023.

Head coach: Andrew Olivieri

No.	Pos.	Player	Date of birth (age)	Club
1	GK	Nathaniel Abraham	23 April 2007 (aged 15)	(Canadian Soccer Association) Toronto FC]
2	MF	Theo Rigopoulos	29 October 2006 (aged 16)	(Canadian Soccer Association) Toronto FC
3	DF	Gaël de Montigny	16 March 2006 (aged 16)	(Canadian Soccer Association) CF Montréal
4	MF	Alessandro Biello	7 April 2006 (aged 16)	(Canadian Soccer Association) CF Montréal
5	DF	Chimere Omeze	2 June 2006 (aged 16)	(Canadian Soccer Association) Toronto FC
6	DF	Lazar Stefanovic	10 August 2006 (aged 16)	(Canadian Soccer Association) Toronto FC
7	FW	Ibrahim Higazy	4 January 2006 (aged 17)	(Royal Spanish Football Federation) Rayo Vallecano
8	MF	Jeevan Badwal	11 March 2006 (aged 16)	(Canadian Soccer Association) Vancouver Whitecaps FC
9	FW	Erik Pop	30 January 2006 (aged 17)	(German Football Association) Karlsruher SC
10	MF	Antoine N'Diaye	7 April 2006 (aged 16)	(Canadian Soccer Association) CF Montréal
11	FW	Lucas Ozimec	18 January 2006 (aged 17)	(Canadian Soccer Association) Toronto FC
12	DF	Aidan Fong	28 March 2006 (aged 16)	(Canadian Soccer Association) Vancouver Whitecaps FC
13	DF	Richard Chukwu	25 February 2008 (aged 14)	(Canadian Soccer Association) Toronto FC
14	MF	Ruben de Sá	8 February 2006 (aged 17)	(Portuguese Football Federation) Vitória Guimarães
15	DF	Victor Fung	13 August 2007 (aged 15)	(United States Soccer Federation) Inter Miami CF
16	DF	Étienne Godin	1 February 2006 (aged 17)	(Canadian Soccer Association) CF Montréal
17	DF	Liam MacKenzie	15 March 2007 (aged 15)	(Canadian Soccer Association) Vancouver Whitecaps FC
18	GK	Alexander O’Brien	23 May 2006 (aged 16)	(Canadian Soccer Association) Toronto FC
19	FW	Kyler Vojvodic	5 June 2006 (aged 16)	(Canadian Soccer Association) Vancouver Whitecaps FC
20	MF	Andrei Dumitru	28 October 2006 (aged 16)	(Canadian Soccer Association) Toronto FC

=== Trinidad and Tobago ===
Trinidad and Tobago announced their squad of 20 players on 1 February 2023.

Head coach: Shawn Cooper

No.	Pos.	Player	Date of birth (age)	Club
1	GK	Ailan Panton	28 April 2006 (aged 16)	(United States Soccer Federation) Darlington Soccer Academy
2	DF	Jaden Williams	9 March 2006 (aged 16)	(Trinidad and Tobago Football Association) Queen's Park
3	DF	Joshua Figaro	25 June 2006 (aged 16)	(Trinidad and Tobago Football Association) Trendsetter Hawks Academy
4	DF	Lyshaun Morris	8 February 2007 (aged 16)	(Trinidad and Tobago Football Association) Point Fortin Academy
5	DF	Samuel Duncan	10 January 2007 (aged 16)	(United States Soccer Federation) Charlotte FC
6	DF	Aydon Caruth	13 February 2006 (aged 16)	(Trinidad and Tobago Football Association) Police
7	MF	Rio Cardines	7 January 2006 (aged 17)	(The Football Association) Crystal Palace
8	MF	Josiah Ochoa	8 January 2007 (aged 16)	(Trinidad and Tobago Football Association) Point Fortin Academy
9	FW	Lindell Sween	27 September 2006 (aged 16)	Unattached
10	FW	Michael Chaves	4 June 2006 (aged 16)	(Trinidad and Tobago Football Association) Queen's Park
11	MF	Derrel Garcia	3 March 2007 (aged 15)	(Trinidad and Tobago Football Association) Cox Football Academy
12	MF	Jeremiah Cateau	27 August 2006 (aged 16)	(United States Soccer Federation) Concorde Fire
13	FW	Vaughn Clement	26 June 2007 (aged 15)	(Trinidad and Tobago Football Association) Cox Football Academy
14	MF	Tau Lamsee	31 January 2007 (aged 16)	(Trinidad and Tobago Football Association) Pro Series Events
15	MF	Armani Rowe	4 March 2006 (aged 16)	(United States Soccer Federation) Cedar Stars Academy
16	MF	Jeremiah Niles	14 March 2006 (aged 16)	(Trinidad and Tobago Football Association) Point Fortin Academy
17	FW	Malachi Webb	6 January 2007 (aged 16)	(Trinidad and Tobago Football Association) Club Premier FC
18	MF	Dominic Wilson	10 September 2006 (aged 16)	(United States Soccer Federation) Nashville SC
19	FW	Tyrell Moore	5 February 2006 (aged 17)	(United States Soccer Federation) Nashville SC
20	GK	Jaden Ottley	27 August 2006 (aged 16)	(Trinidad and Tobago Football Association) Queen's Park

=== Barbados ===
Barbados announced their final squad of 20 players on 6 February 2023.

Head coach: Fabian Massiah

No.	Pos.	Player	Date of birth (age)	Club
1	GK	K'Den Hee Chung	20 March 2006 (aged 16)	(Barbados Football Association) Pro Shottas United
2	DF	Micaiah Clarke	2 September 2007 (aged 15)	(Barbados Football Association) National Sports Council
3	DF	Ajani Banton	18 December 2006 (aged 16)	(Jamaica Football Federation) Ballaz International
4	DF	Warren Trotman (captain)	5 December 2006 (aged 16)	(Barbados Football Association) UWI Blackbirds
5	DF	Kamari Johnson	21 June 2007 (aged 15)	(Barbados Football Association) West Coast Youth Academy
6	DF	Amego Jordan	19 February 2006 (aged 16)	(Barbados Football Association) Pinelands FC
7	MF	Shamari Harewood	25 May 2006 (aged 16)	(Barbados Football Association) Paradise
8	MF	Joshua Husbands	4 April 2006 (aged 16)	(Barbados Football Association) Whitehall FA
9	FW	Che Millington	24 December 2006 (aged 16)	(Barbados Football Association) Pro Shottas United
10	FW	Rovaldo Massiah	17 August 2006 (aged 16)	(Barbados Football Association) Pro Shottas United
11	MF	Christian Gill	20 February 2006 (aged 16)	(Barbados Football Association) Pro Shottas United
12	MF	Kiaros Greaves	12 September 2006 (aged 16)	(Barbados Football Association) Technique FC
13	DF	Kobe Burges	11 January 2006 (aged 17)	(Barbados Football Association) Pinelands FC
14	DF	Ephraim Gill	4 May 2007 (aged 15)	(Barbados Football Association) Pro Shottas United
15	MF	Jayden Grenidge	5 September 2006 (aged 16)	(Barbados Football Association) Kick Start FC
16	DF	Zachari Yard	2 October 2007 (aged 15)	(Barbados Football Association) Pro Shottas United
17	MF	Ronan Lee	3 February 2007 (aged 16)	(Barbados Football Association) Pro Shottas United
18	GK	Jireh Malcolm	21 November 2006 (aged 16)	(Barbados Football Association) Potential Ballers FC
19	DF	Ajanie Payne	27 April 2007 (aged 15)	(Barbados Football Association) Barbados Soccer Academy
20	MF	James Moore	1 January 2006 (aged 17)	(Barbados Football Association) Pro Shottas United

== Group G ==
=== Costa Rica ===
Costa Rica announced their squad of 20 players on 3 February 2023.

Head coach: Erick Rodríguez

No.	Pos.	Player	Date of birth (age)	Club
1	GK	Emmanuel Garita	29 January 2006 (aged 17)	(Costa Rican Football Federation) Herediano
2	DF	José Arias	13 January 2006 (aged 17)	(Costa Rican Football Federation) Saprissa
3	DF	Víctor Maroto	11 February 2006 (aged 17)	(Costa Rican Football Federation) Alajuelense
4	DF	Isaac Badilla	18 June 2008 (aged 14)	(Costa Rican Football Federation) Alajuelense
5	MF	Deylan Aguilar	6 January 2007 (aged 16)	(Costa Rican Football Federation) Alajuelense
6	DF	Andry Naranjo	7 October 2006 (aged 16)	(Costa Rican Football Federation) Jicaral
7	FW	Sean Albritton	2 May 2007 (aged 15)	(United States Soccer Federation) Dallas Texans SC
8	MF	Roy Bustos	23 February 2006 (aged 16)	(Costa Rican Football Federation) Alajuelense
9	FW	Óscar Segura	28 August 2006 (aged 16)	(Costa Rican Football Federation) Saprissa
10	MF	Claudio Montero	14 April 2006 (aged 16)	(Costa Rican Football Federation) Alajuelense
11	MF	Andrik Sandí	18 July 2006 (aged 16)	(Costa Rican Football Federation) San Carlos
12	MF	Randy Peña	23 May 2006 (aged 16)	(Costa Rican Football Federation) Herediano
13	FW	Edmilson Guevara	16 February 2007 (aged 15)	(Costa Rican Football Federation) Alajuelense
14	DF	Andrid Rojas	15 March 2007 (aged 15)	(Costa Rican Football Federation) Santos de Guápiles
15	MF	Denilson Ampie	1 August 2007 (aged 15)	(Costa Rican Football Federation) Guanacasteca
16	DF	Walter Ramírez	19 January 2007 (aged 16)	(Costa Rican Football Federation) Alajuelense
17	DF	Kenan Myrie	6 September 2006 (aged 16)	(Costa Rican Football Federation) Saprissa
18	GK	Berny Rojas	13 August 2006 (aged 16)	(Costa Rican Football Federation) Saprissa
19	DF	Bryan Morales	20 October 2006 (aged 16)	(Costa Rican Football Federation) Alajuelense
20	MF	Akheem Wilson	7 February 2007 (aged 16)	(Costa Rican Football Federation) Saprissa

=== Jamaica ===
Jamaica announced their squad of 20 players on 1 February 2023.

Head coach: Merron Gordon

No.	Pos.	Player	Date of birth (age)	Club
1	GK	Tawayne Lynch	19 January 2006 (aged 17)	(Jamaica Football Federation) Mount Pleasant
2	MF	Malachi Molina	11 October 2006 (aged 16)	(United States Soccer Federation) FC Dallas
3	MF	Maleek Robinson	18 July 2007 (aged 15)	(Jamaica Football Federation) Garvey Maceo High
4	MF	Alexavier Gooden	28 August 2006 (aged 16)	(Jamaica Football Federation) STATHS
5	MF	Ahir Dixon	6 March 2006 (aged 16)	(Jamaica Football Federation) Mount Pleasant
6	MF	Adrian Reid	5 September 2006 (aged 16)	(Jamaica Football Federation) St. George's College
7	DF	Dyllon John	10 March 2006 (aged 16)	(Jamaica Football Federation) Jamaica College
8	DF	Ronaldo Barrett	4 July 2006 (aged 16)	(Jamaica Football Federation) Hydel High
9	FW	Orane Watson	11 November 2006 (aged 16)	(Jamaica Football Federation) Glenmuir High
10	FW	Jahmani Bell	11 October 2007 (aged 15)	(Jamaica Football Federation) Wolmer's Schools
11	MF	Nahshon Bolt-Barrett	19 May 2006 (aged 16)	(Jamaica Football Federation) Clarendon College
12	DF	Evrald Swaby	4 June 2006 (aged 16)	(Jamaica Football Federation) Garvey Maceo High
13	GK	Joshua Grant	27 May 2007 (aged 15)	(United States Soccer Federation) Inter Miami CF
14	DF	Jordan Mangatal	8 December 2006 (aged 16)	(United States Soccer Federation) South Florida Football Academy
15	DF	Jason Whyte	13 July 2006 (aged 16)	(Jamaica Football Federation) Glenmuir High
16	FW	Nicholas Simmonds	17 December 2006 (aged 16)	(Jamaica Football Federation) Richmond United
17	DF	Dustin Cohen	22 December 2006 (aged 16)	(Jamaica Football Federation) Denbigh High
18	MF	Brandon Bent	24 January 2007 (aged 16)	(United States Soccer Federation) Inter Miami CF
19	FW	Ashton Gordon	14 April 2007 (aged 15)	(United States Soccer Federation) Atlanta United FC
20	FW	Adrian Mahoney	22 July 2006 (aged 16)	(Canadian Soccer Association) Toronto FC

=== Cuba ===
The Cuba squad of 20 players was confirmed by CONCACAF on 6 February 2023.

Head coach: Sandro Sevillano

No.	Pos.	Player	Date of birth (age)	Club
1	GK	Isuhanis Pérez	5 January 2006 (aged 17)	(Football Association of Cuba) Cienfuegos
2	DF	Yeasy Quiñones	5 May 2007 (aged 15)	(Football Association of Cuba) La Habana
3	DF	Cheison Herrera	7 July 2006 (aged 16)	(Football Association of Cuba) La Habana
4	DF	Geordanis Téllez	19 April 2006 (aged 16)	(Football Association of Cuba) Santiago de Cuba
5	DF	Cristian Pérez	26 March 2006 (aged 16)	(Football Association of Cuba) Ciego de Ávila
6	MF	Luis Kindelán	5 January 2006 (aged 17)	(Football Association of Cuba) Santiago de Cuba
7	FW	Yansiel Reinoso	20 January 2007 (aged 16)	(Football Association of Cuba) Artemisa
8	MF	Lainier Juanes	30 March 2006 (aged 16)	(Football Association of Cuba) Las Tunas
9	FW	Lizardo Hernández	7 February 2006 (aged 17)	(Football Association of Cuba) Pinar del Río
10	FW	Didier Reinoso	31 March 2007 (aged 15)	(Football Association of Cuba) La Habana
11	FW	Hanoy Sosa	6 January 2006 (aged 17)	(Football Association of Cuba) Camagüey
12	GK	Yurixander Zayas	3 May 2007 (aged 15)	(Football Association of Cuba) Ciego de Ávila
13	DF	Víctor Cutiño	29 November 2006 (aged 16)	(Football Association of Cuba) Las Tunas
14	MF	Maikol Vega	12 September 2006 (aged 16)	(Football Association of Cuba) La Habana
15	MF	Enmanuel Rivera	19 February 2007 (aged 15)	(Football Association of Cuba) Matanzas
16	MF	Diego Vento	6 July 2006 (aged 16)	(Football Association of Cuba) Pinar del Río
17	FW	Jade Quiñones	23 September 2007 (aged 15)	(Football Association of Cuba) La Habana
18	DF	Leandro García	2 July 2007 (aged 15)	(Football Association of Cuba) Artemisa
19	FW	Rainiel Morales	28 April 2007 (aged 15)	(Football Association of Cuba) Mayabeque
20	MF	Enzo Viamontes	12 March 2007 (aged 15)	(Football Association of Cuba) La Habana

=== Guadeloupe ===
Guadeloupe announced their squad of 20 players on 3 February 2023.

Head coach: Richard Guyon

No.	Pos.	Player	Date of birth (age)	Club
1	GK	Bryan Ducalcon	19 May 2006 (aged 16)	(Ligue guadeloupéenne de football) Juvenis
2	DF	Mathys Calixte	7 April 2006 (aged 16)	(Ligue guadeloupéenne de football) USBM
3	DF	Yanis Bienville	2 March 2007 (aged 15)	(Ligue guadeloupéenne de football) CERFA
4	DF	Killian Mourouvin	16 October 2006 (aged 16)	(Ligue guadeloupéenne de football) CS Moulien
5	DF	Evan Lauriette	19 February 2006 (aged 16)	(Ligue guadeloupéenne de football) AS Gosier
6	MF	Ylan Moloza	20 September 2006 (aged 16)	(Ligue guadeloupéenne de football) Sporting B/M
7	FW	Ludgy Luce	7 May 2006 (aged 16)	(Ligue guadeloupéenne de football) L'Etoile
8	FW	Womann Peccatus	7 September 2006 (aged 16)	(Ligue guadeloupéenne de football) CERFA
9	FW	Danny's Cordinel	16 July 2006 (aged 16)	(Ligue guadeloupéenne de football) CERFA
10	MF	Lorick Gustave	17 December 2006 (aged 16)	(Ligue guadeloupéenne de football) CERFA
11	FW	Willan Jacques	26 January 2006 (aged 17)	(Ligue guadeloupéenne de football) CERFA
12	MF	Axel Calau-Pointel	13 December 2007 (aged 15)	(Ligue guadeloupéenne de football) CERFA
13	MF	David Boucher	2 April 2007 (aged 15)	(Ligue guadeloupéenne de football) CS Moulien
14	DF	Jyl-Lian Forlac	9 May 2006 (aged 16)	(Ligue guadeloupéenne de football) CS Moulien
15	FW	Kurt Germain	1 January 2006 (aged 17)	(Ligue guadeloupéenne de football) Arsenal Club
16	GK	Wilhem Perran	8 March 2006 (aged 16)	(Ligue guadeloupéenne de football) CERFA
17	MF	Edson Cantin	11 March 2006 (aged 16)	(Ligue guadeloupéenne de football) AS Gosier
18	DF	Mathis Fernandes	26 January 2006 (aged 17)	(Ligue guadeloupéenne de football) Solidarité-Scolaire
19	MF	Samuel Solitude	13 January 2006 (aged 17)	(Ligue guadeloupéenne de football) AS Gosier
20	MF	Kylian Coriolan	2 September 2006 (aged 16)	(Ligue guadeloupéenne de football) La Gauloise

== Group H ==
=== Honduras ===
Honduras announced their squad of 20 players on 4 February 2023.

Head coach: Israel Canales

No.	Pos.	Player	Date of birth (age)	Club
1	GK	Rodbin Mejía	11 October 2006 (aged 16)	(National Autonomous Federation of Football of Honduras) Olimpia
2	DF	Stiven Boquín	24 September 2006 (aged 16)	(National Autonomous Federation of Football of Honduras) Águilas
3	DF	David Herrera	15 January 2006 (aged 17)	(National Autonomous Federation of Football of Honduras) Olimpia
4	DF	Brayan Vaquedano	30 January 2006 (aged 17)	(National Autonomous Federation of Football of Honduras) Victoria
5	MF	Jonathan Bueso	17 August 2006 (aged 16)	(National Autonomous Federation of Football of Honduras) Marathón
6	DF	José Cálix	17 August 2006 (aged 16)	(United States Soccer Federation) D.C. United
7	MF	Nixon Cruz	3 August 2006 (aged 16)	(National Autonomous Federation of Football of Honduras) Honduras Progreso
8	MF	Daylor Cacho	30 July 2006 (aged 16)	(National Autonomous Federation of Football of Honduras) Real España
9	FW	Nayrobi Vargas	20 May 2006 (aged 16)	(United States Soccer Federation) FC Dallas
10	MF	Roberto Osorto	18 January 2006 (aged 17)	(National Autonomous Federation of Football of Honduras) Real España
11	FW	Bryan Saenz	28 February 2006 (aged 16)	(National Autonomous Federation of Football of Honduras) Olimpia
12	GK	Owen Macías	5 January 2006 (aged 17)	(National Autonomous Federation of Football of Honduras) Motagua
13	MF	Maikol Morales	12 November 2006 (aged 16)	(National Autonomous Federation of Football of Honduras) Platense
14	MF	Edwin Munguía	4 May 2006 (aged 16)	(National Autonomous Federation of Football of Honduras) Vida
15	DF	Eric Vallecillo	27 December 2006 (aged 16)	(United States Soccer Federation) Miami Breakers FC
16	DF	Jordan García	31 March 2006 (aged 16)	(National Autonomous Federation of Football of Honduras) Motagua
17	MF	Saúl Estrada	6 July 2006 (aged 16)	(National Autonomous Federation of Football of Honduras) Motagua
18	MF	Johan Navas	3 April 2006 (aged 16)	(National Autonomous Federation of Football of Honduras) Motagua
19	FW	Russel Cruz	30 May 2006 (aged 16)	(National Autonomous Federation of Football of Honduras) Vida
20	MF	Alessandro Maldonado	23 March 2006 (aged 16)	(United States Soccer Federation) D.C. United

=== Haiti ===
Haiti announced their 60-man provisional squad on 23 December 2022, which was reduced to 28 players on 16 January 2023. The final squad of 20 players was confirmed by CONCACAF on 6 February 2023. However, the Haitian Football Federation announced an updated list on 9 February 2023 with defender Danley Felix and forward Micah Williams being replaced by Kaief Tomlison and Aleksandr Guboglo respectively.

Head coach: Angelo Jean Baptiste

No.	Pos.	Player	Date of birth (age)	Club
1	GK	Freud's Antoine	1 December 2006 (aged 16)	(Haitian Football Federation) AS Truitier
2	DF	Kaief Tomlison	11 April 2006 (aged 16)	(United States Soccer Federation) New York City FC Academy
3	DF	Victor Siat	22 March 2006 (aged 16)	(French Football Federation) Strasbourg
4	DF	Rikanel Chery	21 August 2006 (aged 16)	(Haitian Football Federation) Exafoot
5	DF	Luckson Blaise	8 July 2006 (aged 16)	(Haitian Football Federation) Don Bosco
6	MF	Dylan Alexis	7 April 2006 (aged 16)	(Canadian Soccer Association) CF Montréal
7	FW	Aleksandr Guboglo	20 March 2007 (aged 15)	(Canadian Soccer Association) CF Montréal
8	MF	Bretous Julian	21 January 2007 (aged 16)	(United States Soccer Federation) Atlanta United FC
9	FW	Bryan Destin (captain)	26 February 2006 (aged 16)	(United States Soccer Federation) Inter Miami CF
10	MF	Victor Joseph	10 April 2006 (aged 16)	(French Football Federation) Sochaux
11	MF	Schneilorens LeBrun (2nd captain)	12 June 2006 (aged 16)	(Haitian Football Federation) Exafoot
12	GK	Tony Algarin	20 January 2007 (aged 16)	(French Football Federation) Metz
13	MF	Cliford Louis-Jean	24 December 2006 (aged 16)	(Haitian Football Federation) Violette
14	MF	Clarence Jean-Gilles	3 October 2006 (aged 16)	(Haitian Football Federation) Mercure
15	DF	Miguelson Toussaint	14 January 2006 (aged 17)	(Haitian Football Federation) Violette
16	DF	Samuel Lamare	6 March 2007 (aged 15)	(Canadian Soccer Association) CF Montréal
17	MF	Kerry Carrière	18 May 2006 (aged 16)	(Haitian Football Federation) FC Solution
18	FW	Sébastien Joseph	2 January 2007 (aged 16)	(Canadian Soccer Association) CF Montréal
19	DF	Andreson Joseph	22 September 2006 (aged 16)	(Haitian Football Federation) Valencia
20	FW	Jean Dajolly	22 December 2006 (aged 16)	(Haitian Football Federation) Exafoot

=== El Salvador ===
The El Salvador squad of 20 players was confirmed by CONCACAF on 6 February 2023, and later announced by the Salvadoran Football Federation on 9 February 2023.

Head coach: Juan Carlos Serrano

No.	Pos.	Player	Date of birth (age)	Club
1	GK	Hamilton Lemus	16 November 2006 (aged 16)	(Salvadoran Football Federation) Chalatenango
2	MF	Steven Mancia	31 January 2006 (aged 17)	(Salvadoran Football Federation) Isidro Metapán
3	DF	Kiano Casamalhuapa	11 April 2006 (aged 16)	(United States Soccer Federation) FC Cincinnati
4	DF	Nestor Delgado	31 January 2006 (aged 17)	(Salvadoran Football Federation) Turín FESA
5	DF	Kristian Villalobos	27 February 2007 (aged 15)	(United States Soccer Federation) Los Angeles FC
6	MF	Elder Figueroa	26 March 2006 (aged 16)	(Salvadoran Football Federation) Fuerte San Francisco
7	DF	Nelson Diaz	4 July 2006 (aged 16)	(Salvadoran Football Federation) San Carlos
8	MF	Walter Menjivar (captain)	1 June 2006 (aged 16)	(Salvadoran Football Federation) Chalatenango
9	FW	Christopher Argueta	14 January 2007 (aged 16)	(United States Soccer Federation) D.C. United
10	MF	Cristopher Arias	19 January 2007 (aged 16)	(United States Soccer Federation) New York City FC
11	FW	Raul Avalos	13 February 2007 (aged 15)	(United States Soccer Federation) D.C. United
12	MF	Adrian Aguilar	28 March 2007 (aged 15)	(United States Soccer Federation) Los Angeles FC
13	DF	Diego Vasquez	17 December 2006 (aged 16)	(United States Soccer Federation) D.C. United
14	FW	Bryan Vasquez	12 June 2006 (aged 16)	(United States Soccer Federation) New York Red Bulls
15	DF	Michael Ventura	4 March 2006 (aged 16)	(Salvadoran Football Federation) Municipal
16	FW	Wilber Diaz	16 May 2007 (aged 15)	(Salvadoran Football Federation) Turín FESA
17	DF	Anderson Portillo	5 August 2007 (aged 15)	(Salvadoran Football Federation) Cacahuatique
18	GK	Alexander Aguilar	1 April 2007 (aged 15)	(United States Soccer Federation) D.C. United
19	FW	Jair Asprilla	3 March 2006 (aged 16)	(National Football Federation of Guatemala) Municipal
20	DF	Jonathan Aguirre	24 February 2007 (aged 15)	(United States Soccer Federation) D.C. United

=== Suriname ===
The Suriname squad of 20 players was confirmed by CONCACAF on 6 February 2023.

Head coach: Aldrin de Baas

No.	Pos.	Player	Date of birth (age)	Club
1	GK	Tyron Chaar	10 August 2007 (aged 15)	(Royal Dutch Football Association) Volendam
2	DF	Jahlani Fonteni (captain)	15 May 2006 (aged 16)	(Royal Dutch Football Association) Utrecht
3	MF	D’Angelo Lobman	2 February 2007 (aged 16)	(Royal Dutch Football Association) Ajax
4	DF	Yamano Olfers	2 August 2006 (aged 16)	(Royal Dutch Football Association) Telstar
5	FW	Rojendro Oudsten	12 November 2007 (aged 15)	(Royal Dutch Football Association) Telstar
6	DF	Thierry Warso	5 January 2006 (aged 17)	(Surinamese Football Association) Leo Victor
7	FW	Sanyika Puljhun	31 July 2007 (aged 15)	(Royal Dutch Football Association) Ajax
8	MF	Lebron Campagne	16 August 2007 (aged 15)	(Royal Dutch Football Association) Utrecht
9	FW	Jemairo Goodett	27 January 2007 (aged 16)	(Royal Dutch Football Association) Almere City
10	FW	Riguelme Antomoi	19 August 2006 (aged 16)	(Surinamese Football Association) PVV
11	MF	Kenzo Riedewald	24 February 2007 (aged 15)	(Royal Dutch Football Association) Ajax
12	DF	Chamylo Kartosontono	3 April 2006 (aged 16)	(Surinamese Football Association) PVV
13	DF	Pharell Rigters	16 December 2006 (aged 16)	(Surinamese Football Association) PVV
14	DF	Ichael Dalfour	19 January 2006 (aged 17)	(Surinamese Football Association) Robinhood
15	FW	Faraji Amelo	22 May 2006 (aged 16)	(Surinamese Football Association) Transvaal
16	DF	Shane Francis	22 June 2006 (aged 16)	(Surinamese Football Association) ABSO
17	MF	Serfinjo Pinas	14 September 2006 (aged 16)	(Surinamese Football Association) Transvaal
18	MF	Denfinjo Pinas	14 September 2006 (aged 16)	(Surinamese Football Association) Transvaal
19	FW	Darell Sijpenhof	18 October 2006 (aged 16)	(Surinamese Football Association) Robinhood
20	GK	Chanero Bona	28 July 2006 (aged 16)	(Surinamese Football Association) Voorwaarts

== Knockout stage ==
=== Bermuda ===
Bermuda announced a 23-man provisional list on 25 January 2023. The final list of 20 players was announced on 2 February 2023.

Head coach: Cecoy Robinson

No.	Pos.	Player	Date of birth (age)	Club
1	GK	Keyan Webb	26 October 2006 (aged 16)	(Bermuda Football Association) Robin Hood
2	FW	Jutorre Burgess	10 August 2006 (aged 16)	(The Football Association) Brooke House College
3	FW	Malachi Henry	16 January 2006 (aged 17)	(Bermuda Football Association) Warwick Archers
4	DF	Luke Fulton	23 November 2006 (aged 16)	(Bermuda Football Association) Warwick Archers
5	DF	Nayan Grant	7 September 2007 (aged 15)	(The Football Association) Brooke House College
6	MF	Jaidyn Robinson	3 May 2006 (aged 16)	(Bermuda Football Association) Bascome Bermuda
7	MF	Hayden Dill	22 February 2006 (aged 16)	(Bermuda Football Association) PHC Zebras
8	DF	Jannis Roberts	5 April 2006 (aged 16)	(United States Soccer Federation) IMG Academy
9	MF	Xahvi DeRoza	18 March 2007 (aged 15)	(United States Soccer Federation) South Kent
10	DF	Daion Swan-DeSilva	2 January 2007 (aged 16)	(Bermuda Football Association) Hamilton Parish WC
11	FW	Malachai Belboda	8 April 2007 (aged 15)	(The Football Association) Fulham
12	GK	Nathaniel Swan	5 May 2006 (aged 16)	(The Football Association) Brooke House College
13	DF	Gianni Burgess	3 April 2006 (aged 16)	(The Football Association) Brooke House College
14	MF	Qu'ran Raynor	17 April 2007 (aged 15)	(Bermuda Football Association) Somerset Trojans
15	DF	Keiaron Bean	10 March 2006 (aged 16)	(The Football Association) Brooke House College
16	MF	Enoch Joseph	8 August 2006 (aged 16)	(United States Soccer Federation) South Kent
17	DF	Kaej Stovell	2 August 2006 (aged 16)	(The Football Association) IDA
18	FW	Daqaio Stewart	14 April 2007 (aged 15)	(Bermuda Football Association) Somerset Trojans
19	FW	Paris-Mitchell Robinson	31 January 2006 (aged 17)	(The Football Association) IDA
20	DF	Chance Eve	14 November 2006 (aged 16)	(Bermuda Football Association) Warwick Archers

=== Dominican Republic ===
Dominican Republic announced their squad of 20 players on 1 February 2023.

Head coach: Mariano Pérez Tejada

No.	Pos.	Player	Date of birth (age)	Club
1	GK	Edwin Frías	18 May 2006 (aged 16)	(Dominican Football Federation) Cibao
2	DF	Abraham Mejía	8 July 2006 (aged 16)	(Dominican Football Federation) Santa Fe
3	DF	Francisco Reyes	28 March 2006 (aged 16)	(Royal Dutch Football Association) Volendam
4	DF	Josué Núñez	10 January 2006 (aged 17)	(Dominican Football Federation) Cibao
5	DF	Raffaele De Lucia	12 August 2007 (aged 15)	(Italian Football Federation) Pro Vercelli
6	MF	Álvaro Cabrera	18 May 2006 (aged 16)	(Dominican Football Federation) Fundación Marcet
7	FW	Carlos Sarante	3 June 2006 (aged 16)	(Dominican Football Federation) Atlético Los Villanos
8	MF	Lucas Bretón	20 November 2006 (aged 16)	(Dominican Football Federation) Cibao
9	FW	Bladimil Jackson	8 June 2006 (aged 16)	(United States Soccer Federation) Williston Northampton School
10	MF	Nicolás Cruz	14 February 2006 (aged 16)	(Royal Spanish Football Federation) CF Damm
11	FW	Rionaldo Guzmán	7 February 2006 (aged 17)	(Swedish Football Association) Örebro SK
12	GK	Diego Peña	3 March 2006 (aged 16)	(United States Soccer Federation) Hun School of Princeton
13	DF	Arturo Peña	9 November 2006 (aged 16)	(Dominican Football Federation) Barça Academy
14	DF	Sebastián Mejía	6 January 2006 (aged 17)	(United States Soccer Federation) Taft School
15	MF	Gabriel Brugal	17 July 2006 (aged 16)	(Dominican Football Federation) Atlántico
16	MF	Pablo Pujols	31 March 2006 (aged 16)	(United States Soccer Federation) FC Cincinnati
17	FW	Juan David Peralta	20 January 2006 (aged 17)	(Royal Spanish Football Federation) Getafe
18	DF	Marlon Mena	5 October 2006 (aged 16)	(Italian Football Federation) Parma
19	MF	Thomas Rourke	21 March 2006 (aged 16)	(United States Soccer Federation) Queensboro FC
20	FW	Ayden Kokoszca	6 August 2006 (aged 16)	(United States Soccer Federation) Williston Northampton School

=== Nicaragua ===
The Nicaragua final squad of 20 players was confirmed by CONCACAF on 6 February 2023. However, the Nicaraguan Football Federation announced an updated list of 19 players on 15 February 2023 with midfielder Lucíano Lanzas being ruled out from the squad and defender Gabriel Goussen and midfielder Daniel Miranda being replaced by Gian Lucas Moretti and Luis Carrión respectively.

Head coach: Tyron Acevedo

No.	Pos.	Player	Date of birth (age)	Club
1	GK	Fernando Moreno	18 May 2006 (aged 16)	(Nicaraguan Football Federation) Somotillo
2	DF	Alberto Alemán	10 August 2006 (aged 16)	(Nicaraguan Football Federation) Xilotepelt
3	DF	Fernando Parrales	26 February 2006 (aged 16)	(Nicaraguan Football Federation) Juventus
4	DF	Joaquin D'Escoto	14 February 2006 (aged 16)	(United States Soccer Federation) De Anza Force
5	MF	Joab Gutiérrez (captain)	31 March 2006 (aged 16)	(Nicaraguan Football Federation) Real Estelí
6	DF	Óscar Rocha	13 January 2006 (aged 17)	(Nicaraguan Football Federation) Deportivo San Rafael
7	MF	Lucas Bellomo	10 January 2006 (aged 17)	(United States Soccer Federation) IMG Academy
8	MF	Stanly Rivas	27 June 2006 (aged 16)	(Nicaraguan Football Federation) Lobos Premier
9	FW	Juban Uriarte	6 February 2008 (aged 15)	(Nicaraguan Football Federation) Real Estelí
11	FW	Oliver Bello	17 April 2006 (aged 16)	(Nicaraguan Football Federation) Real Estelí
12	GK	Laureano Nicaragua	14 February 2006 (aged 16)	(Nicaraguan Football Federation) Managua
13	FW	Andres Reyes	10 May 2007 (aged 15)	(Nicaraguan Football Federation) Deportivo Michigan
14	DF	Richard Gómez	14 April 2006 (aged 16)	(Nicaraguan Football Federation) Real Estelí
15	FW	Jacob Aguirre	7 April 2007 (aged 15)	(United States Soccer Federation) Santa Clara
16	MF	Oscar Navarrete	23 October 2006 (aged 16)	(Nicaraguan Football Federation) Xilotepelt
17	DF	Gian Lucas Moretti		(Nicaraguan Football Federation) Real Estelí
18	MF	Luis Carrión		(Nicaraguan Football Federation) Real Estelí
19	DF	Marcos García	7 November 2006 (aged 16)	(Nicaraguan Football Federation) Walter Ferretti
20	FW	Oliver Orozco	28 September 2007 (aged 15)	(Nicaraguan Football Federation) Juventus

=== Puerto Rico ===
Puerto Rico announced their final squad of 20 players on 4 February 2023.

Head coach: Marco Vélez

No.	Pos.	Player	Date of birth (age)	Club
1	GK	Sebastián Cuevas	23 May 2006 (aged 16)	(Puerto Rican Football Federation) Mirabelli
2	DF	Eitan Solomiany	8 December 2006 (aged 16)	(Puerto Rican Football Federation) Bayamón
3	DF	Adrián Rosario	12 April 2007 (aged 15)	(United States Soccer Federation) Inter Miami CF
4	FW	Antonio Delgado	18 February 2007 (aged 15)	(United States Soccer Federation) Chicago FC United
5	MF	Ian Charles	8 February 2007 (aged 16)	(United States Soccer Federation) FC Dallas Academy
6	DF	Alejandro Viera	31 August 2006 (aged 16)	(Puerto Rican Football Federation) Mirabelli
7	FW	Carlos Siaca	18 January 2006 (aged 17)	(Puerto Rican Football Federation) Bayamón
8	MF	Andrés López	1 May 2007 (aged 15)	(United States Soccer Federation) Loudoun United
9	FW	Joel Rosa	7 April 2007 (aged 15)	(United States Soccer Federation) Tampa Bay United
10	MF	Justin Blanco	19 February 2007 (aged 15)	(United States Soccer Federation) Queensboro FC
11	MF	Sebastián Sime	17 January 2007 (aged 16)	(Puerto Rican Football Federation) Mirabelli
12	GK	Franco Ramos	10 April 2006 (aged 16)	(Puerto Rican Football Federation) Atlético San Juan
13	DF	Abraham Nelson	23 March 2006 (aged 16)	(Puerto Rican Football Federation) Puerto Rico Surf
14	DF	Juan Torres	2 October 2006 (aged 16)	(United States Soccer Federation) Solar SC
15	FW	Samuel Byron	26 March 2007 (aged 15)	(United States Soccer Federation) Nashville SC Academy
16	DF	Gabriel Rosario	12 April 2006 (aged 16)	(United States Soccer Federation) Orlando City SC
17	MF	Edgardo Vázquez	24 October 2006 (aged 16)	(United States Soccer Federation) Tampa Bay United
18	DF	Adrián Prado	26 April 2006 (aged 16)	(Puerto Rican Football Federation) San Juan
19	FW	Jorge Vázquez	27 June 2006 (aged 16)	(United States Soccer Federation) Orlando City Seminole
20	FW	Leonard Avilés Jr.	26 January 2006 (aged 17)	(United States Soccer Federation) New York Red Bulls Academy
