= Mexico national under-23 football team =

National association football team

Mexico Olympic
- Nickname(s): El Tri; El Tricolor (The Tricolor)
- Association: Federación Mexicana de Fútbol
- Confederation: CONCACAF (North America)
- Head coach: Eduardo Arce
- FIFA code: MEX
First colours	Second colours

First international
- Spain 7–1 Mexico (Amsterdam, Netherlands; 30 May 1928)

Biggest win
- Mexico 7–1 Trinidad and Tobago (Carson, United States; 23 March 2012)

Biggest defeat
- East Germany 7–0 Mexico (Munich, West Germany; 5 September 1972) Records for competitive matches only

Summer Olympics
- Appearances: 6 (first in 1992)
- Best result: Gold medalist (2012)

Pan American Games
- Appearances: 6 (first in 1999)
- Best result: Gold medalist (1999, 2011)
Medal record
Olympic Games
Gold medal – first place	2012 London	Team
Bronze medal – third place	2020 Tokyo	Team
Pan American Games
Gold medal – first place	1999 Winnipeg	Team
Gold medal – first place	2011 Guadalajara	Team
Silver medal – second place	2015 Toronto	Team
Bronze medal – third place	2003 Santo Domingo	Team
Bronze medal – third place	2019 Lima	Team
Bronze medal – third place	2023 Santiago	Team

The Mexico national under-23 football team (also known as Mexico Olympic football team) represents Mexico in under-23 international football competitions such as the Olympic Games and Pan American Games. The selection is limited to players under the age of 23, except for the Olympic Games which allows the men's team up to three overage players. The team is controlled by the Mexican Football Federation (FMF), the governing body of football in Mexico.

Since 1992, the under-23 team has participated in six Olympic tournaments, winning the gold medal in 2012.

== Results and fixtures ==
The following matches have been played within the past 12 months.

Win Draw Loss Fixture

=== 2026 ===
28 March Friendly	Pumas UNAM (Mexico)	4–1	Mexico	Toluca, Mexico
		Report	Tello	Stadium: Centro de Alto Rendimiento

30 March Friendly	Mexico	4–0	(Mexico) Toluca U-21	Toluca, Mexico
	Leyva; Uribe x2; Vázquez	Report		Stadium: Centro de Alto Rendimiento

8 June Friendly	Mexico	3–1	(Mexico) Querétaro U-21	Toluca, Mexico
	Pachuca; Tello; Moxica	Report		Stadium: Centro de Alto Rendimiento

16 July Friendly	Correcaminos UAT (Mexico)	2–2	Mexico	Ciudad Victoria, Mexico
	Guzmán; Torres	Report	Levy; López	Stadium: Estadio Marte R. Gómez

21 July Friendly	Mexico	1–0	(Mexico) Atlante	Toluca, Mexico
	Levy	Report		Stadium: Centro de Alto Rendimiento

30 July 2026 Central American and Caribbean Games	Mexico	1–0	Venezuela	Santiago de los Caballeros, Dominican Republic
14:00	Moxica 87'	Report		Stadium: Estadio Cibao FC; Attendance: Maykell Ramos (Panama)

30 July 2026 Central American and Caribbean Games	Dominican Republic	1–1	Mexico	Moca, Dominican Republic
19:00	Roces 18'	Report	Pérez 77'	Stadium: Estadio Moca 85; Attendance: Jordan Chaibriant (France)

3 August 2026 Central American and Caribbean Games	Mexico	4–1	Guatemala	Santiago de los Caballeros, Dominican Republic
19:00	Jiménez 14', 47', 55'; González 58'	Report	Hernández 2'	Stadium: Estadio Cibao FC; Referee: Arron Stamper (Aruba)

5 August 2026 Central American and Caribbean Games Semi-Finals	Mexico	4–0	Panama	Moca, Dominican Republic
15:00	García 8'; Moxica 17', 32'; Vázquez 90+1'	Report		Stadium: Estadio Moca 85; Attendance: Kesla Anderson (Jamaica)

7 August 2026 Central American and Caribbean Games Final	Mexico	2–2 (2–3 p)	Venezuela	Santiago de los Caballeros, Dominican Republic
19:00	Levy 24', 45+3'	Report	Carrero 1'; Claut 30'	Stadium: Estadio Cibao FC; Attendance: Jordan Chaibriant (France)
	Penalties
	Moxica (penalty missed); Jiménez (penalty scored); García (penalty missed); Navarrete (penalty scored); Ochoa (penalty missed)		(penalty scored) Lozano; (penalty scored) Pita; (penalty missed) Zamora; (penalty scored) Uribe

2 October Friendly	Pachuca (Mexico)	4–0	Mexico	Pachuca, Mexico
	Rondón; Isais; Pizarro; Vallejo	Report		Stadium: Estadio Hidalgo

5 October Friendly	Mexico	2–2	(Mexico) Atlante	Toluca, Mexico
	González; Heredia-Randen	Report		Stadium: Centro de Alto Rendimiento

14 November Friendly	South Korea	v	Mexico	Cheonan, South Korea
				Stadium: Cheonan Football Center

17 November Friendly	South Korea	v	Mexico	Cheonan, South Korea
				Stadium: Cheonan Stadium

== Coaching staff ==
=== Current coaching staff ===
Position	Name
Manager	(Mexico) Eduardo Arce
Assistant coaches	(Mexico) Jorge Hernández
Assistant coaches	(Mexico) Yasser Corona
Fitness coach	(Mexico) Juan Alberto Cerda
Goalkeeper coach	(Mexico) Alfredo Talavera
Doctor	(Mexico) Roberto Robles
Physiotherapist	(Mexico) Miguel Márquez
Kit man	(Mexico) Bernabe Zaragoza

== Players ==
=== Current squad ===
The following players were called up for the friendlies against South Korea national under-23 football team on 14 and 17 November 2026.

No.	Pos.	Player	Date of birth (age)	Caps	Goals	Club
	GK	César Camacho	21 September 2006 (age 20)	0	0	(Mexican Football Federation) Pachuca
	GK	Pablo Lara	29 June 2005 (age 21)	0	0	(Mexican Football Federation) UNAM
	GK	Emmanuel Ochoa	5 May 2005 (age 21)	0	0	(Mexican Football Federation) Cruz Azul
	DF	Everardo López	23 March 2005 (age 21)	3	0	(Mexican Football Federation) Toluca
	DF	Éder López	1 January 2006 (age 20)	0	0	(Mexican Football Federation) Juárez
	DF	Franco Rossano	27 July 2005 (age 21)	0	0	(Mexican Football Federation) América
	DF	Francisco Méndez	4 May 2005 (age 21)	0	0	(Mexican Football Federation) Necaxa
	DF	Diego Ochoa	20 April 2005 (age 21)	0	0	(Mexican Football Federation) Necaxa
	DF	Rodrigo Pachuca	24 July 2005 (age 21)	0	0	(Mexican Football Federation) Puebla
	DF	Geovanni Pérez	27 October 2005 (age 21)	0	0	(Mexican Football Federation) Santos Laguna
	MF	Ariel Castro	7 January 2005 (age 21)	0	0	(Mexican Football Federation) Cruz Azul
	MF	Iker Fimbres	2 June 2005 (age 21)	0	0	(Mexican Football Federation) Monterrey
	MF	Luis Gómez	2 January 2007 (age 19)	0	0	(Mexican Football Federation) Santos Laguna
	MF	Rogelio González	5 February 2005 (age 21)	0	0	(Mexican Football Federation) Cruz Azul
	MF	Andreas Heredia-Randen	22 February 2006 (age 20)	0	0	(Norwegian Football Federation) Strømsgodset
	MF	Jesús Lara	9 February 2005 (age 21)	0	0	(Mexican Football Federation) León
	MF	Elías Montiel	7 October 2005 (age 21)	0	0	(Mexican Football Federation) Atlas
	MF	Yael Padilla	19 December 2005 (age 20)	0	0	(Mexican Football Federation) Tijuana
	MF	Diego Sánchez	12 April 2005 (age 21)	0	0	(Mexican Football Federation) Tigres UANL
	MF	Juan Pablo Uribe	27 June 2006 (age 20)	0	0	(Mexican Football Federation) Tapatío
	MF	Octavio Vázquez	28 May 2005 (age 21)	0	0	(Mexican Football Federation) Atlante
	FW	Tahiel Jiménez	22 January 2006 (age 20)	0	0	(Mexican Football Federation) Santos Laguna
	FW	Omar Moreno	30 January 2005 (age 21)	0	0	(Mexican Football Federation) Puebla
	FW	Joaquín Moxica	27 January 2006 (age 20)	0	0	(Mexican Football Federation) Atlante

=== Recent call-ups ===
The following players have also been called up within the last twelve months.

Pos.	Player	Date of birth (age)	Caps	Goals	Club	Latest call-up
GK	Eros García	23 July 2005 (age 21)	0	0	(Mexico) Toluca	v. (Mexico) Toluca U21, 30 March 2026
DF	Ángel Chávez	19 February 2005 (age 21)	0	0	(Mexico) Tapatío	v. (Mexico) Atlante, 30 March 2026
DF	Sebastián Aceves	20 December 2005 (age 20)	0	0	(Mexico) Toluca	2026 Central American and Caribbean Games
DF	Jaziel Mendoza	20 May 2005 (age 21)	0	0	(Mexico) Cruz Azul Hidalgo	2026 Central American and Caribbean Games
DF	César Bustos	27 August 2005 (age 21)	0	0	(Mexico) Monterrey	June 2026 training camp
DF	Ángel Leyva	13 October 2006 (age 20)	0	0	(Mexico) Puebla	v. (Mexico) Toluca U21, 30 March 2026
DF	Carlo Soldati	6 July 2005 (age 21)	0	0	(Mexico) Tapatío	v. (Mexico) Atlante, 30 March 2026
MF	Omar Gálvez	18 April 2006 (age 20)	0	0	(Mexico) Monterrey	v. (Mexico) Atlante, 30 March 2026
MF	Marco Fava	7 April 2005 (age 21)	0	0	(Mexico) Pachuca	2026 Central American and Caribbean Games
MF	Gael García	4 June 2008 (age 18)	0	0	(Mexico) Tapatío	2026 Central American and Caribbean Games
MF	Bernardo Parra	6 January 2005 (age 21)	0	0	(Mexico) Querétaro	2026 Central American and Caribbean Games
MF	Brandon Téllez	17 February 2005 (age 21)	0	0	(Mexico) Tapatío	2026 Central American and Caribbean Games
MF	Israel Tello	18 January 2006 (age 20)	0	0	(Mexico) Necaxa	2026 Central American and Caribbean Games
MF	Diego Valdez	8 January 2006 (age 20)	0	0	(Mexico) Cruz Azul Hidalgo	2026 Central American and Caribbean Games
MF	Diego Covarrubias	8 February 2007 (age 19)	0	0	(Mexico) Guadalajara	June 2026 training camp
MF	Amaury Morales	3 December 2005 (age 20)	0	0	(Mexico) Cruz Azul	June 2026 training camp
MF	Stanley García	22 September 2006 (age 20)	0	0	(Mexico) UNAM	v. (Mexico) Toluca U21, 30 March 2026
MF	Diego Latorre	18 July 2005 (age 21)	0	0	(Mexico) Tapatío	v. (Mexico) Toluca U21, 30 March 2026
MF	Jassiel Medrano	10 March 2005 (age 21)	0	0	(Mexico) UNAM	v. (Mexico) Toluca U21, 30 March 2026
MF	Luis Navarrete	23 August 2005 (age 21)	0	0	(Mexico) Toluca	v. (Mexico) Toluca U21, 30 March 2026
MF	Cristian Reyes	10 April 2006 (age 20)	0	0	(Mexico) Monterrey	v. (Mexico) Toluca U21, 30 March 2026
MF	Allen Rojas	6 February 2006 (age 20)	0	0	(Mexico) Monterrey	v. (Mexico) Toluca U21, 30 March 2026
MF	Emmanuel Sánchez	10 February 2006 (age 20)	0	0	(Mexico) Cruz Azul Hidalgo	v. (Mexico) Toluca U21, 30 March 2026
MF	Jesús Serrato	21 December 2005 (age 20)	0	0	(Mexico) Atlas	v. (Mexico) Toluca U21, 30 March 2026
FW	Heriberto Jurado	3 January 2005 (age 21)	5	2	(Mexico) Puebla	v. (Mexico) Atlante, 30 March 2026
FW	Gael Álvarez	9 March 2006 (age 20)	0	0	(Mexico) Pachuca	v. (Mexico) Atlante, 30 March 2026
FW	Alejandro Cárdenas	28 July 2006 (age 20)	0	0	(Mexico) América	v. (Mexico) Atlante, 30 March 2026
FW	Oswaldo Virgen	7 April 2005 (age 21)	0	0	(Mexico) Toluca	v. (Mexico) Atlante, 30 March 2026
FW	Mateo Levy	22 October 2006 (age 20)	0	0	(Mexico) Cruz Azul	2026 Central American and Caribbean Games

== Honours ==
Major competitions

- Summer Olympics
  - Gold medalists (1): 2012
  - Bronze medalists (1): 2020
- Pan American Games
  - Gold medalists (2): 1999, 2011
  - Silver medalists (1): 2015
  - Bronze medalists (3): 2003, 2019, 2023
- CONCACAF Olympic Qualifying Tournament
  - Winners (5): 1996, 2004, 2012, 2015, 2020
  - Runners-up (1): 1992
  - Third place (1): 2000

Other competitions

- Central American and Caribbean Games
  - Gold medalists (7): 1935, 1938, 1959, 1966, 1990, 2014, 2023
- Toulon Tournament
  - Winners (1): 2012
  - Runners-up (1): 2023
  - Third place (2): 1976, 2019
- Summer Universiade
  - Winners (1): 1979

== Competitive record ==
=== Olympic Games ===
Before 1984, the football tournament at the Olympic Games was played only by amateur athletes. In 1984, professionals were allowed to compete for the first time. Since 1992, the Olympic Games tournament has been an under-23 tournament, and since 1996, the squads were allowed to have a maximum of three over-aged players.

Summer Olympics record
Year	Result	Position	Pld	W	D	L	GF	GA	Squad
1928–1988	See Mexico national football team								
(Spain) 1992	Group stage	10th	3	0	3	0	3	3	Squad
(United States) 1996	Quarter-finals	7th	4	1	2	1	2	3	Squad
(Australia) 2000	Did not qualify								
(Greece) 2004	Group stage	10th	3	1	1	1	3	3	Squad
(China) 2008	Did not qualify								
(United Kingdom) 2012	Gold medal	1st	6	5	1	0	12	4	Squad
(Brazil) 2016	Group stage	9th	3	1	1	1	7	4	Squad
(Japan) 2020	Bronze medal	3rd	6	4	1	1	17	7	Squad
(France) 2024	Did not qualify								
(United States) 2028	Qualified								
(Australia) 2032	To be determined								
Total	1 gold medal	6/9	25	12	9	4	44	24	

All-time matches at the Summer Olympics
Year	Round	Opponent	Score	Result	Venue	City	Scorer(s)
(Spain) 1992	Group D	Denmark	1–1	D	La Romareda	Zaragoza	Rotllán
(Spain) 1992	Group D	Australia	1–1	D	Sarrià	Barcelona	Castañeda
(Spain) 1992	Group D	Ghana	1–1	D	Nova Creu Alta	Sabadell	Rotllán
(United States) 1996	Group C	Italy	1–0	W	Legion Field	Birmingham	Palencia
(United States) 1996	Group C	South Korea	0–0	D	Legion Field	Birmingham	
(United States) 1996	Group C	Ghana	1–1	D	Robert F. Kennedy Memorial	District of Columbia	Abundis
(United States) 1996	Quarter-finals	Nigeria	0–2	L	Legion Field	Birmingham	
(Greece) 2004	Group A	Mali	0–0	D	Panthessaliko	Volos	
(Greece) 2004	Group A	South Korea	0–1	L	Karaiskakis	Athens	
(Greece) 2004	Group A	Greece	3–2	W	Panthessaliko	Volos	Márquez ∙ Bravo (2)
(United Kingdom) 2012	Group B	South Korea	0–0	D	St James'	Newcastle	
(United Kingdom) 2012	Group B	Gabon	2–0	W	City of Coventry	Coventry	Dos Santos (2)
(United Kingdom) 2012	Group B	Switzerland	1–0	W	Millennium	Cardiff	Peralta
(United Kingdom) 2012	Quarter-finals	Senegal	4–2 (a.e.t.)	W	Wembley	London	Enríquez ∙ Aquino ∙ Dos Santos ∙ Herrera
(United Kingdom) 2012	Semi-finals	Japan	3–1	W	Wembley	London	Fabián ∙ Peralta ∙ Cortés
(United Kingdom) 2012	Final	Brazil	2–1	W	Wembley	London	Peralta (2)
(Brazil) 2016	Group C	Germany	2–2	D	Arena Fonte Nova	Salvador	Peralta ∙ Pizarro
(Brazil) 2016	Group C	Fiji	5–1	W	Arena Fonte Nova	Salvador	Gutiérrez (4) ∙ Salcedo
(Brazil) 2016	Group C	South Korea	0–1	L	Mané Garrincha	Brasília	
(Japan) 2020	Group A	France	4–1	W	Tokyo	Tokyo	Vega ∙ Córdova ∙ Antuna ∙ Aguirre
(Japan) 2020	Group A	Japan	1–2	L	Saitama	Saitama	Alvarado
(Japan) 2020	Group A	South Africa	3–0	W	Sapporo Dome	Sapporo	Vega ∙ Romo ∙ Martín
(Japan) 2020	Quarter-finals	South Korea	6–3	W	Internantional Yokohama	Yokohama	Martín (2) ∙ Romo ∙ Córdova (2) ∙ Aguirre
(Japan) 2020	Semi-finals	Brazil	0–0 (1–4 p)	D	Kashima	Kashima	
(Japan) 2020	Third place match	Japan	3–1	W	Saitama	Saitama	Córdova ∙ Vásquez ∙ Vega

=== Pre-Olympic Tournament ===
Pre-Olympic Tournament record
Year	Result	Position	Pld	W	D	L	GF	GA	Squad
1964–1988	Mexico national football team								

=== Pan American Games ===
Since 1999, the Pan American Games football tournament has been an under-23 tournament.

Pan American Games record
Year	Result	Position	Pld	W	D	L	GF	GA	Squad
(Canada) 1999	Gold medal	1st	6	4	2	0	14	5	Squad
(Dominican Republic) 2003	Bronze medal	3rd	5	1	2	1	7	7	Squad
(Brazil) 2007	Bronze medal	3rd	5	3	2	0	6	1	Squad
(Mexico) 2011	Gold medal	1st	5	4	1	0	12	4	Squad
(Canada) 2015	Silver medal	2nd	5	3	1	1	8	5	Squad
(Peru) 2019	Bronze medal	3rd	5	3	2	0	7	2	Squad
(Chile) 2023	Bronze medal	3rd	5	2	1	2	5	2	Squad
Total	2 Gold medals	N/A	36	20	11	4	59	26	

*Draws include knockout matches decided on penalty kicks.

All-time matches at the Pan American Games
Year	Round	Opponent	Score	Result	Venue	City	Scorer(s)
(Canada) 1999	Group A	Trinidad and Tobago	2–1	W	Winnipeg Soccer Complex	Winnipeg	
(Canada) 1999	Group A	Guatemala	1–3	W	Winnipeg Soccer Complex	Winnipeg	
(Canada) 1999	Group A	Costa Rica	2–2	D	Winnipeg Soccer Complex	Winnipeg	
(Canada) 1999	Group A	Canada	0–0	D	Winnipeg Soccer Complex	Winnipeg	
(Canada) 1999	Semi-finals	United States	4–0	W	Winnipeg Soccer Complex	Winnipeg	
(Canada) 1999	Final	Honduras	1–3	W	Winnipeg Soccer Complex	Winnipeg	
(Dominican Republic) 2003	Group A	Guatemala	1–1	D	Mirador Este	Santo Domingo	
(Dominican Republic) 2003	Group A	Paraguay	1–3	W	Mirador Este	Santo Domingo	
(Dominican Republic) 2003	Group A	Argentina	3–4	L	Mirador Este	Santo Domingo	
(Dominican Republic) 2003	Semi-final	Brazil	1–0	L	Olímpico	Santo Domingo	
(Dominican Republic) 2003	Third place	Colombia	0–0 (a.e.t.) (4–5 pen.)	W	Olímpico	Santo Domingo	

== See also ==
- Mexico national football team
- Mexico national under-20 football team
- Mexico national under-17 football team
- Mexico women's national football team
- Mexico national beach football team
- Mexico national futsal team
