= Victor Fung =

Victor Fung may refer to:

- Victor Fung (businessman) (born 1945), Hong Kong businessman
- Victor Fung (footballer) (born 2007), Venezuelan footballer
