= Stephano Carrillo =

Mexican footballer (born 2006)

Personal information
- Full name: Stephano Emmanuel Carrillo Calderón
- Date of birth: 7 March 2006 (age 20)
- Place of birth: Cuencamé, Durango, Mexico
- Height: 1.84 m (6 ft 0 in)
- Position: Forward

Team information
- Current team: Feyenoord

Youth career
- 2018–2024: Santos Laguna
- 2025–: Feyenoord

Senior career*
Years	Team	Apps	(Gls)
2024–2025	Santos Laguna	18	(1)
2025–	Feyenoord	3	(0)
2025–2026	→ Dordrecht (loan)	33	(4)

International career^{‡}
2022	Mexico U16	4	(1)
2021–2023	Mexico U17	33	(26)
2024–	Mexico U20	9	(1)
Medal record
Men's football
Representing Mexico
CONCACAF U-20 Championship
Winner	2024 Mexico
CONCACAF U-17 Championship
Winner	2023 Guatemala
- * Club domestic league appearances and goals as of 28 April 2026 ‡ National team caps and goals as of 28 September 2025

Stephano Emmanuel Carrillo Calderón (born 7 March 2006) is a Mexican professional footballer who plays as a forward for Eredivisie club Feyenoord and for the Mexico national under-20 team.

== Club career ==
Carillo was born in Cuencamé, near Gómez Palacio in the Mexican state of Durango. He joined the academy of Santos Laguna, and made his professional debut on 18 February 2024.

On 5 February 2025, Carrillo joined Eredivisie club Feyenoord on a four-and-a-half-year contract.

== International career ==
Carrillo was called up to Mexico's under-16 squad for the 2022 edition of the Montaigu Tournament, where he scored once against Belgium as Mexico finished in eighth position.

Having represented Mexico's under-17 team since 2021, Carrillo was called up to the squad for the 2023 CONCACAF U-17 Championship. Having scored twice in Mexico's opening 9–0 win against Curaçao, he added to his tally once more in the group stage, as Mexico beat Guatemala 2–0. A double against Nicaragua, followed by goals in Mexico's quarter and semi-final wins against El Salvador and Panama, respectively, saw Carrillo tied with American Keyrol Figueroa for top-scorer in the tournament, with the two meeting in the competition's final. Mexico went on to win the final against the United States 3–1, with Carrillo scoring his nation's first goal, earning him the 'top-scorer' accolade.

Following the tournament, Carrillo scored in a 2–1 friendly loss to the United Arab Emirates as part of Mexico's tour of Dubai. He followed this up with the only goal in a 1–0 against Saudi Arabia, but could not help Mexico overcome the Netherlands, as the Dutch won 4–1.

== Style of play ==
A tall, strong forward, Carrillo earned comparisons to fellow Mexican striker Raúl Jiménez, with Santos Laguna youth coach Guillermo Hernández stating that the two have similar technique. Hernández also compared his work-rate to that of former Real Madrid and Mexico striker Hugo Sánchez, and said of Carrillo: "he always asks for advice on what to do, he is a very hard-working boy and in that, he is an exemplary boy."

== Personal life ==
Carrillo is a fan of Marvel Comics character Spider-Man, and after receiving advice from his father that he should celebrate his goals in a memorable way, he adopted Spider-Man's "web shooting" action, touching his middle and ring fingers to his palm.

== Career statistics ==
=== Club ===
As of match played 6 April 2026

Appearances and goals by club, season and competition
Club	Season	League			Cup		Continental		Other		Total	
Club	Season	Division	Apps	Goals	Apps	Goals	Apps	Goals	Apps	Goals	Apps	Goals
Santos Laguna	2023–24	Liga MX	6	1	–		–		–		6	1
Santos Laguna	2024–25	Liga MX	12	0	–		—		—		12	0
Santos Laguna	Total		18	1	—		—		—		18	1
Feyenoord	2024–25	Eredivisie	3	0	–		–		–		3	0
Dordrecht (loan)	2025–26	Eerste Divisie	31	4	1	0	–		–		32	4
Career total			52	5	1	0	0	0	0	0	53	5

== Honours ==
Mexico

- CONCACAF U-17 Championship: 2023
- CONCACAF U-20 Championship: 2024

Individual

- CONCACAF Under-17 Championship Golden Boot: 2023
- CONCACAF Under-17 Championship Best XI: 2023
