= Martín Krug =

Panamanian footballer (born 2006)

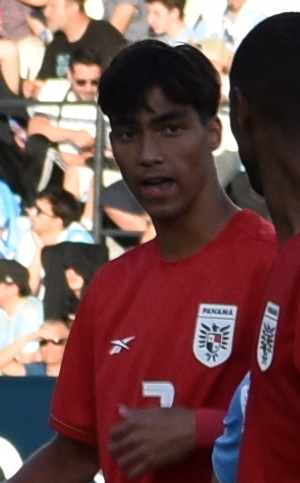
- Krug with Panama in 2024

Personal information
- Full name: Martín Wilhelm Krug
- Date of birth: 9 July 2006 (age 20)
- Place of birth: Chicago, Illinois, United States
- Height: 1.92 m (6 ft 4 in)
- Position: Centre-back

Team information
- Current team: Juventud Torremolinos (on loan from Levante)
- Number: 3

Youth career
- 2011–2022: iProSkills Academy
- 2022–2025: Levante

Senior career*
Years	Team	Apps	(Gls)
2024–2026	Levante B	43	(0)
2025–	Levante	0	(0)
2026–	→ Juventud Torremolinos (loan)	3	(0)

International career^{‡}
2023	Panama U17	8	(0)
2024–	Panama U20	7	(0)
2024–	Panama	4	(0)
- * Club domestic league appearances and goals as of 21 September 2026 ‡ National team caps and goals as of 23:12, 5 October 2026 (UTC)

Martín Wilhelm Krug (born 9 July 2006) is a professional footballer who plays as center-back for Spanish club Juventud Torremolinos, on loan from Levante. Born in the United States, he plays for the Panama national team.

== Club career ==
Krug started playing football at iProSkills Academy in Chicago at the age of 5. Martin captained the U-15 team as a center back at the same academy. In 2022, he moved to Spain to join the youth academy of Levante. In the summer of 2024, he extended his contract with Levante and was promoted to their reserve team Atlético Levante.

On 1 September 2026, Krug was loaned to Primera Federación side Juventud Torremolinos, for one year.

== International career ==
Krug represented the Panama U17s at the 2023 CONCACAF U-17 Championship in February 2023. That same year in November he made the final squad for the Panama U17s at the 2023 FIFA U-17 World Cup.

Krug made his debut with the senior Panama national team as a substitute in a friendly 1–0 loss to Paraguay on 16 June 2024. He was part of the provisional squad for the 2024 Copa América.

== Personal life ==
Krug was born in Chicago, Illinois to a German-American father and Panamanian mother. His twin brother, Frederick, is also a youth international for Panama.

Krug played under two coaches in high school at Notre Dame College Prep: Micheal Smith and Thomas Crowley. He often states in interviews that Coach Crowley influenced him to be the player he is today.

== Playing style ==
Martin Krug is primarily a center-back, known for his versatility, who is calm and precise and can dictate tempo from the back. He is prepared for anything on the pitch, and is good at anticipating plays. He is also able to play as a defensive midfielder.

== Career statistics ==
=== Club ===
As of match played 21 September 2026

Appearances and goals by club, season and competition
Club	Season	League			Cup		Europe		Other		Total	
Club	Season	Division	Apps	Goals	Apps	Goals	Apps	Goals	Apps	Goals	Apps	Goals
Levante B	2024–25	Tercera Federación	19	0	—		—		—		19	0
Levante B	2025–26	Tercera Federación	0	0	—		—		4 (Note: Appearances in 2026 ercera Federación play-offs)	0	4	0
Levante B	Total		19	0	—		—		4	0	23	0
Juventud Torremolinos (loan)	2026–27	Primera Federación	3	0	—		—		—		3	0
Career total			22	0	0	0	0	0	4	0	26	0

=== International ===
As of match played 5 October 2026

Appearances and goals by national team and year
National team	Year	Apps	Goals
Panama	2024	1	0
Panama	2026	3	0
Total		4	0
