= Guadeloupe national under-17 football team =

National association football team

Guadeloupe U-17s
- Nickname(s): Les Gwada Boys (The Gwada Boys)
- Association: Ligue Guadeloupéenne de Football
- Confederation: CONCACAF (North America)
- Sub-confederation: CFU (Caribbean)
- Head coach: Alexis Moulin
- Captain: Daniel Valmont
- Home stadium: Stade René Serge Nabajoth
- FIFA code: GLP
First colours	Second colours	Third colours

First international
- Guadeloupe 3–0 Cayman Islands (Kingston, Jamaica; 23 August 2014)

Biggest win
- Guadeloupe 8–0 Saint Martin; Baie-Mahault, Guadeloupe; 20 July 2016)

Biggest defeat
- United States 8–0 Guadeloupe (Bradenyon, United States; 9 May 2019)

CONCACAF U-17 Championship
- Appearances: 2 (first in 2019)
- Best result: Round of 16 (2019)

FIFA U-17 World Cup
- Appearances: 0

The Guadeloupe national under 17s football team (French: Sélection de la Guadeloupe de football) represents the French overseas department and region of Guadeloupe in men's international football. The team is controlled by the Ligue Guadeloupéenne de Football (English: Guadeloupean Football League), a local branch of French Football Federation (French: Fédération Française de Football). The team competes in the regional tournament CONCACAF U-17 Championship.

== Players ==
The following squad were called up for the recently ended 2019 CONCACAF U-17 Championship.

No.	Pos.	Player	Date of birth (age)	Club
1	GK	Thomas Delumeau	21 June 2003 (aged 15)	
2	DF	Silvère Perraud	24 March 2003 (aged 16)	
3	DF	Wesley Bastien	1 February 2002 (aged 17)	
4	DF	Jules Désiré	4 August 2003 (aged 15)	
5	MF	Modeste Pelletier	24 July 2003 (aged 15)	
6	MF	Bismarck Bossuet	14 November 2002 (aged 16)	
7	DF	Steven Poirier	30 July 2003 (aged 15)	
8	MF	Alain Godeau	28 July 2003 (aged 15)	
9	FW	Fritz Vaudois	25 April 2003 (aged 16)	
10	MF	Césaire Chatellier	13 January 2002 (aged 17)	
11	FW	André Saint-François	9 October 2003 (aged 15)	
12	FW	Danilson Chartier	14 June 2002 (aged 16)	
13	DF	Guillaume Lefebvre	14 May 2002 (aged 16)	
14	MF	Justin Laurent	28 July 2002 (aged 16)	
15	MF	Florien Vasseur	24 April 2003 (aged 16)	
16	GK	Devon Monplaisir	31 January 2002 (aged 17)	
17	MF	Daniel Valmont	28 November 2002 (aged 16)	
18	MF	Alvyn Certeau	26 March 2002 (aged 17)	
19	MF	Harrison Rigaud	24 February 2002 (aged 17)	
20	MF	Édouard Guillot	15 July 2003 (aged 15)	

== Fixtures and results ==
legend

Win Draw Loss Fixture

== Competitive record ==
=== FIFA U-17 World Cup ===
FIFA U-17 World Cup Record
Hosts / Year	Result	Position	GP	W	D*	L	GS	GA
(China) 1985	Not a FIFA Member							
(Canada) 1987	Not a FIFA Member							
(Scotland) 1989	Not a FIFA Member							
(Italy) 1991	Not a FIFA Member							
(Japan) 1993	Not a FIFA Member							
(Ecuador) 1995	Not a FIFA Member							
(Egypt) 1997	Not a FIFA Member							
(New Zealand) 1999	Not a FIFA Member							
(Trinidad and Tobago) 2001	Not a FIFA Member							
(Finland) 2003	Not a FIFA Member							
(Peru) 2005	Not a FIFA Member							
(South Korea) 2007	Not a FIFA Member							
(Nigeria) 2009	Not a FIFA Member							
(Mexico) 2011	Not a FIFA Member							
(United Arab Emirates) 2013	Not a FIFA Member							
(Chile) 2015	Not a FIFA Member							
(India) 2017	Not a FIFA Member							
(Brazil) 2019	Not a FIFA Member							
(Indonesia) 2023	Not a FIFA Member							
(Qatar) 2025	Not a FIFA Member							
Total	0/20	-	0	0	0	0	0	0

=== CONCACAF U-17 Championship ===
CONCACAF U-17 Championship record
Year	Result	Position	Pld	W	D	L	GF	GA
(Trinidad and Tobago) 1983 to (El Salvador) 1994	Did not enter							
(Trinidad and Tobago) 1996 to (Panama) 2017	Did not qualify							
(United States) 2019	Round of 16		1	0	0	1	0	8
(Guatemala) 2023	Group stage		3	1	0	2	3	7
Total	0 titles	–	4	1	0	3	3	15

*Draws include knockout matches decided on penalty kicks
