= Javier Suárez (footballer) =

Venezuelan footballer (born 2006)

Personal information
- Full name: José Javier Suárez Belisario
- Date of birth: 4 May 2006 (age 20)
- Place of birth: Guárico, Venezuela
- Height: 1.74 m (5 ft 9 in)
- Position: Defender

Team information
- Current team: Cruz Azul Hidalgo
- Number: 66

Youth career
- Pachuca
- Cruz Azul

Senior career*
Years	Team	Apps	(Gls)
2023–	Cruz Azul	1	(0)
2025–2026	→ Atlético San Luis (loan)	7	(0)
2026–	Cruz Azul Hidalgo	12	(1)

International career^{‡}
2022–2023	Mexico U17	17	(3)
2024–	Venezuela U20	6	(0)
Medal record
Men's football
Representing Mexico
CONCACAF Under-17 Championship
Winner	2023 Guatemala
- * Club domestic league appearances and goals as of 31 October 2026 ‡ National team caps and goals as of 1 February 2025

José Javier Suárez Belisario (born 4 May 2006) is a Venezuelan professional footballer who plays as a defender for Liga de Expansión MX club Cruz Azul Hidalgo. He has represented both the Mexico and Venezuela at underage level.

== Early life ==
Suárez was born on 4 May 2006 in Guárico, Venezuela. The son of José Gregorio Suárez and Pilar Belisario, he moved with his family to Mexico in 2010 and obtained Mexican citizenship in 2016. Growing up, he played baseball and started playing football at the age of seven.

== Club career ==
As a youth player, Suárez joined the youth academy of Mexican side Pachuca. Subsequently, he joined the youth academy of Mexican side Cruz Azul. On 12 February 2025, he debuted for them during a 5–0 home win over Real Hope in the CONCACAF Champions Cup.

Ahead of the 2025–26 season, Suárez was sent on a one-year loan to fellow Liga MX club Atlético San Luis. On 18 July 2025, he made his Liga MX debut, coming on as a substitute in the 68th minute of a 1–0 loss to Monterrey.

For the 2026–27 season, Suárez joined Cruz Azul's affiliate team, Cruz Azul Hidalgo, in the Liga de Expansión MX. He made his first appearance for the side in a match against Tapatío. Following his performances for the affiliate squad, Suárez made his first league appearance debut for the Cruz Azul senior team on 16 August 2026 during a 2–1 away defeat against Tijuana.

== Style of play ==
Suárez plays as a defender and is right-footed. Mexican newspaper Récord wrote in 2024 that he "has shown confidence and solidity in one-on-one situations, as well as a notable ability to join the attack with quick and effective exits".

== Career statistics ==
As of match played on 31 October 2026

Appearances and goals by club, season and competition
Club	Season	League			National cup		Continental (Note: Includes CONCACAF Champions Cup)		Other		Total	
Club	Season	Division	Apps	Goals	Apps	Goals	Apps	Goals	Apps	Goals	Apps	Goals
Cruz Azul	2024–25	Liga MX	—		—		1	0	—		1	0
Cruz Azul	2026–27	Liga MX	1	0	—		—		—		1	0
Cruz Azul	Total		1	0	—		1	0	—		2	0
Atlético San Luis (loan)	2025–26	Liga MX	7	0	—		—		1 (Note: Includes Leagues Cup)	0	8	0
Cruz Azul Hidalgo	2026–27	Liga de Expansión MX	12	1	—		—		—		12	1
Career total			20	1	0	0	1	0	1	0	22	1

== Honours ==
Cruz Azul

- CONCACAF Champions Cup: 2025
