= Taha Habroune =

American soccer player (born 2006)

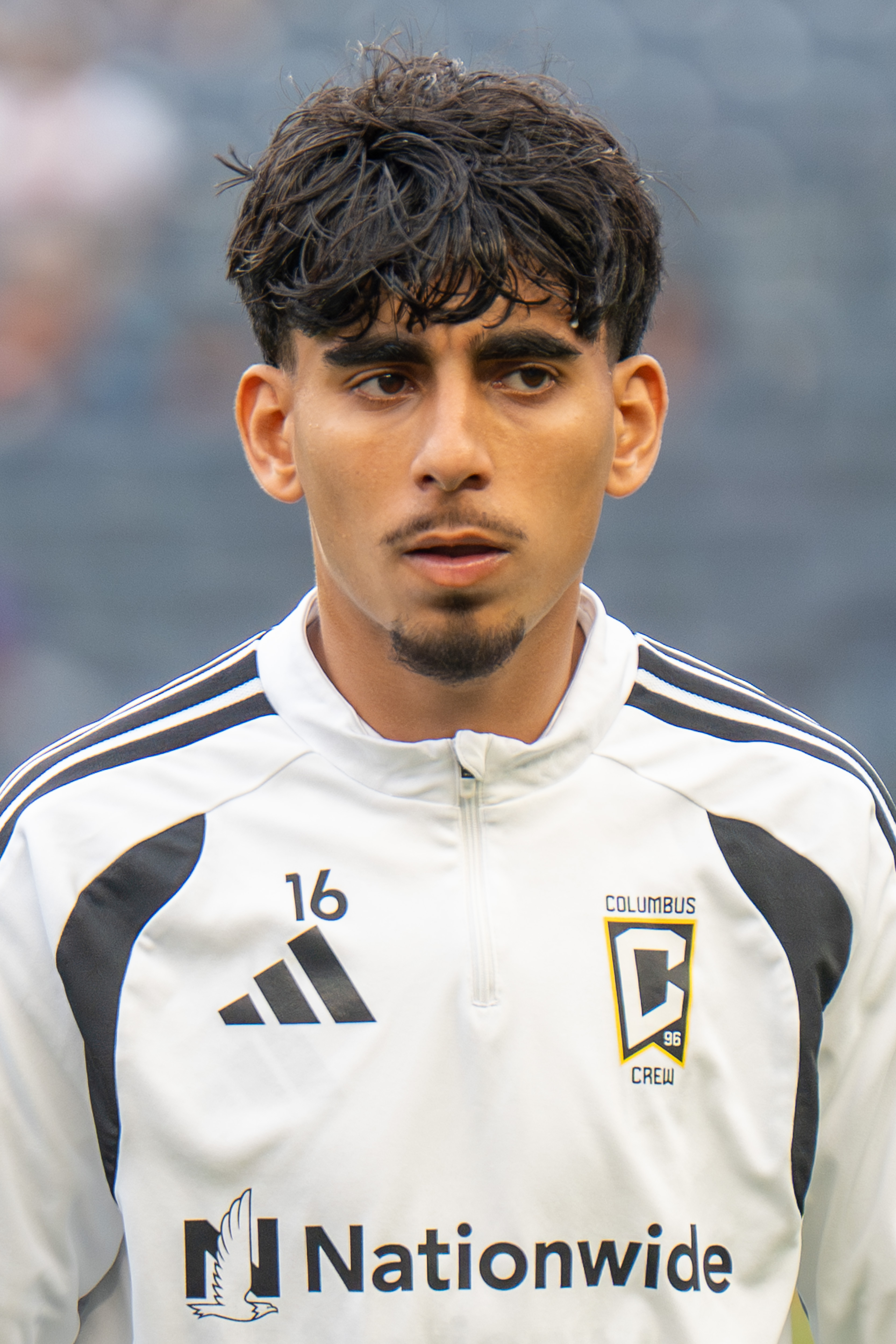
- Habroune with the Columbus Crew in 2026

Personal information
- Full name: Taha Habroune
- Date of birth: February 5, 2006 (age 20)
- Place of birth: Columbus, Ohio, United States
- Height: 6 ft 0 in (1.82 m)
- Position: Midfielder

Team information
- Current team: Columbus Crew
- Number: 16

Youth career
- Blast FC
- 2019–2023: Columbus Crew

Senior career*
| Years | Team | Apps | (Gls) |
| 2023–2025 | Columbus Crew 2 | 24 | (6) |
| 2023– | Columbus Crew | 56 | (6) |

International career^{‡}
| 2023 | United States U17 | 13 | (5) |
| 2024– | United States U19 | 5 | (0) |
| 2024– | United States U20 | 18 | (3) |
Medal record
Men's football
Representing United States
CONCACAF U-20 Championship
| Runner-up | 2024 Mexico |
- * Club domestic league appearances and goals as of 8 November 2026 ‡ National team caps and goals as of 17:53, 21 October 2025 (UTC)

Taha Habroune (Arabic: طه حبرون; born February 5, 2006) is an American professional soccer player who plays as a midfielder for Major League Soccer club Columbus Crew.

== Early life and club career ==
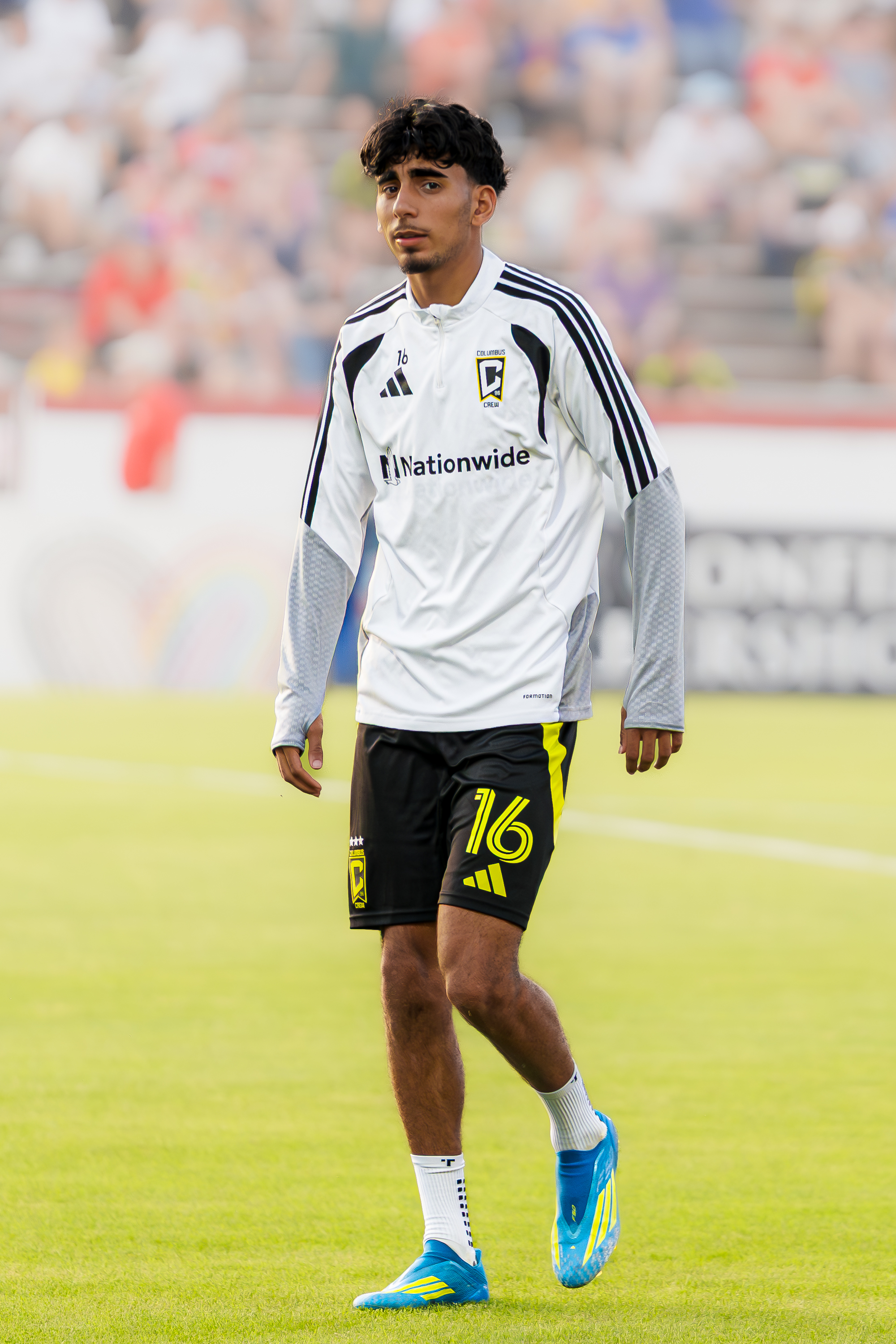
Habroune with the Columbus Crew in 2026

Born in Columbus, Ohio to Moroccan parents, Habroune played with youth club Blast FC before joining the youth academy of the Columbus Crew in 2019, a club he grew up supporting. On May 21, 2023, he signed his first professional contract with Columbus Crew 2. On May 23, 2023, he made his senior debut with the Columbus Crew as a late substitute in a 1–0 U.S. Open Cup loss to Pittsburgh Riverhounds SC. On January 17, 2024, he signed his first professional contract with the senior Columbus Crew side as a homegrown player until 2027 with an additional year option. Habroune played sparingly in his first season in 2024, making his league debut for the Columbus Crew as a starter in a 0–0 tie with Real Salt Lake on April 13. He would not start another game for the Black and Gold that year, finishing the season with five total appearances in 2024.

He made his CONCACAF Champions Cup debut on March 4, 2025, coming on as a halftime substitute. He scored his first goal for the Crew on July 12, 2025 in a 4–2 win over rivals FC Cincinnati. On August 1, he assisted two goals in a 3–1 win against Club Puebla in a Leagues Cup match.

== International career ==
Born in the United States, Habroune is of Moroccan descent and holds dual-citizenship. He was part of the United States under-17 team that came in second for the 2023 CONCACAF U-17 Championship, and also made the squad for the 2023 FIFA U-17 World Cup. In 2024, he progressed to the United States under-19 team, taking part in training camps that March and June. The same year, Habroune advanced again to the under-20 team, contributing to the squad that finished second at the CONCACAF U-20 Championship, and went on to compete at the 2025 FIFA U-20 World Cup.

== Honors ==
Columbus Crew

- Leagues Cup: 2024
