= Geovanni Pérez =

Mexican footballer (born 2005)

Personal information
- Full name: Jonathan Geovanni Pérez Sánchez
- Date of birth: 27 October 2005 (age 21)
- Place of birth: Villa de Álvarez, Colima, Mexico
- Height: 1.82 m (6 ft 0 in)
- Position: Centre-back

Team information
- Current team: Santos Laguna
- Number: 28

Youth career
- 2019–2020: UdeC
- 2021–2025: Santos Laguna

Senior career*
Years	Team	Apps	(Gls)
2024–	Santos Laguna	30	(2)

International career^{‡}
2022	Mexico U18	3	(0)
2025	Mexico U20	1	(0)
- * Club domestic league appearances and goals as of 6 November 2026 ‡ National team caps and goals as of 18 June 2026

Jonathan Geovanni Pérez Sánchez (born 27 October 2005) is a Mexican professional footballer who plays as a centre-back for Liga MX club Santos Laguna.

== Club career ==
Pérez began his career at the academy of UdeC before moving to Santos Laguna's academy, where he made his professional debut on 18 August 2024 in a 1–3 loss to Tijuana where he was subbed in at the 69th minute. On 9 November 2024, he scored his first goal in a 2–3 loss to Querétaro.

== Career statistics ==
As of match played on 6 November 2026

Club	Season	League			Cup		Continental		Other		Total	
Club	Season	Division	Apps	Goals	Apps	Goals	Apps	Goals	Apps	Goals	Apps	Goals
Santos Laguna	2024–25	Liga MX	14	1	—		—		—		14	1
Santos Laguna	2025–26	Liga MX	7	1	—		—		—		7	1
Santos Laguna	2026–27	Liga MX	9	0	—		—		1 (Note: Appearances in Leagues Cup)	0	10	0
Career total			30	2	0	0	0	0	1	0	31	2
