= Erik Pop =

Canadian soccer player (born 2006)

Personal information
- Full name: Erik David Pop
- Date of birth: January 30, 2006 (age 20)
- Place of birth: Mississauga, Ontario, Canada
- Height: 1.88 m (6 ft 2 in)
- Position: Forward

Youth career
- 2013–2022: ProStars FC
- 2023–2024: Karlsruher SC

College career
Years	Team	Apps	(Gls)
2026–	Marshall Thundering Herd	0	(0)

Senior career*
Years	Team	Apps	(Gls)
2024	Karlsruher SC II	3	(0)
2025	Valour FC	17	(1)

International career
2023	Canada U17	8	(1)
2024	Romania U18	2	(0)
- * Club domestic league appearances and goals as of October 27, 2025

Erik David Pop (born January 30, 2006) is a professional soccer player who plays as a forward.

== Early life ==
Pop began playing youth soccer with ProStars FC, which was founded by his father Gabriel. In January 2023, he went to Germany to trial with FC Köln, before signing two weeks later with Karlsruher SC.

== College career ==
In 2026, Pop began attending Marshall University, where he joined the men's soccer team.

== Club career ==
In 2024, Pop played with Karlsruher SC II in the sixth tier Verbandsliga Nordbaden.

In January 2025, he signed with Valour FC in the Canadian Premier League on a two-year contract, with an option for 2027. On October 5, 2025, he scored his first goal in a 3–3 draw against Atlético Ottawa.

== International career ==
Pop is eligible to represent Canada and Romania at international level.

He made his debut in the Canadian national program in October 2022, attending a camp with the Canada U17. He was subsequently named to the roster for the 2023 CONCACAF U-17 Championship and 2023 FIFA U-17 World Cup.

In 2024, he represented Romania U18.

== Career statistics ==
As of October 27, 2025

Club	Season	League			Playoffs		Domestic Cup		Other		Total	
Club	Season	Division	Apps	Goals	Apps	Goals	Apps	Goals	Apps	Goals	Apps	Goals
Karlsruher SC II	2024–25	Verbandsliga Nordbaden	3	0	–		–		–		3	0
Valour FC	2025	Canadian Premier League	17	1	–		1	0	–		18	1
Career total			20	1	0	0	1	0	0	0	21	1
