= Keyrol Figueroa =

Honduran footballer (born 2006)

Personal information
- Full name: Keyrol Alexis Figueroa Norales
- Date of birth: 31 August 2006 (age 20)
- Place of birth: Tegucigalpa, Honduras
- Height: 1.80 m (5 ft 11 in)
- Position: Forward

Team information
- Current team: Port Vale (on loan from Liverpool)
- Number: 24

Youth career
- 2016–2018: FC Dallas
- 2018–2026: Liverpool

Senior career*
Years	Team	Apps	(Gls)
2026–	Liverpool	0	(0)
2026–	→ Port Vale (loan)	6	(2)

International career^{‡}
2022–2024	United States U17	13	(9)
2022–2023	United States U18	4	(2)
2024	United States U19	4	(1)
2024–2025	United States U20	7	(1)
2026–	Honduras	7	(1)
Medal record
Men's football
Representing United States
CONCACAF U-17 Championship
Runner-up	2023 Guatemala
CONCACAF U-20 Championship
Runner-up	2024 Mexico
- * Club domestic league appearances and goals as of 10:24, 22 November 2026 (UTC) ‡ National team caps and goals as of 14:51, 20 November 2026 (UTC)

Keyrol Alexis Figueroa Norales (born 31 August 2006) is a Honduran professional footballer who plays as a striker for EFL League Two club Port Vale, on loan from Premier League club Liverpool, and the Honduras national team. He is the son of former Honduras international Maynor Figueroa.

Norales represented the United States at youth level, featuring in matchday squads in the finals of the CONCACAF U-17 and U-20 Championships, before switching allegiance to Honduras in 2026. He turned professional at Liverpool in May 2024 and was loaned to Port Vale for the 2026–27 season.

== Early and personal life ==
Keyrol Alexis Figueroa Norales was born in Tegucigalpa, the capital of Honduras, on 31 August 2006. He is the son of former Honduran international Maynor Figueroa, and paternal half-brother of Dereck Moncada. His father was the most capped player in Honduras history. His mother represented Honduras in handball. His younger brother, Keyvan, was with the Burnley Academy and represented the US at youth level.

He moved to England at an early age. He also spent part of his childhood in the United States, where he eventually obtained American citizenship, before returning to England. US Soccer listed his hometown as Warrington, England.

== Club career ==
As a youth player, Figueroa joined the youth academy of Liverpool in the English Premier League. He made his debut for the U18 side in October 2021, at two months past his 15th birthday. He had been called up to the U18s by coach Marc Bridge-Wilkinson after scoring 90 goals in one season. He scored hat-tricks against Wolverhampton Wanderers U18 and Everton U21. He signed his first professional contract with the club in May 2024, despite having struggled with various minor injuries during the 2023–24 season. He was judged to have improved under the tutelage of new U21 head coach Rob Page. He was named by Arne Slot on the first-team bench for the first time on 29 October 2025, in an EFL Cup tie with Crystal Palace at Anfield in the EFL Cup. He was nominated for the PL2 Player of the Month award in January 2026.

On 1 September 2026, Figueroa was loaned to EFL League Two club Port Vale until the end of the 2026–27 season. He scored his first goal in domestic football on 20 October, when his strike secured Jon Brady's Valiants a point in a 1–1 draw at Gillingham.

== International career ==
Born in Honduras, he was eligible to represent the United States, Honduras, or England. Figueroa represented the United States at youth level. He was a squad member for the 2023 CONCACAF U-17 Championship, playing in the 3–1 defeat to Mexico at the final in Guatemala City. He was also named in the tournament's Best XI. He was an unused substitute in the 2024 CONCACAF U-20 Championship final, a 2–1 defeat to Mexico.

In May 2026, Figueroa committed his international future to Honduras, and his request to switch allegiance to Honduras was approved by FIFA. He made his senior international debut for Honduras on 6 June 2026, coming on as a substitute in a 2–0 friendly defeat against Argentina at Kyle Field in College Station, Texas.

He scored his first goal for his country on 28 September 2026, in a 1–0 CONCACAF Nations League win over Jamaica at Independence Park.

== Style of play ==
Port Vale manager Jon Brady described Figueroa as "quick, direct and dynamic", adding that "there is an unpredictability to him".

== Career statistics ==
=== Club statistics ===
As of match played 21 November 2026

Appearances and goals by club, season and competition
Club	Season	League			FA Cup		EFL Cup		Other		Total	
Club	Season	Division	Apps	Goals	Apps	Goals	Apps	Goals	Apps	Goals	Apps	Goals
Liverpool
Liverpool	2024–25	Premier League	0	0	0	0	0	0	0	0	0	0
Liverpool	2025–26	Premier League	0	0	0	0	0	0	0	0	0	0
Liverpool	2026–27	Premier League	0	0	0	0	0	0	0	0	0	0
Liverpool	Total		0	0	0	0	0	0	0	0	0	0
Liverpool U21
Liverpool U21	2024–25	—			—		—		3 (Note: Appearance(s) in the EFL Trophy)	0	3	0
Liverpool U21	2025–26	—			—		—		1	0	1	0
Liverpool U21	Total		—		—		—		4	0	4	0
Port Vale (loan)	2026–27	EFL League Two	6	2	1	1	—		1	1	8	4
Career total			6	2	1	1	0	4	1	1	12	4

=== International statistics ===
As of match played 16 November 2026

Appearances and goals by national team and year
Honduras national team
Year	Apps	Goals
2026	7	1
Total	7	1

List of international goals scored by Keyrol Figueroa
No.	Date	Venue	Cap	Opponent	Score	Result	Competition	Ref.
1	28 September 2026	Independence Park, Kingston, Jamaica	14	Jamaica	1–0	1–0	2026–27 CONCACAF Nations League A	

Honduras score listed first, score column indicates score after each Figueroa goal

== Honours ==
Individual

- CONCACAF U-17 Championship Best XI: 2023

United States

- CONCACAF U-17 Championship runner-up: 2023
- CONCACAF U-20 Championship runner-up: 2024
