= 2023 CONCACAF U-17 Championship =

Association football tournament for under-17 national teams

Premundial CONCACAF Sub-17 2023 (in Spanish)

Tournament details
- Host country: Guatemala
- Dates: 11–26 February
- Teams: 20 (from 1 confederation)
- Venues: 2 (in 2 host cities)

Final positions
- Champions: Mexico (9th title)
- Runners-up: United States

Tournament statistics
- Matches played: 39
- Goals scored: 158 (4.05 per match)
- Top scorer(s): (Mexico) Stephano Carrillo (8 goals)
- Best player: (Mexico) Gael Álvarez
- Best goalkeeper: (Mexico) Norberto Bedolla
- Fair play award: Mexico

The 2023 CONCACAF U-17 Championship was the 7th edition of the CONCACAF Under-17 Championship (20th edition if all eras included), the men's under-17 international football tournament organized by CONCACAF. It was hosted by Guatemala between 11 February and 26 February 2023. The top four teams qualified for the 2023 FIFA U-17 World Cup in Indonesia as CONCACAF representatives.

Mexico were the defending champions, and won a fifth consecutive title.

== Qualified teams ==
The 41 CONCACAF teams were ranked based on the CONCACAF Men's Under-17 Ranking as of December 2019. A total of 38 teams entered the tournament. The sixteen highest-ranked entrants were exempt from qualifying and advanced directly to the group stage of the final tournament, while the lowest-ranked twenty-two entrants had to participate in qualifying, where the four group winners advanced to the round of 16 of the knockout stage of the final tournament.

Round	Team	Qualification	Appearance	Previous best performance	Previous FIFA U-17 World Cup appearances
Group stage	Mexico (title holders)	1st ranked entrant	18th	Champions (1985, 1987, 1991, 1996, 2013, 2015, 2017, 2019) (Note: Also final group winner in 1999 and 2005.)	14
Group stage	United States	2nd ranked entrant	19th	Champions (1983, 1992, 2011) (Note: Also final group winner in 2001, 2003, 2005 and 2007.)	17
Group stage	Costa Rica	3rd ranked entrant	18th	Champions (1994) (Note: Also final group winner in 2001 and 2003.)	10
Group stage	Honduras	4th ranked entrant	19th	Runners-up (2015)	5
Group stage	Canada	5th ranked entrant	18th	Runners-up (2011)	7
Group stage	Panama	6th ranked entrant	10th	Runners-up (2013)	2
Group stage	Haiti	7th ranked entrant	9th	Final group winner (2007)	2
Group stage	Jamaica	8th ranked entrant	15th	Final group winner (1999)	2
Group stage	Cuba	9th ranked entrant	11th	Champions (1988)	2
Group stage	El Salvador	10th ranked entrant	16th	Fourth place (1999)	0
Group stage	Trinidad and Tobago	11th ranked entrant	15th	Runners-up (1983)	2
Group stage	Guatemala (host)	12th ranked entrant	12th	Quarter-finals (2013)	0
Group stage	Curaçao (Note: Includes five appearances as the Netherlands Antilles before 2010.)	13th ranked entrant	8th	Round of 16 (2019)	0
Group stage	Suriname	14th ranked entrant	3rd	First round (2017, 2019)	0
Group stage	Barbados	15th ranked entrant	4th	First round (2011, 2013, 2019)	0
Group stage	Guadeloupe	16th ranked entrant	2nd	Round of 16 (2019)	0
Round of 16	Bermuda	Qualifying Group A winner	3rd	First round (1996, 2019)	0
Round of 16	Puerto Rico	Qualifying Group B winner	4th	Round of 16 (2019)	0
Round of 16	Dominican Republic	Qualifying Group C winner	4th	Round of 16 (2019)	0
Round of 16	Nicaragua	Qualifying Group D winner	3rd	Round of 16 (2019)	0

== Venues ==
2023 CONCACAF U-17 Championship is located in Guatemala	Antigua Guatemala	Guatemala City
2023 CONCACAF U-17 Championship is located in Guatemala	Estadio Pensativo	Estadio Doroteo Guamuch Flores
2023 CONCACAF U-17 Championship is located in Guatemala	Capacity: 10,000	Capacity: 26,000

== Match officials ==
On 31 January 2023, CONCACAF announced the list of 18 referees and 16 assistant referees appointed for the tournament.

Referees

- (Antigua and Barbuda) Ken Pennyfeather
- (Curaçao) Norberto Da Silva
- (Dominican Republic) Adonis Carrasco
- (El Salvador) Filiberto Martínez
- (Guatemala) José Fuentes
- (Guyana) Shavin Greene
- (Honduras) Jefferson Escobar
- (Jamaica) Christopher Mason
- (Jamaica) Okeito Nicholson
- (Mexico) Víctor Cáceres
- (Mexico) Daniel Quintero
- (Panama) Fernando Morón
- (Saint Kitts and Nevis) Sanchez Bass
- (Saint Kitts and Nevis) Reginald Gumbs
- (Suriname) Sergio Rozenhaut
- (Trinidad and Tobago) Kwinsi Williams
- (United States) Joe Dickerson
- (United States) Victor Rivas

Assistant referees

- (Costa Rica) William Chow
- (Cuba) Leonel Garcia
- (Dominican Republic) Lendy Taveras
- (El Salvador) Carlos Vargas
- (Guatemala) Cristian Alvarado
- (Guatemala) Aczel Perez
- (Honduras) Luis Paz
- (Jamaica) Kemar Gayle
- (Jamaica) Joshua Jackson
- (Jamaica) McKenzie Ricardo
- (Nicaragua) Berman Bermudez
- (Mexico) Marco Bisguerra
- (Mexico) Leonardo Castillo
- (Mexico) Michel Espinoza
- (Saint Kitts and Nevis) Jaden Rouse
- (United States) Jose Da Silva

== Draw ==
The draw for the group stage took place on 29 September 2022, at the CONCACAF Headquarters in Miami. The sixteen teams were drawn into four groups of four teams. Based on the CONCACAF Men's Under-17 Ranking, the top four ranked teams were seeded into position one of each group, while the remaining twelve teams were distributed in the other pots, as follows:

Pot 1	Pot 2	Pot 3	Pot 4
Mexico (E1); United States (F1); Costa Rica (G1); Honduras (H1)	Canada; Panama; Haiti; Jamaica	Cuba; El Salvador; Trinidad and Tobago; Guatemala	Curaçao; Suriname; Barbados; Guadeloupe

== Squads ==
Players born on or after 1 January 2006 were eligible to compete.

== Group stage ==
The top three teams in each group advanced to the round of 16, where they were joined by the four teams advancing from the qualifying round. The teams were ranked according to points (3 points for a win, 1 point for a draw, 0 points for a loss). If tied on points, tiebreakers were applied in the following order:

1. Greater goal difference in all group matches;
2. Greater number of goals scored in all group matches;
3. Greater number of points in matches between the tied teams;
4. Greater goal difference in matches between the tied teams (if more than two teams finished equal on points);
5. Greater number of goals scored in matches among the tied teams (if more than two teams finished equal in points);
6. The lower number of points based on the number of yellow and red cards in all group matches was considered according to the following additions:
  - Yellow card: −1 point;
  - Indirect red card (second yellow card): −3 points;
  - Direct red card: −4 points;
  - Yellow card and direct red card: −5 points;
7. Drawing of lots.

All times are in GTT (UTC−6).

=== Group E ===
Pos	Team	Pld	W	D	L	GF	GA	GD	Pts	Qualification
1	Mexico	3	2	1	0	12	1	+11	7	Round of 16
2	Panama	3	2	1	0	6	1	+5	7	Round of 16
3	Guatemala (H)	3	1	0	2	8	6	+2	3	Round of 16
4	Curaçao	3	0	0	3	3	21	−18	0	

Source: CONCACAF
Rules for classification: Tie-breakers
(H) Hosts
11 February 2023
16:00

Mexico	9–0	Curaçao
Álvarez 2'; Martínez 14' (pen.); Barajas 17'; Carrillo 23', 45'; Valencia 72'; Moxica 86'; Urías 89' (pen.); Arroyo 90+2'	Report

Estadio Doroteo Guamuch Flores, Guatemala City
Referee: Filiberto Martínez (El Salvador)
11 February 2023
19:00

Panama	1–0	Guatemala
Walder 16'	Report

Estadio Doroteo Guamuch Flores, Guatemala City
Referee: Victor Rivas (United States)

13 February 2023
16:00

Curaçao	0–4	Panama
	Report	Walder 8', 33'; Hall 39'; Díaz 51'

Estadio Doroteo Guamuch Flores, Guatemala City
Referee: Reginald Gumbs (Saint Kitts and Nevis)
13 February 2023
19:00

Guatemala	0–2	Mexico
	Report	Carrillo 25'; Barajas 90+1'

Estadio Doroteo Guamuch Flores, Guatemala City
Referee: Joe Dickerson (United States)

15 February 2023
16:00

Mexico	1–1	Panama
Azcarate 34'	Report	Ryce 54'

Estadio Doroteo Guamuch Flores, Guatemala City
Referee: Jefferson Escobar (Honduras)
15 February 2023
19:00

Guatemala	8–3	Curaçao
Escobar 3' (pen.), 25', 51'; Garzaro 14' (pen.), 34'; Sagastume 40' (pen.); Chinchilla 90+1'; Guerra 90+4' (pen.)	Report	Sambo 29'; Lon 45+1' (o.g.); Inesia 56'

Estadio Doroteo Guamuch Flores, Guatemala City
Referee: Kwinsi Williams (Trinidad and Tobago)

=== Group F ===
Pos	Team	Pld	W	D	L	GF	GA	GD	Pts	Qualification
1	United States	3	3	0	0	9	1	+8	9	Round of 16
2	Canada	3	2	0	1	5	3	+2	6	Round of 16
3	Trinidad and Tobago	3	0	1	2	4	7	−3	1	Round of 16
4	Barbados	3	0	1	2	1	8	−7	1	

Source: CONCACAF
Rules for classification: Tie-breakers
11 February 2023
16:00

Canada	3–2	Trinidad and Tobago
Vojvodic 27', 68'; Omeze 61'	Report	Webb 67'; Sween 81'

Estadio Pensativo, Antigua Guatemala
Referee: José Fuentes (Guatemala)
11 February 2023
19:00

United States	5–0	Barbados
Medina 25', 43', 90+3'; Figueroa 86'; Habroune 89'	Report

Estadio Pensativo, Antigua Guatemala
Referee: Okeito Nicholson (Jamaica)

13 February 2023
16:00

Barbados	0–2	Canada
	Report	MacKenzie 21'; Biello 28' (pen.)

Estadio Pensativo, Antigua Guatemala
Referee: Sanchez Bass (Saint Kitts and Nevis)
13 February 2023
19:00

Trinidad and Tobago	1–3	United States
Garcia 78'	Report	Burton 11'; Rudisill 14'; Habroune 24'

Estadio Pensativo, Antigua Guatemala
Referee: Víctor Cáceres (Mexico)

15 February 2023
16:00

Trinidad and Tobago	1–1	Barbados
Sween 82'	Report	Harewood 38'

Estadio Pensativo, Antigua Guatemala
Referee: Adonis Carrasco (Dominican Republic)
15 February 2023
19:00

United States	1–0	Canada
Figueroa 64'	Report

Estadio Pensativo, Antigua Guatemala
Referee: Fernando Morón (Panama)

=== Group G ===
Pos	Team	Pld	W	D	L	GF	GA	GD	Pts	Qualification
1	Costa Rica	3	2	1	0	8	3	+5	7	Round of 16
2	Jamaica	3	1	1	1	7	6	+1	4	Round of 16
3	Cuba	3	1	0	2	6	8	−2	3	Round of 16
4	Guadeloupe	3	1	0	2	3	7	−4	3	

Source: CONCACAF
Rules for classification: Tie-breakers
12 February 2023
16:00

Jamaica	4–2	Cuba
Bell 22'; Watson 56', 75'; Gordon 70'	Report	D. Reinoso 78', 89'

Estadio Doroteo Guamuch Flores, Guatemala City
Referee: Kwinsi Williams (Trinidad and Tobago)
12 February 2023
19:00

Costa Rica	2–1	Guadeloupe
Albriton 5'; Narajo 14'	Report	Bienville 53'

Estadio Doroteo Guamuch Flores, Guatemala City
Referee: Ken Pennyfeather (Antigua and Barbuda)

14 February 2023
16:00

Guadeloupe	2–1	Jamaica
Jacques 78'; Moloza 90'	Report	Barrett 41'

Estadio Doroteo Guamuch Flores, Guatemala City
Referee: Sergio Rozenhaut (Suriname)
14 February 2023
19:00

Cuba	0–4	Costa Rica
	Report	Bustos 4'; Sandi 11'; Maroto 20'; Wilson 79'

Estadio Doroteo Guamuch Flores, Guatemala City
Referee: Shavin Greene (Guyana)

16 February 2023
16:00

Cuba	4–0	Guadeloupe
Y. Reinoso 22'; Hernández 32'; D. Reinoso 68'; Sosa 75'	Report

Estadio Doroteo Guamuch Flores, Guatemala City
Referee: Reginald Gumbs (Saint Kitts and Nevis)
16 February 2023
19:00

Costa Rica	2–2	Jamaica
Bustos 79'; Albriton 87'	Report	Gooden 17'; Reid 62'

Estadio Doroteo Guamuch Flores, Guatemala City
Referee: Victor Rivas (United States)

=== Group H ===
Pos	Team	Pld	W	D	L	GF	GA	GD	Pts	Qualification
1	Honduras	3	3	0	0	11	2	+9	9	Round of 16
2	El Salvador	3	2	0	1	8	5	+3	6	Round of 16
3	Haiti	3	1	0	2	4	4	0	3	Round of 16
4	Suriname	3	0	0	3	1	13	−12	0	

Source: CONCACAF
Rules for classification: Tie-breakers
12 February 2023
16:00

Haiti	1–3	El Salvador
Tomlison 11'	Report	Argueta 39', 63'; Figueroa 86'

Estadio Pensativo, Antigua Guatemala
Referee: Norberto Da Silva (Curaçao)
12 February 2023
19:00

Honduras	6–1	Suriname
N. Cruz 5'; Vargas 40'; Saenz 51'; Munguía 75', 88'; Osorto 85' (pen.)	Report	Goodett 43'

Estadio Pensativo, Antigua Guatemala
Referee: Adonis Carrasco (Dominican Republic)

14 February 2023
16:00

Suriname	0–3	Haiti
	Report	Joseph 53'; Lebrun 57'; Lamare 83'

Estadio Pensativo, Antigua Guatemala
Referee: Christopher Mason (Jamaica)
14 February 2023
19:00

El Salvador	1–4	Honduras
Bueso 36' (o.g.)	Report	Munguía 15'; Garcia 27'; Herrera 45+1'; Vargas 64'

Estadio Pensativo, Antigua Guatemala
Referee: Daniel Quintero (Mexico)

16 February 2023
16:00

El Salvador	4–0	Suriname
B. Vasquez 24'; Argueta 28'; Arias 60'; Diaz 82'	Report

Estadio Pensativo, Antigua Guatemala
Referee: Okeito Nicholson (Jamaica)
16 February 2023
19:00

Honduras	1–0	Haiti
R. Cruz 45+2'	Report

Estadio Pensativo, Antigua Guatemala
Referee: José Fuentes (Guatemala)

== Knockout stage ==
=== Bracket ===
Round of 16
18 February
Mexico	6
Nicaragua	0
19 February
El Salvador (a.e.t.)	3
Trinidad and Tobago	2
19 February
Panama	2
Cuba	0
19 February
Honduras	6
Bermuda	0
19 February
Costa Rica	1 (2)
Puerto Rico (p)	1 (4)
18 February
Canada	3
Haiti	0
18 February
Jamaica	1
Guatemala	2
18 February
United States	7
Dominican Republic	0

Quarter-finals
21 February
Mexico	3
El Salvador	0
22 February
Panama	2
Honduras	1
22 February
Puerto Rico	0
Canada	3
21 February
Guatemala	3
United States	5

Semi-finals
24 February
Mexico	5
Panama	0
24 February
Canada	0
United States	2

Final
26 February
Mexico	3
United States	1

=== Round of 16 ===
18 February 2023
16:00

Mexico	6–0	Nicaragua
Barajas 19'; García 23'; Álvarez 30'; Carrillo 60', 68'; Urias 90+1'	Report

Estadio Doroteo Guamuch Flores, Guatemala City
Referee: Ken Pennyfeather (Antigua and Barbuda)

18 February 2023
19:00

Jamaica	1–2	Guatemala
Barrett 54'	Report	Sagastume 32'; Vásquez 77'

Estadio Doroteo Guamuch Flores, Guatemala City
Referee: Filiberto Martínez (El Salvador)

18 February 2023
16:00

United States	7–0	Dominican Republic
Aquino 22', 30' (pen.); Figueroa 45+2', 57'; Burton 62'; Soto 83', 90'	Report

Estadio Pensativo, Antigua Guatemala
Referee: Daniel Quintero (Mexico)

18 February 2023
19:00

Canada	3–0	Haiti
N’Diaye 4'; Ozimec 16'; Pop 88'	Report

Estadio Pensativo, Antigua Guatemala
Referee: Víctor Cáceres (Mexico)

19 February 2023
16:00

Costa Rica	1–1 (a.e.t.)	Puerto Rico
Wilson 90'	Report	Byron 67'
Penalties
Maroto (penalty missed); Ramirez (penalty missed); Castro (penalty scored); Naranjo (penalty scored)	2–4	(penalty scored) Rosa; (penalty scored) Prado; (penalty scored) Rosario; (penalty missed) Torres; (penalty scored) Delgado

Estadio Doroteo Guamuch Flores, Guatemala City
Referee: Jefferson Escobar (Honduras)

19 February 2023
19:00

Panama	2–0	Cuba
Rios 57'; Walder 78'	Report

Estadio Doroteo Guamuch Flores, Guatemala City
Referee: Joe Dickerson (United States)

19 February 2023
16:00

Honduras	6–0	Bermuda
R. Cruz 21'; Munguía 24'; Osorto 27'; N. Cruz 37'; Garcia 54'; Vargas 67'	Report

Estadio Pensativo, Antigua Guatemala
Referee: Christopher Mason (Jamaica)

19 February 2023
19:00

El Salvador	3–2 (a.e.t.)	Trinidad and Tobago
B. Vasquez 3'; Menjívar 64'; Ventura 106'	Report	Cardines 33'; Webb 79'

Estadio Pensativo, Antigua Guatemala
Referee: Adonis Carrasco (Dominican Republic)

=== Quarter-finals ===
Winners qualified for 2023 FIFA U-17 World Cup.

21 February 2023
16:00

Mexico	3–0	El Salvador
Carrillo 18'; Urías 63', 71'	Report

Estadio Doroteo Guamuch Flores, Guatemala City
Referee: Joe Dickerson (United States)

21 February 2023
19:00

Guatemala	3–5	United States
Escobar 45' (pen.); Vásquez 52'; Aguilar 74'	Report	Romero 7'; Figueroa 28', 53'; Harangi 50'; Habroune 83'

Estadio Doroteo Guamuch Flores, Guatemala City
Referee: Víctor Cáceres (Mexico)

22 February 2023
16:00

Puerto Rico	0–3	Canada
	Report	Vojvodic 8'; N’Diaye 36'; Stefanovic 55'

Estadio Doroteo Guamuch Flores, Guatemala City
Referee: Kwinsi Williams (Trinidad and Tobago)

22 February 2023
19:00

Panama	2–1	Honduras
Vaquedano 50' (o.g.); Pierre 90+1'	Report	R. Cruz 90+3'

Estadio Doroteo Guamuch Flores, Guatemala City
Referee: José Fuentes (Guatemala)

=== Semi-finals ===
24 February 2023
16:00

Mexico	5–0	Panama
Carrillo 37'; Krug 57' (o.g.); Urías 67'; Lomelí 78'; Suárez 90+1'	Report

Estadio Doroteo Guamuch Flores, Guatemala City
Referee: Adonis Carrasco (Dominican Republic)

24 February 2023
19:00

Canada	0–2	United States
	Report	Burton 36'; Figueroa 90+4'

Estadio Doroteo Guamuch Flores, Guatemala City
Referee: Christopher Mason (Jamaica)

=== Final ===
26 February 2023
19:00

Mexico	3–1	United States
Carrillo 10'; Navarrete 51'; Martínez 90+2'	Report	Soma 69'

Estadio Doroteo Guamuch Flores, Guatemala City
Referee: Filiberto Martínez (El Salvador)

== Awards ==
=== Winners ===
2023 CONCACAF U-17 Championship winners

Mexico
Ninth title

The following awards were given at the conclusion of the tournament.

Golden Ball

- (Mexico) Gael Álvarez

Golden Boot

- (Mexico) Stephano Carrillo (8 goals)

Golden Glove

- (Mexico) Norberto Bedolla

Fair Play

- Mexico

Best XI
Goalkeepers	Defenders	Midfielders	Forwards
(Mexico) Norberto Bedolla	(Canada) Lazar Stefanovic; (Mexico) Kevin Garcia; (Mexico) Jose Suarez	(Mexico) Jose Urias; (Honduras) Edwin Munguia; (Mexico) Gael Alvarez; (United States) Cruz Medina	(Panama) Kevin Walder; (Mexico) Stephano Carrillo; (United States) Keyrol Figueroa

== Goalscorers ==
There were 158 goals scored in 39 matches, for an average of 4.05 goals per match.

8 goals

- (Mexico) Stephano Carrillo

7 goals

- (United States) Keyrol Figueroa

5 goals

- (Mexico) José Urías

4 goals

- (Guatemala) Olger Escobar
- (Honduras) Edwin Munguía
- (Panama) Kevin Walder

3 goals

- (Canada) Kyler Vojvodic
- (Cuba) Didier Reinoso
- (El Salvador) Christopher Argueta
- (Honduras) Russel Cruz
- (Honduras) Nayrobi Vargas
- (Mexico) Fidel Barajas
- (United States) Micah Burton
- (United States) Taha Habroune
- (United States) Cruz Medina

2 goals

- (Canada) Antoine N'Diaye
- (Costa Rica) Sean Albriton
- (Costa Rica) Roy Bustos
- (Costa Rica) Akheem Wilson
- (El Salvador) Bryan Vasquez
- (Guatemala) Santiago Garzaro
- (Guatemala) Selvin Sagastume
- (Guatemala) Gabino Vásquez
- (Honduras) Nixon Cruz
- (Honduras) Jordan Garcia
- (Honduras) Roberto Osorto
- (Jamaica) Ronaldo Barrett
- (Jamaica) Orane Watson
- (Mexico) Gael Álvarez
- (Mexico) Isaac Martínez
- (Trinidad and Tobago) Lindell Sween
- (Trinidad and Tobago) Malachai Webb
- (United States) Christopher Aquino
- (United States) Ezekiel Soto

1 goal

- (Barbados) Shamari Harewood
- (Canada) Alessandro Biello
- (Canada) Liam MacKenzie
- (Canada) Chimere Omeze
- (Canada) Lucas Ozimec
- (Canada) Erik Pop
- (Canada) Lazar Stefanovic
- (Costa Rica) Víctor Maroto
- (Costa Rica) Andry Narajo
- (Costa Rica) Andryk Sandi
- (Cuba) Lizardo Hernández
- (Cuba) Yansiel Reinoso
- (Cuba) Hanoy Sosa
- (Curaçao) Luigi Inesia
- (Curaçao) Giandro Sambo
- (El Salvador) Cristopher Arias
- (El Salvador) Nelson Diaz
- (El Salvador) Elder Figueroa
- (El Salvador) Walter Menjívar
- (El Salvador) Michael Ventura
- (Guadeloupe) Yanis Bienville
- (Guadeloupe) Willan Jacques
- (Guadeloupe) Ylan Moloza
- (Guatemala) Carlos Aguilar
- (Guatemala) Nicolás Chinchilla
- (Guatemala) Oseas Guerra
- (Haiti) Sebatien Joseph
- (Haiti) Samuel Lamare
- (Haiti) Schneilorens Lebrun
- (Haiti) Kaief Tomlison
- (Honduras) David Herrera
- (Honduras) Bryan Saenz
- (Jamaica) Jahmani Bell
- (Jamaica) Alexavier Gooden
- (Jamaica) Ashton Gordon
- (Jamaica) Adrian Reid
- (Mexico) José Arroyo
- (Mexico) Yerar Azcarate
- (Mexico) Kevin García
- (Mexico) Brandon Lomelí
- (Mexico) Joaquín Moxica
- (Mexico) Luis Navarrete
- (Mexico) Javier Suárez
- (Mexico) Álex Valencia
- (Panama) Erick Díaz
- (Panama) Juan Hall
- (Panama) Joshua Pierre
- (Panama) Hector Rios
- (Panama) Anel Ryce
- (Puerto Rico) Samuel Byron
- (Suriname) Jemairo Goodett
- (Trinidad and Tobago) Rio Cardines
- (Trinidad and Tobago) Derrel Garcia
- (United States) Aiden Harangi
- (United States) Brian Romero
- (United States) Paulo Rudisill
- (United States) Pedro Soma

1 own goal

- (Guatemala) Ariel Lon (against Curaçao)
- (Honduras) Jonathan Bueso (against El Salvador)
- (Honduras) Brayan Vaquedano (against Panama)
- (Panama) Martín Krug (against Mexico)

== Qualified teams for FIFA U-17 World Cup ==
The following four teams from CONCACAF qualified for the 2023 FIFA U-17 World Cup in Indonesia.

Team	Qualified on	Previous appearances in FIFA U-17 World Cup^{1}
Mexico	21 February 2023	14 (1985, 1987, 1991, 1993, 1997, 1999, 2003, **2005**, 2009, **2011**, 2013, 2015, 2017, 2019)
United States	21 February 2023	17 (1985, 1987, 1989, 1991, 1993, 1995, 1997, 1999, 2001, 2003, 2005, 2007, 2009, 2011, 2015, 2017, 2019)
Canada	22 February 2023	7 (1987, 1989, 1993, 1995, 2011, 2013, 2019)
Panama	22 February 2023	2 (2011, 2013)

^{1} Bold indicates champions for that year. Italic indicates hosts for that year.
