= Victor Fung (footballer) =

Venezuelan footballer (born 2007)

Personal information
- Full name: Victor Hugo Fung
- Date of birth: 13 August 2007 (age 19)
- Place of birth: Montreal, Quebec, Canada
- Height: 1.83 m (6 ft 0 in)
- Position: Centre-back

Youth career
- 2019–2025: Inter Miami CF

College career
Years	Team	Apps	(Gls)
2025–	Stanford Cardinal		

Senior career*
Years	Team	Apps	(Gls)
2025	Inter Miami II	0	(0)

International career^{‡}
2022–2023	Canada U17	7	(0)
2024	Venezuela U18		
- * Club domestic league appearances and goals as of 6 March 2025 ‡ National team caps and goals as of 1 February 2025

Victor Hugo Fung (born 13 August 2007) is a professional footballer who plays as a central defender for Stanford Cardinal. Born in Canada, he represents Venezuela at youth level.

== Club career ==
Victor Fung began his football career in August 2019 by joining the Inter Miami CF Academy, where he initially captained the U-13 team. He subsequently played a pivotal role in winning the MLS NEXT Cup national championship in 2022 with the U-15 team. His consistent performances earned him promotion to the academy's U-20 team that competed in the UPSL during the 2023 season, where he also served as captain and regular starter.

In March 2024, Fung joined Inter Miami CF II, the affiliate team that competes in MLS Next Pro, signing a contract that ran until December 2024. During the 2024 season, although he was on the bench for the first two games, he did not make his official league debut. In March 2025, he renewed his contract with Inter Miami CF II until December 2025.

== International career ==
Fung represented Canada at the youth international level, making his debut with the U-17 national team.

On 11 February 2023, he made his first appearance for Canada's U-17 team as a defender in a 3–2 victory against Trinidad and Tobago's U-17 squad during the 2023 CONCACAF U-17 Championship. His performances in the tournament earned him a spot in the squad for the 2023 FIFA U-17 World Cup. He made his World Cup debut in a group-stage match against Spain, which ended in a 2–0 defeat.

In 2024, Fung played for the Venezuela U18 in an unofficial tournament. On 9 January 2025, his request to switch international allegiance to Venezuela was approved by FIFA. 11 days later, he was called up by the Venezuela U-20 national team to participate in the 2025 South American U-20 Championship. Throughout the tournament, he remained on the bench as an unused substitute in all matches.

== Personal life ==
Born in Canada, Fung is of Venezuelan-Chinese descent. He speaks Chinese, English and Spanish. Shortly after his birth, he moved with his family to Caracas, Venezuela and lived there until age 6, when he relocated to Weston, Florida, U.S.

In 2024, Fung was officially granted Venezuelan nationality.
