= Israel Tello =

Mexican footballer (born 2006)

Personal information
- Full name: Israel Tello Robles
- Date of birth: 18 January 2006 (age 20)
- Place of birth: Benito Juárez, Quintana Roo, Mexico
- Height: 1.74 m (5 ft 9 in)
- Position: Central midfielder

Team information
- Current team: Necaxa
- Number: 188

Youth career
- 2021–: Necaxa

Senior career*
Years	Team	Apps	(Gls)
2026–	Necaxa	11	(0)

International career^{‡}
2023	Mexico U17	2	(0)
Medal record
Men's football
Representing Mexico
CONCACAF U-17 Championship
Winner	2023 Guatemala
Central American and Caribbean Games
Silver medal – second place	2026 Santo Domingo
- * Club domestic league appearances and goals as of 12 June 2026 ‡ National team caps and goals as of 12 June 2026

Israel Tello Robles (born 18 January 2006) is a Mexican professional footballer who plays as a central midfielder for Liga MX club Necaxa.

== Club career ==
Tello began his career at the academy of Necaxa academy before making his professional debut on 31 January 2026 in a 0–2 loss to América where he played 46 minutes.

== Career statistics ==
=== Club ===
As of 12 June 2026

Appearances and goals by club, season and competition
Club	Season	League			Cup		Continental		Other		Total	
Club	Season	Division	Apps	Goals	Apps	Goals	Apps	Goals	Apps	Goals	Apps	Goals
Necaxa	2025–26	Liga MX	11	0	—		—		—		11	0
Career total			11	0	0	0	0	0	0	0	11	0

== Honours ==
Mexico

- CONCACAF U-17 Championship: 2023
