= Nayrobi Vargas =

Honduran footballer (born 2006)

Personal information
- Full name: Nayrobi Isaí Vargas Valerio
- Date of birth: 20 May 2006 (age 20)
- Place of birth: San Pedro Sula, Honduras
- Height: 1.90 m (6 ft 3 in)
- Position: Forward

Team information
- Current team: Marathón

Youth career
- 2016: IDF
- 2017–2023: FC Dallas
- 2024: Mainz 05

Senior career*
| Years | Team | Apps | (Gls) |
| 2023 | North Texas SC | 15 | (2) |
| 2024–2026 | Mainz 05 II | 28 | (1) |
| 2026– | Marathón | 0 | (0) |

International career
| 2022–2023 | Honduras U17 | 14 | (9) |
| 2025 | Honduras U21 | 3 | (0) |
- * Club domestic league appearances and goals as of 16 June 2026

Nayrobi Isaí Vargas Valerio (born 20 May 2006) is a Honduran professional footballer who plays as a forward for Liga Nacional club Marathón.

== Club career ==
=== Youth ===
Vargas started his youth playing career at Inter Development Fútbol Club (IDF), and later joined the youth setup of Major League Soccer club FC Dallas. In April 2023, Vargas signed with MLS Next Pro club North Texas SC, the reserve side of FC Dallas.

On 28 June 2024, Vargas signed with Regionalliga Südwest club Mainz 05 II. Over two seasons, Vargas recorded one goal and three assists in 28 appearances for the club. In May 2026, Mainz 05 announced that his contract would not be renewed. The following 15 June, Vargas was announced as a new signing for Liga Nacional de Fútbol de Honduras club Marathón.

== International career ==
Vargas has represented Honduras at youth level

== Personal life ==
Born in Honduras, Vargas is of Guatemalan descent through his paternal grandmother.
