= Ángel Leyva =

Mexican footballer (born 2006)

Personal information
- Full name: Ángel Alberto Leyva Serrano
- Date of birth: 13 October 2006 (age 20)
- Place of birth: Sinaloa, Mexico
- Height: 1.84 m (6 ft 0 in)
- Position: Centre-back

Team information
- Current team: Puebla
- Number: 2

Youth career
- 2021–2026: Mazatlán

Senior career*
Years	Team	Apps	(Gls)
2025–2026	Mazatlán	16	(0)
2026–	Puebla	4	(0)
- * Club domestic league appearances and goals as of 20 November 2026

Ángel Alberto Leyva Serrano (born 13 October 2006) is a Mexican professional footballer who plays as a centre-back for Liga MX club Puebla.

== Club career ==
Leyva began his career at the academy of Mazatlán, where he made his professional debut on 19 April 2025 in a 0–5 loss to América, where he was subbed in at the 83rd minute.

On 1 June 2026, Leyva signed with Puebla.

== Career statistics ==
=== Club ===
As of match played on 20 November 2026

Appearances and goals by club, season and competition
Club	Season	League			Cup		Continental		Other		Total	
Club	Season	Division	Apps	Goals	Apps	Goals	Apps	Goals	Apps	Goals	Apps	Goals
Mazatlán	2024–25	Liga MX	1	0	—		—		—		1	0
Mazatlán	2025–26	Liga MX	15	0	—		—		1 (Note: Appearances in Leagues Cup)	0	16	0
Mazatlán	Total		16	0	—		—		1	0	17	0
Puebla	2026–27	Liga MX	4	0	—		—		1	0	5	0
Career total			20	0	0	0	0	0	2	0	22	0
