= Gustavo Lozano =

Gustavo Lozano may refer to:

- Gustavo Lozano (botanist) (1938-2000), Colombian botanist
- Gustavo Lozano (swimmer) (born 1951), Mexican swimmer
