= Cruz Medina =

American soccer player (born 2006)

Personal information
- Full name: Cruz Ivan Medina
- Date of birth: September 24, 2006 (age 20)
- Place of birth: San Francisco, California, US
- Height: 1.75 m (5 ft 9 in)
- Position: Midfielder

Team information
- Current team: Tapatío (on loan from San Jose Earthquakes)
- Number: 50

Youth career
- 2010–2017: Bay City Club
- 2017–2019: San Francisco Glens
- 2019–2022: San Jose Earthquakes

Senior career*
Years	Team	Apps	(Gls)
2022–	San Jose Earthquakes	0	(0)
2022–2025	→ San Jose Earthquakes II (loan)	88	(13)
2026–	→ Tapatío (loan)	17	(3)

International career^{‡}
2022	United States U16	3	(1)
2022–2023	United States U17	19	(6)
2024	United States U19	3	(0)
2024–	United States U20	7	(2)
Medal record
Men's football
Representing United States
CONCACAF U-20 Championship
Runner-up	2024 Mexico
- * Club domestic league appearances and goals as of October 31, 2026 ‡ National team caps and goals as of 00:32, September 12, 2026 (UTC)

Cruz Ivan Medina (born September 24, 2006) is an American professional soccer player who plays as a midfielder for Liga de Expansión MX club Tapatío, on loan from Major League Soccer club San Jose Earthquakes.

== Career ==
Medina began played soccer at the age of 4 with the Bay City Club, where his father was the manager. From 2017 through 2019, he played for the San Francisco Glens in the U.S. Soccer Development Academy, tallying 31 goals and 28 assists at the Under-13 level. On August 4, 2019, he moved to the youth academy of the San Jose Earthquakes. He earned the U15 Golden Ball at the 2021 MLS Next Cup and went on trial with European giants Bayern Munich. On June 3, 2022, he signed a homegrown contract with the San Jose Earthquakes until 2027 at the age of 15 years and 252 days old, the third youngest to do so at that time.

For his first two seasons as a developing professional (2022–23), Medina played with the Earthquakes' second team in MLS NEXT Pro, which will now be known as The Town FC starting with the 2024 season. He made his Quakes first-team debut at age 15 on July 20, 2022, in a friendly against Spanish club Celta de Vigo. As a member of Earthquakes II in 2023, Medina collected two goals and two assists to help the club qualify for its first ever berth in the MLS NEXT Pro Playoffs. In October 2023, he was named to The Guardian's Next Generation 2023 list of the best young talents in world football.

== International career ==
Born in the United States, Medina is of Mexican descent through his grandparents. He played for the United States U-17s as they came in second for the 2023 CONCACAF U-17 Championship. He later started multiple games for the U.S. U-17 team in the 2023 FIFA U-17 World Cup, reaching the Round of 16. In March 2024, he joined the Mexico U-20 team for training camp before reporting back to the U.S. U-19 team training camp two weeks later.
