= Giandro Sambo =

Dutch footballer (born 2006)

Personal information
- Full name: Giandro Alejandro Sambo
- Date of birth: 28 August 2006 (age 20)
- Place of birth: Den Helder, Netherlands
- Position: Winger

Team information
- Current team: Heracles Almelo

Youth career
- –2018: AFC '34
- 2018–2023: Ajax
- 2023–2024: FC Twente / Heracles Academy

Senior career*
Years	Team	Apps	(Gls)
2024–	Heracles Almelo	2	(0)

International career^{‡}
2023	Curaçao U17	3	(1)
- * Club domestic league appearances and goals as of 16 June 2025 ‡ National team caps and goals as of 16 June 2025

Giandro Alejandro Sambo (born 28 August 2006) is a Dutch professional footballer who plays as a winger for Heracles Almelo.

== Club career ==
Sambo was scouted by Ajax while playing for AFC '34 in Alkmaar. He spent five years in Ajax's youth academy before joining the FC Twente / Heracles Academy for one season.

On 10 August 2024, Sambo signed his first professional contract with Heracles Almelo. He made his first-team debut in the opening match of the 2024–25 season against Sparta Rotterdam, which ended in a 0–0 draw. He came on in the 83rd minute as a substitute for Juho Talvitie.

== International career ==
Sambo has represented Curaçao at youth international level. He played three friendly matches for the Curaçao under-17 team and scored once against Guatemala.

== Career statistics ==
Appearances and goals by club, season and competition
Club	Season	League			Cup		Total	
Club	Season	Division	Apps	Goals	Apps	Goals	Apps	Goals
Heracles Almelo	2024–25	Eredivisie	2	0	0	0	2	0
Career total			2	0	0	0	2	0
