= Gael Álvarez =

Mexican footballer (born 2006)

Personal information
- Full name: Gael Arturo Álvarez Montiel
- Date of birth: 9 March 2006 (age 20)
- Place of birth: Guasave, Sinaloa, Mexico
- Height: 1.66 m (5 ft 5 in)
- Position: Midfielder

Team information
- Current team: Pachuca
- Number: 187

Youth career
- 2015–2017: Tuzos
- 2018–: Pachuca

Senior career*
Years	Team	Apps	(Gls)
2024–	Pachuca	17	(0)

International career^{‡}
- Mexico U15
2022	Mexico U16	3	(0)
2021–	Mexico U17	15	(2)
Medal record
Men's football
Representing Mexico
CONCACAF U-17 Championship
Winner	2023 Guatemala
- * Club domestic league appearances and goals as of 21 October 2026 ‡ National team caps and goals as of 19 September 2023

Gael Arturo Álvarez Montiel (born 9 March 2006) is a Mexican professional footballer who plays as a midfielder for Liga MX club Pachuca.

== Early life ==
Born in Guasave in the state of Sinaloa in Mexico, Álvarez was raised in the Barrio del Chaleco, where he played football on local pitches with his brother and father.

== Club career ==
Álvarez started at the Age of 9, at Tuzos Guasave FC. He then joined the academy of professional side Pachuca at under-13 level. In April 2023, Álvarez represented Pachuca at the Future Cup, hosted by Dutch side Ajax, where he caught the eye of a number of clubs across Europe. In August of the same year, he was taken on trial by Dutch Eredivisie side Feyenoord, though he was only allowed by Pachuca to spend fifteen days on the trial, as he was still a minor, with the club affirming that Álvarez was "non-transferrable".

On 11 October 2023, he was named by English newspaper The Guardian as one of the best players born in 2006 worldwide.

== International career ==
Álvarez was called up to Mexico's under-16 squad for the 2022 edition of the Montaigu Tournament, as Mexico finished in eighth position.

Having represented Mexico's under-17 team since 2021, Carrillo was called up to the squad for the 2023 CONCACAF U-17 Championship. He scored Mexico's opening goal of the tournament, a second minute scissor kick in an eventual 9–0 win against Curaçao, before adding to his tally in Mexico's 6–0 win against Nicaragua in the round of sixteen. For his performances, he was named 'player of the tournament', as Mexico won the competition, beating the United States 3–1 in the final.

== Career statistics ==
=== Club ===
As of match played on 21 October 2026

Club	Season	League			Cup		Continental		Other		Total	
Club	Season	Division	Apps	Goals	Apps	Goals	Apps	Goals	Apps	Goals	Apps	Goals
Pachuca	2024–25	Liga MX	5	0	—		—		3 (Note: Appearances in Leagues Cup)	0	8	0
Pachuca	2025–26	Liga MX	5	0	—		—		—		5	0
Pachuca	2026–27	Liga MX	7	0	—		—		3	0	10	0
Career total			17	0	0	0	0	0	6	0	23	0

== Honours ==
Individual

- CONCACAF Under-17 Championship Golden Ball: 2023
- CONCACAF Under-17 Championship Best XI: 2023
- IFFHS CONCACAF Youth (U20) Best XI: 2024
