= Joaquín Moxica =

Mexican footballer (born 2006)

Personal information
- Full name: Joaquín Alejandro Moxica Chapa
- Date of birth: 27 January 2006 (age 20)
- Place of birth: Monterrey, Nuevo León, Mexico
- Height: 1.76 m (5 ft 9 in)
- Position: Forward

Team information
- Current team: Atlante (on loan from Monterrey)
- Number: 11

Youth career
- 2021–: Monterrey

Senior career*
| Years | Team | Apps | (Gls) |
| 2023– | Monterrey | 14 | (1) |
| 2026– | → Atlante (loan) | 14 | (0) |

International career^{‡}
| 2023 | Mexico U17 | 7 | (1) |
Medal record
Men's football
Representing Mexico
CONCACAF U-17 Championship
| Winner | 2023 Guatemala |
Central American and Caribbean Games
| Silver medal – second place | 2026 Santo Domingo |
- * Club domestic league appearances and goals as of 20 November 2026 ‡ National team caps and goals as of 2 July 2026

Joaquín Alejandro Moxica Chapa (born 27 January 2006) is a Mexican professional footballer who plays as a forward for Liga MX club Atlante, on loan from Monterrey.

== Club career ==
=== Monterrey ===
Moxica began his career at the academy of Monterrey, where he progressed through all categories, until he made his professional debut on 6 November 2023, in a 2–0 win against Pachuca, being subbed in at the 75th minute.

==== Loan to Atlante ====
On 27 June 2026, Moxica was loaned to Atlante and made his team debut on 11 August in a 1–3 Leagues Cup loss to Minnesota United where he was subbed in at the 61st minute. Five days later, he made his Liga MX debut with the team in a 0–0 draw with Toluca where he was subbed in at the 80th minute.

== Career statistics ==
=== Club ===
As of match played on 20 November 2026

Appearances and goals by club, season and competition
| Club | Season | League | | | Cup | | Continental | | Intercontinental | | Other | | Total | |
| Club | Season | Division | Apps | Goals | Apps | Goals | Apps | Goals | Apps | Goals | Apps | Goals | Apps | Goals |
|---|---|---|---|---|---|---|---|---|---|---|---|---|---|---|
| Monterrey | 2023–24 | Liga MX | 1 | 0 | — | | — | | — | | — | | 1 | 0 |
| Monterrey | 2024–25 | Liga MX | 2 | 0 | — | | — | | — | | — | | 2 | 0 |
| Monterrey | 2025–26 | Liga MX | 11 | 1 | — | | 1 (Note: Appearances in CONCACAF Champions Cup) | 0 | — | | 3 (Note: Appearances in Leagues Cup) | 0 | 15 | 1 |
| Monterrey | Total | | 14 | 1 | — | | 1 | 0 | — | | 3 | 0 | 18 | 1 |
| Atlante (loan) | 2026–27 | Liga MX | 14 | 0 | — | | — | | — | | 1 | 0 | 15 | 0 |
| Career total | | | 28 | 1 | 0 | 0 | 1 | 0 | 0 | 0 | 4 | 0 | 33 | 1 |
