= 2017 CONCACAF U-17 Championship qualifying =

== Caribbean Zone ==
2016 CFU Men's U-17 Tournament
Tournament details
- Host countries: St. Kitts and Nevis; Cayman Islands; St. Vincent and the Grenadines; U.S. Virgin Islands; Guadeloupe; Suriname; Trinidad and Tobago (final round)
- Dates: 15 July – 25 September 2016
- Teams: 25 (total) (from 1 sub-confederation)

Final positions
- Champions: Haiti
- Runners-up: Cuba
- Third place: Jamaica
- Fourth place: Curaçao

Tournament statistics
- Matches played: 52
- Goals scored: 210 (4.04 per match)

The format and dates were published on 24 June 2016.

=== Teams ===
A total of 25 teams entered the tournament.

Round	Teams entering round	No. of teams
Did not enter	Bonaire; French Guiana; Montserrat; Sint Maarten; Turks and Caicos Islands; Martinique	6
First round	Anguilla; Antigua and Barbuda; Aruba; Bahamas; Barbados; Bermuda; British Virgin Islands; Cayman Islands; Cuba; Curaçao; Dominica; Dominican Republic; Grenada; Guadeloupe; Guyana; Haiti; Jamaica; Puerto Rico; Saint Kitts and Nevis; Saint Lucia; Saint Vincent and the Grenadines; Saint Martin; Suriname; U.S. Virgin Islands	24
Second round	Trinidad and Tobago	1

=== First round ===
==== Group 1 ====
Pos	Team	Pld	W	D	L	GF	GA	GD	Pts	Qualification
1	Cuba	3	3	0	0	19	0	+19	9	Final round
2	Barbados	3	1	1	1	7	9	−2	4	
3	Saint Kitts and Nevis (H)	3	1	1	1	4	8	−4	4	
4	Dominica	3	0	0	3	3	16	−13	0	

Source: CFU
(H) Hosts
20 July 2016
16:30

Dominica	0–9	Cuba
	Report (CONCACAF); Report (CFU)	Savigne 5', 31', 90+1'; Roldan 10' (pen.), 21'; Romero 38', 39'; Rosette 43'; Cabrera 81'

Warner Park Sporting Complex, Basseterre
Referee: William Anderson (Puerto Rico)
20 July 2016
19:00

Saint Kitts and Nevis	2–2	Barbados
Morton 4'; Brooks 57'	Report (CONCACAF); Report (CFU)	Francis 56'; Chandler 90+1'

Warner Park Sporting Complex, Basseterre
Referee: Dwight Royal (Jamaica)

22 July 2016
16:30

Cuba	5–0	Barbados
Ibarra 2'; Rosette 9'; Roldan 52'; Savigne 61'; Duarte 83'	Report (CONCACAF); Report (CFU)

Warner Park Sporting Complex, Basseterre
Referee: Adzer Arisnat (Haiti)
22 July 2016
19:00

Saint Kitts and Nevis	2–1	Dominica
Patrick 27'; Brooks 73'	Report (CONCACAF); Report (CFU)	Coipel 39'

Warner Park Sporting Complex, Basseterre
Referee: Karl Tyrell (Jamaica)

24 July 2016
16:30

Barbados	5–2	Dominica
Humpreys 5' (o.g.); Brathwaite 54', 60'; Howell 58'; Reid Stephen 83'	Report (CONCACAF); Report (CFU)	Martin 10'; Coipel 31'

Warner Park Sporting Complex, Basseterre
Referee: Dwight Royal (Jamaica)
24 July 2016
19:00

Saint Kitts and Nevis	0–5	Cuba
	Report (CONCACAF); Report (CFU)	Roldan 6', 20'; Romero 8'; Douglas 80' (o.g.); Rosette 89'

Warner Park Sporting Complex, Basseterre
Referee: William Anderson (Puerto Rico)

==== Group 2 ====
Pos	Team	Pld	W	D	L	GF	GA	GD	Pts	Qualification
1	Haiti	3	3	0	0	17	2	+15	9	Final round
2	Cayman Islands (H)	3	2	0	1	8	4	+4	6	
3	Aruba	3	1	0	2	2	15	−13	3	
4	Puerto Rico	3	0	0	3	1	7	−6	0	

Source: CFU
(H) Hosts
20 July 2016
17:00

Puerto Rico	0–3	Haiti
	Report (CONCACAF); Report (CFU)	Saint-Duc 19'; Jean Jacques 26'; Elysee 79'

Truman Bodden Sports Complex, George Town
Referee: Wilson da Costa (Bahamas)
20 July 2016
19:30

Cayman Islands	4–0	Aruba
Ebanks 10'; Clarke-Ramirez 44'; Foster 54'; Parchmont 85' (pen.)	Report (CONCACAF); Report (CFU)

Truman Bodden Sports Complex, George Town
Referee: Yadel Martinez Pupo (Cuba)

22 July 2016
17:00

Haiti	10–0	Aruba
Mondestin 4'; Saint-Duc 11', 20', 41' (pen.), 44' (pen.), 54'; Sainvius 18'; Thijsen 25' (o.g.); Elysee 59', 79'	Report (CONCACAF); Report (CFU)

Truman Bodden Sports Complex, George Town
Referee: Juan Carlos Hidalgo (Dominican Republic)
22 July 2016
19:30

Cayman Islands	2–0	Puerto Rico
Bodden 24'; Parchmont 41'	Report (CONCACAF); Report (CFU)

Truman Bodden Sports Complex, George Town
Referee: Veralton Nembhard (Jamaica)

24 July 2016
17:00

Aruba	2–1	Puerto Rico
Ras 20'; Monticeux 57'	Report (CONCACAF); Report (CFU)	Torres Arroyo 4'

Truman Bodden Sports Complex, George Town
Referee: Wilson da Costa (Bahamas)
24 July 2016
19:30

Cayman Islands	2–4	Haiti
Parchmont 3' (pen.); Bodden 11'	Report (CONCACAF); Report (CFU)	Elysee 42'; Clerge 62'; Basquin 77'; Saint-Duc 90+5'

Truman Bodden Sports Complex, George Town
Referee: Yadel Martinez Pupo (Cuba)

==== Group 3 ====
Pos	Team	Pld	W	D	L	GF	GA	GD	Pts	Qualification
1	Bermuda	3	2	1	0	4	2	+2	7	Final round
2	Saint Lucia	3	2	0	1	8	2	+6	6	
3	Grenada	3	1	1	1	3	3	0	4	
4	Saint Vincent and the Grenadines (H)	3	0	0	3	0	8	−8	0	

Source: CFU
(H) Hosts
20 July 2016
16:00

Bermuda	2–1	Saint Lucia
Crichlow 43'; Williams 82'	Report (CONCACAF); Report (CFU)	Biscette 27'

Victoria Park, Kingstown
Referee: Kerry Skepple (Antigua and Barbuda)
20 July 2016
18:30

Saint Vincent and the Grenadines	0–2	Grenada
	Report (CONCACAF); Report (CFU)	Williams 45+1'; Clare 49'

Victoria Park, Kingstown
Referee: Sherwin Moore (Guyana)

22 July 2016
16:00

Saint Lucia	2–0	Grenada
Clovis 38'; Sylvester 88'	Report (CONCACAF); Report (CFU)

Victoria Park, Kingstown
Referee: Marcos Brea Despaigne (Cuba)
22 July 2016
18:30

Saint Vincent and the Grenadines	0–1	Bermuda
	Report (CONCACAF); Report (CFU)	Burgess 4'

Victoria Park, Kingstown
Referee: Sherwin Johnson (Guyana)

24 July 2016
16:00

Grenada	1–1	Bermuda
Maitland 83'	Report (CONCACAF); Report (CFU)	Jones 12'

Victoria Park, Kingstown
Referee: Sherwin Moore (Guyana)
24 July 2016
18:30

Saint Vincent and the Grenadines	0–5	Saint Lucia
	Report (CONCACAF); Report (CFU)	Clovis 18', 64', 66'; Lendor 21'; Polius 52'

Victoria Park, Kingstown
Referee: Marcos Brea Despaigne (Cuba)

==== Group 4 ====
Pos	Team	Pld	W	D	L	GF	GA	GD	Pts	Qualification
1	Jamaica	3	3	0	0	16	2	+14	9	Final round
2	Antigua and Barbuda	3	2	0	1	9	4	+5	6	
3	Guyana	3	1	0	2	2	7	−5	3	
4	U.S. Virgin Islands (H)	3	0	0	3	1	15	−14	0	

Source: CFU
(H) Hosts
15 July 2016
14:30

Guyana	1–4	Jamaica
Swel-Case 31'	Report (CONCACAF); Report (CFU)	Topey 16'; Senior 51', 74'; Parris 65'

Ivanna Eudora Kean High School, Charlotte Amalie
Referee: Kimbell Ward (Saint Kitts and Nevis)
15 July 2016
17:00

U.S. Virgin Islands	1–5	Antigua and Barbuda
McGuinness 37'	Report (CONCACAF); Report (CFU)	Knight 12', 64', 82'; Challenger 45+3'; Joseph 55'

Ivanna Eudora Kean High School, Charlotte Amalie
Referee: Moeth Gaymes (Saint Vincent and the Grenadines)

17 July 2016
14:30

Jamaica	3–1	Antigua and Barbuda
Verley 14'; Parris 37'; Senior 88'	Report (CONCACAF); Report (CFU)	Sheppard 84'

Ivanna Eudora Kean High School, Charlotte Amalie
Referee: Mike Van de Sande (Curaçao)
17 July 2016
17:00

U.S. Virgin Islands	0–1	Guyana
	Report (CONCACAF); Report (CFU)	Ferreira 13'

Ivanna Eudora Kean High School, Charlotte Amalie
Referee: Tristley Bassue (Saint Kitts and Nevis)

19 July 2016
14:30

Antigua and Barbuda	3–0	Guyana
Knight 45+2'; Sheppard 58'; Hill 88'	Report (CONCACAF); Report (CFU)

Ivanna Eudora Kean High School, Charlotte Amalie
Referee: Mike Van de Sande (Curaçao)
19 July 2016
17:00

U.S. Virgin Islands	0–9	Jamaica
	Report (CONCACAF); Report (CFU)	Briscoe 15', 40'; Atkinson 29'; Verley 33'; Osei 36'; Parris 76'; Letts 78', 85'; Thompson 83'

Ivanna Eudora Kean High School, Charlotte Amalie
Referee: Moeth Gaymes (Saint Vincent and the Grenadines)

==== Group 5 ====
Pos	Team	Pld	W	D	L	GF	GA	GD	Pts	Qualification
1	Curaçao	3	2	1	0	14	2	+12	7	Final round
2	Guadeloupe (H)	3	2	1	0	11	0	+11	7	Final round
3	Dominican Republic	3	1	0	2	6	9	−3	3	
4	Saint Martin	3	0	0	3	2	22	−20	0	

Source: CFU
(H) Hosts
20 July 2016
16:30

Dominican Republic	2–4	Curaçao
Feliz 5', 72'	Report (CONCACAF); Report (CFU)	Vrutaal 31'; Bernadina 50', 61'; Ortega 80' (o.g.)

Stade Fiesque Duchesne, Baie-Mahault
Referee: Johannes Dolaini (Suriname)
20 July 2016
19:00

Guadeloupe	8–0	Saint Martin
De Ravaliere 43'; Landre 51'; Laurent 65'; Govindin 66'; Zubar 78'; Talbot 82'; Mauranyapin 85', 90+1'	Report (CONCACAF); Report (CFU)

Stade Fiesque Duchesne, Baie-Mahault
Referee: Rodphin Harris (Trinidad and Tobago)

22 July 2016
16:30

Curaçao	10–0	Saint Martin
Fransinet 17', 22', 71', 90+1'; Bernadina 24', 67', 76', 89'; Vrutaal 48'; Oleana 78'	Report (CONCACAF); Report (CFU)

Stade Fiesque Duchesne, Baie-Mahault
Referee: Keon Yorke (Trinidad and Tobago)
22 July 2016
19:00

Guadeloupe	3–0	Dominican Republic
De Ravaliere 41'; Landre 77'; Govindin 84'	Report (CONCACAF); Report (CFU)

Stade Fiesque Duchesne, Baie-Mahault
Referee: Ricangel De Leca (Aruba)

24 July 2016
16:30

Saint Martin	2–4	Dominican Republic
Adams 7', 76' (pen.)	Report (CONCACAF); Report (CFU)	Castillo 15'; Feliz 46', 51'; Angeles Cruz 80'

Stade Fiesque Duchesne, Baie-Mahault
Referee: Johannes Dolaini (Suriname)
24 July 2016
19:00

Guadeloupe	0–0	Curaçao
	Report (CONCACAF); Report (CFU)

Stade Fiesque Duchesne, Baie-Mahault
Referee: Rodphin Harris (Trinidad and Tobago)

==== Group 6 ====
Pos	Team	Pld	W	D	L	GF	GA	GD	Pts	Qualification
1	Suriname (H)	3	3	0	0	11	1	+10	9	Final round
2	Bahamas	3	1	0	2	3	3	0	3	
3	British Virgin Islands	3	1	0	2	1	5	−4	3	
4	Anguilla	3	1	0	2	2	8	−6	3	

Source: CFU
(H) Hosts
20 July 2016
14:30

British Virgin Islands	1–0	Bahamas
Forbes 88'	Report (CONCACAF); Report (CFU)

Dr. Ir. Franklin Essed Stadion, Paramaribo
Referee: Bryan Willett (Antigua and Barbuda)
20 July 2016
17:00

Suriname	6–0	Anguilla
Hoever 16', 23', 64'; Marsidin 38'; Aloewel 75'; Vola 80'	Report (CONCACAF); Report (CFU)

Dr. Ir. Franklin Essed Stadion, Paramaribo
Referee: Javier Santos (Puerto Rico)

22 July 2016
14:30

Bahamas	2–0	Anguilla
Charles 11'; Dias 22'	Report (CONCACAF); Report (CFU)

Dr. Ir. Franklin Essed Stadion, Paramaribo
Referee: Walner Laventure (Haiti)
22 July 2016
17:00

Suriname	3–0	British Virgin Islands
Eenig 5'; Hoever 51'; Saino 59'	Report (CONCACAF); Report (CFU)

Dr. Ir. Franklin Essed Stadion, Paramaribo
Referee: Michel Raynel Rodríguez Roque (Cuba)

24 July 2016
14:30

Anguilla	2–0	British Virgin Islands
Smith 65'; Richardson 87'	Report (CONCACAF); Report (CFU)

Dr. Ir. Franklin Essed Stadion, Paramaribo
Referee: Michel Raynel Rodríguez Roque (Cuba)
24 July 2016
17:00

Suriname	2–1	Bahamas
Eenig 23'; Hoever 84'	Report (CONCACAF); Report (CFU)	Farquharson 90+1'

Dr. Ir. Franklin Essed Stadion, Paramaribo
Referee: Javier Santos (Puerto Rico)

==== Ranking of second-placed teams ====
The best runners-up from the group stage will also qualify for the final round.

Pos	Grp	Team	Pld	W	D	L	GF	GA	GD	Pts	Qualification
1	5	Guadeloupe	3	2	1	0	11	0	+11	7	Final round
2	3	Saint Lucia	3	2	0	1	8	2	+6	6	
3	4	Antigua and Barbuda	3	2	0	1	9	4	+5	6	
4	2	Cayman Islands	3	2	0	1	8	4	+4	6	
5	1	Barbados	3	1	1	1	7	9	−2	4	
6	6	Bahamas	3	1	0	2	3	3	0	3	

Source: CFU

=== Final round ===
==== Group A ====
Pos	Team	Pld	W	D	L	GF	GA	GD	Pts	Qualification
1	Haiti	3	2	1	0	7	0	+7	7	Semi-finals and 2017 CONCACAF U-17 Championship
2	Jamaica	3	2	1	0	9	4	+5	7	Semi-finals and 2017 CONCACAF U-17 Championship
3	Trinidad and Tobago (H)	3	1	0	2	5	7	−2	3	
4	Bermuda	3	0	0	3	4	14	−10	0	

Source: CFU
(H) Hosts
16 September 2016
16:00

Bermuda	2–6	Jamaica
Jones 30'; Russell 81'	Report (CONCACAF); Report (CFU)	Senior 5'; Parris 17', 72' (pen.); Edwards 36'; Daley 42'; Russell 90+1' (o.g.)

Ato Boldon Stadium, Couva
16 September 2016
18:30

Haiti	2–0	Trinidad and Tobago
Elysee 22'; Saint-Duc 67'	Report (CONCACAF); Report (CFU)

Ato Boldon Stadium, Couva
Referee: William Anderson (Puerto Rico)

18 September 2016
15:00

Jamaica	0–0	Haiti
	Report (CONCACAF); Report (CFU)

Ato Boldon Stadium, Couva
Referee: Tristley Bassue (Saint Kitts and Nevis)
18 September 2016
17:30

Trinidad and Tobago	3–2	Bermuda
Benny 70'; Prowell 73', 90+2'	Report (CONCACAF); Report (CFU)	Russell 11', 26'

Ato Boldon Stadium, Couva
Referee: Ricangel De Leca (Aruba)

20 September 2016
16:00

Haiti	5–0	Bermuda
Elysee 2'; Saint-Duc 45+2', 70'; Mondestin 65'; Moore 86' (o.g.)	Report (CONCACAF); Report (CFU)

Ato Boldon Stadium, Couva
Referee: Kimbell Ward (Saint Kitts and Nevis)
20 September 2016
18:30

Trinidad and Tobago	2–3	Jamaica
Lammy 47'; Prowell 57'	Report (CONCACAF); Report (CFU)	Senior 13', 74'; Daley 35'

Ato Boldon Stadium, Couva

==== Group B ====
Pos	Team	Pld	W	D	L	GF	GA	GD	Pts	Qualification
1	Cuba	3	3	0	0	10	2	+8	9	Semi-finals and 2017 CONCACAF U-17 Championship
2	Curaçao	3	1	1	1	4	3	+1	4	Semi-finals and 2017 CONCACAF U-17 Championship
3	Suriname	3	1	0	2	4	5	−1	3	2017 CONCACAF U-17 Championship
4	Guadeloupe	3	0	1	2	0	8	−8	1	

Source: CFU
17 September 2016
15:00

Suriname	2–0	Guadeloupe
Hoever 21', 52'	Report (CFU)

Hasely Crawford Stadium, Port of Spain
17 September 2016
17:30

Cuba	2–1	Curaçao
Romero 37'; Roldan 78'	Report (CFU)	Fransinet 57' (pen.)

Hasely Crawford Stadium, Port of Spain
Referee: Kimbell Ward (Saint Kitts and Nevis)

19 September 2016
16:00

Guadeloupe	0–6	Cuba
	Report (CONCACAF); Report (CFU)	Romero 31'; Roldan 35'; Turka 58'; Cruz 75'; Savigne 86', 90+3'

Hasely Crawford Stadium, Port of Spain
Referee: Sherwin Johnson (Guyana)
19 September 2016
18:30

Curaçao	3–1	Suriname
Bernadina 10', 29'; Fransinet 45+1'	Report (CONCACAF); Report (CFU)	Eenig 4'

Hasely Crawford Stadium, Port of Spain
Referee: Moeth Gaymes (Saint Vincent and the Grenadines)

21 September 2016
16:00

Curaçao	0–0	Guadeloupe
	Report (CONCACAF); Report (CFU)

Hasely Crawford Stadium, Port of Spain
21 September 2016
18:30

Cuba	2–1	Suriname
Rosette 45+1'; Savigne 81'	Report (CONCACAF); Report (CFU)	Eenig 45'

Hasely Crawford Stadium, Port of Spain
Referee: William Anderson (Puerto Rico)

==== Ranking of third-placed teams ====
The best third-placed team from the final round group stage also qualified for the 2017 CONCACAF U-17 Championship.

Pos	Grp	Team	Pld	W	D	L	GF	GA	GD	Pts	Qualification
1	B	Suriname	3	1	0	2	4	5	−1	3	2017 CONCACAF U-17 Championship
2	A	Trinidad and Tobago	3	1	0	2	5	7	−2	3	

Source: CFU

==== Semi-finals ====
23 September 2016
16:00

Haiti	3–1	Curaçao
Saint-Duc 14'; Mondestin 71' (pen.); Casseus 89'	Report (CONCACAF); Report (CFU)	Vrutaal 11' (pen.)

Ato Boldon Stadium, Couva
Referee: Kimbell Ward (Saint Kitts and Nevis)
23 September 2016
18:30

Cuba	1–0	Jamaica
Savigne 59'	Report (CONCACAF); Report (CFU)

Ato Boldon Stadium, Couva
Referee: Ricangel De Leca (Aruba)

==== Third-place playoff ====
25 September 2016
15:00

Jamaica	3–0	Curaçao
Senior 21'; Daley 48', 70'	Report (CONCACAF); Report (CFU)

Ato Boldon Stadium, Couva
Referee: William Anderson (Puerto Rico)

==== Final ====
25 September 2016
17:30

Haiti	5–0	Cuba
Mondestin 36' (pen.); Saint-Duc 55'; Jean Jacques 63'; Casseus 78'; Elysee 90+2'	Report (CONCACAF); Report (CFU)

Ato Boldon Stadium, Couva
Referee: Trevor Taylor (Barbados)

== Central American Zone ==
2016 CONCACAF U-17 Championship qualifying (Central American zone)

Tournament details
- Host country: Costa Rica
- Dates: 17–26 November 2016
- Teams: 6 (from 1 sub-confederation)

Final positions
- Champions: Costa Rica
- Runners-up: Honduras
- Third place: El Salvador
- Fourth place: Nicaragua

Tournament statistics
- Matches played: 10
- Goals scored: 35 (3.5 per match)
- Top scorer(s): (Costa Rica) Andrés Gómez (Costa Rica) Mario Mora (5 goals each)

The format is a single round-robin stage. Panama qualified for the CONCACAF U-17 Championship as hosts and did not enter the qualifying competition. In September 2016, it was announced that San José, Costa Rica would host the Central American qualifying tournament from 17 to 26 November 2016. Due to FIFA's suspension of the National Football Federation of Guatemala, Guatemala were excluded from the qualifying competition.

Pos	Team	Pld	W	D	L	GF	GA	GD	Pts	Qualification
1	Costa Rica (H)	4	4	0	0	16	0	+16	12	2017 CONCACAF U-17 Championship
2	Honduras	4	2	0	2	7	7	0	6	2017 CONCACAF U-17 Championship
3	El Salvador	4	2	0	2	4	6	−2	6	2017 CONCACAF U-17 Championship
4	Nicaragua	4	2	0	2	5	11	−6	6	
5	Belize	4	0	0	4	3	11	−8	0	
6	Guatemala	0	0	0	0	0	0	0	0	Excluded due to FIFA suspension

(H) Hosts
17 November 2016
17:00

El Salvador	0–2	Honduras
	Report (CONCACAF); Report (UNCAF)	Mejía 52' (pen.); Canaca 90+4'

Estadio Ernesto Rohrmoser, San José
Referee: Henry Bejarano (Costa Rica)
17 November 2016
20:00

Costa Rica	4–0	Belize
Muñoz 7'; Sequeira 46'; Mora 49', 89'	Report (CONCACAF); Report (UNCAF)

Estadio Ernesto Rohrmoser, San José
Referee: Ismael Cornejo (El Salvador)

19 November 2016
17:00

Honduras	3–1	Belize
Cardona 9'; Palacios 58'; Martinez 72'	Report (CONCACAF); Report (UNCAF)	Ramos 16' (pen.)

Estadio Ernesto Rohrmoser, San José
Referee: Jose Antonio Kellys (Panama)
19 November 2016
20:00

Costa Rica	6–0	Nicaragua
Gómez 13', 60', 73', 78'; Muñoz 32'; Mora 52'	Report (CONCACAF); Report (UNCAF)

Estadio Ernesto Rohrmoser, San José
Referee: Melvin Matamoros (Honduras)

21 November 2016
17:00

Belize	1–2	El Salvador
August 41'	Report (CONCACAF); Report (UNCAF)	Cerritos 4'; Barillas 43'

Estadio Ernesto Rohrmoser, San José
Referee: Raul Castro Zuniga (Honduras)
21 November 2016
20:00

Nicaragua	3–2	Honduras
Balladares 68'; Castillo 77' (pen.); Rodríguez 84'	Report (CONCACAF); Report (UNCAF)	Palma 39'; Palacios 90+1'

Estadio Ernesto Rohrmoser, San José
Referee: Ismael Cornejo (El Salvador)

Matchday 4 was originally on 24 November 2016, but was brought forward by a day due to the incoming Hurricane Otto.

23 November 2016
17:00

Belize	1–2	Nicaragua
August 39'	Report (CONCACAF); Report (UNCAF)	Rodríguez 52', 71'

Estadio Ernesto Rohrmoser, San José
Referee: Raul Castro Zuniga (Honduras)
23 November 2016
20:00

Costa Rica	3–0	El Salvador
Muñoz 15' (pen.); Gómez 29'; Sequeira 70'	Report (CONCACAF); Report (UNCAF)

Estadio Ernesto Rohrmoser, San José
Referee: Melvin Matamoros (Honduras)

26 November 2016
17:00

El Salvador	2–0	Nicaragua
Saravia 74'; Cerritos 90+2'	Report (CONCACAF); Report (UNCAF)

Estadio Ernesto Rohrmoser, San José
Referee: Henry Bejarano (Costa Rica)
26 November 2016
20:00

Costa Rica	3–0	Honduras
Mora 7', 51'; Cortez 83'	Report (CONCACAF); Report (UNCAF)

Estadio Ernesto Rohrmoser, San José
Referee: Jose Antonio Kellys (Panama)
