= Clásico centroamericano =

Association football rivalry

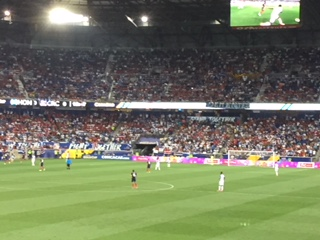
- Honduras and Costa Rica playing in the 2017 CONCACAF Gold Cup
- Other names: Derbi centroamericano
- Location: Central America (UNCAF)
- Teams: Costa Rica; Honduras
- First meeting: 4 April 1930; La Tropical; Havana, Cuba (CRC 8–0 HON)
- Latest meeting: 18 November 2025; Estadio Nacional de Costa Rica; Costa Rica (CRC 0–0 HON)

Statistics
- Total meetings: 73
- Most wins: Costa Rica (24)
- All-time series: 24–27–22 (Costa Rica)
- Largest victory: Costa Rica 8–0 Honduras (4 April 1930)

The Clásico centroamericano (Central American classic) is a rivalry between the Costa Rica national football team and the Honduras national football team. The rivalry has also presented at club level for having the most successful clubs in Central America in terms of the CONCACAF Champions League.

Costa Rica in Honduras is considered one of the most important rivals, since Costa Rica's paternity has been a clear over Honduras since the beginning of this rivalry, along with the Mexico national football team and the El Salvador national football team. Moreover, Honduras is considered in Costa Rica also as one of the most important rivals, along with the Mexico national football team and the United States men's national team. This rivalry is also accentuated by the selections that are higher amounts of account in the Copa Centroamericana trophies, most World Cup appearances and otherwise being the only teams to have achieved Aztecazo in World Cup qualifying.

These two sides are considered as the best in Central America to compete globally. The Costa Rica national team boasts the best in the area by being the only Central American national team to progress to the second round of a FIFA World Cup. This achievement has been accomplished twice, the first being at the 1990 FIFA World Cup in Italy and the 2014 FIFA World Cup in Brazil. The team has won 8 Copas Centroamericana, making Costa Rica the most successful team in the competition. Costa Rica have participated in six World Cups; 1990, 2002, 2006, 2014, 2018 and in 2022. Meanwhile the Honduras national team has never made it out of the group stage in the three World Cups the team has taken part in, España 1982, South Africa 2010, and Brazil 2014. The Honduras national team has won 4 Copas Centroamericana and one CONCACAF Gold Cup in 1981. Outside of North America the team has participated in the 2001 Copa América, the only Copa América Honduras has ever been invited to. The team won third place after knocking off Uruguay in the third place match. That year Honduras reached its highest ranking on the FIFA World Rankings at rank 20. On the other hand, while Costa Rica has managed to remain being a competitive side with a decent performance, Honduras has been marked with numerous heavy defeats in every major games, either friendlies or competitions, often by five goals up.

The rivalry can be considered very even, since the number of wins in direct clashes selections levels from the first game in 1930, has always remained relatively even (with ups and downs for both teams at different times, but always showing enough equity). The history of fighting, a total of 73 games, has 24 wins to the Costa Rica national football team, 22 wins for the Honduras national football team and 27 draws, almost bringing equity in this rivalry is demonstrated.

== Origin of rivalry ==
In recent years, these two nations have awakened a wide rivalry each time he approaches a commitment of this caliber. However, a review of the history reminds us that 'pique' comes from long ago, by elements not necessarily linked to the sport that moves masses.

The memory leads to that September 15, 1842 when he was shot in the Central Park of San Jose, Costa Rica, the great hero of the Federal Republic of Central America, Honduran Francisco Morazan, a leader who dominated the political and military scene Central and always wanted to turn the area into one nation. Even Morazán was the last president of this group. And in 1838, when Costa Rica had to face President Braulio Carrillo Colina, the Ticos broken relationship with the Central American Federation, which generates the beginning of a rivalry between the governments of Morazan and Carrillo.

This makes Morazan landing in Caldera (Costa Rica) in April 1842 with the enemies of Carrillo and give a coup. Honduras, who was head of state in Costa Rica in that year during the months of April and September, and together with its allies, intended to use the Costa Rican people as "cannon fodder" to reconstitute the Federation, but by force and keep his dream, as well recalled by the historian Alejandro Ugalde. It was then that Costa Ricans decide to "go down" to Morazan power and shoot him.

Despite that, Morazan fondly remembers being the initiator of the project "The Great Patriotic Central". But according to Ugalde, are the elements that unite Honduras and Costa Rica, according to the review given by history. Just remember in 2009 when the military carried to Costa Rica Honduras ousted President Manuel Zelaya.

== Matches ==
CRC Win	HON Win	Draw

4 April 1930 1	Costa Rica	8–0	Honduras	Havana, Cuba
EST	Madrigal; Solera; Soto			Stadium: La Tropical; Referee: Record: 0–0–1 (0:8)

3 April 1935 2	Costa Rica	6–0	Honduras	San Salvador, El Salvador
CST	Amador; Dávila; Evans			Stadium: Estadio Nacional Flor Blanca; Attendance: 20,000; Referee: Record: 0–0–2 (0:14)

7 March 1946 3	Costa Rica	5–1	Honduras	San José, Costa Rica
CST			4' Arzú	Referee: Record: 0–0–3 (1:19)

1950 4	Costa Rica	1–1	Honduras	Tegucigalpa, Honduras
CST		Report		Stadium: Estadio Tiburcio Carías Andino; Referee: Record: 0–0–3 (1:19)

13 March 1953 5	Costa Rica	4–1	Honduras	San José, Costa Rica
CST	Goñi 20'; Rodríguez 55'; Valenciano		Leaky	Stadium: Estadio Nacional; Referee: William Crawford (ENG); Record: 0–0–4 (2:23)

28 August 1955 6	Honduras	1–2	Costa Rica	Tegucigalpa, Honduras
CST	Rivera 56'		29' Monge; 37' (o.g.) Sosa	Stadium: Estadio Tiburcio Carías Andino; Referee: Reg Leafe (ENG); Record: 0–0–5 (3:25)

14 December 1959 7	Costa Rica	6–1	Honduras	San Salvador, El Salvador
CST				Referee: Record: 0–0–6 (4:31)

25 February 1960 8	Costa Rica	1–1	Honduras	Havana, Cuba
EST	Armijo 66'		18' Reyes	Stadium: La Tropical; Referee: Record: 0–1–6 (5:32)

4 September 1960 9	Honduras	2–1	Costa Rica	Tegucigalpa, Honduras
CST	Suazo 10'; Leaky 21'		46' Rodríguez	Stadium: Estadio Tiburcio Carías Andino; Attendance: 10,730; Referee: José Sundheim (COL); Record: 1–1–6 (7:33)

11 September 1960 10	Costa Rica	5–0	Honduras	San José, Costa Rica
CST	Jiménez; Ulloa; Rodríguez			Stadium: Estadio Nacional; Attendance: 40,000; Referee: José Sundheim (COL); Record: 1–1–7 (7:38)

14 January 1961 11	Costa Rica	1–0	Honduras	Guatemala City, Guatemala
CST	Rodríguez 29'			Stadium: Estadio Mateo Flores; Attendance: 23,340; Referee: Felipe Buergo (MEX); Record: 1–1–8 (7:39)

15 March 1961 12	Costa Rica	3–0	Honduras	San José, Costa Rica
CST	Ulloa 55'; Monge 66'; Gobán 89'			Stadium: Estadio Nacional; Attendance: 11,555; Referee: Juan Corado (GUA); Record: 1–1–9 (7:42)

7 April 1963 13	Costa Rica	2–1	Honduras	San Salvador, El Salvador
CST	Córdoba; Jiménez		4' Guerra	Stadium: Estadio Nacional Flor Blanca; Referee: Record: 1–1–10 (8:44)

11 July 1965 14	Honduras	1–1	Costa Rica	Tegucigalpa, Honduras
CST				Stadium: Estadio Tiburcio Carías Andino; Referee: Record: 1–2–10 (9:45)

22 December 1968 15	Honduras	1–0	Costa Rica	Tegucigalpa, Honduras
CST	Gómez 32'			Stadium: Estadio Tiburcio Carías Andino; Attendance: 8,724; Referee: Michael Wurtz (USA); Record: 2–2–10 (10:45)

29 December 1968 16	Costa Rica	1–1	Honduras	San José, Costa Rica
CST	Chavarría 40'		25' (pen.) Rosales	Stadium: Estadio Nacional; Attendance: 21,636; Referee: George Cumberpath (TRI); Record: 2–3–10 (11:46)

27 November 1971 17	Costa Rica	2–1	Honduras	Port of Spain, Trinidad and Tobago
AST			Hernández	Stadium: Queen's Park Oval; Referee: Record: 2–3–11 (12:48)

1971 18	Honduras	1–0	Costa Rica	Guatemala City, Guatemala
AST		Report		Stadium: Estadio Mateo Flores; Referee: Record: 2–3–11 (12:48)

3 December 1972 19	Honduras	2–1	Costa Rica	Tegucigalpa, Honduras
CST	Bran 32'; Gómez 57'		40' Paniagua	Stadium: Estadio Tiburcio Carías Andino; Attendance: 16,727; Referee: Alfonso González (MEX); Record: 3–3–11 (14:49)

10 December 1972 20	Costa Rica	3–3	Honduras	San José, Costa Rica
CST	Elizondo 8'; Sáenz 50'; Cárcamo 60' (pen.)		70' Urquía; 85' 90' Gómez	Stadium: Estadio Ricardo Saprissa Aymá; Attendance: 14,274; Referee: Luis Villarejo (PUR); Record: 3–4–11 (17:52)

1976 21	Costa Rica	1–1	Honduras	San José, Costa Rica
CST		Report		Stadium: Estadio Ricardo Saprissa Aymá

1976 22	Honduras	1–1	Costa Rica	Tegucigalpa, Honduras
CST		Report		Stadium: Estadio Tiburcio Carías Andino

1979 23	Honduras	1–1	Costa Rica	Tegucigalpa, Honduras
CST		Report		Stadium: Estadio Tiburcio Carías Andino

1979 24	Costa Rica	1–1	Honduras	San José, Costa Rica
CST		Report		Stadium: Estadio Ricardo Saprissa Aymá

6 March 1980 25	Honduras	1–1	Costa Rica	Tegucigalpa, Honduras
CST	Norales 26'			Stadium: Estadio Tiburcio Carías Andino; Referee: Record: 3–5–11 (18:53)

16 April 1980 26	Costa Rica	1–1	Honduras	San José, Costa Rica
CST			80' Bailey	Stadium: Estadio Nacional; Referee: Record: 3–6–11 (19:54)

1 October 1980 27	Costa Rica	2–3	Honduras	San José, Costa Rica
CST	Jiménez 78' (pen.); Mills 81'		29' Bulnes; 42' Bernárdez; 67' Bailey	Stadium: Estadio Ricardo Saprissa Aymá; Attendance: 18,263; Referee: Dino Soupliotis (CAN); Record: 4–6–11 (22:56)

16 November 1980 28	Honduras	1–1	Costa Rica	Tegucigalpa, Honduras
CST	Velásquez 73'		33' Morera	Stadium: Estadio Tiburcio Carías Andino; Attendance: 28,159; Referee: David Socha (USA); Record: 4–7–11 (23:57)

11 August 1985 29	Costa Rica	2–2	Honduras	San José, Costa Rica
CST	Solano 19'; Williams 81'		8' (pen.) Figueroa; 24' Betancourt	Stadium: Estadio Nacional; Attendance: 20,043; Referee: Edward Bellion (USA); Record: 4–8–13 (27:63)

8 September 1985 30	Honduras	3–1	Costa Rica	Tegucigalpa, Honduras
CST	Betancourt 40'; Figueroa 51' 56'		7' Guimarães	Stadium: Estadio Tiburcio Carías Andino; Attendance: 37,000; Referee: Richard Ramcharan (TRI); Record: 5–8–13 (30:64)

26 May 1991 31	Costa Rica	2–0	Honduras	San José, Costa Rica
12:00 CST	Gómez 11'; Jara 52'			Stadium: Estadio Nacional; Attendance: 15,000; Referee: Carlos Castellanos (MEX); Record: 6–8–15 (33:68)

5 July 1991 32	Costa Rica	0–2	Honduras	Los Angeles, United States
PST			37' Bennett; 79' Dolmo	Stadium: Los Angeles Memorial Coliseum; Attendance: 41,103; Referee: Arturo Angeles (USA); Record: 7–8–15 (35:68)

8 November 1992 33	Costa Rica	2–3	Honduras	San José, Costa Rica
CST	Berry 3'; Arnáez 37'		47' Dolmo; 71' Smith; 83' Obando	Stadium: Estadio Nacional; Attendance: 15,000; Referee: Rafael Rodríguez (SLV); Record: 8–8–15 (38:70)

5 December 1992 34	Honduras	2–1	Costa Rica	Tegucigalpa, Honduras
CST	Flores 13'; Obando 49'			Stadium: Estadio Tiburcio Carías Andino; Attendance: 38,000; Referee: Mike Seifert (CAN); Record: 9–8–15 (40:71)

7 March 1993 35	Honduras	2–0	Costa Rica	Tegucigalpa, Honduras
CST	Suazo 53'; Cálix 56'			Stadium: Estadio Tiburcio Carías Andino; Attendance: 11,100; Referee: Rafael Rodríguez (SLV); Record: 10–8–15 (42:71)

7 December 1995 36	Costa Rica	1–1 (2–4 p)	Honduras	San Salvador, El Salvador
CST	Fonseca 55'		60' Williams	Stadium: Estadio Nacional Flor Blanca; Attendance: 42,000; Referee: Joshua Patlak (USA); Record: 10–9–15 (43:72)

4 August 1996 37	Costa Rica	1–1	Honduras	San José, Costa Rica
CST	Delgado 54'		45' (pen.) Smith	Stadium: Estadio Nacional; Attendance: 7,000; Referee: Olger Mejías (CRC); Record: 10–10–15 (44:73)

11 August 1996 38	Honduras	0–0	Costa Rica	Tegucigalpa, Honduras
CST				Stadium: Estadio Tiburcio Carías Andino; Attendance: 15,000; Referee: Argelio Sabillón (HON); Record: 10–11–15 (44:73)

23 April 1997 39	Costa Rica	4–0	Honduras	Guatemala City, Guatemala
CST	Fonseca 5' 8' 71'; López 44'			Stadium: Estadio Mateo Flores; Attendance: 15,000; Referee: Néry Alfaro (SLV); Record: 10–11–16 (44:77)

21 January 1998 40	Costa Rica	1–4	Honduras	Nicoya, Costa Rica
CST	Arnáez 10'		9' (o.g.) Morales; 52' Carson; 68' 72' Velásquez	Stadium: Estadio Chorotega; Referee: Rodrigo Badilla (CRC); Record: 11–11–16 (48:78)

21 March 1999 41	Costa Rica	0–1	Honduras	San José, Costa Rica
CST			14' Pavón	Stadium: Estadio Nacional; Attendance: 19,105; Referee: Rafael Rodríguez (SLV); Record: 12–11–16 (49:78)

26 March 1999 42	Costa Rica	1–2	Honduras	San José, Costa Rica
CST	Fonseca 36'		10' (pen.) Clavasquín; 75' Pavón	Stadium: Estadio Nacional; Attendance: 7,000; Referee: León Padró (MEX); Record: 13–11–16 (51:79)

29 December 1999 43	Costa Rica	1–1	Honduras	Alajuela, Costa Rica
CST	Medford 71'		89' García	Stadium: Estadio Alejandro Morera Soto; Attendance: 19,000; Referee: Carlos Batres (GUA); Record: 13–12–16 (52:80)

28 February 2001 44	Costa Rica	2–2	Honduras	San José, Costa Rica
20:00 CST	Fonseca 65'; Cordero 90+2'		3' Pineda; 85' Núñez	Stadium: Estadio Ricardo Saprissa Aymá; Attendance: 20,000; Referee: Ali Bujsaim (UAE); Record: 13–13–16 (54:82)

1 July 2001 45	Honduras	2–3	Costa Rica	Tegucigalpa, Honduras
CST	Guevara 25' 38'		9' Wanchope; 13' Fonseca; 83' Solís	Stadium: Estadio Tiburcio Carías Andino; Attendance: 38,000; Referee: Óscar Ruiz (COL); Record: 13–13–17 (56:85)

13 July 2001 46	Costa Rica	1–0	Honduras	Medellín, Colombia
20:15 COT	Wanchope 63'			Stadium: Atanasio Girardot Sports Complex; Attendance: 35,000; Referee: Mario Sánchez (CHI); Record: 13–13–18 (56:86)

20 February 2003 47	Costa Rica	1–0	Honduras	Panama City, Panama
EST	Bryce 45+2'			Stadium: Estadio Rommel Fernández; Attendance: 200; Referee: Carlos Batres (GUA); Record: 13–13–19 (56:87)

18 August 2004 48	Costa Rica	2–5	Honduras	Alajuela, Costa Rica
CST	Herron 20' 36'		22' Suazo; 35' de León; 77' Guevara; 87' Guerrero; 89' Martínez	Stadium: Estadio Alejandro Morera Soto; Attendance: 14,000; Referee: Marco Rodríguez (MEX); Record: 14–13–19 (61:89)

17 November 2004 49	Honduras	0–0	Costa Rica	San Pedro Sula, Honduras
CST				Stadium: Estadio Francisco Morazán; Attendance: 18,000; Referee: Carlos Batres (GUA); Record: 14–14–19 (61:89)

27 February 2005 50	Costa Rica	1–1 (7–6 p)	Honduras	Guatemala City, Guatemala
CST	Wilson 68'		58' Núñez	Stadium: Estadio Mateo Flores; Attendance: 1,491; Referee: Carlos Batres (GUA); Record: 14–15–19 (62:90)
	Penalties
	Soto (penalty missed); Alfaro (penalty scored); Wilson (penalty scored); Cubero (penalty scored); Sequeira (penalty scored); Fonseca (penalty scored); Díaz (penalty scored); Umaña (penalty scored)		(penalty scored) Velásquez; (penalty scored) López; (penalty scored) Mendoza; (penalty missed) Berríos; (penalty scored) Núñez; (penalty scored) Guerrero; (penalty scored) Reyes; (penalty missed) Vallecillo

16 July 2005 51	Costa Rica	2–3	Honduras	Foxborough, United States
13:00 EST	Bolaños 40'; Ruiz 81'		6' Velásquez; 27' Turcios; 30' Núñez	Stadium: Gillette Stadium; Attendance: 22,108; Referee: Benito Archundia (MEX); Record: 15–15–19 (65:92)

9 February 2007 52	Costa Rica	3–1	Honduras	San Salvador, El Salvador
19:30 CST	Fonseca 4' 70'; González 46'		59' Martínez	Stadium: Estadio Cuscatlán; Referee: Benito Archundia (MEX); Record: 15–15–20 (66:95)

9 September 2007 53	Costa Rica	0–0	Honduras	East Hartford, United States
EST				Stadium: Rentschler Field; Attendance: 8,000; Referee: Terry Vaughn (USA); Record: 15–16–20 (66:95)

11 February 2009 54	Costa Rica	2–0	Honduras	San José, Costa Rica
20:30 CST	Furtado 48' 59'			Stadium: Estadio Ricardo Saprissa Aymá; Attendance: 18,000; Referee: Joel Aguilar (SLV); Record: 15–16–21 (66:97)

12 August 2009 55	Honduras	4–0	Costa Rica	San Pedro Sula, Honduras
19:30 CST	Costly 30' 90+2'; Pavón 51'; Valladares 89'			Stadium: Estadio Olímpico Metropolitano; Attendance: 30,000; Referee: Marco Rodríguez (MEX); Record: 16–16–21 (70:97)

14 January 2011 56	Costa Rica	1–1	Honduras	Panama City, Panama
19:00 EST	Núñez 42'		90+1' Núñez	Stadium: Estadio Rommel Fernández; Attendance: 6,000; Referee: Roberto García (MEX); Record: 16–17–21 (71:98)

23 January 2011 57	Costa Rica	1–2	Honduras	Panama City, Panama
18:00 EST	Ureña 73'		8' W. Martínez; 53' E. Martínez	Stadium: Estadio Rommel Fernández; Attendance: 2,000; Referee: Walter López (GUA); Record: 17–17–21 (73:99)

18 June 2011 58	Costa Rica	1–1 (2–4 p)	Honduras	East Rutherford, United States
17:00 EST	Marshall 56'		49' Bengtson	Stadium: New Meadowlands Stadium; Attendance: 78,807; Referee: Roberto Moreno (PAN); Record: 17–18–21 (74:100)
	Penalties
	Borges (penalty missed); Ruiz (penalty scored); Saborío (penalty missed); Campbell (penalty scored)		(penalty scored) Costly; (penalty scored) Bernárdez; (penalty scored) Palacios; (penalty scored) Bengtson

11 April 2012 59	Costa Rica	1–1	Honduras	San José, Costa Rica
19:00 CST	Vargas 49'		24' Suazo	Stadium: Estadio Nacional; Attendance: 6,000; Referee: Mark Geiger (USA); Record: 17–19–21 (75:101)

27 January 2013 60	Costa Rica	1–0	Honduras	San José, Costa Rica
17:00 CST	González 38'			Stadium: Estadio Nacional; Attendance: 14,146; Referee: Joel Aguilar (SLV); Record: 17–19–22 (75:102)

7 June 2013 61	Costa Rica	1–0	Honduras	San José, Costa Rica
20:10 CST	Miller 25'			Stadium: Estadio Nacional; Attendance: 35,000; Referee: Walter López (GUA); Record: 17–19–23 (75:103)

21 July 2013 62	Costa Rica	0–1	Honduras	Baltimore, United States
19:00 EST			49' Najar	Stadium: M&T Bank Stadium; Attendance: 70,540; Referee: Courtney Campbell (JAM); Record: 18–19–23 (76:103)

11 October 2013 63	Honduras	1–0	Costa Rica	San Pedro Sula, Honduras
15:00 CST	Bengtson 65'			Stadium: Estadio Olímpico Metropolitano; Attendance: 38,500; Referee: Jair Marrufo (USA); Record: 19–19–23 (77:103)

20 January 2017 64	Costa Rica	1–1	Honduras	Panama City, Panama
18:30 EST	Calvo 59'		17' Andino	Stadium: Estadio Rommel Fernández

28 March 2017 65	Honduras	1–1	Costa Rica	San Pedro Sula, Honduras
15:00 CST	Lozano 35'		68' Waston	Stadium: Estadio Francisco Morazán; Referee: Joel Aguilar (SLV)

7 July 2017 66	Costa Rica	1–0	Honduras	Harrison, United States
21:36 EST	Ureña 39'			Stadium: Red Bull Arena; Attendance: 25,817; Referee: Walter López (GUA)

7 October 2017 67	Costa Rica	1–1	Honduras	San José, Costa Rica
16:00 CST	Waston 90+5'		66' Hernández	Stadium: Estadio Nacional; Attendance: 30,000; Referee: César Ramos (MEX)

6 June 2021 68	Honduras	2–2 (5–4 p)	Costa Rica	Denver, United States
18:30 EST	E. Rodríguez 48'; Elis 80'		Campbell 8'; Calvo 85'	Stadium: Empower Field at Mile High; Attendance: 37,648; Referee: Reon Radix (Grenada); Record: 17–18–21 (74:100)
	Penalties
	A. López (penalty scored); Elis (penalty scored); Benguché (penalty scored); Toro (penalty missed); Acosta (penalty scored) } Alvarado (penalty scored)		(penalty scored) Venegas; (penalty scored) Calvo; (penalty missed) Lassiter; (penalty scored) Torres; (penalty scored) Mora; (penalty missed) Tejeda

7 October 2021 69	Honduras	0–0	Costa Rica	San Pedro Sula, Honduras
18:05 CST				Stadium: Estadio Olímpico Metropolitano; Referee: Mario Escobar (Guatemala)

16 November 2021 70	Costa Rica	2–1	Honduras	San José, Costa Rica
19:05 CST	Duarte 20'; Torres 90+5'		Quioto 35'	Stadium: Estadio Nacional

23 March 2024 71	Costa Rica	3–1	Honduras	Frisco, Texas, United States
19:15 CST	Galo 12'; Madrigal 56'; Brenes 62'		Chirinos 10'	Stadium: Toyota Stadium; Referee: Ismail Elfath (United States)

9 October 2025 72	Honduras	0–0	Costa Rica	San Pedro Sula, Honduras
21:00 CST				Stadium: Estadio General Francisco Morazán; Referee: Walter López Castellanos (Guatemala)

18 November 2025 73	Costa Rica	0–0	Honduras	San José, Costa Rica
21:00 CST				Stadium: Estadio Nacional de Costa Rica; Referee: Drew Fischer (Canada)

== Head to Head ==
- As of 18 November 2025

Pos	Team	Pld	W	D	L	GF	GA	GD
1	Costa Rica	72	24	27	22	106	84	+23
2	Honduras	72	22	27	24	84	106	–23

== Other categories ==
CRC Win	HON Win	Draw

=== Olympic teams ===
11 May 1983	Honduras	0–1	Costa Rica	Tegucigalpa, Honduras
CST			Guardia	Stadium: Estadio Tiburcio Carías Andino; Referee: Record: 4–7–12 (23:58)

18 May 1983	Costa Rica	3–2	Honduras	San José, Costa Rica
CST	Coronado; Chavarría			Referee: Record: 4–7–13 (25:61)

January 1990	Honduras	3–1	Costa Rica	Tegucigalpa, Honduras
CST				Referee: Record: 6–8–13 (33:65)

January 1990	Honduras	0–1	Costa Rica	Tegucigalpa, Honduras
CST				Referee: Record: 6–8–14 (33:66)

17 January 1994	Costa Rica	3–5	Honduras	San Salvador, El Salvador
CST

December 1997	Honduras	0–0 (3–5 p)	Costa Rica	San Pedro Sula, Honduras
CST				Stadium: Estadio Olímpico Metropolitano

6 April 2000	Costa Rica	1–1	Honduras	Guadalajara, Mexico
CST

30 November 2001	Costa Rica	1–2	Honduras	Guatemala City, Guatemala
CST	Scott 8'		21' (pen.) Figueroa; 69' Zelaya	Stadium: Estadio Mateo Flores

30 November 2002	Costa Rica	1–0	Honduras	San Salvador, El Salvador
CST

10 February 2004	Costa Rica	2–0	Honduras	Guadalajara, Mexico
CST	López 21'; Saborío 77'			Attendance: 60,000; Referee: Gilberto Alcalá (MEX)

29 July 2006	Costa Rica	1–0	Honduras	Cartagena, Colombia
EST

21 July 2007	Costa Rica	1–2	Honduras	Rio de Janeiro, Brazil
15:00 BRT	Brenes 10'		21' 34' Leverón	Stadium: Miécimo da Silva Sports Complex

23 September 2011	Honduras	2–2	Costa Rica	San Pedro Sula, Honduras
CST	Rojas 28'; Hernández 85'		51' Martínez; 83' Estrada	Stadium: Estadio Francisco Morazán; Attendance: 2,900; Referee: Jafeth Perea (PAN)

15 March 2013	Costa Rica	0–1	Honduras	San José, Costa Rica
19:00 CST			45' Róchez	Stadium: Estadio Nacional

4 October 2015	Costa Rica	0–2	Honduras	Carson, United States
13:30 PST			41' Lozano; 82' Elis	Stadium: StubHub Center; Referee: Christopher Reid (BLZ)

13 December 2017	Costa Rica	0–1	Honduras	Managua, Nicaragua
19:00 CST			62' Cruz	Stadium: Nicaragua National Football Stadium; Referee: Jaime Herrera (SLV)

24 July 2018	Costa Rica	1–2	Honduras	Barranquilla, Colombia
16:00 COT	Gómez 7'		64' Diego; 82' Martínez	Stadium: Romelio Martínez Stadium; Referee: Marco Antonio Ortiz (MEX)

=== Under 20 ===
7 March 1962	Costa Rica	1–2	Honduras	Panama City, Panama
EST

17 December 1978	Honduras	2–1	Costa Rica	Tegucigalpa, Honduras
CST				Stadium: Estadio Tiburcio Carías Andino

1 September 1982	Costa Rica	0–1	Honduras	Guatemala City, Guatemala
CST

1988	Honduras	1–2	Costa Rica
CST

1988	Costa Rica	3–1	Honduras
CST

28 August 1994	Honduras	1–0	Costa Rica	Tegucigalpa, Honduras
CST				Stadium: Estadio Tiburcio Carías Andino

13 December 2000	Costa Rica	3–0	Honduras	Panama City, Panama
EST

10 September 2002	Costa Rica	0–2	Honduras	Quetzaltenango, Guatemala
CST

13 August 2006	Honduras	2–2	Costa Rica	San Pedro Sula, Honduras
CST				Stadium: Estadio Francisco Morazán

21 September 2008	Honduras	1–2	Costa Rica	Tegucigalpa, Honduras
CST	Martínez 60'		29' Martínez; 43' Estrada	Stadium: Estadio Tiburcio Carías Andino; Attendance: 4,200; Referee: Walter López (GUA)

13 March 2009	Costa Rica	0–0 (4–2 p)	Honduras	Macoya, Tunapuna–Piarco, Trinidad and Tobago
17:00 AST				Stadium: Marvin Lee Stadium; Attendance: 4,500; Referee: Walter López (GUA)
	Penalties
	Estrada (penalty scored); Guzmán (penalty scored); Gamboa (penalty scored); Castro (penalty scored)		(penalty scored) Leverón; (penalty missed) Mejía; (penalty missed) Mayorquín; (penalty scored) Fonseca

19 July 2012	Honduras	0–0	Costa Rica	San Pedro Sula, Honduras
19:00 CST				Stadium: Estadio Francisco Morazán; Attendance: 1,500; Referee: Marlon Mejía (SLV)

19 July 2014	Costa Rica	1–1	Honduras	Santa Tecla, El Salvador
16:30 CST	Burke 20'		23' Flores	Stadium: Estadio Las Delicias; Referee: John Pitti (PAN)

1 March 2017	Costa Rica	1–2	Honduras	San José, Costa Rica
19:00 CST	Reyes 47'		49' Maldonado; 70' Grant	Stadium: Estadio Nacional; Referee: Erick Miranda (MEX)

26 August 2018	Honduras	0–4	Costa Rica	Comayagua, Honduras
18:30 CST			8' 63' Gómez; 46' Abarca; 69' Jarquín	Stadium: Estadio Carlos Miranda

13 November 2018	Costa Rica	1–1	Honduras	Bradenton, United States
18:30 EST	Gómez 47'		20' Villafranca	Stadium: IMG Academy; Referee: Ismael Cornejo (SLV)

=== Under 17 ===
22 May 1985	Costa Rica	3–1	Honduras	Mexico
CST	Medford 29'; Roses 37'; Ramírez 77'		Pineda

22 February 1987	Honduras	0–5	Costa Rica	Honduras
CST

28 February 1999	Costa Rica	3–1	Honduras	Montego Bay, Jamaica
EST

4 May 2001	Honduras	1–1	Costa Rica	San Pedro Sula, Honduras
CST				Stadium: Estadio Francisco Morazán

9 June 2005	Costa Rica	2–1	Honduras	San José, Costa Rica
CST	Quesada 25'; Borges 27'		39' García	Stadium: Estadio Ricardo Saprissa Aymá; Attendance: 1,073; Referee: Joel Aguilar (SLV)

3 July 2005	Honduras	1–1 (a.e.t.)	Costa Rica	Tegucigalpa, Honduras
CST	Oliva 84'		101' Quesada	Stadium: Estadio Tiburcio Carías Andino; Attendance: 25,000; Referee: Rubén Castellanos (GUA)

9 December 2012	Costa Rica	0–3	Honduras	San Miguel Petapa, Guatemala
CST			50' 74' 78' Elis	Stadium: Estadio Municipal de San Miguel Petapa; Attendance: 100; Referee: Óscar Reyna (GUA)

26 November 2016	Costa Rica	3–0	Honduras	San José, Costa Rica
20:00 CST	Mora 6' 51'; Cortés 83'			Stadium: Estadio Ernesto Rohrmoser
