= 2017 CONCACAF U-17 Championship squads =

Soccer tournament squads list

The squad lists for the 2017 CONCACAF U-17 Championship, the continental association football tournament for players under the age of 17.

== Group A ==
=== Panama ===
Head coach: (Panama) Juan Carlos Cubillas

No.	Pos.	Player	Date of birth (age)	Club
1	GK	Jorginho Antonio Frías Bethancourt	March 21, 2001 (aged 16)	(Panamanian Football Federation) Costa del Este
2	DF	Jorge Enrique Barría Ramos	December 7, 2000 (aged 16)	(Panamanian Football Federation) Plaza Amador
3	DF	Soyell Isiah Trejos Tesis	April 19, 2000 (aged 17)	(Panamanian Football Federation) Árabe Unido
4	DF	Humberto Alexis Harding Iribarren	March 18, 2000 (aged 17)	(Panamanian Football Federation) Costa del Este
5	MF	Edgar Daniel Cunningham Mc Kay	October 2, 2000 (aged 16)	(Panamanian Football Federation) Árabe Unido
6	MF	Ángel Antonio Pérez Atencio	May 16, 2000 (aged 16)	(Panamanian Football Federation) Sporting San Miguelito
7	MF	Ángel Gabriel Orelien González	April 2, 2001 (aged 16)	(Panamanian Football Federation) Sporting San Miguelito
8	MF	Víctor Alfredo Griffith Mullins	December 12, 2000 (aged 16)	(Panamanian Football Federation) Tauro
9	FW	Jorge Samuel Clement Gutiérrez	February 12, 2000 (aged 17)	(Panamanian Football Federation) Tauro
10	MF	Diego Ezequiel Valanta del Busto	September 8, 2000 (aged 16)	(Panamanian Football Federation) Tauro
11	MF	Eduardo Antonio Guerrero Locano	February 21, 2000 (aged 17)	(Panamanian Football Federation) Chorrillo
12	GK	Alejandro Augusto Fábrega Gerbaud	December 4, 2000 (aged 16)	(Panamanian Football Federation) Costa del Este
13	DF	Rangel Orlando Guzmán Small	June 12, 2000 (aged 16)	(Panamanian Football Federation) Tierra Firme
14	DF	Carlos Antonio Peralta Serrano	January 7, 2000 (aged 17)	(Panamanian Football Federation) Atlético Veragüense
15	MF	Alberts Aldrid Fruto Pimentel	January 2, 2001 (aged 16)	(Panamanian Football Federation) Sporting San Miguelito
16	MF	Aldair Isisdoro Cundumi Rivera	April 2, 2000 (aged 17)	(Panamanian Football Federation) Costa del Este
17	FW	Jameel Kadir Lynch Cuello	October 5, 2000 (aged 16)	(Panamanian Football Federation) Plaza Amador
18	FW	Newton Aubrey Williams Richards	January 2, 2001 (aged 16)	(Panamanian Football Federation) Costa del Este
19	FW	Rainel Alejandro Rivas Martínez	January 16, 2000 (aged 17)	(Panamanian Football Federation) Municipal San Miguelito
20	MF	Jorge Antonio Méndez Castillo	April 6, 2001 (aged 16)	(Panamanian Football Federation) Chorrillo

=== Honduras ===
Head coach: (Honduras) José Francisco Valladares

No.	Pos.	Player	Date of birth (age)	Club
1	GK	Carlos Banegas	February 9, 2001 (aged 16)	(National Autonomous Federation of Football of Honduras) Comayagua
2	DF	Osbed Perez	February 3, 2000 (aged 17)	(National Autonomous Federation of Football of Honduras) Platense
3	DF	Axel Gomez	June 28, 2000 (aged 16)	(National Autonomous Federation of Football of Honduras) Olimpia
4	DF	Cristian Moreira	May 21, 2000 (aged 16)	(National Autonomous Federation of Football of Honduras) Vida
5	DF	Alexander Bahr	February 17, 2001 (aged 16)	(United States Soccer Federation) Atlanta United FC Academy
6	MF	David Cardona	October 8, 2000 (aged 16)	(National Autonomous Federation of Football of Honduras) Real Juventud
7	MF	Gerson Chavez	January 31, 2000 (aged 17)	(National Autonomous Federation of Football of Honduras) Real España
8	MF	Everson Lopez	November 3, 2000 (aged 16)	(National Autonomous Federation of Football of Honduras) Motagua
9	FW	Patrick Palacios	January 29, 2000 (aged 17)	(National Autonomous Federation of Football of Honduras) Real España
10	MF	Joshua Canales	July 20, 2000 (aged 16)	(National Autonomous Federation of Football of Honduras) Olimpia
11	MF	Luis Palma	January 17, 2000 (aged 17)	(National Autonomous Federation of Football of Honduras) Vida
12	GK	Jordy Castro	April 10, 2000 (aged 17)	(National Autonomous Federation of Football of Honduras) Real España
13	DF	Gustavo Vallecillo	August 28, 2000 (aged 16)	(National Autonomous Federation of Football of Honduras) CARDVA
14	FW	Carlos Mejía	February 19, 2000 (aged 17)	(National Autonomous Federation of Football of Honduras) Vida
15	DF	Emilio Campos	April 18, 2000 (aged 17)	(Mexican Football Federation) U. de G.
16	MF	Bayron Varela	July 1, 2000 (aged 16)	(National Autonomous Federation of Football of Honduras) Motagua
17	DF	Cristian Contreras	September 2, 2000 (aged 16)	(National Autonomous Federation of Football of Honduras) Real España
18	MF	Santiago Cabrera	February 9, 2000 (aged 17)	(National Autonomous Federation of Football of Honduras) Honduras Progreso
19	FW	Kenneth Martinez	February 26, 2000 (aged 17)	(National Autonomous Federation of Football of Honduras) Motagua
20	MF	Cristian Madrid	January 17, 2000 (aged 17)	(National Autonomous Federation of Football of Honduras) Vida

=== Curaçao ===
Head coach: (Curaçao) Ludwig Alberto

No.	Pos.	Player	Date of birth (age)	Club
1	GK	Kevin Juliana	October 2, 2000 (aged 16)	(Curaçao Football Federation) RKSV Centro Dominguito
2	DF	Danel Rosa	June 28, 2000 (aged 16)	(Curaçao Football Federation) SV Hubentut Fortuna
3	DF	Quinton Burk	June 17, 2000 (aged 16)	(Curaçao Football Federation) Atletiko Salina
4	DF	Ayodele Kwidama	September 3, 2000 (aged 16)	(Royal Dutch Football Association) Feyenoord
5	DF	Quintin Rustveld	January 6, 2001 (aged 16)	(Royal Dutch Football Association) Feyenoord
6	MF	Roderick Bolijn	March 9, 2000 (aged 17)	(Curaçao Football Federation) Union Deportivo Banda Abou
7	MF	Angerick Dorothea	May 11, 2000 (aged 16)	(Curaçao Football Federation) RKSV Scherpenheuvel
8	MF	Jared Tyrol	May 4, 2001 (aged 15)	(Curaçao Football Federation) Atletiko Salina
9	FW	Nathan Bernadina	February 21, 2000 (aged 17)	(Royal Dutch Football Association) Spartaan'20
10	FW	Richajier Oleana	November 12, 2000 (aged 16)	(Curaçao Football Federation) RKSV Scherpenheuvel
11	FW	Roger Bazoer	December 29, 2000 (aged 16)	(Curaçao Football Federation) RKSV Scherpenheuvel
12	MF	Sharrion Pietersz	July 16, 2001 (aged 15)	(Curaçao Football Federation) Excelence School
13	MF	Luchenthly Vrutaal	May 17, 2001 (aged 15)	(Curaçao Football Federation) Union Deportivo Banda Abou
14	FW	Daveraux Cicilia	February 24, 2001 (aged 16)	(Royal Dutch Football Association) VVV-Venlo
15	DF	Brayan Albertus	February 11, 2001 (aged 16)	(Curaçao Football Federation) Excelence School
16	FW	Quincy Does	September 17, 2000 (aged 16)	(Royal Dutch Football Association) ADO Den Haag
17	MF	Ronathan Willems	September 6, 2000 (aged 16)	(Curaçao Football Federation) CSD Barber
18	MF	Shurendric Fransinet	March 12, 2000 (aged 17)	(Royal Dutch Football Association) Spartaan'20
19	DF	Alexander Suart	January 13, 2000 (aged 17)	(Curaçao Football Federation) RKV FC Sithoc
20	GK	Sellfrine Pieters	April 14, 2000 (aged 17)	(Curaçao Football Federation) RKSV Scherpenheuvel

=== Haiti ===
Head coach: (Brazil) Rafael Novaes Dias

No.	Pos.	Player	Date of birth (age)	Club
1	GK	Alan Jerome	August 22, 2000 (aged 16)	(Haitian Football Federation) Camp Nous
2	DF	Jolicoeur Junior Etienne	September 9, 2001 (aged 15)	(Haitian Football Federation) Camp Nous
3	DF	Brismax Louis Kelly Clerge	January 5, 2000 (aged 17)	(Haitian Football Federation) Camp Nous
4	DF	Djeftey Joseph	February 24, 2000 (aged 17)	(Haitian Football Federation) Camp Nous
5	MF	Anderson Belus	September 11, 2001 (aged 15)	(Haitian Football Federation) Camp Nous
6	MF	Obenson Leveille	July 21, 2000 (aged 16)	(Haitian Football Federation) Camp Nous
7	MF	Louidon Casseus	December 23, 2000 (aged 16)	(Haitian Football Federation) Camp Nous
8	MF	Serge Anthony Lucien	February 6, 2000 (aged 17)	(Haitian Football Federation) Camp Nous
9	FW	Nael Wellokfy Elysee	May 28, 2001 (aged 15)	(Haitian Football Federation) Camp Nous
10	FW	Steeve Selso Saint-Duc	January 8, 2000 (aged 17)	(Haitian Football Federation) Camp Nous
11	MF	Steeve Mondestin	July 3, 2001 (aged 15)	(Haitian Football Federation) Camp Nous
12	GK	Josué Duverger	April 27, 2000 (aged 16)	(Portuguese Football Federation) Sporting CP
13	DF	Jimmylson Guillaume	November 10, 2001 (aged 15)	(Haitian Football Federation) Camp Nous
14	FW	Marc Michael Martine	May 22, 2000 (aged 16)	(Haitian Football Federation) Camp Nous
15	DF	Talson Charleus	June 15, 2001 (aged 15)	(Haitian Football Federation) Camp Nous
16	MF	Danley Jean Jacques	May 20, 2000 (aged 16)	(Haitian Football Federation) Camp Nous
17	MF	Ivenson Basquin	February 6, 2000 (aged 17)	(Haitian Football Federation) Camp Nous
18	MF	Widny Salomon	January 3, 2000 (aged 17)	(Haitian Football Federation) Camp Nous
19	DF	Corlens Etienne	June 24, 2002 (aged 14)	(Haitian Football Federation) Camp Nous
20	MF	Valdo Etienne	May 11, 2000 (aged 16)	(Haitian Football Federation) Camp Nous

== Group B ==
=== Costa Rica ===
Head coach: (Costa Rica) Breansse Camacho

No.	Pos.	Player	Date of birth (age)	Club
1	GK	Ricardo Montenegro Hernández	July 9, 2000 (aged 16)	(Costa Rican Football Federation) Saprissa
2	DF	Andrés Fernando Hernández Betancur	January 1, 2000 (aged 17)	(Costa Rican Football Federation) Saprissa
3	DF	Fernand José Faerrón Tristán	August 22, 2000 (aged 16)	(Costa Rican Football Federation) Belén
4	DF	Karin Arce Gutiérrez	March 1, 2000 (aged 17)	(Costa Rican Football Federation) Alajuelense
5	MF	Amferny Stward Arias Sinclair	January 15, 2000 (aged 17)	(Costa Rican Football Federation) Alajuelense
6	DF	Walter Eduardo Cortés Pérez	February 5, 2000 (aged 17)	(Costa Rican Football Federation) Saprissa
7	FW	Josué Andrés Abarca Valverde	January 4, 2000 (aged 17)	(Costa Rican Football Federation) UCR
8	MF	Christian Joel Muñoz Salazar	February 8, 2000 (aged 17)	(Costa Rican Football Federation) Saprissa
9	MF	Julen Cordero González	July 3, 2001 (aged 15)	(Costa Rican Football Federation) Saprissa
10	FW	Andrés Gómez Rodríguez	May 7, 2000 (aged 16)	(Costa Rican Football Federation) Belén
11	FW	José Rodolfo Alfaro Vargas	March 18, 2000 (aged 17)	(Costa Rican Football Federation) Carmelita
12	DF	Felipe José Flores Bolaños	September 20, 2000 (aged 16)	(Costa Rican Football Federation) Alajuelense
13	MF	Jeurgen Norwin Sequeira Cruz	May 29, 2000 (aged 16)	(Costa Rican Football Federation) Belén
14	MF	Greivin David Fonseca Vargas	September 7, 2000 (aged 16)	(Costa Rican Football Federation) Saprissa
15	MF	Ronnier Bustamante	June 5, 2000 (aged 16)	(Costa Rican Football Federation) Herediano
16	MF	Yecxy Jarquin Ramos	May 22, 2000 (aged 16)	(Costa Rican Football Federation) Municipal Liberia
17	DF	Anderson Jesús Fernández Espionza	January 10, 2000 (aged 17)	(Costa Rican Football Federation) Saprissa
18	GK	Kevin José Chamorro Rodríguez	April 8, 2000 (aged 17)	(Costa Rican Football Federation) Carmelita
19	FW	Justin Montero Castro	April 1, 2000 (aged 17)	(Costa Rican Football Federation) Alajuelense
20	DF	Alexander Román Bermúdez	March 21, 2001 (aged 16)	(Costa Rican Football Federation) Alajuelense

=== Canada ===
Head coach: (Canada) Paul Stalteri

No.	Pos.	Player	Date of birth (age)	Club
1	GK	Gianluca Catalano	May 6, 2000 (aged 16)	(Canadian Soccer Association) Toronto FC III
2	DF	Jake Ruby	June 4, 2000 (aged 16)	(Canadian Soccer Association) Whitecaps FC Academy
3	MF	Terique Mohammed	January 27, 2000 (aged 17)	(Canadian Soccer Association) Toronto FC III
4	DF	Julian Dunn-Johnson	July 11, 2000 (aged 16)	(Canadian Soccer Association) Toronto FC III
5	DF	Rocco Romeo	March 25, 2000 (aged 17)	(Canadian Soccer Association) Toronto FC III
6	MF	Noble Okello	July 20, 2000 (aged 16)	(Canadian Soccer Association) Toronto FC III
7	MF	Jordan Faria	June 13, 2000 (aged 16)	(Canadian Soccer Association) Toronto FC III
8	MF	Michael Baldisimo	April 13, 2000 (aged 17)	(Canadian Soccer Association) Vancouver Whitecaps FC 2
9	FW	Jonathan David	January 14, 2000 (aged 17)	(Canadian Soccer Association) Ottawa Internationals
10	MF	Steffen Yeates	January 4, 2000 (aged 17)	(Canadian Soccer Association) Toronto FC III
11	MF	Luca Petrasso	June 16, 2000 (aged 16)	(Canadian Soccer Association) Toronto FC III
12	DF	Émile Legault	April 10, 2000 (aged 17)	(French Football Federation) Auxerre
13	MF	Alessandro Hojabrpour	January 10, 2000 (aged 17)	(Canadian Soccer Association) Whitecaps FC Academy
14	DF	Yohan Le Bourhis	March 9, 2000 (aged 17)	(Canadian Soccer Association) Montreal Impact Academy
15	MF	Ryan Amorim	April 5, 2000 (aged 17)	(Portuguese Football Federation) Vitória de Setúbal
16	MF	Benson Fazili	January 12, 2000 (aged 17)	(Canadian Soccer Association) Ottawa Internationals
17	MF	Kunle Dada-Luke	January 12, 2000 (aged 17)	(Canadian Soccer Association) Toronto FC III
18	GK	Sebastian Sgarbossa	September 8, 2000 (aged 16)	(Canadian Soccer Association) Toronto FC III
19	FW	José Hernández	March 19, 2000 (aged 17)	(Canadian Soccer Association) Whitecaps FC Academy
20	FW	Zakaria Abdi	April 23, 2000 (aged 16)	(Canadian Soccer Association) Toronto FC III

=== Cuba ===
Head coach: (Cuba) Rufino Sotolongo

No.	Pos.	Player	Date of birth (age)	Club
1	GK	Danny Echeverria Díaz	April 21, 2000 (aged 17)	(Football Association of Cuba) Villa Clara
2	DF	Cristhian Turca Pijuan	May 6, 2000 (aged 16)	(Football Association of Cuba) La Habana
3	DF	Miguel Ignacio Coll Tamayo	July 12, 2000 (aged 16)	(Football Association of Cuba) Holguín
4	DF	Roy Luis López	September 11, 2000 (aged 16)	(Football Association of Cuba) Camagüey
5	DF	Christopher Yoel Llorente Fernández (Note: Replaced Dayron López prior to tournament start.)	February 21, 2000 (aged 17)	(Football Association of Cuba) Cienfuegos
6	MF	Jhan Marcos Rodríguez Licea	July 11, 2000 (aged 16)	(Football Association of Cuba) Camagüey
7	FW	Ribaldo Roldán Moreno	April 23, 2001 (aged 15)	(Football Association of Cuba) La Habana
8	MF	Carlos Alberto Molina López	March 19, 2000 (aged 17)	(Football Association of Cuba) Matanzas
9	FW	Yandry Romero Clark	January 2, 2000 (aged 17)	(Football Association of Cuba) La Habana
10	FW	Brian Savigne Polanco	March 27, 2000 (aged 17)	(Football Association of Cuba) Santiago de Cuba
11	MF	Ronaldo Rosette García	July 14, 2000 (aged 16)	(Football Association of Cuba) La Habana
12	GK	Antuan Obregón Medina	September 20, 2000 (aged 16)	(Football Association of Cuba) Mayabueque
13	DF	Bruno Manuel Rendón Cardoso	May 7, 2000 (aged 16)	(Football Association of Cuba) Matanzas
14	MF	Carlos Elián Ibarra Molina	January 24, 2000 (aged 17)	(Football Association of Cuba) Santiago de Cuba
15	DF	Karel Espino	October 27, 2001 (aged 15)	(Football Association of Cuba) Artemisa
16	MF	Omar Pérez Ramírez	April 21, 2000 (aged 17)	(Football Association of Cuba) Villa Clara
17	DF	Pedro Paulo Piñeiro Sarduy	March 22, 2000 (aged 17)	(Football Association of Cuba) La Habana
18	MF	Josué Vega Alvares	January 27, 2000 (aged 17)	(Football Association of Cuba) La Habana
19	FW	Manuel Ignacio Cruz Ledesma	September 20, 2000 (aged 16)	(Football Association of Cuba) Camagüey
20	GK	Arturo Héctor Godoy	January 12, 2000 (aged 17)	(Football Association of Cuba) La Habana

=== Suriname ===
Head coach: (Suriname) Rogillo Kolf

No.	Pos.	Player	Date of birth (age)	Club
1	GK	Fhabrisio Saling		(Surinamese Football Association) Leo Victor
2	DF	Clarence Belong		(Surinamese Football Association) Oase
3	DF	Michiel Revales		(Surinamese Football Association) Oase
4	DF	Donovan Rellum		(Surinamese Football Association) Transvaal
5	DF	Gideon Seymonson		(Surinamese Football Association) Robinhood
6	MF	Rievaldo Doorson		(Surinamese Football Association) West United
7	MF	Brian Elshot		(Surinamese Football Association) Leo Victor
8	MF	Lorenzo Nelom		(Surinamese Football Association) Oase
9	FW	Archero Hoever		(Surinamese Football Association) Robinhood
10	MF	Jaycee Marsidin		(Surinamese Football Association) Robinhood
11	FW	Jenairo Eenig		(Surinamese Football Association) Transvaal
12	MF	Aziez Saino		(Surinamese Football Association) Oase
13	DF	Siffion Mac-Intosh		(Surinamese Football Association) Santos
14	MF	Roscello Vlijter	January 1, 2000 (aged 17)	(Royal Dutch Football Association) Feyenoord
15	MF	Jamiro Hecbert		(Surinamese Football Association) Transvaal
16	MF	Chesron Aloewel		(Surinamese Football Association) Robinhood
17	DF	Bjorn Graves		(Surinamese Football Association) Leo Victor
18	FW	Amerigo Sale		(Surinamese Football Association) Leo Victor
19	FW	Damian Brunswijk		(Surinamese Football Association) Notch
20	GK	Rivaldo Soesman		(Surinamese Football Association) West United

== Group C ==
=== Mexico ===
Head coach: (Mexico) Mario Arteaga

No.	Pos.	Player	Date of birth (age)	Club
1	GK	André Alcaráz	January 8, 2000 (aged 17)	(Mexican Football Federation) Guadalajara
2	DF	Adrián Vázquez	January 9, 2000 (aged 17)	(Mexican Football Federation) Pachuca
3	DF	Carlos Robles	July 11, 2000 (aged 16)	(Mexican Football Federation) Atlas
4	DF	Luis Olivas	February 10, 2000 (aged 17)	(Mexican Football Federation) Guadalajara
5	DF	Raúl Sandoval	January 18, 2000 (aged 17)	(Mexican Football Federation) Tijuana
6	MF	Luis Gamíz	April 4, 2000 (aged 17)	(Mexican Football Federation) Tijuana
7	FW	Jairo Torres	July 5, 2000 (aged 16)	(Mexican Football Federation) Atlas
8	MF	Alexis Gutiérrez	February 26, 2000 (aged 17)	(Mexican Football Federation) Guadalajara
9	FW	Daniel López	March 14, 2000 (aged 17)	(Mexican Football Federation) Tijuana
10	FW	Roberto de la Rosa	January 4, 2000 (aged 17)	(Mexican Football Federation) Pachuca
11	MF	Jesús Pérez	April 11, 2000 (aged 17)	(Mexican Football Federation) Querétaro
12	GK	César López	June 10, 2000 (aged 16)	(Mexican Football Federation) Guadalajara
13	DF	Haret Ortega	May 19, 2000 (aged 16)	(Mexican Football Federation) América
14	DF	Alan Maeda	February 5, 2000 (aged 17)	(Mexican Football Federation) Santos Laguna
15	DF	Andrés Catalán	August 20, 2000 (aged 16)	(Mexican Football Federation) Monarcas Morelia
16	MF	Marco Ruiz	March 14, 2000 (aged 17)	(Mexican Football Federation) Atlas
17	MF	Carlos Guerrero	February 14, 2000 (aged 17)	(Mexican Football Federation) León
18	MF	Víctor Reyes	January 17, 2000 (aged 17)	(Mexican Football Federation) Monarcas Morelia
19	FW	César Huerta	December 3, 2000 (aged 16)	(Mexican Football Federation) Guadalajara
20	FW	Alfonso Alvarado	March 13, 2000 (aged 17)	(Mexican Football Federation) Monterrey

=== El Salvador ===
Head coach: (El Salvador) Erick Dowson Prado

No.	Pos.	Player	Date of birth (age)	Club
1	GK	Jairo Alexander Guardado Abrego	May 24, 2000 (aged 16)	(Salvadoran Football Federation) Santa Tecla
2	DF	Kevin Alexander Menjívar Henríquez	September 23, 2000 (aged 16)	(Salvadoran Football Federation) Turín FESA
3	DF	Erick Guzmán	November 17, 2000 (aged 16)	(Salvadoran Football Federation) FAS
4	DF	Diego Alejandro Chávez García	March 2, 2000 (aged 17)	(Salvadoran Football Federation) Turín FESA
5	DF	Giovanni Ernesto Ávila	March 21, 2000 (aged 17)	(Salvadoran Football Federation) Santa Tecla
6	MF	Éver Hernán Guzmán Quintanilla	June 25, 2000 (aged 16)	(Salvadoran Football Federation) Santa Tecla
7	FW	Fernando José Villalta Hernández	May 1, 2000 (aged 16)	Unattached
8	MF	Jorge Antonio Cruz Cortez	January 24, 2000 (aged 17)	(Salvadoran Football Federation) Once Municipal
9	FW	Alexis Cerritos	October 2, 2000 (aged 16)	(United States Soccer Federation) D.C. United Academy
10	MF	Denis José García Cornejo	January 5, 2000 (aged 17)	(Salvadoran Football Federation) Turín FESA
11	MF	Rolando Ernesto Ramírez Rodríguez	March 24, 2000 (aged 17)	(Salvadoran Football Federation) FAS
12	MF	Rodrigo Armando Sánchez	February 9, 2000 (aged 17)	(Canadian Soccer Association) Regina
13	MF	Roberto Carlos López	January 24, 2000 (aged 17)	(Salvadoran Football Federation) FAS
14	MF	Cristian Barillas Salgado	February 13, 2000 (aged 17)	(United States Soccer Federation) Pateadores
15	MF	Andy Joao Escobar	April 10, 2000 (aged 17)	(Salvadoran Football Federation) Turín FESA
16	MF	Alex Zambrano	September 22, 2000 (aged 16)	(United States Soccer Federation) D.C. United Academy
17	MF	Mauricio Armando Gómez Guzmán	August 11, 2000 (aged 16)	(Salvadoran Football Federation) Turín FESA
18	GK	Tomás Romero	December 19, 2000 (aged 16)	(United States Soccer Federation) Philadelphia Union Academy
19	DF	Sergio Enrique Ramírez Rivera	January 3, 2000 (aged 17)	Unattached
20	DF	Diego Enrique Molina	January 26, 2000 (aged 17)	(Salvadoran Football Federation) Santa Tecla

=== Jamaica ===
Head coach: (Jamaica) Andrew Edwards

No.	Pos.	Player	Date of birth (age)	Club
1	GK	Daniel Russell	January 10, 2001 (aged 16)	(Jamaica Football Federation) Manchester High
2	DF	Kendall Edwards	February 18, 2001 (aged 16)	(United States Soccer Federation) Parkview High
3	DF	Damani Osei	October 21, 2000 (aged 16)	(United States Soccer Federation) Cosby High School
4	MF	Jeremy Verley	August 9, 2000 (aged 16)	(United States Soccer Federation) Milton Academy
5	DF	Jamoi Topey	January 13, 2000 (aged 17)	(Jamaica Football Federation) Camperdown High
6	DF	Akeem Mullings	January 31, 2000 (aged 17)	(Jamaica Football Federation) Vauxhall High School
7	MF	Kaheem Parris	January 6, 2000 (aged 17)	(Jamaica Football Federation) Dinthill Technical
8	MF	Coby Atkinson	May 21, 2000 (aged 16)	(United States Soccer Federation) American Heritage
9	FW	Raewin Senior	July 1, 2000 (aged 16)	(Jamaica Football Federation) Excelsior High
10	MF	Renato Campbell	March 16, 2000 (aged 17)	(Jamaica Football Federation) Kingston College
11	MF	Jermaine Lyons	April 23, 2000 (aged 16)	(Jamaica Football Federation) Denham Town High
12	DF	Kimani Gibbons	May 29, 2000 (aged 16)	(Jamaica Football Federation) St Jago High
13	GK	Tajay Griffiths	April 18, 2000 (aged 17)	(Jamaica Football Federation) Wolmers Boys
14	FW	Nicque Daley	October 19, 2000 (aged 16)	(Jamaica Football Federation) Clarendon College
15	DF	Richard Thompson	February 10, 2000 (aged 17)	(Jamaica Football Federation) Herbert Technical
16	MF	Blake White	January 1, 2000 (aged 17)	Unattached
17	DF	Casseam Priestley	December 2, 2000 (aged 16)	(Jamaica Football Federation) Kingston College
18	FW	Ricardo McIntosh	November 16, 2000 (aged 16)	(Jamaica Football Federation) Clarendon College
19	DF	Calwayne Allen	April 1, 2000 (aged 17)	(Jamaica Football Federation) St James High
20	DF	Shane Ricketts	November 28, 2000 (aged 16)	(Jamaica Football Federation) Little London High

=== United States ===
Head coach: (United States) John Hackworth

No.	Pos.	Player	Date of birth (age)	Club
12	GK	CJ Dos Santos	August 24, 2000 (aged 16)	(Portuguese Football Federation) Benfica
1	GK	Justin Garces	August 23, 2000 (aged 16)	(United States Soccer Federation) Kendall Soccer Coalition
3	DF	Chris Gloster	July 28, 2000 (aged 16)	(United States Soccer Federation) New York Red Bulls II
2	DF	Jaylin Lindsey	March 27, 2000 (aged 17)	(United States Soccer Federation) Swope Park Rangers
4	DF	James Sands	July 6, 2000 (aged 16)	(United States Soccer Federation) New York City FC Academy
5	DF	AJ Vasquez	January 8, 2000 (aged 17)	(United States Soccer Federation) FC Golden State
13	DF	Akil Watts	February 4, 2000 (aged 17)	(United States Soccer Federation) IMG Academy
10	MF	George Acosta	January 9, 2000 (aged 17)	(United States Soccer Federation) Weston FC
16	MF	Taylor Booth	May 31, 2001 (aged 15)	(United States Soccer Federation) RSL-AZ Academy
6	MF	Chris Durkin	February 8, 2000 (aged 17)	(United States Soccer Federation) D.C. United
8	MF	Blaine Ferri	September 29, 2000 (aged 16)	(United States Soccer Federation) Solar Chelsea
14	MF	Chris Goslin	May 12, 2000 (aged 16)	(United States Soccer Federation) Atlanta United FC
18	MF	Indiana Vassilev	February 16, 2001 (aged 16)	(United States Soccer Federation) IMG Academy
20	MF	Adrian Villegas	May 19, 2000 (aged 16)	(United States Soccer Federation) Portland Timbers Academy
11	FW	Andrew Carleton	June 22, 2000 (aged 16)	(United States Soccer Federation) Atlanta United FC
15	FW	Zyen Jones	August 25, 2000 (aged 16)	(United States Soccer Federation) Atlanta United FC
7	FW	Ayo Akinola	January 20, 2000 (aged 17)	(Canadian Soccer Association) Toronto FC II
17	FW	Bryan Reynolds	June 28, 2001 (aged 15)	(United States Soccer Federation) FC Dallas
9	FW	Josh Sargent	February 20, 2000 (aged 17)	(United States Soccer Federation) St. Louis Scott Gallagher
19	FW	Timothy Weah	February 22, 2000 (aged 17)	(French Football Federation) Paris Saint-Germain
