= Jesús Pérez (footballer, born 2000) =

Mexican footballer

Personal information
- Full name: Jesús Andrés Pérez Álvarez
- Date of birth: 11 April 2000 (age 26)
- Place of birth: Ensenada, Baja California, Mexico
- Height: 1.64 m (5 ft 5 in)
- Position: Midfielder

Team information
- Current team: Inter Playa
- Number: 7

Youth career
- América

Senior career*
Years	Team	Apps	(Gls)
2018	Querétaro Premier	2	(0)
2018–2020	Querétaro	0	(0)
2019–2020	→ Sonora (loan)	9	(1)
2021	Tlaxcala	2	(0)
2023–2024	Inter Playa	28	(5)
2024	Racing de Veracruz	11	(2)
2025–	Inter Playa	2	(0)

International career^{‡}
2016–2017	Mexico U17	9	(0)
Medal record
Men's football
Representing Mexico
CONCACAF Under-17 Championship
First place	2017 Panama	Team
- * Club domestic league appearances and goals as of 28 July 2021 ‡ National team caps and goals as of 11 April 2020

Jesús Andrés Pérez Álvarez (born 11 April 2000) is a Mexican professional footballer who plays as a midfielder for Sonora, on loan from Querétaro.

== Career statistics ==
=== Club ===
As of 11 April 2020

Club	Season	League			Cup		Continental		Other		Total	
Club	Season	Division	Apps	Goals	Apps	Goals	Apps	Goals	Apps	Goals	Apps	Goals
Querétaro Premier	2017–18	Liga Premier - Serie A	2	0	–		–		0	0	2	0
Querétaro	2018–19	Liga MX	0	0	5 (Note: Appearances in the Copa MX)	0	–		0	0	5	0
Querétaro	2019–20	Liga MX	0	0	0	0	–		0	0	0	0
Querétaro	Total		0	0	5	0	0	0	0	0	5	0
Cimarrones de Sonora (loan)	2019–20	Ascenso MX	9	1	4	0	–		0	0	13	1
Cimarrones de Sonora Premier (loan)	2019–20	Liga Premier - Serie A	1	0	–		–		0	0	1	0
Career total			12	1	9	0	0	0	0	0	21	1

== Honours ==
Mexico U17

- CONCACAF U-17 Championship: 2017
