= Carlos Guerrero (footballer) =

Mexican footballer (born 2000)

Personal information
- Full name: Carlos Eduardo Guerrero Zavala
- Date of birth: 14 February 2000 (age 26)
- Place of birth: León, Guanajuato, Mexico
- Height: 1.66 m (5 ft 5 in)
- Position: Midfielder

Youth career
- 2012–2015: Club América
- 2016: Real Leonés
- 2016–2019: Leon

Senior career*
Years	Team	Apps	(Gls)
2018–2020	Leon	9	(0)
2019–2020	→ Celaya (loan)	3	(0)
2020–2021	Pachuca	0	(0)
2021–2025	Oaxaca	32	(3)
2022	→ Oaxaca Premier (loan)	9	(2)

International career
2016–2017	Mexico U17	13	(0)
Medal record
Men's football
Representing Mexico
CONCACAF Under-17 Championship
First place	2017 Panama	Team
- * Club domestic league appearances and goals as of 20 April 2024

Carlos Eduardo Guerrero Zavala (born 14 February 2000) is a Mexican professional footballer who plays as a midfielder for Oaxaca.

== Honours ==
Mexico U17

- CONCACAF U-17 Championship: 2017
