= Andrés Catalán =

Mexican footballer (born 2000)

Personal information
- Full name: Andrés Didyer Catalán Guemes
- Date of birth: 20 August 2000 (age 26)
- Place of birth: Cuernavaca, Morelos, Mexico
- Height: 1.66 m (5 ft 5 in)
- Position: Defender

Team information
- Current team: Correcaminos
- Number: 19

Youth career
- 2012–2019: Morelia

Senior career*
Years	Team	Apps	(Gls)
2019–2020	Morelia	3	(0)
2020	Mazatlán	0	(0)
2021–2022	Celaya	35	(0)
2023–2025	Venados	42	(2)
2026–	Correcaminos	0	(0)

International career
2017	Mexico U17	2	(0)
Medal record
Men's football
Representing Mexico
CONCACAF Under-17 Championship
First place	2017 Panama	Team
- * Club domestic league appearances and goals as of 18:48, 5 June 2024 (UTC)

Andrés Didyer Catalán Guemes (born 20 August 2000) is a Mexican professional footballer who plays as a defender for Liga de Expansión MX club Correcaminos.

== Career statistics ==
=== Club ===
As of 10 April 2020

Club	Season	League			Cup		Continental		Other		Total	
Club	Season	Division	Apps	Goals	Apps	Goals	Apps	Goals	Apps	Goals	Apps	Goals
Morelia	2018–19	Liga MX	3	0	3	0	–		–		6	0
Morelia	2019–20	Liga MX	–		1	0	–		–		1	0
Career total			3	0	4	0	0	0	0	0	7	0

== Honours ==
Mexico U17

- CONCACAF U-17 Championship: 2017
