= André Alcaráz =

Mexican footballer (born 2000)

Personal information
- Full name: Víctor André Alcaráz Díaz
- Date of birth: 8 January 2000 (age 26)
- Place of birth: Languedoc-Roussillon, France
- Height: 1.85 m (6 ft 1 in)
- Position: Goalkeeper

Team information
- Current team: FC Santa Coloma
- Number: 12

Youth career
- –2020: Guadalajara

Senior career*
| Years | Team | Apps | (Gls) |
| 2020–2022 | Guadalajara | 0 | (0) |
| 2020–2021 | → Tapatío (loan) | 1 | (0) |
| 2021–2022 | → Alebrijes de Oaxaca (loan) | 31 | (0) |
| 2022–2024 | Tapatío | 13 | (0) |
| 2023 | → Venados (loan) | 16 | (0) |
| 2024–2025 | FC Rànger's | 31 | (0) |
| 2025–2026 | Mazatlán | 0 | (0) |
| 2026– | FC Santa Coloma | 0 | (0) |

International career
| 2016–2017 | Mexico U17 | 1 | (0) |
Medal record
Men's football
Representing Mexico
CONCACAF Under-17 Championship
| First place | 2017 Panama | Team |
- * Club domestic league appearances and goals as of 10 June 2025

Víctor André Alcaráz Díaz (born 8 January 2000) is a professional footballer who plays as a goalkeeper for Primera Divisió club FC Santa Coloma. Born in France, he was a Mexico youth international.

== Youth career ==
Alcaráz started playing football at the age of four. As a youth player, Alcaráz joined the youth academy of Mexican side Chivas, progressing from the Under-13 team to the Under-15, Under-17, and Under-20 teams.

== Club career ==
In 2021, Alcaráz was sent on loan to Mexican second-tier side Alebrijes de Oaxaca, where he was regarded as one of the club's most important players and one of the best goalkeepers in the league. In 2022, he was sent on loan to Mexican side Tapatío. In March 2024, he joined Andorran side FC Rànger's making his debut in a 3–1 win over Santa Coloma B.

== International career ==
Alcaráz is eligible to represent France internationally, having been born there due to his parents studying in the country.

== Style of play ==
Alcaráz is known for his confidence and one-on-one ability.

== Personal life ==
Alcaráz has a brother and is the son of Víctor Alcaráz González and Leticia Adriana Díaz Nájera. He regards Germany international Marc-André ter Stegen as his football idol.
