= Steeve Saint-Duc =

Haitian footballer (born 2000)

Selso
Personal information
- Full name: Steeve Selso Saint-Duc
- Date of birth: January 8, 2000 (age 26)
- Place of birth: Les Cayes, Haiti
- Height: 1.72 m (5 ft 8 in)
- Position: Forward

Youth career
- Camp Nous
- Pérolas Negras

Senior career*
Years	Team	Apps	(Gls)
2018	Los Angeles FC	0	(0)
2018	→ Strømmen (loan)	0	(0)
2019	Lansing Ignite	19	(1)
2020–2021	AEP Kozani	6	(0)

International career
2017	Haiti U17		
2018–	Haiti U20		
- * Club domestic league appearances and goals as of 18 August 2022

Steeve Selso Saint-Duc (born 8 January 2000), commonly known as Selso, is a Haitian footballer.

== Club career ==
Saint-Duc started his career from Camp Nous and in 2018 he signed for Los Angeles FC, but he was soon loaned out to Norwegian Strømmen IF. At the end of the season, Los Angeles FC declined a contract option. Saint-Duc made his professional debut on 30 March 2019 for Lansing Ignite against the Richmond Kickers in the USL League One.

== Honours ==
=== International ===
Haiti U17

- CFU Men's U-17 Tournament: 2016

=== Individual ===
- CFU Men's U-17 Tournament Golden Ball: 2016
- CFU Men's U-17 Tournament Golden Boot: 2016
- CFU Men's U-17 Tournament Best XI: 2016
