= Jairo Torres =

Mexican footballer (born 2000)

Personal information
- Full name: Ían Jairo Misael Torres Ramírez
- Date of birth: 5 July 2000 (age 26)
- Place of birth: Guadalajara, Jalisco, Mexico
- Height: 1.70 m (5 ft 7 in)
- Position: Winger

Team information
- Current team: Juárez
- Number: 10

Youth career
- 2011–2017: Atlas

Senior career*
Years	Team	Apps	(Gls)
2016–2022	Atlas	106	(9)
2022–2023	Chicago Fire	36	(0)
2024–	Juárez	65	(7)

International career^{‡}
2015	Mexico U15	4	(2)
2017	Mexico U17	10	(3)
2019–2021	Mexico U23	7	(1)
2019	Mexico	1	(0)
Medal record
Men's football
Representing Mexico
Toulon Tournament
Third place	2019 France	Team
CONCACAF Under-17 Championship
First place	2017 Panama	Team
- * Club domestic league appearances and goals as of 20 November 2026 ‡ National team caps and goals as of 8 June 2021

Ían Jairo Misael Torres Ramírez (born 5 July 2000) is a Mexican professional footballer who plays as a winger for Liga MX club Juárez.

== Club career ==
=== Youth ===
Torres joined Atlas youth academy in 2011. Which he then continued through Los Rojinegros Youth Academy successfully going through U-13, U-15, U-17 and U-20. He finally broke thorough to the first team, José Guadalupe Cruz being the coach promoting Torres to the first team.

=== Senior ===
On November 19, 2016, Torres made his professional debut for Atlas in the Liga MX against Chiapas subbing in at the 45th minute ending in a 1–0 loss.

On February 19, 2022, Torres signed a contract with Chicago Fire that will run through 2025, effective May 1, 2022.

== International career ==
=== Youth ===
On 7 May 2017, Torres won the 2017 CONCACAF U-17 Championship with the under-17 squad. He was named the best player of the tournament.

In May 2019, Torres was called up by Jaime Lozano to participate in that year's Toulon Tournament, where Mexico finished third in the tournament.

=== Senior ===
On 2 October 2019, Torres made his senior national team debut in a friendly match against Trinidad & Tobago, coming in as a substitute for Jesús Ricardo Angulo at half-time.

== Career statistics ==
=== Club ===
As of match played on 20 November 2026

Club	Season	League			Cup (Note: Includes Copa MX and U.S. Open Cup)		Continental		Other		Total	
Club	Season	Division	Apps	Goals	Apps	Goals	Apps	Goals	Apps	Goals	Apps	Goals
Atlas	2016–17	Liga MX	1	0	—		—		—		1	0
Atlas	2017–18	Liga MX	2	0	—		—		—		2	0
Atlas	2018–19	Liga MX	18	2	8	0	—		—		26	2
Atlas	2019–20	Liga MX	20	0	4	0	—		—		24	0
Atlas	2020–21	Liga MX	27	4	—		—		3 (Note: Appearances in Copa GNP por México)	0	30	4
Atlas	2021–22	Liga MX	38	3	—		—		—		38	3
Atlas	Total		106	9	12	0	—		3	0	121	9
Chicago Fire	2022	MLS	14	0	—		—		—		14	0
Chicago Fire	2023	MLS	22	0	2	0	—		3 (Note: Appearances in Leagues Cup)	0	27	0
Chicago Fire	Total		36	0	2	0	—		3	0	41	0
Juárez	2023–24	Liga MX	5	0	—		—		—		5	0
Juárez	2024–25	Liga MX	31	3	—		—		3	0	34	3
Juárez	2025–26	Liga MX	18	4	—		—		2	0	20	4
Juárez	2026–27	Liga MX	11	0	—		—		3	0	14	0
Juárez	Total		65	7	—		—		8	0	73	7
Career total			207	16	14	0	0	0	14	0	235	16

=== International ===
National team	Year	Apps	Goals
Mexico	2019	1	0
Total		1	0

== Honours ==
Atlas

- Liga MX: Apertura 2021

Mexico U17

- CONCACAF U-17 Championship: 2017

Individual

- CONCACAF U-17 Championship Golden Ball: 2017
- CONCACAF U-17 Championship Best XI: 2017
