= Raúl Sandoval (footballer) =

Mexican footballer (born 2000)

Personal information
- Full name: Raúl Martín Sandoval Zavala
- Date of birth: 18 January 2000 (age 26)
- Place of birth: Ahome, Sinaloa, Mexico
- Height: 1.76 m (5 ft 9 in)
- Position: Defender

Team information
- Current team: Atlético Morelia
- Number: 16

Youth career
- 2015–2018: Tijuana

Senior career*
Years	Team	Apps	(Gls)
2018–2019	Tijuana	0	(0)
2018–2019	→ Sinaloa (loan)	34	(1)
2020–2025	Necaxa	40	(0)
2022–2023	→ Mazatlán (loan)	22	(0)
2023–2024	→ Querétaro (loan)	32	(2)
2025–2026	Irapuato	32	(2)
2026–	Atlético Morelia	15	(1)

International career
2016–2017	Mexico U17	9	(0)
Medal record
Men's football
Representing Mexico
CONCACAF Under-17 Championship
First place	2017 Panama	Team
- * Club domestic league appearances and goals as of 21 September 2026

Raúl Martín Sandoval Zavala (born 18 January 2000) is a Mexican professional footballer who plays as a defender for Liga de Expansión MX club Atlético Morelia.
