= Daniel López (footballer, born 2000) =

Mexican footballer

Personal information
- Full name: Daniel Guadalupe López Valdez
- Date of birth: 14 March 2000 (age 26)
- Place of birth: Ahome, Sinaloa, Mexico
- Height: 1.79 m (5 ft 10 in)
- Position: Striker

Team information
- Current team: Jaiba Brava
- Number: 19

Youth career
- 2012–2013: Monterrey
- 2014–2017: Tijuana

Senior career*
Years	Team	Apps	(Gls)
2017–2023	Tijuana	6	(1)
2020–2021	→ Sinaloa (loan)	16	(3)
2022–2023	→ Atlante (loan)	32	(2)
2023–2024	Sinaloa	44	(19)
2025	Querétaro	2	(0)
2025–2026	Sporting San José	12	(2)
2026–	Jaiba Brava	6	(1)

International career
2017	Mexico U17	10	(6)
2018–2019	Mexico U20	9	(7)
Medal record
Men's football
Representing Mexico
CONCACAF Under-17 Championship
First place	2017 Panama	Team
- * Club domestic league appearances and goals as of 16 September 2026

Daniel Guadalupe López Valdez (born 14 March 2000) is a Mexican professional footballer who plays as a striker for Liga de Expansión MX club Jaiba Brava.

== International career ==
In April 2019, López was included in the 21-player squad to represent Mexico at the U-20 World Cup in Poland.

== Career statistics ==
=== Club ===
As of match played 5 December 2022

Club	Season	League			Cup		Continental		Other		Total	
Club	Season	Division	Apps	Goals	Apps	Goals	Apps	Goals	Apps	Goals	Apps	Goals
Tijuana	2017–18	Liga MX	1	0	—		—		—		1	0
Tijuana	2018–19	Liga MX	5	1	10	1	—		—		15	2
Tijuana	Total		6	1	10	1	0	0	0	0	16	2
Sinaloa (loan)	2020–21	Liga de Expansión MX	16	3	—		—		—		16	3
Atlante (loan)	2022–23	Liga de Expansión MX	11	0	—		—		—		11	0
Career total			33	4	10	1	0	0	0	0	43	5

== Honours ==
Atlante

- Liga de Expansión MX: Apertura 2022

Mexico U17

- CONCACAF U-17 Championship: 2017

Individual

- CONCACAF U-17 Championship Best XI: 2017
