= Carlos Robles (footballer, born 2000) =

Mexican footballer (born 2000)

Personal information
- Full name: Carlos Alejandro Robles Jiménez
- Date of birth: 11 July 2000 (age 26)
- Place of birth: Tepic, Nayarit, Mexico
- Height: 1.80 m (5 ft 11 in)
- Position: Centre-back

Team information
- Current team: Atlético La Paz (on loan from Atlas)
- Number: 21

Youth career
- 2012–2020: Atlas

Senior career*
Years	Team	Apps	(Gls)
2017–	Atlas	19	(2)
2020–2022	→ Tampico Madero (loan)	54	(3)
2026–	→ Atlético La Paz (loan)	0	(0)

International career
2017	Mexico U17	4	(0)
Medal record
Men's football
Representing Mexico
CONCACAF Under-17 Championship
First place	2017 Panama	Team
- * Club domestic league appearances and goals as of 15 July 2023

Carlos Alejandro Robles Jiménez (born 11 July 2000) is a Mexican professional footballer who plays as a defender for Liga de Expansión MX club Atlético La Paz, on loan from Liga MX club Atlas.

== Honours ==
Tampico Madero

- Liga de Expansión MX: Guardianes 2020

Mexico U17

- CONCACAF U-17 Championship: 2017
