= Jordan Farquharson =

Bahamian association football player

Personal information
- Full name: Jordan Patrick McKay Farquharson
- Date of birth: 21 February 2000 (age 26)
- Place of birth: Bahamas
- Position: Left midfielder

Team information
- Current team: Western Warriors SC

Youth career
- 2013–2017: Western Warriors SC

Senior career*
Years	Team	Apps	(Gls)
2017–	Western Warriors SC		

International career^{‡}
2018–	Bahamas	1	(0)
- * Club domestic league appearances and goals as of 12 January 2019 ‡ National team caps and goals as of 12 January 2019

Jordan Patrick McKay Farquharson (born 21 February 2000) is a Bahamian footballer who plays for Western Warriors SC and the Bahamas national football team.

== Club career ==
In July 2015, Farquharson went to Scotland to spend two weeks training with Dundee United.

== International career ==
In July 2016, Farquharson scored the lone goal for Bahamas U17s in a 2–1 defeat to Suriname U17s in U17 World Cup Qualifying. In May 2018, Farquharson was named in the 40-man training squad for the Bahamas' CONCACAF Nations League qualifying campaign. Farquharson made his senior international debut on 7 September 2018 in a 4–0 away defeat to Belize during CONCACAF Nations League qualifying.
