= Kevin Duarte =

Argentine footballer

Personal information
- Full name: Kevin Ismael Duarte
- Date of birth: 5 September 2001 (age 25)
- Place of birth: Lanús, Argentina
- Position: Midfielder

Team information
- Current team: Ferro Carril Oeste (on loan from Boca Juniors)

Youth career
- Boca Juniors

Senior career*
Years	Team	Apps	(Gls)
2021–	Boca Juniors	1	(0)
2022–	→ Ferro Carril Oeste (loan)	4	(0)
- * Club domestic league appearances and goals as of 19:06, 17 July 2022 (UTC)

Kevin Ismael Duarte (born 5 September 2001) is an Argentine footballer currently playing as a midfielder for Ferro Carril Oeste, on loan from Boca Juniors.

== Career statistics ==
=== Club ===
As of 18 August 2021.

Club	Season	League			Cup		Continental		Other		Total	
Club	Season	Division	Apps	Goals	Apps	Goals	Apps	Goals	Apps	Goals	Apps	Goals
Boca Juniors	2021	Argentine Primera División	1	0	0	0	0	0	0	0	1	0
Career total			1	0	0	0	0	0	0	0	1	0
