= Rahzir Jones =

Bermudan footballer

Personal information
- Full name: Rahzir Smith-Jones
- Date of birth: 1 November 2000 (age 26)
- Place of birth: Hamilton, Bermuda
- Position: Midfielder

Team information
- Current team: Welwyn Garden City

Youth career
- –2019: Queens Park Rangers

Senior career*
Years	Team	Apps	(Gls)
2019–	Welwyn Garden City		

International career^{‡}
- Bermuda U17
2018	Bermuda U20	3	(0)
2019–	Bermuda	2	(0)
- * Club domestic league appearances and goals as of 15:44, 6 June 2020 (UTC) ‡ National team caps and goals as of 15:44, 6 June 2020 (UTC)

Rahzir Smith-Jones (born 1 November 2000) is a Bermudan footballer who currently plays as a midfielder for Welwyn Garden City.

== Career statistics ==
=== International ===
As of matches played 6 June 2020.

National team	Year	Apps	Goals
Bermuda	2019	2	0
Bermuda	2020	0	0
Total		2	0
