= 2017 CONCACAF U-17 Championship =

Association football tournament for under-17 national teams

Premundial CONCACAF Sub-17 2017 (in Spanish)

Tournament details
- Host country: Panama
- Dates: 21 April – 7 May
- Teams: 12 (from 1 confederation)
- Venue(s): 2 (in 1 host city)

Final positions
- Champions: Mexico (7th title)
- Runners-up: United States

Tournament statistics
- Matches played: 25
- Goals scored: 93 (3.72 per match)
- Top scorer(s): (Honduras) Carlos Mejía (7 goals)
- Best player(s): (Mexico) Jairo Torres
- Best goalkeeper: (United States) Justin Garces
- Fair play award: Mexico

The 2017 CONCACAF Under-17 Championship was the 5th edition of the CONCACAF Under-17 Championship (18th edition if all eras included), the men's under-17 international football tournament organized by CONCACAF. It was hosted in Panama between 21 April and 7 May 2017.

The competition was used to determine the four CONCACAF representatives at the 2017 FIFA U-17 World Cup in India.

== Qualified teams ==
The qualifying competition for the tournament began in July 2016.

Team	Qualification	Appearances	Previous best performances	FIFA U-17 World Cup Participations
North American zone
Mexico (TH)	Automatic	16th	Champions (**1985**, 1987, 1991, 1996, 2013, 2015)	12
United States	Automatic	17th	Champions (1983, 1992, 2011)	15
Canada	Automatic	16th	Runners-up (2011)	6
Central American zone qualified through the Central America qualifying
Panama	Host	8th	Runners-up (**2013**)	2
Costa Rica	First place	16th	Champions (1994)	9
Honduras	Second place	17th	Runners-up (**2015**)	4
El Salvador	Third place	14th	Final round play-off (**1999**)	0
Caribbean zone qualified through the Caribbean qualifying
Haiti	Group A winner	7th	Final round group winner (2007)	1
Jamaica	Group A runner-up	13th	Final round group winner (1999)	2
Cuba	Group B winner	10th	Champions (**1988**)	2
Curaçao	Group B runner-up	6th	First round	0
Suriname	Best third place	1st	—	0

Note: no titles or runners-up between 1999 and 2007.
All previous appearances of Curaçao as the former Netherlands Antilles.
Bold indicates that the corresponding team was hosting the event.

== Venues ==
2017 CONCACAF U-17 Championship is located in Panama	Panama City	
2017 CONCACAF U-17 Championship is located in Panama	Estadio Rommel Fernández	Estadio Maracaná
2017 CONCACAF U-17 Championship is located in Panama	Capacity: 32,000	Capacity: 5,500

== Draw ==
The draw took place on December 13, 2016 at 19:00 EST (UTC−5) at Sheraton Grand Panama, Panama City, Panama, and was streamed live via CONCACAF.com.

Different from previous tournaments, the 12 teams were drawn into three groups of four teams in the group stage. Panama, Mexico and Costa Rica were seeded into each of the three groups.

- Panama, as hosts, were seeded in position A1.
- Costa Rica, as the best-ranked CONCACAF team in the 2015 FIFA U-17 World Cup, excluding Mexico, were seeded in position B1.
- Mexico, as champions of the 2015 CONCACAF U-17 Championship, were seeded in position C1.

The remaining nine teams were allocated to pots 2–4 designed to ensure balanced and competitive groups weighted equally by region. They were drawn in order and placed in the group position drawn from Pots A, B and C.

Pot 1	Pot 2	Pot 3	Pot 4
Panama; Costa Rica; Mexico	United States; Canada; Honduras	Jamaica; Cuba; Haiti	El Salvador; Curaçao; Suriname

The top two teams from each group in the group stage advance to the classification stage, where the six teams are drawn into two groups of three teams. The positions of each group winner and runner-up from the group stage were then drawn in group pairs, randomly into the two groups (D and E) for the classification stage.

The top two teams from each group in the classification stage qualify for the 2017 FIFA U-17 World Cup, with the group winners also advancing to the final to decide the champions of the CONCACAF U-17 Championship.

== Referees ==
- (Barbados) Adrián Skeete
- (Costa Rica) Juan Calderón
- (Cuba) Michel Rodríguez
- (Guatemala) Bryan López
- (Guyana) Gladwyn Johnson
- (Honduras) Saíd Martínez
- (Jamaica) Daneon Parchment
- (Mexico) Luis Enrique Santander
- (Panama) José Kellys Marquez
- (El Salvador) Ismael Cornejo
- (Trinidad and Tobago) Rodphin Harris
- (United States) Armando Villarreal

== Squads ==
Each squad could contain 20 players (including two goalkeepers).

== Group stage ==
The top two teams from each group in the group stage advanced to the classification stage.

Tiebreakers (for both group stage and classification stage)

The teams were ranked according to points (3 points for a win, 1 point for a draw, 0 points for a loss). If tied on points, tiebreakers were applied in the following order:

1. Greater number of points in matches between the tied teams;
2. Greater goal difference in matches between the tied teams (if more than two teams finish equal on points);
3. Greater number of goals scored in matches among the tied teams (if more than two teams finished equal on points);
4. Greater goal difference in all group matches;
5. Greater number of goals scored in all group matches;
6. Drawing of lots.

All times are local, EST (UTC−5).

=== Group A ===
Pos	Team	Pld	W	D	L	GF	GA	GD	Pts	Qualification
1	Panama (H)	3	2	1	0	5	2	+3	7	Classification stage
2	Honduras	3	2	0	1	8	5	+3	6	Classification stage
3	Curaçao	3	1	0	2	1	4	−3	3	
4	Haiti	3	0	1	2	1	4	−3	1	

Source: CONCACAF
Rules for classification: Group stage tiebreakers
(H) Hosts
21 April 2017
18:30

Curaçao	1–0	Haiti
Bernadina 43'	Report

Estadio Maracaná, Panama City
Referee: Michel Rodríguez (Cuba)
21 April 2017
21:00

Panama	4–2	Honduras
Guerrero 21', 24'; Orelien 87' (pen.), 89'	Report	Palma 16'; Mejía 49' (pen.)

Estadio Maracaná, Panama City
Referee: Ismael Cornejo (El Salvador)

24 April 2017
17:00

Honduras	3–0	Curaçao
Mejía 50', 52'; Cardona 90+3'	Report

Estadio Maracaná, Panama City
Referee: Juan Calderón (Costa Rica)
24 April 2017
19:30

Panama	0–0	Haiti
	Report

Estadio Maracaná, Panama City
Referee: Armando Villarreal (United States)

27 April 2017
17:00

Honduras	3–1	Haiti
López 70'; Mejía 82'; Palma 88'	Report	Leveille 10'

Estadio Maracaná, Panama City
Referee: Bryan López (Guatemala)
27 April 2017
19:30

Panama	1–0	Curaçao
Guerrero 35'	Report

Estadio Maracaná, Panama City
Referee: Adrián Skeete (Barbados)

=== Group B ===
Pos	Team	Pld	W	D	L	GF	GA	GD	Pts	Qualification
1	Costa Rica	3	3	0	0	8	2	+6	9	Classification stage
2	Cuba	3	1	1	1	4	5	−1	4	Classification stage
3	Canada	3	1	0	2	4	4	0	3	
4	Suriname	3	0	1	2	1	6	−5	1	

Source: CONCACAF
Rules for classification: Group stage tiebreakers
22 April 2017
12:30

Cuba	1–1	Suriname
Rendón 57'	Report	Hoever 83'

Estadio Maracaná, Panama City
Referee: Gladwyn Johnson (Guyana)
22 April 2017
15:00

Costa Rica	2–1	Canada
Alfaro 44', 90+5'	Report	Romeo 51'

Estadio Maracaná, Panama City
Referee: Bryan López (Guatemala)

25 April 2017
14:00

Canada	1–2	Cuba
Hojabrpour 71'	Report	Romero 26'; Cruz 59'

Estadio Maracaná, Panama City
Referee: Daneon Parchment (Jamaica)
25 April 2017
16:30

Costa Rica	3–0	Suriname
Cordero 14'; Abarca 64'; Montero 80'	Report

Estadio Maracaná, Panama City
Referee: Luis Enrique Santander (Mexico)

28 April 2017
17:30

Canada	2–0	Suriname
David 13', 56'	Report

Estadio Maracaná, Panama City
Referee: Armando Villarreal (United States)
28 April 2017
20:00

Costa Rica	3–1	Cuba
Coll 37' (o.g.); Gómez 68'; Jarquin 71'	Report	Savigne 49'

Estadio Maracaná, Panama City
Referee: Saíd Martínez (Honduras)

=== Group C ===
Pos	Team	Pld	W	D	L	GF	GA	GD	Pts	Qualification
1	United States	3	3	0	0	10	3	+7	9	Classification stage
2	Mexico	3	2	0	1	14	5	+9	6	Classification stage
3	Jamaica	3	1	0	2	4	11	−7	3	
4	El Salvador	3	0	0	3	1	10	−9	0	

Source: CONCACAF
Rules for classification: Group stage tiebreakers
23 April 2017
12:30

Jamaica	0–5	United States
	Report	Durkin 53'; Weah 77'; Sargent 87'; Akinola 88', 90+2'

Estadio Maracaná, Panama City
Referee: Adrián Skeete (Barbados)
23 April 2017
15:00

Mexico	6–0	El Salvador
Menjívar 1' (o.g.); Olivas 31'; López 35', 46'; Ávila 41' (o.g.); Maeda 75'	Report

Estadio Maracaná, Panama City
Referee: Saíd Martínez (Honduras)

26 April 2017
15:00

El Salvador	1–3	Jamaica
Cerritos 53' (pen.)	Report	McIntosh 18'; Parris 83', 90+1'

Estadio Maracaná, Panama City
Referee: Rodphin Harris (Trinidad and Tobago)
26 April 2017
17:30

Mexico	3–4	United States
De la Rosa 6', 44'; Lindsey 90+2' (o.g.)	Report	Sargent 26', 40'; Ferri 51'; Akinola 84'

Estadio Maracaná, Panama City
Referee: José Kellys Marquez (Panama)

29 April 2017
17:00

El Salvador	0–1	United States
	Report	Jones 52'

Estadio Maracaná, Panama City
Referee: Michel Rodríguez (Cuba)
29 April 2017
19:30

Mexico	5–1	Jamaica
Torres 24', 35'; López 32', 62'; Vázquez 61'	Report	Verley 71'

Estadio Maracaná, Panama City
Referee: Juan Calderón (Costa Rica)

== Classification stage ==
The top two teams from each group in the classification stage qualified for the 2017 FIFA U-17 World Cup, with the group winners also advancing to the final to decide the champions of the CONCACAF U-17 Championship.

=== Group D ===
Pos	Team	Pld	W	D	L	GF	GA	GD	Pts	Qualification
1	United States	2	2	0	0	9	2	+7	6	Final and 2017 FIFA U-17 World Cup
2	Honduras	2	1	0	1	7	4	+3	3	2017 FIFA U-17 World Cup
3	Cuba	2	0	0	2	3	13	−10	0	

Source: CONCACAF
Rules for classification: Group stage tiebreakers
1 May 2017
17:30

Cuba	1–7	Honduras
Savigne 87'	Report	Mejía 11', 36', 42'; Palacios 16', 31', 73'; Pérez 24'

Estadio Maracaná, Panama City
Referee: José Kellys Marquez (Panama)

3 May 2017
15:30

Honduras	0–3	United States
	Report	Sargent 25', 82'; Akinola 65'

Estadio Maracaná, Panama City
Referee: Luis Enrique Santander (Mexico)

5 May 2017
17:30

Cuba	2–6	United States
Savigne 19'; Vasquez 47' (o.g.)	Report	Vassilev 16'; Coll 37' (o.g.); Carleton 39'; Jones 49'; Reynolds 84'; Weah 88'

Estadio Maracaná, Panama City
Referee: Daneon Parchment (Jamaica)

=== Group E ===
Pos	Team	Pld	W	D	L	GF	GA	GD	Pts	Qualification
1	Mexico	2	2	0	0	7	1	+6	6	Final and 2017 FIFA U-17 World Cup
2	Costa Rica	2	1	0	1	3	7	−4	3	2017 FIFA U-17 World Cup
3	Panama (H)	2	0	0	2	1	3	−2	0	

Source: CONCACAF
Rules for classification: Group stage tiebreakers
(H) Hosts
1 May 2017
20:00

Costa Rica	2–1	Panama
Alfaro 31'; Arce 41'	Report	Guerrero 44'

Estadio Maracaná, Panama City
Referee: Bryan López (Guatemala)

3 May 2017
18:00

Panama	0–1	Mexico
	Report	Torres 32'

Estadio Maracaná, Panama City
Referee: Ismael Cornejo (El Salvador)

5 May 2017
20:00

Costa Rica	1–6	Mexico
Abarca 4'	Report	Olivas 2', 40' (pen.); De la Rosa 20'; López 30', 51'; Sandoval 80'

Estadio Maracaná, Panama City
Referee: Armando Villarreal (United States)

== Final ==
If the final was level at the end of 90 minutes, no extra time would be played and the match would be decided by a penalty shoot-out.

7 May 2017
15:00

United States	1–1	Mexico
Carleton 62'	Report	Robles 90+2'
Penalties
Sargent (penalty scored); Weah (penalty scored); Goslin (penalty scored); Watts (penalty missed); Sands (penalty scored)	4–5	(penalty scored) López; (penalty scored) Robles; (penalty scored) Torres; (penalty scored) Gutiérrez; (penalty scored) De la Rosa

Estadio Rommel Fernández, Panama City
Referee: Saíd Martínez (Honduras)

== Awards ==
=== Winners ===
2017 CONCACAF U-17 Championship winners

Mexico
Seventh title

=== Individual awards ===
The following awards were given at the conclusion of the tournament.

Golden Ball

- (Mexico) Jairo Torres

Golden Boot

- (Honduras) Carlos Mejía (7 goals)

Golden Glove

- (United States) Justin Garces

Fair Play Award

- Mexico

=== Best XI ===
- Goalkeeper: (United States) Justin Garces
- Right back: (United States) Jaylin Lindsey
- Center back: (United States) James Sands
- Center back: (Mexico) Luis Olivas
- Left back: (Costa Rica) Walter Cortés
- Right midfielder: (Mexico) Jairo Torres
- Central midfielder: (United States) Chris Durkin
- Central midfielder: (Mexico) Alexis Gutiérrez
- Left midfielder: (Honduras) Carlos Mejía
- Forward: (Mexico) Daniel López
- Forward: (United States) Josh Sargent

== Goalscorers ==
7 goals

- (Honduras) Carlos Mejía

6 goals

- (Mexico) Daniel López

5 goals

- (United States) Josh Sargent

4 goals

- (Panama) Eduardo Guerrero
- (United States) Ayo Akinola

3 goals

- (Costa Rica) José Alfaro
- (Cuba) Brian Savigne
- (Honduras) Patrick Palacios
- (Mexico) Roberto de la Rosa
- (Mexico) Luis Olivas
- (Mexico) Jairo Torres

2 goals

- (Canada) Jonathan David
- (Costa Rica) Josué Abarca
- (Honduras) Luis Enrique Palma
- (Jamaica) Ricardo McIntosh
- (Panama) Ángel Orelien
- (United States) Andrew Carleton
- (United States) Zyen Jones
- (United States) Tim Weah

1 goal

- (Canada) Alessandro Hojabrpour
- (Canada) Antonio Rocco Romeo
- (Costa Rica) Karin Arce
- (Costa Rica) Julen Cordero
- (Costa Rica) Andrés Gómez
- (Costa Rica) Yecxy Jarquin
- (Costa Rica) Justin Montero
- (Cuba) Manuel Cruz
- (Cuba) Bruno Rendón
- (Cuba) Yandry Romero
- (Curaçao) Nathan Bernadina
- (El Salvador) Alexis Cerritos
- (Haiti) Obenson Leveille
- (Honduras) David Cardona
- (Honduras) Everson López
- (Honduras) Osbed Pérez
- (Jamaica) Kaheem Parris
- (Jamaica) Jeremy Verley
- (Mexico) Alan Maeda
- (Mexico) Carlos Robles
- (Mexico) Raúl Sandoval
- (Mexico) Adrián Vázquez
- (Suriname) Archero Hoever
- (United States) Chris Durkin
- (United States) Blaine Ferri
- (United States) Indiana Vassilev
- (United States) Bryan Reynolds

2 own goals

- (Cuba) Miguel Coll (playing against Costa Rica and United States)

1 own goal

- (El Salvador) Giovanni Ávila (playing against Mexico)
- (El Salvador) Kevin Menjívar (playing against Mexico)
- (United States) Jaylin Lindsey (playing against Mexico)
- (United States) Arturo Vasquez (playing against Cuba)

== Qualified teams for FIFA U-17 World Cup ==
The following four teams from CONCACAF qualified for the 2017 FIFA U-17 World Cup.

Team	Qualified on	Previous appearances in tournament^{1}
Mexico	3 May 2017	12 (1985, 1987, 1991, 1993, 1997, 1999, 2003, **2005**, 2009, **2011**, 2013, 2015)
United States	5 May 2017	15 (1985, 1987, 1989, 1991, 1993, 1995, 1997, 1999, 2001, 2003, 2005, 2007, 2009, 2011, 2015)
Honduras	3 May 2017	4 (2007, 2009, 2013, 2015)
Costa Rica	3 May 2017	9 (1985, 1995, 1997, 2001, 2003, 2005, 2007, 2009, 2015)

^{1} Bold indicates champion for that year. Italic indicates host for that year.
