= Julen Cordero =

Costa Rican footballer (born 2001)

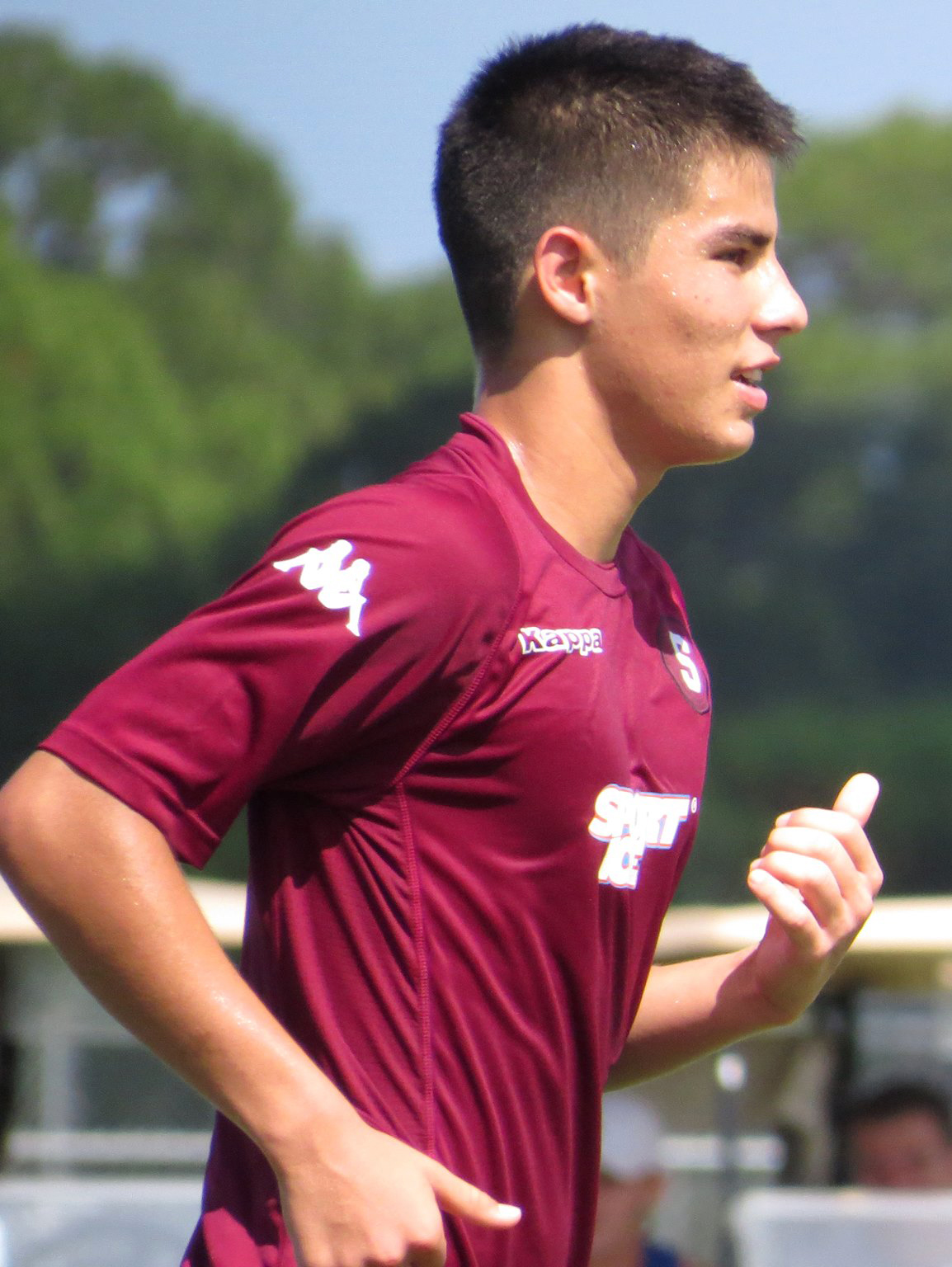

Personal information
- Full name: Julen Cordero González
- Date of birth: 3 July 2001 (age 25)
- Place of birth: San José, Costa Rica
- Height: 1.78 m (5 ft 10 in)
- Position: Midfielder

Team information
- Current team: FC Samtredia
- Number: 10

Senior career*
Years	Team	Apps	(Gls)
2017–	Saprissa	11	(0)
2019–2021	→ Le Havre II (loan)	12	(2)

International career^{‡}
2017	Costa Rica U17	7	(1)
2018	Costa Rica U18	2	(1)
- Costa Rica U20
- * Club domestic league appearances and goals as of 07:37, 4 February 2022 (UTC) ‡ National team caps and goals as of 07:37, 4 February 2022 (UTC)

Julen Cordero González (born 3 July 2001) is a Costa Rican professional footballer who currently plays as a midfielder for Saprissa.

== Career statistics ==
=== Club ===
As of 4 February 2022.

Club	Season	League			Cup		Continental		Other		Total	
Club	Season	Division	Apps	Goals	Apps	Goals	Apps	Goals	Apps	Goals	Apps	Goals
Saprissa	2017–18	Liga FPD	1	0	0	0	0	0	0	0	1	0
Saprissa	2018–19	Liga FPD	4	0	0	0	0	0	0	0	4	0
Saprissa	2019–20	Liga FPD	0	0	0	0	0	0	0	0	0	0
Saprissa	2020–21	Liga FPD	0	0	0	0	0	0	0	0	0	0
Saprissa	2021–22	Liga FPD	6	0	0	0	2 (Note: Appearances in the Copa Libertadores)	0	0	0	8	0
Saprissa	Total		11	0	0	0	2	0	0	0	13	0
Le Havre II (loan)	2019–20	Championnat National 3	7	1	–		–		0	0	7	1
Le Havre II (loan)	2020–21	Championnat National 3	5	1	–		–		0	0	5	1
Le Havre II (loan)	Total		12	2	0	0	0	0	0	0	12	2
Career total			23	2	0	0	2	0	0	0	25	2
