= Yecxy Jarquín =

Costa Rican footballer (born 2000)

Personal information
- Full name: Yecxy Jarquín Ramos
- Date of birth: 22 May 2000 (age 26)
- Place of birth: Santa Cruz, Costa Rica
- Height: 1.62 m (5 ft 4 in)
- Position: Right winger

Team information
- Current team: Santa Cruz PFA
- Number: 10

Youth career
- La Carreta
- Municipal Liberia

Senior career*
| Years | Team | Apps | (Gls) |
| 2017–2018 | Municipal Liberia | 25 | (1) |
| 2018–2019 | Herediano | 2 | (0) |
| 2019 | → Universitarios (loan) | 1 | (0) |
| 2020 | Guanacasteca | | |
| 2020–2021 | Municipal Grecia | 17 | (0) |
| 2021–2025 | Escorpiones | | |
| 2025 | San Carlos FC | | |
| 2025– | Santa Cruz PFA | | |

International career
| 2017 | Costa Rica U17 | 6 | (2) |
| 2018 | Costa Rica U20 | 6 | (0) |
- * Club domestic league appearances and goals as of 21:11, 3 July 2021 (UTC)

Yecxy Jarquín Ramos (born 22 May 2000) is a Costa Rican footballer who plays as a right winger for Santa Cruz PFA.

== Club career ==
=== Municipal Liberia ===
Jarquín started playing football at a club called La Carreta with his cousin as a coach, where they played against Municipal Liberia a few times, before the club called him and he joined them. He got his professional debut for the club at the age of 17 on 30 July 2017 against Limón F.C. in the Liga FPD. Jarquín started on the bench, before replacing Armando Espinoza in the 64th minute. He quickly established himself as a key player, although his young age, and played 25 league games in the 2017–18 season.

=== Herediano ===
On 9 June 2018, C.S. Herediano announced the signing of the young winger on a four-year deal. He got his debut in a 3–0 victory against Santos de Guápiles F.C. on 5 August 2018. Jarquín made one more appearance in September 2018.

With only two appearances for Herediano, 18-year old Jarquín was sent out on loan to La U Universitarios in the summer 2019. He left the pitch 13 minutes into his debut, carried out on a stretcher after a serious injury, against C.S. Cartaginés on 4 August 2019, after coming on as a substitute. He left the club again at the end of the year.

=== Municipal Grecia ===
After a spell at AD Guanacasteca in 2020, Jarquín returned to professional football in July 2020 for the first time since the injury in August 2019, when he signed with Municipal Grecia. He made his debut on 17 August 2020 against his former club C.S. Herediano.

=== Escorpiones ===
In July 2021, Jarquín joined Escorpiones.

== International career ==
In October 2018, Jarquín was called up for the Costa Rican U20 squad to the 2018 CONCACAF U-20 Championship games in November.
