= Josué Abarca =

Costa Rican footballer (born 2000)

Personal information
- Full name: Josué Andrés Abarca Valverde
- Date of birth: 4 January 2000 (age 26)
- Place of birth: San Isidro de El General, Costa Rica
- Height: 1.68 m (5 ft 6 in)
- Position: Winger

Youth career
- –2011: Pueblo Nuevo
- 2011–2013: Pérez Zeledón
- 2013–2016: Carmelita

Senior career*
Years	Team	Apps	(Gls)
2016–2017	Carmelita	2	(0)
2016–2017	→ UCR (loan)	7	(0)
2018	Desamparados		
2018	→ Santos Laguna (loan)	0	(0)
2019	LD Alajuelense	1	(0)
2020–2021	Desamparados		
2021	→ Guadalupe (loan)	4	(0)
2022	Escorpiones		

International career
2015	Costa Rica U15		
2017	Costa Rica U17	6	(2)
2018	Costa Rica U20	6	(1)
- * Club domestic league appearances and goals as of 20:18, 8 August 2021 (UTC)

Josué Andrés Abarca Valverde (born 4 January 2000) is a Costa Rican footballer who plays as a winger.

== Career ==
=== Early years ===
Abarca was born and raised in San Isidro de El General of the canton of Pérez Zeledón, in the southern part of the province of San José in Costa Rica. He started playing football at the age of 10 at the local club Pueblo Nuevo de Cajón FC. After a game against Municipal Pérez Zeledón in 2011, where Abarca scored three goals, he got a call from the club and ended up joining them.

But Abarca did not only caught Pérez Zeledón's interest. Some time later, regional tests of the national team were held in which this attacker stood out and ended up being part of the U-13 team of Costa Rica and later also the U-15.

=== Carmelita ===
Abarca joined A.D. Carmelita at the age of 13 from Pérez Zeledón. At the age of 15, Abarca was spotted by Portuguese club FC Porto and invited to a two-week trial. He played four friendly games for the clubs youth team and scored one goal during his trial. However, due to the rules, he had to wait until he was 18 year old, before an eventual transfer. Therefore, he continued to play for Carmelita.

==== Loan to UCR ====
In the summer 2016, former Carmelita manager, Guilherme Farinha, brought 16-year old Abarca to UCR on a loan deal for the 2016–17 season. He got his professional debut in the Liga FPD on 17 July 2016 against Carmelita, when he replaced Víctor Gutiérrez in the 82nd minute. He made a total of seven league appearances during the loan spell.

==== Return to Carmelita ====
Abarca returned to Carmelita in the summer 2017, after playing seven league games for UCR. After returning, he also made his official debut for Carmelita on 1 November 2017 against Guadalupe. That was one out of two appearances he made for Carmelita, before he left the club at the end of 2017.

=== Desamparados ===
After leaving Carmelita, Abarca joined Fútbol Consultants Moravia for the 2018. The club was later renamed Fútbol Consultants Desamparados.

On 31 January 2018, Abarca joined Mexican club Santos Laguna on a two-year loan deal. Abarca was registered for the clubs U-20 team. However, he returned to Costa Rica after one year with only playing official games for the Mexican clubs U-20 team. Abarca also played for Santos Laguna's first team in a pre-season friendly game in the United States.

=== LD Alajuelense ===
Due to family reasons, Abarca was forced to leave Mexico and return to Costa Rica. After returning, Abarca was signed by LD Alajuelense in January 2019. In April, Abarca got injured during a training session. He fought to get a place on the first team, however, without success and he ended up leaving the club at the end of the year with only one appearance in October 2019 against Municipal Grecia.

=== Return to Desamparados ===
For the 2020 season, Abarca returned to Fútbol Consultants Desamparados. However, Abarca still fought to recover from the same injury he got in April 2019.

On 9 June 2021 Desamparados confirmed, that Abarca would play on loan for Guadalupe FC for the next two years until 30 June 2023. However, Guadalupe decided to cancel the loan-spell on 24 October 2021.

=== Escorpiones ===
On 28 December 2021, Abarca joined Escorpiones.

== International career ==
Formerly, Abarca was a part of the U-13 and U-15 national teams of Costa Rica. In 2017, Abarca played six games for Costa Rica in the 2017 FIFA U-17 World Cup and in the following year, also six game in the 2018 CONCACAF U-20 Championship.
