= Manuel Cruz (footballer) =

Spanish footballer (1909–1970)

Personal information
- Full name: Manuel de la Cruz Martínez
- Date of birth: 27 March 1909
- Place of birth: Oran, Algeria
- Date of death: 22 December 1970 (aged 61)
- Place of death: Barcelona, Spain
- Position: Goalkeeper

Senior career*
Years	Team	Apps	(Gls)
1926–1928	Martinenc		
1928–1929	CE Europa	3	(0)
1929–1932	Horta		
1932–1934	Barcelona	2	(0)
1934–1936	Sants		
1936–1938	Sant Andreu		
Total		5	(0)

International career
1934	Catalonia	1	(0)

Managerial career
- 1957–1958: Castellón
- 1964–1965: CE Europa
- * Club domestic league appearances and goals

Manuel de la Cruz Martínez (27 March 1909 – 22 December 1970) was a Spanish footballer who played as a midfielder for CE Europa in 1928–29 and Barcelona between 1932 and 1934.

== Club career ==
Born on 27 March 1909 in Oran, Algeria, Manuel Cruz moved to Catalonia, where he began his football career at his hometown club Martinenc in 1926, aged 17, with whom he played for two years, until 1928, when he joined CE Europa. In his first (and only) season in Europa, he played a total of 3 La Liga matches. In 1929, he went to Horta, where he stayed for three years, until 1932, when he was signed by Barcelona, thus becoming the first-ever Barça player to have been born in Africa.

In December 1932, Cruz was an unused substitute in an El Clásico. Indeed, his playing time at Barça was severely limited due to the presence of Juan José Nogués, who was the club's starting goalkeeper at the time, thus having few opportunities with the first team during the two years he played there, starting in a total of 40 matches, of which only two were official, with both of them being league fixtures in January 1934, keeping a clean-sheet in a 4–0 win over Arenas, but conceding four in a 4–0 loss to Real Madrid. He was at fault for Madrid's fourth goal, as Eugenio Hilario's close range shot slipped through his hands and into his own goal.

After leaving Barça in 1934, Cruz played a further two seasons at both Sants (1934–36) and Sant Andreu (1936–38).

== International career ==
Like so many other Barça players, Cruz was eligible to play for the Catalan national team, earning his first (and only) cap for Catalonia in a friendly for the benefit of the Mutual Esportiva, helping his side to a 4–2 win.

== Managerial career ==
After retiring, Cruz became a manager, overseeing Castellón in the 1957–58 season, and his former club Europa in the 1964–65 season.

== Death ==
Cruz died in Barcelona on 22 December 1970, at the age of 61.
