= 2014–15 UEFA Youth League group stage =

Football tournament group stage

The 2014–15 UEFA Youth League group stage was played from 16 September to 11 December 2014. A total of 32 teams competed to decide the 16 teams that would advance to the knockout phase of the 2014–15 UEFA Youth League.

== Draw ==
The youth teams of the 32 clubs which qualified for the 2014–15 UEFA Champions League group stage entered the competition.

The 32 teams were drawn into eight groups of four. There was no separate draw held, with the group compositions identical to the draw for the 2014–15 UEFA Champions League group stage, which was held on 28 August 2014, 17:45 CEST, at the Grimaldi Forum in Monaco.

Key to colours
Group winners advanced to the round of 16

Pot 1 Team (Spain) Real Madrid (Spain) Barcelona (Germany) Bayern Munich (England) Chelsea (Portugal) Benfica (Spain) Atlético Madrid (England) Arsenal (Portugal) Porto	Pot 2 Team (Germany) Schalke 04 (Germany) Borussia Dortmund (Italy) Juventus (France) Paris Saint-Germain (Ukraine) Shakhtar Donetsk (Switzerland) Basel (Russia) Zenit Saint Petersburg (England) Manchester City	Pot 3 Team (Germany) Bayer Leverkusen (Greece) Olympiacos (Russia) CSKA Moscow (Netherlands) Ajax (England) Liverpool (Portugal) Sporting CP (Turkey) Galatasaray (Spain) Athletic Bilbao	Pot 4 Team (Belgium) Anderlecht (Italy) Roma (Cyprus) APOEL (Belarus) BATE Borisov (Bulgaria) Ludogorets Razgrad (Slovenia) Maribor (France) Monaco (Sweden) Malmö FF

== Format ==
In each group, teams played against each other home-and-away in a round-robin format. The eight group winners and runners-up advanced to the round of 16.

=== Tiebreakers ===
The teams were ranked according to points (3 points for a win, 1 point for a draw, 0 points for a loss). If two or more teams were equal on points on completion of the group matches, the following criteria were applied in the order given to determine the rankings:

1. higher number of points obtained in the group matches played among the teams in question;
2. superior goal difference from the group matches played among the teams in question;
3. higher number of goals scored in the group matches played among the teams in question;
4. higher number of goals scored away from home in the group matches played among the teams in question;
5. If, after applying criteria 1 to 4 to several teams, two teams still had an equal ranking, criteria 1 to 4 were reapplied exclusively to the matches between the two teams in question to determine their final rankings. If this procedure did not lead to a decision, criteria 6 to 9 applied;
6. superior goal difference from all group matches played;
7. higher number of goals scored from all group matches played;
8. lower disciplinary points total based only on yellow and red cards received during the group stage (red card = 3 points, yellow card = 1 point, expulsion for two yellow cards in one match = 3 points);
9. drawing of lots.

== Groups ==
The matchdays were 16–18 September, 30 September–2 October, 21–23 October, 4–6 November, 25–27 November and 9–11 December 2014, with the matches played on the same matchday as the corresponding Champions League matches, but not necessarily on the same day. The group winners and runners-up advanced to the round of 16. Times up to 25 October 2014 (matchdays 1–3) were CEST (UTC+2), thereafter (matchdays 4–6) times were CET (UTC+1).

=== Group A ===
Pos	Team	Pld	W	D	L	GF	GA	GD	Pts	Qualification	ATM	OLY	JUV	MAL
1	(Spain) Atlético Madrid	6	5	0	1	11	5	+6	15	Advance to knockout phase	—	0–2	1–0	3–1
2	(Greece) Olympiacos	6	4	1	1	12	4	+8	13	Advance to knockout phase	1–2	—	1–1	2–0
3	(Italy) Juventus	6	1	2	3	5	10	−5	5		0–3	0–3	—	2–0
4	(Sweden) Malmö FF	6	0	1	5	5	14	−9	1		1–2	1–3	2–2	—

Source: UEFA
Rules for classification: Group stage tiebreakers
16 September 2014
15:00

Juventus (Italy)	2–0	(Sweden) Malmö FF
Soumah 24'; Udoh 90+1'	Report

Stadio Silvio Piola, Vercelli
Attendance: 400
Referee: Peter Královič (Slovakia)
16 September 2014
18:00

Olympiacos (Greece)	1–2	(Spain) Atlético Madrid
Vergos 6'	Report	Fede 60'; Roberto 74'

Renti Training Centre, Piraeus
Attendance: 500
Referee: Tsvetan Krastev (Bulgaria)

1 October 2014
12:00

Atlético Madrid (Spain)	1–0	(Italy) Juventus
Roberto 29'	Report

Ciudad Deportiva Cerro Del Espino, Majadahonda
Attendance: 420
Referee: Markus Hameter (Austria)
1 October 2014
15:30

Malmö FF (Sweden)	1–3	(Greece) Olympiacos
Cederholm 18'	Report	Laçi 34'; Vergos 39', 43' (pen.)

Malmö Idrottsplats, Malmö
Attendance: 744
Referee: Tore Hansen (Norway)

22 October 2014
12:00

Atlético Madrid (Spain)	3–1	(Sweden) Malmö FF
Roberto 45+1'; Fede 59'; Diedhiou 87'	Report	Hümmet 50'

Ciudad Deportiva Cerro Del Espino, Majadahonda
Attendance: 511
Referee: Nicolas Rainville (France)
22 October 2014
18:00

Olympiacos (Greece)	1–1	(Italy) Juventus
Laçi 7'	Report	Vatousiadis 65' (o.g.)

Renti Training Centre, Piraeus
Attendance: 556
Referee: Bardhyl Pashaj (Albania)

4 November 2014
14:30

Juventus (Italy)	0–3	(Greece) Olympiacos
	Report	Roussos 50' (o.g.); Garefalakis 76'; Laçi 87'

Stadio Silvio Piola, Vercelli
Attendance: 400
Referee: Erik Lambrechts (Belgium)
4 November 2014
15:30

Malmö FF (Sweden)	1–2	(Spain) Atlético Madrid
Hernandez 22' (o.g.)	Report	Morente 2'; Gama 79'

Malmö Idrottsplats, Malmö
Attendance: 1,127
Referee: Petur Reinert (Faroe Islands)

26 November 2014
13:00

Atlético Madrid (Spain)	0–2	(Greece) Olympiacos
	Report	Megaritis 59'; Garefalakis 79'

Ciudad Deportiva Cerro Del Espino, Majadahonda
Attendance: 520
Referee: Sven Bindels (Luxembourg)
26 November 2014
15:30

Malmö FF (Sweden)	2–2	(Italy) Juventus
Blixt 69'; Stojanovic-Fredin 82'	Report	Clemenza 50'; Buenacasa 66'

Malmö Idrottsplats, Malmö
Attendance: 1,062
Referee: Mads-Kristoffer Kristoffersen (Denmark)

9 December 2014
18:00

Olympiacos (Greece)	2–0	(Sweden) Malmö FF
Laçi 19'; Vergos 67'	Report

Renti Training Centre, Piraeus
Attendance: 300
Referee: Enea Jorgji (Albania)
9 December 2014
18:00

Juventus (Italy)	0–3	(Spain) Atlético Madrid
	Report	Mohedano 5'; Diedhiou 23'; Morente 47' (pen.)

Stadio Silvio Piola, Vercelli
Attendance: 200
Referee: Vitali Meshkov (Russia)

=== Group B ===
Pos	Team	Pld	W	D	L	GF	GA	GD	Pts	Qualification	RMA	LIV	BSL	LUD
1	(Spain) Real Madrid	6	4	0	2	19	7	+12	12	Advance to knockout phase	—	4–1	2–0	6–0
2	(England) Liverpool	6	4	0	2	16	9	+7	12	Advance to knockout phase	3–2	—	3–0	4–0
3	(Switzerland) Basel	6	4	0	2	17	9	+8	12		3–2	3–2	—	6–0
4	(Bulgaria) Ludogorets Razgrad	6	0	0	6	0	27	−27	0		0–3	0–3	0–5	—

Source: UEFA
Rules for classification: Group stage tiebreakers
16 September 2014
15:00

Liverpool (England)	4–0	(Bulgaria) Ludogorets Razgrad
Sinclair 30', 87'; Cleary 38'; O'Hanlon 39'	Report

Langtree Park, St Helens
Attendance: 131
Referee: Mervyn Smyth (Northern Ireland)
16 September 2014
18:00

Real Madrid (Spain)	2–0	(Switzerland) Basel
Mayoral 26'; Harper 57'	Report

Alfredo di Stéfano, Madrid
Attendance: 520
Referee: Bartosz Frankowski (Poland)

1 October 2014
15:00

Ludogorets Razgrad (Bulgaria)	0–3	(Spain) Real Madrid
	Report	Cedrés 20'; Lazo 53', 90'

Georgi Asparuhov Stadium, Sofia
Attendance: 4,230
Referee: Anatoliy Abdula (Ukraine)
1 October 2014
15:00

Basel (Switzerland)	3–2	(England) Liverpool
Itten 14', 90'; Al. Ajeti 87'	Report	Sinclair 67', 72'

Youth Campus Basel, Münchenstein
Attendance: 236
Referee: Nikola Dabanović (Montenegro)

22 October 2014
15:00

Ludogorets Razgrad (Bulgaria)	0–5	(Switzerland) Basel
	Report	Cani 13'; Al. Ajeti 19', 42'; Itten 64'; Pickel 65'

Georgi Asparuhov Stadium, Sofia
Attendance: 5,563
Referee: Sergei Ivanov (Russia)
22 October 2014
15:00

Liverpool (England)	3–2	(Spain) Real Madrid
Brannagan 15'; Brewitt 20'; Wilson 88'	Report	Lienhart 53'; Harper 67'

Langtree Park, St Helens
Attendance: 2,215
Referee: Neil Doyle (Republic of Ireland)

4 November 2014
15:00

Basel (Switzerland)	6–0	(Bulgaria) Ludogorets Razgrad
Al. Ajeti 51'; Weber 54'; Manzambi 57', 90+3'; Hunziker 74'; Itten 76'	Report

Youth Campus Basel, Münchenstein
Attendance: 200
Referee: Svein-Erik Edvartsen (Norway)
4 November 2014
16:00

Real Madrid (Spain)	4–1	(England) Liverpool
Cedrés 7'; Harper 73'; Mayoral 78' (pen.); Lazo 87'	Report	Brannagan 39'

Alfredo di Stéfano, Madrid
Attendance: 750
Referee: Mitja Žganec (Slovenia)

26 November 2014
15:00

Ludogorets Razgrad (Bulgaria)	0–3	(England) Liverpool
	Report	Ojo 26', 82'; Sinclair 58'

Georgi Asparuhov Stadium, Sofia
Attendance: 1,225
Referee: Ilias Spathas (Greece)
26 November 2014
15:00

Basel (Switzerland)	3–2	(Spain) Real Madrid
Cani 8'; Huser 45'; Hunziker 49'	Report	Harper 40'; Mayoral 42'

Youth Campus Basel, Münchenstein
Attendance: 700
Referee: Benoît Bastien (France)

9 December 2014
15:00

Liverpool (England)	3–0	(Switzerland) Basel
Kent 38'; Cleary 90+4'; Sinclair 90+11'	Report

Langtree Park, St Helens
Attendance: 425
Referee: Bryn Markham-Jones (Wales)
9 December 2014
15:00

Real Madrid (Spain)	6–0	(Bulgaria) Ludogorets Razgrad
Mayoral 7', 49', 54'; Molina 41', 77'; Petrov 90+1' (o.g.)	Report

Alfredo di Stéfano, Madrid
Attendance: 300
Referee: Laurent Kopriwa (Luxembourg)

=== Group C ===
Pos	Team	Pld	W	D	L	GF	GA	GD	Pts	Qualification	BEN	ZEN	LEV	MON
1	(Portugal) Benfica	6	4	1	1	12	8	+4	13	Advance to knockout phase	—	0–0	4–1	3–0
2	(Russia) Zenit Saint Petersburg	6	3	1	2	12	9	+3	10	Advance to knockout phase	5–1	—	0–3	0–3
3	(Germany) Bayer Leverkusen	6	2	0	4	12	14	−2	6		2–3	1–4	—	4–0
4	(France) Monaco	6	2	0	4	7	12	−5	6		0–1	1–3	3–1	—

Source: UEFA
Rules for classification: Group stage tiebreakers
16 September 2014
15:00

Monaco (France)	3–1	(Germany) Bayer Leverkusen
Martinez 4'; Chaïbi 45+1', 77'	Report	Brašnić 49'

Stade de formation AS Monaco 1, La Turbie
Attendance: 264
Referee: Ádám Németh (Hungary)
16 September 2014
16:00

Benfica (Portugal)	0–0	(Russia) Zenit Saint Petersburg
	Report

Caixa Futebol Campus, Seixal
Attendance: 455
Referee: Jonathan Lardot (Belgium)

1 October 2014
11:00

Zenit Saint Petersburg (Russia)	0–3	(France) Monaco
	Report	Touré 7'; Andzouana 75'; N'Guinda 78'

Minor Sport Arena Petrovsky, Saint Petersburg
Attendance: 425
Referee: Aleksandrs Anufrijevs (Latvia)
1 October 2014
14:00

Bayer Leverkusen (Germany)	2–3	(Portugal) Benfica
Brašnić 21' (pen.), 90+4'	Report	Carvalho 54', 56'; Baldé 72'

Ulrich Haberland Stadion, Leverkusen
Attendance: 431
Referee: Dumitru Muntean (Moldova)

22 October 2014
13:00

Bayer Leverkusen (Germany)	1–4	(Russia) Zenit Saint Petersburg
Brašnić 90+2'	Report	Dolgov 45', 58'; Yaroshenko 63'; Khodzhaniyazov 89'

Ulrich Haberland Stadion, Leverkusen
Attendance: 331
Referee: Fran Jović (Croatia)
22 October 2014
15:00

Monaco (France)	0–1	(Portugal) Benfica
	Report	Pereira 34'

Stade de formation AS Monaco 1, La Turbie
Attendance: 750
Referee: Alan Mario Sant (Malta)

4 November 2014
11:00

Zenit Saint Petersburg (Russia)	0–3	(Germany) Bayer Leverkusen
	Report	Frey 25'; Richter 55'; Brašnić 63'

Minor Sport Arena Petrovsky, Saint Petersburg
Attendance: 450
Referee: Sergejus Slyva (Lithuania)
4 November 2014
16:00

Benfica (Portugal)	3–0	(France) Monaco
Costa 8'; Baldé 22'; Gonçalves 82'	Report

Caixa Futebol Campus, Seixal
Attendance: 500
Referee: Laurent Kopriwa (Luxembourg)

26 November 2014
11:00

Zenit Saint Petersburg (Russia)	5–1	(Portugal) Benfica
Osipov 58'; Khodzhaniyazov 68'; Sheydayev 72' (pen.); Skopintsev 86'; Pronichev 88'	Report	Pereira 4'

Minor Sport Arena Petrovsky, Saint Petersburg
Attendance: 268
Referee: Gunnar Jarl Jónsson (Iceland)
26 November 2014
14:00

Bayer Leverkusen (Germany)	4–0	(France) Monaco
Gemein 45'; Frey 50' (pen.); Henrichs 62'; Rother 76'	Report

Ulrich Haberland Stadion, Leverkusen
Attendance: 357
Referee: Zbynek Proske (Czech Republic)

9 December 2014
15:00

Monaco (France)	1–3	(Russia) Zenit Saint Petersburg
Cardona 88'	Report	Kubyshkin 3', 41'; Nazimov 53'

Stade de formation AS Monaco 1, La Turbie
Attendance: 123
Referee: Bart Vertenten (Belgium)
9 December 2014
16:00

Benfica (Portugal)	4–1	(Germany) Bayer Leverkusen
Costa 54', 79'; Sarkic 90+4'; Baldé 90+5'	Report	Frey 65'

Caixa Futebol Campus, Seixal
Attendance: 318
Referee: Manuel Schuettengruber (Austria)

=== Group D ===
Pos	Team	Pld	W	D	L	GF	GA	GD	Pts	Qualification	AND	ARS	GAL	DOR
1	(Belgium) Anderlecht	6	4	1	1	15	8	+7	13	Advance to knockout phase	—	4–3	3–0 (Note: The match was awarded as a 3–0 win for Anderlecht after the match was abandoned in the 90+5th minute (with Anderlecht leading 2–0) due to crowd disturbances by Galatasaray supporters.)	5–0
2	(England) Arsenal	6	4	0	2	15	8	+7	12	Advance to knockout phase	1–2	—	5–1	1–0
3	(Turkey) Galatasaray	6	2	0	4	10	18	−8	6		3–0	1–3	—	3–2
4	(Germany) Borussia Dortmund	6	1	1	4	8	14	−6	4		1–1	0–2	5–2	—

Source: UEFA
Rules for classification: Group stage tiebreakers
Notes:
16 September 2014
15:00

Galatasaray (Turkey)	3–0	(Belgium) Anderlecht
Gelmen 34'; De Medina 42' (o.g.); Faes 75' (o.g.)	Report

Esenyurt Incirtepe Stadyumu, Istanbul
Attendance: 875
Referee: Dejan Jakimovski (Macedonia)
17 September 2014
12:00

Borussia Dortmund (Germany)	0–2	(England) Arsenal
	Report	Hinds 14', 32'

Montanhydraulik-Stadion, Holzwickede
Attendance: 550
Referee: Jari Järvinen (Finland)

1 October 2014
15:00

Arsenal (England)	5–1	(Turkey) Galatasaray
Zelalem 45'; Hinds 57'; Willock 59'; Iwobi 66'; Crowley 71' (pen.)	Report	Kopuz 90+4'

Meadow Park, Borehamwood
Attendance: 375
Referee: Thoroddur Hjaltalin (Iceland)
2 October 2014
17:00

Anderlecht (Belgium)	5–0	(Germany) Borussia Dortmund
Iseka 7' (pen.), 30'; Mikal 50'; Bah 75'; Bourard 90+2'	Report

Van Roy Stadium, Denderleeuw
Attendance: 258
Referee: Michael Johansen (Denmark)

21 October 2014
19:00

Anderlecht (Belgium)	4–3	(England) Arsenal
Iseka 2' (pen.), 23'; Mikal 36'; Kawaya 39'	Report	Crowley 11', 19', 85' (pen.)

Van Roy Stadium, Denderleeuw
Attendance: 534
Referee: Anatoliy Abdula (Ukraine)
22 October 2014
13:00

Galatasaray (Turkey)	3–2	(Germany) Borussia Dortmund
Çalışkan 72'; Köse 74'; Can Davas 89'	Report	Sauerland 11'; Gümüştaş 86'

Esenyurt Incirtepe Stadyumu, Istanbul
Attendance: 1,250
Referee: Aliyar Aghayev (Azerbaijan)

4 November 2014
15:00

Arsenal (England)	1–2	(Belgium) Anderlecht
Crowley 22'	Report	Bastien 5'; Vancamp 74'

Meadow Park, Borehamwood
Attendance: 515
Referee: Paul McLaughlin (Republic of Ireland)
4 November 2014
16:00

Borussia Dortmund (Germany)	5–2	(Turkey) Galatasaray
Flores 14'; Maruoka 48'; El-Bouazzati 58'; Gümüştaş 72', 90+1'	Report	Türkmen 69'; Göksu 80'

Montanhydraulik-Stadion, Holzwickede
Attendance: 509
Referee: Nikola Popov (Bulgaria)

25 November 2014
20:45

Anderlecht (Belgium)	3–0 Awarded (Note: The match was abandoned at the 90+5th minute, with Anderlecht leading 2–0, due to Turkish fans setting off fireworks and throwing objects. UEFA ruled the match as a forfeit by Galatasaray and awarded Anderlecht a 3–0 win.)	(Turkey) Galatasaray
Ademoglu 39'; Iseka 90+5'	Report

Van Roy Stadium, Denderleeuw
Attendance: 594
Referee: Alexander Harkam (Austria)
26 November 2014
15:00

Arsenal (England)	1–0	(Germany) Borussia Dortmund
Mavididi 49'	Report

Meadow Park, Borehamwood
Attendance: 487
Referee: Rob Rogers (Republic of Ireland)

9 December 2014
13:00

Galatasaray (Turkey)	1–3	(England) Arsenal
Çalışkan 8'	Report	Mavididi 40'; Robinson 42'; Eyoma 47'

Esenyurt Necmi Kadıoğlu Stadyumu, Istanbul
Attendance: 570
Referee: Georgi Kabakov (Bulgaria)
10 December 2014
17:00

Borussia Dortmund (Germany)	1–1	(Belgium) Anderlecht
Flores 3'	Report	Mikal 51'

Montanhydraulik-Stadion, Holzwickede
Attendance: 376
Referee: Alexandru Tean (Moldova)

=== Group E ===
Pos	Team	Pld	W	D	L	GF	GA	GD	Pts	Qualification	MCI	ROM	BAY	CSKA
1	(England) Manchester City	6	6	0	0	22	4	+18	18	Advance to knockout phase	—	2–1	6–0	4–2
2	(Italy) Roma	6	3	0	3	9	10	−1	9	Advance to knockout phase	0–4	—	1–0	3–1
3	(Germany) Bayern Munich	6	2	0	4	8	18	−10	6		1–4	3–2	—	3–2
4	(Russia) CSKA Moscow	6	1	0	5	8	15	−7	3		0–2	0–2	3–1	—

Source: UEFA
Rules for classification: Group stage tiebreakers
17 September 2014
14:30

Roma (Italy)	3–1	(Russia) CSKA Moscow
Calabresi 37'; Verde 43'; Adamo 55'	Report	Zhamaletdinov 7'

Stadio Centro d'Italia, Rieti
Attendance: 443
Referee: Alan Mario Sant (Malta)
17 September 2014
14:30

Bayern Munich (Germany)	1–4	(England) Manchester City
Walter 90+2'	Report	Byrne 26'; Pozo 43'; Angeliño 60'; Celina 66'

Stadion an der Grünwalder Straße, Munich
Attendance: 638
Referee: István Kovács (Romania)

30 September 2014
10:00

CSKA Moscow (Russia)	3–1	(Germany) Bayern Munich
Chernov 25' (pen.); Zhamaletdinov 43'; Makarov 90+2'	Report	Scholl 56'

Oktyabr Stadium, Moscow
Attendance: 650
Referee: Kristo Tohver (Estonia)
30 September 2014
15:00

Manchester City (England)	2–1	(Italy) Roma
Ntcham 64'; Ambrose 71'	Report	Di Mariano 54'

Ewen Fields, Hyde
Attendance: 962
Referee: Bojan Pandžić (Sweden)

21 October 2014
11:30

CSKA Moscow (Russia)	0–2	(England) Manchester City
	Report	Pozo 21', 70'

Oktyabr Stadium, Moscow
Attendance: 450
Referee: Lasha Silagava (Georgia)
21 October 2014
12:00

Roma (Italy)	1–0	(Germany) Bayern Munich
Adamo 5'	Report

Campo Agostino Di Bartolomei, Rome
Attendance: 700
Referee: Vasilis Dimitriou (Cyprus)

5 November 2014
14:30

Bayern Munich (Germany)	3–2	(Italy) Roma
Pantović 72'; Hingerl 74'; Calabresi 82' (o.g.)	Report	Sanabria 25', 69'

Stadion an der Grünwalder Straße, Munich
Attendance: 615
Referee: Athanasios Giachos (Greece)
5 November 2014
15:00

Manchester City (England)	4–2	(Russia) CSKA Moscow
Byrne 8'; Barker 33', 75'; Ambrose 90+3'	Report	Golovin 31'; Zhamaletdinov 50'

Ewen Fields, Hyde
Attendance: 1,298
Referee: Jens Maae (Denmark)

25 November 2014
11:30

CSKA Moscow (Russia)	0–2	(Italy) Roma
	Report	Di Livio 77'; Verde 88' (pen.)

Oktyabr Stadium, Moscow
Attendance: 250
Referee: Nerijus Dunauskas (Lithuania)
25 November 2014
16:00

Manchester City (England)	6–0	(Germany) Bayern Munich
Adarabioyo 9'; Barker 25'; Celina 29', 88'; Byrne 64', 80'	Report

Ewen Fields, Hyde
Attendance: 1,462
Referee: Mervyn Smyth (Northern Ireland)

10 December 2014
12:00

Roma (Italy)	0–4	(England) Manchester City
	Report	Celina 71'; Byrne 76'; Ambrose 82'; Barker 90+3'

Campo Agostino Di Bartolomei, Rome
Attendance: 350
Referee: Ján Valášek (Slovakia)
10 December 2014
14:30

Bayern Munich (Germany)	3–2	(Russia) CSKA Moscow
Hingerl 34'; Pantović 54' (pen.); Martinović 56'	Report	Larionov 3'; Kasatkin 68'

Stadion an der Grünwalder Straße, Munich
Attendance: 600
Referee: Radu Petrescu (Romania)

=== Group F ===
Pos	Team	Pld	W	D	L	GF	GA	GD	Pts	Qualification	AJX	BAR	PAR	APO
1	(Netherlands) Ajax	6	4	2	0	19	7	+12	14	Advance to knockout phase	—	1–0	6–1	4–1
2	(Spain) Barcelona	6	2	3	1	10	7	+3	9	Advance to knockout phase	2–2	—	0–0	3–0
3	(France) Paris Saint-Germain	6	2	2	2	15	14	+1	8		3–6	2–2	—	6–0
4	(Cyprus) APOEL	6	0	1	5	3	19	−16	1		0–0	2–3	0–3	—

Source: UEFA
Rules for classification: Group stage tiebreakers
16 September 2014
19:00

Barcelona (Spain)	3–0	(Cyprus) APOEL
Padilla 3'; Moha 3'; J. García 18'	Report

Mini Estadi, Barcelona
Attendance: 1,053
Referee: Bart Vertenten (Belgium)
18 September 2014
15:30

Ajax (Netherlands)	6–1	(France) Paris Saint-Germain
Van de Beek 16', 55', 62'; El Idrissi 31', 40'; Riedewald 86' (pen.)	Report	Demoncy 73'

Sportpark De Toekomst, Ouder-Amstel
Attendance: 400
Referee: Zbynek Proske (Czech Republic)

30 September 2014
15:00

APOEL (Cyprus)	0–0	(Netherlands) Ajax
	Report

GSZ Stadium, Larnaca
Attendance: 937
Referee: Roi Reinshreiber (Israel)
30 September 2014
16:00

Paris Saint-Germain (France)	2–2	(Spain) Barcelona
Meïté 19'; Augustin 59'	Report	Enguene 66'; Moha 90+8' (pen.)

Stade Charléty, Paris
Attendance: 340
Referee: Antti Munukka (Finland)

21 October 2014
16:00

Barcelona (Spain)	2–2	(Netherlands) Ajax
Enguene 73'; Carbonell 79'	Report	El Idrissi 3'; Van Bruggen 34' (pen.)

Mini Estadi, Barcelona
Attendance: 954
Referee: Bartosz Frankowski (Poland)
22 October 2014
15:00

APOEL (Cyprus)	0–3	(France) Paris Saint-Germain
	Report	Sanogo 19', 81'; Labissière 87'

GSZ Stadium, Larnaca
Attendance: 350
Referee: Jovan Kaludjerović (Montenegro)

4 November 2014
19:00

Ajax (Netherlands)	1–0	(Spain) Barcelona
Černý 60'	Report

Sportpark De Toekomst, Ouder-Amstel
Attendance: 3,482
Referee: Vladimir Vnuk (Slovakia)
5 November 2014
15:00

Paris Saint-Germain (France)	6–0	(Cyprus) APOEL
Meïté 7', 89'; Krasniqi 42'; Augustin 49' (pen.), 52'; Nkunku 77'	Report

Stade Georges-Lefèvre, Saint-Germain-en-Laye
Attendance: 312
Referee: Ville Nevalainen (Finland)

25 November 2014
15:00

APOEL (Cyprus)	2–3	(Spain) Barcelona
G. Christodoulou 27'; Kallis 41'	Report	Padilla 19'; Natkho 76'; Corredera 82'

GSZ Stadium, Larnaca
Attendance: 460
Referee: Orel Grinfeld (Israel)
26 November 2014
15:00

Paris Saint-Germain (France)	3–6	(Netherlands) Ajax
Meïté 49'; Augustin 56'; Goncalves 69'	Report	Černý 25'; El Azzouzi 34', 51', 63', 89'; Nouri 54'

Stade Charléty, Paris
Attendance: 497
Referee: Erik Lambrechts (Belgium)

9 December 2014
18:30

Ajax (Netherlands)	4–1	(Cyprus) APOEL
Van de Beek 7'; El Azzouzi 43', 55'; Nouri 51'	Report	D. Charalambous 21'

Sportpark De Toekomst, Ouder-Amstel
Attendance: 1,000
Referee: Yuriy Mozharovskyy (Ukraine)
9 December 2014
20:00

Barcelona (Spain)	0–0	(France) Paris Saint-Germain
	Report

Mini Estadi, Barcelona
Attendance: 604
Referee: Stephan Klossner (Switzerland)

=== Group G ===
Pos	Team	Pld	W	D	L	GF	GA	GD	Pts	Qualification	CHE	SCH	SPO	MRB
1	(England) Chelsea	6	5	0	1	24	3	+21	15	Advance to knockout phase	—	4–1	6–0	2–0
2	(Germany) Schalke 04	6	5	0	1	19	7	+12	15	Advance to knockout phase	2–0	—	3–0	5–0
3	(Portugal) Sporting CP	6	2	0	4	8	20	−12	6		0–5	2–3	—	3–2
4	(Slovenia) Maribor	6	0	0	6	4	25	−21	0		0–7	1–5	1–3	—

Source: UEFA
Rules for classification: Group stage tiebreakers
17 September 2014
13:30

Maribor (Slovenia)	1–3	(Portugal) Sporting CP
Lorbek 80' (pen.)	Report	Postiga 30'; Zé Turbo 76'; Elói 90+2'

Mestni Stadion Ptuj, Ptuj
Attendance: 1,500
Referee: Edin Jakupović (Bosnia and Herzegovina)
17 September 2014
14:05

Chelsea (England)	4–1	(Germany) Schalke 04
Brown 9', 55'; Solanke 30'; Aina 67'	Report	Multhaup 14'

Cobham Training Centre, Stoke d'Abernon
Attendance: 100
Referee: Alain Bieri (Switzerland)

30 September 2014
14:00

Schalke 04 (Germany)	5–0	(Slovenia) Maribor
Multhaup 20'; Boyamba 26', 41'; Platte 69', 83'	Report

Stimbergstadion, Oer-Erkenschwick
Attendance: 380
Referee: Mikhail Vilkov (Russia)
30 September 2014
16:00

Sporting CP (Portugal)	0–5	(England) Chelsea
	Report	Colkett 3' (pen.); Musonda 8'; Abraham 25', 46'; Solanke 27'

CGD Stadium Aurélio Pereira, Alcochete
Attendance: 417
Referee: Jens Maae (Denmark)

21 October 2014
14:00

Schalke 04 (Germany)	3–0	(Portugal) Sporting CP
Schröter 4'; Sané 28'; Lohmar 87'	Report

Stimbergstadion, Oer-Erkenschwick
Attendance: 350
Referee: Barış Şimşek (Turkey)
21 October 2014
14:05

Chelsea (England)	2–0	(Slovenia) Maribor
Boga 13', 45'	Report

Cobham Training Centre, Stoke d'Abernon
Attendance: 100
Referee: Bryn Markham-Jones (Wales)

5 November 2014
13:00

Maribor (Slovenia)	0–7	(England) Chelsea
	Report	Solanke 6', 40'; Colkett 11' (pen.), 36'; Musonda 25'; Kiwomya 81'; Abraham 90+3'

Športni park, Lendava
Attendance: 1,200
Referee: Nikolay Yordanov (Bulgaria)
5 November 2014
15:00

Sporting CP (Portugal)	2–3	(Germany) Schalke 04
Djaló 5'; Postiga 45'	Report	Sané 53', 90+1'; Platte 65'

CGD Stadium Aurélio Pereira, Alcochete
Attendance: 237
Referee: Nikolaj Hänni (Switzerland)

25 November 2014
12:00

Sporting CP (Portugal)	3–2	(Slovenia) Maribor
Zé Turbo 20', 34'; Elói 65'	Report	Kramarič 14', 43'

CGD Stadium Aurélio Pereira, Alcochete
Attendance: 112
Referee: Benoît Millot (France)
25 November 2014
13:30

Schalke 04 (Germany)	2–0	(England) Chelsea
Multhaup 61', 76'	Report

Stimbergstadion, Oer-Erkenschwick
Attendance: 450
Referee: Petr Ardeleanu (Czech Republic)

10 December 2014
13:00

Maribor (Slovenia)	1–5	(Germany) Schalke 04
Karič 85'	Report	Schröter 39', 57'; Čorić 41', 48'; Platte 78'

Športni park, Lendava
Attendance: 650
Referee: Domagoj Vučkov (Croatia)
10 December 2014
14:05

Chelsea (England)	6–0	(Portugal) Sporting CP
Boga 18', 45'; Solanke 23', 56', 71'; Musonda 79'	Report

Cobham Training Centre, Stoke d'Abernon
Attendance: 127
Referee: Padraig Sutton (Republic of Ireland)

=== Group H ===
Pos	Team	Pld	W	D	L	GF	GA	GD	Pts	Qualification	SHK	POR	ATH	BATE
1	(Ukraine) Shakhtar Donetsk	6	4	2	0	15	3	+12	14	Advance to knockout phase	—	1–1	6–0	1–0
2	(Portugal) Porto	6	2	3	1	7	5	+2	9	Advance to knockout phase	1–1	—	2–0	2–0
3	(Spain) Athletic Bilbao	6	3	0	3	9	12	−3	9		0–2	3–1	—	4–0
4	(Belarus) BATE Borisov	6	0	1	5	2	13	−11	1		1–4	0–0	1–2	—

Source: UEFA
Rules for classification: Group stage tiebreakers
17 September 2014
12:00

Porto (Portugal)	2–0	(Belarus) BATE Borisov
Macedo 19' (pen.); Leonardo 76' (pen.)	Report

CTFD PortoGaia, Vila Nova de Gaia
Attendance: 295
Referee: Chris Reisch (Luxembourg)
17 September 2014
12:00

Athletic Bilbao (Spain)	0–2	(Ukraine) Shakhtar Donetsk
	Report	Zubkov 25'; Shtander 61'

Instalaciones de Lezama, Lezama
Attendance: 1,500
Referee: Manuel Schuettengruber (Austria)

30 September 2014
14:00

Shakhtar Donetsk (Ukraine)	1–1	(Portugal) Porto
Vachiberadze 2' (pen.)	Report	Rui Pedro 16' (pen.)

Medyk Stadium, Morshyn
Attendance: 812
Referee: Marius Avram (Romania)
30 September 2014
15:00

BATE Borisov (Belarus)	1–2	(Spain) Athletic Bilbao
Tsishko 70'	Report	Guruzeta 33'; Villalibre 87'

Haradski Stadium, Barysaw
Attendance: 3,583
Referee: Yaroslav Kozyk (Ukraine)

21 October 2014
12:00

Porto (Portugal)	2–0	(Spain) Athletic Bilbao
Leonardo 39'; Costa 80'	Report

CTFD PortoGaia, Vila Nova de Gaia
Attendance: 574
Referee: Alexandre Boucaut (Belgium)
21 October 2014
15:00

BATE Borisov (Belarus)	1–4	(Ukraine) Shakhtar Donetsk
Dzhigero 34'	Report	Zubkov 29', 86'; Shtander 31'; Arendaruk 55'

Haradski Stadium, Barysaw
Attendance: 450
Referee: Alexandr Aliyev (Kazakhstan)

5 November 2014
12:00

Athletic Bilbao (Spain)	3–1	(Portugal) Porto
Villalibre 57'; Vicente 68' (pen.), 70'	Report	Leonardo 21' (pen.)

Campo de Lasesarre, Barakaldo
Attendance: 1,600
Referee: Thoroddur Hjaltalin (Iceland)
5 November 2014
13:00

Shakhtar Donetsk (Ukraine)	1–0	(Belarus) BATE Borisov
Vachiberadze 37'	Report

Medyk Stadium, Morshyn
Attendance: 802
Referee: Sándor Andó-Szabó (Hungary)

25 November 2014
13:00

BATE Borisov (Belarus)	0–0	(Portugal) Porto
	Report

Haradski Stadium, Barysaw
Attendance: 100
Referee: Vadims Direktorenko (Latvia)
25 November 2014
13:00

Shakhtar Donetsk (Ukraine)	6–0	(Spain) Athletic Bilbao
Matviyenko 7'; Boryachuk 9', 65'; Shtander 18'; Kovalenko 44'; Sahutkin 81'	Report

Medyk Stadium, Morshyn
Attendance: 650
Referee: Rahim Hasanov (Azerbaijan)

10 December 2014
12:00

Porto (Portugal)	1–1	(Ukraine) Shakhtar Donetsk
Leonardo 90+4' (pen.)	Report	Boryachuk 47'

CTFD PortoGaia, Vila Nova de Gaia
Attendance: 239
Referee: Anders Poulsen (Denmark)
10 December 2014
12:00

Athletic Bilbao (Spain)	4–0	(Belarus) BATE Borisov
Cordoba 74' (pen.); Vicente 79'; Parra 86'; Garai 89'	Report

Campo de Lasesarre, Barakaldo
Attendance: 1,300
Referee: Tihomir Pejin (Croatia)
