= 2014–15 UEFA Youth League knockout phase =

European football tournament

The 2014–15 UEFA Youth League knockout phase began on 27 January with the round of 16 and concluded with the final on 13 April 2015 at Colovray Stadium in Nyon, Switzerland, to decide the champions of the 2014–15 UEFA Youth League.

Times are CET/CEST, (Note: CET (UTC+1) for dates up to 28 March 2015 (up to quarter-finals), and CEST (UTC+2) for dates thereafter (semi-finals and final).) as listed by UEFA.

== Qualified teams ==
| Group | Winners (seeded in round of 16 draw) | Runners-up (unseeded in round of 16 draw) |
|---|---|---|
| A | (Spain) Atlético Madrid | (Greece) Olympiacos |
| B | (Spain) Real Madrid | (England) Liverpool |
| C | (Portugal) Benfica | (Russia) Zenit Saint Petersburg |
| D | (Belgium) Anderlecht | (England) Arsenal |
| E | (England) Manchester City | (Italy) Roma |
| F | (Netherlands) Ajax | (Spain) Barcelona |
| G | (England) Chelsea | (Germany) Schalke 04 |
| H | (Ukraine) Shakhtar Donetsk | (Portugal) Porto |

== Format ==
Each tie in the knockout phase was played as a single match. If the score was level at the end of normal time, a penalty shoot-out was used to determine the winner (no extra time was played). The mechanism of the draws for each round was as follows:

- In the draw for the round of 16, the eight group winners were seeded, and the eight group runners-up were unseeded. The seeded teams were drawn against the unseeded teams, with the seeded teams hosting the match. Teams from the same group or the same association could not be drawn against each other.
- In the draws for the quarter-finals onwards, there were no seedings, and teams from the same group or the same association could be drawn against each other. The draw also decided the home team for each quarter-final, and the "home" team for administrative purposes for each semi-final and final (which were played on neutral ground).

== Schedule ==
The schedule was as follows.

| Round | Draw date | Match date(s) |
|---|---|---|
| Round of 16 | 15 December 2014 | 17–18 & 24–25 February 2015 |
| Quarter-finals | 15 December 2014 | 10–11 & 17–18 March 2015 |
| Semi-finals | 15 December 2014 | 10 April 2015 at Colovray Stadium, Nyon |
| Final | 15 December 2014 | 13 April 2015 at Colovray Stadium, Nyon |

== Bracket ==
The draw for the knockout phase was held on 15 December 2014, 14:00 CET, at UEFA headquarters in Nyon, Switzerland. On 17 July 2014, the UEFA emergency panel ruled that Ukrainian and Russian clubs would not be drawn against each other "until further notice" due to the political unrest between the countries. Therefore, Ukrainian club Shakhtar Donetsk and Russian club Zenit Saint Petersburg could not be drawn against each other in the round of 16. The winners of the ties involving these two clubs could also not be drawn against each other in the quarter-finals.

Round of 16
(Belgium) Anderlecht | 1
(Spain) Barcelona | 0
(Spain) Real Madrid | 1 (1)
(Portugal) Porto (p) | 1 (3)
(Portugal) Benfica | 2
(England) Liverpool | 1
(Ukraine) Shakhtar Donetsk (p) | 1 (5)
(Greece) Olympiacos | 1 (4)
(Netherlands) Ajax | 0 (5)
(Italy) Roma (p) | 0 (6)
(England) Manchester City (p) | 1 (3)
(Germany) Schalke 04 | 1 (1)
(England) Chelsea | 3
(Russia) Zenit Saint Petersburg | 1
(Spain) Atlético Madrid | 1
(England) Arsenal | 0

Quarter-finals
(Belgium) Anderlecht | 5
(Portugal) Porto | 0
(Portugal) Benfica | 1 (4)
(Ukraine) Shakhtar Donetsk (p) | 1 (5)
(Italy) Roma | 2
(England) Manchester City | 1
(England) Chelsea | 2
(Spain) Atlético Madrid | 0

Semi-finals
10 April – Nyon
(Belgium) Anderlecht | 1
(Ukraine) Shakhtar Donetsk | 3
10 April – Nyon
(Italy) Roma | 0
(England) Chelsea | 4

Final
13 April – Nyon
(Ukraine) Shakhtar Donetsk | 2
(England) Chelsea | 3

== Round of 16 ==
=== Summary ===
The round of 16 matches were played on 27 January, 17, 23, 24 and 25 February 2015.

| Home team | Score | Away team |
|---|---|---|
| Atlético Madrid (Spain) | 1–0 | (England) Arsenal |
| Real Madrid (Spain) | 1–1 (1–3 p) | (Portugal) Porto |
| Shakhtar Donetsk (Ukraine) | 1–1 (5–4 p) | (Greece) Olympiacos |
| Anderlecht (Belgium) | 1–0 | (Spain) Barcelona |
| Benfica (Portugal) | 2–1 | (England) Liverpool |
| Manchester City (England) | 1–1 (3–1 p) | (Germany) Schalke 04 |
| Ajax (Netherlands) | 0–0 (5–6 p) | (Italy) Roma |
| Chelsea (England) | 3–1 | (Russia) Zenit Saint Petersburg |

=== Matches ===
27 January 2015
19:00

| Atlético Madrid (Spain) | 1–0 | (England) Arsenal |
|---|---|---|
| Diedhiou 1' | Report |

Ciudad Deportiva Cerro Del Espino, Majadahonda
Attendance: 902
Referee: Hugo Miguel (Portugal)

17 February 2015
18:00

| Real Madrid (Spain) | 1–1 | (Portugal) Porto |
|---|---|---|
| Mayoral 60' | Report | Leonardo 81' (pen.) |
Penalties
| Cedrés (penalty missed); Mayoral (penalty scored); Febas (penalty missed); Lienhart (penalty missed) | 1–3 | (penalty scored) Johansen; (penalty scored) Cardoso; (penalty scored) Leonardo |

Alfredo di Stéfano, Madrid
Attendance: 660
Referee: Adrien Jaccottet (Switzerland)

23 February 2015
11:00

| Shakhtar Donetsk (Ukraine) | 1–1 | (Greece) Olympiacos |
|---|---|---|
| Vachiberadze 27' (pen.) | Report | Vergos 12' |
Penalties
| Zubkov (penalty scored); Boryachuk (penalty scored); Shtander (penalty scored); Kovalenko (penalty scored); Vachiberadze (penalty missed); Arendaruk (penalty scored) | 5–4 | (penalty scored) Vergos; (penalty scored) Vatousiadis; (penalty scored) Saliakas; (penalty scored) Laçi; (penalty missed) Ignatidis; (penalty missed) Toli |

FFU Training Complex, Kyiv
Attendance: 918
Referee: Andris Treimanis (Latvia)

23 February 2015
20:00

| Anderlecht (Belgium) | 1–0 | (Spain) Barcelona |
|---|---|---|
| Iseka 53' | Report |

Constant Vanden Stock Stadium, Brussels
Attendance: 12,871
Referee: Jakob Kehlet (Denmark)

24 February 2015
16:00

| Benfica (Portugal) | 2–1 | (England) Liverpool |
|---|---|---|
| Pereira 6'; Gonçalves 75' | Report | Canós 9' |

Caixa Futebol Campus, Seixal
Attendance: 1,230
Referee: Benoît Millot (France)

24 February 2015
17:00

| Manchester City (England) | 1–1 | (Germany) Schalke 04 |
|---|---|---|
| Byrne 33' | Report | Sivodedov 90+1' |
Penalties
| Byrne (penalty scored); Celina (penalty scored); Pozo (penalty scored); Angeliño (penalty missed) | 3–1 | (penalty missed) Multhaup; (penalty missed) Neubauer; (penalty scored) Sané; (penalty missed) Sivodedov |

Academy Stadium, Manchester
Attendance: 1,545
Referee: Svein-Erik Edvartsen (Norway)

24 February 2015
18:30

| Ajax (Netherlands) | 0–0 | (Italy) Roma |
|---|---|---|
| | Report |
Penalties
| Murić (penalty scored); Dankerlui (penalty scored); El Azzouzi (penalty scored); El Mahdioui (penalty scored); Van De Beek (penalty scored); Eiting (penalty missed) | 5–6 | (penalty scored) Vestenický; (penalty scored) Marchizza; (penalty scored) Di Mariano; (penalty scored) Adamo; (penalty scored) Pellegrini; (penalty scored) Paolelli |

Sportpark De Toekomst, Ouder-Amstel
Attendance: 4,433
Referee: Alexander Harkam (Austria)

25 February 2015
20:00

| Chelsea (England) | 3–1 | (Russia) Zenit Saint Petersburg |
|---|---|---|
| Solanke 21'; Palmer 49'; Colkett 72' (pen.) | Report | Kubyshkin 13' |

EBB Stadium, Aldershot
Attendance: 387
Referee: Kevin Clancy (Scotland)

== Quarter-finals ==
=== Summary ===
The quarter-finals were played on 10, 17 and 18 March 2015.

| Home team | Score | Away team |
|---|---|---|
| Chelsea (England) | 2–0 | (Spain) Atlético Madrid |
| Benfica (Portugal) | 1–1 (4–5 p) | (Ukraine) Shakhtar Donetsk |
| Roma (Italy) | 2–1 | (England) Manchester City |
| Anderlecht (Belgium) | 5–0 | (Portugal) Porto |

=== Matches ===
10 March 2015
16:00

| Chelsea (England) | 2–0 | (Spain) Atlético Madrid |
|---|---|---|
| Manzanara 38' (o.g.); Solanke 89' | Report |

Cobham Training Centre, Stoke d'Abernon
Attendance: 628
Referee: Andreas Ekberg (Sweden)

17 March 2015
17:00

| Benfica (Portugal) | 1–1 | (Ukraine) Shakhtar Donetsk |
|---|---|---|
| Carvalho 42' | Report | Shtander 64' |
Penalties
| Gonçalves (penalty missed); Dias (penalty scored); Sanches (penalty scored); Carvalho (penalty scored); Rodrigues (penalty scored) | 4–5 | (penalty scored) Zubkov; (penalty scored) Boryachuk; (penalty scored) Shtander; (penalty scored) Arendaruk; (penalty scored) Vachiberadze |

Caixa Futebol Campus, Seixal
Attendance: 1,320
Referee: Bastian Dankert (Germany)

17 March 2015
18:00

| Roma (Italy) | 2–1 | (England) Manchester City |
|---|---|---|
| Vestenický 62'; Pellegrini 86' | Report | Ambrose 90+1' (pen.) |

Stadio Domenico Francioni, Latina
Attendance: 4,200
Referee: Paweł Raczkowski (Poland)

18 March 2015
19:00

| Anderlecht (Belgium) | 5–0 | (Portugal) Porto |
|---|---|---|
| Iseka 4', 16' (pen.), 55' (pen.); Bourard 25'; Lumor 62' (o.g.) | Report |

Constant Vanden Stock Stadium, Brussels
Attendance: 13,162
Referee: Nicolas Rainville (France)

== Semi-finals ==
=== Summary ===
The semi-finals were played on 10 April 2015 at the Colovray Stadium in Nyon, Switzerland.

| Team 1 | Score | Team 2 |
|---|---|---|
| Anderlecht (Belgium) | 1–3 | (Ukraine) Shakhtar Donetsk |
| Roma (Italy) | 0–4 | (England) Chelsea |

=== Matches ===
10 April 2015
13:00

| Anderlecht (Belgium) | 1–3 | (Ukraine) Shakhtar Donetsk |
|---|---|---|
| Bourard 55' | Report | Kovalenko 76', 87'; Arendaruk 80' |

Colovray Stadium, Nyon
Attendance: 3,000
Referee: Eitan Shemeulevitch (Israel)

10 April 2015
17:15

| Roma (Italy) | 0–4 | (England) Chelsea |
|---|---|---|
| | Report | Colkett 47'; Solanke 49', 56'; Abraham 83' |

Colovray Stadium, Nyon
Attendance: 4,000
Referee: Jesús Gil Manzano (Spain)

== Final ==
The final was played on 13 April 2015 at the Colovray Stadium in Nyon, Switzerland.

13 April 2015
16:00

| Shakhtar Donetsk (Ukraine) | 2–3 | (England) Chelsea |
|---|---|---|
| Christensen 37' (o.g.); Kovalenko 90+2' | Report | Brown 7', 55'; Solanke 47' |

Colovray Stadium, Nyon
Attendance: 4,000
Referee: Serdar Gözübüyük (Netherlands)
