= 2014–15 UEFA Youth League =

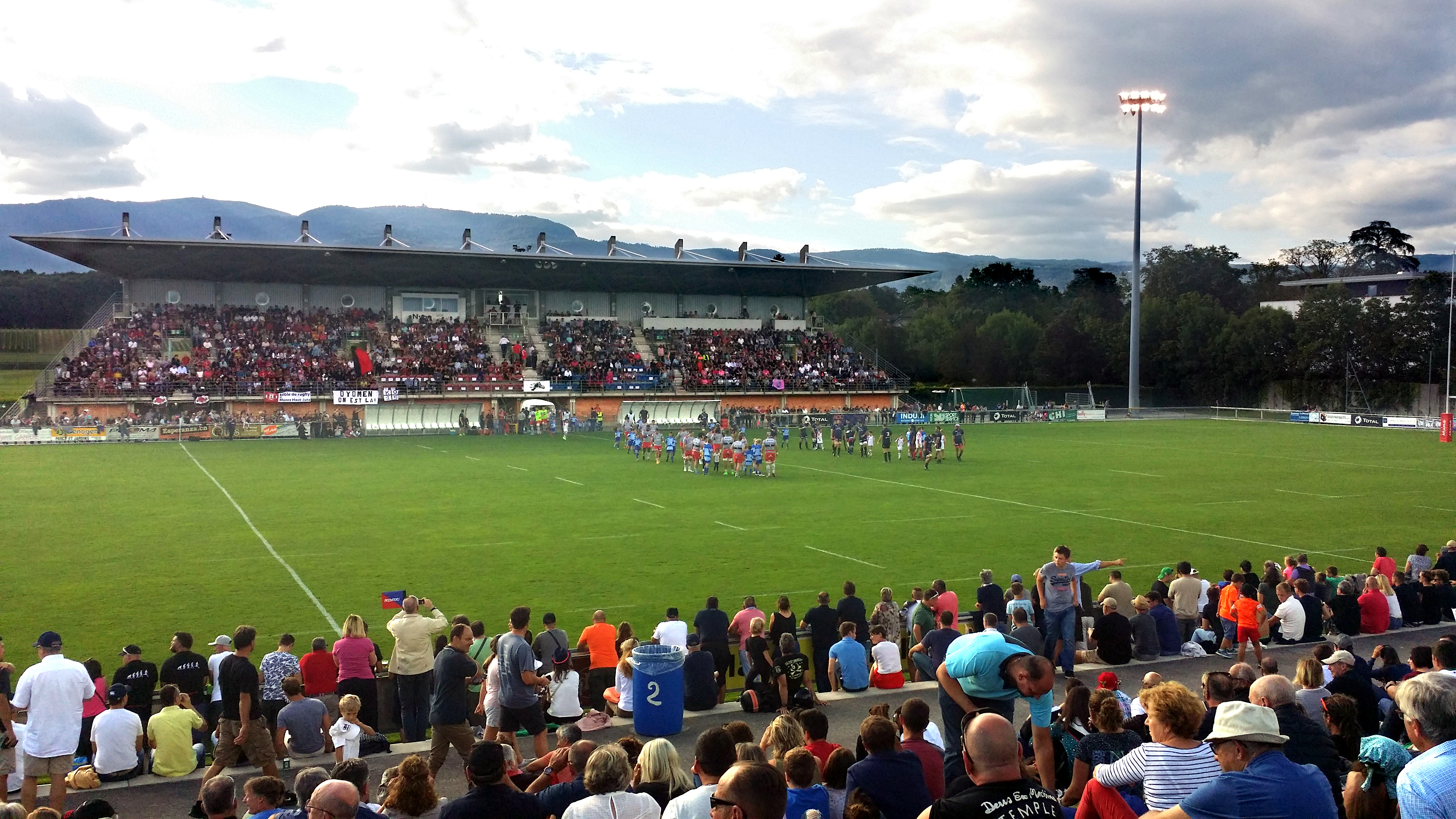
- The Colovray Stadium in Nyon hosted the semi-finals and final.

Tournament details
- Dates: 16 September 2014 – 13 April 2015
- Teams: 32 (from 18 associations)

Final positions
- Champions: (England) Chelsea (1st title)
- Runners-up: (Ukraine) Shakhtar Donetsk

Tournament statistics
- Matches played: 111
- Goals scored: 397 (3.58 per match)
- Top scorer(s): (England) Dominic Solanke (Chelsea); 12 goals

The 2014–15 UEFA Youth League was the second season of the UEFA Youth League, a European youth club football competition organised by UEFA. It was contested by the under-19 youth teams of the 32 clubs qualified for the group stage of the 2014–15 UEFA Champions League.

The final was played on 13 April 2015 at the Colovray Stadium in Nyon, Switzerland, between Shakhtar Donetsk and Chelsea. Chelsea won 3–2 and secured their first title in the competition. Barcelona were the title holders, but were eliminated by Anderlecht in the round of 16.

Players must be born on or after 1 January 1996.

== Teams ==
The youth teams of the 32 clubs which participated in the 2014–15 UEFA Champions League group stage entered the competition.

Association	Teams
Spain	Real Madrid; Atlético Madrid; Barcelona; Athletic Bilbao
England	Manchester City; Liverpool; Chelsea; Arsenal
Germany	Bayern Munich; Borussia Dortmund; Schalke 04; Bayer Leverkusen
Italy	Juventus; Roma
Portugal	Benfica; Sporting CP; Porto
France	Paris Saint-Germain; Monaco
Ukraine	Shakhtar Donetsk
Russia	CSKA Moscow; Zenit Saint Petersburg
Netherlands	Ajax
Turkey	Galatasaray
Belgium	Anderlecht
Greece	Olympiacos
Switzerland	Basel
Cyprus	APOEL
Belarus	BATE Borisov
Sweden	Malmö FF
Bulgaria	Ludogorets Razgrad
Slovenia	Maribor

Notes

1. ^{TH} Title holders

== Round and draw dates ==
The schedule of the competition was as follows. However, matches in the round of 16 and quarter-finals could be played outside of the scheduled dates.

Phase	Round	Draw date	Match date(s)
Group stage	Matchday 1	28 August 2014 (Monaco)	16–18 September 2014
Group stage	Matchday 2	28 August 2014 (Monaco)	30 September–2 October 2014
Group stage	Matchday 3	28 August 2014 (Monaco)	21–23 October 2014
Group stage	Matchday 4	28 August 2014 (Monaco)	4–6 November 2014
Group stage	Matchday 5	28 August 2014 (Monaco)	25–27 November 2014
Group stage	Matchday 6	28 August 2014 (Monaco)	9–11 December 2014
Knockout phase	Round of 16	15 December 2014 (Nyon)	17–18 & 24–25 February 2015
Knockout phase	Quarter-finals	15 December 2014 (Nyon)	10–11 & 17–18 March 2015
Knockout phase	Semi-finals	15 December 2014 (Nyon)	10 April 2015 at Colovray Stadium, Nyon
Knockout phase	Final	15 December 2014 (Nyon)	13 April 2015 at Colovray Stadium, Nyon

On 23 September 2014, UEFA announced a change to the schedule of the semi-finals and finals, which were originally due to take place on 24 and 27 April respectively.

== Group stage ==
Location of teams of the 2014–15 UEFA Youth League.
Brown: Group A; Red: Group B; Orange: Group C; Yellow: Group D; Green: Group E; Blue: Group F; Purple: Group G; Pink: Group H.

The 32 teams were drawn into eight groups of four, with the group compositions being the same as in the draw for the 2014–15 UEFA Champions League group stage, which was held on 28 August 2014, 17:45 CEST, at the Grimaldi Forum in Monaco.

In each group, teams played against each other home-and-away in a round-robin format. The matchdays were 16–18 September, 30 September–2 October, 21–23 October, 4–6 November, 25–27 November, and 9–11 December 2014, with the matches played on the same matchday as the corresponding Champions League matches, but not necessarily on the same day. The group winners and runners-up advanced to the round of 16.

=== Group A ===
Pos	Team	Pld	W	D	L	GF	GA	GD	Pts	Qualification	ATM	OLY	JUV	MAL
1	(Spain) Atlético Madrid	6	5	0	1	11	5	+6	15	Advance to knockout phase	—	0–2	1–0	3–1
2	(Greece) Olympiacos	6	4	1	1	12	4	+8	13	Advance to knockout phase	1–2	—	1–1	2–0
3	(Italy) Juventus	6	1	2	3	5	10	−5	5		0–3	0–3	—	2–0
4	(Sweden) Malmö FF	6	0	1	5	5	14	−9	1		1–2	1–3	2–2	—

Source: UEFA

=== Group B ===
Pos	Team	Pld	W	D	L	GF	GA	GD	Pts	Qualification	RMA	LIV	BSL	LUD
1	(Spain) Real Madrid	6	4	0	2	19	7	+12	12	Advance to knockout phase	—	4–1	2–0	6–0
2	(England) Liverpool	6	4	0	2	16	9	+7	12	Advance to knockout phase	3–2	—	3–0	4–0
3	(Switzerland) Basel	6	4	0	2	17	9	+8	12		3–2	3–2	—	6–0
4	(Bulgaria) Ludogorets Razgrad	6	0	0	6	0	27	−27	0		0–3	0–3	0–5	—

Source: UEFA

=== Group C ===
Pos	Team	Pld	W	D	L	GF	GA	GD	Pts	Qualification	BEN	ZEN	LEV	MON
1	(Portugal) Benfica	6	4	1	1	12	8	+4	13	Advance to knockout phase	—	0–0	4–1	3–0
2	(Russia) Zenit Saint Petersburg	6	3	1	2	12	9	+3	10	Advance to knockout phase	5–1	—	0–3	0–3
3	(Germany) Bayer Leverkusen	6	2	0	4	12	14	−2	6		2–3	1–4	—	4–0
4	(France) Monaco	6	2	0	4	7	12	−5	6		0–1	1–3	3–1	—

Source: UEFA

=== Group D ===
Pos	Team	Pld	W	D	L	GF	GA	GD	Pts	Qualification	AND	ARS	GAL	DOR
1	(Belgium) Anderlecht	6	4	1	1	15	8	+7	13	Advance to knockout phase	—	4–3	3–0 (Note: The match was awarded as a 3–0 win for Anderlecht after the match was abandoned in the 90+5th minute (with Anderlecht leading 2–0) due to crowd disturbances by Galatasaray supporters.)	5–0
2	(England) Arsenal	6	4	0	2	15	8	+7	12	Advance to knockout phase	1–2	—	5–1	1–0
3	(Turkey) Galatasaray	6	2	0	4	10	18	−8	6		3–0	1–3	—	3–2
4	(Germany) Borussia Dortmund	6	1	1	4	8	14	−6	4		1–1	0–2	5–2	—

Source: UEFA

=== Group E ===
Pos	Team	Pld	W	D	L	GF	GA	GD	Pts	Qualification	MCI	ROM	BAY	CSKA
1	(England) Manchester City	6	6	0	0	22	4	+18	18	Advance to knockout phase	—	2–1	6–0	4–2
2	(Italy) Roma	6	3	0	3	9	10	−1	9	Advance to knockout phase	0–4	—	1–0	3–1
3	(Germany) Bayern Munich	6	2	0	4	8	18	−10	6		1–4	3–2	—	3–2
4	(Russia) CSKA Moscow	6	1	0	5	8	15	−7	3		0–2	0–2	3–1	—

Source: UEFA

=== Group F ===
Pos	Team	Pld	W	D	L	GF	GA	GD	Pts	Qualification	AJX	BAR	PAR	APO
1	(Netherlands) Ajax	6	4	2	0	19	7	+12	14	Advance to knockout phase	—	1–0	6–1	4–1
2	(Spain) Barcelona	6	2	3	1	10	7	+3	9	Advance to knockout phase	2–2	—	0–0	3–0
3	(France) Paris Saint-Germain	6	2	2	2	15	14	+1	8		3–6	2–2	—	6–0
4	(Cyprus) APOEL	6	0	1	5	3	19	−16	1		0–0	2–3	0–3	—

Source: UEFA

=== Group G ===
Pos	Team	Pld	W	D	L	GF	GA	GD	Pts	Qualification	CHE	SCH	SPO	MRB
1	(England) Chelsea	6	5	0	1	24	3	+21	15	Advance to knockout phase	—	4–1	6–0	2–0
2	(Germany) Schalke 04	6	5	0	1	19	7	+12	15	Advance to knockout phase	2–0	—	3–0	5–0
3	(Portugal) Sporting CP	6	2	0	4	8	20	−12	6		0–5	2–3	—	3–2
4	(Slovenia) Maribor	6	0	0	6	4	25	−21	0		0–7	1–5	1–3	—

Source: UEFA

=== Group H ===
Pos	Team	Pld	W	D	L	GF	GA	GD	Pts	Qualification	SHK	POR	ATH	BATE
1	(Ukraine) Shakhtar Donetsk	6	4	2	0	15	3	+12	14	Advance to knockout phase	—	1–1	6–0	1–0
2	(Portugal) Porto	6	2	3	1	7	5	+2	9	Advance to knockout phase	1–1	—	2–0	2–0
3	(Spain) Athletic Bilbao	6	3	0	3	9	12	−3	9		0–2	3–1	—	4–0
4	(Belarus) BATE Borisov	6	0	1	5	2	13	−11	1		1–4	0–0	1–2	—

Source: UEFA

== Knockout phase ==
In the knockout phase, teams played against each other over one match. If scores were level after full-time, the match was decided by penalty shoot-out (no extra time was played). The mechanism of the draws for each round was as follows:

- In the draw for the round of 16, the eight group winners were seeded, and the eight group runners-up were unseeded. The seeded teams were drawn against the unseeded teams, with the seeded teams hosting the match. Teams from the same group or the same association could not be drawn against each other.
- In the draws for the quarter-finals onwards, there were no seedings, and teams from the same group or the same association could be drawn against each other. The draw also decided the home team for each quarter-final, and the "home" team for administrative purposes for each semi-final and final (which were played on neutral ground).

=== Bracket ===
The draw for the knockout phase was held on 15 December 2014, 14:00 CET, at UEFA headquarters in Nyon, Switzerland. On 17 July 2014, the UEFA emergency panel ruled that Ukrainian and Russian clubs would not be drawn against each other "until further notice" due to the political unrest between the countries. Therefore, Ukrainian club Shakhtar Donetsk and Russian club Zenit Saint Petersburg could not be drawn against each other in the round of 16. The winners of the ties involving these two clubs could also not be drawn against each other in the quarter-finals.

Round of 16
(Belgium) Anderlecht	1
(Spain) Barcelona	0
(Spain) Real Madrid	1 (1)
(Portugal) Porto (p)	1 (3)
(Portugal) Benfica	2
(England) Liverpool	1
(Ukraine) Shakhtar Donetsk (p)	1 (5)
(Greece) Olympiacos	1 (4)
(Netherlands) Ajax	0 (5)
(Italy) Roma (p)	0 (6)
(England) Manchester City (p)	1 (3)
(Germany) Schalke 04	1 (1)
(England) Chelsea	3
(Russia) Zenit Saint Petersburg	1
(Spain) Atlético Madrid	1
(England) Arsenal	0

Quarter-finals
(Belgium) Anderlecht	5
(Portugal) Porto	0
(Portugal) Benfica	1 (4)
(Ukraine) Shakhtar Donetsk (p)	1 (5)
(Italy) Roma	2
(England) Manchester City	1
(England) Chelsea	2
(Spain) Atlético Madrid	0

Semi-finals
10 April – Nyon
(Belgium) Anderlecht	1
(Ukraine) Shakhtar Donetsk	3
10 April – Nyon
(Italy) Roma	0
(England) Chelsea	4

Final
13 April – Nyon
(Ukraine) Shakhtar Donetsk	2
(England) Chelsea	3

=== Round of 16 ===
The round of 16 matches were played on 27 January, 17, 23, 24 and 25 February 2015.

Home team	Score	Away team
Atlético Madrid (Spain)	1–0	(England) Arsenal
Real Madrid (Spain)	1–1 (1–3 p)	(Portugal) Porto
Shakhtar Donetsk (Ukraine)	1–1 (5–4 p)	(Greece) Olympiacos
Anderlecht (Belgium)	1–0	(Spain) Barcelona
Benfica (Portugal)	2–1	(England) Liverpool
Manchester City (England)	1–1 (3–1 p)	(Germany) Schalke 04
Ajax (Netherlands)	0–0 (5–6 p)	(Italy) Roma
Chelsea (England)	3–1	(Russia) Zenit Saint Petersburg

=== Quarter-finals ===
The quarter-finals were played on 10, 17 and 18 March 2015.

Home team	Score	Away team
Chelsea (England)	2–0	(Spain) Atlético Madrid
Benfica (Portugal)	1–1 (4–5 p)	(Ukraine) Shakhtar Donetsk
Roma (Italy)	2–1	(England) Manchester City
Anderlecht (Belgium)	5–0	(Portugal) Porto

=== Semi-finals ===
The semi-finals were played on 10 April 2015 at the Colovray Stadium in Nyon, Switzerland.

Team 1	Score	Team 2
Anderlecht (Belgium)	1–3	(Ukraine) Shakhtar Donetsk
Roma (Italy)	0–4	(England) Chelsea

=== Final ===
The final was played on 13 April 2015 at the Colovray Stadium in Nyon, Switzerland.

13 April 2015
16:00

Shakhtar Donetsk (Ukraine)	2–3	(England) Chelsea
Christensen 37' (o.g.); Kovalenko 90+2'	Report	Brown 7', 55'; Solanke 47'

Colovray Stadium, Nyon
Attendance: 4,000
Referee: Serdar Gözübüyük (Netherlands)

== Statistics ==
=== Top goalscorers ===
Rank	Player	Team	Goals	Minutes played
1	(England) Dominic Solanke	(England) Chelsea	12	765
2	(Belgium) Aaron Leya Iseka	(Belgium) Anderlecht	9	650
3	(Spain) Borja Mayoral	(Spain) Real Madrid	7	552
4	(Morocco) Zakaria El Azzouzi	(Netherlands) Ajax	6	188
4	(England) Jerome Sinclair	(England) Liverpool	6	604
4	(Republic of Ireland) Jack Byrne	(England) Manchester City	6	653
7	(Greece) Nikos Vergos	(Greece) Olympiacos	5	408
7	(Colombia) Leonardo Acevedo	(Portugal) Porto	5	418
7	(Croatia) Marc Brašnić	(Germany) Bayer Leverkusen	5	450
7	(England) Daniel Crowley	(England) Arsenal	5	630
7	(England) Charlie Colkett	(England) Chelsea	5	889

Source: UEFA.com

=== Top assists ===
Rank	Player	Team	Assists	Minutes played
1	(Belgium) Andy Kawaya	(Belgium) Anderlecht	6	520
2	(Switzerland) Arxhend Cani	(Switzerland) Basel	5	502
2	(Ivory Coast) Yakou Meïté	(France) Paris Saint-Germain	5	540
2	(Portugal) João Carvalho	(Portugal) Benfica	5	654
2	(England) Izzy Brown	(England) Chelsea	5	744
2	(Denmark) Andreas Christensen	(England) Chelsea	5	900
7	(Portugal) Renato Sanches	(Portugal) Benfica	4	438
7	(Guadeloupe) Thierry Ambrose	(England) Manchester City	4	703
7	(England) Dominic Solanke	(England) Chelsea	4	765
7	(Ukraine) Denys Arendaruk	(Ukraine) Shakhtar Donetsk	4	815
7	(England) Charlie Colkett	(England) Chelsea	4	889
7	(Ukraine) Oleksandr Zubkov	(Ukraine) Shakhtar Donetsk	4	897

Source: UEFA.com
