= José Postiga =

Portuguese footballer

Personal information
- Full name: José Manuel Marques Postiga
- Date of birth: 3 May 1996 (age 30)
- Place of birth: Vila do Conde, Portugal
- Height: 1.76 m (5 ft 9 in)
- Position: Forward

Youth career
- 2004–2009: Varzim
- 2009–2015: Sporting CP

Senior career*
Years	Team	Apps	(Gls)
2014–2015	Sporting CP B	1	(0)
2015–2018	Rio Ave	0	(0)
2016	→ Varzim (loan)	10	(1)
2016–2017	→ Académico Viseu (loan)	6	(0)
2017–2018	→ Salgueiros (loan)	13	(3)
2018	→ Felgueiras 1932 (loan)	3	(1)
2018–2019	Rio Ave U23	32	(5)
2018–2019	Rio Ave B	2	(0)
2019	Trofense	1	(0)
2020	Varzim B	4	(1)
2020–2021	Brito	7	(1)
2021	Pedras Rubras	9	(1)
2021–2022	Merelinense	21	(12)
2022–2023	Anadia	7	(0)
2023	Rebordosa	6	(1)
Total		122	(26)

International career
2011–2012	Portugal U16	12	(3)
2012–2013	Portugal U17	12	(8)
2013–2014	Portugal U18	7	(1)
- * Club domestic league appearances and goals

José Manuel Marques Postiga (born 3 May 1996) is a Portuguese former professional footballer who played as a forward.

== Club career ==
=== Sporting CP ===
Born in Vila do Conde, Postiga joined Sporting CP in 2009 at the age of 13, from local Varzim SC. In August 2014, while still a junior, he was included in the B team's 18-man squad for the Segunda Liga match away to S.C. Farense, the opening day of the season. He made his competition debut on the 10th, coming on as an 87th-minute substitute for Filipe Chaby in a 1–0 loss.

Additionally, Postiga competed with the academy in the UEFA Youth League and scored twice in an eventual group stage exit, starting with a penalty kick in a 3–1 win at NK Maribor.

=== Rio Ave ===
On 27 June 2015, Postiga signed a three-year contract with Rio Ave FC. On 12 January of the following year, having not featured at all in competitive games, he returned to the second division after being loaned to nearby Varzim for the remainder of the season. Eleven days later, he made his debut for his new team, replacing Elísio for the final 23 minutes of a 4–0 away victory over Leixões SC. His only goal for the Poveiros came in his final game on 8 May, concluding a 2–0 defeat of relegated Clube Oriental de Lisboa again from the bench.

Postiga returned to the second tier ahead of 2016–17, joining Académico de Viseu F.C. on loan. A year later he was loaned to S.C. Salgueiros in the third and, halfway through that campaign, he joined F.C. Felgueiras 1932 of the same league in the same manner.

=== Later years ===
Postiga departed for C.D. Trofense in 2019, having not made a first-team appearance for his hometown club. In February 2020 he signed again for Varzim, where he was assigned to the reserves. Eight months later, he joined division three side Brito SC, and remained there in the ensuing seasons with F.C. Pedras Rubras and Merelinense FC.

== International career ==
Postiga scored a hat-trick for Portugal on 29 September 2012 in a 4–2 win over Iceland at the Ta' Qali National Stadium in qualification for the 2013 European Under-17 Championship.

== Personal life ==
Postiga's older brother, Hélder, was also a footballer and forward. He too represented Sporting and Rio Ave, also being a longtime Portugal international.

Their father's cousin, Armindo, a member at Rio Ave, died in a fishing shipwreck off Figueira da Foz in August 2015.
