= Aleksandr Kurnayev =

Russian footballer

Personal information
- Full name: Aleksandr Aleksandrovich Kurnayev
- Date of birth: 1 July 1985 (age 41)
- Height: 1.82 m (5 ft 11 1/2 in)
- Position: Midfielder

Youth career
- DYuSSh Smena-Zenit

Senior career*
Years	Team	Apps	(Gls)
2004	Zenit Saint Petersburg	0	(0)
2005	SKA Rostov-on-Don	17	(1)
2006	Lukhovitsy	8	(0)
2007–2008	Dynamo Vologda	47	(4)
2008–2010	Dynamo Saint Petersburg	42	(1)
2011	Žalgiris Vilnius	27	(1)
2012	FC Pskov-747	8	(0)
2013–2014	FC Sever Murmansk	35	(0)
2014	FC Volga Tver	12	(0)
- * Club domestic league appearances and goals

Aleksandr Aleksandrovich Kurnayev (Russian: Александр Александрович Курнаев; born 1 July 1985) is a former Russian professional football player.

== Club career ==
He played in the Russian Football National League for FC Dynamo Saint Petersburg in 2010.
