= Noga =

Noga may refer to:

== Businesses ==
- Noga Communications, an Israeli television production company
- Noga SA, a Swiss firm led by Nessim Gaon, known for its trials with Russian authorities

== People ==
- Noga (name)
- Nogah, a Biblical figure, a son of David

== Other uses ==
- Noga, Israel, a moshav in the Lakhish Regional Council in Israel
- SS Noga, an ocean liner
