= Noga (name) =

Noga is both a surname and a given name. It may refer to:

== Surname ==
- Al Noga (born 1965), American football player
- Artur Noga (born 1988), Polish hurdler
- Niko Noga (born 1962), American football player
- Paulo Noga (born 1980), Portuguese footballer
- Pete Noga (born 1964), American football player

== Given name ==
- Noga Alon (born 1956), Israeli mathematician
- Noga Block (born 2004), Israeli rhythmic gymnast
- Noga Erez (born 1989), Israeli singer, songwriter and producer
- Noga Hareuveni (1924–2007), Israeli botanist and Judaic Studies scholar
- Noga Nir-Kistler (1979–2021), Israeli-born American Paralympic swimmer and table tennis player
