= Ardit Toli =

Albanian footballer

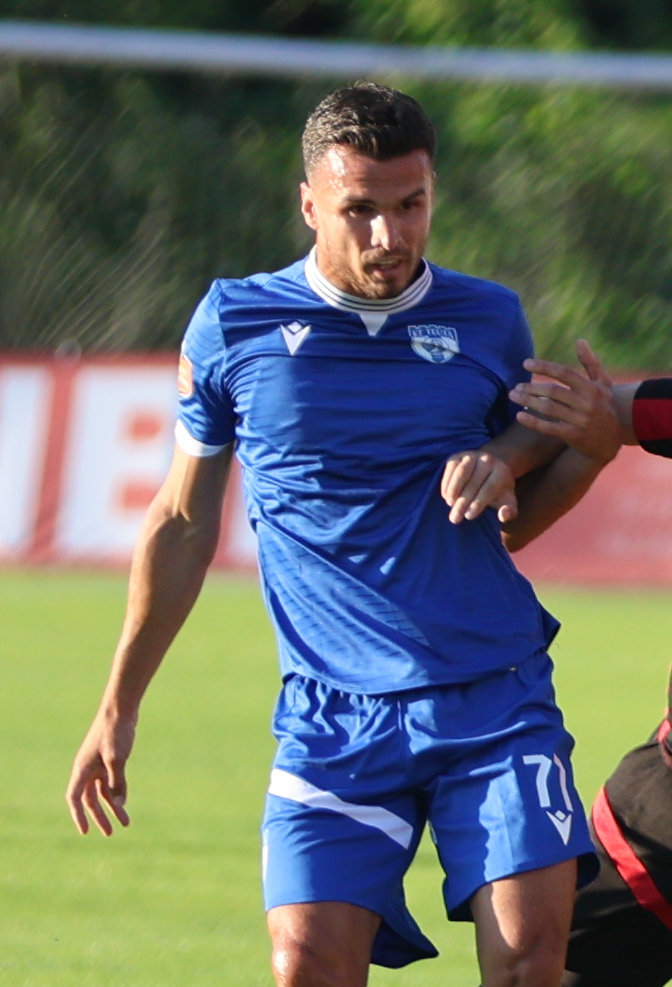

Personal information
- Date of birth: 12 July 1997 (age 29)
- Place of birth: Piraeus, Greece
- Height: 1.82 m (6 ft 0 in)
- Position: Defender

Team information
- Current team: Teuta Durrës
- Number: 77

Youth career
- 2010–2017: Olympiacos

Senior career*
Years	Team	Apps	(Gls)
2017–2019	AO Chania Kissamikos	49	(3)
2019–2020	Kalamata	11	(0)
2020–2022	Tirana	60	(0)
2022–2024	Vorskla Poltava	18	(0)
2023	→ Torpedo Kutaisi (loan)	0	(0)
2024–2025	Dinamo City	26	(0)
2025–	Teuta Durrës	34	(1)

International career^{‡}
2013–2014	Albania U17	6	(1)
2014–2015	Albania U19	5	(1)
2016–2018	Albania U21	15	(0)
2022–	Albania	1	(0)
- * Club domestic league appearances and goals as of 13 May 2026 ‡ National team caps and goals as of 26 October 2022

Ardit Toli (born 12 July 1997) is a professional footballer who plays as a defender for Teuta Durrës. Born in Greece, he plays for the Albania national team.

== Club career ==
=== Early career ===
Toli started his youth career at Olympiacos Youth Academy.

On 11 August 2017 he was loaned out to Football League team AO Chania Kissamikos until 30 June 2018. He made his professional debut for AO Chania Kissamikos on 21 September 2017 in the 2017–18 Greek Cup Group stage match against Acharnaikos playing the full 90-minutes match to help his team to win 1–0.

In January 2023 he moved to Torpedo Kutaisi.

== Honours ==
=== Club ===
Tirana

- Kategoria Superiore
  - Winner:2021–22

Dinamo

- Kupa e Shqipërisë
  - Winner:2024–25

=== Club ===
As of 14 January 2023

Club statistics
Club	Season	League			Cup		Europe (Note: Including continental competitions, such as UEFA Champions League and UEFA Europa League)		Other		Total	
Club	Season	Division	Apps	Goals	Apps	Goals	Apps	Goals	Apps	Goals	Apps	Goals
AO Chania Kissamikos	2017–18	Football League	23	3	3	0	—		—		26	3
Career total			23	3	3	0	—		—		26	3
