= Elísio =

Portuguese footballer

Personal information
- Full name: Elísio José Oliveira Esteves
- Date of birth: 5 May 1989 (age 37)
- Place of birth: Matosinhos, Portugal
- Height: 1.67 m (5 ft 6 in)
- Position: Forward

Team information
- Current team: Anadia
- Number: 16

Youth career
- 1997−2008: FC Porto
- 2004−2005: → Padroense (loan)
- 2006−2007: → Candal (loan)

Senior career*
Years	Team	Apps	(Gls)
2008–2010	Esmoriz	32	(5)
2010–2011	Sp.Espinho	13	(0)
2011–2012	Fafe	27	(5)
2012–2014	Penafiel	13	(1)
2014–2016	Varzim	15	(2)
2016–2017	Sanjoanense	21	(5)
2017–2018	Vilaverdense	21	(3)
2018–2019	Trofense	25	(2)
2019–2020	Arouca	20	(1)
2020–2021	São João de Ver	20	(3)
2021–	Anadia	2	(0)

International career
2006	Portugal U17	3	(0)
- * Club domestic league appearances and goals as of 22 August 2021

Elísio José Oliveira Esteves (born 5 May 1989) is a Portuguese footballer who plays for Anadia as a forward.
