= Pascal Richter =

German footballer

Personal information
- Date of birth: 10 October 1996 (age 30)
- Place of birth: Oldenburg, Germany
- Height: 1.75 m (5 ft 9 in)
- Position: Midfielder

Team information
- Current team: VfB Oldenburg
- Number: 18

Youth career
- –2012: VfB Oldenburg
- 2012–2013: VfL Osnabrück
- 2013–2015: Bayer Leverkusen

Senior career*
| Years | Team | Apps | (Gls) |
| 2015–2016 | VfL Osnabrück | 2 | (0) |
| 2015–2016 | VfL Osnabrück II | 33 | (7) |
| 2017– | VfB Oldenburg | 136 | (11) |
- * Club domestic league appearances and goals as of 1 January 2025

Pascal Richter (born 10 October 1996) is a German footballer who plays as a midfielder for VfB Oldenburg.
