= Luís Elói =

Portuguese footballer

Personal information
- Full name: Luís Miguel Serra Cruz Elói
- Date of birth: 10 March 1996 (age 30)
- Place of birth: Lisbon, Portugal
- Height: 1.73 m (5 ft 8 in)
- Position: Forward

Team information
- Current team: Sintrense (on loan from Sporting B)

Youth career
- 2007–2008: CAC
- 2008–2009: Sporting
- 2009–2013: CAC
- 2013–2014: Vitória de Setúbal
- 2014–2015: Sporting

Senior career*
Years	Team	Apps	(Gls)
2015–	Sporting B	8	(3)
2017–	→ Sintrense (loan)	5	(2)
- * Club domestic league appearances and goals as of 9 October 2017

Luís Miguel Serra Cruz Elói (born 10 March 1996) is a Portuguese footballer who plays for Sintrense on loan from Sporting B, as a forward.

== Football career ==
On 24 May 2015, Elói made his professional debut with Sporting B in a 2014–15 Segunda Liga match against Sporting Braga B.
