= Junior Flores =

American soccer player

Personal information
- Full name: Herber Omar Mejia Flores
- Date of birth: March 26, 1996 (age 30)
- Place of birth: Los Angeles, California, United States
- Height: 1.69 m (5 ft 7 in)
- Position: Midfielder

Youth career
- 2007 - 2010: LMVSC Hawks
- 2010–2011: Great Falls Rangers
- 2011–2013: IMG Academy
- 2013–2014: Borussia Dortmund

Senior career*
Years	Team	Apps	(Gls)
2014–2018	Borussia Dortmund II	15	(0)

International career^{‡}
2011–2013	United States U17	12	(1)
2014	United States U20	2	(0)
- * Club domestic league appearances and goals as of December 30, 2016 ‡ National team caps and goals as of September 20, 2014

Herber Omar Mejia "Junior" Flores (born March 26, 1996) is an American soccer player who currently is a free agent.

== Early life ==
Junior Flores was born in Los Angeles, California to Salvadoran parents, before moving to Manassas Park, Virginia when he was a child. He attended Manassas Park High School and, as a freshman, led the school to the Group A state title. During his youth, he played for the LMVSC Hawks, coached by Paul Ngend. He then went to the McLean Youth Soccer Club in McLean, Virginia. Before he was able to play for them, IMG Academy Bradenton invited Flores to join their program. After his performance in the 2011 Nike International Friendlies tournament, where the 15-year-old Flores had one assist vs. France, two assists vs. Brazil and scored the game-winning goal vs. Turkey, Flores received offers from many MLS clubs, as well as offers from abroad. Paris Saint-Germain and Liverpool were among several European clubs interested in Flores, but ultimately, he signed with Borussia Dortmund in a four-year contract effective once Flores turned 18.

== International ==
Flores has played for both the United States U17 and the United States U20 national teams.
