= UEFA Youth League =

- Organiser(s): UEFA
- Founded: 2013; 13 years ago
- Region: Europe
- Teams: 88
- Qualifier for: Under-20 Intercontinental Cup
- Current champions: (Spain) Real Madrid (2nd title)
- Most championships: (Spain) Barcelona (3 titles)
- Website: uefa.com/uefayouthleague
- 2026–27 UEFA Youth League

The UEFA Youth League (UYL) is an annual club football competition organised by the Union of European Football Associations (UEFA) since 2013. In its current format, it is contested by the under-19 teams of the clubs competing in the UEFA Champions League league phase, plus the domestic youth champions of the national associations.

The semi-finals and final matches have been traditionally played at the Colovray Stadium in Nyon, Switzerland, although for the 2022–23 edition, they were moved to the Stade de Genève due to increased interest in the tournament from the supporters of the participating clubs. The winners are awarded the Lennart Johansson Trophy, named in honour of the former UEFA president.

The most successful team is Barcelona with three titles. The current champions are Real Madrid, who beat Club Brugge 4–2 on penalties after a 1–1 draw in the 2026 final.

== History ==
In May 2010, UEFA organised a match, referred to as the "UEFA Under-18 Challenge", between the under-18 teams of Bayern Munich and Internazionale, three days prior to the UEFA Champions League final between the respective senior sides. Internazionale won the match 2–0 with two goals from Denis Alibec. The match was part of "UEFA Grassroots Day", and acted as an inspiration for the UEFA Youth League. British media commented that the competition was formed to displace the NextGen Series.

The teams in the first tournament, 2013–14 UEFA Youth League, played a group stage with the same composition and calendar as the 2013–14 UEFA Champions League group stage, and was held on a 'trial basis'. The eight group winners and eight runners-up from group stage then participated in a knockout phase. Unlike the UEFA Champions League, the knockout phase had single-leg ties, with the semi-finals and final played at neutral venues. In April 2014, Barcelona became the first winners, beating Benfica 3–0 in the final four held in Nyon.

After a two-year trial period, the UEFA Youth League became a permanent UEFA competition starting from the 2015–16 season, with the tournament expanded from 32 to 64 teams to allow the youth domestic champions of the top 32 associations according to their UEFA country coefficients to also participate. The 32 UEFA Champions League group stage youth teams retain the group stage format, with the group winners advancing to the round of 16 and the runners-up advancing to the play-offs. The 32 youth domestic champions play two rounds of two-legged ties, with the eight winners advancing to the play-offs, where they play a single match at home against the Champions League path runners-up. The round of 16 onwards retain the same format of single-leg ties as before.

From the 2024–25 season onwards, the format of the UEFA Youth League was changed to accommodate the changes to be seen in the UEFA Champions League, with some differences:

- The new 36 team group stage for the Champions League path will only mirror the first six matchdays of the senior competition, with the top 22 teams making the knockout stage.
- The domestic champions path will be expanded to three rounds, with the remaining 10 clubs facing the teams ranked 7th to 16th in the group stage; the top 6 from the Champions League path will face the teams ranked 17th to 22nd.
- The Youth League champions from the previous season qualify for the domestic champions path unless their senior team makes the Champions League group stage, in which case they will participate in the Champions League path.

== Finals ==
List of UEFA Youth League finals
Ed.	Season	Winners	Score	Runners-up	Losing semi-finalists	Venue
1	2013–14	(Spain) Barcelona	3–0	(Portugal) Benfica	(Spain) Real Madrid and (Germany) Schalke 04	Colovray Stadium, Nyon, Switzerland
2	2014–15	(England) Chelsea	3–2	(Ukraine) Shakhtar Donetsk	(Belgium) Anderlecht and (Italy) Roma	Colovray Stadium, Nyon, Switzerland
3	2015–16	(England) Chelsea	2–1	(France) Paris Saint-Germain	(Belgium) Anderlecht and (Spain) Real Madrid	Colovray Stadium, Nyon, Switzerland
4	2016–17	(Austria) Red Bull Salzburg	2–1	(Portugal) Benfica	(Spain) Barcelona and (Spain) Real Madrid	Colovray Stadium, Nyon, Switzerland
5	2017–18	(Spain) Barcelona	3–0	(England) Chelsea	(England) Manchester City and (Portugal) Porto	Colovray Stadium, Nyon, Switzerland
6	2018–19	(Portugal) Porto	3–1	(England) Chelsea	(Spain) Barcelona and (Germany) TSG Hoffenheim	Colovray Stadium, Nyon, Switzerland
7	2019–20	(Spain) Real Madrid	3–2	(Portugal) Benfica	(Netherlands) Ajax and (Austria) Red Bull Salzburg	Colovray Stadium, Nyon, Switzerland
–	2020–21	Cancelled due to the COVID-19 pandemic in Europe				
8	2021–22	(Portugal) Benfica	6–0	(Austria) Red Bull Salzburg	(Spain) Atlético Madrid and (Italy) Juventus	Colovray Stadium, Nyon, Switzerland
9	2022–23	(Netherlands) AZ	5–0	(Croatia) Hajduk Split	(Italy) Milan and (Portugal) Sporting CP	Stade de Genève, Geneva, Switzerland
10	2023–24	(Greece) Olympiacos	3–0	(Italy) Milan	(France) Nantes and (Portugal) Porto	Colovray Stadium, Nyon, Switzerland
11	2024–25	(Spain) Barcelona	4–1	(Turkey) Trabzonspor	(Netherlands) AZ and (Austria) Red Bull Salzburg	Colovray Stadium, Nyon, Switzerland
12	2025–26	(Spain) Real Madrid	1–1 (4–2 pen.)	(Belgium) Club Brugge	(Portugal) Benfica and (France) Paris Saint-Germain	Stade de la Tuilière, Lausanne, Switzerland

== Winners ==
=== By club ===
List of winners by club
Club	Titles	Runners-up	Years won	Years runners-up
(Spain) Barcelona	3	0	2014, 2018, 2025	—
(England) Chelsea	2	2	2015, 2016	2018, 2019
(Spain) Real Madrid	2	0	2020, 2026	—
(Portugal) Benfica	1	3	2022	2014, 2017, 2020
(Austria) Red Bull Salzburg	1	1	2017	2022
(Portugal) Porto	1	0	2019	—
(Netherlands) AZ	1	0	2023	—
(Greece) Olympiacos	1	0	2024	—
(Ukraine) Shakhtar Donetsk	0	1	—	2015
(France) Paris Saint-Germain	0	1	—	2016
(Croatia) Hajduk Split	0	1	—	2023
(Italy) Milan	0	1	—	2024
(Turkey) Trabzonspor	0	1	—	2025
(Belgium) Club Brugge	0	1	—	2026

=== By country ===
List of winners by country
Country	Winners	Runners-up	Years won	Years runners-up
Spain	5	0	2014, 2018, 2020, 2025, 2026	—
Portugal	2	3	2019, 2022	2014, 2017, 2020
England	2	2	2015, 2016	2018, 2019
Austria	1	1	2017	2022
Netherlands	1	0	2023	—
Greece	1	0	2024	—
Ukraine	0	1	—	2015
France	0	1	—	2016
Croatia	0	1	—	2023
Italy	0	1	—	2024
Turkey	0	1	—	2025
Belgium	0	1	—	2026
