= Andrea Paolelli =

Italian footballer (born 1997)

Personal information
- Date of birth: 31 July 1997 (age 29)
- Place of birth: Viterbo, Italy
- Height: 1.83 m (6 ft 0 in)
- Position: Right back

Team information
- Current team: Lodigiani
- Number: 5

Youth career
- –2016: Roma

Senior career*
Years	Team	Apps	(Gls)
2016–2019	Roma	0	(0)
2016–2017	→ Viterbese (loan)	5	(0)
2017–2019	→ Gubbio (loan)	25	(1)
2019–2020	Albalonga	10	(0)
2020–2024	Romana	58	(0)
2024–	Lodigiani	57	(2)
- * Club domestic league appearances and goals as of 25 Juny 2026

Andrea Paolelli (born 31 July 1997) is an Italian footballer who plays as a right back for Serie D club Lodigiani.

== Club career ==
He made his Serie C debut for Viterbese Castrense on 25 March 2017 in a game against Lucchese.
