= Marco Hingerl =

German footballer

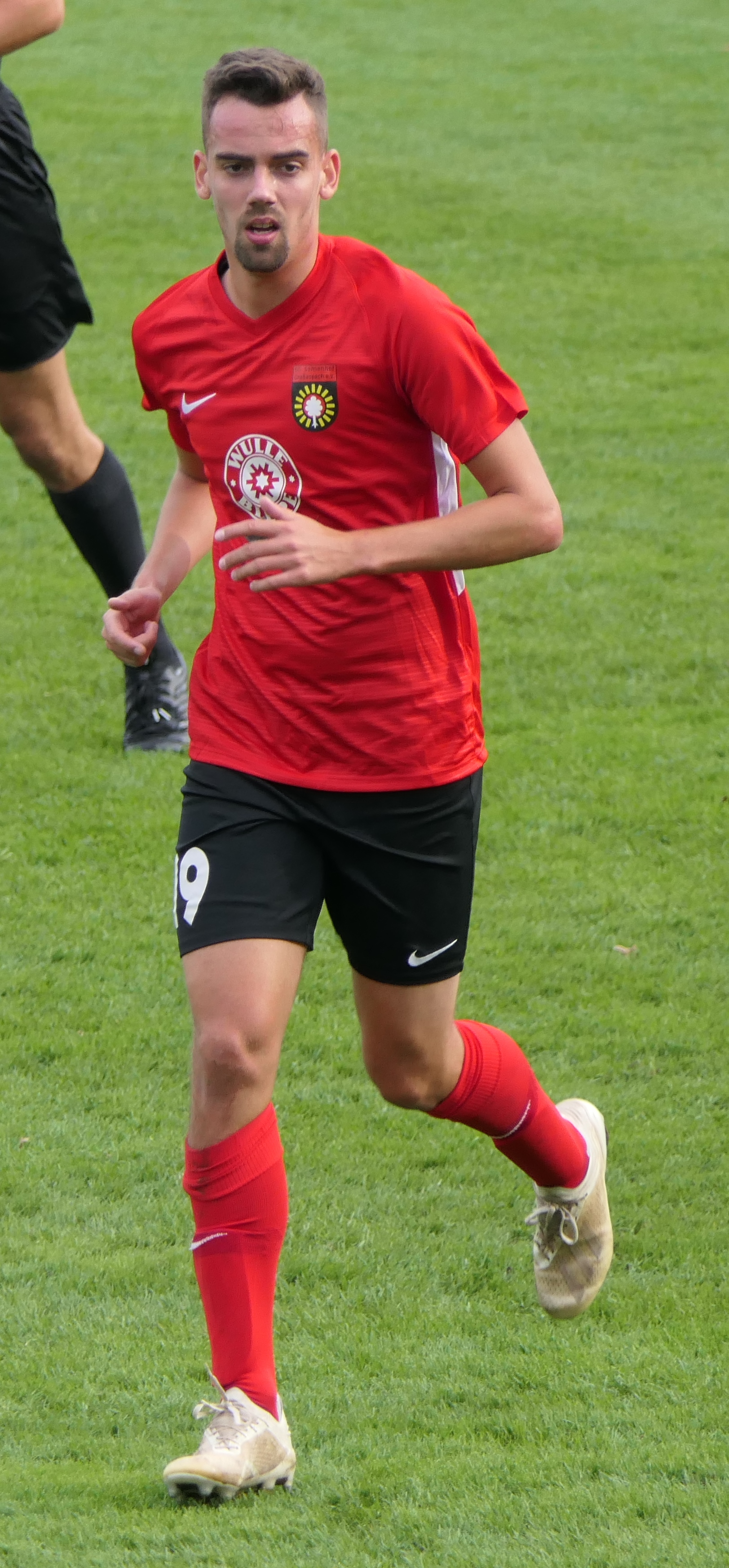
- Hingerl with Sonnenhof Großaspach

Personal information
- Date of birth: 3 May 1996 (age 30)
- Place of birth: Munich, Germany
- Height: 1.82 m (6 ft 0 in)
- Position: Midfielder

Team information
- Current team: FV Illertissen
- Number: 25

Youth career
- –2010: SpVgg Unterhaching
- 2010–2015: Bayern Munich

Senior career*
Years	Team	Apps	(Gls)
2015–2016	SC Freiburg	0	(0)
2015–2016	SC Freiburg II	22	(1)
2016–2018	Bayern Munich II	49	(15)
2018–2020	Sonnenhof Großaspach	42	(5)
2020–2022	FC Homburg	70	(5)
2022–2023	SSV Ulm	11	(0)
2023	Türkgücü München	11	(1)
2024–2025	Hessen Kassel	39	(4)
2025–	FV Illertissen	42	(5)

International career^{‡}
2014–2015	Germany U19	6	(0)
- * Club domestic league appearances and goals as of 27 September 2026 ‡ National team caps and goals as of 16:10, 28 July 2018 (UTC)

Marco Hingerl (born 3 May 1996) is a German professional footballer who plays as a midfielder for FV Illertissen.

== Club career ==
On 27 July 2020, Hingerl joined FC Homburg on a two-year deal.

On 12 August 2023, Hingerl's contract with SSV Ulm was terminated by mutual consent.
