= Isaac Padilla =

Spanish footballer

Personal information
- Full name: Isaac Padilla Cañadas
- Date of birth: 23 March 1996 (age 30)
- Place of birth: L'Hospitalet de Llobregat, Spain
- Height: 1.78 m (5 ft 10 in)
- Position: Midfielder

Youth career
- Damm
- Espanyol
- Damm
- 2015–2016: Barcelona

Senior career*
Years	Team	Apps	(Gls)
2016–2017	Sabadell B	6	(1)
2017	UE Sant Julià	10	(9)
2017–2018	Reus Deportiu B	12	(0)
2018–2019	Badalona	3	(0)
2019	Grama	12	(4)
2019–2020	Castelldefels	7	(2)
2020–2021	Al-Diwaniya		(1)
2021–2022	Guineueta	5	(0)
2022	Granollers	14	(3)
2022–2023	Castelldefels	24	(3)
2023–2024	Prat	31	(3)
- * Club domestic league appearances and goals as of 26 May 2024

Isaac Padilla Cañadas (born 23 March 1996) is a Spanish professional footballer who plays as a midfielder.

== Career ==
After playing for the youth academies of Damm and Espanyol, Padilla joined the youth academy of Spanish La Liga side Barcelona, where an injury prevented him from reaching the first team.

For the second half of 2016/17, he signed for UE Sant Julià in Andorra, making 10 league appearances and scoring 9 goals.

In 2019, Padilla signed for Spanish fourth division team Castelldefels.

For the second half of 2020, he signed for Al-Diwaniya in Iraq.
