= Colovray Sports Centre =

Stadium in Vaud, Switzerland

Centre sportif de Colovray
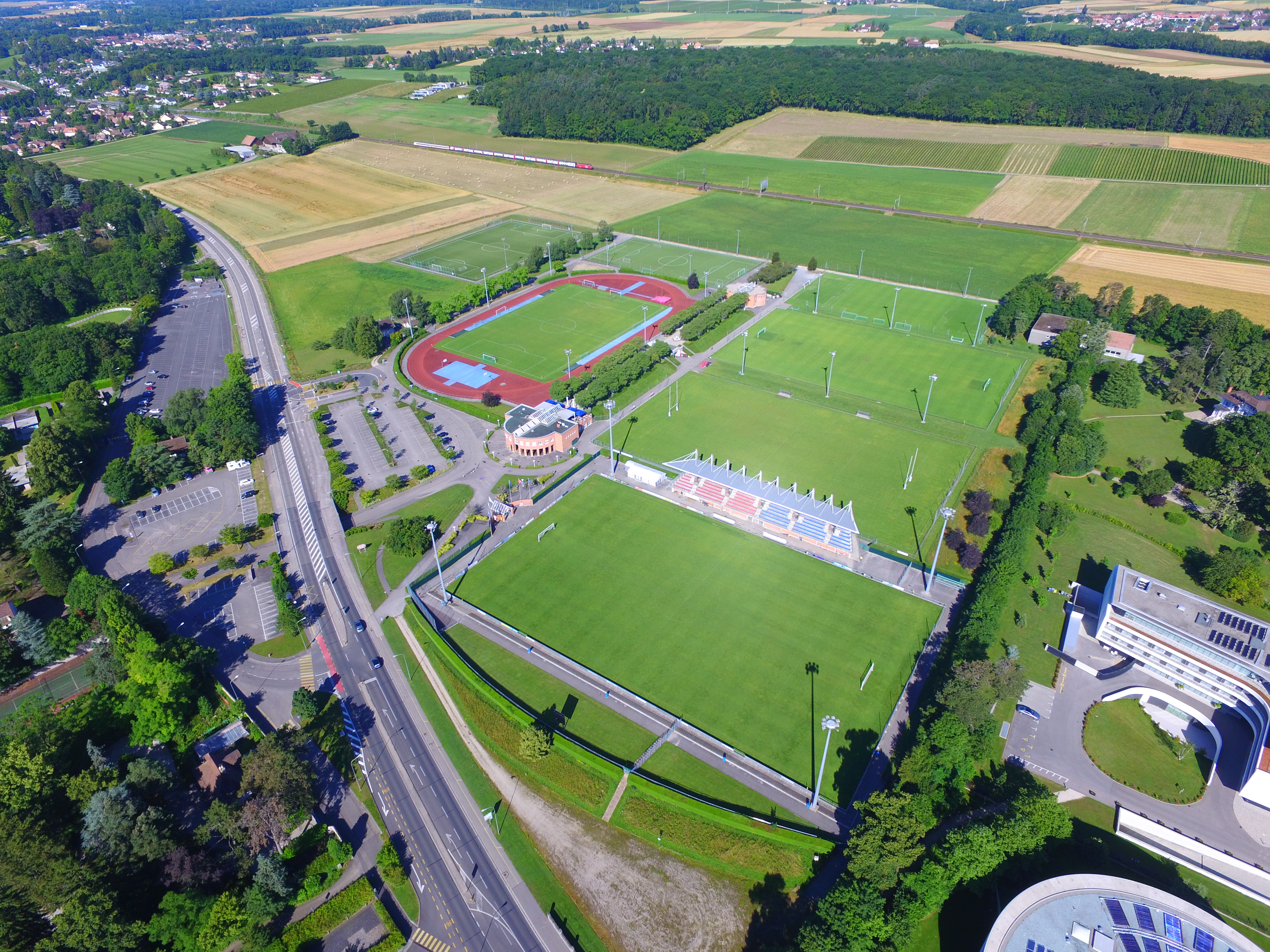
- Interactive map of Centre sportif de Colovray
- Location: Nyon, Vaud, Switzerland
- Coordinates: 46.370711°N 6.226201°E
- Capacity: 7,200
- Record attendance: 6,800 (against Real Madrid in 2001)

Tenants
- FC Stade Nyonnais; RC Nyon; FC Stade Lausanne Ouchy

Centre Sportif de Colovray Nyon is where FC Stade Nyonnais play their home football and rugby games. The site is opposite the UEFA headquarters. The centre has six pitches for different sports and hosts a variety of activities, football, rugby and athletics. The stadium has 860 seats and the rest is standing places.

== Events ==
In 2008, for the UEFA Euro 2008, Turkey had their base camp at this ground.

In June 2009, the ground hosted the 2009 UEFA Women's Under-17 Championship, with Germany and Spain reaching the final.

The stadium hosted the semi-finals and final of the UEFA Youth League from the 2013–14 season up until the 2021–22 season. The 2023 final was held at the Stade de Genève in Geneva.

The stadium hosted the preliminary round of the 2020–21 UEFA Champions League.

== See also ==
- List of football stadiums in Switzerland
