= Beka Vachiberadze =

Professional footballer

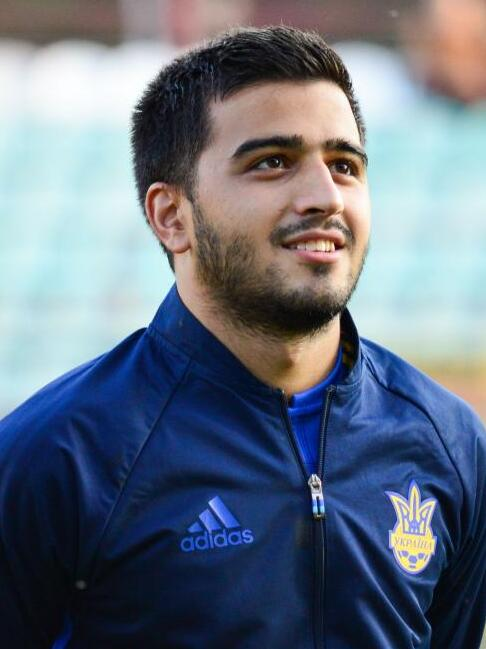

Personal information
- Full name: Beka Zazayovych Vachiberadze
- Date of birth: 5 March 1996 (age 30)
- Place of birth: Kutaisi, Georgia
- Height: 1.73 m (5 ft 8 in)
- Position: Midfielder

Team information
- Current team: FC Ulytau
- Number: 8

Youth career
- 2007–2012: Chornomorets Odesa
- 2012–2013: Shakhtar Donetsk

Senior career*
Years	Team	Apps	(Gls)
2013–2015	Shakhtar Donetsk	0	(0)
2014	→ Shakhtar-3 Donetsk	3	(0)
2015–2017	Betis B	11	(1)
2018–2019	RFS	36	(5)
2019–2020	Lommel	13	(1)
2021–2022	Chornomorets Odesa	28	(1)
2022	→ Torpedo Kutaisi (loan)	17	(0)
2022–2024	Metalist 1925 Kharkiv	40	(2)
2025–	Ulytau	49	(3)

International career
2011–2012	Ukraine U16	5	(1)
2012–2013	Ukraine U17	12	(3)
2013–2014	Ukraine U18	10	(4)
2014–2015	Ukraine U19	13	(4)
2015–2016	Ukraine U21	13	(2)
- * Club domestic league appearances and goals as of 1 November 2026

Beka Zazayovych Vachiberadze (Ukrainian: Бека Зазайович Вачіберадзе, Georgian: ბექა ვაჩიბერაძე; born 5 March 1996) is a professional footballer who plays as a midfielder for FC Ulytau in Kazakhstan Premier League. Born in Georgia, he represents Ukraine at international level.

== Club career ==
Born in Kutaisi, Georgia, Vachiberadze is a product of youth team systems of FC Chornomorets Odesa and FC Shakhtar Donetsk.

== International career ==
Vachiberadze represented Ukraine in the different national youth teams, but later he switched to his native Georgia and it was confirmed in November 2017 by FIFA. As for 2023 he not made debut for Georgian national team.

== Personal life ==
He is the son of former Torpedo Kutaisi player Zaza Vachiberadze.

== Honours ==
Torpedo Kutaisi

- Georgian Cup: 2022
