= Cristian Cedrés =

Spanish footballer

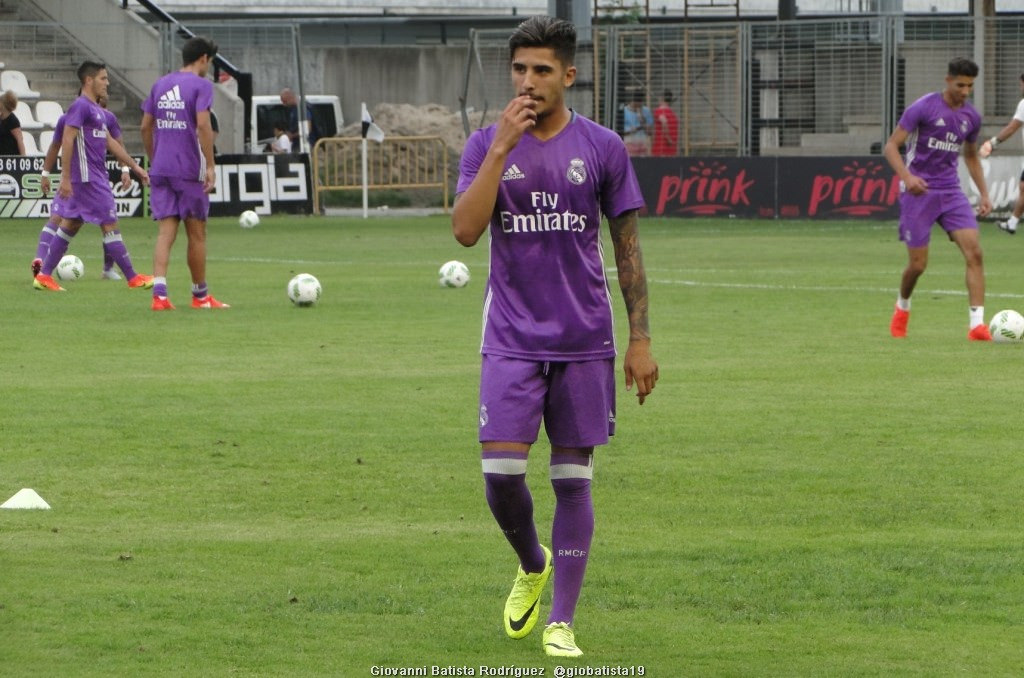

Personal information
- Full name: Cristian Josué Artiles Cedrés
- Date of birth: 24 January 1996 (age 30)
- Place of birth: Las Palmas, Spain
- Height: 1.72 m (5 ft 8 in)
- Position: Winger

Youth career
- 2004–2005: Carrizal
- 2005–2010: Las Palmas
- 2010–2014: Real Madrid

Senior career*
Years	Team	Apps	(Gls)
2014–2015	Real Madrid C	28	(4)
2015–2017	Real Madrid B	49	(5)
2017–2018	Villarreal B	16	(0)
2018–2019	Las Palmas B	15	(0)
2019–2021	Las Palmas	27	(1)

International career
2013	Spain U17	2	(0)
2015	Spain U19	2	(0)
- * Club domestic league appearances and goals as of 20 December 2020

Cristian Josué Artiles Cedrés (born 24 January 1996) is a Spanish footballer who plays as a left winger.

== Club career ==
Born in Las Palmas, Canary Islands, Cedrés joined Real Madrid's youth setup in 2010, from UD Las Palmas. He made his senior debut with the C-team on 7 September 2014, starting in a 2–3 Tercera División home loss against Fútbol Alcobendas Sport, and scored his first goal the following 4 January, netting his team's second in a 4–2 away defeat of AD Torrejón CF.

On 5 July 2015, Cedrés was promoted to the reserves in Segunda División B by manager Zinedine Zidane. On 26 June 2017, he moved to another reserve team, Villarreal CF B also in the third division.

On 17 July 2018, Cedrés returned to Las Palmas and was assigned to the B-side also in division three. On 27 November, he extended his contract until 2021.

Cedrés made his first team debut on 28 April 2019, starting a 4–1 home routing of CD Lugo in the Segunda División championship. On 17 June, he was definitely promoted to the main squad.

Cedrés subsequently struggled with injuries before terminating his contract with Las Palmas on 31 August 2021.
