= Paulo Noga =

Portuguese footballer

Personal information
- Full name: Paulo Jorge dos Santos Noga
- Date of birth: 3 September 1970 (age 56)
- Place of birth: Luanda, Portuguese Angola
- Height: 1.84 m (6 ft 0 in)
- Position: Defender

Youth career
- 1981–1986: Arcozelo
- 1986–1989: Boavista

Senior career*
Years	Team	Apps	(Gls)
1989–1991	Bragança		
1991–1994	Ermesinde		
1994–1996	Oliveirense		
1996–1998	Leça		
1998–1999	Feirense		
1999–2000	Oliveirense		
2000–2001	Avanca		
- * Club domestic league appearances and goals

Paulo Jorge dos Santos Noga (born 3 September 1970) is a retired Angolan-born, Portuguese football defender.
