= Leonardo Acevedo =

Colombian footballer (born 1996)

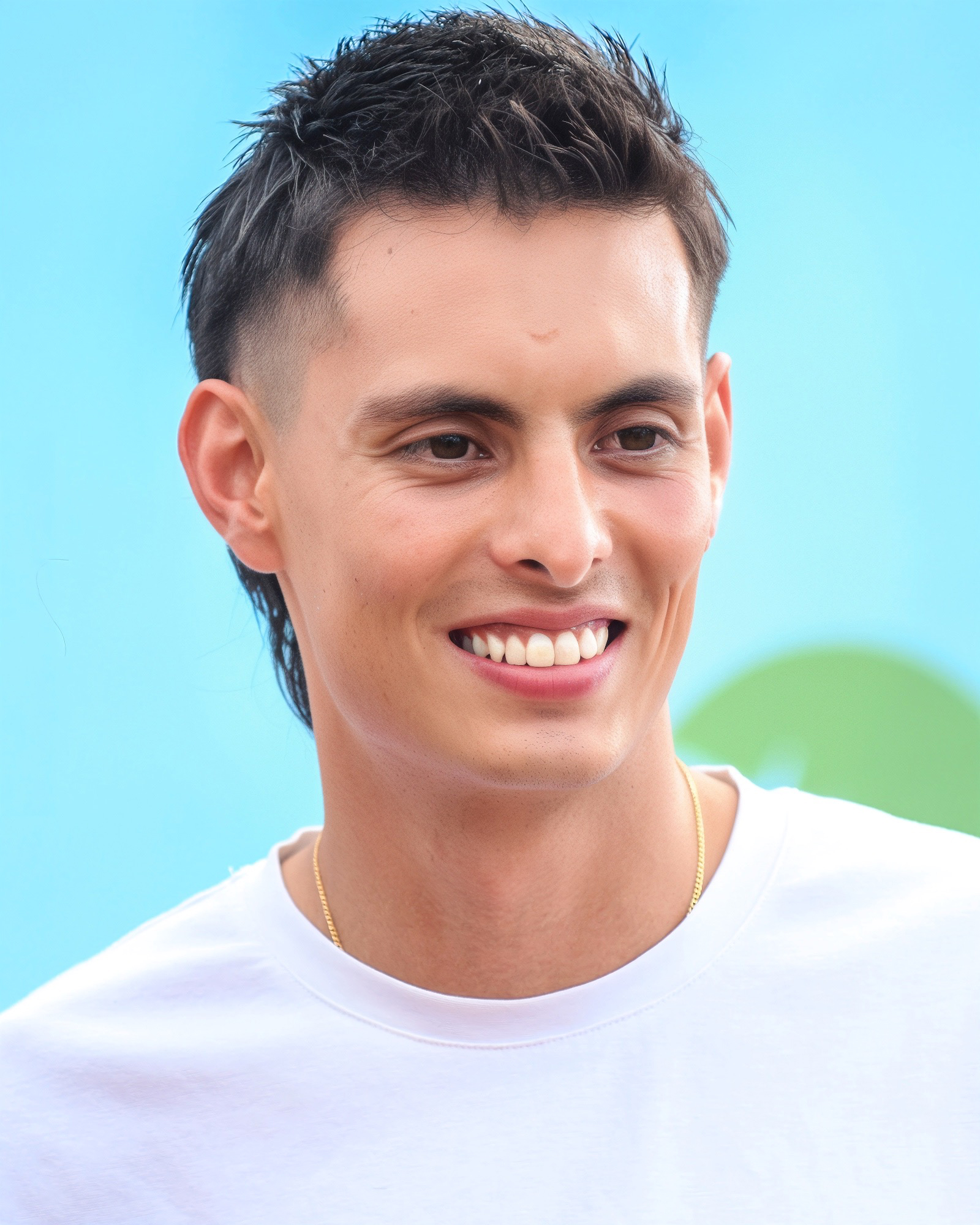
- Acevedo in 2026

Personal information
- Full name: Leonardo Acevedo Ruiz
- Date of birth: 18 April 1996 (age 30)
- Place of birth: Medellín, Colombia
- Height: 1.85 m (6 ft 1 in)
- Position: Forward

Team information
- Current team: FC Seoul
- Number: 11

Youth career
- 2013–2015: Atlético Nacional
- 2014–2015: → Porto (loan)

Senior career*
Years	Team	Apps	(Gls)
2013–2017	Atlético Nacional	0	(0)
2014–2016	→ Porto B (loan)	26	(9)
2016–2017	→ Sporting CP B (loan)	35	(12)
2017–2021	Sporting CP	0	(0)
2017–2018	→ Boavista (loan)	19	(1)
2018–2019	→ Zorya Luhansk (loan)	10	(0)
2019–2020	→ Varzim (loan)	18	(11)
2020–2021	→ Logroñés (loan)	30	(5)
2021–2022	Estoril	21	(3)
2022–2024	Rio Ave	39	(6)
2024–2025	Seongnam FC	71	(30)
2026–	FC Seoul	11	(3)
- * Club domestic league appearances and goals as of 11:37, 18 October 2026 (UTC)

Leonardo Acevedo Ruiz (born 18 April 1996) is a Colombian professional footballer who plays as a forward for K League 1 club FC Seoul.

Formed at Atlético Nacional, he spent most of his career in Portugal, being on the books of Porto and Sporting CP without making a senior appearance for either. He represented Boavista, Estoril and Rio Ave in the Primeira Liga, and Porto B, Sporting CP B and Varzim S.C. in the second tier, winning a title with Porto B in 2015–16.

== Career ==
=== Porto ===
Born in Medellín, Acevedo began his career at hometown club Atlético Nacional. In August 2014, he was loaned to Portugal's FC Porto for a year.

Acevedo played in the 2014–15 UEFA Youth League with Porto U19, scoring 5 goals in 5 matches, as well as 29 goals in 36 matches in the domestic season. On 24 May 2015, the last game of the Segunda Liga season, he played the first 56 minutes on his professional debut before being substituted for Dim in a goalless draw at relegated C.S. Marítimo B.

Again loaned to the same club in 2015–16, Acevedo scored nine goals in 25 games as Porto B became the first reserve team to win the second division. These included braces in home November wins over Gil Vicente F.C. (4–2) and C.D. Mafra (2–0).

=== Sporting ===
In July 2016, Acevedo was loaned for a year to another Portuguese club, Sporting CP, and again assigned to the reserve team. He scored 12 goals in his first season, joint ninth in the whole league.

Acevedo returned to the city of Porto in July 2017, being loaned for a year to Primeira Liga club Boavista F.C. after Sporting signed him permanently. He scored only once in his debut top-flight season, opening a 1–1 draw with C.D. Tondela at the Estádio do Bessa the following 30 March.

In August 2018, Acevedo was loaned to FC Zorya Luhansk of the Ukrainian Premier League. He went goalless in 11 total matches in Eastern Europe.

On 2 September 2019, Acevedo went back to Portugal's second tier, joining Varzim S.C. on loan. He scored on 17 December as they defeated Anadia F.C. 2–1 after extra time to reach the quarter-finals of the Taça de Portugal.

Acevedo joined Spanish Segunda División newcomers UD Logroñés on a one-year deal on 11 September 2020. He opened his account for the team from La Rioja on 28 October, with two goals at the start of the second half in a 3–2 win at Real Oviedo; he played 31 total games, scoring five times as his team were relegated.

=== Estoril and Rio Ave ===
On 21 July 2021, with his Sporting contract having expired, Acevedo signed a two-year deal with G.D. Estoril Praia, who were newly promoted to the same league. A year later, he moved for the same length for free to Rio Ave F.C. who were also freshly returned to the top level; Estoril kept 50% of his economic rights.

=== Seongnam FC ===
On 8 March 2024, Acevedo signed with K League 2 club Seongnam FC for the 2024 season. He was assigned the squad number 9.

=== FC Seoul ===
On 1 January 2026, Acevedo was announced to be joining K League 1 club FC Seoul for the 2026 season. He was given the jersey number 11.

== Honours ==
Porto

- Campeonato Nacional de Juniores A: 2014–15

Porto B

- LigaPro: 2015–16

FC Seoul

- K League 1: 2026

Individual

- Segunda División Player of the Month: November 2020
- K League 2 Best XI: 2025
