= Benfica Campus =

S.L. Benfica association football training center

Adidas Benfica Campus
- Centro de estágio e formação do Seixal
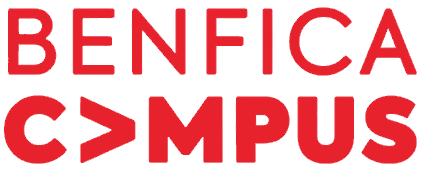

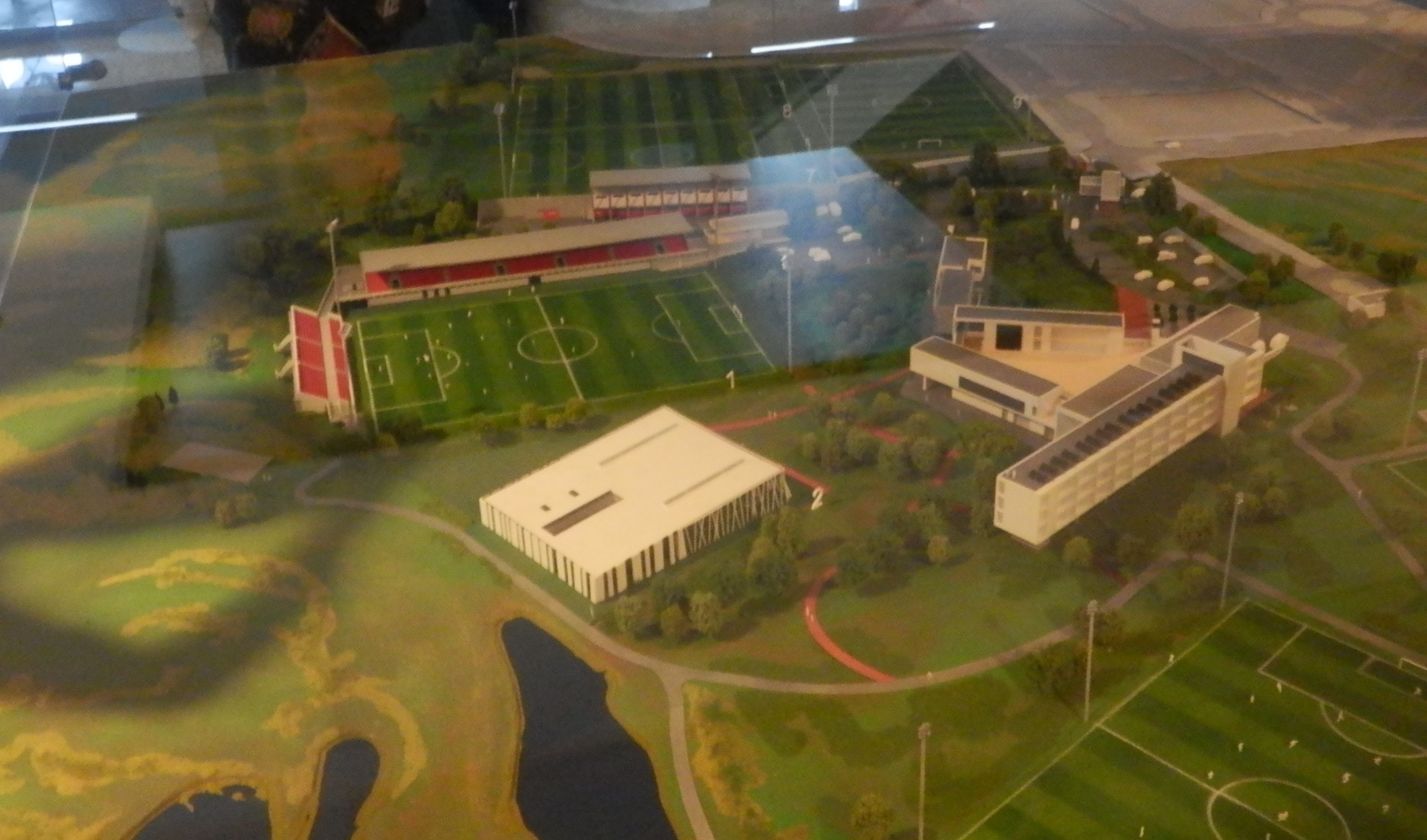
- Scale model of the training centre
- Interactive map of Adidas Benfica Campus
- Full name: Adidas Benfica Campus
- Former names: Caixa Futebol Campus (2006–2019)
- Address: Benfica Campus, Quinta da Trindade, 2840-600
- Location: Seixal, Portugal
- Coordinates: 38°38′26″N 09°05′31″W
- Owner: S.L. Benfica
- Operator: S.L. Benfica SAD
- Capacity: 2,644
- Surface: Grass (6); Synthetic turf (3)
- Acreage: 46.95

Construction
- Groundbreaking: January 2000
- Built: 2003–2005
- Opened: 22 September 2006
- Expanded: 2013–2014, 2017–2019
- Cost: €15,000,000
- Architects: Pedro George; Isabel Pessoa
- Builder: Britalar

Tenants
- Benfica (training ground); Benfica B Benfica women's Benfica (youth)

Website
- Benfica Campus

Benfica Campus (formerly Caixa Futebol Campus), also known as centro de estágio e formação do Seixal, is the training ground and youth academy of Portuguese football club Benfica. Having nine pitches (three of synthetic turf), including the main one with 2,644 seats – Benfica B's home ground – the training centre is used by Benfica's first-team, the reserves, and youth levels such as the under-19s. Located in Seixal, Benfica Campus opened on 22 September 2006 and was sponsored by Caixa Geral de Depósitos until September 2019.

== Infrastructure ==
Benfica Campus has a building consisting of a hotel with a capacity of 86 rooms, due to having the club's youth academy embedded in it. Moreover, it has two gyms, three physiotherapy rooms, 28 locker rooms, two cafeterias, two auditoriums, swimming pools, jacuzzis, sauna, and so on. After Benfica TV was launched in 2008, it gained a TV studio as well (the channel's second).

The infrastructure was expanded to accommodate all Benfica youth levels and, in particular, the Benfica B team. A new stand with 1,188 seats was constructed at the main field, increasing the latter's overall capacity to a maximum of 2,644 (1,466 covered seats) – thus surpassing the minimum required by Liga Portugal. In addition, a presidential box was created, and some changes were made to the press area, the control room, the tourniquets location, and the sector for supporters of visiting teams. The new stand was inaugurated on 1 December 2013.

As part of the training centre's expansion, its total area was increased from 15 to 19 hectares and, among other changes, three new pitches were created, one of them with a capacity of 604.
