= Marc Brašnić =

Professional footballer

Personal information
- Date of birth: 21 October 1996 (age 30)
- Place of birth: Aachen, Germany
- Height: 1.84 m (6 ft 1/2 in)
- Position: Forward

Team information
- Current team: Bonner SC
- Number: 19

Youth career
- JSV Baesweiler 09
- –2007: Alemannia Aachen
- 2007–2015: Bayer Leverkusen

Senior career*
Years	Team	Apps	(Gls)
2015–2017	Bayer Leverkusen	0	(0)
2015–2016	→ SC Paderborn (loan)	7	(0)
2016–2017	→ Fortuna Köln (loan)	10	(1)
2017–2018	Viktoria Köln	17	(2)
2018–2019	BFC Dynamo	24	(10)
2019–2020	Rot-Weiß Erfurt	17	(2)
2020	Berliner AK	0	(0)
2020–2023	1. FC Düren	61	(43)
2023–2024	Alemannia Aachen	23	(8)
2024–	Bonner SC	0	(0)

International career
2010	Germany U15	2	(1)
2014	Croatia U19	1	(0)
- * Club domestic league appearances and goals as of 31 August 2024

Marc Brašnić (born 21 October 1996) is a professional footballer who plays as a forward for Bonner SC. Born in Germany, he has represented both Germany and Croatia at youth level.

== Club career ==
In 2015, Brašnić joined SC Paderborn 07 on loan from Bayer 04 Leverkusen. He made his 2. Bundesliga debut on 29 August 2015 against Arminia Bielefeld. He replaced Marcel Ndjeng after 85 minutes.

On 2 September 2024, Brašnić signed with Bonner SC in the fifth-tier Mittelrheinliga.

== International career ==
Brašnić was born in Germany and is of Croatian descent. He made two appearances for the Germany U15 squad, scoring one goal. He then switched federations and made an appearance for Croatia U19.
