= Jack Byrne (footballer, born 1996) =

Irish footballer (born 1996)

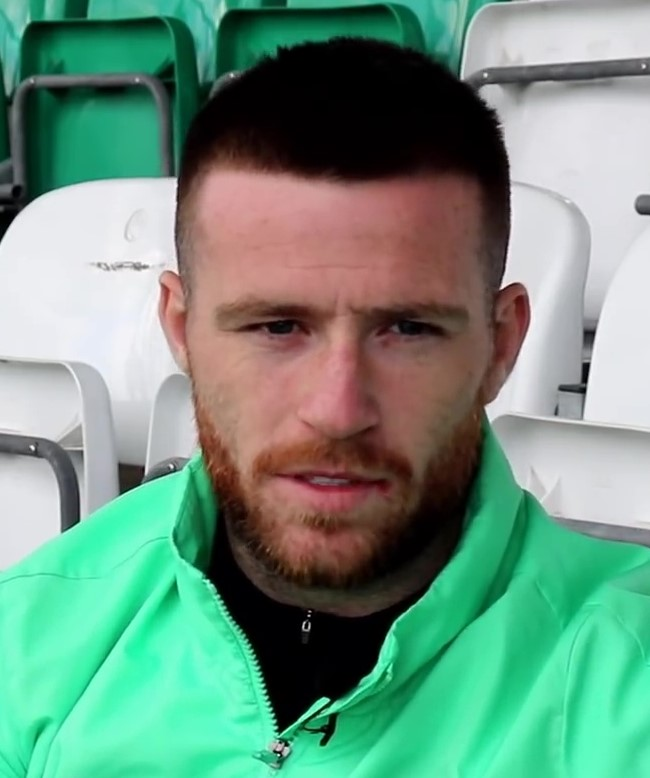
- Byrne in 2019

Personal information
- Full name: Jack Dylan Byrne
- Date of birth: 24 April 1996 (age 30)
- Place of birth: Dublin, Ireland
- Height: 1.75 m (5 ft 9 in)
- Position: Midfielder

Team information
- Current team: Shamrock Rovers
- Number: 29

Youth career
- St Kevin's Boys
- 2012–2015: Manchester City

Senior career*
Years	Team	Apps	(Gls)
2015–2017	Manchester City	0	(0)
2015–2016	→ Cambuur (loan)	27	(4)
2016–2017	→ Blackburn Rovers (loan)	4	(0)
2017–2018	Wigan Athletic	2	(0)
2017–2018	→ Oldham Athletic (loan)	22	(4)
2018	Oldham Athletic	18	(1)
2018	Kilmarnock	5	(0)
2019–2020	Shamrock Rovers	49	(17)
2020–2021	APOEL	5	(0)
2022–	Shamrock Rovers	126	(11)
2025	→ Dubai Irish (loan)	10	(1)

International career^{‡}
2011	Republic of Ireland U16	1	(0)
2012–2013	Republic of Ireland U17	6	(4)
2012	Republic of Ireland U18	1	(0)
2013	Republic of Ireland U19	2	(0)
2014–2016	Republic of Ireland U21	10	(0)
2019–2020	Republic of Ireland	4	(0)
- * Club domestic league appearances and goals as of 17:35, 9 November 2026 (UTC) ‡ National team caps and goals as of 12:03, 12 January 2023 (UTC)

Jack Dylan Byrne (born 24 April 1996) is an Irish professional footballer who plays as a midfielder for League of Ireland Premier Division club Shamrock Rovers. He has four caps for the Republic of Ireland national team, all coming in 2019–2020. He plays mainly as a midfielder but also can play as an attacking midfielder and winger.

== Club career ==
=== Manchester City ===
Byrne started playing football with St Kevin's Boys at the age of five and moved to England to join Manchester City at the age of 15. In the 2014–15 season Byrne scored six goals in eight UEFA Youth League games for Manchester City under-19.

==== Cambuur loan ====
In the summer of 2015, Byrne joined Eredivisie side Cambuur on loan. After missing the first six weeks of the season due to an ankle injury picked up in pre-season, Byrne made his professional debut on 19 September in a match against FC Twente.

==== Blackburn Rovers loan ====
On 29 June 2016, Byrne joined EFL Championship club Blackburn Rovers. He went on to make four league appearances for the club before Blackburn cancelled his season long loan on 6 January 2017.

=== Wigan Athletic ===
Later in January 2017, Byrne joined Wigan Athletic for an undisclosed fee, signing a three-and-a-half-year deal. He made his debut for the club as a second-half substitute in a 3–2 victory over Rotherham on 8 April 2017.

=== Oldham Athletic ===
On 15 January 2018, Byrne signed for Oldham Athletic for an undisclosed fee on a two-and-a-half-year deal. He was suspended by the club for an undisclosed, off the field incident, and subsequently released by Oldham Athletic on 31 August 2018, despite fan protests.

=== Kilmarnock ===
Soon after his release from Oldham, it was confirmed that Byrne had signed for Scottish Premiership side Kilmarnock on a one-year deal.

=== Shamrock Rovers ===
On 7 December 2018, Byrne joined League of Ireland Premier Division club Shamrock Rovers. His first goal for the club was a spectacular strike in a 3–0 home win over Sligo Rovers on 15 March. After several strong performances Byrne was named Premier Division Player of the Month for March and again for July. He scored once and assisted five times in Rovers' Europa League ties against SK Brann and Apollon Limassol. He helped Shamrock Rovers to the 2019 FAI Cup Final in the Aviva Stadium where they faced holders Dundalk. Rovers won the game 4–2 after a Penalty shoot-out and won the Cup for the first time in 32 years. He was a member of the Rovers squad who won the 2020 League of Ireland Premier Division, the clubs first since 2011, when they went the whole season unbeaten. He ended the season being named in the PFAI Team of the Year as well as being voted as the PFAI Players' Player of the Year. On 2 January 2021, Byrne confirmed his departure from Shamrock Rovers two days after his contract had ended.

=== APOEL ===
On 4 January 2021, Byrne moved to Cypriot club APOEL making five appearances and failing to score, struggling with a back injury. On 24 September 2021, Byrne left APOEL by mutual consent.

=== Return to Shamrock Rovers ===
It was announced on 19 November 2021, that Byrne would return to Shamrock Rovers on a contract beginning in January 2022.

==== Dubai Irish loan ====
On 30 August 2025, Byrne was loaned out to UAE Third Division League side Dubai Irish on loan until December, following a training ground row with Rovers manager Stephen Bradley that saw him frozen out from the team in the weeks leading up to the move. On 17 October 2025, he scored his first goal for the club in a 3–1 win away to Emerald Club. After returning to Rovers from his loan spell, he deemed the loan a success in gaining regular game time and allowing him to work on his fitness to return to his parent club in a better place.

== International career ==
Byrne has represented the Republic of Ireland up to Senior international level. He made his début for his country's Under-21 team when he was just 18 years old. He has since won 10 caps. He was called up to train with the Irish senior team by manager Martin O'Neill in March 2016, ahead of friendly matches against Switzerland and Slovakia, though Byrne did not feature in either game, instead returning to the Under-21 squad ahead of 2017 UEFA European Under-21 Championship Qualifying matches against Italy and Slovenia.

In March 2019, Byrne was called into the Republic of Ireland senior squad for the UEFA Euro 2020 qualifying Group D matches against Gibraltar on 23 March and Georgia on 26 March.

He was recalled to the national team in August 2019, making his international debut on 10 September 2019, coming off the bench and creating an assist in a 3–1 win over Bulgaria at the Aviva Stadium.

Byrne became the 500th Senior men's International footballer to play for Ireland, and the 64th Shamrock Rovers player to play for Ireland while still playing for the club.

He played in the 2020–21 UEFA Nations League B#Group 4 away game against Wales, becoming the first home-based Irish international to play in a competitive game since 1985.

Byrne tested positive for COVID-19 while on international duty in October 2020. His club Shamrock Rovers confirmed this while also announcing that teammate Aaron Greene had tested positive. Byrne's manager Stephen Bradley said he was "probably the worst" affected. Byrne later reported having had breathing difficulties while ill.

== Personal life ==
At the age of 11, Byrne lost his father, John.

== Career statistics ==
=== Club ===
As of match played on 12 October 2026

Appearances and goals by club, season and competition
Club	Season	League			National cup (Note: Includes the FA Cup, KNVB Cup, Scottish Cup, FAI Cup and Cypriot Cup)		League cup (Note: Includes the EFL Cup, Scottish League Cup and League of Ireland Cup)		Continental		Other		Total	
Club	Season	Division	Apps	Goals	Apps	Goals	Apps	Goals	Apps	Goals	Apps	Goals	Apps	Goals
Manchester City	2015–16	Premier League	0	0	0	0	0	0	0 (Note: Appearances in the UEFA Champions League)	0	—		0	0
Manchester City	2016–17	Premier League	0	0	0	0	0	0	0	0	—		0	0
Manchester City	Total		0	0	0	0	0	0	0	0	0	0	0	0
Cambuur (loan)	2015–16	Eredivisie	27	4	1	0	—		—		—		28	4
Blackburn Rovers (loan)	2016–17	Championship	4	0	0	0	3	0	—		—		7	0
Wigan Athletic	2016–17	Championship	2	0	0	0	0	0	—		—		2	0
Oldham Athletic (loan)	2016–17	League One	22	4	0	0	0	0	—		0 (Note: Appearances in the EFL Trophy)	0	22	4
Oldham Athletic (loan)	2017–18	League One	18	1	0	0	0	0	—		4	3	22	4
Oldham Athletic (loan)	Total		40	5	0	0	0	0	—		4	3	44	8
Kilmarnock	2018–19	Scottish Premiership	5	0	0	0	0	0	—		—		5	0
Shamrock Rovers	2019	LOI Premier Division	32	8	4	0	0	0	4 (Note: Appearances in the UEFA Europa League)	1	0 (Note: Appearances in the Leinster Senior Cup)	0	40	9
Shamrock Rovers	2020	LOI Premier Division	17	9	4	0	—		2	0	—		23	9
Shamrock Rovers	Total		49	17	8	0	0	0	6	1	0	0	63	18
APOEL	2020–21	Cypriot First Division	5	0	0	0	—		—		—		5	0
APOEL	2021–22	Cypriot First Division	0	0	0	0	—		—		—		0	0
APOEL	Total		5	0	0	0	—		—		—		5	0
Shamrock Rovers	2022	LOI Premier Division	29	2	2	0	—		7 (Note: 1 appearance in the UEFA Champions League; 2 appearances in the UEFA Europa League; 4 appearances in the UEFA Europa Conference League)	0	1 (Note: Appearance in the President of Ireland's Cup)	0	39	2
Shamrock Rovers	2023	LOI Premier Division	23	4	0	0	—		1	0	1	0	25	4
Shamrock Rovers	2024	LOI Premier Division	20	1	1	0	—		11 (Note: 3 appearances in the UEFA Champions League; 2 appearances in the UEFA Europa League; 6 appearances in the UEFA Conference League)	0	0	0	32	1
Shamrock Rovers	2025	LOI Premier Division	21	2	1	0	—		2 (Note: Appearances in the UEFA Conference League)	1	0	0	24	3
Shamrock Rovers	2026	LOI Premier Division	33	2	2	0	—		8 (Note: 4 appearances, 1 goal in the UEFA Champions League; 2 appearances, 1 goal in the UEFA Europa League; 2 appearances in the UEFA Conference League)	2	1	0	44	4
Shamrock Rovers	Total		126	11	6	0	—		29	3	3	0	164	14
Dubai Irish	2025–26	UAE Third Division League	10	1	—		—		—		—		10	1
Career total			268	38	15	0	3	0	35	4	7	3	327	45

=== International ===
As of match played 15 November 2020

Appearances and goals by national team and year
National team	Year	Apps	Goals
Republic of Ireland	2019	2	0
Republic of Ireland	2020	2	0
Total		4	0

== Honours ==
Shamrock Rovers

- League of Ireland Premier Division: 2020, 2022, 2023, 2025, 2026
- FAI Cup: 2019
- President of Ireland's Cup: 2022

Individual

- PFAI Team of the Year: 2019, 2020, 2022
- PFAI Players' Player of the Year: 2019, 2020
- FAI League Player of the Year: 2019, 2020
- FAI Under-17 International Player of the Year: 2013
- League of Ireland Player of the Month: March 2019, July 2019, February 2020, September 2020
