= Denys Arendaruk =

Ukrainian footballer

Personal information
- Full name: Denys Yevhenovych Arendaruk
- Date of birth: 16 April 1996 (age 30)
- Place of birth: Zaporizhzhia, Ukraine
- Height: 1.82 m (5 ft 11 1/2 in)
- Position: Striker

Youth career
- 2009–2010: Metalurh Zaporizhia
- 2010–2013: Shakhtar Donetsk

Senior career*
Years	Team	Apps	(Gls)
2013–2018	Shakhtar Donetsk	0	(0)
2014	→ Shakhtar-3 Donetsk	10	(1)
2018	→ Mariupol (loan)	6	(3)
2018	→ Rukh Vynnyky (loan)	3	(0)
2019	Rubikon Kyiv (amateur)	8	(1)
2020–2021	Piast Gliwice	0	(0)

International career^{‡}
2011–2012	Ukraine-16	5	(2)
2012–2013	Ukraine-17	7	(1)
2013–2014	Ukraine-18	10	(2)
2014–2015	Ukraine-19	14	(6)
2016	Ukraine-20	2	(0)
2016	Ukraine-21	4	(1)
- * Club domestic league appearances and goals as of 26 October 2021 ‡ National team caps and goals as of 26 October 2021

Denys Arendaruk (Ukrainian: Денис Євгенович Арендарук; born 16 April 1996) is a retired professional Ukrainian football striker.

== Career ==
Arendaruk is a product of the FC Metalurh and FC Shakhtar youth sportive schools.

He played for FC Shakhtar Donetsk in the Ukrainian Premier League Reserves and in February 2018 Arendaruk went on loan for another Ukrainian Premier League team, FC Mariupol, where he was promoted to the senior squad. He made his debut in the Ukrainian Premier League for Mariupol on 7 April 2018, playing as a second half-time substituted player in a losing match against FC Vorskla Poltava.

He was also a member of the different age-levels Ukraine national youth football teams.
