= Olympiacos F.C. Youth Academy =

- Full name: Ολυμπιακός Σύνδεσμος Φιλάθλων Πειραιώς (Olympiacos Club of Fans of Piraeus)
- Ground: Agios Ioannis Rentis Training Centre, Greece
- Capacity: 3,000
- Owner: Evangelos Marinakis
- Chairman: Yannis Moralis
- Website: http://www.olympiacos.org/page/1423/akademia
Home colours	Away colours	Third colours

Olympiacos F.C. Youth Academy is the football academy system of Greek professional football club Olympiacos F.C. consisting of six official youth teams (Under-10, Under-13, Under-14, Under-15, Under-17 and Under-19), based on the young athletes' age. Olympiacos have also been crowned European champions, since they won for the first time the UEFA Youth League in 2023–24.

Other age-based youth teams (e.g. Under-8) are also part of the academy, however they do not appear as official youth teams. Olympiacos' U-15, U-17 and U-20 teams all play in Greek Super League's youth competitions (Super League U-15, U-17 and U-19 respectively), while the U19 team is a regular participant in the UEFA Youth League, winning the title in 2023–24. The latter also featured in the NextGen Series, reaching the quarter-finals of the competition.

== Academy Personnel ==
As of 1 August 2026

Academy Director	(Portugal) Paulo Noga
Assistant Academy Director	(Portugal) Francisco Velez de Lima
Deputy Head of Academy	(Greece) Nikos Topoliatis
U-19 Manager	(Spain) David Rodríguez
U-19 Assistant Coach	(Greece) Anastasios Pritsas
U-19 Assistant Coach	(Greece) Nikolaos Kolokythas
U-19 Goalkeeping coach	(Greece) Filippos Bolovinis
U-19 Fitness coach	(Greece) Konstantinos Nomikos
U-17 Manager	(Greece) Anastasios Pantos
U-17 Assistant Coach	(Greece) Christos Naintos
U-17 Goalkeeping Coach	(Greece) Sokratis Kopsachilis
U-17 Fitness Coach	(Greece) Grigoris Konstantakopoulos
U-16 Manager	(Greece) Theodoros Tripotseris
U-16 Fitness coach	(Greece) Konstantinos Betsas

== Olympiacos U-19 Squad ==
As of 17 September 2021

Note: Flags indicate national team as defined under FIFA eligibility rules; some limited exceptions apply. Players may hold more than one non-FIFA nationality.

No.	Pos.	Nation	Player
-	GK	GRE	Nikos Grammatikakis
-	DF	GRE	Angelos Tsavos
-	DF	GRE	Periklis Ntellas
-	DF	GRE	Vangelis Keramidas
-	DF	GRE	Isidoros Koutsidis
-	DF	GRE	Giannis Christofilopoulos
-	DF	GRE	Nikos Freris
-	DF	GRE	Charalampos Katsogiannis
-	DF	GRE	Manolis Liofagos
-	MF	GRE	Michalis Anthis
-	MF	CYP	Titos Prokopiou

No.	Pos.	Nation	Player
-	MF	GRE	Nikos Christou
-	MF	GRE	Michalis Patiras
-	MF	GRE	Kyriakos Kyrsanidis
-	MF	GRE	Charalampos Pastras
-	MF	GRE	Giorgos Syrmis
-	FW	GRE	Dimitris Arsenidis
-	FW	GRE	Panagiotis Chaikalis
-	FW	GRE	Giannis Karakoutis
-	FW	GRE	Thanasis Papadakos
-	FW	GRE	Spyros-Marios Spyridakis

== Olympiacos U-17 Squad ==
As of 17 September 2021

Note: Flags indicate national team as defined under FIFA eligibility rules; some limited exceptions apply. Players may hold more than one non-FIFA nationality.

No.	Pos.	Nation	Player
-	GK	GRE	Konstantinos Adamopoulos
-	GK	ALB	Anxhelo Sina
-	GK	GRE	Ion Giovanidis
-	GK	GRE	Alexandros Exarchos
-	DF	GRE	Thomas Arsenidis
-	DF	GRE	Giorgos Filos
-	DF	GRE	Grigoris Savvakis
-	DF	GRE	Dimitris Nikolakoulis
-	DF	GRE	Stelios Starakis
-	DF	GRE	Kostas Kostoulas
-	DF	GRE	Vasilis Mouzakitis
-	DF	GRE	Nikos Vlassopoulos
-	DF	GRE	Panagiotis Moschos
-	DF	GRE	Michalis Gialedakis
-	MF	GRE	Christos Gatopoulos
-	MF	GRE	Antonis Papakanellos

No.	Pos.	Nation	Player
-	MF	GRE	Giannis-Klavdios Drosos
-	MF	GRE	Alexandros Evangelou
-	MF	GRE	Tasos Loupas
-	MF	GRE	Christos Alexiadis
-	MF	GRE	Paschalis Toufakis
-	MF	GRE	Athanasios Stantzos
-	MF	GRE	Vasilis Prekates
-	MF	GRE	Antonis Fanaras
-	MF	GRE	Marios Katsanevakis
-	MF	GRE	Thanasis Koutsogoulas
-	MF	GRE	Konstantinos Mavropoulos
-	FW	GRE	Giorgos-Sotiris Poimenidis
-	FW	GRE	Lampros Kakakios
-	FW	ALB	Alexandro Sufka
-	FW	GRE	Vasilis Pistikos
-	FW	GRE	Miltos Petropoulos

== Olympiacos U-15 Squad ==
As of 17 September 2021

Note: Flags indicate national team as defined under FIFA eligibility rules; some limited exceptions apply. Players may hold more than one non-FIFA nationality.

No.	Pos.	Nation	Player
-	GK	GRE	Christos Konsolakis
-	GK	GRE	Giorgos Tsirinis
-	GK	GRE	Iason Georgakopoulos
-	DF	GRE	Panagiotis Karampagias
-	DF	GRE	Nikos Kalymnios
-	DF	GRE	Apostolos Gogos
-	DF	GRE	Giorgos Ninos
-	DF	GRE	Vangelis Minis
-	MF	GRE	Angelos Mpampoulis
-	MF	BRA	Gonçalo Cunha e Silva Péres
-	MF	GRE	Errikos-Thanasis Mpadras
-	MF	GRE	Alexandros Plis
-	MF	GRE	Dimitris Roumeliotis

No.	Pos.	Nation	Player
-	MF	GRE	Konstantinos Giannakopoulos
-	MF	GRE	Stelios Chatzianoglou
-	MF	GRE	Christos-Efraim Darviras
-	MF	GRE	Giannis Vletsas
-	MF	GRE	Konstantinos Grozos
-	MF	GRE	Angelos Tzortzis
-	MF	ALB	Orgito Ruci
-	MF	GRE	Stefanos Athanasiou
-	MF	GRE	Christos Tserevelakis
-	FW	GRE	Nikostratos Zouridakis
-	FW	GRE	Vasilis Moiras
-	FW	GRE	Giannis Toulgeroglou
-	FW	GRE	Alkis Osafi

== Honours ==
The trophy of the UEFA Youth League

Titles won by Olympiacos academy's teams.

=== Olympiacos U-19 (Youth) ===
- Under-20 Intercontinental Cup: 2024 (Runners-up)
- UEFA Youth League: 2023–24
- Greek Superleague U-19: 2003-04, 2009-10, 2012-13, 2014-15, 2015-16, 2016-17, 2022-23, 2023-24, 2024-25
- U-20 Torino Tournament: 2009
- Dubai Emirates Cup: 2010
- Memoria XXVIII Torneo Juvenil: 2012

=== Olympiacos U-17 ===
- Greek Superleague U-17: 2009–10, 2010–11, 2014–15, 2016-17, 2017-18, 2018-19, 2022-23
- U-17 Shakhtar Donetsk Tournament: 2008
- U-17 Anorthosi Cyprus Tournament: 2010
- U-17 Tannenhof Cup: 2013
- U-17 Chicago Indoor Soccer League Champions: 2016

=== Olympiacos U-15 ===
- Greek Superleague U-15: 2013-14, 2015-16, 2019-20, 2021-22
- U-15 Annual Swallows Cup: 2015
- U-15 Chicago Holiday Cup Tournament: 2015

=== Amateur teams ===
- 2 EPS Piraeus cups: 1974, 2002.
- 3 Amateur National Championships: 1989, 1999, 2001.

=== Other ===
- 5 Teen National Championships: 1967, 1968, 1970, 1971, 1976.
