= Zakaria El Azzouzi =

Moroccan footballer

Personal information
- Date of birth: 7 May 1996 (age 30)
- Place of birth: Rotterdam, Netherlands
- Height: 1.78 m (5 ft 10 in)
- Position: Forward

Youth career
- DWS
- 2009–2015: Ajax

Senior career*
Years	Team	Apps	(Gls)
2015–2018	Ajax	0	(0)
2015–2017	Jong Ajax	11	(6)
2016	→ Twente (loan)	13	(4)
2016–2017	→ Sparta (loan)	21	(5)
2017–2018	→ Excelsior (loan)	17	(2)
2019	Emmen	0	(0)
2019–2021	Volendam	35	(8)
2021–2022	Brașov	18	(5)
2022–2023	Al Kharaitiyat	13	(5)
2024	Vyškov	9	(0)
Total		137	(35)

International career
2013	Morocco U17	3	(0)
- * Club domestic league appearances and goals as of 4 January 2025

Zakaria El Azzouzi (Arabic: زكريا العزوزي; born 7 May 1996) is a professional footballer who plays as a forward, most recently for Czech National Football League club MFK Vyškov. Born in the Netherlands, he has represented Morocco at youth level.

== Club career ==
El Azzouzi was born in Rotterdam. He is a youth exponent from Ajax. He made his professional debut at 21 August 2015 with Jong Ajax against NAC Breda. He played the full game, a 3–0 loss. On 22 January 2016, El Azzouzi was sent on loan to FC Twente for the rest of the season and he joined newly promoted Sparta on loan for the 2016–17 season.

He was without a club after his contract with Ajax was dissolved in December 2018.

On 7 March 2019, El Azzouzi signed a six-month contract with an option for an additional year with Emmen after being a free agent for two months. However, the club failed to register him, which meant that he did not make an official appearance during his stint at the club.

On 20 June 2019, Volendam announced that they had signed El Azzouzi as their first new addition ahead the 2019–20 season. He signed a two-year contract with an option for another year. During his unofficial debut, on 6 July against Hoofdklasse club VPV Purmersteijn, he also scored his first goal for the club.

== International career ==
El Azzouzi was born in the Netherlands to parents of Moroccan descent. He represented Morocco in the 2013 African U-17 Championship. On May 17, 2016, El Azzouzi was called up by national coach Hervé Renard for the practice international against DR Congo (May 27) and the Africa Cup qualifier with Libya (June 3). For El Azzouzi, this was the first time he had been part of Morocco's national team.

== Personal life ==
On 12 March 2015, when El Azzouzi played in the youth academy of Ajax, he was arrested along with teammates Samet Bulut and Aschraf El Mahdioui for assaulting a plainclothed policewoman. The officer suffered shoulder injuries and various bruises. She later filed charges against the three players. A day later, Ajax announced in an official message that they had suspended the players. Later that week, El Azzouzi remained the only suspect in the case. They were, however, allowed make appearances for the Ajax A1 youth side again after serving a month suspension. As punishment, he had to inform the youth players of Ajax together with Bulut and El Mahdioui.
