= FC Zenit Academy =

Coordinates: 60.0039°N 30.4106°E

FC Zenit Academy, formerly DYuSSh Smena-Zenit (Russian: ДЮСШ "Смена-Зенит") and DYuSSh Smena, is a Russian youth football academy based in Saint Petersburg. It is the youth sector of FC Zenit Saint Petersburg, and is currently headed by Dutchman Henk van Stee.

== History ==
The sports school was founded in 1957 as a football section of Central DYuSSh GORONO of Leningrad. It was reorganized into Football SDYuShOR Smena in 1968.

== Present ==
In 2008 Smena was included into club structure of FC Zenit Saint Petersburg and renamed Smena-Zenit. Since 2010 academy's main U-18 team plays the role of Zenit dissolved farm club FC Smena-Zenit, competing in the championship of Saint Petersburg as well as various international tournaments.

The list of academy's coaches includes former internationals Oleksandr Spivak and Dmitry Vasilyev.

== Alumni ==
The best known alumni of Smena are Russia national football team players Vyacheslav Malafeev, Igor Denisov, Andrey Arshavin, Vladimir Bystrov, Viktor Vasin and retired Vladislav Radimov and Oleg Salenko.
