= 2015–16 UEFA Youth League group stage =

Football tournament group stage

The 2015–16 UEFA Youth League UEFA Champions League Path (group stage) was played from 15 September to 9 December 2015. A total of 32 teams competed in the UEFA Champions League Path (group stage) to decide 16 of the 24 places in the knockout phase of the 2015–16 UEFA Youth League.

== Draw ==
The youth teams of the 32 clubs which qualified for the 2015–16 UEFA Champions League group stage entered the UEFA Champions League Path.

The 32 teams were drawn into eight groups of four. There was no separate draw held, with the group compositions identical to the draw for the 2015–16 UEFA Champions League group stage, which was held on 27 August 2015, 17:45 CEST, at the Grimaldi Forum in Monaco.

Key to colours
Group winners advanced to the round of 16
Group runners-up advanced to the play-offs

Pot 1 Team (Spain) Barcelona (England) Chelsea (Germany) Bayern Munich (Italy) Juventus (Portugal) Benfica (France) Paris Saint-Germain (Russia) Zenit Saint Petersburg (Netherlands) PSV Eindhoven	Pot 2 Team (Spain) Real Madrid (Spain) Atlético Madrid (Portugal) Porto (England) Arsenal (England) Manchester United (Spain) Valencia (Germany) Bayer Leverkusen (England) Manchester City	Pot 3 Team (Ukraine) Shakhtar Donetsk (Spain) Sevilla (France) Lyon (Ukraine) Dynamo Kyiv (Greece) Olympiacos (Russia) CSKA Moscow (Turkey) Galatasaray (Italy) Roma	Pot 4 Team (Belarus) BATE Borisov (Germany) Borussia Mönchengladbach (Germany) VfL Wolfsburg (Croatia) Dinamo Zagreb (Israel) Maccabi Tel Aviv (Belgium) Gent (Sweden) Malmö FF (Kazakhstan) Astana

== Format ==
In each group, teams played against each other home-and-away in a round-robin format. The eight group winners advanced to the round of 16, while the eight runners-up advanced to the play-offs, where they were joined by the eight second round winners from the Domestic Champions Path.

=== Tiebreakers ===
The teams were ranked according to points (3 points for a win, 1 point for a draw, 0 points for a loss). If two or more teams were equal on points on completion of the group matches, the following criteria were applied in the order given to determine the rankings (regulations Article 14.03):

1. higher number of points obtained in the group matches played among the teams in question;
2. superior goal difference from the group matches played among the teams in question;
3. higher number of goals scored in the group matches played among the teams in question;
4. higher number of goals scored away from home in the group matches played among the teams in question;
5. if, after having applied criteria 1 to 4, teams still had an equal ranking, criteria 1 to 4 were reapplied exclusively to the matches between the teams in question to determine their final rankings. If this procedure did not lead to a decision, criteria 6 to 12 applied;
6. superior goal difference in all group matches;
7. higher number of goals scored in all group matches;
8. higher number of away goals scored in all group matches;
9. higher number of wins in all group matches;
10. higher number of away wins in all group matches;
11. lower disciplinary points total based only on yellow and red cards received in all group matches (red card = 3 points, yellow card = 1 point, expulsion for two yellow cards in one match = 3 points);
12. drawing of lots.

== Groups ==
The matchdays were 15–16 September, 29–30 September, 20–21 October, 3–4 November, 24–25 November, and 8–9 December 2015. Times up to 24 October 2015 (matchdays 1–3) were CEST (UTC+2), thereafter (matchdays 4–6) times were CET (UTC+1).

=== Group A ===
Pos	Team	Pld	W	D	L	GF	GA	GD	Pts	Qualification	PAR	RMA	MAL	SHK
1	(France) Paris Saint-Germain	6	4	1	1	16	6	+10	13	Advance to round of 16	—	4–1	0–0	5–2
2	(Spain) Real Madrid	6	4	0	2	16	7	+9	12	Advance to play-offs	2–0	—	3–0	4–0
3	(Sweden) Malmö FF	6	1	2	3	7	14	−7	5		0–3	1–0	—	5–5
4	(Ukraine) Shakhtar Donetsk	6	1	1	4	13	25	−12	4		1–4	2–6	3–1	—

Source: UEFA
15 September 2015
15:00

Paris Saint-Germain (France)	0–0	(Sweden) Malmö FF
	Report

Stade Municipal Georges Lefèvre, Saint-Germain-en-Laye
Attendance: 410
Referee: Sven Bindels (Luxembourg)
15 September 2015
16:00

Real Madrid (Spain)	4–0	(Ukraine) Shakhtar Donetsk
Hakimi 28'; Cedrés 32'; Febas 59'; Salto 83'	Report

Alfredo di Stéfano, Madrid
Attendance: 473
Referee: Tiago Martins (Portugal)

30 September 2015
13:00

Shakhtar Donetsk (Ukraine)	1–4	(France) Paris Saint-Germain
Zubkov 73'	Report	Augustin 6', 81'; Doucouré 44'; Pereira de Sa 53' (pen.)

Medyk Stadium, Morshyn
Attendance: 830
Referee: Vadims Direktorenko (Latvia)
30 September 2015
15:30

Malmö FF (Sweden)	1–0	(Spain) Real Madrid
Redzic 88'	Report

Malmö IP, Malmö
Referee: Jari Järvinen (Finland)

21 October 2015
14:00

Paris Saint-Germain (France)	4–1	(Spain) Real Madrid
Eboa Eboa 40'; Nkunku 51', 83'; Pereira de Sa 90+3'	Report	Febas 57'

Stade Municipal Georges Lefèvre, Saint-Germain-en-Laye
Attendance: 400
Referee: Andris Treimanis (Latvia)
21 October 2015
15:30

Malmö FF (Sweden)	5–5	(Ukraine) Shakhtar Donetsk
Bergqvist 16'; Stojanovic-Fredin 27'; M. Andersson 46'; Hadzikadunic 59'; Boryachuk 80' (o.g.)	Report	Topalov 13'; Zubkov 53'; Arabidze 61'; Boryachuk 62'; Pikhalyonok 87'

Malmö IP, Malmö
Referee: Svein-Erik Edvartsen (Norway)

3 November 2015
13:00

Shakhtar Donetsk (Ukraine)	3–1	(Sweden) Malmö FF
Buhay 40'; Pikhalyonok 65' (pen.); Avahimyan 84'	Report	Redzic 17'

Medyk Stadium, Morshyn
Attendance: 812
Referee: Sergey Tsinkevich (Belarus)
3 November 2015
14:00

Real Madrid (Spain)	2–0	(France) Paris Saint-Germain
Lazo 22'; Mayoral 57'	Report

Alfredo di Stéfano, Madrid
Attendance: 392
Referee: Mohammed Al-Hakim (Sweden)

25 November 2015
12:00

Shakhtar Donetsk (Ukraine)	2–6	(Spain) Real Madrid
Zubkov 23'; Boryachuk 73'	Report	Cedrés 9', 79', 81'; Lazo 26'; Mayoral 59', 86'

Medyk Stadium, Morshyn
Attendance: 812
Referee: Lasha Silagava (Georgia)
25 November 2015
15:30

Malmö FF (Sweden)	0–3	(France) Paris Saint-Germain
	Report	Meïté 12'; Pereira de Sa 19'; Edouard 90+5'

Malmö IP, Malmö
Referee: Antti Munukka (Finland)

8 December 2015
16:00

Paris Saint-Germain (France)	5–2	(Ukraine) Shakhtar Donetsk
Augustin 10'; Ikoné 58'; Meïté 64'; Edouard 76', 82'	Report	Pikhalyonok 37'; Topalov 78'

Stade Municipal Georges Lefèvre, Saint-Germain-en-Laye
Attendance: 208
Referee: Petr Ardeleánu (Czech Republic)
8 December 2015
16:00

Real Madrid (Spain)	3–0	(Sweden) Malmö FF
Rivero 12', 59' (pen.); Manu 77'	Report

Alfredo di Stéfano, Madrid
Attendance: 686
Referee: Ádám Farkas (Hungary)

=== Group B ===
Pos	Team	Pld	W	D	L	GF	GA	GD	Pts	Qualification	PSV	CSKA	MUN	WOL
1	(Netherlands) PSV Eindhoven	6	3	1	2	10	9	+1	10	Advance to round of 16	—	2–1	0–3	2–1
2	(Russia) CSKA Moscow	6	2	2	2	10	6	+4	8 (Note: Ranked by head-to-head record (CSKA Moscow: 4 pts; Manchester United: 1 pt).)	Advance to play-offs	0–0	—	4–0	1–2
3	(England) Manchester United	6	2	2	2	6	10	−4	8		0–5	0–0	—	1–1
4	(Germany) VfL Wolfsburg	6	2	1	3	10	11	−1	7		4–1	2–4	0–2	—

Source: UEFA
Notes:
15 September 2015
14:00

PSV Eindhoven (Netherlands)	0–3	(England) Manchester United
	Report	Gribbin 28'; Rashford 47' (pen.), 67'

De Herdgang, Eindhoven
Referee: Erik Lambrechts (Belgium)
15 September 2015
16:00

VfL Wolfsburg (Germany)	2–4	(Russia) CSKA Moscow
Putaro 11', 19'	Report	Solovyov 54'; Zhamaletdinov 66'; Chalov 67'; Makarov 80'

AOK Stadion, Wolfsburg
Referee: Danilo Grujić (Serbia)

30 September 2015
13:00

CSKA Moscow (Russia)	0–0	(Netherlands) PSV Eindhoven
	Report

Oktyabr Stadium, Moscow
Referee: Dumitri Muntean (Moldova)
30 September 2015
16:00

Manchester United (England)	1–1	(Germany) VfL Wolfsburg
Rashford 22' (pen.)	Report	Donkor 61'

Leigh Sports Village, Leigh
Attendance: 510
Referee: Tore Hansen (Norway)

21 October 2015
13:00

CSKA Moscow (Russia)	4–0	(England) Manchester United
Zhamaletdinov 14' (pen.), 55' (pen.); Makarov 45'; Gordyushenko 88'	Report

Oktyabr Stadium, Moscow
Referee: Alexandru Tean (Moldova)
21 October 2015
16:00

VfL Wolfsburg (Germany)	4–1	(Netherlands) PSV Eindhoven
Ziegele 8'; Putaro 41' (pen.); Vojic 75'; Condé 90+1'	Report	Lundqvist 13'

AOK Stadion, Wolfsburg
Referee: Adrien Jaccottet (Switzerland)

3 November 2015
15:00

Manchester United (England)	0–0	(Russia) CSKA Moscow
	Report

Leigh Sports Village, Leigh
Attendance: 545
Referee: Bryn Markham-Jones (Wales)
3 November 2015
16:00

PSV Eindhoven (Netherlands)	2–1	(Germany) VfL Wolfsburg
Lammers 63'; Konings 90+3'	Report	Putaro 90'

De Herdgang, Eindhoven
Referee: Marius Avram (Romania)

25 November 2015
12:00

CSKA Moscow (Russia)	1–2	(Germany) VfL Wolfsburg
Kuchaev 55'	Report	Donkor 3'; Putaro 39'

Oktyabr Stadium, Moscow
Referee: Suren Baliyan (Armenia)
25 November 2015
15:00

Manchester United (England)	0–5	(Netherlands) PSV Eindhoven
	Report	Guðmundsson 13'; Lundqvist 21'; Abels 37'; Lammers 66'; Konings 83'

Leigh Sports Village, Leigh
Attendance: 444
Referee: Vilhjalmur Thorarinsson (Iceland)

8 December 2015
16:00

VfL Wolfsburg (Germany)	0–2	(England) Manchester United
	Report	Tuanzebe 43'; Kehinde 56'

AOK Stadion, Wolfsburg
Referee: Bartosz Frankowski (Poland)
8 December 2015
16:00

PSV Eindhoven (Netherlands)	2–1	(Russia) CSKA Moscow
Lundqvist 18'; Guðmundsson 33'	Report	Zhamaletdinov 25'

De Herdgang, Eindhoven
Referee: Ken Henry Johnsen (Norway)

=== Group C ===
Pos	Team	Pld	W	D	L	GF	GA	GD	Pts	Qualification	BEN	ATM	GAL	AST
1	(Portugal) Benfica	6	5	1	0	29	3	+26	16	Advance to round of 16	—	1–1	2–0	8–0
2	(Spain) Atlético Madrid	6	4	1	1	25	5	+20	13	Advance to play-offs	1–2	—	4–0	7–1
3	(Turkey) Galatasaray	6	2	0	4	8	20	−12	6		1–11	1–3	—	3–0
4	(Kazakhstan) Astana	6	0	0	6	1	35	−34	0		0–5	0–9	0–3	—

Source: UEFA
15 September 2015
15:00

Galatasaray (Turkey)	1–3	(Spain) Atlético Madrid
Davas 41'	Report	Roberto 75', 78'; Ferni 80'

Bahçelievler İl Özel İdare Stadı, Istanbul
Referee: Eitan Shmuelevitz (Israel)
15 September 2015
16:00

Benfica (Portugal)	8–0	(Kazakhstan) Astana
Gonçalves 10', 26', 55'; Gomes 21', 34'; Rodrigues 36'; H. Pereira 42', 78'	Report

Caixa Futebol Campus, Seixal
Attendance: 580
Referee: Padraig Sutton (Republic of Ireland)

30 September 2015
11:00

Astana (Kazakhstan)	0–3	(Turkey) Galatasaray
	Report	Çalışkan 11'; Yeşilyurt 77'; Davas 80'

Kazhymukan Munaitpasov Stadium, Astana
Referee: Mikhail Vilkov (Russia)
30 September 2015
12:00

Atlético Madrid (Spain)	1–2	(Portugal) Benfica
Moreno 77'	Report	Carvalho 35'; Gonçalves 89'

Ciudad Deportiva Cerro del Espino, Majadahonda
Referee: Sven Bindels (Luxembourg)

21 October 2015
12:00

Atlético Madrid (Spain)	7–1	(Kazakhstan) Astana
Roberto 15', 30'; Moreno 24', 36' (pen.); Hernandez 27'; Bare 57'; Salomón 75'	Report	Kuanyshbay 22'

Ciudad Deportiva Cerro del Espino, Majadahonda
Referee: Nicolas Laforge (Belgium)
21 October 2015
13:00

Galatasaray (Turkey)	1–11	(Portugal) Benfica
İşsever 17' (pen.)	Report	Gonçalves 24', 34', 58'; Gomes 27', 63', 65'; Sanches 33'; Carvalho 72', 90+1' (pen.); H. Pereira 76'; Ferro 78'

Bahçelievler İl Özel İdare Stadı, Istanbul
Referee: Enea Jorgji (Albania)

3 November 2015
08:00

Astana (Kazakhstan)	0–9	(Spain) Atlético Madrid
	Report	Heras 6'; Roberto 28', 57', 57', 84'; Mohedano 45'; Hernandez 52'; Almagro 59'; Carlos Isaac 79'

Astana Arena, Astana
Referee: Vitali Meshkov (Russia)
3 November 2015
14:00

Benfica (Portugal)	2–0	(Turkey) Galatasaray
Sarkic 24'; Carvalho 60'	Report

Caixa Futebol Campus, Seixal
Attendance: 475
Referee: Alain Bieri (Switzerland)

25 November 2015
08:00

Astana (Kazakhstan)	0–5	(Portugal) Benfica
	Report	Gomes 28', 72' (pen.); Assylkhanuly 73' (o.g.); Araújo 90', 90+3'

Astana Arena, Astana
Attendance: 17,000
Referee: Oleksandr Derdo (Ukraine)
25 November 2015
12:00

Atlético Madrid (Spain)	4–0	(Turkey) Galatasaray
Moya 32', 50'; Ferni 48'; Roberto 90+1'	Report

Ciudad Deportiva Cerro del Espino, Majadahonda
Referee: Sebastian Colţescu (Romania)

8 December 2015
13:00

Galatasaray (Turkey)	3–0	(Kazakhstan) Astana
İşsever 36', 42'; Çalışkan 37'	Report

Bahçelievler İl Özel İdare Stadı, Istanbul
Referee: Giorgi Kruashvili (Georgia)
8 December 2015
16:00

Benfica (Portugal)	1–1	(Spain) Atlético Madrid
Hernandez 61' (o.g.)	Report	Ferni 63'

Caixa Futebol Campus, Seixal
Attendance: 1,436
Referee: Bastian Dankert (Germany)

=== Group D ===
Pos	Team	Pld	W	D	L	GF	GA	GD	Pts	Qualification	MCI	SEV	JUV	BMG
1	(England) Manchester City	6	3	2	1	11	6	+5	11 (Note: Ranked by head-to-head record (Manchester City: 4 pts; Sevilla: 1 pt).)	Advance to round of 16	—	1–1	4–1	1–1
2	(Spain) Sevilla	6	3	2	1	9	7	+2	11	Advance to play-offs	0–2	—	1–0	4–2
3	(Italy) Juventus	6	2	0	4	7	11	−4	6		2–1	0–1	—	2–1
4	(Germany) Borussia Mönchengladbach	6	1	2	3	10	13	−3	5		1–2	2–2	3–2	—

Source: UEFA
Notes:
15 September 2015
16:00

Sevilla (Spain)	4–2	(Germany) Borussia Mönchengladbach
Colmenero 13'; Falcón 20'; Romero 83', 90+4'	Report	Holtby 43'; Simakala 58'

Ciudad Deportiva José Ramón Cisneros Palacios, Seville
Referee: Fabio Verssimo (Portugal)
15 September 2015
18:00

Manchester City (England)	4–1	(Italy) Juventus
Nemane 22'; Roberts 52'; Patching 87'; Nmecha 90+5'	Report	Favilli 9'

Etihad Campus, Manchester
Attendance: 2,109
Referee: Andrew Dallas (Scotland)

30 September 2015
13:00

Borussia Mönchengladbach (Germany)	1–2	(England) Manchester City
Simakala 1'	Report	Patching 62'; Nemane 70'

Fohlenplatz, Mönchengladbach
Referee: Dominik Ouschan (Austria)
30 September 2015
14:00

Juventus (Italy)	0–1	(Spain) Sevilla
	Report	Shved 24'

Stadio Silvio Piola, Vercelli
Referee: Nikola Dabanović (Montenegro)

21 October 2015
14:30

Juventus (Italy)	2–1	(Germany) Borussia Mönchengladbach
Clemenza 38', 90'	Report	Eckert 48'

Stadio Silvio Piola, Vercelli
Referee: Milan Ilić (Serbia)
21 October 2015
18:00

Manchester City (England)	1–1	(Spain) Sevilla
Ambrose 31'	Report	Martín 80'

Etihad Campus, Manchester
Attendance: 1,808
Referee: Rob Rogers (Republic of Ireland)

3 November 2015
13:30

Borussia Mönchengladbach (Germany)	3–2	(Italy) Juventus
Ndenge 4' (pen.), 35'; Holtby 51'	Report	Cassata 90'; Kastanos 90+2'

Fohlenplatz, Mönchengladbach
Referee: Barış Şimşek (Turkey)
3 November 2015
14:00

Sevilla (Spain)	0–2	(England) Manchester City
	Report	Ambrose 20', 90'

Estadio Municipal Manuel Leonardo Ventura, Pilas
Referee: Tiago Martins (Portugal)

25 November 2015
14:00

Juventus (Italy)	2–1	(England) Manchester City
Kastanos 27', 60'	Report	Ambrose 90+2'

Stadio Silvio Piola, Vercelli
Referee: Daniel Stefański (Poland)
25 November 2015
14:00

Borussia Mönchengladbach (Germany)	2–2	(Spain) Sevilla
Eckert 55'; Ndenge 89'	Report	Curro 26'; Amo 50'

Fohlenplatz, Mönchengladbach
Referee: Domagoj Vučkov (Croatia)

8 December 2015
14:00

Manchester City (England)	1–1	(Germany) Borussia Mönchengladbach
Brahim 45+2'	Report	Ndenge 20' (pen.)

Etihad Campus, Manchester
Attendance: 1,007
Referee: Sergejus Slyva (Lithuania)
8 December 2015
14:00

Sevilla (Spain)	1–0	(Italy) Juventus
Curro 57'	Report

Estadio Municipal Manuel Leonardo Ventura, Pilas
Referee: Hugo Miguel (Portugal)

=== Group E ===
Pos	Team	Pld	W	D	L	GF	GA	GD	Pts	Qualification	BAR	ROM	LEV	BATE
1	(Spain) Barcelona	6	3	3	0	10	4	+6	12	Advance to round of 16	—	3–3	1–1	2–0
2	(Italy) Roma	6	2	3	1	12	6	+6	9	Advance to play-offs	0–0	—	5–1	3–0
3	(Germany) Bayer Leverkusen	6	2	2	2	6	9	−3	8		0–1	2–1	—	1–0
4	(Belarus) BATE Borisov	6	0	2	4	1	10	−9	2		0–3	0–0	1–1	—

Source: UEFA
16 September 2015
14:00

Bayer Leverkusen (Germany)	1–0	(Belarus) BATE Borisov
Henrichs 72'	Report

Ulrich Haberland Stadion, Leverkusen
Referee: Mads-Kristoffer Kristoffersen (Denmark)
16 September 2015
16:00

Roma (Italy)	0–0	(Spain) Barcelona
	Report

Campo Agostino Di Bartolomei, Rome
Referee: Ali Palabıyık (Turkey)

29 September 2015
15:00

BATE Borisov (Belarus)	0–0	(Italy) Roma
	Report

Haradski Stadium, Barysaw
Referee: Roomer Tarajev (Estonia)
29 September 2015
16:00

Barcelona (Spain)	1–1	(Germany) Bayer Leverkusen
Montes 72'	Report	Gemein 89'

Mini Estadi, Barcelona
Attendance: 298
Referee: Paul Mclaughlin (Republic of Ireland)

20 October 2015
15:00

BATE Borisov (Belarus)	0–3	(Spain) Barcelona
	Report	Chendri 21'; Pérez 71'; Aleñá 75'

Haradski Stadium, Barysaw
Referee: Yaroslav Kozyk (Ukraine)
20 October 2015
16:00

Bayer Leverkusen (Germany)	2–1	(Italy) Roma
Frey 38'; Džalto 90+3'	Report	Ponce 55'

Ulrich Haberland Stadion, Leverkusen
Referee: Alain Durieux (Luxembourg)

4 November 2015
14:00

Roma (Italy)	5–1	(Germany) Bayer Leverkusen
D'Urso 6', 84'; Sadiq 27', 34', 57'	Report	Džalto 83'

Campo Agostino Di Bartolomei, Rome
Referee: Mitja Žganec (Slovenia)
4 November 2015
16:00

Barcelona (Spain)	2–0	(Belarus) BATE Borisov
Aleñá 20', 52'	Report

Mini Estadi, Barcelona
Attendance: 264
Referee: Padraig Sutton (Republic of Ireland)

24 November 2015
12:00

Barcelona (Spain)	3–3	(Italy) Roma
Tur 21'; Aleñá 23', 40'	Report	Ponce 45+3', 86'; Marchizza 65' (pen.)

Mini Estadi, Barcelona
Attendance: 1,075
Referee: Eitan Shmuelevitz (Israel)
24 November 2015
13:00

BATE Borisov (Belarus)	1–1	(Germany) Bayer Leverkusen
Antilevsky 45'	Report	Cigaņiks 57' (pen.)

Haradski Stadium, Barysaw
Referee: Peter Kralović (Slovakia)

9 December 2015
14:30

Bayer Leverkusen (Germany)	0–1	(Spain) Barcelona
	Report	Blanco 89'

Ulrich Haberland Stadion, Leverkusen
Referee: Edin Jakupović (Bosnia and Herzegovina)
9 December 2015
14:30

Roma (Italy)	3–0	(Belarus) BATE Borisov
Soleri 23', 78'; Sadiq 75'	Report

Campo Agostino Di Bartolomei, Rome
Referee: Nikola Popov (Bulgaria)

=== Group F ===
Pos	Team	Pld	W	D	L	GF	GA	GD	Pts	Qualification	DZG	ARS	OLY	BAY
1	(Croatia) Dinamo Zagreb	6	3	1	2	9	8	+1	10 (Note: Ranked by head-to-head record (Dinamo Zagreb: 7 pts; Arsenal: 6 pts; Olympiacos: 4 pts).)	Advance to round of 16	—	0–2	2–2	0–1
2	(England) Arsenal	6	3	1	2	9	7	+2	10	Advance to play-offs	1–2	—	3–2	2–0
3	(Greece) Olympiacos	6	3	1	2	9	8	+1	10		1–3	2–0	—	1–0
4	(Germany) Bayern Munich	6	1	1	4	3	7	−4	4		1–2	1–1	0–1	—

Source: UEFA
Notes:
16 September 2015
11:00

Olympiacos (Greece)	1–0	(Germany) Bayern Munich
Saliakas 82' (pen.)	Report

Renti Training Centre, Piraeus
Attendance: 310
Referee: Adrian Azzopardi (Malta)
16 September 2015
16:00

Dinamo Zagreb (Croatia)	0–2	(England) Arsenal
	Report	Willock 43'; Sheaf 66' (pen.)

Stadion Hitrec-Kacian, Zagreb
Attendance: 3,268
Referee: Edin Jakupovic (Bosnia and Herzegovina)

29 September 2015
14:00

Bayern Munich (Germany)	1–2	(Croatia) Dinamo Zagreb
Strein 84'	Report	Božić 5' (pen.); Brekalo 18'

Grünwalder Stadion, Munich
Attendance: 700
Referee: Bojan Pandžić (Sweden)
29 September 2015
15:00

Arsenal (England)	3–2	(Greece) Olympiacos
Pleguezuelo 14', 63'; Sheaf 49' (pen.)	Report	Manthatis 7'; Androutsos 51'

Meadow Park, Borehamwood
Attendance: 464
Referee: Thorvaldur Árnason (Iceland)

20 October 2015
14:00

Arsenal (England)	2–0	(Germany) Bayern Munich
Iwobi 74', 78'	Report

Meadow Park, Borehamwood
Attendance: 847
Referee: Jonathan Lardot (Belgium)
20 October 2015
15:00

Dinamo Zagreb (Croatia)	2–2	(Greece) Olympiacos
Čabraja 84'; Olmo 90+3'	Report	Saliakas 25' (pen.); Chantzaras 73'

Stadion Hitrec-Kacian, Zagreb
Attendance: 1,100
Referee: Nikolai Yordanov (Bulgaria)

4 November 2015
14:00

Bayern Munich (Germany)	1–1	(England) Arsenal
Benko 10'	Report	Bennacer 38'

Grünwalder Stadion, Munich
Attendance: 320
Referee: Anatoliy Abdula (Ukraine)
4 November 2015
18:00

Olympiacos (Greece)	1–3	(Croatia) Dinamo Zagreb
Megaritis 56'	Report	Božić 2'; Gojak 11', 85'

Renti Training Centre, Piraeus
Attendance: 450
Referee: Vasilis Dimitriou (Cyprus)

24 November 2015
14:00

Bayern Munich (Germany)	0–1	(Greece) Olympiacos
	Report	Manthatis 50'

Grünwalder Stadion, Munich
Attendance: 501
Referee: Danilo Grujić (Serbia)
24 November 2015
15:00

Arsenal (England)	1–2	(Croatia) Dinamo Zagreb
Mavididi 78'	Report	Brekalo 54'; Gojak 69'

Meadow Park, Borehamwood
Attendance: 473
Referee: Paul Mclaughlin (Republic of Ireland)

9 December 2015
14:00

Dinamo Zagreb (Croatia)	0–1	(Germany) Bayern Munich
	Report	Stefandl 74'

Stadion Hitrec-Kacian, Zagreb
Attendance: 2,060
Referee: Alexander Harkam (Austria)
9 December 2015
17:00

Olympiacos (Greece)	2–0	(England) Arsenal
Manthatis 11'; Chantzaras 37'	Report

Renti Training Centre, Piraeus
Attendance: 500
Referee: Roi Reinshreiber (Israel)

=== Group G ===
Pos	Team	Pld	W	D	L	GF	GA	GD	Pts	Qualification	CHE	DKV	POR	MTA
1	(England) Chelsea	6	4	2	0	15	4	+11	14	Advance to round of 16	—	3–1	0–0	3–0
2	(Ukraine) Dynamo Kyiv	6	3	1	2	7	7	0	10	Advance to play-offs	0–2	—	2–1	2–0
3	(Portugal) Porto	6	2	2	2	8	7	+1	8		3–3	0–1	—	2–0
4	(Israel) Maccabi Tel Aviv	6	0	1	5	2	14	−12	1		0–4	1–1	1–2	—

Source: UEFA
16 September 2015
13:00

Dynamo Kyiv (Ukraine)	2–1	(Portugal) Porto
Taranukha 43'; Smyrnyi 80'	Report	Jorge 3'

Valeriy Lobanovskyi Dynamo Stadium, Kyiv
Attendance: 3,000
Referee: Aleksandrs Anufrijevs (Latvia)
16 September 2015
14:05

Chelsea (England)	3–0	(Israel) Maccabi Tel Aviv
Palmer 20', 47'; Abraham 78'	Report

Cobham Training Centre, Stoke d'Abernon
Attendance: 150
Referee: Ola Hobber Nilsen (Norway)

29 September 2015
12:00

Maccabi Tel Aviv (Israel)	1–1	(Ukraine) Dynamo Kyiv
Kanichowsky 24'	Report	Mykhaylychenko 21'

Grundman Stadium, Ramat HaSharon
Attendance: 800
Referee: Dimitrios Massias (Cyprus)
29 September 2015
14:00

Porto (Portugal)	3–3	(England) Chelsea
Cardoso 35' (pen.); Djim 52'; Macedo 71'	Report	Palmer 9'; Quintero 17'; Scott 26'

CTFD PortoGaia, Vila Nova de Gaia
Attendance: 426
Referee: Juan Martínez Munuera (Spain)

20 October 2015
13:00

Dynamo Kyiv (Ukraine)	0–2	(England) Chelsea
	Report	Abraham 13', 72'

Valeriy Lobanovskyi Dynamo Stadium, Kyiv
Attendance: 1,500
Referee: Ján Valášek (Slovakia)
20 October 2015
14:00

Porto (Portugal)	2–0	(Israel) Maccabi Tel Aviv
Vaturi 6' (o.g.); Cardoso 85' (pen.)	Report

CTFD PortoGaia, Vila Nova de Gaia
Attendance: 377
Referee: Nikolaj Hänni (Switzerland)

4 November 2015
13:00

Maccabi Tel Aviv (Israel)	1–2	(Portugal) Porto
Altman 44'	Report	Morais 17'; Rui Pedro 40'

Bloomfield Stadium, Tel Aviv
Attendance: 432
Referee: Vlado Glodjović (Serbia)
4 November 2015
14:00

Chelsea (England)	3–1	(Ukraine) Dynamo Kyiv
Muheim 25'; Abraham 57', 90+4'	Report	Schebetun 46'

Cobham Training Centre, Stoke d'Abernon
Attendance: 100
Referee: Mads-Kristoffer Kristoffersen (Denmark)

24 November 2015
13:00

Maccabi Tel Aviv (Israel)	0–4	(England) Chelsea
	Report	Abraham 16' (pen.), 86'; Wakefield 19'; Scott 39'

Netanya Stadium, Netanya
Attendance: 1,028
Referee: Charalambos Kalogeropoulos (Greece)
24 November 2015
14:00

Porto (Portugal)	0–1	(Ukraine) Dynamo Kyiv
	Report	Schebetun 69'

CTFD PortoGaia, Vila Nova de Gaia
Attendance: 310
Referee: Erik Lambrechts (Belgium)

9 December 2015
13:00

Dynamo Kyiv (Ukraine)	2–0	(Israel) Maccabi Tel Aviv
Kaliuzhnyi 20'; Tsygankov 72'	Report

Valeriy Lobanovskyi Dynamo Stadium, Kyiv
Attendance: 1,000
Referee: Nikola Dabanović (Montenegro)
9 December 2015
14:00

Chelsea (England)	0–0	(Portugal) Porto
	Report

Cobham Training Centre, Stoke d'Abernon
Attendance: 128
Referee: Gunnar Jarl Jónsson (Iceland)

=== Group H ===
Pos	Team	Pld	W	D	L	GF	GA	GD	Pts	Qualification	LYO	VAL	ZEN	GNT
1	(France) Lyon	6	4	1	1	16	4	+12	13 (Note: Ranked by head-to-head record (Lyon: 4 pts; Valencia: 1 pt).)	Advance to round of 16	—	1–0	6–0	4–0
2	(Spain) Valencia	6	4	1	1	13	3	+10	13	Advance to play-offs	1–1	—	2–0	5–1
3	(Russia) Zenit Saint Petersburg	6	2	0	4	5	11	−6	6		3–1	0–1	—	0–1
4	(Belgium) Gent	6	1	0	5	2	18	−16	3		0–3	0–4	0–2	—

Source: UEFA
Notes:
16 September 2015
14:00

Gent (Belgium)	0–3	(France) Lyon
	Report	Del Castillo 10', 63'; Ankoué 72'

PGB-stadion, Ghent
Referee: Mitja Žganec (Slovenia)
16 September 2015
16:00

Valencia (Spain)	2–0	(Russia) Zenit Saint Petersburg
Soler 29'; Mir 75'	Report

Antonio Puchades – Ciudad Deportiva de Paterna, Paterna
Referee: Alain Durieux (Luxembourg)

29 September 2015
10:00

Zenit Saint Petersburg (Russia)	0–1	(Belgium) Gent
	Report	Callebaut 50'

Minor Sport Arena Petrovsky, Saint Petersburg
Referee: Ville Nevalainen (Finland)
29 September 2015
14:00

Lyon (France)	1–0	(Spain) Valencia
Martelat 63'	Report

Plaine des Jeux de Gerland, Lyon
Referee: Sascha Amhof (Switzerland)

20 October 2015
10:00

Zenit Saint Petersburg (Russia)	3–1	(France) Lyon
Kubyshkin 36'; Andreyev 44'; Nazimov 63'	Report	Roselli 86'

Minor Sport Arena Petrovsky, Saint Petersburg
Referee: Aliyar Aghayev (Azerbaijan)
20 October 2015
16:00

Valencia (Spain)	5–1	(Belgium) Gent
T. Martínez 10'; Mir 42', 88'; Soler 64'; Gómez 82'	Report	Walen 67'

Antonio Puchades – Ciudad Deportiva de Paterna, Paterna
Referee: Amaury Delerue (France)

4 November 2015
14:00

Gent (Belgium)	0–4	(Spain) Valencia
	Report	I. Martínez 17'; Mir 34', 69'; Gómez 88'

PGB-stadion, Ghent
Referee: Ola Hobber Nilsen (Norway)
4 November 2015
15:00

Lyon (France)	6–0	(Russia) Zenit Saint Petersburg
Martins 1'; Perrin 25', 74'; Del Castillo 34' (pen.); Cognat 38'; Martelat 72'	Report

Plaine des Jeux de Gerland, Lyon
Referee: Laurent Kopriwa (Luxembourg)

24 November 2015
09:00

Zenit Saint Petersburg (Russia)	0–1	(Spain) Valencia
	Report	Shalimov 73' (o.g.)

Minor Sport Arena Petrovsky, Saint Petersburg
Referee: Orkhan Mammadov (Azerbaijan)
24 November 2015
14:00

Lyon (France)	4–0	(Belgium) Gent
Martins 18', 59'; Perrin 20', 58'	Report

Plaine des Jeux de Gerland, Lyon
Referee: Dimitar Meckarovski (Macedonia)

9 December 2015
14:00

Valencia (Spain)	1–1	(France) Lyon
Mir 68'	Report	Kalulu 76'

Antonio Puchades – Ciudad Deportiva de Paterna, Paterna
Referee: Ali Palabıyık (Turkey)
9 December 2015
14:00

Gent (Belgium)	0–2	(Russia) Zenit Saint Petersburg
	Report	Ponikarov 62'; Ivanov 65'

PGB-stadion, Ghent
Referee: Eiko Saar (Estonia)
