= 2015–16 in Croatian football =

Football in Croatia
- Season: 2015–16

Men's football
- Prva HNL: Dinamo Zagreb
- Druga HNL: Cibalia
- Treća HNL: Novigrad (West); Solin (South); Međimurje (East)
- Croatian Cup: Dinamo Zagreb

The following article presents a summary of the 2015–16 football season in Croatia, which will be the 25th season of competitive football in the country.

== National teams ==
=== Croatia ===
Date	Venue	Opponents	Score	Croatia scorer(s)	Report
UEFA Euro 2016 qualifying - Group stage
3 September 2015	Tofiq Bahramov Stadium, Baku	Azerbaijan	0–0		UEFA.com
6 September 2015	Ullevaal Stadion, Oslo	Norway	0–2		UEFA.com
10 October 2015	Stadion Maksimir, Zagreb	Bulgaria	3–0	Perišić, Rakitić, Kalinić	UEFA.com
13 October 2015	Ta' Qali National Stadium, Ta' Qali	Malta	1–0	Perišić	UEFA.com
Friendly fixtures
17 November 2015	Olimp-2, Rostov on Don	Russia	3–1	Kalinić, Brozović, Mandžukić	HNS-CFF.hr
23 March 2016	Stadion Gradski vrt, Osijek	Israel	2–0	Perišić, Brozović	HNS-CFF.hr
26 March 2016	Groupama Arena, Budapest	Hungary	1–1	Mandžukić	HNS-CFF.hr
27 May 2016	Gradski stadion, Koprivnica	Moldova	1–0	Kramarić	
4 June 2016	Stadion Rujevica, Rijeka	San Marino	10–0	Pjaca, Mandžukić (3), Srna, Perišić, Rakitić, Kalinić (3)	

=== Croatia U21 ===
Date	Venue	Opponents	Score	Croatia scorer(s)	Report
2017 UEFA European Under-21 Championship qualification - Group stage
3 September 2015	Gradski stadion, Koprivnica	Georgia	1–0	Milić	UEFA.com
7 September 2015	Tamme Stadium, Tartu	Estonia	4–0	Milić, Pašalić (2), Radošević	UEFA.com
7 October 2015	San Marino Stadium, Serravalle	San Marino	3–0	Marić (2), Pašalić	UEFA.com
11 November 2015	Stadion Šubićevac, Šibenik	San Marino	4–0	Halilović, Milić, Perić, Pjaca	UEFA.com
17 November 2015	Stadion Rujevica, Rijeka	Spain	2–3	Pašalić, Radošević	UEFA.com
24 March 2016	Estadio El Plantío, Burgos	Spain	3–0	Ćaleta-Car, Perica (2)	UEFA.com
28 March 2016	Stadion ŠRC Zaprešić, Zaprešić	Estonia	2–1	Pavičić, Perica	UEFA.com
Friendly fixtures
12 October 2015	Stadion ŠRC Zaprešić, Zaprešić	Russia	3–4	Radošević (2), Dangubić	HNS-CFF.hr

=== Croatia U19 ===
Date	Venue	Opponents	Score	Croatia scorer(s)	Report
2016 UEFA European Under-19 Championship qualification - Qualifying round
18 November 2015	Stadion Veruda, Pula	Montenegro	3–1	Matić, Božić	UEFA.com
20 November 2015	Stadion Veli Jože, Poreč	Kazakhstan	1–0	Brekalo	UEFA.com
23 November 2015	Stadion Veruda, Pula	Hungary	1–1	Knežević	UEFA.com
2016 UEFA European Under-19 Championship qualification - Elite round
23 March 2016	Stadion Kantrida, Rijeka	Bulgaria	1–0	Brekalo	UEFA.com
25 March 2016	Stadion Kantrida, Rijeka	Scotland	3–0	Brodić, Turčin, Brekalo	UEFA.com
28 March 2016	Stadion Rujevica, Rijeka	Belgium	4–0	Benković, Brodić, Lovren, Knežević	UEFA.com

=== Croatia U17 ===
Date	Venue	Opponents	Score	Croatia scorer(s)	Report
2015 FIFA U-17 World Cup - Group stage
17 October 2015	Estadio Nacional Julio Martínez Prádanos, Santiago	Chile	1–1	Moro	FIFA.com
20 October 2015	Estadio Sausalito, Viña del Mar	United States	2–2	Majić, Ivanušec	FIFA.com
23 October 2015	Estadio Municipal Francisco Sánchez Rumoroso, Coquimbo	Nigeria	2–1	Brekalo, Majić	FIFA.com
2015 FIFA U-17 World Cup - Knockout stage
29 October 2015	Estadio Municipal de Concepción, Concepción	Germany	2–0	Moro, Lovren	FIFA.com
1 November 2015	Estadio Municipal Nelson Oyarzún Arenas, Chillán	Mali	0–1		FIFA.com
2016 UEFA European Under-17 Championship qualification - Qualifying round
26 October 2015	Sportpark Eschen-Mauren, Eschen	Gibraltar	4–1	Javorčić (2), Knežević (2)	UEFA.com
28 October 2015	Sportplatz Rheinau, Balzers	Liechtenstein	2–0	Vujčić, Čuže	UEFA.com
31 October 2015	Sportplatz Rheinau, Balzers	Czech Republic	2–2	Špikić, Kulenović	UEFA.com
2016 UEFA European Under-17 Championship qualification - Elite round
16 March 2016	Stadion Valbruna, Rovinj	Wales	0–2		UEFA.com
18 March 2016	Stadion Valbruna, Rovinj	Sweden	1–2	Javorčić	UEFA.com
21 March 2016	Stadion Aldo Drosina, Pula	Portugal	2–4	Špikić, Javorčić	UEFA.com

=== Croatia Women's ===
Date	Venue	Opponents	Score	Croatia scorer(s)	Report
UEFA Women's Euro 2017 qualifying - Group stage
17 September 2015	Kazım Karabekir Stadium, Erzurum	Turkey	4–1	Landeka, Joščak, Šundov, Šalek	UEFA.com
22 September 2015	Stadion Kranjčevićeva, Zagreb	Germany	0–1		UEFA.com
25 October 2015	Stadion Gradski vrt, Osijek	Hungary	1–1	Joščak	UEFA.com
30 November 2015	Stadion Rujevica, Rijeka	Turkey	3–0	Šundov, Joščak, Andrlić	UEFA.com
8 April 2016	Gyirmóti Stadion, Győr	Hungary	0–2		UEFA.com
12 April 2016	Stadion an der Bremer Brücke, Osnabrück	Germany	0–2		UEFA.com
6 June 2016	Gradski stadion, Koprivnica	Russia	0–3		UEFA.com

== League tables ==
=== Croatian First Football League ===
Pos	Team	Pld	W	D	L	GF	GA	GD	Pts	Qualification or relegation
1	Dinamo Zagreb (C)	36	26	7	3	67	19	+48	85	Qualification for the Champions League second qualifying round (Note: Dinamo Zagreb qualified for the Europa League third qualifying round by winning the 2015–16 Croatian Football Cup. However, since they already qualified for European competition based on their league position, the spot awarded to the cup winners was passed down the league.)
2	Rijeka	36	21	14	1	56	20	+36	77	Qualification for the Europa League third qualifying round
3	Hajduk Split	36	17	10	9	46	28	+18	61	Qualification for the Europa League second qualifying round
4	Lokomotiva	36	16	4	16	56	53	+3	52	Qualification for the Europa League first qualifying round
5	Inter Zaprešić	36	11	14	11	39	48	−9	47	
6	RNK Split	36	10	16	10	28	29	−1	46	
7	Slaven Belupo	36	10	12	14	41	42	−1	42	
8	Osijek	36	7	13	16	27	49	−22	34	
9	Istra 1961 (O)	36	4	12	20	23	58	−35	24	Qualification for the relegation play-off
10	NK Zagreb (R)	36	3	8	25	27	64	−37	17	Relegation to Croatian Second Football League

Source: PrvaHNL.hr, Soccerway
Rules for classification: 1) Points; 2) Head-to-head points; 3) Head-to-head goal difference; 4) Head-to-head goals scored (at home if two teams tied); 5) Goal difference; 6) Goals scored; 7) Play-off
(Note: Criteria 2–4 and 7 is only used if deciding Champion, teams to international competition or teams for relegation and in that case criteria 6 will not be used).
(C) Champions; (O) Play-off winners; (R) Relegated

=== Croatian Second Football League ===
Pos	Team	Pld	W	D	L	GF	GA	GD	Pts	Qualification or relegation
1	Cibalia (C, P)	33	20	10	3	54	20	+34	70	Promotion to the Croatian First Football League
2	Šibenik	33	20	9	4	54	21	+33	69	Qualification to the promotion play-off
3	Sesvete	33	15	7	11	56	40	+16	52	
4	Gorica	33	13	8	12	40	40	0	47	
5	Rudeš	33	11	10	12	47	44	+3	43	
6	Dinamo Zagreb II	33	11	10	12	34	37	−3	43	Reserve teams are ineligible for promotion to the Croatian First Football League
7	Dugopolje	33	11	7	15	38	41	−3	40	
8	Lučko	33	11	7	15	40	47	−7	40	
9	Imotski	33	11	7	15	40	50	−10	40	
10	Hrvatski Dragovoljac	33	11	7	15	29	39	−10	40	Relegation to the Croatian Third Football League
11	Segesta (R)	33	10	8	15	44	54	−10	38	Relegation to the Croatian Third Football League
12	Zadar (R)	33	5	8	20	30	73	−43	23	Relegation to the Croatian Third Football League

Source: Druga-HNL.com
Rules for classification: 1) Points; 2) Head-to-head points; 3) Head-to-head goal difference; 4) Head-to-head away goals scored
(C) Champions; (P) Promoted; (R) Relegated

== Croatian clubs in Europe ==
=== Summary ===
Club	Competition	Starting round	Final round	Matches played
Dinamo Zagreb	Champions League	2nd qualifying round	Group stage	12
Rijeka	Europa League	2nd qualifying round		2
Hajduk Split	Europa League	1st qualifying round	Play-off round	8
Lokomotiva	Europa League	1st qualifying round	2nd qualifying round	4
Osijek	Women's Champions League	Qualifying round		3
Dinamo Zagreb U19	UEFA Youth League	Group stage	Round of 16	7

=== Dinamo Zagreb ===
Date	Venue	Opponents	Score	Dinamo Zagreb scorer(s)	Report
2015–16 Champions League - Second qualifying round
15 July 2015	Stadion Maksimir, Zagreb	(Luxembourg) Fola Esch	1–1	Henríquez	UEFA.com
22 July 2015	Stade Émile Mayrisch, Esch-sur-Alzette	(Luxembourg) Fola Esch	3–0	Pjaca (2), Rog	UEFA.com
2015–16 Champions League - Third qualifying round
28 July 2015	Stadion Maksimir, Zagreb	(Norway) Molde	1–1	Henríquez	UEFA.com
4 August 2015	Aker Stadion, Molde	(Norway) Molde	3–3	Pjaca, Ademi, Rog	UEFA.com
2015–16 Champions League - Play-off round
19 August 2015	Elbasan Arena, Elbasan	(Albania) Skënderbeu Korçë	2–1	Soudani, Pivarić	UEFA.com
25 August 2015	Stadion Maksimir, Zagreb	(Albania) Skënderbeu Korçë	4–1	Soudani (2), Taravel, Hodžić	UEFA.com
2015–16 Champions League - Group stage
16 September 2015	Stadion Maksimir, Zagreb	(England) Arsenal	2–1	Pivarić, Fernandes	UEFA.com
29 September 2015	Allianz Arena, Munich	(Germany) Bayern Munich	0–5		UEFA.com
20 October 2015	Stadion Maksimir, Zagreb	(Greece) Olympiacos	0–1		UEFA.com
4 November 2015	Karaiskakis Stadium, Piraeus	(Greece) Olympiacos	1–2	Hodžić	UEFA.com
24 November 2015	Emirates Stadium, London	(England) Arsenal	0–3		UEFA.com
9 December 2015	Stadion Maksimir, Zagreb	(Germany) Bayern Munich	0–2		UEFA.com

=== Rijeka ===
Date	Venue	Opponents	Score	Rijeka scorer(s)	Report
2015–16 Europa League - Second qualifying round
16 July 2015	Stadion Kantrida, Rijeka	(Scotland) Aberdeen	0–3		UEFA.com
23 July 2015	Pittodrie Stadium, Aberdeen	(Scotland) Aberdeen	2–2	Tomasov, Kvržić	UEFA.com

=== Hajduk Split ===
Date	Venue	Opponents	Score	Hajduk Split scorer(s)	Report
2015–16 Europa League - First qualifying round
2 July 2015	Rakvere linnastaadion, Rakvere	(Estonia) Sillamäe Kalev	1–1	Caktaš	UEFA.com
9 July 2015	Stadion Hrvatski vitezovi, Dugopolje	(Estonia) Sillamäe Kalev	6–2	Balić, Caktaš, Ohandza (2), Vlašić, Maglica	UEFA.com
2015–16 Europa League - Second qualifying round
16 July 2015	Bonifika Stadium, Koper	(Slovenia) Koper	2–3	Milović, Nižić	UEFA.com
23 July 2015	Stadion Poljud, Split	(Slovenia) Koper	4–1	Kiš, Jefferson, Caktaš, Maglica	UEFA.com
2015–16 Europa League - Third qualifying round
30 July 2015	Stadion Poljud, Split	(Norway) Strømsgodset	2–0	Balić, Kiš	UEFA.com
6 August 2015	Marienlyst Stadion, Drammen	(Norway) Strømsgodset	2–0	Caktaš, Ohandza	UEFA.com
2015–16 Europa League - Play-off round
20 August 2014	Stadion u Nisy, Liberec	(Czech Republic) Slovan Liberec	0–1		UEFA.com
27 August 2014	Stadion Poljud, Split	(Czech Republic) Slovan Liberec	0–1		UEFA.com

=== Lokomotiva ===
Date	Venue	Opponents	Score	Lokomotiva scorer(s)	Report
2015–16 Europa League - First qualifying round
2 July 2015	Nantporth, Bangor	(Wales) Airbus UK Broughton	3–1	Šovšić, Marić, Kolar	UEFA.com
9 July 2015	Stadion Kranjčevićeva, Zagreb	(Wales) Airbus UK Broughton	2–2	Fiolić, Šovšić	UEFA.com
2015–16 Europa League - Second qualifying round
16 July 2015	Stadion Kranjčevićeva, Zagreb	(Greece) PAOK	2–1	Kolar, Andrijašević	UEFA.com
23 July 2015	Toumba Stadium, Thessaloniki	(Greece) PAOK	0–6		UEFA.com

=== ŽNK Osijek ===
Date	Venue	Opponents	Score	ŽNK Osijek scorer(s)	Report
2015–16 UEFA Women's Champions League - Qualifying round
11 August 2015	Stadion Gradski vrt, Osijek	(Moldova) Noroc Nimoreni	4–0	Šalek, Lojna (2), Andrlić	UEFA.com
13 August 2015	Stadion Gradski vrt, Osijek	(Portugal) Benfica	0–3		UEFA.com
16 August 2015	Stadion Gradski vrt, Osijek	(Serbia) Spartak Subotica	0–3		UEFA.com

=== Dinamo Zagreb U19 ===
Date	Venue	Opponents	Score	Dinamo Zagreb U19 scorer(s)	Report
2015–16 UEFA Youth League - Group stage
16 September 2015	Stadion Hitrec-Kacian, Zagreb	(England) Arsenal	0–2		UEFA.com
29 September 2015	Grünwalder Stadion, Munich	(Germany) Bayern Munich	2–1	Božić, Brekalo	UEFA.com
20 October 2015	Stadion Hitrec-Kacian, Zagreb	(Greece) Olympiacos	2–2	Čabraja, Olmo	UEFA.com
4 November 2015	Renti Training Centre, Piraeus	(Greece) Olympiacos	3–1	Božić, Gojak (2)	UEFA.com
24 November 2015	Meadow Park, Borehamwood	(England) Arsenal	2–1	Brekalo, Gojak	UEFA.com
9 December 2015	Stadion Hitrec-Kacian, Zagreb	(Germany) Bayern Munich	0–1		UEFA.com
2015–16 UEFA Youth League - Round of 16
23 February 2016	Constant Vanden Stock Stadium, Anderlecht	(Belgium) Anderlecht	0–3 (Awarded)	Gojak, Brekalo	UEFA.com

Match originally finished 2–0 in favour of Dinamo Zagreb, but was awarded by UEFA as 3–0 win for Anderlecht due to Dinamo Zagreb fielding suspended player Matija Fintić.
