= 2015–16 UEFA Youth League Domestic Champions Path =

European club football tournament

The 2015–16 UEFA Youth League Domestic Champions Path were played from 29 September to 6 December 2015. A total of 32 teams competed in the Domestic Champions Path to decide 8 of the 24 places in the knockout phase of the 2015–16 UEFA Youth League.

Times up to 24 October 2015 (first round) were CEST (UTC+2), thereafter (second round) times were CET (UTC+1).

== Draw ==
The youth domestic champions of the top 32 associations according to their 2014 UEFA country coefficients entered the Domestic Champions Path. Associations without a youth domestic champion as well as domestic champions already included in the UEFA Champions League path were replaced by the next association in the UEFA ranking.

The 32 teams were drawn into two rounds of two-legged home-and-away ties. The draw was held on 1 September 2015, 13:45 CEST, at the UEFA headquarters in Nyon, Switzerland. There were no seedings, but the 32 teams were split into four groups defined by sporting and geographical criteria prior to the draw.

- In the first round, teams in the same group were drawn against each other, with the order of legs decided by draw.
- In the second round, the winners from Group 1 were drawn against the winners from Group 2, and the winners from Group 3 were drawn against the winners from Group 4, with the order of legs decided by draw.

Key to colours
Second round winners advanced to the play-offs

Group 1 Team (Spain) Villarreal (Italy) Torino (Switzerland) Servette (Cyprus) APOEL (Serbia) Rad (Hungary) Puskás Akadémia (Slovenia) Domžale (Slovakia) Senica	Group 2 Team (England) Middlesbrough (France) Reims (Belgium) Anderlecht (Scotland) Celtic (Sweden) IF Elfsborg (Norway) Brann (Finland) HJK (Iceland) Stjarnan	Group 3 Team (Germany) Schalke 04 (Netherlands) Ajax (Austria) Red Bull Salzburg (Czech Republic) Příbram (Denmark) Midtjylland (Moldova) Zimbru Chișinău (Georgia (country)) Saburtalo Tbilisi (Bosnia and Herzegovina) Željezničar	Group 4 Team (Russia) Spartak Moscow (Turkey) Beşiktaş (Romania) Viitorul Constanța (Poland) Legia Warsaw (Belarus) Minsk (Bulgaria) Litex Lovech (Azerbaijan) Ravan Baku (Kazakhstan) Aktobe

== Format ==
In the Domestic Champions Path, each tie was played over two legs, with each team playing one leg at home. The team that scored more goals on aggregate over the two legs advanced to the next round. If the aggregate score was level, the away goals rule was applied, i.e., the team that scored more goals away from home over the two legs advanced. If away goals were also equal, the match was decided by a penalty shoot-out (no extra time was played).

The eight second round winners advanced to the play-offs, where they were joined by the eight group runners-up from the UEFA Champions League Path.

== First round ==
=== Summary ===
The first legs were played on 29 and 30 September, and the second legs were played on 7, 14, 20 and 21 October 2015.

Team 1	Agg.	Team 2	1st leg	2nd leg
Villarreal (Spain)	4–4 (a)	(Switzerland) Servette	2–3	2–1
APOEL (Cyprus)	4–9	(Hungary) Puskás Akadémia	3–3	1–6
Senica (Slovakia)	1–2	(Italy) Torino	0–0	1–2
Rad (Serbia)	1–1 (3–2 p)	(Slovenia) Domžale	0–1	1–0
Reims (France)	5–6	(England) Middlesbrough	5–3	0–3
IF Elfsborg (Sweden)	2–1	(Iceland) Stjarnan	2–0	0–1
Brann (Norway)	1–6	(Belgium) Anderlecht	1–1	0–5
HJK (Finland)	1–6	(Scotland) Celtic	0–5	1–1
Schalke 04 (Germany)	2–5	(Netherlands) Ajax	2–3	0–2
Příbram (Czech Republic)	4–1	(Moldova) Zimbru Chișinău	2–0	2–1
Red Bull Salzburg (Austria)	5–2	(Bosnia and Herzegovina) Željezničar	4–0	1–2
Midtjylland (Denmark)	5–2 (Note: Order of legs reversed after original draw.)	(Georgia (country)) Saburtalo Tbilisi	3–1	2–1
Aktobe (Kazakhstan)	0–6	(Turkey) Beşiktaş	0–2	0–4
Spartak Moscow (Russia)	4–0	(Azerbaijan) Ravan Baku	4–0	0–0
Minsk (Belarus)	3–7	(Romania) Viitorul Constanța	2–2	1–5
Litex Lovech (Bulgaria)	2–5	(Poland) Legia Warsaw	1–2	1–3

=== Matches ===
30 September 2015
13:00

Villarreal (Spain)	2–3	(Switzerland) Servette
Moreno 48'; Vega 90+2'	Report	Guillemenot 44', 51'; Caslei 49'

Mini Estadi – Ciudad Deportiva, Villarreal
Attendance: 460
Referee: Fabio Verssimo (Portugal)
21 October 2015
14:00

Servette (Switzerland)	1–2	(Spain) Villarreal
Correia 90'	Report	Poveda 56'; Guerra 85'

Stade de Genève, Geneva
Attendance: 1,000
Referee: Stanislav Todorov (Bulgaria)

4–4 on aggregate; Servette won on away goals.

30 September 2015
15:00

APOEL (Cyprus)	3–3	(Hungary) Puskás Akadémia
Christodoulou 27'; C. Charalambous 52'; D. Charalambous 58' (pen.)	Report	Óvári 6', 45'; Szabó 70'

Makario Stadium, Nicosia
Attendance: 350
Referee: Tsvetan Krastev (Bulgaria)
21 October 2015
18:00

Puskás Akadémia (Hungary)	6–1	(Cyprus) APOEL
Damásdi 20', 89'; Péter 37', 73'; Szabó 53' (pen.); Óvári 78' (pen.)	Report	Christodoulou 15'

Pancho Arena, Felcsút
Attendance: 950
Referee: Mikhail Vilkov (Russia)

Puskás Akadémia won 9–4 on aggregate.

29 September 2015
18:00

Senica (Slovakia)	0–0	(Italy) Torino
	Report

OMS Arena, Senica
Attendance: 1,589
Referee: Srđan Jovanović (Serbia)
21 October 2015
18:30

Torino (Italy)	2–1	(Slovakia) Senica
Edera 40', 90+2'	Report	Kosorín 38'

Stadio Olimpico, Turin
Attendance: 6,820
Referee: Tihomir Pejin (Croatia)

Torino won 2–1 on aggregate.

30 September 2015
14:00

Rad (Serbia)	0–1	(Slovenia) Domžale
	Report	Petrić 38'

Stadion Kralj Petar I, Belgrade
Attendance: 1,200
Referee: Georgi Kabakov (Bulgaria)
20 October 2015
16:00

Domžale (Slovenia)	0–1	(Serbia) Rad
	Report	Lutovac 52'
Penalties
Žužek (penalty missed); Repas (penalty scored); Bizilj (penalty scored); Sredojevič (penalty missed); Kene (penalty missed)	2–3	(penalty scored) Bainović; (penalty missed) Mi. Stojanović; (penalty scored) Lutovac; (penalty missed) L. Petrović; (penalty scored) Pavić

Domžale Sports Park, Domžale
Attendance: 1,500
Referee: Andreas Pappas (Greece)

1–1 on aggregate; Rad won 3–2 on penalties.

30 September 2015
19:00

Reims (France)	5–3	(England) Middlesbrough
Oudin 3' (pen.), 58'; Jung 13'; Marques 60'; Sylla 62'	Report	Curry 58'; Cooke 69', 76' (pen.)

Stade Auguste Delaune, Reims
Attendance: 3,749
Referee: Bart Vertenten (Belgium)
21 October 2015
20:00

Middlesbrough (England)	3–0	(France) Reims
Cooke 75'; Mondal 79'; Chapman 90+5' (pen.)	Report

Riverside Stadium, Middlesbrough
Attendance: 1,973
Referee: Neil Doyle (Republic of Ireland)

Middlesbrough won 6–5 on aggregate.

30 September 2015
18:00

IF Elfsborg (Sweden)	2–0	(Iceland) Stjarnan
Kabashi 14', 62' (pen.)	Report

Borås Arena, Borås
Attendance: 1,252
Referee: Andris Treimanis (Latvia)
21 October 2015
20:00

Stjarnan (Iceland)	1–0	(Sweden) IF Elfsborg
Rosberg 2' (o.g.)	Report

Stjörnuvöllur, Garðabær
Attendance: 512
Referee: Jari Järvinen (Finland)

IF Elfsborg won 2–1 on aggregate.

30 September 2015
19:00

Brann (Norway)	1–1	(Belgium) Anderlecht
Brazy 90+2'	Report	Petit 51'

Brann Stadion, Bergen
Attendance: 593
Referee: Anders Poulsen (Denmark)
7 October 2015
19:30

Anderlecht (Belgium)	5–0	(Norway) Brann
Lukebakio 31'; Vancamp 40', 82'; Azevedo-Janelas 59'; Bourard 90+2'	Report

Constant Vanden Stock Stadium, Brussels
Attendance: 2,712
Referee: Benoît Millot (France)

Anderlecht won 6–1 on aggregate.

30 September 2015
17:30

HJK (Finland)	0–5	(Scotland) Celtic
	Report	Hendry 32'; Nesbitt 35', 53', 66'; Miller 37'

Sonera Stadium, Helsinki
Attendance: 832
Referee: Vitali Meshkov (Russia)
20 October 2015
20:00

Celtic (Scotland)	1–1	(Finland) HJK
Nesbitt 61'	Report	Ulmanen 86'

Almondvale Stadium, Livingston
Attendance: 438
Referee: Mervyn Smyth (Northern Ireland)

Celtic won 6–1 on aggregate.

30 September 2015
16:00

Schalke 04 (Germany)	2–3	(Netherlands) Ajax
Reese 45+1'; Bakboord 65' (o.g.)	Report	Nouri 7'; De Ligt 34'; Černý 54'

Stimbergstadion, Oer-Erkenschwick
Attendance: 720
Referee: Stephan Klossner (Switzerland)
21 October 2015
19:00

Ajax (Netherlands)	2–0	(Germany) Schalke 04
Dolberg 40', 62'	Report

Sportpark De Toekomst, Ouder-Amstel
Attendance: 1,650
Referee: Daniel Stefański (Poland)

Ajax won 5–2 on aggregate.

30 September 2015
17:00

Příbram (Czech Republic)	2–0	(Moldova) Zimbru Chișinău
Chaluš 11'; Januška 81'	Report

Na Litavce, Příbram
Attendance: 588
Referee: Domagoj Vučkov (Croatia)
21 October 2015
16:00

Zimbru Chișinău (Moldova)	1–2	(Czech Republic) Příbram
Damașcan 48' (pen.)	Report	Januška 27' (pen.), 82'

Zimbru Stadium, Chișinău
Attendance: 504
Referee: Roi Reinshreiber (Israel)

Příbram won 4–1 on aggregate.

30 September 2015
18:00

Red Bull Salzburg (Austria)	4–0	(Bosnia and Herzegovina) Željezničar
Oberlin 19'; Raischl 26'; Hödl 67'; Grabovac 75'	Report

Untersberg-Arena, Grödig
Attendance: 882
Referee: Zbynek Proske (Czech Republic)
14 October 2015
20:00

Željezničar (Bosnia and Herzegovina)	2–1	(Austria) Red Bull Salzburg
Mujagić 7'; Hajdarević 27'	Report	Hödl 82'

Stadion Grbavica, Sarajevo
Attendance: 967
Referee: Bartosz Frankowski (Poland)

Red Bull Salzburg won 5–2 on aggregate.

30 September 2015
18:00

Midtjylland (Denmark)	3–1	(Georgia (country)) Saburtalo Tbilisi
Sterring 23'; Gemmer 41'; Nissen 84'	Report	Gemmer 50' (o.g.)

MCH Arena, Herning
Attendance: 1,048
Referee: Vilhjalmur Thorarinsson (Iceland)
21 October 2015
17:00

Saburtalo Tbilisi (Georgia (country))	1–2	(Denmark) Midtjylland
Kharaishvili 62'	Report	Nissen 39'; Anderson 53'

Mikheil Meskhi Stadium, Tbilisi
Attendance: 4,800
Referee: Rahim Hasanov (Azerbaijan)

Midtjylland won 5–2 on aggregate.

30 September 2015
15:00

Aktobe (Kazakhstan)	0–2	(Turkey) Beşiktaş
	Report	Aksoy 43'; Taşkaya 73'

Central Stadium, Aktobe
Attendance: 3,000
Referee: Lasha Silagava (Georgia)
21 October 2015
13:00

Beşiktaş (Turkey)	4–0	(Kazakhstan) Aktobe
Durmuş 36'; Taşkaya 62'; Küçükköylü 63'; Başaran 85'	Report

Maltepe Hasan Polat Stadyumu, Istanbul
Attendance: 55
Referee: Alan Mario Sant (Malta)

Beşiktaş won 6–0 on aggregate.

30 September 2015
14:00

Spartak Moscow (Russia)	4–0	(Azerbaijan) Ravan Baku
Panteleyev 53', 79'; Melkadze 61'; Bakaev 81'	Report

Spartak Academy pitch no. 4, Moscow
Attendance: 161
Referee: Eiko Saar (Estonia)
21 October 2015
16:00

Ravan Baku (Azerbaijan)	0–0	(Russia) Spartak Moscow
	Report

Dalga Arena, Baku
Attendance: 100
Referee: Giorgi Kruashvili (Georgia)

Spartak Moscow won 4–0 on aggregate.

29 September 2015
17:00

Minsk (Belarus)	2–2	(Romania) Viitorul Constanța
Bessmertny 6'; Bakhar 18'	Report	Marin 25' (pen.); Ciobanu 67'

FC Minsk Stadium, Minsk
Attendance: 700
Referee: Kristo Tohver (Estonia)
21 October 2015
17:00

Viitorul Constanța (Romania)	5–1	(Belarus) Minsk
Marin 54' (pen.), 86'; Grecu 61'; Coman 62'; Ene 69'	Report	Gromyko 29'

Central Stadium Hagi Academy, Ovidiu
Attendance: 924
Referee: Vasilis Dimitriou (Cyprus)

Viitorul Constanța won 7–3 on aggregate.

30 September 2015
18:00

Litex Lovech (Bulgaria)	1–2	(Poland) Legia Warsaw
Yordanov 52'	Report	Ryczkowski 9'; Karbowy 84' (pen.)

Lovech Stadium, Lovech
Attendance: 250
Referee: István Kovács (Romania)
20 October 2015
18:00

Legia Warsaw (Poland)	3–1	(Bulgaria) Litex Lovech
Karbowy 45+2' (pen.); Najemski 53'; Bartczak 57'	Report	Despodov 63' (pen.)

Stadion Miejski, Nowy Dwór Mazowiecki
Attendance: 620
Referee: Vladimir Vnuk (Slovakia)

Legia Warsaw won 5–2 on aggregate.

== Second round ==
=== Summary ===
The first legs were played on 4, 5 November and 2 December, and the second legs were played on 24, 25 November and 6 December 2015.

Team 1	Agg.	Team 2	1st leg	2nd leg
Puskás Akadémia (Hungary)	1–3	(Scotland) Celtic	1–0	0–3
Rad (Serbia)	0–1	(Sweden) IF Elfsborg	0–1	0–0
Servette (Switzerland)	3–4 (Note: Order of legs reversed after original draw.)	(Belgium) Anderlecht	1–2	2–2
Middlesbrough (England)	6–3	(Italy) Torino	3–0	3–3
Spartak Moscow (Russia)	1–5	(Netherlands) Ajax	0–3	1–2
Beşiktaş (Turkey)	2–5	(Austria) Red Bull Salzburg	1–0	1–5
Midtjylland (Denmark)	5–1	(Poland) Legia Warsaw	2–0	3–1
Příbram (Czech Republic)	2–0	(Romania) Viitorul Constanța	2–0	0–0

=== Matches ===
4 November 2015
18:00

Puskás Akadémia (Hungary)	1–0	(Scotland) Celtic
Damásdi 90'	Report

Pancho Arena, Felcsút
Attendance: 1,230
Referee: Vadims Direktorenko (Latvia)
25 November 2015
20:00

Celtic (Scotland)	3–0	(Hungary) Puskás Akadémia
Archibald 29'; Miller 38', 84'	Report

Almondvale Stadium, Livingston
Attendance: 250
Referee: Bart Vertenten (Belgium)

Celtic won 3–1 on aggregate.

4 November 2015
14:00

Rad (Serbia)	0–1	(Sweden) IF Elfsborg
	Report	Iglicar Berntsson 62'

Stadion Kralj Petar I, Belgrade
Attendance: 2,057
Referee: Yuriy Mozharovskyy (Ukraine)
25 November 2015
18:00

IF Elfsborg (Sweden)	0–0	(Serbia) Rad
	Report

Borås Arena, Borås
Attendance: 463
Referee: Jens Maae (Denmark)

IF Elfsborg won 1–0 on aggregate.

2 December 2015 (Note: Anderlecht's home match against Servette was originally scheduled for 24 November 2015, 19:30, at the Constant Vanden Stock Stadium, Brussels, but was postponed due to the security threats around Brussels in the aftermath of the November 2015 Paris attacks. It was rescheduled for 6 December 2015, 14:00, at the Van Roy Stadium, Denderleeuw, after Servette's home match was played on 2 December 2015, thus reversing the order of the legs.)
14:00

Servette (Switzerland)	1–2	(Belgium) Anderlecht
Caslei 53'	Report	De Medina 49'; Lukebakio 56'

Stade de Genève, Geneva
Attendance: 850
Referee: Tomasz Musiał (Poland)
6 December 2015
14:00

Anderlecht (Belgium)	2–2	(Switzerland) Servette
Bourard 44'; Vancamp 58'	Report	Guillemenot 31', 34'

Van Roy Stadium, Denderleeuw
Attendance: 250
Referee: Zbynek Proske (Czech Republic)

Anderlecht won 4–3 on aggregate.

5 November 2015
20:00

Middlesbrough (England)	3–0	(Italy) Torino
Mondal 77'; Coulson 84'; Chapman 87'	Report

Riverside Stadium, Middlesbrough
Attendance: 2,238
Referee: Thorvaldur Árnason (Iceland)
24 November 2015
20:00

Torino (Italy)	3–3	(England) Middlesbrough
Candellone 60'; Edera 63'; Mantovani 68'	Report	Chapman 67'; Pattison 87'; Mondal 90+3'

Stadio Olimpico, Turin
Attendance: 3,744
Referee: Manuel Schuettengruber (Austria)

Middlesbrough won 6–3 on aggregate.

4 November 2015
11:00

Spartak Moscow (Russia)	0–3	(Netherlands) Ajax
	Report	El Azzouzi 44' (pen.); Dolberg 49'; Walian 70'

Spartak Academy pitch no. 4, Moscow
Attendance: 503
Referee: Ville Nevalainen (Finland)
25 November 2015
18:30

Ajax (Netherlands)	2–1	(Russia) Spartak Moscow
Nouri 26'; Sierhuis 53'	Report	Lomovitskiy 67'

Sportpark De Toekomst, Ouder-Amstel
Attendance: 558
Referee: Johnny Casanova (San Marino)

Ajax won 5–1 on aggregate.

4 November 2015
12:00

Beşiktaş (Turkey)	1–0	(Austria) Red Bull Salzburg
Başaran 69'	Report

Maltepe Hasan Polat Stadyumu, Istanbul
Attendance: 60
Referee: Dejan Jakimovski (Macedonia)
24 November 2015
18:00

Red Bull Salzburg (Austria)	5–1	(Turkey) Beşiktaş
Oberlin 13', 74', 77'; Upamecano 59'; Schlager 66'	Report	Afkan 36'

Untersberg-Arena, Grödig
Attendance: 825
Referee: Sandor Szabo (Hungary)

Red Bull Salzburg won 5–2 on aggregate.

4 November 2015
18:00

Midtjylland (Denmark)	2–0	(Poland) Legia Warsaw
Olsen 63'; Rutikanga 90+3' (pen.)	Report

MCH Arena, Herning
Attendance: 750
Referee: Dominik Ouschan (Austria)
24 November 2015
16:00

Legia Warsaw (Poland)	1–3	(Denmark) Midtjylland
Nawotka 73' (pen.)	Report	Rutikanga 12', 62' (pen.); Thychosen 66'

Stadion Miejski, Nowy Dwór Mazowiecki
Attendance: 150
Referee: Yaroslav Kozyk (Ukraine)

Midtjylland won 5–1 on aggregate.

4 November 2015
17:00

Příbram (Czech Republic)	2–0	(Romania) Viitorul Constanța
Šrain 33'; Hlavatý 72'	Report

Na Litavce, Příbram
Attendance: 787
Referee: Irfan Peljto (Bosnia and Herzegovina)
25 November 2015
17:00

Viitorul Constanța (Romania)	0–0	(Czech Republic) Příbram
	Report

Central Stadium Hagi Academy, Ovidiu
Attendance: 200
Referee: Fran Jović (Croatia)

Příbram won 2–0 on aggregate.
