= 2015–16 UEFA Youth League knockout phase =

European club football tournament

The 2015–16 UEFA Youth League knockout phase began on 9 February 2016 and concluded on 18 April 2016 with the final at Colovray Stadium in Nyon, Switzerland, which decided the champions of the 2015–16 UEFA Youth League. A total of 24 teams competed in the knockout phase.

Times up to 26 March 2016 (knockout round play-offs, round of 16 and quarter-finals) were CET (UTC+1), thereafter times (semi-finals and final) were CEST (UTC+2).

== Round and draw dates ==
The schedule of the competition was as follows (all draws were held at the UEFA headquarters in Nyon, Switzerland).

Round	Draw	Match dates
Knockout round play-offs	14 December 2015, 14:00	9–10 February 2016
Round of 16	15 February 2016, 13:00	23–24 February 2016
Quarter-finals	15 February 2016, 13:00	8–9 March 2016
Semi-finals	15 February 2016, 13:00	15 April 2016 at Colovray Stadium, Nyon
Final	15 February 2016, 13:00	18 April 2016 at Colovray Stadium, Nyon

== Format ==
The knockout phase involved 24 teams: 16 teams which qualified from the UEFA Champions League Path (eight group winners and eight group runners-up), and eight teams which qualified from the Domestic Champions Path (eight second round winners):

- The eight group winners from the UEFA Champions League Path entered the round of 16.
- The eight group runners-up from the UEFA Champions League Path and the eight second round winners from the Domestic Champions Path entered the knockout round play-offs. The eight play-off winners advanced to the round of 16.

Each tie in the knockout phase was played over one match. If the scores were level after full-time, the match was decided by a penalty shoot-out (no extra time was played).

The mechanism of the draws for each round was as follows:

- In the draw for the knockout round play-offs, the eight second round winners from the Domestic Champions Path were drawn against the eight group runners-up from the UEFA Champions League Path, with the teams from the Domestic Champions Path hosting the match. Teams from the same association could not be drawn against each other.
- In the draw for the round of 16, the eight group winners from the UEFA Champions League Path were drawn against the eight play-off winners. Teams from the same UEFA Champions League Path group could not be drawn against each other, but teams from the same association could be drawn against each other. The draw also decided the home team for each round of 16 match.
- In the draws for the quarter-finals onwards, there were no seedings, and teams from the same UEFA Champions League Path group or the same association could be drawn against each other. The draws also decided the home team for each quarter-final, and the "home" team for administrative purposes for each semi-final and final (which were played at a neutral venue).

== Qualified teams ==
=== UEFA Champions League Path ===
Group	Winners (enter round of 16)	Runners-up (enter play-offs as away team)
A	(France) Paris Saint-Germain	(Spain) Real Madrid
B	(Netherlands) PSV Eindhoven	(Russia) CSKA Moscow
C	(Portugal) Benfica	(Spain) Atlético Madrid
D	(England) Manchester City	(Spain) Sevilla
E	(Spain) Barcelona	(Italy) Roma
F	(Croatia) Dinamo Zagreb	(England) Arsenal
G	(England) Chelsea	(Ukraine) Dynamo Kyiv
H	(France) Lyon	(Spain) Valencia

=== Domestic Champions Path ===
Second round winners
(enter play-offs as home team)
(Scotland) Celtic
(Sweden) IF Elfsborg
(Belgium) Anderlecht
(England) Middlesbrough
(Netherlands) Ajax
(Austria) Red Bull Salzburg
(Denmark) Midtjylland
(Czech Republic) Příbram

== Bracket ==
The draw for the round of 16 onwards was held on 15 February 2016.

Knockout round play-offs
(Sweden) IF Elfsborg	1
(Spain) Real Madrid	3
(Czech Republic) Příbram (p)	1 (5)
(Russia) CSKA Moscow	1 (4)
(England) Middlesbrough	5
(Ukraine) Dynamo Kyiv	0
(Austria) Red Bull Salzburg	0
(Italy) Roma	4
(Scotland) Celtic	1 (3)
(Spain) Valencia (p)	1 (4)
(Netherlands) Ajax	3
(Spain) Sevilla	1
(Belgium) Anderlecht	2
(England) Arsenal	0
(Denmark) Midtjylland (p)	4 (5)
(Spain) Atlético Madrid	4 (4)

Round of 16
(Spain) Real Madrid	3
(England) Manchester City	1
(Czech Republic) Příbram	1 (3)
(Portugal) Benfica (p)	1 (5)
(France) Paris Saint-Germain	1
(England) Middlesbrough	0
(Netherlands) PSV Eindhoven	2 (1)
(Italy) Roma (p)	2 (3)
(England) Chelsea (p)	1 (5)
(Spain) Valencia	1 (3)
(France) Lyon	0
(Netherlands) Ajax	3
(Belgium) Anderlecht	3
(Croatia) Dinamo Zagreb	0
(Spain) Barcelona	3
(Denmark) Midtjylland	1

Quarter-finals
(Spain) Real Madrid	2
(Portugal) Benfica	0
(France) Paris Saint-Germain	3
(Italy) Roma	1
(England) Chelsea	1
(Netherlands) Ajax	0
(Belgium) Anderlecht	2
(Spain) Barcelona	0

Semi-finals
15 April – Nyon
(Spain) Real Madrid	1
(France) Paris Saint-Germain	3
15 April – Nyon
(England) Chelsea	3
(Belgium) Anderlecht	0

Final
18 April – Nyon
(France) Paris Saint-Germain	1
(England) Chelsea	2

== Knockout round play-offs ==
The draw for the knockout round play-offs was held on 14 December 2015.

=== Summary ===
The play-offs were played on 9 and 10 February 2016. The eight play-off winners advanced to the round of 16, where they were joined by the eight group winners from the UEFA Champions League Path.

Home team	Score	Away team
Ajax (Netherlands)	3–1	(Spain) Sevilla
Příbram (Czech Republic)	2–2 (5–4 p)	(Russia) CSKA Moscow
Red Bull Salzburg (Austria)	0–4	(Italy) Roma
Anderlecht (Belgium)	2–0	(England) Arsenal
Celtic (Scotland)	1–1 (3–4 p)	(Spain) Valencia
IF Elfsborg (Sweden)	1–3	(Spain) Real Madrid
Middlesbrough (England)	5–0	(Ukraine) Dynamo Kyiv
Midtjylland (Denmark)	4–4 (5–4 p)	(Spain) Atlético Madrid

=== Matches ===
9 February 2016
16:00

Ajax (Netherlands)	3–1	(Spain) Sevilla
Dekker 14'; Van de Beek 49'; Nouri 79'	Report	Nané 36'

Sportpark De Toekomst, Ouder-Amstel
Attendance: 1,208
Referee: Daniel Siebert (Germany)

10 February 2016
17:00

Příbram (Czech Republic)	2–2	(Russia) CSKA Moscow
Chaluš 13'; Januška 71' (pen.)	Report	Kuchaev 46'; Gordyushenko 56'
Penalties
Květ (penalty scored); Hlavatý (penalty scored); Chaluš (penalty scored); Šrain (penalty scored); Januška (penalty scored)	5–4	(penalty scored) Zhamaletdinov; (penalty scored) Pukhov; (penalty scored) Gordyushenko; (penalty scored) Khosonov; (penalty missed) Yusupov

Na Litavce, Příbram
Attendance: 5,237
Referee: Ivaylo Stoyanov (Bulgaria)

10 February 2016
16:00

Red Bull Salzburg (Austria)	0–4	(Italy) Roma
	Report	Marchizza 8' (pen.); Sadiq 17'; Soleri 39'; Di Livio 72'

Red Bull Arena, Wals-Siezenheim
Attendance: 1,080
Referee: Radu Petrescu (Romania)

9 February 2016
18:00

Anderlecht (Belgium)	2–0	(England) Arsenal
Vancamp 8', 28'	Report

Constant Vanden Stock Stadium, Brussels
Attendance: 5,624
Referee: Davide Massa (Italy)

10 February 2016
18:00

Celtic (Scotland)	1–1	(Spain) Valencia
Aitchison 40'	Report	I. Martínez 87'
Penalties
Hendry (penalty scored); Murray (penalty scored); Archibald (penalty missed); Lafferty (penalty scored); McIlduff (penalty missed); Kelleher (penalty missed); McCart (penalty missed)	3–4	(penalty missed) Soler; (penalty scored) Llamas; (penalty scored) Mir; (penalty missed) T. Martínez; (penalty scored) I. Martínez; (penalty missed) Gómez; (penalty scored) Lato

Celtic Park, Glasgow
Attendance: 934
Referee: Craig Pawson (England)

10 February 2016
18:00

IF Elfsborg (Sweden)	1–3	(Spain) Real Madrid
Kabashi 63'	Report	Mayoral 48', 84'; Febas 72'

Borås Arena, Borås
Attendance: 6,668
Referee: Kristo Tohver (Estonia)

9 February 2016
20:00

Middlesbrough (England)	5–0	(Ukraine) Dynamo Kyiv
Cooke 8'; Pattison 31'; Jakupovic 49'; Coulson 68'; Wheatley 78'	Report

Riverside Stadium, Middlesbrough
Attendance: 2,343
Referee: Svein-Erik Edvartsen (Norway)

10 February 2016
17:00

Midtjylland (Denmark)	4–4	(Spain) Atlético Madrid
Thychosen 32'; Anderson 43'; Thomsen 56'; Damkjær 67'	Report	Moreno 37'; Hernandez 41'; Mohedano 51'; Ferni 90+1'
Penalties
Jürgensen (penalty scored); Thychosen (penalty scored); Olsen (penalty scored); Anderson (penalty scored); Hagelskjær (penalty scored)	5–4	(penalty scored) Ferni; (penalty missed) Moya; (penalty scored) Moreno; (penalty scored) Boulahia; (penalty scored) Montoro

MCH Arena, Herning
Attendance: 2,250
Referee: Jonathan Lardot (Belgium)

== Round of 16 ==
=== Summary ===
The round of 16 matches were played on 23 and 24 February 2016.

Home team	Score	Away team
PSV Eindhoven (Netherlands)	2–2 (1–3 p)	(Italy) Roma
Příbram (Czech Republic)	1–1 (3–5 p)	(Portugal) Benfica
Anderlecht (Belgium)	3–0 (Note: Match originally finished 0–2 in favour of Dinamo Zagreb, but was awarded by UEFA as 3–0 win for Anderlecht due to Dinamo Zagreb fielding suspended player Matija Fintić.)	(Croatia) Dinamo Zagreb
Lyon (France)	0–3	(Netherlands) Ajax
Chelsea (England)	1–1 (5–3 p)	(Spain) Valencia
Real Madrid (Spain)	3–1	(England) Manchester City
Paris Saint-Germain (France)	1–0	(England) Middlesbrough
Barcelona (Spain)	3–1	(Denmark) Midtjylland

=== Matches ===
24 February 2016
14:00

PSV Eindhoven (Netherlands)	2–2	(Italy) Roma
Bergwijn 14'; Verreth 73'	Report	Marchizza 49' (pen.); Soleri 68'
Penalties
Bergwijn (penalty missed); Rigo (penalty missed); Lammers (penalty missed); Abels (penalty scored)	1–3	(penalty scored) Vasco; (penalty scored) Sadiq; (penalty missed) Bordin; (penalty scored) Grossi

De Herdgang, Eindhoven
Attendance: 1,102
Referee: Michael Tykgaard (Denmark)

24 February 2016
17:00

Příbram (Czech Republic)	1–1	(Portugal) Benfica
Ayong 85'	Report	Sarkic 34'
Penalties
Holý (penalty missed); Hlavatý (penalty scored); Chaluš (penalty scored); Květ (penalty scored)	3–5	(penalty scored) Sarkic; (penalty scored) Gonçalves; (penalty scored) Ferro; (penalty scored) J. Pereira; (penalty scored) Rodrigues

Na Litavce, Příbram
Attendance: 6,732
Referee: Sergei Ivanov (Russia)

23 February 2016
19:00

Anderlecht (Belgium)	3–0 Awarded (Note: Match originally finished 0–2 in favour of Dinamo Zagreb, but was awarded by UEFA as 3–0 win for Anderlecht due to Dinamo Zagreb fielding suspended player Matija Fintić.)	(Croatia) Dinamo Zagreb
	Report	Gojak 47'; Brekalo 57'

Constant Vanden Stock Stadium, Brussels
Attendance: 3,209
Referee: Andris Treimanis (Latvia)

24 February 2016
17:00

Lyon (France)	0–3	(Netherlands) Ajax
	Report	Van de Beek 18'; Nouri 25'; Bergsma 51'

Plaine des Jeux de Gerland, Lyon
Attendance: 2,150
Referee: Kevin Clancy (Scotland)

23 February 2016
16:00

Chelsea (England)	1–1	(Spain) Valencia
Dasilva 44'	Report	Soler 45+1' (pen.)
Penalties
Colkett (penalty scored); Mount (penalty scored); Scott (penalty scored); Palmer (penalty scored); Abraham (penalty scored)	5–3	(penalty scored) Soler; (penalty missed) Gil; (penalty scored) Villar; (penalty scored) Mir

Cobham Training Centre, Stoke d'Abernon
Attendance: 250
Referee: Adrien Jaccottet (Switzerland)

23 February 2016
18:00

Real Madrid (Spain)	3–1	(England) Manchester City
Mayoral 36', 41'; Hakimi 87'	Report	Buckley-Ricketts 63'

Alfredo di Stéfano, Madrid
Attendance: 1,150
Referee: Marco Guida (Italy)

24 February 2016
16:00

Paris Saint-Germain (France)	1–0	(England) Middlesbrough
Augustin 41'	Report

Stade Municipal Georges Lefèvre, Saint-Germain-en-Laye
Attendance: 420
Referee: Alexander Harkam (Austria)

23 February 2016
14:00

Barcelona (Spain)	3–1	(Denmark) Midtjylland
Chendri 51'; Lee Seung-woo 90'; Aleñá 90+2'	Report	Montes 34' (o.g.)

Mini Estadi, Barcelona
Attendance: 643
Referee: Georgi Kabakov (Bulgaria)

== Quarter-finals ==
=== Summary ===
The quarter-finals were played on 8, 9 and 15 March 2016.

Home team	Score	Away team
Chelsea (England)	1–0	(Netherlands) Ajax
Paris Saint-Germain (France)	3–1	(Italy) Roma
Anderlecht (Belgium)	2–0	(Spain) Barcelona
Real Madrid (Spain)	2–0	(Portugal) Benfica

=== Matches ===
15 March 2016
17:00

Chelsea (England)	1–0	(Netherlands) Ajax
Scott 44'	Report

Cobham Training Centre, Stoke d'Abernon
Attendance: 228
Referee: Orel Grinfeld (Israel)

9 March 2016
16:00

Paris Saint-Germain (France)	3–1	(Italy) Roma
Ballo-Touré 26'; Meïté 39'; Nkunku 90'	Report	Tumminello 75'

Stade Municipal Georges Lefèvre, Saint-Germain-en-Laye
Attendance: 452
Referee: Alejandro Hernández Hernández (Spain)

8 March 2016
18:00

Anderlecht (Belgium)	2–0	(Spain) Barcelona
Vancamp 53'; Bernier 88'	Report

Van Roy Stadium, Denderleeuw
Attendance: 4,250
Referee: Aliyar Aghayev (Azerbaijan)

8 March 2016
16:00

Real Madrid (Spain)	2–0	(Portugal) Benfica
Febas 66'; Salto 77'	Report

Alfredo di Stéfano, Madrid
Attendance: 1,012
Referee: Nicolas Rainville (France)

== Semi-finals ==
=== Summary ===
The semi-finals were played on 15 April 2016 at Colovray Stadium, Nyon.

Team 1	Score	Team 2
Real Madrid (Spain)	1–3	(France) Paris Saint-Germain
Chelsea (England)	3–0	(Belgium) Anderlecht

=== Matches ===
15 April 2016
17:00

Real Madrid (Spain)	1–3	(France) Paris Saint-Germain
Mayoral 33' (pen.)	Report	Hakimi 5' (o.g.); Kanga 84'; Augustin 90'

Colovray Stadium, Nyon
Attendance: 4,000
Referee: Davide Massa (Italy)

15 April 2016
13:00

Chelsea (England)	3–0	(Belgium) Anderlecht
Palmer 21'; Colkett 56'; Abraham 75'	Report

Colovray Stadium, Nyon
Attendance: 3,280
Referee: Andreas Ekberg (Sweden)

== Final ==
The final was played on 18 April 2016 at Colovray Stadium, Nyon.

18 April 2016
17:00

Paris Saint-Germain (France)	1–2	(England) Chelsea
Meïté 58'	Report	Tomori 10'; Palmer 61'

Colovray Stadium, Nyon
Attendance: 4,000
Referee: Daniel Siebert (Germany)
