= Roberto Núñez =

Roberto Núñez may refer to:

- Roberto Núñez (gymnast), Argentine gymnast
- Roberto Núñez (footballer), Spanish footballer
