= 2015–16 UEFA Youth League =

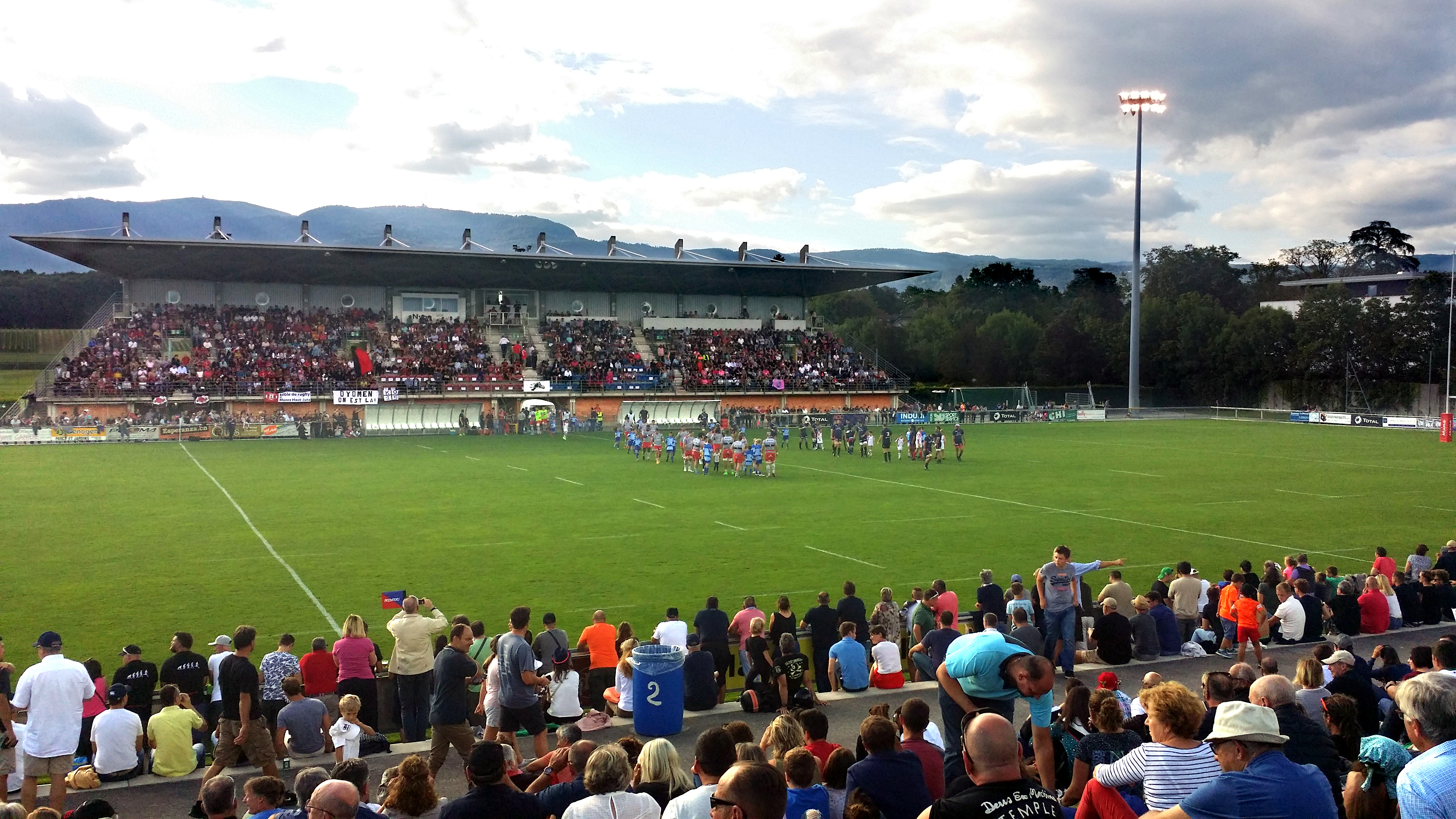
- The Colovray Stadium in Nyon hosted the semi-finals and final.

Tournament details
- Dates: 15 September 2015 – 18 April 2016
- Teams: 64 (from 37 associations)

Final positions
- Champions: (England) Chelsea (2nd title)
- Runners-up: (France) Paris Saint-Germain

Tournament statistics
- Matches played: 167
- Goals scored: 538 (3.22 per match)
- Top scorer(s): (Spain) Roberto Núñez (Atlético Madrid); 9 goals

The 2015–16 UEFA Youth League was the third season of the UEFA Youth League, a European youth club football competition organised by UEFA.

After a two-year trial period, the UEFA Youth League became a permanent UEFA competition starting from this season, with the tournament expanded from 32 to 64 teams.

Chelsea retained their title after defeating Paris Saint-Germain 2–1 in the final.

== Format changes ==
The UEFA Executive Committee held on 18 September 2014 approved the following changes to the UEFA Youth League starting from the 2015–16 season:

- The tournament is expanded from 32 to 64 teams. The 64 teams include the youth teams of the 32 clubs which participate in the UEFA Champions League group stage, which have been included since the first edition, as well as the youth domestic champions of the top 32 associations according to their UEFA country coefficients, which are included starting from this edition. Associations without a youth domestic champion as well as domestic champions already included in the UEFA Champions League path are replaced by the next association in the UEFA ranking.
- The new format of the competition sees the two groups of teams compete in separate paths until the play-offs:
  - In the UEFA Champions League path, the 32 Champions League youth teams retain the group stage format and schedule which correspond to the Champions League group stage. The group winners advance to the round of 16, and the group runners-up advance to the play-offs.
  - In the Domestic Champions path, the 32 youth domestic champions play two rounds of two-legged ties, with the eight winners advancing to the play-offs.
  - In the play-offs, the youth domestic champions play a single match at home against the UEFA Champions League path group runners-up.
  - In the round of 16, the UEFA Champions League path group winners play a single match against the winners of the play-offs (home team determined by draw).
  - In the quarter-finals, semi-finals, and final, teams play each other over a single match (quarter-finals home team determined by draw, semi-finals and final played at neutral venues).
- The under-19 age limit is retained, but clubs are able to include a maximum of three under-20 players in their overall list of 40 players for the competition, in order to alleviate the burden on players having school duties.

== Teams ==
A total of 64 teams from 37 of the 54 UEFA member associations entered the tournament. They were split into two sections:

- The youth teams of the 32 clubs which qualified for the 2015–16 UEFA Champions League group stage entered the UEFA Champions League Path.
- The youth domestic champions of the top 32 associations according to their 2014 UEFA country coefficients entered the Domestic Champions Path. Associations without a youth domestic champion as well as domestic champions already included in the UEFA Champions League path were replaced by the next association in the UEFA ranking.

Rank	Association	Teams	
Rank	Association	UEFA Champions League Path	Domestic Champions Path
1	Spain	Barcelona; Real Madrid; Atlético Madrid; Sevilla; Valencia	Villarreal
2	England	Chelsea; Manchester City; Arsenal; Manchester United	Middlesbrough
3	Germany	Bayern Munich; VfL Wolfsburg; Borussia Mönchengladbach; Bayer Leverkusen	Schalke 04
4	Italy	Juventus; Roma	Torino
5	Portugal	Benfica; Porto	
6	France	Paris Saint-Germain; Lyon	Reims
7	Russia	Zenit Saint Petersburg; CSKA Moscow	Spartak Moscow
8	Netherlands	PSV Eindhoven	Ajax
9	Ukraine	Dynamo Kyiv; Shakhtar Donetsk	
10	Belgium	Gent	Anderlecht
11	Turkey	Galatasaray	Beşiktaş
12	Greece	Olympiacos	
13	Switzerland		Servette
14	Austria		FC Salzburg
15	Czech Republic		Příbram
16	Romania		Viitorul Constanța
17	Israel	Maccabi Tel Aviv	
18	Cyprus		APOEL
19	Denmark		Midtjylland
20	Croatia	Dinamo Zagreb	
21	Poland		Legia Warsaw
22	Belarus	BATE Borisov	Minsk
23	Scotland		Celtic
24	Sweden	Malmö FF	IF Elfsborg
25	Bulgaria		Litex Lovech
26	Norway		Brann
27	Serbia		Rad
28	Hungary		Puskás Akadémia
29	Slovenia		Domžale
30	Slovakia		Senica
31	Moldova		Zimbru Chișinău
32	Azerbaijan		Ravan Baku
33	Georgia		Saburtalo Tbilisi
34	Kazakhstan	Astana	Aktobe
35	Bosnia and Herzegovina		Željezničar
36	Finland		HJK
37	Iceland		Stjarnan
Associations which did not enter a team
38	Latvia		
39	Montenegro		
40	Albania		
41	Lithuania		
42	Macedonia		
43	Republic of Ireland		
44	Luxembourg		
45	Malta		
46	Liechtenstein		
47	Northern Ireland		
48	Wales		
49	Armenia		
50	Estonia		
51	Faroe Islands		
52	San Marino		
53	Andorra		
54	Gibraltar		

Notes

1. ^{TH} Title holders
2. ^{†} Teams which were also youth domestic champions.

== Squads ==
Players must be born on or after 1 January 1997, with a maximum of three players per team born between 1 January 1996 and 31 December 1996 allowed.

== Round and draw dates ==
The schedule of the competition was as follows (all draws were held at the UEFA headquarters in Nyon, Switzerland, unless stated otherwise).

Phase	Round	Draw date	First leg	Second leg
UEFA Champions League Path; Group stage	Matchday 1	27 August 2015 (Monaco)	15–16 September 2015	
UEFA Champions League Path; Group stage	Matchday 2	27 August 2015 (Monaco)	29–30 September 2015	
UEFA Champions League Path; Group stage	Matchday 3	27 August 2015 (Monaco)	20–21 October 2015	
UEFA Champions League Path; Group stage	Matchday 4	27 August 2015 (Monaco)	3–4 November 2015	
UEFA Champions League Path; Group stage	Matchday 5	27 August 2015 (Monaco)	24–25 November 2015	
UEFA Champions League Path; Group stage	Matchday 6	27 August 2015 (Monaco)	8–9 December 2015	
Domestic Champions Path	First round	1 September 2015	29–30 September 2015	20–21 October 2015
Domestic Champions Path	Second round	1 September 2015	3–4 November 2015	24–25 November 2015
Knockout phase	Knockout round play-offs	14 December 2015	9–10 February 2016	
Knockout phase	Round of 16	15 February 2016	23–24 February 2016	
Knockout phase	Quarter-finals	15 February 2016	8–9 March 2016	
Knockout phase	Semi-finals	15 February 2016	15 April 2016 at Colovray Stadium, Nyon	
Knockout phase	Final	15 February 2016	18 April 2016 at Colovray Stadium, Nyon	

Notes

- For the UEFA Champions League Path group stage, in principle the teams played their matches on Tuesdays and Wednesdays, the same day as the corresponding senior teams in the UEFA Champions League; however, matches could also be played on other dates, including Mondays and Thursdays.
- For the Domestic Champions Path first and second rounds, in principle matches were played on Wednesdays; however, matches could also be played on other dates, including Mondays, Tuesdays and Thursdays.
- For the play-offs, round of 16 and quarter-finals, in principle matches were played on Tuesdays and Wednesdays; however, matches could also be played on other dates, provided they were completed before the following dates:
  - Play-offs: 12 February 2016
  - Round of 16: 26 February 2016
  - Quarter-finals: 18 March 2016

== UEFA Champions League Path ==
For the UEFA Champions League Path, the 32 teams were drawn into eight groups of four. There was no separate draw held, with the group compositions identical to the draw for the 2015–16 UEFA Champions League group stage, which was held in Monaco on 27 August 2015.

In each group, teams played against each other home-and-away in a round-robin format. The eight group winners advanced to the round of 16, while the eight runners-up advanced to the play-offs, where they were joined by the eight second round winners from the Domestic Champions Path. The matchdays were 15–16 September, 29–30 September, 20–21 October, 3–4 November, 24–25 November, and 8–9 December 2015.

Tiebreakers
The teams were ranked according to points (3 points for a win, 1 point for a draw, 0 points for a loss). If two or more teams were equal on points on completion of the group matches, the following criteria were applied in the order given to determine the rankings (regulations Article 14.03):
1. higher number of points obtained in the group matches played among the teams in question;
2. superior goal difference from the group matches played among the teams in question;
3. higher number of goals scored in the group matches played among the teams in question;
4. higher number of goals scored away from home in the group matches played among the teams in question;
5. if, after having applied criteria 1 to 4, teams still had an equal ranking, criteria 1 to 4 were reapplied exclusively to the matches between the teams in question to determine their final rankings. If this procedure did not lead to a decision, criteria 6 to 12 applied;
6. superior goal difference in all group matches;
7. higher number of goals scored in all group matches;
8. higher number of away goals scored in all group matches;
9. higher number of wins in all group matches;
10. higher number of away wins in all group matches;
11. lower disciplinary points total based only on yellow and red cards received in all group matches (red card = 3 points, yellow card = 1 point, expulsion for two yellow cards in one match = 3 points);
12. drawing of lots.

=== Group A ===
Pos	Team	Pld	W	D	L	GF	GA	GD	Pts	Qualification	PAR	RMA	MAL	SHK
1	(France) Paris Saint-Germain	6	4	1	1	16	6	+10	13	Advance to round of 16	—	4–1	0–0	5–2
2	(Spain) Real Madrid	6	4	0	2	16	7	+9	12	Advance to play-offs	2–0	—	3–0	4–0
3	(Sweden) Malmö FF	6	1	2	3	7	14	−7	5		0–3	1–0	—	5–5
4	(Ukraine) Shakhtar Donetsk	6	1	1	4	13	25	−12	4		1–4	2–6	3–1	—

Source: UEFA

=== Group B ===
Pos	Team	Pld	W	D	L	GF	GA	GD	Pts	Qualification	PSV	CSKA	MUN	WOL
1	(Netherlands) PSV Eindhoven	6	3	1	2	10	9	+1	10	Advance to round of 16	—	2–1	0–3	2–1
2	(Russia) CSKA Moscow	6	2	2	2	10	6	+4	8 (Note: Ranked by head-to-head record (CSKA Moscow: 4 pts; Manchester United: 1 pt).)	Advance to play-offs	0–0	—	4–0	1–2
3	(England) Manchester United	6	2	2	2	6	10	−4	8		0–5	0–0	—	1–1
4	(Germany) VfL Wolfsburg	6	2	1	3	10	11	−1	7		4–1	2–4	0–2	—

Source: UEFA

=== Group C ===
Pos	Team	Pld	W	D	L	GF	GA	GD	Pts	Qualification	BEN	ATM	GAL	AST
1	(Portugal) Benfica	6	5	1	0	29	3	+26	16	Advance to round of 16	—	1–1	2–0	8–0
2	(Spain) Atlético Madrid	6	4	1	1	25	5	+20	13	Advance to play-offs	1–2	—	4–0	7–1
3	(Turkey) Galatasaray	6	2	0	4	8	20	−12	6		1–11	1–3	—	3–0
4	(Kazakhstan) Astana	6	0	0	6	1	35	−34	0		0–5	0–9	0–3	—

Source: UEFA

=== Group D ===
Pos	Team	Pld	W	D	L	GF	GA	GD	Pts	Qualification	MCI	SEV	JUV	BMG
1	(England) Manchester City	6	3	2	1	11	6	+5	11 (Note: Ranked by head-to-head record (Manchester City: 4 pts; Sevilla: 1 pt).)	Advance to round of 16	—	1–1	4–1	1–1
2	(Spain) Sevilla	6	3	2	1	9	7	+2	11	Advance to play-offs	0–2	—	1–0	4–2
3	(Italy) Juventus	6	2	0	4	7	11	−4	6		2–1	0–1	—	2–1
4	(Germany) Borussia Mönchengladbach	6	1	2	3	10	13	−3	5		1–2	2–2	3–2	—

Source: UEFA

=== Group E ===
Pos	Team	Pld	W	D	L	GF	GA	GD	Pts	Qualification	BAR	ROM	LEV	BATE
1	(Spain) Barcelona	6	3	3	0	10	4	+6	12	Advance to round of 16	—	3–3	1–1	2–0
2	(Italy) Roma	6	2	3	1	12	6	+6	9	Advance to play-offs	0–0	—	5–1	3–0
3	(Germany) Bayer Leverkusen	6	2	2	2	6	9	−3	8		0–1	2–1	—	1–0
4	(Belarus) BATE Borisov	6	0	2	4	1	10	−9	2		0–3	0–0	1–1	—

Source: UEFA

=== Group F ===
Pos	Team	Pld	W	D	L	GF	GA	GD	Pts	Qualification	DZG	ARS	OLY	BAY
1	(Croatia) Dinamo Zagreb	6	3	1	2	9	8	+1	10 (Note: Ranked by head-to-head record (Dinamo Zagreb: 7 pts; Arsenal: 6 pts; Olympiacos: 4 pts).)	Advance to round of 16	—	0–2	2–2	0–1
2	(England) Arsenal	6	3	1	2	9	7	+2	10	Advance to play-offs	1–2	—	3–2	2–0
3	(Greece) Olympiacos	6	3	1	2	9	8	+1	10		1–3	2–0	—	1–0
4	(Germany) Bayern Munich	6	1	1	4	3	7	−4	4		1–2	1–1	0–1	—

Source: UEFA

=== Group G ===
Pos	Team	Pld	W	D	L	GF	GA	GD	Pts	Qualification	CHE	DKV	POR	MTA
1	(England) Chelsea	6	4	2	0	15	4	+11	14	Advance to round of 16	—	3–1	0–0	3–0
2	(Ukraine) Dynamo Kyiv	6	3	1	2	7	7	0	10	Advance to play-offs	0–2	—	2–1	2–0
3	(Portugal) Porto	6	2	2	2	8	7	+1	8		3–3	0–1	—	2–0
4	(Israel) Maccabi Tel Aviv	6	0	1	5	2	14	−12	1		0–4	1–1	1–2	—

Source: UEFA

=== Group H ===
Pos	Team	Pld	W	D	L	GF	GA	GD	Pts	Qualification	LYO	VAL	ZEN	GNT
1	(France) Lyon	6	4	1	1	16	4	+12	13 (Note: Ranked by head-to-head record (Lyon: 4 pts; Valencia: 1 pt).)	Advance to round of 16	—	1–0	6–0	4–0
2	(Spain) Valencia	6	4	1	1	13	3	+10	13	Advance to play-offs	1–1	—	2–0	5–1
3	(Russia) Zenit Saint Petersburg	6	2	0	4	5	11	−6	6		3–1	0–1	—	0–1
4	(Belgium) Gent	6	1	0	5	2	18	−16	3		0–3	0–4	0–2	—

Source: UEFA

== Domestic Champions Path ==
For the Domestic Champions Path, the 32 teams were drawn into two rounds of two-legged home-and-away ties. The draw was held on 1 September 2015. There were no seedings, but the 32 teams were split into four groups defined by sporting and geographical criteria prior to the draw.

- In the first round, teams in the same group were drawn against each other.
- In the second round, the winners from Group 1 were drawn against the winners from Group 2, and the winners from Group 3 were drawn against the winners from Group 4, with the order of legs decided by draw.

The eight second round winners advanced to the play-offs, where they were joined by the eight group runners-up from the UEFA Champions League Path.

If the aggregate scores were level after full-time of the second leg, the away goals rule was used to decide the winner. If still tied, the match was decided by a penalty shoot-out (no extra time was played).

=== First round ===
The first legs were played on 29 and 30 September, and the second legs were played on 7, 14, 20 and 21 October 2015.

Team 1	Agg.	Team 2	1st leg	2nd leg
Villarreal (Spain)	4–4 (a)	(Switzerland) Servette	2–3	2–1
APOEL (Cyprus)	4–9	(Hungary) Puskás Akadémia	3–3	1–6
Senica (Slovakia)	1–2	(Italy) Torino	0–0	1–2
Rad (Serbia)	1–1 (3–2 p)	(Slovenia) Domžale	0–1	1–0
Reims (France)	5–6	(England) Middlesbrough	5–3	0–3
IF Elfsborg (Sweden)	2–1	(Iceland) Stjarnan	2–0	0–1
Brann (Norway)	1–6	(Belgium) Anderlecht	1–1	0–5
HJK (Finland)	1–6	(Scotland) Celtic	0–5	1–1
Schalke 04 (Germany)	2–5	(Netherlands) Ajax	2–3	0–2
Příbram (Czech Republic)	4–1	(Moldova) Zimbru Chișinău	2–0	2–1
Red Bull Salzburg (Austria)	5–2	(Bosnia and Herzegovina) Željezničar	4–0	1–2
Midtjylland (Denmark)	5–2 (Note: Order of legs reversed after original draw.)	(Georgia (country)) Saburtalo Tbilisi	3–1	2–1
Aktobe (Kazakhstan)	0–6	(Turkey) Beşiktaş	0–2	0–4
Spartak Moscow (Russia)	4–0	(Azerbaijan) Ravan Baku	4–0	0–0
Minsk (Belarus)	3–7	(Romania) Viitorul Constanța	2–2	1–5
Litex Lovech (Bulgaria)	2–5	(Poland) Legia Warsaw	1–2	1–3

=== Second round ===
The first legs were played on 4, 5 November and 2 December, and the second legs were played on 24, 25 November and 6 December 2015.

Team 1	Agg.	Team 2	1st leg	2nd leg
Puskás Akadémia (Hungary)	1–3	(Scotland) Celtic	1–0	0–3
Rad (Serbia)	0–1	(Sweden) IF Elfsborg	0–1	0–0
Servette (Switzerland)	3–4 (Note: Order of legs reversed after original draw.)	(Belgium) Anderlecht	1–2	2–2
Middlesbrough (England)	6–3	(Italy) Torino	3–0	3–3
Spartak Moscow (Russia)	1–5	(Netherlands) Ajax	0–3	1–2
Beşiktaş (Turkey)	2–5	(Austria) Red Bull Salzburg	1–0	1–5
Midtjylland (Denmark)	5–1	(Poland) Legia Warsaw	2–0	3–1
Příbram (Czech Republic)	2–0	(Romania) Viitorul Constanța	2–0	0–0

== Knockout phase ==
For the knockout phase, the teams were drawn into a single-elimination tournament, with all ties played over one match. The knockout round play-off draw was held on 14 December 2015, while the draw for the round of 16 onwards was held on 15 February 2016. The mechanism of the draws for each round was as follows:

- In the draw for the knockout round play-offs, the eight second round winners from the Domestic Champions Path were drawn against the eight group runners-up from the UEFA Champions League Path, with the teams from the Domestic Champions Path hosting the match. Teams from the same association could not be drawn against each other.
- In the draw for the round of 16, the eight group winners from the UEFA Champions League Path were drawn against the eight play-off winners. Teams from the same UEFA Champions League Path group could not be drawn against each other, but teams from the same association could be drawn against each other. The draw also decided the home team for each round of 16 match.
- In the draws for the quarter-finals onwards, there were no seedings, and teams from the same UEFA Champions League Path group or the same association could be drawn against each other. The draws also decided the home team for each quarter-final, and the "home" team for administrative purposes for each semi-final and final (which were played at a neutral venue).

If the scores were level after full-time, the match was decided by a penalty shoot-out (no extra time was played).

=== Bracket ===
Knockout round play-offs
(Sweden) IF Elfsborg	1
(Spain) Real Madrid	3
(Czech Republic) Příbram (p)	1 (5)
(Russia) CSKA Moscow	1 (4)
(England) Middlesbrough	5
(Ukraine) Dynamo Kyiv	0
(Austria) Red Bull Salzburg	0
(Italy) Roma	4
(Scotland) Celtic	1 (3)
(Spain) Valencia (p)	1 (4)
(Netherlands) Ajax	3
(Spain) Sevilla	1
(Belgium) Anderlecht	2
(England) Arsenal	0
(Denmark) Midtjylland (p)	4 (5)
(Spain) Atlético Madrid	4 (4)

Round of 16
(Spain) Real Madrid	3
(England) Manchester City	1
(Czech Republic) Příbram	1 (3)
(Portugal) Benfica (p)	1 (5)
(France) Paris Saint-Germain	1
(England) Middlesbrough	0
(Netherlands) PSV Eindhoven	2 (1)
(Italy) Roma (p)	2 (3)
(England) Chelsea (p)	1 (5)
(Spain) Valencia	1 (3)
(France) Lyon	0
(Netherlands) Ajax	3
(Belgium) Anderlecht	3
(Croatia) Dinamo Zagreb	0
(Spain) Barcelona	3
(Denmark) Midtjylland	1

Quarter-finals
(Spain) Real Madrid	2
(Portugal) Benfica	0
(France) Paris Saint-Germain	3
(Italy) Roma	1
(England) Chelsea	1
(Netherlands) Ajax	0
(Belgium) Anderlecht	2
(Spain) Barcelona	0

Semi-finals
15 April – Nyon
(Spain) Real Madrid	1
(France) Paris Saint-Germain	3
15 April – Nyon
(England) Chelsea	3
(Belgium) Anderlecht	0

Final
18 April – Nyon
(France) Paris Saint-Germain	1
(England) Chelsea	2

=== Knockout round play-offs ===
The play-offs were played on 9 and 10 February 2016. The eight play-off winners advanced to the round of 16, where they were joined by the eight group winners from the UEFA Champions League Path.

Home team	Score	Away team
Ajax (Netherlands)	3–1	(Spain) Sevilla
Příbram (Czech Republic)	2–2 (5–4 p)	(Russia) CSKA Moscow
Red Bull Salzburg (Austria)	0–4	(Italy) Roma
Anderlecht (Belgium)	2–0	(England) Arsenal
Celtic (Scotland)	1–1 (3–4 p)	(Spain) Valencia
IF Elfsborg (Sweden)	1–3	(Spain) Real Madrid
Middlesbrough (England)	5–0	(Ukraine) Dynamo Kyiv
Midtjylland (Denmark)	4–4 (5–4 p)	(Spain) Atlético Madrid

=== Round of 16 ===
The round of 16 matches were played on 23 and 24 February 2016.

Home team	Score	Away team
PSV Eindhoven (Netherlands)	2–2 (1–3 p)	(Italy) Roma
Příbram (Czech Republic)	1–1 (3–5 p)	(Portugal) Benfica
Anderlecht (Belgium)	3–0 (Note: Match originally finished 0–2 in favour of Dinamo Zagreb, but was awarded by UEFA as 3–0 win for Anderlecht due to Dinamo Zagreb fielding suspended player Matija Fintić.)	(Croatia) Dinamo Zagreb
Lyon (France)	0–3	(Netherlands) Ajax
Chelsea (England)	1–1 (5–3 p)	(Spain) Valencia
Real Madrid (Spain)	3–1	(England) Manchester City
Paris Saint-Germain (France)	1–0	(England) Middlesbrough
Barcelona (Spain)	3–1	(Denmark) Midtjylland

=== Quarter-finals ===
The quarter-finals were played on 8, 9 and 15 March 2016.

Home team	Score	Away team
Chelsea (England)	1–0	(Netherlands) Ajax
Paris Saint-Germain (France)	3–1	(Italy) Roma
Anderlecht (Belgium)	2–0	(Spain) Barcelona
Real Madrid (Spain)	2–0	(Portugal) Benfica

=== Semi-finals ===
The semi-finals were played on 15 April 2016 at Colovray Stadium, Nyon.

Team 1	Score	Team 2
Real Madrid (Spain)	1–3	(France) Paris Saint-Germain
Chelsea (England)	3–0	(Belgium) Anderlecht

=== Final ===
The final was played on 18 April 2016 at Colovray Stadium, Nyon.

18 April 2016
17:00 UTC+2

Paris Saint-Germain (France)	1–2	(England) Chelsea
Meïté 58'	Report	Tomori 10'; Palmer 61'

Colovray Stadium, Nyon
Attendance: 4,000
Referee: Daniel Siebert (Germany)

== Statistics ==
=== Top goalscorers ===
Rank	Player	Team	Goals	Minutes played
1	(Spain) Roberto Núñez	(Spain) Atlético Madrid	9	624
2	(Spain) Borja Mayoral	(Spain) Real Madrid	8	614
2	(England) Tammy Abraham	(England) Chelsea	8	810
4	(Portugal) José Gomes	(Portugal) Benfica	7	328
4	(Portugal) Diogo Gonçalves	(Portugal) Benfica	7	496
6	(Spain) Rafael Mir	(Spain) Valencia	6	617
6	(Belgium) Jorn Vancamp	(Belgium) Anderlecht	6	633
6	(Spain) Carles Aleñá	(Spain) Barcelona	6	716
9	(Germany) Leandro Putaro	(Germany) VfL Wolfsburg	5	410
9	(Jamaica) Kasey Palmer	(England) Chelsea	5	545
9	(France) Jean-Kévin Augustin	(France) Paris Saint-Germain	5	641
9	(Nigeria) Umar Sadiq	(Italy) Roma	5	769

Source: UEFA

=== Top assists ===
Rank	Player	Team	Assists	Minutes played
1	(England) Harrison Chapman	(England) Middlesbrough	8	540
2	(Netherlands) Sam Lammers	(Netherlands) PSV Eindhoven	4	512
2	(Spain) Fran Villalba	(Spain) Valencia	4	546
2	(France) Théo Chendri	(Spain) Barcelona	4	570
2	(Nigeria) Umar Sadiq	(Italy) Roma	4	769
2	(France) Christopher Nkunku	(France) Paris Saint-Germain	4	788

Source: UEFA
