= Marco Hödl =

Austrian footballer

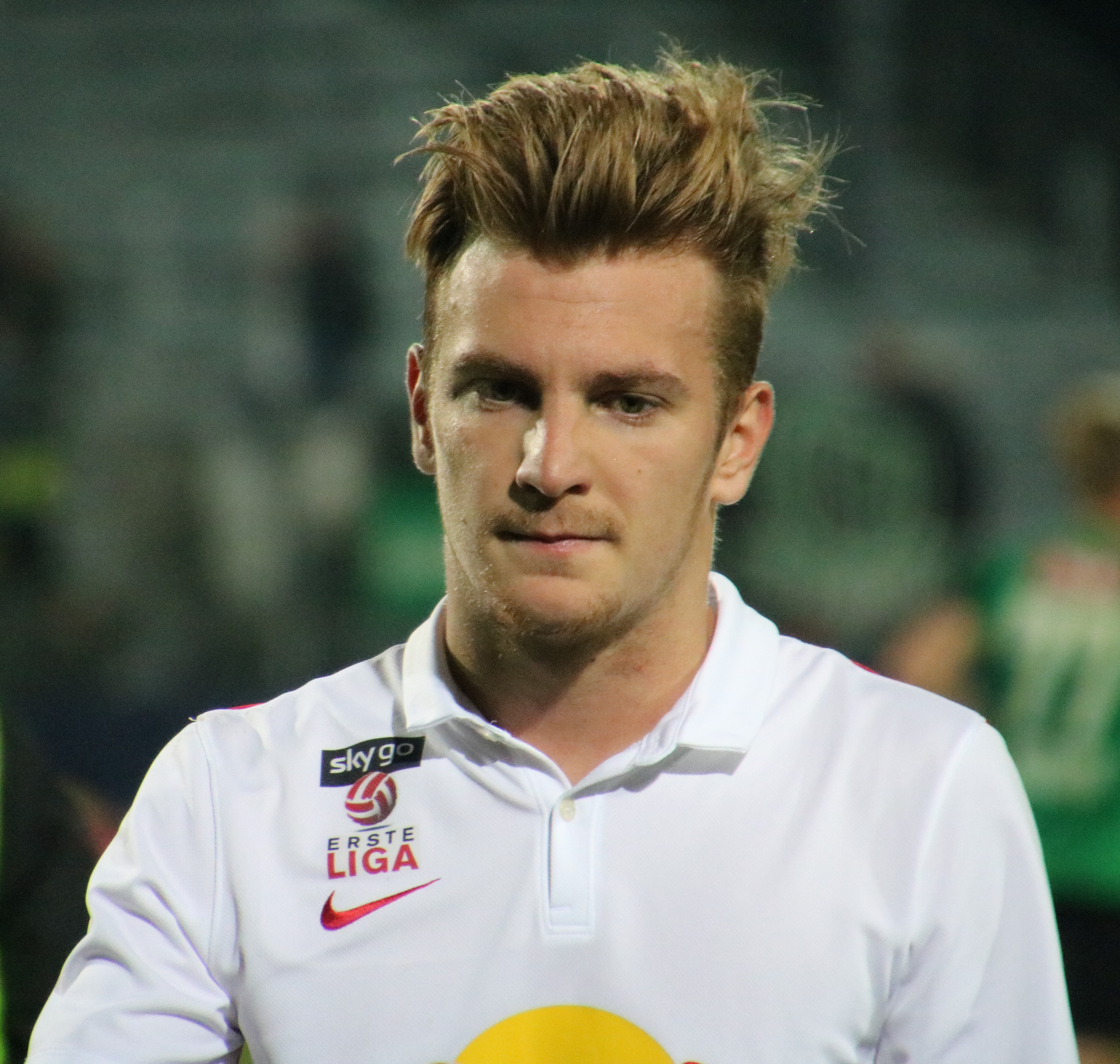
- Hödl with Liefering in 2015

Personal information
- Date of birth: 10 January 1997 (age 29)
- Height: 1.77 m (5 ft 10 in)
- Position: Forward

Team information
- Current team: SV Kuchl

Youth career
- 2002–2003: SC Seiersberg
- 2003–2011: SK Sturm Graz
- 2011–2016: FC Red Bull Salzburg

Senior career*
Years	Team	Apps	(Gls)
2015–2016	FC Liefering	8	(1)
2016–2017	SKN St. Pölten II	12	(1)
2017	TSV Hartberg	5	(0)
2017–2018	USK Anif	32	(32)
2018-2019	SK Austria Klagenfurt	23	(1)
2019-2023	Austria Salzburg	90	(54)
2023-	SV Kuchl	2	(3)

International career^{‡}
2012–2013	Austria U-16	17	(12)
2013–2014	Austria U-17	5	(1)
2016	Austria U-19	2	(1)
- * Club domestic league appearances and goals as of 11 November 2017 ‡ National team caps and goals as of 25 February 2016

Marco Hödl (born 10 January 1997) is an Austrian football player who plays as a forward for Salzburger Liga club SV Kuchl.

== Club career ==
He made his Austrian Football First League debut for FC Liefering on 24 July 2015 in a game against SK Austria Klagenfurt.
