= Yoann Martelat =

French football player (born 1997)

Personal information
- Date of birth: 16 January 1997 (age 29)
- Place of birth: Lyon, France
- Height: 1.73 m (5 ft 8 in)
- Position: Midfielder

Team information
- Current team: Lyon-La Duchère
- Number: 28

Youth career
- 2003–2008: Charvieu-Chavagneu
- 2008–2010: Saint-Priest
- 2010–2016: Lyon

Senior career*
Years	Team	Apps	(Gls)
2014–2018	Lyon II	50	(3)
2019–2020	Sloboda Tuzla	10	(0)
2020	Salaise		
2020–2022	Saint-Priest	32	(1)
2022–2025	Thonon Evian	43	(3)
2025–	Lyon-La Duchère	9	(0)
- * Club domestic league appearances and goals as of 7 February 2026

Yoann Martelat (born 16 January 1997) is a French footballer who plays for Championnat National 3 club Lyon-La Duchère.

== Career ==
Martelat started his senior career with Olympique Lyonnais. In 2019, he signed for FK Sloboda Tuzla in the Premier League of Bosnia and Herzegovina, where he made ten league appearances and scored zero goals. After that, he signed for Salaise, where he spent five months. He then signed for AS Saint-Priest in the French fourth tier where he played thirty-two league games and scored one goal in two seasons. In 2022, he signed for Thonon Evian GGFC.
