= Jordi Tur =

Spanish footballer (born 1998)

Personal information
- Full name: Jordi Tur Antonio
- Date of birth: 19 May 1998 (age 28)
- Place of birth: Ibiza, Spain
- Height: 1.75 m (5 ft 9 in)
- Position: Midfielder

Team information
- Current team: Lausanne Ouchy
- Number: 80

Youth career
- –2012: Penya Blanc i Blava d'Eivissa
- 2012–2014: Sant Rafel
- 2014–2017: Barcelona

Senior career*
Years	Team	Apps	(Gls)
2017–2021	Cádiz	0	(0)
2017–2021	→ Cádiz B (loan)	117	(10)
2020	→ Córdoba (loan)	0	(0)
2021–2023	Numancia	46	(2)
2023–2025	Unionistas	52	(1)
2025–2026	SKA-Khabarovsk	24	(0)
2026–	Lausanne Ouchy	7	(1)
- * Club domestic league appearances and goals as of 20 September 2026

Jordi Tur Antonio (born 19 May 1998) is a Spanish professional footballer who plays as a midfielder for Swiss Challenge League club Lausanne Ouchy.

== Early life ==
Tur was born on 19 May 1998. Born in Ibiza, Spain, he is a native of the city.

== Career ==
Tur started his career with Spanish side Cádiz in 2017, where he made zero league appearances and scored zero goals. In 2020, he was sent on loan to Spanish side Córdoba, where he made zero league appearances and scored zero goals. Following his stint there, he signed for Spanish side Numancia in 2021, where he made forty-six league appearances and scored two goals.

During the summer of 2023, he signed for Spanish side Unionistas, where he made fifty-two league appearances and scored one goal. Ahead of the 2025–26 season, he signed for Russian side SKA-Khabarovsk. He left Khabarovsk in June 2026.

== Style of play ==
Tur plays as a midfielder and is right-footed. Spanish news website Vavel wrote in 2019 that he is "equipped with distinguished versatility capable of infusing both the midfield and elegantly flanking the right flank... admired for his brilliant capacity for sacrifice and adored for his humility".
