= Artyom Ponikarov =

Russian footballer

Personal information
- Full name: Artyom Antonovich Ponikarov
- Date of birth: 5 January 1997 (age 29)
- Place of birth: Saint Petersburg, Russia
- Height: 1.84 m (6 ft 0 in)
- Position: Defender

Team information
- Current team: Tandem Moscow

Youth career
- 2005–2007: SDYuSShOR-2 Moskovskaya zastava (Saint Petersburg)
- 2007–2016: Zenit Saint Petersburg
- 2016: Master-Saturn

Senior career*
| Years | Team | Apps | (Gls) |
| 2017 | Afips Afipsky | 3 | (0) |
| 2017–2018 | Lokomotiv Moscow | 0 | (0) |
| 2017–2018 | → Kazanka Moscow | 2 | (0) |
| 2018–2019 | Torpedo Moscow | 18 | (1) |
| 2019–2020 | Chernomorets Novorossiysk | 19 | (1) |
| 2020 | Slutsk | 7 | (0) |
| 2021–2023 | Rodina Moscow | 32 | (0) |
| 2022–2023 | → Rodina-2 Moscow | 5 | (0) |
| 2023–2024 | Rodina Media Moscow (amateur) | | |
| 2025– | Tandem Moscow (amateur) | | |

Managerial career
- 2024: Academy Rodina Moscow
- * Club domestic league appearances and goals

Artyom Antonovich Ponikarov (Russian: Артём Антонович Поникаров; born 5 January 1997) is a Russian former footballer who played as a defender.

== Club career ==
He made his debut in the Russian Second League for Afips Afipsky on 16 April 2017 in a game against Kuban-2 Krasnodar.

He made his debut in the Belarusian Premier League for Slutsk on 27 September 2020 in a game against Rukh Brest.
