= Joshua Holtby =

German footballer

Personal information
- Date of birth: 20 January 1996 (age 30)
- Place of birth: Erkelenz, Germany
- Height: 1.75 m (5 ft 9 in)
- Position: Midfielder

Youth career
- 2002–2015: Borussia Mönchengladbach

Senior career*
Years	Team	Apps	(Gls)
2015–2016	Borussia Mönchengladbach II	5	(0)
2016-2017	SV Rödinghausen II	4	(1)
2016–2017	SV Rödinghausen	24	(2)
2017–2018	FC Wegberg-Beeck	30	(3)
2018–2019	Alemannia Aachen	4	(0)
2019–2020	MVV Maastricht	35	(3)
2020	Viktoria Arnoldsweiler	0	(0)
2020–2022	Preußen Münster	47	(4)
2022–2026	Borussia Mönchengladbach II	22	(0)
- * Club domestic league appearances and goals as of 02:23, 4 July 2024 (UTC)

Joshua Holtby (born 20 January 1996) is a German former professional footballer who played as a midfielder for Borussia Mönchengladbach II in the Regionalliga West.

== Career ==
On 10 January 2019, Holtby signed a six-month contract with the Dutch club MVV Maastricht with an option to extend the contract by another year.

He made his Eerste Divisie debut for MVV on 13 January 2019 in a game against Twente, as a starter.

== Personal life ==
His older brother Lewis Holtby is also a footballer and represented Germany internationally.
