= João Cardoso (footballer, born 1997) =

Portuguese footballer

Personal information
- Full name: João Pedro Pinto Cardoso
- Date of birth: 10 February 1997 (age 29)
- Place of birth: Porto, Portugal
- Height: 1.71 m (5 ft 7 in)
- Position: Midfielder

Team information
- Current team: Torreense
- Number: 20

Youth career
- 2007–2009: Salgueiros
- 2009–2017: Porto
- 2012–2013: → Padroense (loan)

Senior career*
| Years | Team | Apps | (Gls) |
| 2017–2018 | Porto B | 3 | (0) |
| 2018–2020 | Estoril B | 4 | (1) |
| 2018–2020 | Estoril | 1 | (0) |
| 2020–2021 | Sporting da Covilhã | 21 | (0) |
| 2021– | Torreense | 35 | (0) |

International career
| 2015 | Portugal U18 | 5 | (0) |
| 2016 | Portugal U19 | 2 | (0) |
- * Club domestic league appearances and goals as of 26 June 2023

João Pedro Pinto Cardoso (born 10 February 1997) is a Portuguese footballer who plays as a midfielder for Torreense.

== Club career ==
On 14 July 2021, he signed with Torreense.
