= Dimosthenis Chantzaras =

Greek footballer (born 1997)

Personal information
- Date of birth: 8 January 1997 (age 29)
- Place of birth: Giannitsa, Greece
- Height: 1.70 m (5 ft 7 in)
- Position: Winger

Youth career
- 2012–2015: Olympiacos

Senior career*
Years	Team	Apps	(Gls)
2015–2016	Olympiacos	0	(0)
2016–2017	Omonia	1	(0)
2017–2018	Anagennisi Karditsa	26	(3)
2018–2020	Panathinaikos	0	(0)
2018	→ Sparta (loan)		
2018–2020	→ Veria (loan)	14	(1)
2020–2021	Pierikos	0	(0)
2021	Almopos Aridea	16	(2)
2021–2022	Pierikos	20	(1)
2022–2023	Edessaikos	0	(0)

International career^{‡}
2013–2014	Greece U17	3	(0)
- * Club domestic league appearances and goals as of 27 April 2022 ‡ National team caps and goals as of 12 February 2014

Dimosthenis 'Dimos' Chantzaras (Greek: Δημοσθένης 'Δήμος' Χαντζάρας; born 8 January 1997) is a Greek professional footballer who plays as a winger.

== Honours ==
Veria

Gamma Ethniki: 2018–19
