= Orhan Vojic =

Austrian footballer

Orhan Vojić
Personal information
- Date of birth: 20 January 1997 (age 29)
- Place of birth: Linz, Austria
- Height: 1.82 m (6 ft 0 in)
- Position: Forward

Youth career
- –2015: AKA Linz
- 2015–2016: VfL Wolfsburg

Senior career*
Years	Team	Apps	(Gls)
2015	LASK Juniors OÖ	11	(3)
2015	LASK Linz	1	(0)
2016–2018	VfL Wolfsburg II	24	(4)
2019	Shamrock Rovers	12	(2)
- * Club domestic league appearances and goals as of 15 February 2019

Orhan Vojić (born 20 January 1997) is an Austrian football player of Bosnian descent. He plays for SK Vorwärts Steyr in the Austrian Football Second League.

== Club career ==
He made his Austrian Football First League debut for LASK Linz on 29 May 2015 in a game against Floridsdorfer AC.

In February 2019 Vojić signed for Shamrock Rovers F.C. of the League of Ireland after impressing on trial for the club in pre-season.
