= Juan Moreno (footballer) =

Spanish footballer (born 1997)

Personal information
- Full name: Juan Moreno Fernández
- Date of birth: 11 May 1997 (age 29)
- Place of birth: Móstoles, Spain
- Height: 1.82 m (6 ft 0 in)
- Position: Winger

Team information
- Current team: Ordino
- Number: 17

Youth career
- 2007–2016: Atlético Madrid

Senior career*
Years	Team	Apps	(Gls)
2016–2018	Atlético Madrid B	52	(5)
2016	Atlético Madrid	0	(0)
2018–2019	Cartagena	1	(0)
2019	Navalcarnero	1	(0)
2019–2020	Betis B	12	(2)
2020	Arandina	0	(0)
2020–2021	Fuenlabrada B	10	(1)
2021–2022	Cristo Atlético	23	(0)
2022–2023	Marchamalo	20	(4)
2023–	Ordino	17	(3)
- * Club domestic league appearances and goals as of 27 May 2024

Juan Moreno Fernández (born 11 May 1997) is a Spanish professional footballer who plays for Ordino in the Andorran Primera Divisió as a right winger.

== Club career ==
Born in Móstoles, Madrid, Moreno joined Atlético Madrid's youth setup in 2007, aged ten. In July 2016 he was promoted to the reserves in Tercera División, making his senior debut on 4 September by coming on as a late substitute in a 2–0 home win against CF Trival Valderas.

On 18 September 2016 Moreno scored his first senior goal, netting the game's only in a home success over Rayo Vallecano B. He made his first team debut on 30 November, replacing fellow debutant Caio Henrique in a 6–0 away routing of CD Guijuelo, for the season's Copa del Rey.

On 21 January 2019, Moreno joined CDA Navalcarnero, but had his contract terminated on 2 April, after only played 20 minutes played. On 25 July, he moved to another reserve team, Betis Deportivo Balompié in the fourth division.

On 22 October 2020, Moreno signed for Arandina CF also in division four, but left the club on 6 November. He subsequently represented CF Fuenlabrada's B-team before joining Segunda División RFEF side CD Palencia Cristo Atlético.
