= Kasey Palmer =

Jamaican footballer (born 1996)

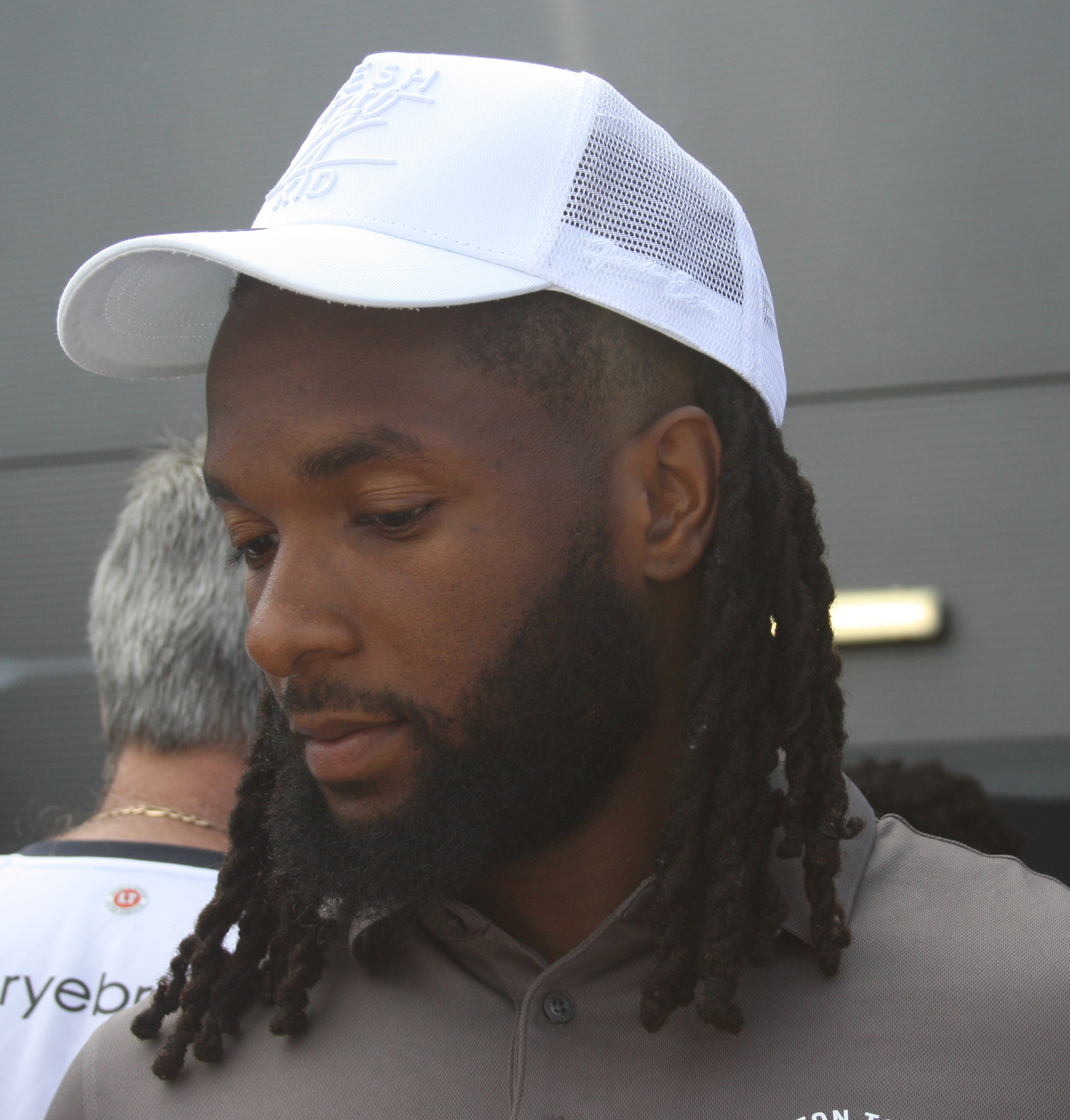
- Palmer in 2026

Personal information
- Full name: Kasey Remel Palmer
- Date of birth: 9 November 1996 (age 30)
- Place of birth: Lewisham, England
- Height: 1.82 m (6 ft 0 in)
- Position: Attacking midfielder

Team information
- Current team: Luton Town
- Number: 45

Youth career
- 2005–2013: Charlton Athletic
- 2013–2016: Chelsea

Senior career*
Years	Team	Apps	(Gls)
2016–2019	Chelsea	0	(0)
2016–2017	→ Huddersfield Town (loan)	24	(4)
2017–2018	→ Huddersfield Town (loan)	4	(0)
2018	→ Derby County (loan)	15	(2)
2018–2019	→ Blackburn Rovers (loan)	14	(1)
2019	→ Bristol City (loan)	15	(2)
2019–2022	Bristol City	54	(4)
2020–2021	→ Swansea City (loan)	12	(1)
2022–2024	Coventry City	64	(6)
2024–2026	Hull City	35	(1)
2026	→ Luton Town (loan)	20	(8)
2026–	Luton Town	15	(3)

International career^{‡}
2013	England U17	3	(0)
2013	England U18	1	(0)
2016	England U20	2	(2)
2016–2017	England U21	6	(1)
2021–	Jamaica	25	(3)
Medal record
Men's football
Representing Jamaica
CONCACAF Nations League
Bronze medal – third place	2024	Team
- * Club domestic league appearances and goals as of 19:05, 21 November 2026 (UTC) ‡ National team caps and goals as of 08:47, 30 September 2026 (UTC)

Kasey Remel Palmer (born 9 November 1996) is a professional footballer who plays as an attacking midfielder for EFL League One club Luton Town. Born in England, he plays for the Jamaica national team.

== Club career ==
=== Chelsea ===
Palmer joined the Charlton Athletic academy at the age of nine, and featured for the club for the majority of his youth career. After representing England at youth level, Palmer attracted interest from Chelsea and made the move in March 2013.

After making a handful of appearances for the Under-18s during the remainder of his first season, Palmer became an influential figure in Adi Viveash's side for the 2013–14 season while also making occasional appearances at higher age levels.

While playing for the Under-21s, he contributed to their successful season in which they won the league and FA Youth Cup, becoming a regular for the side from the 2014–15 season.

In 2015, Palmer played in the club's four knockout games in the 2014–15 UEFA Youth League, as well as scoring against Zenit St Petersburg in the round of 16. Chelsea went on to win the competition after a 3–2 victory against Shakhtar Donetsk on 13 April.

The 2015–16 season also proved successful for Palmer, who scored three goals in five matches as they retained their title.

Tipped as one of the academy's most promising talents, Palmer signed a new contract in February 2016, which committed his future to the club until the end of the 2018–19 season. He was given his first taste of senior football under first team manager Guus Hiddink, being named as an unused substitute in a Premier League match against Swansea City in April 2016.

==== Loan to Huddersfield Town ====
On 15 July 2016, Palmer joined Championship side Huddersfield Town on a season-long loan. He made his professional debut on 6 August, replacing Jack Payne in the 78th minute of a 2–1 win over Brentford. Palmer scored the winning goal after a minute on the pitch with just his second touch of the ball. In the following league game against Newcastle United, Palmer once again came off the bench in the second-half, where he went on to set up Payne to score the winner with a through-ball to earn their second straight win. After an extended period out through injury, Palmer returned to action in the Championship play-off final as Huddersfield won promotion to the Premier League.

On 3 July 2017, Palmer signed a contract extension with Chelsea tying him to the club until 2021. A day later, Palmer's loan spell at Huddersfield Town was extended for a further season.

On 2 January 2018, Palmer announced via Twitter that he would be returning to Chelsea following the termination of his loan, after only featuring in five games for Huddersfield that season.

==== Loan to Derby County ====
On 31 January 2018, Palmer joined Championship side Derby County on loan for the remainder of the 2017–18 season. He scored his first goal for Derby in a 2–2 draw against Leeds United on 21 February 2018.

==== Loan to Blackburn Rovers ====
On 30 July 2018, Palmer joined Championship side Blackburn Rovers on a season-long loan.

==== Loan to Bristol City ====
In January 2019, Palmer joined Championship side Bristol City on a season-long loan. In his first game, he came off of the bench to score on his debut in a 2–1 win against Bolton Wanderers.

=== Bristol City ===
On 1 August 2019, Palmer signed permanently for Bristol City on a four-year deal for a fee believed to be around £3.5 million. He stated that the main reasons for joining were to gain more stability and play under manager Lee Johnson.

==== Loan to Swansea City ====
On 16 October 2020, Palmer joined fellow Championship side Swansea City on a season-long loan. He scored his first goal for Swansea in a 2–0 win over Stoke City on 27 October 2020. On 5 January 2021, Palmer was recalled from this loan spell by his parent club Bristol City.

=== Coventry City ===
On 21 June 2022, Palmer signed for Championship club Coventry City for an undisclosed fee. He signed a three-year deal, with manager Mark Robins describing him as "a player with great technical and creative ability who we are excited to be working with".

Palmer was a substitute in the 2023 play-off final against his future club Luton Town. Palmer had been set to miss the final through an injury he had picked up earlier that season, however declared himself fit to take part and was handed a place on the bench. Palmer was brought on in the 80th minute of the final but was later withdrawn in extra-time. Coventry lost the match after a penalty shootout.

On 20 January 2024, Palmer was the victim of alleged racial abuse in a league match away at Sheffield Wednesday. The incident received global condemnation with many taking the time to express their support to Palmer, including FIFA president Gianni Infantino. Coventry and Sheffield Wednesday met again just two weeks later on 6 February 2024 in the FA Cup. Palmer opened the scoring in the 3rd minute and lifted his shirt to reveal the words 'Less talk, more action' on his base layer.

=== Hull City ===
On 30 August 2024, Palmer signed a three-year deal with fellow Championship club Hull City for an undisclosed fee.

==== Loan to Luton Town ====
On 22 January 2026, Palmer was loaned to League One club Luton Town until the end of the season. He made his debut for the club on 24 January in a 1–0 defeat away to Plymouth Argyle.

Palmer scored his first goal for the club on 10 March 2026, in a 1–1 draw against Doncaster Rovers. He was a major part of the club's impressive form towards the end of the 2025–26 season - scoring 8 goals in 10 appearances.

He was in the squad for the 2026 EFL Trophy final, in which Luton achieved a 3–1 win against Stockport County. He was named EFL League One Player of the Month for April 2026, having registered five goals and one assist.

=== Luton Town ===
On 5 July 2026, Palmer signed permanently for Luton Town in a deal believed to be worth £500,000. Throughout his loan spell at the club he had expressed a desire to sign permanently, with Luton fans and manager Jack Wilshere both praising his performances.

== International career ==
=== England youth career ===
Palmer made his debut for England Under-17s on 8 February 2013, playing for seven minutes in a 2–1 defeat to Germany. His second appearance came just two days later when England suffered another 2–1 defeat, this time to Portugal. His final appearance for the Under-17s came later that week when he came off the bench in a 1–0 defeat to the Netherlands.

Palmer made a single appearance for England Under-18s on 14 October 2013. He played 73 minutes of a 4–0 win over Hungary at St George's Park - his first international match in England.

After impressive displays for his club, Palmer received his first Under-20s call-up, two-and-a-half years after his previous international appearance. He played 45 minutes in a 2–1 defeat to Canada on 27 March 2016 and marked his debut with England's only goal of the game.

In May 2016, Palmer was part of the England Under-21s squad crowned champions of the 2016 Toulon Tournament.

=== Jamaica ===
In March 2021, Palmer was one of eight English-born players to receive their first call-up to the Jamaica national team. He made his full international debut on 25 March 2021, in a 4–1 loss to the United States at the Wiener Neustadt Arena in Austria.

On 28 May 2025, he scored his first goal for Jamaica, a penalty, during a 3–2 win in the 2025 Unity Cup against Trinidad and Tobago at the Brentford Community Stadium in London.

On 31 March 2026, Palmer played in one of two inter-confederation play-off finals, missing out on qualification for the 2026 World Cup after a 1–0 defeat against the Democratic Republic of the Congo at Estadio Akron in Mexico.

== Career statistics ==
=== Club ===
As of match played 21 November 2026

Appearances and goals by club, season and competition
Club	Season	League			FA Cup		League Cup		Other		Total	
Club	Season	Division	Apps	Goals	Apps	Goals	Apps	Goals	Apps	Goals	Apps	Goals
Chelsea	2016–17	Premier League	0	0	0	0	0	0	0	0	0	0
Chelsea	2017–18	Premier League	0	0	0	0	0	0	0	0	0	0
Chelsea	2018–19	Premier League	0	0	0	0	0	0	0	0	0	0
Chelsea	Total		0	0	0	0	0	0	0	0	0	0
Huddersfield Town (loan)	2016–17	Championship	24	4	1	1	1	0	1 (Note: Appearance in Championship play-offs)	0	27	5
Huddersfield Town (loan)	2017–18	Premier League	4	0	0	0	1	0	0	0	5	0
Derby County (loan)	2017–18	Championship	15	2	0	0	0	0	1	0	16	2
Blackburn Rovers (loan)	2018–19	Championship	14	1	0	0	3	2	0	0	17	3
Bristol City (loan)	2018–19	Championship	15	2	2	0	0	0	0	0	17	2
Bristol City	2019–20	Championship	25	1	2	0	0	0	0	0	27	1
Bristol City	2020–21	Championship	23	2	2	0	2	2	0	0	27	4
Bristol City	2021–22	Championship	6	1	1	0	1	0	0	0	8	1
Bristol City	Total		54	4	5	0	3	2	0	0	62	6
Swansea City (loan)	2020–21	Championship	12	1	0	0	0	0	0	0	12	1
Coventry City	2022–23	Championship	29	3	1	1	1	0	1	0	32	4
Coventry City	2023–24	Championship	32	2	5	2	1	0	0	0	38	4
Coventry City	2024–25	Championship	3	1	0	0	2	0	0	0	5	1
Coventry City	Total		64	6	6	3	4	0	1	0	75	9
Hull City	2024–25	Championship	26	1	0	0	0	0	0	0	26	1
Hull City	2025–26	Championship	9	0	1	0	1	0	0	0	11	0
Hull City	Total		35	1	1	0	1	0	0	0	37	1
Luton Town (loan)	2025–26	League One	20	8	0	0	0	0	3 (Note: Appearance(s) in EFL Trophy)	0	23	8
Luton Town	2026–27	League One	15	3	1	0	2	0	1 (Note: Appearance(s) in EFL Trophy)	0	19	3
Luton Town	Total		35	11	1	0	2	0	4	0	42	11
Career total			272	32	16	5	15	4	7	0	310	40

=== International ===
As of match played 29 September 2026

Appearances and goals by national team and year
National team	Year	Apps	Goals
Jamaica	2021	1	0
Jamaica	2023	2	0
Jamaica	2024	10	0
Jamaica	2025	9	2
Jamaica	2026	3	1
Total		25	3

Jamaica score listed first, score column indicates score after each Palmer goal

List of international goals scored by Casey Palmer
No.	Date	Venue	Cap	Opponent	Score	Result	Competition	Ref.
1	27 May 2025	Brentford Community Stadium, London, England	14	Trinidad and Tobago	1–0	3–2	2025 Unity Cup	
2	6 September 2025	Bermuda National Stadium, Hamilton, Bermuda	19	Bermuda	3–0	4–0	2026 FIFA World Cup qualification	
3	25 September 2026	Independence Park, Kingston, Jamaica	58	Guatemala	1–1	3–2	2026–27 CONCACAF Nations League A	

== Honours ==
Chelsea

- Under-21 Premier League: 2013–14
- FA Youth Cup: 2013–14, 2014–15
- UEFA Youth League: 2014–15, 2015–16

Huddersfield Town

- EFL Championship play-offs: 2017

Luton Town

- EFL Trophy: 2025–26

England U21

- Toulon Tournament: 2016

Individual

- EFL League One Player of the Month: April 2026
