= Roberto Núñez (footballer) =

Spanish footballer

Roberto
Personal information
- Full name: Roberto Núñez Mañas
- Date of birth: 3 January 1996 (age 30)
- Place of birth: Talavera de la Reina, Spain
- Height: 1.82 m (6 ft 0 in)
- Position: Forward

Team information
- Current team: Águilas

Youth career
- 2006–2015: Atlético Madrid

Senior career*
Years	Team	Apps	(Gls)
2014–2015	Atlético Madrid C	19	(1)
2014–2017	Atlético Madrid B	56	(9)
2016	Atlético Madrid	0	(0)
2017–2018	Royal Antwerp	0	(0)
2018–2020	Las Palmas B	48	(5)
2020–	Águilas	6	(0)

International career
2012	Spain U16	1	(0)
2012–2013	Spain U17	9	(1)
2014	Spain U18	2	(0)
- * Club domestic league appearances and goals as of 20 December 2020

Roberto Núñez Mañas (born 3 January 1996), simply known as Roberto, is a Spanish professional footballer who plays for Águilas FC as a forward.

== Club career ==
Born in Talavera de la Reina, Toledo, Castile-La Mancha, Roberto joined Atlético Madrid's youth setup in 2006, aged ten. He made his senior debut with the reserves on 11 May 2014, coming on as a second half substitute for Xu Xin in a 1–2 away loss against Barakaldo CF in the Segunda División B.

In the 2014 summer, Roberto was definitely promoted to the C-team in Tercera División. The following year, after the reserves' relegation, he upgraded to the B-side.

Roberto made his first team debut on 30 November 2016, replacing fellow debutant Caio Henrique and scoring the last in a 6–0 away routing of CD Guijuelo, in the season's Copa del Rey. In a test match against Sevilla FC Roberto was employed as a defender. After this rather unsuccessful experiment he performed as a forward again. The following 31 August, he moved abroad after agreeing to a contract with Belgian side Royal Antwerp FC.

On 10 July 2018, after featuring in only two cup matches, Roberto returned to Spain and its third division after agreeing to a deal with UD Las Palmas Atlético. On 20 November 2020, he signed for Águilas FC in the fourth tier.
