= 2015–16 Chelsea F.C. season =

English football club season

Chelsea
2015–16 season
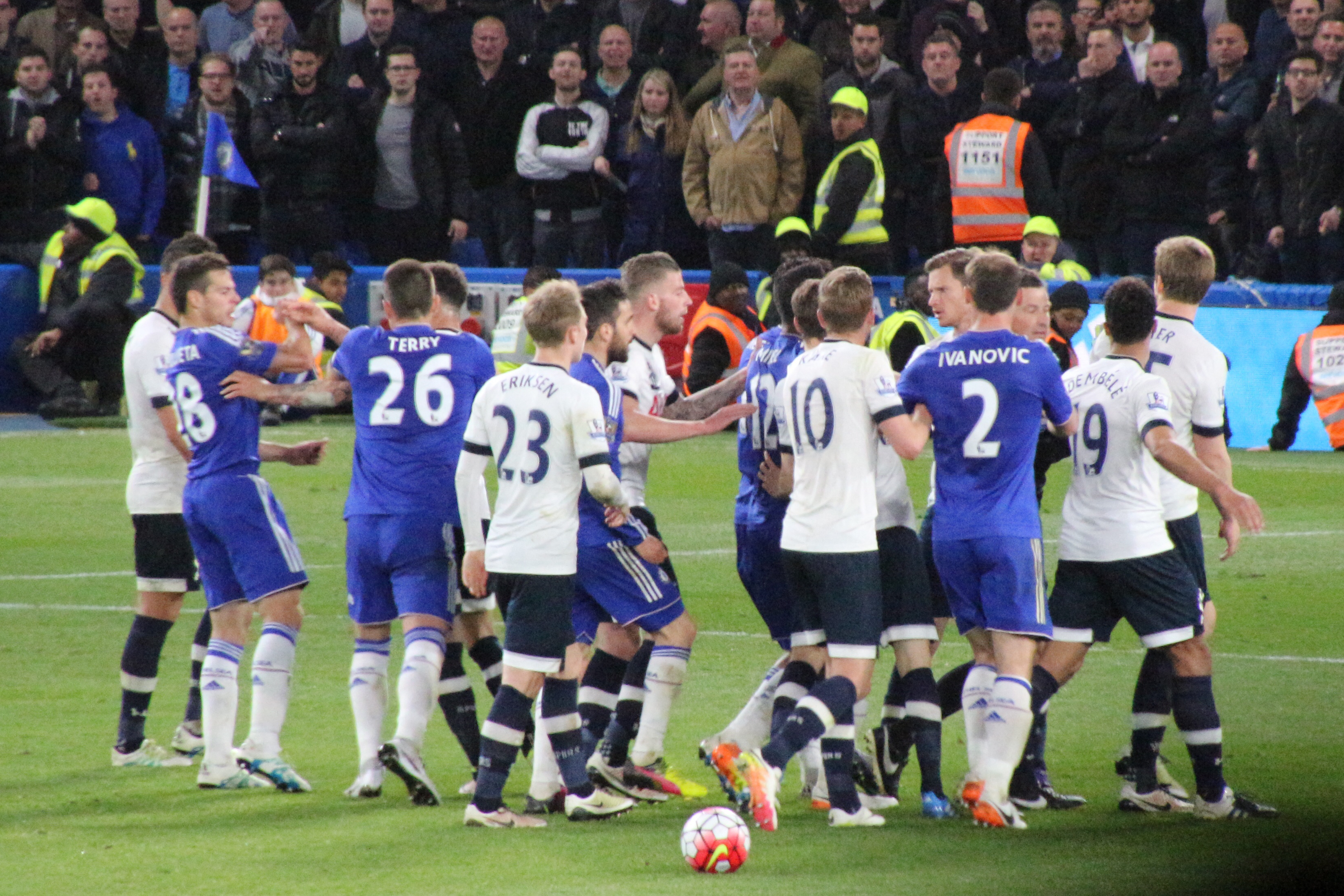
- Scuffling between players in the match between Chelsea and Spurs on 2 May 2016. That match is popularly known as Battle of Stamford Bridge.
- Owner: Roman Abramovich
- Chairman: Bruce Buck
- Manager: José Mourinho (until 17 December); Guus Hiddink (interim; from 19 December)
- Stadium: Stamford Bridge
- Premier League: 10th
- FA Cup: Sixth round
- League Cup: Fourth round
- FA Community Shield: Runners-up
- UEFA Champions League: Round of 16
- Top goalscorer: League: Diego Costa (12); All: Diego Costa (16)
- Highest home attendance: 41,642 vs Southampton (3 October 2015)
- Lowest home attendance: 37,591 vs Paris Saint-Germain (9 March 2016)
- Average home league attendance: 41,500
Home colours	Away colours	Third colours

The 2015–16 season was Chelsea Football Club's 102nd competitive season, 27th consecutive season in the top flight of English football, 24th consecutive season in the Premier League and 110th year in existence as a football club. They entered the season as reigning Premier League champions after winning the title for a fifth time in 2014–15, and also participated in the FA Cup, League Cup, FA Community Shield and UEFA Champions League.

The season was the first since 2003–04 without Petr Čech, who joined rivals Arsenal.

== Kits ==
Supplier: adidas/ Sponsor: Yokohama Tyres.

Home	Home alt.	Home 2016-17	Away	Away alt.	Third	Third alt.

Goalkeeper 1	Goalkeeper 2	Goalkeeper 3	Goalkeeper 2016-17

Starting with this season, the Yokohama Rubber Company replaced Samsung Electronics as Chelsea's shirt sponsor.

== Month-by-month review ==
=== June ===
Left winger Gaël Kakuta left the Blues to join La Liga side Sevilla, for a fee of £2.5 million.

Czech goalkeeper Petr Čech left the club to join London rivals Arsenal on a three-year deal. He played 486 games for the Blues in all competitions, winning four Premier League titles, four FA Cups, three League Cups, two Community Shields, one UEFA Champions League and one UEFA Europa League.

=== July ===
On 3 July, the Blues announced the signing of Radamel Falcao on a season-long loan deal from Monaco.

Young central midfielders Josh McEachran and Marco van Ginkel left the Blues. McEachran joined Championship club Brentford on a four-year deal for a reported £750,000, while Van Ginkel joined Stoke City on a year-long loan deal. Under-21 player Andreas Christensen also left on a season-long loan, joining Borussia Mönchengladbach, while Nathan and Isaiah Brown were loaned to Eredivisie club Vitesse Arnhem.

On 13 July, the Blues completed the signing of Bosnian goalkeeper Asmir Begović from Stoke City on a four-year deal for a reported £8 million. Patrick Bamford extended his contract for another three years and was loaned to Premier League outfit Crystal Palace.

José Mourinho also confirmed that Bertrand Traoré would be a part of his first-team plans for 2015–16, as would Victor Moses. On 28 July, left-back Filipe Luís left the Blues after just one year, moving back to former club Atlético Madrid for a reported £11.1 million.

=== August ===
Chelsea lost the 2015 FA Community Shield 1–0 to Arsenal thanks to an Alex Oxlade-Chamberlain goal in the 24th minute. Diego Costa missed the game through injury, and it was the first time Arsène Wenger defeated José Mourinho in 14 attempts.

On 3 August, Todd Kane signed a new three-year deal at the club, keeping him at the Blues until 2018. Young England forward Dominic Solanke joined fellow Blues players Izzy Brown, Lewis Baker, Nathan and Danilo Pantić on loan at Dutch Eredivisie team Vitesse Arnhem on a season long loan.

On 5 August, Chelsea lost 1–0 to Fiorentina.

Mohamed Salah joined Roma on a season-long loan and Todd Kane joined NEC Nijmegen. On 7 August, manager José Mourinho has signed a new four-year contract, keeping him at Stamford Bridge until at least 2019. Young centre-back Alex Davey joins Peterborough United on a one-month loan deal.

Chelsea started their Premier League campaign at home against Swansea City. Swansea came from behind twice to draw 2–2 with ten-man Chelsea. Oscar gave the Blues the lead before André Ayew drew Swansea level, yet Chelsea went in 2–1 up at the break thanks to a Federico Fernández own goal. Six minutes into the second half, Thibaut Courtois was sent off for a last-man foul on Bafétimbi Gomis; Gomis converted the resulting penalty to equalise for the Swans. This match involved an incident in which Eva Carneiro, the Chelsea team doctor, came on to treat Eden Hazard – an action for which she was later criticised by José Mourinho. Carneiro would later take the club to court and eventually won a £5 million settlement. This event, however, signalled the beginning of a downward spiral that would culminate in José Mourinho's sacking.

Oriol Romeu joined Southampton after four years as a Chelsea player in which he made 33 appearances, scoring once from the penalty spot against Wolverhampton Wanderers in 2012.

Nathan Aké signed a new five-year contract with Chelsea and will continue his development by spending this season on loan in the Premier League at Watford.

Manchester City hammered the Blues 3–0 at the City of Manchester Stadium, goals from Sergio Agüero, Vincent Kompany and Fernandinho condemning José Mourinho to his joint-heaviest defeat whilst in charge of Chelsea. Despite only being the second game of the season, Manchester City move five points ahead of the Blues. Directly after the game, German Bundesliga club FC Augsburg announce that Baba Rahman has signed for Chelsea for a reported fee of £21.7 million.

The Blues announce the signing of Barcelona winger Pedro for a reported £21.4 million, signing a four-year deal with Chelsea. Pedro has won the World Cup, European Championship, three UEFA Champions Leagues and numerous titles in Spain with Barça. Pedro will wear the number 17 shirt, which was given to him by Baba Rahman, the latter vacating it to number 6. The number 17 was previously worn by Eden Hazard and Mohamed Salah.

On 23 August, the Blues announced the signing of Kenedy from Fluminense, who will wear the number 16 shirt. Pedro stars on his Chelsea debut as he scores one and assists another as the Blues win their first game of the season against West Bromwich Albion. Thibaut Courtois saved a first half James Morrison penalty before goals from Pedro, Diego Costa and César Azpilicueta sent Chelsea in 3–1 up at the break. Despite having John Terry sent off in the 54th minute, Chelsea held on to claim all three points.

Chelsea are drawn away against Walsall in the Third round Capital One Cup. While Juan Cuadrado signs on a year-long loan deal for Italian Serie A club Juventus.

In José Mourinho's 200th Premier League match (and 100th league match at home), Chelsea lost 2–1 to Crystal Palace at Stamford Bridge. This marked only the second time Mourinho had suffered a home defeat in the league as Chelsea manager, and it was also just his third home defeat in all competitions while in charge of Chelsea. Goals from Bakary Sako and Joel Ward either side of Radamel Falcao's first goal for the Blues sent Chelsea eight points behind leaders Manchester City.

Position at the end of August
Pos	Team	Pld	W	D	L	GF	GA	GD	Pts
11	Bournemouth	4	1	1	2	5	6	−1	4
12	Aston Villa	4	1	1	2	4	5	−1	4
13	Chelsea	4	1	1	2	6	9	−3	4
14	Norwich City	4	1	1	2	5	8	−3	4
15	West Bromwich Albion	4	1	1	2	3	6	−3	4

=== September ===
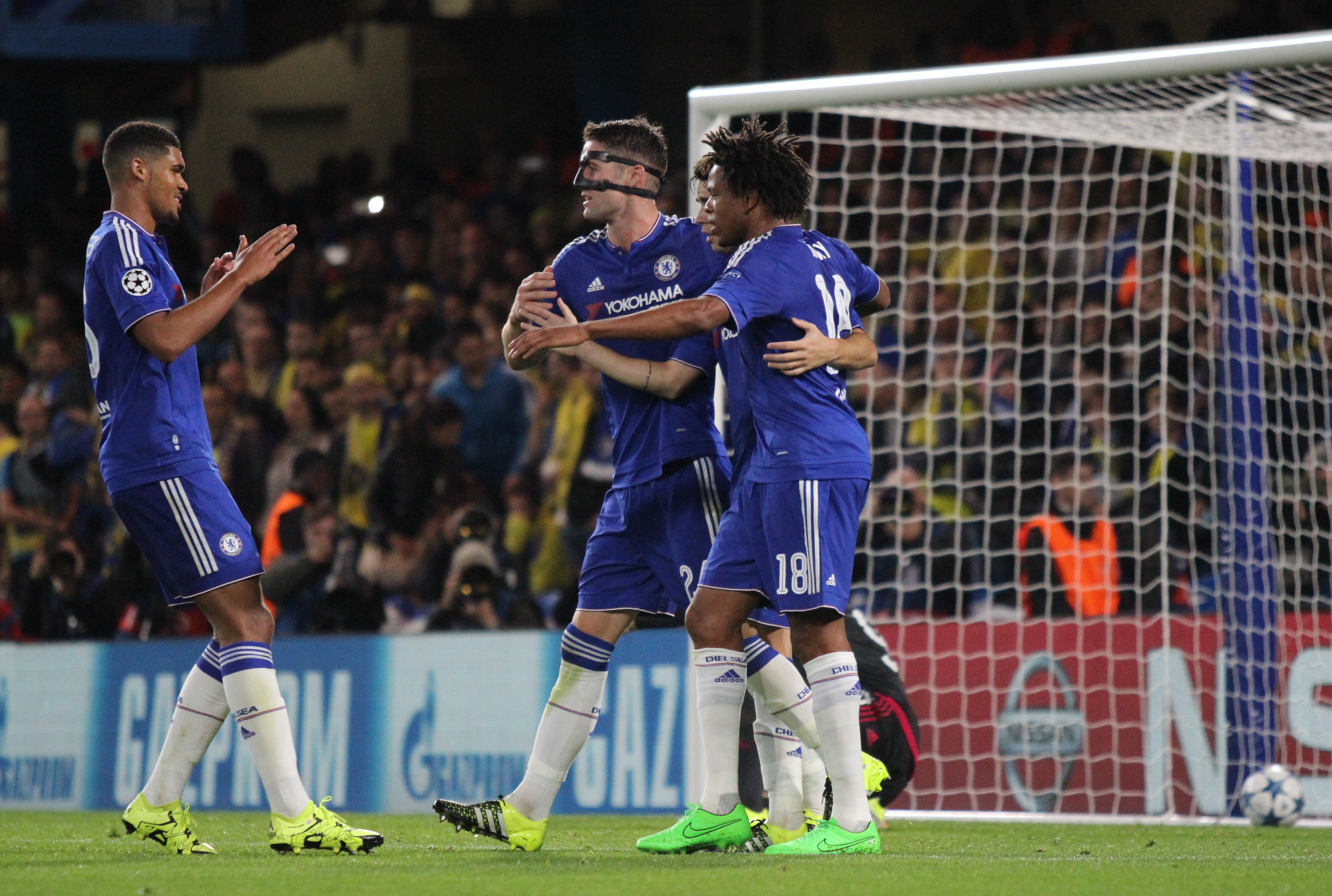
Chelsea players celebrate their goal against Maccabi Tel Aviv.

On transfer deadline day, Chelsea announced the signing of Nantes defender Papy Djilobodji for a reported £2.7 million. Victor Moses extended his contract for another four years and was loaned to West Ham United. The Blues also signed Michael Hector for a reported £4 million from Reading; he was immediately loaned back to Reading for the entirety of the season.

First choice goalkeeper Thibaut Courtois was ruled out for up to three months with a knee injury. The Blues' poor form continued as they suffered another defeat, this time away at Everton. A Steven Naismith hat-trick condemned Chelsea to a third defeat after just five games, as many as they suffered in the entire previous season.

Chelsea won their first home game of the season as they defeated Maccabi Tel Aviv 4–0. Goals from Willian, Oscar, Diego Costa and Cesc Fàbregas sent the Blues top of Group G after one game. This victory was Chelsea's first clean sheet since the Blues won the title last May 1–0 against Crystal Palace.

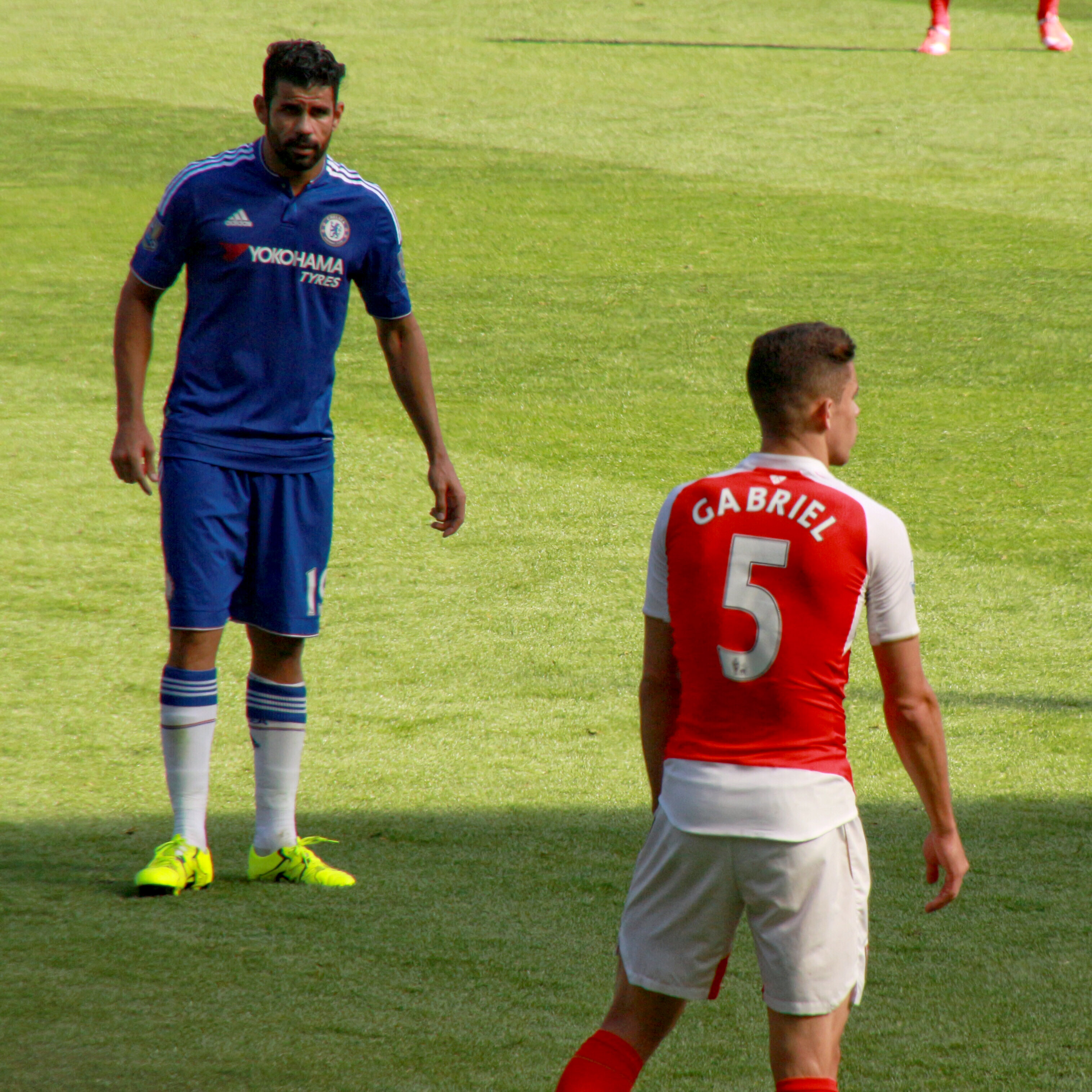
Diego Costa eyeballs Arsenal's Gabriel. The latter would be the recipient of a red card later rescinded, while the former was charged with violent conduct.

Goals from Kurt Zouma and a Calum Chambers own goal gave Chelsea a 2–0 victory over nine-man Arsenal. Gabriel and Santi Cazorla were sent off for the Gunners, the former for kicking out at Diego Costa and the latter for receiving two yellow cards. The Blues also kept their first clean sheet of the 2015–16 Premier League season. Zouma's goal was his first in the Premier League for Chelsea. Two days after the game, both Chelsea and Arsenal were charged with failing to control their players. Costa was charged with an act of violent conduct for the incident that started the disturbance, in which he slapped Laurent Koscielny in the face, which was not seen by the match officials but was caught on video. Costa was given a three-match suspension. Gabriel had his three-match suspension withdrawn after a "wrongful dismissal claim" from Arsenal and was available for their next match.

Chelsea came from 2–0 down with ten minutes to play to secure a point away to Newcastle United thanks to late goals from substitutes Ramires and Willian. Ayoze Pérez and Georginio Wijnaldum sent the Magpies ahead before the Brazilian substitutes sent the Blues five points off the top four.

The Blues' last game in September finished in a 2–1 loss at Porto in a hard-fought game. Chelsea failed to claim a draw as goals from André André and Maicon sent Porto one point ahead of Chelsea.

Position at the end of September
Pos	Team	Pld	W	D	L	GF	GA	GD	Pts
12	Norwich City	7	2	3	2	11	12	−1	9
13	Watford	7	2	3	2	5	6	−1	9
14	Chelsea	7	2	2	3	11	14	−3	8
15	West Bromwich Albion	7	2	2	3	6	9	−3	8
16	Bournemouth	7	2	1	4	9	11	−2	7

=== October ===
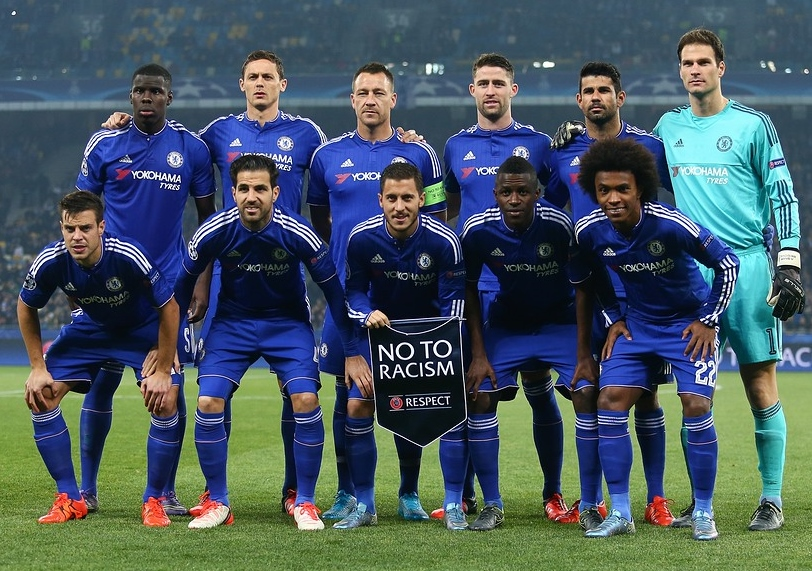
Chelsea's starting eleven against Dynamo Kyiv in the UEFA Champions League.

Chelsea's poor start to the season continued as Southampton came from behind to record a victory at Stamford Bridge. The Blues had taken only eight points from a possible 24 this season and were only four above the relegation zone. After Saturday's home defeat, Chelsea offered their full support to manager José Mourinho. Meanwhile, Blues captain John Terry said the 52-year-old Portuguese was the best person to help the club recover from their miserable start. "If anyone is going to get us out of this hole it is going to be José Mourinho", said the 34-year-old defender.

The Blues defeated Aston Villa 2–0 at Stamford Bridge, with a Diego Costa goal and an Alan Hutton own goal. José Mourinho dropped Eden Hazard, Nemanja Matić and Gary Cahill and chose to start youngsters Ruben Loftus-Cheek and Baba Rahman. Four days later, Chelsea drew 0–0 with Ukrainian side Dynamo Kyiv, keeping them in third place one point behind the Ukrainian champions.

José Mourinho and Nemanja Matić were sent off as Chelsea's miserable Premier League campaign continued with a 2–1 defeat at West Ham on 24 October. Mauro Zárate fired the Hammers in front when Chelsea failed to clear a corner. Matić was sent off after being booked twice in nine minutes before the break, and Mourinho joined him after speaking to referee Jon Moss at halftime. Gary Cahill levelled from a corner but Andy Carroll met Aaron Cresswell's cross to send the Hammers to second in the table.

Chelsea crashed out of the League Cup in the fourth round after Jack Butland's penalty shootout heroics earned ten-man Stoke City a 5–4 spot-kick win that increased the pressure on José Mourinho. Jonathan Walters struck a goal worthy of winning any contest to give Stoke the lead early in the second half, before Loïc Rémy's injury-time equaliser took the tie the distance at the Britannia Stadium. After nine out of the first nine spot-kicks were clinically despatched—with the likes of Charlie Adam, Marko Arnautović, Oscar, Rémy and Willian successful—Eden Hazard saw his attempt brilliantly saved by Jack Butland, who earned his side a place in the last eight.

Philippe Coutinho scored twice as Liverpool came from behind to beat Chelsea 3–1 at Stamford Bridge on 31 October to ratchet up the pressure yet further on the beleaguered Mourinho. A Ramires header gave the Premier League champions the lead after just four minutes, but compatriot Coutinho fired Liverpool level in some style just before half-time. Oscar came close with a long-range chip, but chances were few and far between in the second half until another Coutinho effort clipped John Terry and flew past Asmir Begović. Christian Benteke made sure of the points with a composed finish in the closing minutes as Jürgen Klopp secured his first league win since taking charge of Liverpool.

Position at the end of October
Pos	Team	Pld	W	D	L	GF	GA	GD	Pts
13	Swansea City	11	3	4	4	12	15	−3	13
14	Stoke City	11	3	4	4	9	12	−3	13
15	Chelsea	11	3	2	6	16	22	−6	11
16	Norwich City	11	2	3	6	15	23	−8	9
17	Bournemouth	10	2	2	6	12	22	−10	8

=== November ===
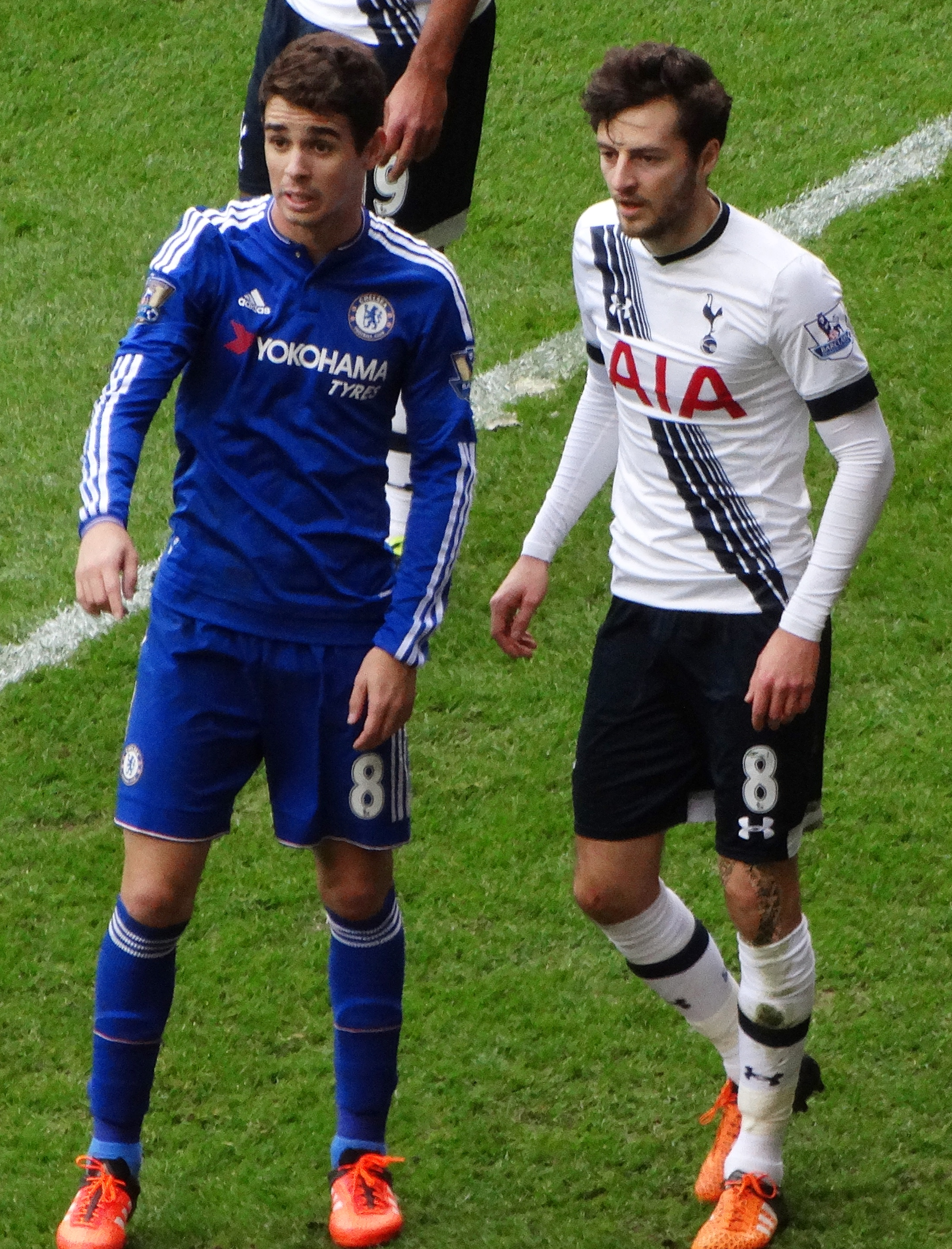
Oscar with opposite number Ryan Mason in the London derby between Chelsea and Tottenham Hotspur

Chelsea eased the pressure on manager José Mourinho as Willian's late winner gave them a crucial Champions League victory over Dynamo Kyiv at Stamford Bridge. The win moved the Blues into second place in Group G, three points behind leaders Porto, but now with a two-point cushion to Dynamo.

Premier League-wise, though, Chelsea continued their struggle as they lost in a 1–0 away game at Stoke City. Seeing Norwich City win, this left them 16th in the League and three points above relegation.

Chelsea recorded their first win in four Premier League matches as Diego Costa's first goal in seven games gave them a narrow victory over Norwich. The Blues finally broke through when Costa finished off Cesc Fàbregas' quickly taken free-kick. The home side were denied a second when Kurt Zouma's flick hit the crossbar.

The Blues also secured back-to-back wins, after defeating Maccabi Tel Aviv 4–0. Goals from Gary Cahill, Willian, Oscar and Kurt Zouma sent Chelsea closer to the knockout phase, needing only one point home against Porto.

Tottenham Hotspur extended their unbeaten run in the Premier League to a club record 13 games with a 0–0 draw against Chelsea at White Hart Lane. Neither goalkeeper was to beaten before the final whistle, leaving Mourinho's side 14th in the table with one win in their last five Premier League matches.

Position at the end of November
Pos	Team	Pld	W	D	L	GF	GA	GD	Pts
12	Stoke City	14	5	4	5	11	14	−3	19
13	West Bromwich Albion	14	5	3	6	13	18	−5	18
14	Chelsea	14	4	3	7	17	23	−6	15
15	Swansea City	14	3	5	6	14	19	−5	14
16	Norwich City	14	3	4	7	17	25	−8	13

=== December ===
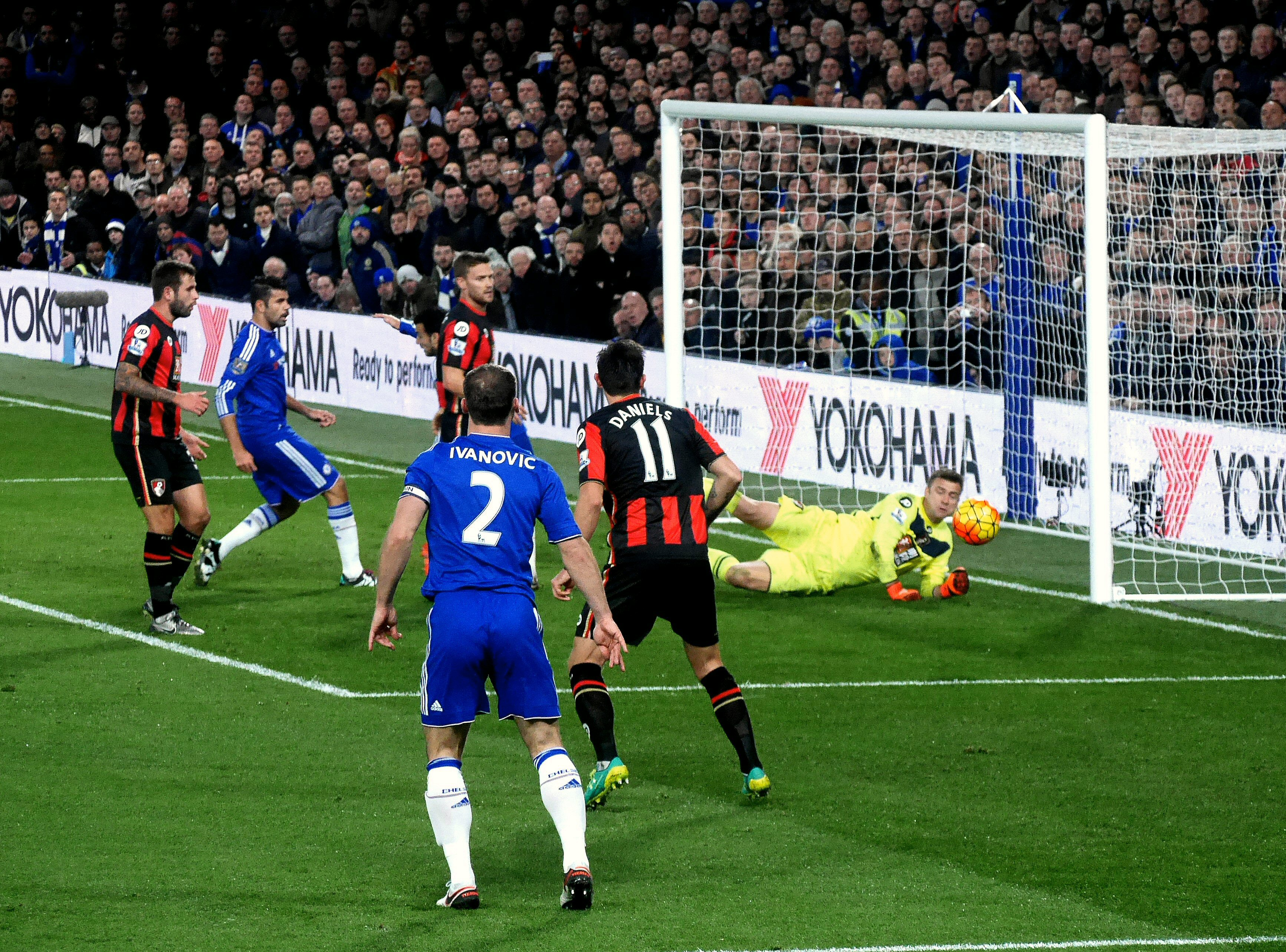
The away goalmouth in Chelsea's home defeat to AFC Bournemouth

Glenn Murray scored a dramatic late winning goal as AFC Bournemouth recorded one of the most famous wins in their history against Chelsea at Stamford Bridge. The substitute had been on the pitch for just 99 seconds before he bundled home the winner. Mourinho's side, who sat 14th in the table, had now suffered eight defeats in 15 league games and Eden Hazard's goalless streak stretching to 25 games in all competitions.

Chelsea advanced to the Champions League knockout stage with a 2–0 victory, which eliminated opponents Porto and sent the Portuguese side into the Europa League. Costa, on the bench in the Blues' last two games, had a hand in the opening goal when his saved effort rebounded in off Iván Marcano and Willian scored the second goal.

The Blues lost their ninth Premier League game (out of sixteen) of the season, while Leicester City moved to the top of the Premier League, in a 2–1 loss on Monday. This left the defending champions just one point clear of the relegation. Jamie Vardy scored for the sixth consecutive Premier League home match and Riyad Mahrez scored the second goal before Loïc Rémy could halve the deficit with 13 minutes remaining.

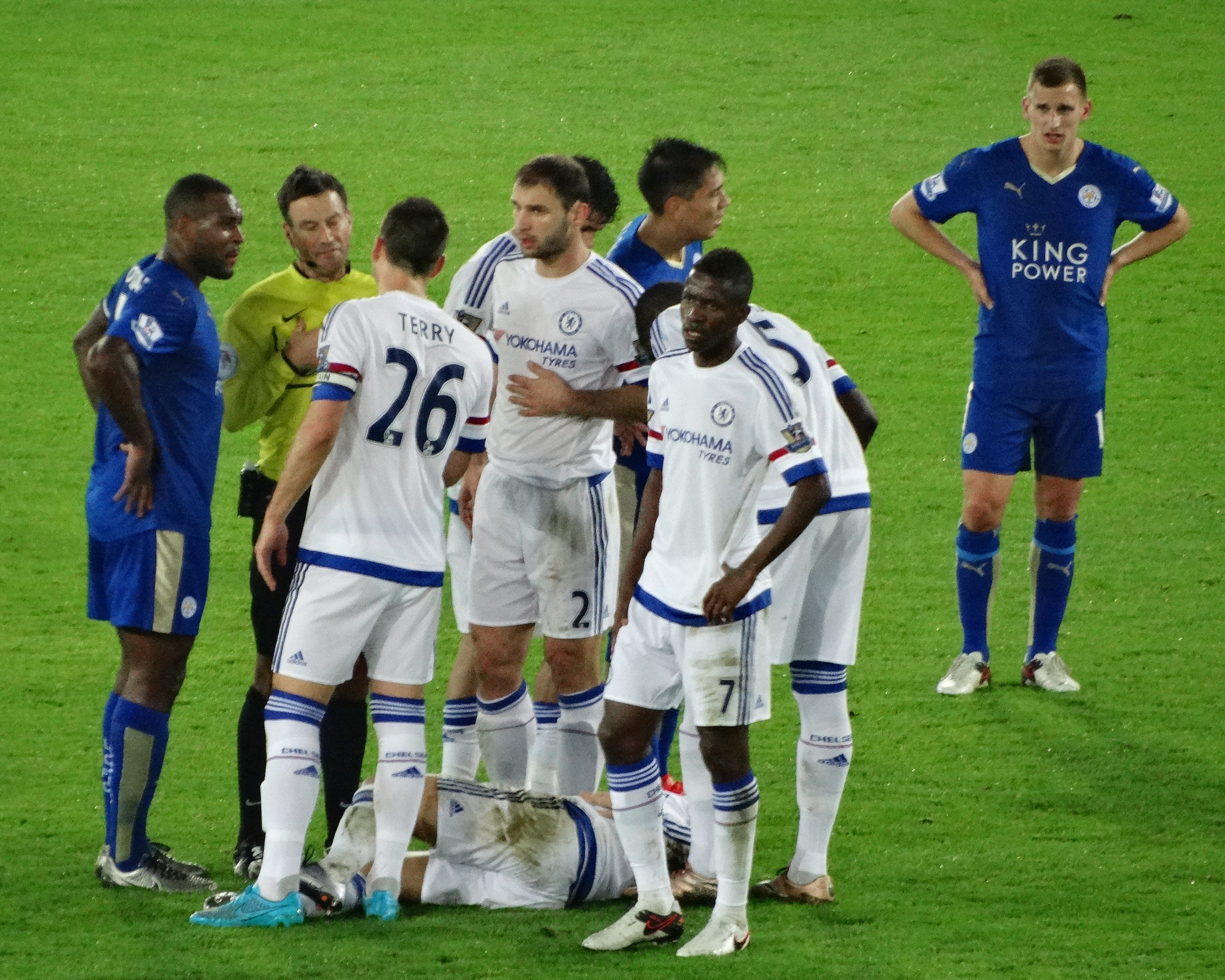
Chelsea players in conversation with the referee during their defeat to Leicester City

On 17 December, after the loss against Leicester City and after losing nine out of sixteen league games, manager José Mourinho was sacked by Chelsea. Former Netherlands boss Guus Hiddink was appointed interim Chelsea manager until the end of the season following the sacking of Mourinho. The Dutchman was to be at Stamford Bridge for Sunderland's match, but Steve Holland took control of team matters for the game alongside Eddie Newton, who now took on the role of assistant first-team coach.

Chelsea began their second post-José Mourinho era by scoring three goals in the Premier League for the first time in nearly four months to beat Sunderland. Fabio Borini pulled one back for Sunderland when he bundled in from close range, but that was not enough to take it to a comeback. The day was marked by fan protests and shows of support for Mourinho.

On Boxing Day, Diego Costa scored twice as Guus Hiddink's second spell as Chelsea boss started with a 2–2 draw against Watford.

On 28 December, keepers David de Gea and Thibaut Courtois were the stars of the show as Manchester United and Chelsea drew 0–0.

Position at the end of December
Pos	Team	Pld	W	D	L	GF	GA	GD	Pts
12	Southampton	19	6	6	7	25	22	+3	24
13	West Bromwich Albion	19	6	5	8	18	24	−6	23
14	Chelsea	19	5	5	9	23	29	−6	20
15	Norwich City	19	5	5	9	22	32	−10	20
16	Bournemouth	19	5	5	9	22	34	−12	20

=== January ===
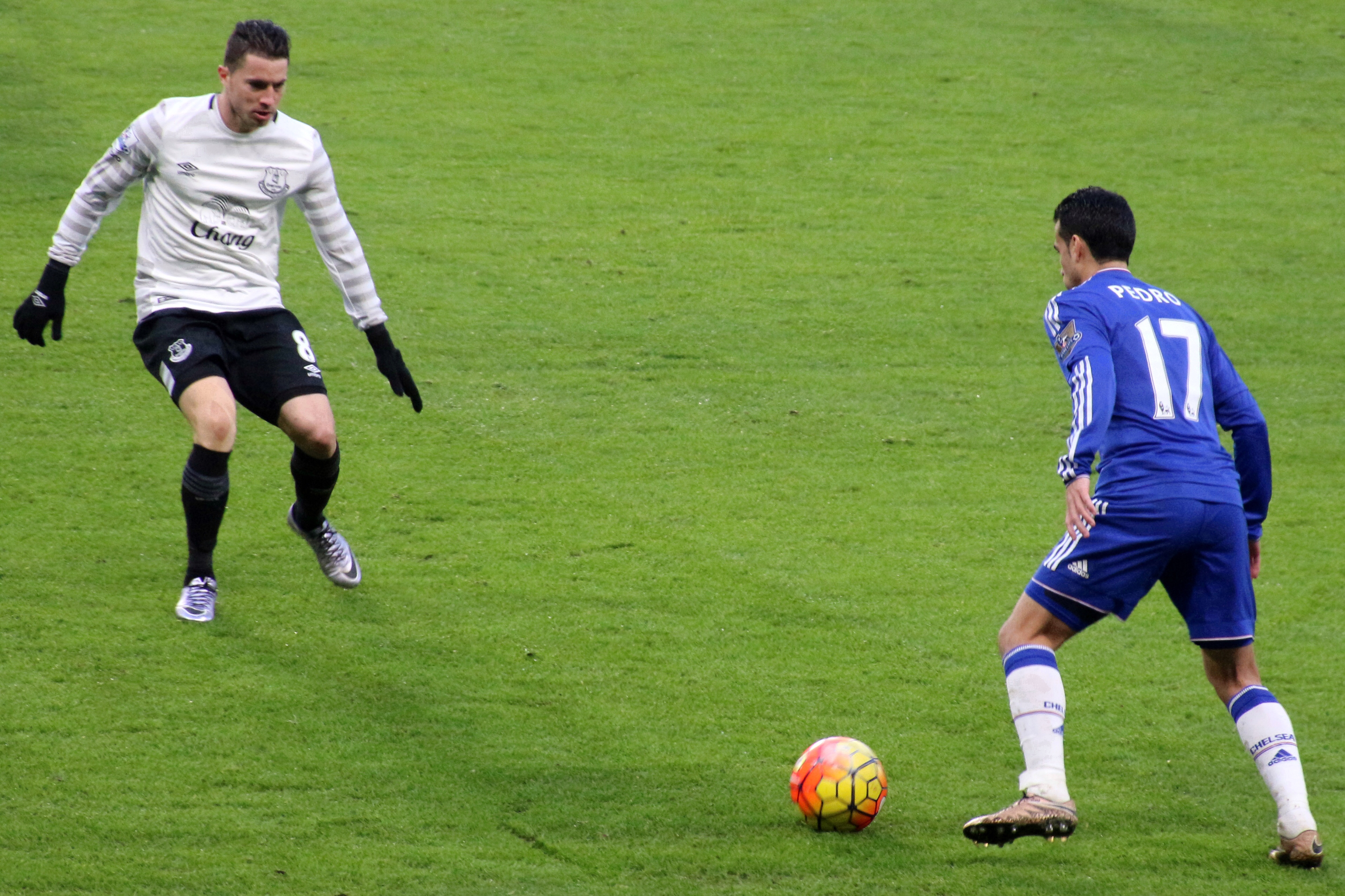
Bryan Oviedo jockeys Pedro in the 3–3 draw against Everton.

Chelsea secured their first victory in Hiddink's second spell as boss to move six points clear of relegation with a win at Crystal Palace. A first-half goal from Oscar gave the Blues the lead at Selhurst Park, before second-half strikes from Willian and Diego Costa secured all three points.

John Swift extended his loan with Championship club Brentford until the end of the season. Additionally, both Patrick Bamford and Christian Atsu returned to the club following their loan spells with Crystal Palace and Bournemouth respectively.

On 10 January, Chelsea advanced to the fourth round of the FA Cup, defeating Football League One side Scunthorpe United 2–0. Ruben Loftus-Cheek scored the second goal, the first of his senior career at Chelsea.

On 24 January, Chelsea earned a 1–0 victory over Arsenal after a first-half goal from Diego Costa. With this win, Chelsea moved past West Bromwich Albion into 13th in the league over goal difference with 28 points.

On 31 January, Chelsea rounded out the month with a 5–1 victory over Championship side MK Dons in the fourth round of the FA Cup. The Blues will host Manchester City in the fifth round on 21 February.

Position at the end of January
Pos	Team	Pld	W	D	L	GF	GA	GD	Pts
11	Crystal Palace	23	9	4	10	24	27	−3	31
12	Everton	23	6	11	6	40	34	+6	29
13	Chelsea	23	7	7	9	32	34	−2	28
14	West Bromwich Albion	23	7	7	9	22	30	−8	28
15	Swansea City	23	6	7	10	22	31	−9	25

=== February ===
Chelsea began the month with back-to-back draws against league opponents Watford and Manchester United, 0–0 and 1–1, respectively. The draw against Manchester United was marred by a serious knee injury to Kurt Zouma, which would rule him out until the following season.

Chelsea returned to their winning ways on 13 February, dominating Newcastle United 5–1 at Stamford Bridge. Chelsea led 2–0 within ten minutes thanks to goals from Diego Costa and Pedro. Costa later set up Willian, who finished to make the lead three goals at the 17 minute mark. In the second half, Pedro added a second goal, and Bertrand Traoré scored his first league goal to make it 5–0. The Magpies got a 90th-minute goal through Andros Townsend, but it was little consolation as the rout ended in favor of the Blues. The only other blemish of the game was a hamstring injury to club captain John Terry, who missed the next match.

Chelsea then faced Paris Saint-Germain in the first leg of the UEFA Champions League round of 16. Chelsea were without John Terry and Kurt Zouma, due to injuries, and Nemanja Matić, as he had been suspended for accumulating two yellow cards. Because of this, Chelsea started Gary Cahill and Branislav Ivanović at centre back, and Baba Rahman and César Azpilicueta at full-back. The Parisians dominated possession throughout much of the half and eventually capitalized in the 39th minute. Chelsea midfielder John Obi Mikel conceded a foul just outside the 18-yard box. PSG forward Zlatan Ibrahimović's free kick deflected off Mikel, who was part of the wall, and past goalkeeper Thibaut Courtois. Just a few minutes later, however, Chelsea equalised through Mikel from a stoppage time corner kick. PSG regained their lead late in the game as Edinson Cavani, who had only entered the match moments prior as a substitute, broke through the Chelsea back line and beat Courtois. The lead would hold, with PSG holding a 2–1 lead heading into the second leg.

Five days after the loss in Paris, Chelsea bounced back with a 5–1 win against Manchester City in the fifth round of the FA Cup. City manager Manuel Pellegrini chose to play a weakened squad that featured five youth players making their senior debuts. Chelsea struck first, Diego Costa scoring on a 35th-minute header. However, City immediately responded, with David Faupala scoring on his senior debut and tying the score going to halftime. However, Faupala's goal was the last glimmer of hope, as Chelsea would score four times in the second half. Four different Chelsea players scored in the second half: Willian, Gary Cahill, Eden Hazard, and Bertrand Traoré. The final score was 5–1. Later that day, Chelsea drew Everton as their opponent in the sixth round, to be played on 12 March.

Position at the end of February
Pos	Team	Pld	W	D	L	GF	GA	GD	Pts
9	Liverpool	26	10	8	8	30	28	+2	38
10	Watford	27	10	7	10	29	28	+1	37
11	Chelsea	27	9	9	9	40	37	+3	36
12	Everton	26	8	11	7	46	35	+11	35
13	West Bromwich Albion	27	9	8	10	27	34	−7	35

=== March ===
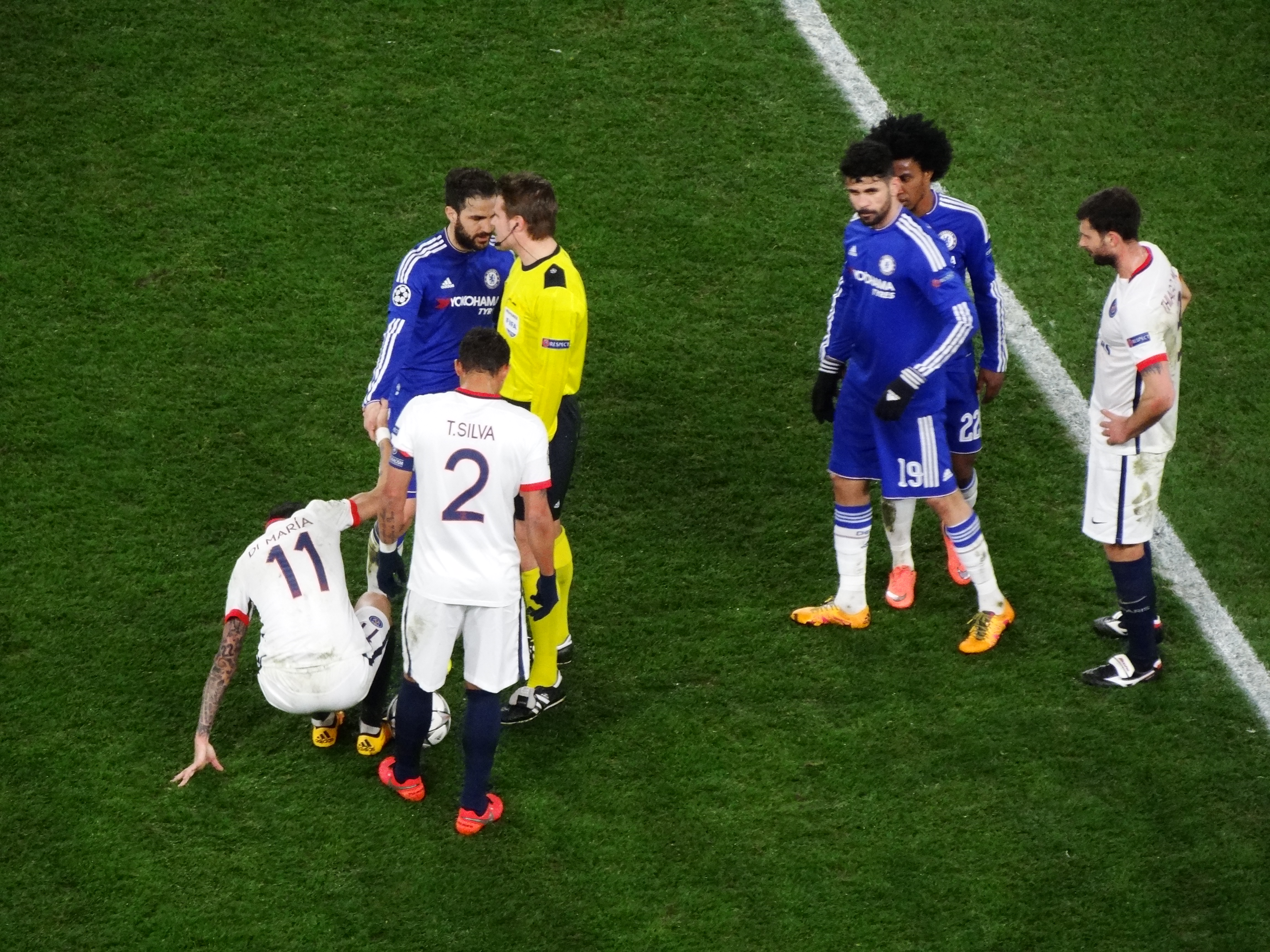
Cesc Fàbregas helps Paris SG's Ángel Di María to his feet as Chelsea exit the UEFA Champions League.

Chelsea began March with a victory against Norwich City on the first day of the month. Chelsea scored just 39 seconds into the match behind a strike from Kenedy, a natural winger who had lined up as a left back. Having taken the lead in the first minute, Chelsea later doubled it in the final minute of the first half, with Diego Costa scoring in stoppage time. Norwich would cut the Blues' lead to one after a 68th-minute goal from Nathan Redmond. However, Chelsea would manage to hold on to their lead and win. The final score was 2–1.

Four days later, Chelsea faced off with Stoke City. Chelsea scored through Bertrand Traoré in the 39th minute. Chelsea maintained their lead, but Mame Biram Diouf would equalize in the 85th. This score would hold, a 1–1 draw.

On 9 March, Chelsea lost 1–2 (2–4 on aggregate) to PSG in the second leg of the Champions League round of 16. Adrien Rabiot put PSG ahead 16 minutes into the match. Chelsea's Diego Costa equalised 11 minutes later, putting the aggregate score 3–2 in favor of PSG. A second Chelsea goal would have forced extra time, and they looked the better side for the remainder of the second half, but failed to score such a goal on several chances. In the 60th minute, Costa went to ground with an injury and had to be replaced by Bertrand Traoré. Seven minutes later, Zlatan Ibrahimović connected with an Ángel Di María cross. This all but ended any chances of a Chelsea comeback, as, due to the away goals rule, would have needed to score three goals in just over 20 minutes. Chelsea failed to score even one, let alone three, and the score ended 1–2 (2–4 on aggregate) in favor of PSG.

On 12 March, Chelsea lost 2–0 away to Everton in the sixth round of the FA Cup. Former Chelsea's player Romelu Lukaku scored both goals for Everton. As of 12 March, Chelsea were eliminated from all knockout competitions and sat 10th in the league.

On 19 March, Chelsea earned a 2–2 draw with London rivals West Ham United at Stamford Bridge. West Ham United opened the scoring with a fantastic long range shot from Manuel Lanzini which sailed past Thibaut Courtois in the 17th minute. However, just before the half time break Spaniard Cesc Fàbregas equalized with a sublime free-kick. West Ham United re-took the lead in the 61st minute courtesy of substitute Andy Carroll. However, Chelsea replied again this time in the 88th minute after Ruben Loftus-Cheek was brought down by Michail Antonio in the penalty area, therefore earning the Blues a penalty with seconds of normal time remaining. Chelsea then found their second equalizer of the match after Cesc Fàbregas converted the penalty comfortably past goalkeeper Adrián.

Position at the end of March
Pos	Team	Pld	W	D	L	GF	GA	GD	Pts
8	Stoke City	31	13	7	11	34	37	−3	46
9	Liverpool	29	12	8	9	37	32	+5	44
10	Chelsea	30	10	11	9	45	41	+4	41
11	West Bromwich Albion	30	10	9	11	30	37	−7	39
12	Everton	29	9	11	9	51	41	+10	38

=== April ===
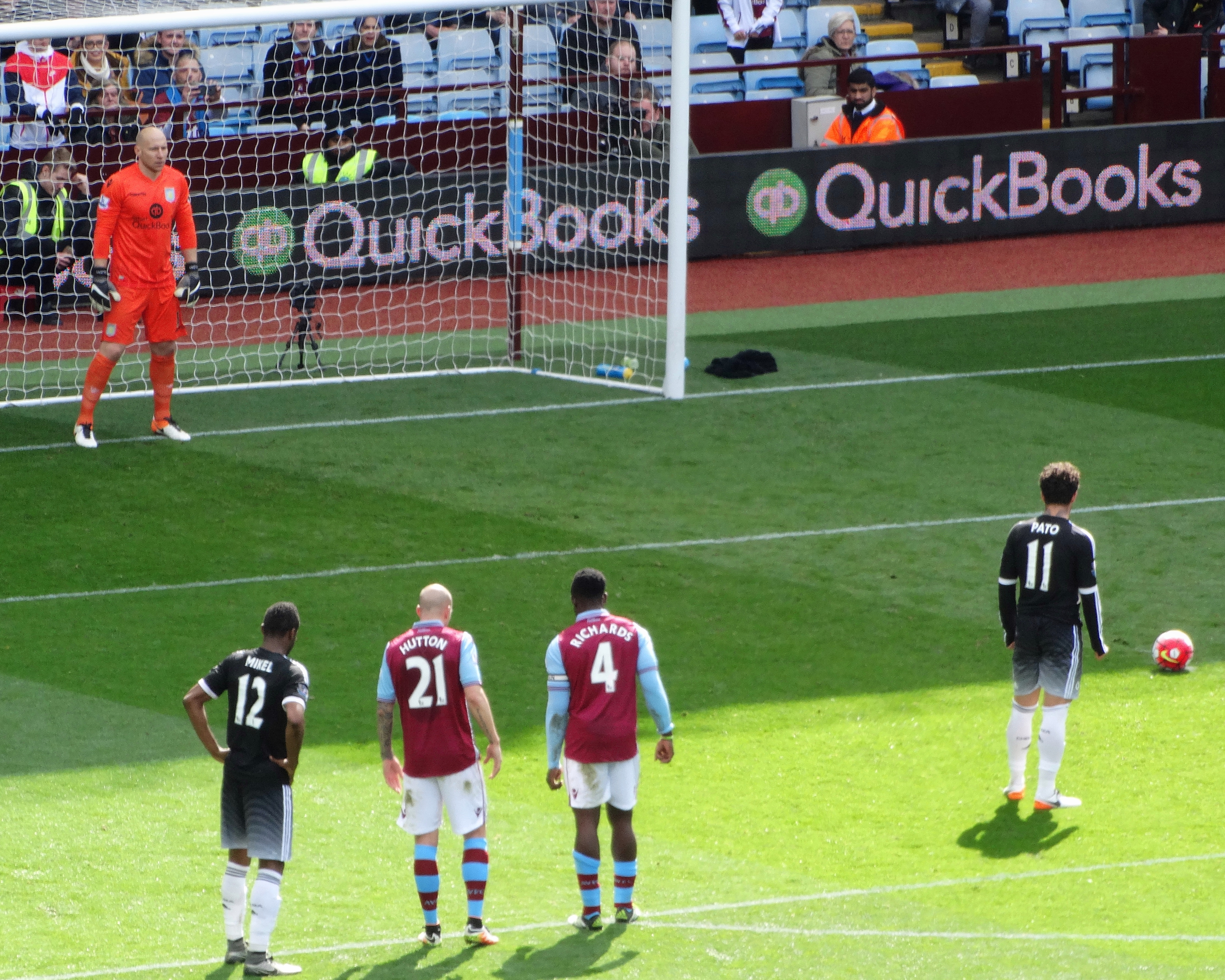
Debutant Alexandre Pato scores Chelsea's second of four at Villa Park from the penalty spot.

Chelsea began the month with a 4–0 away victory at Villa Park, beating a struggling Aston Villa side. Matt Miazga, Alexandre Pato and Jake Clarke-Salter all made their first-team debuts for Chelsea. Chelsea took the lead through Ruben Loftus-Cheek after his shot was deflected by Villa defender Joleon Lescott. The Blues then doubled their advantage through an Alexandre Pato penalty, after he was brought down in the area by Aly Cissokho. Pato had replaced the injured Loïc Rémy in the 23rd minute. Chelsea then scored a third through Pedro a minute into the second half. Pedro scored a second after a Pato shot was parried away by Villa goalkeeper Brad Guzan and found its way to the feet of the Spaniard.

On 4 April, Chelsea announced that Antonio Conte would become the new first team head coach at the start of the 2016–17 campaign.

On 9 April, Chelsea lost 1–0 at Swansea, with the Swans scoring through Gylfi Sigurðsson.

On 16 April, Chelsea lost 3–0 at home to Manchester City, the same scoreline as the previous league meeting between the two sides in August 2015.

On 23 April, Chelsea played away at Bournemouth. Chelsea got on the board early with a goal from Pedro, followed by two Hazard goals and a Willian goal. Hazard scored three goals in the Premier League this season. Fabregas contributed three assists in the win.

Position at the end of April
Pos	Team	Pld	W	D	L	GF	GA	GD	Pts
8	Southampton	35	15	9	11	49	37	+12	54
9	Stoke City	36	13	9	14	38	52	−14	48
10	Chelsea	34	12	11	11	53	46	+7	47
11	Everton	35	10	14	11	55	49	+6	44
12	Watford	35	12	8	15	36	42	−6	44

=== May ===
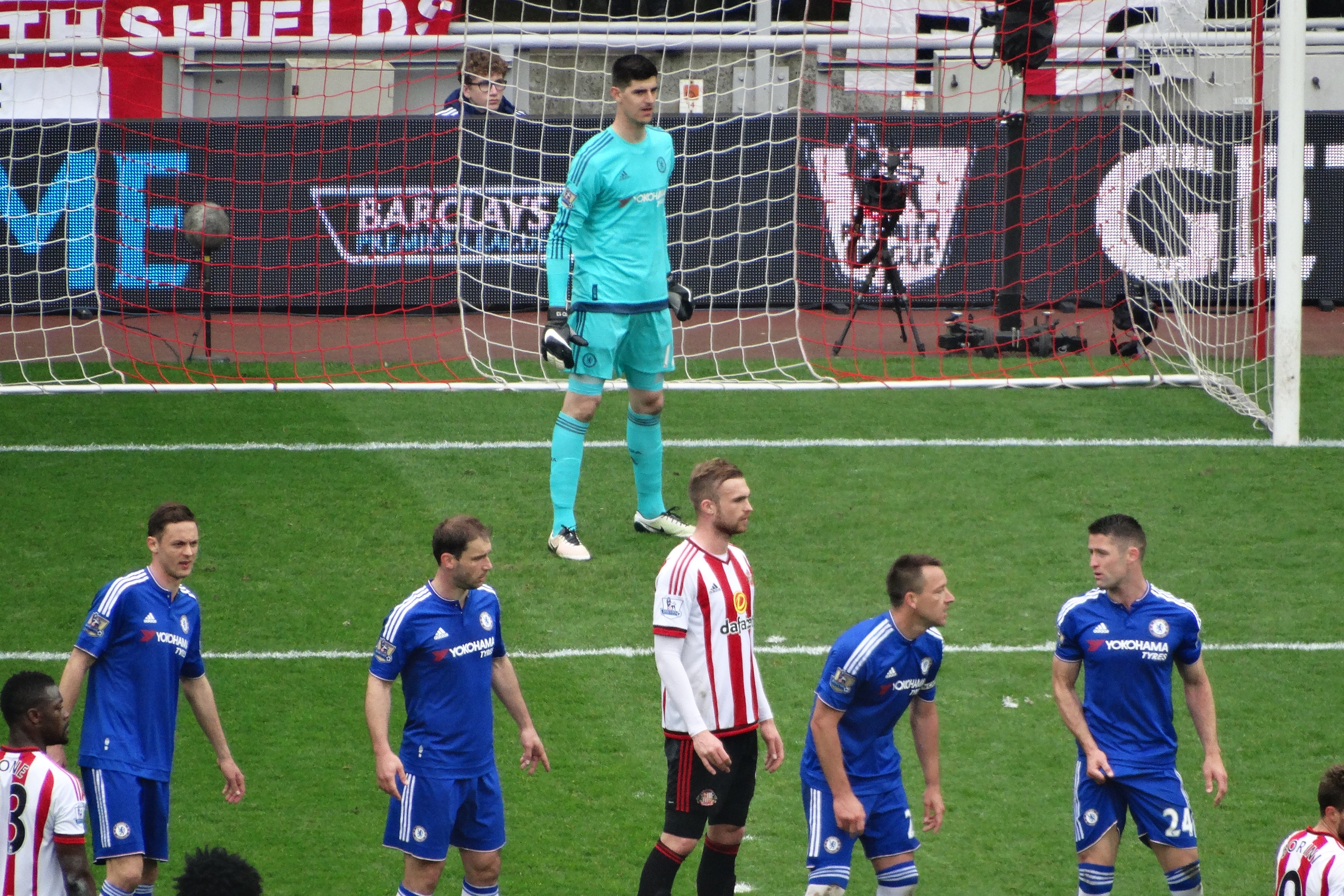
Chelsea's back five, punctuated by Sunderland man Jan Kirchhoff

Chelsea went winless throughout the month of May, managing three draws and a loss. Their first game of the month was against Tottenham Hotspur on 2 May and this match has since become known as the 'Battle of the Bridge'. The game ended in a 2–2 in which Chelsea came back from being 2–0 down at half time, to secure a point against Tottenham and effectively end their London rival's hopes of obtaining the Premier League title, as Tottenham dropping points meant that they were mathematically unable to surpass Leicester at the top of the table. The opening goals for Tottenham came from Kane in the 35th minute and Son Heung-min's low strike in the 44th minute. The match seemed to be decided until Chelsea returned fire in the second half with Cahill lashing in a goal from distance in the 58th minute, and Hazard then scored a goal in the 83rd minute to continue to regain his form after not having scored until April, and to maintain Chelsea's unbeaten streak at home against Tottenham for the 26th year in a row.

Chelsea's next game was a 3–2 away loss to Sunderland on 7 May, which proved to be crucial for the home side's survival in the top flight of English football, at the time moving Sunderland up to 17th in the table and one point clear of their bitter rivals Newcastle United. Chelsea scored the opening goal with a precise finishing strike from Diego Costa in the 14th minute, giving them the lead until Sunderland equalised with a 41st minute volley from Khazri. Chelsea regained the lead seven minutes later in added time with a goal from Nemanja Matić to put them 2–1 up at half time. Sunderland were to turn the game on its head in the second half with two goals in the span of three minutes from Fabio Borini and Jermain Defoe, scored in the 67th and 70th minute. Chelsea were unable to fight back for a draw as Sunderland held on for the three points which would boost their survival hopes. Chelsea remained 9th in the table following the result, possessing a better goal difference than Stoke City in 10th position.

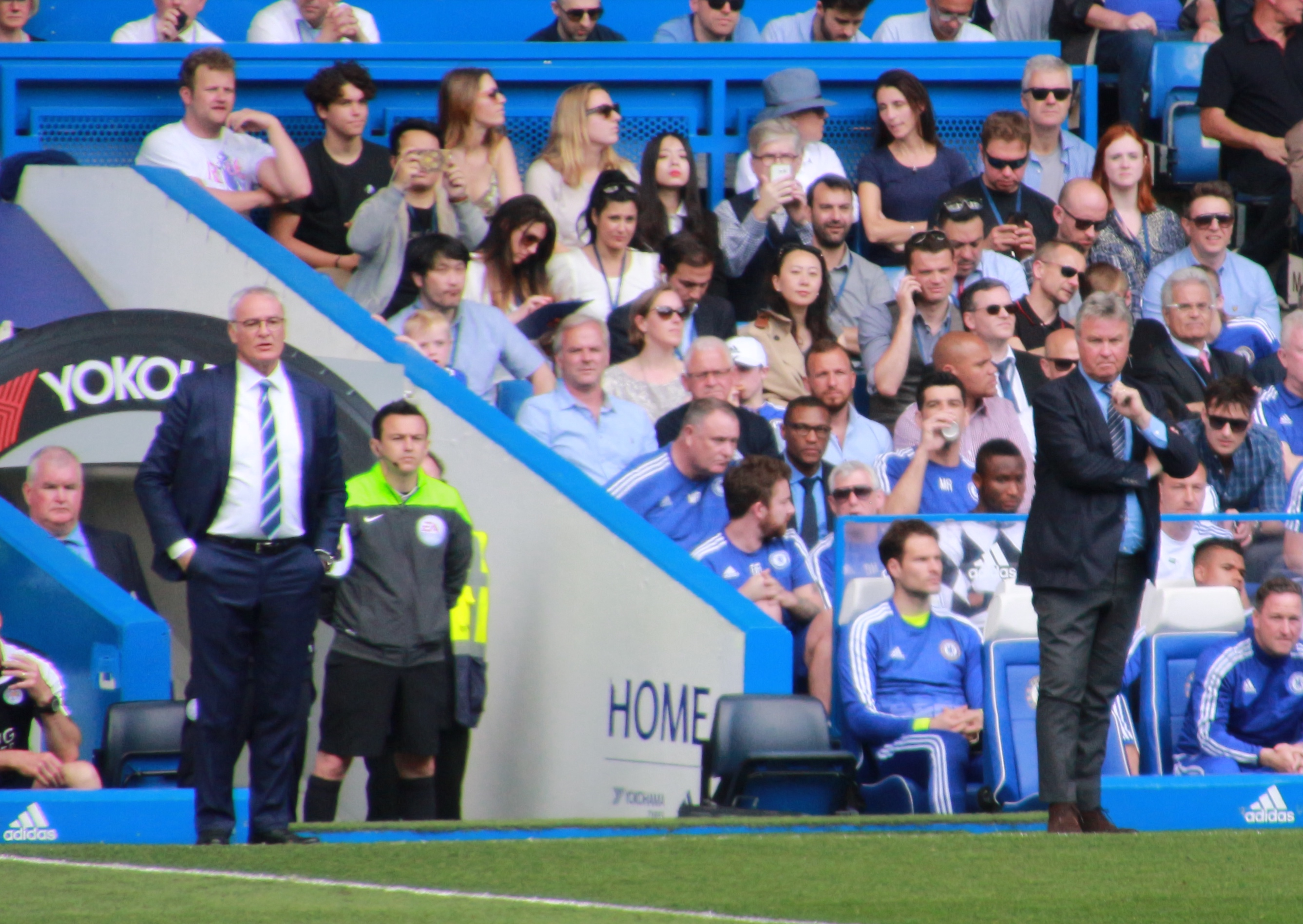
Former Chelsea manager Claudio Ranieri–now with newly crowned champions Leicester–in Guus Hiddink's last match as Blues boss

Chelsea's penultimate game of the season and their last away fixture was a 1–1 draw with Liverpool at Anfield, on 11 May. After a slow start, Eden Hazard found the net again, continuing an improved run of form with a 32nd minute solo goal to put the Blues in front. The game remained uneventful until Christian Benteke equalised for Liverpool, with a header in the 2nd minute of added time during the second half, claiming a point for the Merseyside club and increasing the team's unbeaten home streak to 12 games.

Chelsea's final game of the 2015–16 Premier League season on 15 May resulted in another 1–1 draw, this time at home to champions Leicester City whom they had failed to defend their title against from the previous season. The game remained goalless until the 66th minute with Cesc Fàbregas scoring a penalty. Leicester responded quickly with a goal from Danny Drinkwater fourteen minutes later, to conclude the campaign with Chelsea finishing 10th due to a win from Stoke City sending the club above Chelsea in the table. Chelsea's tenth-place finish marked the club's lowest finish in the Premier League since the 1995–96 season, in which they finished 11th. It also marked the worst defence of a title in the Premier League's 24-year history, and confirmed the club's absence from European competition in the 2016/17 season.

==== Final league position ====
Pos	Team	Pld	W	D	L	GF	GA	GD	Pts
8	Liverpool	38	16	12	10	63	50	+13	60
9	Stoke City	38	14	9	15	41	55	−14	51
10	Chelsea	38	12	14	12	59	53	+6	50
11	Everton	38	11	14	13	59	55	+4	47
12	Swansea City	38	12	11	15	42	52	−10	47

Source: Barclays Premier League
Rules for classification: 1) Points; 2) Goal difference; 3) Goals scored; 4) Play-offs (only if needed to decide champion, teams for relegation or teams for UEFA competitions).

== Club ==
=== Coaching staff ===
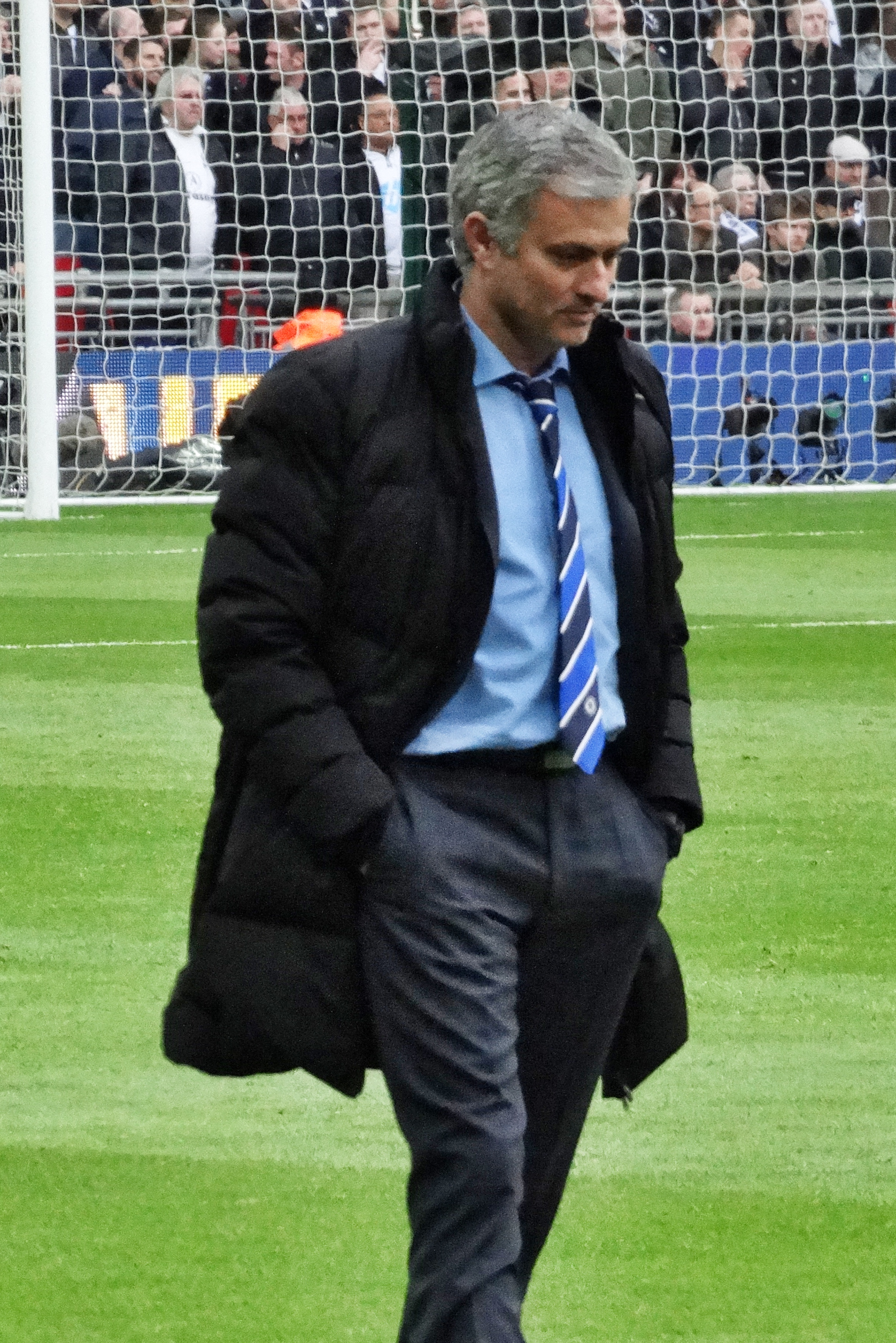
José Mourinho as Chelsea manager. Mourinho was sacked in December 2015.

Position	Staff
First-team Manager	(Netherlands) Guus Hiddink
Assistant Manager	(England) Steve Holland
Assistant Manager	(England) Eddie Newton
Technical Director	(Nigeria) Michael Emenalo
Goalkeeper Coach	(France) Christophe Lollichon
Fitness Coach	(England) Chris Jones
Assistant Fitness Coach	(Spain) Carlos Lalin
Senior Opposition Scout	(England) Mick McGiven
Medical Director	(Spain) Paco Biosca
Head of Youth Development	(England) Neil Bath
Under-21 Team Manager	(England) Adi Viveash
Under-18 Team Manager	(England) Joe Edwards
Head of Match Analysis/Scout	(England) James Melbourne
International Head Coach	(England) Dermot Drummy

Source: Chelsea F.C.

=== Other information ===
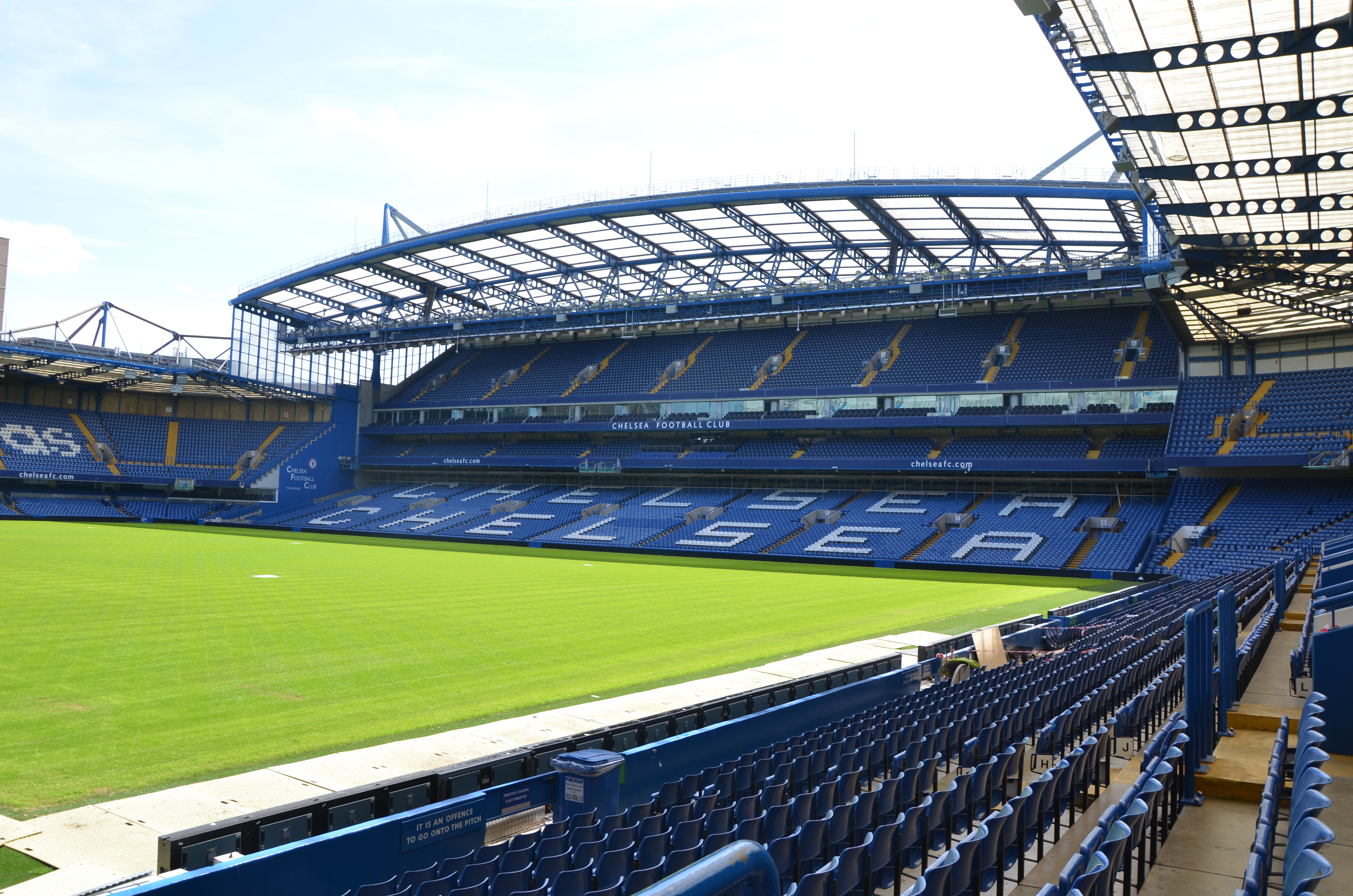
The Bridge

Owner	(Russia) Roman Abramovich
Chairman	(United States) Bruce Buck
Directors	(Russia) (Canada) Marina Granovskaia (Ukraine) (Canada) Eugene Tenenbaum
Ground (capacity and dimensions)	Stamford Bridge (41,663 / 103x67 metres)
Training ground	Cobham Training Centre

Source: Chelsea F.C.

== Squad information ==
=== First team squad ===
As of 11 May 2016.

Squad no.	Name	Nationality	Position(s)	Date of birth (age)
Goalkeepers
1	Asmir Begović HG^{1}	(Bosnia and Herzegovina)	GK	20 June 1987 (aged 28)
13	Thibaut Courtois	(Belgium)	GK	11 May 1992 (aged 24)
32	Marco Amelia	(Italy)	GK	2 April 1982 (aged 34)
33	Mitchell Beeney U21	(England)	GK	3 October 1995 (aged 20)
40	Bradley Collins U21	(England)	GK	18 February 1997 (aged 19)
Defenders
2	Branislav Ivanović	(Serbia)	RB / CB	22 February 1984 (aged 32)
5	Kurt Zouma U21	(France)	CB / DM	27 October 1994 (aged 21)
6	Baba Rahman U21	(Ghana)	LB	2 July 1994 (aged 21)
20	Matt Miazga U21	(United States)	CB	19 July 1995 (aged 20)
24	Gary Cahill HG^{1}	(England)	CB	19 December 1985 (aged 30)
26	John Terry HG^{2}	(England)	CB	7 December 1980 (aged 35)
28	César Azpilicueta	(Spain)	RB / LB	28 August 1989 (aged 26)
34	Ola Aina U21	(England)	CB / RB	8 October 1996 (aged 19)
37	Jake Clarke-Salter U21	(England)	CB	22 September 1997 (aged 18)
39	Fankaty Dabo U21	(England)	RB	11 October 1995 (aged 20)
43	Fikayo Tomori U21	(England)	CB / RB	19 December 1997 (aged 18)
Midfielders
4	Cesc Fàbregas HG^{1}	(Spain)	CM / AM	4 May 1987 (aged 29)
8	Oscar	(Brazil)	AM / RW / CM	9 September 1991 (aged 24)
10	Eden Hazard	(Belgium)	LW / AM / RW	7 January 1991 (aged 25)
12	John Obi Mikel	(Nigeria)	DM / CM	22 April 1987 (aged 29)
14	Bertrand Traoré U21	(Burkina Faso)	RW / LW / CF	6 September 1995 (aged 20)
16	Kenedy U21	(Brazil)	LW / AM / RW	8 February 1996 (aged 20)
17	Pedro	(Spain)	RW / LW	28 July 1987 (aged 28)
21	Nemanja Matić	(Serbia)	DM / CM	1 August 1988 (aged 27)
22	Willian	(Brazil)	AM / RW	9 August 1988 (aged 27)
36	Ruben Loftus-Cheek U21	(England)	CM	23 January 1996 (aged 20)
38	Kasey Palmer U21	(England)	AM	9 November 1996 (aged 19)
41	Charlie Colkett U21	(England)	CM	4 September 1996 (aged 19)
Strikers
9	Radamel Falcao	(Colombia)	CF	10 February 1986 (aged 30)
11	Alexandre Pato	(Brazil)	CF	2 September 1989 (aged 26)
18	Loïc Rémy	(France)	CF	2 January 1987 (aged 29)
19	Diego Costa	(Spain)	CF	7 October 1988 (aged 27)
42	Tammy Abraham U21	(England)	CF	2 October 1997 (aged 18)

- HG^{1} = Association-trained player
- HG^{2} = Club-trained player
- U21 = Under-21 player

== New contracts ==
No.	Pos	Player	Contract length	Contract end	Date	Source
—	CB	(Denmark) Andreas Christensen	5 years	2020	10 June 2015	
—	ST	(England) Patrick Bamford	3 years	2018	21 July 2015	
—	CB	(Czech Republic) Tomáš Kalas	3 years	2018	23 July 2015	
—	RB	(England) Todd Kane	3 years	2018	3 August 2015	
—	CB	(Netherlands) Nathan Aké	5 years	2020	14 August 2015	
—	LW	(Nigeria) Victor Moses	4 years	2019	1 September 2015	
—	LW	(England) Izzy Brown	4 years	2019	1 September 2015	
7	CM	(Brazil) Ramires	4 years	2019	29 October 2015	
37	CB	(England) Jake Clarke-Salter	4 years	2019	16 November 2015	
24	CB	(England) Gary Cahill	4 years	2019	2 December 2015	
2	CB	(Serbia) Branislav Ivanović	1 year	2017	22 January 2016	
38	CM	(England) Kasey Palmer	4 years	2020	2 February 2016	
—	CM	(United States) Kyle Scott	4 years	2020	2 February 2016	
36	CM	(England) Ruben Loftus-Cheek	5 years	2021	29 February 2016	
—	CB	(England) Dion Conroy	2 years	2018	29 February 2016	
41	CM	(England) Charlie Colkett	3 years	2019	22 April 2016	
26	CB	(England) John Terry	1 year	2017	18 May 2016	

== Transfers ==
=== In ===
==== Summer ====
No.	Pos	Player	Transferred from	Fee	Date	Source
—	AM	(Brazil) Nathan	(Brazil) Atlético Paranaense	£4,500,000	1 July 2015	
—	DM	(Sweden) Joseph Colley	(Sweden) Brommapojkarna	Undisclosed	1 July 2015	
1	GK	(Bosnia and Herzegovina) Asmir Begović	(England) Stoke City	£8,000,000	13 July 2015	
—	CM	(Serbia) Danilo Pantić	(Serbia) Partizan	£1,250,000	23 July 2015	
6	LB	(Ghana) Baba Rahman	(Germany) Augsburg	£14,000,000	17 August 2015	
17	RW	(Spain) Pedro	(Spain) Barcelona	£21,400,000	20 August 2015	
16	AM	(Brazil) Kenedy	(Brazil) Fluminense	£6,300,000	23 August 2015	
15	CB	(Senegal) Papy Djilobodji	(France) Nantes	£2,700,000	1 September 2015	
—	CB	(Jamaica) Michael Hector	(England) Reading	£4,000,000	1 September 2015	
32	GK	(Italy) Marco Amelia	(Italy) Lupa Castelli Romani	Free	8 October 2015	

==== Winter ====
No.	Pos	Player	Transferred from	Fee	Date	Source
20	CB	(United States) Matt Miazga	(United States) New York Red Bulls	£3,500,000	30 January 2016	

=== Out ===
==== Summer ====
No.	Pos	Player	Transferred to	Fee	Date	Source
—	AM	(Belgium) Thorgan Hazard	(Germany) Borussia Mönchengladbach	£5,850,000	1 July 2015	
—	CB	(England) George Brady	(England) Sunderland	Free	1 July 2015	
—	LW	(France) Gaël Kakuta	(Spain) Sevilla	£2,500,000	1 July 2015	
1	GK	(Czech Republic) Petr Čech	(England) Arsenal	£10,000,000	1 July 2015	
20	CM	(England) Josh McEachran	(England) Brentford	£750,000	10 July 2015	
11	ST	(Ivory Coast) Didier Drogba	(Canada) Montreal Impact	Free	27 July 2015	
3	LB	(Brazil) Filipe Luís	(Spain) Atlético Madrid	£11,100,000	28 July 2015	
—	DM	(Spain) Oriol Romeu	(England) Southampton	£5,000,000	13 August 2015	
—	AM	(England) Dan Kemp	(England) West Ham United	Free	11 November 2015	
—	AM	(Mexico) Ulises Dávila	(Mexico) Santos Laguna	Undisclosed	5 December 2015	

==== Winter ====
No.	Pos	Player	Transferred to	Fee	Date	Source
—	AM	(Poland) Hubert Adamczyk	(Poland) KS Cracovia	Free	14 January 2016	
7	CM	(Brazil) Ramires	(China) Jiangsu Suning	£25,000,000	27 January 2016	
—	RW	(Brunei) Faiq Bolkiah	(England) Leicester City	Free	15 March 2016	
—	AM	(Portugal) Domingos Quina	(England) West Ham United	Free	23 April 2016	

=== Loan in ===
==== Summer ====
No.	Pos	Player	Loaned from	Start	End	Source
9	ST	(Colombia) Radamel Falcao	(France) Monaco	3 July 2015	30 June 2016	

==== Winter ====
No.	Pos	Player	Loaned from	Start	End	Source
11	ST	(Brazil) Alexandre Pato	(Brazil) Corinthians	29 January 2016	30 June 2016	

=== Loan out ===
Chelsea had 37 players spend time out on loan in 2015–16, with five playing for two different clubs. Stipe Perica had signed a deal to spend the entire season out on loan prior to the 2015–16 season, while a further 29 exited for the entire season by the end of the summer transfer window. Six returned prematurely prior to or during the winter window, but by its close four of that group had exited on new deals to the end of the campaign. John Swift, who joined Brentford on 1 October, ultimately had his loan extended to the end of the season, while two further players exited on new season-long deals in January.

==== Summer ====
No.	Pos	Player	Loaned to	Start	End	Source
—	ST	(Croatia) Stipe Perica	(Italy) Udinese	2 February 2015	30 June 2016	
—	LW	(Ghana) Christian Atsu	(England) Bournemouth	1 July 2015	4 January 2016	
—	AM	(England) Lewis Baker	(Netherlands) Vitesse Arnhem	1 July 2015	30 June 2016	
—	CM	(Croatia) Mario Pašalić	(France) Monaco	3 July 2015	30 June 2016	
—	CB	(Denmark) Andreas Christensen	(Germany) Borussia Mönchengladbach	10 July 2015	30 June 2016	
—	LW	(England) Izzy Brown	(Netherlands) Vitesse Arnhem	10 July 2015	30 June 2016	
—	AM	(Brazil) Nathan	(Netherlands) Vitesse Arnhem	10 July 2015	30 June 2016	
—	CM	(Netherlands) Marco van Ginkel	(England) Stoke City	10 July 2015	1 February 2016	
—	AM	(Ivory Coast) Victorien Angban	(Belgium) Sint-Truiden	14 July 2015	30 June 2016	
—	CB	(Czech Republic) Tomáš Kalas	(England) Middlesbrough	17 July 2015	30 June 2016	
—	DM	(England) Jordan Houghton	(England) Gillingham	20 July 2015	3 January 2016	
—	CB	(Nigeria) Kenneth Omeruo	(Turkey) Kasımpaşa	21 July 2015	30 June 2016	
—	ST	(England) Patrick Bamford	(England) Crystal Palace	21 July 2015	4 January 2016	
—	RB	(Brazil) Wallace	(Italy) Carpi	22 July 2015	7 January 2016	
—	CM	(Serbia) Danilo Pantić	(Netherlands) Vitesse Arnhem	23 July 2015	30 June 2016	
—	AM	(Mexico) Ulises Dávila	(Portugal) Vitória	3 August 2015	5 December 2015	
—	ST	(England) Dominic Solanke	(Netherlands) Vitesse Arnhem	4 August 2015	30 June 2016	
—	ST	(Colombia) Joao Rodríguez	(Belgium) Sint-Truiden	4 August 2015	30 June 2016	
—	RB	(England) Todd Kane	(Netherlands) NEC Nijmegen	6 August 2015	30 June 2016	
—	RW	(Egypt) Mohamed Salah	(Italy) Roma	6 August 2015	30 June 2016	
—	GK	(Croatia) Matej Delač	(Bosnia and Herzegovina) Sarajevo	7 August 2015	30 June 2016	
—	CB	(Scotland) Alex Davey	(England) Peterborough United	8 August 2015	2 January 2016	
—	LM	(Chile) Cristián Cuevas	(Belgium) Sint-Truiden	10 August 2015	30 June 2016	
—	CB	(Netherlands) Nathan Aké	(England) Watford	14 August 2015	30 June 2016	
—	RW	(Colombia) Juan Cuadrado	(Italy) Juventus	25 August 2015	30 June 2016	
—	LW	(Germany) Marko Marin	(Turkey) Trabzonspor	25 August 2015	30 June 2016	
—	AM	(France) Jérémie Boga	(France) Stade Rennais	31 August 2015	30 June 2016	
—	AM	(Brazil) Lucas Piazon	(England) Reading	31 August 2015	28 April 2016	
—	LW	(Nigeria) Victor Moses	(England) West Ham United	1 September 2015	30 June 2016	
—	ST	(Scotland) Islam Feruz	(Scotland) Hibernian	1 September 2015	16 January 2016	
—	CB	(Jamaica) Michael Hector	(England) Reading	1 September 2015	28 April 2016	
—	DM	(England) Nathaniel Chalobah	(Italy) Napoli	1 September 2015	30 June 2016	
—	CM	(England) John Swift	(England) Brentford	1 October 2015	30 June 2016	

==== Winter ====
No.	Pos	Player	Loaned to	Start	End	Source
—	RB	(Brazil) Wallace	(Brazil) Grêmio	7 January 2016	30 June 2017	
33	GK	(England) Mitchell Beeney	(Wales) Newport County	15 January 2016	25 February 2016	
15	CB	(Senegal) Papy Djilobodji	(Germany) Werder Bremen	21 January 2016	30 June 2016	
—	RW	(England) Alex Kiwomya	(England) Fleetwood Town	21 January 2016	20 February 2016	
—	RW	(Ghana) Christian Atsu	(Spain) Málaga	25 January 2016	30 June 2016	
—	AM	(Belgium) Charly Musonda	(Spain) Real Betis	29 January 2016	30 June 2016	
—	ST	(England) Patrick Bamford	(England) Norwich City	30 January 2016	30 June 2016	
—	CM	(Netherlands) Marco van Ginkel	(Netherlands) PSV	1 February 2016	30 June 2016	
—	CM	(England) Jordan Houghton	(England) Plymouth Argyle	10 March 2016	30 June 2016	
—	CB	(Scotland) Alex Davey	(Norway) Stabæk	15 March 2016	22 July 2016	
27	GK	(England) Jamal Blackman	(Sweden) Östersunds FK	18 March 2016	31 May 2016	

=== Overall transfer activity ===
==== Spending ====
Summer: ▼£64,450,000

Winter: ▼£3,500,000

Total: ▼£67,950,000

==== Income ====
Summer: ▲£35,200,000

Winter: ▲£25,000,000

Total: ▲£60,200,000

==== Expenditure ====
Summer: ▼£29,250,000

Winter: ▲£21,500,000

Total: ▼£7,750,000

== Pre-season ==
On 28 April 2015, the schedule for the 2015 International Champions Cup was announced that Chelsea would play New York Red Bulls, Paris Saint-Germain, Barcelona and Fiorentina.

22 July 2015 International Champions Cup	New York Red Bulls	4–2	Chelsea	Harrison, New Jersey, USA
20:00 EDT	Davis (yellow card) 20', (goal) 73', 77'; Castellanos 51'; Miller (yellow card) 62'; Adams 70'	Report	Rémy 26'; Hazard 75'	Stadium: Red Bull Arena; Attendance: 24,076; Referee: Robert Sibiga

25 July 2015 International Champions Cup	Paris Saint-Germain	1–1 (5–6 p)	Chelsea	Charlotte, North Carolina, USA
18:00 EDT	Ibrahimović 25'; Rabiot (yellow card) 52'; Aurier (yellow card) 59'	Report	Azpilicueta (yellow card) 34'; Moses 65'	Stadium: Bank of America Stadium; Attendance: 61,224; Referee: Ted Unkel
	Penalties
	Motta (penalty scored); Rabiot (penalty scored); Ongenda (penalty scored); Bahebeck (penalty missed); Cavani (penalty scored); Marquinhos (penalty scored); Silva (penalty missed)		(penalty scored) Falcao; (penalty scored) Azpilicueta; (penalty missed) Cuadrado; (penalty scored) Rémy; (penalty scored) Oscar; (penalty scored) Willian; (penalty scored) Courtois

28 July 2015 International Champions Cup	Chelsea	2–2 (4–2 p)	Barcelona	Landover, Maryland, USA
20:00 EDT	Hazard 10'; Cahill 86'	Report	Mathieu (yellow card) 42'; Suárez 52'; Sandro 66'; Alba (yellow card) 74'	Stadium: FedExField; Attendance: 78,914; Referee: Allen Chapman
	Penalties
	Falcao (penalty scored); Moses (penalty scored); Ramires (penalty scored); Rémy (penalty scored)		(penalty scored) Iniesta; (penalty missed) Halilović; (penalty missed) Piqué; (penalty scored) Sandro

5 August 2015 International Champions Cup	Chelsea	0–1	Fiorentina	London, England
20:00 BST	Zouma (yellow card) 90+2'; Matić (yellow card) 90+2'	Report	Rodríguez 34'; Roncaglia (yellow card) 52'; Hegazy (yellow card) 83'; Joaquín (yellow card) 90+3'	Stadium: Stamford Bridge; Attendance: 41,435; Referee: David Coote

== Competitions ==
=== Overall ===
Competition	Started round	Final position / round	First match	Last match
Premier League	—	10th	8 August 2015	15 May 2016
FA Cup	Third round	Sixth round	10 January 2016	12 March 2016
League Cup	Third round	Fourth round	23 September 2015	27 October 2015
UEFA Champions League	Group stage	Round of 16	16 September 2015	9 March 2016
FA Community Shield	Final	Runners-up	2 August 2015	

Updated to match played 15 May 2016
Source: Competitions

=== Overview ===
Competition	Record							
Competition	G	W	D	L	GF	GA	GD	Win %
Premier League	38	12	14	12	59	53	+6	31.58
FA Cup	4	3	0	1	12	4	+8	75.00
League Cup	2	1	1	0	5	2	+3	50.00
Champions League	8	4	1	3	15	7	+8	50.00
FA Community Shield	1	0	0	1	0	1	−1	0.00
Total	53	20	16	17	91	67	+24	37.74

Updated to match played 15 May 2016
Source: Competitions

=== FA Community Shield ===
2 August 2015 Final	Arsenal	1–0	Chelsea	London
15:00 BST	Oxlade-Chamberlain 24'; Coquelin (yellow card) 67'	Report	Azpilicueta (yellow card) 65'	Stadium: Wembley Stadium; Attendance: 85,437; Referee: Anthony Taylor

=== Premier League ===
==== League table ====
Pos	Team	Pld	W	D	L	GF	GA	GD	Pts
8	Liverpool	38	16	12	10	63	50	+13	60
9	Stoke City	38	14	9	15	41	55	−14	51
10	Chelsea	38	12	14	12	59	53	+6	50
11	Everton	38	11	14	13	59	55	+4	47
12	Swansea City	38	12	11	15	42	52	−10	47

Source: Barclays Premier League
Rules for classification: 1) Points; 2) Goal difference; 3) Goals scored; 4) Play-offs (only if needed to decide champion, teams for relegation or teams for UEFA competitions).

==== Results summary ====
Overall								Home						Away					
Pld	W	D	L	GF	GA	GD	Pts	W	D	L	GF	GA	GD	W	D	L	GF	GA	GD
38	12	14	12	59	53	+6	50	5	9	5	32	30	+2	7	5	7	27	23	+4

Last updated: 15 May 2016.
Source: Premier League

==== Results by matchday ====
Matchday	1	2	3	4	5	6	7	8	9	10	11	12	13	14	15	16	17	18	19	20	21	22	23	24	25	26	27	28	29	30	31	32	33	34	35	36	37	38
Ground	H	A	A	H	A	H	A	H	H	A	H	A	H	A	H	A	H	H	A	A	H	H	A	A	H	H	A	A	H	H	A	A	H	A	H	A	A	H
Result	D	L	W	L	L	W	D	L	W	L	L	L	W	D	L	L	W	D	D	W	D	D	W	D	D	W	W	W	D	D	W	L	L	W	D	L	D	D
Position	5	16	9	13	16	13	15	16	11	15	15	16	15	14	14	16	15	15	14	14	14	14	13	13	13	12	11	8	10	10	10	10	10	9	9	9	9	10

Updated to match(es) played on 15 May 2016. Source: Statto
A = Away; H = Home; W = Win; D = Draw; L = Loss

==== Score overview ====
Win Draw Loss

Opposition	Home score	Away score	Aggregate score	Double
Arsenal	2–0	1–0	3–0	Yes
Aston Villa	2–0	4–0	6–0	Yes
Bournemouth	0–1	4–1	4–2	No
Crystal Palace	1–2	3–0	4–2	No
Everton	3–3	1–3	4–6	No
Leicester City	1–1	1–2	2–3	No
Liverpool	1–3	1–1	2–4	No
Manchester City	0–3	0–3	0–6	No
Manchester United	1–1	0–0	1–1	No
Newcastle United	5–1	2–2	7–3	No
Norwich City	1–0	2–1	3–1	Yes
Southampton	1–3	2–1	3–4	No
Stoke City	1–1	0–1	1–2	No
Sunderland	3–1	2–3	5–4	No
Swansea City	2–2	0–1	2–3	No
Tottenham Hotspur	2–2	0–0	2–2	No
Watford	2–2	0–0	2–2	No
West Bromwich Albion	2–2	3–2	5–4	No
West Ham United	2–2	1–2	2–3	No

==== Matches ====
Win Draw Loss

The fixtures for the 2015–16 season were announced on 17 June 2015 at 9 am.

8 August 2015 1	Chelsea	2–2	Swansea City	London
17:30 BST	Oscar 23'; Fernández 30' (o.g.); Courtois (red card) 52'; Terry (yellow card) 53'	Report	Shelvey (yellow card) 18'; Ayew 29'; Cork (yellow card) 45+2'; Gomis 55' (pen.); Williams (yellow card) 90+3'	Stadium: Stamford Bridge; Attendance: 41,232; Referee: Michael Oliver

16 August 2015 2	Manchester City	3–0	Chelsea	Manchester
16:00 BST	Agüero 32'; Kompany (yellow card) 33', (goal) 79'; Fernandinho (yellow card) 45+1', (goal) 85'; Touré (yellow card) 51'; Mangala (yellow card) 90+1'	Report	Ivanović (yellow card) 48'; Hazard (yellow card) 81'	Stadium: City of Manchester Stadium; Attendance: 54,331; Referee: Martin Atkinson

23 August 2015 3	West Bromwich Albion	2–3	Chelsea	West Bromwich
13:30 BST	Morrison (penalty missed) 14', 35', 59'; McClean (yellow card) 37'; McManaman (yellow card) 71'	Report	Matić (yellow card) 17'; Pedro 20'; Costa 30'; Azpilicueta 42'; Terry (red card) 54'	Stadium: The Hawthorns; Attendance: 23,256; Referee: Mark Clattenburg

29 August 2015 4	Chelsea	1–2	Crystal Palace	London
15:00 BST	Cahill (yellow card) 71'; Falcao 79'	Report	Sako 65'; Cabaye (yellow card) 73'; Ward 81'	Stadium: Stamford Bridge; Attendance: 41,581; Referee: Craig Pawson

12 September 2015 5	Everton	3–1	Chelsea	Liverpool
12:45 BST	Naismith 17', 22', 82'; Galloway (yellow card) 65'; Stones (yellow card) 87'	Report	Matić 36'; Azpilicueta (yellow card) 88'; Costa (yellow card) 90+3'	Stadium: Goodison Park; Attendance: 38,311; Referee: Andre Marriner

19 September 2015 6	Chelsea	2–0	Arsenal	London
12:45 BST	Costa (yellow card) 45+1'; Ivanović (yellow card) 49'; Zouma 53'; Oscar (yellow card) 64'; Chambers 90+1' (o.g.)	Report	Gabriel (yellow card) 45' (red card) 45+1'; Chambers (yellow card) 72'; Cazorla (yellow card) 30' (yellow-red card) 79'	Stadium: Stamford Bridge; Attendance: 41,584; Referee: Mike Dean

26 September 2015 7	Newcastle United	2–2	Chelsea	Newcastle upon Tyne
17:30 BST	Colback (yellow card) 34'; Pérez 42'; Wijnaldum 60'	Report	Ivanović (yellow card) 68'; Ramires 79'; Willian 86'; Pedro (yellow card) 90+7'	Stadium: St James' Park; Attendance: 48,682; Referee: Martin Atkinson

3 October 2015 8	Chelsea	1–3	Southampton	London
17:30 BST	Willian 10'; Ramires (yellow card) 43'; Falcao (yellow card) 57'	Report	Romeu (yellow card) 9'; Bertrand (yellow card) 26'; Mané (yellow card) 34', (goal) 60'; Davis 43'; Pellè 72', (yellow card) 86'; Ward-Prowse (yellow card) 77'	Stadium: Stamford Bridge; Attendance: 41,642; Referee: Robert Madley

17 October 2015 9	Chelsea	2–0	Aston Villa	London
15:00 BST	Costa 34'; Hutton 54' (o.g.); Willian (yellow card) 74'	Report	Ayew (yellow card) 49'; Richardson (yellow card) 62'; Grealish (yellow card) 85'	Stadium: Stamford Bridge; Attendance: 41,596; Referee: Roger East

24 October 2015 10	West Ham United	2–1	Chelsea	London
15:00 BST	Zárate 17'; Kouyaté (yellow card) 74'; Carroll 79'	Report	Azpilicueta (yellow card) 24'; Matić (yellow card) 35' (yellow-red card) 44'; Costa (yellow card) 45'; Fàbregas (yellow card) 45'; Cahill 56'; Willian (yellow card) 81'; Mikel (yellow card) 90+5'	Stadium: Boleyn Ground; Attendance: 34,977; Referee: Jonathan Moss

31 October 2015 11	Chelsea	1–3	Liverpool	London
12:45 GMT	Ramires 4'; Mikel (yellow card) 66'	Report	Coutinho (yellow card) 23', (goal) 45+3', 74'; Lucas (yellow card) 58'; Can (yellow card) 65'; Benteke 83', (yellow card) 86'	Stadium: Stamford Bridge; Attendance: 41,577; Referee: Mark Clattenburg

7 November 2015 12	Stoke City	1–0	Chelsea	Stoke-on-Trent
17:30 GMT	Whelan (yellow card) 44'; Arnautović 53'; Shawcross (yellow card) 57'; Johnson (yellow card) 90'	Report	Rahman (yellow card) 45+2'	Stadium: Britannia Stadium; Attendance: 27,550; Referee: Anthony Taylor

21 November 2015 13	Chelsea	1–0	Norwich City	London
15:00 GMT	Willian (yellow card) 35'; Costa 64'	Report	Mulumbu (yellow card) 31'; O'Neil (yellow card) 47'; Bassong (yellow card) 61'; Olsson (yellow card) 69'	Stadium: Stamford Bridge; Attendance: 41,582; Referee: Craig Pawson

29 November 2015 14	Tottenham Hotspur	0–0	Chelsea	London
12:00 GMT	Rose (yellow card) 32'; Kane (yellow card) 40'; Walker (yellow card) 45+1'; Vertonghen (yellow card) 53'	Report	Matić (yellow card) 59'; Azpilicueta (yellow card) 90+5'	Stadium: White Hart Lane; Attendance: 35,639; Referee: Michael Oliver

5 December 2015 15	Chelsea	0–1	Bournemouth	London
17:30 GMT	Pedro (yellow card) 21'; Costa (yellow card) 63'	Report	Surman (yellow card) 23'; Murray 82'	Stadium: Stamford Bridge; Attendance: 41,631; Referee: Mike Jones

14 December 2015 16	Leicester City	2–1	Chelsea	Leicester
20:00 GMT	Vardy 34', (yellow card) 46'; Mahrez 48'; Huth (yellow card) 50'	Report	Rémy 77'	Stadium: King Power Stadium; Attendance: 32,054; Referee: Mark Clattenburg

19 December 2015 17	Chelsea	3–1	Sunderland	London
15:00 GMT	Ivanović 5'; Pedro 13'; Oscar 50' (pen.); Matić (yellow card) 88'	Report	Pantilimon (yellow card) 48'; Borini 53'; Rodwell (yellow card) 62'; O'Shea (yellow card) 89'	Stadium: Stamford Bridge; Attendance: 41,562; Referee: Roger East

26 December 2015 18	Chelsea	2–2	Watford	London
15:00 GMT	Costa 32', 65', (yellow card) 88'	Report	Deeney 42' (pen.); Britos (yellow card) 44'; Cathcart (yellow card) 49'; Ighalo 56'; Holebas (yellow card) 81'; Behrami (yellow card) 83'	Stadium: Stamford Bridge; Attendance: 41,620; Referee: Andre Marriner

28 December 2015 19	Manchester United	0–0	Chelsea	Greater Manchester
17:30 GMT	Schneiderlin (yellow card) 30'; Smalling (yellow card) 39'; Schweinsteiger (yellow card) 81'; Rooney (yellow card) 90+1'	Report	Mikel (yellow card) 27'; Hazard (yellow card) 72'	Stadium: Old Trafford; Attendance: 75,275; Referee: Martin Atkinson

3 January 2016 20	Crystal Palace	0–3	Chelsea	London
13:30 GMT	Delaney (yellow card) 13'; Jedinak (yellow card) 57'; Dann (yellow card) 80'	Report	Oscar 29'; Willian 60'; Costa 66'	Stadium: Selhurst Park; Attendance: 24,854; Referee: Kevin Friend

13 January 2016 21	Chelsea	2–2	West Bromwich Albion	London
19:45 GMT	Azpilicueta 20', (yellow card) 85'; Costa (yellow card) 49'; Courtois (yellow card) 70'; McAuley 73' (o.g.)	Report	Yacob (yellow card) 25'; Gardner 33'; Myhill (yellow card) 68'; McClean (yellow card) 70', (goal) 86'	Stadium: Stamford Bridge; Attendance: 40,945; Referee: Anthony Taylor

16 January 2016 22	Chelsea	3–3	Everton	London
15:00 GMT	Costa 64'; Fàbregas 66'; Terry 90+8', (yellow card) 90+9'	Report	Terry 50' (o.g.); Mirallas 56'; Funes Mori 90+1', (yellow card) 90+2'	Stadium: Stamford Bridge; Attendance: 41,633; Referee: Mike Jones

24 January 2016 23	Arsenal	0–1	Chelsea	London
16:00 GMT	Mertesacker (red card) 18'; Flamini (yellow card) 45'	Report	Oscar (yellow card) 11'; Costa 23'; Matić (yellow card) 60'; Mikel (yellow card) 72'	Stadium: Emirates Stadium; Attendance: 60,072; Referee: Mark Clattenburg

3 February 2016 24	Watford	0–0	Chelsea	Watford
19:45 GMT	Prödl (yellow card) 19'; Paredes (yellow card) 45+2'	Report	Costa (yellow card) 45+2'	Stadium: Vicarage Road; Attendance: 20,910; Referee: Mike Dean

7 February 2016 25	Chelsea	1–1	Manchester United	London
16:00 GMT	Costa 90+1'	Report	Lingard 61', (yellow card) 79'; Blind (yellow card) 63'; Smalling (yellow card) 83'	Stadium: Stamford Bridge; Attendance: 41,434; Referee: Michael Oliver

13 February 2016 26	Chelsea	5–1	Newcastle United	London
17:30 GMT	Costa 5'; Pedro 9', 59'; Willian 17'; Traoré 83'	Report	Taylor (yellow card) 19'; Shelvey (yellow card) 61'; Townsend 90'	Stadium: Stamford Bridge; Attendance: 41,622; Referee: Roger East

27 February 2016 27	Southampton	1–2	Chelsea	Southampton
15:00 GMT	Davis (yellow card) 19'; Long 42'; Bertrand (yellow card) 64'; Clasie (yellow card) 65'	Report	Costa (yellow card) 63'; Fàbregas 75'; Ivanović 89'	Stadium: St Mary's Stadium; Attendance: 31,688; Referee: Martin Atkinson

1 March 2016 28	Norwich City	1–2	Chelsea	Norwich
19:45 GMT	Howson (yellow card) 13'; Bennett (yellow card) 39'; Redmond 68'; Klose (yellow card) 76'	Report	Kenedy 1'; Oscar (yellow card) 44'; Costa 45+1'; Fàbregas (yellow card) 73'	Stadium: Carrow Road; Attendance: 27,091; Referee: Lee Mason

5 March 2016 29	Chelsea	1–1	Stoke City	London
15:00 GMT	Traoré 39'; Oscar (yellow card) 45'	Report	Pieters (yellow card) 53'; Whelan (yellow card) 73'; Diouf 85'	Stadium: Stamford Bridge; Attendance: 41,381; Referee: Mark Clattenburg

19 March 2016 30	Chelsea	2–2	West Ham United	London
15:00 GMT	Ivanović (yellow card) 16'; Fàbregas 45+3', 89' (pen.), (yellow card) 90+1'; Willian (yellow card) 90+1'	Report	Lanzini 17'; Reid (yellow card) 45+2'; Ogbonna (yellow card) 45+3'; Carroll 61'; Kouyaté (yellow card) 64'; Antonio (yellow card) 88'; Adrián (yellow card) 89'	Stadium: Stamford Bridge; Attendance: 41,623; Referee: Robert Madley

2 April 2016 31	Aston Villa	0–4	Chelsea	Birmingham
12:45 BST	Gueye (yellow card) 28'; Cissokho (yellow card) 45+2'; Sánchez (yellow card) 61'; Hutton (yellow card) 78' (yellow-red card) 85'; Westwood (yellow card) 87'	Report	Loftus-Cheek 26'; Fàbregas (yellow card) 29'; Pato 45+3' (pen.); Pedro 46', 59'	Stadium: Villa Park; Attendance: 31,120; Referee: Neil Swarbrick

9 April 2016 32	Swansea City	1–0	Chelsea	Swansea
15:00 BST	Sigurðsson 25'; Rangel (yellow card) 30'; Taylor (yellow card) 43'; Paloschi (yellow card) 70'; Fer (yellow card) 79'	Report	Azpilicueta (yellow card) 36'; Miazga (yellow card) 40'; Pedro (yellow card) 71'; Fàbregas (yellow card) 76'	Stadium: Liberty Stadium; Attendance: 20,966; Referee: Andre Marriner

16 April 2016 33	Chelsea	0–3	Manchester City	London
17:30 BST	Azpilicueta (yellow card) 62'; Mikel (yellow card) 72'; Courtois (red card) 78'	Report	Zabaleta (yellow card) 29'; Agüero 33', 54', 80' (pen.); Otamendi (yellow card) 45+1'; Nasri (yellow card) 47'	Stadium: Stamford Bridge; Attendance: 41,212; Referee: Mike Dean

23 April 2016 34	Bournemouth	1–4	Chelsea	Bournemouth
15:00 BST	Elphick 36'; Ritchie (yellow card) 89'	Report	Pedro 5'; Hazard 34', 90+1'; Willian 71'	Stadium: Dean Court; Attendance: 11,365; Referee: Roger East

2 May 2016 35	Chelsea	2–2	Tottenham Hotspur	London
20:00 BST	Willian (yellow card) 45+1'; Cahill 58'; Ivanović (yellow card) 71'; Hazard 83'; Mikel (yellow card) 87'	Report	Walker (yellow card) 27'; Kane 35', (yellow card) 90+5'; Vertonghen (yellow card) 38'; Son 44'; Rose (yellow card) 45+1'; Lamela (yellow card) 51'; Ériksen (yellow card) 70'; Dier (yellow card) 87'; Dembélé (yellow card) 90+5'; Mason (yellow card) 90+6'	Stadium: Stamford Bridge; Attendance: 41,545; Referee: Mark Clattenburg

7 May 2016 36	Sunderland	3–2	Chelsea	Sunderland
15:00 BST	Khazri 41'; Cattermole (yellow card) 52'; Borini 67'; Defoe (yellow card) 70', (goal) 70'; Kaboul (yellow card) 87'; Larsson (yellow card) 88'	Report	Cahill (yellow card) 1'; Costa 14'; Matić 45+3'; Terry (yellow card) 87' (yellow-red card) 90+5'	Stadium: Stadium of Light; Attendance: 47,050; Referee: Mike Jones

11 May 2016 37	Liverpool	1–1	Chelsea	Liverpool
20:00 BST	Can (yellow card) 44'; Touré (yellow card) 48'; Milner (yellow card) 73'; Benteke 90+2'	Report	Hazard 32'; Azpilicueta (yellow card) 87'	Stadium: Anfield; Attendance: 43,210; Referee: Michael Oliver

15 May 2016 38	Chelsea	1–1	Leicester City	London
15:00 BST	Fàbregas 66' (pen.)	Report	Drinkwater 82'	Stadium: Stamford Bridge; Attendance: 41,494; Referee: Craig Pawson

=== FA Cup ===
Win Draw Loss

10 January 2016 Third round	Chelsea	2–0	Scunthorpe United	London
14:00 GMT	Costa 13'; Ivanović (yellow card) 66'; Loftus-Cheek 68'	Report	Dawson (yellow card) 63'	Stadium: Stamford Bridge; Attendance: 41,625; Referee: Craig Pawson

31 January 2016 Fourth round	Milton Keynes Dons	1–5	Chelsea	Milton Keynes
16:00 GMT	Potter 21'; Walsh (yellow card) 74'; Spence (yellow card) 80'	Report	Oscar 15', 32', 44'; Terry (yellow card) 31'; Hazard 55' (pen.); Traoré 62'	Stadium: Stadium mk Attendance: 28,127; Referee: Jonathan Moss

21 February 2016 Fifth round	Chelsea	5–1	Manchester City	London
16:00 GMT	Costa 35'; Willian 48'; Cahill 53'; Hazard 67'; Traoré 89'	Report	Faupala 37'; Demichelis (yellow card) 65'	Stadium: Stamford Bridge; Attendance: 41,594; Referee: Andre Marriner

12 March 2016 Sixth round	Everton	2–0	Chelsea	Liverpool
17:30 GMT	Jagielka (yellow card) 42'; Lukaku 77', 82'; Barry (yellow card) 84' (red card) 87'	Report	Costa (yellow card) 11' (red card) 84'; Fàbregas (yellow card) 62'	Stadium: Goodison Park; Attendance: 37,283; Referee: Michael Oliver

=== League Cup ===
Win Draw Loss

23 September 2015 Third round	Walsall	1–4	Chelsea	Walsall
19:45 BST	O'Connor 45+1'; Chambers (yellow card) 59'; Forde (yellow card) 83'	Report	Ramires 10'; Mikel (yellow card) 39'; Rémy 41'; Terry (yellow card) 52'; Kenedy 52'; Pedro 90+2'	Stadium: Bescot Stadium; Attendance: 10,525; Referee: Lee Mason

27 October 2015 Fourth round	Stoke City	1–1 (a.e.t.) (5–4 p)	Chelsea	Stoke-on-Trent
19:45 GMT	Bardsley (yellow card) 17' (yellow-red card) 90+3'; Walters 52'; Wilson (yellow card) 81'	Report	Rahman (yellow card) 36'; Rémy 90+1'	Stadium: Britannia Stadium; Attendance: 24,886; Referee: Kevin Friend
	Penalties
	Adam (penalty scored); Odemwingie (penalty scored); Shaqiri (penalty scored); Wilson (penalty scored); Arnautović (penalty scored)		(penalty scored) Willian; (penalty scored) Oscar; (penalty scored) Rémy; (penalty scored) Zouma; (penalty missed) Hazard

=== UEFA Champions League ===
Chelsea qualified for the Group Stage of the 2015–16 UEFA Champions League by winning the 2014–15 Premier League. Having previously been seeded in pot 1 for the Champions League drew as one of the top eight ranked teams in UEFA, Chelsea would remain staying in pot 1 despite the changes to UEFA qualification rules, where pot 1 for group stage draws would now consist of the Champions League holders and the champions of the seven highest ranked associations. The group stage draw was made on 27 August 2015 in Monaco, France. Chelsea were to face Porto, Dynamo Kyiv and Maccabi Tel Aviv. Scoring a total of 13 points, Chelsea advanced to the knockout stage as group winners by winning against Porto, and sending the Portuguese side to the Europa League, in the last round.

==== Group stage ====
Pos	Team	Pld	W	D	L	GF	GA	GD	Pts	Qualification	CHE	DKV	POR	MTA
1	(England) Chelsea	6	4	1	1	13	3	+10	13	Advance to knockout phase	—	2–1	2–0	4–0
2	(Ukraine) Dynamo Kyiv	6	3	2	1	8	4	+4	11	Advance to knockout phase	0–0	—	2–2	1–0
3	(Portugal) Porto	6	3	1	2	9	8	+1	10	Transfer to Europa League	2–1	0–2	—	2–0
4	(Israel) Maccabi Tel Aviv	6	0	0	6	1	16	−15	0		0–4	0–2	1–3	—

Source: UEFA
Rules for classification: Group stage tiebreakers

Win Draw Loss

16 September 2015 1	Chelsea (England)	4–0	(Israel) Maccabi Tel Aviv	London, England
19:45 BST	Loftus-Cheek (yellow card) 1'; Willian 15'; Oscar 45+4' (pen.); Costa 58'; Fàbregas 78'	Report	Rajković (yellow card) 5'; Nosa (yellow card) 33'; Ben Haim (yellow card) 45+2'	Stadium: Stamford Bridge; Attendance: 40,684; Referee: Felix Zwayer (Germany)

29 September 2015 2	Porto (Portugal)	2–1	(England) Chelsea	Porto, Portugal
19:45 BST	Martins Indi (yellow card) 19'; Marcano (yellow card) 25'; André 39'; Maicon 52'; D. Pereira (yellow card) 82'; Imbula (yellow card) 89'	Report	Cahill (yellow card) 41'; Willian 45+2'; Azpilicueta (yellow card) 66'; Matić (yellow card) 79'	Stadium: Estádio do Dragão; Attendance: 46,120; Referee: Antonio Mateu Lahoz (Spain)

20 October 2015 3	Dynamo Kyiv (Ukraine)	0–0	(England) Chelsea	Kyiv, Ukraine
19:45 BST	Buyalskyi (yellow card) 65'	Report	Zouma (yellow card) 67'	Stadium: Olympic Stadium; Attendance: 60,291; Referee: Damir Skomina (Slovenia)

4 November 2015 4	Chelsea (England)	2–1	(Ukraine) Dynamo Kyiv	London, England
19:45 GMT	Dragović 34' (o.g.); Willian 83'	Report	González (yellow card) 26'; Antunes (yellow card) 59'; Buyalskyi (yellow card) 72'; Dragović 77'	Stadium: Stamford Bridge; Attendance: 41,241; Referee: Pavel Královec (Czech Republic)

24 November 2015 5	Maccabi Tel Aviv (Israel)	0–4	(England) Chelsea	Haifa, Israel
19:45 GMT	Ben Haim (red card) 40'	Report	Cahill 20'; Matić (yellow card) 59'; Willian 73'; Oscar 77'; Fàbregas (yellow card) 83'; Zouma 90+1'	Stadium: Sammy Ofer Stadium; Attendance: 29,121; Referee: Alberto Undiano Mallenco (Spain)

9 December 2015 6	Chelsea (England)	2–0	(Portugal) Porto	London, England
19:45 GMT	Marcano 13' (o.g.); Costa (yellow card) 20'; Matić (yellow card) 31'; Willian 52'; Ivanović (yellow card) 74'	Report	M. Pereira (yellow card) 34'; D. Pereira (yellow card) 41'; Martins Indi (yellow card) 43'	Stadium: Stamford Bridge; Attendance: 41,096; Referee: Cüneyt Çakir (Turkey)

==== Knockout phase ====
===== Round of 16 =====
16 February 2016 First leg	Paris Saint-Germain (France)	2–1	(England) Chelsea	Paris, France
19:45 GMT	Ibrahimović (yellow card) 19', (goal) 39'; Lucas (yellow card) 70'; David Luiz (yellow card) 70'; Cavani 78'	Report	Mikel (yellow card) 38', (goal) 45+1'; Pedro (yellow card) 67'	Stadium: Parc des Princes; Attendance: 46,505; Referee: Carlos Velasco Carballo (Spain)

9 March 2016 Second leg	Chelsea (England)	1–2 (2–4 agg.)	(France) Paris Saint-Germain	London, England
19:45 GMT	Costa 27'; Fàbregas (yellow card) 45'; Mikel (yellow card) 53'; Ivanović (yellow card) 90'	Report	Rabiot (yellow card) 33'; Motta (yellow card) 41'; Ibrahimović 10', 67'; Matuidi (yellow card) 86'	Stadium: Stamford Bridge; Attendance: 37,591; Referee: Felix Brych (Germany)

== Statistics ==
=== Appearances ===
No.	Pos.	Name	Premier League		FA Cup		League Cup		Champions League		Community Shield		Total		Discipline	
No.	Pos.	Name	Apps	Goals	Apps	Goals	Apps	Goals	Apps	Goals	Apps	Goals	Apps	Goals	Yellow card	Red card
1	GK	(Bosnia and Herzegovina) Asmir Begović	15 (2)	0	1	0	2	0	5	0	0	0	23 (2)	0	0	0
2	DF	(Serbia) Branislav Ivanović	33	2	4	0	1	0	4	0	1	0	43	2	8	0
4	MF	(Spain) Cesc Fàbregas	33 (4)	5	4	0	0	0	7	1	1	0	44 (4)	6	7	0
5	DF	(France) Kurt Zouma	21 (2)	1	1	0	1	0	5 (1)	1	0 (1)	0	28 (4)	2	1	0
6	DF	(Ghana) Baba Rahman	11 (4)	0	2	0	2	0	4	0	0	0	19 (4)	0	2	0
8	MF	(Brazil) Oscar	20 (7)	3	3 (1)	3	1	0	4 (3)	2	0 (1)	0	28 (12)	9	4	0
9	FW	(Colombia) Radamel Falcao	1 (9)	1	0	0	1	0	0	0	0 (1)	0	2 (10)	1	1	0
10	MF	(Belgium) Eden Hazard	25 (6)	4	2	2	1	0	6 (2)	0	1	0	35 (8)	6	2	0
11	FW	(Brazil) Alexandre Pato	1 (1)	1	0	0	0	0	0	0	0	0	1 (1)	1	0	0
12	MF	(Nigeria) John Obi Mikel	19 (6)	0	2	0	2	0	3 (1)	1	0	0	26 (7)	1	8	0
13	GK	(Belgium) Thibaut Courtois	23	0	3	0	0	0	3	0	1	0	30	0	0	2
14	MF	(Burkina Faso) Bertrand Traoré	4 (6)	2	0 (3)	2	0 (1)	0	0 (2)	0	0	0	4 (12)	4	0	0
16	MF	(Brazil) Kenedy	4 (10)	1	1 (1)	0	1 (1)	1	1 (1)	0	0	0	7 (13)	2	0	0
17	MF	(Spain) Pedro	24 (5)	7	3 (1)	0	0 (1)	1	3 (3)	0	0	0	30 (10)	8	4	0
18	FW	(France) Loïc Rémy	3 (10)	1	0 (1)	0	1 (1)	2	1 (2)	0	1	0	6 (14)	3	0	0
19	FW	(Spain) Diego Costa	27 (1)	12	4	2	1	0	7 (1)	2	0	0	38 (2)	16	10	1
20	DF	(United States) Matt Miazga	2	0	0	0	0	0	0	0	0	0	2	0	1	0
21	MF	(Serbia) Nemanja Matić	28 (5)	2	2 (1)	0	0 (1)	0	4 (1)	0	1	0	35 (8)	2	7	1
22	MF	(Brazil) Willian	32 (3)	5	3 (1)	1	1	0	8	5	1	0	45 (4)	11	5	0
24	DF	(England) Gary Cahill	21 (2)	2	4	1	2	0	6 (1)	1	1	0	34 (2)	4	3	0
26	DF	(England) John Terry	24	1	1 (1)	0	2	0	4	0	1	0	32 (1)	1	5	2
28	DF	(Spain) César Azpilicueta	36 (1)	2	3	0	0	0	8	0	1	0	48 (1)	2	9	0
32	GK	(Italy) Marco Amelia	0	0	0	0	0	0	0	0	0	0	0	0	0	0
34	DF	(England) Ola Aina	0	0	0	0	0	0	0	0	0	0	0	0	0	0
36	MF	(England) Ruben Loftus-Cheek	4 (9)	1	1 (1)	1	1	0	1	0	0	0	7 (10)	2	1	0
37	DF	(England) Jake Clarke-Salter	0 (1)	0	0	0	0	0	0	0	0	0	0 (1)	0	0	0
38	MF	(England) Kasey Palmer	0	0	0	0	0	0	0	0	0	0	0	0	0	0
41	MF	(England) Charlie Colkett	0	0	0	0	0	0	0	0	0	0	0	0	0	0
42	FW	(England) Tammy Abraham	0 (2)	0	0	0	0	0	0	0	0	0	0 (2)	0	0	0
43	DF	(Canada) Fikayo Tomori	0 (1)	0	0	0	0	0	0	0	0	0	0 (1)	0	0	0
Players who left the club in August/January transfer window or on loan
7	MF	(Brazil) Ramires	7 (5)	2	1	0	2	1	4 (1)	0	1	0	15 (6)	3	1	0
15	DF	(Senegal) Papy Djilobodji	0	0	0	0	0 (1)	0	0	0	0	0	0 (1)	0	0	0
27	GK	(England) Jamal Blackman	0	0	0	0	0	0	0	0	0	0	0	0	0	0
—	MF	(Nigeria) Victor Moses	0	0	0	0	0	0	0	0	0 (1)	0	0 (1)	0	0	0
—	MF	(Colombia) Juan Cuadrado	0 (1)	0	0	0	0	0	0	0	0	0	0 (1)	0	0	0

Last updated: 15 May 2016.
Source: Chelsea F.C.

=== Top scorers ===
The list is sorted by shirt number when total goals are equal.

Rnk	Pos	No.	Player	Premier League	FA Cup	League Cup	Champions League	Community Shield	Total
1	FW	19	(Spain) Diego Costa	12	2	0	2	0	16
2	MF	22	(Brazil) Willian	5	1	0	5	0	11
3	MF	8	(Brazil) Oscar	3	3	0	2	0	8
3	MF	17	(Spain) Pedro	7	0	1	0	0	8
5	MF	4	(Spain) Cesc Fàbregas	5	0	0	1	0	6
5	MF	10	(Belgium) Eden Hazard	4	2	0	0	0	6
7	FW	14	(Burkina Faso) Bertrand Traoré	2	2	0	0	0	4
7	DF	24	(England) Gary Cahill	2	1	0	1	0	4
9	MF	7	(Brazil) Ramires	2	0	1	0	0	3
9	FW	18	(France) Loïc Rémy	1	0	2	0	0	3
11	DF	2	(Serbia) Branislav Ivanović	2	0	0	0	0	2
11	DF	5	(France) Kurt Zouma	1	0	0	1	0	2
11	MF	16	(Brazil) Kenedy	1	0	1	0	0	2
11	MF	21	(Serbia) Nemanja Matić	2	0	0	0	0	2
11	DF	28	(Spain) César Azpilicueta	2	0	0	0	0	2
11	MF	36	(England) Ruben Loftus-Cheek	1	1	0	0	0	2
17	FW	9	(Colombia) Radamel Falcao	1	0	0	0	0	1
17	FW	11	(Brazil) Alexandre Pato	1	0	0	0	0	1
17	MF	12	(Nigeria) John Obi Mikel	0	0	0	1	0	1
17	DF	26	(England) John Terry	1	0	0	0	0	1
Own goals				3	0	0	2	0	5
Total				58	12	5	15	0	90

Last updated: 15 May 2016.
Source: Chelsea F.C.

=== Clean sheets ===
The list is sorted by shirt number when total appearances are equal.

Rnk	No.	Player	Premier League	FA Cup	League Cup	Champions League	Community Shield	Total
1	1	(Bosnia and Herzegovina) Asmir Begović	4	1	0	3	0	8
2	13	(Belgium) Thibaut Courtois	5	0	0	1	0	6
Total			9	1	0	4	0	14

Last updated: 2 April 2016.
Source: Chelsea F.C.

=== Summary ===
Games played	53 (38 Premier League) (2 League Cup) (8 Champions League) (1 Community Shield) (4 FA Cup)
Games won	20 (12 Premier League) (1 League Cup) (4 Champions League) (3 FA Cup)
Games drawn	16 (14 Premier League) (1 League Cup) (1 Champions League)
Games lost	17 (12 Premier League) (3 Champions League) (1 Community Shield) (1 FA Cup)
Goals scored	91 (58 Premier League) (5 League Cup) (15 Champions League) (12 FA Cup)
Goals conceded	67 (53 Premier League) (2 League Cup) (7 Champions League) (1 Community Shield) (4 FA Cup)
Goal difference	24 (+6 Premier League) (+3 League Cup) (+8 Champions League) (−1 Community Shield) (+8 FA Cup)
Clean sheets	14 (9 Premier League) (4 Champions League) (1 FA Cup)
Yellow cards	81 (57 Premier League) (3 League Cup) (15 Champions League) (1 Community Shield) (5 FA Cup)
Red cards	6 (5 Premier League) (1 FA Cup)
Most appearances	(Spain) César Azpilicueta & (Brazil) Willian (49 appearances)
Top scorer	(Spain) Diego Costa (16 goals)
Winning percentage	Overall: 20/53 (37.74%)

Last updated: 15 May 2016.
Source: Chelsea F.C.

== Awards ==
=== Player ===
No.	Player	Award	Month	Source
36	(England) Ruben Loftus-Cheek	Chelsea Young Player of the Year	May	
10	(Belgium) Eden Hazard	Chelsea Goal of the Year	May	
43	(Canada) Fikayo Tomori	Academy Player of the Year	May	
22	(Brazil) Willian	Chelsea Players' Player of the Year	May	
22	(Brazil) Willian	Chelsea Player of the Year	May	
