= Alex Kiwomya =

English footballer

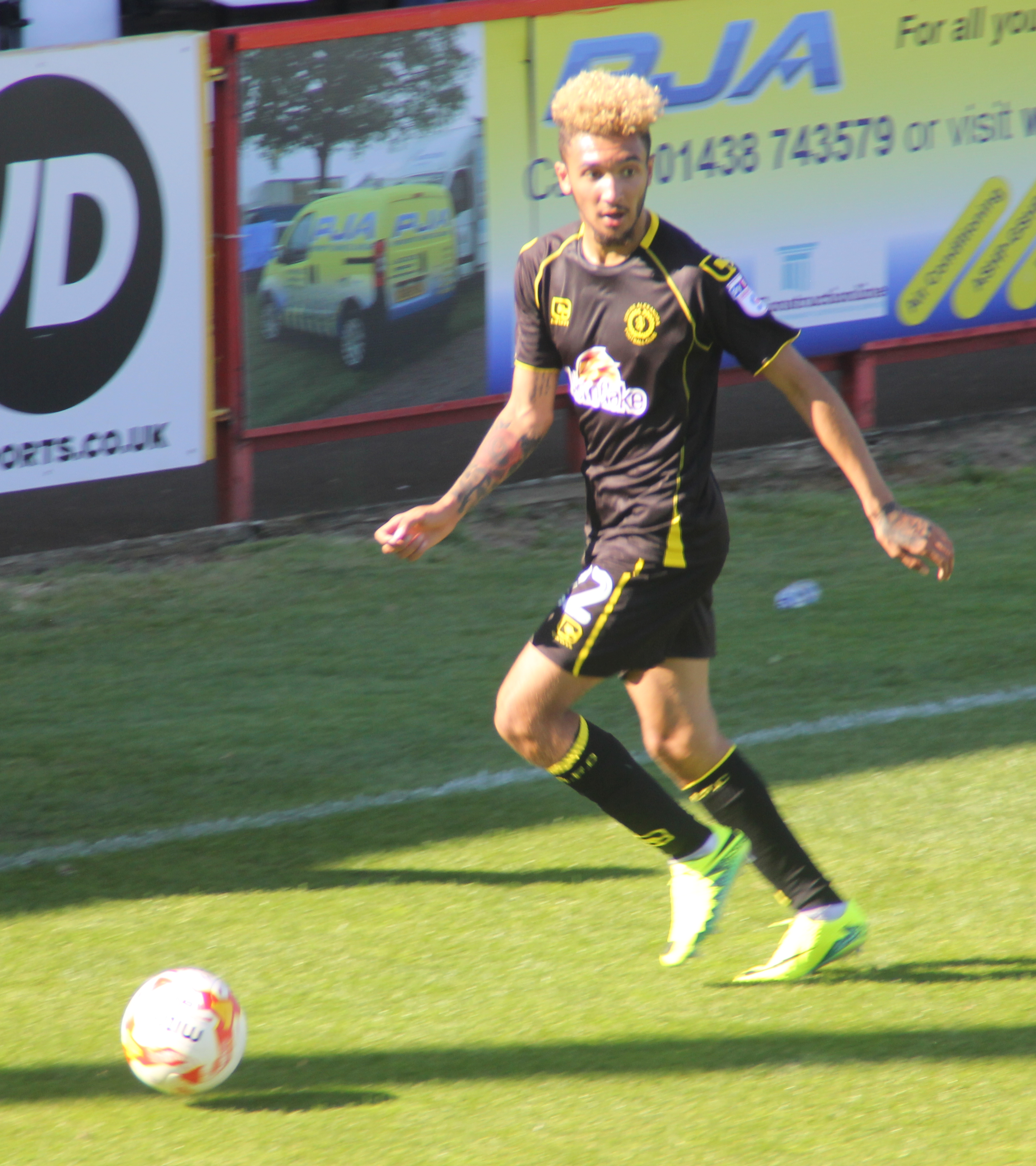
- Kiwomya playing for Crewe in August 2016

Personal information
- Full name: Andrew Alexander Kiwomya
- Date of birth: 20 May 1996 (age 30)
- Place of birth: Sheffield, England
- Height: 5 ft 10 in (1.79 m)
- Positions: Winger; forward

Team information
- Current team: Emley

Youth career
- –2010: Rotherham United
- 2010–2015: Chelsea

Senior career*
Years	Team	Apps	(Gls)
2015–2017	Chelsea	0	(0)
2015	→ Barnsley (loan)	5	(0)
2016	→ Fleetwood Town (loan)	4	(0)
2016–2017	→ Crewe Alexandra (loan)	34	(7)
2017–2020	Doncaster Rovers	16	(1)
2018–2019	→ Chesterfield (loan)	14	(4)
2020	→ Chorley (loan)	5	(0)
2020	Chesterfield	5	(1)
2021	King's Lynn Town	24	(2)
2021–2022	Bruno's Magpies	5	(0)
2022	Macclesfield	5	(1)
2022–2023	Stafford Rangers	34	(2)
2023–2024	Stalybridge Celtic	0	(0)
2024	Farsley Celtic	3	(0)
2024–2026	Warrington Rylands		
2026–	Emley	0	(0)

International career^{‡}
2011	England U16	2	(1)
2012–2013	England U17	8	(1)
2013–2014	England U18	3	(1)
2014–2015	England U19	4	(0)
- * Club domestic league appearances and goals as of 11:08, 11 January 2025 (UTC) ‡ National team caps and goals as of 17:51, 8 August 2015 (UTC)

Andrew Alexander Kiwomya (born 20 May 1996) is an English professional footballer who plays as a winger and forward for Emley.

== Early and personal life ==
Kiwomya was born on 20 May 1996 in Sheffield. He attended Notre Dame High School, Sheffield before joining Chelsea's Youth Academy. He is the son of former professional footballer Andy Kiwomya and the nephew of Chris Kiwomya. He had been a junior athletics champion in the 100m; at the age of 14 he ran the event in 10.98 seconds.

Kiwomya is of English, Jamaican, Ugandan, and Scottish heritage.

Kiwomya was diagnosed with Guillain-Barré syndrome in 2017.

Kiwomya and his girlfriend, Talitha Minnis of Ex on the Beach, have a son born in January 2016.

== Club career ==
=== Chelsea ===
Kiwomya moved from Rotherham United to Chelsea in 2010. After his move to Chelsea, Kiwomya featured in the Under-18s, Under-19s and Under-21s squads.

Although Kiwomya did not play a part in the UEFA Youth League final, Kiwomya collected a winner's medal and celebrated with his teammates for his contributions during the group stage.

In July 2016, Kiwomya signed a one-year extension, staying with the London side until June 2017.

==== Loan spells ====
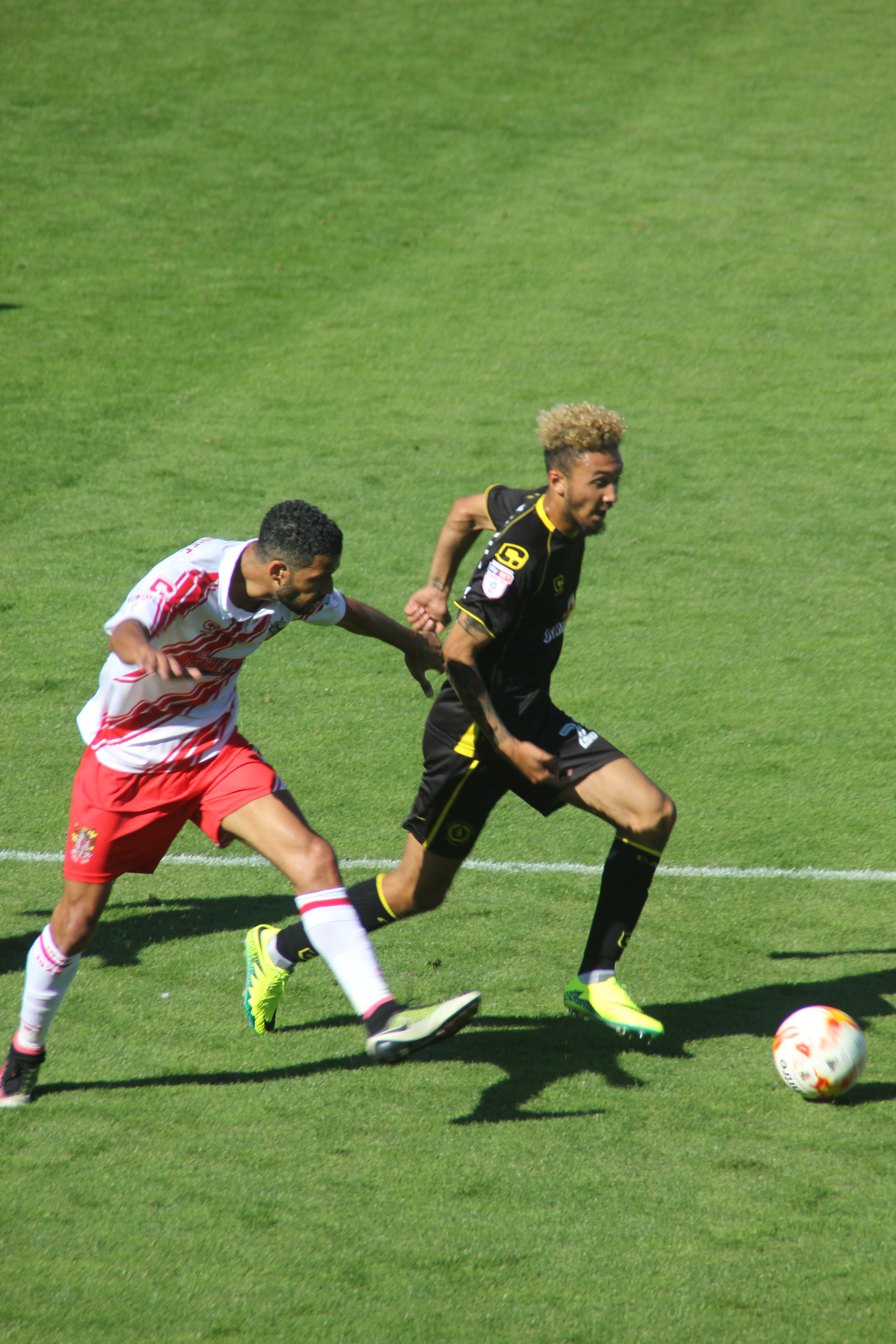
Alex Kiwomya beats Stevenage's Jobi McAnuff just before scoring his first professional goal in a 2-1 Crewe Alexandra win at Stevenage.

He signed a one-month loan deal with Barnsley in January 2015. He was seen as a replacement for Devante Cole, who returned to parent club Manchester City following the expiry of his loan spell. Kiwomya made his senior professional debut with Barnsley, playing 77 minutes in a 2–0 home victory over Yeovil Town. Kiwomya's father Andy had also started career with Barnsley. On 3 February 2015, Barnsley extended Kiwomya's loan deal for a further month, until 3 March 2015. He returned to Chelsea after failing to impress with Barnsley.

On 21 January 2016, Kiwomya joined League One side Fleetwood Town on a one-month loan deal until 20 February 2016. On 23 January 2016, Kiwomya made his debut coming off the bench, replacing David Henen against Doncaster Rovers. On 23 February 2016, Fleetwood decided not to extend his loan and sent him back to his parent-team, Chelsea, after only making four appearances.

On 20 July 2016, Kiwomya joined League Two side Crewe Alexandra on loan until 9 January 2017. On 6 August 2016, Kiwomya made his Crewe debut, replacing George Cooper in the 62nd minute and scoring the second goal in a 2–1 win at Stevenage. On 16 August, Kiwomya made his first start, against Hartlepool United, setting up the first goal and scoring the second in a 3–3 draw. In September 2016, Kiwomya was nominated for Sky Bet League Two Player of the Month award. Kiwomya suffered a dislocated shoulder in a match against Grimsby Town on 17 September; the injury did not require surgery, with Kiwomya due to return to regular training in October. After returning from injury, Crewe's manager Steve Davis said he had approached Chelsea about extending Kiwomya's loan period beyond January 2017, and the loan was extended to the end of the season on 9 January 2017. On 9 May 2017, Crewe announced that Kiwomya would be returning to his parent club.

=== Doncaster Rovers ===
After having tried to sign him during the previous season, on 16 June 2017 it was announced that Kiwomya had joined Doncaster Rovers on a three-year deal. Kiwomya was diagnosed with Guillain-Barré syndrome in 2017.

In October 2018, he joined Chesterfield on loan.

He was transfer-listed by Doncaster at the end of the 2018–19 season. He moved on loan to Chorley in February 2020 for a month.

He was released by Doncaster at the end of the 2019–20 season.

=== Non-league ===
After a trial with Turkish club Fatih Karagümrük, Kiwomya re-signed for Chesterfield, on a permanent basis in October 2020. On 12 December 2020, it was announced that Kiwomya had been released by Chesterfield.

On 5 January 2021 he signed for King's Lynn Town. On 4 June 2021 it was announced that he would be released from the club at the end of the season.

=== Gibraltar ===
In November 2021 Kiwomya moved abroad for the first time, signing for Gibraltar National League side Bruno's Magpies. He made his debut on 20 November, coming on as a substitute in a 3–2 win over Lions Gibraltar.

=== Return to non-league ===
On 4 March 2022, Kiwomya signed for Macclesfield. He then signed for Stafford Rangers, playing 34 games in the NPL Premier Division before a July 2023 move to Stalybridge Celtic.

In June 2024, Kiwomya joined National League North side Farsley Celtic. He departed the club in October 2024. He signed for Warrington Rylands, and later that month scored 5 goals in a Liverpool Senior Cup match.

In August 2026 he signed for Emley.

== International career ==
Kiwomya has represented England at under-16, under-17, under-18, and under-19 levels.

== Playing style ==
Kiwomya was described by Chelsea as "a pacey player who mostly operates as a winger but can play as a central striker", and as "an exciting striker with electric pace."

== Career statistics ==
As of match played 29 October 2019.

Club	Season	Division	League		FA Cup		League Cup		Other		Total	
Club	Season	Division	Apps	Goals	Apps	Goals	Apps	Goals	Apps	Goals	Apps	Goals
Chelsea	2014–15	Premier League	0	0	0	0	0	0	—		0	0
Chelsea	2015–16	Premier League	0	0	0	0	0	0	—		0	0
Chelsea	2016–17	Premier League	0	0	0	0	0	0	—		0	0
Chelsea	Total		0	0	0	0	0	0	0	0	0	0
Barnsley (loan)	2014–15	League One	5	0	0	0	0	0	0	0	5	0
Fleetwood Town (loan)	2015–16	League One	4	0	0	0	0	0	0	0	4	0
Crewe Alexandra (loan)	2016–17	League Two	34	7	2	0	2	0	1	0	39	7
Doncaster Rovers	2017–18	League One	12	1	0	0	0	0	0	0	12	1
Doncaster Rovers	2018–19	League One	3	0	0	0	1	0	0	0	4	0
Doncaster Rovers	2019–20	League One	1	0	0	0	1	0	2	0	4	0
Doncaster Rovers	Total		16	1	0	0	2	0	2	0	20	1
Chesterfield (loan)	2018–19	National League	14	4	3	0	0	0	2	1	19	5
Career total			73	12	5	0	4	0	4	1	86	13

== Honours ==
=== Club ===
Chelsea Reserves

- FA Youth Cup: 2011–12, 2013–14
- Professional Development League: 2013–14
- UEFA Youth League: 2014–15

Macclesfield

- NWCFL Premier Division: 2021–22

=== International ===
England U16

- Victory Shield : 2012
