= Andy Kiwomya =

English footballer

Personal information
- Full name: Andrew Derek Bara Kiwomya
- Date of birth: 1 October 1967 (age 59)
- Place of birth: Huddersfield, England
- Height: 5 ft 9 in (1.75 m)
- Positions: Left winger; forward

Youth career
- Barnsley

Senior career*
| Years | Team | Apps | (Gls) |
| 1985–1986 | Barnsley | 1 | (0) |
| 1986–1989 | Sheffield Wednesday | 0 | (0) |
| 1992–1993 | Dundee | 21 | (1) |
| 1993–1994 | Rotherham United | 7 | (0) |
| 1994 | Halifax Town | | |
| 1994–1995 | Scunthorpe United | 9 | (3) |
| 1995–1997 | Bradford City | 43 | (3) |
| 1997 | → Luton Town (loan) | 5 | (1) |
| 1997 | → Burnley (loan) | 3 | (0) |
| 1997–1998 | Notts County | 2 | (0) |
| 1998 | → Halifax Town (loan) | | |
| 1998 | Cambridge City | | |
| 1998–1999 | Nuneaton Town | | |
| 1999–2000 | Boston United | | |
| 2000–2001 | Ilkeston Town | | |
| 2004 | Stocksbridge Park Steels | | |
| Total | | 91 | (8) |

International career
| 1985 | England U17 | 3 | (0) |
| 1985–1986 | England Youth | 6 | (0) |

Managerial career
- 2015–2016: Sheffield FC
- * Club domestic league appearances and goals

Andrew Derek Bara Kiwomya (born 1 October 1967) is an English professional association football coach and former player. He played as both a left winger and a striker.

== Early life ==
Andy attended St Bede's Grammar School in Heaton, Bradford. He played for the school football team in the Bradford Metropolitan District Schools' Football Association (BMDSFA) league, scoring 10 goals (possibly more as 7 goals are unaccounted for) in the 1982/83 season.

== Playing career ==
Born in Huddersfield, Kiwomya played League football in England and Scotland for Barnsley, Sheffield Wednesday, Dundee, Rotherham United, Halifax Town, Scunthorpe United, Bradford City, Luton Town, Burnley and Notts County.

He later played non-League football for Cambridge City, Nuneaton Town, Boston United, Ilkeston Town and Stocksbridge Park Steels.

== Coaching career ==
He was employed by Huddersfield Town as head performance coach in 2010.

Kiwomya was announced as manager of Sheffield FC in May 2015, succeeding Jordan Broadbent. He stepped down from the managerial role in March 2016, becoming head of youth development.

In April 2019, Kiwomya joined EFL Championship side Leeds United as a coach for their Development Hub for elite player development scholarship.

In December 2021 he became head of club performance at Bradford City, having held previous similar roles at Manchester City and Nottingham Forest. Bradford City manager Derek Adams said he believed Kiwomya's appointment would help improve the team's performances. He left Bradford City in July 2022.

== Personal and later life ==
His son is Alex Kiwomya and his brother is Chris Kiwomya.

He is of Ugandan heritage.

Kiwomya has spoken out publicly about the racist elements of the sport.

In November 2007, Kiwomya took part in a charity match, playing for a Sheffield FC Masters XI against a team of soap stars.

== Honours ==
Bradford City

- Football League Second Division play-offs: 1996
