= 2013–14 UEFA Youth League group stage =

Football tournament group stage

The 2013–14 UEFA Youth League group stage was played from 17 September to 11 December 2013. A total of 32 teams competed to decide the sixteen teams that would advance to the knockout phase of the 2013–14 UEFA Youth League.

== Draw ==
The youth teams of the 32 clubs which qualified for the 2013–14 UEFA Champions League group stage entered the competition.

The 32 teams were drawn into eight groups of four. There was no separate draw held, with the group compositions identical to the draw for the 2013–14 UEFA Champions League group stage, which was held on 29 August 2013 at the Grimaldi Forum in Monaco.

Key to colours
Group winners advanced to the round of 16

Pot 1 Team (Germany) Bayern Munich (Spain) Barcelona (England) Chelsea (Spain) Real Madrid (England) Manchester United (England) Arsenal (Portugal) Porto (Portugal) Benfica	Pot 2 Team (Spain) Atlético Madrid (Ukraine) Shakhtar Donetsk (Italy) Milan (Germany) Schalke 04 (France) Marseille (Russia) CSKA Moscow (France) Paris Saint-Germain (Italy) Juventus	Pot 3 Team (Russia) Zenit Saint Petersburg (England) Manchester City (Netherlands) Ajax (Germany) Borussia Dortmund (Switzerland) Basel (Greece) Olympiacos (Turkey) Galatasaray (Germany) Bayer Leverkusen	Pot 4 Team (Denmark) Copenhagen (Italy) Napoli (Belgium) Anderlecht (Scotland) Celtic (Romania) Steaua București (Czech Republic) Viktoria Plzeň (Spain) Real Sociedad Austria Wien

== Format ==
In each group, teams played against each other home-and-away in a round-robin format. The eight group winners and runners-up advanced to the round of 16.

=== Tiebreakers ===
The teams were ranked according to points (3 points for a win, 1 point for a draw, 0 points for a loss). If two or more teams were equal on points on completion of the group matches, the following criteria were applied in the order given to determine the rankings:

1. higher number of points obtained in the group matches played among the teams in question;
2. superior goal difference from the group matches played among the teams in question;
3. higher number of goals scored in the group matches played among the teams in question;
4. higher number of goals scored away from home in the group matches played among the teams in question;
5. If, after applying criteria 1 to 4 to several teams, two teams still have an equal ranking, criteria 1 to 4 are reapplied exclusively to the matches between the two teams in question to determine their final rankings. If this procedure does not lead to a decision, criteria 6 to 9 apply;
6. superior goal difference from all group matches played;
7. higher number of goals scored from all group matches played;
8. lower disciplinary points total based only on yellow and red cards received during the group stage (red card = 3 points, yellow card = 1 point, expulsion for two yellow cards in one match = 3 points);
9. drawing of lots.

== Groups ==
The matchdays were 17–18 September, 1–2 October, 22–23 October, 5–6 November, 26–27 November and 10–11 December 2013, with the matches played on the same matchday as the corresponding Champions League matches (though not necessarily on the same day, and some matches were played on Mondays and Thursdays). Times up to 26 October 2013 (matchdays 1–3) were CEST (UTC+2), thereafter (matchdays 4–6) times were CET (UTC+1).

=== Group A ===
Pos	Team	Pld	W	D	L	GF	GA	GD	Pts	Qualification	RSO	SHK	LEV	MUN
1	(Spain) Real Sociedad	6	3	1	2	9	6	+3	10	Advance to knockout phase	—	3–2	0–1	0–2
2	(Ukraine) Shakhtar Donetsk	6	2	3	1	9	8	+1	9	Advance to knockout phase	0–0	—	2–2	2–1
3	(Germany) Bayer Leverkusen	6	2	1	3	11	14	−3	7		1–5	1–2	—	3–1
4	(England) Manchester United	6	2	1	3	9	10	−1	7		0–1	1–1	4–3	—

17 September 2013
16:00

Real Sociedad (Spain)	3–2	(Ukraine) Shakhtar Donetsk
Matviyenko 15' (o.g.); Guridi 32'; Bautista 38'	Report	Miranyan 8'; Kovalenko 87'

Campus Realzale Gazteak, San Sebastián
Attendance: 1,200
Referee: Laurent Kopriwa (Luxembourg)
17 September 2013
17:00

Manchester United (England)	4–3	(Germany) Bayer Leverkusen
Wilson 4', 89' (pen.); Pearson 10'; Pereira 71'	Report	Brašnić 27', 29'; Wagener 61'

Salford City Stadium, Manchester
Attendance: 479
Referee: Jakob Kehlet (Denmark)

2 October 2013
13:00

Bayer Leverkusen (Germany)	1–5	(Spain) Real Sociedad
Lapeña 6' (o.g.)	Report	Bautista 15', 21'; Gorosabel 61'; Capilla 76' (pen.); Merquelanz 83'

Ulrich Haberland Stadion, Leverkusen
Attendance: 552
Referee: Sebastian Colţescu (Romania)
2 October 2013
14:00

Shakhtar Donetsk (Ukraine)	2–1	(England) Manchester United
Grimshaw 3' (o.g.); Zubkov 87'	Report	Wilson 76'

RSC Olimpiyskiy, Donetsk
Attendance: 3,000
Referee: Sergey Lapochkin (Russia)

23 October 2013
14:00

Bayer Leverkusen (Germany)	1–2	(Ukraine) Shakhtar Donetsk
Gibaldi 59'	Report	Adamenko 48'; Boryachuk 51'

Ulrich Haberland Stadion, Leverkusen
Attendance: 503
Referee: Denis Scherbakov (Belarus)
23 October 2013
15:00

Manchester United (England)	0–1	(Spain) Real Sociedad
	Report	Odriozola 4'

Salford City Stadium, Manchester
Attendance: 735
Referee: Kevin Clancy (Scotland)

5 November 2013
14:00

Shakhtar Donetsk (Ukraine)	2–2	(Germany) Bayer Leverkusen
Heine 19' (o.g.); Kovalenko 59'	Report	Wagener 90+1'; Rother 90+4'

RSC Olimpiyskiy, Donetsk
Attendance: 4,000
Referee: Michael Tykgaard (Denmark)
5 November 2013
15:00

Real Sociedad (Spain)	0–2	(England) Manchester United
	Report	Wilson 11'; Rothwell 56'

Campus Realzale Gazteak, San Sebastián
Attendance: 1,800
Referee: Markus Hameter (Austria)

27 November 2013
14:00

Bayer Leverkusen (Germany)	3–1	(England) Manchester United
Brašnić 18'; Barendt 29'; Cigaņiks 90+3'	Report	Wilson 49' (pen.)

Ulrich Haberland Stadion, Leverkusen
Attendance: 300
Referee: Igor Pristovnik (Croatia)
27 November 2013
14:00

Shakhtar Donetsk (Ukraine)	0–0	(Spain) Real Sociedad
	Report

RSC Olimpiyskiy, Donetsk
Attendance: 800
Referee: Vitali Meshkov (Russia)

9 December 2013
20:00

Manchester United (England)	1–1	(Ukraine) Shakhtar Donetsk
Fletcher 86'	Report	Zinchenko 77'

Leigh Sports Village, Leigh
Attendance: 1,903
Referee: Thorvaldur Árnason (Iceland)
10 December 2013
15:00

Real Sociedad (Spain)	0–1	(Germany) Bayer Leverkusen
	Report	Tarantino 51' (o.g.)

Campus Realzale Gazteak, San Sebastián
Attendance: 400
Referee: Adrien Jaccottet (Switzerland)

=== Group B ===
Pos	Team	Pld	W	D	L	GF	GA	GD	Pts	Qualification	RMA	CPH	JUV	GAL
1	(Spain) Real Madrid	6	3	2	1	16	8	+8	11	Advance to knockout phase	—	1–1	6–2	4–1
2	(Denmark) Copenhagen	6	2	4	0	11	9	+2	10	Advance to knockout phase	3–2	—	2–2	2–2
3	(Italy) Juventus	6	2	2	2	14	13	+1	8		0–2	2–2	—	3–1
4	(Turkey) Galatasaray	6	0	2	4	5	16	−11	2		1–1	0–1	0–5	—

17 September 2013
15:00

Galatasaray (Turkey)	1–1	(Spain) Real Madrid
Taș 15'	Report	Narváez 16'

Avcılar Belediye Stadyumu, Istanbul
Referee: Lasha Silagava (Georgia)
17 September 2013
15:00

Copenhagen (Denmark)	2–2	(Italy) Juventus
Marin 12' (o.g.); Wohlgemuth 90+4' (pen.)	Report	García 26'; Sakor 62'

Østerbro, Copenhagen
Referee: Nikolaj Hänni (Switzerland)

2 October 2013
15:00

Juventus (Italy)	3–1	(Turkey) Galatasaray
Bnou Marzouk 48'; Gerbaudo 65'; Soumah 79'	Report	Orhan 74'

Gino Pistoni, Ivrea
Referee: Harald Lechner (Austria)
2 October 2013
16:00

Real Madrid (Spain)	1–1	(Denmark) Copenhagen
Fran 45'	Report	Nielsen 63'

Alfredo di Stéfano, Madrid
Attendance: 483
Referee: Kevin Clancy (Scotland)

23 October 2013
14:00

Galatasaray (Turkey)	0–1	(Denmark) Copenhagen
	Report	Kartal 58' (o.g.)

Avcılar Belediye Stadyumu, Istanbul
Referee: Andreas Pappas (Greece)
23 October 2013
16:00

Real Madrid (Spain)	6–2	(Italy) Juventus
Narváez 15', 34', 52', 85' (pen.); Fran 38'; Muñoz 80'	Report	Buenacasa 75'; Soumah 78'

Alfredo di Stéfano, Madrid
Attendance: 900
Referee: Rene Eisner (Austria)

5 November 2013
14:30

Juventus (Italy)	0–2	(Spain) Real Madrid
	Report	Muñoz 36'; Sáez 90+2'

Gino Pistoni, Ivrea
Referee: Petr Ardeleanu (Czech Republic)
5 November 2013
17:00

Copenhagen (Denmark)	2–2	(Turkey) Galatasaray
Finnbogason 29'; Nordam 61'	Report	Taş 18'; Coşkun 76'

Østerbro, Copenhagen
Attendance: 798
Referee: Tore Hansen (Norway)

27 November 2013
14:30

Juventus (Italy)	2–2	(Denmark) Copenhagen
Soumah 38'; Gerbaudo 80'	Report	Nordam 34'; Felfel 51'

Gino Pistoni, Ivrea
Referee: Kevin Azzopardi (Malta)
27 November 2013
16:00

Real Madrid (Spain)	4–1	(Turkey) Galatasaray
Cedrés 15'; Fran 25'; Muñoz 30'; Cerro 54'	Report	Ergün 79'

Alfredo di Stéfano, Madrid
Attendance: 600
Referee: Danilo Grujić (Serbia)

10 December 2013
14:00

Galatasaray (Turkey)	0–5	(Italy) Juventus
	Report	Soumah 15'; Bnou Marzouk 64', 76', 78'; Donis 72'

Avcılar Belediye Stadyumu, Istanbul
Referee: Georgi Kabakov (Bulgaria)
10 December 2013
16:00

Copenhagen (Denmark)	3–2	(Spain) Real Madrid
Felfel 17'; Wohlgemuth 69' (pen.); Mathisen 72'	Report	Sáez 42'; Legaz 59'

Frederiksberg Idrætspark, Frederiksberg
Attendance: 1,852
Referee: Andris Treimanis (Latvia)

=== Group C ===
Pos	Team	Pld	W	D	L	GF	GA	GD	Pts	Qualification	BEN	PAR	AND	OLY
1	(Portugal) Benfica	6	4	2	0	15	5	+10	14	Advance to knockout phase	—	1–1	3–0	0–0
2	(France) Paris Saint-Germain	6	1	4	1	5	7	−2	7	Advance to knockout phase	1–4	—	1–1	1–1
3	(Belgium) Anderlecht	6	1	2	3	8	13	−5	5		3–6	0–1	—	4–2
4	(Greece) Olympiacos	6	0	4	2	3	6	−3	4		0–1	0–0	0–0	—

17 September 2013
16:00

Benfica (Portugal)	3–0	(Belgium) Anderlecht
Rochinha 45+1'; N. Santos 60'; Gomes 90+3'	Report

Caixa Futebol Campus, Seixal
Attendance: 500
Referee: Vlado Glodjović (Serbia)
18 September 2013
13:00

Olympiacos (Greece)	0–0	(France) Paris Saint-Germain
	Report

Karaiskakis Stadium, Piraeus
Attendance: 755
Referee: Ivaylo Stoyanov (Bulgaria)

2 October 2013
15:00

Paris Saint-Germain (France)	1–4	(Portugal) Benfica
Augustin 57'	Report	Rochinha 41'; João Nunes 48'; Baldé 52'; Pereira 89'

Stade de Montbauron, Versailles
Referee: Jonathan Lardot (Belgium)
3 October 2013
18:30

Anderlecht (Belgium)	4–2	(Greece) Olympiacos
Kawaya 37'; Leya Iseka 43', 48', 61'	Report	Vergos 40'; Garefalakis 86'

Stade Fallon, Brussels
Referee: Stephan Klossner (Switzerland)

23 October 2013
16:00

Benfica (Portugal)	0–0	(Greece) Olympiacos
	Report

Caixa Futebol Campus, Seixal
Attendance: 975
Referee: Laurent Kopriwa (Luxembourg)
24 October 2013
16:00

Anderlecht (Belgium)	0–1	(France) Paris Saint-Germain
	Report	Coman 20' (pen.)

Van Roy Stadium, Denderleeuw
Referee: Dennis Antamo (Finland)

6 November 2013
14:30

Paris Saint-Germain (France)	1–1	(Belgium) Anderlecht
Augustin 16'	Report	Kawaya 23'

Stade de Montbauron, Versailles
Referee: Alexander Harkam (Austria)
6 November 2013
18:00

Olympiacos (Greece)	0–1	(Portugal) Benfica
	Report	Guedes 70'

Karaiskakis Stadium, Piraeus
Attendance: 3,867
Referee: Ioannis Anastasiou (Cyprus)

27 November 2013
14:30

Paris Saint-Germain (France)	1–1	(Greece) Olympiacos
Bambock 56' (pen.)	Report	Psychogyios 82'

Stade de Montbauron, Versailles
Referee: Nikola Dabanović (Montenegro)
28 November 2013
19:00

Anderlecht (Belgium)	3–6	(Portugal) Benfica
Kawaya 3'; Bourard 11'; Leya Iseka 78'	Report	Rochinha 23', 25', 28'; Pereira 66'; Baldé 76', 90+4'

Van Roy Stadium, Denderleeuw
Referee: Orel Grinfeeld (Israel)

10 December 2013
16:00

Benfica (Portugal)	1–1	(France) Paris Saint-Germain
Guedes 14'	Report	Augustin 90+3'

Caixa Futebol Campus, Seixal
Attendance: 600
Referee: Carlos del Cerro Grande (Spain)
11 December 2013
18:00

Olympiacos (Greece)	0–0	(Belgium) Anderlecht
	Report

Karaiskakis Stadium, Piraeus
Attendance: 1,100
Referee: Suren Baliyan (Armenia)

=== Group D ===
Pos	Team	Pld	W	D	L	GF	GA	GD	Pts	Qualification	CSKA	MCI	BAY	PLZ
1	(Russia) CSKA Moscow	6	4	1	1	13	4	+9	13	Advance to knockout phase	—	1–1	1–2	5–0
2	(England) Manchester City	6	3	2	1	15	4	+11	11	Advance to knockout phase	1–2	—	6–0	3–0
3	(Germany) Bayern Munich	6	3	1	2	10	10	0	10		0–2	0–0	—	4–0
4	(Czech Republic) Viktoria Plzeň	6	0	0	6	2	22	−20	0		0–2	1–4	1–4	—

17 September 2013
11:30

Viktoria Plzeň (Czech Republic)	1–4	(England) Manchester City
Kratochvíl 51'	Report	Bytyqi 10'; Lopes 31', 63'; Cole 54'

Training Center of FC Viktoria Plzeň, Plzeň
Referee: Yuriy Mozharovsky (Ukraine)
17 September 2013
14:00

Bayern Munich (Germany)	0–2	(Russia) CSKA Moscow
	Report	Georgiyevsky 64'; Borzykh 88'

Sportpark Heimstetten, Heimstetten
Attendance: 500
Referee: Jovan Kaludjerović (Montenegro)

2 October 2013
11:00

CSKA Moscow (Russia)	5–0	(Czech Republic) Viktoria Plzeň
Litvinov 2', 39'; Georgiyevsky 30', 83'; Yefremov 42'	Report

Oktyabr Stadium, Moscow
Attendance: 100
Referee: Yaroslav Kozyk (Ukraine)
2 October 2013
16:00

Manchester City (England)	6–0	(Germany) Bayern Munich
Denayer 6'; Lopes 13', 21', 64' (pen.); Glendon 61'; Cole 72'	Report

Ewen Fields, Hyde
Attendance: 1,487
Referee: Svein-Erik Edvartsen (Norway)

23 October 2013
11:00

CSKA Moscow (Russia)	1–1	(England) Manchester City
Gordiyenko 80'	Report	Cole 73'

Oktyabr Stadium, Moscow
Referee: Eiko Saar (Estonia)
23 October 2013
15:00

Bayern Munich (Germany)	4–0	(Czech Republic) Viktoria Plzeň
Markoutz 11'; Hingerl 25', 41'; Hägler 89' (pen.)	Report

Städtischesstadion, Munich
Referee: Vadims Direktorenko (Latvia)

5 November 2013
11:30

Viktoria Plzeň (Czech Republic)	1–4	(Germany) Bayern Munich
Ruml 60'	Report	Seferings 8', 11', 71'; Gaudino 18' (pen.)

Training Center of FC Viktoria Plzeň, Plzeň
Referee: Ádám Németh (Hungary)
5 November 2013
16:00

Manchester City (England)	1–2	(Russia) CSKA Moscow
Fofana 21'	Report	Golovin 66'; Chernov 78'

Ewen Fields, Hyde
Attendance: 739
Referee: Robert Rogers (Republic of Ireland)

27 November 2013
10:00

CSKA Moscow (Russia)	1–2	(Germany) Bayern Munich
Golovin 2' (pen.)	Report	Eberwein 56'; Hägler 79' (pen.)

Oktyabr Stadium, Moscow
Referee: Aliyar Aghayev (Azerbaijan)
27 November 2013
16:00

Manchester City (England)	3–0	(Czech Republic) Viktoria Plzeň
Cole 22', 25'; Pozo 81'	Report

Ewen Fields, Hyde
Attendance: 823
Referee: Petur Reinert (Faroe Islands)

10 December 2013
11:30

Viktoria Plzeň (Czech Republic)	0–2	(Russia) CSKA Moscow
	Report	Georgiyevsky 8', 67'

Training Center of FC Viktoria Plzeň, Plzeň
Referee: Sergey Tsinkevich (Belarus)
10 December 2013
14:00

Bayern Munich (Germany)	0–0	(England) Manchester City
	Report

Städtischesstadion, Munich
Referee: Ilias Spathas (Greece)

=== Group E ===
Pos	Team	Pld	W	D	L	GF	GA	GD	Pts	Qualification	CHE	SCH	STE	BSL
1	(England) Chelsea	6	6	0	0	18	1	+17	18	Advance to knockout phase	—	1–0	5–0	4–0
2	(Germany) Schalke 04	6	3	1	2	14	5	+9	10	Advance to knockout phase	0–2	—	3–0	5–1
3	(Romania) Steaua București	6	1	2	3	5	15	−10	5		0–4	1–1	—	1–1
4	(Switzerland) Basel	6	0	1	5	4	20	−16	1		1–2	0–5	1–3	—

18 September 2013
14:00

Chelsea (England)	4–0	(Switzerland) Basel
Kadoic 20' (o.g.); Swift 27'; Feruz 67'; Kiwomya 88'	Report

Cobham Training Centre, Stoke d'Abernon
Attendance: 100
Referee: Sándor Andó-Szabó (Hungary)
18 September 2013
15:00

Schalke 04 (Germany)	3–0	(Romania) Steaua București
Koseler 16'; Omerbašić 57'; Multhaup 79'	Report

Stimbergstadion, Oer-Erkenschwick
Attendance: 500
Referee: Gerhard Grobelnik (Austria)

1 October 2013
15:00

Steaua București (Romania)	0–4	(England) Chelsea
	Report	Swift 27', 79'; Kiwomya 51', 88'

Stadionul Mogoşoaia, Mogoșoaia
Attendance: 300
Referee: Aleksei Eskov (Russia)
1 October 2013
15:00

Basel (Switzerland)	0–5	(Germany) Schalke 04
	Report	Omerbašić 11'; Pick 16', 50'; Bodenröder 82', 83'

Youth Campus Basel, Münchenstein
Attendance: 200
Referee: Michael Johansen (Denmark)

22 October 2013
14:00

Schalke 04 (Germany)	0–2	(England) Chelsea
	Report	Baker 73' (pen.); Aké 87'

Stimbergstadion, Oer-Erkenschwick
Attendance: 1,250
Referee: Daniel Stefański (Poland)
22 October 2013
15:00

Steaua București (Romania)	1–1	(Switzerland) Basel
Târnovan 53'	Report	Al. Ajeti 38'

Stadionul Mogoşoaia, Mogoșoaia
Attendance: 150
Referee: Anatolii Zhabchenko (Ukraine)

6 November 2013
15:00

Basel (Switzerland)	1–3	(Romania) Steaua București
Manzambi 43'	Report	Mitriță 62'; Grădinaru 82', 90+2'

Youth Campus Basel, Münchenstein
Attendance: 100
Referee: Gunnar Jarl Jónsson (Iceland)
6 November 2013
16:00

Chelsea (England)	1–0	(Germany) Schalke 04
Baker 17'	Report

EBB Stadium, Aldershot
Attendance: 392
Referee: Mervyn Smyth (Northern Ireland)

26 November 2013
15:00

Basel (Switzerland)	1–2	(England) Chelsea
Kamber 90+2' (pen.)	Report	Baker 60'; Swift 63'

Youth Campus Basel, Münchenstein
Attendance: 150
Referee: Oleksandr Derdo (Ukraine)
26 November 2013
15:00

Steaua București (Romania)	1–1	(Germany) Schalke 04
Grădinaru 2'	Report	L. Sané 26'

Stadionul Mogoşoaia, Mogoșoaia
Attendance: 100
Referee: Dejan Jakimovski (Macedonia)

10 December 2013
20:00

Chelsea (England)	5–0	(Romania) Steaua București
Swift 3'; Feruz 22', 30'; Kiwomya 40'; Gnahore 60'	Report

Cobham Training Centre, Stoke d'Abernon
Attendance: 75
Referee: Ognjen Valjić (Bosnia and Herzegovina)
11 December 2013
14:00

Schalke 04 (Germany)	5–1	(Switzerland) Basel
Koseler 7'; Pick 17', 87'; Albrecht 56' (o.g.); Bodenröder 71'	Report	Sulejmani 32'

Stimbergstadion, Oer-Erkenschwick
Attendance: 100
Referee: Aleksandrs Anufrijevs (Latvia)

=== Group F ===
Pos	Team	Pld	W	D	L	GF	GA	GD	Pts	Qualification	ARS	NAP	DOR	MAR
1	(England) Arsenal	6	2	3	1	12	7	+5	9	Advance to knockout phase	—	4–1	0–0	1–1
2	(Italy) Napoli	6	3	0	3	8	9	−1	9	Advance to knockout phase	2–1	—	1–0	2–0
3	(Germany) Borussia Dortmund	6	2	2	2	10	10	0	8		2–2	2–1	—	5–2
4	(France) Marseille	6	2	1	3	10	14	−4	7		1–4	2–1	4–1	—

18 September 2013
15:00

Marseille (France)	1–4	(England) Arsenal
Iliev 76' (o.g.)	Report	Iwobi 7'; Gnabry 55', 61'; Jebb 78'

Stade Marcel Cerdan, Carnoux-en-Provence
Attendance: 397
Referee: Wim Smet (Belgium)
18 September 2013
15:00

Napoli (Italy)	1–0	(Germany) Borussia Dortmund
Tutino 16' (pen.)	Report

Stadio Augusto Bisceglia, Aversa
Referee: Damir Batinić (Croatia)

1 October 2013
15:00

Borussia Dortmund (Germany)	5–2	(France) Marseille
Knystock 14'; Greshake 21'; Yildiz 62', 73'; Dudziak 84'	Report	Guirassy 68', 87'

Stadion Rote Erde, Dortmund
Attendance: 400
Referee: Thoroddur Hjaltalin (Iceland)
2 October 2013
20:00

Arsenal (England)	4–1	(Italy) Napoli
Akpom 38' (pen.), 79'; Lipman 51', 53'	Report	Rubino 67'

Meadow Park, Borehamwood
Attendance: 484
Referee: John Beaton (Scotland)

22 October 2013
15:00

Marseille (France)	2–1	(Italy) Napoli
Dubois 82'; Guirassy 88'	Report	Palmiero 10'

Stade Marcel Cerdan, Carnoux-en-Provence
Attendance: 448
Referee: Oliver Drachta (Austria)
23 October 2013
20:00

Arsenal (England)	0–0	(Germany) Borussia Dortmund
	Report

Meadow Park, Borehamwood
Attendance: 793
Referee: Arnold Hunter (Northern Ireland)

6 November 2013
15:00

Napoli (Italy)	2–0	(France) Marseille
Tutino 40', 60' (pen.)	Report

Stadio Augusto Bisceglia, Aversa
Referee: Enea Jorgji (Albania)
6 November 2013
16:00

Borussia Dortmund (Germany)	2–2	(England) Arsenal
Gümüştaş 42'; Weber 47'	Report	Lipman 28'; Toral 36'

Montanhydraulik-Stadion, Holzwickede
Referee: Andris Treimanis (Latvia)

25 November 2013
20:00

Arsenal (England)	1–1	(France) Marseille
Olsson 39' (pen.)	Report	Kisaku 35'

Meadow Park, Borehamwood
Attendance: 529
Referee: Alain Bieri (Switzerland)
26 November 2013
15:30

Borussia Dortmund (Germany)	2–1	(Italy) Napoli
Kurt 75', 78'	Report	Tutino 53'

Montanhydraulik-Stadion, Holzwickede
Referee: Elmir Pilav (Bosnia and Herzegovina)

11 December 2013
15:00

Marseille (France)	4–1	(Germany) Borussia Dortmund
Porsan-Clemente 41', 89'; Lopez 43'; Kisaku 71'	Report	Benkarit 88' (pen.)

Stade Marcel Cerdan, Carnoux-en-Provence
Attendance: 253
Referee: Mitja Žganec (Slovenia)
11 December 2013
15:00

Napoli (Italy)	2–1	(England) Arsenal
Rubino 34'; Tutino 70'	Report	Akpom 61'

Stadio Augusto Bisceglia, Aversa
Referee: Radu Marian Petrescu (Romania)

=== Group G ===
Pos	Team	Pld	W	D	L	GF	GA	GD	Pts	Qualification	ATM	AWI	POR	ZEN
1	(Spain) Atlético Madrid	6	4	1	1	17	14	+3	13	Advance to knockout phase	—	2–1	3–2	4–2
2	Austria Wien	6	3	2	1	12	6	+6	11	Advance to knockout phase	3–3	—	3–0	2–1
3	(Portugal) Porto	6	2	2	2	9	10	−1	8		3–1	0–0	—	2–2
4	(Russia) Zenit Saint Petersburg	6	0	1	5	9	17	−8	1		3–4	0–3	1–2	—

18 September 2013
11:00

Austria Wien	3–0	(Portugal) Porto
Zivotic 26'; Prokop 37'; Michorl 55'	Report

Generali Arena, Vienna
Attendance: 1,148
Referee: Ján Valášek (Slovakia)
18 September 2013
12:00

Atlético Madrid (Spain)	4–2	(Russia) Zenit Saint Petersburg
Martínez 23'; Jony 35'; Calero 43'; Ivi 69'	Report	Simonyan 76' (pen.); Gasilin 88'

Ciudad Deportiva Cerro Del Espino, Majadahonda
Attendance: 800
Referee: Alexander Kostadinov (Bulgaria)

1 October 2013
11:00

Zenit Saint Petersburg (Russia)	0–3	Austria Wien
	Report	Zivotic 9'; Horvath 61'; Grubeck 72'

Minor Sport Arena Petrovsky, Saint Petersburg
Attendance: 800
Referee: Jari Järvinen (Finland)
1 October 2013
12:00

Porto (Portugal)	3–1	(Spain) Atlético Madrid
Silva 8', 42'; Graça 26' (pen.)	Report	Ivi 90'

CTFD PortoGaia, Vila Nova de Gaia
Attendance: 410
Referee: Peter Královič (Slovakia)

22 October 2013
11:00

Austria Wien	3–3	(Spain) Atlético Madrid
Grubeck 8'; Koglbauer 23'; Michorl 25'	Report	Sergi 12'; Widni 69' (o.g.); Núñez 90+1'

Generali Arena, Vienna
Attendance: 2,462
Referee: Mitja Žganec (Slovenia)
22 October 2013
12:00

Porto (Portugal)	2–2	(Russia) Zenit Saint Petersburg
Rafael 9'; Silva 38'	Report	Osipov 68'; Kubyshkin 90+5'

CTFD PortoGaia, Vila Nova de Gaia
Attendance: 250
Referee: Andreas Ekberg (Sweden)

6 November 2013
10:00

Zenit Saint Petersburg (Russia)	1–2	(Portugal) Porto
Rebenko 30'	Report	Rafael 47'; Silva 64'

Minor Sport Arena Petrovsky, Saint Petersburg
Referee: Vladimir Vnuk (Slovakia)
6 November 2013
12:00

Atlético Madrid (Spain)	2–1	Austria Wien
Alberto 8'; Martínez 22'	Report	Grubeck 3'

Ciudad Deportiva Cerro Del Espino, Majadahonda
Attendance: 450
Referee: Sven Bindels (Luxembourg)

26 November 2013
10:00

Zenit Saint Petersburg (Russia)	3–4	(Spain) Atlético Madrid
Troyanov 27'; Simonyan 36'; Dolgov 45+1'	Report	Hernández 14'; Ivi 58'; Núñez 85', 88'

Minor Sport Arena Petrovsky, Saint Petersburg
Referee: Tornike Gvantseladze (Georgia)
26 November 2013
12:00

Porto (Portugal)	0–0	Austria Wien
	Report

CTFD PortoGaia, Vila Nova de Gaia
Attendance: 350
Referee: Michael Tykgaard (Denmark)

11 December 2013
11:00

Austria Wien	2–1	(Russia) Zenit Saint Petersburg
Michorl 17'; Zivotic 70'	Report	Dolgov 12'

Generali Arena, Vienna
Attendance: 2,867
Referee: Sergiu Derenov (Moldova)
11 December 2013
12:00

Atlético Madrid (Spain)	3–2	(Portugal) Porto
Hernández 55', 69'; Ivi 80'	Report	Graça 15'; Verdasca 72'

Ciudad Deportiva Cerro Del Espino, Majadahonda
Referee: Nikola Popov (Bulgaria)

=== Group H ===
Pos	Team	Pld	W	D	L	GF	GA	GD	Pts	Qualification	BAR	MIL	CEL	AJX
1	(Spain) Barcelona	6	5	1	0	20	5	+15	16	Advance to knockout phase	—	1–1	3–0	4–1
2	(Italy) Milan	6	3	2	1	13	11	+2	11	Advance to knockout phase	2–6	—	3–1	3–0 (Note: The match was awarded as a 3–0 win for Milan after the match was cancelled due to Ajax's refusal to play over the pitch conditions.)
3	(Scotland) Celtic	6	1	1	4	8	12	−4	4		1–2	1–1	—	4–1
4	(Netherlands) Ajax	6	1	0	5	6	19	−13	3		0–4	2–3	2–1	—

Notes:
17 September 2013
20:00

Barcelona (Spain)	4–1	(Netherlands) Ajax
Quintillà 45+3'; Munir 53', 74'; Ebwelle 84'	Report	Acolatse 19'

Mini Estadi, Barcelona
Attendance: 1,537
Referee: Adrien Jaccottet (Switzerland)
18 September 2013
15:00

Milan (Italy)	3–1	(Scotland) Celtic
Pinato 7', 50' (pen.); Tamás 75'	Report	Lindsay 43'

Stadio Breda, Sesto San Giovanni
Referee: Dumitru Muntean (Moldova)

1 October 2013
15:00

Celtic (Scotland)	1–2	(Spain) Barcelona
Johnstone 52'	Report	Sanabria 14', 83'

Cappielow Park, Greenock
Referee: Neil Doyle (Republic of Ireland)
2 October 2013
19:00

Ajax (Netherlands)	2–3	(Italy) Milan
Vissers 7'; Van den Boomen 84'	Report	Mastalli 52'; Iotti 62'; Rondanini 86'

Sportpark De Toekomst, Ouder-Amstel
Referee: Sascha Amhof (Switzerland)

22 October 2013
15:00

Milan (Italy)	2–6	(Spain) Barcelona
Barišič 16'; Cristante 47'	Report	Munir 20', 77'; Sanabria 22', 72'; Ekpolo 45+1'; Rolón 90+1'

Stadio Breda, Sesto San Giovanni
Referee: Alan Mario Sant (Malta)
22 October 2013
15:00

Celtic (Scotland)	4–1	(Netherlands) Ajax
Thomson 32'; Lindsay 35'; Henderson 43'; Kidd 66' (pen.)	Report	Findlay 50' (o.g.)

Energy Assets Arena, Livingston
Referee: Antti Munukka (Finland)

5 November 2013
17:00

Ajax (Netherlands)	2–1	(Scotland) Celtic
El Ghazi 60', 88'	Report	Thomson 29'

Sportpark De Toekomst, Ouder-Amstel
Referee: Mads-Kristoffer Kristoffersen (Denmark)
5 November 2013
17:45

Barcelona (Spain)	1–1	(Italy) Milan
Ekpolo 79'	Report	Cristante 17'

Mini Estadi, Barcelona
Attendance: 754
Referee: Marco Ferreira (Portugal)

26 November 2013
16:00

Celtic (Scotland)	1–1	(Italy) Milan
McManus 51'	Report	Pinato 88'

Energy Assets Arena, Livingston
Referee: Padraig Sutton (Republic of Ireland)
27 November 2013
19:00

Ajax (Netherlands)	0–4	(Spain) Barcelona
	Report	Moha 2'; Enguene 26'; Munir 70'; Rolón 83'

Sportpark De Toekomst, Ouder-Amstel
Referee: Sergejus Slyva (Lithuania)

10 December 2013
18:00

Barcelona (Spain)	3–0	(Scotland) Celtic
Ekpolo 55'; Álex 77'; Moha 87' (pen.)	Report

Mini Estadi, Barcelona
Attendance: 567
Referee: Chris Reisch (Luxembourg)
11 December 2013
15:15

Milan (Italy)	3–0 Awarded (Note: The match was cancelled due to the refusal of Ajax players to take the field, as they considered the condition of the pitch not sufficient to ensure the safety of the players. The result was irrelevant for the qualification to the knockout phase. The match was subsequently awarded as a 3–0 win for Milan.)	(Netherlands) Ajax
	Report

Stadio Breda, Sesto San Giovanni
Referee: Domagoj Vučkov (Croatia)
