= 2013–14 UEFA Youth League knockout phase =

European football tournament

The 2013–14 UEFA Youth League knockout phase began on 18 February with the round of 16 and concluded with the final on 14 April 2014 at Colovray Stadium in Nyon, Switzerland, to decide the champions of the 2013–14 UEFA Youth League.

Times are CET/CEST, (Note: CET (UTC+1) for dates up to 29 March 2014 (up to quarter-finals), and CEST (UTC+2) for dates thereafter (semi-finals and final).) as listed by UEFA.

== Qualified teams ==
Group	Winners (seeded in round of 16 draw)	Runners-up (unseeded in round of 16 draw)
A	(Spain) Real Sociedad	(Ukraine) Shakhtar Donetsk
B	(Spain) Real Madrid	(Denmark) Copenhagen
C	(Portugal) Benfica	(France) Paris Saint-Germain
D	(Russia) CSKA Moscow	(England) Manchester City
E	(England) Chelsea	(Germany) Schalke 04
F	(England) Arsenal	(Italy) Napoli
G	(Spain) Atlético Madrid	Austria Wien
H	(Spain) Barcelona	(Italy) Milan

== Format ==
Each tie in the knockout phase was played as a single match. If the score was level at the end of normal time, a penalty shoot-out was used to determine the winner (no extra time was played). The mechanism of the draws for each round was as follows:

- In the draw for the round of 16, the eight group winners were seeded, and the eight group runners-up were unseeded. The seeded teams were drawn against the unseeded teams, with the seeded teams hosting the match. Teams from the same group or the same association could not be drawn against each other.
- In the draws for the quarter-finals onwards, there were no seedings, and teams from the same group or the same association could be drawn against each other. The draw also decided the home team for each quarter-final, and the "home" team for administrative purposes for each semi-final and final (which were played on neutral ground).

== Schedule ==
The schedule was as follows.

Round	Draw date	Match date(s)
Round of 16	16 December 2013	18–19 & 25–26 February 2014
Quarter-finals	16 December 2013	11–12 & 18–19 March 2014
Semi-finals	16 December 2013	11 April 2014
Final	16 December 2013	14 April 2014

== Bracket ==
The draw for the knockout phase was held on 16 December 2013.

Round of 16
(Russia) CSKA Moscow	1
(France) Paris Saint-Germain	2
(Spain) Real Madrid	2
(Italy) Napoli	1
(Spain) Atlético Madrid	0
(England) Manchester City	1
(Portugal) Benfica	4
Austria Wien	1
(England) Chelsea	4
(Italy) Milan	1
(Spain) Real Sociedad	1
(Germany) Schalke 04	2
(Spain) Barcelona	4
(Denmark) Copenhagen	1
(England) Arsenal	3
(Ukraine) Shakhtar Donetsk	1

Quarter-finals
(France) Paris Saint-Germain	0
(Spain) Real Madrid	1
(England) Manchester City	1
(Portugal) Benfica	2
(England) Chelsea	1
(Germany) Schalke 04	3
(Spain) Barcelona	4
(England) Arsenal	2

Semi-finals
11 April – Nyon
(Spain) Real Madrid	0
(Portugal) Benfica	4
11 April – Nyon
(Germany) Schalke 04	0
(Spain) Barcelona	1

Final
14 April – Nyon
(Portugal) Benfica	0
(Spain) Barcelona	3

== Round of 16 ==
=== Summary ===
The round of 16 matches were played on 18, 25 and 26 February 2014.

Home team	Score	Away team
Barcelona (Spain)	4–1	(Denmark) Copenhagen
Chelsea (England)	4–1	(Italy) Milan
Real Sociedad (Spain)	1–2	(Germany) Schalke 04
Arsenal (England)	3–1	(Ukraine) Shakhtar Donetsk
CSKA Moscow (Russia)	1–2	(France) Paris Saint-Germain
Benfica (Portugal)	4–1	Austria Wien
Real Madrid (Spain)	2–1	(Italy) Napoli
Atlético Madrid (Spain)	0–1	(England) Manchester City

=== Matches ===
18 February 2014
18:00

Barcelona (Spain)	4–1	(Denmark) Copenhagen
Munir 26', 88'; Rolón 37'; Ekpolo 77' (pen.)	Report	Nielsen 16'

Mini Estadi, Barcelona
Attendance: 821
Referee: Jonathan Lardot (Belgium)

25 February 2014
16:00

Chelsea (England)	4–1	(Italy) Milan
Baker 44', 74'; Boga 53'; Kiwomya 78'	Report	Petagna 81'

Cobham Training Centre, Stoke d'Abernon
Attendance: 150
Referee: Peter Královič (Slovakia)

25 February 2014
19:00

Real Sociedad (Spain)	1–2	(Germany) Schalke 04
Sangalli 54'	Report	Müller 64'; Multhaup 74'

Anoeta, San Sebastián
Attendance: 8,122
Referee: Jari Järvinen (Finland)

25 February 2014
20:00

Arsenal (England)	3–1	(Ukraine) Shakhtar Donetsk
Toral 24'; Olsson 71' (pen.); Gnabry 73'	Report	Boryachuk 44'

Meadow Park, Borehamwood
Attendance: 505
Referee: Robert Rogers (Republic of Ireland)

26 February 2014
15:00

CSKA Moscow (Russia)	1–2	(France) Paris Saint-Germain
Yefremov 49'	Report	Ongenda 19'; Hervé 45+1'

Rodina Stadium, Khimki
Attendance: 600
Referee: Enea Jorgji (Albania)

26 February 2014
17:00

Benfica (Portugal)	4–1	Austria Wien
Carvalho 52'; Baldé 70'; N. Santos 79'; Guedes 90+2'	Report	Kvasina 9'

Caixa Futebol Campus, Seixal
Attendance: 900
Referee: Nikola Dabanović (Montenegro)

26 February 2014
18:00

Real Madrid (Spain)	2–1	(Italy) Napoli
Muñoz 15'; Febas 90+5'	Report	Łasicki 71'

Alfredo di Stéfano, Madrid
Attendance: 1,275
Referee: Andreas Pappas (Greece)

26 February 2014
20:00

Atlético Madrid (Spain)	0–1	(England) Manchester City
	Report	Cole 25'

Ciudad Deportiva Cerro Del Espino, Majadahonda
Attendance: 815
Referee: Tore Hansen (Norway)

== Quarter-finals ==
=== Summary ===
The quarter-final matches were played on 11, 16 and 18 March 2014.

Home team	Score	Away team
Paris Saint-Germain (France)	0–1	(Spain) Real Madrid
Chelsea (England)	1–3	(Germany) Schalke 04
Barcelona (Spain)	4–2	(England) Arsenal
Manchester City (England)	1–2	(Portugal) Benfica

=== Matches ===
11 March 2014
18:00

Paris Saint-Germain (France)	0–1	(Spain) Real Madrid
	Report	Sánchez 72'

Stade Sébastien Charléty, Paris
Attendance: 3,520
Referee: Petr Ardeleanu (Czech Republic)

16 March 2014
14:30

Chelsea (England)	1–3	(Germany) Schalke 04
Swift 65'	Report	Hedlund 6' (pen.); Multhaup 44'; Pick 78'

Cobham Training Centre, Stoke d'Abernon
Attendance: 300
Referee: Arnold Hunter (Northern Ireland)

18 March 2014
18:00

Barcelona (Spain)	4–2	(England) Arsenal
Munir 31'; Traoré 50', 90'; Kaptoum 88'	Report	Gnabry 42'; Akpom 83'

Mini Estadi, Barcelona
Attendance: 2,040
Referee: Alexander Harkam (Austria)

18 March 2014
20:00

Manchester City (England)	1–2	(Portugal) Benfica
Fofana 12'	Report	Guedes 74'; Estrela 82'

Ewen Fields, Hyde
Attendance: 4,014
Referee: Mete Kalkavan (Turkey)

== Semi-finals ==
=== Summary ===
The semi-finals were played on 11 April 2014 at the Colovray Stadium in Nyon, Switzerland.

Team 1	Score	Team 2
Real Madrid (Spain)	0–4	(Portugal) Benfica
Schalke 04 (Germany)	0–1	(Spain) Barcelona

=== Matches ===
11 April 2014
13:00

Real Madrid (Spain)	0–4	(Portugal) Benfica
	Report	Pereira 9'; N. Santos 15' (pen.), 17'; Rochinha 56' (pen.)

Colovray Stadium, Nyon
Attendance: 4,000
Referee: Radu Marian Petrescu (Romania)

11 April 2014
16:30

Schalke 04 (Germany)	0–1	(Spain) Barcelona
	Report	Munir 72'

Colovray Stadium, Nyon
Attendance: 4,000
Referee: Paweł Raczkowski (Poland)

== Final ==
The final was played on 14 April 2014 at the Colovray Stadium in Nyon, Switzerland.

14 April 2014
16:30

Benfica (Portugal)	0–3	(Spain) Barcelona
	Report	Tarín 9'; Munir 33', 88'

Colovray Stadium, Nyon
Attendance: 4,000
Referee: Miroslav Zelinka (Czech Republic)
