= Borja Martínez =

Borja Martínez may refer to:

- Borja Martínez (footballer, born 1994), Spanish football winger
- Borja Martínez (footballer, born 1995), Spanish football midfielder
