= 2013–14 UEFA Youth League =

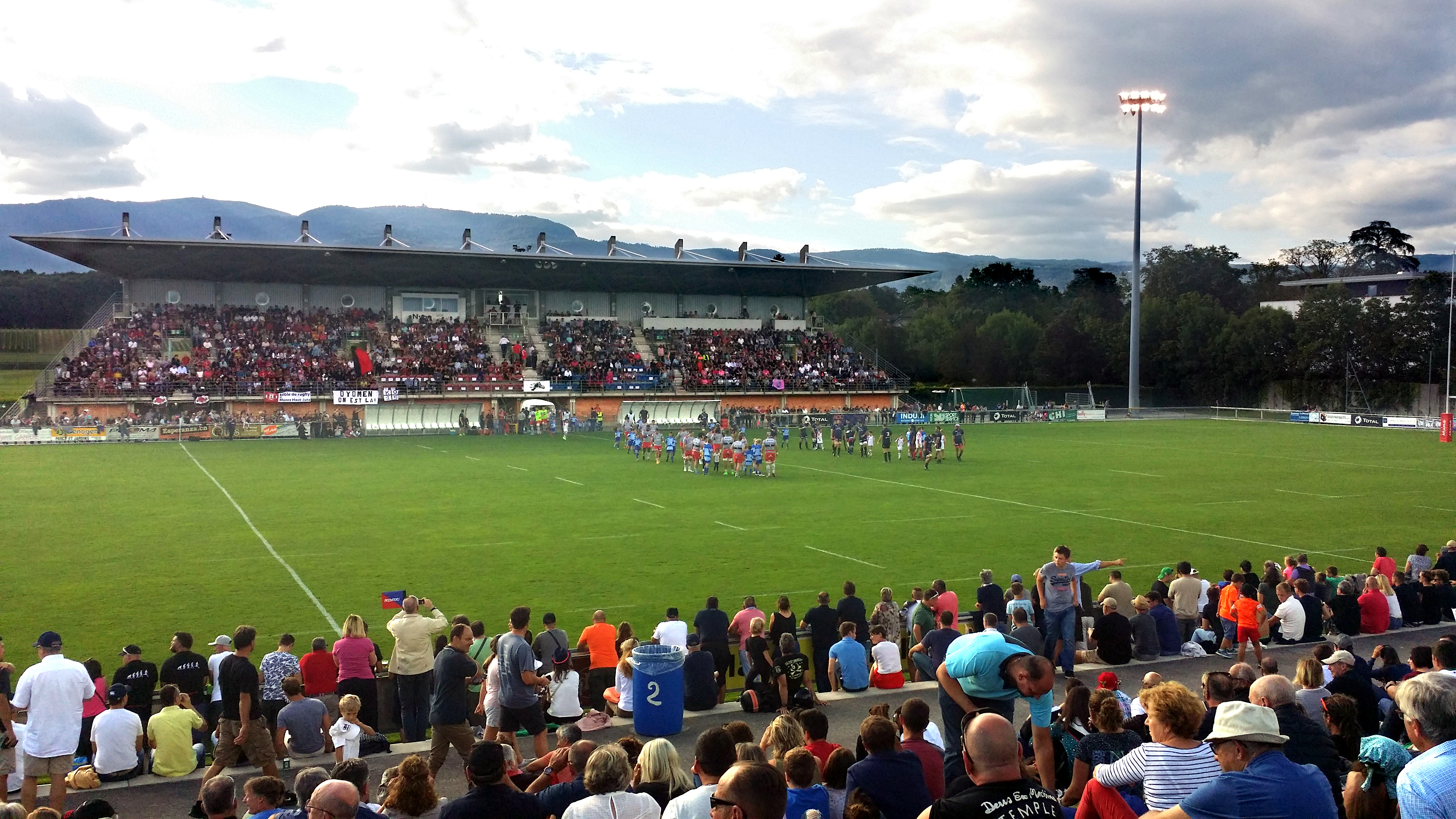
- The Colovray Stadium in Nyon hosted the semi-finals and final.

Tournament details
- Dates: 17 September 2013 – 14 April 2014
- Teams: 32 (from 18 associations)

Final positions
- Champions: (Spain) Barcelona (1st title)
- Runners-up: (Portugal) Benfica

Tournament statistics
- Matches played: 110
- Goals scored: 378 (3.44 per match)
- Attendance: 110,944 (1,009 per match)
- Top scorer(s): (Morocco) Munir (Barcelona); 11 goals

The 2013–14 UEFA Youth League was the first season of the UEFA Youth League, a European youth club football competition organised by UEFA. It was contested by the under-19 youth teams of the 32 clubs qualified for the group stage of the 2013–14 UEFA Champions League.

The final was played on 14 April 2014 at the Colovray Stadium in Nyon, Switzerland, between Benfica and Barcelona. Barcelona won 3–0 and became the first team to lift the Lennart Johansson Trophy, named after UEFA's honorary president.

Players had to be born on or after 1 January 1995.

== Teams ==
The youth teams of the 32 clubs which participated in the 2013–14 UEFA Champions League group stage entered the competition.

Association	Teams
England	Manchester United; Manchester City; Chelsea; Arsenal
Spain	Barcelona; Real Madrid; Atlético Madrid; Real Sociedad
Germany	Bayern Munich; Borussia Dortmund; Bayer Leverkusen; Schalke 04
Italy	Juventus; Napoli; Milan
Portugal	Porto; Benfica
France	Paris Saint-Germain; Marseille
Russia	CSKA Moscow; Zenit Saint Petersburg
Netherlands	Ajax
Ukraine	Shakhtar Donetsk
Greece	Olympiacos
Turkey	Galatasaray
Belgium	Anderlecht
Denmark	Copenhagen
Switzerland	Basel
Austria	Austria Wien
Scotland	Celtic
Czech Republic	Viktoria Plzeň
Romania	Steaua București

== Round and draw dates ==
The schedule of the competition was as follows.

Phase	Round	Draw date	Match date(s)
Group stage	Matchday 1	29 August 2013 (Monaco)	17–18 September 2013
Group stage	Matchday 2	29 August 2013 (Monaco)	1–2 October 2013
Group stage	Matchday 3	29 August 2013 (Monaco)	22–23 October 2013
Group stage	Matchday 4	29 August 2013 (Monaco)	5–6 November 2013
Group stage	Matchday 5	29 August 2013 (Monaco)	26–27 November 2013
Group stage	Matchday 6	29 August 2013 (Monaco)	10–11 December 2013
Knockout phase	Round of 16	16 December 2013 (Nyon)	18–19 & 25–26 February 2014
Knockout phase	Quarter-finals	16 December 2013 (Nyon)	11–12 & 18–19 March 2014
Knockout phase	Semi-finals	16 December 2013 (Nyon)	11 April 2014
Knockout phase	Final	16 December 2013 (Nyon)	14 April 2014

== Group stage ==
Location of teams of the 2013–14 UEFA Youth League.
Brown: Group A; Red: Group B; Orange: Group C; Yellow: Group D; Green: Group E; Blue: Group F; Purple: Group G; Pink: Group H.

The 32 teams were drawn into eight groups of four, with the group compositions determined by the draw for the 2013–14 UEFA Champions League group stage, which was held in Monaco on 29 August 2013. In each group, teams played against each other home-and-away in a round-robin format. The matchdays were 17–18 September, 1–2 October, 22–23 October, 5–6 November, 26–27 November, and 10–11 December 2013, with the matches played on the same matchday as the corresponding Champions League matches (though not necessarily on the same day, and some matches were played on Mondays and Thursdays). The group winners and runners-up advanced to the round of 16.

=== Group A ===
Pos	Team	Pld	W	D	L	GF	GA	GD	Pts	Qualification	RSO	SHK	LEV	MUN
1	(Spain) Real Sociedad	6	3	1	2	9	6	+3	10	Advance to knockout phase	—	3–2	0–1	0–2
2	(Ukraine) Shakhtar Donetsk	6	2	3	1	9	8	+1	9	Advance to knockout phase	0–0	—	2–2	2–1
3	(Germany) Bayer Leverkusen	6	2	1	3	11	14	−3	7		1–5	1–2	—	3–1
4	(England) Manchester United	6	2	1	3	9	10	−1	7		0–1	1–1	4–3	—

=== Group B ===
Pos	Team	Pld	W	D	L	GF	GA	GD	Pts	Qualification	RMA	CPH	JUV	GAL
1	(Spain) Real Madrid	6	3	2	1	16	8	+8	11	Advance to knockout phase	—	1–1	6–2	4–1
2	(Denmark) Copenhagen	6	2	4	0	11	9	+2	10	Advance to knockout phase	3–2	—	2–2	2–2
3	(Italy) Juventus	6	2	2	2	14	13	+1	8		0–2	2–2	—	3–1
4	(Turkey) Galatasaray	6	0	2	4	5	16	−11	2		1–1	0–1	0–5	—

=== Group C ===
Pos	Team	Pld	W	D	L	GF	GA	GD	Pts	Qualification	BEN	PAR	AND	OLY
1	(Portugal) Benfica	6	4	2	0	15	5	+10	14	Advance to knockout phase	—	1–1	3–0	0–0
2	(France) Paris Saint-Germain	6	1	4	1	5	7	−2	7	Advance to knockout phase	1–4	—	1–1	1–1
3	(Belgium) Anderlecht	6	1	2	3	8	13	−5	5		3–6	0–1	—	4–2
4	(Greece) Olympiacos	6	0	4	2	3	6	−3	4		0–1	0–0	0–0	—

=== Group D ===
Pos	Team	Pld	W	D	L	GF	GA	GD	Pts	Qualification	CSKA	MCI	BAY	PLZ
1	(Russia) CSKA Moscow	6	4	1	1	13	4	+9	13	Advance to knockout phase	—	1–1	1–2	5–0
2	(England) Manchester City	6	3	2	1	15	4	+11	11	Advance to knockout phase	1–2	—	6–0	3–0
3	(Germany) Bayern Munich	6	3	1	2	10	10	0	10		0–2	0–0	—	4–0
4	(Czech Republic) Viktoria Plzeň	6	0	0	6	2	22	−20	0		0–2	1–4	1–4	—

=== Group E ===
Pos	Team	Pld	W	D	L	GF	GA	GD	Pts	Qualification	CHE	SCH	STE	BSL
1	(England) Chelsea	6	6	0	0	18	1	+17	18	Advance to knockout phase	—	1–0	5–0	4–0
2	(Germany) Schalke 04	6	3	1	2	14	5	+9	10	Advance to knockout phase	0–2	—	3–0	5–1
3	(Romania) Steaua București	6	1	2	3	5	15	−10	5		0–4	1–1	—	1–1
4	(Switzerland) Basel	6	0	1	5	4	20	−16	1		1–2	0–5	1–3	—

=== Group F ===
Pos	Team	Pld	W	D	L	GF	GA	GD	Pts	Qualification	ARS	NAP	DOR	MAR
1	(England) Arsenal	6	2	3	1	12	7	+5	9	Advance to knockout phase	—	4–1	0–0	1–1
2	(Italy) Napoli	6	3	0	3	8	9	−1	9	Advance to knockout phase	2–1	—	1–0	2–0
3	(Germany) Borussia Dortmund	6	2	2	2	10	10	0	8		2–2	2–1	—	5–2
4	(France) Marseille	6	2	1	3	10	14	−4	7		1–4	2–1	4–1	—

=== Group G ===
Pos	Team	Pld	W	D	L	GF	GA	GD	Pts	Qualification	ATM	AWI	POR	ZEN
1	(Spain) Atlético Madrid	6	4	1	1	17	14	+3	13	Advance to knockout phase	—	2–1	3–2	4–2
2	Austria Wien	6	3	2	1	12	6	+6	11	Advance to knockout phase	3–3	—	3–0	2–1
3	(Portugal) Porto	6	2	2	2	9	10	−1	8		3–1	0–0	—	2–2
4	(Russia) Zenit Saint Petersburg	6	0	1	5	9	17	−8	1		3–4	0–3	1–2	—

=== Group H ===
Pos	Team	Pld	W	D	L	GF	GA	GD	Pts	Qualification	BAR	MIL	CEL	AJX
1	(Spain) Barcelona	6	5	1	0	20	5	+15	16	Advance to knockout phase	—	1–1	3–0	4–1
2	(Italy) Milan	6	3	2	1	13	11	+2	11	Advance to knockout phase	2–6	—	3–1	3–0 (Note: The match was awarded as a 3–0 win for Milan after the match was cancelled due to Ajax's refusal to play over the pitch conditions.)
3	(Scotland) Celtic	6	1	1	4	8	12	−4	4		1–2	1–1	—	4–1
4	(Netherlands) Ajax	6	1	0	5	6	19	−13	3		0–4	2–3	2–1	—

== Knockout phase ==
In the knockout phase, teams played against each other over one match. If scores were level after full-time, the match was decided by penalty shoot-out (no extra time). The mechanism of the draws for each round was as follows:

- In the draw for the round of 16, the eight group winners were seeded, and the eight group runners-up were unseeded. The seeded teams were drawn against the unseeded teams, with the seeded teams hosting the match. Teams from the same group or the same association could not be drawn against each other.
- In the draws for the quarter-finals onwards, there were no seedings, and teams from the same group or the same association could be drawn against each other. The draw also decided the home team for each quarter-final, and the "home" team for administrative purposes for each semi-final and final (which were played on neutral ground).

=== Bracket ===
The draw for the knockout phase was held on 16 December 2013.

Round of 16
(Russia) CSKA Moscow	1
(France) Paris Saint-Germain	2
(Spain) Real Madrid	2
(Italy) Napoli	1
(Spain) Atlético Madrid	0
(England) Manchester City	1
(Portugal) Benfica	4
Austria Wien	1
(England) Chelsea	4
(Italy) Milan	1
(Spain) Real Sociedad	1
(Germany) Schalke 04	2
(Spain) Barcelona	4
(Denmark) Copenhagen	1
(England) Arsenal	3
(Ukraine) Shakhtar Donetsk	1

Quarter-finals
(France) Paris Saint-Germain	0
(Spain) Real Madrid	1
(England) Manchester City	1
(Portugal) Benfica	2
(England) Chelsea	1
(Germany) Schalke 04	3
(Spain) Barcelona	4
(England) Arsenal	2

Semi-finals
11 April – Nyon
(Spain) Real Madrid	0
(Portugal) Benfica	4
11 April – Nyon
(Germany) Schalke 04	0
(Spain) Barcelona	1

Final
14 April – Nyon
(Portugal) Benfica	0
(Spain) Barcelona	3

=== Round of 16 ===
The round of 16 matches were played on 18, 25 and 26 February 2014.

Home team	Score	Away team
Barcelona (Spain)	4–1	(Denmark) Copenhagen
Chelsea (England)	4–1	(Italy) Milan
Real Sociedad (Spain)	1–2	(Germany) Schalke 04
Arsenal (England)	3–1	(Ukraine) Shakhtar Donetsk
CSKA Moscow (Russia)	1–2	(France) Paris Saint-Germain
Benfica (Portugal)	4–1	Austria Wien
Real Madrid (Spain)	2–1	(Italy) Napoli
Atlético Madrid (Spain)	0–1	(England) Manchester City

=== Quarter-finals ===
The quarter-final matches were played on 11, 16 and 18 March 2014.

Home team	Score	Away team
Paris Saint-Germain (France)	0–1	(Spain) Real Madrid
Chelsea (England)	1–3	(Germany) Schalke 04
Barcelona (Spain)	4–2	(England) Arsenal
Manchester City (England)	1–2	(Portugal) Benfica

=== Semi-finals ===
The semi-finals were played on 11 April 2014 at the Colovray Stadium in Nyon, Switzerland.

Team 1	Score	Team 2
Real Madrid (Spain)	0–4	(Portugal) Benfica
Schalke 04 (Germany)	0–1	(Spain) Barcelona

=== Final ===
The final was played on 14 April 2014 at the Colovray Stadium in Nyon, Switzerland.

14 April 2014
16:30

Benfica (Portugal)	0–3	(Spain) Barcelona
	Report	Tarín 9'; Munir 33', 88'

Colovray Stadium, Nyon
Attendance: 4,000
Referee: Miroslav Zelinka (Czech Republic)

== Statistics ==
=== Top goalscorers ===
Rank	Player	Team	Goals	Minutes played
1	(Spain) Munir	(Spain) Barcelona	11	704
2	(Jamaica) Devante Cole	(England) Manchester City	6	578
2	(England) John Swift	(England) Chelsea	6	630
2	(Portugal) Rochinha	(Portugal) Benfica	6	732
5	(Germany) Florian Pick	(Germany) Schalke 04	5	503
5	(Italy) Gennaro Tutino	(Italy) Napoli	5	520
5	(Colombia) Juanjo Narváez	(Spain) Real Madrid	5	523
5	(Portugal) Marcos Lopes	(England) Manchester City	5	530
5	(England) James Wilson	(England) Manchester United	5	540
5	(Russia) Svyatoslav Georgievskiy	(Russia) CSKA Moscow	5	553
5	(England) Alex Kiwomya	(England) Chelsea	5	695
5	(England) Lewis Baker	(England) Chelsea	5	720

=== Top assists ===
Rank	Player	Team	Assists	Minutes played
1	(Spain) Munir	(Spain) Barcelona	5	704
1	(Portugal) Rochinha	(Portugal) Benfica	5	732
3	(Cameroon) Lionel Enguene	(Spain) Barcelona	4	826
