= FCSB Training Centre =

Sports complex in Bucharest, Romania

FCSB Training Center
- Interactive map of FCSB Training Center
- Address: Sos. Drumul Leordeni 106
- Location: Bucharest, Romania
- Coordinates: 44°20′29.0″N 26°08′59.5″E
- Owner: FCSB
- Operator: FCSB; FCSB II; FCSB Academy
- Capacity: 1,000 seats
- Surface: Grass; Artificial turf

Construction
- Opened: 2017

Tenants
- FCSB (2017–present); FCSB II (2017–present)

FCSB Training Center, also known as FCSB Training Center, is a sports complex in Bucharest, Romania. It is currently used only for football matches, is the home ground of FCSB II and FCSB Academy and also used by FCSB for trainings. The football complex was built by George Becali (owner of FCSB) on the place of the former FCSB Concrete Plant, after his club was kicked out from Steaua Stadium and Ghencea Sports Complex due to the conflict with Ministry of National Defence and CSA Steaua București. The football complex has 4 grounds (3 with a grass pitch and 1 with an artificial turf) and holds 1,000 people.
