= FCSB U19 =

FCSB Youth Sector
- Full name: Football Club FCSB Youth Sector
- Nicknames: Roș-Albaștrii (The Red and Blues)
- Short name: FCSB Youth
- Founded: 7 June 1947; 79 years ago
- Ground: Baza Sportivă ARCOM
- Capacity: 1000
- President: Helmut Duckadam
- Head coach: Corneliu Ionescu
- League: Liga Elitelor
Home colours	Away colours

FC FCSB Youth Sector is the youth set-up of Romanian professional football club FCSB in the UEFA Youth League.The under-19 team plays in the Liga Elitelor.

They also participated in the 2013–14 UEFA Youth League edition, it consists of mainly players under-19 from the youth sector.

== Players ==
=== Current squad ===
As of 10 August 2015

Note: Flags indicate national team as defined under FIFA eligibility rules; some limited exceptions apply. Players may hold more than one non-FIFA nationality.

No.	Pos.	Nation	Player
1	GK	ROU	Octavian Marian Bucină
12	GK	ROU	Marian Vîrtej
—	DF	ROU	Marius Pătru
2	DF	ROU	Florin Marin
4	DF	ROU	Petruț Vlad
3	DF	ROU	Lupescu
5	MF	ROU	Gabriel Cardaș
8	MF	ROU	Alin Adrian Gheorghe
12	MF	ROU	Alexandru Ghinea
14	MF	ROU	Florin Ion
16	MF	ROU	Ionuț Ion
—	MF	ROU	Laurențiu Lupu
—	MF	ROU	Andrei Ionuț Țandără
—	MF	ROU	Fabrizio Voicu

No.	Pos.	Nation	Player
—	MF	ROU	Simion
—	MF	ROU	Costin Constantinescu
—	MF	ROU	Constantin Bustei
—	MF	ROU	Mădălin Mustață
—	MF	ROU	Marian Obreja
—	MF	ROU	Florin Matei
—	MF	ROU	Andrei Nicolae
—	MF	ROU	Marius Polgatu
—	MF	ROU	Robert Perlea-Baltag
—	MF	ROU	Antonio Popa
10	FW	ROU	Robert Dumitrache
11	FW	ROU	Junior Măcriș
9	FW	ALB	Franc Bakallli
—		ROU	Laurențiu Moldovan

=== Out on loan ===
Note: Flags indicate national team as defined under FIFA eligibility rules; some limited exceptions apply. Players may hold more than one non-FIFA nationality.

No.	Pos.	Nation	Player
—	MF	ROU	Andrei Gavrilă (on loan at Academica Clinceni)
