= Mads Nordam =

Danish footballer (born 1995)

Personal information
- Full name: Mads Nordam
- Date of birth: 14 May 1995 (age 31)
- Place of birth: Copenhagen, Denmark
- Height: 1.97 m (6 ft 6 in)
- Position: Centre back

Team information
- Current team: Næstved BK
- Number: 21

Youth career
- FC Copenhagen

Senior career*
Years	Team	Apps	(Gls)
2014–2017	Lyngby BK	33	(1)
2017–2018	Fremad Amager	26	(0)
2018–	Næstved BK	1	(0)

International career
2011	Denmark U-16	1	(0)
2012	Denmark U-17	4	(0)
2012–2013	Denmark U-18	5	(0)
2013–2014	Denmark U-19	11	(1)
2014	Denmark U-20	1	(1)
- * Club domestic league appearances and goals as of 1 October 2018

Mads Nordam (born 14 May 1995) is a Danish footballer who plays for the Danish 1st Division club Næstved BK.

== Career ==
=== Lyngby Boldklub ===
On 5 July 2014 it was announced, that Lyngby Boldklub had signed Nordam from the youth sector of F.C. Copenhagen.

=== Fremad Amager ===
On 22 December 2016 Lyngby confirmed, that Nordam had signed a contract with Danish 1st Division-side Fremad Amager.
