= Munir El Haddadi =

Morocco international footballer (born 1995)

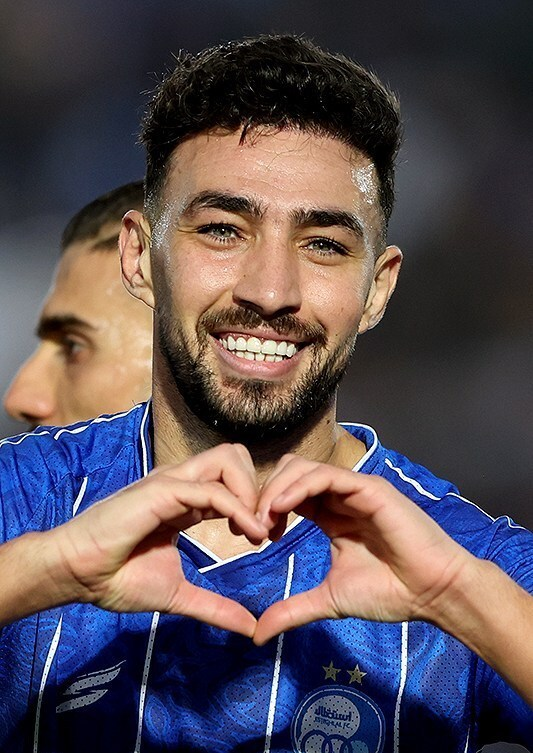
- Munir with Esteghlal in 2025

Personal information
- Full name: Munir El Haddadi Mohamed
- Date of birth: 1 September 1995 (age 31)
- Place of birth: El Escorial, Spain
- Height: 1.75 m (5 ft 9 in)
- Positions: Forward; right winger

Team information
- Current team: Albacete
- Number: 16

Youth career
- 2007–2009: Galapagar
- 2009–2010: Santa Ana
- 2010–2011: Atlético Madrid
- 2010–2011: → Rayo Majadahonda (loan)
- 2011–2014: Barcelona

Senior career*
Years	Team	Apps	(Gls)
2013–2015	Barcelona B	28	(8)
2014–2018	Barcelona	33	(5)
2016–2017	→ Valencia (loan)	33	(6)
2017–2018	→ Alavés (loan)	33	(10)
2019–2022	Sevilla	77	(16)
2022–2023	Getafe	28	(3)
2023–2024	Las Palmas	38	(3)
2024–2025	Leganés	25	(4)
2025–2026	Esteghlal	18	(3)
2026–	Albacete	0	(0)

International career^{‡}
2014	Spain U19	4	(6)
2014–2016	Spain U21	16	(10)
2014	Spain	1	(0)
2021–2022	Morocco	11	(2)
- * Club domestic league appearances and goals as of 27 February 2026 ‡ National team caps and goals as of 26 February 2024

Munir El Haddadi Mohamed (Arabic: مُنِير الْحَدَّادِي مُحَمَّد; born 1 September 1995), known simply as Munir, is a professional footballer who plays as a forward or right winger for Albacete. Born in Spain, he played for Spain and Morocco at senior international level.

Munir began his career in the youth ranks of Atlético Madrid, before transferring to Barcelona in 2011, where he won the 2013–14 UEFA Youth League. He made his debut for the B-team in March 2014, and scored in his first match for the senior team in August of that year, at the start of a season in which they won the treble. The following year, he was one of five top scorers in the Copa del Rey, which his team won. He also played in La Liga on loan at Valencia and Alavés, and permanently at Sevilla, Getafe, Las Palmas and Leganés, winning the UEFA Europa League with Sevilla in 2020.

Munir made his full debut for the Spain national team in 2014. In 2021, he chose to represent Morocco at international level, being selected for the 2021 Africa Cup of Nations.

== Early life ==
Munir was born in El Escorial, Madrid, and grew up in nearby Galapagar on a street likened to a "Little Morocco" by El Mundo. His Moroccan father, Mohamed El Haddadi Arbrqui, moved to Spain in a fishing boat at age 18 and worked as a chef. His mother, Saida Mohamed Haddou, hails from the Spanish autonomous city of Melilla on the north coast of Africa; she is a former kitchen hand who later looked after Munir's three siblings. Up to the age of 14, Munir was a fan of Real Madrid.

Munir's younger brother Suleiman is also a footballer and a forward. Both trained together at Leganés in 2024, despite his brother being mainly a member of the youth sides.

== Club career ==
=== Early career ===
After starting at Galapagar and DAV Santa Ana, Munir scored 32 goals in 29 matches playing for CF Rayo Majadahonda's Cadete A team, on loan from Atlético Madrid, after impressing during a trial in 2010. However, both Atlético and Real Madrid turned down the opportunity to bring him into their ranks. As a result, he attracted interest from a number of sides such as Manchester City, but signed for Barcelona's youth academy the following summer.

=== Barcelona ===
Munir made his UEFA Youth League debut with the Juvenil side against Ajax U19, where he scored two goals. He scored braces against Milan U19 and Copenhagen U19, finishing the tournament scoring 11 goals in 10 matches. He scored a brace in the final against Benfica U19. On 3 March 2014, he extended his Barça contract until June 2017.

After being an unused substitute against Tenerife and Deportivo de La Coruña, Munir made his professional debut for Barcelona B on 2 March 2014 in a 1–2 away win against Mallorca in the second division, coming as a 72nd-minute substitute for Sandro. He scored his first goal as a senior player in a 2–1 home win against Girona on 19 April.

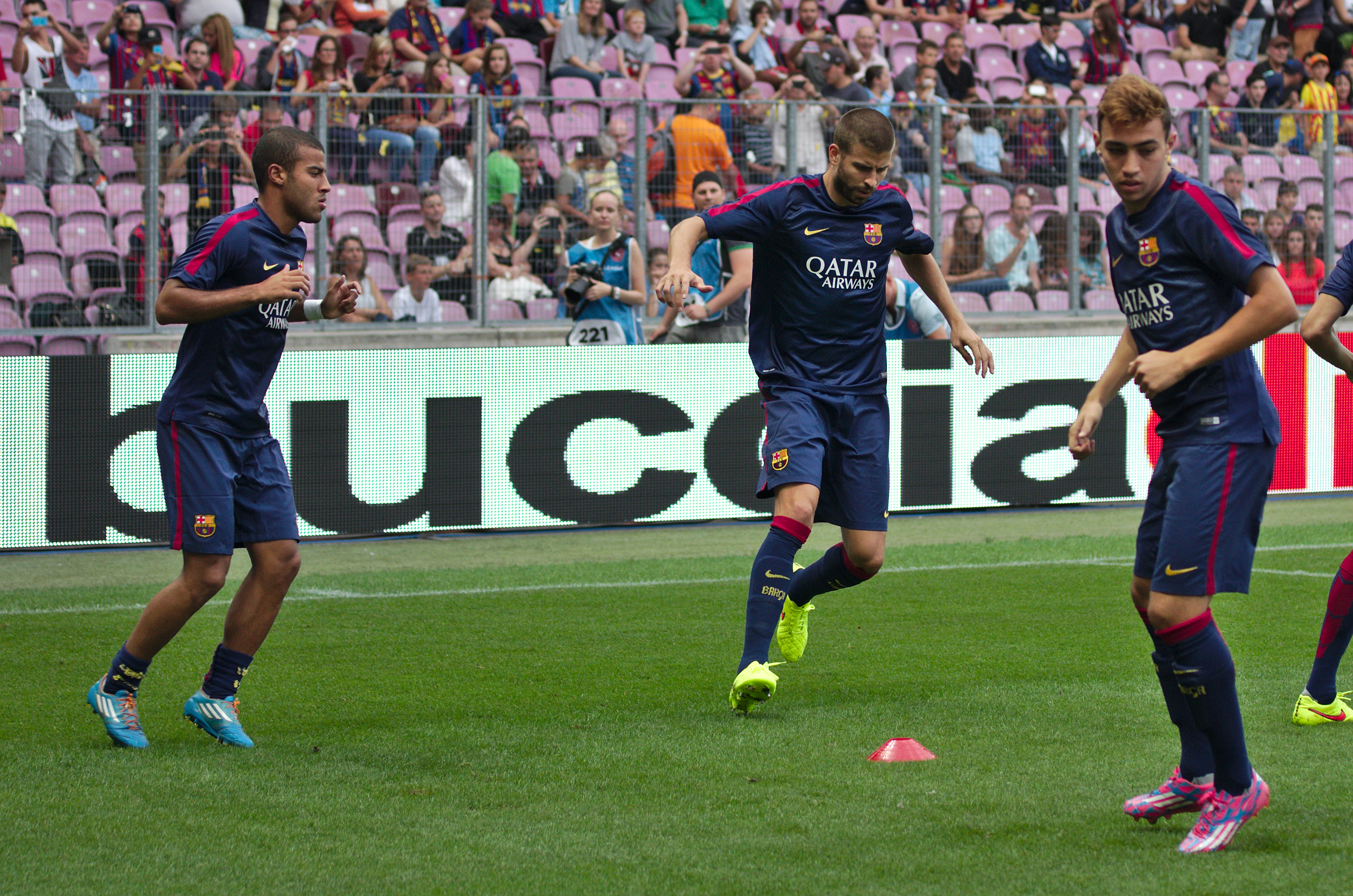
Rafinha, Gerard Piqué and Munir (right) warming up for Barcelona in August 2014 before the fixture against Napoli.

On 24 August 2014, Munir made his official debut for the first team in La Liga, against Elche at Camp Nou. He started the match and scored the second goal of an eventual 3–0 win before being substituted after 67 minutes for Pedro. Eight days short of his 19th birthday, he became Barcelona's third-youngest goalscorer after Bojan and Lionel Messi. Munir was a nominee for the 2014 Golden Boy Award.

On 22 February 2015, Munir was sent off for two bookings in Barcelona B's 0–1 defeat at Llagostera, as the season ended with relegation to Segunda División B. He played three matches apiece in Barcelona's successful runs in the Copa del Rey and UEFA Champions League, but was not included in the matchday squads for either final, becoming the first Moroccan to win the Champions League.

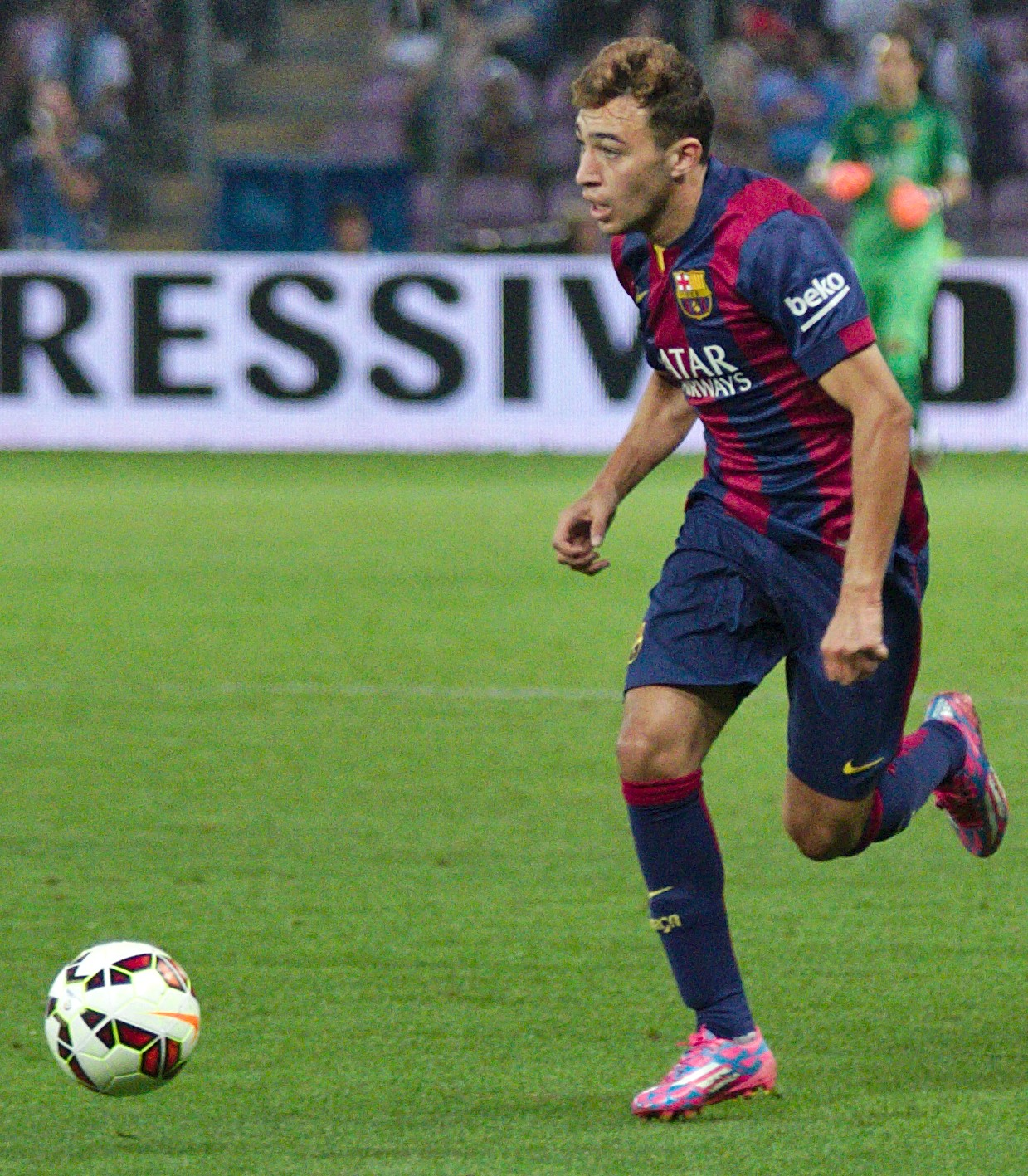
Munir playing for Barcelona in 2014

Munir was an unused substitute for their 5–4 win over Sevilla in the 2015 UEFA Super Cup on 11 August. On 2 December, he scored his first Barcelona goals since his debut, scoring two in a 6–1 win over Villanovense as Barcelona advanced by the same score on aggregate in the domestic cup. On 17 December, starting due to Messi and Neymar's injuries in the semi-finals of the 2015 FIFA Club World Cup in Yokohama, Munir won a penalty kick when fouled by Guangzhou Evergrande Taobao's Huang Bowen, from which Luis Suárez finished his hat-trick to send Barcelona into the final, 3–0. The South American duo returned for the final, which Barcelona won 3–0 against River Plate with Munir unused.

On 13 January 2016, profiting from Suárez's suspension, Munir scored both goals in a cup win at city rivals Espanyol, putting Barcelona into the quarter-finals 6–1 on aggregate. He was unused for the final, a 2–0 extra-time win over Sevilla on 22 May, but with five goals was one of as many players to finish as the tournament's top scorer, among them Messi and Suárez.

On 14 August 2016, Munir came on as a substitute in the 76th-minute and scored to double Barcelona's lead over Sevilla in the 2016 Supercopa de España first leg to give Barcelona a lead of two goals in the second leg.

==== Loan to Valencia ====
On 30 August 2016, Munir moved to fellow La Liga club Valencia on a season-long loan. He was handed the number 9 previously worn by Paco Alcácer, who had moved in the opposite direction. Munir made his debut on 11 September, replacing Santi Mina after 63 minutes of a home game against Real Betis, and his rebounded header was scored by Ezequiel Garay in a 2–3 defeat. On 22 October, he scored his first goal for Los Che, coming on at half-time for Martín Montoya and equalising at the Mestalla against his parent club in a loss by the same score.

==== Loan to Alavés ====
On 1 September 2017, Munir joined Deportivo Alavés on a season-long loan deal. He made his debut nine days later in a 1–0 loss at Celta de Vigo, replacing Enzo for the final 33 minutes. On 30 September he scored his first goal for the Basques, opening a 2–1 win at UD Levante. In the reverse fixture the following 1 March, he was sent off for diving in a 1–0 win at the Mendizorrotza Stadium.

=== Sevilla ===
Munir was offered the chance to renew his contract with Barcelona before its expiration in the summer, but refused to do so. Barcelona assured him that he would not play for the club again, and coach Ernesto Valverde said "it would be for the best" if he was sold in January 2019. Several clubs from England and italy were interested in the forward, but, on 11 January, Sevilla signed him for a fee of around €1 million.

On 13 January, Munir made his Sevilla debut in a 2–0 loss at Athletic Bilbao, replacing Roque Mesa for the final 12 minutes. He scored his first goals in March, one in each leg of a Europa League last-16 tie against SK Slavia Prague, who nonetheless won 6–5 on aggregate, and finished the league season with five goals in 16 games including in a 2–0 win against Athletic on the final day to qualify for the continental tournament again.

Munir scored a hat-trick on 7 November 2019 in a 5–2 Europa League group win at F91 Dudelange, which put his team through to the last 32 and brought his tally in the competition to five.

On 24 November 2020, Munir scored his first Champions League goal in a 2–1 away win over Krasnodar in the 2020–21 season; that goal came in stoppage time to grant his team a place in the knockout stages.

=== Getafe ===
On 31 August 2022, Munir moved to fellow top tier side Getafe. He played 28 league games and three in the Copa del Rey, scoring seven goals and making one assist, while becoming the third Moroccan to 200 La Liga games.

=== Las Palmas ===
On 30 July 2023, recently-promoted to La Liga side Las Palmas announced the free signing of Munir on a one-year contract. Against Celta Vigo on 2 October, he played his 212th La Liga game, and overtook Noureddine Naybet's record for a Moroccan. In his one season in the Canary Islands, he played 39 games over all competitions, scored four goals and assisted two.

=== Leganés ===
On 22 August 2024, Munir signed a two-year deal with Leganés also in the first division. He netted his first goal for Leganés on 2 November in a 4–3 defeat to Girona, and equalled a record held by Carlos Aranda, Roberto Soldado, and Miquel Soler of scoring for seven different La Liga clubs. Munir scored a late equaliser in a 3–3 home draw with Alavés on 15 February, and was sent off in added time for striking compatriot Abdel Abqar; he received his first red card since one for Alavés in March 2018, and was banned for three games. He played 29 games and scored seven goals, but was released one year early in June 2025 following their relegation, and was then offered a two-year deal to return to Alavés.

=== Esteghlal ===
On 6 September 2025, it was announced that El Haddadi had agreed to join Esteghlal in the Persian Gulf Pro League on a two-year contract. On 1 March 2026, he said that, amid the outbreak of the Israeli–United States strikes on Iran, he had left Tehran by road for Turkey.

=== Albacete ===
On 20 August 2026, Munir returned to Spain and its second division after signing a two-year deal with Albacete Balompié.

== International career ==
=== Spain ===
Munir was born and raised in Spain, the son of a Moroccan father, and was eligible to represent either nation internationally. It was rumoured Qatar had offered Munir a financial deal to take that country's nationality and represent the nation, which was set to host the 2022 FIFA World Cup.

On 29 August 2014, Munir was called up for the first time as one of 21 players for Albert Celades' Spain under-21 team to face Hungary and Austria in September. However, after an injury to Diego Costa, Vicente del Bosque called Munir up to the senior squad for the first time ahead of a UEFA Euro 2016 qualifier against Macedonia on 8 September. He made his debut in that match, replacing Koke for the final 13 minutes of a 5–1 victory at the Estadi Ciutat de València. He said after the match he never considered playing for Morocco.

=== Request to change teams ===
In June 2017, it was reported Munir and the Royal Moroccan Football Federation (FRMF) had contacted FIFA to change his allegiance to Morocco. However, a FIFA spokesman denied any contact and said the player was ineligible for a switch. On Munir and the FRMF's request, the Court of Arbitration for Sport began debating FIFA's rules on switching allegiances in April 2018. His appeal to represent Morocco was denied on 14 May.

On 1 October 2020, following a rule change by FIFA that allowed a player to change their national team provided they had made three or fewer appearances in qualifiers before the age of 21, Munir once again attempted to switch from Spain to Morocco and was called up to their national team. Nevertheless, this switch was also rejected by FIFA, on the grounds that Munir had played for the Spain U21 team in September 2016, after turning 21. On 28 January 2021, FIFA published the eligibility requirements for national teams, and Munir received the green light to represent Morocco, as he played once for Spain before he turned 21.

=== Morocco ===
Munir made his debut for Morocco on 26 March 2021, playing the full 90 minutes as the team drew 0–0 away to neighbouring Mauritania to qualify for the 2021 Africa Cup of Nations. Four days later at the Prince Moulay Abdellah Stadium, he scored the only goal of the game against Burundi.

Munir was called up for the final tournament, held in January 2022 in Cameroon. After two substitute appearances, he started in the quarter-finals, a 2–1 extra-time loss to Egypt.

== Style of play ==
As a child, Munir idolised Messi and Moroccan international Adel Taarabt. A report from FourFourTwo magazine noted his composure on the ball, tricks, speed and highlighted his finishing ability and set-pieces; his ability with his weaker right foot was criticised.

After his goalscoring debut, Barcelona manager Luis Enrique praised Munir as a player whose effort in training matches that on the pitch, but warned against getting carried away with his performance.

== Career statistics ==
=== Club ===
As of match played 27 February 2026

Appearances and goals by club, season and competition
Club	Season	League			Copa del Rey		Continental		Other		Total	
Club	Season	Division	Apps	Goals	Apps	Goals	Apps	Goals	Apps	Goals	Apps	Goals
Barcelona B	2013–14	Segunda División	11	4	—		—		—		11	4
Barcelona B	2014–15	Segunda División	17	4	—		—		—		17	4
Barcelona B	Total		28	8	—		—		—		28	8
Barcelona	2014–15	La Liga	10	1	3	0	3 (Note: All appearances in UEFA Champions League)	0	—		16	1
Barcelona	2015–16	La Liga	15	3	5	5	4	0	2 (Note: One appearance in Supercopa de España, one appearance in FIFA Club World Cup)	0	26	8
Barcelona	2016–17	La Liga	1	0	0	0	0	0	2 (Note: All appearances in Supercopa de España)	1	3	1
Barcelona	2018–19	La Liga	7	1	2	1	2	0	0	0	11	2
Barcelona	Total		33	5	10	6	9	0	4	1	56	12
Valencia (loan)	2016–17	La Liga	33	6	3	1	—		—		36	7
Alavés (loan)	2017–18	La Liga	33	10	4	4	—		—		37	14
Sevilla	2018–19	La Liga	16	5	1	0	3 (Note: All appearances in UEFA Europa League)	2	0	0	20	7
Sevilla	2019–20	La Liga	21	5	2	0	9	5	—		32	10
Sevilla	2020–21	La Liga	24	4	6	0	6	1	0	0	36	5
Sevilla	2021–22	La Liga	16	2	2	0	7 (Note: Four appearances in UEFA Champions League, three appearances and one goal in UEFA Europa League)	1	—		25	3
Sevilla	Total		77	16	11	0	25	9	0	0	113	25
Getafe	2022–23	La Liga	28	3	3	4	—		—		31	7
Las Palmas	2023–24	La Liga	38	3	1	1	—		—		39	4
Leganés	2024–25	La Liga	25	4	4	3	—		—		29	7
Esteghlal	2025–26	Persian Gulf Pro League	18	3	2	0	8	1	0	0	28	4
Career total			313	58	38	19	42	10	4	1	397	88

=== International ===
As of match played 30 January 2022

Appearances and goals by national team and year
National team	Year	Apps	Goals
Spain	2014	1	0
Spain	Total	1	0
Morocco	2021	8	2
Morocco	2022	3	0
Morocco	Total	11	2
Career total		12	2

Scores and results list Morocco's goal tally first.

List of international goals scored by Munir
No.	Date	Venue	Opponent	Score	Result	Competition
1	30 March 2021	Prince Moulay Abdellah Stadium, Rabat, Morocco	Burundi	1–0	1–0	2021 Africa Cup of Nations qualification
2	6 October 2021	Prince Moulay Abdellah Stadium, Rabat, Morocco	Guinea-Bissau	5–0	5–0	2022 FIFA World Cup qualification

== Honours ==
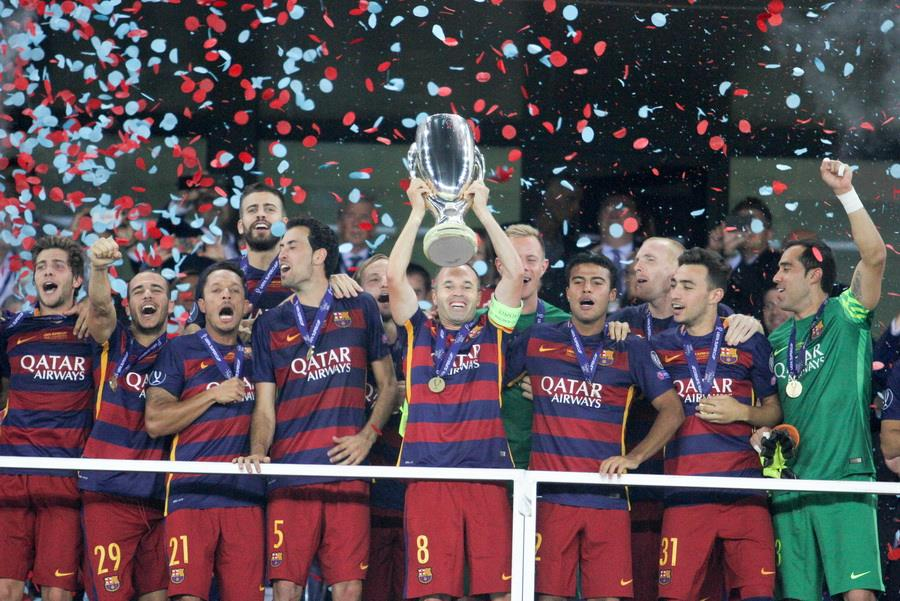
Munir (second from right) wearing his UEFA Super Cup medal, 2015

Barcelona Youth

- UEFA Youth League: 2013–14

Barcelona

- La Liga: 2014–15, 2015–16, 2018–19
- Copa del Rey: 2014–15, 2015–16
- Supercopa de España: 2016, 2018
- UEFA Champions League: 2014–15
- UEFA Super Cup: 2015
- FIFA Club World Cup: 2015

Sevilla

- UEFA Europa League: 2019–20

Individual

- UEFA Youth League top scorer: 2013–14
- UEFA Youth League top assists: 2013–14
- Copa del Rey top scorer: 2015–16
- UEFA Europa League Squad of the Season: 2019–20
- La Liga Goal of the Month: November 2024

== See also ==
- List of association footballers who have been capped for two senior national teams
