= Romário Baldé =

Bissau-Guinean footballer (born 1996)

Personal information
- Date of birth: 25 December 1996 (age 29)
- Place of birth: Bissau, Guinea-Bissau
- Height: 1.77 m (5 ft 10 in)
- Position: Winger

Team information
- Current team: Boeung Ket
- Number: 19

Youth career
- 2006–2008: Estrela da Amadora
- 2008–2015: Benfica

Senior career*
Years	Team	Apps	(Gls)
2014–2017	Benfica B	30	(1)
2015–2016	→ Tondela (loan)	24	(2)
2017–2019	Lechia Gdańsk	10	(1)
2018–2019	→ Académica (loan)	30	(2)
2019–2020	Gil Vicente	7	(0)
2020–2021	→ Leixões (loan)	4	(0)
2021–2022	Doxa Katokopias	12	(1)
2022	AEL Limassol	12	(1)
2022–2023	Ratchaburi	5	(0)
2023	Nantong Zhiyun	29	(5)
2024	Wuhan Three Towns	19	(2)
2025	Gangwon FC	1	(0)
2025–2026	APOEL	0	(0)
2026	Itabaiana	3	(0)
2026–	Boeung Ket	5	(1)

International career^{‡}
2011	Portugal U16	9	(1)
2011–2013	Portugal U17	19	(0)
2014	Portugal U18	5	(1)
2014–2015	Portugal U19	10	(5)
2015	Portugal U20	7	(2)
2019–	Guinea-Bissau	4	(0)
Medal record
Men's football
Representing Portugal
UEFA European Under-19 Championship
Runner-up	2014 Hungary
- * Club domestic league appearances and goals as of 9 November 2026 ‡ National team caps and goals as of 25 December 2024

Romário Baldé (born 25 December 1996) is a professional footballer who plays as a winger for Boeung Ket. A former youth international for Portugal, he plays for the Guinea-Bissau national team.

== Club career ==
Born in Bissau, Baldé arrived in the youth ranks of Benfica at age 12, from local Estrela da Amadora.

He represented the club on the debut season of UEFA Youth League, helping them progress all the way through the final, lost to Barcelona. The following season, the 17–year old made his professional debut for Benfica B in a 2014–15 Segunda Liga match against C.D. Trofense on 9 August 2014. He also represented Benfica again in the UEFA Youth League, reaching the quarter-finals against FC Shakhtar Donetsk, where he missed a penalty, attempted in panenka style, that would have given his team the lead. They were later eliminated in the penalty shootout.

In May 2015, Baldé announced that he would be leaving the club, after he could not agree on a new contract with Benfica. However, two months later, he back-tracked on that decision and signed a five-year extension with Benfica, being immediately loaned to Primeira Liga side Tondela for one season. He made his debut for Tondela in the 1–0 loss against Vitória de Guimarães on 13 September, and scored his first goal three weeks later in a 1–1 draw with Moreirense. Being regularly used throughout the season, he finished the campaign with 25 appearances and two goals.

In the following season, Baldé was not loaned out and remained at Benfica B, appearing in 21 games and scoring once. On 25 August 2017, Baldé moved on a permanent deal to Polish club, Lechia Gdańsk, signing a three-year contract. On 31 August, he moved to Académica de Coimbra on a one-year loan with an option to sign permanently.

In March 2023, Baldé joined Chinese Super League club Nantong Zhiyun.

On 24 February 2024, Baldé signed with fellow Chinese Super League club Wuhan Three Towns.

On 7 February 2025, Baldé signed with K League 1 club Gangwon FC.

== International career ==
Baldé represented Portugal at the 2014 UEFA European Under-19 Championship, scoring one goal. He captained the Portugal U20s for the 2016 Toulon Tournament.

Baldé made his Guinea-Bissau national team debut on 8 June 2019 in a friendly against Angola, as a half-time substitute for Jorginho.

== Career statistics ==
=== Club ===
As of match played 30 March 2025

Appearances and goals by club, season and competition
Club	Season	League			National cup (Note: Includes Taça de Portugal, Cypriot Cup, Thai FA Cup, Chinese FA Cup)		League cup (Note: Includes Taça da Liga)		Other		Total	
Club	Season	Division	Apps	Goals	Apps	Goals	Apps	Goals	Apps	Goals	Apps	Goals
Benfica B	2014–15	LigaPro	9	0	—		—		—		9	0
Benfica B	2016–17	LigaPro	21	1	—		—		—		21	1
Benfica B	Total		30	1	—		—		—		30	1
Tondela (loan)	2015–16	Primeira Liga	24	2	1	0	1	0	–		26	2
Lechia Gdańsk	2017–18	Ekstraklasa	10	1	0	0	—		—		10	1
Académica (loan)	2018–19	LigaPro	30	2	1	0	—		—		31	2
Gil Vicente	2019–20	Primeira Liga	7	0	0	0	3	0	—		10	0
Leixões (loan)	2019–20	LigaPro	4	0	—		—		—		4	0
Doxa Katokopias	2021–22	Cypriot First Division	12	1	1	1	—		—		13	2
AEL Limassol	2021–22	Cypriot First Division	12	0	1	0	—		—		13	0
Ratchaburi	2022–23	Thai League 1	5	0	1	0	0	0	—		7	0
Nantong Zhiyun	2023	Chinese Super League	29	5	2	0	—		—		31	5
Wuhan Three Towns	2024	Chinese Super League	19	2	1	0	—		—		20	2
Gangwon FC	2025	K League 1	1	0	—		—		—		1	0
APOEL	2025–26	Cypriot First Division	0	0	0	0	—		—		0	0
Career total			183	14	8	1	4	0	0	0	195	14

=== International ===
As of match played 10 September 2024

Appearances and goals by national team and year
National team	Year	Apps	Goals
Guinea-Bissau	2019	2	0
Guinea-Bissau	2024	2	0
Total		4	0

== Honours ==
Benfica U19

- UEFA Youth League runner-up: 2013–14

Portugal U19

- UEFA European Under-19 Championship runner-up: 2014
