= Stadio Gino Pistoni =

Multi-use stadium in Ivrea, Italy

Coordinates: 45°27′59″N 7°53′3″E

- Interactive map of Stadio Gino Pistoni
- Former names: Stadio Littorio (1934–1945)
- Location: Ivrea, Italy
- Owner: Municipality of Ivrea
- Capacity: 3,500
- Surface: Grass; 105x65m

Construction
- Opened: 1934

Tenant
- A.S.D. Calcio Ivrea (Eccellenza)

Stadio Gino Pistoni is a multi-use stadium in Ivrea, Italy. It is currently used mostly for football matches and is the home ground of A.S.D. Calcio Ivrea. The stadium holds 3,500 people.
