= Maximilian Wagener =

German footballer

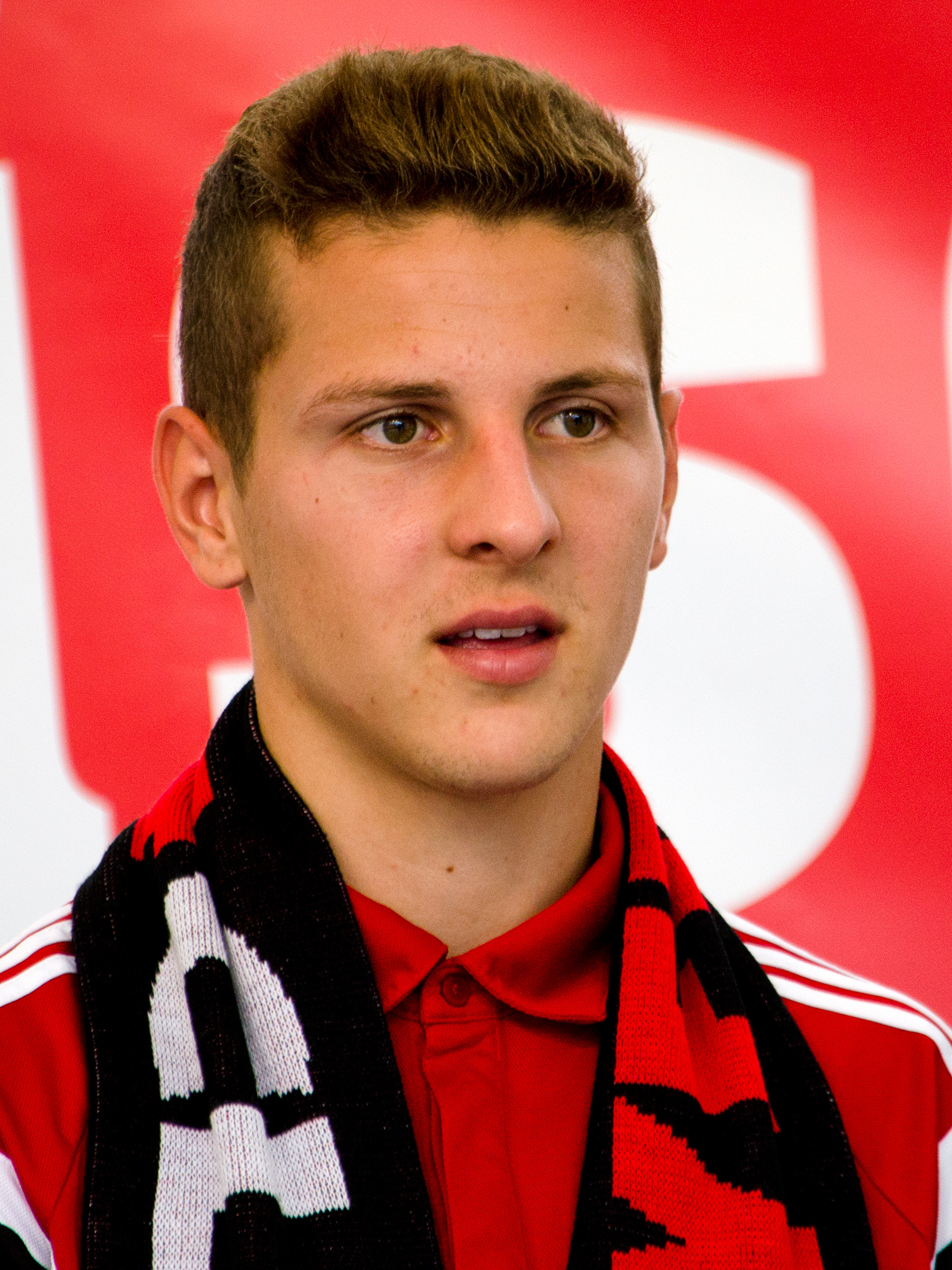
- Wagener with Leverkusen in 2014

Personal information
- Date of birth: 3 January 1995 (age 31)
- Place of birth: Wülfrath, Germany
- Height: 1.81 m (5 ft 11 1/2 in)
- Position: Winger

Team information
- Current team: VfB Hilden
- Number: 6

Youth career
- –2003: 1. FC Wülfrath
- 2003–2014: Bayer Leverkusen

Senior career*
Years	Team	Apps	(Gls)
2014–	Bayer Leverkusen	0	(0)
2014–2015	→ VfL Osnabrück (loan)	10	(0)
2015–2016	→ 1. FSV Mainz 05 II (loan)	2	(0)
2016–2017	SG Wattenscheid 09	1	(0)
2017–2020	SSVg Velbert	92	(9)
2020–	VfB Hilden	144	(27)

International career^{‡}
2014	Germany U19	1	(0)
- * Club domestic league appearances and goals as of 23 September 2026 ‡ National team caps and goals as of 21:56, 16 January 2015 (UTC)

Maximilian Wagener (born 3 January 1995) is a German footballer who plays as a winger for Oberliga Niederrhein club VfB Hilden.

== Club career ==
Wagener has been the captain of the Bayer Leverkusen Under-19 team.

He made his competitive debut for Bayer Leverkusen during the 2013–14 UEFA Champions League campaign against Paris Saint-Germain when he came on as a substitute on 12 March 2014.

On 1 September 2014, 3. Liga side VfL Osnabrück announced that they had loaned him from Bayer Leverkusen for the current season until summer 2015. The deal had been possible and quickly doable by the good relationship between the clubs.
