= Viktor Borzykh =

Russian football player

Personal information
- Full name: Viktor Aleksandrovich Borzykh
- Date of birth: 13 July 1996 (age 30)
- Place of birth: Moscow, Russia
- Height: 1.77 m (5 ft 9 1/2 in)
- Positions: Midfielder; forward

Youth career
- –2014: PFC CSKA Moscow

Senior career*
Years	Team	Apps	(Gls)
2015–2016	FSK Dolgoprudny	10	(0)
2016–2017	FC Chernomorets Novorossiysk	30	(4)
2017	FC Rotor Volgograd	13	(1)
2018	FC Chayka Peschanokopskoye	2	(0)
2018	FC Mashuk-KMV Pyatigorsk	7	(0)
- * Club domestic league appearances and goals as of 9 September 2018

Viktor Aleksandrovich Borzykh (Russian: Виктор Александрович Борзых (born 13 July 1996) is a Russian former football player.

== Club career ==
He made his debut in the Russian Professional Football League for FSK Dolgoprudny on 24 May 2015 in a game against FC Solyaris Moscow.

He made his Russian Football National League debut for FC Rotor Volgograd on 8 July 2017 in a game against FC Khimki.
