= Liga Elitelor =

The Liga Elitelor (transl. Elites League) is a system of youth football leagues that are managed, organised and controlled by the Romanian Football Federation. Introduced in 2015, it covers the under-17 and under-19 age groups.

== Under-19 level ==
Liga Elitelor U19
- Domestic cup(s): Cupa României U19; Supercupa României U19
- International cup: UEFA Youth League
- Current champions: FK Miercurea Ciuc
- Most championships: Viitorul Constanța (4 titles)

=== Champions ===
Season	Champions
2015–16	Viitorul Constanța
2016–17	Dinamo București
2017–18	Viitorul Constanța
2018–19	Viitorul Constanța
2019–20	Viitorul Constanța
2020–21	FK Miercurea Ciuc
2021–22	FK Miercurea Ciuc

== Under-17 level ==
Liga Elitelor U17
- Domestic cup(s): Cupa României U17; Supercupa României U17
- Current champions: Farul Constanța (2 titles)
- Most championships: Viitorul Constanța (4 titles)

=== Champions ===
Season	Champions
2015–16	Viitorul Constanța
2016–17	Universitatea Craiova
2017–18	Viitorul Constanța
2018–19	Viitorul Constanța
2019–20	-
2020–21	Viitorul Constanța
2021–22	Universitatea Craiova
2022–23	Universitatea Cluj
2023–24	Farul Constanța
2024–25	FCSB
2025–26	Farul Constanța
