= Ivan Rondanini =

Italian football player

Personal information
- Date of birth: 10 April 1995 (age 31)
- Place of birth: Cuggiono, Italy
- Height: 1.81 m (5 ft 11 1/2 in)
- Position: Right back

Team information
- Current team: GS Arconatese

Youth career
- –2016: AC Milan

Senior career*
Years	Team	Apps	(Gls)
2016	Savona	9	(1)
2016–2018	Robur Siena	45	(4)
2018–2019	Brescia	0	(0)
2019	Cremonese	1	(0)
2019–2021	Padova	9	(0)
2020–2021	→ Imolese (loan)	31	(2)
2021–	GS Arconatese	40	(1)

International career
2010	Italy U-16	3	(0)
2011–2012	Italy U-17	9	(0)
- * Club domestic league appearances and goals as of 4 October 2023

Ivan Rondanini (born 10 April 1995) is an Italian professional footballer who plays for Serie D club GS Arconatese.

== Club career ==
He made his Serie C debut for Savona on 16 January 2016 in a game against Pontedera.

On 25 July 2019, he signed a 2-year contract with Padova.

On 18 September 2020, he joined Imolese.
