= Miles Müller =

German footballer

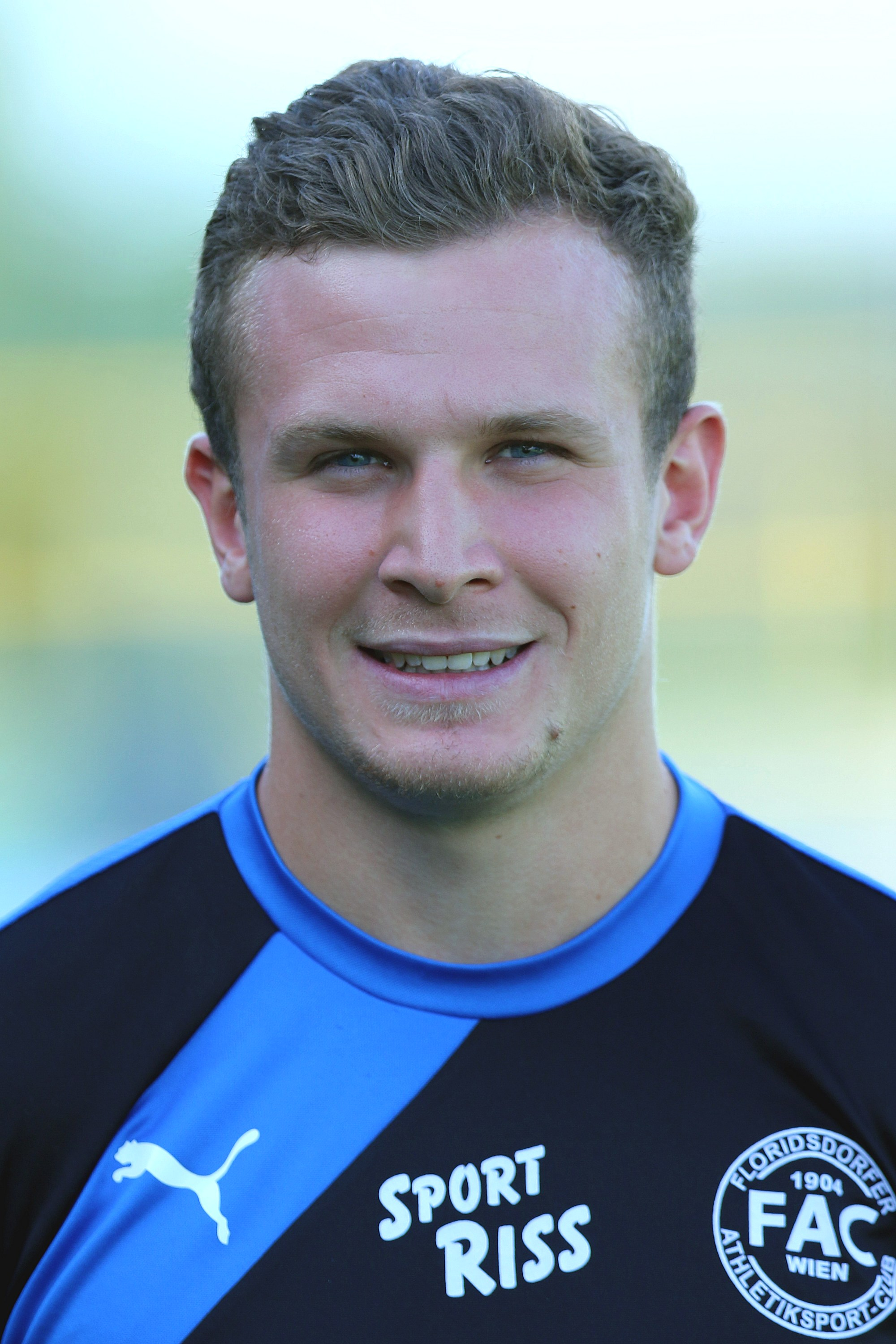
- Müller in 2016

Personal information
- Date of birth: 4 April 1995 (age 31)
- Place of birth: Dorsten, Germany
- Height: 1.80 m (5 ft 11 in)
- Position: Midfielder

Senior career*
Years	Team	Apps	(Gls)
2014–2015	Schalke 04 II	3	(0)
2015–2016	Admira Wacker Mödling II	23	(1)
2016–2017	Floridsdorfer AC	4	(0)
Total		30	(1)
- * Club domestic league appearances and goals

Miles Müller (born 4 April 1995) is a German former professional footballer who played as a midfielder.
