= Fodé Guirassy =

Professional footballer (born 1996)

Personal information
- Date of birth: 6 January 1996 (age 30)
- Place of birth: Aix-en-Provence, France
- Height: 1.89 m (6 ft 2 in)
- Position: Forward

Team information
- Current team: Fréjus Saint-Raphaël
- Number: 13

Youth career
- Marseille

Senior career*
Years	Team	Apps	(Gls)
2015–2016	Auxerre B	16	(0)
2016–2017	Sochaux B	23	(6)
2017–2018	Belfort	28	(12)
2018–2019	Laval	4	(0)
2018–2019	Laval B	17	(11)
2019–2020	Monts d'Or Azergues	19	(7)
2020–2021	Béziers	9	(5)
2021	Orléans	12	(2)
2021	Cherno More	5	(0)
2022	Canet Roussillon	12	(4)
2022–2023	Stade Briochin	27	(4)
2023	Stade Briochin B	1	(0)
2023–2024	Francs Borains	28	(3)
2024–2025	Versailles	13	(2)
2025–2026	Créteil	8	(1)
2026–	Fréjus Saint-Raphaël	1	(0)

International career
2016	Guinea U23	3	(0)
- * Club domestic league appearances and goals as of 7 February 2026

Fodé Guirassy (born 6 January 1996) is a professional footballer who plays as a forward for Championnat National 1 club Fréjus Saint-Raphaël. Born in France, he has represented Guinea at youth international level.

== Club career ==
In July 2021, Guirassy joined Bulgarian First League club Cherno More. In January 2022, he signed a contract with Championnat National 2 team Canet Roussillon. However, after only six months at the club, he joined Championnat National side Stade Briochin.

On 7 July 2023, Guirassy signed with Francs Borains in the Belgian second-tier Challenger Pro League.

On 14 September 2024, Guirassy joined French club Versailles on a one-year contract, with an option of a one-year extension.

== International career ==
Born in France, Guirassy chose to represent Guinea at international level. He was part of the Guinea under-23 team at the 2016 Toulon Tournament.
