= Lionel Enguene =

Cameroonian footballer (born 1996)

Personal information
- Full name: Zacharie Lionel Enguene Onana
- Date of birth: 7 January 1996 (age 30)
- Place of birth: Bertoua, Cameroon
- Height: 1.68 m (5 ft 6 in)
- Position: Attacking midfielder

Team information
- Current team: Olímpic de Xàtiva
- Number: 10

Youth career
- Samuel Eto'o Academy
- 2007–2015: Barcelona

Senior career*
Years	Team	Apps	(Gls)
2015–2016	Barcelona B	12	(0)
2016	Antalyaspor	6	(0)
2016–2017	Lugo	0	(0)
2017	→ Leixões (loan)	2	(0)
2019	Kazma		
2019	Telavi	2	(0)
2021–	Olímpic de Xàtiva	30	(3)

International career
2015	Cameroon U20	3	(0)
- * Club domestic league appearances and goals as of 16:09, 22 September 2022 (UTC)

Zacharie Lionel Enguene Onana (born 7 January 1996) is a Cameroonian footballer who plays as an attacking midfielder for Olímpic de Xàtiva.

== Club career ==
=== Barcelona ===
Born in Bertoua, Enguene came to FC Barcelona in 2007, through the Samuel Eto'o Foundation at the age of 11. In 2011, he scored 13 goals for the Cadete A team, also acting as the side's captain.

After finishing his graduation, Enguene was promoted to the reserves in July 2015, after the club's relegation to Segunda División B. He made his senior debut 22 August of that year, replacing Sergi Samper for the final 13 minutes of a 1–2 loss at UE Cornellà.

Enguene contributed with 12 appearances (only two starts, however) during the campaign before departing in January 2016.

=== Antalyaspor ===
On 19 January 2016 Enguene joined Antalyaspor in the Turkish Süper Lig. He made his professional debut five days later, starting in a 0–1 away loss against Gençlerbirliği.

=== Lugo ===
On 31 August 2016, Enguene signed a three-year deal with Segunda División club CD Lugo. After making no appearances, he was loaned to Leixões S.C. the following 31 January.

=== Kazma and Telavi ===
In the summer 2019, Enguene moved to Kuwaiti club Kazma SC. However, on 11 November 2019, it was announced that he had signed with Georgian club FC Telavi.

== Career statistics ==
As of 18 April 2016

Club performance			League		Cup		Continental		Other		Total	
Club	League	Season	Apps	Goals	Apps	Goals	Apps	Goals	Apps	Goals	Apps	Goals
Barcelona B	Segunda División B	2015–16	12	0	–		–		–		12	0
Antalyaspor	Süper Lig	2015–16	6	0	1	0	–		–		7	0
Lugo	Segunda División	2016–17	0	0	0	0	–		–		0	0
Career total			18	0	1	0	0	0	0	0	19	0

== Honours ==
=== Club ===
Barcelona

- UEFA Youth League: 2013–14
