= Stimbergstadion =

Football stadium in Oer-Erkenschwick, Germany

Coordinates: 51°38′36″N 7°15′09″E

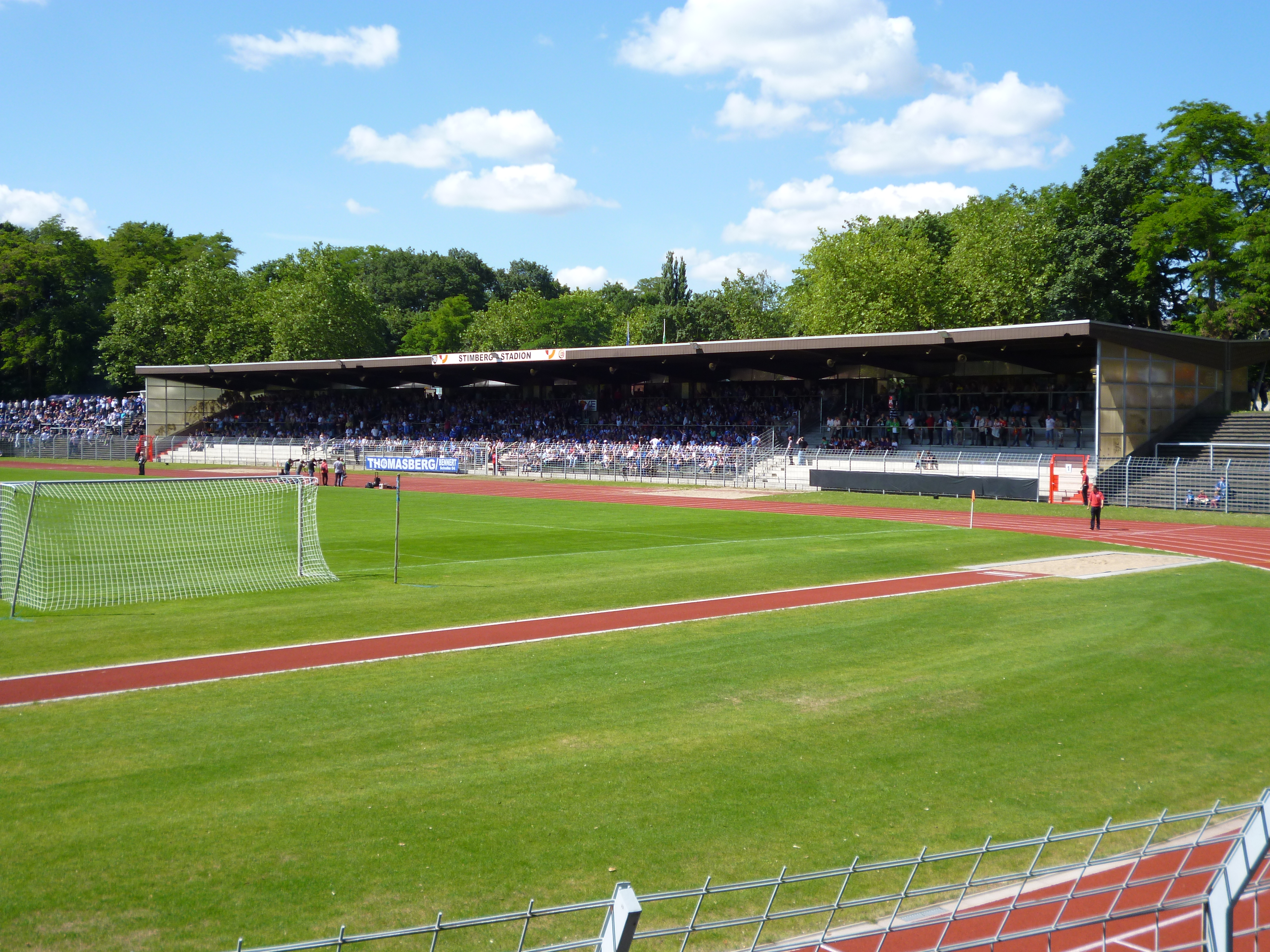
Stimbergstadion Haupttribüne

The Stimberg-Stadion is a multi-use stadium in Oer-Erkenschwick, Germany. It is currently used mostly for football matches and is the home of SpVgg Erkenschwick. The stadium, built in 1930, has a capacity of 14,380 spectators. The stadium opened in 1934.
