= Cobham Training Centre =

Training ground of Chelsea Football Club

- Cobham
- Interactive map of Cobham Training Centre
- Location: Cobham, Surrey
- Coordinates: 51°19′0.84″N 0°23′10.30″W
- Owner: Chelsea F.C.
- Type: Sports facility

Construction
- Built: 2004
- Opened: 2007

The Cobham Training Centre is the training ground of Chelsea Football Club located in the village of Stoke d'Abernon near the village of Cobham, Surrey. The Chelsea first team have trained at Stoke D'Abernon since 2005, but it was not officially opened until 2007.

== History ==
When Roman Abramovich purchased Chelsea FC in July 2003, the club's training facilities were identified as an important area for new investment. Chelsea had used the Harlington training ground since the 1970s, but it was owned by Imperial College, and its facilities were regarded as outdated in comparison to those of clubs such as Manchester United (Trafford Training Centre) and Arsenal (Arsenal Training Centre). Then-Chelsea manager Jose Mourinho regarded the move to a new, modern, training ground as "significant step forward" in the club's ambitions. Planning permission for a new state-of-the-art complex in Cobham was granted by Elmbridge Borough Council in 2004. Chelsea began training at Cobham in 2005, while construction was still ongoing, and the facility was officially unveiled in July 2007. In 2008, the final phase of the complex, an Academy and Community Pavilion for Chelsea's youth teams and Football in the Community department, was opened.

== Facilities ==
Costing a reported £20 million, the training ground is on a 140-acre site and, like a campus, it houses all of the club's football activities, from the first team to the academy, reserve and women's teams. It features "the latest in training, rehabilitation, medical, pitch and media technology" and its facilities include nine football pitches (three with undersoil heating and six to Premier League standard), an indoor artificial pitch, a media centre, gyms, cold immersion pools, a sauna, a steam room and a 56 ft HydroWorx hydrotherapy pool.

As a condition for receiving planning permission, none of the buildings in the complex were permitted to be taller than others in the surrounding area. Thus, approximately a third of the facility is underground; a moat was installed to reflect light into the basement rooms and to reduce energy usage. The main building also has a turf roof in order to help it blend into its surroundings and to improve air quality. Water from the surrounding area is collected in a reservoir for use on the pitch irrigation system.

== Other uses ==
Cobham has hosted the Surrey Positive Mental Awareness League, a football league for people with mental health problems. It also hosts the Cobham Cup, a tournament for under-16 teams from around the world, including River Plate and Bayern Munich. In 2007, the Chinese Olympic football team trained at Cobham for two weeks in preparation for the 2008 Summer Olympics. Old Malvernians play their home matches at Cobham. The training facilities are also used by Cobham Rugby Football Club.
