= Borja Martínez (footballer, born 1995) =

Spanish footballer

Personal information
- Full name: Borja Martínez Sánchez
- Date of birth: 8 February 1995 (age 31)
- Place of birth: Elche de la Sierra, Spain
- Height: 1.78 m (5 ft 10 in)
- Position: Midfielder

Team information
- Current team: Lee Man
- Number: 8

Youth career
- Murcia
- 2007–2013: Atlético Madrid

Senior career*
Years	Team	Apps	(Gls)
2013–2015	Atlético Madrid B	29	(0)
2015–2017	Espanyol B	63	(0)
2017–2018	Atlético Baleares	23	(0)
2018	Parla	16	(1)
2019–2020	Getafe B	35	(1)
2020–2021	Pontevedra	23	(1)
2021–2022	Castellón	29	(1)
2022–2023	Logroñés	37	(0)
2023–2024	Gimnàstic	36	(1)
2024–2025	SKA-Khabarovsk	20	(2)
2026	Persijap Jepara	15	(1)
2026–	Lee Man	4	(0)

International career
2012	Spain U16	1	(0)
2011–2012	Spain U17	6	(0)
2013	Spain U18	3	(0)
- * Club domestic league appearances and goals as of 15:47, 20 November 2026 (UTC)

Borja Martínez Sánchez (born 8 February 1995) is a Spanish professional footballer who currently plays as a midfielder for Hong Kong Premier League club Lee Man.

== Club career ==
Born in Vicorto, Elche de la Sierra, Albacete, Castilla–La Mancha, Martínez joined Atlético Madrid's youth setup in 2007, from Real Murcia. On 8 April 2013, while still a youth, he renewed his contract until 2016.

Martínez made his senior debut with the reserves on 24 August 2013, coming on as a second-half substitute in a 1–0 Segunda División B home loss against Real Madrid C. On 2 February 2015, he moved to another reserve team, RCD Espanyol B also in the third division.

On 4 July 2017, Martínez signed for fellow third tier side CD Atlético Baleares. In August of the following year, after failing to establish himself as a starter, he agreed to a deal with AD Parla in Tercera División.

On 30 December 2018, Martínez joined Getafe CF and was assigned to the B-team also in division four. He helped in the club's promotion to the third level as a starter, losing his starting spot afterwards.

On 22 July 2020, Martínez moved to third division side Pontevedra CF. He subsequently played in Primera Federación in the following three years, representing CD Castellón, SD Logroñés and Gimnàstic de Tarragona.

On 27 September 2024, Martínez moved abroad for the first time in his career and signed with the second-tier Russian First League club SKA-Khabarovsk. He left SKA-Khabarovsk on 13 June 2025.

On 29 September 2026, Martínez joined Hong Kong Premier League club Lee Man.
