= Svyatoslav Georgiyevsky =

Russian footballer

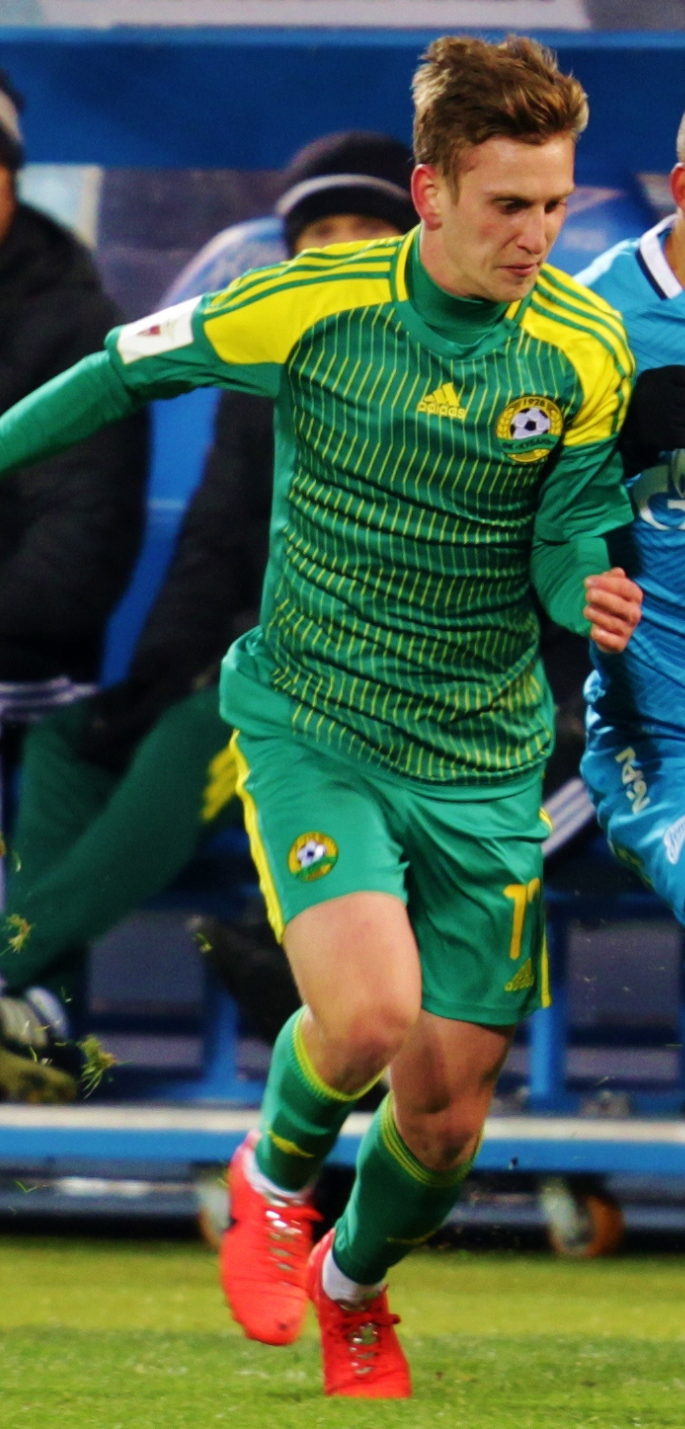
- Georgiyevsky with Kuban in 2016

Personal information
- Full name: Svyatoslav Igorevich Georgiyevsky
- Date of birth: 26 August 1995 (age 31)
- Place of birth: Moscow, Russia
- Height: 1.74 m (5 ft 9 in)
- Position: Midfielder

Youth career
- Chertanovo Education Center
- SDYuShOR-27 Sokol Moscow
- PFC CSKA Moscow

Senior career*
Years	Team	Apps	(Gls)
2013–2015	PFC CSKA Moscow	0	(0)
2015–2016	FC Kuban Krasnodar	7	(0)
2016–2017	FC Anzhi Makhachkala	10	(0)
2017–2018	FC Krylia Sovetov Samara	5	(0)
2019	FC Ararat Moscow (amateur)		
2019	FC Zorkiy Krasnogorsk	15	(7)
2020	FC Khimki	2	(0)
2021	FC SKA-Khabarovsk	11	(0)
2021–2022	FC Novosibirsk	19	(5)
2022–2023	FC Zorkiy Krasnogorsk	16	(3)
- * Club domestic league appearances and goals

Svyatoslav Igorevich Georgiyevsky (Russian: Святослав Игоревич Георгиевский; born 26 August 1995) is a Russian former professional football player.

== Club career ==
He made his professional debut on 24 September 2014 for PFC CSKA Moscow in a Russian Cup game against FC Khimik Dzerzhinsk.

He made his debut for the main squad of FC Kuban Krasnodar on 23 September 2015 in a Russian Cup game against FC Shinnik Yaroslavl.

He made his Russian Premier League debut on 7 November 2015 for FC Kuban Krasnodar in a game against FC Dynamo Moscow.
