= Rochinha (Portuguese footballer) =

Portuguese footballer (born 1995)

Personal information
- Full name: Diogo Filipe Costa Rocha
- Date of birth: 3 May 1995 (age 31)
- Place of birth: Espinho, Portugal
- Height: 1.69 m (5 ft 7 in)
- Position: Winger

Team information
- Current team: Casa Pia
- Number: 10

Youth career
- 2004–2009: Porto
- 2009–2011: Feirense
- 2011–2012: Boavista
- 2012–2014: Benfica

Senior career*
Years	Team	Apps	(Gls)
2014–2015	Benfica B	4	(0)
2015	→ Bolton Wanderers (loan)	4	(0)
2015–2016	Standard Liège	2	(0)
2016–2019	Boavista	51	(4)
2019–2022	Vitória Guimarães	97	(14)
2022–2024	Sporting CP	16	(1)
2023–2024	→ Al-Markhiya (loan)	11	(0)
2024	Kasımpaşa	7	(0)
2024–2026	Famalicão	23	(0)
2026–	Casa Pia	5	(0)

International career
2012	Portugal U17	1	(0)
2014	Portugal U19	5	(0)
- * Club domestic league appearances and goals as of 19:58, 7 November 2026 (UTC)

Diogo Filipe Costa Rocha (born 3 May 1995), known as Rochinha, is a Portuguese professional footballer who plays as a winger for Primeira Liga club Casa Pia.

== Club career ==
Born in Espinho, Aveiro District of Angolan descent, Rochinha started his youth career with Porto and finished it with Benfica, making five assists and scoring six goals for the latter during the 2013–14 edition of the UEFA Youth League. He made his senior debut with their reserves on 1 October 2014, coming on as a 79th-minute substitute in a 1–1 home draw against Santa Clara in the Segunda Liga.

On 26 January 2015, Benfica announced that Rochinha had been loaned to English club Bolton Wanderers. He first appeared in the Championship on 17 March, starting and being replaced towards the end of the 1–0 away loss to Ipswich Town, for which he earned praise from manager Neil Lennon.

Rochinha signed a three-year contract with Belgian side Standard Liège on 30 July 2015. On 26 December 2016, after several months without a team, he returned to his country and joined Boavista for an undisclosed fee. His first game in the Primeira Liga took place on 4 February 2017 when he played injury time in a 0–0 draw at Chaves, and his first goal came early into the following season in a 2–1 defeat against Portimonense.

On 30 January 2019, Rochinha agreed to a four-and-a-half-year deal at Vitória de Guimarães in the same league. He scored 19 times during his spell at the Estádio D. Afonso Henriques, adding 17 assists in 122 competitive matches.

On 6 July 2022, Rochinha joined Sporting CP on a four-year contract for €2 million, with Vitória being entitled to 10% of a future transfer. One year later, he was loaned to Al-Markhiya; the Qatar Stars League club held a €2.5 million buying option at the end of the season.

Rochinha severed his ties to Sporting on 1 February 2024, by mutual agreement. Eight days later, he joined Kasımpaşa in the Turkish Süper Lig.

On 28 June 2024, Rochinha signed a three-year contract with Famalicão. He made 24 scoreless appearances in his debut campaign, but was subsequently completely ostracised by manager Hugo Oliveira.

On 16 July 2026, Rochinha joined fellow top-division Casa Pia on a one-year deal, with the possibility of a one-year extension.

== International career ==
Rochinha represented Portugal at under-17 and under-19 levels.

== Honours ==
Benfica

- UEFA Youth League runner-up: 2013–14
