= F.C. Copenhagen Reserves and Youth Team =

FCK 2
- Full name: Football Club København Reserves
- Short name: FCK 2
- Ground: Nummer 10, Frederiksberg
- Chairman: (Denmark) Sune Smith-Nielsen
- Reserve team coach: (Denmark) Sune Holmgren
- League: Danish Reserve League (Defunct)
- 2009–10: 2nd Division East, 9th
- Website: www.fck.dk
Home colours	Away colours	Third colours

F.C. Copenhagen School of Excellence and FCK 2 are the youth and reserve team of F.C. Copenhagen. The under-19 team is member of the Danish U19 League and the Future Cup. The under-19 team is coached by Sune Holmgren. The under-17 and the under-15 team are coached by Emil Fredslund and Mads Vittenbach, respectively.

== Under-19 squad ==
As of 1 February 2026 Note: Flags indicate national team as defined under FIFA eligibility rules; some limited exceptions apply. Players may hold more than one non-FIFA nationality.

No.	Pos.	Nation	Player
1	GK	DEN	Tobias Breum-Harild (captain)
2	DF	DEN	David Katlego
3	DF	KOR	Lee Kyung-hyun
4	DF	DEN	Graham Ankamafio
5	DF	GAM	Mustapha Nyassi
6	MF	DEN	Frederik Petersen
7	MF	ISL	Gunnar Olsen
10	MF	MAR	Ahmed Mouhoub
11	FW	DEN	Roberto Risnæs
12	FW	GHA	David Boison Frimpong
13	MF	DEN	Sylvester Hildebrandt
14	FW	DEN	Abdul Daramy
16	DF	DEN	Sebastian Christensen

No.	Pos.	Nation	Player
17	MF	DEN	Marvin Nasnas
18	DF	DEN	William Nørløv
19	DF	DEN	Aske Bang
20	DF	NOR	Henrik Haraldsen
21	GK	DEN	Alfred Bruun
21	GK	DEN	Gustav Fritz
22	MF	DEN	Sean Fetterlein
23	DF	DEN	Noah Madsen
24	MF	SWE	Alexander Odefalk
25	FW	GAM	Sheikh Jaw
27	DF	URU	Brandon Llana
—	FW	CMR	Geovanni Vianney
—	FW	SWE	Gabriel Santos

== Under-17 squad ==
As of 12 December 2025 Note: Flags indicate national team as defined under FIFA eligibility rules; some limited exceptions apply. Players may hold more than one non-FIFA nationality.

No.	Pos.	Nation	Player
—	GK	DEN	Villada Bille
—	GK	DEN	Oliver Nordenbøl
—	DF	DEN	Teiz Hansen
—	DF	DEN	Vidal Moritzen
—	DF	SWE	Liam Nordstedt
—	DF	DEN	Xander Poulsen
—	DF	DEN	Elias Villumsen
—	MF	DEN	Tristan Christensen
—	MF	SVK	Christian Hamsik

No.	Pos.	Nation	Player
—	MF	DEN	Ishaq Holalam
—	MF	DEN	Mads Jørgensen
—	MF	DEN	Shahin Pelyad
—	MF	SWE	Simon Voin
—	FW	DEN	Jamil El-Rrami
—	FW	DEN	Louie Heriba
—	FW	DEN	Rolex Kingdom
—	FW	BIH	Elvin Mehicic
—	FW	DEN	Teo Reeh
