= 2011 Copa América disciplinary record =

In the 2011 Copa América, the main disciplinary action taken against players came in the form of red and yellow cards.

Any player picking up a red card was expelled from the pitch and automatically banned for his country's next match, whether via a straight red or second yellow. After a straight red card, FIFA would conduct a hearing and could extend this ban beyond one match. If the ban extended beyond the end of the finals (i.e. if a player was sent off in the match in which his team was eliminated), it had to be served in the team's next competitive international match(es).

== Disciplinary statistics ==
- Total number of yellow cards: 128
- Average yellow cards per match: 4.92
- Total number of red cards: 14
- Average red cards per match: 0.54
- First yellow card: Wálter Flores (Bolivia against Argentina)
- First red card: Randall Brenes (Costa Rica against Colombia)
- Fastest yellow card from kick off: 1 minute (Luis Advíncula; Peru against Colombia and Yoshimar Yotún; Peru against Uruguay)
- Fastest yellow card after coming on as substitute: 1 minutes (Édgar Barreto and Elvis Marecos; both Paraguay against Brazil)
- Latest yellow card in a match without extra time: 90+4 minutes (Franklin Lucena; Venezuela against Brazil)
- Fastest dismissal from kick off: 28 minutes (Randall Brenes; Costa Rica against Colombia)
- Fastest dismissal of a substitute: None
- Latest dismissal in a match without extra time: 90+4 minutes (Tomás Rincón; Venezuela against Chile)
- Latest dismissal in a match with extra time: 103 minutes (Antolín Alcaraz; Paraguay against Brazil and Lucas Leiva; Brazil against Paraguay)
- Least time difference between two yellow cards given to the same player: 5 minutes (Ronald Rivero; Bolivia against Costa Rica)
- Most yellow cards (team): 18 (Uruguay)
- Most red cards (team): 2 (Bolivia, Chile, Paraguay, Peru, Venezuela)
- Fewest yellow cards (team): 2 (Ecuador)
- Most yellow cards (player): 4 (Martín Cáceres)
- Most red cards (player): 2 (Tomás Rincón)
- Most yellow cards (match): 11 (Argentina against Uruguay)
- Most red cards (match): 2 (Bolivia against Costa Rica; Chile against Peru; Argentina against Uruguay; Brazil against Paraguay and Chile against Venezuela)
- Fewest yellow cards (match): 0 (Venezuela against Ecuador)
- Most cards in one match: 11 yellow cards and 2 red cards (Argentina against Uruguay)

== Detailed statistics ==
=== By match ===
Day	Match	Round	Referee	Total cards	Yellow	Second yellow	Straight red
Day 1	Argentina vs Bolivia	Group A	(Uruguay) Roberto Silvera	6	6	0	0
Day 2	Colombia vs Costa Rica	Group A	(Chile) Enrique Osses	6	5	0	1
Day 3	Brazil vs Venezuela	Group B	(Bolivia) Raúl Orosco	4	4	0	0
Day 3	Paraguay vs Ecuador	Group B	(Argentina) Sergio Pezzotta	2	2	0	0
Day 4	Uruguay vs Peru	Group C	(Colombia) Wilmar Roldán	5	5	0	0
Day 4	Chile vs Mexico	Group C	(Venezuela) Juan Soto	5	5	0	0
Day 5	Argentina vs Colombia	Group A	(Brazil) Sálvio Fagundes	3	3	0	0
Day 5	Bolivia vs Costa Rica	Group A	(Ecuador) Carlos Vera	11	9	1	1
Day 6	Uruguay vs Chile	Group C	(Paraguay) Carlos Amarilla	9	9	0	0
Day 6	Peru vs Mexico	Group C	(Argentina) Sergio Pezzotta	2	2	0	0
Day 7	Brazil vs Paraguay	Group B	(Colombia) Wilmar Roldán	6	6	0	0
Day 7	Venezuela vs Ecuador	Group B	(Costa Rica) Wálter Quesada	0	0	0	0
Day 8	Colombia vs Bolivia	Group A	(Mexico) Francisco Chacón	1	1	0	0
Day 9	Argentina vs Costa Rica	Group A	(Peru) Víctor Hugo Rivera	6	6	0	0
Day 10	Chile vs Peru	Group C	(Brazil) Sálvio Fagundes	8	6	0	2
Day 10	Uruguay vs Mexico	Group C	(Bolivia) Raúl Orosco	4	4	0	0
Day 11	Paraguay vs Venezuela	Group B	(Chile) Enrique Osses	4	4	0	0
Day 11	Brazil vs Ecuador	Group B	(Uruguay) Roberto Silvera	3	3	0	0
Day 14	Colombia vs Peru	Quarter-finals	(Mexico) Francisco Chacón	3	3	0	0
Day 14	Argentina vs Uruguay	Quarter-finals	(Paraguay) Carlos Amarilla	13	11	2	0
Day 15	Brazil vs Paraguay	Quarter-finals	(Argentina) Sergio Pezzotta	8	6	0	2
Day 15	Chile vs Venezuela	Quarter-finals	(Ecuador) Carlos Vera	9	7	1	1
Day 17	Peru vs Uruguay	Semi-finals	(Bolivia) Raúl Orosco	7	6	0	1
Day 18	Paraguay vs Venezuela	Semi-finals	(Mexico) Francisco Chacón	5	4	1	0
Day 21	Peru vs Venezuela	Third place match	(Colombia) Wilmar Roldán	6	5	0	1
Day 22	Uruguay vs Paraguay	Final	(Brazil) Sálvio Fagundes	6	6	0	0

=== By referee ===
Referee	Matches	Red	Yellow	Red cards	Penalties awarded
(Ecuador) Carlos Vera	2	4	16	2 straight reds 2 second yellows	1
(Paraguay) Carlos Amarilla	2	2	20	2 second yellows	0
(Brazil) Sálvio Fagundes	3	2	15	2 straight reds	0
(Argentina) Sergio Pezzotta	3	2	10	2 straight reds	0
(Colombia) Wilmar Roldán	3	1	16	1 straight red	0
(Bolivia) Raúl Orosco	3	1	14	1 straight red	0
(Chile) Enrique Osses	2	1	9	1 straight red	0
(Mexico) Francisco Chacón	3	1	8	1 second yellow	2
(Uruguay) Roberto Silvera	2	0	9		0
(Peru) Víctor Hugo Rivera	1	0	6		0
(Venezuela) Juan Soto	1	0	5		0
(Costa Rica) Wálter Quesada	1	0	0		0

=== By team ===
Team	Yellow	Red	Red Cards	Reason
Paraguay	15	2	Antolín Alcaraz vs Brazil straight red Jonathan Santana vs Venezuela second yellow	misconduct tactical foul
Peru	15	2	Giancarlo Carmona vs Chile straight red Juan Manuel Vargas vs Uruguay straight red	fighting elbowing an opponent
Chile	12	2	Jean Beausejour vs Peru straight red Gary Medel vs Venezuela second yellow	fighting handling the ball
Bolivia	11	2	Ronald Rivero vs Costa Rica second yellow Wálter Flores vs Costa Rica straight red	handling the ball tackling
Venezuela	11	2	Tomás Rincón vs Chile straight red and vs Peru straight red	shirt pulling + swinging a fist at opponent tackling
Uruguay	18	1	Diego Pérez vs Argentina second yellow	tactical foul
Argentina	14	1	Javier Mascherano vs Uruguay second yellow	tackling
Brazil	8	1	Lucas Leiva vs Paraguay straight red	misconduct
Costa Rica	8	1	Randall Brenes vs Colombia straight red	tackling
Mexico	9	0		
Colombia	5	0		
Ecuador	2	0		

== By player ==
99 red cards
(Venezuela) Tomás Rincón

1 red card

(Argentina) Javier Mascherano
(Bolivia) Wálter Flores
(Bolivia) Ronald Rivero
(Brazil) Lucas Leiva

(Chile) Jean Beausejour
(Chile) Gary Medel
(Costa Rica) Randall Brenes
(Paraguay) Antolín Alcaraz

(Paraguay) Jonathan Santana
(Peru) Giancarlo Carmona
(Peru) Juan Manuel Vargas
(Uruguay) Diego Pérez

4 yellow cards
(Uruguay) Martín Cáceres

3 yellow cards

(Bolivia) Ronald Rivero
(Paraguay) Jonathan Santana

(Uruguay) Sebastián Coates

(Uruguay) Diego Pérez

2 yellow cards

(Argentina) Fernando Gago
(Argentina) Ezequiel Lavezzi
(Argentina) Javier Mascherano
(Argentina) Gabriel Milito
(Argentina) Carlos Tevez
(Bolivia) Jhasmani Campos
(Bolivia) Luis Gutiérrez
(Brazil) André Santos
(Chile) Pablo Contreras

(Chile) Gary Medel
(Chile) Arturo Vidal
(Costa Rica) Francisco Calvo
(Costa Rica) Óscar Duarte
(Costa Rica) David Guzmán
(Mexico) Paul Aguilar
(Mexico) Hiram Mier
(Paraguay) Víctor Cáceres
(Paraguay) Enrique Vera

(Peru) Adan Balbín
(Peru) Rinaldo Cruzado
(Uruguay) Álvaro González
(Uruguay) Luis Suárez
(Venezuela) César González
(Venezuela) Franklin Lucena
(Venezuela) Giancarlo Maldonado

1 yellow card

(Argentina) Lucas Biglia
(Argentina) Nicolás Burdisso
(Argentina) Pablo Zabaleta
(Argentina) Javier Zanetti
(Bolivia) Lorgio Álvarez
(Bolivia) José Luis Chávez
(Bolivia) Wálter Flores
(Bolivia) Marcelo Moreno
(Brazil) Dani Alves
(Brazil) Jádson
(Brazil) Lucas Leiva
(Brazil) Maicon
(Brazil) Alexandre Pato
(Brazil) Thiago Silva
(Chile) Claudio Bravo
(Chile) Marco Estrada
(Chile) Mauricio Isla
(Chile) Gonzalo Jara
(Chile) Alexis Sánchez
(Chile) Jorge Valdivia
(Colombia) Abel Aguilar

(Colombia) Fredy Guarín
(Colombia) Dayro Moreno
(Colombia) Carlos Sánchez
(Colombia) Camilo Zúñiga
(Costa Rica) Diego Madrigal
(Costa Rica) José Salvatierra
(Ecuador) Oswaldo Minda
(Ecuador) Christian Noboa
(Mexico) Javier Aquino
(Mexico) Rafael Márquez Lugo
(Mexico) Édgar Pacheco
(Mexico) Diego Reyes
(Mexico) Héctor Reynoso
(Paraguay) Édgar Barreto
(Paraguay) Lucas Barrios
(Paraguay) Marcelo Estigarribia
(Paraguay) Elvis Marecos
(Paraguay) Iván Piris
(Paraguay) Nelson Valdez
(Paraguay) Darío Verón
(Paraguay) Pablo Zeballos

(Peru) Santiago Acasiete
(Peru) Luis Advíncula
(Peru) Aldo Corzo
(Peru) Paolo Guerrero
(Peru) Salomón Libman
(Peru) Carlos Lobatón
(Peru) Christian Ramos
(Peru) Renzo Revoredo
(Peru) Alberto Rodríguez
(Peru) Juan Manuel Vargas
(Peru) Yoshimar Yotún
(Uruguay) Walter Gargano
(Uruguay) Diego Lugano
(Uruguay) Álvaro Pereira
(Uruguay) Maxi Pereira
(Venezuela) Gabriel Cichero
(Venezuela) Grenddy Perozo
(Venezuela) José Manuel Rey
(Venezuela) Salomón Rondón
(Venezuela) Roberto Rosales

== Fair Play Award ==
The Fair Play Award was given to the team with the best overall discipline throughout the tournament. Teams were given a certain number of points—15 in the first stage, 5 in the quarter-finals, and 10 points for the remaining four teams—from which points were deducted depending on the infraction. The team that advanced past the first stage with the most points was awarded the trophy. Teams that dropped below zero points were excluded from winning the award.

Infraction	Points deducted
Booking of a player (yellow card)	1 point
Expulsion of a player (red card)	2 points
Suspension per game	1 point
Delay of game at the start of restart of a match	2 points
Misconduct of the players and/or coaching staff	1 point
Recidivism of misconduct	2 points
Incomplete team	1 point
Abandonment of the game	Exclusion
Others	Case-by-case judgement

The four semi-finalists (Paraguay, Peru, Uruguay, and Venezuela) were the only teams considered for the Fair Play Award. After a post-match brawl in the semi-finals, Paraguay and Venezuela were excluded from winning the award. Peru and Uruguay finished the tournament with the same number of points. Since Uruguay had fewer players handed a red card during the tournament, they won the Fair Play Award.

Team	IP	D1	D2	D3		QF		SF	3/F	Total
Paraguay	15	−4	−5	−2	+5	−7	+10	X	X	N/A
Peru	15	−4	−0	−7	+5	−2	+10	−6	−3	8
Uruguay	15	−1	−6	−2	+5	−5	+10	−3	−5	8
Venezuela	15	−5	−0	−2	+5	−5	+10	X	X	N/A
