= 2011 Copa América knockout stage =

The 2011 Copa América knockout stage was the elimination stage of the 2011 Copa América, following the group stage. It began on 16 July 2011 and consisted of the quarter-finals, the semi-finals, the third place play-off, and the final held at the Estadio Monumental Antonio Vespucio Liberti on 24 July, in Buenos Aires. Different from previous tournaments, 30 minutes of extra time were played if any match in the final stages finished tied after regulation; previously the match would go straight to a penalty shoot-out.

All times are local, Argentina Time (UTC−03:00).

== Qualified teams ==
The top two placed teams from each of the three groups, plus the two best-placed third teams, qualified for the knockout stage.

Group	Winners	Runners-up	Third-placed team (Best two qualify)
A	Colombia	Argentina	—N/a
B	Brazil	Venezuela	Paraguay
C	Chile	Uruguay	Peru

== Bracket ==
Quarter-finals
July 16 - Córdoba
Colombia	0
Peru (a.e.t.)	2
July 16 - Santa Fe
Argentina	1 (4)
Uruguay (p)	1 (5)
July 17 - La Plata
Brazil	0 (0)
Paraguay (p)	0 (2)
July 17 - San Juan
Chile	1
Venezuela	2

Semi-finals
July 19 - La Plata
Peru	0
Uruguay	2
July 20 - Mendoza
Paraguay (p)	0 (5)
Venezuela	0 (3)

Final
July 24 - Buenos Aires
Uruguay	3
Paraguay	0
Third place play-off
July 23 - La Plata
Peru	4
Venezuela	1

== Quarter-finals ==
=== Colombia vs Peru ===
16 July 2011
16:00

Colombia	0–2 (a.e.t.)	Peru
	Report	Lobatón 101'; Vargas 111'

Estadio Mario Alberto Kempes, Córdoba
Referee: Francisco Chacón (Mexico)

Colombia	Peru

GK	12	Neco Martínez
RB	18	Juan Camilo Zúñiga
CB	14	Luis Amaranto Perea
CB	3	Mario Yepes (c)
LB	7	Pablo Armero
CM	13	Fredy Guarín
CM	6	Carlos Sánchez	(yellow card) 98'	(substituted off) 111'
CM	8	Abel Aguilar		(substituted off) 105'
RW	17	Dayro Moreno
LW	20	Adrián Ramos		(substituted off) 72'
CF	9	Radamel Falcao
Substitutions:
FW	11	Hugo Rodallega		(substituted on) 72'
FW	19	Teófilo Gutiérrez		(substituted on) 105'
FW	21	Jackson Martínez		(substituted on) 111'
Manager:
Hernán Darío Gómez

GK	1	Raúl Fernández
RB	13	Renzo Revoredo
CB	21	Christian Ramos
CB	2	Alberto Rodríguez	(yellow card) 65'
LB	4	Walter Vílchez (c)
RM	5	Adan Balbin
CM	10	Rinaldo Cruzado		(substituted off) 117'
LM	6	Juan Manuel Vargas
RW	18	William Chiroque		(substituted off) 95'
LW	16	Luis Advíncula	(yellow card) 1'	(substituted off) 46'
CF	9	Paolo Guerrero
Substitutions:
MF	11	Carlos Lobatón		(substituted on) 46'
DF	19	Yoshimar Yotún		(substituted on) 95'
MF	7	Josepmir Ballón		(substituted on) 117'
Manager:
Sergio Markarián (Uruguay)

Man of the Match:
Juan Manuel Vargas (Peru)

Assistant referees:
Leonel Leal (Costa Rica)
Francisco Mondría (Chile)
Fourth official:
Wálter Quesada (Costa Rica)

=== Argentina vs Uruguay ===
16 July 2011
19:15

Argentina	1–1 (a.e.t.)	Uruguay
Higuaín 17'	Report	Pérez 5'
Penalties
Messi (penalty scored); Burdisso (penalty scored); Tevez (penalty missed); Pastore (penalty scored); Higuaín (penalty scored)	4–5	(penalty scored) Forlán; (penalty scored) Suárez; (penalty scored) Scotti; (penalty scored) Gargano; (penalty scored) Cáceres

Estadio Brigadier General Estanislao López, Santa Fe
Referee: Carlos Amarilla (Paraguay)

Argentina	Uruguay

GK	23	Sergio Romero
RB	3	Pablo Zabaleta	(yellow card) 9'
CB	4	Nicolás Burdisso	(yellow card) 72'
CB	6	Gabriel Milito	(yellow card) 70'
LB	8	Javier Zanetti
CM	20	Fernando Gago	(yellow card) 93'	(substituted off) 97'
CM	14	Javier Mascherano (c)	(yellow card) 50' (yellow-red card) 87'
RW	10	Lionel Messi
AM	7	Ángel Di María		(substituted off) 72'
LW	16	Sergio Agüero		(substituted off) 84'
CF	9	Gonzalo Higuaín
Substitutions:
MF	18	Javier Pastore		(substituted on) 72'
FW	11	Carlos Tevez	(yellow card) 119'	(substituted on) 84'
MF	15	Lucas Biglia		(substituted on) 97'
Manager:
Sergio Batista

GK	1	Fernando Muslera
RB	16	Maxi Pereira
CB	2	Diego Lugano (c)
CB	6	Mauricio Victorino		(substituted off) 20'
LB	22	Martín Cáceres	(yellow card) 32'
RM	20	Álvaro González	(yellow card) 33'
CM	15	Diego Pérez	(yellow card) 2' (yellow-red card) 38'
CM	17	Egidio Arévalo Ríos		(substituted off) 110'
LM	11	Álvaro Pereira		(substituted off) 110'
CF	10	Diego Forlán
CF	9	Luis Suárez
Substitutions:
DF	19	Andrés Scotti		(substituted on) 20'
MF	5	Walter Gargano		(substituted on) 110'
MF	8	Sebastián Eguren		(substituted on) 110'
Manager:
Óscar Tabárez

Man of the Match:
Fernando Muslera (Uruguay)

Assistant referees:
Nicolás Yegros (Paraguay)
Luis Sánchez (Venezuela)
Fourth official:
Juan Soto (Venezuela)

=== Brazil vs Paraguay ===
17 July 2011
16:00

Brazil	0–0 (a.e.t.)	Paraguay
	Report
Penalties
Elano (penalty missed); Thiago Silva (penalty missed); André Santos (penalty missed); Fred (penalty missed)	0–2	(penalty missed) É. Barreto; (penalty scored) Estigarribia; (penalty scored) Riveros

Estadio Ciudad de La Plata, La Plata
Referee: Sergio Pezzotta (Argentina)

Brazil	Paraguay

GK	1	Júlio César
RB	13	Maicon	(yellow card) 60'
CB	3	Lúcio (c)
CB	4	Thiago Silva
LB	6	André Santos	(yellow card) 57'
CM	5	Lucas Leiva	(red card) 103'
CM	8	Ramires
RW	7	Robinho
AM	10	Ganso		(substituted off) 100'
LW	11	Neymar		(substituted off) 80'
CF	9	Alexandre Pato		(substituted off) 112'
Substitutions:
FW	19	Fred		(substituted on) 80'
FW	18	Lucas Moura		(substituted on) 100'
MF	16	Elano		(substituted on) 112'
Manager:
Mano Menezes

GK	1	Justo Villar (c)
RB	2	Darío Verón
CB	14	Paulo da Silva
CB	5	Antolín Alcaraz	(red card) 103'
LB	17	Aureliano Torres		(substituted off) 71'
DM	15	Víctor Cáceres
CM	16	Cristian Riveros
RW	13	Enrique Vera	(yellow card) 22'	(substituted off) 64'
LW	21	Marcelo Estigarribia	(yellow card) 111'
CF	18	Nelson Valdez
CF	19	Lucas Barrios		(substituted off) 83'
Substitutions:
MF	8	Édgar Barreto	(yellow card) 65'	(substituted on) 64'
DF	4	Elvis Marecos	(yellow card) 72'	(substituted on) 71'
FW	23	Hernán Pérez		(substituted on) 83'
Manager:
Gerardo Martino (Argentina)

Man of the Match:
Justo Villar (Paraguay)

Assistant referees:
Ricardo Casas (Argentina)
Efraín Castro (Bolivia)
Fourth official:
Raúl Orosco (Bolivia)

=== Chile vs Venezuela ===
17 July 2011
19:15

Chile	1–2	Venezuela
Suazo 69'	Report	Vizcarrondo 34'; Cichero 80'

Estadio del Bicentenario, San Juan
Referee: Carlos Vera (Ecuador)

Chile	Venezuela

GK	1	Claudio Bravo (c)
CB	5	Pablo Contreras	(yellow card) 45+1'
CB	3	Waldo Ponce
CB	18	Gonzalo Jara		(substituted off) 60'
CM	17	Gary Medel	(yellow card) 40' (yellow-red card) 82'
CM	8	Arturo Vidal	(yellow card) 79'
RW	4	Mauricio Isla	(yellow card) 26'
AM	11	Luis Antonio Jiménez		(substituted off) 83'
LW	6	Carlos Carmona		(substituted off) 46'
CF	7	Alexis Sánchez
CF	9	Humberto Suazo
Substitutions:
MF	10	Jorge Valdivia		(substituted on) 46'
FW	22	Esteban Paredes		(substituted on) 60'
FW	19	Carlos Muñoz		(substituted on) 83'
Manager:
Claudio Borghi (Argentina)

GK	1	Renny Vega
RB	16	Roberto Rosales
CB	20	Grenddy Perozo
CB	4	Oswaldo Vizcarrondo
LB	6	Gabriel Cichero
RM	11	César González	(yellow card) 36'	(substituted off) 89'
CM	14	Franklin Lucena	(yellow card) 80'
CM	8	Tomás Rincón	(red card) 90+3'
LM	18	Juan Arango (c)
CF	9	Giancarlo Maldonado		(substituted off) 63'
CF	7	Miku		(substituted off) 59'
Substitutions:
FW	23	Salomón Rondón		(substituted on) 59'
MF	13	Luis Manuel Seijas		(substituted on) 63'
FW	15	Alejandro Moreno		(substituted on) 89'
Manager:
César Farías

Man of the Match:
Oswaldo Vizcarrondo (Venezuela)

Assistant referees:
Luis Alvarado (Ecuador)
Luis Abadie (Peru)
Fourth official:
Víctor Hugo Rivera (Peru)

== Semi-finals ==
=== Peru vs Uruguay ===
19 July 2011
21:45

Peru	0–2	Uruguay
	Report	Suárez 52', 57'

Estadio Ciudad de La Plata, La Plata
Referee: Raúl Orosco (Bolivia)

Peru	Uruguay

GK	1	Raúl Fernández
RB	17	Giancarlo Carmona
CB	3	Santiago Acasiete
CB	2	Alberto Rodríguez
LB	4	Walter Vílchez
RM	16	Luis Advíncula		(substituted off) 60'
CM	19	Yoshimar Yotún	(yellow card) 1'	(substituted off) 53'
CM	5	Adán Balbín	(yellow card) 59'	(substituted off) 90'
CM	10	Rinaldo Cruzado
LM	6	Juan Manuel Vargas (c)	(red card) 68'
CF	9	Paolo Guerrero
Substitutions:
FW	18	William Chiroque		(substituted on) 53'
MF	11	Carlos Lobatón	(yellow card) 74'	(substituted on) 60'
MF	7	Josepmir Ballón		(substituted on) 90'
Manager:
Sergio Markarian (Uruguay)

GK	1	Fernando Muslera
RB	16	Maxi Pereira
CB	2	Diego Lugano (c)	(yellow card) 66'
CB	4	Sebastián Coates
LB	22	Martín Cáceres
RM	20	Álvaro González
CM	5	Walter Gargano	(yellow card) 26'	(substituted off) 70'
CM	17	Egidio Arévalo Ríos
LM	11	Álvaro Pereira
CF	10	Diego Forlán
CF	9	Luis Suárez	(yellow card) 12'	(substituted off) 70'
Substitutions:
MF	8	Sebastián Eguren		(substituted on) 70'
FW	18	Abel Hernández		(substituted on) 70'
Manager:
Óscar Tabárez

Man of the Match:
Luis Suárez (Uruguay)

Assistant referees:
Efraín Castro (Bolivia)
Marvin Torrentera (Mexico)
Fourth official:
Wilmar Roldán (Colombia)

=== Paraguay vs Venezuela ===
20 July 2011
21:45

Paraguay	0–0 (a.e.t.)	Venezuela
	Report
Penalties
Ortigoza (penalty scored); Barrios (penalty scored); Riveros (penalty scored); Martínez (penalty scored); Verón (penalty scored)	5–3	(penalty scored) Maldonado; (penalty scored) Rey; (penalty missed) Lucena; (penalty scored) Miku

Estadio Malvinas Argentinas, Mendoza
Referee: Francisco Chacón (Mexico)

Paraguay	Venezuela

GK	1	Justo Villar (c)
RB	6	Marcos Cáceres
CB	14	Paulo da Silva
CB	2	Darío Verón	(yellow card) 107'
LB	3	Iván Piris
CM	20	Néstor Ortigoza
CM	16	Cristian Riveros
RW	8	Édgar Barreto		(substituted off) 70'
LW	11	Jonathan Santana	(yellow card) 78' (yellow-red card) 102'
CF	18	Nelson Valdez		(substituted off) 73'
CF	19	Lucas Barrios
Substitutions:
MF	21	Marcelo Estigarribia		(substituted on) 70'
FW	9	Roque Santa Cruz		(substituted on) 73'	(substituted off) 80'
MF	10	Osvaldo Martínez		(substituted on) 80'
Manager:
Gerardo Martino (Argentina)

GK	1	Renny Vega
RB	16	Roberto Rosales	(yellow card) 55'
CB	20	Grenddy Perozo		(substituted off) 46'
CB	4	Oswaldo Vizcarrondo
LB	6	Gabriel Cichero
RM	11	César González		(substituted off) 84'
CM	14	Franklin Lucena
CM	5	Giácomo Di Giorgi
LM	18	Juan Arango (c)
CF	15	Alejandro Moreno		(substituted off) 72'
CF	23	Salomón Rondón
Substitutions:
DF	3	José Manuel Rey		(substituted on) 46'
FW	7	Miku		(substituted on) 72'
FW	9	Giancarlo Maldonado		(substituted on) 84'
Manager:
César Farías

Man of the Match:
Juan Arango (Venezuela)

Assistant referees:
Leonel Leal (Costa Rica)
Humberto Clavijo (Colombia)
Fourth official:
Wálter Quesada (Costa Rica)

== Third place play-off ==
23 July 2011
16:00

Peru	4–1	Venezuela
Chiroque 41'; Guerrero 63', 89', 90+2'	Report	Arango 77'

Estadio Ciudad de La Plata, La Plata
Referee: Wilmar Roldán (Colombia)

Peru	Venezuela

GK	1	Raúl Fernández
RB	13	Renzo Revoredo
CB	21	Christian Ramos
CB	2	Alberto Rodríguez
LB	15	Aldo Corzo
RM	5	Adán Balbín	(yellow card) 66'
CM	11	Carlos Lobatón		(substituted off) 60'
LM	10	Rinaldo Cruzado	(yellow card) 37'	(substituted off) 78'
RW	18	William Chiroque
LW	19	Yoshimar Yotún
CF	9	Paolo Guerrero (c)
Substitutions:
MF	8	Michael Guevara		(substituted on) 60'
FW	16	Luis Advíncula		(substituted on) 78'
Manager:
Sergio Markarian (Uruguay)

GK	1	Renny Vega
RB	16	Roberto Rosales
CB	3	José Manuel Rey	(yellow card) 49'
CB	4	Oswaldo Vizcarrondo
LB	6	Gabriel Cichero	(yellow card) 84'
DM	8	Tomás Rincón (c)	(red card) 58'
RM	11	César González		(substituted off) 67'
LM	13	Luis Seijas		(substituted off) 46'
AM	10	Yohandry Orozco
CF	9	Giancarlo Maldonado	(yellow card) 86'
CF	7	Miku		(substituted off) 61'
Substitutions:
MF	14	Franklin Lucena		(substituted on) 46'
FW	23	Salomón Rondón		(substituted on) 61'
MF	18	Juan Arango		(substituted on) 67'
Manager:
César Farías

Man of the Match:
Paolo Guerrero (Peru)

Assistant referees:
Humberto Clavijo (Colombia)
Luis Alvarado (Ecuador)
Fourth official:
Carlos Vera (Ecuador)

== Final ==
24 July 2011
16:00

Uruguay	3–0	Paraguay
Suárez 11'; Forlán 41', 89'	Report

Estadio Monumental Antonio Vespucio Liberti, Buenos Aires
Referee: Sálvio Fagundes (Brazil)

Uruguay	Paraguay

GK	1	Fernando Muslera
RB	16	Maxi Pereira	(yellow card) 29'
CB	2	Diego Lugano (c)
CB	4	Sebastián Coates	(yellow card) 85'
LB	22	Martín Cáceres	(yellow card) 17'	(substituted off) 88'
RM	20	Álvaro González
CM	15	Diego Pérez	(yellow card) 24'	(substituted off) 69'
CM	17	Egidio Arévalo
LM	11	Álvaro Pereira		(substituted off) 63'
CF	10	Diego Forlán
CF	9	Luis Suárez
Substitutions:
FW	21	Edinson Cavani		(substituted on) 63'
MF	8	Sebastián Eguren		(substituted on) 69'
DF	3	Diego Godín		(substituted on) 88'
Manager:
Óscar Tabárez

GK	1	Justo Villar (c)
RB	3	Iván Piris
CB	14	Paulo da Silva
CB	2	Darío Verón
LB	4	Elvis Marecos
RM	13	Enrique Vera	(yellow card) 57'	(substituted off) 64'
CM	20	Néstor Ortigoza
CM	15	Víctor Cáceres	(yellow card) 26'	(substituted off) 64'
LM	16	Cristian Riveros
CF	18	Nelson Valdez
CF	7	Pablo Zeballos		(substituted off) 76'
Substitutions:
MF	21	Marcelo Estigarribia		(substituted on) 64'
FW	23	Hernán Pérez		(substituted on) 64'
FW	19	Lucas Barrios		(substituted on) 76'
Manager:
(Argentina) Gerardo Martino

Man of the Match:
Luis Suárez (Uruguay)

Assistant referees:
Marcio Santiago (Brazil)
Francisco Mondría (Chile)
Fourth official:
Enrique Osses (Chile)
