= 2011 Copa América final =

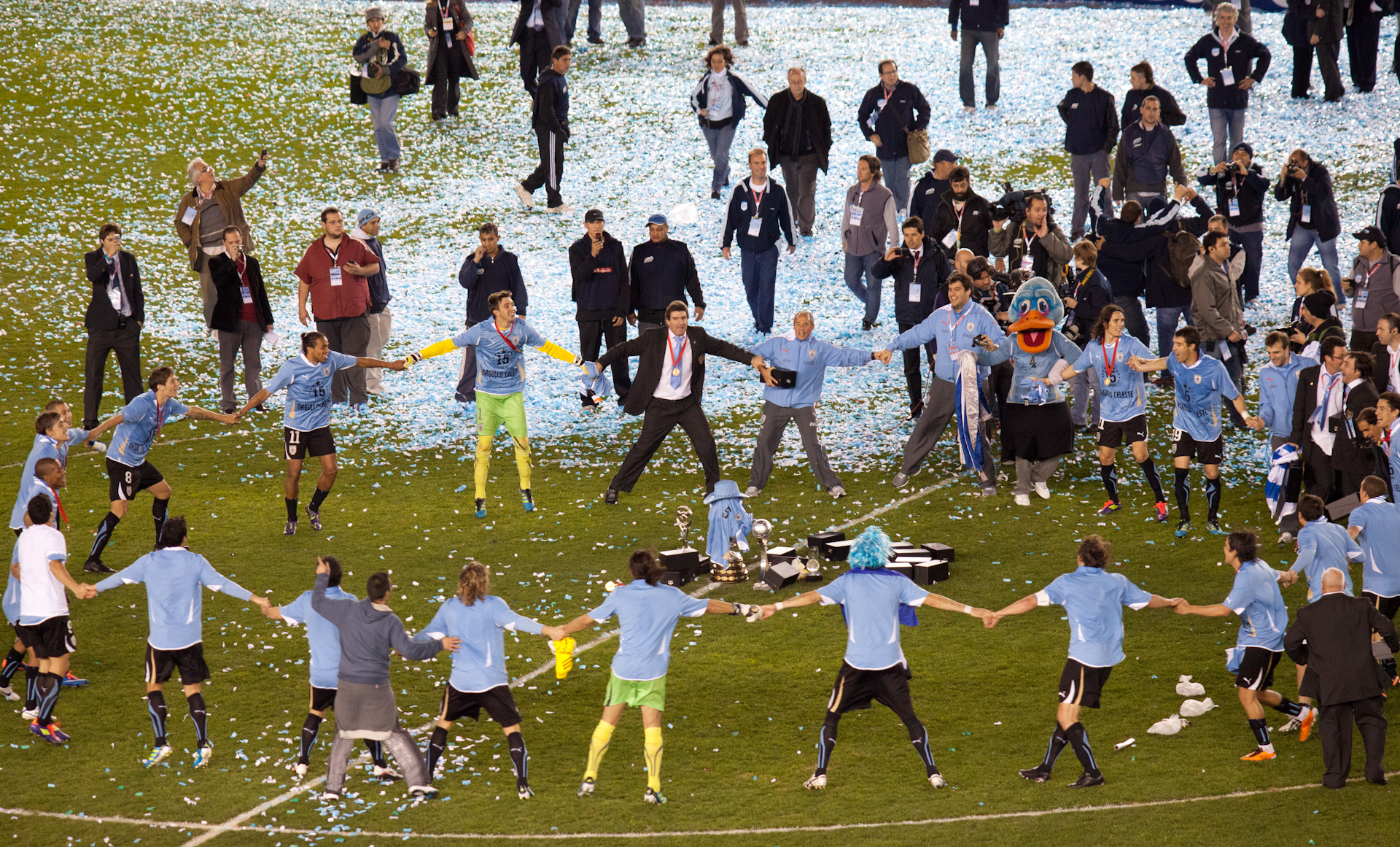
- The celebration of the Uruguayan players
- Event: 2011 Copa América
Uruguay	Paraguay
(Uruguay)	(Paraguay)
3	0
- Date: 24 July 2011
- Venue: Estadio Monumental Antonio Vespucio Liberti, Buenos Aires
- Man of the Match: Luis Suárez (Uruguay)
- Referee: Sálvio Fagundes (Brazil)
- Weather: Clear; 14 °C (57 °F)

The 2011 Copa América final was the final match of the 2011 Copa América, an international football tournament that was played in Argentina from 1 to 24 July 2011. The match was played on 24 July at Estadio Monumental Antonio Vespucio Liberti in Buenos Aires, between Uruguay and Paraguay.

Uruguay won the match 3–0 to earn their 15th Copa América; Paraguay, as the tournament runner-up, earned the Copa Bolivia. With the win, Uruguay earned the right to represent CONMEBOL in the 2013 FIFA Confederations Cup in Brazil.

== Background ==
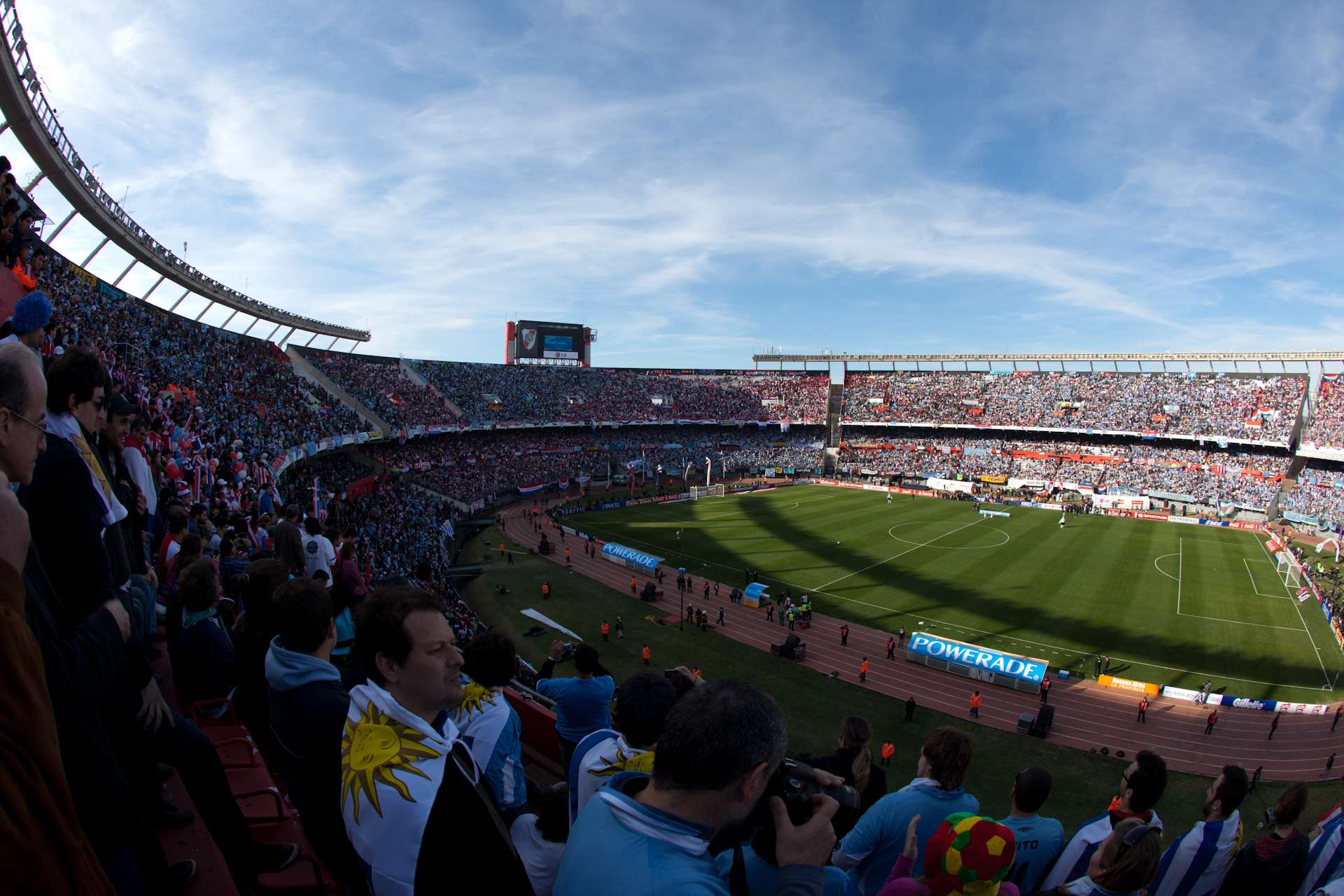
The Estadio Monumental of Buenos Aires before the match

The final marked the first time since 2001 that neither Argentina and Brazil competed against each other for the title. Both Uruguay and Paraguay entered the match having previously won the competition multiple times. Uruguay held the joint record of 14 Copa América titles, having had last won it in 1995. Their last final appearance was in 1999, when they were defeated by Brazil.

Paraguay is a two-time winner of the competition, having last won the tournament in 1979. That year also marked the last time Paraguay made it to the final of the tournament. Paraguay reached the final without winning a single game in the tournament.

== Route to the final ==
Uruguay
Round
Paraguay
Opponent
Result
Group stage
Opponent
Result
Peru
1–1
Match 1
Ecuador
0–0
Chile
1–1
Match 2
Brazil
2–2
Mexico
1–0
Match 3
Venezuela
3–3

Team	Pld	W	D	L	GF	GA	GD	Pts
Chile	3	2	1	0	4	2	+2	7
Uruguay	3	1	2	0	3	2	+1	5
Peru	3	1	1	1	2	2	0	4
Mexico	3	0	0	3	1	4	−3	0

Final standings

Team	Pld	W	D	L	GF	GA	GD	Pts
Brazil	3	1	2	0	6	4	+2	5
Venezuela	3	1	2	0	4	3	+1	5
Paraguay	3	0	3	0	5	5	0	3
Ecuador	3	0	1	2	2	5	−3	1

Opponent
Result
Knockout stage
Opponent
Result
Argentina
1–1 (a.e.t.)
(5–4 pen.)
Quarter-finals
Brazil
0–0 (a.e.t.)
(2–0 pen.)
Peru
2–0
Semi-finals
Venezuela
0–0 (a.e.t.)
(5–3 pen.)

== Match details ==
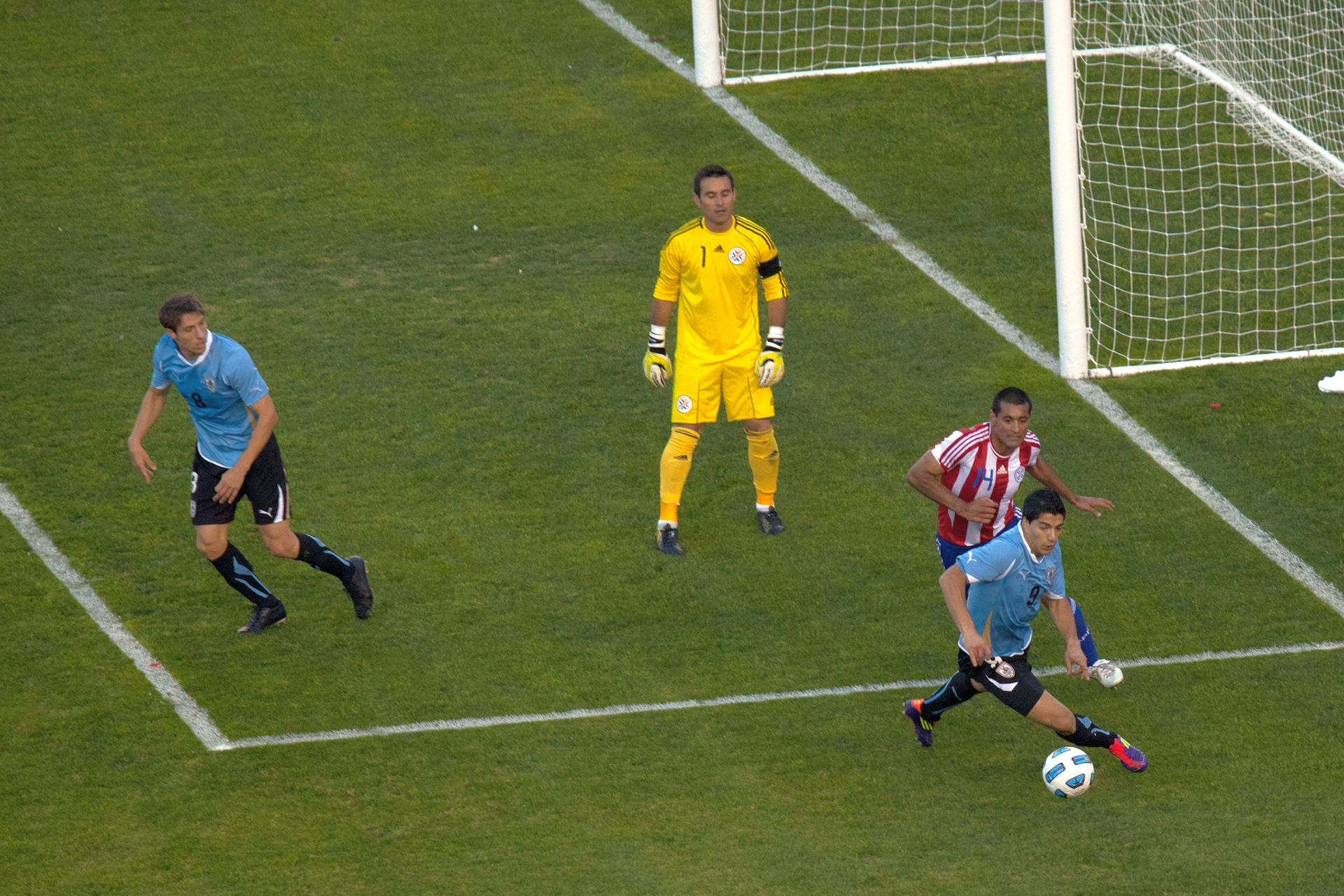
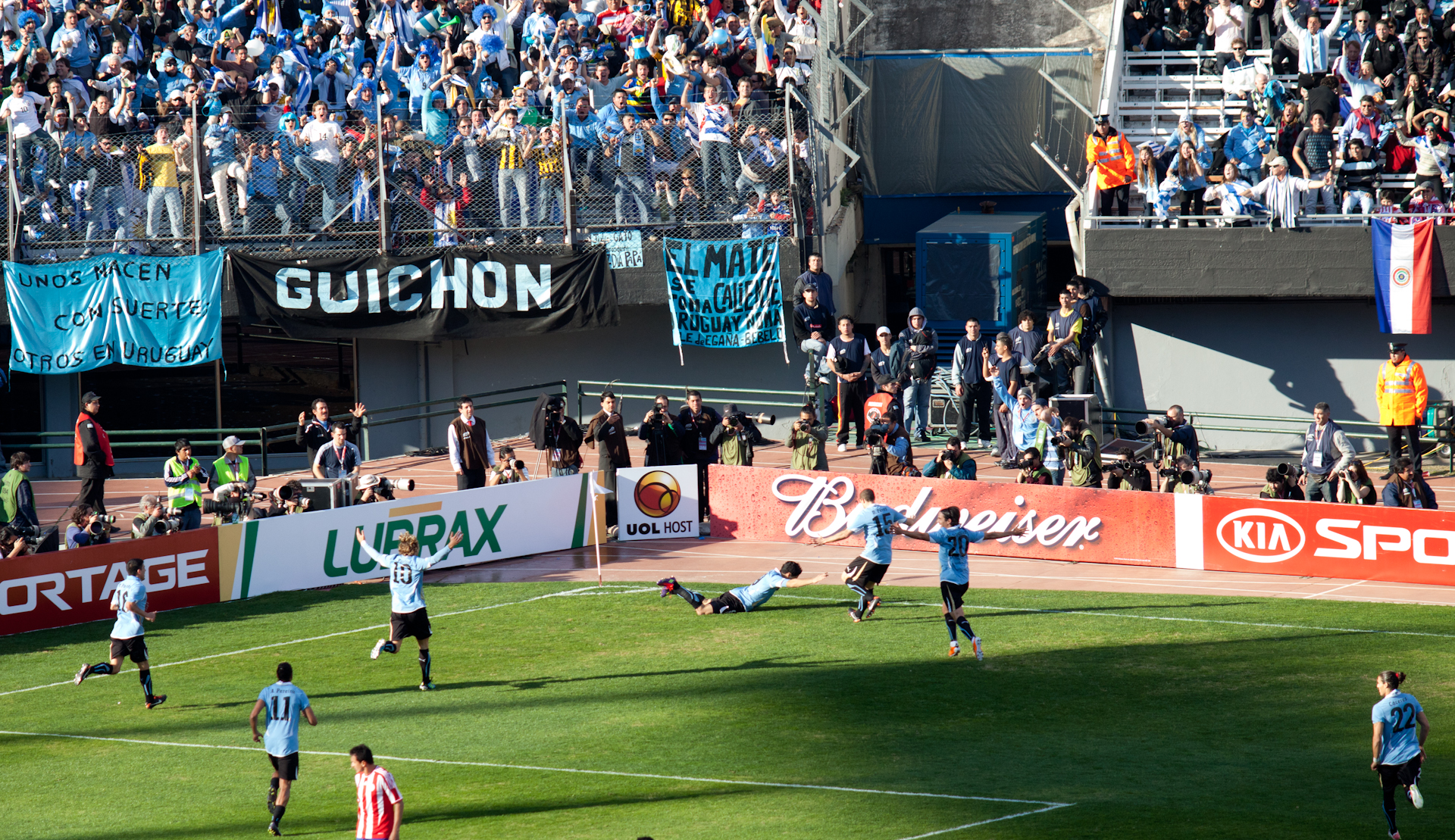
Two moments of the match in Buenos Aires; at right, Luis Suárez celebrating his goal
24 July 2011
16:00 UTC−3

Uruguay	3–0	Paraguay
Suárez 11'; Forlán 41', 89'	Report

Estadio Monumental, Buenos Aires
Attendance: 65,921
Referee: Sálvio Spínola (Brazil)

Uruguay	Paraguay

GK	1	Fernando Muslera
RB	16	Maxi Pereira	(yellow card) 29'
CB	2	Diego Lugano (c)
CB	4	Sebastián Coates	(yellow card) 85'
LB	22	Martín Cáceres	(yellow card) 17'	(substituted off) 88'
RM	20	Álvaro González
CM	15	Diego Pérez	(yellow card) 24'	(substituted off) 69'
CM	17	Egidio Arévalo Ríos
LM	11	Álvaro Pereira		(substituted off) 63'
CF	10	Diego Forlán
CF	9	Luis Suárez
Substitutions:
FW	21	Edinson Cavani		(substituted on) 63'
MF	8	Sebastián Eguren		(substituted on) 69'
DF	3	Diego Godín		(substituted on) 88'
Manager:
Óscar Tabárez

GK	1	Justo Villar (c)
RB	3	Iván Piris
CB	14	Paulo da Silva
CB	2	Darío Verón
LB	4	Elvis Marecos
RM	13	Enrique Vera	(yellow card) 57'	(substituted off) 64'
CM	20	Néstor Ortigoza
CM	15	Víctor Cáceres	(yellow card) 26'	(substituted off) 64'
LM	16	Cristian Riveros
CF	18	Nelson Valdez
CF	7	Pablo Zeballos		(substituted off) 76'
Substitutions:
MF	21	Marcelo Estigarribia		(substituted on) 64'
FW	23	Hernán Pérez		(substituted on) 64'
FW	19	Lucas Barrios		(substituted on) 76'
Manager:
(Argentina) Gerardo Martino

Man of the Match:
Luis Suárez (Uruguay)

Assistant referees:
Marcio Santiago (Brazil)
Francisco Mondría (Chile)
Fourth official:
Enrique Osses (Chile)
