= 2011 Copa América Group C =

Group in football tournament

Group C of the 2011 Copa América was one of the three groups of competing nations in the 2011 Copa América. It comprised Chile, Mexico, Peru, and Uruguay. Group play ran from 4 to 12 July 2011.

Chile won the group and faced Venezuela—the runners-up of Group B— in the quarter-finals. Uruguay finished second and faced Argentina—the runners-up of Group A—in the quarter-finals. Peru finished third in the group and also as the best third-place finisher in the first stage. They faced Colombia—the winners of Group A—in the quarter-finals. Mexico were the only team from the group to be eliminated in the first round.

== Standings ==
Team	Pld	W	D	L	GF	GA	GD	Pts
Chile	3	2	1	0	4	2	+2	7
Uruguay	3	1	2	0	3	2	+1	5
Peru	3	1	1	1	2	2	0	4
Mexico	3	0	0	3	1	4	−3	0

Teams that advanced to the quarter-finals
- Group winners
- Group runners-up
- Best two third-placed teams among all groups

All times are in local, Argentina Time (UTC−03:00).

== Uruguay vs Peru ==
4 July 2011
19:15

Uruguay	1–1	Peru
Suárez 45'	Report	Guerrero 23'

Estadio del Bicentenario, San Juan
Referee: Wilmar Roldán (Colombia)

Uruguay	Peru

GK	1	Fernando Muslera
RB	16	Maxi Pereira
CB	2	Diego Lugano (c)
CB	6	Mauricio Victorino
LB	22	Martín Cáceres	(yellow card) 81'
CM	15	Diego Pérez
CM	17	Egidio Arévalo Ríos
RW	10	Diego Forlán
AM	14	Nicolás Lodeiro		(substituted off) 78'
LW	21	Edinson Cavani		(substituted off) 78'
CF	9	Luis Suárez
Substitutions:
MF	7	Cristian Rodríguez		(substituted on) 78'
FW	18	Abel Hernández		(substituted on) 78'
Manager:
Óscar Tabárez

GK	1	Raúl Fernández
RB	13	Renzo Revoredo
CB	3	Santiago Acasiete	(yellow card) 50'
CB	2	Alberto Rodríguez
LB	4	Walter Vílchez (c)
CM	5	Adan Balbín
CM	10	Rinaldo Cruzado	(yellow card) 81'
RW	16	Luis Advíncula		(substituted off) 90+1'
AM	8	Michael Guevara		(substituted off) 57'
LW	19	Yoshimar Yotún		(substituted off) 59'
CF	9	Paolo Guerrero	(yellow card) 24'
Substitutions:
MF	11	Carlos Lobatón		(substituted on) 57'
MF	6	Juan Manuel Vargas	(yellow card) 83'	(substituted on) 59'
FW	18	William Chiroque		(substituted on) 90+1'
Manager:
Sergio Markarián (Uruguay)

Man of the Match:
Paolo Guerrero (Peru)

Assistant referees:
Humberto Clavijo (Colombia)
Hernán Maidana (Argentina)
Fourth official:
Sálvio Fagundes (Brazil)

== Chile vs Mexico ==
4 July 2011
21:45

Chile	2–1	Mexico
Paredes 66'; Vidal 72'	Report	Araújo 40'

Estadio del Bicentenario, San Juan
Referee: Juan Soto (Venezuela)

Chile	Mexico

GK	1	Claudio Bravo (c)	(yellow card) 74'
CB	5	Pablo Contreras
CB	3	Waldo Ponce
CB	18	Gonzalo Jara
CM	17	Gary Medel
CM	8	Arturo Vidal
RW	4	Mauricio Isla
AM	14	Matías Fernández		(substituted off) 83'
LW	15	Jean Beausejour		(substituted off) 59'
CF	7	Alexis Sánchez
CF	9	Humberto Suazo		(substituted off) 90+1'
Substitutions:
FW	22	Esteban Paredes		(substituted on) 59'
MF	6	Carlos Carmona		(substituted on) 83'
MF	13	Marco Estrada		(substituted on) 90+1'
Manager:
Claudio Borghi (Argentina)

GK	1	Luis Ernesto Michel (c)
RB	22	Paul Aguilar	(yellow card) 67'
CB	14	Nestor Araújo
CB	19	Héctor Reynoso
CB	21	Hiram Mier
LB	5	Dárvin Chávez
RM	23	Diego Antonio Reyes	(yellow card) 25'
CM	15	Jorge Enríquez
LM	11	Javier Aquino	(yellow card) 21'	(substituted off) 74'
CF	10	Giovani dos Santos
CF	9	Rafael Márquez Lugo		(substituted off) 88'
Substitutions:
FW	18	Oribe Peralta		(substituted on) 74'
MF	17	Edgar Ivan Pacheco	(yellow card) 90'	(substituted on) 88'
Manager:
Luis Fernando Tena

Man of the Match:
Alexis Sánchez (Chile)

Assistant referees:
Luis Sánchez (Venezuela)
Leonel Leal (Costa Rica)
Fourth official:
Wálter Quesada (Costa Rica)

== Uruguay vs Chile ==
8 July 2011
19:15

Uruguay	1–1	Chile
Á. Pereira 53'	Report	Sánchez 64'

Estadio Malvinas Argentinas, Mendoza
Referee: Carlos Amarilla (Paraguay)

Uruguay	Chile

GK	1	Fernando Muslera
RB	16	Maxi Pereira		(substituted off) 85'
CB	2	Diego Lugano (c)
CB	4	Sebastián Coates	(yellow card) 86'
LB	22	Martín Cáceres	(yellow card) 49'
RM	15	Diego Pérez
CM	17	Egidio Arévalo Ríos		(substituted off) 79'
LM	11	Álvaro Pereira	(yellow card) 11'
RW	21	Edinson Cavani		(substituted off) 46'
LW	9	Luis Suárez	(yellow card) 37'
CF	10	Diego Forlán
Substitutions:
MF	20	Álvaro González	(yellow card) 83'	(substituted on) 46'
MF	14	Nicolás Lodeiro		(substituted on) 79'
MF	8	Sebastián Eguren		(substituted on) 85'
Manager:
Óscar Tabárez

GK	1	Claudio Bravo (c)
CB	5	Pablo Contreras	(yellow card) 23'
CB	3	Waldo Ponce
CB	18	Gonzalo Jara	(yellow card) 37'	(substituted off) 60'
RM	4	Mauricio Isla
CM	17	Gary Medel
LM	8	Arturo Vidal	(yellow card) 70'
AM	11	Luis Jiménez
RW	7	Alexis Sánchez	(yellow card) 57'
LW	15	Jean Beausejour		(substituted off) 73'
CF	9	Humberto Suazo		(substituted off) 73'
Substitutions:
MF	10	Jorge Valdivia		(substituted on) 60'
MF	6	Carlos Carmona		(substituted on) 73'
FW	22	Esteban Paredes		(substituted on) 73'
Manager:
Claudio Borghi (Argentina)

Man of the Match:
Alexis Sánchez (Chile)

Assistant referees:
Nicolás Yegros (Paraguay)
Efraín Castro (Bolivia)
Fourth official:
Raúl Orosco (Bolivia)

== Peru vs Mexico ==
8 July 2011
21:45

Peru	1–0	Mexico
Guerrero 82'	Report

Estadio Malvinas Argentinas, Mendoza
Referee: Sergio Pezzotta (Argentina)

Peru	Mexico

GK	1	Raúl Fernández
RB	17	Giancarlo Carmona
CB	3	Santiago Acasiete
CB	2	Alberto Rodríguez
LB	4	Walter Vílchez
RM	5	Adán Balbín
CM	10	Rinaldo Cruzado	(substituted off) 76'
CM	11	Carlos Lobatón	(substituted off) 85'
LM	6	Juan Manuel Vargas (c)
CF	9	Paolo Guerrero
CF	16	Luis Advíncula	(substituted off) 46'
Substitutions:
DF	19	Yoshimar Yotún	(substituted on) 46'
MF	8	Michael Guevara	(substituted on) 76'
MF	7	Josepmir Ballón	(substituted on) 85'
Manager:
Sergio Markarián (Uruguay)

GK	1	Luis Ernesto Michel (c)
RB	22	Paul Aguilar		(substituted off) 46'
CB	14	Néstor Araujo
CB	19	Héctor Reynoso	(yellow card) 71'
CB	21	Hiram Mier	(yellow card) 58'
LB	5	Dárvin Chávez		(substituted off) 73'
RM	23	Diego Antonio Reyes
CM	11	Javier Aquino		(substituted off) 85'
LM	15	Jorge Enríquez
CF	10	Giovani dos Santos
CF	9	Rafael Márquez Lugo
Substitutions:
MF	17	Édgar Pacheco		(substituted on) 46'
DF	16	Miguel Ángel Ponce		(substituted on) 73'
FW	18	Oribe Peralta		(substituted on) 85'
Manager:
Luis Fernando Tena

Man of the Match:
Juan Manuel Vargas (Peru)

Assistant referees:
Ricardo Casas (Argentina)
Diego Bonfa (Argentina)
Fourth official:
Sálvio Fagundes (Brazil)

== Chile vs Peru ==
12 July 2011
19:15

Chile	1–0	Peru
Carrillo 90+2' (o.g.)	Report

Estadio Malvinas Argentinas, Mendoza
Referee: Sálvio Fagundes (Brazil)

Chile	Peru

GK	12	Miguel Pinto
CB	3	Waldo Ponce
CB	18	Gonzalo Jara
CB	13	Marco Estrada	(yellow card) 87'
RM	16	Gonzalo Fierro		(substituted off) 57'
CM	6	Carlos Carmona
CM	2	Francisco Silva		(substituted off) 77'
LM	15	Jean Beausejour	(red card) 61'
AM	11	Luis Jiménez
CF	9	Humberto Suazo (c)
CF	22	Esteban Paredes		(substituted off) 57'
Substitutions:
FW	7	Alexis Sánchez		(substituted on) 57'
MF	10	Jorge Valdivia	(yellow card) 90+3'	(substituted on) 57'
MF	17	Gary Medel		(substituted on) 77'
Manager:
Claudio Borghi (Argentina)

GK	12	Salomón Libman	(yellow card) 82'
RB	13	Renzo Revoredo	(yellow card) 21'
CB	21	Christian Ramos	(yellow card) 60'
CB	3	Santiago Acasiete (c)		(substituted off) 46'
CB	17	Giancarlo Carmona	(red card) 61'
LB	15	Aldo Corzo	(yellow card) 11'
DM	22	Antonio Gonzales		(substituted off) 76'
RM	7	Josepmir Ballón
LM	8	Michael Guevara		(substituted off) 69'
CF	18	William Chiroque
CF	14	Raúl Ruidíaz
Substitutions:
DF	4	Walter Vílchez		(substituted on) 46'
MF	11	Carlos Lobatón		(substituted on) 69'
FW	20	André Carrillo		(substituted on) 76'
Manager:
Sergio Markarián (Uruguay)

Man of the Match:
William Chiroque (Peru)

Assistant referees:
Marcio Santiago (Brazil)
Humberto Clavijo (Colombia)
Fourth official:
Wilmar Roldán (Colombia)

== Uruguay vs Mexico ==
12 July 2011
21:45

Uruguay	1–0	Mexico
Á. Pereira 14'	Report

Estadio Ciudad de La Plata, La Plata
Referee: Raúl Orosco (Bolivia)

Uruguay	Mexico

GK	1	Fernando Muslera
RB	16	Maxi Pereira
CB	2	Diego Lugano (c)
CB	4	Sebastián Coates	(yellow card) 90+1'
LB	11	Álvaro Pereira
RM	20	Álvaro González		(substituted off) 68'
CM	15	Diego Pérez
CM	17	Egidio Arévalo Ríos
LM	7	Cristian Rodríguez		(substituted off) 83'
CF	10	Diego Forlán		(substituted off) 89'
CF	9	Luis Suárez
Substitutions:
MF	14	Nicolás Lodeiro		(substituted on) 68'
MF	8	Sebastián Eguren		(substituted on) 83'
FW	13	Sebastián Abreu		(substituted on) 89'
Manager:
(Uruguay) Óscar Tabárez

GK	1	Luis Ernesto Michel (c)
RB	22	Paul Aguilar	(yellow card) 40'	(substituted off) 46'
CB	21	Hiram Mier	(yellow card) 63'
CB	19	Héctor Reynoso	(yellow card) 55'
LB	5	Dárvin Chávez
RM	14	Néstor Araujo
CM	23	Diego Antonio Reyes
CM	15	Jorge Enríquez
LM	16	Miguel Ángel Ponce		(substituted off) 70'
CF	10	Giovani dos Santos		(substituted off) 46'
CF	9	Rafael Márquez Lugo	(yellow card) 80'
Substitutions:
MF	11	Javier Aquino		(substituted on) 46'
FW	18	Oribe Peralta		(substituted on) 46'
MF	17	Édgar Pacheco		(substituted on) 70'
Manager:
(Mexico) Luis Fernando Tena

Man of the Match:
Diego Forlán (Uruguay)

Assistant referees:
Efraín Castro (Bolivia)
Luis Alvarado (Ecuador)
Fourth official:
Carlos Vera (Ecuador)
