= 2011 Copa América Group B =

Group in football tournament

Group B of the 2011 Copa América was one of the three groups of competing nations in the 2011 Copa América. It comprised Brazil, Ecuador, Paraguay, and Venezuela. Group play ran from 3 to 13 July 2011.

Brazil won the group and faced Paraguay—the group's third-place finishers and the second-best third-place finishers in the first stage—again in the quarter-finals. Venezuela finished second and faced Chile, the winners of Group C. Ecuador finished fourth and were eliminated.

== Standings ==
Team	Pld	W	D	L	GF	GA	GD	Pts
Brazil	3	1	2	0	6	4	+2	5
Venezuela	3	1	2	0	4	3	+1	5
Paraguay	3	0	3	0	5	5	0	3
Ecuador	3	0	1	2	2	5	−3	1

Teams that advanced to the quarter-finals
- Group winners
- Group runners-up
- Best two third-placed teams among all groups

All times are in local, Argentina Time (UTC−03:00).

== Brazil vs Venezuela ==
3 July 2011
16:00

Brazil	0–0	Venezuela
	Report

Estadio Ciudad de La Plata, La Plata
Referee: Raúl Orosco (Bolivia)

Brazil	Venezuela

GK	1	Júlio César
RB	2	Dani Alves
CB	3	Lúcio (c)
CB	4	Thiago Silva	(yellow card) 37'
LB	6	André Santos
CM	5	Lucas Leiva
CM	8	Ramires		(substituted off) 75'
RW	7	Robinho		(substituted off) 64'
AM	10	Ganso
LW	11	Neymar
CF	9	Alexandre Pato		(substituted off) 75'
Substitutions:
FW	19	Fred		(substituted on) 64'
FW	18	Lucas Moura		(substituted on) 75'
MF	16	Elano		(substituted on) 75'
Manager:
Mano Menezes

GK	1	Renny Vega
RB	16	Roberto Rosales
CB	20	Grenddy Perozo
CB	4	Oswaldo Vizcarrondo
LB	6	Gabriel Cichero
RM	11	César González	(yellow card) 63'	(substituted off) 85'
CM	14	Franklin Lucena
CM	8	Tomás Rincón
LM	18	Juan Arango (c)
CF	23	Salomón Rondón	(yellow card) 61'	(substituted off) 63'
CF	7	Miku		(substituted off) 78'
Substitutions:
FW	15	Alejandro Moreno	(yellow card) 90+3'	(substituted on) 63'
FW	9	Giancarlo Maldonado		(substituted on) 78'
MF	5	Giácomo Di Giorgi		(substituted on) 85'
Manager:
César Farías

Man of the Match:
Neymar (Brazil)

Assistant referees:
Efráin Castro (Bolivia)
Marvin Torrente (Mexico)
Fourth official:
Francisco Chacón (Mexico)

== Paraguay vs Ecuador ==
3 July 2011
18:30

Paraguay	0–0	Ecuador
	Report

Estadio Brigadier General Estanislao López, Santa Fe
Referee: Sergio Pezzotta (Argentina)

Paraguay	Ecuador

GK	1	Justo Villar (c)
RB	3	Iván Piris	(yellow card) 51'
CB	14	Paulo da Silva
CB	2	Darío Verón
LB	17	Aureliano Torres
CM	20	Néstor Ortigoza
CM	16	Cristian Riveros
RW	8	Édgar Barreto		(substituted off) 37'
LW	21	Marcelo Estigarribia
CF	9	Roque Santa Cruz		(substituted off) 83'
CF	19	Lucas Barrios		(substituted off) 73'
Substitutions:
MF	13	Enrique Vera		(substituted on) 37'
FW	18	Nelson Valdez		(substituted on) 73'
MF	7	Pablo Zeballos	(yellow card) 90'	(substituted on) 83'
Manager:
Gerardo Martino (Argentina)

GK	1	Marcelo Elizaga
RB	13	Néicer Reasco
CB	19	Norberto Araujo
CB	3	Frickson Erazo
LB	10	Walter Ayoví (c)
DM	6	Christian Noboa
CM	14	Segundo Castillo
RW	16	Antonio Valencia	(substituted off) 46'
LW	8	Édison Méndez	(substituted off) 81'
CF	11	Christian Benítez
CF	9	Felipe Caicedo
Substitutions:
MF	7	Michael Arroyo	(substituted on) 46'
MF	15	David Quiroz	(substituted on) 81'
Manager:
Reinaldo Rueda (Colombia)

Man of the Match:
Marcelo Elizaga (Ecuador)

Assistant referees:
Ricardo Casas (Argentina)
Luis Abadie (Peru)
Fourth official:
Víctor Hugo Rivera (Peru)

== Brazil vs Paraguay ==
9 July 2011
16:00

Brazil	2–2	Paraguay
Jádson 38'; Fred 89'	Report	Santa Cruz 54'; Valdez 66'

Estadio Mario Alberto Kempes, Córdoba
Referee: Wilmar Roldán (Colombia)

Brazil	Paraguay

GK	1	Júlio César
RB	2	Dani Alves	(yellow card) 90+1'
CB	3	Lúcio (c)
CB	4	Thiago Silva
LB	6	André Santos
CM	5	Lucas Leiva	(yellow card) 58'
CM	8	Ramires		(substituted off) 69'
RW	20	Jádson	(yellow card) 32'	(substituted off) 46'
AM	10	Ganso
LW	11	Neymar		(substituted off) 81'
CF	9	Alexandre Pato	(yellow card) 50'
Substitutions:
MF	16	Elano		(substituted on) 46'
FW	18	Lucas Moura		(substituted on) 69'
FW	19	Fred		(substituted on) 81'
Manager:
Mano Menezes

GK	1	Justo Villar (c)
RB	2	Darío Verón
CB	14	Paulo da Silva
CB	5	Antolín Alcaraz
LB	17	Aureliano Torres
RM	13	Enrique Vera
CM	20	Néstor Ortigoza
LM	16	Cristian Riveros		(substituted off) 67'
AM	9	Roque Santa Cruz
AM	21	Marcelo Estigarribia		(substituted off) 78'
CF	19	Lucas Barrios	(yellow card) 45'	(substituted off) 56'
Substitutions:
FW	18	Nelson Valdez		(substituted on) 56'
MF	15	Víctor Cáceres	(yellow card) 85'	(substituted on) 67'
MF	10	Osvaldo Martínez		(substituted on) 78'
Manager:
Gerardo Martino (Argentina)

Man of the Match:
Roque Santa Cruz (Paraguay)

Assistant referees:
Humberto Clavijo (Colombia)
Francisco Mondría (Chile)
Fourth official:
Enrique Osses (Chile)

== Venezuela vs Ecuador ==
9 July 2011
18:30

Venezuela	1–0	Ecuador
C. González 61'	Report

Estadio Padre Ernesto Martearena, Salta
Referee: Wálter Quesada (Costa Rica)

Venezuela	Ecuador

GK	1	Renny Vega
RB	16	Roberto Rosales
CB	20	Grenddy Perozo
CB	4	Oswaldo Vizcarrondo
LB	6	Gabriel Cichero
RM	11	César González	(substituted off) 64'
CM	14	Franklin Lucena
CM	8	Tomás Rincón
LM	18	Juan Arango (c)
CF	9	Giancarlo Maldonado	(substituted off) 80'
CF	7	Miku	(substituted off) 74'
Substitutions:
MF	19	Jesús Meza	(substituted on) 64'
FW	23	Salomón Rondón	(substituted on) 74'
MF	5	Giácomo Di Giorgi	(substituted on) 80'
Manager:
César Farías

GK	1	Marcelo Elizaga
RB	13	Néicer Reasco
CB	19	Norberto Araujo
CB	3	Frickson Erazo
LB	10	Walter Ayoví (c)
CM	6	Christian Noboa
CM	14	Segundo Castillo	(substituted off) 75'
AM	8	Édison Méndez
RW	11	Christian Benítez
LW	7	Michael Arroyo	(substituted off) 71'
CF	9	Felipe Caicedo
Substitutions:
FW	17	Edson Montaño	(substituted on) 71'
MF	15	David Quiroz	(substituted on) 75'
Manager:
Reinaldo Rueda (Colombia)

Man of the Match:
César González (Venezuela)

Assistant referees:
Leonel Leal (Costa Rica)
Miguel Nievas (Uruguay)
Fourth official:
Roberto Silvera (Uruguay)

== Paraguay vs Venezuela ==
13 July 2011
19:15

Paraguay	3–3	Venezuela
Alcaraz 32'; Barrios 62'; Riveros 85'	Report	Rondón 4'; Miku 89'; Perozo 90+2'

Estadio Padre Ernesto Martearena, Salta
Referee: Enrique Osses (Chile)

Paraguay	Venezuela

GK	1	Justo Villar (c)
RB	2	Darío Verón
CB	14	Paulo da Silva
CB	5	Antolín Alcaraz
LB	17	Aureliano Torres
CM	20	Néstor Ortigoza
CM	16	Cristian Riveros
RW	13	Enrique Vera		(substituted off) 70'
LW	21	Marcelo Estigarribia		(substituted off) 84'
CF	9	Roque Santa Cruz		(substituted off) 39'
CF	19	Lucas Barrios
Substitutions:
FW	18	Nelson Valdez	(yellow card) 74'	(substituted on) 39'
MF	11	Jonathan Santana	(yellow card) 80'	(substituted on) 70'
MF	15	Víctor Cáceres		(substituted on) 84'
Manager:
Gerardo Martino (Argentina)

GK	1	Renny Vega
RB	16	Roberto Rosales
CB	20	Grenddy Perozo	(yellow card) 74'
CB	4	Oswaldo Vizcarrondo
LB	6	Gabriel Cichero
RM	10	Yohandry Orozco		(substituted off) 66'
CM	5	Giácomo Di Giorgi
CM	8	Tomás Rincón (c)
LM	21	Alexander González		(substituted off) 75'
CF	17	Daniel Arismendi		(substituted off) 63'
CF	23	Salomón Rondón
Substitutions:
MF	18	Juan Arango		(substituted on) 63'
FW	7	Miku		(substituted on) 66'
FW	9	Giancarlo Maldonado	(yellow card) 78'	(substituted on) 75'
Manager:
César Farías

Man of the Match:
Lucas Barrios (Paraguay)

Assistant referees:
Francisco Mondría (Chile)
Marvin Torrentera (Mexico)
Fourth official:
Francisco Chacón (Mexico)

== Brazil vs Ecuador ==
13 July 2011
21:45

Brazil	4–2	Ecuador
Pato 28', 61'; Neymar 48', 71'	Report	Caicedo 36', 58'

Estadio Mario Alberto Kempes, Córdoba
Referee: Roberto Silvera (Uruguay)

Brazil	Ecuador

GK	1	Júlio César
RB	13	Maicon
CB	3	Lúcio (c)
CB	4	Thiago Silva
LB	6	André Santos	(yellow card) 70'
CM	5	Lucas Leiva
CM	8	Ramires
RW	7	Robinho
AM	10	Ganso		(substituted off) 76'
LW	11	Neymar		(substituted off) 79'
CF	9	Alexandre Pato		(substituted off) 84'
Substitutions:
MF	17	Elias		(substituted on) 76'
FW	18	Lucas Moura		(substituted on) 79'
FW	19	Fred		(substituted on) 84'
Manager:
Mano Menezes

GK	1	Marcelo Elizaga
RB	13	Néicer Reasco		(substituted off) 81'
CB	19	Norberto Araujo
CB	3	Frickson Erazo
LB	10	Walter Ayoví (c)
RM	7	Michael Arroyo
CM	6	Christian Noboa	(yellow card) 33'	(substituted off) 89'
CM	5	Oswaldo Minda	(yellow card) 79'
LM	8	Édison Méndez		(substituted off) 76'
CF	11	Christian Benítez
CF	9	Felipe Caicedo
Substitutions:
FW	23	Narciso Mina		(substituted on) 76'
DF	21	Gabriel Achilier		(substituted on) 81'
FW	17	Edson Montaño		(substituted on) 89'
Manager:
Reinaldo Rueda (Colombia)

Man of the Match:
Alexandre Pato (Brazil)

Assistant referees:
Miguel Nievas (Uruguay)
Hernán Maidana (Argentina)
Fourth official:
Sergio Pezzotta (Argentina)
