= Diego Pérez =

Diego Pérez may refer to:

- Diego Pérez (footballer) (born 1980), Uruguayan footballer
- Diego Pérez (tennis) (born 1962), Uruguayan retired professional tennis player
- Diego Pérez (author), Ecuador-born American motivational writer known as Yung Pueblo
