= Sergio Markarián =

Uruguayan football manager (born 1944)

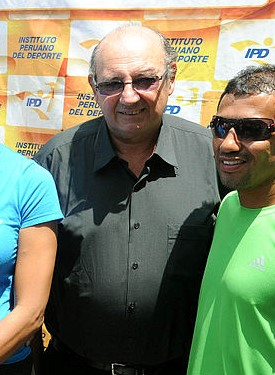
- Markarián in 2012

Personal information
- Full name: Sergio Apraham Markarián Abrahamián
- Date of birth: 1 November 1944 (age 81)
- Place of birth: Montevideo, Uruguay
- Height: 1.80 m (5 ft 11 in)

Managerial career
- Years: Team
- 1976–1979: Bella Vista
- 1980: Danubio
- 1981: River Plate Montevideo
- 1982: Danubio
- 1983–1984: Olimpia
- 1986: Olimpia
- 1987–1989: Sol de América
- 1990–1991: Cerro Porteño
- 1992–1993: Paraguay U23
- 1993–1994: Universitario
- 1995–1996: Universitario
- 1996–1997: Sporting Cristal
- 1998–1999: Ionikos
- 1999–2001: Paraguay
- 2001–2002: Panathinaikos
- 2002–2003: Panathinaikos
- 2004: Iraklis Thessaloniki
- 2005–2007: Libertad
- 2007–2008: Cruz Azul
- 2009: Universidad de Chile
- 2010: Danubio
- 2010–2013: Peru
- 2015: Greece
Medal record
Men's football
Representing Peru (as manager)
Copa América
Bronze medal – third place	2011

Sergio Apraham Markarián Abrahamián (born 1 November 1944) is a Uruguayan-Argentine former football coach of Armenian descent. In 2015, he was the head coach of the Greece national team.

== Early life ==
Markarián lived in Argentina during most of his childhood and adolescent years, from 7 to 18 years of age. He played football as a left center back defender until he was 17 years of age. Never making it to professional football, he entered into university studies and started working in a large fuel distribution company in Uruguay, eventually reaching the post of general manager. It was the Uruguay loss against Holland in the 1974 FIFA World Cup which spurred Markarian to realise that coaching football was his vocation. Markarian abandoned his well-paid post as general manager, taking many risks, even when facing criticism from colleagues and friends, in order to dedicate his life to coaching professional football. Markarian lost status and spending power and endured ten difficult years at the beginning of his coaching career. As he stated, "I had to sell my Mercedes Benz and start catching the bus!"

Markarián chose a career in professional coaching, and became well-respected in the field. He is known for his tactical skills, which led to the nickname, El Mago ("The Magician").

== Coaching career ==
Even though he set out with the idea for the improvement of Uruguayan football, he never coached professionally in Uruguay. Markarian started his career in 1974 coaching the Reserves of Club Atlético Bella Vista of Uruguay and went on to coach the first team. Markarian made his professional coaching debut as a coach for the football club, Olimpia Asunción of Paraguay in 1983. He won the Paraguayan league with Olimpia the very same year he started coaching in 1983 and then again in 1985. After his four-year stay at Olimpia, he made the move to the Paraguayan club, Sol de America, leading them to win the Torneo Republica and to become the Paraguayan league runner-up in 1989. He then made the move to another Paraguayan giant, Cerro Porteño, winning the Torneo Republica in 1990. Markarian coached the Paraguay U-23 National Team in 1992, winning the South American Pre-Olympic Championships and a spot to compete in the 1992 Barcelona Olympics. From 1993 to 1997, Markarian coached the Peruvian teams, Universitario de Deportes and Sporting Cristal winning one Peruvian league title with each of them. Markarian is also recognized for taking Sporting Cristal to the Copa Libertadores Final in which Sporting Cristal was the runner-up. In 1998, Markarian coached the Greek team, Ionikos, reaching fifth place in the Greek league and qualifying them for the UEFA Cup.

Markarian became the coach of the Paraguay National team from 1999 through 2001 qualifying Paraguay to the 2002 World Cup in Korea and Japan. He was fired by the Paraguayan Football Association in 2001 prior to the World Cup because he had lost his last two qualifier matches, a 3–1 away loss against Venezuela and a 4–0 home loss against Colombia. He was to be replaced by the Italian coach, Cesare Maldini.

After coaching the Paraguay National team, Markarian returned to Greece and became the head coach of Panathinaikos in 2001, reaching the quarter-finals in the UEFA Champions League. Markarian resigned his post as head coach in May 2002 only to return in October saying that he "needed time off to collect his thought and relax". The following season, Markarian led them to the quarter-finals of the UEFA Cup but lost to José Mourinho's FC Porto. In June 2004, he was hired by Iraklis, replacing Mats Jingblad. Having fallen out with star signing Giuseppe Signori, he was fired on 20 December that year due to indifferent results. Iraklis were sitting at 11th place in the Alpha Ethniki with 15 points in 12 games at the time of his dismissal. He was succeeded by Savvas Kofidis.

After coaching in Greece since 2002, Markarian returned to Paraguay to coach Libertad from 2005 to 2007, winning Paraguayan League titles in 2006 and 2007. Markarian was appointed coach of Mexico's Cruz Azul in June 2007 and took them to the Apertura final but lost to Santos Laguna. He walked away a year later because of differences he had with the club's board regarding how to reinforce the squad.

He had the option to be the head coach of Costa Rica national team, but the Costa Rican Football Federation picked Rodrigo Kenton as their head coach. Markarian coached Universidad de Chile in 2009, winning the Chilean Torneo Apertura- the first title the Universidad de Chile had won in the last 5 years- before then terminating his contract due to differences with the club's management only six months into the year.

In July 2010, Markarian was appointed as the new head coach of the Peru national team for the 2011 Copa America and the 2014 FIFA World Cup Qualifiers. Markarian succeeded José del Solar who led the Peruvian team in a disastrous campaign, finishing last during the 2010 World Cup qualifiers. Under great expectations from the media, Markarian stated in a press conference, "I expect from my heart that this will be my best work in my career as a coach". Markarian's objective was to qualify Peru to the 2014 World Cup and recover the luster that Peruvian football once had. This would prove to be a great challenge, as Peru had missed out on all editions of the World Cup since its last appearance in 1982. Nonetheless, Markarian set out to overcome this challenge with the help of his assistants Pablo Bengoechea and Óscar Aguirregaray and Physical Coach Gonzalo Barreiro. In 2010, Markarian was the third best paid coach in South America earning a year. Only Mano Menezes and Marcelo Bielsa had higher salaries than Markarian at the time. After a 1–0 loss in a friendly game with Panama in October, Markarian excluded players Reimond Manco, Jefferson Farfán, and John Galliquio from the squad because they reportedly went to a Panama City club despite orders not to go out.

He managed Peru in a successful 2011 Copa América campaign with the team finished third after beating Venezuela 4–1, leaving fans to be enthusiastic about a possible football revival for Peru. However, the 2014 World Cup qualification became another disappointing campaign, with a 2–1 of Peru over his home ancestral team Uruguay in Lima meant that the Peruvians would miss another World Cup. In October 2013, Markarián resigned as head coach of the Peru national team. Peru would eventually qualify for World Cup four years later.

On 12 February 2015 Markarian was appointed as the new head coach of the Greece national team. In July 2015, after a 2–1 loss against the Faroe Islands in qualifying for the 2016 European Championship, Markarian resigned.

== Honours ==
Olimpia

- Paraguayan Primera División: 1983, 1985

Universitario de Deportes

- Peruvian Primera División: 1993

Sporting Cristal

- Peruvian Primera División: 1996
- Copa Libertadores: runner-up 1997

Libertad

- Paraguayan Primera División: 2006, 2007

Universidad de Chile

- Torneo Apertura: 2009

Paraguay U23

- CONMEBOL Men Pre-Olympic Tournament: 1992

Peru

- Copa América: third place 2011
