= Giácomo Di Giorgi =

Venezuelan footballer (born 1981)

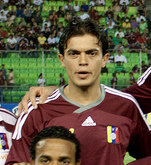

Personal information
- Full name: Giácomo Di Giorgi Zerillo
- Date of birth: 24 February 1981 (age 45)
- Place of birth: Acarigua, Venezuela
- Height: 1.79 m (5 ft 10 in)
- Position: Central midfielder

Youth career
- 1998–2001: Unión Lara

Senior career*
Years	Team	Apps	(Gls)
2001–2004	Estudiantes de Mérida	42	(2)
2004–2007	Carabobo	45	(1)
2007–2008	Llaneros	19	(0)
2008–2013	Anzoátegui	120	(2)
2013–2014	Deportivo Tachira	30	(2)
2014–2017	Caracas	96	(2)
2017–2019	ACD Lara	70	(0)

International career
2001	Venezuela U20	5	(0)
2002–2012	Venezuela	35	(0)
- * Club domestic league appearances and goals as of 11 September 2017

Giácomo Di Giorgi Zerillo (Spanish pronunciation: [ˈxjakomo ði ˈxjoɾxi]; born 24 February 1981) is a Venezuelan footballer as a central midfielder. Di Giorgi can also operates as a playmaker, including as a defensive midfielder. He is of Italian descent, with Italians grandparents from both sides. He holds an Italian passport.

== Honours ==
=== International ===
- Copa América (1): Fourth place 2011
