= Francisco Chacón =

Mexican football referee

- Full name: Francisco Chacón Gutiérrez
- Born: May 8, 1976 (age 50); Irapuato, Guanajuato, Mexico

Domestic
Years	League	Role
2003–2019	Liga MX	Referee
2003–2008	Ascenso MX	Referee

International
Years	League	Role
2009–2017	FIFA listed	Referee

Francisco Chacón Gutiérrez (born May 8, 1976, Irapuato, Guanajuato) is a Mexican former football referee qualified by FIFA to officiate international matches.

An international referee from 2009 to 2017, Chacón has been selected for two FIFA Tournaments, the 2011 CONCACAF Gold Cup and the 2011 Copa América.

== Officiating in domestic leagues ==
Chacón's first game as a referee was on September 7, 2003, in the Mexican Primera "A" during Round 6 of Torneo Apertura 2003 between Tapatio and Tijuana. On August 21, 2004, he made his debut in the Mexican Primera Division in a match between Club Atlas and Puebla FC in Round 2 of Torneo Apertura 2004. He issued seven cards, including two red cards, during the match. He refereeing in 2 Superclasicos and 1 as the 4th official in Mexican football short tournaments history. On August 20, 2011, Chacón was the official for the match between Santos Laguna and Monarcas Morelia when the match was suspended in the 40th minute due to gunfire.

== FIFA accreditation ==
Chacón was accredited to official international matches by FIFA on January 1, 2009.

== International matches officiated ==
Tournament	Date	Venue	Round	Team 1	Result	Team 2
2011 CONCACAF Gold Cup	June 6, 2011	The Home Depot Center, Carson, California, United States	First round	Honduras	0 – 0	Guatemala
2011 Copa América	July 10, 2011	Estadio Brigadier General Estanislao López, Santa Fe, Argentina	First round	Colombia	2 – 0	Bolivia
2011 Copa América	July 16, 2011	Estadio Mario Alberto Kempes, Córdoba, Argentina	Quarter Finals	Colombia	0 – 2	Peru
2011 Copa América	July 20, 2011	Estadio Malvinas Argentinas, Mendoza, Argentina	Semi Finals	Paraguay	0 – 0	Venezuela
