= Elvis Marecos =

Paraguayan footballer (born 1980)

Personal information
- Full name: Elvis Israel Marecos
- Date of birth: 15 February 1980 (age 46)
- Place of birth: Itá, Paraguay
- Height: 1.83 m (6 ft 0 in)
- Position: Defender

Senior career*
Years	Team	Apps	(Gls)
1999	Sportivo Iteño	5	(0)
2000–2001	12 de Octubre	156	(18)
2001–2002	Olimpia Asunción	5	(0)
2003–2006	12 de Octubre	23	(1)
2006	Bolívar	18	(6)
2007	12 de Octubre	20	(3)
2008	Cobreloa	18	(1)
2009–2013	Club Guaraní	153	(16)
2014	12 de Octubre	2	(0)
2016	Sportivo Trinidense		
2017–2018	Resistencia		

International career
1999	Paraguay U-20		
2009–2011	Paraguay	8	(1)
Medal record
Representing Paraguay
Copa América
Runner-up	2011 Argentina	Team
- * Club domestic league appearances and goals

Elvis Israel Marecos (born 15 February 1980 in Itá) is a Paraguay international retired footballer who played on the left of defence.

Marceos formerly played for Olimpia and Guaraní in Paraguay, Club Bolivar in Bolivia and Cobreloa in Chile. He was also a member of the national squad at the 1999 FIFA World Youth Championship in Nigeria.
