= Antolín Alcaraz =

Paraguayan footballer (born 1982)

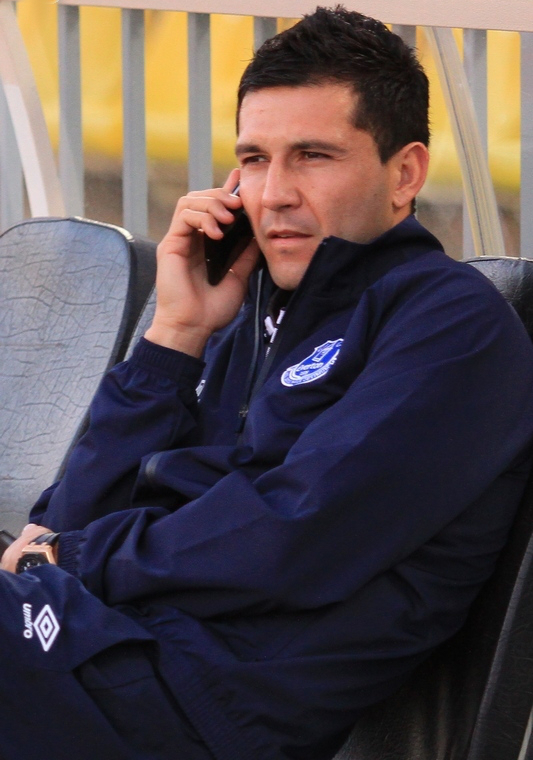
- Alcaraz with Everton in 2014

Personal information
- Full name: Antolín Alcaraz Viveros
- Date of birth: 30 July 1982 (age 44)
- Place of birth: San Roque González, Paraguay
- Height: 1.87 m (6 ft 2 in)
- Position: Centre-back

Senior career*
Years	Team	Apps	(Gls)
1998–2001	Teniente Fariña	?	(?)
2001–2002	Racing Club	0	(0)
2002	→ Fiorentina (loan)	0	(0)
2003–2007	Beira-Mar	112	(5)
2007–2010	Club Brugge	68	(5)
2010–2013	Wigan Athletic	69	(3)
2013–2015	Everton	14	(0)
2015–2016	Las Palmas	6	(1)
2016–2018	Libertad	74	(2)
2019–2023	Olimpia	80	(6)
Total		423	(22)

International career
2008–2012	Paraguay	23	(2)
Medal record
Representing Paraguay
Copa América
Runner-up	2011 Argentina	Team
- * Club domestic league appearances and goals

Antolín Alcaraz Viveros (born 30 July 1982) is a Paraguayan former professional footballer who played as a centre-back.

He rarely settled with a team in his early career, before signing in 2003 with Beira-Mar and remaining with the club five seasons, after which he joined Club Brugge. He then spent five years in the Premier League, in service of Wigan Athletic and Everton; after one year in Spain with Las Palmas, he returned to his country.

Alcaraz represented Paraguay at the 2010 World Cup and the 2011 Copa América, helping them to the final of the later tournament.

== Club career ==
=== Early years and Beira-Mar ===
Hailing from a humble background, Alcaraz worked throughout his teenage years as a builder's assistant in his hometown of San Roque González de Santa Cruz in the Paraguarí Department. He started his career at Club Teniente Fariña in the city of Ñemby, but he did not have the intention of one day playing professional football.

Whilst Alcaraz was working as a builder at the age of 18, he met scout and football agent Carlos Bruni who took him to Argentina's Racing Club de Avellaneda. He appeared rarely during his spell.

Alcaraz was loaned to ACF Fiorentina in 2002, but the Italians soon faced bankruptcy and regrouped in the Lega Pro Seconda Divisione. He then had a trial at U.S. Città di Palermo, but nothing came of it.

In January 2003, Alcaraz signed for Portuguese club S.C. Beira-Mar. After seven appearances in half a season, he became a defensive mainstay at the Aveiro side. In 2005–06 he helped them return to the Primeira Liga, playing 31 matches.

=== Brugge ===
Alcaraz joined Club Brugge KV in Belgium on 30 April 2007, with the deal being effective as of July.

After a slow first season he also eventually became first choice, helping his team to two third-places and one second.

=== Wigan Athletic ===
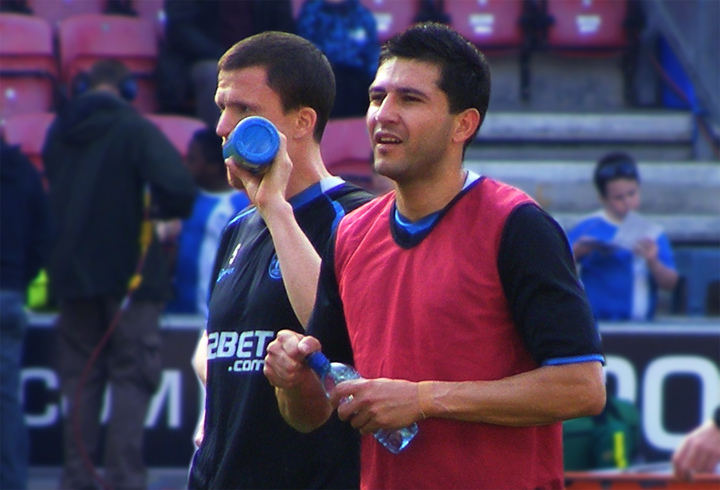
Álcaraz training with Wigan in 2011

On 14 May 2010, Alcaraz signed with Wigan Athletic on a free transfer for an undisclosed fee, as his contract with Brugge was due to expire at the end of June; his new manager, Roberto Martínez, stated that the player was in "the best form of his career" at that point. He scored his first goal for the club against Sunderland on 11 September 2010, netting in the 86th minute for a 1–1 home draw.

Alcaraz caused widespread controversy on 6 November 2011, when replays showed him spitting at Wolverhampton Wanderers defender Richard Stearman during a 3–1 defeat at Molineux Stadium. He was handed a three-game suspension due to his actions, but later issued an apology.

On 7 May 2012, Alcaraz scored the game's only goal at Blackburn Rovers to retain the Latics' top-division safety, whilst relegating their opponent to the Football League Championship. He won the 2013 FA Cup, featuring the full 90 minutes in the 1–0 upset of Manchester City. However, only three days later, with him on the pitch again, Wigan were relegated from the top division following a 1–4 away loss to Arsenal.

=== Everton ===
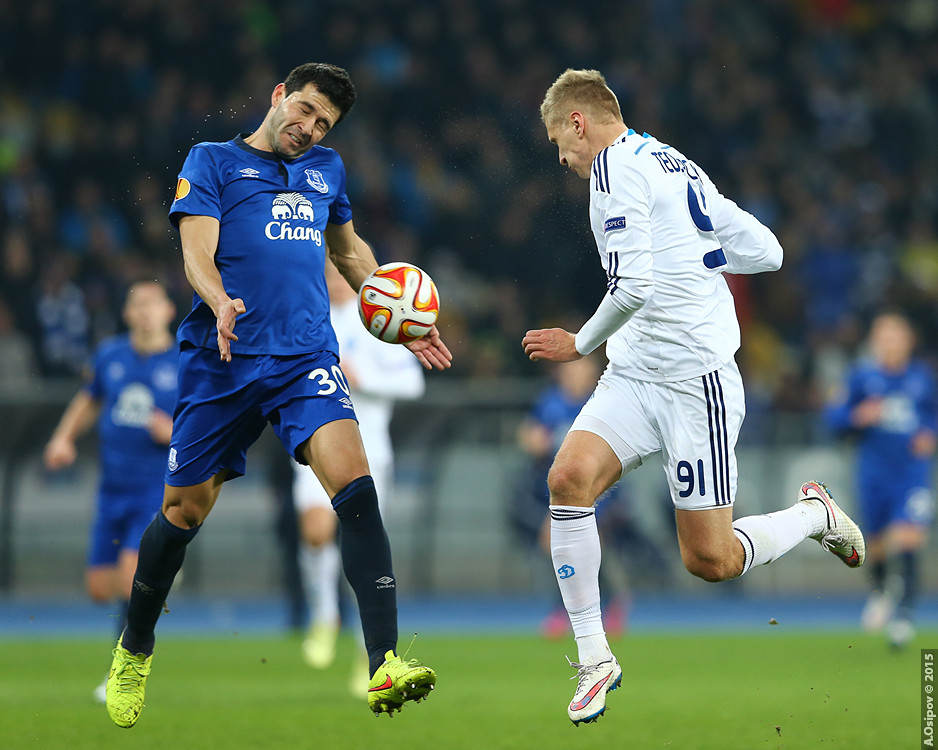
Álcaraz in action during the 2014–15 UEFA Europa League

On 9 July 2013, after becoming a free agent, Alcaraz moved to Everton on a two-year deal as both he and goalkeeper Joel Robles followed coach Martínez to the club. He made his competitive debut on 29 December after an injury struck his start to the season, featuring the full 90 minutes in a 2–1 home win over Southampton.

On 26 April 2014, Alcaraz scored an own goal in the first minute of a 0–2 loss to Southampton. On 1 January of the following year, he received his first sending off as an Everton player, being shown two yellow cards in a 0–2 away defeat against Hull City which was the team's fourth successive of the festive period.

On 10 June 2015, Alcaraz was released.

=== Las Palmas ===
On 2 August 2015, aged nearly 33, Alcaraz signed a one-year contract with newly promoted La Liga side UD Las Palmas with the option of a second one. He scored his first goal on 23 September, helping best Sevilla FC 2–0 at home.

During his spell at the Estadio Gran Canaria, Alcaraz made only seven competitive appearances due to injury. On 29 January 2016, he left by mutual consent.

=== Return home ===
In February 2016, Alcaraz agreed to a deal at Club Libertad. He made his Paraguayan Primera División debut the following month at the age of 33, in a 2–1 home victory against Cerro Porteño.

On 2 January 2019, Alcaraz signed with Club Olimpia of the same league. In his debut campaign, he was part of the squad that won the national championship.

== International career ==
In November 2008, Alcaraz received his first call-up to the Paraguay national team at the age of 26. He was picked for the squad present at the 2010 FIFA World Cup; on 14 June, in the group stage opener against Italy, in just his seventh cap, he headed home through a powerful header following a set piece in an eventual 1–1 draw in Cape Town, and went on to play all the matches (save one due to suspension) and minutes for the quarter-finalists.

Alcaraz was again first choice for Paraguay during the 2011 Copa América, held in Argentina. On 13 July, he scored the 1–1 equaliser against Venezuela in an eventual 3–3 group stage draw. Four days later, in the quarter-finals with Brazil, he was sent off after an altercation with Lucas Leiva, and the national side finished runners-up.

== Career statistics ==
=== Club ===
As of match played 19 March 2015

Appearances and goals by club, season and competition
Club	Season	League			Cup		Europe		Other		Total	
Club	Season	Division	Apps	Goals	Apps	Goals	Apps	Goals	Apps	Goals	Apps	Goals
Beira-Mar	2002–03	Primeira Liga	0	0	0	0	0	0	0	0	0	0
Beira-Mar	2003–04	Primeira Liga	2	0	0	0	0	0	0	0	2	0
Beira-Mar	2004–05	Primeira Liga	24	1	0	0	0	0	0	0	24	1
Beira-Mar	2005–06	Segunda Liga	29	0	0	0	0	0	0	0	29	0
Beira-Mar	2006–07	Primeira Liga	26	3	0	0	0	0	0	0	26	3
Beira-Mar	Total		81	4	0	0	0	0	0	0	81	4
Club Brugge	2007–08	Belgian Pro League	10	1	0	0	0	0	0	0	10	0
Club Brugge	2008–09	Belgian Pro League	29	3	3	0	6	1	0	0	38	3
Club Brugge	2009–10	Belgian Pro League	29	1	0	0	11	0	0	0	40	1
Club Brugge	Total		68	5	3	0	17	1	0	0	88	4
Wigan Athletic	2010–11	Premier League	34	1	4	0	0	0	0	0	38	1
Wigan Athletic	2011–12	Premier League	25	2	0	0	0	0	0	0	25	2
Wigan Athletic	2012–13	Premier League	10	0	4	0	0	0	0	0	14	0
Wigan Athletic	Total		69	3	8	0	0	0	0	0	77	3
Everton	2013–14	Premier League	6	0	1	0	0	0	0	0	7	0
Everton	2014–15	Premier League	8	0	1	0	5	0	0	0	14	0
Everton	Total		14	0	2	0	5	0	0	0	21	0
Career total			231	12	13	0	22	1	0	0	256	13

=== International ===
Appearances and goals by national team and year
National team	Year	Apps	Goals
Paraguay	2008	1	0
Paraguay	2009	3	0
Paraguay	2010	9	1
Paraguay	2011	6	1
Paraguay	2012	4	0
Total		23	2

Scores and results list Paraguay's goal tally first, score column indicates score after each Alcaraz goal

List of international goals scored by Antolín Alcaraz
No.	Date	Venue	Opponent	Score	Result	Competition
1	14 June 2010	Cape Town Stadium, Cape Town, South Africa	Italy	1–0	1–1	2010 FIFA World Cup
2	13 July 2011	Estadio Padre Ernesto Martearena, Salta, Argentina	Venezuela	1–1	3–3	2011 Copa América

== Honours ==
=== Club ===
Beira-Mar

- Segunda Liga: 2005–06

Wigan Athletic

- FA Cup: 2012–13

Libertad

- Paraguayan Primera División: 2016 Apertura, 2017 Apertura

Olimpia

- Paraguayan Primera División: 2019

=== International ===
Paraguay

- Copa América runner-up: 2011
