= Marcelo Estigarribia =

Paraguayan footballer (born 1987)

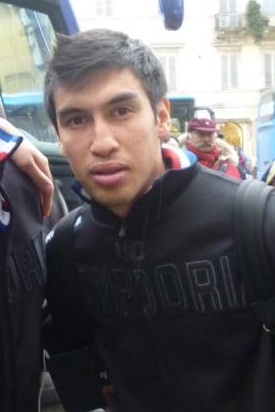
- Estigarribia in 2013

Personal information
- Full name: Marcelo Alejandro Estigarribia Balmori
- Date of birth: 21 September 1987 (age 39)
- Place of birth: Fernando de la Mora, Paraguay
- Height: 1.81 m (5 ft 11 in)
- Position: Left winger

Team information
- Current team: Sportivo Ameliano

Youth career
- Unión Pacífico

Senior career*
Years	Team	Apps	(Gls)
2005–2006	Sport Colombia	10	(0)
2006–2008	Cerro Porteño	45	(6)
2008–2011	Le Mans	12	(0)
2010–2011	→ Newell's Old Boys (loan)	45	(0)
2011–2021	Deportivo Maldonado	15	(2)
2011–2012	→ Juventus (loan)	14	(1)
2012–2013	→ Sampdoria (loan)	34	(2)
2013–2014	→ Chievo Verona (loan)	16	(0)
2014–2015	→ Atalanta (loan)	25	(2)
2016–2017	→ Cerro Porteño (loan)	22	(1)
2017	→ Chiapas (loan)	6	(1)
2017–2020	→ Colón (loan)	66	(4)
2021	→ Olimpia (loan)	15	(0)
2022	Sol de América	35	(3)
2023–	Sportivo Ameliano	10	(0)

International career^{‡}
2007	Paraguay U20		
2008–	Paraguay	32	(1)
Medal record
Representing Paraguay
Copa América
Runner-up	2011 Argentina	Team
- * Club domestic league appearances and goals as of 16 January 2023 ‡ National team caps and goals as of 1 July 2013

Marcelo Alejandro Estigarribia Balmori (born 21 September 1987) is a Paraguayan professional footballer who plays as a left winger for Sportivo Ameliano in the Primera División Paraguaya.

Estigarribia has been known since youth as Chelo, as a diminutive of his name Marcelo. He also has an Italian passport by way of his mother. At club level, Estigarribia has played for teams in Paraguay, France, Uruguay, Argentina, Italy, and Mexico. At international level, he has represented the Paraguay national team, and was member of the squad that finished second at the 2011 Copa América.

== Biography ==
Estigarribia was born and raised in Fernando de la Mora, one kilometer away from the Paraguayan capital Asunción. He comes from a strongly Catholic family.

== Club career ==
=== Club Unión Pacífico ===
Estigarribia started his career in the youth divisions of Club Unión Pacífico before moving to Sport Colombia where he made his professional debut at the age of 17.

=== Le Mans ===
In 2006, Estigarribia moved to Paraguayan side Cerro Porteño, and in August 2008 he was transferred to Le Mans of the Ligue 1.

=== Newell's Old Boys ===
On 27 December 2009, Estigarribia signed for Newell's Old Boys on loan from Le Mans for 18 months. In June 2011, it was reported by the Daily Record that Scottish Premier League club Rangers were chasing Estigarribia when their boss Ally McCoist spent a week scouting in Argentina.

=== Juventus ===
On 28 August 2011, Estigarribia moved to Juventus FC on a season loan for a €500,000 fee, with an option of making the transfer permanent for €5 million at the end of the season, from a proxy club Deportivo Maldonado. He made his debut as a substitute against Chievo and got his first start against Genoa. He scored his first goal for Juventus against Napoli where the match ended in a 3–3 tie.

=== Sampdoria ===
On 4 August 2012, Estigarribia moved to U.C. Sampdoria on a season-long loan for a €700,000 fee, with the option of making his stay with Sampdoria permanent for €5 million at the end of the season. He made his debut with Blucerchiati against A.C. Milan, winning 0–1.

=== Chiapas ===
On 25 January 2017, Estigarribia joined Liga MX side Chiapas on loan from Deportivo Maldonado.

=== Colón ===
On 22 August 2017, Estigarribia joined Argentine club Club Atlético Colón.

=== Olimpia Asunción ===
In January 2021, it was announced that Estigarribia signed a one-year agreement with Olimpia Asunción. The club announced the signing through its official website. His arrival at the club was through a request of the coach, the Argentine Nestor Gorosito, who stated that Estigarribia can be used in three positions.

== International career ==
Estigarribia received his first senior international cap for Paraguay in a friendly match against Ivory Coast on 22 May 2008. He scored his first international goal in a friendly match against South Africa on 31 March 2010. His performances in the 2011 Copa América, where Paraguay went on to reach the final of the tournament, only to lose out 3–0 to Uruguay, prompted Italian giants Juventus to make a move for him.

== Career statistics ==
=== Club ===
As of 24 April 2019

Appearances and goals by club, season and competition
Club	Season	League			Cup		Continental		Other		Total	
Club	Season	Division	Apps	Goals	Apps	Goals	Apps	Goals	Apps	Goals	Apps	Goals
Le Mans	2008–09	Ligue 1	7	0	1	0	–		–		8	0
Le Mans	2009–10	Ligue 1	5	0	0	0	–		–		5	0
Le Mans	Total		12	0	1	0	0	0	0	0	13	0
Newell's Old Boys (loan)	2009–10	Argentine Primera División	15	0	0	0	1	0	–		16	0
Newell's Old Boys (loan)	2010–11	Argentine Primera División	30	0	0	0	6	1	–		36	1
Newell's Old Boys (loan)	Total		45	0	0	0	7	1	0	0	52	1
Juventus (loan)	2011–12	Serie A	14	1	4	0	–		–		18	1
Sampdoria (loan)	2012–13	Serie A	34	2	1	0	–		–		35	2
Chievo (loan)	2013–14	Serie A	16	0	1	0	–		–		17	0
Atalanta (loan)	2013–14	Serie A	12	1	0	0	0	0	–		12	1
Atalanta (loan)	2014–15	Serie A	9	1	1	0	0	0	–		10	1
Atalanta (loan)	2015–16	Serie A	4	0	1	0	0	0	–		5	0
Atalanta (loan)	Total		25	2	2	0	0	0	0	0	27	2
Cerro Porteño (loan)	2016	Paraguayan Primera División	22	1	0	0	15	0	–		37	1
Chiapas (loan)	2016–17	Liga MX	6	1	3	0	0	0	–		9	1
Colón (loan)	2017–18	Argentine Primera División	23	3	1	0	1	0	–		25	3
Colón (loan)	2018–19	Argentine Primera División	22	1	4	0	5	1	–		31	2
Colón (loan)	Total		45	4	5	0	6	1	0	0	56	5
Career total			219	11	17	0	28	2	0	0	264	13

=== International ===
Goal	Date	Venue	Opponent	Score	Result	Competition
1.	31 March 2010	Defensores del Chaco, Asunción, Paraguay	South Africa	1–0	1–1	Friendly

== Honours ==
Juventus

- Serie A: 2011–12
