= Carlos Vera =

Ecuadorian football referee

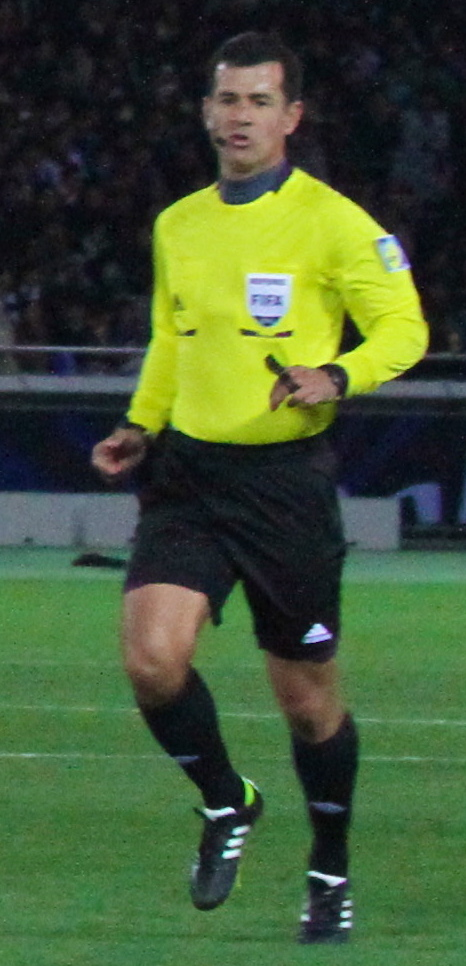
- Vera at the 2012 FIFA Club World Cup
- Full name: Carlos Alfredo Vera Rodríguez
- Born: 25 June 1976 (age 50); Junín, Ecuador

International
Years	League	Role
2006–	CONMEBOL	Referee

Carlos Alfredo Vera Rodríguez (born 25 June 1976) is a football referee from Ecuador.

== Career ==
Vera has been an international referee since 2006. He has officiated matches in FIFA World Cup qualifiers, the Copa Libertadores, the Copa Sudamericana and the South American Youth Football Championship. He was selected as a referee for the 2011 Copa América in Argentina, and the 2015 Copa America in Chile. In addition, he was appointed by FIFA to take charge of matches at the 2012 FIFA Club World Cup and the 2014 FIFA World Cup. He was selected as the fourth official for the 2014 FIFA World Cup Final.
