= Wílmar Roldán =

Colombian football referee (born 1980)

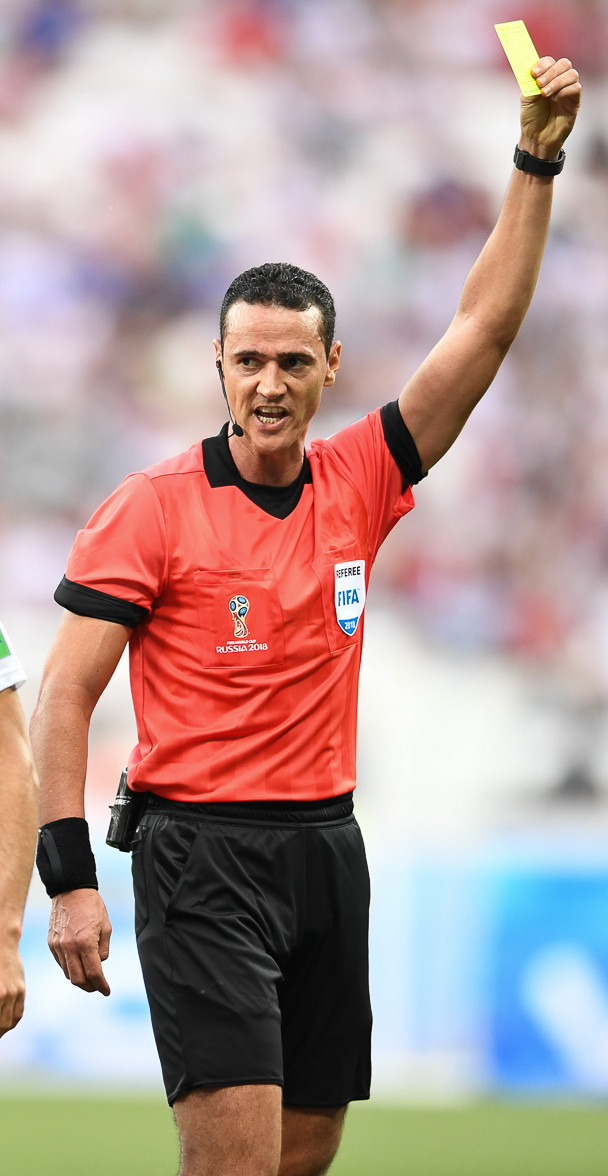
- Roldán refereeing at the 2018 FIFA World Cup
- Full name: Wílmar Alexánder Roldán Pérez
- Born: 24 January 1980 (age 46); Remedios, Colombia

Domestic
Years	League	Role
2003-	Categoría Primera A	Referee

International
Years	League	Role
2008–	FIFA	Referee

Wílmar Alexánder Roldán Pérez (Spanish pronunciation: [ˈwilmaɾ rolˈdam ˈpeɾes]; born 24 January 1980 in Remedios, Antioquia) is a Colombian football referee. He was ranked the World's 7th Best Referee of 2015 by the IFFHS.

He has been a referee in the domestic league since 2003 and became a FIFA International in 2008.

He was selected for his maiden Copa América tournament in 2011, where he officiated in two group matches and the third-place match between Venezuela and Peru. He also officiated at the 2012 Olympic tournament and 2014 FIFA World Cup qualifiers.

In March 2013, FIFA named Roldán to its list of 52 candidate referees for the 2014 FIFA World Cup in Brazil. In January 2014, FIFA included him in its refereeing team for the World Cup. He was the head referee in the Group A match between Mexico and Cameroon.

In April 2017, he was selected as a referee for the 2017 FIFA Confederations Cup in Russia. He was selected to officiate the tournament's opening game between the host nation Russia and New Zealand.

In June 2018, he was selected to referee England v Tunisia in the 2018 FIFA World Cup in Russia.

He officiated at the Ecuador v Venezuela match during the Copa América in 2024.

On the 30th of June, 2024, after Canada 0-0 draw Chile, with Canada advancing to the quarterfinals, the Chilean Football Federation filed a formal complaint to CONMEBOL against Roldán and calling the confederation to have him suspended, claiming him to have questionable and poor refereeing decisions which ultimately knocked out Chile out of the group stage. The controversies based on these refereeing mistakes have led to an outrage by the Chilean fans, with most of them sending recipes to his personal accounts as a form of protest. The complaint still hasn't been approved as of July 2024.
