= 2011 Copa América =

Copa América Argentina 2011

Tournament details
- Host country: Argentina
- Dates: 1–24 July
- Teams: 12 (from 2 confederations)
- Venues: 8 (in 8 host cities)

Final positions
- Champions: Uruguay (15th title)
- Runners-up: Paraguay
- Third place: Peru
- Fourth place: Venezuela

Tournament statistics
- Matches played: 26
- Goals scored: 54 (2.08 per match)
- Attendance: 882,621 (33,947 per match)
- Top scorer(s): (Peru) Paolo Guerrero (5 goals)
- Best player: (Uruguay) Luis Suárez
- Best young player: (Uruguay) Sebastián Coates
- Best goalkeeper: (Paraguay) Justo Villar
- Fair play award: Uruguay

The 2011 Campeonato Sudamericano Copa América, better known as the 2011 Copa América or the Copa América 2011 Argentina, was the 43rd edition of the Copa América, the main international football tournament for national teams in South America. The competition was organized by CONMEBOL, South America's football governing body, and was held in Argentina from 1 to 24 July. The draw for the tournament was held in La Plata on 11 November 2010.

Uruguay won the tournament after defeating Paraguay 3–0 in the final, giving them a record 15th Copa América title and their first since 1995. Paraguay, as the tournament runner-up, earned the Copa Bolivia; Paraguay's performance was noteworthy, as they were able to reach the finals without winning a single game in the tournament; their success in the final stages was achieved by the way of penalty shoot-outs. Brazil were the defending champions but were eliminated by Paraguay in the quarter-finals after failing to convert any of the penalties. As the tournament champion, Uruguay earned the right to represent CONMEBOL in the 2013 FIFA Confederations Cup, held in Brazil. Despite losing to Peru 4–1 in the third-place match, Venezuela had their best ever performance in the tournament.

== Competing nations ==
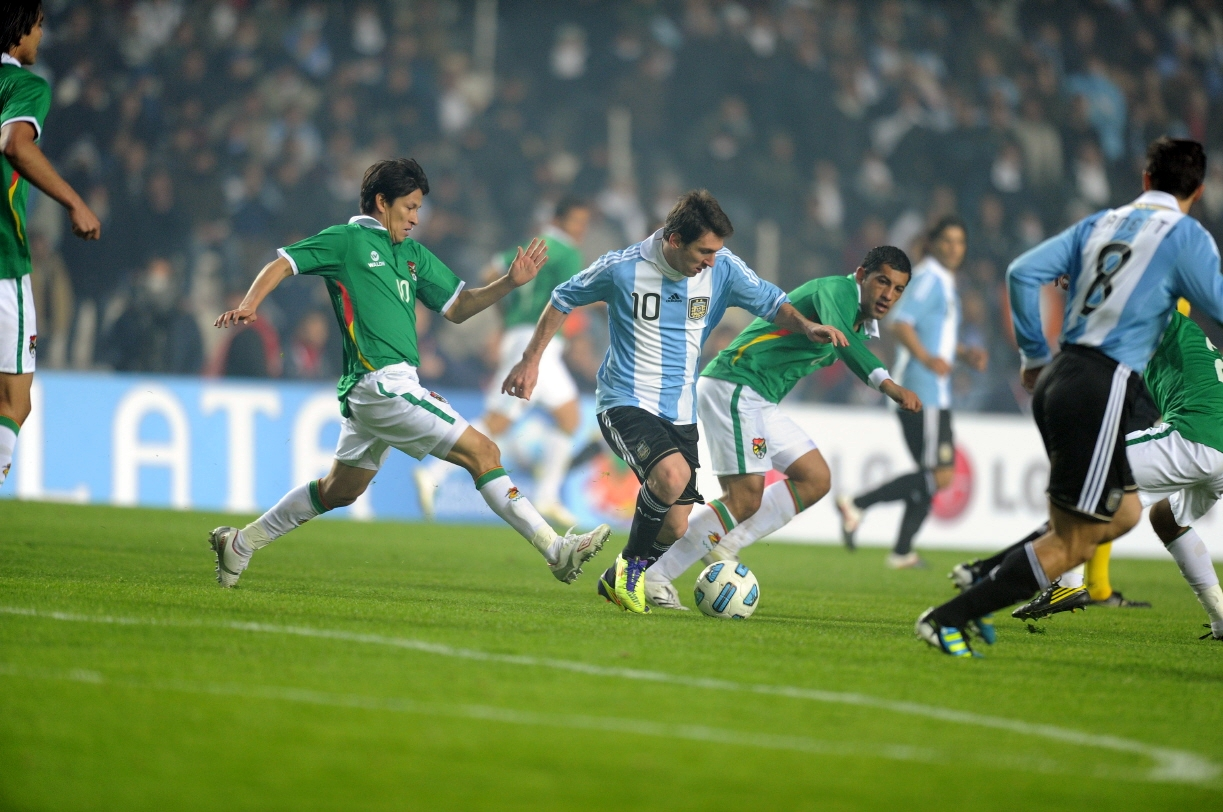
Opening game: Argentina v. Bolivia.

Both Japan and Mexico were invited to join the CONMEBOL nations in the tournament. Following a proposal by UEFA regarding national teams competing in tournaments organised by confederations different from their own, it was reported on 23 November 2009 that the two countries might not be able to take part in the 2011 Copa América. However, on 31 March 2010, CONCACAF confirmed that Mexico would be allowed to send their 2012 U-23 Olympic Team, supplemented with five over-age players. In addition to Mexico sending a weaker team than those teams sent in previous participations, eight of the Mexican players originally called to play the Copa America 2011 were suspended because of indiscipline one week before the competition started.

Japan's participation was in doubt after the 2011 Tōhoku earthquake and tsunami, but the Japan Football Association confirmed on 16 March 2011 that they would participate. However, the Japanese FA later withdrew from the tournament on 4 April 2011 citing scheduling conflict with rescheduled J. League matches. Following a meeting with the leadership of the Argentine Football Association, the Japanese FA decided to hold off on their final decision until 15 April. The Japanese FA later announced on 14 April that they would compete in the competition using mainly European based players. The Japanese FA withdrew their team again on 16 May citing difficulties with European clubs in releasing Japanese players. On the next day, CONMEBOL sent a formal invitation letter to the Costa Rican Football Federation inviting Costa Rica as replacement. Costa Rica accepted the invitation later that day.

The following twelve teams, shown with pre-tournament FIFA World Rankings, played in the tournament:

- Argentina (10) (hosts)
- Bolivia (93)
- Brazil (5) (holders)
- Chile (27)
- Colombia (54)
- Costa Rica (55) (invitee)
- Ecuador (68)
- Mexico (9) (invitee)
- Paraguay (32)
- Peru (49)
- Uruguay (18)
- Venezuela (69)

== Venues ==
A total of eight cities hosted the tournament. The opening game was played at Estadio Ciudad de La Plata, and the final was played at Estadio Monumental Antonio Vespucio Liberti.

Buenos Aires	Córdoba	La Plata	Santa Fe
Estadio Monumental	Estadio Mario Alberto Kempes	Estadio Ciudad de La Plata	Estadio Brigadier General Estanislao López
Capacity: 65,921	Capacity: 57,000	Capacity: 53,000	Capacity: 47,000
Location of the host cities of the 2011 Copa América.		Mendoza	San Juan
Location of the host cities of the 2011 Copa América.		Estadio Malvinas Argentinas	Estadio del Bicentenario
Location of the host cities of the 2011 Copa América.		Capacity: 40,268	Capacity: 25,000
Location of the host cities of the 2011 Copa América.		Jujuy	Salta
Location of the host cities of the 2011 Copa América.		Estadio 23 de Agosto	Estadio Padre Ernesto Martearena
Location of the host cities of the 2011 Copa América.		Capacity: 23,000	Capacity: 20,408

== Draw ==
The draw for the competition took place on 11 November 2010 at 17:00 (UTC−03:00) in the Teatro Argentino de La Plata in La Plata, and was broadcast in Argentina by Canal Siete. On 18 October 2010, CONMEBOL's The executive committee decided to place the teams in pots for the draw.

Pot 1	Pot 2	Pot 3	Pot 4
Argentina; Brazil; Uruguay	Chile; Colombia; Paraguay	Bolivia; Peru; Venezuela	Ecuador; Costa Rica; Mexico

== Squads ==
Each association presented a list of twenty-three players to compete in the tournament five days before their first match. On 14 June 2011, CONMEBOL allowed for the inscription of twenty-three players for the tournament, up one player from the previous allowed twenty-two. Of those twenty-three players, three must be goalkeepers.

== Match officials ==
The list of twenty-four referees and two extra referees selected for the tournament were announced on 6 June 2011 by CONMEBOL's Referee Commission. Two referees were chosen from each participating association:

(Argentina) Sergio Pezzotta

Assistant: Ricardo Casas

(Bolivia) Raúl Orosco

Assistant: Efraín Castro

(Brazil) Sálvio Fagundes

Assistant: Marcio Santiago

(Chile) Enrique Osses

Assistant: Francisco Mondría

(Colombia) Wilmar Roldán

Assistant: Humberto Clavijo

(Ecuador) Carlos Vera

Assistant: Luis Alvarado

(Paraguay) Carlos Amarilla (Note: Amarilla replaced Antonio Arias, who originally replaced Carlos Torres)

Assistant: Nicolás Yegros

(Peru) Víctor Hugo Rivera

Assistant: Luis Abadie

(Uruguay) Roberto Silvera

Assistant: Miguel Nievas

(Venezuela) Juan Soto

Assistant: Luis Sánchez

(Costa Rica) Wálter Quesada

Assistant: Leonel Leal

(Mexico) Francisco Chacón

Assistant: Marvin Torrentera

Extra assistants: (Argentina) Diego Bonfa, Hernán Maidana

== Group stage ==
The first round, or group stage, saw the twelve teams divided into three groups of four teams. Each group was a round-robin of three games, where each team played one match against each of the other teams in the same group. Teams were awarded three points for a win, one point for a draw and none for a defeat. The teams finishing first and second in each group, and the two best-placed third teams, qualified for the quarter-finals.

Tie-breaking criteria

Teams were ranked on the following criteria:

1. Greater number of points in all group matches
2. Goal difference in all group matches
3. Greater number of goals scored in all group matches
4. Head-to-head results
5. Drawing of lots by the CONMEBOL Organising Committee

However, those normal tiebreaking criteria do not apply if on the last round of group stage, two teams are playing each other and tied by points 1–4 then drew the final game and no other teams are tied. In that case, their ranking is decided by a penalty shoot-out.

Key to colors in group tables
Teams that advanced to the quarter-finals: Group winners; Group runners-up; Best two third-placed teams

All times are in local, Argentina Time (UTC−03:00).

=== Group A ===
Team	Pld	W	D	L	GF	GA	GD	Pts
Colombia	3	2	1	0	3	0	+3	7
Argentina (H)	3	1	2	0	4	1	+3	5
Costa Rica	3	1	0	2	2	4	−2	3
Bolivia	3	0	1	2	1	5	−4	1

(H) Hosts

1 July 2011
Argentina	1–1	Bolivia	Estadio Ciudad de La Plata, La Plata
2 July 2011
Colombia	1–0	Costa Rica	Estadio 23 de Agosto, Jujuy
6 July 2011
Argentina	0–0	Colombia	Estadio Brigadier General Estanislao López, Santa Fe
7 July 2011
Bolivia	0–2	Costa Rica	Estadio 23 de Agosto, Jujuy
10 July 2011
Colombia	2–0	Bolivia	Estadio Brigadier General Estanislao López, Santa Fe
11 July 2011
Argentina	3–0	Costa Rica	Estadio Mario Alberto Kempes, Córdoba

=== Group B ===
Team	Pld	W	D	L	GF	GA	GD	Pts
Brazil	3	1	2	0	6	4	+2	5
Venezuela	3	1	2	0	4	3	+1	5
Paraguay	3	0	3	0	5	5	0	3
Ecuador	3	0	1	2	2	5	−3	1

3 July 2011
Brazil	0–0	Venezuela	Estadio Ciudad de La Plata, La Plata
Paraguay	0–0	Ecuador	Estadio Brigadier General Estanislao López, Santa Fe
9 July 2011
Brazil	2–2	Paraguay	Estadio Mario Alberto Kempes, Córdoba
Venezuela	1–0	Ecuador	Estadio Padre Ernesto Martearena, Salta
13 July 2011
Paraguay	3–3	Venezuela	Estadio Padre Ernesto Martearena, Salta
Brazil	4–2	Ecuador	Estadio Mario Alberto Kempes, Córdoba

=== Group C ===
Team	Pld	W	D	L	GF	GA	GD	Pts
Chile	3	2	1	0	4	2	+2	7
Uruguay	3	1	2	0	3	2	+1	5
Peru	3	1	1	1	2	2	0	4
Mexico	3	0	0	3	1	4	−3	0

4 July 2011
Uruguay	1–1	Peru	Estadio del Bicentenario, San Juan
Chile	2–1	Mexico	Estadio del Bicentenario, San Juan
8 July 2011
Uruguay	1–1	Chile	Estadio Malvinas Argentinas, Mendoza
Peru	1–0	Mexico	Estadio Malvinas Argentinas, Mendoza
12 July 2011
Chile	1–0	Peru	Estadio Malvinas Argentinas, Mendoza
Uruguay	1–0	Mexico	Estadio Ciudad de La Plata, La Plata

=== Ranking of third-placed teams ===
At the end of the first stage, a comparison was made between the third-placed teams of each group. The two best third-placed teams advanced to the quarter-finals.

Grp	Team	Pld	W	D	L	GF	GA	GD	Pts
C	Peru	3	1	1	1	2	2	0	4
B	Paraguay	3	0	3	0	5	5	0	3
A	Costa Rica	3	1	0	2	2	4	−2	3

== Knockout stage ==
Different from previous tournaments, in the knockout stage, 30 minutes of extra time were played if any match finished tied after regulation (previously the match would go straight to a penalty shoot-out). This was the first time in the history of the tournament where the knockout stage did not include any invited teams, as both Mexico and Costa Rica were eliminated during the group stage. Paraguay reached the final despite not having won a single match in the competition.

=== Bracket ===
Quarter-finals
July 16 - Córdoba
Colombia	0
Peru (a.e.t.)	2
July 16 - Santa Fe
Argentina	1 (4)
Uruguay (p)	1 (5)
July 17 - La Plata
Brazil	0 (0)
Paraguay (p)	0 (2)
July 17 - San Juan
Chile	1
Venezuela	2

Semi-finals
July 19 - La Plata
Peru	0
Uruguay	2
July 20 - Mendoza
Paraguay (p)	0 (5)
Venezuela	0 (3)

Final
July 24 - Buenos Aires
Uruguay	3
Paraguay	0
Third place play-off
July 23 - La Plata
Peru	4
Venezuela	1

=== Quarter-finals ===
16 July 2011
16:00

Colombia	0–2 (a.e.t.)	Peru
	Report	Lobatón 101'; Vargas 112'

Estadio Mario Alberto Kempes, Córdoba
Attendance: 30,000
Referee: Francisco Chacón (Mexico)

16 July 2011
19:15

Argentina	1–1 (a.e.t.)	Uruguay
Higuaín 17'	Report	Pérez 5'
Penalties
Messi (penalty scored); Burdisso (penalty scored); Tevez (penalty missed); Pastore (penalty scored); Higuaín (penalty scored)	4–5	(penalty scored) Forlán; (penalty scored) Suárez; (penalty scored) Scotti; (penalty scored) Gargano; (penalty scored) Cáceres

Estadio Brigadier General Estanislao López, Santa Fe
Attendance: 47,000
Referee: Carlos Amarilla (Paraguay)

17 July 2011
16:00

Brazil	0–0 (a.e.t.)	Paraguay
	Report
Penalties
Elano (penalty missed); Thiago Silva (penalty missed); André Santos (penalty missed); Fred (penalty missed)	0–2	(penalty missed) É. Barreto; (penalty scored) Estigarribia; (penalty scored) Riveros

Estadio Ciudad de La Plata, La Plata
Attendance: 36,000
Referee: Sergio Pezzotta (Argentina)

17 July 2011
19:15

Chile	1–2	Venezuela
Suazo 69'	Report	Vizcarrondo 34'; Cichero 80'

Estadio del Bicentenario, San Juan
Attendance: 23,000
Referee: Carlos Vera (Ecuador)

=== Semi-finals ===
19 July 2011
21:45

Peru	0–2	Uruguay
	Report	Suárez 52', 57'

Estadio Ciudad de La Plata, La Plata
Attendance: 25,000
Referee: Raúl Orosco (Bolivia)

20 July 2011
21:45

Paraguay	0–0 (a.e.t.)	Venezuela
	Report
Penalties
Ortigoza (penalty scored); Barrios (penalty scored); Riveros (penalty scored); Martínez (penalty scored); Verón (penalty scored)	5–3	(penalty scored) Maldonado; (penalty scored) Rey; (penalty missed) Lucena; (penalty scored) Miku

Estadio Malvinas Argentinas, Mendoza
Attendance: 8,000
Referee: Francisco Chacón (Mexico)

=== Third place play-off ===
23 July 2011
16:00

Peru	4–1	Venezuela
Chiroque 41'; Guerrero 63', 89', 90+2'	Report	Arango 77'

Estadio Ciudad de La Plata, La Plata
Attendance: 20,000
Referee: Wilmar Roldán (Colombia)

=== Final ===
24 July 2011
16:00

Uruguay	3–0	Paraguay
Suárez 11'; Forlán 41', 89'	Report

Estadio Monumental Antonio Vespucio Liberti, Buenos Aires
Attendance: 57,921
Referee: Sálvio Fagundes (Brazil)

== Result ==
2011 Copa América champions

Uruguay
15th title

== Goalscorers ==
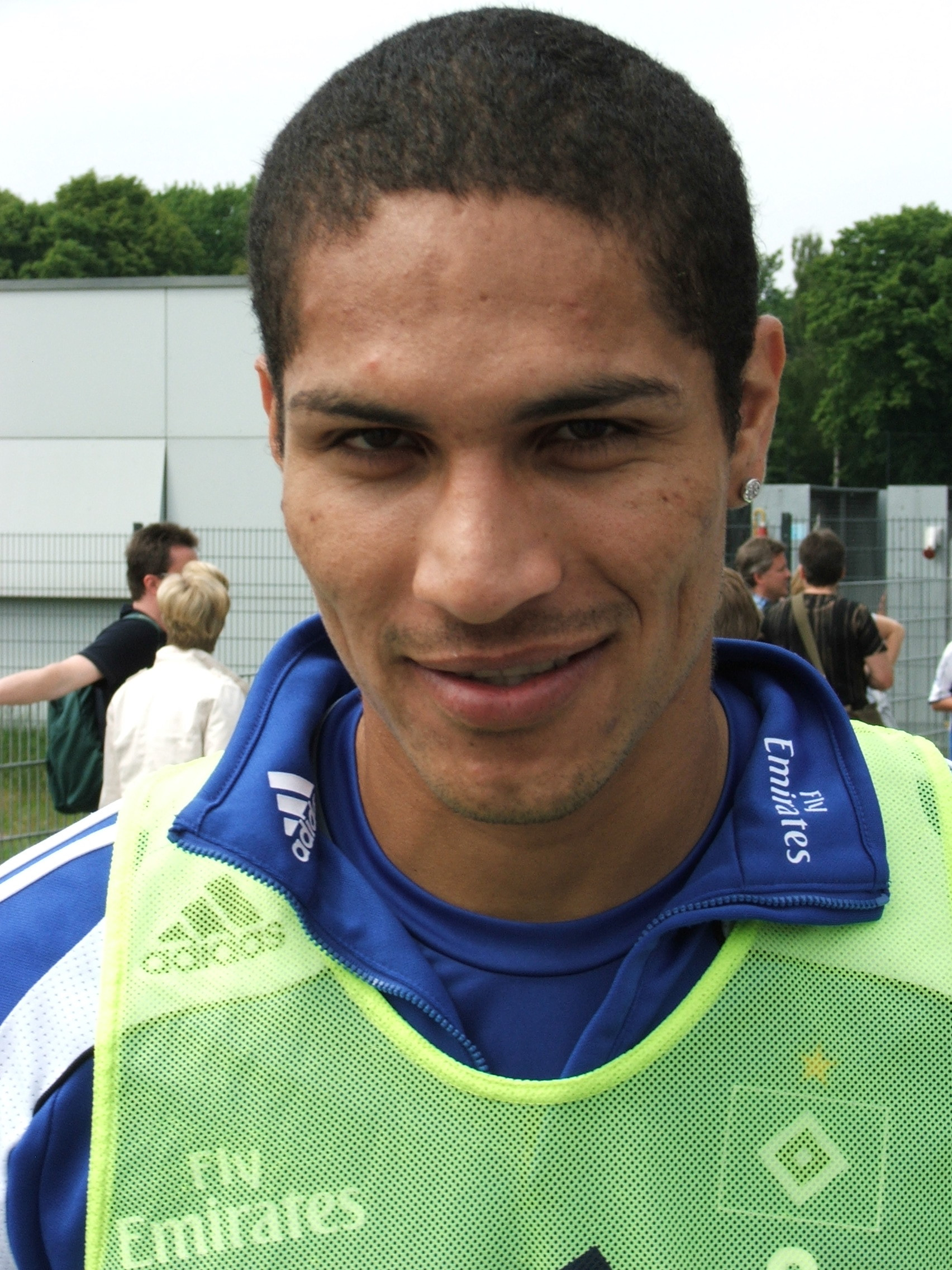
Paolo Guerrero, top scorer

With five goals, Paolo Guerrero of Peru was the top scorer in the tournament. There were 54 goals scored in 26 matches, for an average of 2.08 goals per match.

5 goals

- (Peru) Paolo Guerrero

4 goals

- (Uruguay) Luis Suárez

3 goals

- (Argentina) Sergio Agüero

2 goals

- (Brazil) Neymar
- (Brazil) Alexandre Pato
- (Colombia) Radamel Falcao
- (Ecuador) Felipe Caicedo
- (Uruguay) Diego Forlán
- (Uruguay) Álvaro Pereira

1 goal

- (Argentina) Ángel Di María
- (Argentina) Gonzalo Higuaín
- (Bolivia) Edivaldo Hermoza
- (Brazil) Fred
- (Brazil) Jádson
- (Chile) Esteban Paredes
- (Chile) Alexis Sánchez
- (Chile) Humberto Suazo
- (Chile) Arturo Vidal
- (Colombia) Adrián Ramos
- (Costa Rica) Joel Campbell
- (Costa Rica) Josué Martínez
- (Mexico) Néstor Araujo
- (Paraguay) Antolín Alcaraz
- (Paraguay) Lucas Barrios
- (Paraguay) Nelson Valdez
- (Paraguay) Cristian Riveros
- (Paraguay) Roque Santa Cruz
- (Peru) William Chiroque
- (Peru) Carlos Lobatón
- (Peru) Juan Manuel Vargas
- (Uruguay) Diego Pérez
- (Venezuela) Juan Arango
- (Venezuela) Gabriel Cichero
- (Venezuela) Miku
- (Venezuela) César González
- (Venezuela) Grenddy Perozo
- (Venezuela) Salomón Rondón
- (Venezuela) Oswaldo Vizcarrondo

1 own goal

- (Peru) André Carrillo (against Chile)

== Statistics ==
=== Winners ===
2011 Copa América champions

Uruguay

=== Awards ===
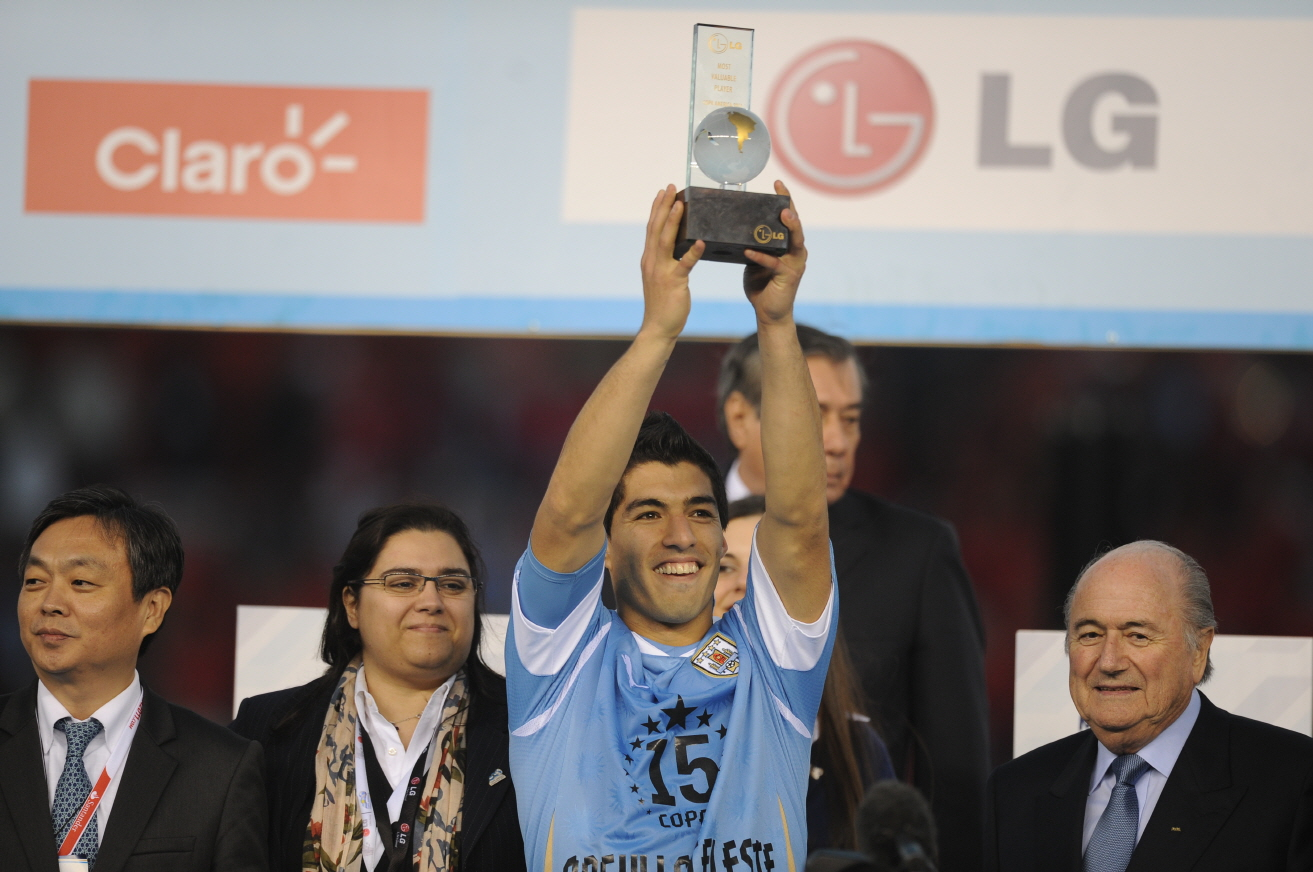
Uruguay player Luis Suárez, awarded as MVP of the tournament.

- Most Valuable Player: (Uruguay) Luis Suárez
- Top Goalscorer: (Peru) Paolo Guerrero (5 goals)
- Best Young Player: (Uruguay) Sebastián Coates
- Best Goalkeeper: (Paraguay) Justo Villar
- Fair Play Trophy: Uruguay

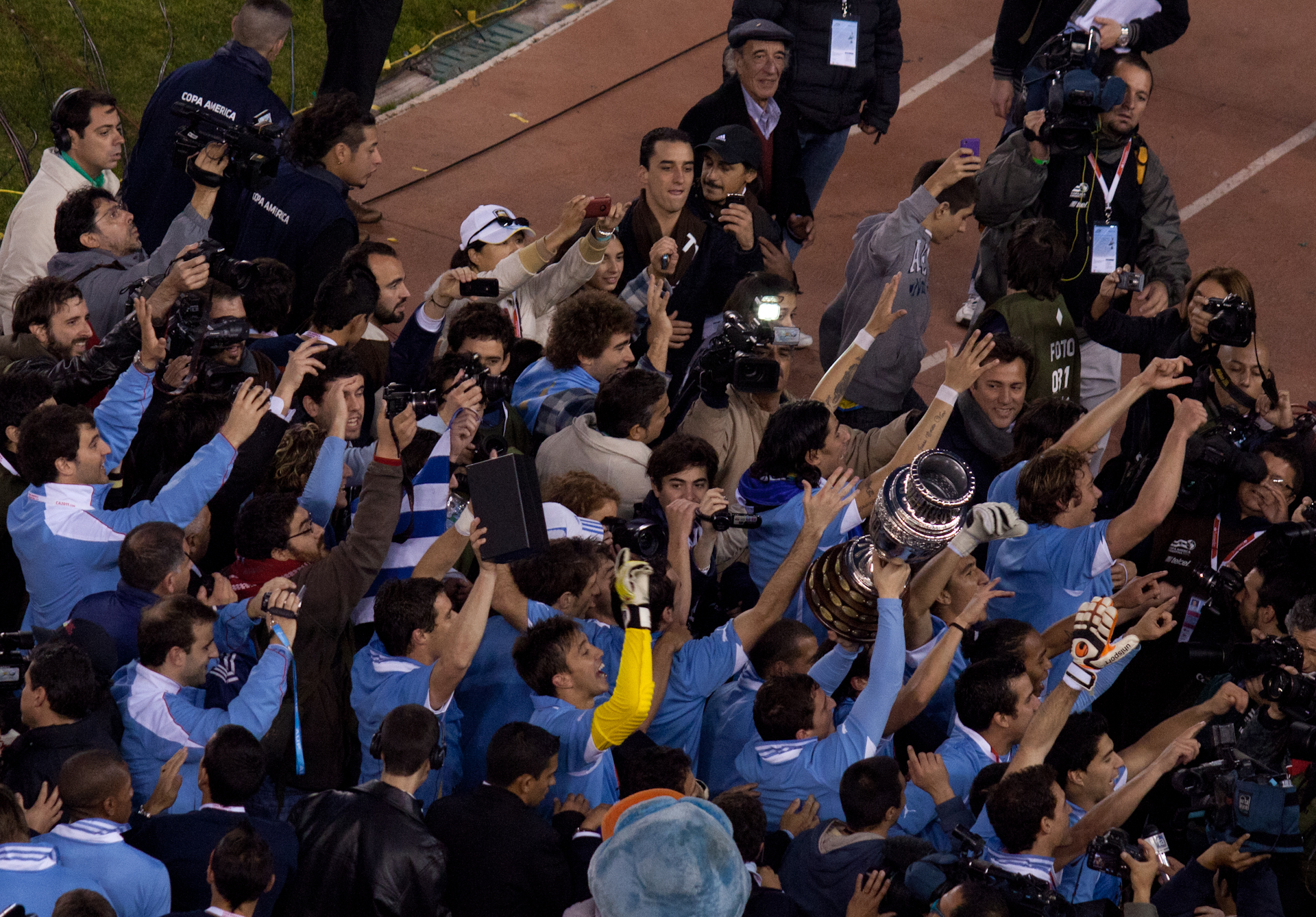
Uruguayan players celebrating their fifteenth Copa América title.

=== Man of the Match Award ===
- (Uruguay) Luis Suárez

=== Team of the Tournament ===
Goalkeeper	Defenders	Midfielders	Forwards	Manager
(Venezuela) Renny Vega	(Colombia) Luis Amaranto Perea (Uruguay) Diego Lugano (Paraguay) Paulo Da Silva	(Argentina) Javier Mascherano (Colombia) Fredy Guarín (Uruguay) Álvaro Pereira (Peru) Carlos Lobatón	(Argentina) Lionel Messi (Uruguay) Luis Suárez (Peru) Paolo Guerrero	Óscar Tabárez (Uruguay)

== Marketing ==
=== Sponsorship ===
Global Platinum Sponsor:

- LG
- MasterCard
- Santander

Global Gold Sponsor:

- Kia
- América Móvil (Claro, Telcel, Telmex, Embratel, and Comcel (former) are the brands advertised.)

Global Silver Sponsor:

- Canon
- Anheuser-Busch (Brahma, Budweiser, and Quilmes are the brands advertised.)
- The Coca-Cola Company (Coca-Cola and Powerade are the brands advertised.)
- Petrobras (Lubrax is the brand advertised.)

Official Supplier:

- Seara (Paty is the brand advertised.)

Charitable Partner:

- UNICEF

Local Supplier:

- Buenos Aires Province
- Argentina
- Gillette

Web Hosting:

- UOL Host

=== Theme song ===
"Creo en América" (English: I Believe in America) by Argentine singer Diego Torres was the official theme song for the tournament. Torres performed the song during the opening ceremonies. A secondary theme song for the tournament is "Ready 2 Go" by Martin Solveig featuring Kele.
