= Diego Pérez (footballer) =

Uruguayan footballer (born 1980)

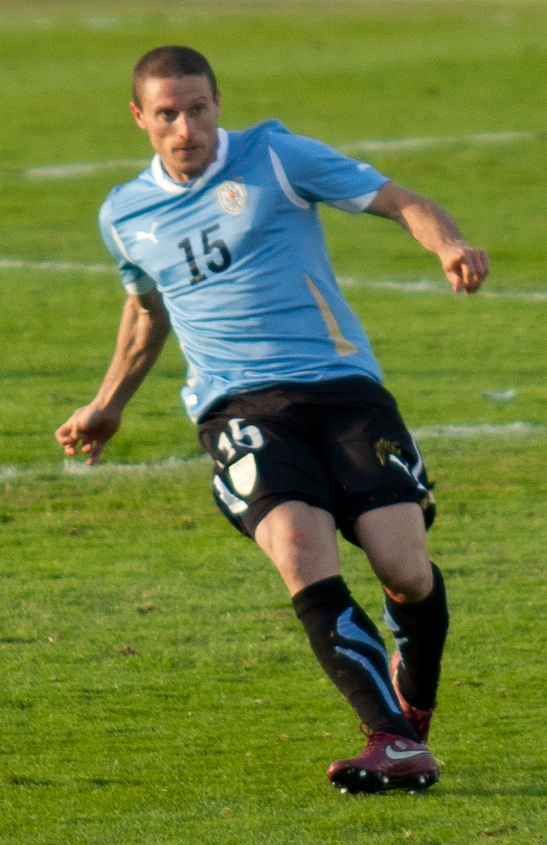
- Pérez with Uruguay in 2011

Personal information
- Full name: Diego Fernando Pérez Aguado
- Date of birth: 18 May 1980 (age 46)
- Place of birth: Montevideo, Uruguay
- Height: 1.78 m (5 ft 10 in)
- Position: Defensive midfielder

Team information
- Current team: Uruguay (assistant coach); Uruguay U20 (assistant coach)

Senior career*
Years	Team	Apps	(Gls)
1999–2003	Defensor Sporting	138	(12)
2003–2004	Peñarol	13	(2)
2004–2010	Monaco	146	(2)
2010–2015	Bologna	108	(0)
Total		405	(16)

International career
2001–2014	Uruguay	89	(2)

Managerial career
- 2024: Uruguay U20 (caretaker)
- 2024: Uruguay local
- 2025: Uruguay U18
- 2026: Uruguay U20 (caretaker)
- 2026: Uruguay U16
Medal record
Representing Uruguay
Copa América
Winner	2011 Argentina
Third place	2004 Peru
- * Club domestic league appearances and goals

Diego Fernando Pérez Aguado (Spanish pronunciation: [ˈdjeɣo ˈpeɾes]; born 18 May 1980) is a Uruguayan professional football manager and former player who played as a defensive midfielder. He is the assistant coach of the Uruguay national team and the Uruguay under-20 national team.

Nicknamed "El Ruso" (lit. 'the Russian'), Pérez played for five years in Uruguay before playing several years for AS Monaco and Bologna. Internationally, Pérez appeared in 89 matches for the Uruguay national football team, including the 2010 FIFA World Cup and the 2001, 2004, 2007 and 2011 editions of the Copa América.

== Club career ==
Pérez was born in Montevideo. At the age of 19, Pérez joined one of the clubs of his hometown, Defensor Sporting, soon becoming a first-team regular. He joined a larger club from Montevideo, C.A. Peñarol, in 2003 but only played 13 games with them before being shipped off to France to play for AS Monaco under then-manager Didier Deschamps.

=== Monaco ===
During his time at Monaco he had to battle for his place in the defensive midfield spot against Lucas Bernardi, Akis Zikos and Gerard López and was especially favored by the manager Francesco Guidolin during the Italian's reign in the 2005–06 season.

=== Bologna ===
On 31 August 2010, he was signed by Italian Serie A team Bologna for €2.1 million (including 5% solidarity contribution to youth clubs). No fee was scheduled to pay on that day, but 2 equal installments was scheduled on 31 December 2010 and 30 June 2011. At Bologna, he has teamed up with fellow Uruguayan internationals, Henry Damián Giménez, Gastón Ramírez and Miguel Britos, before this left the squad to join S.S.C. Napoli. In Pérez first season in the Serie A, Bologna managed 16th place and finished six points clear of relegation, confirming a fourth successive season in the Italian top flight. He also managed three assists during the campaign, tied for most on the team along with Riccardo Meggiorini.

After being without a club for 1 1/2 months, Pérez signed a new two-year contract with Bologna in August 2013. He retired at the end of the 2014–15 season.

== International career ==
Pérez was capped for Uruguay in four successive editions of the Copa América, helping his country lift their 15th South American championship in 2011. He was also selected to 2010 FIFA World Cup. On 16 July 2011, he scored his first goal for the national team in a match against hosts Argentina in the Copa America quarterfinals, although he was also sent off in the same match. Pérez was back for the final match against Paraguay, starting in defensive midfield in a 3–0 win.

== Managerial career ==
Pérez was the assistant manager of the Uruguay under-20 team which won the 2023 FIFA U-20 World Cup and finished as runners-up at the 2023 South American U-20 Championship. In May 2024, Pérez was named as the first ever manager of the Uruguay local national team.

On 6 August 2026, Pérez was appointed assistant coach to Diego Forlán with the Uruguay national team.

== Personal life ==
His older brother Omar Pérez is also a professional footballer, who played for Cerro as a midfielder.

== Career statistics ==
=== International ===
Appearances and goals by national team and year
National team	Year	Apps	Goals
Uruguay	2001	8	0
Uruguay	2002	3	0
Uruguay	2003	0	0
Uruguay	2004	6	0
Uruguay	2005	5	0
Uruguay	2006	3	0
Uruguay	2007	10	0
Uruguay	2008	5	0
Uruguay	2009	8	0
Uruguay	2010	12	0
Uruguay	2011	14	1
Uruguay	2012	6	0
Uruguay	2013	7	1
Uruguay	2014	2	0
Total		89	2

=== International goals ===
#	Date	Venue	Opponent	Score	Result	Competition
1.	16 July 2011	Estadio Brigadier General Estanislao López, Santa Fe, Argentina	Argentina	1–0	1–1	2011 Copa América
2.	23 June 2013	Itaipava Arena Pernambuco, Recife, Brazil	Tahiti	3–0	8–0	2013 FIFA Confederations Cup
Correct as of 7 October 2015

== Honours ==
=== International ===
Uruguay

- Copa América Winner: 2011; Third Place: 2004; Fourth Place: 2001, 2007
- FIFA World Cup Fourth Place: 2010
