= 2015 Copa América disciplinary record =

In the 2015 Copa América, the main disciplinary action taken against players came in the form of red and yellow cards.

Any player picking up a red card was expelled from the pitch and automatically banned for his country's next match, whether via a straight red or second yellow. After a straight red card, FIFA would conduct a hearing and could extend this ban beyond one match. If the ban extended beyond the end of the finals (i.e. if a player was sent off in the match in which his team was eliminated), it had to be served in the team's next competitive international match(es). In most cases, that was the first matches of 2018 FIFA World Cup qualifying.

== Disciplinary statistics ==
- Total number of yellow cards: 113
- Average yellow cards per match: 4.71
- Total number of red cards: 7
- Average red cards per match: 0.25
- First yellow card: Fidel Martínez (Ecuador against Chile)
- First red card: Matías Fernández (Chile against Ecuador)
- Fastest yellow card from kick off: 5 minutes (Abel Hernández; Uruguay against Paraguay)
- Fastest yellow card after coming on as substitute: 1 minute (Derlis González; Paraguay against Argentina and Franklin Lucena; Venezuela against Colombia)
- Latest yellow card in a match without extra time: 90+2 minutes (Matías Fernández; Chile against Ecuador)
- Fastest dismissal from kick off: 21 minutes (Carlos Zambrano; Peru against Chile)
- Fastest dismissal of a substitute: 18 minutes (Carlos Bacca; Colombia against Brazil)
- Latest dismissal in a match without extra time: 90+4 minutes (Carlos Bacca; Colombia against Brazil and Neymar; Brazil against Colombia)
- Least time difference between two yellow cards given to the same player: 19 minutes (Matías Fernández; Chile against Ecuador)
- Most yellow cards (team): 14 (Paraguay)
- Most red cards (team): 2 (Uruguay)
- Fewest yellow cards (team): 4 (Mexico)
- Most yellow cards (player): 3 (Richard Ortiz)
- Most red cards (player): 1 (Fernando Amorebieta, Carlos Bacca, Edinson Cavani, Jorge Fucile, Matías Fernández, Neymar, Carlos Zambrano)
- Most yellow cards (match): 8 (Argentina against Colombia)
- Most red cards (match): 2 (Chile against Uruguay, Brazil against Colombia)
- Fewest yellow cards (match): 1 (Chile against Peru)
- Most cards in one match: 6 yellow cards, 2 red cards (Chile against Uruguay)

== Detailed statistics ==
=== By match ===
Day	Match	Round	Referee	Total cards	Yellow	Second yellow	Straight red
Day 1	Chile vs Ecuador	Group A	(Argentina) Néstor Pitana	5	4	1	0
Day 2	Mexico vs Bolivia	Group A	(Paraguay) Enrique Cáceres	3	3	0	0
Day 3	Uruguay vs Jamaica	Group B	(Venezuela) José Argote	3	3	0	0
Day 3	Argentina vs Paraguay	Group B	(Colombia) Wilmar Roldán	6	6	0	0
Day 4	Colombia vs Venezuela	Group C	(Uruguay) Andrés Cunha	7	7	0	0
Day 4	Brazil vs Peru	Group C	(Mexico) Roberto Garía	4	4	0	0
Day 5	Ecuador vs Bolivia	Group A	(El Salvador) Joel Aguilar	5	5	0	0
Day 5	Chile vs Mexico	Group A	(Peru) Víctor Hugo Carrillo	2	2	0	0
Day 6	Paraguay vs Jamaica	Group B	(Ecuador) Carlos Vera	3	3	0	0
Day 6	Argentina vs Uruguay	Group B	(Brazil) Sandro Ricci	6	6	0	0
Day 7	Brazil vs Colombia	Group C	(Chile) Enrique Osses	6	4	0	2
Day 8	Peru vs Venezuela	Group C	(Bolivia) Raúl Orosco	5	4	0	1
Day 9	Mexico vs Ecuador	Group A	(Venezuela) José Argote	6	6	0	0
Day 9	Chile vs Bolivia	Group A	(Uruguay) Andrés Cunha	3	3	0	0
Day 10	Uruguay vs Paraguay	Group B	(Mexico) Roberto García	6	6	0	0
Day 10	Argentina vs Jamaica	Group B	(Chile) Julio Bascuñán	5	5	0	0
Day 11	Colombia vs Peru	Group C	(Argentina) Néstor Pitana	5	5	0	0
Day 11	Brazil vs Venezuela	Group C	(Paraguay) Enrique Cáceres	4	4	0	0
Day 14	Chile vs Uruguay	Quarterfinal	(Brazil) Sandro Ricci	8	6	2	0
Day 15	Bolivia vs Peru	Quarterfinal	(Colombia) Wilmar Roldán	7	7	0	0
Day 16	Argentina vs Colombia	Quarterfinal	(Mexico) Roberto García	8	8	0	0
Day 17	Brazil vs Paraguay	Quarterfinal	(Uruguay) Andrés Cunha	5	5	0	0
Day 19	Chile vs Peru	Semifinal	(Venezuela) José Argote	2	1	0	1
Day 20	Argentina vs Paraguay	Semifinal	(Brazil) Sandro Ricci	5	5	0	0
Day 23	Peru vs Paraguay	Third place match	(Bolivia) Raúl Orosco	3	3	0	0
Day 24	Chile vs Argentina	Final	(Colombia) Wilmar Roldán	7	7	0	0

=== By referee ===
Referee	Matches	Red	Yellow	Red Cards	PKs awarded
(Brazil) Sandro Ricci	3	3	17	1 straight reds 2 second yellows	0
(Venezuela) José Argote	3	2	10	2 straight reds	1
(Chile) Enrique Osses	1	2	4	2 straight reds	0
(Argentina) Néstor Pitana	2	1	9	1 second yellow	1
(Colombia) Wilmar Roldán	3	0	20		2
(Mexico) Roberto García	3	0	18		0
(Uruguay) Andrés Cunha	3	0	15		1
(Paraguay) Enrique Cáceres	2	0	7		0
(Bolivia) Raúl Orosco	2	0	7		0
(El Salvador) Joel Aguilar	1	0	5		1
(Chile) Julio Bascuñán	1	0	5		0
(Ecuador) Carlos Vera	1	0	3		0
(Peru) Víctor Hugo Carrillo	1	0	2		1

=== By team ===
Team	Yellow	Red	Red Cards	Reason
Uruguay	11	3	Edinson Cavani vs Chile second yellow Jorge Fucile vs Chile second yellow	
Peru	14	1	Carlos Zambrano vs Chile straight red	
Chile	12	1	Matías Fernández vs Ecuador second yellow	
Colombia	11	1	Carlos Bacca vs Brazil straight red	
Brazil	9	1	Neymar vs Colombia straight red	
Venezuela	8	1	Fernando Amorebieta vs Peru straight red	
Argentina	15	0		
Paraguay	15	0		
Bolivia	12	0		
Ecuador	7	0		
Jamaica	6	0		
Mexico	4	0		

== By player ==
1 red card

- (Brazil) Neymar
- (Chile) Matías Fernández
- (Colombia) Carlos Bacca
- (Peru) Carlos Zambrano
- (Uruguay) Edinson Cavani
- (Uruguay) Jorge Fucile
- (Venezuela) Fernando Amorebieta

3 yellow cards

- (Argentina) Javier Mascherano
- (Argentina) Marcos Rojo
- (Paraguay) Richard Ortiz

2 yellow cards

- (Bolivia) Danny Bejarano
- (Bolivia) Pablo Escobar
- (Brazil) Neymar
- (Chile) Matías Fernández
- (Chile) Mauricio Pinilla
- (Colombia) James Rodríguez
- (Colombia) Carlos Sánchez
- (Ecuador) Osbaldo Lastra
- (Jamaica) Rodolph Austin
- (Paraguay) Pablo Aguilar
- (Paraguay) Bruno Valdez
- (Peru) Josepmir Ballón
- (Peru) Paolo Guerrero
- (Peru) Carlos Lobatón
- (Peru) Yoshimar Yotún
- (Uruguay) Edinson Cavani
- (Uruguay) Jorge Fucile
- (Uruguay) Diego Godín
- (Uruguay) Álvaro Pereira
- (Venezuela) Luis Manuel Seijas

1 yellow card

- (Argentina) Sergio Agüero
- (Argentina) Éver Banega
- (Argentina) Lucas Biglia
- (Argentina) Lionel Messi
- (Argentina) Nicolás Otamendi
- (Argentina) Javier Pastore
- (Argentina) Sergio Romero
- (Argentina) Facundo Roncaglia
- (Argentina) Pablo Zabaleta
- (Bolivia) Alejandro Chumacero
- (Bolivia) Cristian Coimbra
- (Bolivia) Miguel Hurtado
- (Bolivia) Leonel Morales
- (Bolivia) Marcelo Moreno
- (Bolivia) Ricardo Pedriel
- (Bolivia) Romel Quiñónez
- (Bolivia) Edward Zenteno
- (Brazil) Dani Alves
- (Brazil) Philippe Coutinho
- (Brazil) Fernandinho
- (Brazil) Roberto Firmino
- (Brazil) Filipe Luís
- (Brazil) Thiago Silva
- (Chile) Charles Aránguiz
- (Chile) Marcelo Díaz
- (Chile) Mauricio Isla
- (Chile) Gonzalo Jara
- (Chile) Gary Medel
- (Chile) Francisco Silva
- (Chile) Jorge Valdivia
- (Chile) Arturo Vidal
- (Colombia) Santiago Arias
- (Colombia) Juan Cuadrado
- (Colombia) Radamel Falcao
- (Colombia) Teófilo Gutiérrez
- (Colombia) Alexander Mejía
- (Colombia) Cristián Zapata
- (Colombia) Juan Camilo Zúñiga
- (Ecuador) Miller Bolaños
- (Ecuador) Frickson Erazo
- (Ecuador) Renato Ibarra
- (Ecuador) Fidel Martínez
- (Ecuador) Pedro Quiñónez
- (Jamaica) Michael Hector
- (Jamaica) Jobi McAnuff
- (Jamaica) Wes Morgan
- (Jamaica) Jevaughn Watson
- (Mexico) Hugo Ayala
- (Mexico) Marco Fabián
- (Mexico) Gerardo Flores
- (Mexico) Eduardo Herrera
- (Paraguay) Lucas Barrios
- (Paraguay) Víctor Cáceres
- (Paraguay) Paulo da Silva
- (Paraguay) Derlis González
- (Paraguay) Osvaldo Martínez
- (Paraguay) Osmar Molinas
- (Paraguay) Miguel Samudio
- (Paraguay) Néstor Ortigoza
- (Peru) Luis Advíncula
- (Peru) Jefferson Farfán
- (Peru) Pedro Gallese
- (Peru) Claudio Pizarro
- (Peru) Juan Manuel Vargas
- (Peru) Carlos Zambrano
- (Uruguay) Sebastián Coates
- (Uruguay) José Giménez
- (Uruguay) Nicolás Lodeiro
- (Uruguay) Abel Hernández
- (Uruguay) Maxi Pereira
- (Venezuela) Fernando Amorebieta
- (Venezuela) Gabriel Cichero
- (Venezuela) Franklin Lucena
- (Venezuela) Andrés Túñez
- (Venezuela) Ronald Vargas
- (Venezuela) Oswaldo Vizcarrondo

== Fair Play Award ==
The Fair Play Award was given to the team with the best overall discipline throughout the tournament, Peru. Teams were given a certain number of points — 15 in the first stage, 5 in the quarter-finals, and 10 points for the remaining four teams — from which points were deducted depending on the infraction. As the team that advanced past the first stage with the most points, Peru were awarded the trophy. Teams that drop below 0 points were excluded from winning the award.

Infraction	Points deducted
Booking of a player (yellow card)	1 point
Expulsion of a player (red card)	2 points
Suspension per game	1 point
Delay of game at the start of restart of a match	2 points
Misconduct of the players and/or coaching staff	1 point
Recidivism of misconduct	2 points
Incomplete team	1 point
Abandonment of the game	Exclusion
Others	Case-by-case judgement
