= 2015 Copa América Group A =

Group A of the 2015 Copa América was one of the three groups of competing nations in the 2015 Copa América. It consisted of hosts Chile, guests Mexico of CONCACAF, Ecuador, and Bolivia. Group play began on 11 June 2015 and ended on 19 June 2015.

Chile and Bolivia advanced to the quarter-finals.

== Teams ==
| Draw position | Team | Appearance | Previous best performance | FIFA Rankings | |
| Draw position | Team | Appearance | Previous best performance | October 2014 (Note: The rankings of October 2014 were used for seeding for the draw.) | Start of event |
|---|---|---|---|---|---|
| A1 | Chile | 37th | Runners-up (1955, 1956, 1979, 1987) | 13 | 19 |
| A2 | Mexico | 9th | Runners-up (1993, 2001) | 17 | 23 |
| A3 | Ecuador | 26th | Fourth place (1959 (E), 1993) | 27 | 31 |
| A4 | Bolivia | 25th | Winners (1963) | 103 | 89 |

== Standings ==
| Pos | Team | Pld | W | D | L | GF | GA | GD | Pts | Qualification |
|---|---|---|---|---|---|---|---|---|---|---|
| 1 | Chile (H) | 3 | 2 | 1 | 0 | 10 | 3 | +7 | 7 | Advance to knockout stage |
| 2 | Bolivia | 3 | 1 | 1 | 1 | 3 | 7 | −4 | 4 | Advance to knockout stage |
| 3 | Ecuador | 3 | 1 | 0 | 2 | 4 | 6 | −2 | 3 | |
| 4 | Mexico | 3 | 0 | 2 | 1 | 4 | 5 | −1 | 2 | |

Source: CONMEBOL
Rules for classification: Tie-breaking criteria
(H) Hosts

In the quarter-finals:

- Chile advanced to play Uruguay (third-placed team of Group B).
- Bolivia advanced to play Peru (runners-up of Group C).

== Matches ==
All times local, CLT (UTC−3).

=== Chile vs Ecuador ===
11 June 2015
20:30

| Chile | 2–0 | Ecuador |
|---|---|---|
| Vidal 66' (pen.); Vargas 83' | Report |

Estadio Nacional, Santiago
Attendance: 46,000
Referee: Néstor Pitana (Argentina)

| Chile | Ecuador |

| GK | 1 | Claudio Bravo (c) |
| RB | 4 | Mauricio Isla |
| CB | 17 | Gary Medel |
| CB | 18 | Gonzalo Jara | (yellow card) 31' |
| LB | 2 | Eugenio Mena |
| RM | 20 | Charles Aránguiz | | (substituted off) 84' |
| CM | 21 | Marcelo Díaz |
| LM | 8 | Arturo Vidal |
| AM | 10 | Jorge Valdivia | | (substituted off) 67' |
| CF | 7 | Alexis Sánchez |
| CF | 15 | Jean Beausejour | | (substituted off) 46' |
Substitutions:
| FW | 11 | Eduardo Vargas | | (substituted on) 46' |
| MF | 14 | Matías Fernández | (yellow card) 73' (yellow-red card) 90+2' | (substituted on) 67' |
| MF | 16 | David Pizarro | | (substituted on) 84' |
Manager:
(Argentina) Jorge Sampaoli

| GK | 23 | Alexander Domínguez |
| RB | 4 | Juan Carlos Paredes |
| CB | 21 | Gabriel Achilier |
| CB | 3 | Frickson Erazo |
| LB | 10 | Walter Ayoví (c) |
| CM | 6 | Christian Noboa |
| CM | 14 | Osbaldo Lastra | (yellow card) 41' | (substituted off) 67' |
| RM | 7 | Jefferson Montero |
| AM | 8 | Miller Bolaños |
| LM | 9 | Fidel Martínez | (yellow card) 23' | (substituted off) 79' |
| CF | 13 | Enner Valencia |
Substitutions:
| MF | 15 | Pedro Quiñónez | | (substituted on) 67' |
| MF | 5 | Renato Ibarra | | (substituted on) 79' |
Manager:
(Bolivia) Gustavo Quinteros

Man of the Match:
Arturo Vidal (Chile)

Assistant referees:
Hernán Maidana (Argentina)
Juan Pablo Belatti (Argentina)
Fourth official:
Joel Aguilar (El Salvador)
Fifth official:
Ricardo Morgan (Jamaica)

=== Mexico vs Bolivia ===
12 June 2015
20:30

| Mexico | 0–0 | Bolivia |
|---|---|---|
| | Report |

Estadio Sausalito, Viña del Mar
Attendance: 14,987
Referee: Enrique Cáceres (Paraguay)

| Mexico | Bolivia |

| GK | 1 | José de Jesús Corona |
| CB | 3 | Hugo Ayala |
| CB | 4 | Rafael Márquez (c) | | (substituted off) 63' |
| CB | 2 | Julio César Domínguez |
| RWB | 15 | Gerardo Flores | (yellow card) 89' |
| LWB | 16 | Adrián Aldrete |
| CM | 6 | Javier Güémez |
| CM | 5 | Juan Carlos Medina | | (substituted off) 80' |
| AM | 7 | Jesús Manuel Corona |
| CF | 20 | Eduardo Herrera | | (substituted off) 60' |
| CF | 19 | Matías Vuoso |
Substitutions:
| FW | 9 | Raúl Jiménez | | (substituted on) 60' |
| MF | 11 | Javier Aquino | | (substituted on) 63' |
| MF | 10 | Luis Montes | | (substituted on) 80' |
Manager:
Miguel Herrera

| GK | 1 | Romel Quiñónez |
| RB | 2 | Miguel Hurtado |
| CB | 16 | Ronald Raldes (c) |
| CB | 22 | Edward Zenteno |
| LB | 4 | Leonel Morales |
| RM | 8 | Martin Smedberg-Dalence |
| CM | 3 | Alejandro Chumacero |
| CM | 6 | Danny Bejarano | (yellow card) 32' |
| LM | 20 | Jhasmani Campos | | (substituted off) 70' |
| CF | 18 | Ricardo Pedriel | | (substituted off) 84' |
| CF | 9 | Marcelo Moreno |
Substitutions:
| FW | 10 | Pablo Escobar | (yellow card) 88' | (substituted on) 70' |
| DF | 17 | Marvin Bejarano | | (substituted on) 84' |
Manager:
Mauricio Soria

Man of the Match:
Jesús Manuel Corona (Mexico)

Assistant referees:
Rodney Aquino (Paraguay)
Carlos Cáceres (Paraguay)
Fourth official:
Andrés Cunha (Uruguay)
Fifth official:
Carlos Pastorino (Uruguay)

=== Ecuador vs Bolivia ===
15 June 2015
18:00

| Ecuador | 2–3 | Bolivia |
|---|---|---|
| Valencia 47'; Bolaños 80' | Report | Raldes 4'; Smedberg-Dalence 17'; Moreno 42' (pen.) |

Estadio Elías Figueroa, Valparaíso
Attendance: 5,982
Referee: Joel Aguilar (El Salvador)

| Ecuador | Bolivia |

| GK | 23 | Alexander Domínguez |
| RB | 4 | Juan Carlos Paredes | | (substituted off) 86' |
| CB | 21 | Gabriel Achilier |
| CB | 3 | Frickson Erazo | (yellow card) 43' |
| LB | 10 | Walter Ayoví (c) |
| CM | 6 | Christian Noboa |
| CM | 15 | Pedro Quiñónez | (yellow card) 38' | (substituted off) 46' |
| RM | 9 | Fidel Martínez | | (substituted off) 46' |
| AM | 8 | Miller Bolaños |
| LM | 7 | Jefferson Montero |
| CF | 13 | Enner Valencia |
Substitutions:
| MF | 5 | Renato Ibarra | | (substituted on) 46' |
| MF | 11 | Juan Cazares | | (substituted on) 46' |
| FW | 17 | Daniel Angulo | | (substituted on) 86' |
Manager:
(Bolivia) Gustavo Quinteros

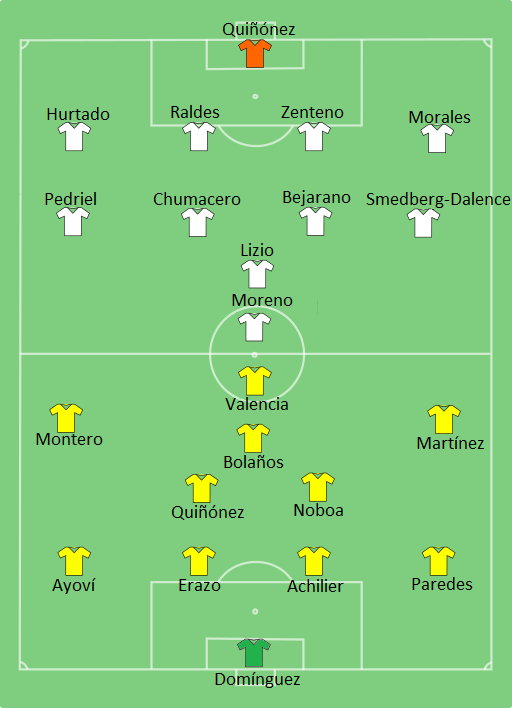

| GK | 1 | Romel Quiñónez | (yellow card) 62' |
| RB | 2 | Miguel Hurtado | (yellow card) 45' |
| CB | 16 | Ronald Raldes (c) |
| CB | 22 | Edward Zenteno | (yellow card) 38' |
| LB | 4 | Leonel Morales |
| RM | 8 | Martin Smedberg-Dalence |
| CM | 3 | Alejandro Chumacero |
| CM | 6 | Danny Bejarano |
| LM | 18 | Ricardo Pedriel | | (substituted off) 57' |
| AM | 11 | Damián Lizio | | (substituted off) 72' |
| CF | 9 | Marcelo Moreno | | (substituted off) 88' |
Substitutions:
| DF | 21 | Cristian Coimbra | | (substituted on) 57' |
| DF | 17 | Marvin Bejarano | | (substituted on) 72' |
| MF | 13 | Damir Miranda | | (substituted on) 88' |
Manager:
Mauricio Soria

Man of the Match:
Romel Quiñónez (Bolivia)

Assistant referees:
Garnet Page (Jamaica)
Ricardo Morgan (Jamaica)
Fourth official:
Wilmar Roldán (Colombia)
Fifth official:
Alexander Guzmán (Colombia)

=== Chile vs Mexico ===
15 June 2015
20:30

| Chile | 3–3 | Mexico |
|---|---|---|
| Vidal 21', 54' (pen.); Vargas 41' | Report | Vuoso 20', 65'; Jiménez 28' |

Estadio Nacional, Santiago
Attendance: 45,583
Referee: Víctor Hugo Carrillo (Peru)

| Chile | Mexico |

| GK | 1 | Claudio Bravo (c) |
| CB | 17 | Gary Medel |
| CB | 18 | Gonzalo Jara |
| CB | 3 | Miiko Albornoz | | (substituted off) 87' |
| RM | 4 | Mauricio Isla |
| CM | 21 | Marcelo Díaz | | (substituted off) 71' |
| CM | 20 | Charles Aránguiz |
| LM | 8 | Arturo Vidal | (yellow card) 37' |
| AM | 10 | Jorge Valdivia |
| CF | 11 | Eduardo Vargas | | (substituted off) 85' |
| CF | 7 | Alexis Sánchez |
Substitutions:
| DF | 2 | Eugenio Mena | | (substituted on) 71' |
| FW | 9 | Mauricio Pinilla | (yellow card) 90' | (substituted on) 85' |
| MF | 15 | Jean Beausejour | | (substituted on) 87' |
Manager:
(Argentina) Jorge Sampaoli

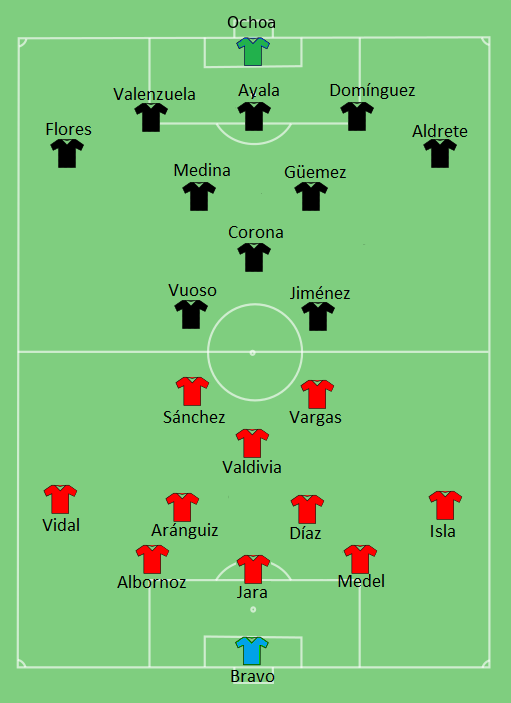

| GK | 1 | José de Jesús Corona (c) |
| CB | 14 | Juan Carlos Valenzuela |
| CB | 3 | Hugo Ayala |
| CB | 2 | Julio César Domínguez |
| RWB | 15 | Gerardo Flores |
| LWB | 16 | Adrián Aldrete | | (substituted off) 71' |
| CM | 5 | Juan Carlos Medina | | (substituted off) 64' |
| CM | 6 | Javier Güémez |
| AM | 7 | Jesús Manuel Corona | (yellow card) 76' | (substituted off) 77' |
| CF | 19 | Matías Vuoso |
| CF | 9 | Raúl Jiménez |
Substitutions:
| MF | 11 | Javier Aquino | | (substituted on) 64' |
| DF | 13 | Carlos Salcedo | | (substituted on) 71' |
| MF | 17 | Mario Osuna | | (substituted on) 77' |
Manager:
Miguel Herrera

Man of the Match:
Arturo Vidal (Chile)

Assistant referees:
César Escano (Peru)
Jonny Bossio (Peru)
Fourth official:
José Argote (Venezuela)
Fifth official:
Rodney Aquino (Paraguay)

=== Mexico vs Ecuador ===
19 June 2015
18:00

| Mexico | 1–2 | Ecuador |
|---|---|---|
| Jiménez 63' (pen.) | Report | Bolaños 25'; Valencia 57' |

Estadio El Teniente, Rancagua
Attendance: 11,051
Referee: José Argote (Venezuela)

| Mexico | Ecuador |

| GK | 1 | José de Jesús Corona (c) |
| CB | 14 | Juan Carlos Valenzuela |
| CB | 3 | Hugo Ayala | (yellow card) 17' |
| CB | 2 | Julio César Domínguez |
| RWB | 15 | Gerardo Flores |
| LWB | 22 | Efraín Velarde | | (substituted off) 46' |
| RM | 5 | Juan Carlos Medina |
| CM | 6 | Javier Güémez | | (substituted off) 52' |
| LM | 7 | Jesús Manuel Corona | | (substituted off) 62' |
| CF | 9 | Raúl Jiménez |
| CF | 19 | Matías Vuoso |
Substitutions:
| MF | 11 | Javier Aquino | | (substituted on) 46' |
| MF | 8 | Marco Fabián | (yellow card) 54' | (substituted on) 52' |
| FW | 20 | Eduardo Herrera | (yellow card) 86' | (substituted on) 62' |
Manager:
| Miguel Herrera | | | | (red card) 70' |

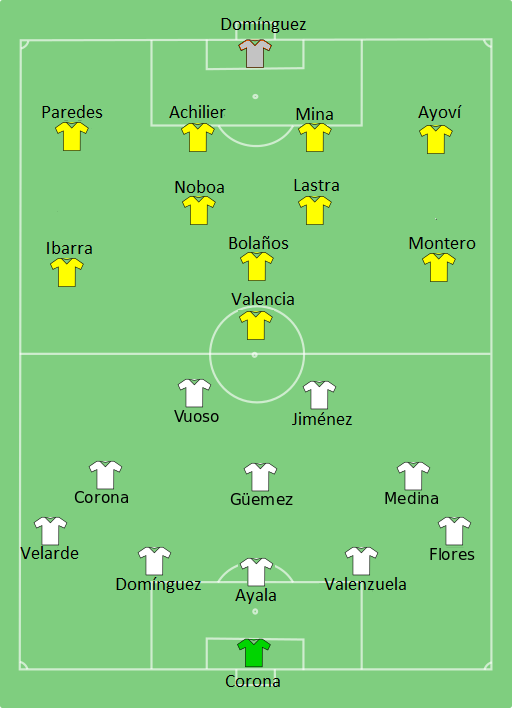

| GK | 23 | Alexander Domínguez |
| RB | 4 | Juan Carlos Paredes |
| CB | 21 | Gabriel Achilier |
| CB | 2 | Arturo Mina |
| LB | 10 | Walter Ayoví (c) |
| CM | 6 | Christian Noboa |
| CM | 14 | Osbaldo Lastra | (yellow card) 90+1' |
| RM | 5 | Renato Ibarra | (yellow card) 52' | (substituted off) 78' |
| AM | 8 | Miller Bolaños | (yellow card) 28' |
| LM | 7 | Jefferson Montero | | (substituted off) 90+2' |
| CF | 13 | Enner Valencia |
Substitutions:
| MF | 11 | Juan Cazares | | (substituted on) 78' |
| FW | 9 | Fidel Martínez | | (substituted on) 90+2' |
Manager:
(Bolivia) Gustavo Quinteros

Man of the Match:
Miller Bolaños (Ecuador)

Assistant referees:
Jorge Urrego (Venezuela)
Cristian De La Cruz (Colombia)
Fourth official:
Enrique Cáceres (Paraguay)
Fifth official:
Carlos Cáceres (Paraguay)

=== Chile vs Bolivia ===
19 June 2015
20:30

| Chile | 5–0 | Bolivia |
|---|---|---|
| Aránguiz 2', 65'; Sánchez 36'; Medel 78'; Raldes 85' (o.g.) | Report |

Estadio Nacional, Santiago
Attendance: 45,601
Referee: Andrés Cunha (Uruguay)

| Chile | Bolivia |

| GK | 1 | Claudio Bravo (c) |
| RB | 4 | Mauricio Isla |
| CB | 17 | Gary Medel |
| CB | 18 | Gonzalo Jara | (substituted off) 70' |
| LB | 15 | Jean Beausejour |
| RM | 20 | Charles Aránguiz |
| CM | 21 | Marcelo Díaz |
| LM | 8 | Arturo Vidal | (substituted off) 46' |
| AM | 10 | Jorge Valdivia |
| CF | 11 | Eduardo Vargas |
| CF | 7 | Alexis Sánchez | (substituted off) 46' |
Substitutions:
| FW | 22 | Ángelo Henríquez | (substituted on) 46' |
| MF | 14 | Matías Fernández | (substituted on) 46' |
| MF | 16 | David Pizarro | (substituted on) 70' |
Manager:
(Argentina) Jorge Sampaoli

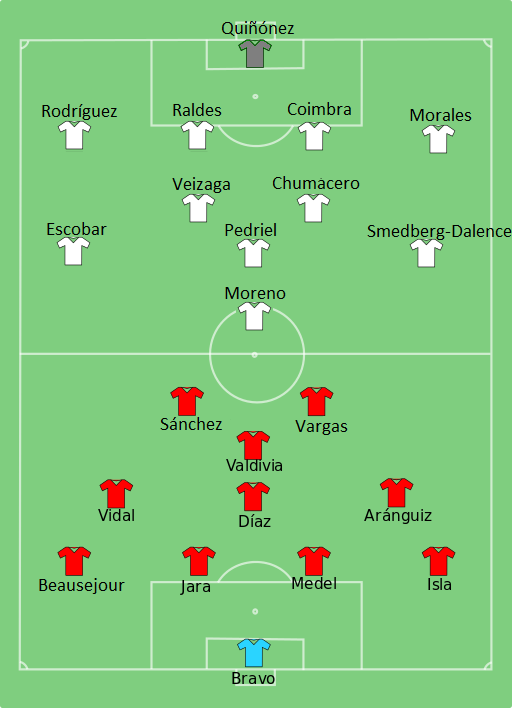

| GK | 1 | Romel Quiñónez |
| RB | 14 | Edemir Rodríguez | | (substituted off) 46' |
| CB | 16 | Ronald Raldes (c) |
| CB | 21 | Cristian Coimbra | (yellow card) 63' |
| LB | 4 | Leonel Morales | (yellow card) 41' |
| RM | 8 | Martin Smedberg-Dalence |
| CM | 19 | Wálter Veizaga | | (substituted off) 46' |
| CM | 3 | Alejandro Chumacero | (yellow card) 72' |
| LM | 18 | Ricardo Pedriel |
| AM | 10 | Pablo Escobar | | (substituted off) 61' |
| CF | 9 | Marcelo Moreno |
Substitutions:
| DF | 17 | Marvin Bejarano | | (substituted on) 46' |
| MF | 13 | Damir Miranda | | (substituted on) 46' |
| MF | 11 | Damián Lizio | | (substituted on) 61' |
Manager:
Mauricio Soria

Man of the Match:
Jorge Valdivia (Chile)

Assistant referees:
Mauricio Espinosa (Uruguay)
Carlos Pastorino (Uruguay)
Fourth official:
Sandro Ricci (Brazil)
Fifth official:
Fabio Pereira (Brazil)
