= 2015 in Chilean football =

Football in Chile
- Season: 2015

This article covers the 2015 football season in Chile.

== National tournaments ==
=== Primera División ===
- Clausura Champion: Cobresal
  - Topscorer: Esteban Paredes & Jean Paul Pineda
- Apertura Champion: Colo-Colo
  - Topscorer: Marcos Riquelme

=== Copa Chile ===
- Champion: Universidad de Concepción
  - Topscorer: Carlos González Espínola
- Champion: Club Universidad de Chile
  - Topscorer: Esteban Paredes & Felipe Mora & Juan Muriel Orlando

== National team results ==
The Chile national football team results and fixtures for 2015.

Win Draw Loss

=== 2015 ===
January 28 Friendly	Chile	3–2	United States	Rancagua, Chile
20:00 (UTC−3)	Gutiérrez 10'; M. González 66', 75'	Report	Shea 6'; Altidore 31'	Stadium: Estadio El Teniente; Attendance: 13,000; Referee: Patricio Loustau (Argentina)

March 26 Friendly	Iran	2–0	Chile	Sankt Pölten, Austria
20:00 (UTC+1)	Nekounam 21'; Amiri 49'	Report		Stadium: NV Arena; Attendance: 2,000; Referee: Manuel Schüttengruber (Austria)

March 29 Friendly	Brazil	1–0	Chile	London, England
15:00 (UTC+1)	Firmino 71'	Report		Stadium: Emirates Stadium; Attendance: 60,000; Referee: Martin Atkinson (England)

June 5 Friendly	Chile	1–0	El Salvador	Rancagua, Chile
19:00 (UTC−3)	Valdivia 10'	Report		Stadium: Estadio El Teniente; Attendance: 14,000; Referee: Fernando Rapallini (Argentina)

June 11 2015 Copa América	Chile	2–0	Ecuador	Santiago, Chile
20:30 (UTC−3)	Vidal 66' (pen.); Vargas 83'	Report (Conmebol); Report (Soccerway)		Stadium: Estadio Nacional Julio Martínez Prádanos; Attendance: 46,000; Referee: Néstor Pitana (Argentina)

June 15 2015 Copa América	Chile	3–3	Mexico	Santiago, Chile
20:30 (UTC−3)	Vidal 21', 54' (pen.); Vargas 41'	Report (Conmebol); Report (Soccerway)	Vuoso 20', 65'; Jiménez 28'	Stadium: Estadio Nacional Julio Martínez Prádanos; Attendance: 45,583; Referee: Víctor Hugo Carrillo (Peru)

June 19 2015 Copa América	Chile	5–0	Bolivia	Santiago, Chile
20:30 (UTC−3)	Aránguiz 2', 65'; A. Sánchez 36'; G. Medel 78'; Raldes 85' (o.g.)	Report (Conmebol); Report (Soccerway)		Stadium: Estadio Nacional Julio Martínez Prádanos; Attendance: 45,601; Referee: Andrés Cunha (Uruguay)

June 24 2015 Copa América	Chile	1–0	Uruguay	Santiago, Chile
20:30 (UTC−3)	Isla 82'	Report (Conmebol); Report (Soccerway)		Stadium: Estadio Nacional Julio Martínez Prádanos; Attendance: 45,304; Referee: Sandro Ricci (Brazil)

June 29 2015 Copa América	Chile	2–1	Peru	Santiago, Chile
20:30 (UTC−3)	Vargas 41', 63'	Report (Conmebol); Report (Soccerway)	G. Medel 60' (o.g.)	Stadium: Estadio Nacional Julio Martínez Prádanos; Attendance: 45,651; Referee: José Argote (Venezuela)

July 4 2015 Copa América	Chile	0–0 (a.e.t.) (4–1 p)	Argentina	Santiago, Chile
17:00 (UTC−3)		Report (Conmebol); Report (Soccerway)		Stadium: Estadio Nacional Julio Martínez Prádanos; Attendance: 45,693; Referee: Wilmar Roldán (Colombia)
	Penalties
	Fernández (penalty scored); Vidal (penalty scored); Aránguiz (penalty scored); A. Sánchez (penalty scored)		(penalty scored) Messi; (penalty missed) Higuaín; (penalty missed) Banega

September 5 Friendly	Chile	3–2	Paraguay	Santiago, Chile
18:00 (UTC−3)	Gutiérrez 8', 64'; Sánchez 82'	Report	Fabbro 51'; Benítez 53'	Stadium: Estadio Nacional Julio Martínez Prádanos; Attendance: 25,000; Referee: Mauro Vigliano (Argentina)

October 8 2018 FIFA World Cup Q	Chile	2–0	Brazil	Santiago, Chile
20:30 (UTC−3)	Vargas 72'; A. Sánchez 88'			Stadium: Estadio Nacional Julio Martínez Prádanos; Attendance: 42,150; Referee: Roddy Zambrano (Ecuador)

October 13 2018 FIFA World Cup Q	Peru	3–4	Chile	Lima, Peru
21:15 (UTC−5)	Farfán 10', 36' (pen.); Guerrero 90+2'		Sánchez 7', 44'; Vargas 41', 49'	Stadium: Estadio Nacional de Lima; Referee: Néstor Pitana (Argentina)

November 12 2018 FIFA World Cup Q	Chile	1–1	Colombia	Santiago, Chile
20:30 UTC−3	Vidal 45'		Rodríguez 68'	Stadium: Estadio Nacional Julio Martínez Prádanos; Attendance: 44,000; Referee: Enrique Cáceres (Paraguay)

November 17 2018 FIFA World Cup Q	Uruguay	3–0	Chile	Montevideo, Uruguay
20:00 UTC−3	Godín 23'; A. Pereira 61'; Cáceres 65'	Report (FIFA)		Stadium: Estadio Centenario; Attendance: 65,000; Referee: Wilmar Roldán (Colombia)

== Record ==
Competition	GP	W	D	L	GF	GA
International Friendly	5	3	0	2	7	7
2015 Copa América	6	4	2	0	13	4
2018 FIFA World Cup qualification	4	2	1	1	7	7
Total	15	9	3	3	27	18

== Goal scorers ==
Player	Goals
Eduardo Vargas	7
Alexis Sánchez	3
Pablo Hernández	3
Jorge Valdivia	2
Charles Aránguiz	2
Rodrigo Millar	1
Arturo Vidal	1
Gary Medel	1
Juan Delgado	1
Jean Beausejour	1
Mauricio Pinilla	1
Marcelo Díaz	1
Carlos Muñoz	1
Miiko Albornoz	1
