= 2015 Copa América Group B =

Group B of the 2015 Copa América was one of the three groups of competing nations in the 2015 Copa América. It consisted of Argentina, Uruguay (title holders), Paraguay, and guests Jamaica of CONCACAF. Group play began on 13 June 2015 and ended on 20 June 2015.

Argentina, Paraguay and Uruguay advanced to the quarter-finals.

== Teams ==
Draw position	Team	Appearance	Previous best performance	FIFA Rankings	
Draw position	Team	Appearance	Previous best performance	October 2014 (Note: The rankings of October 2014 were used for seeding for the draw.)	Start of event
B1	Argentina	40th	Winners (1921, 1925, 1927, 1929, 1937, 1941, 1945, 1946, 1947, 1955, 1957, 1959 (A), 1991, 1993)	2	3
B2	Uruguay	42nd	Winners (1916, 1917, 1920, 1923, 1924, 1926, 1935, 1942, 1956, 1959 (E), 1967, 1983, 1987, 1995, 2011)	8	8
B3	Paraguay	35th	Winners (1953, 1979)	76	85
B4	Jamaica	1st	Debut	113	65

== Standings ==
Pos	Team	Pld	W	D	L	GF	GA	GD	Pts	Qualification
1	Argentina	3	2	1	0	4	2	+2	7	Advance to knockout stage
2	Paraguay	3	1	2	0	4	3	+1	5	Advance to knockout stage
3	Uruguay	3	1	1	1	2	2	0	4	Advance to knockout stage
4	Jamaica	3	0	0	3	0	3	−3	0	

Source: CONMEBOL
Rules for classification: Tie-breaking criteria

In the quarter-finals:

- Argentina advanced to play Colombia (third-placed team of Group C).
- Paraguay advanced to play Brazil (winners of Group C).
- Uruguay (as one of the two best third-placed teams) advanced to play Chile (winners of Group A).

== Matches ==
All times local, CLT (UTC−3).

=== Uruguay vs Jamaica ===
13 June 2015
16:00

Uruguay	1–0	Jamaica
C. Rodríguez 51'	Report

Estadio Regional de Antofagasta, Antofagasta
Attendance: 8,653
Referee: José Argote (Venezuela)

Uruguay	Jamaica

GK	1	Fernando Muslera
RB	16	Maxi Pereira
CB	2	José Giménez	(yellow card) 58'
CB	3	Diego Godín (c)	(yellow card) 83'
LB	6	Álvaro Pereira
DM	17	Egidio Arévalo
RM	5	Carlos Sánchez		(substituted off) 72'
AM	14	Nicolás Lodeiro		(substituted off) 85'
LM	7	Cristian Rodríguez		(substituted off) 63'
CF	9	Diego Rolán
CF	21	Edinson Cavani
Substitutions:
MF	10	Giorgian De Arrascaeta		(substituted in) 63'
FW	11	Christian Stuani		(substituted in) 72'
MF	20	Álvaro González		(substituted in) 85'
Manager:
Óscar Tabárez

GK	1	Duwayne Kerr
RB	19	Adrian Mariappa
CB	3	Michael Hector
CB	4	Wes Morgan
LB	20	Kemar Lawrence
RM	22	Garath McCleary
CM	17	Rodolph Austin (c)
CM	10	Jobi McAnuff	(yellow card) 31'
LM	18	Simon Dawkins		(substituted off) 53'
CF	9	Giles Barnes
CF	11	Darren Mattocks		(substituted off) 74'
Substitutions:
MF	5	Lance Laing		(substituted in) 53'
FW	6	Deshorn Brown		(substituted in) 74'
Manager:
(Germany) Winfried Schäfer

Man of the Match:
Cristian Rodríguez (Uruguay)

Assistant referees:
Jorge Urrego (Venezuela)
Jairo Romero (Venezuela)
Fourth official:
Jorge Osorio (Chile)
Fifth official:
Javier Bustillos (Bolivia)

=== Argentina vs Paraguay ===
13 June 2015
18:30

Argentina	2–2	Paraguay
Agüero 28'; Messi 35' (pen.)	Report	N. Valdez 59'; Barrios 89'

Estadio La Portada, La Serena
Attendance: 16,281
Referee: Wilmar Roldán (Colombia)

Argentina	Paraguay

GK	1	Sergio Romero
RB	3	Facundo Roncaglia	(yellow card) 40'
CB	2	Ezequiel Garay
CB	17	Nicolás Otamendi	(yellow card) 82'
LB	16	Marcos Rojo
CM	14	Javier Mascherano
CM	19	Éver Banega		(substituted off) 80'
AM	21	Javier Pastore		(substituted off) 74'
RW	10	Lionel Messi (c)
CF	11	Sergio Agüero		(substituted off) 74'
LW	7	Ángel Di María
Substitutions:
FW	18	Carlos Tevez		(substituted in) 74'
FW	9	Gonzalo Higuaín		(substituted in) 74'
MF	6	Lucas Biglia		(substituted in) 80'
Manager:
Gerardo Martino

GK	12	Antony Silva
RB	3	Marcos Cáceres
CB	14	Paulo da Silva
CB	4	Pablo Aguilar	(yellow card) 24'
LB	6	Miguel Samudio
RM	18	Nelson Valdez
CM	20	Néstor Ortigoza
CM	15	Víctor Cáceres
LM	13	Richard Ortiz	(yellow card) 38'	(substituted off) 46'
CF	7	Raúl Bobadilla		(substituted off) 65'
CF	9	Roque Santa Cruz (c)		(substituted off) 78'
Substitutions:
FW	10	Derlis González	(yellow card) 47'	(substituted in) 46'
FW	11	Édgar Benítez		(substituted in) 65'
FW	8	Lucas Barrios	(yellow card) 89'	(substituted in) 78'
Manager:
(Argentina) Ramón Díaz

Man of the Match:
Lionel Messi (Argentina) was initially named the Man of the Match, but didn't accept the title.
Therefore, Nelson Valdez (Paraguay) was named as the Man of the Match.

Assistant referees:
Alexander Guzmán (Colombia)
Cristian De La Cruz (Colombia)
Fourth official:
Julio Bascuñán (Chile)
Fifth official:
Raúl Orellana (Chile)

=== Paraguay vs Jamaica ===
16 June 2015
18:00

Paraguay	1–0	Jamaica
Benítez 35'	Report

Estadio Regional de Antofagasta, Antofagasta
Attendance: 6,099
Referee: Carlos Vera (Ecuador)

Paraguay	Jamaica

GK	12	Antony Silva
RB	5	Bruno Valdez	(yellow card) 59'
CB	14	Paulo da Silva
CB	4	Pablo Aguilar
LB	6	Miguel Samudio		(substituted off) 77'
RM	10	Derlis González
CM	20	Néstor Ortigoza
CM	15	Víctor Cáceres
LM	11	Édgar Benítez		(substituted off) 86'
CF	7	Raúl Bobadilla		(substituted off) 75'
CF	9	Roque Santa Cruz (c)
Substitutions:
FW	18	Nelson Valdez		(substituted in) 75'
DF	2	Iván Piris		(substituted in) 77'
MF	16	Osmar Molinas		(substituted in) 86'
Manager:
(Argentina) Ramón Díaz

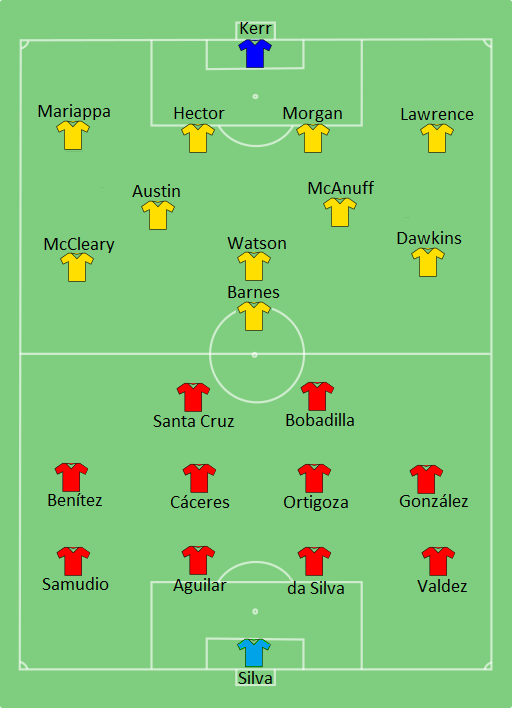

GK	1	Duwayne Kerr
RB	19	Adrian Mariappa
CB	3	Michael Hector
CB	4	Wes Morgan	(yellow card) 16'
LB	20	Kemar Lawrence
CM	17	Rodolph Austin (c)	(yellow card) 8'
CM	10	Jobi McAnuff
RM	22	Garath McCleary
AM	15	Je-Vaughn Watson		(substituted off) 57'
LM	18	Simon Dawkins		(substituted off) 80'
CF	9	Giles Barnes		(substituted off) 62'
Substitutions:
MF	5	Lance Laing		(substituted in) 57'
FW	6	Deshorn Brown		(substituted in) 62'
FW	11	Darren Mattocks		(substituted in) 80'
Manager:
(Germany) Winfried Schäfer

Man of the Match:
Roque Santa Cruz (Paraguay)

Assistant referees:
Christian Lescano (Ecuador)
Byron Romero (Ecuador)
Fourth official:
Jorge Osorio (Chile)
Fifth official:
Jorge Urrego (Venezuela)

=== Argentina vs Uruguay ===
16 June 2015
20:30

Argentina	1–0	Uruguay
Agüero 55'	Report

Estadio La Portada, La Serena
Attendance: 17,014
Referee: Sandro Ricci (Brazil)

Argentina	Uruguay

GK	1	Sergio Romero	(yellow card) 84'
RB	4	Pablo Zabaleta
CB	2	Ezequiel Garay
CB	17	Nicolás Otamendi
LB	16	Marcos Rojo	(yellow card) 71'
RM	6	Lucas Biglia
CM	14	Javier Mascherano	(yellow card) 45+1'
LM	21	Javier Pastore		(substituted off) 79'
RW	10	Lionel Messi (c)
CF	11	Sergio Agüero		(substituted off) 82'
LW	7	Ángel Di María		(substituted off) 89'
Substitutions:
MF	19	Éver Banega		(substituted in) 79'
FW	18	Carlos Tevez		(substituted in) 82'
MF	8	Roberto Pereyra		(substituted in) 89'
Manager:
Gerardo Martino				(red card) 31'

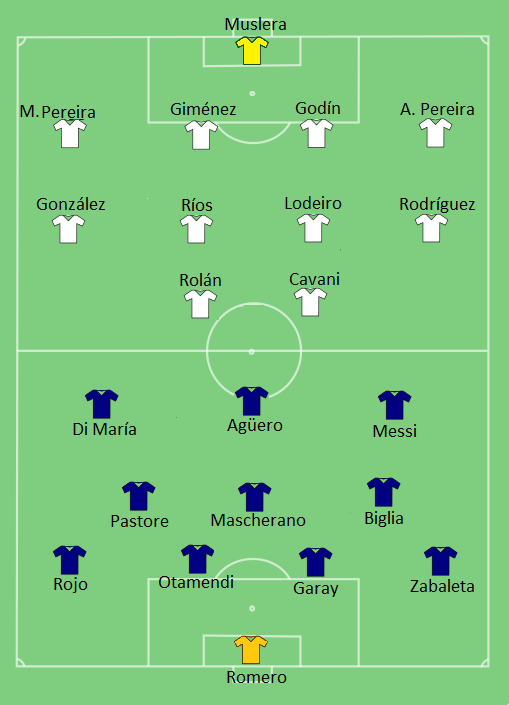

GK	1	Fernando Muslera
RB	16	Maxi Pereira
CB	2	José Giménez
CB	3	Diego Godín (c)	(yellow card) 65'
LB	6	Álvaro Pereira	(yellow card) 86'
RM	20	Álvaro González
CM	17	Egidio Arévalo
CM	14	Nicolás Lodeiro	(yellow card) 31'	(substituted off) 70'
LM	7	Cristian Rodríguez		(substituted off) 64'
CF	9	Diego Rolán
CF	21	Edinson Cavani
Substitutions:
MF	5	Carlos Sánchez		(substituted in) 64'
FW	8	Abel Hernández		(substituted in) 70'
Manager:
Óscar Tabárez

Man of the Match:
Lionel Messi (Argentina)

Assistant referees:
Emerson De Carvalho (Brazil)
Fabio Pereira (Brazil)
Fourth official:
Julio Bascuñán (Chile)
Fifth official:
Raúl Orellana (Chile)

=== Uruguay vs Paraguay ===
20 June 2015
16:00

Uruguay	1–1	Paraguay
Giménez 28'	Report	Barrios 44'

Estadio La Portada, La Serena
Attendance: 16,021
Referee: Roberto García (Mexico)

Uruguay	Paraguay

GK	1	Fernando Muslera
RB	16	Maxi Pereira (c)
CB	2	José Giménez
CB	19	Sebastián Coates	(yellow card) 72'
LB	6	Álvaro Pereira	(yellow card) 74'
RM	20	Álvaro González
CM	17	Egidio Arévalo
LM	5	Carlos Sánchez		(substituted off) 67'
RW	21	Edinson Cavani
CF	8	Abel Hernández	(yellow card) 5'	(substituted off) 46'
LW	9	Diego Rolán
Substitutions:
FW	11	Christian Stuani		(substituted in) 46'
MF	7	Cristian Rodríguez		(substituted in) 67'
Manager:
Óscar Tabárez

GK	1	Justo Villar (c)
RB	3	Marcos Cáceres
CB	14	Paulo da Silva
CB	5	Bruno Valdez
LB	2	Iván Piris
RM	7	Raúl Bobadilla		(substituted off) 67'
CM	16	Osmar Molinas	(yellow card) 81'
CM	20	Néstor Ortigoza	(yellow card) 9'	(substituted off) 64'
LM	11	Édgar Benítez
CF	18	Nelson Valdez
CF	8	Lucas Barrios		(substituted off) 71'
Substitutions:
MF	13	Richard Ortiz	(yellow card) 69'	(substituted in) 64'
FW	10	Derlis González		(substituted in) 67'
FW	9	Roque Santa Cruz		(substituted in) 71'
Manager:
(Argentina) Ramón Díaz

Man of the Match:
Lucas Barrios (Paraguay)

Assistant referees:
José Luis Camargo (Mexico)
Marvin Torrentera (Mexico)
Fourth official:
Enrique Osses (Chile)
Fifth official:
Raúl Orellana (Chile)

=== Argentina vs Jamaica ===
20 June 2015
18:30

Argentina	1–0	Jamaica
Higuaín 10'	Report

Estadio Sausalito, Viña del Mar
Attendance: 21,083
Referee: Julio Bascuñán (Chile)

Argentina	Jamaica

GK	1	Sergio Romero
RB	4	Pablo Zabaleta	(yellow card) 90+2'
CB	2	Ezequiel Garay
CB	15	Martín Demichelis
LB	16	Marcos Rojo
RM	6	Lucas Biglia
CM	14	Javier Mascherano
LM	21	Javier Pastore	(yellow card) 45'	(substituted off) 59'
RW	10	Lionel Messi (c)
CF	9	Gonzalo Higuaín		(substituted off) 72'
LW	7	Ángel Di María		(substituted off) 84'
Substitutions:
MF	8	Roberto Pereyra		(substituted in) 59'
FW	18	Carlos Tevez		(substituted in) 72'
MF	20	Erik Lamela		(substituted in) 84'
Manager:
Gerardo Martino

GK	12	Dwayne Miller
RB	19	Adrian Mariappa
CB	3	Michael Hector	(yellow card) 52'	(substituted off) 71'
CB	4	Wes Morgan
LB	20	Kemar Lawrence
CM	17	Rodolph Austin (c)	(yellow card) 52'
CM	15	Jevaughn Watson	(yellow card) 31'
RM	22	Garath McCleary
AM	10	Jobi McAnuff
LM	5	Lance Laing		(substituted off) 72'
CF	6	Deshorn Brown		(substituted off) 78'
Substitutions:
DF	21	Jermaine Taylor		(substituted in) 71'
FW	18	Simon Dawkins		(substituted in) 72'
FW	9	Giles Barnes		(substituted in) 78'
Manager:
(Germany) Winfried Schäfer

Man of the Match:
Ángel Di María (Argentina)

Assistant referees:
Carlos Astroza (Chile)
Marcelo Barraza (Chile)
Fourth official:
Raúl Orosco (Bolivia)
Fifth official:
Javier Bustillos (Bolivia)
