= Estadio La Portada =

Multi-use stadium in La Serena, Chile

La Portada Stadium
- Estadio La Portada
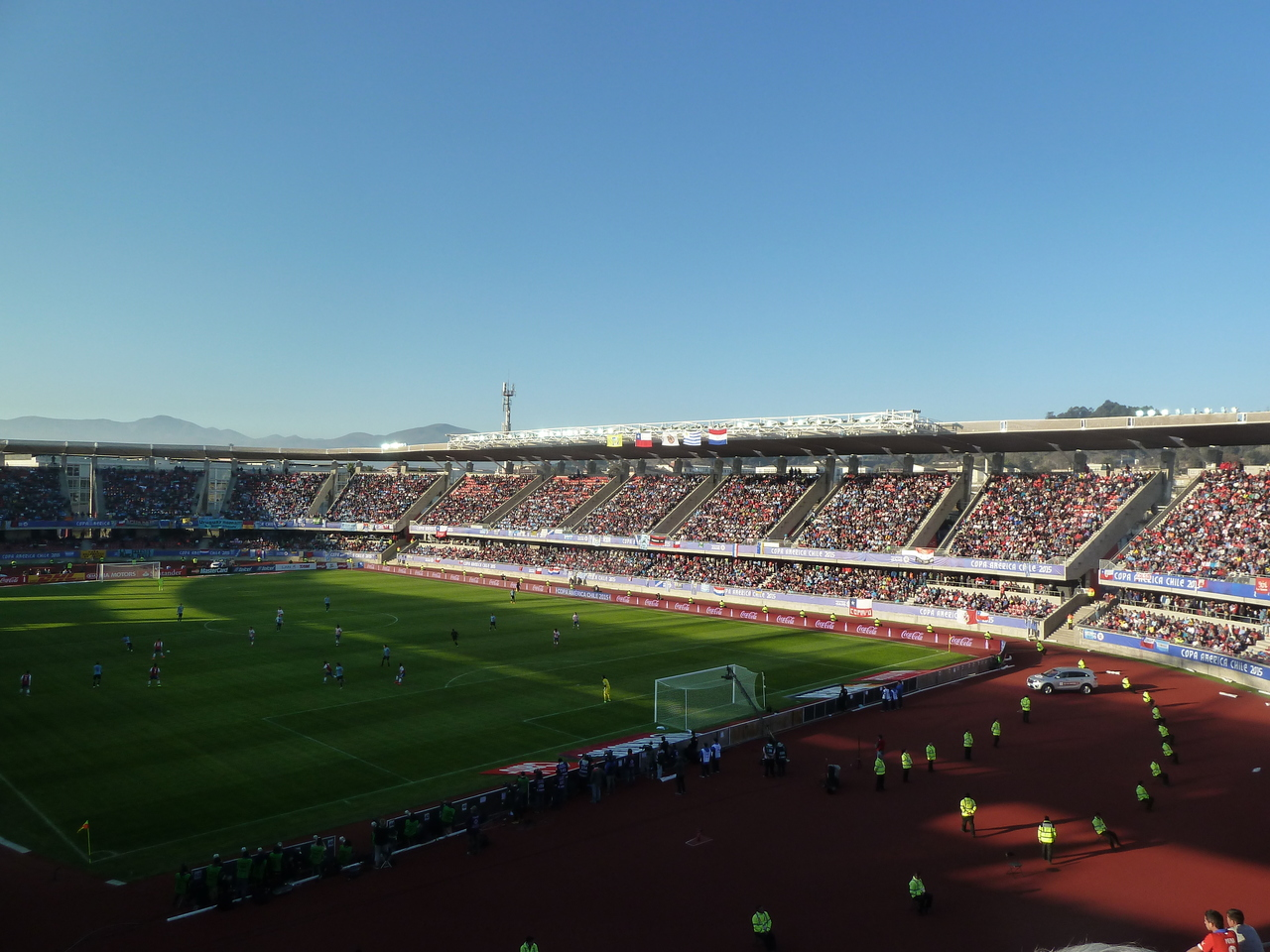
- The stadium in 2015
- Interactive map of La Portada Stadium
- Address: Avenida Estadio 1440; La Serena; Chile
- Coordinates: 29°54′40″S 71°15′07″W
- Owner: Municipality of La Serena
- Operator: Municipality of La Serena; Deportes La Serena
- Capacity: 17,134
- Surface: Grass

Construction
- Opened: 26 August 1952
- Reopened: 13 March 2015

Tenant
- Deportes La Serena

Estadio La Portada (Spanish pronunciation: [la poɾˈtaða]) is a multi-use stadium in La Serena, Chile. It is currently used mostly for football matches and is the home stadium of Deportes La Serena. The stadium holds 18,243 people and was completely renovated in 2015, in time for the 2015 Copa America.

It was opened on 26 August 1952, during the Plan Serena (project directed by President Gabriel González Videla) to replace the old field of La Vega. The name "La Portada" is related to the old and large stone doorway that gave access to the city in colonial times, which was located at the intersection of the current Balmaceda and Amunátegui avenues. This access was part of the 18th century fortifications, walls and artillery pieces that protected La Serena along the entire axis of current Amunátegui Avenue.

The stadium is owned and operated by the and has also hosted other non-sports events such as La Serena Song Festival.

== History ==
The stadium was opened on 26 August 1952. In the first years the field surface was dirt. This changed when Club de Deportes La Serena became professional in 1955 and grass was planted. Since its inauguration, the La Serena combined team played there. In the beginning, demountable grandstands were added to increase the stadium capacity. It was mounted on the running track, allowing to host over 17,000 spectators.

== Sporting events ==
=== 2015 Copa América ===
Date	Time (UTC−3)	Team 1	Res.	Team 2	Round	Attend.
13 June	18:30	Argentina	2–2	Paraguay	Group B	16,281
16 June	20:30	Argentina	1–0	Uruguay	Group B	17,014
20 June	16:00	Uruguay	1–1	Paraguay	Group B	16,021

=== 2015 U-17 FIFA World Cup ===
Date	Team 1	Res.	Team 2	Round	Attend.
20 Oct	England	0–1	Brazil	Group B	8,225
20 Oct	South Korea	1–0	Guinea	Group B	8,225
28 Oct	South Korea	0–2	Belgium	Round of 16	6,388
5 Nov	Mali	3–1	Belgium	Semi-finals	6,395

Preceded by (various venues) in Argentina	Copa América Venue; 2015	Succeeded by (various venues) in the United States
Preceded by (various venues) in the UAE	FIFA U-17 World Cup Venue; 2015	Succeeded by (various venues) in the India
Preceded by Estadio Rodrigo Paz Delgado; Quito	U-20 Copa Libertadores; Final Venue; 2023	Succeeded by TBD
