= Martin Smedberg-Dalence =

Swedish-born Bolivian footballer (born 1984)

Personal information
- Full name: Martin Ramiro Guillermo; Smedberg-Dalence
- Date of birth: 10 May 1984 (age 42)
- Place of birth: Norrköping, Sweden
- Height: 1.87 m (6 ft 2 in)
- Positions: Right midfielder; right back

Youth career
- –2000: Gunnilse IS

Senior career*
Years	Team	Apps	(Gls)
2001–2003	Gunnilse IS	50	(13)
2004–2006	IFK Göteborg	6	(0)
2005	→ Västra Frölunda IF (loan)	15	(1)
2006	→ Ljungskile SK (loan)	30	(10)
2007–2010	Ljungskile SK	113	(17)
2011–2013	IFK Norrköping	89	(6)
2014–2017	IFK Göteborg	80	(5)
2018	Bolívar	15	(1)
2019	Always Ready	27	(1)
2020–2021	Utsiktens BK	38	(1)

International career
1999–2001	Sweden U17	14	(0)
2002–2003	Sweden U19	13	(0)
2014–2016	Bolivia	13	(1)
- * Club domestic league appearances and goals

Martin Smedberg-Dalence (Spanish pronunciation: [ˈmaɾtin esˈmeðβeɾɣ ðaˈlense], Swedish: [ˈmǎʈːɪn ˈsmêːdbærj daˈlɛ̌nːsɛ]; born 10 May 1984) is a former professional footballer who played as a right midfielder. Born in Sweden, he played for the Bolivia national team between 2014 and 2016, winning 13 caps and scoring one goal.

== International career ==
Dalence has represented Sweden at youth levels. In 2013, he said his dream is to play for the Bolivian senior team.

On 3 October 2014 he officially received his first call-up to the Bolivia national football team.

Dalence was included in the Bolivian squad for the 2015 Copa América in Chile by manager Mauricio Soria. On 15 June, he scored his first international goal in the team's second group match – a 3–2 defeat of Ecuador – to give La Verde its first win at the Copa América since the 1997 tournament.

== Personal life ==
Although born in Norrköping, his family moved to Gothenburg when he was very young and he was subsequently raised there. His father, Ramiro Dalence, is from Oruro, Bolivia, and came to Sweden in 1980. He revealed in an interview in 2013 that he is a fan of Real Madrid, and, like his father, The Strongest.

== Career statistics ==
=== Club ===
As of 13 September 2015

Club	Season	League			Cup		Continental		Total	
Club	Season	Division	Apps	Goals	Apps	Goals	Apps	Goals	Apps	Goals
Gunnilse IS	2001	Division 2	7	0	0	0	—		7	0
Gunnilse IS	2002	Division 2	21	2	0	0	—		21	2
Gunnilse IS	2003	Division 2	22	11	—		—		22	11
Gunnilse IS	Total		50	13	0	0	0	0	50	13
IFK Göteborg	2004	Allsvenskan	0	0	1	0	—		1	0
IFK Göteborg	2005	Allsvenskan	6	0	3	1	2	0	11	1
IFK Göteborg	Total		6	0	4	1	2	0	12	1
Västra Frölunda IF	2005	Superettan	15	1	—		—		15	1
Ljungskile SK	2006	Superettan	30	10	1	0	—		31	10
Ljungskile SK	2007	Superettan	29	2	0	0	—		29	2
Ljungskile SK	2008	Allsvenskan	27	2	2	0	—		29	2
Ljungskile SK	2009	Superettan	30	9	2	1	—		32	10
Ljungskile SK	2010	Superettan	27	4	4	2	—		31	6
Ljungskile SK	Total		143	27	9	3	0	0	152	30
IFK Norrköping	2011	Allsvenskan	30	1	2	1	—		32	2
IFK Norrköping	2012	Allsvenskan	30	2	1	0	—		31	2
IFK Norrköping	2013	Allsvenskan	29	3	5	1	—		34	4
IFK Norrköping	Total		89	6	8	2	0	0	97	8
IFK Göteborg	2014	Allsvenskan	22	2	4	0	4	0	30	2
IFK Göteborg	2015	Allsvenskan	15	0	6	1	4	0	25	1
IFK Göteborg	2016	Allsvenskan	26	3	5	0			31	3
IFK Göteborg	2017	Allsvenskan	16	0	0	0			16	0
IFK Göteborg	Total		79	5	10	1	8	0	97	6
Bolivar	2018		15	1						
Always Ready	2019		27	1						
Utsiktens BK	2020	Ettan Södra	25	1	3	0			28	1
Utsiktens BK	2021	Ettan Södra	10	0	1	0			11	0
Utsiktens BK	Total		35	1	4	0	0	0	39	1
Career total			459	55	40	7	10	0	509	62

=== International ===
As of 7 June 2016

National team	Year	Apps	Goals
Bolivia	2014	1	0
Bolivia	2015	6	1
Bolivia	2016	6	0
Total		13	1

International goals

Scores and results list Bolivia's goal tally first

#	Date	Venue	Opponent	Score	Result	Competition
1.	15 June 2015	Estadio Elías Figueroa, Valparaíso, Chile	Ecuador	2–0	3–2	2015 Copa América

== Honours ==
IFK Göteborg

- Svenska Cupen: 2014–15

Individual

- Årets Ärkeängel: 2016
