= Marcos Cáceres =

Paraguayan footballer (born 1986)

Personal information
- Full name: Marcos Antonio Cáceres
- Date of birth: 5 May 1986 (age 40)
- Place of birth: Asunción, Paraguay
- Height: 1.85 m (6 ft 1 in)
- Positions: Centre-back; right-back

Team information
- Current team: Tacuary
- Number: 5

Senior career*
| Years | Team | Apps | (Gls) |
| 2006–2007 | Cerro Porteño | 22 | (0) |
| 2007–2012 | Racing | 108 | (2) |
| 2012–2016 | Newell's Old Boys | 91 | (7) |
| 2016–2021 | Cerro Porteño | 142 | (7) |
| 2021–2023 | Guaraní | 61 | (8) |
| 2023– | Tacuary | 38 | (2) |

International career^{‡}
| 2007– | Paraguay | 22 | (0) |
- * Club domestic league appearances and goals as of 29 August 2024 ‡ National team caps and goals as of 9 September 2021

Marcos Antonio Cáceres (born 5 May 1986) is a Paraguayan football defender who plays for Tacuary. He has previously played for Cerro Porteño, Guaraní, and in Argentina with Racing and Newell's Old Boys. As an international footballer, Cáceres was included in the squads for the 2011 and 2015 editions of the Copa América.

Cáceres started his playing career in 2006 with Cerro Porteño where he played a total of 24 games in all competitions before joining Racing Club in 2007. After 2 substitute appearances Cáceres quickly established himself as a regular starter in the Racing Club lineup.

== International career ==
Cáceres made his international debut on 22 August 2007 against Venezuela. Cáceres made one appearance in the qualification cycle for the 2010 World Cup, and was not named to the squad for the team that reached the quarter-final. Cáceres did make the squad for the 2011 Copa América, and made one appearance, featuring at right back in the semi-final penalty shootout victory over Venezuela, replacing the suspended Antolín Alcaraz. Paraguay would lose in the final to Uruguay, and Cáceres lost his place in the side to Elvis Marecos.

Cáceres made two appearances in the qualification cycle for the 2014 World Cup, as Paraguay failed to qualify. He made the squad for the 2015 Copa América, featuring in three games at right back, including their opening game, and the third-place playoff defeat to Peru; the other matches were started by Bruno Valdez.

Out of the national team picture for the next six years, Cáceres made a shocking return during Paraguay's World Cup qualifying matches in September of 2021. He wasn't included in the original squad, but after Alberto Espínola left their first match against Ecuador with an injury inside 10 minutes, Cáceres took his place in the squad for the next two matches. Robert Rojas replaced Espínola against Ecuador, and started against Colombia and Venezuela, but left the match against Venezuela with an injury. Cáceres was brought on for the final 10 minutes of the 2–1 victory, and he made his first appearance for the national team in six years and two months.

== Honours ==
Newell's Old Boys

- Primera División: 2013 Final
