= Cristian Coimbra =

Bolivian football central defender (born 1988)

Personal information
- Full name: Cristian Michael Coimbra Arias
- Date of birth: December 31, 1988 (age 37)
- Place of birth: Santa Cruz de la Sierra, Bolivia
- Height: 1.83 m (6 ft 0 in)
- Position: Centre back

Senior career*
Years	Team	Apps	(Gls)
2007–2012	Guabirá	102	(5)
2012–2014	Sport Boys Warnes	28	(0)
2014–2016	Blooming	57	(1)
2016–2017	Sport Boys Warnes	24	(2)
2017–2018	Blooming	39	(1)
2019	Royal Pari	18	(1)
2020	Real Santa Cruz	22	(1)
2021	Wilstermann	6	(0)

International career^{‡}
2015–	Bolivia	4	(0)
- * Club domestic league appearances and goals as of 23:27, 21 December 2020 (UTC) ‡ National team caps and goals as of 27 March 2018

Cristian Michael Coimbra Arias (born December 31, 1988) is a Bolivian football central defender who plays for club Real Santa Cruz in the Bolivian Primera División.

== Club career ==
Coimbra began his football career in 2007 with Guabirá. In 2012, he joined Sport Boys Warnes and helped the club gain promotion to first division the following year. His good form rewarded him with a transfer to Blooming in July 2014.

== International career ==
Coimbra was summoned to the Bolivia national team for the 2015 Copa America. He made his debut on June 15 at Valparaíso's Estadio Elías Figueroa in a 3–2 victory over Ecuador, coming off the bench in the 56th minute replacing Ricardo Pedriel.
