= Sausalito Stadium =

Sports venue in Viña del Mar, Chile

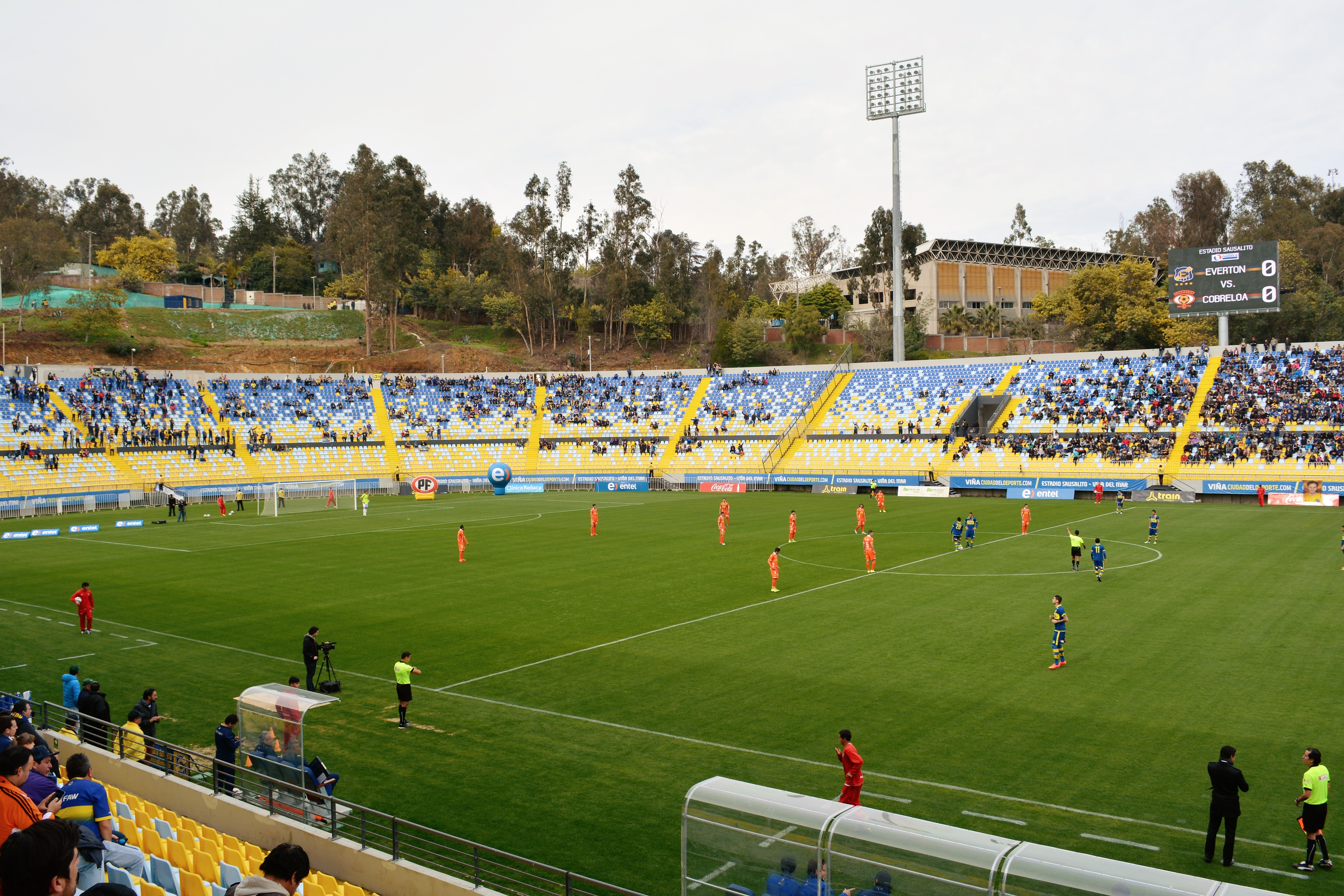
- Interactive map of Sausalito Stadium
- Location: Viña del Mar, Chile
- Coordinates: 33°00′52″S 71°32′06″W
- Owner: Municipality of Viña Del Mar
- Capacity: 23,423; 21,754 (international)
- Field size: 105 x 68 m

Construction
- Built: 1929
- Opened: 8 September 1929
- Reopened: 4 June 2015

Tenant
- Everton

Sausalito Stadium (Spanish: Estadio Sausalito, pronounced [esˈtaðjo sawsaˈlito]) is a multi-purpose stadium in Viña del Mar, Chile.

It is currently used mostly for football matches and is the home ground of CD Everton. The stadium holds 23,423 people, was built in 1929 and completely renovated in 2015. The stadium has hosted the 1962 World Cup, two times the Copa América (1991 and 2015) and a FIFA U-17 World Cup.

The name comes from sister city Sausalito, California, who in turn renamed their main square for Viña del Mar in the 1960s.

== History ==
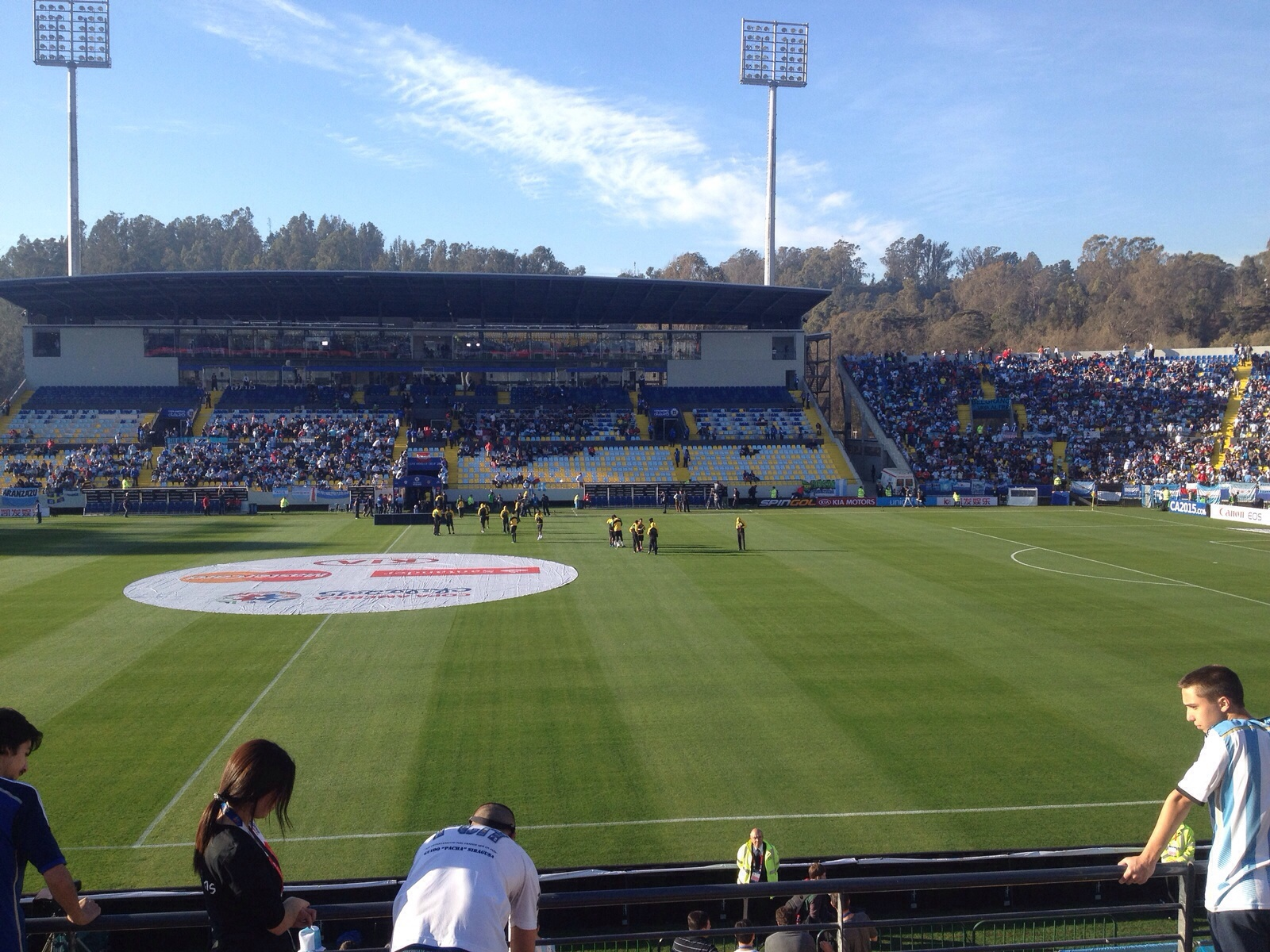
Sausalito Stadium before a 2015 Copa América match between Argentina and Jamaica on 20 June.

It was built during Carlos Ibáñez del Campo's first government in 1929.

In 1960, the stadium was practically destroyed by the Valdivia earthquake, but the rapid reconstruction financed by the municipality ensured that the ground was chosen as one of the venues to hold the 1962 World Cup hosting all the games of the Group C as well as one during the quarterfinals and semifinals respectively.

In 1991, Sausalito returned to international football, after appearing as one of the four venues in the Copa América of that year, alongside Santiago, Valparaíso and Concepción.

In January 2004, a new electronic scoreboard was installed in the stadium as part of the requirements for hosting the Pre-Olympic Tournament of that year.

On 19 July 2012, President of Chile Sebastián Piñera announced a renovation to the stadium to host the 2015 Copa América and the FIFA U-17 World Cup of the same year, which started during his government and finished few days before the Copa América during Michelle Bachelet government.

In July 2022, the venue was confirmed to host the men's football tournament at the 2023 Pan American Games.

In July 2024, it was confirmed as one of the 5 host venues for the 2025 FIFA U-20 World Cup.

== International matches ==
As one of the venues for the 1962 World Cup, the Sausalito Stadium hosted eight matches including the semi-final between Czechoslovakia and Yugoslavia. It was also one of four venues to host matches during the 1991 Copa América, and it was one of the eight venues to host matches during the 2015 Copa América.

=== 1962 FIFA World Cup ===
Date	Time (UTC–4)	Team #1	Res.	Team #2	Round	Attendance
30 May 1962	15:00	Brazil	2–0	Mexico	Group 3	10,484
31 May 1962	15:00	Czechoslovakia	1–0	Spain	Group 3	12,700
2 June 1962	15:00	Brazil	0–0	Czechoslovakia	Group 3	14,903
3 June 1962	15:00	Spain	1–0	Mexico	Group 3	11,875
6 June 1962	15:00	Brazil	2–1	Spain	Group 3	18,715
7 June 1962	15:00	Mexico	3–1	Czechoslovakia	Group 3	10,648
10 June 1962	14:30	Brazil	3–1	England	Quarterfinal	17,736
13 June 1962	14:30	Czechoslovakia	3–1	Yugoslavia	Semifinal	5,890

=== 1991 Copa América ===
Date	Time (UTC–4)	Team #1	Res.	Team #2	Round	Attendance
9 July 1991		Uruguay	1–1	Ecuador	Group B	18,430
9 July 1991		Brazil	2–1	Bolivia	Group B	18,430
11 July 1991		Colombia	0–0	Bolivia	Group B	19,350
11 July 1991		Brazil	1–1	Uruguay	Group B	19,350
13 July 1991		Ecuador	4–0	Bolivia	Group B	17,250
13 July 1991		Colombia	2–0	Brazil	Group B	17,250
15 July 1991		Uruguay	1–0	Colombia	Group B	15,721
15 July 1991		Brazil	3–1	Ecuador	Group B	15,721

=== 2015 Copa América ===
Date	Time (UTC−3)	Team #1	Res.	Team #2	Round	Attendance
12 June 2015	20:30	Mexico	0–0	Bolivia	Group A	14,987
20 June 2015	18:30	Argentina	1–0	Jamaica	Group B	21,083
26 June 2015	20:30	Argentina	0–0 (PSO: 5–4)	Colombia	Quarter-Finals	21,508

=== 2015 FIFA U-17 World Cup ===
Date	Time (UTC–3)	Team #1	Res.	Team #2	Round	Attendance
20 October 2015	17:00	United States	2–2	Croatia	Group A	21,893
20 October 2015	20:00	Chile	1–5	Nigeria	Group A	21,893
23 October 2015	17:00	Guinea	1–3	Brazil	Group B	19.321
23 October 2015	20:00	United States	1–4	Chile	Group A	19.321
28 October 2015	17:00	Brazil	1–0	New Zealand	Round of 16	4,265
28 October 2015	20:00	Nigeria	6–0	Australia	Round of 16	4,265
1 November 2015	16:00	Brazil	0–3	Nigeria	Quarter-finals	5,880
8 November 2015	16:00	Belgium	3–2	Mexico	Third place match	15,235
8 November 2015	19:00	Mali	0–2	Nigeria	Final	15,235

== Concerts ==
21 January 1988	(Argentina) Enanitos Verdes (Argentina) Charly García (Chile) Los Prisioneros	24 Horas de Rock Festival
23 January 1996	(United Kingdom) Page & Plant (United States) The Black Crowes	No Quarter Tour
10 February 1996	(Argentina) Soda Stereo	Sueño Stereo Tour
27-28 January 2000	(Puerto Rico) Chayanne	Atado a tu Amor Tour
16 January 2001	(Argentina) Ráfaga	—
19 January 2001	(Argentina) Los Fabulosos Cadillacs (Chile) Chancho En Piedra	—
3 February 2007	(Argentina) Babasónicos (Mexico) Plastilina Mosh (Puerto Rico) Calle 13	Crush Power Music 2007
1 February 2023	(United States) Backstreet Boys	
30 December 2023	(France) David Guetta	—

Preceded by Mohammed bin Zayed Stadium; Abu Dhabi	FIFA U-17 World Cup; Final venue 2015	Succeeded by Salt Lake Stadium; Kolkata
