= Ronald Raldes =

Bolivian footballer (born 1981)

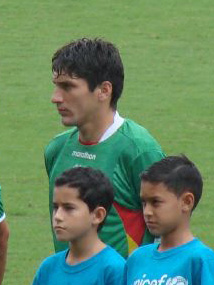
- Raldes in 2007

Personal information
- Full name: Ronald Raldes Balcázar
- Date of birth: April 20, 1981 (age 45)
- Place of birth: Santa Cruz de la Sierra, Bolivia
- Height: 1.79 m (5 ft 10 in)
- Position: Centre-back

Senior career*
Years	Team	Apps	(Gls)
1998–1999	Destroyers	64	(2)
2000–2003	Oriente Petrolero	131	(9)
2004–2008	Rosario Central	136	(3)
2008–2009	Al-Hilal	2	(0)
2009	Cruz Azul	2	(0)
2009–2010	Maccabi Tel Aviv	24	(0)
2010–2013	Colón	72	(0)
2014–2016	Oriente Petrolero	116	(4)
2017–2018	Bolívar	69	(0)
2019	Oriente Petrolero	25	(0)
Total		641	(18)

International career
2001	Bolivia U-20	4	(0)
2001–2018	Bolivia	102	(3)
- * Club domestic league appearances and goals

Ronald Raldes Balcázar (born April 20, 1981) is a Bolivian former professional footballer who played as a centre-back. He is the first Bolivian player in history to reach 100 international appearances.

== Club career ==
Raldes was born in Santa Cruz de la Sierra. He started his career with Club Destroyers in 1998, the following year he joined Oriente Petrolero, where he was part of the Bolivian League Championship winning team in 2001.

Due to his high performance displayed with Oriente Petrolero and the Bolivia national team, Raldes was signed by Argentine club Rosario Central in 2003.

In 2008, and after five great years with the canallas, Raldes announced his imminent departure from the institution once the Torneo Clausura ended in mid June. Not long after, he signed for Saudi Arabian club Al-Hilal. On March 20, 2009, he joined Mexican side Cruz Azul. He made his debut on April 22, 2009, against Atlante, in the first-leg match of the CONCACAF Champions League finals. After only making two appearances for the cementeros, Raldes decided to let go the contract with Cruz Azul and signed with Israeli football club Maccabi Tel Aviv in September 2009. In May 2010, Raldes returned to Argentina and joined Colón de Santa Fe on a two-year deal. On January 25, 2012, while doing the pre-season with Colón, Raldes fractured his left fibula bone during a friendly match against Patronato causing him to miss the entire Clausura tournament.

In November 2013, Raldes left Colón due to the club's failure to pay his wages. He was signed by Oriente Petrolero, on January 9, 2014.

== International career ==
Since Raldes debuted for the Bolivia national team in 2001 he has appeared for the nation at five Copa América tournaments.

On 18 November 2014, he scored his first international goal in a 3–2 friendly home win over Venezuela.

Raldes was captain of the Bolivian squad for the 2015 Copa América in Chile. On 15 June, he scored in the team's second group match – a 3–2 defeat of Ecuador – to give La Verde its first win at the Copa América since the 1997 tournament.

On September 11, 2015, Raldes announced his retirement from the national team, but returned in 2016 after Guillermo Ángel Hoyos replaced Julio César Baldivieso. He represented his country in 44 FIFA World Cup qualification matches.

On May 28, 2018, he reached 100 games with Bolivia, which was defeated 3–0 by the United States in an international friendly.

== Career statistics ==
Scores and results list Bolivia's goal tally first, score column indicates score after each Raldes goal.

List of international goals scored by Ronald Raldes
No.	Date	Venue	Opponent	Score	Result	Competition
1	18 November 2014	Estadio Hernando Siles, La Paz, Bolivia	Venezuela	1–1	3–2	Friendly
2	15 June 2015	Estadio Elías Figueroa Brander, Valparaíso, Chile	Ecuador	1–0	3–2	2015 Copa América
3	1 September 2016	Estadio Hernando Siles, La Paz, Bolivia	Peru	2–0	2–0	2018 FIFA World Cup qualification

== Honours ==
Oriente Petrolero

- Liga de Fútbol Profesional Boliviano: 2001

Bolívar

- Liga de Fútbol Profesional Boliviano: 2017 Apertura, 2017 Clausura

== See also ==
- List of footballers with 100 or more caps
