= Osbaldo Lastra =

Ecuadorian footballer (born 1985)

Osvaldo Lastra
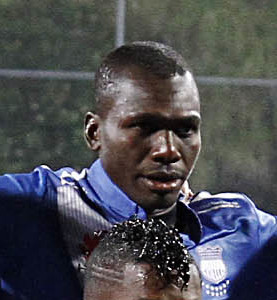

Personal information
- Full name: Osvaldo Lupo Lastra García
- Date of birth: June 12, 1985 (age 41)
- Place of birth: San Lorenzo Canton, Ecuador
- Height: 1.84 m (6 ft 0 in)
- Position: Midfielder

Youth career
- 2000–2005: Audaz Octubrino
- 2004: Deportivo Quito

Senior career*
Years	Team	Apps	(Gls)
2002–2004	Atlético Jubones	7	(0)
2008–2009	Aucas	36	(1)
2010–2011	Deportivo Azogues	26	(5)
2011–2012	Macará	61	(3)
2013–2018	Emelec	161	(6)
2019	Barcelona SC	8	(0)

International career^{‡}
2015	Ecuador	6	(0)
- * Club domestic league appearances and goals as of 23 September 2020 ‡ National team caps and goals as of 19 June 2015

Osvaldo Lupo Lastra García (born 12 June 1985) is an Ecuadorian footballer who plays as a midfielder.

Lastra was called up for the 2015 Copa América making the cut for the final 23 this time around.

== Honors ==
Emelec

- Serie A (4): 2013, 2014, 2015, 2017
