= Miguel Ángel Hurtado =

Bolivian footballer (born 1985)

Personal information
- Full name: Miguel Ángel Hurtado Suárez
- Date of birth: July 4, 1985 (age 41)
- Place of birth: Santa Cruz, Bolivia
- Height: 1.74 m (5 ft 9 in)
- Position: Defender

Senior career*
Years	Team	Apps	(Gls)
2004	Real Santa Cruz	16	(2)
2005	La Paz	18	(0)
2006	Real Potosí	26	(0)
2007	Blooming	21	(0)
2008–2010	La Paz	78	(2)
2011–2013	Nacional Potosí	89	(2)
2013–2014	Real Potosí	39	(2)
2014–2017	Blooming	115	(4)

International career
2014–2015	Bolivia	7	(0)
- * Club domestic league appearances and goals as of 15:44, 19 December 2019 (UTC)

Miguel Angel Hurtado Suarez (born July 4, 1985, in Santa Cruz, Bolivia) is a Bolivian footballer who plays as a defender.

In his career, he has played for four clubs in the Liga de Fútbol Profesional Boliviano. Clubs he played for include La Paz, Nacional Potosí, Real Potosí and his current club Blooming.

== International career ==
Miguel Angel Hurtado has also played for the Bolivia national football team making 3 appearances for them including two friendlies and one appearance in the 2015 Copa America.

== Club career statistics ==
Club performance			League		Cup		League Cup		Total	
Season	Club	League	Apps	Goals	Apps	Goals	Apps	Goals	Apps	Goals
League		Apertura and Clausura			Copa Aerosur		Total			
2005	La Paz	Liga de Fútbol Profesional Boliviano	18	0	-	-	-	-	18	0
2006	Real Potosí	Liga de Fútbol Profesional Boliviano	26	0	-	-	-	-	26	0
2007	Blooming	Liga de Fútbol Profesional Boliviano	21	0	-	-	-	-	21	0
2008	La Paz	Liga de Fútbol Profesional Boliviano	27	1	-	-	-	-	27	1
2009	La Paz	Liga de Fútbol Profesional Boliviano	16	0	-	-	-	-	16	0
2010	La Paz	Liga de Fútbol Profesional Boliviano	35	1	-	-	-	-	36	1
2011	Nacional Potosí	Liga de Fútbol Profesional Boliviano	21	0	-	-	-	-	21	0
2011/12	Nacional Potosí	Liga de Fútbol Profesional Boliviano	27	0	-	-	-	-	21	0
2012/13	Nacional Potosí	Liga de Fútbol Profesional Boliviano	41	2	-	-	-	-	41	2
2013/14	Real Potosí	Liga de Fútbol Profesional Boliviano	39	2	2	0	-	-	41	2
2014/15	Blooming	Liga de Fútbol Profesional Boliviano	32	0	-	-	-	-	32	0
2015/16	Blooming	Liga de Fútbol Profesional Boliviano	4	0	6	0	-	-	10	0
Total			307	6	8	0	-	-	315	0

== Achievements ==
2008 Apertura Runners-up
