= Leonel Morales =

Bolivian footballer (born 1988)

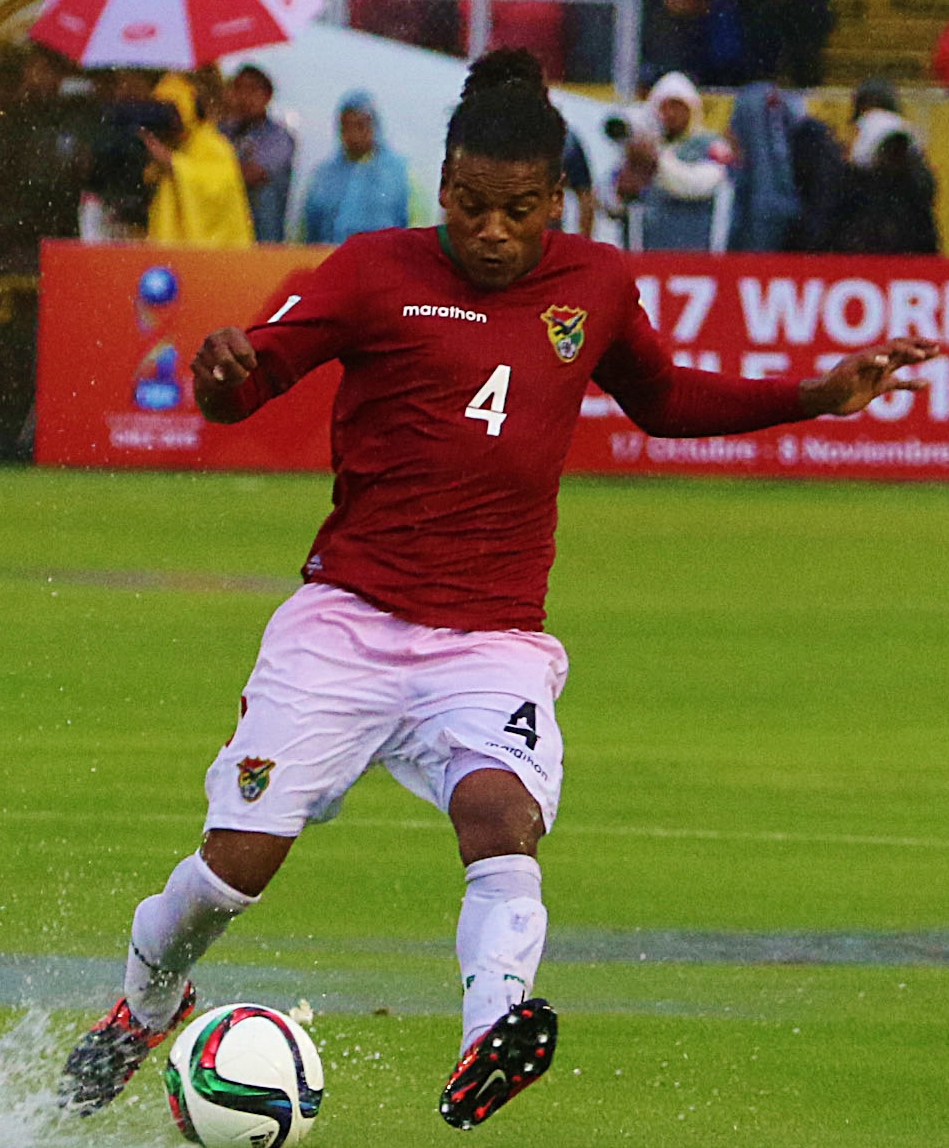
- Leonel Morales in 2015

Personal information
- Full name: Leonel Morales
- Date of birth: 2 September 1988 (age 38)
- Place of birth: Coripata, Bolivia
- Height: 1.69 m (5 ft 6 1/2 in)
- Position: Left-back

Team information
- Current team: Universitario de Sucre

Senior career*
Years	Team	Apps	(Gls)
2007–2012	Universitario de Sucre	55	(0)
2011–2012	→ Sheriff Tiraspol (loan)	15	(0)
2013–2018	Bolívar	79	(4)
2013–2014	→ Real Potosí (loan)	33	(1)
2014–2015	→ Blooming (loan)	33	(0)
2015–2016	→ Sport Boys (loan)	41	(2)
2020–2021	Real Potosí	28	(1)
2022–	Universitario de Sucre	0	(0)

International career^{‡}
2014–	Bolivia	10	(0)
- * Club domestic league appearances and goals as of 8 April 2019 ‡ National team caps and goals as of 24 March 2016

Leonel Morales (born 2 September 1988, Coripata, Bolivia) is a Bolivian football left-back who plays for Real Potosí.

== International career ==
Morales made his debut for Bolivia in an October 2014 friendly match against Chile and has, as of June 2016, earned a total of 10 caps, scoring no goals. He represented his country in 2 FIFA World Cup qualification matches and at the 2015 Copa América.

== Honours ==
- Moldovan National Division: 2011–12
- Bolivian Primera División: 2008 Apertura
