= Romel Quiñónez =

Bolivian footballer (born 1992)

Personal information
- Full name: Romel Javier Quiñónez Suárez
- Date of birth: 25 June 1992 (age 34)
- Place of birth: Santa Cruz de la Sierra, Bolivia
- Height: 1.81 m (5 ft 11 in)
- Position: Goalkeeper

Youth career
- 2005–2010: Bolívar

Senior career*
Years	Team	Apps	(Gls)
2010–2018	Bolívar	160	(0)
2017	→ Oriente Petrolero (loan)	19	(0)
2019–2020	Oriente Petrolero	19	(0)
2021	Club Blooming	0	(0)

International career^{‡}
2013–2019	Bolivia	14	(0)
- * Club domestic league appearances and goals as of 13:42, 23 September 2019 (UTC) ‡ National team caps and goals as of 4 June 2016

Romel Javier Quiñónez Suárez (born 25 June 1992) is a Bolivian former footballer who played as a goalkeeper.

== International career ==
As of June 2016, he has won 13 caps for the Bolivia national football team. He represented his country in 3 FIFA World Cup qualification matches.
