= Raúl Orosco =

Bolivian football referee

Raúl Orosco Delgadillo
- Full name: Raúl Orosco Delgadillo
- Born: 25 March 1979 (age 47); Cochabamba, Bolivia

Domestic
Years	League	Role

International
Years	League	Role
2009–present	FIFA listed	Referee

Raúl Orosco Delgadillo (born 25 March 1979 in Cochabamba) is a Bolivian football referee. He became an International FIFA referee in 2009 and has since been appointed in the Copa Libertadores, Copa Sudamericana, U-15 South American Championships and in the 2014 FIFA World Cup qualification which were held in his native country.

His first senior national teams' competition was the 2011 Copa América in Argentina.
