= Ricardo Pedriel =

Bolivian footballer (born 1987)

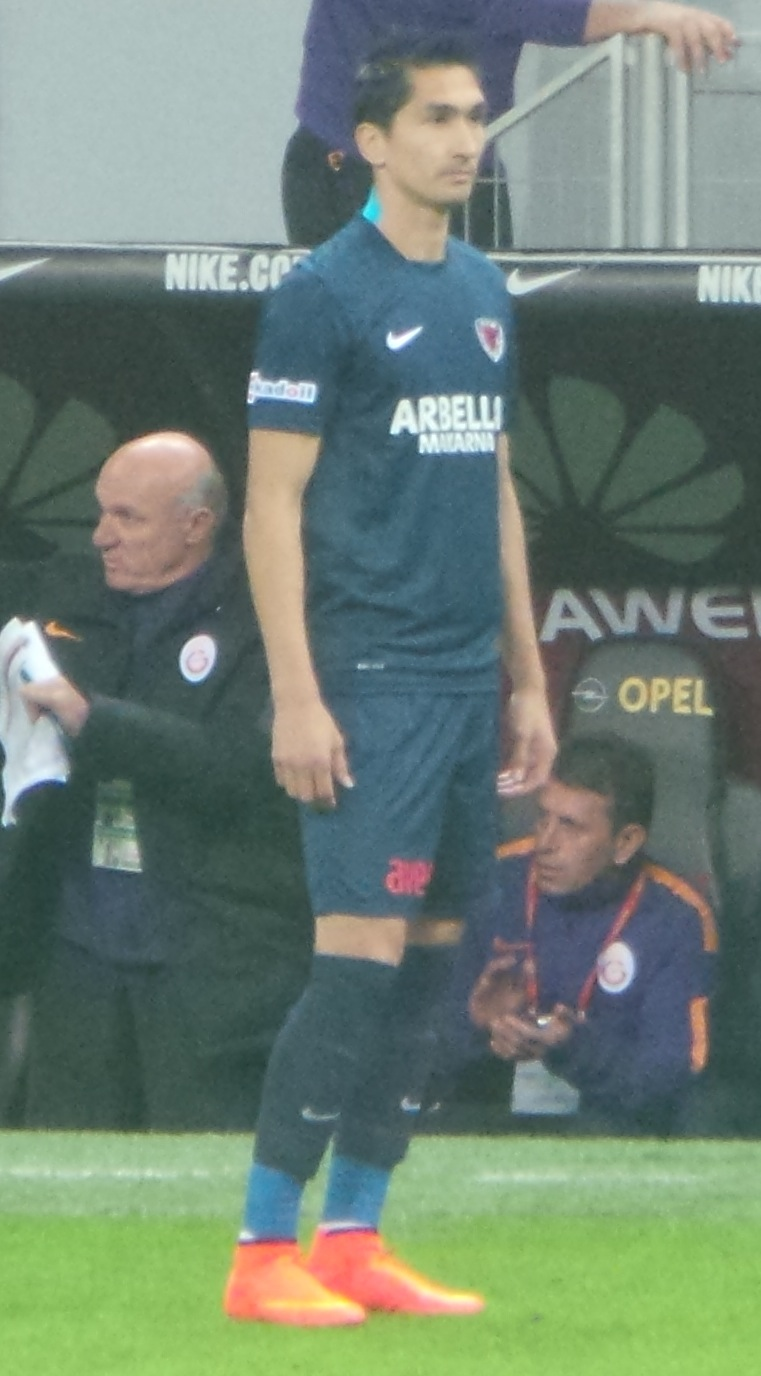

Personal information
- Full name: Ricardo Pedriel Suárez
- Date of birth: January 19, 1987 (age 39)
- Place of birth: Santa Cruz de la Sierra, Bolivia
- Height: 1.86 m (6 ft 1 in)
- Position: Forward

Team information
- Current team: Blooming

Youth career
- 2002–2006: Wilstermann

Senior career*
Years	Team	Apps	(Gls)
2006–2008	Wilstermann	70	(33)
2008–2009	Steaua București	4	(0)
2009–2010	Steaua II București	12	(8)
2009–2010	→ Giresunspor (loan)	27	(13)
2010–2013	Sivasspor	90	(20)
2014	Bolívar	10	(2)
2014–2017	Mersin İdmanyurdu	74	(15)
2017–2020	Wilstermann	75	(19)
2021–	Blooming	0	(0)

International career^{‡}
2007	Bolivia U-20	4	(0)
2008–2020	Bolivia	20	(3)
- * Club domestic league appearances and goals as of 7 March 2020 ‡ National team caps and goals as of 10 July 2011

Ricardo Pedriel Suárez (born 19 January 1987) is a Bolivian footballer who plays as a forward for Wilstermann.

== Club career ==
In 2009–10, Pedriel was demoted to the B squad of Steaua București.

In July 2009, he agreed a loan deal with Giresunspor, which participates in the Bank Asya First League.

In June 2010, he agreed a deal with Sivasspor.

== International career ==
Pedriel was picked to join Bolivia in the 2007 U-20 South American Championship held in Paraguay, where he played in four games.

On 6 February 2008, he made his debut with the senior Bolivia national team during a friendly match against Peru in La Paz, scoring his first international goal.

As of June 2016, he represented his country in 3 FIFA World Cup qualification matches.

=== International goals ===
Scores and results list Bolivia's goal tally first. "Score" column indicates the score after the player's goal.

#	Date	Venue	Opponent	Score	Result	Competition
1.	6 February 2008	Estadio Hernando Siles, La Paz, Bolivia	Peru	1–0	2–1	Friendly
2.	29 March 2011	Estadio Carlos Salazar Hijo, Mazatenango, Guatemala	Guatemala	1–1	1–1	Friendly
3.	29 February 2012	Estadio Félix Capriles, Cochabamba, Bolivia	Cuba	1–0	1–0	Friendly
