= 2015 Copa América =

Copa América Chile 2015
- El Corazón del Fútbol; Portuguese: O Coração do Futebol; English: The Heart of Football

Tournament details
- Host country: Chile
- Dates: 11 June – 4 July
- Teams: 12 (from 2 confederations)
- Venues: 9 (in 8 host cities)

Final positions
- Champions: Chile (1st title)
- Runners-up: Argentina
- Third place: Peru
- Fourth place: Paraguay

Tournament statistics
- Matches played: 26
- Goals scored: 59 (2.27 per match)
- Attendance: 655,902 (25,227 per match)
- Top scorer(s): (Chile) Eduardo Vargas (Peru) Paolo Guerrero (4 goals each)
- Best player: (Argentina) Lionel Messi
- Best young player: (Colombia) Jeison Murillo
- Best goalkeeper: (Chile) Claudio Bravo
- Fair play award: Peru

The 2015 Copa América was the 44th edition of the Copa América, the main international football tournament for national teams in South America, and took place in Chile between 11 June and 4 July 2015. The competition was organized by CONMEBOL, South America's football governing body.

Twelve teams competed: the ten members of CONMEBOL and two guests from CONCACAF – Mexico and Jamaica, the latter of which competed in the Copa América for the first time.

Uruguay were the defending champions, but were eliminated by the host nation Chile in the quarter-finals. Chile won their first title, defeating Argentina in the final on penalties after a goalless draw. As winners, they qualified for the 2017 FIFA Confederations Cup in Russia.

== Host country ==
Originally, it was to be hosted by Brazil, as suggested by the Brazilian Football Confederation (CBF) in February 2011 due to CONMEBOL's rotation policy of tournaments being held in alphabetical order. However, due to the organization of the 2013 FIFA Confederations Cup, 2014 FIFA World Cup and the 2016 Summer Olympics in that country, Brazil decided against also hosting the Copa América. CONMEBOL's president Nicolas Leoz had mentioned the possibility of the tournament being organized in Mexico (despite this country not being a member of CONMEBOL) as part of the federation's centenary celebrations. Brazil and Chile's Football Federations discussed the idea of swapping around the order of being hosts of the 2015 and 2019 tournaments. The swap was made official in May 2012.

== Venues ==
There were nine different stadiums in eight cities used for the tournament. Most stadiums were renovated or rebuilt for the contest.

Santiago		Concepción	2015 Copa América (Chile)
Estadio Nacional	Estadio Monumental	Estadio Ester Roa	2015 Copa América (Chile)
Capacity: 48,745	Capacity: 47,347	Capacity: 30,448	2015 Copa América (Chile)
Viña del Mar	Antofagasta	Valparaíso	2015 Copa América (Chile)
Estadio Sausalito	Estadio Regional de Antofagasta	Estadio Elías Figueroa	2015 Copa América (Chile)
Capacity: 22,360	Capacity: 21,170	Capacity: 21,113	2015 Copa América (Chile)
Temuco	La Serena	Rancagua	2015 Copa América (Chile)
Estadio Germán Becker	Estadio La Portada	Estadio El Teniente	2015 Copa América (Chile)
Capacity: 18,413	Capacity: 18,243	Capacity: 13,849	2015 Copa América (Chile)

== Teams ==
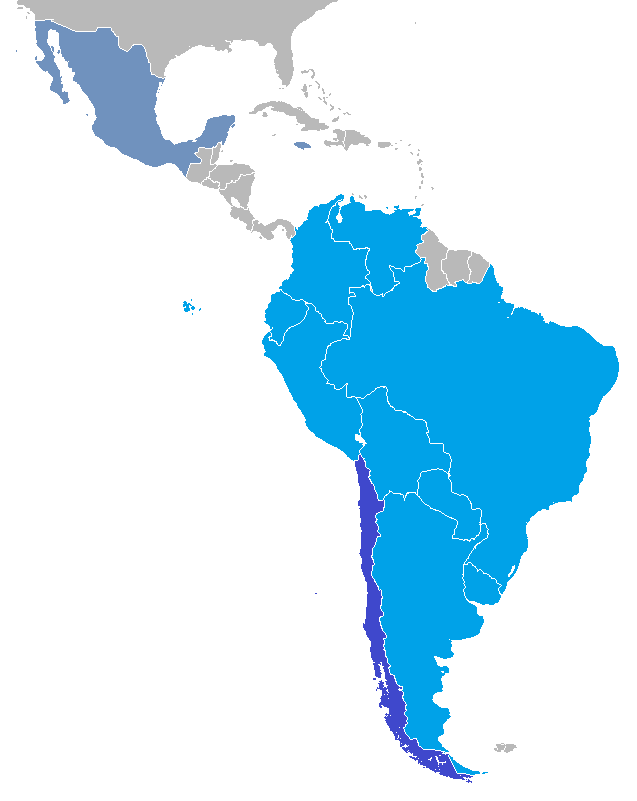
Map of the participating national football teams of the CONMEBOL's 2015 Copa América.

Mexico and Japan were initially invited to join the 10 CONMEBOL nations in the tournament. Japan declined the invitation, and China was invited instead, but later withdrew due to the Asian sector of qualification for the 2018 World Cup being held at the same time. In May 2014, it was announced that the Jamaica Football Federation had accepted an invitation to participate, thus making Jamaica the first Caribbean nation to compete in Copa América.

Argentina	Colombia	Paraguay
Bolivia	Ecuador	Peru
Brazil	Jamaica (invitee)	Uruguay (title holder)
Chile (host nation)	Mexico (invitee)	Venezuela

== Draw ==
The draw of the tournament was originally to be held on 27 October 2014 in Viña del Mar, but was postponed to 24 November. The 12 teams were drawn into three groups of four.

CONMEBOL announced the composition of the four pots on 10 November 2014. Pot 1 contained the hosts Chile (which has been automatically assigned to position A1), together with Argentina and Brazil. The remaining nine teams were allocated to the other three pots according to their FIFA World Rankings as of 23 October 2014 (shown in brackets), even though Colombia was rated higher than Brazil. On 23 November 2014, it was announced by CONMEBOL that Argentina and Brazil had been assigned to positions B1 and C1, respectively.

Pot 1	Pot 2	Pot 3	Pot 4
Chile (13) (hosts); Argentina (2); Brazil (6)	Colombia (3); Uruguay (8); Mexico (17)	Ecuador (27); Peru (54); Paraguay (76)	Venezuela (85); Bolivia (103); Jamaica (113)

== Squads ==
Each country had a final squad of 23 players (three of whom had to be goalkeepers) which had to be submitted before the deadline of 1 June 2015.

The 2015 UEFA Champions League Final date of 6 June caused problems for South American players for Barcelona and Juventus. FIFA international rules require clubs to release players 14 days prior to the start of an international tournament, but the players featured in the final, leaving them at most five days to acclimate. For example, Arturo Vidal arrived two days before Chile's first match against Ecuador, and played with little training with his national team.

Mexico manager Miguel Herrera decided to prioritize the upcoming 2015 CONCACAF Gold Cup, saying, "We have to win at all costs in order to face the United States in the playoffs that guarantee a spot in the 2017 Confederations Cup." The Mexican squad was a team composed mostly from the local league with little international experience.

Uruguayan forward Luis Suárez was suspended for the whole tournament, as he served a nine-match ban in international football for biting Italian defender Giorgio Chiellini during Uruguay's final group stage match against Italy in the 2014 FIFA World Cup.

== Match officials ==
Country	Referee	Assistant referees	Matches refereed
Argentina	Néstor Pitana	Hernán Maidana; Juan Pablo Belatti	Chile–Ecuador (Group A); Colombia–Peru (Group C)
Bolivia	Raúl Orosco	Javier Bustillos; Juan P. Montaño	Peru–Venezuela (Group C); Peru–Paraguay (Third place play-off)
Brazil	Sandro Ricci	Emerson de Carvalho; Fábio Pereira	Argentina–Uruguay (Group B); Chile–Uruguay (Quarter-finals); Argentina–Paraguay (Semi-finals)
Chile	Enrique Osses; Jorge Osorio; Julio Bascuñán	Carlos Astroza; Marcelo Barraza; Raúl Orellana	Osses–Astroza–Barraza: Brazil–Colombia (Group C); Bascuñán–Astroza–Barraza: Argentina–Jamaica (Group B)
Colombia	Wilmar Roldán	Alexander Guzmán; Cristian De La Cruz	Argentina–Paraguay (Group B); Bolivia–Peru (Quarter-finals); Chile–Argentina (Final)
Ecuador	Carlos Vera	Christian Lescano; Byron Romero	Paraguay–Jamaica (Group B)
Paraguay	Enrique Cáceres	Rodney Aquino; Carlos Cáceres	Chile–Mexico (Group A); Brazil–Venezuela (Group C)
Peru	Víctor Hugo Carrillo	César Escano; Jonny Bossio	Mexico–Bolivia (Group A)
Uruguay	Andrés Cunha	Mauricio Espinosa; Carlos Pastorino	Colombia–Venezuela (Group C); Chile–Bolivia (Group A); Brazil–Paraguay (Quarter-finals)
Venezuela	José Argote	Jorge Urrego; Jairo Romero	Uruguay–Jamaica (Group B); Mexico–Ecuador (Group A); Chile–Peru (Semi-finals)
El Salvador	Joel Aguilar	(Jamaica) Garnet Page (Jamaica) Ricardo Morgan	Ecuador–Bolivia (Group A)
Mexico	Roberto García	José Luis Camargo; Marvin Torrentera	Brazil–Peru (Group C); Uruguay–Paraguay (Group B); Argentina–Colombia (Quarter-finals)

== Group stage ==
The fixture schedule was announced on 11 November 2014.

The first round, or group stage, saw the twelve teams divided into three groups of four teams. Each group was a round-robin of six games, where each team played one match against each of the other teams in the same group. Teams were awarded three points for a win, one point for a draw and none for a defeat. The teams finishing first, second and two best-placed third teams in each group qualified for the quarter-finals.

Tie-breaking criteria

Teams were ranked on the following criteria:

1. Greater number of points in all group matches
2. Goal difference in all group matches
3. Greater number of goals scored in all group matches
4. Head-to-head result (between two teams only)
5. Drawing of lots by the CONMEBOL Organizing Committee

However, those normal tiebreaking criteria do not apply if on the last round of group stage, two teams are playing each other and tied by points 1–4 then drew the final game and no other teams are tied. In that case, their ranking is decided by a penalty shoot-out.

All times local, CLT (UTC−3).

=== Group A ===
Pos	Team	Pld	W	D	L	GF	GA	GD	Pts	Qualification
1	Chile (H)	3	2	1	0	10	3	+7	7	Advance to knockout stage
2	Bolivia	3	1	1	1	3	7	−4	4	Advance to knockout stage
3	Ecuador	3	1	0	2	4	6	−2	3	
4	Mexico	3	0	2	1	4	5	−1	2	

Source: CONMEBOL
Rules for classification: Tie-breaking criteria
(H) Hosts
11 June 2015
20:30

Chile	2–0	Ecuador
Vidal 66' (pen.); Vargas 83'	Report

Estadio Nacional, Santiago
Attendance: 46,000
Referee: Néstor Pitana (Argentina)
12 June 2015
20:30

Mexico	0–0	Bolivia
	Report

Estadio Sausalito, Viña del Mar
Attendance: 14,987
Referee: Enrique Cáceres (Paraguay)

15 June 2015
18:00

Ecuador	2–3	Bolivia
Valencia 47'; Bolaños 80'	Report	Raldes 4'; Dalence 17'; Moreno 42' (pen.)

Estadio Elías Figueroa, Valparaíso
Attendance: 5,982
Referee: Joel Aguilar (El Salvador)
15 June 2015
20:30

Chile	3–3	Mexico
Vidal 21', 54' (pen.); Vargas 41'	Report	Vuoso 20', 65'; Jiménez 28'

Estadio Nacional, Santiago
Attendance: 45,583
Referee: Víctor Hugo Carrillo (Peru)

19 June 2015
18:00

Mexico	1–2	Ecuador
Jiménez 63' (pen.)	Report	Bolaños 25'; Valencia 57'

Estadio El Teniente, Rancagua
Attendance: 11,051
Referee: José Argote (Venezuela)
19 June 2015
20:30

Chile	5–0	Bolivia
Aránguiz 2', 65'; Sánchez 36'; Medel 78'; Raldes 85' (o.g.)	Report

Estadio Nacional, Santiago
Attendance: 45,601
Referee: Andrés Cunha (Uruguay)

=== Group B ===
Pos	Team	Pld	W	D	L	GF	GA	GD	Pts	Qualification
1	Argentina	3	2	1	0	4	2	+2	7	Advance to knockout stage
2	Paraguay	3	1	2	0	4	3	+1	5	Advance to knockout stage
3	Uruguay	3	1	1	1	2	2	0	4	Advance to knockout stage
4	Jamaica	3	0	0	3	0	3	−3	0	

Source: CONMEBOL
Rules for classification: Tie-breaking criteria
13 June 2015
16:00

Uruguay	1–0	Jamaica
C. Rodríguez 51'	Report

Estadio Regional de Antofagasta, Antofagasta
Attendance: 8,653
Referee: José Argote (Venezuela)
13 June 2015
18:30

Argentina	2–2	Paraguay
Agüero 28'; Messi 35' (pen.)	Report	N. Valdez 59'; Barrios 89'

Estadio La Portada, La Serena
Attendance: 16,281
Referee: Wilmar Roldán (Colombia)

16 June 2015
18:00

Paraguay	1–0	Jamaica
Benítez 35'	Report

Estadio Regional de Antofagasta, Antofagasta
Attendance: 6,099
Referee: Carlos Vera (Ecuador)
16 June 2015
20:30

Argentina	1–0	Uruguay
Agüero 55'	Report

Estadio La Portada, La Serena
Attendance: 17,014
Referee: Sandro Ricci (Brazil)

20 June 2015
16:00

Uruguay	1–1	Paraguay
Giménez 28'	Report	Barrios 44'

Estadio La Portada, La Serena
Attendance: 16,021
Referee: Roberto García (Mexico)
20 June 2015
18:30

Argentina	1–0	Jamaica
Higuaín 10'	Report

Estadio Sausalito, Viña del Mar
Attendance: 21,083
Referee: Julio Bascuñán (Chile)

=== Group C ===
Pos	Team	Pld	W	D	L	GF	GA	GD	Pts	Qualification
1	Brazil	3	2	0	1	4	3	+1	6	Advance to knockout stage
2	Peru	3	1	1	1	2	2	0	4	Advance to knockout stage
3	Colombia	3	1	1	1	1	1	0	4	Advance to knockout stage
4	Venezuela	3	1	0	2	2	3	−1	3	

Source: CONMEBOL
Rules for classification: Tie-breaking criteria
14 June 2015
16:00

Colombia	0–1	Venezuela
	Report	Rondón 59'

Estadio El Teniente, Rancagua
Attendance: 12,387
Referee: Andrés Cunha (Uruguay)
14 June 2015
18:30

Brazil	2–1	Peru
Neymar 4'; Douglas Costa 90+1'	Report	Cueva 2'

Estadio Municipal Germán Becker, Temuco
Attendance: 16,342
Referee: Roberto García (Mexico)

17 June 2015
21:00

Brazil	0–1	Colombia
	Report	Murillo 36'

Estadio Monumental David Arellano, Santiago
Attendance: 44,008
Referee: Enrique Osses (Chile)
18 June 2015
20:30

Peru	1–0	Venezuela
Pizarro 71'	Report

Estadio Elías Figueroa, Valparaíso
Attendance: 15,542
Referee: Raúl Orosco (Bolivia)

21 June 2015
16:00

Colombia	0–0	Peru
	Report

Estadio Municipal Germán Becker, Temuco
Attendance: 17,231
Referee: Néstor Pitana (Argentina)
21 June 2015
18:30

Brazil	2–1	Venezuela
Thiago Silva 8'; Firmino 51'	Report	Miku 84'

Estadio Monumental David Arellano, Santiago
Attendance: 33,284
Referee: Enrique Cáceres (Paraguay)

=== Ranking of third placed teams ===
Pos	Grp	Team	Pld	W	D	L	GF	GA	GD	Pts	Qualification
1	B	Uruguay	3	1	1	1	2	2	0	4	Advance to knockout stage
2	C	Colombia	3	1	1	1	1	1	0	4	Advance to knockout stage
3	A	Ecuador	3	1	0	2	4	6	−2	3	

Source: CONMEBOL
Rules for classification: 1) points in all group matches; 2) total goal differential; 3) total goals scored; 4) lots drawn by CONMEBOL.

== Knockout stage ==
In the knockout stage, the eight teams played a single-elimination tournament, with the following rules:

- In the quarter-finals, teams from the same group could not play each other.
- In the quarter-finals, semi-finals, and third place play-off, if tied after 90 minutes, a penalty shoot-out was used to determine the winner (no extra time was played).
- In the final, if tied after 90 minutes, 30 minutes of extra time were played. If still tied after extra time, a penalty shoot-out was used to determine the winner.

=== Bracket ===
Quarter-finals
24 June – Santiago (EN)
Chile	1
Uruguay	0
25 June – Temuco
Bolivia	1
Peru	3
26 June – Viña del Mar
Argentina (p)	0 (5)
Colombia	0 (4)
27 June – Concepción
Brazil	1 (3)
Paraguay (p)	1 (4)

Semi-finals
29 June – Santiago (EN)
Chile	2
Peru	1
30 June – Concepción
Argentina	6
Paraguay	1

Final
4 July – Santiago (EN)
Chile (p)	0 (4)
Argentina	0 (1)
Third place play-off
3 July – Concepción
Peru	2
Paraguay	0

=== Quarter-finals ===
24 June 2015
20:30

Chile	1–0	Uruguay
Isla 80'	Report

Estadio Nacional, Santiago
Attendance: 45,304
Referee: Sandro Ricci (Brazil)

25 June 2015
20:30

Bolivia	1–3	Peru
Moreno 83' (pen.)	Report	Guerrero 19', 22', 73'

Estadio Municipal Germán Becker, Temuco
Attendance: 16,872
Referee: Wilmar Roldán (Colombia)

26 June 2015
20:30

Argentina	0–0	Colombia
	Report
Penalties
Messi (penalty scored); Garay (penalty scored); Banega (penalty scored); Lavezzi (penalty scored); Biglia (penalty missed); Rojo (penalty missed); Tevez (penalty scored)	5–4	(penalty scored) Rodríguez; (penalty scored) Falcao; (penalty scored) Cuadrado; (penalty missed) Muriel; (penalty scored) Cardona; (penalty missed) Zúñiga; (penalty missed) Murillo

Estadio Sausalito, Viña del Mar
Attendance: 21,508
Referee: Roberto García (Mexico)

27 June 2015
18:30

Brazil	1–1	Paraguay
Robinho 14'	Report	González 71' (pen.)
Penalties
Fernandinho (penalty scored); Ribeiro (penalty missed); Miranda (penalty scored); Douglas Costa (penalty missed); Coutinho (penalty scored)	3–4	(penalty scored) Martínez; (penalty scored) V. Cáceres; (penalty scored) Bobadilla; (penalty missed) Santa Cruz; (penalty scored) González

Estadio Municipal de Concepción, Concepción
Attendance: 29,276
Referee: Andrés Cunha (Uruguay)

=== Semi-finals ===
29 June 2015
20:30

Chile	2–1	Peru
Vargas 41', 63'	Report	Medel 60' (o.g.)

Estadio Nacional, Santiago
Attendance: 45,651
Referee: José Argote (Venezuela)

30 June 2015
20:30

Argentina	6–1	Paraguay
Rojo 14'; Pastore 26'; Di María 46', 52'; Agüero 79'; Higuaín 82'	Report	Barrios 42'

Estadio Municipal de Concepción, Concepción
Attendance: 29,205
Referee: Sandro Ricci (Brazil)

=== Third place play-off ===
3 July 2015
20:30

Peru	2–0	Paraguay
Carrillo 47'; Guerrero 88'	Report

Estadio Municipal de Concepción, Concepción
Attendance: 29,143
Referee: Raúl Orosco (Bolivia)

=== Final ===
4 July 2015
17:00

Chile	0–0 (a.e.t.)	Argentina
	Report
Penalties
Fernández (penalty scored); Vidal (penalty scored); Aránguiz (penalty scored); Sánchez (penalty scored)	4–1	(penalty scored) Messi; (penalty missed) Higuaín; (penalty missed) Banega

Estadio Nacional, Santiago
Attendance: 45,693
Referee: Wilmar Roldán (Colombia)

== Statistics ==
=== Goalscorers ===
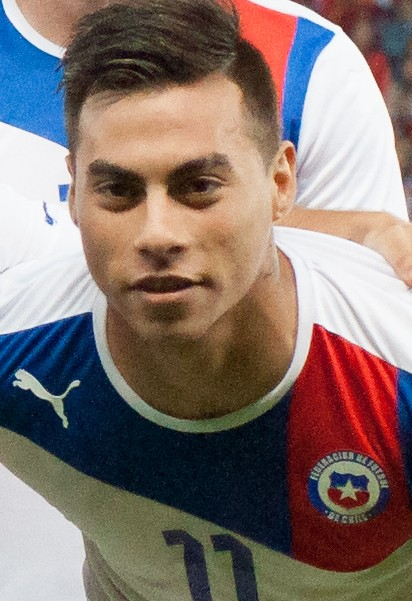
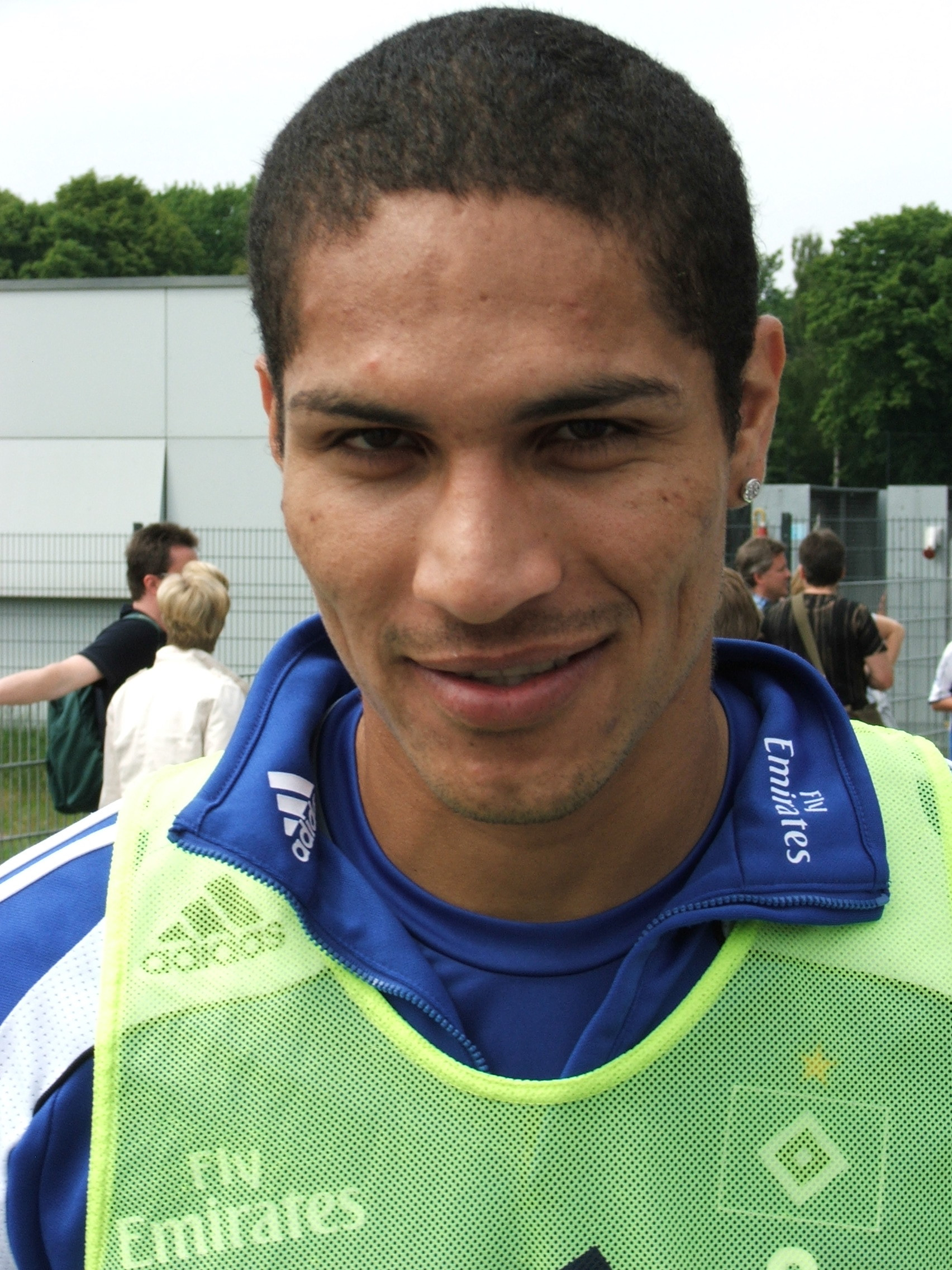
Eduardo Vargas (left) and Paolo Guerrero, top scorers

Chile's Eduardo Vargas and Peru's Paolo Guerrero scored the most goals, with 4 each. There were 59 goals scored in 26 matches, for an average of 2.27 goals per match.

4 goals

- (Chile) Eduardo Vargas
- (Peru) Paolo Guerrero

3 goals

- (Argentina) Sergio Agüero
- (Chile) Arturo Vidal
- (Paraguay) Lucas Barrios

2 goals

- (Argentina) Ángel Di María
- (Argentina) Gonzalo Higuaín
- (Bolivia) Marcelo Moreno
- (Chile) Charles Aránguiz
- (Ecuador) Miller Bolaños
- (Ecuador) Enner Valencia
- (Mexico) Raúl Jiménez
- (Mexico) Matías Vuoso

1 goal

- (Argentina) Lionel Messi
- (Argentina) Javier Pastore
- (Argentina) Marcos Rojo
- (Bolivia) Ronald Raldes
- (Bolivia) Martin Smedberg-Dalence
- (Brazil) Douglas Costa
- (Brazil) Neymar
- (Brazil) Roberto Firmino
- (Brazil) Robinho
- (Brazil) Thiago Silva
- (Chile) Mauricio Isla
- (Chile) Gary Medel
- (Chile) Alexis Sánchez
- (Colombia) Jeison Murillo
- (Paraguay) Édgar Benítez
- (Paraguay) Derlis González
- (Paraguay) Nelson Valdez
- (Peru) André Carrillo
- (Peru) Christian Cueva
- (Peru) Claudio Pizarro
- (Uruguay) José Giménez
- (Uruguay) Cristian Rodríguez
- (Venezuela) Miku
- (Venezuela) Salomón Rondón

1 own goal

- (Bolivia) Ronald Raldes (against Chile)
- (Chile) Gary Medel (against Peru)

=== Assists ===
3 assists

- (Argentina) Lionel Messi
- (Chile) Jorge Valdivia

2 assists

- (Argentina) Ángel Di María
- (Brazil) Dani Alves
- (Mexico) Adrián Aldrete

=== Winners ===
2015 Copa América champions

Chile
1st title

=== Awards ===
The following awards were given at the conclusion of the tournament.

- Golden Ball Award: This was the first time of Copa America's history "Golden Ball Award" cancelled. Lionel Messi rejected it but Argentina's staff was to receive the award.
- Golden Boot Award: (Chile) Eduardo Vargas and (Peru) Paolo Guerrero (4 goals each)
- Best Young Player Award: (Colombia) Jeison Murillo
- Golden Glove Award: (Chile) Claudio Bravo
- Fair Play Award: Peru

=== Final Man of the Match Award ===
- (Chile) Arturo Vidal

=== Team of the Tournament ===
Goalkeeper	Defenders	Midfielders	Forwards	Manager
(Chile) Claudio Bravo	(Colombia) Jeison Murillo (Chile) Gary Medel (Argentina) Nicolás Otamendi	(Peru) Christian Cueva (Chile) Marcelo Díaz (Argentina) Javier Mascherano (Chile) Arturo Vidal	(Chile) Eduardo Vargas (Peru) Paolo Guerrero (Argentina) Lionel Messi	Jorge Sampaoli (Chile)

== Marketing ==
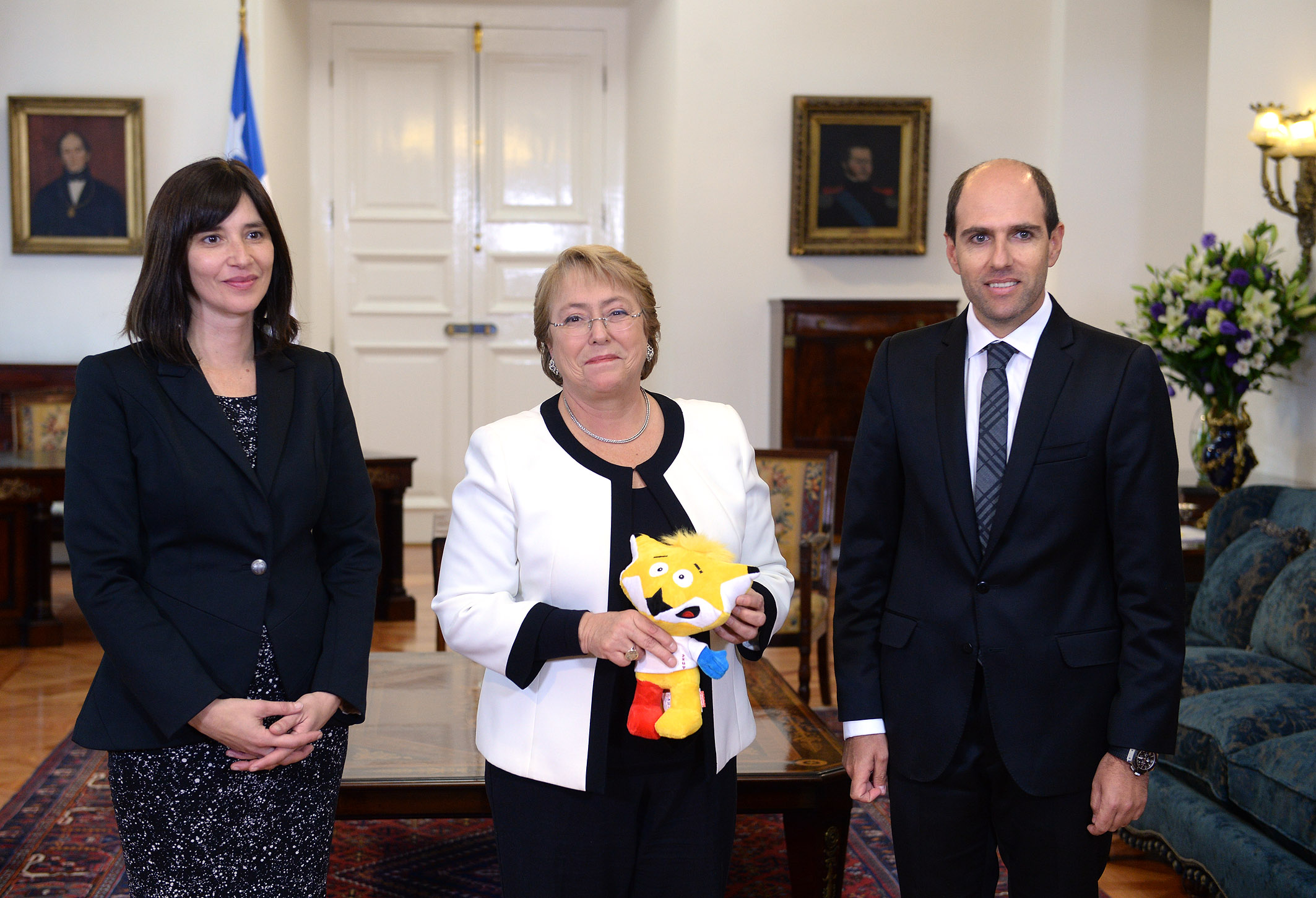
Chilean president Michelle Bachelet with Zincha, the 2015 Copa América mascot.

=== Sponsorship ===
- Banco Santander
- MasterCard
- Kia Motors
- America Móvil (Claro Americas and Telcel)
- The Coca-Cola Company
- Kellogg's (Pringles)
- DHL
- LAN-TAM
- Canon
- Airbnb
- Opta Sports
- Aggreko
- Arena sport TV

=== Logo and slogan ===
On 2 April 2014, the official logo was unveiled, along with the slogan "El Corazón del Fútbol" ("The Heart of Football").

=== Match ball ===
On 16 November 2014, the official match ball (OMB) was unveiled at the Estadio Nacional. The name of the ball is Nike Cachaña, which is a Chilean slang term for a successful feint or dribble. During its launch, the Chilean international Arturo Vidal was present. The ball is mainly designed with white as main appearance featured with blue and red applications, representing host nation Chile. The colors of Chilean flag make a statement in the design of this ball: the red representing the people, the blue symbolizing the Chilean sky, and the white for the Andes that so strongly define the geography of this country.

=== Mascot ===
The official mascot of the tournament, a young culpeo fox, was unveiled on 17 November 2014. The name of the mascot, "Zincha" (from Zorro (fox) and hINCHA (fan)), was chosen by the public over two other options, "Andi" and "Kul".

=== Official song ===
"Al Sur del Mundo" by Chilean group Noche de Brujas served as the official song of the tournament. It was performed during the opening ceremony of the competition on 11 June. It features the different cultures of the twelve competing nations.

== Incidents and controversies ==
The day after Chile's 3–3 draw against Mexico in their second group match, Jorge Sampaoli gave the players a day off from training. They had to return to the training ground by 9pm, but Arturo Vidal did not arrive. He had been involved in a traffic accident on his way back to the ground, and arrested for driving under the influence. He spent the night in jail, and appeared in court the morning after. His driving license was revoked, and he was sentenced to pay for the damage done. Although there was speculation that he would be dropped, Sampaoli opted to keep him on the team.

An on-pitch brawl broke out following Colombia's 1–0 win over Brazil in their second group match; Brazilian captain Neymar deliberately kicked the ball at opponent Pablo Armero and attempted to headbutt Colombian matchwinner Jeison Murillo, earning a red card. As a result, Colombian forward Carlos Bacca retaliated by pushing Neymar over, and was himself sent off. CONMEBOL fined Neymar $10,000 and suspended him for four matches, ruling him out for the remainder of the tournament, while Bacca was suspended for two matches.

In Chile's quarter-final victory over Uruguay, full-back Gonzalo Jara poked Uruguayan forward Edinson Cavani in the anus, and then fell when Cavani slapped him in retaliation. Both Cavani and Jara received a yellow card for the incident, which resulted in Cavani being sent off because he had previously received another yellow card for insulting one of the referees' assistants. Jara was later suspended for two games, which made him miss the rest of the tournament. His club, Mainz 05 of Germany, criticized Jara for the incident and stated that he would be sold. However he would remain with the club until 16 January 2016 when he agreed to terminate his contract with them.
