= José Argote =

Venezuelan football referee

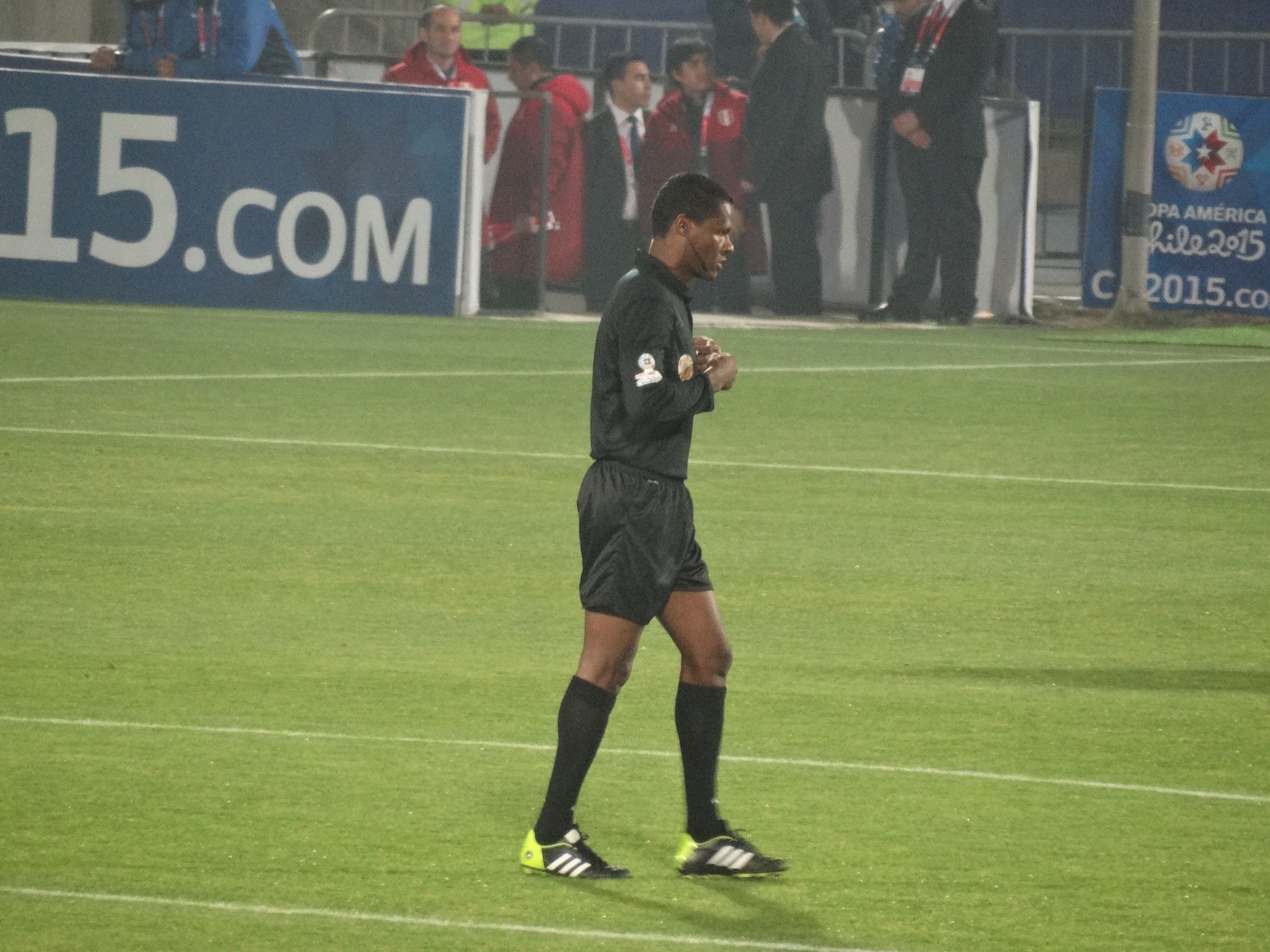

José Ramón Argote Vega (born 17 October 1980 in Maracaibo, Zulia) is a Venezuelan football referee. He works as a vet and became FIFA ref in 2008, and is a CONMEBOL category 3 referee.
