= Sandro Ricci =

Brazilian football referee and analyst

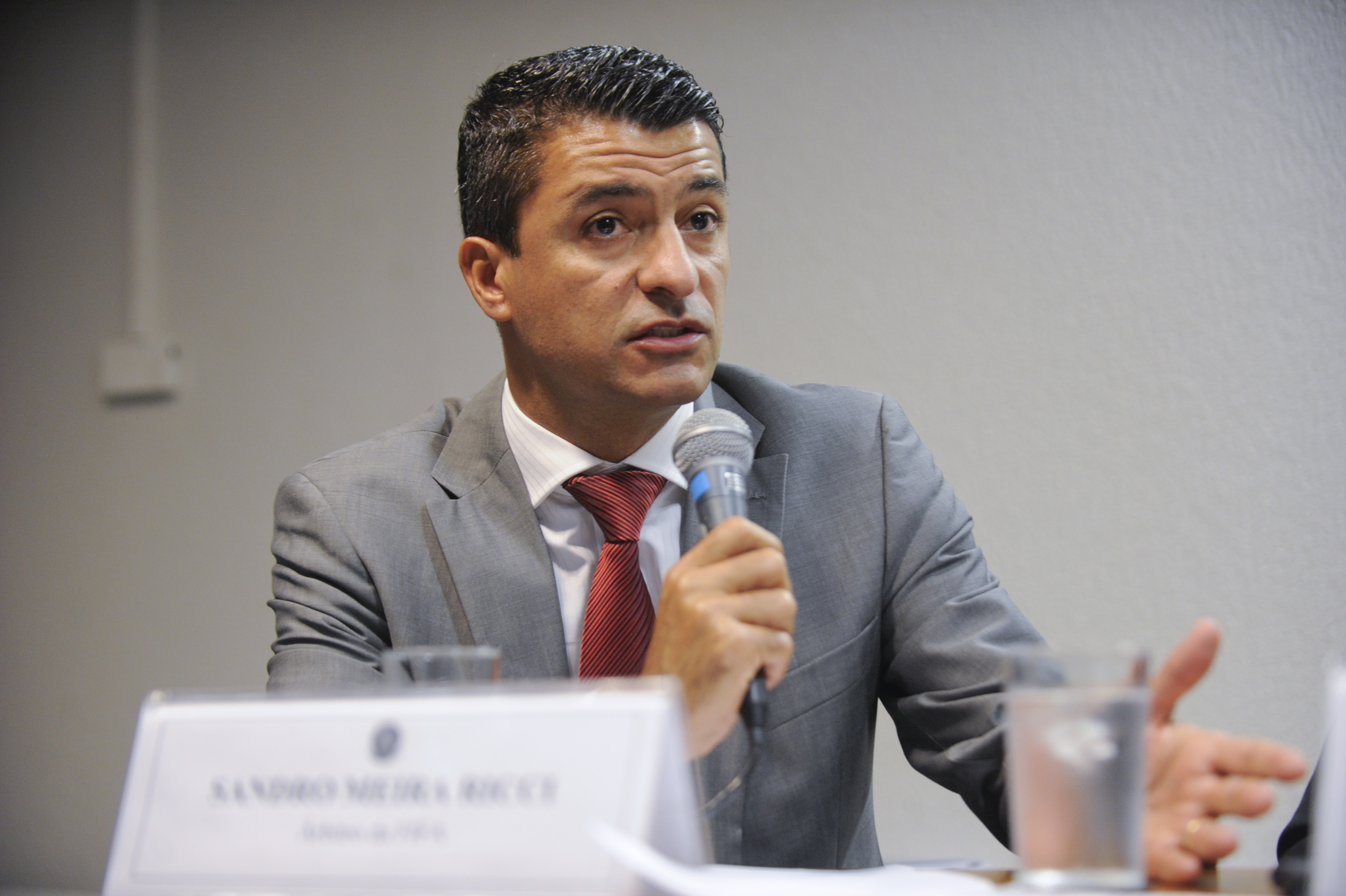
- Full name: Sandro Meira Ricci
- Born: 19 November 1974 (age 51); Poços de Caldas, Minas Gerais, Brazil

Domestic
Years	League	Role
–2018	Campeonato Brasileiro Série A	Referee

International
Years	League	Role
2011–2018	FIFA listed	Referee

Sandro Meira Ricci (born 19 November 1974) is a retired Brazilian football referee. He refereed at 2014 FIFA World Cup qualifiers, beginning with the match between Ecuador and Paraguay on 26 March 2013.

In March 2013, FIFA added Ricci to its list of candidate referees for the 2014 FIFA World Cup.

Ricci was the Brazilian referee at the 2014 FIFA World Cup, along with assistant referees Emerson de Carvalho and Marcelo Van Gasse. During his debut match France-Honduras, which was played on 15 June 2014, he was the first referee in the world to validate a goal by means of the newly introduced goal line technology. He was selected once again to be the Brazilian referee at the 2018 FIFA World Cup on Russia. After the tournament, he announced his retirement as a referee. After stepping down on his referee career, he was hired as a football refereeing and rules analyst by Globo.

== Referring Statistics ==
Totals
Additionals	Home	Away	Total
Penalties	16	4	20
Yellow Cards	167	208	375
Red Cards	9	23	32

Average (per match)
Additionals	Home	Away	Total
Penalties	0.2	0.05	0.13
Yellow Cards	2.11	2.63	2.37
Red Cards	0.11	0.29	0.2

Preceded by (Turkey) Cüneyt Çakır	FIFA Club World Cup final match referees 2013 (Brazil) Sandro Ricci	Succeeded by (Guatemala) Walter López

Preceded by Carlos Eugênio Simon	(Brazil) Brazilian FIFA World Cup referee 2014, 2018	Succeeded by Raphael Claus, Wilton Sampaio
