= 2025 Canneseries =

2025 television festival

2025 Cannes International Series Festival
- Location: Cannes, France
- Founded: 2018
- Awards: Best Series (A Better Man)
- Festival date: 24–29 April 2025
- Website: canneseries.com/en

Canneseries
- 2026 2024

The 8th Cannes International Series Festival is a television festival that took place from 24 to 29 April 2025 in Cannes, France. Actress Nicola Coughlan was honored with the Konbini Prix de l'Engagement for "actively making change well beyond television". Director Éric Rochant and the cast of The Bureau were honored with Canal+ Icon Award. The Madame Figaro Rising Star Award was presented to French actress Marie Colomb.

The award for Best Series went to Norwegian psychological thriller series A Better Man by Thomas Seeberg Torjussen.

== Juries ==
The following juries were named for the festival.

=== Competition ===
- Jeff Russo, American composer, Jury President (Note: Actor Norman Reedus was supposed to be the Jury President but cancelled due to work commitment. Russo replaced him.)
- Louise Bourgoin, French actress
- César Domboy, French actor
- Lola Dueñas, Spanish actress
- Soo Hugh, American showrunner

=== Short Form Competition ===
- Marnie Blok, Dutch actress, Jury President
- Omari Douglas, English actor
- Fauve Hautot, French artist

=== Docuseries Competition ===
- Philippe Falardeau, French-Canadian director, Jury President
- Asma Mhalla, French author
- Narges Rashidi, German-Iranian actress

== Official selection ==
=== In competition ===
The following series were selected to compete:

Title	Original title	Creator(s)	Production countrie(s)	Network
A Better Man	Ølhunden Berit	Thomas Seeberg Torjussen	Norway, Lithuania	NRK, ZDFneo
Dead End	Dood Spoor	Malin-Sarah Gozin	Belgium	Play4, Streamz
How to Kill Your Sister		Pedro Elias, Evelien Broekaert	Belgium, Germany	Play4, Streamz, ZDFneo
L/over	L/over - ikuisesti minun	Marika Makaroff, Frog Stone, Nina Honkanen	Finland	MTV
Malditos		Jean Charles Hue, Olivier Prieur, Guillaume Grosse, Laurent Teyssier	France	Max
Nepobaby		Henriette Steenstrup, Siri Seljeseth	Norway	TV 2 A/S
Reykjavik Fusion		Hörður Rúnarsson, Birkir Blær Ingólfsson	Iceland	Arte, Síminn
S Line	에스라인	Handae Rhee	South Korea	

=== Out of competition ===
Title	Original title	Creator(s)	Production countrie(s)	Network
The Agency		Jez Butterworth, John-Henry Butterworth	United States	Paramount+ with Showtime, Canal+
The Big Fuck-Up	De big fuck-up	Philippe de Schepper, Bas Adriaensen	Belgium	Streamz, Amazon Prime Video
The Corsican Line	Plaine Orientale	Pierre Leccia	France	Canal+
The Count of Monte Cristo		Bille August	Italy, France	RAI, France Télévisions
Duster		J. J. Abrams, LaToya Morgan	United States	Max
Holy Sh!t		Mariano Vanhoof, Nore Maatala	Belgium	Streamz
The Walking Dead: Dead City (season 2)		Eli Jorné	United States	AMC
Rendez-Vous
À La Poursuite du Rougail Saucisses		Manu Payet	France	Canal+
The Art of Crime		Angèle Herry-Leclerc, Pierre-Yves Mora	France	France Télévisions
A Better Place		Alexander Lindh, Laurent Mercier	Germany, Austria	WDR, ARD Degeto, Canal+
Aspergirl (season 2)		Judith Godinot, Hadrien Cousin	France, Belgium	Ciné+ OCS, BeTV
Bewitched (1964) (season 1)		Sol Saks	United States	ABC
Escort Boys (season 2)		Ruben Alves	France	Amazon Prime Video
Jailbreakers		Marine Maugrain-Legagneur, Quentin Pissot, Alicia Pratx	France	France Télévisions
Kun by Agüero		Justin Webster	Argentina	Disney+
Ma femme est une espionne!		Jean Prévost	France	M6
Maintenant ou Jamais: FC Montfermeil		Guillaume Thevenin, Nicholas Thevenin	France	Max
Rien ne t'efface		Anne Rambach, Marine Rambach, Michel Bussi	France	TF1
Surface		Slimane-Baptiste Berhoun	France	France Télévisions
Korean Fiction
Doubt	이토록 친밀한 배신자	Han Ah-young	South Korea	MBC TV
Fasting Love		Eunice Lee, Joonhan Lee, ChangGeun Cho	South Korea	
Hunter with a Scalpel		Choi Ido	South Korea	
Nursery Rhyme Horror Story		Dae-Hwa Koh	South Korea	

=== Short Form Competition ===
Title	Original title	Creator(s)	Production countrie(s)	Network
Dorm No. 13	Tupa 13	Teemu Nikki	Finland	Yle
Getting Under Your Skin	M'infiltrer dans ta vie	Simon Boulerice	Canada	Unis TV
Lost Media		Timothée Hochet, Lucas Pastor	France	Canal+
n00b		Victoria Boult, Rachel Fawcett	New Zealand	Three
Oh, Otto!		Stijn Van Kerkhoven	Belgium	Streamz
Rebound		Melike Leblebicioglu Kaveh	Norway	NULL47

=== Docuseries Competition ===
Title	Original title	Creator(s)	Production countrie(s)	Network
The Agent – The Life and Lies of My Father	Agenten - Pappas liv og løgner	Magnus Skatvold	Norway	NRK
Fulgurated, When Lightning Does Not Kill	Fulgurée, quand la foudre ne tue pas	Emilie Grall, Mickaël Royer	France	Planète+
Hello Stranger	Dag Vreemde Man	Younes Haidar, Jasper Declercq, Nahid Shaikh	Belgium	Streamz
In Real Life	La Vraie Vie	Ekiem Barbier, Guilhem Causse	France	Arte France
The Nazi Cartel	Das Nazi-Kartell	Andreas Banz, Alexander Lahl, Christian Asanger, Vesna Cudic, Felix Kempter, Christian Bergmann	Germany	Sky Deutschland, ZDFinfo

== Awards ==
The following awards were presented at the festival:

- Best Series: A Better Man by Thomas Seeberg Torjussen
- Best Screenplay: Henriette Steenstrup, Siri Seljeseth, and Tina Rygh for Nepobaby
- Best Music: Junoh Lee for S Line
- Best Performance: Anders Baasmo Christiansen for A Better Man
- Special Interpretation Award: The ensemble cast of Nepobaby
- High School Award for Best Series: A Better Man by Thomas Seeberg Torjussen
- Best Short Form Series: Oh, Otto! by Stijn Van Kerkhoven
- Student Award for Best Short Form Series: Oh, Otto! by Stijn Van Kerkhoven
- Best Documentary: The Agent – The Life and Lies of My Father by Magnus Skatvold
- Europe 1 Audience Award: La fièvre by Eric Benzekri
