= Thomas de Mallet Burgess =

American dancer, choreographer and director

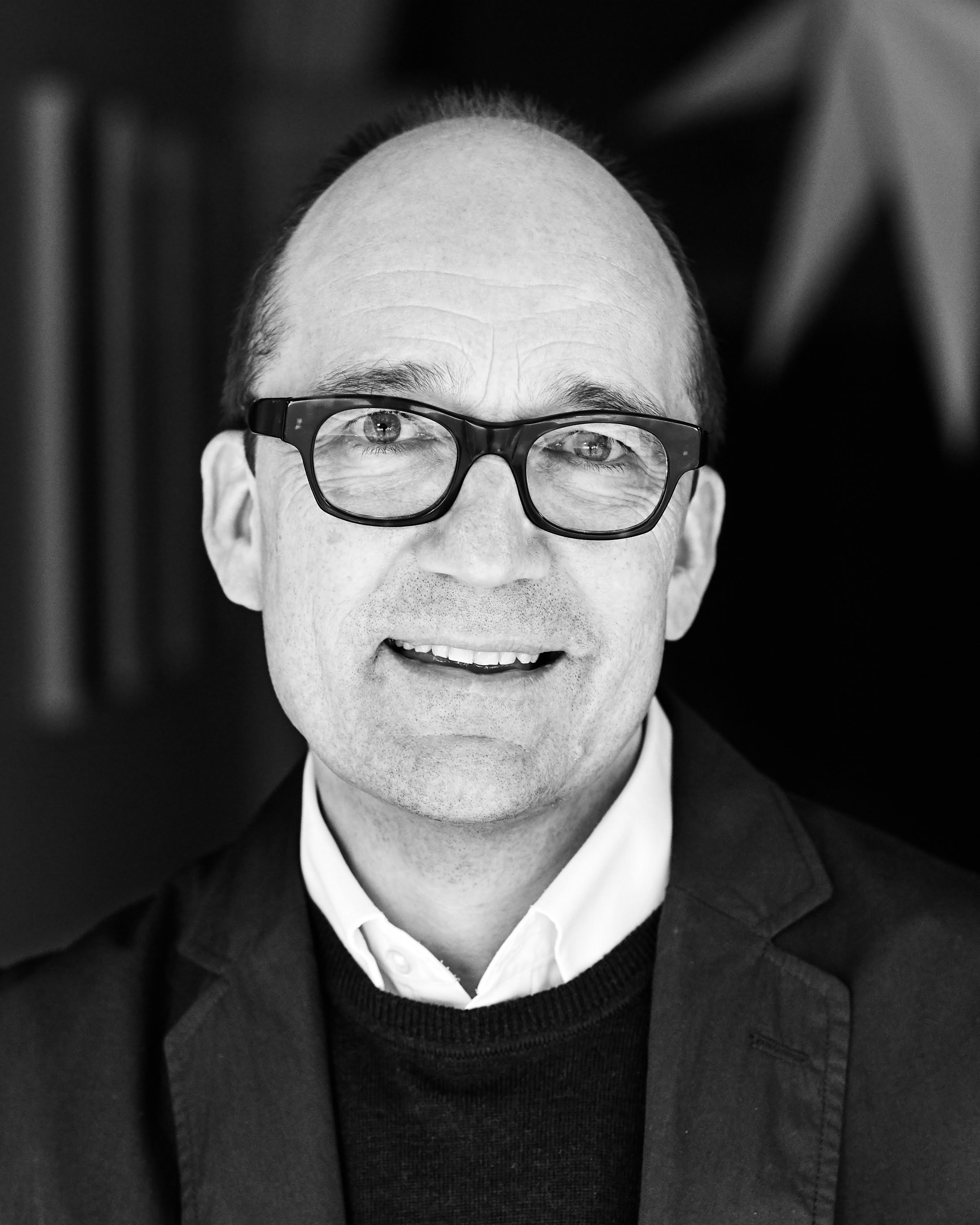
- Burgess in 2018
- Born: 1964 (age 61–62); UK
- Occupation: Opera director
- Website: demalletburgess.com

Thomas de Mallet Burgess (born 1964) is a theatre, musical theatre, and opera director from the United Kingdom. He founded the Perth opera company Lost & Found, and was General Director of New Zealand Opera from 2018 to 2023 before selected as artistic director of Finnish National Opera.

== Early years ==
Burgess grew up in Barnstaple, North Devon, where he was involved with amateur theatre. He was educated at St Edmund Hall, Oxford, where he studied Philosophy and Modern Languages, graduating with a BA and MA.

== Career ==
Burgess began his career as a theatre director in London, staging in pub venues. He went on to produce and direct works at the Edinburgh Festival Fringe. His first production as an opera director at around the age of 30 was a student production of Menotti's The Medium. As he later put it, "The first opera I directed was the first I listened to."

He was Staff Director and Revival Director at the Royal Opera House, Covent Garden, directing Thomas Hampson in his Royal Opera House debut.

He has been a visiting professor and guest director at several music academies and conservatories, including the Royal Academy of Music, Royal Irish Academy of Music, California State University, Fresno, the Guildhall School of Music and Drama, and the Western Australian Academy of Performing Arts. In 2000–2004 he was visiting professor of Opera at the University of Cincinnati College-Conservatory of Music.

Burgess was Creative Director at the Wexford Opera House in Ireland, now the National Opera House, Ireland's first purpose-built opera house and home of the Wexford Festival Opera.

As well as directing opera, Burgess has been a theatre director in Belgium, Romania, and the UK, and has commissioned and developed plays by new Irish writers.

As Education Consultant with English Touring Opera he pioneered a three-year programme on music with the Deaf Community, and worked on community outreach programmes to bring opera to deprived communities in the UK.

In 2012 Burgess moved to Perth, Australia, with his wife, Perth-raised soprano Fiona McAndrew, with the aim of setting up his own opera company. In 2013 with conductor and musical director Christopher van Tuinen he founded Lost & Found Opera, a company which revived unusual operas and performed them in unconventional spaces, and for five years was its artistic director. At the same time he was Coordinator of Cultural Services for the City of Joondalup, where he gained experience in arts administration and directed the Joondalup Festival.

In July 2018 Burgess was appointed General Director of New Zealand Opera, succeeding Stuart Maunder. The company was in financial difficulties and needed to rebuild its relationship with sponsors and funding agencies. One of Burgess's tasks was to respond to a 2015 review of the company and create a new strategic direction. This involved producing smaller-scale operas in unconventional spaces, such as Wellington and Auckland productions of Eight Songs for a Mad King staged in a corporate boardroom with an audience both inside and outside, the latter listening via headphones. In 2020 he staged Handel's Semele in Auckland's Holy Trinity Cathedral, with soprano Emma Pearson as Semele and Amitai Pati, in his NZ Opera debut, as Jove. The live performance was filmed by Rebecca Tansley from Greenstone TV and distributed internationally on DVD/Blu-Ray, winning Best Entertainment Programme at the 2022 New Zealand Television Awards.

As part of the new strategic direction, Burgess commissioned a comic opera based on the saga of the "unruly tourists", a group of British travellers who were the focus of a New Zealand media frenzy in the summer of 2019. The novel production attracted much media attention and controversy, and a six-part Stuff documentary series, Unruly, was commissioned to follow the course of the production. In 2021 three New Zealand Opera board members resigned, stating concerns about New Zealand Opera's general artistic direction, and the staging of new operas at the expense of the standard repertoire. Burgess stated that "opera as a global form must be supporting the writing of new operas if the art form is to remain relevant to time and place."

In October 2022 Burgess was selected as the new artistic director of Finnish National Opera, taking up the position on 1 August 2023.

Burgess's career as an opera director has focussed on making opera relevant and accessible. He believes opera needs to remain vibrant and alive: "It may be a controversial view, but I believe some operas, even beloved ones, should be shelved, at least for the time being—even though a lot of people simply want productions they already know and love. [...] New generations shouldn't feel they need carry the baggage from the past 200 years into the present and instead should look at creating new works."

== Personal life ==
Burgess is married and has two daughters.

== Operas ==
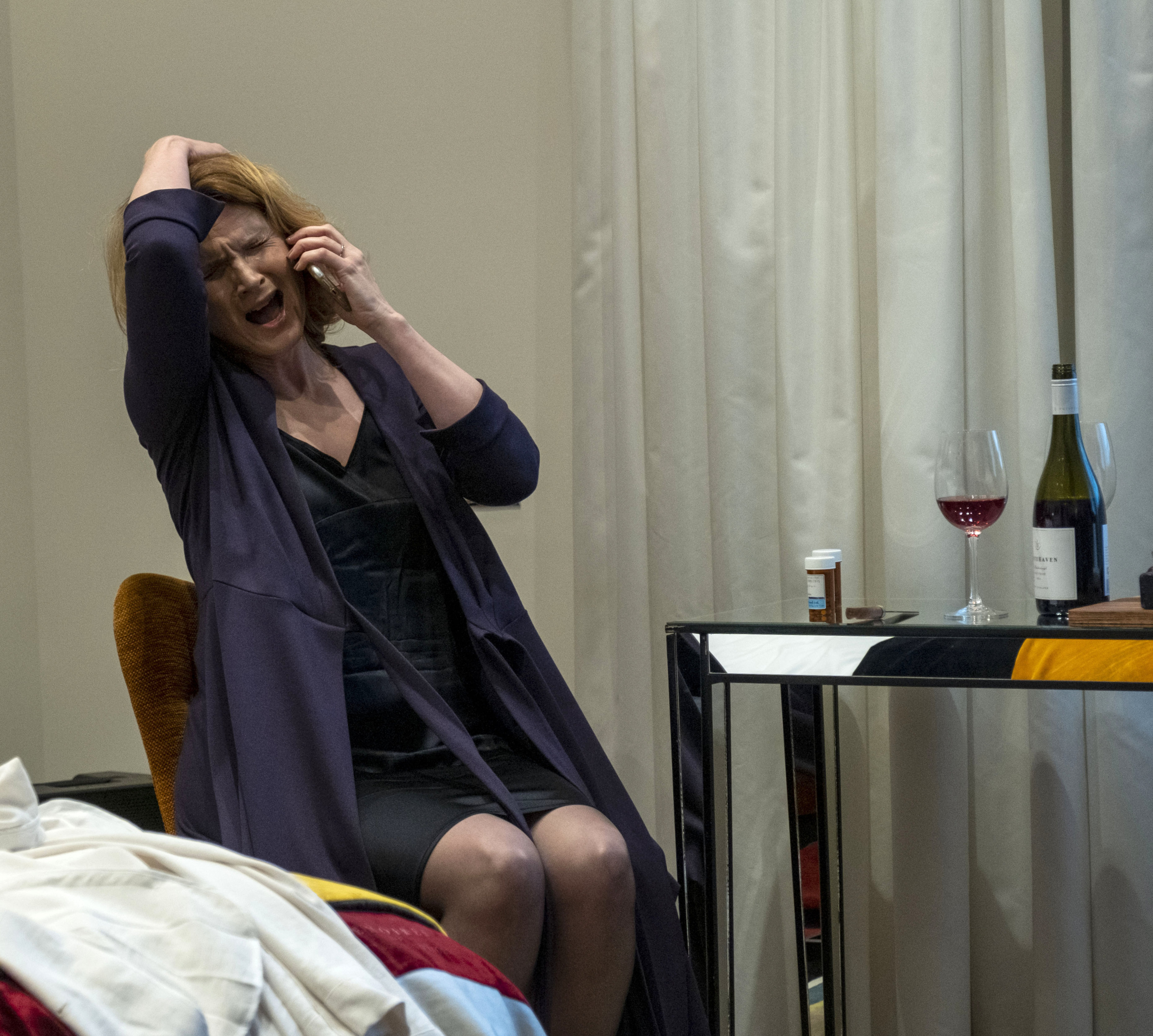
Fiona McAndrew in Burgess's 2020 production of Poulenc's The Human Voice (La voix humaine) for New Zealand Opera.

Burgess has worked extensively in opera for over 30 years, directing productions for the Royal Opera House Covent Garden, Wexford Festival Opera, the Canadian Opera Company, Malmö Opera, English Touring Opera, and Opera Ireland, amongst others. Some of the productions he has directed include:

- Elektra, Canadian Opera Company, 2007 (awarded Outstanding Production in Canada's Dora Mavor Moore Awards)
- Il Barbiere di Siviglia, Royal Opera House Covent Garden
- La Vestale, Wexford Festival Opera
- Dead Man Walking, Opera Ireland
- La Traviata, Malmö Opera
- Don Giovanni, English Touring Opera
- The Emperor of Atlantis, Lost & Found (staged in a synagogue)
- In the Shadow of Venus, Lost & Found, Perth Institute of Contemporary Arts
- Médée, Lost & Found, 2014, Fremantle Arts Centre (formerly a women's asylum)
- Don Procopio, Lost & Found, featuring Alasdair Kent (performed at an Italian Club and suburban wedding venue)
- Bajazet, Pinchgut Opera, 2015 (first Southern Hemisphere production)
- The Turn of the Screw, New Zealand Opera, 2019
- The Human Voice, New Zealand Opera, 2020 (performed in a hotel room)
- Eight Songs for a Mad King, New Zealand Opera, 2020 (performed in a boardroom)
- Semele, New Zealand Opera, 2020 (in Auckland's Holy Trinity Cathedral)

== Publications ==
- Burgess, Thomas de Mallet; Skilbeck, Nicholas (1999). The Singing and Acting Handbook: Games and Exercises for the Performer. London: Routledge. ISBN 0-4151-6658-6. — Burgess wrote the book after realising "that acting training for singers couldn’t be the same as for actors in spoken theatre, but that few training programmes at the time recognised this."
