= Vea Mafile'o =

Tongan director

- Born: November 9, 1981; Hamilton
- Occupation: Film director
- Spouse: Jeremiah Tauamiti
- Website: www.veamafileo.com

Vea Margaret Mafile'o (born November 9, 1981) is a Tongan film director.

Vea Mafile'o was born on November 9, 1981 in Hamilton, New Zealand, the daughter of Saia Mafile’o, a Tongan from Tongoleleka, and Fiona Henderson Mafileʻo, an English and Scottish woman brought to Tonga by Volunteer Service Abroad. She grew up on a dairy farm in Gordonton, New Zealand and attended Hillcrest High School and Manukau Institute of Technology.

Her short film Toa`ipuapuagā (Strength in Suffering, 2018) was filmed in Siufaga, Samoa and is about a woman named Toa who begins to display the stigmata. For My Father’s Kingdom (2019) is a documentary about her father, who goes into significant debt tithing to the Free Wesleyan Church of Tonga because of his desire to maintain a social, cultural, and spiritual connection to his community, and how his struggles affect his family and children. For My Father’s Kingdom was screened at the New Zealand International Film Festival in 2019. In the United States, For My Father’s Kingdom appeared on PBS in 2021 as part of the documentary series Pacific Heartbeat. Both Toa`ipuapuagā and For My Father’s Kingdom were screened at the NATIVe – A Journey into Indigenous Cinema program at the 69th Berlin International Film Festival in 2019.

Mafile'o served as one of the directors of The Panthers, a 2021 TVNZ miniseries about the Polynesian Panthers. She and co-director Tom Hern were nominationed for Best Drama Director at the 2022 New Zealand Television Awards. Her short film Lea Tupu'anga/Mother Tongue is about a Tongan speech therapist who exaggerates her fluency in Tongan to get a job and struggles to communicate with her patients. The film was inspired by the language insecurity of Luciane Buchanan, a Kiwi/Tongan actress who co-created the film. It premiered at the 2024 Sundance Film Festival.

She co-directed Lomu, a documentary about Jonah Lomu, a New Zealand rugby player of Tongan descent considered one of the greatest players of the sport. It premiered at the 2026 Dublin International Film Festival and was screened at the 2026 Sydney Film Festival.

== Personal life ==
Vea Mafile'o married Samoan filmmaker Jeremiah Tauamiti and they have three children.

== Filmography ==
- 'Aho'eitu, short film, 2015
- Toa`ipuapuagā (Strength in Suffering), short film, 2018
- For My Father’s Kingdom, 2019
- Lea Tupu'anga/Mother Tongue, short film, 2024
- I Am Not Your Dusky Maiden, short film, 2025
- Lomu, 2026
