= Kun by Agüero =

2025 television documentary series

Kun by Agüero (Kun por Agüero) is a documentary series about the life and career of Argentinian football player Sergio Agüero. It was released on Disney+ and Hulu on 7 May 2025. It features interviews with Manchester City F.C. manager Pep Guardiola and fellow Argentinian footballers Lionel Messi, Nicolás Otamendi, and Julián Alvarez. Directed by Justin Webster, the four-part series was an official selection at the 2025 Canneseries festival.
