= The Panthers (miniseries) =

New Zealand television series

- Genre: Drama
- Written by: James Napier Robertson; Halaifonua Finau; Tom Hern; Tom Dreaver; Fiona Samuel; Suli Moa
- Directed by: Miki Magasiva; Mario Faumui; Chris Graham; Tom Hern; Vea Mafile'o
- Starring: Dimitrius Schuster-Koloamatangi; Lealani Siaosi; Roy Billing; Beulah Koale; Frankie Adams; Chelsie Preston Crayford
- Composers: ChoiceVaughan; Jonathan Crayford; Diggy Dupe; Troy Kingi
- Country of origin: New Zealand
- Original language: English
- No. of series: 1
- No. of episodes: 6

Production
- Executive producers: Halaifonua Finau; Tom Hern; Kini Roy Earley; Will Ilolahia; James Napier Robertson
- Producers: Luciane Buchanan; Nicole Horan; Jaunnie Ilolahia; Crystal Vaega; Timēna Apa
- Cinematography: Andrew McGeorge
- Running time: 42-44 minutes
- Production companies: Tavake; Four Nights Films

Original release
- Network: TVNZ
- Release: 15 August – 15 August 2021

The Panthers is a New Zealand drama television miniseries created and executive produced by Halaifonua Finau and Tom Hern in association with Four Knights Film studio. Set during the 1970s, the series focuses on the emergence of the Polynesian Panthers against the backdrop of the controversial dawn raids. The series was released by public broadcaster TVNZ on 15 August on TVNZ 1 and TVNZ On Demand. The series starred Dimitrius Schuster-Koloamatangi as Polynesian Panthers leader Will Ilolahia, and was written by Tom Hern and Halaifonua Finau.

== Synopsis ==
Set in Auckland in 1974, The Panthers focuses on how a group of Polynesian students and street gangsters led by Tongan student Will 'Ilolahia formed a revolutionary movement called the Polynesian Panthers, drawing inspiration from the American Black Panther Party. The miniseries is set against the backdrop of racial tensions between European and Pasifika New Zealanders, the dawn raids on overstayers, and the premiership of Prime Minister Robert Muldoon.

== Cast and characters ==
- Dimitrius Schuster-Koloamatangi as Will 'Ilolahia
- Lealani Siaosi as Melani
- Roy Billing as Robert Muldoon
- Beulah Koale as "Ice"
- Frankie Adams as Tessa
- Chelsie Preston Crayford as Carolyn
- Jordan Mooney as Jimmy
- Jordan Vaha'Akolo as Havili
- Villa Junior Lemanu as Foof
- Rokalani Lavea as King Kong
- Haanz Fa'avae-Jackson as Fred
- Amanaki Prescott-Faletau as Lulu
- Phoenix Puleanga as Toa
- Tatum Warren-Ngata as Miriami
- Benedict Wall as John Freeman
- Simon Gilchrist as Political reporter
- Tom Hern as Geoffrey Peters
- Ryan O'Kane as Pawn shop shark

== Episodes ==
No.	Title	Directed by	Written by	Original release date	New Zealand viewers (millions)
1	"Tahi"	Miki Magasiva	James Napier Robertson, Halaifonua Finau	15 August 2021	N/A
In Auckland, Tongan medical and politics student Will 'Ilolahia and his friends are arrested and imprisoned after stealing a massive fish from a warehouse. While Will is released and bailed due to his parents petitioning Governor-General Denis Blundell, one of his friends is deported for overstaying his visa. Will's increasingly radical politics clashes with his conservative Christian parents, who want to maintain respectability. Meanwhile, Southland nurse Carolyn Davis and her family move to Ponsonby after her husband Jimmy takes up his first posting as a police officer. Carolyn and Jimmy encounter hostility from the local Pasifika community, who distrust the police. Will and his friends are involved in a riot where Jimmy is seriously wounded.
2	"Lua"	Miki Magasiva	Halaifonua Finau, Tom Hern, Tom Dreaver	15 August 2021	N/A
With the consent of the Mayor of Auckland City Dove-Myer Robinson, Will and his friends establish a political club called the Polynesian Panthers to advance the rights of Pasifika and Māori. Will's activities advocating for families facing eviction. In addition, Will also has to navigate his medical studies and debts to the gang leader "Ice." Meanwhile, Jimmy is co-opted by the National Party leader Robert Muldoon, who is running on a populist platform of law and order and also foments hostility against Pasifika immigrants. The Polynesian Panthers disrupt Muldoon's speech at the Auckland Town Hall.
3	"Tolu"	Tom Hern, Vea Mafile'o	Tom Hern, Halaifonua Finau, Fiona Samuel	15 August 2021	N/A
Will's radical politics brings him in conflict with his family, particularly his soldier brother and mother who regard his actions as embarrassing to their family. With the support of Melani, Will takes part in an interview with a journalist to promote the Polynesian Panthers' public image. The Tongan police officer Havila monitors Will and Tess, exposing their relationship to Will's mother and gets Tess arrested due to her overstayer status. Carolyn is wounded during an attempted abortion but is saved by her Pasifika neighbour. Unhappy with her new life in Auckland and determined to pursue her nursing career, Carolyn clashes with Jimmy.
4	"A"	Vea Mafile'o	Tom Hern	15 August 2021	N/A
With the help of lawyer David Lange, Melani and the Polynesian Panthers distribute legal aid booklets to help the Pasifika community deal with the Police, who are arresting members of their community on trumped-up charges of disorderly conduct and verbal assault. Meanwhile, Will travels to Australia where he connects with Aboriginal activists. Together, they topple a statue of Captain James Cook, leading to Will's deportation. As Muldoon and the National Party campaign against overstayers, Melani clashes with a racist talkback radio host. Following the attempted abortion, Carolyn separates from Jimmy, who mistakenly believes she is having an affair with Havila. While Carolyn supports a group seeking to decriminalise abortion in New Zealand, the Polynesian Panthers campaign on behalf of the Labour Party in opposition to Muldoon's anti-immigrant rhetoric. Despite their efforts, National wins the 1975 general election, defeating Prime Minister Bill Rowling. Will returns to find that his friend King Kong had been hospitalised following an assault by Ice's associates.
5	"Nima"	Chris Graham, Mario Faumui	Tom Hern, Halaifonua Finau, Suli Moa	15 August 2021	N/A
Under Muldoon's leadership, the Police begin questioning Pasifika people about their immigration status, catching some Maori and Niueans with residency rights. In response, the Polynesian Panthers mount their own Police Investigation Group (PIG) patrols. Will seeks justice for his friend Kong, petitioning Havila who reveals he is involved in an undercover operation investigating the criminal Ice. Jimmy's estrangement with Carolyn grows, affecting their children. Havila confronts Ice, brutally assaulting him. Believing Havila is dating Carolyn, Jimmy shoots him.
6	"Ono"	Chris Graham, Mario Faumui	Halaifonua Finau, Tom Hern	15 August 2021	N/A
With the Police facing opposition from the Panthers' PIG patrols, Muldoon authorises Dawn Raids against overstayers. After learning that the Police are disproportionately targeting Pasifika overstayers, the Panthers attempt to disrupt the arrest of overstaying workers. Taking the fight back, the Panthers mount dawn raids on the homes of government ministers Bill Birch and Frank Gill. This has the effect of turning public opinion against the Dawn Raids, forcing Muldoon to back down. Will reconciles with his fellow Panthers and family while recognising the Panthers' community services. Havila survives the shooting. Jimmy and Carolyn reconcile after Caroyln clarifies that she is not romantically involved with Havila.

== Production ==
The Polynesian Panther's script was written by Tom Hern and Halaifonua Finau, who also worked as executive producers. Other executive producers included James Napier Robertson, Polynesian Panthers' founder Will 'Ilolahia and Kini Roy Earley. Key cast members included Dimitrius Schuster-Koloamatangi as 'Ilolahia, Beulah Koale, Frankie Adams, Roy Billing as Robert Muldoon, Lealani Siaosi, Chelsie Preston Crayford, Jordan Mooney, Jordan Vaha'akolo, Villa Junior Lemanu, Rokalani Lavea and Ravikanth Gurunathan. The series also had a majority Pasifika cast.

The miniseries was produced by Hern and Finau’s production company Tavake, in association with Four Nights Films. Commissioned by TVNZ, it received NZ$5.5 million in funding and a platform contribution relief of NZ$336,000 from NZ On Air. Several musicians including Troy Kingi, Choicevaughan, and Diggy Dupé compiled a full-length album for the series' soundtrack. Some songs used in the series' soundtrack included First Take Strut, Keep your head up, Ulu Up, Donny Hathaway, Must Seem Popular, and All for Show.

== Release ==
A trailer for The Panthers was launched on 21 July 2021. The miniseries was released by public broadcaster TVNZ on 15 August on TVNZ 1 and TVNZ On Demand. To promote the series, TVNZ also released a documentary series called The Panthers Rapp: The Next Chapter, to provide historical context for the series.

The miniseries was screened at the 2021 Toronto International Film Festival's Primetime section in September 2021.

== Reception ==
Stuff reviewer James Croot described the series as "a well put-together dramatisation of a dark chapter in New Zealand chapter," praising director Miki Magasiva's production and costume design. While praising Schuster-Koloamatangi's performance as the main protagonist Will 'Ilolahia, Croot criticised the underdevelopment of some of the characters and described Roy Billing's portrayal of Prime Minister Muldoon as a "caricature of his later days in office, rather than the beginning."

The Spinoff's reviewer Dan Taipua praised the series for shining a "bold light" on the history of the Polynesian Panthers and the dawn raids in New Zealand. He also praised Billing for demystifying Muldoon as a simple-minded populist who exploited racism. In addition, Taipua praised the performances of Schuster-Koloamatangi, Frankie Adams and Beulah Koale. Taipua also compared The Panthers to other radical films and TV shows such as Spike Lee's BlackkKlansman and Shaka King's Judas and the Black Messiah.
