= Sergio Agüero =

Argentine footballer (born 1988)

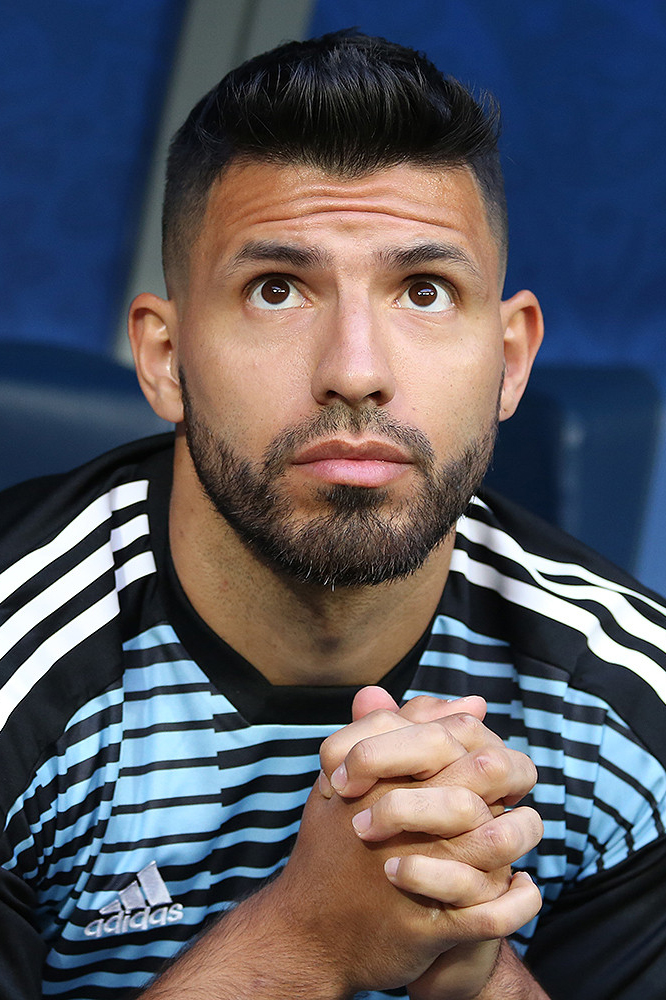
- Agüero with Argentina in 2018

Personal information
- Full name: Sergio Leonel Agüero del Castillo
- Date of birth: 2 June 1988 (age 38)
- Place of birth: Buenos Aires, Argentina
- Height: 1.73 m (5 ft 8 in)
- Position: Striker

Youth career
- Loma Alegre
- Los Primos
- 1997–2003: Independiente

Senior career*
Years	Team	Apps	(Gls)
2003–2006	Independiente	54	(23)
2006–2011	Atlético Madrid	175	(74)
2011–2021	Manchester City	275	(184)
2021	Barcelona	4	(1)
Total		508	(282)

International career
2004	Argentina U17	5	(3)
2005–2007	Argentina U20	11	(6)
2008	Argentina U23	5	(2)
2006–2021	Argentina	101	(41)
Medal record
Men's football
Representing Argentina
Copa América
Winner	2021 Brazil
Runner-up	2015 Chile
Runner-up	2016 United States
Third place	2019 Brazil
FIFA World Cup
Runner-up	2014 Brazil
Olympic Games
Gold medal – first place	2008 Beijing	Team
FIFA U-20 World Cup
Winner	2005 Netherlands	Team
Winner	2007 Canada	Team
- * Club domestic league appearances and goals

Sergio Leonel Agüero del Castillo (born 2 June 1988), also known as Kun Agüero, is an Argentine former professional footballer who played as a striker. He is regarded as one of the best strikers of his generation and one of the greatest players in the history of the Premier League. He played for Manchester City from 2011 to 2021 and is the club's all-time top goalscorer, also holding the record for most Premier League hat-tricks, with 12.

Agüero began his career at the Argentine club Independiente where, on 5 July 2003, he became the youngest player to play in the Argentine Primera División at 15 years and 35 days, breaking the 27 year record previously set by future father-in-law Diego Maradona. In 2006, Agüero moved to La Liga club Atlético Madrid in a transfer worth €23 million, establishing himself as one of the world's best young players. At the club, he won the UEFA Europa League and the UEFA Super Cup. Agüero signed for Manchester City in 2011 in a transfer for a reported fee of £35 million. He spent 10 years at the club, where he won five Premier League titles, notably scoring a last minute winner in the last league game of his debut season to win the club its first league title since 1968. Further honours with the club include a record six EFL Cups and an FA Cup; he was also part of the club's first UEFA Champions League final.

During his time in England, Agüero was awarded the Player of the Year by the FSF for the best player in the Premier League, won the Premier League Golden Boot, and was included in the PFA Team of the Year twice. He is the second highest non-English goalscorer in the Premier League, with 184 goals. He held the record for the most Premier League goals scored by a player for any single club until it was overtaken by Harry Kane in 2022. In 2021, he joined Barcelona on a free transfer, before retiring from football aged 33 due to heart problems in the same year. He played just four matches for the club, with his only goal coming in the first El Clásico of the 2021–22 season.

At international level, Agüero represented the Argentina under-20 team as they won the 2005 and 2007 FIFA U-20 World Cups. He played at the 2008 Olympics, scoring two goals in the semi-final against Brazil as Argentina won gold. Agüero is Argentina's fourth-highest all-time top goalscorer and earned over 100 caps, representing the senior team at three FIFA World Cups (in 2010, 2014, and 2018) and five Copas América (in 2011, 2015, 2016, 2019, and 2021), finishing as runner-up with his country at the 2014 World Cup and winning the Copa América in 2021.

== Club career ==
=== Independiente ===
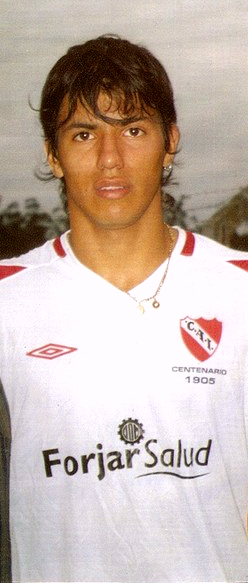
Agüero with Independiente in 2005

Sergio Agüero joined the youth system of Independiente at the age of nine. He started playing for the side, becoming the youngest player to debut in the first division at 15 years and 35 days (on 5 July 2003 against San Lorenzo), when Independiente's coach, Oscar Ruggeri sent Agüero onto the field as a substitute for Emanuel Rivas in the 69th minute of the match. His performance was well received by the press. Despite his early debut, he was not selected again by Ruggeri, and his replacement Osvaldo Sosa, for the remainder of 2002–03 season, having made only one appearance in the Torneo Clausura. Following the arrival of coach Jose Omar Pastoriza, seven months after Agüero's first match he returned to the club's first-team in 4–2 win against Peru's Cienciano during the group stages of the 2004 Copa Libertadores. This meant that he also became the youngest player to participate in the Copa Libertadores, a record that he held for three years. One month later, Agüero again featured in a Copa Libertadores fixture against Ecuador's El Nacional. On 19 June, for the first time, Agüero played a full 90-minute match for Independiente against Atlético de Rafaela during the Torneo Clausura. He scored his first goal for Independiente in a 2–2 draw against Estudiantes on 26 November, with a 22nd minute shot from outside the penalty area. Agüero became a regular in the club's first-team, being selected for the Argentina U-20 squad for the 2005 FIFA U-20 World Cup, which Argentina won.

During the 2005–06 season, Agüero scored 18 goals in 36 league appearances, having missed two games due to suspension. In a 4–0 win against Racing Club on 11 September, he dribbled from inside of his own half and scored Independiente's fourth goal with a left footed shot. His first red card came in the Torneo Apertura, after slapping an opponent in a match against Tiro Federal. His outstanding performances during the Torneo Apertura attracted interest from a number of large European clubs, and, after months of speculation, Agüero announced on TV in April that he intended to leave the club at the end of the season. Before the end of the season, there had already been speculation of a possible transfer to Atlético Madrid. With his performances being lauded by the press, there was talk of a possible call up for Agüero for the 2006 FIFA World Cup. In a 2–0 away victory against Olimpo de Bahia Blanca in round 17 of the Torneo Clausura, Agüero received his fifth yellow card of the season. This prevented him from playing his last game for Independiente in a fixture against Boca Juniors in Avellaneda one week later. The yellow card brought tears to his eyes, as television cameras recorded. Agüero, who scored Independiente's second goal of the match, later said: "I think that it was my last goal for Independiente". He played his last game for Independiente, two weeks later, in a 2–0 away defeat to Rosario Central. On 30 May, Agüero officially transferred to Atlético Madrid for €20 million, marking a record for the club.

=== Atlético Madrid ===
==== 2006–09: Transfer and fast rise to stardom ====
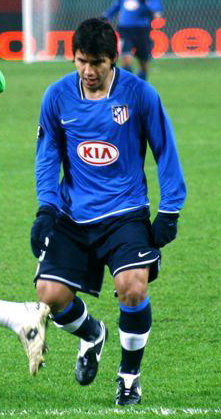
Agüero playing for Atlético Madrid in 2007

In May 2006, Agüero joined Spanish club Atlético Madrid for a fee reported to be around €20 million, breaking the club's previous transfer record. He caused controversy early in his Atlético career by using his hands to score the winning goal against Recreativo Huelva on 14 October 2006, only his second goal for the club, with the first coming in a 4–1 away win against Athletic Bilbao on 17 September. He ended his first season in Madrid with seven goals in all competitions, eased into European football by manager Javier Aguirre, who opted to bring him in and out of the line-up as Atlético finished seventh, enough to qualify for the UEFA Intertoto Cup.

Following the departure of strike partner Fernando Torres to Liverpool in the summer of 2007, Agüero secured his starting spot for the Rojiblancos and soon became arguably the team's most important player at the age of just 19. In the 2007–08 season, he finished third highest scorer in La Liga, behind Dani Güiza and Luís Fabiano, with 19 goals, and was runner up in the Trofeo Alfredo Di Stéfano award. Agüero won many plaudits for his man of the match display against Barcelona in March 2008, scoring twice, assisting a goal and winning a penalty for Atlético in a 4–2 win. He also scored important goals against the likes of Real Madrid, Valencia, Sevilla and Villarreal to help Atlético finish fourth and qualify for the UEFA Champions League for the first time in over ten years.

Agüero was once again a regular goalscorer for Atlético in the 2008–09 season, continuing to establish a lethal partnership with Uruguayan striker Diego Forlán, also a former Independiente player. On 16 September, he scored his first Champions League goals in a 3–0 away win at PSV Eindhoven, helping Atlético eventually reach the last 16 of the competition. In March 2009, Forlán and Agüero each scored a brace in a 4–3 win over league leaders Barcelona, the latter scoring the winning goal in the match's final minutes. With the help of more vital goals in a formidable end of the season run-in from his team, Agüero finished in the top ten contenders for the Pichichi Trophy, which was won by his teammate Forlán. Atlético finished fourth in the league, qualifying for the following season's Champions League.

==== 2009–11: UEFA Europa League win and departure ====
Despite not being as prolific in front of goal, Agüero had another good season in 2009–10, and was praised for his influential performances as Atlético enjoyed their most successful season in over a decade. On 3 November 2009, he scored twice against Chelsea during a 2–2 draw in the Champions League at the Vicente Calderón. Atlético were knocked out of the competition, but went on to reach the final of the 2009–10 UEFA Europa League, where Agüero assisted both goals in a 2–1 extra time win against English club Fulham. He also helped Atlético reach the final of the Copa del Rey, although this time they were not victorious, losing to Sevilla at the Camp Nou on 19 May.

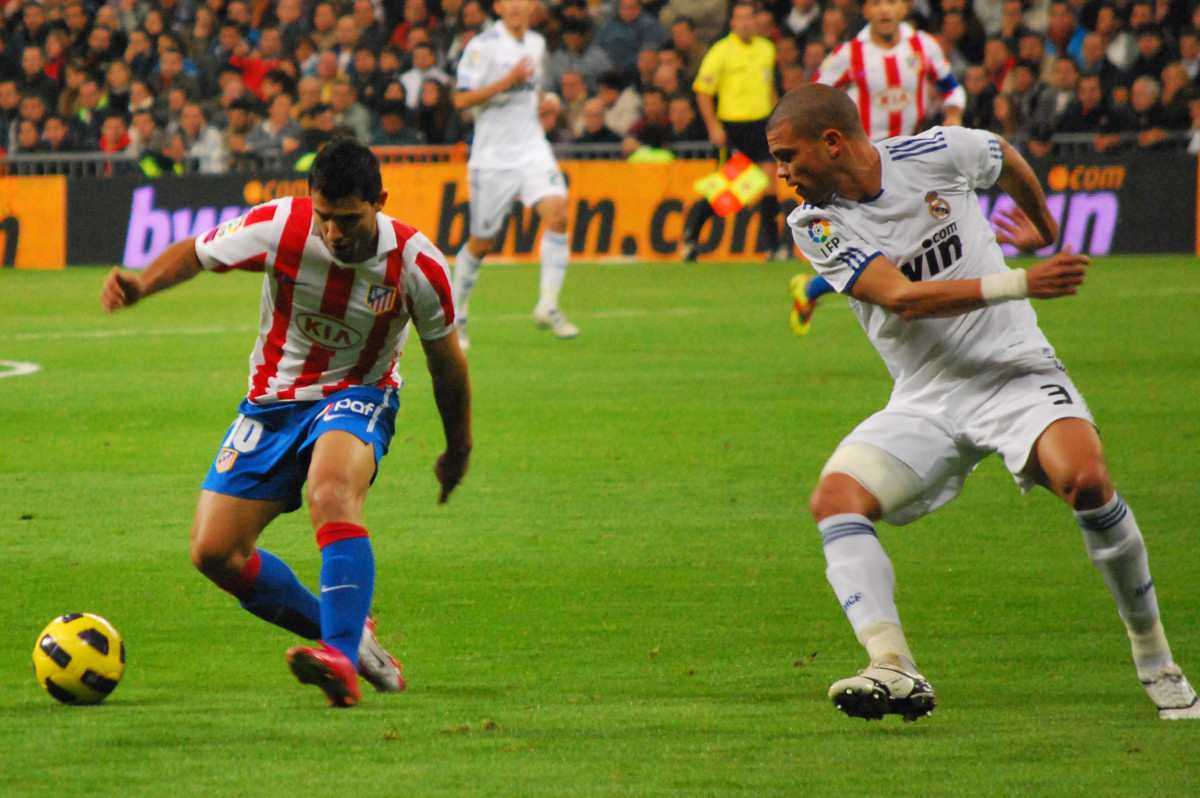
Agüero (left; pictured with Pepe) with Atlético Madrid during the 2010–11 season

On 27 August 2010, Atlético Madrid captured the UEFA Super Cup by beating favorites Inter Milan 2–0. Agüero provided the assist for José Antonio Reyes' opening goal and then secured the win by scoring the second. On 4 January 2011, Atlético Madrid confirmed via their official website that Agüero had signed a new contract which would keep him at the club until 2014. The following day, he was named as the new vice-captain of Atlético, along with strike partner Diego Forlán. The 2010–11 season was arguably Agüero's most successful for Atlético, as he scored 20 league goals for the first time in his career. Between March and May 2011, he went on a run of seven consecutive goalscoring appearances, a feat that no other player in Europe could match during the season. Agüero's final outing for Atlético came on 21 May against Mallorca, a game in which he reached two milestones. In a 4–3 win, he scored his first career hat-trick, the second goal being his 100th for the Colchoneros. Failure to celebrate any of the goals, however, led to speculation that he would be on his way out of the club.

On 23 May 2011, Agüero announced on his official website that he wanted to move from Atlético and formally asked to be released from his contract. Agüero later spoke to ESPN, where he stated that he would "not be returning to Atlético". On the same day that Agüero officially became a Manchester City player, Atlético hosted a 2011–12 Europa League qualifier against Strømsgodset, where a group of Atlético fans brandished "Agüero, We Hope You Die" banners in a reaction to the striker's transfer to City at the Vicente Calderón on 28 July 2011, after he had previously stated his desire to see out his contract with the club just weeks before requesting a transfer. Upon his departure, Atlético used the money from Agüero's sale to buy Radamel Falcao as his replacement.

=== Manchester City ===
==== 2011–12: Record transfer and Premier League win ====
On 28 July 2011, Manchester City confirmed that Agüero had signed a five-year contract with the club. The fee was reported to be in the region of £35 million. He was given the number 16 shirt for his first season at City and, as he did in Atlético, wore the name "Kun Agüero" on his shirt. He was an unused substitute in the Dublin Super Cup match against Inter Milan and the 2011 FA Community Shield against Manchester United with manager Roberto Mancini believing Agüero was not yet fit. Agüero made his debut for City on 15 August 2011 in a 4–0 Premier League victory over Swansea City. Agüero came on as a substitute in the 59th minute, scoring his first goal for the club within nine minutes after a tap-in from a cross from full back Micah Richards. He then turned provider with an assist after chipping over the oncoming goalkeeper before flicking the ball back into the penalty box and into the path of David Silva to score. Agüero rounded off his debut by scoring again in injury time with a 30-yard strike. His 30-minute debut gained rave reviews among football journalists, with some suggesting it was one of the best in English football.

City continued their strong start, winning 3–2 away at Bolton Wanderers with Agüero missing two chances in the penalty box. On 28 August, Agüero scored his third league goal in Manchester City's 5–1 rout of Tottenham Hotspur. On his third start for the club, he scored his first Premier League hat-trick, against Wigan Athletic. On 18 September, he scored twice at Craven Cottage against Fulham, but City were held to a 2–2 draw. Having been substituted after just 28 minutes due to an injury during a 4–0 win against Blackburn Rovers on 1 October, Agüero returned to action in a 2011–12 UEFA Champions League group stage fixture, where he came on for Nigel de Jong on 62 minutes and scored a 93rd-minute winner in his side's 2–1 victory against Villarreal on 18 October. On 23 October, Agüero took part in his first Manchester derby, scoring in the 69th minute as he converted a Micah Richards pass across the face of goal. The match finished 6–1 to City. On 1 November, Agüero was shortlisted for the prestigious FIFA Ballon d'Or. On 19 November, he scored a penalty in a 3–1 win at home to Newcastle United, ending Newcastle's unbeaten start to the season.

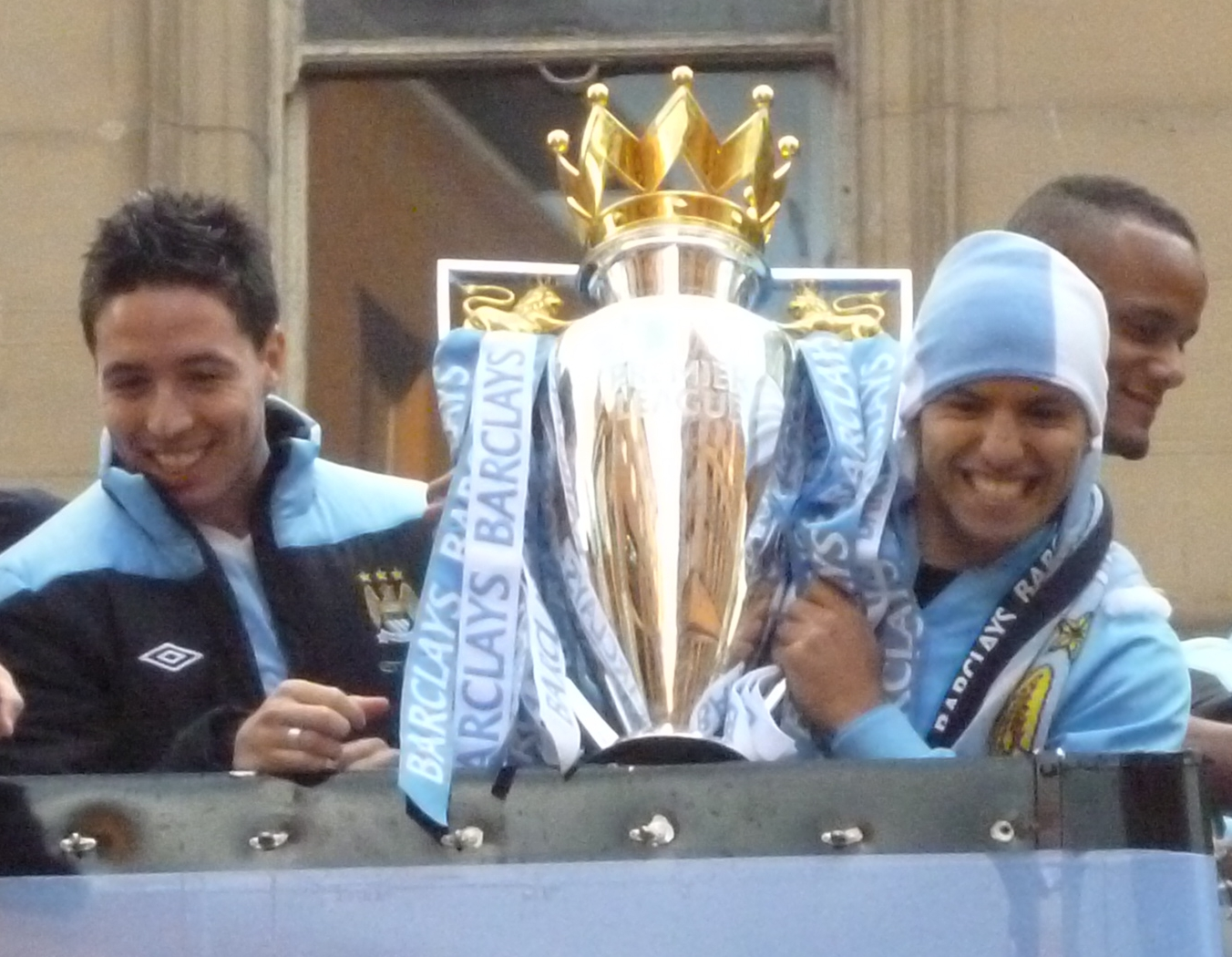
Agüero (right) and Samir Nasri parade the Premier League trophy, May 2012

Agüero made his League Cup debut in the quarter final match against Arsenal at the Emirates Stadium, scoring the only goal of the game in the 83rd minute from an Adam Johnson through-ball. His next goal came in a 5–1 home win against Norwich City, opening the scoring in the 32nd minute, giving him his 13th goal of the season and maintaining the team's 100% league record at home. On 21 December, he scored a brace as City beat Stoke City 3–0 at home. On 3 January 2012, he opened the scoring in a 3–0 win at home to Liverpool, beating Pepe Reina with a low shot. Agüero scored his 15th goal on 4 February, scoring a penalty against Fulham in a 3–0 win at a snow-covered City of Manchester Stadium.

During the first-leg of a Europa League round of 32 match against Porto, Agüero entered the field in the 78th minute for Mario Balotelli and scored the match-winning goal, and his first Europa League goal for Manchester City, in the 85th minute. The game ended 2–1, and, in the second-leg, Agüero scored within 19 seconds in a 4–0 win on 22 February. Manchester City advanced to the last 16 of the 2011–12 UEFA Europa League, having won 6–1 on aggregate. On 25 February, Agüero scored his 16th league goal in a 3–0 win against Blackburn. During the second-leg of Manchester City's Round of 16 Europa League fixture against Sporting CP on 15 March, Agüero netted a double to help City claim a 3–2 win, having been trailing 2–0 at half-time, to level the scores at 3–3 on aggregate. Sporting CP won on away goals, as they defeated Manchester City 1–0 in the first-leg on 8 March. One week later, Agüero scored his 17th league goal in 2–1 win against Chelsea on 21 March. On 29 March, Agüero was ruled out for 10 days to two weeks due to a foot problem, which was later diagnosed as a reaction to a substance that blistered his foot.

On 11 April, Agüero scored two goals for himself and also set up another two goals (for David Silva and Carlos Tevez) in a 4–0 home victory against West Bromwich Albion. On 14 April, Agüero scored a double in a 6–1 away win against Norwich City, his two goals meaning that he had surpassed 20 league goals in the Premier League. He scored one goal in the next match, in which Manchester City beat Wolverhampton Wanderers 2–0. On 4 May, Agüero was named Manchester City Player of The Year. His first goal in the 6–1 away win against Norwich also won him the club's Goal of the Season award.

==== Final game of the season ====
"In my career so far it's the most important goal. You score the goal in the last minute to win the title. You're not sure if that's ever going to happen in your career again. I wish I could tell you how I did it but I can't. I thought for all the world that Mario [Balotelli] was going to have a go himself but he just moved it on one more and it fell at my feet and I just thought: 'Hit the target, hit it as hard as you can and hit the target.' And it went in."

— Sergio Agüero, on his last-minute goal against Queens Park Rangers in 2012 which won the Premier League for City.

Five straight wins helped City erase an eight-point deficit against Manchester United and they went into the final day's fixtures leading on goal difference. Facing relegation-threatened Queens Park Rangers, City needed to match or better United's result at Sunderland. By the 66th minute, QPR's Joey Barton was sent off after elbowing Agüero's teammate Carlos Tevez in the face. After being shown the red card, Barton proceeded to kick Agüero's knee, then attempted to attack Vincent Kompany, only for him to be held back by Micah Richards. Despite that, QPR still went ahead 2–1 against City, while United were 1–0 up against Sunderland.

In response, manager Roberto Mancini sent on strikers Edin Džeko and Mario Balotelli in an attempt to get the two goals City now needed for the title. Five minutes of injury time began for City with their and United's match scores unchanged. Džeko equalised to give City a glimmer of hope and United finished their own game with a 1–0 victory. In the 94th minute, Agüero, receiving the ball from Balotelli, drove into the penalty area and placed a powerful low shot into the corner of the goal, clinching their first top flight English title for Manchester City since 1968. Agüero's goal sent the City of Manchester Stadium into a frenzy and he was dragged to the floor jubilantly by his City teammates. Vincent Kompany recalled that Agüero was crying on the floor, and when asked if he cried during the Manchester City parade the following day, Agüero stated: "Yeah, a little".

==== 2012–13: Injuries and league runner-up ====
Agüero started the 2012–13 season in the 2012 FA Community Shield against Chelsea at Villa Park as Manchester City won 3–2. In Manchester City's first league match, Agüero had to be stretchered off in the 13th minute of their home game against Southampton due to a knee injury. Agüero was an unused substitute in City's 3–2 defeat to Real Madrid on 18 September 2012. Following the match, Agüero said he would have joined Real Madrid had they made an offer for him in 2011 but was left with "no option but to join City". Agüero made his return in a 1–1 home draw against Arsenal in the Premier League and went on to score his first goal of the season against Fulham on 29 September in a 2–1 away win in the Premier League. He followed this up with another goal the following weekend against Sunderland in a 3–0 home win. His next league goal came in a 2–1 win at home against Tottenham on 11 November. He followed this up with another two goals the following weekend against Aston Villa in a 5–0 win at home. Agüero also scored in back-to-back games in the Champions League in successive draws at home to Ajax and Real Madrid. He scored his next goal on 15 December, where he scored the opening goal, as Manchester City won 3–1 away against Newcastle. Agüero then scored against Norwich City on 29 December in a 4–3 away win. In his next match on 2 January, after scoring a penalty in the 73rd minute, Agüero damaged his hamstring during a 3–0 victory over Stoke.

Agüero made his return for Manchester City on 19 January after coming on as an 81st-minute substitute in a 2–0 victory against Fulham. On 3 February, Agüero scored the equaliser after beating Liverpool goalkeeper Pepe Reina in a race to the ball out near the right corner flag. On 17 February, Agüero helped Manchester City to the quarter-finals of the FA Cup as he scored twice in a 4–0 win at home to Leeds United. He sustained a knee injury in the 2–0 win over Chelsea on 24 February. This eventually led to him missing the Argentina squad for the 2014 FIFA World Cup qualification matches against Venezuela and Bolivia. Agüero made his return for Manchester City on 30 March after coming on as a substitute with warm reception in a 4–0 victory against Newcastle.

On 8 April, Agüero scored a solo goal to give City the win in the Manchester derby in the 78th minute, seven minutes after coming on as a substitute for Samir Nasri. Agüero then scored a header to help Manchester City defeat Chelsea on 14 April in the FA Cup semi-final and reach the final. In the 82nd minute of the tie, Agüero made a two-footed tackle on David Luiz after the defender had previously appeared to tackle him. Despite the incident warranting a red card at the time, the FA announced Agüero would not be punished following confirmation that referee Chris Foy had at least seen part of the incident and acted on it during the match. Many people disagreed with this decision and felt that the FA had failed to act. On 17 April, Agüero revealed that he had apologised to David Luiz for his rash challenge on the defender. Agüero withdrew as a precaution at half-time on 17 April in Manchester City's 1–0 home victory over Wigan after feeling tightness in a hamstring, but he appeared as an unused substitute in City's 3–1 away loss at White Hart Lane against Tottenham on 21 April. He scored his next goal on 27 April, where he scored the opening goal, as Manchester City won 2–1 home against West Ham United. On 11 May, Agüero started for Manchester City in the 2013 FA Cup Final, where the team lost 1–0 to Wigan. Agüero scored his final goal of the season in a 2–0 away win against Reading on 14 May.

The Times reported that he was the main transfer target of Spanish giants Real Madrid, but Agüero responded by saying, "I'm very happy at City and I feel appreciated and loved here which means a lot to me." Manchester City chief executive Ferran Soriano also negated the idea of a transfer, insisting Agüero would stay at the City of Manchester Stadium. However, former Argentina international Diego Maradona backed him to join Real Madrid, believing Agüero's presence in the Madrid team could help get even more out of Cristiano Ronaldo. On 25 May 2013, Agüero signed a one-year extension to his contract, keeping him at Manchester City until 2017. Agüero stated his commitment to Manchester City on 28 May 2013, saying: "I'm committed to Manchester City, it's a great club."

==== 2013–14: Second Premier League win ====
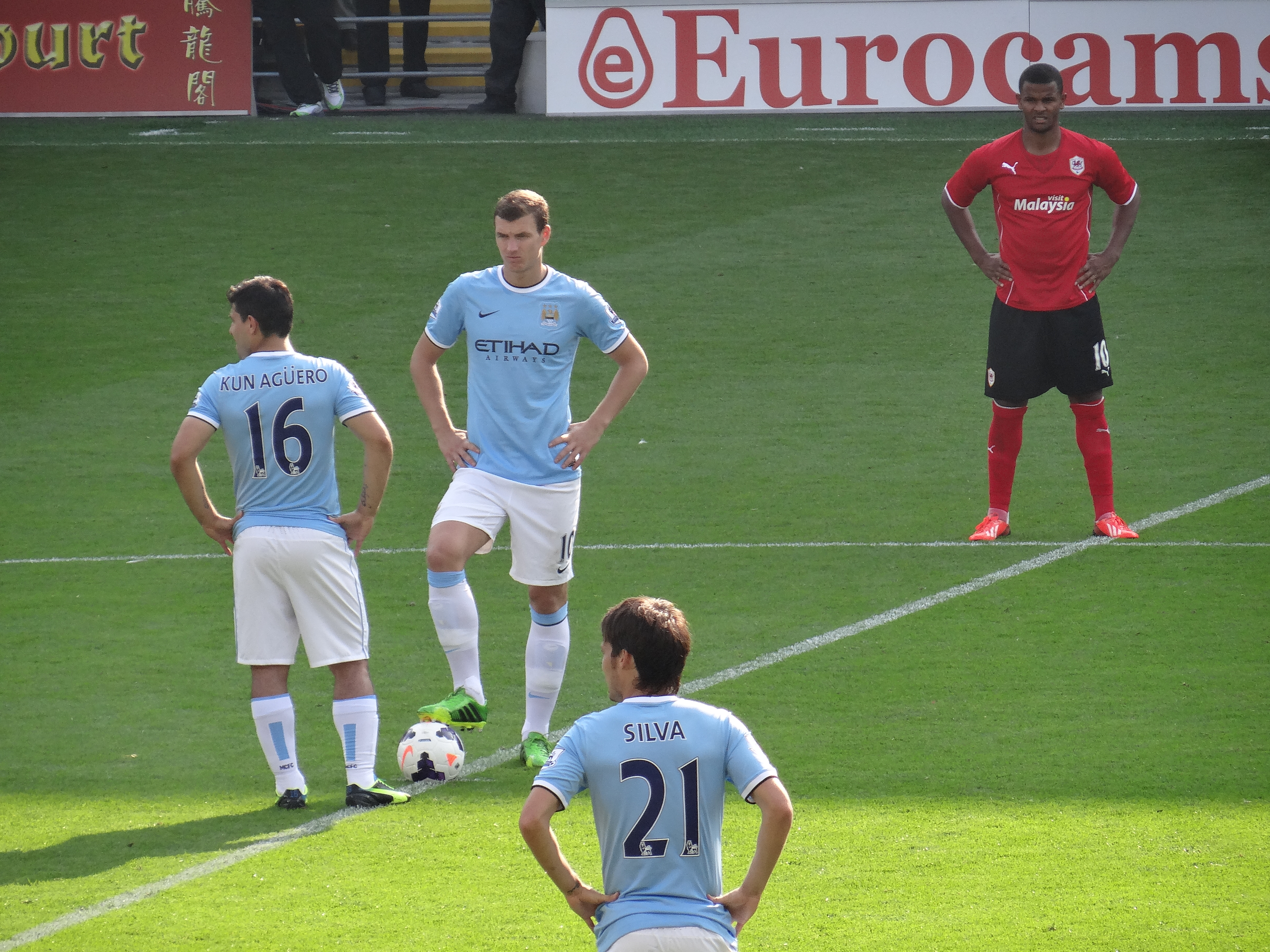
Agüero and Edin Džeko about to kick off against Cardiff City in 2013

Following a knee injury that ruled him out of all of the club's pre-season games, Agüero scored in City's 4–0 victory over Newcastle United in the opening game of the 2013–14 Premier League season. On 22 September 2013, he scored a brace in a 4–1 home win against Manchester United. On 8 November, after scoring five goals in four matches between 5 October and 2 November, Agüero was awarded the Premier League Player of the Month for the first time. During the same period, he had also scored both goals for City in a 2–1 away win against CSKA Moscow in the Champions League. He scored six goals in five matches in the Champions League group stage as Manchester City qualified for the knockout phase for the first time.

On 14 December 2013, Agüero was substituted in a 6–3 win against Arsenal due to a calf injury and missed eight matches. On 16 January 2014, he returned from injury in an FA Cup third-round replay against Blackburn Rovers, scoring after coming on as a substitute in the 5–0 win. In the next round of the competition, he scored his first hat-trick of the season in a 4–2 victory over Watford. On 29 January, he scored his 50th Premier League goal in a 5–1 victory at Tottenham but was substituted with a hamstring injury. On 2 March, Agüero returned to the City team for the 2014 Football League Cup Final, where they beat Sunderland 3–1 at Wembley. In his third appearance since returning from the hamstring problem, Agüero suffered a recurrence of the injury and was withdrawn at half-time in a 2–1 Champions League loss at Camp Nou against Barcelona. He missed the team's next five league matches, before returning to the starting line-up in a 3–2 loss against Liverpool at Anfield on 13 April. On 21 April, Agüero scored his first goal since January in a 3–1 defeat of West Bromwich Albion at the City of Manchester Stadium. After scoring his final goal of the season in a 3–2 win over Everton at Goodison Park on 3 May, Agüero started for Manchester City against West Ham as the team secured its second Premier League title in three seasons with a 2–0 win.

==== 2014–16: League top goalscorer and individual success ====
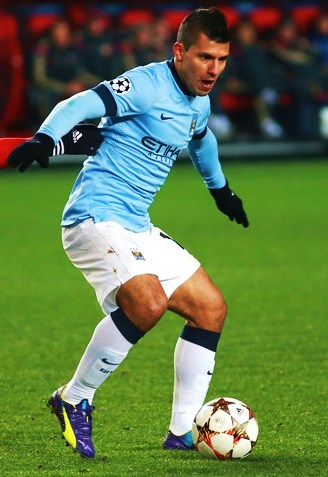
Agüero playing against CSKA Moscow in 2014

On 14 August 2014, Agüero signed a new five-year contract to keep him at City until 2019. Agüero scored his first goal of 2014–15 while appearing as an 83rd-minute substitute for Edin Džeko in City's opening match of the Premier League season against Newcastle on 17 August. Due to his late return from the World Cup, Agüero was again used as a substitute in the second game of the season against Liverpool, but, after replacing Džeko, took just 23 seconds to score City's third goal in the 3–1 win. On 18 October, he scored all four of City's goals in a 4–1 home win over Tottenham, two of which were penalties; he took another penalty in the match, but it was saved by Hugo Lloris. This took Agüero to 61 Premier League goals for the club, surpassing Carlos Tevez as the club's record scorer in the competition. He was the first player in the season to reach ten Premier League goals, doing so with the only goal in the Manchester derby on 2 November.

Aguero is every bit as important to them as Luis Suárez was to Liverpool last year or Gareth Bale to Tottenham Hotspur the year before.

— English football journalist Martin Samuel after City's win over Bayern Munich.

Agüero scored a hat-trick in City's 3–2 win over Bayern Munich in the Champions League group stage on 25 November, starting with a penalty which he won himself. Five days later, in his 100th Premier League match, he was wrongly booked for simulation by referee Mike Jones after being fouled by José Fonte in the penalty area, although City went on to defeat Southampton 3–0. On 2 December, Agüero was named the Football Supporters' Federation Player of the Year for 2014. He was also awarded Premier League Player of the Month for November 2014, a month in which he scored three league goals and assisted two more.

Agüero sustained a knee injury in the second minute of Manchester City's 1–0 win over Everton on 6 December and was unable to appear again for the remainder of 2014. He returned to City's matchday squad for the return fixture with Everton at Goodison Park on 10 January 2015 and appeared as a 67th-minute substitute in the 1–1 draw. On 11 February, he scored his first two goals of 2015 in a 4–1 win at Stoke City. On 21 February 72 seconds into a match against Newcastle United, Agüero scored the fastest penalty kick in the Premier League since 1994. On 12 April, Agüero scored twice in a 4–2 derby loss to Manchester United at Old Trafford. His second goal of the match took him to 100 goals for City in all competitions. On 19 April, he scored his 20th league goal of the season in a 2–0 home win against West Ham United. He passed 30 goals for the season with a hat-trick in a 6–0 home win over Queens Park Rangers on 9 May, relegating the opponents. On 24 May, in City's final match of the season against Southampton, Agüero scored his 26th league goal of the season, ending 2014–15 with the Premier League Golden Boot.

On 7 August 2015, Agüero announced he would be switching from his number 16 shirt to the number 10 shirt, previously worn by teammate Edin Džeko. Nine days later, he opened the scoring in a 3–0 home victory over reigning champions Chelsea. During City's 2–0 victory away at Everton on 23 August, Agüero halted the game after noticing that an Everton supporter was in need of emergency treatment. The striker alerted the referee and the other players and made sure that the man received attention from the medics. On 30 September, Agüero earned and converted a last-minute penalty to give City a 2–1 win at Borussia Mönchengladbach in the Champions League group stage. On 3 October, Agüero scored five goals against Newcastle in a 6–1 comeback win, joining Andy Cole, Alan Shearer, Jermain Defoe and Dimitar Berbatov in scoring as many in a Premier League game. His five goals within 23 minutes of game time made it the fastest five-goal haul since the Premier League started in 1992. Four minutes after scoring his fifth goal in the 62nd minute, Agüero was substituted by manager Manuel Pellegrini, as he had been receiving treatment due to a leg injury at half time.

On 8 October, in a 2018 World Cup qualifying match against Ecuador, Agüero sustained a hamstring injury early on and was carried off the pitch in tears. Agüero himself said he expected to be out for around four weeks (in which the derby against Manchester United was to be played), although several media outlets later claimed the injury would last for eight weeks. He returned on 21 November, scoring in a 1–4 home loss to Liverpool; this was his 85th Premier League goal, making him the top-scoring South American of all time in the division, ahead of his compatriot and former strike partner Carlos Tevez. On 16 April 2016, Agüero scored a hat-trick in a 3–0 win at Chelsea, ending with a penalty kick. He became the third visiting player to score a Premier League hat-trick at Stamford Bridge, and the fifth player to have three 20-goal seasons in the division. Three days later, he scored his 100th Premier League goal in a 1–1 draw at Newcastle. He reached the century in 147 games, second only to Alan Shearer who did so in 124. The goal was also his sixth against Newcastle for the season, making him just the sixth player in the Premier League era to have scored six goals against the same club in a single campaign. Agüero ended the 2015–16 Premier League season with 24 goals, one behind Golden Boot winner Harry Kane and level with Jamie Vardy. However, with his goals coming from 30 appearances, Agüero recorded the league's best goals to minute ratio.

==== 2016–20: All-time club top scorer, sustained domestic success ====
On 13 August 2016, Agüero scored Manchester City's first competitive goal under the management of Pep Guardiola in a 2–1 victory against Sunderland on the opening day of the 2016–17 Premier League season. In a league match against West Ham on 28 August, Agüero struck opponent Winston Reid in the throat with his arm, an incident which went unpunished by the referee. Reid lost his voice with the strike, and had to be substituted. The FA gave Agüero a three-match ban for violent conduct, accusing him of behaving in an "aggressive manner that was excessive in force and brutal". On 5 November, Agüero scored his 150th goal for Manchester City in a 1–1 draw against Middlesbrough in the league. Agüero was sent off in a 1–3 loss to Chelsea on 3 December for a tackle on David Luiz and was given a four-match suspension.

"He's a legend, and it's a part of history in the club. Aguero's numbers speak for themselves – he is amazing."

— Manchester City Manager Pep Guardiola on Agüero after he scored a hat-trick against Watford, putting him two goals away from becoming club record scorer.

Having scored on Manchester City's opening fixture of the season against Brighton & Hove Albion on 12 August 2017, Agüero scored his second goal of the season against Liverpool in a 5–0 win on 9 September. This was his 124th Premier League goal, and saw him overtake Trinidadian Dwight Yorke as the top-scoring non-European in the competition's history. One week later, Agüero scored his sixth Premier League hat-trick in a 6–0 win at Watford to put Manchester City top of the league. On 28 September, he was involved in a road accident after attending a Maluma concert in Amsterdam, when his taxi crashed into a lamppost. He was left with a fractured rib and ruled out for two weeks.

On 21 October, Agüero scored his 177th goal for Manchester City in a 3–0 win over Burnley, equalling the record set by Eric Brook. This was also the Citizens 11th straight win, equalling another club record. He scored his record 178th goal for the team on 1 November away at Napoli in a Champions League group game, a 4–2 win that sent his team through to the knockout stages of the competition. On 20 January 2018, Agüero scored a perfect hat-trick, his second of the season, against Newcastle in a 3–1 win with his second goal being the landmark 350th goal of his career. He was later awarded the Premier League Player of the Month for January, claiming the award for the fifth time in his career. On 10 February, Agüero scored four goals in a 5–1 Premier League home thrashing of Leicester City, claiming his third hat-trick of the season. He opened the scoring in the 2018 EFL Cup Final on 25 February, by chipping Arsenal's David Ospina in a 1vs1 situation, ultimately helping City secure a convincing 3–0 victory at Wembley Stadium.

In City's first game of the 2018–19 season, Agüero scored both goals in the 2–0 2018 FA Community Shield victory over Chelsea, the first goal being his 200th for the club. On 19 August 2018, Agüero scored his 9th Premier League hat-trick in a 6–1 home victory against Huddersfield Town, putting him behind only Alan Shearer's 11. He also leapfrogged Robin van Persie to enter the league's top ten scorers of all time, and second place in foreign Premier League scorers only to Thierry Henry's 175. Agüero hit the post twice in a 1–1 away draw against Wolverhampton Wanderers. On 21 September, Manchester City confirmed via their official website that Agüero had signed a new contract with the club which would keep him at the club until 2021. On 22 September, in his 300th appearance for Manchester City, Agüero scored the opening goal in an eventual 5–0 away win over Cardiff City.

On 4 November, Agüero scored his 150th Premier League goal in a 6–1 home win over Southampton in his 217th Premier League appearance; he became only the ninth player in history to achieve this landmark, and only the third player after Henry and Wayne Rooney to do so for one club. He was also the second-fastest player to reach this milestone, after Shearer, who took five fewer appearances. On 11 November, Agüero scored the second goal in a 3–1 win against Manchester United, making him the joint highest scorer in Manchester derbies in the Premier League era, level with Rooney. On 29 January 2019, Agüero scored after 24 seconds in an eventual 2–1 defeat at Newcastle United. On 3 February, he scored a hat-trick against Arsenal, including a goal after 48 seconds, bringing his Premier League tally of hat-tricks to ten, in a 3–1 win at the Etihad Stadium. On 10 February, Agüero scored his 11th Premier League hat-trick, as City defeated rivals Chelsea 6–0 at home; with this feat, he equalled Shearer's record of 11 in the competition. The hat trick also saw him overtake Tommy Johnson's and Eric Brook's record of 158 league goals for the club, and set a new record of 160 goals. The following month, he scored twice in a 7–0 (10–2 aggregate) Champions League win over Schalke 04 and in doing so helped the club equal the record for the largest winning margin in the knockout-phase of the competition.

On 10 August 2019, Agüero came on as a substitute replacing Gabriel Jesus, in a match that was dominated by the newly introduced VAR, at the London Stadium against West Ham United. With City 3–0 up, they were awarded a penalty for a foul on Riyad Mahrez. Agüero took the penalty and it was saved by opposing keeper Łukasz Fabiański. However, VAR stepped in and re-awarded the penalty for an infringement by Declan Rice. Agüero scored the re-awarded penalty in an eventual 5–0 away opening day win for the Citizens to start their Premier League title defence. On 12 January 2020, Agüero scored 12th hattrick of his Premier League career against Aston Villa in 6–1 away victory at Villa Park, taking his individual tally past Henry's 175 goal mark. Agüero scored the 399th and 400th goals of his professional career in a 3–1 away win over AFC Bournemouth on 25 August.

==== 2020–21: Final season, European finalist ====
After several weeks on the sidelines due to a meniscus injury, Agüero returned to action on 17 October 2020 in a 1–0 victory against Arsenal at the Etihad Stadium. On 21 October, he scored his first goal of the season in a 3–1 win over Porto in the 2020–21 UEFA Champions League. On 13 March 2021, Agüero scored his first league goal since January 2020 in a 3–0 away win against Fulham. On 29 March 2021, City announced that Agüero would leave the club at the end of the season following the expiry of his contract. On 23 May, on his final league appearance for the club, Agüero came off the bench to score twice in an eventual 5–0 home win over Everton, as City celebrated their Premier League title victory on the last matchday of the season; his brace saw him reach 184 league goals in 275 appearances, breaking Wayne Rooney's record for most Premier League goals for a single club. On 29 May, he played his last match for the club after he came on as substitute in the second half, in a 1–0 loss against Chelsea in the Champions League final, where he was seen crying at the end, having failed to win the Champions League in his final game with City. In total, Agüero managed 260 goals for City in 390 appearances.

=== Barcelona and retirement ===
I am proud or happy for my career. Since I was five years old, I have dreamed of playing soccer, being in the First Division [in Argentina], I never thought of arriving in Europe. Thanks Independiente, Atlético de Madrid, who bet on me when I was 18 years old, the people of City, who already know how I feel, I have left the best. To Barça, it has been incredible, I knew that I was coming to one of the best clubs in the world, but things happen for a reason. And to the Argentina national team, which is what I love the most.

— Sergio Agüero upon retiring

On 31 May 2021, Agüero agreed to sign for La Liga club Barcelona on a two-year contract starting 1 July, with a buyout clause set at €100 million.

On 17 October, he debuted as a substitute in a 3–1 home victory against Valencia. In his first El Clásico appearance on 24 October, Agüero came on as a substitute in the 77th minute, scoring his first goal for the club in the last minute of play of a 2–1 home defeat to Real Madrid. One week later, he was taken to hospital with chest discomfort diagnosed as cardiac arrhythmia during an eventual 1–1 home draw against Alavés. It was reported in November that he would be out of action for at least three months, but on 15 December, Agüero announced his retirement from football on the advice of doctors, and thanked the teams he had played for.

== International career ==
=== Youth teams ===
Agüero was selected for the Argentina U17 team to participate at the 2004 U-16 South American Championship in Paraguay in September. He participated in all of Argentina's group stage matches, scoring in a 2–1 win against the United States and a 3–1 win against Ecuador to help Argentina finish top of their group. Agüero scored in the 47th minute of Argentina's 1–0 quarter-final victory against Peru, setting up a semi-final match against Colombia which Argentina lost 2–0.

Agüero represented Argentina at two FIFA World Youth Championships, winning back-to-back world titles. He was part of the team that won the 2005 edition in the Netherlands, alongside his future 2008 Olympics squad teammates Fernando Gago and Lionel Messi. At the 2007 FIFA U-20 World Cup, held in Canada, Agüero scored twice and helped set up three goals in a 6–0 win over Panama in the second game of the group stage of the tournament. He then scored the only goal in Argentina's third match against North Korea from a free kick. Having qualified to the round of 16, he scored two of the three goals against Poland that would eventually give them a 3–1 win to advance to the next round. Argentina defeated Mexico in the quarter-finals and Chile in the semi-finals, and faced the Czech Republic in the final, a team they drew 0–0 in the group stage. Agüero captained and scored the equaliser in the 62nd minute, leading to a 2–1 victory. In addition, Agüero won the Golden Boot of the tournament, scoring six goals in seven, and the Golden Ball as the best player of the tournament.

As a member of the Argentine squad for the 2008 Beijing Olympics, Agüero scored two goals in the space of five minutes in the semi-final 3–0 win over Brazil on 19 August 2008. Argentina went on to win its second consecutive gold medal at the Olympic tournament.

=== Senior team ===
==== Debut, 2010 World Cup and 2011 Copa América ====
At age 18, Agüero debuted for the Argentine senior squad in a friendly match against Brazil on 3 September 2006, played at Emirates Stadium, England. One year later, he scored his first international goal in a 2010 FIFA World Cup qualification match against Bolivia, and went on to score three more times as the Albiceleste successfully qualified for the finals in South Africa.

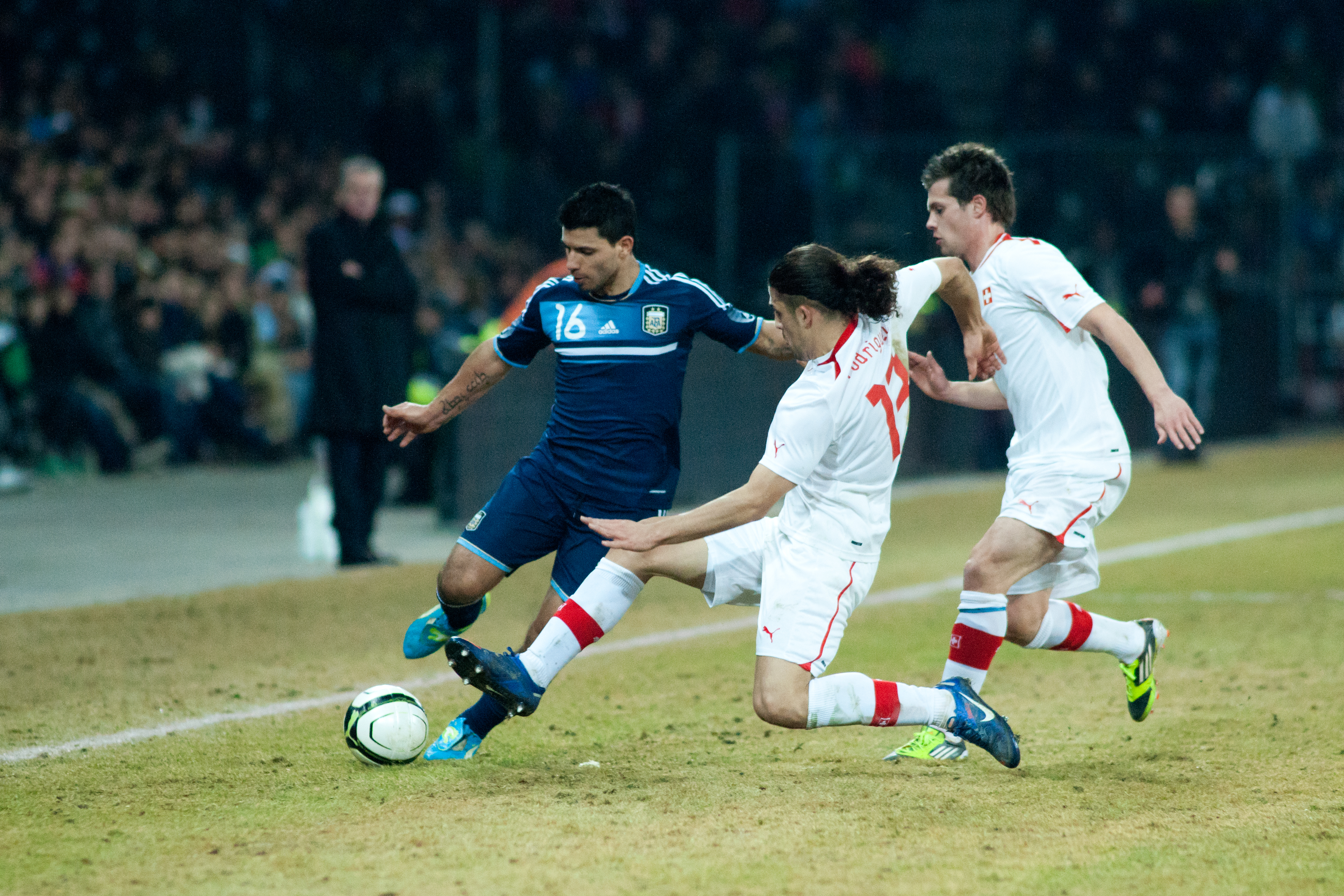
Agüero taking on two Swiss players in an international friendly in 2012

Agüero was named in the 23-man squad for the 2011 Copa América where Argentina had been drawn into Group A with Bolivia, Colombia, and Costa Rica. On 1 July, in Argentina's opening group stage match against Bolivia, he came on for Ezequiel Lavezzi on 71 minutes and scored an equaliser on 76 minutes to secure a 1–1 draw. On 11 July, in Argentina's third group stage match against Costa Rica, Agüero scored a goal in each half as Argentina won 3–0 and finished in second position in their group.

==== 2014 World Cup, and 2015 and 2016 Copas América ====
Agüero was named in Argentina's 23-man squad for the 2014 FIFA World Cup. On 15 June, he started alongside Lionel Messi as a forward in Argentina's 2–1 win against Bosnia and Herzegovina at the Estádio do Maracanã.

Agüero was named in the Argentine squad for the 2015 Copa América, and in a warm-up game on 7 June against Bolivia in San Juan, he scored his first international hat-trick in a 5–0 victory. On 13 June, he scored Argentina's opening goal of the tournament in a 2–2 group stage draw with Paraguay. Three days later at the same ground, he headed a cross from Manchester City teammate Pablo Zabaleta for a 1–0 win against holders Uruguay. At the semi-final stage, Agüero headed in Ángel Di María's cross as Argentina defeated Paraguay 6–1 to reach the 2015 Copa América Final. Agüero started the final against Chile, but was replaced in the 74th minute for Gonzalo Higuaín in an eventual penalty shootout loss.

Agüero was included in Gerardo Martino's 23-man squad for the Copa América Centenario and scored his first goal of the tournament in Argentina's second group match, a 5–0 win over Panama on 10 June 2016, which allowed them to advance to the quarter-finals of the competition. Agüero considered retiring from international football shortly after losing against Chile in a penalty shootout in the final of the tournament for a second consecutive time.

==== 2018 World Cup, 2019 Copa América, and 2021 Copa América ====
On 14 November 2017, Agüero was taken to hospital after fainting in the dressing room at half-time in a 4–2 loss to Nigeria in a friendly match in Krasnodar, Russia.

In May 2018, Agüero was named in Argentina's preliminary 35-man squad for the 2018 FIFA World Cup in Russia; later that month, he was included in Jorge Sampaoli's final 23-man squad for the competition. In his team's first group match of the tournament against Iceland on 16 June, he scored the opening goal of an eventual 1–1 draw; this was his first ever World Cup goal. In the round of 16 match against France on 30 June, Agüero scored Argentina's final goal in a 4–3 defeat, which saw his side eliminated from the World Cup.

On 21 May 2019, he was included in Lionel Scaloni's final 23-man Argentina squad for the 2019 Copa América. In Argentina's final group match against Qatar on 23 June, Agüero scored the second goal in a 2–0 win, which enabled his team to advance to the knock-out stages. On 28 June, in the quarter-finals of the tournament, Agüero assisted Lautaro Martínez's opening goal, and was also involved in the second goal, scored by Giovani Lo Celso, as Argentina defeated Venezuela 2–0 to advance to the semi-finals. In the third-place match against Chile on 6 July, Agüero scored the opening goal in an eventual 2–1 win, to help Argentina capture the bronze medal.

On 28 June 2021, Agüero made his 100th senior international appearance for Argentina in a 4–1 win against Bolivia in his team's final group stage match of the 2021 Copa América, in which he set up Messi's second goal. Argentina eventually won the tournament.

During the 2022 FIFA World Cup, Agüero was present with the winning Argentine team for the duration of the tournament as an unofficial supporter, as his heart conditions had forced his retirement a year earlier. Though not an official member of the team, he was seen celebrating with the players after their win in the final.

== Style of play ==
Sergio is a photocopy of Romário, they are the same player.

— Roberto Mancini

Often considered one of the best strikers in the world during his playing days, Agüero is regarded as an all-out centre forward, although he is a versatile player, who can also play as a second striker off another striker, which he often did at Atlético Madrid with Diego Forlán, due to his passing ability, link-up play, tactical intelligence, and vision, which made him a capable assist-man. Although naturally right footed, he is also capable of striking well with his left foot, and can finish well both inside and outside the area with his powerful and accurate shot. A prolific goalscorer, Agüero's playing style is characterised by agility, acceleration, excellent movement off the ball, and strength, being described as "sharp and clever" by former Argentine player Osvaldo Ardiles; a view which is shared by his international captain Messi, who believes Agüero possesses "immense power, strength and an incredible work ethic". Combined with his close control, quick feet, dribbling skills, and strength to keep the ball, he has been described as "a menace in the box".

Agüero's goalscoring and collective achievements with Manchester City have led to debates over whether he is the greatest foreign player in Premier League history, alongside Manchester United's Eric Cantona and Arsenal's Henry. In Shearer's view, the Premier League's all-time leading goalscorer, Agüero is "the best foreign player to have played in the Premier League." In a 2016 article, ESPN labelled Agüero "the most lethal striker in the history of the Premier League," citing statistical data showing that he reached 100 Premier League goals at a faster goals-per-minute rate than any player before him. In December 2014, the French publication So Foot argued that he was the best striker in the world.

When asked to name the players who influenced his playing style, Agüero named former Brazilian striker Ronaldo, Messi, Ronaldinho and Maradona as the best players to have played the game, but said that the player who influenced his style of play the most was "the Brazilian Ronaldo". Aguero has a diminutive figure with a stocky build, which has led to comparisons with former Manchester City teammate Carlos Tevez and past forwards such as Romário, Alessandro Del Piero, and Maradona. When both were on the same team, some pundits called Agüero Tevez's heir apparent at City and others said that he was superior to his compatriot. His ex-manager at Manchester City, Roberto Mancini, has compared Agüero to former Brazilian striker, Romário, due to his pace, goalscoring ability, positioning in the area, and technique. Despite his ability, Agüero's playing time has often been limited by injuries throughout his career.

== Personal life ==
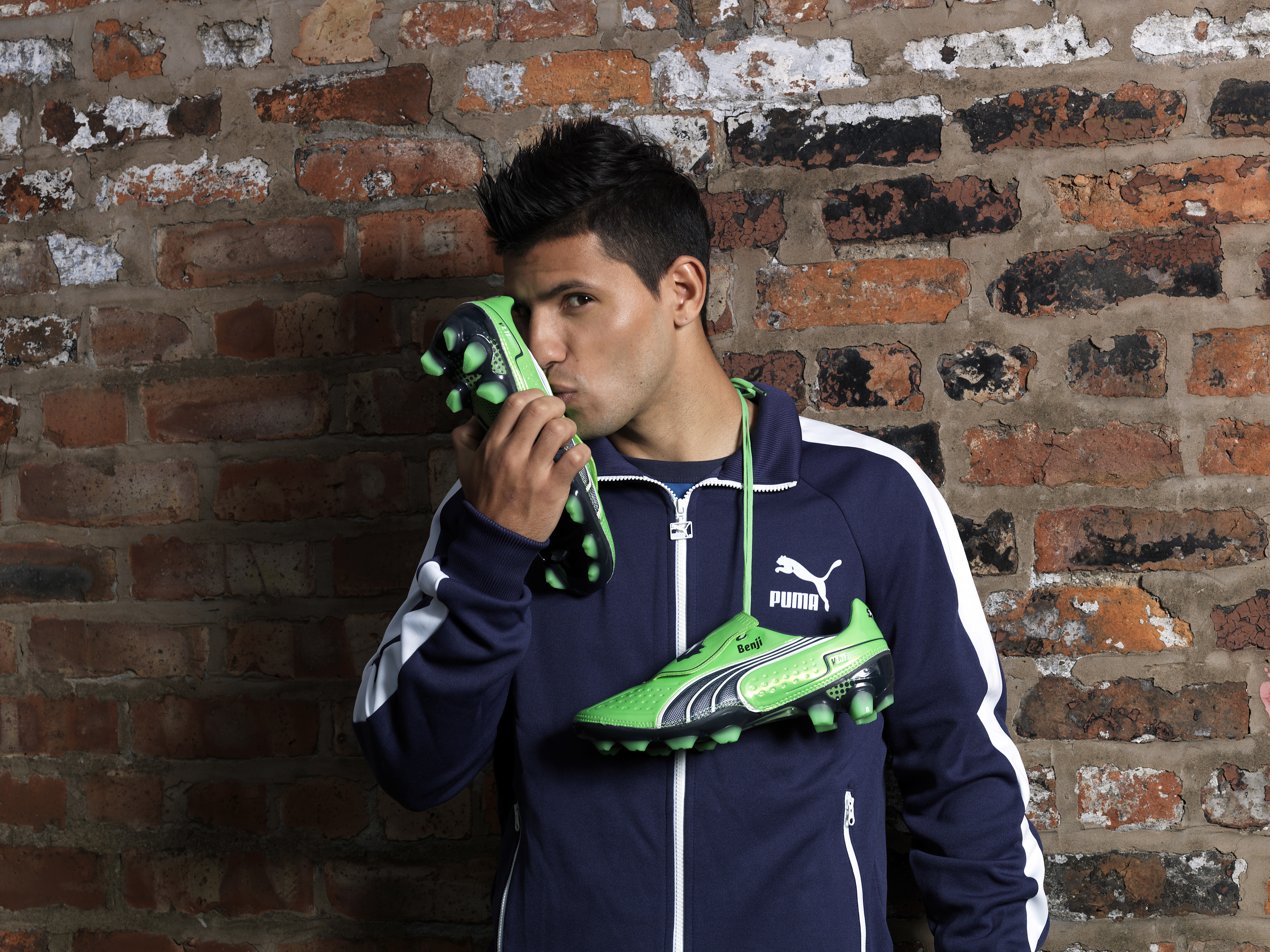
Agüero in 2011

Agüero was formerly married to Gianinna Maradona, the youngest daughter of Diego Maradona. On 19 February 2009, Giannina gave birth to their son, Benjamín, in Madrid. Diego Maradona was there for the birth of his first grandson, while Agüero, then 20, missed Atlético's training session earlier in the day. Atlético offered their congratulations in a statement on their official website. Agüero and Giannina divorced in 2012 after four years of marriage.

Agüero's nickname "Kun", which features on his shirt, dates back to his childhood. It was first given to him by his grandparents, due to a resemblance to the character "Kum-Kum" from the anime Wanpaku Omukashi Kumu Kumu which was Agüero's favourite television programme as a child. He said "I have grown to appreciate it because it's unique. It's not every day an athlete is nicknamed after a cartoon character!" Agüero has a tattoo on the inside of his right arm inscribed in Tengwar—a form of writing invented by J. R. R. Tolkien in The Lord of the Rings—that transliterates roughly to Kun Agüero in the Latin script. He also has a tattoo on his left arm of his son's name and date of birth. Agüero holds Spanish nationality, after being granted citizenship in 2010 whilst playing for Atlético Madrid.

Gastón del Castillo and Mauricio del Castillo are brothers of Agüero. Agüero shares a close friendship with Messi, his regular roommate during outings for the national team since 2005. He described Messi as being "like a brother" in his 2014 autobiography, Born to Rise, which contains a foreword written by Messi.

During the three-month football break due to the coronavirus pandemic in 2020, Agüero started live-streaming himself playing various video games on Twitch. He became the fastest-growing streamer in the month of May, reaching 1 million followers. He has been especially popular among the Spanish-speaking community, collaborating with many big names such as El Rubius and even calling Messi once live on air. In November 2022, Agüero joined the newly established Kings League serving as chairman for one of the competing teams, Kunisports, featuring as a guest player for his own side. In March 2025, it was revealed that Kunisports would move from Kings League Spain to Kings League Americas (later renamed Kings League Mexico) following the 2025 Kings World Cup Clubs, and would later rebrand to KRÜ FC. Agüero also is the founder of KRÜ Esports, an esports club who most notably compete on the Valorant Champions Tour.

Agüero welcomed his second child, a daughter named Olivia, with actress Sofía Calzetti in 2024. In 2025, Disney+ released Kun by Agüero, a documentary series about his life and career.

== Career statistics ==
=== Club ===
Appearances and goals by club, season and competition
Club	Season	League			National Cup (Note: Includes Copa del Rey, FA Cup)		League Cup (Note: Includes Football League/EFL Cup)		Continental		Other		Total	
Club	Season	Division	Apps	Goals	Apps	Goals	Apps	Goals	Apps	Goals	Apps	Goals	Apps	Goals
Independiente	2002–03	Argentine Primera División	1	0	—		—		—		—		1	0
Independiente	2003–04	Argentine Primera División	5	0	—		—		2 (Note: Appearances in Copa Libertadores)	0	—		7	0
Independiente	2004–05	Argentine Primera División	12	5	—		—		—		—		12	5
Independiente	2005–06	Argentine Primera División	36	18	—		—		—		—		36	18
Independiente	Total		54	23	—		—		2	0	—		56	23
Atlético Madrid	2006–07	La Liga	38	6	4	1	—		—		—		42	7
Atlético Madrid	2007–08	La Liga	37	19	4	2	—		9 (Note: Eight appearances and six goals in UEFA Cup, one appearance in UEFA Intertoto Cup)	6	—		50	27
Atlético Madrid	2008–09	La Liga	37	17	1	0	—		9 (Note: Appearance(s) in UEFA Champions League)	4	—		47	21
Atlético Madrid	2009–10	La Liga	31	12	7	1 (Note: The second goal against Huelva is considered as an own goal by Magnus Troest.)	—		16 (Note: Eight appearances and four goals in UEFA Champions League, eight appearances and two goals in UEFA Europa League)	6	—		54	19
Atlético Madrid	2010–11	La Liga	32	20	4	3	—		4 (Note: Appearances in UEFA Europa League)	3	1 (Note: Appearance in UEFA Super Cup)	1	41	27
Atlético Madrid	Total		175	74	20	7	—		38	19	1	1	234	101
Manchester City	2011–12	Premier League	34	23	1	1	3	1	10 (Note: Six appearances and one goal in UEFA Champions League, four appearances and four goals in UEFA Europa League)	5	0	0	48	30
Manchester City	2012–13	Premier League	30	12	4	3	0	0	5	2	1 (Note: Appearance in FA Community Shield)	0	40	17
Manchester City	2013–14	Premier League	23	17	3	4	2	1	6	6	—		34	28
Manchester City	2014–15	Premier League	33	26	1	0	1	0	7	6	0	0	42	32
Manchester City	2015–16	Premier League	30	24	1	1	4	2	9	2	—		44	29
Manchester City	2016–17	Premier League	31	20	5	5	1	0	8	8	—		45	33
Manchester City	2017–18	Premier League	25	21	3	2	4	3	7	4	—		39	30
Manchester City	2018–19	Premier League	33	21	2	2	3	1	7	6	1	2	46	32
Manchester City	2019–20	Premier League	24	16	2	2	3	3	3	2	0	0	32	23
Manchester City	2020–21	Premier League	12	4	0	0	1	0	7	2	—		20	6
Manchester City	Total		275	184	22	20	22	11	69	43	2	2	390	260
Barcelona	2021–22	La Liga	4	1	0	0	—		1	0	0	0	5	1
Career total			508	282	42	27	22	11	110	62	3	3	685	385

=== International ===
Appearances and goals by national team and year
National team	Year	Apps	Goals
Argentina	2006	2	0
Argentina	2007	4	1
Argentina	2008	9	4
Argentina	2009	6	2
Argentina	2010	5	2
Argentina	2011	8	5
Argentina	2012	7	2
Argentina	2013	8	5
Argentina	2014	10	1
Argentina	2015	10	10
Argentina	2016	11	1
Argentina	2017	4	2
Argentina	2018	5	3
Argentina	2019	8	3
Argentina	2020	0	0
Argentina	2021	4	0
Total		101	41

Scores and results list Argentina's goal tally first, score column indicates score after each Agüero goal.

List of international goals scored by Sergio Agüero
No.	Date	Venue	Cap	Opponent	Score	Result	Competition
1	17 November 2007	Estadio Monumental Antonio Vespucio Liberti, Buenos Aires, Argentina	6	Bolivia	1–0	3–0	2010 FIFA World Cup qualification
2	26 March 2008	Cairo International Stadium, Cairo, Egypt	7	Egypt	1–0	2–0	Friendly
3	4 June 2008	Qualcomm Stadium, San Diego, United States	8	Mexico	4–1	4–1	Friendly
4	6 September 2008	Estadio Monumental Antonio Vespucio Liberti, Buenos Aires, Argentina	12	Paraguay	1–1	1–1	2010 FIFA World Cup qualification
5	11 October 2008	Estadio Monumental Antonio Vespucio Liberti, Buenos Aires, Argentina	14	Uruguay	2–0	2–1	2010 FIFA World Cup qualification
6	28 March 2009	Estadio Monumental Antonio Vespucio Liberti, Buenos Aires, Argentina	17	Venezuela	4–0	4–0	2010 FIFA World Cup qualification
7	12 August 2009	Lokomotiv Stadium, Moscow, Russia	19	Russia	1–1	3–2	Friendly
8	24 May 2010	Estadio Monumental Antonio Vespucio Liberti, Buenos Aires, Argentina	22	Canada	5–0	5–0	Friendly
9	7 September 2010	Estadio Monumental Antonio Vespucio Liberti, Buenos Aires, Argentina	26	Spain	4–1	4–1	Friendly
10	20 June 2011	Estadio Monumental Antonio Vespucio Liberti, Buenos Aires, Argentina	27	Albania	3–0	3–0	Friendly
11	1 July 2011	Estadio Ciudad de La Plata, La Plata, Argentina	28	Bolivia	1–1	1–1	2011 Copa América
12	11 July 2011	Estadio Mario Alberto Kempes, Córdoba, Argentina	30	Costa Rica	1–0	3–0	2011 Copa América
13	11 July 2011	Estadio Mario Alberto Kempes, Córdoba, Argentina	30	Costa Rica	2–0	3–0	2011 Copa América
14	15 November 2011	Estadio Metropolitano Roberto Meléndez, Barranquilla, Colombia	34	Colombia	2–1	2–1	2014 FIFA World Cup qualification
15	2 June 2012	Estadio Monumental Antonio Vespucio Liberti, Buenos Aires, Argentina	36	Ecuador	1–0	4–0	2014 FIFA World Cup qualification
16	12 October 2012	Estadio Malvinas Argentinas, Mendoza, Argentina	39	Uruguay	2–0	2–0	2014 FIFA World Cup qualification
17	6 February 2013	Friends Arena, Solna, Sweden	42	Sweden	2–1	3–2	Friendly
18	11 June 2013	Estadio Olímpico Atahualpa, Quito, Ecuador	44	Ecuador	1–0	1–1	2014 FIFA World Cup qualification
19	10 September 2013	Estadio Defensores del Chaco, Asunción, Paraguay	46	Paraguay	2–1	5–2	2014 FIFA World Cup qualification
20	18 November 2013	Busch Stadium, St. Louis, United States	49	Bosnia and Herzegovina	1–0	2–0	Friendly
21	18 November 2013	Busch Stadium, St. Louis, United States	49	Bosnia and Herzegovina	2–0	2–0	Friendly
22	3 September 2014	Esprit Arena, Düsseldorf, Germany	57	Germany	1–0	4–2	Friendly
23	31 March 2015	MetLife Stadium, East Rutherford, United States	60	Ecuador	1–0	2–1	Friendly
24	6 June 2015	Estadio San Juan del Bicentenario, San Juan, Argentina	61	Bolivia	2–0	5–0	Friendly
25	6 June 2015	Estadio San Juan del Bicentenario, San Juan, Argentina	61	Bolivia	3–0	5–0	Friendly
26	6 June 2015	Estadio San Juan del Bicentenario, San Juan, Argentina	61	Bolivia	4–0	5–0	Friendly
27	13 June 2015	Estadio La Portada, La Serena, Chile	62	Paraguay	1–0	2–2	2015 Copa América
28	16 June 2015	Estadio La Portada, La Serena, Chile	63	Uruguay	1–0	1–0	2015 Copa América
29	30 June 2015	Estadio Municipal de Concepción, Concepción, Chile	65	Paraguay	5–1	6–1	2015 Copa América
30	4 September 2015	BBVA Compass Stadium, Houston, United States	67	Bolivia	2–0	7–0	Friendly
31	4 September 2015	BBVA Compass Stadium, Houston, United States	67	Bolivia	4–0	7–0	Friendly
32	9 September 2015	AT&T Stadium, United States	68	Mexico	1–2	2–2	Friendly
33	10 June 2016	Soldier Field, Chicago, United States	74	Panama	5–0	5–0	Copa América Centenario
34	11 November 2017	Luzhniki Stadium, Moscow, Russia	83	Russia	1–0	1–0	Friendly
35	14 November 2017	Krasnodar Stadium, Krasnodar, Russia	84	Nigeria	2–0	2–4	Friendly
36	29 May 2018	La Bombonera, Buenos Aires, Argentina	85	Haiti	4–0	4–0	Friendly
37	16 June 2018	Otkritie Arena, Moscow, Russia	86	Iceland	1–0	1–1	2018 FIFA World Cup
38	30 June 2018	Kazan Arena, Kazan, Russia	89	France	3–4	3–4	2018 FIFA World Cup
39	23 June 2019	Arena do Grêmio, Porto Alegre, Brazil	93	Qatar	2–0	2–0	2019 Copa América
40	6 July 2019	Arena Corinthians, São Paulo, Brazil	96	Chile	1–0	2–1	2019 Copa América
41	18 November 2019	Bloomfield Stadium, Tel Aviv, Israel	97	Uruguay	1–1	2–2	Friendly

== Honours ==
Atlético Madrid

- UEFA Europa League: 2009–10
- UEFA Super Cup: 2010
- Copa del Rey runner-up: 2009–10

Manchester City

- Premier League: 2011–12, 2013–14, 2017–18, 2018–19, 2020–21
- FA Cup: 2018–19; runner-up: 2012–13
- Football League/EFL Cup: 2013–14, 2015–16, 2017–18, 2018–19, 2019–20, 2020–21
- FA Community Shield: 2012, 2018, 2019
- UEFA Champions League runner-up: 2020–21

Argentina U20

- FIFA U-20 World Cup: 2005, 2007

Argentina U23

- Olympic Gold Medal: 2008

Argentina

- Copa América: 2021
- FIFA World Cup runner-up: 2014

Individual

- South American Team of the Year: 2005
- FIFA U-20 World Cup Golden Ball: 2007
- FIFA U-20 World Cup Golden Shoe: 2007
- Golden Boy: 2007
- La Liga Ibero-American Player of the Year: 2007–08
- Don Balón Award: 2007–08
- World Soccer Young Player of the Year: 2009
- Manchester City Player of the Year: 2011–12, 2014–15
- Manchester City Goal of the Season: 2011–12
- Premier League Player of the Month: October 2013, November 2014, January 2016, April 2016, January 2018, February 2019, January 2020
- FSF Player of the Year: 2014
- Premier League Golden Boot: 2014–15
- Eurosport Top 10 Premier League Players of the Season 2nd place: 2014–15
- Premier League Player of the Year by Northwest Football Awards: 2015
- PFA Team of the Year: 2017–18 Premier League, 2018–19 Premier League
- Sports Illustrated Premier League Team of the Decade: 2010–2019
- IFFHS CONMEBOL Team of the Decade 2011–2020
- Premier League Hall of Fame: 2022

== See also ==
- List of men's footballers with 100 or more international caps
- List of most-followed Twitch channels
