= N00b (TV series) =

New Zealand coming-of-age television series

- Genre: Coming-of-age; Romantic comedy; Teen drama
- Created by: Victoria Boult; Rachel Fawcett
- Based on: n00b by Victoria Boult and Rachel Fawcett
- Directed by: Victoria Boult; Josh Frizzell
- Starring: Max Crean; Jaxson Cook; Shervonne Grierson; Felicia To'a; James Sexton; Caleb Nazzer; Zac O'Meagher
- Music by: James Gibb; Oliver Johnston
- Country of origin: New Zealand
- Original language: English
- No. of seasons: 1
- No. of episodes: 6 (list of episodes)

Production
- Executive producers: Kathleen Anderson; Joshua Frizzell; Annabelle Lee-Mather
- Producer: Rachel Fawcett
- Cinematography: Daryl Wong
- Editor: Annie Hubbard
- Running time: 21–24 minutes
- Production companies: Great Southern Television; Lusty Productions

Original release
- Network: Three
- Release: 17 October 2024 – present

n00b is a New Zealand coming-of-age romantic comedy-drama television series created by Victoria Boult and Rachel Fawcell, based on their TikTok web series of the same name. It was first broadcast on Three on 17 October 2024. It stars Max Crean as Nikau, a high school student who becomes a social outcast after being outed. It also stars Jaxson Cook, Shervonne Grierson, Felicia To'a, James Sexton, Caleb Nazzer, and Zac O'Meagher.

== Premise ==
Set in Gore, New Zealand in 2005, Nikau, a popular high school student, becomes a social outcast after being outed. Struggling with his identity, he embarks on a journey to discover his sexuality and self-acceptance with his new friends.

== Cast ==
=== Main ===
- Max Crean as Nikau Bennett, a high school student who is outed as gay.
- Jaxson Cook as James, a new student who is an emo kid.
- Shervonne Grierson as Lauren Conrad "LC", Nikau's girlfriend who has ambitions to leave Gore.
- Felicia To'a as Clara Fekitoa, LC's best friend.
- James Sexton as Christian, Nikau's best friend and Clara's boyfriend.
- Caleb Nazzer as Stephen
- Zac O'Meagher as Daniel

=== Recurring ===
- Ryan O'Kane as Principal Wilson, the school's principal.
- Bree Peters as Aroha Bennett, Nikau's mother and the school's rugby coach.
- Joni Watson as Taylor, the school's social outcast.
- Mark Mitchinson as Norman Conrad, LC's father who owns a video rental shop.
- Peter Feeney as John Bennett, Nikau's father.
- Deanna Chiang as Li Conrad, LC's mother.
- Suli Moa as Fetu Fekitoa, Clara's father.

=== Guest ===
- Darien Takle as Mrs Crawford
- Jamie Irvine as Peter, James's father.

== Episodes ==
No.	Title	Directed by	Written by	Original release date
1	"I Am Not Okay"	Josh Frizzell	Victoria Boult	17 October 2024
2	"The Worst Day of Lauren Conrad's Life"	Josh Frizzell	Victoria Boult	17 October 2024
3	"The Real Clara Shady"	Victoria Boult	Victoria Boult	17 October 2024
4	"Invercargill Is For Lovers"	Victoria Boult	Victoria Boult	17 October 2024
5	"The Midnight Snack Club"	Victoria Boult	Malinna Liang	17 October 2024
6	"10 Things I Love About Gore"	Josh Frizzell	Victoria Boult	17 October 2024

== Production ==
In 2022, director Victoria Boult and producer Rachel Fawcett created a web series on TikTok, titled n00b, garnering more than 1.5 million views. Boult described the series as it "explores the impact of social media's rise on young people". In June 2023, it was reported that the series would be adapted into a television show on ThreeNow and Three through a partnership with Great Southern Television. It also received a NZ$1,499,541 production grant from NZ On Air.

In December 2023, the project was announced as part of Warner Bros. Discovery New Zealand's programming slate for 2024. In February 2025, the series was selected to be presented at the Berlinale Series Market in Market Selects program.

== Release ==
All episodes were made available for streaming on ThreeNow on 17 October 2024, with subsequent weekly airings on Three. In April 2025, the series was selected to compete in the Short Form Competition program at the 2025 Canneseries.

=== International distribution ===
In December 2023, it was reported that French distribution company Ogle had acquired the show's international distribution rights. Netflix acquired the show's distribution rights in Australia, releasing it on 13 February 2025. The series became available for streaming in France on Canal+ starting from 29 April 2025.
