= Suli Moa =

New Zealand playwright, actor, screenwriter

- Born: 31 December 1986 (age 39); Greenlane, Auckland
- Education: Saint Kentigern College
- Alma mater: Toi Whakaari, The University of Auckland
- Known for: Acting & Writing
- Children: 4

Suli Moa (born 31 December 1986) is a New Zealand playwright, actor, screenwriter and teacher of Tongan descent. He wrote and performed the first Tongan Play in New Zealand, Kingdom of Lote. As a playwright Moa has been awarded the Adam New Zealand Play Award for Best Pacific Play, 12th Round (2016), and Tales of a Princess (2018). Moa's acting credits include A love yarn (2021) and Sweet Tooth (2021). His writing credits include The Panthers (2021) and Shortland Street (2021-2022). Moa has also appeared in multiple short films as an actor and served as a cultural advisor.

== Early life ==
Born on 31 December 1986, Moa is the second of three children. His father was a factory worker from the village of Fahefa (Tongatapu) and his mother was a dishwasher, from the village of Fangale'ounga (Ha'apai) in Tonga. Moa grew up in Glen Innes, East Auckland, then moved to New Lynn where he began schooling at New Lynn Primary School in West Auckland, in 1991. He attended Avondale Intermediate and finished his secondary schooling at Saint Kentigern College on a scholarship.

== Biography ==
In 2007 Moa began studying at Toi Whakaari in Wellington, and graduated with a BA in performing arts (Acting) in 2009. He furthered his studies at The University of Auckland, where he completed a Diploma in Teaching Secondary Drama & Dance in 2011. Since graduating, Moa has taught at several secondary schools in Auckland as a Drama and English teacher at Marcellin College and Westlake Girls High School.

Moa wrote, acted and staged the first Tongan play in New Zealand, Kingdom of Lote, at Mangere Arts Centre. The Matala Festival was established in 2012 by Moa and Sesilia Pusiaki (actor and choreographer) to platform and amplify the stories of the Tongan community through a theatre, visual arts and poetry. In the same year, Moa and his wife Natalie Moa established their own theatre company, Tales From the Kava Bowl (TFTKB) where their first play written by Moa, A Hearts Path, was staged as part of the Matala Festival at Mangere Arts Centre in Auckland. The Matala Festival also included a performance from poet Karlo Mila.

For his contributions to Tongan theatre in New Zealand, Moa was awarded the Emerging Artist award from Creative New Zealand. In 2016, Moa received an Adam NZ Play Award for his piece 12th Round, produced by TFTKB at Circa Theatre, Wellington.

In 2018, he was awarded Best Play by a Pasifika Playwright for his play Tales of A Princess, a story highlighting the 2009 tragedy of the ship Princess Ashika. This show toured the Tongan church communities within Auckland. In 2020 Moa premiered his most recent theatre piece, BURNING OPINION at the Auckland Fringe Festival, based on the 2006 Nuku'alofa riots. The show went on to win Best Ensemble and PAANZ ready to tour at the Fringe awards.

== Filmography ==
=== Films & Short films ===
Year	Film	Role	Notes	Ref.
2011	Shopping For One	Greg	Short Film	
2012	Inorganic	Garth	Short Film	
2021	Lea Tupu'anga/Mother Tongue	Cultural advisor	Short Film	
2021	A Love Yarn	Col	Film	

=== Television series ===
Year	Series	Role	Notes	Ref.
2020	The Panthers	Writer/Extra	4Knights Productions Nima - Episode 5	
2021	Sweet Tooth	Jimmy	Netflix	
2021	The Feijoa Club	Writer	BSAG Productions	
2021–present	Shortland Street	Writer	South Pacific Pictures	
2024	N00b	Fetu Fekitoa	Great Southern Television; Lusty Productions	

=== Theatre ===
Year	Play	Role	Notes	Ref.
2009	Once Were Samoans	Taihapa Morgan	Kila Kokonut Krew, Dir. Vela Manusaute	
2010	Once Were Samoans	Sasa	Kila Kokonut Krew, Dir. Vela Manusaute	
2011	Kingdom of Lote	Saia/Writer	Kila Kokonut Krew, Dir. Vela Manusaute	
2011	Strictly Brown	Quartet	Kila Kokonut Krew, Dir. Vela Manusaute	
2012	A Hearts Path	Sam/Writer	Tales from the Kava Bowl, Kate Louise-Elliot	
2012	Taro King	Ricky	Kila Kokonut Krew, Dir. Vela Manusaute	
2013	No Man's Land	Paea/Writer	Tales from the Kava Bowl, Jess Sanderson	
2013	LEKA	Writer	Commissioned by Radio New Zealand	
2013	BUDDY TIME	Writer	Manukau Institute of Technology (MIT)	
2016	12th Round	Writer	Adam award reipient - Best Pasifika Play.	
2018	TALES OF A PRINCESS	Writer	Tales from the Kava Bowl, Dir. Shadon Meridith and Amelia Reid-Meridith	
2020	BURNING OPINION	Writer	Tales from The Kava Bowl, Dir. Loma & Mosese Uhila	
