= Anne Rambach =

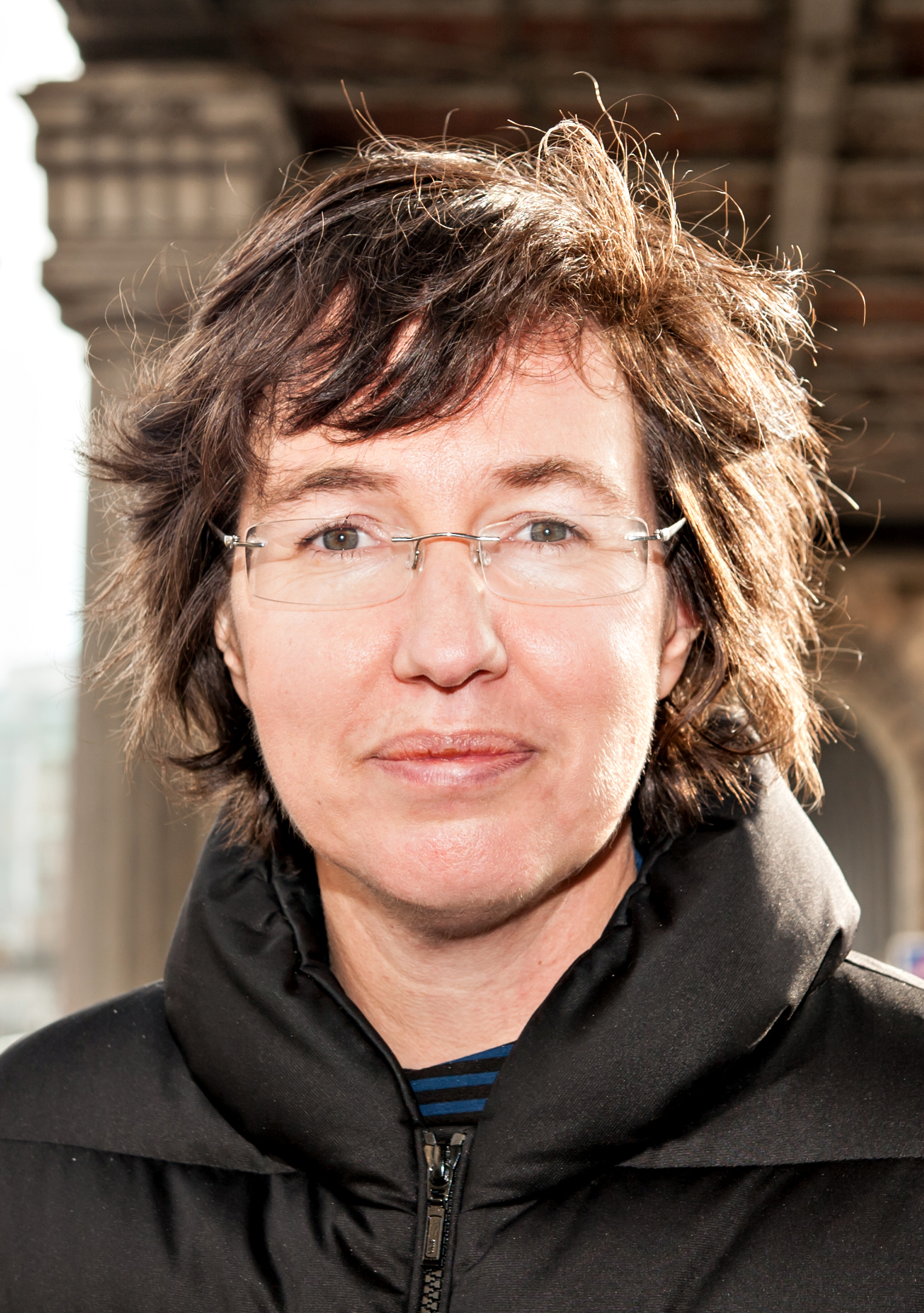
- Born: May 14, 1970 (age 56); Saint-Brieuc, France
- Occupation: author
- Writing career
- Language: French
- Period: 2000 -

Anne Rambach (born May 14, 1970, in Saint-Brieuc in Brittany) is a French author of crime and thriller novels. She is also engaged in gender equality issues and the rights of homosexuals.

== Biography ==
Anne Rambach has studied literature. In the 1990s, she was active in "Act-Up Paris", an organization working against aids. Together with her life partner Marine Rambach, she has written for TV and run a publishing house focusing on gay literature. She advocates for gender equality and the rights of homosexuals. As a novelist, she made her debut in 2000 with the first part of the so-called Tokyo trilogy. The couple has two children and resides in Paris.

== Writing ==
Anne Rambach began her writing career with a trilogy, Tokyo Chaos, Tokyo Atomic and Tokyo Mirage. These are crime novels featuring the main character Yanko Go, a young female police officer in the US with Japanese roots. She is sent by the intelligence service to Tokyo, where she becomes embroiled in dramatic events involving a terrorist attack and other crimes. In Tokyo Atomic, murders occur in connection with a nuclear waste management facility. In Tokyo Mirage, the protagonist is involved in investigating crimes linked to mafia groups.

Success Story takes place in Miami, where a Black woman is killed outside her home. The investigation reveals that her adopted son is a star on an American football team. Political and economic interests complicate the case Bombyx, Scent of Evil and Devastation are standalone thrillers featuring freelance journalist Diane Harpmann as the main character. Bombyx is a restaurant in Paris's Chinatown, and the drama begins there but is shown to have connections to the Russian mafia Scent of Evil is set in the fashion world, where Angelina Jolie is murdered in connection with the launch of a new perfume, Enfer (hell). Devastation deals with the revelation of the asbestos scandal in France and is explicitly critical of society. It has also been provided with extensive source references.

Anne Rambach has also published several essays together with Marina Rambach. "Les intellos précaires" (2001) describes the precarious conditions for young cultural workers in France. "La culture gaie et lesbienne" (2003) discusses the perception of homosexuality in society.

== Bibliography ==
=== Own books ===
- Tokyo Chaos, Calmann-Lévy, 2000, ISBN 978-2-7021-3106-0
- Tokyo Atomic, Pocket, 2001, ISBN 9782702132173
- Tokyo Mirage, Calmann-Lévy, 2002, ISBN 9782702132890
- Success Story, Plon, 2004, ISBN 2-25919777-9
- Bombyx, Albin Michel, 2007, ISBN 978-2-226-17820-7
- Scent of Evil, Albin Michel, 2008, ISBN 978-2-226-17821-4
- Devastation, Albin Michel, 2009, ISBN 978-2-226-17822-1
- Paris-Paris (2008)
- Geography of Ghosts (2020)

=== Essays ===
- "Les intellos précaires" (2001)
- "La culture gaie et lesbienne" (2003)
