= 2022 New Zealand Television Awards =

- Awarded for: Excellence in New Zealand television
- Date: 24 November 2022
- Location: Auckland
- Country: New Zealand
- Hosted by: Kura Forrester

The New Zealand Television Awards for 2022 were held on 24 November 2022 at Shed 10 in Auckland, New Zealand. The event was hosted by comedian Kura Forrester.

== Nominees and winners ==
Winners are listed first and highlighted in boldface.

Key
† – Non-technical award
‡ – Technical award

=== Television ===
NZ On Air Best Drama†	Best Comedy†
**The Panthers (TVNZ 1 & TVNZ+)**; The Pact (TVNZ+); One Lane Bridge (TVNZ 1)	**Raised by Refugees (Prime)**; Wellington Paranormal – Series 4 (TVNZ 2); Kid Sister (TVNZ+)
Best Factual Series†	NZ On Air Best Documentary†
**Chatham Islanders (Whakaata Māori)**; Ake, Ake, Ake (Whakaata Māori); I AM: Series 3 (TVNZ 1)	**Stuff Circuit – Disordered (Stuff)**; A Mild Touch of Cancer (Prime); Recovery 29 (Prime)
Best Original Reality Series†	Best Format Reality Series†
**Down for Love (TVNZ 2)**; The Ex Best Thing (TVNZ 2); First Responders (TVNZ 1); The Casketeers (TVNZ 1)	**Match Fit – Series 2 (Three)**; MasterChef New Zealand (Three); Lego Masters NZ (TVNZ 2); Snack Masters NZ (TVNZ 2)
Best Current Affairs Programme†	NZ On Air Best Children's Programme†
**Newsroom Investigates: Breaking Bad Practice (Newsroom)**; Q+A with Jack Tame (TVNZ 1); Te Ao with Moana (Whakaata Māori)	**Bird's Eye View (HEIHEI)**; Goodbye A.I. (HEIHEI); Tamaiti Tū (Whakaata Māori)
Te Māngai Pāho Best Māori Programme†	Te Māngai Pāho Best Reo Māori Programme†
**The Casketeers (TVNZ 1)**; Ake Ake Ake (Whakaata Māori); Moana Jackson. Portrait of a Quiet Revolutionary (Whakaata Māori)	**Te Karere (TVNZ 1)**; Ngā Tohu Matariki o te Tau 2022 (Whakaata Māori); Match Fit (Three)
NZ On Air Best Pasifika Programme†	Best News Coverage†
**The Panthers (TVNZ 1 & TVNZ+)**; Akanuanua (TheCoconet.TV); All Access: Moana Pasifika (Sky Sport)	**Russia Invades Ukraine – Newshub (Newshub)**; Climate Change & Sea Level Rise – Newshub (Newshub); Te Karere & 1 News Breaking Special – Parliament Protest – 1 News (TVNZ 1)
Best Sports Programme†	Best Live Event Coverage†
**1-39: The Highlanders Story (Sky Sport)**; Scratched: Aotearoa's Lost Sporting Legends (The Spinoff); East Coast Rising (TVNZ 2)	**Celebrate Matariki (Various)**; Super Saturday Vaxathon (Various); Ngā Tohu Matariki o te Tau 2022 (Matariki Awards 2022) (Whakaata Māori)
Best Entertainment Programme†	Best Director: Documentary/Factual†
**Semele (Sky Arts)**; Stan Walker: Impossible Live (TVNZ 2); Jono & Ben: Good Sports (TVNZ 2)	**Chris Graham – Scribe: Return of the Crusader (TVNZ+)**; Johnny Agnew – Young and The Reckless (Re: / TVNZ+); Kathleen Mantel – Chatham Islanders (Whakaata Māori); Whatanui Flavell – Ake, Ake, Ake (Whakaata Māori)
Screen Auckland Best Director: Drama / Comedy Drama†	Best Actress†
**Miki Magasiva – The Panthers, Episode 1 (TVNZ 1 & TVNZ+)**; Tom Hern & Vea Mafile'o – The Panthers, Episode 3 (TVNZ 1 & TVNZ+); Chris Graham & Mario Faumui – The Panthers, Episode 6 (TVNZ 1 & TVNZ+)	**Irene Wood – The Pact (TVNZ+)**; Grace Palmer – Good Grief (TVNZ+); Miriama McDowell – Head High (Three)
Best Supporting Actress†	Best Actor†
**Timmie Cameron – The Pact (TVNZ+)**; Chelsie Preston Crayford – The Panthers (TVNZ 1 & TVNZ+); Awa Puna – Ahikāroa (Whakaata Māori)	**Ian Mune – The Pact (TVNZ+)**; Craig Hall – Head High (Three); Dimitrius Schuster-Koloamatangi – The Panthers (TVNZ 1 & TVNZ+)
Best Supporting Actor†	Reporter of the Year†
**Scotty Cotter – Kura (TVNZ+)**; Jordan Mooney – The Panthers (TVNZ 1 & TVNZ+); Jordan Vaha'akolo – The Panthers (TVNZ 1 & TVNZ+)	**Barbara Dreaver – 1 News (TVNZ 1)**; Lisette Reymer – Newshub Live at 6 (Newshub); Patrick Gower – Newshub (Newshub)
Best Presenter: Entertainment†	Best Presenter: News and Current Affairs†
**Tāmati Rimene-Sproat – Hongi To Hāngī: And Everything In Between (TVNZ 1)**; Kanoa Lloyd – Sort Your Life Out NZ (Three); Nore Martin – Moon Tide Fishing (Whakaata Māori); Jono Pryor & Ben Boyce – Jono & Ben: Good Sports (TVNZ 2)	**Jack Tame – Q+A with Jack Tame (TVNZ 1)**; Oriini Kaipara – Newshub Nation (Newshub); Ryan Bridge – Newshub & AM (Newshub); Scotty Morrison – Te Karere & Marae (TVNZ 1)
Best Editing: Documentary or Factual‡	Best Editing: Drama / Comedy Drama‡
**Prisca Bouchet, Julie Alp & Annie Goldson – A Mild Touch of Cancer (Prime)**; Toby Longbottom – Stuff Circuit (Stuff); Sacha Campbell – Scribe: Return of the Crusader (TVNZ+)	**Sacha Campbell – The Panthers (TVNZ 1 & TVNZ+)**; Margot Francis – The Panthers (TVNZ 1 & TVNZ+); Bryan Shaw – One Lane Bridge (TVNZ 1)
Best Camerawork: Documentary or Factual‡	Best Director: Multi Camera‡
**Bevan Crothers – Moko (Whakaata Māori)**; Timothy Firkin – Waka Huia (TVNZ 1); Dominic Fryer – Chatham Islanders (Whakaata Māori)	**Mitchell Hawkes – Stan Walker: Impossible Live (TVNZ 2)**; Matt Quin – Rugby League: NZ v Tonga Double Header (Men) (Sky Sport); Tobias Jones – Celebrate Matariki (Whakaata Māori)
Images & Sound Best Cinematography: Drama / Comedy Drama‡	Best Contribution to a Soundtrack‡
**Andrew McGeorge – The Panthers (TVNZ 1 & TVNZ+)**; Nina Wells – Good Grief: Season 2 (TVNZ+); Tim Flower – Kura: Season 2 (TVNZ+)	**Native Audio – The Panthers (TVNZ 1 & TVNZ+)**; Tom Miskin, Melanie Graham, Mike Bayliss & Steve Finnigan – Mystic (TVNZ 2); Gareth Van Niekerk, Brendon Morrow & Steve Finnigan – Beyond the Veil – Albularyo (TVNZ 2 & TVNZ+)
Images & Sound Best Original Score‡	Best Post Production Design‡
**David Long & Stephen Gallagher – Mystic: Series 2 (TVNZ 2)**; Tihema Bennett – Beyond the Veil: Te Kohu (The Mist) (TVNZ 2 & TVNZ+); Jonathan Crayford, P. Smith, choicevaughan & Diggy Dupé – The Panthers (TVNZ 1 & TVNZ+)	**James Gardner – The Panthers (TVNZ 1 & TVNZ+)**; Paul Lear – Mystic (TVNZ 2); Alana Cotton – Beyond the Veil: Te Kohu (The Mist) (TVNZ 2 & TVNZ+)
Best Production Design‡	Best Costume Design‡
**Gary Mackay, Alistair Kay & Anneke Botha – Cowboy Bebop (Netflix)**; Jane Bucknell – The Panthers (TVNZ 1 & TVNZ+); Melissa Spicer – Wellington Paranormal: Series 4 (TVNZ 2)	**Sammy Salsa – The Panthers (TVNZ 1 & TVNZ+)**; Sarah Aldridge – Under the Vines (TVNZ 1); Jane Holland – Cowboy Bebop (Netflix)
Best Makeup Design‡	Best Script: Comedy†
**Amanda Ashton – Ahikāroa: Season 4 (Whakaata Māori)**; Sarah O'Gorman – Under The Vines (TVNZ 1); Kelly Mitchell – The Panthers (TVNZ 1 & TVNZ+)	**Tom Sainsbury – Wellington Paranormal, Series 4, Episode 4 (TVNZ 2)**; Pax Assadi – Raised by Refugees (Prime); Nick Ward – Wellington Paranormal, Series 4, Episode 5 (TVNZ 2)
Best Script: Drama†	
**Harry McNaughton & Natalie Medlock – The Pact, Episode 2 (TVNZ+)**; Pip Hall – One Lane Bridge, Series 2, Episode 1 (TVNZ 1); Harry McNaughton & Natalie Medlock – The Pact, Episode 5 (TVNZ+)	

=== Special awards ===
Television Personality of the Year†	Television Legend†
**Bree Tomasel – Celebrity Treasure Island (TVNZ 2)**	**Janine Morrell-Gunn**
