= 2013–14 Sporting CP season =

Sporting CP
2013–14 season
- President: Bruno de Carvalho
- Manager: Leonardo Jardim
- Stadium: Estádio José Alvalade
- Primeira Liga: 2nd
- Taça de Portugal: Fourth round
- Taça da Liga: Group stage
- Top goalscorer: League: Fredy Montero (13); All: Fredy Montero (16)
Home colours	Away colours	Third colours

The Sporting Clube de Portugal's 2013–14 season main competition is the Primeira Liga, known as the Liga ZON Sagres for sponsorship purposes. This article shows player statistics and all matches that the club plays during the 2013–14 season.

== Competitions ==
=== Legend ===
Win Draw Loss Postponed

=== Primeira Liga ===
Pos	Team	Pld	W	D	L	GF	GA	GD	Pts	Qualification or relegation
1	Benfica (C)	30	23	5	2	58	18	+40	74	Qualification to Champions League group stage
2	Sporting CP	30	20	7	3	54	20	+34	67	Qualification to Champions League group stage
3	Porto	30	19	4	7	57	25	+32	61	Qualification to Champions League play-off round
4	Estoril	30	15	9	6	42	26	+16	54	Qualification to Europa League group stage
5	Nacional	30	11	12	7	43	33	+10	45	Qualification to Europa League play-off round

Source: LPFP (in Portuguese)
Rules for classification: 1) Points; 2) Head-to-head points; 3) Head-to-head goal difference; 4) Head-to-head away goals scored; 5) Goal difference; 6) Matches won; 7) Goals scored; 8) Play-off.
(Note: LPFP decided that only criteria 1, 5, 6 and 7 would be applied to establish the classification during the competition.)
(C) Champions

==== Results by round ====
Round	1	2	3	4	5	6	7	8	9	10	11	12	13	14	15	16	17	18	19	20	21	22	23	24	25	26	27	28	29	30
Ground	H	A	H	A	H	A	H	A	H	A	H	A	H	H	A	A	H	A	H	A	H	A	H	A	H	A	H	A	A	H
Result	W	W	D	W	D	W	W	L	W	W	W	W	W	D	D	W	D	L	W	W	W	D	W	W	W	W	W	W	D	L
Position	1	1	2	2	3	2	2	2	2	2	1	1	1	1	2	2	2	3	3	2	2	2	2	2	2	2	2	2	2	2

Source: LPFP
A = Away; H = Home; W = Win; D = Draw; L = Loss

==== Matches ====
18 August 2013 1	Sporting CP	5–1	Arouca	Lisbon
16:45	Maurício 31'; Montero 38', 70', 86'; Eduardo 66'		Bruno Amaro 19'	Stadium: Estádio José Alvalade; Attendance: 30,628; Referee: Rui Costa

24 August 2013 2	Académica	0–4	Sporting CP	Coimbra
20:15			Carrillo 23'; Rojo 41'; A. Silva 54' (pen.); Montero 58' (pen.)	Stadium: Estádio Cidade de Coimbra; Attendance: 14,194; Referee: Artur Soares Dias

31 August 2013 3	Sporting CP	1–1	Benfica	Lisbon
20:00	Montero 10'	Report	Marković 64'	Stadium: Estádio José Alvalade; Attendance: 49,109; Referee: Hugo Miguel

15 September 2013 4	Olhanense	0–2	Sporting CP	Olhão
17:45		Report	Montero 51'; Martins 60'	Stadium: Estádio José Arcanjo; Attendance: 10,148; Referee: Olegário Benquerença

21 September 2013 5	Sporting CP	1–1	Rio Ave	Lisbon
20:15	Eduardo 25'	Report	Tarantini 71'	Stadium: Estádio José Alvalade; Referee: Carlos Xistra

28 September 2013 6	Braga	1–2	Sporting CP	Braga
21:15	Alan 27'	Report	Montero 5'; Cédric 86'	Stadium: Estádio Municipal de Braga; Attendance: 15,716; Referee: Paulo Baptista

5 October 2013 7	Sporting CP	4–0	Vitória de Setúbal	Lisbon
20:15	Montero 40', 71'; Carrillo 58'; A. Silva 74' (pen.)	Report		Stadium: Estádio José Alvalade; Attendance: 32,573; Referee: Duarte Gomes

27 October 2013 8	Porto	3–1	Sporting CP	Porto
19:45	Josué 12' (pen.); Danilo 61'; González 74'	Report	William 60'	Stadium: Estádio do Dragão; Attendance: 48,108; Referee: Artur Soares Dias

2 November 2013 9	Sporting CP	3–2	Marítimo	Lisbon
20:15	Capel 28'; Slimani 67'; A. Silva 76' (pen.)	Report	Ferreira 34'; Héldon 45+1' (pen.)	Stadium: Estádio José Alvalade; Attendance: 25,083; Referee: Bruno Esteves

24 November 2013 10	Vitória de Guimarães	0–1	Sporting CP	Guimarães
19:15		Report	Slimani 90'	Stadium: Estádio D. Afonso Henriques; Referee: Paulo Baptista

1 December 2013 11	Sporting CP	4–0	Paços de Ferreira	Lisbon
19:45	Carvalho 15'; Montero 51', 72' (pen.); Martins 89'	Report		Stadium: Estádio José Alvalade; Attendance: 26,541; Referee: Jorge Ferreira

8 December 2013 12	Gil Vicente	0–2	Sporting CP	Barcelos
17:45		Report	Montero 19', 74'	Stadium: Estádio Cidade de Barcelos; Referee: Jorge Sousa

14 December 2013 13	Sporting CP	3–0	Belenenses	Lisbon
20:15	A. Silva 28' (pen.); Martins 53'; Eduardo 85'	Report		Stadium: Estádio José Alvalade; Attendance: 37,455; Referee: Hugo Pacheco

21 December 2013 14	Sporting CP	0–0	Nacional	Lisbon
20:15		Report		Stadium: Estádio José Alvalade; Attendance: 38,624; Referee: Manuel Mota

11 January 2014 15	Estoril Praia	0–0	Sporting CP	Estoril
20:15		Report		Stadium: Estádio António Coimbra da Mota; Attendance: 5,020; Referee: Pedro Proença

18 January 2014 16	Arouca	1–2	Sporting CP	Arouca
20:15	Bruno Amaro 15'	Report	Rojo 25'; Slimani 72'	Stadium: Estádio Municipal de Arouca; Attendance: 4,500; Referee: Cosme Machado

2 February 2014 17	Sporting CP	0–0	Académica	Lisbon
18:15		Report		Stadium: Estádio José Alvalade; Attendance: 36,168; Referee: Paulo Baptista

11 February 2014 18	Benfica	2–0	Sporting CP	Lisbon
20:15	Gaitán 28'; Pérez 76'	Report		Stadium: Estádio da Luz; Attendance: 48,965; Referee: Marco Ferreira

15 February 2014 19	Sporting CP	1–0	Olhanense	Lisbon
20:15	Mané 14'	Report		Stadium: Estádio José Alvalade; Attendance: 29,255; Referee: Hugo Miguel

22 February 2014 20	Rio Ave	1–2	Sporting CP	Vila do Conde
20:15	Maurício 48' (o.g.)	Report	Slimani 70'; Mané 85'	Stadium: Estádio do Rio Ave FC; Attendance: 4,995; Referee: Jorge Ferreira

1 March 2014 21	Sporting CP	2–1	Braga	Lisbon
20:15	Jefferson 70'; Slimani 74'	Report	Patrício 37' (o.g.)	Stadium: Estádio José Alvalade; Attendance: 30,294; Referee: Artur Soares Dias

9 March 2014 22	Vitória de Setúbal	2–2	Sporting CP	Setúbal
17:00	Martins 51'; Horta 88'	Report	Slimani 34'; A. Silva 86'	Stadium: Estádio do Bonfim; Attendance: 11,136; Referee: Vasco Santos

16 March 2014 23	Sporting CP	1–0	Porto	Lisbon
19:15	Slimani 52'	Report		Stadium: Estádio José Alvalade; Attendance: 36,692; Referee: Pedro Proença

22 March 2014 24	Marítimo	1–3	Sporting CP	Funchal
19:00	Weeks 6'	Report	A. Silva 3'; Carvalho 38'; Jefferson 86'	Stadium: Estádio dos Barreiros; Attendance: 4,600; Referee: Jorge Sousa

29 March 2014 25	Sporting CP	1–0	Vitória de Guimarães	Lisbon
20:15	Rojo 48'	Report		Stadium: Estádio José Alvalade; Attendance: 35,674; Referee: Nuno Almeida

5 April 2014 26	Paços de Ferreira	1–3	Sporting CP	Paços de Ferreira
20:15	Bebé 54'	Report	Carvalho 14'; A. Silva 66'; Rojo 78'	Stadium: Estádio da Mata Real; Attendance: 4,155; Referee: Carlos Xistra

12 April 2014 27	Sporting CP	2–0	Gil Vicente	Lisbon
20:15	Slimani 1'; Héldon 90+2'	Report		Stadium: Estádio José Alvalade; Attendance: 32,962; Referee: Bruno Esteves

19 April 2014 28	Belenenses	0–1	Sporting CP	Lisbon
19:15		Report	A. Silva 52'	Stadium: Estádio do Restelo; Attendance: 7,236; Referee: Cosme Machado

3 May 2014 29	Nacional	1–1	Sporting CP	Funchal
18:30	Barcelos 76'	Report	Campos 39' (o.g.)	Stadium: Estádio da Madeira; Attendance: 4,427; Referee: Rui Costa

11 May 2014 30	Sporting CP	0–1	Estoril	Lisbon
16:00		Report	Evandro 5'	Stadium: Estádio José Alvalade; Attendance: 36,964; Referee: Jorge Ferreira

=== Taça de Portugal ===
20 October 2013 Third round	Sporting CP	8–1	Alba	Lisbon
18:00	Eduardo 16'; Rojo 20'; Montero 31', 57', 89'; Capel 59'; V. Silva 67'; Slimani 86'		Pesquina 73'	Stadium: Estádio José Alvalade; Attendance: 20,498; Referee: Nuno Almeida

9 November 2013 Fourth round	Benfica	4–3	Sporting CP	Lisbon
19:45	Cardozo 12', 42', 45'; Luisão 97'	Report	Capel 37'; Maurício 62'; Slimani 90+2'	Stadium: Estádio da Luz; Attendance: 47,156; Referee: Duarte Gomes

=== Taça da Liga ===
==== Group stage ====
Pos	Team	Pld	W	D	L	GF	GA	GD	Pts	Qualification
1	Porto	3	2	1	0	7	2	+5	7	Advance to knockout phase
2	Sporting CP	3	2	1	0	6	1	+5	7	
3	Marítimo	3	0	1	2	2	6	−4	1	
4	Penafiel	3	0	1	2	1	7	−6	1	

29 December 2013	Sporting CP	0–0	Porto	Lisbon
20:45		Report		Stadium: Estádio José Alvalade; Attendance: 21,505; Referee: Olegário Benquerença

14 January 2013	Sporting CP	3–0	Marítimo	Lisbon
19:45	Mané 18'; V. Silva 49'; Rojo 84'	Report		Stadium: Estádio José Alvalade; Referee: Nuno Almeida

25 January 2013	Penafiel	1–3	Sporting CP	Penafiel
16:00	Aldair 19'	Report	Mané 44'; Eduardo 68'; A. Silva 81'	Stadium: Estádio Municipal 25 de Abril

== Squad statistics ==
Pos.	No.	Name	Primeira Liga		Taça de Portugal		Taça da Liga		Discipline	
Pos.	No.	Name	Apps	Goals	Apps	Goals	Apps	Goals	Yellow card	Red card
GK	1	(Portugal) Rui Patrício	30	0	1	0	0	0	3	0
GK	22	(Brazil) Marcelo Boeck	0	0	1	0	3	0	0	0
DF	2	(Brazil) Weldinho	0	0	0	0	0	0	0	0
DF	3	(Brazil) Maurício	28	1	2	1	1	0	10	0
DF	4	(Brazil) Jefferson	26	2	1	0	3	0	8	0
DF	5	(Argentina) Marcos Rojo	25	4	2	1	2	1	8	3
DF	15	(England) Eric Dier	8(5)	0	0	0	3	0	0	0
DF	30	(Paraguay) Iván Piris	6	0	2	0	0	0	2	0
DF	41	(Portugal) Cédric	28	1	0	0	3	0	12	0
DF	35	(Portugal) Rúben Semedo	0	0	0 (1)	0	0	0	0	0
MF	6	(Portugal) Vítor Silva	1 (7)	0	1	1	2 (1)	1	0	0
MF	8	(Portugal) André Martins	24 (3)	3	1	0	1	0	2	0
MF	10	(Brazil) Gérson Magrão	4 (5)	0	1	0	0 (1)	0	2	0
MF	14	(Portugal) William Carvalho	29	4	1	0	3	0	10	0
MF	21	(Argentina) Fabián Rinaudo	0 (3)	0	1	0	0	0	0	0
MF	23	(Portugal) Adrien Silva	28	8	2	0	3	1	11	0
FW	11	(Spain) Diego Capel	17(9)	1	1 (1)	2	2 (1)	0	3	0
FW	17	(Colombia) Fredy Montero	21 (8)	13	2	3	1 (1)	0	8	0
FW	18	(Peru) André Carrillo	17 (10)	2	1 (1)	0	1 (2)	0	6	0
FW	28	(Portugal) Wilson Eduardo	12 (8)	2	2	1	1 (1)	1	2	0
FW	92	(Guinea) Salim Cissé	0	0	0	0	0	0	0	0
FW	9	(Algeria) Islam Slimani	10 (16)	8	0 (2)	2	2	0	4	0
FW	36	(Portugal) Carlos Mané	9 (9)	2	0 (1)	0	2	2	1	0
FW	25	(Portugal) Diogo Salomão	1 (2)	0	0	0	0 (1)	0	0	0
FW	20	(Cape Verde) Héldon	6 (4)	1	0	0	0	0	0	0
FW	7	(Egypt) Shikabala	0 (1)	0	0	0	0	0	0	0

== Players ==
=== Current squad ===
Note: Flags indicate national team as defined under FIFA eligibility rules; some limited exceptions apply. Players may hold more than one non-FIFA nationality.

No.	Pos.	Nation	Player
1	GK	(Portugal) POR	Rui Patrício (captain)
2	DF	(Brazil) BRA	Weldinho
3	DF	(Brazil) BRA	Maurício
4	DF	(Brazil) BRA	Jefferson
5	DF	(Argentina) ARG	Marcos Rojo
6	MF	(Portugal) POR	Vítor Silva
8	MF	(Portugal) POR	André Martins
9	FW	(Algeria) ALG	Islam Slimani
10	MF	(Brazil) BRA	Gérson Magrão
11	MF	(Spain) ESP	Diego Capel
14	MF	(Portugal) POR	William Carvalho

No.	Pos.	Nation	Player
15	DF	(England) ENG	Eric Dier
17	FW	(Colombia) COL	Fredy Montero (on loan from Seattle Sounders FC)
18	MF	(Peru) PER	André Carrillo
21	MF	(Argentina) ARG	Fabián Rinaudo (vice-captain)
22	GK	(Brazil) BRA	Marcelo Boeck
23	MF	(Portugal) POR	Adrien Silva
28	FW	(Portugal) POR	Wilson Eduardo
30	DF	(Paraguay) PAR	Iván Piris
41	DF	(Portugal) POR	Cédric
92	FW	(Guinea) GUI	Salim Cissé

== Transfers ==
=== In ===
Note: Flags indicate national team as defined under FIFA eligibility rules; some limited exceptions apply. Players may hold more than one non-FIFA nationality.

No.	Pos.	Nation	Player
—	DF	(Brazil) BRA	Jefferson (from (Portugal) Estoril – €400,000)
—	DF	(Brazil) BRA	Maurício (from (Brazil) Sport Recife – free)
—	DF	(Portugal) POR	Hugo Sousa (from (Cyprus) AEP Paphos – free)
—	DF	(Brazil) BRA	Weldinho (from (Brazil) Palmeiras – on loan)

No.	Pos.	Nation	Player
—	DF	(Denmark) DEN	Seejou King (from (Denmark) Nordsjælland – free)
—	FW	(Colombia) COL	Fredy Montero (from (United States) Seattle Sounders FC – on loan)
—	FW	(Guinea) GUI	Salim Cissé (from (Portugal) Académica – €200,000)
—	DF	(Egypt) EGY	Ramy Rabia (from (Egypt) Al-Ahly – €750,000)

=== Out ===
Note: Flags indicate national team as defined under FIFA eligibility rules; some limited exceptions apply. Players may hold more than one non-FIFA nationality.

No.	Pos.	Nation	Player
—	DF	(Portugal) POR	Pedro Mendes (to (Italy) Parma – free)
—	FW	(Netherlands) NED	Ricky van Wolfswinkel (to (England) Norwich City – €10,000,000)
—	FW	(Portugal) POR	Jorge Chula (to (Portugal) Marítimo – free)
—	MF	(Switzerland) SUI	Gelson Fernandes (to (Germany) SC Freiburg – €500,000)
—	MF	(Portugal) POR	Luís Cortez (to (Portugal) Belenenses – free)

No.	Pos.	Nation	Player
—	MF	(Netherlands) NED	Stijn Schaars (to (Netherlands) PSV – undisclosed)
—	DF	(Colombia) COL	Santiago Arias (to (Netherlands) PSV – undisclosed)
—	DF	(Portugal) POR	Tiago Ilori (to (England) Liverpool – €8,250,000)
—	FW	(Portugal) POR	Bruma (to (Turkey) Galatasaray – €10,000,000)
—	DF	(Netherlands) NED	Khalid Boulahrouz (contract terminated)

=== Out on loan ===
Note: Flags indicate national team as defined under FIFA eligibility rules; some limited exceptions apply. Players may hold more than one non-FIFA nationality.

No. / Pos. / Nation / Player; — / MF / (Brazil) BRA / Renato Neto (to (Belgium) Gent)	No. / Pos. / Nation / Player; — / DF / (Portugal) POR / Miguel Lopes (to (France) Lyon)
