= 2015 Copa América knockout stage =

Football tournament knockout stage

The knockout stage of the 2015 Copa América began on 24 June and concluded with the final on 4 July 2015. A total of eight teams competed in the knockout stage.

== Qualified teams ==
The top two placed teams from each of the three groups, plus the two best-placed third teams, qualified for the knockout stage.

Group	Winners	Runners-up	Third-placed team (Best two qualify)
A	Chile	Bolivia	—N/a
B	Argentina	Paraguay	Uruguay
C	Brazil	Peru	Colombia

== Bracket ==
In the knockout stage, the eight teams played a single-elimination tournament, with the following rules:

- In the quarter-finals, teams from the same group could not play each other.
- In the quarter-finals, semi-finals, and third place playoff, if tied after 90 minutes, a penalty shoot-out was used to determine the winner (no extra time was played).
- In the final, if tied after 90 minutes, 30 minutes of extra time were played. If still tied after extra time, a penalty shoot-out was used to determine the winner.

Quarter-finals
24 June – Santiago (EN)
Chile	1
Uruguay	0
25 June – Temuco
Bolivia	1
Peru	3
26 June – Viña del Mar
Argentina (p)	0 (5)
Colombia	0 (4)
27 June – Concepción
Brazil	1 (3)
Paraguay (p)	1 (4)

Semi-finals
29 June – Santiago (EN)
Chile	2
Peru	1
30 June – Concepción
Argentina	6
Paraguay	1

Final
4 July – Santiago (EN)
Chile (p)	0 (4)
Argentina	0 (1)
Third place play-off
3 July – Concepción
Peru	2
Paraguay	0

Results decided after extra time are indicated by (a.e.t.), and results decided via a penalty shoot-out are indicated by (p).

All times local, CLT (UTC−3).

== Quarter-finals ==
=== Chile vs Uruguay ===
24 June 2015
20:30

Chile	1–0	Uruguay
Isla 80'	Report

Estadio Nacional, Santiago
Attendance: 45,304
Referee: Sandro Ricci (Brazil)

Chile	Uruguay

GK	1	Claudio Bravo (c)
RB	4	Mauricio Isla	(yellow card) 43'
CB	17	Gary Medel
CB	18	Gonzalo Jara	(yellow card) 63'
LB	2	Eugenio Mena
RM	20	Charles Aránguiz
CM	21	Marcelo Díaz		(substituted off) 71'
LM	8	Arturo Vidal
AM	10	Jorge Valdivia	(yellow card) 18'	(substituted off) 85'
CF	11	Eduardo Vargas		(substituted off) 71'
CF	7	Alexis Sánchez
Substitutions:
FW	9	Mauricio Pinilla	(yellow card) 84'	(substituted on) 71'
MF	14	Matías Fernández		(substituted on) 71'
MF	16	David Pizarro		(substituted on) 85'
Manager:
(Argentina) Jorge Sampaoli

GK	1	Fernando Muslera
RB	16	Maxi Pereira	(yellow card) 67'
CB	2	José Giménez
CB	3	Diego Godín (c)
LB	4	Jorge Fucile	(yellow card) 40' (yellow-red card) 88'
RM	5	Carlos Sánchez		(substituted off) 85'
CM	20	Álvaro González
CM	17	Egidio Arévalo
LM	7	Cristian Rodríguez
CF	9	Diego Rolán		(substituted off) 58'
CF	21	Edinson Cavani	(yellow card) 29' (yellow-red card) 63'
Substitutions:
FW	8	Abel Hernández		(substituted on) 58'
FW	22	Jonathan Rodríguez		(substituted on) 85'
Manager:
Óscar Tabárez				(red card) 90+3'

Man of the Match:
Alexis Sánchez (Chile)

Assistant referees:
Emerson De Carvalho (Brazil)
Fabio Pereira (Brazil)
Fourth official:
Carlos Vera (Ecuador)
Fifth official:
Byron Romero (Ecuador)

=== Bolivia vs Peru ===
25 June 2015
20:30

Bolivia	1–3	Peru
Moreno 83' (pen.)	Report	Guerrero 19', 22', 73'

Estadio Municipal Germán Becker, Temuco
Attendance: 16,872
Referee: Wilmar Roldán (Colombia)

Bolivia	Peru

GK	1	Romel Quiñónez
CB	22	Edward Zenteno
CB	16	Ronald Raldes (c)
CB	21	Cristian Coimbra	(yellow card) 76'
RWB	2	Miguel Hurtado		(substituted off) 46'
LWB	4	Leonel Morales		(substituted off) 46'
RM	3	Alejandro Chumacero
CM	6	Danny Bejarano	(yellow card) 35'
LM	8	Martin Smedberg-Dalence
CF	7	Alcides Peña		(substituted off) 68'
CF	9	Marcelo Moreno	(yellow card) 86'
Substitutions:
FW	10	Pablo Escobar	(yellow card) 69'	(substituted on) 46'
MF	11	Damián Lizio		(substituted on) 46'
FW	18	Ricardo Pedriel	(yellow card) 73'	(substituted on) 68'
Manager:
Mauricio Soria

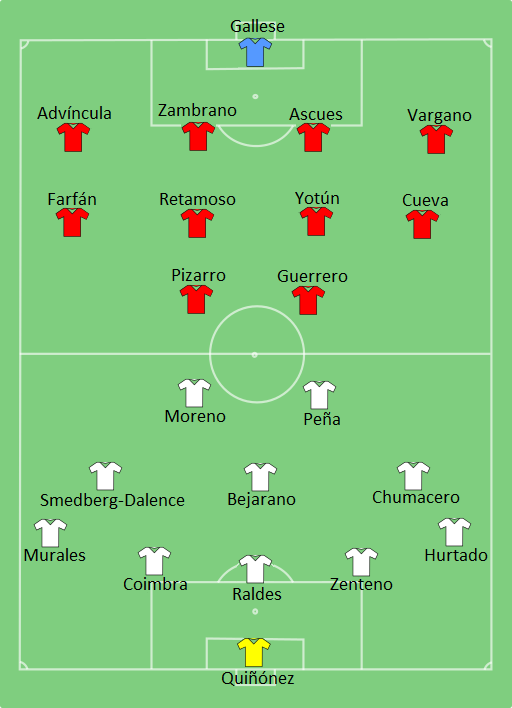

GK	1	Pedro Gallese	(yellow card) 61'
RB	17	Luis Advíncula	(yellow card) 32'
CB	5	Carlos Zambrano
CB	22	Carlos Ascues
LB	6	Juan Manuel Vargas
RM	10	Jefferson Farfán		(substituted off) 77'
CM	13	Edwin Retamoso
CM	19	Yoshimar Yotún	(yellow card) 89'
LM	8	Christian Cueva		(substituted off) 82'
CF	14	Claudio Pizarro (c)		(substituted off) 66'
CF	9	Paolo Guerrero
Substitutions:
FW	18	André Carrillo		(substituted on) 66'
MF	7	Paolo Hurtado		(substituted on) 77'
FW	11	Yordy Reyna	(yellow card) 90+4'	(substituted on) 82'
Manager:
(Argentina) Ricardo Gareca

Man of the Match:
Paolo Guerrero (Peru)

Assistant referees:
Alexander Guzmán (Colombia)
Cristian De La Cruz (Colombia)
Fourth official:
Enrique Cáceres (Paraguay)
Fifth official:
Christian Lescano (Ecuador)

=== Argentina vs Colombia ===
26 June 2015
20:30

Argentina	0–0	Colombia
	Report
Penalties
Messi (penalty scored); Garay (penalty scored); Banega (penalty scored); Lavezzi (penalty scored); Biglia (penalty missed); Rojo (penalty missed); Tevez (penalty scored)	5–4	(penalty scored) Rodríguez; (penalty scored) Falcao; (penalty scored) Cuadrado; (penalty missed) Muriel; (penalty scored) Cardona; (penalty missed) Zúñiga; (penalty missed) Murillo

Estadio Sausalito, Viña del Mar
Attendance: 21,508
Referee: Roberto García (Mexico)

Argentina	Colombia

GK	1	Sergio Romero
RB	4	Pablo Zabaleta
CB	2	Ezequiel Garay
CB	17	Nicolás Otamendi
LB	16	Marcos Rojo
RM	6	Lucas Biglia
CM	14	Javier Mascherano	(yellow card) 34'
LM	21	Javier Pastore		(substituted off) 77'
RW	10	Lionel Messi (c)	(yellow card) 90+1'
CF	11	Sergio Agüero	(yellow card) 20'	(substituted off) 73'
LW	7	Ángel Di María		(substituted off) 87'
Substitutions:
FW	18	Carlos Tevez		(substituted on) 73'
MF	19	Éver Banega		(substituted on) 77'
FW	22	Ezequiel Lavezzi		(substituted on) 87'
Manager:
Gerardo Martino

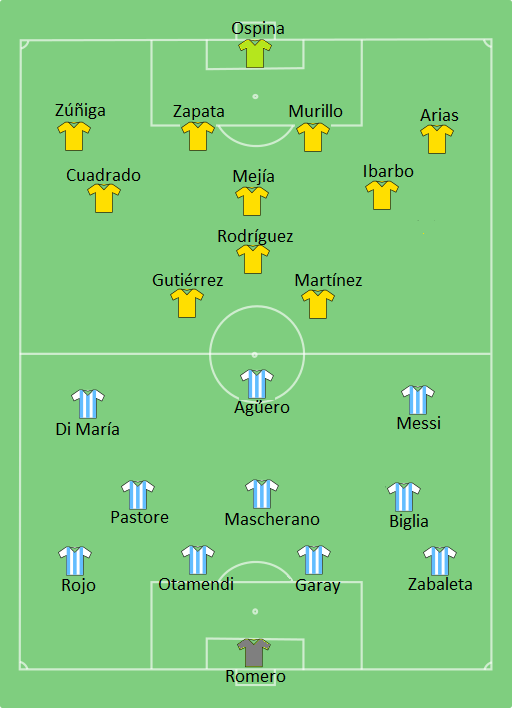

GK	1	David Ospina
RB	18	Juan Camilo Zúñiga
CB	2	Cristián Zapata
CB	22	Jeison Murillo
LB	4	Santiago Arias	(yellow card) 37'
RM	11	Juan Cuadrado	(yellow card) 41'
CM	15	Alexander Mejía	(yellow card) 21'
LM	16	Víctor Ibarbo		(substituted off) 85'
AM	10	James Rodríguez (c)	(yellow card) 12'
CF	19	Teófilo Gutiérrez		(substituted off) 24'
CF	21	Jackson Martínez		(substituted off) 74'
Substitutions:
MF	8	Edwin Cardona		(substituted on) 24'
FW	9	Radamel Falcao	(yellow card) 86'	(substituted on) 74'
FW	20	Luis Muriel		(substituted on) 85'
Manager:
(Argentina) José Pékerman

Man of the Match:
Lionel Messi (Argentina)

Assistant referees:
José Luis Camargo (Mexico)
Marvin Torrentera (Mexico)
Fourth official:
Raúl Orosco (Bolivia)
Fifth official:
Juan P. Montaño (Bolivia)

=== Brazil vs Paraguay ===
27 June 2015
18:30

Brazil	1–1	Paraguay
Robinho 14'	Report	González 71' (pen.)
Penalties
Fernandinho (penalty scored); Ribeiro (penalty missed); Miranda (penalty scored); Douglas Costa (penalty missed); Coutinho (penalty scored)	3–4	(penalty scored) Martínez; (penalty scored) V. Cáceres; (penalty scored) Bobadilla; (penalty missed) Santa Cruz; (penalty scored) González

Estadio Municipal de Concepción, Concepción
Attendance: 29,276
Referee: Andrés Cunha (Uruguay)

Brazil	Paraguay

GK	1	Jefferson
RB	2	Dani Alves	(yellow card) 51'
CB	14	Thiago Silva
CB	3	Miranda (c)
LB	6	Filipe Luís
RM	19	Willian		(substituted off) 60'
CM	5	Fernandinho
CM	8	Elias
LM	21	Philippe Coutinho	(yellow card) 76'
CF	11	Roberto Firmino		(substituted off) 69'
CF	20	Robinho		(substituted off) 87'
Substitutions:
MF	7	Douglas Costa		(substituted on) 60'
FW	9	Diego Tardelli		(substituted on) 69'
MF	18	Éverton Ribeiro		(substituted on) 87'
Manager:
Dunga

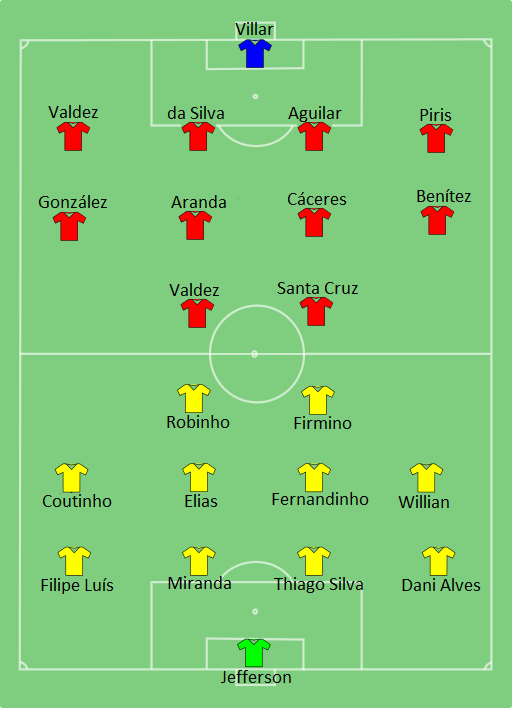

GK	1	Justo Villar
RB	5	Bruno Valdez	(yellow card) 25'
CB	14	Paulo da Silva
CB	4	Pablo Aguilar	(yellow card) 38'
LB	2	Iván Piris
RM	10	Derlis González
CM	22	Eduardo Aranda		(substituted off) 77'
CM	15	Víctor Cáceres
LM	11	Édgar Benítez		(substituted off) 84'
CF	18	Nelson Valdez		(substituted off) 74'
CF	9	Roque Santa Cruz (c)
Substitutions:
FW	7	Raúl Bobadilla		(substituted on) 74'
MF	17	Osvaldo Martínez	(yellow card) 81'	(substituted on) 77'
MF	21	Óscar Romero		(substituted on) 84'
Manager:
(Argentina) Ramón Díaz

Man of the Match:
Nelson Valdez (Paraguay)

Assistant referees:
Mauricio Espinosa (Uruguay)
Carlos Pastorino (Uruguay)
Fourth official:
José Argote (Venezuela)
Fifth official:
Jorge Urrego (Venezuela)

== Semi-finals ==
=== Chile vs Peru ===
29 June 2015
20:30

Chile	2–1	Peru
Vargas 41', 63'	Report	Medel 60' (o.g.)

Estadio Nacional, Santiago
Attendance: 45,651
Referee: José Argote (Venezuela)

Chile	Peru

GK	1	Claudio Bravo (c)
RB	4	Mauricio Isla
CB	17	Gary Medel
CB	13	José Rojas
LB	3	Miiko Albornoz	(substituted off) 46'
RM	8	Arturo Vidal
CM	21	Marcelo Díaz	(substituted off) 46'
LM	20	Charles Aránguiz
AM	10	Jorge Valdivia	(substituted off) 86'
CF	11	Eduardo Vargas
CF	7	Alexis Sánchez
Substitutions:
DF	2	Eugenio Mena	(substituted on) 46'
MF	16	David Pizarro	(substituted on) 46'
MF	19	Felipe Gutiérrez	(substituted on) 86'
Manager:
(Argentina) Jorge Sampaoli

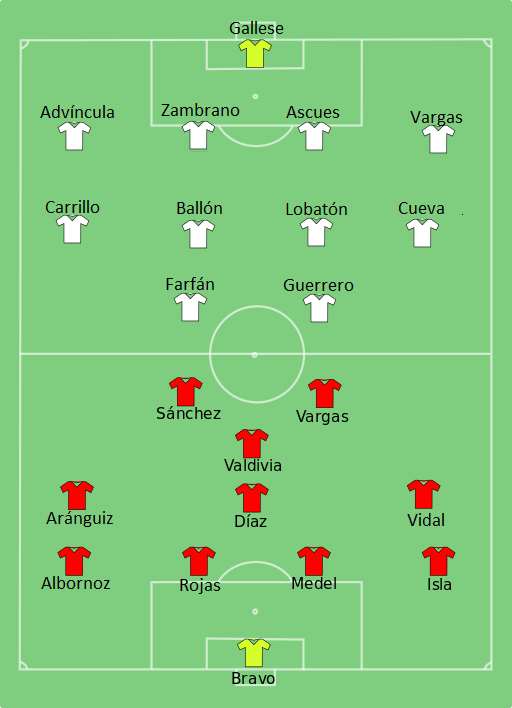

GK	1	Pedro Gallese
RB	17	Luis Advíncula
CB	5	Carlos Zambrano	(yellow card) 7'	(red card) 21'
CB	22	Carlos Ascues
LB	6	Juan Manuel Vargas
RM	18	André Carrillo		(substituted off) 73'
CM	21	Josepmir Ballón
CM	16	Carlos Lobatón (c)		(substituted off) 74'
LM	8	Christian Cueva		(substituted off) 29'
CF	10	Jefferson Farfán
CF	9	Paolo Guerrero
Substitutions:
DF	15	Christian Ramos		(substituted on) 29'
FW	14	Claudio Pizarro		(substituted on) 73'
DF	19	Yoshimar Yotún		(substituted on) 74'
Manager:
(Argentina) Ricardo Gareca

Man of the Match:
Eduardo Vargas (Chile)

Assistant referees:
Jorge Urrego (Venezuela)
Byron Romero (Ecuador)
Fourth official:
Raúl Orosco (Bolivia)
Fifth official:
Javier Bustillos (Bolivia)

=== Argentina vs Paraguay ===
30 June 2015
20:30

Argentina	6–1	Paraguay
Rojo 14'; Pastore 26'; Di María 46', 52'; Agüero 79'; Higuaín 82'	Report	Barrios 42'

Estadio Municipal de Concepción, Concepción
Attendance: 29,205
Referee: Sandro Ricci (Brazil)

Argentina	Paraguay

GK	1	Sergio Romero
RB	4	Pablo Zabaleta
CB	15	Martín Demichelis
CB	17	Nicolás Otamendi
LB	16	Marcos Rojo	(yellow card) 12'
RM	6	Lucas Biglia	(yellow card) 13'
CM	14	Javier Mascherano		(substituted off) 77'
LM	21	Javier Pastore		(substituted off) 73'
RW	10	Lionel Messi (c)
CF	11	Sergio Agüero		(substituted off) 81'
LW	7	Ángel Di María
Substitutions:
MF	19	Éver Banega		(substituted on) 73'
MF	5	Fernando Gago		(substituted on) 77'
FW	9	Gonzalo Higuaín		(substituted on) 81'
Manager:
Gerardo Martino

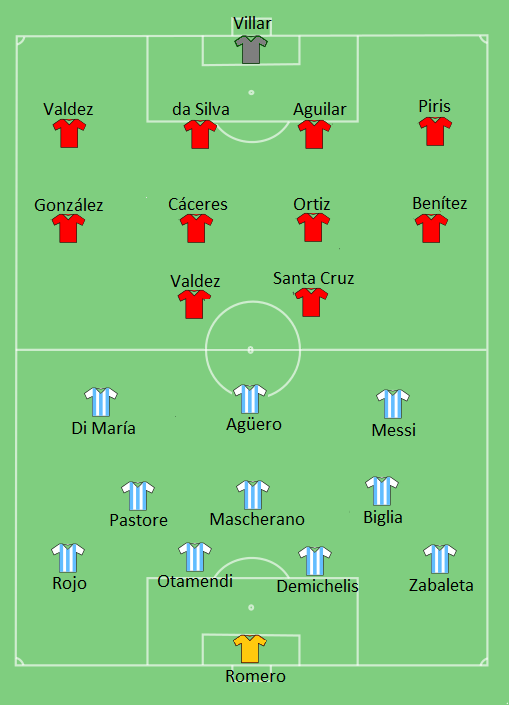

GK	1	Justo Villar
RB	5	Bruno Valdez
CB	14	Paulo da Silva	(yellow card) 30'
CB	4	Pablo Aguilar
LB	2	Iván Piris
RM	10	Derlis González		(substituted off) 26'
CM	15	Víctor Cáceres	(yellow card) 13'
CM	13	Richard Ortiz	(yellow card) 60'
LM	11	Édgar Benítez
CF	18	Nelson Valdez		(substituted off) 56'
CF	9	Roque Santa Cruz (c)		(substituted off) 30'
Substitutions:
FW	7	Raúl Bobadilla		(substituted on) 26'
FW	8	Lucas Barrios		(substituted on) 30'
MF	21	Óscar Romero		(substituted on) 56'
Manager:
(Argentina) Ramón Díaz

Man of the Match:
Lionel Messi (Argentina)

Assistant referees:
Emerson de Carvalho (Brazil)
Fábio Pereira (Brazil)
Fourth official:
Wilmar Roldán (Colombia)
Fifth official:
Cristian De La Cruz (Colombia)

== Third place play-off ==
3 July 2015
20:30

Peru	2–0	Paraguay
Carrillo 47'; Guerrero 88'	Report

Estadio Municipal de Concepción, Concepción
Attendance: 29,143
Referee: Raúl Orosco (Bolivia)

Peru	Paraguay

GK	1	Pedro Gallese
RB	17	Luis Advíncula
CB	15	Christian Ramos
CB	22	Carlos Ascues
LB	6	Juan Manuel Vargas
RM	18	André Carrillo		(substituted off) 90+1'
CM	21	Josepmir Ballón
CM	16	Carlos Lobatón (c)		(substituted off) 58'
LM	8	Christian Cueva
CF	11	Yordy Reyna		(substituted off) 84'
CF	9	Paolo Guerrero
Substitutions:
DF	19	Yoshimar Yotún	(yellow card) 85'	(substituted on) 58'
MF	20	Joel Sánchez	(yellow card) 88'	(substituted on) 84'
MF	7	Paolo Hurtado		(substituted on) 90+1'
Manager:
(Argentina) Ricardo Gareca

GK	1	Justo Villar (c)
RB	3	Marcos Cáceres		(substituted off) 59'
CB	14	Paulo da Silva
CB	4	Pablo Aguilar
LB	6	Miguel Samudio	(yellow card) 38'
RM	17	Osvaldo Martínez		(substituted off) 57'
CM	15	Víctor Cáceres
CM	20	Néstor Ortigoza		(substituted off) 64'
LM	21	Óscar Romero
CF	7	Raúl Bobadilla
CF	8	Lucas Barrios
Substitutions:
FW	11	Édgar Benítez		(substituted on) 57'
MF	22	Eduardo Aranda		(substituted on) 59'
MF	13	Richard Ortiz		(substituted on) 64'
Manager:
(Argentina) Ramón Díaz

Man of the Match:
Paolo Guerrero (Peru)

Assistant referees:
Javier Bustillos (Bolivia)
Juan P. Montaño (Bolivia)
Fourth official:
Andrés Cunha (Uruguay)
Fifth official:
Mauricio Espinosa (Uruguay)

== Final ==
4 July 2015
17:00

Chile	0–0 (a.e.t.)	Argentina
	Report
Penalties
Fernández (penalty scored); Vidal (penalty scored); Aránguiz (penalty scored); Sánchez (penalty scored)	4–1	(penalty scored) Messi; (penalty missed) Higuaín; (penalty missed) Banega

Estadio Nacional, Santiago
Attendance: 45,693
Referee: Wilmar Roldán (Colombia)

Chile	Argentina

GK	1	Claudio Bravo (c)
CB	5	Francisco Silva	(yellow card) 24'
CB	21	Marcelo Díaz	(yellow card) 34'
CB	17	Gary Medel	(yellow card) 44'
RM	4	Mauricio Isla
CM	20	Charles Aránguiz	(yellow card) 87'
CM	8	Arturo Vidal
LM	15	Jean Beausejour
AM	10	Jorge Valdivia		(substituted off) 75'
CF	11	Eduardo Vargas		(substituted off) 95'
CF	7	Alexis Sánchez
Substitutes:
MF	14	Matías Fernández		(substituted on) 75'
FW	22	Ángelo Henríquez		(substituted on) 95'
Manager:
(Argentina) Jorge Sampaoli

GK	1	Sergio Romero
RB	4	Pablo Zabaleta
CB	15	Martín Demichelis
CB	17	Nicolás Otamendi
LB	16	Marcos Rojo	(yellow card) 55'
CM	6	Lucas Biglia
CM	14	Javier Mascherano	(yellow card) 56'
RW	10	Lionel Messi (c)
AM	21	Javier Pastore		(substituted off) 81'
LW	7	Ángel Di María		(substituted off) 29'
CF	11	Sergio Agüero		(substituted off) 74'
Substitutes:
FW	22	Ezequiel Lavezzi		(substituted on) 29'
FW	9	Gonzalo Higuaín		(substituted on) 74'
MF	19	Éver Banega	(yellow card) 91'	(substituted on) 81'
Manager:
Gerardo Martino

Man of the Match:
Arturo Vidal (Chile)

Assistant referees:
Alexander Guzmán (Colombia)
Cristian De La Cruz (Colombia)
Fourth official:
José Argote (Venezuela)
Fifth official:
Christian Lescano (Ecuador)
