= Marcos Rojo =

Argentine footballer (born 1990)

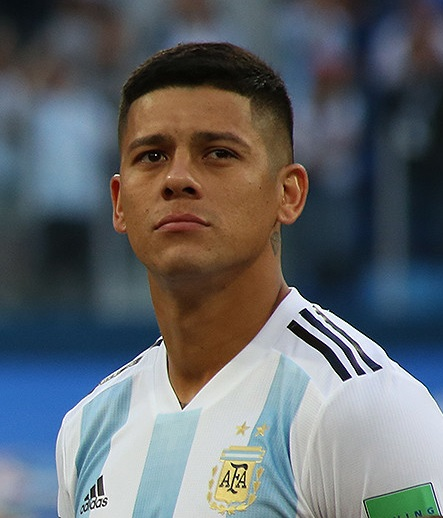
- Rojo with Argentina at the 2018 FIFA World Cup

Personal information
- Full name: Faustino Marcos Alberto Rojo
- Date of birth: 20 March 1990 (age 36)
- Place of birth: La Plata, Argentina
- Height: 1.86 m (6 ft 1 in)
- Position: Defender

Team information
- Current team: Estudiantes
- Number: 5

Youth career
- 2000–2008: Estudiantes

Senior career*
| Years | Team | Apps | (Gls) |
| 2008–2011 | Estudiantes | 43 | (3) |
| 2011–2012 | Spartak Moscow | 8 | (0) |
| 2012–2014 | Sporting CP | 49 | (5) |
| 2014–2021 | Manchester United | 76 | (1) |
| 2020 | → Estudiantes (loan) | 1 | (0) |
| 2021–2025 | Boca Juniors | 83 | (8) |
| 2025–2026 | Racing Club | 20 | (1) |
| 2026– | Estudiantes | 3 | (0) |

International career
| 2011–2019 | Argentina | 61 | (3) |
Medal record
Men's football
Representing Argentina
FIFA World Cup
| Runner-up | 2014 Brazil |
Copa América
| Runner-up | 2015 Chile |
| Runner-up | 2016 United States |
- * Club domestic league appearances and goals as of 17:18, 21 November 2026 (UTC)

Faustino Marcos Alberto Rojo (born 20 March 1990) is an Argentine professional footballer who plays as a defender for Argentine Primera División club Estudiantes. Mainly a centre-back, he can also play as a left-back.

Rojo began his career at local club Estudiantes, where he won the Copa Libertadores in 2009, played in the FIFA Club World Cup Final later that year and won the Primera División in 2010. After a short spell with Spartak Moscow, he joined Sporting CP in 2012, and transferred to Manchester United for £16 million two years later. He won four trophies with the English club: the FA Cup in 2015–16 and the FA Community Shield, EFL Cup and UEFA Europa League in 2016–17. After falling out of favour at Manchester United, Rojo returned to Estudiantes on loan in January 2020, before making a permanent transfer to Boca Juniors in February 2021.

Rojo made his first appearance for Argentina in 2011 and earned 61 caps over eight years. He was part of their side which reached the 2014 FIFA World Cup Final. He was also a Copa América runner-up in 2015 and 2016 and took part in the 2018 FIFA World Cup.

== Club career ==
=== Estudiantes LP ===
Rojo grew up in La Plata, Argentina and joined his local side Estudiantes at the age of ten.

In 2009, he was promoted to the club's main team, after signing his first professional contract. He spent three years with the club, making 43 appearances and scoring three goals for the team. He played in the 2009 FIFA Club World Cup Final, coming on for extra time as Estudiantes lost 2–1 to Barcelona in Dubai.

During his time at Estudiantes, Rojo won a Copa Libertadores and an Argentine Primera División title. The defender spent most matches as a left-back and developed a reputation as a capable attacker, scoring his first goal in a 2–1 defeat against LDU Quito in the 2010 Recopa Sudamericana.

=== Spartak Moscow ===
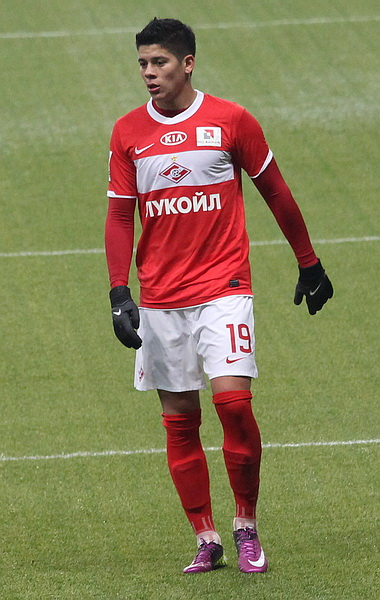
Rojo playing for Spartak Moscow in 2011

In December 2010, Rojo signed a five-year contract with Spartak Moscow. He scored his only goal for Spartak on 20 April 2011, netting the opening goal of a 2–1 defeat of Krasnodar in the quarter-finals of the Russian Cup.

=== Sporting CP ===
In July 2012, Rojo moved from Spartak Moscow to Sporting CP for £3.5 million, signing a four-year contract. Rojo made his Primeira Liga debut for Sporting on 19 August 2012, playing the entire match and receiving a yellow card in a 0–0 draw with Vitória de Guimarães. He received his first red card for Sporting in a league match against Porto on 7 October 2012, picking up two cautions within three minutes as Sporting fell to a 2–0 defeat. He scored his first goal for Sporting on 28 April 2013, netting the winner against Nacional. Rojo played mostly at centre-back in his first season in Portugal, occasionally at left-back, as the team had a comparatively bad season, finishing seventh in the league.

In the second league match of the 2013–14 season, Rojo scored his first goal of the season, netting Sporting's second goal in their 4–0 win over Académica de Coimbra. On 19 April 2014, Rojo was sent off in a Primeira Liga match against Belenenses, but Sporting held on for a 1–0 win. In an improved season, he contributed six goals as Sporting finished as runners-up.

On 13 August 2014, it was announced that Rojo was being disciplined by his club over his refusal to train after handing in a transfer request to force through a move to Premier League club Manchester United. Sporting president Bruno de Carvalho later alleged that third-party owners of Rojo who were not representatives of Manchester United had pressured his club into selling the player.

=== Manchester United ===
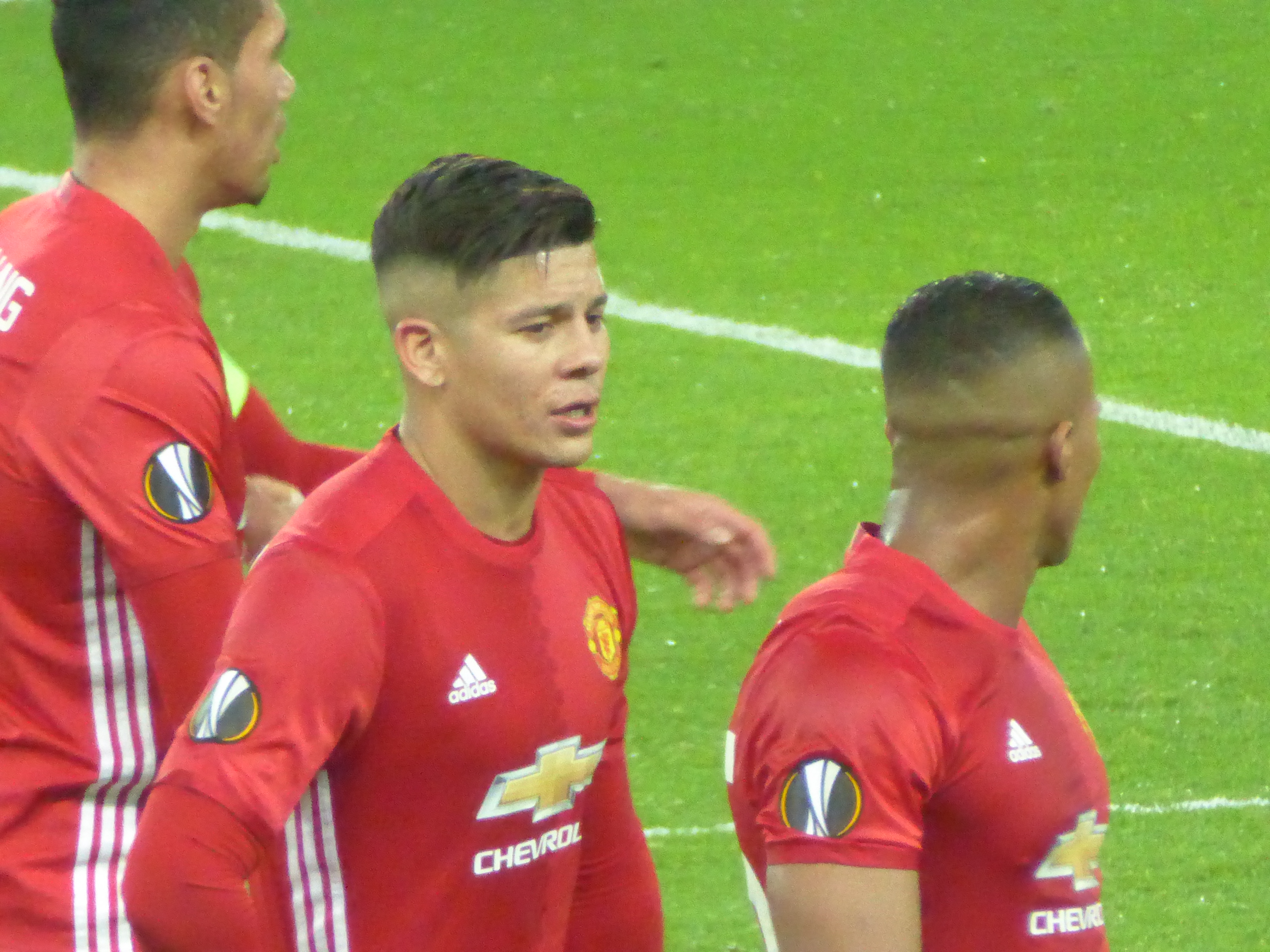
Rojo (centre) in a Europa League match against FC Rostov in 2017

On 19 August 2014, an agreement to sell Rojo for €20 million (£16 million) was announced by both Sporting and Manchester United. The next day, United announced that they had signed him on a five-year contract, with Nani moving to Sporting on a season-long loan. Rojo stated that it was a "dream for me" to play with Manchester United.

Rojo missed three matches for United due to difficulties in gaining a work permit, because of pending criminal charges in Argentina, where he is alleged to have had an altercation with a neighbour in 2010. On 4 September, he was granted a work permit by the UK Border Agency to work in England. Ten days later he made his debut at Old Trafford as United won for the first time in the season, playing the entirety of the 4–0 victory over Queens Park Rangers. Rojo was stretchered off in United's 1–0 defeat in the Manchester derby on 2 November, sustaining shoulder damage from a tackle on Manchester City's Martín Demichelis. It was later confirmed that he had dislocated his shoulder, adding to United's defensive injuries alongside Jonny Evans and Phil Jones. On 3 February 2015, Rojo scored his first goal for United, heading a ball played by Robin van Persie for the second goal of a 3–0 win over Cambridge United in an FA Cup fourth round replay.

During Manchester United's 2015 pre-season tour of North America, Rojo was expected to join up with the rest of the squad following an extended break granted after competing for Argentina in the Copa América. However, passport issues reportedly caused Rojo to miss pre-season tour entirely, and the matter was said to have "angered" manager Louis van Gaal. Rojo was resultantly fined £140,000 for failing to join up with the rest of the squad on time. In the 2016 FA Cup Final, which United won 2–1 after extra time against Crystal Palace, Rojo was booked in the first half for fouling Pape Souaré and was substituted for Matteo Darmian after 66 minutes.

On 4 March 2017, Rojo scored his first Premier League goal to open a 1–1 home draw against Bournemouth. He suffered a season-ending cruciate ligament injury on 20 April, during a 2–1 win over Anderlecht in the quarter-finals of the Europa League, a tournament that United ended up winning. He made his return on 28 November 2017, in a 4–2 win at Watford.

On 16 March 2018, Rojo signed a new contract with Manchester United that would keep him at the club until June 2021, with the option to extend for a further year. In April 2019, after a run of injuries, Rojo said that United manager Ole Gunnar Solskjær had told him he was part of his plans when Solskjær was appointed on a temporary basis in December 2018. On 30 January 2020, Rojo was loaned to his boyhood club, Estudiantes, for the remainder of the 2019–20 season; he had started only 13 United games in the past two seasons.

=== Boca Juniors ===
On 2 February 2021, Rojo returned to Argentina once again to sign for Boca Juniors for an undisclosed fee. ESPN later reported that he heard about the transfer via social media. Rojo scored the opening goal in the 2022 Copa de la Liga Profesional final, a 3–0 win over Tigre on 11 May. On 12 October, he suffered a right-knee ligament injury similar to one he experienced with Manchester United in 2017; he was ruled out for seven to eight months. In 2023, after leading Boca through the knockout stages of Copa Libertadores, he missed the final after getting sent off during the semifinals against Palmeiras. They were beaten 2–1 in the final by Fluminense.

After some controversies in his last time with Boca Juniors (including a decision attributed to manager Miguel Ángel Russo to separate him from the senior squad), Rojo finally cancelled his contract with the club in August 2025.

=== Racing Club ===
On 10 August 2025, Rojo signed a one-year contract with Racing Club. He was assigned a shirt with the name "Marcos R.", as his surname is the Spanish word for red, the colour of Avellaneda derby rivals Independiente.

== International career ==
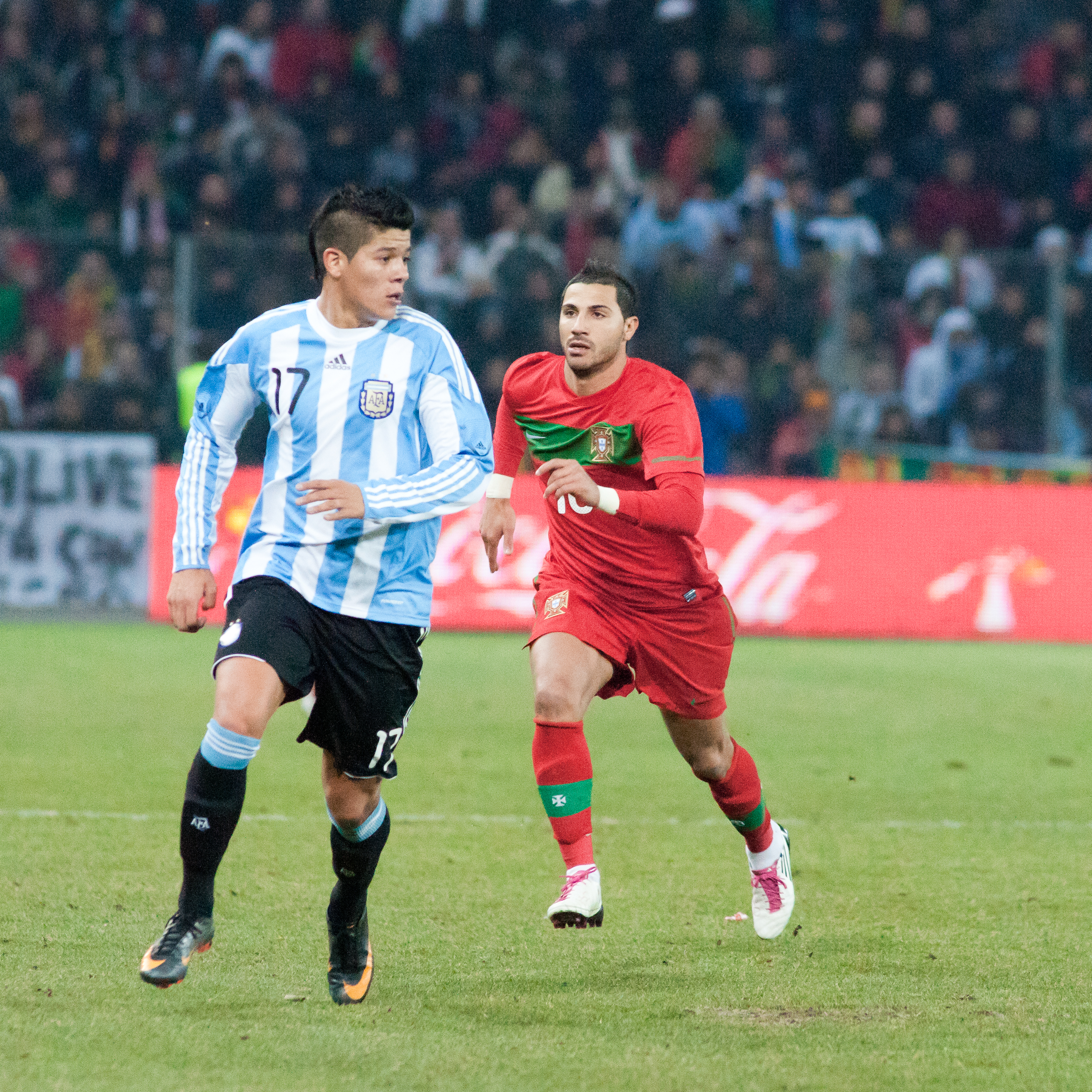
Rojo (left), pictured with Portugal's Ricardo Quaresma, in an international friendly in 2011

Rojo was first capped on 9 February 2011, in a 2–1 friendly victory against Portugal at the Stade de Genève, Geneva. Later that year he was included in Argentina's squad as they hosted the 2011 Copa América, and played the opening match on 2 July, a 1–1 draw against Bolivia. Javier Zanetti replaced him at left-back for the rest of the tournament as Argentina reached the quarter-finals.

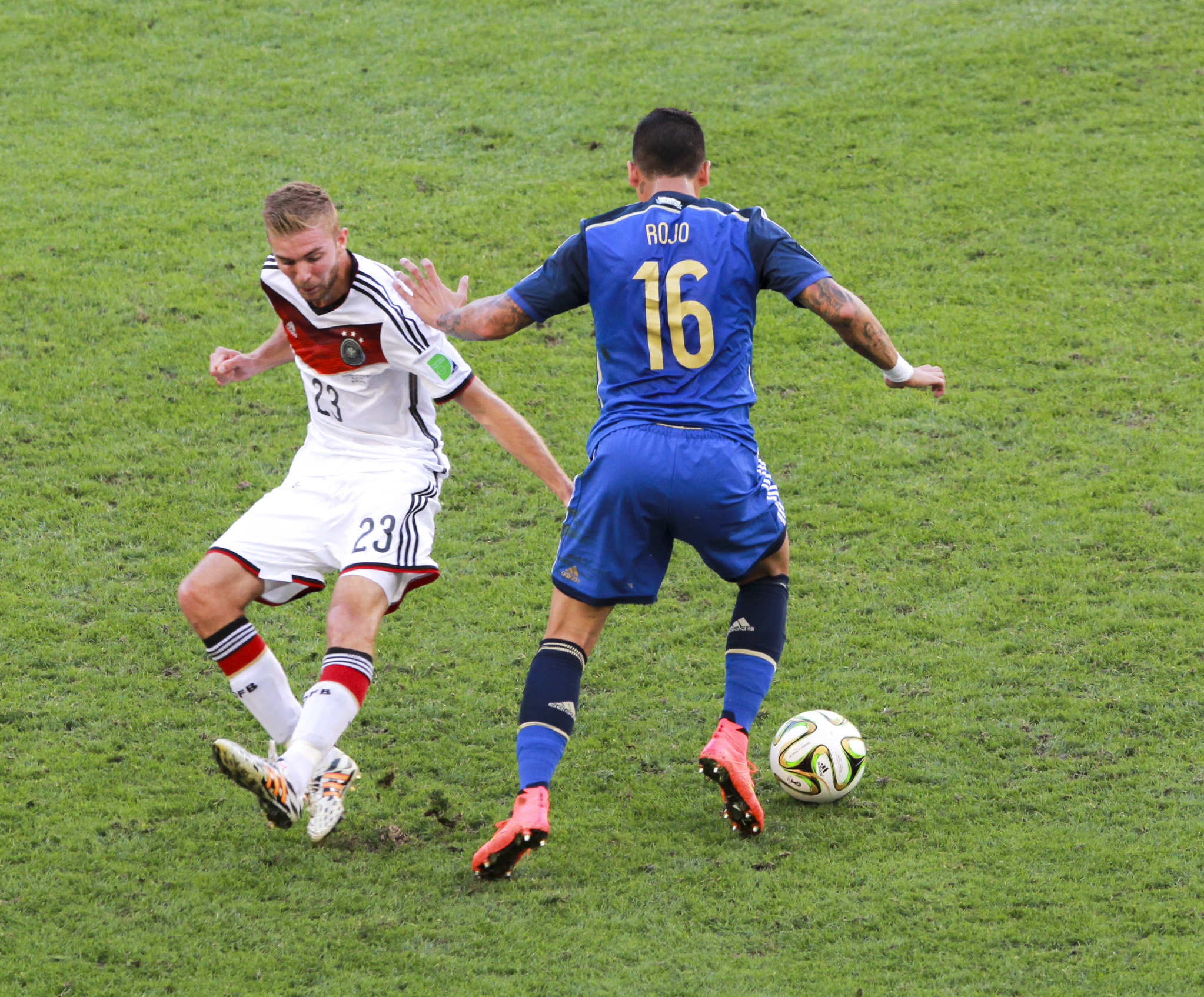
Rojo dribbling past Germany's Christoph Kramer in the 2014 FIFA World Cup Final

In June 2014, Rojo was named in Argentina's squad for the 2014 FIFA World Cup. He made his FIFA World Cup debut in their 2–1 victory over Bosnia and Herzegovina at the Maracanã, playing the full match in defence, and contributing to Sead Kolašinac's own goal. In the team's third group match, Rojo scored his first international goal, the winner in a 3–2 victory against Nigeria. The country reached the final before losing to Germany, and Rojo was the only Argentinean named in the Castrol Index Top 11 for the tournament.

Rojo was selected by coach Gerardo Martino for the 2015 Copa América. At the end of Argentina's goalless quarter-final against Colombia in Viña del Mar, Rojo missed in the penalty shootout but his team advanced nonetheless. On 30 June, he opened the scoring in a 6–1 semi-final defeat of Paraguay which put Argentina into the final. He played the entirety of the decisive match against the hosts at the Estadio Nacional de Chile, which Argentina lost on a penalty shootout after a goalless draw.

A year later for the Copa América Centenario in the United States, Rojo was again in Martino's squad. In the final on 26 June at MetLife Stadium, he was sent off in the first half for a foul on Arturo Vidal, as both teams ended the goalless game on 10 men and Chile again won on penalties.

Rojo was named by Jorge Sampaoli in the Argentina squad for the 2018 FIFA World Cup in Russia. On 26 June, he scored the winning goal, once again against Nigeria, which his Argentina won 2–1 and secured the team's qualification for the knockout stage as group runners-up behind Croatia. In the round of 16 match against France on 30 June, he was booked after conceding a penalty in the 10th minute for a foul on Kylian Mbappé, which was later converted by Antoine Griezmann, who opened the scoring. Rojo was later replaced by Federico Fazio in the 46th minute. Argentina lost the match 4–3 and were eliminated from the tournament.

== Style of play ==
According to football magazine Four Four Two, Rojo was more comfortable as a left-back rather than as a centre-back in his first season at Sporting, due to a number of positional errors and mistimed tackles; in his second season, his speed helped him in defence. They also attributed a good aerial threat to him, while noting that disciplinary problems remained.

In addition to his usual positions at centre-back and left-back, Rojo can play as a winger. On signing for Manchester United, it was theorised that he could feature as a wing-back in Louis van Gaal's preferred 3–5–2 formation.

== Personal life ==
Rojo is married to Eugenia Lusardo, a lingerie model based in Lisbon. They have three daughters.

Rojo has a number of tattoos, including the English words "Pride" and "Glory" on each thigh.

In December 2014, Rojo had an affair with a woman he had met at a night club. He accused her of blackmail and took out an injunction to stop newspapers publishing his name in the story. The injunction on his name was lifted in April 2015 due to concerns that other footballers could be suspected of the affair, but it remains in place to prevent the release of images of Rojo.

== Career statistics ==
=== Club ===
As of match played 8 November 2025

Appearances and goals by club, season and competition
| Club | Season | League | | | National cup (Note: Includes Copa Argentina, Russian Cup, Taça de Portugal, FA Cup) | | League cup (Note: Includes Taça da Liga, Football League/EFL Cup, Copa de la Liga Profesional) | | Continental | | Other | | Total | |
| Club | Season | Division | Apps | Goals | Apps | Goals | Apps | Goals | Apps | Goals | Apps | Goals | Apps | Goals |
|---|---|---|---|---|---|---|---|---|---|---|---|---|---|---|
| Estudiantes | 2008–09 | Argentine Primera División | 6 | 1 | 0 | 0 | — | | 1 (Note: Appearance(s) in Copa Libertadores) | 0 | — | | 7 | 1 |
| Estudiantes | 2009–10 | Argentine Primera División | 18 | 0 | 0 | 0 | — | | 6 (Note: Five appearances in Copa Libertadores, one appearance in Copa Sudamericana) | 0 | 1 (Note: Appearance in FIFA Club World Cup) | 0 | 25 | 0 |
| Estudiantes | 2010–11 | Argentine Primera División | 19 | 2 | 0 | 0 | — | | 0 | 0 | 2 (Note: Appearances in Recopa Sudamericana) | 1 | 21 | 3 |
| Estudiantes | Total | | 43 | 3 | 0 | 0 | — | | 7 | 0 | 3 | 1 | 53 | 4 |
| Spartak Moscow | 2010 | Russian Premier League | 0 | 0 | 2 | 1 | — | | 5 (Note: Appearance(s) in UEFA Europa League) | 0 | — | | 7 | 1 |
| Spartak Moscow | 2011–12 | Russian Premier League | 8 | 0 | 1 | 0 | — | | 1 | 0 | — | | 10 | 0 |
| Spartak Moscow | Total | | 8 | 0 | 3 | 1 | — | | 6 | 0 | — | | 17 | 1 |
| Sporting CP | 2012–13 | Primeira Liga | 24 | 1 | 0 | 0 | 2 | 0 | 7 | 0 | — | | 33 | 1 |
| Sporting CP | 2013–14 | Primeira Liga | 25 | 4 | 1 | 0 | 2 | 1 | — | | — | | 28 | 5 |
| Sporting CP | Total | | 49 | 5 | 1 | 0 | 4 | 1 | 7 | 0 | — | | 61 | 6 |
| Manchester United | 2014–15 | Premier League | 22 | 0 | 4 | 1 | 0 | 0 | — | | — | | 26 | 1 |
| Manchester United | 2015–16 | Premier League | 16 | 0 | 4 | 0 | 1 | 0 | 7 (Note: Four appearances in UEFA Champions League, three appearances in UEFA Europa League) | 0 | — | | 28 | 0 |
| Manchester United | 2016–17 | Premier League | 21 | 1 | 4 | 0 | 5 | 0 | 10 | 0 | 1 (Note: Appearance in FA Community Shield) | 0 | 41 | 1 |
| Manchester United | 2017–18 | Premier League | 9 | 0 | 1 | 0 | 1 | 0 | 1 (Note: Appearance in UEFA Champions League) | 0 | 0 | 0 | 12 | 0 |
| Manchester United | 2018–19 | Premier League | 5 | 0 | 0 | 0 | 0 | 0 | 1 | 0 | — | | 6 | 0 |
| Manchester United | 2019–20 | Premier League | 3 | 0 | 0 | 0 | 2 | 0 | 4 | 0 | — | | 9 | 0 |
| Manchester United | 2020–21 | Premier League | 0 | 0 | 0 | 0 | 0 | 0 | — | | — | | 0 | 0 |
| Manchester United | Total | | 76 | 1 | 13 | 1 | 9 | 0 | 23 | 0 | 1 | 0 | 122 | 2 |
| Estudiantes (loan) | 2019–20 | Argentine Primera División | 1 | 0 | 0 | 0 | 0 | 0 | — | | — | | 1 | 0 |
| Boca Juniors | 2020–21 | Argentine Primera División | 0 | 0 | 1 | 0 | 7 | 0 | 1 | 0 | — | | 9 | 0 |
| Boca Juniors | 2021 | Argentine Primera División | 16 | 1 | 3 | 0 | — | | 2 | 0 | — | | 21 | 1 |
| Boca Juniors | 2022 | Argentine Primera División | 26 | 5 | 0 | 0 | 15 | 2 | 3 | 0 | — | | 44 | 7 |
| Boca Juniors | 2023 | Argentine Primera División | 7 | 1 | 3 | 0 | 0 | 0 | 6 | 0 | — | | 16 | 1 |
| Boca Juniors | 2024 | Argentine Primera División | 22 | 0 | 4 | 0 | 0 | 0 | 4 (Note: Appearances in Copa Sudamericana) | 1 | — | | 30 | 1 |
| Boca Juniors | 2025 | Argentine Primera División | 12 | 1 | 0 | 0 | — | | 1 | 0 | 0 | 0 | 13 | 1 |
| Boca Juniors | Total | | 83 | 8 | 11 | 0 | 22 | 2 | 17 | 1 | — | | 133 | 11 |
| Racing Club | 2025 | Argentine Primera División | 3 | 0 | 1 | 0 | — | | 4 | 0 | — | | 8 | 0 |
| Career total | | | 248 | 15 | 29 | 2 | 35 | 3 | 64 | 1 | 4 | 1 | 380 | 22 |

=== International ===
As of match played 9 October 2019

Appearances and goals by national team and year
| National team | Year | Apps | Goals |
|---|---|---|---|
| Argentina | 2011 | 9 | 0 |
| Argentina | 2012 | 5 | 0 |
| Argentina | 2013 | 5 | 0 |
| Argentina | 2014 | 11 | 1 |
| Argentina | 2015 | 11 | 1 |
| Argentina | 2016 | 11 | 0 |
| Argentina | 2017 | 2 | 0 |
| Argentina | 2018 | 5 | 1 |
| Argentina | 2019 | 2 | 0 |
| Total | | 61 | 3 |

As of match played 9 October 2019. Argentina score listed first, score column indicates score after each Rojo goal.

International goals by date, venue, opponent, score, result and competition
| No. | Date | Venue | Opponent | Score | Result | Competition |
|---|---|---|---|---|---|---|
| 1 | 25 June 2014 | Estádio Beira-Rio, Porto Alegre, Brazil | Nigeria | 3–2 | 3–2 | 2014 FIFA World Cup |
| 2 | 30 June 2015 | Estadio Municipal de Concepción, Concepción, Chile | Paraguay | 1–0 | 6–1 | 2015 Copa América |
| 3 | 26 June 2018 | Krestovsky Stadium, Saint Petersburg, Russia | Nigeria | 2–1 | 2–1 | 2018 FIFA World Cup |

== Honours ==
Estudiantes

- Primera División: 2010 Apertura
- Copa Libertadores: 2009
- Supercopa Argentina: 2025

Manchester United

- FA Cup: 2015–16
- EFL Cup: 2016–17
- FA Community Shield: 2016
- UEFA Europa League: 2016–17

Boca Juniors

- Primera División: 2022
- Copa Argentina: 2019–20
- Copa de la Liga Profesional: 2022
- Copa Libertadores runner-up: 2023

Argentina

- FIFA World Cup runner-up: 2014
- Copa América runner-up: 2015, 2016

Individual

- FIFA World Cup Team of the Tournament: 2014
