= 2015 Copa América final =

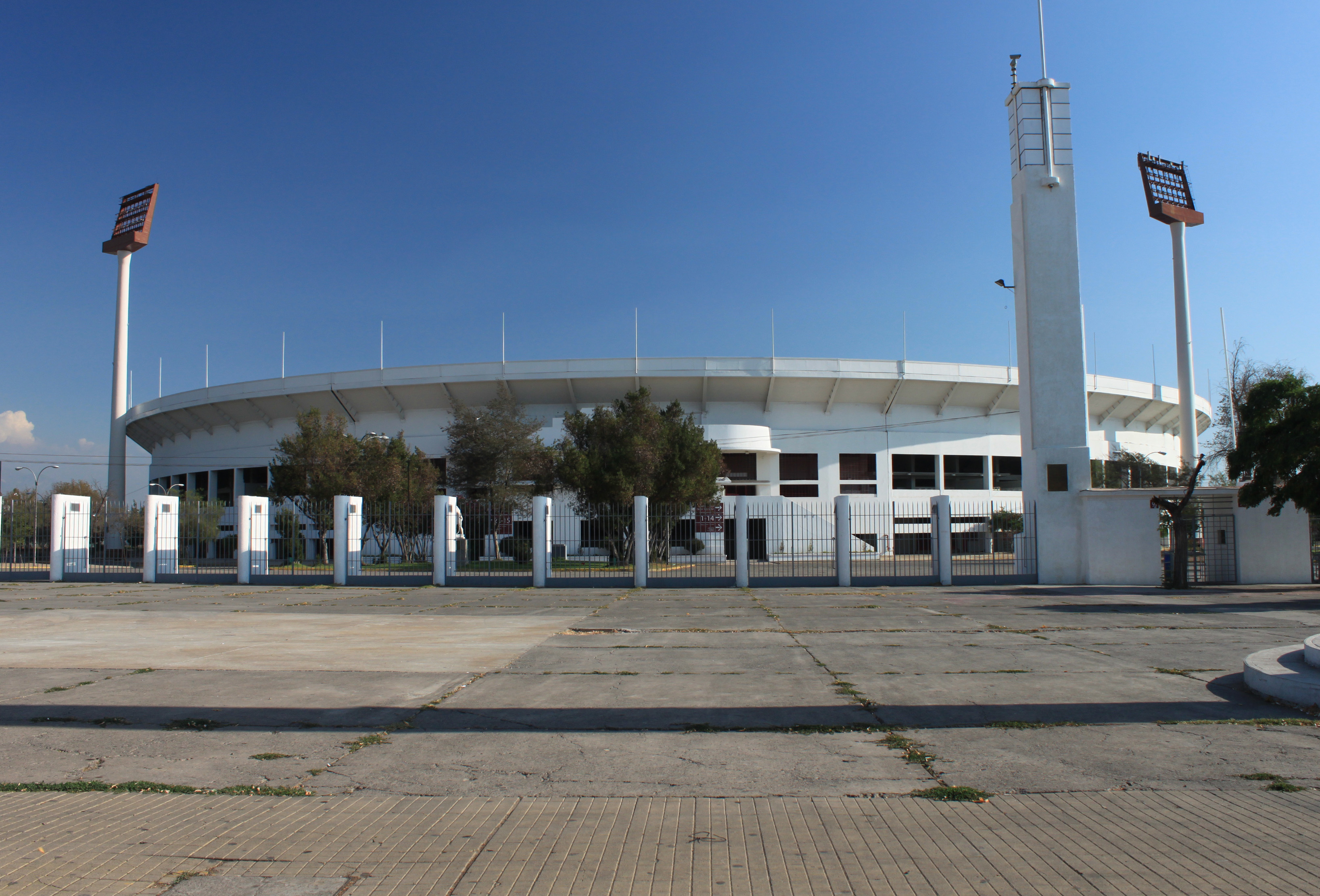
- Estadio Nacional in Santiago hosted the final
- Event: 2015 Copa América
Chile	Argentina
0	0
- After extra time Chile won 4–1 on penalties
- Date: 4 July 2015
- Venue: Estadio Nacional Julio Martínez Prádanos, Santiago
- Man of the Match: Arturo Vidal (Chile)
- Referee: Wilmar Roldán (Colombia)
- Attendance: 45,693
- Weather: 20 °C (68 °F), Clear

The 2015 Copa América final was the final match of the 2015 Copa América, an international football tournament organized by CONMEBOL that was played in Chile.

The match was held on 4 July 2015 in Santiago's Estadio Nacional, and contested by hosts Chile, and Argentina. Following a goalless draw, Chile defeated Argentina in a penalty shootout to win their first title and qualify for the 2017 FIFA Confederations Cup in Russia.

A new trophy was supposed to be created for the tournament and was to be unveiled on 4 July 2015 at the final. No trophy was unveiled amidst the FIFA corruption scandal.

== Background ==
This edition was the seventh hosted by Chile. The match marked the third time Chile had reached a final. They had never won the competition; their last finals appearance was in 1987, when they were defeated by Uruguay. Meanwhile, Argentina reached its fifth final in Chilean territory. Their previous finals appearance was in 2007, when they were defeated by Brazil, while their last championship (including worldwide tournaments) was won in 1993.

Including the editions from 1916 to 1967, when the Campeonato Sudamericano had a round-robin tournament format without a final match; it was the fifth appearance of Chile, and the twenty-seventh of Argentina, in the top two.

== Route to the final ==
Chile
Round
Argentina
Opponent
Result
Group stage
Opponent
Result
Ecuador
2–0
Match 1
Paraguay
2–2
Mexico
3–3
Match 2
Uruguay
1–0
Bolivia
5–0
Match 3
Jamaica
1–0

Team	Pld	W	D	L	GF	GA	GD	Pts
Chile	3	2	1	0	10	3	+7	7
Bolivia	3	1	1	1	3	7	−4	4
Ecuador	3	1	0	2	4	6	−2	3
Mexico	3	0	2	1	4	5	−1	2

Final standings

Team	Pld	W	D	L	GF	GA	GD	Pts
Argentina	3	2	1	0	4	2	+2	7
Paraguay	3	1	2	0	4	3	+1	5
Uruguay	3	1	1	1	2	2	0	4
Jamaica	3	0	0	3	0	3	−3	0

Opponent
Result
Knockout stage
Opponent
Result
Uruguay
1–0
Quarter-finals
Colombia
0–0 (5–4 pen.)
Peru
2–1
Semi-finals
Paraguay
6–1

== Match ==
=== Summary ===
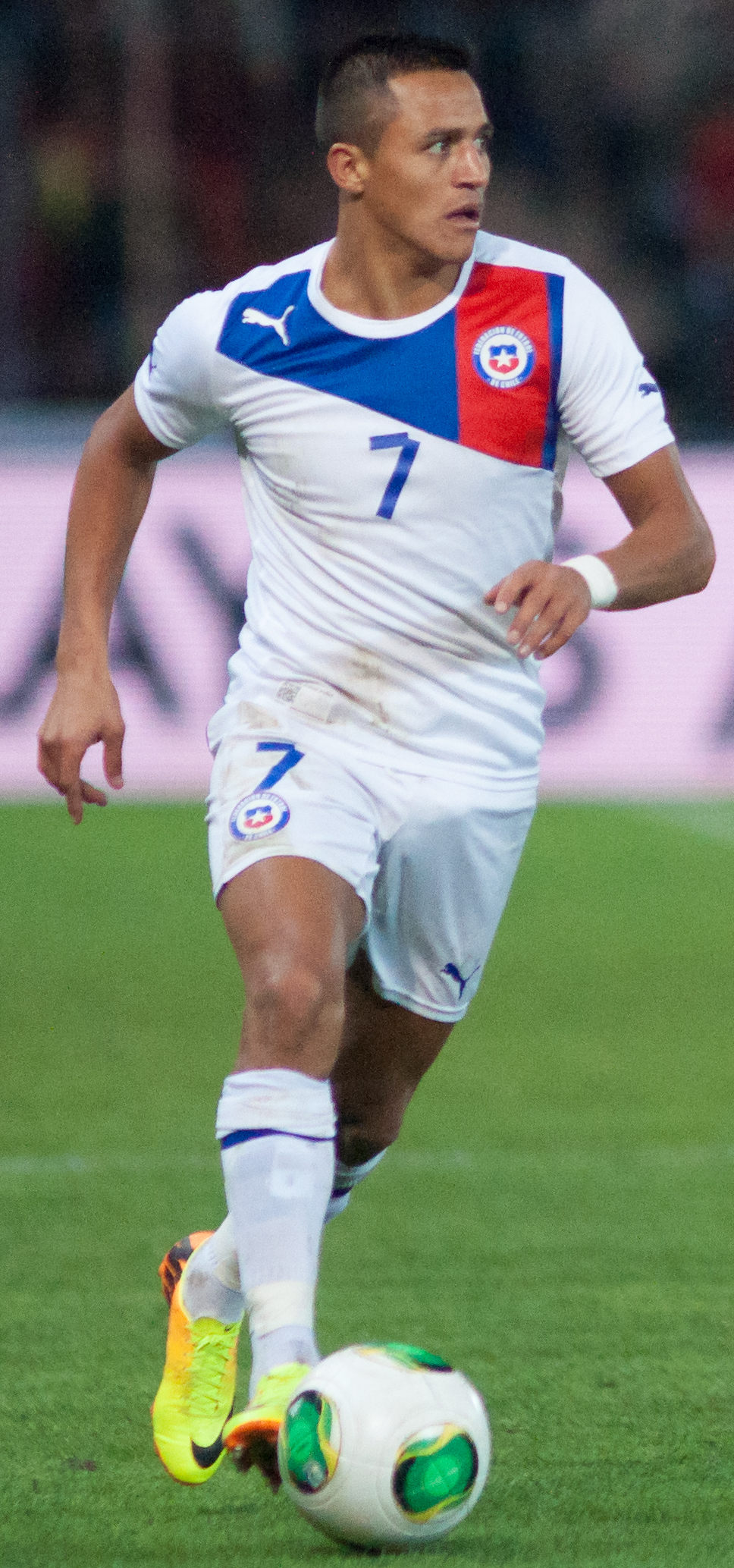
Alexis Sánchez scored the winner for Chile in the penalty shootout

Both sides had opportunities to open the scoring, and Chilean goalkeeper Claudio Bravo made a close-range save from Sergio Agüero, who had been set up by Lionel Messi. However, soon afterwards, Argentina made the first substitution due to a hamstring injury, with Ángel Di María making way for Ezequiel Lavezzi. Chile finished the first half with three yellow cards, while Argentina had none.

Chile began the second half with attacking momentum, and the first Argentine yellow card went to Javier Mascherano for deliberate handball. With 15 minutes remaining, both teams made substitutions, with Argentina switching their center-forward from Agüero to Gonzalo Higuaín, and Chile making an alteration in midfield, replacing Jorge Valdivia with Matías Fernández. Minutes later, Arturo Vidal went down in the penalty area, but no foul was called. With nine minutes remaining of regulation time, Argentina made their final substitution, Javier Pastore was replaced by Éver Banega; soon after his entrance into the game, Banega was fouled by Charles Aránguiz, who was booked. Argentina then had their best chance of the game with only seconds remaining in regular time. Argentina staged a counterattack after Chile lost the ball. Messi dribbled past two Chilean defenders before passing the ball to Lavezzi near the penalty area, Lavezzi then passed the ball to Higuaín, who charged down the right side with a tight angle to shoot. His shot was inches wide of the inside of the post, however, and instead the ball hit the outside of the net. After regulation time, the game remained goalless.

Early into extra time, Chile made their second substitution, replacing Eduardo Vargas with Ángelo Henríquez. In the final minutes of extra time, Chile had a corner, which was cleared by Lucas Biglia and Higuaín. During the second period of extra time, Chile had their best chance to take the lead, after a goal throw from Claudio Bravo failed to be properly cleared away by Mascherano, leaving Alexis Sánchez to run down the pitch and shoot, only for his shot to go over the crossbar. Later on, Messi was fouled, giving a free kick to Argentina, which Gary Medel cleared three times from the Chilean penalty area to take the game into a penalty shootout.

Matías Fernández took the first penalty, dispatching it past Argentine goalkeeper Sergio Romero, and Messi netted Argentina's first attempt to keep the scores level after the first round. Second was Vidal, who scored, despite Romero making contact with his shot. Higuaín then missed, with an attempt which went too high. Aránguiz scored from a powerful attempt and then Bravo saved Banega's shot. Alexis Sánchez scored the winning penalty, a Panenka-style finish.

=== Details ===
4 July 2015
17:00 CLT (UTC−3)

Chile	0–0 (a.e.t.)	Argentina
	Report
Penalties
Fernández (penalty scored); Vidal (penalty scored); Aránguiz (penalty scored); Sánchez (penalty scored)	4–1	(penalty scored) Messi; (penalty missed) Higuaín; (penalty missed) Banega

Estadio Nacional, Santiago
Attendance: 45,693
Referee: Wilmar Roldán (Colombia)

Chile	Argentina

GK	1	Claudio Bravo (c)
CB	5	Francisco Silva	(yellow card) 24'
CB	21	Marcelo Díaz	(yellow card) 34'
CB	17	Gary Medel	(yellow card) 44'
RM	4	Mauricio Isla
CM	20	Charles Aránguiz	(yellow card) 87'
CM	8	Arturo Vidal
LM	15	Jean Beausejour
AM	10	Jorge Valdivia		(substituted off) 75'
CF	11	Eduardo Vargas		(substituted off) 95'
CF	7	Alexis Sánchez
Substitutes:
MF	14	Matías Fernández		(substituted on) 75'
FW	22	Ángelo Henríquez		(substituted on) 95'
Manager:
(Argentina) Jorge Sampaoli

GK	1	Sergio Romero
RB	4	Pablo Zabaleta
CB	15	Martín Demichelis
CB	17	Nicolás Otamendi
LB	16	Marcos Rojo	(yellow card) 55'
CM	6	Lucas Biglia
CM	14	Javier Mascherano	(yellow card) 56'
RW	10	Lionel Messi (c)
AM	21	Javier Pastore		(substituted off) 81'
LW	7	Ángel Di María		(substituted off) 29'
CF	11	Sergio Agüero		(substituted off) 74'
Substitutes:
FW	22	Ezequiel Lavezzi		(substituted on) 29'
FW	9	Gonzalo Higuaín		(substituted on) 74'
MF	19	Éver Banega	(yellow card) 91'	(substituted on) 81'
Manager:
Gerardo Martino

Man of the Match:
Arturo Vidal (Chile)

Assistant referees:
Alexander Guzmán (Colombia)
Cristian De La Cruz (Colombia)
Fourth official:
José Argote (Venezuela)
Fifth official:
Christian Lescano (Ecuador)

=== Statistics ===
Overall
Statistic	Chile	Argentina
Goals scored	0	0
Total shots	16	6
Shots on target	9	4
Ball possession	52%	48%
Corner kicks	4	7
Fouls committed	29	21
Yellow cards	4	3
Red cards	0	0
