= 2015 Copa América Group C =

Group C of the 2015 Copa América was one of the three groups of competing nations in the 2015 Copa América. It consisted of Brazil, Colombia, Peru, and Venezuela. Group play began on 14 June 2015 and ended on 21 June 2015.

Brazil, Peru and Colombia advanced to the quarter-finals.

== Teams ==
Draw position	Team	Appearance	Previous best performance	FIFA Rankings	
Draw position	Team	Appearance	Previous best performance	October 2014 (Note: The rankings of October 2014 were used for seeding for the draw.)	Start of event
C1	Brazil	34th	Winners (1919, 1922, 1949, 1989, 1997, 1999, 2004, 2007)	6	5
C2	Colombia	20th	Winners (2001)	3	4
C3	Peru	30th	Winners (1939, 1975)	54	61
C4	Venezuela	16th	Fourth place (2011)	85	72

== Standings ==
Pos	Team	Pld	W	D	L	GF	GA	GD	Pts	Qualification
1	Brazil	3	2	0	1	4	3	+1	6	Advance to knockout stage
2	Peru	3	1	1	1	2	2	0	4	Advance to knockout stage
3	Colombia	3	1	1	1	1	1	0	4	Advance to knockout stage
4	Venezuela	3	1	0	2	2	3	−1	3	

Source: CONMEBOL
Rules for classification: Tie-breaking criteria

In the quarter-finals:

- Brazil advanced to play Paraguay (runners-up of Group B).
- Peru advanced to play Bolivia (runners-up of Group A).
- Colombia (as one of the two best third-placed teams) advanced to play Argentina (winners of Group B).

== Matches ==
All times local, CLT (UTC−3).

=== Colombia vs Venezuela ===
14 June 2015
16:00

Colombia	0–1	Venezuela
	Report	Rondón 59'

Estadio El Teniente, Rancagua
Attendance: 12,387
Referee: Andrés Cunha (Uruguay)

Colombia	Venezuela

GK	1	David Ospina
RB	18	Juan Camilo Zúñiga	(yellow card) 71'
CB	2	Cristián Zapata
CB	22	Jeison Murillo
LB	7	Pablo Armero		(substituted off) 82'
RM	11	Juan Cuadrado
CM	6	Carlos Sánchez	(yellow card) 54'	(substituted off) 63'
CM	5	Edwin Valencia
LM	10	James Rodríguez	(yellow card) 86'
CF	17	Carlos Bacca		(substituted off) 72'
CF	9	Radamel Falcao (c)
Substitutions:
MF	8	Edwin Cardona		(substituted in) 63'
FW	19	Teófilo Gutiérrez		(substituted in) 72'
FW	21	Jackson Martínez		(substituted in) 82'
Manager:
(Argentina) José Pékerman

GK	1	Alain Baroja
RB	16	Roberto Rosales
CB	4	Oswaldo Vizcarrondo	(yellow card) 83'
CB	3	Andrés Túñez
LB	5	Fernando Amorebieta	(yellow card) 25'
RM	8	Tomás Rincón
CM	13	Luis Manuel Seijas	(yellow card) 18'	(substituted off) 75'
LM	18	Juan Arango (c)		(substituted off) 85'
AM	15	Alejandro Guerra
AM	10	Ronald Vargas		(substituted off) 78'
CF	9	Salomón Rondón
Substitutions:
MF	14	Franklin Lucena	(yellow card) 74'	(substituted in) 75'
MF	11	César González		(substituted in) 78'
DF	6	Gabriel Cichero		(substituted in) 85'
Manager:
Noel Sanvicente

Man of the Match:
Salomón Rondón (Venezuela)

Assistant referees:
Mauricio Espinosa (Uruguay)
Carlos Pastorino (Uruguay)
Fourth official:
Enrique Cáceres (Paraguay)
Fifth official:
Carlos Cáceres (Paraguay)

=== Brazil vs Peru ===
14 June 2015
18:30

Brazil	2–1	Peru
Neymar 4'; Douglas Costa 90+1'	Report	Cueva 2'

Estadio Municipal Germán Becker, Temuco
Attendance: 16,342
Referee: Roberto García (Mexico)

Brazil	Peru

GK	1	Jefferson
RB	2	Dani Alves
CB	3	Miranda
CB	4	David Luiz
LB	6	Filipe Luís	(yellow card) 58'
CM	8	Elias
CM	5	Fernandinho
RM	19	Willian		(substituted off) 87'
AM	10	Neymar (c)	(yellow card) 45'
LM	17	Fred		(substituted off) 74'
CF	9	Diego Tardelli		(substituted off) 66'
Substitutions:
MF	7	Douglas Costa		(substituted in) 66'
MF	11	Roberto Firmino		(substituted in) 74'
MF	18	Éverton Ribeiro		(substituted in) 87'
Manager:
Dunga

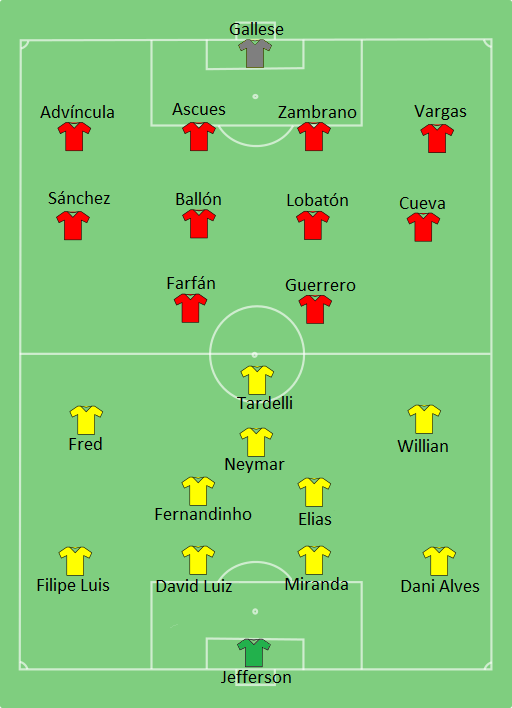

GK	1	Pedro Gallese
RB	17	Luis Advíncula
CB	22	Carlos Ascues
CB	5	Carlos Zambrano
LB	6	Juan Manuel Vargas	(yellow card) 83'	(substituted off) 89'
RM	20	Joel Sánchez
CM	21	Josepmir Ballón
CM	16	Carlos Lobatón (c)
LM	8	Christian Cueva		(substituted off) 82'
CF	10	Jefferson Farfán		(substituted off) 82'
CF	9	Paolo Guerrero	(yellow card) 30'
Substitutions:
FW	11	Yordy Reyna		(substituted in) 82'
FW	18	André Carrillo		(substituted in) 82'
DF	19	Yoshimar Yotún		(substituted in) 89'
Manager:
(Argentina) Ricardo Gareca

Man of the Match:
Neymar (Brazil)

Assistant referees:
José Luis Camargo (Mexico)
Marvin Torrentera (Mexico)
Fourth official:
Raúl Orosco (Bolivia)
Fifth official:
Juan P. Montaño (Bolivia)

=== Brazil vs Colombia ===
17 June 2015
21:00

Brazil	0–1	Colombia
	Report	Murillo 36'

Estadio Monumental David Arellano, Santiago
Attendance: 44,008
Referee: Enrique Osses (Chile)

Brazil	Colombia

GK	1	Jefferson
RB	2	Dani Alves
CB	3	Miranda
CB	14	Thiago Silva
LB	6	Filipe Luís
CM	8	Elias		(substituted off) 76'
CM	5	Fernandinho	(yellow card) 34'
RM	19	Willian		(substituted off) 69'
AM	10	Neymar (c)	(yellow card) 45'	(red card) 90+4'
LM	17	Fred		(substituted off) 46'
CF	11	Roberto Firmino	(yellow card) 41'
Substitutions:
MF	21	Philippe Coutinho		(substituted in) 46'
MF	7	Douglas Costa		(substituted in) 69'
FW	9	Diego Tardelli		(substituted in) 76'
Manager:
Dunga

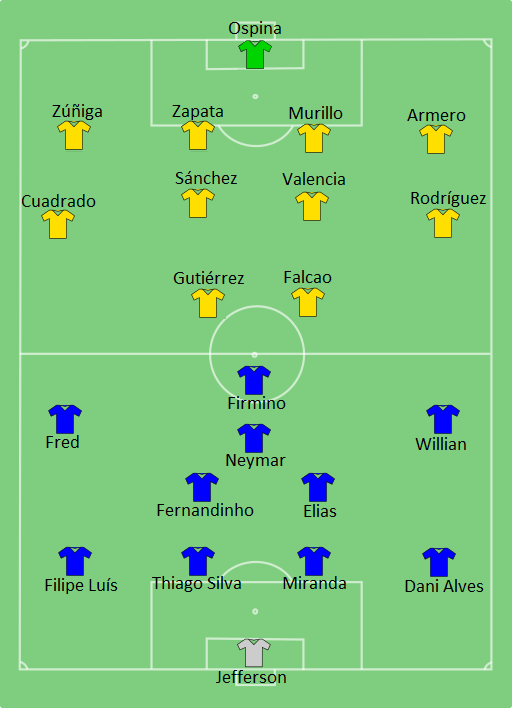

GK	1	David Ospina
RB	18	Juan Camilo Zúñiga
CB	2	Cristián Zapata
CB	22	Jeison Murillo
LB	7	Pablo Armero
RM	11	Juan Cuadrado
CM	6	Carlos Sánchez
CM	5	Edwin Valencia		(substituted off) 80'
LM	10	James Rodríguez
CF	19	Teófilo Gutiérrez	(yellow card) 19'	(substituted off) 76'
CF	9	Radamel Falcao (c)		(substituted off) 68'
Substitutions:
FW	16	Víctor Ibarbo		(substituted in) 68'
FW	17	Carlos Bacca	(red card) 90+4'	(substituted in) 76'
MF	15	Alexander Mejía		(substituted in) 80'
Manager:
(Argentina) José Pékerman

Man of the Match:
Carlos Sánchez (Colombia)

Assistant referees:
Carlos Astroza (Chile)
Marcelo Barraza (Chile)
Fourth official:
Néstor Pitana (Argentina)
Fifth official:
Hernán Maidana (Argentina)

=== Peru vs Venezuela ===
18 June 2015
20:30

Peru	1–0	Venezuela
Pizarro 71'	Report

Estadio Elías Figueroa, Valparaíso
Attendance: 15,542
Referee: Raúl Orosco (Bolivia)

Peru	Venezuela

GK	1	Pedro Gallese
RB	17	Luis Advíncula
CB	5	Carlos Zambrano
CB	22	Carlos Ascues
LB	6	Juan Manuel Vargas
RM	20	Joel Sánchez
CM	21	Josepmir Ballón	(yellow card) 35'
CM	16	Carlos Lobatón	(yellow card) 37'	(substituted off) 46'
LM	8	Christian Cueva		(substituted off) 83'
CF	14	Claudio Pizarro (c)	(yellow card) 69'	(substituted off) 89'
CF	9	Paolo Guerrero
Substitutions:
FW	11	Yordy Reyna		(substituted in) 46'
MF	7	Paolo Hurtado		(substituted in) 83'
DF	19	Yoshimar Yotún		(substituted in) 89'
Manager:
(Argentina) Ricardo Gareca

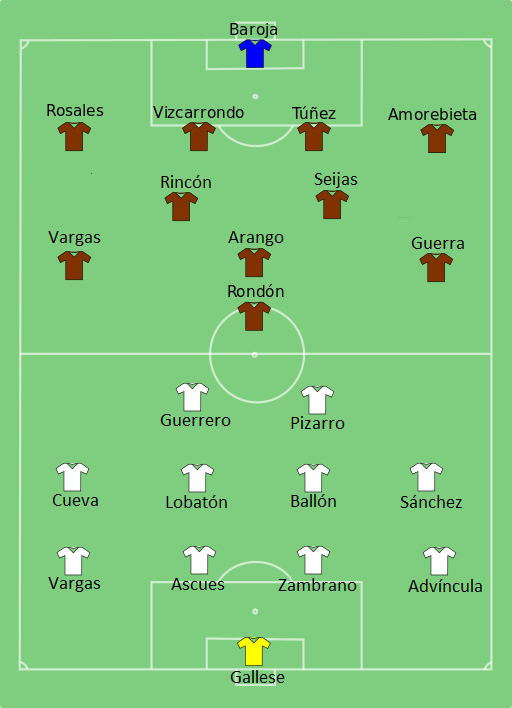

GK	1	Alain Baroja
RB	16	Roberto Rosales
CB	4	Oswaldo Vizcarrondo
CB	3	Andrés Túñez
LB	5	Fernando Amorebieta	(red card) 30'
CM	8	Tomás Rincón
CM	13	Luis Manuel Seijas		(substituted off) 82'
RM	10	Ronald Vargas		(substituted off) 37'
AM	18	Juan Arango (c)		(substituted off) 73'
LM	15	Alejandro Guerra
CF	9	Salomón Rondón
Substitutions:
DF	6	Gabriel Cichero	(yellow card) 88'	(substituted in) 37'
FW	17	Josef Martínez		(substituted in) 73'
FW	7	Miku		(substituted in) 82'
Manager:
Noel Sanvicente

Man of the Match:
Paolo Guerrero (Peru)

Assistant referees:
Javier Bustillos (Bolivia)
Juan P. Montaño (Bolivia)
Fourth official:
Roberto García (Mexico)
Fifth official:
José Luis Camargo (Mexico)

=== Colombia vs Peru ===
21 June 2015
16:00

Colombia	0–0	Peru
	Report

Estadio Municipal Germán Becker, Temuco
Attendance: 17,231
Referee: Néstor Pitana (Argentina)

Colombia	Peru

GK	1	David Ospina
RB	4	Santiago Arias
CB	2	Cristián Zapata	(yellow card) 8'
CB	22	Jeison Murillo
LB	7	Pablo Armero		(substituted off) 57'
RM	11	Juan Cuadrado
CM	5	Edwin Valencia		(substituted off) 24'
CM	6	Carlos Sánchez	(yellow card) 64'
LM	10	James Rodríguez
CF	9	Radamel Falcao (c)		(substituted off) 65'
CF	19	Teófilo Gutiérrez
Substitutions:
MF	15	Alexander Mejía		(substituted in) 24'
FW	16	Víctor Ibarbo		(substituted in) 57'
FW	21	Jackson Martínez		(substituted in) 65'
Manager:
(Argentina) José Pékerman

GK	1	Pedro Gallese
RB	17	Luis Advíncula
CB	5	Carlos Zambrano
CB	22	Carlos Ascues
LB	6	Juan Manuel Vargas
RM	20	Joel Sánchez		(substituted off) 81'
CM	21	Josepmir Ballón	(yellow card) 33'
CM	16	Carlos Lobatón	(yellow card) 79'
LM	8	Christian Cueva		(substituted off) 90'
CF	14	Claudio Pizarro (c)		(substituted off) 56'
CF	9	Paolo Guerrero
Substitutions:
FW	10	Jefferson Farfán	(yellow card) 90+1'	(substituted in) 56'
MF	7	Paolo Hurtado		(substituted in) 81'
DF	19	Yoshimar Yotún		(substituted in) 90'
Manager:
(Argentina) Ricardo Gareca

Man of the Match:
James Rodríguez (Colombia)

Assistant referees:
Hernán Maidana (Argentina)
Juan Pablo Belatti (Argentina)
Fourth official:
Carlos Vera (Ecuador)
Fifth official:
Christian Lescano (Ecuador)

=== Brazil vs Venezuela ===
21 June 2015
18:30

Brazil	2–1	Venezuela
Thiago Silva 8'; Firmino 51'	Report	Miku 84'

Estadio Monumental David Arellano, Santiago
Attendance: 33,284
Referee: Enrique Cáceres (Paraguay)

Brazil	Venezuela

GK	1	Jefferson
RB	2	Dani Alves
CB	14	Thiago Silva	(yellow card) 83'
CB	3	Miranda (c)
LB	6	Filipe Luís
RM	19	Willian
CM	5	Fernandinho
CM	8	Elias
LM	21	Philippe Coutinho		(substituted off) 67'
CF	11	Roberto Firmino		(substituted off) 67'
CF	20	Robinho		(substituted off) 76'
Substitutions:
DF	4	David Luiz		(substituted in) 67'
FW	9	Diego Tardelli		(substituted in) 67'
DF	13	Marquinhos		(substituted in) 76'
Manager:
Dunga

GK	1	Alain Baroja
RB	16	Roberto Rosales
CB	4	Oswaldo Vizcarrondo
CB	3	Andrés Túñez	(yellow card) 88'
LB	6	Gabriel Cichero
RM	13	Luis Manuel Seijas	(yellow card) 45+2'	(substituted off) 46'
CM	8	Tomás Rincón
LM	15	Alejandro Guerra		(substituted off) 72'
AM	10	Ronald Vargas	(yellow card) 45'	(substituted off) 46'
AM	18	Juan Arango (c)
CF	9	Salomón Rondón
Substitutions:
MF	11	César González		(substituted in) 46'
FW	17	Josef Martínez		(substituted in) 46'
FW	7	Miku		(substituted in) 72'
Manager:
Noel Sanvicente

Man of the Match:
Thiago Silva (Brazil)

Assistant referees:
Rodney Aquino (Paraguay)
Carlos Cáceres (Paraguay)
Fourth official:
Joel Aguilar (El Salvador)
Fifth official:
Garnet Page (Jamaica)
