= Estadio Municipal Germán Becker =

Stadium in Temuco, Chile

- Estadio Germán Becker
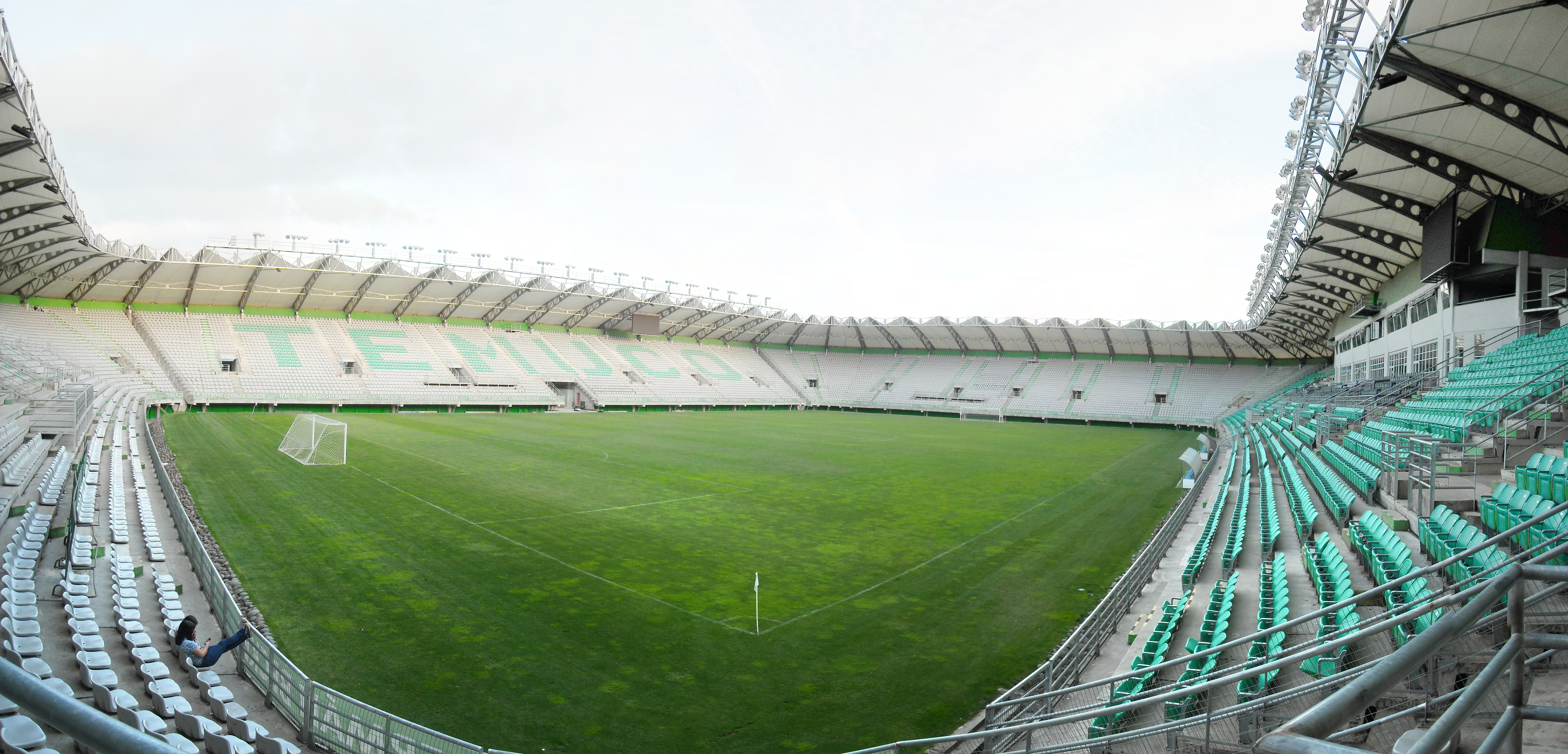
- Interior of the stadium
- Interactive map of Estadio Municipal Germán Becker
- Full name: Estadio Municipal Bicentenario German Becker Baechler
- Location: Temuco, Chile
- Coordinates: 38°44′34″S 72°37′11″W
- Owner: Municipality of Temuco
- Capacity: 18,100
- Surface: grass

Construction
- Groundbreaking: March 15, 1965
- Opened: August 13, 1965
- Reopened: November 5, 2008
- Cost: $ 16,866,360,960 ($ 34.4 million) -reconstruction-
- Architects: Sergio Ferreira P. Madrid Roberto L.
- Structural engineer: Eduardo Rodriguez
- General contractor: Socovesa

Tenant
- Deportes Temuco

The Estadio Municipal Bicentenario Germán Becker Baechler is a stadium located in Temuco, Chile and owned by the Temuco municipality. It is the home ground of Deportes Temuco and also, the former ground of the defunct Unión Temuco football clubs. It was designed by Enrique Esteve and inaugurated on August 13, 1965. Its dimensions are: 105 x 68 m. It has a capacity of 18,100. It was originally built for the inmates at the Temuco prison. The highest ever recorded attendance was on December 3, 1972, when 32,551 spectators saw the Primera Division match between Green Cross Temuco and Colo-Colo.

In 2007 the stadium was selected as a venue for the 2008 FIFA U-20 Women's World Cup, and to comply with FIFA standards, its facilities were improved, its capacity was decreased from 20,930 to 18,100; and all seats were covered by a roof (from about 80% previously). The athletics track was removed to enhance spectators' enjoyment of the on-the-pitch action. The stadium was re-inaugurated on November 5, 2008.

In 2013 the stadium was the main venue for the IRB Junior World Rugby Trophy.

On April 27, 2013, it hosted a 2015 Rugby World Cup qualifying match between hosts nation Chile and Brazil. Chile won 38 - 22 with 10,000 in attendance.

In 2015, three Copa América matches were played at the stadium.

== Gallery ==
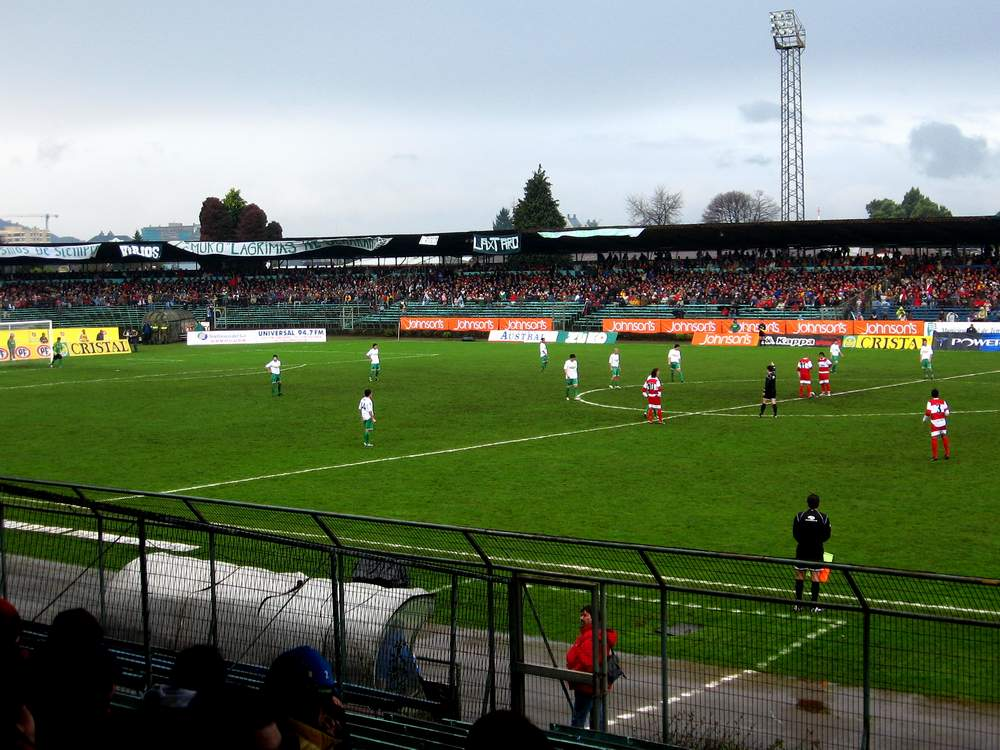
Stadium prior to renovation

== 2015 Copa América ==
Date	Time (UTC−3)	Team #1	Res.	Team #2	Round	Attendance
June 14, 2015	18:30	Brazil	2–1	Peru	Group C	16,342
June 21, 2015	16:00	Colombia	0–0	Peru	Group C	17,332
June 25, 2015	20:30	Bolivia	1–3	Peru	Quarter-Finals	16,872
