= Estadio Ester Roa =

Stadium in Concepción, Chile

- Collao
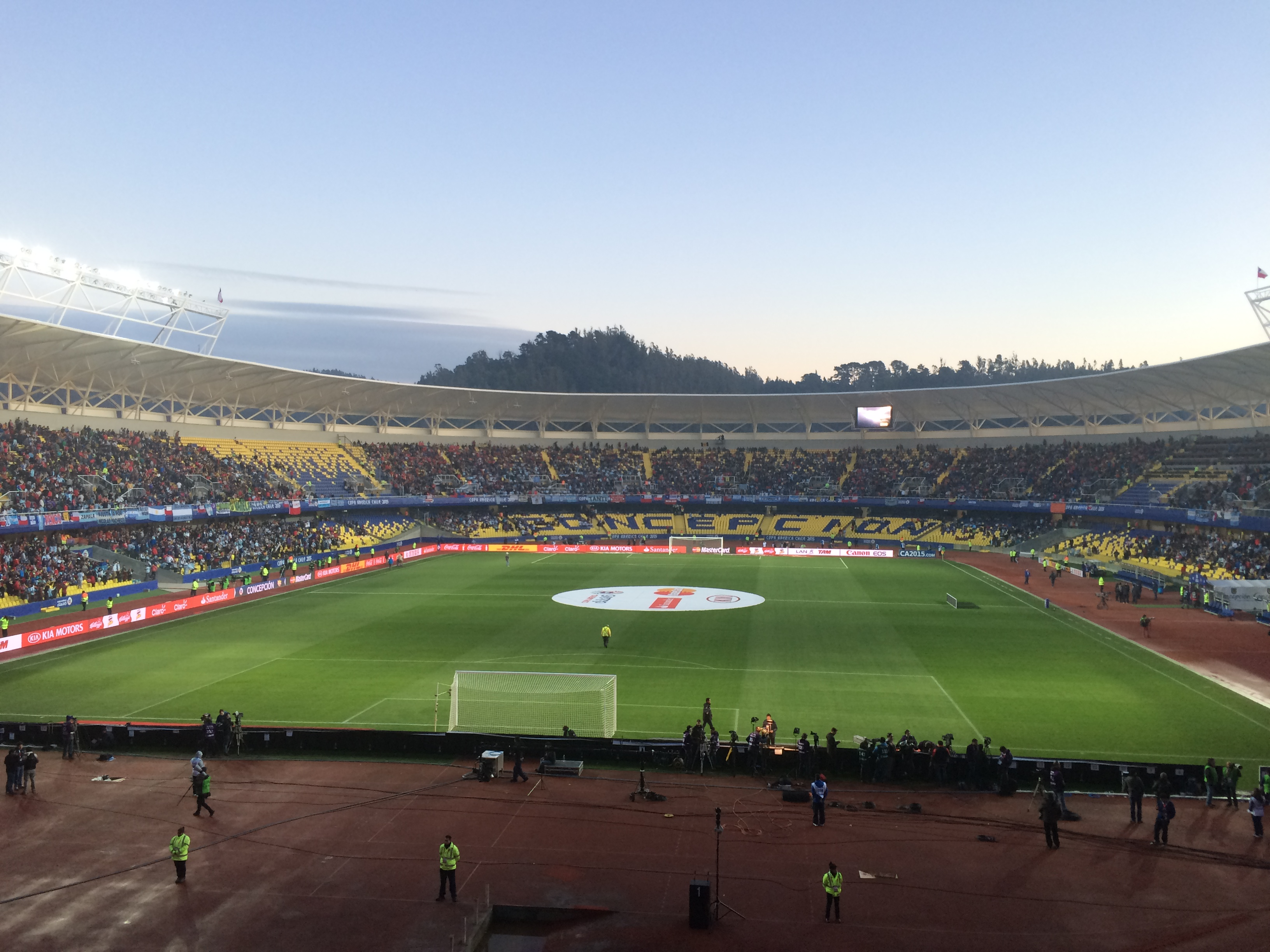
- Interactive map of Estadio Ester Roa
- Full name: Estadio Municipal Alcaldesa Ester Roa Rebolledo
- Location: Concepción, Chile
- Coordinates: 36°48′55″S 73°01′24″W
- Owner: Municipality of Concepción
- Capacity: 30,448
- Surface: grass
- Field size: 105 x 68 m

Construction
- Opened: September 16, 1962
- Renovated: 2013–2015
- Reopened: 25 June 2015
- Architect: Mario Recordón

Tenants
- Universidad de Concepción; Fernández Vial; Deportes Concepcion

Estadio Alcaldesa Ester Roa Rebolledo is a multi-purpose stadium in Concepción, Chile. It is used mostly for football matches. Constructed in 1962, it was originally named Estadio Regional with a capacity of 35,000. After a renovation in 2015, it now seats 30,448.

Previously known as Estadio Municipal de Concepción, it was renamed in honor of Ester Roa Rebolledo, a former mayor of Concepción.

The stadium was being renovated by Spanish company COPASA, but in May 2014, after continuing delays, the contract was terminated. In September 2014 the municipality of Concepción hired Chilean company Claro Vicuña Valenzuela to finish the works. The stadium was not completed in time to host two 2015 Copa América group stage matches, which were moved to Santiago's Estadio Monumental David Arellano. It was finally reopened on 25 June 2015, in time to host three Copa América matches.

The Ester Roa is currently the home stadium for Universidad de Concepción, Fernández Vial and Deportes Concepcion; Huachipato and Lota Schwager has also played some important home games at the stadium.

The highest ever recorded attendance was 43,340 on November 12, 1967 at the Primera Division match between Huachipato and Colo-Colo.

The stadium was also featured as a Copa América venue when the 1991 tournament was held in Chile.

In October 1987, the stadium was one of the venues for the FIFA U-20 World Cup.

In January 2004, it co-hosted the South American Pre-Olympic Tournament.

In October & November 2015, the stadium was one of the venues for the FIFA U-17 World Cup.

The stadium is also occasionally used for music concerts and athletics tournaments.

== 1991 Copa América ==
Date	Team #1	Res.	Team #2	Round	Attendance
July 8, 1991	Chile	4–2	Peru	First Round	18,798
July 12, 1991	Argentina	4–1	Paraguay	First Round	10,000

== 2015 Copa América ==
Date	Team #1	Res.	Team #2	Round	Attendance
June 27, 2015	Brazil	1–1 (Penalties: 3–4)	Paraguay	Quarter-Finals	29,276
June 30, 2015	Argentina	6–1	Paraguay	Semi-Finals	29,205
July 3, 2015	Peru	2–0	Paraguay	Third place match	29,143

== See also ==
- List of football stadiums in Chile
- Lists of stadiums
