= Vítor Silva (footballer, born 1984) =

Portuguese footballer

Vítor
Personal information
- Full name: Vítor Emanuel Cruz da Silva
- Date of birth: 7 January 1984 (age 42)
- Place of birth: Penafiel, Portugal
- Height: 1.69 m (5 ft 7 in)
- Position: Midfielder

Youth career
- 1992–1993: Paredes
- 1993–2003: Penafiel

Senior career*
Years	Team	Apps	(Gls)
2003–2004	Penafiel	1	(0)
2004–2005	Lousada	38	(0)
2005–2006	Paredes	23	(0)
2006–2011	Penafiel	89	(18)
2007–2008	→ União Madeira (loan)	36	(4)
2011–2013	Paços Ferreira	59	(7)
2013–2014	Sporting CP	8	(2)
2014	Sporting CP B	2	(0)
2014–2018	Reus	96	(10)
2019	Deportivo La Coruña	4	(0)
2019–2020	Feirense	17	(2)
2020–2021	Lusitânia	4	(0)
Total		377	(43)
- * Club domestic league appearances and goals

Vítor Emanuel Cruz da Silva (born 7 January 1984), known simply as Vítor, is a Portuguese former professional footballer who played as a central midfielder.

== Club career ==
Born in Penafiel, Vítor joined local F.C. Penafiel's youth system in 1993 at the age of nine. He alternated between the second and third divisions in his first eight years as a senior, also representing A.D. Lousada, U.S.C. Paredes and C.F. União.

Vítor reached the Primeira Liga in the 2011–12 season, signing for F.C. Paços de Ferreira. He made his debut in the competition on 14 August 2011, starting in a 2–1 away loss against Vitória de Setúbal.

Vítor contributed 29 games – 28 starts – and five goals in 2012–13, helping Paços to a best-ever third position with the subsequent qualification for the UEFA Champions League. Midway through the campaign, he was linked with a move to S.L. Benfica, with Jorge Mendes reportedly working to secure a transfer.

Also in 2013 but in the off-season, Vítor joined another Lisbon side, Sporting CP. On 26 August of the following year he signed with CF Reus Deportiu, moving to the Spaniards alongside teammate Rúben Semedo who arrived on loan.

On 31 August 2018, after Reus' registration problems meant that Vítor could not play for the club during the first half of the campaign, he terminated his contract. On 5 March 2019, following a period of trial, he signed with Deportivo de La Coruña also of the Spanish Segunda División.
